= Iglesia ni Cristo =

Filipino Christian new religious movement

- Seal of the Iglesia ni Cristo
- Abbreviation: INC
- Classification: Restorationism; Protestantism (Note: Iglesia Ni Cristo (INC) would not appear as a separate denomination until the 1948 Philippine census.)
- Scripture: Protestant Bible
- Theology: Apocalypticism; Yearly Holy Supper; Unitarianism; Nontrinitarianism; One true church
- Governance: Central administration
- Executive Minister: Eduardo V. Manalo
- Region: 72 sovereign nations (based on official INC Directory (Note: Official directory may not include creative access nations. According to their website, the INC is present in 166 countries and territories.))
- Language: Filipino, English
- Headquarters: Central Avenue, New Era, Quezon City, Philippines
- Founder: Felix Manalo (Note: According to Pasugo, the INC official publication, Jesus "established His church through the instrumentality of the Messenger who preached His words. We firmly believe that Brother Felix Y. Manalo was the one sent to fulfill this function—he is God's Messenger in these last days." Therefore, INC doctrine itself affirms that Jesus Christ could have not physically, spiritually, nor historically established the church in the Philippines. In the same way, He could have not registered it with the Philippine government in 1914, nearly two thousand years after His death and resurrection. Pasugo cited Matthew 16:18 as the Biblical basis for the INC's direct connection with the first century Christians, but the verse itself does not mention any other person besides Jesus Himself establishing the church, in His time nor in the future, and certainly without explicit mention of a Felix Y. Manalo in the text. The INC itself admits that Felix Manalo's name is nowhere to be found in the Bible.)
- Origin: July 13, 1914; 112 years ago (date registered to the Philippine government as Iglesia ni Kristo or INK) (Note: Based on the Articles of Incorporation, the registration date is 13 July 1914, as Iglesia ni Kristo or INK, while the Amended Articles of Incorporation filed in 1948 indicated the registration date is 27 June 1914 (as Iglesia ni Cristo or INC). The Amended Articles of Incorporation filed in 1973 already indicated the registration date of the church as 27 July 1914. The last mentioned date is carried over by the SEC in its website. This date of registration (27 July) is currently commemorated by the church as its anniversary date.); December 25, 1913; 112 years ago (date of baptism of first INC members); Punta, Santa Ana, Manila, Philippine Islands
- Absorbed: Iglesia Ni Cristo 1901 (Note: The official name of the Christian Mission established in the Philippines in 1901 is Iglesia Ni Cristo. To distinguish this from the INC founded by Felix Manalo in 1914, the year of establishment was added. Manalo registered the church in 1914 as Iglesia ni Kristo or INK.) (Ugong, Pasig congregation only, 1918); Iglesia Universal de Cristo (Cebu City congregation only, 1937)
- Separations: Iglesia Verdadera de Cristo Jesus (1922, later renamed as The Most Holy Church of God in Christ Jesus); Iglesia ng Dios kay Cristo Jesus (1928, later renamed as Iglesia ng Dios kay Cristo Jesus, Haligi at Suhay ng Katotohanan); INC Defenders (2015); True Church of Christ (2015, also known as Small Remnant); Church of Yahusha 1914 Ministries (2020); Assembly of Yahusha (2021)
- Congregations: 178 ecclesiastical districts ▼5,772 congregations (as of 2026, from 5,968 in 2025) ▼2,421 house churches, group worship services, and church extensions (as of 2026, from 2,715 in 2025)
- Members: 2.8 million (2020; Philippines only (Note: As per the 2020 Philippine census.)); 3 million worldwide (estimated) up to 3.2 million (as of 2026)
- Ministers: ▲5,504 (ordained as of 2026, from 5,252 in 2025)
- Aid organization: Felix Y. Manalo Foundation; UNLAD International
- Hospitals: New Era General Hospital
- Primary schools: Yakap Orphanage
- Tertiary institutions: New Era University; Iglesia ni Cristo (Church of Christ) School for Ministers
- Other name: Church of Christ
- Official website: iglesianicristo.net
- Slogan: Trusted. Connected. On point.

The Iglesia ni Cristo (INC; stylized as Iglesia Ni Cristo; Tagalog pronunciation: [ʔɪɡˌlɛs.jɐ n̪ɪ ˈkɾis.t̪o]; transl. Church of Christ) is a Christian new religious movement founded in 1913, and registered by Felix Manalo in 1914 as a sole religious corporation with the Insular Government of the Philippines.

Seen as a rigid, authoritarian, exclusivist, highly centralized, and apocalyptic church, the INC describes itself to be the one true church and the restoration of the original church founded by Jesus, whereby all other Christian churches are apostatic. According to INC doctrine, the official registration of the church with the Philippine government was on 13 July 1914, by Felix Manalo—who is upheld by members to be the last messenger of God in the End Times (Note: According to INC doctrine, God's four messengers in the church era are Jesus Christ, Paul the Apostle, Martin Luther, and Felix Manalo.)—was an act of divine providence and the fulfillment of biblical prophecy concerning the re-establishment of the original church of Jesus in the Far East (Note: According to the official INC publication Pasugo, there is no explicit mention in the Bible of the Philippines being the "Far East" or Malayong Silangan in the book of Isaiah. It also admits that the term "Philippines" is nowhere cited in the Bible. Rather, the term "Far East" includes the nations of Asia, a region which the Philippines is part of.) concurrent with the coming of the seventh seal marking the end of days.

By the time of Manalo's death in 1963, the INC had become a nationwide organization with 1,250 local chapels and 35 cathedrals. As his successor, Manalo's son, Eraño Manalo, led a campaign to grow and internationalize the church until his death on 31 August 2009. His son, Eduardo V. Manalo, succeeded him as Executive Minister. The 2020 Philippine census reported that 2.8 million were adherents of the INC, making it the fifth (5th) largest denomination in the Philippines behind the Roman Catholic Church, Islam, Evangelicalism, and Protestantism. (Note: Member churches of the Philippine Council of Evangelical Churches (PCEC) have a total of 2,469,957 members according to the 2010 Philippine census, making Evangelical Christianity as the third largest denomination in the Philippines. Evangelical population is also larger than that of the INC (which reportedly had 2,251,941 adherents in 2010). However, the total count was not reflected as member churches were treated separately in the 2020 Philippine census. The total number of adherents for Evangelical and PCEC member churches listed in the 2020 Philippine census would be 5,246,914 or 4.8 percent of the Filipino population. Adherents of member churches of the National Council of Churches in the Philippines (NCCP), meanwhile, total to 2,995,642 for the 2020 Philippine census, or 2.8 percent. This makes the NCCP-aligned Protestants as the fourth largest denomination in the Philippines after the Evangelicals, and the INC as the fifth largest.)

== History ==
During the American colonial era of the Philippines, there were a variety of rural anti-colonial movements, often with religious undertones, and American Protestant missionaries introduced several alternatives to the Catholic Church, the predominant church during the Spanish colonial period.

=== Felix Manalo ===
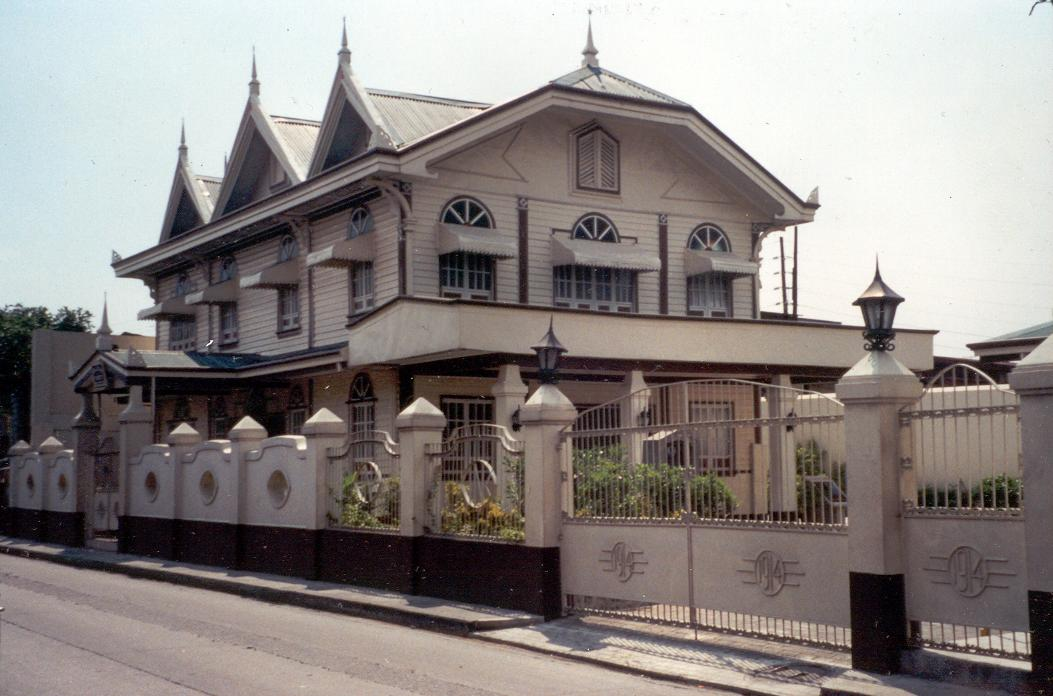
Built in 1937, the former chapel of the congregation of Punta in Santa Ana, Manila is now an INC museum. Notable is the fence design featuring the letters "INK", the abbreviation of the church's original registered name Iglesia ni Kristo.

Felix Manalo, born on 10 May 1886, as Felix Ysagun to Mariano Ysagun y Villanueva and Bonifacia Manalo y Cruz in Taguig, Philippines, was baptized into the Catholic Church. Manalo's baptismal record, however, cannot be found, as records of his parish date back only to June 1886. Manalo became dissatisfied with Catholic theology in his teenage years. At the age of seven, Manalo was said to have attended classes under a certain "Maestro Cario" in Manila. However, his studies were interrupted by the Philippine Revolution in 1896, prompting him not to pursue further formal education, and turn to farming and hatmaking instead. According to the National Historical Commission of the Philippines, the establishment of the Philippine Independent Church (also called the Aglipayan Church), one of the enduring results of the Revolution, was his major turning point. Still, Manalo remained uninterested since its doctrines were mainly Catholic, although at the time he found himself aligned with colorumism, a syncretism of Christian and animist beliefs popular among Filipinos. In 1904, he joined the Methodist Episcopal Church, entered the Methodist Florence Nicholson Seminary, and became a lay preacher for the Methodist Mission. (Note: Some sources indicate that Manalo was a Methodist pastor, but official Methodist sources do not mention the ordination of Manalo. The first Filipino to be ordained as a minister by the Methodist Mission was Bishop Nicolas Zamora in 1900.) He also explored various Christian denominations, including the Presbyterian Church (where he studied in the Ellinwood Bible School), Iglesia ni Cristo 1901 (Christian Mission), and finally the Seventh-day Adventist Church in 1911, where he served as a lay preacher. (Note: Some sources indicate that Manalo was an Adventist pastor, but official Adventist sources say that the first Filipino ministers were ordained by the church by 1919, excluding the disfellowshipped Manalo.) After being antagonized by fellow Adventists for his colorum past, and being reprimanded for his elopement with his future wife (they were married in a different church), Manalo left Adventism in 1913, and associated himself with atheist and agnostic peers.

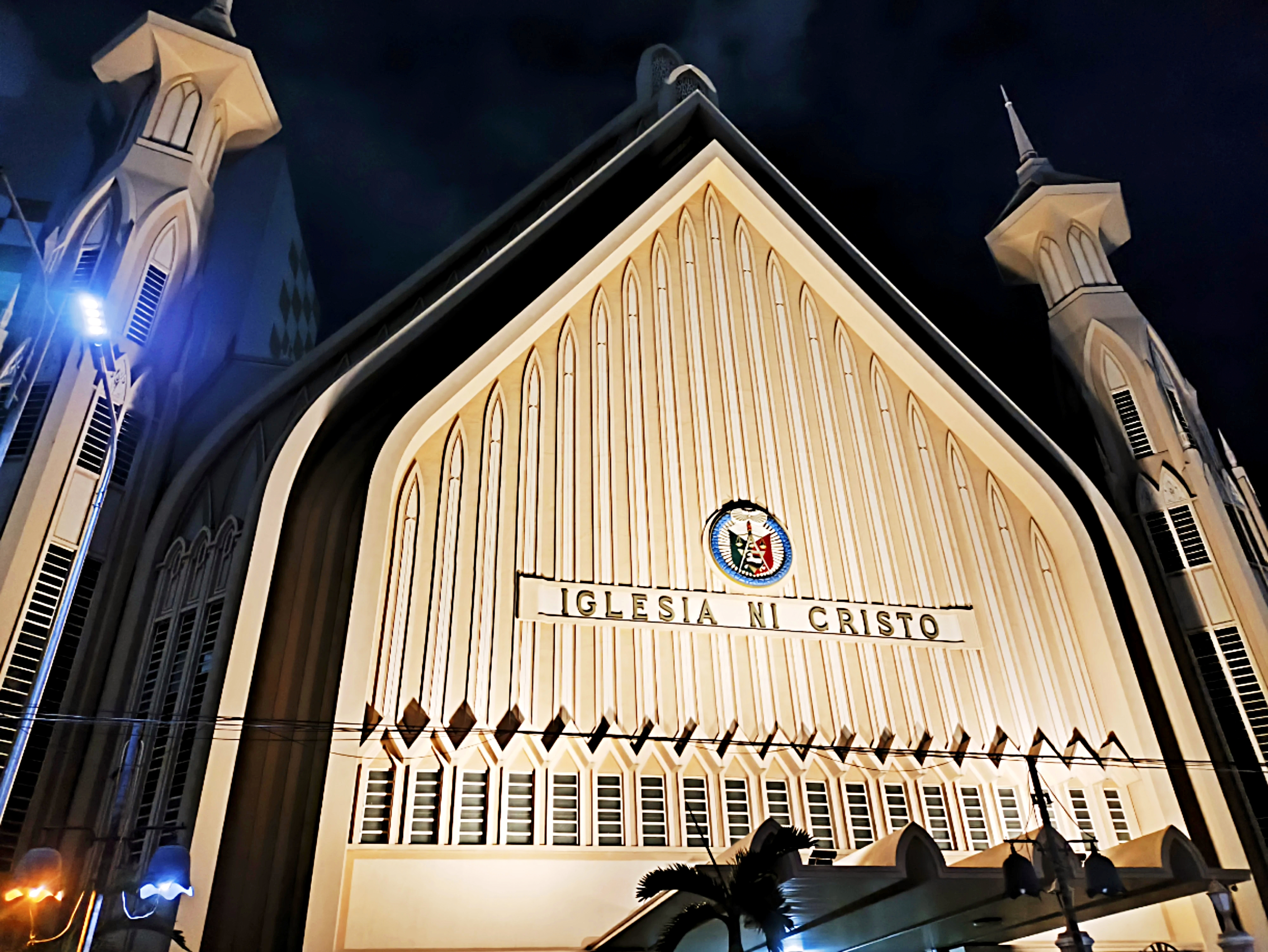
The INC Lokal ng Tondo, established on 6 November 1915, is one of the earliest congregations of the church. The current structure was completed in 1967.

In November 1913, Manalo secluded himself with religious literature and unused notebooks in a friend's house in Pasay, instructing everyone in the home not to disturb him. He emerged from seclusion three days later with his newfound doctrines. Manalo, together with his wife, went to Punta, Santa Ana, Manila, in November 1913 and started preaching. He also returned to his hometown Taguig to evangelize, where he was ridiculed and stoned at his evangelistic meetings with locals. He later baptized a few converts, including some of his persecutors, along the Pasig River on 25 December 1913. They formed the first members of the church. He eventually attracted more followers. Among those he invited to become ministers of his new church would be Bishop Nicolas Zamora of IEMELIF, who was then leading an 11,000-member Methodist church (Zamora refused the offer). (Note: According to the INC, Manalo was one of the members of Zamora's congregation when the former joined the Methodists in 1904. The extent of the relationship between Manalo and Zamora, however, was not fully explored by both INC and Methodist sources. Zamora died on 14 September 1914, two months after Manalo registered the Iglesia ni Kristo.) Prompted by concerns that his evangelism and propagation efforts for the new church might be illegal, Manalo later registered his new church as the Iglesia ni Kristo (INK; lit. 'Church of Christ'; Spanish: Iglesia de Cristo) on 13 July 1914, at the Bureau of Commerce as a corporation sole, with himself as the first executive minister, Pedro Inocencio as bishop, Tomas de la Cruz as evangelist, and Serapio Dionisio as deacon. Expansion followed as INC started building congregations in the provinces in 1916, with Pasig (then in Rizal Province) having two locales established. On 25 December 1918, coinciding with the fifth (5th) anniversary celebration of the church, Manalo was ordained as a minister by the following bishops and pastors: Alejandro Reyes (IEMELIF), Victoriano Mariano (IEMELIF), Gil Domingo (Iglesia de los Cristianos Filipinos), Guillermo Zarco (Presbyterian Church), Emiliano Quijano (Iglesia ni Cristo 1901) (Note: Besides delivering thanksgiving sermon for this occasion, Quijano was also known as the minister who officiated Manalo's wedding. The official name of the Christian Mission established in the Philippines in 1901 is Iglesia Ni Cristo. To distinguish this from the INC founded by Felix Manalo in 1914, the year of establishment was added. Manalo registered the church in 1914 as Iglesia ni Kristo or INK.), Nicolas Fajardo (Evangelical Church), Roque Bautista (Evangelical Church). The first three ministers of the INC were ordained thereafter, in May 1919, namely Justino Casanova (pangulo ng lupon), Federico Inocencio (kagawad ng lupon), and Teodoro Santiago (kalihim ng lupon). Before leaving for the United States in August 1919, he visited the INC congregations and left the newly-ordained ministers in charge of the church until his return to the Philippines in 1921. Manalo went twice to the United States to study religion in Protestant-managed schools, first in 1919, and later in 1938. (Note: According to the INC, Manalo studied at the Protestant seminary Pacific School of Religion (PSR), affiliated with the United Church of Christ, from 1919 to 1921. Manalo himself attested he had once a conflict with a Japanese schoolmate there. However, school records indicate that Manalo was never a student of the PSR.) Early church members were said to be mostly uneducated, illiterate, and coming from the lower socioeconomic classes, the ministers included.

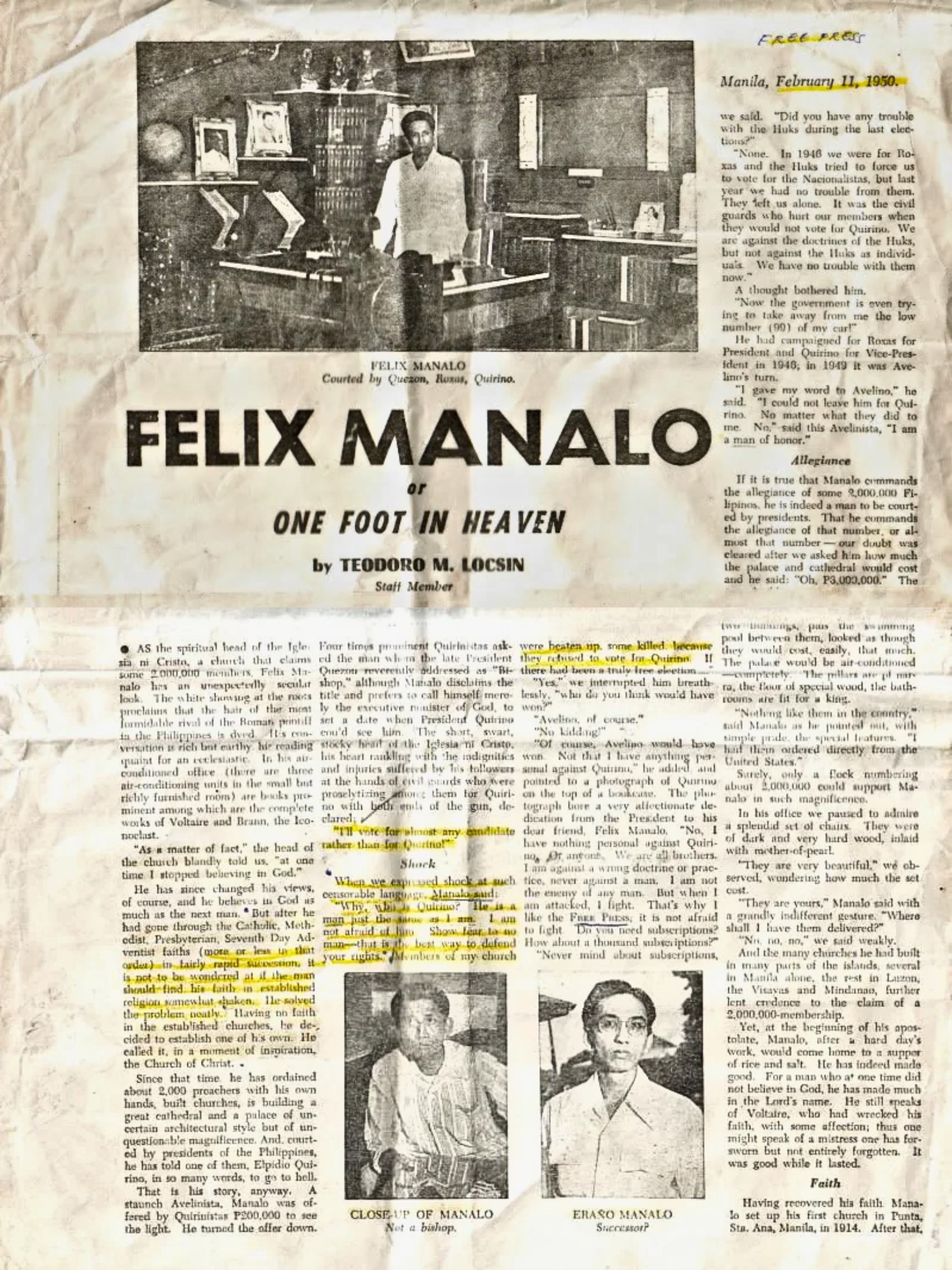
Philippines Free Press feature of the interview of Felix Manalo by Teodoro Locsin, Sr. (11 February 1950), where Manalo claimed that the INC has 2 million members. In the said interview, Manalo also explained his support for Senator Jose Avelino, who lost his bid for the 1949 Philippine presidential election. Framed photographs of Avelino and President Manuel L. Quezon were visible in Manalo's office.

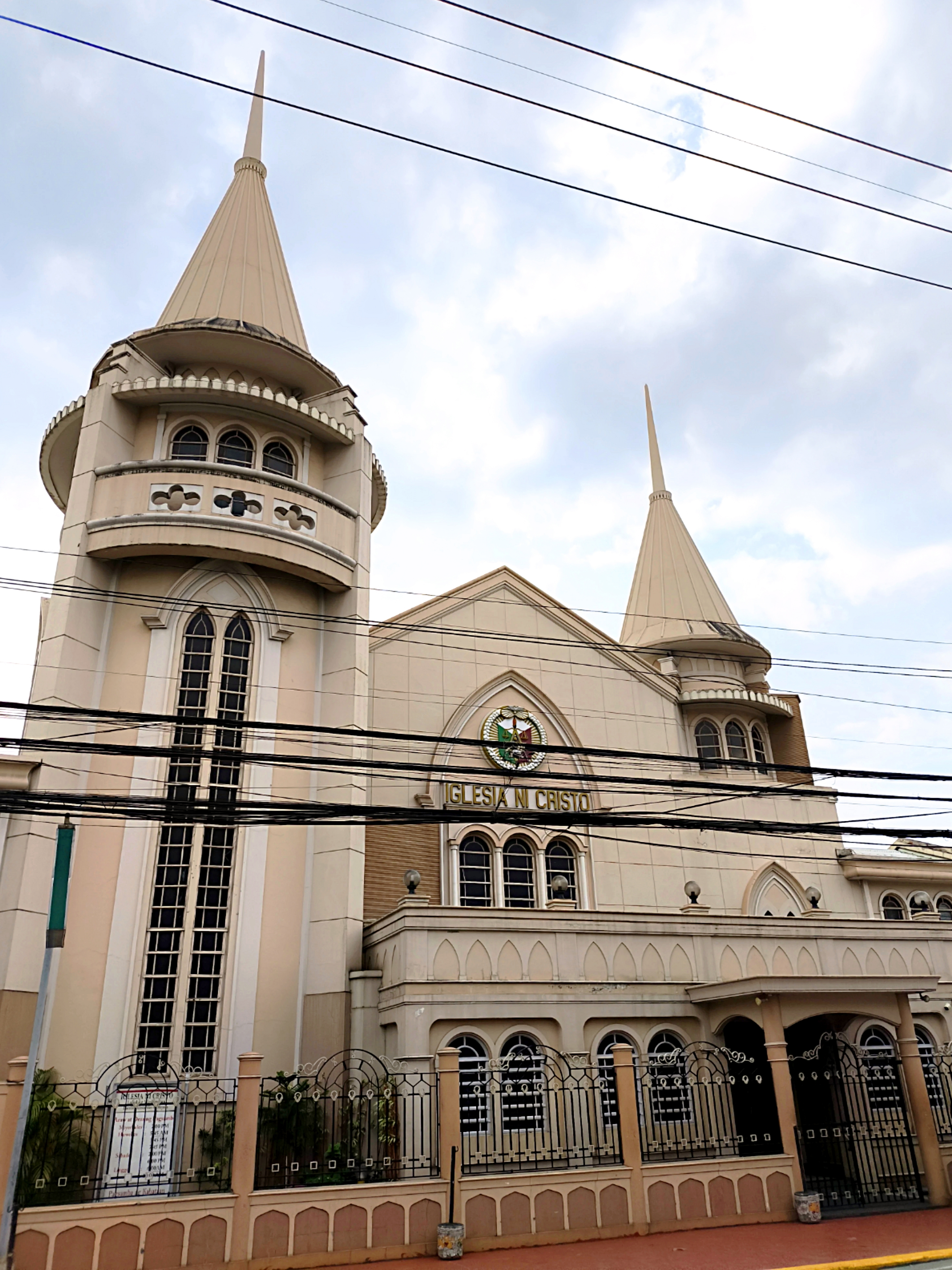
The INC Lokal ng Washington (Sampaloc, Manila) is the first concrete chapel of the Iglesia ni Cristo. It was completed in 1948. The first members of this congregation mainly came from the INC Lokal ng Tayuman.

In response to the separation of congregations led by INC ministers Teofilo Ora, Januario Ponce, and Basilio Santiago, which severely divided the emerging church primarily in the provinces such as Bulacan and Nueva Ecija, Manalo's title as the Sugo (transl. Messenger) was introduced to church doctrine in 1922, after interpreting that Manalo is the "angel from the East" mentioned in Revelation 7:2. Ora and the ministers who went with him clashed with Manalo in terms of doctrine, such as the decreasing relevance of Jesus Christ in the INC preaching (paksa), and how the church was run, particularly in light of reported abuses and immorality. Other changes by this time included the eventual rejection of cassock (sutana) as clothing for ministers. Manalo's authority over the church was so pervasive that outsiders termed the church as the Iglesia ni Manalo (transl. Church of Manalo) and its adherents "Manalistas" for their "fanatical" obedience to the church administration. By 1924, INC had about 3,000 to 5,000 adherents in 43 or 45 congregations in Manila and six nearby provinces. Church growth, however, came with more troubles. In 1928, INC Minister Nicolas Perez of Bulacan led another significant split across church ranks. Perez protested against abuses of the church, the changing doctrine on vices and jewelry, and the controlling nature of the church administration that discourages open-mindedness and critical thinking among its members. (Note: During Manalo's early ministry, wearing of jewelry, and engagement in vices such as smoking and drinking alcohol were banned. Drinking soft drinks were also prohibited by Manalo. Later on, as the INC began to attract more affluent members, and enforcing abstinence on new converts proved more difficult, church doctrine softened on these prohibitions. Manalo and the ministers who agree with him defended the change in doctrine by saying that these practices are not explicitly prohibited in the Bible, and are therefore allowed. Meanwhile, according to INC Minister Oni Santiago, Manalo lifted the prohibition on jewelry "when he began to like them." The reasons of Nicolas Perez here for leaving the INC would be consistent with the recollection of Eli Soriano, who Perez designated as a minister in 1972.) According to Teodoro Santiago, the third INC Minister to be ordained in the church, Manalo began to openly reject the deity of Christ around the year 1932, but still maintained that Jesus is Lord (Panginoong Hesukristo). By 1936, INC had 85,000 members. This figure grew to 200,000 by 1954. A Cebu congregation was built in 1937—the first to be established outside of Luzon, and the first in the Visayas. By 1938, Manalo threatened the INC brethren that he would leave the church and start anew, prompting a circular issued by Teodoro Santiago to submit their respective explanations (salaysay) to keep the church united. During World War II, Manalo was offered by the Japanese to lead the all-Filipino Evangelical Church of the Philippines (福音教会). His refusal led to Japanese suspicion and surveillance, to the point that Manalo acceded to the Japanese demand to have Prudencio Vasquez, division minister of Nueva Ecija and later of Bicol, as the Executive Minister of the Iglesia ni Cristo. This was formalized through a circular issued on 29 June 1942. Manalo resumed being the Executive Minister after the war. The first mission to Mindanao was commissioned in 1946. On 15 March 1948, the church was formally reconstituted through amendments to its Articles of Incorporation as the Iglesia Ni Cristo (INC), with a twofold name (Iglesia Ni Cristo and Church of Christ) used in English-speaking countries. Meanwhile, its first concrete chapel was built in Sampaloc, Manila also in 1948. Adherents fleeing for the provinces away from Manila, where the Japanese forces were concentrated during World War II, were used for evangelization. By 1950, Manalo himself claimed that the INC had 2 million members. The 1960 Census in the Philippines, however, showed adherents totaling to 270,104. By 1955, the overall educational attainment of INC members had also improved, with an estimated 35 percent of its total membership being considered literate. This, however, is lower than the national literacy rate of 75 percent in the same year. As Manalo's health began to fail in the 1950s, his son Eraño began taking leadership of the church. Manalo died on 12 April 1963.

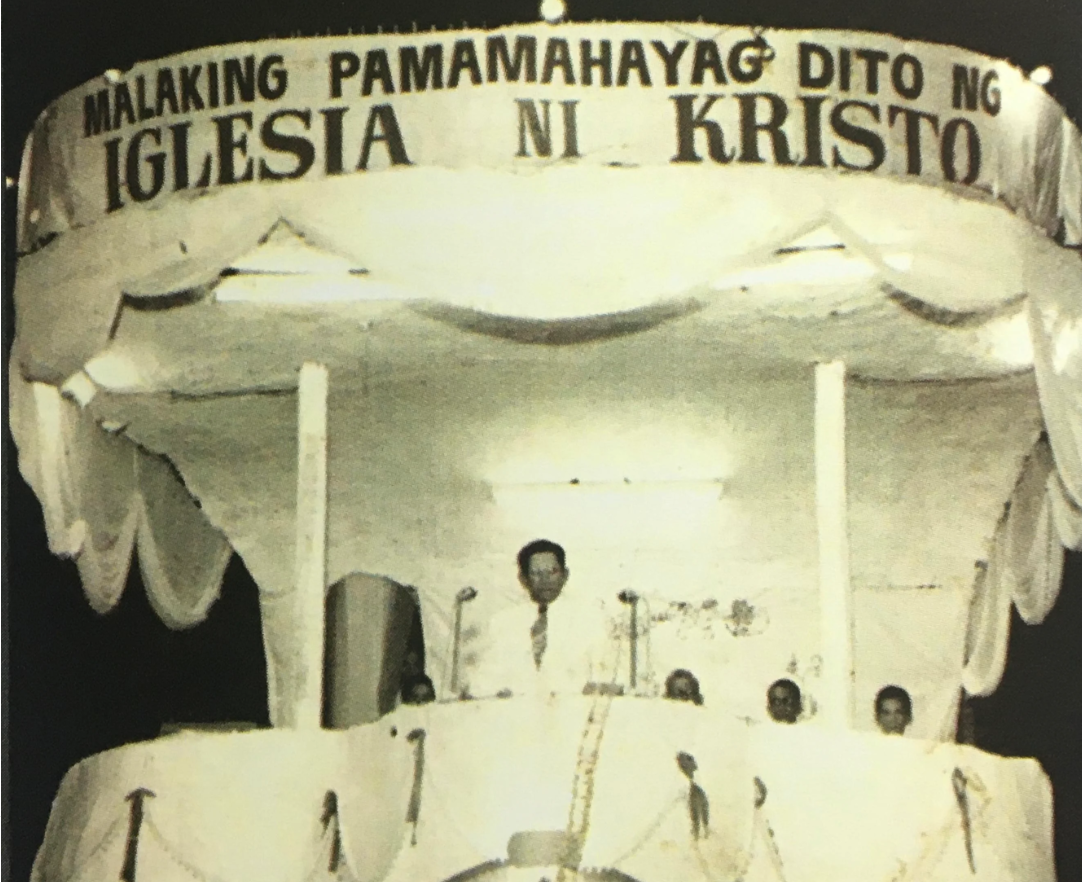
Grand Evangelical Rally (Malaking Pamamahayag) of the Iglesia Ni Cristo aimed to attract new members.

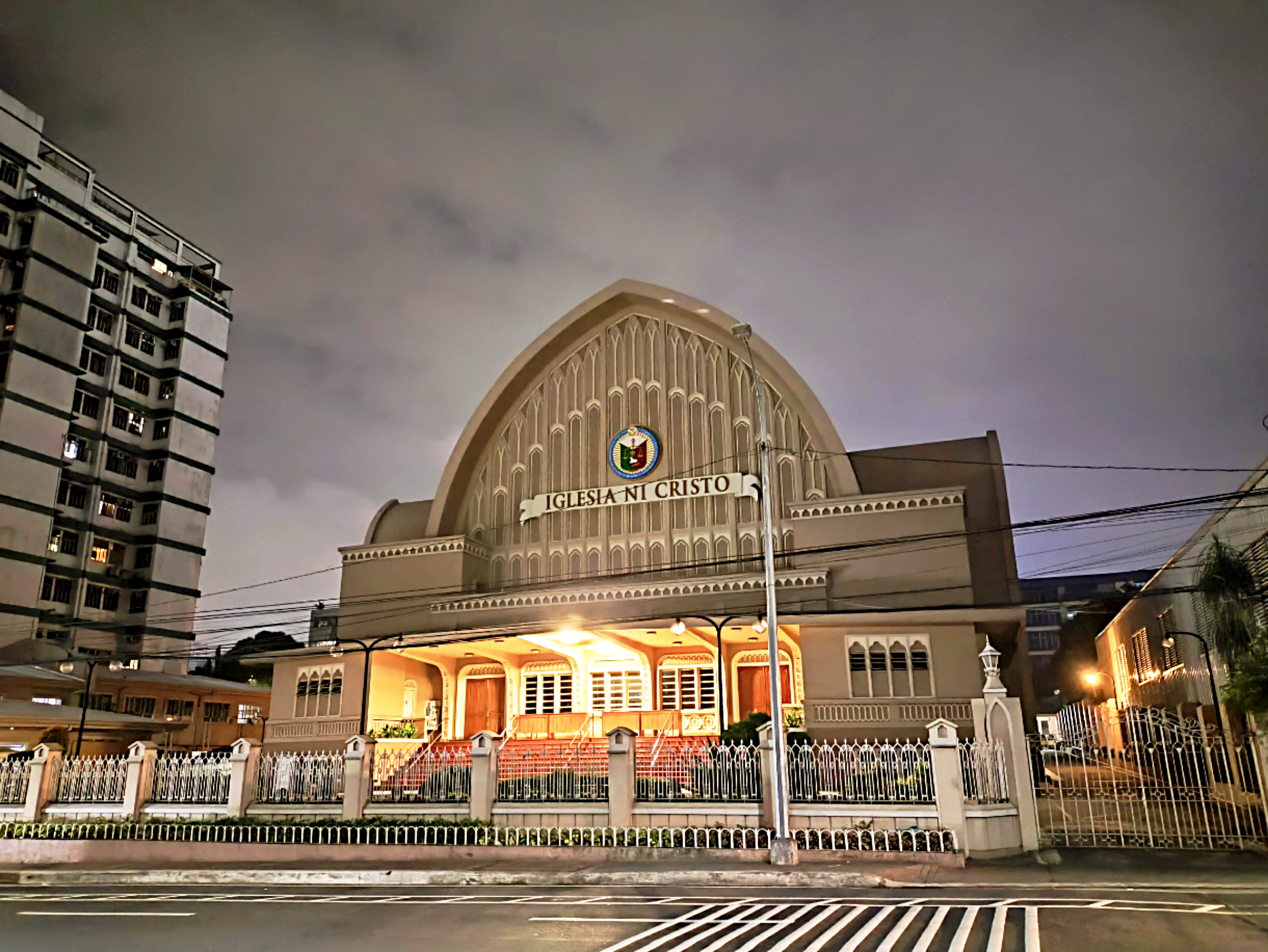
Completed in 1954, the Iglesia Ni Cristo (INC) Lokal ng Cubao in Quezon City is the first major chapel designed by Filipino Architect Carlos A. Santos-Viola for the INC. It is believed to have inspired future designs of INC chapels all over the Philippines.

=== International expansion ===
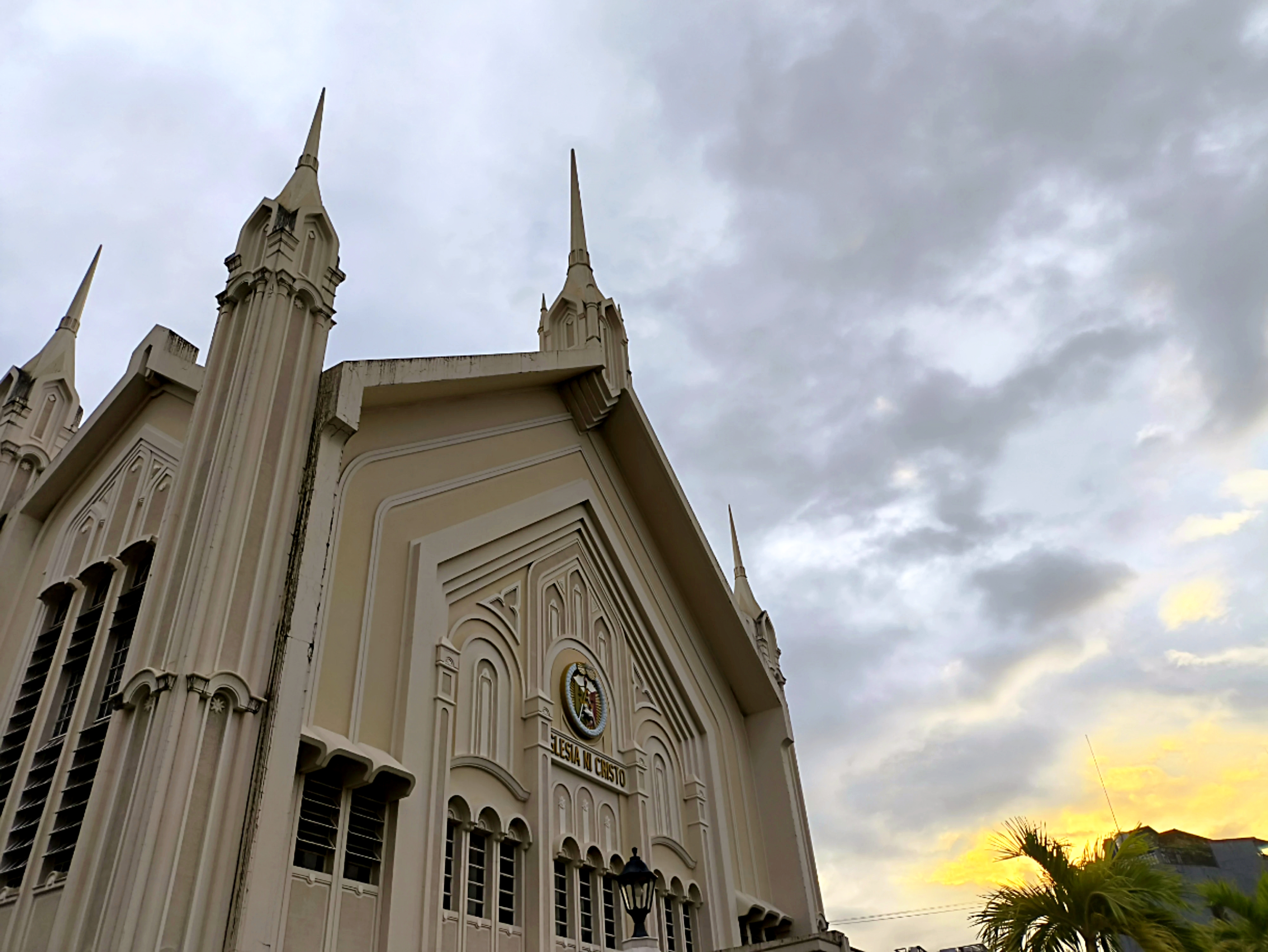
The INC Lokal ng Palanan, formerly known as the INC Lokal ng Makati, was formed as a congregation in 1955 by members from INC locales in Pasay and Manila. After being destroyed by fire, the current structure was rehabilitated and rededicated in 2011, becoming one of the first edifices in the Philippines to exhibit the modern architectural design of INC chapels.

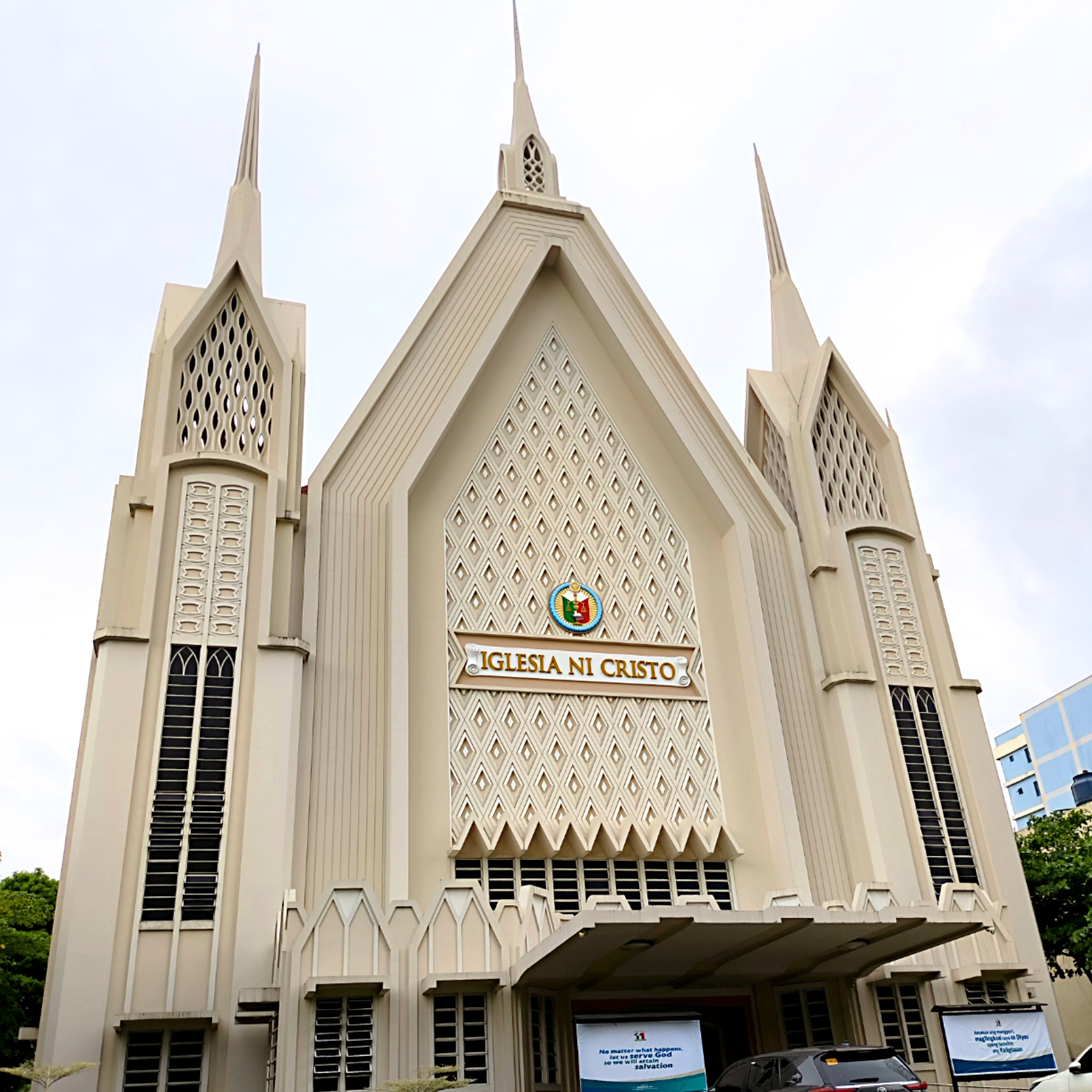
The INC Lokal ng Bago Bantay, completed on 4 December 1964, is currently the only INC chapel located along EDSA, a major thoroughfare in the Philippines.

While Felix Manalo during his lifetime was convinced on keeping the INC as exclusively Filipino, a reinterpretation and change in doctrine regarding Isaiah 43:5 prompted the INC to expand to the Western world, or what INC doctrine called the "Far West" (Malayong Kanluran). However, it must also be noted that this region, geographically speaking, would have been farther east of the Philippines instead of west. Still, the global expansion pushed through. It would be on 27 July 1968, when Eraño Manalo officiated the inaugural worship service of the church in Ewa Beach, Honolulu, Hawaii—the first mission of the INC outside the Philippines. The following month, INC established the San Francisco congregation. INC reached Europe through the United Kingdom in 1971 and Canada in 1973. INC established its first congregation in South Africa in 1978. INC established congregations in Guantánamo Bay, Cuba, in 1990; Rome, Italy, on 27 July 1994; Jerusalem, Israel, on 31 March 1996; and Athens, Greece, on 10 May 1997. In 1998, INC established 543 congregations and missions in 74 countries outside the Philippines.

During the 1970s INC boasted of having around 2,500 congregations. INC started operating a radio station in 1969; its first television program aired in 1983. The Ministerial Institute of Development, renamed as "Iglesia ni Cristo (Church of Christ) School for Ministers", was founded in 1974 in Quiapo, Manila, and moved to Quezon City in 1978. In 1971, the INC Central Office building was built in Quezon City. In 1984, the 7,000-seat Central Temple was added to the complex. The Tabernacle, a multipurpose tent-like building that can accommodate up to 4,000 people, was finished in 1989. The complex also includes the New Era University, a tertiary education institution run and managed by the INC. Eraño G. Manalo died on 31 August 2009. His son, Eduardo V. Manalo, succeeded him as executive minister upon his death.

=== 21st century ===
From 2009 to 2024, under the administration of Executive Minister Eduardo V. Manalo, the INC has reportedly built, renovated, or rededicated 4,083 church edifices or houses of worship (kapilya).

The Philippine Arena

On 21 July 2014, former President Benigno Aquino III and INC Executive Minister Eduardo V. Manalo led the inauguration of Ciudad de Victoria, a 140-hectare tourism zone in Bocaue and Santa Maria, Bulacan, where the Philippine Arena is also located. The Philippine Arena, a 55,000-seat multi-purpose structure owned by the INC, currently holds the Guinness World Record for the largest mixed-used indoor theater.

The Philippine government declared 2014 the "Iglesia ni Cristo Centennial Year" through Proclamation 815. On 27 July of the same year, the government announced a special non-working holiday to commemorate the 100th founding anniversary of Iglesia ni Cristo.

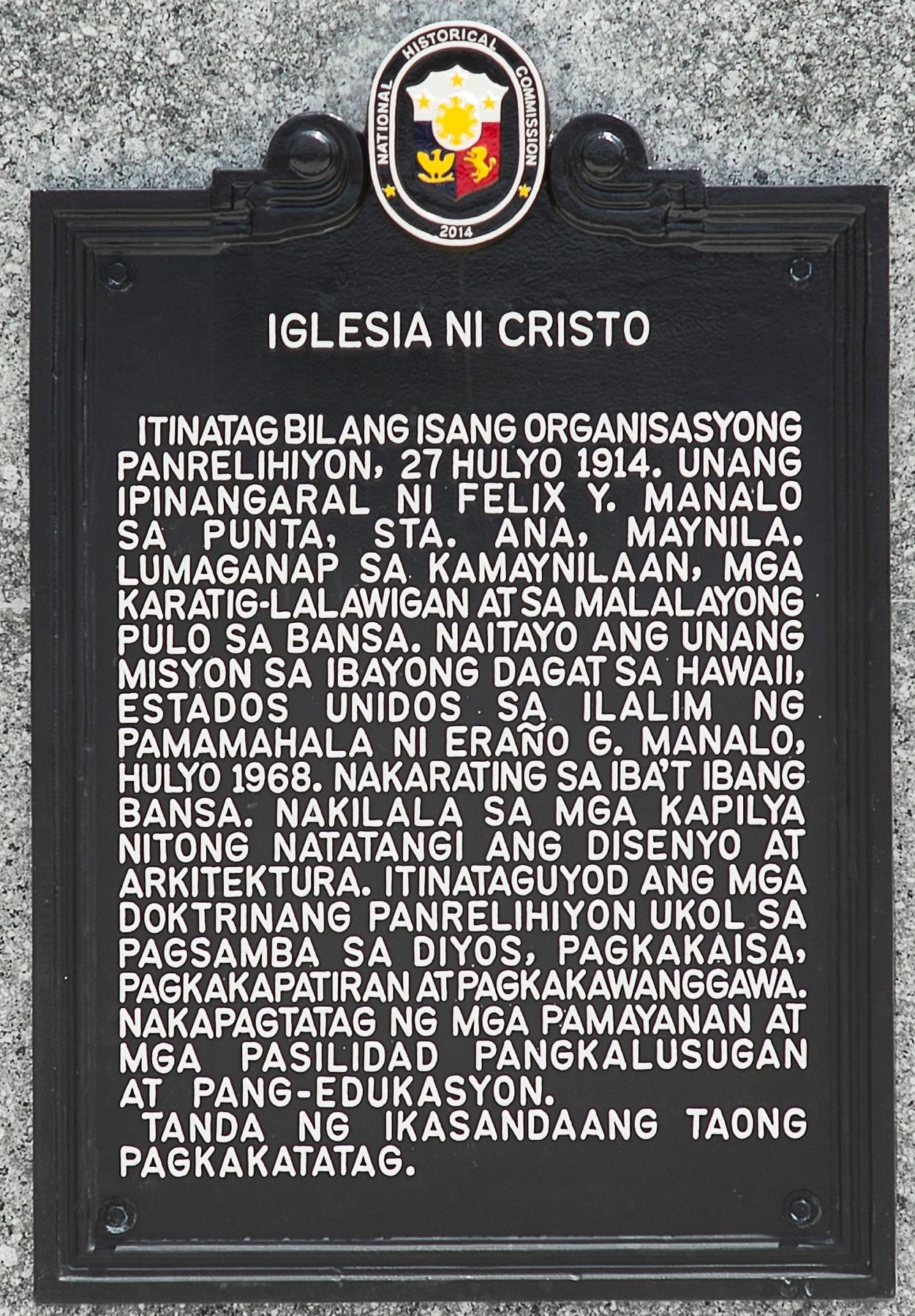
Historical marker unveiled by the National Historical Commission of the Philippines on 24 July 2014, at the main compound of INC to commemorate the centennial anniversary of the church

The INC celebrated its centennial anniversary at Ciudad de Victoria, with the Philippine Arena as the main venue, and in about 1,180 worship buildings worldwide through live video feed. The week-long celebration consisted of pyro-musical displays, a worship service led by Manalo, an oratorio, a musical presentation, a theatrical play, a quiz show, and an evangelical mission. The worship service for the INC centennial secured two Guinness World Records: the largest gospel choir with 4,745 members, and the largest mixed-use indoor theater for the Philippine Arena, which had 51,929 attendees. On 26 July 2015, INC capped its centennial year through activities such as International Unity Games, a worship service led by Manalo, and a Closing Centennial Celebration held in Washington, D.C., United States, and the Philippine Arena.

On 4 October 2015, INC, through VIVA Films, conducted the world premiere of Felix Manalo, a film depicting the origin of the INC and the life of its first executive minister, which was held at the Philippine Arena.

According to the resolution passed by the Senate of the Philippines to commemorate INC's 104th anniversary in 2018, the INC had established more than 7,000 congregations in 151 countries and territories worldwide.

On 6 May 2018, INC organized a charity walk in Manila, Philippines, with a recorded participation of 283,171 people, setting a new world record for the largest charity walk/run event. This surpassed their previous record of 175,509 participants set in 2014.

On 26 May 2025, Angelo Eraño V. Manalo, son of Eduardo, was unanimously elected as the deputy executive minister of the INC, which was held at the EVM Convention Center. Manalo later took oath in his office as the deputy executive minister on 31 May.

== Beliefs and core values ==
The INC Central Temple (Templo Central) in Quezon City was completed in 1984 and is the only INC building to date that is called a temple. According to architect Carlos A. Santos-Viola, in designing INC edifices, he had to create a style that could not "be mistaken for any other sect except Iglesia [ni Cristo]." He also related how Felix Manalo considered Gothic architecture to be the "most religious type of architecture" for its verticality, which was interpreted as "pointing towards Heaven."

Iglesia ni Cristo believes that it is the one true church established by Jesus of Nazareth in the first century CE. It posits that its registration in the Philippines—approximately two millennia after his death—is the fulfillment of a prophecy that Jesus's church would re-emerge in the Far East (Malayong Silangan) via Felix Manalo. Because of the similarities it shares with the Christian movement known as Restorationism, INC's doctrines have been described as Restorationist.

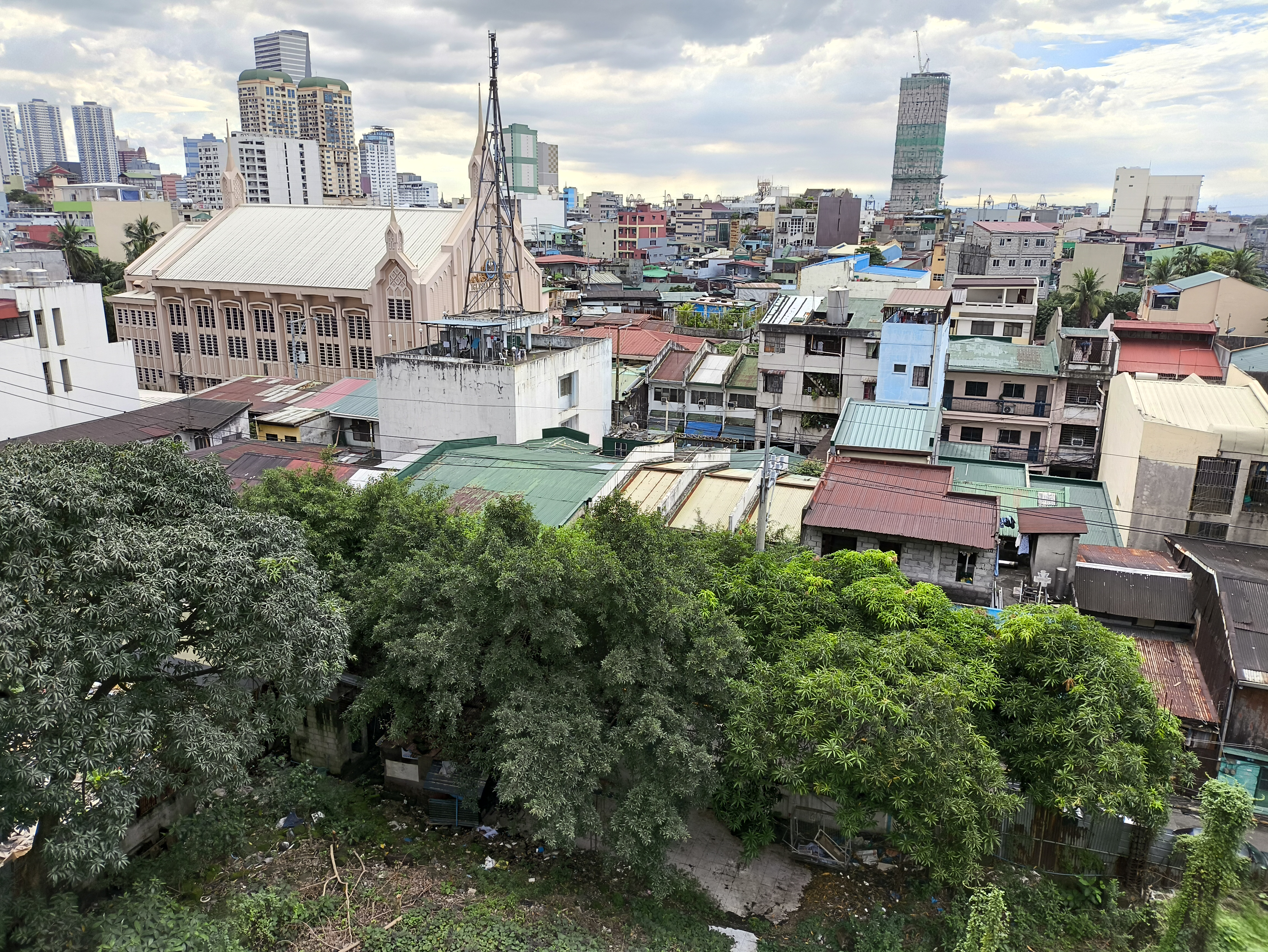
The Iglesia Ni Cristo (INC) Lokal ng Tayuman (lit. 'Locality of Tayuman') is the second-oldest congregation of the church, established after the congregation at Punta in Santa Ana, Manila. The chapel is located along Apitong Street in Santa Cruz, Manila. Manila City Council Resolution No. 431, series of 2015, urged the National Historical Commission of the Philippines to recognize the locale as a historic site.

=== Bible ===
The Iglesia ni Cristo believes that the Christian Bible is the only sacred text inspired by God. Therefore, it is the sole basis of all the group's beliefs and practices. The INC uses the Protestant Bible, which includes 66 canonized texts. Members are discouraged from independent Bible reading, for only INC ministers have the authority (may karapatan) to interpret and teach scripture. However, Manalo was even stricter regarding who could preach and teach in the movement. According to him, only the Executive Minister of the Iglesia ni Cristo can truthfully teach on the Bible.

=== God the Father, Jesus Christ and the Holy Spirit ===
The Iglesia ni Cristo believes that God the Father is the creator deity and the only true God. The INC regards the traditional, mainstream Christian doctrine of the Trinity as heresy, adopting a version of unitarianism. The church holds that its position was attested by Jesus and the 12 apostles in the New Testament.

Christ and the Apostles are united in teaching how many and who is the real God. Similar to other true Christians, according to Apostle Paul, there is only one God, the Father—not the Son and more so not the Holy Spirit. The Apostles also did not teach that there is one God who has three personas who are also Gods. ... It [Trinity] is not found in the Holy Scriptures or the Bible, and if [Catholic] priests ever use the Bible to prove this teaching of theirs, all are based only on suppositions and presumptions.

— trans. from Pasugo (November 1968)

The church believes that Jesus is the Son of God, the mediator between God the Father and humanity, and a creation of God the Father. God sanctified him to be without sin, and bestowed upon him the titles "Lord" and "Son of God". The church sees Jesus as God's highest creation and that he was a human, denying the divinity of Jesus. Adherents profess belief in the theory of substitutionary atonement as well as in the redemption of humankind. Jesus is believed to have been "foreordained before the foundation of the world" and sent by God "to deal with sin". Members believe they "are saved by Christ's blood", who died because of his "self-sacrificing love".

INC believes that the Holy Spirit is the power of God, not a deity, having been sent by God the Father and Jesus to guide God's people. According to INC doctrine, there are seven gifts of the Holy Spirit (or seven Holy Spirits), which is based on the church's interpretation of Revelation 5:6.

The Iglesia ni Cristo's doxology, however, continues to use a trinitarian formula, which the INC has officially rejected. The INC's doxology was derived from bishop Thomas Ken's 1674 work "Praise God, from whom all blessings flow."

Tagalog	Official English Text
"Purihin natin ang Amá;	"Praise God, our Father up above;
Mabuhay sa pag-ibig ng Anák;	Proclaim the love of His beloved Son;
Taglayín ang Espíritung Banál;	Receive the Holy Spirit's gift;
Ang Dios ay lagì nating sambahín.	Forever worship our Almighty God.
Amen"	Amen"

=== One true church ===
The Iglesia ni Cristo flag is believed to be inspired by the Flag of Italy, the tricolor template of green, white, and red of which was first used in banners of Napoleonic Italy (1796). As for the INC, the colors were intended to represent faith, hope, and love, while the seven-branched candelabrum, the Menorah, of Judaism represents the church in the Christian Bible.

The Iglesia ni Cristo believes that it is the one true church (bayang banal) and founded by Jesus, having been restored by Felix Manalo in the last days (mga huling araw). It believes that the first-century church—or the fourth-century church—apostasized, instead following false teachings. The INC argues that this apostate church became the Catholic Church. The INC has posited that no true church can experience schisms, splits, or separations. Its establishment is hailed as the harbinger of the End of Days.

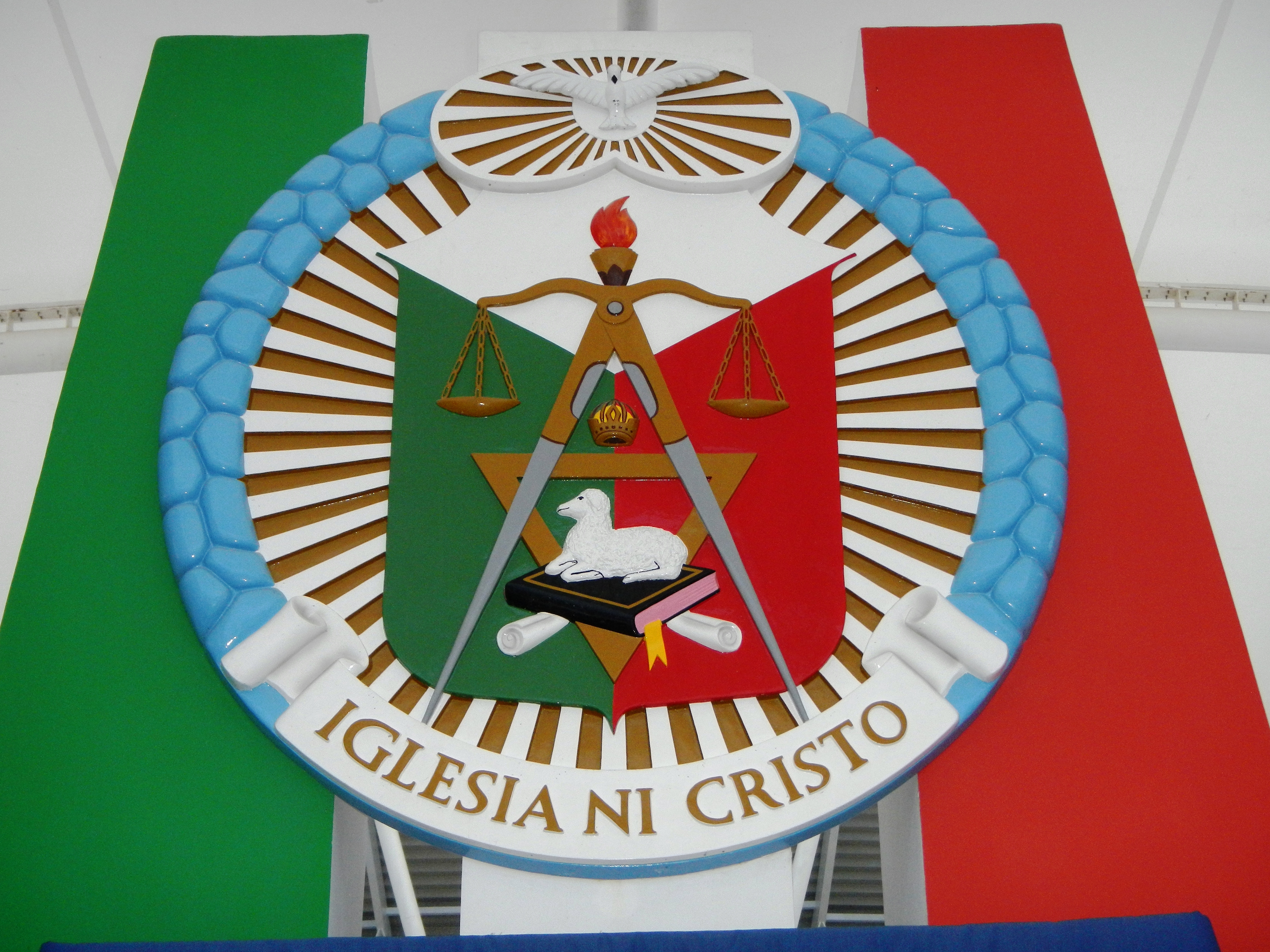
The official INC seal, which features the church's version of the Agnus Dei, a symbol representing Jesus, whereby the banner and the cross bore by the Lamb of God are replaced by the weighing scale and the Square and Compasses of Freemasonry. The dove represents the Holy Spirit. Notably, God the Father is not represented on the official INC logo. Also featured in the seal is the tricolor shield of the INC. Like the church flag, it is believed to be inspired by the Flag of Italy; green, white, and red were first used in banners of Napoleonic Italy (1796).

The church believes that the Iglesia ni Cristo is the fulfillment of the Hebrew Biblical Isaiah 43:5, with the "far east" (Malayong Silangan) referring to the Philippines, where the Church of Christ would allegedly be founded. According to the official INC publication Pasugo, however, there is no explicit mention of the Philippines in the Bible. The "far east" may include the nations of Asia in general. According to Felix Manalo, the INC was established for the "other sheep" (John 10:16) and "those who are far off" (Acts 2:38–39), which Manalo interpreted to be strictly about Filipinos only. Thus, internationalization of the INC never occurred during the lifetime of Manalo, keeping the church exclusively Filipino. INC teaches that its members constitute the "elect of God". God's grace and faith in Jesus are insufficient to save humans; instead, only INC membership brings about one's salvation, and there is no salvation outside the Iglesia ni Cristo. Marriages and relationships, in general, between members and non-members are prohibited by the church. However, those outside the church prior to the foundation of the INC in 1914 will be judged and saved according to the law that is written in their hearts. Aligned with this, Manalo claimed that Filipino nationalist José Rizal was holy (banal), despite never being a member of the Iglesia ni Cristo (Rizal died in 1896), and preached that they owed their religious freedom from Rizal. As members of the same church, members are not allowed to sue each other in court. The Iglesia ni Cristo is also particular about the official name of the true church, which they say is "Church of Christ or Iglesia ni Cristo (in Tagalog)", although historically the church has changed its name from the originally registered Iglesia ni Kristo (INK). The two passages often cited by INC to support this, although none of them referred to the church as a proper noun, are Romans 16:16 "Greet one another with a holy kiss. The churches of Christ greet you", and the George Lamsa translation of Acts 20:28: "Take heed therefore ... to feed the church of Christ which he has purchased with his blood." (Note: Lamsa's church, the Holy Apostolic Catholic Assyrian Church of the East, affirmed the Trinity, and adhered to the doctrines espoused in the First Council of Nicaea and the First Council of Constantinople.) Despite the aforementioned verses being the alleged basis for their church name, INC members in general do not practice the holy kiss.

=== Felix Manalo as the founder ===
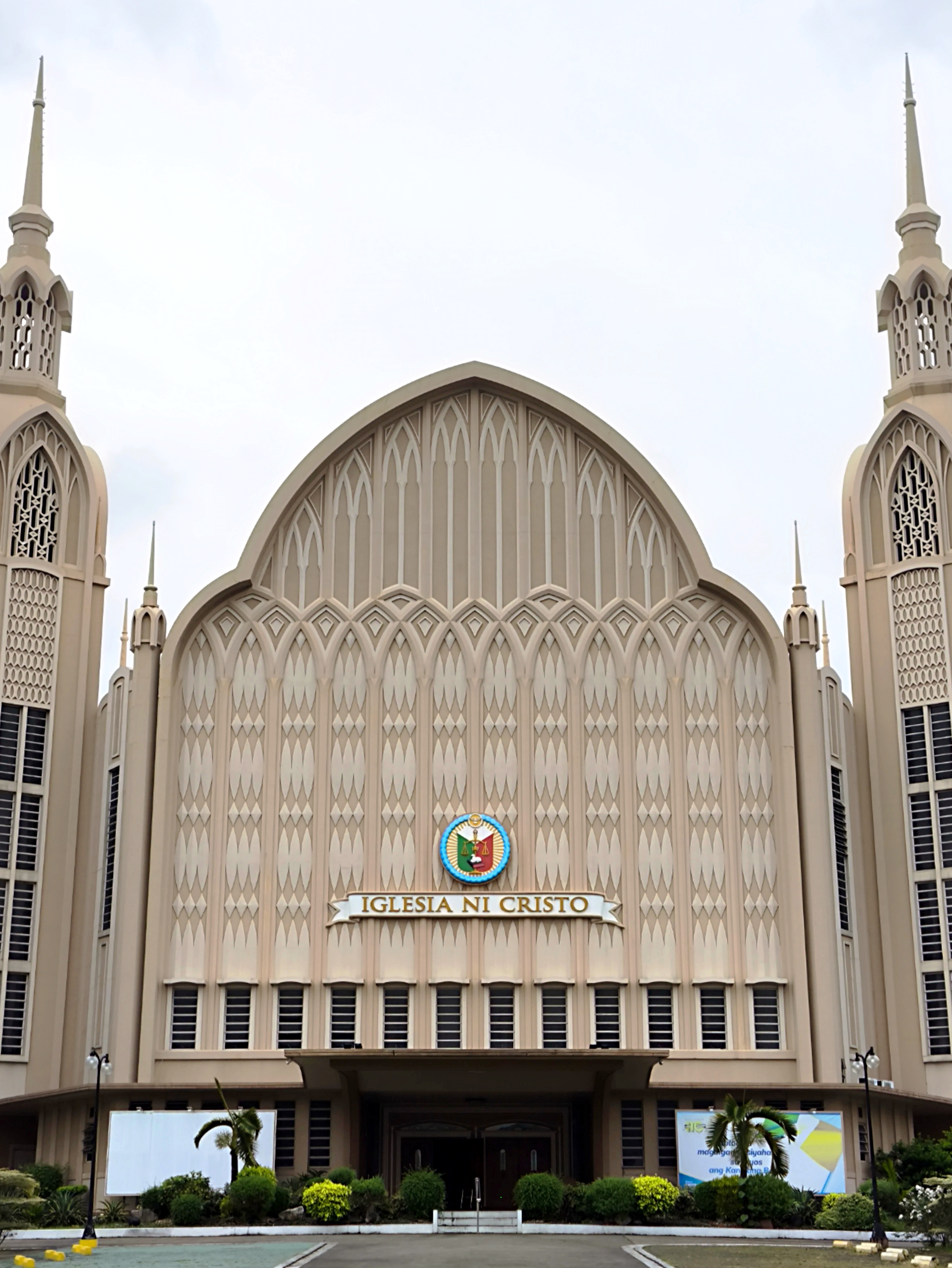
Completed on 27 July 1962, the Iglesia Ni Cristo (INC) Lokal ng San Francisco del Monte, also known locally as the Lokal ng Frisco, is one of the major chapels designed by Architect Carlos A. Santos-Viola for the INC. It was also one of the last chapels dedicated during the lifetime of INC founder Felix Manalo, later serving as the site of his funeral in 1963. Prior to the construction of the current structure of the INC Lokal ng Tondo (1967) and the INC Lokal ng Templo Central (1984), the INC Lokal ng Frisco was the largest INC chapel in terms of seating capacity at 3,200.

According to the INC, although admittedly Manalo's name cannot be found in the Bible (neither in the Old Testament nor the New Testament), the church believes that Manalo is the "angel from the East" mentioned in Revelation 7:1–3 who started preaching about the restored church during the End Times. The verse reads:

I saw four angels standing at the four corners of the earth, holding the four winds of the earth, that the wind should not blow on the earth, on the sea, or on any tree. Then I saw another angel ascending from the east, having the seal of the living God. And he cried with a loud voice to the four angels to whom it was granted to harm the earth and the sea, saying, "Do not harm the earth, the sea, or the trees till we have sealed the servants of our God on their foreheads."

This is the start of the period, according to INC, being referred to in the Bible as the ends of the earth (cf Is 41:9–10; 43:5–6), the time when the end of the world is near, even at the very doors (cf. Mt. 24:3, 33), which began with the outbreak of a war of global proportions (cf. Mt. 24:6–7) Manalo is from the Philippines, which they say is in the "center" of the Far East. The "four winds" in Revelation 7:1–3, they say refers to World War I and the four angels are the four leaders known as The Big Four (Woodrow Wilson, David Lloyd George, Georges Clemenceau, and Vittorio Orlando) (Note: Out of all four world figures believed by the INC to be angels, only Woodrow Wilson was publicly known to be a Christian (a Presbyterian to be specific). In addition, there is no historical record of Felix Manalo interacting with any of the four world leaders.) who they say worked on the prevention of the winds of war.

Still, INC theology considers Jesus Christ as its founder, the first of God's four messengers of the church era, with Manalo's task being to reestablish the church in the Far East (Malayong Silangan).

Manalo is also portrayed as the fulfillment of several passages in Isaiah and other books of the Bible, including the one Isaiah 46:11 called the "bird of prey" (ibong mandaragit).

As the one who sent by God to restore the INC, Manalo became the first executive minister and spiritual leader of the church. As such, he taught that what is written in the Bible was the ultimate authority in all aspects of the church, and effectively as a messenger of God, Manalo is "the foremost Biblical authority for all humanity and the divinely designated leader of a reestablished Church of Christ in the modern world."

The INC celebrates the birth anniversary of Felix Manalo every May.

=== Martin Luther as the predecessor ===
INC members believe the doctrine that there are four messengers of God in the church era, namely Jesus Christ, Paul the Apostle, Martin Luther, and Felix Manalo, with Manalo being the "Last Messenger." Also according to the INC, German reformist and theologian Martin Luther was the second angel mentioned in Revelation 14:8, which reads as follows.

And another angel followed, saying,

"Babylon is fallen, is fallen, that great city, because she has made all nations drink of the wine of the wrath of her fornication."

Therefore, as Luther was also ordained to be God's messenger by challenging the Catholic Church and becoming a key figure of the Protestant Reformation, he was considered by the church as a predecessor to Manalo, who was also accorded the recognition of being an angel.

=== Baptism ===
The church believes that baptism is done by immersion baptism or Believer's baptism by adults in water, and that it is necessary that people be baptized in the Iglesia ni Cristo to become disciples of Jesus Christ. While Jesus was baptized according to the Gospels, Felix Manalo, as the church founder, was himself not baptized in the fold of the INC. Church doctrine justified this by comparing Manalo's standing with that of Paul the Apostle and John the Baptist (that is, Manalo as Ang Tanging Sugo na may Dalawang Pagkahalal sa Karapatan). The church rejects infant baptism. Newborn children of members are instead dedicated to God through a congregational prayer, led by an ordained minister of the INC.

On 7 September 2019, the INC set the Guinness World Record for most people baptized in a single event through its "Grand Baptism" at the Philippine Arena with 18,272 newly baptized members. Of this number, 94 were non-Filipinos (foreigners).

=== Expulsion ===
Members who are not living in accordance with the doctrines taught in the INC are reported (ulat) and admonished, usually by requiring the violating member to explain (salaysay). Those who continue in violation of INC doctrines after being admonished are expelled or excommunicated from the INC (tiwalag), thus losing salvation. Former members have reportedly experienced shunning and ostracism from the faithful INC members. As such, the church does not believe in the perseverance of the saints. Certain violations, such as eating blood, (Note: Pig blood is a major ingredient of Dinuguan, which is a popular dish in the Philippines. Other Filipino food which may have blood as ingredient include Pinuneg, Batchoy, Pinikpikan, Tinola, Pinapaitan, and Betamax (grilled blood).) having too long of an absence from church services, (Note: Members who skip worship services or madalang sumamba, regardless of the reasons involved, will be mandated to attend for eight consecutive worship services to remove the status of being considered "habitually absent.") drinking alcohol, eloping, or having a relationship (including marriage) with a non-member, may result in mandatory expulsion.

=== Eschatology and resurrection ===
INC believes that a person is composed of a body ("vehicle"), soul ("individual"), and spirit ("life" or fuel). Members believe that when a person dies, their body and soul both die, they will become ineligible for salvation, and go into the grave where both will remain until the Second Coming of Christ, whereas the spirit will go back to God. The church does not believe there will be a millennial reign of Christ. Upon Christ's return, all dead servants of God, from the time of the patriarchs up to the last days, would be resurrected to join living faithful and loyal INC members. They will be rewarded by living in the Holy City or New Jerusalem, together with God the Father, and Jesus Christ. At the right time chosen by God, a second resurrection would occur, and non-INC members will experience second death which is the Lake of Fire (Dagát-dagatang Apóy).

The church believes that God set a day where he will judge all people. They believe that this day is also the Second Coming of Jesus Christ.

=== LGBTQ rights ===
The church believes that God created gender binary. According to INC doctrine, same-sex relationships are prohibited, and being involved in such relationships is sinful.

=== Membership in organizations and labor unions ===
The INC does not believe members should join organizations or labor unions which run counter to their doctrines and teachings. The policy comes from an interpretation of the Second Epistle to the Corinthians where members of the church should not join any organization with non-members. Joining social gatherings with non-INC members such as proms and parties are also prohibited by the INC. The legality of a closed shop firing INC members based on their religious convictions reached the Supreme Court in 1974. The court ruled in favour of the INC member, holding that the provision of the law exempting those with religious objections to union membership from closed shop agreements is constitutional.

=== Christmas and other holidays ===
The INC does not celebrate Christmas, Easter, Passover, Halloween, Valentine's Day, and other holidays the church considers as "pagan" of origin, although it allows the celebration of other occasions also of "pagan" origin such as birthdays. In lieu of these holidays, the INC celebrates Thanksgiving (pasasalamat) during its anniversary celebration in July, and at the end of the year in December. (Note: The INC used to celebrate its anniversary on 25 December, Christmas Day, which was the baptism date of the first members of the INC (in 1913), and was also the date of Felix Manalo's ordination as a minister (in 1918). However, the church administration has since moved the INC anniversary celebration to the date of its registration to the Philippine government. According to INC Minister Igmidio Zabala, offerings were also made during Manalo's birth anniversary.) Despite having "pagan" origins, the church also celebrates the New Year. Bringing offerings (lagak) to the church during Thanksgiving events are commanded. The church teaches that the greater the offering (abuloy or handog), the greater is the faith.

Without rejecting the celebration of Christmas, however, Felix Manalo preached that the meaning of Christmas is peace and the good news that Jesus was born to bring salvation. This concept of adopting Christmas in INC doctrine was carried over by other INC writers such as Emiliano Agustin, who wrote "Sa Paskong marilag tanggapin sa puso, Ang Kapayapaang mahigit sa ginto" (Accept this majestic Christmas in your hearts, this Peace which is greater than gold), and Conrado Salonga, who wrote "Tila kailan lang ang dating kahapon, Pasko na naman, narito na ngayon, Kaya naman kahit munting paghahandog, ay aking nilayon" (It seemed like yesterday, it's already Christmas today, so I aim to give, even a little offering). According to a 1969 article of General Evangelist Bienvenido Santiago, Sr., "Hindi kami tumututol na ipagdiwang ang kapanganakan ni Kristo." (We are not against the celebration of the birth of Christ). In a 1980s radio interview with Manolo Favis, INC Minister Oni Santiago related how during the lifetime of Felix Manalo, the INC still celebrated Christmas. Santiago observed that it was only a recent phenomenon (that is, reckoning from the time of the interview) that Christmas was prohibited and was replaced by the INC Thanksgiving because, according to him, offerings decreased when members used up their resources for buying Christmas gifts instead of giving them to the church. During World War II, the INC also observed Easter, which it had done so with Evangelical churches in the Philippines.

== Practices ==
=== Worship and prayer ===
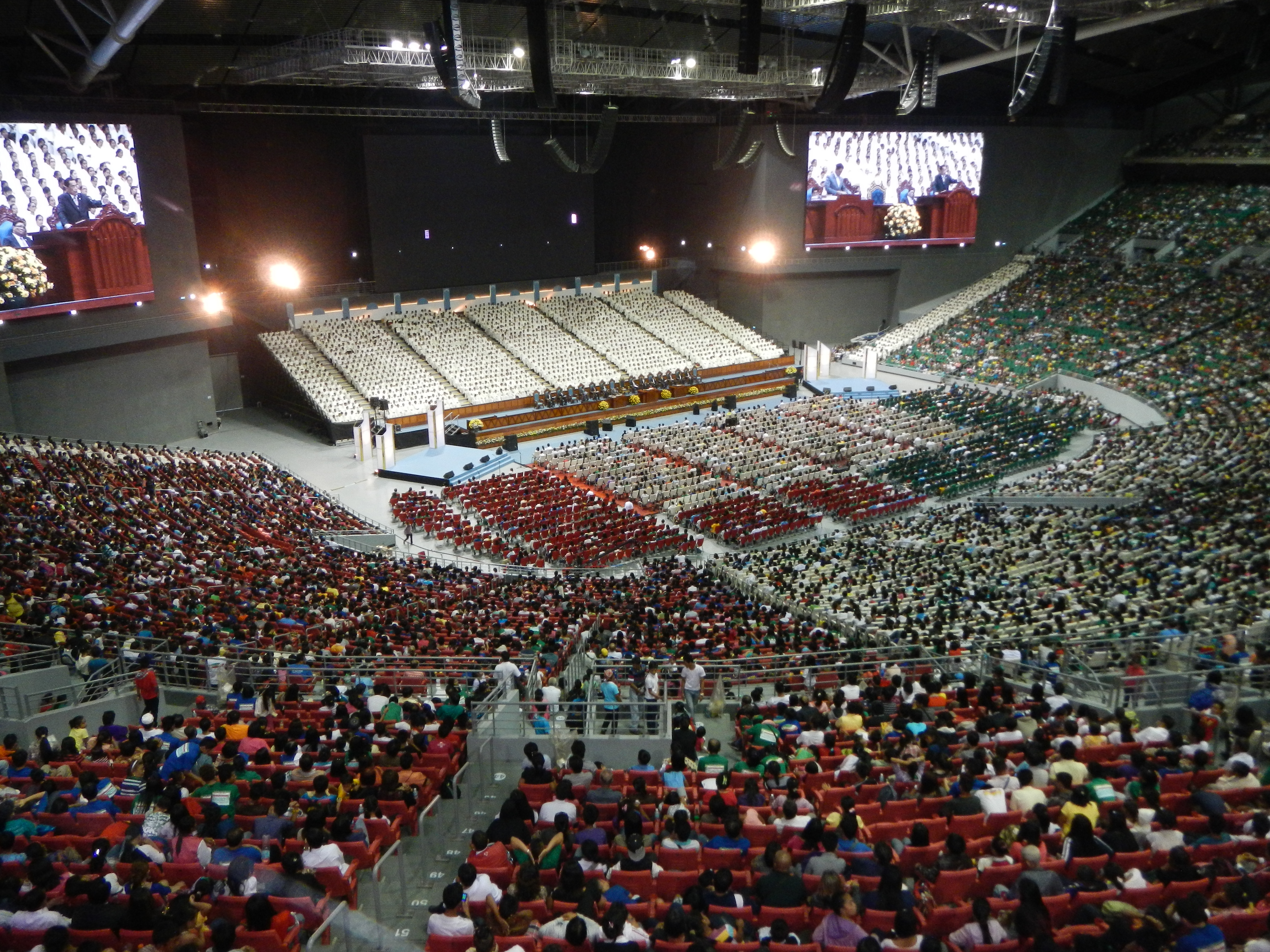
A missionary gathering inside the Philippine Arena.

The church conducts mandatory regular worship services (samba) twice during the week, usually scheduled on Thursdays and Sundays (there are also Wednesday, Friday, and Saturday schedules depending on the locale). (Note: The schedule of INC worship services could be changed, such as the rescheduling of Sunday services in select areas due to the National Rally for Peace (13 January 2025), the "One Faith, One Hope, One Love" Anniversary Concert (7 September 2025), the Trillion Peso March (21 September 2025), and the Rally for Transparency and a Better Democracy (also known as Peaceful Rally for Transparency, 16 November 2025).) The INC also practices sex segregation during worship and mandates its own strict dress code or proper attire which members should be allowed to wear. The church itself describes the INC prescribed clothing as conservative and "holy array." According to INC Minister Igmidio Zabala, midweek services were introduced in the church by 1922. While Zabala credits the development of midweek worship services to Felix Manalo himself, Teodoro Santiago attributed this to INC Minister Justino Casanova, who during Manalo's trip to the United States (1919–1921) began presiding worship services during Wednesdays. Upon returning to the Philippines, it was Manalo's decision to settle with the Thursday schedule.

These services are conducted in the local languages (providing sign language interpreters and translators in some congregations). It consists of singing of hymns, prayers, studies of the bible, collection of voluntary offerings (abuloy or handog, while the building fund is called tanging handugan), and benediction. Both God the Father and Jesus Christ are worshiped, despite church doctrine denying the divinity of Christ. The ministers of every congregation in a given worship service use the same sermon outline prepared by the executive minister. Deacons (diyakono) and Deaconesses (diyakonesa) guide worshipers to their seats and collect voluntary offerings. The singing of hymns is led by the locale's choir. The first hymnbook, termed Ang Himnario ng Iglesia ni Cristo, which consists of over 300 songs, was published in 1937. To date, the church has over 500 hymns. INC Head Deacon Melanio Gabriel, however, claimed that the INC "copied" its hymns and songs from existing Christian music produced by other churches and denominations. Children's worship services (Tagalog: Pagsamba ng Kabataan, or PNK) are held every weekend. They use similar lessons as the standard worship services taught using the Socratic method (question and answer). Church attendance is strictly monitored through attendance forms and QR codes provided by the INC. Gadgets and electronic devices such as cellphones and smartwatches are banned from being used during worship services, or even brought inside church premises. As such, church members are required to surrender all their gadgets and electronic devices prior to entering and participating in worship services. Photography, videography, and other recording activities inside the church are also prohibited. Church members are mandated to attend their respective locales or congregations where they are enrolled or registered. If any member will be moving for whatever reason, a transfer to the new locale or congregation must be filed with the church administration. Transfers are valid for 30 days. The church teaches that willfully forsaking the worship service is a grievous sin, usually prompting congregational action such as visits (dalaw), thus members are expected to attend the congregational worship services twice a week without fail.

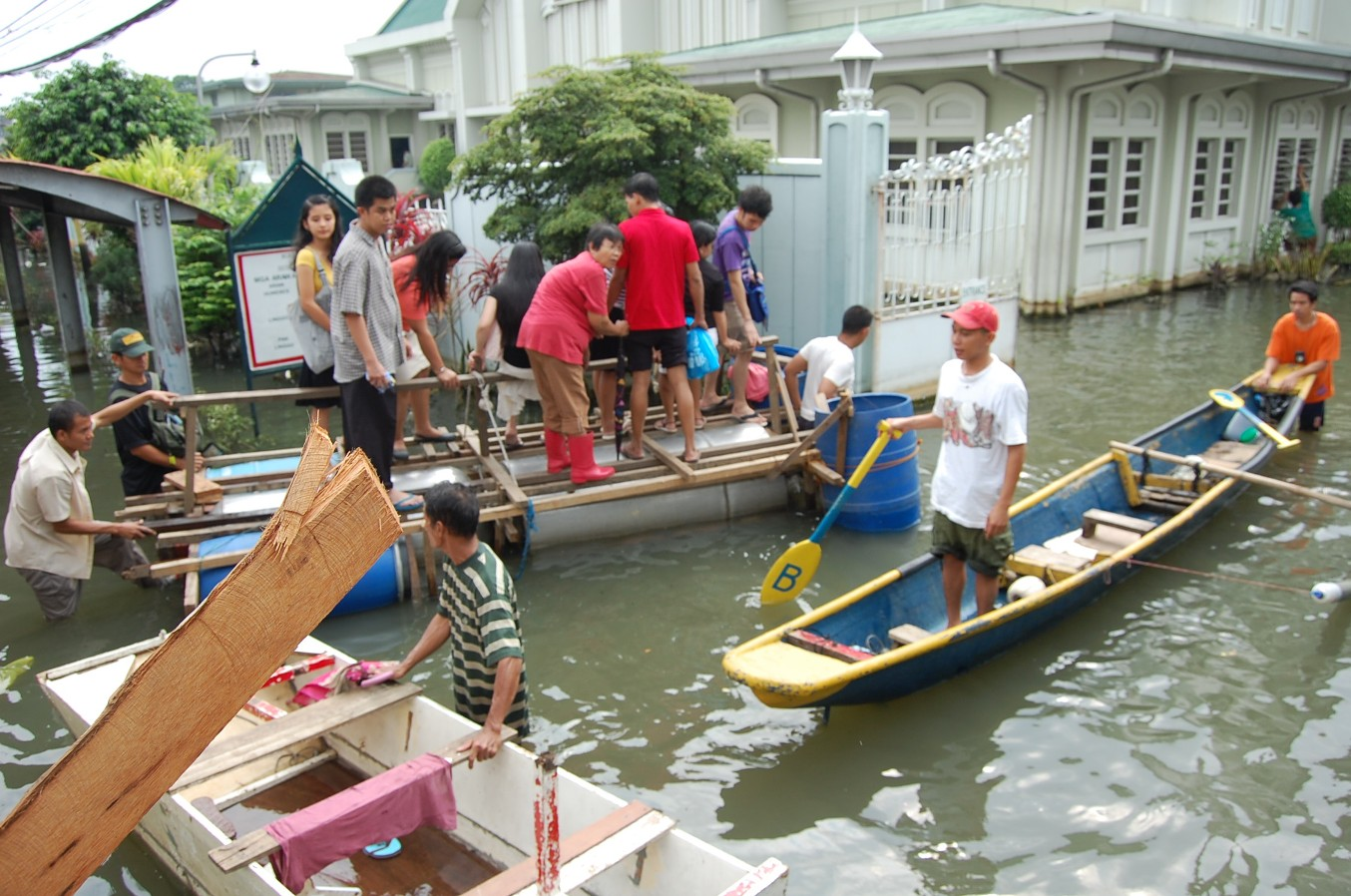
INC worship services still proceed as scheduled despite rains and flooding. This photo was taken at the wake of Tropical Storm Ondoy.

The church encourages its members to take up a ministry (tungkulin), attend weekly committee meetings (pulong), and make prayer a part of everyday life (panata). Thus, prayer before various activities, such as taking meals, travelling, and going to sleep, are commonly practiced. Prayers recited in rote repetition are not observed. Instead, INC members believe that prayers are meant to make known their requests to God. Also according to INC doctrine, prayers are answered by God if they are done in faith and in obedience to God's commands. The Executive Minister of the Iglesia ni Cristo is usually a theme in prayers of INC members.

Besides repetitive prayers, the INC also rejects prayer for the dead. Following this, INC members are prohibited from celebrating All Saints' Day (1 November) and All Souls' Day (2 November), in addition to the holidays they are banned to celebrate. According to INC doctrine, remembering the departed is not allowed because they have already lost consciousness, and will not be granted salvation until they experience resurrection and receive eternal life. Regardless of the person being a member of the INC or not, death separates the person from the one true church and does not enjoy the same benefits as the living. (Note: The church hymn "Ako'y Iglesia Ni Cristo" (I am Church of Christ) exemplifies this doctrine as exhibited in the lyrics "Si Cristo ay susundin ko, anuman ang kasapitan, Ako'y Iglesia Ni Cristo, hanggang kamatayan" (Christ I will follow, no matter what I suffer, I am Church of Christ, until death).) Therefore, the dead are ineligible to be saved.

=== Evangelism ===
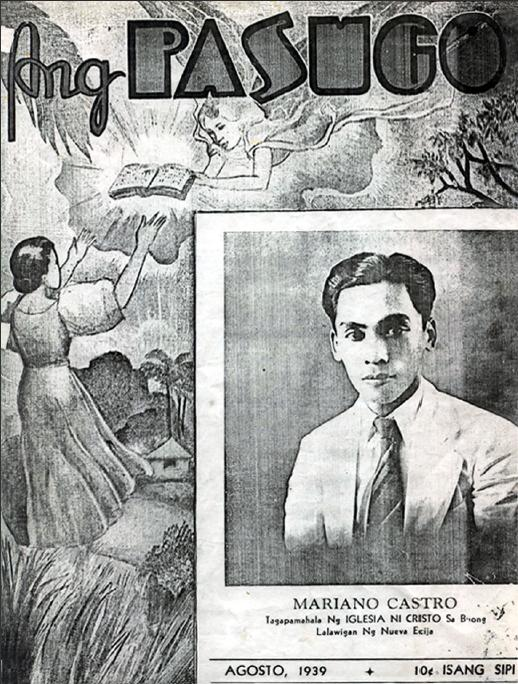
Cover of the August 1939 issue of the Pasugo featuring an artist's depiction of the "angel from the East", and a photograph of INC Minister Mariano Castro, who later served as a religious mentor to Eraño Manalo

INC members have the responsibility to share their faith to others (who according to INC doctrine are "slaves to corruption"), and are mandated to "bear fruit" by bringing in new prospects (akay), particularly during evangelical missions (stylized as EVangelical Mission, with the letters EVM capitalized), to learn INC doctrines through Bible studies and worship services.

Since February 1939, the church has been publishing Pasugo (officially translated as God's Message) in both Tagalog and English. Filipino was the only language used since its inception in 1939 until 1953. Currently, about two-thirds of its pages are devoted to the English-speaking population. Felix Manalo wrote its first editorial where he stated the publication's purpose, including the propagation of the faith. Issues contain articles which detail INC doctrines and refute doctrines which it considers as heresy, such as the Trinity. It also features information on church history, educational programs and missionary achievements, including lists and photographs of newly dedicated chapels. In 2001, it had a monthly circulation of 235,000 copies. For the year 2009, there were more than four million copies of Pasugo distributed worldwide. According to Similarweb, the official website of Pasugo has 7,381 monthly visits as of 2025.

In the Philippines, through the Christian Era Broadcasting Service International Incorporated (CEBSI Incorporated), INC broadcasts programs that discuss Bible teachings over the radio and television. These programs are aired by about 60 other radio stations all over the Philippines (i.e. INC Radio- DZEM 954kHz) and several more in the US and Australia. INCTV 48, which is carried on all cable providers in the Philippines and some channels in the US Direct TV ch 2068, telecast the INC's religious programs. These programs can also be seen in the Internet via one of the organisation's news website.

Although the INC claims that membership numbers does not necessarily make a religion true, and appeal to popularity should not be counted as a binding justification for acceptance, the church nonetheless holds regular religious gatherings called evangelical missions which aim to attract more followers. (Note: Said mass meetings were earlier billed as Malaking Pamamahayag, Grand Evangelical Rally, and Grand Evangelical Mission (GEM), without the stylization of letters.) On 28 February 2012, INC held its largest Philippine-wide evangelical missions simultaneously on 19 sites across the country. In Manila site alone, more than 600,000 people attended the event. On 13 April 2013, INC launched Lingap-Pamamahayag under its project Kabayan Ko, Kapatid Ko (English: My Countrymen, My Brethren), which incorporates outreach missions to its evangelical missions. On 26 September 2015, INC held its first worldwide evangelical mission at the Philippine Arena as the main venue and in 2,125 sites throughout the world through video conferencing. It was officiated by INC executive minister, Eduardo Manalo.

Year	Number of INC congregations	Average congregation size	Growth indicator
1936	850	100	
1963	1,285	210	▲
1976	2,500	190	▲
1994	5,200	340	▲
2014	4,800	550	▼
2025	5,968	500	▲
2026	5,772	500	▼

=== Outreach ===
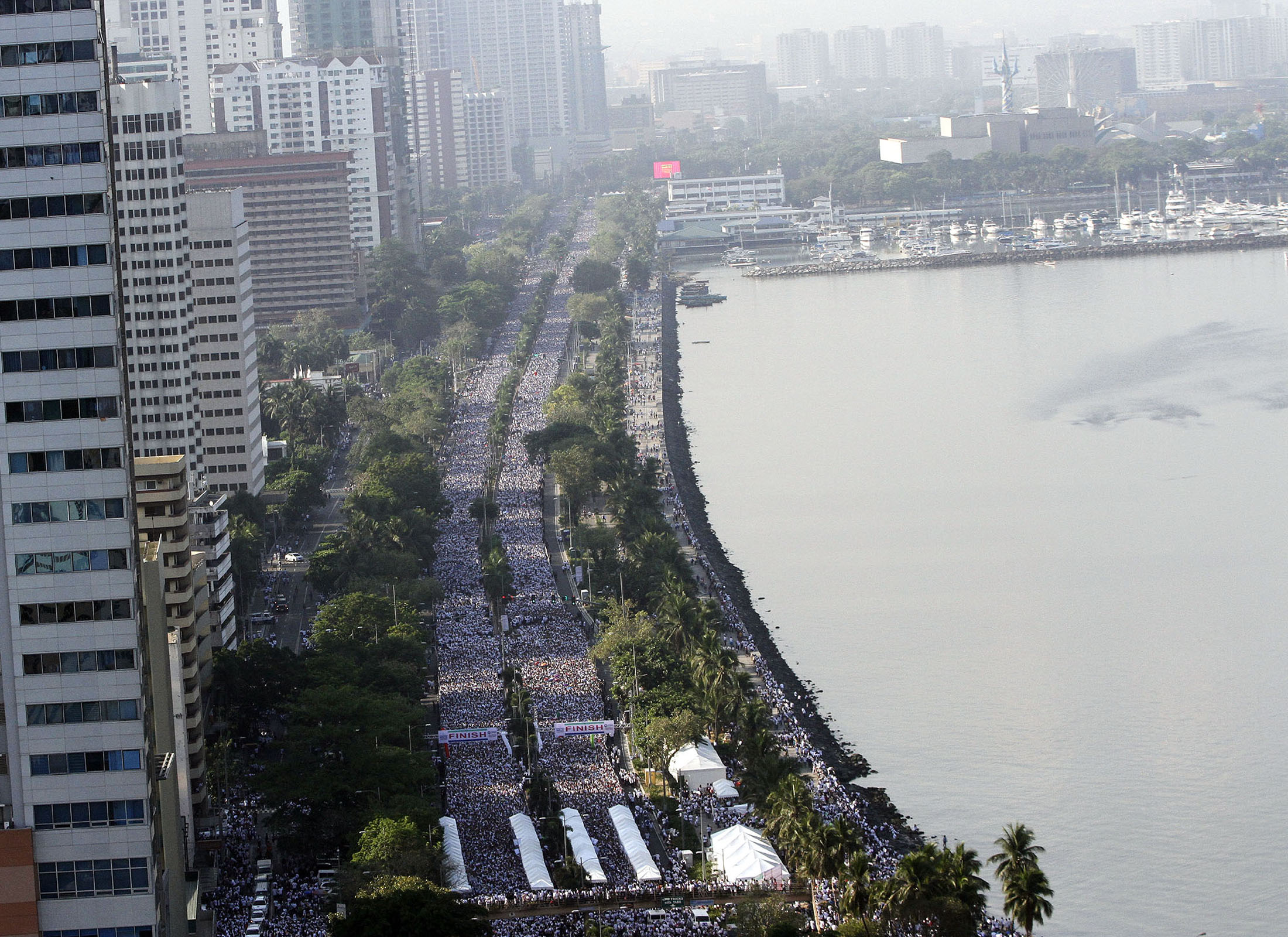
INC members participate in the charity walk, "Worldwide Walk to Fight Poverty", in Manila.

On 19 November 1981, INC launched the Lingap sa Mamamayan ("Aid To Humanity") Program. The program aims to provide relief goods, health care, and other services to the needy, especially those who are afflicted by calamities and disasters. It also provides seminars for disaster preparedness, first aid, and family planning. Other humanitarian activities such as blood donation and community clean up drives were also conducted in different parts of the world where the Iglesia ni Cristo is established.

Felix Y. Manalo (FYM) Foundation, the INC's arm in executing the Lingap sa Mamamayan and other related programs, was formally registered in the Philippines on 4 February 2011, and in the United States on 17 May 2012. The institution is also recognized in Japan, South Korea, Spain, and Russia.

INC also established the UNLAD International, Inc. Aimed to broaden the reach of the program for livelihood and to help more people, UNLAD was registered to the Philippine government on 17 March 2013.

On 7 July 2012, the INC Lingap sa Mamamayan was conducted in the slums of Parola in Tondo, Manila and was awarded three Guinness World Records for breaking records in the most people involved in a dental health check; the most blood pressure readings taken in 8 hours; and the most blood glucose level tests in 8 hours. On 29 April 2016, four more Guinness world records were broken by the INC. These records are the largest collection of clothes for recycle/donation, the most shoes donated to charity in 24 hours, the most medical ultrasound examinations in eight hours, and the most medical risk assessment in eight hours which was also held in Tondo, Manila.

On 15 February 2014, INC received another two Guinness world records when they conducted a worldwide charity walk simultaneously on 135 different sites scattered in 29 countries. INC holds the records for the largest charity walk on a single venue when 175,509 members of the church finished the 1.6 km walk in Manila; and for the largest charity walk in 24 hours (multiple venues) when a total of 519,521 participants finished the charity walk in different parts of the world. The proceeds were used for the housing and livelihood projects of super Typhoon Haiyan survivors. INC also broke the same records on 6 May 2018, for its Worldwide Walk to Fight Poverty with 283,171 people in single venue, and 773,136 people in multiple venues for its African missions and outreach.

On 22 February 2014, INC conducted another Lingap sa Mamamayan at its first resettlement project in Barrio Maligaya in Nueva Ecija. Coinciding with the barrio's 49th anniversary, INC bagged another world record after setting the record for the most hunger relief packs distributed within eight hours. A total of 302,311 hunger relief packages were given.

=== Housing and resettlement projects ===
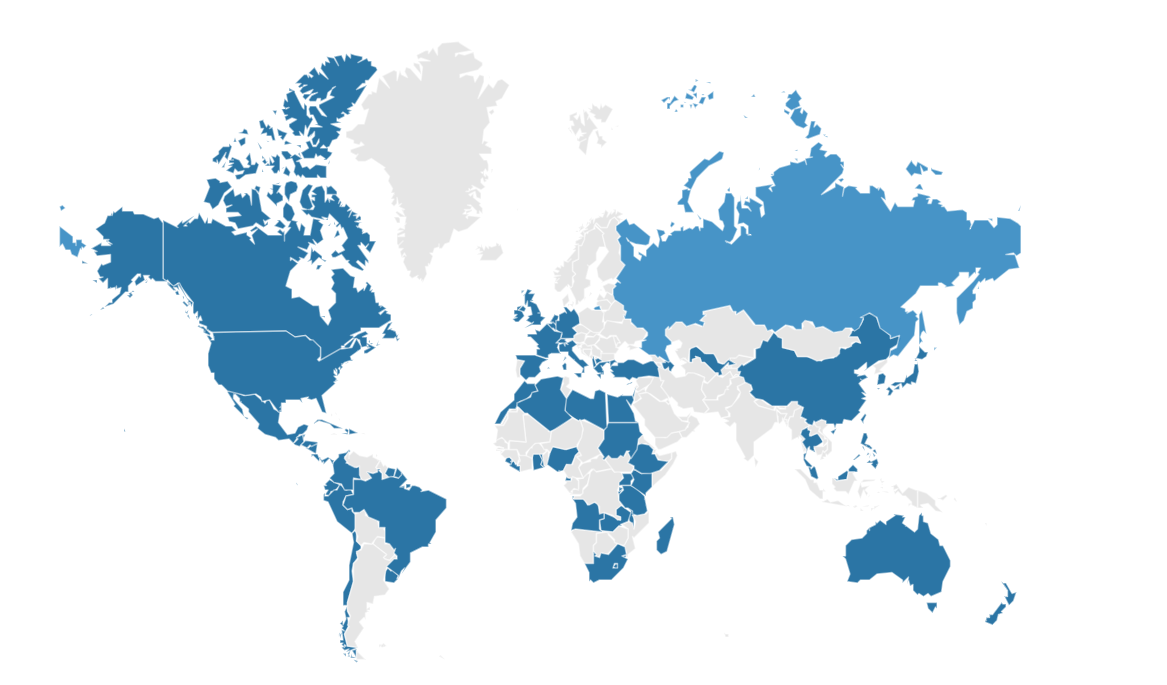
Iglesia Ni Cristo (INC) global membership reach according to the Official INC Directory. As of 2025, there are 72 sovereign nations where INC members have congregations or group worship services (GWS).

The first major housing project (pamayanan) of the INC was developed in 1965 at Barrio Maligaya in Laur, Nueva Ecija. Intended as a haven for persecuted members, Barrio Maligaya also saw the advent of an INC congregation in the area. It was also the setting of the INC film Ang Paglikas (The Exodus), which was released on the occasion of the 100th birth anniversary of Eraño Manalo in 2025. Later housing projects include Bagong Buhay in Palayan, Nueva Ecija, and Tagumpay in Rodriguez, Rizal (Montalban), which also developed INC congregations in their respective areas. Housing for INC ministers and their families were also provided for in Quezon City.

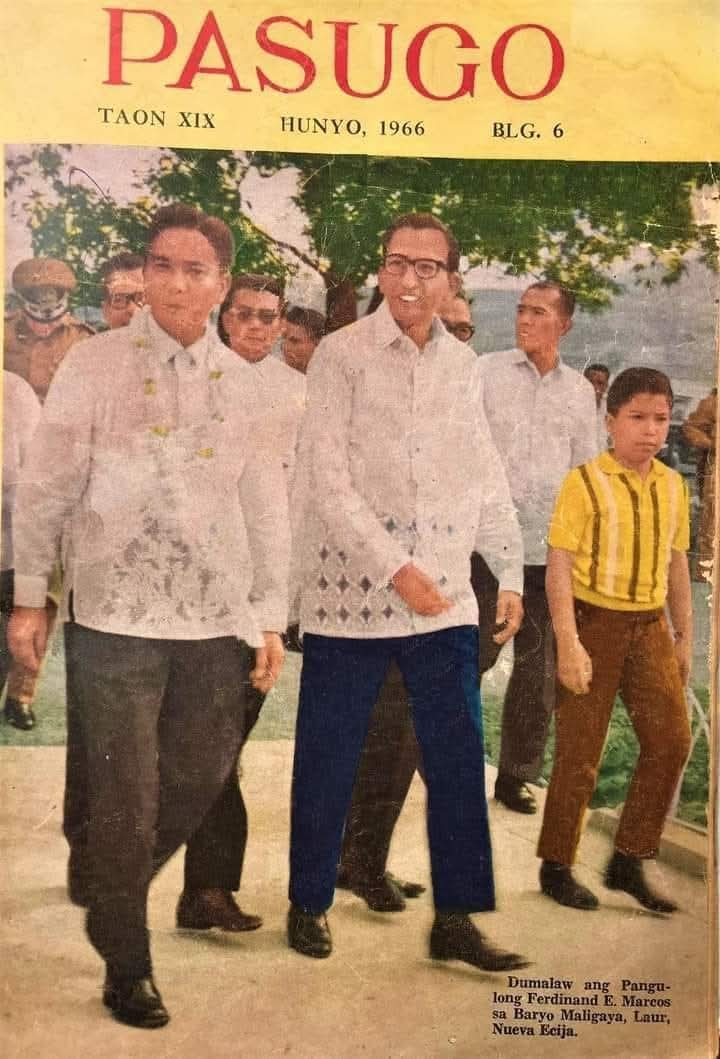
President Ferdinand Marcos with Eraño Manalo of the Iglesia ni Cristo (INC) during a presidential visit to Barrio Maligaya, Nueva Ecija.

On 14 March 2014, after conducting a worship service in Tacloban, Leyte, INC executive minister Eduardo V. Manalo, led the groundbreaking ceremony of the EVM Self-Sustainable Community Rehabilitation Project in Sitio New Era, a 3000-hectare property of the church in Brgy. Langit, Alang-alang, Leyte. The project, which costs more than one billion pesos, includes at least 1,000 housing units for the survivors of super typhoon Haiyan. Garments and dried fish factories, and eco-farming project are also included to provide livelihood to the community. More than 150,000 hunger relief packages were also given which contains 3 kilos of rice, canned goods and instant noodles aside from the free medical and dental services conducted that day. On 23 January 2015, Manalo inaugurated the livelihood and housing project.

On 9 November 2015, Manalo inaugurated a community project for Kabihug tribe, an indigenous group in Camarines Norte. The project is situated in a 100-hectare land which includes 300 housing units, calamansi orchard, ecological farm, dried fish factory, garments factory, clinic, learning center, and an INC worship building. After 6 months, another housing and eco-farming community project was inaugurated by the church on 27 May 2016, for the B'laan tribe in Bgy. Danlag, Tampakan South, South Cotabato in southern Philippines.

== Administration and organization ==
Iglesia ni Cristo Executive Ministers
Name	Tenure of office
Felix Y. Manalo	27 July 1914 – 12 April 1963 (Note: During World War II, Felix Manalo issued a circular which formalized the assumption to duty of Prudencio Vasquez as Executive Minister on 29 June 1942. Justifying the move as acquiescence to the Japanese demand at the time, Manalo would reassume the post after the war ended.)
Eraño G. Manalo	23 April 1963 – 31 August 2009
Eduardo V. Manalo	7 September 2009–present

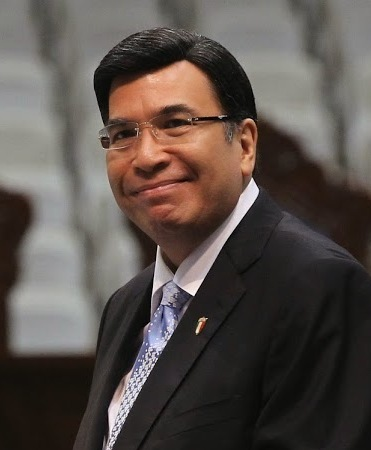
Eduardo V. Manalo, Iglesia ni Cristo's current Executive Minister, was mentioned in the Paradise Papers, a set of over 13.4 million confidential electronic documents relating to offshore investments.

Iglesia ni Cristo has had three Executive Ministers (Tagalog: Tagapamahalang Pangkalahatan) who lead the Church Administration in overseeing the faith and directing the daily lives of the church members. Eduardo V. Manalo, as the current Executive Minister, serves as the church's leader, and, in this capacity, manages the administration of the church. Along with other senior ministers which comprises the Church Economic Council (Tagalog: Lupon ng Sanggunian), the Executive Minister forms the Central Administration of Iglesia ni Cristo.

The Central Office in Quezon City, built in 1971, is Iglesia ni Cristo's headquarters. The Central Office is one of several structures inside the INC Central Office Complex. It houses the permanent offices of the central administration and some of the church's departments. It is here where about a thousand INC professionals and volunteers hold office. It was located in Manila during its early years, then in San Juan, and later in Makati, before moving to its present site. INC also has three main offices outside the Philippines; in Burlingame, California; Washington, D.C.; and in Heathrow, London. As of 2025, the INC is present in 3,222 locations across 72 nations, many of which had church edifices or houses of worship.

Demographics of the Iglesia Ni Cristo (as of 2025)
Region	Congregations	Average per ecclesiastical district	House churches, group worship services (GWS), and church extensions (Ext.)	Average per ecclesiastical district	Total (congregations and groups)	Percent share of all INC congregations
Africa	45	15	85	28.3	130	0.8%
Americas	434	12.8	192	5.6	626	7.3%
Asia	129	12.9	65	6.5	194	2.2%
Europe	99	9.9	119	11.9	218	1.6%
Oceania	98	16.3	73	12.2	171	1.6%
Philippines	5163	39.1	2181	16.5	7344	86.5%

Administration and ministerial work are delegated into ecclesiastical districts (termed divisions until 1990) which are led by District Supervising Ministers (O1, formerly division ministers or ministrong regular) and Assistant District Supervising Ministers (O2, formerly regular evangelist). They are assisted by deacons (diyakono), deaconesses (diyakonesa), secretaries (kalihim), treasurers (ingat-yaman), and workers (manggagawa). Ecclesiastical districts usually comprise 30 congregations (referred to as locales) on average, if excluding house churches, group worship services (GWS), and church extensions. All locales were directly managed by Felix Y. Manalo until 1924 when the first ecclesiastical district was organized in Pampanga.

Members are also organized into Christian Family Organizations (CFOs), which cater to groups depending on their respective life stages. Buklod (formerly Buklod ng Gintong Layunin) is for married members. KADIWA (Kabataang May Diwang Wagas, formerly Kapisanang Maligayang Pagtatagumpay) is for single members 18 years old and above. Binhi is for baptized members aged 12 to 17. Pagsamba ng Kabataan (PNK) is for members' children aged 4 to 11. There are also CFOs aimed for different settings, such as the Society of Communicators and Networkers International (SCAN). Platforms critical of the church such as the satirical page 2ph4u (also known as 2philippines4u in other social media channels) reportedly received serious attention from the SCAN for alleged "defamation and dissemination of harmful falsehoods" concerning the INC. On Facebook alone, 2ph4u has over 83,000 followers.

== Architecture ==
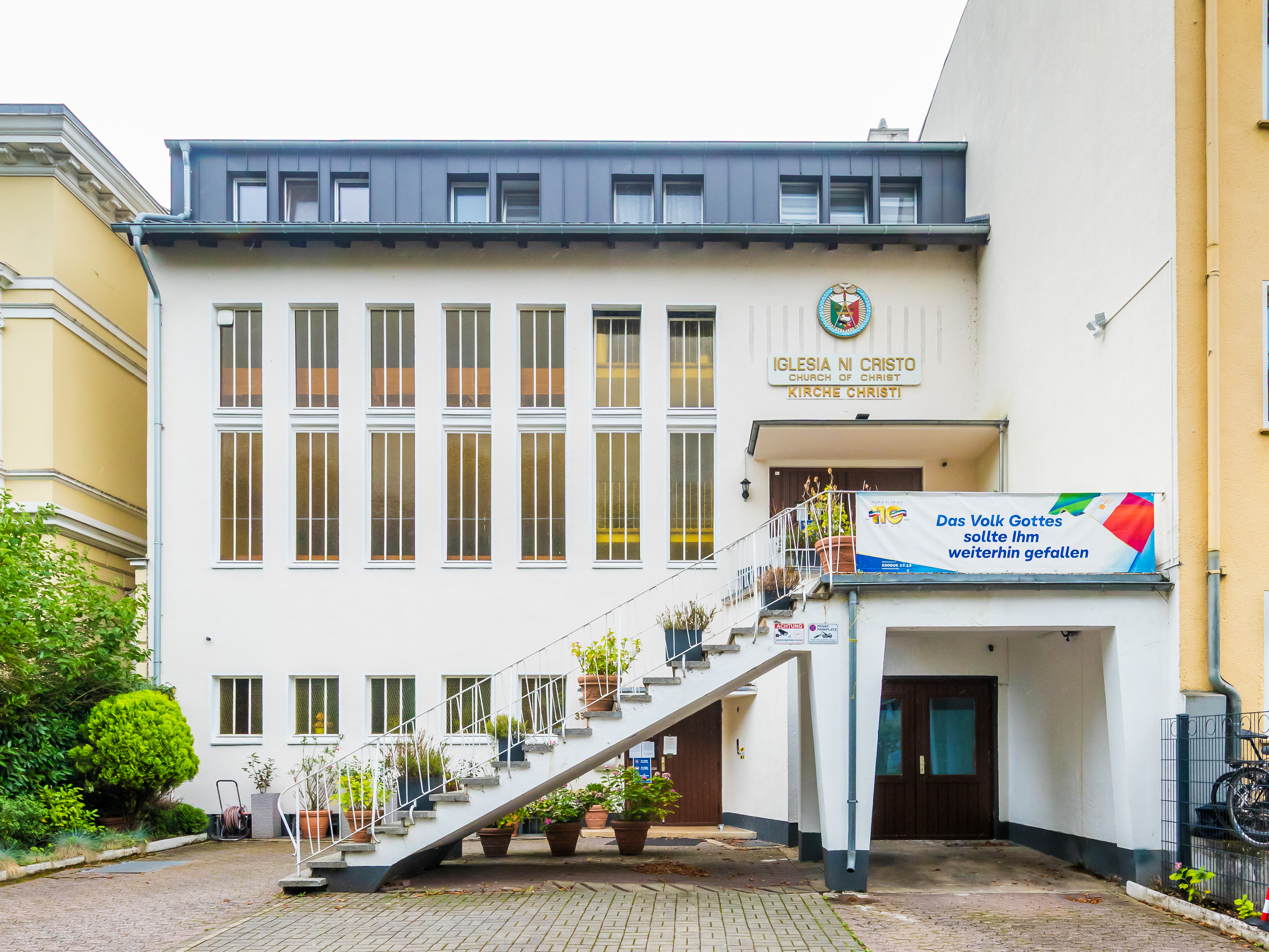
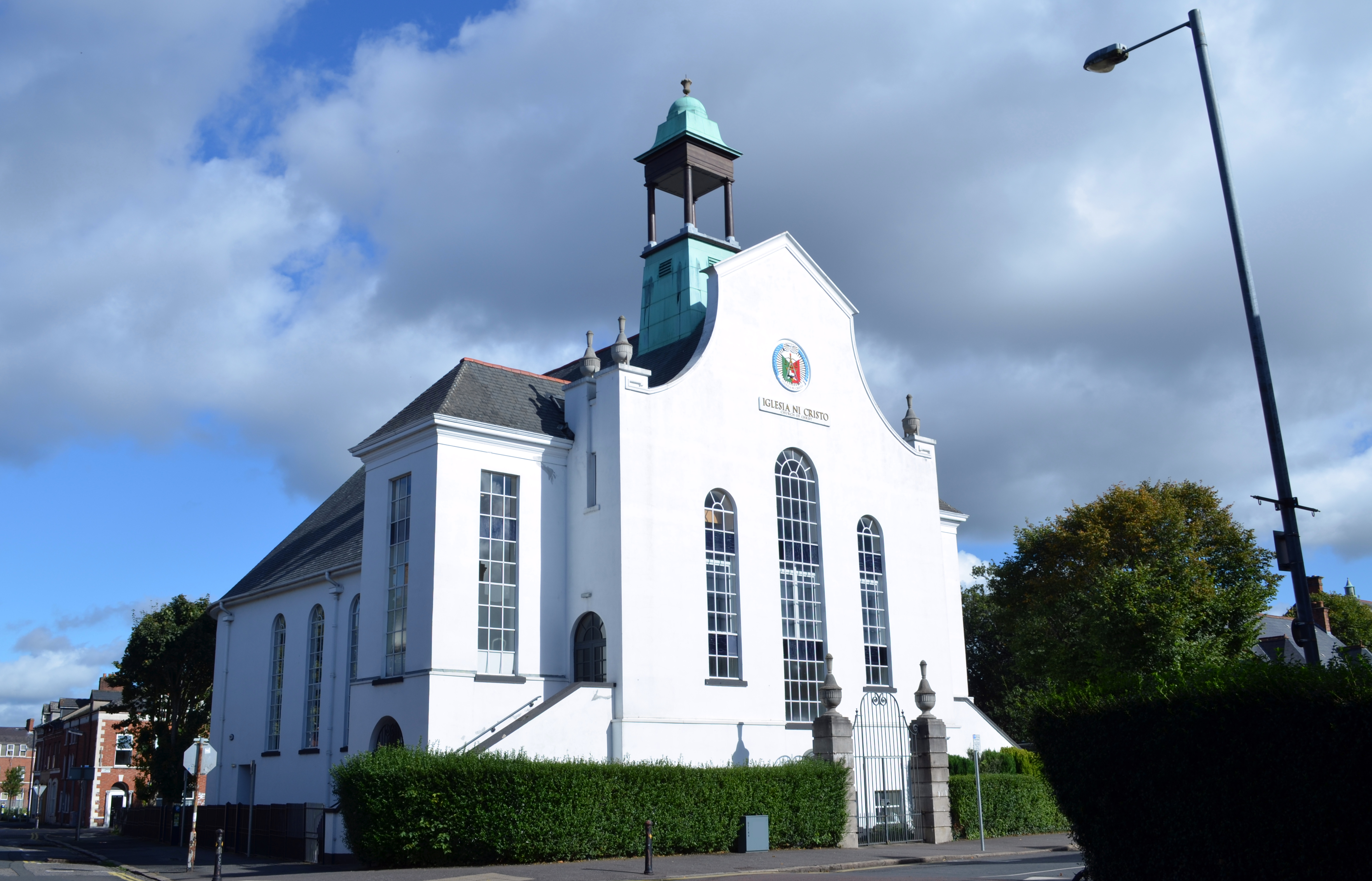
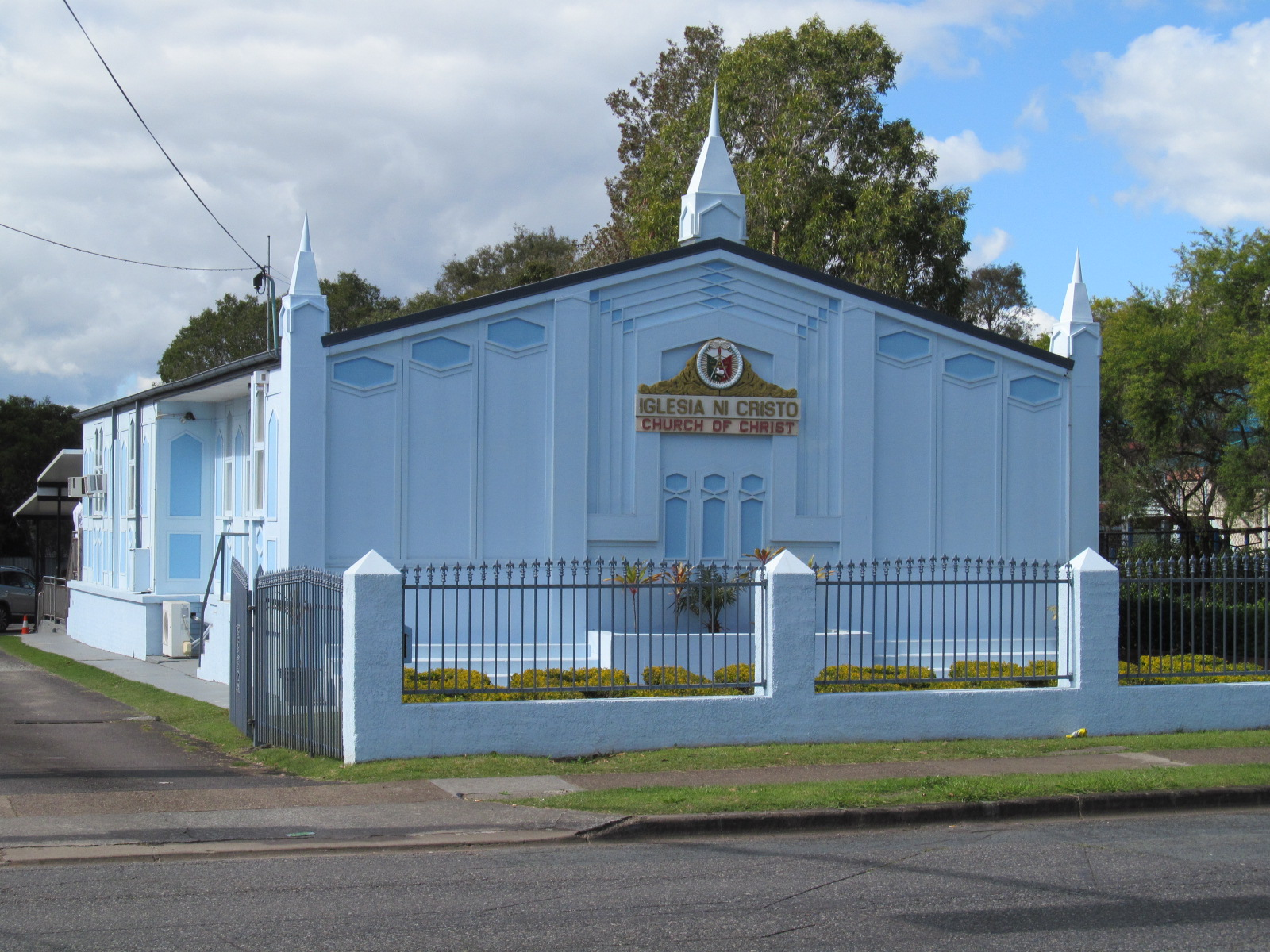
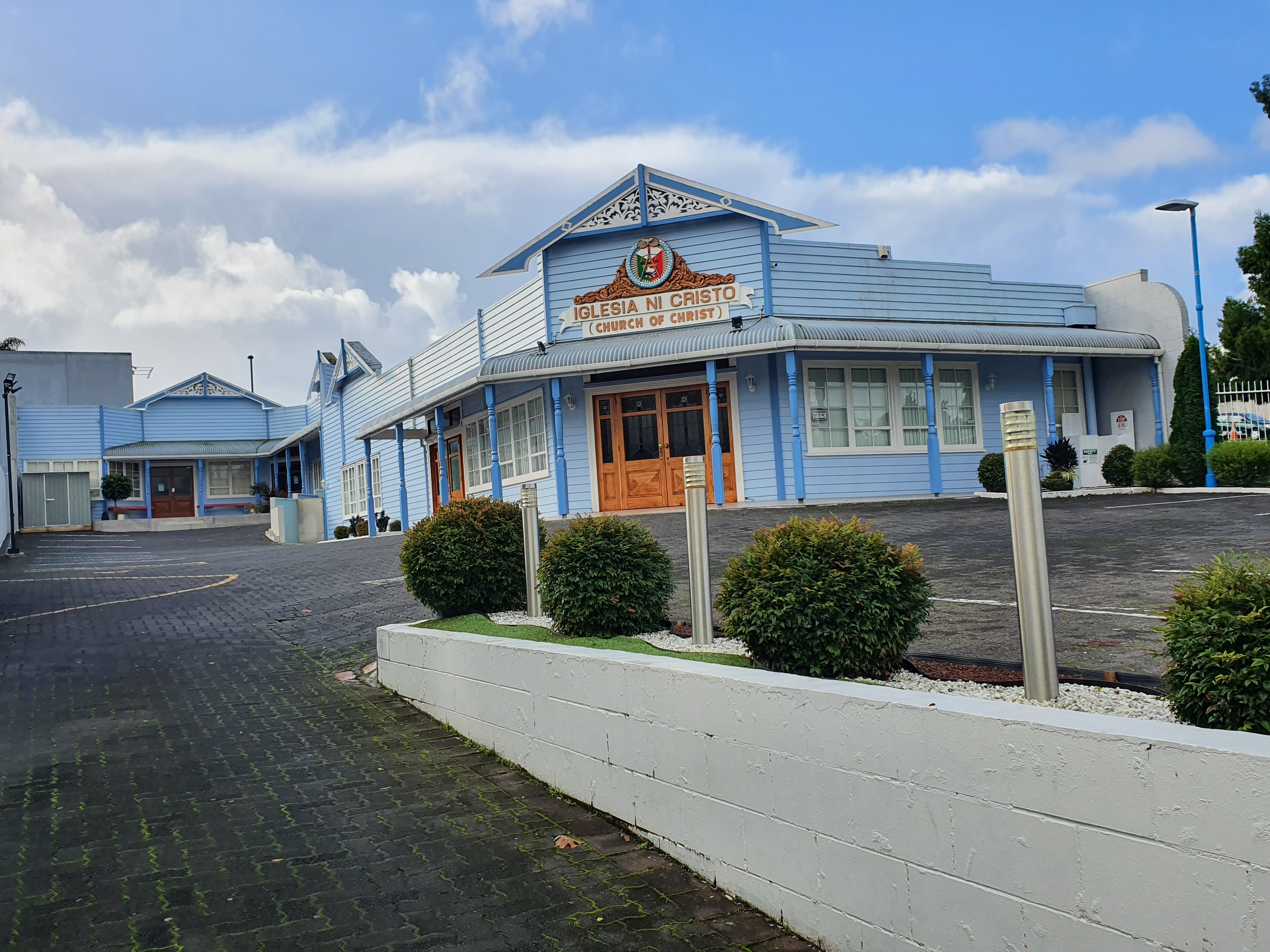
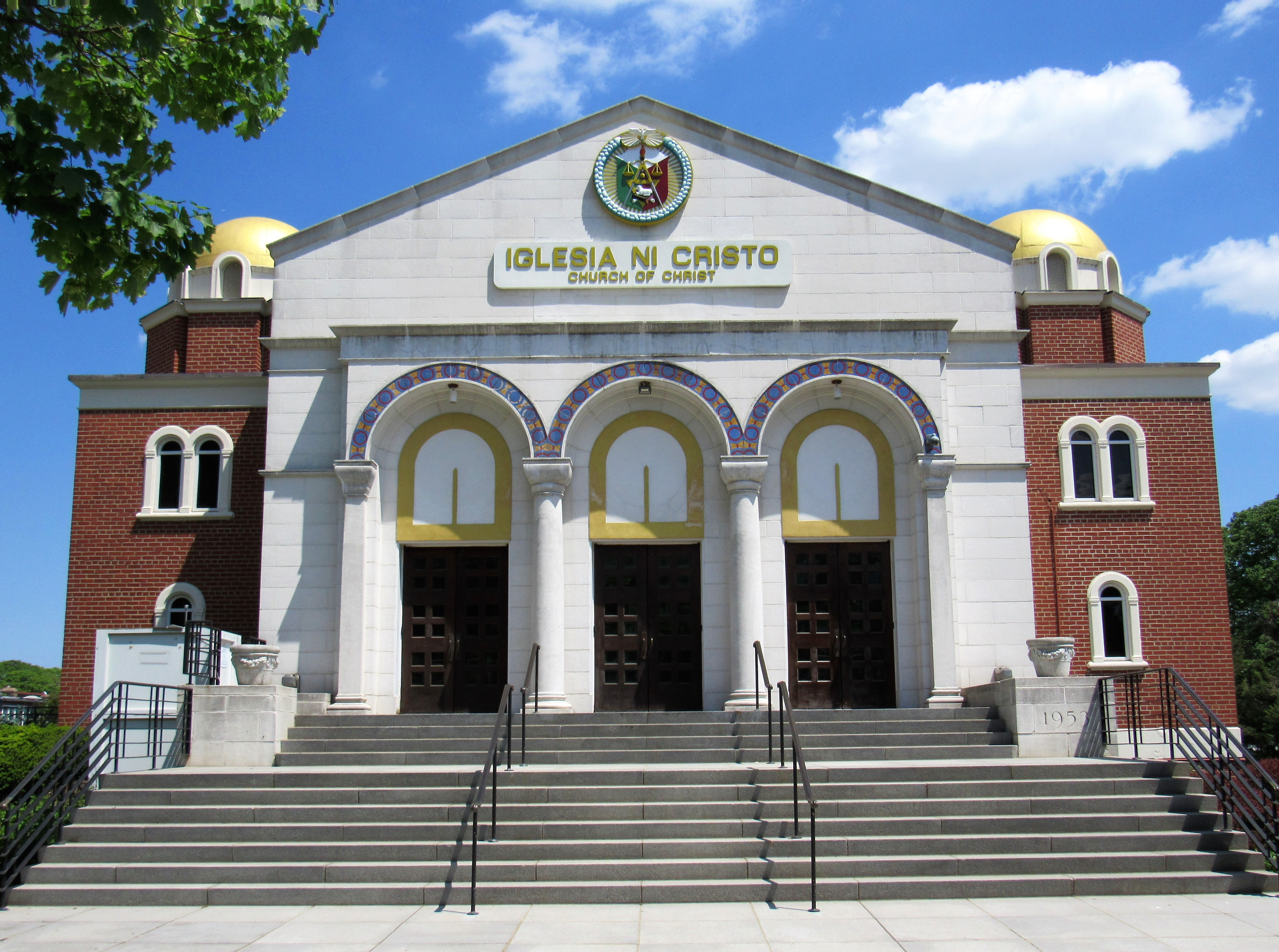
Not all INC chapels bear the trademark design of INC churches in the Philippines, such as the overseas INC congregations in Bonn, Belfast, Queensland, Glen Eden, Washington, D.C., and Memphis, Tennessee.

Iglesia ni Cristo church buildings (kapilya) primarily serve as places of worship but are also used for other religious functions. These are described by Culture and Customs of the Philippines, a book published by Greenwood Publishing Group, as structures "which employ exterior neo-Gothic vertical support columns with tall narrow windows between, interlocking trapezoids, and rosette motifs, as well as tower and spires." According to Architect Carlos A. Santos-Viola, in designing INC edifices, he had to create a style that "cannot be mistaken for any other sect except Iglesia." He also related how Manalo considered the Gothic architecture as the "most religious type of architecture" for its verticality, which was interpreted as "pointing towards heaven." There are multiple entrances leading to the main sanctuary, where males and females sit on either side of the aisle facing a dais where sermons are made. The choir loft is located behind the dais, and in larger churches, a baptistry with pools for immersion baptism is located at the back of the church. Meanwhile, Fernando Nakpil-Zialcita, an anthropologist from Ateneo de Manila University, said that INC churches can be uniquely identified for "its exuberant use of fanciful forms and ornaments [and a] brilliant white facade whose silhouette is a cusped Gothic arch or a flattened Saracenic (Muslim) arch." The distinctive spires represent "the reaching out of the faithful to God." Prominent architects, such as Juan Nakpil (a National Artist of the Philippines for architecture) and Carlos A. Santos-Viola, had been involved in designing INC churches while the Engineering and Construction Department of INC, established in 1971 and headed by Felix Manalo's youngest son Bienvenido, oversees the uniformity in design of church buildings.

The INC Central Temple, the largest single congregation of the Iglesia ni Cristo, can accommodate up to 7,000 people.

The first chapel was built on Gabriela Street in Tondo, Manila in 1918, fashioned out of sawali (woven leaf panels), nipa and wood, typified the style and materials of the early chapels. After World War II, INC began to build concrete chapels, the first of these in Washington (Maceda), Sampaloc, Manila, completed in 1948. Next came the chapel and former official residence of the executive minister in San Juan, Rizal (now San Juan City, part of Metropolitan Manila), designed by Juan Nakpil. The Central Temple, which opened on 27 July 1984, can accommodate up to 7,000 persons, and was designed by Carlos A. Santos-Viola. It features octagonal spires, "fine latticework" and ribbed windows. Recent buildings are variations on the designs of the Central Temple. These are designed to accommodate 250 to 1,000 persons while larger churches in Metro Manila and provincial capitals can accommodate up to 3,000 persons.

The church regards "decent" and "well-constructed" chapels and houses of worship as the only fitting places to conduct worship services. INC churches outside the Philippines which were acquired from different religions were converted and underwent intensive renovations to meet the standard of INC worship services.

== Political influence in the Philippines ==
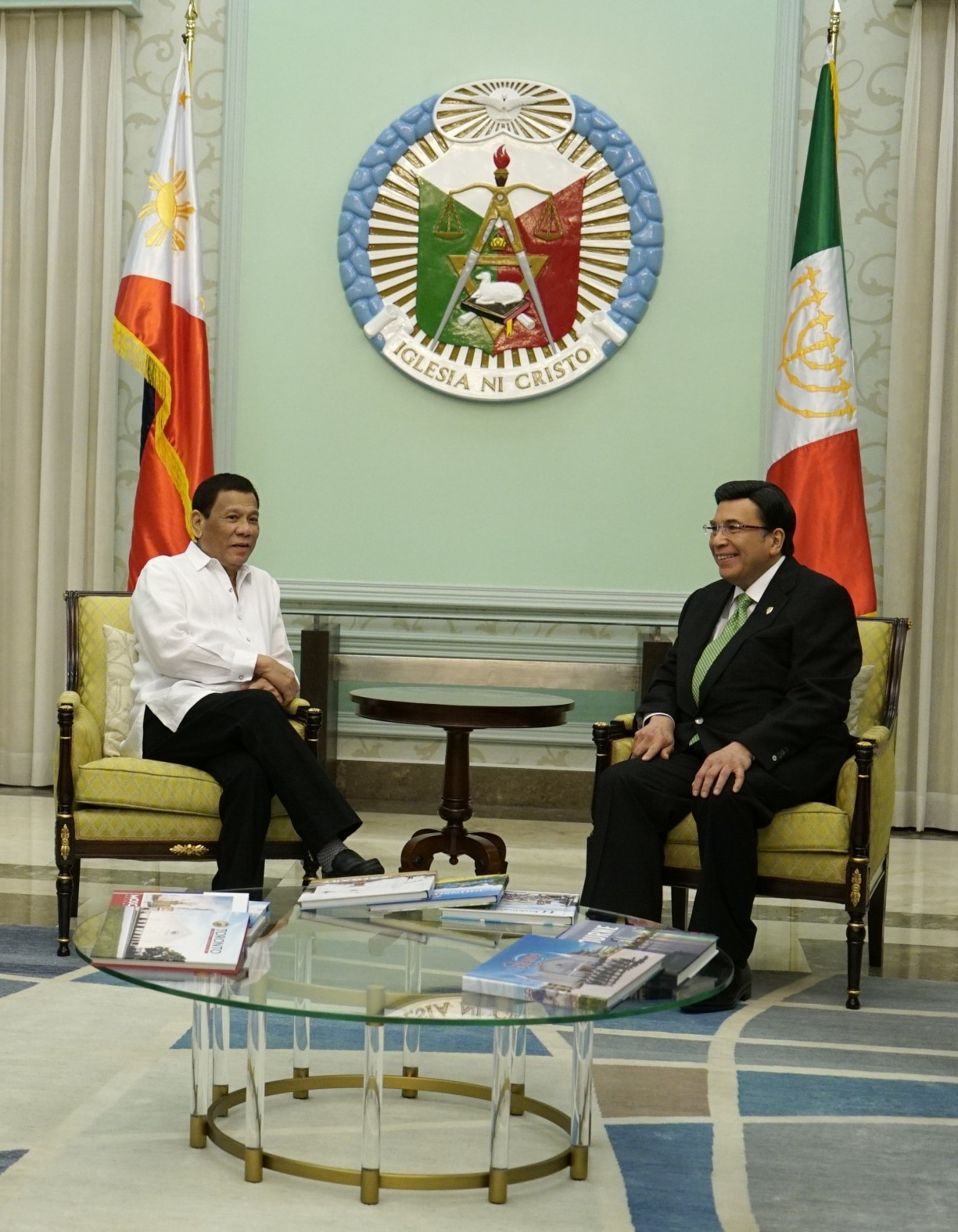
President Rodrigo Duterte meets with INC Executive Minister Eduardo V. Manalo in December 2018

The Iglesia ni Cristo is close to fundamentalist style and supports conservative politicians. Since the days of Felix Manalo at the helm, the church is known for its practice of bloc voting during elections. This so-called "Unity Vote" is justified by the INC as one of their "great powers" (dakilang kapangyarihan), explained as such in their official publication Pasugo: "Ang katangiang ito sa pagkakaisa ng Iglesia Ni Kristo ay isang lakas na hindi matutularan ng ibat-ibang relihiyon sa Pilipinas, bagama't iyan ang sa ngayo'y pinagsisikapang magawa ng Iglesia Katolika at iba pang mga relihiyon." (This characteristic of unity of the Iglesia ni Kristo is a strength that could not be emulated by the different religions in the Philippines, despite this being the current aim of the Catholic Church and other religions).

During the 2016 presidential election, INC communities in Agusan del Sur, Nueva Ecija, Rizal, Dasmariñas, and Quezon City delivered 98% to 100% of the total votes to the endorsed candidates. The church supported the candidacy of Benigno "Noynoy" Aquino III during the 2010 presidential elections, and also voted for Rodrigo Duterte in the 2016 presidential elections. In the 2022 elections, Iglesia ni Cristo endorsed the candidacies of Bongbong Marcos and Sara Duterte for president and vice president respectively. In the 2025 senatorial elections, the church supported the senatorial candidacy of INC member Rodante Marcoleta.

In the 1935 Philippine presidential election, Senate President Manuel L. Quezon reportedly cultivated the support of the INC, to the point of calling Felix Manalo a bishop (whereas there is no such title in the INC hierarchy). (Note: Even as a Protestant, Manalo was never ordained as a bishop during his lifetime.) While still a faithful member of the Catholic Church (Note: Quezon "resigned" from the Masonry on 18 August 1930.), Quezon's courage to stand up to the predominant religious institution in the Philippines earned him points to Manalo and his church, which as of 1936 had reported having 85,000 members across 500 congregations, all of which were in Luzon at the time.

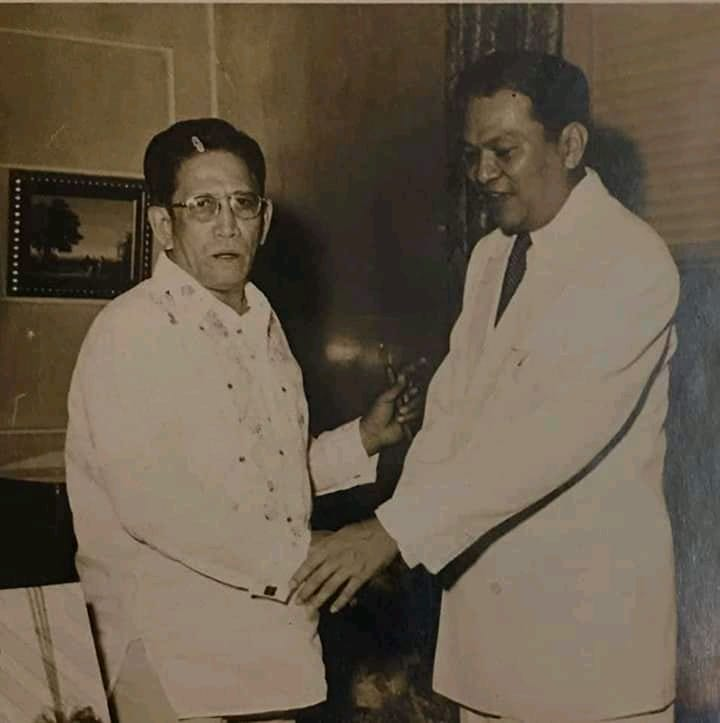
President Ramon Magsaysay with Felix Manalo of the INC holding a cigar. Manalo initially supported Magsaysay, then criticized the president for the latter's perceived Catholicism.

In the 1961 Philippine presidential election, the INC opposed the campaign of Diosdado Macapagal, who would eventually win the polls and make him the first Filipino vice president to defeat an incumbent president. At this time, the INC is seen by the media as "the bogey of Philippine politics." For the vice presidency, the INC supported the Independent candidate Sergio Osmeña, Jr., who lost to Macapagal's running mate Emmanuel Pelaez, in a three-way race that saw Osmeña taking second place with nearly 2.2 million votes. According to Filipino journalist and publisher Max Soliven, more moderate estimates of the bloc voting power of the "militant and politically-minded" INC at the time totaled to 250,000 votes, contrary to Felix Manalo's claim of having 850,000 members.

In the 1965 Philippine presidential election, support from Eraño Manalo and the INC was one of the attributed reasons behind the victory of Ferdinand Marcos over the incumbent Macapagal.

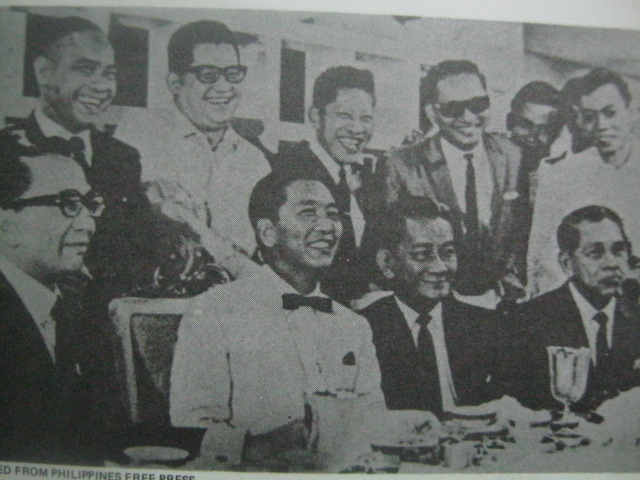
President Ferdinand Marcos and some Philippine senators (namely Sergio Osmeña, Jr., Arturo Tolentino, Ninoy Aquino, and Jose Roy) during a birthday celebration of Executive Minister Eraño Manalo

In the 1969 Philippine vice presidential election, the INC supported the losing bid of Genaro Magsaysay, running mate of presidential candidate Sergio Osmeña, Jr., in a split ticket (that is, Marcos-Magsaysay) (Note: In his diary, President Ferdinand Marcos remarked that while "Iglesia support had certainly helped turn the tide," the church was also "a sly and cunning lot." Since the INC had historically supported Osmeña, Marcos personally doubted the last-minute shift of support of the INC.). Incumbent Vice President Fernando Lopez, the first Filipino to be elected to the vice presidency thrice and later Chairman of ABS-CBN Corporation, believed he has "debunked Iglesia political power with the help of responsible voters." In victory, Lopez remarked that he would rather lose the election than "surrender" to the INC. Lopez (with 62.7 percent vote share) also polled higher than his running mate, President Ferdinand Marcos (with 62.2 percent vote share).

On 23 September 1972, when President Ferdinand Marcos announced placing Martial law in the Philippines, MetroCom troops led by General Fidel Ramos stormed the INC Central Office to close down the church's media arm Eagle Broadcasting Corporation. However, having no orders from the Executive Minister to allow government forces to enter in their compound, the INC guards armed with Thompson submachine guns opened fire to defend the place, and killed one Philippine Constabulary in the process. (Note: In his diary, President Ferdinand Marcos noted that two members of the Philippine Constabulary were killed, and three Marines were wounded. Marcos met with Eraño Manalo on 14 October 1972. According to Marcos, Manalo was "worried that he may be picked up" and that his accounts were to be examined by the Bureau of Internal Revenue.) By the time Defense Minister Juan Ponce Enrile arrived in the area, MetroCom troops have already retaliated to the church defiance and killed at least 12 INC guards. After discussions with the church administration, government forces were successful in shutting down the INC media. Enrile called the battle as "the only violent incident" of the day, while Media Czar Primitivo Mijares dubbed it as the "only armed resistance to the military efforts to enforce martial law."

In the 1986 Philippine presidential election, while the church administration supported the reelection bid of President Ferdinand Marcos, Filipino investigative journalist Malou Mangahas wrote that the decision "came close to seriously dividing its flock" as errant members voted for the opposition candidate Corazon Aquino. This prompted a house-to-house campaign by INC ministers to determine who voted against the church administration's choice (tagubilin). However, instead of being used as grounds for expulsion (tiwalag), erring members were instead compelled to write their explanations (salaysay).

A rally against inflation, particularly the rising prices of petroleum, was scheduled by the INC on 22 July 1991. Days before the event, the rally was called off. While the church administration claimed there was "no political agenda" in the planned rally, later recollections of the aborted rally would postulate that the government of President Corazon Aquino was allegedly "threatened" by the prospect of having 2 million INC members joining the demonstrations. According to the 1990 Philippine census, adherents of the INC at the time were around 1.4 million.

From 25 April to 1 May 2001, the INC formed the backbone of protesters who joined EDSA III, which supported the cause of Former President Joseph Estrada.

On 12 June 2009, President Gloria Macapagal Arroyo signed Republic Act No. 9645, declaring 27 July as "Iglesia ni Cristo Day", a special national working holiday. On 13 February 2018, President Rodrigo Duterte appointed INC's executive minister, Eduardo Manalo, as special envoy for overseas Filipino concerns. Manalo was again reappointed by President Bongbong Marcos as Special Envoy for Overseas Filipino Concerns; Manalo's tenure lasted from 2 September 2023, to 1 September 2024. On 31 October 2024, President Bongbong Marcos issued Proclamation No. 729, declaring 27 July 2025, as "Iglesia ni Cristo Day," a special non-working holiday.

On 28 February 2012, some 600,000 INC members gathered for a "prayer rally" and "Grand Evangelical Mission" at the Quirino Grandstand and 19 other sites. While claimed to be part of the church's campaign to "propagate God's words", it was also perceived as a show of force against the Impeachment of Renato Corona, who was then Chief Justice of the Philippines. Corona himself, while invited to the event, did not accept the invitation to avoid being accused of "being there for a political purpose."

The 2015 INC protests were a series of marches which occurred between 27–31 August 2015. Supporters of the Iglesia ni Cristo protested against the Department of Justice for allegedly meddling in internal church affairs by taking action on an illegal detention case filed by expelled minister Isaias Samson, Jr. Samson alleged that officials of the church's governing body, the Sanggunian, placed him and his family under house arrest, and accused the church of corruption. Some 20,000 INC members reportedly participated in the protests.

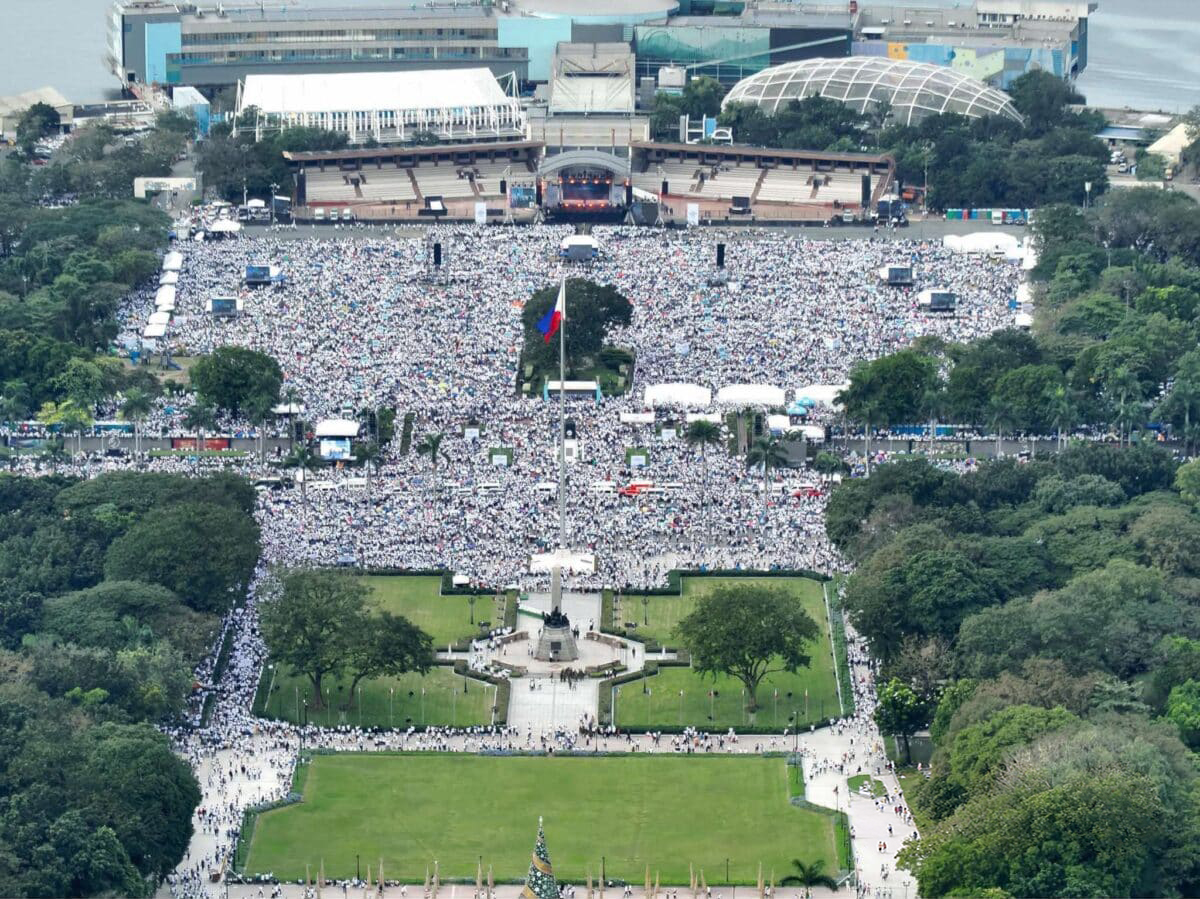
A peak number of over a million people reportedly participated at the main activities of the National Rally for Peace at the Quirino Grandstand in Manila, a count that included non-INC members.

The INC on 4 December 2024, has announced that it plans to hold a rally to oppose the impeachment efforts concurring with President Marcos' stance in November 2024 that efforts to remove Vice President Sara Duterte from office is unconstructive. On 13 January 2025, more than 1.5 million INC members went to the "National Rally for Peace" at the Quirino Grandstand in Manila; 12 other sites also staged the rally across the country. In the lead-up to the National Rally for Peace, Filipino Pulitzer Prize–winning journalist Manuel Mogato observed that "INC's threat should not matter. The political landscape has changed. INC's political endorsement is a myth." Moreover, Mogato noted that despite their attempts at political maneuvering throughout their church history, "INC chooses to endorse not based on moral values or the character of a candidate based on INC's religious beliefs. INC would endorse a candidate based on his or her chances of winning."

From 16 to 18 November 2025, the INC planned to hold the "Peaceful Rally for Transparency" with the theme Transparency for a Better Democracy along EDSA, with the demonstrations centering at the People Power Monument, and Rizal Park (Luneta). A turnout of 300,000 rallyists per day were expected. The INC Rally for Transparency and a Better Democracy eventually centered its efforts at the Quirino Grandstand in Manila, reaching a peak attendance of 650,000 on the first day (16 November) before settling to around 120,000 at the start of the second day (17 November). The INC prematurely ended the rally on the second day, citing that the people were "tired" and "exhausted," while justifying the early end of the protests with the supposed achievement of its goals of calling for "justice, accountability, transparency, and peace." There were concerns that the INC rally in November 2025 was a destabilization campaign at heart, prompting the deployment of over 16,000 police officers (compared to the 5,000 police officers deployed for the earlier National Rally for Peace in January 2025). Some INC members, however, regarded the rally more as a vacation than a call to action with INC members taking their time off from work and/or school to participate in their church undertaking. The Manila City Local Government Unit (LGU) spearheaded and conducted clean-up efforts after the INC rally. The Kingdom of Jesus Christ (KOJC) of Pastor Apollo Quiboloy issued a statement that its in solidarity with the INC's rally.

Fron June 30 to July 2, 2026, an estimated peak of 15,000 rallyists, most of which are members of the INC, crowded the People Power Monument for an "emergency rally" to call for "true justice to prevail." Initially gathered without corresponding demonstration permits from the Philippine government, the turnout was lower than the 100,000 people expected by the church to participate. The rally eventually moved to and ended at Liwasang Bonifacio. The crowd reportedly peaked at around 8,200 people during its last day.

=== 2015 Iglesia ni Cristo leadership controversy ===
A dispute between senior members of the INC in the Philippines occurred in July 2015. It was reported that the INC had expelled some of its ministers, along with high-profile members Felix Nathaniel "Angel" Manalo and Cristina "Tenny" Villanueva Manalo, the brother and mother of current INC Executive Minister Eduardo Manalo, respectively.

The INC administration released a statement claiming that Eduardo had agreed to the expulsion of his brother and mother from the INC, as decided upon by its overall leadership. Angel and Tenny had reportedly been illegally detained at the Iglesia's Central Office Complex in Tandang Sora, Quezon City, and that at least ten ministers of the Church were missing and alleged to have been abducted.

Former INC ministers Roel Rosal and Isaias Samson, Jr., claimed that the Sanggunián (the highest administrative council of the INC) had unlawfully abducted and detained ministers, along with members of the Manalo family, to cover up corruption surrounding the chief auditor, Glicerio "Jun" Santos, Jr. On 24 July 2015, the INC, represented by Glicerio B. Santos IV, head counsel and son of Santos, Jr., filed a libel complaint against Samson. Detained INC Evangelical Worker Lowell Menorca stated that he was forcibly detained by the INC administration, and was kidnapped at gunpoint by police officers in the employ of INC leaders and was forced to deny his captivity under duress. Menorca later fled to Canada and filed for refugee status, which was granted in 2018, with the Immigration and Refugee Board of Canada stating: "When the panel considers the links between the INC and the law enforcement authorities in the Philippines, the general climate of impunity that pervades Philippines law enforcement, particularly with respect to the issue of extrajudicial killing, and the level of corruption that exists in the Philippines government and law enforcement apparatus, the panel is satisfied Menorca would be unable to avail himself of state protection, from the risks that he fears in that country..."

=== Political endorsements ===
The Iglesia ni Cristo is known for its political endorsements every election season in the Philippines. The church has previously endorsed the presidential candidacies of the dictator Ferdinand Marcos, who was ousted by the first People Power revolution and escaped to the United States amid corruption scandals, Joseph Estrada, who was ousted by the second People Power revolution and arrested for plunder, Gloria Macapagal-Arroyo, who was arrested for plunder, Rodrigo Duterte, who was arrested for crimes against humanity by the International Criminal Court, and Bongbong Marcos. It has endorsed the vice presidential candidacy of Sara Duterte, who has been impeached twice. The church has previously endorsed the re-election bids of senators Jinggoy Estrada, who has been arrested thrice for plunder, Bong Revilla, who has been arrested twice for plunder, and fellow INC member Rodante Marcoleta, who has been arrested for plunder. It has also endorsed the mayorship of Alice Guo (Guo Hua Ping), a Chinese spy and convicted human trafficker linked to the controversial Philippine Offshore Gaming Operators (POGOs) scandal.

== Felix Y. Manalo Foundation ==
The Felix Y. Manalo (FYM) Foundation is the humanitarian outreach arm of the Iglesia ni Cristo (INC) church. It manages INC's international aid programs providing free medical and dental clinics, educational assistance, disaster relief and other essential goods to needy communities.

In August 2022, the FYM Foundation, in partnership with Iglesia ni Cristo congregations in Canada, distributed 2,000 grocery bags and donated funds to local charities during a Care for Humanity event in Red Deer. In 2022, FYM Foundation received the 2021 Presidential Award for Filipino Individuals and Organizations Overseas (PAFIOO) under the "Banaag" category.

== Reception from other religions and denominations ==
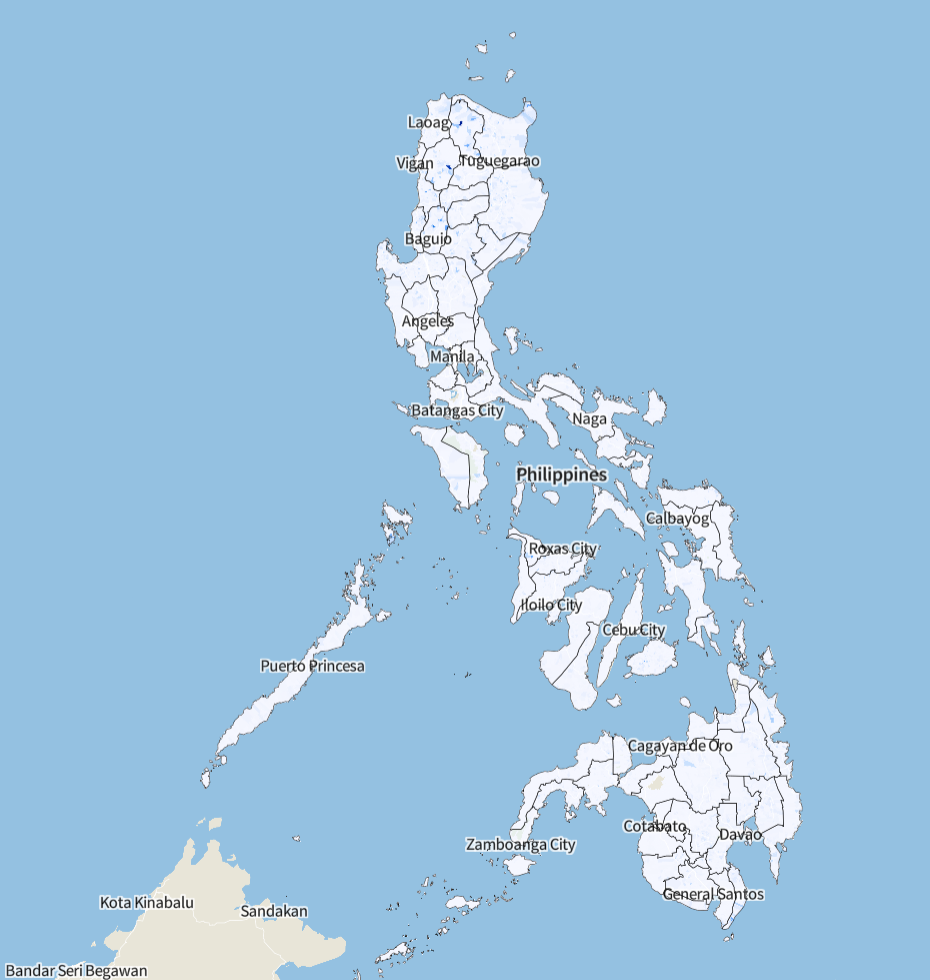
Concentration of Iglesia Ni Cristo members in the Philippines according to the 2020 Philippine Census per barangay level. Barangay New Era in Quezon City where the INC Central Temple is located has a Muslim majority (53.2 percent of the barangay population adhere to Islam, compared to 32.9 percent adhering to INC). Meanwhile, the barangay where the church's second oldest congregation Iglesia ni Cristo chapel, Tondo is located in Manila has a Catholic majority (95.1 percent adhering to Catholicism, compared to 2.1 percent adhering to INC).

Hukbalahap leader and democratic Christian socialist Luis Taruc wrote in his book Born of the People (1949 and 1953) that during World War II, Filipino landlords and the Japanese used members of the INC as civilian guards, with signs labeled as I am Iglesia seen as guarantee of protection.

Joseph Kavanagh of the Jesuits, a teacher at the San Jose Seminary, observed in 1955 that many of the doctrinal attacks of the INC, particularly against the Catholic Church, were unoriginal and had been answered before. He also noted that Manalo's anti-Catholicism essentially makes him a Protestant, and the church doctrines were more of a "potpourri of borrowings from several different creeds, the fruit, undoubtedly, of Mr. Manalo's spiritual wanderings."

Since 1980, there have been conflicts between the INC and the Members Church of God International (MCGI), when MCGI Overall Servant Eliseo Soriano started his radio program Ang Dating Daan (ADD). Through his program, he discussed biblical issues and "exposed" what he believes to be wrong doctrines of other religious groups, including those of INC. In 2001, after 20 years of reticence, the INC launched its own program, Ang Tamang Daan, then hosted by INC Ministers Maximo Bularan, Michael Sandoval, and Ramil Parba, as a direct response for the first time to Ang Dating Daan, featuring video footages and recordings of ADD hosts (besides Soriano himself, this roster included Josel Mallari and Willy Santiago) as issues were tackled and their format likened to a "running debate." Over time, the animosity between the two groups has intensified and the relationship has been severely strained.

In 1983, Christian Reformed Church in North America minister Johan D. Tangelder called the INC a pseudo-Christian or quasi-Christian sect. He also noted the "regimented lifestyle" and the "authoritarian organization" of the INC.

Karl Keating, the founder of Catholic Answers, said in 1990 that the INC engages in anti-Catholicism and anti-Protestantism in its God's Message magazine. Keating views the church as being built on a set of anti-Catholic doctrines, and that their lessons, as well as their God's Message magazine are dedicated more to debunking Catholic and Protestant beliefs and doctrines than to explaining their own positions.

In 1992, the Movie and Television Review and Classification Board (MTRCB) gave an X rating to the church's television program of the same name, Ang Iglesia ni Cristo, for "criticizing different religions, based on their own interpretation of the Bible." (Note: Particularly cited were attacks of the INC against the Veneration of Mary, and the celebration of Christmas.) The MTRCB also recommended for the program to "delve on explaining their own faith and beliefs and avoid attacks on other faith." Banking on the principle of freedom of religion, the INC appealed the case to the Court of Appeals in 1995, which affirmed the MTRCB's actions, and to the Supreme Court in 1996, which reversed the appellate court's decision. The principle applied in this particular case was also cited in a 2005 case between the MTRCB and Filipino media company ABS-CBN.

Let Us Reason Ministries, an online apologetics research group, has challenged the Iglesia ni Cristo's doctrines that one can only receive salvation if they are a member of the INC, and for saying that the INC has the sole authority from God to interpret and preach the Bible, while other religions do not. They also say that the Iglesia ni Cristo fallaciously misinterprets Biblical passages to suit their doctrines.

Ibn Majah, a former INC member who converted to Islam, observed in 2006 that the monotheistic view of the INC "served as a bridge for him to embrace Islam." He also compared his conversion to Islam as "much better" than his experience with the INC. He also commended the Muslim commitment to prayer, which he professed he has not found in the INC.

In his Annual Report in 2016, Adventist Executive Secretary G. T. Ng referred to the INC as a possible source of lessons for the Seventh-day Adventist Church on how to nurture their members. In particular, Ng remarked how the INC considers membership care seriously. Ng also said, "When members come to church, they report their presence. After the service is over, elders and deacons take note of the names of the absentees and visit each one in the afternoon."

James White, of Alpha and Omega ministries, challenged the theology of the Iglesia ni Cristo in a public debate. White and Jose Ventilacion of the Iglesia ni Cristo met for a debate on 21 April 2017, in Rapid City, South Dakota. White also dispelled later rumors that he was converted into an INC member, saying that it was the INC being in "damage control mode."

Dr. Yuchen Ma of Peking University classified the INC as a new religious movement (NRM), but has emphasized that although the INC claims to be the one true church, their doctrines and practices were clearly influenced by both Philippine Catholic and American Protestant traditions. A unique distinction of the INC was the Manalo claim of being the "last messenger of God." However, Ma also noted that despite having this doctrine, the INC "has experienced two changes in religious leadership within the Manalo family."

Christian platform Apologetics Index pointed out "unbiblical beliefs" of the INC, including opposition to the Trinity, inconsistency with how a creature (which Jesus is claimed to be by the INC) can be worshipped, good works and obedience to the church administration will bring salvation, the fulfillment of prophecy through Manalo, and soul sleep.

Kyle Butt, D.Min. of Apologetics Press commended the growth, the beautiful buildings, and the zealousness for evangelism of the INC. However, it was also observed that the church "veered from Christ's teachings." He also noted inconsistencies with the church doctrine, particularly with how the Bible is interpreted, and how Jesus can be worshipped despite not being divine for INC members.

A number of former INC members who have left or have been expelled from the church have since formed groups and communities. One of the significant online communities supporting former members would be the Subreddit ex-Iglesia Ni Cristo (r/exIglesiaNiCristo) which has over 50,000 members (or "apostates" as the group calls themselves), more than 3,000 contributions a week, and 1.7 million views a month (on average). While mainly composed of former members, as their name implies, their community which began in 2016 is also open to people of various religious backgrounds, including current INC members. Among the more known INC members who left the church are actresses Kathryn Bernardo, Yasmien Kurdi, and Janice de Belen.

Christ's Commission Fellowship (CCF) member Yvette Espiritu shared in a 2016 testimony how she left the INC despite her family having positions in the church, and how her life changed with CCF as she "experienced a loving God." Espiritu also professed that she has never opened the Bible as an INC member since it was discouraged by the church. According to her, the INC cultivated fear in members like her by instilling the concept of an angry and transactional God who punishes disobedience.

In 2019, Mormon apologist Edward K. Watson criticized the "juvenile level" and "outright lying" of INC doctrine, which taught that Jesus Christ and the Holy Spirit are not considered God, although the church itself was supposed to be called the "Church of Christ", and the "effortless" switching of Bible translations to support their ideology. He also labeled INC members as "mindless zombies" since the church dictated who to vote, imposed public shunning and humiliation of disciplined or former members, and discouraged its members from conducting independent Bible study. Despite the INC harping the term "magsuri" or analyze/research during its evangelism campaigns, Watson shared how bullying and intimidation became the tactic for INC ministers and members against those who do try to analyze or research their beliefs and values. Notwithstanding the controlling nature of the church and its violation of basic human rights, Watson observed that the INC is particularly successful among Filipinos (but a failure among non-Filipinos) because "it satisfied the Filipino need for cultural pride and their desire for social harmony." According to him, INC members like hearing that they are "special and better than the rest." However, he also noted that financial stability is the top concern of all INC families, making it difficult for them to leave the church, especially those who rely on church subsidies for daily living and economic security, such as INC ministers themselves.

In 2021, The Bereans Apologetics Research Ministry outright observed that "the Iglesia Ni Cristo is not a Christian church but a religious organization that continues to attack Christianity's fundamentals, most notably the divinity of the Lord Jesus Christ and salvation doctrine." It also regarded the church as a "cult" confused with the meaning of religion which presented the following contradiction: while it rejects the deity of Christ, the INC official publication Pasugo contained frequent quotations from Trinitarian theologians and scholars. To witness to INC members, The Bereans Apologetics Research Ministry suggested various approaches such as using the context of the Bible verses being cited to avoid misquotations, providing questions that require critical thinking, and avoiding trivial or peripheral beliefs which do not contribute to learning the core values of Christianity.

A book-length Catholic treatment of INC history and teachings is: Elesterio, Fernando, The Iglesia Ni Kristo: Its Christology and Ecclesiology, Quezon City, Philippines: Cardinal Bea Studies, Cardinal Bea Institute, Loyola School of Theology, Ateneo de Manila University, 1976.

== See also ==
- Ciudad de Victoria
- Christian Era Broadcasting Service International
- Eagle Broadcasting Corporation
- DZEM
- DZCE-TV
- DZEC-TV
- Net 25
