= Arámbulo =

Arámbulo is a Basque surname. Notable people with the surname include:

- Cristina Arámbulo Villanueva Manalo (born 1937), the widow of former Iglesia ni Cristo executive minister Eraño G. Manalo
- Félix Arámbulo (1942–2018), Paraguayan footballer

== See also ==
- Arámbula
