= 2015 Iglesia ni Cristo leadership controversy =

Dispute in the Philippines

A dispute between senior members of the Iglesia ni Cristo (INC) in the Philippines occurred in July 2015. It was reported that the INC had expelled some of its ministers, along with high-profile members Felix Nathaniel "Angel" Manalo and Cristina "Tenny" Villanueva Manalo, the brother and mother of current INC Executive Minister Eduardo Manalo, respectively.

The INC administration released a statement claiming that Eduardo had agreed to the expulsion of his brother and mother from the INC, as decided upon by its overall leadership. However, both Angel and Tenny claimed their lives were threatened by the Iglesia administration. Angel and Tenny had reportedly been illegally detained at the Iglesia's Central Office Complex in Tandang Sora, Quezon City, and that at least ten ministers of the Church were missing and alleged to have been abducted.

Former INC ministers Roel Rosal and Isaias Samson, Jr., claimed that the Sanggunián (the highest administrative council of the INC) had unlawfully abducted and detained ministers, along with members of the Manalo family, to cover up corruption surrounding the chief auditor, Glicerio "Jun" Santos, Jr. On July 24, 2015, the INC, represented by Glicerio B. Santos IV, head counsel and son of Santos, Jr., filed a libel complaint against Samson. Detained INC Evangelical Worker Lowell Menorca stated that he was forcibly detained by the INC administration, and was kidnapped at gunpoint by police officers in the employ of INC leaders and was forced to deny his captivity under duress. Menorca later fled to Canada and filed for refugee status, which was granted in 2018, with the Immigration and Refugee Board of Canada stating: "When the panel considers the links between the INC and the law enforcement authorities in the Philippines, the general climate of impunity that pervades Philippines law enforcement, particularly with respect to the issue of extrajudicial killing, and the level of corruption that exists in the Philippines government and law enforcement apparatus, the panel is satisfied Menorca would be unable to avail himself of state protection, from the risks that he fears in that country..."

== Overview ==
=== Angel and Tenny Manalo ===
On July 22, 2015, a video was uploaded to YouTube featuring Felix Nathaniel "Angel" Manalo, the brother to nominal INC leader Eduardo V. Manalo and a former general manager of Global Expansion Media Television (a terrestrial TV station broadcasting the INC's programs, now called INCTV), along with his mother, Cristina "Tenny" Villanueva Manalo, the widow of Eraño G. Manalo. In the video, they claimed their lives had been threatened by the INC leadership, along with that of Angel's sister, Lolita "Lottie" Manalo Hemedez. Tenny Manalo also claimed that there had been a mass kidnapping of ministers who had not been accounted for, implying that their disappearance somehow traced to the INC leadership, and that she had not been able to speak to her son.

However, the INC denied the claims. Bienvenido Santiago, INC's chief evangelist, announced a few hours after the video's release that the church was expelling Tenny and Angel Manalo for allegedly causing divisions in the church and wanting to seize power. Santiago claimed that their video was a sympathy ploy to gather support to meddle in the leadership of the INC and that the INC administration was acting on the wishes of Eduardo V. Manalo to prevent discord in the Church. Edwil Zabala, a spokesman for the INC, stated that the INC would consider having Tenny and Angel Manalo return to the Church if they would pledge to uphold and obey their teachings. Lottie Hemedez and another sibling, Marco Eraño "Marc" Villanueva Manalo, were also expelled.

After the response from the INC, an unidentified individual was photographed holding a sign saying "Tulong, hostage kami" (Tagalog: Help, we're [held] hostage) in a building that is part of the INC Central Office in the Tandang Sora district in Quezon City, Metro Manila, northeast of the capital Manila. When contacted by reporters, INC spokesman Edwil Zabala referred them to a CD recording of Santiago's statement regarding the expulsions.

In a press briefing that same afternoon, Santiago confirmed the expulsions. Santiago said, "Painful as it is to our brother Eduardo Manalo, they have decided to expel those who have been causing division within the Church. That is why in future worship services of the Church of Christ, from this day, the Overall Leadership will let this be known by all of our brothers".

The Philippine National Police, through its Quezon City Police District (QCPD), sent its personnel to the INC compound on July 23. They were able to contact Angel in the evening, and Angel himself talked to the reporters around 1:00 PST, denying he was detained and saying that sign pleading for help was done by a child joking around. QCPD Joel Pagdilao said that the police is ruling out case of abduction and described the concerned persons inside as peaceful and free.

Angel Manalo also spoke to the reporters and criticised the Church's Sanggunian, denied that he is challenging the leadership of his brother, Eduardo Manalo. He also advised his brother Eduardo against trusting people within the Sanggunian he alleged to be corrupt. He also criticised the decision's to build the Philippine Arena (a large indoor arena in Bocaue, Bulacan, the world's largest) instead of more houses of worship. He lamented the situation, saying, "Why is it that these days, there are many anomalies? Others might say we're challenging our brother. No, we love our brother. But our problem is with people around him." He added "The doctrine of the Iglesia ni Cristo is now damaged. In the same way that you looked up to us before, now you can see there are many anomalies. There are many acts of corruption in the Church. That's what we want to avoid"

On December 15, 2015, church guards prevented Manalo and his housekeepers from allowing members of the media to enter their ancestral house at 35 Tandang Sora Avenue, following the inspection of the sheriff of the Quezon City RTC. The court inspection was requested by church officials in order to identify the occupants of property, following reports that unknown masked and hooded persons were going in and out of the compound, located beside the INC central office, as well as in response to several ex-Marines who tried to go inside the compound, led by renegade soldier Capt. Nicanor Faeldon, and who were only stopped by INC security. INC spokesman Zabala also claimed that the Tandang Sora property was owned by INC. Angel Manalo also protested the construction of the high fences in the compound. The next day, the Quezon City Regional Trial Court (RTC) branch 22 ordered the INC to restore the electricity supply of the compound, remove and dismantle the blocking fences, and remove the guardhouse and portable toilet that blocked the vehicle gate #3 of the Manalo's home.

The INC planned to file an ejectment case against Manalo and Hemedez if the siblings refused to leave their residence in Tandang Sora. On her part, Manalo-Hemedez said that she is the real owner of the 36 Tandang Sora Avenue compound, having been owned the property since 1983. She maintained that she and her household would not leave the compound.

Presidential aspirant Roy Señeres visited the compound in January 2016. Guards barred Señeres from entering and refused to let him provide the occupants with food and bottled water.

=== Ministers ===
That same day, allegations from former and current INC ministers claimed that the Manalo family were hostages. Roel Rosal, a former Iglesia ni Cristo minister who stated that he and his wife were expelled from the church for trying to expose corruption, made a public statement that ten ministers along with the Manalos were under house arrest at the INC Central Office, at the behest of INC auditor general Glicerio B. "Jun" Santos, Jr. in order to prevent the revelation of financial corruption by Santos and his staff. Rosal claimed that Santos had pilfered and misused church offerings, and is holding the Manalos for "revenge." Supporters of Tenny and Angel Manalo gathered outside the compound demanding to know the whereabouts of the Manalos and missing ministers. GMA News reported that they saw an individual resembling Angel Manalo inside of the house, along with guards wielding long firearms.

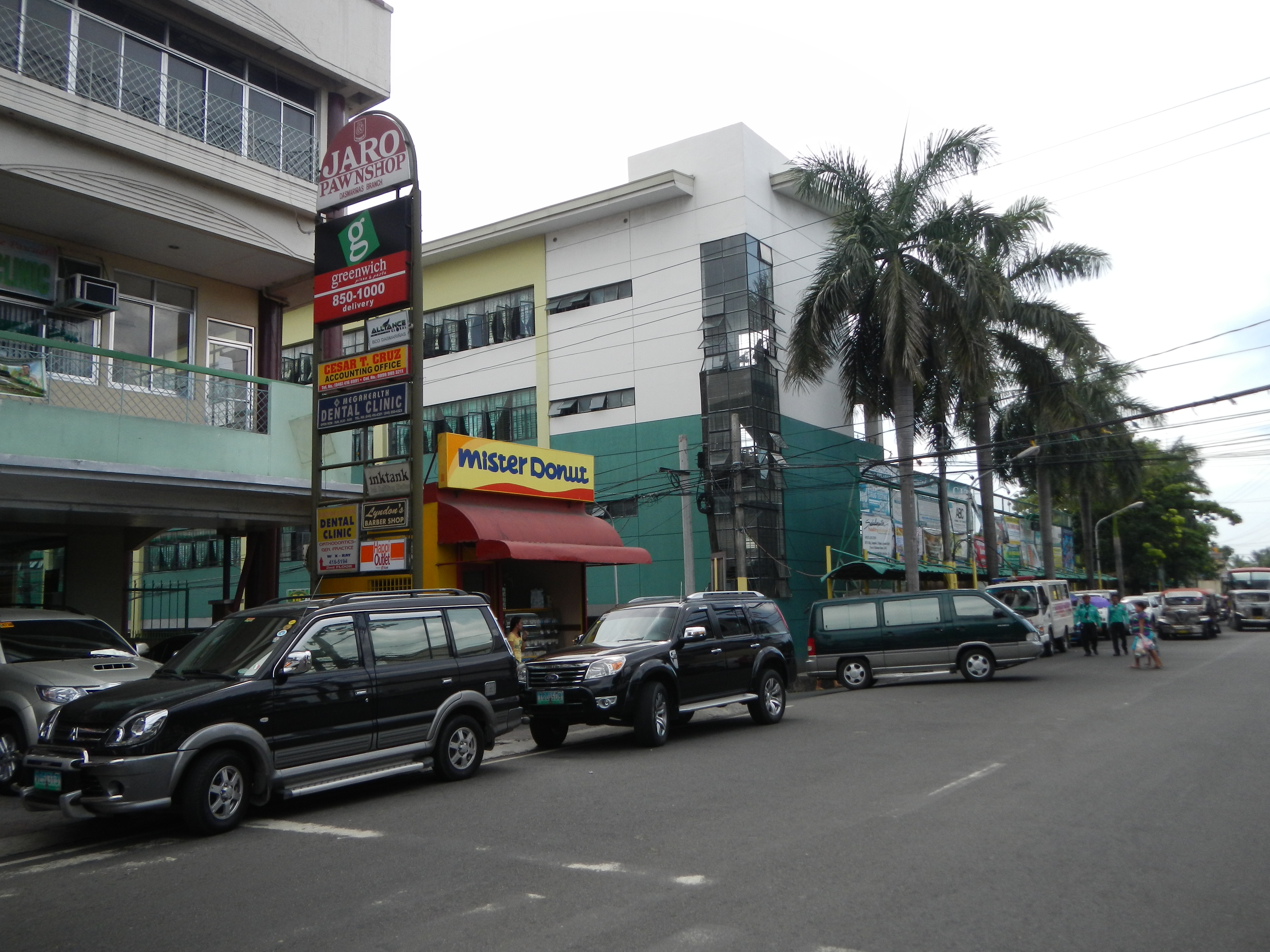
Dasmariñas, Cavite, located south of Manila. INC evangelical worker Lowell Menorca II was reported to have been arrested by local police in the city.

At least ten ministers are reported to be missing according to expelled minister Roel Rosal. One of the reported ministers, Lowell Menorca II was reported to have been arrested by the Philippine National Police in Dasmariñas, Cavite, located south of Manila after two construction workers were allegedly threatened by Menorca with a grenade. Menorca's lawyer, Allen Blair Boy from the New Era University Legal Aid, questioned whether he was abducted and Boy said that Menorca told him that he was indeed arrested. It is not clear why he was in Dasmariñas, as Menorca was based in Sorsogon province in the southern part of the island of Luzon.

On July 29, 2015, Rosal reiterated his claims against the INC leadership. He also accused the Quezon City Police Department of taking sides in the conflict by supporting the INC administration, and denying Angel and Tenny Manalo deliveries of food and water. Rosal also claimed that the captives in the Manalo compound were running out of food and water.

In a press conference held July 23, INC minister Isaias Samson, Jr. cited Menorca's case alleging that the military had taken him from Sorsogon to Dasmariñas. He said that the missing ministers were held at Rosalia Compound and the headquarters of the Quezon City Police Department in Quezon City.

Arnel Tumanan, Joven Sepillo of Tacloban, and Nolan Olarte of Cebu are among the other reported missing ministers.

The INC, thru attorney Serafin Cuevas, Jr., filed libel charges against Samson and Joy Yuson, former administrative coordinator of Global Expansion Media TV, then the TV arm of INC, for accusing the church and its Sanggunian members of involvement in various anomalies and alleged abductions of ministers. preliminary investigations for the said case started on September 16, 2015, at the Quezon City RTC.

Menorca released a video on October 23, 2015, a few days after he was allegedly rescued from abduction by the Sanggunian and the filing of writ of habeas corpus by his brother Anthony and sister-in-law Junko Azuka. In the video, he supported the claim that he, together with his wife, children, and housekeeper, were abducted and illegally detained from July 25 to October 21 in the Central Compound by the Sanggunian. He further claimed that he and his family never asked to the Church to give them a house, or to be put into protective custody. The supposed rescue of the Menorca household was first supported by attorney Trixie Cruz-Angeles, the lawyer of the INC's expelled ministers, including Jun Samson.

During the alleged illegal detention they claimed to have been barred from leaving the premises and accepting guests. Cellphones and gadgets were also said to not be allowed in the premises. After the video was uploaded, the Menorcas were expelled by the INC. The expulsion papers were signed by minister Radel Cortez.

=== Isaias Samson, Jr. ===
Isaias Samson, Jr. was a second-generation INC minister, former Sanggunian member and head of the Foreign Department. He had been demoted due to some cases in his department to the position of an editor of the INC's Pasugo magazine (a section of INC's Evangelism Department). He held a press conference on July 23 confirming his own detention, stating that he and his family were placed under house arrest by the INC administration, with the involvement of military and police officials. Samson stated that he was detained because of his opposition to Santos and gave a rough estimate of the amount of fund misused by Santos as in the "millions" of pesos, but he gave no evidence. Samson also stated that communication from the outside world was cut off and that passports, computers, phones and other electronic devices were confiscated. He was accused by INC leadership of being "Antonio Ebangelista," a pseudonym used by a minister who had written critical articles that revealed details on Church administration and Santos, a charge Samson denies. Samson and his family escaped by telling the guards they wanted to go to church service. Samson described his imprisonment as "unlawful detention," and called some in the INC administration "dishonest," but stated that he retained his faith in the INC. Samson later claimed corruption within the INC leadership regarding misuse of funds, such as in the "Lingap sa Mamamayan" fund, use of private planes, and investments in the oil industry. On July 25, 2015, INC spokesman Edwil Zabala stated that Samson and his family were expelled from the church for refusing to submit to authority.

Samson was replaced by Dennis C. Lovendino, a minister who became the new editor of Pasugo as of the June 2015 issue.

In a separate interview with CNN Philippines, Zabala said that the so-called house arrest of the family of Samson, Jr. was a disciplinary act within the Church (preventive suspension) in which Samson was under investigation, due to his connection to the group in social media that was claiming corruption issues inside the church.

On November 17, the Department of Justice dismissed the criminal case filed by Samson and fellow expelled member Lito de Luna Fruto against the INC leaders for lack of probable cause. Both Samson and Fruto accused the church of holding them against their will.

=== Loans ===
News website Rappler obtained documents on loans to the Iglesia Ni Cristo in 2014 from two Philippine banks, Metrobank and Asia United Bank, despite the positions of the founder of the church Felix Y. Manalo and his son Eraño G. Manalo against the church borrowing money, specially mortgaging church properties to banks. However, unearthed loan documents shows that Iglesia Ni Cristo, represented by Glicerio Santos Jr., the church's General Auditor and his son Atty. Glicerio Santos IV availed of billions of cash loans from Metrobank and Asia United Banks. In addition, several church properties located in Metro Manila, Bulacan, Nueva Ecija and Baguio, including the LIG Condominium housing church ministers and workers beside the church's central office were used as mortgage collateral in exchange for the billion loans. According to the public documents, the loans were obtained to fund the completion of the church's Philippine Arena and Ciudad de Victoria projects in Bulacan, despite the church leaders's initial pronouncements that the projects were wholly funded allegedly by members’ monetary offerings.

== Investigations ==
On July 24, 2015, the Department of Justice ordered the National Bureau of Investigation (NBI) to investigate allegations of abduction of INC members. However, it added that it would not interfere with internal disputes. On July 27, 2015, in a statement by Manuel Eduarte, chief of the NBI Anti-Organised Transnational Crime Division, said that the NBI concluded that insufficient evidence showed that the Iglesia ni Cristo abducted some of its ministers. However, on July 29, 2015, Secretary of Justice Leila de Lima clarified that the case had not been closed.

Vice President Jejomar Binay criticised de Lima's "unwarranted statements" asserting that the case remained open and noted her statement contradicts the reported findings of NBI Anti-Organised Transnational Crime Division. "By your actuations, you are promoting the image of disunity, discord and even corruption in the INC to its clear prejudice and detriment," Binay said that de Lima must respect the separation of church and state and "unwarranted interference" from the government in the church must not happen. Binay also described De Lima's dealings with the Iglesia ni Cristo controversy as akin to what he describes as a "policy of demolition" targeted towards his own person.

=== Protests in response to the investigation ===
On late evening of August 27, about 2,000 Iglesia members led by INC spokesman Edwil Zabala held a vigil outside the Department of Justice office in Manila and later moved to the Ortigas Interchange at Epifanio De los Santos Avenue and Ortigas Avenue, at the boundary between Quezon City and Mandaluyong, east of Manila. The demonstrators protested against the Department of Justice, led by de Lima, for allegedly persecuting their church and called for upholding the separation of church and state. They also called for the agency to prioritise more important issues.

== Reactions ==
=== Iglesia ni Cristo ===
==== Religious leaders ====
INC general evangelist Bienvenido Santiago, on July 23, 2015, responding to allegations made by the Manalos in a July 22 video, dismissed the accusations that some INC ministers were abducted and claimed that the two were attacking the church to make it appear that it was involved in the abductions. He also added that the video was an attempt to rally support from church members and to distract the church's management. Santiago said that the church's decision to expel the two Manalos was to show that the INC is a religion that follows the teachings of God found in the Bible, not a business.

In a morning Sunday worship on July 26, INC executive minister Eduardo Manalo repeated that members should strictly follow the church's leadership and rules to attain salvation.

The media reported that an INC member said that provincial ministers issued a set of tagubilin (instructions) towards the church's members during the weekend ahead of the church's 101st anniversary celebrations to be held on July 26 in Ciudad de Victoria complex in Bulacan. Among these reported instructions were that members decline media inquiries and travel by private cars to the celebrations. During the centennial celebrations, members were provided with service vehicles. Stickers for vehicles with "One with EVM" were reportedly distributed.

The media reported an unusually high number of worshipers and vehicles at the INC church in Los Baños. Several tarpaulins bearing the words "One with EVM" were posted outside the building.

==== Expelled members ====
Expelled INC minister Roel Rosal and his spouse, Shirley, told reporters on July 23, 2015, that at least 10 ministers were under house arrest. Rosal claimed that auditor Jun Santos and his staff were using donations for the INC to purchase luxury vehicles. He also said that Angel and Tenny Manalo were hostages. Roel said that the expulsion of the Manalos might have been influenced by a "third party" in the church administration.

Isaias Samson, Jr. at a July 23 press conference said that government intervention in the crisis would help resolve the issue. Samson was expelled from the INC the day after his press conference.

==== Other members and supporters ====
Fewer than 12 supporters of the church wearing white armbands organised a vigil in support of the Manalos in front of the INC compound in Tandang Sora. By 2:00 am of July 25, no INC member was seen camping outside the compound.

Some members used social media to express their support for Eduardo V. Manalo and the Sanggunian. Some members changed their profile photo to an image bearing the words "I am one with EVM," in support of the leadership of Eduardo Manalo.

On July 25, 2015, Louie Cayabyab, the minister of the Iglesia ni Cristo locale in Fremont, California, United States, resigned his position as minister as a response to the expulsions of Samson and Tenny and Angel Manalo. Cayabyab stated, "Beloved brethren, there are two circulars that are supposed to be read this morning. The first circular is about the expulsion from the Church of the wife and children of Bro. Erano G. Manalo. And another circular is the expulsion from the Church of Bro. Isaias T. Samson Jr., former editor-in-chief of the Pasugo. I decided, brethren, that I won’t read those circulars. You might be asking, 'why?' Because in my heart, in my heart of hearts, I can’t take it. It is, it is just so so difficult to betray one’s heart..." While Cayabyab asked INC members to remain in the church, he urged them to support peaceful vigils held in their areas, and implored them to support brethren in the Philippines "who are risking their lives" to expose corruption and reform the church.

In response to Cayabyab's resignation, members of the INC in Northern California, numbering in the "dozens," according to ABS-CBN News, held a protest at the INC's main United States office in Burlingame, California, demanding an investigation and tribunal into the corruption allegations, along with the reinstatement of Angel and Tenny Manalo. About a week later those who were identified as having taken part in the protests were expelled from the church.

Members of INC from 26 ecclesiastical districts picketed the Department of Justice office in Manila, when Secretary Leila de Lima, on her birthday, officially announced her 2016 senatorial bid. The assembly happened a few days after former minister Samson, Jr., his wife and son, filed illegal detention charges against eight members of the Sanggunian. A respondent of the case, Bienvenido Santiago, Sr., the church's general evangelist, wanted de Lima to focus instead on the Mamasapano clash.

==== Net 25 TV interview with allegedly missing ministers ====
In an interview with broadcaster Net 25 on July 29, 2015, a broadcaster owned and operated by INC affiliate Eagle Broadcasting Corporation, ministers Lowell "Boyet" Menorca II, Joel San Pedro, Jojo Nemis and Arnel Tumanan denied being held captive or tortured. They also affirmed their loyalty to the church administration and executive minister Eduardo Manalo and that they were still church members. The ministers also stated that members should not believe the claims of abduction.

However, Anthony Menorca, Boyet Menorca's brother, stated that his older brother was forced to deny his abduction because INC Sanggunian was holding Boyet Menorca's wife, Seiko Otsuka Menorca, and their one-year-old child. Anthony stated that in a meeting with his brother, he told him, "My brother warned us we will be killed." Anthony Menorca stated that he was in an undisclosed location and feared for the life of his brother.

In a new video released after he was allegedly rescued from the captivity of the Sanggunian on October 21, Menorca clarified, claiming that everything he said in the interview on Net 25 were "scripted".

==== Interview with Boyet Menorca ====
On August 1, 2015, Boyet Menorca, along with his wife and child, were interviewed in person outside the INC compound, wherein he denied all allegations of his abduction and pleaded for his brother to stop making claims. He added that he and his family voluntarily decided to stay within the compound because of safety concerns. He was worried that he could potentially be attacked in order to direct the resulting blame on the INC. After the interview, he and his family returned to the INC compound. Later, Menorca stated the interview was held "under duress."

==== Menorca recounts capture and being held hostage ====
On October 21, 2015, Lowell Menorca's brother Anthony petitioned the Supreme Court of the Philippines to issue writs of habeas corpus and amparo against the INC administration. The request was granted and on October 25, Menorca stated that he was illegally detained by INC, kidnapped by police officers allegedly in INC's employ and had been interrogated for 17 hours. He also stated that police officials tried to kill him afterwards using a hand grenade and that he had to beg for his life, successfully convincing a police officer allegedly hired to murder him not to go through with the killing.

==== Menorca's arrest in connection with libel charges ====
On January 20, 2016, on his way to the Court of Appeals to attend a hearing on the illegal detention case, policemen wearing civilian clothes and without badges led by Supt. Ed Leonardo and INC member, arrested Menorca on libel charges filed by SCAN International (the INC's amateur communications and disaster relief arm) in Kapatagan, Lanao del Norte, in the southern Philippines. A standoff between the police, Menorca and his wife Jinky occurred in Manila along Roxas Boulevard and Quirino Avenue when Menorca refused the arrest and claimed that the court had not notified him of libel charges. After the commotion, 20 policemen in uniform showed up to arrest Menorca. MPD Director Chief Supt. Rolando Nana stopped the standoff and told Menorca to go to MPD Station 5 for booking.

The church, through spokesman Edwil Zabala, said the INC strongly denied any involvement with the standoff and told Menorca to face the libel charges against him.

==== Key figures flee the Philippines ====
Menorca fled to Vietnam in March 2016. Moises Tolentino Jr., a lawyer for the Iglesia ni Cristo responded that: "Beset by several libel suits and an adultery charge to boot, [Menorca] took the cowardly option. He took a hurried flight last night bound for Vietnam. He is now a fugitive from justice..." and "Menorca is supposed to be the aggrieved party. If they were sincere, if they believed that they were in the right, they should not leave the country. They should face all opportunities that should be given to respondents..." Menorca left Vietnam two weeks later and traveled to Thailand planning to move to Seattle, Washington, since he had a valid United States visa, but because the rest of his family did not, he proceeded instead to seek asylum in Vancouver, British Columbia, Canada. He then filed an application for refugee status with the Government of Canada claiming that his life and that of his family members were threatened by the administration of the Iglesia ni Cristo. The Immigration and Refugee Board of Canada (IRB) granted Menorca refugee status in 2018, stating that Menorca was "a person in need of protection from a risk of cruel and unusual treatment or punishment and a risk to his life." The IRB further stated, "When the panel considers the links between the INC and the law enforcement authorities in the Philippines, the general climate of impunity that pervades Philippines law enforcement particularly with respect to the issue of extrajudicial killing, and the level of corruption that exists in the Philippines government and law enforcement apparatus, the panel is satisfied [Menorca] would be unable to avail himself of state protection, from the risks that he fears in that country...." and that "[The INC's] power and influence extends to an ability to utilise [police] to target the claimant." Aedtnavye Juntilla “AJ” Lazo, who was accused by her husband of having an affair with Menorca, was arrested in Cebu on June 22, 2019, for her failure to attend the mandatory court hearing in her adultery case, according to authorities. Both Lazo and her husband, Davis Chavez Flores, are members of Iglesia ni Cristo. Menorca replied to the accusations “Right now, no comment; they are digging up dirt and fabricating stories against me. I already talked to my lawyers about that."

Rovic Gloria Canono who was allegedly behind a blog entitled Sher Lock that supposedly denounced the corruption within the church's ranks, also fled the Philippines after being charged with various cases by church members including a libel case filed by INC top leader Eduardo Manalo. Canono arrived and applied for asylum in Canada in December 2016. In a hearing in February 2017, his claim was accepted by the Immigration and Refugee Board on the basis of religious persecution as mandated by the United Nations Convention on Refugees of 1951. Canono was allegedly found guilty of concubinage filed by members of Iglesia Ni Cristo. In 2019, Canono, a past president of the Rotary Club, was honoured by the Rotary Club of Circuit Makati with the Rovic Canono Human Rights Award for his valuable work in the protection of victims of human rights violations and religious persecution. The award is given to films that examine human rights in the Philippines.

==== Assassinations and disappearances of Iglesia ni Cristo critics ====
Jose Norulito Fruto was expelled from the INC in the early part of 2015 for his critical statements against the church. Fruto, who was also an American citizen, was initially under the witness protection program by the Philippine government in April 2015, as he claimed to have received threats due to his allegations against the INC leadership. In November 2015, he filed a complaint against members of the INC's top administrative body, the Sanggunian, accusing them of coercion, harassment, threats, and arbitrary detention. Fruto said he had been forcibly taken at gunpoint from his Caloocan residence based on a complaint of alleged rape against him, which he said was fabricated by INC. Fruto claimed that they were held by the INC against their will because of their supposed exposes against the church. He also said the judge in the rape case, who also slapped Fruto with a hold departure order, was a member of the INC. On May 24, 2017, whilst driving to Cavite, he was shot dead by an unidentified gunman at the southern terminus of the Cavite Expressway (CAVITEX), at the intersection with Tirona Highway in Kawit, Cavite, southwest of Manila. In a statement, Menorca hailed him as 'one of the bravest people" he knew, adding, "We just lost a comrade at arms, this is a sad day for truth-loving Christians all over the world."

At the height of the INC church crisis, two former members of the Iglesia ni Cristo (PND) have gone missing, in two separate incidents that occurred within days of each other. Danilo Patungan, a security guard for a condominium in Bonifacio Global City district of Taguig, Metro Manila, has been missing since leaving for work the afternoon of April 11, 2017. Days later, another expelled INC member, Felix Villocino, also went missing and had not returned to his Quezon City residence in days. Several excommunicated INC members fear that this was a repeat of the reported abductions of expelled church ministers. Both Patungan and Villocino had links to Angel Manalo. Patungan had been a security guard for Angel for 16 years, before moving to his current job at the condominium. Villocino, meanwhile, had long been delivering food and other supplies to the Manalos' residence in Tandang Sora, Quezon City. Villocino was expelled after siding with Angel Manalo. On April 20, 2017, around 06:70, Antonio Ebangelista, the pseudonymous blogger involved in leaking information regarding the internal structures of the INC, confirmed a radio report that a body found in Bustos, Bulacan north of Manila was that of Villocino.

=== Governmental ===
==== Politicians ====
The Bulacan chapter of the League of Municipalities of the Philippines (LMP) posted tarpaulin streamers with photographs of 20 mayors in the province greeting the church on its 101st anniversary. Pandi Mayor Enrico Roque, president of LMP Bulacan, said that the tarpaulin was displayed to express their continuing friendship and respect to the church, in response to a report that a Bulacan mayor complained to church leaders that a minister from the INC attempted to extort money from the official. Roque said that the group says that they are in complete support of the INC.

=== Eli Soriano ===
On his Twitter account, Eli Soriano of Members Church of God International expressed support for Secretary de Lima and urged her not to resign.

=== Other groups ===
==== Commission on Human Rights ====
Commission on Human Rights chairperson José Luis Martin "Chito" Gascon on July 24, 2015 said that the human rights body is monitoring the situation and had yet to launch a formal investigation. The rights body stated that it was avoiding a "premature conclusion" regarding the situation. It described the situation as "primarily a police matter" and is looking into allegations before taking action.

==== Catholic Bishops' Conference of the Philippines ====
Lingayen-Dagupan Archbishop Socrates Villegas, president of the Catholic Bishops' Conference of the Philippines, on July 24, 2015 requested prayers for Iglesia members. Villegas said in Tagalog, "As with their plea, I also ask that we pray for our brethren in the Iglesia ni Cristo...Brother Angel and his relatives are requesting prayers, that we pray for them." He added that he respected the decision of the Iglesia, which like the church, is "bound by rules and regulations".
