= Eduardo V. Manalo =

Executive Minister of the Iglesia ni Cristo since 2009

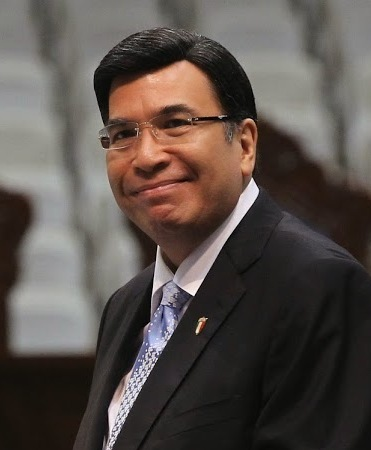
- Manalo in 2014

3rd Executive Minister of the Iglesia ni Cristo
- Incumbent
- Assumed office September 7, 2009
- Preceded by: Eraño Manalo

Personal life
- Born: Eduardo Villanueva Manalo; October 31, 1955 (age 70) Quezon City, Philippines
- Spouse: Lynn Ventura (m. 1982)
- Children: 3
- Parents: Eraño G. Manalo; Cristina Villanueva

Religious life
- Religion: Filipino Protestantism (Note: Iglesia Ni Cristo (INC) would not appear as a separate denomination until the 1948 Philippine census.)
- Church: Iglesia ni Cristo
- Ordination: May 9, 1980, at Locale Congregation of Tondo (Manila)

Senior posting
- Based in: INC Central Office Complex, Quezon City, Philippines
- Period in office: September 7, 2009 – Present (17 years, 1 month, 17 days)
- Predecessor: Eraño G. Manalo
- Previous post: Deputy Executive Minister; Coordinator of Metro Manila Districts; Assistant Dean of Evangelical College (EVCO)

Eduardo Villanueva Manalo (Tagalog pronunciation: [ɛdˈwaɾdo mɐˈnalɔ]; born on October 31, 1955), is a Filipino preacher who is the current and 3rd Executive Minister of the Iglesia ni Cristo. He is the third generation of the Manalo family to lead the church following his father, the late Eraño G. Manalo, and his grandfather, Felix Manalo, the First Leader of Iglesia ni Cristo in The Philippines. (Note: According to INC doctrine, God's four messengers in the church era are Jesus Christ, Paul the Apostle, Martin Luther, and Felix Manalo.)

== Early life and education ==
Eduardo V. Manalo was born on October 31, 1955 in to Eraño G. Manalo and Cristina Villanueva. His name means “guardian”. His grandfather, Felix Manalo named him.

Manalo completed his high school education at Jose Abad Santos Memorial School in Quezon City. He then earned a Bachelor of Arts degree in Philosophy from the University of the Philippines (UP), Diliman. While pursuing his undergraduate studies, he also enrolled in ministerial studies at the Evangelical College, which later became the New Era University College of Evangelical Ministry (now known as Iglesia Ni Cristo School for Ministers). He graduated from UP in 1978 and from Evangelical College in 1980.

== Early years in the ministry ==
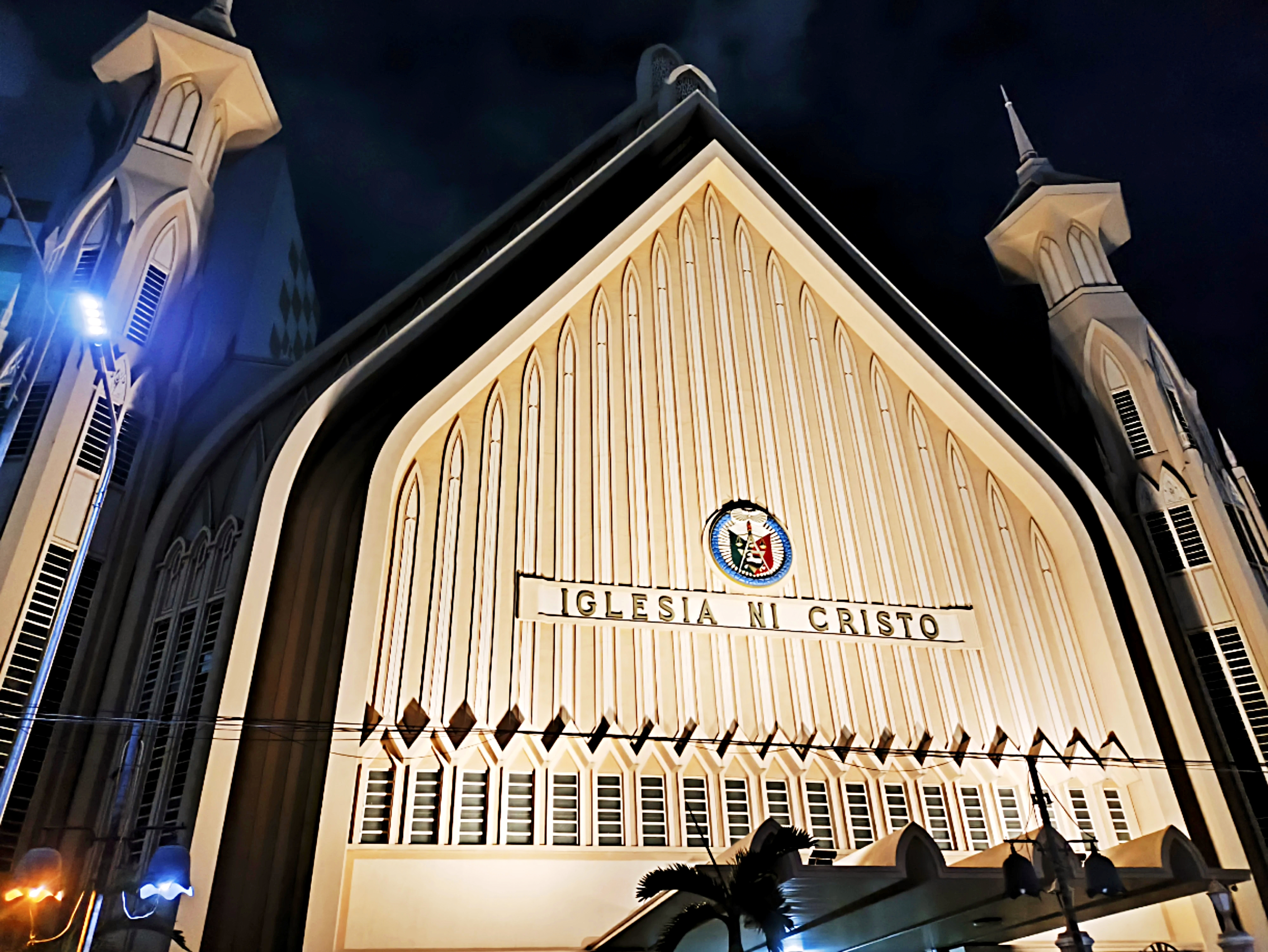
The INC Locale of Tondo, established on November 6, 1915, is one of the earliest congregations of the church. The current structure was completed in 1967.

After graduating from EVCO, his first assignment was in the INC's Local Congregation of Cubao in Quezon City. He was ordained as a minister on May 9, 1980, at the INC house of worship in Tondo, Manila. After a brief assignment in the Local Congregation of Project 4, Quezon City, he was appointed Assistant Dean of EVCO. He hosted a religious radio program over DZEC and was one of the first panelists on the TV program, Ang Iglesia ni Cristo. His administrative capability was further honed as a Coordinator of the Metro Manila Ecclesiastical Districts (at present, Metro Manila is divided into nine (9) districts) beginning in 1984:

- Caloocan North
- Camanava
- Central
- Makati
- Marikina
- Manila
- Metro Manila East
- Metro Manila South
- Quezon City

== Information and communication technology involvement ==
Eduardo Manalo founded the Society of Communicators and Networkers (SCAN) for INC members with a common interest in radio communication to help and assists the community during emergencies. He also began and maintained a popular Bulletin Board System (BBS) and further developed his programming skills. He organized the Data and Network Management (DNM) office, which oversaw the computerization of the entire INC Central Office. He sponsored Internet seminars for ministers in various ecclesiastical districts of the church. In an article "RP marks 7th year on the Internet" in the March 2001 edition of the magazine Computerworld Philippines, Filipino information technology enthusiasts recognized Eduardo Manalo as belonging to the "group of pioneers that brought the nation into the Internet Age".

He contributed to the founding of an organization within the INC called The Association of Christians in Information Technology, an organization consisting of INC members in the Information technology field who perform computer-related assistance to the church. This organization was renamed and became the Association of Computer Technologists and Information Volunteers (ACTIV) on 2012.

== Deputy Executive Minister (1994-2009) ==
On May 7, 1994, Manalo assumed his responsibility as Deputy Executive Minister of the Iglesia ni Cristo after being elected unanimously by the Church Executive Council at the Central Temple. As a Deputy Executive Minister, he will be the successor of the Office of the Executive Minister and also has the task to temporarily assume the duties of Executive Minister during the latter's absence. He was entrusted with the task of registering the INC officially in Rome, Italy, in 1994. In 1996, along with 11 ministers, he joined the then Executive Minister Eraño G. Manalo in establishing the INC's local congregation in Jerusalem, Israel. In 1997, he also accompanied on establishing the congregation in Athens, Greece.

Over the months of July to August 1998, he conducted a pastoral visitation to Hawaii and the US in commemoration of the 30th year of the INC in the West. Another major pastoral visitation took place over the months of April to May 2006, to the local congregations in Europe, Middle East, and Asia.

== Administration ==
With sixteen years (2009-2025) of leadership of the Church since Eduardo V. Manalo assumed the office as the Church's Executive Minister, INC has ordained 5,288 ministerial workers to become new ministers starting from January 2, 2010 until September 20, 2025. With almost 6,000 ministerial students to become future ministers in Iglesia Ni Cristo School For Ministers for Academic Year 2025-2026. 21 New Extensions of the School For Ministers added (14 in the Philippines and 7 abroad). INC has ordained 29 Head Deacons to become new Bishops assigned in the Locale Congregation from May 23, 2015, in Las Piñas (Metro Manila South) to January 15, 2023, in Paco (Manila). Opened 1,228 new local congregations with 1,434 new extensions being groomed to become local congregations, 78 additional countries and territories reached by the Church, and 100 ecclesiastical districts. There are 205 in this current. and 3 main offices:

- Burlingame, California, USA [US West Office]
- Washington D.C., USA [US East Office]
- Heathrow, London, United Kingdom [Europe Main Office]

18 administrative infrastructure projects were inaugurated within thirteen years from the time he assumed his office (September 7, 2009, to March 15, 2022). On January 2, 2010, he ordained 202 new ministers at Central Temple to commemorate the 85th birthday of Eraño G. Manalo. The worldwide, where INC Engineering and Construction Department undertakes the church's construction projects were dedicated, a total of 3,964 from September 7, 2009, to July 13, to spread out the Dynamic Leadership of Eduardo Manalo (605 new houses of worship dedicated since the COVID-19 pandemic to the present). The biggest house of worship outside the Philippines can be found in Barcelona, Spain which can accommodate 1,360 worshipers at a time. INC bought the property from Jehovah's Witnesses and it was dedicated in July 2012. The most expensive house of worship of the INC can be found in Washington DC. Acquisition and renovations cost more than US$10.6 million. The property includes a school building which was formerly owned by Helen and Constantine Greek Orthodox Church. The house of worship was dedicated in December 2012.

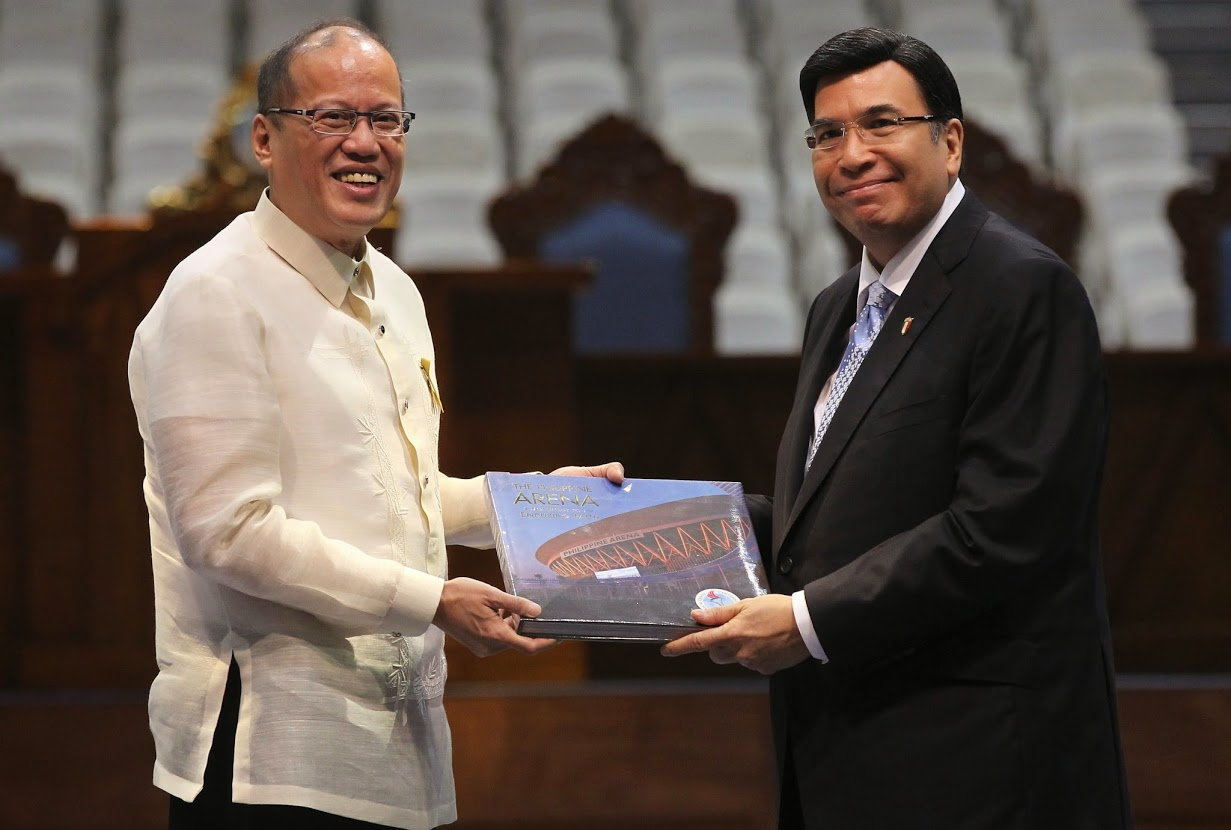
Philippine President Benigno Aquino III (left) receives a commemorative coffee table book from Executive Minister Manalo during the inauguration rites of the Ciudad de Victoria.

On July 21, 2014, Philippine president Benigno Aquino III and Manalo led the inauguration of Ciudad de Victoria, a 140-hectare tourism zone in Bocaue and Santa Maria, Bulacan, where the Philippine Arena is also located. The Philippine Arena, a 55,000-seater multi-purpose structure, touted as the world's largest indoor domed arena (by seating capacity), was constructed for the INC's centennial celebration on July 27, 2014.

On March 14, 2014, after conducting a worship service in Tacloban, Leyte, INC Executive Minister Eduardo V. Manalo, led the groundbreaking ceremony of EVM Self-Sustainable Community Rehabilitation Project in Sitio New Era, a 3,000-hectare property of the church in Brgy. Langit, Alangalang, Leyte. The project which could cost more than one billion pesos includes at least 1,000 housing units for the survivors of Super Typhoon Haiyan. Garments and dried fish factories, and eco-farming project are also included to provide livelihood to the community. More than 150,000 hunger relief packages were also given which contained 3 kilos of rice, canned goods and instant noodles aside from the free medical and dental services conducted that day.

He was the Executive Minister who visited the continents of:

- Africa > 2014, 2016 and 2017
- Australia > 2011, 2014, 2016 and 2017
- South America > 2017

He was the Executive Minister who officiated the Ordination of New Ministers outside the Philippines; in the Local Congregation of Humble (Texas), USA last December 28, 2011.

He was the Executive Minister who officiated the International Conference of Ministers, Ministerial Workers and Ministerial Students outside the Philippines in the Continent of America; in the Local Congregation of Sacramento (Northeast California), USA last December 30, 2013.

He was the Executive Minister who officiated the Holy Supper Worship Service outside the Philippines; in the Local Congregation of Seattle, Washington (Washington State), USA last February 28, 2015.

== Political appointments ==
Manalo was appointed by President Rodrigo Duterte as Special Envoy for Overseas Filipino Concerns, succeeding Roy Cimatu who held the position. Manalo's tenure lasted from January 30, 2018 to January 29, 2019.

Manalo was reappointed by President Bongbong Marcos as Special Envoy for Overseas Filipino Concerns again, with his second tenure lasting from September 2, 2023 to September 1, 2024.

== Personal life ==
Manalo met Lynn "Babylyn" Ventura while studying at the University of the Philippines in the 1970s, with the two marrying on January 2, 1982; they have three children: Dorothy Kristine, Gemma Minna, and Angelo Eraño.

== In media ==
Manalo was portrayed by Dale Baldillo in the 2015 biographical film Felix Manalo.

== Family tree ==
Manuel Manalo	Candida Torres
Maria Cruz	Andres Manalo
Bonifacia Manalo
Tomasa Sereneo (d. 1912)	Felix Manalo (1886–1963)	Honorata de Guzman
Gerardo Manalo (1912)	Pilar Manalo-Danao (1914–1987)	Avelina Manalo-Makapugay	Dominador Manalo	Salvador Manalo	Eraño Manalo (1925–2009)	Cristina Villanueva (b. 1937)	Bienvenido Manalo (b. 1935)
Lynn Ventura	Eduardo Manalo (b. 1955)	Lolita Manalo-Hemedez	Erlinda Manalo-Alcantara	Liberty Manalo-Albert	Felix Nathaniel Manalo II	Marco Eraño Manalo
Dorothy Kristine Manalo-Orasa	Gemma Minna Manalo-de Guzman	Angelo Eraño Manalo

== See also ==
- 2015 Iglesia ni Cristo leadership controversy

== Notes ==
Religious titles
Preceded by Eraño Manalo	Executive Minister of Iglesia ni Cristo; 2009–present	Incumbent
