= Bienvenido Manalo =

Filipino architect and former racing driver

- Born: August 28, 1935 (age 91)
- Parents: Felix Manalo; Honorata de Guzman
- Relatives: Pilar Manalo Danao (sister); Eraño Manalo (brother); Eduardo V. Manalo (nephew)

Bienvenido "Bien" de Guzman Manalo (born August 28, 1935) is a Filipino architect and former racing driver. He is the youngest son of Felix Manalo, founder and first Executive Minister of the Iglesia ni Cristo church, and brother of Eraño Manalo, the second Executive Minister. As head of the Engineering and Construction Department of the church, Manalo oversaw the construction of church buildings since the 1970s.

== Racing career ==
Manalo's racing career lasted from 1966 to the 1970s. In the 1960s, he became good friends with fellow racer Edward "Eddie" Marcelo. During the Mid-year Drag Jamboree in 1969, Manalo won the Presidential Trophy with his 1957 Chevrolet. Two of the others vehicles Manalo used in drag racing competitions was a blue Corvette Stingray and his brother Dominador's brown Chevrolet Camaro.

In 2013, Manalo was inducted into the Golden Wheel Hall of Fame at the 2013 Golden Wheel Awards.

== Iglesia ni Cristo ==
During the early 1970s, when his brother Eraño Manalo was Executive Minister of the Iglesia ni Cristo (INC), Bienvenido oversaw the maintenance of the church's service vehicles.

Upon the formal establishment of INC's Engineering and Construction Department in 1971, Manalo was appointed as its chief. Prior to the department's establishment, Manalo's eldest brother Dominador "Ka Dorling" Manalo headed the Engineering and Construction Group of the church.

In lawyer Rodante Marcoleta's 1989 essay on INC architecture, he characterized the department under Manalo as having "meticulous attention to even the minutest detail" in the construction of church buildings.

== In media ==
Manalo was portrayed by Ronnie Liang and Jon Lucas in the 2015 biographical film Felix Manalo.
