= Felix Manalo (film) =

- Theatrical release poster
- Directed by: Joel C. Lamangan
- Written by: Bienvenido C. Santiago
- Produced by: Vincent del Rosario III; Veronique del Rosario-Corpus
- Starring: Dennis Trillo; Bela Padilla
- Cinematography: Rody Lacap
- Edited by: John Anthony L. Wong
- Music by: Von de Guzman
- Production company: Viva Films
- Distributed by: Viva Entertainment
- Release dates: October 4, 2015 (Philippine Arena); October 7, 2015 (Philippines; wider theatrical release)
- Running time: 176 minutes
- Country: Philippines
- Languages: Filipino; English
- Budget: ₱150 million (US$3.3 million)
- Box office: ₱226 million (US$4.8 million)

Felix Manalo is a 2015 Filipino biographical film about the life of Felix Manalo, the first Executive Minister of the Iglesia ni Cristo (INC; English: Church of Christ), and the church he preached. Manalo is regarded by the members of the Iglesia ni Cristo as the last messenger of God and the restorer of the true Church of Christ, whom the INC gives the title Sugò (Tagalog: "messenger" or "envoy"). The story and screenplay were written by INC evangelism head Bienvenido Santiago. The film was directed by Joel Lamangan. All content of the film was screened and approved by the INC.

== Synopsis ==
Felix Manalo (portrayed by Trillo) studies, joins, doubts, and eventually leaves both Catholicism and Protestantism before starting a church he believes to be a restoration of the Biblical church founded by Jesus.

== Cast ==
=== Main cast ===
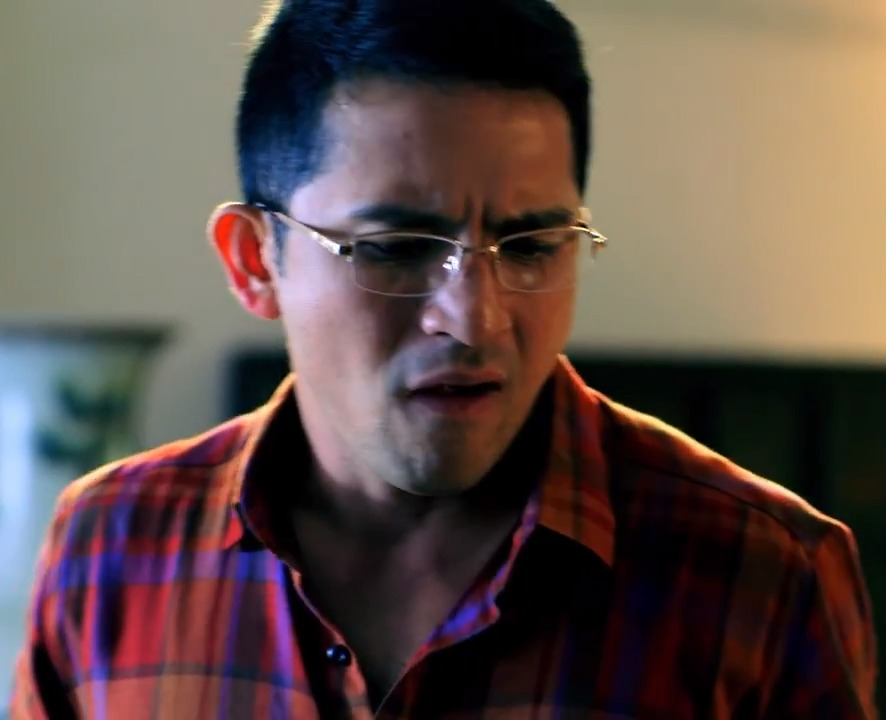
Dennis Trillo portrays Felix Y. Manalo

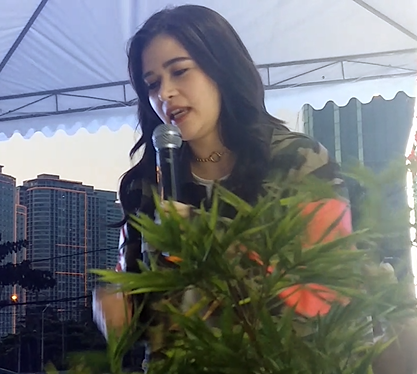
Bela Padilla portrays Honorata "Ata" de Guzmán-Manalo

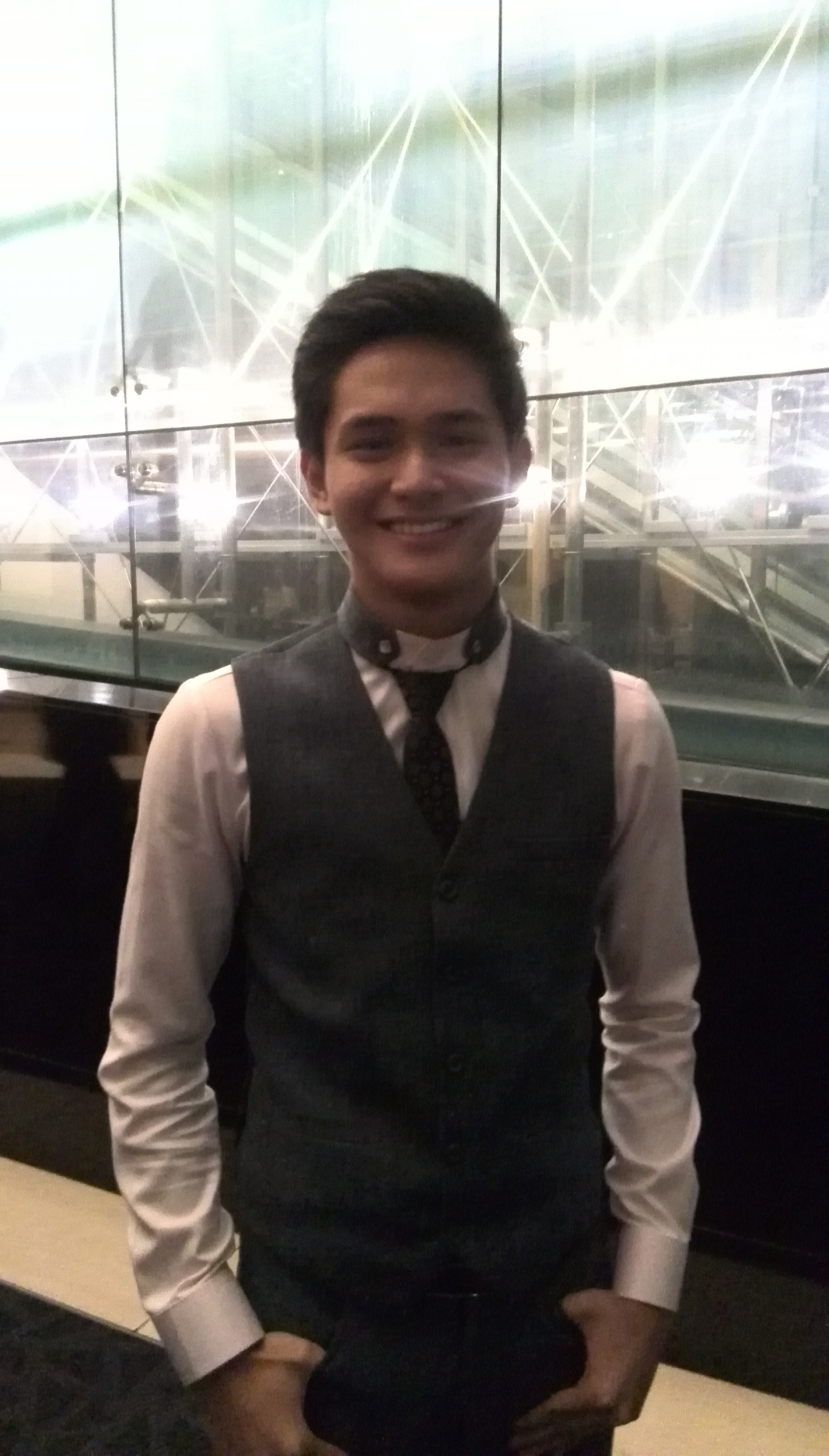
Ruru Madrid portrays Eusebio Serapio

- Dennis Trillo as Felix Y. Manalo
  - Carl Acosta as young Felix Manalo
- Bela Padilla as Honorata "Ata" de Guzmán-Manalo

=== Supporting cast (in alphabetical order) ===
- Allan Paule as INC Member / Kapatid
- Alex Medina as Avelina's Husband
- Alfred Vargas as Prudencio Vásquez
- Alice Dixson as Lilia
- Alvin Fortuna as Doro
- Andrea del Rosario as Salvador's Wife
- Anita Hain as Mrs. Wolfe
- Antonio Aquitania as Atanacio "Tana" Morte
- Arci Muñoz as Tomasa Sereneo-Manalo
- Bembol Roco as Quintín Rivera
- Biboy Ramirez as Elias
- Bobby Andrews as Apolinario "Inar" Ramos
- Boy 2 Quizon as Maximiano "Mianong" Diosenito
- Brian Arda as Pastor
- Caprice Cayetano as Lilia's Daughter
- China Cojuangco as Glicerio's Wife
- Chris Perris as Finster
- Christian Vasquez as Avelina's Husband
- Christopher Roxas as Sandoval
- Crispin Pineda as Kutsero 1
- Dale Baldillo as Eduardo "Eddie Boy" V. Manalo
- Dexter Doria as Tiya Isabel
- Dennis Coronel as Turla
- Dennis Pascual as Simbilio
- Eddie Gutierrez as Pastor Victoriano Mariano
- Ejay Falcon as Serapio Dionisio
- Elizabeth Oropesa as Cianang
- Ermie Concepcion as Kumadrona
- Felix Roco as Bangkero
- Gabby Concepcion as Eraño "Ka Erdy" G. Manalo
  - AJ Muhlach as young Erdy Manalo
- Gilleth Sandico as Babae 1
- Gladys Reyes as Avelina Manalo-Makapugay
  - Anja Aguilar as young Avelina
- Glydel Mercado as Dominador's Wife
- Heart Evangelista as Cristina "Ka Tenny" Villanueva-Manalo
- Jaclyn Jose as Tiya Victorina
- Jacky Woo as Rev. Nakada
- Jaime Fabregas as Fr. Mariano de Borja
- Jaime Pebanco as Justino Casanova
- Jason Lacson as Grandchild
- Jay Manalo as INC Member / Kapatid
- Jess Evardone as Juanario
- Johan Santos as Pilar's Husband
- Joel Torre as Teofilo "Ka Pilo" Ramos
- Joem Bascon as Lucio Silvestre
- Jon Lucas / Ronnie Liang as Bienvenido "Bien" G. Manalo
  - Wreijh Casimiro as young Bien
- Joshua Clemente as Modesto
- Kevin Kier Remo as Bully Kid 1
- Kristel Fulgar as Grandchild
- Kuya Manzano as Prayle
- Lander Vera Perez as Rev. Nicolas Zamora
- Lloyd Samartino as Atty. Juan Natividad
- Lorna Tolentino as Doctor
- Marco Brillo as Bully Kid 2
- Mark Anthony Robrigado as Andres Tucker
- Martin Escudero as Jun Santos
- Martin Venegas as Bully Kid 3
- Menggie Cobarrubias as Teodoro Briones
- Mike Magat as Federico
- Mon Confiado as Leoncio Javier
- Mylene Dizon as Bonifacia "Facia" Manalo
- Neil Ryan Sese as Tomas dela Cruz
- Noel Colet as Salvador
  - Arkin del Rosario as young Salvador
- Paul Holme as Rev. Leslie Wolfe
- Phillip Salvador as Seventh Day Adventist Pastor
- Phoemela Barranda as Benjamin's Wife
- Ping Medina as War Victim
- Ramon Christopher Gutierrez as Maestro Cario
- Raymond Bagatsing as Carling
- Raymond Lauchengco as Dominador
  - Edison Piloton as young Dominador
- Regine Angeles as Asi
- Rey "PJ" Abellana as Pilar's Husband
- Ricardo Cepeda as Rosendo de Guzmán
- Richard Cunanan as Bruce Kershner
- Richard R. Felkey as Rev. J.B. Daugherty
- Richard Manabat as Methodist Pastor
- Richard Quan as Teofelo Ora
- Richard Yap as Glicerio Santos
- Ronnie Golpeo as INC Member / Kapatid
- Ronnie Liang as Ben Santiago
- Roxanne Barcelo as Praxedes Ysagun
- Ruby Ruiz as Marcelina
- Ruru Madrid as Eusebio Sunga
- Ryan Eigenmann as Methodist Pastor
- Sheryl Cruz as Sanang
- Simon Ibarra as Mariano
- Snooky Serna as Pilar Manalo-Danao
  - Carla Humphries / Hannah Joy Magdales as young Pilar
- TJ Trinidad as Pastor Emiliano Quijano
- Tonton Gutierrez as Benjamin Santiago
- Tony Mabesa as Pastor Guillermo Zarco
- Wendell Ramos as Juanario Ponce
- William Lorenzo as Ministro
- Yul Servo as Clemente "Mente" Mozo

== Production ==
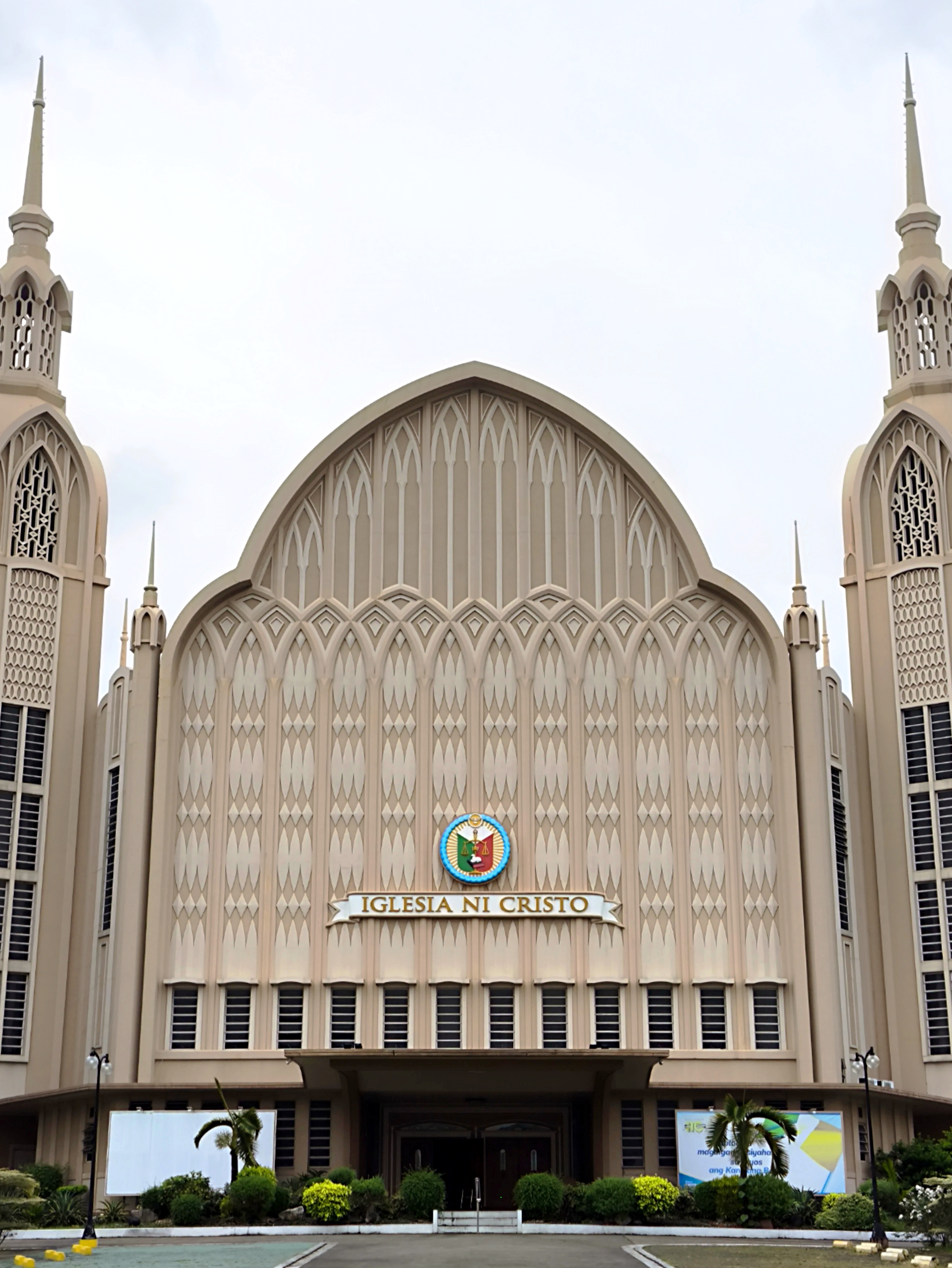
Completed on July 27, 1962, the Iglesia Ni Cristo (INC) Lokal ng San Francisco del Monte, also known locally as the Lokal ng Frisco, was featured in the film.

Joel Lamangan served as the overall director of the film with Armando Reyes as the assistant director, and Glicerio Santos III as the creative producer. The production design was done by Edgar Martin Littaua, Joel Marcelo Bilbao and Daniel Red. Other members of the production team were Iglesia ni Cristo spokesperson Bienvenido Santiago (story and screenplay), Rody Lacap (director of photography), Albert Michael Idioma (sound supervisor), Von de Guzman (musical director), John Wong (film editor), and Juvan Bermil (makeup and hair design). The script was written by the head of evangelism of the INC, and the church approved of all content in the film.

About one hundred actors were included in the cast, while 8,000 people were hired as extras. Scenes were shot in Metro Manila, Laguna, Subic, and Bataan. This includes the INC Chapel F. Manalo (formerly Riverside) in San Juan, and the chapel in San Francisco del Monte, Quezon City, which was used in the funeral. Laguna de Bay stood in for the Pasig River in the baptism scenes. The original cut of the film was about six hours (360 minutes) in length, but a shorter version was used for its theatrical release.

=== Casting ===
Initially, Richard Gomez, Albert Martinez and Ramon "Bong" Revilla Jr. were tapped to play Felix Manalo, Eraño Manalo and Eduardo Manalo, respectively. However, Gomez and Revilla would later drop out of the project. Bong Revilla, who is also an incumbent Senator at that time, withdrew after he got implicated in the PDAF scam reasoning that it would be shameful to portray a religious leader when he himself is riddled with political controversy.

Martinez would then be cast in the role of Felix Manalo, with Dennis Trillo playing a younger Felix Manalo. Martinez also withdrew following the death of his wife, Liezl Martinez. Trillo would go on to play both the young and old Felix Manalo.

== Soundtrack ==
The theme song and music video of the film entitled "Ang Sugo ng Diyos sa mga Huling Araw" (English: The Messenger of God in the Last Days) was released on October 4, 2015, at the Philippine Arena. The song was performed by Sarah Geronimo, composed by Joan and Ryan Solitario, and arranged by Louie Ocampo.

== Release ==
On October 4, 2015, its premiere broke three Guinness world records for the largest audience in a film premiere, the largest audience in a film screening and the largest paying audience for a film premiere, with 43,624 attendees. VIVA Films set up a five-story, 22 by 40 meters high definition screen for the premiere at the Philippine Arena.

The film's theatrical runtime is 175 minutes. According to Pilipino Star Ngayon, an insider of Viva Films informed them that a 6-hour version of the film is intended to be included in the DVD release.

Felix Manalo was released in Philippine cinemas on October 7, 2015.

== Reception ==
The Cinema Evaluation Board of the Philippines, the governing council for Filipino films, gave the film an "A". The film was graded based on its direction, screenplay, cinematography, editing, production design, music scoring, sound, and acting performances.

=== Box Office ===
Felix Manalo earned ₱50 million on its opening day. The movie earned a total of ₱226 million or $4.8 million dollars in its theaterical run according to the data released by Box Office Mojo in 2015.

=== Critical reception ===
Reviewers have noted the makeup team's work on Trillo, which during the course of the film ages him from a young man through to age 76, and the nearly three-hour running time. The PhilStar commended the film's recreation of multiple historical time periods. The Manila Bulletin states the film "makes no qualms in its aim to preach" and that a lot of money was spent on the film because it will be "screened in several INC gatherings for many years to come."

Philbert Ortiz Dy of ClickTheCity was also critical, giving it 2 out of 5 stars and wrote, "It is slow, ponderous, and focuses on things that aren't very interesting at all." While Michael Alegre of the Philippine Online Chronicles did not give a rating, he said in his review that it suffers from "a lack of focus, excessive content, an uneven pace, some jerky editing, and a noticeable partiality towards Felix Manalo".

Fred Hawson of ABS-CBN gave the film 7 out of 10 stars, praising the film's production, cinematography, and acting (particularly of Trillo), and noted the film's educational value "to know our INC brothers better."

=== Accolades ===
Year	Award-giving body	Category	Recipient	Result
2016	32nd Philippine Movie Press Club (PMPC) Star Awards for Movies	Movie of the Year	Felix Manalo	Won
2016	32nd Philippine Movie Press Club (PMPC) Star Awards for Movies	Movie Director of the Year	Joel Lamangan	Won
2016	32nd Philippine Movie Press Club (PMPC) Star Awards for Movies	Movie Actor of the Year	Dennis Trillo	Won
2016	32nd Philippine Movie Press Club (PMPC) Star Awards for Movies	Movie Supporting Actress of the Year	Bela Padilla	Nominated
2016	32nd Philippine Movie Press Club (PMPC) Star Awards for Movies	Movie Screenwriter of the Year	Bienvenido Santiago	Nominated
2016	32nd Philippine Movie Press Club (PMPC) Star Awards for Movies	Movie Cinematographer of the Year	Rody Lacap	Nominated
2016	32nd Philippine Movie Press Club (PMPC) Star Awards for Movies	Movie Production Designer of the Year	Edgar Martin Littaua, Joel Bilbao, and Danny Red	Won
2016	32nd Philippine Movie Press Club (PMPC) Star Awards for Movies	Movie Editor of the Year	John Anthony Wong	Nominated
2016	32nd Philippine Movie Press Club (PMPC) Star Awards for Movies	Movie Musical Scorer of the Year	Von de Guzman	Nominated
2016	32nd Philippine Movie Press Club (PMPC) Star Awards for Movies	Movie Sound Engineer of the Year	Albert Michael Idioma	Nominated
2016	32nd Philippine Movie Press Club (PMPC) Star Awards for Movies	Movie Original Theme Song of the Year	“Ang Sugo Ng Diyos Sa Mga Huling Araw” – composed by Joan Solitario and Ryan Solitario; arranged by Louie Ocampo; interpreted by Sarah Geronimo	Won
2016	34th Luna Awards	Best Picture	Felix Manalo	Nominated
2016	34th Luna Awards	Best Director	Joel Lamangan	Nominated
2016	34th Luna Awards	Best Actor	Dennis Trillo	Nominated
2016	34th Luna Awards	Best Screenplay	Bienvenido Santiago	Nominated
2016	34th Luna Awards	Best Cinematography	Rody Lacap	Nominated
2016	34th Luna Awards	Best Production Design	Edgar Martin Littaua	Nominated
2016	34th Luna Awards	Best Musical Scoring	Von de Guzman	Nominated
2016	34th Luna Awards	Best Sound	Albert Michael Idioma and Lamberto Casas Jr.	Nominated
2016	2016 FAMAS Awards	Best Picture	Felix Manalo	Won
2016	2016 FAMAS Awards	Best Director	Joel Lamangan	Won
2016	2016 FAMAS Awards	Best Actor	Dennis Trillo	Won
2016	2016 FAMAS Awards	Best Actress	Bela Padilla	Nominated
2016	2016 FAMAS Awards	Best Child Performer	Carl Acosta	Nominated
2016	2016 FAMAS Awards	Best Story	Bienvenido Santiago	Nominated
2016	2016 FAMAS Awards	Best Screenplay	Bienvenido Santiago	Won
2016	2016 FAMAS Awards	Best Cinematography	Rody Lacap	Nominated
2016	2016 FAMAS Awards	Best Editing	John Anthony Wong	Nominated
2016	2016 FAMAS Awards	Best Sound	Albert Michael Idioma	Nominated
2016	2016 FAMAS Awards	Best Musical Score	Von de Guzman	Nominated
2016	2016 FAMAS Awards	Best Theme Song	“Ang Sugo Ng Diyos Sa Mga Huling Araw” – composed by Joan Solitario and Ryan Solitario; arranged by Louie Ocampo; interpreted by Sarah Geronimo	Won
2016	2016 FAMAS Awards	Best Production Design	Joel Bilbao, Edgar Martin Littaua and Daniel Red	Nominated
2016	2016 FAMAS Awards	Best Visual Effects	Adrian Arcega	Nominated
