= Pilar Manalo Danao =

Filipina choir director (1914–1987)

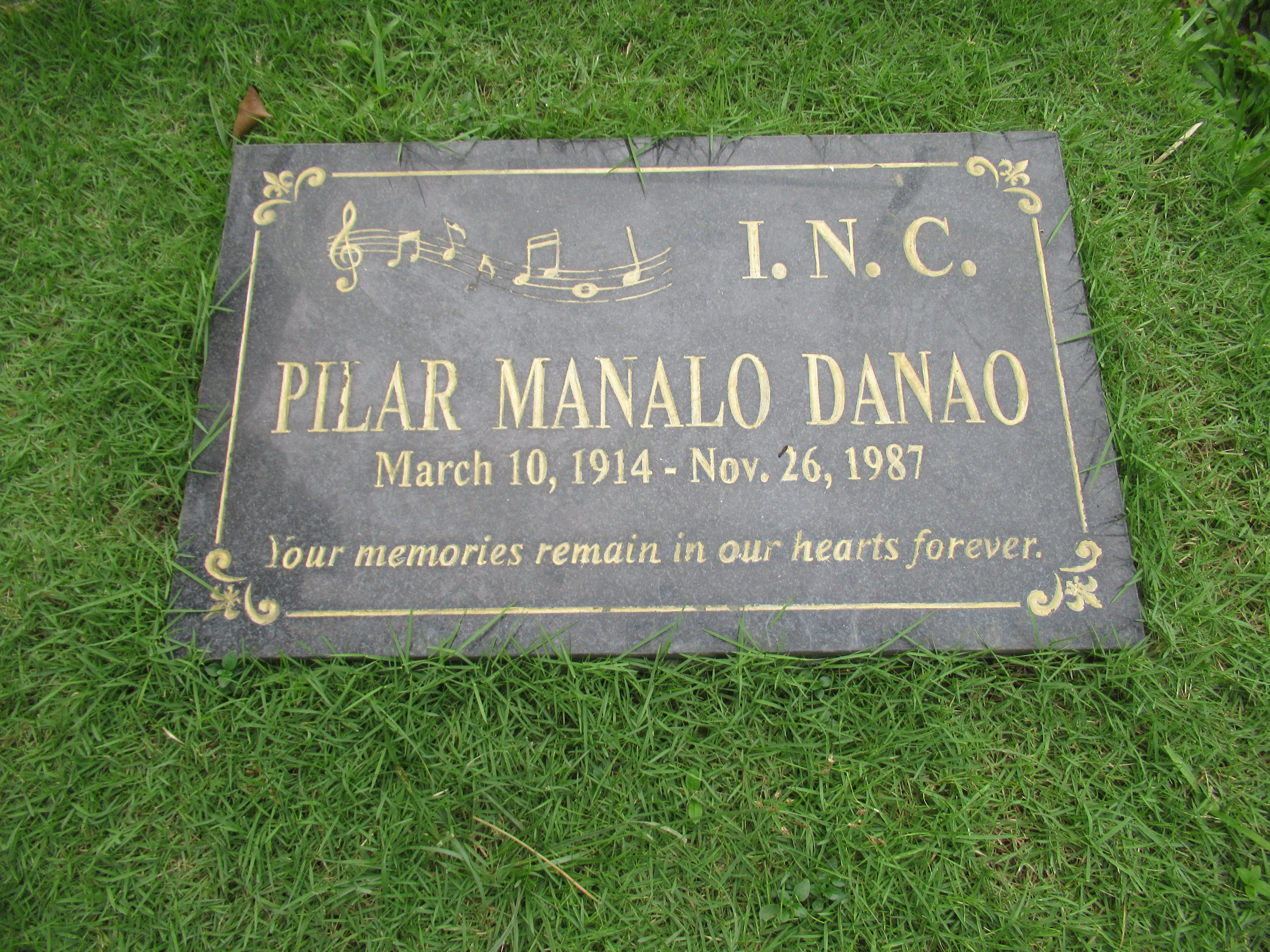
- Grave marker at Loyola Memorial Park, Marikina
- Title: Head Choir Director

Personal life
- Born: Pilar de Guzman Manalo; March 10, 1914 Punta, Santa Ana, Manila, Philippine Islands
- Died: November 26, 1987 (aged 73)
- Spouse: Artemio Danao
- Parents: Felix Manalo; Honorata de Guzman
- Other names: Ka Pilar, Manang, PMD

Religious life
- Religion: Iglesia ni Cristo

Senior posting
- Based in: San Juan, Philippines
- Period in office: 1942–1987
- Successor: Fausto T. Perez (as the Head Choir Director); Liberty Manalo-Albert (as the Choir Coordinator)

Pilar Manalo Danao (born Pilar de Guzman Manalo; March 10, 1914 – November 26, 1987) also known as Ka Pilar, Manang and PMD, was the eldest daughter of Felix Manalo and the first Head Choir Director of the Iglesia ni Cristo (INC) from 1942 until her death in 1987. She was instrumental in the creation of hymns for INC; she is the sole lyricist of the church’s Tagalog hymnal, Ang Himnario ng Iglesia ni Cristo. The hymnal originally contained 220 songs, and its first publication in 1937 bears her name and initials imprinted on hymnals (in Tagalog and English) and musical scores (Tagalog) for the choir.

Upon her death, Fausto Perez succeeded her as the Head Choir Director while Liberty Manalo-Albert took charge as the Coordinator of the choir to Executive Minister Eraño G. Manalo. Ramon C. Reyes and Gemma Manalo-de Guzman, daughter of current Executive Minister Eduardo V. Manalo, are the most recent to posts vacated by Perez (after his death) and Albert.

== Personal life ==
Pilar de Guzman Manalo was born on March 10, 1914, in Punta, Santa Ana, Manila to Honorata de Guzmán and Felix Manalo, who is regarded by the members of Iglesia ni Cristo as the Last Messenger of God in These Last Days, months before the beginning of the First World War coinciding with the registration of the Church to the Philippine Government. Her name, given by her father, literally means "pillar." Few months later, her father decided to move to Tipas, Taguig, Rizal to teach his newfound doctrines to hometown neighbors, where Pilar spent childhood with her younger sister.

Pilar had five siblings named Avelina, Dominador, Salvador, Eraño, and Bienvenido. Eraño assumed INC leadership after their father's death in 1963. She was married to Artemio Montes Danao, a dentist.

Pilar Manalo Danao is buried alongside her family members at the graves and two mausoleums at Loyola Memorial Park in Marikina.

== Religious career ==
Head Choir Director

In 1942, Felix Manalo consolidated all choir units under the post, Head Choir Director of the INC, given to her daughter, Pilar Manalo Danao. The post functions as overall head of the INC Music Department assigned to hymn line-ups for regular worship services and leading choristers, organists and all choir units. In the span of her leadership, she organized several classes for organists and for the choir.

== The Himnario ==
Ang Himnario ng Iglesia ni Cristo (The Hymnal of the Church of Christ) is the official hymnbook of INC, written in Tagalog by Danao and first published in 1937. The latest edition of the Himnario, published in 2016 with copyright, states: "Hymns underwent several changes from recent publications, by choir directors of the church, all of which were written by Sister Pilar Manalo Danao".

Danao also composed hymns for the Children's Worship Services (CWS) and were originally included in the main hymnal. In 1996, a separate hymnal was published for the CWS entitled Mga Awit Sa Pagsamba Ng Kabataan Ng IGLESIA NI CRISTO ("Hymns for the Children's Worship Services of the CHURCH OF CHRIST").

While Danao's hymns were all originally written in Tagalog, these have since been translated into other languages such as English, Spanish and Japanese, for use at worship services and other functions of the Church locally and abroad.

=== Content ===
The 2016 edition of the Himnario has 313 pieces. Aside from the said 313 hymns, also included in the hymnal is the Doxology (see below) and the Church's anthem, Ako'y Iglesia ni Cristo (I am a Member of the Church of Christ).

Hymns fall under several categories, such as the following examples:

- Hymns of praise to God Almighty (Hymn #61 Aleluya/Alleluia);
- Hymns to Jesus Christ (Hymn #131 Naririnig Kita, Jesus/Lord Jesus Christ, I Hear Your Voice);
- Hymns about the Church (Hymn #209 Ang Iglesia Ay Kaniya/The Church Belongs To God);
- Hymns about performing Church duties (Hymn #6 Nasa Tungkulin Ko Ang Aking Kaligtasan/My Salvation Rests In My Duty);
- Hymns about worship services (Hymn #263 Ang Pagsambang Iniaalay/This Worship That We Offer To You);
- Hymns about the Holy Land (Hymn #58 Ang Bagong Jerusalem/The New Jerusalem),
- Hymns about prayer (Hymn #22 Ang Aming Pagdaing/Our Fervent Prayers);
- Hymns for the Offering (Hymn #251 Ang Handog Ko Sa Diyos/My Offering To God);
- Recessional Hymns (Hymn #300 Muling Makikipagbaka/Once More We Will Fight For Our Faith), and
- Hymns about hymn singing (Hymn #1 Tayo'y Umawit Sa Ama/Let's Sing To Our Father)

==== Other hymns ====
Danao also made Special Hymns (called Mga Tanging Awit in Tagalog) for other church occasions and functions (i.e. the Anniversary and Year-End Thanksgiving for CWS and Regular Worship Services, Holy Supper, Baptism, Weddings and Evangelical Missions). These hymns were not specifically found in the hymnal but are performed by the choir, and were also updated in recent years.

Doxology

In the Iglesia ni Cristo, the Doxology is sung before the Benediction and Concluding Rites of the worship service. The original text reads:

Tagalog
"Ang Amá ay papurihan,
Anák, Espiritung mahal,
Ng mga taong nilalang,
At ng tanang sanlangitan.
Amen"

The revised text reads:

Tagalog	Official English version
"Purihin natin ang Amá;	"Praise God, our Father up above;
Mabuhay sa pag-ibig ng Anák;	Proclaim the love of His beloved Son;
Taglayín ang Espiritung Banál;	Receive the Holy Spirit's gift;
Ang Diyos ay lagi nating sambahin.	Forever worship our Almighty God.
Amen"	Amen"

== Commemoration ==
Pilar Manalo-Danao Multimedia Center

The infrastructure commemorating the late Pilar Manalo Danao was inaugurated on March 10, 2014, coinciding the latter's 100th birth anniversary, by the current Executive Minister of the Iglesia ni Cristo, Brother Eduardo V. Manalo. It was part of Centennial projects of the Church, which includes Philippine Arena, Philippine Sports Stadium, Honorata de Guzman-Manalo Building, Eraño G. Manalo Medical Center, Philippine Sports Center and New Era University Bocaue Campus .

The building is located at the INC Central Complex in Quezon City, comprising about 9,500 square meters (102,000 sq ft). Classically designed but with a modern approach, the sunny-yellow infrastructure has eight levels. It consists of two basements, six upper floors and a roof deck. It has 200 rooms, serves as designated office for choir directors, songwriters and all those who part in the artistic works of the church.

== In popular culture ==
In the epic and biographical film Felix Manalo, Pilar is portrayed by Filipino actresses Snooky Serna and Carla Humphries, respectively.

== Ancestry ==
Ancestors of Pilar Manalo Danao

16. Ygnacio Ysagun
8. Salvador Ysagun
17. Maria de la Cruz
4. Mariano Ysagun
9. Teresa Villanueva
2. Felix Manalo
20. Manuel Manalo
10. Andres Manalo
21. Candida Torres
5. Bonifacia Manalo
11. Maria Cruz
1. Pilar Manalo
12. Arsenio de Guzman
6. Rosendo de Guzman
3. Honorata de Guzman
