= Tenny Manalo =

Widow of the late INC head Eraño Manalo

Personal life
- Born: Cristina Arámbulo Villanueva; February 2, 1937 (age 89) Ermita, Manila, Philippine Commonwealth
- Spouse: Eraño G. Manalo (m. 1955; died 2009)
- Children: 6 (including Eduardo)
- Parents: Jacinto Mercado Villanueva; Asunción Alipon Arámbulo

Religious life
- Religion: Iglesia ni Cristo (expelled)

Cristina Arámbulo Villanueva-Manalo (born February 1, 1937), popularly known as Ka Tenny Manalo, is the widow of former Iglesia ni Cristo (INC) executive minister Eraño G. Manalo. She stood beside her husband who led the church for over 46 years, from the death of Felix Manalo in 1963 and until the latter's death in 2009. Her eldest son, Eduardo V. Manalo, who was at the time deputy executive minister, assumed the post seven days after his predecessor's demise.

In the midst of the INC leadership controversy in 2015, Tenny was excommunicated (expelled). It was announced through circulars on regular worship services of July 23 to 25, signed by INC Secretary-General Radel G. Cortez with the approval of Executive Minister Eduardo Manalo. Lolita "Lottie" Manalo-Hemedez, Felix Nathaniel "Angel" Manalo II and Marco Eraño Manalo were also expelled on the grounds of violating the doctrine on unity, INC's 22nd principal doctrine.

== Early life ==
Cristina Arámbulo Villanueva was born at 2:45 PM of February 1, 1937, at Philippine General Hospital in Ermita, Manila, Philippines. She is the seventh child of Jacinto Mercado Villanueva (August 16, 1904 – December 25, 1970) of Pasay and Asunción Arámbulo y Alipon (August 15, 1895 – ?) of Santa Rosa, Laguna. Her parents were Aglipayans, members of the Philippine Independent Church. On January 17, 1955, at age of 17, she married the 30-year-old Eraño "Erdy" Manalo, who was almost two years on his term as the heir to succeed his father, being the deputy executive minister elected by the INC Administrative Council.

== Family ==
She conceived six children named Eduardo, Lolita, Erlinda, Liberty, Felix Nathaniel II and Marco Eraño. Her eldest, Eduardo, followed his father's path as the leader of the church and was married to Babylyn Ventura. Lolita or "Lottie", her second child, lived in private with husband Eduard Hemedez. Her third child, Erlinda or "Eileen", became a fellow wife of an evangelist when she married Romualdo Alcantara, the current assistant director of the New Era University College of Evangelical Ministry. Her fourth child, Liberty or "Beth", followed the footsteps of aunt Pilar Manalo Danao, when she took a major in Music and graduated at the University of the Philippines College of Music. Beth became part of the UP Singing Ambassadors, where she met her future husband Albert Albert, a relative to singer Joey Albert. Her fifth and sixth child, sons Felix Nathaniel II or "Angel" and Marco Eraño or "Marc", on the other hand, became co-evangelical ministers of their elder brother.

== Reputation ==
Eraño established an ideal family, inspirational to church members on his 46 years of leadership. Tenny enjoyed her status as the so-called "first lady" for almost five decades. Unlike being a first lady of the head of state, the wife of the Executive Minister does not earn religious responsibilities for the church administration, instead her role is exclusive within her own family like what an ordinary wife and mother is, to her husband and children.

== Expulsion and controversy ==
In July 2015, INC celebrated its 101st anniversary with a dispute between the INC Administrative Council and some members of the Manalo family including member critics and ministers, particularly Isaias Samson Jr. et al. A YouTube video was released few days before the nearing celebration, with Tenny and Angel Manalo pleading for help, Iglesia ni Cristo will not involve theirselves in any communication of law, they believe that they can stood theirselves and protect theirselves. We can say that they are in danger, They need an important evidence and actual footage to prove that this is true. Tenny also mentioned her daughter Lottie's security and begged prayers for the group of ten ministers presumed abducted and tortured. This information was earlier issued on the blog Iglesia Ni Cristo Silent No More under whistleblower, pseudonym Antonio Ramirez Ebangelista. A day after the release of the video, Tenny, Lottie, Angel and Marc were expelled from the church, announced through circulars on the mid-week worship services, on grounds of creating divisions in the church.

== Film portrayal ==
Tenny Manalo is portrayed in the 2015 epic and biographical film Felix Manalo by actress Heart Evangelista.
