= Jovita Varias De Guzman =

Filipino academic

Jovita Romeroso Varias-De Guzman (15 February 1923 - 7 March 2016) was a Filipino female educator, researcher, editor and writer of scholarly books. She is deemed as the first Filipino who wrote academic studies about the psychology of the Filipinos, published in her book "Psychology of the Filipinos: Studies and Essays" c.1967 (co-authored by her younger brother, Rodolfo Varias, MD). Her other notable work was "Women of Distinction: Biographical Essays on Outstanding Filipino Women of the Past and the Present" c.1967. The latter book has been widely used as a research reference book on Filipino female empowerment as it was the first of its kind to compile and showcase Filipino female achievers in the past. Mrs. De Guzman is also one of the first Filipino female awarded a Fulbright Scholarship.

== Biography ==
Mrs. Varias-De Guzman was born in Alfonso, Cavite, Philippines on February 15, 1923, to Ignacio Varias and Aurea Romeroso. She is the 6th of 8 children. She obtained her Bachelor of Science in Education cum laude from Far Eastern University - College of Education in 19??. She was awarded a Fulbright scholarship to the Kentucky State Teachers College in Richmond, Kentucky, U.S.A., where she obtained her Master of Arts degree in education in 1949, and was one of the first Filipino females to achieve this in the post-Philippine Commonwealth era.

Before returning to the Philippines, she took additional courses on Psychology at Columbia University and New York University.

Mrs. De Guzman was an associate professor of psychology and education in the College of Education of the University of the East in the 1950s and 60s. She also taught at Feati University and Arellano University in Manila.

She was the first female president of the University of the East - College of Education Faculty Club for two consecutive terms and was the President of the Philippine Association of University Women (PAUW) U.E. Chapter and the Makati Ladies Civic Circle (now defunct). She has contributed numerous articles to the U.E. College of Education Journal, the PAUW Journal, the Variety Magazine and other publications.

In 1960, she married Leonardo C. De Guzman († 2008), a journalist who worked for the Manila Times. They have two children, Jewel and Jovita Joy.

In the early 1970s, Mrs. De Guzman was instrumental in the establishment and organisation of the New Era Educational Institute (now New Era University) in Echague, Quiapo, Manila. When the institute was renamed New Era College and transferred to Quezon City, she later became the Dean of Academic Affairs and the Head of the Guidance Center of the said institution until her retirement.

Despite her retirement, she continued to be an active educator. She established a day-care center for the children of NEU employees, and continued writing articles for the NEU Guidance Center Journal "Mind and Ways".

Mrs. De Guzman died of natural causes on 7 March 2016, aged 93, at her home in Makati, Metro Manila, Philippines.

== Works ==
- Psychology of Filipinos: Studies and essays, 1967.
- Women of distinction; biographical essays on outstanding Filipino women of the past and the present, 1967.
- Understanding ourselves: (articles on psychology and mental health), 1967.
- Notes on Child Psychology, 1968.
