= Eraño Manalo =

Filipino religious minister (1925–2009)

Eraño G. Manalo
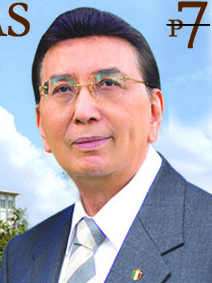
- Manalo on a 2010 stamp of the Philippines

2nd Executive Minister of the Iglesia ni Cristo
- In office April 23, 1963 – August 31, 2009
- Preceded by: Felix Manalo
- Succeeded by: Eduardo V. Manalo

Personal life
- Born: Eraño de Guzman Manalo; January 2, 1925 New Manila, San Juan, Rizal, Philippine Islands
- Died: August 31, 2009 (aged 84) Quezon City, Philippines
- Resting place: Iglesia Ni Cristo Central Complex
- Spouse: Cristina Villanueva (m. 1955)
- Children: Eduardo; Lolita; Erlinda; Liberty; Felix Nathaniel II; Marco Eraño
- Parents: Felix Manalo; Honorata de Guzman
- Other name: Ka Erdy

Religious life
- Religion: Filipino Protestantism (Note: Iglesia Ni Cristo (INC) would not appear as a separate denomination until the 1948 Philippine census.)
- Church: Iglesia ni Cristo
- Ordination: May 10, 1947 at Locale Congregation of Tayuman (Manila)

Senior posting
- Based in: INC Central Office Complex, Quezon City, Philippines
- Period in office: April 23, 1963 – August 31, 2009 (46 years, 4 months, 8 days)
- Predecessor: Felix Manalo
- Successor: Eduardo V. Manalo
- Previous post: Deputy Executive Minister; General Treasurer; District Minister of Manila; Resident Minister

Eraño de Guzman Manalo (Tagalog pronunciation: [ʔɛˈɾaɲo mɐˈnalɔ]; January 2, 1925 – August 31, 2009), also known as Ka Erdy, was a Filipino minister and preacher who served as the second Executive Minister of the Iglesia ni Cristo (INC) from April 19, 1963, until August 31, 2009. He took over the administration of the church after the death of his father, Felix Manalo, in 1963. (Note: According to INC doctrine, God's four messengers in the church era are Jesus Christ, Paul the Apostle, Martin Luther, and Felix Manalo.) He was instrumental in the propagation and expansion of the church internationally.

== Biography ==
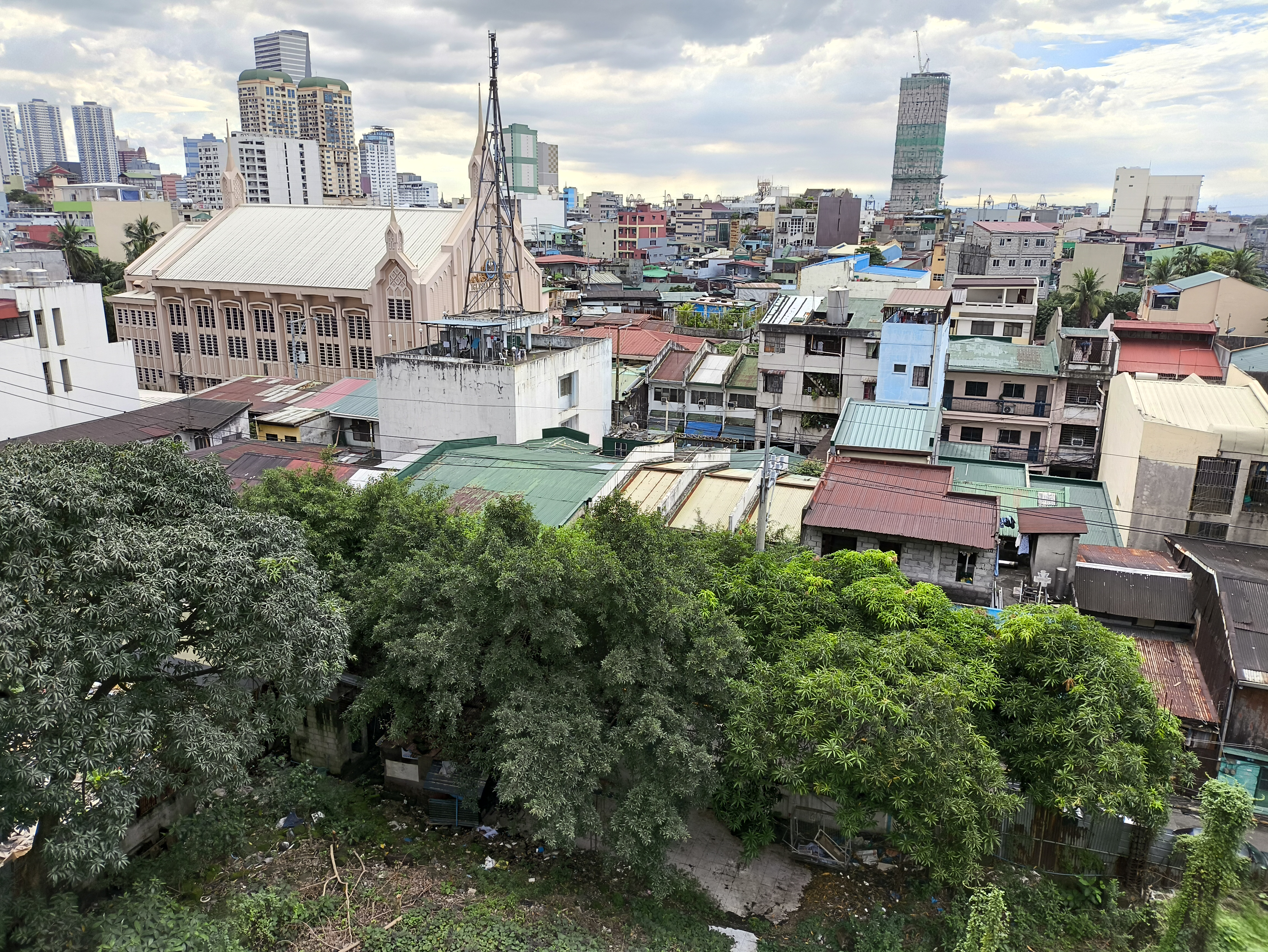
The Iglesia Ni Cristo (INC) Lokal ng Tayuman is the second oldest congregation of the church, established on November 6, 1915, after the congregation at Punta in Santa Ana, Manila. The chapel was also the site of Eraño Manalo's ordination in 1947. Manila City Resolution No. 431, series of 2015 urged the National Historical Commission of the Philippines to recognize the locale as a historic site.

Eraño G. Manalo was born at their residence at No. 42 Broadway Avenue, New Manila, San Juan, Rizal (now part of Quezon City) on January 2, 1925. He was the fourth child of Felix Manalo and Honorata de Guzman. His name came from a reversal and elision of the term "New Era", which his father used to describe what he felt was "a new Christian era" as the Iglesia ni Cristo was established. His older siblings were Sisters Pilar and Avelina, and Brothers Dominador and Salvador. His youngest sibling is Brother Bienvenido ("Bien"), a former racing driver who is currently the head of INC's Engineering and Construction Department.

Eraño completed his elementary education at St. John's Academy in San Juan, Metro Manila, starting at the age of six.

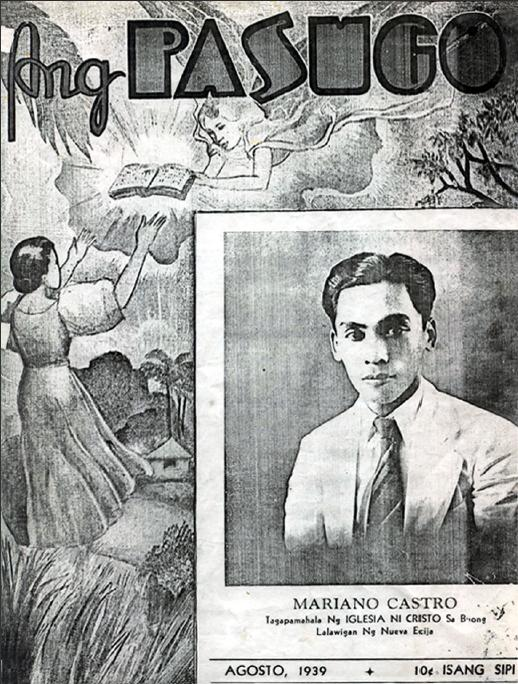
Cover of the August 1939 issue of the Pasugo featuring an artist's depiction of the "angel from the East", and a photograph of INC Minister Mariano Castro, who later served as a religious mentor to Manalo.

Manalo initially took up law school, but left his studies to become a minister of the INC. He started attending the church's ministerial classes at the age of 16 and was ordained as a minister on May 10, 1947, in the INC Locale (Congregation) of Tayuman, Ecclesiastical District of Manila, at the age of 22. He held various positions in the church including being the General Treasurer of the INC and circulation manager of the Pasugo magazine (now known as Pasugo: God's Message). During this time, he wrote a 64-page booklet entitled Christ-God: Investigated-False.

On January 17, 1955, Eraño Manalo married Cristina Villanueva, with whom he has six children (Eduardo Manalo, Lolita Manalo-Hemedez, Erlinda Manalo-Alcantara, Liberty Manalo-Albert, Felix Nathaniel Manalo II and Marco Eraño Manalo). On February 18, 1953, ten years before his father's death, he was elected successor to his father as Executive Minister. Following Eraño's death, his son Eduardo then assumed the role of INC's Executive Minister.

== Administration ==
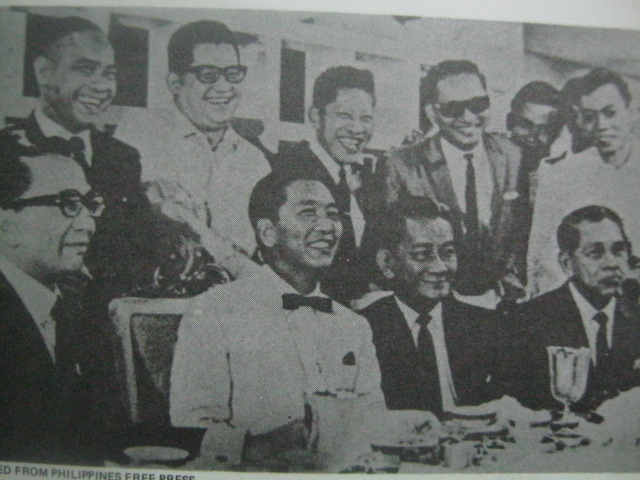
President Ferdinand Marcos and some Philippine senators (namely Sergio Osmeña, Jr., Arturo Tolentino, Benigno Aquino, Jr., and Jose Roy) during a birthday celebration of Executive Minister Eraño Manalo.

With the death of Felix Manalo on April 12, 1963, Iglesia's critics predicted the church's decline and eventual fall. To them, the church's popularity was due mainly to the charisma and leadership of Felix Manalo. Barely a month after assuming his role as spiritual leader of the church, the young Manalo began visiting congregations nationwide. At every location he visited, he officiated worship services and staged massive religious rallies in public plazas. During this period of transition in what critics thought was the most vulnerable period of the church, Manalo further consolidated the gains of the church.

In 1947, Manalo became the General Treasurer of the church. He was later elected as successor to Felix Manalo by provincial ministers as early as 1953. In 1957 he became the District Minister of Manila. Very few people outside of the church gave Manalo's leadership potential enough credit. He would later initiate significant moves that would make the church to what it is today.

Manalo demonstrated the church responsiveness to the needs of the poor. Even before the government initiated agrarian reforms, Manalo established model land reforms. In 1965, the first of the resettlement farms was Maligaya farm in Palayan City, Nueva Ecija, Philippines. Similar projects were established in Cavite, Rizal and other provinces.

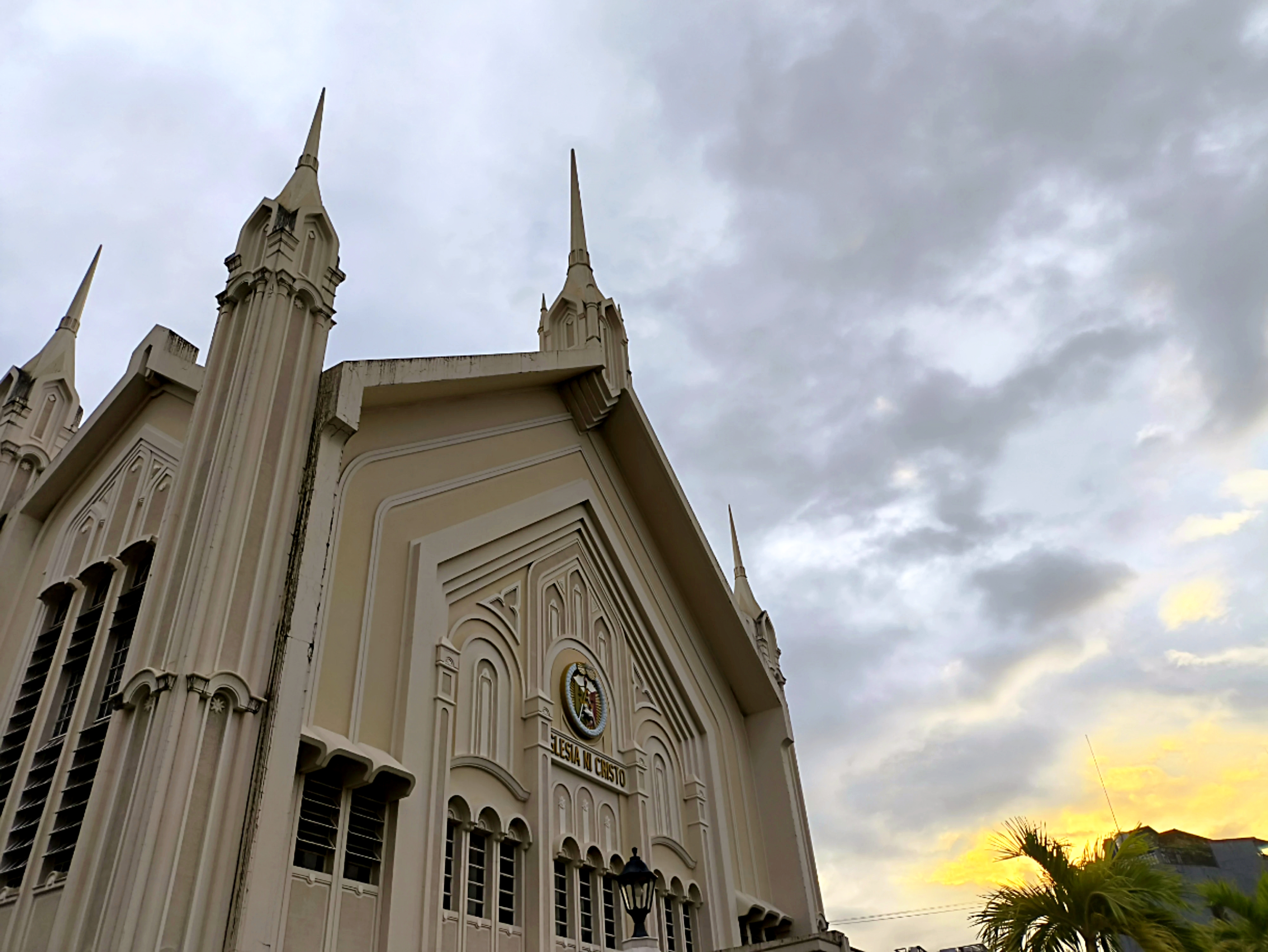
The INC Lokal ng Palanan, formerly known as the INC Lokal ng Makati, was formed as a congregation in 1955 by members from INC locales in Pasay and Manila. After being destroyed by fire, the current structure was rehabilitated and rededicated in 2011, becoming one of the first edifices in the Philippines to exhibit the modern architectural design of INC chapels.

As early as 1967, four years after assuming leadership role, Manalo set his vision to overseas mission and global expansion. The first overseas INC mission was sent in 1968 on its 54th anniversary. On July 27, 1968, Executive Minister Eraño G. Manalo, officiated at the first worship service of the church outside the Philippines. This gathering held in Ewa Beach, Honolulu, Hawaii marked the establishment of the Honolulu congregation, the first overseas mission of the church. The following month, the Executive Minister was in California to establish the San Francisco congregation and lead its inaugural worship service. In 1971, the church set foot in Canada. In June 1987, the US Main Office (USMO) was set up in Daly City, California to assist the INC central administration in supervising the then 11 districts of the church in the West. The first local congregation in Latin America was established in Guantánamo Bay, Cuba in 1990. The following year, the church reached Mexico and Aruba. From 2000 and beyond, congregations rose in the Central and South American countries. The first local congregation in Europe was established in England in 1972. The church came to Germany and Switzerland in the mid-70s. By the end of the 1980s, congregations and missions could be found in the Scandinavian countries and their neighbors. The Rome, Italy congregation was established on July 27, 1994; the Jerusalem, Israel congregation on March 31, 1996; and the Athens, Greece congregation on May 10, 1997. The predecessors (prayer groups) of these full-fledged congregations began two decades earlier. Meanwhile, the mission first reached Spain in 1979. The first mission in northern Africa opened in Nigeria in October 1978. After a month, the King William's Town congregation, in South Africa was established. A congregation was organised in Guam in 1969. In Australia, congregations have been established since mid-1970s. The church first reached China by way of Hong Kong, and Japan through Tokyo also in the 1970s. Missions have also opened in Kazakh SSR (now Kazakhstan) and Sakhalin Island in Russian SFSR (now Russia). In Southeast Asia, the first congregation in Thailand was established in 1976 and missions have already been conducted in Brunei since 1979. In addition, there are also congregations in Vietnam, Indonesia, Singapore, and Malaysia.

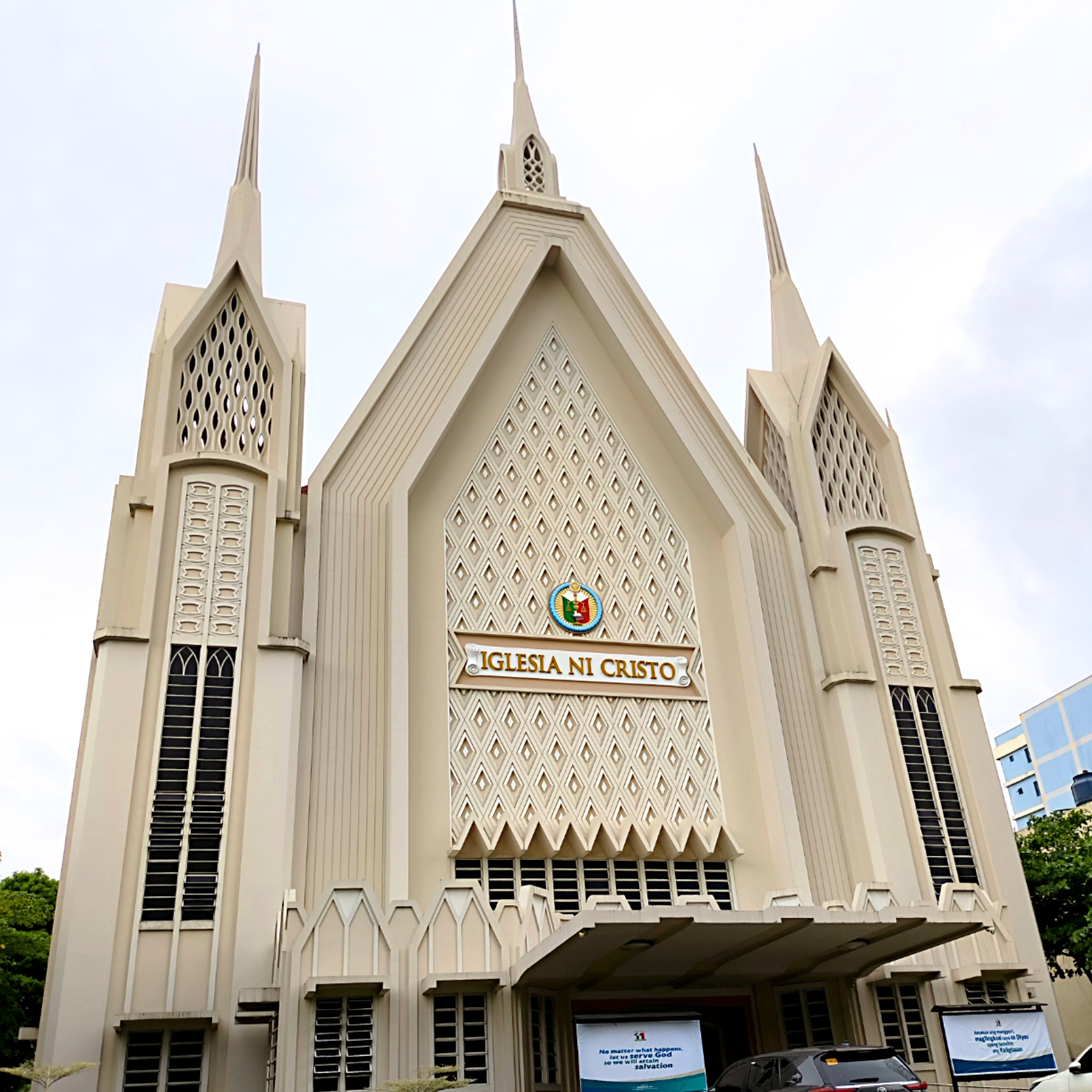
The INC Lokal ng Bago Bantay, completed on December 4, 1964, is currently the only INC chapel located along EDSA, a major thoroughfare in the Philippines.

The INC started operating a radio station in 1969. While its first television program aired in 1983. The Ministerial Institute of Development, currently the New Era University College of Evangelical Ministry (later called as Iglesia ni Cristo School for Ministers), was founded in 1974 in Quiapo, Manila. It moved to its current location in Quezon City in 1978. As of 1995, it had 4,500 students and five extension schools in Bulacan, Cavite, Laguna, Pampanga and Rizal. In 1965, INC launched its first resettlement and land reform program in Barrio Maligaya, Laur, Nueva Ecija. In 1971, the INC Central Office building was built in Quezon City. Thirteen years later, the 7,000-seater Central Temple was added in the complex. The Tabernacle, a tent-like multipurpose building which can accommodate up to 4,000 persons, was finished in 1989. The complex also includes the New Era University, a higher-education institution run by the INC.

== Death ==
INC spokesperson and General Evangelist, Bienvenido C. Santiago Sr, confirmed Manalo's death in an announcement delivered in Filipino/Tagalog over various radio and television stations including Net 25 (along with sister station DZEC-AM), translated below:

It is with deep regret and sorrow that I inform the entire membership of the Iglesia Ni Cristo and the nation that our beloved leader, our Executive Minister, Brother Eranio G. Manalo passed away at his home at 3.53 p.m. yesterday, August 31, 2009, at the age of 84. According to his personal physician, Dr. Ray Melchor Santos, the immediate cause of his death is cardiopulmonary arrest. His remains now lies in state at the Iglesia Ni Cristo Central Temple in Quezon City. We shall announce the date of his burial later. We request the ministers and evangelical workers, church officers, and members of the Iglesia Ni Cristo to pray to God for his continued guidance for the whole church and to give us strength to enable us to bear this terrible loss and grief.

Santiago also stated that according to Dr. Ray Melchor Santos, Manalo died due to cardiopulmonary arrest. On Monday September 7, 2009, the remains of Manalo were temporarily interred at the INC Tabernacle at 12:00 PST while his mausoleum is being built near the memorial statue of his father, Felix Y. Manalo at INC Central Office Complex. President Gloria Macapagal Arroyo declared September 7 a national day of mourning.

== Recognition ==
The Central Temple in Quezon City was completed in 1984, and is the only INC building to date that is called a temple (that is, Templo Central). According to Architect Carlos A. Santos-Viola, in designing INC edifices, he had to create a style that "cannot be mistaken for any other sect except Iglesia." He also related how Felix Manalo considered the Gothic architecture as the "most religious type of architecture" for its verticality, which was interpreted as "pointing towards heaven."

The Quezon City government renamed what was Central Avenue to Eraño G. Manalo Avenue. Ordinance number SP-1961 S-2009 the Quezon City Council stated the renaming was to is recognition of "“his greatness and nobility" in leading the powerful religious group." Other roads named after him include Eraño Manalo Street in Manila (vicinity of INC Lokal ng Tayuman), and Eraño G. Manalo Street in Marikina (formerly Paliparan).

On April 13, 2010, The Philippine Postal Corporation announced that it will issue a limited edition postage stamp in his honour. The stamp will be released on April 23 with 100,000 pieces with a denomination of P 7.00.

== Media portrayal ==
- Portrayed by AJ Muhlach and Gabby Concepcion in the 2015 film, Felix Manalo.

== Family tree ==
Manuel Manalo	Candida Torres
Maria Cruz	Andres Manalo
Bonifacia Manalo
Tomasa Sereneo (d. 1912)	Felix Manalo (1886–1963)	Honorata de Guzman
Gerardo Manalo (1912)	Pilar Manalo-Danao (1914–1987)	Avelina Manalo-Makapugay	Dominador Manalo	Salvador Manalo	Eraño Manalo (1925–2009)	Cristina Villanueva (b. 1937)	Bienvenido Manalo (b. 1935)
Lynn Ventura	Eduardo Manalo (b. 1955)	Lolita Manalo-Hemedez	Erlinda Manalo-Alcantara	Liberty Manalo-Albert	Felix Nathaniel Manalo II	Marco Eraño Manalo
Dorothy Kristine Manalo-Orasa	Gemma Minna Manalo-de Guzman	Angelo Eraño Manalo

== Notes ==
Religious titles
Preceded by Felix Manalo	Executive Minister of Iglesia ni Cristo; 1963–2009	Succeeded by Eduardo Manalo
