= Dale Baldillo =

Filipino child actor and model (born 2000)

- Born: Dale Baldillo; October 6, 2000 (age 25); Manila, Philippines
- Occupation: Actor commercial model
- Years active: 2005–2016; 2024–present
- Agent: Star Magic (2011–2016)
- Known for: Budoy, Omar, and Glen

Dale Baldillo (born October 6, 2000) is a Filipino actor who is known for his roles in Annaliza and Budoy.

== Career ==
Baldillo was born on October 6, 2000, and raised in Manila, Philippines. He began modelling at age 10 for apparel brands before appearing on Philippine television. He first appeared in various commercials in 2009 at age 7. He then auditioned for several television series. He first starred in the fantasy drama Wansapanataym in the episode "Gising Na Omar".

In 2011, Baldillo was cast in the prime time drama television series, Budoy, as the young Budoy.

His first notable acting role was in a supporting role in the remake of Annaliza in 2013, playing the best friend of the lead character Annaliza. He also appeared in the pilot episodes of ABS-CBN's prime time television series Bukas Na lang Kitang Mamahalin.

== Filmography ==
=== Television ===
Year	Title	Role
2010	Wansapanataym: Gising Na, Omar	Omar
2011	Budoy	Young Budoy
2013	Annaliza	Glenn Gomez
2013	Bukas Na Lang Kita Mamahalin	Young Miguel Dizon
2014	Wansapanataym: My Guardian Angel	Ivan

=== Film ===
Year	Title	Role
2015	Felix Manalo	Young Eduardo V. Manalo
