= Iglesia ni Cristo chapel, Bago Bantay =

Iglesia ni Cristo Chapel Bago Bantay
- Lokal ng Bago Bantay (Filipino)
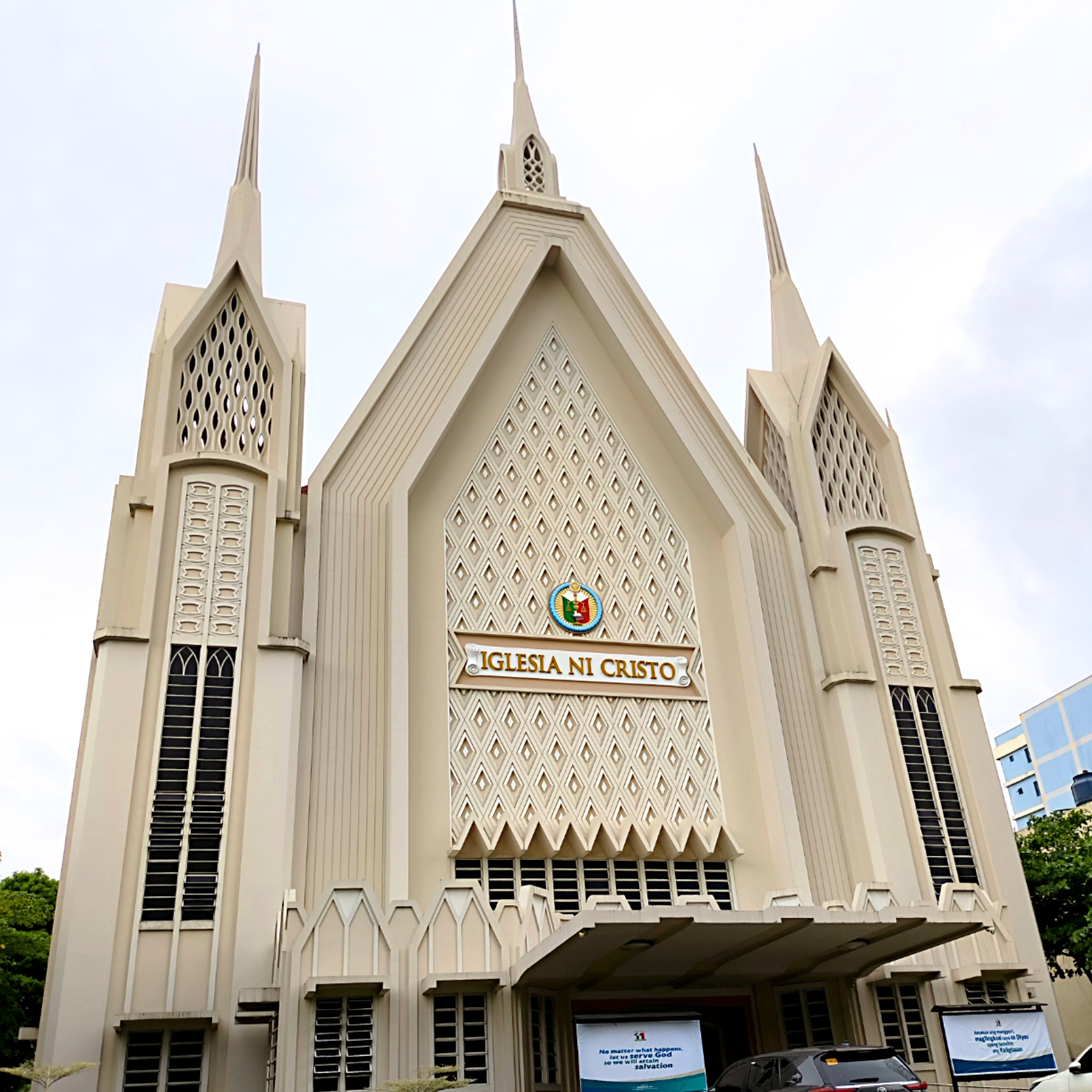
- Iglesia ni Cristo Chapel Bago Bantay
- 14°39′29″N 121°01′20″E
- Location: Epifanio delos Santos Avenue, Brgy. Ramon Magsaysay, Bago Bantay, Quezon City
- Country: Philippines
- Denomination: Iglesia ni Cristo

History
- Status: Locale Congregation
- Dedicated: July 18, 2016; 10 years ago (Rededication)

Architecture
- Functional status: active
- Architect: Carlos A. Santos-Viola
- Completed: December 4, 1964; 61 years ago

Specifications
- Capacity: 2,500

Administration
- District: Central
- Metropolis: Metro Manila

The Iglesia Ni Cristo Locale of Bago Bantay (Filipino: Lokal ng Bago Bantay) is a chapel of the Philippine-based Christian sect Iglesia ni Cristo. Located along Epifanio delos Santos Avenue (EDSA), Bago Bantay, Quezon City, it was completed on December 4, 1964, and was the third chapel dedicated by Executive Minister Eraño G. Manalo. It is currently the only INC chapel located along EDSA.

Designed by architect Carlos A. Santos-Viola and based on the last design conceptualized by Manalo himself, the chapel was the first to be built with a steep gable and an arcaded side facade. It is the second-largest chapel ever built during its time. Its interiors feature the widest nave built during its time and also one of the highest in terms of floor to ceiling height. The overall design was inspired by the Gothic cathedrals of Europe, particularly San Sebastian Church in Manila.

After the ceiling collapsed in July 2015, the chapel underwent an extensive renovation and was rededicated on July 18, 2016. The interior now features a new design which uses Narra wood panels. The tiles were replaced by high-gloss granite tiles. The choir loft was fitted with digital pipe organ speakers. Finally, the exterior was restored to its original color scheme.
