= Arámbula =

Arámbula is a Basque surname. Notable people with the surname include:

- Antonio Arámbula López (born 1968), Mexican politician
- Aracely Arámbula (born 1975), Mexican actress, model, singer, television personality, and entrepreneur
- José Doroteo Arango Arámbula (1878–1923), general in the Mexican Revolution
- Joaquin Arambula (born 1977), American politician
- Juan Arambula (born 1952), American assemblyman
- Román Arámbula (1936–2020), Mexican comic strip artist and animator
- Ryan Arambula (born 1993), American soccer player

== See also ==
- Arámbulo
