= Iglesia ni Cristo chapel, Makati =

Church in Makati, Philippines

Iglesia ni Cristo Palanan Locale
- Lokal ng Palanan (Filipino)
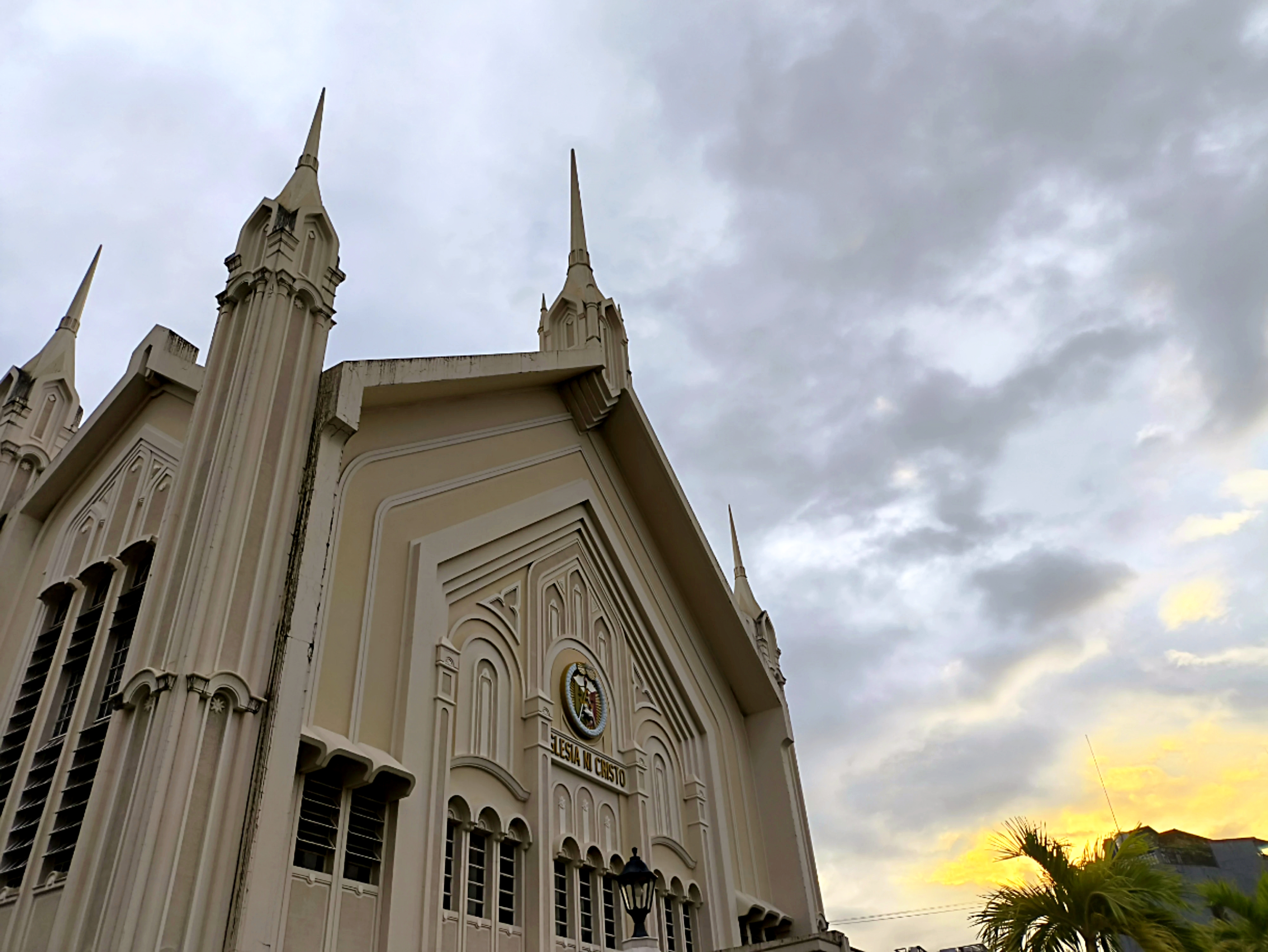
- Iglesia ni Cristo Palanan Locale
- 14°33′39″N 121°00′04″E
- Location: Bautista Street cor. Arellano Avenue, Palanan, Makati, Metro Manila
- Country: Philippines
- Denomination: Iglesia ni Cristo

History
- Status: Locale Congregation
- Dedicated: August 17, 1977; 48 years ago; Redicated: 2011; 15 years ago

Architecture
- Functional status: active
- Architect: Carlos A. Santos-Viola
- Completed: August 17, 1977; 48 years ago

Specifications
- Capacity: 1000

The Iglesia Ni Cristo Locale of Palanan (Filipino: Lokal ng Palanan), formerly Locale of Makati is a chapel of the Philippine-based Christian church, the Iglesia ni Cristo. Located at Barangay Palanan, Makati, Metro Manila, it was completed on 1977 to become a separate congregation from Paco Locale in Paco, Manila and nearby Proprietarios congregation in Pasay. It was designed by architect, Carlos A. Santos-Viola with seating capacity of 1000.

After a destructive fire that hit the chapel and its compound in 2011, the Church Administration decided to remodel and renovate the burned chapel, also it is one of the first chapels of the Church, that is renovated to the modern standards of INC Construction and Engineering Department. The chapel was rededicated 10 months after the fire, the seating capacity also expanded by 200 worshipers, in addition to original 800 seating capacity. It was dedicated by Brother Israel U. Flores, who was then the District Supervising Minister of Metro Manila South.
