= Tomasa Manalo =

First wife of Felix Manalo

Personal life
- Born: Tomasa Sereneo Paco, Manila, Philippines
- Died: 1912
- Spouse: Felix Manalo (m. 1910)
- Children: 1

Religious life
- Religion: Seventh-day Adventist

Tomasa Sereneo-Manalo was the first wife of Felix Manalo, the first Executive Minister of the Iglesia ni Cristo and regarded by the members of the church as the Last Messenger of God.

In 1910, she married Manalo. They joined Christian Mission or Disciples of Christ and later became active members of the Seventh-day Adventist Church. Their son died at infancy. Between years 1911 and 1912, she died of infectious tuberculosis.

Tomasa is portrayed on the 2015 epic-biographical film Felix Manalo by the Filipina actress Arci Muñoz.
