= New Era University =

Private university in Quezon City, Philippines

- University seal
- Former names: New Era Educational Institute (1975–1981); New Era College (1981–1995)
- Motto: Godliness is the foundation of knowledge.
- Type: Private higher education institution
- Established: June 17, 1975; 51 years ago
- Religious affiliation: Iglesia ni Cristo although non-sectarian in governance
- Academic affiliations: PACUCOA, LEB, and ACSCU-ACI.
- Chairman: Alberto R. Domingo Jr.
- President: Alberto R. Domingo Jr.
- Vice-president: Isaias B. Reyes II (Administration); Julian J. Meimban III (Research); Simonnette B. Leoncio (Academic Affairs)
- Students: 30,000+
- Location: No. 9 Central Avenue, New Era, Quezon City, Philippines; 14°39′49.82″N 121°3′29.24″E
- Campus: Main New Era, Quezon City Branches; NEU – Pampanga (City of San Fernando, Pampanga); NEU – Lipa City Branch (Lipa City, Batangas); NEU – General Santos Branch (General Santos); NEU – Rizal Branch (Baras, Rizal)
- Colors: Green - White - Red
- Nickname: Hunters
- Sporting affiliations: NAASCU
- Website: www.neu.edu.ph
- Location in Metro Manila Location in Luzon Location in the Philippines

New Era University (NEU) is a private educational institution in the Philippines, run by the Iglesia ni Cristo (INC). Although it is associated with the INC, it is a non-sectarian university. Its main campus is at New Era, Quezon City, within the Central Office Complex of the INC, since 1986. Aside from its flagship Quezon City campus, it has four other campuses around the Philippines, including one in San Fernando City (Pampanga), in Lipa City (Batangas), in General Santos, and in Baras (Rizal).

Founded on June 17, 1975, it was known as the New Era Educational Institute, and was located along Echague Street (now Carlos Palanca Street), Quiapo, Manila. It initially offered only secondary education (high school) but later expanded in 1977 to serve technical and vocational courses under its Center for Livelihood and Skills Training (CLST). It also offers graduate programs.

In 1981, it was renamed New Era College after the Ministry of Education, Culture and Sports (MECS) granted collegiate status, and later in June 1995, to its present name, New Era University, when the Commission on Higher Education (CHED) granted university status.

It is run by the INC for the educational needs of INC members, although it accepts enrollments from non-INC members as well. Formerly, under the university umbrella, it ran the College of Evangelical Ministry (now Iglesia Ni Cristo (Church of Christ) School for Ministers), where the Church teaches its male members to become ministers.

Other colleges include College of Engineering and Technology, College of Nursing, College of Business Administration, College of Arts and Sciences, College of Education, College of Music, College of Law, College of Computer Studies, College of Accountancy, School of Graduate Studies, and the then new College of Communication, College of Medicine, and Center for Medical and Health Allied Sciences. It offers new courses in the Philippines, including BS Real Estate Management and BS Criminology.

NEU is the legal owner of the Philippine Arena, which is the largest indoor arena in the world with a seating capacity of over 50,000.

It annually hosts its graduation ceremonies at the Philippine Arena in Ciudad de Victoria, which is being developed because there is a proposal to move the main campus of NEU to this location.

== Integrated School ==
Founded in 2014, New Era University also provides K-12 education through its New Era University Integrated School (NEUIS).

== Networks ==
Seal of the New Era University – General Santos Branch

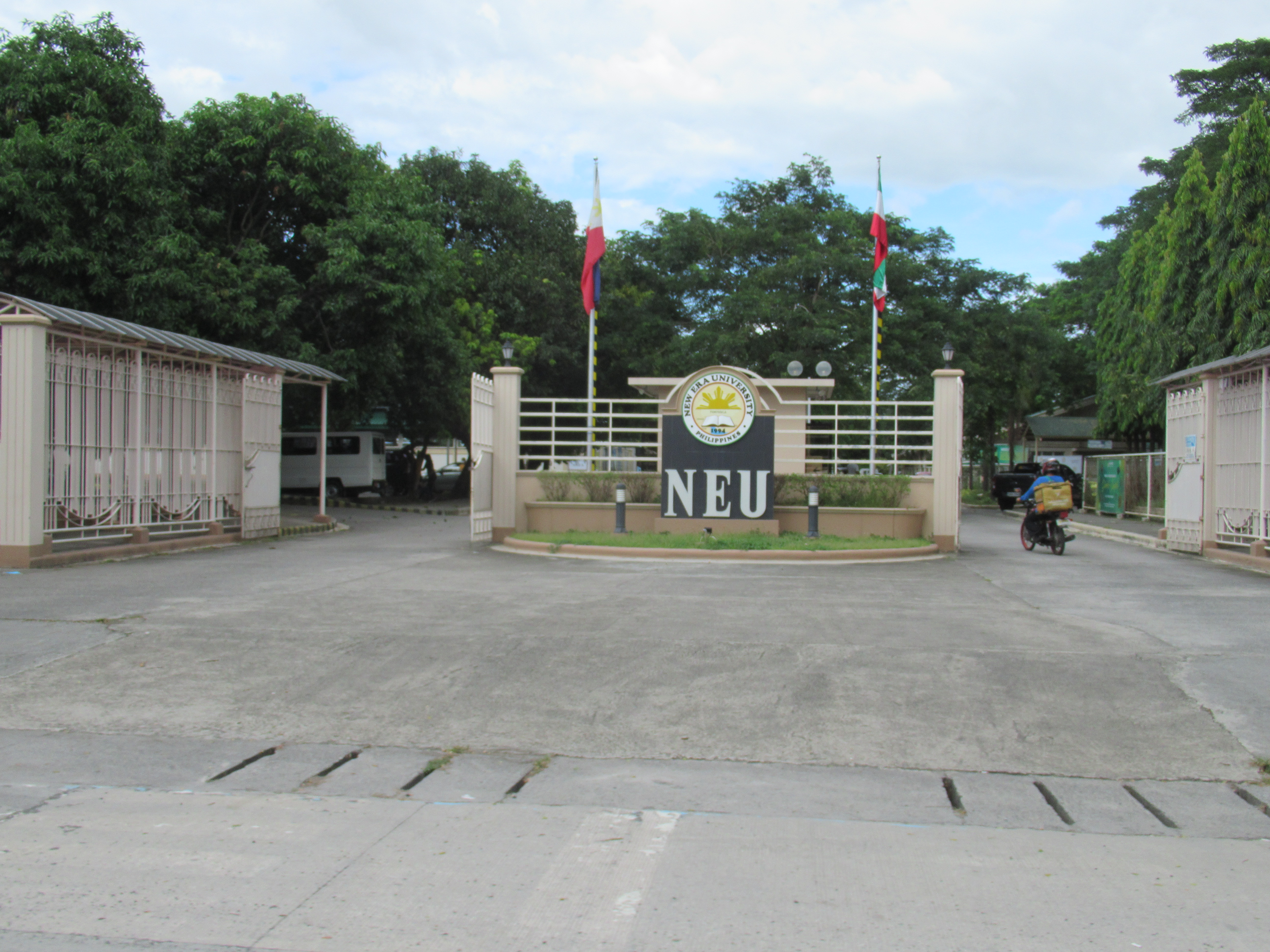
San Fernando, Pampanga branch

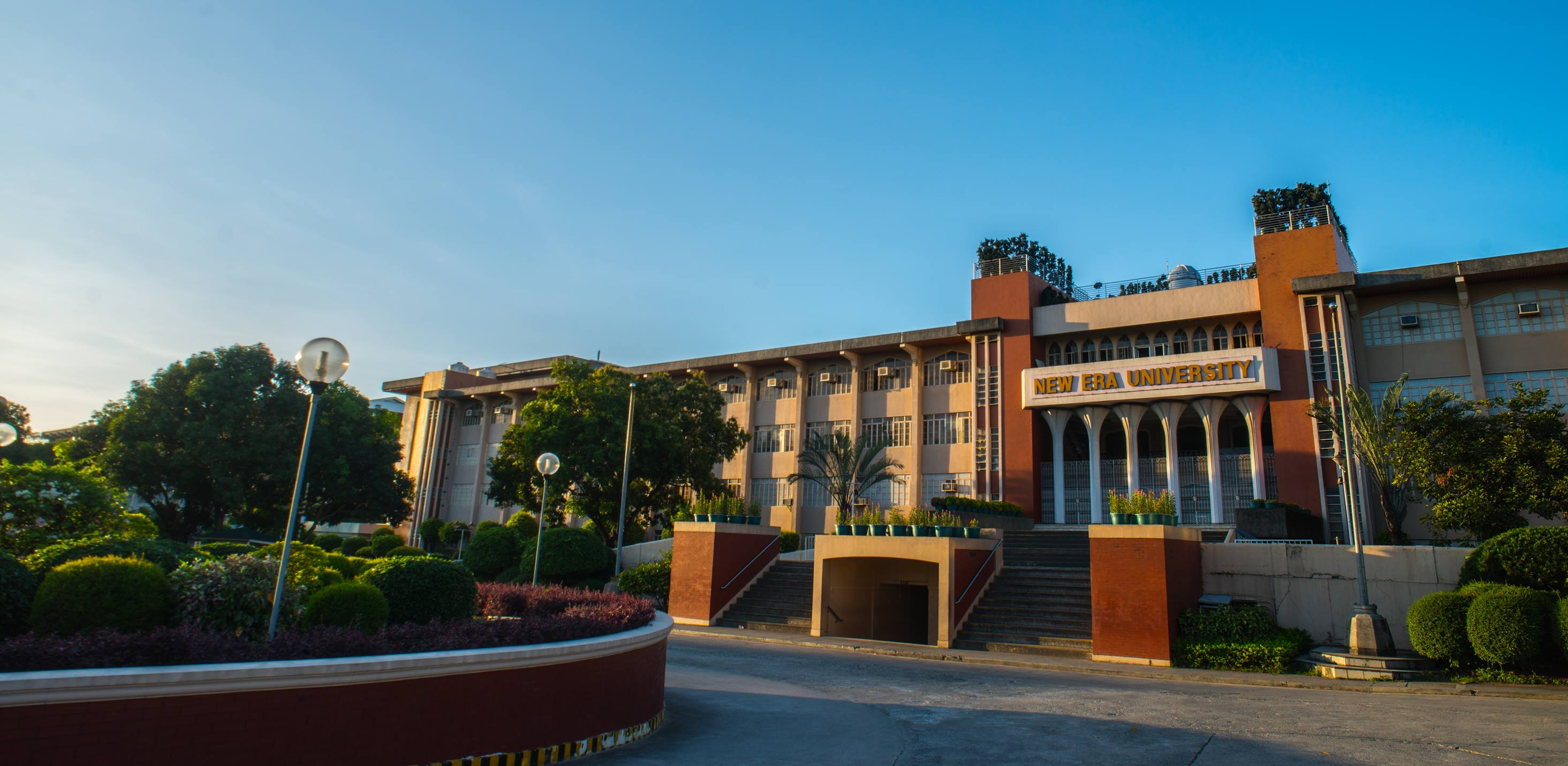
NEU Main in Quezon City

The University is a member of National Athletic Association of Schools, Colleges and Universities (NAASCU), an athletic association of colleges and universities in the Philippines, established in 2001. It is a member of Philippine Association for Technological Education (PATE) and is affiliated with Eagle Broadcasting Corporation.

== Developments ==
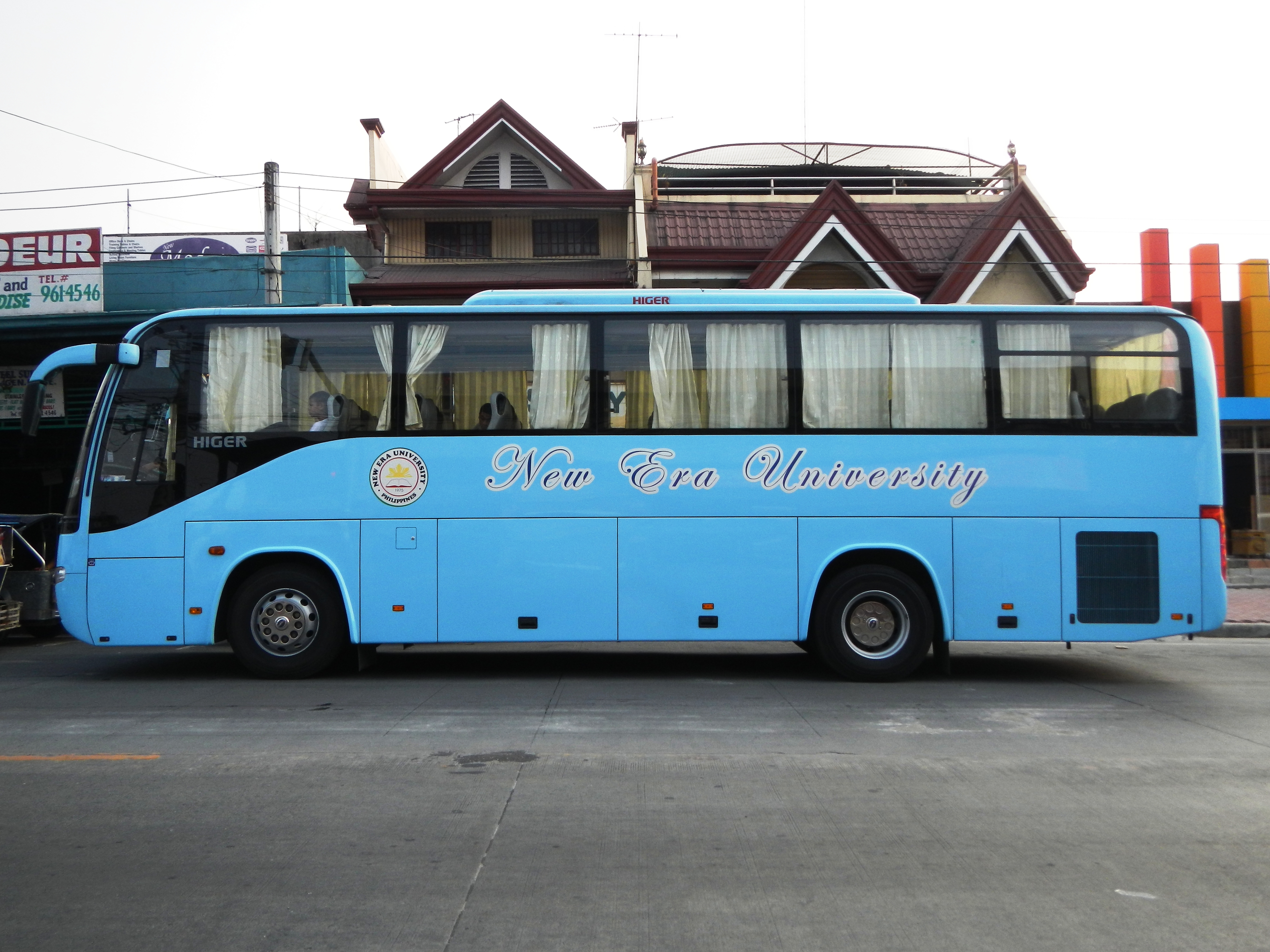
New Era University bus, San Fernando City, Pampanga

New Era University submitted itself to voluntary accreditation. Today, four programs of the University enjoy Level II step 1 reaccreditation with the benefit of full curricular deregulation (Master of Arts in Education, Business Education and Administration courses, Arts and Sciences Courses, and Education Courses).

The students, faculty and staff members, and administration conduct community extension services. The Balik-Aral Program for out-of-school youths is conducted by NEU in coordination with the Department of Education Culture and Sports, now the Department of Education (DepEd) and the Iglesia ni Cristo Social Services Department. This programme brings classes for the out-of-school youth right in their own vicinity using the local facilities of the Church, the expertise of NEU-trained teachers and the teaching-learning modules from DepEd.

With the CHED implementation of the National Service Training Program (NSTP) in June 2002, NEU received commendations from town mayors and community leaders for its implementation of all three NSTP components: Literacy Training Service, Community Welfare Service Training, and Reserved Officers Training Corps.

New Era University will soon have its Bocaue/Santa Maria Campus being built as part of Philippine Arena complex in Ciudad de Victoria at Bocaue, Bulacan. It has also established two more colleges – College of Medicine and College of Architecture.

== Notable alumni ==
- Elaine Duran - Tawag ng Tanghalan Season 3, 2019 Grand Champion of It's Showtime in ABS-CBN
- Klaudia Koronel - Filipino businesswoman and actress
- Gladys Reyes - Filipino actress best known for her role as "Clara" in Mara Clara
- Anthony Taberna - journalist
- Maki - singer

== See also ==
- Iglesia ni Cristo
- Philippine Arena
- List of colleges and universities in Metro Manila
