= Executive Minister of the Iglesia ni Cristo =

New religious movement leader in the Philippines

- Tagapamahalang Pangkalahatan ng Iglesia ni Cristo
- Flag of the Iglesia ni Cristo

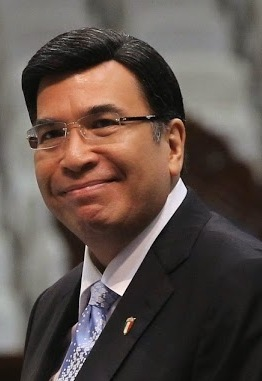
- Incumbent; Eduardo Villanueva Manalo since September 7, 2009
- Seat: INC Central Office in Quezon City
- Term length: No specified limit (Life tenure)
- Formation: 1914
- First holder: Felix Manalo
- Succession: The Deputy Executive Minister, which is elected by Church Ministers, assumes the post after the Executive Minister's death or resignation.
- Deputy: Angelo Eraño V. Manalo

The Executive Minister of the Iglesia ni Cristo (Filipino: Tagapamahalang Pangkalahatan ng Iglesia ni Cristo) is the primary leader of the Philippine-based Christian new religious movement known as the Iglesia ni Cristo.

There has been three Executive Ministers of the church since the Iglesia's founding in 1914 and all of them came from the Manalo family. The Executive Minister serves a life tenure. The Deputy Executive Minister assumes the duties of Executive Minister during the latter's absence and succeeds him when he (Executive Minister) dies or retires. For example, the current Executive Minister, Eduardo V. Manalo was elected Deputy Executive Minister by the INC District Ministers, also known as the Division Ministers in 1994.

The Executive Minister along with Deputy Executive Minister and 11 other Senior Ministers (The Sanggunian or The Advisory Council of the Church) forms the Church's Central Administration.

== List of Executive Ministers ==
Order	Executive Minister	Birthdate	Tenure began	Tenure Ended/ Deathdate	Tenure lasted	Elected (as Deputy Executive Minister)
1st	Felix Y. Manalo	May 10, 1886	July 27, 1914	April 12, 1963 (Note: During World War II, Felix Manalo issued a circular which formalized the assumption to duty of Prudencio Vasquez as Executive Minister on June 29, 1942. Justifying the move as acquiescence to the Japanese demand at the time, Manalo would reassume the post after the war ended.)	48 years, 259 days	None (inaugural holder) (Note: On December 25, 1918, coinciding with the fifth (5th) anniversary celebration of the church, Felix Manalo was ordained as a minister by the following bishops and pastors: Alejandro Reyes (IEMELIF), Victoriano Mariano (IEMELIF), Gil Domingo (Iglesia de los Cristianos Filipinos), Guillermo Zarco (Presbyterian Church), Emiliano Quijano (Iglesia ni Cristo 1901) (Note: The official name of the Christian Mission established in the Philippines in 1901 is Iglesia Ni Cristo. To distinguish this from the INC founded by Felix Manalo in 1914, the year of establishment was added. Manalo registered the church in 1914 as Iglesia ni Kristo or INK.), Nicolas Fajardo (Evangelical Church), Roque Bautista (Evangelical Church).)
2nd	Eraño G. Manalo	January 2, 1925	April 23, 1963	August 31, 2009	46 years, 130 days	January 28, 1953
3rd	Eduardo V. Manalo	October 31, 1955	September 7, 2009	Incumbent and alive	17 years, 62 days	May 6, 1994 (Note: Took oath on May 7, 1994)
