= Iglesia ni Cristo chapel, San Francisco del Monte =

Church in Quezon City, Philippines

Iglesia ni Cristo Chapel San Francisco del Monte
- Lokal ng San Francisco del Monte (Filipino)
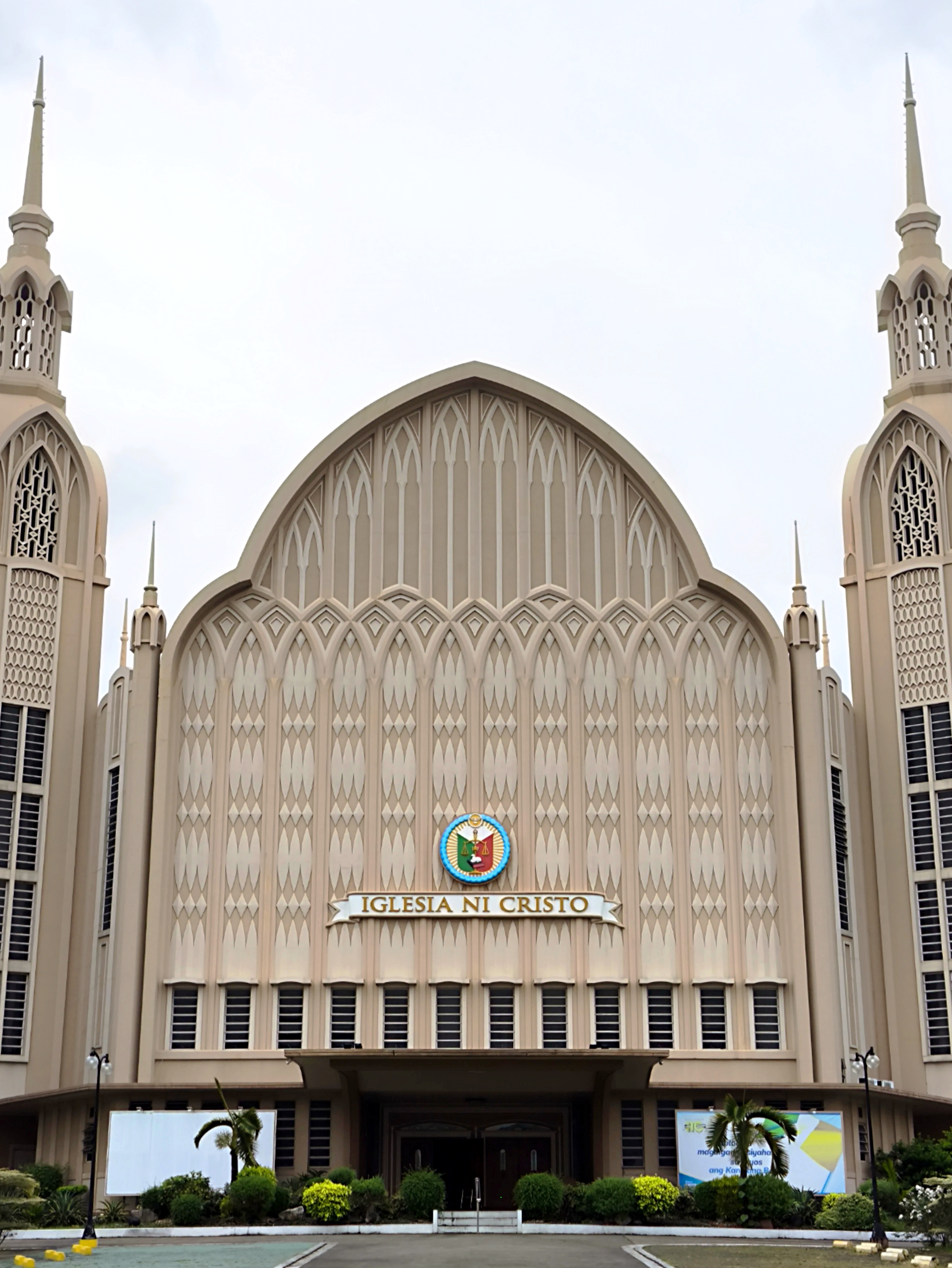
- Prior to the construction of the current structure of the INC Lokal ng Tondo (1967) and the INC Lokal ng Templo Central (1984), the INC Lokal ng Frisco was the largest INC chapel in terms of seating capacity.
- Iglesia ni Cristo Chapel San Francisco del Monte
- 14°38′29″N 121°01′02″E
- Location: San Francisco del Monte, Quezon City, Metro Manila
- Country: Philippines
- Denomination: Iglesia ni Cristo

History
- Status: Locale Congregation

Architecture
- Functional status: active
- Architect: Carlos A. Santos-Viola
- Completed: July 27, 1962; 64 years ago;

Specifications
- Capacity: 3,200

Administration
- District: Quezon City

The Iglesia Ni Cristo Locale of San Francisco del Monte (Filipino: Lokal ng San Francisco del Monte) or Frisco is a chapel of the Philippine-based Christian cult, the Iglesia ni Cristo. Located along Del Monte Avenue, San Francisco del Monte, Quezon City, it was completed on July 27, 1962, and was dedicated by Brother Felix Y. Manalo. The locale congregation was the first to be established in the newly created Quezon City in 1937. Currently, It is the home of the baptistry for the Quezon City Ecclesiastical District.

Built by architect, Carlos A. Santos-Viola for growing brethren of Barrio San Francisco del Monte, Manresa, and New Sta. Mesa. The church administration decided to build a huge house of worship in 1962. This concrete chapel, was built to replace the wood and iron chapel which seats 250. The design of the chapel is Art-Deco fused with Neo-Gothic and Romanesque details.

It was the site of funeral rites of Brother Felix Manalo in 1963, which were attended by over 2 Million brethren before Brother Manalo's remains buried in mausoleum in old central office in San Juan. In the film Felix Manalo, the funeral scene was depicted at this house of worship, as it happened in 1963.

It was refurbished in 2007 to upgrade the interior design which is standard for the new chapels of the church, which most of the previous design are retained. The aging pews of the chapel were replaced with newer ones. The choir loft was renovated, installed LED covelights and was expanded. The floor was replaced with low-maintenance Granite Tiles from Italy. The lobby was also renovated and expanded to accommodate more worshipers and guests.
