= Felix Manalo =

Filipino religious minister (1886–1963)

- Executive Minister
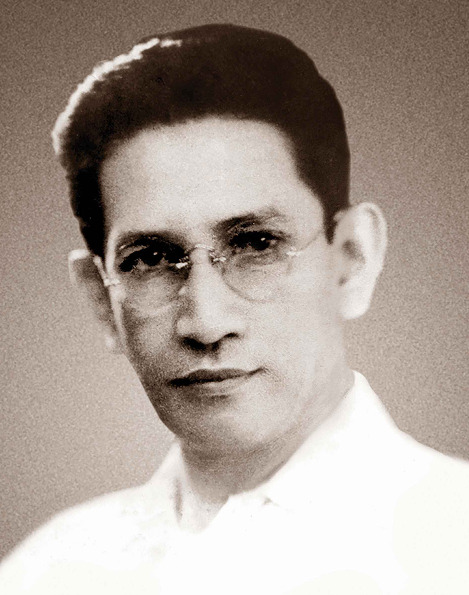
- Church: Iglesia ni Cristo (registered in 1914 as Iglesia ni Kristo) (Note: Based on the Articles of Incorporation, the registration date is July 13, 1914 as Iglesia ni Kristo or INK, while the Amended Articles of Incorporation filed in 1948 indicated the registration date is June 27, 1914 (as Iglesia ni Cristo or INC). The Amended Articles of Incorporation filed in 1973 already indicated the registration date of the church as July 27, 1914. The last mentioned date is carried over by the SEC in its website. This date of registration (July 27) is currently commemorated by the church as its anniversary date.)
- In office: July 27, 1914 – April 12, 1963 (48 years, 8 months, 16 days) (Note: During World War II, Felix Manalo issued a circular which formalized the assumption to duty of Prudencio Vasquez as Executive Minister on June 29, 1942. Justifying the move as acquiescence to the Japanese demand at the time, Manalo would reassume the post after the war ended.)
- Successor: Eraño Manalo

Orders
- Ordination: December 25, 1918 by Alejandro Reyes (IEMELIF), Victoriano Mariano (IEMELIF), Gil Domingo (Iglesia de los Cristianos Filipinos), Guillermo Zarco (Presbyterian Church), Emiliano Quijano (Iglesia ni Cristo 1901), (Note: Besides delivering thanksgiving sermon for this occasion, Quijano was also known as the minister who officiated Manalo's wedding. The official name of the Christian Mission established in the Philippines in 1901 is Iglesia Ni Cristo. To distinguish this from the INC founded by Felix Manalo in 1914, the year of establishment was added. Manalo registered the church in 1914 as Iglesia ni Kristo or INK.) Nicolas Fajardo (Evangelical Church), Roque Bautista (Evangelical Church)

Personal details
- Born: Félix Ysagun y Manalo; May 10, 1886 Calzada Tipas, Taguig, Manila, Captaincy General of the Philippines
- Died: April 12, 1963 (aged 76) Quezon City, Philippines
- Buried: Iglesia ni Cristo Locale of F. Manalo-San Juan
- Denomination: Filipino Protestantism prev. Catholicism
- Parents: Mariano Ysagun; Bonifacia Manalo
- Spouse: Tomasa Sereneo (m. 1910; died 1912) Honorata de Guzmán (m. 1913)
- Children: 7, including Pilar, Eraño and Bienvenido

Felix Ysagun Manalo (born Félix Ysagun y Manalo; May 10, 1886 – April 12, 1963), also known as Ka Felix, was a Filipino minister who founded Iglesia ni Cristo (INC), a Christian new religious movement in the Philippines officially registered in 1914 (as Iglesia ni Kristo). Manalo is believed by INC adherents to be the last prophet of God in the final days sent to reestablish the church that Jesus first founded, which they claimed to have fallen into apostasy following the deaths of the apostles. (Note: According to INC doctrine, God's four messengers in the church era are Jesus Christ, Paul the Apostle, Martin Luther, and Felix Manalo.) He served as the church's first Executive Minister until his death in 1963, and was succeeded by his son, Eraño Manalo.

Born in a devout Catholic family, Manalo began questioning Catholic teachings during the Philippine Revolution in the 1890s, ultimately converting first as a Methodist in 1904, then as a Seventh-day Adventist in 1911 before he began preaching what was to become the doctrine of the Iglesia ni Cristo at a neighborhood in Santa Ana, Manila, which he formally registered to the Philippine government on July 27, 1914 as a religious corporation. He was seen as the "angel ascending from the East" (as mentioned in Revelation 7) by his early followers. During his tenure as Executive Minister, he oversaw the church's early growth and rapid expansion following the Japanese occupation of the country during World War II. By the 1950s, Manalo's health had deteriorated, leaving most of his official church duties to his son Eraño. He died in 1963.

== Biography ==
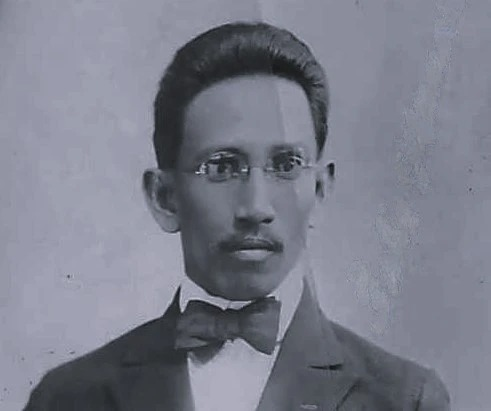
Manalo in 1920

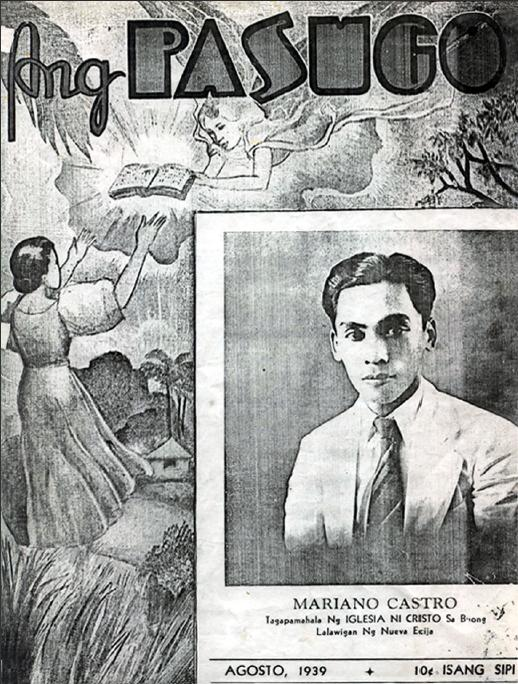
Cover of the August 1939 issue of the Pasugo, the official publication of the Iglesia ni Cristo, featuring an artist's depiction of the "angel from the East" which INC members believe to be Manalo himself.

Manalo was born as Felix Ysagun in Barrio Calzada, Tipas, Taguig, Manila province (now Calzada, Taguig, Metro Manila) on May 10, 1886, the eldest child of Mariano Ysagun y Villanueva and Bonifacia Manalo y Cruz. While records of his baptismal was lost, because parish records would only go back as early as June 1886, it is believed that he was christened on May 18, the feast day of Felix of Cantalice, most likely his namesake given the common practice of Catholic Filipino families during that period to name their child after saints whose feast fall on the date of birth or baptismal. Raised to a poor rural family, he received little formal education. His father died when he was two to three years old, from which he began using his mother's maiden name Manalo. At the age of seven, Manalo was said to have attended classes under a certain "Maestro Cario" in Manila. His studies were interrupted by the Philippine Revolution in 1896, prompting him not to pursue further formal education, and turn to farming and hatmaking instead.

Manalo began questioning Catholic teachings by the late 1890s. He resided in Manila at his uncle Mariano Borja, a Catholic priest assigned to a local parish in Sampaloc. During this period, Manalo started becoming disillusioned with mainstream Catholic faith and began believing in colorumism, a syncretism of Christian and animist beliefs popular among Filipino peasants during the revolution, making secret trips to Mount Banahaw and Mount San Cristobal in southern Luzon. During the early years of the American period, Manalo became interested in Protestant doctrine that entered the country through American missionaries. In 1904, he became a Methodist, switching among Protestant denominations until 1911, when he became a Seventh-day Adventist lay preacher. (Note: Some sources indicate that Manalo was an Adventist pastor, but official Adventist sources say that the first Filipino ministers were ordained by the church by 1919, excluding Manalo.) After being antagonized by fellow Adventists for his colorum past, and being reprimanded for his elopement with his future wife (they were married in a different church), Manalo left Adventism in 1913, and associated himself with atheist and agnostic peers. Frustrated with the doctrines of foreign denominations, he soon began personally studying the Bible which culminated in November 1913 when he concluded that a fresh examination of the Bible is needed from a non-Western perspective.

== Iglesia ni Cristo ==
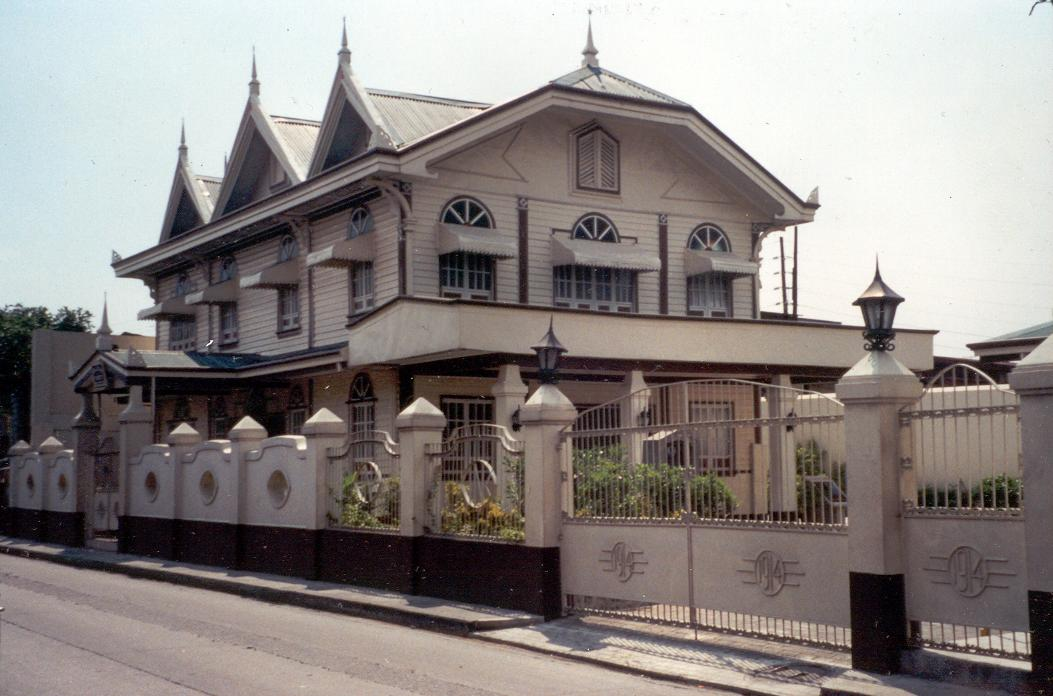
Built in 1937, the former chapel of the congregation of Punta in Santa Ana, Manila is now an INC museum. Notable is the fence design featuring the letters "INK", the abbreviation of the church's original registered name Iglesia ni Kristo.

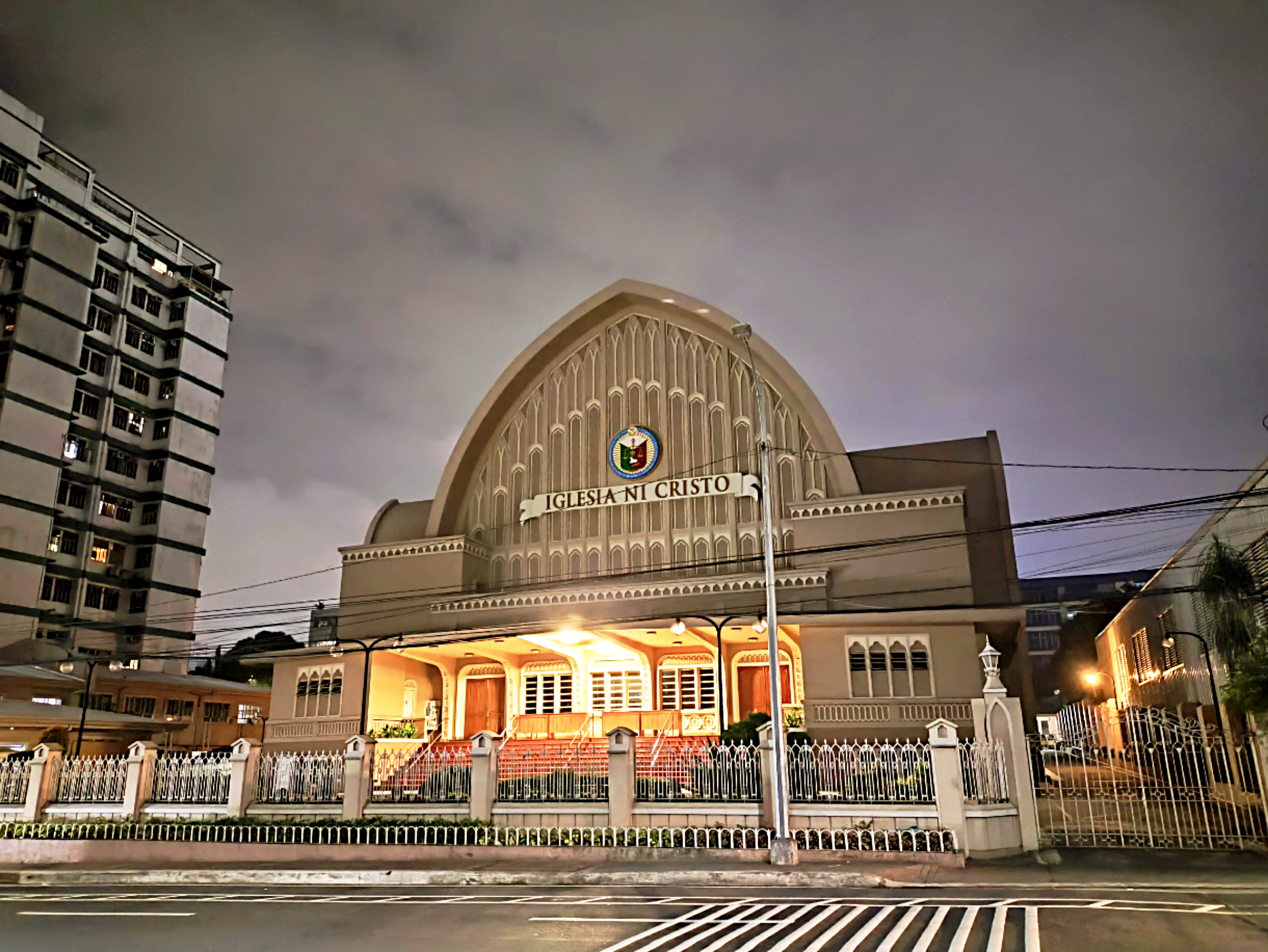
Completed in 1954, the Iglesia Ni Cristo (INC) Lokal ng Cubao in Quezon City is the first major chapel designed by Filipino Architect Carlos A. Santos-Viola for the INC. It is believed to have inspired future designs of INC chapels all over the Philippines.

In November 1913, Manalo began a three-day fast and meditation at a friend's house in Pasay, writing his core doctrine. He proposed founding a new church in Asia, which he named "Iglesia ni Kristo" (INK), Tagalog for "Church of Christ". He started preaching his doctrine in Punta, a neighborhood in Santa Ana, Manila, and his hometown Taguig. He later baptized a few converts, including some of his persecutors, along the Pasig River on December 25, 1913. They formed the first members of the church. He eventually attracted more followers. Among those he invited to become ministers of his new church would be Bishop Nicolas Zamora of IEMELIF, who was then leading an 11,000-member Methodist church (Zamora refused the offer). (Note: According to the INC, Manalo was one of the members of Zamora's congregation when the former joined the Methodists in 1904. The extent of the relationship between Manalo and Zamora, however, was not fully explored by both INC and Methodist sources. Zamora died on September 14, 1914, two months after Manalo registered the Iglesia ni Kristo.) Prompted by concerns that his evangelism and propagation efforts for the new church might be illegal, Manalo registered the Iglesia ni Kristo (INK) at the Philippine government on July 27, 1914 as a sole religious corporation, (Note: Based on the Articles of Incorporation, the registration date is July 14, 1914, while the Amended Articles of Incorporation filed in 1948 indicated the registration date is June 27, 1914 (as Iglesia ni Cristo or INC). The Amended Articles of Incorporation filed in 1973 already indicated the registration date of the church as July 27, 1914. The last mentioned date is carried over by the SEC in its website. This date of registration (July 27) is currently commemorated by the church as its anniversary date.) the date now officially acknowledged by the INC as its foundation date. Manalo went twice to the United States to study religion in Protestant-managed schools, first in 1919, and later in 1938. (Note: According to the INC, Manalo studied at the Protestant seminary Pacific School of Religion (PSR), affiliated with the United Church of Christ, from 1919 to 1921. Manalo himself attested he had once a conflict with a Japanese schoolmate there. However, school records indicate that Manalo was never a student of the PSR.) Expansion followed as the INC started building congregations in the provinces as early as 1916. Early church members were said to be mostly uneducated and coming from the lower socioeconomic classes, the ministers included.

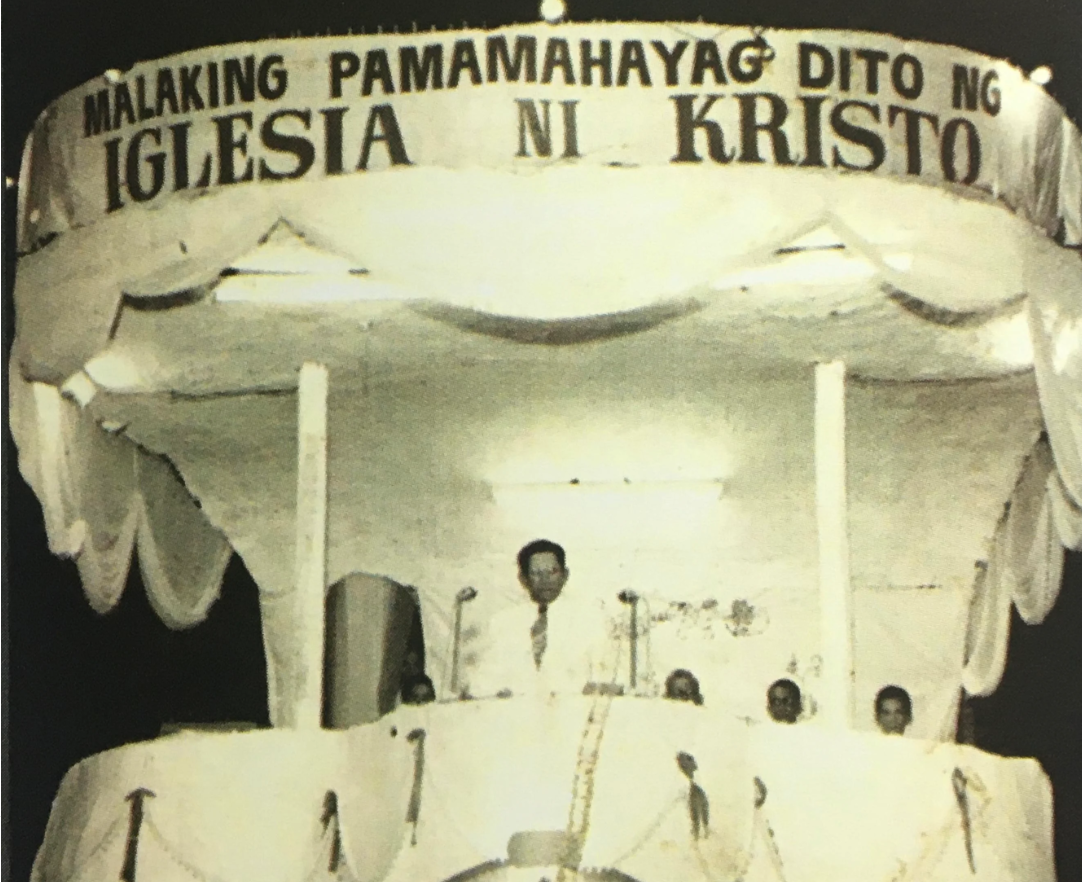
Grand Evangelical Rally (Malaking Pamamahayag) of the Iglesia Ni Cristo aimed to attract new members.

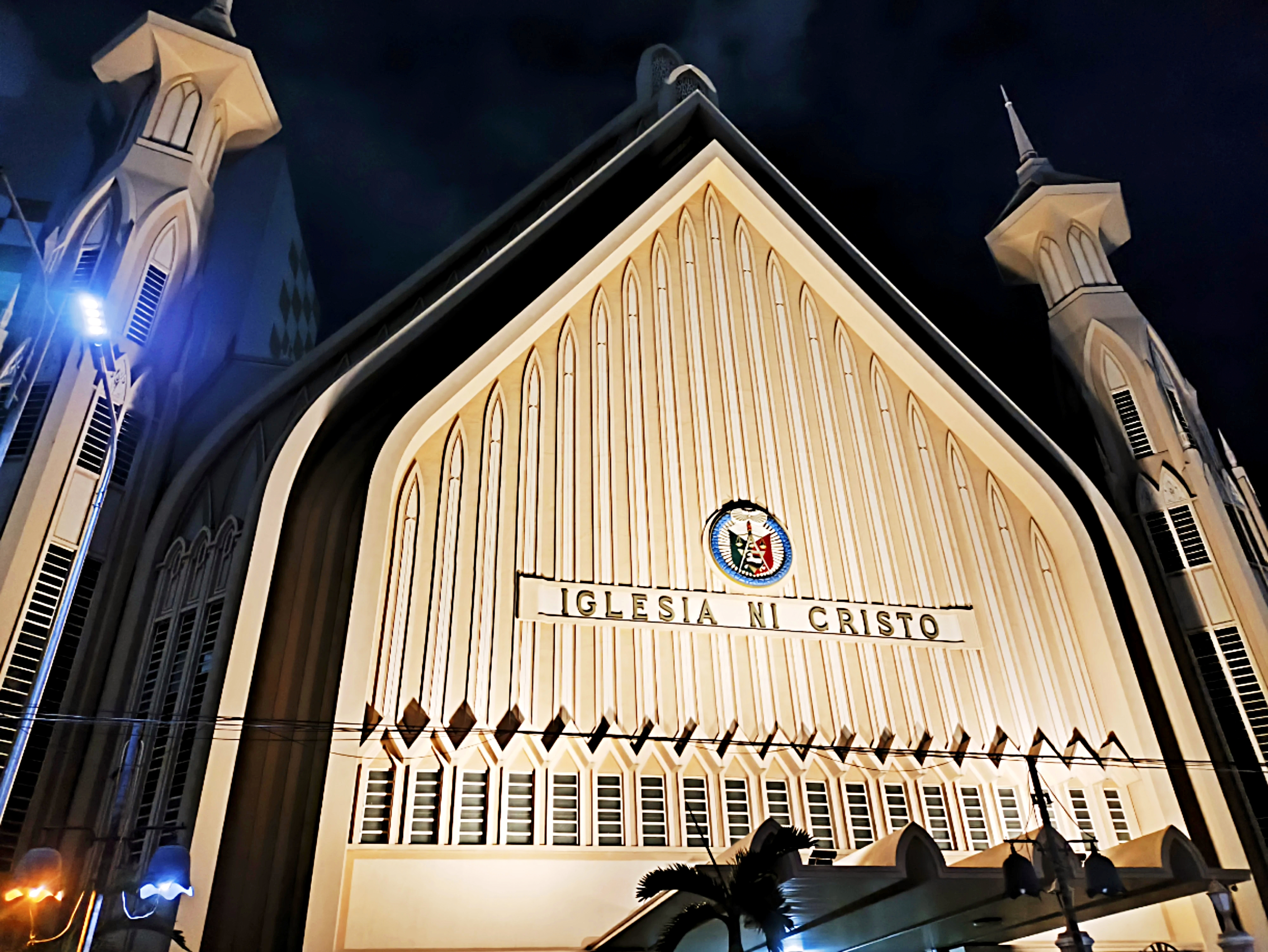
The INC Locale of Tondo, established on November 6, 1915, is one of the earliest congregations of the church. The current structure was completed in 1967.

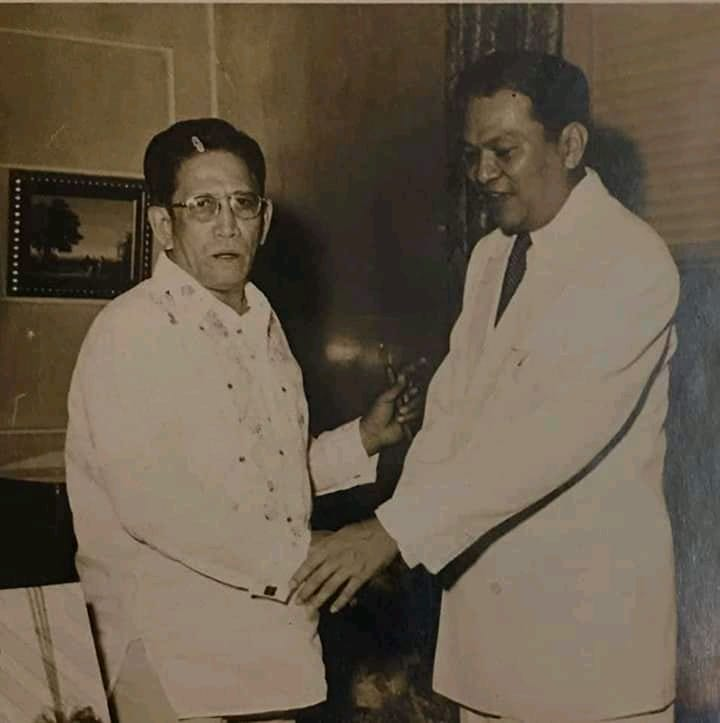
President Ramon Magsaysay with the INC's Manalo holding a cigar.

Throughout his lifetime, Manalo is seen by his followers as the ultimate authority on the church affairs, including its theology and bureaucracy, even approving the architectural design of its distinctive churches, and of the daily lives of INC members. Manalo's authority over the church was so pervasive that outsiders termed the church as the Iglesia ni Manalo (transl. Church of Manalo) and its adherents "Manalistas" for their "fanatical" obedience to the church administration. In response to the separation of congregations led by INC ministers Teofilo Ora, Januario Ponce, and Basilio Santiago, which schism severely divided the emerging church primarily in the provinces such as Bulacan and Nueva Ecija, Manalo's title as the Sugo (transl. Messenger) was introduced to church doctrine in 1922, after interpreting that Manalo is the "angel from the East" mentioned in Revelation 7:2. Ora and the ministers who went with him clashed with Manalo in terms of doctrine, such as the decreasing relevance of Jesus Christ in the INC preaching (paksa), and how the church was run, particularly in light of reported abuses and immorality. Other changes by this time included the eventual rejection of cassock (sutana) as clothing for ministers. Despite this, the INC had about 3,000 to 5,000 adherents in 43 or 45 congregations in Manila and six nearby provinces by 1924. Church growth, however, came with more troubles. In 1928, INC Minister Nicolas Perez of Bulacan led another significant split across church ranks. Perez protested against abuses of the church, the changing doctrine on vices and jewelry, and the controlling nature of the church administration that discourages open-mindedness and critical thinking among its members. Perez later founded a separate religious movement that experienced further schisms, with one faction eventually led by Eli Soriano and later becoming the Members Church of God International. This contributed to the long-standing Conflicts between Iglesia ni Cristo and Members Church of God International through televised debates, doctrinal criticisms, and public exchanges between their ministers and Soriano. (Note: During Manalo's early ministry, wearing of jewelry, and engagement in vices such as smoking and drinking alcohol were banned. Drinking soft drinks were also prohibited by Manalo. Later on, as the INC began to attract more affluent members, and enforcing abstinence on new converts proved more difficult, church doctrine softened on these prohibitions. Manalo and the ministers who agree with him defended the change in doctrine by saying that these practices are not explicitly prohibited in the Bible.) According to Teodoro Santiago, the third INC Minister to be ordained in the church, Manalo began to openly reject the deity of Christ around the year 1932, but still maintained that Jesus is Lord (Panginoong Hesukristo). By 1936, the INC had 85,000 recruits. This figure grew to 200,000 by 1954. It expanded into the Visayas by 1937, Northern Luzon by 1938, Mindoro by 1940, and Mindanao by 1941. By 1938, Manalo threatened the INC brethren that he would leave the church and start anew, prompting a circular issued by Teodoro Santiago to submit their respective explanations (salaysay) to keep the church united. During World War II, Manalo was offered by the Japanese to lead the all-Filipino Evangelical Church of the Philippines (福音教会). His refusal led to Japanese suspicion and surveillance, to the point that Manalo acceded to the Japanese demand to have Prudencio Vasquez, division minister of Nueva Ecija and later of Bicol, as the Executive Minister of the Iglesia ni Cristo. This was formalized through a circular issued on June 29, 1942. Manalo resumed to be the Executive Minister after the war. Meanwhile, the INC's first concrete chapel was built in Sampaloc, Manila, in 1948. Adherents fleeing Manila, where the Japanese forces were concentrated during the Second World War, were used for evangelization. By 1950, Manalo himself claimed that the INC had 2 million members. The 1960 Census in the Philippines, however, showed adherents totaling to 270,104. By 1955, the overall educational attainment of INC members had also improved, with an estimated 35 percent of its total membership being considered literate. This is, however, lower than the national literacy rate of 75 percent in the same year. As Manalo's health began to fail in the 1950s, his son Eraño started to take leadership of the church.

== Death ==
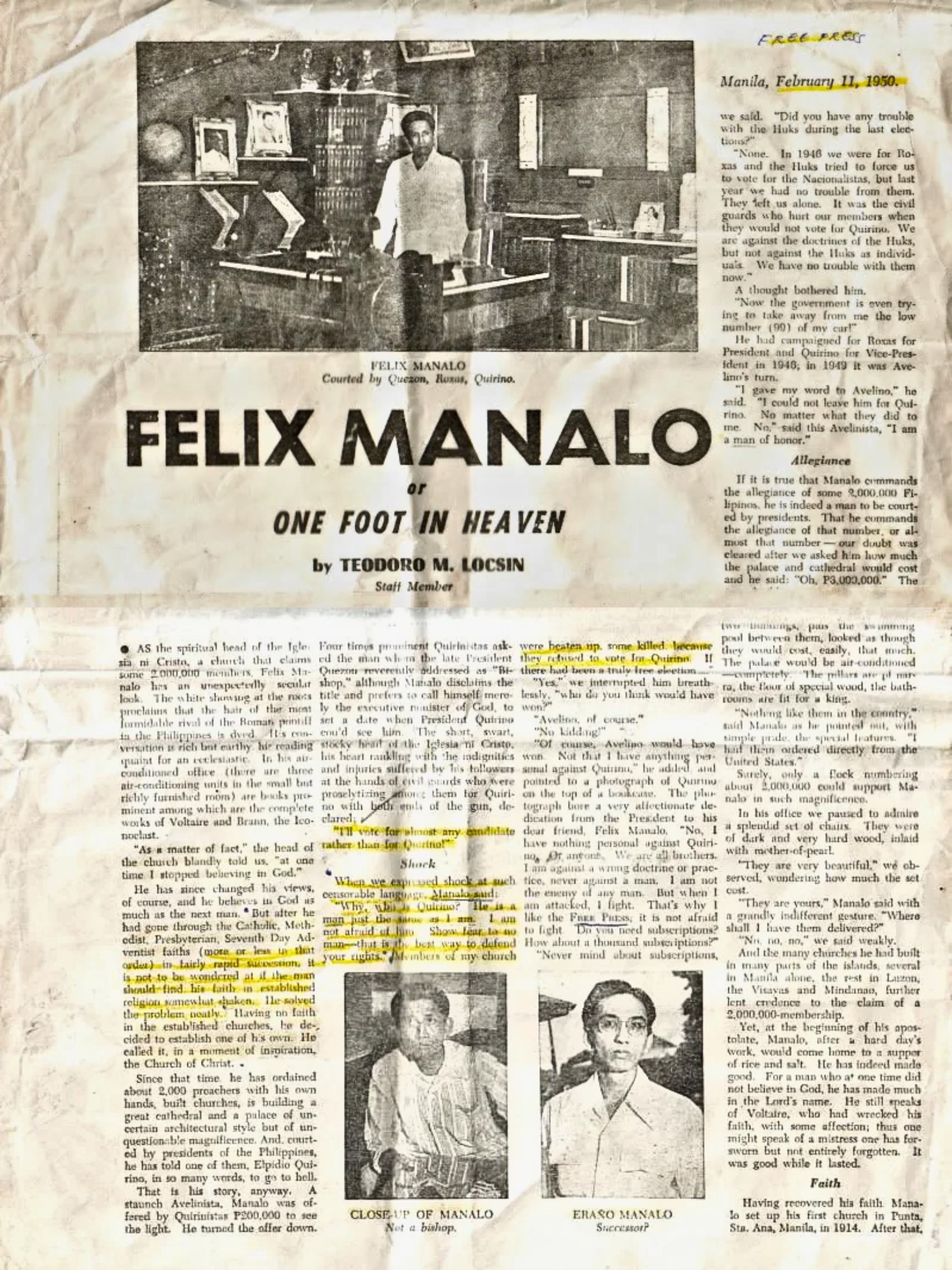
Philippines Free Press feature of the interview of Felix Manalo by Teodoro Locsin, Sr. (February 11, 1950), where Manalo claimed that the INC has 2 million members. In the said interview, Manalo also explained his support for Senator Jose Avelino, who lost his bid for the 1949 Philippine presidential election. Framed photographs of Avelino and President Manuel L. Quezon were visible in Manalo's office.

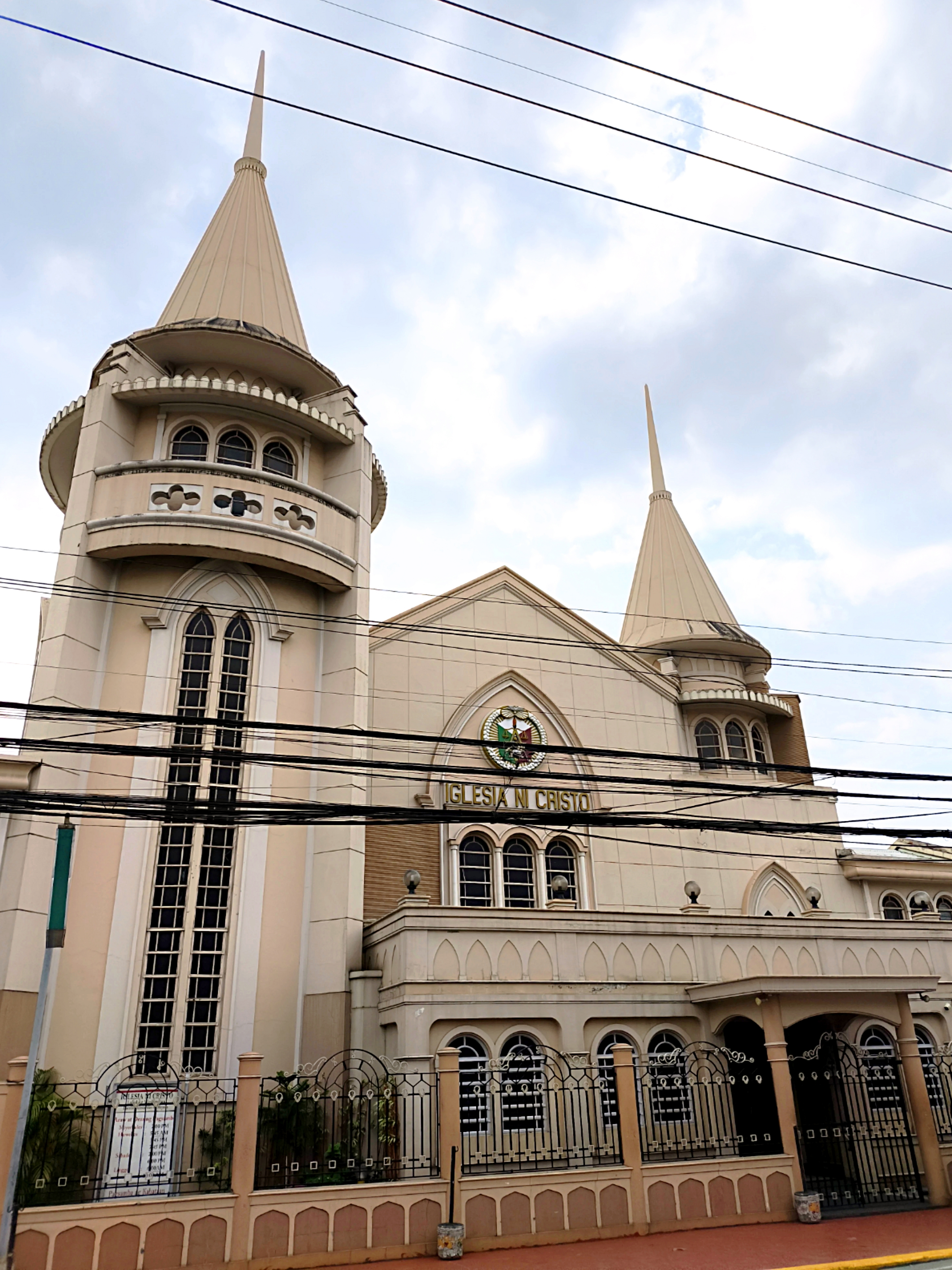
The INC Lokal ng Washington (Sampaloc, Manila) is the first concrete chapel of the Iglesia ni Cristo. It was completed in 1948. The first members of this congregation mainly came from the INC Lokal ng Tayuman.

Manalo's health started to deteriorate in the 1950s. On April 2, 1963, Manalo was confined to hospital for treatment of peptic ulcer disease. Days later, on April 11, doctors performed a surgery on him for his ulcer, from which he did not recover. He died in the early hours of April 12 at the age of 76. Leadership of the church was passed two weeks later to his son, Eraño, who was chosen unanimously by the district ministers as his successor in 1953. His remains were viewed by mourners in San Francisco del Monte, Quezon City. On April 23, he was buried at what was then the central office of the Iglesia ni Cristo in San Juan, Rizal. The local police estimated the crowd at the funeral procession to have been two million, and the rite took five hours.

== Legacy ==
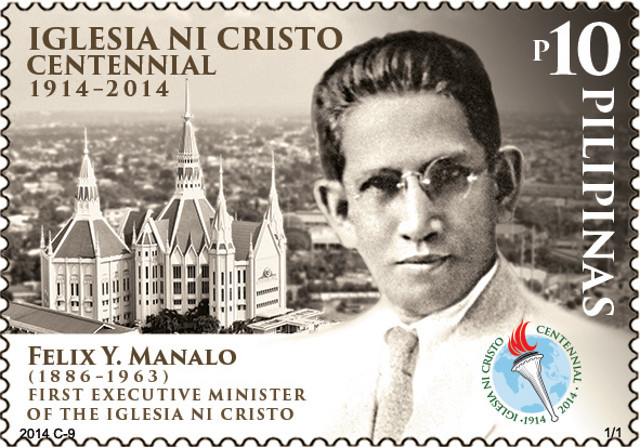
Manalo on a 2014 stamp of the Philippines

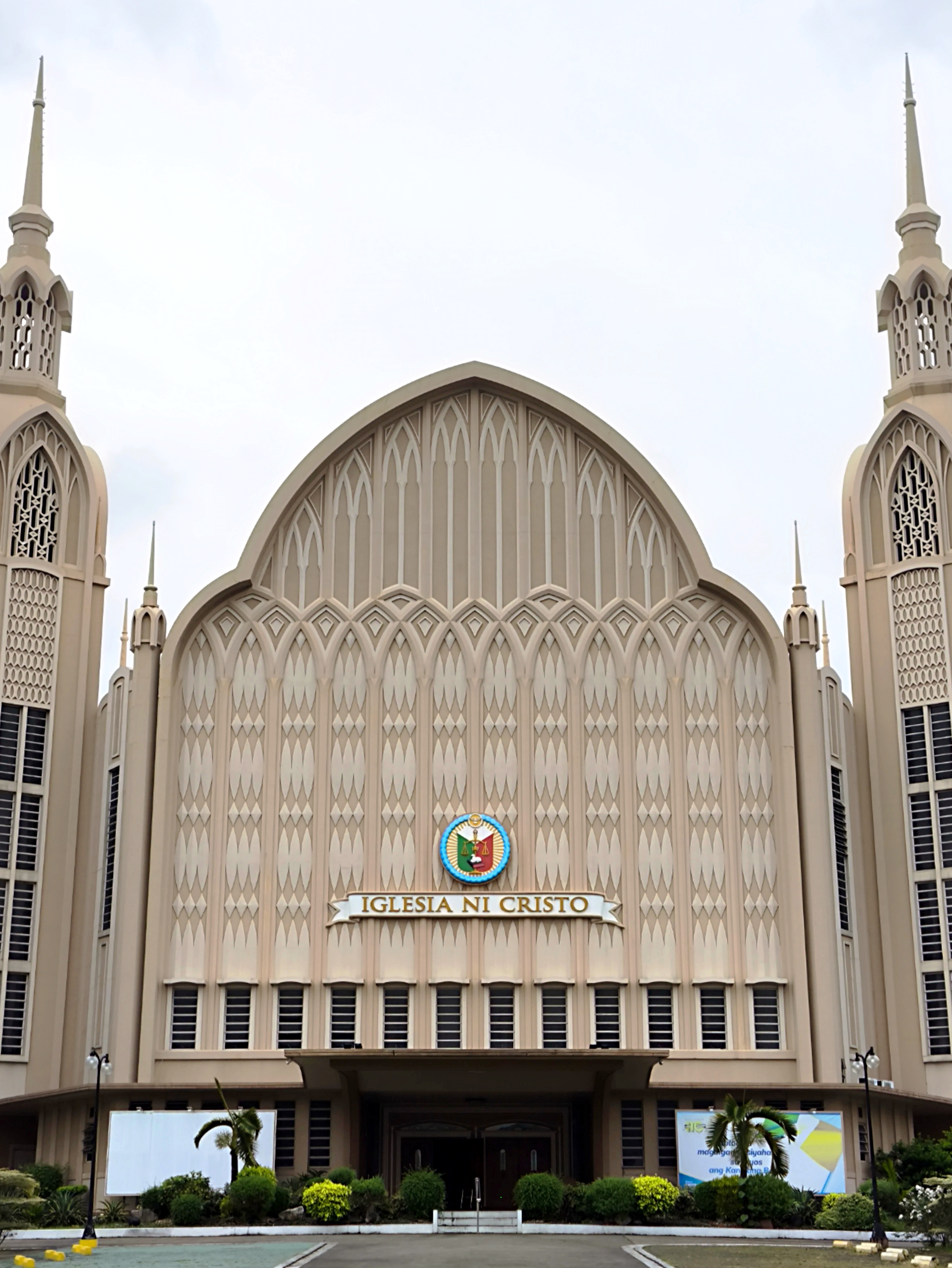
Completed on July 27, 1962, the Iglesia Ni Cristo (INC) Lokal ng San Francisco del Monte, also known locally as the Lokal ng Frisco, is one of the major chapels designed by Architect Carlos A. Santos-Viola for the INC. It was also one of the last chapels dedicated during the lifetime of INC founder Felix Manalo, later serving as the site of his funeral in 1963. Prior to the construction of the current structure of the INC Lokal ng Tondo (1967) and the INC Lokal ng Templo Central (1984), the INC Lokal ng Frisco was the largest INC chapel in terms of seating capacity at 3,200.

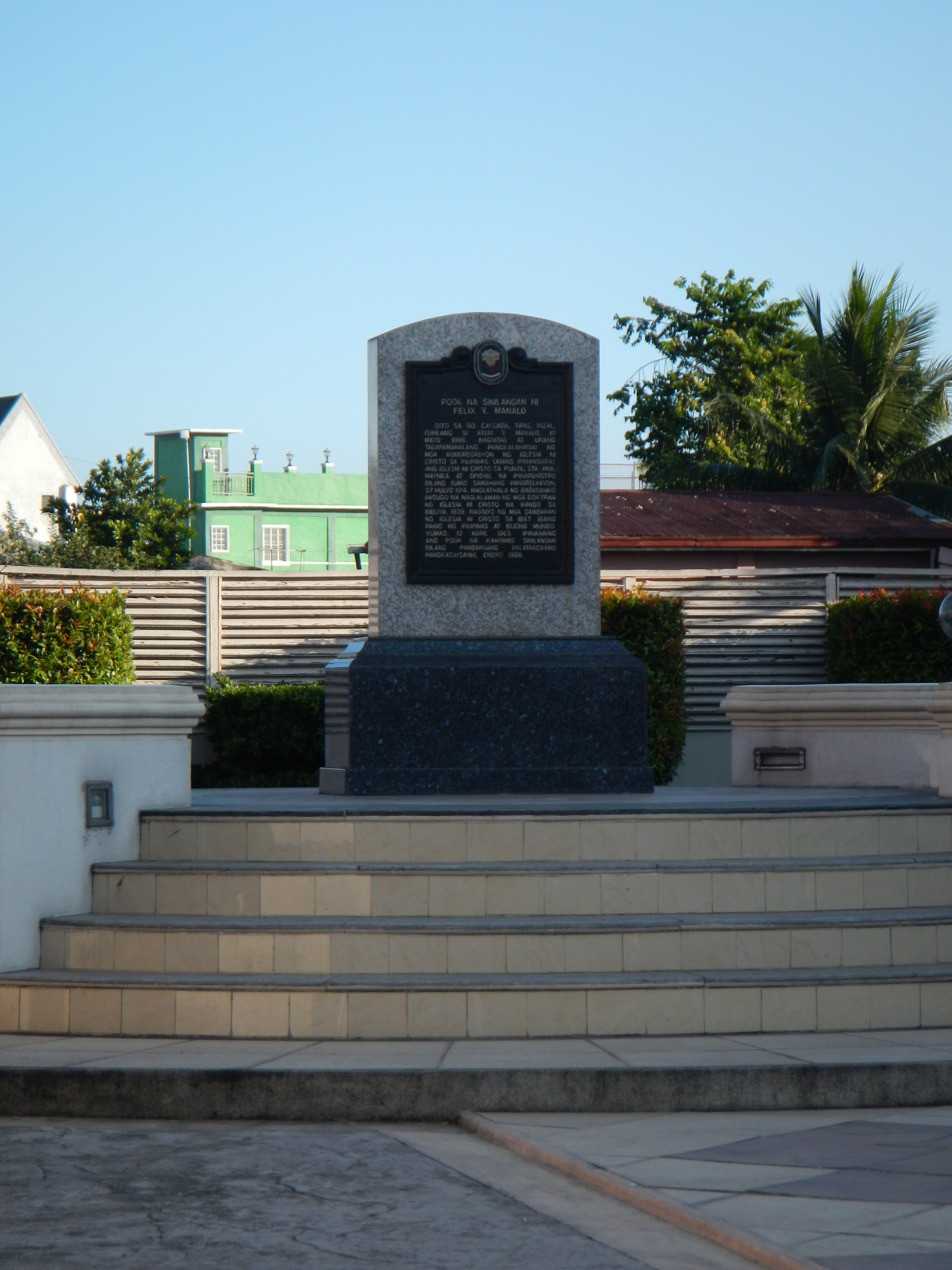
Historical marker at Manalo's birth place in Calzada, Taguig.

Coinciding with the fifth (5th) anniversary celebration of the INC, the ministers of the Iglesia ni Cristo 1901 (Christian Mission) honored him on December 25, 1918, as an outstanding evangelist.

The Genius Divinical College of Manila on Avenida Rizal, a non-sectarian institution headed by Eugenio Guerero, conferred on Felix Manalo the degree of Master of Biblo-Science honoris causa on March 28, 1931.

On July 27, 2007, coinciding with the 93rd anniversary of the Iglesia ni Cristo, the National Historical Institute (NHI) unveiled a marker on his birthplace in Calzada, Taguig, declaring the site as a National Historical Landmark, with the executive director of the institute, Ludovico Badoy, giving remarks. The site is maintained by the INC. On the same year, the Philippine government declared July 27 of every year as "Iglesia ni Cristo Day". On May 10, 2014, coinciding with his 128th birth anniversary, Philpost controversially released a commemorative stamp celebrating the 100th year of the church's registration in the Philippines, which featured a portrait of him against the backdrop of the INC Central Temple. Philpost was sued for allegedly using public funds to support religious groups, reaching the Supreme Court of the Philippines but was dismissed, with the court holding that the stamps acknowledged the Iglesia ni Cristo but did not sponsor it.

A significant number of roads and streets were named after Felix Manalo or variants of his name in the following areas:

- Felix Manalo, Santa Ana, Manila (vicinity of the first INC chapel in Punta)
- Felix Manalo, Quezon City (connected to Aurora Boulevard)
- Felix Y. Manalo, Cainta (connected to Sumulong Highway)
- F. Y. Manalo, Las Piñas (connected to Marcos Alvarez Avenue Extension)
- F. Manalo, San Juan, Metro Manila (location of Manalo's burial site)
- F. Manalo, Taguig (vicinity of Manalo's National Historical Landmark)
- F. Manalo, Pasig (vicinity of INC Lokal ng Pasig)
- F. Manalo Bridge, Pasig (a segment of Caruncho Road)
- F. Manalo, Marikina (a segment of Balubad Street)
- F. Manalo, Antipolo (vicinity of INC Lokal ng Antipolo)
- Felix Manalo, San Miguel, Bulacan (vicinity of INC Lokal ng San Miguel)
- Felix Manalo, Santo Tomas, Batangas (intersecting General Miguel Malvar Avenue)
- Felix Manalo, Botolan, Zambales (a segment of Korokoy Road)

== Family tree ==
Manuel Manalo	Candida Torres
Maria Cruz	Andres Manalo
Bonifacia Manalo
Tomasa Sereneo (d. 1912)	Felix Manalo (1886–1963)	Honorata de Guzman
Gerardo Manalo (1912)	Pilar Manalo-Danao (1914–1987)	Avelina Manalo-Makapugay	Dominador Manalo	Salvador Manalo	Eraño Manalo (1925–2009)	Cristina Villanueva (b. 1937)	Bienvenido Manalo (b. 1935)
Lynn Ventura	Eduardo Manalo (b. 1955)	Lolita Manalo-Hemedez	Erlinda Manalo-Alcantara	Liberty Manalo-Albert	Felix Nathaniel Manalo II	Marco Eraño Manalo
Dorothy Kristine Manalo-Orasa	Gemma Minna Manalo-de Guzman	Angelo Eraño Manalo

== Works ==
- Manalo, Felix Y. (1936). Mga katotohanang dapat malaman ukol sa mga aral ng Iglesia Katolika Apostolika Romano [Truths That Must Be Learned About the Apostolic Roman Catholic Church] (in Tagalog). Manila: P. Vera.
- Manalo, Felix Y. (1947). Ang Sulo Sa Ikatitiyak Sa Iglesia Katolika Apostolika Romana [The Torch of Certainty of the Apostolic Roman Catholic Church] (in Tagalog). Quezon City: Ang Pasugo.
- Manalo, Felix Y. (n.d.). Ang Kahulugan at Kahalagahan sa Tao ng Pasko [The Meaning and Importance of Christmas to Man].
- Manalo, Felix Y. (n.d.). Ang Pagtawag ng Diyos ng mga sali't saling lahi mula ng una, ang Una at kasama ang Huli, Ako Nga [The Calling of God of generations since the past, the First and also the Last, I am.].
- Manalo, Felix Y. (n.d.). Ang Muling Pagsusugo at Ang Tandang Ikakikilala sa mga Taong Itinalaga ng Diyos na Katuparang Gawaing Ito sa Huling Araw. [The Recommissioning and the Distinguishing Sign of the People Assigned by God to Fulfill the Work during the End Times.].
- Manalo, Felix Y. (n.d.). Kung Sino Ang Tao Na Kumakatawan Sa Ibong Mandaragit [On Who Is The Person Identified As The Bird of prey.].
- Manalo, Felix Y. (n.d.). Ang Kahulugan Ng "Mga Wakas Ng Lupa" Ayon Sa Biblia [The Meaning Of "The Ends of the Earth" According To The Bible.].

== Notes ==
Religious titles
New title	Executive Minister of the Iglesia ni Cristo; 1914–1963	Succeeded by Eraño Manalo
