= Iglesia ni Cristo chapel, F. Manalo–San Juan =

Iglesia ni Cristo F. Manalo–San Juan Locale
- Lokal ng F. Manalo–San Juan (Filipino)
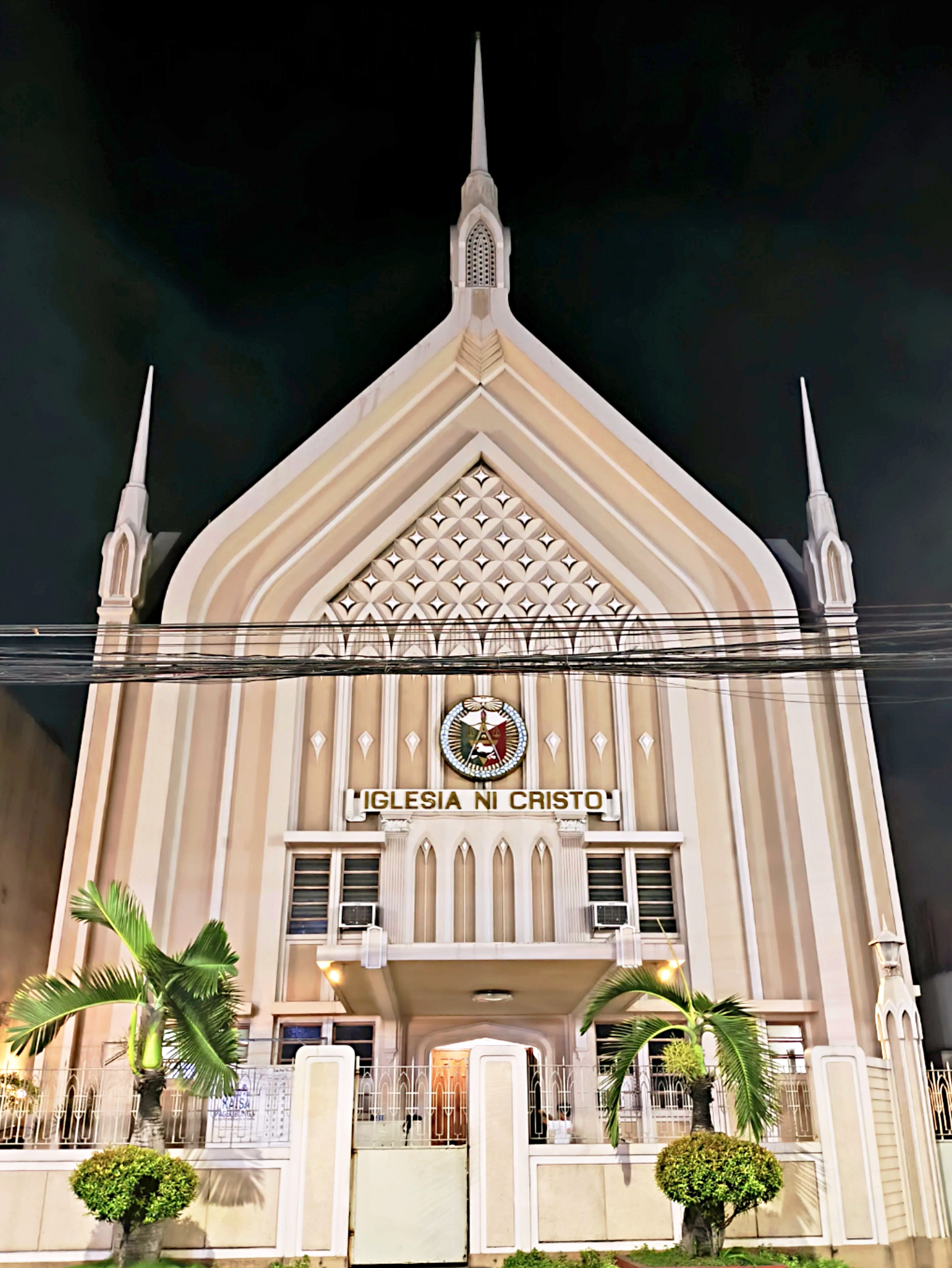
- Iglesia ni Cristo F. Manalo–San Juan Locale
- 14°35′46″N 121°01′57″E
- Location: Santa Lucia, San Juan, Metro Manila
- Country: Philippines
- Denomination: Iglesia ni Cristo

History
- Status: Locale Congregation

Architecture
- Functional status: active
- Architect: Juan Nakpil
- Style: Art Deco and Streamline Moderne
- Completed: 1952; 74 years ago

Specifications
- Capacity: 1,000

Administration
- District: Metro Manila East

The Iglesia ni Cristo Locale of F. Manalo–San Juan (Filipino: Lokal ng F. Manalo–San Juan), formerly Locale of Riverside (Filipino: Lokal ng Riverside) is a chapel and former central office complex of the Philippine-based Christian sect, Iglesia ni Cristo. Located in Barangay Santa Lucia, San Juan, it was completed in 1952, and it is the former central office complex and main house of worship of the church. The art-deco ensembles were designed by the national artist of architecture Juan Nakpil, who also built some of the standalone theaters in Rizal Avenue, UP Diliman Campus buildings and Quiapo Church.

== History ==
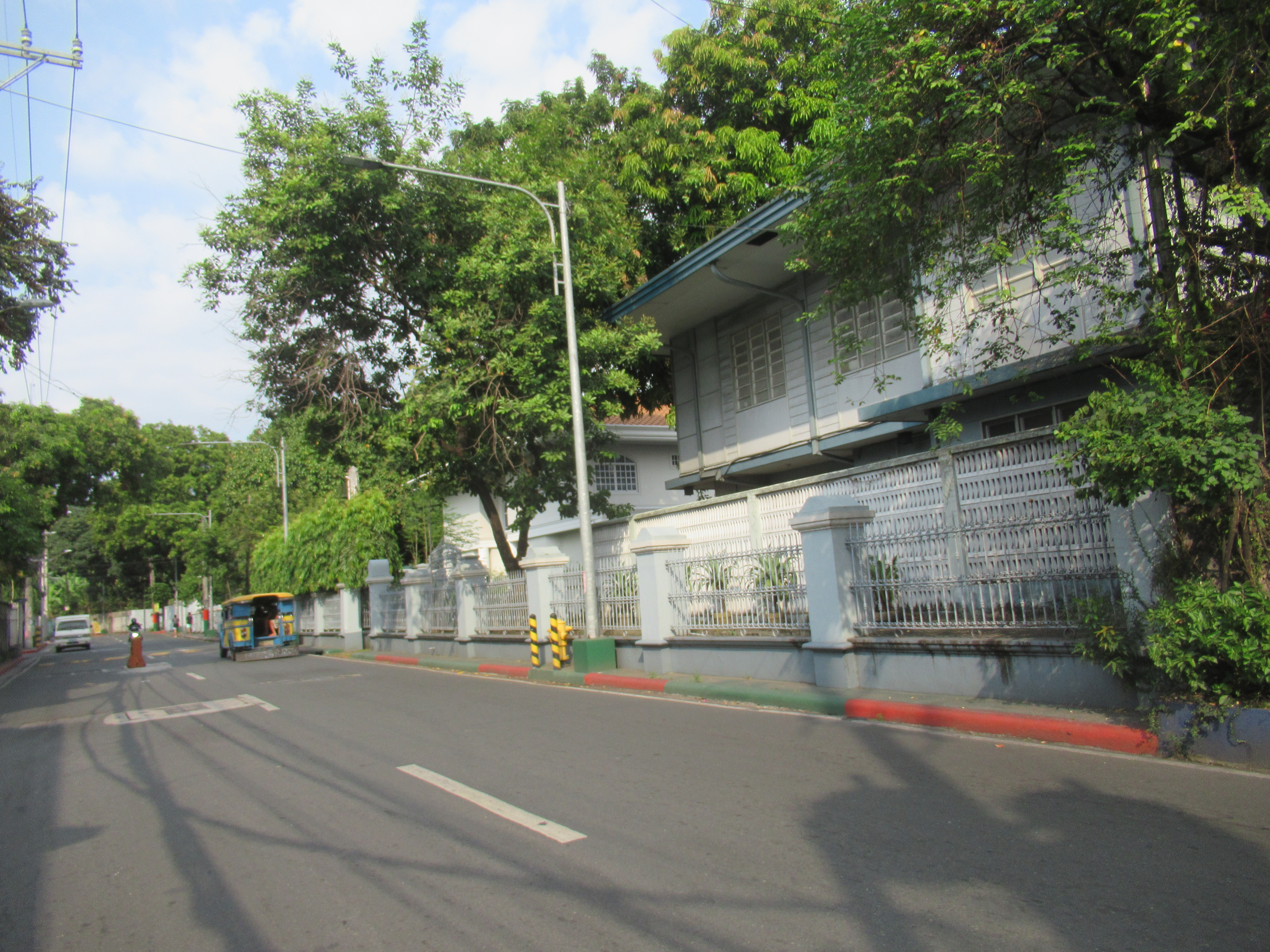
The street traversing the vicinity of this INC chapel was named after Felix Manalo.

The church administration was searching for a suitable location for the central office for the growing Iglesia ni Cristo under the leadership of Felix Y. Manalo. In 1925 the church administration moved from Tondo, Manila to San Juan, which was then a municipality of Rizal to accommodate more rooms for the church officers. Before the current site at Riverside, the San Juan Central Office was located at 42 Broadway Avenue, New Manila, San Juan (now part of Quezon City). Pasugo: God's Message Magazine, which was established in 1939, also began there. The Second World War prompted the Church Administration and Executive Minister's Family to transfer the Offices and Residences to the congregation of Tayuman in Santa Cruz, Manila to prevent sequestering the Church by Japanese forces, remaining there until 1947. The Locale Congregation of Riverside was established in 1948 when the Church Administration purchased a parcel of land on the area of Riverside Street, Barrio Maytunas, San Juan, land on which the Church planned not just for the building of a huge chapel but also for the Church's administrative offices, and its first chapel was just miles away from its future premises.

In early 1950s, Manalo hired architect Juan Nakpil to design the main house of worship, central office building and the Pastoral House which became home to Manalo and his family. The complex features sculptures by Francesco Monti, lush gardens and landscapes and a futuristic water tank.

The main chapel, simultaneously completed with adjacent buildings, was then the largest among the chapels of the church. It was patterned on theaters on which architect Nakpil worked.

Some of the historical events happened in the complex, like the election of council of ministers to Eraño Manalo as the successor of his father, Felix. In 1963, the last structure built inside the complex was the mausoleum-memorial of Felix Manalo, which was designed by architect Carlos A. Santos-Viola, the brother-in-law of architect Nakpil. In 1968, the Central Administration of the Church and its Departments were relocated to the FGM Building along Gil Puyat Avenue in Makati, while the construction of Iglesia ni Cristo Central Temple in Quezon City was ongoing, until the latter was opened few years later.

Currently, it is one of the oldest Locale Congregations of Metro Manila East and one of the Church's two Worship Buildings in the city of San Juan.
