= Iglesia ni Cristo chapel, Tondo =

Iglesia ni Cristo Tondo Locale
- Lokal ng Tundo (Filipino)
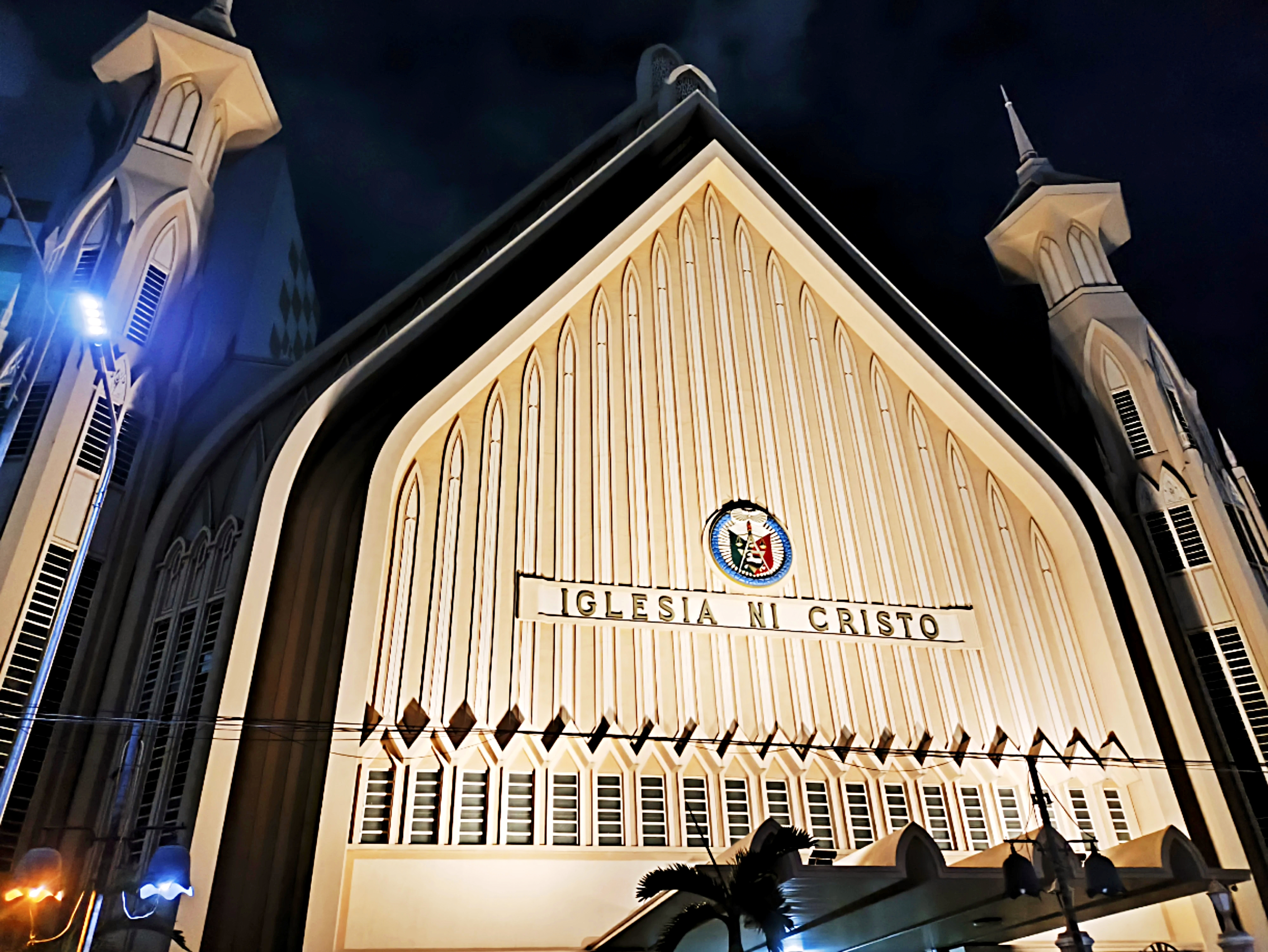
- Prior to the construction of the INC Lokal ng Templo Central (1984), the INC Lokal ng Tondo was the largest INC chapel in terms of seating capacity.
- Iglesia ni Cristo Tondo Locale
- 14°36′38″N 120°58′08″E
- Location: 1. Juan Luna cor. Moriones Sts, Tondo, Manila
- Country: Philippines
- Denomination: Iglesia ni Cristo

History
- Status: Locale Congregation and District Office of Manila Ecclesiastical District

Architecture
- Functional status: active
- Architect: Carlos A. Santos-Viola
- Completed: May 10, 1967; 59 years ago; Rededicated October 31, 2007; 18 years ago

Specifications
- Capacity: 6,000

Administration
- Metropolis: Maynila

The Iglesia Ni Cristo Locale of Tondo (Filipino: Lokal ng Tundo) is a chapel of the Philippine-based Christian religion, the Iglesia ni Cristo. Located along Juan Luna cor. Moriones Street in Tondo, Manila, it was completed on May 10, 1967, and was dedicated by Brother Erano Manalo. It is the second-largest chapel ever built by the church, with a capacity of 6,000. It is the largest ecclesiastical building in the city of Manila.

Designed by famed architect Carlos A. Santos-Viola, the church administration had the immense house of worship built for the largest locale congregation at that time.

== Founding Years (1915–1967) ==
The chapel was erected 52 years after the establishment of the original house of worship of the Locale of Tondo on Gabriela Street in 1915, which was made from nipa and bamboo. When this chapel gutted by Fire in 1926, the congregation was divided into Four Places of Worship – namely Dagupan, Raxabago, Rivera and Apitong, the latter being the original congregation which later separated, becoming the Locale of Tayuman.

== The Tondo Locale (1967–present) ==
Over the years, members in the three Congregations of Tondo grew rapidly by the hundreds. By 1965, the Church Administration decided to merge these three locales to form one unified locale, which would also include those served under the Tayuman congregation from eastern parts of Tondo and central Sta. Cruz and attended services there. Thus, work began on a new chapel for the now united Tondo Congregation.

After months of work, the chapel was dedicated on May 10, 1967, the 81st anniversary of the birth of the founder, Felix Manalo. Originally, it was designed to hold around 5,000 worshipers, accommodating some 3,000 people in the main hall and an additional 300 in a separate choir loft above the dais, and 2,700 in its balcony. It was renovated in 2007 to meet the new standards of the INC Construction and Engineering Department. The former cinema-style chairs in the main nave were replaced with wooden pews, and the seating capacity was increased by 1,000. The formerly-separate choir loft and dais were integrated. LED cove-lights were installed on geometrically designed ceiling. The floor was replaced with low-maintenance Granite Tiles from Italy. The former sliding main doors towards the lobby were replaced by two swing doors. The lobby was also renovated and expanded to accommodate more worshipers and guests. In 2021, LED Screen wall was placed at the wall of Choir Loft, in order to aide Maximum views during Hymn Singing and Preaching of Words.
