= New Era, Quezon City =

Barangay in Quezon City, Philippines

New Era
- Barangay
- Aerial view with the INC Central Temple

- Location of Barangay New Era within Metro Manila
- Coordinates: 14°39′48″N 121°03′29″E
- Country: Philippines
- Region: National Capital Region
- City: Quezon City
- District: 6th District of Quezon City
- Established: January 2, 1981

Government
  - Type: Barangay
  - Barangay Captain: Dario M. Orencia

Population (2020)
  - Total: 14,015
- Time zone: UTC+8 (PST)
- Postal Code: 1107
- Area Code: 2

New Era is a barangay in Quezon City, Metro Manila, Philippines. It is noted for its dominant Iglesia ni Cristo population.

== Geography ==
Tandang Sora Avenue is situated on the northern and eastern boundary of New Era. The barangay is also bounded on the southeast by Commonwealth Avenue and on the south by Central Avenue. Sitio Mabilog is situated on its southwest boundary while lots no. 689, 680, 678, and 689 of the Piedad Estate and San Antonio Subdivision delineates New Era's eastern boundaries.

== History ==
New Era was created by Presidential Decree No. 1760 issued by President Ferdinand Marcos on January 2, 1981. The barangay was carved from a portion of barangay Culiat. The Central Temple of Iglesia ni Cristo, which is situated within the barangay, was inaugurated in 1984.

== Demographics ==
About 95 percent of the barangay's population consists of adherents of the Iglesia ni Cristo. The non-Trinitarian Christian church host some of its significant facilities in the barangay such as its Central Office, Central Temple, Eagle Broadcasting Corporation, headquarters of INCTV, Iglesia Ni Cristo School for Ministers and the New Era University. Part of the barangay is the Milton Hills Subdivision, which was originally developed by Roman Catholics.
