= National Shrine of Our Lady of Lourdes =

Catholic church in Quezon City, Philippines

Lourdes Church
- National Shrine and Parish of Our Lady of Lourdes
- Pambansáng Dambana at Parokya ng Mahal na Birhen ng Lourdes (Filipino); Santuario Nacional de Nuestra Señora de Lourdes (Spanish)
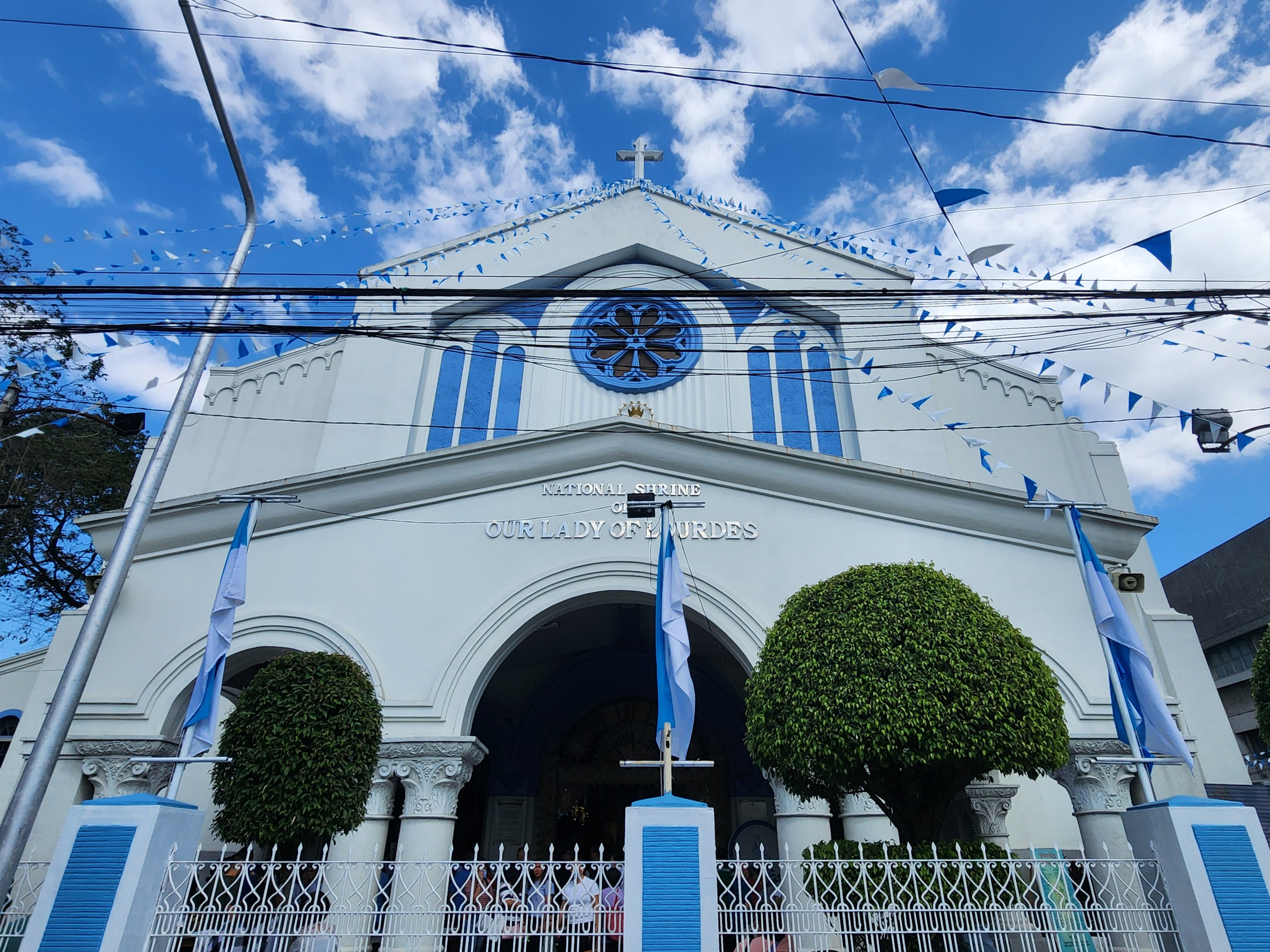
- The shrine in February 2024
- Lourdes Church
- 14°37′49″N 120°59′49″E
- Location: Santa Mesa Heights, Quezon City
- Country: Philippines
- Denomination: Catholic
- Sui iuris church: Latin Church
- Tradition: Roman Rite
- Religious order: Friars Minor Capuchin
- Website: www.nsoll.ph

History
- Former name: Parish of Santa Teresita del Niño Jesus
- Status: National shrine
- Founded: 1892; 134 years ago
- Founder: Capuchins
- Dedication: Our Lady of Lourdes
- Consecrated: August 15, 1951; 74 years ago

Architecture
- Functional status: Active
- Architectural type: Church building
- Style: Neo-classic
- Years built: c. 1892, 1897‍–‍1910 (dest. 1945); 1950–1951
- Groundbreaking: January 30, 1950; 76 years ago
- Completed: August 15, 1951; 74 years ago

Specifications
- Materials: Reinforced concrete

Administration
- Province: Manila
- Diocese: Cubao
- Deanery: San Pedro Bautista
- Parish: Our Lady of Lourdes

Clergy
- Rector: Uldarico C. Camus

The National Shrine and Parish of Our Lady of Lourdes, commonly known as the Lourdes Church, is a Catholic national shrine in Quezon City, Philippines. The church is administered by the Order of Friars Minor Capuchin of the Philippine ecclesiastical province and under the Vicariate of San Pedro Bautista of the Latin Church diocese of Cubao.

The original church was located in Intramuros until it was destroyed during World War II. The venerated Marian image (Lourdes de Manila) enshrined from 1896 was hidden and spared during the bombing.

Dedicated to the Blessed Virgin Mary under the title of Our Lady of Lourdes, Pope Francis granted a decree of canonical coronation towards the image on September 5, 2019. The image was crowned on August 22, 2020.

== History ==
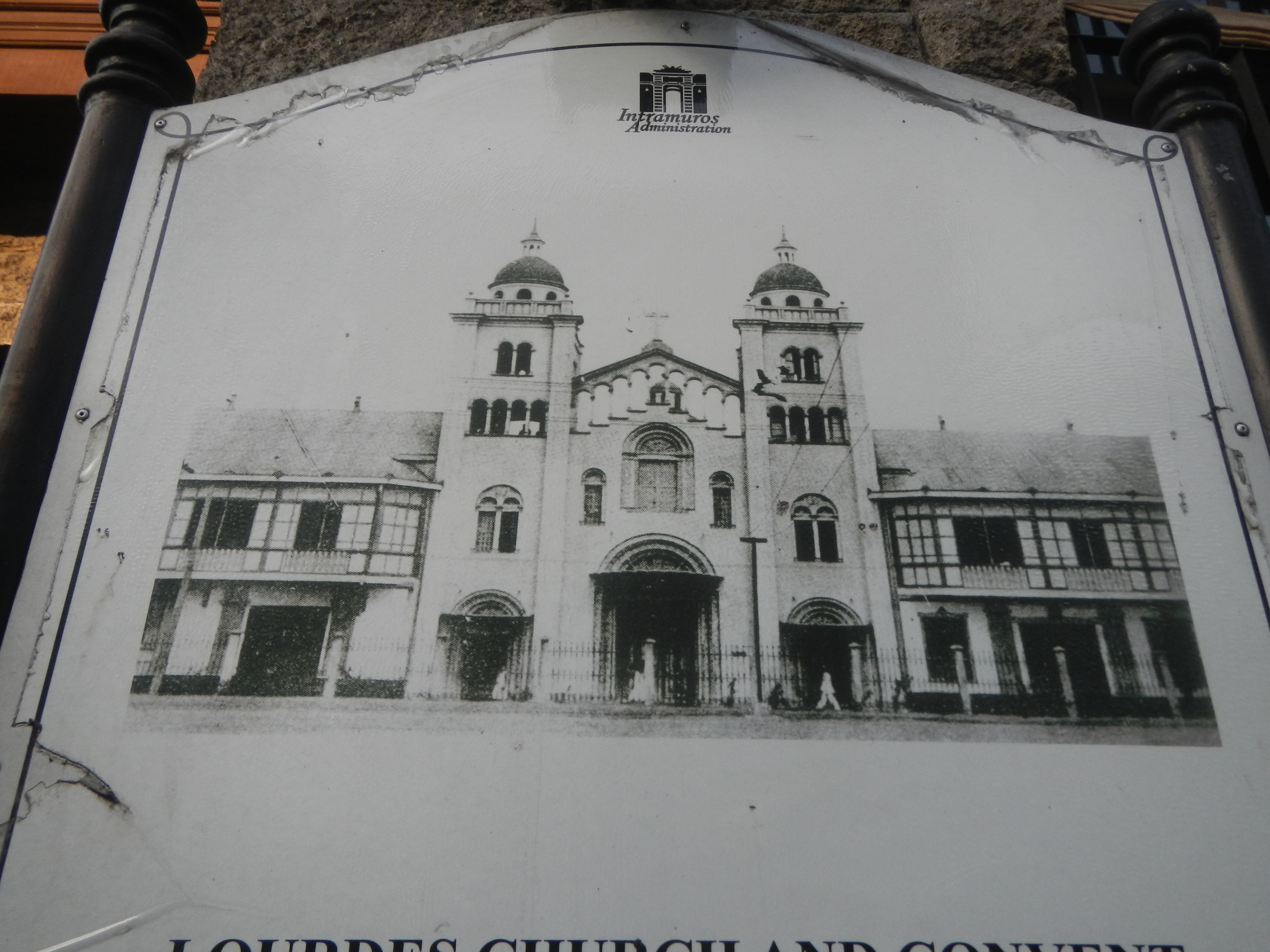
Marker at the site of the original church in Intramuros, showing its façade.

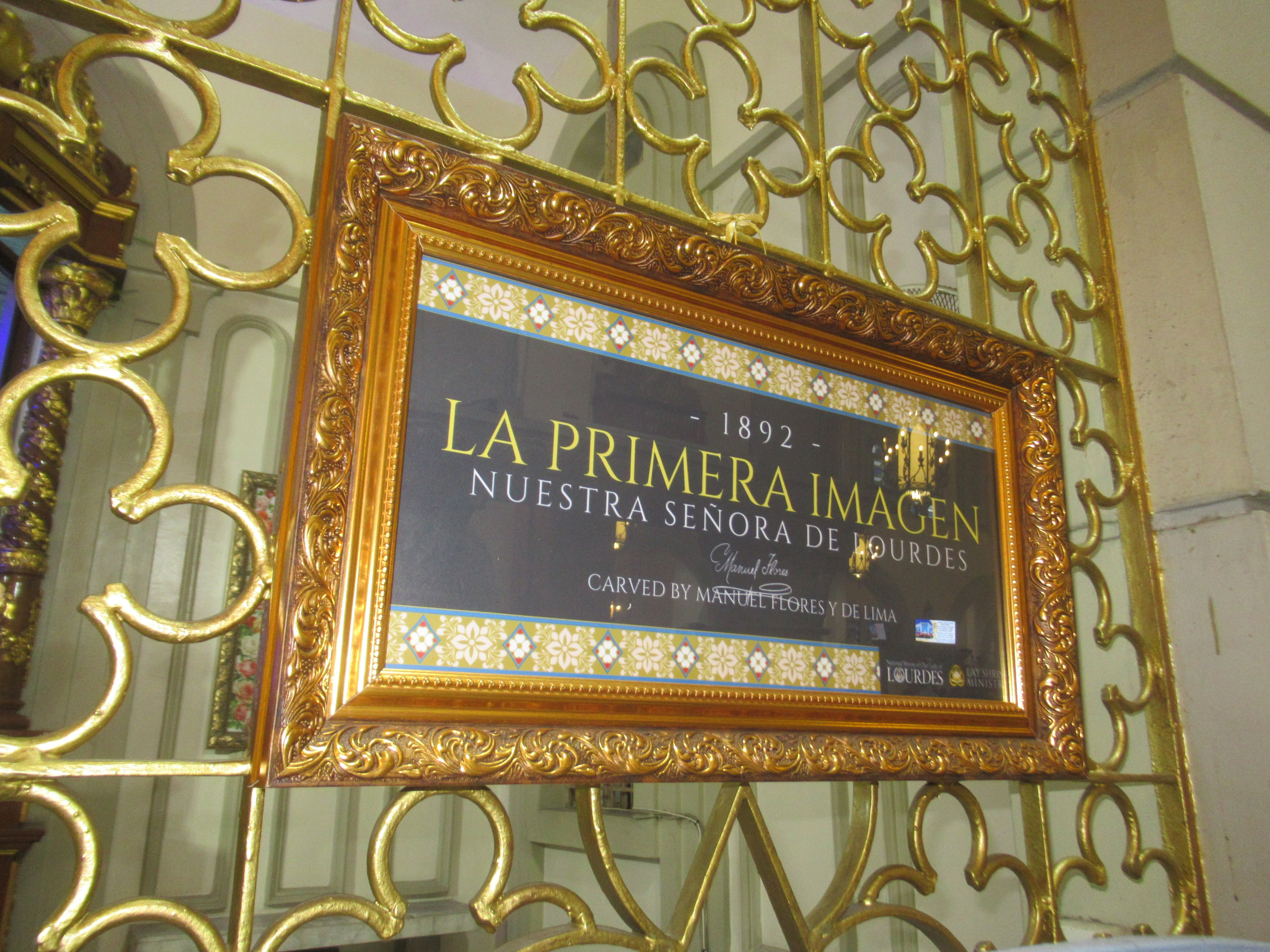
Historical plaque commemorating sculptor Manuel Flores y de Lima

Father Bernardo de Cieza commissioned Manuel Flores y de Lima to sculpt a statue of Our Lady of Lourdes (named "La Primera Imagen") intended for the grotto of the convento. This was later placed inside the chapel at the urging of those who attended the blessings of the Capuchins. The first novena to Our Lady of Lourdes took place the following year. In 1894, due to the growing devotion to Our Lady of Lourdes, a second image by Flores (“La Venerada Imagen”) was commissioned, under the guidance of Father Antonio de Valencia, and funded by a certain Doña Carmen Macan. The Venerada image was completed in time for the feast day in 1896, while La Primera Imagen was brought inside the convento.

After three months, a dying young woman who was diagnosed with a tumor in her lungs, Doña Martina Azucena, was brought to the chapel after hearing of the miracles and cures of Our Lady of Lourdes. She implored the Blessed Mother’s intercession for her healing and after a full hour of praying in front of the Venerada, she felt strength slowly return and walked out of the church with ease. She also testified that she had consumed nothing but Lourdes water for 28 days prior. Each year since on May 16, she had a solemn Mass offered in thanksgiving for her cure in 1896.

In September 1897, architects Don Federico Soler and Don José García Morón began enlargement of the chapel with help from donations from a group led by García, Doña Pelagia Velásquez, and Doña Carmen Macan. On May 1, 1898, the United States Navy arrived in Manila, easily destroying the small fleet of the Spanish Navy. The American occupiers demanded Spain’s surrender, and threatened an attack that would destroy life and property within 24 hours. The next day, hearing of the looming threat of American bombardment of the city of Manila, Capuchin superior Fr. Alfonso de Morentín prostrated in front of the Venerada to implore they be saved from destruction, and in return he solemnly vowed to dedicate their new church to her. The deadline passed, and both city and church were spared.

On September 24, 1898, with the approval of Pedro Payo y Piñeiro, archbishop of Manila, the new church was officially consecrated, with her as the titular patroness. The new church to Our Lady of Lourdes was inaugurated on February 3, 1910.

When World War II broke out, both images of Our Lady of Lourdes were hidden in the sacristy of San Agustín Church together with several precious artefacts on February 5, 1945. It was left behind when the women of Intramuros were freed on February 23 and was retrieved a month later. The image was subsequently brought to the Santísimo Rosario Chapel of the University of Santo Tomás, and later moved to Santa Teresita Chapel on Mayon Street in Quezon City.

On February 10, 1951, the two images of Our Lady of Lourdes were transferred to the new church from their temporary home on Mayon Street. The church was consecrated on August 15, 1951, by Archbishop of Manila Gabriel Reyes, who officiated the Mass attended by many important people including Senate President Don Mariano Jesús Cuenco, and the daughter of Spanish ambassador to the Philippines Antonio Gullón y Gómez.

Currently, the shrine's altar, sanctuary and retablo are undergoing renovation and retrofitting.

== Organization ==
=== Parochial jurisdiction ===
The church is located on Kanlaon Street at the corner of N.S. Amoranto Street in the Santa Mesa Heights neighbourhood of the La Loma district of Quezon City. Its current boundaries are:

- G. Araneta Avenue (North Bound)
- Sta. Catalina Street (West Bound)
- A. Bonifacio Avenue (South Bound)
- Blumentritt Street (South Bound)
- Maria Clara Street (East Bound)

Six parishes have been erected within the former parochial jurisdiction of the shrine, namely:

- Our Lady of Perpetual Help, Manila (1951)
- Santo Domingo, Quezon City (1972)
- Santa Teresita, Quezon City (1977)
- Santa Perpetua, Quezon City (1975)
- San Roque, Manila (1987)
- Most Holy Redeemer, Quezon City (1994)

=== Clergy ===
==== Current priests ====
- Uldarico C. Camus (parish priest)
- Alfredo G. Micua (parochial vicar)
- Antonio B. Ala II (guardian)

==== Former priests ====
- Fernando de Erasun (1942–1951)
- Pedro de Azcoitia (1951–1953)
- Fernando de Erasun (1953–1954)
- Sebastian de Sanguesa (1954–1961)
- Angel de los Arcos (1961–1967)
- Sebastian de Sanguesa (1967–1976)
- Jesus Salcedo (1976–1979)
- Troadio de los Santos (1979–1982)
- Jose Luis Arrieta (1982–1991)
- Alfredo Micua (1991–1994)
- Troadio de los Santos (1994–2002)
- Mario G. Dorado (2002–2005)
- Ramon C. Atanacio (2005–2011)
- Chito B. Bartolo (2011–2014)
- William T. Bustamante (2014–2017)
- Cesar F. Acuin (2017–2021)
- Jefferson E. Agustin (2021–2024)

== Gallery ==
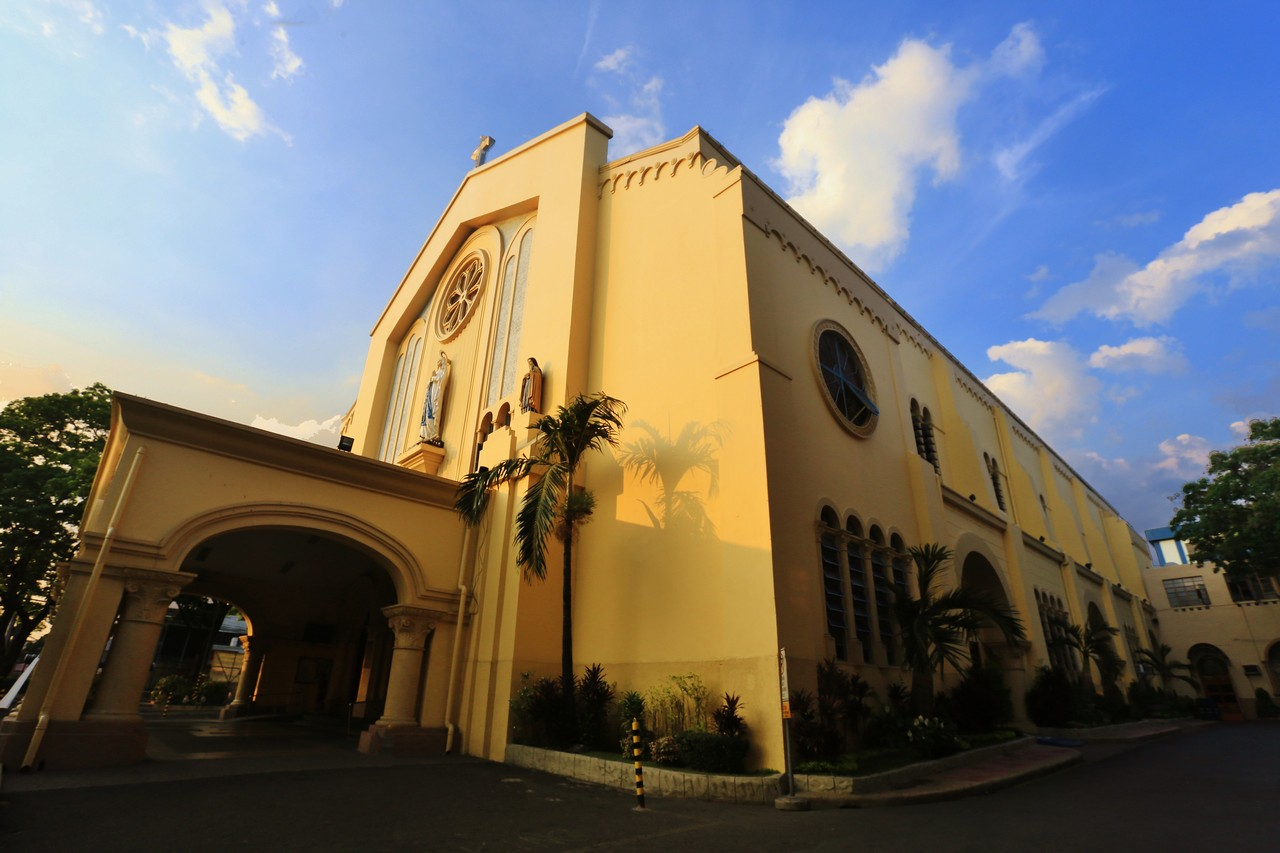
East face side of the shrine)

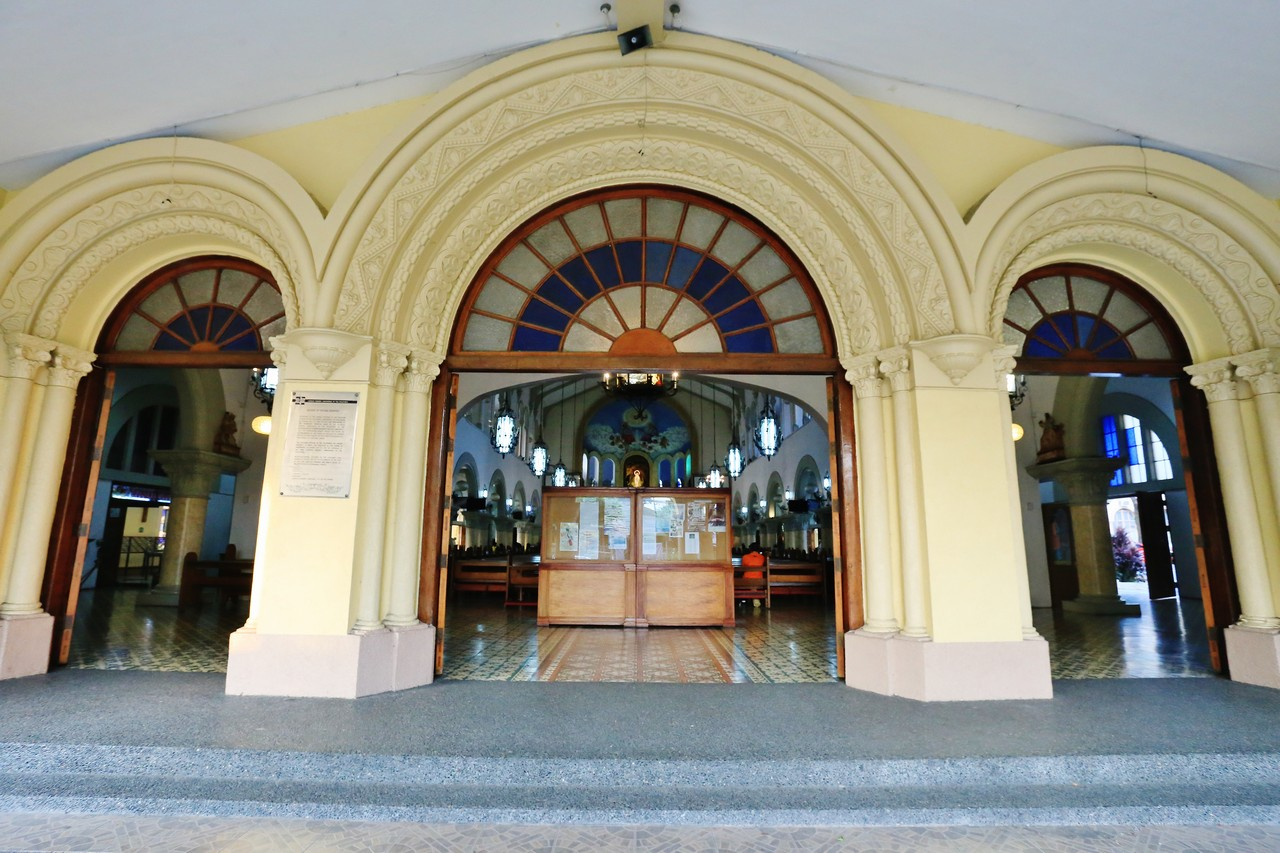
The main portal

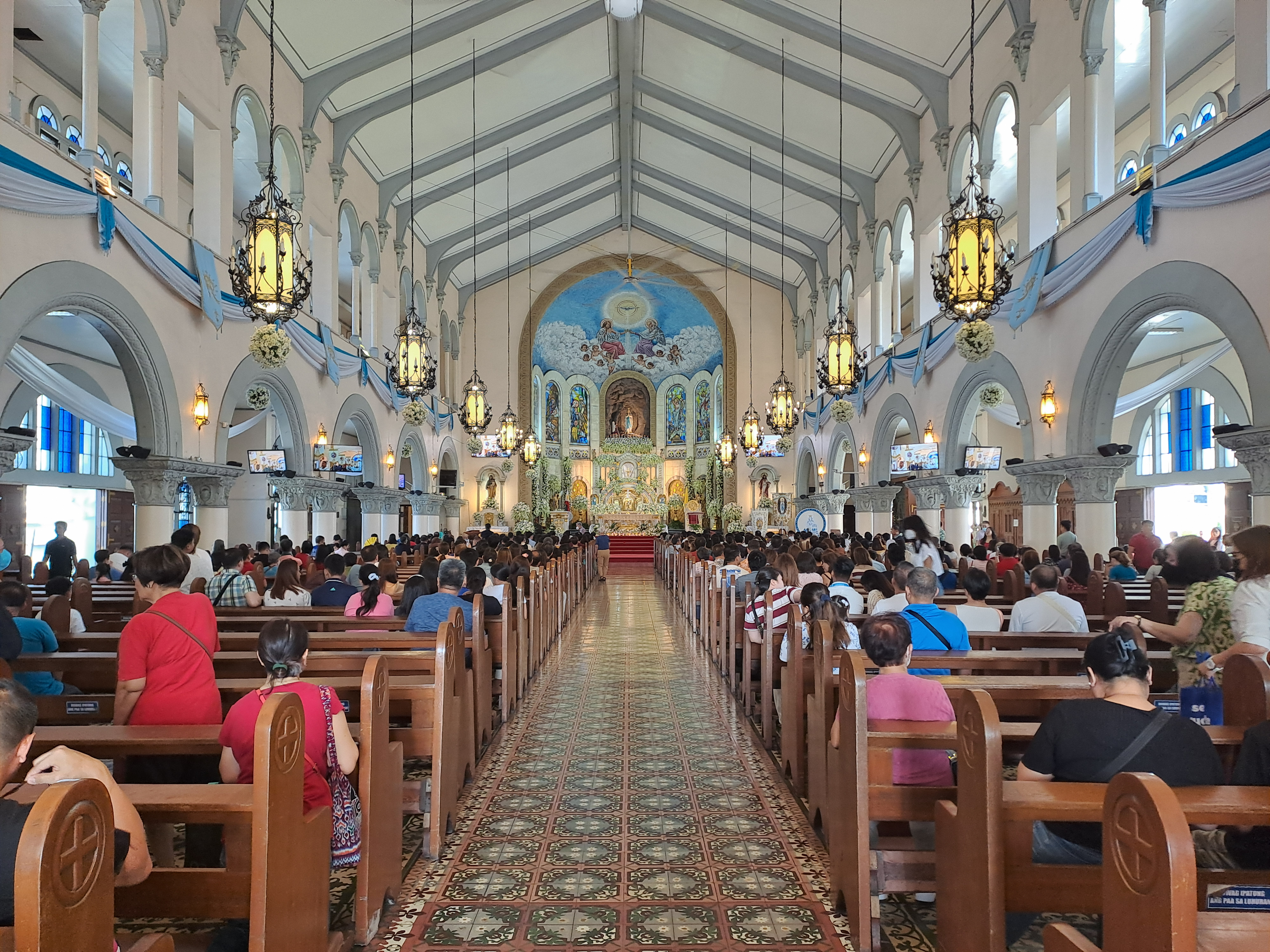
Nave in 2024

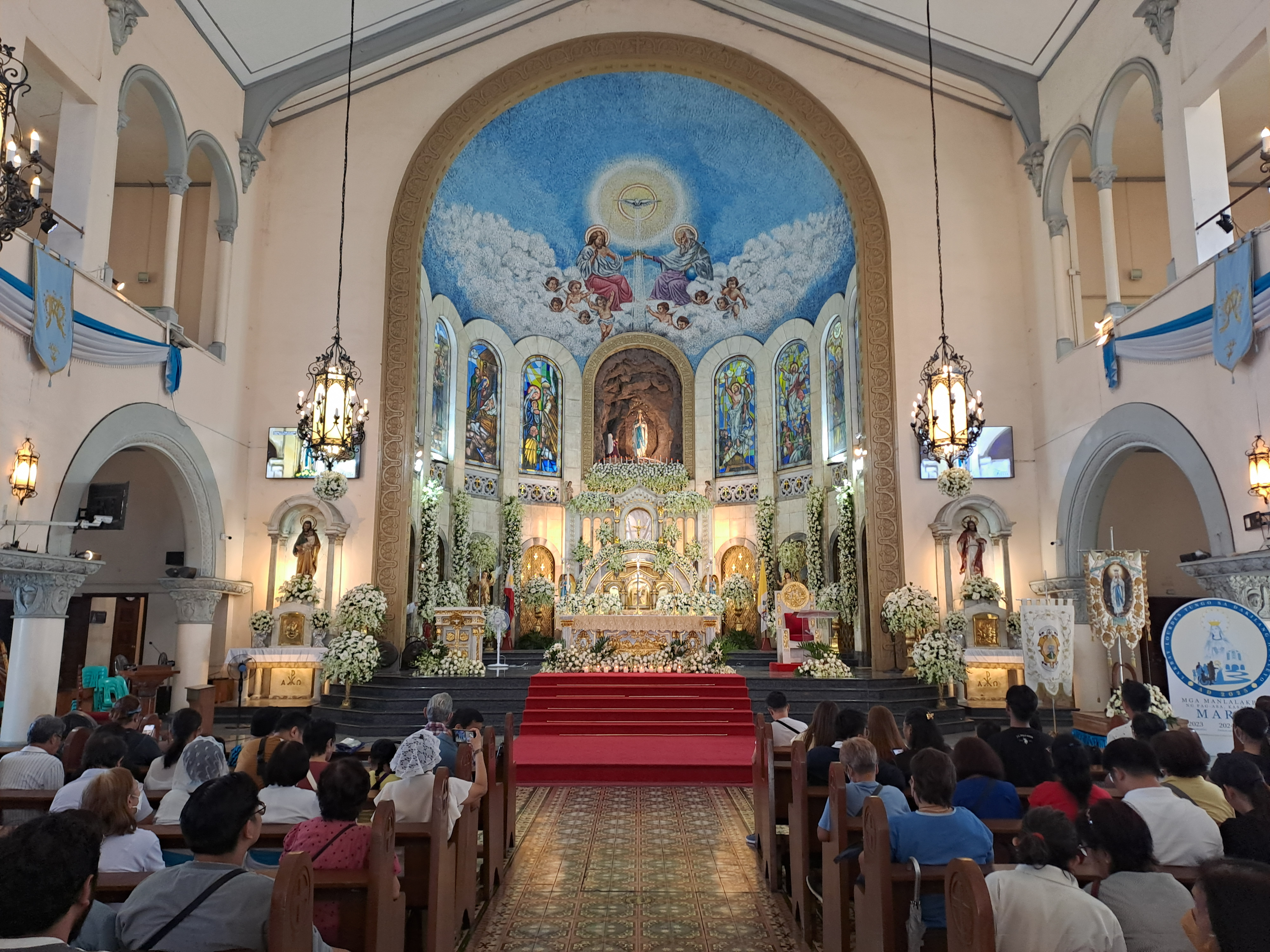
Closeup of the sanctuary and altar

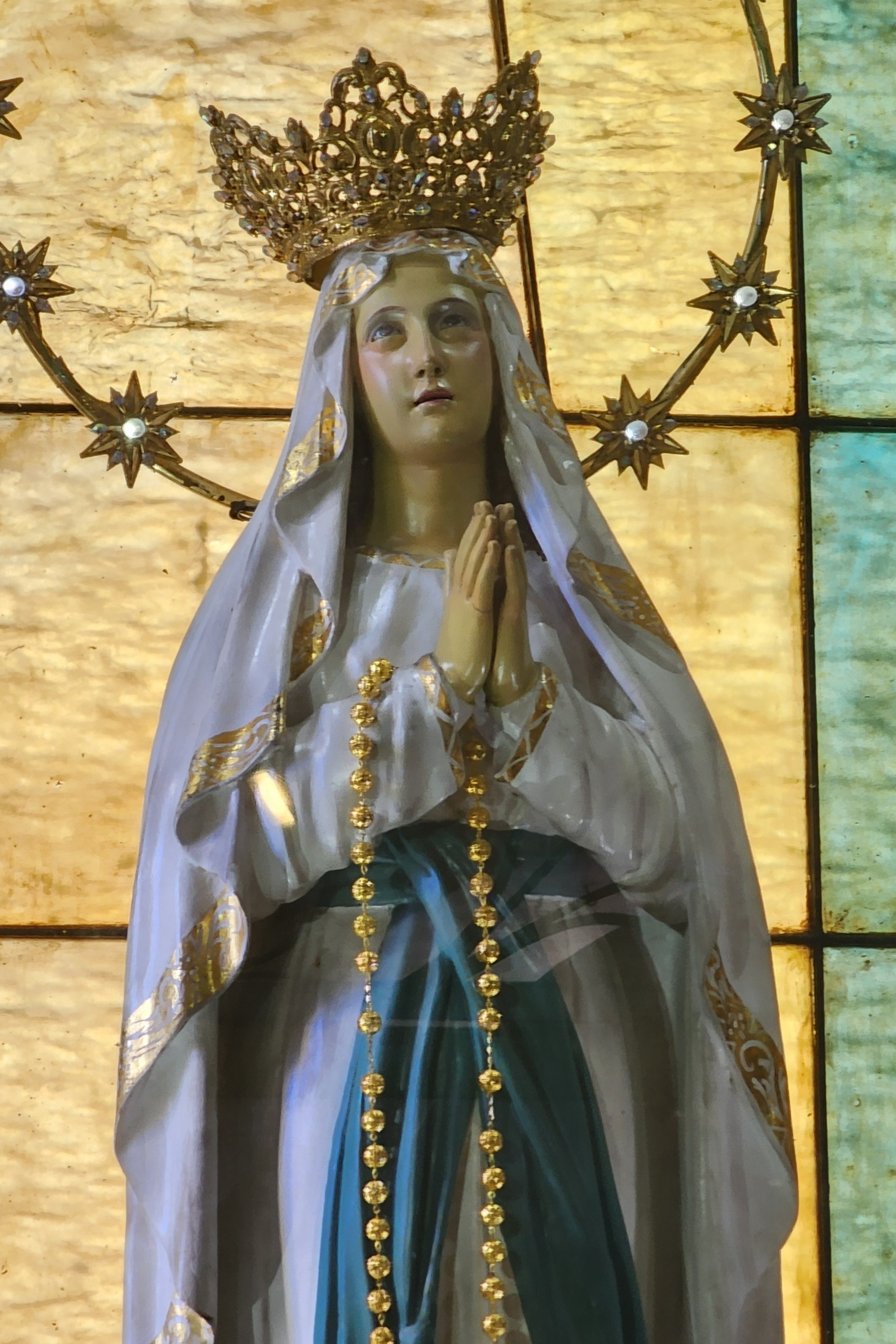
La Primera Imagen of Our Lady of Lourdes, is kept in the baptistery

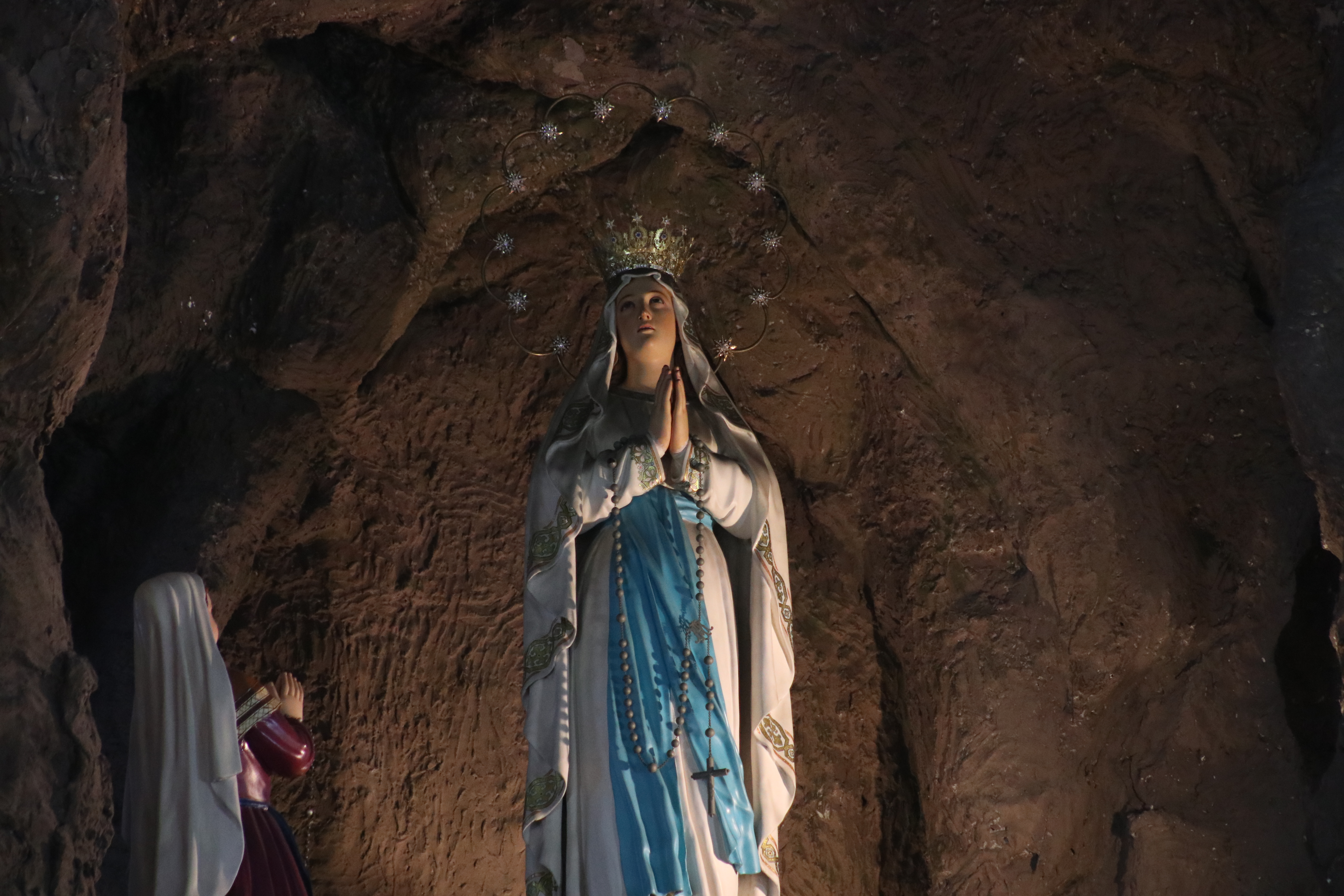
La Venerada y Coronada Imagen with Saint Bernadette Soubirous, enshrined above the high altar
