= Juan Nakpil =

Filipino architect (1899–1986)

Juan F. Nákpil KGCR KSS
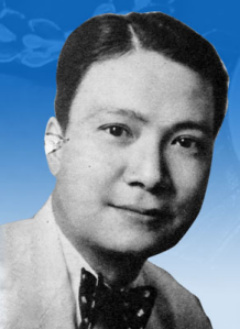
- Juan Nakpil from the Order of National Artists (NCCA)

Personal details
- Born: Juan Felipe Nákpil y de Jesús; May 26, 1899 Quiapo, Manila, First Philippine Republic
- Died: May 7, 1986 (aged 86) Manila, Philippines
- Spouse: Anita Noble y Agoncillo
- Children: 4
- Parent(s): Julio Nakpil (father); Gregoria de Jesús (mother)
- Education: University of the Philippines; University of Kansas; Fontainebleau School of Fine Arts
- Occupation: Architect
- Awards: Order of National Artists of the Philippines
- Religion: Roman Catholicism

Military service
- Allegiance: (Commonwealth of the Philippines) Philippines
- Branch/service: Philippine Army
- Rank: Major

Juan Felipe Nákpil, KGCR, KSS (born Juan Felipe Nákpil y de Jesús; May 26, 1899 – May 7, 1986) known as Juan Nákpil, was a Filipino architect, teacher and a community leader. In 1973, he was named one of the National Artists for architecture. He was regarded as the Dean of Filipino Architects.

== Early life ==
He was the eighth child of the Philippine Revolution veterans Julio Nákpil and Gregoria de Jesús (who married the former after the death of her first husband Andrés).

== Education ==
He studied engineering at the Benguet State University and later, at the University of Kansas, where he received his bachelor's degree in Mechanical Engineering. He then studied architecture at the Fontainebleau School of Fine Arts in France upon the recommendation of Jean Jacques Haffner, one of his professors at the Harvard Graduate School of Architecture.

== Career ==
Nákpil worked at Andres Luna de San Pedro's architectural firm (1928) and at Don Gonzalo Puyat & Sons, opening his own architectural firm in 1930. Among Nákpil's works are San Carlos Seminary, Geronimo de los Reyes Building, Iglesia ni Cristo Riverside Locale (Now F. Manalo, San Juan) and Iglesia Ni Cristo - Locale of Caloocan, Magsaysay Building, Rizal Theater, Capitol Theater, Captain Pepe Building, Manila Jockey Club, Rufino Building, Philippine Village Hotel, University of the Philippines Administration and University Library, and the Rizal Shrine in Calamba, Laguna.

He also designed the International Eucharistic Congress altar and improved the Quiapo Church in 1930 by erecting a dome and a second belfry. The church burned down in 1929 prior to Nákpil's redesign of the building. In the 1930s to the 1940s, Nákpil and his fellow architects Andres Luna de San Pedro, Fernando Ocampo and Pablo Antonio started the period of modern architecture in the Philippines. Nákpil and others also established the Philippine College of Design in 1941 but the institution did not survive the Second World War. In 1952, President Quirino appointed Nákpil to be a member of the National Rizal Day Committee. He was hailed as a National Artist for Architecture in 1973. On November 23, 1936, Nákpil was on a list of Inactive Philippine Army Officers as an Infantry Major.

Nákpil and his family company Juan F. Nákpil & Sons, together with the contractors United Construction Company, Inc. were part of the most prominent landmark case for fortuitous events filed by the Philippine Bar Association (PBA). The PBA through its counsel, the Jose W. Diokno Law Office, which was represented by Sen. Diokno himself, won the case against Nákpil in the trial court, which was just affirmed in the Court of Appeals and later elevated to the Supreme Court. Nákpil lost that final case in 1986, and was liable for damages to the PBA, whose building was destroyed during an earthquake way back in 1968.

== Projects ==
=== Theaters ===
- Gaiety Theater, Manila (now inactive)
- Rizal Theater (since demolished; the site is occupied by Makati Shangri-La, Manila)
- Capitol Theater (now inactive)
- University of the Philippines Theater and carillon tower

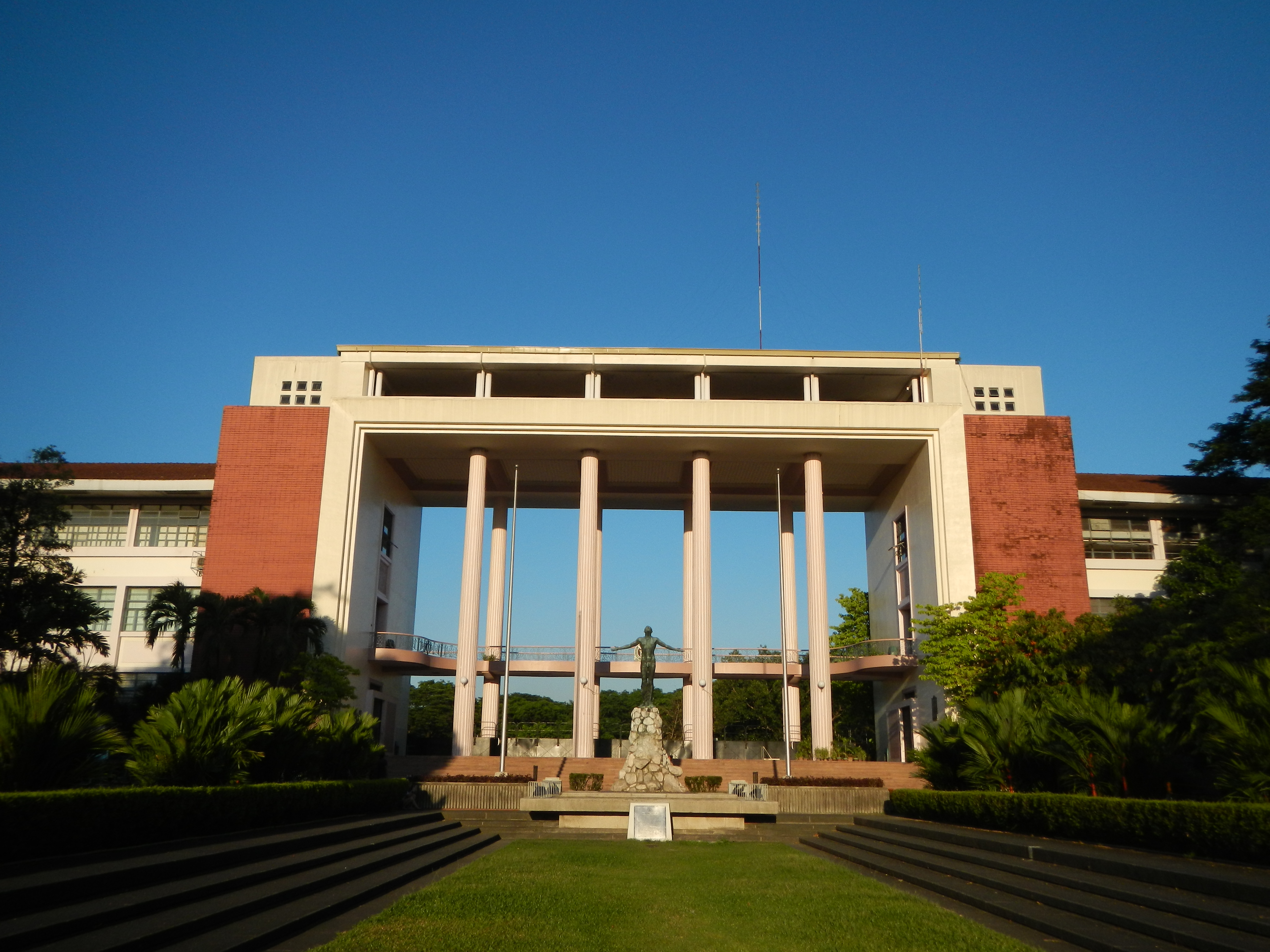
University of the Philippines, Administration Building or "Quezon Hall"

=== Other buildings ===
- Arellano University Building
- Boy Scouts of the Philippines (BSP) National Headquarters
- Philippine Trust Co. Building (at what is now Plaza Lacson)
- Geronimo Delos Reyes Building
- Capitan Pepe Building
- Manila Jockey Club
- San Carlos Seminary
- Philippine Village Hotel (closed in 2000)
- University of the Philippines Administration & Library
- Rizal Shrine
- Gala-Rodriguez Ancestral House
- University of the Philippines Los Baños Old Humanities Building
- Philippine National Bank building - Visayas

=== Special projects ===
- Main Altar for the Second National Eucharistic Congress of the Philippines
- The Mati Obelisk (The Pylon)

== Personal life and family ==
Nákpil married Anita Noble y Agoncillo, who came from Lemery, Batangas. Noble was the granddaughter of Doña Marcela Mariño Agoncillo and became the first Miss Philippines after the Manila Carnival Queen was reimagined as Miss Philippines in 1926.

The two had three sons, namely Ariston, Francisco, Eulogio, and two daughters, namely Annie, and Edith. The three sons later became architects and joined Nákpil in the family firm, which was renamed Juan F. Nákpil & Sons, and later renamed Nákpil, Nákpil, Nákpil, and Nákpil in 1972.

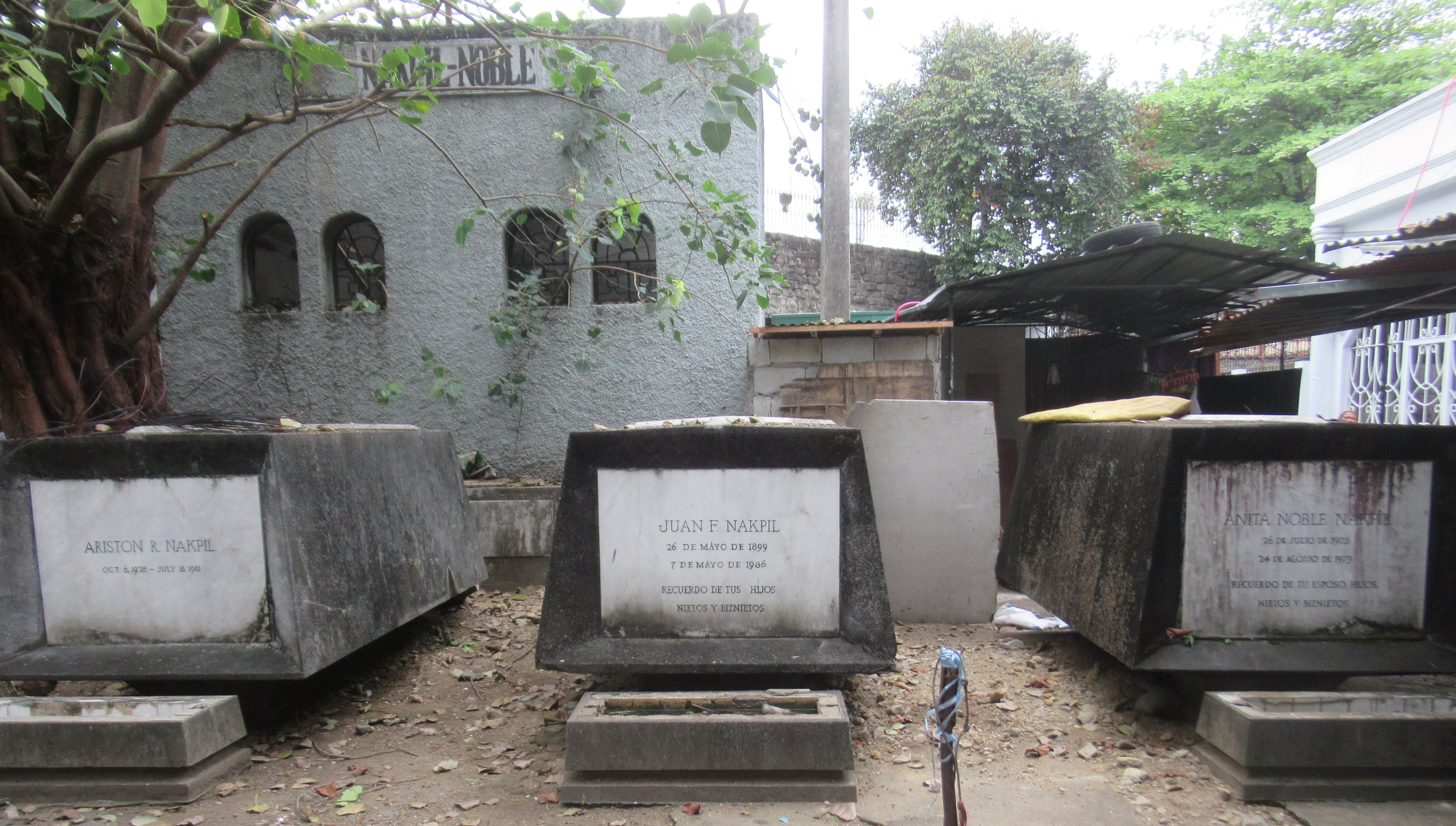
Ariston, Juan Nakpil & Anita Agoncillo Noble Nakpil's graves at Manila North Cemetery.

In the 1970s, Ariston Román Nákpil, alongside fifteen other professional founded the Chamber of Real Estate and Builders' Associations (CREBA), a non-government, umbrella organization of firms and professionals involved in real estate and real property. Annie Nákpil married Renato "Nats" Tañada, son of former Senator and "father of Philippine politics", Lorenzo Tañada. Both Annie and Renato were posthumously honored as "patriot-members" of the Ninoy Aquino Movement on the 29th death anniversary of Benigno Aquino Jr. in 2012. Edith Nákpil-Rabat was crowned Miss Philippines in 1955 and later served as a member of the Batasang Pambanasa under the Marcos regime. She married Davao Oriental governor Francisco Rabat and was known as the "First Lady of Davao".

Nákpil died on May 7, 1986, aged 87. He was arranged a state funeral and was buried at the Manila North Cemetery. His remains and that of his wife, Anita Noble, were later cremated and transferred to The Heritage Park, Taguig.

== Awards ==
The Philippines:

- : National Artist of the Philippines (1973)
- : Presidential Medal of Merit (1955)
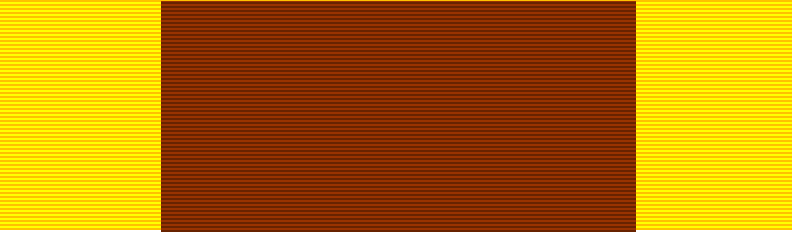
- Supreme Commander and Knight Grand Cross of the Order of the Knights of Rizal

Holy See:

- Knight of the Order of St. Sylvester, knighted by Pope Pius XII.
