= Carlos A. Santos-Viola =

Filipino architect (1912–1994)

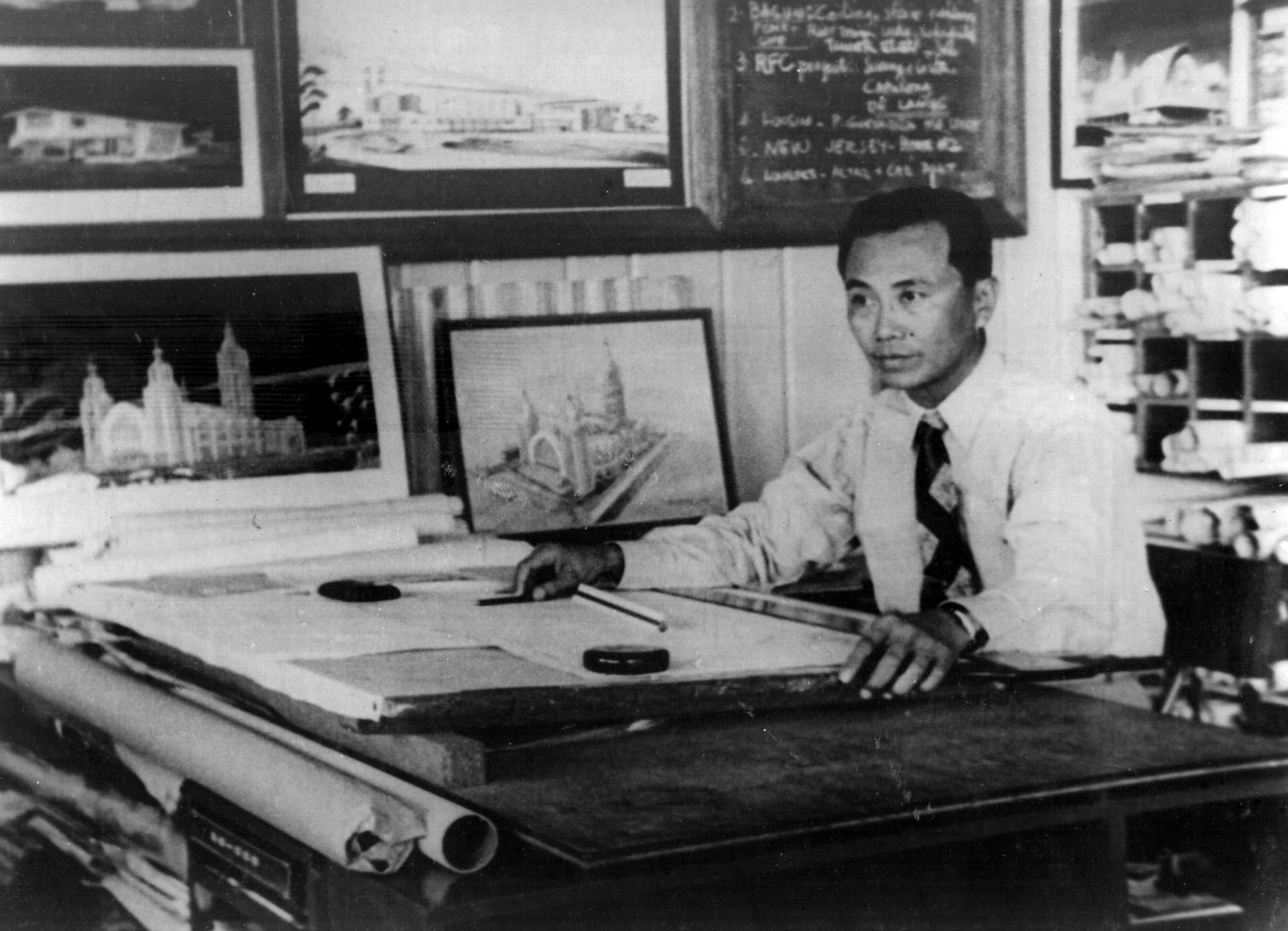
- Born: Carlos Santos-Viola y Antonio; April 8, 1912; San Miguel, Bulacan, Philippine Islands
- Died: July 31, 1994 (aged 82); Quezon City, Philippines
- Education: Ateneo de Manila; University of Santo Tomas
- Occupation: Architect
- Buildings: INC Central Temple
- Projects: Iglesia ni Cristo chapels

Carlos Antonio Santos-Viola FPIA (born Carlos Santos-Viola y Antonio; April 8, 1912 – July 31, 1994) was an architect in the Philippines. He is best known for designing and building churches for the Christian sect Iglesia ni Cristo (INC).

== Early life and education ==
Carlos Santos-Viola was born on April 9, 1912 in San Miguel, Bulacan to Nemecio Santos-Viola and Manuela Antonio. He studied at the Ateneo de Manila before studying architecture at the University of Santo Tomas. Santos-Viola passed the architecture board examiniations in 1938 and was tenth top placing taker.

== Career ==
Santos-Viola worked in the office of Juan Nakpil after graduating. There he met Juan's youngest sister, Caridad, his future wife and mother to his children: Rosario, Milagros, Paz, Lourdes, and Carlos, Jr.

Shortly after World War II, he opened his office in partnership with Alfredo J. Luz. In 1955, both parted ways and practiced separately.

His first exposure to the INC group was executed under Nakpil's company through the Bishop's Palace in San Juan, Metro Manila. INC gave the subsequent project directly to Santos-Viola. Although common elements may be visible, his designs were distinct from one another. Each structure was created on functionality that was built with integrity, adorned with 20th-century geometric forms, and garnished with Gothic Revival and Baroque lines. Among those completed designs was the INC's central office in Quezon City. Architect Santos-Viola was the only Filipino Architect who designed churches that were built all over the Philippines.

Carlos was a lifelong devout Catholic. He ministered for the Our Lady of Lourdes Church in Quezon City and was frequently invited to join the INC but repeatedly declined to join due to ideological differences. He also taught architecture at the college where he graduated and helped found the Philippine Institute of Architects in 1938.

== Gallery ==
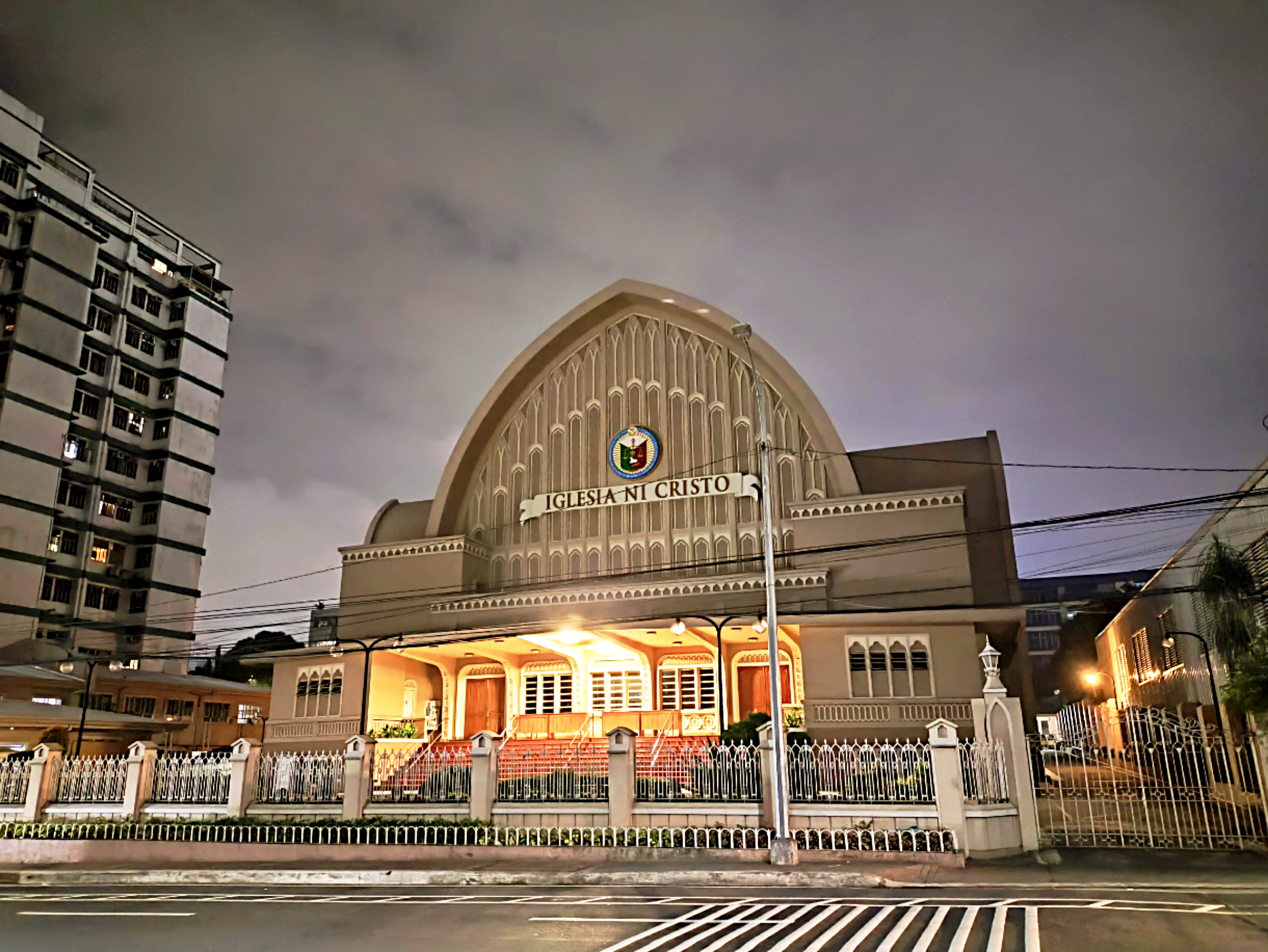
Completed in 1954, the Iglesia ni Cristo (INC) Lokal ng Cubao in Quezon City is the first major chapel designed by Santos-Viola for the INC. With its distinct architecture, it is believed to have inspired future designs of INC chapels all over the Philippines.

The Iglesia ni Cristo Central Temple in Commonwealth Avenue, Diliman, Quezon City was the largest Chapel designed by Santos-Viola.

Another unique design of Santos-Viola was the INC Central Office viewed through the spire of the Central Temple while under construction.
