= INC Central Temple =

Central temple of the Iglesia ni Cristo in Quezon City

Iglesia ni Cristo Central Temple
- Templo Central (Filipino)
- The INC Central Temple
- Iglesia ni Cristo Central Temple
- 14°39′48.0″N 121°03′55.4″E
- Location: New Era, Quezon City
- Country: Philippines
- Denomination: Iglesia ni Cristo

History
- Status: Central Temple

Architecture
- Functional status: active
- Architect: Carlos A. Santos-Viola
- Architectural type: Neo-Gothic
- Years built: 4
- Completed: July 27, 1984; 42 years ago

Specifications
- Capacity: 7,000

Administration
- District: Central

The Iglesia ni Cristo Central Temple (Filipino: Templo Central) is the flagship temple of the Christian new religious movement Iglesia ni Cristo (INC). To date, it is the only INC building that is called a temple. Located along Commonwealth Avenue corner Central Avenue in Quezon City, it was completed on July 27, 1984, and is the biggest church/place of worship (bahay sambahan) of the INC in the country with a seating capacity of around 7,000 people.

== Background ==
Built on complex of the INC Central Office, the Temple was erected 15 years after the completion of the Central Office. It was designed to hold around 7,000 worshipers, accommodating some 3,000 in the main hall and 1,900 in its two side chapels. In addition, the ground floor sanctuary, connected to the main hall by video circuit, can accommodate an excess crowd of around 2,000. The sanctuary has a large baptistery pool designed for the simultaneous baptism of up to 600 people.

According to Architect Carlos A. Santos-Viola, in designing INC edifices, he had to create a style that "cannot be mistaken for any other sect except Iglesia." He also related how Manalo considered the Gothic architecture as the "most religious type of architecture" for its verticality, which was interpreted as "pointing towards heaven."

In 2014, a 20-ton pipe organ with 3,162 individual pipes custom made by American firm A.E. Schlueter Pipe Organ Company, was installed within the period of 14 months in time for the 30th anniversary celebrations of the Central Temple on July 27. The organ was first played during the special worship service held on July 5, 2014.

While standing both as seat of the Central District and the principal chapel of the Church, under its latter role also the ecclesiastical episcopal seat of the Executive Minister, it is organized in a similar manner as other locales, led by a Church-appointed resident minister, assisted by other ministers, assigned evangelical workers and lay staff.

== Gallery ==

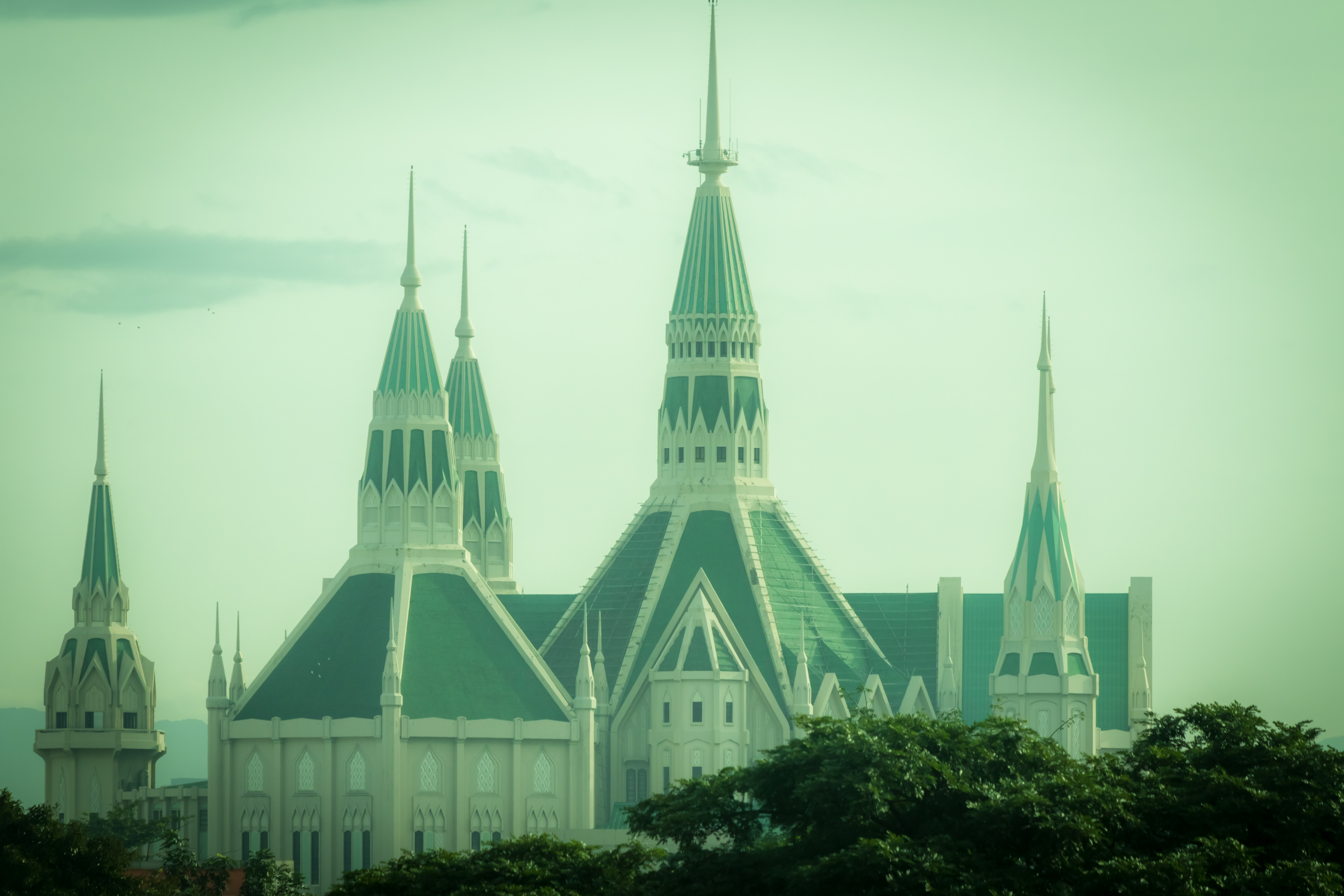
