= Bids for the 2018 Asian Games =

Bids for the 2018 Asian Games and Para Games
Overview
- XVIII Asian Games; III Asian Para Games
- Winner: Indonesia

Details
- Committee: OCA
- Election venue: Incheon, South Korea; 33rd OCA General Assembly

Map
- Location of the bidding cities

Important dates
- Bid: 17 July 2014
- Decision: 19 September 2014

Decision
- Winner: Indonesia
- Runner-up

Three cities submitted bids to host the 2018 Asian Games that were recognized by the Olympic Council of Asia (OCA). The games were awarded to Hanoi, Vietnam. The other shortlisted city was Surabaya, Indonesia. This came after Dubai and the United Arab Emirates pulled out of the running at the last minute during the Olympic Council of Asia (OCA) General Assembly meeting on November 8, 2012.

Additionally, the Games were originally scheduled for 2018, but during the Olympic Council of Asia's General Assembly meeting in Singapore on July 3, 2009, the committee decided to move the Games to the year before the 2020 Summer Olympics, which means that the 18th Asian Games would have been held in 2019.

However, on April 17, 2014, the Vietnamese Government announced it was withdrawing from hosting the Games.

On 19 September 2014, the Olympic Council of Asia executive board approved Indonesia as the host of the 2018 games. The Games were rescheduled from 2019 to 2018, since they will hold elections that year.

== First selection ==
=== Host city selection ===
Three cities: Hanoi, Surabaya and Dubai were shortlisted by the OCA as candidate to host the Games. They were inspected by an evaluation committee led by Vice President Lt Gen (R) Syed Arif Hasan who is also President of the Pakistan Olympic Association from 3 to 9 October. On November 8, 2012, the final selection was announced in Macau. With only two cities after Dubai withdrawal, Hanoi was selected as host by 29 votes to 14.

2018 Asian Games host city election
City	Country	Votes
Hanoi	Vietnam	29
Surabaya	Indonesia	14

=== Candidate cities ===
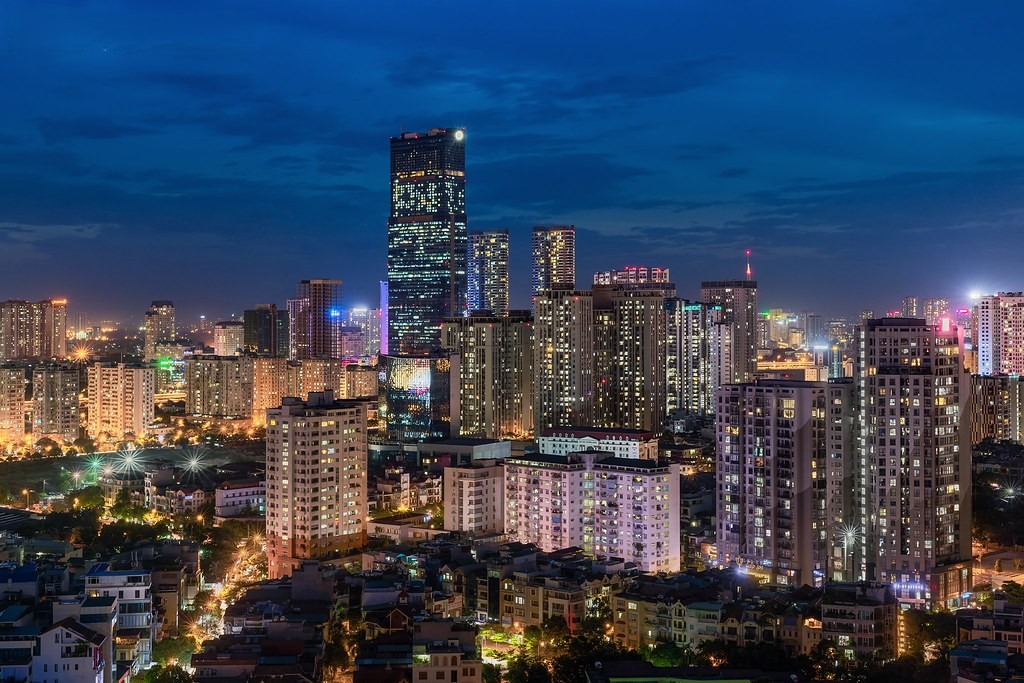
Skyscrapers in Hanoi

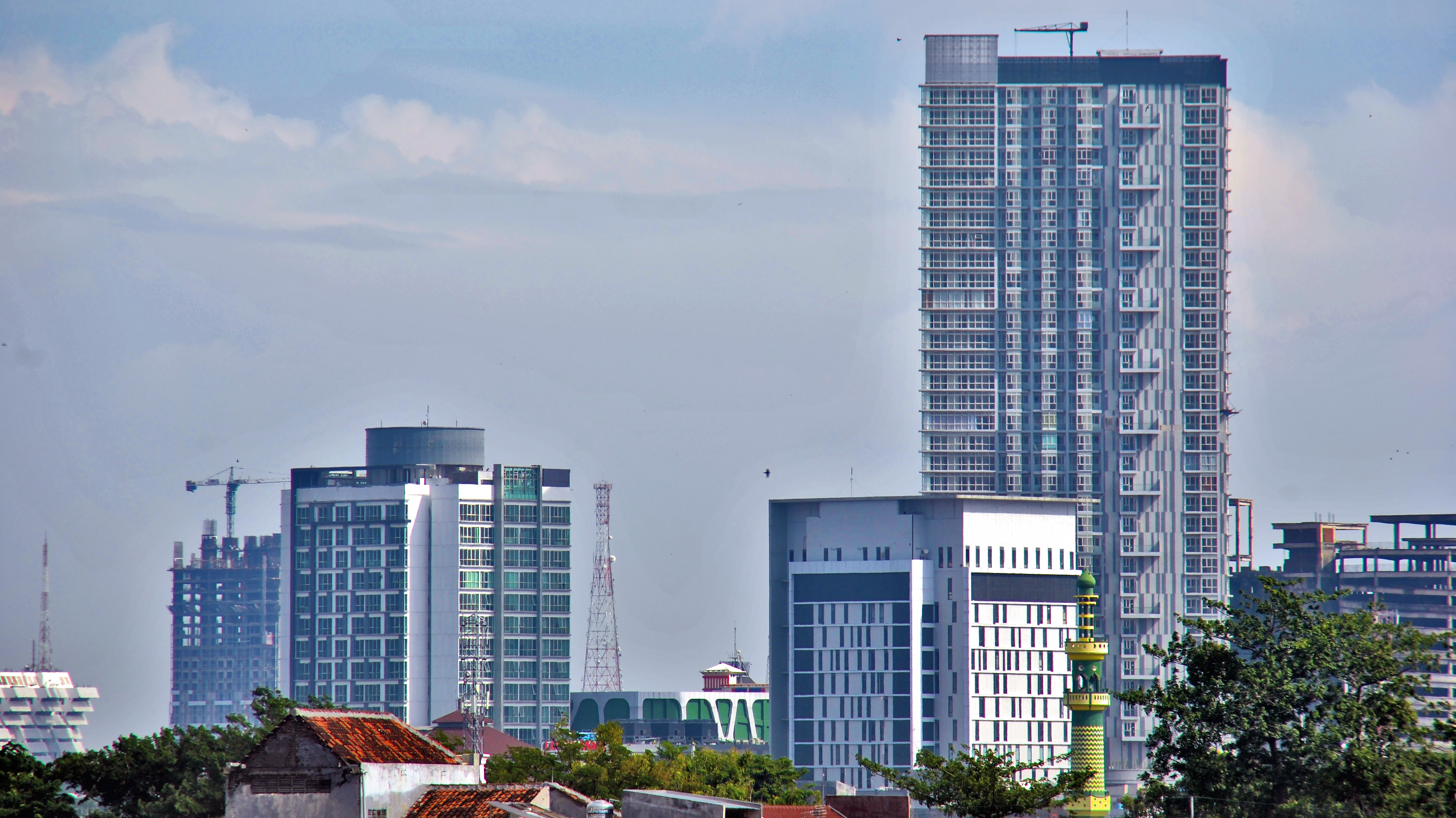
Skyscrapers in Surabaya

City	Country	National Olympic Committee	Result
Hanoi	Vietnam	Vietnam Olympic Committee	Winner
Vietnam officially launched the bid on June 7, 2011, having previously hosted major sporting events including the 2003 Southeast Asian Games, and the 2009 Asian Indoor Games, and was also selected to host 2016 Asian Beach Games. The city emerged as the favourite after the government pledged to spend $1 million on infrastructure development. The city of Hanoi proposed to have the 2019 Asian Games held in November, and the city estimated a budget between US$150 and 300 million for funding the Games. The athletes' village was planned to be located in Gia Lâm District, with a capacity of 11,000 people on 39 hectares (390,000 m^{2}).
Surabaya	Indonesia	Indonesian Olympic Committee	First runner-up
As claimed by committee, the nation was supported and offered by the Olympic Council of Asia to stage the Games. Surabaya is Indonesia's second-largest city after Jakarta with a population of over 2.7 million (5.6 million in the metropolitan area). Indonesia last hosted the Games back in 1962 in Jakarta. After the loss, Indonesian delegate members claimed the Hanoi's win was influenced by China's huge interest to the country. But as consolation, they were awarded the 2021 Asian Youth Games.

=== Cancelled bids ===
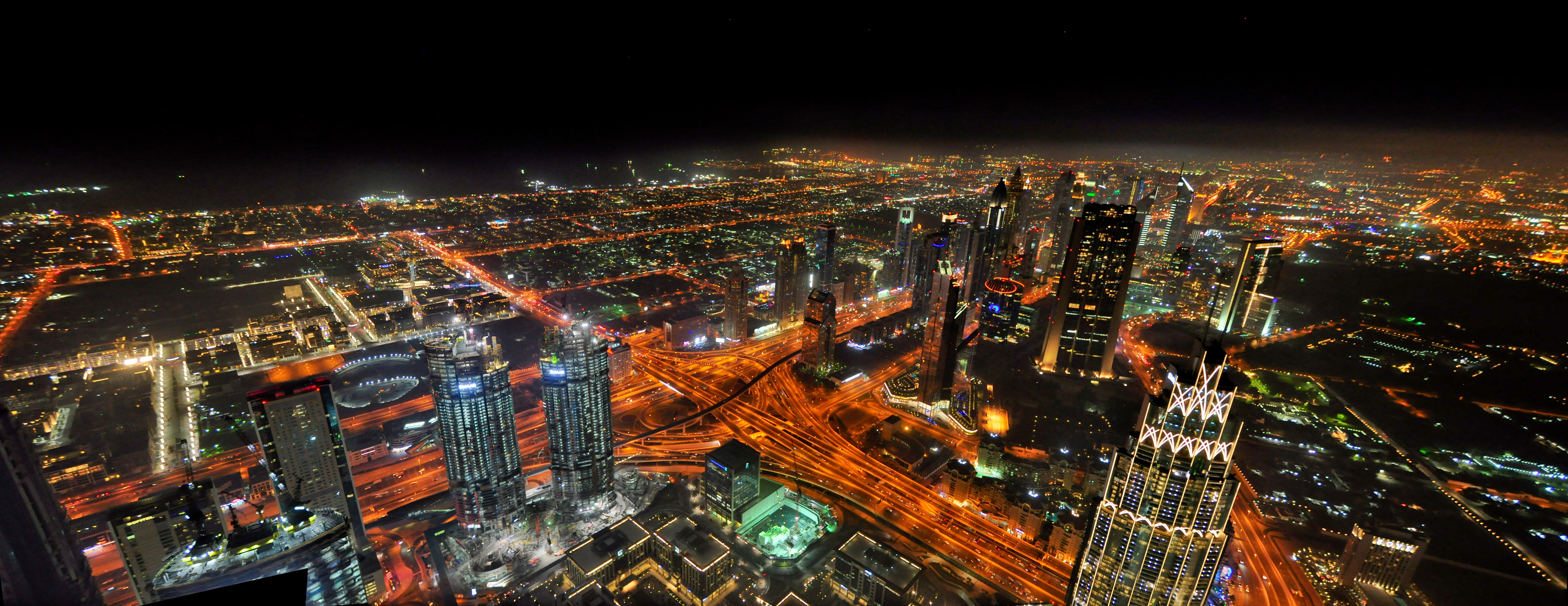
Skyscraper in Dubai

City	Country	National Olympic Committee	Result
Dubai	United Arab Emirates	United Arab Emirates National Olympic Committee	Withdrew
This was the second time Dubai had bid for the Games after 2014. However, Dubai pulled out at the last minute, citing that they want to focus on future bids. The committee first vice-president denied any pullout and claimed the NOC "did not apply for hosting 2019 Asian Games, and it only considered this"

=== Potential cities ===
- Hong Kong – On January 14, 2011, the Finance Committee of Legislative Council rejected the budget submitted by the government, cancelling the bid the Games.
- New Delhi, India – Interested, but turned down by the government on August 2, 2010 amid allegations of corruption in 2010 Commonwealth Games.
- Kuala Lumpur, Malaysia – Bid submitted in January 2010, but pulled out in September 2010 due to financial constraints.
- Taipei, Chinese Taipei – On August 18, 2010, Taipei Mayor Hau Lung-bin announced that Taipei will bid for the Games, but withdrew in March 2012.

=== Concerns and withdrawal ===
Previous Host City Spent
Year	City	Cost
2002	(South Korea) Busan	$2.9 billion
2006	(Qatar) Doha	$2.8 billion
2010	(China) Guangzhou	$20 billion
2014	(South Korea) Incheon	$1.6 billion
2018	(Indonesia) Jakarta - Palembang	$3.0 billion

In March 2014, lawmakers first raised concerns on whether US$150 million is a realistic budget for the Games, by referring to the amount spent by the previous host city, and claimed that the government may eventually spend over US$300 million. In addition, several stadiums built in conjunction with 2003 Southeast Asian Games were not utilised after the regional events. Former chairman of Vietnam Olympic Committee Ha Quang Du also added that hosting the Asian Games would not boost tourism in Vietnam.

However, on April 11, 2014, Vuong Bich Thang, head of the General Department of Sports and Physical Training, assured that 80% of the facilities are available and US$150 million is enough to host the Games. He added that no new athletes' village would be built, but instead hotels, dormitories, and residential quarters would be provided for participating athletes and officials. The World Bank confirmed that there would be no loans for Vietnam for the purpose of building Asiad facilities.

On April 17, 2014, Vietnam Prime Minister Nguyen Tan Dung officially announced Hanoi's withdrawal from hosting the games. He cited unpreparedness and economic recession as the main reasons of the withdrawal, as they have left the country unable to afford the construction of facilities and venues. Statistics imply that the majority of Vietnamese are happy with this decision.

The OCA has announced that is no penalty will be imposed for the withdrawal.

== Second selection ==
Following Hanoi's withdrawal from hosting of the Games due to the country's financial problems, the second round of bidding was announced on 19 April 2014.

=== Host city selection ===
On July 25, 2014, during the meeting in Kuwait City, the OCA has appointed Jakarta as host of the Games. Jakarta will be supported by Palembang as the supporting host. The Indonesian capital city was chosen because it has well-equipped sport facilities as well as adequate transportation networks, and other facilities such hotels and lodgings for guests. The Games, however, were said to be rescheduled a year earlier, shifted from originally planned 2019 to 2018, citing that in 2019, Indonesians will be preoccupied by their presidential election, and Jakarta would only need a relatively minimal time to upgrade and renovate their existing sports facilities. The last time Indonesia and Jakarta host the games was in 1962.

=== Potential cities ===
The OCA has said that Indonesia, China and the United Arab Emirates were candidates for the replacement of Hanoi. Several other countries were mentioned as potential replacements and some countries have been ruled out, as follows:

==== Interested ====
- Indonesia – Considered a favorite to host the Games, and willing to do so if selected. Accordingly, Indonesia has emerged as a strong contender for a potential replacement. However, Indonesian Olympic Committee (KOI) chairwoman Rita Subowo has questioned whether they have enough time for preparation, and the new government may not agree to the plans. However, Jakarta then began to refocus and change its image to prepare itself as best as possible for the 2018 Asian Games. In May 2014, a delegation from the Olympic Council of Asia, led by vice president Wei Jizhong, visited Jakarta, Bandung in West Java, and Palembang in South Sumatra to meet with Indonesian officials and to evaluate the potential of these cities as alternate host cities. According to the delegation, Jakarta meets all the Asian Games' technical requirements, while Palembang sports facilities were considered insufficient. Indonesia remains best-equipped for the task; according to Wei, no other competitors can offer better conditions than Indonesia for the time being. Bandung also has expressed their interest in hosting the games, and more recently West Java has modernized and built new sport facilities to host the 2016 Indonesian National Sports Week, an Indonesian inter-province sporting event. On July 15, a team from Indonesian Ministry for Youth and Sport Affairs held a meeting with South Sumatera's Governor, Alex Noerdin, to check whether Palembang was ready to host the Games or not. It is also stated that Jakarta will serve as co-host if needed. On Friday, 25 July 2014, during their meeting in Kuwait City, the Olympic Council of Asia has appointed Jakarta as the host of the next Asian Games. Jakarta would be supported by Palembang as the supporting host. The last time Indonesia and Jakarta host the games was in 1962 Asian Games.
- Philippines – The Philippine Olympic Committee announced on August 30, 2014 that it has officially submitted its bid to the OCA after their visit at the 2014 Youth Olympic Games. Both the POC and the Philippine Sports Commission considered hosting the games when the sports hub in Ciudad de Victoria in Bocaue, north of Manila was offered to be used for international events by the religious sect Iglesia ni Cristo after it was used in its centennial anniversary. It features the 55,000 seater Philippine Arena and 25,000 seater Philippine Sports Stadium, Philippine Sports Center (swimming and other indoor sporting events). He also proposed holding some sporting events in venues in nearby Manila and even in provinces like Laguna, Negros Occidental, as previously done in the hosting of the 2005 Southeast Asian Games. PSC Chairman Richie Garcia said that four or five years would be enough to prepare for the hosting of the games. Garcia said that hosting the games would be possible with full support from the government and the private sector. It will be 65 years since the Philippines previously hosted the games and 100 years since it hosted the 1919 Far Eastern Games.

==== Considering ====
- Chinese Taipei – Taipei's Sports Affairs Administration said they are interested in other international sports events and New Taipei City is bidding for the 2023 Games. Kaohsiung, meanwhile, claimed they would spend one month for evaluating the possibility of hosting 2019's games.
- Malaysia – Considering on the proviso that the OCA contributes funding, as the cost of hosting the games at short notice are considered too high. However, Youth and Sports Minister denied any plan to host and stated that their top priority is for the 2017 Southeast Asian Games. Tunku Muda Serting Imran has suggested that Malaysia could bid jointly with Singapore in order to manage the rising costs.

==== Cancelled ====
- India – Has expressed interest and is awaiting government approval. If India hosts the Games, the government will exercise the financial powers of the Indian Olympic Association (IOA). The IOA will only organise the multi-sporting event, a remark which appeared to stem from the experience of 2010 Commonwealth Games corruption scandal. New Delhi is considered as potential Indian host. On May 12, 2014, the IOA warned that without Indian government's support, they were running out of time to meet the July 1, 2014 deadline to submit bids to OCA for the Game, citing that it would be tough to get the government assurances in such a short time, although it is highly unlikely that the new government will decide on such a major issue in a hurry. India has previously hosted the Asian Games twice; first in Delhi in 1951 and then again in 1982. However, on July 7, 2014, India failed to submit late bid after failing to get an audience with Prime Minister Narendra Modi, having given an extended deadline by OCA.

==== No intention ====
- China – Mainly focused on the 2022 Winter Olympics in Beijing, China has no plan to take over the 2018 Asian Games. The Chinese Olympic Committee has not received any domestic bids nor been approached by the OCA about taking over the event. No Chinese cities have shown any intention to take over so far. Nevertheless, a Chinese source named Nanjing, host of the 2014 Summer Youth Olympics, as a potential city to take over should OCA seeks China's help. The last time China hosted the Asian Games was 2010 in Guangzhou. Eventually, it hosted the Asian Games once again in Hangzhou in 2022.
- Myanmar – Downplayed the chance due to lack of expertise and manpower in organisation.
- Japan – Not interested, as they are focusing on the 2020 Summer Olympics and also the 2019 Rugby World Cup.
- Singapore – Not interested, as they were focusing on 2015 Southeast Asian Games, as announced by Ng Ser Miang, vice-president of the Singapore National Olympic Council.
- Thailand – Not interested, stating that five years time is not enough to prepare adequately.
