= List of events at the Philippine Arena =

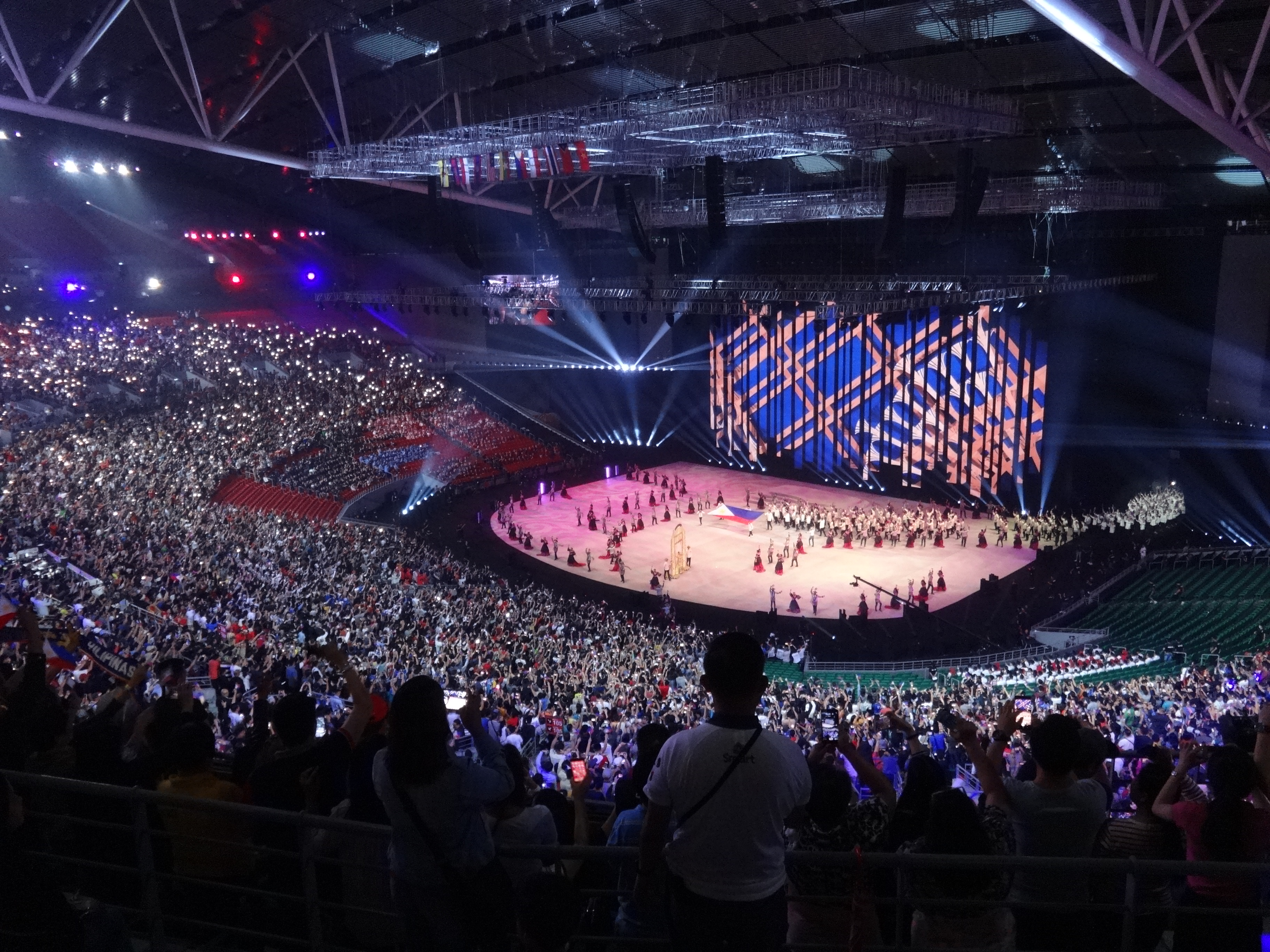
The Philippine Arena hosted the 2019 SEA Games opening ceremony

The Philippine Arena in Bocaue, Bulacan, Philippines, which is the world's largest indoor arena, is primarily used for large-scale concerts, sports events and religious gatherings with a seating capacity of 55,000. The arena is owned by the religious organization Iglesia ni Cristo (INC).

== INC Centennial events ==
The events that took place on the Philippine Arena are a series of activities by the Iglesia ni Cristo (INC) as part of their centennial celebration.

Date(s)	Event(s)	Description
July 27, 2014	Special Worship Service and Oratorio	A worship service led by INC Executive Minister Eduardo V. Manalo, along with a large musical composition for orchestra, choir, and soloists.
July 29, 2014	Ang Bayan Mo'y Nagpupuri (Your Nation Praises You)	A musical presentation featuring original INC Christian music and the history of the Iglesia ni Cristo.
July 31, 2014	Ang Sugo (The Messenger)	A stage play depicting the ministry of Felix Manalo and the history of the Iglesia ni Cristo.
August 1, 2014	Tagisan ng Talino (Battle of Wits)	A quiz show which includes Bible and INC history and current events for teens and children categories.
August 2, 2014	Evangelical Mission	A Bible exposition for the non-members.
October 31, 2014	INCinema Excellence in Visual Media Awards (EVM Awards)	Recognition of the top 20 film entries produced by members worldwide.
November 8, 2014	Kabayan Ko, Kapatid Ko (My Countrymen, My Brethren)	An outreach and evangelical mission which provide medical and dental services, groceries, entertainment shows, and bible studies.
November 23, 2014	Songs of Faith, Love and Hope: International Singing Competition	Solo singing competition featuring original INC Christian music participated by delegates from different parts of the world.
December 30, 2014	Kabayan Ko, Kapatid Ko: Year-End Concert	A pre-new-year concert featuring the accomplishments of the Felix Y. Manalo Foundation and the Iglesia ni Cristo as a whole.
February 20, 2015	Nueva Ecija Ecclesiastical District 85th Anniversary	The INC ecclesiastical districts of Nueva Ecija Central, East, North, South, and Aurora, which were formerly part of the once lone ecclesiastical district in the province, gathered for a worship service led by Manalo.
May 19, 2015	New Era University (NEU) 40th Commencement Exercises	Baccalaureate service led by Eduardo V. Manalo, NEU graduation from elementary to post-graduate studies across all campuses, and alumni homecoming.
July 25–26, 2015	International Unity Games	Members of the Iglesia ni Cristo from all over the globe gathered for the first-ever Unity Games International. Said sporting event marked the end of the centennial year.
July 26, 2015	Centennial Closing Ceremony	A worship service led by INC Executive Minister Eduardo V. Manalo, along with a large musical celebration of all INC members from all over the globe.

== Sporting events ==
Date(s)	Event(s)	Attendance	Notes
October 19, 2014	2014–15 PBA Philippine Cup opening ceremonies: 1st Game: Kia Sorento vs. Blackwater Elite; 2nd Game: Talk 'N Text Tropang Texters vs. Barangay Ginebra San Miguel	52,612	The first commercial and non-INC event held in the Philippine Arena, it was the largest attendance record for an opening ceremony in PBA history.
December 25, 2016	2016–17 PBA Philippine Cup Eliminations: 1st Game: Mahindra Floodbuster vs. Blackwater Elite; 2nd Game: Barangay Ginebra San Miguel vs. Star Hotshots	25,000	This was the second time that the PBA games was held in the Philippine Arena.
October 22, 2017	2017 PBA Governors' Cup Finals (Game 5): Barangay Ginebra San Miguel vs. Meralco Bolts	36,445	This was the first PBA Finals held in the arena.
October 25, 2017	2017 PBA Governors' Cup Finals (Game 6): Meralco Bolts vs. Barangay Ginebra San Miguel	53,642	
October 27, 2017	2017 PBA Governors' Cup Finals (Game 7): Barangay Ginebra San Miguel vs. Meralco Bolts	54,086	
December 25, 2017	2017–18 PBA Philippine Cup Eliminations: 1st Game: NLEX Road Warriors vs. GlobalPort Batang Pier; 2nd Game: Barangay Ginebra San Miguel vs. Magnolia Hotshots Pambansang Manok	22,531	
January 15–21, 2018	Galaxy Battles Dota 2 e-Sport Tournaments		
February 18, 2018	2017–18 PBA Philippine Cup Eliminations: 1st Game: NLEX Road Warriors vs. Blackwater Elite; 2nd Game: Meralco Bolts vs. Barangay Ginebra San Miguel		
June 8–12, 2018	2018 FIBA 3x3 World Cup		
July 2, 2018	2019 FIBA Basketball World Cup qualification: Philippines vs. Australia	22,181	See also: Philippines-Australia basketball brawl
January 13, 2019	2019 PBA Philippine Cup Opening Ceremonies: Barangay Ginebra San Miguel vs. TNT KaTropa	23,711	
November 30, 2019	2019 Southeast Asian Games opening ceremony		
January 15, 2023	2022–23 PBA Commissioner's Cup Finals (Game 7): Barangay Ginebra San Miguel vs. Bay Area Dragons	54,589	The largest attendance record for a PBA game and for a PBA Finals game
February 24 and 27, 2023	2023 FIBA Basketball World Cup qualification: Philippines vs. Lebanon; Philippines vs. Jordan		The first FIBA-sanctioned game since the Philippines-Australia basketball brawl
August 25, 2023	2023 FIBA Basketball World Cup opening ceremonies: Angola vs. Italy; Dominican Republic vs. Philippines	38,115	The largest attendance record for a FIBA Basketball World Cup game

== Entertainment events ==
Notable entertainment events in the Philippine Arena include numerous concerts.

Date(s)	Entertainer(s)	Event / Tour	Attendance	Revenue (US$)	Notes	Ref(s)
April 12, 2015	Super Junior, Girls' Generation, BtoB, Red Velvet	Best of Best in the Philippines	20,000	—	The four South Korean groups were the first artists to perform at the arena.	
May 7, 2015	Katy Perry	Prismatic World Tour	34,683	—	Katy Perry was the first solo performer to perform at the arena. The Dolls were the opening act.	
May 31, 2015	—N/a	Alliance In Motion Global 9th Anniversary	30,050	—	AIM Global broke the record with 30,050 verified participants wearing smiley face masks during their ninth anniversary celebration at the arena. A Guinness World Records representative announced the success of the record-breaking attempts during the company's anniversary held at the arena.	
October 4, 2015	—N/a	Felix Manalo film premiere	43,624	—	The biographical film about the life of the first Executive Minister of the Iglesia ni Cristo (the organization that owns the arena) holds the Guinness World Record for "Largest Attendance For A Film Screening" and "Largest Attendance For A Film Premiere".	
October 24, 2015	AlDub (Alden Richards and Maine Mendoza), EB Dabarkads (Eat Bulaga! hosts)	Eat Bulaga!: Sa Tamang Panahon	55,000	—	The Kalyeserye segment from the noontime variety show Eat Bulaga!, held at the arena, marked the first live television event at the arena.	
November 11, 2018	Guns N' Roses	Not in This Lifetime... Tour	24,638 / 30,220	2,235,518	Guns N' Roses were the first rock musicians to perform at the Philippine Arena.	
October 26, 2019	Imelda Papin	Imelda Papin: Queen@45	—	—	Imelda Papin's 45th anniversary concert made her the first Filipino artist to hold a solo concert at the arena. Andrew E., April Boy Regino, Claire dela Fuente, Darius Razon, Eva Eugenio, Jovit Baldivino, Marco Sison, Pilita Corrales, Sonny Parsons with Hagibis, and Victor Wood were special guests.	
December 11, 2019	U2	The Joshua Tree Tour 2019	33,721	6,895,277	U2's first performance in the Philippines.	
December 14, 2019	December Avenue, Ben&Ben, Arnel Pineda	Cloudstaff Roar Year-end Party	9,113	—	Philippine-Australian outsourcing provider Cloudstaff held the first-ever corporate concert at the arena, inviting employees and their families to the event that served as their corporate year-end party.	
November 17, 2022	Stell, Zephanie, Janella Salvador	Disney+ A Night of Wonder	—	—	A performance by local Filipino singers was recorded at the arena to celebrate the launch of American streaming service Disney+ in the Philippines.	
December 17, 2022	Seventeen	Be The Sun World Tour	39,480 / 39,480	5,088,704	Seventeen were the first South Korean group to stage a concert at the arena during the COVID-19 pandemic. It was the group's third performance in the country.	
March 14, 2023	Harry Styles	Love On Tour	29,247 / 29,247	3,337,289		
March 25–26, 2023	Blackpink	Born Pink World Tour	92,720 / 92,720	14,174,292	Blackpink were the first South Korean girl group to stage and sell out a multi-night event at the arena.	
June 24–25, 2023	Bruno Mars	Bruno Mars Live	76,252 / 76,252	10,377,192	Bruno Mars was the first solo performer to sell out two shows at the arena on a single tour.	
August 13, 2023	Tomorrow X Together	Act: Sweet Mirage	10,886 / 10,886	1,720,917		
August 25, 2023	Sarah Geronimo, Bernard Bernardo, Ben&Ben, The Dawn, Alamat	2023 FIBA Basketball World Cup opening ceremony	38,115	—		
September 30 – October 1, 2023	Twice	Ready to Be World Tour	86,930 / 86,930	11,294,323		
December 14, 2023	Various Asian personalities	8th Asia Artist Awards	—	—	The 2023 Asia Artist Awards were hosted by Kang Daniel, Jang Won-young, and Sung Han-bin and was broadcast live on Lazada in the Philippines, Hulu in Japan, and on Weverse elsewhere.	
January 19–20, 2024	Coldplay	Music of the Spheres World Tour	96,079 / 96,079	15,425,466	Coldplay were the first Western group to perform two sold-out shows at the arena on a single tour, thereby setting the first to hold the record for the highest attendance by a musical act at the arena. Jikamarie was the opening act on both dates, while Lola Amour and Dilaw were surprise guests on January 19 and 20 respectively.	
June 1, 2024	IU	IU HEREH World Tour	37,000	—	IU was the first South Korean solo performer to stage a concert at the arena.	
October 5, 2024	Olivia Rodrigo	Guts World Tour	48,829 / 48,829	1,222,691	A special "Silver Star" show, wherein all tickets were sold at ₱1,000 (US$20)	
October 12, 2024	LANY	a beautiful blur: the world tour	—	—	Culture Wars was a special guest.	
November 13, 2024	Dua Lipa	Radical Optimism Tour	24,986 / 24,986	2,434,968		
November 23, 2024	Stray Kids	Dominate World Tour	55,000	—		
February 15, 2025	Bini	Biniverse World Tour 2025	55,000	—	Bini were the first Filipino group to headline and sell out a solo concert at the arena. Maki was a guest performer.	
May 17, 2025	G-Dragon	Übermensch World Tour	—	—		
May 31 – June 1, 2025	SB19	Simula at Wakas World Tour	55,000	—	SB19 were the first Filipino act to sell out a concert at the arena in less than seven hours. They were also the first Filipino act to hold and sell out two consecutive shows at the arena.	
July 5, 2025	Bini, SB19, G22, Kaia, Flow G, SunKissed Lola, Skusta Clee	Puregold OPM Con 2025	30,000	—	The event, organized by Puregold, features an all-OPM lineup, celebrating contemporary Filipino music with headliners across pop, hip-hop, and indie rock. It marked one of the largest OPM-centric concerts at the arena to date.	
October 4, 2025	Twice	This Is For World Tour	—	—	Jeongyeon was absent due to health issues.	
November 22–23, 2025	Blackpink	Deadline World Tour	—	—		
November 29, 2025	Bini	Binified: A Year-End Party	—	—		
June 27, 2026	F4	F Forever City of Stars Tour	—	—		
November 7–8, 2026	LANY	Soft by LANY: The World Tour	—	—		
November 14, 2026	My Chemical Romance	The Black Parade 2026	—	—	The show was initially scheduled for April 25, 2026, but was postponed to November 14, 2026, for undisclosed reasons.	
January 14, 2027	Olivia Dean, Bini, UDD, Lola Amour, SunKissed Lola	LaLaLa Fest Manila 2027	—	—		
May 15–16 and 18, 2027	Bruno Mars	The Romantic Tour	—	—	Anderson .Paak (as DJ Pee .Wee) will serve as a special guest for all dates.	
TBA	Post Malone	Big Ass Stadium Tour Part 2	—	—	Don Toliver will serve as the opening act. The show was initially scheduled for September 29, 2026, but was postponed to an unannounced later date for unknown reasons.	

== Political events ==
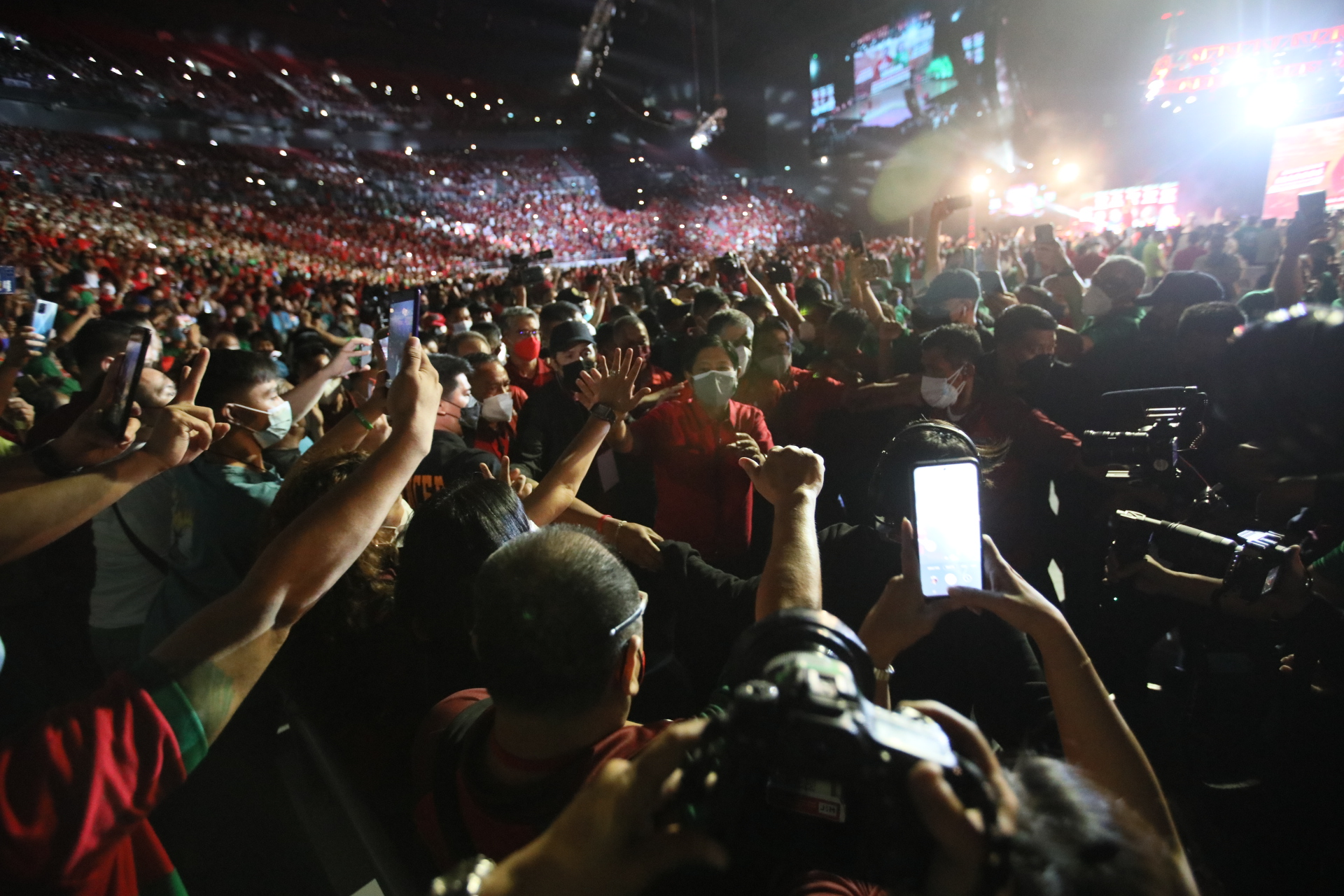
Bongbong Marcos at the Philippine Arena during his proclamation rally

Ahead of the 2022 Philippine elections, the UniTeam alliance of presidential candidate Bongbong Marcos and vice-presidential candidate Sara Duterte held their proclamation rally at the Philippine Arena on February 8, 2022. The event was hosted by Toni Gonzaga. The arena operated at half of its capacity at that time due to the COVID-19 pandemic.

Rodante Marcoleta, a candidate in the 2025 senatorial election and a member of the INC, held his miting de avance (final rally) at the Philippine Arena on May 6, 2025. An estimated 55,000 to 60,000 people attended Marcoleta's event.

== Yearly events ==
Date(s)	Event(s)	Organizers	Attendance
May 20–21, 2017 – April 14–15, 2018 – May 4–5, 2019 – May 13, 2023(Present)	Summer Blast x CFO Day	Iglesia ni Cristo, Maligaya Development Corporation, Net 25	120,000 (May 13, 2023)
December 29–31 (2015–2020) – December 30–31 (2022–present)	New Year Countdown	Iglesia ni Cristo, Maligaya Development Corporation, Net 25	

== See also ==
- List of entertainment events at the SM Mall of Asia complex
