= Philippine Sports Center =

Sports center in Bulacan, Philippines

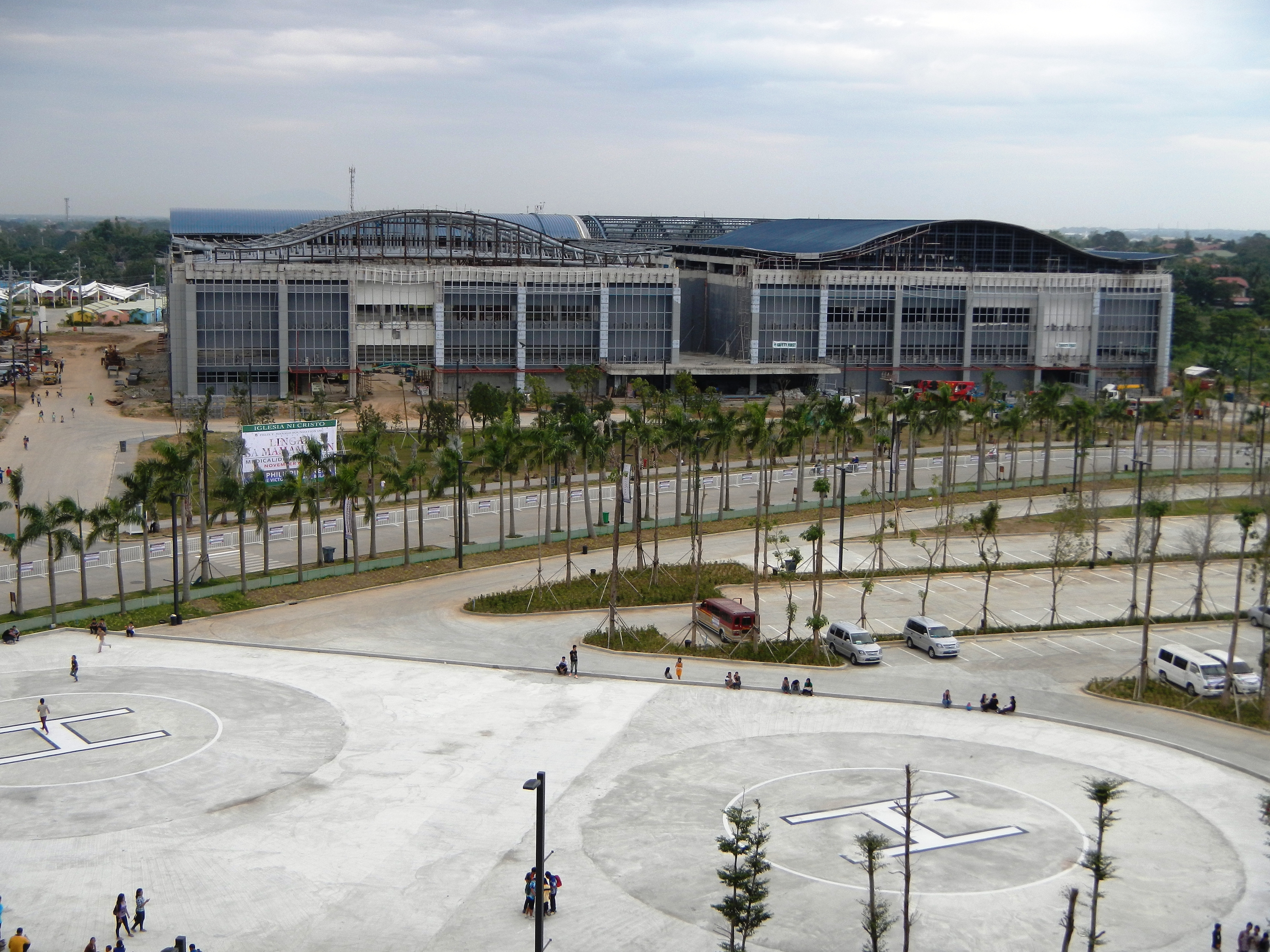
- The Philippine Sports Center under construction, November 2014
- Interactive map of Philippine Sports Center
- Location: Bocaue, Philippines
- Coordinates: 14°47′50″N 120°57′09″E
- Owner: Iglesia ni Cristo
- Operator: Maligaya Development Corporation
- Surface: 2 hectares (4.9 acres)

Construction
- Project managers: Iglesia ni Cristo; New San Jose Builders; Generation Design Asia
- Structural engineer: Phildipphil
- Main contractor: Phildipphil

The Philippine Sports Center is a sporting venue under-construction inside the Ciudad de Victoria development which spans over Bocaue and Santa Maria, Bulacan, Philippines. The sporting center will host an Olympic-size swimming pool and a multi-purpose gymnasium. Like the nearby Philippine Arena and the Philippine Sports Stadium, the Iglesia ni Cristo owned facility will be opened to the public.
