= 2023 FIBA Basketball World Cup Group A =

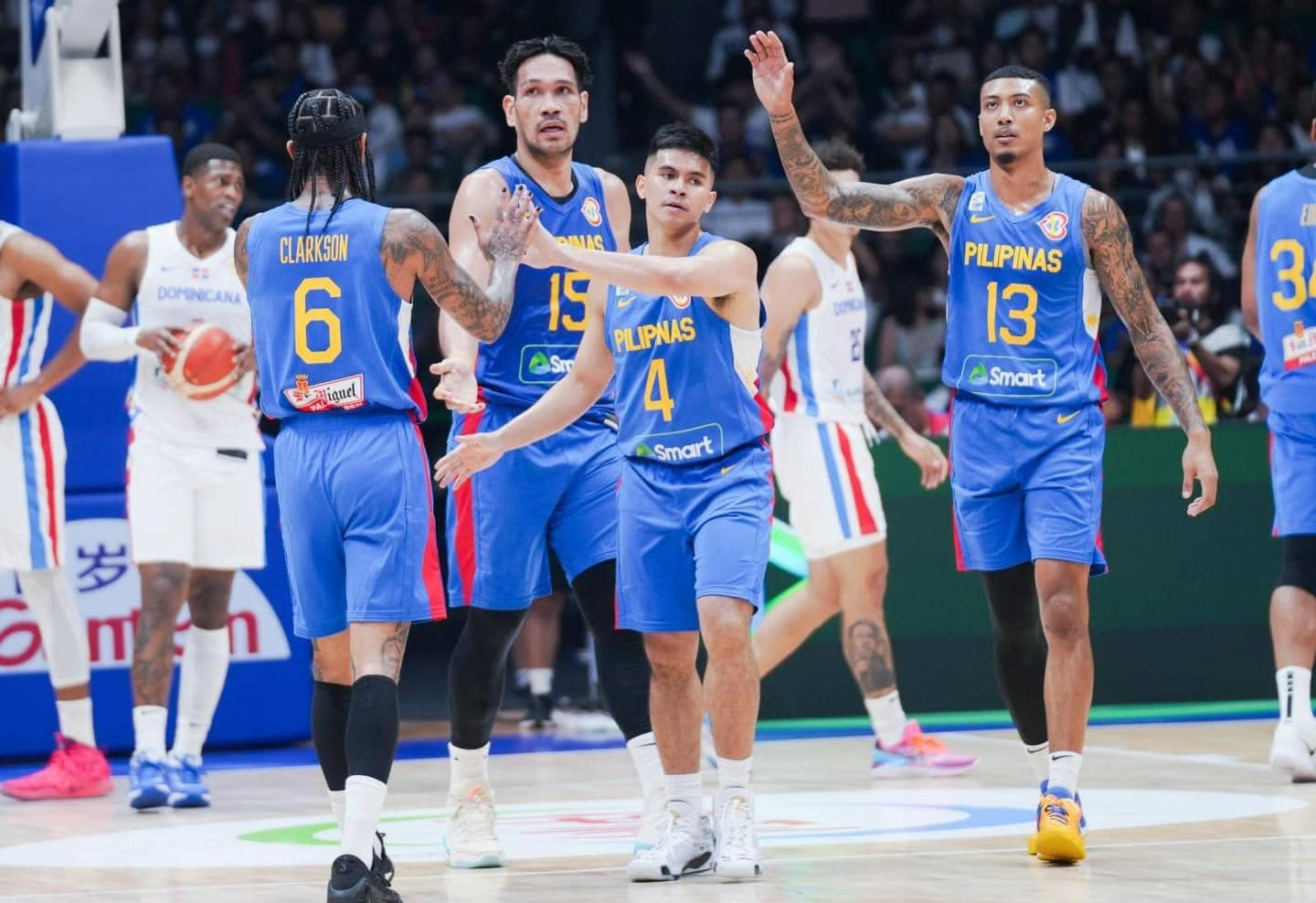
Dominican Republic v Philippines

Group A was one of eight groups of the preliminary round of the 2023 FIBA Basketball World Cup. It took place from 25 to 29 August 2023, and consisted of Angola, the Dominican Republic, Italy, and the Philippines. Each team played each other once, for a total of three games per team, with all but two games to be played at the Araneta Coliseum, Quezon City, Philippines. The top two teams advanced to the second round and the bottom two teams qualified for the classification rounds.

Following the venue change for the final phase to the Mall of Asia Arena in Pasay, FIBA announced that the first two games of Group A would take place at the Philippine Arena in Bocaue, the original venue for the final phase.

== Teams ==
Team	Qualification		Appearance			Best performance	WR
Team	As	Date	Last	Total	Streak	Best performance	WR
Angola	African Group E top two	25 February 2023	2019	9	6	9th place (2006)	41
Philippines	Host nation	9 December 2017	2019	7	3	3rd place (1954)	40
Dominican Republic	Americas Group E top three	26 February 2023	2019	4	3	12th place (1978)	23
Italy	European Group L top three	14 November 2022	2019	10	2	4th place (1970, 1978)	10

== Standings ==
Pos	Team	Pld	W	L	PF	PA	PD	Pts	Qualification
1	Dominican Republic	3	3	0	249	230	+19	6	Second round
2	Italy	3	2	1	253	237	+16	5	Second round
3	Angola	3	1	2	214	226	−12	4	17th–32nd classification
4	Philippines (H)	3	0	3	234	257	−23	3	17th–32nd classification

Source: FIBA
Rules for classification: Tiebreakers
(H) Hosts

== Games ==
All times are local (UTC+8).

=== Angola vs. Italy ===
This was the third game between Angola and Italy in the World Cup and their second consecutive matchup. The Italians won the first two meetings in 1990 and 2019.

25 August 2023
16:00

Boxscore

Angola	67–81	Italy
Scoring by quarter: 17–23, 23–20, 17–18, 10–20
Pts: Dundão 19; Rebs: five players 5 Asts: Gonçalves 4		Pts: Fontecchio 19; Rebs: Polonara 7 Asts: Spissu 7

Philippine Arena, Bocaue
Attendance: 21,214
Referees: Guilherme Locatelli (BRA), Kerem Baki (TUR), Martin Vulić (CRO)

=== Dominican Republic vs. Philippines ===
This was the first game between the Dominican Republic and the Philippines in the World Cup. The Dominicans won in the 2020 FIBA Men's Olympic Qualifying Tournament in Belgrade, which was the last competitive game between the two teams.

The match broke the record for the most attended FIBA World Cup match with 38,115 coming to the venue. This surpassed the 1994 FIBA World Championship final in Toronto between the United States and Russia which was witnessed by an audience of 32,616 people.

25 August 2023
20:00

Boxscore

Dominican Republic	87–81	Philippines
Scoring by quarter: 22–18, 20–24, 24–22, 21–17
Pts: Towns 26; Rebs: Towns 10; Asts: Feliz 8		Pts: Clarkson 28; Rebs: Clarkson, Fajardo 7 Asts: Clarkson 7

Philippine Arena, Bocaue
Attendance: 38,115
Referees: Yohan Rosso (FRA), Leandro Zalazar (ARG), Gatis Saliņš (LAT)

=== Italy vs. Dominican Republic ===
This was the first game between Italy and the Dominican Republic in the World Cup. The Italians won in the semi-finals of the 2020 FIBA Men's Olympic Qualifying Tournament in Belgrade, which was the last competitive game between the two teams.

27 August 2023
16:00

Boxscore

Italy	82–87	Dominican Republic
Scoring by quarter: 19–13, 20–25, 17–31, 26–18
Pts: Spissu 17; Rebs: Melli 7 Asts: Spissu 4		Pts: Feliz, Towns 24; Rebs: Towns 11; Asts: Montero 9

Araneta Coliseum, Quezon City
Attendance: 6,298
Referees: Gatis Saliņš (LAT), Luis Castillo (ESP), Georgios Poursanidis (GRE)

=== Philippines vs. Angola ===
This was the second game between the Philippines and Angola in the World Cup. The Angolans won the first meeting in 2019, which was the last competitive game between the two teams.

27 August 2023
20:00

Boxscore

Philippines	70–80	Angola
Scoring by quarter: 19–12, 14–24, 19–20, 18–24
Pts: Clarkson 21; Rebs: Fajardo 7 Asts: Clarkson 7		Pts: Gonçalves 17; Rebs: Bango, Fernando 7 Asts: Domingos 7

Araneta Coliseum, Quezon City
Attendance: 12,784
Referees: Guilherme Locatelli (BRA), Mārtiņš Kozlovskis (LAT), Martin Vulić (CRO)

=== Angola vs. Dominican Republic ===
This was the first competitive game between Angola and the Dominican Republic.

29 August 2023
16:00

Boxscore

Angola	67–75	Dominican Republic
Scoring by quarter: 11–20, 21–17, 18–12, 17–26
Pts: De Sousa 19; Rebs: De Sousa 9 Asts: Dundão 7		Pts: Feliz 17; Rebs: Liz 8 Asts: Solano 4

Araneta Coliseum, Quezon City
Attendance: 4,769
Referees: Guilherme Locatelli (BRA), Luis Castillo (ESP), Martin Vulić (CRO)

=== Philippines vs. Italy ===
This was the third game between the Philippines and Italy in the World Cup and their second consecutive matchup. The Italians won the first two meetings in 1978 and 2019.

29 August 2023
20:00

Boxscore

Philippines	83–90	Italy
Scoring by quarter: 23–20, 16–28, 21–25, 23–17
Pts: Clarkson 23; Rebs: Edu 8 Asts: Clarkson 6		Pts: Fontecchio 18; Rebs: three players 6 Asts: Spissu 9

Araneta Coliseum, Quezon City
Attendance: 11,821
Referees: Yohan Rosso (FRA), Leandro Zalazar (ARG), Mārtiņš Kozlovskis (LAT)

== Statistical leaders ==
=== Player tournament average ===
Points

#	Player	Pld	Pts	PPG
1	(Philippines) Jordan Clarkson	3	72	24.0
2	(Dominican Republic) Karl-Anthony Towns	3	58	19.3
3	(Dominican Republic) Andrés Feliz	3	53	17.7
4	(Italy) Simone Fontecchio	3	50	16.7
5	(Angola) Bruno Fernando	3	40	13.3

Rebounds

#	Player	Pld	Rebs	RPG
1	(Dominican Republic) Karl-Anthony Towns	3	23	24.0
2	(Angola) Silvio De Sousa	3	19	6.3
2	(Philippines) A. J. Edu	3	19	6.3
2	(Italy) Nicolò Melli	3	19	6.3
5	(Philippines) June Mar Fajardo	3	18	6.0

Assists

#	Player	Pld	Asts	APG
1	(Philippines) Jordan Clarkson	3	20	6.7
1	(Italy) Marco Spissu	3	20	6.7
3	(Dominican Republic) Andrés Feliz	3	15	5.0
3	(Dominican Republic) Jean Montero	3	15	5.0
5	(Angola) Gerson Domingos	3	14	4.7
5	(Angola) Childe Dundão	3	14	4.7

Blocks

#	Player	Pld	Blks	BPG
1	(Italy) Nicolò Melli	3	5	1.7
2	(Philippines) A. J. Edu	3	4	1.3
2	(Angola) Bruno Fernando	3	4	1.3
4	(Angola) Gerson Gonçalves	3	3	1.0
4	(Dominican Republic) Jean Montero	3	3	1.0

Steals

#	Player	Pld	Stls	SPG
1	(Dominican Republic) Víctor Liz	3	9	3.0
2	(Angola) Childe Dundão	3	6	2.0
3	(Angola) Bruno Fernando	3	5	1.7
3	(Angola) Gerson Gonçalves	3	5	1.7
3	(Dominican Republic) Jean Montero	3	5	1.7

Minutes

#	Player	Pld	Mins	MPG
1	(Philippines) Jordan Clarkson	3	112	37.6
2	(Philippines) Dwight Ramos	3	89	29.9
3	(Philippines) A. J. Edu	3	89	29.7
4	(Dominican Republic) Andrés Feliz	3	88	29.6
5	(Italy) Simone Fontecchio	3	88	29.3

Free throws

#	Player	FTM	FTA	FT%
1	(Italy) Achille Polonara	3	13/14	92.9
2	(Philippines) Jordan Clarkson	3	21/23	91.3
3	(Dominican Republic) Karl-Anthony Towns	3	24/27	88.9
4	(Italy) Simone Fontecchio	3	11/13	84.6
5	(Dominican Republic) Víctor Liz	3	7/9	77.8

Field goal shooting

#	Player	FGM	FGA	FG%
1	(Dominican Republic) Andrés Feliz	19	30	63.3
2	(Angola) Bruno Fernando	15	31	48.4
3	(Dominican Republic) Víctor Liz	14	29	48.3
4	(Dominican Republic) Karl-Anthony Towns	14	35	40.0
5	(Philippines) Dwight Ramos	11	28	39.3

Efficiency

#	Player	Pld	MPG	PPG	Eff	EffPG
1	(Dominican Republic) Víctor Liz	3	29.6	17.7	71.0	23.7
2	(Dominican Republic) Karl-Anthony Towns	3	27.2	19.3	56.0	18.7
3	(Philippines) Jordan Clarkson	3	36.8	24.0	55.0	18.3
4	(Italy) Marco Spissu	3	27.4	11.7	50.0	16.7
5	(Italy) Nicolò Melli	3	27.3	7.7	48.0	16.0
