= 2021 Asian Youth Games =

Cancelled multi-sport event

III Asian Youth Games
- Host city: Shantou, China
- Motto: Surging Waves, Dynamic Youth (Chinese: 潮·起汕头，韵·动亚洲; pinyin: Cháo·qǐ shàntóu, yùn·dòng yàzhōu)
- Nations: 45
- Events: 18 sports
- Opening: 23 January 2024
- Closing: 7 February 2024
- Website: 2021shantou.cn

The 2024 Asian Youth Games or AYG 2024 (Chinese: 2024年亚洲青年运动会; pinyin: Èr Líng èr yī Nián Yàzhōu Qīngnián Yùndònghuì), officially the 3rd Asian Youth Games (Chinese: 第三届亚洲青年运动会; pinyin: Dìsān Jiè Yàzhōu Qīngnián Yùndònghuì) and commonly as Shantou 2021 (Chinese: 汕头2024; pinyin: Shàntóu Èr Líng èr yī), is a cancelled multi-sport event which was intended to be held in Shantou, Guangdong, China in 2024.

Originally planned as the fourth Games, the Olympic Council of Asia then decided to postpone the third Asian Youth Games from 2017 to 2021. Due to the ongoing COVID-19 pandemic, in September 2021, the Games were postponed to December 2022, similar to 2021 Southeast Asian Games as a result of the 2020 Summer Olympics in Tokyo postponement to 2021.

The Games were officially cancelled on 6 May 2022 due to the COVID-19 pandemic.

== History ==
On 8 November 2012, the Olympic Council of Asia awarded the 2021 Asian Youth Games hosting rights to Surabaya, Indonesia. Surabaya was an unsuccessful bidder for the then-2018 Asian Games when they were defeated by Hanoi, Vietnam. After Jakarta and Palembang was awarded the 2018 Asian Games in the second host selection due to Hanoi withdrawal, the right of 2021 Asian Youth Games awarded to Surabaya was rejected.

The 2017 Asian Youth Games (AYG) were to be an international multi-sport event. Initially planned to be hosted by the city of Hambantota, Sri Lanka. A new host for the 2017 AYG, however, was to be decided at a future Olympic Council of Asia general assembly after Sri Lanka lost its hosting rights. Sri Lanka had been stripped of its hosting rights by the OCA due to political interference of its national Olympic committee by the government. Sri Lanka's replacement was set to be decided at an OCA general assembly scheduled in September 2015. Indonesia was initially offered by the OCA to take over as hosts and the games were suggested as a test event for the 2018 Asian Games, but it was decided to postpone the event until 2021 as no replacement host city was found.

On 3 March 2019, the Olympic Council of Asia awarded the hosting rights to Shantou during the 38th OCA General Assembly in Bangkok, Thailand, after Shantou was the only city to declare the candidacy.

== Sports ==
The following 18 sports would have been part of these Games:

- Athletics
- Aquatics
  - Diving
  - Swimming
  - Water polo
- 3x3 basketball
- Badminton

- Beach volleyball
- Dragon boat racing
- Football
- Golf
- Gymnastics
- Handball
- Breakdancing

- Sport climbing
- Rugby sevens
- Surfing
- Table tennis
- Taekwondo
- Windsurfing
- Wushu

== See also ==
- 2010 Asian Games held in Guangzhou, Guangdong
- 2021 Asian Beach Games held in Sanya, Hainan
- 2021 Asian Youth Para Games held in Manama, Bahrain
- 2022 Asian Games held in Hangzhou, Zhejiang
