= Jikamarie =

Filipino singer and songwriter

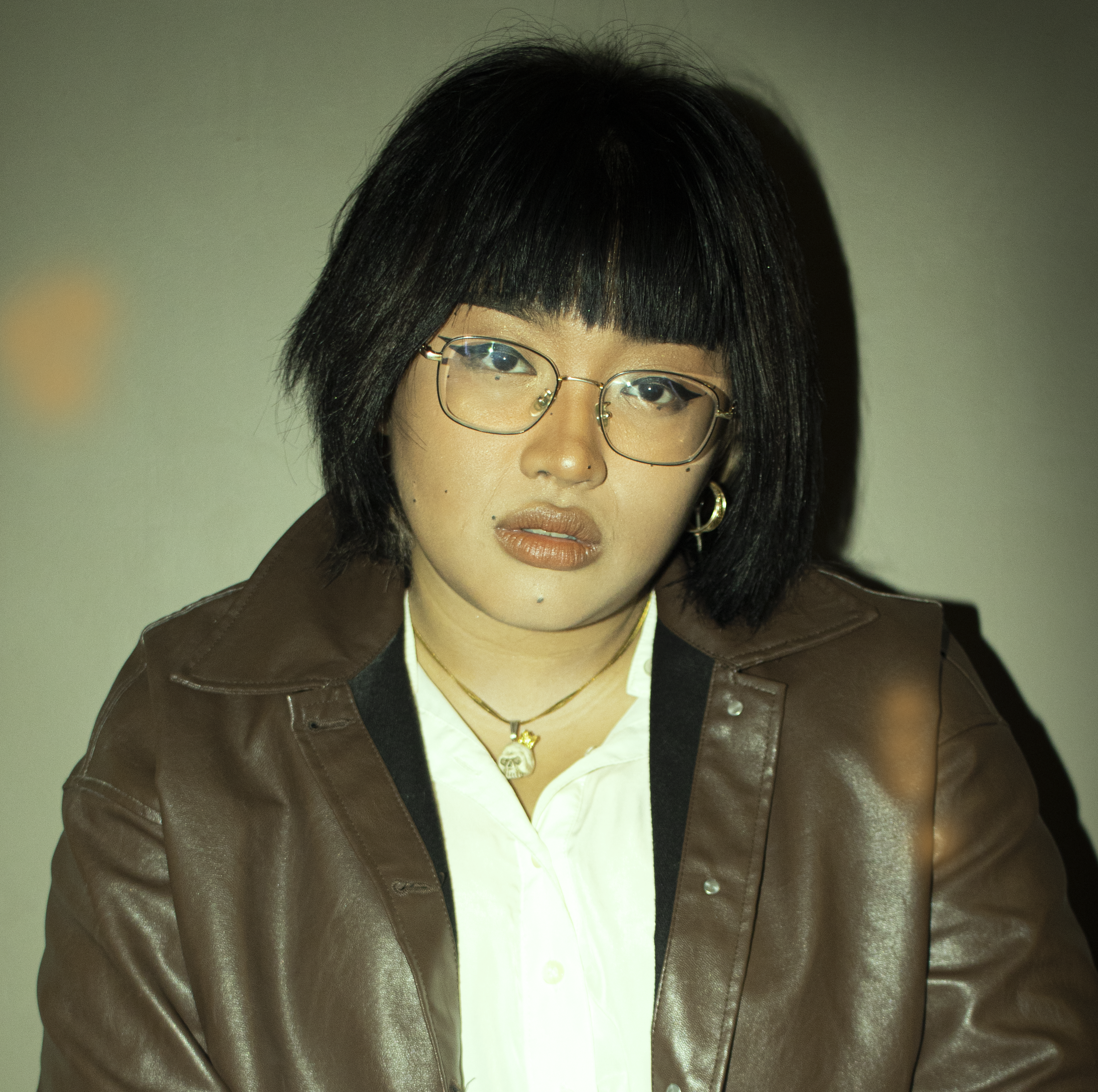

Background information
- Born: Angelika Lois Ponce
- Origin: Quezon City, Philippines
- Genres: Pop; R&B; dream pop
- Occupations: Singer; songwriter; visual artist
- Instruments: Vocals; guitar; ukulele
- Years active: 2021–present
- Label: Warner Music Philippines

Angelika Lois Ponce, known professionally as Jikamarie, is a Filipino singer and songwriter. She gained prominence in 2021 with her debut single, "Lutang", which charted on Spotify in the Philippines. She is signed to Warner Music Philippines. In 2024, she was the opening act for Coldplay's concerts at the Philippine Arena.

== Early life and education ==
Ponce was raised in a religious family in Quezon City. Her parents work as pastors and were previously members of a rock band during their college years. Her father is a musical director in their church. She has an older brother, Kenneth Ponce, who is an architect and music producer.

Ponce studied architecture in college while beginning her music career, although her parents initially encouraged her to focus on her degree over music. Aside from music, she is a visual artist and creates the artwork for her own promotional posters and visual identity.

== Career ==
=== 2021–2023: Beginnings and "Lutang" ===
Ponce began creating content on TikTok in 2020, where she posted anecdotes and song covers. She utilizes the platform to compose songs during livestreams, soliciting lyric suggestions from her audience. In August 2021, she posted a demo of her original song "Lutang" on the platform. Following viewer requests, she officially released the single later that year. The track was produced by her brother, Kenneth Ponce. The song's music video depicts themes of escapism and the tension between creative pursuits and academic pressure.

"Lutang" reached the number one position on the Spotify Viral 50 Philippines chart. After the single accumulated 100,000 streams, she was scouted by Kelley Mangahas, an A&R manager for Warner Music Philippines. She subsequently signed a recording contract with the label in October 2021.

Following her debut success, she performed at the first TikTok Philippines Awards. She released "Lutang: The Mixtape" in December 2021, which featured remixes of her debut single. In February 2022, she released her second single, "Kailangan ko ng...". She performed "Lutang" on the Wish 107.5 Bus in March 2022. That same month, she was featured on the track "Eh Papaano" by the artist JRLDM. In April 2022, she released the single "Aking Buwan".

=== 2024–present: L0VER G!RL and concerts ===
On January 12, 2024, Jikamarie released her debut EP titled L0VER G!RL. The EP contains tracks such as "HINAHANAP-HANAP", "lito", and "The Sun Is You".

She was selected as the opening act for the British band Coldplay during the Philippine leg of their Music of the Spheres World Tour. She performed at the Philippine Arena on January 19 and 20, 2024. Her setlist for the concert included seven original songs. Later in 2024, she performed on Rappler Live Jam and Billboard Philippines Soundwave.

In May 2024, she collaborated with the band Sugarcane on a new version of their song "Maria Clara", titled "Aking Maria Clara". In August 2024, Jikamarie was named a brand ambassador for Crocs alongside artists Lola Amour and Maki.

Jikamarie collaborated with Skusta Clee on the single "Para Pilitin Ka", which was released in March 2025. In October 2025, she reunited with Skusta Clee for their second collaboration, "Bumalik Ka Na Sa’kin", which features an acoustic arrangement. In November 2025, she collaborated with the P-pop group 1st.One on the single "Gusto Mo Ba".

== Artistry ==
Ponce's musical style has been described as a mix of R&B and dream pop. She cites Coldplay, BTS, The 1975, and SZA as musical influences.

== Discography ==
=== Extended plays ===
- L0VER G!RL (2024)

=== Singles ===
- "Lutang" (2021)
- "Kailangan ko ng..." (2022)
- "Aking Buwan" (2022)
- "Eh Papaano" (with JRLDM) (2022)
- "Hinahanap-hanap" (2023)
- "Balang Araw" (2023)
- "Bulong" (2023)
- "Lito" (2024)
- "The Sun Is You" (2024)
- "Aking Maria Clara" (with Sugarcane) (2024)
- "Pangalan" (2024)
- "Para Pilitin Ka" (with Skusta Clee) (2025)
- "Bumalik Ka Na Sa’kin" (with Skusta Clee) (2025)
- "Gusto Mo Ba" (with 1st.One) (2025)
