= Iglesia ni Cristo Centennial =

2014–2015 Christian event in the Philippines

- Native name: Sentenaryo ng Iglesia ni Cristo
- Date: July 27, 2014 – July 26, 2015
- Location: Primarily in the Philippines (some events held outside the country)
- Motive: To commemorate the registration of the church as Iglesia ni Kristo (INK) with the Philippine government on July 13, 1914; 112 years ago
- Organized by: Iglesia ni Cristo

The Iglesia ni Cristo Centennial (Filipino: Sentenaryo ng Iglesia ni Cristo) was an event dedicated to the 100th anniversary of the founding of the Iglesia ni Cristo, a new religious movement originating in the Philippines.

== Organization ==
The Iglesia ni Cristo Centennial officially began on July 27, 2014 and lasted until July 26, 2015. The start date marked the 100th anniversary the Iglesia ni Cristo was formally established in the Philippines by Felix Y. Manalo and registered with the Philippine government on July 13, 1914.

The Philippine government also played a part in the Centennial. President Benigno Aquino III's Proclamation No. 815 on July 2, 2014 declared the whole year of 2014 as "Iglesia ni Cristo Centennial Year". Aquino's government formed Task Force Senternaryo in anticipation of "large large number of Filipinos from here and abroad" that would participate in the commemorations, consisting of officials from various regular government agencies. The task force was led by Metropolitan Manila Development Authority (MMDA) chairman Francis Tolentino.

== Marketing ==
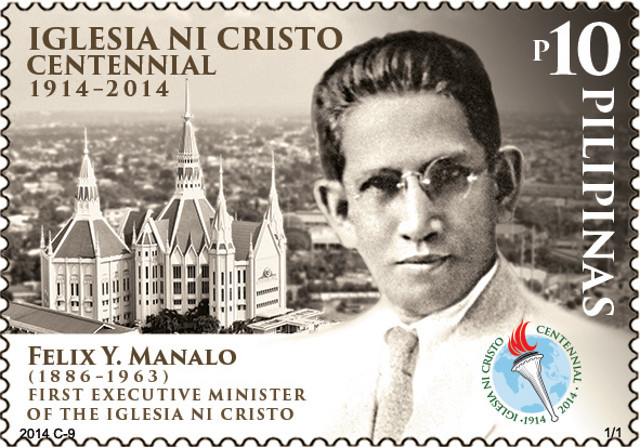
INC Centennial commemorative stamp.

The state-run Philippine Postal Corporation (PhilPost) released a postal stamp design commemorating the Iglesia ni Cristo Centennial. The stamp featured the denomination's founder Felix Manalo, the Centennial logo, and the INC Central Temple. Printed in monochrome, except for the logo, the stamp measured 50 by 35 millimeters (2.0 in × 1.4 in) which is larger than the standard 40 by 30 millimeters (1.6 in × 1.2 in) stamp size. The design was by INC member Bienvenido Santiago Jr. while the layout was made by Vic Serevo.

== Events ==
=== Ciudad de Victoria inauguration ===
The Philippine Arena.

On August 17, 2011, the Iglesia Ni Cristo executive minister Eduardo Manalo led the groundbreaking of the Ciudad de Victoria in Bocaue and Santa Maria, Bulacan. According to the INC, Eduardo's father and predecessor Eraño Manalo had long plans for a large complex where events similar in scale to the Centennial could be held. After three years of construction, the younger Manalo and Philippine president Benigno Aquino III led the inauguration of the Ciudad de Victoria on July 21, 2014 in time for the INC centennial celebration on July 27, 2014. The Philippine Arena, the largest indoor arena with a seating capacity of 55,000 was also opened.

=== July 27, 2014: Centennial day ===
The main event of the Iglesia ni Cristo Centennial took place at the Ciudad de Victoria in Bulacan. Around 2 million people attended the event live at the Ciudad de Victoria. INC Executive Minister Eduardo Manalo led the worship service held at the then-newly inaugurated Philippine Arena which was filled to its seating capacity. Other attendees were able to view the service through a LED screen outside the indoor arena.

The "Iglesia ni Cristo sa mga Huling Araw (Church of Christ in these Last Days)", an original musical presentation or oratorio, followed the worship service. The event was also streamed live in the INC's 1,100 houses of worship worldwide. The presentation covered the history of the church from its foundation in 1914 until the assumption of Eraño Manalo as Executive Minister of the church.

The event caused heavy traffic at the nearby North Luzon Expressway (NLEX). All of its four northbound lanes, were "totally blocked" which led to government authorities to allocate two southbound lanes to vehicles passing through the road heading north. The MMDA imposed a truck ban for vehicles not carrying perishable goods in NLEX and other major thoroughfares in Bulacan and Metro Manila from July 26 to 28, to alleviate the anticipated heavy traffic situation in the area.

=== Release of the Felix Manalo film ===
The Iglesia ni Cristo had a film about its founder, Felix Manalo produced. The film originally titled Ang Sugo was meant to be released during the July 27, 2014 celebrations but the production of the film encountered various issues.

The film was eventually released as Felix Manalo. The film was directed by Joel Lamangan with 90 named actors forming its cast. Dennis Trillo starred in the film portraying Felix Manalo. It premiered at the Philippine Arena on October 4, 2015 and was watched by 43,624 guests. Guinness World Records recognized two records; for the "largest attendance for a film premiere" and the "largest attendance for a film screening of a documentary film".

=== Other events ===
The Iglesia ni Cristo organized charity events within 2014. In February 15, 2014, the church organized the "Worldwide Walk for those Affected by Typhoon Yolanda". The charity walk raised funds for victims of Typhoon Haiyan, domestically known as Super Typhoon Yolanda, which struck the country the year before. The walk broke two Guinness records; the largest charity walk in a single venue (175,509 participants in Manila) and the largest charity walk conducted within 24 hours in multiple venues (135 sites worldwide with 519,221 participants).

Under the church's Lingap sa Mamamayan (Aid to Humanity) program, its relief goods operations on February 22, 2014 in Palayan, Nueva Ecija broke another Guinness record particularly for the most number of hunger relief packs distributed within eight hours. Lingap sa Mamamayan was established in 1981.

== See also ==
- 500 Years of Christianity in the Philippines
