= JRLDM =

Filipino rapper and songwriter

- Born: Jerald Mallari; Mariveles, Bataan, Philippines
- Genres: Pinoy hip hop; R&B; Alternative rock
- Occupations: Rapper; Songwriter; Record producer
- Years active: 2020–present
- Labels: Warner Music Philippines (Music Colony)

Jerald Mallari, known professionally as JRLDM (pronounced "Jerald Damn"), is a Filipino rapper, singer, and songwriter from Bataan. He is signed to Music Colony Records, a sub-label of Warner Music Philippines. He is best known for his 2020 single "Patiwakal" and his collaborations with hip-hop artists such as Gloc-9 and Loonie. He is known for his melodic rap style and lyrics about mental health. In 2022, he received the Best Rap/Hip Hop Recording award at the Awit Awards.

== Early life ==
Jerald Mallari was born and raised in Mariveles, Bataan. He was raised by a single mother and is the second of three brothers. Growing up, he listened to OPM on the radio and taught himself to play the guitar. He began writing songs in 2009 and started recording music in 2011 using a second-hand computer.

Before pursuing music full-time, Mallari worked various manual labor jobs in Bataan's factories, including textile and garment manufacturing. He worked in more than 20 different factories while making music on his days off. Mallari stated that the music scene in his province was small and primarily focused on bands, making it difficult for him to join groups as a hip-hop fan. He eventually learned music production and rapping under the mentorship of King Promdi of VVS Collective.

== Career ==
=== 2020–2021: Beginnings and signing ===
In July 2020, Mallari released the four-track EP Look MOM I’m Flying. He considered this project his final attempt at a music career before planning to work overseas. One of the tracks from the EP, "Patiwakal" (transl. Suicide), went viral online after its music video was featured on the platform Local. The song dealt with themes of self-harm and depression, garnering millions of views on YouTube.

Following this attention, Mallari was discovered by Ryan "Juss Rye" Armamento of the Sun Valley Crew. Armamento signed JRLDM to Music Colony Records, a hip-hop sub-label under Warner Music Philippines. In October 2021, JRLDM released his first single under the label, titled "Lason" (transl. Poison). The song depicted struggles with vice and society. In December 2021, he released the single "Lagi Na Lang" featuring rapper Gloc-9. The song describes the pain of repetitive heartbreak.

=== 2022–present: Mood Swing and accolades ===
In March 2022, JRLDM released the single "Eh Papaano", a collaboration with singer Jikamarie. His debut studio album, Mood Swing, was released on April 22, 2022. An album launch event was held at Mandala Park, featuring guests such as Owfuck and Loonie. NME gave the album a positive review, describing it as "masterfully ordered chaos" and praising JRLDM's vocal and stylistic range. The album included the track "Kuwan", which criticized inauthenticity in the hip-hop scene.

Later in 2022, JRLDM released the single "Biktima" (transl. Victim), which touched on the social and political landscape of the Philippines following the national elections. The track featured guitar work by Vie Dela Rosa of the band Dilaw. In September 2022, he participated in The Regionals: Philippines, a cypher project by HipHopDX Asia, alongside artists Loonie, Jon Protege, Mhot, and Arkho. The track was produced by American producer Illmind.

At the 35th Awit Awards in November 2022, JRLDM won the award for Best Rap/Hip Hop Recording for "Lagi Na Lang". He was also nominated for Best New Artist in a Collaboration for the same track. In April 2023, he performed at the "We Play Here" concert celebrating Warner Music Philippines' 30th anniversary alongside labelmates such as Felip and Lola Amour. In September 2023, he performed at the Music Colony Records 2nd Anniversary event.

JRLDM received a nomination for Wishclusive Collaboration of the Year at the 10th Wish 107.5 Music Awards for his song "IISA" with Jikamarie.

== Artistry ==
JRLDM's music is often noted for its "dark" and "melancholic" atmosphere. He has stated in interviews that he does not intentionally set out to make dark music, but is naturally drawn to sad songs and heavier emotions. His lyrics frequently address personal topics including depression, anxiety, and substance use. NME described his style as a mix of multisyllabic rapping and crooning, with production influences ranging from R&B to 1990s Alternative rock.

He has cited Gloc-9 and Loonie as major influences on his rapping style. He has also expressed that he writes his music to bring awareness to mental health issues rather than to glorify them.

== Discography ==
=== Studio albums ===
- Mood Swing (2022)

=== Extended plays ===
- Look MOM I'm Flying (2020)

=== Singles ===
- "Patiwakal" (2020)
- "Parasitiko" (featuring Lexus) (2020)
- "Lason" (2021)
- "Lagi Na Lang" (featuring Gloc-9) (2021)
- "Bahala Na Bukas" (2022)
- "Para Sa Sarili" (2022)
- "Eh Papaano" (featuring Jikamarie) (2022)
- "Biktima" (2022)
- "The Regionals: Philippines" (with Loonie, Arkho, Mhot, Jon Protege) (2022)
- "IISA" (with Jikamarie) (2024)

== Awards and nominations ==
Year	Award	Category	Nominated work	Result	Ref.
2022	Awit Awards	Best Rap/Hip Hop Recording	"Lagi Na Lang" (featuring Gloc-9)	Won	
2022	Awit Awards	Best New Artist in a Collaboration	"Lagi Na Lang" (featuring Gloc-9)	Nominated	
2023	Wish 107.5 Music Awards	Wishclusive Collaboration of the Year	"Lagi Na Lang" (featuring Gloc-9)	Won	
2023	Wish 107.5 Music Awards	Wishclusive Hip-hop Performance of the Year	"Para sa Sarili"	Won	
2025	Wish 107.5 Music Awards	Wishclusive Collaboration of the Year	"IISA" (with Jikamarie)	Nominated	
