= Philippine Basketball Association opening ceremonies =

The Philippine Basketball Association hosts an opening ceremony to start each season since its establishment in 1975. The event includes musical performances, a team parade, and speeches from key figures in the league. It is then succeeded by the first game or first two games of the elimination round of the first conference of the season.

== Overview ==
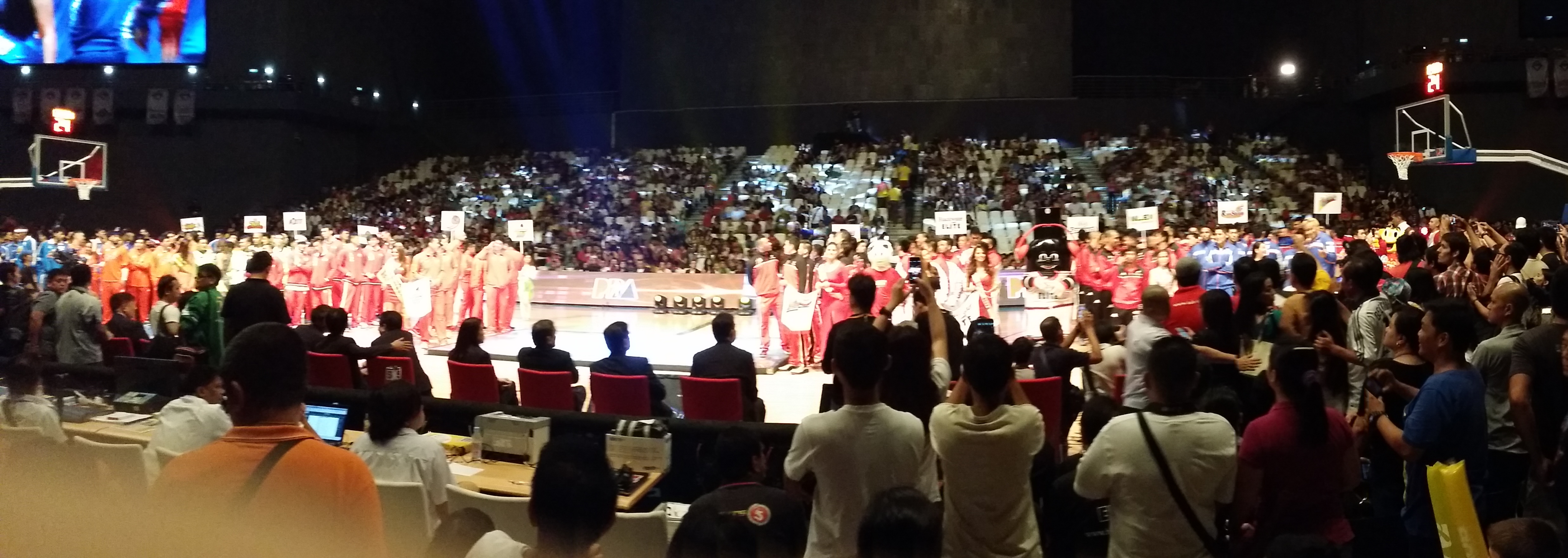
The parade of teams during the opening ceremonies of the 2014-15 PBA season at the Philippine Arena.

An opening ceremonies is held to mark the start of the season since the league's maiden season in 1975. The ceremonies typically start with an entertainment show, depending on the theme for that year. Usual highlights are performances of Filipino artists and speeches from the league commissioner and other invited guests. A parade of participating teams follows afterwards. Each team marches into the venue together with their muses. After all of the teams have paraded, the season's chairman of the PBA Board of Governors gives a speech and afterwards, he will officially declare the season open.

After the opening ceremonies, a lone game, the first game for the season, will be played. From 1975 to 1994, two games were played immediately following the ceremonies.

== Venue ==
From 1975 to 1984, the league opened its season at the Araneta Coliseum in Quezon City, the league's primary venue for its games. After the league transferred its operations at the University of Life Theater and Recreational Arena (ULTRA) in Pasig, the opening ceremonies were exclusively held there from 1985 to 1992. After the fallout between the PBA and the Philippine Sports Commission, which operates the ULTRA, the league transferred its operations at the then newly built Cuneta Astrodome in Pasay in 1993. The league's opening ceremonies and the majority of its games were held at the Astrodome from 1993 to 1998. After the exclusive contract in the Cuneta Astrodome expired in 1999, the league returned to its previous home, The ULTRA, now renamed as the PhilSports Arena and held its opening ceremonies there for the first time in six years. When the league celebrated its 25th anniversary in 2000, the opening ceremonies were held at the Araneta Coliseum, where the league was inaugurated. The ceremonies were held at the venue exclusively until 2013.

For the 2013–14 season, the league's opening ceremonies was held at three different locations covering Luzon (Smart Araneta Coliseum, Quezon City), Visayas (Cebu Coliseum), and Mindanao (USEP Gymnasium, Davao City).

The league opened its 2014–15 season at the Philippine Arena in Bocaue, Bulacan; this was the first time that the league had its opening ceremonies outside Metro Manila and it was the first non-Iglesia ni Cristo and commercial event that was held in the arena.

The 2015–16 season opener was supposed to be held on October 18, 2015, at the Smart Araneta Coliseum but was suspended due to the onslaught of Typhoon Lando (international name: Kuppo). Instead, the opening was held on October 21 at the Mall of Asia Arena in Pasay. This was the first time for the following: suspension of opening ceremonies due to bad weather, an opening ceremonies that was held on a weekday, and the first opening ceremonies held in the Mall of Asia Arena.

Due to COVID-19 related restrictions, the 2021 opening ceremonies were held at the Ynares Sports Arena with no audience in the venue. The traditional parade of teams with muses was not done and a “simple” opening ceremonies were held instead. Players were present virtually.

== Venues ==
Season	Date	Venue	Games	Ref.
1975	April 9	Araneta Coliseum	Concepcion Carrier vs. Mariwasa-Noritake; Toyota vs. U/Tex	
1976	March 21	Araneta Coliseum		
1977	April 17	Araneta Coliseum		
1978	April 16	Araneta Coliseum		
1979	April 1	Araneta Coliseum		
1980	March 16	Araneta Coliseum		
1981	March 8	Araneta Coliseum		
1982	March 7	Araneta Coliseum		
1983	March 6	Araneta Coliseum		
1984	March 25	Araneta Coliseum		
1985	March 3	The Ultra		
1986	April 6	The Ultra		
1987	March 22	The Ultra	Hills Bros. vs. Magnolia; Tanduay vs. Great Taste	
1988	March 20	The Ultra	Great Taste vs. Shell; San Miguel vs. Purefoods	
1989	March 5	The Ultra	Alaska vs. Presto; San Miguel vs. Shell	
1990	February 18	The Ultra	Pop Cola vs. Pepsi; Purefoods vs. San Miguel	
1991	February 17	The Ultra	Pepsi vs. Shell; San Miguel vs. Purefoods	
1992	February 9	The Ultra	Presto vs. Swift; Purefoods vs. Shell	
1993	February 28	Cuneta Astrodome	Shell vs. Sta. Lucia; Ginebra vs. 7-Up	
1994	March 6	Cuneta Astrodome	Tondeña vs. Sta. Lucia; Alaska vs. Shell	
1995	February 19	Cuneta Astrodome	Ginebra vs. Shell	
1996	February 18	Cuneta Astrodome	Purefoods vs. San Miguel	
1997	February 16	Cuneta Astrodome	Alaska vs. Mobiline	
1998	February 1	Cuneta Astrodome	Pop Cola vs. San Miguel	
1999	February 7	PhilSports Arena	Mobiline vs. Tanduay	
2000	February 20	Araneta Coliseum	Red Bull vs. Barangay Ginebra	
2001	January 28	Araneta Coliseum	Alaska vs. Sta. Lucia	
2002	February 10	Araneta Coliseum	Coca-Cola vs. FedEx	
2003	February 23	Araneta Coliseum	Alaska vs. Sta. Lucia	
2004 Fiesta	February 22	Araneta Coliseum	Barangay Ginebra vs. Shell	
2004–05	October 3	Araneta Coliseum	San Miguel vs. Talk 'N Text	
2005–06	October 2	Araneta Coliseum	Red Bull vs. Purefoods	
2006–07	October 1	Araneta Coliseum	Welcoat vs. Barangay Ginebra	
2007–08	October 14	Araneta Coliseum	Air21 vs. Magnolia	
2008–09	October 4	Araneta Coliseum	Coca-Cola vs. Talk 'N Text	
2009–10	October 11	Araneta Coliseum	Burger King vs. Purefoods	
2010–11	October 3	Araneta Coliseum	Barangay Ginebra vs. Meralco	
2011–12	October 2	Smart Araneta Coliseum	Rain or Shine vs. Barangay Ginebra	
2012–13	September 30	Smart Araneta Coliseum	Barangay Ginebra vs. GlobalPort	
2013–14	November 17	Smart Araneta Coliseum (main venue); Cebu Coliseum, Cebu City; USEP Gymnasium, Davao City	Barangay Ginebra vs. San Mig Super Coffee; Meralco vs. Talk 'N Text; Alaska vs. Rain or Shine	
2014–15	October 19	Philippine Arena	Kia vs. Blackwater; Talk 'N Text vs. Barangay Ginebra	
2015–16	October 21	Mall of Asia Arena	Rain or Shine vs. Star	
2016–17	November 20	Smart Araneta Coliseum	San Miguel vs. Star	
2017–18	December 17	Smart Araneta Coliseum	San Miguel vs. Phoenix	
2019	January 13	Philippine Arena	Barangay Ginebra vs. TNT	
2020 (Season 45)	March 8	Smart Araneta Coliseum	San Miguel vs. Magnolia	
2021 (Season 46)	July 16	Ynares Sports Arena	Alaska vs. Blackwater; Meralco vs. NorthPort	
2022–23 (Season 47)	June 5	Smart Araneta Coliseum	Converge vs. Rain or Shine; Magnolia vs. TNT	
2023–24 (Season 48)	November 5	Smart Araneta Coliseum	Magnolia vs. TNT	
2024–25 (Season 49)	August 18	Smart Araneta Coliseum	Meralco vs. Magnolia	
2025–26 (Season 50)	October 5	Smart Araneta Coliseum	Magnolia vs. Barangay Ginebra	
