= Ciudad de Victoria =

Tourism enterprise zone in the Philippines

- Ciudad de Victoria in 2026

Project
- Opening date: 2014
- Operator: Maligaya Development Corporation
- Owner: Iglesia ni Cristo

Location
- Interactive map of Ciudad de Victoria
- Coordinates: 14°47′39″N 120°57′06″E
- Country: Philippines
- Province: Bulacan
- Towns: Santa Maria and Bocaue

Ciudad de Victoria (Spanish for "City of Victory" or "Victory City") also known as the Philippine Arena Complex is a 140-hectare tourism enterprise zone in the towns of Bocaue and Santa Maria in Bulacan, Philippines. It is located north of Metro Manila along the North Luzon Expressway. The site where it is located used to be a farmland and was converted and being developed into a mixed-use area that will integrate residential and office buildings as well as shopping, entertainment, leisure, education, business and sports complex. It is owned by the Iglesia ni Cristo (INC), a Filipino-based indigenous Christian religious organization, through its educational institution, the New Era University, and operated by Maligaya Development Corporation. It was inaugurated on July 21, 2014, in commemoration of INC's centennial celebration on July 27, 2014.

== History ==
On August 17, 2011, the Iglesia Ni Cristo executive minister Eduardo Manalo led the groundbreaking of the Philippine Arena, a 55,000-seater indoor domed arena, and other infrastructures in the complex. After three years of construction, on July 21, 2014, Philippine president Benigno Aquino III and INC executive minister Eduardo Manalo led the inauguration of the Ciudad de Victoria on time for the INC centennial celebration on July 27, 2014.

During the COVID-19 pandemic, three tents near the Philippine Arena were set up as isolation facilities for COVID-19 patients.

== Developments ==
Philippine Arena

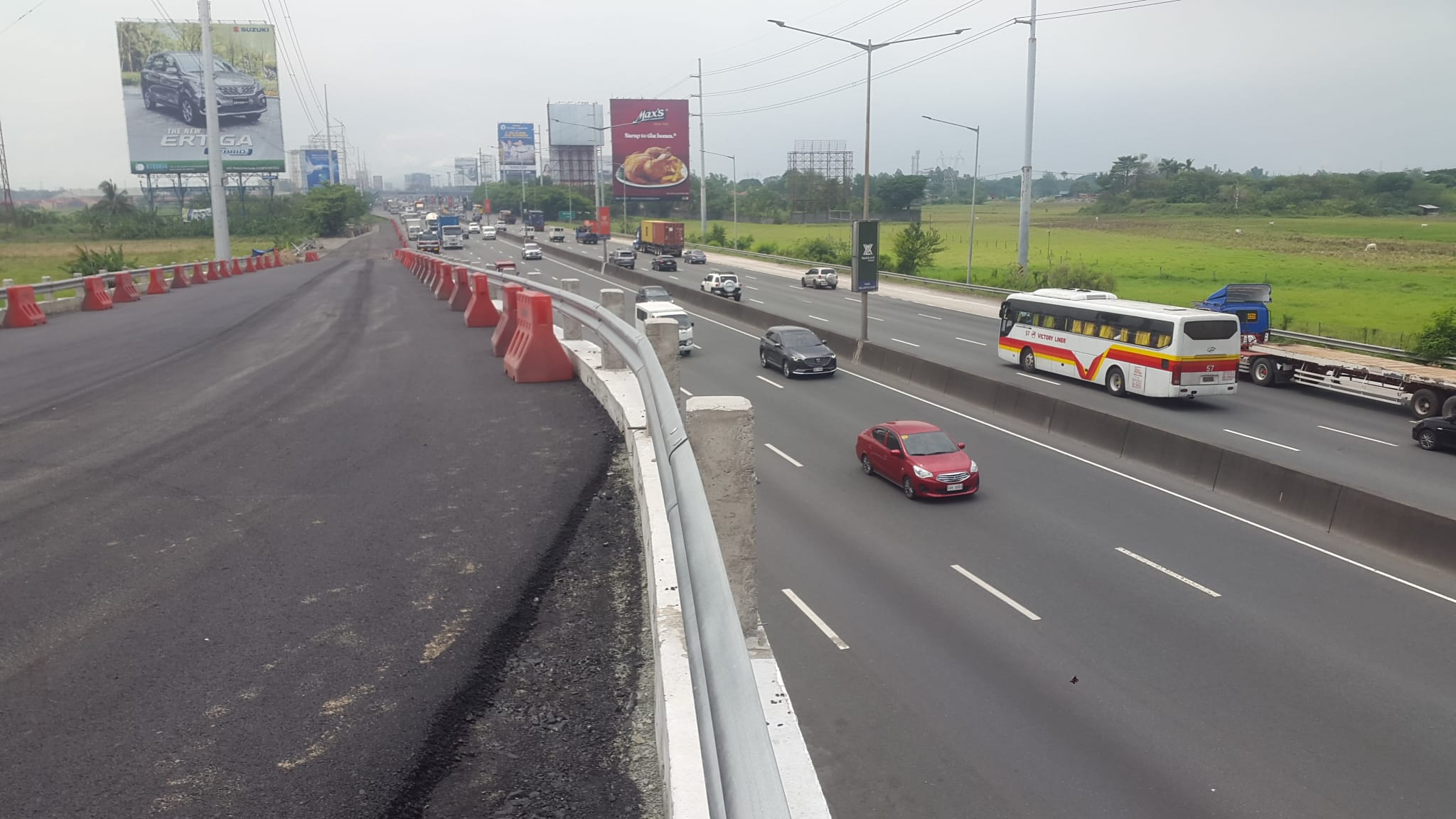
North Luzon Expressway–Ciudad de Victoria Interchange

The first phase development includes the Philippine Arena, which is currently the largest indoor arena in the Philippines, in Asia and in the world with a seating capacity of 55,000; The largest stadium in the Philippines with 20,000-seater Philippine Sports Stadium; The two-hectare Sports Center, an indoor aquatic and tennis center the first in Northern Luzon; and the initial four phases of residential developments. The second phase development includes the Eraño G. Manalo (EGM) Medical Center, an 11-storey 1st class modern hospital which is the first of its kind in Northern Luzon with 1,000-bed capacity; the New Era University Bocaue Campus, with specialization in sports science, architecture and medical education; and the phase also include additional hotels & residential developments. On May 18, 2018, an Iglesia ni Cristo Chapel was dedicated within the Ciudad de Victoria, catering to those who lived nearby and the voluntary maintenance workers who are members of INC.

== Landscape ==
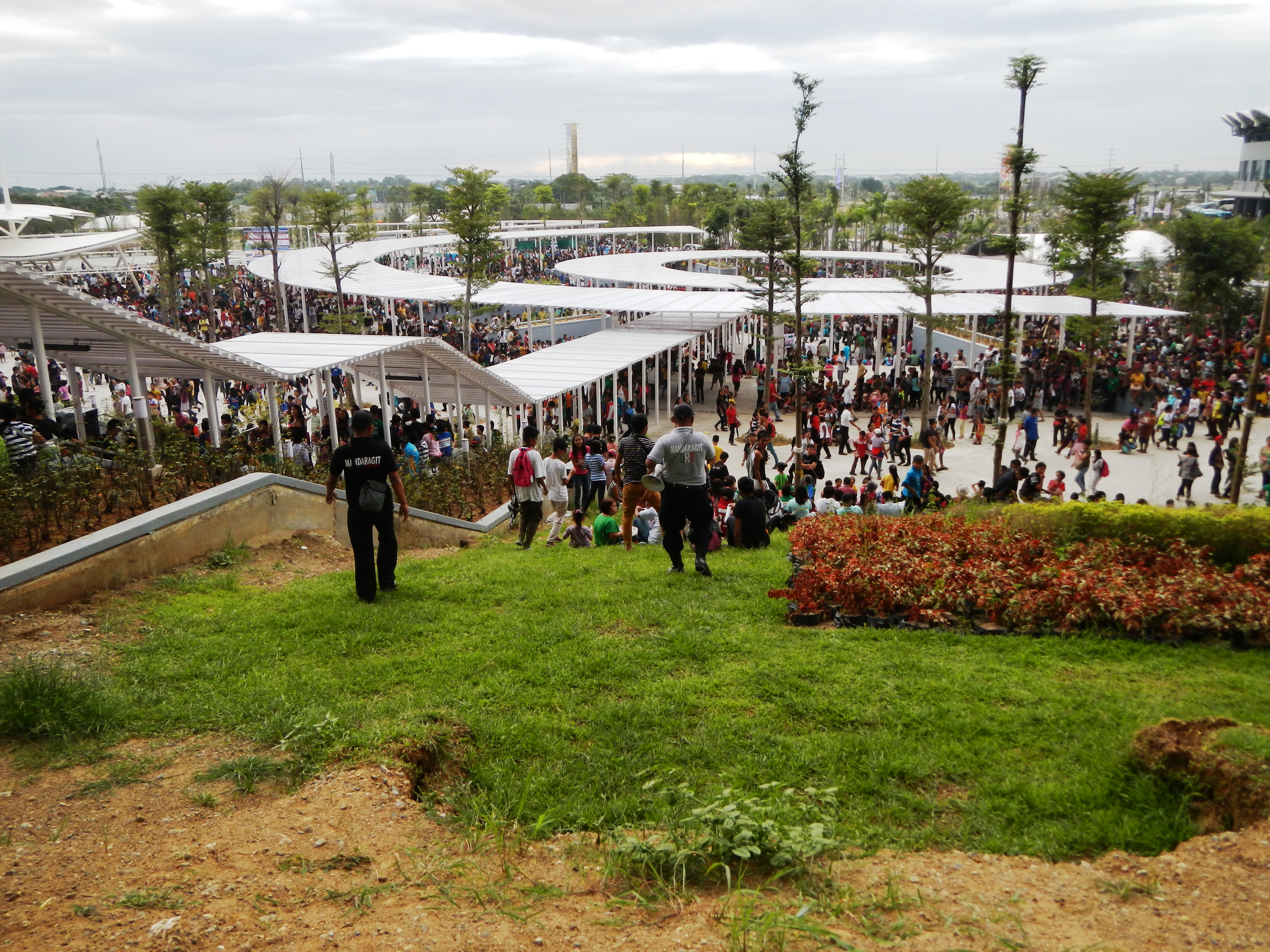
Greenery at the paved area of the Ciudad de Victoria.

PWP Landscape Architecture, the firm who landscaped the National September 11 Memorial & Museum, designed the landscape for the arena and the whole complex of Ciudad de Victoria. Headed by Chris Dimond, The Landscape Architect of the Ciudad De Victoria. The landscape design for phase one includes: The Philippine Arena, the Stadium Gardens, and the Water Gardens. The Philippine Arena landscape design is defined by a curvilinear system of formal trees and covered walkways that echo the elliptical form of the Arena connecting two arrival areas, two plazas and a grand stair that leads to the arena. The Stadium Gardens are defined by vertical layers of palm trees, drifts of informal flowering gardens, and dense hedges that expose two clearings for accommodating large casual gatherings or organized events.

A series of outdoor plazas, gardens and performance venues form the setting for the development including: The North and South Arrival Plazas, The Promontory Plaza, The Great Stairs, and Ciudad de Victoria Plaza that are all related to each other with two cross axes (N-S and E-W) that intersect at the Promontory Plaza. These spaces are woven together both by a spine of formal trees and covered walkways that echo the elliptical form of the Arena.

== Records ==
On December 31, 2015, the INC claimed three records during its "Countdown to 2016" event at the Ciudad de Victoria, these are Largest Fireworks Display, Longest Line of Sparklers Lit in A Relay, and Most Sparklers Lit Simultaneously.
