= Philippine Arena =

Indoor arena in Bulacan, Philippines

- Interactive map of Philippine Arena
- Location: Ciudad de Victoria, Bulacan, Philippines
- Owner: New Era University (Iglesia ni Cristo)
- Operator: Maligaya Development Corporation
- Record attendance: 55,000 (Eat Bulaga!: Sa Tamang Panahon, October 24, 2015)
- Field size: 220 m × 170 m (720 ft × 560 ft)
- Public transit: 5 North Luzon Express Terminal

Tenants
- Philippines national basketball team (2014–present); Philippine Basketball Association (out-of-town games)
- Building details

General information
- Architectural style: Modernist
- Groundbreaking: August 17, 2011; 15 years ago
- Completed: May 30, 2014; 12 years ago
- Inaugurated: July 21, 2014; 12 years ago
- Cost: US$213 million (₱9.4 billion)

Height
- Height: 65 m (213 ft)

Dimensions
- Diameter: 227 m × 179 m (745 ft × 587 ft)

Technical details
- Floor count: 4
- Grounds: 36,443.6 m^{2} (392,276 sq ft)

Design and construction
- Architecture firm: Populous
- Developer: New San Jose Builders
- Structural engineer: Buro Happold
- Main contractor: Hanwha Engineering and Construction

Other information
- Seating capacity: 55,000

The Philippine Arena is a multipurpose indoor arena located within the Ciudad de Victoria tourism enterprise zone in the towns of Bocaue and Santa Maria, Bulacan, Philippines. It is located about 30 kilometers (19 mi) north of Manila. With a maximum seating capacity of 55,000, the arena is the world's second-largest indoor arena after the KJC King Dome in Davao City (the Philippine Arena was the world's largest from its opening on July 21, 2014, until the dome's opening on September 1, 2026). The arena was one of the centerpieces of the many centennial projects built by the Iglesia ni Cristo (INC) for their centennial celebration on July 27, 2014. The arena is legally owned by the New Era University, an educational institution of the INC. The arena was officially recognized by the Guinness World Records as the largest mixed-use indoor theater in the world on July 27, 2014.

== History ==
=== Construction ===
In 2011, South Korean firm Hanwha Engineering and Construction won the contract to manage the construction of the Philippine Arena. Hanwha outbested bids from Filipino firm EEI Corporation and done on August 17. Hanwha announced that it had completed the construction of the indoor arena on May 30, 2014. The venue was not formally inaugurated until almost two months later.

=== Inauguration ===
The Philippine Arena, along with Ciudad de Victoria, was officially inaugurated on July 21, 2014. Philippine President Benigno Aquino III and Iglesia ni Cristo Executive Minister Eduardo Manalo unveiled the marker of Ciudad de Victoria.

== Building details ==
=== Concept ===
The initial design concept of the Philippine arena was inspired by narra tree, the mother tree of the Philippines, and the root of banyan tree. The roof was inspired by Nipa Hut.

=== Architecture ===
Populous, a global mega-architecture firm, designed the arena through their office in Brisbane, Australia. The official website of the sports facility describe's the structure's architectural style as Modernist. The arena has been master-planned to enable at least 50,000 people to gather inside the building and a further 50,000 to gather at a ‘live site’ or plaza outside to share in major events. The seating bowl of the arena is a one-sided bowl and is partitioned into two parts, the upper and the lower bowl each with approximately 25,000 seating capacity. The lower bowl is the most used part of the building and the architectural design allows for easy separation of the lower bowl from the upper tier, by curtaining with acoustic and thermal properties. A retractable seating of 2,000 people capacity is also installed behind the stage which is used by the choir of the Iglesia ni Cristo for events of the church.

The seating layout of the arena is different from that of a standard arena where the stage is at the middle and is surrounded by seats. The seating of the arena closely resembles that of a Greek amphitheater, built in a semi-circle with the seats at the sides and front of the arena stage. The seatings are divided into three sections. Each of the sections are colored green, white and red: the colors of the Iglesia ni Cristo flag.

The arena has four floors or levels. Level 1 is the stage level, Level 2 is the main access level open to the general viewing public, Level 3 is the VIP area which also houses conference rooms with views facing the main plaza outside the indoor arena building, and Level 4 is the upper concourse.

Furthermore, contractor Hanwha hired their own architecture firm, Haeanh Architects for the project.

=== Structure ===
Interior - upper box lobby

Built on 99,200 square meters (1,068,000 sq ft) of land, the arena has a dome over 9,000 square meters (97,000 sq ft). The oval roof has a dimension of 227 m × 179 m (745 ft × 587 ft) and contains 9,000 tons of steel work. The roof was made as a separate unit to reduce burden on the arena with extra load. The arena is 65 meters (213 ft) in height, or about fifteen stories high and founded on pile construction. About a third of the dead load of the building was designed for earthquake loads. The building was also divided into multiple structures to strengthen the arena's earthquake resistance.

=== Landscape ===
PWP Landscape Architecture, the firm who landscaped the National September 11 Memorial & Museum, designed the landscape for the arena and the whole complex of Ciudad de Victoria. For the arena, a series of outdoor plazas, gardens and performance venues form the setting for the development including: The North and South Arrival Plazas, The Promontory Plaza, The Great Stairs, and Ciudad de Victoria Plaza that are all related to each other with two cross axes (N-S and E-W) that intersect at the Promontory Plaza. Two fountains that can shoot waters up to 15 meters (49 ft) are also installed in front of the arena.

== Uses ==
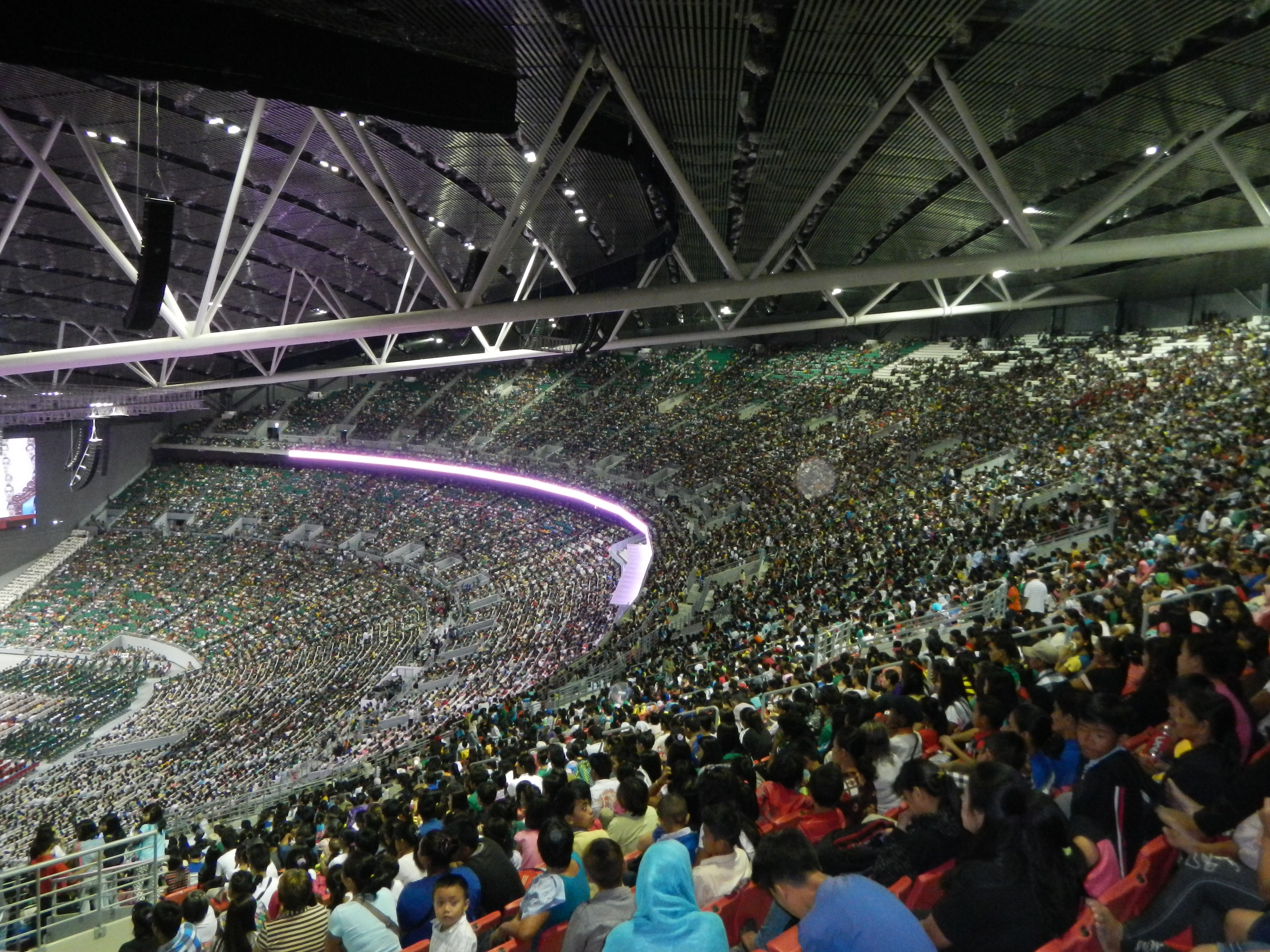
An Iglesia ni Cristo event being held at the arena in 2014

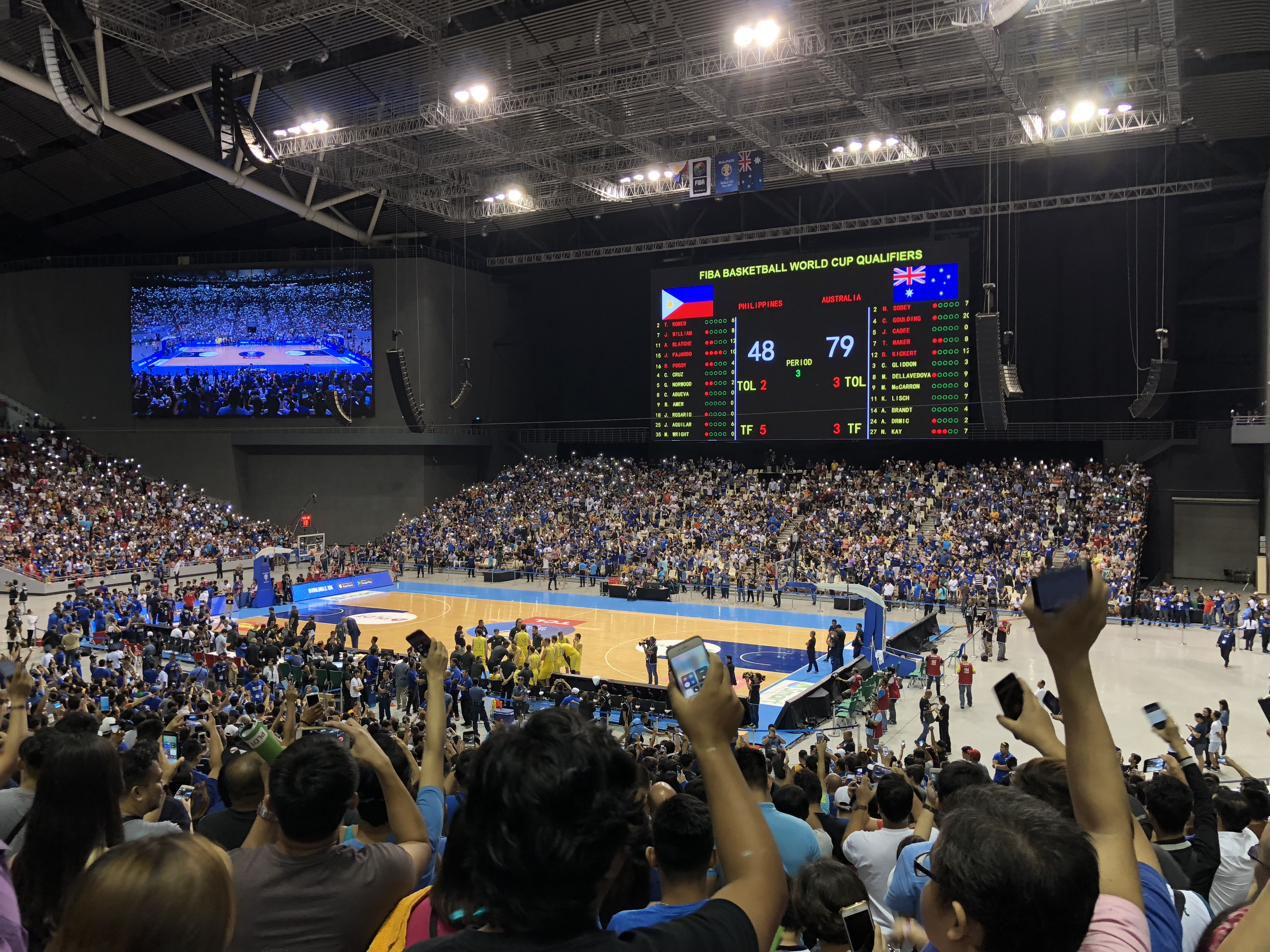
The arena during the Philippines vs. Australia FIBA World Cup qualifying game in July 2018

The arena serves multiple purposes, hosting major church gatherings of the Iglesia ni Cristo (INC) and functioning as a versatile sports and concert venue. It accommodates various events, including boxing, basketball, and live music performances, but not association football or other field events due to its limited size. For field events, the adjacent Philippine Sports Stadium, also owned by the INC, is used instead. Every seat in the arena offers a clear line of sight, even with different configurations such as church ceremonies, boxing matches, tennis, concerts, or indoor gymnastics. The INC allows non-Iglesia tenants to use the arena but reserves the right to prohibit activities that violate its religious principles, such as gambling-related events and cockfighting.

== Notable events ==
=== Basketball ===
==== PBA games ====
On October 19, 2014, the Philippine Arena hosted its first commercial and non-INC event with the opening ceremonies of the 2014–15 PBA Philippine Cup. It was attended by 52,612 people, making it the largest attendance record for an opening ceremony in PBA history. It again hosted the opening ceremonies for 2019 PBA Philippine Cup on January 13, 2019, attended by 23,711.

The most attended PBA game of all time was recorded in the arena on January 15, 2023, when Barangay Ginebra San Miguel played Bay Area Dragons in front of a crowd of 54,589 for Game 7 of the 2022–23 PBA Commissioner's Cup Finals. It broke the previous record of 54,086 set back on October 27, 2017, at the same venue during Game 7 of the 2017 Governors' Cup Finals. Game 6 of the same series on October 25 also recorded a crowd of 53,624.

- October 19, 2014 – 2014–15 PBA Philippine Cup with a crowd of 52,612; Kia Sorento defeated Blackwater Elite in the first game, 80–66; Barangay Ginebra defeated Talk 'N Text in the second game, 101–81.
- December 25, 2016 – 2016–17 PBA Philippine Cup Eliminations with a crowd of 25,000: Mahindra Floodbuster beat Blackwater Elite in the first game, 97–93, while Barangay Ginebra defeated Star Hotshots in the second game, 86–79.
- 2017 PBA Governors' Cup finals:
  - October 22, 2017 – Game 5: Barangay Ginebra defeated Meralco Bolts, 85–74, in front of 36,445. First PBA finals held in the arena.
  - October 25, 2017 – Game 6: Meralco Bolts defeated Barangay Ginebra, 98–91, in front of 53,642.
  - October 27, 2017 – Game 7: Barangay Ginebra defeated Meralco Bolts, 101–96, in front of 54,086.
- 2017–18 PBA Philippine Cup eliminations:
  - December 25, 2017 – NLEX Road Warriors defeated GlobalPort Batang Pier in the first game, 115–104, while Barangay Ginebra defeated Magnolia Hotshots Pambansang Manok in the second game, 89–78, in front of 22,531.
  - February 18, 2018 – NLEX Road Warriors beat Blackwater Elite in the first game, 93–90, while Meralco Bolts defeated Barangay Ginebra in the second game, 84–82.
- January 13, 2019 – 2019 PBA Philippine Cup: Barangay Ginebra defeated TNT KaTropa, 90–79, in front of 23,711.
- January 15, 2023 – 2022–23 PBA Commissioner's Cup Finals Game 7: Barangay Ginebra defeated Bay Area Dragons, 114–99. The match recorded a crowd of 54,589, making it the largest attendance record for a PBA game.

==== FIBA 3x3 World Cup ====
The 2018 FIBA 3x3 World Cup was hosted by the Philippines on June 8–12, 2018 with Philippine Arena as the venue. Serbia won the men's tournament, while the women's tournament was won by Italy. The event was co-organized by FIBA.

==== FIBA Basketball World Cup ====
The Philippine Arena was one of five venues for the 2023 FIBA Basketball World Cup, which the Philippines hosted from August 25 to September 10, 2023. It served as the venue for the first two games of Group A on August 25, 2023, including the Philippines' opening game against the Dominican Republic, which broke the attendance record for a FIBA Basketball World Cup game with 38,115 spectators. It was originally set to host the final round, but it was moved to the SM Mall of Asia Arena in Metro Manila due to logistical and traffic concerns.

==== FIBA World Cup Qualification events ====
- July 2, 2018 – 2019 FIBA Basketball World Cup qualification: Philippines vs. Australia, 22,181 in attendance.
- February 24 and 27, 2023 – 2023 FIBA Basketball World Cup qualification: Philippines vs. Lebanon

=== Concerts ===
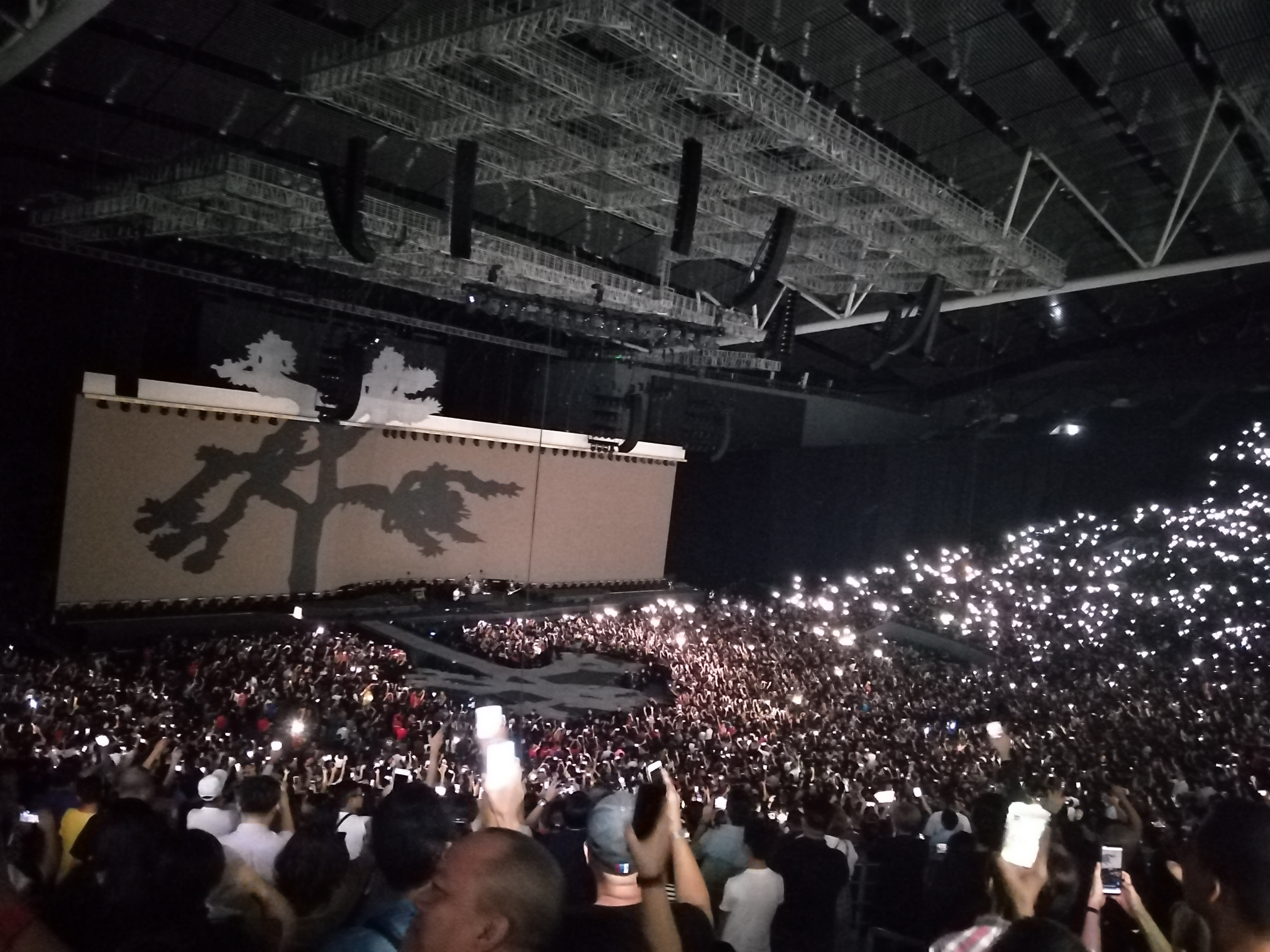
The Philippine Arena during U2's Joshua Tree concert on December 11, 2019.

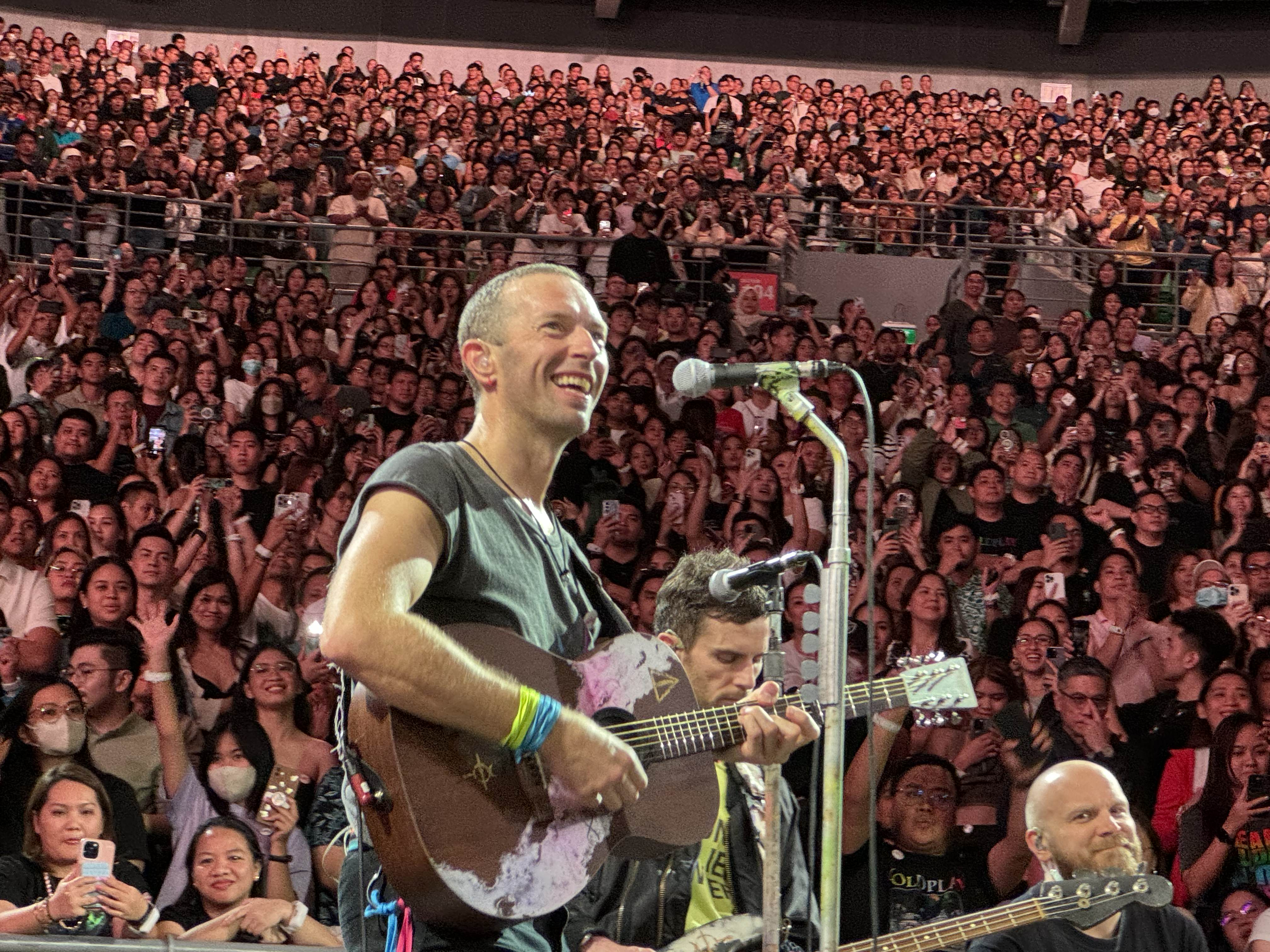
Coldplay performs for over 48,000 fans at the Philippine Arena on January 20, 2024, during their Music of the Spheres Tour.

The Philippine Arena has hosted several concerts by both local and international artists. Notable acts who have performed at the venue include Blackpink, the first musical act to hold multiple nights and sell out two shows at the arena with their Born Pink World Tour; Bruno Mars, the first solo artist to sell out two shows at the arena with his 2022–24 tour; Coldplay, who hold the record for the highest attendance by a musical act at the arena with a combined total of 96,079 attendees during their Music of the Spheres World Tour; BINI, the first local act to headline and sell out a show at the arena with their 2025 world tour; and SB19, the first local act to hold and sell out two consecutive shows at the arena, and the first Filipino act to sell out a concert at the arena in less than seven hours, with their Simula at Wakas World Tour.

=== Other events ===
- On November 30, 2019, the Philippine Arena hosted the opening ceremony of 2019 Southeast Asian Games. It was the first time that a SEA Games opening ceremony was held in an indoor arena.
- Sa Tamang Panahon, a special episode of Kalyeserye segment from the noontime variety show Eat Bulaga!, was held in the arena on October 24, 2015. It was reportedly attended by a record of 55,000 people after it sold out three days after the announcement.
- The UniTeam alliance of presidential candidate Bongbong Marcos, vice-presidential candidate Sara Duterte, and their allies in the 2022 Philippine general elections, held their proclamation rally at the arena on February 8, 2022.
- The 8th edition of the South Korean awards show Asia Artist Awards was held at the arena on December 14, 2023.

== Attendance records ==
Type	Event	Attendance	Date	Ref.
Music concert	Coldplay; Music of the Spheres World Tour	96,079 (combined)	January 19–20, 2024	
Basketball	Barangay Ginebra vs. Bay Area Dragons; 2022–23 PBA Commissioner's Cup Finals Game 7	54,589	January 15, 2023	
Variety show	Eat Bulaga! Sa Tamang Panahon	55,000	October 24, 2015	

== In popular media ==
- The Philippine Arena was featured in a documentary called Man Made Marvels: Quake Proof. It aired on Discovery Channel on December 25, 2013, and focused on making structures in the Philippines more safe from natural disasters in general such as earthquake and typhoons.
- The live television event of Sa Tamang Panahon, a special episode of Kalyeserye segment from Eat Bulaga!, drew around 55,000 people on October 24, 2015, making it one of the most attended event held in the Philippine Arena.
- Disney+ Philippines' launch event A Night of Wonder with Disney+ was held at the Philippine Arena on November 17, 2022, featuring local Filipino singers performing Disney hit songs in an illuminated empty arena around projections of clips from various Disney films.

== See also ==
- List of events at the Philippine Arena
- Iglesia ni Cristo
- Ciudad de Victoria
- SM Mall of Asia Arena
- Araneta Coliseum
- Philippines–Australia basketball brawl
- List of indoor arenas in the Philippines

Events
Preceded by Parc des Chantiers de I'lle (France) Nantes	Host of the FIBA 3x3 World Cup; 2018	Succeeded by Museumplein (Netherlands) Amsterdam
