= 2022 in Philippine television =

The following is a list of events affecting Philippine television in 2022. Events listed include: television show debuts, finales and cancellations; channel and streaming launches, closures and rebrandings; as well as information about controversies and carriage disputes.

== Events ==
=== January ===
- January 1
  - BEAM TV migrated its broadcast signal reception to digital terrestrial transmission from switching off its analog frequency in nationwide areas after 10 years.
  - Colours and One Screen have ceased its operations by Cignal TV due to the review of the management's decision through changes in business direction.
  - After 26 years, GMA Artist Center rebranded to "Sparkle GMA Artist Center", which added the Sparkle word to its former name.
  - In colliding with the 35th anniversary, ABS-CBN's flagship newscast TV Patrol silently resumed its free-to-air broadcast through A2Z after almost two years of limited accessibility on pay television airing and digital online streaming resulted to the lapsed of its broadcast franchise in 2020. Alongside its terrestrial return, the newscast updated its new logo, on-air graphics and opening billboard on January 3, as well as some changes on its anchors and segments which introduced in October 2021, while retaining its theme music arrangement song that was used since 2010 and the opening line.
  - Professional volleyball player Alyssa Valdez and singer Anji Salvacion were named as the Top 2 Finalist on the Celebrity Edition of Pinoy Big Brother: Kumunity Season 10.
- January 5
  - Advanced Media Broadcasting System, a broadcast media firm of Prime Asset Ventures, Inc. through Streamtech's Planet Cable owned by a billionaire business magnate and former politician Manny Villar, took over about two broadcasting channels and frequencies previously assigned by ABS-CBN Corporation including VHF Channel 2 (where it given an 18-month temporary permit effective January 6 to operate in test broadcast for the usage of analog TV frequency through Metro Manila) and UHF Channel 16 (where it issued an 18-month provisional authority to operate in use for digital TV frequency through Mega Manila) as announced in a press statement order release on January 25 that had been reviewed by the Department of Justice, the Department of Information and Communications Technology and the Office of the Executive Secretary for no objection on the assignment of vacated and available frequencies in its legal qualifications, after the National Telecommunications Commission recalled all radio frequencies and channels of ABS-CBN following the lapsed of its congressional franchise in 2020.
  - Aliw Broadcasting Corporation (a broadcast organization of ALC Group of Companies that operates a number of Home Radio & DWIZ branded radio stations) took over UHF Channel 23 and Swara Sug Media Corporation (a broadcast arm of the Kingdom of Jesus Christ that operates Sonshine Media Network International led by their church leader and televangelist pastor Apollo C. Quiboloy) took over UHF Channel 43, all previously assigned by AMCARA Broadcasting Network (a former affiliate of ABS-CBN Corporation that was used for blocktime purposes in 1996) where it ordered a provisional authority to operate in use for digital TV frequency through Manila as announced in a press statement order release on January 26 that had been reviewed by the Department of Justice, the Department of Information and Communications Technology and the Office of the Executive Secretary for no objection on the assignment of vacated and available frequencies in its legal qualifications, after the National Telecommunications Commission recalled all radio frequencies and channels of ABS-CBN following the lapsed of its congressional franchise in 2020.
- January 6 - Sky Cable terminated beIN Sports 2 on its line-up due to the revamping of the network's programming and is set for transferring to a different channel assignment. Meanwhile, the network continued to air via Cignal and G Sat. In addition, beIN Media Group revived beIN Sports 3 as its 2nd incarnation of the said channel after two years and five months of inactivity transmission.
- January 9 - Intercontinental Broadcasting Corporation temporarily stopped its broadcast due to the disinfection of their premises in Quezon City.
- January 10
  - CNN Philippines temporarily stopped its broadcast and limited its programming through online due to the limitations caused by the implementation of health protocols in their broadcast center in Mandaluyong.
  - Premier Tennis rebranded to Premier Sports 2, as a counterpart channel to Premier Sports.
  - Sky Cable returned beIN Sports 2 on their line-up with a new channel assignment after 4 days of halt broadcast on its provider.
- January 15 - ABS-CBN Entertainment and Viu sealed a content partnership to bring top-quality contents to Filipino viewers on the said streaming platform by kicking off on January 22.
- January 19 - SatLite terminated six channels: Al Jazeera, Central Luzon Television, eGG Network, Lifetime, Pinoy Xtreme and Telenovela Channel, on its line-up due to the review of the provider's decision. The following day, SatLite launched eight channels on their line-up: Asian Food Network, Cinemax, DreamWorks Channel (both in separate Tagalog-dubbed and main English-dubbed feeds), HBO Hits, Lotus Macau, Moonbug Kids, Rock Extreme and TAP Edge.
- January 26 - Sky Cable celebrated its 30th anniversary of service provider formation.
- January 29 - iBilib celebrated its tenth anniversary on Philippine television.

=== February ===
- February 4 - The Kapisanan ng mga Brodkaster ng Pilipinas organized their presidential forum, "Panata sa Bayan: The KBP Presidential Candidates Forum" which syndicating aired in over 300 stations nationwide through multiple organization-chapter members on all radio networks and TV channels, as well as other providers, platforms and online streaming worldwide (including A2Z, Advanced Media Broadcasting System, Bombo Radyo Philippines, CNN Philippines, Far East Broadcasting Company, Manila Broadcasting Company, One News, Radio Mindanao Network, Radyo Pilipino, TeleRadyo and TV5/Cignal).
- February 4–20 - The 2022 Winter Olympics was held in Beijing, China. MediaQuest Holdings (Cignal TV) awarded the local rights to the annual games as part of a deal with the Philippine Olympic Committee which aired on One Sports, One Sports+ and Cignal Play. It also marked both the sixth overall consecutive games of Cignal and the third consecutive winter games of MediaQuest (which introduced for the 2014 Winter Olympic Games).
- February 7 - ABS-CBN Entertainment and YouTube extended its partnership to co-produced locally exclusive originals on the said online platform.
- February 15 - Sonshine Media Network International and The Manila Times organized their first presidential debates, "SMNI Presidential Debate 2022" that held at the Okada Manila in Parañaque.
- February 19 - Rock Entertainment Holdings launched Global Trekker in the Philippines.
- February 26–27 - CNN Philippines and BusinessMirror organized their vice presidential (on February 26) and presidential (on February 27) debates, "The Filipino Votes: Presidential and Vice Presidential Debates 2022" that held at the Quadricentennial Pavilion of the University of Santo Tomas in Manila.

=== March ===
- March 2 - TV Patrol celebrated its 35th anniversary on Philippine television.
- March 2–3 - Sonshine Media Network International and The Manila Times organized their two-day senatorial debates, "SMNI Senatorial Debate" that took place at the Okada Manila in Parañaque.
- March 5 - Singer-actor Patrick Quiroz was proclaimed the Ultimate Bida-Oke Sing-lebrity grand winner of the first season of Sing Galing: Sing-lebrity Edition.
- March 10 - SPOTV Now, a streaming service owned by Eclat Media Group, was launched and became available in the Philippines, alongside Hong Kong, Malaysia and Singapore.
- March 12
  - Isabel Laohoo of Leyte and Nathan Juane of Las Piñas were named as the Top 2 Finalist on the Adult Edition of Pinoy Big Brother: Kumunity Season 10.
  - Mari Mar Tua of Pampanga was hailed as the Ultimate Bida-Oke Star grand winner of the first season of Sing Galing!.
- March 16 – MediaQuest Holdings, through TV5 forged a partnership with Viva Films and Regal Entertainment (together with The Passion of the Christ) for the broadcast rights of their respective films on TV5 platforms and channels.
- March 19–20 - The Commission on Elections and Vote Pilipinas (a group made by Impact Hub Manila) organized their PiliPinas Debates 2022: The Turning Point with presidential (for first on March 19) and vice presidential (for first and only on March 20) debates were held at Sofitel Philippine Plaza Manila in Pasay, which simultaneously broadcast on different platforms and providers through TV channels and networks, radio stations, and digital online livestreaming (airing via ABS-CBN News Channel, CNN Philippines, DepEd TV on GMA's digital channel, One News, One PH, People's Television Network, TeleRadyo, TV5 for presidential debates only and UNTV as well as delayed telecast on A2Z and Light TV).
- March 22 - Intercontinental Broadcasting Corporation has switched its airing of aspect ratio format quality on the channel feed and its programming to widescreen format (16:9) as being converted its mitigation of reception through analog and digital signal reception through free TV and other cable and satellite providers after almost 63 years on the usage of broadcast video picture resolution that migrated from fullscreen format (4:3).
- March 26 - Sonshine Media Network International and The Manila Times organized their second and last presidential debates, "The Deep Probe: The SMNI Presidential Candidates Interview" that took place at the Okada Manila in Parañaque.
- March 28 - G Sat terminated Myx and Telenovela Channel on its line-up due to the revamping of the provider's channel space assignments. Myx continued to air via Cignal, SatLite and Sky Cable, while Telenovela Channel continued to air via Cignal and Sky Cable. In addition, G Sat launched TAP Action Flix and TAP Movies on their line-up.
- March 29 - Nation Broadcasting Corporation, a subsidiary of MediaQuest Holdings under PLDT Beneficial Trust Fund that carries One Sports and Radyo5, granted an amendment of its congressional franchise under Republic Act No. 11667 (which previously Republic Act No. 8623), allowing NBC to operate radio and television stations nationwide.

=== April ===
- April 1
  - After eleven months and twenty-six days of broadcasting in the Philippines, WakuWaku Japan has ceased its broadcast operations by SKY Perfect JSAT across Asia due to the review of the management's decision through changes in business direction.
  - Sky Cable terminated HITS on its line-up due to being unable to agree on both sides for the renewal terms on its channel carriage. Meanwhile, the network continued to air via Cignal, G Sat, SatLite and Cablelink.
  - Rock Entertainment Holdings launched Love Nature airing in native 4K resolution, making the first channel broadcast in the Philippines.
- April 3 - The Commission on Elections and Vote Pilipinas (a group made by Impact Hub Manila) organized their PiliPinas Debates 2022: The Turning Point with second and last presidential debates were held at Sofitel Philippine Plaza Manila in Pasay, which simultaneously broadcast on different platforms and providers through TV channels and networks, radio stations, and digital online livestreaming (airing via ABS-CBN News Channel, CNN Philippines, DepEd TV on GMA's digital channel, Intercontinental Broadcasting Corporation, One News, One PH, People's Television Network, TeleRadyo and UNTV).
- April 5 - ABS-CBN Corporation and GMA Network, Inc. sealed a content partnership to license some of the most popular and well-loved movies from Star Cinema airing on GMA's owned local channels.
- April 6 - Globe Telecom through 917Ventures Retirement Fund launched a multi-platform innovative tradigital (traditional and digital) entertainment company, Kroma Entertainment.
- April 7 - Net 25 resumed its free-to-air broadcast through Channel 25's analog channel after almost three years of its mitigation to digital frequency while being on test broadcast in 2018.
- April 8 - As part of TBN's linear rebranding of Hillsong Channels internationally, Hillsong Channel Philippines was rebranded to TBN Inspire in the Philippines.
- April 12 - TeleRadyo celebrated its 15th anniversary of broadcasting on pay television.
- April 19 - ABS-CBN Entertainment and Netflix extended its content partnership to stream ABS-CBN's produced programs through early simultaneous release ahead with the ABS-CBN platforms on the said streaming service beginning on May 13.
- April 22 – Barangay Ginebra San Miguel retains the 2021 PBA Governors' Cup title after defeating the Meralco Bolts 4–2 in a best-of-seven series.

=== May ===
- May 3–6 - The Commission on Elections and the Kapisanan ng mga Brodkaster ng Pilipinas organized their single candidate and team-panel interview format forum, "COMELEC–KBP PiliPinas Forum 2022" with live and pre-recorded schedule tapings that held at various locations on May 2–6, which syndicating aired in over 300 stations nationwide through multiple organization-chapter members on all radio networks and TV channels, as well as other providers, platforms and online streaming worldwide (including ANC, Bombo Radyo Philippines, CNN Philippines, Far East Broadcasting Company, Manila Broadcasting Company, Primax Broadcasting Network, Radio Mindanao Network, Radyo Pilipino, TV5 Network, Inc. and Vanguard Radio Network). Originally intended to be PiliPinas Debates 2022: The Turning Point on April 23–24 with vice presidential (for second and last on April 23) and presidential (for third and last on April 24) town hall debates but later postponed to April 30–May 1 with vice presidential (for second and last on April 30) and presidential (for third and last on May 1) in the same format. However, it was cancelled on April 25 due to the financial payment debt issues between Vote Pilipinas (a group made by Impact Hub Manila, the debate's organizer and production) and Philippine Plaza Holdings (owner of Sofitel Philippine Plaza Manila, the debate's official venue), as well as the inevitable scheduling conflicts of the candidates.
- May 4 - UAAP Varsity Channel expanded its broadcast through online streaming via iWantTFC for international viewers with Cignal TV remained as the official broadcasting rights to the league and marked the return of University Athletic Association of the Philippines on ABS-CBN Corporation after two years following the lapsed of its broadcast franchise on July 10, 2020, that led the dissolution of ABS-CBN Sports on August 31, 2020.
- May 5 - iWantTFC and Red Bull GmbH signed a partnership to stream curated international premium contents from Red Bull featuring sporting matches and lifestyle events on the streaming service in the Philippines beginning on May 8.
- May 6 - IZTV has switched its airing of aspect ratio format quality on the channel feed and its programming to widescreen format (16:9) as being converted its mitigation of reception through digital signal reception through free TV and other cable and satellite providers after 30 years on the usage of broadcast video picture resolution that migrated from fullscreen format (4:3).
- May 9 - Aliw Broadcasting Corporation launched its own broadcasting network, IZTV.
- May 9–10 - All Philippine TV networks had its special coverage of the 2022 elections.
- May 12 - Star Magic celebrated its 30th anniversary of talent agency formation.
- May 12–23 - The 2021 Southeast Asian Games was held in Hanoi, Vietnam after six months of postponement due to the COVID-19 pandemic in Vietnam. MediaQuest Holdings (Cignal TV) and its sister company Smart Communications awarded the local rights to the annual games which aired on One Sports, One Sports+, Cignal Play and Smart Gigafest.
- May 13 – The UP Fighting Maroons wins the UAAP Season 84 men's basketball championship title after defeating Ateneo Blue Eagles 2–1 in a do-or-die three-game series. This was their 3rd men's basketball championship title since their last title in UAAP Season 49 in 1986.
- May 14 - Gabb Skribikin of Pasig and Rob Blackburn of Laguna were named as the Top 2 Finalist on the Teen Edition of Pinoy Big Brother: Kumunity Season 10.
- May 20 - Tadhana celebrated its 5th anniversary on Philippine television.
- May 22 - The Letran Knights claim the NCAA season 97 men's basketball tournament title after defeating the Mapúa Cardinals 2–0 in a best-of-three series.
- May 23
  - ABS-CBN, Kroma Entertainment and 917Ventures, in partnership with Broadcast Enterprises and Affiliated Media, launched a real-time multi-format, multi-platform and multi-screen tradigital interactive entertainment channel airing via BEAM TV's digital subchannel, cable and satellite, and online through YouTube, official website and GLife on GCash for May 28, Pinoy Interactive Entertainment (PIE) Channel.
  - Broadcast Enterprises and Affiliated Media has switched its airing of aspect ratio format quality on the channel feed and its programming to widescreen format (16:9) as being converted its mitigation of reception through digital signal reception through free TV and other cable and satellite providers after almost 29 years on the usage of broadcast video picture resolution that migrated from fullscreen format (4:3).
- May 29 - Singer Anji Salvacion from the Celebrity Edition was proclaimed as the winner of Pinoy Big Brother: Kumunity Season 10.

=== June ===
- June 1
  - TeleRadyo resumed its free-to-air broadcast through ZOE TV's digital subchannel after nearly two years of halt broadcast due to the Shutdown of ABS-CBN broadcasting in 2020. Alongside with its terrestrial return, the channel modified its on-air bug logo on May 16 with an incorporated ABS-CBN mark to reflected its branding identity.
  - Knowledge Channel transferred its digital subchannel assignment to Channel 31, where PIE Channel is among in the said broadcast frequency, from Channel 50 with BEAM TV remained as part of its digital frequency due the former frequency's poor signal reception. Meanwhile, four other BEAM TV's digital subchannels assigned on Channel 50 including BEAM TV (a standalone broadcasting network with DepEd TV as its main sole programming), Life TV, TV Shop Philippines, and a timeshare programming subchannel of Oras ng Himala Channel and Pilipinas HD, were remained with the same frequency until June 30 (excluding a sole programming subchannel of DepEd TV).
- June 4 - A&Q Entertainment, Prime Stream, Inc. and Sun Mobile Commerce launched a joint Filipino-Korean partner-owned hybrid streaming company with AQ Prime Entertainment as one of its offerings, AQ Prime Stream.
- June 10 - Lionsgate Play, a streaming service owned by Lionsgate India through its partner PLDT (under the brand PLDT Home), was launched and became available in the Philippines.
- June 11 - Mars Pa More (formerly known as Mars since 2019) celebrated its tenth anniversary on Philippine television until it concluded on July 1.
- June 16 - Cignal launched four channels on their line-up: Deutsche Welle, Kapamilya Channel HD, SPOTV and SPOTV2, as well as the returned channel, Fox News Channel.
- June 18 - Singer-songwriter Kris Lawrence (portrayed as "Panda") was proclaimed the grand winner of the second season of Masked Singer Pilipinas.
- June 20
  - G Sat terminated ETC on its line-up due to the network's rebranding on July 11. Meanwhile, the network continued to air via Channel 21 in Metro Manila, Cignal, SatLite, Sky Cable and Cablelink (until June 22 only) until it rebranded on July 11. In addition, G Sat launched SMNI on their line-up.
  - GMA Network, Inc. launched a livestreaming exclusive episodes for new and current shows of GMA on their digital and online platforms such as Facebook and YouTube, Kapuso Stream.
  - GMA Network, Inc. aired he first Tagalog-dubbed Malaysian drama on Philippine television, The Maid.
- June 21 – The NU Lady Bulldogs wins the UAAP Season 84 women's volleyball championship title after defeating the DLSU Lady Spikers 2–0 in a best-of-three series. This was their 3rd women's volleyball championship title since their last title after 65 years, and also the team to have a perfect 16-0 record, just like Ateneo did a perfect record in 2015.
- June 27 - Cinema One has switched its airing of aspect ratio format quality on the channel feed and its programming to high-definition (16:9) as converted its mitigation of reception through Sky Cable and other cable providers, iWantTFC, TFC IPTV, and other digital platforms after 28 years on the usage of broadcast video picture resolution that migrated from standard-definition (4:3).
- June 29 - Wish Ko Lang! celebrated its 20th anniversary on Philippine television.
- June 30 - After a year and eight months, DepEd TV has ceased its service operations on various channel listings via free-to-air and pay TV providers in preparation for the return of face-to-face classes. Meanwhile, DepEd TV NCR Prime, DepEd TV NCR Smart and DepEd TV ALS continued to air on digital free-to-air subchannels and pay TV providers.

=== July ===
- July 1 - TV5 celebrated its 60th anniversary of broadcasting as a television network.
- July 8 - Jungo TV, through its release partner Dito Telecommunity, launched a Filipino-dedicated streaming service for its owned and acquired content offerings, Jungo Pinoy.
- July 11
  - ABS-CBN Entertainment, Brightlight Productions, TV5 Network, Inc. and ZOE Broadcasting Network extended their collaboration to aired ABS-CBN and Brightlight produced noontime variety programs via A2Z, Kapamilya Channel and TV5 beginning July 16.
  - Solar Entertainment Corporation rebranded ETC into two channels: Scream Flix (through its partnership with Jungo TV, which is the Philippine version of a global TV network of the same name and used as a programming block of Hallypop since 2021, a horror-dedicated movie channel featuring its sub-genre films) and SolarFlix (through its subsidiary Southern Broadcasting Network, a Tagalog movie channel showcasing classic Filipino and indie films, shorts, and documentaries from local festivals, as well as general entertainment from ETC's current and existing programming), after nearly 19 years of broadcasting due to programming redundancies, lack of advertising support and cross-cutting measures.
- July 16
  - In colliding with its debut on TV5, ABS-CBN's noontime variety program It's Showtime resumed their live studio audience after two years on behind closed door productions resulted to the COVID-19 pandemic in 2020. Alongside its audience return, the program updated its new logo and opening theme, as well as refurbished studio on July 25.
  - Medrix Cunag ("Maja-kit-akit") of Pulilan, Bulacan, was hailed as the first grand winner of Eat Bulaga!'s Dancing Kween.
- July 18 - Sky Cable terminated Loveworld Asia on its line-up due to the network's pull-out from the satellite broadcast dish provider's line-up. Meanwhile, the network migrated through online.
- July 22 – The Benilde Lady Blazers wins the NCAA Season 97 women's volleyball championship title after defeating the Arellano Lady Chiefs 2–0 in a best-of-three series. This was their 2nd women's volleyball championship title since their last title in NCAA Season 91 in 2016.
- July 23 - Sam Coloso of Parañaque was hailed as first Showtime Sexy Babe grand winner on It's Showtime.
- July 26 - iWantTFC launched FashionTV on their live channel streaming line-up.
- July 31 - Solar Sports (owned by Solar Entertainment Corporation) has switched its airing of aspect ratio format quality on the channel feed and its programming to widescreen format (16:9) as being converted its mitigation of reception through Sky Cable and other cable providers and other digital platforms after more than 28 years on the usage of broadcast video picture resolution that migrated from fullscreen format (4:3).

=== August ===
- August 8
  - AQ Prime Entertainment launched an over-the-top streaming media service platform, AQ Prime.
  - GMA Network, Inc. launched a recapping exclusive episodes for old and well-loved shows of GMA on their YouTube channel, Stream Together.
  - The Tuesday Group was hailed as the Dance Entertainment Kids Group Grand Champion on Tropang LOL.
- August 10 - Syd delos Santos was hailed as the Ultimate Dance Champion on Tropang LOL's Dance Entertainment Kids.
- August 12 - After nearly seven years of its broadcast programming run, FPJ's Ang Probinsyano aired its series finale with a total of 1,696 episodes, making the longest-running primetime series on Philippine television.
- August 19 - ABS-CBN's Knowledge Channel launched "School Anywhere", a campaign program complementing the Department of Education's requirement of a hybrid learning curriculum on basic education which targeted teachers and students in supplementing both classroom and distance learning.

=== September ===
- September 1 - MTV Asia rebranded to MTV 90s across Southeast Asia due to the planned restructuring content of Paramount Networks EMEAA (a unit of Paramount International Networks owned by Paramount Global) as part of the upcoming launch of their own streaming service in the region.
- September 3 - Truth Channel celebrated its 5th anniversary of broadcasting.
- September 4 - The San Miguel Beermen claim the 2022 PBA Philippine Cup title after defeating TNT Tropang Giga 4–3 in a do-or-die seven-game series.
- September 5 - iWantTFC launched four Jungo TV channels on their live channel streaming line-up: A8 ESports, Black Belt TV, Scream Flix and Toro TV.
- September 6 - A minor fire broke out at the ABS-CBN Broadcasting Center in Quezon City, causing the temporary suspension of its operations inside the building, resulted to the halt broadcast interruptions of ABS-CBN News Channel and TeleRadyo, which immediately resumed afterwards.
- September 7 - Nine Media Corporation (CNN Philippines) and Villar Group's Prime Asset Ventures, Inc. (Streamtech through Planet Cable's Advanced Media Broadcasting System) entered a content license partnership to simultaneously aired the former's primetime newscast on AMBS' upcoming broadcast network beginning on September 13.
- September 13 - Advanced Media Broadcasting System initially or softly launched its own broadcasting network, All TV. Alongside its launch, Villar Group's Prime Asset Ventures, Inc. (Streamtech through Planet Cable's Advanced Media Broadcasting System) and Globe Telecom's Group Retirement Fund (Bethlehem Holdings, Inc. through Broadcast Enterprises and Affiliated Media) signed an agreement to broadcast the said channel through BEAM TV's digital subchannel assignment as part of their nationwide expansion.
- September 18 - Khimo Gumatay of Makati was hailed as the grand winner of the second season of Idol Philippines.

=== October ===
- October 1
  - All pay television operators and providers in the Philippines have added or terminated a number of various channels and networks on their respective listing line-ups.
  - After almost eight years of broadcasting in the Philippines, H2 has ceased its operations by A&E Networks across Southeast Asia due to the review of the management's decision through changes in business direction.
  - Cablelink terminated Travelxp on its line-up due to the review of the network's subscription performance.
  - Tap Go made its official relaunch with the addition of new, FAST channels such as Laff, Crime TV, Comic U, and Game Show Central.
- October 6 - ABS-CBN Corporation and Warner Bros. Discovery (through its Asia-Pacific division) sealed a content distribution deal to air Metro Channel's lifestyle programs in Central and Southeast Asia on international cable channels via Asian Food Network and Discovery Asia, as well as Discovery+ for on-demand.
- October 11 - Cignal TV, in partnership with University of the Philippines, launched a university-dedicated educational channel, TVUP.
- October 12 - Precious Paula Nicole of Camarines Norte was hailed as the grand winner of the first season of Drag Race Philippines.
- October 14 - Sky Cable terminated RT on its line-up due to the network's unavailability on the said provider and amid the Russian invasion of Ukraine since March. Meanwhile, the network continued to air via Cablelink and other pay television providers.
- October 16 - GMA News and Public Affairs officially renamed its news subdivision (GMA News) to GMA Integrated News, which added the Integrated word to its former name, synergized into an integrated news division joint with GMA Regional TV and GMA News Online.
- October 22
  - Anne Patricia Lorenzo of Manila was hailed as third Ms. Q and A: Kweens of the Multibeks 2022 grand winner on It's Showtime.
  - Jeepney TV celebrated its tenth anniversary of broadcasting on pay television.
- October 24 - Wil TV Network (owned by celebrity businessman Willie Revillame) launched its own digital community service platform, Flex TV.
- October 26 - After a year and a month, Philippine Collective Media Corporation and ZOE Broadcasting Network announced a termination of its affiliation agreement for broadcasting A2Z on PRTV's owned Channel 12.
- October 30 - Solar Sports celebrated its 20th anniversary of broadcasting on cable and satellite television.

=== November ===
- November 1 - ZOE Broadcasting Network terminated TeleRadyo on ZOE TV's digital subchannel line-up via Channel 20 due to the expiration of its licensing agreement with the network. Meanwhile, the network continued to air via Sky Cable and other cable and satellite providers, as well as through online via ABS-CBN News' social media platforms, official website and mobile application (including iWantTFC). In addition, ZOE Broadcasting Network launched Light TV on the same digital assignment frequency slot in Metro Manila (whereas the aforementioned network is currently broadcast in other regional areas since January), with Channel 33 carrying the same channel remained on-air.
- November 3 - Setanta Sports, a global sports broadcasting brand, was launched both as a linear channel and as an OTT service in the Philippines. This comes after a joint partnership between Setanta founders and owner Adjara Group bought the exclusive broadcasting rights of the Premier League for the said country, after its previous broadcast partner TAP DMV's contract with the said league was expired.
- November 15 - GMA News and Public Affairs were officially split into two separate divisions: GMA Integrated News and GMA Public Affairs. The latter retained Nessa Valdellon as the division's First Vice President (FVP). Both Valdellon and Oliver Victor Amoroso succeeded Marissa Flores (who retired as SVP of GMA News and Public Affairs last June and ended her consultancy last October) under their respective positions.
- November 17 - Disney+, a streaming service owned by Disney Streaming under Disney Media and Entertainment Distribution (a division of The Walt Disney Company) through its telecommunications partner Globe Telecom (including a joint-ventured with Alipay for GCash via Alipay+), was launched and became available in the Philippines.
- November 18 - Sky Cable launched IZTV on their line-up, as well as the returned channel, Golden Nation Network (formerly Global News Network at the time of the channel's termination on the said provider).
- November 19 – Team Jhong and Ryan was hailed as the thirteenth anniversary grand champion (Magpasikat 2022: TRESElebrate) on It's Showtime.
- November 20–December 19 - The 2022 FIFA World Cup was recently held in Qatar. TAP Digital Media Ventures Corporation thru its World Cup TV pay-per-view service awarded the local rights to the annual games which aired on TAP Sports, Premier Sports, Premier Football and TAP Go TV, as well as separate pay-per-view via Cignal, G Sat, Sky Cable, Cablelink, various provincial providers (Air Cable, Asian Vision, Planet Cable and Parasat), and selected commercial establishments.
- November 28 - Born to Be Wild celebrated its 15th anniversary on Philippine television.
- November 30 - After 8 years, WWE Network has ceased its subscription video on-demand over-the-top streaming service for the Philippines by the professional wrestling promotion WWE, a division of TKO Group Holdings, as the latter and its content (including archives and "Premium Live Events") were transferred to Disney+ Philippines (13 days prior to the WWE Network closure).

=== December ===
- December 2 - Magpakailanman celebrated its 20th anniversary on Philippine television.
- December 3 - Emil Malaborbor was hailed as the first Ultimate Bida-O-Kid Star grand winner of Sing Galing Kids.
- December 10
  - Carmela Lorzano of Batangas was hailed as the Ultimate Bida-Oke Star grand winner of the second season of Sing Galing!.
  - After 31 years and seven months of its broadcast programming run, Maalaala Mo Kaya aired the final episode of its first iteration with a total of 30 seasons, making the longest-running drama anthology on Philippine television.
  - Brgy. Guadalupe, Cebu City (Don Juan) was hailed as Eat Bulaga!'s Sayaw Barangay 2022 grand winner.
- December 12 - Rock Entertainment Holdings replaced Rock Extreme with Rock Action.
- December 15 - KBS Korea, an overseas pay channel service owned by Korean Broadcasting System was launched in the Philippines through Sky Cable.
- December 18 – The Letran Knights wins the NCAA Season 98 men's basketball championship title after defeating the Benilde Blazers 2–1 in a do-or-die three-game series. This was their third consecutive championship title.
- December 19 – The Ateneo Blue Eagles wins the UAAP Season 85 men's basketball championship title after defeating UP Fighting Maroons 2–1 in a do-or-die three-game series. This was their 12th men's basketball championship title since their last title in UAAP Season 82 in 2019.

=== Cancelled ===
- April 30 - GMA Network originally slated to organize their presidential debates, "Debate 2022: The GMA Presidential Face-off" but silently cancelled for unknown reasons.
- August 10 - Lopez Holdings Corporation (ABS-CBN Corporation) and PLDT's Beneficial Trust Fund (MediaQuest Holdings) originally signed a joint venture convertible note partnership wherein a press release announcement on August 11 for the reach landmark deal with a controlling shares in percentage stake of ABS-CBN's investment agreement by 34.99% acquisition to TV5 Network, Inc. as well as Cignal TV's sale and purchase agreement by 38.88% investment to Sky Cable Corporation. On August 24, both media entities temporary suspended the closing preparations of its investment deal to give their address for the companies' collaboration agreement space following the raising concerned issues from the Congress of the Philippines, National Telecommunications Commission and other government regulatory agencies. On September 1, ABS-CBN Corporation, Cignal Cable Corporation, López, Inc., Sky Vision Corporation and TV5 Network, Inc. have mutually agreed the termination of their investment deal through formalization for its memorandum of agreement in disclosures to the Philippine Stock Exchange and the Securities and Exchange Commission citing the parties confirmed of no implementation on any of the transactions.
- December 23 - Cignal and SatLite has supposed to terminate Rock Extreme on its line-up due to the review of the management's decision through restructuring content and rebranding of the said network to Rock Action since December 12. However, they discontinued the termination of the said channel on its satellite TV services.

== Debuts ==
=== Major networks ===
==== A2Z ====
The following are programs that debuted on A2Z:

- January 1: TV Patrol Weekend
- January 3: Afternoon Zinema (A2Z Zinema) and TV Patrol
- January 15: I Can See Your Voice (season 4)
- January 24: The Broken Marriage Vow
- February 8: Word for the Season
- February 9: Prayerline
- February 11: Worship, Word and Wonders
- February 17: AgriKids (School at Home)
- March 19: My Papa Pi (season 1)
- April 10: KBYN: Kaagapay ng Bayan
- April 23: Parent Experiment (YeY Famtime)
- April 24: He's Into Her (season 2)
- May 16: 2 Good 2 Be True (2G2BT)
- May 30: Love in 40 Days
- June 4: Pinoy Big Brother: Kumunity Season 10 Big Homecoming
- June 20: News Patrol
- June 25: Flower of Evil and Idol Philippines (season 2)
- June 27: A Family Affair
- July 16: Naruto: Shippuden (season 10) (Kidz Weekend), and Tropang LOL
- August 15: Mars Ravelo's Darna (2022)
- August 21: Bola Bola
- September 11: Run to Me
- September 24: Everybody, Sing! (season 2)
- September 25: Mang Lalakbay (Kidz Weekend)
- October 9: Lyric and Beat
- October 10: Hero City Kids Force
- October 15: Hoy, Love You Two
- October 31: Ever Night: War of Brilliant Splendours
- November 5: Hoy, Love You 3
- November 14: The Iron Heart
- November 19: Dream Maker
- December 4: Click, Like, Share (season 3)

===== Re-runs =====
- February 5: Care Bears: Unlock the Magic (Kidz Weekend)^{4} and PJ Masks (Kidz Weekend)^{4}
- February 7: Touch Your Heart^{1}
- February 21: Be My Lady^{1}
- March 28: Init sa Magdamag
- April 2: Oddbods (seasons 1 and 2; Kidz Weekend)^{3}^{4}^{5}
- April 17: Lego Ninjago (seasons 1 and 2; Kidz Weekend)^{4}
- April 18: Meow: The Secret Boy
- May 30: Code Name: Terrius^{1}
- July 2: Pororo the Little Penguin (season 5; Kidz Weekend)^{4}
- July 16: Mr. Bean: The Animated Series (Kidz Weekend)^{1}^{3}^{4}^{6}
- July 18: Be Careful with My Heart^{1}
- August 7: Charlotte (Kidz Weekend)^{1}^{2}^{4}
- August 22: Pop Babies (School Anywhere)^{4}
- August 29: Bagani^{1}
- November 7: Flower of Evil
- November 28: Ang sa Iyo ay Akin

Notes
^ ^{a} Originally aired on ABS-CBN (now Kapamilya Channel)
^ ^{b} Originally aired on GMA
^ ^{c} Originally aired on TV5
^ ^{d} Originally aired on Yey! (now defunct)
^ ^{e} Originally aired on Kapamilya Channel
^ ^{f} Originally aired on Studio 23 (now IZTV)

==== GMA ====
The following are programs that debuted on GMA Network:

- January 3: Mano Po Legacy: The Family Fortune and My Husband-in-Law
- January 7: Eat Well, Live Well, Stay Well (season 3)
- January 10: I Can See You: AlterNate and Little Princess
- January 24: Bad Genius and Prima Donnas (season 2)
- January 29: Agimat ng Agila (season 2)
- February 7: The Penthouse (season 3)
- February 14: Balitang Southern Tagalog (GMA Batangas), Dapat Alam Mo!, Douluo Continent and First Lady
- February 20: The Best Ka!
- February 28: Backstreet Rookie and Widows' Web
- March 7: Artikulo 247
- March 14: Mano Po Legacy: Her Big Boss
- March 21: Family Feud (4th incarnation)
- March 27: Beyond Today
- April 4: One the Woman
- April 18: The Herbal Master
- April 24: Raya Sirena
- April 25: Raising Mamay
- April 30: Ultraman Taiga
- May 2: Apoy sa Langit and False Positive
- May 9: Man of Vengeance
- May 14: Jose & Maria's Bonggang Villa
- May 30: Bolera and The Witch's Diner
- June 6: Love You Stranger, The Fake Life and The Skywatcher
- June 11: Pepito Manaloto: Tuloy ang Kuwento
- June 20: Show Window: The Queen's House and The Maid
- July 4: Lolong (season 1) and Prophecy of Love
- July 11: Miss the Dragon and My Forever Sunshine
- July 24: Ultraman Z
- July 25: TiktoClock
- August 1: Return to Paradise
- August 15: About Time and The Red Sleeve
- August 28: The Wall Philippines (season 2)
- August 29: One Night Steal, To Me, It's Simply You and What We Could Be
- September 3: Running Man Philippines
- September 4: Meteo Heroes
- September 5: Abot-Kamay na Pangarap and One North Central Luzon (GMA Dagupan and GMA Ilocos)
- September 26: Nakarehas na Puso and Start-Up PH
- October 3: Maria Clara at Ibarra
- October 10: Ghost Doctor and The Wolf
- October 14: Eat Well, Live Well, Stay Well (season 4)
- October 30: Home Base Plus (season 23)
- October 31: Mano Po Legacy: The Flower Sisters, Put Your Head on My Shoulder and The New Legends of Monkey
- November 7: My Shy Boss and Unica Hija
- November 28: Ancient Love Poetry
- December 5: Another Miss Oh

===== Re-runs =====
- January 10: Dragon Ball Z^{5}
- January 24: Queen and I
- February 14: Princess Hours^{1}^{3}^{4}
- March 21: I Hear Your Voice
- April 25: Gokusen (season 1)^{7}
- June 13: The Worst Witch (season 3)
- July 23: Martin Mystery
- July 25: Daimos (2017 dub reboot)
- September 3: Oggy and the Cockroaches^{2}
- September 19: Goblin^{1}^{6}
- September 26: Gokusen (season 2)^{7}
- October 22: Ultraman R/B
- November 28: Flame of Recca
- December 19: What's Wrong with Secretary Kim^{1}^{6}
- December 26: Agimat ng Agila (season 1)

Notes
^ ^{a} Originally aired on ABS-CBN (now Kapamilya Channel)
^ ^{b} Originally aired on TV5
^ ^{c} Originally aired on Jeepney TV
^ ^{d} Originally aired on Studio 23 (now IZTV)
^ ^{e} Originally aired on RPN (now CNN Philippines)
^ ^{f} Originally aired on Asianovela Channel (now defunct)
^ ^{g} Originally aired on TeleAsia Channel (now defunct)

==== TV5 ====
The following are programs that debuted on TV5:

- January 12: Cine Cinco Hollywood Edition
- January 24: Remember: War of the Son and The Broken Marriage Vow
- March 13: The Chiefs
- March 19: Masked Singer Pilipinas season 2
- March 21: La suerte de Loli and Sing Galing! (2nd incarnation; season 2)
- March 27: FPJ: Da King
- April 18: Lakwatsika
- May 16: 2 Good 2 Be True (2G2BT)
- May 23: Dear God (season 1)
- May 28: Rolling In It Philippines (season 2)
- May 30: Love in 40 Days
- June 18: Mga Kwentong Epik, Sine Todo: Family Hollywood and Top Class
- June 19: Kusina ni Mamang
- June 25: Idol Philippines season 2
- June 27: A Family Affair
- July 10: Shootaround
- July 16: It's Showtime and Sing Galing Kids
- July 18: BalitaOnenan! (season 1) and Suntok sa Buwan
- August 6: Oh My Korona
- August 15: Mars Ravelo's Darna (2022)
- August 22: Sin vergüenza
- September 24: Everybody, Sing! season 2
- September 27: Moonbug Cartoons
  - September 27: Cocomelon, Go Buster and Little Baby Bum
- October 1: Kalye Kweens
- October 15: Cine Classico
- October 31: Ever Night: War of Brilliant Splendours
- November 14: The Iron Heart
- December 3: Tik Talks
- December 17: The Brilliant Life
- December 31: Regal Movies

===== Re-runs =====
- January 10: Marimar (1994)^{2}^{4}^{5}^{9}
- January 16: Lokomoko (Happy Naman D'yan!), Lokomoko U (Happy Naman D'yan!), Tropa Mo Ko Unli (Happy Naman D'yan!) and Wow Mali Pa Rin! (Happy Naman D'yan!)
- February 5: Krypton^{9}
- February 7: Touch Your Heart^{1}
- February 26: DC's Legends of Tomorrow season 2
- March 12: Samurai Jack^{5}
- April 18: Camp Lazlo^{4}^{5}, Enchanted Garden (Throwback Favorites Presents), Foster's Home for Imaginary Friends^{4}^{5}, Meow: The Secret Boy^{6}^{8} and Uncle Grandpa^{7}
- May 8: Designated Survivor^{9}
- May 30: María la del Barrio (1995)^{1}^{9}
- July 16: Puto (2021 television remake)
- July 18: Dragons: Race to the Edge, Lokomoko (Happy Naman D'yan!), Lokomoko U (Happy Naman D'yan!), My Hero Academia (seasons 1 and 2)^{3}, Trolls: The Beat Goes On!, Tropa Mo Ko Unli (Happy Naman D'yan!) and Wow Mali Pa Rin! (Happy Naman D'yan!)
- October 17: Ang Panday (2016)
- November 7: Flower of Evil^{6}^{8}
- December 17: Top 20 Funniest^{2}
- December 26: Encounter (Philippine adaptation)

Notes
^ ^{a} Originally aired on ABS-CBN (now Kapamilya Channel)
^ ^{b} Originally aired on GMA
^ ^{c} Originally aired on Yey!
^ ^{d} Originally aired on Q (now GTV)
^ ^{e} Originally aired on RPN (now CNN Philippines)
^ ^{f} Originally aired on Kapamilya Channel
^ ^{g} Originally aired on CNN Philippines
^ ^{h} Originally aired on A2Z
^ ^{i} Originally aired on One Screen (now defunct)

=== State-owned networks ===
==== PTV ====
The following are programs that debuted on People's Television Network:

- January 22: Entrepinas TV
- February 12: One DA sa TV
- March 4: i-ARTA Na 'Yan!
- March 17: The Chatroom
- April 4: Know Your Candidates
- April 10: Paliwanag: The 2022 Election Townhall Series
- June 19: Pet Pals TV (season 2)
- August 20: PTV Sports Weekend
- September 5: Mike Abe Live
- September 24: KooPinoy: ACDI MPC'S Cooperative TV

==== IBC ====
The following are programs that debuted on IBC:

- February 27: Bet to Serve
- July 11: Padayon: The NCCA Hour
- August 29: PTV Sports (2nd incarnation), Rise and Shine Pilipinas and Sentro Balita
- September 3: Ulat Bayan Weekend
- September 25: Agri TV Atbp.: Kasama sa Hanapbuhay and Shakey's Super League
- October 8: Dokyubata TV
- October 31: IBC Express Balita (2nd incarnation)

=== Minor networks ===
The following are programs that debuted on minor networks:

- January 9: Quizon CT (Comedy Theater) on Net 25
- January 24: Ano Sa Palagay N'yo?: Primetime on Net 25
- February 28: EZ Shop on Net 25
- March 7: Kristiano Drama on UNTV
- March 21: Mi Esperanza, Never Twice, Palabra de Amor and Panalo o Talo, It's You! on Net 25
- March 26: Bida Kayo Kay Aga on Net 25
- April 4: Mata ng Agila International on Net 25
- April 9: Oh No, Its B.O.! (Biro Only) on Net 25
- May 10: Balita at Talakayan, Balitaan at Kumustahan sa IZ, Balitang Todo Lakas, Buhay Metro, Dear Ate Juday, IZ Balita Nationwide sa Umaga, IZ Balita Nationwide sa Hapon, In the Heart of Business, Karambola, O.R.O. (Obserbasyon, Reaksiyon at Opinyon) sa DWIZ, Musika at Balitaan, Pangga Ruth Abao Live, Radyo Klinika, Ratsada sa Umaga, Serbisyong Lubos sa Otso Otso Dos, StorIZ of Love, Sulong na, Bayan, Tambayan sa DWIZ, Teka-Teka... Si Señor Rey Pacheco Na!, Trending Ngayon and Yes, Yes Yo, Topacio! on IZTV
- May 11: Pilipinas Ngayon Na and Serbisyong Bayan ni Tatay Rannie on IZTV
- May 13: Up-Up Pilipinas on IZTV
- May 14: Balitang Paliparan, Beyond Wellness with Ms. P, Biyahe ni David Oro, Brgy. 882, El Pueblo Publico, Echoes of the Heart, Isyu ng Bayan, IZ Balita Nationwide Sabado, Mag-Usap Tayo, Mr. Taxman, Labanan Para sa Karapatan, Obet P sa IZ, Pulis @ Ur Serbis, Usapang Senado, Sa Kabukiran at Kabuhayan and Sapol ni Jarius Bondoc on IZTV
- May 15: Ano’ng Say ni Father, Ano’ng Say nina Brothers?, Bella Filipina, Gawin ang Tama, IZ Balita Nationwide Linggo, Manila Cathedral Mass, OPM sa DWIZ, Pasiklaban sa DWIZ, Senior Citizens’ Forum, Showbiz sa IZ, Todong Nationwide Talakayan and Usapang Payaman! on IZTV
- May 16: SCWC Konek on IZTV
- June 1: Shuffle: Honoring God Through Music on Light TV
- June 5: Miffy's Adventures Big and Small on Net 25
- June 6: Señor Balita on IZTV
- June 11: Lutong Daza on Net 25
- June 12: Transformers: Rescue Bots on Net 25
- June 27: A Place in the Sun on Net 25
- July 3: Sine Throwback on Net 25
- July 18: Fatal Promise on Net 25
- August 8: Shopping All the Way with Jojo A. on Net 25
- August 31: Counterpoint (3rd incarnation) on Net 25
- September 4: Love, Bosleng & Tali! on Net 25
- September 13: InstaJam, K-Lite 103.5 FM, News Night, River Where the Moon Rises, Toni Talks and Wowowin on All TV
- September 17: All Flix on All TV
- October 1: Ano'ng Meron kay Abok? on Net 25
- October 2: Korina Interviews on Net 25
- October 3: Toni on All TV
- October 3: Two Sisters on Net 25
- October 16: Tara Game, Agad Agad! Level Up on Net 25
- October 24: Again My Life on All TV
- November 3: IZ Balita Nationwide sa Tanghali on IZTV
- November 21: Kingdom Force on SMNI
- November 26: AllFlix Sabado Hits, EZ Shop, Island Living and Kuha All! on All TV
- November 27: AllFlix Linggo Hits on All TV
- November 28: AllFlix Noon Fix, From Now On, Showtime! and M.O.M.s: Mhies on a Mission on All TV
- December 4: The Financial District on IZTV
- December 5: Rekta Kay Atty. Belgica on Light TV
- December 12: Daydreamer on Net 25

==== Re-runs ====
- September 14: Doble Kara and Ngayon at Kailanman (2018) on All TV^{1}^{2}
- September 26: Sana Dalawa ang Puso on All TV^{1}^{2}
- Notes
1. ^ ^{a} Originally aired on ABS-CBN (now Kapamilya Channel)
2. ^ ^{b} Originally aired on Jeepney TV

=== Other channels ===
The following are programs that debuted on other channels:

- January 3: The Dark Widow and The Two Lives of Estela Carrillo on Telenovela Channel
- January 8: Discover Eats, From Helen's Kitchen and MomBiz on One PH
- January 10: I Can See You: AlterNate on GTV
- January 14: Celebrity Obsessed on TAP TV
- January 15: I Can See Your Voice season 4 on Kapamilya Channel
- January 15: At Your Home on One PH
- January 15: Britannia (season 2) on TAP Action Movies
- January 16: West of Liberty on TAP Edge
- January 23: I Heart PH (season 4) on CNN Philippines
- January 23: The Key of David on GTV
- January 24: The Broken Marriage Vow on Jeepney TV and Kapamilya Channel
- January 31: The Kelly Clarkson Show season 3 on TAP TV
- February 2: The Equalizer (2021, season 1) on TAP Edge
- February 3: Noughts + Crosses on TAP Edge
- February 5: Young Rock on TAP TV
- February 6: Proyekto Pilipino on Jeepney TV
- February 6: Sunday Kapamilya Blockbusters on Kapamilya Channel
- February 7: Mano Po Legacy: The Family Fortune on GTV
- February 14: First Lady on GTV
- February 21: Girl Next Room on GTV
- February 21: Good Girls (season 1) on TAP Edge
- February 24: The Sinner (season 3) on TAP Edge
- February 28: Widows' Web on GTV
- March 6: The Handmaid's Tale (season 2) on TAP Movies
- March 7: #MaineGoals on BuKo Channel
- March 7: Doctor John on GTV
- March 7: Corazón Salvaje and Road to Destiny on Telenovela Channel
- March 14: Princess Weiyoung on Heart of Asia
- March 19: My Papa Pi (season 1) on Kapamilya Channel
- March 21: BalitaOnenan! (season 1) on BuKo Channel
- March 21: Julius and Tintin: Para sa Pamilyang Pilipino on One PH
- March 25: Jay Leno's Garage (season 3) on TAP Sports
- March 27: Ride Tribe on CNN Philippines
- April 2: Dobol Weng sa Dobol B (Dobol B TV) on GTV
- April 9: Hotseat on One Sports
- April 10: KBYN: Kaagapay ng Bayan on Kapamilya Channel and TeleRadyo
- April 17: AgriKids on Kapamilya Channel
- April 18: Suits on TAP Edge
- April 18: My Sweet Curse on Telenovela Channel
- April 19: New Amsterdam (2018, season 1) on TAP Edge
- April 22: Ordinary Joe and The Girl in the Woods on TAP Edge
- April 23: Parent Experiment (YeY FamTime) on Jeepney TV and Kapamilya Channel
- April 24: I Heart PH (season 5) on CNN Philippines
- April 24: He's Into Her (season 2) on Kapamilya Channel
- April 30: Business Matters (season 8) on CNN Philippines
- May 2: False Positive on GTV
- May 2: A Beloved Man on Telenovela Channel
- May 7: One Balita Weekend on One News and One PH
- May 10: Me Always You on GTV
- May 15: Chinese by Blood, Filipino by Heart (season 2) on CNN Philippines
- May 16: 2 Good 2 Be True (2G2BT) on Jeepney TV and Kapamilya Channel
- May 17: Fargo on TAP Edge
- May 21: Art of the Spirit on Heart of Asia
- May 23: Almusal All G, Barangayan, Bida Body Part, Ekstra Ordinaryo, Gscovery, Life Guro, Moments, Oohlat, Palong Follow, Playlist, Playlist Natin, Pera o Bayong (PoB), Sumpungan, Swerteng Sulpot Jr., Team Slapsoil and UZI on PIE Channel
- May 28: Dr. Cares on PIE Channel
- May 29: Lokal, Oohlascope, Oohlat Weather and Swerteng Sulpot on PIE Channel
- May 29: Rolling In It Philippines (season 2) on Sari-Sari Channel
- May 30: Bolera on GTV
- May 30: Love in 40 Days on Jeepney TV and Kapamilya Channel
- June 4: Pinoy Big Brother: Kumunity Season 10 Big Homecoming on Kapamilya Channel
- June 19: The Box on TAP Edge
- June 25: TOLS on GTV
- June 25: Flower of Evil on Jeepney TV
- June 25: Flower of Evil and Idol Philippines season 2 on Kapamilya Channel
- June 26: Mind S-Cool (season 4) on One PH
- June 27: Behind Your Smile on GTV
- June 27: A Family Affair on Jeepney TV and Kapamilya Channel
- July 1: Island Living on Viva Cinema
- July 2: Lakas ng Siyensya on TeleRadyo
- July 4: Lolong (season 1) on GTV
- July 11: Late Night Delight, My Sweet Lie (ETCerye) and Pinoy Mega Hits on SolarFlix
- July 11: Action After Dark on Solar Sports
- July 12: Sine Siesta on SolarFlix
- July 15: Jay Leno's Garage (season 4) on TAP Sports
- July 16: Travel with Kach on Jeepney TV
- July 16: Tropang LOL on Kapamilya Channel
- July 16: Buhay Barangay on Radyo Bandido TV
- July 16: Reeltime and Weekend Sine Nights on SolarFlix
- July 17: Silver Screen on CNN Philippines
- July 31: The Final Pitch (season 8) on CNN Philippines
- August 1: Balansyado on DZRH TV
- August 8: K-Pop Rewind on Hallypop
- August 8: EZ Shop on SolarFlix
- August 15: Mars Ravelo's Darna (2022) on Cine Mo! and Kapamilya Channel
- August 20: From the Heart Specials: Like a Fairytale on Heart of Asia
- August 21: Bola Bola on Kapamilya Channel
- August 27: Business Matters (season 9) on CNN Philippines
- August 29: Nabi, My Stepdarling and What We Could Be on GTV
- September 1: Viva Movie Classics on GTV
- September 4: The Bold Type (season 3) on TAP TV
- September 5: Wild Lands on Telenovela Channel
- September 10: Myx Hits Different on Myx
- September 11: Delayed Justice on GTV
- September 11: Run to Me on Kapamilya Channel
- September 11: The Little Drummer Girl on TAP Edge
- September 12: Dagdag Bawas, Eto Na Nga!, Matching Matching and Sumpungan HQ on PIE Channel
- September 12: Love to Death on Telenovela Channel
- September 17: The Chosen One on PIE Channel
- September 18: ONE Warrior Series: Philippines on GTV
- September 18: Pak! Palong Follow, Pasok mga Suki!, PIE Night Long Sessions and Sino'ng Manok Mo? on PIE Channel
- September 19: Balitanghali on Heart of Asia and I Heart Movies
- September 19: Moon Daughters on Telenovela Channel
- September 22: Myx Live! on Myx
- September 24: Fear Times on GTV
- September 24: Everybody, Sing! season 2 on Kapamilya Channel
- September 25: Mang Lalakbay on Kapamilya Channel
- September 25: Shakey's Super League on Solar Sports
- September 26: Start-Up PH on GTV
- October 1: Woman in Action on One News
- October 2: Hallypop Fresh on Hallypop
- October 2: Woman in Action on One PH
- October 2: Kalye Kweens on Sari-Sari Channel
- October 3: Maria Clara at Ibarra on GTV
- October 3: Radyo Bandido Balita on Radyo Bandido TV
- October 4: Hallypop Hits on Hallypop
- October 6: Hallypop Lokal on Hallypop
- October 9: Lyric and Beat on Kapamilya Channel
- October 10: Hero City Kids Force on Kapamilya Channel
- October 10: Touching You (ETCerye) on SolarFlix
- October 10: Italian Bride on Telenovela Channel
- October 13: Monkey and Dog Romance (ETCerye) on SolarFlix
- October 15: CNN Philippines 10 on CNN Philippines
- October 15: Hoy, Love You Two on Kapamilya Channel
- October 16: I Heart PH (season 6) on CNN Philippines
- October 16: Pusong Pinoy sa Amerika (season 17) on GTV
- October 16: All-Out Sundays on Heart of Asia and I Heart Movies
- October 18: Bubble Up (ETCerye) on SolarFlix
- October 23: Philippine Realty TV (season 20) on CNN Philippines
- October 29: The Formula on Heart of Asia
- October 31: Ever Night: War of Brilliant Splendours on Jeepney TV and Kapamilya Channel
- November 5: Hoy, Love You 3 on Kapamilya Channel
- November 6: V-League on CNN Philippines
- November 6: One For All, All For One! on INC TV
- November 7: The Merciless Judge on GTV
- November 13: The Word Exposed on SolarFlix
- November 14: Beauty Boy on GTV
- November 14: The Iron Heart on Jeepney TV and Kapamilya Channel
- November 19: Dream Maker on Kapamilya Channel
- November 19: NegoSHEnte on TeleRadyo
- November 26: Boy For Rent on GTV
- November 27: All-Out Sundays on GTV
- December 3: Tik Talks on One PH
- December 4: Rainbow Prince on Heart of Asia
- December 4: Click, Like, Share (season 3) on Kapamilya Channel
- December 4: Tik Talks on One News
- December 5: Tuloy Po Kayo on One News and One PH
- December 26: Hogu's Love and Mano Po Legacy: The Flower Sisters on GTV

==== Re-runs ====
- January 2: Mako Mermaids and The Bureau of Magical Things (season 1) on GTV^{2}
- January 3: Rhodora X on Heart of Asia^{2}^{18}
- January 3: Dahil sa Pag-ibig (2012) on Jeepney TV^{1}
- January 3: Something in the Rain on Kapamilya Channel^{21}
- January 9: Super Laff-In (1996) on Cine Mo!^{1}
- January 9: Angry Birds Stella on GTV^{2}
- January 9: Annaliza on Jeepney TV^{1}
- January 9: Usapang Real Life on One PH^{3}^{31}
- January 10: Moon Embracing the Sun on GTV^{2}
- January 10: The Penthouse (season 1) on Heart of Asia^{2}
- January 17: Pure Intention and The Love Knot on Heart of Asia^{26}
- January 17: Adventures of Sonic the Hedgehog on Jeepney TV^{5}
- January 29: Dok Ricky, Pedia on Kapamilya Channel^{1}
- January 31: The Borrowed Wife on Heart of Asia^{2}
- January 31: Mirabella on Jeepney TV^{1}
- January 31: Hyde Jekyll, Me on Kapamilya Channel^{4}^{8}^{21}
- February 5: Adventures of Sonic the Hedgehog on Kapamilya Channel^{5}
- February 5: Brooklyn Nine-Nine on TAP TV^{12}
- February 6: Komiks Presents: Wakasan on Jeepney TV^{1}
- February 7: Okay Ka, Fairy Ko! on BuKo Channel^{1}^{2}^{27}
- February 7: The Desire on Heart of Asia^{2}
- February 7: Ina, Kapatid, Anak and Touch Your Heart on Jeepney TV^{1}
- February 7: Touch Your Heart on Kapamilya Channel^{1}
- February 14: Two Spirits' Love on Heart of Asia^{26}
- February 14: Kahit Isang Saglit on Jeepney TV^{1}
- February 21: Prince of Wolf on Heart of Asia^{26}
- February 21: Be My Lady on Kapamilya Channel^{1}
- February 26: Robocar Poli on Jeepney TV^{5}^{19}
- February 27: Hunter × Hunter (season 2; 2011) on GTV^{2}
- February 28: Lovers in Paris and Maging Sino Ka Man (2006) on Jeepney TV^{1}
- March 7: Scarlet Heart on Heart of Asia^{2}^{26}
- March 7: Kokey on Jeepney TV^{1}
- March 14: Lie After Lie on Heart of Asia^{2}
- March 14: Hiram na Mukha on Jeepney TV^{1}
- March 14: Mama Fairy and the Woodcutter on Kapamilya Channel^{21}
- March 16: Ghost Fighter on GTV^{2}^{27}
- March 19: The Last Empress on Heart of Asia^{2}
- March 21: Huwag Ka Lang Mawawala on Jeepney TV^{1}
- March 26: Honesto and Precious Hearts Romances Presents: Midnight Phantom on Jeepney TV^{1}
- March 27: Budoy on Jeepney TV^{1}
- March 28: Init sa Magdamag on Kapamilya Channel
- April 2: La Doña on Heart of Asia^{26}
- April 2: Ang Munting Paraiso on Jeepney TV^{1}
- April 4: God of Lost Fantasy and My Love from Another Star on Heart of Asia^{2}
- April 4: The Wedding on Jeepney TV^{1}
- April 11: Oh My Baby on Heart of Asia^{2}
- April 11: Sana Maulit Muli on Jeepney TV^{1}
- April 11: Hwayugi: A Korean Odyssey on Kapamilya Channel^{1}^{21}
- April 17: When Duty Calls on Heart of Asia^{26}
- April 18: Dwarfina on Heart of Asia^{2}^{18}
- April 18: Johnny Test (season 4)^{5} and Meow: The Secret Boy^{19}^{25} on Jeepney TV
- April 18: Meow: The Secret Boy on Kapamilya Channel
- April 18: Noli Me Tangere on Knowledge Channel^{27}^{28}
- April 25: Emperor: Ruler of the Mask on Heart of Asia^{2}
- April 25: Palimos ng Pag-ibig and Sana Bukas pa ang Kahapon on Jeepney TV^{1}
- May 2: Endless Love (season 2; ETCerye Rewind) on ETC (now SolarFlix)
- May 2: Legend of the Blue Sea on GTV^{1}^{21}
- May 2: The Penthouse (season 2) on Heart of Asia^{2}
- May 2: Encounter on Kapamilya Channel^{1}
- May 7: Signal on GTV^{4}^{21}
- May 16: Gulong ng Palad (2006), Lastikman, Nagsimula sa Puso, The General's Daughter and The Story of Us on Jeepney TV^{1}
- May 21: Wicked Angel on Heart of Asia^{2}
- May 22: Love Beyond Time on Heart of Asia^{2}
- May 22: Mula sa Puso (2011) on Jeepney TV^{1}
- May 23: Pyra: Babaeng Apoy and When the Weather Is Fine on Heart of Asia^{2}
- May 28: Misty on Heart of Asia^{2}
- May 29: Wolfblood (season 1) on GTV^{2}
- May 30: Game of Affection on Heart of Asia^{2}
- May 30: Code Name: Terrius on Kapamilya Channel^{1}
- June 4: A Beautiful Affair on Jeepney TV^{1}
- June 5: Ready, Set, Read! and Wow! on Kapamilya Channel^{23}
- June 6: Innocent Defendant^{2}^{26} and Woman of Dignity^{2} on Heart of Asia
- June 6: Dyosa and Sa Piling Mo on Jeepney TV^{1}
- June 13: In Time With You on Heart of Asia^{26}
- June 13: Natutulog Ba ang Diyos? and Walang Hanggan (2012) on Jeepney TV^{1}
- June 20: While You Were Sleeping on Heart of Asia^{2}
- June 20: Hanggang Saan on Jeepney TV^{1}
- June 26: Fire of Eternal Love on Heart of Asia^{2}
- June 27: Code Name: Yong Pal on GTV^{2}
- June 27: Marco on Jeepney TV^{2}^{5}^{16}^{25}
- July 3: Prinsesa ng Banyera on Jeepney TV^{1}
- July 4: Iskul Bukol^{3}^{27} and Pidol's Wonderland^{3} on BuKo Channel
- July 4: Playful Kiss on Heart of Asia^{2}^{26}
- July 4: Flower Crew: Dating Agency on Kapamilya Channel^{1}
- July 9: Mac and Chiz on BuKo Channel^{3}
- July 9: Fates & Furies on Heart of Asia^{2}
- July 11: Charlotte on Jeepney TV^{1}^{2}^{5}^{16}^{19}^{25}
- July 12: Etcetera on SolarFlix^{11}
- July 13: In Her Shoes on SolarFlix^{13}
- July 16: Scripting Your Destiny on Heart of Asia^{2}
- July 16: Masha and the Bear and Pororo The Little Penguin on Kapamilya Channel^{5}
- July 18: Extraordinary You on Heart of Asia^{2}
- July 18: Langit Lupa and Mutya on Jeepney TV^{1}
- July 18: Be Careful with My Heart on Kapamilya Channel^{1}
- July 24: Project Destination on GTV^{7}
- July 25: Mr. Queen on Heart of Asia^{2}
- July 31: Dinofroz on GTV^{2}
- August 1: Mr. Merman^{26} and The Sand Princess^{2} on Heart of Asia
- August 6: Pinoy Samurai on BuKo Channel^{3}
- August 6: Love Actually on Heart of Asia^{26}
- August 7: Aladdin: You Would've Heard the Name on Heart of Asia^{2}
- August 8: Lokomoko U and Wow Meganon on BuKo Channel^{3}
- August 8: Munting Heredera on Heart of Asia^{2}
- August 13: Everybody Hapi^{3} and Mongolian Barbecue^{17}^{27} on BuKo Channel
- August 15: Love in the Moonlight on GTV^{1}^{8}^{21}
- August 15: Finding Love^{26} and My Absolute Boyfriend^{7} on Heart of Asia
- August 20: Pure Intention on Heart of Asia^{26}
- August 22: Peter Pan and Wendy on Jeepney TV^{1}^{5}^{15}
- August 22: On the Wings of Love on PIE Channel^{1}
- August 27: The Peep Show on SolarFlix^{12}
- August 28: Pop Babies on Kapamilya Channel^{5}
- August 29: My Love from the Star^{2} and The Half Sisters^{2}^{18} on Heart of Asia
- August 29: Florinda, Kahit Puso'y Masugatan and Katorse on Jeepney TV^{1}
- August 29: Bagani^{1} and Melting Me Softly on Kapamilya Channel
- September 3: The Worst Witch (season 3) on GTV^{2}
- September 4: Wolfblood (season 2) on GTV^{2}
- September 5: Boys Over Flowers on Heart of Asia^{1}^{7}^{8}^{15}^{26}
- September 5: Lorenzo's Time and Sana Dalawa ang Puso on Jeepney TV^{1}
- September 12: Daisy Siete: Tinderella on BuKo Channel^{2}
- September 12: The Gifted on Heart of Asia^{2}
- September 12: Judy Abbott on Jeepney TV^{1}^{5}^{16}^{25}
- September 19: The Penthouse (season 3) on Heart of Asia^{2}
- September 19: Pieta and The Blood Sisters on Jeepney TV^{1}
- September 26: Precious Hearts Romances Presents: Kristine and The Promise of Forever on Jeepney TV^{1}
- October 2: Puppy in My Pocket: Adventures in Pocketville on GTV^{2}
- October 3: Yes, Yes Show! on Cine Mo!^{1}
- October 8: Sky Castle and While You Were Sleeping on Heart of Asia^{2}
- October 9: Inday Wanda on BuKo Channel^{3}
- October 10: Backstreet Rookie^{2}, The Frog Prince^{26} and The Gifted: Graduation^{2} on Heart of Asia
- October 10: Apoy sa Dagat on Jeepney TV^{1}
- October 15: Juan dela Cruz on Jeepney TV^{1}
- October 17: Little Women II on Jeepney TV^{1}^{5}^{25}
- October 17: Meow: The Secret Boy on Kapamilya Channel
- October 23: Love Thy Woman on Jeepney TV^{1}^{19}
- October 24: Angel's Last Mission on Heart of Asia^{2}
- October 24: My Little Juan on Jeepney TV^{1}
- October 31: Moon Embracing the Sun on Heart of Asia^{2}
- November 5: The Love Knot on Heart of Asia^{26}
- November 7: Gokusen (season 3) on Heart of Asia^{2}^{29}
- November 7: Flower of Evil, The Better Half^{1} and The Trapp Family Singers^{1}^{5}^{16}^{25} on Jeepney TV
- November 7: Flower of Evil on Kapamilya Channel
- November 12: You're My Home on Jeepney TV^{1}
- November 13: Mga Kwentong Epik on Sari-Sari Channel^{3}
- November 14: The Heirs on Heart of Asia^{1}^{8}
- November 14: Ningning on Jeepney TV^{1}
- November 19: Where Stars Land on Heart of Asia^{7}
- November 19: Bagong Umaga on Jeepney TV^{19}^{25}
- November 21: Tale of the Nine Tailed on Heart of Asia^{2}
- November 28: Christmas Cartoon Festival Presents on GTV^{2}
- November 28: Doctor John on Heart of Asia^{26}
- November 28: Ang sa Iyo ay Akin and Love in Sadness^{1} on Kapamilya Channel
- December 3: Heirs of the Night on GTV^{2}
- December 3: Secret Garden on Heart of Asia^{2}
- December 4: Hay, Bahay! on GTV^{2}
- December 12: Douluo Continent on Heart of Asia^{2}
- December 12: Ikaw ay Pag-Ibig^{1} and Remi, Nobody's Girl^{1}^{5}^{25} on Jeepney TV
- December 17: The Good Son on Jeepney TV^{1}
- December 19: Bad Genius on Heart of Asia^{2}
- December 19: Got to Believe and Saan Ka Man Naroroon on Jeepney TV^{1}
- December 25: God of Lost Fantasy and Oh My Baby on Heart of Asia^{2}
- December 26: Scarlet Heart on Heart of Asia^{2}^{26}
- December 26: Magkaribal on Jeepney TV^{1}
- December 31: Love Alert on Heart of Asia^{2}
- Notes
1. ^ ^{a} Originally aired on ABS-CBN (now Kapamilya Channel)
2. ^ ^{b} Originally aired on GMA
3. ^ ^{c} Originally aired on TV5
4. ^ ^{d} Originally aired on Cine Mo!
5. ^ ^{e} Originally aired on Yey! (now defunct)
6. ^ ^{f} Originally aired on S+A (now IZTV)
7. ^ ^{g} Originally aired on GMA News TV (now GTV)
8. ^ ^{h} Originally aired on Jeepney TV
9. ^ ^{i} Originally aired on Sari-Sari Channel
10. ^ ^{j} Originally aired on Hero (now defunct)
11. ^ ^{k} Originally aired on ETC (now SolarFlix)
12. ^ ^{l} Originally aired on Jack TV (now defunct)
13. ^ ^{m} Originally aired on 2nd Avenue (now defunct)
14. ^ ^{n} Originally aired on CT (now defunct)
15. ^ ^{o} Originally aired on Studio 23 (now IZTV)
16. ^ ^{p} Originally aired on Q (now GTV)
17. ^ ^{q} Originally aired on RPN (now CNN Philippines)
18. ^ ^{r} Originally aired on Fox Filipino (now defunct)
19. ^ ^{s} Originally aired on Kapamilya Channel
20. ^ ^{t} Originally aired on Metro Channel
21. ^ ^{u} Originally aired on Asianovela Channel (now defunct)
22. ^ ^{v} Originally aired on PTV
23. ^ ^{w} Originally aired on Knowledge Channel
24. ^ ^{x} Originally aired on CNN Philippines
25. ^ ^{y} Originally aired on A2Z
26. ^ ^{z} Originally aired on GTV
27. ^ ^{aa} Originally aired on IBC
28. ^ ^{ab} Originally aired on ABC (now TV5)
29. ^ ^{ac} Originally aired on TeleAsia Channel (now defunct)
30. ^ ^{ad} Originally aired on One Screen (now defunct)
31. ^ ^{ae} Originally aired on Colours (now defunct)

=== Video streaming services ===
The following are programs that debuted on video streaming services:

- January 12: Click, Like, Share (season 3) on iWantTFC
- January 14: Dear God (season 1) on iWantTFC and KTX
- January 23: Lulu on VivaMax
- February 14: The Goodbye Girl on iWantTFC
- February 27: L on VivaMax
- March 20: The Seniors on VivaMax
- March 26: Bola Bola on iWantTFC
- April 3: Gandara the BEKsplorer on VivaMax
- April 4: How to Move On in 30 Days on YouTube (ABS-CBN Entertainment)
- April 10: Iskandalo on VivaMax
- April 22: He's Into Her (season 2) on iWantTFC
- April 25: Misis Piggy on iWantTFC
- May 21: Run to Me on iWantTFC
- May 22: Gameboys (season 2) on KTX and VivaMax Plus
- June 5: High on Sex on VivaMax
- June 11: Ang Babae Sa Likod ng Face Mask on YouTube (Puregold Channel)
- June 23: Flower of Evil on Viu
- July 16: Beach Bros on iWantTFC
- July 30: Kumusta Bro?: The Series on VivaMax Plus
- July 30: Coke Studio Philippines (season 6) on YouTube (Coke Studio Philippines)
- July 31: Wag Mong Agawin ang Akin on VivaMax
- August 10: Lyric and Beat on iWantTFC
- August 15: Sleep With Me on iWantTFC
- August 17: Drag Race Philippines (season 1) on Discovery+, HBO Go and WOW Presents Plus
- August 19: Drag Race Philippines: Untucked! (season 1) on Discovery+, HBO Go and WOW Presents Plus
- September 3: Boys After Dark on YouTube (Rise Artists Studios)
- September 16: Love Bites on YouTube (ABS-CBN Entertainment)
- September 25: An/Na on VivaMax
- September 30: Hoy, Love You 3 on iWantTFC
- October 7: Tara, G! on iWantTFC
- October 14: K-Love on Viu
- October 23: Secrets of a Nympho on VivaMax
- November 4: Kambyoteros on YouTube (Cine Mo!)
- November 17: One Good Day on Amazon Prime Video
- December 8: Drag Den on Amazon Prime Video
- December 18: Lovely Ladies Dormitory on VivaMax

== Returning or renamed programs ==
=== Major networks ===
Show	Last aired	Retitled as/Season/Notes	Channel	Return date
Eat Well, Live Well, Stay Well	2021	Same (season 3)	GMA	January 7
I Can See You	2021 (GMA / GTV / Heart of Asia)	AlterNate	GMA / GTV	January 10
I Can See Your Voice	2021	Same (season 4)	A2Z / Kapamilya Channel	January 15
Prima Donnas	2021	Same (season 2)	GMA	January 24
Agimat ng Agila	2021	Same (season 2)	GMA	January 29
The Penthouse	2021	Same (season 3)	GMA	February 7
First Yaya	2021	First Lady	GMA / GTV	February 14
Mano Po Legacy	2022	Mano Po Legacy: Her Big Boss	GMA	March 14
Masked Singer Pilipinas	2020	Same (season 2)	TV5	March 19
Family Feud	2017 (ABS-CBN)	Same (4th incarnation)	GMA	March 21
Sing Galing!	2022 (2nd incarnation; season 1)	Same (2nd incarnation; season 2)	TV5	March 21
Magandang Gabi... Bayan	2005 (ABS-CBN)	KBYN: Kaagapay ng Bayan	A2Z / Kapamilya Channel / TeleRadyo	April 10
He's Into Her	2021	Same (season 2)	A2Z / Kapamilya Channel	April 24
Ultraman	2022 (season 23: "R/B")	Same (season 24: "Taiga")	GMA	April 30
Rolling In It Philippines	2021	Same (season 2)	TV5	May 28
Philippine Basketball Association	2022 (season 46: "Governor's Cup")	Same (season 47: "Philippine Cup")	TV5 / One Sports / PBA Rush	June 5
Pepito Manaloto	2022	Tuloy ang Kuwento	GMA	June 11
Idol Philippines	2019 (ABS-CBN)	Same (season 2)	A2Z / Kapamilya Channel / TV5	June 25
Lunch Out Loud	2021 (Colours) / 2022 (TV5)	Tropang LOL	A2Z / Kapamilya Channel / TV5	July 16
Ultraman	2022 (season 24: "Taiga")	Same (season 25: "Z")	GMA	July 24
Mars Ravelo's Darna	2010 (GMA)	Same (2022)	A2Z / Cine Mo! / Kapamilya Channel / TV5	August 15
School at Home	2022	School Anywhere	A2Z	August 22
The Wall Philippines	2021 (TV5)	Same (season 2)	GMA	August 28
Philippine Basketball Association	2022 (season 47: "Philippine Cup")	Same (season 47: "Commissioner's Cup")	TV5 / One Sports / PBA Rush	September 21
Everybody, Sing!	2021 (A2Z / Kapamilya Channel)	Same (season 2)	A2Z / Kapamilya Channel / TV5	September 24
Hoy, Love You!	2021	Hoy, Love You Two	A2Z / Kapamilya Channel	October 15
National Basketball Association	2022	Same (2022–23 season)	TV5 / One Sports / NBA TV Philippines	October 19
Sine Spotlight	2022	Cine Spotlight	TV5	October 23
Home Base Plus	2022	Same (season 23)	GMA	October 30
Mano Po Legacy	2022	The Flower Sisters	GMA	October 31
Hoy, Love You Two	2022	Hoy, Love You 3	A2Z / Kapamilya Channel	November 5

=== State-owned networks ===
Show	Last aired	Retitled as/Season/Notes	Channel	Return date
Pet Pals TV	2021 (Pinoy Xtreme)	Same (season 2)	PTV	June 19
The Chatroom	2022	Same (season 2)	PTV	July 18
Agri TV: Hayop sa Galing	2020 (S+A)	Agri TV Atbp.: Kasama sa Hanapbuhay	IBC	September 25
Entrepinas TV	2022	Same (season 2)	PTV	October 1
IBC Express Balita	2011	Same (2nd incarnation)	IBC	October 31

=== Minor networks ===
Show	Last aired	Retitled as/Season/Notes	Channel	Return date
Sa Kabukiran	2019 (ABS-CBN) / 2020 (DZMM TeleRadyo)	Sa Kabukiran at Kabuhayan	IZTV	May 14
Isyu ng Bayan	2020 (Inquirer 990 Television)	Same	IZTV	May 14
Counterpoint	2021 (PTV)	Same (3rd incarnation)	Net 25	August 31
Wowowin	2022 (GMA)	Same	All TV	September 13
Tara Game, Agad Agad!	2022	Tara Game, Agad Agad! Level Up	Net 25	October 16
UNTV Cup	2020	Same (season 9)	UNTV	November 21
Kuha Mo!	2020 (Jeepney TV / Kapamilya Channel / TeleRadyo)	Kuha All!	All TV	November 26

=== Other channels ===
Show	Last aired	Retitled as/Season/Notes	Channel	Return date
Britannia	2022	Same (season 2)	TAP Action Flix	January 15
The Real Story of...	2022	Same (season 3)	TAP Edge	January 15
I Heart PH	2020	Same (season 4)	CNN Philippines	January 23
The Kelly Clarkson Show	2022	Same (season 3)	TAP TV	January 31
The Sinner	2022	Same (season 3)	TAP Edge	February 24
The Real Story of...	2022	Same (season 4)	TAP Edge	February 26
The Handmaid's Tale	2022	Same (season 2)	TAP Movies	March 6
#MaineGoals	2022	Same (season 2)	BuKo Channel	March 7
Premier Volleyball League	2021 (season 4: "Open Conference")	Same (season 5: "Open Conference"; season 18 as Shakey's V-League)	One Sports / One Sports+	March 16
Magandang Morning	2020 (TeleRadyo)	Julius and Tintin: Para sa Pamilyang Pilipino	One PH	March 21
National Collegiate Athletic Association	2021	Same (season 97)	GTV	March 26
The Wine Show	2022	Same (season 2)	TAP TV	April 9
Siyensikat	2022	Same (season 2)	CNN Philippines	April 23
I Heart PH	2022	Same (season 5)	CNN Philippines	April 24
Maharlika Pilipinas Basketball League	2021 (IBC / TAP Sports)	Same (season 4)	One PH	April 25
Business Matters	2021	Same (season 8)	CNN Philippines	April 30
Chinese by Blood, Filipino by Heart	2021	Same (season 2)	CNN Philippines	May 15
Mind S-Cool	2021	Same (season 4)	One PH	June 26
Premier Volleyball League	2022 (season 5: "Open Conference")	Same (season 5: "Invitational Conference"; season 18 as Shakey's V-League)	One Sports / One Sports+	July 9
The Final Pitch	2021	Same (season 8)	CNN Philippines	July 31
Business Matters	2022	Same (season 9)	CNN Philippines	August 27
Spikers' Turf	2019 (season 3: "Open Conference")	Same (season 4: "Open Conference")	One Sports / One Sports+	August 30
The Bold Type	2020 (ETC)	Same (season 4)	TAP TV	September 4
National Collegiate Athletic Association	2022	Same (season 98)	GTV	September 10
PBA 3x3	2022	Same (season 2)	One Sports / PBA Rush	September 10
University Athletic Association of the Philippines	2022	Same (season 85)	One Sports / UAAP Varsity Channel	October 1
Premier Volleyball League	2022 (season 5: "Invitational Conference")	Same (season 5: "Reinforced Conference"; season 18 as Shakey's V-League)	One Sports / One Sports+	October 8
I Heart PH	2022	Same (season 6)	CNN Philippines	October 16

=== Video streaming services ===
Show	Last aired	Retitled as/Season/Notes	Service	Return date
Click, Like, Share	2021	Same (season 3)	iWantTFC	January 12
He's Into Her	2021	Same (season 2)	iWantTFC	April 22
Gameboys	2020 (YouTube; The IdeaFirst Company)	Same (season 2)	KTX / VivaMax Plus	May 22
Coke Studio Philippines	2021	Same (season 6)	YouTube (Coke Studio Philippines)	July 30
Hoy, Love You Two	2021	Hoy, Love You 3	iWantTFC	September 30

== Programs transferring networks ==
=== Major networks ===
Date	Show	No. of seasons	Moved from	Moved to
March 21	Family Feud	—N/a	ABS-CBN (now Kapamilya Channel)	GMA
March 27	Beyond Today	—N/a	GMA News TV (now GTV)	GMA
April 10	Magandang Gabi... Bayan	—N/a	ABS-CBN (now Kapamilya Channel)	A2Z / Kapamilya Channel / TeleRadyo (as KBYN: Kaagapay ng Bayan)
June 25	Idol Philippines	2	ABS-CBN (now Kapamilya Channel)	A2Z / Kapamilya Channel / TV5
August 15	Mars Ravelo's Darna	—N/a	GMA	A2Z / Cine Mo! / Kapamilya Channel / TV5
August 28	The Wall Philippines	2	TV5	GMA

=== State-owned networks ===
Date	Show	No. of seasons	Moved from	Moved to
June 19	Pet Pals TV	2	Pinoy Xtreme	PTV
September 25	Agri TV: Hayop sa Galing	—N/a	S+A (now IZTV)	IBC (as Agri TV Atbp.: Kasama sa Hanapbuhay)

=== Minor networks ===
Date	Show	No. of seasons	Moved from	Moved to
May 14	Sa Kabukiran	—N/a	ABS-CBN (now Kapamilya Channel) / DZMM TeleRadyo (now TeleRadyo)	IZTV (as Sa Kabukiran at Kabuhayan)
May 14	Isyu ng Bayan	—N/a	Inquirer 990 Television (now defunct)	IZTV
August 31	Counterpoint	—N/a	PTV	Net 25
September 13	Wowowin	—N/a	GMA	All TV
November 26	Kuha Mo!	—N/a	Jeepney TV / Kapamilya Channel / TeleRadyo	All TV (as Kuha All!)

=== Other channels ===
Date	Show	No. of seasons	Moved from	Moved to
January 8	Discover Eats	—N/a	Colours (now defunct)	One PH
January 8	From Helen's Kitchen	—N/a	Colours (now defunct)	One PH
January 8	MomBiz	—N/a	Colours (now defunct)	One PH
January 10	PGA Tour	—N/a	One Sports+	Premier Sports 2
February 21	Good Girls	—N/a	TAP TV	TAP Edge
March 21	Magandang Morning	—N/a	TeleRadyo	One PH (as Julius and Tintin: Para sa Pamilyang Pilipino)
March 26	University Athletic Association of the Philippines	84	Liga (now defunct) / S+A (now IZTV)	One Sports / UAAP Varsity Channel
April 25	Maharlika Pilipinas Basketball League	4	IBC / TAP Sports	One PH
September 4	The Bold Type	3	ETC (now SolarFlix)	TAP TV

=== Video streaming services ===
Date	Show	No. of seasons	Moved from	Moved to
May 22	Gameboys	2	YouTube (The IdeaFirst Company)	KTX / VivaMax Plus

== Milestone episodes ==
The following shows that made their milestone episodes in 2022:

Show	Network	Episode #	Episode title	Episode air date
Tadhana	GMA	200th	"Tres Marias (Part 2)"	January 1
Pinoy Big Brother: Kumunity Season 10	A2Z / Jeepney TV / Kapamilya Channel	100th	"New Family"	January 24
Dapat Alam Mo!	GMA / GTV	100th	"100th Episode"	March 4
Ano Sa Palagay N'yo?	Net 25	100th	"100th Episode"	March 4
FPJ's Ang Probinsyano	A2Z / Cine Mo! / Kapamilya Channel / TV5	1,600th	"Kaba"	March 28
Viral Scandal	A2Z / Jeepney TV / Kapamilya Channel / TV5	100th	"Breaking News"	April 1
Amazing Earth	GMA	200th	"200th Episode"	April 10
Kapamilya Journeys of Hope	TeleRadyo	100th	"100th Special Episode"	April 16
Prima Donnas	GMA	300th	"Payback"	April 18
Pinoy Big Brother: Kumunity Season 10	A2Z / Jeepney TV / Kapamilya Channel	200th	"Road to Final 5"	May 4
Niña Niño	TV5	200th	"Finale Week"	May 16
The Broken Marriage Vow	A2Z / Jeepney TV / Kapamilya Channel / TV5	100th	"Losing Control"	June 15
Dapat Alam Mo!	GTV	200th	"200th Episode"	July 22
Family Feud (4th incarnation)	GMA	100th	"100th Episode"	August 11
ASAP Natin 'To	A2Z / Jeepney TV / Kapamilya Channel / TV5	9,600th	"Proyals"	August 21
Magpakailanman	GMA	500th	"My Kidney Belongs to You"	August 27
Apoy sa Langit	GMA	100th	"Ghost of Lucy"	August 29
2 Good 2 Be True (2G2BT)	A2Z / Jeepney TV / Kapamilya Channel / TV5	100th	"2 Good Boyfriend Duties"	September 30
Love in 40 Days	A2Z / Jeepney TV / Kapamilya Channel / TV5	100th	"New Ally"	October 14
Daig Kayo ng Lola Ko	GMA	200th	"Game Over"	November 6
Sing Galing! (2nd incarnation)	TV5	100th	"100th Episode"	November 7
Dapat Alam Mo!	GMA / GTV	300th	"300th Episode"	November 11
TiktoClock	GMA	100th	"100th Episode"	December 9
It's Showtime	A2Z / Jeepney TV / Kapamilya Channel / TV5	3,600th	"3,600th Episode"	December 24
Abot-Kamay na Pangarap	GMA	100th	"Sila Na"	December 30
Mars Ravelo's Darna (2022)	A2Z / Cine Mo! / Kapamilya Channel / TV5	100th	"Xtra New Year"	December 30

== Finales ==
=== Major networks ===
==== A2Z ====
The following are programs that ended on A2Z:

- January 2: Come and Hug Me
- January 21: Marry Me, Marry You
- January 29: Aksyon Time (seasons 1 and 2), Peppa Pig (seasons 1 and 2; Kidz Weekend) and Rob the Robot (Kidz Weekend)
- February 4: La Vida Lena (full series)
- February 18: Nang Ngumiti ang Langit
- March 2: Prayerline
- March 4: Word for the Season and Worship, Word and Wonders
- March 25: Love Thy Woman
- March 26: PJ Masks (Kidz Weekend; rerun)
- April 3: Zine Love (A2Z Zinema)
- April 10: F4 Thailand: Boys Over Flowers and Inazuma Eleven GO: Chrono Stone (Kidz Weekend)
- April 13: Touch Your Heart
- May 13: Viral Scandal
- May 27: Meow: The Secret Boy (rerun)
- May 29: Pinoy Big Brother: Kumunity Season 10
- June 18: My Papa Pi (season 1)
- June 19: I Can See Your Voice season 4 and Pinoy Big Brother: Kumunity Season 10 Big Homecoming
- June 24: The Broken Marriage Vow
- June 25: Care Bears: Unlock the Magic (Kidz Weekend) and Oddbods (seasons 1 and 2; Kidz Weekend)
- July 15: Code Name: Terrius
- July 31: Lego Ninjago (seasons 1 and 2; Kidz Weekend)
- August 12: FPJ's Ang Probinsyano
- August 14: He's Into Her (season 2)
- August 26: Init sa Magdamag (rerun)
- September 4: Bola Bola
- September 18: Idol Philippines season 2
- October 2: Run to Me
- October 9: Flower of Evil
- October 28: Love in 40 Days
- October 30: Hoy, Love You Two
- November 4: A Family Affair
- November 11: 2 Good 2 Be True (2G2BT)
- November 13: Hoy, Love You 3
- November 25: Bagani
- November 27: Lyric and Beat
- December 10: Maalaala Mo Kaya
- December 11: Click, Like, Share (season 3) and Mang Lalakbay (Kidz Weekend)
- December 18: Charlotte (Kidz Weekend; rerun)
- December 30: Be My Lady
- December 31: Pororo the Little Penguin (Kidz Weekend)

===== Stopped airing =====
Program	Last airing	Resumed airing	Reason
Balitang A2Z	January 7	January 12	Temporary suspension of broadcast due to limitations in the implementation of appropriate health and safety protocols in their newsroom in Pasig.
Ipaglaban Mo!	January 30	April 10	Temporary suspension of broadcast due to the host's running as a candidate for a government position in the 2022 elections.
Magandang Buhay	February 3	February 7	Pre-empted by Panata sa Bayan: The KBP Presidential Forum.
Bro. Eddie Villanueva Classics	February 7	March 7	Temporary suspension of broadcast due to the host's running as a candidate for a government position in the 2022 elections.
Zinema sa Umaga (Weekday edition)	July 15	May 1, 2023	Program replaced by Tropang LOL on July 16.

==== GMA ====
The following are programs that ended on GMA Network:

- January 7: Stories from the Heart and The World Between Us (season 2)
- January 8: Ghost Fighter (rerun)
- January 14: Las Hermanas
- January 15: Karelasyon (rerun)
- January 20: My Love from the Star (rerun)
- January 21: The Gifted: Graduation
- February 4: I Can See You: AlterNate
- February 11: I Left My Heart in Sorsogon, The Worst Witch (season 3) and Wowowin
- February 13: Dear Uge
- February 25: Bad Genius and Mano Po Legacy: The Family Fortune
- March 4: Ang Lihim ni Annasandra (rerun)
- March 11: The Penthouse (season 3)
- March 17: Queen and I (rerun)
- March 20: Home Base Plus (season 22)
- March 27: Toriko (season 2; rerun)
- March 31: My Husband-in-Law
- April 1: Eat Well, Live Well, Stay Well (season 3)
- April 13: Backstreet Rookie
- April 22: Douluo Continent and Little Princess
- April 24: Ultraman R/B
- April 29: Widows' Web
- April 30: Prima Donnas (season 2)
- May 6: Princess Hours
- May 7: Agimat ng Agila (season 2)
- May 27: False Positive and One the Woman
- June 2: I Hear Your Voice (rerun) and Mano Po Legacy: Her Big Boss
- June 3: Artikulo 247
- June 4: Pepito Manaloto: Ang Unang Kuwento
- June 5: Raya Sirena and The Best Ka!
- June 10: Gokusen (season 1; rerun)
- June 17: The Herbal Master and The Witch's Diner
- July 1: First Lady, The Maid and Mars Pa More
- July 8: Man of Vengeance and The Worst Witch (season 3; rerun)
- July 17: Dinofroz
- July 23: Ultraman Taiga
- July 29: Raising Mamay
- August 11: Love You Stranger
- August 12: Show Window: The Queen's House
- August 25: The Skywatcher
- August 26: Bolera and Prophecy of Love
- August 27: Jose & Maria's Bonggang Villa
- August 28: Puppy in My Pocket: Adventures in Pocketville (rerun)
- September 2: Balitang Amianan (GMA Dagupan and GMA Ilocos)
- September 3: Apoy sa Langit
- September 16: My Forever Sunshine
- September 17: Daimos (2017 dub reboot; rerun)
- September 23: About Time, Miss the Dragon and The Fake Life
- September 30: Lolong (season 1)
- October 6: One Night Steal
- October 7: The Red Sleeve
- October 16: Ultraman Z
- October 23: Angry Birds Toons (rerun)
- October 27: What We Could Be
- October 28: Goblin and Gokusen (season 2; rerun)
- October 30: Happy ToGetHer (seasons 1 and 2)
- November 4: Return to Paradise and To Me, It's Simply You
- November 11: Eat Well, Live Well, Stay Well (season 4)
- November 20: Yo-kai Watch Shadowside
- November 25: The New Legends of Monkey
- December 2: Ghost Doctor
- December 4: The Wall Philippines (season 2)
- December 16: Put Your Head on My Shoulder
- December 18: Running Man Philippines (season 1)
- December 23: Start-Up PH
- December 29: The Wolf
- December 30: My Shy Boss

===== Stopped airing =====
Program	Last airing	Resumed airing	Reason
Pepito Manaloto: Ang Unang Kuwento	January 15	January 29	Pre-empted by The Jessica Soho Presidential Interviews.
Dapat Alam Mo!	March 18	July 31, 2023	Program replaced by the 4th incarnation of Family Feud and Luv Is: Love at First Read.
Born to Be Wild	April 24	May 8	Pre-empted by the delayed telecast of Miss Universe Philippines 2022.
IBilib	April 24	May 8	Pre-empted by the delayed telecast of Miss Universe Philippines 2022.
Tadhana	April 30	May 14	Pre-empted by Miss U: A Journey to the Promise Land.
GMA Blockbusters	May 8	June 5	Pre-empted by the 97th season of National Collegiate Athletic Association.
GMA Blockbusters	November 27	December 25	Pre-empted by the 98th season of National Collegiate Athletic Association.
Dragon Ball Z (rerun)	July 23	September 19	Series break.
Daig Kayo ng Lola Ko	August 28	November 6	Season break.
Bubble Gang	September 2	September 16	Pre-empted by Shopee 9.9 special.
Amazing Earth	November 27	December 11	Pre-empted by the 98th season of National Collegiate Athletic Association.

==== TV5 ====
The following are programs that ended on TV5:

- January 8: María la del Barrio (1995)
- January 21: Marry Me, Marry You and True Beauty
- January 29: Kagat ng Dilim (2020; rerun)
- February 4: La Vida Lena (full series)
- February 19: #ParangNormal Activity (rerun)
- March 5: Sing Galing: Sing-lebrity Edition (season 1)
- March 6: M Countdown and My Hero Academia (seasons 1 and 2)
- March 17: Sing Galing! (2nd incarnation; season 1)
- March 18: Reply 1988 (rerun)
- April 13: Adventure Time (rerun), Dexter's Laboratory (rerun), Ed, Edd n Eddy (rerun), Generator Rex (rerun), The Marvelous Misadventures of Flapjack (rerun) and Touch Your Heart
- May 12: Remember: War of the Son
- May 13: Viral Scandal
- May 19: Niña Niño
- May 27: Meow: The Secret Boy
- May 28: Krypton and Marimar (1994; rerun)
- May 29: Designated Survivor
- June 11: DC's Legends of Tomorrow season 2 (rerun)
- June 18: Masked Singer Pilipinas season 2
- June 19: The Chiefs
- June 24: The Broken Marriage Vow
- July 9: Sari-Sari Presents: Viva Cinema
- July 12: Enchanted Garden (Throwback Favorites Presents; rerun)
- July 14: Dear God (season 1)
- July 15: 44 Cats, Lakwatsika, Regal Academy and Winx Club (rerun)
- August 12: FPJ's Ang Probinsyano
- August 19: Reina de corazones
- August 20: Top Class
- September 16: Cine Cinco Hollywood Edition
- September 18: Idol Philippines season 2 and Sine Todo
- September 23: My Hero Academia (seasons 1 and 2; rerun)
- September 24: Rolling In It Philippines (season 2)
- October 8: Puto (2021 television remake; rerun)
- October 11: BalitaOnenan! (season 1), Lokomoko (Happy Naman D'yan!; rerun), Lokomoko U (Happy Naman D'yan!; rerun), Tropa Mo Ko Unli (Happy Naman D'yan!; rerun) and Wow Mali Pa Rin! (Happy Naman D'yan!; rerun)
- October 13: María la del Barrio (1995; rerun)
- October 15: Mga Kwentong Epik
- October 16: Samurai Jack (rerun) and Sine Todo: Family Hollywood
- October 28: Love in 40 Days
- November 4: A Family Affair
- November 11: 2 Good 2 Be True (2G2BT)
- November 26: Oh My Korona
- December 3: Sing Galing Kids
- December 8: Suntok sa Buwan
- December 22: Sing Galing! (2nd incarnation; season 2)
- December 24: Kalye Kweens

===== Stopped airing =====
Program	Last airing	Resumed airing	Reason
Lokomoko (Happy Naman D'yan!; rerun)	February 6	July 18	Series break.
Lokomoko U (Happy Naman D'yan!; rerun)	February 6	July 18	Series break.
Tropa Mo Ko Unli (Happy Naman D'yan!; rerun)	February 6	July 18	Series break.
Wow Mali Pa Rin! (Happy Naman D'yan!; rerun)	February 6	July 18	Series break.
Cine Cinco Hollywood Edition	February 9	April 27	Pre-empted by the 46th season of Philippine Basketball Association.
Cine Cinco Hollywood Edition	April 29	May 18	Pre-empted by the 84th season of University Athletic Association of the Philippines.
Cine Cinco Hollywood Edition	May 27	August 19	Pre-empted by the 47th season of Philippine Basketball Association.
Krypton	March 12	May 7	Pre-empted by the 2022 elections-related special programming.
Sine Spotlight	March 13	April 3	Pre-empted by the finale episode replays of both the 2nd incarnation of Sing Galing! and Sing Galing: Sing-lebrity Edition.
Sine Todo	March 20	April 10	Program replaced by the returning FPJ: Da King on March 27.
Sine Todo	May 8	May 29	Pre-empted by the sports-related programming.

=== State-owned networks ===
==== PTV ====
The following are programs that ended on People's Television Network:

- February 25: Sundown (season 2)
- March 27: One DA sa TV
- May 5: The Chatroom
- May 6: Know Your Candidates
- May 7: Paliwanag: The 2022 Election Townhall Series
- June 6: Talk to the People on COVID-19
- June 24: Cabinet Report and Network Briefing News
- June 29: Tutok Tulfo 2.0 and Tutok PDEA: Kontra Droga
- July 1: Digong 8888 Hotline
- July 9: Magandang Gabi Pilipinas
- July 10: Unlad Pilipinas
- July 11: PNA Newsroom
- September 4: Tulay: Your Bridge to Understanding, Peace and Prosperity
- September 11: Pet Pals TV (season 2)
- December 31: KooPinoy: ACDI MPC'S Cooperative TV

==== Unknown ====
- Du30 on Duty

==== IBC ====
The following are programs that ended on IBC:

- February 27: Minning Town
- April 28: Bet to Serve
- June 4: DepEd TV
- June 10: PNA Newsroom
- June 24: Network Briefing News
- June 25: Youth for Truth
- September 25: F.Y.I.
- November 20: Shakey's Super League

==== Unknown ====
- ASEAN Spotlight TV
- Du30 on Duty
- Lumad TV
- Salaam TV

=== Minor networks ===
The following are programs that ended on minor networks:

- January 20: Balitalakayan on Net 25
- March 17: Ano Sa Palagay N'yo?: Primetime on Net 25
- March 19: Agila Probinsiya on Net 25
- April 1: Eagle News International and Funniest Snackable Videos on Net 25
- April 30: Eagle News UK and Europe on Net 25
- April 30: Istorya on UNTV
- May 15: Tara Game, Agad Agad! on Net 25
- May 22: EBC Sports International on Net 25
- June 3: Balita at Talakayan and Teka-Teka... Si Señor Rey Pacheco Na! on IZTV
- June 4: Cucina ni Nadia on Net 25
- June 24: Panalo o Talo, It's You! on Net 25
- June 29: DepEd TV on BEAM TV
- July 15: Never Twice on Net 25
- August 5: Let's Get Ready To TV Radyo on Net 25
- August 12: EZ Shop on Net 25
- September 16: K-Lite 103.5 FM on All TV
- September 24: Bida Kayo Kay Aga on Net 25
- September 25: InstaJam on All TV
- September 30: Toni Talks on All TV
- September 30: Palabra de Amor on Net 25
- October 22: Biyaheng Langit and Kasangga Mo ang Langit on RJ DigiTV
- October 23: River Where the Moon Rises on All TV
- November 2: Tambayan sa DWIZ on IZTV
- November 27: Again My Life on All TV
- November 27: Pasiklaban sa DWIZ on IZTV
- November 27: Healing Galing Live! on UNTV
- December 9: Mi Esperanza on Net 25

==== Unknown ====
- Bless Pilipinas, Light Up and Road Trip Refueled on Light TV

==== Stopped airing ====
Program	Last airing	Resumed airing	Reason
Shuffle: Honoring God Through Music	December 31	January 1, 2024	Temporarily suspension due to the new adjustment programming schedule for Light TV by the start of 2023.

=== Other channels ===
The following are programs that ended on other channels:

- January 1: The Shannara Chronicles (season 2) on GTV
- January 1: Raket Science on One PH
- January 2: Angry Birds Blues and Piggy Tales: Third Act on GTV
- January 2: The Best Talk with Boy Abunda (season 2) and The Haunted on Jeepney TV
- January 2: Come and Hug Me on Kapamilya Channel
- January 7: Finding Love and The World Between Us (season 2) on GTV
- January 7: Fates & Furies, I Left My Heart in Sorsogon (remaining episodes continued via GMA and GTV) and The World Between Us (season 2) on Heart of Asia
- January 8: Business Matters (season 7) on CNN Philippines
- January 10: Stories of Hope on GTV
- January 11: On Record on GTV
- January 12: Tunay na Buhay on GTV
- January 14: Nakee (rerun) and The Romantic Doctor 2 on Heart of Asia
- January 14: Max Steel on Jeepney TV
- January 16: Merry Flixmas on Hallypop
- January 21: Marry Me, Marry You on Jeepney TV
- January 21: I am Not a Robot (rerun) and Marry Me, Marry You on Kapamilya Channel
- January 28: Kakambal ni Eliana on Heart of Asia
- January 28: Oh My G! (rerun) on Jeepney TV
- January 29: Max Steel and Uncoupling on Kapamilya Channel
- January 30: Pokémon the Series: Sun and Moon on GTV
- January 30: Home Along Da Riles (rerun) and Ipaglaban Mo! on Jeepney TV
- February 4: Iskul Bukol, Moomoo & Me and Pidol's Wonderland on BuKo Channel
- February 4: I Can See You: AlterNate on GTV
- February 4: The Blooming Treasure on Heart of Asia
- February 4: La Vida Lena and Starla (rerun) on Jeepney TV
- February 4: La Vida Lena (full series) on Kapamilya Channel
- February 4: It Had to Be You on Telenovela Channel
- February 5: Hell's Kitchen season 18 on TAP TV
- February 11: I Left My Heart in Sorsogon on GTV
- February 11: Rising Sun (season 2) on Heart of Asia
- February 11: Nasaan Ka Nang Kailangan Kita (rerun) on Jeepney TV
- February 14: Riviera on TAP Edge
- February 17: The Sinner (season 2) on TAP Edge
- February 18: The Frog Prince on GTV
- February 18: The Love Knot on Heart of Asia
- February 18: Nang Ngumiti ang Langit on Kapamilya Channel
- February 19: Kongsuni and Friends on Jeepney TV
- February 25: Mano Po Legacy: The Family Fortune on GTV
- February 25: Dahil sa Pag-Ibig (2012) and Vietnam Rose on Jeepney TV
- February 27: The Handmaid's Tale (season 1) on TAP Movies
- March 4: Moon Embracing the Sun on GTV
- March 4: The Penthouse (season 1) on Heart of Asia
- March 4: Aryana (rerun) on Jeepney TV
- March 4: Papá a toda madre on Telenovela Channel
- March 6: TableLove with Pinky on ETC
- March 8: Noughts + Crosses (season 1) on TAP Edge
- March 11: Pure Intention and Rhodora X on Heart of Asia
- March 11: Tayong Dalawa (rerun) on Jeepney TV
- March 11: Something in the Rain on Kapamilya Channel
- March 15: Fairy Tail (season 3) on GTV
- March 18: Kadenang Ginto on Jeepney TV
- March 18: Jay Leno's Garage (season 2) on TAP Sports
- March 19: Hello from the Other Side on GTV
- March 19: The Legal Wife (rerun) on Jeepney TV
- March 19: Britannia (season 2) on TAP Action Movies
- March 20: Born for You on Jeepney TV
- March 25: Girl Next Room on GTV
- March 25: Love Thy Woman (rerun) on Kapamilya Channel
- March 26: Buena Manong Balita (Saturday edition; Dobol B TV) on GTV
- March 26: Price of Passion on Heart of Asia
- March 30: After the Fact on ANC
- April 1: Prince of Wolf and Two Spirits' Love on Heart of Asia
- April 2: We Rise Together on Kapamilya Channel
- April 3: Sunday Kapamilya Blockbusters on Kapamilya Channel
- April 8: The Desire on Heart of Asia
- April 8: Kokey (rerun) and Lovers in Paris on Jeepney TV
- April 8: Hyde Jekyll, Me on Kapamilya Channel
- April 10: AgriCOOLture and F4 Thailand: Boys Over Flowers on Kapamilya Channel
- April 13: Hiram na Alaala on Heart of Asia
- April 13: Touch Your Heart on Jeepney TV and Kapamilya Channel
- April 14: The Sinner (season 3) on TAP Edge
- April 15: Adventures of Sonic the Hedgehog on Jeepney TV
- April 15: The Two Lives of Estela Carrillo on Telenovela Channel
- April 16: Young Rock (season 1) on TAP TV
- April 17: I Heart PH (season 4) on CNN Philippines
- April 22: Endless Love (season 2; ETCerye) on ETC
- April 22: Lie After Lie on Heart of Asia
- April 22: Hiram na Mukha and Huwag Ka Lang Mawawala (rerun) on Jeepney TV
- April 25: Good Girls (season 1) on TAP Edge
- April 29: Widows' Web on GTV
- April 29: Scarlet Heart on Heart of Asia
- April 29: Mama Fairy and the Woodcutter on Kapamilya Channel
- April 29: The Dark Widow on Telenovela Channel
- May 6: Doctor John on GTV
- May 8: Green Rose on Jeepney TV
- May 13: Kahit Isang Saglit (rerun), Mirabella (rerun), Sana Maulit Muli (rerun), The Wedding and Viral Scandal on Jeepney TV
- May 13: Viral Scandal on Kapamilya Channel
- May 14: Precious Hearts Romances Presents: Midnight Phantom (rerun) on Jeepney TV
- May 15: The Last Empress (rerun) on Heart of Asia
- May 15: Komiks Presents: Wakasan (rerun) on Jeepney TV
- May 18: The Equalizer (2021, season 1) on TAP Edge
- May 20: Oh My Baby and The Borrowed Wife on Heart of Asia
- May 22: The Bureau of Magical Things (season 1) on GTV
- May 22: When Duty Calls on Heart of Asia
- May 27: BalitaOnenan! (season 1) on BuKo Channel
- May 27: False Positive on GTV
- May 27: Princess Weiyoung on Heart of Asia
- May 27: Meow: The Secret Boy on Jeepney TV
- May 27: Meow: The Secret Boy (rerun) on Kapamilya Channel
- May 27: All Politics is Local on One News and One PH
- May 29: Pinoy Big Brother: Kumunity Season 10 and We Rise Together on Jeepney TV
- May 29: AgriKids, Pahina and Pinoy Big Brother: Kumunity Season 10 on Kapamilya Channel
- May 29: The Handmaid's Tale (season 2) on TAP Movies
- May 29: TeleRadyo Balita Weekend on TeleRadyo
- June 3: Emperor: Ruler of the Mask (rerun) and The Penthouse (season 2) on Heart of Asia
- June 3: Maging Sino Ka Man (2006; rerun) on Jeepney TV
- June 9: Celebrity Playtime (rerun) on Jeepney TV
- June 10: My Love from Another Star on Heart of Asia
- June 10: Ina, Kapatid, Anak (rerun) and Palimos ng Pag-ibig (rerun) on Jeepney TV
- June 10: The Girl in the Woods on TAP Edge
- June 17: God of Lost Fantasy on Heart of Asia
- June 17: Sana Bukas pa ang Kahapon (rerun) on Jeepney TV
- June 17: Hwayugi: A Korean Odyssey on Kapamilya Channel
- June 18: Legend of Paranormal Story (rerun) on GTV
- June 18: My Papa Pi (season 1) and We Rise Together on Kapamilya Channel
- June 19: Legend of Fuyao (rerun) on Heart of Asia
- June 19: I Can See Your Voice season 4 and Pinoy Big Brother: Kumunity Season 10 Big Homecoming on Kapamilya Channel
- June 24: Legend of the Blue Sea and Me Always You on GTV
- June 24: Johnny Test (season 4; rerun) and The Broken Marriage Vow on Jeepney TV
- June 24: The Broken Marriage Vow on Kapamilya Channel
- June 26: Taste Buddies on GTV
- June 26: Kay Tagal Kang Hinintay (rerun) on Jeepney TV
- July 1: H3O: Ha Ha Ha Over and Lokomoko High on BuKo Channel
- July 1: First Lady on GTV
- July 1: When the Weather Is Fine on Heart of Asia
- July 1: Encounter on Kapamilya Channel
- July 3: Sugo Mga Kapatid on BuKo Channel
- July 3: Misty (rerun) on Heart of Asia
- July 8: ETCinema on ETC
- July 8: The Garfield Show on Jeepney TV
- July 8: Jay Leno's Garage (season 3) on TAP Sports
- July 9: Art of the Spirit on Heart of Asia
- July 9: Adventures of Sonic the Hedgehog on Kapamilya Channel
- July 10: Flirty Dancing (season 2) and Guest Star on ETC
- July 10: The Dean Mel Show on One PH
- July 15: Game of Affection on Heart of Asia
- July 15: Gulong ng Palad (2006; rerun) and Lastikman (rerun) on Jeepney TV
- July 15: Code Name: Terrius (rerun) on Kapamilya Channel
- July 15: Ordinary Joe on TAP Edge
- July 16: Tech Ka Muna on One PH
- July 17: Chinese by Blood, Filipino by Heart (season 2) and I Heart PH (season 5) on CNN Philippines
- July 17: Wolfblood (season 1) on GTV
- July 22: Innocent Defendant on Heart of Asia
- July 23: Business Matters (season 8) on CNN Philippines
- July 29: Metro Manila Ngayon (2nd incarnation) on DZRH TV
- July 29: While You Were Sleeping (rerun) and Woman of Dignity (rerun) on Heart of Asia
- July 31: Celebrity Samurai and Tropang Trumpo on BuKo Channel
- July 31: Super Laff-In (1996) and Trabahanap TV on Cine Mo!
- July 31: Love Beyond Time on Heart of Asia
- July 31: Mind S-Cool (season 4) on One PH
- August 5: Dwarfina on Heart of Asia
- August 12: FPJ's Ang Probinsyano on Cine Mo! and Kapamilya Channel
- August 12: Code Name: Yong Pal on GTV
- August 12: In Time With You and Playful Kiss on Heart of Asia
- August 13: Scripting Your Destiny on Heart of Asia
- August 14: Fates & Furies (rerun) on Heart of Asia
- August 14: He's Into Her (season 2) on Kapamilya Channel
- August 19: Charlotte on Jeepney TV
- August 20: In Her Shoes on SolarFlix
- August 21: Barangayan, Lokal, Oohlascope, Oohlat Weather, Sumpungan Team Slapsoil on PIE Channel
- August 26: Behind Your Smile and Bolera on GTV
- August 26: Pyra: Babaeng Apoy and The Sand Princess on Heart of Asia
- August 26: Nagsimula sa Puso, Natutulog Ba ang Diyos? and The Story of Us (rerun) on Jeepney TV
- August 26: Flower Crew: Dating Agency and Init sa Magdamag (rerun) on Kapamilya Channel
- August 27: Mako Mermaids on GTV
- August 28: Project Destination on GTV
- August 31: Slam Dunk on GTV
- September 2: News.PH (2nd incarnation) on CNN Philippines
- September 2: Extraordinary You (rerun) on Heart of Asia
- September 2: Hanggang Saan (rerun) and Mutya (rerun) on Jeepney TV
- September 2: Road to Destiny on Telenovela Channel
- September 3: K-Drama Special Stories on GTV
- September 4: Hunter × Hunter (season 2; 2011; rerun) and Sine Date Weekends on GTV
- September 4: Bola Bola on Kapamilya Channel
- September 4: WWE NXT UK on TAP Sports
- September 9: Leya, ang Pinakamagandang Babae sa Ilalim ng Lupa on BuKo Channel
- September 9: Mr. Merman on Heart of Asia
- September 9: Marco on Jeepney TV
- September 9: Almusal All G, Barangayan, Bida Body Part, Gscovery, Oohlat, Palong Follow, Playlist, Playlist Natin, Pera o Bayong (PoB), and Swerteng Sulpot Jr. on PIE Channel
- September 9: Corazón Salvaje on Telenovela Channel
- September 10: Signal on GTV
- September 10: Dr. Cares on PIE Channel
- September 11: Hay, Bahay! on GTV
- September 11: Swerteng Sulpot on PIE Channel
- September 16: Mr. Queen on Heart of Asia
- September 16: Sa Piling Mo (rerun) and The General's Daughter on Jeepney TV
- September 16: A Beloved Man on Telenovela Channel
- September 17: Bubble Gang and Pepito Manaloto on BuKo Channel
- September 17: TOLS on GTV
- September 17: From the Heart Specials: Like a Fairytale and Wicked Angel (rerun) on Heart of Asia
- September 18: Idol Philippines season 2 on Kapamilya Channel
- September 23: Florinda and Langit Lupa (rerun) on Jeepney TV
- September 25: Yo-Kai Watch (seasons 1 to 3) on GTV
- September 25: Rolling In It Philippines (season 2) on Sari-Sari Channel
- September 30: Banana Split on Cine Mo!
- September 30: Lolong (season 1) on GTV
- September 30: Ugnayang Gobyerno at Mamamayan on Radyo Bandido TV
- October 2: The Final Pitch (season 8) on CNN Philippines
- October 2: Pure Intention (rerun) on Heart of Asia
- October 2: Run to Me on Kapamilya Channel
- October 7: Finding Love, My Absolute Boyfriend (rerun) and The Gifted on Heart of Asia
- October 7: My Sweet Curse on Telenovela Channel
- October 8: Ikaw Lamang (rerun) on Jeepney TV
- October 9: Wolfblood (season 2) on GTV
- October 9: Flower of Evil on Jeepney TV and Kapamilya Channel
- October 12: Touching You (ETCerye) on SolarFlix
- October 14: Peter Pan and Wendy on Jeepney TV
- October 14: Melting Me Softly (rerun) on Kapamilya Channel
- October 16: Budoy (rerun) on Jeepney TV
- October 16: The Little Drummer Girl on TAP Edge
- October 17: Monkey and Dog Romance (ETCerye) on SolarFlix
- October 21: My Love from the Star on Heart of Asia
- October 21: Lorenzo's Time (rerun) on Jeepney TV
- October 21: Bubble Up (ETCerye) and Endless Love (season 2; ETCerye Rewind) on SolarFlix
- October 23: La Doña on Heart of Asia
- October 28: What We Could Be on GTV
- October 28: The Penthouse (season 3) on Heart of Asia
- October 28: Love in 40 Days on Jeepney TV and Kapamilya Channel
- October 28: Jay Leno's Garage (season 4) on TAP Sports
- October 30: The Formula on Heart of Asia
- October 30: Hoy, Love You Two on Kapamilya Channel
- November 3: Love in the Moonlight on GTV
- November 4: The Gifted: Graduation on Heart of Asia
- November 4: A Family Affair, Judy Abbott and Walang Hanggan (2012; rerun) on Jeepney TV
- November 4: A Family Affair on Kapamilya Channel
- November 5: Doble Kara (rerun) on Jeepney TV
- November 10: Nabi, My Stepdarling on GTV
- November 11: Boys Over Flowers (rerun) on Heart of Asia
- November 11: 2 Good 2 Be True (2G2BT) and Dyosa (rerun) on Jeepney TV
- November 11: 2 Good 2 Be True (2G2BT) on Kapamilya Channel
- November 12: Honesto (rerun) on Jeepney TV
- November 13: Sky Castle (rerun) on Heart of Asia
- November 13: Hoy, Love You 3 on Kapamilya Channel
- November 18: Backstreet Rookie on Heart of Asia
- November 19: Business Matters (season 9) on CNN Philippines
- November 20: Shakey's Super League on Solar Sports
- November 24: Wow Meganon on BuKo Channel
- November 25: Angel's Last Mission (rerun) on Heart of Asia
- November 25: Bagani and Meow: The Secret Boy (rerun) on Kapamilya Channel
- November 26: Oh My Job! (Dobol B TV) on GTV
- November 26: While You Were Sleeping (rerun) on Heart of Asia
- November 27: Detective Conan (season 8) and ONE Warrior Series: Philippines on GTV
- November 27: Lyric and Beat on Kapamilya Channel
- December 4: V-League on CNN Philippines
- December 9: Gokusen (season 3) on Heart of Asia
- December 9: Little Women II and The Promise of Forever (rerun) on Jeepney TV
- December 9: Wild Lands on Telenovela Channel
- December 10: A Beautiful Affair on Jeepney TV
- December 10: Maalaala Mo Kaya on Kapamilya Channel
- December 11: Click, Like, Share (season 3) on Kapamilya Channel
- December 11: Dr. Love Radio Show on TeleRadyo
- December 16: The Frog Prince on Heart of Asia
- December 16: Pieta (rerun) and The Blood Sisters (rerun) on Jeepney TV
- December 17: The Chosen One (season 1) on PIE Channel
- December 18: Fire of Eternal Love (rerun) and The Love Knot (rerun) on Heart of Asia
- December 23: Cityscape on ANC
- December 23: Beauty Boy and Start-Up PH on GTV
- December 23: Moon Embracing the Sun on Heart of Asia
- December 23: Sana Dalawa ang Puso (rerun) on Jeepney TV
- December 24: Love Actually (rerun) and Where Stars Land (rerun) on Heart of Asia
- December 24: Lakas ng Siyensya on TeleRadyo
- December 24: WWE SmackDown on One Sports+
- December 25: Angry Birds Stella on GTV
- December 25: Aladdin: You Would've Heard the Name (rerun) on Heart of Asia
- December 25: Mula sa Puso (2011; rerun) on Jeepney TV
- December 25: Kalye Kweens on Sari-Sari Channel
- December 27: WWE SmackDown on One Sports
- December 29: WWE Raw on One Sports
- December 30: Ghost Fighter on GTV
- December 30: Tale of the Nine Tailed on Heart of Asia
- December 30: Apoy sa Dagat (rerun) and My Little Juan on Jeepney TV
- December 30: Be My Lady on Kapamilya Channel
- December 30: Tuloy Po Kayo on One News and One PH
- December 31: Pororo the Little Penguin on Kapamilya Channel

==== Unknown ====
- Tina Monzon Palma Reports on ANC

==== Stopped airing ====
Program	Channel	Last airing	Resumed airing	Reason
News.PH (2nd incarnation)	CNN Philippines	January 7	January 24	Temporary suspension of broadcast due to the limitations caused by the implementation of health protocols in their broadcast center in Mandaluyong.
Newsroom Ngayon	CNN Philippines	January 7	January 24	Temporary suspension of broadcast due to the limitations caused by the implementation of health protocols in their broadcast center in Mandaluyong.
Sports Desk	CNN Philippines	January 7	January 24	Temporary suspension of broadcast due to the limitations caused by the implementation of health protocols in their broadcast center in Mandaluyong.
MBC Network News	DZRH TV	January 7	January 17	Temporary suspension of broadcast due to the limitations caused by the implementation of health protocols in their studio in Pasay.
K-Drama Special Stories	GTV	January 15	March 5	Series break.
K-Drama Special Stories	GTV	March 26	April 30	Pre-empted by the 97th season of National Collegiate Athletic Association.
K-Drama Special Stories	GTV	June 4	July 23	Pre-empted by the 97th season of National Collegiate Athletic Association.
Angry Birds Stella	GTV	January 16	February 6	Affected by the channel's programming schedule lineup changes.
G! Flicks (Saturday edition)	GTV	January 22	February 5	Pre-empted by the replay of The Jessica Soho Presidential Interviews.
The Big Picture	GTV	January 23	February 6	Pre-empted by the replay of The Jessica Soho Presidential Interviews.
Ipaglaban Mo!	Kapamilya Channel	January 30	April 10	Temporary suspension of broadcast due to the host's running as a candidate for a government position in the 2022 elections.
NBC Nightly News	TAP TV	January 30	April 18	Unknown.
Slam Dunk	GTV	February 25	April 25	Series break.
Feelings	One PH	March 18	April 2	Program transferred its timeslot due to the changes in programming schedule line-up.
Sine Date Weekends	GTV	March 20	May 15	Pre-empted by the 97th season of National Collegiate Athletic Association.
Sine Date Weekends	GTV	June 5	July 24	Pre-empted by the 97th season of National Collegiate Athletic Association.
Afternoon Movie Break	GTV	March 24	May 2	Pre-empted by the 97th season of National Collegiate Athletic Association.
Regal Treasures	GTV	March 25	May 6	Pre-empted by the 97th season of National Collegiate Athletic Association.
Regal Treasures	GTV	June 10	July 29	Pre-empted by the 97th season of National Collegiate Athletic Association.
The World Tonight	Kapamilya Channel	March 25	April 8	Pre-empted by the Harapan 22: ABS-CBN News Special.
The Big Picture	GTV	April 24	May 15	Pre-empted by the special programming which affected its schedule line-up.
Detective Conan (season 8)	GTV	April 24	September 1	Series break.
Hay, Bahay!	GTV	April 24	May 15	Pre-empted by the special programming which affected its schedule line-up.
Mag Badyet Tayo!	One PH	May 2	May 11	Pre-empted by the 2022 elections-related special programming.
Lingkod Kapamilya sa TeleRadyo	TeleRadyo	May 2	May 11	Pre-empted by the 2022 elections-related special programming.
Kapamilya Blockbusters	Kapamilya Channel	July 15	May 1, 2023	Program replaced by Tropang LOL on July 16.
My Sweet Lie (ETCerye)	SolarFlix	October 7	October 24	Mid-season break.

=== Video streaming services ===
- January 21: Quaranthings (season 2) on Upstream PH
- January 22: Saying Goodbye on IQiyi
- January 22: Happy Place on iWantTFC
- January 28: The Kangks Show on WeTV iflix
- February 2: Hello, Heart on IQiyi
- February 2: Click, Like, Share (season 3) on iWantTFC
- February 12: WWE 205 Live on WWE Network
- February 19: The Goodbye Girl on iWantTFC
- February 24: Love at the End of the World on GagaOOLala
- March 11: Dear God (season 1) on iWantTFC and KTX
- March 13: L and Lulu on VivaMax
- April 10: Bola Bola on iWantTFC
- April 30: Misis Piggy on iWantTFC
- May 8: The Seniors on VivaMax
- June 5: Gandara the BEKsplorer on VivaMax
- June 12: Gameboys (season 2) on KTX and VivaMax Plus
- June 12: Iskandalo on VivaMax
- June 24: How to Move On in 30 Days on YouTube (ABS-CBN Entertainment)
- June 25: Run to Me on iWantTFC
- July 24: High on Sex on VivaMax
- July 31: Beach Bros on iWantTFC
- August 3: He's Into Her (season 2) on iWantTFC
- August 27: Ang Babae Sa Likod ng Face Mask on YouTube (Puregold Channel)
- September 17: Coke Studio Philippines (season 6) on YouTube (Coke Studio Philippines)
- September 18: Wag Mong Agawin ang Akin on VivaMax
- September 23: Lyric and Beat on iWantTFC
- October 1: Kumusta Bro?: The Series on VivaMax Plus
- October 1: Boys After Dark on YouTube (Rise Artists Studios)
- October 7: Drag Race Philippines: Untucked! (season 1) on Discovery+, HBO Go and WOW Presents Plus
- October 7: Flower of Evil on Viu
- October 12: Drag Race Philippines (season 1) on Discovery+, HBO Go and WOW Presents Plus
- October 16: An/Na on Vivamax
- October 21: Hoy, Love You 3 on iWantTFC
- December 11: Secrets of a Nympho on VivaMax
- December 22: One Good Day on Amazon Prime Video

== Networks ==
The following are a list of free-to-air and cable channels or networks launches and closures in 2022.

=== Launches ===
Date	Station	Type	Channel	Source
January 6	beIN Sports 3 (2nd incarnation)	Cable and satellite	Cignal Channel 267 (HD) (Nationwide); Sky Cable Channel 205 (HD) (Metro Manila) / Channel 765 (HD) (Provincial)	
February 19	Global Trekker	Cable and satellite	Sky Cable Channel 200 (HD) (Metro Manila)	
April 1	Love Nature	Cable and satellite	Sky Cable Channel 192 (4K) (Metro Manila)	
May 9	IZTV	Broadcasting network	Channel 23 (digital feed); Sky Cable Channel 72 (Metro Manila)^{3}	
May 23	PIE Channel	Broadcasting channel	Channel 31 (digital feed); Sky Cable Channel 21 (Nationwide); Cablelink Channel 100 (Metro Manila); Cignal TV Channel 30 (Nationwide)^{4}	
September 13	All TV	Broadcasting network	Channel 2 (analog feed) / Channel 16/31 (digital feed); Cignal Channel 35 (Nationwide); G Sat Channel 32 (Nationwide); Sky Cable Channel 35 (Metro Manila, Bacolod^{2}, Iloilo^{3}, Cebu^{3}, Zamboanga^{2}, Davao^{2}) / Channel 31 (Baguio)^{3} / Channel 34 (Dumaguete, Gensan)^{4} Cablelink Channel 23 (Metro Manila); Planet Cable Channel 2 (Provincial)	
October 1	Comic U	FAST	TAP Go (streaming; Nationwide)	
October 1	Crime TV	FAST	TAP Go (streaming; Nationwide)	
October 1	Laff	FAST	TAP Go (streaming; Nationwide)	
October 1	Game Show Central	FAST	TAP Go (streaming; Nationwide)	
October 11	TVUP	Cable and satellite	Cignal Channel 101 (Nationwide)	
December 15	KBS Korea	Cable and satellite	Cignal Channel 174 (Nationwide); Sky Cable Channel 74 (Metro Manila)	

=== Rebranded ===
The following is a list of television stations or cable channels that have made or will make noteworthy network rebrands in 2022.

Date	Rebranded from	Rebranded to	Type	Channel	Source
January 10	Premier Tennis	Premier Sports 2	Cable and satellite	Cignal Channel 273 (HD) (Nationwide); Sky Cable Channel 264 (HD) (Metro Manila); Cablelink Channel 235 (HD) (Metro Manila)	
April 8	Hillsong Channel	TBN Inspire	Cable and satellite	Various cable providers	
May 16	TeleRadyo (remained as official name)	ABS-CBN TeleRadyo (stylized as on-air branding)	Broadcasting channel	Channel 20 (digital feed)^{6} Sky Cable Channel 26 (Metro Manila) / Channel 501 (Provincial)	
July 11	ETC (SBN)	Scream Flix	Cable and satellite	Various channel listings Cablelink Channel 34 (Metro Manila)^{7}	
July 11	ETC (SBN)	SolarFlix	Broadcasting network	Channel 21 (digital feed); Cignal Channel 21 (Nationwide); G Sat Channel 40 (Nationwide)^{8} SatLite Channel 21 (Nationwide); Sky Cable Channel 16 (Metro Manila) / Channel 17 (Provincial); Destiny Cable Channel 28 (analog) / Channel 16 (digital) (Metro Manila); Cablelink Channel 33 (Metro Manila)^{7} Vision Channel 40 (Metro Manila)	
September 1	MTV Asia (2nd incarnation)	MTV 90s	Cable and satellite	Cignal Channel 151 (Nationwide); SatLite Channel 110 (Nationwide); Sky Cable Channel 71 (Metro Manila) / Channel 642 (Provincial); Cablelink Channel 42 (Metro Manila)	
December 12	Rock Extreme	Rock Action	Cable and satellite	Cignal Channel 122 (Nationwide)^{1} G Sat Channel 32 (Nationwide); SatLite Channel 98 (Nationwide)^{1} Sky Cable Channel 104 (SD) / Channel 209 (HD) (Metro Manila) & Channel 223 (SD) / Channel 768 (HD) (Provincial); Cablelink Channel 36 (Metro Manila)	

=== Closures ===
Date	Station	Type	Channel	Sign-on debut	Source
January 1	Colours	Cable and satellite	Cignal Channel 60 (SD) / Channel 202 (HD) (Nationwide); SatLite Channel 40 (Nationwide)	May 5, 2012	
January 1	One Screen	Cable and satellite	Cignal Channel 9 (Nationwide); SatLite Channel 35 (Nationwide)	June 15, 2020	
April 1	WakuWaku Japan	Cable and satellite	Cignal Channel 172 (Nationwide)	April 5, 2021	
June 30	DepEd TV	Broadcasting service	Various channel and program listings GMA Affordabox Channel 7 (Metro Manila); Cignal Channel 149 (Nationwide); SatLite Channel 189 (Nationwide)	October 5, 2020	
July 18	LoveWorld Asia	Cable and satellite	Sky Cable Channel 207 (HD) (Metro Manila)	June 20, 2021	
October 1	H2	Cable and satellite	Cignal Channel 246 (HD) (Nationwide); Sky Cable Channel 202 (HD) (Metro Manila) / Channel 728 (HD) (Provincial); Cablelink Channel 310 (HD) (Metro Manila)	October 15, 2013	
October 1	Travelxp	Cable and satellite	Cablelink Channel 351 (HD) (Metro Manila)	October 1, 2021	

=== Stopped broadcasting ===
The following is a list of stations and channels or networks that have stopped broadcasting or (temporarily) off the air in 2022.

Station	Type	Channel	Last broadcasting	Resumed broadcasting	Reason	Source
IBC	Broadcasting network	Channel 13 (analog feed) / Channel 26 (digital feed); Cignal Channel 13 (Nationwide); G Sat Channel 2 (Nationwide); SatLite Channel 13 (Nationwide); Sky Cable / Destiny Cable Channel 15 (Metro Manila); Cablelink Channel 15 (Metro Manila); Vision Channel 15 (Metro Manila)	January 9	January 10	Temporary suspension of broadcasting due to the disinfection of their premises in Quezon City.	
CNN Philippines (RPN)	Broadcasting network	Channel 9 (analog feed) / Channel 19 (digital feed); Cignal Channel 10 (Nationwide); G Sat Channel 3 (Nationwide); SatLite Channel 9 (Nationwide); Sky Cable / Destiny Cable Channel 14 (Metro Manila); Cablelink Channel 14 (Metro Manila); Vision Channel 5 (Metro Manila)	January 10	January 11	Temporary suspension of broadcasting due to the limitations caused by the implementation of health protocols in their broadcast center in Mandaluyong, but the operations continue through online.	

- Notes
1. ^1: via Cignal and SatLite until December 23 as Rock Extreme
2. ^2: via Sky Cable since December 6
3. ^3: via Sky Cable since December 5
4. ^4: via Sky Cable since November 18
5. ^5: via Cablelink since circa September 19–25
6. ^6: via DTT from June 1 to October 31
7. ^7: via Cablelink until June 22 as ETC; since July 18 as SolarFlix
8. ^8: via G Sat until June 20 as ETC

== Services ==
The following are a list of television operators or providers and streaming media platforms or services launches and closures in 2022.

=== Launches ===
Date	Provider	Type	Stream	Source
March 10	SPOTV Now	VOD OTT streaming media platform	N/A	
May 23	PIE Channel	Multicasting	GCash (GLife); Website (PIE Channel); YouTube (PIE Channel)	
June 10	Lionsgate Play	VOD OTT streaming media platform	N/A	
June 20	Kapuso Stream	Multicasting	Facebook (GMA Network); TikTok (GMA Network); YouTube (GMANetwork)	
July 8	Jungo Pinoy	VOD OTT streaming media platform	N/A	
August 8	AQ Prime	VOD OTT streaming media platform	N/A	
August 8	Stream Together	Multicasting	YouTube (GMANetwork)	
October 24	Flex TV	VOD OTT streaming media platform	N/A	
November 17	Disney+	VOD OTT streaming media platform	N/A	
November	Setanta Sports	VOD OTT streaming media platform	N/A	

=== Rebranded ===
The following is a list of streaming providers that have made or will make noteworthy service rebrands in 2022.

Date	Rebranded from	Rebranded to	Type	Stream	Source
December 9	Smart GigaPlay	Smart LiveStream	VOD OTT streaming media platform	Website (Smart Communications)	

=== Stopped streaming ===
The following is a list of providers and platforms or services that have stopped operating or streaming in 2022.

Provider	Type	Stream	Last operating	Resumed operating	Reason	Source
Upstream PH	VOD OTT streaming media platform	N/A	August 31	N/A	Temporary suspension of operations due to their system maintenance.	

=== Closures ===
Date	Provider	Type	Stream	Sign-on debut	Source
November 30	WWE Network	VOD OTT streaming media platform (as a standalone service)	N/A (its entire content, including Premium Live Events, were transferred to Disney+ Philippines since November 17 prior to closure)	February 29, 2016	

== Deaths ==
January

- January 14 – Maoi Roca, (b. 1974), basketball player and actor.
- January 21 – Salvador Royales, (b. 1947), veteran writer and radio drama director of DZRH.
- January 23 – Romano Vasquez, (b. 1970), actor and former cast member of That's Entertainment.

February

- February 2 – Rustica Carpio, (b. 1930), veteran actress and playwright.
- February 15 – Dong Puno, (b. 1946), veteran broadcaster and former Press Secretary.
- February 21 – Eduardo Roy Jr., (b. 1980), director, producer and screenwriter.

March

- March 5 – Luz Fernandez, (b. 1935), veteran actress.
- March 17 – Bobby Nalzaro, (b. 1963), veteran regional broadcaster and columnist.

April

- April 7 – Carlos Salazar, (b. 1931), veteran actor and singer.
- April 16
  - Boyet Sison, (b. 1963), sportscaster and segment anchor of Alam N'yo Ba? on TV Patrol.
  - Gloria Sevilla, (b. 1932), film actress.
- April 23 – Florencio "Zaldy" Perez, (b. 1957), broadcaster and sportswriter.

May

- May 10 – Fanny Serrano, (b. 1948), celebrity makeup artist and stylist.
- May 15 – Miguel Faustmann, (b. 1954), theater actor.
- May 20 – Susan Roces, (b. 1941), veteran actress.

June

- June 9 – Mark Shandii Bacolod, (b. 1984), director, producer and talent manager.

July

- July 11 – Phillip Lazaro, (b. 1970), actor, comedian and director.
- July 22 – Carlos "Caloy" Alde, (b. 1961), actor and comedian.
- July 23 – Boy Alano, (b. 1941), actor.

August

- August 3 – Gladys Lana-Lucas, (b. 1960), radio host.
- August 5 – Cherie Gil, (b. 1963), actress.
- August 9 – Raissa Puno-Diaz, (b. 1977), broadcast journalist.
- August 10 – Reign André Loleng, (b. 1982), writer.
- August 13 – Melvyn "Panginoon" Calderon, (b. 1952), photojournalist and host of 'Wag Po!.
- August 17 – Danilo "Totong" Federez, (b. 1960), puppeteer and voice of Arn-arn on Unang Hirit.
- August 22 – Romy Suzara, (b. 1938), veteran director.
- August 24 – Ma. Clarissa "Ilsa" Reyes, (b. 1970), catholic media personality.

September

- September 13 – Vic Dimagiba, (b. 1949), former Undersecretary of Department of Trade and Industry and co-host of Konsyumer Atbp.
- September 16 – John Susi, (b. 1965), broadcaster of former DZXL 558 Manila, TV5, CLTV-36, GNN TV-44 Pampanga and 92.7 Brigada News FM Pampanga.

October

- October 3 – Percy Lapid, (b. 1959), journalist.
- October 31 – Danny Javier, (b. 1947), singer-songwriter and member of APO Hiking Society.

November

- November 19 – Flora Gasser, (b. 1932), veteran actress.

December

- December 1 – Sylvia La Torre, (b. 1933), singer and actress.
- December 9 – Jovit Baldivino, (b. 1993), singer and first grand champion winner of Pilipinas Got Talent (season 1).

== See also ==
- 2022 in television
