= Power 92 =

Power 92 or similar names may refer to:

- CKNG-FM, 92.5 at Edmonton, Alberta, Canada, formerly known as "Power 92" then "Power 92.5"
- CKIS-FM, 92.5 at Toronto, Ontario, Canada, formerly known as "Power 92".
- XHRM-FM, 92.5 at Tijuana, Baja California, Mexico, formerly known as "Power 92-5"
- DWCL, 92.3 at San Fernando, Pampanga, Philippines, in Central Luzon, formerly known as "Power 92.7"

United States

- KIPR, 92.3 MHz at Pine Bluff, Arkansas, in the Little Rock, Arkansas area
- KTAR-FM, 92.3 MHz at Glendale, Arizona, in the Phoenix area, formerly "Power 92" then "Power 92.3" with the callsign KKFR
- KREV (FM), 92.7 MHz at Alameda, California in the San Francisco area, formerly known as "Power 92.7" with the callsign KBTB
- WSGA (FM), 92.3 at Hinesville, Georgia, in the Savannah, Georgia area, formerly known as "Power 92" with the callsign WSKQ
- KSSK-FM, 92.3 MHz at Waipahu, Hawaii, in the Honolulu area, formerly known as "Power 92" with the callsign KXPW
- WPWX, 92.3 MHz at Hammond, Indiana, in the Chicago area
- WRPW, 92.9 MHz at Colfax, Illinois, in the Bloomington-Normal, Illinois area, and formerly known as "Power 92" then "Power 92.9"
- WZPW, 92.3 MHz at Peoria, Illinois, formerly known as "Power 92" then "Power 92.3"
- KBYO-FM, 92.7 MHz at Farmerville, Louisiana, in the Monroe, Louisiana area, known as "Power 92.7"
- WESE, 92.5 MHz at Guntown, Mississippi, in the Tupelo, Mississippi area
- WMSU, 92.1 MHz at Starkville, Mississippi, in the Columbus, Mississippi area, and known as "Power 92.1"
- KKMT, 92.3 MHz at Ronan, Montana, formerly known as "Power 92" with the callsign KQRK
- WZPR, 92.3 MHz at Nags Head, North Carolina in the Elizabeth City, North Carolina area, formerly known as "Power 92.3"
- KBMW-FM, 92.7 MHz at Kindred, North Dakota, in the Fargo-Moorhead area, formerly "Power 92" with the callsign KPHT
- KSSU (FM), 91.9 MHz at Southeastern Oklahoma State University, in Durant, Oklahoma
- WCAL, 91.9 MHz at California University of Pennsylvania, in California, Pennsylvania, a college radio station
- WJHT, 92.1 MHz at Johnstown, Pennsylvania, formerly known as "Power 92" with the callsign WGLU
