= KSSU =

KSSU may refer to:

- KSSU aircraft maintenance consortium (KLM, Swissair, SAS and UTA); see Union de Transports Aériens
- KSSU (AM), the internet radio station of California State University, Sacramento
- KSSU (FM), a radio station (91.9 FM) licensed to Durant, Oklahoma, United States
- Kirby Super Star Ultra, a Nintendo DS video game
