= Myx Hits Different =

Music television and web series

- Genre: Music television Variety
- No. of seasons: 3

Production
- Camera setup: Multiple-camera setup
- Running time: 30 minutes

Original release
- Network: Myx Global
- Release: September 8, 2022 – present

Myx Hits Different is a music television and web series broadcast by Myx Global. Premiered in September 2022, it features live performances, interviews, and lifestyle segments from emerging and established Filipino artists.

The series is streaming online on YouTube and Myx Global official website.

== Premise ==
Myx Hits Different features Filipino musicians performing in everyday locations outside traditional studio settings, such as cafés, barbershops, grocery stores, and auto shops. According to Myx, the program aims to showcase the next generation of Filipino artists to global audiences through music and storytelling.

== Seasons ==
=== Season 1 ===
The first season premiered in September 2022 with 13 half-hour episodes featuring emerging Filipino artists. Among the artists featured during the inaugural season were Ace Banzuelo, Paolo Sandejas, the cast of Lyric and Beat, Nobita, Young Cocoa, Bini, BGYO, Syd Hartha, Denise Julia, Shanaia Gomez, Marlo Mortel, and Litz.

=== Season 2 ===
The second season first premiered on July 14, 2023 on www.myx.global. The second season featured artists including Dilaw, John Roa, Maymay Entrata, Jeff Grecia, Ken San Jose, Angela Ken, and Alamat. According to Myx head of content and programming Nino Llanera, the featured performers were selected to represent multiple music genres and present a broader range of contemporary Filipino music.

=== Season 3 ===
The third season first premiered on May 22, 2024, on Myx's YouTube channel before its broadcast on its cable channel on May 25 for a replay. Unlike the previous season, the third installment centered on the growing P-pop movement in the Philippines, featuring artists such as Josh Cullen, Pablo, Bini, BGYO, YARA, 1st One, DIONE, and Press Hit Play. The third season was opened by Josh Cullen, who is the feature for the season's pilot episode.

== Release ==
The first season of Myx Hits Different premiered on September 8, 2022, through Myx's digital platforms and the network's U.S. feed. In the Philippines, episodes were subsequently broadcast every Saturday on the Myx cable channel as part of the network's weekend programming.
