= Cablelink =

Philippine broadband service and cable provider

- Company type: Private
- Founded: 1995; 31 years ago
- Area served: Metro Manila, Philippines
- Services: Cable television, broadband internet
- Owner: Cable Link & Holdings Corp.
- Website: cablelink.com.ph

Cablelink (formerly known as Conception Pay TV Network) is a subscription-based cable antenna television system operator and broadband Internet service provider in the Philippines which commenced its CATV operation in 1995. It is owned and operated by Cable Link and Holdings Corporation. Currently, it operates in the southern part of Metropolitan Manila, specifically in the areas of Las Piñas, Parañaque City, Muntinlupa, Pasig, Pasay, Mandaluyong, Manila, San Juan, Pateros, Taguig, Cavite (Imus, Bacoor), Laguna (Binan, Santa Rosa), Tarlac (Concepcion), Bulacan (Santa Maria), and some parts in Quezon City (Damayan, Saint Peter and Santa Teresita) In September 2004, Cablelink introduced its own high-speed cable Internet known as i-Blaze Cable Internet.
