= Amor de madre =

- Genre: Telenovela
- Created by: Víctor Falcón; Eduardo Adrianzén
- Written by: Silvina Frejdkes; Keyber Rojas; Alejandro Quesada
- Directed by: Francisco Álvarez
- Starring: Pierina Carcelén; David Villanueva; Stefano Salvini; Vanessa Saba; Tula Rodríguez; Jimena Lindo; Alexandra Graña; Vania Accinelli; Mariano García-Rosell; Maria Grazia Gamarra; Andrea Luna; Luis Jose Ocampo
- Opening theme: Amor de madre by Max Castro
- Country of origin: Peru
- Original language: Spanish
- No. of episodes: 74

Production
- Executive producer: Andrea Álvarez
- Producer: Michelle Alexander
- Running time: 60 minutes
- Production company: Del Barrio Producciones

Original release
- Network: América Televisión
- Release: 10 August – 20 November 2015

Amor de madre (lit. "Mother's Love") is a Peruvian telenovela produced by Michelle Alexander and broadcast by América Televisión from 10 August to 20 November 2015.

== Cast ==
- Pierina Carcelén as Clara Porras Quispe
- Vanessa Saba as María Eduarda Vda de Bérmudez
- Jimena Lindo as Alicia Tapia Mendoza de Córdova
- Alexandra Graña as Ofelia Tapia Mendoza
- Tula Rodríguez as Yoliruth Cárdenas
- Stefano Salvini as Hugo Osorio Porras / Ángel Hidalgo
- David Villanueva as Iván Hidalgo Lozano
- Gonzalo Molina as Raúl Córdova Suárez
- Rodrigo Sánchez Patiño sa Otoniel Camacho Tirado
- André Silva as Giovanni Choque Salvatierra
- Maria Grazia Gamarra as Camila Bérmudez
- Andrea Luna as Lucía Bérmudez
- Emanuel Soriano as Tadeo Córdova Tapia
- Vania Accinelli as Sara Osorio Porras "Sarita"
- Silvana Cañote as Lizbeth Córdova Tapia
- Mariano García-Rosell as Cipriano Osorio Porras
- Pold Gastello as Igor Trelles Talledo
- Irene Eyzaguirre as Dumancia
- Amparo Brambilla as Madame Collete
- Anaí Padilla as Mafalda "Mishka"
- Alana La Madrid as Paloma
- Alberick García as Roberto Osorio Chauca "Tito"
- Renato Bonifaz as Pablo "El Griego"
- Andrea Fernández as Commander Cecilia Peralta Ruíz
- Fiorella Díaz as Esther Benavides de Souza
- Enrique Victoria as Alcídes "Gavilán"
- Mariella Zanetti as Josefina Barraza Terrones
- Diego Lombardi as Gonzalo Souza
- Emilia Drago as Carolina
- Gustavo Mac Lennan as Dr. Remigio Beraún
- Zoe Arévalo as Stephanie Souza Benavides
- Dante del Águila as Kelvin
- Ingrid Altamirano as Silvana
- Daniella Pflucker as Alexa
- Bruno Espejo as Mauro
- Luis José Ocampo as Fernandinho
- Lucía Carlín as Madeleine
- Fernando Fermor as Roberto
- Sandra Bernasconi as Olinda
- Miguel Ángel Álvarez as Alberto
- Homero Cristalli as Ramiro
- Thiago Basurto as Hugo Osorio Porras (child)
- Francisca Aronsson as Camila Bermúdez (child)
- Salvador del Solar as Esteban Bérmudez
