= Counterpoint with Secretary Salvador Panelo =

Filipino public affairs talk show

- Also known as: Counterpoint with Salvador Panelo
- Genre: Public affairs; Talk show
- Created by: Salvador Panelo
- Presented by: Salvador Panelo
- Country of origin: Philippines
- Original languages: English, Filipino
- No. of episodes: 17

Production
- Production locations: IBC 13 Studio Broadcast City, Quezon City (2008–10); New Executive Building, Malacañang (2020–21); EBC Bldg., #25 Central Avenue, New Era, Quezon City, Philippines (2022–24)
- Running time: 18–65 minutes
- Production companies: IBC News and Public Affairs (2008–10); Presidential Broadcast Staff - Radio Television Malacañang (2020–21); Eagle Broadcasting Corporation (2022–24)

Original release
- Network: IBC (2008–10); PTV (2020–21); NET25 (2022–24)
- Release: October 29, 2008 – September 25, 2024

Related
- Bagong Pilipinas Afternoon Edition

Counterpoint with Secretary Salvador Panelo is a Philippine television public affairs show broadcast by IBC, PTV and NET25. Hosted by Salvador Panelo, it aired on IBC from October 29, 2008 to 2010. The show moved to PTV from May 1, 2020 to September 24, 2021, replacing Bagong Pilipinas: Afternoon Edition and NET25 from August 31, 2022 to September 25, 2024. Initially produced by the Presidential Broadcast Staff - Radio Television Malacañang for the People's Television Network (PTV), the program was used to be a platform for voicing Panelo's arguments for and defense of the actions taken by the government under then-President Rodrigo Duterte.

== Background ==
In October 2018, Salvador Panelo replaced Harry Roque as the Presidential Spokesperson of Rodrigo Duterte, as Roque aimed to run for congress in the 2019 midterm election. In 2020, as the COVID-19 pandemic became a threat the Philippines and forced President Duterte to declare an enhanced community quarantine for the entire Luzon area, he reappointed Roque as Presidential Spokesperson on April 13, with Panelo explaining that the crisis "requires a new task in messaging."

== Production and airing ==
Counterpoint was created by Panelo as a new platform for "discussing the issues affecting our country", as well as "analyze, dissect issues raised by certain critics and others against certain policies of the government". Shot at the New Executive Building of Malacañang, the program began airing on PTV in the Philippines on May 1, 2020, and is simultaneously broadcast on social media pages of the Philippine government. Each episode is subsequently posted on YouTube after broadcast by the RTVMalacañang. The show ended its broadcast on September 24, 2021, weeks before he resigned as the Chief Presidential Legal Counsel and subsequently filed for candidacy for the 2022 Senatorial election.

On August 31, 2022, Counterpoint returned to television following Panelo's election defeat, airing on NET25, a free-to-air and cable television network owned by Iglesia ni Cristo's affiliate Eagle Broadcasting Corporation. The show airs every Wednesday at 10:30 PM (PST).

=== Controversies ===
Panelo's remarks from the program's May 4 episode, which described the COVID-19 pandemic as potentially an "invasion" and grounds for martial law, was criticized by the National Union of Peoples' Lawyers as "constitutionally preposterous" and led Harry Roque to announce that Duterte disagrees with Panelo's position. Panelo later clarified that his remarks were for the purpose of a "theoretical discussion".
