= The Best Ka! =

2022 Philippine television comedy infotainment show

- Genre: Comedy; Infotainment
- Directed by: Tata Betita
- Presented by: Mikael Daez
- Country of origin: Philippines
- Original language: Tagalog

Production
- Camera setup: Multiple-camera setup
- Running time: 65 minutes
- Production company: GMA Entertainment Group

Original release
- Network: GMA Network
- Release: February 20 – June 5, 2022

The Best Ka! (transl. you're the best!) is a Philippine television comedy infotainment show broadcast by GMA Network. Hosted by Mikael Daez, it premiered on February 20, 2022 on the network's Sunday Grande sa Hapon line up. The show concluded on June 5, 2022.

== Premise ==
The show spotlights the world's most unique, bizarre, and record-breaking human achievements with comedy and amazing facts by featuring both international Guinness World Records' "Best of the Best" and incredible local Filipino talents.

== Host ==
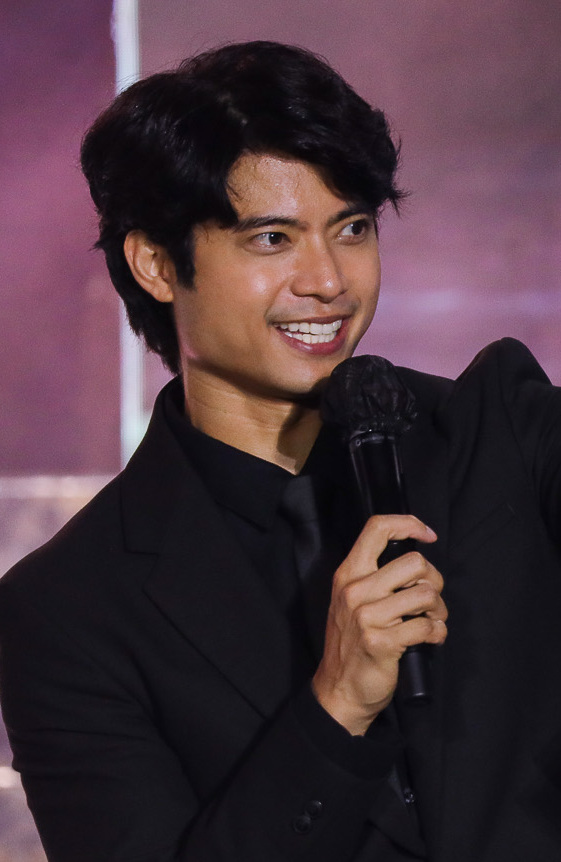
Mikael Daez served as the host.

- Mikael Daez

Guest co-host

- Jo Berry

== Ratings ==
Based on preliminary/overnight data by Nielsen Philippines' Television Audience Measurement Nationwide Urban Television Audience Measurement, the pilot episode of The Best Ka! earned a 5.1% rating.
