= DWCL =

Radio station in Pampanga, Philippines

- San Fernando; Philippines
- Broadcast area: Pampanga and surrounding areas
- Frequency: 92.7 MHz

Programming
- Format: Silent

Ownership
- Owner: UBC Media

History
- First air date: 1987
- Last air date: 2025
- Former names: Power 92.7 (1987-2015); Brigada News FM (2015-2025); ORFM (2025)
- Call sign meaning: Central Luzon

Technical information
- Licensing authority: NTC

DWCL (92.7 FM) was a radio station owned by UBC Media (Love Radio Network).

== History ==
The station started operations in 1987 as Power 92.7, airing Christian Music. Under UBC's direct ownership, the radio station gained a sister television outlet, which lasted until 2009 when UBC 12 went off-air due to financial losses and intense competition with CLTV 36. Power 92.7 also served as the flagship for UBC's religious program, "One God, One Nation".

In May 2015, Brigada Mass Media Corporation took over the station's operations, initially serving as a relay of 104.7 Brigada News FM based in Manila. On September 14, 2015, it was launched as Brigada News FM Pampanga-Central Luzon with its own local programming. Among the station's roster of personalities were John Susi, Max Sangil, and Alvin Masangkay (known on-air as John Ericsson). As part of the airtime lease agreement, UBC retained an hour of its own programming for "One God, One Nation", which aired on Sunday evenings, syndicated to Brigada News FM stations in Luzon.

By 2016, 92.7 Pampanga became one of Brigada News FM's five "network-feeder" stations through its program Brigada Lovelines with John Ericsson.

In July 2023, due to the impending expiry of its airtime lease with UBC and struggling sales of BMMC's health products in Pampanga, the station was downgraded back to a relay of 105.1 Brigada News FM based in Manila. In the immediate aftermath, most of its remaining on-air staff, including Honey Ragot and Jo Salazar, transferred to Newsline 103.1 FM. On September 8, 2025, the frequency went off the air after a couple of months reminding listeners to switch to the said originating station.

In October 2025, Oriental Mindoro-based Rabino Broadcasting and Advertising Services took over 92.7 FM's operations and conducted a series of test broadcasts. On December 1, it was launched as 92.7 ORFM. However, Rabino's management aborted broadcasts the very next day due to issues surrounding UBC Media's legislative broadcast franchise that expired on May 9, 2026, leaving the frequency off the air.
