= KSSU (FM) =

Radio station at Southeastern Oklahoma State University in Durant, Oklahoma

- Durant, Oklahoma; United States
- Frequency: 91.9 MHz

Programming
- Format: contemporary hit radio

Ownership
- Owner: Southeastern Oklahoma State University

Technical information
- Licensing authority: FCC
- Facility ID: 61233
- Class: A
- ERP: 3,200 watts
- HAAT: 106.0 meters
- Transmitter coordinates: 34°00′45″N 96°19′45″W

Links
- Public license information: Public file; LMS
- Webcast: Listen Live
- Website: Official Website

KSSU (91.9 FM) is a radio station broadcasting a contemporary hit radio format. Licensed to Durant, Oklahoma, United States, the station is owned by Southeastern Oklahoma State University.
