= List of programs broadcast by BEAM TV =

This is a list of programs broadcast on BEAM TV.

It was previously known as CTV-31 (Cinema Television) on October 31, 1993, and E! Philippines on October 2000. However, it was defunct on June 1, 2003 due to low ratings and high cost programming difficulties.

== Current programs ==
=== News ===
- Bilyonaryo News Channel
- PRTV Prime Media
  - DZMM TeleRadyo (2025–present)
  - TV Patrol (2024–present; simulcast with A2Z, All TV, ANC, Kapamilya Channel, DZMM TeleRadyo, DZMM Radyo Patrol 630 and FMR Stations Nationwide)
  - TV Patrol Weekend (2024–present; simulcast with A2Z, All TV, ANC, Kapamilya Channel, DZMM TeleRadyo, DZMM Radyo Patrol 630 and FMR Stations Nationwide)

=== Educational ===
- Knowledge Channel

=== Infotainment ===
- D8TV

== Previous programs ==
=== CTV-31/E! Philippines Channel 31 era ===
- 3rd Rock from the Sun
- Academy Awards Attractions
- Adventure Cinema Theater
- Airwolf
- Bad Movies We Love
- Baywatch
- Behind the Scenes
- CBS Evening News (2000–2003)
- Celebrity Homes
- Coming Attractions
- Cowboys and Indians
- CTV Goes to Oscars
- Drive-In Theater
- E! Features
- E! News Daily
- E! News Week in Review
- E! True Hollywood Story
- Eto Rangers
- Fashion Emergency
- FYE!
- Hilarious Attractions
- Hope Hollywood Original Treasures
- Ibang Klasik Ito
- Iskul Bukol
- Larry King Live (CNN)
- Late Show with David Letterman (CBS)
- Matinee Classics
- Midnight Movie Spectaculars
- Mission: Impossible
- MVP on CTV
- Mysteries and Scandals
- Nestle Hollywood Romances
- On Broadway
- Once Upon a Movie Time
- Our Favorite Movies
- Pictures Of War
- PLDT Family Movie
- Premiere Night
- Revealed with Jules Asner
- Sabado Nights at the Movies
- Showcase of Suspense
- Spy Network
- SRO TV
- Starstruck Presents
- Studio 101: Freeway to the Stars
- Talk Soup
- That's All Toons
- The Crystal Maze
- The Gossip Show
- The PLDT Premiere Theater
- The Rat Patrol
- The Twilight Zone
- Tom & Jerry
- Tuesday's Hilarious Attractions
- Wild On! (2000–2003)
- Wild On! Philippines (2000–2003)
- Wild Wild Westerns
- World News Tonight with Peter Jennings (ABC)

=== As BEAM TV ===
==== BEAM Channel 31 on test broadcast ====
- 2008 Beijing Olympics: Volleyball Men's Edition

==== The Game Channel on BEAM Channel 31 ====
- America's Got Talent
- Dance Your Ass Off
- Family Game Night
- Jeopardy!
- Minute to Win It
- RPN NewsWatch¹
- RPN NewsCap¹
- Survivor: Redemption Island
- Survivor: South Pacific
- The Biggest Loser season 7
- The Price Is Right
- Wheel of Fortune

¹RPN programs, both were continued to air on the said original channel after the channel (BEAM TV) axed simulcasting both producing newscasts from original channel in October 2011 until October 29, 2012.

==== Blocktimers ====
- A Woman's Word (May 4–November 20, 2015)
- All TV (2022–23)
- Big Love (2015–16)
- Blast Sports (2024–25)
- DepEd TV on BEAM TV (2021–22)
- EZ Shop on BEAM (2015–20)
- Great Day to Live with Bro. Greg Durante (2014–16)
- Inquirer 990 Television on BEAM TV (2016–20)
- La Madrastra (May 4–October 16, 2015)
- Life TV (2016–25)
- Love Spell (2015–16)
- Muchacha Italiana (2015–16)
- O Shopping on BEAM TV (2014–18)
- PIE (2022–23)
- Pilipinas HD (2016–25)
- Prime TV/PRTV Prime Media (2024–present)
  - TeleRadyo Serbisyo (2024–25)
  - Arangkada Balita (2025–2026)
- Shop Japan (2015–18)
- Shop TV (2016–18)
- TBN Asia on BEAM TV (2014–15)
- Telenovela Channel on BEAM TV (March 1–2, 2015)
- The 700 Club Asia on BEAM TV (2013–16)
- TV Shop Philippines (2015–23)
- The Two Sides of Ana (2016)
- UFC TV (2025–26)

== See also ==
- Broadcast Enterprises and Affiliated Media
- Radio Mindanao Network
