= DYCT-DTV =

- Metro Cebu; Philippines
- City: Cebu City
- Channels: Digital: 31 (UHF) (ISDB-T); Virtual: 31.01

Programming
- Subchannels: See list of subchannels
- Affiliations: 31.1: PRTV Prime Media; 31.2: UFC TV; 31.3: Knowledge Channel; 31.4: RESERVED; 31.5: Bilyonaryo News Channel; 31.6: D8TV

Ownership
- Owner: Broadcast Enterprises and Affiliated Media Inc.

History
- Founded: 1993 (RMN TV); July 3, 2011 (BEAM); May 27, 2024 (Prime TV)
- Former call signs: DYCT-TV (1993-2003, 2011-2022)
- Former channel numbers: Analog: 31 (UHF, 1993–2003, 2011-2022); Digital: 32 (UHF, 2016–2022)
- Former affiliations: CTV 31 (1993-2000); E! Entertainment (2000-2003); Silent (2003-2011); The Game Channel (2011-2012); CHASE (2011-2012); Jack CITY (2012-2014); BEAM TV (2014-2021); Shop TV (2016-2018); Pop Life TV/Pop Life Lite (2019); Inquirer 990 TV (2020); PIE (2021-2023); ALLTV (2022-2024)
- Call sign meaning: DY; Cinema; Television (former branding)

Technical information
- Licensing authority: NTC
- Power: 5 kW TPO
- ERP: 25 kW ERP

Links
- Website: www.beam.com.ph

DYCT-DTV (channel 31) is a television station in Metro Cebu, Philippines, serving as the Visayas flagship of Broadcast Enterprises and Affiliated Media, Inc.. The station maintains a transmitter facility at Babag Hills, Cebu City.

== History ==
It was started as Cinema Television (or CTV-31) in 1993. It was also the first UHF station. In 1997, it had its broadcast rights form E!, an American-cable network channel that features fashion and lifestyle show, later known as E! Philippines. In 2003 however, RMN decided to cancel its operations for the TV network, citing financial constraints and poor ratings.

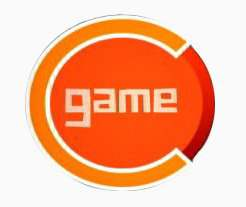
Logo of The Game Channel from August 15, 2011-February 15, 2012

On July 3, 2011, UHF 31 in Cebu and all RMN TV stations nationwide returned as a test broadcast, as the frequency was occupied by Broadcast Enterprises and Affiliated Media, following the latter was bought up by Bethlehem Holdings, Inc. (funded by Globe Telecom's Group Retirement Fund) from RMN. And then on, it was branded as BEAM Channel 31 and The Game Channel on August 15, 2011. Recently, The Game Channel limited to its broadcast on December 24, 2011, to give way to its new sister station CHASE which it was broadcast in evening block of The Game Channel. Recently, The Game Channel leased its operation on BEAM and transferred its operation to cable, while CHASE remains on this network and took its 24-hour broadcast. Recently, it ended its operation on October 19, 2012.

On September 7, 2012, when they aired 24 on CHASE, an animation signage plugged and written like this: "Another Jack TV is rising, coming soon on this channel". This was the part of Solar TV Network, Inc. plans to use this channel assignment to air the said network. The network was planned and it was launched as the secondary Jack TV network named Jack City on October 20, 2012. But it lessened its on air limits on free TV to 18 hours a day, due to National Telecommunications Commission's guidelines on free-to-air broadcasters, however it continues broadcasting 24/7 on cable networks. Somehow it ended operations and affiliation partnership with BEAM on September 1, 2014, and was moved to cable networks. BEAM Channel 31 Cebu, along with other BEAM TV stations nationwide was an affiliated with Essentials Broadcasting Network thru TBN Asia and O Shopping (an ABS-CBN-owned shopping network channel).

BEAM TV provincial stations ceased its analog transmission on March 29, 2022 (3 months after BEAM TV 31 Manila closed down its analog signal for the second time on January 1, 2022), as its now fully migrated to digital broadcast permanently. As of March 30, 2022 (a day after its analog shutdown), BEAM TV Digital broadcast started to operate on UHF 31, but still under maintenance as the network still trying to migrate its signal operations which is currently using the digital transmission on UHF 32 in the area. On April 6, 2022, BEAM TV announced launched of PIE, a new channel that co-ownership with ABS-CBN Corporation, Kroma Entertainment and 917Ventures, on May 23, 2022 as the all-new "tradigital" entertainment channel.

== Digital television ==
=== Digital channels ===
DYCT-TV currently operates on UHF Channel 31 (575.143 MHz) and is multiplexed into the following subchannels:

Channel	Video	Aspect	Short name	Programming	Notes
31.1	480i	16:9	PRTV PRIME	PRTV Prime Media	Commercial broadcast
31.2	480i	16:9	UFC TV	UFC TV	Commercial broadcast
31.3	480i	16:9	KNOWLEDGE CHANNEL	Knowledge Channel	Commercial broadcast
31.4	480i	16:9	RESERVED	SMPTE Color Bars	Test broadcast
31.5	480i	16:9	BILYONARYO NEWS CHANNEL	Bilyonaryo News Channel	Commercial broadcast
31.6	480i	16:9	D8TV	D8TV	Commercial broadcast

== Areas of coverage ==
=== Primary areas ===
- Cebu City
- Cebu

==== Secondary areas ====
- Portion of Bohol
- Portion of Leyte
- Portion of Negros Oriental
