= DWHC-DTV =

- Naga City, Camarines Sur; Philippines
- Channels: Digital: 32 (UHF) (ISDB-T) (test broadcast); Virtual: 32.01

Programming
- Subchannels: See list of subchannels
- Affiliations: 32.2: Blast Sports; 32.3: Knowledge Channel; 32.4: Reserved; 32.6: Life TV; 32.7: D8TV

Ownership
- Owner: Broadcast Enterprises and Affiliated Media Inc.

History
- Founded: 1990s (CTV-31); July 3, 2011 (BEAM)
- Former call signs: DWHP-TV (1990s-1999); DWHC-TV (1999-2003, 2011-2021)
- Former channel numbers: Analog: 32 (UHF, 1990s–2003, 2011-2021); Digital: 35 (UHF, 2014–2022)
- Former affiliations: Cinema Television (CTV) (1990s-2000); E! Philippines (2000-2003); Silent (2003-2011); The Game Channel (2011-2012); CHASE (2011-2012); Jack City (2012-2014); Independent (2014-2021)

Technical information
- Licensing authority: NTC
- Power: 5 kW TPO
- ERP: 25 kW ERP

Links
- Website: http://www.beam.com.ph/

DWHC-DTV (channel 32) is a television station in Naga City, Camarines Sur, Philippines, owned and operated by Broadcast Enterprises and Affiliated Media, Inc. The station maintains a transmitter facility at Globe Cellsite, Roxas Avenue, Brgy. Triangulo, Naga City.

== History ==
=== As CTV-32 Naga ===
Sometimes in the 1990s, Radio Mindanao Network became the second radio-based network to launch a TV station called Cinema Television 32 (CTV-32). An all-movie channel, its programming included a presentation of Filipino and Hollywood movies respectively, and programs from E!, an American cable channel. It is the first UHF station to be inspired by the format of a cable movie channel.

However, because of the broadcasting rules assigned by National Telecommunications Commission and the matter that they acquired the broadcast rights from E!, CTV-32 stopped its broadcast in September 2000.

=== As E! Philippines 32 and ceased transmission ===
E!31 logo from 2000 to 2003

In October 2000, E! and RMN announced its partnership to relaunch CTV into E! Philippines, with its broadcasting extended into 24 hours. But in 2001, it reduced its broadcasts into 6 primetime-hours, from 6:00 PM to 12:00 MN. Some of E!'s programs were brought to the Philippines and remade in a local version, one of which was Wild On! Philippines. However on June 1, 2003, RMN decided to cease their operations on TV due to financial constraints and poor television ratings, and somehow to focus only on their radio network in Naga (namely Radyo Mo Nationwide 91.1 FM Naga). There were several religious groups who had wished to acquire block programming of E! Philippines, but RMN refused to accept their offers.

=== As BEAM Channel 32 Naga City ===
==== Initial Broadcast & The Game Channel ====
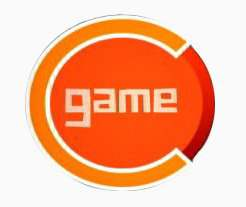
Logo of The Game Channel from August 15, 2011-February 15, 2012. The logo continues to use until August 13, 2012 on cable network.

After 8 years of being silent in Naga City, Camarines Sur television, on July 3, 2011, UHF 32 returned its operations as a test broadcast. The station (along with other RMN-owned UHF stations nationwide) was occupied by Broadcast Enterprises and Affiliated Media, after the latter bought up the acquisition by Bethlehem Holdings, Inc. (funded by Globe Telecom's Group Retirement Fund) from RMN. And as the first broadcast TV operations under new ownership, BEAM began its affiliation partnership with Solar Entertainment Corporation.

The network was branded on July 13 as BEAM Channel 32. On August 15, 2011, it started its initial broadcast carrying The Game Channel. However, on December 24, The Game Channel limited its broadcast every morning and afternoon, to give way to its new sister network station CHASE, which is used its evening block.

==== CHASE Channel ====
In the later part of February 2012, while CHASE started its programming at night, there was an investigator notebook that appear on the lower-left of the TV screen saying that "CHASE goes 24". After that event, on February 15, 2012, after its 7 months of broadcasting on BEAM Channel 32 Naga, The Game Channel bid goodbye to the viewers and moved its operations on Global Destiny Cable (now Destiny Cable, owned by Sky Cable Corporation, which currently aired on Channel 89 in Metro Manila), while CHASE remained on this channel and took its 24-hour permanent broadcast. It ended its operation on October 19, 2012.

==== Jack City ====
On September 7, 2012, when they aired 24 on CHASE, an animation signage plugged and written like this: "Another Jack TV is rising, coming soon on this channel". This was the part of Solar TV Network, Inc. plans to use this channel assignment to air the said network. The network is planned and it was launched as the secondary Jack TV network named Jack CITY on October 20, 2012.CHASE ended its operation on October 19, 2012, although some of its programs were still carried over by this channel. The full broadcast was initiated on November 11, 2012. The main reason for reformatting and rebranding is that CHASE is too male-centric. But on June 28, 2013, BEAM 32 Naga (along with other BEAM stations) limited their operations to 18 hours a day (from 7:00 AM to 12:00 midnight) due to rules and regulations on free-to-air stations assigned by National Telecommunications Commission, however it continues broadcast 24/7 on cable networks. On August 31, 2014, Jack CITY ended its partnership with BEAM as they have decided to move to cable stations nationwide as BEAM prepares its digital transition.

==== Blocktiming hours ====
As BEAM prepares for the digital television era and Jack City continues to broadcast on cable networks until March 21, 2015, when the channel were rebranded as CT; it started aired O Shopping (of ABS-CBN Corporation and CJ Group of Korea, which aired at that time on the network's mother company (ABS-CBN, which already aired on that area on TV-11) every late night slots, and 24/7 on SkyCable (only available on digital platform, but the area still remains as an analog platform service, although it already covered and served)) and several programs from TBN Asia such as Great Day to Live, Ang Tugon, among other local and religious programming produced by the Essential Broadcasting Network under the leadership of Bro. Greg Durante of Greg Durante Ministries which its started from its regular signing-on on September 1, 2014.

Between March and summer of 2015, the channel also continues increased more blocktiming hours and programming (it contains religious and home shopping programs, as well as telenovelas; in line with other BEAM stations). Notable blocktimers added at that time include: TVShoppe (also known as 'revival' of Value Vision) and Shop Japan.

In preparation for their full migration to digital broadcast, BEAM TV announced that they will discontinue their broadcast on analog after 10 years for the second time on January 1, 2022, hence, they're the fourth broadcaster to shift in full digital operations to do so. BEAM TV on analog telecast made its final sign-off appearance on December 31, 2021, as the station was now fully migrated to digital broadcast only. As of January 18, 2022 (18 days later, after its analog shutdown), BEAM TV Digital broadcast started to operate on UHF 32, but still under maintenance as the network still trying to migrate its signal operations which is currently using the digital transmission on UHF 35 in the area.

=== As PIE Channel 32 Naga ===
On April 6, 2022, BEAM announced its co-ownership with ABS-CBN Corporation, Kroma Entertainment and 917Ventures for its launching of Pinoy Interactive Entertainment or PIE, with ABS-CBN served as its main content production provider while Kroma Entertainment as its technological innovative interaction format backed by 917Ventures. The channel started its test broadcast on April 25, 2022, showcasing unprompted daily questions each day until May 15, followed by a seven-day "Countdown to TagumPIE" special day on May 16–22, and made its official launch on May 23, 2022.

== Digital television ==
=== Digital channels ===
DWHC-DTV currently operates on UHF Channel 32 (581.143 MHz) and is multiplexed into the following subchannels:

Channel	Video	Aspect	Short name	Programming	Notes
32.1	480i	16:9	PRIME TV	Prime TV	Commercial broadcast
32.2	480i	16:9	BLAST SPORTS	Blast Sports	Commercial broadcast
32.3	480i	4:3	KNOWLEDGE CHANNEL	Knowledge Channel	Commercial broadcast
32.4	480i	4:3	BILYONARYO NEWS CHANNEL	Bilyonaryo News Channel	Commercial broadcast
32.5	480i	4:3	MOVIE CENTRAL	Movie Central	Commercial broadcast
32.6	480i	4:3	LIFE TV	Life TV	Commercial broadcast
32.7	480i	16:9	D8TV	D8TV	Commercial broadcast

== Area of coverage ==
- Naga City
- Camarines Sur
- Portion of Camarines Norte
