= DXBE-DTV =

- Zamboanga City; Philippines
- Channels: Digital: 31 (UHF/under test broadcast) (ISDB-T); Virtual: 31.01

Programming
- Subchannels: See list of subchannels
- Affiliations: 31.1: PRTV Prime Media; 31.2: UFC TV; 31.3: Knowledge Channel; 31.4: RESERVED; 31.5: Bilyonaryo News Channel; 31.6: D8TV

Ownership
- Owner: Broadcast Enterprises and Affiliated Media Inc.

History
- Founded: 1995 (RMN TV); July 3, 2011 (BEAM TV)
- Former call signs: DXBE-TV (1995-2003, 2011-2021)
- Former channel numbers: Analog: 31 (UHF, 1995–2003, 2011-2021)
- Former affiliations: CTV 31 (1995-2000); E! Entertainment (2000-2003); Silent (2003-2011); The Game Channel (2011-2012); CHASE (2011-2012); Jack CITY (2012-2014); Independent (2014-2021)
- Call sign meaning: DX; BEAM, or Broadcast Enterprises Affillated Media

Technical information
- Licensing authority: NTC
- Power: 5 kW TPO
- ERP: 25 kW ERP

Links
- Website: www.beam.com.ph

DXBE-DTV (channel 31) is a television station in Zamboanga City, Philippines, owned and operated by Broadcast Enterprises and Affiliated Media, Inc. The station maintains a transmitter facility at Mount Cabatangan, Zamboanga City.

== History ==
The channel started as Cinema Television (or CTV-31) in 1995. It was also the first UHF station to be inspired by a movie channel on cable. And in 1997, it reformatted to E! Philippines, the local franchise of E!, an American-cable network channel that features fashion and lifestyle shows. But in the year 2003 RMN decided to cancel its operation to TV network, citing financial constraints and poor ratings.

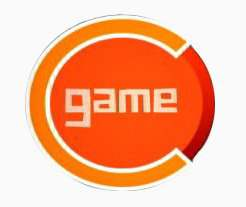
Logo of The Game Channel from August 15, 2011-February 15, 2012

On July 3, 2011, UHF 31 in Zamboanga and all RMN TV stations nationwide returned on test broadcast, as the frequency was occupied by Broadcast Enterprised and Affiliated Media, following the latter being purchased by Bethlehem Holdings, Inc. (funded by Globe Telecom's Group Retirement Fund) from RMN. It was then rebranded as BEAM Channel 31 and The Game Channel on August 15, 2011. The Game Channel limited its broadcast on December 24 of the same year, to give way to its new sister station CHASE which broadcasts on the evening block of The Game Channel. Then, The Game Channel transferred its operation to cable, while CHASE remained on this network and broadcast 24 hours a day. On September 7, 2012, an animated plugged appeared with the message, "Another Jack TV is rising, soon on this channel." The station was rebranded as Jack City, and was launched on October 20, 2012, while CHASE ended its broadcast on October 19.

On September 1, 2014, Jack City no longer aired on Channel 31 and its provincial affiliates as BEAM prepared for their shift to digital television. However, Jack City continued to broadcast on cable networks until March 21, 2015, when the channel were rebranded to CT.

After its closure, it aired O Shopping (of ABS-CBN Corporation and CJ Group of Korea, which aired at that time on the network's mother company (ABS-CBN, which already aired on that area on TV-3) every late night slots, and 24/7 on SkyCable (only available on digital platform, but the area still remains as an analog platform service, although it already covered and served)) and several programs from TBN Asia including The 700 Club Asia, Praise the Lord, Great Day to Live, Ang Tugon, among other local and religious programming produced by the Essential Broadcasting Network under the leadership of Bro. Greg Durante of Greg Durante Ministries which its started from its regular signing-on (7:00 AM) of the date mentioned above.

In late 2018, BEAM TV UHF Channel 31 started to operate its digital signal on test broadcast in Zamboanga on UHF Channel 32 using the ISDB-T system, making it the 2nd television network that made available on digital television in Zamboanga and Region 9, after EMedia Productions.

BEAM TV provincial stations ceased its analog transmission on March 29, 2022 (3 months after BEAM TV 31 Manila closed down its analog signal for the second time on January 1, 2022), as its now fully migrated to digital broadcast permanently. As of March 30, 2022 (a day after its analog shutdown), BEAM TV Digital broadcast started to operate on UHF 31, but still under maintenance as the network still trying to migrate its signal operations which is currently using the digital transmission on UHF 32 in the area. On April 6, 2022, BEAM TV announced launched of PIE, a new channel that co-ownership with ABS-CBN Corporation, Kroma Entertainment and 917Ventures, on May 23, 2022, as the all-new "tradigital" entertainment channel

== Digital television ==
=== Digital channels ===
DXBE-DTV currently operates on UHF Channel 31 (575.143 MHz) and is multiplexed into the following subchannels:

Channel	Video	Aspect	Short name	Programming	Notes
31.1	480i	16:9	PRTV PRIME	PRTV Prime Media	Commercial broadcast
31.2	480i	16:9	UFC TV	UFC TV	Commercial broadcast
31.3	480i	16:9	KNOWLEDGE CHANNEL	Knowledge Channel	Commercial broadcast
31.4	480i	16:9	RESERVED	SMPTE Color Bars	Test broadcast
31.5	480i	16:9	BILYONARYO NEWS CHANNEL	Bilyonaryo News Channel	Commercial broadcast
31.6	480i	16:9	D8TV	D8TV	Commercial broadcast

== Areas of coverage ==
- Zamboanga City
- Basilan
- Zamboanga Sibugay
