= DXKC-DTV =

ISDB-T station
- Metro Davao; Philippines
- City: Davao City
- Channels: Digital: 31 (UHF) (ISDB-T); Virtual: 31.01

Programming
- Subchannels: See list of subchannels
- Affiliations: 31.1: PRTV Prime Media; 31.2: UFC TV; 31.3: Knowledge Channel; 31.4: RESERVED; 31.5: Bilyonaryo News Channel; 31.6: D8TV

Ownership
- Owner: Broadcast Enterprises and Affiliated Media Inc.

History
- Founded: 1995 (RMN TV); July 3, 2011 (BEAM TV)
- Former call signs: DXKC-TV (1995-2003, 2011-2021)
- Former channel numbers: Analog: 31 (UHF, 1995–2003, 2011-2021); Digital: 32 (UHF; 2016–2022)
- Former affiliations: CTV 31 (1995-2000); E! Entertainment (2000-2003); Silent (2003-2011); The Game Channel (2011-2012); CHASE (2011-2012); Jack City (2012-2014); Independent (2014-2021); Shop TV (2016-2018); Pop Life TV/Pop Life Lite (2019); Inquirer 990 TV (2020)

Technical information
- Licensing authority: NTC
- Power: 5 kW TPO
- ERP: 25 kW ERP

Links
- Website: www.beam.com.ph

DXKC-DTV (channel 31) is a television station in Metro Davao, Philippines, serving as the Mindanao flagship of Broadcast Enterprises and Affiliated Media, Inc. The station maintains a transmitter facility along Broadcast Ave., Shrine Hills, Brgy. Matina Crossing, Davao City.

== History ==
It was started as Cinema Television (or CTV-31) in 1995. It was also the first UHF station to be inspired by a movie television. And on year 1997, it had its broadcast rights form E!, an American-cable network channel that features fashion and lifestyle show, which is lately known as E! Philippines. But in the year 2003 RMN decided to cancel its operation to TV network, citing financial constraints and poor ratings.

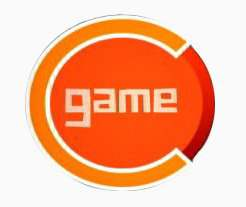
Logo of The Game Channel from August 15, 2011-February 15, 2012

On July 3, 2011, UHF 31 in Davao and all RMN TV stations nationwide returned as a test broadcast, as the frequency was occupied by Broadcast Enterprises and Affiliated Media, following the latter was bought up by Bethlehem Holdings, Inc. (funded by Globe Telecom's Group Retirement Fund) from RMN. Under new ownership, BEAM began its affiliation partnership with Solar Entertainment Corporation.

On June 28, 2013, Solar Entertainment was forced to reduce its Free TV broadcast to 18 hours a day on BEAM in compliance with the National Telecommunications Commission's guidelines. However, it still continues on cable networks 24 hours a day.

On September 1, 2014, BEAM Channel 31 and its provincial affiliates ended its partnership with Solar, as BEAM prepares its ISDB-T digital television.

BEAM TV provincial stations ceased its analog transmission on March 29, 2022 (3 months after BEAM TV 31 Manila closed down its analog signal for the second time on January 1, 2022), as its now fully migrated to digital broadcast permanently. As of March 30, 2022 (a day after its analog shutdown), BEAM TV Digital broadcast started to operate on UHF 31, but still under maintenance as the network still trying to migrate its signal operations which is currently using the digital transmission on UHF 32 in the area. On April 6, 2022, BEAM TV announced launched of PIE, a new channel that co-ownership with ABS-CBN Corporation, Kroma Entertainment and 917Ventures, on May 23, 2022, as the all-new "tradigital" entertainment channel.

== Digital television ==
=== Digital channels ===
DXKC-TV currently operates on UHF Channel 31 (575.143 MHz) and is multiplexed into the following subchannels:

Channel	Video	Aspect	Short name	Programming	Notes
31.1	480i	16:9	PRTV PRIME	PRTV Prime Media	Commercial broadcast
31.2	480i	16:9	UFC TV	UFC TV	Commercial broadcast
31.3	480i	16:9	KNOWLEDGE CHANNEL	Knowledge Channel	Commercial broadcast
31.4	480i	16:9	RESERVED	SMPTE Color Bars	Test broadcast
31.5	480i	16:9	BILYONARYO NEWS CHANNEL	Bilyonaryo News Channel	Commercial broadcast
31.6	480i	16:9	D8TV	D8TV	Commercial broadcast

== Areas of coverage ==
=== Primary areas ===
- Davao City
- Davao del Sur
- Davao del Norte

==== Secondary areas ====
- Portion of Davao de Oro
