= DYRM-DTV =

- Guimaras; Philippines
- Channels: Digital: 26 (UHF) (ISDB-T); Virtual: 26.01

Programming
- Subchannels: See list of subchannels
- Affiliations: 26.1: PRTV Prime Media; 26.2: UFC TV; 26.3: Knowledge Channel; 26.4: RESERVED; 26.5: Bilyonaryo News Channel; 26.6: D8TV

Ownership
- Owner: Broadcast Enterprises and Affiliated Media Inc.

History
- Founded: 1995 (RMN TV); July 3, 2011 (BEAM TV)
- Former call signs: DYRM-TV (1995-2003, 2011-2021)
- Former channel numbers: Analog: 26 (UHF, 1995–2003, 2011-2021); Digital: 42 (UHF, 2017–2022)
- Former affiliations: CTV 26 (1995-2000); E! Entertainment (2000-2003); Silent (2003-2011); The Game Channel (2011-2012); CHASE (2011-2012); Jack City (2012-2014); Independent (2014-2021)

Technical information
- Licensing authority: NTC
- Power: 5 kW TPO
- ERP: 25 kW ERP

Links
- Website: www.beam.com.ph

DYRM-DTV (channel 26) is a digital-only television station of Philippine television in Guimaras, Philippines, owned and operated by Broadcast Enterprises and Affiliated Media, Inc. The station maintains a transmitter facility along Piña-Tamborong-Alaguisoc Road, Brgy. Alaguisoc, Jordan, Guimaras, at the former Globe cell site.

== History ==
It was started as Cinema Television (or CTV-26) in 1995. It was also the first UHF station to be inspired by a movie television. And on year 1997, it had its broadcast rights form E!, an American-cable network channel that features fashion and lifestyle show, which is lately known as E! Philippines. But in the year 2003 RMN decided to cancel its operation to TV network.

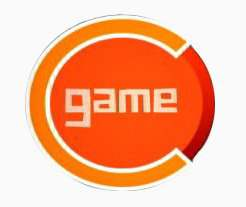
Logo of The Game Channel from August 15, 2011-February 15, 2012

On July 3, 2011, UHF 26 in Iloilo and all RMN TV stations nationwide returned as a test broadcast, as the frequency was occupied by Broadcast Enterprises and Affiliated Media, following the latter was bought up by Bethlehem Holdings, Inc. (funded by Globe Telecom's Group Retirement Fund) from RMN. And then on it was branded as BEAM Channel 26 and The Game Channel on August 15, 2011. Recently, The Game Channel limited to its broadcast on December 24, 2011, to give way to its new sister station CHASE which it was broadcast in evening block of The Game Channel. Recently The Game Channel leased its operation on BEAM and transferred its operation to cable, while CHASE remains on this network and took its 24‑hour broadcast. On September 7, 2012, an animation plug appears on BEAM TV and CHASE and written as: Another Jack TV is rising, soon on this channel. The station was rebranded as Jack City, the station was planned and officiated its launch on October 20, 2012, while CHASE ended its broadcast on October 19. But it lessened its on air limits on free TV to 18 hours a day, due to National Telecommunications Commission's guidelines on free-to-air broadcasters, however it continues broadcasting 24/7 on cable networks. Somehow it ended operations and affiliation partnership with BEAM on August 31, 2014, and was moved to cable networks. BEAM Channel 26 Iloilo, along with other BEAM TV stations nationwide is currently affiliated with Essentials Broadcasting Network thru TBN Asia and O Shopping (an ABS-CBN-owned shopping network channel).

BEAM TV provincial stations ceased its analog transmission on March 29, 2022 (3 months after BEAM TV 31 Manila closed down its analog signal for the second time on January 1, 2022), as its now fully migrated to digital broadcast permanently. As of March 30, 2022 (a day after its analog shutdown), BEAM TV Digital broadcast started to operate on UHF 26, but still under maintenance as the network still trying to migrate its signal operations which is currently using the digital transmission on UHF 42 in the area. On April 6, 2022, BEAM TV announced launched of PIE, a new channel that co-ownership with ABS-CBN Corporation, Kroma Entertainment and 917Ventures, on May 23, 2022 as the all-new "tradigital" entertainment channel

== Digital television ==
=== Digital channels ===
DYRM-DTV currently operates on UHF Channel 26 (545.143 MHz) and is multiplexed into the following subchannels:

Channel	Video	Aspect	Short name	Programming	Notes	
26.1	480i	16:9	PRTV PRIME	PRTV Prime Media	Commercial broadcast	
26.2	480i	16:9	KNOWLEDGE CHANNEL	Knowledge Channel	Commercial broadcast	
26.3	480i	16:9	RESERVED	SMPTE Color Bars	Commercial broadcast	Test broadcast
26.4	480i	16:9	BILYONARYO NEWS CHANNEL	Bilyonaryo News Channel	Commercial broadcast	
26.5	480i	16:9	D8TV	D8TV	Commercial broadcast	

== Areas of coverage ==
=== Primary areas ===
- Iloilo City
- Iloilo
- Guimaras

==== Secondary areas ====
- Bacolod
- Portion of Negros Occidental
