= DWHB-DTV =

- Baguio; Philippines
- Channels: Digital: 26 (UHF) (ISDB-T); Virtual: 26.01

Programming
- Subchannels: See list of subchannels
- Affiliations: 26.1: PRTV Prime Media; 26.2: UFC TV; 26.3: Knowledge Channel; 26.4: RESERVED; 26.5: Bilyonaryo News Channel; 26.6: D8TV

Ownership
- Owner: Broadcast Enterprises and Affiliated Media Inc.
- Sister stations: Through PCMC: 102.3 FM Radio Baguio (DZYB-FM)

History
- Founded: 1990s (RMN TV); July 3, 2011 (BEAM)
- Former call signs: DWHB-TV (1990s-2003, 2011-2021)
- Former channel numbers: Analog: 26 (UHF, 1990s–2003, 2011-2021); Digital: 27 (UHF, 2017–2022)
- Former affiliations: Cinema Television (CTV) (1990s-2000); E! Philippines (2000-2003); Silent (2003-2011); The Game Channel (2011-2012); CHASE (2011-2012); Jack City (2012-2014); Independent (2014-2021)
- Call sign meaning: DW; Herald of Benguet / Herald of Baguio

Technical information
- Licensing authority: NTC
- Power: 5 kW TPO
- ERP: 25 kW ERP

Links
- Website: www.beam.com.ph

DWHB-DTV (channel 26) is a television station in Baguio City, Philippines, owned and operated by Broadcast Enterprises and Affiliated Media Inc. The station maintains a transmitter facility atop Mt. Sto. Tomas, Tuba, Benguet.

== History ==
=== As CTV-26 ===
Sometimes in the 1990s, Radio Mindanao Network became the second radio-based network to launch a TV station called Cinema Television 26 (CTV-26). An all-movie channel, its programming included a presentation of Filipino and Hollywood movies respectively, and programs from E!, an American cable channel. It is the first UHF station to be inspired by the format of a cable movie channel.

However, because of the broadcasting rules assigned by National Telecommunications Commission and the matter that they acquired the broadcast rights from E!, CTV-26 stopped its broadcast in September 2000.

=== As E! Philippines 26 and ceased transmission ===
E! Philippines logo from 2000 to 2003

In October 2000, E! and RMN announced its partnership to relaunch CTV into E! Philippines, with its broadcasting extended into 24 hours. But in 2001, it reduced its broadcasts into 6 primetime-hours, from 6:00 PM to 12:00 MN. Some of E!'s programs were brought to the Philippines and remade in a local version, one of which was Wild On! Philippines. However on June 1, 2003, RMN decided to cease their operations on TV due to financial constraints and poor television ratings, and somehow to focus only on their radio network in Baguio (namely 103.9 iFM Baguio). There were several religious groups who had wished to acquire block programming of E! Philippines, but RMN refused to accept their offers.

=== As BEAM Channel 26 Baguio ===
==== Initial Broadcast & The Game Channel ====
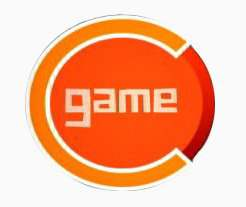
Logo of The Game Channel from August 15, 2011-February 15, 2012. The logo continues to use until August 13, 2012, on cable network.

After 8 years of being silent in Santo Tomas, Benguet City television, on July 3, 2011, UHF 26 returned its operations as a test broadcast. The station (along with other RMN-owned UHF stations nationwide) was occupied by Broadcast Enterprises and Affiliated Media, after the latter bought up the acquisition by Bethlehem Holdings, Inc. (funded by Globe Telecom's Group Retirement Fund) from RMN. And as the first broadcast TV operations under new ownership, BEAM began its affiliation partnership with Solar Entertainment Corporation.

The network was branded on July 13 as BEAM Channel 26. On August 15, 2011, it started its initial broadcast carrying The Game Channel. However, on December 24, The Game Channel limited its broadcast every morning and afternoon, to give way to its new sister network station CHASE, which is used its evening block.

==== CHASE Channel ====
In the later part of February, while CHASE started its programming on night, there is an investigator notebook that appear on the lower-left of the TV screen saying that CHASE goes 24. After that event, on February 15, 2012, after its 7 months of broadcasting on BEAM Channel 26 Baguio, The Game Channel bid-goodbye to the viewers and move its operations on Global Destiny Cable (now Destiny Cable, owned by Sky Cable Corporation; which currently aired on Channel 89 in Mega Manila), while CHASE remained on this channel and took its 24‑hour permanent broadcast. Recently it ended its operation on October 19, 2012.

==== Jack City ====
On September 7, 2012, when they aired 24 on CHASE, an animation signage plugged and written like this: "Another Jack TV is rising, coming soon on this channel". This was the part of Solar TV Network, Inc. plans to use this channel assignment to air the said network. The network is planned and it was launched as the secondary Jack TV network named Jack CITY on October 20, 2012.CHASE ended its operation on October 19, 2012, although some of its programs was still carried over by this channel. The full broadcast was initiated on November 11, 2012. The main reason of reformatting/rebranding is due to CHASE which is find out that is too much male-centric. But on June 28, 2013, BEAM 26 Santo Tomas, Benguet (along with other BEAM stations) limited their operations into 18 hours a day (from 7:00 AM to 12:00mn) due to rules and regulations on free-to-air stations assigned by National Telecommunications Commission, however it continues broadcast 24/7 on cable networks. Recently on August 31, 2014, Jack CITY decided to ended its partnership with BEAM as they have decided to move to cable stations nationwide due to BEAM prepares for digital transition.

==== Blocktiming hours ====
As BEAM prepares for the digital television era and Jack City continues to broadcast on cable networks until March 21, 2015, when the channel were rebranded as CT; it started aired O Shopping (of ABS-CBN Corporation and CJ Group of Korea, which aired at that time on the network's mother company (ABS-CBN, which already aired on that area on TV-3) every late night slots, and 24/7 on SkyCable (only available on digital platform) and several programs from TBN Asia, Great Day to Live, Ang Tugon, among other local and religious programming produced by the Essential Broadcasting Network under the leadership of Bro. Greg Durante of Greg Durante Ministries which its started from its regular signing-on on September 1, 2014.

Between March and summer of 2015, the channel also continues increased more blocktiming hours and programming (contains religious and home shopping programs, as well as telenovelas; in line with other BEAM stations). Notable blocktimers added at that time were: TVShoppe (also known as 'revival' of Value Vision) and Shop Japan.

In preparation for their full migration to digital broadcast, BEAM TV announced that they will discontinue their broadcast on analog after 10 years for the second time on January 1, 2022, hence, they're the fourth broadcaster to shift in full digital operations to do so. BEAM TV on analog telecast made its final sign-off appearance on December 31, 2021, as the station was now fully migrated to digital broadcast only. As of January 18, 2022 (18 days later, after its analog shutdown), BEAM TV Digital broadcast started to operate on UHF 26, but still under maintenance as the network still trying to migrate its signal operations which is currently using the digital transmission on UHF 27 in the area.

=== As PIE Channel 26 Baguio ===
On April 6, 2022, BEAM announced its co-ownership with ABS-CBN Corporation, Kroma Entertainment and 917Ventures for its launching of Pinoy Interactive Entertainment or PIE, with ABS-CBN served as its main content production provider while Kroma Entertainment as its technological innovative interaction format backed by 917Ventures. The channel started its test broadcast on April 25, 2022, showcasing unprompted daily questions each day until May 15, followed by a seven-day "Countdown to TagumPIE" special day on May 16–22, and made its official launch on May 23, 2022.

== Digital television ==
=== Digital channels ===
DWHB-DTV is now currently operated by the VHF or UHF Channel 26 (545.143 MHz) and is now multiplexed into these following 6 BEAM-DTV subchannels:

Channel	Video	Aspect	Short name	Programming	Notes
26.01	480i	16:9	PRTV PRIME	PRTV Prime Media	Commercial broadcast
26.02	480i	16:9	UFC TV	UFC TV	Commercial broadcast
26.03	480i	16:9	KNOWLEDGE CHANNEL	Knowledge Channel	Commercial broadcast
26.04	480i	16:9	RESERVED	SMPTE Color Bars	Test broadcast
26.05	480i	16:9	BILYONARYO NEWS CHANNEL	Bilyonaryo News Channel	Commercial broadcast
26.06	480i	16:9	D8TV	D8TV	Commercial broadcast

== Areas of coverage ==
=== Primary areas ===
- Baguio
- Benguet
- Dagupan
- Pangasinan
- La Union

==== Secondary areas ====
- Nueva Ecija
- Tarlac
- Portion of Pampanga
- Portion of Bulacan
- Portion of Ilocos Sur
