= DWKC-DTV =

- Metro Manila; Philippines
- City: Mandaluyong
- Channels: Digital: 31 (UHF) (ISDB-T); Virtual: 31.01

Programming
- Subchannels: See list of subchannels
- Affiliations: 31.1: PRTV Prime Media; 31.2: Knowledge Channel; 31.3: RESERVED; 31.4: Bilyonaryo News Channel; 31.5: D8TV

Ownership
- Owner: Broadcast Enterprises and Affiliated Media, Inc.

History
- First air date: October 31, 1993; 32 years ago
- Last air date: December 31, 2021; 4 years ago (Analog TV broadcast)
- Former call signs: DWKC-TV (1993–2003, 2011–21)
- Former channel numbers: Analog: 31 (UHF, 1993–2003, 2011–21); Digital: 32 (UHF, 2014–20); 50 (UHF, 2020–22)
- Former affiliations: Cinema Television (CTV) (1993–2000); E! Philippines (2000–2003); Silent (2003–11); The Game Channel (2011–12); CHASE (2011–12); Jack City (2012–14); BEAM TV (2014–21); Shop TV (2016–18); Pop Life (2019); Inquirer 990 TV (2020); DepEd TV (2021–22)
- Call sign meaning: derived from former sister station DWKC-FM

Technical information
- Licensing authority: NTC
- Power: 5 kW
- ERP: 25 kW
- Transmitter coordinates: 14°36′37.4″N 121°9′25.4″E

Links
- Website: www.beam.com.ph

DWKC-DTV (channel 31) is a digital-only television station in Metro Manila, Philippines, serving as the flagship of Broadcast Enterprises and Affiliated Media, Inc. Its main office is located at the 3rd floor, Globe Telecom Plaza 1, Pioneer Street corner Madison St., Mandaluyong City, Metro Manila while its transmitter and master control is located at Palos Verdes Subdivision, Sumulong Highway, Barangay Santa Cruz, Antipolo City, Rizal Province.

== History ==
=== As CTV-31 ===
On October 31, 1993, Radio Mindanao Network became the second radio-based network to launch a TV station called Cinema Television 31 (CTV-31) through its flagship station, DWKC-TV. An all-movie channel, its programming included a presentation of Filipino and Hollywood movies respectively, and programs from E!, an American cable channel. It is the first UHF station to be inspired by the format of a cable movie channel. The station once clinched a top spot for its TV ratings in all UHF stations. However, because of the broadcasting rules assigned by National Telecommunications Commission and the matter that they acquired the broadcast rights from E!, CTV-31 stopped its broadcast in September 2000, exacerbated by stiff competition from Studio 23 (now known as S+A, and later IZTV/Aliw 23), a UHF rival operated by ABS-CBN Corporation through AMCARA Broadcasting Network. .

=== E! Philippines 31 and ceased transmission ===
E! Philippines Channel 31 logo from 2000 to 2003

In September 2000, E! and RMN announced its partnership to relaunch CTV into E! Philippines Channel 31, with its broadcasting extended into 12 hours. But in 2003, it reduced its broadcasts into 6 broadcasting-hours, from 6:00 PM to 12:00 MN. Some of E!'s programs were brought to the Philippines and remade in a local version, one of which was Wild On! Philippines. However, on June 1, 2003, RMN decided to cease their operations on TV due to financial constraints and poor television ratings as well as increasing losses and debts brought about by few advertisers (e.g. Fortune Tobacco Corporation; now PMFTC), and somehow to focus only on their 2 radio networks (RMN and iFM). There were several religious groups who had wished to acquire block programming of E! Philippines, but RMN refused to accept their offers. Some programs of E! were broadcast later to Q (now GTV, current aired over Channel 27) via E! on Q, ETC (now SolarFlix, aired over SBN), Solar News Channel (aired over RPN), and Velvet (now defunct).

From July 2011 to December 31, 2019, E! (now defunct) has been available on most major cable/satellite systems in the Philippines distributed by Universal Networks International (a subsidiary of NBCUniversal).

=== As BEAM Channel 31 ===
==== Initial Broadcast and The Game Channel ====
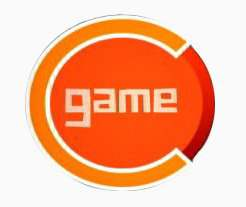
Logo of The Game Channel from August 15, 2011-February 15, 2012. The logo was continually used until August 13, 2012, on the cable network.

After almost eight years of inactivity on television service, on July 3, 2011, UHF 31 returned its operations as a test broadcast. The station (along with some RMN-owned UHF stations nationwide) was occupied by Broadcast Enterprises and Affiliated Media, after the latter bought up the acquisition by Bethlehem Holdings, Inc. (funded by Globe Telecom's Group Retirement Fund) from RMN. Under new ownership, BEAM began its affiliation partnership with Solar Entertainment Corporation.

The network was branded on July 13 as BEAM Channel 31. On August 15, 2011, it started its initial broadcast carrying The Game Channel.

==== As CHASE ====
On December 24, 2011, The Game Channel limited its broadcast on daytime sharing with a new programming service called CHASE which takes over the evening block. In February 2012, both services aired a promotion, announcing the split of CHASE and TGC to form themselves as separate channels, which entitled "CHASE goes 24". The changes took effect on February 15, 2012, when The Game Channel bade goodbye to the viewers after its 7-month run on free TV and became a cable-only channel; while CHASE leased and took its entire BEAM airtime on free TV.

==== As Jack City ====
On September 7, 2012, Jack TV plugged their announcement thru CHASE programs bearing the title "Another Jack TV is rising, coming soon on this channel" (BEAM Channel 31). This indicated that CHASE was being replaced; finally, on October 20, 2012, Jack City was then launched, marking October 19 as the end of CHASE's broadcasts. Jack City still does carry some of CHASE's programs however. The full broadcast was initiated on November 11, 2012. On June 28, 2013, Jack City was forced to reduce its Free TV broadcast to 18 hours a day on BEAM in compliance with the National Telecommunications Commission's guidelines. However, it still continues to air as a cable channel 24 hours a day.

On July 16, 2014, the day that Metro Manila was crippled by "Typhoon Glenda (Rammasun)", the station became inactive. It was later found out that the transmitter located in Palos Verdes in Antipolo, Rizal received a total damage to some of its facilities done by the said typhoon. As a result, the station shuts down temporarily for another maintenance, and continued its telecast on cable networks. Somehow it resumed telecast on August 10, 2014, at 9:00 PM, but still under observation.

==== Digital television broadcast and Independent telecast ====
On September 1, 2014, Jack City ceased its affiliation status on BEAM Channel 31 and its provincial affiliates, as BEAM prepares its ISDB-T digital television. However, Jack City continues to broadcast on pay TV networks until March 21, 2015, when the channel was rebranded as CT a day later on March 22, 2015.

At the same day, it began using blocktime programs from O Shopping (of ABS-CBN Corporation and CJ Group of Korea) and several programs from TBN Asia (including The 700 Club Asia and Praise the Lord) along with religious programming produced by the Essential Broadcasting Network under the leadership of Bro. Greg Durante of Greg Durante Ministries.

On November 15, 2014, the channel is carried over SkyCable, Destiny Cable and other Pay TV subscribers (per compliance with NTC's "must-carry" basis), displacing Jack City to a different cable channel assignment, which is only available for subscribers residing in Metro Manila and neighboring provinces. This also makes BEAM available to cable viewers 24 hours a day once again when it took effect four months later, on March 12, 2015.

On March 1, 2015, TV Shop Philippines (also known as revival of Value Vision) began airing on this channel in the afternoon, followed by selected Tagalog-dubbed telenovelas carried from the now-defunct Telenovela Channel on nighttime.

On March 9, 2015, the channel also added Shop Japan to its programming during morning hours; Shop TV began its infomercial service on February 22, 2016 (Shop TV, ironically, is owned by BEAM's former blocktime partner Solar Entertainment), but would end transmission with BEAM after December 31, 2018.

By March 1, 2016, all of BEAM's programs were split into digital television streams. O Shopping, TBN, TV Shop and Shop Japan were relocated as their respective digital subchannel of its own; while BEAM became an affiliate of Shop TV in its analog signal, allowing it to cover most of BEAM's airtime (Tagalog-dubbed telenovelas remained on the analog channel during primetime).

In May 2016, BEAM added the live video streaming service of Philippine Daily Inquirer and Trans-Radio Broadcasting Corporation's Radyo Inquirer 990 as its new subchannel affiliate, coinciding with the 2016 Philippine elections. Within the same month, Bacolod City-based travel and lifestyle cable channel Island Living (broadcasting its programs through provincial cable operators including some affiliates of SkyCable from Visayas and Mindanao) became BEAM's new subchannel, followed by the replacement of TBN Asia with Taiwan-based Christian pay TV channel GOOD TV (which is in fact aired as a former blocktime program from Light Network (now Light TV) and as a standalone channel on Destiny Cable and Cignal). GOOD TV PH, however, was replaced by infomercial service EZShop weeks later. Its channel space on digital television remains vacant since July 2016, with GCTV returned a few months later.

The channel split of BEAM was finally completed in August 2016 when telenovelas were removed from the network's main/analog feed. Since then, constant changes occur on its digital subchannels from time to time.

On September 1, 2016, Filipino cultural channel Pilipinas HD (owned by the late sportscaster Chino Trinidad) was added to BEAM's subchannel lineup.

On January 4, 2020, BEAM's digital transmission was changed frequency from UHF channel 32 to 50 to avoid signal interference with the DTT operations of GMA Batangas, and upon ceasing transmission on analog in 2022, it moved to its current frequency on channel 31.

==== Subchannel adjustments and migration to digital broadcast ====
In 2021, Jesus is Shield Worldwide Ministries acquired a timeshare block on BEAM's 3rd subchannel occupied by Pilipinas HD. The said timeshare block carried the syndicated religious program Oras ng Himala on a mid-morning and primetime evening slot basis until December 30, 2022.

In preparation for their full migration to digital broadcast, BEAM TV announced that they will discontinue their broadcast on analog after 10 years for the second time on January 1, 2022, hence, they're the fourth broadcaster to shift in full digital operations to do so. BEAM TV on analog telecast made its final sign-off appearance on December 31, 2021, as the station was now fully migrated to digital broadcast only. As of January 18, 2022 (18 days later, after its analog shutdown), BEAM TV Digital broadcast started to operate on UHF 31, but still under maintenance as the network still trying to migrate its signal operations which is currently using the digital transmission on UHF 50 in the area.

On April 6, 2022, BEAM announced its co-ownership with ABS-CBN Corporation, Kroma Entertainment and 917Ventures for its launching of Pinoy Interactive Entertainment or PIE, with ABS-CBN served as its main content production provider while Kroma Entertainment as its technological innovative interaction format backed by 917Ventures. The channel started its test broadcast on April 25, 2022, showcasing unprompted daily questions each day until May 15, followed by a seven-day "Countdown to TagumPIE" special day on May 16–22, and made its official launch on May 23, 2022.

In June 2022, Knowledge Channel moved from Channel 50 to its 2nd subchannel on the Channel 31 digital signal.

On September 13, 2022, BEAM signed an agreement to broadcast the timeshare simulcast with ALLTV, owned by Villar Group's Prime Asset Ventures, Inc. (Streamtech through Planet Cable's Advanced Media Broadcasting System), and added it to its subchannel lineup. The said move was done to increase the latter's nationwide reach. However, on January 1, 2024, PIE and ALLTV both terminated on BEAM TV's digital subchannel due to the former migrating to digital and the latter's expiration of its licensing agreement, which would not be renewed.

On January 17, 2024, BEAM added Blast Sports on its digital subchannel lineup after the latter signed an agreement with TAP Digital Media Ventures Corporation. The new channel was named after TAP DMV's own streaming platform, Blast TV, and airs selected sporting events that are also broadcast on TAP Sports and Premier Sports. The said channel ceased broadcasting on September 1, 2025, and was replaced by UFC TV, a dedicated channel for Ultimate Fighting Championships and a dedicated channel for boxing and wrestling programs, while still under the operation of TAP DMV, until its closure on January 2, 2026, due to the expiration of its licensing agreement with TAP DMV that was not being renewed.

== Digital television ==
=== Digital channels ===
DWKC-DTV currently operates on UHF Channel 31 (575.143 MHz) and is multiplexed into the following subchannels:

Channel	Video	Aspect	Short name	Programming	Notes
31.1	480i	16:9	PRTV PRIME	PRTV Prime Media	Commercial broadcast
31.2	480i	16:9	KNOWLEDGE CHANNEL	Knowledge Channel	Commercial broadcast
31.3	480i	16:9	RESERVED	SMPTE Color Bars	Test broadcast
31.4	480i	16:9	BILYONARYO NEWS CHANNEL	Bilyonaryo News Channel	Commercial broadcast
31.5	480i	16:9	D8TV	D8TV	Commercial broadcast

=== Transition to digital television ===
According to BEAM president Steve Macion, the station is expected to replace the 50 kW (4,050 kilowatt ERP) analog transmitter with a new, DTT-ready transmitter which is currently under transition and would be completed by the end of 2015. Cebu, Davao and Iloilo stations are also expected to upgrade to digital broadcast.

Aside from blocktimers, BEAM is now looking for local and foreign partnerships to allocate and generate content up to eight digital free TV channels.

In 2016, DYCT-DTV and DXKC-DTV, BEAM's stations in Cebu and Davao, respectively, conducted DTT test transmissions on UHF channel 32. DYRM-DTV, BEAM's Iloilo station, conducted its DTT test in 2017.

== Areas of coverage ==
=== Primary areas ===
- Metro Manila
- Cavite
- Bulacan
- Laguna
- Rizal

==== Secondary areas ====
- Eastern Pampanga
- Southern Nueva Ecija
- Southern Bataan
- Northern Batangas
