= DWHB =

DWHB may refer to both stations in Baguio:

- DWHB-FM, an FM station branded as iFM
- DWHB-TV, a digital television station
