= PCSO Lottery Draw =

Philippine television lottery game show

- Also known as: Philippine Lotto Draw (1995–2013); Philippine Lottery Draw (2013–2016)
- Genre: Lottery game show
- Created by: Philippine Charity Sweepstakes Office
- Directed by: Andres Bonifacio, Jr. Carby Salvador
- Presented by: PCSO Lottery Draws#Current hosts|Various hosts|PCSO Hosts
- Opening theme: "Araw-Araw, Let's Play Lotto" by Jude Ralph Roldan (2006–2013)
- Country of origin: Philippines
- Original language: Tagalog
- No. of episodes: n/a (airs daily)

Production
- Camera setup: Multiple-camera setup
- Running time: 5 minutes (1995–1997); 15 minutes (1997–2017); 30 minutes (2017)
- Production companies: Philippine Charity Sweepstakes Office; Digital 8, Inc.

Original release
- Network: PTV/NBN
- Release: March 8, 1995 – December 31, 2003
- Release: January 2, 2005 – December 30, 2024
- Network: IBC/D8TV
- Release: December 31, 2024 – present

The PCSO Lottery Draws (formerly Philippine Lotto Draw and Philippine Lottery Draw) is a Philippine television game show broadcast on IBC and D8TV (via BEAM TV transmitters), under a joint venture between the two networks and the Philippine Charity Sweepstakes Office (PCSO).

Lotto draws were first aired on PTV/NBN from March 8, 1995 to July 27, 2019; and again from July 31, 2019 to December 30, 2024. The program's production involving the PCSO workforce consisting of more than 2,000 employees. The program consists of the drawing of both the parimutuel and fixed payout lottery games, as well as select sweepstakes games. On November 15, 2017, it added the centralized draws of the Small Town Lottery (Pares, Swer3 and Swer2) for provinces that do not conduct its own local STL draws.

The program is also simulcast over DWAN 1206 AM, select Brigada News FM stations in the provinces, as well as PCSO and IBC's websites, Facebook pages and YouTube channels. The show's audio component formerly aired on DWWW, DZRB, DZRH, DWIZ, DZME and DZIQ.

== History ==
The program was launched on March 8, 1995, under the title Philippine Lotto Draw, with original hosts Tina Revilla, Kathy De Leon-Villar and various other hosts (including Timmy Cruz) until September 30, 2004.

In 2013, the program changed its name to Philippine Lottery Draw.

Since 2016, the show has been known as the PCSO Lottery Draw.

On October 27, 2019, the program launched a new segment called "Handog Pasasalamat sa Pamilyang Pilipino", as part of the 85th-anniversary celebration of the PCSO. In the segment, five families from a selected barangay would receive various items, such as groceries, as well as cash prizes from a sponsor usually associated with the PCSO. The segment is hosted by one of the main hosts and either guest co-host Dennis Padilla or Gary Lim. It is held every Monday, Wednesday, Friday, and Sunday.

In October 2022, 433 people struck the jackpot in a single draw day, which became the highest number of people to win the Grand Lotto's top prize. This prompted suspicion among many, including statistics experts.

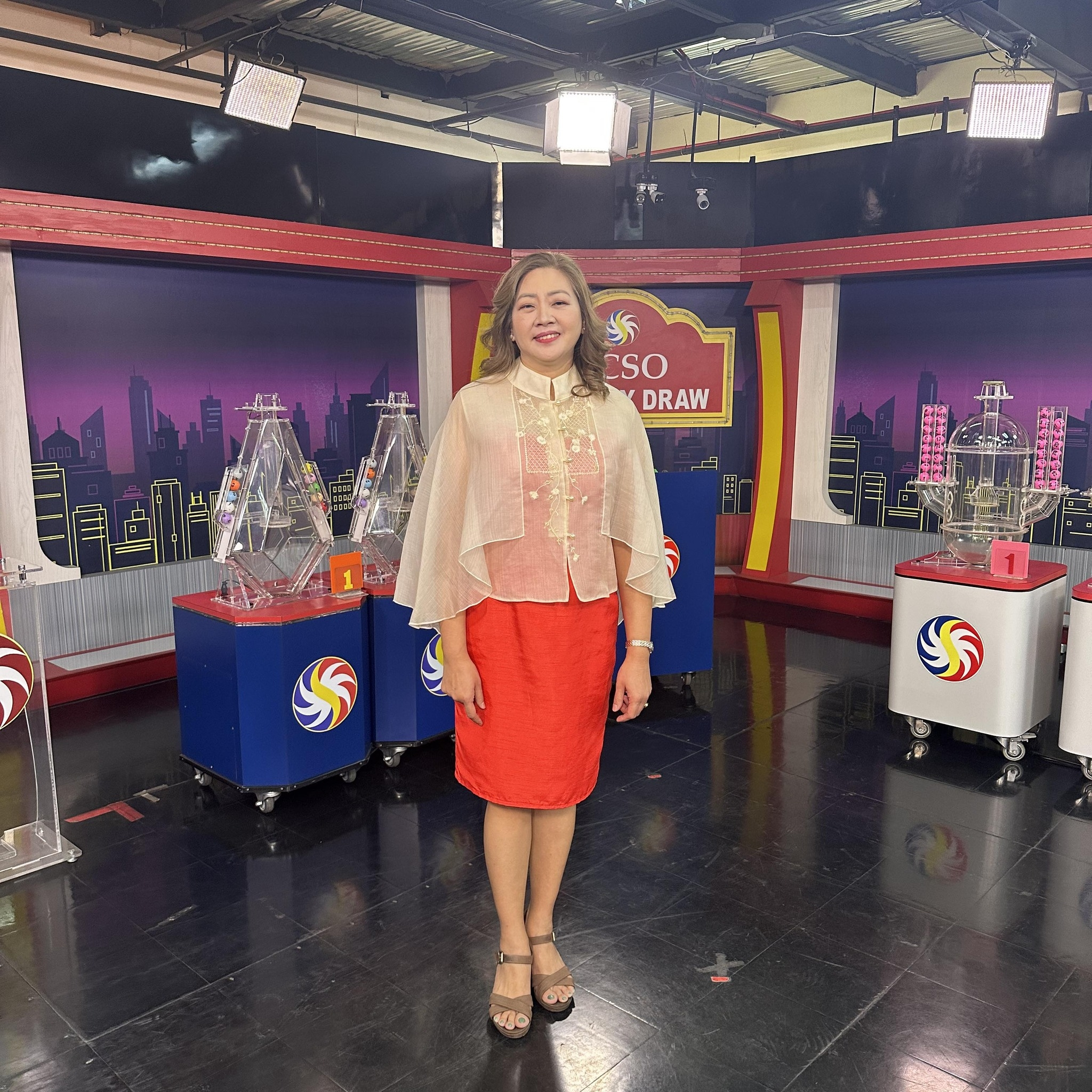
PCSO Director Janet De Leon-Mercado at the studio set of PCSO Lottery Draw

By November 18, 2023, all previous hosts of the program resigned and were replaced by a new set of hosts consisting of beauty queens, artists, indie acting performers, TV hosts, social media personalities and content creators.

== Draw procedure ==
Before every draw, a clip is aired showing the inspection earlier in the day of the blowing machines, called "Mega Gems", and the balls to be used for each game. The inspections are done to ensure fairness and that nothing is concealed in the machines and balls for the draw day. The inspection is undertaken by a panel of judges, composed of a neutral set of people not connected with the PCSO. Representatives from the Commission on Audit oversee both these proceedings and the draw itself to see to it that everything goes according to protocol. The pre-draw procedure is as follows:

1. The panel inspects each of the Mega Gems to be used in the draws for a draw day, including the interior of the blowing chamber and the blowing mechanisms. This is to make sure there is nothing hidden in the Mega Gems that will invalidate the entire draw, such as hidden balls or obstructions. The Mega Gems are also given a dry run using a set of unmarked ping-pong balls to test if they would work as they should come to the actual draw.
2. The balls to be used in each game are stored inside briefcases. There are usually three cases of balls to be used on each game, distinguished by either numbers or uppercase or lowercase letters. The panel randomly chooses one set using cards and its chosen card is shown. In the lot games such as the Super Lotto 6/49 and 2D Lotto, the balls are of one colour, and each set may have a different colour. In the digit games such as the 6D Lotto, no matter the set is chosen, each digit from 0 to 9 has a different colour, and each set is identical. In Small Town Lottery games, all balls are of one colour.
3. After one set of balls has been chosen for a game, each of the balls is weighed to see if they have the same or almost the same weight using a digital scale. This part of the procedure is covered by a separate video camera, which will record any abnormal circumstance, such as ball switching or a ball which either is overweight or is too light, should it comes out.
4. After the balls for the game are weighed, they are loaded by hand by the head of the panel into the loading bays of the game's Mega Gem. This is the only first of the two times human intervention is needed as each Mega Gem is operated using a remote console stationed a small distance away from the unit. The second, never shown but implied, is the removal of the balls from the Mega Gem after each draw show has ended and the results of the draws are recorded. In the case of digit lottery games, the removal of balls is the third time, as the drawn balls are also adjusted (see below).

Each Mega Gem, depending on the type of game, is operated by automation. The Mega Gem loads the balls from the loading bays to the draw chamber, after which the blower starts to mix the balls. In the number lottery games (excluding the Power Lotto), the machine draws six numbered balls one at a time, with each ball inserted into the inner left loading bay. In machines used in the 2D Lotto and the digit lottery games, each number/digit in the combination is drawn from its own chamber. Once a ball is drawn, it is locked into place by slats placed over the pipe leading from the drawing chamber. Once the necessary number of balls has been picked, the Mega Gem is turned off.

The Mega Gem used in the Power Lotto (mentioned below) is a compound version of the two types of Mega Gems mentioned above. The chamber that draws the main five numbers has its ball-loading bays placed at the back but has a separate tube where the five drawn number balls are directed. It is operated the same way as the Mega Gem used in the other number lottery games. The chamber that draws the power number is the same one used in the 6D Lotto draw. The first chamber is first turned on to draw the five main numbers. Afterwards, the first chamber is turned off and the second chamber is then switched on to draw the power number. After the power number has been drawn, the entire machine is turned off.

Balls typically have numbers all over their outer edges. The numbers on balls used in number lottery games (except the 2D Lotto) are read on the spot without the need to touch the balls. In the digit lottery games and the 2D Lotto with top drawing Mega Gems, the balls used to be adjusted to clearly show the numbers drawn. Because of the nature of the Power Lotto Mega Gem, each of the methods mentioned were applied to each of the machine's two chambers.

However, since the launch of Bingo Milyonaryo in 2013, the balls are no longer adjusted. Instead, the numbers on the balls are read on the spot by the host. This applies to all games.

== Games ==
The PCSO Lottery Draw currently hosts a total of nine games, each with its own combinations and mechanics of play.

The number lottery games are:

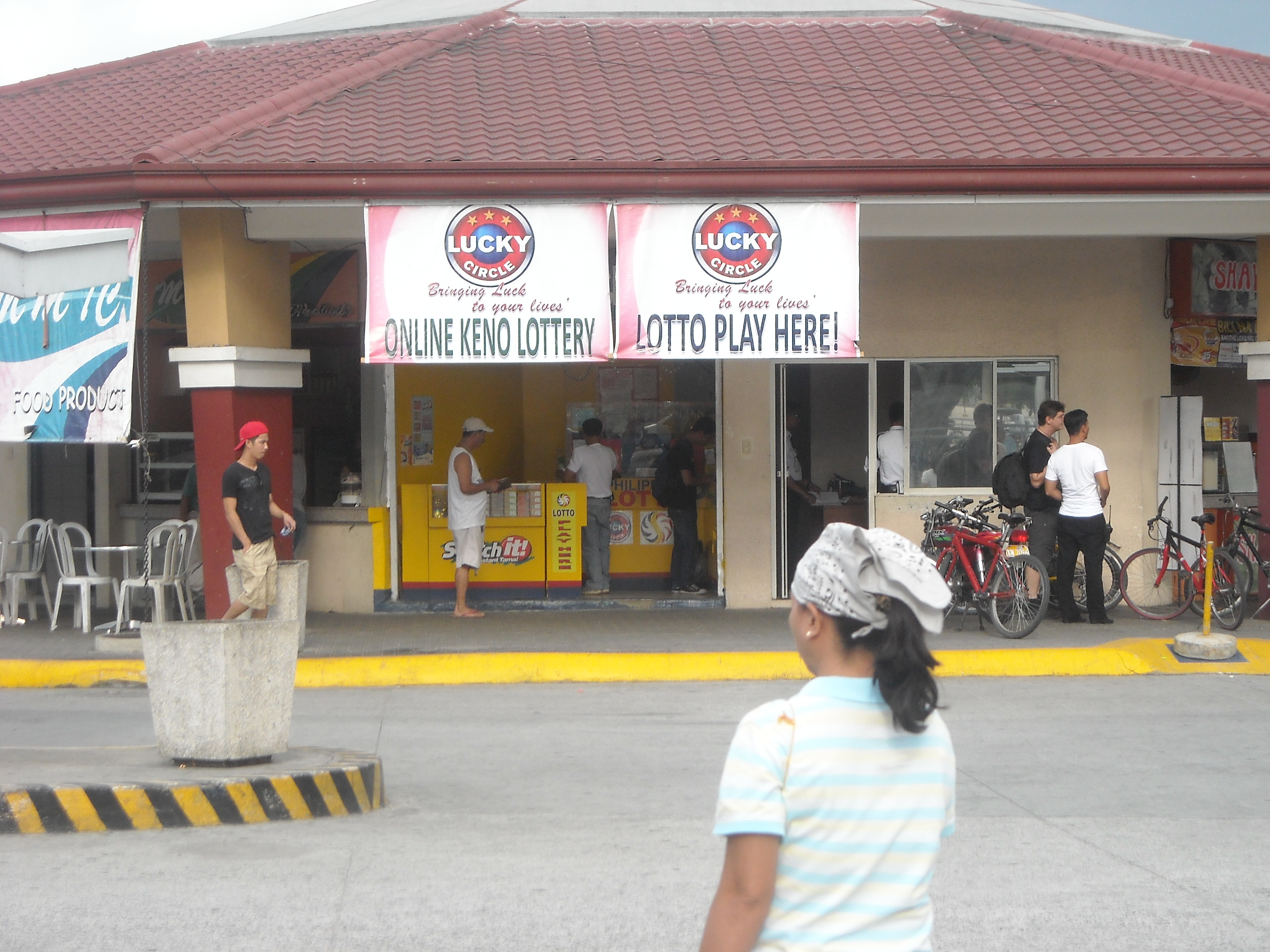
A typical outlet in Angeles City for purchasing tickets.

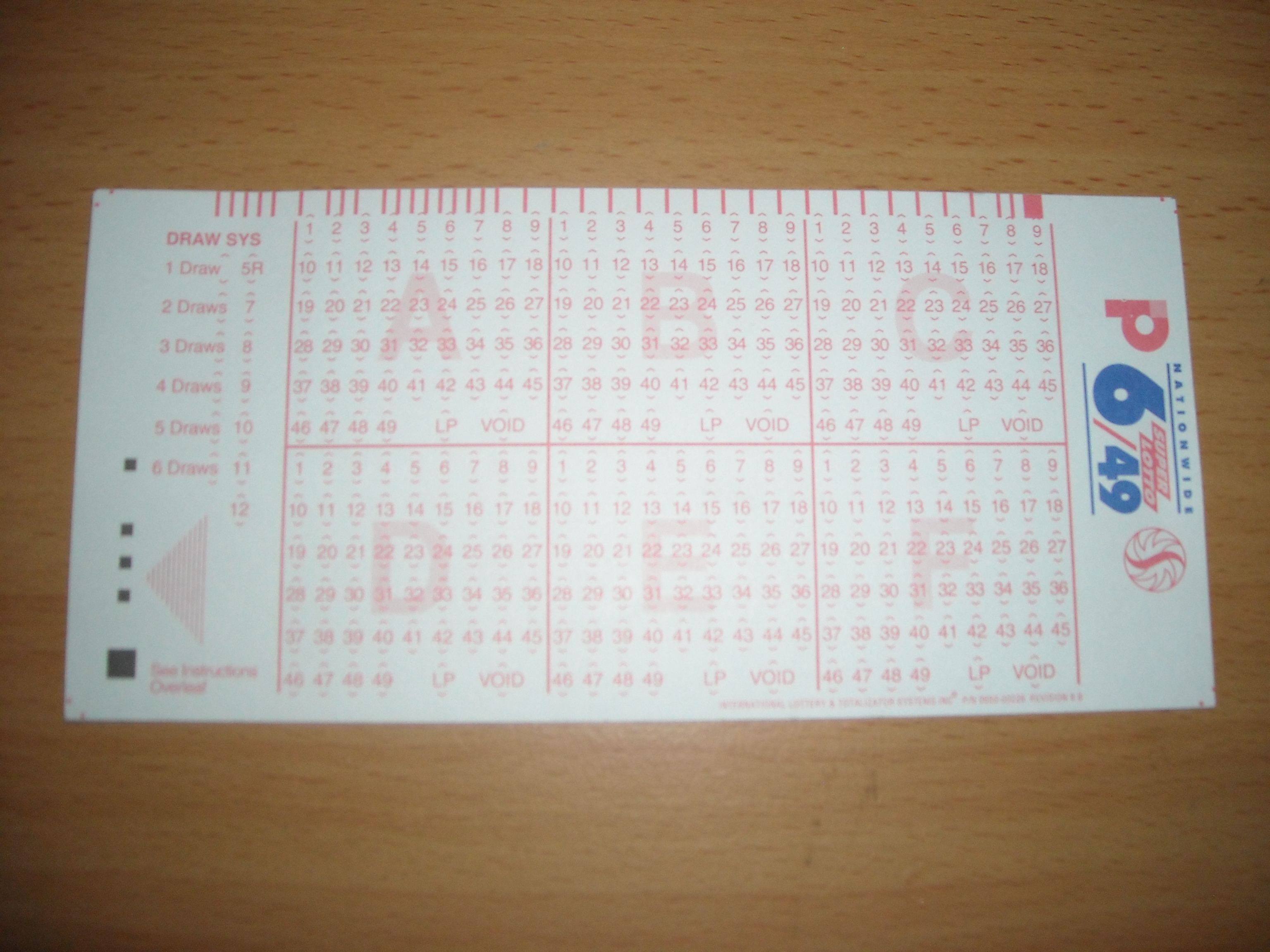
The card for playing Super Lotto 6/49.

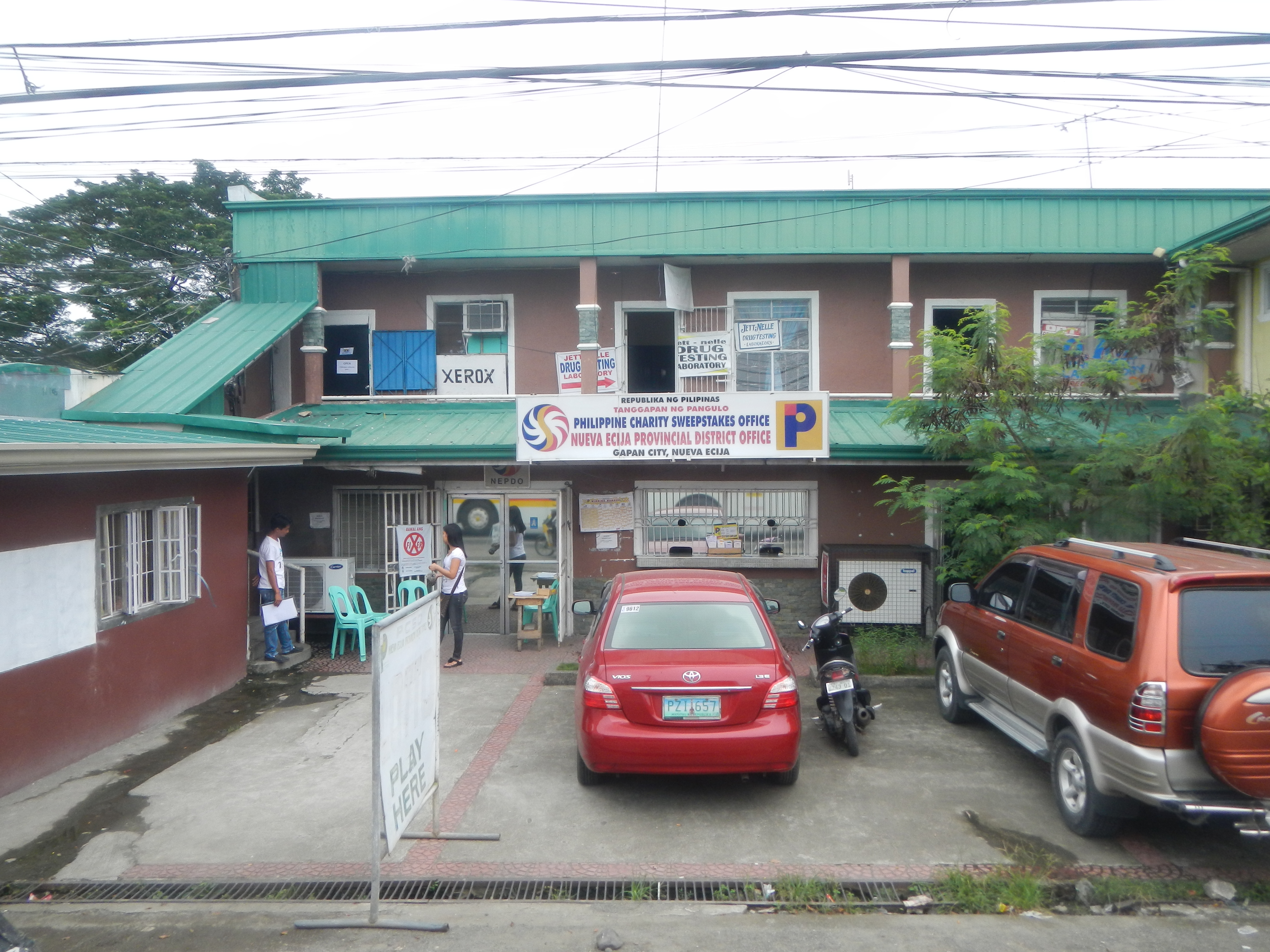
A provincial PCSO office (Gapan, Nueva Ecija Provincial District Office).

=== Pari-mutuel games ===
As of February 1, 2026, one ticket of a game below costs ₱25; previously, it was ₱10 from 1995 to 2013, ₱20 from 2013 to 2018, ₱24 from 2018 to 2020 and back to ₱20 from 2020 to 2026.

Under the TRAIN Law, PCSO Lotto winnings exceeding PHP10,000.00 are subject to a 20% final tax. Prizes amounting to PHP10,000.00 or less are tax-exempt. This tax is withheld automatically by the PCSO before payment to the winner.

Summary of winning prize range and place to claim winning prize
Winning prize range	Place to claim winning prize
₱20.00 to ₱10,000.00	Any authorized Lotto outlet or any PCSO branch office
₱10,000.01 to ₱300,000.00	PCSO main office or any PCSO branch office
₱300,000.01 to jackpot	PCSO main office only

Summary of betting payments per draw
Game	Betting price per ticket per draw							
Game	Straight (Default)	System 5R	System 7	System 8	System 9	System 10	System 11	System 12
Lotto 6/42	₱25.00	₱925.00	₱175.00	₱700.00	₱2,100.00	₱5,250.00	₱11,500.00	₱23,100.00
Mega Lotto 6/45	₱25.00	₱1,000.00	₱175.00	₱700.00	₱2,100.00	₱5,250.00	₱11,500.00	₱23,100.00
Super Lotto 6/49	₱25.00	₱1,100.00	₱175.00	₱700.00	₱2,100.00	₱5,250.00	₱11,500.00	₱23,100.00
Grand Lotto 6/55	₱25.00	₱1,250.00	₱175.00	₱700.00	₱2,100.00	₱5,250.00	₱11,500.00	₱23,100.00
Ultra Lotto 6/58	₱25.00	₱1,325.00	₱175.00	₱700.00	₱2,100.00	₱5,250.00	₱11,500.00	₱23,100.00

Summary of betting payments for 6 draws
Game	Betting price per ticket for 6 draws							
Game	Straight (Default)	System 5R	System 7	System 8	System 9	System 10	System 11	System 12
Lotto 6/42	₱150.00	₱5,550.00	₱1,050.00	₱4,200.00	₱12,600.00	₱31,500.00	₱69,000.00	₱138,600.00
Mega Lotto 6/45	₱150.00	₱6,000.00	₱1,050.00	₱4,200.00	₱12,600.00	₱31,500.00	₱69,000.00	₱138,600.00
Super Lotto 6/49	₱150.00	₱6,600.00	₱1,050.00	₱4,200.00	₱12,600.00	₱31,500.00	₱69,000.00	₱138,600.00
Grand Lotto 6/55	₱150.00	₱7,500.00	₱1,050.00	₱4,200.00	₱12,600.00	₱31,500.00	₱69,000.00	₱138,600.00
Ultra Lotto 6/58	₱150.00	₱7,950.00	₱1,050.00	₱4,200.00	₱12,600.00	₱31,500.00	₱69,000.00	₱138,600.00

Summary of maximum betting payments per betting slip
Game	Number of betting tickets per betting slip	Maximum betting price per betting slip (Note: System 12, 6 draws.)
Lotto 6/42	6	₱831,600.00
Mega Lotto 6/45	6	₱831,600.00
Super Lotto 6/49	6	₱831,600.00
Grand Lotto 6/55	4	₱554,400.00
Ultra Lotto 6/58	4	₱554,400.00

Summary of odds of winning jackpot
Game	Odds of winning jackpot							
Game	Straight (Default)	System 5R	System 7	System 8	System 9	System 10	System 11	System 12
Lotto 6/42	1 in 5,245,786	1 in 141,778	1 in 749,398	1 in 187,350	1 in 62,450	1 in 24,980	1 in 11,355	1 in 5,678
Mega Lotto 6/45	1 in 8,145,060	1 in 203,627	1 in 1,163,580	1 in 290,895	1 in 96,965	1 in 38,786	1 in 17,630	1 in 8,815
Super Lotto 6/49	1 in 13,983,816	1 in 317,814	1 in 1,997,688	1 in 499,422	1 in 166,474	1 in 66,590	1 in 30,268	1 in 15,134
Grand Lotto 6/55	1 in 28,989,675	1 in 579,794	1 in 4,141,383	1 in 1,035,346	1 in 345,116	1 in 138,047	1 in 62,749	1 in 31,375
Ultra Lotto 6/58	1 in 40,475,358	1 in 763,686	1 in 5,782,194	1 in 1,445,549	1 in 481,850	1 in 192,740	1 in 87,609	1 in 43,805

Summary of jackpot winnings and consolation prizes
Game	Jackpot		Consolation prizes (Note: To be shared equally per standard bet except for the 3 winning numbers.)		
Game	Minimum	Largest	5 winning numbers	4 winning numbers	3 winning numbers
Lotto 6/42	₱10,000,000.00	₱102,346,298.00	₱1,100,000.00	₱1,000,000.00	₱20.00
Mega Lotto 6/45	₱15,000,000.00	₱107,506,074.20	₱1,200,000.00	₱1,100,000.00	₱30.00
Super Lotto 6/49	₱25,000,000.00	₱640,654,817.60	₱1,300,000.00	₱1,200,000.00	₱50.00
Grand Lotto 6/55	₱45,000,000.00	₱741,176,323.20	₱1,400,000.00	₱1,300,000.00	₱60.00
Ultra Lotto 6/58	₱75,000,000.00	₱1,180,622,508.00	₱1,500,000.00	₱1,400,000.00	₱100.00

Summary of when betting all combinations
Game	Number of betting slips needed			Amount needed			Difference from the jackpot	
Game	Straight	System 12	Difference	Straight	System 12	Difference	Minimum	Largest
Lotto 6/42	874,298	947	873,351	₱131,144,650.00	₱131,161,800.00	–₱17,150.00	–₱121,144,650.00	–₱28,798,352.00
Mega Lotto 6/45	1,357,510	1,470	1,356,040	₱203,626,500.00	₱203,626,500.00	₱0.00	–₱188,626,500.00	–₱96,120,425.80
Super Lotto 6/49	2,330,636	2,523	2,328,113	₱349,595,400.00	₱349,595,400.00	₱0.00	–₱324,595,400.00	₱291,059,417.60
Grand Lotto 6/55	7,247,419	7,844	7,239,575	₱724,741,875.00	₱724,762,500.00	–₱20,625.00	–₱679,741,875.00	₱16,434,448.20
Ultra Lotto 6/58	10,118,840	10,952	10,107,888	₱1,011,883,950.00	₱1,011,895,500.00	–₱11,550.00	–₱936,883,950.00	₱168,738,558.00

- Lotto 6/42 is the flagship lotto draw, first introduced on March 8, 1995. The game was initially introduced in Luzon, with a separate game for "VisMin" (Visayas and Mindanao) geographical regions as a single unit. The two draws were later combined into a nationwide one in November 9, 2004. As the name states, a six-number combination is chosen from a lot of numbers from 1 to 42. To win a prize, at least three of one's chosen numbers must match with those of the six winning numbers. Its minimum jackpot is PHP10,000,000.00 (was ₱6,000,000 until January 31, 2026). The odds of getting all six winning numbers, and thus the jackpot, are 1 in 5,245,786. Draws are held on Tuesdays, Thursdays, and Saturdays. On June 3, 2025, its largest jackpot won was PHP102,346,298.00 by one bettor. First winner of minimum jackpot since February 1, 2026 occurred on March 21, 2026.
- Mega Lotto 6/45 was introduced on May 17, 1997, and a more improved version of the 6/42 draw and is also introduced as a nationwide one. As the name states, a six-number combination is chosen from a lot of numbers from 1 to 45. As with 6/42, at least three of one's chosen numbers must appear among the six winning numbers to win a prize. Its minimum jackpot is PHP15,000,000.00 (was ₱9,000,000 until January 31, 2026). The odds of getting all six winning numbers are much larger at 1 in 8,145,060. Draws are held on Mondays, Wednesdays, and Fridays. On November 6, 2023, its largest jackpot won was PHP107,506,074.20 by one bettor. First winner of minimum jackpot since February 1, 2026 occurred on February 18, 2026. The most number of won bettors in one jackpot prize of Mega Lotto 6/45 is 3, which occurred on October 9, 2026 and on October 23, 2026.
- Super Lotto 6/49 was introduced on July 16, 2000, further decreasing odds and making winning more difficult than the previous two, this time with a lot of numbers ranging from 1 to 49. Draw mechanics are the same. Its minimum jackpot is PHP25,000,000.00 (was ₱16,000,000 until January 31, 2026). The odds of winning are now higher at 1 in 13,983,816. Draws are held on Tuesdays, Thursdays, and Sundays. On January 17, 2024, its largest jackpot won was PHP640,654,817.60 by one bettor. First winner of minimum jackpot since February 1, 2026 occurred on May 10, 2026. The most number of won bettors in one jackpot prize of Super Lotto 6/49 is 2, which occurred on April 4, 2024.
- Grand Lotto 6/55 was introduced on April 18, 2010. Draw mechanics are the same as the previous three, but this time, the number lot is from 1 to 55. The Grand Lotto draw currently uses the larger of the two-chamber Power Lotto Saturn Machine. While its minimum jackpot is pegged at ₱45,000,000.00 (was ₱30,000,000 until January 31, 2026), it had the Power Lotto's ₱108,000,000.00 final jackpot as its jackpot prize on its first draw. The odds are at 1 in 28,989,675. Draws are held on Mondays, Wednesdays, and Saturdays. On November 29, 2010, a single bettor wins the jackpot prize of ₱741,176,323.20, making it the second largest jackpot prize won. First winners of minimum jackpot since February 1, 2026 occurred on February 21, 2026 for 2 winners and on March 9, 2026 for 1 winner. Also, for the first time in history, (Note: History of lottery draw in the Philippines and, possibly, internationally or around the World.) on October 1, 2022, a jackpot prize worth ₱236,091,188.40 was divided among 433 winners. The winning numbers are said to be divisible by 9, as the results were 9, 45, 36, 27, 18, 54. Others claimed it was an error or system glitch of winners.
- Ultra Lotto 6/58 is the most recent of all the lottery draw. It was launched on February 7, 2015. Its first draw was on February 8, 2015. Draw mechanics are the same as the previous four, but this time, the number is from 1 to 58. The draw of February 8, 2015, to February 12, 2017, was held on Fridays and Sundays only. Starting February 14, 2017, draws are now held on Tuesdays, Fridays, and Sundays. Making the pari-mutuel games of Lotto 6/42 and Super Lotto 6/49 extended as three pari-mutuel games every Tuesdays only. Its minimum jackpot is PHP75,000,000.00 (was ₱49,500,000 until January 31, 2026). The odds are, at their highest, at 1 in 40,475,358. On October 14, 2018, two bettors from Albay and Samar split the ₱1,180,622,508.00 (US$21,862,177.00) jackpot, the largest won. Largest won by one bettor was PHP571,554,916.40, which occurred on December 29, 2023. There is no winner of minimum jackpot since February 1, 2026; however, the last winner of minimum jackpot before its change on February 1, 2026 occurred on September 14, 2025. The most number of won bettors in one jackpot prize of Ultra Lotto 6/58 is 10, which occurred on May 5, 2026.

There are also two-numbered and three-, four-, and six-digit lottery games. Unlike the number lottery games, the digits must appear in "exact order", i.e. in the order of the numbered chambers from which each digit is drawn.

Summary of betting payment per betting ticket per draw
Game	Price per betting ticket (Note: PERM, ROLL 1, and ROLL 4 cannot be used simultaneously. Only one of the three.)		
Game	Normal	PERM	ROLL 1 or ROLL 4
4D Lotto	₱10.00	₱240.00	₱100.00
6D Lotto	₱10.00	–	–

Summary of maximum betting payments per betting slip
Game	Number of betting tickets per betting slip	Maximum betting price per betting slip (Note: 6 draws. Amount set at PHP500.00 per betting ticket.)
4D Lotto	6	₱432,000.00
6D Lotto	5	₱15,000.00

Summary of jackpot winnings and fixed payout for 4D Lotto
Jackpot		Fixed payout	
Minimum	Largest	Last 3 digits	Last 2 digits
₱10,000.00	₱155,894.00	₱800.00	₱100.00

Summary of jackpot winnings and fixed payout for 6D Lotto
Jackpot		Fixed payout			
Minimum	Largest	First 5 or last 5 digits	First 4 or last 4 digits	First 3 or last 3 digits	First 2 or last 2 digits
₱150,000.00	₱8,962,388.00	₱40,000.00	₱4,000.00	₱400.00	₱40.00

Summary of when betting all combinations
Game	Number of betting slips needed			Amount needed			Difference from the jackpot	
Game	Non-PERM	PERM	Difference	Non-PERM	PERM	Difference	Minimum	Largest
4D Lotto	1,667	70	1,597	₱100,000.00	₱100,080.00	–₱80.00	–₱90,000.00	₱55,894.00
6D Lotto	200,000	–	–	₱10,000,000.00	–	–	–₱9,850,000.00	–₱1,037,612.00

- 4D Lotto was introduced on August 4, 1997, and uses a four-chambered Mega Gem, with each chamber drawing a digit from 0 to 9. To win, one must have at least the last two digits of the winning combination. The odds of winning are 1 in 10,000. Draws are held on Mondays, Wednesdays, and Fridays.
- 6D Lotto is a game in the style of a traditional sweepstakes. It was also introduced on December 11, 1997, draws six digits from six Orbits. To win, one must have at least the first or last two digits of the winning combination in exact order. Odds in winning are increased at 1 in 1,000,000. Originally played in Luzon areas only, it has expanded to a nationwide draw since February 11, 2020. Draws are held on Tuesdays, Thursdays, and Saturdays.

=== Fixed payout games ===
Summary of betting payment per betting ticket per draw
Game	Price per betting ticket	
Game	Minimum	Maximum
2D Lotto	₱10.00	₱500.00
3D Lotto	₱10.00	₱500.00

Summary of maximum betting payments per betting slip
Game	Number of betting tickets per betting slip	Maximum betting price per betting slip (Note: 6 draws. Amount set at PHP500.00 per betting ticket.)
2D Lotto	6	₱9,000.00
3D Lotto	6	₱18,000.00

Summary of prize
Game	Prize (Note: Amount set to PHP10.00 per ticket.)			
Game	Normal	Rambolito	Rambolito 3	Rambolito 6
2D Lotto	₱4,000.00	₱2,000.00	−	−
3D Lotto	₱4,500.00	−	₱1,500.00	₱750.00

Summary of when betting all combinations
Game	Number of betting slips needed			Amount needed			Difference from the prize
Game	Non-Rambolito	Rambolito	Difference	Non-Rambolito	Rambolito	Difference	Difference from the prize
2D Lotto	321	161	160	₱9,610.00	₱9,610.00	₱0.00	–₱5,610.00
3D Lotto	167	7	160	₱10,000.00	₱10,000.00	₱0.00	–₱5,500.00

- 3D Lotto was launched on June 13, 2002, as Swertres Lotto, a portmanteau of the words swerte (Filipino for luck) and tres (Spanish for three), in Visayas and Mindanao (later expanded to Luzon in 2006). It uses three Gems, each drawing a digit from 0 to 9. The 3D Lotto game is drawn 3 (three) times daily, Monday-Sunday. Originally, the nationwide draws are in the morning (11 AM), afternoon (4 PM), and evening (9 PM). Since August 24, 2020, the new timeslot are adjusted to 2:00 PM, 5:00 PM, and 9:00 PM (all timeslots are live). This game is arguably the most popular among the fixed payout games, garnering a solid following in social media, especially through a variety of Facebook groups.

A multitude of websites have also been created and are updated regularly after the morning, afternoon, and evening draws are recorded. Most of these websites also try to compile and pseudo-analyze results based on prevailing results and techniques used by bettors in the game—this despite the results having been randomly drawn.

- 2D Lotto was launched on July 5, 2004, as EZ2 Lotto in Luzon (later expanded to Visayas and Mindanao in 2006). It uses two Standard Dailies, each of which draws a number from a lot of 1 to 31, ensuring no possibility of the same number appearing twice in a combination or a double. To win the jackpot, one must have the two numbers in exact order as they appear in the chambers. The odds of getting the exact order are 1 in 961. The odds in LLAVE order are 1 in 465. Therefore 465 numbers are LLave (Rambol) (01-02, 02–01). Just like the 3D Lotto, the 2D Lotto is drawn 3 (three) times daily (2PM, 5PM, and 9PM), Monday-Sunday.

=== Small Town Lottery games ===
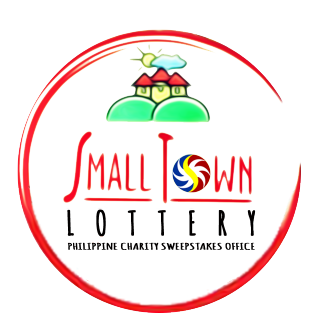
Logo of the PCSO's Small Town Lottery

From November 15, 2017, to March 17, 2020 (11 AM), centralized Small Town Lottery games were added to the show. The results of these draws were for provinces that did not have a local franchise of STL. The Small Town Lottery games are also held three times daily. Originally, the centralized Small Town Lottery was held every 11 AM, 4 PM, and 9 PM. The Small Town Lottery ceased conducting a centralized draw. Instead, it conducts a localized draw, with separate games for Visayas and Mindanao only (every 10:30 AM, 3 PM, and 7 PM).

- STL Pares uses a single-chambered machine, which draws two numbers from 1 to 40. After the first number is drawn, the machine restarted to draw the second number. To win a prize, one must match the numbers in exact order.
- STL Swer3 uses a three-chamber machine, with each one drawing a number from 0 to 9. Until October 1, 2019(4 PM), it is originally single-chambered, but now it uses three separate chambers. It is similar to 3D Lotto in gameplay.
- STL Swer2 uses a two-chamber machine, each one drawing a number from 0 to 9. Like STL Swer3, it is also originally single-chambered, until October 1, 2019(4 PM), and is formerly known as STL 2-Digits.

As of September 2023, the Small Town Lottery Authorized Agent Corporations (AAC) listed some areas from Visayas and Mindanao will be used for the National Draw Results for their operations.

=== Defunct games ===
- Power Lotto 5-55+1 was introduced on June 17, 2008, and used 1 Saturn and 1 Gem, the Saturn draws 5 numbers out of 55 balls numbered from 1 to 55, and the Gem draws one ball out of 10 balls numbered from 1 to 10 for the power number. Its minimum jackpot is PHP 50,000,000.00. The odds of winning the jackpot are at 1 in 34,787,610. It was replaced by Grand Lotto 6/55 in April 2010.
- Bingo Milyonaryo was introduced in 2013, not only it was played at 9pm, it was also played during the 11am and 4pm draws. The first 4 machines (B, I, N, and G) are numbers 0 to 9 while the other 2 machines (O and M) are numbers 0 to 38. It was discontinued in 2015 in favor of Ultra Lotto 6/58.

== Hosts ==
=== Current hosts ===
- Mari De Leon
- Jerome Sang
- Queen Semana
- Jhay Torres
- Nyca Bernardo
- Tracy Perez
- William Thio
- Fiona Gicale
- Jasmine Omay
- Ashlee Tuason
- Than Perez
- Zac Papin
- Eve Valdez
- Mark Reyes
- Adam Resurreccion
- Leslie Ordinario

=== Former hosts ===
- Katherine de Leon (1995–2004)
- Tina Revilla (1999–2004)
- Timmy Cruz (2000–2004)
- Erik Imson (2004–2023; moved to GMA Network)
- Dindo de Viterbo (2004–2021; moved to TV5)
- Joel Pastores (2004–2014; moved to Net 25)
- Jasper Espino (2004–2023; moved to Net 25)
- Romi Sison (2004–2023; moved to TV5)
- Tonette Escario (2004–2014; moved to Net 25)
- Dr. Jun Dequina (2004–2014; moved to GMA Network)
- Charisse de Castro (2011–2017)
- Shelly Anne Busque (2011–2014)
- Trixie Abogado (2011–2014)
- Pilar Pinga Cruz (2015–2020)
- Rizza De Leon (2018–2020)
- Queenie Balita-Aranas (2015–2023)
- Fe Celebrado III (2017–2023)
- Sherrie Pamintuan (2011–2023)
- Princess Laurel-Elefante (2023)
- Gina Donato (2023)
- Baileys Acot (2023–2024)
- Samantha Ashley Lo (2024–2025)
- MJ Reyes (2025)

== Production timeline ==
- July 27, 2019: the program was put on temporary hiatus following a verbal order from President Rodrigo Duterte to suspend all gambling-related operations of PCSO along with the MTRCB's Live on PTV 4, due to corruption allegations. However, the program was partially resumed on July 31 when the suspension of the lotto games was lifted by the President. The Small Town Lottery remained suspended until August 22, 2019.
- March 17, 2020: the program was put into temporary hiatus for the second time, as PCSO gaming operations and small-town lotteries in Luzon (later expanded to Visayas and Mindanao on April 7) were suspended following the implementation of the enhanced community quarantine in Luzon amid the COVID-19 pandemic in the Philippines. The program once again partially resumed on July 20, 2020, to hold catch-up draws for all tickets sold prior to the suspension of the gaming operations during the enhanced community quarantine. The program fully resumed, along with PCSO's lotto operations, on August 7 (originally scheduled on August 4) in areas already under general community quarantine (GCQ) and modified general community quarantine (MGCQ), The Small Town Lottery, among other games, remained suspended.
- July 30, 2022: the program was reformatted into a better and more organized version that included the following segments: Usapang STL, What You Should Know, Charity in Action, PCSO News Blitz, and Recap Time.
- October 1, 2023: the program was relaunched with a "Love The Philippines" inspired theme, in partnership with the Department of Tourism.
- November 18, 2023: the hosts went into a transition, from PCSO employees, to beauty pageant contestants, artists, and social media personalities.
- February 19, 2024: the program reformats its Jackpot Games. For every draw of the jackpot-bearing games, PCSO's data center conducts the encoding of winning numbers and updating jackpot winners from the Remote Access Management Terminal or RAMT based on the new Lottery System and E-Lotto.
- December 31, 2024: PCSO Lottery Draw started airing live on IBC and D8TV.
- June 17, 2025: it flashes the copyright notices.

== See also ==
- Philippine Charity Sweepstakes Office
- Gambling in the Philippines
