= DXBE =

DXBE may refer to:

- DXBE-FM, an FM radio station broadcasting in Davao City, branded as XFM
- DXBE-TV, a television radio station broadcasting in Zamboanga City, branded as BEAM TV
