= Panahon.TV =

- Walang pinipiling panahon ang pagbibigay impormasyon
- Directed by: Julius Melo
- Country of origin: Philippines

Production
- Executive producer: Donna May Lina
- Production locations: PAGASA Weather and Flood Forecasting Center Building, Diliman, Quezon City
- Running time: 1 hour (5:00 a.m. edition); 30 minutes (6:00 a.m. rebroadcast); 2-3 minutes (Panahon.TV Express)
- Production company: UBE Media

Original release
- Network: PTV (2012–2016); DZRH News Television (2013–2019); Pilipinas HD (2017–2019); Life TV (2017–2019); One PH (2019–2020)
- Release: September 10, 2012 – September 11, 2023

Related
- PAGASA I-Weather

Panahon.TV is a Philippine television news broadcasting show broadcast by PTV, DZRH News Television, Pilipinas HD, Life TV and One PH. Originally hosted by April Enerio, Jemmah Amor Larrosa and Meg Siozon, it aired from September 10, 2012 to September 11, 2023. Angelique Agarap, Francis Orcio and Pia Mercado serve as the final hosts. The program aired every Monday to Friday at 5:00 AM (UTC+8) directly from the PAGASA Weather and Flood Forecasting Center in Quezon City.

Co-produced by the Philippine Atmospheric, Geophysical and Astronomical Services Administration (PAGASA), along with UBE Media, the communication arm of the Lina Group of Companies, and Air 21, Panahon.TV aimed to deliver timely weather updates to its audience.

Panahon.TV also offered Panahon.TV Express, a supplementary segment airing Monday to Friday at 6:00 PM. During weather disturbances within the Philippine Area of Responsibility, the program provided live coverage of press conferences from the PAGASA Weather Center, often extending the Express editions until midnight to keep viewers informed.

== Developments ==
Panahon.TV also had a mobile application available for free download on Android and iOS devices. In addition to television and the mobile app, Panahon.TV supplied weather information and news on DWIZ 882 kHz and DZIQ 990 kHz on AM radio, major newspapers and magazines including Philippine Daily Inquirer, Inquirer Libre, Inquirer Bandera, Inquirer Golf, The Philippine Star, BusinessWorld, The Manila Times, Pilipino Mirror, BusinessMirror, United Daily News, United Daily Press, Cebu Daily News and Philippines Graphic. Outdoor advertising through Inquirer Catalyst Media and online websites also featured Panahon.TV.

Despite the program no longer airing on television, Panahon.TV continued to provide weather updates on its social media pages in cooperation with PAGASA.

== Personalities ==
=== Final Hosts ===
- Angelique Agarap (2022–2023)
- Francis Orcio (2022–2023) (moved to One PH, now with ABS-CBN News)
- Pia Mercado (2022–2023)

=== Former Hosts ===
- April Enerio (2012–2015)
- Aubrey Ner (2014)
- Earle Figuarcion (2014)
- Jemmah Amor Larrosa (2012–2018) (now with GMA Integrated News)
- Jesy Basco (2014–2016)
- Juliet Caranguian
- Harry Bayona (2013−2015)
- Meg Siozon (2012) (now with PTV)
- Rachel Pelayo
- Desserie Dionio
- Kathy San Gabriel (now with Super Radyo DZBB 594 AM)
- Dale Cabuquin (2019)
- Patrick Obsuna (2018–2021)
- Trisha Garin (2018–2022) (now with Bilyonaryo News Channel)
- Mark Jiao (2021–2022)

=== Former Segments ===
- Laging Handa
- Tamang Oras
- Sigla
- Ang Mundo ng Pagasa
- Ulat Pang-Mulat

== See also ==
- Weather forecasting
