= Pentecostal Missionary Church of Christ (4th Watch) =

Christian denomination in the Philippines

- Location: Marikina, Metro Manila (Main Church)
- Country: Philippines
- Denomination: Pentecostal
- Website: pmcc4thwatch.org

History
- Founded: 1972
- Founder: Arsenio Tan Ferriol

The Pentecostal Missionary Church of Christ (4th Watch), also known as PMCC (4th Watch), is a Pentecostal Christian denomination based in the Philippines. It was founded in 1972 by Arsenio T. Ferriol, who would become its executive minister, and took on the title of apostle, registered on August 30, 1973.

The church claims to be the "One True Church of Christ", with its beliefs coming from the Bible as the sole basis for all its doctrines and prophecies about the "Church of Jesus Christ" established by a living modern-day Apostle in the modern era (whereas the church doctrine calls it "The 4th Watch"; Filipino: Ikaapat na Pagpupuyat). The denomination, whose headquarters and largest church located in Marikina, has an estimated million members worldwide.

== History ==
PMCC (4th Watch) was founded in 1972 by Arsenio Tan Ferriol (January 14, 1936 – May 19, 2024), a native of Odiongan, Romblon, who later became the church's first chief executive minister. It was said that Ferriol had been doing his evangelization activities since the late 1950s.

The church had separated from the Foursquare Gospel, a North American–based Pentecostal church, where Arsenio and his brother, Arturo, had been Bible students in their youth and later trained pastors, and later forming the People's Missionary Church (a small community church in Marikina) prior to another split and its registration. As a result, the church, being indigenous, is independent of Western Pentecostalism. The church was officially registered as its current name to the Philippine government's Securities and Exchange Commission in August 1973, the event being commemorated as its establishment.

Another brother, Domingo (1943–2021), pioneered one of the first church buildings in Malagasang, Imus, Cavite; while Arturo later led the construction of the main church in Marikina (then part of Rizal). The church expanded abroad through visits by mid-1980s, and with the first foreign church established in Hong Kong in 1989, the same year it also reached North America.

PMCC, being one of the fastest growing independent denomination in the country and in Asia, (Note: As mentioned by PMCC bishop and church's deputy executive minister Jonathan Ferriol during the 50th anniversary celebration, citing a study by the University of Cambridge in England.) eventually became one of the largest indigenous Pentecostal churches, having a nationwide presence in almost every city and province. By the time of the church's 50th anniversary, PMCC has been present in 72 countries worldwide with 1,055 locale churches. (Note: As mentioned by PMCC bishop Aldrin Palanca during the 50th anniversary celebration.) Members are known for being missionaries because of their house visits and public preaching in areas (markets, buses and parks) elsewhere.

PMCC publishes The Word magazine (founded in 1989), and broadcasts programs including Oras ng Katotohanan (transl. Hour of Truth) and its United States counterpart Surer Word (established in 2008 as the church's first overseas all-English program). It owns Life Radio network and once had its own television station, Life TV.

On August 27, 2023, the church held its 50th anniversary celebration in New Clark City Athletics Stadium in Capas, Tarlac, which was attended by at least 42,000 members and nearly 3,000 ministers.

Arsenio's wife and six children are currently serving in high positions in the church, with his son Jonathan succeeding him as the chief executive minister after his death in 2024.

== Beliefs ==
PMCC believes that the one true church was founded on the day of Pentecost, as mentioned in the Book of Acts; and the spiritual gifts (as mentioned in Ephesians 4:11) by the Holy Spirit in the church continues to this day, including the apostleship, which is believed the most important and to be given by Jesus Christ to Arsenio Ferriol (thus, the "apostle in the end-time;" and being the Goodman of the House, citing Matthew 24:43).

The restoration of spiritual gifts is emphasized by the PMCC, which defined Pentecostal as reverting to the early Christian Church in the Book of Acts. They prefer to be called "Biblical Pentecostalism", with the church's name indicating its general direction; the term is said restoring the Pentecostalism generally with adherence to biblical teachings needed to achieve unity, and increases the indigenization as well, maintaining its independence.

PMCC believes that the fourth watch mystery was revealed only to Ferriol. Citing Mark 13, it was stated that the New Testament times constituted four periods of time: Apostolic era (or ancient era; evening watch, referred to as 1st watch); Papacy (medieval era/Dark Ages; midnight, 2nd); Reformation (Renaissance; rooster-crowing, 3rd); end-time (New Age; morning, 4th and last). The latter is said to be the present day and that the Second Coming of Jesus is about to occur; wherein baptized members are to be saved through rapture, leaving apostates to experience the Great Tribulation. Ferriol, being the leader, claimed God commanded him through voice and light one evening in 1970 in Odiongan, giving him the revelation through Jesus to restore the original church in the modern era, hence, its name.

PMCC believes in the Father, the Son and the Holy Spirit (all as God, but not a Trinity); the humanity of Jesus who, according to them, emptied Himself during the first incarnation, as well as the Personality of the Holy Spirit. Their teachings also involve the fulfillment of the Great Commission which includes preaching the gospel of salvation—which is through Jesus' finished work demonstrated by his suffering, death, and resurrection; and is attained only by grace—and baptism by immersion.

Also, one of their beliefs is the infallibility of the Bible as the final authority.

== Outreach ==
=== Media ===
End-Time Mission Broadcasting Service (EMBS) is a radio and television broadcasting division of the PMCC through its Resources for Doctrinal Empowerment and Evangelistic Ministry (ReDEEM). Its corporate office is located in Marikina. EMBS owns three radio stations under the Life Radio brand, and its television network Life TV.

PMCC's media ministry can be traced back to its flagship program, Oras ng Katotohanan (Hour of Truth), which started in the 1980s on radio (through DWXX in 1985) and later on television (through IBC on October 18, 1991 and later on SBN in 2004 and PTV on August 11, 2013).

==== Life TV ====
Life TV
- Country: Philippines
- Broadcast area: Philippines
- Headquarters: Marikina

Programming
- Languages: English, Filipino
- Picture format: 1080i (HDTV) (downscaled to 16:9 480i for the SDTV feed)

History
- Launched: October 3, 2016
- Closed: June 1, 2025
- Replaced by: D8TV (xx.06 digital channel space)

Links
- Website: www.pmcc4w.org/life-tv

Life TV was launched on October 3, 2016, coinciding with the 25th anniversary of ONK's TV broadcast. It formerly aired 24 hours a day on SkyCable and Cignal TV. Life TV currently broadcasts in English and Filipino via BEAM TV's DTT subchannel daily from 5 am to 12 mn, and through their online livestreaming. Since 2017, Life TV became the second religious channel (next to Iglesia ni Cristo Television) known for broadcasting the station's digital clock during the entire course of its broadcast. It is headquartered in Marikina. Life TV ceased operations on June 1, 2025 as their broadcast shifted to digital and social media platforms through 4th Watch Media and the return of Oras ng Katotohanan on free-to-air television which began airing on TV5 since August 17, 2025.

===== Programming =====
Life TV's programming consisted of its in-house produced shows as well as imported from various productions. Selected programs were aired on BEAM TV UHF Channel 31.

Final programming

- Oras ng Katotohanan – the flagship program of PMCC (4th Watch) in the Philippines.
- Surer Word – the U.S. program produced by PMCC (4th Watch) South Bay, California. (formerly a segment of Oras ng Katotohanan)
- The Truth (formerly a segment of Oras ng Katotohanan)
- Bible Connection
- The Word Today
- Gospel of Salvation
- The Living Word
- Home Free Radio (2020)
- Chords of Mercy (2017)
- Chords of Mercy UNLTD.
- Tuklasin Natin
- Prayer Power (formerly a segment of Oras ng Katotohanan)
- Moments with God (2018)
- Pag-ibig nga Naman (2017)
- Music of the Heart (2017)
- Life at Home
- Kalinga On-Air
- Pray-A-Thon
- May Plano ang Dios
- The Lord's Day
- Church Update (formerly a segment of Oras ng Katotohanan)
- Psalms, Verses & Inspirations (2018)
- Worship Sessions
- Grave. Grace. Glory. (special program aired every Holy Week)
- SciShow
- SciShow Space
- SciShow Kids
- The Bible Project
- Alla's Yummy Food
- Awesome Eats
- The Traveler's Guide

Select church events are also being aired annually, including:

- Meditations for Christmas (aired days prior to and on Christmas Day)
- International Missionary Day
- Opening ceremony of the International Convention
- Home Free Global Crusades (since 2020)

Previous programming

- Panahon.TV (via syndication; 2017–2023)
- Daily Watch (station's only secular newscast)
- Church at Home
- Kaban ng Patotoo
- Hubblecast
- Wow HD Technology
- TBN Asia Block
- Morning Devotion
- Family Devotion
- Midweek Service
- Sunday School
- Evangelistic Service

Broadcast in line with the church's 50th anniversary:

- PMCC (4th Watch) at 50: Golden Anniversary News Program (July–August 2023)
- Golden Anniversary Celebration (Aug. 27, 2023)

==== Life Radio ====
Life Radio
- Luzon; Philippines

History
- First air date: January 7, 2013

Links
- Webcast: Listen Live
- Website: www.liferadio.embs.asia

Life Radio is the ministry's radio service, broadcasting across the Luzon area.

===== Life Radio stations =====
Life Radio stations
Branding	Call sign	Frequency	Power (kW)	Location	First air date
Life Radio Philippines	—N/a	Listen Live		Worldwide	
Life Radio Northern Luzon	DWET	1179 kHz	10 kW	Santiago	2014
Life Radio Southern Luzon	DZAT	1512 kHz	10 kW	Lucena	2005

=== Others ===
The church, while conducting prayer crusades, has also been active in social work, with activities including medical, disaster response, and educational outreach.

The church's ministerial arm, Maranatha Bible School International, was established by Arturo Ferriol in 1975, while its educational ministry began in 1980.

PMCC's Dalaw Kalinga Foundation held its first medical mission in 1997.

== Pentecostalism in the Philippines ==
The definition of Pentecostalism is emphasized on the deep personal spiritual experience and expressive worship, among others. The exact number of Pentecostals are difficult to identify for the reasons that most country censuses have no comparison among the Christianity except for Protestantism and Catholicism; and Pentecostalism, as a movement, may only exist as distinct and non-mainstream congregations. A study by Pew Research Center in 2011, although reported that there are no data on exact number of Pentecostals in the Christian-dominated Philippines, estimated it at 2.2 million. Aside from PMCC (4th Watch), another known Pentecostal group in the country is the Jesus Is Lord Church.

There had been three United States–based Pentecostal movements which sent missionaries to the then US-administered Philippines. The Foursquare Gospel, the church where the PMCC separated from, was the last to do so in 1937.
