= My Movie Channel =

Cable & satellite television network

- My Movie Channel logo used from 2013 to 2015
- Country: Philippines
- Broadcast area: Defunct
- Headquarters: Mandaluyong, Philippines

Programming
- Picture format: 480i (SDTV)

Ownership
- Owner: Solar Entertainment Corporation
- Sister channels: BTV, CT, Jack TV, Solar Sports, NBA Premium TV

History
- Launched: January 3, 2013 (test broadcast); January 19, 2013 (full launch as Blink Cinema); November 30, 2013 (launched as My Movie Channel)
- Closed: June 30, 2015
- Former names: Blink Cinema (January–November 2013)

My Movie Channel (formerly Blink Cinema) was a 24-hour Filipino cable and satellite television network based in Shaw Boulevard, Mandaluyong. Owned by Solar Entertainment Corporation, it airs movies from Hollywood and around the world, while also airing entertainment news programs, talk shows and drama series.

== History ==
=== January 2013: Blink Cinema ===
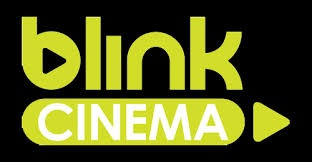
Logo as Blink Cinema from January 3 to November 29, 2013

Blink Cinema was launched on January 3, 2013, with the full broadcast taking effect later that month.

=== November 2013: My Movie Channel ===
The channel was renamed as My Movie Channel on November 30, 2013, coinciding with the transfer of ETC to SBN and former sister channel Solar News Channel's move to RPN 9, as well as the launch of Solar's video-on-demand website Blink. On March 1, 2015, the channel replaced former sister channel TGC on various cable providers, following the latter's end of operations on February 28, 2015. After almost 2 years of broadcasting, My Movie Channel announced that they will cease broadcasting on television effective June 30, 2015, and gave thanks to its viewers before they signed off on July 1, 2015.

== Programming ==
The channel's programming mainly consists of movies from major Hollywood film studios, while foreign films are aired on its weekly "World Cinema" block on weekdays. It also airs entertainment news programs, US talk shows, and US TV series, the latter of which are shown on its "Series at Six" block.

=== U.S. TV series ===
==== Drama series ====
- Mr Selfridge
- NCIS

==== Talk shows ====
- Inside the Actors Studio
- The Tonight Show Starring Jimmy Fallon
- The Tonight Show with Jay Leno

==== Entertainment News ====
- Entertainment Tonight
- The Insider

== See also ==
- Solar Entertainment Corporation
- ETC
- 2nd Avenue
- Movie Central
