= Telenovela Channel =

Defunct Philippine television channel

- Country: Philippines
- Broadcast area: Defunct
- Headquarters: Makati, Metro Manila

Programming
- Language: English
- Picture format: 480i (SDTV)

Ownership
- Owner: Beginnings at Twenty Plus, Inc., joint venture with TelevisaUnivision

History
- Launched: August 2011 (first test broadcast); September 30, 2011 (regular broadcast); November 14, 2011 (full channel launch)
- Replaced: Jack TV (Cignal channel space)
- Closed: March 1, 2024; 2 years ago

Links
- Website: telenovelachannel.com

Telenovela Channel (informally abbreviated TNC, stylized as TeleNovela Channel) was a telenovela-based cable channel in the Philippine network owned by Beginnings at Twenty Plus, Inc. under a joint venture with TelevisaUnivision. The network launched in the summer of 2011 with test broadcast before fully launching on November 14, 2011. The network ceased operations on March 1, 2024.

== History ==
=== Beginning of the broadcast of telenovelas in the Philippines ===
During the 1990s, the Philippines started to air Latin American telenovelas on free-to-air television networks including RPN 9 (since 1994 with La Traidora), ABS-CBN 2 (since 1996 with Maria Mercedes), ABC 5 (now TV5, since 1996 with Morena Clara), GMA 7 (since 1996 with Agujetas de color de rosa) and IBC 13 (since 2001 with Por un beso). The telenovelas aired on Philippine television, especially those produced in Mexico, were dubbed in Filipino and were shown in primetime and afternoon slots.

However, the late 2000s saw the dwindling popularity of the Latin American telenovelas.

=== Channel launch and initial programming (2011–2013) ===
Beginnings at 20 Plus, Inc. launched a channel dedicated to Mexican telenovelas in 2011. Beginnings at 20 Plus, Inc. is a multi-media company that produces concerts, events and offers television production services as well. The company produced the dubbed Tagalog version of the Chinese historical drama series Judge Bao in 2007–2008, aired on ABC-5.

A landmark agreement between Beginnings at 20 Plus, Inc. and Mexican network Televisa marked the start of a new channel dedicated to telenovelas. On November 14, 2011, Telenovela Channel started its maiden broadcast with In the Name of Love, The Two Sides of Ana, Passion and La Madrastra. These telenovelas were dubbed in Tagalog and were aired in original Spanish audio as well until 2013 as the new telenovelas were dubbed in English.

The year 2012 saw the introduction of new telenovelas as well. These are A Woman's Word, Big Love, and Love Spell. The same year also marked the return of Marimar, this time on cable via this channel. With its aim to be a purely Filipino telenovela cable channel, Spanish audio versions of the telenovelas were stopped in order to give way to Tagalog dubbed shows. On August 13 to 19, 2012, episodes of various telenovelas were aired again by viewers' request due to brownouts caused by strong monsoon rains (Habagat) on August 7 to 9, 2012.

=== Transition to English audio and programming changes (2013–2016) ===
In 2013, the channel made a major shift as the new telenovelas acquired are now dubbed in English starting with Soy tu dueña and Rafaela. In June 2013, the channel's airtime was reduced to give way to Home TV shopping blocktimer TeleVShop which was later replaced by TV Shop Philippines in 2014.

On June 2, 2014, the telenovela returned on Free TV as The Two Sides of Ana (Dalawang Mukha ni Ana) during ATC@IBC-13 block. On July 7, 2014, Telenovela Channel launched the return of the popular telenovela Cuidado con el ángel, under the English title Don't Mess with an Angel. The said telenovela already aired on ABS-CBN as Maria de Jesus: Ang Anghel sa Lansangan, dubbed in Tagalog from 2009 until it ended in 2010. Also in 2014, reruns of last 5-10 episodes of each telenovela were aired, afterwards a new telenovela was replaced. As of 2015, no full-length reruns of telenovelas aired after the rerun of The One who Couldn't Love. Since April 2015, all telenovelas and an anthology are aired in English.

=== Exploring new genres and remakes (2017–2019) ===
On January 16, 2017, Telenovela Channel aired its first and only non-telenovela program The Rose of Guadalupe, an anthology featuring standalone inspirational stories each episode. Three new novelas subsequently aired on summer: Head Over Heels, I Don't Trust Men Anymore and La Malquerida.

For the first time, Telenovela Channel launched its first and only Brazilian telenovela Carrossel, which is a remake of the 1989 telenovela Carrusel. The telenovela, produced by SBT and distributed by Televisa (for international markets), replaced I Don't Trust Men Anymore on October 23, 2017. With 252 episodes using the international version (instead of 310 in the original airing), this is the overall longest-running telenovela aired on TNC, although Big Love (2012–2013) remains the longest running Mexican soap opera with 205 episodes.

Two programs premiered on New Year's Day of 2018: My Heart is Yours and The Color of Passion. I Don't Trust Men Anymore had its repeat broadcast on July 2, 2018, the first program to have a full run rerun since The One who Couldn't Love in 2015. Secrets at the Hotel was launched on September 3, 2018, replacing La Rosa de Guadalupe. This is the second-period soap opera the channel aired after Passion in 2011. Simply María, a remake of the 1989 telenovela (already aired on RPN from 1996 to 1997), was launched on September 17, 2018. Fooled Into Love and Ask God for Forgiveness Not Me premiered in late November as 2018 draws to an end.

Telenovela Channel aired the program Corazón indomable under the title Wild at Heart in January 2019. The said telenovela was already shown on GMA Network in 2015, with a slightly reduced number of episodes along with Tagalog audio. This is the third time a previously Tagalog-dubbed telenovela on free TV will be aired in English on TNC after Don't Mess with an Angel and Rubi. Wild at Heart is based on the 1994 telenovela Marimar which was broadcast on TNC in 2012. Alongside with it is the launch of The Stray Cat, which is produced by Nathalie Lartilleux, the same producer of Wild at Heart.

In June 2019, Telenovela Channel premiered three telenovelas on the same day: The Three Sides of Ana, Las Amazonas and Unforgivable. In September 2019, Telenovela Channel aired telenovelas The Neighbor and Passion and Power which was the last telenovela that famous actor Fernando Colunga starred in Televisa until 2023.

=== COVID-19 pandemic programming interruption (2020) ===
In January 2020, three new programs premiered: Anything But Plain, Shadows of the Past and Along Came Love. Due to the Enhanced Community Quarantine imposed by the Philippine government, as a preventive measure to the COVID-19 pandemic, office operations were affected and thus the channel was forced to air reruns from April to June 2020 except Passion and Power which finished its broadcast in early April followed by a rerun of the program's last few weeks until May. In July 2020, Telenovela Channel resumed regular programming with new episodes. After the three new shows ended their runs in October–November, the channel aired reruns of The Neighbor, Passion and Power, The Three Sides of Ana and Las Amazonas.

=== New titles and new normal programming (2021–2023) ===
In February 2021, Telenovela Channel premiered two new programs: Sightless Love and Fall Into Temptation. It was then followed by My Husband's Family in May, Lying Heart in June and the two telenovelas, The Candidate and In Love with Ramón in July. In celebration of its 10th anniversary, the channel launched three new shows in October, I Plead Guilty, It Had to Be You and Papa a Toda Madre.

In 2022, Telenovela Channel launched 10 new programs in a year. This was started with Griselda Blanco: The Dark Widow, a co-production between Televisa and RTI Colombia; and The Two Lives of Estela Carrillo with Ariadne Diaz in the titular role. Also launched in March 2022 were the romance-themed Road to Destiny and the period drama Corazón Salvaje (with reruns a year later). In the summer of 2022, A Beloved Man and My Sweet Curse (a remake of Telemundo's Lola, already aired on GMA in the last quarter of 2013 with reduced episodes) were premiered.

September 2022 saw the launch of three novelas: Wild Lands, Love to Death, and Moon Daughters. Muchacha italiana viene a casarse made its comeback on Philippine TV after being aired on BEAM TV as a telenovela blocktimer from 2015–2016 in Tagalog audio. This time, it was aired on Telenovela Channel with its English audio.

The year 2023 marked its last year of bringing new titles, and also the first and only telenovela that is dubbed both in Tagalog and English. Mi pecado was launched on January 2, 2023 with Maite Perroni and Eugenio Siller as its protagonists. On May 1, 2023, Love Spell made its comeback on Telenovela Channel, using its original Spanish title Sortilegio and with English audio. The said telenovela was aired in 2012–2013 (with reruns) on TNC and 2015–2016 on BEAM TV block.

Teresa, a remake of the 1989 telenovela starring Salma Hayek, premiered on June 5, 2023, once again with Angelique Boyer in the lead. This was followed by Mar de Amor on June 12, 2023, marking the first and only appearance of international star Mario Cimarro on Telenovela Channel, and also the last new telenovela to be aired.

=== Final programming and channel closure (2024) ===
Reruns of Crown of Tears, which was aired in 2016, were shown from August 14, 2023 to January 16, 2024. Reruns of Road to Destiny (September 4, 2023), Wild Lands (January 8, 2024), and Love to Death (January 22, 2024) are the last telenovelas in the final programming line-up. As of February 1, 2024, the channel had aired 65 Mexican telenovelas (including co-productions), one Brazilian telenovela (distributed by Televisa), and one anthology.

It was announced on February 1, 2024 that the channel would close after 12 years on March 1, 2024. Cignal TV already had stopped carrying the network on January 2, 2024.

== See also ==
- Heart of Asia Channel
- Asianovela Channel (defunct)
