= Pilipinas HD =

Defunct Philippine free-to-air television channel

- Country: Philippines
- Broadcast area: Philippines
- Affiliates: BEAM TV; D8TV (timesharing)

Programming
- Picture format: 16:9 (720p/1080i HDTV)

Ownership
- Owner: Chino Trinidad

History
- Launched: June 12, 2016; 10 years ago (test broadcast); September 1, 2016; 10 years ago (official launch)
- Closed: January 20, 2025; 20 months ago
- Replaced by: D8TV

Availability

Terrestrial
- BEAM TV (Nationwide): Channel x.7 (DTT)

Pilipinas HD was a Philippine free-to-air television channel that broadcasts cultural programming. During its initial broadcast from June 12 (Philippine Independence Day) until August 31, 2016, Chino Trinidad rented a satellite space to all subscription providers to be able to watch by the viewing public free of charge.

== History ==
On September 1, 2016, Pilipinas HD was launched on digital terrestrial television, following a blocktime deal signed with Broadcast Enterprises and Affiliated Media, Inc. However, unlike its pay TV counterpart, BEAM TV handles and supplies the channel's programming on a dedicated subchannel.

On November 4, 2024, the channel began timesharing with D8TV as part of its soft launch on digital television.

On January 20, 2025, the channel ceased broadcasting after 8 years and 6 months due to programming redundancies, following Trinidad's sudden passing in July 2024, and six months after its initial launch. D8TV then took over full-time on the same BEAM TV subchannel space.

== Final programming ==
These were the list of programs aired before the channel's closure:

- Decoding Duterte - a documentary series on the biography of Former President Rodrigo Duterte
- Duyan ka Magiting (Cradle of Noble Heroes) - a series featuring the forgotten national heroes
- Pamana - a series on the Filipino families
- Filipiknow - a series on Philippine history, facts and trivias
- Grid - a travel and magazine show which will feature travel destinations in the country
- Panatang Pilipino - a series that tells the aspirations and dreams of ordinary Filipinos
- Ugat ng Lahi - a series on the rich tradition of the Filipino indigenous tribes
- Storya ng Bayan - a series that visit places and towns that have colorful history and its heroes
- Sa Ngalan ng Katotohanan - a documentary series on the biography of President Emilio Aguinaldo during the revolution on his 150th birth anniversary.
