= Pop Life TV =

Philippine TV channel

- Country: Philippines
- Broadcast area: Defunct
- Headquarters: Phil. Stock Exchange Centre, Exchange Road, Ortigas Center, Pasig, Philippines

Programming
- Languages: English; Filipino
- Picture format: 1080i/1080p HDTV (downscaled to 480i for the SDTV feed)

Ownership
- Owner: Asian Cable Communications

History
- Launched: April 8, 2019
- Closed: March 21, 2020; 6 years ago

Links
- Website: www.poplife.com.ph

Pop Life was a Philippine lifestyle and entertainment television channel owned by Asian Cable Communications.

On March 21, 2020, Pop Life TV ceased broadcasting due to the community quarantine amid the COVID-19 pandemic, stating it was temporarily. In 2022, Pop Life's Facebook page re-uploaded their profile and cover photo, although there is no confirmation if this is a sign that they are going back on air.

== Final programming ==
Pop Life's programming line-up comprises travel, lifestyle, infotainment, docuseries, animated, as well as locally produced programs and religious programs.

=== List of programs broadcast by Pop Life TV ===
Note: Titles are arranged based on categories

==== Travel ====
- Cities of the World
- Festivals of the World
- #MissAdventures
- The $100 Nomad
- This Weekend

==== Animated ====
- The Flying House
- Veggietales
- Dino Rampage
- Superbook

==== Local ====
- Mga Munting Ilaw
- How To Be You Po?
- Libangan ni Juan
- Max Lucado Travelling Light

==== Docuseries ====
- The Traffickers
- Movie Stars
- Pop Profiles
- Rock Legends

==== Infotainment ====
- Motorvision TV
- The Q You
- 4X4

==== Religious ====
- Lighthouse Cafe
- Pope: The Most Powerful Man in History
- GCTV Block
- The Pulpit

==== Lifestyle ====
- A is for Apple
- The Art of Everything
- Flour Power Flour Power
- One World Kitchen
- The Taste
- Vanishing Foods
- The Traffickers
- The Great Christmas Light Fight

==== Music ====
- Pop Tunes

==== Infomercials ====
- TV Shop Philippines
