= Jack City =

Defunct television channel in the Philippines

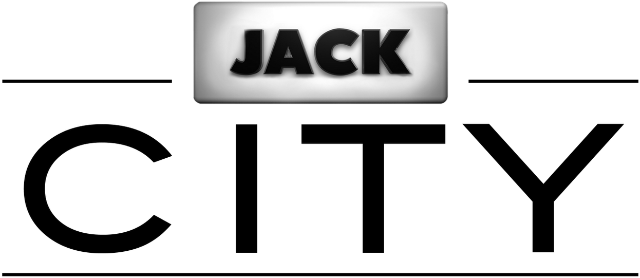
- Country: Philippines
- Broadcast area: Defunct
- Network: BEAM TV (2012–2014)

Programming
- Language: English

Ownership
- Owner: Solar Entertainment Corporation (STVNI/Nine Media)
- Sister channels: Solar News Channel/9TV (SBN 21/RPN 9); BTV; Jack TV; My Movie Channel; NBA Premium TV; Solar Sports; ETC

History
- Launched: October 20, 2012 (test broadcast); November 11, 2012 (launch)
- Closed: March 21, 2015
- Replaced by: CT (March 22, 2015)
- Former names: CHASE (December 24, 2011 – October 19, 2012)

Links
- Website: JackCITY on Solar Entertainment site

Jack City (visually rendered in its logo in all capital letters) was a Filipino cable and satellite television network based in Shaw Boulevard, Mandaluyong. Formerly known as Chase, it served as the spin-off channel to Jack TV. Owned by Solar Entertainment Corporation, the channel broadcast on Cignal Digital TV channel 22, Destiny Cable channel 64 (analog) & channel 138 (digital), Cablelink channel 40, and SkyCable channel 138 (digital) and other cable operators in the Philippines, and was also available on live streaming via video-on-demand service Blink. It was also previously aired on BEAM TV from 2012 to 2014.

== History ==
=== 2011–2012: Chase ===
During its initial launch on BEAM TV, Chase was a male-focused general entertainment channel that aired during nighttime, while sharing its channel space with the now-defunct game show channel, TGC, which aired during daytime. In late February 2012, the former announced in an on-screen graphic during its shows that it was switching to a 24-hour broadcast, therefore remaining on channel 31 while the latter was spun off into its own channel on select cable providers.

=== 2012–2015: Jack City ===
On September 7, 2012, Chase announced through on-screen graphics and various plugs that it was going to be replaced by a spin-off of its sister channel Jack TV. The changes took effect on October 20, 2012, when Jack City was launched, with some of Chase's programs carried onto its roster. The full broadcast was initiated on November 11, 2012.

On June 28, 2013, the channel's airing hours were reduced to 18 hours a day on free TV, in compliance with the National Telecommunications Commission's guidelines. However, it still continues to air 24 hours a day as a cable channel. On September 1, 2014, Jack City ended its run on free TV, due to the preparations being made by BEAM 31 for the incoming transition to ISDB-T digital television, though it continues to be broadcast as a separate cable channel. This move resulted in a change of its channel assignment for SkyCable and Destiny Cable (Digital) subscribers.

=== 2015: CT ===
In March 2015, the channel was set to be renamed as CT, signaling a deviation from the "Jack" branding. The new channel will not only air drama series like its predecessor, but will also air comedy series, talk shows and men's lifestyle programs.

=== Dispute with Sky Cable and Digital test broadcast ===
On April 10, 2017, Sky Cable & Destiny Cable dropped CT along with Basketball TV, Jack TV, Solar Sports & NBA Premium TV allegedly due to Sky Cable's unpaid carriage fees.

On December 31, 2017 at 11:59 pm, CT closed after just 2 years of broadcasting. The channel was shut down due to low ratings.

== Programming ==
Catering to a more mature male and female audience, while targeting executives, Jack City's programming consisted of action and crime-oriented drama series and movies.

== See also ==
- C/S
- CHASE
- BEAM TV
- Jack TV
- Solar Entertainment Corporation
- DWKC-DTV
