= Chase (TV channel) =

Defunct television channel in the Philippines

- Country: Philippines
- Availability: Defunct
- Headquarters: Mandaluyong, Philippines
- Owner: Broadcast Enterprises and Affiliated Media, Inc.; Solar Entertainment Corporation (STVNI/Nine Media)
- Launch date: December 24, 2011
- Dissolved: October 19, 2012
- Picture format: 480i (SDTV)
- Sister Channels: Solar News Channel (SBN 21; now Solar Flix); ETC (RPN 9; now RPTV); 2nd Avenue (RJTV 29; now RJ DigiTV); Universal Channel; Jack TV; Basketball TV; Solar Sports; Diva Universal; The Game Channel
- Language: English
- Replaced by: Jack CITY

Chase (visually rendered in its logo all capital letters) was a Philippine television network owned and produced by Solar Entertainment Corporation through Solar TV Network, Inc. (now Nine Media Corporation) It was a sister of the networks Talk TV, ETC, 2nd Avenue, Universal Channel, Jack TV, Basketball TV, Solar Sports, The Game Channel (which formerly used its evening airtime block) and Diva Universal. It was formerly available over and also broadcast via BEAM Channel 31 (free TV). Launched on December 24, 2011, its programming was focused on suspense, science fiction, and drama series (the same as the defunct C/S). It dissolved its operations on October 19, 2012, as it had been replaced by Jack City, the secondary network channel of Jack TV, although some of its programs are still carried over by said network station channel.

== History ==
=== The Game Channel & CHASE ===
Formerly when it started its launch, Chase is broadcast every night after The Game Channel, which limited its broadcast on mornings and afternoons.

=== CHASE goes 24 and Jack CITY ===
On the later part of February 2012, all programs of CHASE were marked by an investigator note, located at the lower-left side of the TV screens, where it was written that CHASE goes 24. After that event, The Game Channel then bid goodbye to viewers of BEAM Channel 31 after 7 months of broadcasting on free TV, and decided to move its operations on cable. CHASE then remained on BEAMtv 31 and took its 24-hour broadcast on free TV. Some programs of CHASE are partly seen from its sister TV network on cable, Jack TV.

On September 7, 2012, Jack TV plugged their announcement through CHASE programs bearing the title "Another Jack TV is rising, coming soon on this channel" (BEAM TV). This indicated that CHASE was being replaced; finally, on October 20, 2012, Jack City was then launched, marking October 19 as the end of CHASE's broadcasts. Jack City still does carry some of CHASE's programs however.

== See also ==
- C/S (the first Crime Channel)
- BEAM TV
- The Game Channel
- Jack City
- Solar Entertainment Corporation
- Nine Media Corporation (former Solar TV Network, Inc.)
- DWKC-DTV
- Radio Mindanao Network
