= The Game Channel =

Defunct television channel in the Philippines

The Game Channel (TGC)
- Country: Philippines
- Broadcast area: Defunct
- Headquarters: Mandaluyong, Philippines

Programming
- Language: English
- Picture format: 480i (SDTV)

Ownership
- Owner: Solar Entertainment Corporation
- Sister channels: My Movie Channel; Jack City; Jack TV; Solar Sports; BTV; NBA Premium TV

History
- Launched: April 8, 2011
- Closed: February 28, 2015
- Replaced by: My Movie Channel

The Game Channel (abbreviated TGC, stylized in small letters as tgc from January 2014 – February 2015) was a Filipino cable and satellite television network owned and produced by Solar Entertainment Corporation who also created the networks My Movie Channel, NBA Premium TV, Jack TV, Solar Sports, and BTV. It was available over Destiny Cable channel 89 and Cablelink channel 225. This network is more focused on family game shows and reality game shows.

== History ==
=== Initial broadcast and BEAM Channel 31 affiliate ===
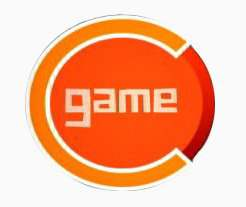
Logo of The Game Channel. (2011)

Logo of The Game Channel from August 31, 2012-January 26, 2014

The Game Channel launched on April 8, 2011 on Destiny Cable. It conducted its initial test broadcast from April 8, 2011 until September 29. Recently, it had launched its initial broadcast on BEAM Channel 31 on August 15, 2011. It had its official broadcast together with its former affiliated free TV network BEAM Channel 31 on September 30, 2011. On October 1, 2011, The Game Channel (together with its latter free-to-air broadcasting partner – BEAM TV Channel 31) was formally launched on SkyCable via channel 84 (in compliance with the NTC's rules of must-carry basis) and it was available through its digital platform.

=== The Game Channel & CHASE ===
On December 24, The Game Channel limited its broadcast on daytime sharing with a new channel CHASE (later Jack City and now CT) which takes over the evening block.

=== Chase goes 24 ===
In the middle of February 2012, while CHASE started its broadcast, there is an investigator note appeared on every show of Chase (which is located on the lower-left side on the TV screens). Noted that CHASE goes 24. After that event, on February 15, 2012, The Game Channel bid farewell to the Free-TV Viewers. Chase took all over its permanent blocktime broadcast. This network was broadcast on Destiny Cable (channel 89) on the same day.

=== Replaced by My Movie Channel ===
After almost 3 years of broadcasting, The Game Channel announced that they would no longer be broadcasting on television effective February 28, 2015 and gave thanks to its viewers before they signed off for the last time. It was replaced by My Movie Channel, which can be seen on Destiny Cable (Digital) Channel 219 (Analog) Channel 89 and Cablelink (Digital) Channel 225, starting on March 1, 2015. However, it did not last long, as Solar Entertainment announced that My Movie Channel would also cease to exist just four months later, on July 1, 2015.

== Programming ==
=== Final aired programs ===
==== Game shows ====
- Jeopardy! (season 29)
- Wheel of Fortune (season 30)
- The Got Talent (season 31)

==== Reality shows ====
- America's Got Talent (season 8)
- Fat March (season 1)
- The Bachelorette (season 9)
- The Bachelor (season 10)
- The Biggest Loser (season 10)
- The Kitchen Millionaire
- Top Chef (season 10)
- Total Blackout (season 2)
- Philippines Got Talent (aired on ABS-CBN)

==== Other ====
- America's Next Great Restaurant
- Game Changers (season 1)
- Ice Cold Cash (season 1)
- The League (season 3)
- Super Shangers (season 1)

=== Previously aired programs (with BEAM Channel 31) ===
- RPN News Watch (aired also on BEAM channel 31 and on RPN 9)¹
- RPN NewsCap (aired also on BEAM channel 31 and on RPN 9)¹
- Jai-Alai
- 2011 Presidents Cup
- Minute to Win It (Philippine version is broadcast on ABS-CBN)
- Pictureka!
- Family Game Night
- Dance Your Ass Off (Season 2)
- Top Chef: All Stars
- Top Chef Masters (Season 2)
- Survivor: Redemption Island
- Survivor: South Pacific
- Top Chef: Just Desserts (Season 1)
- The Price Is Right
- Thintervention with Jackie Warner
- Top Chef Masters (season 3)
- The Biggest Loser: Couples 3
- Rocco's Dinner Party
- Survivor: One World
- Top Town
- Splash
- Going Straight

¹Updated as of September 6, 2013

== See also ==
- GSN (American television channel devoted to game shows & reality shows)
- Challenge (a United Kingdom channel devoted to airing British game shows from various archives along with some international games)
- Solar TV (now defunct)
- Chase (now defunct)
- GameTV (a Canadian channel which airs classic Canadian game shows, and other casino gaming programs)
- Solar Entertainment Corporation
- BEAM Channel 31 (A television network which formerly broadcast on The Game Channel)
