= Jack TV =

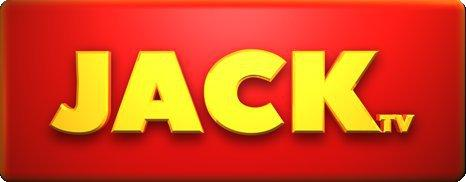
- Country: Philippines
- Headquarters: Shaw Boulevard, Mandaluyong, Metro Manila, Philippines

Programming
- Language: English
- Picture format: 480i SDTV

Ownership
- Owner: Solar Entertainment Corporation
- Sister channels: ETC; Shop TV; Solar Sports

History
- Launched: April 6, 2005; 21 years ago (test broadcast); July 12, 2005; 21 years ago (launch)
- Closed: April 1, 2020; 6 years ago
- Replaced by: Front Row Channel; Telenovela Channel (Cignal channel space)

Links
- Website: jacktv.ph

Jack TV
- Available in: English, Filipino
- Headquarters: {{{location_country}}}
- Owner: Solar Entertainment Corporation
- Key people: Cesar Emaas, Jr.
- Launched: April 1, 2020; 6 years ago

Jack TV (capitalized as JACK TV) is an online web portal owned by Solar Entertainment Corporation and based in Mandaluyong, Metro Manila. It was known as a Philippine pay television network mainly offering multi-genre programming from the United States from 2005 until 2020.

== History ==
The network was formed as part a split of the former Solar USA into two differing networks. Scripted and reality programming moved to Jack TV, with the rest of the network's programming moving to C/S (now Solar TV). Jack TV eventually took back some of C/S's programming as it adjusted its schedule. On October 20, 2012, Solar Entertainment launched its secondary channel Jack CITY on BEAM TV, replacing CHASE. The channel was later re-branded as CT, which later left the air in 2017.

On April 10, 2017, Jack TV was dropped by Sky Cable & Destiny Cable, along with Basketball TV (now defunct), CT (now defunct), Solar Sports & NBA Premium TV (now defunct) allegedly due to Sky Cable's unpaid carriage fees. It was restored to those systems on April 1, 2019.

Since 2014, Jack TV held its own annual event "MADfest" (Music, Arts and Dance Festival), featuring a mix of OPM and international artists and bands as well as live art installations and merchandise selling.

== Closure on pay TV and the transition to digital media ==
Solar Entertainment announced in late March 2020 that Jack TV would be discontinued due to lack of advertising and redundant programming. It closed on April 1. Much of its former programming moved to ETC and Solar Sports. The Jack TV website then was maintained as a limited web portal with automated entertainment news to maintain existing trademarks. On most providers, its channel space was replaced by Front Row Channel, an international digital channel of American global entertainment company Jungo TV which airs live music concerts of international music artists.
