= Broadcast Enterprises and Affiliated Media =

Philippine media company

- Type: Private (subsidiary)
- Industry: Digital terrestrial television broadcasting
- Founded: October 31, 1993; 33 years ago (broadcast); July 3, 2011; 15 years ago (company)
- Headquarters: 3/F Globe Telecom Plaza I, Pioneer corner Madison Streets, Mandaluyong, Philippines
- Key people: Joaquin L. Teng Jr. (Chairman); Steve Macion (President)
- Owner: Bethlehem Holdings, Inc. (Globe Telecom Group Retirement Fund)

BEAM TV
- Type: Terrestrial television network
- Country: Philippines
- Availability: Nationwide
- Founded: July 3, 2011; 15 years ago
- Area: Philippines
- Launch date: July 3, 2011; 15 years ago
- Official website: www.beam.com.ph

Broadcast Enterprises and Affiliated Media, Inc. (BEAM) is a telecommunications company in the Philippines with primary focus on UHF broadcasting and digital terrestrial television for the convergence of multimedia. It is owned by Bethlehem Holdings, Inc., a media investment company of Globe Telecom through its Retirement Fund group.

The frequencies currently used by BEAM (channel 31 in Metro Manila, as well as twelve regional UHF outlets) had been previously used by Radio Mindanao Network (under the affiliates CTV-31 (Cinema Television) and E! Philippines) from October 31, 1993, to June 1, 2003, prior to the acquisition by BHI/Globe in 2009.

== History ==
BEAM was established in 1993 by the Canoy family, owners of Radio Mindanao Network. Its Congressional broadcast franchise was granted in 1995. At that time, it only owned one FM radio station in Dagupan.

In 2009, Bethlehem Holdings Inc., an investment firm of the Globe Telecom Retirement Group Fund, acquired BEAM from the Canoys (coinciding with the acquisition of a large stake in another broadcast firm, Altimax, from Mel Velarde).

Throughout 2014, BEAM began transitioning its analog channels in key cities nationwide to digital broadcast via ISDB-T. Aside from blocktimers, BEAM is now looking for local and foreign partnerships to allocate and generate content up to seven digital free TV channels.

On July 30, 2020, Philippine President Rodrigo Duterte signed Republic Act No. 11482 into law which renewed BEAM's legislative franchise for another 25 years. The law granted BEAM a franchise to construct, install, operate, and maintain, for commercial purposes, radio broadcasting stations and television stations, including digital television system, with the corresponding facilities such as relay stations, throughout the Philippines.

== Stations ==
=== TV Stations ===
==== Digital ====
BEAM TV's upcoming expansion of digital terrestrial television will be announced as soon as possible for other key regional areas nationwide:

• Dagupan (DTV-31) (Note: Licensed to Sphere Entertainment, Inc.)

Branding	Callsign	Channel	Frequency	Power	Type	Location
BEAM TV Manila	DWKC	31	575.143 MHz	5 kW	Originating	Palos Verdes Subdivision, Sumulong Highway, Antipolo City, Rizal
BEAM TV Baguio	DWHB	26	545.143 MHz	5 kW	Relay	Mt. Sto. Tomas, Tuba, Benguet
BEAM TV Batangas	DWAG	36	605.143 MHz	1 kW	Affiliate	Mt. Banoy, Batangas City
BEAM TV Legazpi	PA	33	587.143 MHz	2.4 kW	Relay	Barangay 56-Taysan, Legazpi, Albay
BEAM TV Naga	DWHC	32	581.143 MHz	5 kW	Relay	Brgy. Triangulo, Naga City
BEAM TV Iloilo	DYRM	26	545.143 MHz	5 kW	Relay	Alaguisoc, Jordan, Guimaras
BEAM TV Cebu	DYCT	31	575.143 MHz	5 kW	Relay	Nivel Hills, Lahug, Cebu City
BEAM TV Tacloban	PA	28	557.143 MHz	1 kW	Affiliate	Tacloban
BEAM TV Zamboanga	DXBE	31	575.143 MHz	5 kW	Relay	Mt. Cabatangan, Zamboanga City
BEAM TV Cagayan de Oro	DXBA	43	647.143 MHz	2.4 kW	Relay	Macapagal Drive, Brgy. Bulua, Cagayan de Oro
BEAM TV Davao	DXKC	31	575.143 MHz	5 kW	Relay	Matina Shrine, Davao City
BEAM TV General Santos	DXAH	51	695.143 MHz	1 kW	Affiliate	General Santos

==== Digital Subchannels ====
BEAM TV's nationwide digital broadcast is multiplexed into the following subchannels:

LCN	Video	Aspect	Name	Programming	Notes
xx.1	480i	4:3	PRTV PRIME	PRTV Prime Media	Commercial Broadcast
xx.2	480i	4:3	KNOWLEDGE CHANNEL	Knowledge Channel	Commercial Broadcast
xx.3	480i	4:3	RESERVED	(SMPTE Color Bars)	Test Broadcast
xx.4	480i	4:3	BILYONARYO NEWS CHANNEL	Bilyonaryo News Channel	Commercial Broadcast
xx.5	480i	4:3	D8TV	D8TV	Commercial Broadcast

=== Radio Stations ===
Callsign	Frequency	Power	Location	Notes
DWHT	107.9 MHz	5 kW	Dagupan	(Note: Station operated by Interactive Broadcast Media Broadcasting as a relay station of DWWW.)

== See also ==
- Radio Mindanao Network
- Ayala Corporation
- Globe Telecom
- Altimax
- Kroma Entertainment
