= D8TV =

Philippine free-to-air television channel

- Logo used since 2026
- Country: Philippines
- Broadcast area: National
- Affiliates: BEAM TV; Voice of America

Programming
- Languages: Filipino (main); English (secondary)
- Picture format: 1080i/720p HDTV (downscaled to 16:9 480i for the SDTV feed)

Ownership
- Owner: Digital 8, Inc.

History
- Launched: November 4, 2024; 2 years ago (test broadcast); February 10, 2025; 21 months ago (official launch)
- Replaced: Pilipinas HD; Life TV (xx.06 digital channel space)

Links
- Website: d8tv.ph

Availability

Terrestrial
- BEAM TV (Nationwide): Channel x.5 (DTT)
- Cignal TV (Nationwide): Channel 65
- Sky TV (Metro Manila): Channel 33

D8TV (Note: an acronym for Digital 8 Television) is a Philippine free-to-air digital television network that broadcasts a variety of lifestyle and infotainment programming. It is owned by Digital 8, a media company primarily owned by Rommel Miranda, a former spokesperson of the NCRPO.

== History ==
Logo used from 2024 to 2026

D8TV began its broadcast on soft launch on November 4, 2024, thru channel timesharing with Pilipinas HD. The channel initially aired some programs from third-party productions and content creators, including Boss Toyo's Geng Geng Network and Island Living Channel. The channel also con-jointly partnered with IBC to become new television distributors of lottery draws from the Philippine Charity Sweepstakes Office, which began on December 31, 2024, effectively ending a three-decade run on PTV.

On January 20, 2025, the channel stopped its timesharing with Pilipinas HD after the latter ceased broadcast due to the sudden passing of Chino Trinidad, thus extending the channel's airing time.

In August 2025, D8TV quietly rebranded as a government-focused channel, primarily broadcasting programs from the Presidential Communications Office (Radio Television Malacañang), the Senate of the Philippines, and the House of Representatives of the Philippines, while remaining privately owned.

On February 2, 2026, D8TV reverted to an informative channel and launched its refreshed logo. However, it retained its existing government-focused programs.

== Programming ==
- Agapay: Tatak Rosa Rosal
- Alam Mo Dapat!
- Ang Gwenda Natin
- Ang Maging Pilipino
- Boarding Haus
- Congress TV
- D8 Patrol - a primetime newscast
- D8TV All Access
- D8TV News Alert - an hourly news bulletin
- Hawak Mo Ang Beat: Legis Recap
- Jazz Girls
- Kwento Juan
- Kawangga Warriors
- Metro Escape
- Negoskarte
- PCSO Lottery Draw
- Pinoy Pawnstars
- Popoy Lupoy
- Radyo Drama sa TV
- Roomies
- RTVMalacañang
- Senate Hearing
- Tara, Food Trip
- The AI Talks with the Voice Master
- The Game Changer
- The PH Insider
- Unfiltered
- Voice of America
- Walang Bola, Puro Tama

=== Upcoming programs ===
- Ansabe ng Bayan?
- Chikaverse
- D8 Sports E-League
- D8TV Kapihan
- Game Room
- Slam Dance
- The Band Reality

=== Former programs ===
- Bigayan Na with Boss Toyo!! (2024–2025)
- D8TV News: Balitang Balita (2025)
- Iskovery Night (2025)
- Island Living Channel (2024–2025)
- Motivated 3x3 Basketball Tournament (2024–2025)
- Motivated Billiard League (2024–2025)
- PBBM Podcast (2025–2026)
- Pigeon Insider (2024–2025)

== Availability ==
D8TV is seen via BEAM TV's digital terrestrial UHF channel 31 in Mega Manila, Cebu, Zamboanga and Davao, UHF channel 26 in Baguio and Iloilo, UHF channel 36 in Batangas, UHF channel 32 in Naga, UHF channel 33 in Legazpi, UHF channel 28 in Tacloban, UHF channel 43 in Cagayan de Oro and UHF channel 51 in General Santos, and since May 4, 2026 also watch on Sky TV Channel 33 in Metro Manila and Cignal TV Channel 65 Nationwide.
