= Telephone numbers in the Philippines =

Telephone numbers in Philippines
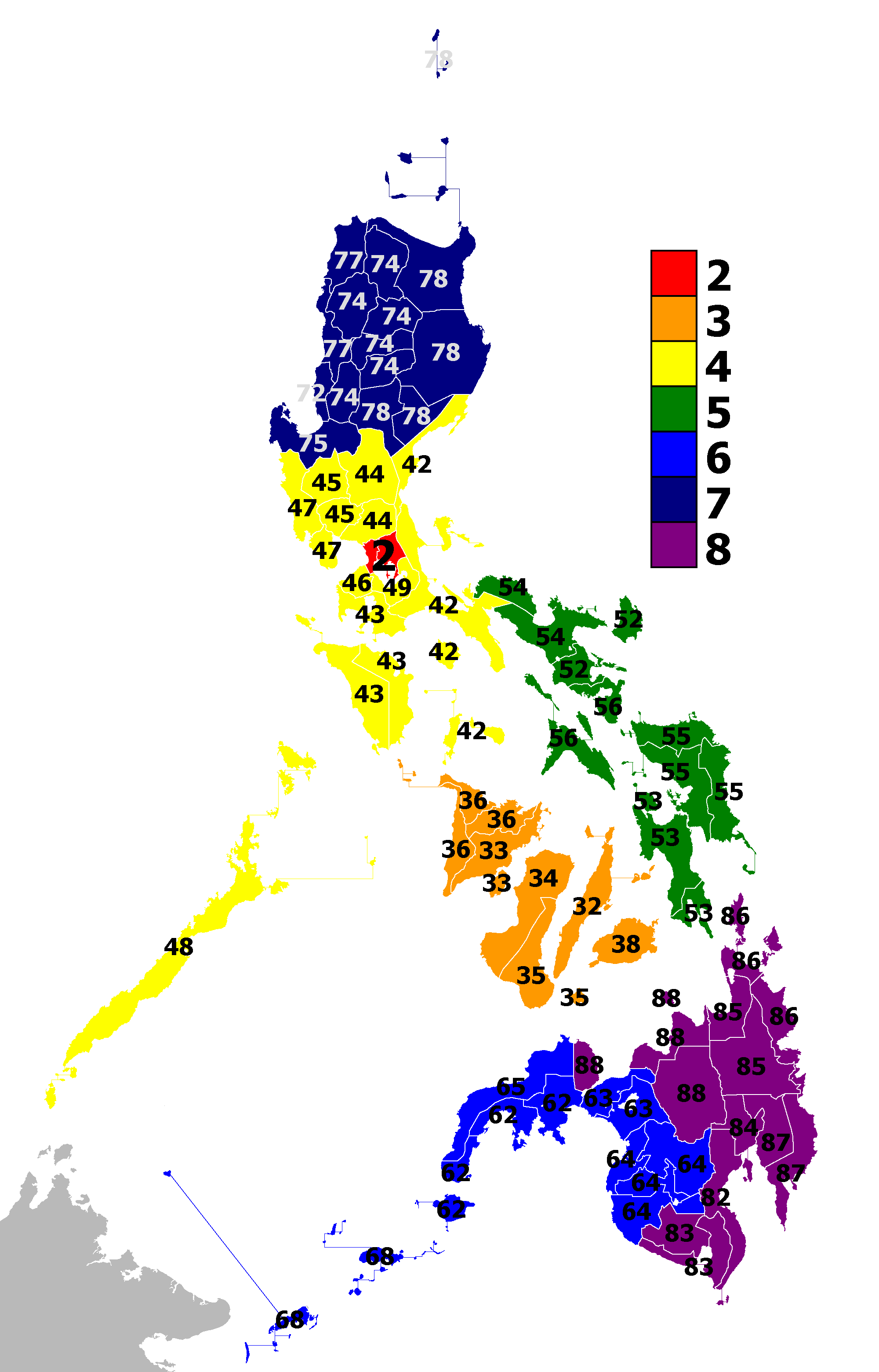
- Fixed-line area codes
- Country: Philippines
- Continent: Asia
- Numbering plan type: Open
- NSN length: 9 digits (landline); 11 digits (mobile)
- Format: 0XX-XXX-YYYY; 02-XXXX-YYYY (for area code "02" only); 09XX-XXX-YYYY (mobile phones)
- Country code: +63
- International access: 00
- Long-distance: 0

Telephone numbers in the Philippines follow an open telephone numbering plan and an open dial plan. Both plans are regulated by the National Telecommunications Commission, an attached agency under the Department of Information and Communications Technology (DICT).

The Philippines is assigned an international dialing code of +63 by ITU-T. Telephone numbers are fixed at eight digits for area code 02, and seven digits for area codes from 03X to 09X, with area codes fixed at one, two, or three digits (a six-digit system was used until the mid-1990s; four to five digits were used in the countryside). Mobile phone numbers are always 10 digits (three digits for the service provider, plus a seven-digit number).

When making long-distance calls in the Philippines, the prefixes 0 for domestic calls and 00 for international calls are used.

== Fixed-line area codes ==
Philippine area codes for fixed-line or landline telephones are fixed at two digits, excluding Metro Manila, the province of Rizal and the cities of Bacoor in Cavite and San Pedro in Laguna, which use the area code 2. Some smaller carriers concentrated within a specific geographic area may issue four- or five-digit area codes, but these are being phased out in favor of the standard two-digit area codes.

Occasionally, some areas may change area codes. For examples before 6 October 2019: Obando formerly used area code 2. Bacoor formerly used the Cavite province area code. San Pedro formerly used the Laguna province area code.

Sometimes area codes are shared by several local government entities to maximize their use. Some area codes are shared by multiple provinces, as is the case for former sub-provinces like Guimaras and Iloilo; divided provinces like Zamboanga Sibugay and Zamboanga del Sur; or provinces with small populations like Marinduque and Quezon. In extreme cases, area codes are shared across an island like in Leyte and Samar, or even entire regions, such as with the Cordillera Administrative Region. To identify the call's point of origin, the three-digit telephone exchange prefix is checked.

Since the Philippines employs an open dial plan, telephone numbers dialed within a given area code do not require the area code, excluding calls made from mobile phones or payphones. When dialing other area codes, the domestic long-distance access prefix 0 is added, but when dialing from overseas, the domestic prefix is not included. As such, a typical telephone number in Metro Manila and Rizal would look like this:

- Within Metro Manila, Rizal, and cities of Bacoor and San Pedro: 8123–4567
- Outside Metro Manila, Rizal, and cities of Bacoor and San Pedro: 02–8123–4567
- Overseas calls: +63-2-8123-4567

Since October 6, 2019, all telephone numbers with the area code 2 were migrated to eight digits, as mandated by the National Telecommunications Commission's Memorandum Order No. 10–10–2017, due to insufficient assignable local exchange codes. The maintenance for this migration from 7-digit (XXX-YYYY) to 8-digit numbers (PXXX-YYYY) occurred from 12:00 a.m. to 5:00 a.m. PHT, causing a five-hour disconnection. This affected subscription-based virtual numbers (i.e. Globe Duo), SIM card-based Telephone Service (i.e. PLDT Landline Plus Prepaid), #MyNumber (the format is #XXXXX, i.e. #87000 for Jollibee Delivery), FEX Lines, SIP Trunks, ISDN and vanity numbers, including virtual numbers like short-digit numbers (e.g., *1888 for PLDT Telephone Support, 211 for Globe Prepaid Help and Support), Toll Free (domestic, international and universal, i.e. 1-800-1-123-4567, in dialing, 00-800-1-123-4567) and Premium numbers such as embassy hotline and 1900 service hotline.

Since October 6, 2019, 5:00 a.m. PHT, the following telephone number format to be followed:

- PXXX-YYYY where P is for Public Telecommunication Entity, and the XXX-YYYY is the telephone number.

NTC has assigned the following Public Telecommunications Entity (PTE) identifiers:

- 3XXX–YYYY: Bayan Telecommunications
- 5XXX–YYYY: Eastern Communications Philippines
- 6XXX–YYYY: ABS-CBN Convergence
- 7XXX–YYYY: Globe Telecom
- 8XXX–YYYY: PLDT

Areas are grouped into seven broad areas determining the first digit of a given area code. These areas and their accompanying area codes are listed below:

=== Area 2 – National Capital Region, Rizal and Surroundings ===
- 2: Metro Manila, Rizal, Cavite (Bacoor), Laguna (San Pedro)

=== Area 3 – Western and Central Visayas ===
- 32: Cebu
- 33: Guimaras, Iloilo
- 34: Negros Occidental
- 35: Negros Oriental, Siquijor
- 36: Aklan, Antique, Capiz
- 37:
- 38: Bohol
- 39:

=== Area 4 – Central Luzon and Southern Tagalog ===
- 42: Aurora, Marinduque, Quezon, Romblon
- 43: Batangas, Occidental Mindoro, Oriental Mindoro
- 44: Bulacan, Nueva Ecija
- 45: Pampanga, Tarlac
- 46: Cavite (except Bacoor)
- 47: Bataan, Zambales
- 48: Palawan
- 49: Laguna (except San Pedro)

=== Area 5 – Bicol and Eastern Visayas ===
- 52: Albay, Catanduanes
- 53: Biliran, Leyte, Southern Leyte
- 54: Camarines Norte, Camarines Sur
- 55: Eastern Samar, Northern Samar, Western Samar
- 56: Masbate, Sorsogon
- 57:
- 58:
- 59:

=== Area 6 – Western and Central Mindanao (Zamboanga Peninsula, Bangsamoro and Northern Soccsksargen) ===
- 62: Basilan, Zamboanga del Sur, Zamboanga Sibugay
- 63: Lanao del Norte, Lanao del Sur
- 64: Cotabato, Maguindanao del Norte, Maguindanao del Sur, Sultan Kudarat
- 65: Zamboanga del Norte
- 66:
- 67:
- 68: Sulu, Tawi-Tawi
- 69:

=== Area 7 – Northern Luzon (Ilocos Region, Cagayan Valley and Cordillera Administrative Region) ===
- 72: La Union
- 73:
- 74: Abra, Apayao, Benguet, Ifugao, Kalinga, Mountain Province
- 75: Pangasinan
- 76:
- 77: Ilocos Norte, Ilocos Sur
- 78: Batanes, Cagayan, Isabela, Nueva Vizcaya, Quirino
- 79:

=== Area 8 – Northern, Eastern and Southern Mindanao (Davao Region, Caraga and Southern Soccsksargen) ===
- 82: Davao del Sur, Davao Occidental
- 83: Sarangani, South Cotabato
- 84: Davao del Norte
- 85: Agusan del Norte, Agusan del Sur
- 86: Dinagat Islands, Surigao del Norte, Surigao del Sur
- 87: Davao de Oro, Davao Oriental
- 88: Bukidnon, Camiguin, Misamis Occidental, Misamis Oriental

=== List of fixed-line area codes ===
Destination	Province	Area Code
Abangan	Bulacan	44
Abucay	Bataan	47
Agoo	La Union	72
Alaminos	Pangasinan	75
Alcala	Pangasinan	75
Alicia	Isabela	78
Alimodian	Iloilo	33
Alitagtag	Batangas	43
Angat	Bulacan	44
Angeles City	Pampanga	45
Antique	Antique	36
Apalit	Pampanga	45
Aparri	Cagayan Valley	78
Argao	Cebu	32
Asingan	Pangasinan	75
Atimonan	Quezon	42
Aurora	Isabela	78
Metro Bacolod (Silay; Talisay)	Negros Occidental	34
Bacolor	Pampanga	45
Bacoor	Cavite	2
Bagabag	Nueva Vizcaya	78
Bago	Negros Occidental	34
Bagon-Taas	Bukidnon	88
Baguio	Benguet	74
Bais	Negros Oriental	35
Balagtas	Bulacan	44
Balamban	Cebu	32
Balanga	Bataan	47
Balayan	Batangas	43
Baliuag	Bulacan	44
Ballesteros	Cagayan Valley	78
Balungao	Pangasinan	75
Bamban	Tarlac	45
Bambang	Nueva Vizcaya	78
Banate	Iloilo	33
Banaue	Ifugao	74
Bangued	Abra	74
Bani	Pangasinan	75
Bantay	Ilocos Sur	77
Basco	Batanes	78
Basista	Pangasinan	75
Batac	Ilocos Norte	77
Batangas City	Batangas	43
Bauan	Batangas	43
Bauang	La Union	72
Bautista	Pangasinan	75
Bayambang	Pangasinan	75
Bayawan	Negros Oriental	35
Bayombong	Nueva Vizcaya	78
Bayugan	Agusan del Sur	85
Binakayan	Cavite	46
Binalbagan	Negros Occidental	34
Binalonan	Pangasinan	75
Biñan	Laguna	49
Binmaley	Pangasinan	75
Bislig	Surigao del Sur	86
Boac	Marinduque	42
Bocaue	Bulacan	44
Bogo	Cebu	32
Bolinao	Pangasinan	75
Bontoc	Mountain Province	74
Boracay	Aklan	36
Bugallon	Pangasinan	75
Buguey	Cagayan Valley	78
Buhi	Camarines Sur	54
Bula	Camarines Sur	54
Bulacan	Bulacan	44
Bulan	Sorsogon	56
Bustos	Bulacan	44
Butuan	Agusan del Norte	85
Metro Cebu (Carcar; Danao; Lapu-Lapu; Mandaue; Naga; Talisay)	Cebu	32
Cabadbaran	Agusan del Norte	85
Cabagan	Isabela	78
Cabanatuan	Nueva Ecija	44
Cabarroguis	Quirino	78
Cabatuan	Isabela	78
Cabatuan	Iloilo	33
Cabugao	Ilocos Sur	77
Cabuyao	Laguna	49
Cadiz	Negros Occidental	34
Cagayan de Oro	Misamis Oriental	88
Calabanga	Camarines Sur	54
Calamba	Laguna	49
Calamba	Misamis Occidental	88
Calapan	Mindoro Oriental	43
Calasiao	Pangasinan	75
Calauag	Quezon	42
Calbayog	Western Samar	55
Calumpit	Bulacan	44
Camalaniugan	Cagayan Valley	78
Camalig	Albay	52
Camiguin	Camiguin	88
Camiling	Tarlac	45
Candelaria	Quezon	42
Candon	Ilocos Sur	77
Canlubang	Laguna	49
Canlubang Sugar Estate	Laguna	49
Caoayan	Ilocos Sur	77
Capas	Tarlac	45
Carmona	Cavite	46
Cauayan	Isabela	78
Cavite	Cavite	46
Cavite Export Processing Zone Authority	Cavite	46
Clark Special Economic Zone	Pampanga	45
Claveria	Cagayan Valley	78
Concepcion	Tarlac	45
Cotabato City	Maguindanao	64
Cuenca	Batangas	43
Currimao	Ilocos Norte	77
Cuyapo	Nueva Ecija	44
Daet	Camarines Norte	54
Dagupan	Pangasinan	75
Damilag	Bukidnon	88
Dipolog	Zamboanga del Norte	65
Daraga	Albay	52
Dasmariñas	Cavite	46
Dasol	Pangasinan	75
Davao	Davao del Sur	82
Digos	Davao del Sur	82
Dinaig	Maguindanao	64
Dinalupihan	Bataan	47
Dingras	Ilocos Norte	77
Dipolog	Zamboanga del Sur	65
Don Carlos	Bukidnon	88
Dumaguete	Negros Oriental	35
Dumangas	Iloilo	33
Echague	Isabela	78
Enrile	Cagayan Valley	78
Escalante	Negros Occidental	34
Espiritu	Ilocos Norte	77
Estancia	Iloilo	33
First Cavite Industrial Estate	Cavite	46
Floridablanca	Pampanga	45
Galmuyod	Ilocos Sur	77
Gapan	Nueva Ecija	44
General Santos	South Cotabato	83
Gingoog	Misamis Oriental	88
Gonzaga	Cagayan Valley	78
Guagua	Pampanga	45
Gubat	Sorsogon	56
Guiguinto	Bulacan	44
Guimba	Nueva Ecija	44
Gumaca	Quezon	42
Hagonoy	Bulacan	44
Hermosa	Bataan	47
Hinigaran	Negros Occidental	34
Iba	Zambales	47
Ibaan	Batangas	43
Ilagan	Isabela	78
Iligan	Lanao del Norte	63
Iloilo	Iloilo	33
Imus	Cavite	46
Indang	Cavite	46
Infanta	Quezon	42
Ipil	Zamboanga del Sur	62
Iriga	Camarines Sur	54
Irosin	Sorsogon	56
Isabela	Negros Occidental	34
Isulan	Sultan Kudarat	64
Jagna	Bohol	38
Javalera	Cavite	46
Jimenez	Misamis Occidental	88
Jose Panganiban	Camarines Norte	54
Kabankalan	Negros Occidental	34
Kalibo	Aklan	36
Kapatagan	Lanao del Norte	63
Kawit	Cavite	46
Kidapawan	Cotabato	64
Koronadal	South Cotabato	83
La Carlota	Negros Occidental	34
La Castellana	Negros Occidental	34
La Paz	Iloilo	33
La Trinidad	Benguet	74
Labo	Camarines Norte	54
Labrador	Pangasinan	75
Laguna International Industrial Park	Laguna	49
Laguna Technopark	Laguna	49
Lal-lo	Cagayan Valley	78
Laoag	Ilocos Norte	77
Legaspi	Albay	52
Lemery	Batangas	43
Libmanan	Camarines Sur	54
Libon	Albay	52
Ligao	Albay	52
Light Industry & Science Park of the Philippines	Laguna	49
Liliw	Laguna	49
Limay	Bataan	47
Lingayen	Pangasinan	75
Lipa	Batangas	43
Lopez	Quezon	42
Los Baños	Laguna	49
Lubao	Pampanga	45
Lucban	Quezon	42
Lucena	Quezon	42
Luisiana	Laguna	49
Luisita Industrial Park	Tarlac	45
Lumban	Laguna	49
Lutopan	Cebu	32
Mabalacat	Pampanga	45
Mabini	Pangasinan	75
Macabebe	Pampanga	45
Mactan	Cebu	32
Magarao	Camarines Sur	54
Magsingal	Ilocos Sur	77
Majayjay	Laguna	49
Malasiqui	Pangasinan	75
Malaybalay	Bukidnon	88
Mallig	Isabela	78
Malolos	Bulacan	44
Mambajao	Camiguin	88
Mamburao	Mindoro Occidental	43
Mambusao	Capiz	36
Manaoag	Pangasinan	75
Manapla	Negros Occidental	34
Mangagoy	Surigao del Sur	86
Mangaldan	Pangasinan	75
Mangatarem	Pangasinan	75
Mankayan	Benguet	74
Marawi	Lanao del Sur	63
Marcos	Ilocos Norte	77
Marilao	Bulacan	44
Mariveles (Bataan Export Processing Zone Authority)	Bataan	47
Masatol	Pampanga	45
Masbate	Masbate	56
Masinloc	Zambales	47
Mati	Davao Oriental	87
Matina	Davao del Sur	82
Mauban	Quezon	42
Mexico	Pampanga	45
Meycauayan	Bulacan	44
Miagao	Iloilo	33
Midsayap	Cotabato	64
Molave	Zamboanga del Sur	62
Molino	Cavite	46
Muñoz	Nueva Ecija	44
Nabua	Camarines Sur	54
Naga	Camarines Sur	54
Nagcarlan	Laguna	49
Naic	Cavite	46
Narvacan	Ilocos Sur	77
Nasipit	Agusan del Norte	85
Nasugbu	Batangas	43
Naujan	Mindoro Oriental	43
Norzagaray	Bulacan	44
Noveleta	Cavite	46
Oas	Albay	52
Obando	Bulacan	44
Olongapo	Zambales	47
Orani	Bataan	47
Orion	Bataan	47
Ormoc	Leyte	53
Oroquieta	Misamis Occidental	88
Ozamiz	Misamis Occidental	88
Padre Garcia	Batangas	43
Pagadian	Zamboanga del Sur	62
Pagbilao	Quezon	42
Pagsanjan	Laguna	49
Palo	Leyte	53
Panabo	Davao del Norte	84
Pandayan	Bulacan	44
Pandi	Bulacan	44
Paniqui	Tarlac	45
Paoay	Ilocos Norte	77
Passi	Iloilo	33
Piddig	Ilocos Norte	77
Pila	Laguna	49
Pili	Camarines Sur	54
Plaridel	Bulacan	44
Plaridel	Misamis Occidental	88
Polangui	Albay	52
Polomolok	South Cotabato	83
Pontevedra	Capiz	36
Pozorrubio	Pangasinan	75
Prosperidad	Agusan del Sur	85
Puerto Princesa	Palawan	48
Pulilan	Bulacan	44
Quezon	Nueva Vizcaya	78
Rosales	Pangasinan	75
Rosario	Batangas	43
Rosario	Cavite	46
Roxas	Capiz	36
Roxas	Isabela	78
Sagbat	Batangas	43
Saint Francis	Bulacan	44
Samal	Bataan	47
Samar	Eastern Samar & Northern Samar	55
San Carlos	Negros Occidental	34
San Carlos	Pangasinan	75
San Fabian	Pangasinan	75
San Fernando	La Union	72
San Fernando	Pampanga	45
San Ildefonso	Bulacan	44
San Ildefonso	Ilocos Sur	77
San Jose	Batangas	43
San Jose	Mindoro Occidental	43
San Jose	Nueva Ecija	44
San Juan	Batangas	43
San Manuel	Isabela	78
San Manuel	Pangasinan	75
San Marcelino	Zambales	47
San Mateo	Isabela	78
San Miguel	Bulacan	44
San Miguel	Isabela	78
San Narciso	Zambales	47
San Nicolas	Ilocos Norte	77
San Nicolas	Pangasinan	75
San Pablo	Laguna	49
San Pedro	Laguna	2
San Quintin	Pangasinan	75
San Rafael	Bulacan	44
San Vicente	Ilocos Sur	77
Sanchez-Mira	Cagayan Valley	78
Santa	Ilocos Sur	77
Santa Catalina	Ilocos Sur	77
Santa Cruz	Laguna	49
Santa Cruz	Marinduque	42
Santa Cruz	Zambales	47
Santa Lucia	Ilocos Sur	77
Santa Maria	Bulacan	44
Santa Maria	Ilocos Sur	77
Santa Maria	Pangasinan	75
Santa Rosa	Laguna	49
Santa Rosa	Nueva Ecija	44
Santiago	Isabela	78
Santo Domingo	Ilocos Sur	77
Santo Tomas	Pangasinan	75
Sara	Iloilo	33
Sarangani	South Cotabato	83
Sariaya	Quezon	42
Sarrat	Ilocos Norte	77
Sasa	Davao del Sur	82
Silang	Cavite	46
Sinait	Ilocos Sur	77
Sipocot	Camarines Sur	54
Sison	Pangasinan	75
Solana	Cagayan Valley	78
Solano	Nueva Vizcaya	78
Solsona	Ilocos Norte	77
Sorsogon	Sorsogon	56
Sual	Pangasinan	75
Subic Bay Freeport Zone	Zambales	47
Sultan Kudarat	Maguindanao	64
Surallah	South Cotabato	83
Surigao	Surigao del Norte	86
Taal	Batangas	43
Tabaco	Albay	52
Tabuk	Kalinga	74
Tacloban	Leyte	53
Tacurong	Sultan Kudarat	64
Tagaytay	Cavite	46
Tagbilaran	Bohol	38
Tagoloan	Misamis Oriental	88
Tagudin	Ilocos Sur	77
Tagum	Davao del Norte	84
Talavera	Nueva Ecija	44
Talibon	Bohol	38
Talisay	Batangas	43
Tanauan	Batangas	43
Tanauan	Leyte	53
Tangub	Negros Occidental	34
Tanjay	Negros Oriental	35
Tanza	Cavite	46
Tarlac	Tarlac	45
Tawi-Tawi	Tawi-Tawi	68
Tayabas	Quezon	42
Tayug	Pangasinan	75
Tiaong	Quezon	42
Tiwi	Albay	52
Toledo	Cebu	32
Trece Martires	Cavite	46
Tubod	Lanao del Norte	63
Tuguegarao	Cagayan Valley	78
Tumauini	Isabela	78
Ubay	Bohol	38
Umingan	Pangasinan	75
Urbiztondo	Pangasinan	75
Urdaneta	Pangasinan	75
Valencia	Bukidnon	88
Victoria	Tarlac	45
Victorias	Negros Occidental	34
Vigan	Ilocos Sur	77
Villasis	Pangasinan	75
Virac	Catanduanes	52
Zamboanga City	Zamboanga del Sur	62
Zapote	Cavite	46

== Mobile phone area codes ==
Mobile area codes are three digits long and always start with the number 9, although new area codes have been issued with 8 as the starting digit, particularly for VoIP phone numbers. However, the area code indicates the service provider and not necessarily a geographic region. Unlike fixed-line telephones, the long-distance telephone dialing format is always observed when using a mobile phone. Therefore, mobile phone numbers always have the format "+63 912 345 6789" for international callers and "0912 345 6789" for domestic callers.

Some of the first area codes to be assigned for mobile phones were 912 for Mobiline/Piltel, 915 for Islacom, 917 for Globe Telecom, 918 for Smart Communications, and 973 for Express Telecom. As service began growing rapidly since the 1990s, new codes have been added to meet demand as existing codes have since been exhausted. Newer codes often come immediately after the last code is exhausted, but this might not be the case if the next code is already in use. Starting October 21, 2020, Sun's prepaid service was merged and rebranded into Smart Prepaid, leaving its postpaid service under "Sun" branding. Beginning March 2021, Dito Telecommunity launched new mobile number prefixes: 895, 896, 897, 898, 991, 992, 993 and 994, assigned to Dito Prepaid, Dito Postpaid and Dito WiFi Prepaid.

On April 11, 2022, PLDT and Smart announced the merger of Sun's postpaid service with Smart Postpaid, retiring all Sun Postpaid plans by April 25, 2022. Potential subscribers were encouraged to opt for Smart Signature plans, while existing Sun subscribers could continue with their plans or upgrade. The Sun Cellular brand was phased out in favor of the Smart brand.

In May 2023, Globe Telecom maintained its mobile number prefixes: 954 for Globe At Home Prepaid WiFi, 952 and 953 for TM, and 976 for GOMO. That same month, Smart Communications introduced the 962 prefix for Smart (Prepaid, Postpaid, and Bro Prepaid), while keeping the prefixes 981 and 985 for TNT, and 964 for Smart Bro Home WiFi Prepaid (formerly PLDT Home WiFi Prepaid) and TNT.

Sometime in August 2025, Smart Communications reintroduced the 925 prefix in time for the launch of its app-based MVNO brand KiQ. The said prefix was used by its former brand Sun Cellular for its prepaid, postpaid and Sun Wireless Broadband services. However, several blocks from this prefix are currently being utilized by Smart for its prepaid and postpaid services.

In November 2025, Dito Telecommunity introduced the 924, 934 and 944 prefixes for Dito Prepaid, Dito Postpaid and Dito WiFi Prepaid.

Area codes are grouped by the provider with no single contiguous block of codes for a single provider. The companies and their respective area codes are listed below:

† - Inactive ‡ - Defunct List updated as of November 2025.
D	Dito Telecommunity
G	Globe Telecom, Globe at Home, TM, GOMO
S	Smart Communications, PLDT Home, TNT, KiQ

First 2 digits	Third digit									
First 2 digits	0	1	2	3	4	5	6	7	8	9
81				S				G		
89						D	D	D	D	
90						G	G	S	S	S
91	S		S			G	G	G	S	S
92	S	S	S	S	D	S	G	G	S	S
93	S	S	S	S	D	G	G	G	S	S
94			S	S	D	G	S	S	S	S
95	S	S	G	G	G	G	G			
96	S	S	S	S	S	G	G	G	S	S
97	S					G	G	G		
98		S				S				
99		D	D	D	D	G	G	G	S	S

== See also ==
- SIM Registration Act
- ZIP codes in the Philippines
