= PIE (TV channel) =

Defunct free-to-air television channel in the Philippines

- Sole logo used from 2022 to 2024
- Country: Philippines
- Broadcast area: Nationwide (television and online); Worldwide (online) (Note: PIE Channel's game formats are only exclusive to users residing in the Philippines and only valid during the live shows of the programs.)
- Network: ABS-CBN; BEAM TV
- Affiliates: List of PIE Channel Stations
- Headquarters: For ABS-CBN: ABS-CBN Broadcasting Center, Sgt. Esguerra Ave. corner Mo. Ignacia Ave., Diliman, Quezon City; For Kroma Entertainment: Globe Telecom Plaza I, Pioneer St. corner Madison St., Mandaluyong; For 917Ventures: W 5th Ave., Bonifacio Global City, Taguig

Programming
- Languages: Filipino (main); English (secondary)
- Picture format: 1080i HDTV (downscaled to 16:9 480i for the SDTV feed)

Ownership
- Owner: ABS-CBN Corporation; Kroma Entertainment; 917Ventures
- Parent: Globe Telecom (for BEAM, Kroma Entertainment and 917Ventures)
- Sister channels: Under ABS-CBN; A2Z (via ZOE TV); ANC; Cine Mo! Cinema One; Jeepney TV; Kapamilya Channel; Knowledge Channel; Metro Channel; Myx; TeleRadyo Serbisyo; TFC; Favorite Music Radio

History
- Launched: May 23, 2022; 4 years ago (as a TV channel); January 1, 2024; 2 years ago (as a digital media)
- Closed: December 31, 2023; 2 years ago (as a TV channel); June 15, 2024; 2 years ago (as a digital media)
- Replaced by: PRTV Prime Media/DZMM TeleRadyo (BEAM TV channel space)

Links
- Website: pie.com.ph

Availability

Streaming media
- YouTube: Watch live
- Official website: Watch live

Pinoy Interactive Entertainment (also known on-air as PIE and stylized as PiE) was a Philippine free-to-air television channel co-owned by ABS-CBN Corporation (operates as its main content provider), Kroma Entertainment and 917Ventures, in partnership with Broadcast Enterprises and Affiliated Media. The name is derived from pie, a baked pastry dish made of dough casing that contains various sweet or savory filling ingredient.

The channel consists of different traditional and digital (known as "tradigital") entertainment programs for games, talk and variety shows mixed with real-time interaction format that can be viewed at any device, dubbed as the country's first multiscreen and real-time interactive entertainment channel. It broadcast nationwide on television via digital terrestrial through BEAM TV on its flagship station Channel 31, cable and satellite providers (until December 31, 2023), as well as worldwide via online through PIE's YouTube channel, its official website and GCash's GLife (since May 28, 2022), which operates from 11:00 am to 11:00 pm (except Holy Week yearly where it signs off from Maundy Thursday at midnight until Easter Sunday at 11:00 AM).

== Background and history ==
On April 6, 2022, Ayala Corporation-owned Globe Telecom ventured into the media and entertainment industry by launching a multi-platform innovative tradigital entertainment company, Kroma Entertainment (formerly Sphere Entertainment) through 917Ventures Retirement Fund, which primarily owns Anima and Upstream PH. On the same day, Kroma Entertainment announced its co-ownership with ABS-CBN for its new-offering Pinoy Interactive Entertainment or PIE, with ABS-CBN serving as its main content productions provider while Kroma Entertainment as its technological innovative interaction format backed by 917Ventures, and can be accessible to reach 11 million households in partnership with Broadcast Enterprises and Affiliated Media for digital terrestrial broadcast and 85 million digitally-connected online users.

It started its test broadcast on April 25, 2022, showcasing unprompted daily questions each day until May 15, followed by a seven-day "Countdown to TagumPIE" special on May 16–22, and made its official launch on May 23, 2022. Following the implementation of changes in PIE Channel's programming on September 12, 2022, the channel has been made available to international viewers through its YouTube channel.

On November 24, 2023, Kroma Entertainment announced that the channel will transition as fully online platform starting January 1, 2024. Its terrestrial broadcast on digital free-to-air television, cable and satellite had ceased broadcasting at 11:00 PM of December 31, 2023, with Playlist as its final program aired on the channel.

On June 15, 2024, PIE ceased its operations in both platforms after two years. Viewers encourage to watch its past episodes and online contents in their YouTube channel.

== Final hosts ==
The following list are well-known celebrities and online influencers who served as the channel hosts in their respective programming blocks, dubbed as "PIE jocks":

=== Mukhang Perya ===
- Eric Nicolas (formerly from Sinong Manok Mo)
- Nicki Morena (formerly from PIEnalo, Shoutout TV & Matching Matching)
- Cianne Dominguez
- Gello Marquez (formerly from Pak Palong Follow, Pak Na Pak Palong Follow and Pak Na Pak!)
- Gillian Vicencio (formerly from Para Sa All and Ur Da Boss)
- Kevin Montillano (formerly from PIEnalo, Shoutout TV & Matching Matching)
- Rans Rifol (formerly from The SPG Show)
- Seham Daghlas (formerly from The Chosen One: Soap Opera, The Chosen One: Barkadahan, PIE Shorts and Para Sa All)
- Zendee (formerly from Sinong Manok Mo)
- BB Gurlz (also from Ur Da Boss, formerly from Papa Ng Masa)
  - Angelica
  - Freshe
  - Gigi
  - Ayumi

=== Ur Da Boss ===
- Melai Cantiveros (formerly from The Chosen One: Soap Opera and PIEnalo)
- Jennica Garcia
- BB Gurlz (also from Mukhang Perya, formerly from Papa Ng Masa)
  - Freshe
  - Ayumi
  - Gigi
  - Angelica

=== Watchawin ===
- Robi Domingo

=== Tamang Hinala ===
- Luis Manzano
- Karina Bautista (formerly from The Chosen One: Chugi Night and Para Sa All)

=== Sinong Manok Mo? ===
- Jolina Magdangal
- Bayani Agbayani
- Jackie Gonzaga
- Patsy Reyes (formerly from Barangay PIE)
- Anji Salvacion (formerly from PIE Galingan, Papa Ng Masa and Pak Na Pak!)
- Jeremy Glinoga (formerly from Pak Palong Follow, Pak Na Pak Palong Follow and Pak Na Pak!)
- Nonong Ballinan (formerly from PIEnalo)

=== Relief/guest PIE jocks ===
- Divine Tetay
- Anthony Barion
- Turs Daza
- Lucas Garcia
- Albie Casiño
- Kerwin King
- Gino Roque
- Pretty Trizsa
- Benedix Ramos
- Anthony Jennings
- TJ Valderrama
- Jin Macapagal
- Elyson De Dios
- Brenda Mage
- Shanaia Gomez
- Gail Banawis
- Quincy Villanueva
- JC Alcantara
- AC Bonifacio
- Awra Briguela
- Kaila Estrada
- Krystal Brimner
- Brent Manalo
- Matty Juniosa
- Petite
- Vrix Gallano
- Edward Barber
- Macoy Dubs
- Anton Diva
- Sam Coloso
- Kaori Oinuma
- Amy Perez
- Christian Bables
- Sela Guia
- Euleen Castro
- Gifer Fernandez
- AC Soriano
- Wize Estabillo
- Ana Ramsey
- Beki Velo

=== Unassigned ===
- Andi Abaya (formerly from The Chosen One: Soap Opera and The Chosen One: Barkadahan)
- Luke Alford (formerly from Pak Na Pak Palong Follow, The Chosen One: Soap Opera and The Chosen One: Barkadahan)
- Enzo Almario (formerly from 'Sang Daang PIEnalo and Sinong Manok Mo?)
- Eris Aragoza (formerly from PIE Galingan)
- Janine Berdin (formerly from PIE Borito)
- Samantha Bernardo (formerly from PIE Galingan and PIEnalo)
- Karen Bordador (formerly from PIE Night Long)
- Kobie Brown (formerly from The Chosen One: Soap Opera and The Chosen One: Barkadahan)
- Migs Bustos (formerly from Barangay PIE Silog Sunday)
- Frances Cabatuando (Mayora) (formerly from PIE Silog & Barangay PIE Silog)
- Coco Cordero (formerly from Barangay PIE)
- Nicole Cordoves (formerly from Barangay PIE Silog Sunday)
- Reneé Dominique (formerly from PIE Night Long and PNL Sessions)
- Gretchen Fullido (formerly from Barangay PIE Silog)
- Sela Guia (formerly from PIE Silog, PIE Nalo: Pinoy Games and Dream Maker: Pause & Play)
- Jhong Hilario (formerly from The Chosen One: Soap Opera)
- DJ Jhai Ho (formerly from Dream Maker: Pause & Play)
- Daisy Lopez (Madam Inutz) (formerly from Barangay PIE Silog Sunday)
- Eryka Lucas (formerly from PIE Silog)
- Elmo Magalona (formerly from PNL Sessions)
- Aaron Maniego (formerly from PIE Night Long)
- Dustine Mayores (formerly from The Chosen One: Soap Opera and The Chosen One: Barkadahan)
- Iyah Mina (formerly from Sinong Manok Mo)
- Jae Miranda (formerly from PIE Silog)
- Ruth Paga (formerly from Barangay PIE, PIEnalo and PIE Borito)
- Omar Punzalan (Mayor TV) (formerly from Barangay PIE and Barangay PIE Silog)
- Reign Parani (formerly from Pak! Palong Follow)
- Tristan Ramirez (formerly from PIE Silog & Barangay PIE Silog)
- Eian Rances (formerly from PIEnalo)
- Ryan Morales Reyes (Ninong Ry) (on hiatus)
- Raco Ruiz (formerly from PIE Silog and PIE Borito)
- Alora Sasam (formerly from 'Sang Daang PIEnalo and PIE Shorts)
- Emjay Savilla (formerly from The Chosen One: Soap Opera, The Chosen One: Barkadahan and PIE Shorts)
- Gabb Skribikin (formerly from Dream Maker: Pause & Play, Pak Na Pak Palong Follow, The Chosen One: Soap Opera and The Chosen One: Barkadahan)
- Sunshine Teodoro (formerly from Barangay PIE and The Chosen One: Soap Opera)
- Abby Trinidad (formerly from Barangay PIE and Barangay PIE Silog)
- Amanda Zamora (formerly from The Chosen One: Soap Opera and The Chosen One: Barkadahan)
- Vivoree Esclito (formerly from PNL Sessions, Pak Palong Follow, Pak Na Pak Palong Follow and Pak Na Pak!)
- Aljon Mendoza (formerly from Pak Na Pak!)
- Sheena Belarmino (formerly from Papa Ng Masa and Pak Na Pak!)
- Igiboy Flores (formerly from Papa Ng Masa and Pak Na Pak!)
- Jay R Albino (formerly from PIE Shorts)
- Rob Blackburn (formerly from The Chosen One: Soap Opera, The Chosen One: Barkadahan, PIE Shorts and The Chosen One: Kakatacute)
- Jameson Blake (formerly from The Chosen One: Chugi Night and Para Sa All)
- Joao Constancia (formerly from PIE Shorts)
- Inah Evans (formerly from Barangay PIE, Sinong Manok Mo and The Chosen One: Kakatacute)
- Yamyam Gucong (formerly from The Chosen One: Kakatacute)
- Ishiro Incapas (formerly from PIE Shorts and The Chosen One: Kakatacute)
- Chad Kinis (formerly from The Chosen One: Kakatacute)
- Angeline Quinto (formerly from The Chosen One: Kakatacute)
- Criza Ta-a (formerly from PIE Shorts)
- Kiara Takahashi (formerly from The Chosen One: Kakatacute)
- Maxine Trinidad (formerly from The Chosen One: Soap Opera, The Chosen One: Barkadahan, PIE Shorts and The Chosen One: Kakatacute)
- Kid Yambao (formerly from Sinong Manok Mo and The Chosen One: Kakatacute)
- Ralph Malibunas (formerly from PIE Galingan and Sinong Manok Mo)
- Thamara Alexandria (formerly from Para Sa All)
- Matthew Cruz (formerly from PIE Shorts and Para Sa All)
- Ashley Del Mundo (formerly from Para Sa All)
- Zach Guerrero (formerly from The Chosen One: Soap Opera, The Chosen One: Barkadahan, PIE Shorts and Para Sa All)
- Chierald Tan (formerly from PIE Shorts and Para Sa All)
- Nash Aguas (formerly from Para Sa All) (now married)
- Xyriel Manabat (formerly from Para Sa All)
- Mutya Orquia (formerly from Para Sa All)
- Heaven Peralejo (formerly from Para Sa All)
- Sharlene San Pedro (formerly from Para Sa All)
- Argel Saycon (formerly from The SPG Show)
- Charlie Dizon (formerly from Mga Kwento ng Dilim)
- Ogie Diaz (formerly from Kung Saka-Sakali)
- Negi (formerly from PIEnalo, The SPG Show and Mukhang Perya)

== See also ==
- CgeTV (a similar interactive channel of ABS-CBN on 2010–2012)
- Myx
- Studio 23
