= Antom =

Global merchant payment and digitisation services provider under Ant International

- Company type: Subsidiary
- Industry: Financial technology, Payment processor
- Founded: 2023
- Headquarters: Singapore
- Area served: Worldwide
- Products: Payment processing Fraud prevention
- Services: Merchant acquiring, Cross-border payments, Digitalisation services
- Parent: Ant International
- Website: www.antom.com

Antom is a global merchant payment and digitization services provider under Ant International, a Singapore-based financial technology company, providing digital payment and financial services across international markets. Antom offers unified payment processing, orchestration, digitisation services, and risk management tools for merchants, helping businesses manage transactions, transform digitally, and expand globally.

== History ==
Antom was established in 2023 as part of Ant International’s expansion of its global financial services portfolio. The international business was consolidated under Ant International, a Singapore-headquartered company with an independent board of directors. Antom is part of Ant International’s portfolio of financial services, which also includes the unified wallet gateway Alipay+, the cross-border business account service WorldFirst, and the embedded finance service Bettr.

By 2025, Antom became the primary brand of Ant International for merchant acquiring and payment services. Antom introduced AI-enabled products, including Antom Copilot, an AI assistant for merchants, and an agentic payment solution.

== Products and services ==
Antom provides integration for online and point-of-sale transactions, including payment processing and acquiring, subscription billing, recurring payments, virtual terminal functionality, and fraud detection using AI-driven risk management.

== Technology ==
Antom provides technology and AI-powered tools for payments, risk management, and merchant operations. Antom Copilot 2.0, released in 2025, uses large language models and automation to support onboarding, integration, dispute resolution, and revenue recovery.

Antom’s agentic payment solution enables AI agents to make payments with flexible payment methods, including cards and alternative payment methods, an AI-ready payment mandate model, and enhanced risk management for security.

== Operations ==
Antom operates in more than 200 international markets, processing transactions in over 100 currencies and maintaining an acquiring network in more than 50 countries and regions, including Indonesia, Malaysia, Singapore, Thailand, the Philippines, and Vietnam.

In 2022, Antom acquired a majority stake in 2C2P, a Singapore-based payments platform, to expand its cross-border payment capabilities in emerging markets.

Between 2024 and 2025, Antom partnered with AirAsia MOVE and Booking.com to support cross-border payments in Southeast Asia and collaborated with foodpanda Philippines and MoboPay on a rewards program in the Philippines.

In 2024, MultiSafepay became a subsidiary of Ant International and was integrated with Antom for SME payment services across Europe. Antom also conducted AI-enabled card transaction pilots with Mastercard and Visa in the Asia–Pacific region. Partnerships have included Google Play, Splitit, Adobe, and Deutsche Bank for installment and cross-border payments.

== Recognition ==
- 2024: World Travel Tech Award for World’s Best B2B Travel Payments Provider.
- 2025: Asian Experience Awards (Singapore) for Digital Experience of the Year – Payments and Service Experience of the Year – Payments.
- 2025: Best Merchant Service in Asia Pacific Award from The Asian Banker for the A+ Rewards platform.
