= 917Ventures =

Filipino investment venture capital company

Globe Capital Venture Holdings, Inc.
- Trade name: 917Ventures
- Company type: Private (subsidiary)
- Industry: Investment (venture capital)
- Founded: June 29, 2016; 9 years ago
- Headquarters: W 5th Ave., Bonifacio Global City, Taguig
- Owner: Globe Telecom
- Website: 917ventures.com

Globe Capital Venture Holdings, Inc. (GCVHI), doing business as 917Ventures, is a Philippine-based corporate investment firm. Although it is wholly owned subsidiary of major telecommunications firm Globe Telecom, the company independently operates itself on its own legal entity for the purpose of corporate venture building outside of its parent's core business.

The company has been involved in several projects and joint partnerships in different businesses, with GCash as its flagship product.

== History ==
Globe Capital Venture Holdings, Inc. was formed by Globe Telecom on June 29, 2016, serving its purpose of venture capital on non-core business. In 2019, however, Globe introduced GVCHI's front-facing brand known as 917Ventures. The new brand was named after "917", the prefix mobile phone number assigned to Globe.

In its startup, the company formed a unicorn venture called Mynt Inc., which owns the popular mobile payment service GCash. Mynt is 917Ventures's first joint venture with Globe co-parent Ayala Corporation and China-based Alibaba affiliate Ant Group.

== Assets ==
- AdSpark Inc.
- Global Telehealth, Inc. (KonsultaMD)
- Inquiro
- Kroma Entertainment
- Mynt (formerly Globe Fintech Innovations, Inc.) – 45% ownership; co-owned with Ayala Group and Ant Financial
  - Fuse Lending – mobile financial solutions provider, marketed under the GLoan and GGives brands
  - G-Xchange (GXI) – mobile payment and remittance service, marketed under the GCash brand
- Rappit (in partnership with Puregold) – 50% ownership. Formerly PureGo.
- Rush – 49% ownership
