= 2C2P =

Payment services company

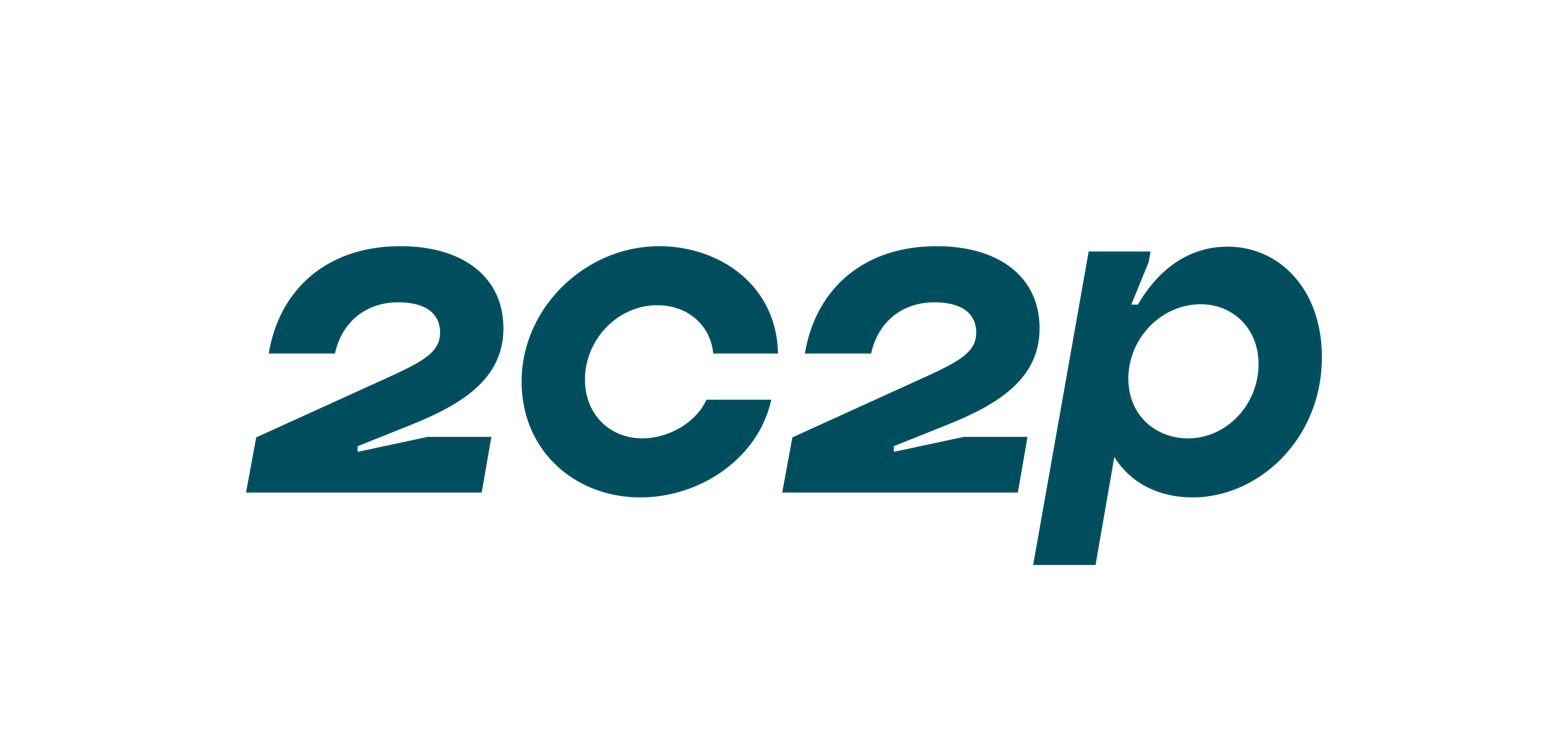
- Type: Private
- Industry: E-commerce payment system, Financial services
- Founded: 2003; 23 years ago
- Founder: Aung Kyaw Moe
- Headquarters: Singapore
- Services: Payment service provider, Payment processing, Payment gateway, Payment card, Mobile Payment
- Number of employees: 400 (2022)
- Website: www.2C2P.com

2C2P is a financial services company headquartered in Singapore. The company primarily provides payment gateway services to businesses.

== Overview ==
Businesses using 2C2P's platform include Lazada, Thai Airways International, and Lenovo.

== History ==
2C2P was founded in Bangkok, Thailand in 2003 by Myanmar-born computer programmer Aung Kyaw Moe. In 2007, the company moved its headquarters to Singapore.

In 2009, 2C2P first secured a seed investment. 2C2P has since received financial backing from venture capitalists Amun Capital, GMO Venture Partners and Digital Media Partners.

In 2012, 2C2P launched an alternative payment method called 123, a local-currency alternative payment channel for non-credit-card payment processing.

In the fiscal year of 2014, the company processed over US$2.2 billion in transactions. Also in 2014, 2C2P partnered with Mastercard to launch easyBills, a platform that enables cardholders to pay utilities, mobile, and other bills via smartphone or the web.

In 2015, 2C2P completed the migration of its services to Amazon Web Services (AWS) and became the first online payment provider offering online credit card installments in Thailand.

In 2018, the company partnered with five major corporations to launch the first QR code payment gateway in Thailand.

In early 2020, 2C2P announced the launch of its investment arm, 2C2P.VC. In late 2020, the company refreshed its branding and website to create a more international and accessible look and feel.

In 2022, the company was named a participant in the Bank of Thailand's retail central bank digital currency (CBDC) pilot testing program.

In April 2022, 2C2P entered a strategic partnership with Chinese financial and payment company Ant Group, with the latter taking on a majority stake and linking Ant's Alipay+ payment service with 2C2P's existing payment gateway platform.

== Products and services ==
2C2P provides payment acceptance, payouts, issuing, digital goods aggregation and reselling services.

The company supports 250 payment methods, including electronic payments, mobile payments, credit cards, and offline payments. The company also aggregates bill payments, digital goods and services - issuing wallets, cards and loyalty programs, and offering mobile top-ups, transportation tickets, and others.

== See also ==
- List of online payment service providers
- Electronic commerce
- Payment gateway
- Payment service provider
