= Eastern Communications =

Telecommunications company in the Philippines

Eastern Telecommunications Philippines, Inc. (ETPI)
- Trade name: Eastern Telecom (1990s–2019); Eastern Communications (2019–present)
- Type: Subsidiary
- Industry: Telecommunications
- Founded: 1878; 148 years ago
- Headquarters: Makati, Philippines
- Services: Fixed telephone, fiber broadband internet, data services
- Owner: PLDT (50%); Globe Telecom (50%)
- Parent: Vega Telecom
- ASN: 9658
- Website: eastern.com.ph

Eastern Telecommunications Philippines, Inc. (ETPI), doing business as Eastern Communications, is the first telecommunications company in the Philippines under Vega Telecom. Founded in 1878 during the final years of the Spanish colonial era, it was the first company to provide telegraphic services.

At present, Eastern Communications offers fixed broadband services in Metro Manila (Makati, Pasay, Ortigas Center, Manila, Quezon City, Caloocan and Navotas), Cavite, Laguna, Baguio, Cebu City, Iloilo and Tuguegarao.

== History ==
=== The early years ===
The company was founded in 1878 as the Eastern Extension Australasia and China Telegraph Company which is a subsidiary of Britain's Cable and Wireless when it was authorized by the Spanish government to provide its first telegraph services. It was also authorized to construct and operate the first submarine cable linking the Philippines and Hong Kong. It later gained its 50-year franchise under Republic Act No. 808 in 1952, and later amended under Republic Act No. 5002 in 1967.

In 1974, President Ferdinand Marcos signed Presidential Decree No. 489, authorized the transfer of Eastern Extension's franchise to a newly established firm Eastern Telecommunications Philippines (ETPI). The firm was co-owned by Universal Molasses Corporation (UNIMOLCO), and a consortium led by three businessmen (collectively known themselves as the "BAN Group") who were cronies of the Marcoses: Jose L. Africa, Manuel H. Nieto Jr., and Roberto Benedicto.

After the EDSA People Power Revolution in 1986, the Aquino administration thru the Presidential Commission on Good Government (PCGG) sequestered all of the companies controlled by Marcos cronies, including ETPI. In 1992, PCGG and Benedicto signed a compromise agreement wherein Benedicto surrendered 51% of his equity stake in ETPI. Meanwhile, UNIMOLCO sold its own shares to First Pacific-backed telecommunications firm Smart Communications. In 1995, the Sandiganbayan issued a case on crony capitalism against the Marcoses and their cronies on the recovery of their ill-gotten wealth businesses.

ETPI was granted a new 25-year legislative franchise under Republic Act No. 9172 enacted on October 3, 2002.

=== Privatization ===
In 2005, the Philippine government, thru its national privatization program, sold its 57% stake in ETPI to businessman and former Trade Minister of the Marcos administration Roberto Ongpin through ISM Communications Corporation. In October 2007, Ongpin spent P100 million to acquire Smart's stake in ETPI, raising to 67.5%. The following year, the government officially sold its remaining stake to ISM.

In 2011, the San Miguel Corporation subsidiary Vega Telecom bought 40% stake in ETPI after ISM sold AGN Philippines (which owned the said stake) to Vega. SMC later bought the remaining stake thru another subsidiary (San Miguel Equity Securities) after ISM divested its own in ETPI.

=== PLDT-Globe era ===
On May 30, 2016, SMC announced its selling of Vega Telecom and its subsidiaries (including ETPI) to the joint owners PLDT and Globe Telecom, with the deal closed on May 30, 2017.

In August 2019, Eastern provided a digital kiosk named MNLKonek (initially known as Iskonek) in partnership with the City Government of Manila which offers free Wi-Fi connection, calls, and phone charging. It was launched first at the Bonifacio Shrine and has since been expanded to 34 units along España Boulevard by the following year.

In 2019, the Sandiganbayan Third Division ordered 15 heirs of Marcos cronies Africa and Nieto to surrender all of their shares in ETPI. It upheld its decision the following year.

In February 2021, Eastern announced a nationwide upgrade program with the company spending a budget of ₱2.8 billion to expand its services in Davao City, Cagayan de Oro, Dumaguete, Tagbilaran, Bacolod, Roxas, Kalibo, Caticlan, Boracay, Naga, Legazpi, Iriga and Sorsogon province. The company's network modernization projects was started in 2020 despite the COVID-19 pandemic which includes its expansion in Iloilo and Tuguegarao.

== Services ==
Eastern Communications currently offers fixed broadband, telephone and fiber internet services in commercial and residential areas.
