= Kroma Entertainment =

Philippine media and entertainment company

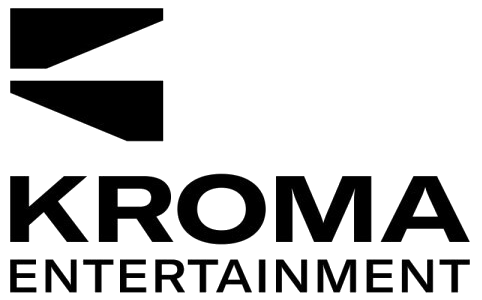
- Formerly: Sphere Entertainment (2016–2022)
- Type: Private
- Industry: Entertainment
- Founded: 2016; 10 years ago
- Headquarters: 3/F Globe Telecom Plaza I, Pioneer corner Madison Streets, Mandaluyong, Metro Manila, Philippines
- Key people: Ian Monsod (CEO); Jil Bausa-Go (SVP For Kroma); Cheska Silayan (FVP For Kroma); Alex D. Asuncion (VP For Kroma)
- Services: Film and television production; Digital content; Event management; Consumer service
- Parent: 917Ventures Retirement Fund (Globe Telecom Group)
- Website: kroma.ph

Kroma Entertainment, commonly known as simply Kroma (stylized in all caps), is a Philippine media and entertainment company engaging in film, television, events, production, digital content management and other media-related businesses. It is financially backed by Globe Telecom through 917Ventures' Retirement Fund agency.

== History ==
Kroma was launched by the Globe Telecom Group in 2016 as Sphere Entertainment, as the latter continued its expansion of new ventures outside telecommunications. Sphere established film/TV production outlet Globe Studios and live concert/event management Globe Live. It also partnered with domestic and international media companies and brands like Spotify, NBA League Pass, Disney, Netflix and Astro to provide content distribution and consumer services to Globe subscribers.

In July 2020, Globe and Sphere formed a partnership with U.S.-based music label 88rising to launch the localized label Paradise Rising. In November 2020, Globe and Sphere also partnered with filmmakers Erik Matti and Dondon Monteverde to launch Upstream PH, a subscription video-on-demand and streaming service. It became the official provider of the 2020 Metro Manila Film Festival.

In 2022, Sphere was renamed as Kroma Entertainment, while its flagship brands Globe Studios and Globe Live were renamed into Anima and LiveMNL respectively. On April 6, 2022, Kroma was formally launched under its "tradigital" platform (traditional and digital media) with new additional brands engaged in publishing, talent management, production and B2B services. It was also announced by Kroma that it formed a joint-venture with ABS-CBN Corporation and 917Ventures for Pinoy Interactive Entertainment (PIE), a new multi-platform channel aired in May 2022 via BEAM TV's digital broadcast.

== Ownership ==
917Ventures, a corporate venture investment and retirement pension firm that owns Globe's consumer and e-commerce platforms, financially invests the company through its Philippine Depository Receipts. Globe Telecom does not directly own any media property as the current 1987 Constitution states that media companies should be 100% owned by Filipinos and the company's major shareholder is Singtel.

== Brands ==
- ANIMA (formerly Globe Studios) - film, television and podcast production
- KROMA PubCo - digital publishing
- LiveMNL (formerly Globe Live) - events management
- NYMA - artist/talent agency
- Paradise Rising - local music label (in partnership with 88rising)
- Secret Menu - production house

== Previous Brands ==
- PIE (Pinoy Interactive Entertainment) - a digital interactive channel/platform (in partnership with BEAM TV and ABS-CBN)
- Upstream PH - streaming and subscription video-on-demand (SVOD) service
