= Globe Telecom =

Philippine telecommunications company

Globe Telecom, Inc.
- Logo used since 2021
- Formerly: Globe Wireless Limited (1935–1965); Globe-Mackay (1965–1991); GMCR, Inc. (1991–1998)
- Type: Public
- Traded as: PSE: GLO
- Industry: Telecommunications; Remittance; Mass media
- Predecessors: Mackay Radio & Telegraph Company; Philippine Press Wireless; Clavecilla Radio Corporation
- Founded: Manila, Philippine Islands (January 15, 1935; 91 years ago) (SEC No.: PW-1177)
- Headquarters: The Globe Tower, 2608 7th Avenue, Bonifacio Global City, Taguig, Metro Manila, Philippines
- Area served: Philippines
- Key people: Cezar P. Consing (Chairman); Carl Raymond R. Cruz (President and CEO); Juan Carlo Puno (CFO)
- Products: Mobile telephony Fixed-line telephony Broadband services
- Revenue: ▲ ₱162.33 billion (FY 2023)
- Net income: ▼ ₱24.58 billion (FY 2023)
- Total assets: ▲ ₱611.63 billion (FY 2023)
- Owner: (See ownership)
- Number of employees: 7,542 (2023)
- Subsidiaries: BayanTel; Innove Communications; Kickstart; Yondu; 917Ventures; GTI; Asticom; Bethlehem Holdings; Kroma Entertainment
- ASNs: 4775 (Primary ASN); 132199 (Secondary ASN)
- Website: www.globe.com.ph

Globe Telecom, Inc., commonly known as Globe, is a Philippine telecommunications company headquartered in Bonifacio Global City, Taguig. It operates one of the largest mobile, fixed-line and broadband networks in the Philippines. As of November 2025, Globe has 63.1 million subscribers, making it the most-subscribed telecommunications network in the Philippines.

The company's principal shareholders are Ayala Corporation and Singtel. It is listed on the Philippine Stock Exchange under the ticker symbol GLO.

Globe offers commercial wireless services through its 2G, 3G, 3.5G HSPA+, 4G LTE, and LTE-A networks, with 5G currently being deployed in key areas in the Philippines. Its 5G coverage is available in over 3,000 locations all over the country, and nearly 100% of the population in the National Capital Region, Davao City, and Cebu.

Its general competitors are the long-established PLDT and startup Dito Telecommunity, while it also competes with Converge ICT (on a national scale) in the fixed wired internet business.

== History ==
Logo from 1991–2007

Logo from 2007–2013

Logo from 2013–2021

On December 8, 1928, the Philippine Legislature passed Act No. 3495 granting the Robert Dollar Company (a corporation organized and existing under the laws of the State of California), a franchise to operate wireless long-distance message services in the Philippines. Subsequently, the Legislature passed Act No. 4150 on November 28, 1934, to transfer the franchise and privileges of the Robert Dollar Company to Globe Wireless Limited, which was incorporated in the Philippines on January 15, 1935.

In 1965, Globe Wireless Limited was merged with Mackay Radio & Telegraph Company and Philippine Press Wireless to form Globe-Mackay Cable and Radio Corporation ("Globe-Mackay"), with the transfer of Mackay's franchise to Globe Wireless Limited approved by the Congress through Republic Act No. 4491 enacted on June 19, 1965. By Republic Act No. 4630 enacted in the same date by the Congress, its franchise was further expanded to allow Globe-Mackay to operate international communications systems.

In 1974, Ayala Corporation began its investing in Globe-Mackay. It offered its shares to the public on August 11, 1975, becoming the first telecommunications company in the country to do so.

Globe-Mackay was granted a new franchise on December 24, 1980, by Batasang Pambansa, under Batas Pambansa Blg. 95, extending it for 50 years.

In 1991, it merged with Clavecilla Radio Corporation, a domestic telecommunications pioneer, to form GMCR, Inc. The merger gave GMCR the capability to provide all forms of telecommunications to address the international and domestic requirements of its customers. The merger was also approved by the Congress through Republic Act No. 7229 enacted on March 19, 1992, which amended its franchise.

In 1993, Globe partnered with Singapore Telecom, Inc. (STI), a wholly owned subsidiary of Singapore Telecommunications Limited ("Singtel"), after Ayala and STI signed a memorandum of understanding.

On August 20, 1998, GMCR was renamed as Globe Telecom, Inc.

In 2001, Globe acquired Isla Communications Company, Inc. ("Islacom"), in a joint venture setup with Deutsche Telekom as foreign partner. It became its wholly owned subsidiary effective on June 27, 2001. Deutsche Telekom eventually sold its share to Singtel.

In 2003, the National Telecommunications Commission ("NTC") granted Globe's application to transfer its fixed-line business assets and subscribers to Islacom, pursuant to its strategy to integrate all of its fixed line services under the latter. Subsequently, Islacom was renamed as Innove Communications, Inc.

In 2004, Globe invested in G-Xchange, Inc. ("GXI"), a wholly owned subsidiary, to handle the mobile payment and remittance service marketed under the GCash brand using Globe Telecom's network as transport channel. GXI started commercial operations on October 16, 2004. In late 2019, the GCash brand was refreshed by global branding and design agency Serious Studio. That brand refresh was suggested by Ant Financial, Globe's venture partner in GCash (by way of Mynt, GXI's successor company).

In November 2004, Globe and seven other leading Asia-Pacific mobile operators ("JV Partners") signed an agreement ("JV agreement") to form Bridge Alliance. The joint venture company operates through a Singapore-incorporated company, Bridge Mobile Pte. Limited (BMPL) which serves as a commercial vehicle for the JV partners to build and establish a regional mobile infrastructure and common service platform to deliver different regional mobile services to their subscribers. The Bridge Alliance has a combined customer base of over 900 million subscribers among its partners in Asia Pacific, Middle East, Africa, Europe, and the Americas.

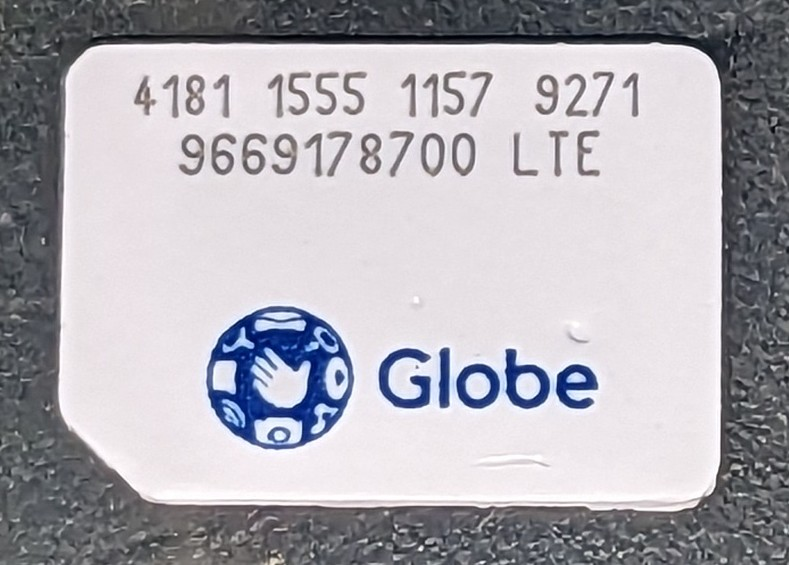
A Globe SIM card

In 2005, Innove was awarded by the National Telecommunications Commission (NTC) with a nationwide franchise for its fixed line business, allowing it to operate a Local Exchange Carrier service nationwide and expand its network coverage. In December 2005, the NTC approved Globe Telecom's application for third generation (3G) radio frequency spectra to support the upgrade of its cellular mobile telephone system ("CMTS") network to be able to provide 3G services. Globe was assigned with 10-Megahertz (MHz) of the 3G radio frequency spectrum.

On May 19, 2008, following the approval of the NTC, the subscribers contracts of Touch Mobile (TM) prepaid service were transferred from Innove to Globe, which now operates all wireless prepaid services using its integrated cellular networks.

In August 2008, and to further grow its mobile data segment, Globe acquired 100% ownership of Entertainment Gateway Group ("EGG"), a leading mobile content provide in the Philippines. EGG Group is engaged in the development and creation of wireless products and services accessible through telephones or other forms of communication devices. It also provides internet and mobile value added services, information technology and technical services including software development and related services. EGGC was registered with the then Department of Transportation and Communications (DOTC) as a content provider. On May 15, 2014, EGGC changed its corporate name from Entertainment Gateway Group Corp. to Yondu, Inc. (Yondu).

On October 30, 2008, Globe, the Bank of the Philippine Islands and Ayala Corporation signed a memorandum of agreement to form a joint venture that would allow rural and low-income customers' access to financial products and services. In October 2009, the Bangko Sentral ng Pilipinas (BSP) approved the sale and transfer by BPI of its shares of stock in Pilipinas Savings Bank, Inc. (PSBI), formalizing the creation of the venture. Globe Telecom's and BPI's ownership stakes in PSBI is at 40% each, while AC's shareholding is at 20%. The partners plan to transform PSBI (now called BPI Globe BanKO, Inc.) into the country's first mobile microfinance bank. The bank's initial focus will be on wholesale lending to other microfinance institutions but will eventually expand to include retail lending, deposit-taking, and micro-insurance. BPI Globe BanKO opened its first branch in Metro Manila in the first quarter of 2011 and now has 6 branches nationwide, over 2,000 partner outlets, 261,000 customers and over P2.4 billion in its wholesale loan portfolio.

On November 25, 2008, Globe formed GTI Business Holdings, Inc. (GTIBH) primarily to act as an investment company. In March 2012, Globe launched Kickstart Ventures, Inc. (Kickstart) to help, support and develop the dynamic and growing community of technopreneurs in the Philippines. Kickstart is a business incubator that is focused on providing aspiring technopreneurs with the efficient environment and the necessary mechanisms to start their own business. Since its launch, Kickstart has 10 companies in its portfolio covering the digital media and technology, and web/mobile platform space.

In May 2013, ABS-CBN Convergence, Inc. ("ABS-C", formerly Multimedia Telephony, Inc.) announced the launch of its mobile brand, ABS-CBNmobile. The launch of the new mobile brand is being supported through a network sharing agreement with Globe, wherein the latter provides network capacity and coverage to ABS-C on a nationwide basis. ABS-C formally launched the brand on November 26, 2013.

In October 2013, following the court's approval of the Amended Rehabilitation Plan (jointly filed by Globe and BayanTel in May 2013), Globe acquired a 38% interest in BayanTel by converting BayanTel's unsustainable debt into common shares. This follows Globe Telecom's successful tender offer for close to 97% of BayanTel's outstanding indebtedness as of December 2012. As part of the amended rehab plan and pending regulatory approvals, Globe would further convert a portion of its sustainable debt into common shares of BayanTel, bringing up its stake to around 56%. In October 2014, Globe Telecom received a copy of the temporary restraining order (TRO) issued by the Court of Appeals stopping the National Telecommunications Commission's (NTC) proceedings in connection with the bid of Globe Telecom Inc. to take over Bayan Telecommunications Inc. (BayanTel). Despite the lapse of the Temporary Restraining Order (TRO) last December 9, 2014, the Court of Appeals has advised the NTC to refrain from conducting any proceedings in connection with the bid of Globe assume majority control of BayanTel.

On June 3, 2014, Globe signed an agreement with Azalea Technology, Inc. and SCS Computer Systems, acquiring the entire ownership stake in Asticom. Asticom, a systems integrator and information technology services provider to domestic and international markets, is 49% owned by Azalea, a 100%-owned subsidiary of Ayala Corporation and 51% owned by SCS Computer Systems, a subsidiary of Singapore Telecom.

On June 30, 2015, Globe incorporated Global Capital Venture Holdings, Inc., a wholly owned subsidiary organized under the laws of the Philippines and formed for the purpose of venturing into strategic non-core business.

On August 27, 2015, Globe Telecom, Inc. (Globe), Ayala Corporation (AC), and Bank of the Philippine Islands (BPI) signed an agreement to transfer full ownership of BPI Globe BanKO (BanKO) to BPI, one of the majority owners of the joint venture.

In 2016, Globe introduced its Globe Lifestyle brand as a way to connect to its customers through fashion. It also launched two entertainment divisions: Anima (formerly Globe Studios), which focuses on film and television production, and LiveMNL (formerly Globe Live), which focuses on live concerts and musical events.

In 2017, Globe Telecom's CEO, Ernest Cu was named the CEO of the year by the World Communication Awards 2017.

In 2018, Globe Telecom was selected as the best workplace in Asia by Malaysia-based " Asia Corporate Excellence & Sustainability Awards (ACES).". and the proposal to extend the internet in Europe was made.

On December 14, 2018, Philippine President Rodrigo Duterte signed Republic Act No. 11151 which renewed Innove's legislative franchise for another 25 years. The law granted Innove a franchise to construct, establish, install, lease, co-use, purchase, operate and maintain all types of mobile and fixed wireless telecommunications, and use all the apparatus, conduits, appliances, receivers, transmitters, antennas, satellites and equipment necessary for the transmission/reception of data, messages, videos and signals, with the corresponding technological auxiliaries, facilities, distribution or relay stations, throughout the Philippines.

On October 1, 2020, Globe Telecom launched GOMO PH, the country's first fully digital telco.

In Opensignal's April report on internet speed contest, Dito Telecommunity outplaced Smart Communications and Globe Telecom in the first quarter, with a download speed of 32 Mbps. It is also now the fastest operator for 5G, averaging 302.9 Mbit/s as against Smart's 143.3 Mbit/s. In the reliability experience of subscribers, it further scored 835 out of 1,000 to breaking Smart's 771 and Globe's 748.

On early February 2026, it launched a public offer for non-voting preferred shares for five and ten-year tenors.

On May 26, 2026, it launched its own affordable subscription-based cloud storage service Globe Cloud, partnering with American-based technology company Synchronoss Technologies.

== Subscribers ==
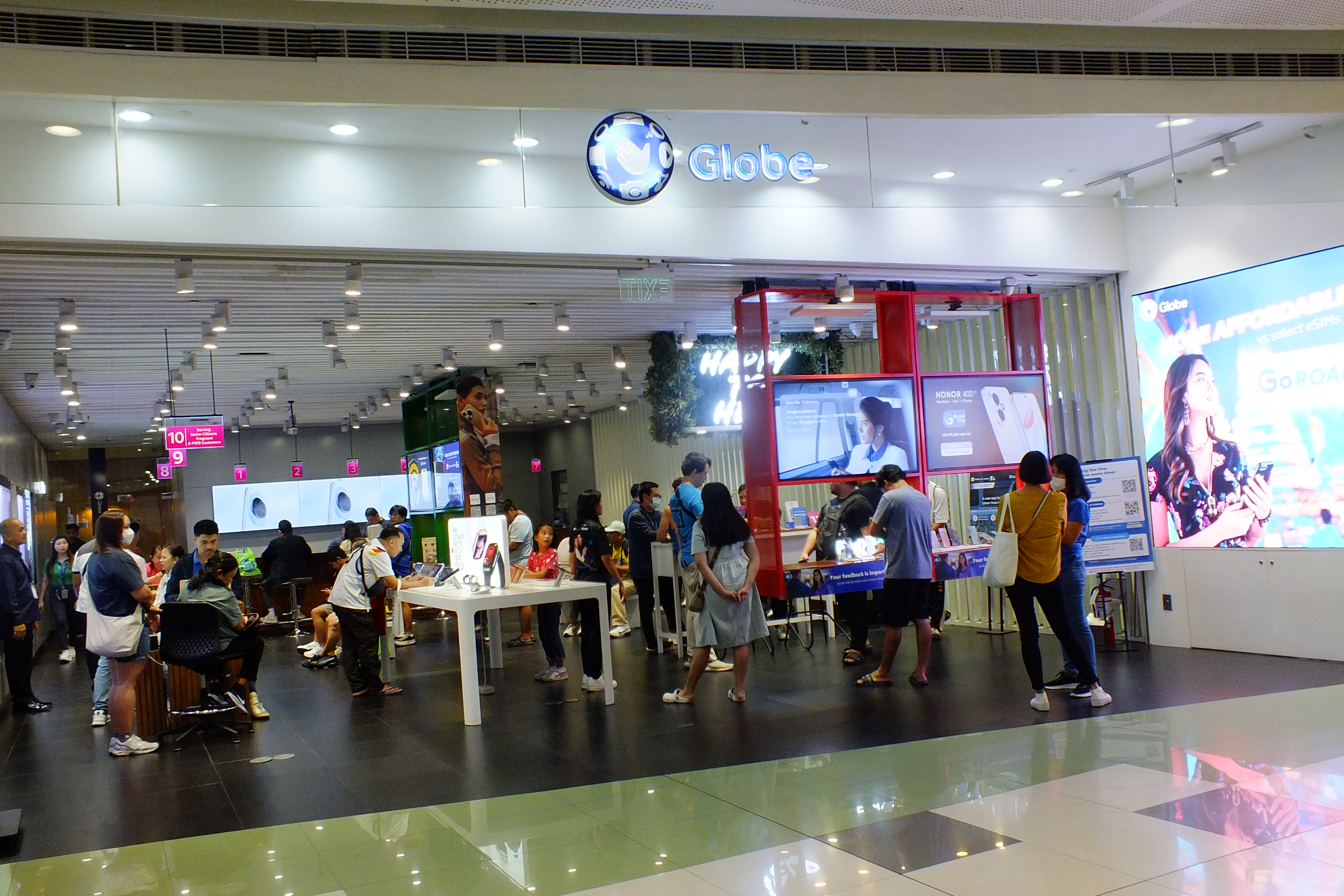
Globe flagship store at SM Mall of Asia

In Q3 2016, Globe Telecom dislodged Smart Communications as the largest telecommunications company it terms of subscriber base with 65.8 million subscribers, 200,000 more than its rival.

As of December 2022, Globe's total mobile subscriber base reached 87.9 million. It is also the country's largest telecommunications company in terms of market capitalization. However, by virtue of SIM Registration Act and due to deactivation of unregistered Globe SIM cards, the number of subscribers went down to 48.4 million as of July 26, 2023. The company now becomes second to Smart Communications in terms of subscriber base which has 50.0 million. At the end of a 5-day grace period, it again increased to 53,727,298 subscribers causing them to regain the title as the largest telecom company. Out of its total 86,746,672 subscribers or 61.94% of its total subscriber base prior, the company lost 33,019,374 SIM cards to deactivation.

As of November 2023, Globe has about 54.7 million subscribers, making it the second largest network in terms of subscriber base.

As of November 2025, Globe has 63.2 million subscribers, regaining its status as the network with the largest subscriber base in the country.

== Radio frequency summary ==
Frequencies used by Globe Telecom
Frequency	Protocol	Class	Band Number	Duplex Mode	Common name
900 MHz	GSM/GPRS/EDGE	2G	8	FDD	E-GSM
1800 MHz	GSM/GPRS/EDGE	2G	3	FDD	DCS
700 MHz	LTE/LTE-A/LTE-A Pro	4G	28	FDD	APT
900 MHz	LTE/LTE-A/LTE-A Pro	4G	8	FDD	E-GSM
1800 MHz	LTE/LTE-A/LTE-A Pro	4G	3	FDD	DCS
2100 MHz	LTE/LTE-A/LTE-A Pro	4G	1	FDD	IMT
2300 MHz	LTE/LTE-A/LTE-A Pro	4G	40	TDD	S band
2500 MHz	LTE/LTE-A/LTE-A Pro	4G	41	TDD	BRS
2600 MHz	LTE/LTE-A/LTE-A Pro	4G	38	TDD	IMT-E
700 MHz	NR	5G	n28	FDD	APT
2600 MHz	NR	5G	n41	TDD	BRS
3500 MHz	NR	5G	n78	TDD	C-Band
4500 MHz	NR	5G	n79	TDD	C-Band

== Ownership ==
Updated shareholding structure as of December 31, 2025:, with Foreign Percentage at 25.36% ( ordinarily^{^} maximum 50%), as of November 30, 2025.

Major Shareholder	% of Total*	Common Shares	Preferred Shares*
Asiacom Philippines, Inc. (joint venture of Ayala Corporation & SingTel)	52.3180%	—	158,515,017
SingTel	22.2386%	67,379,310	—
Ayala Corporation	14.6102%	44,266,630	—
Public Stock (including PCD Nominee**)	10.4311%	31,604,573	—
Directors, Officers	0.0608%	480,996	4
Others - Employees	0.3412%	1,033,650	—
Total Voting Equity	302,983,545 (100%)	144,468,524 (47.68%)	158,515,021 (52.32%)

* In Gamboa v. Finance Secretary Teves (G.R. No. 176579 | June 28, 2011) of which industry competitor PLDT was ultimately in the center of the case, and affirmed in Roy vs. Herbosa (G.R. No. 207246, April 18, 2017), the Supreme Court of the Philippines ruled that under Section 11, Article XII of the Constitution, “capital” in a public utility refers only to shares entitled to vote in the election of directors. Thus, Preferred shares that have been vested with such power are included in the relevant computations, in addition to common shares that naturally are appurtenant with voting privileges in every aspect.
** While the Philippine Central Depository (PCD) is listed a major shareholder, it is more of a trustee-nominee for all shares lodged in the PCD system rather than a single owner/shareholder. Major beneficial shareholders (i.e. those who own at least 5% of outstanding capital stock with voting rights) hidden, if any, under the PCD system are identified and are disclosed with the Definitive Information Statement that companies are required to make available to shareholders (as well as be submitted to the local bourse and Securities and Exchange Commission) weeks before annual and special stockholders' meetings.
^ With the passage of Republic Act No. 11659, a telecom company can now be owned 100% by foreigners subject to certain requirements such as reciprocity and clearance by the Philippine government

== Subsidiaries ==
- 917Ventures – 100% ownership
  - AdSpark Inc.
  - Global Telehealth, Inc. (KonsultaMD)
  - Inquiro – 49% ownership
  - Mynt (formerly Globe Fintech Innovations, Inc.) – 45% ownership; co-owned with Ayala Group and Ant Financial
    - Fuse Lending – mobile financial solutions provider, marketed under the GLoan and GGives brands
    - G-Xchange (GXI) – mobile payment and remittance service, marketed under the GCash brand
  - Rappit (in partnership with Puregold) – 50% ownership. Formerly PureGo.
  - Rush – 49% ownership
- Asticom Technology, Inc. – 100% ownership
- Bayan Telecommunications, Inc. (BayanTel) – 98.57% ownership
- Flipside Publishing Services, Inc. (FPSI) – 40% ownership
- GTI Business Holdings (GTI) – 100% ownership
- Innove Communications, Inc. (Innove) – 100% ownership
- Kickstart Ventures, Inc. (Kickstart) – 100% ownership
- Kroma
- Yondu (formerly Entertainment Gateway Group Corp.) – 100% ownership

== Joint ventures ==
- ABS-CBN Convergence – 32% ownership
- Bridge Mobile – 10% ownership
- Cherry Mobile Prepaid
- Vega Telecom – 50% ownership

== Affiliates ==
- AF Payments, Inc. – 20% ownership

== Mass media and entertainment ==
- Bethlehem Holdings Inc. (BHI) – a media investment firm through its group's funded retirement pension agency.
  - Altimax Broadcasting Company (Altimax) – 86% ownership; co-owned with Velarde, Inc. (14%)
  - Broadcast Enterprises and Affiliated Media (BEAM) – 100% ownership
- Kroma Entertainment (formerly Sphere Entertainment) – a multi-platform innovative tradigital (traditional and digital) entertainment company launched on April 6, 2022, backed by 917Ventures Retirement Fund.
  - Anima (formerly Globe Studios) – film and entertainment production.
  - FreebieMNL – digital destination magazine targeting food and lifestyle.
  - LiveMNL (formerly Globe Live) – live events and activations production agency.
  - Now You Must Aspire (NYMA) – talent arm and management center.
  - Paradise Rising – in partnership with 88rising; music label and collective agency representing Filipino artists.
  - Pinoy Interactive Entertainment (PIE) – co-owned with ABS-CBN Corporation and 917Ventures, in partnership with BEAM TV as one of the flagship property; real-time multi-format, multi-platform and multi-screen tradigital interactive entertainment channel launched on May 23, 2022.
  - Secret Menu – full service creative video production studio.
  - Upstream – digital over-the-top platform and streaming media service.
  - Wonder – digital oriented magazine targeting pop culture and style.

== Esports ==
Globe Telecom and MET Events organized the Philippine Pro Gaming League. In its first season, it only had 3 games Dota 2, Tekken 7, and Arena of Valor with ₱800,000 prize pool. The second season increased the prize pool to ₱1.3-million, had 4 games: League of Legends, Tekken 7, Rules of Survival, and Arena of Valor and a Mobile Legends: Bang Bang corporate league added later on.

== See also ==
- Ayala Corporation
- TM (cellular service)
- GCash
