= Tianhong Asset Management =

Chinese asset manager

Tianhong Asset Management Co., Ltd.
- Native name: 天弘基金管理有限公司
- Company type: Subsidiary
- Industry: Financial services
- Founded: 8 November 2004; 21 years ago
- Headquarters: Tianjin, China
- AUM: US$186 billion (Q2 2022)
- Parent: Ant Financial (51%)
- Website: www.thfund.com.cn

Tianhong Asset Management Co., Ltd. (Chinese: 天弘基金管理有限公司; pinyin: Tiānhóng jījīn guǎnlǐ yǒuxiàn gōngsī) is a Chinese asset management company founded in 2004. From 2014 it was considered the largest asset management company in China until 2021. Its most notable product is the Tianhong Yu'e Bao fund which at one point was the world's largest money market fund.

== History ==
Tianhong Asset Management was set up on 8 November 2004.

In October 2013, the Alibaba Group acquired a 51% stake in the company for 1.18 billion RMB from its original shareholders, Tianjin Trust, Inner Mongolia Junzheng Energy & Chemical Group and Wuhu High-tech Investment. The company would be under the Ant Financial, an affiliate of Alibaba. However, in 2014 there was a dispute between Ant Financial and Inner Mongolia Junzheng Energy & Chemical Group on the treatment of Tianhong's retained profits per the deal agreement. Ant Financial announced it had initiated arbitration action by applying to the China International Economic and Trade Arbitration Commission. In February 2015, the court ruled in favour of Ant Financial.

In June 2013, Alipay launched a financial product platform called Yu'e Bao (余额宝). Tianhong would partner with Alipay to launch Yu'e Bao to the public by allowing Alipay customers convert the idle cash in their accounts into units of a money market fund. The product would be known as the Tianhong Yu'e Bao fund. Due to the popularity of the fund, Tianhong became the largest asset management company in China. In 2019, it was reported it was the world's largest money market fund, with over 588 million users, or more than a third of China's population, contributing cash to it. However, by 2020, it was no longer the world's largest money market fund due to tighter regulation and growing competition.

On 9 September 2023, Tianhong Asset Manager announced that Wang Dengfeng, the portfolio manager of the Yu'e Bao fund for over 10 years would resign from his role. The fund afterwards would be jointly managed by three portfolio managers.
