= Vega Telecom =

Telecommunications company in the Philippines

Vega Telecom Inc.
- Type: Subsidiary
- Industry: Telecommunications
- Area served: Philippines
- Services: Wireless Telephony; Broadband Internet
- Parent: PLDT (50%); Globe Telecom (50%)
- Subsidiaries: Bell Tel; Eastern Communications; Liberty Telecoms; Express Telecom; Hi-Frequency Telecommunications, Inc.

Vega Telecom Inc. is a Filipino telecommunications company jointly owned by Globe Telecom and PLDT. It was established as a holding company of San Miguel Corporation for its various telecommunications investments. In separate statements on May 30, 2016, Globe Telecom and PLDT each acquired half of Vega Telecom from San Miguel Corporation for ₱69.1 billion. The acquisition entailed ₱52.08 billion for 100% equity interest in Vega Telecom and the assumption of around ₱17.02 billion of liabilities. The deal was closed on May 30, 2017.

== Subsidiaries ==
- Bell Telecommunications Philippines, Inc.
- Eastern Telecommunications Philippines Inc.
- Liberty Telecommunications Holdings, Inc.
- Cobaltpoint Telecommunications Philippines, Inc. (formerly Express Telecom)
- Hi-Frequency Telecommunications, Inc.
- Tori Spectrum Telecommunications, Inc.
