= Express Telecom =

Mobile virtual network operator in the Philippines

Express Telecommunication Company, Inc.
- Company type: Private
- Industry: Communications Services
- Founded: Manila, Philippines (December 1988)
- Headquarters: Pasig, Philippines
- Key people: Felomena Veto, President
- Products: Cellular Telephony; Information Technology Services

Express Telecommunication Company, Inc. (commonly known as Express Telecom or Extelcom) is a subsidiary of Vega Telecom. It was the Philippines' first mobile phone network operator and operated an analog AMPS network.

== History ==
Established in December 1988, Extelcom was granted a provisional authority to install, operate and maintain a Cellular Mobile Telephone System (CMTS) in Metro Manila by the National Telecommunications Commission. In May 1989, limited operations commenced with the installation of Extelcom's first switch in Antipolo and three cell sites in Metro Manila. The company initially offered cellular technology with service features including call forwarding, call waiting, and three-way conferencing. It was assigned the area codes 973 and 974 (presently not in use). In October 1992, Extelcom was granted a certificate of public convenience and necessity (CPCN) by the NTC. Extelcom is the only CMTS operator in the Philippines with a CPCN. Extelcom introduced the first cellular prepaid card in the country, "Cellcard".

It has 10 MHz on the 800 bandwidth for its analog network. The NTC in September 2001 gave Extelcom 5 MHz frequency in the 1800 bandwidth for its planned GSM operations. It dropped its GSM plans in 2003 in favor of deploying a network based on the CDMA protocol.

In July 2015, Vega Telecom acquired Extelcom from the group of Roberto Ongpin and the Ashmore Group.

== Services ==
- Express Unlimited Plans
  - Express Unlimited Luzon and Metro Manila
  - Express Unlimited Visayas and Mindanao
  - Express Unlimited National (nationwide coverage)
- Prepaid Cellcard
  - Pinaka Cellcard
- Value Added Services
  - Call Forwarding
  - Call waiting
  - Three-way Call Conference
  - Express IDD
  - International Roaming
- Express Tawag Center

== Call Center Business Solutions ==
- Wireless Connection (Microwave radio link)
  - This set-up provides dedicated clear channel wireless connectivity across two or more points. Extelcom utilizes its service areas via cellsites located nationwide;
- Physical Connection
  - Using the facilities of Extelcom's other business partners, this set-up provides dedicated clear channel and physical (wired) connectivity across two or more locations.
