= TNT (cellular service) =

Mobile virtual network operator in the Philippines

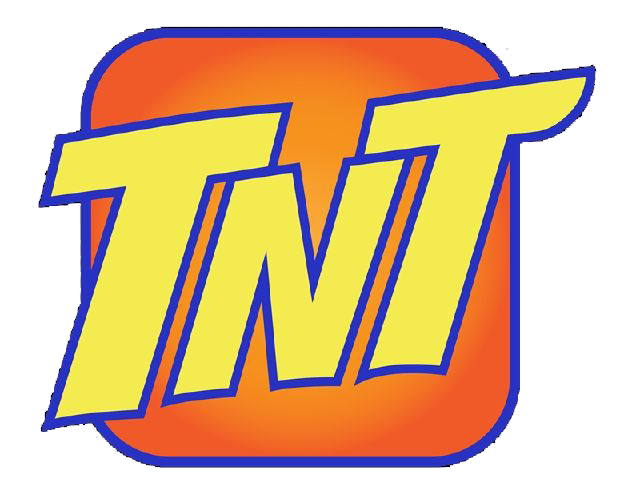
- Industry: Communications services
- Founded: January 1, 2000; 26 years ago (as Talk 'N Text)
- Headquarters: Manila, Philippines
- Key people: Manuel V. Pangilinan, CEO
- Products: Cellular telephony
- Owner: PLDT
- Parent: Smart Communications
- Website: http://tntph.com/

TNT (formerly known as Piltel, Mobiline, Phone Pal, and still unofficially known as Talk 'N Text) is a cellular service of Smart Communications in the Philippines. By April 2000, Piltel launched its GSM brand, Talk 'N Text. Piltel also reported 16,590,737 subscribers to its GSM brand, Talk 'N Text, before its transfer to Smart. Piltel used the 912 area code for its AMPS/CDMA service. However, it is now used for TNT.

TNT is known for its low-cost packages, catering mostly to the mobile needs of the masses of the Philippines. From classics like Gaan Text 10 to unlimited offers like Unlitext Extra 30, TNT provides a wide range of offerings in call, text, mobile internet, and other value-added services.

Talk 'N Text logo used from 2000 to 2010.

== Products and services ==
TNT offers a variety of services, including SMS, Voice, Combo, Internet, and Load Services. Some of the SMS services include UnliTxt2all 20, which provides subscribers with unlimited texts to all networks, and GaanTxt10, which offers 100 SMS to TNT/Smart plus 10 SMS to all networks. There are also voice services, such as Sangkatutok15, which provides 20 minutes of calls to TNT/Smart subscribers for two days.

Combo offers are designed to combine SMS and voice services in one package. For example, the Unlitxt Extra 30 provides subscribers with free texts to TNT/Smart numbers for three days, along with 15 minutes of calls to TNT/Smart. Some combo plans may have specific peak periods, such as Unlitalkplus20, which features unlimited calls to TNT/Smart from 10 PM to 5 PM and unlimited texts to TNT/Smart throughout the day. Additionally, there are internet plans for prepaid mobile devices, such as AlwaysOn, which offers 45 MB of data for P20, and the Facebook Mobile App, which allows subscribers to access Facebook via the mobile app on Java phones.

The brand also provides load services, such as Alkansya, which allows subscribers to save their load, and Pasaload, which enables them to share load with others.

TNT offers products tailored to meet consumer needs, with offerings designed to suit the lifestyles of its subscriber base. The brand provides mobile phones, the latest being the Panalo Phone 2, which comes packaged with a Talk 'N Text SIM. Individual SIMs are also available, capable of storing 450 phone numbers and 90 inbox text messages, and come with pre-loaded offers, pre-activated and ready to use when loading via prepaid card or outlet.

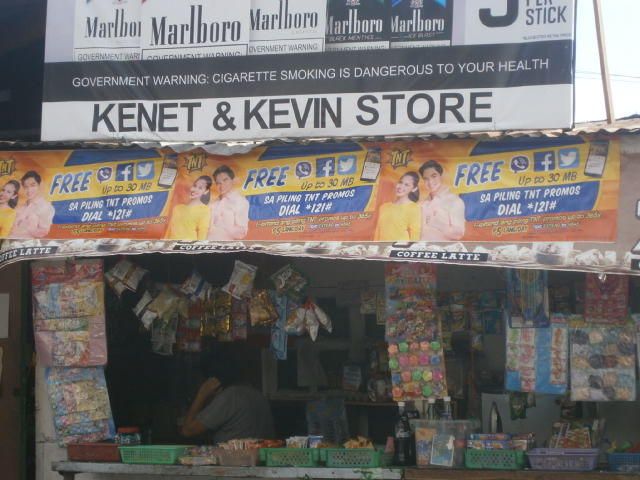
A TNT promo streamers featuring, the AlDub loveteam in a sari-sari store in Holy Spirit, Quezon City.

TNT has also introduced landline units called 'Barangay Phone,' which are essentially wireless handsets that can be used to text mobile phones and make calls anywhere in the Philippines. These units are specifically aimed at households where mobile phones may only be owned by one or two family members and have also been utilized as community phones in centers.

TNT sells ticket loads, which are among the most affordable load cards available. Priced at P10, they are designed to be highly accessible and can serve as emergency load. The rates include P10 valid for three days, P15 valid for 15 days, and P30 valid for 15 days.

== See also ==
- TNT Tropang Giga, a Philippine Basketball Association team sponsored by this company.
- TM, TNT's main competitor
