= Upstream PH =

Philippine over-the-top content platform

- Website type: OTT platform PPV
- Available in: English (Note: The website interface is only in English; however, available media is both in Filipino and English.)
- Dissolved: September 1, 2022; 4 years ago
- Headquarters: Makati, Philippines
- Area served: Worldwide
- Key people: Erik Matti; Dondon Monteverde
- Industry: Entertainment, sports
- Products: Streaming media; video on demand
- Parent: Kroma Entertainment (Globe Telecom Group)
- Website: upstream.ph
- Commercial: Yes
- Registration: Required
- Launched: November 14, 2020; 5 years ago
- Current status: Offline

Upstream PH (stylized as UPSTREAM.ph) was a Philippine over-the-top content platform. It was founded by Filipino filmmakers and Reality Entertainment co-owners Erik Matti and Dondon Monteverde.

The service provides movies, webseries, concerts and sporting events, including upcoming bouts of Filipino boxer Manny Pacquiao. It serves as a streaming platform for upcoming film releases and webseries from various film studios such as ABS-CBN Studios' Star Cinema, Regal Entertainment, Reality Entertainment, and Anima (formerly Globe Studios). Both Upstream and Anima are owned by Kroma Entertainment, which in turn, is backed by Globe Telecom.

== History ==
Upstream was launched in November 14, 2020, as a response to the tightened strict measures on the COVID-19 pandemic on the film industry in the Philippines.

In partnership with Globe Telecom, it became the official streaming provider of the 2020 Metro Manila Film Festival.

In May 2021, Upstream signed a video-on-demand (VOD) agreement with Comcast/NBCUniversal's Universal Pictures to carry the Hollywood film studio's library of movies, including upcoming theatrical releases.

On August 2022, it was announced that Upstream PH would intended to undergo maintenance of its website and mobile app effective September 1. However the service was quietly dissolved without any official statements from their parent company.

== Release ==
=== Films ===
Title	Genre	Premiere	Production
Midnight in a Perfect World	Horror	January 29, 2021	Globe Studios; Epic Media
Mommy Issues	Family comedy	May 7, 2021	Regal Multimedia
A Girl and A Guy	Coming-of-age, Erotic	June 24, 2021	Reality Entertainment, Globe Studios
Lockdown	Erotic, Gay film	July 23, 2021	For the Love of Art Films
Runaway	Romance drama, Adventure	September 3, 2021	Reality Entertainment

=== Web series ===
Title	Genre	Premiere	Production	Seasons
Ben X Jim	Romantic drama, Boys' love	February 12, 2021	Regal Entertainment	1 season (2nd season only)
Quaranthings	Rom-com, Boys' love	November 26, 2021	Ride or Die Productions	1 season (2nd season only)
