= TM (cellular service) =

Mobile virtual network operator in the Philippines

- Industry: Communications services
- Founded: September 12, 2001; 24 years ago (as Touch Mobile)
- Headquarters: Manila, Philippines
- Products: Telecommunications company; Mobile internet
- Owner: Globe Telecom
- Website: https://www.tmtambayan.ph/

TM (formerly known as Islacom, Touch Mobile, and Republika ng TM and also known as TM Tambayan) is a Filipino cellular service brand of Filipino telecommunications company Globe Telecom.

== History ==
TM was launched on September 12, 2001, as Touch Mobile, initially catering to the middle income market, and has since covered lower-income groups as well, making it Globe's value brand offering. The service has gained popularity for its discounted call and messaging services, with the "All Network" offers allowing TM subscribers to communicate with users from other local networks.

Touch Mobile was started as the first mobile brand in the Philippines that introduced voice messaging system in 2001. Due to the majority of SMS users, the voice messaging system was discontinued and instead focused on SMS-based services.

Logo used from 2009 to 2019.

== Rebranding ==
In 2005, the brand was relaunched as TM "Ang Bagong Touch Mobile" (English: The new Touch Mobile), and then as TM "Pinalakas na Touch Mobile" (English: The stronger Touch Mobile) while keeping the slogan "Power to the People!", reaching even subscribers of low income and rural communities.

Its new name Republika ng TM (Filipino: Republic of TM) and adding three stars and the sun above the logo, and their slogan "Astig Tayo Dito!" (Filipino: We are cool here!) was introduced in 2009.

In 2019, "Republika ng TM" was rebranded as "TM Tambayan " with an updated logo heavily based on the colors on the flag of the Philippines, which the brand focused on continuous of fun and happy Filipino (also known as "FunPinoy") moments.

== See also ==
- TNT
