= Personal communications network =

European mobile telephone network standard

Personal communications network (PCN) is the European digital cellular mobile telephone network. The underlying standard is known as Digital Cellular System, which defines a variant of GSM operating at 1.7–1.88 GHz. GSM-1800 has since been adopted by other locations, not necessarily under the PCN/DCS name. The network structure, the signal structure and the transmission characteristics are similar between PCN and GSM-900.

The PCN system was first initiated by Lord Young, UK Secretary of State for Trade and Industry, in 1988. The main characteristics of PCN are as follows:

1. Operating frequency – 1.7–1.88 GHz (1710–1785 MHz and 1805–1880 MHz).
2. Uses 30 GHz or up for microwave back bone system.
3. Covers both small cells and large cells.
4. Coverage inside and outside buildings.
5. Hand over.
6. Cell delivery.
7. Portable hand set.
8. User intelligent network.

The UK government's Department for Enterprise produced 'Phones on the Move: Personal Communications in the 1990s - a discussion document' in January 1989. The document presented a vision for how mobile communications might develop which outlined ideas for both the PCNs and the CT2 standards.

PCN is comparable to the North American Personal Communications Service band allocation. The 1800 MHz DCS band is reused in UMTS, LTE and 5G NR; it sees real-world deployment in LTE as "band 3".
