= Alipay =

Chinese mobile payment service

- Native name: 支付宝
- Romanized name: Zhīfùbǎo
- Industry: Financial services Payment processor
- Founded: February 2004; 22 years ago in Hangzhou, Zhejiang, China
- Founder: Jack Ma
- Headquarters: Pudong, Shanghai, China
- Area served: Worldwide
- Products: Electronic payment processing Banking; Mobile payment
- Parent: Ant Financial
- Website: www.alipay.com

Alipay
- Traditional Chinese: 支付寶
- Simplified Chinese: 支付宝
Transcriptions
Standard Mandarin
- Hanyu Pinyin: Zhīfùbǎo

Alipay (simplified Chinese: 支付宝; traditional Chinese: 支付寶; pinyin: zhīfùbǎo) is a third-party mobile and online payment platform, established in Hangzhou, China, in February 2004 by Alibaba Group and its founder Jack Ma. In 2015, Alipay moved its headquarters to Pudong, Shanghai, although its parent company Ant Financial remains Hangzhou-based.

Alipay overtook PayPal as the world's largest mobile (digital) payment platform in 2013. As of June 2020, Alipay serves over 1.3 billion users and 80 million merchants. According to the statistics of the fourth quarter of 2018, Alipay has a 55.32% share of the third-party payment market in mainland China, and it continues to grow.

Along with WeChat, Alipay has been described to be China's super-app with a wide range of functionalities including ridesharing, travel booking and medical appointments.

== History ==
The service was first launched in 2003, by Taobao. The People's Bank of China, China's central bank, issued licensing regulations in June 2010 for third-party payment providers. It also issued separate guidelines for foreign-funded payment institutions. Because of this, Alipay, which accounted for half of China's non-bank online payment market, was restructured as a domestic company controlled by Alibaba CEO Jack Ma in order to facilitate the regulatory approval for the license. The 2010 transfer of Alipay's ownership was controversial, with media reports in 2011 that Yahoo! and Softbank (Alibaba Group's controlling shareholders) were not informed of the sale for nominal value. Chinese business publication Century Weekly criticised Ma, who stated that Alibaba Group's board of directors was aware of the transaction. The incident was criticised in foreign and Chinese media as harming foreign trust in making Chinese investments. The ownership dispute was resolved by Alibaba Group, Yahoo!, and Softbank in July 2011. On July 29, 2011, Alibaba, Yahoo!, SoftBank and Alipay agreed on a certain structured framework for an agreement that left Alipay under separate ownership while preserving its payment-processing relationship with Alibaba. It was decided that Alipay would pay Alibaba royalties and technology-service fees of 49.9% before any liquidity event took place. Alibaba also received rights to 37.5% of Alipay's value in an IPO or similar event which was capped at US $6 billion and subject to a US $2 billion minimum. The arrangement also required Alibaba to provide technical and intellectual-property assistance to Alipay and its subsidiaries.

In 2013, Alipay launched a financial product platform called Yu'e Bao. Alipay partnered with Tianhong Asset Management to launch the it. Yu'e Bao offers an online money market account in which Alipay customers can deposit money and receive a higher interest rate than that available from banks. It soon became China's largest online money market fund and prompted competitors like Baidu and Tencent to introduce alternatives. Alibaba (the parent company of Alipay) reported having 152 million Yu'e Bao users in mid-2016, with 810 billion RMB (US$117 billion) in funds under management.

In 2015, Alipay's parent company was re-branded as Ant Financial Services Group.

In 2017, Alipay unveiled their facial recognition payment service.

In 2020, Alipay upgraded from a payment financial instrument to an open platform for digital life.

In 2021, the mandate by the Ministry of Industry and Information Technology (MIIT) to open up the "walled garden" ecosystems of the major tech companies has led to the introduction of interoperability of payment QR codes of Alipay and competing WeChat Pay and UnionPay's Cloud QuickPass platforms.

In response to the increase in Alipay's payment volume due to use on Alibaba's e-commerce sites and others, Chinese regulators introduced new rules in 2020. The new rules focused on Alipay because the payment volume exploded due to its use on Alibaba's e-commerce sites and other platforms. By the second quarter in 2020, Alipay held 55.6% of China's third party mobile payment market. The People's Bank of China made rules that required payment firms to place money with regulators and anti-monopoly reviews would be triggered if the amount exceeded 50% market share.The rules included that the People's Bank of China mandate an online-payment clearing route through the NetsUnion Clearing Corporation, a centralized, state-overseen clearing body, and that unused consumer funds be held by a third-party payment provider in a non-interest-bearing account. These measures increased transparency and reduced systemic risk.

When Alipay operates outside of China, it must comply with local financial regulations, which may treat specific functions such as money-market funds or investment-linked products. In Singapore, such services may require prior authorization from securities or financial-services regulators before they can be offered to residents.

== Services ==
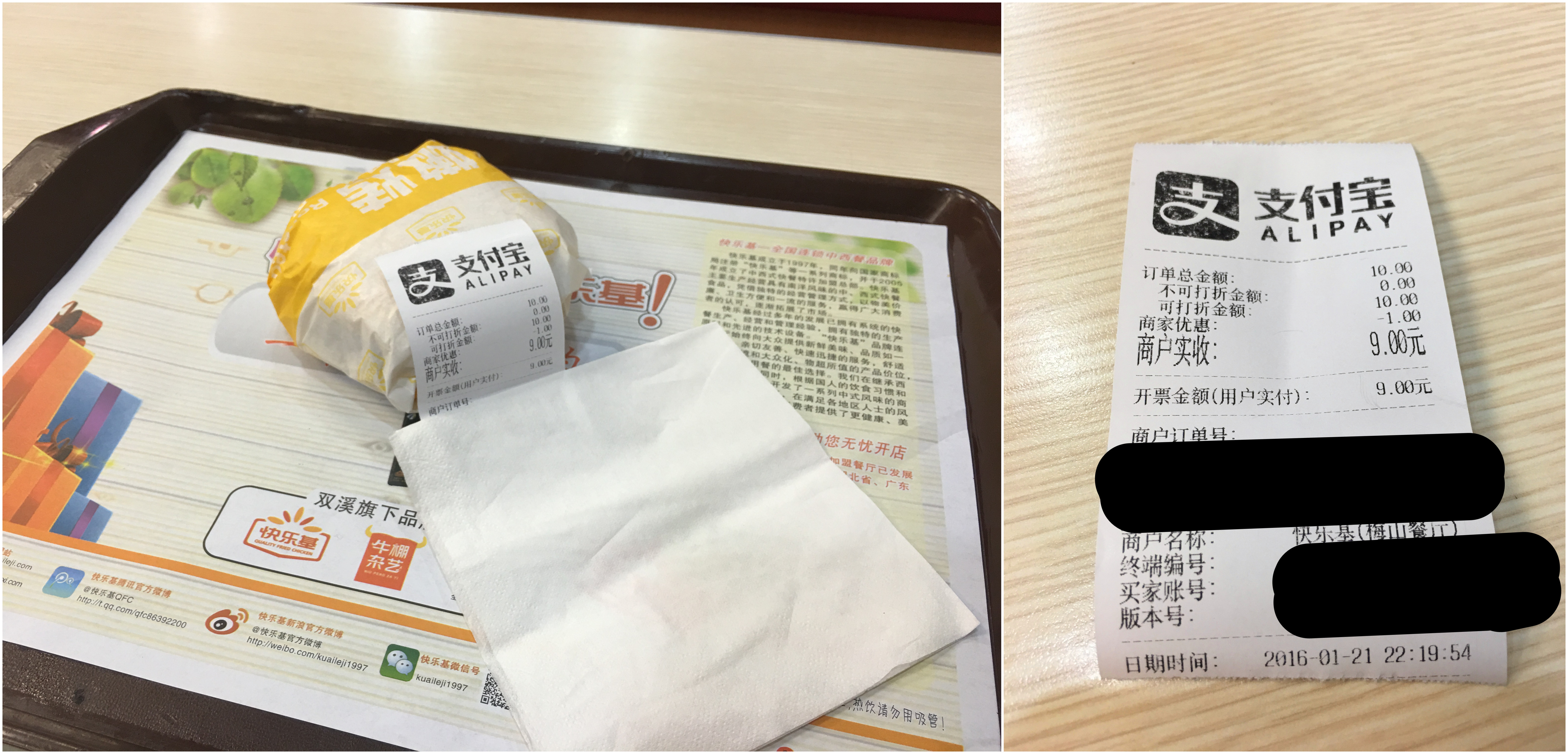
Food ordering with Alipay in mainland China

Alipay states that it operates with more than 65 financial institutions including Visa and MasterCard to provide payment services for Taobao and Tmall as well as more than 460,000 online and local Chinese businesses.

Alipay is used in smartphones with their Alipay Wallet app. QR code payment codes are used for local in-store payments. The Alipay app also provides features such as credit card bill payments, bank account managements, P2P transfer, prepay mobile phone top-up, bus and train ticket purchases, food orders, vehicles for hire, insurance selections and a digital identification document storage. Alipay also allows online check-out on most Chinese-based websites such as Taobao and Tmall.

The Alipay app allows users to add their own services provided from different companies to create a more personalised experience.

Since late 2008, Alipay has promoted public service payment services and has covered more than 300 cities nationwide, supporting more than 1,200 partner organizations. In addition to utility bills such as water and electricity, Alipay also extends their services to areas such as paying transportation fines, property fees, and cable television fees. Common online payment services also include hydropower coal payment, tuition payment and traffic fine.

On 15 January 2009, Alipay launched a credit card repayment service, supporting 39 domestic bank-issued credit cards. It is currently the most popular third-party repayment platform. The main advantages are free credit card bills checking, repayments with no administrative fee, as well as automatic repayment, repayment reminders and other value-added services. In the first quarter of 2014, 76% of credit cards were also paid by Alipay Wallet.

From December 2013, several chain convenience store companies, including Meiyijia, Hongqi Chain, and Qishiduo C-STORE and 7-Eleven, have successively supported Alipay payment; in December, Beijing taxi drivers began to accept Alipay to pay the fare. Subsequently, Wanda Cinema, Joy City, Wangfujing and other large-scale retail companies as well as movie theaters, KTV, and catering companies have access to Alipay. From 26 March 2019, the service fee will be charged for the payment of credit card through Alipay. Customers only pay the portion of the payment that exceeds 2,000 yuan at 0.1%. In addition to this, in 2019, Walgreens accepted Alipay as payment in 3,000 US stores. Walgreen's products are available to Chinese customers through Alibaba's Tmall online marketplace. The payment application can also be used on Alibaba.com's site and Taobao as a means of payment. A Nielsen report suggests that over 90% of Chinese tourists would be willing to use mobile payment overseas if given the option. Many Chinese tourists do not have international credit cards, and so Alipay is a payment option. Digital payments have become the norm in China as the government pushes a cashless system even in rural and village areas.

In November 2019, Alipay introduced Tourpass, a service component that allows non-Chinese users to use its mobile payment feature by pre-loading Chinese Yuan equivalent foreign currency into the app.

In 2020, Alipay used a QR code system to help in containing the COVID-19 outbreak. The health code system tags users one of three colors according to their location, basic health information and travel history.

"Beauty filters" were included to Alipay's face-scan payment system in a new upgrade that was released in July 2019. The market has responded well to the "beauty filters," which make users seem better when they use the program to make payments. Alipay Tap is a payment function launched by Alipay in July 2024. Alipay+ NFC enables wallets to offer tap-to-pay acceptance across Mastercard's global contactless network, all within your existing wallet infrastructure.

== Foreign expansion ==
Outside of China, more than 300 worldwide merchants use Alipay to sell directly to consumers in China. It currently supports transactions in 18 foreign currencies.

Since the launch of Alipay in the Mainland China, Ant Financial introduced a series of expansion of the services to other countries. Other than expanding into individual countries, the system would also be integrated with online payment platform providers. Ant Group had acquired a majority stake into 2C2P, a Singapore-based provider used by merchants worldwide in April 2022, and would eventually integrate Alipay with 2C2P.

=== Asia ===
==== Bangladesh ====
In 2018, Alipay bought 20% shares in Bangladeshi mobile financial service provider bKash Limited.

==== Hong Kong ====
In 2017, Ant Financial expanded to Hong Kong. In a joint venture with CK Hutchison, as Alipay Payment Services (HK), it launched the "AlipayHK" brand. A standalone app provides features such as mobile payments and P2P transfers. All transactions are made and settled in local Hong Kong dollars. The service then became available in major chain stores including McDonald's, 7-Eleven and Circle K. Wet markets and other merchants were also supported. From 2020 and 2021, with AlipayHK passing two million users, the service became accepted on MTR, buses and ferries.

==== Japan ====
Alipay entered Japan in 2015, with network up to 38,000 vendors. Ant Financial hopes that their network in Japan could help Chinese tourists that are heading to Japan.

==== Philippines ====
Alipay was introduced to the Philippines in 2018 by Asia United Bank (AUB). AUB also introduced WeChat Pay, and intends to use both payment systems to cater to Chinese tourists visiting the country.

Ant Financial also has invested on Mynt, the operator of the mobile service GCash which caters to the Philippine market. It helped convert GCash into a cashless mobile payment service similar to Alipay.

==== Singapore ====
In 2017, Ant Financial partnered with CC Financial, a start-up company in Singapore. Alipay plans to expand its 20,000 acceptance points in Singapore, and open up their platform to Singapore banking users.

==== South Korea ====
Alipay was introduced in South Korea in 2015, and is now available at various merchants around the country. Users can even receive an instant tax refund at four major airports in the country. In 2019, taxis in Seoul and Starbucks will accept Alipay via Kakaopay.

==== Vietnam ====
Alipay entered Vietnam in 2010, Ant Financial indicated that their network in Vietnam could assist Chinese tourists visiting the country. Currently in Vietnam, Davitrans, a proxy shipping service, is the only website in the country that accepts Alipay as one of its payment methods.

=== Oceania ===
==== Australia ====
In February 2019, Alipay and Tourism Australia announced a service to promote Australian destinations to Chinese tourists using the city of Sydney as a 12-month pilot project. The new Sydney City Card will introduce an interactive city map in the Alipay app to alert tourists to participating locations and retailers that welcome Alipay payments. A similar initiative will be trialed concurrently in Queenstown, New Zealand.

=== North America ===
==== United States ====
Ant Financial has partnered with First Data in 2017. It allows Alipay service to be used at point-of-sale with more than four million retail partners in the United States.

==== Canada ====
In 2017, Alipay partnered with SnapPay to allow Canadian retailers to accept Chinese currency from Chinese shoppers. As of 2019, there are 800 merchants in Canada that supports Alipay, including most Cadillac Fairview mall locations in partnership with OTT Pay, such as the flagship Eaton Centre of Toronto and CF Chinook Centre in Calgary. Air Canada began allowing transactions in Alipay to book flights from Canada and the United States beginning in August 2018, after initially rolling out the feature for booking of flights originating from China.

=== South America ===
==== Brazil ====
In July 2021, Alipay was introduced in Brazil as a digital wallet for transactions on AliExpress. With this feature, customers could store balance in their account, collect bonuses and use it as a form of payment for purchases made on the marketplace, but the Alipay Brazil Digital Consumer Account was discontinued on 30 September 2022.

=== Europe ===
==== France ====
Alipay partners with Silkpay to enable merchants in France and other European countries to accept Alipay payments online and in-store.

==== Iceland ====
Alipay has partnered with Splitit and Epassi in Iceland.

==== Italy ====
Alipay partnered with UniCredit, SIA and Banca Sella Group to enable app payments in physical and online stores in Italy.

==== Norway ====
Alipay has started cooperating with Vipps in Norway. 30 shops in Bergen are ready to receive Alipay-customers, and in January 2019 some shops in Oslo will be ready.

==== Russia ====
Alipay proposed a partnership with Sberbank to provide immediate money transfers by cellphone number between Russia and China by 2022: the proposal pre-dates the Russian invasion of Ukraine in 2022, which resulted in Visa and Mastercard suspending operations in Russia.

==== United Kingdom ====
Alipay partnered with Barclaycard in the United Kingdom, bringing Alipay to UK retailers.

== Comparison with other payment systems ==
Alipay is conceptually similar to Apple Pay, WeChat Pay and PayPal because it overlays traditional card payment methods. Although users receive immediate notification of the transaction, the main difference among Alipay and an instant payment system, like Venmo or Zelle is that the funds transfer between counterparties is not immediate. The settlement time depends on the payment method chosen by the customer, while for instant payment systems, the funds are transferred within seconds or minutes.

At the time it was implemented and integrated into Taobao, the mandatory escrow feature of Alipay was a major institutional innovation for e-commerce platforms. This was a major reason Taobao was able to outcompete eBay/EachNet in the Chinese market.

== Regulatory history ==
Prior to Alipay, third-party payment was a legal grey area in China. In an effort to build trust with regulators, Alibaba informed regulators about the development of Alipay from the outset and provided regulators with monthly updates on its development. Alipay's development has been largely guided by regulatory policies including frequent disclosure. Instead of launching payments in secret, Alibaba chose to keep regulators informed and up to date on progress which helped to reduce uncertainty around a quick growing payment platform. This approach made difference because Alipay was growing and soon becoming something that can be used as a checkout tool. It was evolving into a major financial infrastructure layer that that was used for settlements. One of the questions that arose in regards to Alipay was whether it was a bank or not because it had a giant pool of investments. As Alipay's popularity increased, it became accepted by Chinese regulators. In 2010, the People's Bank of China (PBoC) issued administrative measures regarding non-financial payment services. These measures retroactively recognized the legal status of online third-party payment platforms like Alipay. In 2011, Alipay obtained a license to become one of the first licensed non-financial institutions to conduct payment operations.

The PBoC supported the growth of Yu'e Bao and similar funds with a permissive regulatory environment initially but began increasing regulation of such funds in 2017.

In September 2021, the Chinese government stated its intent to dismantle the Alipay super app into separate businesses due to concerns over "systemic financial risks" as Chinese e-commerce and fintech firms had begun to amass huge troves of user data for their operations. The move essentially split Ant Group's consumer lending businesses, credit card-like Huabei and micro-loan provider Jiebei, from Alipay's financial offerings.

In November 2021, Alipay introduced a new privacy protection feature amid growing concerns over data privacy and after China's Personal Information Protection Law (PIPL) came into effect on 1 November 2021. The PIPL prohibits the unnecessary collection of personal information, abuse of personal privacy, and data exchanges with overseas entities. Alipay's new feature allows users to track how the app collects data about them and is an interactive equivalent to a privacy policy, which explains how an app collects, stores, and shares user data.

Alipay was banned in India (along with other Chinese apps) on 2 September 2020 by the government amid the 2020 China-India skirmish.

== See also ==
- Alipay Health Code
