= Ant Group =

Chinese financial services company

Ant Group Co. Ltd.
- Native name: 蚂蚁科技集团股份有限公司
- Industry: Technology; Financial services; Payment processor
- Predecessor: Alipay financial services (2014); Ant Financial Services Group (2014–2020)
- Founded: 16 October 2014; 12 years ago in Hangzhou, Zhejiang, China
- Founder: Jack Ma
- Headquarters: Xihu District, Hangzhou, China
- Area served: Worldwide
- Key people: Eric Jing Chairman; Cyril Han Chief Executive Officer; Zhengyu He; Chief Technology Officer
- Products: Electronic payment processing; Banking; Mobile payment
- Brands: Alipay; Yu'ebao; Huabei; Xianghubao
- Revenue: 120,618,000,000 renminbi (2019)
- Operating income: 24,071,000,000 renminbi (2019)
- Net income: 18,072,000,000 renminbi (2019)
- Total assets: 271,558,000,000 renminbi (2019)
- Owner: Hangzhou Alibaba Network Technology (32.65%); Hangzhou Junhan Investment (29.86%); Hangzhou Jun'ao Investment (20.66%)
- Number of employees: ~16,660
- Subsidiaries: Tianhong Asset Management
- Website: www.antgroup.com

Ant Group (Chinese: 蚂蚁集团; pinyin: Mǎyǐ jítuán), formerly known as Ant Financial, is an affiliate company of the Chinese conglomerate Alibaba Group. Ant Group was initially the financial transaction arm of Alibaba, Alipay, when it was set up in 2004.

Alibaba's e-commerce sites faced the problem of not having a payment system to process payments for their online sites. With Alipay, customers on Alibaba's e-commerce sites, Tmall, Taobao, and Alibaba's B2B site could make payments through their Alipay, and the amount was withheld until delivery was made. The amount of online traffic made Alipay profitable despite its low transaction fee because of the number of users, which currently numbers at more than a billion. It operates Alipay, a major mobile payment platform in China, reported to have over 1.3 billion users as of 2020. As of 2024, it is the sixth largest fintech company in the world. In March 2019, The Wall Street Journal reported Ant's flagship Tianhong Yu'e Bao money-market fund was the largest in the world, with over 588 million users.

In October 2020, Ant Group planned to raise US$34.5 billion in what would have been one of the largest IPO in history, valuing the company at US$313 billion. However, Chinese regulators suspended the listing shortly before it was to occur. On 12 April 2021, The Wall Street Journal reported that under the pressure from the Chinese government, Ant Group would be transformed into a financial holding company overseen by the People's Bank of China.

== History ==
=== Founding and expansion (2014–2020) ===
Alipay was rebranded as Ant Group Services on 23 October 2014, and the company changed its name to Ant Group Co., Ltd on 13 July 2020. In 2015, Ant Group raised $4.5 billion in a funding round with investors including China Investment Corp (CIC), CCB Trust, China Life, China Post Group, China Development Bank Capital and Primavera Capital Group. In 2015, the company was valued at about $45 billion. As of 26 April 2016, Ant Group had around 450 million annual active users. In September 2016, Ant Group bought EyeVerify Inc. and rebranded it Zoloz.

By late January 2017, Ant Group had a valuation of $60 billion. On 26 January 2017, Ant Group Services Group announced a deal to acquire MoneyGram International for $880 million, but terminate the deal after approval was not granted from the Committee on Foreign Investment in the United States due to US national security concerns. The same month, the Cyberspace Administration of China stated Ant Group had failed to meet personal data protection standards.

In September 2017, Ant Group formed a joint venture with Li Ka-shing's CK Hutchison Holdings to launch a digital wallet service in Hong Kong. In June 2018, the company launched a blockchain-powered cash remittance service that will allow real-time cash transfers between Hong Kong and Philippines.

On 9 June 2018, the company raised around US$14 billion. In November 2019, the company announced to be raising $1 billion for a new fund, with the aim to expand the firm's investment activities in India and Southeast Asia. In January 2020, Ant Group applied for a digital banking license in Singapore.

=== Attempted initial public offering (2020) ===
In 2020, Ant Group intended to complete an initial public offering, aiming to raise $34 billion by listing. This would have been the largest such offering by any company to date, above the $29.4 billion raised by Saudi Aramco as a result of its 2019 offering.

Due to Ant Group's scale—the company has approximately one billion users in China, and in 2017 it processed more payments than Mastercard—and its operations, which include lending services, the company has attracted regulatory scrutiny in the past. The China Securities Regulatory Commission previously imposed new restrictions on money-market funds, a move attributed to the size and growth of Yu'e Bao, an Ant offering. Though the company asserts it does not function as a bank or a financial institution, Chinese banks have voiced their belief that Ant draws deposits away from them, so undermining the banking system. The People's Bank of China requested data from banks that lent through Ant in mid-2020 and the State Administration for Market Regulation informally began an investigation earlier in the year into whether Alipay and WeChat Pay, a Tencent subsidiary, had abused their size to hamper competitors.

Prior to the IPO in October 2020, the company's founder and controlling shareholder Ma criticized regulators for their focus on risk mitigation. Soon after the comments were made, Ma and other senior Ant executives were summoned to a meeting with the China Securities Regulatory Commission, the China Banking and Insurance Regulatory Commission, and the State Administration of Foreign Exchange as well as representatives from the country's central bank, the People's Bank of China. Ant Group issued a statement disclosing that the Ant and government representatives discussed "Views regarding the health and stability of the financial sector".

Forbes reported that certain analysts viewed the suspension as justified, citing concerns about systemic financial risks.

After the meeting, and two days before the IPO was set to occur, the offering was suspended by the Shanghai Stock Exchange referenced it as a "major issues". The exchange further indicated that the company no longer conformed with listing requirements. Ant subsequently suspended the Hong Kong listing. The suspension was unexpected, surprising bankers working on the transaction, the broader financial industry, and consumers prepared to invest in the offering. It has been referred to as "abrupt" and "shocking". Ant began working to address regulator concerns in January 2021, though no public plans for an IPO have been announced as of September 2021.

Jack Ma retreated from the public eye after the IPO's suspension. Some speculated that Ma had left China altogether. He did not appear in public between October 2020 and January 2021. In January 2021, he spoke in a live-streamed video. In the video, he discussed his commitment to philanthropy and improving quality of life for those in rural China.

=== After suspension of IPO (2020–present) ===
On 4 December 2020, Ant Group's unit and a consortium comprising Greenland Financial Holdings Group, Linklogis Hong Kong Ltd, and Beijing Co-operative Equity Investment Fund Management, have been selected to receive the digital wholesale bank (DWB) licences in Singapore. Ant Group was later ordered by the People's Bank of China on 26 December 2020 to "rectify" its business and formulate an implementation timetable. The central bank also summoned Ant executives, saying that the Group lacked an effective governance mechanism, defied regulatory compliance requirements and engaged in regulatory arbitrage.

On 15 January 2021, Ant Group announced that it will overhaul its business structure in accordance with the Chinese central bank and its financial regulators' wishes. State spokesmen announced that the Ant Group's consumer finance branch will be regulated as a financial institution, in lieu of a technology startup.

In April 2021, Ant Group applied to become a financial holding company under the direction of the People's Bank of China. The move separated Ant Group's consumer lending businesses, credit card-like Huabei and micro-loan provider Jiebei, from Alipay's other financial offerings with effect from September 2021. This restructuring separated Ant Group's consumer lending businesses from Alipay's other financial offerings, affecting the integrated structure of the app.

In January 2022, Ant Group launched a new investment advisory service named "Golden Choice Investment Consultants" (金选投顾) in partnership with six financial institutions – Aegon-Industrial Fund, China Southern Asset Management, Zhong Ou Asset Management, GF Fund Management, Harvest Wealth, and Caitong Securities. The service was briefly available to all Alipay users before it was taken down less than ten days later as Ant Group does not hold a fund rating license that is required before an entity can assess and publicly share information about the investment prospects of financial instruments.

In April 2022, the company took over Singapore-based payments firm 2C2P to further digital payment adoption. In July 2022, Chinese authorities give a tentative green light to Ant Group to revive its initial public offering plans in both Shanghai and Hong Kong.

Ant Group made major changes to its ownership structure and corporate governance in January 2023. Same month, Ant Group announced a series of changes in shareholder voting rights, and Jack Ma was ousted from actual controller of Ant Group. Ma's voting rights were reduced from 50% to 6%. Following these changes, no single shareholder has a controlling stake in the company. The company's board also added another independent director. The Chinese government spoke positively of Ant Group's changes, including describing them as improvements in transparency and accountability.

In June 2023, Ant Group reported a record high investment of 21.19 billion yuan ($2.92 billion) in technology research and development, mainly focused on AI technology. The company, in its 2023 sustainability report, revealed that it had received government approval to release products powered by its "Bailing" AI large language model to the public. The model has been used in various AI assistants on its Alipay platform, including a "smart healthcare manager" and "smart financial manager."

In July 2023, Ant Group was fined 7.12 billion RMB ($985 million) by Chinese regulators for non-compliance with regulations in payments and financial services, specifically citing issues in corporate governance, consumer protection, and anti-money laundering practices. This fine reflects ongoing regulatory challenges faced by the firm in adapting to stringent domestic regulations.

In March 2024, Ant Group restructured its operations by establishing several divisions as independently run business units, including its overseas unit Ant International, database operation OceanBase, and Ant Digital Technologies, each with their own boards of directors. This reorganization allows each unit to pursue distinct growth strategies and operate with greater autonomy, potentially enabling them to navigate specific regulatory landscapes more effectively and pursue separate funding or public listing opportunities.

In June 2024, Alipay introduced a QR code-based contactless payment service called Alipay Tap!. The service allows users to complete transactions by tapping their unlocked phone against an NFC tag or terminal. By April 2025, the company reported that the service had more than 100 million users and was available in over 400 Chinese cities.

In September 2024, Ant Group introduced several AI-based services at the INCLUSION Conference on the Bund. These included an AI assistant app called Zhixiaobao and AI tools for merchants, insurance companies, and healthcare services.

In December 2024, Ant Group announced Cyril Han, previously its chief financial officer, would assume the role of incoming chief executive officer, effective 1 March 2025. Eric Jing, the incumbent CEO, was slated to remain as chairman, ensuring continuity in leadership.

In December 2024, Ant Group stated it had no immediate plans for an IPO. In January 2025, Ant Group announced its acquisition of Haodf.com to explore AI in healthcare. In March 2025, Ant Group released the Ling-Plus and Ling-Lite large language models and planned to leverage those models for industrial AI solutions including healthcare and finance. In April 2025, Ant Group agreed to purchase a $362 million controlling stake in Bright Smart Securities & Commodities Group, a Hong Kong-based brokerage firm. The deal will mark Ant Group's first acquisition of a securities brokerage license. In June 2025, the company launched the AQ healthcare app, which connects users to a network of hospitals and doctors. Ant Group reported the app reached 100 million users by July 2025. According to its 2024 Sustainability Report, Ant Group's research and development spending was RMB 23.45 billion, a 10.7% increase from the previous year, with a focus on AI applications.

== Expansion outside Asia ==
Ant Group has expanded its services internationally, citing the growth of Chinese outbound tourism. In Europe, the company had tripled the number of merchants that are accepting the Alipay app, according to the firm's head of Europe division. Partnerships exist between Alipay and various European digital wallet apps, including ePassi (Finland), Vipps (Norway), MOMO (Spain), Pagaqui (Portugal) and Bluecode (Austria).

On 14 February 2019, Ant Group acquired the British international money transfer services provider WorldFirst for $700 million.

In March 2019, UK's Barclaycard expanded an agreement that enabled British retailers to accept the Alipay app in their stores.

By September 2020, it was reported that US authorities were considering restrictions on Ant Group's payment system, with the U.S. State Department recommending that Ant Group be added to the Entity List, but subsequently withdrew plans to sanction the company.

== Ant International ==
Ant International
- Type: Private
- Industry: Financial technology
- Founded: 2023
- Headquarters: Singapore
- Key people: Peng Yang (CEO); Douglas Feagin (President); Leiming Chen (Chief Sustainability Officer)
- Revenue: 120,618,000,000 renminbi (2019)
- Operating income: 24,071,000,000 renminbi (2019)
- Net income: 18,072,000,000 renminbi (2019)
- Total assets: 271,558,000,000 renminbi (2019)
- Website: www.ant-intl.com

Ant International is a Singapore-based financial technology company that provides digital payment, digitization, and financial services across international markets, including Asia, Europe, the Middle East, and Latin America.

Ant International owns WorldFirst, which operates the World Pay payment service. World Pay is the official way for businesses outside of China to engage in e-commerce procurement on 1688.com.

=== History ===
Ant International was founded in 2023 as part of Ant Group’s initiative to expand its services beyond mainland China. It initially operated as the global business arm of Ant Group, focusing on digital payments and financial services in international markets.

In March 2024, Ant Group announced a restructuring of some of its operations into independently managed business units. As a result of this reorganization, Ant International became an independently operated company. Following its establishment, the company introduced several digital finance platforms and expanded its services globally.

In July 2026, Ant International raised US$1.2 billion in an equity funding round in which Ant Group and Alibaba Group participated. The company said the capital would support its global expansion in merchant payments, account management and other financial services for enterprises.

=== Subsidiaries ===
==== WorldFirst ====
WorldFirst was founded in 2004 in the United Kingdom with the aim of simplifying foreign-exchange processes for SMEs. Between 2007 and 2008, the company launched its online platform and expanded through e-commerce and corporate FX services.

WorldFirst began international expansion in 2009 with the opening of its first overseas office in Sydney, followed by additional offices in Hong Kong, Singapore, the Netherlands, Japan, and Korea between 2013 and 2016.

In 2019, WorldFirst became a part of Ant Group (formerly Ant Financial) and expanded its services across Asia and other emerging markets.

In 2024, Ant Group announced a reorganization of its operations, where WorldFirst moved into its international group.

In 2025, WorldFirst expanded into Thailand, and further secured a license from Bank Negara Malaysia to operate in Malaysia.

== Services ==
It operates Alipay, the world's largest mobile and online payments platform as well as Yu'e Bao, formerly the world's largest money-market fund. Ant Financial and Alibaba announced a joint venture called Koubei with each company investing RMB 3 billion ($483.3 million). Both held 50% equity stakes in Koubei, which focuses on shopping and dining services, and the venture consolidated Alibaba's restaurant delivery business and Ant Financial's offline merchant services which include bending machines and healthcare retailer tools. Alipay, Alibaba's mobile payment tool also benefited from the joint venture which consolidated offline and online markets in China and competed directly with Meituan Dianping, a company in China's local e-commerce sector that is expanding when it comes to food delivery and merchant services. It also runs Zhima Credit, a third-party credit rating system. As of September 2017, Ant Group unveiled its facial recognition payment technology through its Alipay services.

In September 2018, the company launched the Ant Group Technology brand for all of its technology products and services.

In 2015, Alibaba and Ant Group Services Group created online-to-offline local services company Koubei as a joint venture. Alibaba's affiliate Ant Financial Services Group announced a $1 billion investment in Koubei, a local services platform targeting China's online-to-offline (O2O) market. Each party committed 3 billion yuan to a 50–50 venture focused on food delivery to rival Tencent-backed services such as Ele.me. Koubei was previously part of Taobao and offers services such as mobile bookings for dining, rides, and more. This agreement signaled tough competition in the O2O sector for real-world services such as food delivery via smartphones.

In September 2025, Koubei underwent a major restructuring, including the relaunch of a Koubei website, coordinated with Amaps group-buying services. As a result, Alibaba shares rose 3.6% overnight. This restructuring is a major strategic move in the local lifestyle services sector and has led to tough competition with industry giants like Dianping. Ant Group also operates credit payment company Huabei, and owns a 30% stake in the online bank called MYbank.

In 2015, Ant Group launched Ant Fortune, a wealth management platform. Yu'e Bao is one of the products on the platform. Ant Fortune offers hundreds of products from more than 80 Chinese fund institutions.

In June 2017, Ant Fortune launched a Fortune Account (财富号) service platform that allows financial institutions to publish content and sell their financial products there.

In October 2018, Ant Group launched the Xianghubao mutual protection plan that attracted 50 million people to sign on in half a year. Xianghubao and other mutual-aid companies sought to crowd-fund medical coverage while avoiding being characterized as an insurance product. Following the 2020–2021 Xi Jinping administration reform spree, Xianghubao and many other mutual-aid companies shut down.

In September 2019, a product within the Alipay app called Ant Forest received a Champions of the Earth award, the United Nations' highest environmental honor, for turning the green activities of half a billion people into real trees planted in some of China's most arid regions. Users are encouraged to record their low-carbon footprint through daily actions, such as taking public transportation or paying utility bills online. For each move, they receive "green energy" points with which they can exchange for the real trees, which they can view in real time via satellite.

In 2021, Ant Group revealed at the Digital China Summit that it has been cooperating with the People's Bank of China since 2017 to develop and test e-CNY, an official digital currency. In 2023, the company invested 21.19 billion yuan ($2.92 billion) in technology research and development, focusing on AI-related services, including a 'smart healthcare manager' and 'smart financial manager' on its Alipay platform. In June 2021, Ant Group has been approved to operate the consumer finance company, Chongqing Ant Consumer Finance Co., Ltd. This new licensed entity was created to house Ant's major credit businesses; Huabei and Jiebei.

In 2023, Ant Group launched Golden Choice Investment Consultants, an investment advisory service in partnership with six financial institutions, enhancing its service offerings and leveraging its technological capabilities in financial advisory. In 2023, Ant Group's insurance platform, Ant Insurance, recorded a 23% year-on-year increase in payouts from its partner insurers.

In 2024, Ant Insurance reported that AI systems were used to process 7.25 million health insurance claims, a 55% year-on-year increase. In April 2025, Alipay Ant Forest, a green initiative by Ant Group, announced the planting of its 600 millionth tree.

== Structure ==
The Ant IPO prospectus shows a complex ownership structure with Hangzhou Junhan owning 29.86%, Hangzhou Junao owning 20.66%, and Alibaba itself holding 32.65%. Alibaba Group's annual report for the year ended 31 March 2026 disclosed that under the equity method Aliblaba had equity interest in Ant Group on a fully diluted basis of 33%. Meanwhile, another entity named Hangzhou Yunbo controls the top two stakeholders, Hangzhou Junhan and Hangzhou Junao, as their executive and general partner. Jack Ma was Yunbo's single largest stakeholder with 34%. Three other Ant officials, Chairman Eric Jing, CEO Simon Hu and non-executive director Jiang Fang, held equal stakes in the remainder of Yunbo, with 22% each.

On 7 January 2023, Ant Group announced that it was restructuring so that Jack Ma would no longer be the controlling person of the company. It added that Ma and nine of its other major shareholders would use their voting rights independently and no longer act in concert. It additionally added that there would be a new fifth independent director on its board; it previously had eight board directors, with four of them being independent. The changes meant that Ma's share voting rights would decrease from over 50% to 6.2%.

== Controversies ==
=== Connection with Megvii ===
In September 2020, former Google China president and venture capitalist Kai-Fu Lee said in a public speech that Sinovation Ventures had assisted Megvii, a Beijing-based company known for providing artificial intelligence products to various businesses, in obtaining a large amount of private facial data from Ant Group to "analyze how to enter various industries." Following Lee's speech, Ant Group denied providing Megvii facial data. Lee later said he "misspoke" on the issue.

=== Sharing consumer data with Chinese government ===
In January 2021, The Wall Street Journal reported that China's regulators were trying to make Ant share the troves of personal data in its payment and lifestyle app, Alipay, which is used by over a billion people. The data include consumers' spending habits, borrowing behaviors, and payment histories. According to people familiar with the issue, in the past, Jack Ma had resisted the authorities' attempts to grab the data owned by Ant. In late December 2020, China's central bank criticized Ant for its "defiance of regulatory demands" and asked the company to restructure its business.

=== Predatory lending ===
Critics have alleged that Ant Group's lending practices created moral hazard, as the company assumed only 2% of loan risk while partner institutions bore the remainder. Another issue was Ant's model for determining credit scores. Instead of depending on factors like the consumer's debt ratio or their income, the Ant Group relied on a counter-intuitive measure which based scores on the consumer's expenditure history where buying more actually led to a higher score for the borrower, and hence encourages more spending rather than reinforcing fiscal restraint.

=== Violating various regulations ===
On 7 July 2023, the Ant Group was fined ¥7.123 billion ($985 million) by regulators for non-compliance with regulations in payments and financial services. The People's Bank of China, which imposed the fine, accused Ant of breaching laws related to corporate governance, payment and settlement business, consumer protection, and anti-money laundering obligations.

== Related entities ==
=== Subsidiaries ===
- Alipay – a mobile wallet app supports make and accept payments.
- Huabei (Ant Credit Pay) – a virtual credit card type of product that facilitates credit payments.
- MYbank – a private cloud-based online bank that is also one of six state-banked financial institutions to operate the digital yuan in China. Ant Group owns a 30% stake in the subsidiary bank.
- Jiebei (Ant Cash Now) – a consumer loan service.
- Ant Fortune – a comprehensive wealth management app.
- Ant Insurance Services
- Zhima Credit – an independent credit filling and scoring service for individuals.
- ZOLOZ – a global biometric-based identity verification platform.
- A global foreign exchange platform for individuals and international businesses.
- In 2024, Ant International was spun off from Ant Group. The company has set up an independent board and is headquartered in Singapore. It offers a range of financial products, including global electronic wallet service Alipay+, merchant payment platform Antom, cross-border business account service WorldFirst, and embedded finance service Bettr.
- Shuzi Mali (Digital Horsepower Information Technology) – a software-as-a-service (SaaS) business that provides technology consultancy and software services.
- Sa Si Digital Technology – a SaaS that focuses on software development, technology transfer, and server integration for financial enterprises.
- Ant International – a Singapore-based financial technology company that provides digital payment, digitization, and financial services

=== International partners ===
- 2C2P (Singapore)
- Ascend Group (Thailand)
- bKash (Bangladesh)
- CK Hutchison Holdings (Hong Kong, SAR)
- Easypaisa (Pakistan)
- Emtek (Indonesia)
- Eternal Limited (India)
- GCash Inc. (Philippines)
- National Payment Corporation (NAPAS) (Vietnam)
- KakaoPay (South Korea)
- Touch 'n Go eWallet (Malaysia)
- Vodacom (South Africa)

=== Ecosystem ===
Ant Group operates services across payments, insurance, lending, and wealth management through platforms including Alipay and MYbank. The ecosystem supporting a wide range of activities from daily transactions to more complex financial needs, facilitating global payments, food delivery, and access to microloans.
