= LKG =

LKG may refer to:

- LKG (film), a 2019 Indian film
- LKG Tower, an office skyscraper in Makati, Philippines
- Lokichogio Airport in Kenya (IATA airport code: LKG)
- LKG, an initialism for Lower kindergarten
