= Smart Tower =

Coordinates: 14.5590575°N 121.0164712°E

- The Smart Tower in 2022 as seen from Ayala Avenue.
- Interactive map of the Smart Tower area

General information
- Status: Completed
- Type: Office
- Architectural style: Modernism
- Location: 6799 Ayala Avenue, Makati, Philippines
- Owner: PLDT (until 2020); DMC Urban Property Developers Inc. (2020–present)

Height
- Antenna spire: 134.64 m (441.7 ft)

Technical details
- Floor count: 36
- Floor area: 38,000 ^m2

Design and construction
- Architects: Pimentel Rodriguez Simbulan & Partners

Smart Tower (previously PLDT Tower) is a 36-storey skyscraper at 6799 Ayala Avenue, Makati, Philippines.

The building was originally an unfinished 10-storey structure which was bought and developed by the Philippine Long Distance Telephone Company (PLDT) for its corporate headquarters. Completed in 2009 and designed by Pimentel Rodriguez Simbulan & Partners, the new 34-storey tower was originally known as the PLDT Tower. It was renamed Smart Tower following the transfer of Smart Communications, one of PLDT's subsidiaries, to the site, becoming their headquarters.

In 2020, PLDT sold the building to DMC Urban Property Developers Inc. of the Consunji family for $128 million.
