= ZTE Blade V880 =

Smartphone manufactured by ZTE Corporation

ZTE Blade
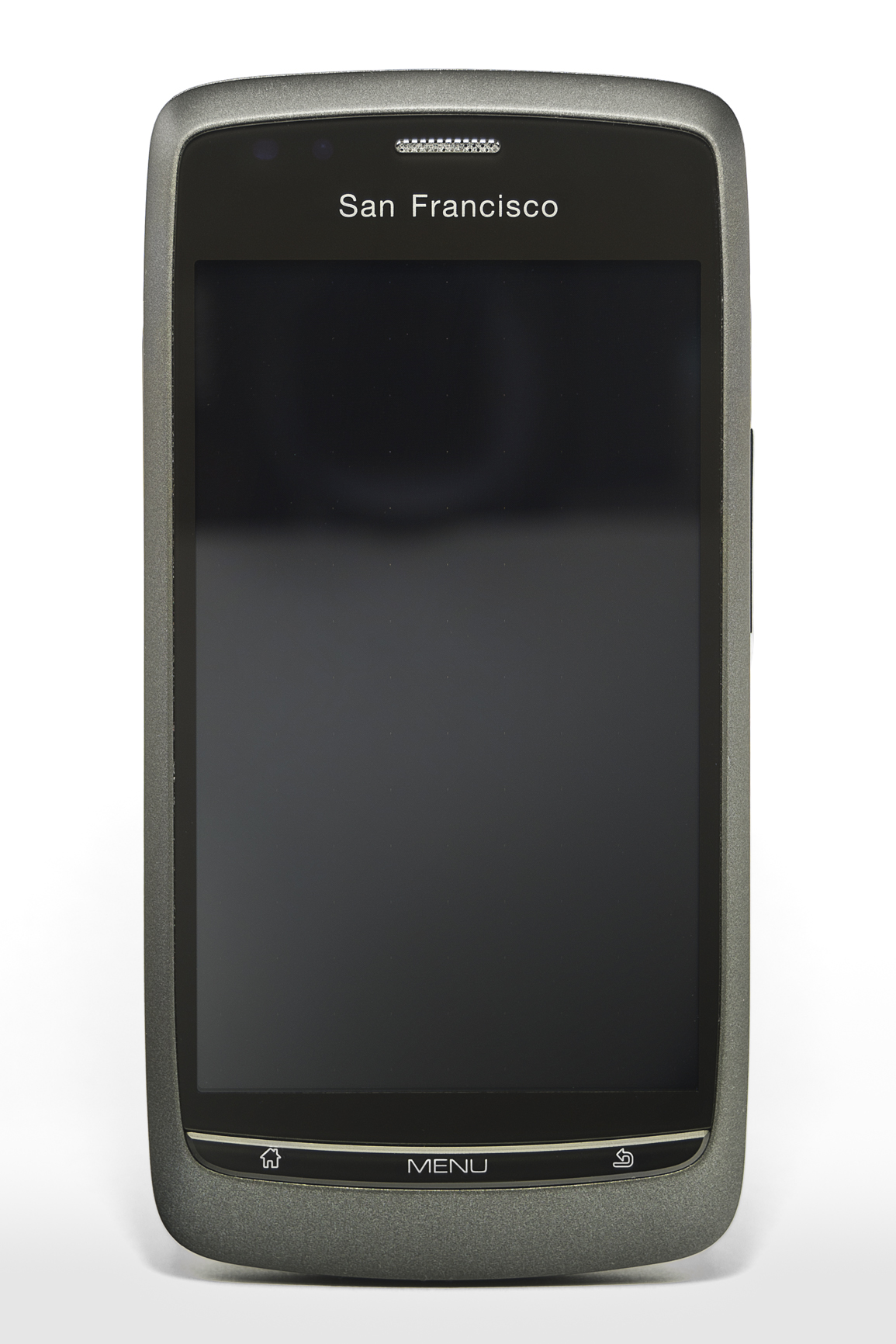
- Manufacturer: ZTE
- Type: Slate smartphone
- Series: Blade
- First released: 21 September 2010
- Dimensions: 116 mm (4.6 in) H 56.5 mm (2.22 in) W 11.8 mm (0.46 in) D
- Weight: 130 g (4.6 oz)
- Operating system: Android 2.1 Éclair or 2.2 Froyo
- CPU: Qualcomm MSM7227 600 MHz (ARMv6 architecture)
- GPU: Adreno 200
- Memory: 512 MB or 256 MB RAM
- Storage: 512 MB NAND
- Removable storage: microSD slot v2.0 compatible (supports up to 32 GB); 2 GB card included
- Battery: 1250 mAh; Internal rechargeable lithium-ion battery, 4 hours talk time and 216 hours (9 days) stand-by time
- Rear camera: 3.2 or 5.0 megapixel with auto focus
- Display: 480×800 px, 3.5 in (89 mm), 267 PPI, WVGA, OLED or TFT LCD capacitive touchscreen
- Connectivity: Wi-Fi (802.11 b/g), Bluetooth 2.1+EDR, GSM 850 900 1800 1900 MHz HSPA/WCDMA 900 2100 MHz
- Data inputs: Multi-touch capacitive touchscreen display, 3-axis accelerometer, digital compass, proximity and ambient light sensors
- Model: V880
- Other: Proximity sensor, Ambient Light sensor, Accelerometer, FM Radio, Compass, GPS, A-GPS, LED Notification.

The ZTE Blade V880 (also known as ZTE Lutea) is a smartphone manufactured by ZTE Corporation for the Android platform. Unveiled by Orange UK as San Francisco, it went on sale on 21 September 2010, with a white variant released later. By 2011, more than 8 million Blade handsets had been sold in more than 50 countries worldwide.

The ZTE Blade II V880+ was released in March 2012 with Qualcomm Snapdragon MSM7227A 1 GHz processor and Android 2.3 Gingerbread.

The Blade III was released in September 2012 with a 4.0 inch screen, 4 GB storage, a 1600 mAh Li-ion battery and Android 4.0 Ice Cream Sandwich.

The Blade brand has since been applied to successor models such as Blade C and Blade L.

== Variants ==
In some countries, the ZTE Blade was available in customized versions with different cameras and touchscreen displays and often bears a different brand name:

- Belarus: velcom offered ZTE Blade unlocked with TFT display, 3.2 MPX camera and 512 MB (256 MB before October 2011) RAM. It runs Android 2.3 Gingerbread.
- Belgium: Mobistar offered the ZTE Blade unlocked with a 3.2-megapixel camera, 512 MB RAM, and TFT capacitive touchscreen display under the name San Francisco with no brand or manufacturer.
- Bulgaria: Globul offered a branded Globul Z3 phone with Android 2.2 and a 3.2 MP camera.
- China (mainland): China Unicom offered the ZTE Blade with 512 MB ROM and 256 MB RAM and a 3.2-megapixel camera called ZTE V880 (GSM and WCDMA). China Mobile offered the ZTE Blade with 512 MB ROM and 512 MB RAM and 5.0 MP camera called ZTE U880 compatible with TD-SCDMA. China Telecom offered the ZTE Blade called ZTE N880 (512 MB CDMA) compatible with CDMA2000.
- Greece: Wind offered the ZTE Blade, with a 3.2-megapixel camera and TFT capacitive touchscreen display, running Android 2.1 Eclair. Update to Android 2.2 FroYo is available. Officially, it comes with 256 MB RAM. However, there is a patch that reveals 256 MB extra RAM that seems to be locked. So despite customers buying it from Wind with 256 MB RAM, they have the ability to patch it and unlock the RAM in order to have 512 MB.
- Finland: Saunalahti (Elisa) offered ZTE Blade with a 5.0-megapixel camera and TFT capacitive touchscreen display.
- France: Orange and Bouygues offered the ZTE Blade with a capacitive touchscreen display (LCD for Orange and AMOLED for Bouygues), 512 MB RAM and a 3.2 MP camera. It runs on Android 2.1 Eclair. SFR also distributed the ZTE Blade but under the rebranded "Android Edition by SFR STARADDICT".
- Germany: Base, an E-Plus brand, offered the ZTE Blade under a different name. The device is called Base Lutea and has a 5.0-megapixel camera and TFT capacitive touchscreen display.
- Hungary: T-Mobile offered the ZTE Blade with a capacitive touchscreen LCD, 512 MB RAM and a 3.2-MP camera. It runs on Android 2.1. Due to a faulty OS image, devices with only 256 MB of available RAM were distributed until middle December 2010, but an updated OS was later released to fix such devices. Telenor also offered the ZTE Blade.
- India: Dell offered the ZTE Blade under the name Dell XCD35, with a 3.2-megapixel camera and a TFT capacitive touchscreen display. Idea Cellular also offered the Chinese model of ZTE Blade as Idea Blade, with 256 MB RAM (not unlockable to 512 MB unlike other models), 3.2-megapixel camera and a TFT capacitive touchscreen display.
- Indonesia: Smartfren offered the CDMA version of ZTE Blade N880s (256 MB CDMA) under the name SmartFren Wide, followed by Telkom Flexi, with a 3.2-megapixel auto focus camera, a capacitive touchscreen display, and 256 MB RAM. It runs Android 2.2 Froyo, and 2 Gb memory card. Later, a GSM version of ZTE Blade with similar specs and running Android 2.2.2 was offered.
- Japan: SoftBank offered the Blade under the name SoftBank 003Z, with a 5.0-megapixel camera, running Android 2.2 Froyo.
- Lithuania: Omnitel offered the Blade, with a 5-megapixel camera and TFT capacitive touchscreen display, running Android 2.2 Froyo.
- Moldova: Orange Moldova offered the ZTE Blade with an LCD and a 3.2-MP camera. It runs Android 2.1 Eclair.
- Netherlands, the: KPN offered the ZTE Blade with an LCD and a 5.0-MP camera. It runs Android 2.2 Froyo.
- Philippines: Smart Communications began to offer the Blade as the Smart Netphone 701 on September 1, 2011 as a platform to launch its "Smartnet" social network. It has a TFT capacitive touchscreen, 512 MB of RAM, and runs on Android 2.2 Froyo.
- Poland: PLAY offered a version with 3.2-megapixel camera. Also offered by Orange Polska as Orange San Francisco and by Red Bull Mobile as RBM One (version with a 5.0-megapixel camera, OLED capacitive touchscreen and Android 2.2 Froyo).
- Portugal: Optimus offered the ZTE Blade under the name Optimus San Francisco, with a 3.2-megapixel camera and an OLED capacitive touchscreen display. Optimus provided an update to Android 2.2. TMN offers a customized version with a 5.0-megapixel camera and a TFT screen, under the name SAPO a5. The exterior design of the device was also changed.
- Russia: Beeline offered Beeline E400 with TFT display, 3.2 MPX camera. It runs Android 2.2.
- Spain: Yoigo (76.6% belonging to TeliaSonera) offered the Blade with a 3.2-megapixel camera and TFT capacitive touchscreen display running Android 2.2 Froyo for €0 with any contract.
- Sweden: Tele2 Comviq offered the ZTE Blade with a capacitive touchscreen LCD, 512 MB RAM and a 3.2-MP camera. It runs on Android 2.2 Froyo and was previously offered with Eclair 2.1. An update to Android 2.2 Froyo was available for Telia and Comviq customers who purchased the device with 2.1. Telia was again offering the phone. A version running Android 2.1 was available in stores from ZTE Sweden without affiliation to any network.
- Switzerland: Orange and Valora offered a version with a 3.2-megapixel camera and TFT capacitive touchscreen display.
- UK: White and grey versions were sold with TFT or OLED screens. The only way to check which screen the phone has is to look in Settings > About Phone > BUILD.
- US: Sold as FTV phone for 'Fashion TV'.
- In European countries: Named Orange San Francisco on Orange UK, Optimus Portugal, Orange Romania, Orange Moldova, Orange Austria, Orange Slovakia, Orange Switzerland, Mobistar and Orange Poland.

== Reviews ==
Reviews of the ZTE Blade have been positive due to the number of features offered while maintaining a low price. The screen in particular received praise, while the camera/camcorder quality was identified as one of the few downsides to the device.

== Community reception ==
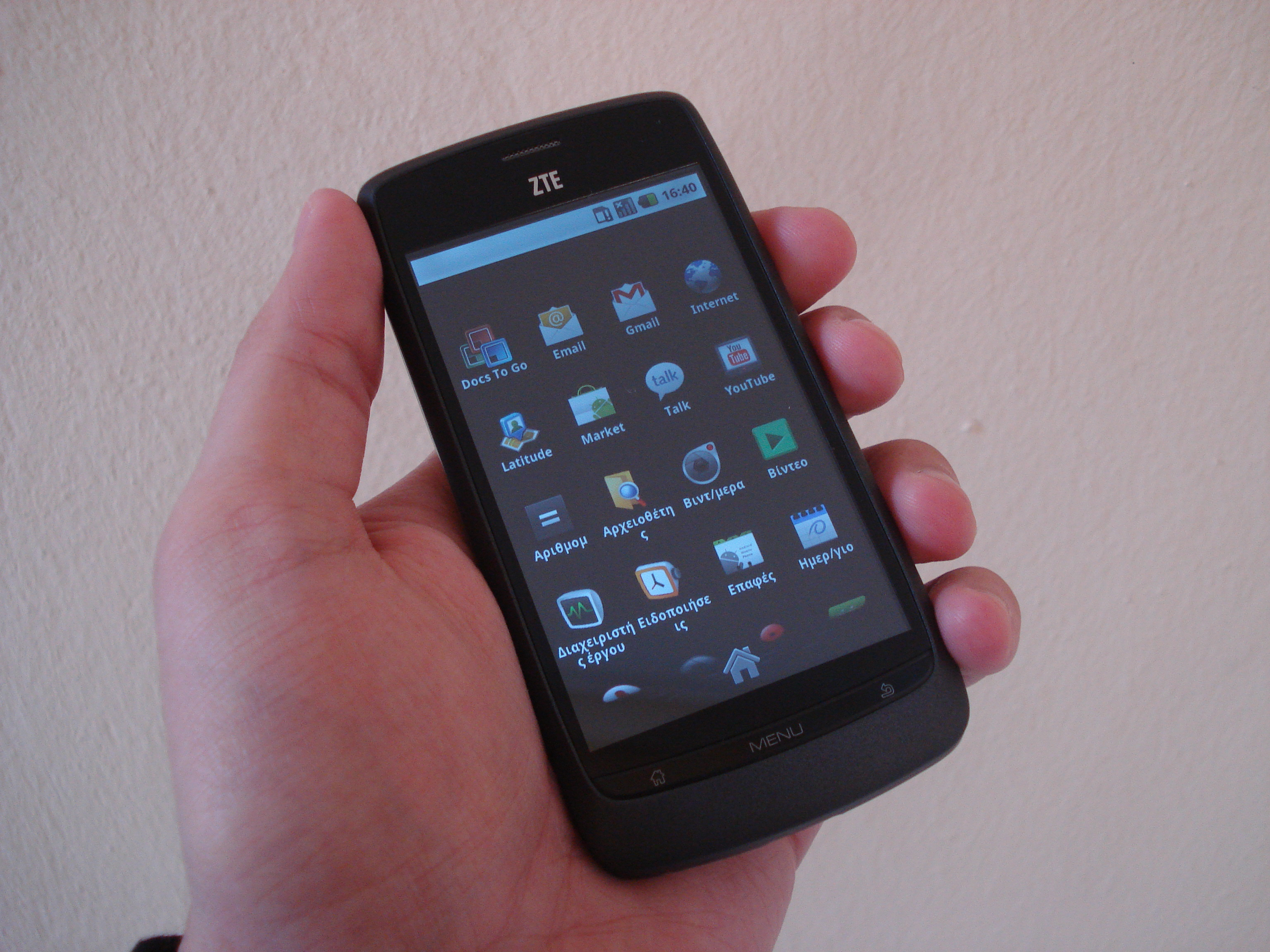
A Blade without a customized brand name

In the annual handset opinion survey of The Best non-htc Device of 2010, organised by xda-developers forum, the ZTE Blade won a total of 24.66% votes, placing it first among the 32 handsets including Samsung Galaxy S and Google's flagship phone Nexus S, placing them on the second and third position right behind ZTE Blade, as judged by forum users.

Various websites, mainly MoDaCo and xda-developers, have created a very large modifications scene around the Blade. Offering various custom ROMs (such as de-branded ROMs, for the re-branded devices) which remove all software that phone companies put on the device like applications and games, etc., or upgraded software versions (like Froyo, Gingerbread, Ice Cream Sandwich, or Jelly Bean) which do not come on the device in its stock configuration. Users who flash custom ROMs void their warranty and take risks in doing so, however it is possible to restore the original stock ROM.

- Android 2.2 (Froyo) is appearing on the Blade but with only certain carriers/re-branded devices. It is also available through custom ROMs such as Swedish Spring and an improved version, Portuguese Spring.
- Android 2.3 (Gingerbread) has also been released on the Blade through CyanogenMod 7, and modified ROMs originally made for the ZTE Libra.
- Android 4.0 (Ice Cream Sandwich) is being worked on through ColdfusionX, unofficial CyanogenMod 9, ICS4blade project, and later several builds and ports of modified ROMs like AOKP (Android Open Kang Project) or MIUI V4.
- Android 4.1, 4.2 and 4.3 (Jelly Bean) is available as an unofficial port of CyanogenMod 10, 10.1, 10.2 and several builds and ports of another popular aftermarket ROMs like AOKP (Android Open Kang Project), Paranoid Android, or MIUI V4.1.
- Android 4.4 (KitKat) based on CyanogenMod 11 is also available for testing, but it is a work in progress (both Blade port and CyanogenMod 11 itself) and not suitable for daily use, yet.

At first, because of the lack of essential components such as OpenMAX libraries for ARMv6, Blade running Android 4.0+ lacks hardware video acceleration. However, the fix has been found and the current Ice Cream Sandwich and Jelly Bean ROMs can be considered as fairly stable ROM for daily use, as all the major features have worked and been fixed.

== See also ==
- CyanogenMod
- Galaxy Nexus
- List of Android smartphones
- ZTE Max Duo
