= Makati Tuscany =

Residential building in Makati, Philippines

- the Makati Tuscany in 2022.
- Interactive map of the Makati Tuscany area

General information
- Status: Completed
- Type: Residential
- Location: 6751 Ayala Avenue, Makati, Philippines
- Coordinates: 14°33′14″N 121°01′35″E
- Completed: 1976
- Management: The Makati Tuscany Condonimium Corporation

Height
- Height: 95 m (311.68 ft)

Technical details
- Floor count: 27
- Lifts/elevators: 4

Makati Tuscany is a 27-storey residential building in Ayala Avenue, in Makati beside Discovery Primea. It has a height of 95 m (311.68 ft). It was completed in 1976.

== See also ==
- List of tallest buildings in Metro Manila
