= Circuit Makati =

Development area in Metro Manila, Philippines

Coordinates: 14°34′29″N 121°01′08″E

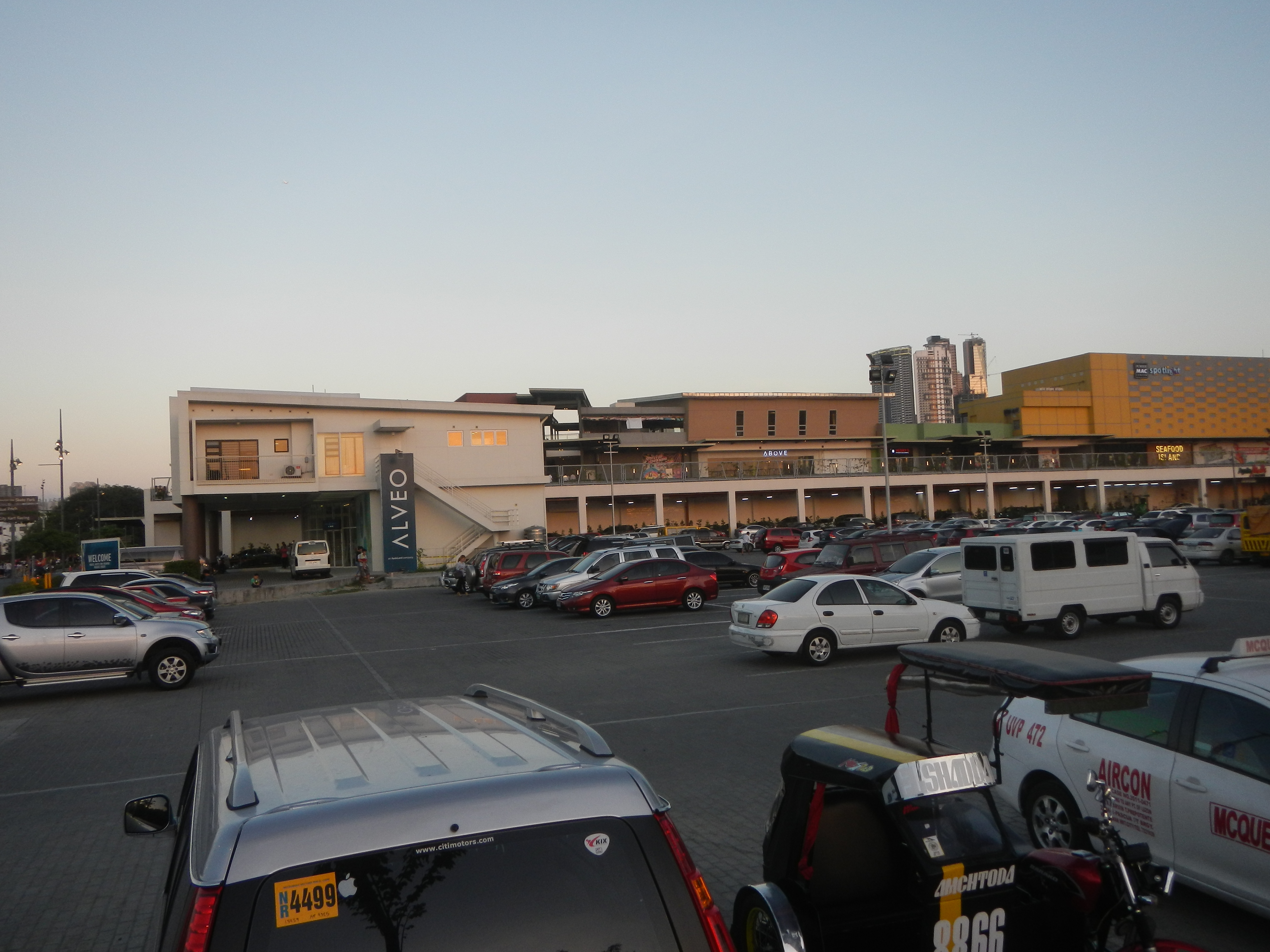
- Circuit Lane and open parking area

Project
- Opening date: 2011; 15 years ago
- Developer: Ayala Land
- Owner: Ayala Land
- Website: Ayala Malls Circuit

Physical features
- Major buildings: Globe Circuit Events Ground, Santiago and Libertad Cua Park, Circuit Corporate Center, Ayala Malls Circuit, Blue Pitch, The Stiles Enterprise Plaza, Solstice, Callisto, Astela, The City Flats, Circuit Makati Transport Terminal
- Transport: Express bus services

Location
- Interactive map of Circuit Makati
- Country: Philippines
- Location: Carmona, Makati, Metro Manila

Area
  - Total: 22 ha (54 acres)

Circuit Makati is a riverfront redevelopment project by Ayala Land on the site of the former Santa Ana Race Track in Makati, Metro Manila, Philippines. The 21-hectare (52-acre) site located in the northwest portion of Makati, on the south bank of the Pasig River, is planned to contain a mixed-use entertainment complex which would include an indoor theater, a shopping mall, hotels and residential and office skyscrapers. It would also contain a football turf, skate park and an outdoor entertainment area. The development is envisioned to become the new entertainment district of Makati and the city's lifestyle hub.

== Location ==
Circuit Makati occupies a large portion of barangay Carmona. It is bounded by the Pasig River on the north, Hippodromo and Herradura Streets on the south, Trabajo and Fortuna Streets to the east, and A.P. Reyes Street (which connects to Chino Roces Avenue) and H. Santos Street to the west. The district of Santa Ana in Manila is within a few kilometers from the site. It is located just 1.5 kilometers (0.93 mi) north of the Makati CBD accessible via Ayala Avenue and South Avenue, and from Century City and Rockwell Center via J.P. Rizal Avenue and Kalayaan Avenue.

== Background ==
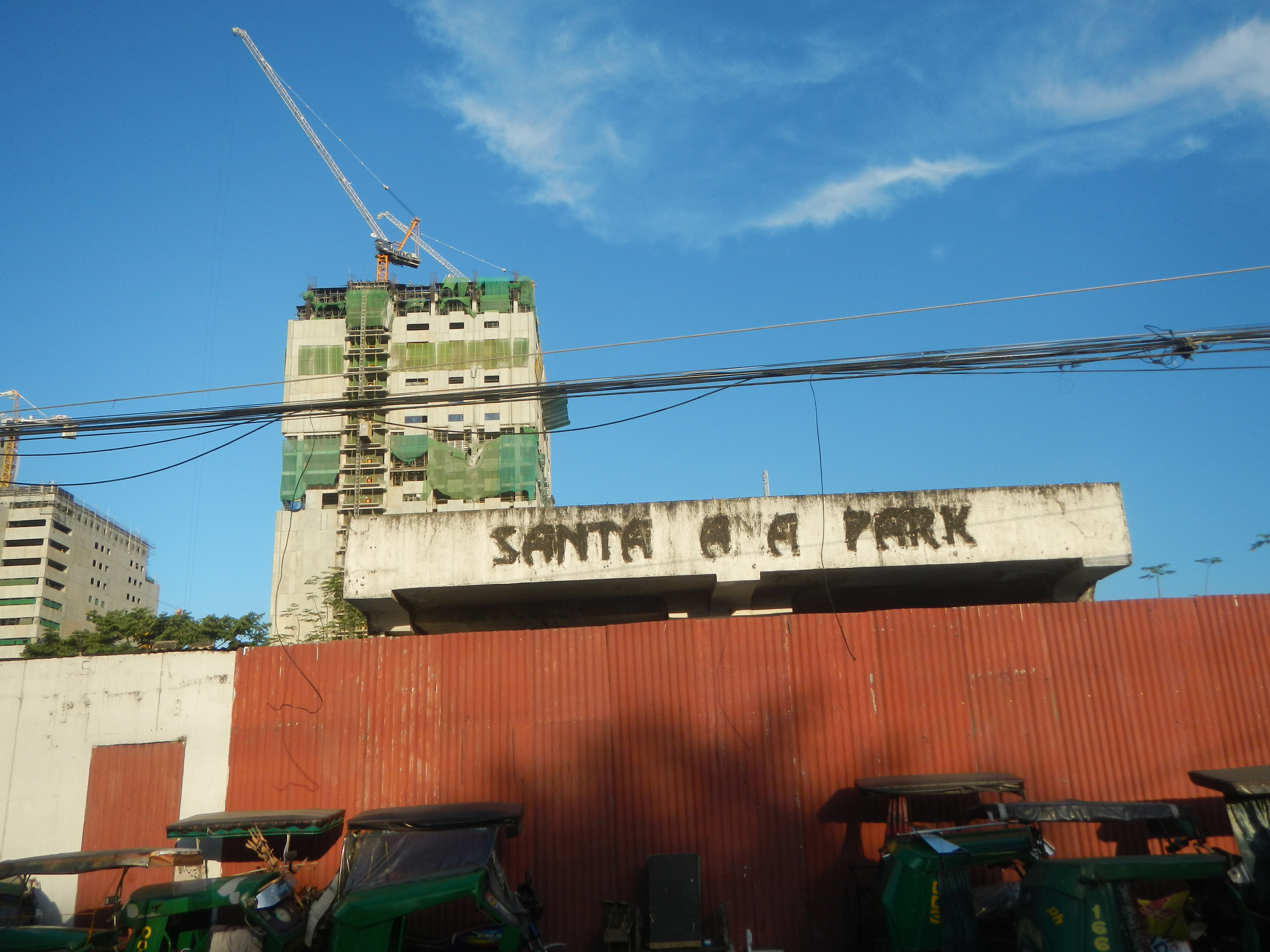
Ruins of the old Santa Ana Park

The present-day site of Circuit Makati was previously occupied by the Santa Ana Park, a horse racetrack which operated from 1937 to 2008. Built in the Art Deco style, the racetrack was home to the Santa Ana Turf Club, the forerunner of what is now the Philippine Racing Club which introduced thoroughbred horse racing in the country. Prior to its establishment as a sporting and recreation facility, the site was home to the Santa Ana Cabaret, a dance hall and music venue for Manila's high society in the early 1900s.

In 2009, a year after the hippodrome was closed, the Philippine Racing Club opened its new home in the Santa Ana Park (Saddle and Clubs Leisure Park) in Naic, Cavite. The club then entered into a joint venture agreement with Ayala Land and its subsidiary, Alveo Land, in 2011 for the development of the property.

== Buildings and facilities ==
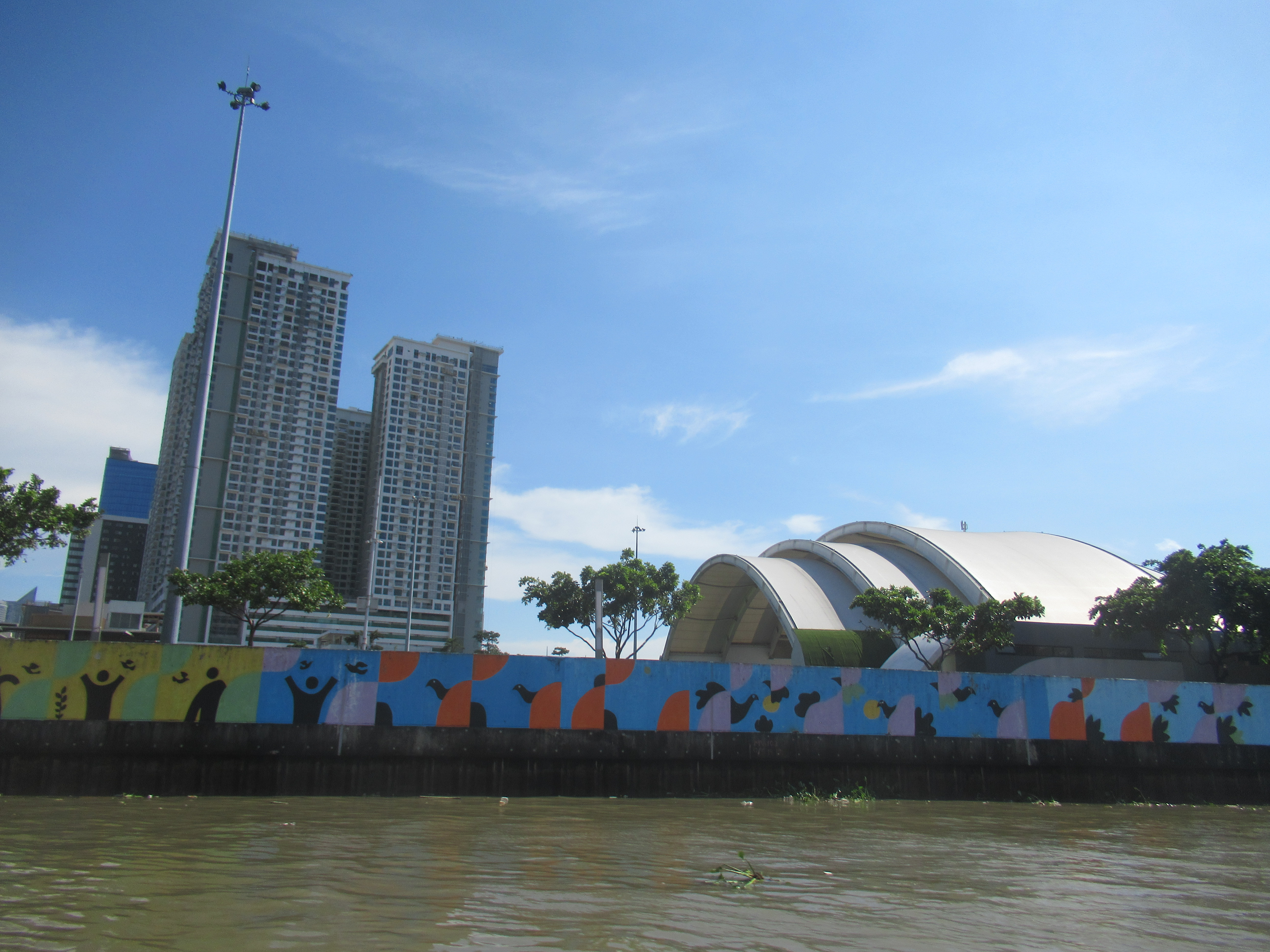
View of Circuit Makati from the Pasig River prior to the construction of the Contemporary Art Center

- Circuit Corporate Center, which consist of two office buildings with a total gross leasable area of 70,000 square meters (750,000 sq ft)
- BPO 3, a third office building
- Ayala Malls Circuit, a lifestyle center by Ayala Malls
  - Circuit Lane, a retail walk that composes the older, northern half of the mall
  - Power Mac Center Spotlight Blackbox Theater, a 300-seater performance venue on top of Circuit Lane
  - S&R Membership Shopping Circuit Makati
  - Samsung Performing Arts Theater, a 1,500-seat indoor performing arts theater
  - St. John Paul II Chapel, a Roman Catholic chapel at the second level of Circuit Lane
- Blue Pitch (formerly Gatorade Chelsea FC Blue Pitch), a 10,000-square-meter (110,000 sq ft) artificial football pitch
- The Stiles Enterprise Plaza, an office-condominium by Alveo Land consisting of two towers
- Solstice, a residential condominium tower by Alveo Land.
- Callisto, a residential condominium tower by Alveo Land.
- Astela, a residential condominium tower by Alveo Land.
- The City Flats Circuit Makati, a dormitory.
- Moxy Circuit Makati, an upcoming 260-room hotel, which is Moxy Hotels' first Philippine branch.
- Circuit Makati Transport Terminal, a known bus terminus and garage of point-to point (P2P) buses going to One Ayala, Pilar Village in Las Piñas, and Nuvali in Santa Rosa, Laguna.
- Contemporary Art Center, a proposed art museum, with a 2,200-square-meter (24,000 sq ft) gallery space, a 400-square-meter (4,300 sq ft) educational space, an outdoor events space, and areas hosting public arts. It is expected to be completed by 2027.
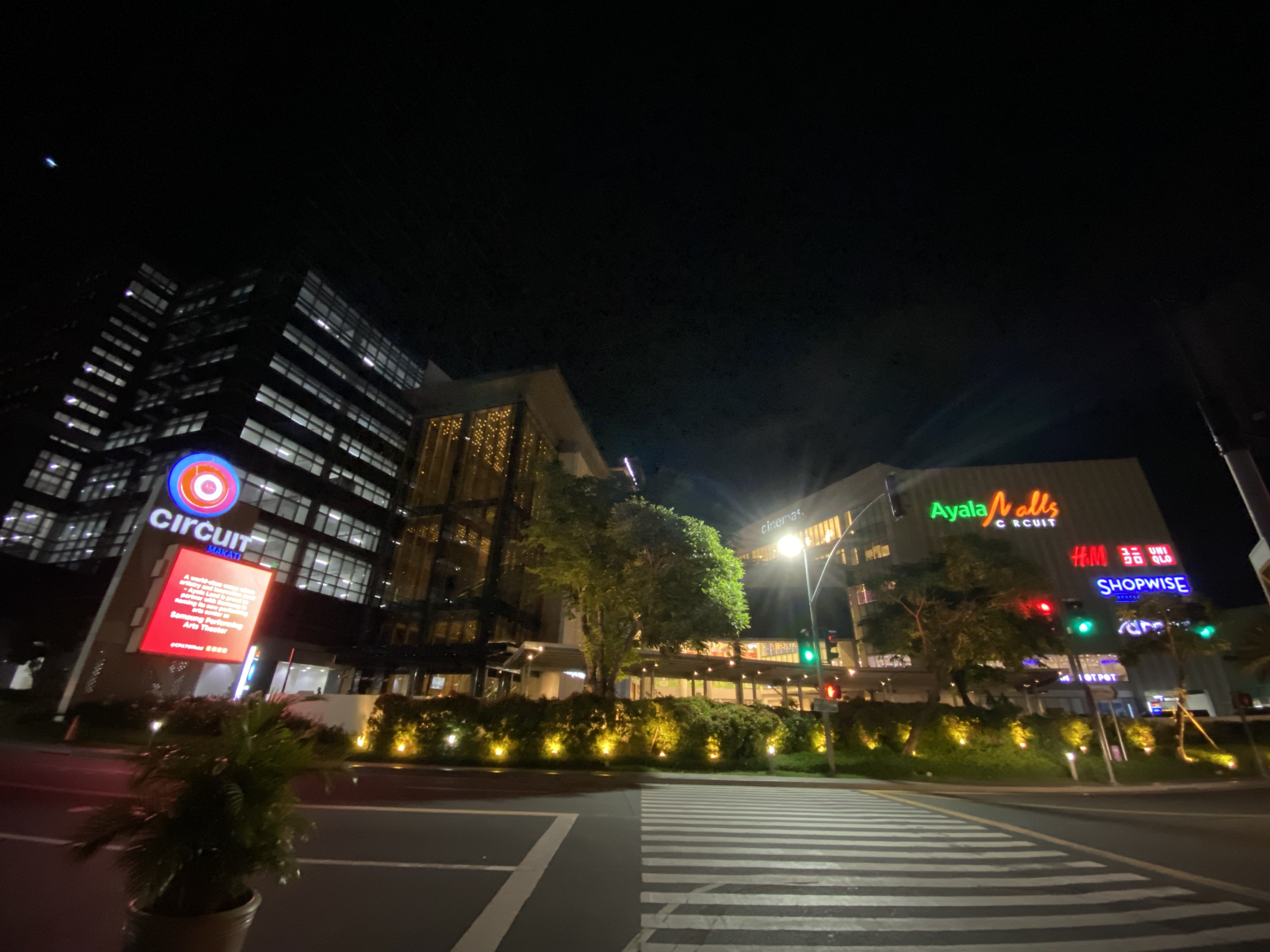
Ayala Malls Circuit

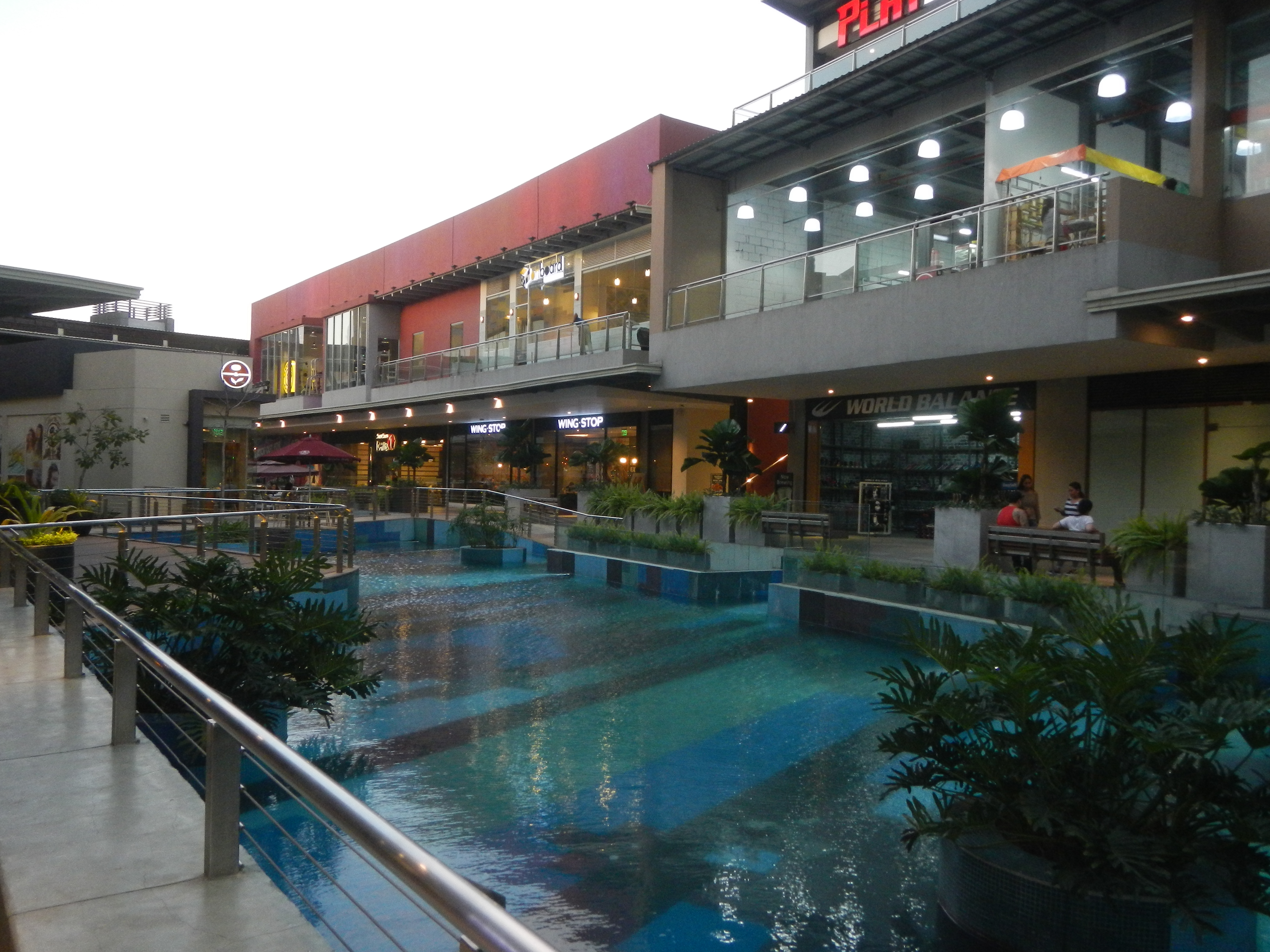
Circuit Lane

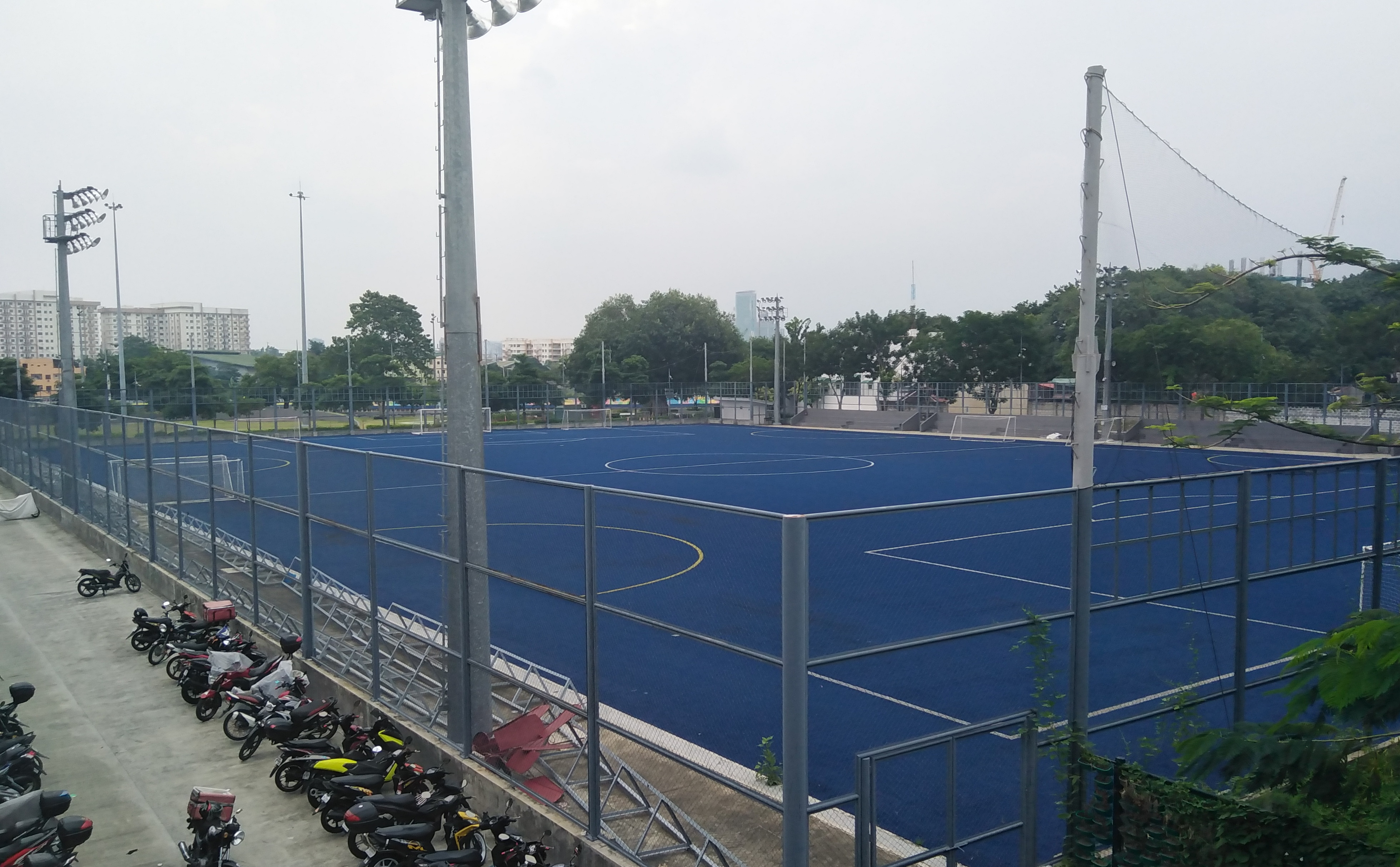
Blue Pitch

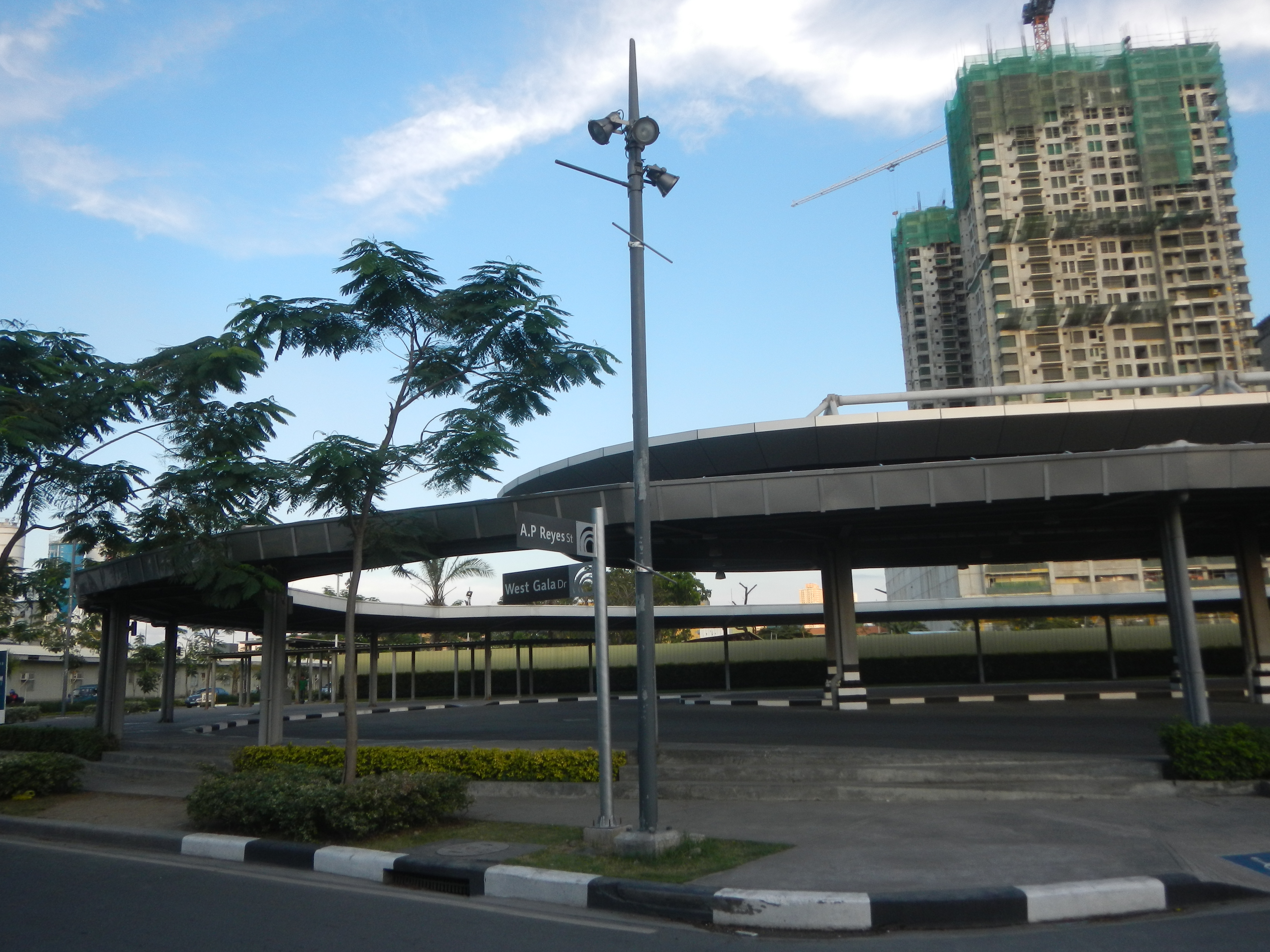
Circuit Makati Transport Terminal

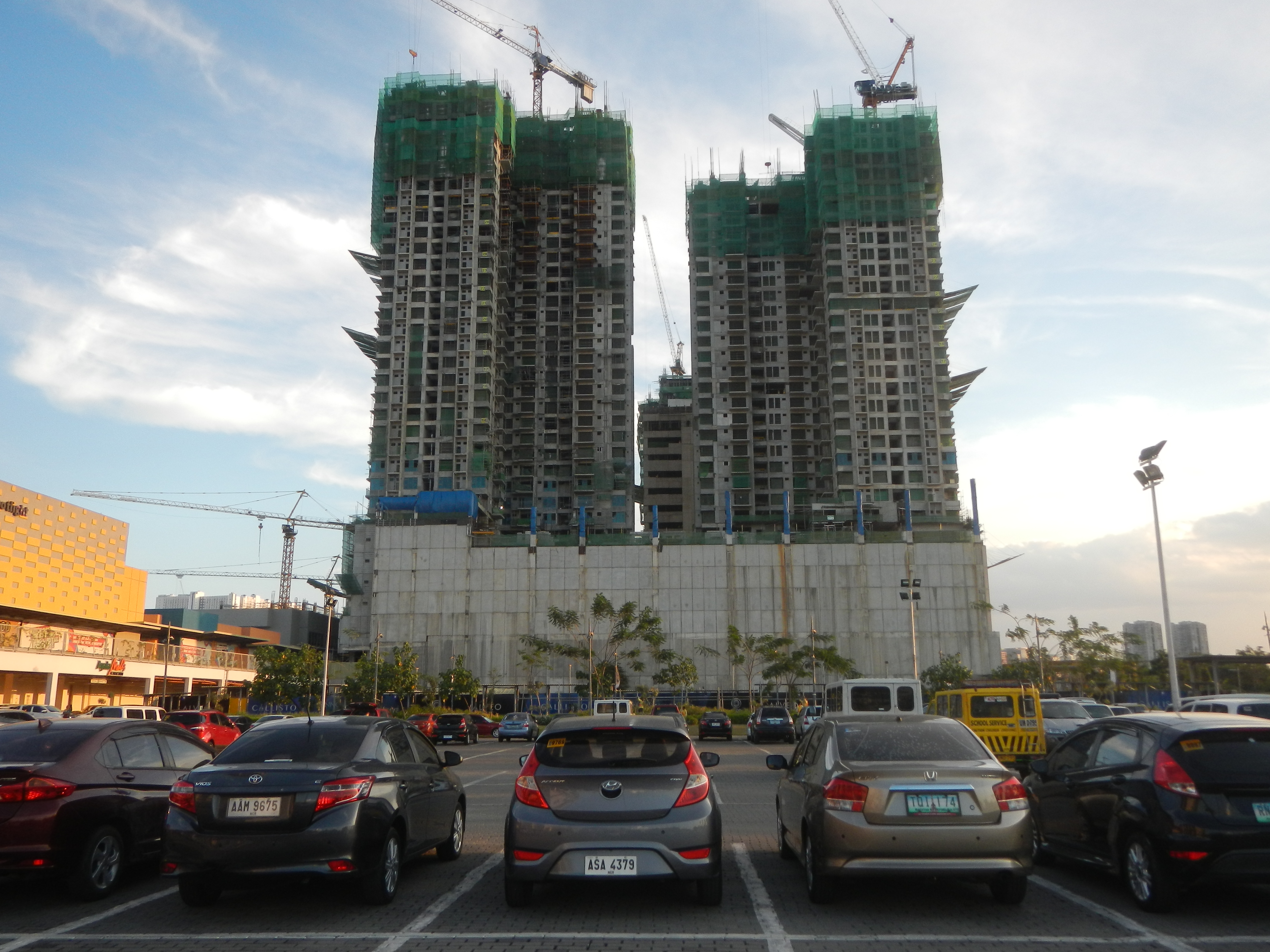
Solstice under construction, 2017

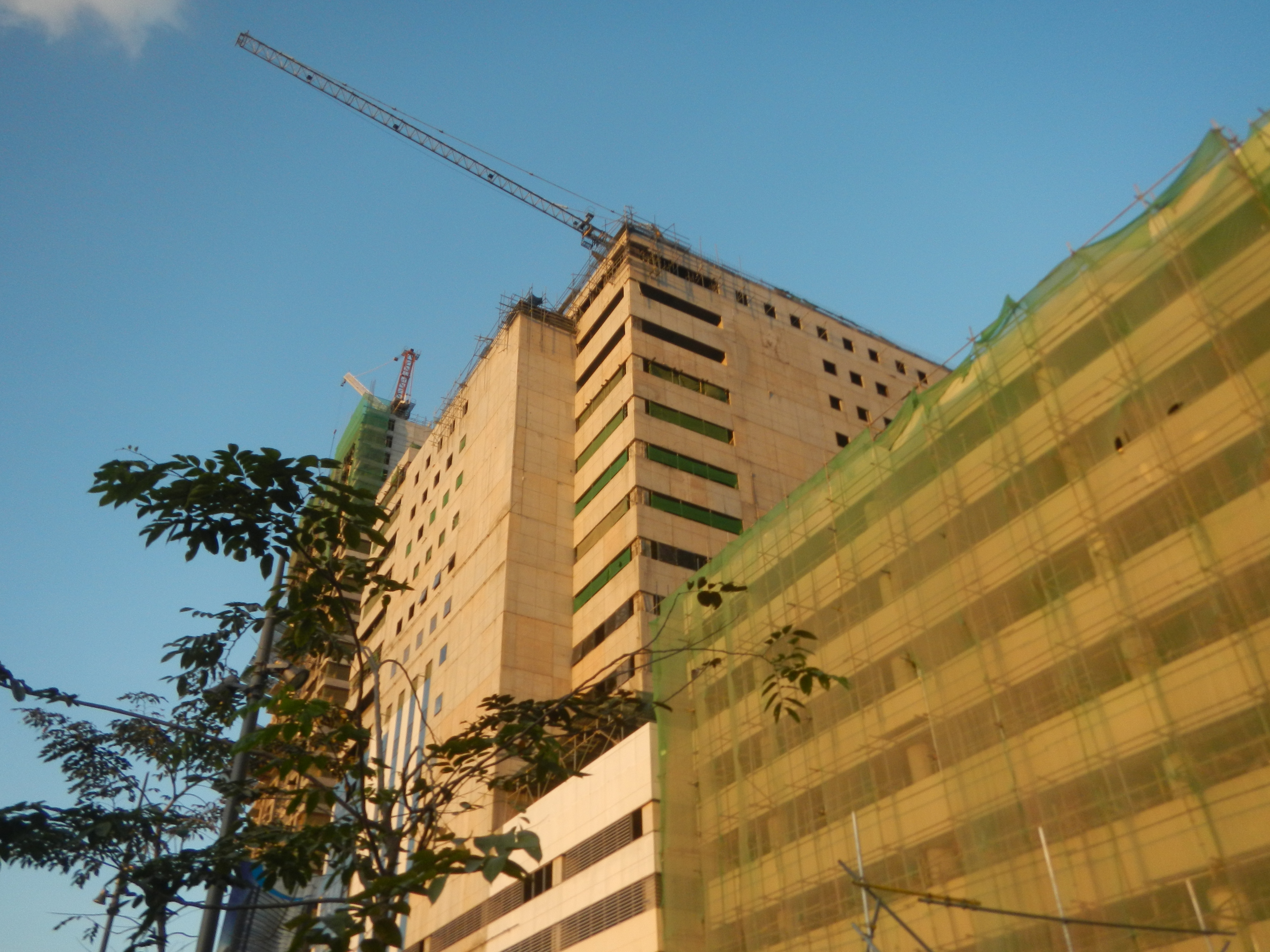
Circuit Corporate Center Two under construction, 2017

The northwestern portion of the development will accommodate a future residential development. Additionally, commercial lots (which include an interim park) and two linear parks were added into the development on the previously undeveloped portion of the former Santa Ana Park.

=== Former facilities ===
The following facilities were closed to give way to the Contemporary Art Center:

- Santiago and Libertad Cua Park, a park at the riverbank of the Pasig River
- GOMO Skate Park (formerly Mountain Dew Skate Park), a former 1,000-square-meter (11,000 sq ft) skate area covered with concrete skateboard ramps. This was located at the riverside.
- Globe Circuit Events Ground, a 2-hectare (4.9-acre) outdoor venue that could accommodate 20,000 people for concerts, dance performances, fashion shows and sporting events.
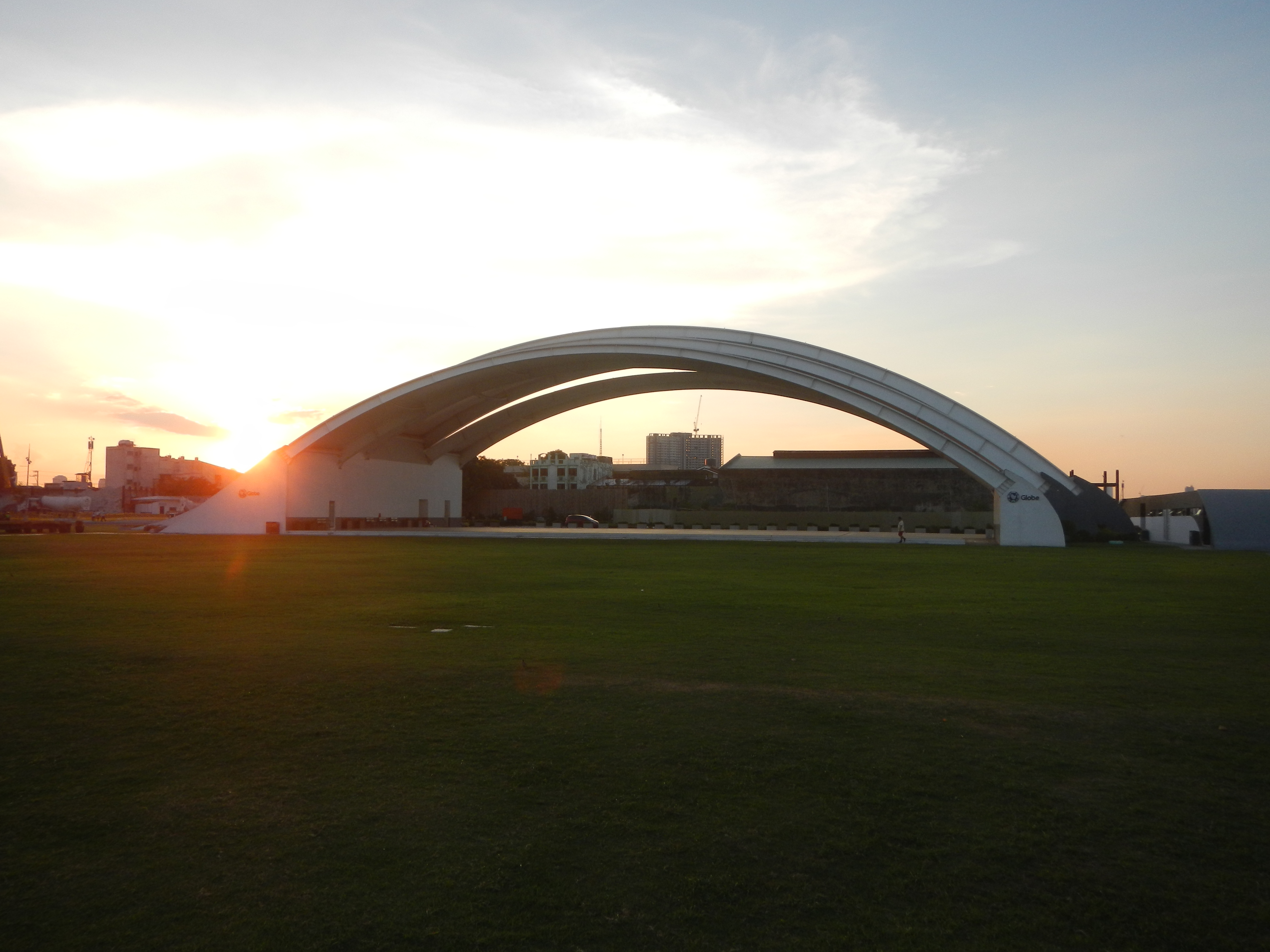
Globe Circuit Event Grounds

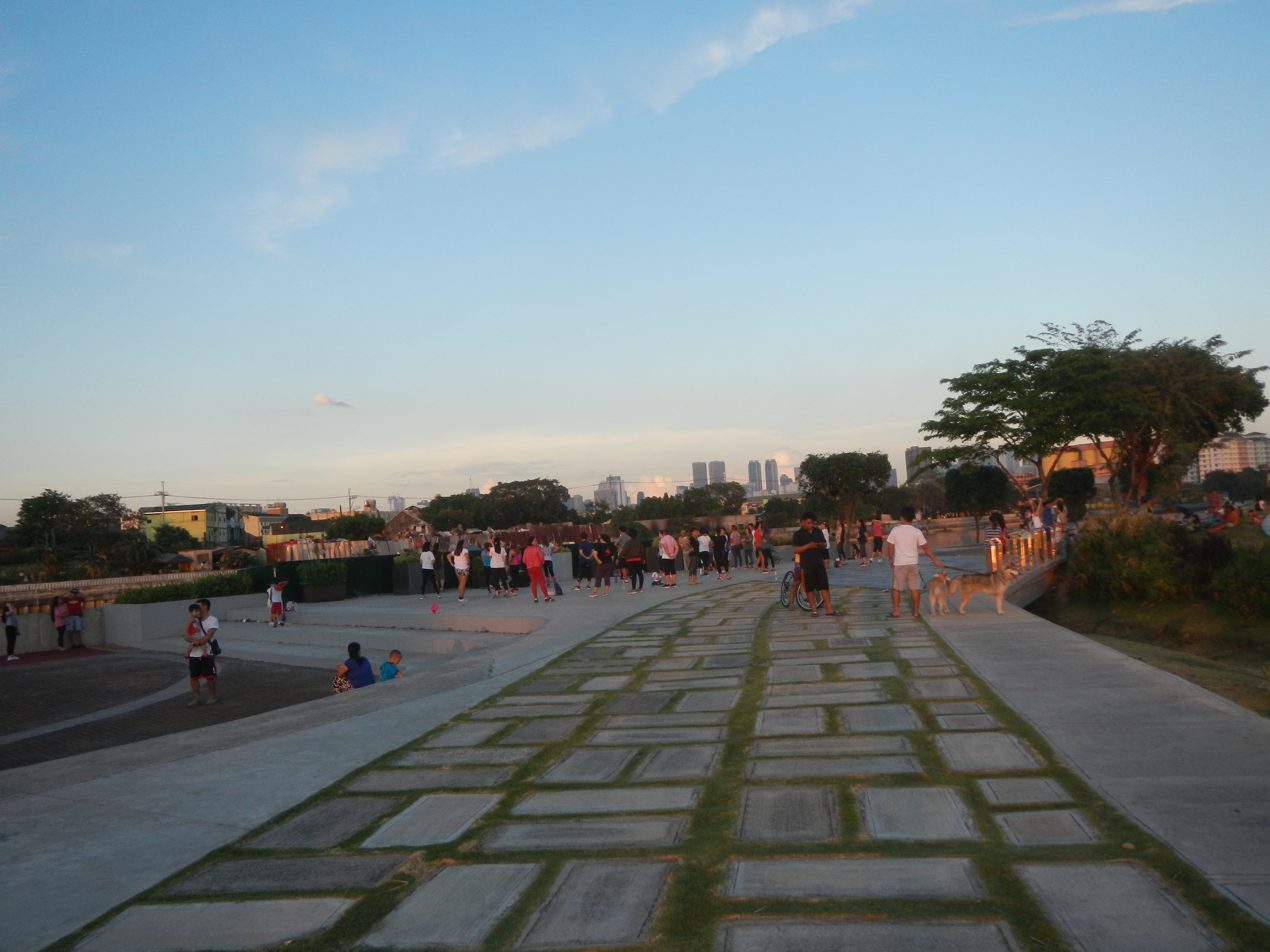
Santiago and Libertad Cua Park

== See also ==
- San Lazaro Tourism and Business Park
