= South Avenue (Makati) =

Street in Metropolitan Manila, Philippines

Coordinates: 14°34′3″N 121°1′3″E

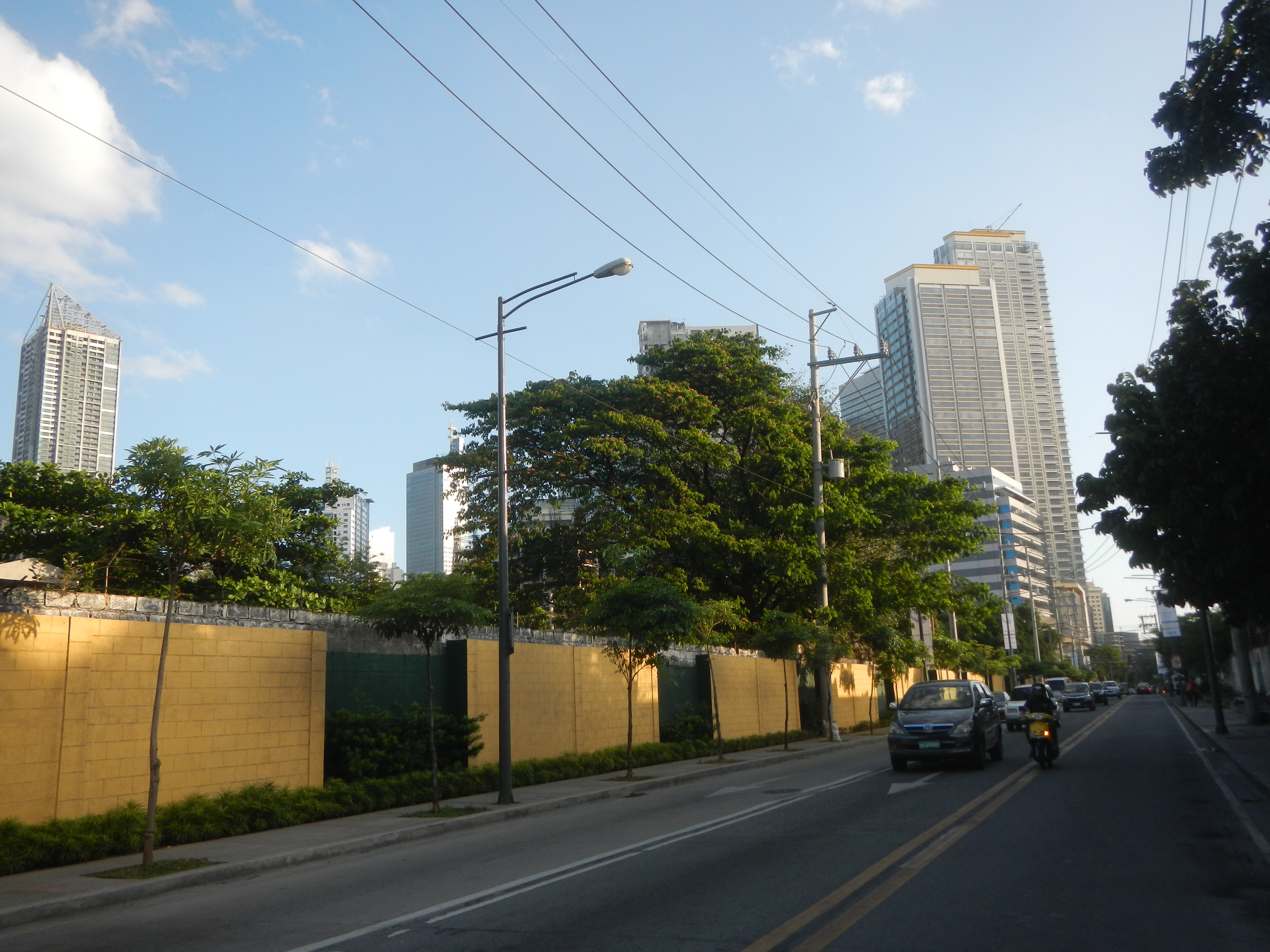
- The Manila South Cemetery on South Avenue
- Interactive map of South Avenue
- Maintained by: Department of Public Works and Highways - Metro Manila 2nd District Engineering Office
- Length: 805 m (2,641 ft)
- Location: Makati
- North end: J.P. Rizal Avenue in Olympia
- Major junctions: Kalayaan Avenue; Vito Cruz Extension (Pablo Ocampo Street)
- South end: Metropolitan Avenue in Santa Cruz and Bel-Air

South Avenue is a short extension of Ayala Avenue north of Metropolitan Avenue in Makati, Metro Manila, Philippines. It forms the border between the Manila South Cemetery to the east and Barangay Santa Cruz to the west, running for 805 meters (2,641 ft) in a southwest–northeast direction from its southern terminus at Metropolitan Avenue to its intersection with J.P. Rizal Avenue in Barangay Olympia. Since 2017, it has carried one-way northbound traffic to decongest traffic in and out of the Makati Central Business District. It has a short extension into Barangay Olympia and Circuit Makati (formerly the Santa Ana Race Track) as Taliba Street. It is also the location of the Ecoville Townhouses and F. Benitez Elementary School. It is formerly a component road of Circumferential Road 3.

The avenue originated from an old road linking J.P. Rizal, Makati's main road, to the Manila South Cemetery and eventually to McKinley–Pasay Road near the Nielson Field (now occupied by the Makati Central Business District). The origin of the avenue's name is unclear, but it may be derived from the cemetery it passes.

== Intersections ==
The entire route is located in Makati.

km	mi	Destinations	Notes
		Metropolitan Avenue	Traffic light intersection; southern terminus. Continues south as Ayala Avenue.
		Pablo Ocampo Street (Vito Cruz Extension)	Traffic light intersection.
		Kalayaan Avenue	Traffic light intersection. One-way road.
		J.P. Rizal Avenue	Traffic light intersection; northern terminus. Continues north to Circuit Makati as Taliba Street.
1.000 mi = 1.609 km; 1.000 km = 0.621 mi: Incomplete access

== See also ==
- Ayala Avenue
- Manila South Cemetery
