= ZTE Max Duo =

Smartphone model

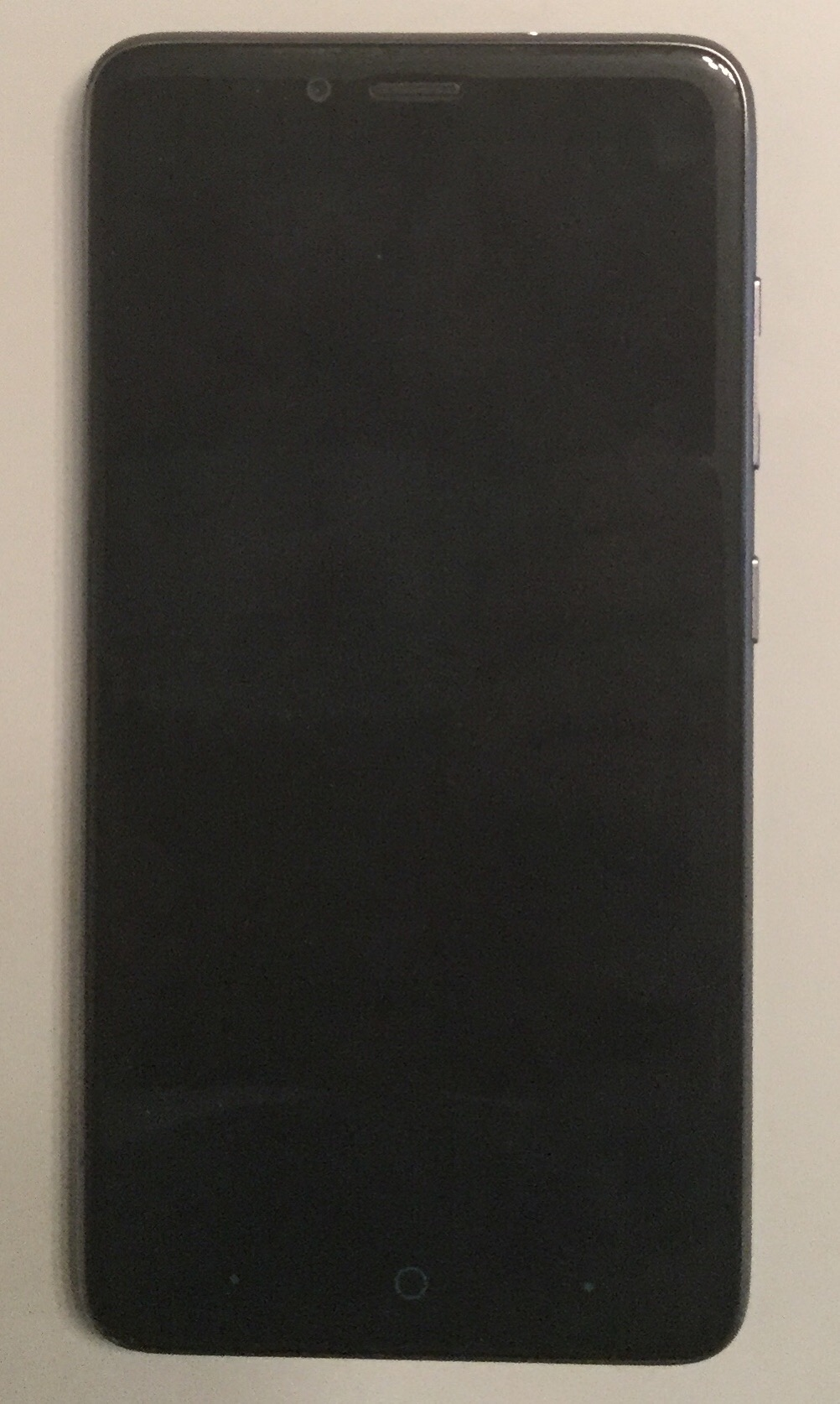
- Manufacturer: ZTE
- Type: Phablet
- First released: August 7, 2015; 10 years ago
- Availability by region: August 7, 2015: Australia; Canada; China; France; Germany; Hong Kong; India; Indonesia; Japan; Malaysia; Maldives; Mongolia; Myanmar; Saudi Arabia; Singapore; South Korea; Sri Lanka; United Kingdom; United States; Uzbekistan; Vietnam
- Dimensions: 165.1 mm (6.50 in) H 83.8 mm (3.30 in) W 9.1 mm (0.36 in) D
- Weight: 183 g (6.5 oz)
- Operating system: Original & Current: Android 5.1.1 Lollipop
- Storage: 16 GB and 2 GB of RAM
- Battery: 3500 mAh (13.1Wh)
- Rear camera: dual; 13 MP & 2 MP
- Front camera: 5 MP
- Display: 5.8 in (150 mm) 4096×3072; GSM, CDMA
- Model: Z963VL / Z962BL
- Website: www.zteusa.com/maxduo

The ZTE Max Duo LTE is a phablet smartphone designed, developed, and marketed by ZTE. The phone was released in August 2015.

== Specifications ==
=== General specs ===
Form Factor	Candy Bar
Camera Features	Auto Focus + LED Flash
Video Capture	4096x3072
CPU	1.5GHz Octa-Core
Expandable Memory	No microSDHC card included, capacity up to 64GB
Frequencies	UMTS: 850/AWS/1900 MHz | LTE: B2/B4/B5/B17; CDMA: 800/1900, LTE B4/B13, Support SRLTE, No CA
Bluetooth	4.0
WiFi	802.11 b/g/n
GPS	Yes
USB	Yes, quick charge compatible
Headset	Yes, 3.5 mm
Hearing Aid Complaint	Yes, M4/T3
TTY Capability	Yes

=== Software ===
The ZTE Max Duo runs Android Lollipop 5.1.1 launched in 2014.

== See also ==
- List of Android smartphones
- ZTE
- List of ZTE products
- ZTE Blade
