= The Estate Makati =

Building in Makati, Philippines

- The Estate Makati under construction in October 2026

General information
- Status: Under construction
- Location: 6747 Ayala Avenue, Makati, Metro Manila, Philippines
- Coordinates: 14°33′11.8″N 121°01′37.6″E
- Construction started: 2019
- Estimated completion: 2025
- Opening: 2026
- Cost: At least ₱10 billion (estimate)
- Owner: ST 6747 Resources Corp.

Height
- Antenna spire: 300 m (984.3 ft)
- Roof: 276.8 m (908.1 ft)

Technical details
- Floor count: 54

Design and construction
- Architecture firm: Foster + Partners
- Developer: ST 6747 Resources Corp.
- Main contractor: D. M. Consunji, Inc.

Other information
- Number of rooms: 180
- Number of suites: 8

Website
- https://theestatemakati.com/

The Estate Makati is a 300 m (980 ft) residential skyscraper under construction in Makati, Metro Manila, Philippines.

== Construction ==
The Estate Makati is a project of ST 6747 Resources Corp. which is a joint venture of SM Development Corp. (SMDC) and Federal Land, Inc. The groundbreaking ceremony was held in January 2019. DM Construction was tasked as the general contractor of the building project estimated to cost at least ₱10 billion.

== Architecture and design ==
The Estate Makati will be a 60-storey building standing 300 meters (980 ft) tall making it among the tallest buildings in the Philippines and the tallest along Ayala Avenue. It will be built on top of a 3,500 square meters (38,000 sq ft) lot at Apartment Ridge. British architectural firm Foster + Partners was involved which designed The Estate as a cross-shaped building to reduce adverse sunlight exposure to occupants.

Foster + Partners conducted various research including topographical studies and Makati's climate and sun patterns in designing the building. Finding sunlight in the Philippines to be strong, the firm designed The Estate's windows to angle in a certain way so it could provide non-excessive lighting to the building's units all of which were constructed column-free. The windows were also double-glazed to minimize heat from sunlight. The Estate is also the first residential building in the country to be built using double-slab technology which conceals the electricals and plumbing between two layers of concrete. The building will also be supported on top of a one-storey high plinth.

The firms behind the project are aiming for the building to get LEED Gold Version 4 certification.

== Facilities ==
The skyscraper will host 188 residential units including eight penthouse suites. The building also has 618 parking slots with charging support for electric vehicles.
