= Netphone 701 =

Phone produced by Smart Communications

Netphone
- Brand: Smart Communications
- First released: September 2011; 14 years ago
- Related: ZTE Blade
- Form factor: Slate
- Operating system: Android 2.2 "Froyo"
- System-on-chip: Qualcomm MSM7227 chipset
- CPU: 600 MHz ARM CPU
- GPU: Adreno 200 GPU
- Memory: 430 MB RAM
- Storage: 512 MB
- Removable storage: microSD slot v2.0 compatible (supports up to 32 GB)
- Rear camera: 3.2 MP with autofocus
- Display: 480×800 px, 3.5 in (89 mm), 267 PPI, WVGA, TFT LCD capacitive touchscreen
- Data inputs: Multi-touch capacitive touchscreen display, 3-axis accelerometer, digital compass, proximity and ambient light sensors
- Website: smart.com.ph/About/profile/innovations-and-awards/the-netphone
- References: http://www.yugatech.com/mobile/smart-netphone-701-review/

The Netphone 701 is a phone marketed and produced by Smart Communications. It was launched in 2011 at the GSMA Mobile World Congress.

== Specifications ==
=== Hardware ===
The Netphone's body is mostly plastic with a matte finish, while the screen is made out of glass. It has an LCD with a resolution of 480x800. A micro-USB port is used for charging, while a headphone jack is also available.

=== Software ===
The phone ships with Android 2.2 out of the box. It cannot be updated to future versions of Android.

==== SmartNet ====
SmartNet is composed of widgets and apps developed by Smart: Smart Inbox, IM, Social Stream, Real-time Balance, and Smart Center. There is also a Global Directory, which lists all Netphone users. The Global Directory can be used to help find friends and add them to the user's contact list. Since the directory has no moderation, some users are anonymous.
