= ZTE Blade II =

ZTE Blade II V880+
- Brand: ZTE
- Developer: ZTE
- Manufacturer: ZTE
- Type: Smartphone
- Series: Blade
- First released: March 2012; 14 years ago
- Predecessor: ZTE Blade V880
- Compatible networks: GSM / HSPA
- Form factor: Slate
- Colors: (Black); (White)
- Dimensions: 115.1 mm (4.53 in) H 57.9 mm (2.28 in) W 10.9 mm (0.43 in) D
- Weight: 117.4 g (4.14 oz)
- Operating system: Android 2.3.6 (Gingerbread), upgradable to 4.0 (Ice Cream Sandwich)
- System-on-chip: Qualcomm MSM7227A Snapdragon S1
- CPU: 1.0 GHz Cortex-A5
- GPU: Adreno 200
- Memory: 512 MB RAM
- Storage: 512 MB
- Removable storage: microSDHC (dedicated slot)
- SIM: Mini-SIM
- Battery: Removable Li-Ion 1200 mAh battery
- Rear camera: 5 MP, AF
- Display: 3.5 inches, Super AMOLED, 480 x 800 pixels (~267 ppi density)
- Model: V880+
- References: "ZTE Blade II V880+ - Full phone specifications". GSMArena.

The ZTE Blade II is an Android touchscreen mobile phone manufactured by the Chinese phone company ZTE. It was unveiled at MWC 2012 in Barcelona on February 27, 2012 and released in March. It served as an upgraded variant of the original ZTE Blade.

== Specifications ==
=== Hardware ===
The Blade II is powered by a Qualcomm MSM7227A Snapdragon S1 chipset featuring a 1.0 GHz Cortex-A5 CPU central processor and an Adreno 200 GPU GPU alongside a removable 1,200 mAh battery,

It includes 512 MB of RAM and 512 MB of internal storage, which can be expanded further via a dedicated microSDHC card slot. The phone is equipped with a 5-megapixel primary rear camera supporting autofocus.

=== Software ===
The Blade runs on Android 2.3.6 Gingerbread, but also upgradable to Android Ice Cream Sandwitch.
