= Makati Sky Plaza =

- Interactive map of the Makati Sky Plaza area

General information
- Status: Completed
- Type: Office
- Location: 6788 Ayala Avenue, Legaspi Village, Makati, Philippines
- Coordinates: 14.5586°N 121.0175°E
- Completed: 1999
- Owner: Makati Sky Plaza, Inc.

Height
- Height: 100 m (328.08 ft)

Technical details
- Floor count: 24

Makati Sky Plaza is a 23-storey high-rise office building in Makati, Metro Manila, Philippines. It is located along Ayala Avenue in the Makati CBD and was completed in 1999. The building's primary tenants include the Philippine headquarters of Standard Chartered Bank, Japan Airlines, and The Bank of Tokyo-Mitsubishi UFJ.
