= Discovery Primea =

Mixed-use residential tower in Makati, Philippines

- Discovery Primea in 2014
- Interactive map of the Discovery Primea area

General information
- Status: Completed
- Type: Hotel, Residential
- Location: 6749 Ayala Avenue, Makati, Philippines
- Coordinates: 14.5534°N 121.0270°E
- Completed: 2013
- Opened: February 2015; 11 years ago
- Owner: JTKC Land

Technical details
- Floor count: 68

Design and construction
- Architects: Kenzo Tange; Jorge Y. Ramos
- Developer: JTKC Land
- Structural engineer: Datem Inc.

Discovery Primea is a 68-storey mixed-use residential tower and one of the tallest buildings in the Philippines located in Makati along Ayala Avenue. It stands on the former Gilarmi Apartments, then co-owned by the first ever crowned Finnish-born Miss Universe Armi Kuusela and ex-husband businessman Virgilio Hilario, and one of the earliest urban residential condominiums in the Makati Central Business District. JTKC, Inc. is the developer of the residential condominium and one of earliest developer of residential condominium units in the Philippines. The latter also owns the Discovery Suites, a service-apartment in the Ortigas Center business district in Mandaluyong. The residential tower was opened in February 2015.

== History ==
The Discovery Primea was built on the land where the Gilarmi Apartments used to stand. The Gilarmi Apartments was the first serviced apartment building to be built in the Makati Central Business District.

In 2013, construction of the top floor was topped out signaling the completion of the construction of Discovery Primea Tower, effectively making it one of the tallest buildings of the Philippines.

== See also ==
Street-level view of Discovery Primea in 2018

- List of tallest buildings in the Philippines
