= Ayala Avenue =

Major avenue in the National Capital Region of the Philippines

Coordinates: 14°33′22″N 121°1′19″E

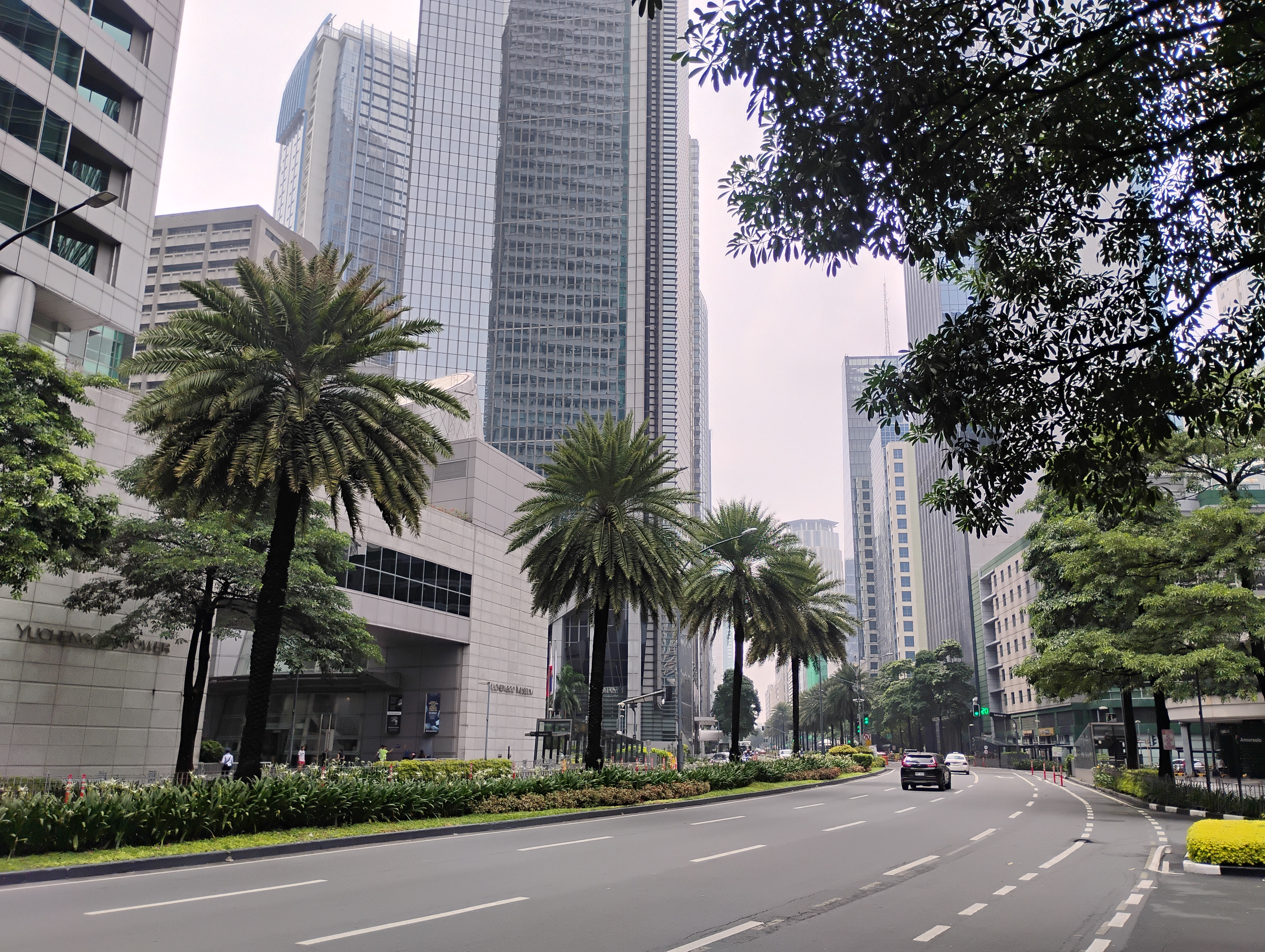
- The avenue in 2025
- Interactive map of Ayala Avenue
- Namesake: Zóbel de Ayala family
- Maintained by: Makati Central Estate Association and Ayala Land
- Length: 2.3 km (1.4 mi)
- Restrictions: Trucks, pedicabs, and tricycles not allowed between Gil Puyat Avenue and EDSA
- Location: Makati
- North end: Metropolitan Avenue
- Major junctions: N190 (Gil Puyat Avenue)
- South end: AH26 (EDSA)

Construction
- Completed: 1950s

Ayala Avenue is a major thoroughfare in Makati, the Philippines. It is one of the busiest roads in Metro Manila, crossing through the heart of the Makati Central Business District. Because of the many businesses along the avenue, Ayala Avenue is nicknamed the "Wall Street of the Philippines" and dubbed in the 1970s and 1980s as the "Madison Avenue of the Philippines".

== History ==
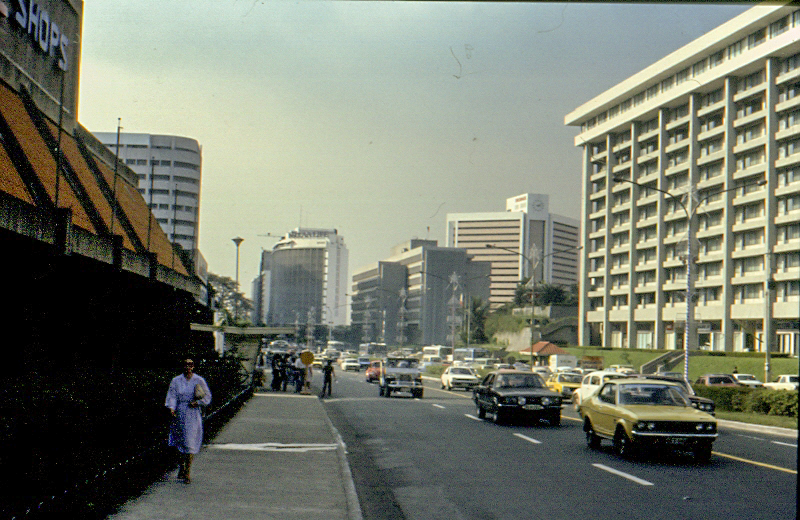
Ayala Avenue east of Makati Avenue, 1982

Ayala Avenue's segment from the present-day Gil Puyat (Buendia) Avenue to Makati Avenue used to be the primary runway of the Nielson Airport, which was inaugurated in 1937 and was one of the first airports built in Luzon, while its extension occupies a segment of an old road that connected the Santa Ana Park and McKinley–Pasay Road. The airport was destroyed during the Japanese occupation of the Philippines on December 10, 1941, and resumed operations after the end of World War II in 1947. The airport closed in 1948, and its permanent facilities were passed on to the owner of the land, Ayala y Compañía. The runways were then converted into roads as part of Ayala's plan to build a new business district in the area. The modern avenue was completed in the mid-1950s, eventually connecting it to Highway 54 (now EDSA).

In 1978, Ayala Avenue was involved in the feasibility study conducted by the Japan International Cooperation Agency for the proposed the Circumferential Road 3 (C-3) of Manila's arterial road network. The construction of a flyover along Ayala Avenue, crossing Buendia Avenue and Malugay Street, was also proposed but was never realized. However, the widening of the avenue's segment north of Malugay and the addition of a new segment between Kamagong Street and Metropolitan Avenue, linking it to South Avenue, were materialized. The extension north of Buendia once became part of C-3. In 1998, a flyover was built for left turners onto EDSA northbound.

=== Bicycle lanes ===
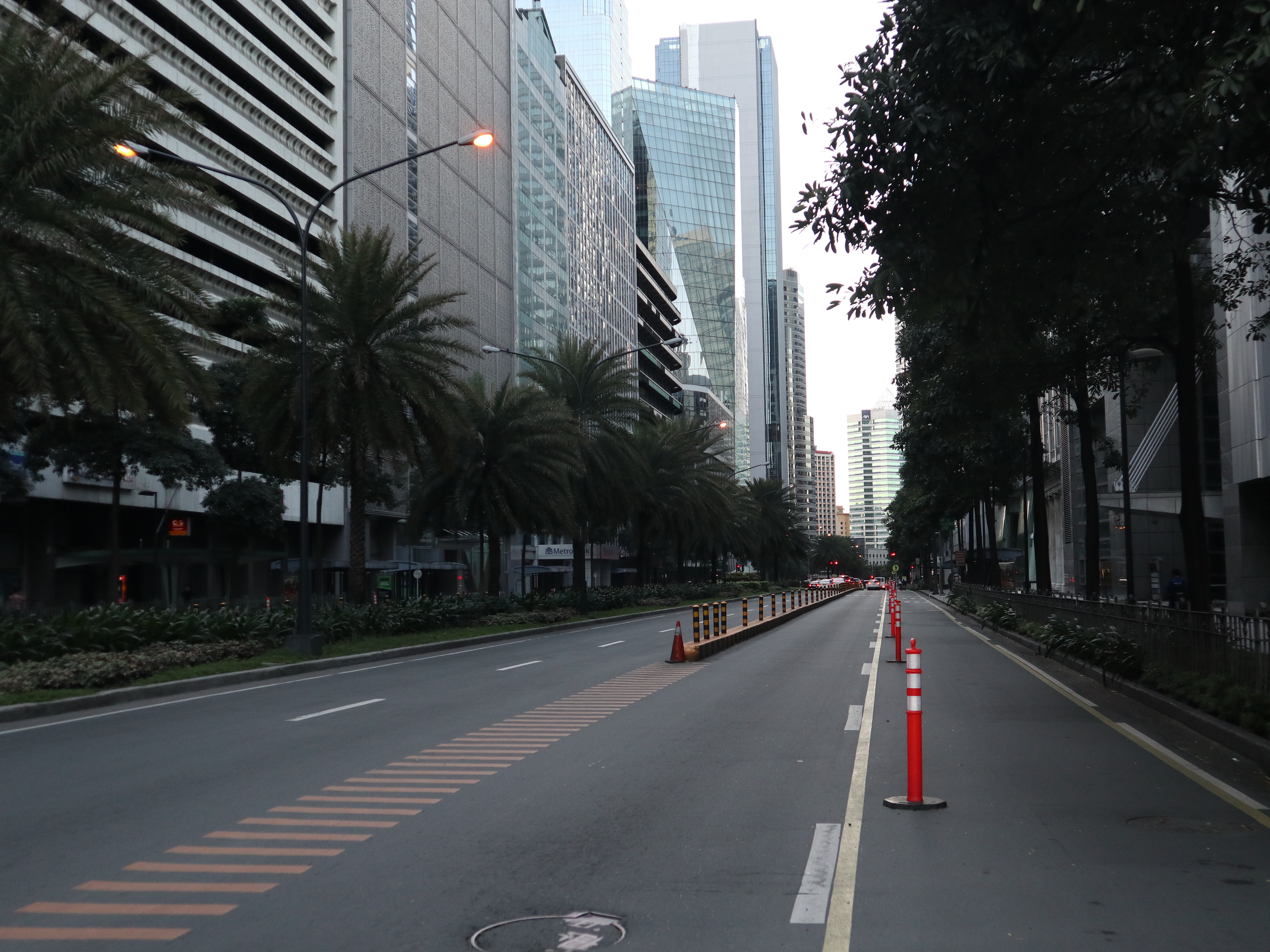
The middle lane of Ayala Avenue is designated as a public transport lane, while the outermost lane is designated as a bicycle lane.

In 2020, in response to the growing popularity of bicycle commuting and ownership amidst the COVID-19 pandemic, the Makati Central Estate Association (MaCEA) and Ayala Land, through its Make it Makati campaign, designated 3-meter-wide (9.8 ft) bicycle lanes along Ayala Avenue from Gil Puyat Avenue to EDSA, protected by bollards and exclusive to non-motorized bicycles and scooters. Bicycle boxes were also added to intersections to allow left turns. The lanes underwent a trial run on August 7, 2020, and were completed on September 7, 2020. Following this, designated stops for public transport services were also moved to the middle lane of the road.

==== Shared lanes scheme controversy ====
On February 10, 2023, MaCEA and Ayala Land announced plans to replace the Ayala Avenue bicycle lanes with sharrows effective February 15. Despite the backlash from cycling groups, authorities proceeded with the changes. On February 12, cycling groups opposed to the scheme organized a protest bike ride along Ayala Avenue. In response, authorities deferred the implementation of the sharrows scheme to March 6 to gather feedback and engage in dialogue with the cycling community.

== Landmarks ==
=== Ayala Center ===
The Ayala Center, which comprises eight distinct shopping centers, is partially located on Ayala Avenue, specifically the Glorietta complex (including Rustan's), 6750 Ayala Avenue which once hosted the local office of Microsoft, Makati Shangri-La Hotel and One Ayala.

=== Ayala Triangle ===
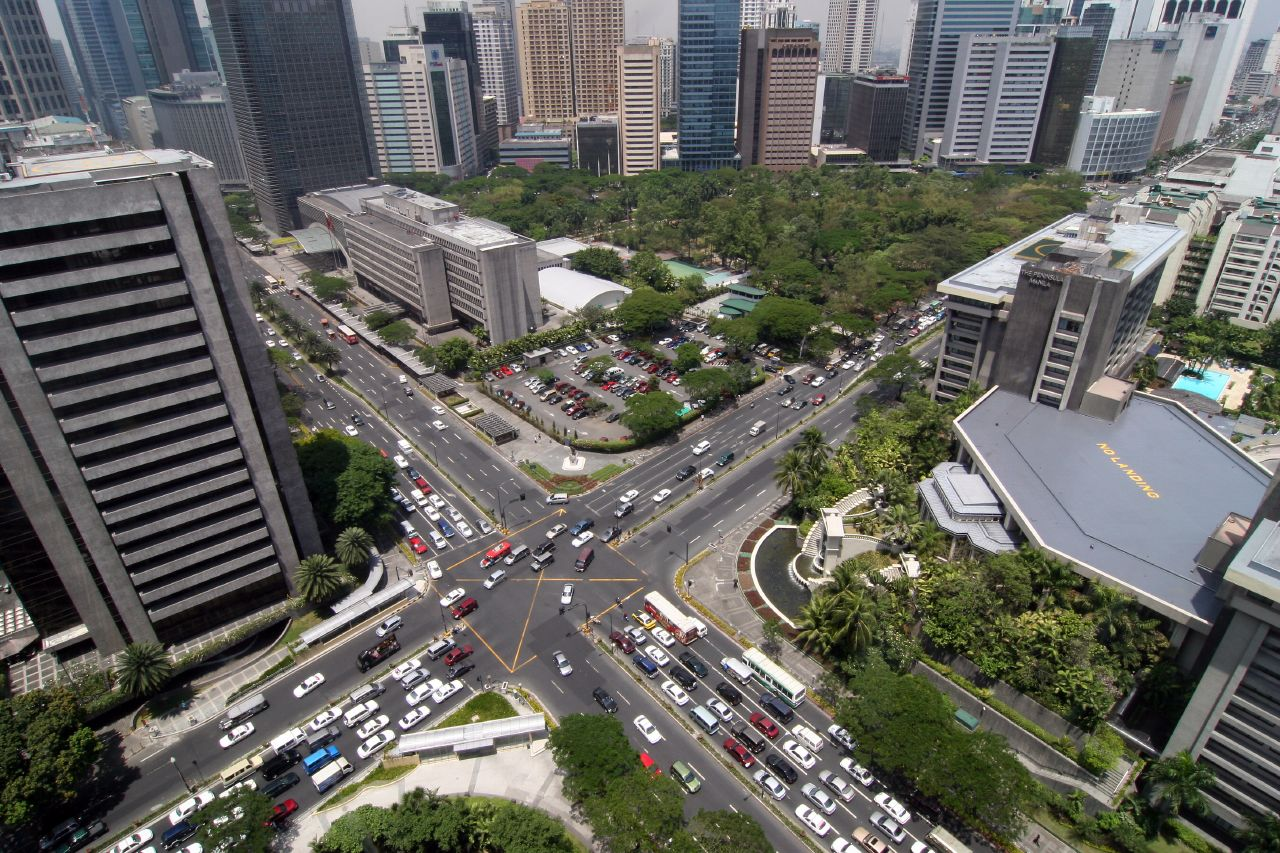
The Ayala Triangle, taken 2006 , from the Makati Shangri-La hotel

The Ayala Triangle is a sub-district of the Makati Central Business District, comprising the parcel of land between Ayala Avenue, Makati Avenue and Paseo de Roxas and the buildings on those streets. Ayala Corporation, its subsidiaries and affiliates, in addition to many multinational companies, banks and other major businesses, are located within the triangle. A few upscale boutiques, restaurants and a park called Ayala Triangle Gardens are also located in the area.

=== PBCom Tower ===
PBCom Tower, one of the tallest buildings in the Philippines, is located at Ayala Avenue and V.A. Rufino Street. It serves as the headquarters of the Philippine Bank of Communications. It was the tallest building in the Philippines from 2000 to 2017.

=== Apartment Ridge ===
Apartment Ridge is a complex of apartment and condominium buildings along Makati and Ayala Avenues outside Urdaneta Village. The Peninsula Manila, Makati Tuscany, Discovery Primea, The Estate Makati, Ritz Towers, Pacific Plaza Condominium, Twin Towers, and Urdaneta Apartments are located in this area.

=== Government-owned buildings ===
- Makati City Police Station
- Makati City Fire Station

Both have relocated to Gil Puyat Avenue quite near the corner with the Osmeña Highway but still also in Barangay San Antonio, in 2024. However, these old facilities along Ayala Avenue remain intact as of January 2025.

=== Other famous buildings ===
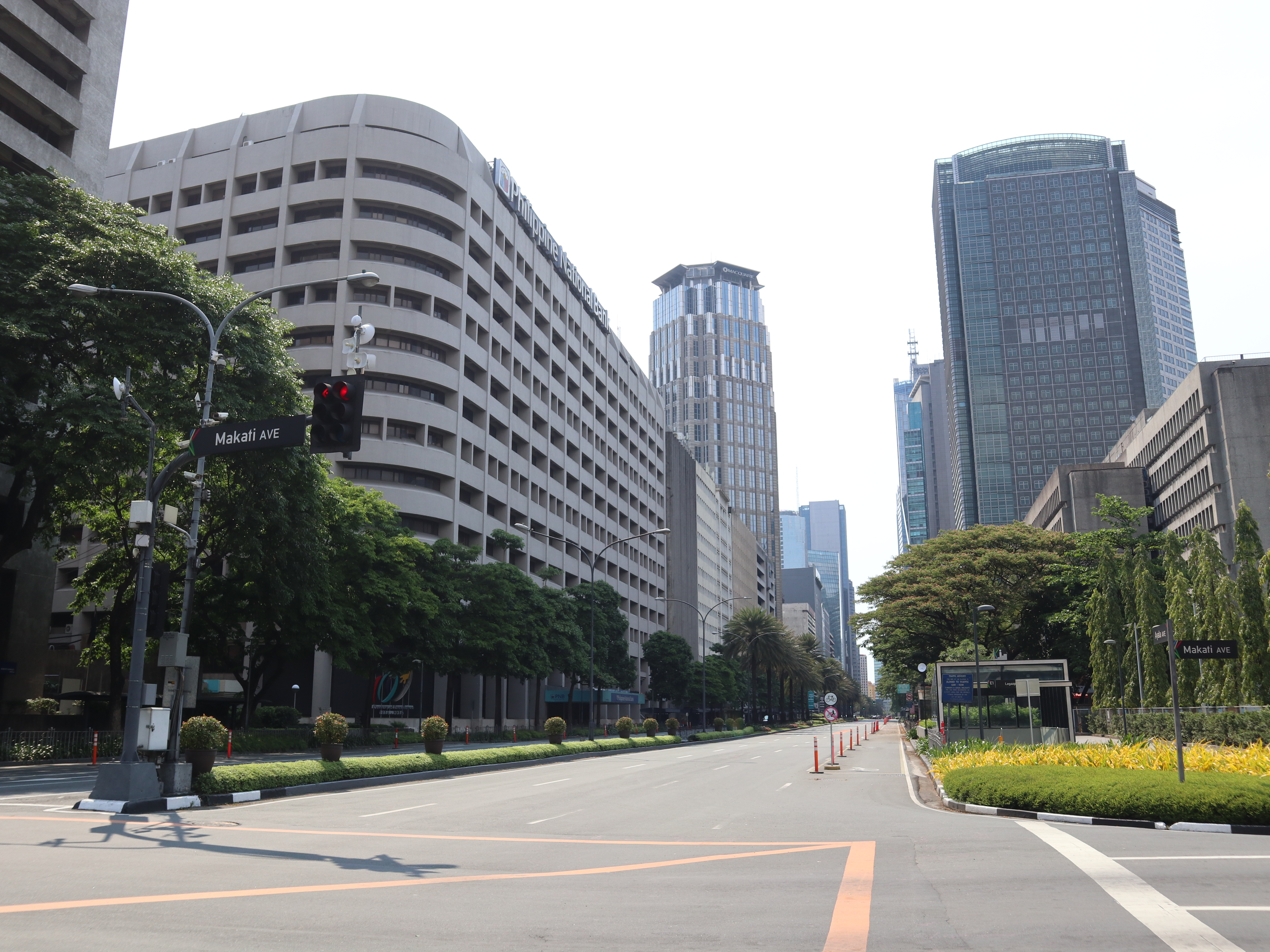
Buildings (Philippine National Bank, The Enterprise Tower, Ayala Tower One, Makati Stock Exchange) along Ayala Avenue past its intersection with Makati Avenue

Ayala Avenue is home to many other landmark buildings, which house many large Philippine businesses including:

- Alphaland Makati Place
- Alveo Financial Tower
- Ayala North Exchange
- Ayala Avenue Office Tower (former headquarters of Procter & Gamble Philippines, Inc.)
- Ayala Tower One (headquarters of the Ayala Corporation and home to the Philippine Stock Exchange's Makati trading floor)
- Bank of Makati Building (headquarters of Bank of Makati)
- Bank of the Philippine Islands headquarters (under reconstruction)
- Bankmer Building
- Cocolife Building
- Convergys Philippines Services Center
- The Enterprise Center neoclassical twin towers
- G.T. International Tower
- Insular Life Building (old headquarters of Insular Life)
- KPMG Center
- LKG Tower
- L. V. Locsin Building
- Makati Sky Plaza
- Multinational Bancorporation Centre
- NEX Tower
- The Peninsula Manila
- PeopleSupport Center
- PLDT Tower (headquarters of PLDT, Inc., also referred to as "Makati General Office" (MGO) )
- PNB Makati Center (Allied Bank Center; former headquarters of Allied Bank)
- RCBC Plaza (headquarters of the Rizal Commercial Banking Corporation)
- Robinsons Summit Center
- Rufino Plaza (headquarters of the Rufino Family)
- Security Bank Center (headquarters of the Security Bank Corporation)
- Sikatuna Building (Formerly National Life Insurance Building)
- Smart Tower (headquarters of Smart Communications)
- SSS Makati Building (former headquarters of Union Bank of the Philippines, Inc.)
- STI Holdings Center
- Sycip, Gorres, Velayo & Co. (SGV) Building
- Vicente Madrigal Building
- VGP Center (Formerly The Manila Banking Corporation Building or TMBC)

=== Other structures ===
- The monuments of Benigno Aquino Jr. and Gabriela Silang
- Pedestrian underpasses at Parkway Drive (Glorietta), Legazpi, Paseo de Roxas, V.A. Rufino and Salcedo/H.V. Dela Costa intersections
- Buendia Freedom Park
- Philippine Dental Association Building
- Toyota Makati

== Events ==
=== Car-Free Sundays ===
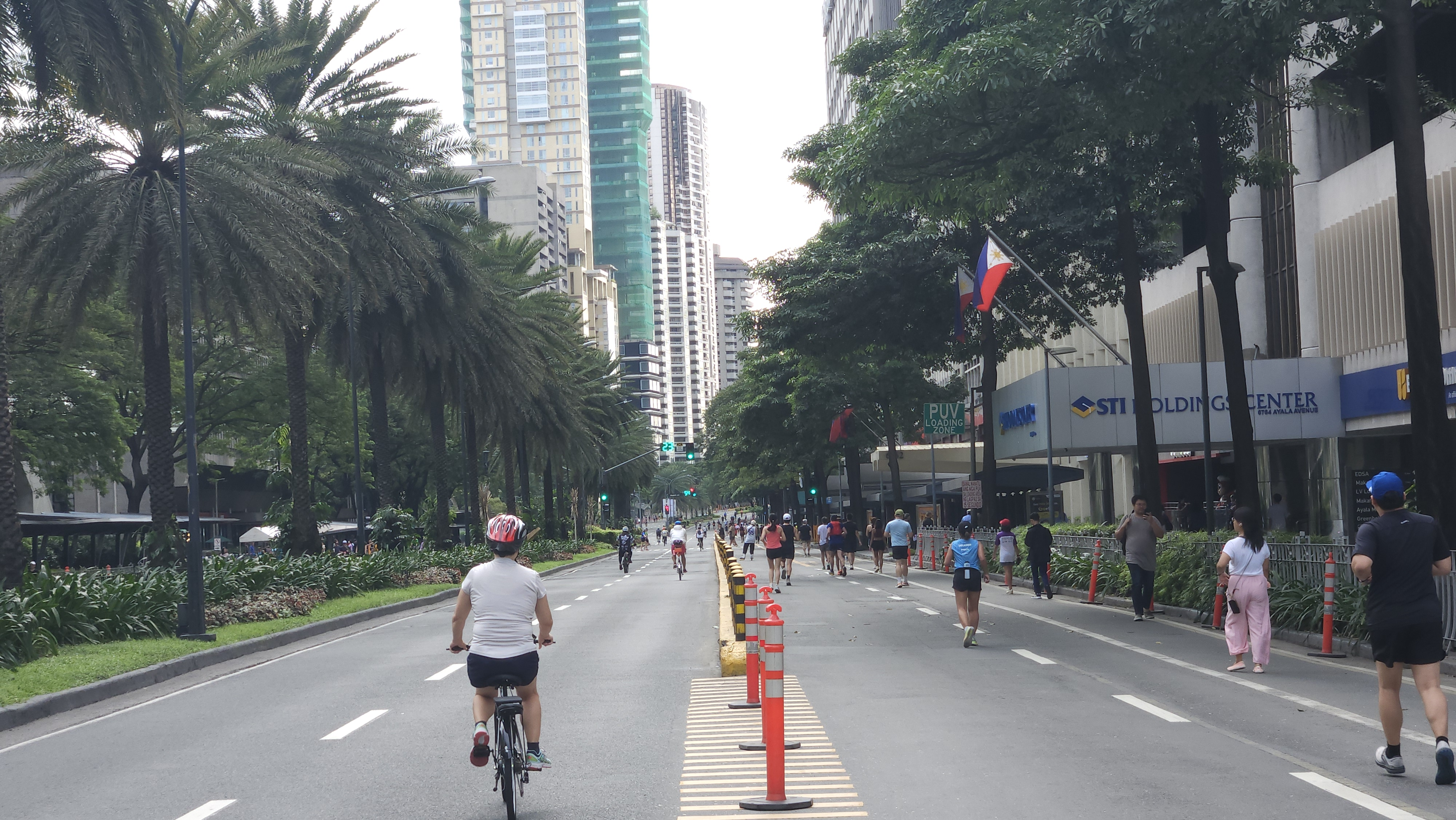
Car-Free Sundays

Since September 2023, sections of Ayala Avenue from Salcedo Street and H.V. Dela Costa Street to West Street and Fonda Street, along with portions of Paseo de Roxas and Makati Avenue within the vicinity of the Ayala Triangle Gardens, are closed to traffic every Sunday from 6:00 am to 10:00 am PHT. Branded as Car-Free Sundays, the car-free day initiative was launched by Ayala Land and the Makati City Government to promote cycling, jogging, and other recreational activities in a safer and more pedestrian-friendly environment.

=== New Year countdowns ===
Ayala Avenue in Makati has hosted significant New Year's Eve celebrations, beginning with the grand-scale street party to welcome the year 2000 and the new millennium. After a hiatus, the tradition resumed since the countdown to 2024.

=== Protests ===
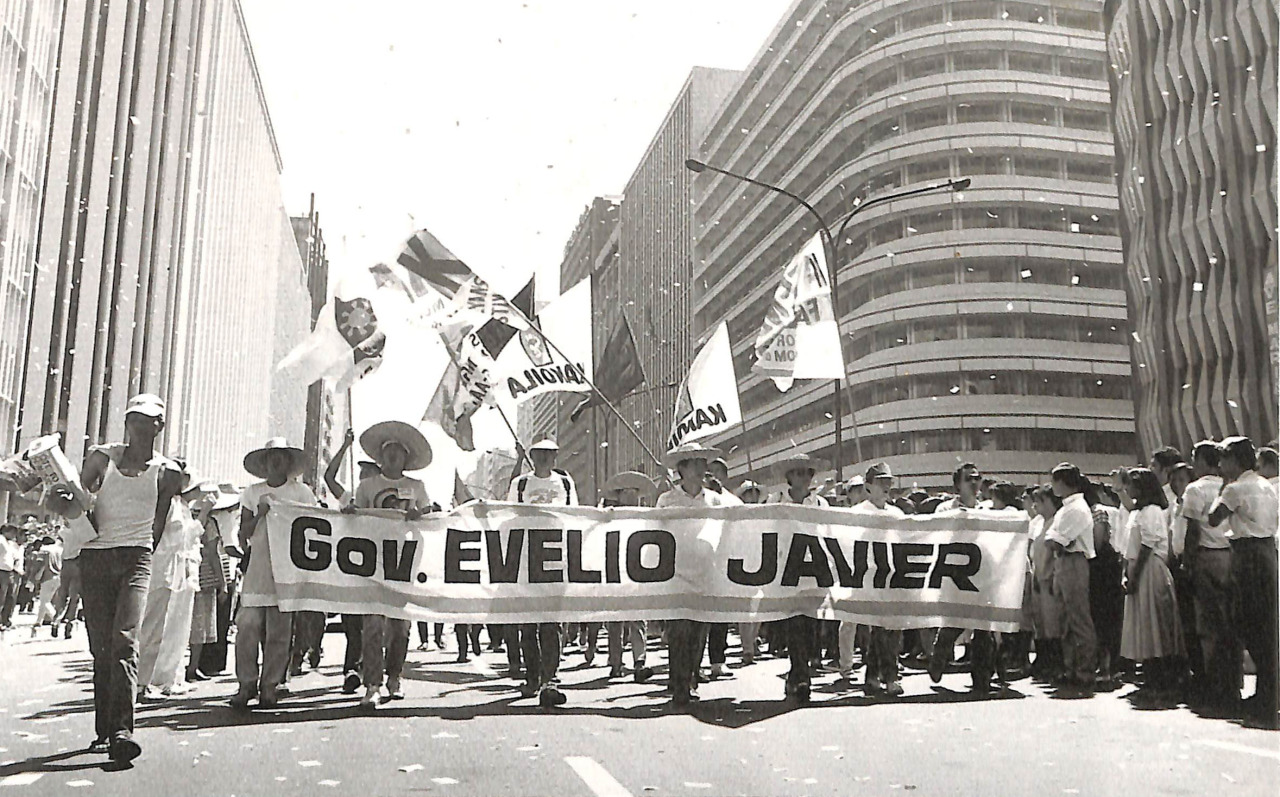
Protest on Ayala Avenue after the assassination of Evelio Javier that helped in the start of the People Power Revolution

Ayala Avenue has been a significant venue for demonstrations in the Philippines. Following the assassination of Ninoy Aquino in 1983, it became a focal point for protests against President Ferdinand Marcos, with office workers showing support by throwing yellow confetti torn from Yellow Pages of the PLDT directories, the color which had become associated with Aquino, from buildings above.

From August 2000 to January 2001, Ayala Avenue became the focal point for protests once again, this time against President Joseph Estrada, who later resigned upon being deposed during the Second EDSA Revolution. Protests continued to Estrada's successor, Gloria Macapagal Arroyo, with notable gatherings on July 13, 2005, demanding her resignation of Arroyo amid allegations of electoral fraud that led to her re-election in 2004, and in February 2008 against her administration.

On September 8, 2023, climate activists held a protest in front of the Ninoy Aquino Monument at the intersection of Ayala Avenue and Paseo de Roxas to urge, notably, G20 world leaders to shift from fossil fuels to renewable energy. On June 26, 2024, members of the Asian Peoples' Movement on Debt and Development held a protest calling for a halt to debt-related policies. The August Twenty-One Movement (ATOM), which was founded by Agapito Aquino in response to his brother Ninoy's assassination, also holds their Run/Ride On Against Revision (ROAR) initiative on the avenue every third (or fourth) Sunday of the month, coinciding with the Car-Free Sundays.

=== Political rallies ===
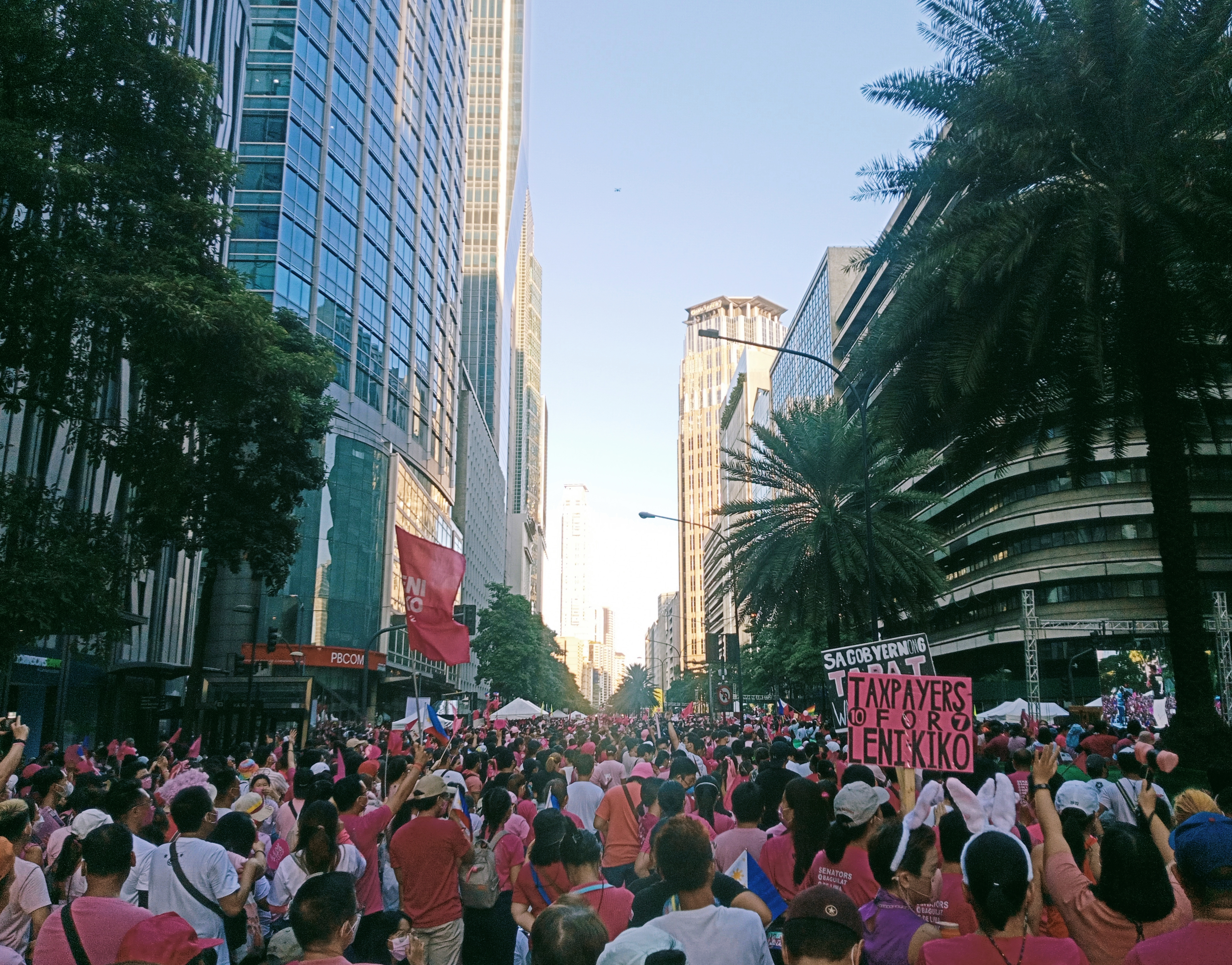
Leni Robredo miting de avance on Ayala Avenue on May 7, 2022

On May 7, 2022, Ayala Avenue became the site of Vice President Leni Robredo's final campaign rally (miting de avance) for her 2022 presidential campaign, attended by approximately 780,000 people.

== Intersections ==
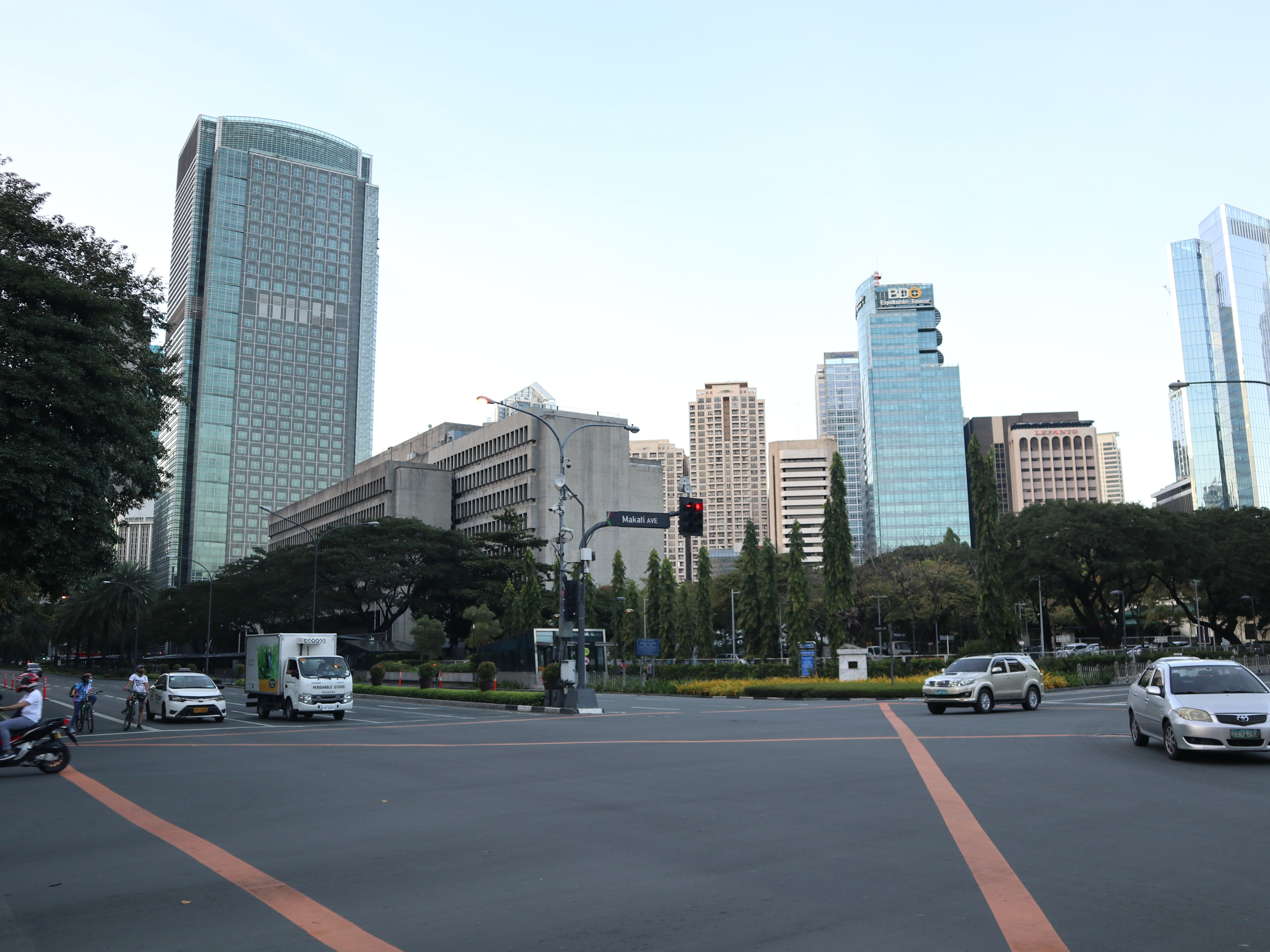
Intersection of Ayala and Makati Avenues

The entire route is located in Makati.

km	mi	Destinations	Notes
		AH26 (EDSA)	Southern terminus. Traffic light intersection. No left turn allowed. Continues south as McKinley Road.
		Recoletos Street	Northbound entrance and exit only. Restricted access to Urdaneta Village.
		Apartment Ridge Road	Northbound entrance and exit only.
		West end of Ayala-EDSA Flyover	
		East Street	Traffic light intersection. Northbound and southbound entrance only. Access to Glorietta complex.
		Courtyard Drive	Traffic light intersection. Exit from Ayala Avenue only. Access to Glorietta complex.
		Parkway Drive	Traffic light intersection. Access to Glorietta complex.
		West Street, Fonda Street	No access from opposite directions.
		Makati Avenue	Traffic light intersection.
		Paseo de Roxas	Traffic light intersection
		V.A. Rufino Street	Traffic light intersection. No left turn allowed from southbound.
		H.V. Dela Costa Street, Salcedo Street	Traffic light intersection.
		Amorsolo Street	Southbound entrance and exit only.
		N190 (Gil Puyat Avenue)	Traffic light intersection. No left turn allowed.
		Malugay Street	No access from opposite directions.
		Yakal Street	Former traffic light intersection.
		Kamagong Street	Traffic light intersection. No left turn allowed from northbound. Avenue becomes one-way northbound.
		Metropolitan Avenue	Traffic light intersection. Northern terminus. Continues north as South Avenue.
1.000 mi = 1.609 km; 1.000 km = 0.621 mi: Incomplete access

== See also ==
- Media related to Ayala Avenue at Wikimedia Commons
