= Makati pedestrian underpasses =

Pedestrian underpass in the Philippines

Makati CBD underpasses
- Pedestrian underpass network
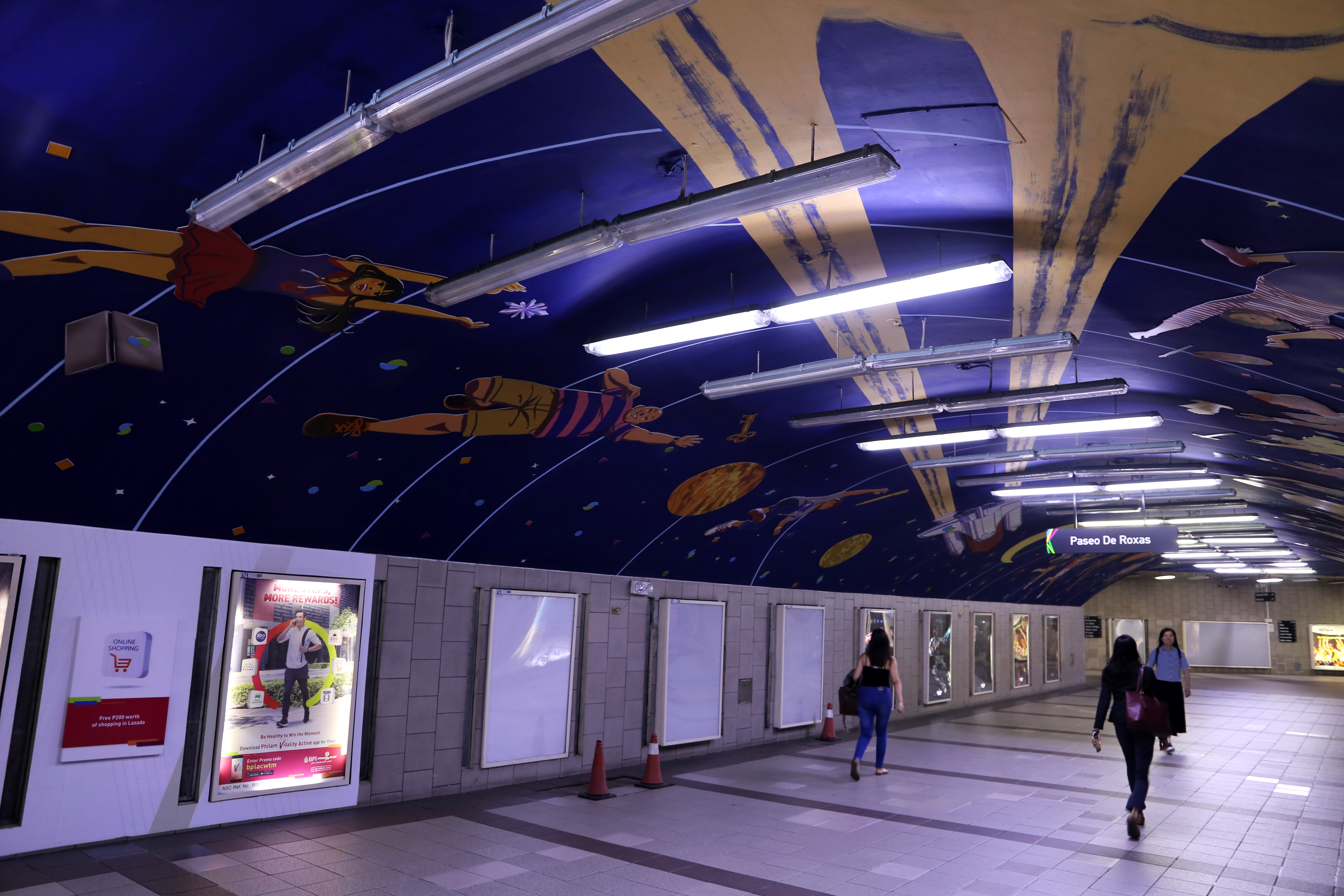
- Paseo De Roxas Underpass
- Opened: 1995 (first underpass)
- Owner: Makati Commercial Estate Association
- Location: Makati, Metro Manila, Philippines

The pedestrian underpasses of Makati in the Philippines are all located in the city's Central Business District (CBD). The underpasses are part of Makati's pedestrian walkway network which consist of underpasses, covered sidewalks, and elevated walkways.

== Background ==
Makati's underpasses were developed jointly by the Ayala Land, and its estate association, Makati Commercial Estates Association (MCEA). The first of these underpasses was the one in Legazpi Street, built in 1995. This was a response to the heavy traffic congestion in the 1990s.

The underpasses are also noted for its murals in its interiors.

== Summary ==
Makati pedestrian underpasses
1 Apartment Ridge
2 Legazpi
3 Makati Ave
4 Paseo De Roxas
5 Paseo–Villar
6 Salcedo
7 Sedeño
8 V.A. Rufino

Underpass	Coordinates	Notes	Image	Ref.
Apartment Ridge Underpass	14°33′12.2″N 121°01′35.1″E			
Legazpi Underpass	14°33′18.1″N 121°01′26.0″E	Built in 1995; connects Ayala Triangle Gardens and Ayala Center; has a mural depicting various flora and fauna of the Philippines		
Makati Ave Underpass	14°33′16.1″N 121°01′28.1″E			
Paseo De Roxas Underpass	14°33′24.4″N 121°01′16.6″E	Has a marine biodiversity-themed mural, a project of the Security Bank Foundation Inc.		
Paseo–Villar Underpass	14°33′29.6″N 121°01′30.7″E	Built from 2019–2021; connects the north side of Ayala Triangle Gardens to Salcedo Village.		
Salcedo Underpass	14°33′35.8″N 121°00′58.9″E	Features a mural paying homage to local heroes who left a positive impact in their communities.		
Sedeño Underpass	14°33′26.8″N 121°01′22.1″E			
V.A. Rufino Underpass	14°33′30.1″N 121°01′07.9″E			
