= Smart Communications =

Telecommunications company in the Philippines

Smart Communications Inc.
- Logo since 2016
- Type: Subsidiary
- Industry: Telecommunications; Remittance
- Predecessor: Sun Cellular (2003–2022)
- Founded: January 24, 1991; 35 years ago (in Manila, Philippines)
- Headquarters: Smart Tower, 6799 Ayala Avenue, Makati, Philippines
- Area served: Philippines
- Key people: Manuel V. Pangilinan (Chairman and Chief Executive Officer)
- Products: Mobile telephony
- Services: Broadband services Digital platform services
- Parent: PLDT
- Website: smart.com.ph

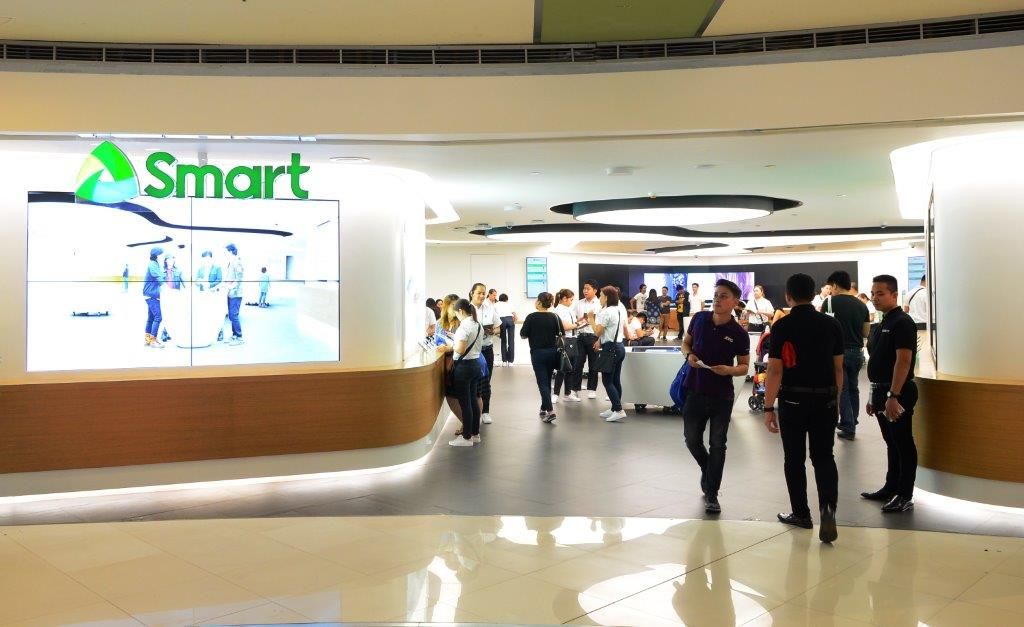
Smart Communications retail store in a mall.

Smart Communications Inc., commonly referred to as Smart, is a wholly owned wireless communications and digital services subsidiary of PLDT Inc., a telecommunications and digital services provider based in the Philippines. As of end of 2024, it has 59 million subscribers.

Smart offers commercial wireless services through its 2G, 3G, 3.5G HSPA+, 4G LTE, and LTE-A networks, with 5G currently being deployed in multiple locations in the Philippines. Smart's terrestrial wireless telephony service is being complemented by its satellite communication services Smart Sat and Marino which also serve the global maritime industry.

The company has introduced wireless offerings such as Smart Money, a mobile electronic wallet that also enables its SMS-based money remittance service Smart Padala (now integrated with Maya). It has also been recognized for introducing the world's first over-the-air electronic prepaid loading service called Smart Load. One of its services, PasaLoad, allows its users to pass phone credits to other Smart prepaid accounts through SMS.

== History ==
Anticipating the liberalization of the telecommunications industry in the Philippines a group of Filipino investors led by Orlando B. Vea and David T. Fernando organized Smart (then named Smart Information Technology, Inc.) on January 24, 1991. The company obtained its congressional franchise in April 1992 and was granted a provisional authority to operate a mobile cellular service in May 1993. In December 1993, Smart commenced commercial operations of its cellular service. By then, Smart had drawn in partners. These were: First Pacific, a Hong Kong–based conglomerate through its Philippine flagship Metro Pacific Corporation (MPC) and Nippon Telegraph and Telephone of Japan (NTT).

In compliance with the government's telecommunications program, Smart established a local exchange service in the cities and provinces assigned to it under the "service area scheme." The company also obtained licenses to provide international gateway, paging and inter-carrier transmission services.

On March 24, 2000, PLDT completed its share-swap acquisition of Smart, making Smart a 100%-owned PLDT subsidiary. In 2003, Smart was named the best employer in the Philippines in a study conducted by the firm Hewitt Associates.

In February 2011, Smart unveiled the Netphone, its own line of Android-compliant smartphones designed for emerging markets at the GSMA Mobile World Congress in Barcelona, Spain. The Netphone was introduced as the world's first smartphone backed by an operator-managed platform.

On August 25, 2012, Smart launched the Philippines' first 4G mobile broadband commercial service running on LTE technology. On April 13, 2016, Smart introduced the first commercial LTE-A Service in Boracay, Aklan.

On June 13, 2016, Smart and its parent company PLDT unveiled their new logos and identity as part of the company's continuing digital pivot.

In February 2017, Smart and parent company PLDT signed a memorandum of understanding with China-based Huawei Technologies "to shape the strategic and commercial development of the 5G ecosystem in the Philippines".

On April 21, 2017, Philippine President Rodrigo Duterte signed Republic Act No. 10926 which renewed Smart's license for another 25 years. The law granted Smart a franchise to establish, maintain, lease and operate integrated telecommunications, computers, electronics, and stations throughout the Philippines.

In October 2018, petitioners asked the Supreme Court to stop Globe and Smart from using the 700 MHz and Smart announced that they were working to fix its slow internet service. On July 30, 2020, Smart activated their 5G mobile network initially in Makati Central Business District, Bonifacio Global City, Araneta City, SM Megamall and SM Mall of Asia Bay Area.

In August 2025, Smart launched an app-based MVNO brand KiQ (pronounced as "kick").

== Subscribers ==
The company has more than 66 million mobile subscribers as of 2022, under the brands Smart, Sun, and TNT, in addition to wireless broadband subscribers number more than 3.9 million under the brands Smart Bro and Sun Wireless Broadband.

By virtue of SIM Registration Act and due to the deactivation of unregistered SIM cards, Smart has 50.0 million subscribers as of July 26, 2023.

As of November 2023, Smart reported that it has 55.2 million subscribers following the implementation of SIM card registration, which is slightly more than 54.7 million of close competitor Globe Telecom Inc., regaining its place as the mobile network with the largest subscriber base.

As of end of 2024, its subscriber base stands at 59 million.

== Radio frequency summary ==
Frequencies used by Smart Communications
Frequency	Protocol	Network	Band Number	Duplex Mode	Common name
900 MHz	GSM/GPRS/EDGE	2G	8	FDD	E-GSM
1800 MHz	GSM/GPRS/EDGE	2G	3	FDD	DCS
700 MHz	LTE/LTE-A/LTE-A Pro	4G	28	FDD	APT
850 MHz	LTE/LTE-A/LTE-A Pro	4G	5	FDD	CLR
1800 MHz	LTE/LTE-A/LTE-A Pro	4G	3	FDD	DCS
2100 MHz	LTE/LTE-A/LTE-A Pro	4G	1	FDD	IMT
2300 MHz	LTE/LTE-A/LTE-A Pro	4G	40	TDD	S-Band
2500 MHz	LTE/LTE-A/LTE-A Pro	4G	41	TDD	BRS
700 MHz	NR	5G	n28	FDD	APT
2500 MHz	NR	5G	n41	TDD	BRS
3500 MHz	NR	5G	n78	TDD	C-Band

== Esports ==
Smart and its parent company PLDT launched Smart Omega, a professional esports team for Dota 2, Mobile Legends: Bang Bang, and Tekken 7 that competed in the 2019 The Nationals. It is also a major sponsor of Mobile Legends: Bang Bang esports events in the Philippines such as the previous MSC 2019.

== Sports teams ==
- TNT Tropang 5G (PBA basketball team)
- Smart Giga Hitters (PSL women's volleyball team)

== Sponsorships ==
- FIBA (International Basketball Federation), since 2020, renewed until 2027
- KCON:TACT, since 2020
- Mnet Asian Music Awards, since 2020
- M Countdown, since 2021

== See also ==
- TNT (Smart's low-end cellular service)
- Sun Cellular (cellular service absorbed by Smart and is now defunct as of 2022)
- Smart Gilas (Philippine men's national basketball team)
- PLDT (Philippine Long Distance Telephone Company, Inc.)
