= LKG Tower =

- View of LKG Tower from Ayala Avenue
- Interactive map of the LKG Tower area

General information
- Status: Completed
- Type: Office
- Location: 6801 Ayala Avenue, Makati, Philippines
- Coordinates: 14°33′33.32″N 121°1′5.02″E
- Completed: 2000
- Opening: 2000
- Cost: US$ 55,000,000
- Owner: ICEC Land Corporation

Height
- Roof: 180.1 m (590.88 ft)

Technical details
- Floor count: 38 aboveground, 5 belowground
- Floor area: 66,810 m^{2} (719,136.85 sq ft)

Design and construction
- Architects: Kohn Pedersen Fox Associates, Recio + Casas Architects
- Developer: ICEC Land Corporation
- Structural engineer: Aromin & Sy + Associates, Inc.
- Main contractor: D.M. Consunji, Inc.

The LKG Tower is an office skyscraper located in Makati, Philippines, and is one of the tallest in the city. Standing at 180.1 metres (590.88 feet), the building has 38 floors above ground, and 5 basement levels for parking.

The LKG Tower is owned by International Copra Export Corporation (ICEC) Land Corporation, and was designed by architectural firm Kohn Pedersen Fox Associates, in cooperation with local firm Recio + Casas Architects. Its upper part has a distinctive shape emphasized by the presence of its "ribbon" design that cuts diagonally through its facade.
