= Basketball TV =

Defunct Philippine cable sports television channel

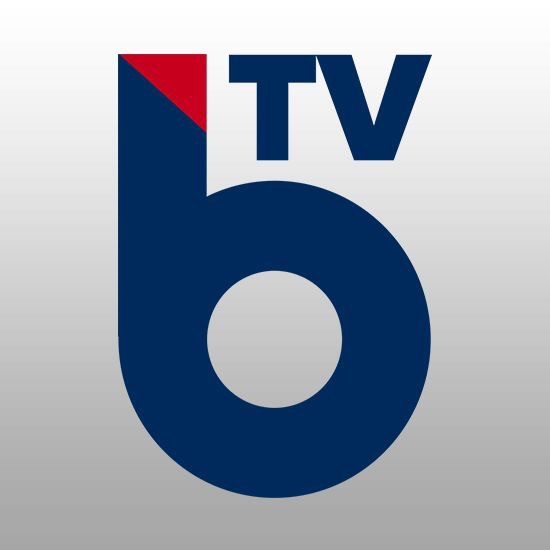
- Type: Cable and satellite television network
- Country: Philippines
- Headquarters: Mandaluyong, Metro Manila, Philippines

Programming
- Languages: English (main); Filipino (secondary)
- Picture format: 480i SDTV

Ownership
- Owner: Solar Entertainment Corporation
- Sister channels: ETC; Shop TV; Jack TV; NBA Premium TV; Solar Sports

History
- Launched: October 1, 2006; 19 years ago
- Closed: October 1, 2019; 6 years ago
- Replaced by: NBA TV Philippines (Cignal TV)

Basketball TV (BTV) was a Philippine pay television sports channel with offices on Shaw Boulevard, Mandaluyong. It was owned by the Solar Entertainment Corporation. It was launched on October 1, 2006, rebranding the Sports Plus channel. On September 25, 2019, it announced on its official Facebook page as well as on its Instagram and Twitter accounts that the channel and NBA Premium TV will cease their operations on October 1, 2019. The final program to air on this channel was a replay of NBA Playoff Playback on September 30, 2019, before signing off at 12:00 midnight on October 1, 2019.

Upon the channel's termination, Sky Cable and Cignal in their joint statement said that they were jointly negotiating directly with the NBA to make games and programming available to millions of fans in the Philippines. “We have submitted an offer to the NBA and are awaiting a response.”

== History ==
The channel focused on NBA TV-related programs and also regular NBA games. In its initial broadcasts, it was showing re-runs of the 2006 NCAA Division I men's basketball tournament and the 2006 FIBA World Championship. It also covered the Philippine Collegiate Champions League (PCCL), National Capital Region Athletic Association (NCRAA), National Basketball League (NBL) and National Basketball Conference (NBC) games.

A supplementary channel, NBA Premium TV (now defunct), was launched in time for the 2010–11 NBA season, featuring over 400 games with no local commercials.

On April 10, 2017, Sky Cable, Destiny Cable & Sky Direct dropped Basketball TV along with NBA Premium TV, Jack TV, Solar Sports & CT (now defunct) allegedly due to Sky Cable's unpaid carriage fees. However, on October 16, 2018, the channel was restored on Sky Cable & Sky Direct after 18 months of carriage disputes. On October 28, 2018, the channel was dropped again on Sky Cable & Sky Direct.

The channel ceased operations on October 1, 2019, after 13 years of broadcasting.

== Final programming ==
=== NBA ===
- NBA Action*
- NBA.com Fantasy Insider*
- NBA Inside Stuff*
- NBA Gametime Live
- NBA Games
- Real NBA*
- The Beat*
- The Starters*
- Inside the NBA*
- The Jump on NBA.com*
- NBA D-League Central*
- NBA D-League Game of the Week*
- WNBA Games
- WNBA Action**
- NBA Playoffs Playback
- NBA Summer League
- NBA draft
- One on One with Ahmad Rashad
- Open Court
- Hardwood Classics
- NBA Marquee Match-up
- NBA Playoff Playback
- Making the Call with Ronnie Nunn
- NBA Draft Playback
- Sounds of the Finals
- The Run
- Overtime
- NBA Stories
- Marv Albert Show
- NBA Greatest Games / Hardwood Classics
- NBA Home Video
- NBA Basketballography
- NBA Specials
- Vintage NBA
- NBA Vault
- NBA Wired
- Books and Basketball
- NBA Journeys
- NBA Presents
- NBA Fit
- NBA Slideshow
- NBA Jam (local or original version)
- NBA Access with Ahmad Rashad
- NBA 360
- NBA Hoop Party
- NBA TV Top 10 Games of the Week
- Real Training Camp

=== FIBA ===
- 2008 Beijing Olympics
- 2012 London Olympics
- Stankovic Cup
- FIBA Diamond Ball
- FIBA World Basketball*
- FIBA World Championship
- FIBA Asia Championship
- FIBA Americas Championship
- EuroBasket

[*] – Also currently airing on Solar Sports

=== College ===
- ACC men's basketball tournament
- NCAA Division I men's basketball tournament
- Philippine Collegiate Championship (2017)
- One U

[*] – Broadcast rights moved to ABS-CBN Sports through ABS-CBN Sports+Action.

=== Local leagues ===
- Philippine Basketball League (2007–2010)
- Nike Elite Camp
- Fil-Oil / Flying V Invitational Cup (2006)
- Philippine Basketball Association (2008–2011)
- Philippine Women Basketball League (2008)
- Liga Pilipinas (2009–2011)
- ASEAN Basketball League (2010–2011)

=== Other foreign leagues ===
- Euroleague (briefly moved to ESPN Star Sports in the 2009–10 season)
- National Basketball League
- Chinese Basketball Association
- Liga ACB

=== Other ===
- Home Shopping Network (2006–11, 2014–15)
- Shop TV (2015–19)

== See also ==
- Solar Entertainment Corporation, official broadcasting
- Solar Sports, Basketball TV sister channel
- NBA Premium TV, Basketball TV sister channel
- PBA Rush
- NBA TV Philippines
