= NBA Action =

- Presented by: See Hosts
- Country of origin: United States
- No. of episodes: n/a (airs weekly)

Production
- Running time: 30 minutes/1 hour
- Production company: NBA Entertainment

Original release
- Network: ESPN (1990-present); Fox Sports Networks/Bally Sports (1998-present); NBC Sports Regional Networks (1998-present); Setanta Sports (1999-present); NBA TV (2003-present); CBS Sports Network (2013-present)
- Release: 1990 – present

NBA Action is a weekly show with news and highlights of the NBA. The show premiered in 1990 on ESPN. It airs on NBA TV with new episodes at 6:30 ET/5:30 CT every Thursday night during the season.

== Features (not in chronological order) ==
- Western Conference Team of the Week
- Instant replay (weekly NBA News)
- Timeout (Player Features)
- Eastern Conference Team of the Week
- Encore (showcasing the best plays during the week that didn't make the Courtside Countdown including buzzer beaters, long range shots, alley oops, assists, dunks, circus shots, blocks)
- Spotlight (special features on players, teams or great moments in the NBA)
- Sounds of the Game
- Courtside Countdown (showcasing the Top 10 Plays, Dunks, Buzzer Beaters, Assists and Blocks during the week)

== Hosts ==
- Jim Fagan (1990–2004)
- Spero Dedes (2004–2005)
- Ian Eagle (2005–present)
- Rich Ackerman (2003–2026; occasional host)

== Video games ==
There was a series of video games released by Sega Sports for the Sega Genesis, Sega Game Gear and Sega Saturn with the name NBA Action.

- NBA Action '94 (Genesis)
- NBA Action '95 (Game Gear and Genesis)
- NBA Action (1996) (Saturn)
- NBA Action 98 (Saturn and PC)

== International broadcasts ==
By region

=== Latin America ===
- ESPN
- Fox Sports
- BeIN Sports
- DIRECTV Sports
- Telecanal Plus (Argentina) Saturday at 02:00 pm
- TV CABLE (Ecuador)
- TVC Deportes (México) Friday at 11:00 pm
- Unicanal Plus (Paraguay) Saturday at 02:00 pm
- Telecable TV (Peru) Sunday at 07:00 pm
- VTV Plus (Uruguay) Saturday at 02:00 pm
- Meridiano TV (Venezuela) Sunday at 08:00 pm
- Canal 4 (El Salvador) (Voice-over translation) Thursday at 07:00 pm

=== Brazil ===
- ESPN
- Fox Sports
- Rede Record (Sunday at 11:30 pm in Free TV)

=== Philippines ===
- ABS-CBN (2018)
- Basketball TV (2006–2019)
- GMA Network (1988–1996)
- IBC (1996–2001, 2002–2004)
- NBA Premium TV (2010–2019)
- NBN (2001–2002)
- S+A (2014–2019)
- Solar TV (2009–2011)
- Studio 23 (2011–2013)

=== Europe ===
- Sky Sports (United Kingdom/Ireland)
- Sky Sport (Italy)
- C More/TV4 (Sweden) Airs in news and documentary orientated sports channel Sportkanalen
- TV 2 (Denmark)
- Canal+ Premium (Poland)
- ESPN (The Netherlands)
- SportTv (Hungary)
