= Spero Dedes =

American sportscaster (born 1979)

- Born: February 27, 1979 (age 47); Paramus, New Jersey, U.S.
- Occupations: Sportscaster, play-by-play announcer
- Years active: 2001–present

Spero Dedes (SPEAR-row DEE-des; born February 27, 1979) is an American sportscaster. He is currently employed by CBS Sports, calling the NFL and college basketball games, and TNT Sports, calling NBA and college basketball games. He has previously worked as the preseason TV voice of the Los Angeles Chargers (2015–2021), a radio and television play-by-play announcer for the New York Knicks (2011–2014), and the radio play-by-play announcer for the Los Angeles Lakers (2005–2011).

== Early career ==
Dedes was born in Paramus, New Jersey. He attended Paramus High School and then graduated from Fordham University in 2001 and he began his career at WFAN in New York.

In 2001 and 2002, Dedes was the radio announcer for the New Jersey Gladiators of the AFL. In 2002, he was tapped as a fill-in announcer for New Jersey Nets games on the YES Network.

In 2003, Dedes was hired as a studio host and play-by-play man for NBA TV. He hosted Hardwood Classics and The Insiders.

In 2004, Dedes was hired as a voice over for NBA Action and replaced longtime voice over Jim Fagan until he was replaced by YES Network play–by–play announcer Ian Eagle.

== National exposure ==
At 24, Dedes worked the 2004 Summer Olympics for NBC Sports.

In 2004, Dedes also served as a fill-in commentator of College Basketball on CBS. Also in 2004, Dedes served as a fill-in commentator for the NFL on FOX.

In 2005, Dedes filled in on the NFL on CBS. In the same year, Dedes got the biggest break of his career when he was hired as the radio announcer for the Los Angeles Lakers.

From 2006 until 2011, Dedes worked for NFL Network, with his duties including studio hosting and play-by-play. In 2015, Dedes went back to his old stomping grounds, returning to NFL Network as a studio host.

In 2007, Dedes served as the play-by-play man for the international feed of Super Bowl XLI by CBS Sports. In 2023 Dedes worked as a Play by play man for select NFL games on Westwood One.

=== Full-time at CBS and New York Knicks ===
In December 2009, Dedes joined CBS Sports full-time, calling regular season college basketball and the 2010 NCAA Tournament.

For the 2010 NFL season, he was named a full-time announcer of the NFL on CBS.

In 2011, Dedes left the Lakers and became the radio voice of the New York Knicks. Dedes cited the flexibility to continue his work at CBS Sports as the reason for leaving the Lakers.

In addition, that fall, he became the #2 voice of the SEC on CBS behind Verne Lundquist.

Dedes has also filled in for Ian Eagle on play-by-play for New York Jets preseason games on WCBS-TV.

From 2017 to 2021 and since 2023, he called NFL games with Adam Archuleta and for the 2021 and 2022 seasons was paired with Jay Feely. Dedes and Archuleta serve as the No. 5 announcing team for the NFL on CBS. Dedes and Archuleta were on the call for the Snow Bowl where the Buffalo Bills beat the Indianapolis Colts on December 10, 2017. He's also the No. 4 play-by-play announcer for the NBA on TNT and continues to work play-by-play on CBS and Turner's coverage of NCAA March Madness pairing with an array of analysts including Steve Smith, Jim Jackson, Len Elmore, Debbie Antonelli and Jim Spanarkel.
