= NBA Premium TV =

Defunct television channel in the Philippines

- Country: Philippines
- Network: NBA TV

Programming
- Language: English
- Picture format: 480i SDTV

Ownership
- Owner: Solar Entertainment Corporation
- Sister channels: ETC; Shop TV; Jack TV; Solar Sports; Basketball TV

History
- Launched: October 16, 2010
- Closed: October 1, 2019
- Replaced by: Solar Sports (Solar Entertainment Corporation); NBA TV Philippines (Cignal TV)

NBA Premium TV was a Philippine pay television sports-oriented network owned by Solar Entertainment Corporation. The channel was a joint venture between Solar and NBA TV. It was a live simulcast broadcast of NBA TV, the league's dedicated channel in the United States.

On September 25, 2019, it was announced on the official Facebook page of Basketball TV (BTV) as well as on its Instagram and Twitter accounts that the channel and BTV will cease their operations on October 1, 2019. The final program to air on this channel was a replay of NBA Playoff Playback on September 30, 2019, before signing off at 12:10 a.m. on October 1, 2019.

Upon the channel's termination, Sky Cable and Cignal in their joint statement said that they were jointly negotiating directly with the NBA to make games and programming available to millions of fans in the Philippines, “We have submitted an offer to the NBA and are awaiting a response.” 10 months later, NBA awarded the broadcast rights of its games to Cignal and its sister stations TV5 and One Sports, with Cignal launching its own channel NBA TV Philippines on July 31, 2020.

== Features ==
NBA Premium TV logo used from 2010 to 2017

NBA Premium was the sister channel of Basketball TV (now defunct, same day as NBA Premium), but the channel aired more games and NBA-content than its sister channel or ABS-CBN (Free TV partner). Since it was also a re-direct broadcast of NBA TV, there were no local commercial insertions and only aired commercials coming from the US feed and during some NBA games were not to be televised on NBA TV, it used local advertisements and few from the US advertisements. The channel was only dedicated to NBA programs. The channel also retained commentary from US broadcast during the NBA Finals, and also a direct re-broadcast from ABC/ESPN, while BTV and ABS-CBN used the world feed and local commentary, respectively. The channel also aired NBA-related programming during off-season like WNBA games on pre-season games.

== History ==
On April 10, 2017, Sky Cable, Destiny Cable & Sky Direct dropped NBA Premium TV along with Basketball TV, Jack TV, Solar Sports & CT (now defunct) allegedly due to Sky Cable's unpaid carriage fees. However, on October 16, 2018, the channel was restored on Sky Cable & Sky Direct after 18 months of carriage disputes. On October 28, 2018, the channel was dropped again on Sky Cable & Sky Direct. On January 1, 2019, the channel was restored again on Sky Cable and Sky Direct.

== Final programming ==
=== Season ===
- NBA Regular Season/Post-season Games
- Pre-game and Post game shows
- Inside the NBA
- NBA Action
- Fantasy Insider
- The Beat
- The Jump
- NBA TV Marquee Match-up of the week
- NBA Gametime Live
- NBA All-Star Game
- NBA Mid-season Report Card
- NBA Special
- Playoff Playback

=== Off season ===
- NBA Greatest Games
- Hardwood Classics
- NBA Top Games of the Year
- NBA Courtside Cinema
- Old School Monday
- WNBA Regular Season/Play off Games
- WNBA Action
- Championship Clinchers
- Team USA exhibition games
- NBA draft
- Summer League Games
- Training Camp

== See also ==
- Basketball TV, NBA Premium TV's sister channel
- Solar Sports, NBA Premium TV's sister channel
- NBA TV Philippines, NBA Premium TV's replacement
- NBA League Pass, NBA's global streaming service
