= NBA on television =

The current NBA broadcasters (ESPN/ABC, NBC/Peacock and Amazon Prime Video), arranged in order by the year each network began their broadcasts. (Note: This is arranged by the current iterations. ESPN previously aired from 1982 to 1984, ABC from 1965 to 1973 and NBC from 1954 to 1962 and again from 1990 to 2002.)

National Basketball Association (NBA) games are televised nationally in the United States, as well as on multiple local channels and regional sports networks.

The 2025–26 season marks the first year of 11-year agreements with broadcast channels ABC and NBC, pay television network ESPN, and streaming services Peacock and Amazon Prime Video to nationally televise games in the United States. Under these contracts, ESPN shows doubleheaders on Wednesday nights, and Amazon Prime Video streams games on Friday nights for most of the season. NBC airs a Tuesday night doubleheader to be shown across different NBC stations (under the branding Coast 2 Coast Tuesday). The first is scheduled at 8 p.m. Eastern Time (on NBC stations using Eastern and Central Time Zones) and a second game is scheduled at 8 p.m. Pacific Time (on stations using Mountain and Pacific Time Zones). In addition to streaming all games broadcast by NBC, Peacock also streams at least one game exclusively on the streamer (under the branding Peacock NBA Monday), which is also simulcasted on NBCSN. During the second half of the season, ABC shows a single game on Saturday nights and a doubleheader on Sunday afternoons, whereas Prime Video streams Thursday night games and NBC airs Sunday night games (under the branding Sunday Night Basketball). Prime Video also streams selected Saturday afternoon games, while ESPN airs games on selected Friday nights. There are some exceptions to this schedule, including Tip-off Week, Christmas Day, and Martin Luther King Jr. Day. More games may be shown as the end of the regular season approaches, particularly games with playoff significance. Coverage of the first two rounds is split between ABC/ESPN, NBC/Peacock, and Amazon Prime Video, while the conference finals alternates between these platforms every year. The entire NBA Finals is shown nationally on ABC. The NBA Finals is one of the few sporting events to be shown on a national broadcast network on a weeknight.

Games not televised by its national partners are instead broadcast by local broadcast stations and regional sports networks, televising their respective local team within their respective region. A number of nationally televised games are also non-exclusive, meaning that the national telecasts may also air in tandem with those of the game by local broadcasters. With the Toronto Raptors being the only NBA team in Canada, television rights differ in that country. Games exclusively televised south of the border by an American national broadcast network may be simulcast by a Canadian network, but all contests involving the Raptors are non-exclusive north of the border.

In addition to the English-language television broadcasts, select NBA games also have Spanish-language broadcasts since 2002.

== History ==
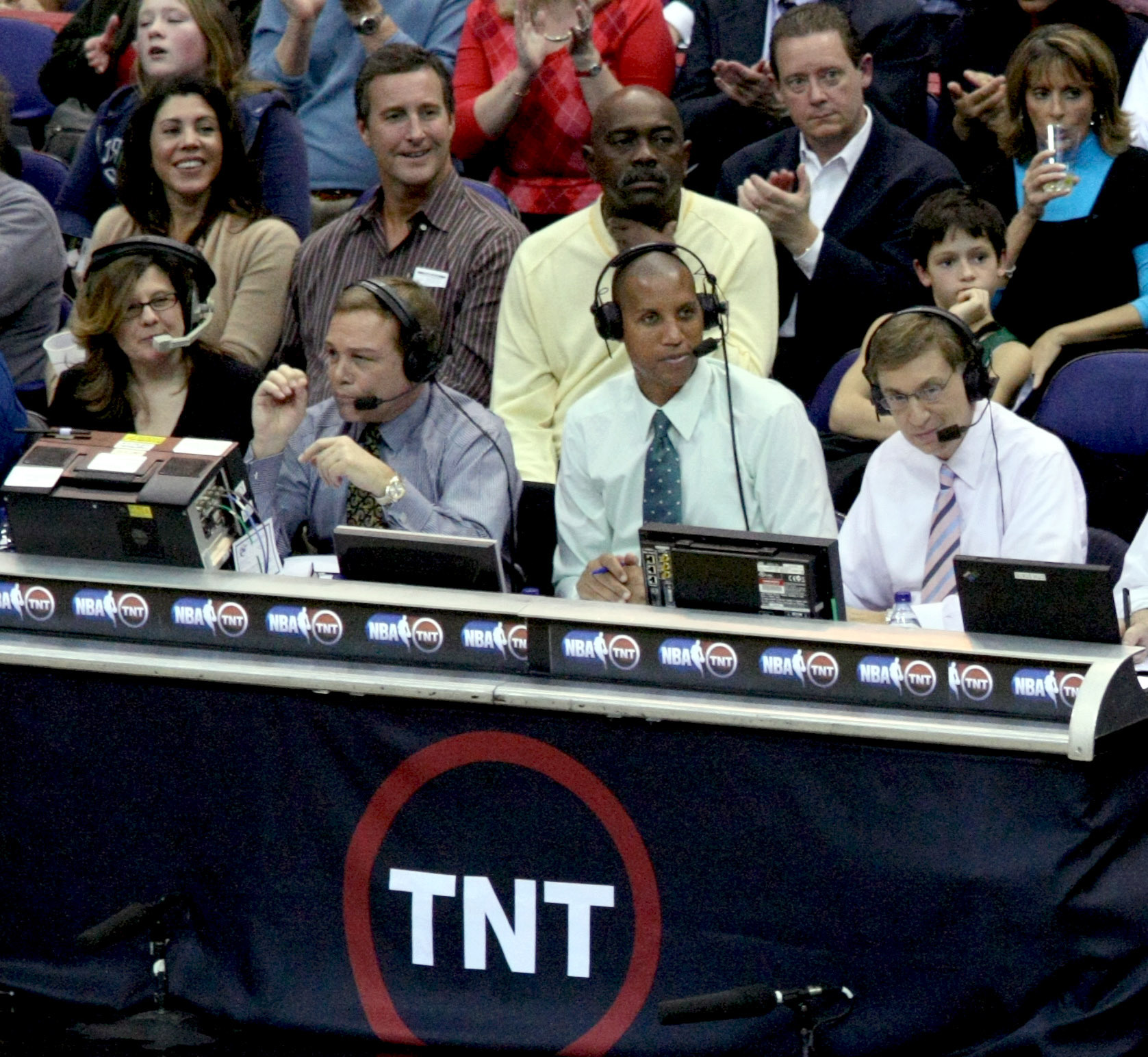
Mike Fratello (left), Reggie Miller (middle) and Marv Albert (right) calling an NBA game for TNT Sports in 2008. TNT aired NBA games from 1989 to 2025.

As one of the major sports leagues in North America, the National Basketball Association has a long history of partnership with television networks in the United States. The league signed a contract with DuMont in its 8th season (1953–54), marking the first year the NBA had a national television broadcaster. Similar to NFL, the lack of television stations led to NBC taking over the rights beginning the very next season until April 7, 1962—NBC's first tenure with the NBA. After the deal expired, Sports Network Incorporated (later known as the Hughes Television Network) signed up for two-year coverage in the 1962–63 and 1963–64 season.

ABC then gained the NBA in 1964, airing its first NBA game on January 3, 1965. Up until the 1970–71 season, ABC often aired NBA games as segments of its popular ABC's Wide World of Sports anthology series rather than standalone broadcasts.

CBS took over national rights from ABC in 1973. The late 1970s and early 1980s was notoriously known as the "tape delay playoff era". Ratings sagged in the late 1970s with a series of fairly undistinguished championship teams from relatively small markets, widespread public perceptions of drug usage among players, and a relative lack of marquee players. Even a merger with the American Basketball Association in 1976, bringing several standout players including Julius Erving into the league, did not reverse the ratings slide. CBS, not wishing to preempt higher-rated regular programming for the relatively low-rated pro basketball, elected to show several playoff games each season tape-delayed into late-night time slots. This situation started to improve with the arrival of Earvin "Magic" Johnson and Larry Bird for the 1979-80 season, but both the 1980 and 1981 NBA Finals (which were won by teams led by first Magic, and then Bird) had games air late at night on tape delay, most infamous with the 1980 Finals' Game 6, where Magic (tasked to play center after an injury to Kareem Abdul-Jabbar) had 42 points in a title-clinching win that wasn't aired live outside of Philadelphia or Los Angeles. Beginning with the 1982 NBA Finals, the schedule was shifted to avoid the May television sweeps period, and tape-delayed games were no longer an issue.

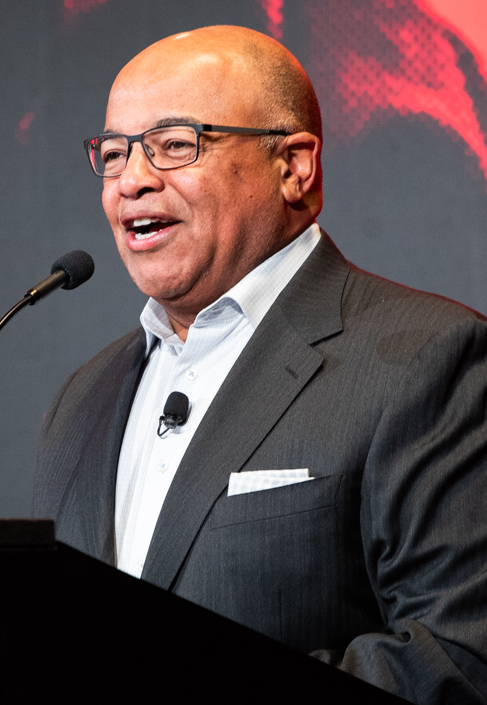
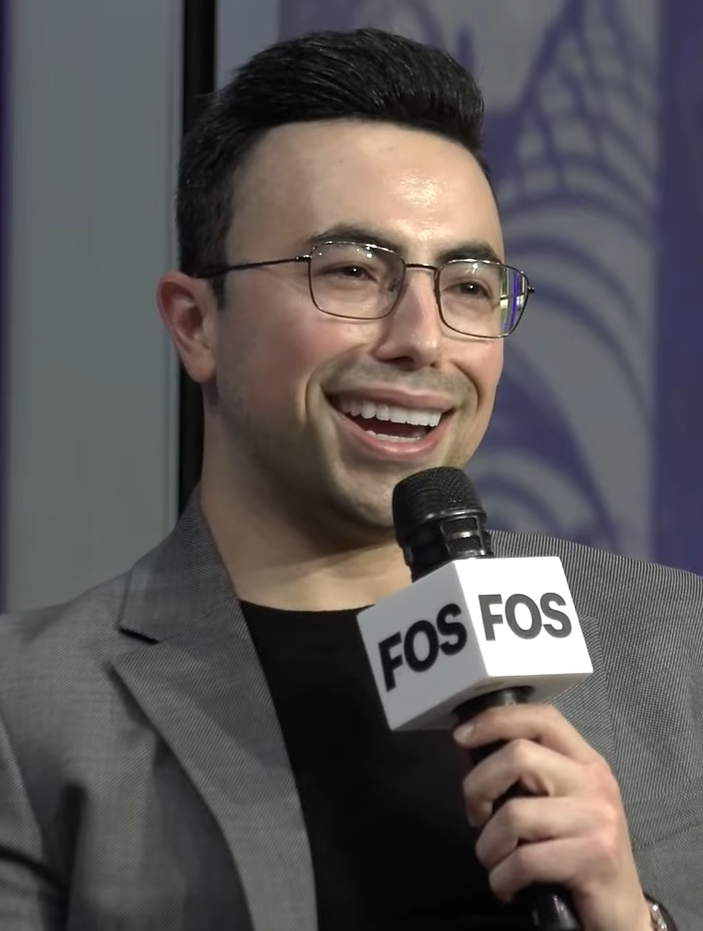
Mike Tirico (left) and Noah Eagle (right), play-by-play announcers of the NBA on NBC since 2025.

The NBA entered the cable territory in 1979 when USA Network signed a three-year $1.5 million deal and extended for two years until the 1983–84 season, ESPN also had a brief affair with the NBA from 1982 to 1984. Turner Sports then replaced ESPN and USA Network as national cable partners under a four-year deal beginning with the 1984-85 season, in which TBS shared the NBA television package along with CBS. In the summer of 1987, Turner signed a new joint broadcast contract between TBS and TNT to split broadcast NBA games starting from the 1988-89 season. TNT held rights to broadcast the NBA draft, most NBA regular season and playoff games, while TBS only aired single games or doubleheaders once a week.

In 1990, NBC took over the broadcast rights from CBS. During NBC's partnership with the NBA in the 1990s, the league rose to unprecedented popularity, with ratings surpassing the days of Johnson and Bird in the mid-1980s.

Upon expiration of the contracts in 2002, the NBA signed a six-year, $2.4 billion ($400 million/year) deal with Disney-owned ABC and ESPN. ABC took over the package from NBC, and ESPN took over part of the cable rights from TBS. NBC had made a four-year $1.3 billion ($330 million/year) offer in the spring of 2002 to renew its rights, but the NBA passed and opted for ABC/ESPN's higher bid. Turner was able to keep a package for TNT. And while TBS would initially discontinue game coverage altogether, it would serve as TNT's overflow feed during the playoffs while also simulcasting games like the 2015, 2016, and 2017 NBA All-Star Game. The combined total of ABC, ESPN, and TNT's 2002 agreements became $4.6 billion ($766 million/year). Partially due to the retirement of Michael Jordan after the 2002–03 season, the league suffered a ratings decline. The NBA extended its national television package on June 27, 2007, worth eight-year $7.4 billion ($930 million/year) through the 2015–16 season, during which the league had its new resurgence leading by a renewed Celtics–Lakers rivalry and LeBron James. On October 6, 2014, the NBA announced a nine-year $24 billion ($2.7 billion/year) extension with ABC, ESPN, and Turner beginning with the 2016–17 season and running through the 2024–25 season - the second most expensive media rights in the world after NFL and on a par with Premier League in annual rights fee from 2016–17 to 2018–19 season.

On July 24, 2024, the NBA announced new 11-year agreements with ABC/ESPN, NBC/Peacock, and Amazon Prime Video that will last from the 2025–26 to 2035–36 seasons. The new agreements ended a near 36-year domestic broadcast run with TNT Sports; parent company Warner Bros. Discovery and the NBA would later agree to a legal settlement, which included live game rights for select international territories and sublicensing its pregame, halftime, and postgame show Inside the NBA to ESPN and ABC.

== Regular season ==
Average rating per regular season game on broadcast networks (1989–present)
Season	Network	Rating
2024–25	ABC	1.4
2023–24	ABC	1.4
2022–23	ABC	1.4
2021–22	ABC	1.6
2020–21	ABC	1.5
2019–20	ABC	1.8
2018–19	ABC	2.2
2017–18	ABC	2.2
2016–17	ABC	1.9
2015–16	ABC	2.3
2014–15	ABC	2.2
2013–14	ABC	2.3
2012–13	ABC	2.9
2011–12 (Lockout Shortened)	ABC	3.3
2010–11	ABC	3.0
2009–10	ABC	2.3
2008–09	ABC	2.3
2007–08	ABC	2.2
2006–07	ABC	2.0
2005–06	ABC	2.2
2004–05	ABC	2.3
2003–04	ABC	2.4
2002–03	ABC	2.6
2001–02	NBC	2.9
2000–01	NBC	3.0
1999–2000	NBC	3.3
1998–99 (lockout shortened)	NBC	4.3
1997–98	NBC	4.8
1996–97	NBC	4.7
1995–96	NBC	5.0
1994–95	NBC	5.1
1993–94	NBC	4.6
1992–93	NBC	5.0
1991–92	NBC	4.8
1990–91	NBC	4.7
1989–90	CBS	5.2

Average viewership per regular season game in millions by networks (2007–present)
Season	ABC	TNT	ESPN	NBA TV
2017–18	3.82M	1.74M	1.63M	0.31M
2016–17	3.27M	1.54M	1.57M	0.31M
2015–16	3.93M	1.68M	1.65M	0.35M
2014–15	3.59M	1.67M	1.50M	0.29M
2013–14	3.58M	1.90M	1.68M	0.32M
2012–13	4.70M	2.00M	1.77M	0.34M
2011–12 (lockout shortened)	5.42M	2.50M	1.86M	0.34M
2010–11	5.11M	2.40M	1.99M	0.25M
2009–10	3.69M	1.72M	1.56M	---
2008–09	3.68M	1.71M	1.68M	---
2007–08	3.18M	1.47M	1.47M	---

== NBA playoffs ==
Since the 2026 playoffs, ABC/ESPN broadcasts about 18 games in the first two rounds each year, NBC Sports has between 22 and 34 first and second-round games, either televised on NBC or streamed on Peacock, and Amazon Prime Video streams between 14 and 26 first- and second-round games. For the conference finals, ABC/ESPN has one series in the first 10 years of the deal, while the other series would be rotated between NBC and Prime Video; in 2036 (the final year of the deal), NBC and Amazon will have the conference finals instead of ABC/ESPN. ABC will continue to exclusively broadcast the NBA Finals, which, dating back to 2003, would extend the network's consecutive streak of airing the series to over 30 years. The entirety of the playoffs, including the first round and the play-in tournament, are exclusive to the NBA's national TV partners; no local broadcaster is allowed to produce its own broadcast of playoff games, as had been allowed before 2026.

Most watched NBA playoff games on cable networks
Year	Network	Game	Rating	Viewership
2016	TNT	Oklahoma City Thunder vs Golden State Warriors WCF Game 7	8.9	16.00M
2012	ESPN	Boston Celtics vs Miami Heat ECF Game 7	7.7	13.35M
2013	TNT	Indiana Pacers vs Miami Heat ECF Game 7	7.1	11.57M
2011	TNT	Miami Heat vs Chicago Bulls ECF Game 1	6.2	11.11M
2012	ESPN	Miami Heat vs Boston Celtics ECF Game 6	6.8	11.07M
2012	ESPN	Miami Heat vs Boston Celtics ECF Game 4	6.8	11.07M
2011	TNT	Chicago Bulls vs Miami Heat ECF Game 3	6.4	10.89M
2016	TNT	Golden State Warriors vs Oklahoma City Thunder WCF Game 6	6.2	10.81M
2011	TNT	Miami Heat vs Chicago Bulls ECF Game 5	6.4	10.41M
2012	ESPN	Boston Celtics vs Miami Heat ECF Game 5	6.3	10.25M

== NBA Finals ==
ABC has exclusively aired the NBA Finals since 2003, and will continue to do so through 2036.

Most watched NBA Finals games on ABC
Year	Game	Rating/Share	Viewership
2016	Cleveland Cavaliers vs Golden State Warriors Game 7	15.8/29	31.02M
2010	Boston Celtics vs Los Angeles Lakers Game 7	15.6/27	28.20M
2013	San Antonio Spurs vs Miami Heat Game 7	15.3/26	26.32M
2017	Cleveland Cavaliers vs Golden State Warriors Game 5	13.5/25	24.47M
2011	Dallas Mavericks vs Miami Heat Game 6	13.3/23	23.88M
2015	Golden State Warriors vs Cleveland Cavaliers Game 6	13.4/24	23.25M
2004	Los Angeles Lakers vs Detroit Pistons Game 5	13.8/23	21.84M
2015	Cleveland Cavaliers vs Golden State Warriors Game 5	11.8/21	20.86M
2016	Golden State Warriors vs Cleveland Cavaliers Game 6	11.8/22	20.70M
2013	San Antonio Spurs vs Miami Heat Game 6	12.3/21	20.64M

== Single games ==
=== NBA on Christmas Day ===
Games on Christmas Day have drawn some of the biggest regular season audiences. Since 2001, the most watched Christmas games were:

2004 Miami Heat vs Los Angeles Lakers on ABC averaged a 7.3 rating and 13.18 million viewers.

2010 Miami Heat vs Los Angeles Lakers on ABC averaged a 6.4 rating and 13.11 million viewers.

2015 Cleveland Cavaliers vs Golden State Warriors on ABC averaged a 5.7 rating and 11.12 million viewers.

Average rating/viewership per game for NBA on Christmas Day (2001–present)
Year	Network	Games	Rating	Viewership
2025	ABC, ESPN	5		5.53M
2024	ABC, ESPN	5		5.25M
2023	ABC, ESPN	5		2.85M
2022	ABC, ESPN	5		4.27M
2021	ABC, ESPN	5	1.7	4.08M
2020	ABC, ESPN	5	2.0	4.47M
2019	ABC, ESPN	5		5.34M
2018	ABC, ESPN	5	3.0	5.83M
2017	ABC, ESPN, TNT	5	2.6	5.10M
2016	ABC, ESPN	5	2.3	4.56M
2015	ABC, ESPN	5	3.0	5.55M
2014	ABC, ESPN, TNT	5	2.8	5.22M
2013	ABC, ESPN	5	2.5	4.46M
2012	ABC, ESPN	5	3.1	5.50M
2011 (lockout shortened)	TNT, ABC, ESPN	5	4.0	6.50M
2010	ABC, ESPN	5	3.2	6.00M
2009	ABC, ESPN	5	2.4	4.17M
2008	ABC, ESPN, TNT	5	2.5	4.43M
2007	ABC, ESPN	3	2.6	4.29M
2006	ABC	1	3.5	5.47M
2005	ABC	2	4.4	7.12M
2004	ABC, ESPN	2	5.2	8.92M
2003	ABC, ESPN	3	3.0	4.96M
2002	ABC, ESPN	3	2.8	4.52M
2001	NBC	2	3.2	4.99M

=== NBA All-Star Game ===
The NBA All-Star Game oringally aired on broadcast networks until 2002. TNT then began airing the All-Star Game on cable in 2003, which was simulcast on TBS from 2015 to 2025. NBC then takes over airing the game in 2026.

NBA All-Star Game TV ratings (1990–present)
Year	Network	Results	Rating/Share	Viewership
2026	NBC, Peacock	USA Stars 47, USA Stripes 21		8.80M
2025	TNT, TBS, truTV, Max	Shaq's OGs 41, Chuck's Global Stars 25	2.2	4.72M
2024	TNT, TBS, truTV, Max	East 211, West 186	2.6	5.40M
2023	TNT, TBS	Team Giannis 184, Team LeBron 175	2.2	4.59M
2022	TNT, TBS	Team LeBron 163, Team Durant 160	3.1	6.28M
2021	TNT, TBS	Team LeBron 170, Team Durant 150	3.1	6.13M
2020	TNT, TBS	Team LeBron 157, Team Giannis 155	4.1	7.28M
2019	TNT, TBS	Team LeBron 178, Team Giannis 164	3.8	6.80M
2018	TNT, TBS	Team LeBron 148, Team Stephen 145	4.3	7.65M
2017	TNT, TBS	West 192, East 182	4.2/7	7.75M
2016	TNT, TBS	West 196, East 173	4.3/7	7.61M
2015	TNT, TBS	West 163, East 158	4.3/7	7.18M
2014	TNT	East 163, West 155	4.3/7	7.51M
2013	TNT	West 143, East 138	4.6/8	8.02M
2012	TNT	West 152, East 149	4.4/7	7.07M
2011	TNT	West 148, East 143	5.2/9	9.09M
2010	TNT	East 141, West 139	3.8/6	6.85M
2009	TNT	West 146, East 119	4.5/7	7.62M
2008	TNT	East 134, West 128	3.8/6	6.33M
2007	TNT	West 153, East 132	4.2/7	6.84M
2006	TNT	East 122, West 120	4.3/8	7.07M
2005	TNT	East 125, West 115	4.9/8	8.08M
2004	TNT	West 136, East 132	5.1/10	8.19M
2003	TNT	West 155, East 145	6.6/12	10.83M
2002	NBC	West 135, East 120	8.2/15	13.10M
2001	NBC	East 111, West 110	5.1/8	7.76M
2000	NBC	West 137, East 126	6.9/12	10.52M
1999	Cancelled due to owners' Lockout			
1998	NBC	East 135, West 114	10.6/17	16.93M
1997	NBC	East 132, West 120	11.2/19	16.90M
1996	NBC	East 129, West 118	11.7/20	17.46M
1995	NBC	West 139, East 112	10.7/17	15.78M
1994	NBC	East 127, West 118	9.1/14	13.67M
1993	NBC	West 135, East 132	14.3/22	22.91M
1992	NBC	West 153, East 113	12.8/26	18.83M
1991	NBC	East 116, West 113	7.8/21	10.61M
1990	CBS	East 130, West 113	9.5/13	13.20M

=== Most-viewed game ===
On November 9, 2007, when the Houston Rockets with Yao Ming faced off against the Milwaukee Bucks with Yi Jianlian, over 200 million people in China watched on 19 different networks, making it the most-viewed game in NBA history.

== Regional and Canadian broadcasters ==
NBA games not televised by its national partners are instead broadcast by local broadcast stations and regional sports networks. The two networks may also simulcast the national televised feed of these games, excluding postseason contests. But all of these American national feeds have been treated as non-exclusive in Canada if they involve the Raptors, inducing the 2019 NBA Finals, allowing the Raptors regional telecast to air in tandem with the American national broadcast.

Starting with the 2025–26 season, American regional broadcasters are only allowed to televise preseason and regular season games, as all playoff games become exclusive to the NBA's national TV partners.

Most NBA regional broadcasters are members of national chains:

Regional network	Team(s)
Altitude Sports	Denver
Chicago Sports Network	Chicago
ClipperVision	LA Clippers
DAZN	Cleveland, Indiana, Memphis, Minnesota, San Antonio
Gulf Coast Sports & Entertainment Network (Gray Television)	New Orleans
KJZZ-TV (Smith Entertainment Group)	Utah
KFAA/WFAA (Tegna Inc.)	Dallas
KTVK/KPHE (Gray Television)	Phoenix
Monumental Sports Network	Washington
MSG	New York
NBC Sports Regional Networks	Boston, Golden State, Philadelphia, Sacramento
Rip City Television Network	Portland
Scripps Sports	Detroit
Space City Home Network	Houston
Spectrum Sports	LA Lakers
Sportsnet and TSN (shared rights)	Toronto
Thunder Gameday Network (Griffin Media)	Oklahoma City
WANF (Gray Television)	Atlanta
WAXN-TV/WSOC-TV (Cox Media Group)	Charlotte
WPLG (Berkshire Hathaway)	Miami
WRDQ/WFTV (Cox Media Group)	Orlando
WVTV-DT2 (My 24 WGCV) (Community News Media)	Milwaukee
YES Network	Brooklyn

== See also ==
- NBA TV
- NBA League Pass
- NBA TV Canada
- NBA TV Philippines
- List of current NBA broadcasters
- Major League Baseball on television
- Major League Soccer on television
- NFL on television
- NHL on television
