= Hardwood Classics =

- title card
- Also known as: NBA TV: Hardwood Classics; NBA's Greatest Games
- Country of origin: United States
- No. of episodes: N/A

Production
- Running time: approx. 2 hours

Original release
- Network: NBA TV
- Release: October 1999 – present

Hardwood Classics is a television series that airs on NBA TV and features many of the greatest classic games recorded on videotape or film in National Basketball Association history. The show is produced by NBA Entertainment. During its earlier years on NBA TV, the series would air frequently in various timeslots, including at a set time on Thursday afternoons for a number of years. However, as the network has increased its output of originally-produced programming and live game coverage, Hardwood Classics airs more sporadically, with its most frequent airings taking place during the NBA offseason.

== Format history ==
Each episode normally airs two hours in length (condensed down from the normal two-and-a-half-hour length of a live telecast), although there have been some episodes that were only thirty to sixty minutes long, due to lack of complete footage, or were preserved as newsreels for a majority of games played in the 1950s. And there are still some episodes which were aired in a full two-and-a-half hours of game time. Some recent games, however (e.g. 2008 NBA Finals) were shortened to only an hour despite the full two-hour availability of game footage; they did manage to air Game 4 of that series in full when it was shown as part of the Lakers vs. Celtics finals marathon in 2010. In addition, stock footage was also used and spliced to a previously aired game, as seen in the baseline camera angles substituting for the normal television game angles during Game 5 of the 1993 First Round between the New Jersey Nets and Cleveland Cavaliers.

=== NBA's Greatest Games ===
The series, originally titled NBA's Greatest Games, debuted in 1999, alongside the formation of NBA TV (then NBA.com TV). The program was re-titled NBA TV: Hardwood Classics, presented by The History Channel, in March 2004 (retitled simply as NBA TV: Hardwood Classics when it moved to NBA TV in 2005). However, some episodes still run under the Greatest Games title, although recent re-airings of prior Greatest Games episodes were now retitled under the Hardwood Classics banner.

=== As Hardwood Classics ===
In this re-formatted version, the program features interviews and trivia tidbits pertaining to the game being presented. Hardwood Classics features footage used by the NBA's past and present broadcasting partners, such as ABC, CBS, ESPN, NBC, TBS, TNT, and USA Network, as well as locally produced broadcasts from the individual NBA franchises.

In 2009, Hardwood Classics also began to broadcast condensed 30-minute episodes of the NBA All-Star Weekend Slam Dunk Contest, beginning with the 1984 contest. These programs are shown only during the month of February, which coincides with the NBA All-Star Weekend.

Beginning in 2010, Hardwood Classics is hosted by Marc Fein, and later by either Matt Winer or Rick Kamla, who gives a preview of the selected game as well as facts that followed the game. Previously, Andre Aldridge hosted the program from 2004 to 2005.

Hardwood Classics also lends its name to the Mitchell & Ness clothing line of authentic vintage NBA jerseys, as well as the annual throwback game series "Hardwood Classics Nights", featuring NBA teams in throwback uniforms.

During the 2011 NBA lockout, Hardwood Classics was aired on NBA TV on a daily basis, usually twice a day, primarily to fill in programming hours. This is because recent footage of active NBA players could not be aired per agreement by the league during the lockout, instead NBA TV focused on programming featuring NBA legends during this period, other than ongoing WNBA and NBA Development League games. More recent episodes focused more on an individual player or team accomplishments aside from games which feature signature plays and series/championship victories. Some games previously aired under the "Greatest Games" title were re-aired under the "Hardwood Classics" banner. Every Monday, Hardwood Classics was promoted as 'Old School Monday' and two games or more featuring a significant milestone or moment were aired. 'Old School Monday' airs only during the NBA off-season. Beginning in October, a variation of Hardwood Classics called 'Classic Quarters' is also aired, in which a thirty-minute episode was dedicated to a particular quarter of a classic NBA game.

During the 2020 NBA season break due to the COVID-19 pandemic, NBA TV aired select classic games under the Hardwood Classics Popcast title. The format brought back in-game tidbits last seen under the Greatest Games name.

Even though NBA TV now airs in high definition, Hardwood Classics continue to be shown in standard definition, one of only a few programs on NBA TV to do so. This applies only, however, to games shown before the availability of high definition (e.g. games prior to 2007). In recent years, Hardwood Classics is shown in full high definition, with black pillarboxes filling in for games originally aired in the 4:3 standard definition ratio.

== Notable episodes ==
The episodes that have been broadcast on this series have been mostly playoffs and Finals games, but it also features significant games with great personal accomplishments, such as:

- Kobe Bryant's 81-point game vs. the Toronto Raptors in January 2006.
- Michael Jordan's 63-point game vs. the Boston Celtics in the 1986 NBA Playoffs.
- Michael Jordan's 55-point game vs. the New York Knicks at Madison Square Garden on March 28, 1995, in one of his first games upon returning from his first retirement.
- Kevin Garnett's NBA debut versus the Sacramento Kings at Sacramento in November 1995.
- The playoff duel between Hall of Famers Dominique Wilkins of the Atlanta Hawks and Larry Bird of the Boston Celtics in a 1988 playoff game in Boston Garden.
- Charles Barkley of the Philadelphia 76ers making his NBA debut against the then-Washington Bullets at the Spectrum in Philadelphia.
- Julius Erving's final NBA All-Star Game appearance in 1987 at Seattle's Kingdome.
- Kareem Abdul-Jabbar's final All-Star Game appearance in 1989 at the Houston Astrodome.
- At Denver's now-demolished McNichols Sports Arena, the Denver Nuggets hosted the Detroit Pistons on December 13, 1983 in what still is the NBA's highest scoring game ever, with Detroit winning 186–184 in triple-overtime. This game also set the record for the most players in a single game to score 40 or more points, as Piston players Isiah Thomas and John Long scored 47 and 41 points respectively, while Denver's Kiki Vandeweghe led all scorers with 51 points and teammate Alex English scored 47.
- At Continental Airlines Arena in East Rutherford, New Jersey on December 7, 2006, the Phoenix Suns and New Jersey Nets played in the fourth-highest scoring game in NBA history, with the Suns winning in a 161–157 final score in double-overtime.
- Shaquille O'Neal's NBA debut versus the Miami Heat at Orlando on November 6, 1992.
- Considered by many as the greatest basketball game ever, the upstart Suns took the Celtics to triple-overtime, with the Celtics winning Game 5 of their NBA Finals series, 128–126, on June 4, 1976 at Boston Garden.
- The Toronto Raptors in their first year in the NBA upset the Jordan-led Chicago Bulls, who went on to have a record-breaking 72-win season.

As sort of a special treat for fans, NBA TV normally broadcasts a Hardwood Classics/Greatest Games episode that features a significant game between two franchises that happen to play each other in a game taking place on that same night.

On or around Christmas, NBA TV shows marathons of classic Christmas Day games. These games are from as far back as 1970 and often feature the New York Knicks (with 45 appearances, by far the most of any NBA franchise, including 27 straight years from 1961 to 1988), while other teams are featured as well. One example of this was the Christmas Day 1985 matchup between the Knicks and the eventual champion Boston Celtics where the Knicks trailed 58–33 in the third period, yet came back to force overtime, eventually winning 114–103 in two overtimes. Another notable Knicks Christmas Day game took place a year earlier, featuring them and cross-river rival New Jersey Nets at Madison Square Garden, in which Knicks forward Bernard King scored 60 points in a 120-114 New York loss.

The earliest Christmas Day telecast in the NBA TV archives is a 1970 ABC telecast, between the Hawks and Suns from the Arizona Veterans Memorial Coliseum in Phoenix, with the Suns winning 127–115.

There have been several Hardwood Classics episodes that were re-edited and remastered. For instance, Game 6 of the 2006 NBA Finals, first aired in early 2007, was re-aired three years later with a shortened version of the Miami Heat's championship awarding ceremonies. As mentioned, Game 4 of the 2008 NBA Finals, originally an hour long when it first aired in late 2008, was broadcast in a full two hours when it was re-aired in 2010. In contrast, Larry Bird's 49-point performance against the Portland Trail Blazers in 1992 was originally aired as a two-hour episode in 1999, but was shortened to an hour when it was re-aired in 2004, only covering the latter stages of the fourth quarter and two overtimes.

Some Hardwood Classics games were aired with one portion of the broadcast handled by a local network, and another portion handled by either a national (or another local, preferably the opposing team's) network, handling play-by-play for the duration of a game, often due to audio problems or lack of footage. For example, a majority of Game 5 of the 1984 First Round between the New York Knicks and the Detroit Pistons used the MSG Network broadcast tandem of Marv Albert and Butch Beard, with the remainder handled by the Pistons' WDFN radio broadcast of George Blaha and Dave Bing. Another example was the rebroadcast of Game 5 of the 1987 Eastern Conference Finals between the Pistons and the Celtics, using both the TBS broadcast by Bob Neal and Doug Collins, and the SportsChannel New England broadcast by Mike Gorman and Tom Heinsohn.

== See also ==
- Bulls–Knicks rivalry
- Heat–Knicks rivalry
- Lakers–Celtics rivalry
- Celtics–Pistons rivalry
- Celtics–76ers rivalry
- National Basketball Association rivalries
- NBA All-Star Game
- NBA Finals
