= Randy Cross =

American football player and analyst (born 1954)

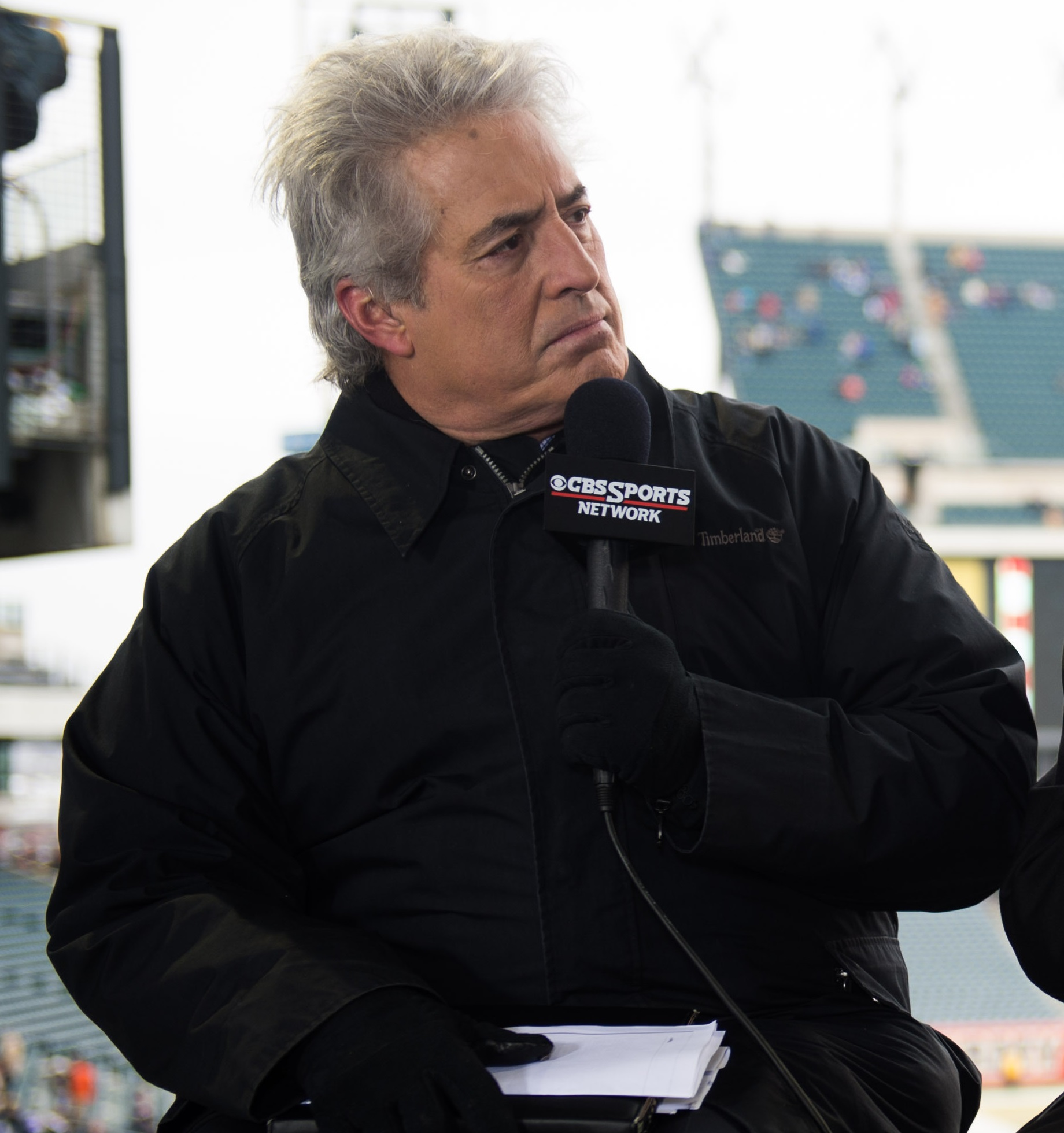
- Cross in 2013

No. 62, 51
- Positions: Guard, center

Personal information
- Born: April 25, 1954 (age 72); Brooklyn, New York, U.S.
- Listed height: 6 ft 3 in (1.91 m)
- Listed weight: 259 lb (117 kg)

Career information
- High school: Crespi Carmelite (Encino, California)
- College: UCLA (1973–1975)
- NFL draft: 1976: 2nd round, 42nd overall pick

Career history
- San Francisco 49ers (1976–1988)

Awards and highlights
- 3× Super Bowl champion (XVI, XIX, XXIII); 3× First-team All-Pro (1981, 1984, 1985); 2× Second-team All-Pro (1980, 1986); 3× Pro Bowl (1981, 1982, 1984); PFWA NFL All-Rookie Team (1976); First-team All-American (1975); First-team All-Pac-8 (1975); Second-team All-Pac-8 (1974)

Career NFL statistics
- Games played: 185
- Games started: 180
- Fumble recoveries: 6
- Stats at Pro Football Reference
- College Football Hall of Fame

Randall Laureat Cross (born April 25, 1954) is an American football analyst and former player. He played as a guard and center in the National Football League (NFL). He played college football for the UCLA Bruins and was inducted into the College Football Hall of Fame in 2011.

== Early life ==
Cross was born in Brooklyn, New York, and attended Crespi Carmelite High School in Encino, California. He was renowned as a high school shot put champion in the Southern California CIF from 1970 to 1972, when he was named CIF California State Meet champion in the event, defeating future world record holder Terry Albritton and future WWF wrestling star Jim Neidhart, both from Newport Harbor High School, in the process.

He heaved the 12-pound high school shot 67' 6.5", which remains the Crespi school and stadium record.

== College career ==
At University of California, Los Angeles (UCLA), Cross was an All-America selection with the Bruins. As a senior, he helped lead his team to the 1976 Rose Bowl championship over top-ranked Ohio State. Cross began his career as a Center, but was moved to Right Guard for his junior year before playing both Guard and Center as senior on a rare rotating nine man offensive line.

On this rotating line Cross started at RG on the 1st unit and then moved to Center when the next group hit the field. He was named First-team All-America in 1975. He was also a First-team All-Conference selection in 1975 In his career, he was a starter in 28 of 34 career games including his final 23. Randy Cross (and many other UCLA linemen) also played collegiate rugby for the school. Randy was inducted into the College Football Hall of Fame in 2010.

== Professional career ==
In 1976, Cross was selected with the 42nd overall pick in the second round of the NFL draft by the San Francisco 49ers. His 13-year career, entirely with the 49ers, included three Pro Bowl selections and three Super Bowl championships (SB XVI, XIX, and XXIII). Cross's last game as a player was Super Bowl XXIII in early 1989.

He played center from 1976 to 1978 then guard from 1979 to 1986 before finishing his career at center in the 1987 and 1988 seasons. Upon his retirement after Super Bowl XXIII, Randy joined the Miller Lite All Star's cast making a series of popular commercials for the brewing giant.

== Broadcasting career ==
From 1989 to 1993, Cross was a member of the CBS Sports team that covered the NFC playoffs and Super Bowl XXVI. In addition, he served as an analyst for CBS Radio Sports' coverage of Super Bowl XXIV, filling in for Hank Stram when the latter was stricken with laryngitis and had to leave the broadcast in the third quarter of the game.

Cross left CBS (following their loss of the NFC package to Fox) to join NBC Sports as a football analyst for NFL telecasts and a part-time analyst for Notre Dame football games. In 1998, he returned to CBS Sports as a game analyst. From 1999 to 2001, Cross served as an analyst on The NFL Today. Cross returned to the broadcast booth in 2002.

He also co-hosts shows on the Sirius NFL Radio. In 2009, he became the color analyst for US Naval Academy home games on CBS College Sports TV. He is the former lead color commentator for New England Patriots pre-season games, from 1995 to 2012, alongside Don Criqui. Randy was a co-host of the midday show "Rick and Randy" with Rick Kamla on WZGC, a CBS radio station in Atlanta, Georgia, before being released from the station.

== Personal ==
Cross lives in Alpharetta, Georgia, with his wife, Patrice Cross. They have three grown children, daughters Kelly and Crystal and son Brendan.

Randy Cross's father, Dennis Cross (1924–1991), was an American actor, who had the lead role in the syndicated adventure series The Blue Angels (1960–61).
