= NBA Jam (TV series) =

- Presented by: See Jammers
- Countries of origin: Philippines; United States
- No. of episodes: 36 episodes each season

Production
- Running time: 30 minutes
- Production company: NBA Entertainment

Original release
- Network: Syndication (1995–2002); Solar Sports (2003–06); RPN (2003–07); Basketball TV (2006–07)
- Release: October 1995 – June 2007

Related
- House of Hoops

NBA Jam is an American-Philippine television series that ran on Solar Sports, RPN and Basketball TV from 1995 to 2007.

== Synopsis ==
Hosted by Vito Lazatin and Reema Chanco, NBA Jam contained segments produced by the NBA and locally by Basketball TV.

== Segments ==
- NBA SpotLight
- Total NBA
- Retro NBA
- Jam of the Week
- NBA All-Access
- NBA Shorts
- NBA School (2005–06, for the Philippine edition)
- NBA Trivia Question (for the Philippine edition)
- On the Scene (for the US edition)
- NBA Tour (for the US edition)
- Young Stars (for the US edition)

== Jammers ==
=== USA edition ===
- Jam (character) (1996–97)
- Ian Eagle announcer (1996–2002)

=== Philippine edition ===
- George Rocha (2003–05)
- Vitto Lazatin (2003–07)
- Reema Chanco (2005–07)
