= NBA Showtime =

American television program

- Also known as: Basketball Night in America (for Sunday night telecasts, 2025–present)
- Genre: Pre-game, halftime and post-game show
- Directed by: Jared Sumner
- Starring: Maria Taylor; Ahmed Fareed
- Country of origin: United States

Production
- Producer: Adam Littlefield
- Running time: 30-60 minutes

Original release
- Network: NBC
- Release: October 10, 1990 – June 12, 2002
- Network: NBC; NBCSN; Peacock; Telemundo, TeleXitos and Universo (Spanish audio/broadcast)
- Release: October 21, 2025 – present

Related
- NBA on NBC

NBA Showtime is a pre-and post-game studio show that airs before and after each NBA on NBC telecast. The program, a half-hour in length, aired during NBC's 12-year run of NBA coverage from the 1990–91 season to the 2001–02 season. In 2025, with NBC reacquiring rights to the league, NBC announced that it would revive the NBA Showtime studio show for its coverage; Sunday night editions are instead branded as Basketball Night in America and modeled after its Football Night in America pregame show for NBC Sunday Night Football.

== Personalities ==
=== Current ===
Hosts

- Maria Taylor: Basketball Night in America and Tuesday host (2025–present)
- Ahmed Fareed: Monday and fill-in Basketball Night in America host (2025–present).
- Jordan Cornette: fill-in host (2025–present)

Analysts

- Carmelo Anthony: lead studio analyst (2025–present)
- Vince Carter: lead studio analyst; alternate color commentator (2025–present)
- Tracy McGrady: lead studio analyst (2025–present)
- Jamal Crawford: rotating studio analyst (2025–present)
- Brad Daugherty: rotating studio analyst (2025–present)
- Robbie Hummel: rotating studio analyst (2025–present)
- Austin Rivers: rotating studio analyst (2025–present)
- Derek Fisher: rotating studio analyst (2025–present)
- Brian Scalabrine: rotating studio analyst (2025–present)

Contributors

- Bob Costas (2025–present)
- Caitlin Clark: Basketball Night in America contributor (2026)
- Isiah Thomas: rotating/guest studio analyst (1998–2000; 2025–present)
- Chris Bosh: guest studio analyst (2026–present)
- Kelenna Azubuike: guest studio analyst (2026–present)

=== Former ===
Hosts

The show was initially hosted by Bob Costas. Costas left in the mid-1990s and became lead play-by-play voice of The NBA on NBC in 1997. Hannah Storm replaced Costas and hosted Showtime until Ahmad Rashad replaced her as host of the pregame show when Storm went on maternity leave in 2001. Storm returned in 2002, which meant that her and Rashad would alternate as hosts throughout the season. Many of the former hosts that served throughout the '90s-2000s run have since been brought back as occasional contributors for the 2025 revival, most notably Costas.

Analysts

- Peter Vecsey (1990–2001)
- Pat Riley (1990–1991)
- Quinn Buckner (1991–1993)
- Julius Erving (1993–1997)
- John Salley (1997–1998)
- Isiah Thomas (1998–2000)
- P. J. Carlesimo (2000–2001)
- Kevin Johnson (2000–2001)
- Mike Fratello (2001–2002)
- Jayson Williams (2001–2002)
- Pat Croce (2001–2002)
- Tom Tolbert (2002)

== Arcade game ==
Midway Games created an NBA Showtime arcade game in 1999. The game was an update to the NBA Jam series, and used the same opening music and presentation style as the television show.

== See also ==
- NBA on NBC
- NBA Countdown
- Showtime (basketball), an era in Los Angeles Lakers history renowned for their fast-break style
