= Vintage NBA =

Vintage NBA is an American basketball biography television series that was aired on ESPN Classic from 1999 to 2002, hosted by Robin Roberts. It is about the entire life of an NBA basketball player, coach or a league.

== Segments ==
- Introduction by present NBA players: Introduces the NBA player by representing any memorabilia from an NBA player
- The NBA Career: Talking about their life of NBA player
- Airwave Archive: Talking about the game they worked as a legend and called it GREATEST with trivia

== Broadcasting ==
In the Philippines, it aired on Basketball TV. Prior to being picked up by BTV at the channel's launch in 2006, it was aired on Solar Sports.
