= Solar Sports =

Philippine television sports channel

- Type: Digital free-to-air television network
- Country: Philippines
- Broadcast area: Nationwide
- Network: Southern Broadcasting Network
- Headquarters: Solar Century Tower, 100 Tordesillas St., Corner H.V. Dela Costa St. Salcedo Village, Makati, Metro Manila, Philippines

Programming
- Languages: English (main); Filipino (secondary)
- Picture format: 16:9 480i SDTV

Ownership
- Owner: Solar Entertainment Corporation
- Sister channels: SolarFlix; DepEd TV; E-Novation TV

History
- Launched: January 1, 1994; 32 years ago October 30, 2002; 24 years ago (as Solar Sports)
- Replaced: NBA Premium TV; Solar Learning: DepEd NCR Prime (SBN DTT channel space)
- Former names: Solar Entertainment Channel (1994–2002)

Availability

Terrestrial
- SBN O&O stations: Digital: Channel 21 (Metro Manila) (LCN: 21.03)
- SkyCable Metro Manila: Channel 70
- Sky Direct Nationwide: Channel 44

Solar Sports is a Philippine digital free-to-air television network based in Shaw Boulevard, Makati, Philippines. It serves as the flagship network of Southern Broadcasting Network, a subsidiary of Solar Entertainment Corporation. The channel was originally launched as a cable channel on October 30, 2002, and is available for Sky Cable, Cablelink, Sky Direct, other local cable operators in the Philippines and via digital free-to-air television in Mega Manila starting October 7, 2024.

== History ==
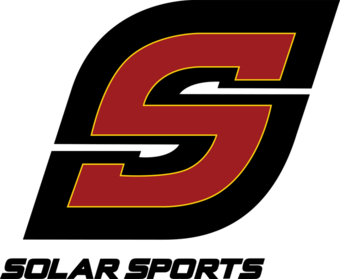
Logo used from 2016 to 2024. The "S" was reused upon returning to digital terrestrial television, combining with the 2002 old logo format.

The channel is known for showing sports that are familiar to the Filipino audience. Its main programming are the NBA games, showing either a game or a doubleheader each day during the season. Other NBA programming includes shows produced by NBA TV, such as the NBA's Greatest Games and WNBA games during the league's off-season. It also shows the American Super Bowl. It is also the Filipino provider of the Olympic Games.

It also shows boxing matches such as the ones from the promotions of Bob Arum, Don King and most recently, Oscar De La Hoya's Golden Boy Promotions. From 2002 to 2006, Solar Sports would cover the fights of Manny Pacquiao, until Pacquiao signed with ABS-CBN for the rights to cover his fights. However, Solar Sports regained the broadcast rights for Pacquiao's fights since 2007 when the channel signed a deal with GMA Network.

Other sports include Volleyball and Badminton, such as the JVC Badminton tournament and the first-ever Manny V. Pangilinan Badminton Tournament, pitting players from Asia and Europe, in 2005.

The network also launched Solar Sports Desk, a late-evening sports news program, similar to ESPN, those famed American sports programs such as SportsCenter. In October 2006, Solar Sports re-launch its channel, adding local shows.

The channel is available exclusively in Metro Manila through Global Destiny Cable as of 2008. It used to be available exclusively on Sky Cable, but the two parties ceased their partnership at end of 2007 but it will be back on July 1. All cable companies in the provinces can put the channel without having to worry about exclusive rights.

On April 10, 2017, Sky Cable & Destiny Cable dropped Solar Sports along with sister channels Basketball TV (now defunct), CT (now defunct), Jack TV (now defunct) & NBA Premium TV (now defunct) allegedly due to Sky Cable's unpaid carriage fees. On January 1, 2019, the channel was restored on Sky Cable after 1 year of carriage disputes.

On October 1, 2019, Basketball TV ceased airing 13 years after it was first aired in 2006, which means all remaining basketball-related programs will now air on Solar Sports. Among those basketball-related programs include NBL Philippines, Liga Endesa, FIBA World Basketball and Universities and Colleges Basketball League among others.

On July 31, 2022, Solar Sports began broadcasting in anamorphic 16:9 aspect ratio. This change allowed for a widescreen presentation, optimizing the viewing experience for viewers with compatible widescreen televisions.

On September 20, 2024, Solar Sports announced on its Facebook page that the channel would become available on digital terrestrial television in key areas of Mega Manila via UHF Channel 21, starting October 7, 2024, marking its return to digital free-to-air television after two years, this time as a free-to-air non-encrypted format. Their logo was also changed prior to its move which they combined the 2002 and 2016 logos.

== Programs ==
=== Current ===
- Basketball
  - B.League
- Billiards
  - Cue Masters
- Boxing
  - Bxstrs
  - KOTV Classics
  - KOTV Weekly
  - UKC: Ultimate Knockout Challenge
  - World Class Boxing (in cooperation with Golden Boy Promotions) (2007)
- Mixed martial arts
  - Professional Fighters League
  - Wednesday Warriors
- Motoring
  - Arctic Race of Norway
  - Auto Focus (2007)
  - Auto Speed
  - Le Mans Classic
  - Motoring Today (2009)
  - Mobil 1 The Grid
  - Rallye des Princesses
- Abu Dhabi Desert Challenge
- Volta Ciclista a Catalunya
- Marathon de Paris
- Next Stop
- Other
  - Board Stories
  - Homecourt
- UCI World Tour
- World of Free Sports
- World Sailing

==== Local programs ====
- AsiaBasket
- Filoil EcoOil Preseason Cup
- Maharlika Pilipinas Basketball League
- National Capital Region Athletic Association
- Philippine Secondary Schools Basketball Championship
- Shakey’s Girls Volleyball Invitational League
- Shakey's Super League (also broadcast on ALIW 23)
- UGB MMA (Underground Battle MMA)
- Universal Reality Combat Championship
- Universities and Colleges Athletic League
- V-League

==== Other non-sports-related ====
- All-Out Action (Tagalog Action Movie Block)
- E-Novation TV
- EZ Shop
- Oras ng Himala

=== Former ===
- 2 Months 2 Million
- A Round of Golf (2008–2015)
- Action After Dark (Tagalog Late Night Movie Block)
- ATP Tour
- Auto Extreme (2001–2007)
- Basketball
  - FIBA World Basketball
  - Liga Endesa
  - The Fifth Quarter
- Billiards Pinoy
- Boxing at the Bay (2009–2015)
- Business & Leisure (2007–2019)
- BWF Super Series
- Car Matchmaker
- Celebrity Poker
- Champions League Basketball 3x3 (Australia)
- Champions Tour
- Davis Cup
- ECW on Sci Fi
- eGG Network (eSports)
- Elite XC
- Fed Cup
- Ferrari World
- Fight Night Max
- Fight Zone
- FLW Outdoor Tour Bass
- French Open
- Friday Fight Fest
- Friday Movie Timeout/Movie Timeout (Hollywood Movie Block)
- Gameplan (2007–2013)
- German Bundesliga
- Global Football
- Glory Kickboxing
- Golf
  - Ladies European Tour
- Golf Today
- Greatest Classics
- Home Shopping Network (2003–2011, 2014–2015)
- Hoop Nation
- Human Wrecking Balls
- IDSF: Best of Dance Sports
- In the Zone
- Jai-Alai Games (2009–2015)
- K-1
- La Liga
- LFP
- Liga Pilipinas (2009–2011)
- Mosconi Cup
- Move (Digital Series)
- NASCAR
- National Basketball League (2018–2022)
- National Basketball League-Youth (2018–2022)
- NBA on Solar Sports (2002–2006)
- NFL
- Other
  - Broken Skull
  - Exterra Adventure
  - Game Changers
  - Nomads
- OZ Style
  - Perspectives (Sports Documentaries)
  - Survivor
  - The Biggest Loser
- Pancrase
- PGA Tour
- Philippine Basketball League (2002–2003)
- Philippine Collegiate Champions League (2004–2008, 2017–2018)
- Philippine Super Liga (2013–2015)
- Pilipinas Super League (2022–2023)
- Pilipinas VisMin Super Cup (2021–2022)
- Poker Heaven
- Premier Darts
- Raceworld
- Ringside (2008–2017)
- Sagupaan (2005–2020)
- San Juan Coliseum Derby Time (2005–2020)
- Saved by the Bell (2008–2018)
- Search TV
- Shifting Gears
- Shop TV (2015–2023)
- Smashing Action (2007–2016)
- Sports Desk (2004–2007, 2012–2014)
- Sports Insider
- Sports Jobs with Junior Seau
- The Fighters
- The Haney Project
- The Ultimate Fighter
- Trans World Sport
- Trump's Fabulous World of Golf
- UFC
- Undisputed
- U.S. Open
- Versus (2008–2015)
- WNCAA
- Women's National Basketball League (2019–2022)
- World Baseball Classic
- World of Athletics
- World of Badminton
- World of Tennis
- World Cup of Pool
- World Game
- World Pool Masters
- World Strongman Super Series
- World Wide Sports
- WTA Tour
- X-Play

== Sports coverages ==
- 2005 Manila SEA Games Coverage
- 2006 Asian Games
- 2008 Beijing Olympic Games Coverage
- 2010 Vancouver Olympic Games
- 2010 Singapore Youth Olympic Games
- 2012 London Olympic Games
- Copa Libertadores
- Fit To Hit: Philippine Beach Volleyball Invitational
- Asian Women's Volleyball Cup
- Shakey's Girls Volleyball League

== See also ==
- Solar Entertainment Corporation
- Basketball TV (defunct)
- NBA Premium TV (defunct)
- S+A (defunct)
- 5 Plus (defunct)
- Balls (defunct)
- Liga (defunct)
- NBA TV Philippines
- One Sports
- One Sports+
- PBA Rush
- TAP Sports
- Premier Sports
- Blast Sports
