= Philippine Secondary Schools Basketball Championship =

Amateur basketball tournament

Philippine Secondary Schools Basketball Championship (PSSBC)
- Sport: Basketball
- Founded: December 2012
- No. of teams: 12
- Country: Philippines
- Continent: Asia
- Broadcaster: Solar Sports

Philippine Secondary Schools Basketball Championship (PSSBC) is a basketball tournament participated by different high school teams from the NCAA, UAAP and Filipino-Chinese leagues. PSSBC's mission is to provide an avenue for young basketball players to further hone their skills before they will advanced in the collegiate level. The PSSBC was founded in December 2012, by the Fil-Chinese owners of different brands, sanctioned by the Samahang Basketbol ng Pilipinas (SBP) and supported by Ever Bilena/Blackwater Elite, Rain or Shine, Freego, Jumbo Plastic Linoleum, MEC Networks, Hapee Toothpaste, Dickies Underwear, and Ironcon Builders.

In 2016, the PSSBC has plans for further expansion, including inviting high school teams from Luzon, Visayas and Mindanao.

On December 19, 2021, PSSBC Commissioner and long-time San Beda Red Cubs coach Edmundo "Ato" Badolato died due to heart attack. He was 74.

== Teams ==
=== 2019 Freego Jeans Cup ===
The competition this year will be among 12 teams: 4 from the UAAP, 4 from the NCAA, 3 from the Filipino-Chinese Amateur Athletic Federation (FCAAF), and 1 from ISAA.

- Ateneo De Manila University
- Adamson University
- Chiang Kai Shek College
- La Salle Greenhills
- Hope Christian High School
- Far Eastern University-Diliman
- La Consolacion College-Manila
- Lyceum of the Philippines University
- Nazareth School-National University
- San Beda University-Taytay
- San Sebastian College-Recoletos
- Xavier School

== Champions ==
- Inaugural Cup (2012): Hope Christian High School
- 2nd Battle of the Champions Cup (2013) : San Sebastian College-Recoletos
- 3rd Ironcon Builders Cup (2014): San Beda High School
- 4th Jumbo Plastic Linoleum Cup (2015): Chang Kai Shek College
- 5th MEC Networks Cup (2016) : Adamson University
- 6th Dickies Underwear Cup (2017) : San Beda High School
- 7th Rain or Shine Cup (2018) : National University-Nazareth School
- 8th Freego Jeans Cup (2019) : National University-Nazareth School
- (2020) : Not Held (COVID-19 pandemic in the Philippines)
- (2021) : Not Held (COVID-19 pandemic in the Philippines)
- (2022) : Not Held
- (2023) : Not Held
- (2024) : Not Held
