= NBA on TBS =

NBA basketball cable telecasts (1984–2002)

- Also known as: America's Game; America's SuperShootout
- Genre: American basketball game telecasts
- Directed by: Tom Smith; Skip Ellison; Mark Goldsmith; Michael Reardon Jr.; Lonnie Dale
- Presented by: Various commentators
- Opening theme: "Higher Ground" by Run-DMC
- Country of origin: United States
- Original language: English
- No. of seasons: 16

Production
- Executive producer: Don McGuire
- Producers: Rohan Backfisch; Glenn Diamond; Joel Westbrook
- Production locations: Various NBA arenas (game telecasts)
- Camera setup: Multi-camera
- Running time: 210 minutes or until game ends (inc. adverts)
- Production company: Turner Sports

Original release
- Network: TBS
- Release: October 10, 1984 – May 14, 2002

Related
- NBA on TNT; NBA on CBS; Inside the NBA

The NBA on TBS is an American presentation of National Basketball Association (NBA) regular season and playoff game telecasts that aired on the American cable and satellite network TBS from October 10, 1984, to May 14, 2002. The games were produced by Turner Sports, the sports division of the Turner Broadcasting System subsidiary of Time Warner, TBS's corporate parent.

TBS obtained rights to air NBA games beginning with the 1984–85 season (replacing the ESPN and USA Network as the NBA's national cable partners) in which TBS shared the NBA television package along with CBS. The 1989–90 season then saw Turner start to split the NBA cable package between TBS and TNT. TBS then lost its portion of the cable package to ESPN prior to the start of the 2002–03 season, with TNT following suit and losing their rights to NBC and Amazon prior to the start of the 2025–26 season.

== Coverage ==
=== Atlanta Hawks ===
For many years beginning when the station assumed rights to the team's game telecasts in the late 1970s, WTBS (channel 17) in Atlanta – which served as the originating feed of the national TBS cable channel from December 1976 to October 2007 – aired some regular season games from the Atlanta Hawks (which was also owned by Ted Turner at the time), which also aired nationally on WTBS's superstation feed; TBS aired the games nationwide until the telecasts became subjected to NBA blackout restrictions within 35 miles of the home team's arena, resulting in many Hawks away games televised by the network being unavailable to cable providers within the designated market area of the opposing team (this restriction was dropped when TNT gained the right to be the exclusive broadcaster of any game that it chose to carry).

=== National coverage ===
When it began to televise games from NBA teams other than the Hawks beginning with the 1984–85 season, TBS maintained a package of approximately 55 regular season NBA games annually on Tuesday and Friday nights. TBS also carried numerous NBA Playoff games as well as the NBA draft from 1985–1989.

=== Playoff coverage ===
TBS was also allowed to televise 20 early round conference playoff games beginning with the 1985 NBA playoffs. In 1986, TBS (as well as CBS) did not carry Game 1 of the Eastern Conference Finals, relegating the broadcast of that game to television stations in the team's designated market areas; this would be the last time that an NBA Conference Finals game was not televised on a national network. During the 1989 NBA playoffs, only 13 of the 24 games (comprising Games 1–3 of each series) in the first round aired on TBS or CBS. For example, none of the four games from the Seattle-Houston first round series appeared on national television.

=== All-Star Weekend ===
Beginning in 1986, TBS televised the various contests from the NBA All-Star Weekend. In 1987, the slam dunk contest was televised live for the very first time on the network.

=== Partnership with TNT ===
In the summer of 1988, the Turner Broadcasting System signed a new joint broadcast contract between TBS and TNT effective with the 1989-90 NBA season; beginning that season, TBS and TNT split broadcast rights to televise NBA games. TNT held rights to broadcast the NBA Draft and most NBA regular season and playoff games, while TBS only aired single games or double-headers once a week.

Both networks continued to expand their NBA coverage during the late 1990s; by this time, TBS only aired games on Wednesday nights, while TNT ran games on Monday, Tuesday and Friday nights. By 1994, the opening round of the playoffs featured overlapping doubleheaders on both TBS and TNT on the first two nights of each series.

==== 1999–2001 ====
For the 1999-2000 NBA season, TBS shifted its primetime game telecasts from Wednesdays to Mondays. For the 2000–2001 NBA season, the broadcasts were moved to Tuesdays, while TNT assumed rights to Wednesday and Thursday evening games.

Starting in 2000, the NBA spread out telecasts of games from the Eastern Conference and Western Conference playoff series so that only two series would play on their scheduled game days (so as to avoid scheduling conflicts and ratings competition between TNT and TBS). TNT would air doubleheaders on most weekdays, while TBS would air one doubleheader each week.

==== 2001–2002 ====
The 2001–2002 season would ultimately mark TBS's final year of NBA coverage. Turner Sports signed a new NBA television contract in which TNT would assume rights to Turner's NBA package, while TBS would discontinue game coverage altogether; ESPN assumed TBS's half of the NBA's cable television rights. During 2002, TBS aired doubleheaders every Tuesday night of the playoffs until the Conference Finals. The final NBA game ever to be regularly televised on TBS aired on May 13, 2002, when the San Antonio Spurs faced the Los Angeles Lakers in Game 5 of the Western Semi-finals. In that last game, Robert Horry hit a key three-pointer that won the series four games to one for the Lakers to move on to the Western Conference Finals.

==== Coverage anomalies ====
On May 3, 1992, Game 4 of the playoff series between the Los Angeles Clippers and the Utah Jazz was rescheduled due to the 1992 Los Angeles riots and its broadcast was moved to TBS from NBC, creating a problem as the game was now required to be blacked out within the Los Angeles television market. The game was only available in the Los Angeles area through SportsChannel Los Angeles, a regional sports premium cable service (as opposed to TBS, which operates as a basic cable channel and at the time, a superstation). SportsChannel Los Angeles chose not to unscramble its signal and as a result, viewers complained in letters to the Los Angeles Times and other sources that the game should have been made available to all cable subscribers as a public service.

== Previous broadcasts ==
On isolated occasions (typically during the playoffs) since TNT assumed partial cable rights to the NBA, TBS has served as an overflow feed for certain games. In 2003, TBS aired a doubleheader of first round Game 6 matchups (the Indiana Pacers-Boston Celtics and San Antonio Spurs-Phoenix Suns series). On May 22, 2006, due to Game 7 of the San Antonio Spurs-Dallas Mavericks series going into overtime, TBS aired part of the Game 7 Western Conference playoff match between the Los Angeles Clippers and Phoenix Suns. On May 14, 2004, the same situation arose, as Game 5 of the New Jersey Nets-Detroit Pistons playoff series lasted three overtimes. However, due to scheduling conflicts with TBS, TNT had to air part of the Sacramento Kings-Minnesota Timberwolves game that was supposed to follow on NBA TV. The first few minutes of Game 4 of the 2007 Western Conference Semi-final between the Phoenix Suns and San Antonio Spurs were shown on TBS, due to the game between the Cleveland Cavaliers and the New Jersey Nets running past the former's 9:30 p.m. Eastern start time. In the 2021 NBA playoffs, Game 5 between the Los Angeles Clippers and the Utah Jazz had to temporarily air on TBS due to the game between the Atlanta Hawks and Philadelphia 76ers finishing later than usual.

The above situations are not unlike those that have been encountered during TBS telecasts of Major League Baseball Division Series games since 2007; at times, due to certain games running over their scheduled end time, TNT has had to air the first few minutes of games that TBS is supposed to cover.

From 2015 to 2025, TBS has simulcast TNT's coverage of the NBA All-Star Game. In 2019, instead of simulcasting TNT's feed, TBS carried a special Players Only telecast, with Greg Anthony, a former NBA first-round pick, doing play-by-play, Hall of Famer Charles Barkley from Inside the NBA, and Kevin Garnett, Minnesota Timberwolves legend, analyzing the game, and former NBA 3-point marksman Dennis Scott reporting from the sidelines. TBS returned to simulcasting TNT's feed in 2020, after the Players Only brand was canceled by the Turner Sports. In 2022 and 2023, the Inside the NBA crew called TBS' alternate broadcast of the All-Star Game. TBS later returned to simulcasting TNT's feed in 2024 and 2025 as future alternate broadcasts moved to sister channel TruTV.

== Commentators ==
=== Play-by-play ===
- Marv Albert
- Rick Barry
- Tim Brando
- Kevin Calabro
- Chip Caray
- Skip Caray
- Jim Durham
- Mike Gorman
- Kevin Harlan
- Verne Lundquist
- Bob Neal
- Charlie Neal
- Mel Proctor
- Dick Stockton
- Ron Thulin
- Pete Van Wieren

=== Color commentators ===
- Danny Ainge
- John Andariese
- Red Auerbach
- Rick Barry
- Hubie Brown
- Quinn Buckner
- Doug Collins
- Chuck Daly
- Mike Fratello
- Walt Frazier
- Jack Givens
- Mike Glenn
- Rod Hundley
- Steve Jones
- John MacLeod
- Don Nelson
- Bill Raftery
- Doc Rivers
- Oscar Robertson
- Bill Russell
- Reggie Theus
- John Thompson
- Dick Versace
- Bill Walton

=== Contributors ===
- Bryan Burwell
- Jim Huber

=== Studio hosts ===
- Vince Cellini
- Kevin Christopher
- Fred Hickman
- Ernie Johnson Jr.
- Paul Ryden

=== Christmas Day broadcasters ===
Year	Teams	Play-by-play	Color commentator(s)
1984	New Jersey Nets at New York Knicks	Rick Barry	Bill Russell
1985	Los Angeles Clippers at Portland Trail Blazers	Rick Barry	Bill Russell
1986	Washington Bullets at Philadelphia 76ers	Bob Neal	Rick Barry
1987	Atlanta Hawks at Philadelphia 76ers	Skip Caray	Steve Jones
1988	Washington Bullets at Philadelphia 76ers		

=== Conference Finals broadcasters ===
Year	Conference	Play-by-play	Color commentators
1989	Eastern (Games 2, 5); Western (Games 2–3)	Skip Caray; Bob Neal	Rick Barry (Game 2) and Steve Jones (Game 5); Steve Jones
1988	Eastern (Games 1–2, 5); Western (Games 1–3)	Skip Caray; Bob Neal	Rick Barry; Steve Jones
1987	Eastern (Games 1–2, Game 5), Western (Game 3); Western (Game 2)	Bob Neal; Mel Proctor	Doug Collins; Bill Russell
1986	Eastern (Game 2); Western (Game 2)	Skip Caray; Rick Barry	John Andariese; Bill Russell
1985	Eastern (Games 2, 5); Western (Game 2)	Skip Caray; Rick Barry	John Andariese; Bill Russell

== Music ==
At the end of its 1987 playoff coverage, TBS used Bachman-Turner Overdrive's "Takin' Care of Business" as the soundtrack for the closing credits sequence during the game telecast. TBS used Run-DMC to perform and compose its theme during the early 2000s. The song included a version of the Stevie Wonder song "Higher Ground."

== Contract history ==
Seasons	Network	Amount
1984–85 to 1985–86	TBS	$20 million/2 years
1986–87 to 1987–88	TBS	$25 million/2 years
1988–89 to 1989–90	TBS/TNT	$50 million/2 years
1990–91 to 1993–94	TNT	$275 million/4 years
1994–95 to 1997–98	TNT/TBS	$397 million/4 years
1998–99 to 2001–02	TNT/TBS	$840 million/4 years

== Sources ==
- 1996–2000 NBA playoff announcers

Records
Preceded by ESPN; USA	NBA pay television carrier 1984–2002 with TNT (1989–2002)	Succeeded by ESPN
