= NBA TV =

American sports pay television network

- Country: United States
- Broadcast area: Nationwide
- Headquarters: Secaucus, New Jersey, U.S.

Programming
- Language: English
- Picture format: 1080i HDTV

Ownership
- Owner: National Basketball Association

History
- Launched: November 2, 1999; 26 years ago
- Replaced: CNN/SI (on many cable systems)
- Former names: NBA.com TV (1999–2003)

Links
- Website: NBAtv

Availability

NBA TV is an American sports-oriented pay television network owned and operated by the National Basketball Association (NBA). Dedicated to basketball, the network features exhibition, regular season and playoff game broadcasts from the NBA season and related professional basketball leagues, as well as NBA-related content including analysis programs, specials and documentaries. The network is headquartered in Secaucus, New Jersey. The network also serves as the national broadcaster of the NBA G League and WNBA games. NBA TV is the oldest subscription network in North America to be owned or controlled by a professional sports league, having launched on November 2, 1999.

As of November 2023, NBA TV is available to approximately 37.0 million television households in the United States, down from its 2013 peak of 61.0 million households.

== History ==
The network launched on November 2, 1999 as nba.com TV; the channel, which was renamed to the second and current name on 11 February 2003, originally operated from studio facilities housed at NBA Entertainment in Secaucus, New Jersey. The network signed a multi-year carriage agreement with three of the U.S.'s five largest cable providers, Cox Communications, Cablevision and Time Warner Cable, on June 28, 2003; this expanded the network's reach to 45 million pay television households in the U.S., in addition to distribution in 30 countries worldwide. After Time Warner shut down the sports news network CNN/SI in 2002, many cable providers replaced that network with NBA TV.

The network mainly launched with two purposes; to serve as a barker channel for the league's out-of-market sports package NBA League Pass, along with featuring statistical and scoring information which was more easily accessible in the pre-broadband age, and it featured mainly archival content from the NBA Entertainment archives in its upper pane to fill programming time. As time went on, the network added more programming, including international basketball leagues and programming from FIBA usually unseen in the American market. The programming mix and channel format changed around the same time of the CNN/SI shutdown.

In 2008, Time Warner's Turner Sports division reached an agreement to take over operations of NBA TV and the league's digital properties. Their operations were re-located to Turner's studios in Atlanta, and NBA TV was re-launched at the start of the 2008–09 season with a larger emphasis on being a "primary destination" for the league. There would be a larger amount of live studio programming, and the network also began to feature NBA on TNT personalities such as Charles Barkley and Kenny Smith.

In 2024, the NBA signed a new media rights deal with ABC/ESPN, NBC and Amazon Prime Video beginning in the 2025–26 season, ending TNT's broadcasting relationship with the league. For several months, the future of the channel remained uncertain with no entity designated to operate the channel. On November 18, TNT parent company Warner Bros. Discovery announced that they reached a settlement with the NBA over a lawsuit it had filed over Prime Video's contract, which includes certain international and highlights rights for WBD divisions, and a five-year renewal with TNT Sports (formerly Turner Sports) to operate NBA TV and the NBA's digital properties.

On June 27, 2025, it was instead announced that TNT Sports would withdraw from its management agreement with NBA TV and NBA Digital, and its operations would be taken in-house by the league from its headquarters in New Jersey effective October 1. TNT Sports CEO Luis Silberwasser stated that the division was "unable to agree on a path forward that recognized the value of our expertise, quality content and operational excellence that our fans and partners have come to expect from TNT Sports." A sticking point in negotiations was the lower number of games that NBA TV would be able to air due to the new contracts made by NBC and Prime Video, additionally the network will no longer air any playoff games (as that part of the deal was in TNT’s expired package).

== Carriage agreements ==
On April 16, 2009, DirecTV announced that it had reached a carriage agreement with the NBA to continue carrying NBA TV, moving it (and out-of-market sports package NBA League Pass) from the satellite provider's Sports Pack add-on tier to its lower-priced Choice Xtra base package on October 1, 2009. DirecTV believed the move will make the channel available to an additional eight million subscribers.

On June 4, 2009, Comcast announced that it had reached an agreement with the NBA to move the channel from the cable provider's Sports Entertainment Package to its basic level Digital Classic package, by the start of the 2009–10 NBA season. Like DirecTV, Comcast estimated that an additional eight million customers would effectively gain access to the channel. Verizon FiOS added the channel and NBA League Pass to its systems on September 23, 2009. The network also signed new multi-year agreements with Time Warner Cable, Cablevision and Dish Network on October 22, 2009, as well as a renewal agreement with Cox Communications earlier in the year.

With all of the above carriage deals, the NBA estimates that it would increase NBA TV's overall subscriber reach to 45 million pay television homes. On October 29, 2010, AT&T U-verse reached a carriage deal to carry the channel's standard and high definition feeds.

NBA TV is not available to legacy Charter Communications customers using outdated billing plans, which carried the network as NBA.com TV prior to 2004, due to unknown carriage conflicts; NBA League Pass was likewise unavailable on Charter until a broader rollout for the 2020–21 season began (on May 18, 2016, Charter acquired Time Warner Cable and Bright House Networks for $78.7 billion, which both carried the network). NBA TV has been available to Charter households where available since February 2017, if a customer switches to the new 'Spectrum' billing plan which united Charter, Time Warner Cable and Bright House Networks under the Spectrum branding (this is all likely unrelated to Charter's inherited naming rights of the Charlotte Hornets' home arena, the Spectrum Center).

As of June 2023, the channel was available in 38.6 million homes in the United States.

== Programming ==
NBA TV primarily broadcasts programming related to the NBA, including studio shows and podcasts discussing the league, as well as factual programming (such as documentaries) following the league and its players, and archival content such as classic games. NBA TV carries at least 60 regular season games per season; these games are simulcast from one of the local broadcasters, and are non-exclusive—being subject to blackout within the markets of the participating teams. The network was previously associated with the NBA on TNT and its personalities; until the 2025–26 season, it carried a package of selected first-round playoff games.

The channel's previous flagship program was NBA Gametime Live, a studio show featuring coverage of news from around the league, and highlights and look-ins at games currently in progress. It broadcast six nights per-week during the NBA season, aside from Thursday nights during the regular season (when the network instead aired encores of Inside the NBA)

On October 11, 2017, it was announced that the Players Only franchise, which made its debut last season on TNT, will show live games on NBA TV, starting October 24, 2017 and every Tuesday after that, for the first half of the 2017–18 season before transitioning to TNT for the remainder of the regular season starting January 23, 2018. After the cancellation of Players Only in 2019, Tuesday (first half) and Monday (second half) night games on NBA TV were rebranded as NBA TV Center Court, with Brian Anderson handling the Tuesday night games and Spero Dedes the Monday night games. They are joined alongside Greg Anthony and Dennis Scott. With TNT moving its marquee games to Tuesdays in 2021 during the NFL regular season (thus avoiding competition with Thursday Night Football), NBA TV Center Court was moved to Monday nights for most of the season, though it would continue to air select broadcasts on Tuesdays when TNT has other programming commitments.

Beginning 2021, NBA TV began to broadcast a package of men's and women's Southwestern Athletic Conference (SWAC) college basketball games in February as an observance of Black History Month. This marked NBA TV's first broadcasts of college basketball games.

In October 2025, with the transition to in-house operations, NBA TV announced a revamp of its television and digital programming launching on October 15, with goals for the channel and the NBA apps to become a "24/7 hub" for basketball. The new schedule features television simulcasts of Sirius XM NBA Radio shows such as The Starting Lineup and NBA Today. The Association serves as NBA TV's new flagship studio show, and will also stream for free on the NBA app. The network also acquired rights to various international basketball leagues as part of a partnership with Sportradar, and there are plans to broadcast coverage of high school basketball games under the Future Starts Now banner. The channel will continue to air 60 non-exclusive regular season NBA games per-season.

=== List of programs broadcast by NBA TV ===
- 10 Before Tip
- 3DTV
- Beyond The Paint
- Books and Basketball
- Courtside Cinema
- Game Of The Day
- #Handles
- Hardwood Classics (1999–present)
- High Tops: Plays of the Month
- Inside the NBA (2003–2025) (encore telecasts within 12 hours of original airing on NBA on TNT)
- NBA 360
- NBA Access with Ahmad Rashad
- NBA Action (2003–present)
- NBA Basketballography
- NBA.com Fantasy Insider
- NBA CrunchTime – focuses on live NBA games till the buzzer, includes CrunchTime Alert, similar to NBA Scores
- NBA Fit
- NBA Gametime Live (2008–2025)
- NBA Gametime Live Specials (e.g. mock draft, free agent updates, season previews, trade deadline updates, playoff previews)
- The Association (2025–present)
- NBA Nightcap (2025–present) (encore telecasts within 12 hours of original streaming on NBA on Prime Video)
- NBA Home Video
- NBA Hoop Party
- NBA Inside Stuff (2013–2018)
- NBA Jam
- NBA Journeys
- NBA Presents
- NBA Slideshow
- NBA Specials
- NBA TV Top 10 Games of the Week
- NBA TV Marquee Matchup
- NBA TV Originals
- NBA Vault
- NBA Wired
- Open Court
- Playoff Playback
- Real NBA
- Real Training Camp
- Shaqtin' a Fool (2013–2025)
- The Beat
- The Starters (2006–2019)
- Vintage NBA
- WNBA Action

== High definition ==
NBA TV HD is a 1080i high-definition simulcast feed of NBA TV that is available on most providers. All studio programs and original programs are shot in HD, and all live games and recent game rebroadcasts are televised in HD. The high-definition version of this channel was launched in 2007.

== Personalities ==
The studio host and analysts vary on each night's broadcast of NBA Gametime.

=== Studio hosts and play-by-play ===
- Andre Aldridge (2005–present)
- Brian Anderson (2014–present)
- Kevin Calabro (2012–2014, 2022–present)
- Vince Cellini (2009–present)
- Scott Cole (2018–present)
- Spero Dedes (2003–present)
- Ian Eagle (2012–present)
- Kevin Frazier (2021–present)
- Michael Grady (2021–present)
- Jared Greenberg (2011–present)
- Bob Fitzgerald (2020–present)
- Ernie Johnson (2008–present)
- Rick Kamla (2002–present)
- Kristen Ledlow (2016–present)
- Allie LaForce (2018–present)
- Adam Lefkoe (2020–present)
- Joel Meyers (2020–present)
- Chris Miles (2018–present)
- Ro Parrish (2016–present)
- Pete Pranica (2018–present)
- Ahmad Rashad (2007–present)
- Stephanie Ready (2018–present)
- Kevin Ray (2019–present)
- Casey Stern (2015–present)
- Matt Winer (2010–present)
- Nabil Karim (2022–present)
- Kelly Crull (2023–present)
- Ashley ShahAhmadi (Sideline Reporter for 1st round of 2023 NBA Playoffs 2023-present)

=== Studio analysts and color commentators ===
- David Aldridge (2008–present)
- Greg Anthony (2010–present)
- Brent Barry (2009–present)
- Vinny Del Negro (2013–present)
- Rick Fox (2010–present)
- Mike Fratello (2008–present)
- Channing Frye (2020–present)
- Brendan Haywood (2016–present)
- Grant Hill (2016–present)
- Stu Jackson (2016–present)
- Bernard King (2010–present)
- Brevin Knight (2009–present)
- Kyle Korver (2021–present)
- Kevin McHale (2009–2011; 2016–present)
- Sam Mitchell (2008–2010; 2013–2015, 2016–present)
- Shaquille O'Neal (2011–present)
- Candace Parker (2018–present)
- Morris Peterson (2011–present)
- Dennis Scott sideline reporter for NBA Playoffs (2009–present)
- Kenny Smith (2008–present)
- Steve Smith (2008–present)
- Isiah Thomas (2012–present)
- Dwyane Wade (2019–present)
- Chris Webber (2008–present)
- Lloyd Pierce (2023–present)
- Jalen Rose (2024- present)
- Vince Carter (2024- present)

=== Contributors ===
- Joe Borgia
- Sekou Smith
- Lang Whitaker

=== Other hosts ===
The Starters (2006–2019)

- Leigh Ellis
- Trey Kerby
- Tas Melas
- J. E. Skeets

NBA Inside Stuff (2013–2018)

- Grant Hill
- Kristen Ledlow

=== Former hosts and analysts ===
- Marv Albert (2010)
- Derrick Coleman (2009)
- Antonio Davis (2008–2012)
- LaPhonso Ellis (2009)
- Marc Fein (2008–2011)
- Lawrence Frank (2010)
- Matt Harpring (2010)
- Lionel Hollins (2013)
- Eddie Jordan (2008–2009)
- Tracy McGrady (2013)
- Kyle Montgomery (2009–2013)
- Gary Payton (2008–2009)
- Scot Pollard (2009–2014)
- Syleys Roberts (2012–2015)
- Byron Scott (2013)
- Eric Snow (2008–2010)
- Jerry Stackhouse (2010–2016)
- Reggie Theus (2008–2009)
- Stan Van Gundy (2019–2020)

== NBA TV International ==
NBA TV International is a feed of NBA TV available in countries outside the United States, utilizing the same studio for analysis and commentary segments and taped programming (except for FIBA events and highlights), but largely airs a different lineup of games than the U.S. channel. NBA TV International shows one or two live regular season games per day, with the delayed coverage of selected playoff games that are not broadcast live by NBA TV, all conference semis, finals and the Finals, as well as All-Star live games and contests and most nationally televised U.S. games (such as those seen on ABC, ESPN and US feed of NBA TV); the rights to those games are instead sold to domestic television networks in each territory. As of 2022, NBA TV International can be seen in 100 countries via the following partners:

- Sky Italia (Italy)
- Sky Deutschland (Austria and Germany)
- Sky Switzerland (Switzerland)
- DirecTV (South America)
- Canal+ (France)
- TV8 until 2017; Saran Holding since 2017 (Turkey)
- NTV Plus (Russia)
- OTE TV (Greece)
- Flow (Argentina)
- NOS since 2015; MEO since February 2017 (Portugal)
- Telkom (Indonesia)
- Rakuten (Japan)
- TrueVisions (Thailand)
- Tencent (Mainland China)
- SK Telecom, KT and LG U+ (South Korea)
- Starhub (Singapore)
- Astro (Brunei and Malaysia)
- StarTimes (2013–2016); Kwesé Sports (2017–2019) (Sub-Saharan Africa)
- Mts TV (Serbia)
- BT Consumer, Sky UK and Ireland and Virgin Media (United Kingdom and Ireland)
- Kujtesa; ArtMotion; IPKO (Kosovo)

NBA TV Canada, the Canadian version of the channel owned by Toronto Raptors owners Maple Leaf Sports & Entertainment, carries some of the same game broadcasts as the flagship U.S. service, and ESPN instead of the secondary game package found on NBA TV International.

On 16 October 2010, NBA Premium TV was launched in the Philippines. It was a redirect broadcast of NBA TV and aired locally televised and nationally televised games in the United States. It went defunct on 1 October 2019, almost 9 years after it existed.

In February 2012, NBA TV International was made available on NBA.TV as an internet subscription channel outside the United States.

On beIN Channels Network in the Arab world, NBA TV is not available, though beIN Sports NBA airs some of the same games.

On 31 July 2020, the Philippine version of the channel, NBA TV Philippines, was launched.

== Past playoff broadcast criticism ==
NBA TV was criticized in the past for its first-round playoff coverage merely passing down the broadcast of a game from a regional sports network for national broadcast, amplifying the chosen team's broadcast and bias for said team to a national level. from the 2012 playoffs to the 2025 playoffs, NBA TV produced a full and neutral national broadcast for those games.

== See also ==
- List of current National Basketball Association broadcasters
- NBL TV
