= NBA TV Philippines =

Pay television channel in the Philippines (2020)

- Logo used since 2024
- Country: Philippines
- Broadcast area: Nationwide
- Network: NBA TV

Programming
- Language: English
- Picture format: 1080i HDTV (downscaled to 16:9 480i for the SDTV feed)

Ownership
- Owner: Cignal TV (MediaQuest Holdings) under license from National Basketball Association
- Sister channels: One PH; One News; One Sports+; Kapatid Channel; PBA Rush; UAAP Varsity Channel

History
- Launched: July 31, 2020; 6 years ago
- Former names: NBA Premium TV (Solar Entertainment Corporation)

Availability

Terrestrial
- Cignal TV Nationwide: Channel 96 (SD); Channel 262 (HD)
- SatLite Nationwide: Channel 52

Streaming media
- Pilipinas Live: Watch live

NBA TV Philippines is a Philippine pay television sports-oriented network owned by MediaQuest Holdings through its subsidiary Cignal TV. The channel is a joint venture between Cignal and NBA TV and is a live simulcast broadcast of the international feed of NBA TV, the league's dedicated channel in the United States.

== Features ==
NBA TV Philippines is the sister channel of One Sports, One Sports+, PBA Rush, and UAAP Varsity Channel, but the channel is slated to air more games and NBA-content than its sister channel via TV5 and RPTV (free TV partner).

== History ==
Upon the expiration of the decade-long contract of Solar and NBA, Sky of ABS-CBN Corporation and Cignal TV of TV5 in their joint statement said that they were jointly negotiating directly with the NBA to make games and programming available to millions of fans in the Philippines. However, Sky and ABS-CBN Corporation later dropped out of the bid due to its issue on legislative franchise renewal which led both ABS-CBN and its sister station, an all-sports channel S+A ceased broadcast on free-to-air television on May 5, 2020, as well as the dissolution of its sports division on August 31 as part of the company's retrenchment after the denial of its franchise renewal, leaving Cignal as a sole bidder.

On the start of the 2019-20 NBA season, the NBA was left without a broadcast partner in the Philippines, they temporarily streamed their games in the NBA Philippines page via Facebook Watch and Twitter, it was only on November 16 when NBA temporarily went onto an agreement with Nine Media Corporation via CNN Philippines (now RPTV) to air their games albeit only on weekends, the broadcast of games continued throughout the 2020 NBA All-Star Game.

After months of negotiations on July 27, 2020, Cignal TV announced the multi-year partnership deal with the NBA, on the announcement it was also mentioned that the provider will launch the channel along with the airing of games through its free-to-air channels, TV5 and One Sports. The channel was launched on July 31, 2020, the same day when the NBA's restart of the current season started (July 30 in Orlando time).

Cignal plans to offer the channel for syndication to other cable operators.

In addition, the deal would allow Smart Communications to provide a livestreaming of NBA TV Philippines on Smart's official website for Smart prepaid and TNT subscribers with GigaVideo subscription, as well as for Smart Signature postpaid subscribers. The livestream, however, is separate from the league's own streaming service NBA League Pass.

The deal with Cignal TV was renewed in September 2023, ahead of the 2023–24 NBA season, which adds the NBA 2K League as part of its programming. Cignal's sports streaming app Pilipinas Live will broadcast NBA and NBA 2K League games that are aired on the network's television channels. Starting with the 2025–26 NBA season, however, daily live games have been reduced to select days due to changes in global broadcasting rights of the league with the inclusion of other key partners such as Prime Video and Disney+ Philippines.

== See also ==
- TV5
- RPTV
- One Sports (division)
- One Sports
- PBA Rush
- UAAP Varsity Channel
- 5 Plus (defunct)
- AKTV (defunct)
- Hyper (defunct)
- NBA Premium TV (defunct)
- Basketball TV (defunct)
- NBA League Pass
