= Rick Kamla =

American sportscaster

Rick Kamla (born July 19, 1969) is a television personality for NBA TV and CBS Sports.

== Early life ==
Kamla graduated from the University of Minnesota in 1992 with a degree in history and a minor in Speech-Communication. While attending the University of Minnesota, Kamla covered the Golden Gophers on the student-run radio station KUOM.

== Professional career ==
In 1994, Kamla started his sports journalism career as a part-time writer for Fantasy Football Weekly, which was based in Minneapolis. By 1998, Kamla was the full-time senior editor for both fantasy football and fantasy basketball the Fanball website.

Kamla was hired to host the fantasy show Virtual GM on NBA TV. In the 2000s, he was the host of the programme NBA TV Fantasy Hoops.
