= E-Novation TV =

Television channel in the Philippines

- Headquarters: Makati City, Metro Manila, Philippines

Programming
- Picture format: 1080i (HDTV) (downscaled to 16:9 480i for the SDTV feed)

Ownership
- Owner: Solar Entertainment Corporation
- Sister channels: DepEd TV; SolarFlix; Solar Sports

History
- Launched: 2003 (as Home Shopping Network); November 1, 2005; 20 years ago (as Shop TV); October 10, 2026; 11 days ago (as E-Novation TV)
- Replaced: Shop TV (UHF Channel 21 space)
- Closed: July 12, 2026; 3 months ago (as Shop TV)
- Replaced by: All TV (Sky Cable channel space); PRTV Prime Media (Cignal channel space)
- Former names: Home Shopping Network (2003–2005); Shop TV (2005–2026)

Availability

Terrestrial
- SBN O&O stations: Digital: Channel 21 (Metro Manila) (LCN: 21.05)

E-Novation TV (formerly Shop TV and Home Shopping Network and stylized as e-NovationTV) is a shopping related TV channel owned by Solar Entertainment Corporation.

== History ==
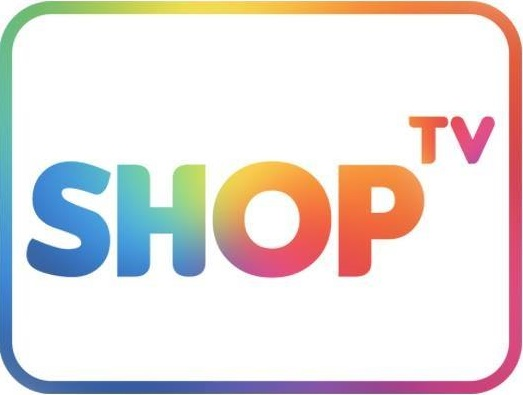
Final Shop TV logo used from 2019 to 2026

=== As Home Shopping Network (2003–05) ===
The idea for a 24/7 shopping channel in the Philippines was not as ubiquitous as it is today. It all began when a family of entrepreneurs decided to take a risk in October 2003 and introduced the concept of home shopping networks to the Philippine market.

=== As Shop TV (2005–26) ===
Initially, Shop TV of Home Shopping Network aired for 12 hours daily starting in November 2005. It later expanded its coverage to 24/7 airing by August 2006.

On October 1, 2021, Shop TV terminated on Cignal due to its expired contract, while Sky Cable terminated the channel on March 24, 2024, for the same reason.

On December 25, 2025, Shop TV temporarily went off-air due to changes in broadcast operations. On March 9, 2026, Shop TV resumed broadcasting. However, the channel went off-air once again on July 12, 2026, in preparation for the relaunch.

=== As E-Novation TV (2026–present) ===
On October 10, 2026, Shop TV was officially relaunched as E-Novation TV, which airs on weekdays from 8:00 a.m. to 8:30 a.m. on Solar Sports and 1:30 p.m. to 2:00 p.m. on SolarFlix.

== Former programming ==
=== Shopping programs and segments ===
- A Better You
- Budget Sized
- Gifted!
- Gotta Have It!
- Mandatories
- Picks-of-the-Week
- Project Home
- Shop TV Classics
- Shop TV Faves
- Shop TV Live
- The Easy Kitchen
- The Healthy Way
- The Sale Rack
- This Just In
- What Women Want
- Word

=== Other programs ===
- Auto Focus (Motoring informative; moved to Solar Sports)
- Breakfast with Moms (simulcast on Mom's Radio)
- Business and Leisure (Business and lifestyle informative; moved to Solar Sports)
- Superbrands (Special programming)

== Current air networks ==
- SolarFlix/SBN, as E-Novation TV (since 2004)
- Solar Sports, as E-Novation TV (since 2026)

== Previous aired on these networks ==
- RPN, as Home Shopping Network (2003–15, in association with Solar Entertainment Corporation)
- IBC, as Home Shopping Network/Shop TV (2004–11, 2014–15)
- 2nd Avenue, as Home Shopping Network/Shop TV (2007–18)
- GMA Network, as Shop TV (2015–16, in association with Solar Entertainment Corporation)
- GMA News TV, as Shop TV (2015–19, in association with Solar Entertainment Corporation)
- TV5, as Shop TV (2019)
- BEAM TV, as Shop TV (2016–18)
- AksyonTV, as Shop TV (2016, re-run, 2017–18)
- Jack TV, as Home Shopping Network/Shop TV (2005–20)

== See also ==
- SolarFlix, free TV partner of E-Novation TV
- O Shopping (former rival shopping channel)
