= NBA on NBC =

US television program

- Logo used since 2026
- Also known as: NBC Sunday Night Basketball; Coast 2 Coast Tuesday; Peacock NBA Monday (for Monday night telecasts)
- Genre: American basketball game telecasts
- Directed by: Pierre Moossa
- Presented by: Mike Tirico; Reggie Miller; Jamal Crawford; Zora Stephenson; Noah Eagle; Grant Hill; Ashley ShahAhmadi; Terry Gannon; Michael Grady; Bob Costas; Mark Followill; Jason Benetti; John Michael; Kevin Ray; Kate Scott; Robbie Hummel; Austin Rivers; Derek Fisher; Brian Scalabrine; Brad Daugherty; Jordan Cornette; Mike Fratello; Doc Rivers; Grant Liffmann; John Fanta; Chris Mannix; Maria Taylor; Ahmed Fareed; Carmelo Anthony; Vince Carter; Tracy McGrady; Michael Jordan
- Narrated by: Jim Fagan
- Theme music composer: John Tesh (main theme); Alex Hitchens; Elvis Presley (Sunday Night Basketball opening theme)
- Opening theme: "Roundball Rock" (main theme); A Little Less Conversation by Lenny Kravitz (Sunday Night Basketball opening theme)
- Country of origin: United States
- Original language: English
- No. of seasons: 20

Production
- Executive producer: Sam Flood
- Producer: Frank DiGraci
- Production locations: Various NBA arenas (games and playoff pre-/post-game coverage); NBC Studios, New York City (1990–2002, studio segments, pre-game and post-game shows) NBC Sports Headquarters, Stamford, Connecticut (2025–present, studio segments, pre-game and post-game shows)
- Camera setup: Multi-camera
- Running time: 210 minutes or until game ends (inc. adverts)
- Production company: NBC Sports

Original release
- Network: NBC
- Release: October 30, 1954 – April 7, 1962
- Release: November 3, 1990 – June 12, 2002
- Network: NBC; NBCSN; Peacock; Telemundo, TeleXitos and Universo (Spanish audio/broadcast)
- Release: October 21, 2025 – present

Related
- NBA Showtime; WNBA on NBC; NBA on USA

Logo until 2026

The NBA on NBC is an American television sports presentation show broadcast by NBC. Television broadcasts of National Basketball Association (NBA) games produced by NBC Sports have aired on American broadcast network NBC, under the NBA on NBC branding throughout three incarnations in its history.

The NBA was first televised by NBC from 1954 to 1962. In 1990, the NBA returned to NBC under a multi-year contract which coincided with the dynastic run of Michael Jordan and the Chicago Bulls; the league rose to unprecedented popularity, with ratings surpassing the days of Magic Johnson and Larry Bird in the mid-1980s. NBC's coverage ended after the 2001–02 season after a 12-year run, when NBC was outbid for the broadcast television contract by Disney (via ABC).

In July 2024, it was announced that NBCUniversal had regained rights to the NBA under a new contract, beginning in the 2025–26 season, under the title NBA on NBC and NBA on Peacock respectively, which will see coverage on NBC and streaming platform Peacock. NBCSN was later added in November to televise Monday and some playoff games.

== History ==
=== First iteration (1954–1962) ===
NBC's first coverage tenure with the National Basketball Association began on October 30, 1954, and lasted until April 7, 1962. NBC's very first NBA telecast was a game between the Boston Celtics and Rochester Royals in Rochester.

For the 1954–55 season, Marty Glickman and Lindsey Nelson called all games except on April 9 (Fort Wayne at Syracuse during the playoffs), when Glickman worked with Jim Gordon. Nelson would later write in his autobiography, Hello Everybody, I'm Lindsey Nelson that NBA commissioner Maurice Podoloff would travel to the televised games and, when NBC needed to get in a commercial, he would go up to one of the coaches and say, "Call a timeout," and they had to, since the commissioner ordered it. On March 19, 1955, during the playoffs, NBC gave the national spotlight to the New York Knicks and rising Boston Celtics at New York City's Madison Square Garden.

For the first year of NBC's tenure, the first five weeks of coverage followed a Canadian Football League game. That contract decreed that the network show 13 games (along with presumably the Grey Cup) on Saturday afternoons beginning in late August, and was signed one week after NBC had lost the rights to NCAA football to ABC.

The following year, Lindsey Nelson was paired with Curt Gowdy on commentary for all games except on February 25 (St. Louis at New York), March 3 (Minneapolis at Rochester with Nelson working with Joe Lapchick), and March 24 (Fort Wayne at St. Louis with Nelson working alone). On March 31, 1956, NBC broadcast the first nationally televised NBA Finals game, which was Game 1 of the Philadelphia-Fort Wayne series.

Gowdy and Nelson were retained as the primary broadcast team for NBC in 1956–57 except on March 23 and 30 (St. Louis at Boston), when Nelson worked by himself. While the team of Gowdy and Nelson again did most games in 1957–58, Nelson worked the December 14 telecast (Syracuse at Detroit) with Chick Hearn, who in return, worked the January 11 telecast (Syracuse at Cincinnati) with Gowdy. For the January 18 telecast (Detroit at St. Louis), Nelson worked alone while on February 1 (Syracuse at Minneapolis), Nelson was paired with Bill O'Donnell. Meanwhile, Gowdy worked alone on March 1 (Cincinnati at Philadelphia).

NBC also during the 1957–58 season, broadcast a game in Detroit between Cincinnati and the Pistons on March 15; after this game, on the flight home to Cincinnati, that Maurice Stokes became ill and later suffered a seizure, fell into a coma, and was left permanently paralyzed. This was the delayed reaction from having hit his head in a game three days earlier. Stokes died in April 1970.

In the 1958–59 season, Curt Gowdy worked alone on all games except on March 15 (New York at Syracuse, when Gowdy worked with Bud Palmer), April 5 (Minneapolis at Boston with Lindsey Nelson). The 1959 NBA All-Star Game marked the first time that the All-Star Game was nationally televised. However, NBC only broadcast the second half at 10 p.m. Eastern Time, in lieu of its Friday Night Fights telecast. The fact that the All-Star Game prior to this, was almost always played on a Tuesday night meant that NBC would have had to sacrifice most, if not all, of their evening programming. In the first few years, that would have meant taking off Milton Berle's program, which was starting to slide, but still would have made more money for the network than a pro basketball game. Plus, NBA owners weren't terribly savvy when it came to working with television in this era, so they probably refused network requests to put it in a weekend afternoon slot.

During the 1959–60 season, Curt Gowdy worked alone most on Saturday games while Lindsey Nelson worked alone on most Sunday games. Nelson also worked on Saturday April 2 (St. Louis at Boston) during the playoffs. Marty Glickman meanwhile, worked alone on December 6 (St. Louis at Cincinnati), January 2–3 (New York Knicks at Cincinnati and Boston at Syracuse), February 28 (Philadelphia at Detroit), March 13 (Philadelphia at Syracuse), 20 (Boston at Philadelphia), and 27 (St. Louis at Boston), and April 3 (Boston at St. Louis). Finally, Bill O'Donnell worked alone on March 12 (Minneapolis at Detroit), 19 (St. Louis at Minneapolis), and 26 (Minneapolis at St. Louis).

In the 1960–61 season, Lindsey Nelson was alone on all games except when he worked with Bud Palmer on October 22 (New York at Cincinnati) and 29 (New York at Detroit), November 26 (Syracuse at Boston), December 3 (New York at Syracuse), 10 (Syracuse at Detroit), and 24 (Detroit at Boston). Jerry Doggett helped call games on November 5 (Syracuse at Los Angeles) and 19 (Detroit at Los Angeles). Marty Glickman contributed to commentary on January 8 (Boston at St. Louis), 15 (Philadelphia at Syracuse), 22 (St. Louis at Cincinnati), and 29 (Philadelphia at Boston), February 19 (Boston at Syracuse) and 26 (Boston at Detroit), March 12 (Boston at Syracuse), 19 (Syracuse at Boston), and 26 (Syracuse at Boston), and April 2 (St. Louis at Boston).

For NBC's final season of their first stint with the NBA, Bud Palmer worked alone on commentary on all games except for on February 3 (Cincinnati at New York) and April 7 (Los Angeles at Boston), when he was paired with Bob Wolff.

NBC's ratings during this time period were lukewarm at best. By 1962, NBA ratings for NBC's Saturday afternoon games dipped to 4.8 (9 million viewers) as compared to Sunday afternoon NFL ratings of 10.4 (15 million viewers). As a matter of fact, CBS was at one point, getting better ratings for their National Hockey League (NHL) telecasts than NBC was getting with the NBA. One possible factor for the dipping ratings the fact that NBC's 1960–61 schedule placed the three weakest teams--Cincinnati, Syracuse, and Detroit on television a total of 14 times. In comparison, three of the NBA's best teams--Boston, St. Louis, and Philadelphia—appeared on NBC a total of only seven times.

=== Second iteration (1990–2002) ===
==== Background ====
NBA on NBC logo used from 1990 to 2000.

On November 9, 1989, the NBA reached an agreement with NBC worth US$600 million to broadcast the NBA's games for four years, beginning with the 1990–91 season. On April 28, 1993, NBC extended its exclusive broadcast rights to the NBA with a four-year, $750 million contract.

==== Coverage ====
NBC's coverage of the NBA began on Christmas Day each season, with the exception of the inaugural season in 1990 (which featured a game on November 3, 1990 between the Los Angeles Lakers and the San Antonio Spurs), the 1997–98 season (which included a preseason tournament featuring the Chicago Bulls), the 1998–99 season (as no Christmas games were played due to the 1998–99 NBA lockout), and the final season of NBC's contract in 2001–02 (which included two early season games featuring the return of Michael Jordan to the NBA, but this time as an owner and player for the Washington Wizards). NBC aired the NBA All-Star Game every year (with the exception of 1999, when the game was canceled due to the lockout), usually at 6:00 pm, Eastern Time. In 2002, NBC aired the game an hour earlier (at 5:00 pm, Eastern) due to the Winter Olympics later that evening. Starting in 2000, during the NBA Playoffs, NBC would air tripleheaders on Saturdays and Sundays during the first two weeks of the playoffs. Prior to 2000, NBC would air a doubleheader on Saturday, followed by a tripleheader on Sunday.

On December 30, 2000, NBC aired a rare second December game. The Saturday match was the only time that NBC aired a game between Christmas Day and the start of the regular run of games in February. In 2001, NBC was scheduled to air an October preseason game involving an NBA team playing an international team; that game was canceled due to the September 11 attacks. During the 2001–02 NBA season, NBC added a significant number of Washington Wizards games to its schedule (due to the aforementioned return of Michael Jordan). When Jordan became injured during the middle of the season, NBC replaced the added Wizards games with the games that had been originally on the schedule (for example, a March 2002 game between the Wizards and Orlando Magic was replaced at the last minute with an Indiana Pacers–Sacramento Kings game).

==== Segments ====
NBA on NBC logo used from 2000 to 2002.

The pre-game show for NBC's NBA telecasts was NBA Showtime, a title that was used from 1990 until 2000, with the pre-game being unbranded afterward. Showtime was originally hosted by Bob Costas from the inaugural season of the 1990 contract to the 1995–96 season; Hannah Storm took over as host beginning with the 1996–97 season, who in turn was replaced by Ahmad Rashad in 2001 when Storm went on maternity leave. The video game NBA Showtime: NBA on NBC, by Midway Games, was named after the pregame show.

During the NBA Finals, additional coverage would be immediately available on CNBC, in which the panelists provided an additional half-hour of in-depth game discussions, after the NBC broadcast network's coverage concluded.

The halftime show was sponsored by Prudential Financial (Prudential Halftime Report), and later NetZero (NetZero at the Half) and Verizon Wireless (Verizon Wireless at the Half). The broadcasts also featured a segment during the live games called Miller Genuine Moments, which provided a brief retrospective on a particular historically significant and/or dramatic moment in NBA history; this segment was discontinued towards the end of NBC's coverage. The song used as the soundtrack for the Miller Genuine Moments segment was "Black Hole" by John Tesh. For a brief period in 2001–02, NBC aired a studio segment called 24, in which each analyst (at that time, Pat Croce, Jayson Williams or Mike Fratello) would have 24 seconds to talk about issues concerning the NBA. NBC (in conjunction with completely revamping the pregame show) discontinued the segment in February 2002, after Williams was arrested on murder charges.

==== Ratings ====
During its twelve-year run, the NBA on NBC experienced ratings highs and lows for the NBA. In the 1990s, the NBA Finals ratings were stellar, with the exception of the 1999 Finals. In 1998, the NBA set a Finals ratings record, with an 18.7 household rating for the second Chicago Bulls–Utah Jazz series, the last championship run by the Michael Jordan-led Bulls. The very next year (after a lockout which erased part of the season), the ratings for the 1999 Finals plummeted, marking the beginning of an ongoing period of lower viewership for the league's game telecasts. In 2002, NBC set a record for the highest-rated Western Conference Final, including a 14.2 rating for Game 7 of the series between the Los Angeles Lakers and Sacramento Kings.

NBC's highest-rated regular season game was Michael Jordan's first game back from playing Minor League Baseball; the March 1995 game between the Chicago Bulls and Indiana Pacers scored a 10.9 rating (higher than all but three NBA telecasts on ABC). As a comparison, the first game in Jordan's second comeback (a game against the New York Knicks that aired on TBS opposite the 2001 World Series) scored a rating between a 3.0 and 4.0. NBC's first game of Jordan's second comeback scored ratings similar to that number.

==== Criticisms ====
Several NBA observers accused NBC and the NBA of being biased with only certain teams and individual players. NBC benefited from having all of the Finals it televised involve the large-market Chicago Bulls, Los Angeles Lakers, New York Knicks, New Jersey Nets, Philadelphia 76ers or Houston Rockets; however, smaller-market teams such as those in San Antonio, Sacramento, Phoenix, Seattle, Portland, Utah, Indiana, Orlando, and Milwaukee all made regular appearances on NBC during its run. All nine listed teams made at least one Conference Final with San Antonio, Phoenix, Seattle, Portland, Utah, Indiana, and Orlando making the NBA Finals at least once.

==== Loss of rights to ABC/ESPN ====
Upon the expiration of NBC Sports' contract with the NBA in 2002, the NBA signed a broadcast television rights agreement with ABC, which began airing games in the 2002–03 season. NBC had made a four-year, US$1.3 billion bid in the spring of 2002 to renew its NBA rights, but the NBA instead made the initial six-year deals worth $4 billion with ESPN, ABC, and TNT.

The new media deal at the time highly incentivized airing games on cable television. The major leagues received more money from cable than broadcast, due to the dual revenue stream of subscriptions and ad revenue. NBC could not compete with the combined broadcast and cable deal that Disney had with ESPN and ABC. When NBC's relationship with the NBA ended, their only cable properties then were CNBC and MSNBC. Whereas NBC normally televised 33 regular season games per year, ABC would generally air fewer than 20 regular season games annually. According to NBA Commissioner David Stern, the reduced number of network telecasts was at the NBA's own request since the NBA believed that they would get a higher audience for a single game (in contrast to NBC's tripleheaders). The NBA saw its NBC ratings for the regular season fall from 4.3 in 1999 to 3.0 in 2000. Meanwhile, the playoff ratings dipped from 6.5 to 4.9.

As well as that, NBC began to lose money on the NBA after signing a new media deal in 1998. NBC lost $100 million on the NBA in the 2000–01 season. By December 2001, NBC was projecting a $200-million loss on the 2001–02 season. Additionally, NBC lost $35 million because of the failure of the XFL the previous year. As Charles Barkley summed it up during halftime of Game 1 of the 2002 NBA Finals:

If y'all hadn't wasted all that money on the XFL, y'all would still have basketball.

In response to the impending loss of NBA coverage, NBC Entertainment president Jeff Zucker said:

We lost football two years ago, and we stayed a strong No. 1. We lost baseball, and we stayed a strong No. 1. Now we're about to lose basketball, and I believe we'll stay a strong No. 1. The fact is, it's had no impact on our prime time strength. . . NBC can now program all of Sunday nights without going around basketball. I think that's a huge advantage for us. We haven't been able for the last several years to put a program at 8 o'clock (such as American Dreams) because we've had the NBA.

NBC Sports chairman Dick Ebersol said:

The definition of winning has become distorted. If winning the rights to a property brings with it hundreds of millions of dollars in losses, what have you won? When faced with the prospect of heavy financial losses, we have consistently walked away and have done so again. ... We wish the NBA all the best. We have really enjoyed working with them for more than a decade to build the NBA brand.

Ebersol added:

We walked away from the N.F.L., because it was the right thing to do, and we stayed No. 1 in prime-time in all the important aspects. We walked away from baseball because it was the right thing to do and we don't have to take off our fall shows to show playoff games. The N.B.A. was asking us to lose hundreds of millions of dollars.

NBC network president Randy Falco said:

We have a responsibility to our shareholders.

NBC's final NBA telecast during its second iteration was Game 4 of the 2002 NBA Finals, which closed with highlights from the network's 12-year run with the league, through the Chicago Bulls' dynasty led by Michael Jordan and Scottie Pippen, the retirement of Larry Bird and Magic Johnson and the Los Angeles Lakers' new Shaq/Kobe reign. The final image of the end montage was set in an empty gym, showing a basketball bouncing into the background and ending with the message, "Thanks for the Memories" and a final appearance of the NBA on NBC logo on the bottom. Prior to the sequence, match commentators Marv Albert, Steve Jones and Bill Walton evaluated the end of their NBA contract and of the series. After that, Bob Costas closed the network's last NBA broadcast with the following:

Okay, Marv, thanks very much. And as Marv himself would say, "it should be pointed out" that Marv is celebrating his forty-ninth birthday tonight for a record twelfth consecutive year. Well, another season is in the books. The Lakers' title run continues with perhaps no end in sight. But as Marv said, we have reached the end of our run with the NBA. NBC's twelve years televising the league had been filled with indelible moments. And so, as we say good night, here's an appreciative look back. And for one last time, you've been watching the NBA on NBC.

==== Aftermath ====
From 2002 to 2006, the NBA's ratings on broadcast television (ABC) dropped almost a full ratings point (from nearly a 3.0 average rating to just above a 2.0 rating). NBC averaged a 5.5 average rating during the 2002 NBA playoffs. ABC averaged a 3.3 average rating for the 2005 NBA playoffs.

Within two years of NBC losing the NBA rights, NBC dropped to fourth place in the prime time television rankings for the first time in its history, which was also partly the result of a weaker prime time schedule (outside of Sunday Night Football), and would more or less remain there for almost nine years.

=== Third iteration (2025–present) ===
On July 23, 2024, NBC parent company Comcast confirmed in a conference call with its investors that NBC Sports had secured an agreement with the NBA on an 11-year media rights deal beginning in the 2025–26 season, marking the NBA's return to NBC after a 23-year absence. An official announcement of the agreement was released by the NBA and NBC the following day, alongside other deals with incumbents ABC/ESPN and newcomer Amazon.

Under the initial $2.5 billion per season agreement:

- NBC Sports will carry a total of 100 regular season games per season:
  - Peacock and NBCSN will exclusively stream a package of Monday night games under the Peacock NBA Monday banner. Up to two games a week will be simulcasted on both Peacock and NBCSN, since the latter relaunched on November 17, 2025.
  - NBC will carry a weekly Tuesday night doubleheader known as NBA Coast 2 Coast Tuesday, with games scheduled at 8 p.m. ET/5 p.m. PT and 11 p.m. ET/8 p.m. PT (or 10 p.m. ET/7 p.m. PT, if NBC schedules or flexes in a home game from either Denver Nuggets or Utah Jazz). Both games will stream nationally on Peacock, while individual NBC stations may show one, a guaranteed game involving that team's market, or both games at their discretion (stations would only show one game, if the second game is scheduled for 10 p.m. ET). On the final weeks of December, NBC shifts the doubleheader to 8 p.m. ET and 10:30 p.m. ET (5 p.m. PT and 7:30 p.m. PT) for nationwide broadcasts, in what was branded as Holiday Hoops from the 2026–27 season.
  - NBC will carry an eight-week Sunday Night Basketball package, carrying on from Sunday Night Football after the NFL season.
  - NBC will broadcast opening night, Martin Luther King Jr. Day, Veterans Day, and, starting with the 2026-27 NBA season, Presidents' Day games.
- NBC will have coverage of All-Star Weekend and the All-Star Game, aside from the NBA All-Star Celebrity Game (which continues to air on ESPN).
- During the playoffs, NBC Sports will carry between 22 and 34 first and second-round games and one Conference Finals series in even-numbered years.
  - Approximately half of the playoff games will stream exclusively on Peacock/NBCSN.
  - Doubleheaders can be televised by NBC, only in the first round.

NBC revived the NBA Showtime title for its pre-game show. For Sunday Night Basketball games, NBC airs Basketball Night in America (in reference to the Sunday Night Football pre-game show Football Night in America) from the site of the game. Prior to the season, NBC announced that Michael Jordan would join its coverage as a special contributor, appearing in one-on-one interview segments with Mike Tirico known as MJ: Insights to Excellence. The segments were filmed as a single long-form interview, with excerpts being aired as individual segments throughout the season.

NBC adopted an on-air presentation designed to blend influence from the 1990s iteration of the NBA on NBC with modern design trends, described internally as a combination of "heritage with innovation". This included a flat design-based graphics system that highlights team colors and logos (with color schemes and consistent circular "medallions" configured for all potential jersey combinations for each team), and animations intended to reflect the "physical nature of the sport". NBC revived John Tesh's "Roundball Rock" as the theme music, with a title sequence featuring a rendition of the "laser" peacock animation from the original NBA on NBC intro—beginning as a recreation of the original sequence in a 4:3 aspect ratio, before transforming to widescreen and a modern rendition of the design for the intro proper.

=== Statistics ===
Games televised / television contracts per season (NBC)
Season	1990–91	1991–92	1992–93	1993–94	1994–95	1995–96	1996–97	1997–98	1998–99	1999–2000	2000–01	2001–02	2025–26	2026–27	2027–28	2028–29	2029–30	2030–31	2031–32
Games	46	52	55	55	54	54	54	54	58	71	69	69	100
Contracts	$601 million/4 years				$892 million/4 years				$1.616 billion/4 years				$27.5 billion/11 years

== Announcers ==
=== 1990–1997 ===
NBC's first broadcast team of the 1990s–2000s era was made up of Marv Albert and Mike Fratello, with Ahmad Rashad serving as sideline reporter. Other broadcasters at the time included Dick Enberg and Steve "Snapper" Jones, both of whom comprised NBC's "B" team. Aside from Rashad, Jim Gray and Hannah Storm also handled sideline reporting duties; before becoming the television voice of the Spurs, Lakers and Pelicans, Joel Meyers also started as a sideline reporter for NBC. Bob Costas presided as host of the network's pre-game show, NBA Showtime, while also providing play-by-play as a fill-in when necessary. During the Playoffs, Don Criqui and Joel Meyers were also used, with Criqui for play-by-play and Meyers mainly as a sideline analyst.

In 1992, shortly after announcing his retirement, basketball legend Earvin "Magic" Johnson became a top game analyst (alongside the likes of Enberg, Albert and Fratello); however, his performance was heavily criticized. Among the complaints were his apparently poor diction skills, his tendency for "stating the obvious", his habitual references to his playing days, and an overall lackluster chemistry with his broadcasting partners. Johnson would ultimately be slowly phased out of the NBA on NBC after helping commentate the 1993 NBA Finals.

In 1993, Mike Fratello left the booth (to become the head coach of the Cleveland Cavaliers) and was replaced with Matt Guokas. Albert and Guokas broadcast the 1994 NBA Finals and were joined for the 1995 NBA Finals by Bill Walton. Albert, Guokas and Walton, while not working regular season games together (Walton usually worked games with Steve Jones and play-by-play announcers Dick Enberg, Tom Hammond or Greg Gumbel), broadcast the next two Finals (1996 and 1997) together in a three-man booth.

While Marv Albert served as the lead announcer for NBC during this period, he did not call the NBA All-Star Game until 1995. Albert was initially slated to call the 1991 game, but missed the game due to the death of his mother. Instead, Bob Costas took on play-by-play duties while simultaneously working as a studio host for the game. From 1992 to 1994, "B" team announcer Dick Enberg called the All-Star Game.

=== 1998–2000 ===
1997 was the last time Marv Albert called the NBA Finals for NBC during the decade, as an embarrassing sex scandal forced NBC to fire Albert before the start of the 1997–1998 season. To replace Albert, NBC tapped studio host Bob Costas for play-by-play. Matt Guokas did not return to his post as main color commentator and was replaced by NBA legend Isiah Thomas; Costas was replaced on the pre-game show by Hannah Storm, whom she replaced in the 1997 NBA Finals. Midway through the season, Costas and Thomas were joined by recently fired Detroit Pistons coach Doug Collins. Collins served to take some weight off Thomas, who was considered by some to be uncomfortable in the role of lead analyst. Thomas, in particular, was singled out for his soft voice and often stammered analysis. Greg Gumbel remained on NBC as its secondary announcer, but left after the All-Star break and rejoined CBS Sports following the network's acquisition of American Football Conference rights from NBC. As a result, Tom Hammond stepped in as the new secondary announcer, a role he held for the remainder of Costas' run as a lead play-by-play voice.

The team of Costas, Thomas, and Collins worked the major games that season, including the 1998 NBA Finals (which set an all-time ratings record for the NBA). Mike Breen, who was backup announcer to Albert on MSG Network's New York Knicks broadcasts, was hired to do select playoff games that year and was later promoted to backup announcer status for the rest of the NBA's run on NBC. For the 1998–99 season, Thomas was moved to the studio, while Costas and Collins made up the lead team. The 1998–1999 season, which was marred by a lengthy lockout (which resulted in the regular season being shortened to 50 games) included the low-rated 1999 NBA Finals between the San Antonio Spurs and the New York Knicks. Albert was brought back for the 1999–2000 season, making a return which included calling that year's lead Christmas Day game between the San Antonio Spurs and the Los Angeles Lakers from Staples Center. Albert split duties with both NBC and Turner Sports for the remainder of his NBC tenure, having been hired by Turner the previous year to call games for TBS and TNT; he would remain with the latter network until his retirement in 2021.

=== 2000–2001 ===
The 2000–2001 season brought to an end to Bob Costas' direct role with the NBA on NBC (although Costas worked playoff games for the next two seasons and returned to host NBC's coverage for the 2002 NBA Finals). Costas deferred to Marv Albert, allowing Albert to again be the lead broadcaster for the NBA, and stayed on only to deliver interviews and special features. On the studio front, Hannah Storm left her position as studio host to go on maternity leave, with Ahmad Rashad taking over for Storm; Isiah Thomas left NBC to become coach of the Indiana Pacers. Joining Rashad were former Phoenix Suns player Kevin Johnson and former NBA coach P. J. Carlesimo, with Carlesimo also filling in as backup analyst during select playoff games until 2002. Marv Albert joined Doug Collins as the lead broadcast team, and the two broadcast the 2001 NBA Finals, which had the highest ratings for a Finals match since 1998. After the season, Collins was hired away from NBC by the Washington Wizards, which forced the network to move the longtime secondary color duo of Steve Jones and Bill Walton to the lead broadcast team with Albert.

During the 2001 NBA Finals between the Los Angeles Lakers and the Philadelphia 76ers, NBC decided to cross-promote its NBA coverage with its then-popular quiz show The Weakest Link. Two 10-minute editions of The Weakest Link aired during halftime of Games 2 and 3, featuring Bob Costas, Bill Walton and Steve Jones as contestants, along with Charlotte Hornets guard Baron Davis and WNBA team Los Angeles Sparks's center, Lisa Leslie.

=== 2001–2002 ===
The 2001–2002 season featured several anomalies, as NBC started their coverage on the first Saturday of the season, for the first time since 1991. The reason for this was NBA legend Michael Jordan's return to playing, this time for the Washington Wizards. NBC covered an early December game featuring Jordan's Wizards as well, which marked the first time a broadcast television network aired more than one pre-Christmas NBA game since CBS in the 1980s.

That year also marked the return of Hannah Storm from maternity leave, with her and Ahmad Rashad alternating as studio hosts throughout the 2002 season. That year, NBC's studio team consisted of Rashad and Storm with former Philadelphia 76ers owner Pat Croce, the returning Mike Fratello, and former player Jayson Williams. The tandem stayed together through the 2002 NBA All-Star Game. During the week between the All-Star Game and NBC's next scheduled telecast, Williams was arrested after shooting and killing his limousine driver. He was promptly fired by NBC, which also did not return Croce or Fratello to studio coverage. Instead, the network brought in Tom Tolbert, who had only recently been added to NBC Sports as a third-string analyst paired with Mike Breen. Tolbert stayed on as the lone studio analyst through the end of the season, and won acclaim by several in the media, including USA Today sports columnist Rudy Martzke. Hannah Storm was not able to anchor the 2002 NBA All-Star Game as she was on assignment at the 2002 Winter Olympics in Salt Lake City serving as daytime studio host; Rashad solo anchored from the studio.

In June 2002, Rashad told the Los Angeles Times, in an interview conducted before the 2002 NBA Finals began, that he would be ending his 20-year run with NBC Sports, after hosting the pre-game show for Game 3 of the Finals. Hannah Storm, meanwhile, covered the 2002 NBA Finals as host of the CNBC post-game show.

Two days before NBC was to begin its playoff coverage, both Marv Albert and Mike Fratello, returning from working a Philadelphia 76ers–Indiana Pacers game on TNT, were seriously injured in a limousine accident. That week, NBC juggled its announcing teams, which resulted in Bob Costas and Paul Sunderland working some early-round playoff games, paired with Mike Dunleavy. Fratello would return to TNT after several days, and Albert returned to NBC for Game 1 of the Western Conference Semi-finals between the Dallas Mavericks and Sacramento Kings.

The season would also turn out to be NBC's last with the NBA until the 2025-26 season. In January 2002, the league announced a six-year agreement with The Walt Disney Company and AOL Time Warner, which resulted in the broadcast television rights being acquired by ABC. That year, NBC's playoff ratings were much higher than in previous years, including tallying record-high ratings for the 2002 Western Conference Finals. Those high ratings did not translate to the Finals, which scored their lowest ratings in over two decades.

=== 2025–present ===
For its revived NBA coverage, NBC Sports appointed Mike Tirico to be its lead play-by-play commentator. He had previously called NBA games for ESPN and ABC from 2002 to 2016. For his first season, he is expected to call one or more games per week after his commitments to Sunday Night Football, Super Bowl LX, and the 2026 Winter Olympics end. Before then, he will call select games such as the NBA season opener. NBC Sports additionally appointed Noah Eagle as its number two play-by-play announcer, where he is expected to call games throughout the season. This includes the 2026 NBA All-Star Game. During the fall, he will call games in addition to handling duties for Big Ten Saturday Night. Terry Gannon, Michael Grady, Mark Followill, Kate Scott, John Michael, Kevin Ray and John Fanta were also appointed as play-by-play announcers. Starting with the 2026 NBA playoffs, MLB on NBC lead announcer Jason Benetti was added to the rotation. For game analysts, NBC Sports' roster includes Reggie Miller, Jamal Crawford, Grant Hill, Robbie Hummel, Austin Rivers, Derek Fisher, Brian Scalabrine, and Brad Daugherty. As NBC's top two game analysts, Crawford and Miller are expected to work one or more games per week throughout the season. NBC's team of sideline reporters consist of Zora Stephenson, Ashley ShahAhmadi, Grant Liffmann, and Jordan Cornette. College basketball play-by-play announcer John Fanta also joined as an occasional reporter. Maria Taylor will serve as the primary studio host for NBA games on Sunday and Tuesday nights, having previously served the same role for ESPN's NBA Countdown. Monday night games on Peacock will be hosted by Ahmed Fareed. Former NBA All-Stars Carmelo Anthony, Vince Carter, and Tracy McGrady will join NBC as full-time studio analysts, while Rivers and Scalabrine will make occasional appearances in studio as well. Former NBA players Isiah Thomas, Kelenna Azubuike, Chris Bosh, WNBA star Caitlin Clark, and rapper Snoop Dogg have also made select guest appearances on NBC and Peacock. For digital coverage, NBC also partnered with Enjoy Basketball to create a new weekday programming block.

Former NBA on NBC personalities like Bob Costas, Marv Albert, and Tom Hammond have made occasional appearances narrating opening teases prior to select games.

The Monday-night games feature an "On the Bench" commentary setup similar to the "Inside the Glass" feature from the former NHL on NBC, in which the two analysts will be positioned behind each team's bench with access to their respective assistant coach.

=== Voice-over artists ===
Jim Fagan provided voice-over work for NBC's NBA coverage, in particular the introduction "This is the NBA on NBC". He also did several voice-over promotions for the network's game broadcasts. Les Marshak and Mitch Phillips also did voice-over work for the broadcasts, primarily for promotions.

In 2025, as part of its return to NBA coverage, NBC Sports revealed that it had received permission from the family of Fagan (who had died in 2017) to digitally clone his voice for on-air use during its NBA broadcasts and promos.

== Music ==
The theme music for the NBA on NBC broadcasts is "Roundball Rock", composed by new-age artist John Tesh. The instrumental piece, first composed in 1990 for NBC, soundtracked the network's NBA coverage from 1990 to 2002. During periods when NBC has not broadcast the NBA, it has used the theme for its Olympic basketball coverage, first in 2008 and then in every Summer Olympics since 2016.

"Roundball Rock" returned as NBC's theme music for its revived coverage. The Sunday Night Basketball package will also feature a reworked version of Elvis Presley's song, "A Little Less Conversation", performed by Lenny Kravitz, following the example of Carrie Underwood's opening theme for Sunday Night Football.

== WNBA on NBC ==
NBC showed Women's National Basketball Association (WNBA) games from 1997 to 2002 as part of their NBA on NBC coverage before the league transferred the rights to ABC/ESPN. The network is set to return to airing WNBA games in 2026 as part of NBC's latest 11-year media rights agreement with the NBA.

== NBA coverage on other NBC-owned outlets ==
=== Telemundo Deportes ===
Following NBC's $2.7 billion purchase of Telemundo Communications Group from Sony Pictures and Liberty Media on October 11, 2001, Deportes Telemundo began to gradually be integrated into NBC Sports, although it would maintain sports programming rights separate from the main NBC broadcast network and its sister cable channels. Under NBC (which ironically lost the rights to the league that year to ABC), on August 20, 2002, Telemundo signed a three-year agreement with the NBA for the Spanish language broadcast rights to 15 NBA and up to ten WNBA regular season games; Telemundo and the NBA did not renew the deal upon its expiration following the 2004–05 season.

Beginning in 2025, Telemundo will return to airing select NBA games as a part of NBC's latest 11-year media rights agreement. For the first season, Telemundo will air 10 of NBC's 11 Sunday Night Basketball games, the 2026 NBA All-Star Game, and the NBA's Mexico Game. The Telemundo NBA broadcasting team is led by play-by-play announcer Álvaro Martín alongside expert analysts Greivis Vásquez (former NBA player) and Diego Balado. The on-air crew also features courtside reporter Diego Arrioja and host Adriana Monsalve.

=== NBC Sports Regional Networks ===
Since 2011, NBCUniversal owns and operates a group of regional sports networks under the branding NBC Sports Regional Networks (formerly known as Comcast SportsNet). This includes four networks that currently hold local TV broadcast rights with individual NBA teams: NBC Sports Bay Area (Golden State Warriors), NBC Sports Boston (Boston Celtics), NBC Sports California (Sacramento Kings), and NBC Sports Philadelphia (Philadelphia 76ers).

Records
Preceded by DuMont	NBA network broadcast partner 1954–1962	Succeeded by SNI
Preceded by CBS	NBA network broadcast partner 1990–2002	Succeeded by ABC
Preceded by None	NBA network broadcast partner 2025–present with ABC	Succeeded by Incumbent
Preceded by TNT	NBA pay television carrier 2025–present with ESPN and Prime Video	Succeeded by Incumbent
