= Jim Fagan (actor) =

American actor (1944-2017)

- Born: James Fagan; December 25, 1944; Windber, PA
- Died: January 19, 2017 (aged 72); LaGrangeville, NY
- Education: West Virginia University
- Occupations: Actor, voiceover
- Years active: 1972–2010
- Known for: Voice of The NBA on NBC
- Children: 2

James Fagan (December 25, 1944 – January 19, 2017) was an American actor, and voice-over artist.

Fagan attended West Virginia University, on a football scholarship. After breaking his leg freshman year, he returned to play in 1963. Fagan remembered playing against Navy and Roger Staubach. The following year, he got sick, and was told he couldn't play football anymore. He graduated with a fine arts bachelor's degree in 1967.

Fagan spent his career doing voiceover work for the National Football League, the National Basketball Association, the Olympics, NBC Sports, the World Wrestling Federation, the Mountaineer Sports Network, The People's Court and hundreds of commercials. He was also a member of the Order of Vandalia, WVU's highest honor.

Fagan worked as ring announcer for the Westminster Kennel Club Dog Show in 2010, taking over for Michael J. LaFave. He faced criticism for his mispronouncing Schipperke. LaFave returned to the post the following year.

In the 1990s, Fagan was known for being the voiceover announcer for the NBA on NBC, narrating its opening sequence. In May 2025, with its acquisition of a new NBA rights agreement, NBC Sports announced that it had secured permission from Fagan's family to create an audio deepfake of his voice for use during broadcasts. NBC Sports president Rick Cordella considered Fagan's voice to be "unique and recognizable", and symbolic of that era of the NBA.
