= NBA Entertainment =

Production arm of the National Basketball Association

NBA Entertainment is the production arm of the National Basketball Association (NBA) and produces many NBA-related films including team championship videos and blooper and entertainment reels. Founded in 1982, it used to be associated with CBS/Fox Video, which was signing an agreement in 1987, before changing its distribution partner to Warner Bros. whose Turner Sports division ran its website and was one of its major broadcast partners.

== Films ==
The following films are produced by NBA Entertainment.

- That Magic Season: 1980 NBA Playoffs and Finals (1980)
- The Dynasty Renewed: 1981 NBA Playoffs and Finals (1981)
- Something to Prove: 1982 NBA Playoffs and Finals (1982)
- That Championship Feeling: 1983 NBA Playoffs and Finals (1983)
- Pride And Passion: 1984 NBA Playoffs and Finals (1984)
- Return To Glory: 1985 NBA Playoffs and Finals (1985)
- Sweet Sixteen: 1986 NBA Playoffs and Finals (1986)
- Home of the Brave: The 1986–87 Boston Celtics
- The Drive for Five: The 1986–87 Los Angeles Lakers
- Basketball's Air Force: The 1986–87 Atlanta Hawks
- Hanging Tough: The 1986–87 Houston Rockets
- Higher Ground: The 1987–88 Chicago Bulls (1988)
- Bouncing Back: The 1987–88 Dallas Mavericks (1988)
- Bad Boys: The 1987–88 Detroit Pistons (1988)
- Back to Back: The 1987–88 Los Angeles Lakers (1988)
- Michael Jordan: Come Fly With Me (1988)
- Dazzling Dunks and Basketball Bloopers (1988)
- NBA Awesome Endings (1989)
- NBA Superstars (1989)
- Kareem: Reflections From Inside (1989)
- New York's Game: The History of The New York Knicks (1989)
- History of the NBA (1989)
- The All New Dazzling Dunks and Basketball Bloopers (1989) Note: this show featured a parody of the History of the NBA called the Unofficial History of the NBA.
- Return to Rip City: The 1989–90 Portland Trail Blazers
- Pure Pistons: The 1989–90 Detroit Pistons
- Sports Illustrated Presents Milestones: Record Breakers of the NBA (1990)
- Sports Illustrated Presents Champions: The NBA Greatest Teams (1990)
- Sports Illustrated Presents Classic Confrontations in the NBA (1990)
- Michael Jordan's Playground (1990)
- Learning to Fly: The 1990–91 Chicago Bulls (1991)
- Super Slams of the NBA (1991)
- Larry Bird: A Basketball Legend (1991)
- Magic Johnson: Always Showtime (1991) Note: this film would be updated in 1996 to include his first retirement, his 1992 Olympic experience and his return to the NBA in 1996.
- NBA Superstars 2 (1992)
- Untouchabulls: The 1991–92 Chicago Bulls (1992)
- NBA Dream Team (1992)
- Silver Streak: The First 25 Years of the Phoenix Suns (1992)
- Michael Jordan: Air Time (1993)
- NBA Jam Session (1993)
- Three-Peat: The 1992–93 Chicago Bulls (1993)
- NBA Guts and Glory (1993)
- Patrick Ewing Standing Tall (1993)
- Sir Charles (1994)
- Clutch City: The 1993–94 Houston Rockets (1994)
- NBA Below the Rim (1995)
- Shawn Kemp: The Reign Man (1995)
- Hakeem the Dream (1995)
- NBA Jams: The Music Videos (1995)
- Double Clutch: The 1994–95 Houston Rockets
- NBA Legacy: Living Legends to Rising Stars (1995)
- NBA Furious Finishes (1996)
- Michael Jordan: Above and Beyond (1996)
- UnStop-a-Bulls: The 1995–96 Chicago Bulls (1996)
- NBA At 50 (1996)
- Space Jam (1996) animated by Warner Bros. Feature Animation
- NBA In the Paint (1997)
- Chicago Bulls 1996-97 NBA Championship Season (1997)
- Unforgettabulls: The 1997-98 Chicago Bulls (1998)
- Michael Jordan: His Airness (1999)
- Go Spurs Go: San Antonio Spurs 1998–1999 NBA Champions
- Greatest NBA Finals Moments (1999)
- Los Angeles Lakers 1999-2000 NBA Champions (2000)
- Los Angeles Lakers 2000-01 NBA Champions (2001)
- NBA Ultimate Player (2001)
- Los Angeles Lakers 2001-02 NBA Champions (2002)
- Like Mike (2002)
- San Antonio Spurs 2002-03 NBA Champions (2003)
