= List of programs broadcast by INC TV =

The following is a list of the programs currently broadcast on INC TV, a free-to-air religious channel owned by the Christian Era Broadcasting Service International, a broadcast evangelization arm of the Iglesia ni Cristo. Selected programs are also aired on Net 25 on weekday afternoons and evenings; weekend mornings, afternoons and evenings; and overnight hours.

== Current programming ==
=== Preaching and Bible-based discussions ===
- Ang Gampanin ng Pamamahala sa Iglesia Ni Cristo (2022)
- Ang Iglesia ni Cristo* (2005)
- Ang Matuod Nga Pagtuo (2018)
- Ang Pagbubunyag (2012)
- Ang Tamang Daan* (2012)
- INCMS (2021)
- Biblia Ang Sasagot* (2018)
- Daan ng Buhay* (2021)
- El Mensaje* (2013)
- Gabay sa Mabuting Asal* (2005)
- Iglesia ni Cristo International Edition* (2012)
- Iglesia ni Cristo and the Bible* (2005)
- Kini Ang Kamatuoran (2018)
- Pasugo* (2005)
- Ti Pudno A Dalan (2018)
- The Answer 答案 (2018)
- Ang Permanenteng Solusyon (The Permanent Solution) 105th Anniversary Special (2019)
- Bro. EVM 10th Anniversary Special the Only Basis in Serving God (2019)
- Reconnect (2018–2019; 2020)
- The Message Special (2010–2012; 2020)
- Ang Kahalagahan Ng Mapabilang Sa Gawain Ng Sugo Ng Diyos Iglesia Ni Cristo 107th Anniversary Special (2021)
- The Message (2012)
- Iglesia Ni Cristo 108th Anniversary an INCTV Special (2022)
- A Mensagem (2021)
- INCMS Special* (2021)
- FYM 134 (2020)
- 136th Birth Anniversary of Brother Felix Y. Manalo* (2022)
- Le Rendez-Vous (2012–2013, 2022)
- That's In the Bible (2012–2020, 2024)
- Faith & Family (2026)

=== Church-centered newscasts ===
- Worldwide Lingap Sa Mamamayan Special Coverage (2022)
- Bureau Reports (2018)
- CFO Today (2021)
- CFO Updates (2021)
- INC News Junior (2023)
- Executive News*** (2012)
- Executive News Feature Stories (2012)
- Former Pastors and Religious Leaders Special Features (2017)
- The Good News (2018)
- Ibalita ang Pagliligtas (2018)
- Iglesia ni Cristo News Live (2018)
- Iglesia ni Cristo News Live Special Coverage (2014)
- Iglesia ni Cristo News Weekend (2018)
- INCTV News Update (2013)
- INCNews World (2018)
- Maayong Balita (2014–2021)
- Iglesia Ni Cristo 105th Anniversary Special Coverage (2019)
- INC News Special Report (2018)
- Worldwide Walk Special Coverage (2018)
- Iglesia Ni Cristo News Highlights (2018)
- The Good News Special Report (2019)
- INC Unity Games (2012)
- COVID-19 Bulletin (2021)
- NEGH Bulletin (2022)
- The INC Giving Show (2012–2019, 2024)

=== Convert stories and documentaries ===
- Blessed Moments 10 Years of Dynamic Leadership (2019)
- Itanyag (2014)
- Landas ng Buhay: Drama Anthology*** (2012)
- Paninidigan'*** (2012)
- Stories of Faith (2012, 2018)
- Continuing Legacy (2019)
- Eye N' See (2019)
- Paglingap Sa Katuwa (2022)
- God's Great Work in Africa (2022)
- YOLANDA: Ang Pagbangon: An INCTV Documentary Special (2018)
- 10 Days in Africa (2019)
- Balik-Tanaw 2018 the INCTV Year-End Special (2018)
- Look 2019 INCTV Year-End Special (2019)
- Turning Point* (2021)
- Livelihood Programs During Pandemic (2021)
- Iglesia Ni Cristo First Eco-Farming Project in the USA (2021)
- INCTV Special (2021)
- INCTV Documentary (2021)
- Mga Dakilang Gawa Ng Diyos Sa Africa (2022)

=== Informative and edutainment ===
- Let's Talk (2011)
- INC Kids Corner (2014)
- INC Kids Adventures* (2022)
- Christian Society for the Deaf* (2018)
- Christian Society for the Differently-Abled (2026)
- Don't Give Up* (2020)
- INC TV News Update(2018)
- Iglesia Ni Cristo Chronicles (2005-2012-2025)
- INCTV Public Service (2013)
- Let's Talk International (2012)
- Lingap sa Mamamayan*** (2012)
- Lingap Sa Visayas (2022)
- NegosUniversity (2020)
- Mr. and Mrs. Chef Stay At Home Edition*** (2013–2016; 2018–present)
- Pundasyon*** (2014)
- Trabaho Ko 'To!*** (2013–2016; 2018–2019, 2020)
- Unlad (2018)
- Time To Draw Live (2018–2019; 2020)
- CFO Day @ CEBSI (2020)
- Your Light Forever* (2020)
- #NewNormal* (2021)
- Lingap Stories / Lingap Updates* (2021)
- INC Unity Games* (2012)

=== Music ===
- Gen INC (2026)
- Musikoncert (2021)
- Blast From The Past (2025)
- INC Music Videos (2019)
- INCTV Interactive Roadshow (2022)
- Iglesia Ni Cristo International Voice Competition (2019)
- INC Sanctuary Choir Concert (2026)
- INC Tabernacle Choir Concert (2026)
- CFO Day (2022)
- Spotlight (2013)
- Resonate: Music That Matters (2017–2025)
- Resonate (2022)
- 108th (2022)
- Musical Concert (2022)
- INC A Capella 6th Anniversary Concert (2020)
- Songs Of Faith, Love & Hope: Kadiwa International Edition (2023)
- Iglesia Ni Cristo 107th Anniversary Special (2021)
- Promoting Christian Culture (2020)
- INConcert (2020)
- Little Juan's Playlist Stay-At-Home Edition* (2020)
- INC Music Videos (2010–2012; 2018–2019; 2020)
- Unity Junction Radio (2020–2023)
- MusiKo Songs
- MusiKo*** (2019)
  - MusiKcover Musikover*** (2021)
- United With the Church Administration (2020)
- EVM Awards* (2021)
- FYM 136 Special Concert (55th Anniversary of Ecclesiastical District of Quezon East)* (2022)

=== Movie block ===
- INCinema 2023 (2013)
- FYM 130 LEGACY Iglesia Ni Cristo Short Film Series Commemorating the 130th Birth Anniversary of Brother Felix Y. Manalo (2018)
- CEBSI Films Classics (2025)
- Felix Manalo (film)
- Kapayapaan Sa Gitna Ng Digmaan (2017)
- Rendebu (2018)

=== Drama ===
- L.I.F.E.: Love, Inspiration, Faith, Entertainment (2020)
- NINGAS: Mga Dakilang Kasaysayan Ng Mga Ministro Ng Diyos* (2020)

=== Radio shows ===
- INC Radio Bulletin International (2015)
- Masayang Tahanan (2015)
- INCRadio Cafe (2026)

=== Upcoming programs ===
- INC News Ilokano (2025)

(*) also aired on Net 25 (owned by Eagle Broadcasting Corporation, sister station of Iglesia ni Cristo through Christian Era Broadcasting Service International.)
(***) also aired on Net 25 (international & local)
NOTE: Some INC programming also aired on Net 25, during sign-off hours (only for cable and satellite TV, while analog and digital free TV is some programming of INC aired on daytime/afternoon time/primetime).

== Previously aired programs ==
- AveNEU (2016–2023–2025)
- Blessed Love (2020–2021)
- Blueprint (2018–2019)
- Executive News Special (2021–2022)
- CEBSI Academy Online (2020–2021)
- CFO Life (2020)
- CFO News (2018–2021)
- Christian Family Youth Summit (2022)
- Church News Junior (2018–2020)
- Church News Kids Edition (2015–2017)
- Church News Live (2014–2017)
- Church News Special Report (2012–2018)
- Church News Weekend (2015–2018)
- Faith Speaks (2012–2022)
- Face the Truth (2012)
- Finish Line (2014–2015)
- GEM TV News (2005–2012)
- Gourmade At Home (2021–2023)
- #Hashtag Bureau Edition*** (2013–2022)
- #Hashtag Stay At Home Edition (2020–2022)
- INC Media (2017–2020)
- INC News Live Update (2018–2019)
- INC Playlist App Live (2021–2023)
- INCMV AWARDS (2020–2024)
- Insight (2018–2020)
- Itanyag Ang Pagliligtas (2014–2015)
- Let's Talk International (2018–2022)
- Noteworthy (2022, 2024–2025)
- One For All, All For One (2022)
- Pananampalataya, Pag-asa at Pag-ibig (2011–2012)
- Profile (2014–2017)
- Songs Of Faith, Love, & Hope: Binhi Edition* (2018)
- Songs Of Faith, Love, & Hope: Kadiwa Edition* (2018)
- Songs Of Faith, Love, & Hope: Husband & Wife Edition* (2017)
- Songs Of Faith, Love, & Hope: PNK Edition* (2019)
- Songs Of Faith, Love, & Hope: At Home Edition* (2020)
- Songs Of Faith, Love, & Hope: Christian Family Edition* (2019)
- Songs Of Faith, Love, & Hope: Lights Of The World Edition (2020)
- Songs Of Faith, Love, & Hope: Kadiwa & Binhi International Edition (2021)
- Songs Of Faith, Love & Hope: Buklod Edition (2022)
- Songs Of Faith, Love & Hope: Binhi Edition (2023)
- Taga Rito Kami (2012–2018)
- The Kadiwa Show (2018–2020)
