= DZEM =

Radio station in Metro Manila, Philippines

INC Radio (DZEM)
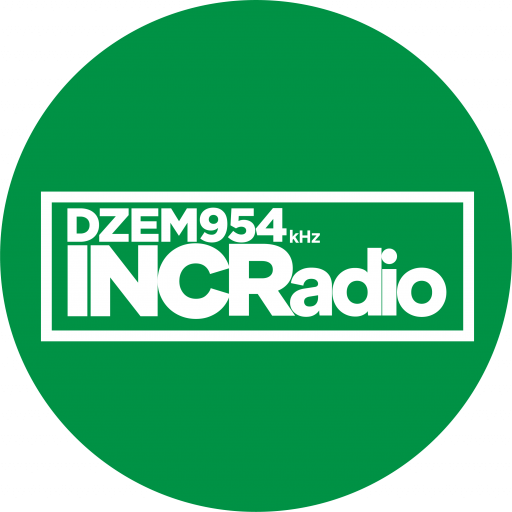
- Quezon City; Philippines
- Broadcast area: Mega Manila and surrounding areas
- Frequency: 954 kHz
- Branding: INC Radio DZEM 954

Programming
- Languages: Filipino, English
- Format: Religious (Iglesia ni Cristo)

Ownership
- Owner: Christian Era Broadcasting Service International
- Sister stations: DZCE-TV (INC TV)

History
- First air date: February 10, 1969
- Former frequencies: 1520 kHz (1969–1971); 1460 kHz (1971–1975); 1360 kHz (1975–1978); 1422 kHz (1978–1987)
- Call sign meaning: Eraño G. Manalo

Technical information
- Licensing authority: NTC
- Power: 40,000 watts

Links
- Website: http://incradio.iglesianicristo.net

DZEM (954 AM) INC Radio is a radio station owned and operated by Christian Era Broadcasting Service International, the religious broadcast arm of the Iglesia ni Cristo in the Philippines. The station's studio is located within the grounds of the Iglesia ni Cristo Central Office complex at No. 1, Central Avenue, Brgy. New Era, Quezon City; its transmitter is located at Brgy. Paliwas, Obando, Bulacan.

== History ==
DZEM began its broadcast on February 10, 1969, on 1520 kHz with a power of 10,000 watts. Known for its religious and secular programs, since the late 1970s, it has received various commendations, plaques, and honors from the broadcast industry like the Broadcast Media Council (BMC), now the Kapisanan ng mga Brodkaster ng Pilipinas (KBP); and from the different private and government agencies.

DZEM is also known as the most widely traveled radio station in Metro Manila in terms of both frequency and broadcast studio. Its first home was in Barrio Ugong del Monte, Quezon City. On June 3, 1971, it moved to the basement of the Iglesia ni Cristo Central Office in Diliman, Quezon City. Shortly afterwards, it acquired a new frequency, 1460 kHz. On May 10, 1975, DZEM once again moved at the third floor of the Iglesia ni Cristo Development Center Building at Carlos Palanca St., Quiapo, Manila. After a month, it also changed its frequency to 1360 kHz. Then in November 1978, as a result of band adjustments, DZEM had again changed its frequency to 1422 kHz due to the switch of the Philippine AM dial from the NARBA-mandated 10 kHz spacing to the 9 kHz rule implemented by the Geneva Frequency Plan of 1975. On May 9, 1985, the station found a new home – the third floor of Maligaya Building 2 at 887 EDSA, Quezon City. It acquired the frequency of 954 kHz on April 27, 1987 (formerly used by ACWS-UBN to operate DWBC-AM; it later moved to 1422 kHz until 1999), which it still uses today. By 2013, the station officially transferred from Maligaya Building 2 in EDSA, to its new home in Barn Studio Building, New Era University Campus, #9 Central Avenue, New Era, Quezon City. With the move to its present home, on May 10, 2013, it was formally renamed INC Radio DZEM 954. It has since moved back to the Iglesia ni Cristo Central Office, with the Barn Studio now being used as a campus of the New Era University College of Communication.

On September 17, 2014, the station officially broadcast an Evangelical Mission on Air, simulcast over INCTV and the internet over incmedia.org, with a later encore telecast for international listeners. INC Radio USA, the US arm of the station, started its broadcasts on October 26, 2014, and on the following day, the station officially transitioned to 24-hour broadcasting after years of 20-hour broadcasts, while also doing the first ever TV-radio simulcast in its history, in celebration of its 45th anniversary; however, DZEM radio continues to operate on a permanent 20 hours daily broadcast via terrestrial radio.

DZEM celebrated its golden jubilee anniversary in 2019. Beginning in 2020, DZEM began to diversify its broadcasts to include productions from outside its traditional broadcast area.

In 2024, the INCRadio brand was added to DZEM station identifications on its livestreaming platforms. Previously the brand had been adopted in the 2010s to match those of its TV counterpart.

== See also ==
- Christian Era Broadcasting Service International
- DZEC Radyo Agila 1062
- Eagle Broadcasting Corporation
- Iglesia ni Cristo
- INC TV
- Net 25
- Eagle FM 95.5
