= Anita Ramos Camba =

Filipino television director

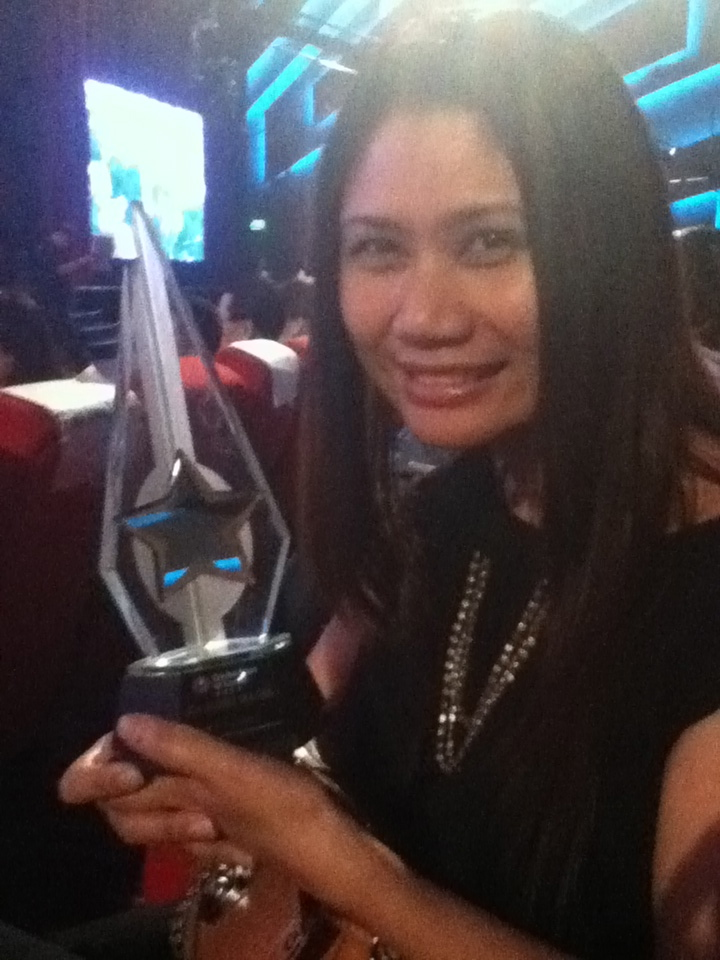
- Camba at the Philippine Movie and Press Club Star Awards for TV in 2011
- Born: Anita Alcantara Ramos; April 13, 1979 (age 47); Casile, Nueva Ecija, Philippines
- Occupations: Executive producer; technical director; writer; reporter
- Years active: 1998–2012
- Spouse: Allan Torres Camba (m. 2012)

Anita Ramos-Camba (born April 13, 1979) is a Filipina film and television reporter, director, and producer. She has produced several TV shows for Net 25 such as Tribe and the celebrity talk show Moments.

== Personal life ==
Anita Alcantara Ramos was born on April 13, 1979, in Casile, Nueva Ecija, Philippines to Ceferino Nilo Ramos and Celedonia Garcia Alcantara. She is second to the youngest amongst her 9 siblings. She attended Casile Elementary School in Llanera, Nueva Ecija and later continued her schooling at San Ricardo National High School in Talavera, Nueva Ecija. She earned her degree in Mass Communication at the New Era University in the Philippines in 1998. In 2012, Ramos married Allan Camba.

== Career ==
In 2006, Camba was part of the core group that created the cultural program Tribe. For more than 2 years, she has produced documentaries featuring the Filipino people, their lifestyle and values. She was also involved in promoting and marketing Moments, inking deals with trusted brands as program's partners like SM Supermalls, Abbot, Baby Company, Smart Parenting Magazine, Hunter Douglas, Ainon and others.

She is a regular Philippine delegate to various workshops and seminars conducted by the Asia-Pacific Broadcasting Union. In December 2010, she was amongst the 13 broadcasters from seven countries in Southeast Asia to be organized by the ABU for UNESCO in Port Dickson, Malaysia, to raise awareness among journalists and the general public on the importance of local and indigenous knowledge in disaster risk reduction, in particular traditional early warning systems.

== Moments ==
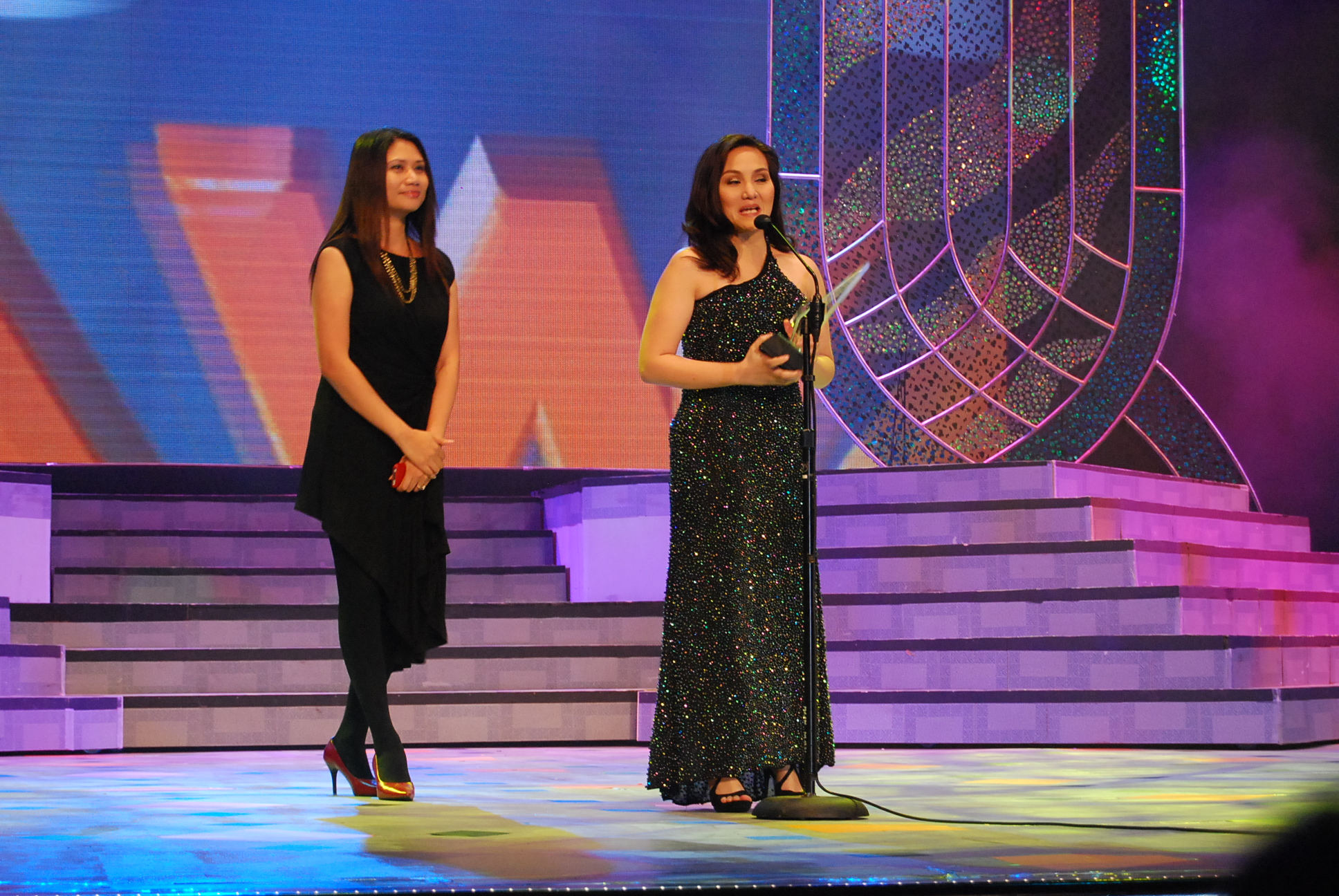
With Gladys Reyes-Sommereux at the Star Awards while Moments receive the Best Celebrity Talk Show during the 25th Philippine Movie and Press Club Star Awards for TV (2011)

The highlight of her career in TV started in 2007, when she produced the multi-awarded family show Moments (Talk Show) from Net 25, hosted by Miss Gladys Reyes-Sommereux, a well-known name in the Philippine Entertainment Industry.

As the executive producer from 2007–2012, Moments earned significant awards and recognitions from the Southeast Asian Foundation for Children and Television, the Philippine Movie and Press Club, Department of Education (Philippines), and the Movie and Television Review and Classification Board.

Among the notable personalities who guested on Moments were Lea Salonga, Imelda Marcos, Nora Aunor, Vilma Santos, Sharon Cuneta, Kris Aquino, Judy Ann Santos-Agoncillo, Lorna Tolentino, Maricel Soriano, Dawn Zulueta, Ai-Ai de las Alas, Helen Gamboa-Sotto, Lily Monteverde, Vic Sotto, Martin Nievera and Robin Padilla.

== Filmography ==
=== Television ===
- 2007–2012 Moments (Net 25), executive producer
- 2006–2008 Tribe (Net 25), executive producer
- 2005–2007 INC Church News (INCTV DZCE-TV), reporter
- 2004–2007 Newsbeat (Net 25), field reporter/editor
- 2003–2005 INC Chronicles (INCTV DZCE-TV), segment producer
- 2002–2003 Christian Music Video (INCTV DZCE-TV), director
