= DZEC =

DZEC may refer to the following stations owned by Eagle Broadcasting Corporation in Metro Manila:

- DZEC-AM, an AM radio station broadcasting as Radyo Agila
- DZEC-TV, a television station broadcasting as Net 25
