= DYFX =

DYFX may refer to the following stations owned by Eagle Broadcasting Corporation in Metro Cebu:

- DYFX-AM, an AM radio station, broadcasting as Radyo Agila
- DYFX-DTV, a television station, broadcasting as Net 25
