= DXED =

DXED may refer to Eagle Broadcasting Corporation's two stations in Metro Davao:

- DXED-AM, an AM radio station broadcasting in Tagum, branded as Radyo Agila
- DXED-DTV, a television station broadcasting in Davao City, branded as Net 25
