= Global Cable =

Philippine cable company

- Company type: Cable TV operator
- Industry: Telecommunications
- Founded: February 15, 1993; Merger entity: Global Destiny Cable TV; February 1, 2003
- Defunct: November 11, 2012
- Headquarters: Pasig, Metro Manila, Philippines
- Products: Cable TV
- Owner: First Global Conglomerates
- Website: Home Page

Global Cable was a cable company in the Philippines.

== History ==
On February 1, 1993, Global Cable Inc. was given a provisional authority to provide cable television services. The National Telecommunications Commission granted Global Cable Inc a certificate authority to construct, install, maintain and operate a Cable Antenna Television (CATV) System in San Pedro, Laguna in May 1993. Consequently, Global Cable Inc was officially launched on February 15, 1993. was also allowed operate and maintain a CATV system in the municipality of San Juan and in the cities of Mandaluyong, Makati, Pasay, Quezon City, Manila, Marikina, Parañaque Pasig and Muntinlupa.

=== Merger with Global Cable ===
On November 17, 2000, however, Global Cable, Inc. (GCI) and Destiny Cable, Inc. (DCI) announced that both companies had entered an agreement on merging the television operations of the two companies, of which operates the cable providers; Global Cable and Destiny Cable.

In November 2000 Destiny Cable formed a partnership with Global Cable to further strengthen and systematize its cable television ventures. However, it was only on February 1, 2003, that the corporate name was changed to Global Destiny Cable.

Global Destiny Cable is perceived to be the closest competitor of SkyCable the Philippines' largest cable TV company in Metro Manila. Both have their own associates all over the country and both offer high-speed cable Internet service to its respective subscribers.

=== Sale to SkyCable ===
On November 11, 2012, Sky Cable Corporation eventually acquired the assets of Global Destiny Cable through its parent, Destiny Cable, Inc. at the cost of P3.5 billion in order to improve services to customers of Destiny Cable, UniCable and MyDestiny broadband Internet.

== See also ==
- G Sat
