= Ang Iglesia ni Cristo =

- Genre: Religious
- Directed by: Evangeline Miranda; Wilner Arguelles
- Starring: Bro. Artemio Francisco, Jr. Bro. Jomar Dueñas; Bro. Leonardo Pidlaoan, Jr. Bro. Jose Gil Manalansan; Bro. Arnel A. Tumanan; Bro. Alfred Alexis Lorido; Bro. Levi M. Castro; Bro. Israel Solano; Bro. Rommell Topacio; Bro. Dareen De Guzman; Bro. Dindo Evangelista; Bro. Anjelo Estacio
- Opening theme: "Mga Alipin Sa Malayong Silangan" by INC Tabernacle Choir
- Country of origin: Philippines
- Original language: Tagalog
- No. of episodes: n/a

Production
- Executive producers: Bro. Dindo Evangelista; Bro. Darren De Guzman
- Producer: Angelica Villaroman
- Production locations: INC TV Studios, Quezon City, Metro Manila, Philippines
- Camera setup: multicamera setup
- Running time: 30 minutes
- Production company: Christian Era Broadcasting Service International

Original release
- Network: MBS/PTV (1983–1986); RPN (1983–1990); City2/BBC (1983–1986); ABS-CBN (1986-2003); IBC (1990-2003); Net 25 (2000–present); GEM TV/INC TV (2005–2012; 2012–present)
- Release: February 13, 1983 – present

Related
- The Message; Ang Tamang Daan

Ang Iglesia ni Cristo (transl. The Church of Christ) is a Philippine television religious program by MBS/PTV, RPN/New Vision 9, City2/BBC, ABS-CBN, IBC, Net 25, GEM TV/INC TV. It aired on City2/BBC and MBS/PTV from February 13, 1983 to 1986, RPN from February 13, 1983 to October 8, 1989 and New Vision 9 from October 15, 1989 to 1990. The show moved to the reopened ABS-CBN from 1986 to 2003, IBC from 1990 to 2003, Net 25 from 2000 to present, GEM TV from July 2005 to October 24, 2012 and INC TV since October 31, 2012. The program produced by the international Christian religious organization Iglesia ni Cristo (through the Christian Era Broadcasting Service International). One of its first panelists of the program was Bro. Eduardo V. Manalo which he's now a current executive minister of the church.

In 1992, the Movie and Television Review and Classification Board (MTRCB) gave an X rating to the church's television program of the same name, Ang Iglesia ni Cristo, for "criticizing different religions, based on their own interpretation of the Bible." The MTRCB also recommended for the program to "delve on explaining their own faith and beliefs and avoid attacks on other faith." Relying on the principle of freedom of religion, the INC appealed the case to the Court of Appeals in 1995, which affirmed the MTRCB's actions, and to the Supreme Court in 1996, which reversed the appellate court's decision. The principle applied in this particular case was also cited in a 2005 case between the MTRCB and Filipino media company ABS-CBN.
