= Moments (talk show) =

- Also known as: MOMents
- Created by: Net 25
- Directed by: Dandi Cabusora; Julius Melo
- Presented by: Gladys Reyes-Sommereux
- Country of origin: Philippines
- Original language: Tagalog

Production
- Executive producers: Anita Ramos Camba; Caesar R. Vallejos
- Running time: 60 minutes

Original release
- Network: Net 25
- Release: November 10, 2007 – December 21, 2024

Moments (stylized MOMents) was a Philippine television celebrity talk show hosted by Gladys Reyes, produced in cooperation with her company GPRSommereux, Inc., and aired on Net 25. It was a show for mothers and kids that featured various bonding moments, child-rearing styles, and the many facets of motherhood. The show aired from November 10, 2007, to December 21, 2024.

== Awards and nominations ==
- Star Award for Best Celebrity Talk Show (25th PMPC Star Awards for TV) (2011)
- 1st MTRCB TV Awards: "Special Award for Promoting Family Values and Solidarity" (MTRCB) (September 4, 2009)
- Nominee for Best Children Show (MTRCB) (2009)
- Anak TV Seal Award (Anak TV) (2009)

Moments logo from 2007 to 2021.

== See also ==
- List of programs broadcast by Net 25
