= Zumba in the Philippines =

Zumba is a fitness program founded by Colombian dancer Beto Pérez in 2001. Ever since then, the program spread worldwide, with multiple countries catering to the program. Zumba later landed in the Philippines in 2011. Multiple events surfaced after the introduction, with a 2023 event breaking a Guinness World Record for the most participants in a Zumba class.

== History ==
=== Background ===
In the Philippines, many people are diagnosed with diseases and health risks, including the local standard “thin is beautiful”, pushing many to lose weight. Multiple fitness trends surfaced the Philippines, with the previous trend being Tae Bo introduced in the 2000s.

=== Origins and spread ===
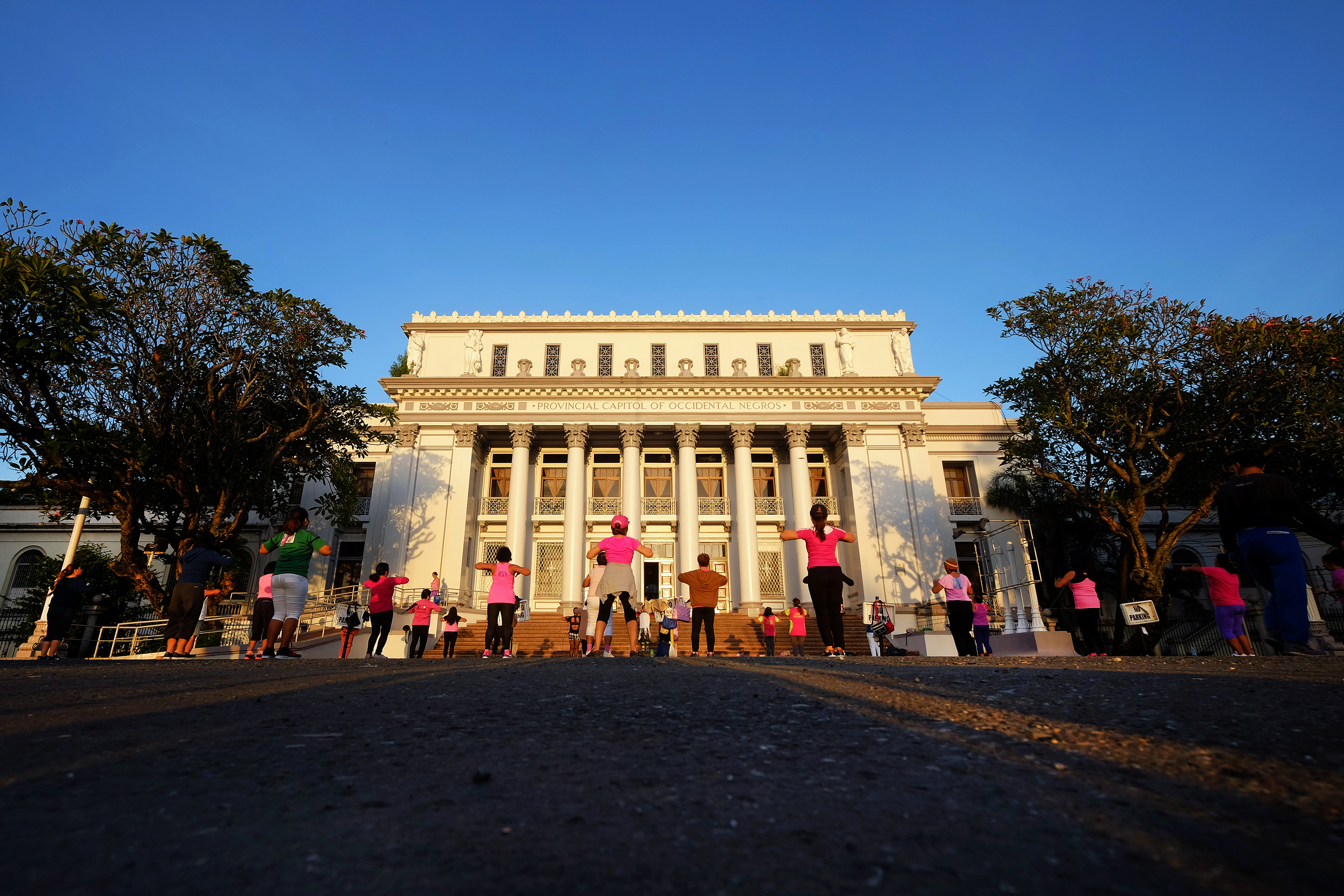
Zumba in the Old Provincial Capitol of Bacolod

In the 2000, Emma Satchell, now known as the nationwide "Zumba Queen", attended Zumba classes in the United States held by Beto's assistant, Kho Herlong. After years of experience, Satchell became a licensed instructor in 2007 and flew to multiple countries to teach her expertise. She later landed in the Philippines in 2011, teaching students and dancing in public parks. Initially, Satchell was laughed at by passerby, pushing her to spread Zumba to local gyms. Even though gym members worshipped Zumba, Satchell spread Zumba to local malls and Barangays.

=== Further spread ===
==== Zayaw Fiesta and other major events ====
In July 2017, Filipino Zumba instructor Ron Antonio released the Original Pilipino music Zumba album Zayaw Filipinas, the first worldwide Zumba album. To promote the album's release, Antonio held a Zumba concert on July 16 in the Philippine International Convention Center. A total of 2,500 people joined, with Pocari Sweat, Organique Acai, Rain International, and Flanax as co-presenters. Two media partners recorded the event, Pinas FM and WhenInManila.com. The event was a success, popularizing Antonio as the "Creator of Pinoy Dance Fitness".

In April 2023, Antonio headed another event, this time breaking the Guinness World Record for the most participants in a Zumba class, with a total of 14,000 participants.

=== Present ===
Zumba is currently one of the most popular fitness workouts in the Philippines, along with CrossFit, Yoga, and multiple others.

== Research ==
A research journal was directed at Zumba and the factors associated with Zumba as a whole. Research was placed in 10 different Zumba locations, preferably malls, gyms, and other locations. Questionnaires were given to participants to calculate their gender, age, weight, height, and other factors. A total of 197 people participated in the survey, with 171 women and 22 men participating. The median age was 40-49, while younger and older people were counted. Half of the people had no recent diseases, while 25% of the people suffered from Hypertension.
