= DZCE-TV =

INC TV television station in Metro Manila

DZCE-TV (INC TV) Iglesia ni Cristo Television
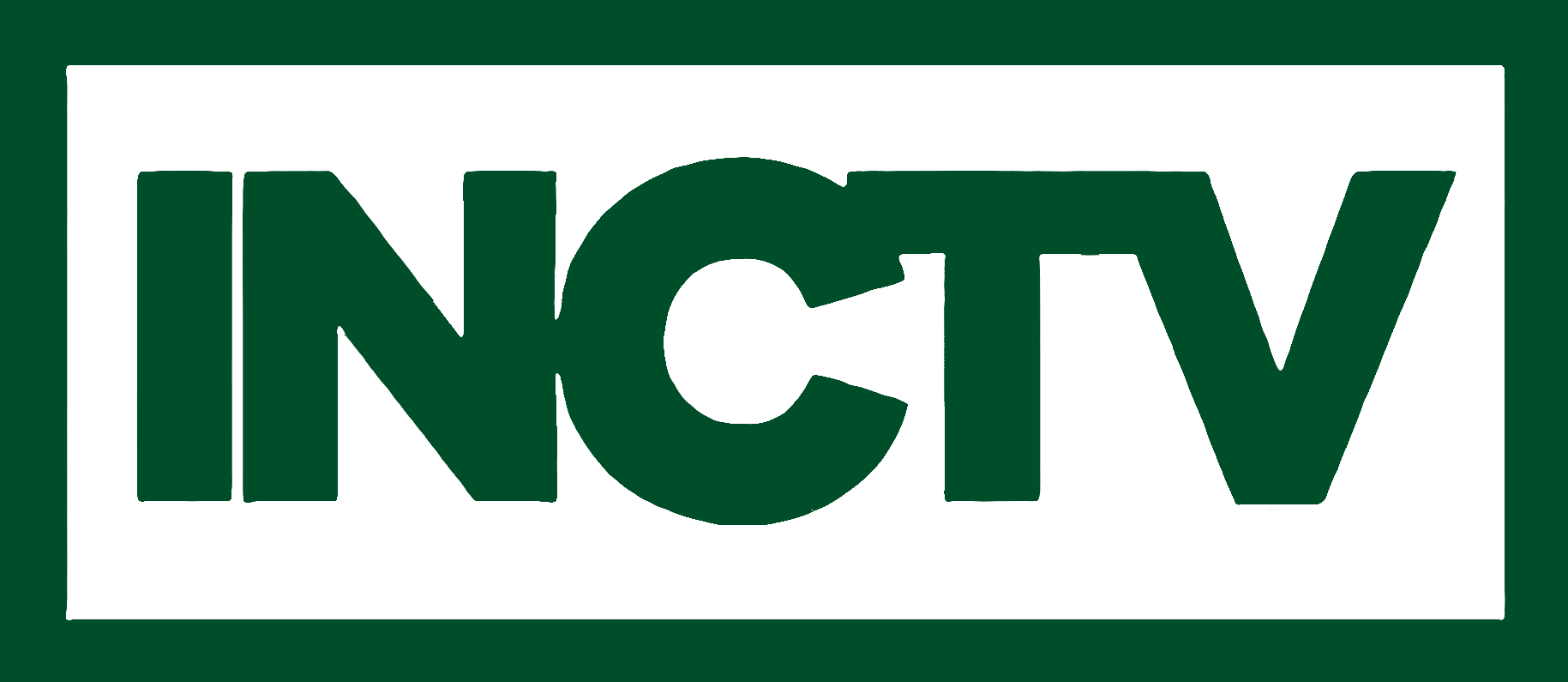
- Metro Manila; Philippines
- City: Quezon City
- Channels: Analog: 48 (UHF) (until January 15, 2027); Digital: 49 (UHF) (ISDB-T); Virtual: 1.1
- Branding: INC TV

Programming
- Subchannels: See list of subchannels
- Affiliations: INC TV

Ownership
- Owner: Christian Era Broadcasting Service International
- Sister stations: INC Radio DZEM 954

History
- First air date: September 20, 2000; 26 years ago
- Former names: Iglesia Ni Cristo Television (2000–2005); GEM TV (2005–2012)
- Former channel number: Analog: 49 (2005–2017)
- Call sign meaning: "Christian Era"

Technical information
- Licensing authority: NTC
- Power: 30 kW (analog); 10 kW (digital)
- ERP: 246 kW (analog); 40 kW (digital)

Links
- Website: inctv.iglesianicristo.net

DZCE-TV (channel 48) is a television station in Metro Manila, Philippines, serving as the flagship of the INCTV network. Owned and operated by Christian Era Broadcasting Service International, a broadcast ministry of the Iglesia ni Cristo (an independent Philippine Christian church), the station maintains studio and hybrid analog and digital transmitting facilities located at Milton Hills Subdivision, Redeemer St., Brgy. New Era, Quezon City.

== History ==
The channel was first launched in September 20, 2000 as a cable-only television station under the longer name Iglesia ni Cristo Television, carrying the Church's long line of evangelical television programs that had begun in mid-1983 on the People's Television Network and Radio Philippines Network and later on other TV networks in the country. The arrival of NET25 in 1999, joined by the launch of the cable station, unified all the shows into two stations, one on cable and one on FTA television. On July 21, 2005, the cable station was relaunched as GEM TV (Global Expansion Media Television) on UHF channel 49, with a mix of religious and secular programs — which includes selected shows from Deutsche Welle as well as Japan Video Topics from NHK and operated with a power of a meager 1 kilowatt. Owing likely to budget considerations, over-the-air operations were limited to just 12 hours a day (between the hours of 6 a.m. and 12 noon, and 6 p.m. and 12 midnight); its existing cable presence allowed the channel to continue broadcast round-the-clock during OTA off-air hours. Later on September 2 of the same year, the original Iglesia ni Cristo Television resumed its broadcast as Sky Cable-exclusive religious channel, with the re-runs of The Message and continued existing episodes and discussions from programs such as Ang Tamang Daan and Ang Pagbubunyag.

From September 1 until 7, 2009, GEM TV, along with EBC-owned NET25, were the only stations airing the live coverage of the wake and funeral of Iglesia ni Cristo's executive minister Eraño Manalo.

On October 9, 2012, channel 49 once again conducted test broadcasts as part of CEBSI's purchase and acquisition of the station's new transmitter equipment, increasing its transmission output to 30 kilowatts. It also began to broadcast over-the-air in the afternoon hours, which was impossible with its decommissioned transmitter. On October 31, 2012, coinciding with the birth anniversary of Iglesia ni Cristo's Executive Minister Eduardo Manalo, who took over upon his father's death three years ago, GEM TV ceased broadcast and merged itself with the existing INC TV channel on cable, making the religious channel available on free television. Since the relaunch of INCTV, religious programs of the Iglesia ni Cristo are the only programs shown on the station, as secular content was removed from its schedule.

On May 8, 2025, INC TV's Digital Terrestrial TV Transmitter power suddenly increased from 500 watts to 10 kW.

In November 2025, the National Telecommunications Commission (NTC) issued Memorandum Circular No. 005-11-2025, establishing a 12-month transition period for analog television stations operating in Mega Manila. The covered area includes the National Capital Region and parts of Bulacan, Rizal, Laguna, Cavite, Pampanga and Bataan. In July 2026, the NTC identified November 22, 2026, as the target date for the Mega Manila analog switch-off. The analog shutdown date was extended by the NTC on November 17, 2026, from the original November 22, 2026, it became January 15, 2027.

== TV Network ==
=== Philippines ===
It is broadcast on both Channel 48 on analog terrestrial TV (until November 22, 2026), and on Channel 49 (or LCN 49.01, 49.02 and 49.35) on digital terrestrial TV in Metro Manila; and as a digital subchannel in Baguio, Alaminos, Lucena, Naga City, Cebu City, and Davao, via Net 25 Digital TV. This station is also carried by major cable operators in the country led by SkyCable (in Mega Manila, INC TV is available on Channels 20 and 136), SkyTV (Channel 48), Cablelink (Channel 96), SatLite (Channel 100), G Sat (Channel 59), Sky Direct (Channel 17), Fili TV (Channel 84), and Cignal (Channel 180).

=== Worldwide ===
INCTV has been reaching television audiences on the United States, Canada, numerous Asian and European countries, Australia and New Zealand, as well as the Middle East and North Africa.

== Events ==
=== Recent Events ===
In time for the INC Centennial Year, new programs were created for the channel. The year 2014, also saw the start of the channel's new tradition - themes for the month, which are also promoted in Net 25 as well since recently.

From 2014, INC TV became the first Filipino religious TV network, and the third television network — following RPN and PTV — to broadcast its floatable digital clock during the course of the network's broadcast. The said move, however, finally abandoned in January 2018, as the network finally transitioned to full High Definition (HD) 16:9 screen ratio.

In 2015, two DZEM radio programs began to be shown on the channel as well.

In 2016, INCTV, the newest member of the Anak TV, bagged the most number of child-friendly television program awards (23 in all) in the Anak TV Seal Awards, the biggest for a young channel as this.

In 2018, the channel's news programming was revamped, and currently several of these are now bilingual to serve the needs of the church's local and international membership.

On April 16, 2020, INCTV was removed from DirecTV with the reason given that the channel had ceased operations.

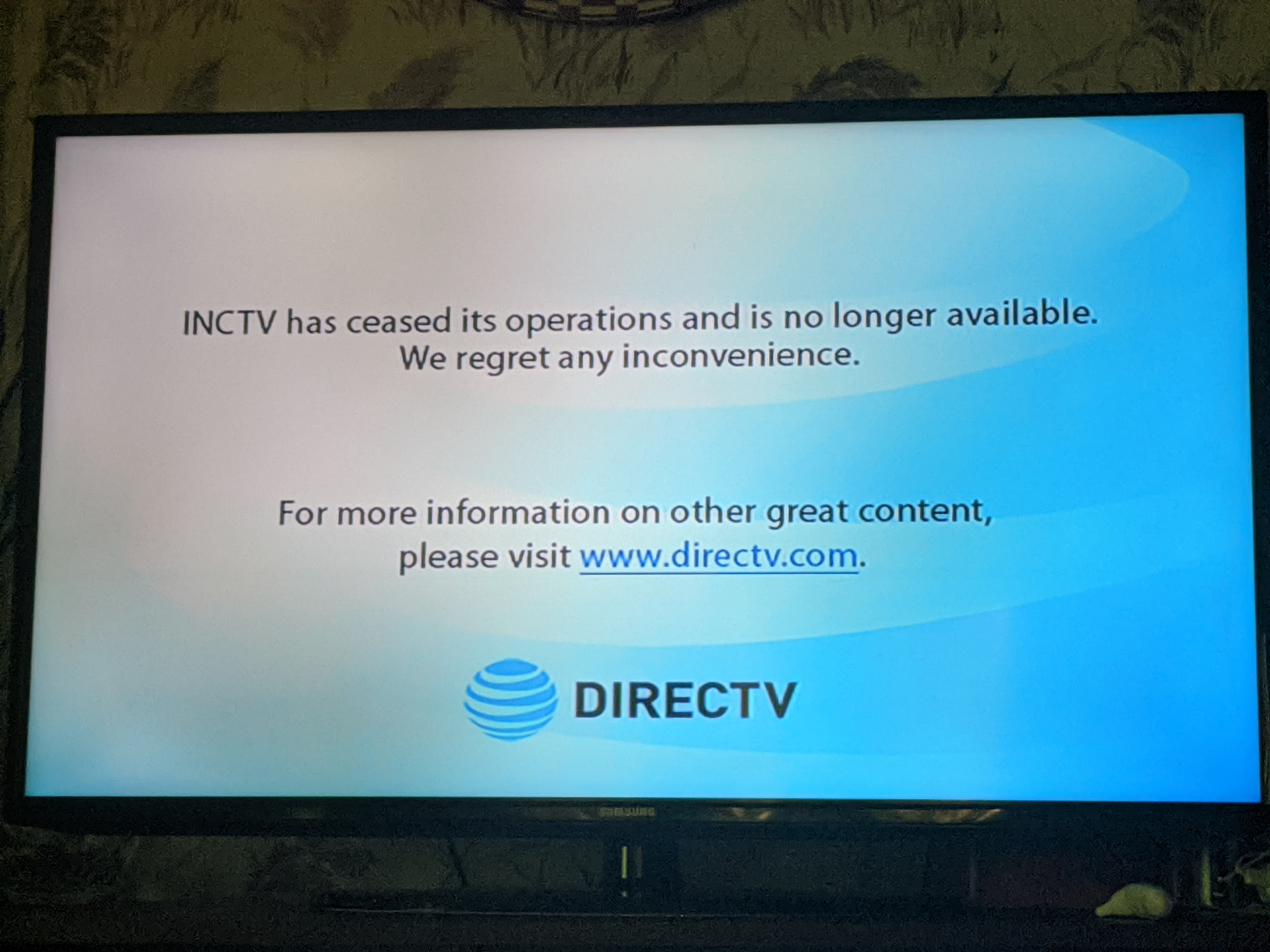
DirecTV's message when INCTV was removed.

On July 27, 2022, in conjunction with the celebration of Iglesia ni Cristo's 108th anniversary, INC TV unveiled its newest station ID, which features its newest logo and its slogan, "Changing Lives Through God's Words."

== Digital television ==
=== Digital channels ===
DZCE broadcasts its digital signal on UHF Channel 49 (683.143 MHz) and is multiplexed into the following subchannels:

Channel	Video	Aspect	Short name	Programming	Note
1.1	1080i	16:9	INCTV HD	INC TV (Main DZCE-TV programming)	Test Broadcast
1.2	480i	16:9	INCTV SD	INC TV (Main DZCE-TV programming)	Test Broadcast
1.3	180p	4:3	INCTV 1SEG	INC TV (Main DZCE-TV programming)	Test Broadcast

=== Analog-to-digital conversion ===
During its GEM TV days, DZCE was the first broadcast television station in the Philippines to broadcast using the ISDB-T system in 2009.

From September 7, 2017, in time for its 8th year since INC's Executive Minister Eduardo Manalo entered office, INCTV was granted a "special authority" from the National Telecommunications Commission to move its analog feed from UHF Channel 49 to Channel 48 with the confliction of Nueva Ecija TV 48 (prior to this, the Channel 48 frequency was being used by People's Television Network, Inc. for their trial transmissions in digital TV until 2015) to allow the former channel to simulcast digitally in full-time, which began two days earlier (September 5). The shift was arranged for the station until its management announce its intention to permanently shut down analog broadcasts and go digital-only.

== Areas of Coverage ==
=== Primary areas ===
- Metro Manila
- Cavite
- Laguna
- Bulacan
- Rizal

=== Secondary areas ===
- Portion of Bataan
- Portion of Pampanga
- Portion of Nueva Ecija
- Portion of Tarlac
- Portion of Zambales
- Portion of Batangas
- Portion of Quezon

== INC TV stations ==
=== INC TV on Free TV ===
Branding	Callsign	Ch. #	Power (kW)	Station Type	Location
INC TV-48 Manila	DZCE-TV	TV-48	30 kW	Originating	Metro Manila

== See also ==
- Christian Era Broadcasting Service International
- Eagle FM 95.5
- Eagle Broadcasting Corporation
- NET25
- DZEC Radyo Agila 1062
- INC Radio DZEM 954 kHz
- Iglesia ni Cristo
