= Tribe (Philippine TV series) =

- Created by: Net 25
- Developed by: Net 25
- Country of origin: Philippines
- Original language: Filipino
- No. of episodes: 685

Production
- Running time: 30 minutes (2006–2013, 2014-2019); 1 hour (2013–2014)

Original release
- Network: Net 25
- Release: March 25, 2006 – August 3, 2019

Tribe was a youth-oriented television program produced by and aired on Net 25 every Sunday at 5:00-5:30 PM Philippine Standard Time that covered different cultures and lifestyles, travel, personalities, technology trends, business, arts and various events held in the Philippines and other parts of the world. It premiered on March 25, 2006, and ended on August 3, 2019.

== Awards and nominations ==
Awards and nominations received by Tribe
Year	Award	Category	Recipient(s)	Result	Ref.
2010	Anak TV Seal	Anak TV Seal Awardee	Tribe	Included	
2011	Anak TV Seal	Anak TV Seal Awardee	Tribe	Included	
2011	PMPC Star Awards for Television	Best Magazine Show	Tribe	Nominated	
2011	PMPC Star Awards for Television	Best Magazine Show Hosts	Christopher Wong, Nicole Facal	Nominated	
2012	Anak TV Seal	Anak TV Seal Awardee	Tribe	Included	
2014	PMPC Star Awards for Television	Best Youth Oriented Program	Tribe	Nominated	
2015	Anak TV Seal	Anak TV Seal Awardee	Tribe	Included	
2016	Anak TV Seal	Anak TV Seal Awardee	Tribe	Included	
2017	Anak TV Seal	Anak TV Seal Awardee	Tribe	Included	

== See also ==
- List of programs previously broadcast by Net 25
