= DZLW =

Radyo Agila Naga (DZLW)
- Canaman; Philippines
- Broadcast area: Camarines Sur and surrounding areas
- Frequency: 711 kHz
- Branding: DZLW Radyo Agila

Programming
- Languages: Bicolano, Filipino
- Format: News, Public Affairs, Talk
- Affiliations: Eagle Broadcasting Corporation

Ownership
- Owner: Peñafrancia Broadcasting Corporation
- Sister stations: 92.7 Eagle FM

History
- First air date: 1987
- Former names: Radyo Bicolandia

Technical information
- Licensing authority: NTC
- Class: B
- Power: 10,000 watts

DZLW (711 AM) Radyo Agila is a radio station owned and operated by Peñafrancia Broadcasting Corporation. Its studios and transmitter are located Zone 1, Brgy. San Agustin, Canaman.

DZLW is an affiliate station of Eagle Broadcasting Corporation since 2015.
