= DWWL =

Eagle FM Canaman (DWWL)
- Canaman; Philippines
- Broadcast area: Camarines Sur and surrounding areas
- Frequency: 92.7 MHz
- RDS: EAGLE FM
- Branding: 92.7 Eagle FM

Programming
- Languages: Bicolano, Filipino
- Format: Contemporary MOR, News, Talk
- Affiliations: Eagle Broadcasting Corporation

Ownership
- Owner: Peñafrancia Broadcasting Corporation
- Sister stations: DZLW Radyo Agila

History
- First air date: 2019
- Former names: Beecool FM (2019-2024)

Technical information
- Licensing authority: NTC
- Power: 5,000 watts

DWWL (92.7 FM), broadcasting as 92.7 Eagle FM, is a radio station owned and operated by Peñafrancia Broadcasting Corporation. Its studios and transmitter are located Zone 1, Brgy. San Agustin, Canaman.

== Legazpi station ==
The call letters formerly belonged to its sister station (98.7 FM) in Legazpi, Albay, which was inaugurated in 2010 as Wow FM. Back then, it was located at the 3rd floor, Rivero Bldg., Capt. F. Aquende Dr., Brgy. Bagumbayan. In 2015, the station went off the air when its station manager, Johnny Dematera, died. Since then, the call letters were transferred to its station in Naga.

In 2019, it returned on air as Kadunong News FM and transferred its operations to Maharlika Highway, Purok 3, Brgy. San Rafael, Guinobatan. It was given a Provisional Authority. Later that year, it was rebranded as Beecool FM.
