= MediaQuest Holdings =

Philippine broadcast company (1998)

MediaQuest Holdings, Inc.
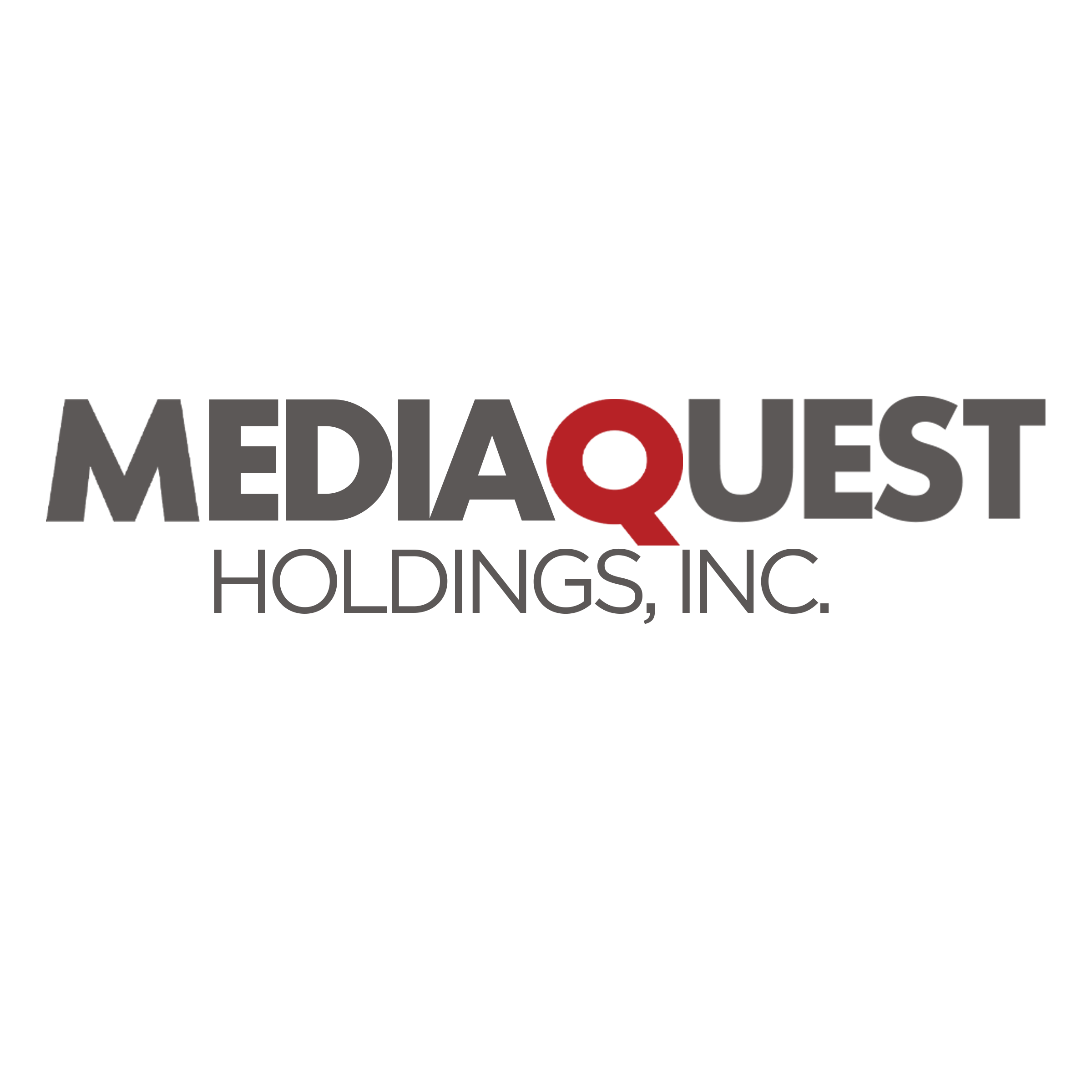
- Type: Subsidiary
- Industry: Mass media
- Founded: 1998
- Headquarters: 5th Floor, LaunchPad Center, Reliance cor. Sheridan Sts., Mandaluyong, Metro Manila, Philippines
- Key people: Manuel V. Pangilinan (Chairman); Victorico P. Vargas (President and CEO); Charles Lejano (Corporate Communications Head)
- Products: Print Publishing; Sports; Pay TV Services; Music; Films; Web portal
- Services: Broadcasting; TV Production; Motion Picture; Cable television; Internet; Streaming service; Record label; Telecommunications; Satellite television; Film distribution
- Revenue: ▼ ₱ 12,2 billion (FY 2022)
- Total assets: ▲ ₱ 26.608 billion (FY 2022)
- Owner: BTF Holdings, Inc. ("PLDT Beneficial Trust Fund")
- Divisions: MQuest Ventures
- Subsidiaries: TV5 Network Inc. Nation Broadcasting Corporation; Cignal TV, Inc. Hastings Holdings, Inc.
- Website: mediaquest.com.ph

MediaQuest Holdings, Inc. is a Philippine media company based in Mandaluyong. It is involved in radio and television broadcasting, as well as direct-to-home satellite services, live events, talent management, sports, content distribution, films, music, digital and print media. It is owned by PLDT, which managed under it's Beneficial Trust Fund agency, a retirement pension plan that has its voting preferred shares. PLDT does not directly own any media property, as the current 1987 Constitution states that media companies should be 100% owned by Filipinos, and the company's major shareholders include foreign entities such as First Pacific and Nippon Telegraph and Telephone.

MediaQuest owns and operates national media firms TV5 Network Inc. (TV5) and Nation Broadcasting Corporation (NBC), as well as pay TV provider and regional radio and TV networks Cignal TV. MediaQuest also owns a majority interest in newspaper companies The Philippine Star and Business World Publishing Corporation (BusinessWorld), and 30% of film production unit Unitel Group.

== History ==
Former logo

MediaQuest was established in 1998 by people connected with PLDT through its Beneficial Trust Fund, a retirement fund agency acting for PLDT employees, not PLDT the company itself. It began with the acquisition of Home Cable, a direct-to-home cable TV subscription service and second largest cable TV company through Unilink Communications. On July 1, 2001, Home Cable merged its CATV operation to Sky Cable Corporation and created Beyond Cable Holdings, Inc. with an enterprise value of P14.5 billion. Beyond Cable Inc. controls 66.5% through Benpres Holdings and 33.5% through MediaQuest Holdings Inc. Home Cable ceased its operations on June 30, 2005 (which was replaced by SkyCable Silver). PLDT sold its stake in SkyCable to ABS-CBN Corporation and Lopez Holdings Corporation in 2008.

In 1998, MediaQuest acquired Nation Broadcasting Corporation from the consortium of the Yabut family and then House Speaker Manny Villar.

In 2001, MediaQuest bought a controlling stake in GMA Network. This was until 2006, when an attempt to acquire GMA failed. MediaQuest attempted to acquire the network again in 2012, but the talks collapsed.

In 2007, MediaQuest acquired GV Broadcasting Systems and its owner, Satventures Inc., a direct-to-home satellite provider and radio network, from the Galang family. In the same year, it launched myTV as a mobile TV service. GV was later renamed as Mediascape, and officially launched its satellite pay TV service Cignal in 2009.

In March 2010, MediaQuest acquired ABC Development Corporation and its blocktimer MPB Primedia Inc. from a joint consortium led by former PLDT Chairman Antonio "Tony Boy" O. Cojuangco Jr. and Malaysia-based media conglomerate Media Prima Berhad. Manuel V. Pangilinan expressed that he had intended to acquire ABC as early as 1999.

In 2013, MediaQuest, through subsidiary Hasting Holdings, took over and later acquired the 70% ownership share in newspaper BusinessWorld after contributing to the company's capital. The group has previously acquired an 18% stake in the national newspaper, the Philippine Daily Inquirer.

In 2014, MediaQuest acquired a majority stake of 51% in The Philippine Star. The Belmonte family, owners of the newspaper, retained a 21% stake, as well as management and editorial control. Pangilinan has since appointed Atty. Ray Espinosa as the company's new chairman of the board.

In May 2022, PLDT named Smart Communications SVP/Head of Consumer Business Jane Basas as the new president and CEO of MediaQuest Holdings, replacing Espinosa, who remained as a board member and retained his positions for Philstar/Hastings and Meralco. Basas previously served as President/CEO of Cignal TV from 2016 to 2020.

In June 2022, ABS-CBN engaged into advanced talks with TV5's parent company, MediaQuest Holdings, to allow its resources combined after Villar Group-backed Advanced Media Broadcasting System acquired ABS-CBN's former frequency, and slated to begin operations in October 2022 as ALLTV-2 and become the flagship station of ALLTV. On August 10, 2022, ABS-CBN and MediaQuest Holdings signed a "convertible note agreement" as announced on the following day for the ABS-CBN's investment into TV5 Network by acquiring 34.99% of the company's common shares, with an option to increase it stake to 49.92% within the next eight years with MediaQuest remained as the TV5's controlling shareholder with 64.79% of TV5's common shares. Meanwhile, MediaQuest Holdings executed a "debt instruments agreement" by acquiring a 38.88% minority stake of ABS-CBN's cable TV arm Sky Cable Corporation through Cignal TV, with an option to acquire an additional 61.12% of Sky Cable shares within the next eight years. After ABS-CBN and TV5 had a partnership deal, the House of Representatives held a briefing, and SAGIP Representative Rodante Marcoleta commented that TV5 violated the broadcasting franchise with the ABS-CBN deal. However, a media briefing that was scheduled a day later was cancelled. On August 24, the two broadcasting companies agreed to pause their closing preparations for the deal following concerns from politicians and some government agencies. However, the agreement was terminated on September 1.

In June 2023, the company announced their partnership with Eat Bulaga! hosts Tito Sotto, Vic Sotto, and Joey De Leon to form their own production company, TVJ Productions Inc., after signing a contract with TV5. This occurred a week after they left TAPE Inc. due to various issues with the new management.

On January 9, 2026, Basas stepped down as president and CEO of MediaQuest, with Ricky Vargas assuming the transitional role of officer-in-charge.

== Assets ==
=== Star Worx ===
Star Worx
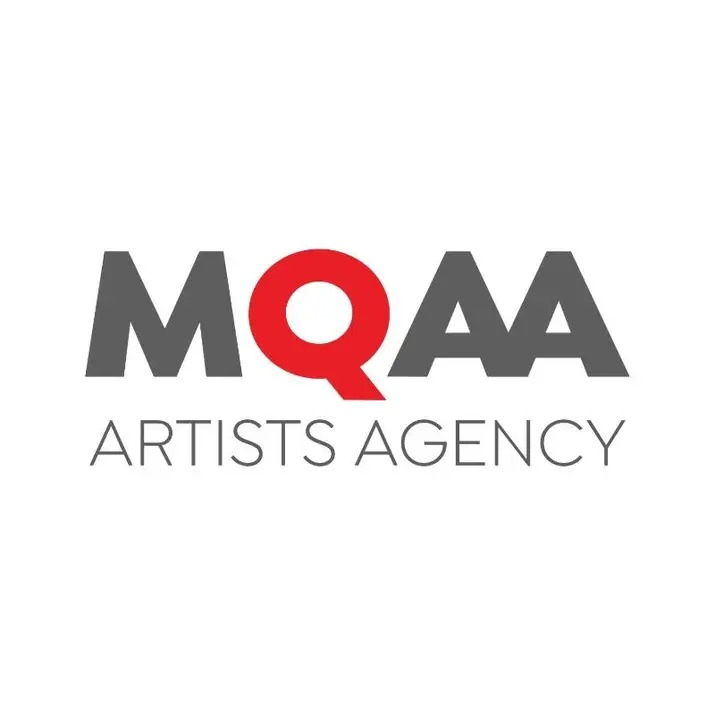
- Formerly: Talent5 (2010–2016); MQ Artists Agency (2024–2026)
- Type: Division
- Industry: Talent agency
- Founded: December 5, 2010; 15 years ago
- Headquarters: TV5 Media Center, Reliance cor. Sheridan Sts., Mandaluyong, Metro Manila, Philippines
- Area served: Nationwide (Metro Manila and suburbs)
- Key people: Victorico P. Vargas (President and CEO); Jeff Remigio (Head of Talent management); Johnny Manahan (Consultant)
- Products: Music and entertainment
- Services: Talent management
- Owner: MediaQuest Holdings
- Parent: TV5 Network Inc.

Star Worx (stylised in all caps, formerly known as Talent5 and MQ Artists Agency, simply known as MQAA, also formally as TV5 Talent and Management Department and Star Worx by MQAA) is a talent agency owned by TV5 Network Inc. based in Mandaluyong, Metro Manila, Philippines that was founded on December 5, 2010.

On May 2, 2024, during TV5, it was announced that the agency had been launched as MQ Artists Agency. Representing MediaQuest was Jane Basas, president and CEO of MQuest Ventures. MQAA is the new in-house talent management arm of MQuest Ventures (MQuest).

On May 5, 2026, during TV5, it was announced that the agency had been renamed "Star Worx": the rebranding.

=== MQuest Ventures ===
MQuest Ventures
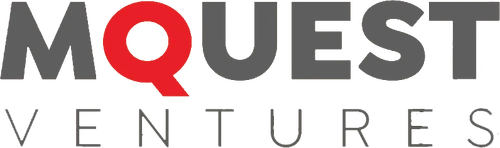
- Type: Division
- Industry: Entertainment
- Predecessors: Studio5; Cignal Entertainment
- Founded: 2023; 3 years ago
- Headquarters: TV5 Media Center, Reliance cor. Sheridan Sts., Mandaluyong, Metro Manila, Philippines
- Area served: Worldwide
- Key people: Victorico P. Vargas (President and CEO); Isabel Aranez-Santillan (Vice President for Head of Integrated Business Development and Partnerships)
- Services: Film and television production, Event management, Collaboration
- Owner: MediaQuest Holdings
- Divisions: MQ Live; MQ Music; MQ Worldwide; Mavenpro; TVJ Productions (51%)

MediaQuest Ventures (or MQuest Ventures) is a Philippine media and entertainment production company. MQuest was launched in 2023 and is described as the "content creation hub" of the MediaQuest Group, which combines film and TV production, talent management, and live events. As a content production company, MQuest Ventures serves as the content provider for TV5 and Cignal TV, as well as third-party affiliate partners.

MQuest Ventures's first production was the anniversary concert of Sarah Geronimo.

=== Television and radio ===
- TV5 Network, Inc. (formerly known as Associated Broadcasting Corporation/Associated Broadcasting Company/ABC Development Corporation) (TV5)
- Nation Broadcasting Corporation (51%)
- TVJ Productions Inc. (51%)
- Mediascape / Cignal TV, Inc. (Cignal) (formerly known as GV Broadcasting System)

=== Motion picture ===
- Cinegear, Inc. (65.7%)
- Unitel Group (30%)
  - UXS Inc. (formerly Unitel Productions, Inc.)
  - Straight Shooters
- Cignal Entertainment
- Epik Studios Inc. (35%)
- Sari-Sari Network, Inc. (50%)

=== Print publishing ===
- Hastings Holdings (Philstar Media Group)
  - BusinessWorld (70%)
  - The Philippine Star (51%)
- Stargate Media Corporation (40%)

=== Other assets ===
- Philippine Online Sports League, Inc. (14%)

=== Previous assets ===
- Beyond Cable Holdings - sold to Benpres Holdings in 2008
  - Home Cable (1999–2005)
- AKTV (80% owned by TV5, 20% minority share in Viva Communications subsidiary, Viva Television) - defunct

== See also ==
- PLDT
