= Ang Tamang Daan =

- Genre: Religious broadcasting
- Directed by: Arsenio "Boots" Bautista; Liza Francisco
- Starring: Maximo Bularan; Michael Sandoval; Leopoldo Guevara; Rene Panoncillo; Ramil Parba; Bobby Fernandez; Joe Ventillacion
- Country of origin: Philippines
- Original languages: Filipino; English

Production
- Production locations: INC TV Studios, Quezon City, Metro Manila, Philippines
- Camera setup: multicamera setup
- Running time: 30 minutes
- Production company: Christian Era Broadcasting Service International

Original release
- Network: SBN (2001-2003); NET25 (2001-present); INC TV
- Release: June 11, 2001 – December 27, 2019

Related
- Ang Iglesia ni Cristo; The Message

Ang Tamang Daan (lit. 'The Right Path') is a program produced by the Philippine-based religious organization, Iglesia ni Cristo, and aired over their television stations, NET25 and Iglesia ni Cristo Television. Originally, the Iglesia ni Cristo debates and rebukes claims made by fellow Philippine religious organization Ang Dating Daan or MCGI and their presiding minister, Eliseo Soriano, about the beliefs of the Iglesia ni Cristo, primarily regarding the deity of Jesus Christ.

Currently, it became a question and answer program about the doctrines of the INC through by e-mail messages by non-members.

The name of the program is probably meant to be a pun of the name of Ang Dating Daan, which is Tagalog for "The Old Path", with the INC claiming their program, Ang Tamang Daan is "The Right Path".

Relations between the two groups have been perennially strained, and both organizations use their respective television programs as well as other media to present "evidence" which they believe shows contradictions in each other's teachings.

== History ==
Ang Tamang Daan began regular programming on June 11, 2001, through SBN-21 (until 2003) and NET25, which was meant only as a counterpoint to Eliseo Soriano's teachings in Ang Dating Daan. However, somewhere in 2006, they decided to air the program just like the other INC programs, mainly to preach the words of the Bible, and not to involve and contradict other beliefs. The format has been adopted to another INC program, Dating Nasa Sumpa Ngayo'y Nasa Tama (Formerly Cursed, But Now is in the Right) or "Ang Mga Nagsialis Sa Samahang Ang Dating Daan" (Those Who Left The Old Path) in 2006, featuring former ADD-turned INC members. Marianito Cayao Jr. and Alfie Angeles, both ADD evangelical workers were the main hosts of the program. Cayao became a full-fledged minister of the INC while Angeles is now a Roman Catholic Augustinian Recollect seminarian. Most of the hosts of the program are the current ministers of the Iglesia ni Cristo such as Rommell Topacio, Leonardo Pidlaoan, Jr., Lemuel Solano, and Romil Estrellado. In October 31, 2012, the program Ang Tamang Daan has returned and continued to INCTV Channel 49 (now on Channel 48)

After a 12 year hiatus, in October 2018, Ang Tamang Daan surprisingly returned to its original format along with the original hosts of the program including Michael Sandoval. In addition to refuting the doctrines of ADD, it has also began answering the arguments made by Catholic Faith Defenders in the television program Know the Truth, hosted by Fr. Abe Argianosa and Atty. Marwil Llasos, which is being aired on the Catholic television station TV Maria.
