= Home Cable =

Philippine cable television service

- Company type: Private (brand)
- Industry: Telecommunications
- Predecessor: Sining Makulay Inc. (1978–1986)
- Founded: 1978 as Sining Makulay Inc. April 27, 1992, as Home Cable
- Defunct: June 30, 2005
- Fate: Merged its operations into Sky Cable
- Successor: SkyCable
- Headquarters: Philippines
- Area served: Metro Manila
- Services: Cable television
- Owner: Sky Cable Corporation
- Parent: Beyond Cable Holdings
- Website: www.home-cable.com

Home Cable was a cable television service in the Philippines. It covered parts of Metro Manila from April 27, 1992, until its closure on June 30, 2005, when it was folded into Sky Cable's operations.

Beyond Cable Holdings, a 50-50 joint venture firm owned by Benpres Holdings (now Lopez Holdings Corporation) and PLDT-backed media firm MediaQuest Holdings, was the parent company of Home Cable.

== History ==
=== Sining Makulay, Inc. ===
The origins of Home Cable can be traced to Sining Makulay, Inc. (SMI), the first commercial cable television company in the Philippines which was granted an exclusive franchise in 1978 (under Presidential Decree No. 1512) and began its operations in 1979. SMI was owned by Roberto Benedicto, a businessman and a political crony of then-President Ferdinand Marcos.

In 1987, President Corazon Aquino issued Executive Order No. 50 which ended the monopoly of SMI and the company ceased operations. In the 1990s, SMI was eventually bought by Unilink Communications Corporation.

=== Home Cable ===
After the acquisition by Unilink Communications Corporation, SMI resumed its cable operations as Home Cable and was officially launched on April 27, 1992, competing with Sky Cable. MediaQuest Holdings, a newly established media investment firm of PLDT, acquired Home Cable in July 1999.

On July 1, 2001, Sky Cable owner Benpres Holdings and MediaQuest entered into a master consolidation agreement to form the holding company Beyond Cable, Inc. with an enterprise value of ₱14.5 billion to manage both operations of Sky Cable and Home Cable.

On June 30, 2005, Home Cable ceased its operations. It was replaced by SkyCable Silver.

== See also ==
- Sky Cable
- Cignal TV
