= Sky Cable Corporation =

Telecommunications company in the Philippines

- Trade name: Sky
- Type: Subsidiary
- Industry: Telecommunications
- Founded: June 6, 1990; 36 years ago
- Headquarters: 6th Floor, ELJ Communications Center, Eugenio Lopez Drive, Diliman, Quezon City, Philippines
- Area served: Metro Manila, Metro Cebu, Metro Davao, and other key cities
- Key people: Mark López (Chairman); Carlo Katigbak (CEO); Claudia Veronica Suarez (COO)
- Products: Sky Cable, Sky TruFiber, Sky TV
- Services: Cable television, broadband internet, IPTV, pay per view
- Revenue: ▼₱5.386 billion (FY 2024)
- Net income: ▼ −₱4.302 billion (FY 2024)
- Owner: ABS-CBN Corporation (59.4%); ST Telemedia (35%); Sky Vision Corporation (4.9%) minorities (1%)
- Parent: ABS-CBN Corporation
- ASN: 32212
- Website: mysky.com.ph

Sky Cable Corporation, doing business as Sky, is a Philippine telecommunications company based in Diliman, Quezon City. It is a subsidiary of the media conglomerate ABS-CBN Corporation, it offers broadband internet, cable television and internet protocol television services under the Sky TruFiber, Sky Cable and Sky TV brands. The company was founded on June 6, 1990 by Benpres Holdings Corporation (now Lopez Holdings Corporation) as Central CATV, Inc.

As of January 2024, Sky has over 650,000 customers across the country, 300,000 cable TV subscribers and 350,000 broadband internet subscribers.

== History ==
On June 6, 1990, Sky Cable Corporation was incorporated as Central CATV, Inc.

On March 25, 1991, Sky Vision Corporation, a holding company incorporated with the primary purpose of buying and owning stocks of Central CATV, Inc. was founded.

On March 30, 1995, Central CATV Inc. was granted a 25-year provisional franchise to establish, construct, maintain and operate community antenna television system in the Philippines through Republic Act 7969.

In 1997, Sky Vision Corporation acquired 47% of Pilipino Cable Corporation for 900 million pesos. In 2001, Sky Cable and Philippine Long Distance Telephone Company's Home Cable entered into a master consolidation agreement to form the holding company Beyond Cable, Inc. In April 2008, ABS-CBN Corporation started consolidating the cable company’s fiscal result into its financial statement.

In May 2011, Singapore-based firm Sampaquita Communications Pte., Ltd. acquired 40 percent of Sky Cable through Philippine Depositary Receipts (PDR) worth 3.612 billion and 250 million pesos of convertible notes to fund the expansion of Sky Cable’s broadband internet and cable television services.

On May 11, 2012, Sky Cable acquired the assets of Destiny Cable (from Destiny Cable Inc.), UniCable (from Uni-Cable TV, Inc.) and MyDestiny broadband internet (from Solid Broadband Corporation) with consolidating value of 3.497 billion pesos.

In 2013, Sky Cable revenues increased by 18% to P6.99 billion from P5.94 billion. The growth in Sky Cable revenues was partly attributable to the acquisition of Destiny Cable, Inc. Postpaid revenues grew by 16% and broadband revenues by 33%. SKY’s cable TV subscriber count improved by 10 percent as of the end of 2012 while SKYbroadband registered a 44 percent growth on its base versus the previous year. In 2013, Sky discontinued its voice over IP service and started offering bundled plans with ABS-CBN Mobile postpaid service which includes a wireless landline connection, SMS, and voice.

On December 23, 2015, the NTC granted Sky an 18-month provisional license to begin offering direct-to-home satellite, with an initial investment of 252 million pesos to roll-out direct broadcast satellite service across 251 cities and municipalities in the Philippines.

In October 2019, Dito Telecommunity signed an agreement with Sky. Under the deal, Dito will utilize Sky's unused fiber-optic cables in Metro Manila.

On June 30, 2020, the National Telecommunications Commission issued a cease and desist order against Sky's direct-broadcast satellite service, Sky Direct.

=== Proposed investment by Cignal Cable Corporation ===
On August 10, 2022, it was announced that Cignal Cable Corporation, a subsidiary of MediaQuest Holdings, will acquire a 38.88% minority stake of Sky Cable Corporation through the execution of a "debt instruments agreement", with an option to acquire an additional 61.12% of Sky Cable shares within the next eight years. After ABS-CBN and TV5 had a partnership deal, the House of Representatives has set a briefing and SAGIP Representative Rodante Marcoleta commented that TV5 violated the broadcasting franchise with ABS-CBN deal. But a day later, the briefing scheduled was cancelled that supposed to happen on that day. On August 24, the two broadcasting companies agreed to pause their closing preparations for the deal following concerns from politicians and some government agencies. On September 1, 2022, both parties announced the termination of the proposed investment.

=== Aborted sale to PLDT ===
On March 16, 2023, PLDT announced that it had entered into a sale and purchase agreement to acquire 100% of Sky Cable Corporation from Sky Vision Corporation, ABS-CBN Corporation and Lopez Inc. for ₱6.75 billion. The acquisition would cover Sky's broadband business and related assets, subject to compliance with certain conditions including the termination or cessation Sky's pay TV and cable businesses. The deal is subject to regulatory approvals. While awaiting the required regulatory approvals, Sky's broadband and cable TV services would continue.

On January 22, 2024, ABS-CBN Corporation disclosed that the Philippine Competition Commission allowed the transaction to proceed. The company also announced that parties would now work to close the sale. On January 26, 2024, Sky announced that it would discontinue its cable TV operations effective February 27. The final broadcast and sign-off of SKYcable was originally scheduled for February 26, 2024 at 11:59pm (PST).

However, on February 22, ABS-CBN Corporation announced that the company and PLDT mutually agreed to not push through with the sale of Sky Cable Corporation despite PCC approval. Alongside with this, the planned shutdown of its cable television service Sky Cable was shelved, thus continuing its cable television service until further notice.

=== Partnership deal with Converge ===
In July 2024, Sky announced its partnership with Converge ICT. Under a certain agreement, Sky will upgrade its broadband network services by utilizing Converge's pure fiber infrastructure. It is set to be transitioned to a full pure fiber from its existing fixed-line broadband service by the end of 2025.

== Products and services ==
=== Sky Cable ===
Sky Cable is the flagship brand of Sky which operates cable television. It has over 300,000 subscribers in Metro Manila, suburbs and key cities in the provinces which include Metro Cebu and Metro Davao.

=== Destiny Cable ===
Destiny Cable (formerly Global Destiny Cable) was the only other cable television brand of Sky. It had around 200,000 subscribers in Metro Manila and Metro Cebu. Its brand along with its assets was acquired by Sky from Destiny Cable, Inc. in 2012. The assets of Uni-Cable was also consolidated in this brand after the acquisition of the asset from Uni-Cable TV, Inc. Destiny is also migrating its subscribers from analog to digital. Destiny Cable was shut down in 2019.

=== Sky TruFiber ===
Sky TruFiber (formerly Sky Broadband and Sky Fiber) is the broadband internet service brand of Sky launched in early 2011. The assets of MyDestiny broadband internet was consolidated in this brand after the acquisition from Solid Broadband Corporation. It has over 350,000 subscribers and is currently the fastest growing product of Sky. In 2012, Sky Broadband became the first internet service provider in the country to offer residential ultra high-speed internet with a download speed of up to 200 Mbit/s in select residential areas in Metro Manila. In 2019, Sky Broadband was rebranded to Sky Fiber.

Following the partnership agreement with Converge to upgrade/utilize Sky's broadband infrastructure, Sky Fiber was renamed as Sky TruFiber in October 2024.

=== Sky Direct ===
Sky Direct was a satellite television service. It offered direct-broadcast satellite television in the country. It boasts a nationwide coverage and exclusive HD and SD channels not available on other providers. Before its shutdown in March 2019, Sky Direct had over 1 million subscribers. It stopped operations on June 30, 2020, due to the expiration of its franchise (and that of ABS-CBN's) on May 4, 2020.

=== Sky Biz ===
Sky Biz is the enterprise service provider brand of Sky. It offers integrated services such as dedicated ultra high-speed broadband internet to small and medium scale businesses in the country. At present, Sky Biz has over 3,000 enterprise subscribers.

=== Sky On Demand ===
Sky On Demand was an over-the-top content service exclusive to Sky subscribers. It offered TV everywhere service to Sky Broadband and Sky Mobi subscribers. It allowed users to watch video on demand content of Sky Cable on any screen and devices.

It was later shut down on September 1, 2020 after the merger of iWant and TFC Online.

=== Sky TV ===
Sky TV is an Internet Protocol television service provide launched in the 4th quarter of 2024 following Sky's partnership with Converge. The service emulates the Vision/FiberTV model which is connected to Sky's fiber line and offers a variety of channels. It is currently available as an add-on option on the Sky TruFiber service and as a bundle pack for Converge's FiberX broadband service, while existing Sky Cable subscribers will have an option to switch to the new IPTV service.

== Subsidiaries ==
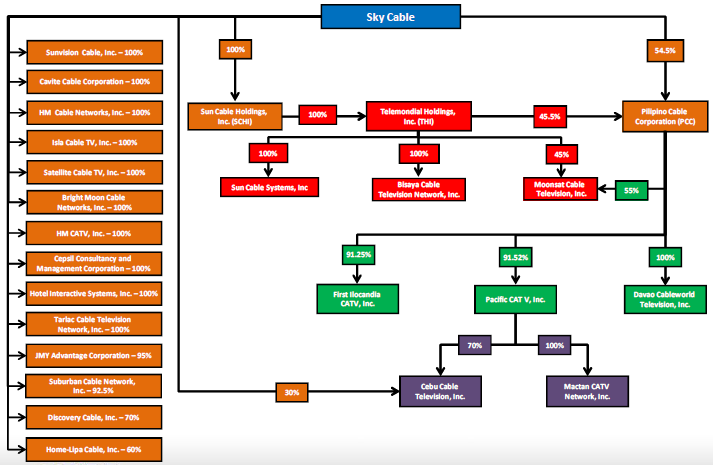

Assets owned by Sky Cable Corporation are listed below. (Note that these are also recognized as an indirect subsidiary of the parent ABS-CBN Corporation. All are wholly owned and operated unless otherwise indicated.)

- Bisaya Cable Television Network, Inc., through Telemondial Holdings, Inc.
- Bright Moon Cable Networks, Inc.
- Cavite Cable Corporation
- Cebu Cable Television, Inc., 30% direct and 70% through Pacific CATV, Inc.
- Cepsil Consultancy and Management Corporation
- Davao Cableworld Network, Inc., through Pilipino Cable Corporation
- Discovery Cable, Inc. (70%)
- First Ilocandia CATV, Inc., 91.25% through Pilipino Cable Corporation
- HM Cable Networks, Inc.
- HM CATV, Inc.
- Home-Lipa Cable, Inc. (60%)
- Hotel Interactive Systems, Inc.
- Isla Cable TV, Inc.
- JMY Advantage Corporation (95%)
- Mactan CATV Network, Inc., through Pacific CATV, Inc.
- Medianow Strategies, Inc. (79.7%)
- Moonsat Cable Television, Inc., 55% direct and 45% through Telemondial Holdings, Inc.
- Pacific CATV, Inc. (91.52%) through Pilipino Cable Corporation
- Pilipino Cable Corporation, 54.5% direct and 45.5% through Telemondial Holdings, Inc.
- Satellite Cable TV, Inc.
- Suburban Cable Network, Inc. (92.5%)
- Sunvision Cable, Inc.
- Sun Cable Holdings, Inc.
- Sun Cable Systems, Inc., through Sun Cable Holdings, Inc.
- Tarlac Television Network, Inc.
- Telemondial Holdings, Inc.
