= DYFX-AM =

Radio station in Cebu, Philippines

Radyo Agila Cebu (DYFX)
- Talisay; Philippines
- Broadcast area: Central Visayas and surrounding areas
- Frequency: 1305 kHz
- Branding: DYFX Radyo Agila 1305

Programming
- Languages: Cebuano, Filipino
- Format: News, Public Affairs, Talk, Religious (Iglesia ni Cristo)
- Network: Radyo Agila

Ownership
- Owner: Eagle Broadcasting Corporation
- Sister stations: DYFX-DTV (Net 25)

History
- First air date: 1972
- Former frequencies: 1310 kHz (1972–1978)
- Call sign meaning: Felix Manalo

Technical information
- Licensing authority: NTC
- Class: B (regional)
- Power: 10,000 watts

Links
- Website: www.radyoagila.com

DYFX (1305 AM) Radyo Agila is a radio station owned and operated by the Eagle Broadcasting Corporation. The station's studio and transmitter facilities are located along Cebu South Coastal Rd., Barrio San Roque, Talisay, Cebu.

== History ==
The station began operations in 1972 as a music-formatted station However, after a few months, it was closed at the time when Martial Law was declared, along with its main station in Metro Manila, DZEC. DYFX resumed its broadcast in December 1977 with a news and talk format. Back then, it was located at Pajeres Bldg. along Osmena Blvd., Cebu City. The following year, it moved to 1305 kHz.

DYFX went off-air for the second time in circa 2003 due to technical difficulties. It was relaunched on July 27, 2017, on its new home along Cebu South Coastal Road in Talisay, Cebu, in time for the Iglesia ni Cristo's 103rd anniversary and the 50th Anniversary of EBC this year.

== See also ==
- DZEC-AM
- Eagle Broadcasting Corporation
- DYFX-DTV
