= DZEC-AM =

Radio station in Metro Manila, Philippines

Radyo Agila (DZEC)
- Quezon City; Philippines
- Broadcast area: Mega Manila and surrounding areas
- Frequency: 1062 kHz
- Branding: DZEC Radyo Agila 1062

Programming
- Language: Filipino
- Format: News, Public Affairs, Talk, Religious (Iglesia ni Cristo)
- Network: Radyo Agila

Ownership
- Owner: Eagle Broadcasting Corporation
- Sister stations: Eagle FM 95.5; DZEC-TV (NET25)

History
- First air date: April 26, 1968
- Former frequencies: 1050 kHz (1968–1978)
- Call sign meaning: Eagle Broadcasting Corporation

Technical information
- Licensing authority: NTC
- Power: 40,000 watts

Links
- Website: radyoagila.com

DZEC (1062 AM) Radyo Agila is a radio station owned and operated by the Eagle Broadcasting Corporation in the Philippines. It serves as the flagship station of Radyo Agila. The station's studio is located at EBC Bldg., 25 Central Ave., Diliman, Quezon City, and its transmitter is located at Brgy. Paliwas, Obando, Bulacan. The station operates daily from 4:00 AM to 12:00 MN.

== History ==
DZEC was established on April 26, 1968, in Manila under Eagle Broadcasting Corporation. The station was then broadcasting on the frequency of 1050 kHz AM featuring news, public affairs, public service, entertainment, educational, music, and religious programs.

On November 23, 1978, DZEC reassigned to the present frequency of 1062 kHz in response to the adoption of the 9 kHz spacing on AM radio stations implemented by the Geneva Frequency Plan of 1975.

Since then, DZEC began expanding into other parts of Luzon, with DZEL in Lucena City (1973) and DWIN in Dagupan, Northern Luzon (1976).

During August 1987, however, DZEC was one of the AM stations in the Metropolis ordered by the National Telecommunications Commission to cease broadcasts for a few months, after getting notoriety for airing controversial right-wing propaganda and commentary programs that were critical of the Corazon Aquino administration. The station returned on air on January 1, 1988, as DZEC Radyo ng Pamilya.

In 1988, it further expanded and acquired local radio stations in Visayas and Mindanao, with DYFX in Cebu and DXED in Davao, covering the 4 said key cities in the Philippines.

On April 30, 2001, DZEC was the only station airing live coverage of the Pro-Estrada Rally (also known as EDSA III). That rally ended in a failed siege of the Malacañang Palace on May 1, 2001. When Net 25 became known for blow-by-blow accounts of Philippine Events, as "DZEC Radyo Agila 1062" (the station began using the Radyo Agila brand since the 1990s) as several of its programs such as "Agila Reports", "Liwanagin Natin", and "Con Todos Recados" began to be aired on the channel, one of the first to pioneer the "TeleRadyo" concept.

on September 4, 2006, EBC dropped the "Radyo Agila" brand and re-introduced its old slogan, "Ang Radyo ng Pamilya". In 2008, DZEC adopted the slogan "Ang Himpilan ng Maligayang Tahanan".

DZEC holds the distinction for being the first KBP Golden Dove Awards People's Choice for AM Station winning by a landslide margin over its nearest competitor. DZEC was the overwhelming choice of radio listeners reigning as the most listened to AM Station for two consecutive years (2009 / 2010).

It was in 2011 when DZEC halted transmission after the wake of Typhoon "Pedring" (Nesat). Despite this, The station's programs continued to air on its relay stations. After a year and a half of hibernation, DZEC went back on air returned as a test broadcast using the station's feed that only airs until 10 pm. On February 12, 2013, Along with Net 25 and Pinas FM 95.5 (now Eagle FM 95.5), its studios moved from Maligaya Building 2 in EDSA to newly built EBC Building along Central Ave. in Diliman. Followed by the reinstatement of the legendary "Radyo Agila" brand, it formally resumed full operations on April 26, 2013, during the 45th anniversary of Eagle Broadcasting Corporation.

Livestreaming features of Net 25 (and its radio station DZEC) returned last January 2, 2014, after a 5-year break.

In January 2023, DZEC became the number 1 AM radio station in Metro Manila on weekday afternoon as well as on weekends, based on the latest Nielsen survey.

== Notable personalities ==
=== Current ===
- Rodante Marcoleta
- Alex Santos
- Ali Sotto
- Rowena Guanzon

=== Former ===
- Jun Banaag
- Victor Wood
- Rey Langit
