= DZEL =

Radyo Agila Lucena (DZEL)
- Lucena; Philippines
- Broadcast area: Southern Luzon and surrounding areas
- Frequency: 1260 kHz
- Branding: DZEL Radyo Agila

Programming
- Language: Filipino
- Format: News, Public Affairs, Talk, Religious (Iglesia ni Cristo)
- Network: Radyo Agila

Ownership
- Owner: Eagle Broadcasting Corporation
- Sister stations: DZEL-DTV (Net 25)

History
- First air date: November 1973
- Former frequencies: 1053 kHz (1973–2006)
- Call sign meaning: EBC Lucena

Technical information
- Licensing authority: NTC
- Power: 5,000 watts

Links
- Website: www.eaglebroadcasting.net

DZEL (1260 AM) Radyo Agila is a radio station owned and operated by the Eagle Broadcasting Corporation in the Philippines. The station's studio and transmitter are located at Brgy. Mayao Silangan, Lucena.
