= ST Telemedia =

Singaporean investment company

Singapore Technologies Telemedia Pte. Ltd.
- Trade name: ST Telemedia
- Type: State-owned
- Industry: Communications; Media; Technology
- Founded: 1994
- Headquarters: Singapore
- Subsidiaries: StarHub; U Mobile; STT GDC
- Website: www.sttelemedia.com

Singapore Technologies Telemedia Pte. Ltd., commonly referred to as simply ST Telemedia, doing business as STT, company name 199500279W, is a Singapore-headquartered strategic investor specialising in Communications and Media, Data Centres and Infrastructure Technology businesses globally. It is represented in 15 countries, three continents across Asia Pacific, the US and Europe. It is a 100% wholly owned subsidiary of Temasek Holdings. In 2016, the company refreshed its corporate identity, adopting a new sunburst logo and streamlined business name to "ST Telemedia".

Some of STT's current and past investment portfolio companies include StarHub, U Mobile, Indosat, Lao Telecom, SkyCable, TeleChoice, STT GDC, GDS Holdings, Equinix, amongst other investments.

== Business activities ==
STT's investment portfolio is centred on three business segments across the digital value chain – Communication & Media, Data Centres, and Infrastructure Technology.

=== 2010 ===
- In March 2010, STT acquired a 33% stake in U Mobile, Malaysia's fourth mobile service provider. It also took a 10% stake in VNPT Global, a subsidiary of VNPT Group, Vietnam's foremost full service telecommunications service operator.

=== 2011 ===
- In May 2011, STT invested in Sky Cable, the Philippines' largest cable company and leading broadband service provider.

=== 2014 ===
- In August 2014, STT re-entered the data centre market with its investment in GDS Services (GDS), a leading provider of advanced and high-availability data centre services in China.

=== 2015 ===
- In March 2015, STT announced plans to build its flagship data centre, known as STT Defu, in Singapore.
- In June 2015, STT, through STT GDC, invested in VIRTUS Data Centres in the UK.
- In July 2015, STT announced a joint venture partnership where its portfolio companies STT GDC and StarHub agreed to build and develop MediaHub, a highly specialised telecommunications, media and data centre facility.
- In August 2015, STT made its first investment in emerging technology verticals, leading a US$40 million financing round in Datameer, a big data analytics and visualization company based in San Francisco, California. Datameer is a big data analytics platform that helps companies create and extract value from enterprise data lakes.

=== 2016 ===
- In May 2016, STT announced its strategic partnership with Tata Communications to expand data centre business in India and Singapore. The partnership involved a 74% majority stake acquisition of Tata Communications’ data centre business in India and Singapore by STT’s wholly owned subsidiary, ST Telemedia Global Data Centres (STT GDC). Tata Communications remains as a significant shareholder, holding the remaining 26% stake in the business. The acquisition of the data centres in India was completed in October 2016, while the acquisition of the data centres in Singapore completed in February 2017.
- In June 2016, STT announced its lead investment in Moogsoft's Series C financing, giving the real-time IT Operation Analytics provider a boost to expand its global operations in Europe, Asia and Americas.
- In August 2016, STT unveiled a refreshed corporate identity to reflect its new strategic direction.

=== 2017 ===
- In April 2017, STT announced its investment in Dallas-based Armor, The First Totally Secure Cloud Company™, and became a joint lead shareholder with The Stephens Group.
- In November 2017, STT led in a new round of funding for Instart Logic, which created a cloud-based digital experience platform that enables brands to increase their online performance.

=== 2018 ===
- In January 2018, STT led in a new round of funding for Bespin Global, a cloud management company which helps enterprise customers in South Korea and China with cloud adoption.

=== 2019 ===
- In January 2019, STT announced that it completed the acquisition of a majority stake in Cloud Comrade, a Singapore-based cloud computing company with presence also in Malaysia and Indonesia.
- ST Telemedia Cloud, a public cloud solutions provider across APAC was established.
- Quantum Security, a portfolio company of STT announced its official entry into the AI and Cloud IT market.
- In October 2019, STT announced that it was taking a majority stake in Seattle-based cloud service provider 2nd Watch.

=== 2020 ===
- In March 2020, STT announced the completion of its majority investment in CloudCover, a cloud-native service provider with presence in India and Southeast Asia.

=== 2024 ===
- In June 2024, STT GDC raised S$1.75 Billion from KKR and Singtel.
- In December 2024, STT announced that it will be selling off a portion of its stake in U Mobile, holding a minority stake of about 20% upon completion of the transaction.

=== 2025 ===
- 38 STT staff were retrenched between October 2025 and December 2025. STT's organisation downsizing represented 63% of STT's total headcount of 60 staff before the retrenchment exercises.
- Amongst those retrenched included senior STT staff such as the Chief Organization Officer, Chief Financial Officer and Chief Risk Officer.

=== 2026 ===
- In August, KKR and Singtel fully acquired STT GDC for S$ 6.6 Billion (with an Enterprise Value of S$ 13.8 Billion). Following completion, KKR holds a 75% stake in STT GDC, while Singtel owns the remaining 25% of STT GDC.
- In September, STT's portfolio company StarHub and M1 announces that they are in potential merger talks.
