= Christian Era Broadcasting Service International =

Philippine television network

Christian Era Broadcasting Service International, Inc
- Formerly: Christian Broadcasting Service (1969–1994); Christian Era Broadcasting Service (1994–2014)
- Company type: Religious broadcasting
- Industry: Broadcast television and radio network
- Founded: February 10, 1969; 57 years ago (radio broadcasts); February 13, 1983; 43 years ago; July 21, 2005; 20 years ago (television broadcasts)
- Founder: Eraño Manalo
- Headquarters: 9 Central Ave. New Era, Quezon City, Metro Manila, Philippines
- Area served: Worldwide
- Products: INC TV; INC Radio
- Owner: Iglesia ni Cristo
- Subsidiaries: CEBSI Films
- Website: www.incmedia.org

INC TV
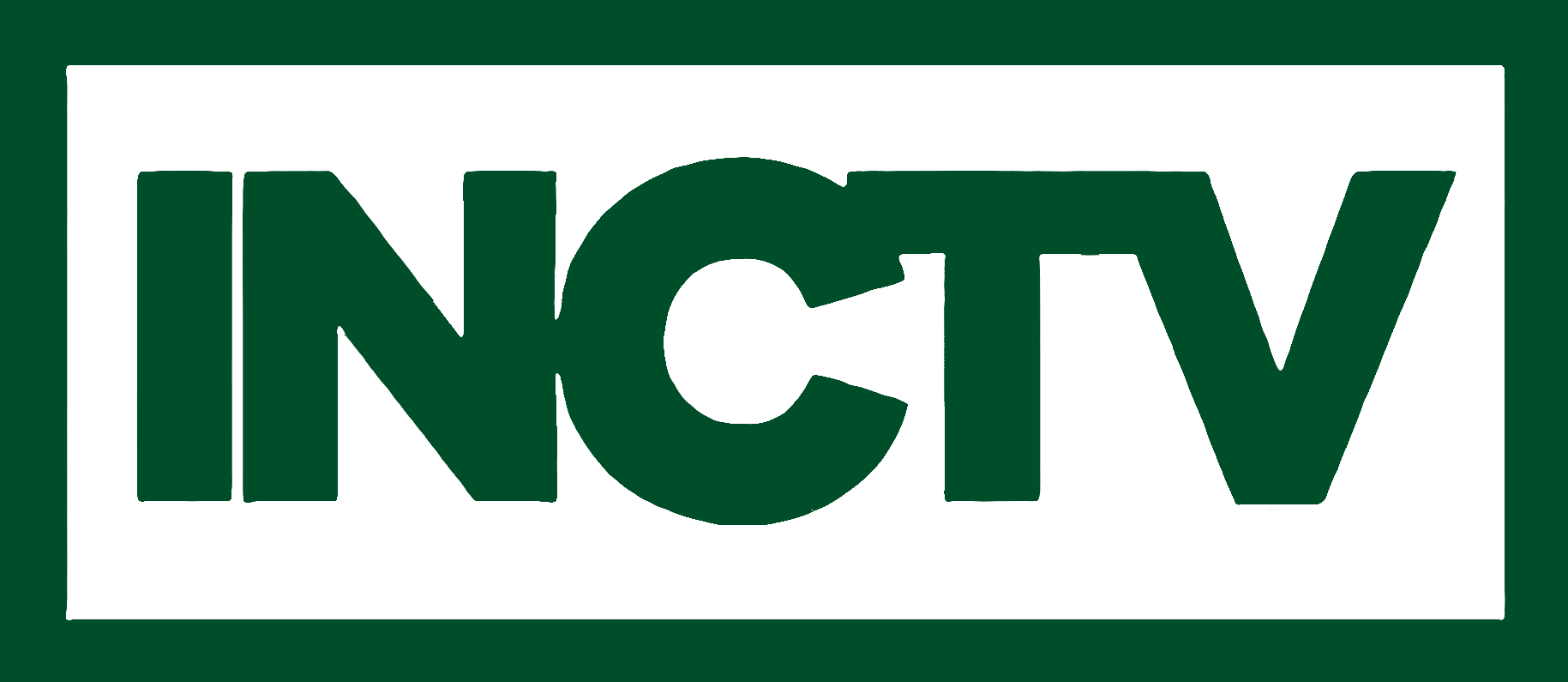
- "Changing Lives Through God's Words"
- Type: Broadcast television network and Online
- Branding: INC TV
- Country: Philippines
- Availability: Asia, Europe, North America, Middle East
- Headquarters: Redeemer Street, Milton Hills Subdivision, New Era, Quezon City
- Broadcast area: Worldwide
- Owner: Christian Era Broadcasting Service International
- Launch date: July 21, 2005; 20 years ago
- Former names: GEM TV (2005–2012)
- Picture format: 1080i HDTV (downscaled to 16:9 480i for the SDTV feed)
- Official website: iglesianicristo.net/inctv
- Language: English; Tagalog; Various Languages

Christian Era Broadcasting Service International, Inc. (CEBSI; formerly known as Christian Broadcasting Service from 1969 to 1994, and Christian Era Broadcasting Service, Inc. from 1994 to 2014) is a Philippine television and radio network, serving as the religious broadcast arm of locally-based church Iglesia ni Cristo. The company is headquartered along Barangay New Era, Diliman, Quezon City.

CEBSI owns television channel INCTV and radio station INC Radio DZEM 954. It is a de facto sister company to commercial broadcaster Eagle Broadcasting Corporation, whose key people are affiliated with the INC.

== History ==
CEBSI was formed by the Iglesia Ni Cristo in 1969 as its media arm and launched the Church's own radio station, DZEM, that same year. It is the Church's official media outfit, with its primary mission being evangelization via radio, television, and the current trends of the Internet and social media.

CEBSI is also the producer of the Iglesia ni Cristo's television programming, which began in 1983, and after many years of producting telemovies and supporting the INC's INCInema program by the INC's regional divisions, spun off a film production house, CEBSI Films, in 2016, resulting in the success of its first-ever television movie which was released in 2017. CEBSI Films also serves as the drama division defacto of sister firm INCTV, debuting its first official weekly TV drama in 2026 for the channel.

== Digital Television ==
With its partnership with the Japanese government through the Ministry of Internal Affairs and Communications (MIC), Digital Broadcasting Experts Group (DiBEG) and the Association of Radio Industries and Businesses (ARIB) in Japan.

It has developed a strong partnership with NET 25, the television station of Eagle Broadcasting Corporation in the digital transmission of the network's HD content.

== Franchise renewal ==
On December 7, 2015, House Bill No. 5226 was approved by the House of Representatives and by the Senate of the Philippines to extend CEBSI's legislative franchise. On May 3, 2016, President Benigno Aquino III signed Republic Act No. 10772 which renewed CEBSI's license for another 25 years. The law grants CEBSI a franchise to construct, install, establish, operate and maintain for religious, noncommercial and nonprofit purposes and in the public interest, radio and/or television broadcasting stations, including digital television system, with the corresponding facilities such as relay stations, throughout the Philippines.

== CEBSI stations ==
=== Analog ===
Branding	Callsign	Channel	Power	Location (Transmitter Site)
INCTV Manila	DZCE	48	30 kW	Milton Hills Subdivision, Redeemer St., Brgy. New Era, Quezon City

=== Digital ===
Branding	Callsign	Channel	Power	Frequency	Location (Transmitter Site)
INCTV Manila	DZCE	49	10 kW	683.143 MHz	Milton Hills Subdivision, Redeemer St., Brgy. New Era, Quezon City

=== Cable ===
Provider	Channel	Coverage
SkyCable	20	Mega Manila
SkyCable	136	Mega Manila
SkyCable	15	Metro Cebu
SkyCable	15	Metro Davao
Destiny Cable	20	Metro Manila
Cablelink	96	Metro Manila
SkyTV	48	Metro Manila
Parasat	22	Regional
Cignal	180	Nationwide
SatLite	100	Nationwide
Sky Direct	17	Nationwide
G Sat	59	Nationwide

=== Radio Stations ===
Branding	Callsign	Frequency	Power	Location
INCRadio DZEM 954	DZEM	954 kHz	40 kW	Metro Manila
