= The Message (Philippine TV program) =

- Genre: Religious broadcasting
- Starring: Ruben Bustos
- Country of origin: Philippines
- Original language: English
- No. of episodes: n/a

Production
- Producers: Iglesia ni Cristo; INC: Central Media Evangelization
- Production location: Anaheim, California
- Camera setup: multicamera setup

Original release
- Network: ABS-CBN (1987–2003); IBC (1992–98); INC TV (2012–present)
- Release: 1987 – present

Related
- Ang Iglesia ni Cristo; Ang Tamang Daan

The Message is the longest-running religious program produced by Philippine-based church, Iglesia ni Cristo and it airs on television station INCTV in the Philippines. The show uses the English language as its primary language, and is produced by the INC Media US bureau. It discusses the religious teachings and beliefs of the Iglesia ni Cristo aimed at audiences in the United States.
