= DXED-AM =

Radyo Agila Southern Mindanao (DXED)
- Tagum; Philippines
- Broadcast area: Northern Davao Region and surrounding areas
- Frequency: 1224 kHz
- Branding: DXED Radyo Agila

Programming
- Languages: Cebuano, Filipino
- Format: News, Public Affairs, Talk, Religious (Iglesia ni Cristo)
- Network: Radyo Agila

Ownership
- Owner: Eagle Broadcasting Corporation
- Sister stations: DXED-DTV (Net 25)

History
- First air date: March 7, 1988
- Call sign meaning: EBC Davao

Technical information
- Licensing authority: NTC
- Power: 10,000 watts

Links
- Website: www.radyoagila.com

DXED (1224 AM) Radyo Agila is a radio station owned and operated by the Eagle Broadcasting Corporation. The station's studio and transmitter are located at Purok Maharlika, Lourdes Sinangcote Village II, Brgy. Magumpo East, Tagum.

The station was formerly located along J.P. Cabaguio Ave., Agdao, Davao City from its inception on March 7, 1988, to September 27, 2020, when it relocated to its present home in Tagum. It was relaunched last October 26, 2020.
