= DWIN-AM =

Radio station in Dagupan, Philippines

Radyo Agila Dagupan (DWIN)
- Dagupan; Philippines
- Broadcast area: Pangasinan and surrounding areas
- Frequency: 1080 kHz
- Branding: DWIN Radyo Agila

Programming
- Languages: Pangasinense, Filipino
- Format: News, Public Affairs, Talk, Religious (Iglesia ni Cristo)
- Network: Radyo Agila

Ownership
- Owner: Eagle Broadcasting Corporation

History
- First air date: 1976
- Call sign meaning: Iglesia ni Cristo

Technical information
- Licensing authority: NTC
- Power: 10,000 watts

DWIN (1080 AM) Radyo Agila is a radio station owned and operated by the Eagle Broadcasting Corporation. Its studios and transmitter are located at Brgy. Lucao, Dagupan.
