= DWDM-FM =

Radio station in Metro Manila, Philippines

Eagle FM (DWDM)
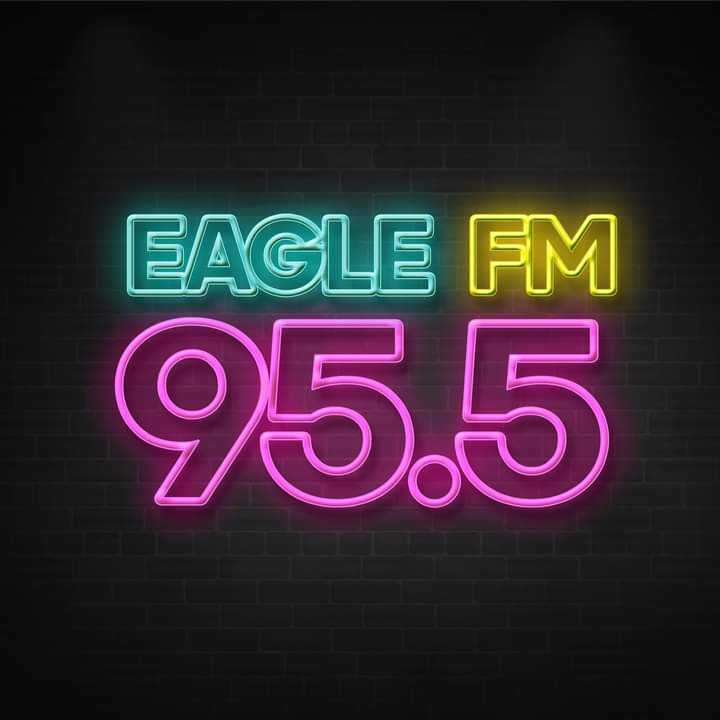
- Quezon City; Philippines
- Broadcast area: Mega Manila and surrounding areas
- Frequency: 95.5 MHz
- RDS: EAGLE FM
- Branding: Eagle FM 95.5

Programming
- Language: English
- Format: Variety, OPM

Ownership
- Owner: Eagle Broadcasting Corporation
- Sister stations: DZEC Radyo Agila; DZEC-DTV (NET25)

History
- First air date: 1973
- Former call signs: DZBU (1973–1981)
- Former frequencies: 107.9 MHz (1973-1978)
- Call sign meaning: Dominador Manalo

Technical information
- Licensing authority: NTC
- Class: B, C, D
- Power: 30,000 watts
- ERP: 96,700 watts

Links
- Webcast: Listen Live
- Website: Eagle FM 95.5

DWDM (95.5 FM), on-air as Eagle FM 95.5, is a radio station in the Philippines owned and operated by the Eagle Broadcasting Corporation. The station's studio and transmitter are located at EBC Bldg., No. 25 Central Ave., Diliman, Quezon City. The station operates daily from 4:00 am to 12:00 midnight.

== History ==
=== 1973–1992: DZBU/DWDM ===
The station first went on air in 1973 as DZBU, airing programs from sister station DZEC. In November 1978, it moved to 95.5 FM as DZEC shifted to 1062 AM. It adopted the call letters DWDM in 1981. During the mid-80s, it was known as Diamond 95.5 DM.

=== 1992–2001: Pinoy Radio ===
In 1992, the station became Pinoy Radio DM 95.5 and adopted an all-OPM format and pioneering the use of mixed Filipino-English by its DJs. It also launched the Pinoy Music Awards to honor OPM artists.

=== 2001–2007: DWDM 95.5 ===
In 2001, the station was relaunched as DWDM 95.5, a fully automated adult contemporary station with the slogan "Feel Your Music". It played music from the 90s to the present on weekdays, rock on weeknights ("Fascinating Refreshing Classics"), and music from the 70s and 80s on weekends.

It ceased transmission in January 2007 for transmitter upgrades, briefly returned in May with limited hours, then went off the air again on June 8, 2007.

=== 2011–2020: Pinas FM ===
Logo of Pinas FM 95.5 from 2011 to 2020

On April 8, 2011, the station returned to the airwaves for a month-long test broadcast, with its studios relocated from Maligaya Bldg. II on EDSA to the New Era University Barn Building. On May 16, 2011, it was officially launched as Pinas FM 955, starting at 4:00 am with the program Newsic, followed by former Pinoy Radio DJs. It initially carried a mass-based format, focusing on the contemporary hits.

On February 12, 2013, the station, along with DZEC Radyo Agila and Net 25, moved to the new EBC Building in Quezon City.

In April 2014, Pinas FM launched its new theme song, "Pinas FM: Tahanan ng OPM" (The Home of OPM), featuring Davey Langit, Aikee, and Chadleen Lacdo-o.

On October 5, 2014, Pinas FM became the country’s first and only FM station to play exclusively Original Pilipino Music, supporting the advocacy of promoting Filipino talent. Leading up to this, the station gradually phased out foreign tracks. It also became the official radio partner of the Organisasyon ng mga Pilipinong Mang-aawit (OPM).

From July 1 to September 29, 2019, the station operated with fully automated music as part of its relaunch preparations.

On September 30, 2019, Pinas FM was relaunched with a new jingle, Pinoy Ka, Dito Ka!, composed by DJ Rapido and performed by Ney Dimaculangan and Acel Bisa. The jingle debuted during the relaunch event, The Switch.

On December 21, 2020, the station’s jocks aired their final broadcast.

=== 2021-present: Eagle FM ===
On December 29, 2020, the station dropped the Pinas FM branding and format, and switched to a classic hits format under the interim name 95.5 FM.

On January 20, 2021, it rebranded as Eagle FM 95.5 with the slogan "Where the Classic Hits Never End". On January 25, its jocks made their debut. Among them were former ABS-CBN DJs Richard Enriquez (now deceased) and Toni Aquino (now with DZBB).

On January 29, 2024, it switched to a variety format, wherein it features a different kind of format each day of the week, and adopted the slogan "For the Love of Music".
