= Destiny Cable =

Cable TV provider in the Philippines

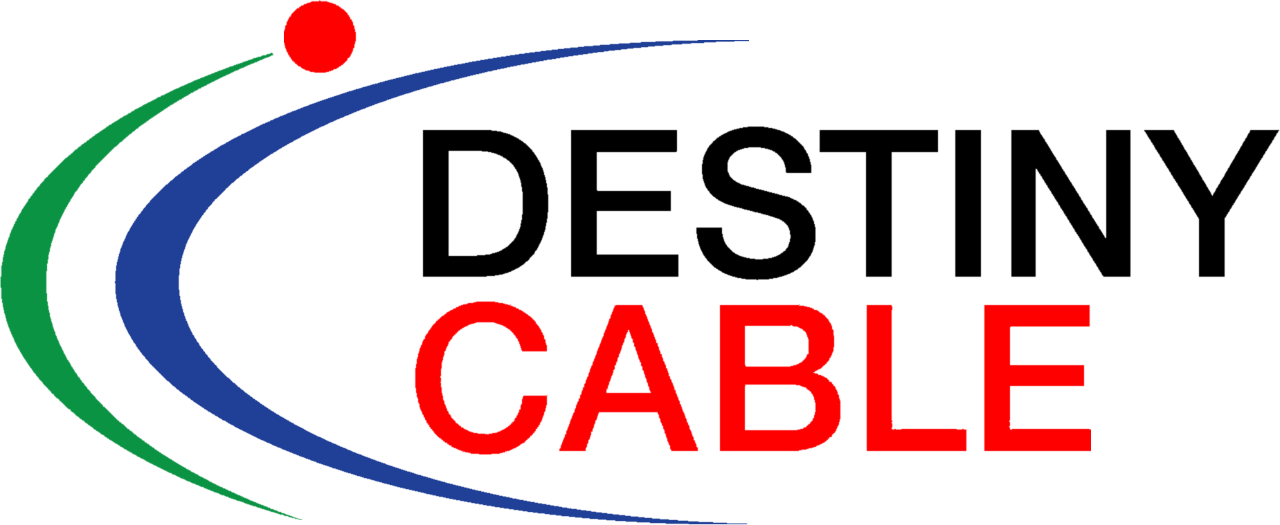
- Type: Brand
- Industry: Cable telecommunications
- Founded: January 16, 1995, as Destiny Cable; Merger entity: Global Destiny Cable (2003–2012)
- Defunct: December 31, 2018
- Successor: Sky Cable
- Headquarters: 6th Floor, ELJ Communications Center, ABS-CBN Broadcasting Center, Mother Ignacia Ave., Diliman, Quezon City
- Services: Analog and digital cable television, Pay per view
- Owner: Sky Cable Corporation
- Website: www.destinycable.com.ph

Destiny Cable (formerly Global Destiny Cable and stylized as DESTINY CABLE) was a direct-to-home cable television subscription service based in Quezon City. Destiny Cable was the 2nd largest cable TV provider in the Philippines. It was owned by Sky Cable Corporation.

== History ==
On January 1, 1995, the Philippines’ commission attached to the Department of Transportation and Communications, the National Telecommunications Commission (NTC) granted a certificate of public convenience and necessity with provisional authority to install, operate and maintain telecommunications, broadcast and cable antenna television services to Destiny Cable Inc was officially launched on January 16, 1995. and allowed to provide cable television services to Metro Manila and nearby municipalities, cities and provinces.

Destiny Cable Inc. embarked on marketing promotion through Solid Group Inc. by offering bundled services.

=== Merger with Global Cable ===
On November 17, 2000, however, Global Cable, Inc. (GCI) and Destiny Cable, Inc. (DCI) announced that both companies had entered an agreement on merging the television operations of the two companies, of which operates the cable providers; Global Cable and Destiny Cable.

In November 2000 Destiny Cable formed a partnership with Global Cable to further strengthen and systematize its cable television ventures. However, it was only on November 2, 2003, that the corporate name was changed to Global Destiny Cable.

Global Destiny Cable is perceived to be the closest competitor of Sky Cable the Philippines' largest cable TV company in Metro Manila. Both have their own associates all over the country and both offer high-speed cable Internet service to its respective subscribers.

=== Sale to Sky Cable ===
On November 11, 2012, Sky Cable Corporation eventually acquired the assets of Global Destiny Cable through its parent, Destiny Cable, Inc. at the cost of P3.5 billion in order to improve services to customers of Destiny Cable, UniCable, and MyDestiny broadband Internet.

Global Destiny Cable has been reverted to Destiny Cable after separation from Global Cable. On November 12, 2012, Destiny Cable headquarters moved from Solid House Building in Makati to Sky Cable's headquarters in Quezon City. The NTC consummated Sky's acquisition on December 18, 2012.

On November 25, 2018, Destiny Cable announced that it would discontinue its cable TV operations effective January 1, 2019. The final broadcast and sign-off of Destiny Cable was completed on December 31, 2018, at 11:59 p.m.

== Areas served ==
Coverage of areas served by Destiny Cable.
- Metro Manila
- Cavite Province: Bacoor
- Rizal Province: Cainta, Antipolo, San Mateo, Rodriguez, Taytay, Angono, Binangonan
- Laguna Province: San Pedro
- Cebu Province: Metro Cebu (UniCable)
