= Eagle Broadcasting Corporation =

Philippine media company

- The logo of EBC since 2011.
- Type: Private
- Industry: Mass media
- Founded: April 26, 1968 (radio broadcasts); April 23, 2000 (television broadcasts)
- Headquarters: EBC Building, #25 Central Avenue, New Era, Quezon City, Philippines
- Area served: Nationwide
- Key people: Caesar R. Vallejos (President and CEO); Glicerio P. Santos IV (Chairman)
- Products: Radyo Agila; Eagle FM; NET25
- Services: Broadcasting; Radio; Television; Digital media
- Divisions: NET25 News and Information; NET25 Entertainment; NET25 Star Center
- Subsidiaries: NET25 Films; E25 Records; Eagle News
- Website: eaglebroadcasting.net

Eagle Broadcasting Corporation (EBC), doing business as NET25, is a Philippine media company based in Diliman, Quezon City, Philippines. Named after the national bird, the Philippine eagle, it is primarily involved in radio & television broadcasting. The primary stakeholders of the company are the key members who are connected with the Iglesia ni Cristo. Its head office and studios are located at no. 25 Central Avenue, New Era, Quezon City.

== History ==
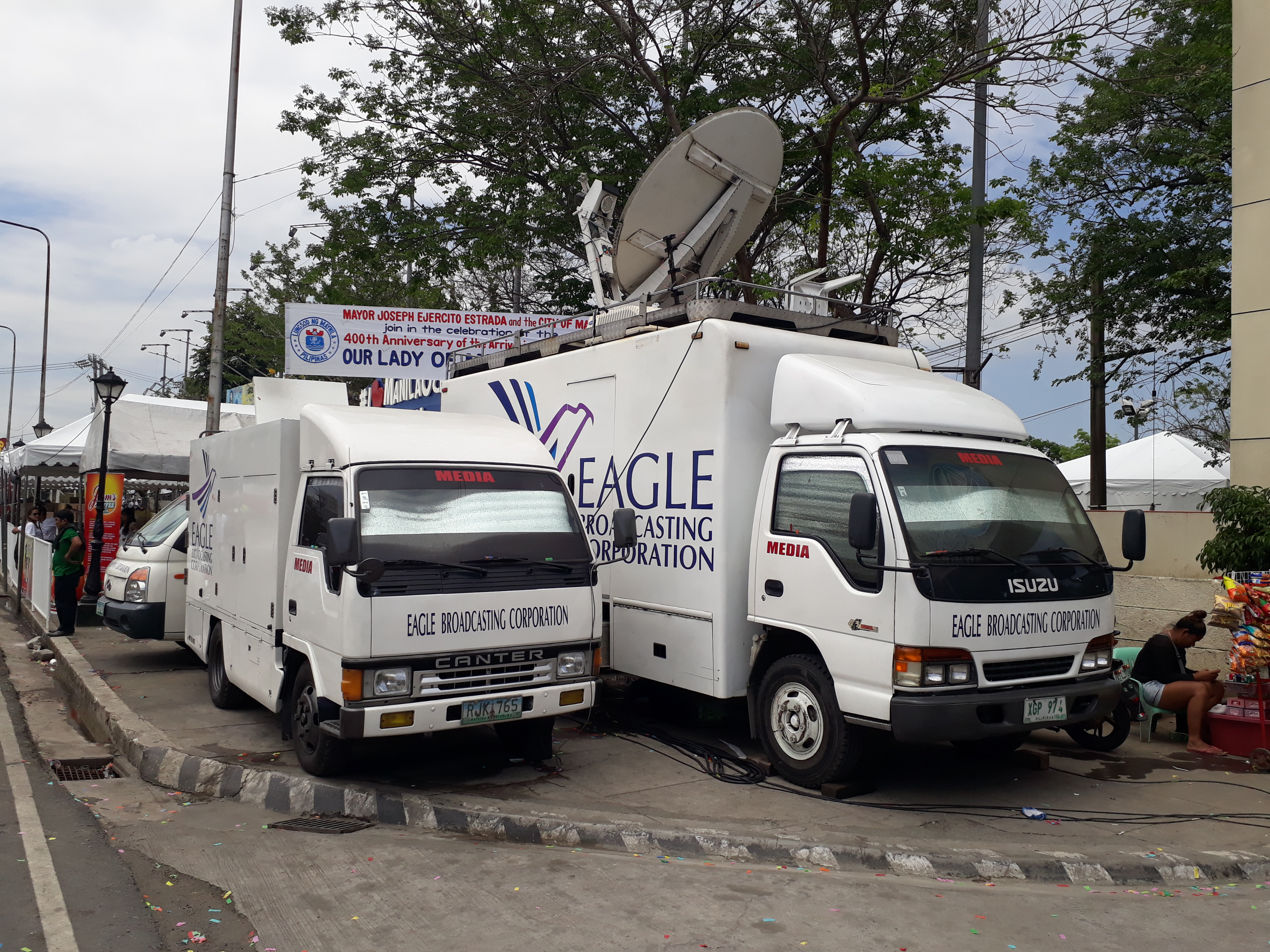
Eagle Broadcasting Corporation (Net 25) outside broadcasting vans at Quirino Grandstand, Manila, 2018

On April 26, 1968, Eagle Broadcasting Corporation was established with its AM station DZEC. Over the next few years, it expanded its coverage by putting up relay stations in Dagupan, Lucena, Cebu & Davao. In 1973, it ventured into FM with DZBU, which later on changed its call letters to DWDM in 1981. It was during the height of EDSA III in 2001 when DZEC adapted the "Radyo Agila" branding.

On April 23, 2000, Eagle Broadcasting Corporation launched a multimedia exhibit dubbed "Destination: PLANET 25", for a station previously owned by ACWS-United Broadcasting Network under the name UltraVision 25 and it was later acquired by EBC and it was renamed as NET25. Capable of 120 kilowatts of transmitter power (for a total of 7,896 kilowatts ERP), Net 25 boasts of the Philippines' first trilon TV tower that rises to 907 feet above sea level. A JAMPRO 48-panel antenna and two 60 kW Acrodyne transmitters complete the tower package. NET 25 also has studios and editing suites for in-house and post-productions. Now Net 25 airs nationwide on 7 digital TV stations and all over the Philippines as well as cable affiliates.

It was recently relaunched last August 7, 2011. As part of the relaunch, it also launched the Eagle Bayan Careavan. Livestreaming features of Net 25 (and its radio station DZEC) returned last January 2, 2014 after a 5-year hiatus.

On February 12, 2013, EBC inaugurated its own broadcast center along Central Avenue, Quezon City, Metro Manila. the event was attended by Iglesia ni Cristo Executive Minister Eduardo Manalo together with EBC's top officials.

On October 31, 2013, it launched its news website and online portal which features news and features from all over the world, including reports from its correspondents in the Philippines and in other countries.

In October 2016, as part of the EBC's worldwide expansion, the network was registered as a duty authorized and accredited media outfit in the District of Columbia, United States of America.

EBC's Washington Bureau in fact, took the lead, in broadcasting the US elections on November 8, 2016.

On October 31, 2017, EBC launched its first ever film, Guerrero, directed by Carlo Ortega Cuevas who had previously won awards for the film, Walang Take Two. Cuevas also directed EBC's first sit-com, Hapi ang Buhay, and its movie sequel which was premiered on September 21, 2018.

== Legislative franchise renewal ==
On May 3, 2016, Philippine President Benigno S. Aquino III signed Republic Act No. 10773 which renewed EBC's legislative franchise for another 25 years. The law granted EBC a franchise to construct, install, operate, and maintain, for commercial purposes, radio broadcasting stations and television stations, including digital television system, with the corresponding facilities such as relay stations, throughout the Philippines.

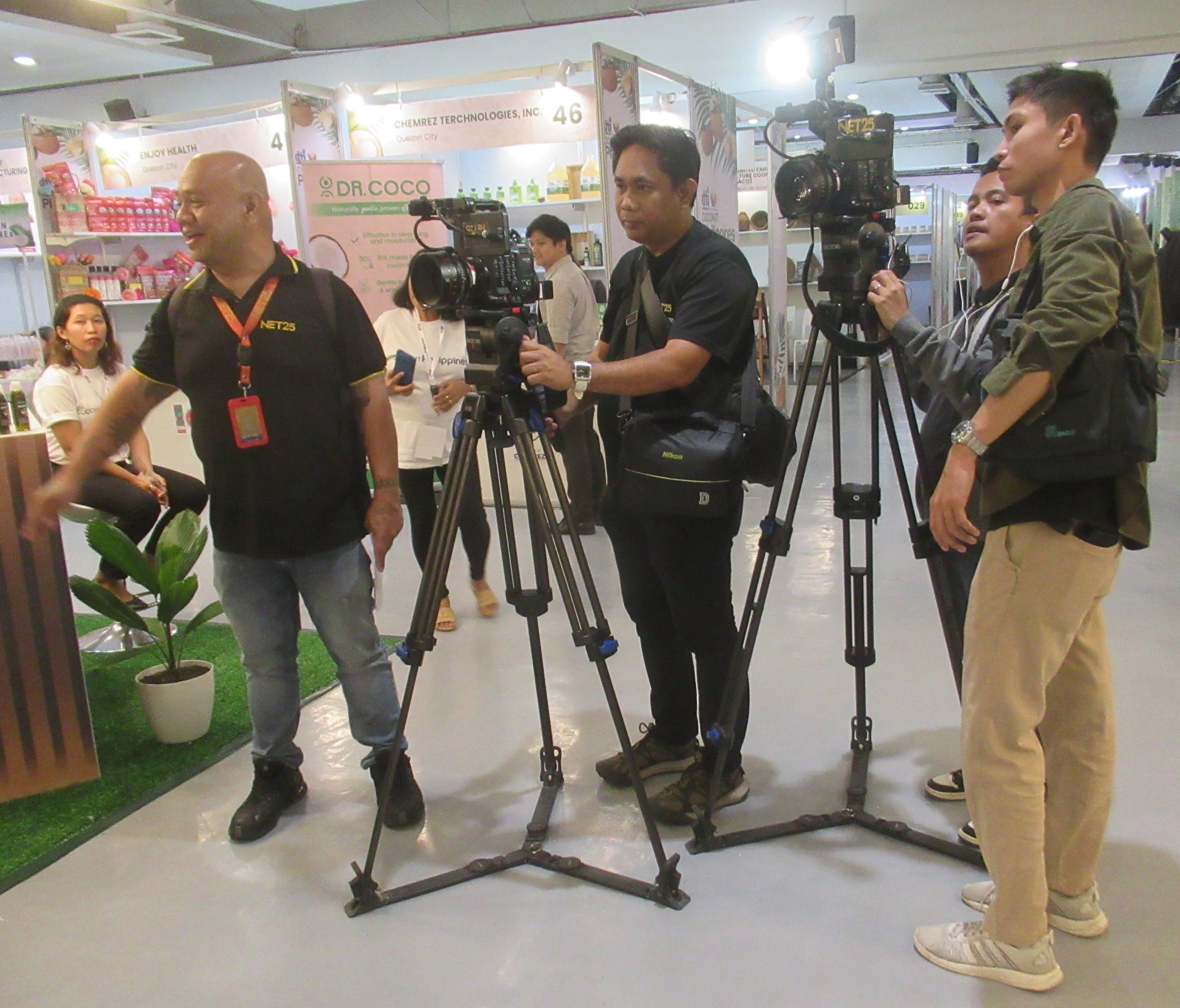
NET25, SM Megamall

== Television stations ==
=== NET25 ===
==== Analog (until January 15, 2027) ====
Branding	Callsign	Channel	Power	Type	Location (Transmitter Site)
NET25 Manila	DZEC	25	50 kW	Originating	Redeemer Street, Milton Hills Subdivision, New Era, Quezon City

==== Digital ====
NET25's upcoming expansion of digital terrestrial television will be announced as soon as possible for other key regional areas nationwide:

- Dagupan, Pangasinan
- Laoag, Ilocos Norte
- Puerto Princesa, Palawan
- San Lorenzo, Guimaras
- Cagayan de Oro, Misamis Oriental
- General Santos, South Cotabato

Branding	Callsign	Channel	Frequency	Power	Type	Location (Transmitter Site)
NET25 Manila	DZEC	28	557.143 MHz	10 kW	Originating	Redeemer Street, Milton Hills Subdivision, New Era, Quezon City
NET25 Baguio	PA	25	539.143 MHz	1 kW	Relay	Mt. Sto. Tomas, Tuba, Benguet
NET25 Palayan	PA	46	665.143 MHz	1 kW	Relay	Brgy. Maligaya, Palayan, Nueva Ecija
NET25 Laguna	PA	25	539.143 MHz	1 kW	Relay	Maharlika Highway, Brgy. San Benito, Alaminos, Laguna
NET25 Lucena	PA	51	695.143 MHz	1 kW	Relay	Brgy. Mayao Silangan, Lucena
NET25 Naga	PA	47	671.143 MHz	1 kW	Relay	Brgy. San Agustin, Canaman, Camarines Sur
NET25 Cebu	DYFX	49	683.143 MHz	1 kW	Relay	Motorpool St, Brgy. Gun-ob, Lapu-Lapu City
NET25 Davao	DXED	49	683.143 MHz	1 kW	Relay	Cabaguio Avenue, Brgy. Agdao, Davao City

=== Cable ===
Provider	Channel	Coverage
SkyCable	18	Metro Manila, Rizal, Cavite, Laguna and Bulacan
SkyCable	9	Metro Cebu, Metro Davao
Destiny Cable	18	Metro Manila
Cablelink	17	Metro Manila
DASCA Cable	112	Dasmariñas
Cignal	14	Nationwide
SatLite	25	Nationwide
G Sat	7	Nationwide
FiliTV	23	Nationwide
Parasat	90	Regional
Other Cable/Satellite Providers	N/A	Check Local Listings

== Radio stations ==
=== FM Stations ===
Branding	Callsign	Frequency	Location
Eagle FM	DWDM	95.5 MHz	Metro Manila

=== AM Stations ===
Branding	Callsign	Frequency	Location
Radyo Agila Manila	DZEC	1062 kHz	Metro Manila
Radyo Agila Dagupan	DWIN	1080 kHz	Dagupan
Radyo Agila Lucena	DZEL	1260 kHz	Lucena
Radyo Agila Cebu	DYFX	1305 kHz	Cebu City
Radyo Agila Davao	DXED	1224 kHz	Tagum

=== Affiliate stations ===
Branding	Callsign	Frequency	Location	Owner
Radyo Agila Naga	DZLW	711 kHz	Canaman	Peñafrancia Broadcasting Corporation
Eagle FM Naga	DWWL	92.7 MHz	Canaman	Peñafrancia Broadcasting Corporation
Eagle FM Guinobatan	PA	98.7 MHz	Guinobatan	Peñafrancia Broadcasting Corporation
