= Sky Cable =

Cable television service in the Philippines

- Logo since 2018
- Industry: Telecommunications
- Predecessors: Sun Cable; Home Cable; Destiny Cable
- Founded: January 26, 1992; 34 years ago
- Headquarters: 6th Floor, ELJ Communications Center, Mother Ignacia Avenue, Quezon City, Metro Manila, Philippines
- Area served: Philippines
- Products: Cable television
- Owner: ABS-CBN Corporation
- Parent: Sky Cable Corporation
- Website: www.mysky.com.ph

Areas served by Sky Cable's digital services.
Areas served by Sky Cable's analog services.

Sky Cable (stylized as SKYcable) is a cable television service of Sky Cable Corporation (a wholly owned subsidiary of media conglomerate ABS-CBN Corporation) in the Philippines. It covers areas across the country with both digital and analog cable services, and as of January 2024 had 300,000 cable and 350,000 broadband subscribers.

== History ==
On June 6, 1990, Sky Cable Corporation was incorporated as Central CATV, Inc.

On March 25, 1991, Sky Vision Corporation, a holding company incorporated with the primary purpose of buying and owning stocks of Central CATV, Inc. was founded. At that time, its ventures consisted of cable television (SkyCable and Sun Cable), communication, system, television media, shopping network (Sky Mall) and film distribution (Sky Jemah). It is owned 18.8% by ABS-CBN Corporation and 78% by Lopez Inc.

SkyCable started operating its community antenna television system in the Philippines on January 26, 1992, providing cable Internet, VoIP services and digital cable TV service.

On March 30, 1995, Central CATV Inc. was granted a 28-year provisional franchise to establish, construct, maintain and operated community antenna television system in the Philippines through Republic Act 7969.

In 1997, Sky Vision Corporation acquired 47% of Pilipino Cable Corp., operator of Sun Cable for P900 million.

In 2001, Benpres Holdings Inc. and Philippine Long Distance Telephone Company signed a master consolidation agreement for SkyCable Corporation to consolidate its interest.

In July 2001, Unilink Communications Corp. operator of Home Cable, Philippines second largest cable TV company, merged its CATV operation with SkyCable and created Beyond Cable Inc. with an enterprise value of P14.5 billion. Beyond Cable Inc. controls 66.5% through Benpress Holdings Corp. and 33.5% through MediaQuest Holdings, Inc.

On December 7, 2001, Beyond Cable Holdings Inc. was incorporated.

In May 2011, Singaporean firm Sampaquita Communications Pte. Ltd. acquired 40 percent of SkyCable through Philippine Depositary Receipts worth P3.612 billion and P250 million of convertible notes to fund the expansion of SkyCable's broadband Internet and cable TV services.

On May 11, 2012, SkyCable bought Destiny Cable Inc., Uni-Cable TV Inc. and Solid Broadband Corporation's cable TV and broadband internet assets and subscribers with consolidating value of P3.497 billion.

On June 1, 2026, SkyCable discontinued its premium cable TV channels on its traditional platform as part of transition to a pure fiber network in which its premium cable TV channels will become available in Sky TV and at the same time, introduction of SKYCable Lite with limited channel lineup.

=== Planned sale to PLDT and shutdown aborted ===
On March 16, 2023, PLDT announced that it had entered into a sale and purchase agreement to acquire 100% of Sky Cable Corporation from Sky Vision Corporation, ABS-CBN Corporation and Lopez Inc. for ₱6.75 billion. The acquisition would cover Sky's broadband business and related assets, subject to compliance with certain conditions including the termination or cessation Sky's pay TV and cable businesses. The deal is subject to regulatory approvals. While awaiting the required regulatory approvals, Sky's broadband and cable TV services would continue.

On January 22, 2024, ABS-CBN Corporation disclosed that the Philippine Competition Commission allowed the transaction to proceed. The company also announced that parties would now work to close the sale. On January 26, 2024, Sky announced that it would discontinue its cable TV operations effective February 27. The final broadcast and sign-off of SKYcable was originally scheduled for February 26, 2024 at 11:59pm (PST). At the time, it was reported that the company had 300,000 cable subscribers and 350,000 broadband subscribers.

However, on February 22, ABS-CBN Corporation announced that the company and PLDT mutually agreed to not push through with the sale of Sky Cable Corporation despite PCC approval. Alongside with this, the planned shutdown of its cable television service Sky Cable was shelved.

=== Digital system ===
SkyCable adopted DVB-C digital transmission standards, utilizing encrypted digital set-top boxes (Digibox) with ISO/IEC 7816-compliant smart cards to manage subscriber access and prevent unauthorized use.

=== Smart card ===
SkyCable Digital's Digibox conveys programming with encryption to alleviate signal piracy. It utilizes ISO/IEC 7816 smart cards, which transmit digital signals to the receiver to decrypt the programming for viewing.

=== High-definition channels ===
On September 19, 2008, SkyCable initiated the pay-per-view broadcast of the 2008 Ryder Cup golf tournament in high-definition (HD). In July 2009, Skycable also commenced a locally produced HD program through Balls HD, the collegiate basketball tournament—University Athletic Association of the Philippines and the National Collegiate Athletic Association.

=== Personal video recording ===
On December 8, 2010, SkyCable announced plans to introduce a personal video recording (PVR) service in the Philippines during the first quarter of 2011, citing functionality comparable to TiVo systems available in the United States. The service, marketed as iRecord, launched on March 21, 2011. It utilized a 320GB hard drive, offering up to 145 hours of standard-definition or 86 hours of high-definition recording capacity.

== Carriage and content disputes ==
=== GMA Network signal tampering/distortion ===
In February 2003, GMA Network filed a complaint against SkyCable for allegedly moving its signal from channel 12 without approval of the National Telecommunications Commission. Authorities decided on April 25, 2003, that SkyCable violated the provisions of Memorandum Circular 4-08-88 and ordered to carry the free-to-air television signal on its system except when theoretically impracticable. It also ordered SkyCable to faithfully and strictly conforms with the requirements and to conclude from randomly changing channel assignments without notice and approval from local authorities. As a result, SkyCable filed a motion for reconsideration addressing the rule invalidate the means as it conflicts with a state law on intellectual property but local authorities denied the motion and directed SkyCable to comply with its previous decision. Consequently, the latter filed another appeal through an appellate court but still rejected their request and ordered them to conform to local authorities resolution.

In August 2015, SkyCable Corporation answered GMA Network's complaint over the loss of television signal during the KalyeSerye segment of Eat Bulaga! (formerly produced by TAPE Inc., now produced by TVJ Productions on TV5 and RPTV). In 2015, GMA Network in the Philippines filed a complaint against SkyCable regarding signal interruptions during GMA Network's "Eat Bulaga!" broadcast, in which SkyCable denied.

=== Carriage disputes with Solar Entertainment ===
On January 1, 2008, Solar Entertainment Corporation pulled its 6 cable channels from Sky Cable; namely Basketball TV, Solar Sports, ETC Entertainment Central, 2nd Avenue, Jack TV and Crime/Suspense. The channels were replaced by 6 new channels owned by fellow subsidiary Creative Programs, Inc.; AXN Beyond, Balls, Fox Crime, KidsCo, Maxxx and Velvet. While vice president Juno Chuidian stated in a report to GMA News TV (now GTV, then QTV 11) that the new channels were added because they would offer less "redundant" programming and feature more series that had never been aired in the country before, reports surfaced that the channels were pulled due to a dispute; ABS-CBN believed that Solar's lower fees for advertising on its channels were causing ABS-CBN to lose revenue.

Solar Entertainment however, retaliated by expanding its partnership with the terrestrial broadcasters Radio Philippines Network (whose ironically owning, operating and using several broadcasting facilities, channel frequencies, and transmitter broadcast stations formerly owned, operated and used by ABS-CBN), Southern Broadcasting Network, and Rajah Broadcasting Network; adding programming from its C/S, ETC, and 2nd Avenue cable channel to their primetime lineup, and using RPN as part of its successful bid against ABS-CBN for the next PBA broadcast contract.

=== AksyonTV ===
On March 14, 2011, TV5 filed a complaint to the National Telecommunications Commission against Sky Cable, accusing it of refusing to carry AksyonTV, despite law designating all free-to-air television networks as must-carry channels. The channel was added to Sky Cable's digital lineup on April 30, 2011.

== See also ==
- Sky Direct
- Sky Cable Corporation
- ABS-CBN TV Plus
- ABS-CBN Corporation
