= Net 25 =

Philippine television network

- Logo used since 2023
- Type: Free-to-air television network
- Country: Philippines
- Broadcast area: YouTube live streaming (news); Philippines

Programming
- Languages: Filipino (main); English (secondary)
- Picture format: 1080i HDTV (downscaled to 16:9 480i for the SDTV feed)

Ownership
- Owner: Eagle Broadcasting Corporation
- Key people: Caesar R. Vallejos (President and CEO); Wilma V. Galvante (Creative Consultant)
- Sister channels: Through INC: INC TV

History
- Launched: July 27, 1999; 27 years ago (as Net 39); April 23, 2000; 26 years ago (as Net 25)
- Former names: Net 39 (1999–2000)

Links
- Website: net25.com

Availability

Terrestrial
- Analog: Channel 25 (Metro Manila) (Until January 15, 2027)
- Digital terrestrial television: Channel 28.1 (Metro Manila); Channel 25.1 (Benguet and Laguna); Channel 51.1 (Lucena); Channel 47.1 (Naga); Channel 49.1 (Metro Cebu and Metro Davao)
- Sky Cable Metro Manila: Channel 18
- Converge Vision / SkyTV Metro Manila: Channel 25
- Cignal TV Nationwide: Channel 14
- SatLite Nationwide: Channel 25
- G Sat Nationwide: Channel 44
- Destiny Cable Metro Manila: Channel 18
- Cablelink Metro Manila: Channel 17

Net 25, stylized as NET25, is a Philippine free-to-air television network owned and operated by the Eagle Broadcasting Corporation. The network is named for its flagship station in Metro Manila, DZEC-TV, which is carried on UHF Channel 25 on analog terrestrial TV and UHF Channel 28 on digital terrestrial TV and has carried by major cable and satellite operators in the country. The station's broadcast facilities are located at the EBC Building, #25 Central Ave., New Era, Quezon City.

Net 25 has been reaching television audiences on the United States, Canada, numerous Asian and European countries, Australia and New Zealand, as well as the Middle East and North Africa.

== History ==
NET25 started its operations on July 27, 1999, and was officially launched on April 23, 2000, through a multimedia exhibit dubbed Destination: NET 25.

In late April 2001, NET25 (along with sister station DZEC-AM) was the only station airing live coverage of the Pro-Estrada Rally (also known as EDSA III) - the rally ended in a failed siege of the Malacañang Presidential Palace on May 1, 2001. When Net 25 became known for blow-by-blow accounts of Philippine Events including Philippine National Elections, Philippine presidential inauguration, the Philippine President's State of the Nation Address and the Iglesia ni Cristo's anniversary event (every July 27 of the year). The programming originally consisted of teleradyo programs such as Liwanagin Natin, Con Todos Recados and Openline, canned programs related to technology, arts, lifestyle, and culture, as well as religious programs from the Iglesia ni Cristo including Ang Tamang Daan.

Net 25 eventually began introducing more original programs such as Spoon, MOMents, and Tribe.

On September 2009, NET25 along with CEBSI-owned GEM TV (now INC TV), were the only stations airing the live coverage of the wake and funeral of Iglesia ni Cristo's executive minister Eraño Manalo. Prior to this, during the network's news update, then-NET25 newscaster Eunice Mariño and then-INC spokesperson Bienvenido Santiago announced that Manalo died at the age of 84 due to Cardiac arrest.

In November 2011, NET25 introduced a new station ID introducing the tagline Dito na 'ko (I'm Here), which replaced the old tagline Feed Your Mind, signaling NET25's thrust to appeal to a more mainstream audience.

On January 4, 2014, NET25 introduced a new station ID with a simple blue text superimposed on a Philippine eagle-inspired logo.

During the week of July 21–27, 2014, NET25 was the official broadcaster of the Iglesia ni Cristo centennial celebrations.

In July 2015, due to the onslaught of the INC leadership scandals, NET25 was relaunched with the slogan I Am One With 25 (a secularly-altered version of the code for the INC's Executive Minister Eduardo Manalo, I Am One With EVM), for a new slogan of the network in line with its new programming thrusts through its support of the INC's Executive Minister Eduardo Manalo.

On August 2015, NET25 preempted all regular programming to give way to the coverage of the Iglesia ni Cristo peaceful assembly.

On May 6, 2018, NET25 was the official broadcaster of the INC Worldwide Walk to Fight Poverty charity event.

On October 4, 2020, NET25 relaunched its logo retaining the "NET25" 2014 wordmark, changing its color to gold and added the golden Philippine Eagle on the top (later removed in December 2023). At the same time, NET25 introduced its new programs such as Tagisan ng Galing, Happy Time, Kesayasaya, and EBC Music: #EnjoyMusicBeyondTheCrisis.

On October 31, 2021, NET25 relaunched again its slogan as Let's Net Together sa NET25 with a new station jingle and new station ID, re-imaging itself as a station targeting not only Iglesia ni Cristo members, but also a broader audience.

On February 8, 2022, NET25 covered the campaign events of then-presidential candidate and former senator Bongbong Marcos and then-vice presidential candidate and then-Davao City mayor Sara Duterte held in the Philippine Arena, Ciudad de Victoria, Bocaue, Bulacan during the network's primetime news program, Mata ng Agila.

On December 5, 2022, Eric Quizon was tapped by EBC/NET25 management to become the head of NET25's newest talent management arm, NET25 Star Center.

On April 23, 2025, NET25 celebrated its 25th anniversary of broadcasting.

== Digital television ==
NET25, with the help of GEMNET, had the first digital and full HD coverage of the 2010 Philippine elections via the ISDB-T system through their sister station's frequency, Channel 49. It also offered real-time election results via datacasting. However, the coverage was only available in some areas in the Philippines.

== Programming ==
With its initial partnership with ZDTV (later known as TechTV in 2001), NET25 was a television station devoted to information technology. It previously carried programs like Call for Help, Fresh Gear, Extended Play, NET Café, Next Step, Computer Chronicle and Audio File. It will also feature programs from DW-TV Germany starting April 7, 2025.

NET25 has been the official broadcaster of the Iglesia ni Cristo (INC) religious programs, including Ang Tamang Daan and Ang Mga Nagsialis sa Samahang Ang Dating Daan, which rebukes and debates claims made against the INC organization by the UNTV 37 programs Ang Dating Daan and Itanong Mo Kay Soriano hosted by Bro. Eli Soriano of the rival religious group Ang Dating Daan. Currently, the INC programs are aired under the unofficial INC-TV on Net 25 block.

NET25's programming consists of news and public affairs programs by Eagle News Service and edutainment programs by EBC Edutainment TV. The programming is similar to that of Sonshine Media Network International (SMNI), a broadcast arm of the Kingdom of Jesus Christ (KJC) led by international televangelist pastor Apollo Quiboloy. Net 25 has also featured a number of Korean dramas, including The Snow Queen, Class 7 Civil Servant, Flower I Am, Never Twice, A Place in the Sun, Fatal Promise, Mysterious Personal Shopper, Unwanted Family, House of Bluebird, and Gracious Revenge.

== NET25 News and Information ==
NET25 News and Information (formerly known as NET25 Integrated News and Current Affairs, Eagle News and NET25 Eagle News Service also known as NET25 News) is the network's official news, information and public affairs division of the whole Eagle Broadcasting Corporation. The Eagle News Service was created in November 2011 in order to compete with the news organizations of three major TV networks. The organization produces news and information content for the flagship TV station NET25, flagship AM radio station DZEC Radyo Agila 1062 and the network's official online news portal.

== See also ==
- Eagle Broadcasting Corporation
