= List of Hiram na Anak episodes =

List of episodes of the 2019 Philippine TV series

Hiram na Anak (lit. Borrowed Child) is a 2019 Philippine television drama series starring Yasmien Kurdi, Leanne Bautista and Dion Ignacio. The series premiered on GMA Network's noontime block and worldwide on GMA Pinoy TV from February 25 to May 3, 2019.

The series ended, but its the 10th-week run, and with a total of 48 episodes.

== Series overview ==
Month	Episodes	Monthly averages
Month	Episodes	NUTAM
February 2019	4	5.0%
March 2019	21	5.0%
April 2019	20	5.2%
May 2019	3	5.6%
Total	48	5.2%

== Episodes ==
=== February 2019 ===
Episode		Original air date	Social media hashtag	AGB Nielsen NUTAM People in Television Homes		Ref.
Episode		Original air date	Social media hashtag	Rating	Timeslot rank	Ref.
1	"Pilot"	February 25, 2019	#HiramNaAnak	5.4%	#2	
2	"Miren Meets Hilda"	February 26, 2019	#HNAMirenMeetsHilda	—N/a		
3	"Ang Pagbubuntis" (The Pregnancy)	February 27, 2019	#HNAAngPagbubuntis	—N/a		
4	"Bigong Ina" (Failed Mother)	February 28, 2019	#HNABigongIna	—N/a		

=== March 2019 ===
Episode		Original air date	Social media hashtag	AGB Nielsen NUTAM People in Television Homes		Ref.
Episode		Original air date	Social media hashtag	Rating	Timeslot rank	Ref.
5	"Konsensya" (Conscience)	March 1, 2019	#HNAKonsensya	—N/a		
6	"Ina o Anak?" (Mother or Child?)	March 4, 2019	#HNAInaOAnak	—N/a		
7	"Magkaibigan" (Friends)	March 5, 2019	#HNAMagkaibigan	—N/a		
8	"Ampunan" (Adoption)	March 6, 2019	#HNAAmpunan	—N/a		
9	"Laban, Miren" (Fight, Miren)	March 7, 2019	#HNALabanMiren	—N/a		
10	"Trahedya" (Tragedy)	March 8, 2019	#HNATrahedya	—N/a		
11	"Aksidente" (Accident)	March 11, 2019	#HNAAksidente	—N/a		
12	"Depresyon" (Depression)	March 12, 2019	#HNADepresyon	—N/a		
13	"Episode 13"	March 13, 2019	#HiramNaAnak	—N/a		
14	"Duday"	March 14, 2019	#HNADuday	—N/a		
15	"Hinanakit" (Resentment)	March 15, 2019	#HNAHinanakit	—N/a		
16	"Suspect"	March 18, 2019	#HNASuspect	—N/a		
17	"Foster Child"	March 19, 2019	#HNAFosterChild	—N/a		
18	"Kalinga" (Shelter)	March 20, 2019	#HNAKalinga	—N/a		
19	"Pusong Ina" (Heartful Mother)	March 21, 2019	#HNAPusongIna	—N/a		
20	"Pagtatagpo" (Encounter)	March 22, 2019	#HNAPagtatagpo	—N/a		
21	"Lukso ng Dugo" (Leap of Blood)	March 25, 2019	#HNALuksoNgDugo	5.1%	#2	
22	"Pagkikita" (Meeting)	March 26, 2019	#HNAPagkikita	—N/a		
23	"Motibo" (Motive)	March 27, 2019	#HNAMotibo	—N/a		
24	"Duda" (Doubt)	March 28, 2019	#HNADuda	—N/a		
25	"Rebelasyon" (Revelation)	March 29, 2019	#HNARebelasyon	—N/a		

=== April 2019 ===
Episode		Original air date	Social media hashtag	AGB Nielsen NUTAM People in Television Homes		Ref.
Episode		Original air date	Social media hashtag	Rating	Timeslot rank	Ref.
26	"Sukdulan" (Vengeance)	April 1, 2019	#HNASukdulan	5.0%	#2	
27	"Laban, Adrian" (Fight, Adrian)	April 2, 2019	#HNALabanAdrian	5.1%	#2	
28	"Paglalapit" (Approach)	April 3, 2019	#HNAPaglalapit	5.0%	#2	
29	"The Truth"	April 4, 2019	#HNATheTruth	5.3%	#2	
30	"Anak" (Child)	April 5, 2019	#HNAAnak	4.9%	#2	
31	"Tunay na Ina" (Real Mother)	April 8, 2019	#HNATunayNaIna	5.2%	#2	
32	"Pagluluksa" (Mourn)	April 9, 2019	#HNAPagluluksa	5.2%	#2	
33	"Sakim" (Greedy)	April 10, 2019	#HNASakim	5.5%	#2	
34	"Pag-amin" (Confession)	April 11, 2019	#HNAPagAmin	5.6%	#2	
35	"Tunay na Ama" (Real Father)	April 12, 2019	#HNATunayNaAma	5.5%	#2	
36	"Ang Pagbawi" (The Redemption)	April 15, 2019	#HNAAngPagbawi	5.8%	#2	
37	"Pag-agaw" (Snatch)	April 16, 2019	#HNAPagAgaw	4.9%	#2	
38	"Greed"	April 17, 2019	#HNAGreed	5.2%	#2	
39	"Akin si Duday" (Duday is Mine)	April 22, 2019	#HNAAkinSiDuday	4.9%	#2	
40	"Choices"	April 23, 2019	#HNAChoices	5.1%	#2	
41	"Panganib" (Danger)	April 24, 2019	#HNAPanganib	4.9%	#2	
42	"Determinasyon" (Determination)	April 25, 2019	#HNADeterminasyon	5.3%	#2	
43	"Turning Point"	April 26, 2019	#HNATurningPoint	5.0%	#2	
44	"Panganib" (Danger)	April 29, 2019	#HNAPanganib	5.0%	#2	
45	"Walang Pagsuko" (Without Giving Up)	April 30, 2019	#HNAWalangPagsuko	5.6%	#2	

=== May 2019 ===
Episode		Original air date	Social media hashtag	AGB Nielsen NUTAM People in Television Homes		Ref.
Episode		Original air date	Social media hashtag	Rating	Timeslot rank	Ref.
46	"Buwis Buhay" (Risk One's Life)	May 1, 2019	#HNABuwisBuhay	5.3%	#2	
47	"Patawad" (Forgive)	May 2, 2019	#HNAPatawad	5.5%	#2	
48	"Ang Pagtatapos" (The End)	May 3, 2019	#HNAAngPagtatapos	6.0%	#2	
