= Alyas Robin Hood season 1 =

Season of a Philippine television drama series

Alyas Robin Hood
- Season 1
- Title card
- Starring: Dingdong Dantes; Megan Young; Andrea Torres
- No. of episodes: 115

Release
- Original network: GMA Network
- Original release: September 19, 2016 – February 24, 2017

Season chronology
- Next → Season 2

The first season of Alyas Robin Hood, a Philippine television drama series on GMA Network, premiered on September 19, 2016 and concluded on February 24, 2017, with a total of 115 episodes. It was replaced by Destined to be Yours in its timeslot.

== Plot ==
After being estranged from his family for some years, Pepe De Jesus (Dingdong Dantes) returns home to make amends with his parents, Jose (Christopher de Leon) and Judy (Jaclyn Jose). Pepe grew up someone who tends to start fights much to the dismay of his father who hates conflicts. He revealed to his family that he has changed his ways and is becoming a lawyer soon and was welcomed by his family including his father who was initially unhappy of his return. Pepe also gets to know a girl, a pediatrician named Sarri Acosta (Megan Young).

All seems well for the De Jesus family until Pepe found his father dead apparently murdered by his own arrow which Pepe owned since he was a teenager. He seeks who was behind for the murder but he was blamed for the death of his own father and was convicted of a crime he didn't commit. While in transit to his prison, the vehicle carrying Pepe was bombed and Pepe along with the vehicle fell from a bridge. He was later found by Venus, (Andrea Torres) who taught him martial arts.

Everyone thought that Pepe is dead. Armed with a bow and arrow made by his best friend, Jekjek (Gio Alvarez), Pepe takes advantage of the situation to find who really was behind the murder of his father under a secret identity. He will also have the opportunity to thwart the illegal operations of those he suspects to be behind his father's murders and the money earned from these illegal operations are redistributed to the people in need which caused him to be known as "Alyas Robin Hood", an alter ego he adopts while he clears his own name.

== Cast and characters ==
=== Main cast ===
- Dingdong Dantes as Jose Paulo "Pepe" de Jesus Jr./Alyas Robin Hood/Crisostomo "Cris" Bonifacio
- Megan Young as Sarri Acosta
- Andrea Torres as Venus Ocampo/Clara Bonifacio

=== Supporting cast ===
- Sid Lucero as Dean Balbuena
- Jaclyn Jose as Judy de Jesus
- Cherie Gil as Margarita "Maggie" Balbuena
- Lindsay De Vera as Lizzy de Jesus/Sakura
- Dave Bornea as Julian Balbuena
- Gary Estrada as Carlos "Caloy" de Jesus
- Dennis Padilla as Wilson Chan
- Gio Alvarez as Jericho "Jekjek" Sumilang
- Paolo Contis as SPO2 Daniel Acosta
- Rey "PJ" Abellana as Leandro Ocampo
- Ces Quesada as Mayor Anita "Cha" Escano
- Antonette Garcia as Frida Estanislao-Aguilar
- Luri Vincent Nalus as Junior "Junjun" Aguilar
- Erlinda Villalobos as Julia "Huling" Sumilang
- Caprice Cayetano as Ecai Sumilang
- Rob Moya as SPO4 Oli Cruz
- Maritess Joaquin as Donya Victoria Acosta
- Michael Flores as Jorel and Llama
- Anthony Falcon as Chino
- Jade Lopez as Chef Pop/Ariana Grenade
- Prince Villanueva as Rex
- Pauline Mendoza as Betchay
- John Feir as Armando Estanislao

==== Special participation ====
- Christopher de Leon as Jose de Jesus Sr.

==== Guest cast ====
- Julius Escarga as young Pepe
- Arjan Jimenez as young Caloy
- Will Ashley De Leon as young Jekjek
- Charles Jacob Briz as young Jojo
- Vic Trio as Tomas Mayuga
- Jay Arcilla as Louie Mayuga
- Tanya Gomez as Chairman Adelita Mayuga
- Sue Prado as Cynthia de Jesus
- Joko Diaz as Mayor Ramon Arguelles
- James Teng as Miggy Arguelles
- Ryza Cenon as Nancy Benitez
- Marnie Lapuz as Maria Benitez
- Dina Bonnevie as Mama Daisy
- Liezel Lopez as Miaka
- Marlann Flores as Honey
- Lucho Ayala as Councilor Paras
- Leanne Bautista as Angela
- Cathy Remperas as Rose
- Diva Montelaba as Maya
- Joross Gamboa as Jojo
- Tammy Brown as Ariana
- Jenny Catchong as Beyonce
- Crissy Marie Rendon as Rihanna
- Aaron Yanga as Ipe
