= You're My Favorite Song =

2026 Philippine television drama series

- Title card
- Genre: Romantic drama
- Written by: Erwin Caezar Bravo
- Directed by: JP Habac
- Starring: Caprice Cayetano; Heath Jornales; John Clifford; Marco Masa
- Opening theme: "You're My Favorite Song" by Princess Aliyah
- Country of origin: Philippines
- Original language: Tagalog
- No. of episodes: 29

Production
- Camera setup: Multiple-camera setup
- Running time: 22-27 minutes
- Production company: GMA Public Affairs

Original release
- Network: GMA Network
- Release: June 22 – July 31, 2026

You're My Favorite Song is a 2026 Philippine television drama romance series broadcast by GMA Network. Directed by JP Habac, it stars Caprice Cayetano, Heath Jornales, John Clifford and Marco Masa. It premiered on June 22, 2026 on the network's Afternoon Prime line up. The series concluded on July 31, 2026, with a total of 29 episodes.

The series is streaming online on YouTube.

== Premise ==
Angel Dimaculangan is a 16-year-old "genius", who moves to Solmera City to help her grandfather–Xavi, whom desires building a resort on their beachfront property. A battle occurs, when the Montaverde Empire sets its sights on their property.

== Cast and characters ==
Lead cast

- Caprice Cayetano as Angel Dimaculangan / Celestine Montaverde
- Heath Jornales as Miguel Miraflor / Captain Serenade
- John Clifford as Calix Arcilla
- Marco Masa as Zion Licaro

Supporting cast

- Boboy Garrovillo as Xavier "Lolo Xavi" Dimaculangan
- Katya Santos as Beverly "Mama Bebe" Dimaculangan
- James Blanco as Enrico Montaverde
- Kazel Kinouchi as Serina Montaverde
- Wilma Doesnt as Maria Rama "Lady Mara" Enriquez
- Paolo Paraiso as Neil Miraflor
- Waynona Collings as Charm
- Princess Aliyah as Adrianna "Adie"
- Geo Mhanna as Jacob
- Lee Victor as Raviel Ocampo
- Kairo Lazarte as Poncy Arzadon
- Andrei Fajardo as Dash Romero

Guest cast

- Shyr Valdez as Mellisa "Ma'am Dragona" Dragona Arzadon
- Matthew Uy as Andrei Arcilla
- Gwen Garci as Kaila Entacia

== Production ==
The series and its cast members were announced on April 25, 2026. Principal photography commenced in June 2026.

== Ratings ==
According to AGB Nielsen Philippines' Nationwide Urban Television Audience Measurement People in television homes, the pilot episode of You're My Favorite Song earned a 3.7% rating. The final episode scored a 4.4% rating.
