= Hiram na Anak =

2019 Philippine television drama series

- Title card
- Also known as: Borrowed Embrace
- Genre: Drama
- Created by: Aloy Adlawan
- Written by: Gina Marissa Tagasa; Anna Aleta-Nadela; Maria Priscilla Hidalgo
- Directed by: Gil Tejada Jr.
- Creative director: Aloy Adlawan
- Starring: Yasmien Kurdi; Dion Ignacio; Leanne Bautista
- Theme music composer: Vehnee Saturno
- Opening theme: "Kung Walang Ikaw" by Hannah Precillas
- Country of origin: Philippines
- Original language: Tagalog
- No. of episodes: 48 (list of episodes)

Production
- Executive producer: Omar Prudente Sortijas
- Editors: Noel S. Mauricio III; Ver Custodio
- Camera setup: Multiple-camera setup
- Running time: 23–28 minutes
- Production company: GMA Entertainment Group

Original release
- Network: GMA Network
- Release: February 25 – May 3, 2019

Hiram na Anak (transl. borrowed child / international title: Borrowed Embrace) is a 2019 Philippine television drama series broadcast by GMA Network. Directed by Gil Tejada Jr., it stars Yasmien Kurdi, Dion Ignacio and Leanne Bautista in the title role. It premiered on February 25, 2019 on the network's afternoon line up. The series concluded on May 3, 2019, with a total of 48 episodes.

The series is streaming online on YouTube.

== Cast and characters ==
Cast

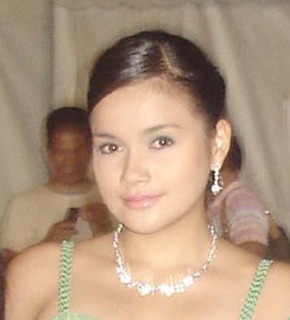
Yasmien Kurdi

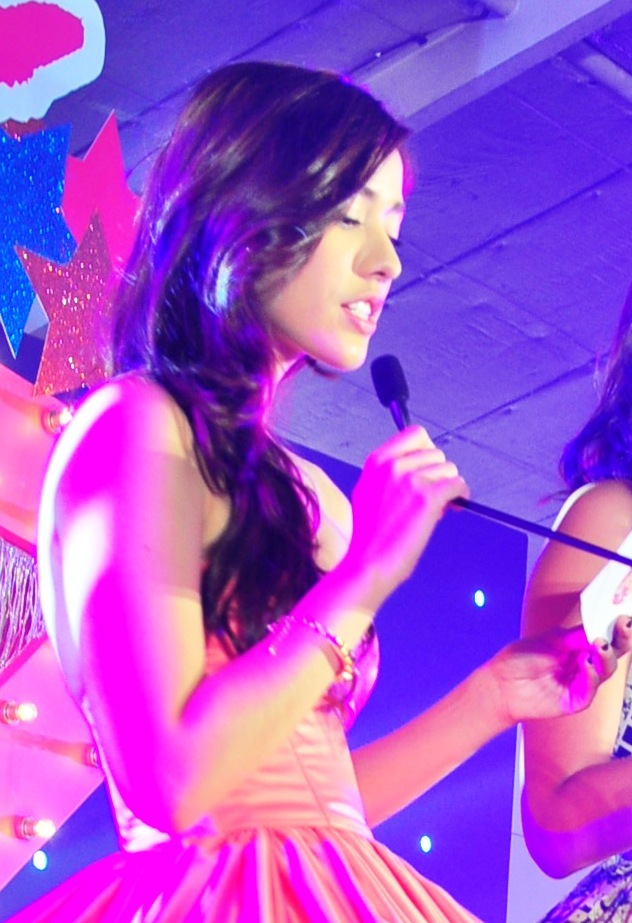
Lauren Young

Lead cast

- Yasmien Kurdi as Miren Alonta-Sandejo
- Dion Ignacio as Adrian Sandejo
- Leanne Bautista as Bernadette "Duday" A. Sandejo

Supporting cast

- Paolo Contis as Benjo Alvarez
- Lauren Young as Odessa "Dessa" Saint
- Empress Schuck as Rowena "Wena" Barrion-Alvarez
- Vaness del Moral as Alma Alonta
- Sef Cadayona as Vince Urbanez
- Maey Bautista as Engke Magpugay
- Rita Avila as Hilda Sandejo

Guest cast

- Kim Belles as Janice
- James Merilo as Arvi
- Marnie Lapus as Maggie
- Tony Mabesa as Pedro
- Tonio Quiazon as Renato
- Kiel Rodriguez as Alex
- Lao Rodriguez as Pabs
- Brylle Mondejar as Martinez
- John Philip Koch as Rigor

== Production ==
Principal photography concluded on April 27, 2019.

== Ratings ==
According to AGB Nielsen Philippines' Nationwide Urban Television Audience Measurement People in television homes, the final episode of Hiram na Anak scored a 6% rating.

== Accolades ==
Accolades received by Hiram na Anak
Year	Award	Category	Recipient	Result	Ref.
2019	33rd PMPC Star Awards for Television	Best Drama Actress	Yasmien Kurdi	Nominated	
