= List of The Cure episodes =

The Cure is a 2018 Philippine television drama series starring Jennylyn Mercado and Tom Rodriguez. The series premiered on GMA Network's GMA Telebabad evening block and worldwide on GMA Pinoy TV from April 30 to July 27, 2018, replacing Sherlock Jr..

NUTAM (Nationwide Urban Television Audience Measurement) People in Television Homes ratings are provided by AGB Nielsen Philippines.

== Series overview ==
Season	Episodes	Originally released	
Season	Episodes	First released	Last released
1	65	April 30, 2018	July 27, 2018

== Episodes ==
In the tables below, the blue numbers represent the lowest ratings and the red numbers represent the highest ratings.

=== April 2018 ===
Episode		Original air date	Social media hashtag	AGB Nielsen NUTAM People in Television Homes			Ref.
Episode		Original air date	Social media hashtag	Rating	Timeslot rank	Whole day rank	Ref.
1	"Pilot"	April 30, 2018	#GMATheCure	9.8%	#2	#6	
Average				9.8%			

=== May 2018 ===
Episode		Original air date	Social media hashtag	AGB Nielsen NUTAM People in Television Homes			Ref.
Episode		Original air date	Social media hashtag	Rating	Timeslot rank	Whole day rank	Ref.
2	"Ang Simula" (The Beginning)	May 1, 2018	#TheCureAngSimula	9.4%	#2	#7	
3	"Patient Zero"	May 2, 2018	#TheCurePatientZero	9.3%	#2	#7	
4	"Side Effect"	May 3, 2018	#TheCureSideEffect	10.1%	#2	#5	
5	"First Victim"	May 4, 2018	#TheCureFirstVictim	10.5%	#2	#5	
6	"Takas" (Escape)	May 7, 2018	#TheCureTakas	10.4%	#2	#4	
7	"Justice for Agnes"	May 8, 2018	#TheCureJustice4Agnes	11.6%	#2	#3	
8	"Resbak" (Fights Back)	May 9, 2018	#TheCureResbak	10.8%	#2	#5	
9	"Frame Up"	May 10, 2018	#TheCureFrameUp	11.7%	#2	#4	
10	"Amok" (Attempt)	May 11, 2018	#TheCureAmok	10.1%	#2	#5	
11	"Rabid"	May 14, 2018	#TheCureRabid	10.5%	#2	#5	
12	"Panic Mode"	May 15, 2018	#TheCurePanicMode	11.2%	#2	#4	
13	"Wanted Infected"	May 16, 2018	#TheCureWantedInfected	11.0%	#2	#5	
14	"Tent City"	May 17, 2018	#TheCureTentCity	10.4%	#4		
15	"Maling Akala" (Illusion)	May 18, 2018	#TheCureMalingAkala	11.5%	#2	#4	
16	"Kuyog" (Horde)	May 21, 2018	#TheCureKuyog	10.9%	#2	#4	
17	"Greg vs. Fernan"	May 22, 2018	#TheCureGregVsFernan	10.7%	#2	#5	
18	"Infected Attack"	May 23, 2018	#TheCureInfectedAttack	11.9%	#2	#4	
19	"Dead End"	May 24, 2018	#TheCureDeadEnd	12.3%	#2	#3	
20	"Family Rescue"	May 25, 2018	#TheCureFamilyRescue	12.5%	#2	#3	
21	"Infected Child"	May 28, 2018	#TheCureInfectedChild	13.1%	#1	#2	
22	"Mother's Love"	May 29, 2018	#TheCureMothersLove	12.8%	#2	#3	
23	"Bagong Nanay" (New Mom)	May 30, 2018	#TheCureBagongNanay	13.2%	#1	#1	
24	"Gorilla Attack"	May 31, 2018	#TheCureGorillaAttack	10.0%	#2		
Average							

=== June 2018 ===
Episode		Original air date	Social media hashtag	AGB Nielsen NUTAM People in Television Homes			Ref.
Episode		Original air date	Social media hashtag	Audience Share	Timeslot rank	Whole day rank	Ref.
25	"Supremo" (Supreme)	June 1, 2018	#TheCureSupremo				
26	"Prison Camp"	June 4, 2018	#TheCurePrisonCamp				
27	"Laban, Charity" (Fight, Charity)	June 5, 2018	#TheCureLabanCharity				
28	"Charity vs. Suzy"	June 6, 2018	#TheCureCharityVsSuzy				
29	"Bitag ni Suzy" (Suzy's Trap)	June 7, 2018	#TheCureBitagNiSuzy				
30	"Alok ni Supremo" (The Supreme's Offer)	June 8, 2018	#TheCureAlokNiSupremo				
31	"Eskapo" (Escape)	June 11, 2018	#TheCureEskapo				
32	"No Fear Charity"	June 12, 2018	#TheCureNoFearCharity				
33	"All For Greg"	June 13, 2018	#TheCureAll4Greg				
34	"Face to Face"	June 14, 2018	#TheCureFaceToFace				
35	"Lupit Ni Supremo" (Supreme's Harshness)	June 15, 2018	#TheCureLupitNiSupremo				
36	"Gulpi de Gulat" (Punch and Shock)	June 18, 2018	#TheCureGulpiDeGulat				
37	"Wedding Ring"	June 19, 2018	#TheCureWeddingRing				
38	"Love and Lies"	June 20, 2018	#TheCureLoveAndLies				
39	"Lusob" (Attacked)	June 21, 2018	#TheCureLusob				
40	"Goodbye Joshua"	June 22, 2018	#TheCureGoodbyeJoshua				
41	"Bistado" (Seen)	June 25, 2018	#TheCureBistado				
42	"Sikreto" (Secret)	June 26, 2018	#TheCureSikreto				
43	"Pagsisisi" (Repentance)	June 27, 2018	#TheCurePagsisisi				
44	"Bagong Kakilala" (New Acquaintance)	June 28, 2018	#TheCureBagongKakilala				
45	"Ang Pagtakas" (The Escape)	June 29, 2018	#TheCureAngPagtakas				
Average							

=== July 2018 ===
Episode		Original air date	Social media hashtag	AGB Nielsen NUTAM People in Television Homes			Ref.
Episode		Original air date	Social media hashtag	Rating	Timeslot rank	Whole day rank	Ref.
46	"Ina o Anak?" (Mother or Child?)	July 2, 2018	#TheCureInaOAnak	8.8%	#2		
47	"Sabwatan" (Conspiracy)	July 3, 2018	#TheCureSabwatan				
48	"Halik" (Kiss)	July 4, 2018	#TheCureHalik				
49	"Alive"	July 5, 2018	#TheCureAlive				
50	"Abot Tanaw" (Horizon)	July 6, 2018	#TheCureAbotTanaw				
51	"Pagsisisi" (Repentance)	July 9, 2018	#TheCurePagsisisi				
52	"Tagpuan" (Setting)	July 10, 2018	#TheCureTagpuan				
53	"Bitag" (Trap)	July 11, 2018	#TheCureBitag				
54	"Big Reveal"	July 12, 2018	#TheCureBigReveal				
55	"Sakop" (Covered)	July 13, 2018	#TheCureSakop				
56	"Finding Hope"	July 16, 2018	#TheCureFindingHope				
57	"Laglag" (Fallen)	July 17, 2018	#TheCureLaglag				
58	"Adira vs. Suzy"	July 18, 2018	#TheCureAdiraVsSuzy				
59	"Starting Over"	July 19, 2018	#TheCureStartingOver	9.4%	#2		
60	"Paalam" (Farewell)	July 20, 2018	#TheCurePaalam	10.1%	#2		
61	"Paglisan" (Leaving)	July 23, 2018	#TheCurePaglisan	9.8%	#2		
62	"Desperate Move"	July 24, 2018	#TheCureDesperateMove				
63	"Because of You"	July 25, 2018	#TheCureBecauseOfU	10.0%	#2		
64	"Saving Greg"	July 26, 2018	#TheCureSavingGreg	10.4%	#2		
65	"End of Tragedy"	July 27, 2018	#TheCureEndOfTragedy	11.0%	#2		
Average							
