= Caprice Cayetano =

Filipino actress (born 2008)

- Born: Caprice Salvador Cayetano; November 10, 2008 (age 18); Rodriguez, Rizal, Philippines
- Occupation: Actress
- Years active: 2013–present
- Agent: Sparkle (2013–present)
- Known for: Kambal, Karibal, Mulawin vs. Ravena
- Title: PBB Collab 2.0; Kapuso Big Winner

Caprice Salvador Cayetano (born November 10, 2008), formerly known as Caprice Mendez is a Filipino actress. Cayetano is a talent of Sparkle GMA Artist Center.

She began her acting career as a child actress and later gained recognition after winning Pinoy Big Brother: Celebrity Collab Edition 2.0.

== Early and personal life ==
Caprice Cayetano was born on November 10, 2008, in Rodriguez, Rizal, Philippines. She is the daughter of Filipino chef Jorge Mendez, who serves as the executive chef and creative director of CIBO. She has a younger brother. Cayetano has cited her father as an influence on her interest in food and has expressed an interest in learning pastry-making.

Cayetano began acting at the age of five. During her early years as an actress, her grandfather helped her memorize scripts by reading them to her repeatedly. She later said that her experiences in acting helped her develop her understanding of the craft and emotions.

Following her participation in Pinoy Big Brother: Celebrity Collab Edition 2.0, Cayetano continued to spend time with her family and former housemates. She described her housemates as having become like another family to her during and after the program.

Cayetano has also described several hobbies and interests. She makes bracelets, plays mobile games with her cousins, and has expressed an interest in baking, vlogging, and singing.

In an April 2026 interview with L'Officiel Philippines, Cayetano discussed her interests in fashion and acting. She described her personal style as incorporating elements of clean-girl and Y2K fashion and said that she enjoys colorful clothing and jewelry.

== Career ==
Cayetano began acting at the age of five and worked as a child actress in several television productions. She rose to prominence when she portrayed the young Criselda in the drama series Kambal, Karibal. Following that role, she appeared in other television dramas, including Hindi Ko Kayang Iwan Ka, Asawa Ko, Karibal Ko, and Prima Donnas.

Her other television appearances included Poor Señorita, URL: Usapang Real Love, Karelasyon, Alyas Robin Hood, Mulawin vs. Ravena, The Lolas' Beautiful Show, Tadhana, Magpakailanman, Stories for the Soul, Maynila, Alex & Amie, Love You Two, and Daddy's Gurl. She also appeared in Daig Kayo ng Lola Ko and other GMA productions.Before joined Pinoy Big Brother: Celebrity Collab Edition 2.0, Cayetano appeared in Cruz vs. Cruz as Jessica Cruz.

In October 2025, Cayetano joined Pinoy Big Brother: Celebrity Collab Edition 2.0 as one of the housemates. She later advanced to the Big Night and was named the Kapuso Big Winner, receiving 61.78% of the final vote. She subsequently described her 127-day stay in the Pinoy Big Brother house as a memorable experience and said that she had developed close relationships with her fellow housemates.

After her Pinoy Big Brother win, Cayetano continued working in television, endorsements, and other entertainment projects. She became a brand ambassador for Wendy's Philippines and later became a face of Smart Prepaid.

In 2026, Cayetano starred as Angel Dimaculangan/Celestine Montaverde in the youth-oriented drama series You're My Favorite Song. The series marked her first television project as lead star. The program aired on GMA Afternoon Prime from June to July 2026.

She was later announced as the lead star of the upcoming GMA Afternoon Prime drama series A Million Dreams, alongside Camille Prats and Angel Guardian. She portrays Eunice, a student who aspires to become a lawyer.

Cayetano also appeared in the music video for TJ Monterde's single Teka Lang, portraying the younger version of Heart Evangelista's character. The music video was directed by John Prats, who praised Cayetano for her performance and professionalism.

== Other activities ==
Following her Pinoy Big Brother: Celebrity Collab Edition 2.0 win, Caprice became involved in several brand and promotional activities. In March 2026, Cayetano donated her prize to the deaf community and children with critical illnesses through The Little Ark Foundation. Later on, she was introduced as a Wendy's Philippines endorser and later participated in the opening of the chain's 100th Philippine store.

Cayetano was also featured in fashion and lifestyle publications. In April 2026, she appeared in an issue of L'Officiel Philippines, where she discussed acting, fashion, hobbies, and her plans for the future. In August 2026, she was featured in Mega (fashion magazine) Faces to Watch series, which highlighted her career and experiences in the entertainment industry.

She was also selected, together with fellow Sparkle artist Heath Jornales, as part of Fujifilm Philippines' Instax squad for the launch of the Instax Mini 13.

Cayetano has expressed interest in expanding her activities beyond acting. She has mentioned baking, vlogging, and singing among the activities she would like to explore, while continuing to pursue acting as her primary career.

== Filmography ==
Key
†	Denotes films that have not yet been released

=== Music video appearance ===
Year	Title	Artist	Role	Ref.
2026	Teka Lang	TJ Monterde	Young Heart Evangelista	

=== Film ===
Year	Title	Role	Notes	Ref.
2013	Barber's Tales	Susan's child (uncredited)		
2015	Felix Manalo	Lilia's daughter	Supporting role	
2017	Trip Ubusan: The Lolas vs. Zombies	Charmaine Nidora Richards	Supporting role	
2019	Mystified	Kylie	Supporting role	
2026	Amir	Soraya	Supporting role, 2026 MMFF entry	

=== Television ===
Year	Title	Role	Notes	Ref.
2014	Strawberry Lane	Luisa	Supporting role	
2015	Kalyeserye	Charmaine Nidora Smash Faulkerson	Supporting role	
2016	Poor Señorita	Kimberly "Girlie" Salcedo-Reyes	Supporting role	
2016	URL: Usapang Real Love: Dream Date	Diana Daenarys "Diddy" Cablao	Supporting role	
2016	Karelasyon: Third Eye	Kylie	Supporting Role - Ep. 81	
2016–2017	Alyas Robin Hood	Ekay	Supporting role	
2017	Mulawin vs. Ravena	Tagaktak	Supporting role	
2017	Kambal, Karibal	Young Criselda/Cristianna Enriquez-Magpantay	Supporting role	
2017	The Lolas' Beautiful Show	Herself/Charmaine	Regular cast	
2018	Hindi Ko Kayang Iwan Ka	Angela Angeles	Supporting role	
2018	Stories for the Soul:Tinig ng Pananalig	Jena	Supporting role - Ep.8	
2018–2019	Asawa Ko, Karibal Ko	Nicole Belle Bravante	Supporting role	
2019	Alex & Amie	Amie (voice)	Supporting role	
2019	Prima Donnas	Young Donna Belle	Supporting role	
2019	Love You Two	Alex Borromeo	Supporting role	
2019	Daddy's Gurl	Nosbi	Supporting role	
2019	Maynila: Little Angel	Baninay	Supporting role	
2023	Mga Lihim ni Urduja	Young Gem	Various roles	
2024	Wish Ko Lang!	Various roles	Guest roles	
2024	Abot-Kamay na Pangarap	Apple Francisco	Supporting role	
2025	Beyond 75: The GMA 75th Anniversary Special	Herself	Special appearance	
2025	Lolong: Bayani ng Bayan	Kidnap Victim	Guest role	
2025–2026	Cruz vs Cruz	Jessica Cruz	Main role	
2025–2026	Pinoy Big Brother: Celebrity Collab Edition 2.0	Housemate	Big Winner	
2026–present	All Out Sundays	Herself	Guest performer	
2026–present	TiktoClock	Herself	Guest appearance	
2026	You're My Favorite Song	Angel Dimaculangan/Celestine Montaverde	Main role	
2026	Family Feud	Herself	Guest player - EP. 957	
2026	Fast Talk with Boy Abunda	Herself	Guest - Ep. 802, Ep. 877	
TBA	A Million Dreams †	Eunice	Main role	

=== Anthologies ===
Year	Title	Role	Note(s)	Ref.
2017	Tadhana	Eya Del Rosario	Episode 15: "Biyahero"	
2018	Tadhana	Frankie	Episode 79: "Kidnap"	
2019	Tadhana	Betchay	Episode 104: "Menor de edad"	
2019	Tadhana	Ariella	Episodes 125–126: "Haunted Love"	
2019	Tadhana	Rose	Episodes 131–132: "Sisters at War"	
2025	Tadhana	Maxi	Episodes 340–342: "Love Thy Neighbor"	
2017	Magpakailanman	Belen	Episode 208: "Ang Rampa ng Buhay Ko: The Sinon Loresca Jr. Story"	
2017	Magpakailanman	Duday	Episode 214: "Hanggang sa Iyong Paggising, Daddy: The Aguilar Family Story"	
2017	Magpakailanman	Norabelle	Episode 228: "OFW: Homeless in Hongkong – The Mildred Perez Story"	
2018	Magpakailanman	Young Kyline	Episode 263: "Ang Munti Kong Pangarap: The Kyline Alcantara Story"	
2018	Magpakailanman	Young Golden	Episode 285: "Top of the Clash: The Golden Cañedo Story"	
2019	Magpakailanman	Young Rasha	Episode 333: "Psychic from Dumaguete: The Rasha Mae Sarne Story"	
2022	Magpakailanman	Nicole	Episode 417: "The Mother Who Left: The Fralei Gabor Story"	
2025	Magpakailanman	Arlene	Episode 538: "Takas ng Mag-ina"	
2018	Daig Kayo ng Lola Ko	Pinang	Episode 37: "Alamat ng Pinya"	
2025	Daig Kayo ng Lola Ko	Kaye	Episodes 247–249: "Squad Game"	

== Awards and nominations ==
Award	Year	Category	Nominated work	Result	Ref.
Anak TV Seal Awards 2025	2025	Net Makabata Star	—N/a	Won	
6th TAG Victorious Awards Chicago	2026	TAG Most Promising Female Star	—N/a	Won	
7th Village Pipol Choice Awards	2026	Promising Female of the Year	—N/a	Nominated	
7th Village Pipol Choice Awards	2026	VP Face of the Year - Female Teen	—N/a	Won	
7th Village Pipol Choice Awards	2026	Female Star of the Night	—N/a	Won	
RAWR Awards 2026	2026	Breakthrough Artist of the Year	—N/a	Won	
