= List of Hindi Ko Kayang Iwan Ka episodes =

Hindi Ko Kayang Iwan Ka (International title: Stay With Me / Lit: I Can Not Leave You) is a 2018 Philippine television drama series starring Yasmien Kurdi, Mike Tan, Martin del Rosario and Jackie Rice. The series premiered on GMA Network's GMA Afternoon Prime block and worldwide on GMA Pinoy TV from February 26 to August 31, 2018, replacing Haplos.

NUTAM (Nationwide Urban Television Audience Measurement) People in Television Homes ratings are provided by AGB Nielsen Philippines. The series ended, but its the 26th-week run, and with a total of 132 episodes. It was replaced by My Special Tatay.

== Series overview ==
Season	Episodes	Originally released	
Season	Episodes	First released	Last released
1	132	February 26, 2018	August 31, 2018

== List of Episodes ==
=== February 2018 ===
Episode		Original air date	Social media hashtag	AGB Nielsen NUTAM People in Television Homes			Ref.
Episode		Original air date	Social media hashtag	Rating	Timeslot rank	Whole day rank	Ref.
1	"Pilot"	February 26, 2018	#HindiKoKayangIwanKa	5.3%	#1	#14	
2	"Ang Biyenan" (The Mother-in-Law)	February 27, 2018	#HKKIKAngBiyenan	5.2%	#1	#15	
3	"Positive"	February 28, 2018	#HKKIKPositive	4.9%	#1	#15	
Average				5.1%			

=== March 2018 ===
Episode		Original air date	Social media hashtag	AGB Nielsen NUTAM People in Television Homes			Ref.
Episode		Original air date	Social media hashtag	Rating	Timeslot rank	Whole day rank	Ref.
4	"Saan Nakuha" (Where Got)	March 1, 2018	#HKKIKSaanNakuha	4.5%	#2	#15	
5	"Fifth Episode"	March 2, 2018	#HindiKoKayangIwanKa	4.3%	#2	#17	
6	"Pagdududa" (Mistrust)	March 5, 2018	#HKKIKPagdududa	4.3%	#2	#17	
7	"Bistado" (Busted)	March 6, 2018	#HKKIKBistado	4.4%	#2	#18	
8	"Kambal Negative" (Twins Negative)	March 7, 2018	#HKKIKKambalNegative	4.0%	#2	#19	
9	"Layas" (Get Out)	March 8, 2018	#HKKIKLayas	5.0%	#1	#14	
10	"Ultimatum"	March 9, 2018	#HKKIKUltimatum	4.7%	#2	#18	
11	"Ava Temptation"	March 12, 2018	#HKKIKAvaTemptation	4.2%	#2	#20	
12	"Sugod, Marco" (Go, Marco)	March 13, 2018	#HKKIKSugodMarco	4.4%	#1	#16	
13	"Banta ni Adel" (Adel's Threat)	March 14, 2018	#HKKIKBantaNiAdel	4.3%	#1	#17	
14	"1 Million"	March 15, 2018	#HKKIK1Million	4.7%	#1	#15	
15	"Video Scandal"	March 16, 2018	#HKKIKVideoScandal	4.7%	#1	#15	
16	"Laban Bawi" (Fight Back)	March 19, 2018	#HKKIKLabanBawi	—N/a			
17	"Away Tsismis" (Rumor Fight)	March 20, 2018	#HKKIKAwayTsismis	—N/a			
18	"Adel-Ava Scheme"	March 21, 2018	#HKKIKAdelAvaScheme	—N/a			
19	"Fake Love Affair"	March 22, 2018	#HKKIKFakeLoveAffair	—N/a			
20	"Ipaglalaban" (Fighting)	March 23, 2018	#HKKIKIpaglalaban	4.6%	#1	#15	
21	"Custody Battle"	March 26, 2018	#HKKIKCustodyBattle	4.3%	#2	#18	
22	"Mother Love"	March 27, 2018	#HKKIKMotherLove	4.4%	#2	#19	
23	"Guilt Trip"	March 28, 2018	#HKKIKGuiltTrip		#2		
Average							

=== April 2018 ===
Episode		Original air date	Social media hashtag	AGB Nielsen NUTAM People in Television Homes			Ref.
Episode		Original air date	Social media hashtag	Rating	Timeslot rank	Whole day rank	Ref.
24	"Blackmail"	April 2, 2018	#HKKIKBlackmail		#2		
25	"Takas" (Escape)	April 3, 2018	#HKKIKTakas		#2		
26	"Sugod" (Dash)	April 4, 2018	#HKKIKSugod		#2		
27	"Suhol" (Bribe)	April 5, 2018	#HKKIKSuhol		#2		
28	"Face Off"	April 6, 2018	#HKKIKFaceOff		#2		
29	"Laban, Thea" (Fight, Thea)	April 9, 2018	#HKKIKLabanThea		#2		
30	"Desperada" (Desperate)	April 10, 2018	#HKKIKDesperada	6.2%	#1		
31	"Fight On"	April 11, 2018	#HKKIKFightOn		#2		
32	"Annulment"	April 12, 2018	#HKKIKAnnulment		#2		
33	"Kagat" (Bite)	April 13, 2018	#HKKIKKagat		#2		
34	"Party No Entry"	April 16, 2018	#HKKIKPartyNoEntry	5.4%	#1		
35	"Sampal" (Slap)	April 17, 2018	#HKKIKSampal	6.0%	#1		
36	"Away Kabit" (Mistress Fight)	April 18, 2018	#HKKIKAwayKabit	5.9%	#1		
37	"See You in Court"	April 19, 2018	#HKKIKSeeYouInCourt	5.7%	#1		
38	"Kambal Kidnap" (Twins Kidnap)	April 20, 2018	#HKKIKKambalKidnap	5.7%	#1		
39	"Sagasa" (Bump)	April 23, 2018	#HKKIKSagasa	5.7%	#1		
40	"Sakripisyo" (Sacrifice)	April 24, 2018	#HKKIKSakripisyo	5.7%	#1		
41	"End of the Road"	April 25, 2018	#HKKIKEndOfTheRoad	5.5%	#1		
42	"Buwis Buhay" (Life Threat)	April 26, 2018	#HKKIKBuwisBuhay	5.7%	#1		
43	"Bagong Pag-asa" (New Hope)	April 27, 2018	#HKKIKBagongPagAsa	5.8%	#1		
44	"Confession"	April 30, 2018	#HKKIKConfession	6.6%	#1		
Average							

=== May 2018 ===
Episode		Original air date	Social media hashtag	AGB Nielsen NUTAM People in Television Homes			Ref.
Episode		Original air date	Social media hashtag	Rating	Timeslot rank	Whole day rank	Ref.
45	"Guilty"	May 1, 2018	#HKKIKGuilty	8.3%	#1		
46	"Katotohanan" (Truth)	May 2, 2018	#HKKIKKatotohanan	7.6%	#1		
47	"Nasaan si Thea?" (Where is Thea?)	May 3, 2018	#HKKIKNasaanSiThea	7.6%	#1		
48	"Bilanggo sa Dilim" (Prisoner in the Dark)	May 4, 2018	#HKKIKBilanggoSaDilim	6.9%	#1		
49	"Finding Thea"	May 7, 2018	#HKKIKFindingThea				
50	"Thea Eskapo" (Thea's Escape)	May 8, 2018	#HKKIKTheaEskapo				
51	"Leap of Faith"	May 9, 2018	#HKKIKLeapOfFaith				
52	"Payback Time"	May 10, 2018	#HKKIKPaybackTime				
53	"Bail Out"	May 11, 2018	#HKKIKBailOut	6.7%	#1		
54	"Ava Desperada" (Desperate Ava)	May 14, 2018	#HKKIKAvaDesperada	5.5%	#1		
55	"Fatal Attraction"	May 15, 2018	#HKKIKFatalAttraction	6.4%	#1		
56	"Starting Over"	May 16, 2018	#HKKIKStartingOver	6.8%	#1		
57	"Stairway Rumble"	May 17, 2018	#HKKIKStairwayRumble	5.7%	#1		
58	"Preggie Ava"	May 18, 2018	#HKKIKPreggieAva	6.1%	#1		
59	"Second Chance"	May 21, 2018	#HKKIKSecondChance				
60	"Adel Mortality"	May 22, 2018	#HKKIKAdelMortality				
61	"Brain Tumor"	May 23, 2018	#HKKIKBrainTumor				
62	"Hospital Clash"	May 24, 2018	#HKKIKHospitalClash				
63	"Sugod, Ava" (Go, Ava)	May 25, 2018	#HKKIKSugodAva				
64	"Goodbye Baby"	May 28, 2018	#HKKIKGoodbyeBaby	6.5%	#1		
65	"Hit and Run"	May 29, 2018	#HKKIKHitAndRun	6.6%	#1		
66	"Affair Getaway"	May 30, 2018	#HKKIKAffairGetaway	7.0%	#1		
67	"Baby Project"	May 31, 2018	#HKKIKBabyProject	6.5%	#1		
Average							

=== June 2018 ===
Episode		Original air date	Social media hashtag	AGB Nielsen NUTAM People in Television Homes			Ref.
Episode		Original air date	Social media hashtag	Audience Share	Timeslot rank	Whole day rank	Ref.
68	"Beach Encounter"	June 1, 2018	#HKKIKBeachEncounter	5.5%	#1		
69	"Thea Lason" (Thea's Poison)	June 4, 2018	#HKKIKTheaLason	5.6%	#1		
70	"Ava Wanted"	June 5, 2018	#HKKIKAvaWanted	5.6%	#1		
71	"Preggie Again"	June 6, 2018	#HKKIKPreggieAgain	5.8%	#1		
72	"Marco Selos" (Envious Marco)	June 7, 2018	#HKKIKMarcoSelos	6.5%	#1		
73	"Sampal" (Slap)	June 8, 2018	#HKKIKSampal	6.8%	#1		
74	"Party Intriga" (Party Intrigue)	June 11, 2018	#HKKIKPartyIntriga	7.1%	#1		
75	"Ambush"	June 12, 2018	#HKKIKAmbush	8.2%	#1		
76	"Edgar Kutob" (Edgar Beat)	June 13, 2018	#HKKIKEdgarKutob	6.7%	#1		
77	"Daddy Edward"	June 14, 2018	#HKKIKDaddyEdward	6.7%	#1		
78	"Baby Blackmail"	June 15, 2018	#HKKIKBabyBlackmail	7.3%	#1		
79	"Secret Hit"	June 18, 2018	#HKKIKSecretHit	5.8%	#1		
80	"The Secret"	June 19, 2018	#HKKIKTheSecret				
81	"Killer Ava"	June 20, 2018	#HKKIKKillerAva				
82	"Nasaan Ka, Nay Magda?" (Where Are You, Mom Magda?)	June 21, 2018	#HKKIKNasaanKaNayMagda				
83	"Magda CCTV"	June 22, 2018	#HKKIKMagdaCCTV				
84	"Edgar Busted"	June 25, 2018	#HKKIKEdgarBusted	6.7%	#1		
85	"Confession"	June 26, 2018	#HKKIKConfession	6.2%	#1		
86	"Hukay" (Grave)	June 27, 2018	#HKKIKHukay	6.7%	#1		
87	"Suhol" (Bribe)	June 28, 2018	#HKKIKSuhol	5.1%	#1		
88	"Sumbat" (Plug)	June 29, 2018	#HKKIKSumbat	6.0%	#1		
Average							

=== July 2018 ===
Episode		Original air date	Social media hashtag	AGB Nielsen NUTAM People in Television Homes			Ref.
Episode		Original air date	Social media hashtag	Rating	Timeslot rank	Whole day rank	Ref.
89	"Paalam Magda" (Goodbye Magda)	July 2, 2018	#HKKIKPaalamMagda	5.1%	#1		
90	"Edgar Presscon"	July 3, 2018	#HKKIKEdgarPresscon	5.3%	#1		
91	"Ava Freedom"	July 4, 2018	#HKKIKAvaFreedom	5.6%	#1		
92	"Rubout"	July 5, 2018	#HKKIKRubout	5.0%	#1		
93	"Elvira Banta" (Elvira's Threat)	July 6, 2018	#HKKIKElviraBanta	5.7%	#1		
94	"Dragon Lady"	July 9, 2018	#HKKIKDragonLady	5.6%	#1		
95	"Surveillance"	July 10, 2018	#HKKIKSurveillance	5.5%	#1		
96	"Adel Betrayal"	July 11, 2018	#HKKIKAdelBetrayal	6.7%	#1		
97	"Standoff"	July 12, 2018	#HKKIKStandoff	6.1%	#1		
98	"Bomb Plot"	July 13, 2018	#HKKIKBombPlot	6.0%	#1		
99	"Staycation"	July 16, 2018	#HKKIKStaycation	6.1%	#1		
100	"Bomba" (Bomb)	July 17, 2018	#HKKIKBomba	6.0%	#1		
101	"Pasabog" (Petard)	July 18, 2018	#HKKIKPasabog	7.6%	#1		
102	"Dukot" (Pull)	July 19, 2018	#HKKIKDukot	6.5%	#1		
103	"Halik ni Ava" (Ava's Kiss)	July 20, 2018	#HKKIKHalikNiAva	6.8%	#1		
104	"Twins Missing"	July 24, 2018	#HKKIKTwinsMissing	6.6%	#1		
105	"Paalam Adel" (Goodbye Adel)	July 25, 2018	#HKKIKPaalamAdel	6.2%	#1		
106	"Twins Bad News"	July 26, 2018	#HKKIKTwinsBadNews	6.9%	#1		
107	"Thea Dalamhati" (Thea's Grief)	July 27, 2018	#HKKIKTheaDalamhati	5.8%	#1		
108	"Pagluluksa" (Mourning)	July 30, 2018	#HKKIKPagluluksa	5.2%	#1		
109	"Pangungulila" (Desolation)	July 31, 2018	#HKKIKPangungulila	5.4%	#1		
Average				5.9%			

=== August 2018 ===
Episode		Original air date	Social media hashtag	AGB Nielsen NUTAM People in Television Homes			Ref.
Episode		Original air date	Social media hashtag	Rating	Timeslot rank	Whole day rank	Ref.
110	"Marco Jr."	August 1, 2018	#HKKIKMarcoJr	5.3%	#1		
111	"Selos" (Envy)	August 2, 2018	#HKKIKSelos	5.5%	#2		
112	"Husgado" (Court)	August 3, 2018	#HKKIKHusgado	5.8%	#1		
113	"Edward Intriga" (Edward's Intrigue)	August 6, 2018	#HKKIKEdwardIntriga	6.3%	#1		
114	"Angela's Encounter"	August 7, 2018	#HKKIKAngelaEncounter	6.0%	#1		
115	"Lawrence the Imbestigador" (Lawrence the Investigator)	August 8, 2018	#HKKIKLawrenceImbestigador	6.2%	#1		
116	"Nasaan Ka, Angela?" (Where Are You, Angela?)	August 9, 2018	#HKKIKNasaanKaAngela	6.7%	#1		
117	"Ebidensya" (Evidence)	August 10, 2018	#HKKIKEbidensya	6.4%	#1		
118	"Fever Pitch"	August 13, 2018	#HKKIKFeverPitch	6.8%	#1		
119	"To the Rescue"	August 14, 2018	#HKKIKToTheRescue	6.2%	#1		
120	"Aborted Reunion"	August 15, 2018	#HKKIKAbortedReunion	5.1%	#1		
121	"Twins' Safehouse"	August 16, 2018	#HKKIKTwinsSafehouse	6.1%	#1		
122	"Twins' Eskapo" (Twins' Escape)	August 17, 2018	#HKKIKTwinsEskapo	6.7%	#1		
123	"Twins Paghahanap" (Twins' Finding)	August 20, 2018	#HKKIKTwinsPaghahanap	6.6%	#1		
124	"Reunited at Last"	August 21, 2018	#HKKIKReunitedAtLast	7.2%	#1	#12	
125	"Panganib" (Danger)	August 22, 2018	#HKKIKPanganib	6.2%	#1	#12	
126	"Elvira Kondisyon" (Elvira's Condition)	August 23, 2018	#HKKIKElviraKondisyon	6.0%	#1	#14	
127	"Sumbat ni Thea" (Thea's Plug)	August 24, 2018	#HKKIKSumbatNiThea	6.1%	#1	#12	
128	"Pagtutuos" (Reckoning)	August 27, 2018	#HKKIKPagtutuos	6.3%	#1	#14	
129	"Rebelasyon" (Revelation)	August 28, 2018	#HKKIKRebelasyon	6.9%	#1	#9	
130	"Marco the Spy"	August 29, 2018	#HKKIKMarcoSpy	6.6%	#1	#13	
131	"Shoot to Kill"	August 30, 2018	#HKKIKShootToKill	7.1%	#1	#11	
132	"Walang Iwanang Wakas" (Never Parting Finale)	August 31, 2018	#HKKIKWalangIwanangWakas	8.2%	#1	#10	
Average				6.3%			
