= Hindi Ko Kayang Iwan Ka =

2018 Philippine television drama series

- Title card
- Also known as: Stay with Me
- Genre: Drama
- Created by: Maria Zita S. Garganera
- Written by: Suzette Doctolero; Anna Aleta-Nadela; Maria Zita S. Garganera
- Directed by: Maryo J. de los Reyes; Neal del Rosario
- Creative director: Roy Iglesias
- Starring: Yasmien Kurdi
- Theme music composer: Vehnee Saturno
- Opening theme: "Hindi Ko Kayang Iwan Ka" by Hannah Precillas
- Country of origin: Philippines
- Original language: Tagalog
- No. of episodes: 132 (list of episodes)

Production
- Executive producer: Milo Alto Paz
- Editor: Robert S. Pancho
- Camera setup: Multiple-camera setup
- Running time: 25–38 minutes
- Production company: GMA Entertainment Content Group

Original release
- Network: GMA Network
- Release: February 26 – August 31, 2018

Hindi Ko Kayang Iwan Ka (transl. I cannot leave you / international title: Stay with Me) is a 2018 Philippine television drama series broadcast by GMA Network. Directed by Maryo J. de los Reyes and Neal del Rosario, it stars Yasmien Kurdi. It premiered on February 26, 2018 on the network's Afternoon Prime line up. The series concluded on August 31, 2018, with a total of 132 episodes.

The series is streaming online on YouTube.

== Premise ==
The story revolves around Thea Balagtas. After getting married and raising their twins together, her life shatters when she tests positive for HIV.

== Cast and characters ==
Cast

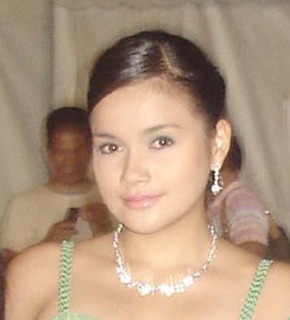
Yasmien Kurdi

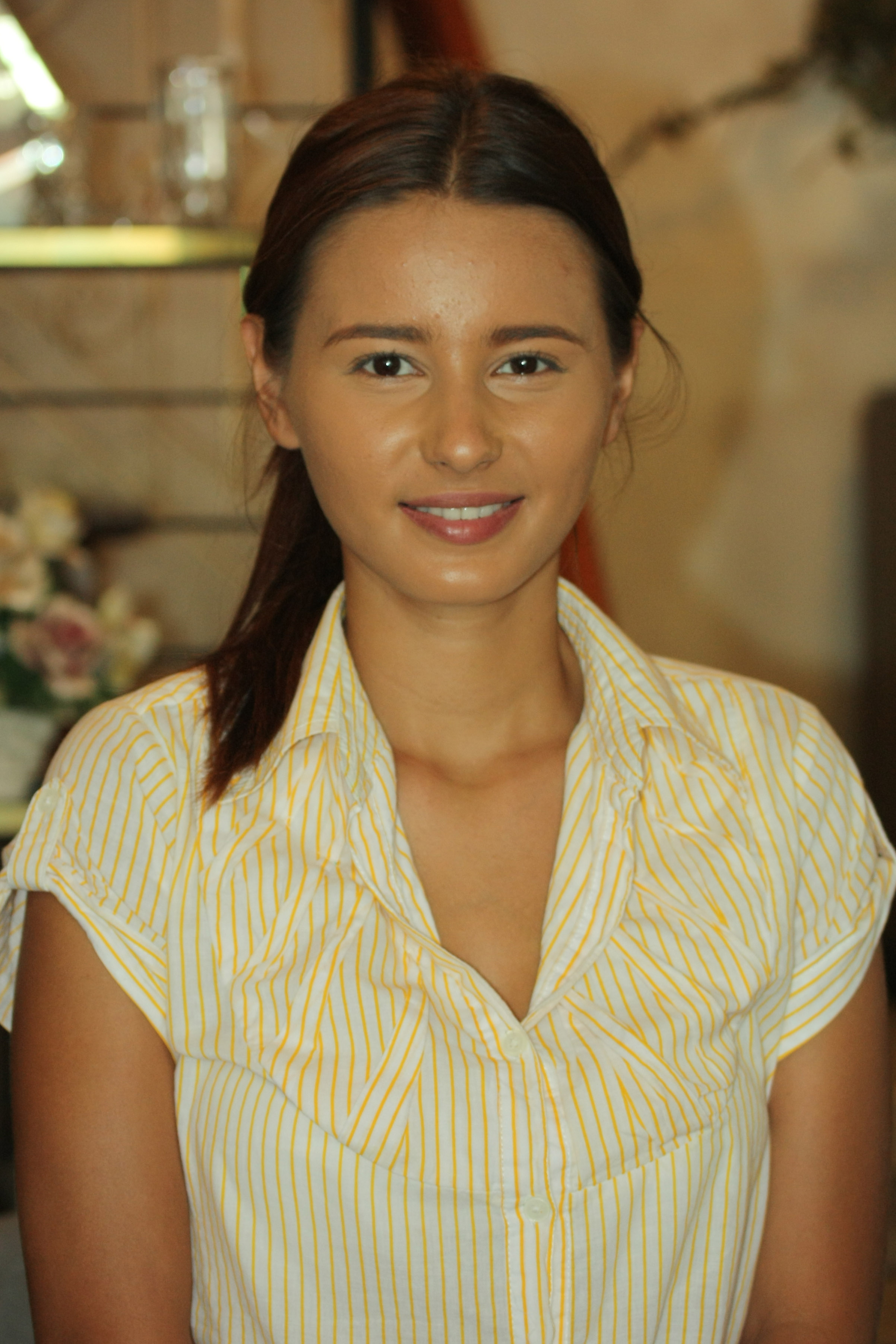
Jackie Rice

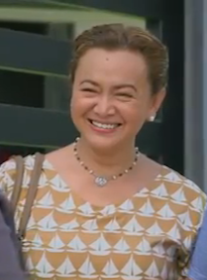
Sharmaine Buencamino

Lead cast

- Yasmien Kurdi as Althea "Thea" Balagtas-Angeles

Supporting cast

- Martin del Rosario as Lawrence de Leon
- Jackie Rice as Ava V. Imperial
- Mike Tan as Marco Angeles
- Shamaine Buencamino as Magdalena "Magda" Balagtas
- Charee Pineda as Rosanna "Anna" Balagtas
- Ina Feleo as Sophia Angeles
- Mike "Pekto" Nacua as Tantoy Cruz
- Catherine Rem as Olga Cruz
- Caprice Cayetano as Angela B. Angeles
- Seth dela Cruz as Maurice B. Angeles
- Gina Alajar as Adelaida "Adele" Angeles

Guest cast

- Lucho Ayala as Rommel
- Paolo Gumabao as Raffy
- Ameera Johara as Nikka Martinez
- Rob Moya as Edgar Villar
- Reese Tuazon as Leila
- Lharby Policarpio as Andy
- Rodjun Cruz as Edward Salazar
- Jackie Lou Blanco as Elvira Villar-Policarpio
- Lloyd Samartino as Manuel Policarpio
- Tonio Quiazon as Gado
- Arrian Labios as Tantoy
- Omar Flores as Bernie Silvestre
- Jeff Luna as Elvira's bodyguard
- Aleera Montalla as Tess
- Alvin Maghanoy as Dodot
- Francis Mata as Mike
- Joemarie Nielsen as Ogie
- Ces Aldaba as a doctor
- Mike Lloren as Manuel Imperial
- Eddie Ngo as a hotel tenant
- Renerich Ocon as a maid
- Star Orjaliza as a doctor
- Peggy Rico Tuazon as a doctor
- Mona Louise Rey as younger Ava

== Production ==
Principal photography commenced in January 2018. Filming concluded on August 23, 2018.

== Ratings ==
According to AGB Nielsen Philippines' Nationwide Urban Television Audience Measurement People in television homes, the pilot episode of Hindi Ko Kayang Iwan Ka earned a 5.3% rating. The final episode scored an 8.2% rating.

== Accolades ==
Accolades received by Hindi Ko Kayang Iwan Ka
Year	Award	Category	Recipient	Result	Ref.
2018	32nd PMPC Star Awards for Television	Best Daytime Drama Series	Hindi Ko Kayang Iwan Ka	Nominated	
2018	32nd PMPC Star Awards for Television	Best Drama Actress	Yasmien Kurdi	Won	
2018	32nd PMPC Star Awards for Television	Best Child Performer	Caprice Cayetano Seth dela Cruz	Nominated	
2018	32nd PMPC Star Awards for Television	Best Child Performer	Caprice Cayetano Seth dela Cruz	Won	
