= The Cure (TV series) =

2018 Philippine television drama series

- Title card
- Genre: Science fiction drama
- Created by: Dode Cruz
- Written by: Dode Cruz; Luningning Ribay; Glaiza Ramirez; Lobert Villela
- Directed by: Mark A. Reyes V
- Creative director: Roy Iglesias
- Starring: Jennylyn Mercado; Tom Rodriguez
- Country of origin: Philippines
- Original language: Tagalog
- No. of episodes: 65 (list of episodes)

Production
- Executive producer: Winnie Hollis-Reyes
- Editors: Robert Ryan Reyes; Noel Mauricio
- Camera setup: Multiple-camera setup
- Running time: 24–41 minutes
- Production company: GMA Entertainment Content Group

Original release
- Network: GMA Network
- Release: April 30 – July 27, 2018

The Cure is a 2018 Philippine television drama science fiction series broadcast by GMA Network. Directed by Mark A. Reyes V, it stars Jennylyn Mercado in the title role and Tom Rodriguez. It premiered on April 30, 2018 on the network's Telebabad line up. The series concluded on July 27, 2018, with a total of 65 episodes.

The series is streaming online on YouTube.

== Premise ==
The life of Greg, Charity and Hope take a turn when Greg's mother is diagnosed with late-stage cancer. Desperate to find a treatment, Greg gets his hands on an experimental drug made by Evangeline Lazaro and gives it to his mother. The drug becomes the root of a zombie infection that threatens to spread all over the city. Greg, Charity, Evangeline and her son, Joshua will start to find a cure.

== Cast and characters ==
Cast

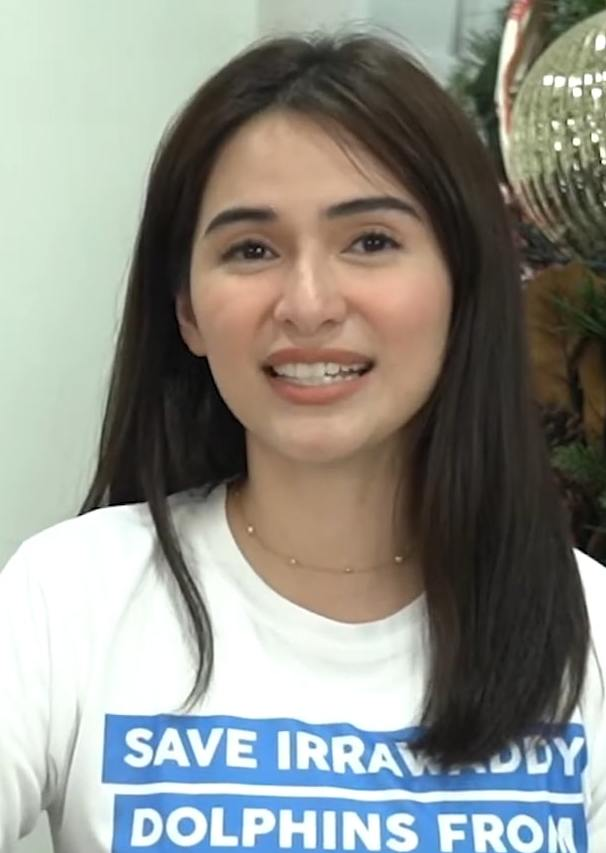
Jennylyn Mercado

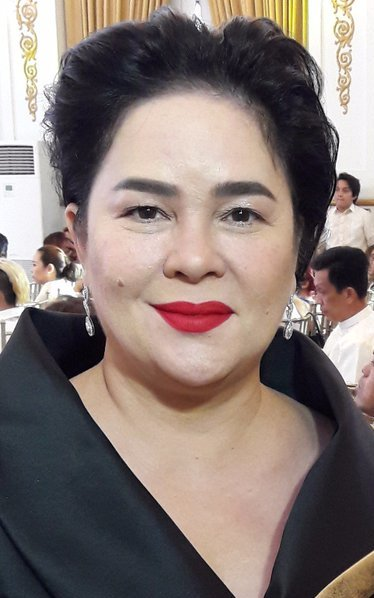
Jaclyn Jose

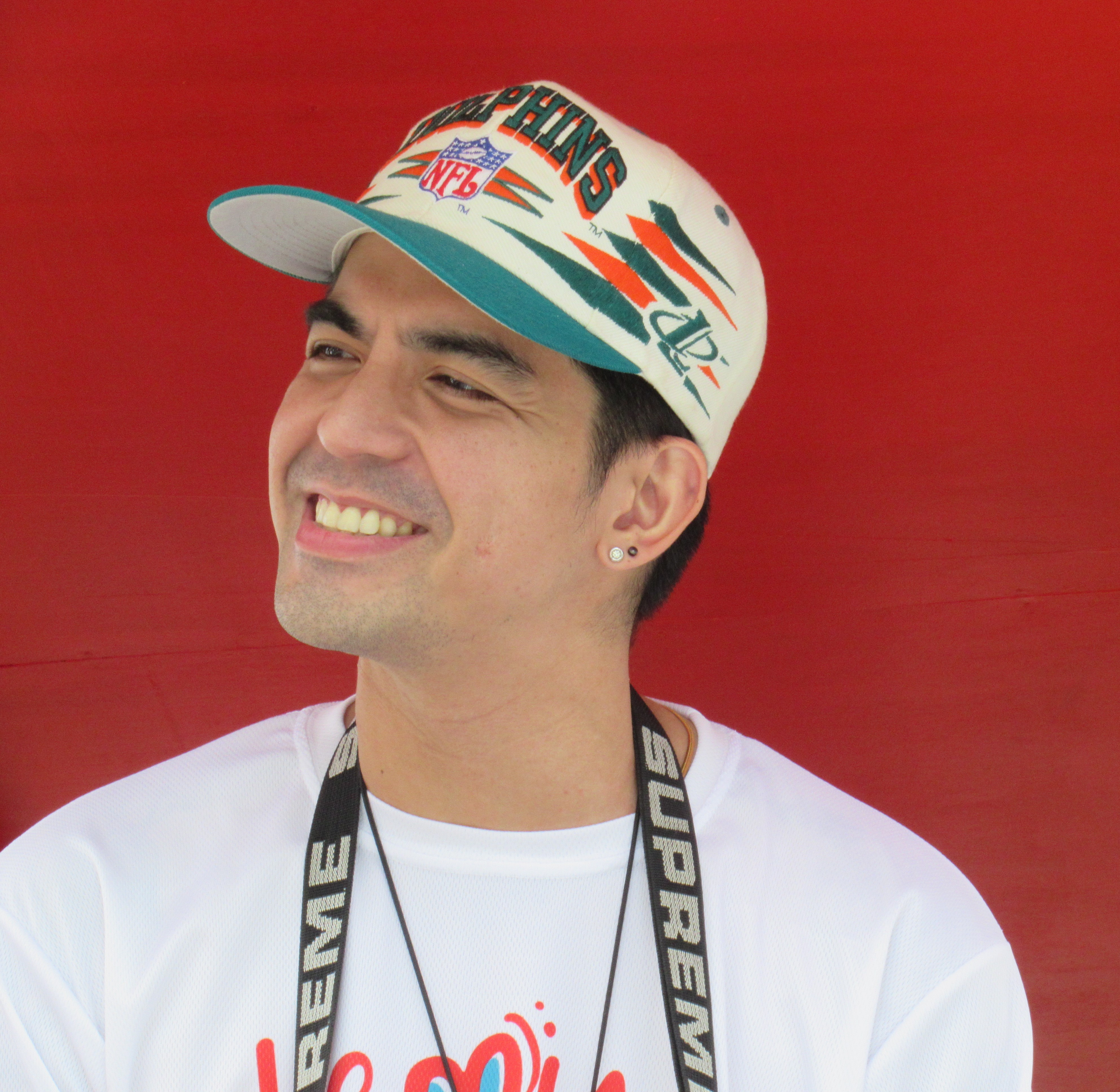
Mark Herras

Lead cast

- Jennylyn Mercado as Charity “Charie” Valdez-Salvador
- Tom Rodriguez as Gregory “Greg” Salvador

Supporting cast

- Mark Herras as Darius
- LJ Reyes as Katrina Contes
- Jay Manalo as Fernan / Supremo
- Jaclyn Jose as Evangeline Lazaro
- Ronnie Henares as Eduardo
- Diva Montelaba as Suzy
- Arra San Agustin as Anna Mercado-Lazaro
- Leanne Bautista as Hope V. Salvador

Guest cast

- Ken Chan as Joshua "Josh" Lazaro
- Irma Adlawan as Agnes Salvador
- Glenda Garcia as Lorna Valdez
- Maricris Garcia as Josie
- John Feir as Jimboy Marquez
- Jhoana Marie Tan as April Sison
- Gerald Madrid as Lito Sison
- Edwin Reyes as Jomalesa
- Jenzel Angeles as Josie
- Angela Evangelista as MY
- Bruce Roeland as Dex
- Kris Bernal as Myra
- Matt Evans as Elmer
- Jacob Briz as Yel
- Jazz Yburan as Aja
- Vincent Magbanua as Lowie
- Yul Servo as Lando
- Kiel Rodriguez as Arvin
- Shyr Valdez as Becky
- Teresa Loyzaga as Mariz Almijarez
- Renz Valerio as Cesar
- Lotlot de Leon as Rosita
- Kylie Padilla as Adira Aguilar
- Emilio Garcia as Rudy Aguilar
- Pen Medina as Rigor
- Ruru Madrid as Xavier
- Janice Hung as Valda

== Production ==
Principal photography commenced in February 2018. Filming concluded in July 2018.

== Ratings ==
According to AGB Nielsen Philippines' Nationwide Urban Television Audience Measurement People in television homes, the final episode of The Cure scored an 11.1% rating.

== Accolades ==
Accolades received by The Cure
Year	Award	Category	Recipient	Result	Ref.
2018	32nd PMPC Star Awards for Television	Best Child Performer	Leanne Bautista	Nominated	
