= Heath Jornales =

Filipino actor and singer (born 2009)

- Born: Heath Michael Estrada Jornales; May 5, 2009 (age 17); Taguig City, Philippines
- Occupations: Actor; Singer; Songwriter; Martial artist
- Years active: 2024–present
- Agent: Sparkle (2024–present)
- Parent: Michael Roy Jornales (father)
- Website: Heath Jornales on Spotify

Heath Michael Jornales (born May 5, 2009) is a Filipino actor and singer-songwriter. He is a talent of Sparkle GMA Artist Center. Jornales was a housemate on Pinoy Big Brother: Celebrity Collab Edition 2.0, where he finished as the Kapuso Second Big Placer. He later appeared in the youth drama series You're My Favorite Song and released his self-titled extended play, Heath Jornales, in 2026.

== Early and personal life ==
Heath Jornales was born on May 5, 2009, in Taguig City, Philippines. He is the second of three siblings and the only son. He has two sisters, Heather and Harah.

His father is actor, martial artist, and fight director Michael Roy Jornales, who portrayed Chikoy Rivera in Ang Probinsyano. His mother, Jemalene "Jem" Estrada, is a former actress who appeared in the films Cool Dudes 24/7 (2001) and Crying Ladies (2003) before leaving the entertainment industry to focus on her family.

Jornales developed an interest in martial arts through his father. He has trained in several martial arts, including taekwondo, Muay Thai, boxing, jiu-jitsu, arnis, and nunchaku. He has also expressed an interest in pursuing action roles and enjoys recreational motorcycling.

Jornales completed junior high school at KeyEd Learning Center. He later attended Grade 11 as a homeschooled student. He has expressed an interest in music and other creative activities. He plays guitar and has an interest in drawing, animation, and stop-motion projects. He also enjoys skating, basketball, football, and badminton.

== Career ==
Jornales began appearing in television commercials at the age of nine. He later began his acting career with GMA Network. He appeared in several GMA productions, including Lolong as Niño and Pepito Manaloto as Buwie Tiangco. He later portrayed Gelo in Mga Batang Riles and Caleb Salvador in Encantadia Chronicles: Sang'gre.

In 2025, Jornales joined the reality television series Pinoy Big Brother: Celebrity Collab Edition 2.0 as a Sparkle housemate. He advanced to the Big Night and became the only male Kapuso housemate to reach the Big 4. He was named the Kapuso Second Big Placer, receiving 24.25% of the public votes. He remained on stage alongside fellow Kapuso housemate Caprice Cayetano during the final announcements.

In 2026, Jornales appeared in the primetime series Never Say Die as Keith. In June, he was cast as Miguel Miraflor in the youth-oriented series You're My Favorite Song, which marked his first lead role in a television production.

He later joined the cast of the action series Taskforce Firewall in a recurring role. He was also announced as part of the cast of the upcoming drama Hari ng Tondo.

He is set to make his feature-film debut in Amir, an upcoming fantansy-film scheduled for release at the 2026 Metro Manila Film Festival in December.

== Music ==
Heath is also a singer and songwriter. He began writing songs at the age of 13. During his participation in Pinoy Big Brother: Celebrity Collab Edition 2.0, where he finished as the second big placer, he performed several of his original compositions. In July 2026, he released his self-titled extended play, Heath Jornales, a six-track EP released under StarPop. The EP marked his debut as a recording artist.

The EP includes the original songs "Back to You (Acoustic Version)", "Back to You (Main Version)", "Far Away", "Promised Land", "Coffee Shop", and "Ikaw Pa Rin Hanggang Ngayon". It reached number one on the iTunes Philippines Albums Chart. His debut single, "Back to You", reached one million streams in June 2026.

Jornales wrote "Coffee Shop" in 2023 while spending time with a friend and playing video games. He later performed his songs on Unang Hirit and It's Showtime.

On April 19, 2026, Jornales held his first fan convention, Heath Wave: The Ultimate Fan Jam, at the SM North EDSA Skydome. The event included performances and demonstrations of taekwondo, boxing, and arnis. At the time, he was also appearing as Keith in the primetime series Never Say Die.

In July 2026, his first solo concert, Heath's Time, was rescheduled from July 19 to September 5, 2026, at the New Frontier Theater in Quezon City. The concert was organized by StarPop and Sparkle GMA Artist Center.

== Other Activities ==
In May 2026, Jornales, together with fellow Sparkle artist Caprice Cayetano, was selected as part of Fujifilm Philippines' Instax squad for the launch of the Instax Mini 13.

In September 2026, Jornales appeared on the cover of VMan Southeast Asia's Volume 06, titled The Present Issue, in a feature titled “All Eyes on Heath.”

== Discography ==
=== Extended plays ===
- Heath Jornales (2026)

=== Singles ===
- "Back to You" (2026)
  - Main Version
  - Acoustic Version

=== Other songs ===
- "Summer Nights"
- "Promised Land"
- "Coffee Shop"
- "Ikaw Pa Rin Hanggang Ngayon"
- "Far Away"

== Filmography ==
Key
†	Denotes films that have not yet been released

=== Film ===
Year	Title	Role	Notes	Ref.
2026	Amir	Jamal	Supporting role, 2026 MMFF entry	

=== Television ===
Year	Title	Role	Notes	Ref.
2024	Pepito Manaloto	Buwie Tiangco	Guest role - Ep. 108	
2025	Lolong: Bayani ng Bayan Season 2	Niño	Guest - Ep. 66-67	
2025	Mga Batang Riles	Gelo	Recurring role	
2025	Encantadia Chronicles: Sang'gre	Caleb Salvador	Supporting role	
2025–2026	Pinoy Big Brother: Celebrity Collab Edition 2.0	Himself	Housemate (Second Big Placer)	
2025–present	TiktoClock	Himself	Guest	
2025–present	Family Feud	Himself	Guest player - EP. 138, 957, 1035	
2026	Never Say Die	Keith	Guest role	
2026	You're My Favorite Song	Miguel Miraflor	Main role	
2026	Taskforce Firewall	Gilbert	Recurring role	
2026	Fast Talk with Boy Abunda	Himself	Guest - Ep. 804, 877, 924	
TBA	Hari ng Tondo †	Kiel Ventura	TBA	

== Awards and nominations ==
Award	Year	Category	Nominated work	Result	Ref.
6th TAG Victorious Awards Chicago	2026	TAG Most Promising Male Star	—N/a	Won	
7th Village Pipol Choice Awards	2026	Promising Male of the Year	—N/a	Nominated	
7th Village Pipol Choice Awards	2026	VP Face of the Year - Male Teen	—N/a	Won	
