= Never Say Die (Philippine TV series) =

2026 Philippine television drama series

- Title card
- Genre: Action; Drama
- Written by: Denoy Navarro-Punio; Emerson Jake Somera; Loi Argel Nova
- Directed by: Dominic Zapata; Richard Arellano
- Creative director: Aloy Adlawan
- Starring: Jillian Ward; David Licauco
- Country of origin: Philippines
- Original language: Tagalog
- No. of episodes: 78

Production
- Executive producer: Erwin Manzano-Hilado
- Camera setup: Multiple-camera setup
- Running time: 21–33 minutes
- Production company: GMA Entertainment Group

Original release
- Network: GMA Network
- Release: February 2 – May 22, 2026

Never Say Die is a 2026 Philippine television drama action series broadcast by GMA Network. Directed by Dominic Zapata and Richard Arellano, it stars Jillian Ward and David Licauco. It premiered on February 2, 2026 on the network's Prime line up. The series concluded on May 22, 2026, with a total of 78 episodes.

The series is streaming online on YouTube.

== Premise ==
Technology expert, Joey Delgado works alongside Andrew Dizon, an investigative journalist and the person who exposed Delgado's father. They are joined by Peter Santos, Delgado's best friend and Jin-Ho Lee, an agent from South Korea. They will solve a conspiracy involving the fugitive Liza De Leon and Dizon's brother-in-law, Tomas Limjoco – the mastermind of a drug empire.

== Cast and characters ==
Lead cast

- Jillian Ward as Joey Delgado
- David Licauco as Andrew Dizon

Supporting cast

- Ji Soo as Jin-Ho Lee
- Raymart Santiago as Miguel Delgado
- Richard Yap as Tomas Limjoco
- Raheel Bhyria as Peter Santos
- Angelu de Leon Clarissa Delgado
- Analyn Barro as Golda Briones
- Wendell Ramos as Diego Aglipay
- Ayen Munji-Laurel as Yvette Dizon-Limjoco
- Gina Alajar as Rebecca Dizon
- Tanjo Villoso
- Winwyn Marquez as Theresa Park

Guest cast

- Eman Bacosa Pacquiao
- Heath Jornales

== Development ==
The series and its cast members were announced in July 2025. Principal photography commenced in August 2025.

== Ratings ==
According to AGB Nielsen Philippines' Nationwide Urban Television Audience Measurement People in television homes, the pilot episode of Never Say Die earned an 7.1% rating. The final episode scored an 8% rating.
