= Alyas Robin Hood season 2 =

Season of a Philippine television drama series

Alyas Robin Hood
- Season 2
- Title card
- Starring: Dingdong Dantes; Andrea Torres; Ruru Madrid; Solenn Heussaff
- No. of episodes: 75

Release
- Original network: GMA Network
- Original release: August 14 – November 24, 2017

Season chronology
- ← Previous; Season 1

The second season of Alyas Robin Hood, is a 2017 Philippine television drama series on GMA Network, premiered on August 14, 2017 replacing My Love From The Star and taking the timeslot of Mulawin vs. Ravena, and concluded on November 24, 2017, with a total of 75 episodes. It was replaced by Kambal, Karibal on its timeslot.

== Plot ==
After the death of Sarri, the story of the main hero will continue to unfold about Judy and her kidnappers; as Pepe saves his mother, he unravel the truths about a new rebellion, about his real identity, and a new journey and missions of solving conspiracies along with Venus, the love of his life before their grand wedding of the century.

== Cast and characters ==
=== Main cast ===
- Dingdong Dantes as Atty. Jose Paulo "Pepe" de Jesus Jr./Atty. Jose Paulo Albano/Alyas Robin Hood
- Andrea Torres as Venus Torralba/Felicidad/Marla/Aphrodite Mendoza
- Ruru Madrid as Andres Silang/Yoyo Boy
- Solenn Heussaff as Iris Rebecca Lizeralde

=== Supporting cast ===
==== Remaining ====
- Jaclyn Jose as Kapitana Judy de Jesus/Lola SadAko/Victorina Deogracia y Villadolid
- Rey "PJ" Abellana as Leandro Torralba
- Gio Alvarez as Jericho "Jekjek" Sumilang
- Paolo Contis as Senior Inspector Daniel Acosta
- Rob Moya as SPO2 Alex Cruz
- Antonette Garcia as Frida
- Luri Vincent Nalus as Junjun
- Prince Villanueva as Rex

==== Additional ====
- Edu Manzano as Governor Emilio Albano
- Jay Manalo as Pablo Rodrigo
- KC Montero as SPO2 Rigor Morales
- Super Tekla as Yvonne Lady
- Kiel Rodriguez as SPO4 Brix Sandoval
- Rodjun Cruz as SPO2 Miguel Chua
- Geleen Eugenio as Yaya Chona
- Kenken Nuyad as Totoy Bingo
- Rochelle Pangilinan as Diana dela Vega

=== Flashback Appearances ===
- Sid Lucero as Dean Balbuena
- Cherie Gil as Margarita "Maggie" Balbuena
- Christopher de Leon as Jose Paulo de Jesus, Sr.
- Megan Young as Dr. Sarri Acosta
- Tanya Gomez as Kapitana Adelita Mayuga

=== Guest stars ===
- Empress Schuck as young Judy de Jesus
- Gab de Leon as young Jose Paulo de Jesus Sr.
- Arkin del Rosario as young Governor Emilio Albano
- Hiro Peralta as Miguel Rodrigo
- Ina Feleo as Rosetta Rodrigo
- Elle Ramirez as Reporter Susan Meneses
- Stephanie Sol as Rhodora
- Tess Bomb Maranon as Eloisa
- Jason Francisco as Matias
- Lharby Policarpio as Gerald
- Ces Aldaba as Judge
- Crispin Pineda as Priest
- Joshua Zamora as Benjo
- Norman King as Abog
- Lou Veloso as Tanglaw
- Denise Barbacena as Prisoner 1
- Arny Ross as Prisoner 2
- Mara Alberto as Prisoner 3
- Sheena Halili as Lily
- Phytos Ramirez as Kevin
- Kevin Sagra as Patrick
- Karlo Duterte as Jason
- Gabby Eigenmann as Doc Gabriel
- Lotlot de Leon as Sionnie
- Anette Samin as Missing child
- Kiko Estrada as Iking
- Mikee Quintos as Marya
- Joe Gruta as Lolo Marcelino
- Banjo Romero as Gusting
- Dindo Arroyo as Boss Pacquito Domingo

=== Former cast ===
==== Supporting ====
- Lindsay de Vera as Lizzy de Jesus
- Dave Bornea as Julian Balbuena
- Gary Estrada as Carlos "Caloy" de Jesus

== Production ==
=== Timeslot changes ===
It premiered on August 14, 2017 on the 7:45 PM slot, and GMA-7, the network behind the show, moved Mulawin vs. Ravena on the 8:30 PM slot. On September 18, 2017, following Super Ma'am's premiere, the network put it back on its original 8:30 PM slot.

=== Filming ===
Principal photography commenced on July 20, 2017.
