= List of Alyas Robin Hood episodes =

Alyas Robin Hood is a Philippine drama-action series broadcast by GMA Network starring Dingdong Dantes together with an ensemble cast. It premiered on September 19, 2016, on GMA Telebabad prime time block and also aired worldwide on GMA Pinoy TV. The first season ended its 23-week run on February 24, 2017, with a total of 115 episodes, and replaced by Destined to be Yours.

The second season premiered on August 14, 2017, and ended November 24, 2017, after its 15-week run with 75 episodes, and was replaced by Kambal, Karibal.

According to its producers the series was inspired by the English folklore Robin Hood.

Urban Luzon and NUTAM (Nationwide Urban Television Audience Measurement) ratings are provided by AGB Nielsen Philippines while Kantar Media Philippines provide Nationwide ratings (Urban + Rural).

== Series overview ==
Season	Episodes	Originally released	
Season	Episodes	First released	Last released
1	115	September 19, 2016	February 24, 2017
2	75	August 14, 2017	November 24, 2017

== Episodes ==
=== Season 1 (2016–2017) ===
==== September 2016 ====
No. overall	No. in season	Episode	Original air date	Social media hashtag	AGB Nielsen Urban Luzon			Kantar Media Nationwide			ProdCode	Ref.
No. overall	No. in season	Episode	Original air date	Social media hashtag	Rating	Timeslot rank	Whole day rank	Rating	Timeslot rank	Whole day rank	ProdCode	Ref.
1	1	"Premiere"	September 19, 2016	#AstiGMA	21.3%	#1	#4	19.3%	#2	#7	1001 - A	
2	2	"Unang Laban" (First battle)	September 20, 2016	#ARHUnangLaban	23.8%	#1	#4	22.1%	#2	#7	1002 - B	
3	3	"Soulmate"	September 21, 2016	#ARHSoulmate	22.9%	#1	#4	21.9%	#2	#7	1004 - D	
4	4	"Pepe versus Dean"	September 22, 2016	#ARHPepeVsDean	24.0%	#1	#2	21.2%	#2	#6	1005 - E	
5	5	"Congrats Pepe"	September 23, 2016	#ARHCongratsPepe	22.5%	#1	#3	—N/a	—N/a	—N/a	1003 - C	
6	6	"Biktima" (Victim)	September 26, 2016	#ARHBiktima	20.7%	#1	#4	18.5%	#2	#7	1006 - F	
7	7	"Not Guilty"	September 27, 2016	#ARHNotGuilty	22.8%	#1	#4	20.7%	#2	#7	1008 - H	
8	8	"Ebidensiya" (Evidence)	September 28, 2016	#ARHEbidensiya	21.7%	#1	#4	18.7%	#2	#7	1006 - G	
9	9	"Pepe in Danger"	September 29, 2016	#ARHPepeInDanger	23.2%	#1	#4	21.3%	#2	#7	1010 - J	
10	10	"Pepe's Saviour"	September 30, 2016	#ARHPepesSaviour	22.8%	#1	#2	20.6%	#2	#6	1011 - K	
Average					22.6%			20.5%				

==== October 2016 ====
No. overall	No. in season	Episode	Original air date	Social media hashtag	AGB Nielsen Urban Luzon			Kantar Media Nationwide			Ref.
No. overall	No. in season	Episode	Original air date	Social media hashtag	Rating	Timeslot rank	Whole day rank	Rating	Timeslot rank	Whole day rank	Ref.
11	11	"Reunited"	October 3, 2016	#ARHReunited	22.2%	#1	#4	19.4%	#2	#7	1012 - L
12	12	"To the Rescue"	October 4, 2016	#ARHToTheRescue	22.8%	#1	#3	21.0%	#2	#7	1009 - I
13	13	"Sikreto ni Venus" (Secret of Venus)	October 5, 2016	#ARHSikretoNiVenus	23.9%	#1	#3	22.4%	#2	#7	1014 - N
14	14	"Pepe versus Zombies"	October 6, 2016	#ARHPepeVsZombies	25.3%	#1	#3	22.1%	#2	#6	1013 - M
15	15	"Pepe's Mission"	October 7, 2016	#ARHPepesMission	23.0%	#1	#3	21.2%	#2	#6	1015 - O
16	16	"Judy in Trouble"	October 10, 2016	#ARHJudyInTrouble	23.6%	#1	#3	21.0%	#2	#7	1017 - Q
17	17	"Resbak ni Pepe" (Backup of Pepe)	October 11, 2016	#ARHResbakNiPepe	23.9%	#1	#4	21.6%	#2	#7	1016 - P
18	18	"Dog Eye"	October 12, 2016	#ARHDogEye	21.3%	#1	#4	18.1%	#2	#8	1019 - S
19	19	"The Chase"	October 13, 2016	#ARHTheChase	24.3%	#1	#4	21.1%	#2	#6	1018 - R
20	20	"Missing Baby"	October 14, 2016	#ARHMissingBaby	22.8%	#1	#3	21.1%	#2	#7	1022 - V
21	21	"Saving a Baby"	October 17, 2016	#ARHSavingABaby	23.0%	#1	#4	21.1%	#2	#7	1020 - T
22	22	"Diskarte Ni Dean" (Strategy of Dean)	October 18, 2016	#ARHDiskarteNiDean	23.6%	#1	#4	21.0%	#2	#7	1021 - U
23	23	"Kutob Ni Pepe" (Hunch of Pepe)	October 19, 2016	#ARHKutobNiPepe	18.6%	#1	#4	—N/a	—N/a	—N/a	1026 - Z
24	24	"Gate-crasher"	October 20, 2016	#ARHGateCrasher	26.0%	#1	#3	—N/a	—N/a	—N/a	1024 - X
25	25	"Sarri and Venus"	October 21, 2016	#ARHSarriAndVenus	24.5%	#1	#3	21.7%	#1	#4	1023 - W
26	26	"Harapan" (Face-off)	October 24, 2016	#ARHHarapan	23.6%	#1	#3	20.2%	#2	#7	1025 - Y
27	27	"Venus versus Nancy"	October 25, 2016	#ARHVenusVsNancy	24.0%	#1	#3	21.0%	#2	#7	1028 - BB
28	28	"Robin Hood for the Win"	October 26, 2016	#ARHRobinHoodForTheWin	24.5%	#1	#3	20.8%	#2	#7	1029 - CC
29	29	"Father Pepe"	October 27, 2016	#ARHFatherPepe	24.9%	#1	#3	—N/a	—N/a	—N/a	1027 - AA
30	30	"Witness"	October 28, 2016	#ARHWitness	23.5%	#1	#3	20.3%	#2	#7	1030 - DD
31	31	"Daniel in Trouble"	October 31, 2016	#DanielInTrouble	23.3%	#1	#3	20.8%	#2	#7	1032 - FF
Average					23.5%			20.9%			

==== November 2016 ====
No. overall	No. in season	Episode	Original air date	Social media hashtag	AGB Nielsen Urban Luzon			Kantar Media Nationwide			ProdCode	Ref.
No. overall	No. in season	Episode	Original air date	Social media hashtag	Rating	Timeslot rank	Whole day rank	Rating	Timeslot rank	Whole day rank	ProdCode	Ref.
32	32	"Alyas Robin Hood"	November 1, 2016	#AlyasRobinHood	23.1%	#1	#2	20.4%	#2	#6	1031 - EE	
33	33	"Impostor"	November 2, 2016	#ARHImpostor	23.4%	#1	#3	20.3%	#2	#7	1033 - GG	
34	34	"Fake Hero"	November 3, 2016	#ARHFakeHero	24.5%	#1	#3	20.7%	#2	#7	1034 - HH	
35	35	"The Real Hero"	November 4, 2016	#ARHTheRealHero	24.7%	#1	#2	21.3%	#2	#7	1036 - JJ	
36	36	"Jealous Pepe"	November 7, 2016	#ARHJealousPepe	21.8%	#1	#3	19.1%	#2	#7	1035 - II	
37	37	"Meeting Sarri"	November 8, 2016	#ARHMeetingSarri	23.0%	#1	#3	21.4%	#2	#7	1037 - KK	
38	38	"Paalam Sarri" (Goodbye Sarri)	November 9, 2016	#ARHPaalamSarri	23.7%	#1	#3	21.2%	#2	#7	1038 - LL	
39	39	"Pepe Moves On"	November 10, 2016	#ARHPepeMovesOn	26.2%	#1	#3	21.8%	#2	#7	1040 - NN	
40	40	"Gate Crashers"	November 11, 2016	#ARHGateCrashers	25.6%	#1	#3	22.3%	#2	#7	1039 - MM	
41	41	"Hulihin si Wilson" (Chase Wilson)	November 14, 2016	#ARHHulihinSiWilson	24.4%	#1	#3	—N/a	—N/a	—N/a	1042 - PP	
42	42	"Wilson in Trouble"	November 15, 2016	#WilsonInTrouble	23.4%	#1	#3	—N/a	—N/a	—N/a	1041 - OO	
43	43	"Pepe Gives Back"	November 16, 2016	#ARHPepeGivesBack	24.0%	#1	#3	22.3%	#2	#6	1043 - QQ	
44	44	"Fake Death"	November 17, 2016	#ARHFakeDeath	23.5%	#1	#3	21.2%	#2	#7	1044 - RR	
45	45	"New Mission"	November 18, 2016	#ARHNewMission	22.3%	#1	#3	—N/a	—N/a	—N/a	1045 - SS	
46	46	"Mama Daisy"	November 21, 2016	#ARHMamaDaisy	21.7%	#1	#3	20.9%	#2	#6	1046 - TT	
47	47	"Huli Si Pepe" (Pepe is Caught)	November 22, 2016	#ARHHuliSiPepe	20.6%	#1	#4	—N/a	—N/a	—N/a	1048 - VV	
48	48	"Finding Pepe"	November 23, 2016	#ARHFindingPepe	20.9%	#1	#4	21.1%	#2	#6	1047 - UU	
49	49	"Anger Games"	November 24, 2016	#ARHAngerGames	20.6%	#1	#4	19.7%	#2	#7	1049 - WW	
50	50	"Laban ni Pepe" (Fight of Pepe)	November 25, 2016	#ARHLabanNiPepe	23.2%	#1	#3	21.2%	#2	#7	1050 - XX	
					AGB Nielsen NUTAM			Kantar Media Nationwide				
51	51	"Saving Pepe"	November 28, 2016	#ARHSavingPepe	20.2%	#1	#5	21.3%	#2	#6	1051 - YY	
52	52	"Cos Fight"	November 29, 2016	#ARHCosFight	20.3%	#1	#5	21.8%	#2	#6	1052 - ZZ	
53	53	"Responde" (Respond)	November 30, 2016	#ARHResponde	20.7%	#1	#4	22.9%	#2	#6	1053 - AAA	
Average					23.2%			21.0%				

==== December 2016 ====
No. overall	No. in season	Episode	Original air date	Social media hashtag	AGB Nielsen NUTAM			Kantar Media Nationwide			ProdCode	Ref.
No. overall	No. in season	Episode	Original air date	Social media hashtag	Rating	Timeslot rank	Whole day rank	Rating	Timeslot rank	Whole day rank	ProdCode	Ref.
54	54	"The Kiss"	December 1, 2016	#ARHTheKiss	22.6%	#1	#3	23.5%	#2	—N/a	1054 - BBB	
55	55	"Alyas Robin Hood"	December 2, 2016	#AlyasRobinHood	20.1%	#1	#4	21.6%	#2	#6	1055 - CCC	
56	56	"Kutob" (Hunch)	December 5, 2016	#ARHKutob	21.5%	#1	#4	22.4%	#2	#6	1057 - EEE	
57	57	"Pagtatagpo" (Encounter)	December 6, 2016	#ARHPagtatagpo	21.8%	#1	#4	20.7%	#2	#7	1056 - DDD	
58	58	"Bagong Pepe" (New Pepe)	December 7, 2016	#ARHBagongPepe	23.3%	#1	#4	23.0%	#2	#6	1058 - FFF	
59	59	"Night with Sarri"	December 8, 2016	#ARHNightWithSarri	21.1%	#1	#4	22.7%	#2	#6	1059 - GGG	
60	60	"Hamunan"	December 9, 2016	#ARHHamunan	21.8%	#1	#4	21.7%	#2	#6	1061 - III	
61	61	"Pagpapanggap" (Impersonation)	December 12, 2016	#ARHPagpapanggap	21.1%	#1	#4	22.2%	#2	#5	1060 - HHH	
62	62	"New Target"	December 13, 2016	#ARHNewTarget	20.8%	#1	#4	21.7%	#2	#6	1062 - JJJ	
63	63	"Strikes Back"	December 14, 2016	#ARHStrikesBack	21.4%	#1	#4	21.1%	#2	#5	1063 - KKK	
64	64	"Hinala ni Sarri" (Suspicion of Sarri)	December 15, 2016	#ARHHinalaNiSarri	20.1%	#1	#4	22.4%	#2	#4	1064 - LLL	
65	65	"Remembering Pepe"	December 16, 2016	#ARHRememberingPepe	19.0%	#1	#3	19.3%	#2	#6	1067 - OOO	
66	66	"Banta Kay Pepe" (Threat for Pepe)	December 19, 2016	#ARHBantaKayPepe	21.7%	#1	#4	23.3%	#2	#5	1066 - NNN	
67	67	"Revelation"	December 20, 2016	#ARHRevelation	21.2%	#1	#4	20.9%	#2	#5	1065 - MMM	
68	68	"Pagbubunyag" (Revelation)	December 21, 2016	#ARHPagbubunyag	21.1%	#1	#4	—N/a	—N/a	—N/a	1068 - PPP	
69	69	"Face to Face"	December 22, 2016	#ARHFaceToFace	23.0%	#1	#2	21.0%	#2	#5	1069 - QQQ	
70	70	"Denial King"	December 23, 2016	#ARHDenialKing	20.9%	#1	#3	20.4%	#2	#5	1071 - SSS	
71	71	"No Way Out"	December 26, 2016	#ARHNoWayOut	21.0%	#1	#3	20.2%	#2	#6	1070 - RRR	
72	72	"Aminan" (Confess)	December 27, 2016	#ARHAminan	20.6%	#1	#2	20.5%	#2	#6	1073 - UUU	
73	73	"Pusong Sawi" (Heartbroken)	December 28, 2016	#ARHPusongSawi	20.3%	#1	#3	19.3%	#2	#6	1072 - TTT	
74	74	"Small World"	December 29, 2016	#ARHSmallWorld	21.3%	#1	#2	19.3%	#2	#6	1074 - VVV	
75	75	"Venus Moves On"	December 30, 2016	#ARHVenusMovesOn	20.0%	#1	#2	19.1%	#2	#5	1076 - XXX	
Average					21.2%			21.1%				

==== January 2017 ====
No. overall	No. in season	Episode	Original air date	Social media hashtag	AGB Nielsen NUTAM			Kantar Media Nationwide			ProdCode	Ref.
No. overall	No. in season	Episode	Original air date	Social media hashtag	Rating	Timeslot rank	Whole day rank	Rating	Timeslot rank	Whole day rank	ProdCode	Ref.
76	76	"Mud Wrestling"	January 2, 2017	#ARHMudWrestling	20.8%	#1	#4	19.1%	#2	#6	1075 - WWW	
77	77	"Tamang Hinala" (Correct suspicion)	January 3, 2017	#ARHTamangHinala	21.7%	#1	#3	18.9%	#2	#6	1077 - YYY	
78	78	"Mind Change"	January 4, 2017	#ARHMindChange	21.4%	#1	#3	19.1%	#2	#6	1078 - ZZZ	
79	79	"Pepe Meets Romulo"	January 5, 2017	#ARHPepeMeetsRomulo	21.7%	#1	#3	19.5%	#2	#6	1080 - b	
80	80	"Forgiveness"	January 6, 2017	#ARHForgiveness	20.9%	#1	#3	18.2%	#2	#6	1079 - a	
81	81	"Pagbawi" (Recovery)	January 9, 2017	#ARHPagbawi	21.6%	#1	#4	19.8%	#2	#6	1081 - c	
82	82	"Tugisin si Pepe" (Hound Pepe)	January 10, 2017	#ARHTugisinSiPepe	22.3%	#1	#4	21.6%	#2	#6	1082 - d	
83	83	"Mano Y Mano"	January 11, 2017	#ARHManoYMano	21.9%	#1	#4	20.8%	#2	#6	1083 - e	
84	84	"Pepe versus Caloy"	January 12, 2017	#ARHPepeVsCaloy	22.7%	#1	#3	22.0%	#2	#6	1084 - f	
85	85	"Secret Enemy"	January 13, 2017	#ARHSecretEnemy	20.9%	#1	#4	20.0%	#2	#6	1085 - g	
86	86	"Pepe versus Venus"	January 16, 2017	#ARHPepeVsVenus	20.1%	#1	#4	19.1%	#2	#5	1087 - i	
87	87	"Change of Heart"	January 17, 2017	#ARHChangeOfHeart	21.5%	#1	#3	19.8%	#2	#6	1086 - h	
88	88	"Changing Venus"	January 18, 2017	#ARHChangingVenus	21.4%	#1	#3	20.0%	#2	#6	1088 - j	
89	89	"Dean versus Daniel"	January 19, 2017	#ARHDeanVsDaniel	20.8%	#1	#4	19.3%	#2	#6	1089 - k	
90	90	"Gising Venus" (Wake up Venus)	January 20, 2017	#ARHGisingVenus	19.7%	#1	#3	21.7%	#2	#5	1090 - l	
91	91	"Sarri in Trouble"	January 23, 2017	#ARHSarriInTrouble	21.9%	#1	#4	20.9%	#2	—N/a	1092 - n	
92	92	"Rebelasyon ni Maggie" (Revelation of Maggie)	January 24, 2017	#ARHRebelasyonNiMaggie	20.7%	#1	#4	20.0%	#2	#6	1091 - m	
93	93	"Pepe Returns"	January 25, 2017	#ARHPepeReturns	19.6%	#1	#4	19.7%	#2	—N/a	1093 - o	
94	94	"Malaking Pasabog" (Big exposé)	January 26, 2017	#ARHMalakingPasabog	20.8%	#1	#4	20.1%	#2	—N/a	1095 - q	
95	95	"Disguise"	January 27, 2017	#ARHDisguise	20.6%	#1	#4	20.3%	#2	#6	1094 - p	
96	96	"True Colors"	January 30, 2017	#ARHTrueColors	20.6%	#1	#5	20.5%	#2	#7	1096 - r	
97	97	"Judy versus Maggie"	January 31, 2017	#ARHJudyVsMaggie	22.1%	#1	#4	22.0%	#2	—N/a	1097 - s	
Average					21.2%			20.1%				

==== February 2017 ====
No. overall	No. in season	Episode	Original air date	Social media hashtag	AGB Nielsen NUTAM			Kantar Media Nationwide			ProdCode	Ref.
No. overall	No. in season	Episode	Original air date	Social media hashtag	Rating	Timeslot rank	Whole day rank	Rating	Timeslot rank	Whole day rank	ProdCode	Ref.
98	98	"Saving Judy"	February 1, 2017	#ARHSavingJudy	21.3%	#1	#4	20.7%	#2	—N/a	1098 - t	
99	99	"Buwis Buhay" (Death defying)	February 2, 2017	#ARHBuwisBuhay	21.9%	#1	#3	22.2%	#2	—N/a	1100 - v	
100	100	"Sorry Sarri"	February 3, 2017	#ARHSorrySarri	22.0%	#1	#3	20.3%	#2	#6	1099 - u	
101	101	"Hostage"	February 6, 2017	#ARHHostage	20.9%	#1	#4	21.2%	#2	—N/a	1101 - w	
102	102	"Venus in Action"	February 7, 2017	#ARHVenusInAction	19.9%	#1	#4	20.9%	#2	—N/a	1104 - z	
103	103	"Maggie versus Dean"	February 8, 2017	#ARHMaggieVsDean	19.8%	#1	#4	20.1%	#2	—N/a	1102 - x	
104	104	"Pagsuko" (Surrender)	February 9, 2017	#ARHPagsuko	18.3%	#1	#5	19.4%	#2	—N/a	1103 - y	
105	105	"Justice Prevails"	February 10, 2017	#ARHJusticePrevails	20.8%	#1	#4	21.3%	#2	#7	1105 - aa	
106	106	"Free Again"	February 13, 2017	#ARHFreeAgain	20.2%	#1	#3	21.2%	#2	—N/a	1107 - cc	
107	107	"Innocent and Free"	February 14, 2017	#ARHInnocentAndFree	19.2%	#1	#4	18.7%	#2	—N/a	1106 - bb	
108	108	"Buwelta ni Dean" (Rebound of Dean)	February 15, 2017	#ARHBuweltaNiDean	17.4%	#1	#5	17.9%	#2	#7	1108 - dd	
109	109	"Huling Alas" (Final ace)	February 16, 2017	#ARHHulingAlas	19.0%	#1	#5	21.0%	#2	—N/a	1109 - ee	
110	110	"Panibagong Hamon" (New challenge)	February 17, 2017	#ARHPanibagongHamon	18.2%	#1	#5	18.8%	#2	#7	1110 - ff	
111	111	"Letting Go"	February 20, 2017	#ARHLettingGo	20.1%	#1	#5	20.9%	#2	#6	1111 - gg	
112	112	"Panic Mode"	February 21, 2017	#ARHPanicMode	19.3%	#1	#4	19.6%	#2	#6	1112 - hh	
113	113	"Kabaliwan ni Dean" (Craziness of Dean)	February 22, 2017	#ARHKabaliwanNiDean	22.6%	#1	#3	22.0%	#2	—N/a	1115 - kk	
114	114	"Walang Urungan" (Nothing left)	February 23, 2017	#ARHWalangUrungan	22.2%	#1	#3	22.1%	#2	—N/a	1114 - jj	
115	115	"Pagwawakas" (Finale)	February 24, 2017	#ARHPagwawakas	21.3%	#1	#3	22.5%	#2	#5	1116 - ll	
Average					20.2%			20.6%				

=== Season 2 (2017) ===
==== August 2017 ====
No. overall	No. in season	Episode	Original air date	Social media hashtag	AGB Nielsen NUTAM People			Kantar Media Nationwide			Ref.
No. overall	No. in season	Episode	Original air date	Social media hashtag	Rating	Timeslot rank	Whole day rank	Rating	Timeslot rank	Whole day rank	Ref.
116	1	"Season 2 Premiere"	August 14, 2017	#AlyasRobinHood	10.7%	#2	#2	18.9%	#2	#6	
117	2	"Unang Misyon" (First mission)	August 15, 2017	#ARHUnangMisyon	10.4%	#2	#3	16.9%	#2	#9	
118	3	"Panganib" (Danger)	August 16, 2017	#ARHPanganib	9.6%	#2	#3	17.5%	#2	#8	
119	4	"Hostage"	August 17, 2017	#ARHHostage	9.6%	#2	#4	17.8%	#2	#7	
120	5	"Sino si Emilio" (Who is Emilio)	August 18, 2017	#ARHSinoSiEmilio	9.4%	#2	#4	17.0%	#2	#7	
121	6	"Paghihinagpis" (Distress)	August 21, 2017	#ARHPaghihinagpis	10.0%	#2	#5	18.1%	#2	#8	
122	7	"Sabwatan" (Complice)	August 22, 2017	#ARHSabwatan	10.0%	#2	#5	17.5%	#2	#10	
123	8	"Ganti ni Pablo" (Revenge of Pablo)	August 23, 2017	#ARHGantiNiPablo	9.6%	#2	#5	16.7%	#2	#9	
124	9	"Pagtakas" (Escape)	August 24, 2017	#ARHPagtakas	9.0%	#2	#5	16.0%	#2	#11	
125	10	"Hamon Kay Pepe" (Challenge for Pepe)	August 25, 2017	#ARHHamonKayPepe	9.8%	#2	#5	17.4%	#2	#10	
126	11	"Bagong Hamon" (New Challenge)	August 28, 2017	#ARHBagongHamon	8.9%	#2	#5	16.1%	#2	#11	
127	12	"Ang Paghaharap" (The Confrontation)	August 29, 2017	#ARHAngPaghaharap	9.9%	#2	#5	18.4%	#2	#8	
128	13	"Buhay si Judy" (Judy is Alive)	August 30, 2017	#ARHBuhaySiJudy	8.9%	#2	#5	17.3%	#2	#9	
129	14	"Diskarteng Venus" (Strategy of Venus)	August 31, 2017	#ARHDiskartengVenus	9.3%	#2	#4	18.0%	#2	#8	
Average					9.7%			17.4%			

==== September 2017 ====
No. overall	No. in season	Episode	Original air date	Social media hashtag	AGB Nielsen NUTAM People			Kantar Media Nationwide			Ref.
No. overall	No. in season	Episode	Original air date	Social media hashtag	Rating	Timeslot rank	Whole day rank	Rating	Timeslot rank	Whole day rank	Ref.
130	15	"Kutob ni Pepe" (Hunch of Pepe)	September 1, 2017	#ARHKutobNiPepe	9.0%	#2	#5	18.0%	#2	#9	
131	16	"Sino si Andres" (Who is Andres)	September 4, 2017	#ARHSinoSiAndres	8.5%	#2	#5	17.6%	#2	#8	
132	17	"Herederang Iris" (Heiress Iris)	September 5, 2017	#ARHHerederangIris	9.2%	#2	#5	18.4%	#2	#7	
133	18	"Pepe at Iris" (Pepe and Iris)	September 6, 2017	#ARHPepeAtIris	8.7%	#2	#5	18.0%	#2	#8	
134	19	"Muling Pagkikita" (The reunion)	September 7, 2017	#ARHMulingPagkikita	8.9%	#2	#5	17.4%	#2	#8	
135	20	"The Search"	September 8, 2017	#ARHTheSearch	9.0%	#2	#3	15.3%	#2	#12	
136	21	"Desperado" (Desperate)	September 11, 2017	#ARHDesperado	9.7%	#2	#5	16.9%	#2	#11	
137	22	"Yoyo Boy"	September 12, 2017	#ARHYoyoBoy	10.3%	#2	#4	18.5%	#2	#10	
138	23	"The Bodyguard"	September 13, 2017	#ARHTheBodyguard	9.6%	#2	#5	18.0%	#2	#9	
139	24	"Venus at Iris" (Venus and Iris)	September 14, 2017	#ARHVenusAtIris	9.6%	#2	#5	17.8%	#2	#8	
140	25	"Muling Pagkikita" (The reunion)	September 15, 2017	#ARHMulingPagkikita	8.9%	#2	#5	17.0%	#2	#9	
141	26	"Engkwentro" (Encounter)	September 18, 2017	#ARHEngkwentro	7.8%	#2	#6	14.9%	#2	#14	
142	27	"Bagong Judy" (New Judy)	September 19, 2017	#ARHBagongJudy	—N/a			14.2%	#2	#16	
143	28	"Duda ni Iris" (Doubt of Iris)	September 20, 2017	#ARHDudaNiIris	—N/a			14.5%	#2	#13	
144	29	"Hazing"	September 21, 2017	#ARHHazing	7.8%	#2	#7	13.6%	#2	#16	
145	30	"Kapatiran" (Brotherhood)	September 22, 2017	#ARHKapatiran	8.6%	#2	#7	14.7%	#2	#13	
146	31	"Hanapan" (Search)	September 25, 2017	#ARHHanapan	8.7%	#2	#6	14.5%	#2	#15	
147	32	"Pagtatagpo" (Coming together)	September 26, 2017	#ARHPagtatagpo	8.7%	#2	#6	15.6%	#2	#12	
148	33	"Selosan Blues" (Jealousy Blues)	September 27, 2017	#ARHSelosanBlues	8.5%	#2	#6	14.7%	#2	#12	
149	34	"Walang Kawala" (No Escape)	September 28, 2017	#ARHWalangKawala	7.8%	#2	#7	14.6%	#2	#14	
150	35	"Buwis Buhay" (Death-defying)	September 29, 2017	#ARHBuwisBuhay	8.2%	#2	#6	15.5%	#2	#13	
Average					8.8%			16.2%			

==== October 2017 ====
No. overall	No. in season	Episode	Original air date	Social media hashtag	AGB Nielsen NUTAM People			Kantar Media Nationwide			Ref.
No. overall	No. in season	Episode	Original air date	Social media hashtag	Rating	Timeslot rank	Whole day rank	Rating	Timeslot rank	Whole day rank	Ref.
151	36	"Bagong Biktima" (New victim)	October 2, 2017	#ARHBagongBiktima	8.2%	#2	#6	14.2%	#2	#14	
152	37	"Laban Pepe" (Fight Pepe)	October 3, 2017	#ARHLabanPepe	8.1%	#2	#7	14.8%	#2	#13	
153	38	"Pakikiramay" (Sympathy)	October 4, 2017	#ARHPakikiramay	8.0%	#2	#6	14.5%	#2	#13	
154	39	"Pagluluksa" (Mourning)	October 5, 2017	#ARHPagluluksa	7.9%	#2	#7	13.8%	#2	#15	
155	40	"Pagsuko" (Surrender)	October 6, 2017	#ARHPagsuko	6.8%	#2	#8	13.8%	#2	#15	
156	41	"Bagong Salta" (Newbie)	October 9, 2017	#ARHBagongSalta	9.5%	#2	#7	15.2%	#2	#16	
157	42	"Tagapagtanggol" (Protector)	October 10, 2017	#ARHTagapagtanggol	8.7%	#2	#6	17.0%	#2	#10	
158	43	"Paninindigan" (Affirmation)	October 11, 2017	#ARHPaninindigan	8.8%	#2	#6	16.2%	#2	#12	
159	44	"Tuloy Ang Laban" (Fight continues)	October 12, 2017	#ARHTuloyAngLaban	9.2%	#2	#6	16.2%	#2	#12	
160	45	"Hustisya" (Justice)	October 13, 2017	#ARHHustisya	9.5%	#2	#6	15.4%	#2	#14	
161	46	"Matira Matibay" (Survival of the fittest)	October 16, 2017	#ARHMatiraMatibay	8.9%	#2	#5	14.4%	#2	#14	
162	47	"Pasasalamat" (Thanks)	October 17, 2017	#ARHPasasalamat	9.1%	#2	#5	15.2%	#2	#15	
163	48	"Gate Crashers"	October 18, 2017	#ARHGateCrashers	8.1%	#2	#6	14.6%	#2	#14	
164	49	"Batas ni Pepe" (Law of Pepe)	October 19, 2017	#ARHBatasNiPepe	8.9%	#2	#6	15.4%	#2	#16	
165	50	"Beast Mode"	October 20, 2017	#ARHBeastMode	7.7%	#2	#8	13.7%	#2	#16	
166	51	"Pepe at Judy" (Pepe and Judy)	October 23, 2017	#ARHPepeAtJudy	9.2%	#2	#6	14.7%	#2	#15	
167	52	"Ang Paghaharap" (The Confrontation)	October 24, 2017	#ARHAngPaghaharap	9.0%	#2	#6	15.5%	#2	#14	
168	53	"Pepe's Squad"	October 25, 2017	#ARHPepesSquad	7.6%	#2	#8	14.9%	#2	#14	
169	54	"Huli sa Akto" (Caught in the act)	October 26, 2017	#ARHHuliSaAkto	9.9%	#2	#5	15.7%	#2	#14	
170	55	"False Lead"	October 27, 2017	#ARHFalseLead	8.1%	#2	#6	14.4%	#2	#13	
171	56	"Big Revelation"	October 30, 2017	#ARHBigRevelation	8.7%	#2	#6	15.0%	#2	#15	
172	57	"Alyas Robin Hood is Pepe De Jesus"	October 31, 2017	#ARHisPepeDeJesus	8.9%	#2	#6	16.2%	#2	#13	
Average					8.6%			15.0%			

==== November 2017 ====
No. overall	No. in season	Episode	Original air date	Social media hashtag	AGB Nielsen NUTAM People			Kantar Media Nationwide			Ref.
No. overall	No. in season	Episode	Original air date	Social media hashtag	Rating	Timeslot rank	Whole day rank	Rating	Timeslot rank	Whole day rank	Ref.
173	58	"Lupit ni Pepe" (Harsh of Pepe)	November 1, 2017	#ARHLupitNiPepe	7.7%	#2	#8	14.5%	#2	#13	
174	59	"Walang Iwanan" (Without Leave)	November 2, 2017	#ARHWalangIwanan	9.5%	#2	#6	16.4%	#2	#12	
175	60	"Operation Submarine"	November 3, 2017	#ARHOperationSubmarine	9.5%	#2	#6	16.5%	#2	#11	
176	61	"Tunay Na Ama" (Real Father)	November 6, 2017	#ARHTunayNaAma	9.5%	#2	#7	16.7%	#2	#11	
177	62	"The Chase"	November 7, 2017	#ARHTheChase	9.8%	#2	#6	15.7%	#2	#14	
178	63	"Do Or Die"	November 8, 2017	#ARHDoOrDie	8.9%	#2	#6	16.9%	#2	#10	
179	64	"Wanted"	November 9, 2017	#ARHWanted	9.1%	#2	#6	15.3%	#2	#13	
180	65	"Tunay Na Kulay" (Real Color)	November 10, 2017	#ARHTunayNaKulay	9.0%	#2	#6	15.8%	#2	#11	
181	66	"Pepe vs. Emilio"	November 13, 2017	#ARHPepeVsEmilio	9.8%	#2	#7	14.8%	#2	#11	
182	67	"Fake Death"	November 14, 2017	#ARHFakeDeath	9.0%	#2	#6	15.3%	#2	#12	
183	68	"The Truth"	November 15, 2017	#ARHTheTruth	9.1%	#2	#6	15.3%	#2	#11	
184	69	"Big Reveal"	November 16, 2017	#ARHBigReveal	8.2%	#2	#6	14.7%	#2	#15	
185	70	"Matinding Hamon" (Extreme Challenge)	November 17, 2017	#ARHMatindingHamon	8.9%	#2	#5	14.7%	#2	#12	
186	71	"Full Force"	November 20, 2017	#ARHFullForce	9.2%	#2	#5	15.1%	#2	#12	
187	72	"Pagsugod" (Assault)	November 21, 2017	#ARHPagsugod	9.0%	#2	#6	15.4%	#2	#11	
188	73	"No Turning Back"	November 22, 2017	#ARHNoTurningBack	8.3%	#2	#6	16.2%	#2	#10	
189	74	"Fight For Life"	November 23, 2017	#ARHFightForLife	8.8%	#2	#5	17.2%	#2	#11	
190	75	"Ang Pagtatapos" (The End)	November 24, 2017	#ARHAngPagtatapos	9.7%	#2	#4	15.3%	#2	#13	
Average					9.0%			15.7%			
