= Alex & Amie =

2019 Philippine television comedy series

- Title card
- Genre: Comedy
- Created by: Marjorie Dumont
- Written by: Jeffrey John Imutan; Jerome Zamora; Maria Danzen Santos; Michael Joseph Robert Vergara; Roel Raval; Eljay Castro Deldoc
- Directed by: Mhyk Vergara; Michael Christian Cardoz
- Creative director: Roy C. Iglesias
- Starring: Mikael Daez; Max Collins; Caprice Cayetano
- Country of origin: Philippines
- Original language: Tagalog
- No. of episodes: 10

Production
- Executive producers: Kristian Julao; Brian Geli
- Production location: Philippines
- Cinematography: Patrick Ferrer; Joseph delos Reyes
- Camera setup: Multiple-camera setup
- Running time: 12–15 minutes
- Production company: GMA News and Public Affairs

Original release
- Network: GMA Network
- Release: May 20 – May 31, 2019

Alex & Amie is a 2019 Philippine television comedy series broadcast by GMA Network. Directed by Mhyk Vergara and Michael Christian Cardoz, it stars Mikael Daez and Caprice Cayetano in the title role. It premiered on May 20, 2019 on the network's morning line up. The series concluded on May 31, 2019, with a total of 10 episodes.

The series is streaming online on YouTube.

== Cast and characters ==
Cast

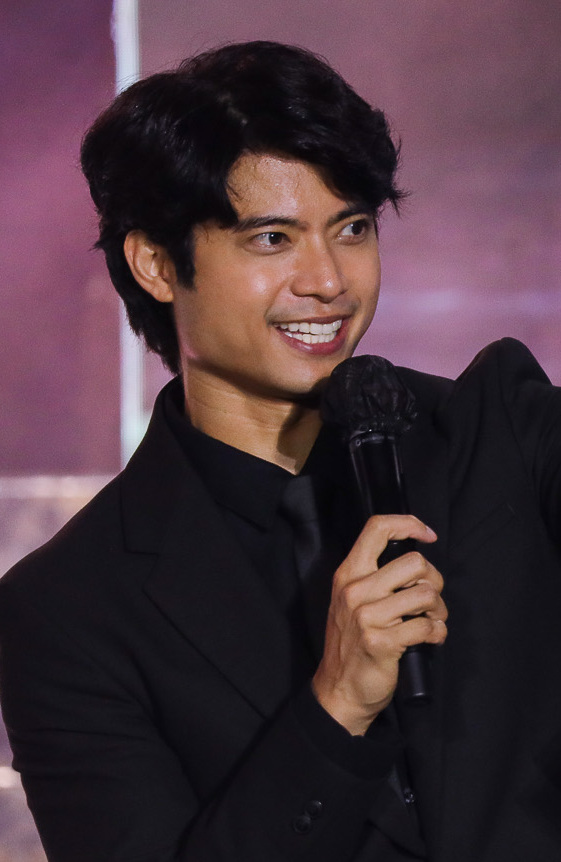
Mikael Daez

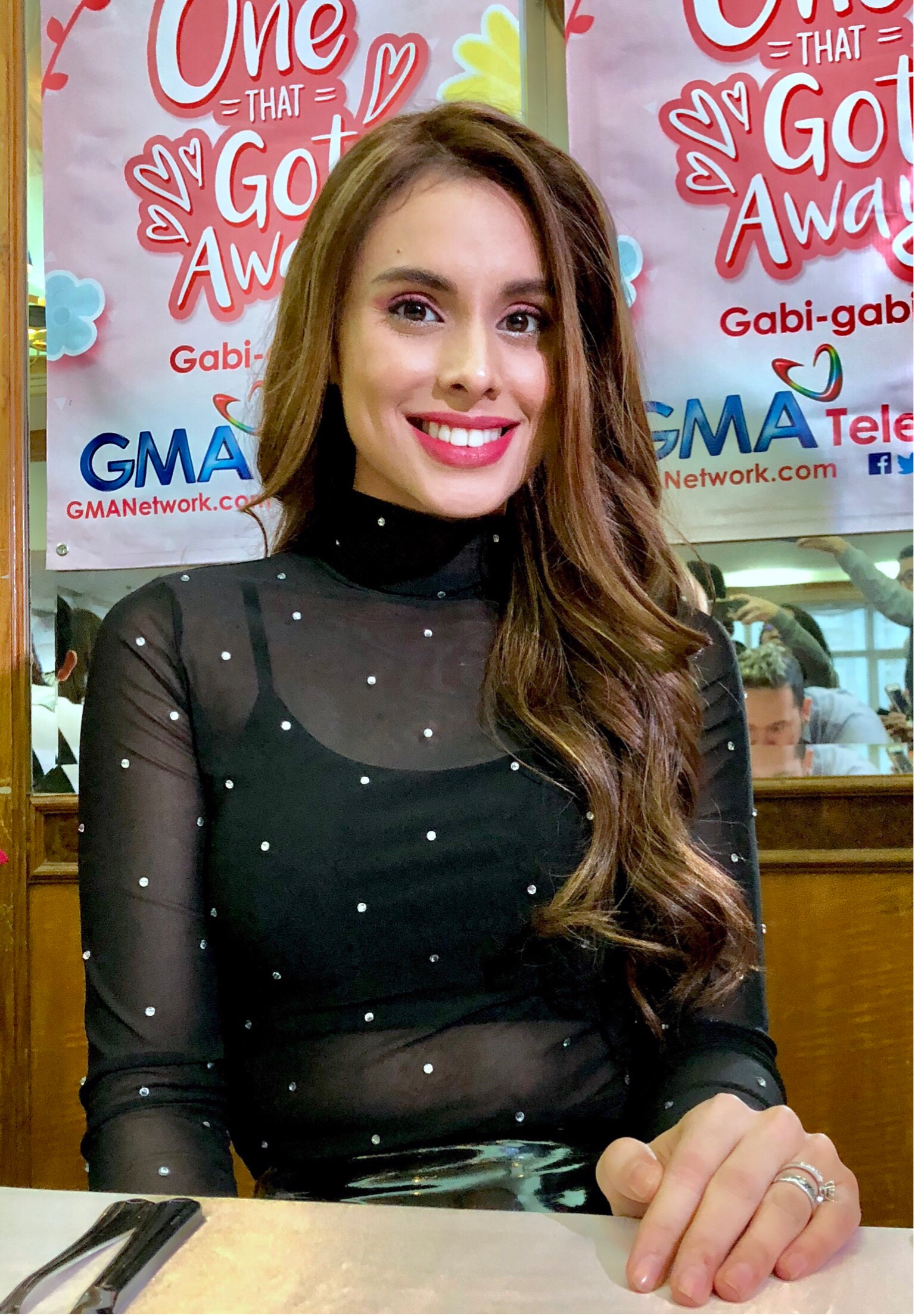
Max Collins

Lead cast

- Mikael Daez as Alexander "Alex" Sablay
- Max Collins as Bing Lopez
- Caprice Cayetano as the voice of Amie

Supporting cast

- Dominic Roco as Patrick Santos
- Dexter Doria as Carmela "Mel" Ronquillo-Diaz
- Leanne Bautista as Tiny Mendoza
- Maey Bautista as Rita Reyes
- Katrina Mae Columna as Beyoncé Bautista
- Kenken Nuyad as Mikey Abeza
- Seth dela Cruz as Dylar Licayco
- JM Ventenilla as Peter Reyes
- Raki Diga as the voice of Panchito, Balut and Kapitan Dilim

Guest cast

- David Remo as younger Alex
