= Cruz vs Cruz =

Philippine television drama series

- Title card
- Genre: Drama
- Directed by: Gil Tejada
- Starring: Vina Morales; Gladys Reyes; Neil Ryan Sese; Kristoffer Martin; Lexi Gonzales; Elijah Alejo; Caprice Cayetano
- Theme music composer: Rina May Mercado
- Opening theme: "Kung Mababalik" by Vina Morales
- Country of origin: Philippines
- Original language: Tagalog
- No. of episodes: 138

Production
- Running time: 22–29 minutes
- Production company: GMA Entertainment Group

Original release
- Network: GMA Network
- Release: July 21, 2025 – January 17, 2026

Cruz vs Cruz is a Philippine television drama series broadcast by GMA Network. Directed by Gil Tejada, it stars Vina Morales, Gladys Reyes, Neil Ryan Sese, Kristoffer Martin, Lexi Gonzales, Elijah Alejo and Caprice Cayetano. It premiered on July 21, 2025 on the network's Afternoon Prime line up. The series concluded on January 17, 2026, with a total of 138 episodes.

The series is streaming online on YouTube.

== Premise ==
Manuel's family starts to be broken apart, when he commits an adultery while working overseas.

== Cast and characters ==
Cast

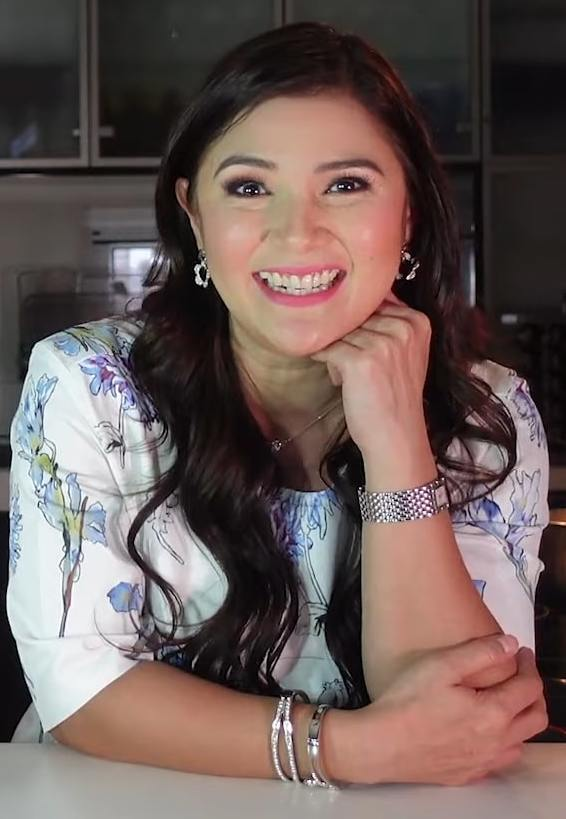
Vina Morales

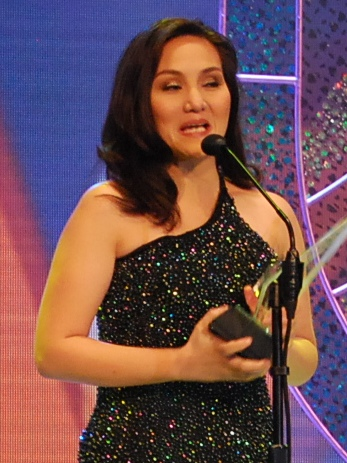
Gladys Reyes

Lead cast

- Vina Morales as Felma Cruz
- Gladys Reyes as Hazel Cruz
- Neil Ryan Sese as Manuel Cruz
- Kristoffer Martin as Jeff Cruz
- Lexi Gonzales as Andrea Cruz
- Elijah Alejo as Coleen Cruz
- Caprice Cayetano as Jessica Cruz

Supporting cast

- Pancho Magno
- Gilleth Sandico
- Gary Estrada

Guest cast

- Cassy Lavarias

== Development ==
The series was announced by GMA Network in January 2025. On January 17, 2025, Gil Tejada was announced as the director, alongside cast members including Vina Morales, Neil Ryan Sese, Lexi Gonzales, Kristoffer Martin, Pancho Magno, Cassy Lavarias, Gilleth Sandico, Caprice Cayetano and Elijah Alejo.

== Production ==
Principal photography commenced on February 14, 2025.

== Reception ==
=== Ratings ===
According to AGB Nielsen Philippines' Nationwide Urban Television Audience Measurement People in television homes, the pilot episode of Cruz vs Cruz earned a 7.5% rating. The final episode scored a 5.6% rating.

=== Critical response ===
Boy Abunda of The Philippine Star complimented the performances of actors Neil Ryan Sese and Pancho Magno, stating both actors "gave sincerity and depth" in their respective roles.
