= Alyas Robin Hood =

Philippine television drama series

- Season 2 title card
- Also known as: Bow of Justice; Bow of Justice 2
- Genre: Action drama; Crime
- Created by: Suzette Doctolero
- Written by: Suzette Doctolero; Aloy Adlawan; Glaiza Ramirez; Jake Somera; Liberty Trinidad; Patrick Ilagan; Erwin Caesar Bravo
- Directed by: Dominic Zapata; Lore Reyes; Joyce Bernal
- Creative director: Roy C. Iglesias
- Starring: Dingdong Dantes
- Theme music composer: John Meer Vera Perez
- Opening theme: "Sa Piling Mo" by Kristoffer Martin
- Country of origin: Philippines
- Original language: Tagalog
- No. of seasons: 2
- No. of episodes: 190 (list of episodes)

Production
- Executive producer: Nieva M. Sabit
- Producer: Shielyn Atienza
- Production locations: Quezon City, Philippines
- Cinematography: Mar Matias; Roman Theodossis
- Editors: Paolo Mendoza; Gervio Estella; Lawrence Villena
- Camera setup: Multiple-camera setup
- Running time: 25–41 minutes
- Production company: GMA Entertainment TV

Original release
- Network: GMA Network
- Release: September 19, 2016 – November 24, 2017

Alyas Robin Hood (transl. alias Robin Hood / international title: Bow of Justice / Bow of Justice 2) is a Philippine television drama action crime series broadcast by GMA Network. The series was inspired by the English folk hero, Robin Hood. Directed by Dominic Zapata, it stars Dingdong Dantes in the title role. It premiered on September 19, 2016 on the network's Telebabad line up. The series concluded on November 24, 2017, with a total of two seasons and 190 episodes.

The series is streaming online on YouTube.

== Premise ==
In season 1, Pepe's father is murdered by Dean Balbuena who gets Pepe framed up for the murder. Arrested and later fleeing, Pepe goes out to be "Alyas Robin Hood". Pepe sets to find justice and seeks for the truth to prove himself not guilty for his charges.

In season 2, Pepe is now a lawyer and also engaged to Venus. Their relationship faces a setback due to an accident that involves Pepe's mother. Leading to a new enemy and problems, Alyas Robin Hood makes a comeback.

== Episodes ==
Season	Episodes	Originally released	
Season	Episodes	First released	Last released
1	115	September 19, 2016	February 24, 2017
2	75	August 14, 2017	November 24, 2017

== Cast and characters ==
Cast

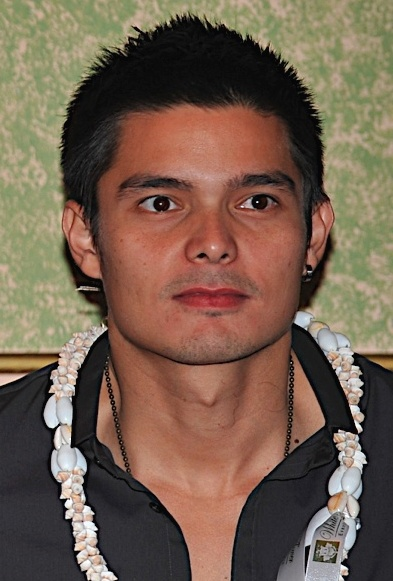
Dingdong Dantes

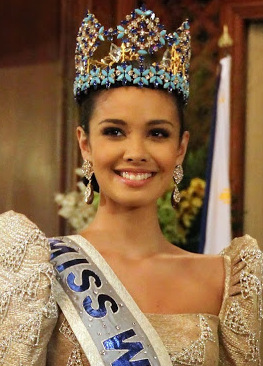
Megan Young

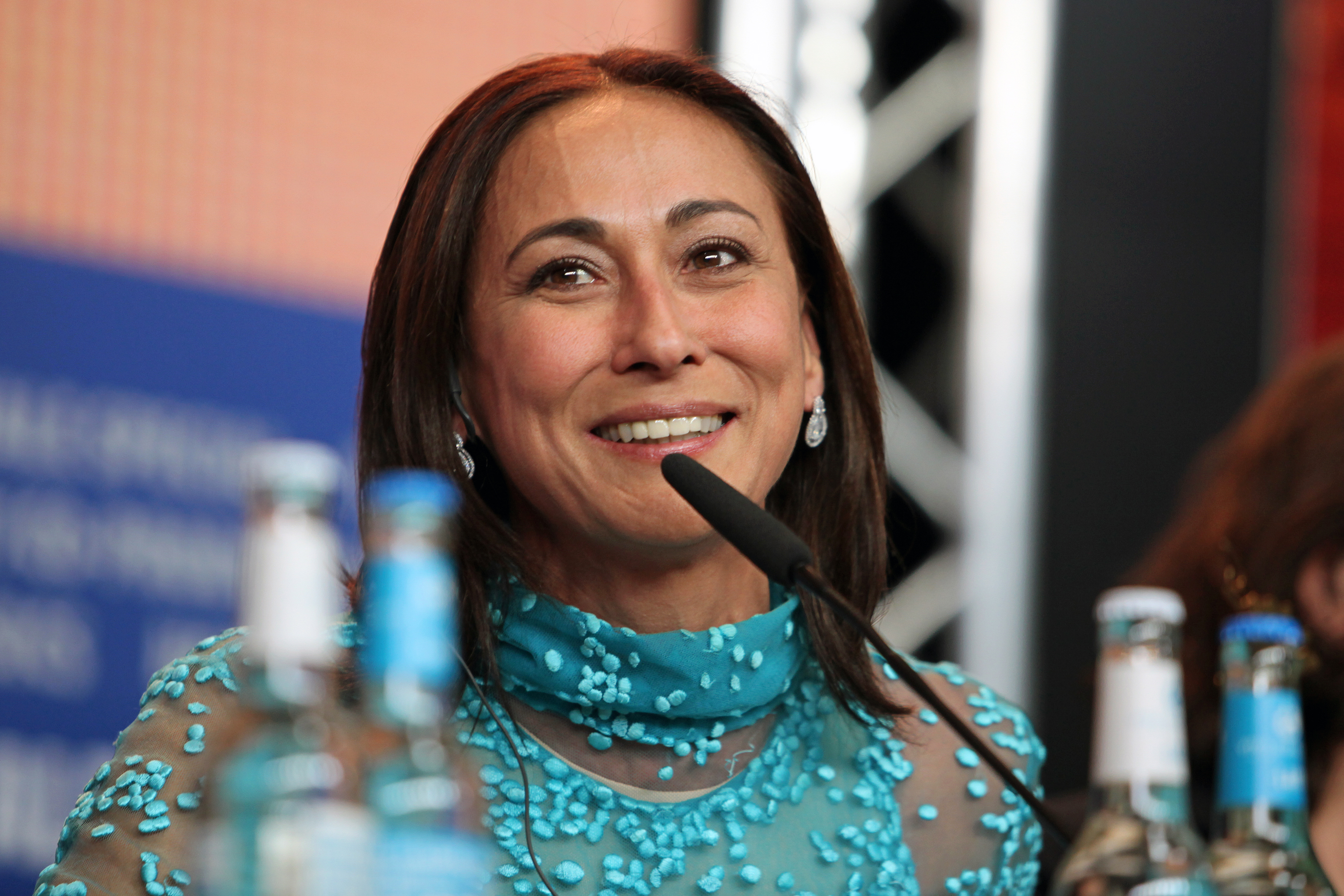
Cherie Gil

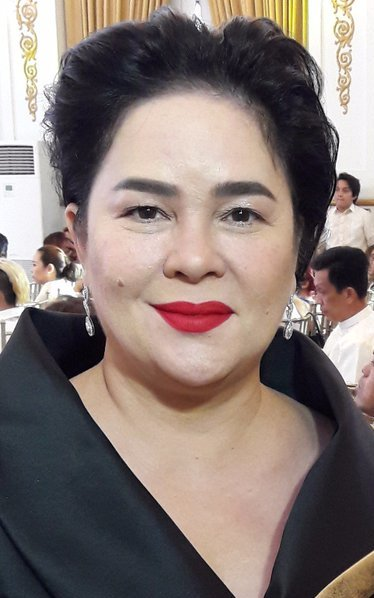
Jaclyn Jose

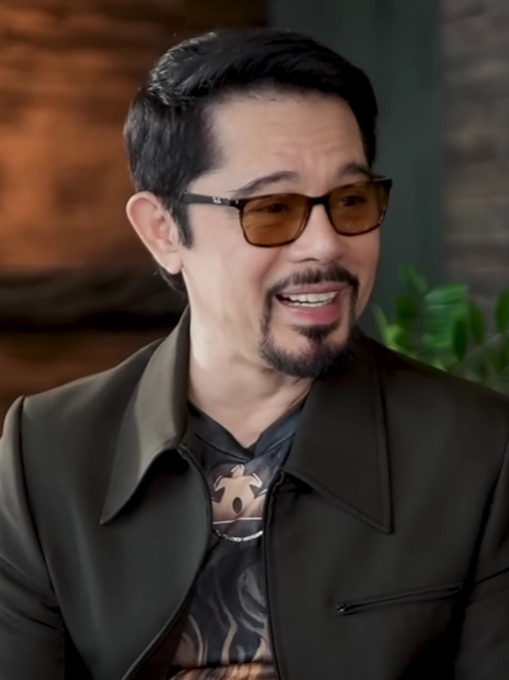
Christopher de Leon

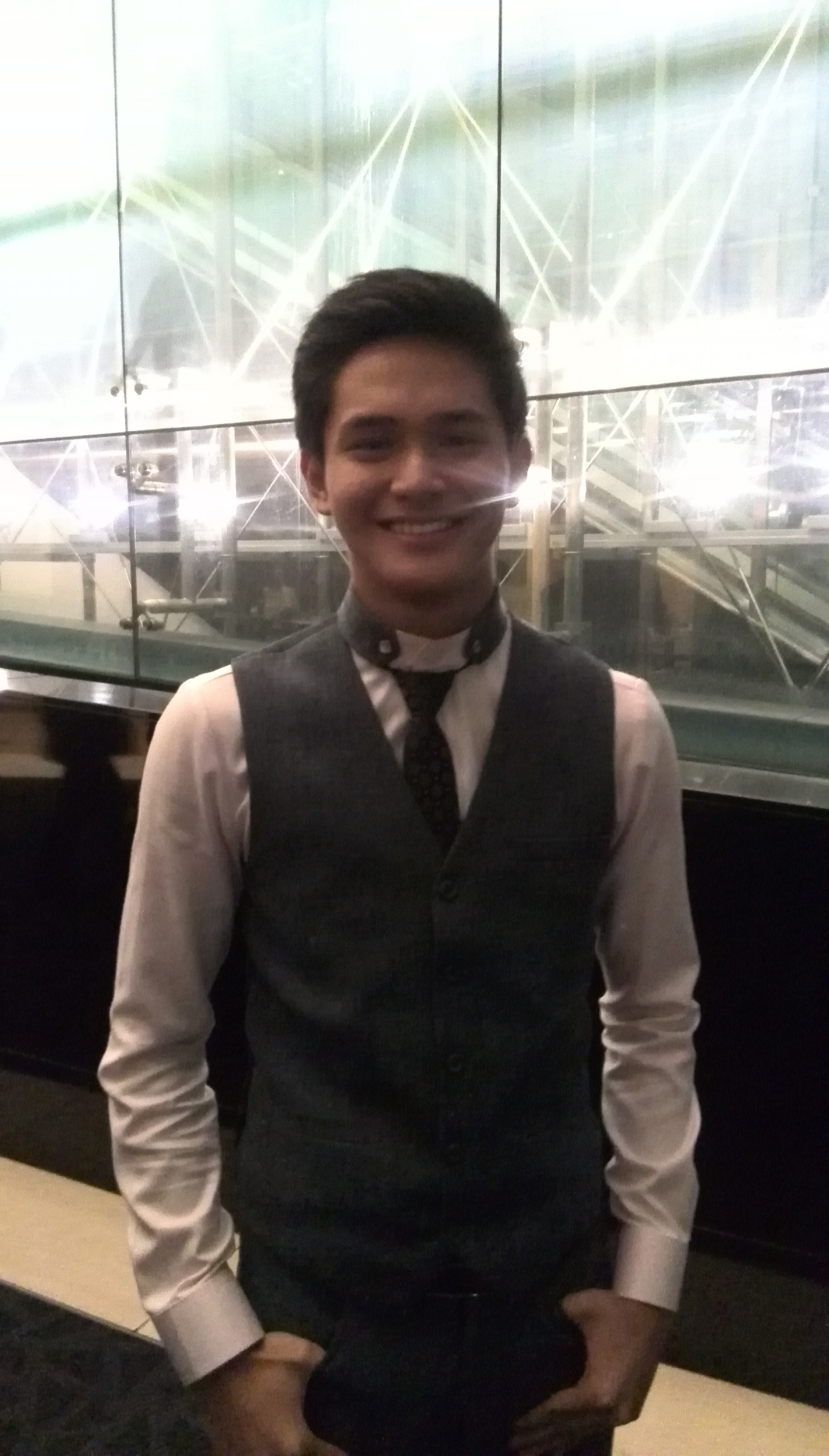
Ruru Madrid

Lead cast

- Dingdong Dantes as Jose Paulo "Pepe" de Jesus Jr. / Alyas Robin Hood

Supporting cast

- Andrea Torres as Venus Torralba-de Jesus
- Megan Young as Sarri Acosta (season 1)
- Cherie Gil as Margarita "Maggie" Balbuena (season 1)
- Sid Lucero as Dean Balbuena (season 1)
- Jaclyn Jose as Judy de Jesus
- Christopher de Leon as Jose Paulo de Jesus (season 1)
- Paolo Contis as Daniel Acosta
- Gary Estrada as Carlos "Caloy" de Jesus
- Dennis Padilla as Wilson Chan
- John Feir as Armando
- Gio Alvarez as Jericho "Jekjek" Sumilang
- Lindsay de Vera as Felizidad "Lizzy" de Jesus
- Dave Bornea as Julian Balbuena
- Caprice Cayetano as Ekay
- Rey "PJ" Abellana as Leandro Torralba
- Antonette Garcia as Frida
- Luri Vincent Nalus as Junior "Jun Jun" Aguilar
- Ruru Madrid as Andres Silang (season 2)
- Solenn Heussaff as Iris Rebecca Lizeralde (season 2)
- Edu Manzano as Emilio Albano (season 2)
- Jay Manalo as Pablo Rodrigo (season 2)
- KC Montero as Rigor (season 2)

== Production ==
Principal photography for the second season commenced on July 20, 2017.

== Ratings ==
According to AGB Nielsen Philippines' Mega Manila household television ratings, the series premiere of Alyas Robin Hood earned a 21.3% rating. The first season had its highest rating on November 10, 2016 with a 26.2% rating. From AGB Nielsen Nationwide Urban Television Audience Measurement, the series had its highest rating on December 7, 2016 with a 23.3% rating. The season one's finale scored a 21.3% rating.

According to AGB Nielsen Philippines' Nationwide Urban Television Audience Measurement People in television homes, the premiere of Alyas Robin Hood's second season earned a 10.7% rating. The final episode scored a 9.7% rating.

== Accolades ==
Accolades received by Alyas Robin Hood
Year	Award	Category	Recipient	Result	Ref.
2017	31st PMPC Star Awards for Television	Best Primetime Drama Series	Alyas Robin Hood	Won	
2017	31st PMPC Star Awards for Television	Best Drama Actor	Dingdong Dantes	Won	
2017	31st PMPC Star Awards for Television	Best New Male TV Personality	Dave Bornea	Nominated	
