= Leanne Bautista =

Filipina actress (born 2010)

Leanne Amber Bautista
- Born: October 14, 2010 (age 15); Tarlac, Philippines
- Occupation: Child actress
- Years active: 2015–present
- Agent: GMA Artist Center (2016–present)

Leanne Amber Rafol Bautista (born October 14, 2010) is a Filipina child actress. She is best known as Kat Kat from the 2016 Filipino television series Juan Happy Love Story.

== Career ==
Bautista began her show business career in 2015 at the age of four when she appeared in a commercial for SkyBroadband. She made her acting debut as Kat Kat, the adopted daughter of Dennis Trillo and Heart Evangelista, in the 2016 television series Juan Happy Love Story.

== Filmography ==
List of film appearances, with year, title, and role shown
Television
Year	Title	Role
2016	Juan Happy Love Story	Katrina Cassandra "Katkat" Dela Costa-Arboleda
2016	Magpakailanman: Crime of Passion	Badet
2016	Wagas: Super Police Man and Super Firewoman	Gianne
2016	Pinulot Ka Lang sa Lupa	Glenda
2016	Hahamakin Ang Lahat	young Rachel Ke
2016	Wish Ko Lang	
2016	Magpakailanman: Finding Earl	Patty
2016	Wagas: Tikbalang Lover	Jessa
2016	Alyas Robin Hood	Angela
2017	Maynila	
2017	Magpakailanman: The Bilog and Bunak story	Bilog
2017	Karelasyon	
2017	Mulawin vs. Ravena	Young Anya
2017	Tadhana: Dream House	Mimay
2017	Daig Kayo Ng Lola Ko	Gretchen
2017	Ika-6 na Utos	Chelsea Muller
2018	Tadhana: Ang Luho	Madel
2018	Stories for the Soul	Angge
2018	The Cure	Hope Salvador
2019	Hiram na Anak	Duday Sandejo / Duday Alvarez
2019	Alex and Amie	Tiny Mendoza
2019	Wagas	Chloe Liam / Smile Aguilar
2019–21	Aha!	Herself / guest
2019–21	Unang Hirit	Herself / guest
2020–21	Anak ni Waray vs. Anak ni Biday	Young Ginalyn
2023	Abot-Kamay na Pangarap	Precious
