= 2018 in Philippine television =

The following is a list of events affecting Philippine television in 2018. Events listed include television show debuts, finales, cancellations, and channel launches, closures and rebrandings, as well as information about controversies and carriage disputes.

== Events ==
=== January ===
- January 10 – INC TV switched its airing of aspect ratio format quality on the channel feed and its programming to widescreen format (16:9) as being converted its mitigation of reception through free TV and cable and satellite providers after almost 13 years on the usage of broadcast video picture resolution that migrated from fullscreen format (4:3).
- January 15 - ABS-CBN Regional Channel and Tag have ceased broadcasting due to a change in business direction of Creative Programs, Inc. On January 16, Liga began its official broadcast as features the latest and classic sporting events from ABS-CBN Sports. Also as the official broadcaster of 2018 FIFA World Cup. Since the revival of their former channel, Balls ended its broadcast two years of absence and a day absorbed to S+A HD which is now under their simulcast feed. It launched on January 1 under test broadcast.
- January 16 - Net 25 (owned by Eagle Broadcasting Corporation) has switched its airing of aspect ratio format quality on the channel feed and its programming to widescreen format (16:9) as being converted its mitigation of reception through free TV and cable and satellite providers after almost 19 years on the usage of broadcast video picture resolution that migrated from fullscreen format (4:3).
- January 26 - SatLite was launched as a secondary direct-to-home satellite provider by Cignal TV.
- January 31 – After almost 13 years of broadcasting, Filipino-dubbed anime channel Hero has ceased its broadcast operations by the Creative Programs, Inc. due to lack of advertising support and change in business direction immediately after Tag and ABS-CBN Regional Channel also ceased on January 15. Meanwhile, it relaunched as a digital media online portal under ABS-CBN Digital Media on February 7.

=== February ===
- February 1 – Ovation Productions, Inc. launched its subsidiary, "TAP Digital Media Ventures Corporation" (TAP DMV), a private media company that feature some content of programs for entertainment, news and sports, among others which offered world-class across the globe on its owned pay TV channels and over-the-top media service partnered with other broadcasters through agreement rights.
- February 12 – Light Network was renamed back as Light TV with its new slogan "God's Channel of Blessings", after almost 4 years of use and after almost a year since the said channel migrated to digital from analog.
- February 17 – MediaQuest Holdings through TV5 Network, Inc. TV5 unveiled a new logo, a relaunched name as The 5 Network or simply 5, and a slogan or station ID entitled Get It on 5. In contrast, the TV on the northeastern quadrant of the logo has been removed, making it more flexible for the other divisions to incorporate it into their own identity. Along with the rebranding, TV5's programming grid has also divided into five blocks: ESPN 5 (Sports), News5 (News and Information), On 5 (Entertainment, Animation, Japanese anime, Blocktimers and Home Shopping), D5 Studio (Digital Content) and Studio 5 (World-class Filipino productions for audiences across all platforms). In addition, the movie block Movie Max 5 was quickly retired a week before its rebranding and the Saturday night movie block Sine Squad was expanded into a daily strip; with the Saturday night portion was remained Sine Squad Prime on the same day.

=== March ===
- March 27 – Major networks GMA Network Inc. and ABS-CBN Corporation issued a joint statement regarding their differences related to their news reports on the latter's AM radio station DZMM during the Pacquiao-Mosley fight In 2011 based on their news on the former network's live TV broadcast (which is leased their airtime to the network by Solar Entertainment for this fight at that time) with some portions of the latter's news reports containing updates and descriptions of the fight; GMA issued a file an intellectual property violation complaint against ABS-CBN before the Intellectual Property Office. The 2 networks placed their Paid advertisement regarding the statement in the Manila Bulletin on the said date.
- March 28 – ABS-CBN Corporation launched "Star Hunt", a search program for Filipinos who want to appear or participate on any various programming shows such as talent and reality, which produced by ABS-CBN through nationwide and worldwide area auditions, as well as "Star Hunt Academy", a boot camp that giving opportunities for their scouting pool of aspiring rosters especially for the talent members through workshops to include in the network's different platforms beginning on April 20.
- March 31 – After 5 years of broadcasting, Toonami has ceased broadcast in Southeast Asia by Turner Broadcasting System Asia Pacific, Inc., a subsidiary of Warner Bros. Discovery due to the original version of Boomerang ceased to exist.

=== April ===
- April 1–2 – Six ABS-CBN newscasts (Bandila, News Patrol, The Score, Umagang Kay Ganda, TV Patrol and TV Patrol Weekend) switched its broadcast in full high definition after 32 years of broadcasting in standard definition format.
- April 2 – After 18 years and 8 months of broadcast, Lifestyle was renamed to Metro Channel. A relaunch of the female-oriented cable channel from Creative Programs, Inc. and the content provider based on Metro, the Philippines' popular monthly lifestyle magazine from ABS-CBN Publishing and its digital media platform. The channel also launched in full high definition on March 15 during its early test broadcast. Coinciding with this, the channel has switched its airing of aspect ratio format quality on the channel feed and its programming to widescreen format (16:9) as being converted its mitigation of reception through Sky Cable and other cable providers, iWant TV (later rebranded to iWant on November 16), TFC IPTV, and other digital platforms after the usage of broadcast video picture resolution that migrated from fullscreen format (4:3).
- April 12 – Ika-6 na Utos actress Ryza Cenon transferred to ABS-CBN after leaving GMA Network.
- April 18 – People's Television Network has switched its airing of aspect ratio format quality on the channel feed and its programming to high-definition (16:9) as being converted its mitigation of reception through analog and digital signal reception through free TV and other cable and satellite providers after more than 43 years on the usage of broadcast video picture resolution that migrated from standard-definition (4:3).
- April 19 – During the company's annual stockholders meeting, the ABS-CBN board of directors voted in favor and elected Eugenio "Gabby" Lopez III as the chairman Emeritus and his cousin, Chief Technology Officer Martin "Mark" Lopez as his successor as chairman of the network. Gabby Lopez will be the second executive to be elected as chairman Emeritus, succeeded his late father, Eugenio "Geny" Lopez Jr.
- April 29 – Kristel de Catalina, spiral pole dance from Antipolo, Rizal, wins the sixth season of Pilipinas Got Talent, the grand finals of which were held at the Bren Z. Guiao Sports Complex and Convention Center in San Fernando City, Pampanga.
- April 30 – The Department of Tourism received their P 60,000,000 ad placement given to government-owned People's Television Network for airing it on Ben Tulfo's program Kilos Pronto produced by Bitag Media Unilimted, Inc. (in which the blocktimer sells its production time to the network); the contract was not supported with proper documents such as the Memorandum of Agreement and Certificate of Performance contrary to Section 4 of Presidential Decree 1445 and COA Circular No. 2012-001. An investigation on the alleged advertisement anomaly is being conducted by Malacanang, Tourism secretary Wanda Tulfo Teo said that Ben along with his brother Erwin Tulfo returned its P 60 million ad placement from DOT to prove there was no anomaly in the advertisement deal and there was no conflict on the deal because it was a government-to-government deal between the DOT and PTV. Teo was later resigned on May 8 because of the controversy.

=== May ===
- May 1 - Cignal TV launched a video-on-demand and linear programming web platform, Cignal Play that carried some movies and series, as well as livestream of TV channels that also broadcast on Cignal's line-up.
- May 2
  - The NU Bulldogs wins the UAAP Season 80 men's volleyball championship title after defeating the Ateneo Blue Eagles 2–0 in a best-of-three series. This was their 3rd title since they won their last title in 2014.
  - The DLSU Lady Spikers wins the UAAP Season 80 women's volleyball championship title after defeating the FEU Lady Tamaraws 2–0 in a best-of-three series. This was their 11th championship title as they won their third consecutive title.
- May 4 – Philippine Islands Assassins was crowned as the first-ever The Will to Win grand winner of Wowowin, the grand finals of which were held at Kia Theater (now New Frontier Theater), Quezon City.
- May 25
  - DisneyLife, a streaming service owned by The Walt Disney Company, was launched and became available in the Philippines.
  - Solar Entertainment Corporation formally launched its premium digital terrestrial television brand, Easy TV Home Super Digibox, and began conducting its official test broadcast.
- May 26 – Samm Alvero and Kaye Reyes were named as the new Myx VJs at the end of MYX VJ Search 2018.
- May 27 – After 2 years and 7 months, Bloomberg TV Philippines ceased its broadcast at midnight due to higher license fees.
- May 28 – One News officially launched as a localized news channel in partnership with MVP-owned media properties News5, The Philippine Star, BusinessWorld, Bloomberg TV Philippines and content provider Probe Productions. Bloomberg-produced programs will be still be carried by One News.

=== June ===
- June 2 – Janine Berdin from Lapu-Lapu City proclaimed as It's Showtime's Tawag ng Tanghalan Year 2 Grand Champion. It was held at Aliw Theater, Pasay.
- June 4 – Shop TV has switched its airing of aspect ratio format quality on the channel feed and its programming to widescreen format (16:9) as being converted its mitigation of reception through digital signal reception through free TV and other cable and satellite providers after 15 years on the usage of broadcast video picture resolution that migrated from fullscreen format (4:3).
- June 5
  - After more than 12 years of broadcast, 2nd Avenue on RJTV ceased broadcast at 1:00 AM due to low ratings, programming redundancies and cost-cutting measures along with the end of blocktime agreements with Solar Entertainment Corporation and Rajah Broadcasting Network. Meanwhile, the other provincial cable entities will still carry 2nd Avenue's broadcast, with the airing of marathons of some of the programs until June 30, 2018, at 2:00 AM. Several programs from this channel will be transferred to ETC and Jack TV starting June 6, 2018.
  - RJTV migrated its broadcast signal reception to digital terrestrial transmission from switching off its analog frequency in nationwide areas after 25 years. RJTV is also shutting down its digital transmission temporarily for having its huge plans on digital television. The newly reformatted channel began airing at 12 midnight on major cable operators, with TV Shop Philippines, as its first program to air during the test broadcast on the newly launched channel, followed by re-run of some of the local programs aired on RJTV including Pinoy Wrestling. Coinciding with this, the channel has switched its airing of aspect ratio format quality on the channel feed and its programming to widescreen format (16:9) as being converted its mitigation of reception through digital signal reception through free TV and other cable and satellite providers after more than 25 years on the usage of broadcast video picture resolution that migrated from fullscreen format (4:3).
- June 8 - Cignal TV launched eGG Network on their line-up.
- June 30 - Juliana Parizcova Segovia was hailed as the first ever Miss Q & A on It's Showtime. It was held at the Newport Performing Arts Theater, Resorts World Manila.

=== July ===
- July 4 – Jolly Kids was hailed as Eat Bulaga!'s Pinoy Henyo Kids Grand Champion.
- July 7 – Eat Bulaga! began the countdown to their 40th anniversary celebration that held on July 30, 2019, through EB Version 4.0.
- July 15 – ABS-CBN, GMA Network and The 5 Network aired the boxing match between Manny Pacquiao and Argentinian boxer Lucas Matthysse, billed as the "Fight of Champions" which took place at Axiata Arena in Kuala Lumpur, Malaysia. It will be the first Pacquiao fight to be broadcast in high definition for the former network. The boxing match is also broadcast live on pay-per-view through ABS-CBN's subsidiary company Sky Cable and The 5 Network's sister company Cignal and on radio via GMA's AM radio station DZBB-AM, FM radio station DWLS and its network of AM radio stations; with rebroadcasts on the former's sister network S+A, the latter's cable channel Hyper and Solar Sports (who is formerly aired the Pacquiao fights from 2002 to 2016 and they previously sub-licensed the fights for over-the-air television with ABS-CBN from 2005 to 2006 and GMA from 2007 to 2016). The three networks was have previously involved in the roadblock airing of his match against Floyd Mayweather Jr. billed as "The Fight of the Century", or the "Battle for Greatness" with Solar Entertainment Corporation in May 2015.
- July 21 – Lauren Madelaine Cabuguas (Mini Kim Chiu) hailed as the MiniMe season 3 grand winner on It's Showtime.
- July 30 – ABS-CBN Corporation officially launched its two new additional digital terrestrial television channels on ABS-CBN TV Plus: Asianovela Channel, the country's first all-day Filipino-dubbed Asian drama channel that focused on highly acclaimed drama series from South Korea, Taiwan and China as well as Movie Central, an all-day movie channel that includes a line-up of Hollywood blockbuster movies. Aside from two new channels, three additional existing cable channels: Jeepney TV, Myx and O Shopping, are also included for ongoing free trial basis exclusively for ABS-CBN TV Plus subscribers in selected areas only.

=== August ===
- August 5 – People's Television Network aired a mistake, showed a photo of a People’s Liberation Army Navy Type 054A Jiangkai II-class vessel with the Philippine flag waving in their story on President Rodrigo Duterte's statement on his plan to send a Philippine Navy ship to Libya to help rescue Filipino hostages abducted by terrorists, which is aired on the network's weekend newscast Ulat Bayan anchored by Joseph Parafina and Marita Moaje and on the network's Facebook page. The network removed their Facebook post on August 7 and they apologized “for the inadvertent use of wrong photos” for the story.
- August 13–14 - FPJ's Ang Probinsyano production team was called out online by fans of the spouses Dingdong Dantes and Marian Rivera over the alleged unauthorized usage of the spouses' family pictures. The controversy first began gaining steam when a Twitter fan site dedicated to the spouse' daughter Zia, ZiaDantesFanSite posted a video with the caption “Zia's photo was unethically used by ‘Ang Probinsyano’ in Nov 2017. In last night's episode, [Dingdong and Marian] DongYan's photo was edited and used again by the show. Were the photos of Dingdong, Marian and Zia used [and] edited without permission? Dear Ang Probinsyano, strike two na po kayo ah.” which was quickly shared by other users and from which Dantes possibly gained knowledge of such usage. Dantes' response to the controversy was posted on his Facebook account "Courtesy and fair practice must always be observed especially in an established industry like ours. But whether or not it is done within the entertainment sector, we should always be reminded of the basic etiquette for online photo use and sharing that includes asking permission and/or citing sources. I do hope that this won't happen again to anyone." he wrote. In the same post, Dantes also shared an excerpt of his letter to the production team dated August 11, 2018 which read “I appreciate that you found artistic inspiration from the original photos. Unfortunately, there is the inescapable consequence that legal and moral rights were violated here. And as you may very well be aware of, established industry practice is against such act as it amounts to disrespect. Worst of all, as a father and husband, I cannot help but feel offended and deeply hurt by such actions, which happened not just once, but twice. Basic rules of courtesy in this case dictate that you first secure permission from the photographer and my Family.” On the following day, the production team of FPJ's Ang Probinsyano released a statement apologizing to Dantes and his family. The statement explained that the production team hired a third-party contractor to create the props for the show, of which they were neither aware that the photograph belonged to Dantes nor was it intended to disrespect or offend Dantes and his family. The producers added that they have already launched an investigation "to prevent a similar incident from happening in the future." Alice Dixson, likewise offered her apology to Dantes.
- August 15 - BEAM TV terminated eGG Network on their line-upon its digital subchannel line-up due to the review of the provider's decision. Meanwhile, eGG Network continued to air via Cignal TV.
- August 19 – The TNT Boys (Keifer Sanchez, Mackie Empuerto and Francis Concepcion) of Manila, Philippines (impersonated as Jessie J, Ariana Grande and Nicki Minaj) won as Your Face Sounds Familiar Kids season 2 grand winner.
- August 21 – Diyos at Bayan celebrated its 20th anniversary on Philippine television.

=== September ===
- September 5 – Actor Rayver Cruz transferred from ABS-CBN back to his original station, GMA Network.
- September 24 – Eat Bulaga! introduced their new segment which is a franchise and adaptation of an Israeli series, BOOM! produced by Keshet International.
- September 29 – Mandarhyme from Mandaluyong emerged as the first-ever HypeBest Grand Winner, and they joined Vice Ganda to sing the official theme song of the upcoming film, Fantastica on It's Showtime.
- September 30 – Golden Cañedo of Cebu City was proclaimed as the champion of The Clash.

=== October ===
- October 1 - Net 25 temporarily migrated its broadcast signal reception to digital terrestrial transmission from switching off its analog frequency in nationwide areas after 19 years until April 7, 2022.
- October 16 – After 18 months of carriage disputes, two Solar Entertainment Corporation channels (Basketball TV and NBA Premium TV) were returned to Sky Cable, Sky Direct & Sky On Demand. The announcement comes one day before the official start of the league's 2018–19 season.
- October 17 – Singer and actress Regine Velasquez-Alcasid transferred from GMA Network back to her original station, ABS-CBN.
- October 20 – Team Karylle and Jhong hailed as It's Showtime's ninth anniversary (Magpasikat 2018: And 9... Thank You!) champion.
- October 23 – ABS-CBN celebrated its 65th anniversary of Philippine television.
- October 27 – Shaila Rebortera (from Cebu) was crowned as Miss Millennial Philippines 2018 of noontime show, Eat Bulaga!.
- October 28 - After only 2 weeks into the league's 2018–19 season, Basketball TV and NBA Premium TV were removed again from Sky Cable and Sky Direct.

=== November ===
- November 3 – Santos Family won as the first-ever The Kids' Choice grand winner.
- November 4 – Elsa Droga & Raprap Family won as the first-ever The Kids' Choice: Celebrity Edition grand winner.
- November 11 – "Sa Mga Bituin Na Lang Ibubulong", a song entry composed by Kyle Raphael Borbon and interpreted by JM de Guzman was named as Himig Handog 2018 grand winner held at ABS-CBN. This was aired on "ASAP".
- November 12 – The San Beda Red Lions wins the NCAA Season 94 men's basketball championship title after defeating the LPU Pirates 2–0 in a best-of-three series. This was their 3rd consecutive title.
- November 16 - ABS-CBN's over-the-top content platform service formerly known as "iWant TV" was officially relaunched as IWant, as the latter now emphasizes on adding original content similar to Netflix, starting with Spirits: Reawaken (a reboot version of the original 2004–2005 series), Quezon's Game, and Alamat ng Ano. Glorious and MA are the first two original movies of iWant.
- November 18 – ABS-CBN launches the Christmas song Family is Love, after the variety show ASAP Natin 'To.
- November 30 – ABS-CBN Mobile ceased its mobile network-sharing agreement and services between ABS-CBN Corporation and Globe Telecom. As earlier on the third quarter of 2018, they have officially announced that they would not renew their network-sharing agreement after assessing its mobile business model as financially unsustainable. The two companies remained committed for partnership for content sharing using its existing resources.

=== December ===
- December 1 - Hope Channel Philippines (owned by Gateway UHF Television Broadcasting) migrated its broadcast signal reception to digital terrestrial transmission from switching off its analog frequency in nationwide areas after 17 years.
- December 5 – The Ateneo Blue Eagles wins the UAAP Season 81 men's basketball championship title after defeating the UP Fighting Maroons 2–0 in a best-of-three series. This was their 2nd consecutive title.
- December 8 - After 23 years, Eat Bulaga! transferred their studio from Broadway Centrum to APT Studios in Cainta, Rizal.
- December 12 - ABS-CBN inaugurated its 7.7 land hectare multipurpose complex called Horizon IT Park (also known as ABS-CBN City) located at San Jose del Monte, Bulacan. The Phase 1 of the project includes its first two state-of-the-art sound stages (dubbed as ABS-CBN Soundstage) with each new studio sized at 1,500 square meters, which is on par with Hollywood standards namely, The EL3 Stage (named after its chairman emeritus, Eugenio Lopez III, who visioned of the new studios) and Stage 2. The property hub also includes backlots, production and post-production facilities, and offices.
- December 17 – Catriona Elisa Gray, representing from Oas, Albay, Luzon, Philippines was named as Miss Universe 2018 held at IMPACT Arena, Muang Thong Thani in Nonthaburi Province, northern suburb of Bangkok, Thailand.
- December 25 - Nueva Ecija Singing Ambassadors was crowned as the first-ever Christmas Chorale-Lolling grand winner on Wowowin.
- December 30–31 - Ultimate Fighting Championship ends of its 3-year broadcast rights with The 5 Network's sports division ESPN 5 and pay television network provider, Hyper. Their final broadcast on both networks was UFC 232: Jones vs. Gustafsson 2. After this, It was announced that Fox Networks Group Asia through its sports channel Fox Sports Asia and their digital streaming service Fox+ will be the new home for the UFC starting in the following year; which will ending the localized blackout of UFC fights for the network. Later in the following month, FNGA has subcontracting ESPN5 to carrying the free-to-air rights of the fights on a tape-delay, immediately after its live broadcast on the streaming service, which is as a result of its purchase by Disney in March of the same year.
- December 31 - After 23 years, Destiny Cable shutdown due to its merger with Sky Cable.

== Debuts ==
=== ABS-CBN ===
The following are programs that debuted on ABS-CBN:

- January 6: Pilipinas Got Talent (season 6)
- January 8: Black
- January 15: Asintado
- January 20: MNL48 sa Showtime
- January 22: The King is in Love
- January 29: Sana Dalawa ang Puso
- February 11: G Diaries (season 2)
- February 12: The Blood Sisters
- February 24: Taken (season 1)
- March 5: Bagani and I am Not a Robot
- March 12: W
- April 16: Since I Found You
- April 23: A Love So Beautiful
- April 30: Precious Hearts Romances Presents: Araw Gabi
- May 5: Your Face Sounds Familiar Kids (season 2)
- May 7: Doctor Crush
- June 2: Kape at Salita (DZMM TeleRadyo simulcast)
- June 11: Go Back Couple
- July 2: News Patrol Kapampangan, TV Patrol North Luzon, TV Patrol North Mindanao and TV Patrol South Central Mindanao (ABS-CBN Regional)
- July 9: Hwayugi: A Korean Odyssey
- July 24: My Time with You
- July 28: Pareng Partners
- August 13: Halik
- August 20: Meteor Garden (2018), Ngayon at Kailanman (2018) and Star Hunt: The Grand Audition Show
- August 26: Superbook Reimagined (season 4)
- September 1: The Kids' Choice
- September 10: TV Patrol Eastern Visayas (ABS-CBN TV-2 Tacloban)
- September 16: Coke Studio: Homecoming
- September 17: Playhouse
- September 24: What's Wrong with Secretary Kim
- October 8: Kadenang Ginto
- October 15: Precious Hearts Romances Presents: Los Bastardos and Panay Sikat (ABS-CBN TV-10 Iloilo)
- November 5: Bagong Morning Kapamilya (ABS-CBN TV-3 Baguio and ABS-CBN TV-32 Dagupan)
- November 10: Pinoy Big Brother: Otso
- November 11: Ang Hari: FPJ on ABS-CBN
- November 12: Pinoy Big Brother: Otso Gold

==== Re-runs ====
- May 6: Kung Fu Panda: Legends of Awesomeness (season 1)
- November 11: The Legend of Korra (season 1)

=== GMA ===
The following are programs that debuted on GMA Network:

- January 1: The Maid
- January 8: Yo-kai Watch (season 2)
- January 15: The One That Got Away
- January 21: Sirkus
- January 29: Chibi Maruko-chan (TV drama) and Sherlock Jr.
- February 12: Hunter × Hunter (2011; season 3) and The Stepdaughters
- February 19: Fight for My Way
- February 26: Fighter of Destiny, Hindi Ko Kayang Iwan Ka and The Other Kingdom
- March 12: Ang Forever Ko'y Ikaw and Invincible Teacher (season 1)
- March 19: Contessa
- March 29/June 2: Ben 10 (2016)
- April 1: Lip Sync Battle Philippines (season 3) and The Atom Araullo Specials
- April 2: Mako Mermaids (season 3)
- April 9: 24 Oras Breaking News and Saksi Breaking News
- April 11: Bride of the Water God
- April 21: Tobot (season 3)
- April 23: Detective Conan (season 6)
- April 30: Cinderella and the Four Knights and The Cure
- May 5: The Working Class
- May 7: My Guitar Princess
- May 14: Wolfblood (season 2)
- May 21: Inday Will Always Love You and The File of Young Kindaichi R
- June 4: You're My Destiny
- June 11: Home Foodie (season 4)
- June 17: Amazing Earth
- June 23: Sonic Boom
- June 25: Moribito Final
- July 2: Wings of Love
- July 7: Kapuso Movie Night and The Clash (season 1)
- July 16: Kapag Nahati ang Puso
- July 18: Princess Hours
- July 30: The Fox Fairy and Victor Magtanggol
- August 6: Onanay
- August 27: One Western Visayas (GMA Bacolod and GMA Iloilo) and While You Were Sleeping
- September 3: My Special Tatay
- September 10: Ika-5 Utos and Love O2O
- September 17: Marriage Contract
- September 24: BOOM! (Eat Bulaga!)
- October 8: Pamilya Roces
- October 10: Switch
- October 13: Daddy's Gurl
- October 13: Studio 7
- October 20: Sarap, 'Di Ba?
- October 21: Barangay 143
- October 22: Asawa Ko, Karibal Ko and The Legend of Zu
- November 5: Woman of Dignity
- November 10: Toppstar TV
- November 19: Cain at Abel
- November 26: Waves of Life and Yo-kai Watch (season 3)
- December 3: Don't Dare to Dream and Something About 1%
- December 17: My Golden Life and Rakshasa Street

==== Re-runs ====
- February 24: Angry Birds Toons with Stella and Piggy Tales
- March 24: My Little Pony: Friendship is Magic
- July 30: Voltes V (2017 reboot dub)
- September 24: Daimos (2017 reboot dub)
- September 29: Grami's Circus Show

=== 5 (The 5 Network) ===
The following are programs that debuted on The 5 Network:

- January 11: The Walking Dead season 6
- January 21: Alagang Magaling
- January 27: Hourglass and Wives of House of No. 2
- January 28: Ang Kwarto Sa May Hagdanan and Barrio Kulimlim
- January 30: Vikings season 4
- February 4: ESPN Top Rank Boxing
- February 16: Kuwentong DOTA
- March 3: Salpukan 360
- April 2: The Flash season 3
- April 8: Panalo Ka 'Nay! and Turning Point (season 2)
- April 16: 30 for 30
- April 17: Boxing's Greatest Fights
- April 21: 2018 Filoil Flying V Preseason Premier Cup
- April 21: Brillante Mendoza Presents: Amo
- April 22: IndyCar Series Highlights
- April 28: From the Beautiful Country and Operation: Break Casandra's Heart
- April 29: The Kasambahays and The Mysterious Case of Bea Montenegro
- May 2: Trolls: The Beat Goes On!
- May 4: Supernatural season 12
- May 7: Around the Horn and Pardon the Interruption
- May 10: The Walking Dead season 7
- May 13: WWE Raw
- June 26: Vikings season 5
- July 21: Aja Aja Tayo! (season 1)
- July 27: Ronda Patrol Alas Pilipinas
- July 30: High Noon
- August 1: ESPN's Draft Academy
- August 5: GG Blitz
- August 12: Road to The Nationals
- September 8: Basketball Science
- September 9: The Chasedown
- October 17: Miles from Tomorrowland
- November 3: From Helen's Kitchen, Shootaround and Titas of the Metro
- November 4: Sidecourt Chef

==== Re-runs ====
- January 6: Norn9
- January 21: Chef vs. Mom^{3}
- January 23: Doc McStuffins
- January 27: The 7D
- February 24: Is It Wrong to Try to Pick Up Girls in a Dungeon?
- May 16: Scorpion (season 1)
- June 2: Knights of Sidonia
- July 16: Ultimate Spider-Man^{1}
- July 17: Avengers Assemble^{2}
- August 20: Jake and the Never Land Pirates
- September 10: The Flash season 1^{4}^{5}
- October 6: Oddbods
- October 7: Elena of Avalor and Penn Zero: Part-Time Hero
- November 25: Wander Over Yonder

==== Unknown dates ====
- News5 Headlines (formerly from ABS-CBN)
- Notes
1. ^ ^{a} Originally aired on ABS-CBN
2. ^ ^{b} Originally aired on S+A
3. ^ ^{c} Originally aired on AksyonTV
4. ^ ^{d} Originally aired on ETC
5. ^ ^{e} Originally aired on Jack TV

=== PTV ===
The following are programs that debuted on People's Television Network:

- January 7: The Doctor Is In (season 6)
- January 8: Kangrunaan a Damag (PTV Cordillera (Baguio))
- January 13: Crime Desk
- January 15: Ben Tulfo Unfiltered
- April 30: The Medyo Late Night Show with Jojo A.
- May 7: Tutok Erwin Tulfo
- May 12: Cabinet Report sa TeleRadyo
- June 10: Buhay Abroad
- June 21: Bagong Bayani TV
- July 14: My City, My Love (ASEAN)
- August: ASEAN @ 50: Historical Milestones
- August 13: Jimao
- August 18: Beijing Love Story
- August 19: In The Islands with Anthony Castelo
- September 9: Sammy and Jimie
- September 29: Magsasaka TV
- October 7: Kusina sa Kanayunan
- October 31: NHK Documentaries
- November 1: Usapang SSS
- November 4: The Doctor Is In (season 7)
- November 17: F Talk
- December 3: EZ Shop

=== IBC ===
The following are programs that debuted on IBC:

- November 18: The Best of Retro featuring FBC (Family Birth Control) Rebirth
- December 1: ASK TV: Aktingan, Sayawan at Kantahan

=== Minor networks ===
The following are programs that debuted on minor networks:

- February 13: Worship, Word & Wonders and In Touch with Dr. Charles Stanley on Light TV
- March 6: Prayer Line on Light TV
- April 23: Usapang Pamilya on Light TV
- May 6: UNTV Cup Executive Face Off 2018 on UNTV
- August 26: Young Once Upon a Time on Net 25
- October 11: Roadtrip Refueled on Light TV
- November 27: Huntahang Ligal on UNTV

=== Other channels ===
The following are programs that debuted on other channels:

- January 1: Chuck's World on 2nd Avenue (now defunct)
- January 1: Oh! My Lady on Jeepney TV
- January 1: 2018 FIFA World Cup European Qualifiers and Asean Basketball League on Liga
- January 1: My Heart is Yours and The Color of Passion on Telenovela Channel
- January 2: Jordskott on 2nd Avenue (now defunct)
- January 2: NCIS: Los Angeles season 8 on S+A
- January 3: LA to Vegas on ETC
- January 4: 9-1-1 on 2nd Avenue (now defunct)
- January 6: Warm and Cozy on Jeepney TV
- January 6: Halser Acre on Yey!
- January 8: Star (season 2) on ETC
- January 8: Bob's Burgers season 8, Family Guy season 17 and The Simpsons season 29 on Jack TV
- January 8: Basketball Science on PBA Rush
- January 9: The Magicians (season 2) on ETC
- January 10: America's Next Top Model season 24 on ETC
- January 11: Empire season 4 on Jack TV
- January 18: Modern Family season 9 on 2nd Avenue (now defunct)
- January 20: American Crime Story: The Assassination of Gianni Versace on Jack TV
- January 20: Kuroko's Basketball season 3 on Yey!
- January 22: The Resident (season 1) on 2nd Avenue (now defunct)
- January 22: Ace of Diamond season 1 on Yey!
- January 25: 2018 MPBL season on S+A
- January 27: Isyu One-on-One with Ceasar Soriano on Inquirer 990 Television
- January 29: Lucifer (season 2)on 2nd Avenue (now defunct)
- January 29: Worst Vacation Ever on Discovery Channel
- January 29: Johnny Test on Yey!
- February 1: You're the Worst (season 4) on Jack TV
- February 4: KonekTodo on DZMM TeleRadyo
- February 5: Shades of Blue (season 2) on 2nd Avenue (now defunct)
- February 5: Boljak on AksyonTV
- February 5: Sagot Ka ni Kuya Jobert on Cine Mo!
- February 5: Hotseat on PBA Rush
- February 5: My Life as a Teenage Robot on Yey!
- February 8: Adventure Your Way on AXN Asia and Sony Channel
- February 10: Healthy Sabado and Songhits Tunog Pinoy on DZMM TeleRadyo
- February 12: Rascal the Raccoon on Yey!
- February 14: The Heart Guy season 1 on 2nd Avenue (now defunct)
- February 17: Buhay na Buhay on GMA News TV
- February 17: Kalye Wars on Sari-Sari Channel
- February 18: Culinary Genius on 2nd Avenue (now defunct)
- March 1: Survivor: Ghost Island on Jack TV
- March 5: The Chefs' Line on 2nd Avenue (now defunct)
- March 5: Heard It Through the Grapevine on Jeepney TV
- March 5: The Garfield Show on Yey!
- March 10: Mask on Jeepney TV
- March 11: New Initial D Trilogy on Jeepney TV
- March 12: Robocar Poli on Yey!
- March 12: American Idol season 16 on ETC
- March 18: Top Chef season 14 on 2nd Avenue (now defunct)
- March 23: The Diary of a 30 Something on Sari-Sari Channel
- March 26: American Idol (season 16) on 2nd Avenue and Sony Channel
- April 1: Autopsy: The Last Hours of... (season 5) on Jack TV
- April 2: At The Table (season 2), Ayesha's Home Kitchen, Casa Daza (season 2), Everyday Gourmet, Giada in Italy and The Great British Bake-off: Masterclass season 6 on Metro Channel
- April 2: Central Luzon Ngayon on CLTV 36
- April 3: In The Metro, Island Life, Pia's Postcards and Ride with Mr. Wright on Metro Channel
- April 4: Luxury Homes Revealed, The Art Show and The Real Houses of on Metro Channel
- April 4: The Garfield Show (season 2) on Yey!
- April 5: Driven and The Wine Show (season 2) on Metro Channel
- April 6: Andy and Ben Eat Australia on Metro Channel
- April 8: Tulong Ko, Pasa Mo on DZMM TeleRadyo
- April 11: New Girl season 7 on ETC
- April 14: Myx VJ Search 2018 on Myx
- April 16: My Life as a Teenage Robot (season 2) and Team Yey! (season 3) on Yey!
- April 18: Chicago Fire season 4 on 2nd Avenue (now defunct)
- April 20: 100% Hotter (season 2) on ETC
- April 21: American Horror Story: Cult season 7 on Jack TV
- April 21: Beached on Metro Channel
- April 23: CFO News and Iglesia ni Cristo News Live on INC TV
- April 25: 30 for 30 on AksyonTV
- April 28: Royal Pains (season 7) on 2nd Avenue
- April 30: Chicago Med season 3 on Sony Channel
- May 1: Style Queens on Metro Channel
- May 3: Project Runway season 16 on ETC
- May 3: 2017 WKA King of the Kung-fu World Championship on Liga
- May 6: The World of X Games on AksyonTV
- May 6: Showbiz Pa More! on Jeepney TV
- May 7: My Hero Academia season 1 on Yey!
- May 7: Suits season 7 on Jack TV
- May 9: The Great British Sewing Bee on Metro Channel
- May 12: The Fairly OddParents season 9 on Yey!
- May 13: Odd Mom Out (season 2) on ETC
- May 13: Your Face Sounds Familiar Kids season 2 on Yey!
- May 15: Sports U on Jeepney TV
- May 16: Rated K on Jeepney TV
- May 19: Suits (season 7) on 2nd Avenue (now defunct)
- May 20: Funny Ka, Pare Ko (season 5) on Cine Mo!
- May 21: The Best of New Zealand with Nick Honeyman on Metro Channel
- May 23: My Hero Academia season 2 on Yey!
- May 26: Blindspot (season 3) on 2nd Avenue (now defunct)
- May 28: Agenda with Cito Beltran, Bright Ideas, BusinessWorld Live, Convo, DiscoverEats, Gear Up!, Go Local, MomBiz, One News Now, One News Live, Rush Hour, Shotlist, The Big Story, Titans, The Chiefs, The Philippine Star's Let's Eat and The Philippine Star's Wheels on One News
- May 31: Code Black (season 3) on Sony Channel
- June 1: United Plates of America on Metro Channel
- June 2: Kape at Salita on DZMM Teleradyo
- June 3: 800 Words (season 1) on ETC
- June 4: I Live with Models (season 2) and NCIS season 13, Saturday Night Live season 42 on Jack TV
- June 4: Gordon Ramsay's Ultimate Cookery Course on Metro Channel
- June 5: Popeye: The Sailor Man, RJ 100 Block, RJTV Video Vault, TV Shop Philippines on RJTV
- June 6: Metro Home on Metro Channel
- June 7: Project Runway: Fashion Startup on ETC
- June 9: Agripreneur on GMA News TV
- June 9: Iglesia ni Cristo News Weekend on INC TV
- June 10: Looney Tunes and Merrie Melodies on RJTV
- June 11: It's Showtime sa Primetime, Magandang Buhay: Momshies sa Hapon and TNT: Tapatan ni Tunying on Jeepney TV
- June 12: Mission Possible on Jeepney TV
- June 13: My Puhunan on Jeepney TV
- June 14: Red Alert on Jeepney TV
- June 15: Failon Ngayon on Jeepney TV
- June 15: Class 3C Has a Secret (season 2) on Sari-Sari Channel
- June 17: ASAP: Encore on Jeepney TV
- June 23: Superman on RJTV
- June 23. Brush on Sari-Sari Channel
- June 24: The Final Pitch (season 2) on CNN Philippines
- June 25: LSS: The Martin Nievera Show on ANC
- June 30: Boxing's Greatest Fights and Power & Play with Kom Noli Eala on AksyonTV
- July 1: Who Do You Think You Are? (season 6) on Jack TV
- July 1: 800 Words (season 2), Inside Edition and Entertainment Tonight on ETC
- July 2: The Odd Couple (season 3) on Jack TV
- July 2: The Ellen DeGeneres Show season 15 on ETC
- July 3: Orly and Laila: All Ready! and Orly Mercado: All Ready! on AksyonTV
- July 3: Destination Flavour Scandinavia on Metro Channel
- July 6: Business Round-up on CNN Philippines
- July 7: Around the Horn and Pardon the Interruption on AksyonTV
- July 7: Master Builders on GMA News TV
- July 8: Culinary Genius US on ETC
- July 8: Word of God Network on AksyonTV
- July 9: Person of Interest season 5 on Jack TV
- July 11: Good Job Philippines with Barbie Atienza and Good Trip with Arnel Doria on RJTV
- July 16: Wholesome Meals, Better Life on CNN Philippines
- July 17: WWE Raw on Fox Sports 1/Fox+
- July 19: Suits season 8 on Diva on Jack TV
- July 20: Anthony Bourdain: No Reservations (season 6) on Metro Channel
- July 24: iZombie (season 4) on ETC
- July 27: MasterChef U.S. season 9 on Metro Channel
- July 30: Uncontrollably Fond and Woman with a Suitcase on Asianovela Channel
- July 30: EIC on the Move on Metro Channel
- July 31: Show Me The Market on Metro Channel
- August 4: AC Weekend Cinema on Asianovela Channel
- August 5: Women of Style on Metro Channel
- August 6: In Case You Missed It on CNN Philippines
- August 7: Power to Unite with Elvira on RJTV
- August 11: Are You the One? season 5 on ETC
- August 12: Me and My Town on GMA News TV
- August 12: #killerpost and Inside the Actors Studio (season 21) on Jack TV
- August 18: The Originals season 5 on ETC
- August 20: On the Way to the Airport on Asianovela Channel
- August 20: Life Sentence on ETC
- August 24: Pareng Partners on DZMM Teleradyo
- August 25: Serie A on S+A
- August 25: NBL Philippines on Solar Sports/Basketball TV
- August 27: Bubble Gum on Asianovela Channel
- September 1: KidDO and Newsroom Junior Edition on CNN Philippines
- September 2: Little Big Shots with Steve Harvey (season 1) on Yey!
- September 3: Secrets at the Hotel on Telenovela Channel
- September 5: The Ellen DeGeneres Show season 16 on ETC
- September 8: Uniporme on GMA News TV
- September 9: Culinary Genius UK on ETC
- September 9: The Kids' Choice on Yey!
- September 10: Famous in Love (season 2) on ETC
- September 12: Pareng Partners on Jeepney TV
- September 17: Simply María on Telenovela Channel
- September 25: The Big Bang Theory season 12 on Jack TV
- September 27: Survivor: David vs. Goliath on Jack TV
- September 28: Job Order on Sari-Sari Channel
- September 29: Blue Jeans on Sari-Sari Channel
- October 1: High Society on Asianovela Channel
- October 1: Foodprints (season 6) on Metro Channel
- October 14: Top Chef (season 15) on ETC
- October 15: Bailtang Central Luzon, Central Luzon Tonight and Mornings @ Central Luzon on CLTV 36
- October 18: Spartan: Ultimate Team Challenge (season 2) on Jack TV
- October 22: Sorpresaya on Cine Mo!
- October 23: The Magicians (season 3) on ETC
- October 25: Worship Word & Wonders on GMA News TV
- October 26: Light Up (Friday late night) on GMA News TV
- October 27: How to Be You on GMA News TV
- October 29: Giada Entertains on Metro Channel
- November 3: One-Punch Man season 1 on Yey!
- November 4: The People's Queen on Metro Channel
- November 9: Me, Myself & I on Jack TV
- November 10: Face Off season 12: Divide & Conquer on Jack TV
- November 11: Let's Do Lunch and Toppstar TV on GMA News TV
- November 11: Jamie Oliver's Food Revolution on Metro Channel
- November 17: The Proposal on ETC
- November 18: I Heart PH on CNN Philippines
- November 19: Ask God for Forgiveness Not Me and Fooled Into Love on Telenovela Channel
- November 21: The Bold Type on ETC
- November 21: Matanglawin on Jeepney TV
- November 23: Project Runway All Stars season 6 on ETC
- November 23: Superstore season 2 on Jack TV
- November 24: Haybol Pinoy on DZMM TeleRadyo
- November 26: Digimon Adventure tri. (Part 1 to 3) on Yey!
- December 3: Giada's Holiday Handbook and Spanish and Sexy on Metro Channel
- December 8: Healthy Ever After on GMA News TV
- December 9: Like Pinas (season 3) and The Healthy Juan on GMA News TV
- December 16: Top Chef season 15 on ETC
- December 21: The Legal Mistress on Sari-Sari Channel

==== Re-runs ====
- January 1: FlordeLiza^{1} and Meteor Garden (2001)^{1}^{2}^{15} on Jeepney TV
- January 1: UAAP Season 70 men's basketball tournament on Liga^{14}
- January 6: Sonic X on GMA News TV^{2}
- January 8: Wish I May on Fox Filipino^{2}
- January 8: Agimat: Ang Mga Alamat ni Ramon Revilla: Pepeng Agimat on Jeepney TV^{1}
- January 8: Cedie, Ang Munting Prinsipe on Yey!^{1}
- January 13: One Day, Isang Araw on GMA News TV^{2}
- January 16: The Mysterious Case of Ana Madrigal on Fox Filipino^{8}
- January 17: Barrio Kulimlim on Fox Filipino^{8}
- January 21: Princess and I on Jeepney TV^{1}
- January 22: Orange Marmalade on Jeepney TV^{4}
- January 27: On the Wings of Love on Jeepney TV^{1}
- January 28: Blade Man on Cine Mo!^{7}
- January 29: Love in the Moonlight on Jeepney TV^{1}
- January 29: Yu-Gi-Oh! Zexal season 1 on Yey!^{1}^{6}^{9}
- February 5: Mamaw-in-Law on GMA News TV^{2}
- February 5: Meteor Garden II on Jeepney TV^{1}^{2}^{15}
- February 5: Metal Fight Beyblade 4D on Yey!
- February 12: A Love to Last on Jeepney TV^{1}
- February 12: Because of You on Fox Filipino^{2}
- February 17: Hyde Jekyll, Me on Jeepney TV^{4}
- February 19: That's My Amboy on Fox Filipino^{2}
- February 26: UAAP Season 71 men's basketball tournament on Liga^{14}
- March 5: Honesto on Jeepney TV^{1}
- March 7: Case Solved on Fox Filipino^{2}
- March 11: Yu-Gi-Oh! Arc-V season 1 on Jeepney TV^{5}^{9}
- March 15: Celebrity Playtime on Jeepney TV^{1}
- March 17: Mirror of the Witch on GMA News TV^{2}
- April 1: KonoSuba season 1 on Jeepney TV^{9}
- April 2: Poor Señorita on Fox Filipino^{2}
- April 2: Bridges of Love, Huwag Ka Lang Mawawala and My Love Donna on Jeepney TV^{1}
- April 2: Digimon Frontier on Yey!^{1}^{9}^{14}
- April 7: Cassandra Warrior Angel on AksyonTV^{3}
- April 7: G Diaries (season 2) on ANC and Metro Channel^{1}
- April 9: Dennis the Menace on Yey!
- April 14: Free! on Yey!^{9}
- April 16: Remi, Nobody's Girl on Yey!^{1}
- April 23: Pusong Ligaw on Jeepney TV^{1}
- April 30: Kay Tagal Kang Hinintay, Kung Ako'y Iiwan Mo, Ikaw Lamang and Unforgettable Love on Jeepney TV^{1}
- May 5: Banana Sundae: Rescoop on Jeepney TV^{1}
- May 5: Madam Chairman on AksyonTV^{3}
- May 5: Aliados on GMA News TV^{2}
- May 6: Taken (season 1) on Cine Mo!^{1}
- May 7: Major (seasons 1 to 6)^{9}, SpongeBob SquarePants (season 6 to 8)^{1} and The Trapp Family Singers^{1}^{15} on Yey!
- May 7: Karelasyon and Little Nanay on Fox Filipino^{2}
- May 10: UAAP Season 70 women's volleyball tournaments on Liga^{14}
- May 14: 100 Days to Heaven and Family Feud (3rd incarnation) on Jeepney TV^{1}
- May 14: Peter Pan and Wendy on Yey!^{1}^{14}
- May 20: Free! - Eternal Summer on Yey!^{9}
- May 26: Forevermore on Jeepney TV^{1}
- May 27: NCIS: Los Angeles season 7 on Cine Mo!^{6}
- May 28: America's Next Top Model season 17 on Metro Channel^{10}
- June 3: Kano Luvs Pinay on AksyonTV^{3}
- June 4: Nutri Ventures on Yey!
- June 6: Mr Selfridge (season 3)^{13} and The Millionaire Matchmaker (season 8)^{10} on 2nd Avenue (now defunct)
- June 6: Jojo A. All the Way on RJTV
- June 9: Tyrant (season 3) on 2nd Avenue (now defunct)^{13}
- June 10: Sirkus on GMA News TV^{2}
- June 11: The Half Sisters on Fox Filipino^{2}
- June 11: Familia Zaragoza, Ipaglaban Mo!, Katorse, Minute to Win It: Last Man Standing (season 1) and The Singing Bee (season 5 to 7) on Jeepney TV^{1}
- June 11: Digimon Savers and Naruto: Shippuden season 3 on Yey!^{1}^{9}
- June 14: Rectify (season 3) on 2nd Avenue (now defunct)^{13}
- June 14: America's Next Top Model season 18 on Metro Channel^{10}
- June 16: The Strain (season 3) on 2nd Avenue (now defunct)^{13}
- June 16: Annaliza and Bridges of Love on Jeepney TV^{1}
- June 16: Max Steel (2013) on Yey!^{1}
- June 17: Star (season 1) on 2nd Avenue (now defunct)^{10}
- June 17: Sa Puso Ko, Iingatan Ka on Jeepney TV^{1}
- June 22: Black Work on 2nd Avenue (now defunct)^{13}
- June 25: Samurai X on Yey!^{1}^{9}^{14}^{15}
- July 2: Saimdang: Soulmates Across Time on GMA News TV^{2}
- July 2: I Don't Trust Men Anymore on Telenovela Channel
- July 3: Blindspot (season 1) on AksyonTV^{3}^{12}
- July 7: Cooking Master Boy on Yey!^{1}^{14}
- July 8: Chibi Maruko-chan (TV drama) on GMA News TV^{2}
- July 9: Rubi on Jeepney TV^{1}
- July 9: Adventures of Sonic the Hedgehog on Yey!
- July 16: Danny Phantom on Yey!^{3}^{14}
- July 16: Langit Lupa on Jeepney TV^{1}
- July 23: Pasión de Amor and Tayong Dalawa on Jeepney TV
- July 30: Goblin^{1}, Love in the Moonlight^{1}^{7}, Oh! My Lady^{7} , Orange Marmalade^{4}^{7} and Sensory Couple^{4}^{7} on Asianovela Channel
- August 1: Maharlika Pilipinas Basketball League Datu Cup on Liga^{6}
- August 1: Danny Phantom (season 2) on Yey!^{3}^{14}
- August 2: UAAP Season 71 women's volleyball tournaments on Liga^{14}
- August 4: Avatar: The Legend of Aang on Yey!^{1}^{3}
- August 6: Ismol Family on Fox Filipino^{2}
- August 11: Power Rangers Samurai on Yey!^{1}^{9}
- August 13: Anne of Green Gables^{1}^{2}^{15} and Digimon Xros Wars^{1}^{9} on Yey!
- August 13: Destiny Rose on Fox Filipino^{2}
- August 18: The Heart Guy season 1 on ETC^{12}
- August 20: Be Careful With My Heart on Jeepney TV^{1}
- August 22: Oyayi on Knowledge Channel^{1}
- August 22: Naruto: Shippuden season 4 on Yey!^{1}^{9}
- September 1: Adventure Time^{3}, Ben 10 (2005)^{3}^{16}, The Powerpuff Girls (2016)^{3} and We Bare Bears^{3} on CNN Philippines
- September 3: Legend of the Blue Sea^{1}, The K2^{4}^{7}, The King is in Love^{1}, Warm and Cozy^{7} and Weightlifting Fairy^{1} on Asianovela Channel
- September 3: Mutya on Jeepney TV^{1}
- September 3: Bananas in Pyjamas (season 1) on Yey!
- September 9: The Atom Araullo Specials on GMA News TV^{2}
- September 9: Star Hunt: The Grand Audition Show on Jeepney TV^{1}
- September 10: Marcelino Pan y Vino on Yey!^{1}^{14}
- September 10: Mara Clara (2010) on Jeepney TV^{1}
- September 15: Heroman on Yey!^{1}^{6}^{9}
- September 17: Pretty Woman on GMA News TV^{2}
- September 17: Si Mary at ang Lihim na Hardin on Yey!^{1}
- September 22: La Luna Sangre on Jeepney TV^{1}
- September 23: Dolce Amore on Jeepney TV^{1}
- September 24: My Love Donna on Asianovela Channel^{1}^{7}
- September 24: Prison Break season 1 on AksyonTV^{3}
- September 29: Bagito on Jeepney TV^{1}
- September 29: The Mentalist season 5 on Fox TV Philippines
- September 30: Cold Case season 7 and Elementary on Fox TV Philippines
- October 1: A Love So Beautiful on Asianovela Channel^{1}
- October 1: The Chefs' Line on ETC^{12}
- October 1: Koreana on Fox Filipino^{2}
- October 1: Jewel in the Palace on GMA News TV^{2}^{15}^{17}
- October 1: Momay and The Greatest Love on Jeepney TV^{1}
- October 1: UAAP Season 72 women's volleyball tournaments on Liga^{14}
- October 1: PAW Patrol (season 1) on Yey!
- October 7: 90210 season 5, Hart of Dixie season 2, Hostages, House season 8, Nikita season 3 and Smallville season 10 on Fox TV Philippines
- October 8: I am Not a Robot and My Dearest Intruder on Asianovela Channel^{1}
- October 8: Mr. Bean: The Animated Series on Yey!^{1}^{3}^{14}
- October 13: Fringe season 4, Gossip Girl season 5 and One True Hill season 8 on Fox TV Philippines
- October 13: Crimson Girl on GMA News TV^{2}
- October 15: Hwarang and W on Asianovela Channel^{1}
- October 15: Princess Sarah (1985)^{1}, Remi, Nobody's Girl and The Adventures of Jimmy Neutron, Boy Genius^{1}^{3}^{14} on Yey!
- October 15: Bride of the Water God on GMA News TV^{2}
- October 21: Power Rangers S.P.D. on Yey!^{1}^{9}
- October 22: Alyas Robin Hood season 1 on Fox Filipino^{2}
- October 22: Galema: Anak ni Zuma and Sana Bukas pa ang Kahapon on Jeepney TV^{1}
- October 22: Supergirl season 1 on AksyonTV^{3}^{10}^{11}
- October 29: Mask on Asianovela Channel^{7}
- October 29: Ikaw Lang ang Iibigin, Pilipinas, Game Ka Na Ba? and Princess Sarah (2007) on Jeepney TV^{1}
- October 29: Naruto: Shippuden season 5 on Yey!^{1}^{9}
- November 3: BeyWheelz on Yey!
- November 5: Hyde Jekyll, Me^{4}^{7} and My Time with You^{1} on Asianovela Channel
- November 7: Chicago Fire season 4 and Royal Pains (season 7) on Jack TV^{12}
- November 12: Blade Man on Asianovela Channel^{4}^{7}
- November 12: Little Star on Fox Filipino^{2}
- November 12: Banana Split Extra Scoop and My Dear Heart on Jeepney TV^{1}
- November 12: My Hero Academia (seasons 1 and 2) on Yey!
- November 19: Supergirl season 2 on AksyonTV^{3}^{10}^{11}
- November 19: Love in the Moonlight on Asianovela Channel^{1}^{7}
- November 19: Jang Geum's Dream^{2}^{15} and Little Women II^{1} on Yey!
- November 26: Sensory Couple on Asianovela Channel^{4}^{7}
- November 26: Cinderella and the Four Knights on GMA News TV^{2}
- November 26: Haikyu!! season 2 on Yey!^{9}
- December 1: BeyWarriors: BeyRaiderz on Yey!
- December 3: Black on Asianovela Channel^{1}
- December 3: Jamie & Jimmy's Food Fight Club (season 3) on ETC^{12}
- December 3: Apoy sa Dagat on Jeepney TV^{1}
- December 3: Ace of Diamond season 1 on Yey!
- December 4: Knife Fight (season 4) on ETC^{12}
- December 7: Tatak Pilipino on Jeepney TV^{1}
- December 9: The Best of The Sharon Cuneta Show on Jeepney TV^{1}
- December 10: Blood^{4}^{7} and Heard It Through the Grapevine^{7} on Asianovela Channel
- December 10: Queen Seon-Deok on GMA News TV^{2}^{17}
- December 10: Buena Familia on Fox Filipino^{2}
- December 10: Doble Kara, Give Love on Christmas and Precious Hearts Romances Presents: Bud Brothers on Jeepney TV^{1}
- December 17: Twenty Again^{7} and Unforgettable Love^{1}^{7} on Asianovela Channel
- December 17: Till I Met You on Jeepney TV^{1}
- December 17: The Trapp Family Singers on Yey!^{1}^{15}
- December 22: Muling Buksan ang Puso and Tubig at Langis on Jeepney TV^{1}
- December 24: Go Back Couple^{1} and Good Doctor^{7} on Asianovela Channel
- December 24: You're My Destiny on GMA News TV^{2}
- December 29: BeyWarriors: Cyborg on Yey!
- December 31: Aryana, Lobo and Maging Sino Ka Man (2006) on Jeepney TV^{1}
- December 31: Inazuma Eleven GO and Yu-Gi-Oh! 5D's season 1^{1}^{9} on Yey!
- Notes
1. ^ ^{a} Originally aired on ABS-CBN
2. ^ ^{b} Originally aired on GMA
3. ^ ^{c} Originally aired on The 5 Network
4. ^ ^{d} Originally aired on Cine Mo!
5. ^ ^{e} Originally aired on Yey!
6. ^ ^{f} Originally aired on S+A
7. ^ ^{g} Originally aired on Jeepney TV
8. ^ ^{h} Originally aired on Sari-Sari Channel
9. ^ ^{i} Originally aired on Hero (now defunct)
10. ^ ^{j} Originally aired on ETC
11. ^ ^{k} Originally aired on Jack TV
12. ^ ^{l} Originally aired on 2nd Avenue (now defunct)
13. ^ ^{m} Originally aired on CT (now defunct)
14. ^ ^{n} Originally aired on Studio 23 (now S+A)
15. ^ ^{o} Originally aired on Q (now GMA News TV)
16. ^ ^{p} Originally aired on C/S 9 (now CNN Philippines)
17. ^ ^{q} Originally aired on TeleAsia Filipino (now defunct)

=== Video streaming services ===
The following are programs that debuted on video streaming services:

- February 8: Channel Zero (season 3) on Iflix
- April 6: Chicago Med on Iflix
- May 18: 13 Reasons Why (season 2) on Netflix
- May 31: Reverie on Iflix
- August 15: Live Life with Kris on Iflix
- September 26: This Is Us season 3 on Iflix
- September 27: Star (season 3) on Iflix
- September 28: The Good Place season 3 on Iflix
- October 10: The Flash season 5 on HOOQ and Iflix
- October 15: Supergirl season 4 on HOOQ
- October 16: Arrow season 7 on HOOQ
- October 18: Dynasty season 2 on Netflix
- October 27: Channel Zero (season 4) and Midnight, Texas (season 2) on Iflix

== Returning or renamed programs ==
=== Major networks ===
Show	Last aired	Retitled as/Season/Notes	Channel	Return date
Pilipinas Got Talent	2016	Same (season 6)	ABS-CBN	January 6
Yo-kai Watch	2016	Same (season 2)	GMA	January 8
The Walking Dead	2018	Same (season 6)	The 5 Network	January 11
Vikings	2017	Same (season 4)	The 5 Network	January 30
ABS-CBN Sports presents Top Rank Boxing	2017 (S+A)	ESPN Top Rang Boxing	The 5 Network	February 4
G Diaries	2017	Same (season 2; now a special weekly series)	ABS-CBN	February 11
Hunter × Hunter (2011)	2015	Same (season 3)	GMA	February 12
Philippine Super Liga	2017 (season 5: "Grand Prix Conference")	Same (season 6: "Grand Prix Conference")	The 5 Network / AksyonTV / Hyper	February 17
Lip Sync Battle Philippines	2016	Same (season 3)	GMA	April 1
Mako Mermaids	2016	Same (season 3)	GMA	April 2
The Flash	2017	Same (season 3)	The 5 Network	April 2
Turning Point	2017	Same (season 2)	The 5 Network	April 8
Tobot	2016	Same (season 3)	GMA	April 21
Philippine Basketball Association	2018 (season 43: "Philippine Cup")	Same (season 43: "Commissioner's Cup")	The 5 Network / PBA Rush	April 22
Detective Conan	2016	Same (season 6)	GMA	April 23
Your Face Sounds Familiar: Kids	2017	Same (season 2)	ABS-CBN	May 5
The Walking Dead	2018	Same (season 7)	The 5 Network	May 10
Philippine Super Liga	2018 (season 6: "Grand Prix Conference")	Same (season 6: "Beach Volleyball Challenge Cup")	The 5 Network / AksyonTV / Hyper	May 23
Home Foodie	2018	Same (season 4)	GMA	June 11
Philippine Super Liga	2018 (season 6: "Beach Volleyball Challenge Cup")	Same (season 6: "Invitational Cup")	The 5 Network / AksyonTV / Hyper	June 23
Tawag ng Tanghalan	2018	Same (season 3)	ABS-CBN	June 25
Vikings	2018	Same (season 5)	The 5 Network	June 26
TV Patrol Northern Luzon	2018	TV Patrol North Luzon	ABS-CBN Baguio	July 2
TV Patrol Northern Mindanao	2018	TV Patrol North Mindanao	ABS-CBN Cagayan de Oro	July 2
TV Patrol Socsksargen	2018	TV Patrol South Central Mindanao	ABS-CBN General Santos	July 2
Princess Hours	2007 (ABS-CBN) / 2010 (Studio 23) / 2014 (Jeepney TV)	Same (Thai remake)	GMA	July 17
Philippine Basketball Association	2018 (season 43: "Commissioner's Cup")	Same (season 43: "Governors' Cup")	The 5 Network / PBA Rush	August 17
Meteor Garden	2003 (ABS-CBN) / 2007 (GMA) / 2008 (Q) / 2014 (Jeepney TV)	Same (2018)	ABS-CBN	August 20
Ngayon at Kailanman	2009 (GMA)	Same (2018)	ABS-CBN	August 20
Superbook Reimagined	2018	Same (season 4)	ABS-CBN	August 26
National Football League	2017	Same (2018 season)	The 5 Network	September 7
TV Patrol Tacloban	2018	TV Patrol Eastern Visayas	ABS-CBN Tacloban	September 10
Scandal	2017	Same (season 3)	The 5 Network	September 13
Coke Studio Philippines	2017 (The 5 Network)	Same (season 2: "Homecoming")	ABS-CBN	September 16
NBA Sabados	2018	Same (2018–19 season)	ABS-CBN	October 20
Philippine Super Liga	2018 (season 6: "Invitational Cup")	Same (season 6: "All-Filipino Conference")	The 5 Network / AksyonTV / Hyper	October 30
U.S. NCAA College Basketball	2018	Same (2018–19 season)	The 5 Network	November 7
Pinoy Big Brother	2017 (season 7: "Lucky 7")	Same (season 8: "Otso")	ABS-CBN	November 10
Pinoy Big Brother	2017 (season 7: "Mga Kwento ng Dream Team ni Kuya")	Same (season 8: "Otso Gold")	ABS-CBN	November 12
Yo-kai Watch	2018	Same (season 3)	GMA	November 26
ABS-CBN Headlines	2003 (ABS-CBN)	Same as News5 Headlines	The 5 Network	Unknown

=== State-owned networks ===
Show	Last aired	Retitled as/Season/Notes	Channel	Return date
The Doctor Is In	2016	Same (season 6)	PTV	January 7
Like Pinas	2016	Same (season 2)	PTV	January 20
The Doctor Is In	2018	Same (season 7: "Made More Fun")	PTV	November 4
EZ Shop	2015	Same	PTV	December 3

=== Minor networks ===
Show	Last aired	Retitled as/Season/Notes	Channel	Return date
UNTV Cup	2018	Same (season 7)	UNTV	September 3

=== Other channels ===
Show	Last aired	Retitled as/Season/Notes	Channel	Return date
NCIS: Los Angeles	2017	Same (season 8)	S+A	January 2
Star	2017	Same (season 2)	ETC on SBN	January 8
The Simpsons	2017	Same (season 29)	Jack TV	January 8
Family Guy	2017	Same (season 17)	Jack TV	January 8
Bob's Burgers	2017	Same (season 8)	Jack TV	January 8
The Magicians	2016	Same (season 2)	ETC on SBN	January 9
America's Next Top Model	2017	Same (cycle 24)	ETC on SBN	January 10
Empire	2017	Same (season 4)	Jack TV	January 11
Modern Family	2017	Same (season 9)	2nd Avenue on RJTV (now defunct)	January 18
PBA D-League	2017 (season 6: "Foundation Cup")	Same (season 7: "Aspirants' Cup")	AksyonTV	January 18
You're the Worst	2017	Same (season 4)	Jack TV	February 1
UAAP Men's & Women's Volleyball	2017	Same (season 80)	Liga / S+A	February 2
UAAP Men's Football	2017	Same (season 80)	Liga / S+A	February 4
Shades of Blue	2017	Same (season 2)	2nd Avenue on RJTV (now defunct)	February 5
Survivor	2017 (season 35: "Heroes vs. Healers vs. Hustlers")	Same (season 36: "Ghost Island")	Jack TV	March 1
Philippines Football League	2017 (PTV)	Same (season 2)	AksyonTV (Opening match only) / Sportradar (all matches)	March 3
American Idol	2016	Same (season 16)	ETC on SBN / Sony Channel / 2nd Avenue on RJTV (now defunct)	March 12 / March 26
Top Chef	2016	Same (season 14 )	2nd Avenue on RJTV (now defunct)	March 18
Relasyon	2017	Same	AksyonTV	March 21
Casa Daza	2017 (Lifestyle)	Same (season 2)	Metro Channel	April 2
Chasing Flavors	2017 (Lifestyle)	Same (season 2: "At the Table")	Metro Channel	April 2
New Girl	2017	Same (season 7)	ETC on SBN	April 11
Myx VJ Search 2018	2017	Same (new season)	Myx	April 14
Chicago Fire	2015 (CT)	Same (season 4)	2nd Avenue (now defunct)	April 18
100% Hotter	2018	Same (season 2)	ETC on SBN	April 20
American Horror Story	2016	Same (season 7: "AHS: Cult")	Jack TV	April 21
Royal Pains	2015 (CT)	Same (season 7)	2nd Avenue on RJTV (now defunct)	April 28
Project Runway	2017	Same (season 16)	ETC on SBN	May 3
Premier Volleyball League	2017 (season 1: "Collegiate Conference")	Same (season 2: "Reinforced Conference"; season 15 as Shakey's V-League)	Liga / S+A	May 6
Suits	2017	Same (season 7)	Jack TV / 2nd Avenue on RJTV	May 7 (Jack TV); May 19 (2nd Avenue)
Odd Mom Out	2016	Same (season 2)	ETC on SBN	May 13
Women's National Basketball Association	2017	Same (2018 season)	S+A (Sky Cable, Sky Direct, Destiny Cable and Free TV) / Basketball TV / NBA Premium TV (Cignal, Easy TV and other cable providers excluding Sky Cable)	May 19
Funny Ka, Pare Ko	2017	Same (season 5)	Cine Mo!	May 20
My Hero Academia	2018	Same (season 2)	Yey!	May 23
Blindspot	2017	Same (season 3)	2nd Avenue on RJTV	May 26
PBA D-League	2018 (season 7: "Aspirants' Cup")	Same (season 7: "Foundation Cup")	AksyonTV	June 4
NCIS	2017 (CT)	Same (season 13)	Jack TV	June 4
I Live with Models	2016	Same (season 2)	Jack TV	June 4
Saturday Night Live	2016	Same (season 42)	Jack TV	June 4
Maharlika Pilipinas Basketball League	2018	Same (2018 season)	S+A	June 12 (Datu Cup)
800 Words	2018	Same (season 2)	ETC on SBN	July 1
The Odd Couple	2017	Same (season 3)	Jack TV	July 2
Morning Calls with Laila Chikadora	2013	Same	AksyonTV	July 3
National Collegiate Athletic Association	2017	Same (season 94)	Liga / S+A	July 7
Person of Interest	2015 (CT)	Same (season 5)	Jack TV	July 9
Suits	2018	Same (season 8)	Diva / Jack TV	July 19
Premier Volleyball League	2018 (season 2: "Reinforced Conference")	Same (season 2: "Collegiate Conference"; season 15 as Shakey's V-League)	Liga / S+A	July 21
iZombie	2017	Same (season 4)	ETC on SBN	July 24
MasterChef U.S.	2017 (Lifestyle)	Same (season 9)	Metro Channel	July 27
Are You the One?	2018	Same (season 5)	ETC on SBN	August 11
English Premier League	2018	Same (2018–19 season)	S+A	August 11
Inside the Actors Studio	2015 (My Movie Channel)	Same (season 21)	Jack TV	August 12
Showbiz Pa More!	2018	Same (season 2)	Jeepney TV	August 12
The Originals	2017	Same (season 5)	ETC on SBN	August 18
La Liga	2018	Same (2018–19 season)	S+A	August 20
Asia's Next Top Model	2018	Same (season 6: "Cycle 6")	Fox Life	August 22
The Ellen DeGeneres Show	2018	Same (season 16)	ETC on SBN	September 5
Universities and Colleges Basketball League	2017 (IBC)	Same (season 3)	AksyonTV	September 6
University Athletic Association of the Philippines	2017	Same (season 81)	Liga / S+A	September 8
Famous in Love	2017	Same (season 2)	ETC on SBN	September 10
University Town	2017	Same (season 3)	S+A	September 15
Premier Volleyball League	2018 (season 2: "Collegiate Conference")	Same (season 2: "Open Conference"; season 15 as Shakey's V-League)	Liga / S+A	September 22
The Big Bang Theory	2018	Same (season 12)	Jack TV	September 25
Survivor	2018 (season 36: "Ghost Islands")	Same (season 37: "David vs Goliath")	Jack TV	September 27
Spikers' Turf	2016 (S+A; season 2: "Reinforced Conference")	Same (season 3: "Open Conference")	Hyper	October 6
DC's Legends of Tomorrow	2017	Same (season 3)	Jack TV	October 14
Top Chef	2017	Same (season 14)	ETC on SBN	October 14
National Basketball Association	2018	Same (2018–19 season)	S+A (Free TV, Sky Cable and Sky Direct since October 28) / Basketball TV / NBA Premium TV (Cignal, Easy TV and other cable providers excluding Sky Cable since October 28)	October 17
Spartan: Ultimate Team Challenge	2017	Same (season 2)	Jack TV	October 18
The Magicians	2017	Same (season 3)	ETC on SBN	October 23
Project Runway All Stars	2017	Same (season 6)	ETC on SBN	November 23
Superstore	2017	Same (season 2)	Jack TV	November 23
Like Pinas	2018 (PTV)	Same (season 3)	GMA News TV	December 9
Top Chef	2018	Same (season 15)	ETC on SBN	December 16

=== Video streaming services ===
Show	Last aired	Retitled as/Season/Notes	Service	Return date
Channel Zero	2017 (season 2: "No-End House")	Same (season 3: "Butcher's Block")	Iflix	February 8
This Is Us	2018	Same (season 3)	Iflix	September 26
Star	2018	Same (season 3)	Iflix	September 27
The Good Place	2018	Same (season 3)	Iflix	September 28
The Flash	2017 (ETC / Jack TV)	Same (season 5)	HOOQ / Iflix	October 10
Supergirl	2017 (ETC / Jack TV)	Same (season 4)	HOOQ	October 15
Arrow	2017 (2nd Avenue / Jack TV)	Same (season 7)	HOOQ	October 16
Riverdale	2017	Same (season 2)	Netflix	October 18
Dynasty	2017	Same (season 2)	Netflix	October 20
Channel Zero	2018 (season 3: "Butcher's Block")	Same (season 4: "The Dream Door")	Iflix	October 27
Midnight, Texas	2017	Same (season 2)	Iflix	October 27

== Programs transferring networks ==
=== Major networks ===
Date	Show	No. of seasons	Moved from	Moved to
January 21	Alagang Magaling	—N/a	PTV	The 5 Network
February 4	Top Rank Boxing	—N/a	S+A (as ABS-CBN Sports presents Top Rank Boxing)	The 5 Network (as ESPN Top Rank Boxing)
March 3	Salpukan 360	—N/a	IBC	The 5 Network
April 21	Filoil Flying V Preseason Premier Cup	—N/a	S+A	The 5 Network
May 13	WWE Raw	—N/a	Fox Philippines	The 5 Network
July 18	Princess Hours	—N/a	ABS-CBN / Studio 23 (now S+A) / Jeepney TV (as Korean original series)	GMA (as Thai remake)
August 20	Ngayon at Kailanman	—N/a	GMA	ABS-CBN (as a remake)
September 16	Coke Studio Philippines	2	The 5 Network	ABS-CBN
Unknown	ABS-CBN Headlines	—N/a	ABS-CBN	The 5 Network (as News5 Headlines)

=== State-owned networks ===
Date	Show	No. of seasons	Moved from	Moved to
April 30	The Medyo Late Night Show with Jojo A.	—N/a	The 5 Network	PTV

=== Minor networks ===
Date	Show	No. of seasons	Moved from	Moved to
June 10	Looney Tunes	—N/a	RPN (now CNN Philippines) / GMA / Studio 23 (now S+A)	RJ DigiTV
June 10	Merrie Melodies	—N/a	RPN (now CNN Philippines) / ABS-CBN / GMA	RJ DigiTV

=== Other channels ===
Date	Show	No. of seasons	Moved from	Moved to
January 8	Cedie, Ang Munting Prinsipe	—N/a	ABS-CBN	Yey!
January 20	Kuroko's Basketball	3	Hero (now defunct)	Yey!
January 20	American Crime Story	2	CT (now defunct)	Jack TV
March 3	Philippines Football League	—N/a	PTV	AksyonTV (Opening match only) / Sportradar (all matches)
March 11	Initial D	—N/a	GMA / Q (now GMA News TV) / Hero (now defunct)	Jeepney TV
March 11	Yu-Gi-Oh! Arc-V	1	Hero (now defunct) / Yey!	Jeepney TV
March 12	American Idol	16	Star World (now Fox Life)	Sony Channel
March 29	Elementary	5	CT (now defunct)	Jack TV
April 1	KonoSuba	1	Hero (now defunct)	Jeepney TV
April 1	Autopsy: The Last Hours of...	5	CT (now defunct)	Jack TV
April 8	Tulong Ko, Pasa Mo	—N/a	The 5 Network	DZMM TeleRadyo
April 18	Chicago Fire	4	CT (now defunct)	2nd Avenue (now defunct)
April 28	Royal Pains	7	CT (now defunct)	2nd Avenue (now defunct)
May 5	Motive	4	CT (now defunct)	2nd Avenue (now defunct)
May 6	Taken	1	ABS-CBN	Cine Mo!
May 28	The Big Story	—N/a	Bloomberg TV Philippines (now One News)	One News
June 4	NCIS	13	CT (now defunct)	Jack TV
June 5	Inside Edition	—N/a	2nd Avenue (now defunct)	ETC
June 5	Entertainment Tonight	—N/a	2nd Avenue (now defunct)	ETC
June 6	Ellen	15	2nd Avenue (now defunct)	ETC
June 6	The Millionaire Matchmaker	8	ETC	2nd Avenue (now defunct)
June 6	Mr Selfridge	3	CT (now defunct)	2nd Avenue (now defunct)
June 9	Tyrant	3	CT (now defunct)	2nd Avenue (now defunct)
June 14	Rectify	3	CT (now defunct)	2nd Avenue (now defunct)
June 16	The Strain	3	CT (now defunct)	2nd Avenue (now defunct)
June 22	Black Work	—N/a	CT (now defunct)	2nd Avenue (now defunct)
June 24	The Final Pitch	2	History	CNN Philippines
July 1	Who Do You Think You Are?	6	2nd Avenue (now defunct)	Jack TV
July 7	Cooking Master Boy	—N/a	ABS-CBN / Studio 23 (now S+A)	Yey!
July 8	Culinary Genius	1	2nd Avenue (now defunct)	ETC
July 9	Person of Interest	5	CT (now defunct)	Jack TV
July 16	Danny Phantom	—N/a	The 5 Network / Studio 23 (now S+A)	Yey!
July 20	Anthony Bourdain: No Reservations	6	2nd Avenue (now defunct)	Metro Channel
July 30	Oh My Lady!	—N/a	Jeepney TV	Asianovela Channel
August 12	Inside the Actors Studio	21	My Movie Channel (now defunct)	Jack TV
August 13	Anne of Green Gables	—N/a	ABS-CBN / GMA / Q (now GMA News TV)	Yey!
August 13	Digimon Xros Wars	—N/a	ABS-CBN / Hero (now defunct)	Yey!
August 18	The Heart Guy	1	2nd Avenue (now defunct)	ETC
September 1	We Bare Bears	—N/a	The 5 Network	CNN Philippines
September 1	The Powerpuff Girls (2016)	—N/a	The 5 Network	CNN Philippines
September 1	Adventure Time	—N/a	The 5 Network	CNN Philippines
September 3	Warm and Cozy	—N/a	Jeepney TV	Asianovela Channel
September 5	TMZ on TV	—N/a	ETC	Jack TV
September 6	Universities and Colleges Basketball League	3	IBC	AksyonTV
October 1	The Chefs' Line	1	2nd Avenue (now defunct)	ETC
October 14	Top Chef	14	2nd Avenue (now defunct)	ETC
November 7	Royal Pains	7	2nd Avenue (now defunct)	Jack TV
November 7	Chicago Fire	4	2nd Avenue (now defunct)	Jack TV
December 3	Jamie & Jimmy's Food Fight Club	3	2nd Avenue (now defunct)	ETC
December 4	Knife Fight	4	2nd Avenue (now defunct)	ETC
December 9	Like Pinas	3	PTV	GMA News TV
December 10	Blood	—N/a	Cine Mo! / Jeepney TV	Asianovela Channel
December 10	Heard It Through the Grapevine	—N/a	Jeepney TV	Asianovela Channel

=== Video streaming services ===
Date	Show	No. of seasons	Moved from	Moved to
October 10	The Flash	5	ETC / Jack TV	HOOQ / Iflix
October 15	Supergirl	4	ETC / Jack TV	HOOQ
October 16	Arrow	7	2nd Avenue (now defunct) / Jack TV	HOOQ

== Milestone episodes ==
The following shows made their Milestone episodes in 2018:

Show	Network	Episode #	Episode title	Episode air date
My Korean Jagiya	GMA	100th	"Follow Your Dream"	January 5
Dear Uge	GMA	100th	"Viva Probinsyana"	January 7
La Luna Sangre	ABS-CBN	150th	"New Moon"	January 12
The Tonight Show Starring Jimmy Fallon	Jack TV	800th	"Sam Rockwell / Tig Notaro"	January 12
It's Showtime	ABS-CBN	2,600th	"#ShowtimeEneroDeSeizeTheMoment"	January 16
Eat Bulaga!	GMA	11,600th	"11,600th episode"	January 16
FPJ's Ang Probinsyano	ABS-CBN	600th	"Pagplanuhan"	January 19
Tonight with Boy Abunda	ABS-CBN	600th	"James Reid and Nadine Lustre Interview"	January 19
Celebrity Bluff	GMA	200th	"We Love CB"	January 20
Impostora	GMA	150th	"Salisi"	January 26
Wildflower	ABS-CBN	250th	"Pag-aklas"	January 31
Haplos	GMA	150th	"Hilo"	February 2
Wish Ko Lang!	GMA	800th	800th Episode	February 3
Ika-6 na Utos	GMA	350th	"Pagpapahirap"	February 7
Mukha	ANC	200th	"Mukha 200"	February 7
Wowowin	GMA	550th	"#Wowowin"	February 7
The Good Son	ABS-CBN	100th	"Pagluhod"	February 9
Magandang Buhay	ABS-CBN	500th	"Kapag Marunong Kang Magbigay Pugay at Magpapasalamat sa Hero ng Buhay Mo, Siguradong Mayroong... Magandang Buhay!"	March 5
Family Guy	Jack TV	300th	"Dog Bites Bear"	March 26
Elementary	Jack TV	100th	"Henny Penny the Sky is Falling"	March 26
FPJ's Ang Probinsyano	ABS-CBN	650th	"Gwardyado"	April 3
Tonight with Boy Abunda	ABS-CBN	650th	"Cacai Bautista Interview"	April 3
Modern Family	2nd Avenue on RJTV	200th	"Dear Beloved Family"	April 5
The Big Bang Theory	Jack TV	250th	"The Tenant Disassociation"	April 6
Hanggang Saan	ABS-CBN	100th	"Kabayaran"	April 17
Kambal, Karibal	GMA	100th	"Pagligtas"	April 17
Wowowin	GMA	600th	"#Wowowin"	April 20
Royal Pains	2nd Avenue on RJTV	100th	"Doubt of Africa"	April 29
Magandang Buhay	ABS-CBN	550th	"Kapag Mas Masaya ang Summer Activities, Dahil Always Be Youthful Araw-Araw at Hatid Namin sa Isang... Magandang Buhay!"	May 2
It's Showtime	ABS-CBN	2,700th	"#TNT2Q4AwitKayinay"	May 16
Eat Bulaga!	GMA	11,700th	"11,700th episode"	May 16
Suits	Jack TV / 2nd Avenue on RJTV (now defunct)	100th	"100"	May 16 / May 19
Kapuso Mo, Jessica Soho	GMA	700th	"#KMJS"	May 27
Asintado	ABS-CBN	100th	"Akusasyon"	June 5
FPJ's Ang Probinsyano	ABS-CBN	700th	"Magkasama"	June 12
Tonight with Boy Abunda	ABS-CBN	700th	"Jhaiho Interview"	June 12
Healing Galing	The 5 Network	200th	"Natural na Lunas sa Baradong Ugat sa Puso"	June 17
Sana Dalawa ang Puso	ABS-CBN	100th	"Make or Break"	June 19
Iskoolmates	PTV	100th	Philippine Inter Collegiate Debating Championship	June 21
Sunday PinaSaya	GMA	150th	"Ulan Sa Saya"	June 24
Kambal, Karibal	GMA	150th	"Pagtawag"	June 26
NCIS	Jack TV	300th	"Scope"	June 27
Wowowin	GMA	650th	"#Wowowin"	June 29
The Stepdaughters	GMA	100th	"Adrift"	July 3
The Blood Sisters	ABS-CBN	100th	"Pasabog"	July 3
Pepito Manaloto	GMA	300th	"Paminta"	July 7
Contessa	GMA	100th	"Revenge is Over"	July 16
Hindi Ko Kayang Iwan Ka	GMA	100th	"Bomba"	July 17
Person of Interest	Jack TV	100th	"The Day the World Went Away"	July 20
The Tonight Show Starring Jimmy Fallon	Jack TV	900th	"Tom Cruise / Parker Posey"	July 24
Bagani	ABS-CBN	100th	"Huwad"	July 24
Asintado	ABS-CBN	150th	"Panganib"	August 15
Ipaglaban Mo!	ABS-CBN	200th	"Kakampi"	August 18
FPJ's Ang Probisyano	ABS-CBN	750th	"Pipigain"	August 21
Tonight with Boy Abunda	ABS-CBN	750th	"Ogie Alcasid Interview"	August 21
Sana Dalawa ang Puso	ABS-CBN	150th	"Emergency"	August 28
Wowowin	GMA	700th	"#Wowowin"	September 7
It's Showtime	ABS-CBN	2,800th	"?"	September 10
Eat Bulaga!	GMA	11,800th	"11,800th episode"	September 10
The Stepdaughters	GMA	150th	"Paalam Muylabs"	September 11
I Can See Your Voice	ABS-CBN	100th	"ICYSYV Anniversary with Daniel"	September 15
Araw Gabi	ABS-CBN	100th	"Yaman"	September 17
Magpakailanman	GMA	300th	"Kapag Tumibok Ang Puso (The Rose and Dexter Sabiro Love Story)"	September 29
Inday Will Always Love You	GMA	100th	"Bonggang Finale"	October 5
FPJ's Ang Probinsyano	ABS-CBN	800th	"Pinagkanulo"	October 30
Tonight with Boy Abunda	ABS-CBN	800th	"Vice Ganda Interview"	October 30
Wowowin	GMA	750th	"#Wowowin"	November 16
Onanay	GMA	100th	"Lady Tower Heart"	December 21
Halik	ABS-CBN	100th	"Halik at Pananagutan"	December 28

== Finales ==
=== ABS-CBN ===
The following are programs that ended on ABS-CBN:

- January 5: Hwarang
- January 12: Pusong Ligaw
- January 19: Goblin (rerun)
- January 26: Ikaw Lang ang Iibigin
- February 9: Wildflower
- February 17: Shake, Rattle and Roll Sabado Specials
- March 2: La Luna Sangre and The King is in Love
- March 9: Black
- April 13: The Good Son
- April 20: I am Not a Robot
- April 27: Hanggang Saan
- April 29: Pilipinas Got Talent season 6 and Teenage Mutant Ninja Turtles season 3
- May 4: W
- May 26: Sa Kabukiran (Saturday edition, DZMM TeleRadyo simulcast)
- June 8: A Love So Beautiful
- June 23: Kapamilya, Mas Winner Ka! - Bacolod (ABS-CBN Regional)
- June 24: Agri Tayo Dito and Mag TV Na (ABS-CBN Regional)
- June 29: TV Patrol Cagayan Valley, TV Patrol Central Mindanao, TV Patrol Caraga, TV Patrol Ilocos, TV Patrol North Central Luzon, TV Patrol Northern Luzon, TV Patrol Northern Mindanao, TV Patrol Pampanga and TV Patrol Socsksargen (ABS-CBN Regional)
- June 30: Kapamilya, Mas Winner Ka! - Cebu and Davao (ABS-CBN Regional)
- July 6: Doctor Crush
- July 20: Go Back Couple
- August 10: Since I Found You
- August 17: Bagani, My Time With You and The Blood Sisters
- August 19: Superbook Reimagined (season 3) and Your Face Sounds Familiar Kids season 2
- September 7: TV Patrol Tacloban (ABS-CBN TV-2 Tacloban)
- September 14: Sana Dalawa ang Puso
- September 21: Hwayugi: A Korean Odyssey
- October 5: Asintado
- October 12: Precious Hearts Romances Presents: Araw Gabi and Sikat Ka! Iloilo (ABS-CBN TV-10 Iloilo)
- October 13: Sikat Ka! Iloilo Sabado (ABS-CBN TV-10 Iloilo)
- November 2: Naimbag Nga Morning Kapamilya and Bagong Umaga, Bagong Balita (ABS-CBN TV-3 Baguio and ABS-CBN TV-32 Dagupan)
- November 4: Kung Fu Panda: Legends of Awesomeness season 1 (rerun) and The Kids' Choice
- November 9: Star Hunt: The Grand Audition Show and What's Wrong with Secretary Kim
- December 2: Coke Studio: Homecoming
- December 16: G Diaries (season 2)
- December 30: Superbook Reimagined (season 4)

==== Stopped airing ====
Program	Stopped airing	Resumed airing	Reason
Taken (season 1)	March 17	May 6 (on Cine Mo!)	Cancelled after 4 episodes and replaced by KB: Sabado Thriller movie block permanently. Full season run transferred to Cine Mo! on May 6.
Kapamilya Mega Blockbusters	November 4	September 29, 2019 (renamed as Kapamilya Super Blockbusters)	Program pre-empted by Ang Hari: FPJ on ABS-CBN movie block special beginning November 11. Movie block renamed as Kapamilya Super Blockbusters on September 29, 2019.

=== GMA ===
The following are programs that ended on GMA Network:

- January 5: One Piece season 10
- January 12: My Korean Jagiya
- January 14: Road Trip
- January 26: Super Ma'am and The Maid
- February 2: The Lolas' Beautiful Show
- February 4: Bossing & Ai
- February 9: Impostora (2017) and Jackie Chan Adventures (rerun)
- February 15: The Romantic Doctor
- February 17: Grami's Circus Show
- February 23: Chibi Maruko-chan (TV drama), Crimson Girl and Haplos
- March 9: Dragon Ball Z Kai: The Final Chapter
- March 17: Ika-6 na Utos and Joker
- March 25: All-Star Videoke
- March 28: The Other Kingdom
- April 6: Yo-kai Watch (season 2)
- April 8: GMA News Update / GMA Breaking News
- April 10: Fight for My Way
- April 15: Gaist Crusher and Sirkus
- April 20: Hunter × Hunter (2018; season 3)
- April 27: Mako Mermaids (season 3) and Sherlock Jr.
- May 4: Ang Forever Ko'y Ikaw
- May 11: Fighter of Destiny
- May 18: Invincible Teacher season 1 and The One That Got Away
- May 31: Bride of the Water God
- June 17: Gyrozetter
- June 22: Wolfblood (season 2)
- June 29: Cinderella and the Four Knights
- June 30: Celebrity Bluff (season 16) and Dragon Ball Z (rerun)
- July 1: Lip Sync Battle Philippines (season 3)
- July 13: My Guitar Princess
- July 17: You're My Destiny
- July 27: Moribito Final, The Cure and The File of Young Kindaichi R
- August 3: Kambal, Karibal
- August 23: Princess Hours
- August 31: Hindi Ko Kayang Iwan Ka
- September 2: Ultraman Ginga
- September 7: The Fox Fairy
- September 8: Contessa
- September 14: Home Foodie season 4 and Wings of Love
- September 21: Detective Conan season 6 and Voltes V (2017 reboot dub) (rerun)
- September 22: My Little Pony: Friendship is Magic (rerun)
- September 30: The Clash
- October 5: Inday Will Always Love You
- October 9: While You Were Sleeping
- October 13: Sarap Diva
- October 19: Love O2O and The Stepdaughters
- November 2: Kapag Nahati ang Puso
- November 16: Victor Magtanggol
- November 22: Switch
- November 23: Daimos (2017 reboot dub) (rerun)
- November 30: Marriage Contract and Woman of Dignity
- December 14: Pamilya Roces and The Legend of Zu

==== Stopped airing ====
Program	Stopped airing	Resumed airing	Reason
Ben 10 (2016)	March 31	June 2	Holy Week special only with 3 episodes. The program resumed on June 2.
Barangay 143	December 16	March 31, 2019	Program on season break, resumed on March 31, 2019.

=== 5 (The 5 Network) ===
The following are programs that ended on The 5 Network:

- January 4: The Walking Dead season 5
- January 8: Pimp My Ride
- January 19: Henry Hugglemonster (rerun)
- January 20: 10 Signatures to Bargain with God and Hapi House
- January 21: Penn Zero: Part-Time Hero, The Mysterious Case of Ana Madrigal and Taddy Taddy Po
- January 23: Supergirl season 2
- February 10: Movie Max 5
- February 17: Norn9 (rerun)
- March 16: Kuwentong DOTA
- March 25: Versus
- March 26: Arrow season 4
- March 28: Shop Japan: Oaklawn Home Shopping
- April 1: Chef vs. Mom (rerun)
- April 21: Hourglass and Wives of House of No. 2
- April 22: Ang Kwarto Sa May Hagdanan and Barrio Kulimlim
- May 3: The Walking Dead season 6
- May 5: 2018 PSL Grand Prix Conference
- May 9: Blindspot (season 2)
- May 27: Is It Wrong to Try to Pick Up Girls in a Dungeon? (rerun), Panalo Ka 'Nay!, Turning Point (season 2)
- June 3: IndyCar Series Highlights
- June 19: Vikings season 4
- July 7: Knights of Sidonia (rerun)
- July 13: Ridiculousness
- July 14: Brillante Mendoza Presents: Amo
- July 28: 2018 PSL Invitational Cup, From the Beautiful Country and Operation: Break the Casanova's Heart
- July 29: The Kasambahays and The Mysterious Case of Bea Montenegro
- August 16: Sofia the First (rerun)
- August 17: ESPN's Draft Academy
- August 24: The Walking Dead season 7
- September 3: The Flash season 3
- September 4: Vikings season 5
- September 13: The World of X Games
- September 28: Supernatural season 12
- September 30: Star vs. the Forces of Evil and The 7D (rerun)
- October 5: Ronda Patrol Alas Pilipinas
- October 6: Salpukan 360
- October 16: Doc McStuffins (rerun)
- October 27: Aja Aja Tayo! (season 1)
- October 28: Elena of Avalor (rerun)
- November 3: Oddbods (rerun)
- December 8: Titas of the Metro
- December 20: 2018 PSL All-Filipino Conference and 2018 PSL Collegiate Grand Slam Conference
- December 24: All Hail King Julien
- December 25: Dragons: Race to the Edge
- December 26: Trolls: The Beat Goes On!
- December 27: The Adventures of Puss in Boots
- December 28: Voltron: Legendary Defender (rerun)
- December 30: Ultimate Fighting Championship, Wander Over Yonder (rerun) and Winx Club

==== Stopped airing ====
Program	Stopped airing	Resumed airing	Reason
Ultimate Spider-Man	August 18	September 3	Both programs pre-empted by 2018 Asian Games. Both programs resumed on September 3 and 4.
Avengers Assemble	August 18	September 4	Both programs pre-empted by 2018 Asian Games. Both programs resumed on September 3 and 4.
Penn Zero: Part-Time Hero (rerun)	October 28	December 31	Series break. Program resumed on December 31.

=== PTV ===
The following are programs that ended on People's Television Network:

- January 14: Alagang Magaling
- April 27: Kilos Pronto
- April 29: ITravelPinas
- May 5: Like Pinas (season 2)
- July 1: Buhay Abroad
- June 29: Oras ng Katotohanan
- November 16: The Medyo Late Night Show with Jojo A.
- December 29: Tahor: Your Ultimate Gamefowl Show
- December 30: TV Shop Philippines

=== IBC ===
The following are programs that ended on IBC:

- February 9: IBC NewsBreak
- February 18: Oras ng Katotohanan
- February 24: Salpukan 360
- December 23: The Best of Retro featuring FBC (Family Birth Control) Rebirth

=== Minor networks ===
The following are programs that ended on minor networks:

- March 15: Legal Forum on Light TV

=== Other channels ===
The following are programs that ended on other channels:

- January 1: Machete on Fox Filipino
- January 3: Anohana: The Flower We Saw That Day on Hero (now defunct)
- January 5: All My Life on Fox Filipino
- January 5: Adyenda on GMA News TV
- January 5: Kapamilya, Deal or No Deal (season 5) on Jeepney TV
- January 6: Little Big Shots on Yey!
- January 9: Class 3-C Has a Secret on Fox Filipino
- January 10: Ang Kuwarto sa May Hagdanan on Fox Filipino
- January 14: Are You the One? season 4 on ETC
- January 14: The Legal Wife (rerun) on Jeepney TV
- January 15: Famous in Love (season 1) on ETC
- January 16: Love Live! Sunshine!! (season 1) on Hero (now defunct)
- January 16: People of Earth (season 2) on Jack TV
- January 19: Style Factory (season 1) on ETC
- January 19: The K2 on Jeepney TV
- January 19: Major (seasons 1 to 6) on Yey!
- January 21: Blood (rerun) on Cine Mo!
- January 21: The Better Half on Jeepney TV
- January 22: Liar (season 1) and Lucifer on 2nd Avenue (now defunct)
- January 25: Oh! My Lady on Jeepney TV
- January 26: DC's Legends of Tomorrow season 2 on 2nd Avenue (now defunct)
- January 26: 100% Hotter (season 1) on ETC
- January 26: Samurai X on Yey!
- January 28: Dishkarte of the Day on GMA News TV
- January 28: Hero TV Tambayan and Hero Theatrixx on Hero (now defunct)
- February 2: Lakas Tawa on Cine Mo!
- February 2: The Good Place season 2 on ETC
- February 2: Birth of a Beauty on GMA News TV
- February 2: Meteor Garden (2001; rerun) on Jeepney TV
- February 3: Yesterday (Saturday edition) on DZMM TeleRadyo
- February 3: Business Flight on GMA News TV
- February 9: Wish I May on Fox Filipino
- February 9: Orange Marmalade on Jeepney TV
- February 9: Cedie, Ang Munting Prinsipe (rerun) on Yey!
- February 10: Ang Mahiwagang Baul (rerun) on GMA News TV
- February 11: Knife Fight (season 4) on 2nd Avenue (now defunct)
- February 25: Lethal Weapon (season 1) on Cine Mo!
- February 28: Barrio Kulimlim on Fox Filipino
- March 1: Love in the Moonlight on Jeepney TV
- March 1: NCIS: Los Angeles (season 8) on S+A
- March 2: Nathaniel (rerun) on Jeepney TV
- March 2: Johnny Test on Yey!
- March 3: Warm and Cozy on Jeepney TV
- March 4: Hi! School: Love On on GMA News TV
- March 11: Hell's Kitchen (season 14) on 2nd Avenue
- March 13: The Mysterious Case of Ana Madrigal on Fox Filipino
- March 14: Agimat: Ang Mga Alamat ni Ramon Revilla: Pepeng Agimat (rerun) on Jeepney TV
- March 15: You're the Worst (season 4) on Jack TV
- March 16: That's My Amboy on Fox Filipino
- March 18: Beyond Today on GMA News TV
- March 19: Chuck's World season 1 on 2nd Avenue (now defunct)
- March 19: Shop TV on AksyonTV
- March 22: 9-1-1 (season 1) on 2nd Avenue (now defunct)
- March 23: FPJ: Da King Magpakailanman on Jeepney TV
- March 24: American Crime Story: The Assassination of Gianni Versace on Jack TV
- March 25: Blade Man (rerun) on Cine Mo!
- March 25: News TV All Sports on GMA News TV
- March 25: New Initial D Trilogy on Jeepney TV
- March 28: Shop Japan: Oaklawn Home Shopping on AksyonTV
- March 29: Jordskott (season 1) on 2nd Avenue (now defunct)
- March 30: Because of You on Fox Filipino
- March 30: Metal Fight Beyblade 4D (rerun) and Rascal the Racoon on Yey!
- March 31: Elementary (season 5) on Jack TV
- April 3: The Garfield Show (season 1) on Yey!
- April 4: Case Solved on Fox Filipino
- April 6: Pasada Pelikula on Jeepney TV
- April 8: Kuroko's Basketball season 3 on Yey!
- April 11: America's Next Top Model season 24 on ETC
- April 12: The Magicians (season 2) on ETC
- April 13: My Life as a Teenage Robot (season 2) on Yey!
- April 14: Buhay na Buhay on GMA News TV
- April 15: Team Yey! (season 2) on Yey!
- April 18: The Heart Guy season 1 on 2nd Avenue (now defunct)
- April 19: FlordeLiza on Jeepney TV
- April 19: 2018 MPBL season on S+A
- April 20: Church News Live on INC TV
- April 20: Heard It Through the Grapevine on Jeepney TV
- April 22: Everyday Sarap with CDO on GMA News TV
- April 27: Huwag Ka Lang Mawawala (rerun), My Love Donna (rerun), Pangako Sa 'Yo (2000; rerun) and Walang Hanggan (2012; rerun) on Jeepney TV
- April 28: Pac-Man and the Ghostly Adventures and Sonic X on GMA News TV
- April 29: Hyde Jekyll, Me, JTV Star Showcase and KonoSuba season 1 on Jeepney TV
- April 30: Shades of Blue (season 2) on 2nd Avenue (now defunct)
- May 1: 2018 PBA D-League Aspirants' Cup on AksyonTV
- May 1: Ride with Mr. Wright on Metro Channel
- May 2: LA to Vegas on ETC
- May 4: Poor Señorita on Fox Filipino
- May 4: Ace of Diamond season 1, Remi, Nobody's Girl (rerun), The Loud House season 1 and Yu-Gi-Oh! Zexal season 1 (rerun) on Yey!
- May 5: 2018 PSL Grand Prix Conference on AksyonTV and Hyper
- May 6: Motive (season 4) and Top Chef (season 14) on 2nd Avenue
- May 7: Ayesha's Home Kitchen on Metro Channel
- May 8: Style Queens on Metro Channel
- May 9: This Is Us season 2 on 2nd Avenue
- May 11: The Big Bang Theory season 11 on Jack TV
- May 11: Celebrity Playtime and Honesto (rerun) on Jeepney TV
- May 12: Rated K on ANC
- May 14: Giada in Italy on Metro Channel
- May 15: The Resident (season 1) on 2nd Avenue (now defunct)
- May 18: Arrow (season 6) and Chicago Fire (season 4) on 2nd Avenue
- May 18: Arrow (season 6) on Jack TV
- May 19: Mask on Jeepney TV
- May 19: Free! (rerun) and Halser Acre on Yey!
- May 20: Suits (season 7 on 2nd Avenue
- May 22: American Idol (season 16) on 2nd Avenue, ETC and Sony Channel
- May 22: My Hero Academia season 1 on Yey!
- May 23: New Girl season 7 and The Flash season 4 on ETC
- May 23: The Flash (season 4) on Jack TV
- May 24: Survivor: Ghost Island on Jack TV
- May 25: Starting Gate and The Big Story on Bloomberg TV Philippines (now One News)
- May 25: The Great British Bake-off: Masterclass season 6 on Metro Channel
- May 27: Blindspot (season 3) on 2nd Avenue (now defunct)
- May 27: Autopsy: The Last Hours of... (season 5) on Jack TV
- May 27: Myx VJ Search 2018 on Myx
- May 28: Lucifer (season 2) on 2nd Avenue (now defunct)
- May 28: Suits (season 7) on Jack TV
- May 29: Lucifer (season 3) on Jack TV
- May 30: The Art Show on Metro Channel
- May 31: Modern Family season 9 on 2nd Avenue (now defunct)
- June 1: Everyday Gourmet on Metro Channel
- June 1: The Trapp Family Singers (rerun) on Yey!
- June 2: Juan dela Cruz (rerun) on Jeepney TV
- June 3: Culinary Genius on 2nd Avenue (now defunct)
- June 3: Alamat (rerun) on GMA News TV
- June 4: The Chefs' Line and The Middle season 9 on 2nd Avenue (now defunct)
- June 8: Little Nanay on Fox Filipino
- June 8: A Love to Last, Bridges of Love and Unforgettable Love (rerun) on Jeepney TV
- June 8: Kalye Wars on Sari-Sari Channel
- June 8: Digimon Frontier (rerun) on Yey!
- June 9: On the Wings of Love (rerun) on Jeepney TV
- June 13: America's Next Top Model season 17 on Metro Channel
- June 14: 2018 FIFA World Cup European Qualifiers on Liga/S+A
- June 15: The Millionaire Matchmaker (season 8) on 2nd Avenue (now defunct)
- June 16: The Strain (season 3) and Tyrant (season 3) on 2nd Avenue (now defunct)
- June 17: Star (season 1) on 2nd Avenue (now defunct)
- June 18: Mr Selfridge (season 3) on 2nd Avenue (now defunct)
- June 18: Star (season 2) on ETC
- June 18: Bob's Burgers season 8, Family Guy season 17 and The Simpsons season 29 on Jack TV
- June 19: Supergirl season 3 on ETC and Jack TV
- June 20: Rectify (season 3) on 2nd Avenue (now defunct)
- June 22: My Hero Academia season 2 on Yey!
- June 23: The Screening Room on 2nd Avenue (now defunct)
- June 23: American Horror Story: Cult season 7 on Jack TV
- June 24: Royal Pains (season 7) on 2nd Avenue (now defunct)
- June 24: 800 Words (season 1) on ETC
- June 25: Black Work on 2nd Avenue (now defunct)
- June 29: Entertainment Tonight, The Ellen DeGeneres Show season 15, Inside Edition and Shop TV on 2nd Avenue (now defunct)
- June 29: Mamaw-in-Law on GMA News TV
- June 29: Gordon Ramsay's Ultimate Cookery Course on Metro Channel
- June 29: Judy Abbott (rerun) on Yey!
- June 30: The Color of Passion on Telenovela Channel
- July 1: Mirror of the Witch on GMA News TV
- July 1: Free! - Eternal Summer (rerun) on Yey!
- July 5: Empire season 4 and NCIS season 13 on Jack TV
- July 6: Kung Ako'y Iiwan Mo on Jeepney TV
- July 6: Dennis the Menace (rerun) on Yey!
- July 8: Odd Mom Out (season 2) on ETC
- July 13: 100 Days to Heaven (rerun) on Jeepney TV
- July 13: My Life as a Teenage Robot on Yey!
- July 20: Ikaw Lamang and Katorse (rerun) on Jeepney TV
- July 22: Yu-Gi-Oh! Arc-V season 1 on Jeepney TV
- July 23: I Live with Models (season 2) on Jack TV
- July 24: Pinoy M.D. on GMA News TV
- July 25: Person of Interest season 5 on Jack TV
- July 26: Project Runway: Fashion Startup on ETC
- July 26: Wish Ko Lang! on GMA News TV
- July 27: Follow Your Heart on GMA News TV
- July 27: Peter Pan and Wendy (rerun) on Yey!
- July 28: 2018 PSL Invitational Cup on AksyonTV and Hyper
- July 30: Karelasyon on Fox Filipino
- July 31: Danny Phantom (season 1) on Yey!
- August 2: Project Runway (season 16) on ETC
- August 5: Who Do You Think You Are? (season 6) on Jack TV
- August 10: Digimon Savers (rerun) on Yey!
- August 17: Orange Marmalade on Asianovela Channel
- August 17: Mukha on DZMM Teleradyo
- August 19: Funny Ka, Pare Ko (season 5), NCIS: Los Angeles (season 7) and Taken (season 1) on Cine Mo!
- August 21: Naruto: Shippuden (season 3) on Yey!
- August 23: Code Black (season 3) on Sony Channel
- August 24: Sensory Couple on Asianovela Channel
- August 26: Culinary Genius US on ETC
- August 26: Your Face Sounds Familiar Kids season 2 on Yey!
- August 31: Goblin, Love in the Moonlight, Oh! My Lady, Uncontrollably Fond and Woman with a Suitcase on Asianovela Channel
- August 31: The Rose of Guadalupe on Telenovela Channel
- August 31: Langit Lupa on Jeepney TV
- September 2: Sirkus on GMA News TV
- September 2: Princess and I (rerun) on Jeepney TV
- September 4: The Ellen DeGeneres Show (season 15) and TMZ on TV on ETC
- September 7: Class 3C Has a Secret (season 2) on Sari-Sari Channel
- September 7: Extra on ETC
- September 7: Nutri Ventures (rerun) on Yey!
- September 12: 2018 Premier Volleyball League Collegiate Conference on Liga and S+A
- September 14: Saimdang: Soulmates Across Time on GMA News TV
- September 14: My Heart is Yours on Telenovela Channel
- September 14: Anne of Green Gables on Yey!
- September 15: Forevermore (rerun) on Jeepney TV
- September 16: The Final Pitch on CNN Philippines
- September 16: Inside the Actors Studio (season 21) on Jack TV
- September 20: Suits season 8 on Diva and Jack TV
- September 21: Blindspot (season 1) on AksyonTV
- September 21: On the Way to the Airport on Asianovela Channel
- September 21: Familia Zaragoza (rerun) and Mga Anghel na Walang Langit (rerun) on Jeepney TV
- September 22: Bridges of Love (rerun) on Jeepney TV
- September 22: Brush on Sari-Sari Channel
- September 24: The Odd Couple (season 3) on Jack TV
- September 28: Bubble Gum and Warm and Cozy on Asianovela Channel
- September 28: Destiny Rose on Fox Filipino
- September 28: Mutya (rerun) and Rubi (rerun) on Jeepney TV
- October 1: O Shopping on BEAM TV
- October 5: The K2 and Weightlifting Fairy on Asianovela Channel
- October 5: Carrossel on Telenovela Channel
- October 5: Adventures of Sonic the Hedgehog (rerun) on Yey!
- October 7: 800 Words (season 2) on ETC
- October 7: Chibi Maruko-chan (TV drama) on GMA News TV
- October 12: Legend of the Blue Sea and The King is in Love on Asianovela Channel
- October 12: Pretty Woman on GMA News TV
- October 12: MasterChef U.S. season 9 on Metro Channel
- October 12: Danny Phantom, Marcelino Pan y Vino (rerun) and Si Mary at ang Lihim na Hardin (rerun) on Yey!
- October 13: Are You the One season 5 on ETC
- October 14: #killerpost on Jack TV
- October 14: Power Rangers Samurai (rerun) on Yey!
- October 16: iZombie (season 4) on ETC
- October 18: Pisobilities on GMA News TV
- October 19: Prison Break season 1 on AksyonTV
- October 19: The Half Sisters on Fox Filipino
- October 19: Tayong Dalawa (rerun) on Jeepney TV
- October 20: The Heart Guy season 1 on ETC
- October 21: Hashtag Pinoy and Kids HQ on GMA News TV
- October 22: Ismol Family on Fox Filipino
- October 22: Saturday Night Live season 42 on Jack TV
- October 26: High Society and My Love Donna on Asianovela Channel
- October 26: Family Feud (3rd incarnation), Kay Tagal Kang Hinintay and Momay (rerun) on Jeepney TV
- October 26: Naruto: Shippuden season 4 on Yey!
- October 27: Cooking Master Boy on Yey!
- October 28: Heroman (rerun) and Little Big Shots with Steve Harvey (season 1) on Yey!
- November 2: A Love So Beautiful and I am Not a Robot on Asianovela Channel
- November 2: Koreana on Fox Filipino
- November 9: My Dearest Intruder on Asianovela Channel
- November 9: Bride of the Water God on GMA News TV
- November 9: Princess Sarah (2007; rerun) on Jeepney TV
- November 9: Samurai X (rerun) on Yey!
- November 10: Teka Muna on DZMM TeleRadyo
- November 10: The Originals season 5 on ETC
- November 11: The Kids' Choice on Yey!
- November 12: Famous in Love (season 2) and Life Sentence on ETC
- November 16: Supergirl season 1 on AksyonTV
- November 16: W on Asianovela Channel
- November 16: Princess Sarah (1985; rerun) and Remi, Nobody's Girl (rerun) on Yey!
- November 17: Songhits Tunog Pinoy on DZMM TeleRadyo
- November 17: Family Rosary Crusade on S+A
- November 18: DC's Legends of Tomorrow season 3 on Jack TV
- November 18: One-Punch Man season 1 on Yey!
- November 23: Hwarang on Asianovela Channel
- November 23: Digimon Xros Wars on Yey!
- November 25: BeyWheelz (rerun) on Yey!
- November 26: Giada Entertains on Metro Channel
- November 30: Mask on Asianovela Channel
- November 30: Pasión de Amor (rerun) on Jeepney TV
- November 30: Harvey Beaks (season 2) and Major (season 1 to 6; rerun) on Yey!
- December 1: Uniporme on GMA News TV
- December 6: Spartan: Ultimate Team Challenge (season 2) on Jack TV
- December 7: My Time With You on Asianovela Channel
- December 7: Alyas Robin Hood season 1 and Little Star on Fox Filipino
- December 7: Jewel in the Palace on GMA News TV
- December 7: Mara Clara (2010; rerun) and Pusong Ligaw on Jeepney TV
- December 8: 2018 Premier Volleyball League Open Conference on Liga and S+A
- December 9: Top Chef (season 14) on ETC
- December 14: Blade Man and Hyde Jekyll, Me on Asianovela Channel
- December 14: 2018 Spikers' Turf Open Conference on Hyper
- December 14: Sana Bukas pa ang Kahapon on Jeepney TV
- December 14: Job Order on Sari-Sari Channel
- December 14: Little Women II (rerun) on Yey!
- December 15: Annaliza (rerun) and Bagito (rerun) on Jeepney TV
- December 15: Blue Jeans on Sari-Sari Channel
- December 20: Survivor: David vs. Goliath on Jack TV
- December 20: Spanish and Sexy on Metro Channel
- December 21: Love in the Moonlight (rerun) and Sensory Couple (rerun) on Asianovela Channel
- December 21: Cinderella and the Four Knights on GMA News TV
- December 21: I Don't Trust Men Anymore (rerun) on Telenovela Channel
- December 23: Star Hunt: The Grand Audition Show on Jeepney TV
- December 23: BeyWarriors: BeyRaiderz (rerun) and Power Rangers S.P.D. (rerun) on Yey!
- December 26: Royal Pains (season 7) on Jack TV
- December 28: Sorpresaya on Cine Mo!
- December 28: Give Love on Christmas (rerun) and My Dear Heart on Jeepney TV
- December 28: Digimon Adventure tri. (Part 1 to 3), My Hero Academia (seasons 1 and 2; rerun) and The Adventures of Jimmy Neutron, Boy Genius on Yey!
- December 30: Ultimate Fighting Championship on Hyper
- December 30: The Best of The Sharon Cuneta Show on Jeepney TV
- December 30: The Fairly OddParents season 9 on Yey!
- December 31: Shop TV on BEAM TV
- December 31: Myx Daily Top 10 International Edition and Myx Daily Top 10 Pinoy Edition on Myx

==== Unknown (dates) ====
- ETC Flix on ETC

==== Stopped airing ====
- January 27/April 28: Born to Be Wild (old episodes) on GMA News TV
- March 2: 100% Pinoy! (rerun) (reason: program replaced by Everyday Sarap with CDO) on GMA News TV
- April 15: Biyahe ni Drew (Sunday replay) on GMA News TV
- April 29: iJuander (Sunday replay) on GMA News TV
- May 7–18: Mamaw-in-Law on GMA News TV (reason: Program pre-empted by 700 Club Asia live telethon TV special.)
- May 19: Wagas on GMA News TV (reason: Program pre-empted by Harry and Meghan: The Royal Wedding)
- May 26: In Touch with Dr. Charles Stanley on GMA News TV
- July 8/August 11: One Day, Isang Araw (rerun) on GMA News TV
- August 5: Tunay na Buhay (Sunday replay) on GMA News TV
- August 13–24: Saimdang: Soulmates Across Time on GMA News TV (reason: Program pre-empted by 700 Club Asia live telethon TV special.)
- September 2: ASAP: Encore on Jeepney TV (reason: Program replaced by Star Hunt: The Grand Audition Show encore. The program continued on January 6, 2019.)
- September 9: Jesus the Healer and Kids HQ on GMA News TV (Reason: pre-empted by Miss Tourism Philippines)
- September 24: Wagas (Monday replay) on GMA News TV
- September 25: Good News Kasama si Vicky Morales (Tuesday replay) on GMA News TV
- September 26: Brigada (Wednesday replay) on GMA News TV
- September 28: Investigative Documentaries (Friday replay) on GMA News TV
- October 16: Jesus the Healer (Monday late night) on GMA News TV (reason: program replaced by Road Trip Monday late night)
- October 17: Solemn Sesions on GMA News TV (reason: program replaced by Midnight Prayer Helps Tuesday late night)
- October 18: This is My Story, This is My Song on GMA News TV (reason: program replaced by Road Trip Thursday late night)
- October 19: PJM Forum (Thursday late night) on GMA News TV (reason: program replaced by Light Up Thursday morning)
- October 20: I Love Pinas (Friday late night) on GMA News TV (reason: program replaced by Light Up)
- October 21: Lifegiver (Sunday late night) on GMA News TV (reason: program replaced by Jesus the Healer)
- November 25: Adventure Time on CNN Philippines (reason: Season 1 run only. Program replaced by Wholesome Meals, Better Life. Program continued on February 2, 2019.)

=== Video streaming services ===
- February 2: The Good Place season 2 on Iflix
- March 15: Channel Zero (season 3) on Iflix
- May 24: Star (season 2) on Iflix
- August 9: Reverie on Iflix
- November 1: Channel Zero (season 4) on Iflix
- December 29: Midnight, Texas (season 2) on Iflix

== Networks ==
The following are a list of free-to-air and cable channels or networks launches and closures in 2018.

=== Launches ===
Date	Station	Channel	Source
January 1	Blue Ant Entertainment	Sky Cable Channel 53 SD / Channel 196 HD (Metro Manila); Cablelink Channel 37 SD / Channel 313 HD; Sky Direct Channel 35 SD (Nationwide)	
January 1	Blue Ant Extreme	Sky Cable Channel 104 SD / Channel 209 HD (Metro Manila); Cablelink Channel 31 SD / Channel 219 HD	
January 1	Liga	Sky Cable Channel 86 SD / Channel 183 HD (Metro Manila) & Channel 308 SD / Channel 757 HD (Provincial); Sky Direct Channel 48 (before), 14 (after) SD	
January 15	Social TV	DTT Channel 55.02 (Metro Manila)	
February 1	EDGEsport	Sky Cable Channel 218 SD / Channel 188 HD (Metro Manila)	
February 1	Fight Sports	Sky Cable Channel 187 HD (Metro Manila)	
May 16	Oras ng Himala TV (now Oras ng Himala Channel)	Sky Cable Channel 114 SD (Metro Manila)	
May 25	Gone Viral TV	EasyTV Home Channel 5 (Metro Manila)	
May 25	ZooMoo	EasyTV Home Channel 9 (Metro Manila)	
May 25	K-Plus	EasyTV Home Channel 11 (Metro Manila)	
May 25	Boo	EasyTV Home Channel 15 (Metro Manila)	
June 1	Miao Mi	Sky Cable Channel 118 SD (Metro Manila)	
July 30	Asianovela Channel	DTT Channel 16.02; ABS-CBN TV Plus Channel 9 (Metro Manila)	
July 30	Movie Central	DTT Channel 16.03; ABS-CBN TV Plus Channel 10 (Metro Manila)	
September 16	Pop Life TV	DTT Channel 32.07 (Metro Manila)	

=== Stations changing network affiliation ===
The following is a list of television stations that have made or will make noteworthy affiliation switches in 2018.

Date	Station	Channel	Prior affiliation	New affiliation	Notes	Source
June 5	DZRJ-TV	29	2nd Avenue	RJTV	On June 5, 2nd Avenue ceased its broadcast operations due to the termination of affiliation deal between Solar Entertainment Corporation and Rajah Broadcasting Network after 10 years. Immediately after, RJTV returned to independent broadcasting with migration into digital broadcast, becoming the second broadcaster to completely switch off its analog transmission.	

=== Rebranded ===
The following is a list of cable channels that have made or will make noteworthy network rebranded in 2018.

Date	Rebranded from	Rebranded to	Channel	Source
February 12	Light Network	Light TV (2nd incarnation)	Channel 33 (digital feed); Cablelink Channel 77 (Metro Manila); Cignal Channel 183 (Nationwide); Destiny Cable Channel 83 (Nationwide); Sky Cable Channel 215 (Metro Manila) / Channel 5 (Laguna) / Channel 48 (Cavite); Sky Direct Channel 41 (Nationwide)	
April 2	Lifestyle	Metro Channel	Sky Cable Channel 52 SD / Channel 174 HD (Metro Manila); Sky Direct Channel 31 SD (Nationwide)	
May 28	Bloomberg TV Philippines	One News	Cignal Channel 8 SD / Channel 259 HD (Nationwide); Cablelink Channel 23 SD (Metro Manila); SatLite Channel 60 SD (Nationwide)	

=== Closures ===
Date	Station	Channel	Sign-on debut	Source
January 15	ABS-CBN Regional Channel	Sky Cable Channel 4 (Metro Manila, Rizal, Cavite, Laguna, Bulacan and Davao); Sky Direct Channel 14 (Nationwide)	August 1, 2016	
January 15	Tag	Sky Cable Channel 77 (Metro Manila); Sky Direct Channel 44 (Nationwide)	October 19, 2016	
February 1	Hero	Sky Cable Channel 3 & 44 (Metro Manila) / Channel 106 (Provincial); Destiny Cable Channel 3 & 44 (Metro Manila)	October 1, 2005	
March 31	Toonami Asia	Sky Cable Channel 42 SD (Metro Manila); Cablelink Channel 214 SD (Metro Manila); Sky Direct Channel 16 SD (Nationwide); Cignal Channel 75 SD (Nationwide)	December 1, 2012	
March 31	Shop Japan: Oaklawn Home Shopping	Cignal Channel 33 (Nationwide); Various programs on other local TV networks	2015	
April 1	Lifestyle	Sky Cable Channel 52 SD (Metro Manila); Sky Direct Channel 31 SD (Nationwide)	July 24, 1999	
May 27	Bloomberg TV Philippines	Cignal Channel 8 SD / Channel 259 HD (Nationwide); Cablelink Channel 23 SD (Metro Manila); SatLite Channel 60 SD (Nationwide)	October 1, 2015	
June 5 (Free-to-air); June 30 (Provincial)	2nd Avenue	RJTV Channel 29 (analog feed) / Channel 30 (DTT); Sky Cable Channel 19 (Metro Manila); Cablelink Channel 35 (Metro Manila); Cignal Channel 28 (Nationwide); SatLite Channel 29 (Nationwide)	December 15, 2005	
September 30	Sports Illustrated TV	Sky Cable Channel 83 (SD) / Channel 177 (HD) (Metro Manila)	May 15, 2016	
December 31	AMC	Sky Cable Channel 106 (Metro Manila); Cablelink Channel 50 (Metro Manila); Cignal Channel 56 (Nationwide); SatLite Channel 72 (Nationwide); G Sat Channel 87 (Nationwide)	January 1, 2015	
December 31	Turner Classic Movies	Sky Cable Channel 105 (Metro Manila)	2005	
December 31	truTV	Cignal Channel 122 (Nationwide)	April 1, 2010	
December 31	MTVph	Channel 22 (DTT); EasyTV Home Channel 4 (Metro Manila); Cablelink Channel 42 (Metro Manila); Cignal Channel 151 (Nationwide); Sky Cable / Destiny Cable Channel 71 (Metro Manila); Sky Direct Channel 45 (Nationwide)	August 1, 2017	

== Awards ==
- October 14: 32nd PMPC Star Awards for Television, organized by Philippine Movie Press Club

== Births ==
- February 8: Gian Luca Geroue, actor
- February 23: Graciela Elyse Arcilla, actress
- May 17: Argus Aspiras, television personality, actor and singer
- August 28: Janell Gonzaga, actress
- December 25: Misha Meiko Kobayashi, actress

== Deaths ==
January

- January 14 – Spanky Manikan (b. 1942), actor
- January 27 – Maryo J. de los Reyes (b. 1952), film and television director

February

- February 7 – Argel Joseph, (b. 1943), film and television director

March

- March 8 – Bernardo Bernardo (b. 1945), actor
- March 15 – Rolly Quizon (b. 1958), actor, former cast member of John en Marsha and son of the late comedy icon, Dolphy
- March 24 – Mely Tagasa (b. 1935), actress and comedian

August

- August 19 – Christopher Ad Castillo (b. 1964), movie and television director

October

- October 10 – Manolito Cruz, President and CEO, IBC-13
- October 30 – Rico J. Puno (b. 1953), singer and actor

November

- November 6 – Bangkay (b. 1947), actor
- November 19 - Julius Caesar Planton (b. 1975), former Tanauan, Batangas Mayor and a former wife of Lindsay Custodio
- November 21 - TJ Cruz (b. 1981), former mainstay of Ang TV and son of film/TV actor, Tirso Cruz III

December

- December 14 - Gilberto Duavit Sr. (b. 1934), chairman, GMA Network

== See also ==
- 2018 in television
