= Grami's Circus Show =

South Korean television series

- Hangul: 그라미의 서커스 쇼
- RR: Geuramiui seokeoseu syo
- MR: Kŭramiŭi sŏk'ŏsŭ syo
- Genre: Slapstick comedy
- Written by: Hyeonjung Lee; Seungmin Lee; Changhwan Shin
- Directed by: Changhwan Shin
- Country of origin: South Korea
- Original language: None
- No. of seasons: 2
- No. of episodes: 20 (71 segments)

Production
- Executive producers: Changhwan Shin; Joongmin Park
- Producers: Hana Kim; Eunee Park; Gihyuck Yoon
- Editor: Kihing Gil
- Running time: 5 minutes
- Production companies: Studio Gale; KBS Media

Original release
- Network: KBS1
- Release: 2012 – 2017

Grami's Circus Show (Korean: 그라미의 서커스 쇼; RR: Geuramiui seokeoseu syo) is a South Korean slapstick comedy 3D animated television series produced by Studio Gale. It aired on KBS1 and is available on Netflix.

== Synopsis ==
Grami, Nemo and Sam, a trio of three lions and a ringmaster Jack train for and perform their circus show.

== Characters ==
=== Main characters ===
- Grami (voiced by Yeo Min-jeong): Grami is the title character of the show. He's a lion cub who is very optimistic, never takes anything seriously and never gets upset or sad.
- Jack (voiced by Seok-pil Choi): Jack is a strict, dignified and hot-tempered ringmaster who wants to get rich by performing circus shows with lions.
- Nemo (voiced by Seok-pil Choi): Nemo is a lion who came from Africa. He's jealous of Grami. He's dumb, bossy and only uses his power to solve problems. He always wants to gain recognition from Jack.
- Sam (voiced by Um Sang-hyun and Jeon Tae-yeol): Sam is a weakling lion who used to live in a zoo. Nemo picks on Sam since Sam is tenderhearted and weak. He always wants to relax and sleep.

=== Recurring characters ===
- Baboo (voiced by Seok-pil Choi): Baboo is a baboon who is working as an intern at the circus.
- Rabbits (voiced by Kim Hyeon-ji): Rabbits are the audience of the circus show.

== Crew ==
- Director: Chang Hwan Shin
- Writers: Heong Myeong Choe Chang Hwan Shin
- Producers: Eunee Park, Jun Oh and Yu Kyung Lee
- Executive Producers: Chang Hwan Shin
- Supervising Animator: Ki Hong Gil
- Art Director: Seung Min Lee
- Story Board: Hyeon Myeong Choe, Hye Lim Chun and Seung Min Lee
- Animator: Eun Hee Jung and Gwang Hyun Jung
- Modeling: Kwang Il Ahn
- Lighting Supervisor: Young Suk Kim
- Lighting: Suk Jin Kim, Tae Hwan No, Jun Ho Kim and Hyoung Mo Cho
- Composite: Min Hyeong Chang
- Music By: Mint Condition
- Sound Design: Ji Hee Kim
- Recording & Mixing: Hee Jung Kang

== Episodes ==
=== Series overview ===
Series	Segments	Episodes	Originally released		
Series	Segments	Episodes	First released	Last released	Network
1	44	11	18 March 2012	26 July 2014	KBS 1
2	27	9	21 January 2017		Netflix

=== Season 1 ===
No.	Segments	Original release date
1	"Juggling" (1a)	TBA
1	"Tightrope" (1b)	TBA
1	"Grami & Jack" (1c)	TBA
1	"Grami as a Baby Bird" (1d)	TBA
"Juggling":Grami and Nemo have a juggling contest. "Tightrope": Nemo chases Grami across a tightrope. "Grami & Jack": Jack has problems with a ladder. "Grami as a Baby Bird": Grami is very hungry and sees a bird nest. He tries to get in the nest but the mother bird chases him away. He tries again, this time wearing a baby bird costume. A snake tries to attack the nest but Grami beats up the snake. The snake attacks again but Grami punches the snake away, but breaks an egg in the process. The mother bird and other baby birds beat Grami and throw him out of the nest.
2	"A Magic Box" (2a)	TBA
2	"A Merry Go Round" (2b)	TBA
2	"Baboo" (2c)	TBA
2	"A Rainy Day" (2d)	TBA
"A Magic Box": A magic box splits Nemo in half. "A Merry Go Round": Grami rides a strange merry-go-round. "Baboo": Baboo joins the circus. "A Rainy Day": A thunderstorm causes big leaks under the big top.
3	"Gladiator" (3a)	TBA
3	"A Voodoo Doll" (3b)	TBA
3	"Throwing Stars" (3c)	TBA
3	"Gomtang, the Courier" (3d)	TBA
"Gladiator": The lions become gladiators. "A Voodoo Doll": Baboo stumbles across a voodoo doll. "Throwing Stars": Jack discovers that Sam is very talented with throwing stars and starts a new show with him where Jack puts apples on his head and Sam aims at the apples without hurting Jack. Sam remembers all atrocities Jack committed on him and knowingly misses his target. "Gomtang, the Courier": A special delivery puts Nemo on edge.
4	"Moses Basket" (4a)	TBA
4	"Pair Skating" (4b)	TBA
4	"Gomtang Band" (4c)	TBA
4	"The Grim Reaper" (4d)	TBA
"Moses Basket": Jack asks Grami to babysit. "Pair Skating": The lions put on an ice skating show. "Gomtang Band": Imaginary instruments inspires real rock music. "The Grim Reaper": The Grim Reaper visits Jack but Jack is ready and starts beating Grim Reaper. Grami snatches the bone which is hanging around Grim Reaper's neck. Grim Reaper switches clothes with Nemo and Jack mistakenly beats Nemo up. The Grim Reaper takes Grami away instead of Jack.
5	"The Swan Lake" (5a)	TBA
5	"Lightning" (5b)	TBA
5	"An Excalibur" (5c)	TBA
5	"A Match Boy" (5d)	TBA
"The Swan Lake": The circus performs "Swan Lake." "Lightning": A storm livens things up. "An Excalibur": A legendary sword causes turmoil. "A Match Boy": Grami goes begging in the streets.
6	"Hello, Nancy" (6a)	TBA
6	"Love Story" (6b)	TBA
6	"A Horrible Vacation" (6c)	TBA
6	"About Nancy" (6d)	TBA
"Hello, Nancy": The circus gets a puppy, but she isn't as harmless as she looks. "Love Story": Grami hides from his new admirer. "A Horrible Vacation": A vacation goes wrong. "About Nancy": Nancy becomes very rich.
7	"Chameleon" (7a)	TBA
7	"A Treadmill" (7b)	TBA
7	"Astronauts" (7c)	TBA
7	"Horang, The Sergeant Tiger" (7d)	TBA
"Chameleon": Nemo finds a chameleon. The chameleon bites Nemo and he gets the colour changing power of chameleon. He plays tricks on his friends using his powers, but he can't control his instinct to eat a fly, gets caught and loses his powers. Others beat him up. "A Treadmill": The lions try out a treadmill. "Astronauts": The lions undergo astronaut training. "Horang, The Sergeant Tiger": A new and tough trainer arrives.
8	"Guitar Players" (8a)	TBA
8	"A Toilet" (8b)	TBA
8	"A Rubber Duck" (8c)	TBA
8	"Three Lion Cubs" (8d)	TBA
"Guitar Players": Grami and Nemo play music. "A Toilet": The lions get a bathroom lesson. "A Rubber Duck": Bath toys go berserk. "Three Lion Cubs": The lions learn about when they were cubs.
9	"Escape from Watertank" (9a)	TBA
9	"My Lovely Chick" (9b)	TBA
9	"A Ring of Fire" (9c)	TBA
9	"Alarm Clocks" (9d)	TBA
"Escape from Watertank": Nemo struggles to escape from a water tank. "My Lovely Chick": Grami tries to protect a chick. "A Ring of Fire": The lions jump from a ring of fire. "Alarm Clocks": New alarm clocks make sleep difficult.
10	"Jack and the Beanstalk" (10a)	TBA
10	"Pro-Wrestling" (10b)	TBA
10	"Blowing out Candles" (10c)	TBA
10	"Peter Sam" (10d)	TBA
"Jack and the Beanstalk": Jack climbs a beanstalk and finds a giant Grami. "Pro-Wrestling": The lions try out pro wrestling. Blowing out Candles: Nemo has trouble blowing out candles. "Peter Sam": The lions put on a play.
11	"Kung-Fu Fighting" (11a)	TBA
11	"Fists of Fury" (11b)	TBA
11	"A Trapeze" (11c)	TBA
11	"Circus Hero" (11d)	TBA

=== Season 2 ===
No.	Segments	Original release date
1	"A Little Armadillo" (1a)	TBA
1	"Nemo in a Swamp" (1b)	TBA
1	"A Monster Plant" (1c)	TBA
2	"A Mosquito" (2a)	TBA
2	"Captain of the Vine" (2b)	TBA
2	"Hula Hoop Show" (2c)	TBA
"A Mosquito": Grami finds a mosquito.
3	"Jungle Fishing" (3a)	TBA
3	"Cork, the Baby Elephant" (3b)	TBA
3	"Spider's Revenge" (3c)	TBA
4	"King of the Jungle" (4a)	TBA
4	"Hiccups" (4b)	TBA
4	"Strange Vines" (4c)	TBA
5	"Jungle Musicians" (5a)	TBA
5	"Bananas" (5b)	TBA
5	"A Magic Trunk" (5c)	TBA
6	"Ice Climbing" (6a)	TBA
6	"A Freezing Day" (6b)	TBA
6	"Jack's Nightmare" (6c)	TBA
7	"Flying Kites" (7a)	TBA
7	"Ice Sculpture" (7b)	TBA
7	"Saving the Bonfire" (7c)	TBA
8	"Grami as a Circus Master" (8a)	TBA
8	"A Baby Harp Seal" (8b)	TBA
8	"A Despicable Penguin" (8c)	TBA
9	"Grami, the Superhero 1" (9a)	TBA
9	"Grami, the Superhero 2" (9b)	TBA
9	"Christmas Gifts" (9c)	TBA

== Reception ==
=== Critical response ===
Stuart Heritage of The Guardian wrote, "I have to hold my hands up here and admit that I'm slightly obsessed with Grami's Circus Show. I boggle at the audacity of it. It is so spectacularly inappropriate that watching it is like picking a scab. Watching it with a toddler, as I've done by accident, is like playing chicken with object permanence; it's fun in the moment, but the second any of it sinks in is the moment we're all screwed."

=== Accolades ===
In 2014, the series won a Pulcinella award in the category of "TV Series for Teen", being the only Asian show to do so in that year. The show was also in the official selections for the SICAF awards but didn't win.

Year	Award	Category	Result	Ref.
2012	Supertoon Award	Films for Children and Youth	Nominated	
2012	Annecy Award	TV films	Nominated	
2012	Stuttgart Award	Cartoons for Teens	Nominated	
2014	SICAF Award	SICAF Kid	Nominated	
2014	Pulcinella Award	TV series for Teen	Won	
2015	Asian Television Award	Best 3D Animated Programme	Won	
