= Pareng Partners =

Philippine television program

- Title card
- Genre: News magazine Documentary
- Presented by: Anthony Taberna; Jorge Cariño
- Country of origin: Philippines
- Original language: Filipino
- No. of episodes: 34

Production
- Running time: 1 hour
- Production company: ABS-CBN News and Current Affairs

Original release
- Network: ABS-CBN
- Release: July 28, 2018 – March 23, 2019

Pareng Partners is a Philippine television documentary show broadcast by ABS-CBN. Hosted by Anthony Taberna and Jorge Cariño, it aired on the network's Yes Weekend line up from July 28, 2018 to March 23, 2019, replacing Kapamilya Blockbusters: Sabado Thriller and was replaced by DocuCentral Presents.

== Hosts ==
- Anthony Taberna
- Jorge Cariño

== Typhoon Ompong Special coverage ==
On September 15, 2018, on the day Typhoon Ompong (Mangkhut) struck Northern Luzon, Pareng Partners aired a Special Coverage live from the ABS-CBN News Studio, serving as lead-in to TV Patrol Weekend as it uses the latter's graphics. This coverage was hosted by Jorge Cariño and joined by TV Patrol Weekend co-anchor Alvin Elchico.

== See also ==
- List of programs broadcast by ABS-CBN
