= Showbiz Pa More! =

Philippine television program

- Title card
- Genre: Talk show
- Written by: Sheiden Dela Cruz
- Directed by: Jose Mari Reyes
- Presented by: Jhai Ho
- Country of origin: Philippines
- Original language: Filipino
- No. of seasons: 4
- No. of episodes: 169

Production
- Executive producer: Jeanette Monica Valdez
- Producers: HD de Chavez; Roselle Mariano
- Production locations: ABS-CBN Broadcasting Center, Diliman, Quezon City
- Camera setup: Multiple-camera setup
- Running time: 60 minutes
- Production company: ABS-CBN Entertainment

Original release
- Network: Jeepney TV (May 6, 2018 – February 28, 2021); Kapamilya Online Live (August 2, 2020 – February 28, 2021)
- Release: May 6, 2018 – February 28, 2021

Showbiz Pa More! is a Philippine television talk show broadcast by Jeepney TV. Directed by Jose Mari Reyes, it is hosted by DJ Jhai Ho, it premiered on May 6, 2018. The show concluded on February 28, 2021 with a total of 169 episodes.

== Host ==
- Jhai Ho

== Production ==
- Cindy de Leon, Channel Head
- Katia Montenegro Pla, Brand Head
- Jeanette Monica Valdez, Executive Producer
- Albert Abesamis, Creative Head
- Madonna Carcer, Segment Producer
- Jennifer Mijares, Anna Mae Bag-ao, Researcher

== Incidents ==
=== Earthquake interrupted Toni Gonzaga's interview ===
On 2019 Luzon earthquake, Jhai Ho was shocked after the interview with Gonzaga in ABS-CBN Compound and prays for safety.
