= Mark Lopez (Filipino executive) =

Chairman of ABS-CBN Corporation (born 1972)

Chairman, ABS-CBN (Broadcasting) Corporation
- Incumbent
- Assumed office April 18, 2018
- Preceded by: Eugenio Lopez III

Personal details
- Born: Martin Lagdameo Lopez; August 12, 1972 (age 54) Manila, Philippines
- Spouse: Connie Lopez
- Children: Martina Lopez
- Parents: Manuel M. Lopez; Maria Teresa B. Lagdameo
- Education: Menlo College; Asian Institute of Management
- Occupation: Chairman, ABS-CBN Corporation

Martin "Mark" Lagdameo Lopez (born August 12, 1972) is a Filipino media executive who is the chairman of the Philippine media company ABS-CBN Corporation, with investments primarily in television, radio, cable telecommunications, and film production.

== Education ==
Lopez completed INSEAD’s general management program in 2017, received his Executive Masters in Business Administration degree from the Asian Institute of Management in 2003, and earned his bachelor’s degree in Business Administration from Menlo College, California in 1994.

== Career ==
Before joining ABS-CBN, Lopez was the vice president and chief information officer of Manila Electric Company (Meralco). He also served as president of e-Meralco Ventures Inc until 2010. He joined ABS-CBN as its chief technology officer. As chief technology officer, he set the company’s strategic directions and ensured operational excellence in information and communications, and technology broadcast engineering.

Lopez was elected chairman on April 18, 2018, succeeding his cousin Eugenio "Gabby" Lopez III, who served as chairman since 1997. On October 2, 2020, Lopez was elected vice-chairman of López Holdings Corporation.

Business positions
Preceded by Eugenio Lopez III	ABS-CBN Corporation Chairman; 2018 – present	Incumbent
