= Nutri Ventures =

Portuguese animated television series

- Also known as: Nutri Ventures – The Quest for the 7 Kingdoms
- Genre: Adventure; Science fantasy; Comedy; Educational
- Created by: Watermelon
- Directed by: Rodrigo Carvalho
- Voices of: English dub: Antonio Amadeo; Aubrey Shavonn; Barry Tarallo; Betsy Graver; James Keller; Lela Elam; Mark Wells; Nicole Mitchell; Oscar Cheda; Rita Wells; Scott Genn; Scott Wilson; Todd Durkin; Wayne Legett
- Theme music composer: Simon Wadsworth; Rodrigo Carvalho; João Ramos
- Opening theme: "Nutri Ventures Theme"; By Paula Teixeira
- Country of origin: Portugal
- Original language: Portuguese
- No. of seasons: 5
- No. of episodes: 52

Production
- Executive producers: Rui Lima Miranda; Rodrigo Carvalho; Pedro Van Zeller
- Producer: Nutri Ventures SA
- Running time: 24 minutes
- Production companies: Nutri Ventures Corporation; Radio and Television of Portugal

Original release
- Network: RTP2
- Release: 26 September 2012 – 18 April 2014

Nutri Ventures (also known as Nutri Ventures – The Quest for the 7 Kingdoms, Portuguese: Nutri Ventures – Em Busca dos 7 Reinos) is a Portuguese animated television series produced by the Nutri Ventures Corporation and Rádio e Televisão de Portugal and is distributed through Hulu Kids.

== Synopsis ==
Young heroes Theo, Lena, Ben, and Nina go on a mission to discover food-group kingdoms in this animated series. Traveling from kingdom to kingdom, the heroes discover the nutripowers of the lost foods that they rescue. Their goal is to bring healthy food back to their city, where supervillain Alex Grand makes sure that no food exists. With childhood obesity on the rise, "Nutri Ventures" aims to create a positive message about healthy eating for young people.

== Characters ==
=== Main ===
- Theo is the leader of the main group. He keeps the medallion with him.
- Lena is the most intelligent of the group. She keeps the NutriPad with her to level nutrition on people.
- Ben is fat and has a crush on Inca.
- Nina is playful and cute. She is Theo's younger sister.
- Alex Grand is the main antagonist of the series. The president of the Unhealthy Food Grand Corporation, he replaced all the food in the world with a food-like product called "Genex 100".
- Murdock was Alex's elderly father, who had a vision of Theo saving the food.
- Nose is Alex's second-in-command.
- Nexus is the leader of the seven Guardians.
- The Gugas are small and spherical bulldog-like creatures. The purple one usually accompanies the main four.
- Guardian Purple is Theo's grandfather.
- Teacher/Phyllis is Theo's teacher. She thinks of Alex Grand as a role model.

== Episodes ==
=== Series overview ===
Season	Episodes	Originally released	
Season	Episodes	First released	Last released
Origins	2	26 September 2012	27 September 2012
1	11	30 September 2012	10 October 2012
2	9	11 October 2012	19 October 2012
3	9	15 March 2013	4 April 2013
4	11	2 October 2013	16 October 2013
5	10	5 April 2014	18 April 2014

=== The Origins (2012) ===
No.	Title	Original release date
Origins	"The Origins Part 1 – Murdock´s Dream"	26 September 2012
Origins	"The Origins Part 2 – The New Kingdoms"	27 September 2012

=== Season 1: The Beginning of Nutritions (2012) ===
No.	Title	Original release date
1	"Little Big Hero"	30 September 2012
2	"In Search of Energy"	1 October 2012
3	"Super-Sonic White Kingdom"	2 October 2012
4	"Freedom for the Yellow Kingdom"	3 October 2012
5	"Sweet Taste of Danger"	4 October 2012
6	"The Magic of Fruit"	5 October 2012
7	"Big Ben"	6 October 2012
8	"Ready to Roll"	7 October 2012
9	"Tough to Crack"	8 October 2012
10	"The Bitter Taste of Victory"	9 October 2012
11	"Alex Grand's Galaxy"	10 October 2012

=== Season 2: Kingdom of Medieval (2012) ===
No.	Title	Original release date
12	"Kingdom Under Fire"	11 October 2012
13	"Red Alert"	12 October 2012
14	"Danger! Slippery Kingdom!"	13 October 2012
15	"Out of The Frying Pan Into The Fire!"	14 October 2012
16	"Let's Burn That Fat!"	15 October 2012
17	"On The Wings of The Dragon"	16 October 2012
18	"Sun Salt and Sweat"	17 October 2012
19	"Kingdoms On The Verge of Extinction"	18 October 2012
20	"Roasted Red Kingdom"	19 October 2012

=== Season 3: Boosting West (2013) ===
No.	Title	Original release date
21	"Turbo Bean"	15 March 2013
22	"The Curse of The Spirit of The Light"	16 March 2013
23	"Hanging On"	17 March 2013
24	"Turbo Turbo Bang Bang"	18 March 2013
25	"Snakes and Beans"	19 March 2013
26	"The End of The Brown Kingdom"	22 March 2013
27	"A Seed of Hope"	23 March 2013
28	"Legumes Full Steam Ahead"	24 March 2013
29	"Collision Course"	25 March 2013

=== Season 4: Intelligence Sea (2013) ===
No.	Title	Original release date
30	"The Legend of Neptune's Stone"	2 October 2013
31	"The Return of the Terror of the Seas"	3 October 2013
32	"Guga Uga!"	12 October 2013
33	"Prepare for Dive"	13 October 2013
34	"Into the Shark's Jaws"	19 October 2013
35	"Underwater Pact"	20 October 2013
36	"A Sea of Tentacles"	26 October 2013
37	"Ice-Breaker Melody"	27 October 2013
38	"Blue Kingdom's Last Breath"	2 November 2013
39	"The Barrier of Fear"	3 November 2013
40	"Testing the Trident"	9 November 2013

=== Season 5: Apocalypse Vegetables (2014) ===
No.	Title	Original release date
41	"The Hidden Star"	7 April 2014
42	"The Curse of the Lost Vegetables"	8 April 2014
43	"The Mysterious Kingdom of Children"	9 April 2014
44	"A Well Guarded Stone"	10 April 2014
45	"The Four Signs of the Apocalypse"	11 April 2014
46	"The Triads of Light and Darkness"	14 April 2014
47	"Star Marathon"	15 April 2014
48	"In the Shadow of the Eclipse"	16 April 2014
49	"On the Edge of Madness"	17 April 2014
50	"The Path of the Lonely Star"	18 April 2014

== Production ==
Rui Lima Miranda founded Nutri Ventures in August 2009, alongside Rodrigo Carvalho and Pedro Van Zeller, to create an animated series promoting healthy eating habits. By 2011, the series was being pitched to TV channels and envisioned an initial series of 52 episodes with 23 minutes each. The cost of the project at the time was estimated to be €250,000; using a fund offered by Red Star. The initial target was to air the series in Portugal and Spain in the first quarter of 2012, while subsequently being dubbed into several languages. Seen at the time as the largest animation project in Portuguese history, almost a hundred people were working to get the series running by 2012, totalling 600 minutes of animation. Animation was made at Bang Bang Animation in Lisbon. The English dub was done in Miami at studios used by Disney. The product was sold in television fairs and received approval from Mexican and Brazilian stations, while it was outlined that the series would air in Portugal on RTP2 and Canal Panda.

In early 2013, it was already airing in 21 countries and was airing on the Spanish version of Disney Channel, becoming the first Portuguese animated series airing in Spain. By October, it consistently reached third or fifth place when it was airing on Portuguese channels.

In 2015, the company opened offices in New York to handle distribution, reaching out to more television channels and streaming services. After arriving to the United States as a streaming exclusive on Hulu and Kabillion, the series arrived to linear TV on the over-the-air kids network Qubo in 2016.

== Reception ==
Common Sense Media gave the series an extremely positive review, rating it at five stars and praising it for its lack of extreme violence and promotion of healthy eating like Clara in Foodland.
