= Culinary Genius =

- Genre: Cooking show
- Presented by: Gordon Ramsay; Fern Britton
- Starring: Rosemary Shrager; Phil Vickery; Jean-Christophe Novelli
- Country of origin: United Kingdom
- No. of series: 1
- No. of episodes: 20

Production
- Running time: 60mins (inc. adverts)
- Production companies: Studio Ramsay and Objective Productions

Original release
- Network: ITV
- Release: 17 April – 12 May 2017

Related
- ITV Food

Culinary Genius is a British ITV cooking entertainment programme created and produced by Gordon Ramsay.

== American adaptation ==
In May 2017, Gordon Ramsay announced that the series will be adapted for American television as part of their deal with 20th Century Fox Television and its producer All3Media; the half-hour series was picked up by Fox Television Stations as part of a three-week summer test run, former Dancing with the Stars host and current weekend co-anchor of Entertainment Tonight. Samantha Harris is the host of the American version with Edward Lee serves as the chef judge and Ramsay serves as the executive producer for the American version. The American adaptation was aired from 7 to 25 August 2017.
