= Bagong Pilipinas =

2024 political campaign rally in the Philippines

The "Bagong Pilipinas" branding and slogan of Marcos's governance released on July 16, 2023.

Bagong Pilipinas (transl. New Philippines) is the slogan of the administration of Bongbong Marcos, which focuses on an all-inclusive plan for economic and social transformation. After the issuance of Executive Order No. 14 (s. 2023) and the classification of the Pambansang Pabahay Para sa Pilipino as a national program, Memorandum Circular No. 24 was signed, establishing the Bagong Pilipinas as the administration's brand of governance and leadership. The name is derived from a campaign jingle used during Marcos's 2022 presidential campaign.

== Principles ==
Rev. Fr. Ranhilio Callangan Aquino, who defines Bagong Pilipinas as the "transformation of the idea of being a Filipino," outlined the key concepts of this governance campaign:

- Isip (Thoughts) – The Filipino can prosper in the Philippines.
- Salita (Words) – Be truthful, not perennially negative.
- Gawa (Works) – The future shall be brought to pass through Filipino efforts.

The Bagong Pilipinas concept of government is designed not to preserve the privileged, but to promote inclusivity in both fact and deed. It envisions an enabling government that actively reaches out to the people, dismantling structural barriers by engaging the active involvement of citizens and private groups.

== Launch ==
Bagong Pilipinas was officially launched with a kick-off rally on January 28, 2024, at the Quirino Grandstand in Manila, the capital of the Philippines. It was attended by about 400,000 supporters with the participation of Vice President Sara Duterte, other key Malacañang officials, and Manila Mayor Honey Lacuna. The rally was streamed online to engage a wider audience beyond Manila.

=== Preparation ===
The Metropolitan Manila Development Authority (MMDA) was in charge of traffic management. Several illegally parked vehicles on Mel Lopez Boulevard (R-10) in Tondo were towed in preparation for the rally. Traffic was re-routed around Rizal Park, and around 914 MMDA personnel were deployed to assist motorists and manage traffic.

== National government programs ==
- Build Better More – The infrastructure program of the Marcos administration (2022–2028), which superseded the Build! Build! Build! program of the Duterte administration. There is a total of 194 infrastructure projects, ranging from public transport, power, health, information technology, water resources, and agriculture. 77 of those projects were carried over from past administrations while 123 are “new and initiated” by the Marcos administration. The total cost for the Build Better More program is ₱9 trillion.
- Pambansang Pabahay Para sa Pilipino – The national housing program of the Philippines which was launched in 2022, with a goal of zero informal settlers by 2028. The Marcos administration aims to build around 1 million housing units annually until 2028.
- Bagong Pilipinas Serbisyo Fair – This epitomizes the government's commitment to accessibility and efficiency in public service delivery, bringing our services closer to the people.

=== Kick-off rally ===
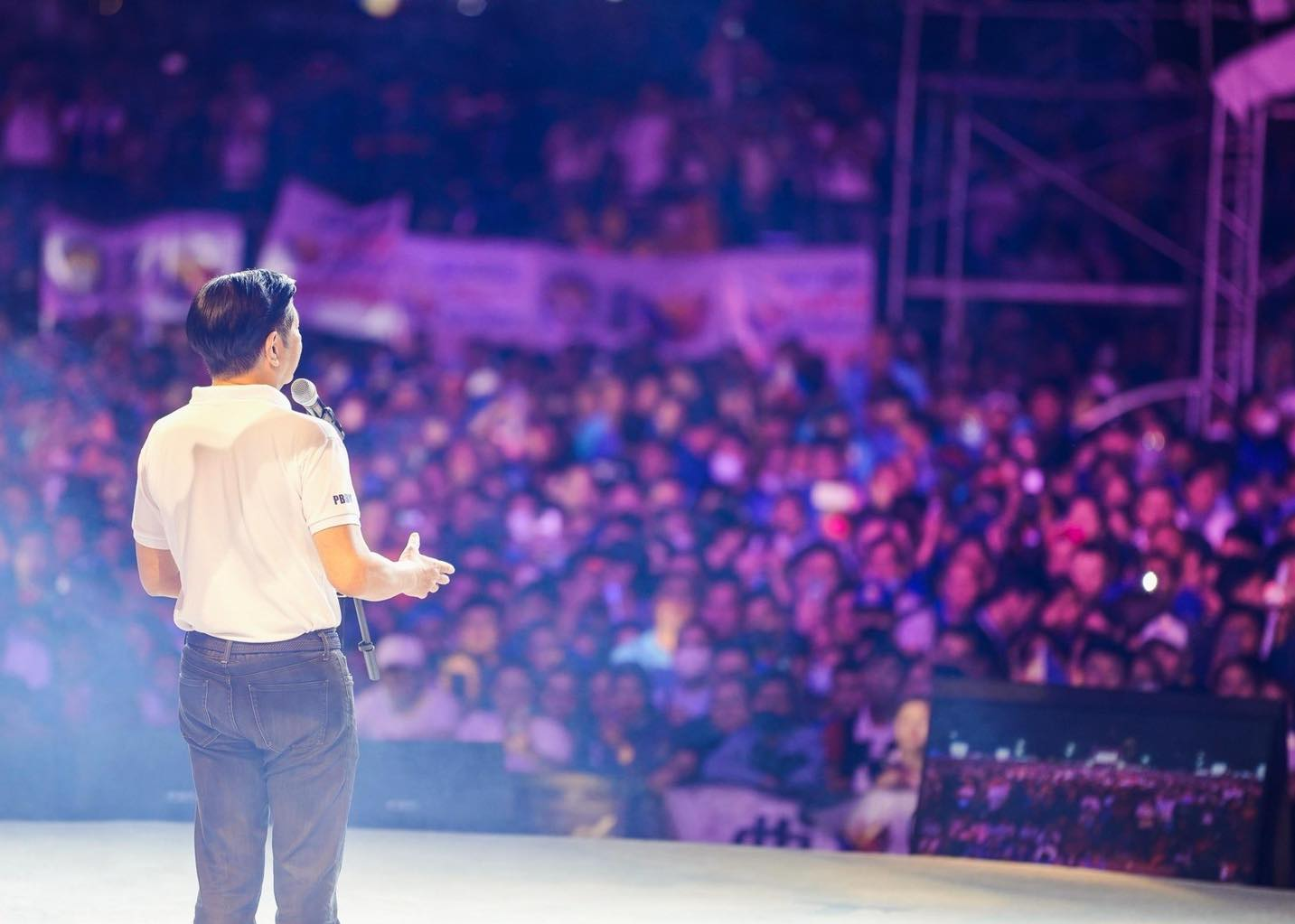
President Bongbong Marcos speaking before the crowd during the Bagong Pilipinas kick-off rally at Quirino Grandstand on January 28, 2024

Several government services were made available for free to the public during the event such as registration for national IDs, civil registration services, PRC exam applications, police clearance for first-time job-seekers, drug tests, neuropsychiatric tests, notary and gun safety seminars, licenses to possess firearms, housing loan applications, among others.

==== Required attendance ====
About two weeks before the rally, the Office of the President released Memorandum Circular No. 42, "directing" all national government agencies to "attend, participate, and provide full support to the 'Bagong Pilipinas' official campaign kickoff rally". Each line agency was ordered to send at least 1,000 participants, and several agencies also said compensatory time-offs and/or various benefits would be given to their employees who attend.

During the rally, an interview by the Philippine Daily Inquirer of an attending local official from Laguna cited the January 19 memorandum of Department of the Interior and Local Government (DILG) Secretary Benhur Abalos "strongly encouraging" local government units in the National Capital Region, Cavite, Laguna, Rizal, Bulacan, Pampanga, Angeles City, and Olongapo to attend the kick-off rally. The Inquirer also overheard some attendees saying "Wala namang ayuda" ("There's no handout").

==== Criticism ====
Senator Risa Hontiveros criticized the rally as a front for the People's Initiative (PI) signature drive to amend the Constitution. The rally was also called by progressive groups a "waste of people's resources" and "an expensive PR blitz to cover up the crisis the country is facing". A few hours after the Bagong Pilipinas rally, a prayer rally dubbed Hakbang ng Maisug was held in Davao City, attended by former president Rodrigo Duterte, his daughter Vice President Sara Duterte, and Marcos Jr's sister Senator Imee Marcos, denouncing ongoing PI efforts.

Bagong Alyansang Makabayan criticized the government for allocating nearly ₱24 million for the kick-off rally "like there’s no crisis." According to bidding documents, ₱16.4 million of the budget went to technical equipment rentals, while the remaining ₱7.59 million went to tokens and collateral. An additional ₱5.3 million was also initially allocated by the Presidential Communications Office for entertainment services, but the bidding did not push through.

== “Bagong Pilipinas” hymn, pledge and slogan ==
Bagong Pilipinas Hymn
- Government hymn of Philippines
- Lyrics: Florante, 2023
- Music: Florante, 2023
- Adopted: June 4, 2024

On June 4, 2024, Executive Secretary Lucas Bersamin signed Memorandum Circular No. 52, which directed government agencies and schools to include the singing of the “Bagong Pilipinas” hymn and the recitation of the “Panata sa Bagong Pilipinas” pledge in weekly flag ceremonies, as required by Section 18 of Republic Act No. 8491. The “Bagong Pilipinas” hymn, which begins with the words Panahon na ng pagbabago (“It is time for change”), is a patriotic and nationalistic anthem, bearing a resemblance to the Bagong Pagsilang from the administration of former President Ferdinand Marcos The circular further directed the Presidential Communications Group to implement the circular.

Earlier, in July 2023, Marcos Jr. also ordered government agencies to include the “Bagong Pilipinas” slogan in their programs and projects.

The Bagong Pilipinas hymn and pledge received criticism from several teachers groups and the advocacy group Campaign Against the Return of the Marcoses and Martial Law (CARMMA); the groups noted the hymn and pledge were reminiscent of the Bagong Lipunan hymn of the Martial law era of Bongbong Marcos' father and that more time would be consumed with the additional ceremonies. The Concerned Artists of the Philippines and ACT Teachers partylist described the hymn and pledge as an "old tune" and a "gimmick" of the government to whitewash its failures.

== See also ==
- Build Better More
- Pambansang Pabahay Para sa Pilipino
- Maharlika Investment Fund
- Alyansa para sa Bagong Pilipinas
- Hakbang ng Maisug
- Philippines 2000
