= S v Alexander =

In S v Alexander & Others, the court held that, in considering whether the offense with which an accused is charged has been set forth in such manner and with such particulars as may be reasonably sufficient to inform the accused of the nature of the charge, the court should exercise care not to confuse particulars which may be essential to warn the accused fairly and reasonably of the case which they have to meet, with the evidence which may be led in proof of the commission of the offense.

This does not mean that the accused must be informed of every detail of the case against them and, if the State does not know, for instance, how many meetings were held at certain places charged it obviously cannot inform or be compelled to inform the accused.

The State is merely expected to inform the accused of what it does know and upon what it is going to rely.
