= Southold Free Library =

Library in Southold, New York, United States

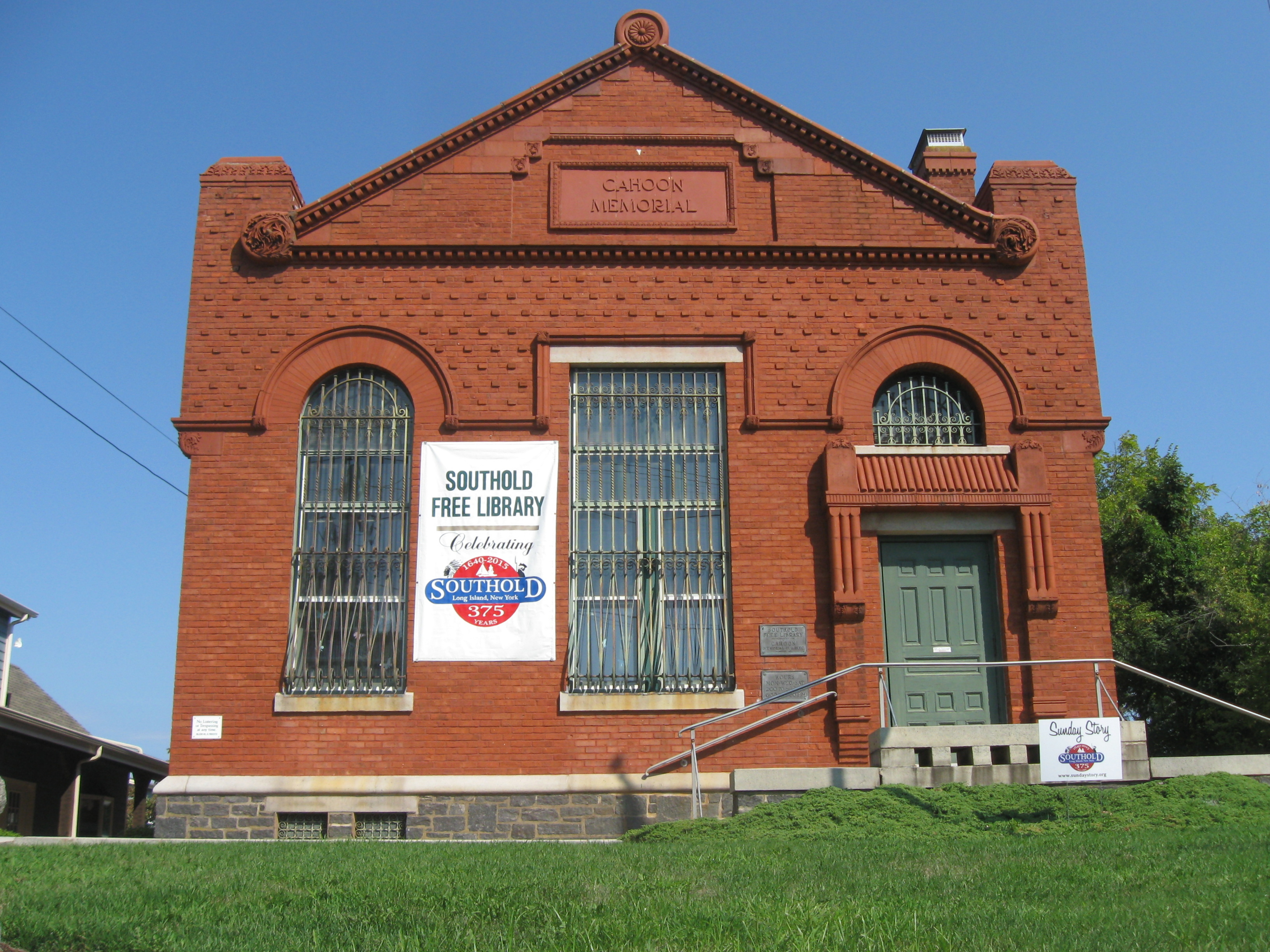
- Southold Free Library
- 41°03′52.4″N 72°25′45.1″W
- Location: Southold, New York, United States
- Type: Public library
- Established: 1904
- Branch of: Suffolk Cooperative Library System

Collection
- Size: 39,393

Access and use
- Circulation: 93,951
- Population served: 6,332

Other information
- Budget: $794,679 (as of 2012)
- Director: Caroline MacArthur
- Website: http://southoldlibrary.org/

The Southold Free Library is a public library located in Southold, New York, serving the towns of Southold and Peconic.

== History ==
The Southold Free Library is the third library organization to have served the town. It was preceded by the first (unnamed) library, and the Lyceum Library.

=== The first library ===
The incorporators of Southold's first library initially met on November 2, 1797 to set up a library for the purpose of "diffusing of useful knowledge and the improvement of the human mind." Membership dues were set at $3. The certificate of incorporation (recorded at the Suffolk County Court House) is dated November 20, 1797. The board of trustees held their first meeting on December 1, 1797 where they codified rules and penalties for overdue and damaged books. (The incorporators lived not only in Southold but as far as Riverhead.)

The initial location of the first library is not known. Apparently it led a peripatetic existence, at one point housed in the home of Captain John Yonges (for whom Youngs Avenue is named), at another point in the storefront of William H. Wells, and, in the mid-19th century, in the home of Slater Storrs Horton, postmaster and builder of the Presbyterian parsonage. By the 1860s the library had ceased to exist, while smaller libraries existed in churches and schools.

=== The Lyceum Library ===
The Southold Lyceum Association (an example of the then-prevalent Lyceum movement in the United States) made a second attempt at creating a library in the town. Organized on October 3, 1871, its purpose was "the improvement and entertainment of its members." It began operations on May 11, 1872 in the home of Jonathan W. Huntting, with H. Howard Huntting as librarian. In addition to lending books, its activities included picnics, lectures, and other fundraising activities, tied in with its purpose of Southold Lyceum Association, of hosting staged plays. An early catalog indicated that annual subscriptions cost $1, and weekly rentals began at 5 cents. The catalog dated June 13, 1884 indicates the library containing 636 books. From 1884-1887 the library was located in a room at the rear of Henry Howell's Drug Store, Henry Howell functioning as librarian. In 1888, the Southold Reading Room Association was formed to house the library. Apparently the maintenance of the library was too burdensome and the Southold Lyceum Association met on May 7, 1896 to dissolve the library. The Association subsequently donated the books to the Southold Union School. A 1947 article noted that, at a time where few schools had their own libraries, "The Lyceum Library enriched the life of this community for more than twenty years and then helped to raise the status of the public school from a district to a union school."

The origins of the Southold Free Library date to 1904 when Lucy Hallock and Rev. William H. Murray (he of the Universalist Church) recognized the propitious time to organize a library. Years later, Hallock (who by then had married Albert A. Folk) related that at the time of the library's formation, Southold had numerous groups promoting education, cultural, entertainment, a lecture association, a dramatic club, church and school libraries, and a book club of about 40 members. Hallock would visit the eastern part of Long Island on her bicycle; together with Rev. Murray they would go door-to-door circulating petitions and seeking supporters for an annual membership fee would be $1. A public meeting of the Southold Free Library Association was held on June 25, 1904 at Belmont Hall where attendees voted to organize a library in accordance with state law, which stipulated a minimum $100 raised in annual membership fees and the creation of a constitution, to which the state would reciprocate with an additional $100. That constitution, adopted at the board meeting of July 9, 1904, stated the purpose of the library was "To maintain a circulating library and reading room free for public use to the inhabitants of Southold, Bay View, Peconic and Arshamomoque School Districts."

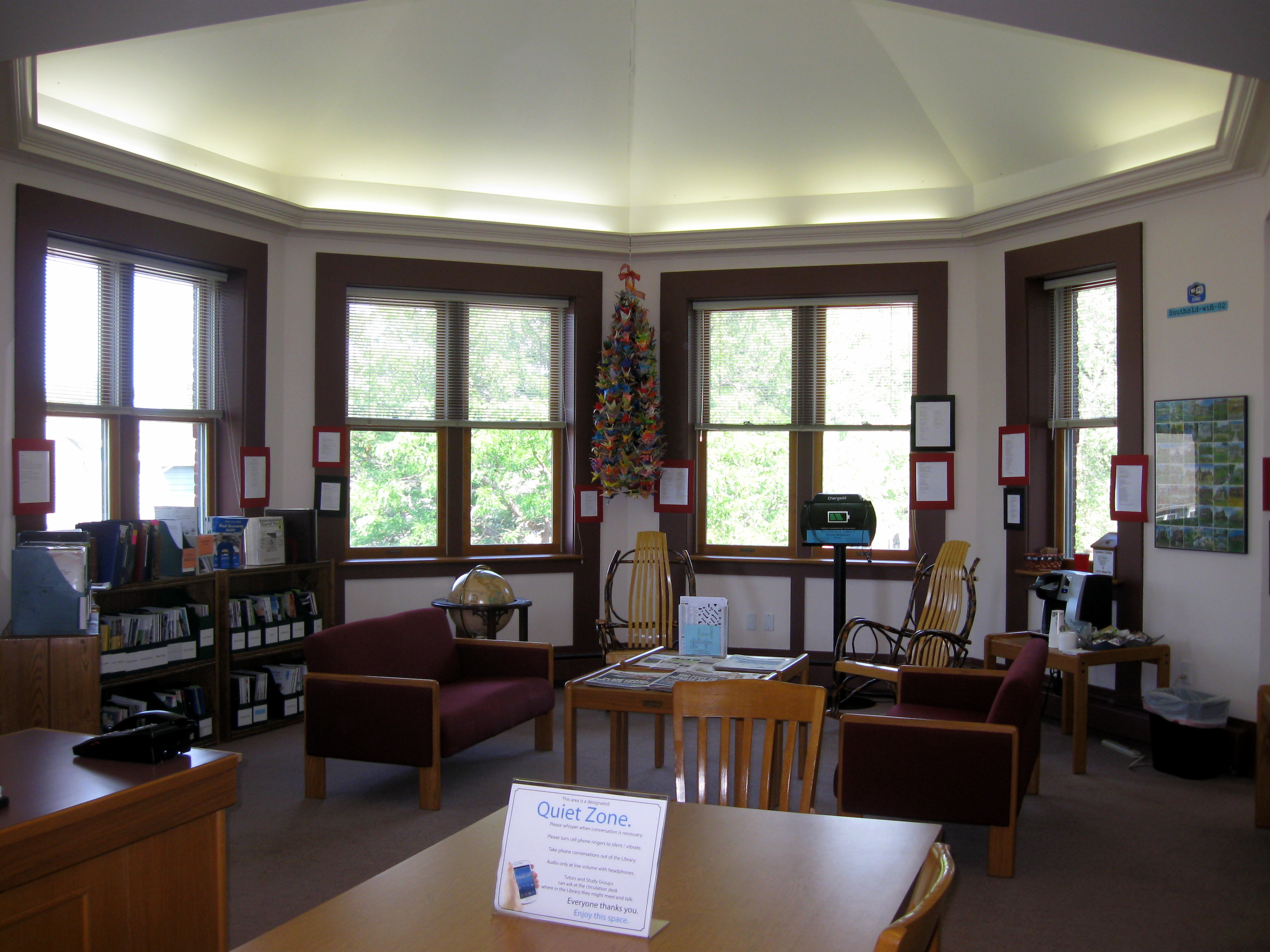
The second floor reading room of the Southold Free Library

The first location of the Southold Free Library was in the parlor of the house belonging to Valentine Heubel (whose house also contained a barber shop). The library opened to the public on October 5, 1904 with Lucy Hallock as the first librarian. Records show that 66 books were borrowed that day. Hallock later described the parlor as a small room, containing four windows, and a door to the sidewalk. The library was open on Monday, Wednesday, and Saturday afternoons for three hours each, and an extra two hours on Saturday evenings. In colder weather, the Heubels would keep a stove burning to provide warmth and serve coffee at the end of the day. By the first annual meeting, 500 books had been purchased with an additional 113 books acquired as gifts.

In 1907 the Heubels enlarged the library space by breaking through a wall. By July 1909 the collection had grown from 613 to 2,600 books. Whereas circulation for the nine months ending June 30, 1905 had been 6,816, by 1909 it had grown to 15,489. The library began a children's hour that year in efforts to promote closer relationships with children.

In 1912 the Library moved to its second location, the M. H. Hawkins Building on Beckwith Avenue. In 1915, W. H. Hawkings noted that a petition had been circulated in support of a $400 contribution to the library budget from the Southold School District. By 1920, the treasure could note that the school district contributed $400.

In 1925, the Southold Savings Bank left their building at the corner of Youngs Avenue. Edna Cahoon Booth (wife of Clement Booth), whose family had been Southold residents since 1900, purchased the building that year and donated it to the library as a memorial to her parents, Edward Cahoon and Georgianna (born Rockwell) Cahoon. The Town of Southold contributed $1,104 to the library on February 20, 1928. The library opened in the Cahoon Memorial Building, its current quarters, on December 15, 1928.

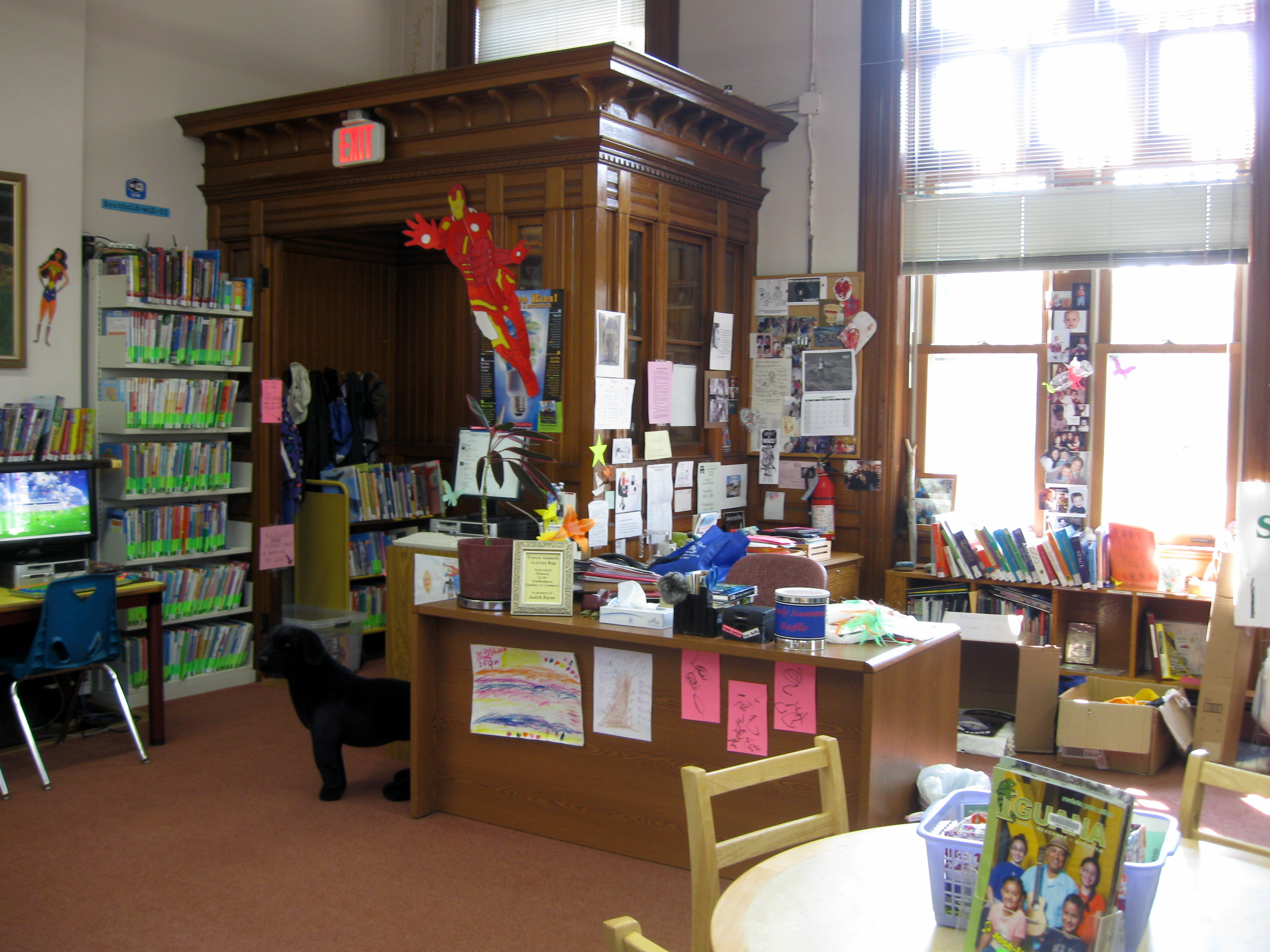
The Samuel and Beryl Epstein children's room in the Southold Free Library

On July 15, 1954, fifty years after the founding of the library, the Friends of the Southold Free Library was organized to support the library through fundraising. Its purpose as stated in original documentation was "to inform the public concerning the available services, resources and needs of the Library and to help it achieve its maximum usefulness to the community." From July 19–21, 1956, the Friends held their first book sale. As part of the celebration observing the Library's 50th anniversary, the trustees dedicated The Lucy Hallock Folk Room in honor of the Library's first librarian.

In 1961, the Library became a charter member of the Suffolk Cooperative Library System, allowing for enhanced borrowing and services among the member libraries of Suffolk County.

=== The building ===
The building now housing the Southold Free Library was built in 1891 in Richardsonian Romanesque style and originally housed the Southold Savings Bank. It was designed by George H. Skidmore of Riverhead, designer of the Queen Anne/Shingle Style First Congregation Church (built in 1909), as well as the Riverhead Savings Bank Building (built in 1892), both in Riverhead, as well as many private residences on Eastern Long Island. His design for what is now the Library was described as a "compact one-story building with a parapet gable terminating in square brick posts...Decorative elements include iron window grates, granite coping and projecting brick headers on the upper half of the facade" making the structure, when first built, an "innovative addition to the Southold streetscape."

=== Services ===
In addition to loaning typical library materials (books, e-books, CDs, DVDs), the Southold Free Library lends out fishing rods. It also provides space for the community to enjoy air-conditioning (appreciated by the community during a 2015 power outage), Wi-Fi, a charging station, coffee, a chance to try out iPads. The Library enjoys occasional use of a 3D printer which rotates residence among several Suffolk public libraries (a benefit of belonging to the Suffolk Cooperative Library System). Additionally the Library provides delivery for those who are home-bound, a book discussion group, technical assistance, classes, resume writing and job assistance, and a small gallery space. The Library functions as a community space with a wide variety of programming aimed at children of all ages as well as adults, including lectures, tours, community walks, discounts to museums and other places of interest, and classes in conversational English. Several yards north of the Library, the Book Cottage functions as a community used bookstore with the funds raised going to the Library.

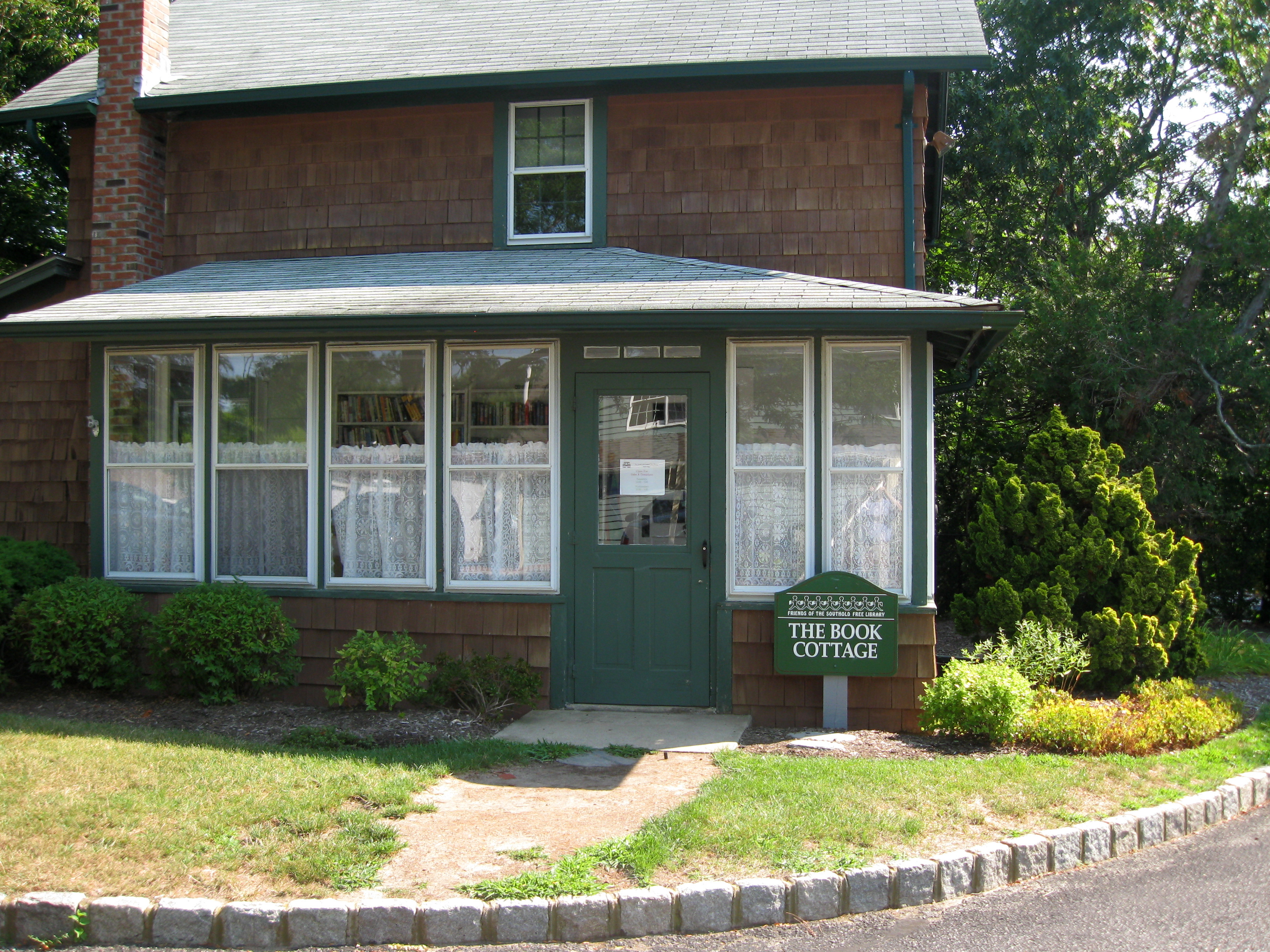
The Southold Free Library's Book Cottage is where one can donate and purchase used books, funds going to the Library

=== Whitaker Historical Collection ===
The Whitaker Historical Collection, the library's Special Collections, is named for Reverend Epher Whitaker (1820-1916) who came to Southold to become minister of the town's First [Presbyterian] Church at the age of 31 in 1851 and lived there until his death. Additionally he founded the Southold Academy (town's first high school) and was author of the book History of Southold, L.I.: Its First Century (New York: Printed for the author, 1881). In his honor, a group of residents founded the Whitaker Historical Collection in 1940 to be housed the library. This group initiated the collection with a variety of historical documents: books, diaries, genealogies, letters, business ledgers, a variety of manuscript documents, and photographs. Over the years others have contributed additional historical materials documenting the history of Southold and its residents. Among its holdings are the materials belonging to Epher Whitaker including the historical research he undertook for his publications on Southold history.

=== 1991 renovation ===
Due to numerous instances of damage due to leaks, vandalism, an old furnace, and general deterioration of a building approaching its first century, Library trustees entertained the idea of renovation in 1979, recognizing that fundraising and completion of the task could take years. In 1986, after a changeover in library directors and appointment of new board members, the trustees appointed local architects Nancy L. Steelman and Thomas C. Samuels to propose renovations to the Library. With their associate Ural Taggart, the architects chose to create a three-story adjoining structure that would continue the building's original style but with fanciful touches. The plan was accepted by the trustees in 1987 and a kickoff fundraiser took place on July 28, 1988. Through far-sighted vision, the Library owned much of the adjacent land. Meanwhile, the building had to be repointed for the safety of patrons. Eventually, after much fundraising (including grants), and obtaining the appropriate zoning permits, the Tromel Construction Corporation of Bay Shore was awarded the contract; a groundbreaking ceremony was held on April 20, 1990. The dedication of the renovated library took place exactly 100 years after the building's opening on December 15, 1991.

=== 2008 expansion proposal and defeat ===
Already in 2002 and 2006 the Library had purchased adjacent property, anticipating a time when the area could be used. By 2007, the library board had documented a dramatic increase in library circulation and use of library services which was taxing the building and staff (most of which had no offices). In order to meet the community's needs, in 2008 the Library board proposed an expansion of the library building.

The $7.25 million expansion would have added 7,700 square feet to the existing 9,000-square-foot building. Although some of the funding would have come from development, property tax assessment would have cost taxpayers an extra $115–135 per year for twenty years. Possibly due to the continued effects of the 2008 financial crisis the proposal was found unappealing and the library expansion plan was defeated in October 2010.

Recognizing that a physical expansion would be unpopular while the economy is still in recovery, in 2015 the Board of Trustees agreed to reconfigure the existing structure in order to maximize space. Such efforts are ongoing.

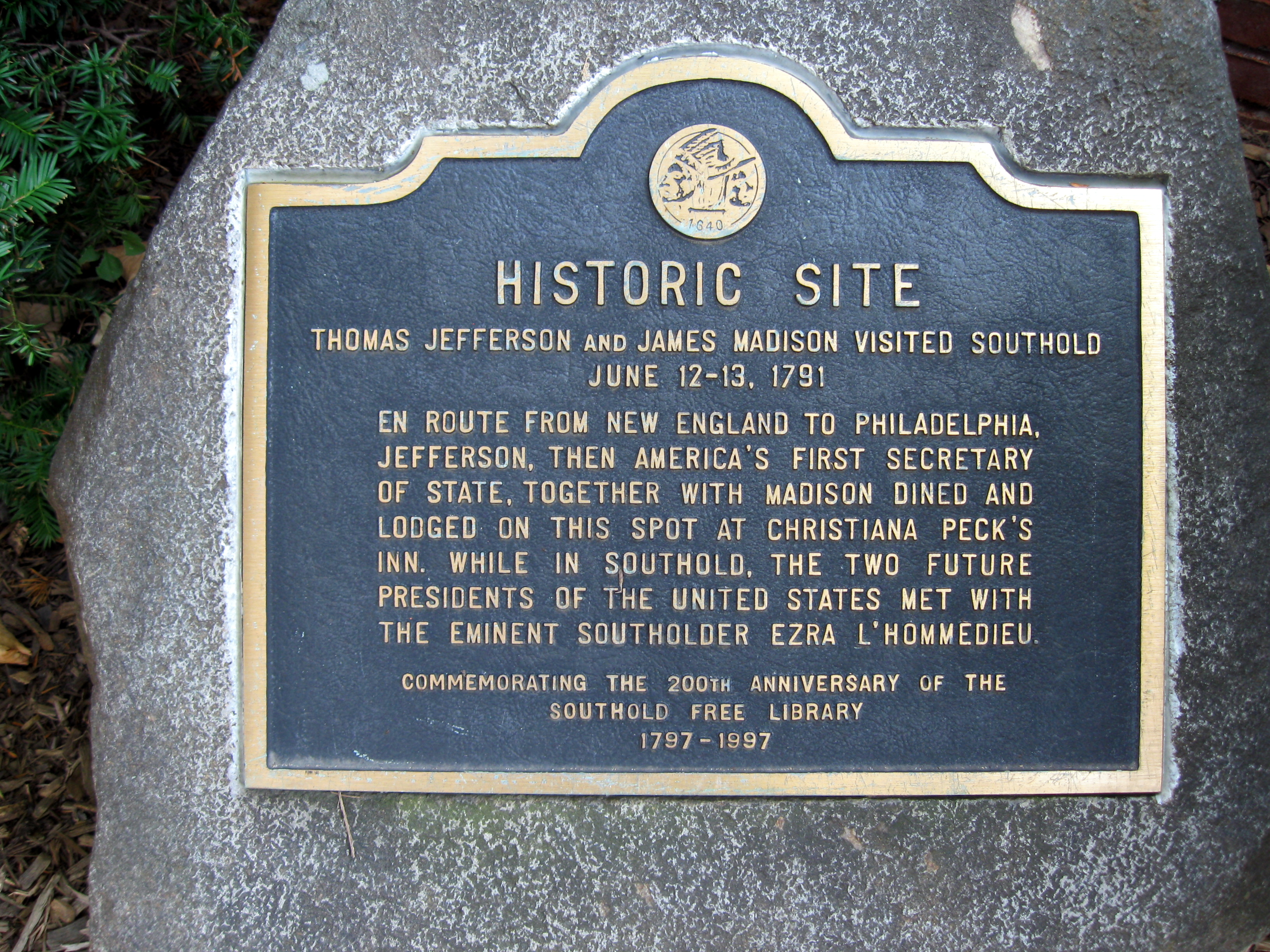
Commemorative plaque on the property of the Southold Free Library noting Thomas Jefferson's and James Madison's visit to Southold, June 12–13, 1791

=== 2018 renovation ===
On August 1, 2018, the Library closed for an 18 month complete interior renovation. Director Caroline MacArthur oversaw the project, while offering all services to the community from a temporary location in the Feather Hill shopping plaza adjacent to the building. Changes to the physical space include the creation on the second floor of a teen space and spaces for study, gaming that will foster greater socialization. The Whitaker Room (containing the extensive local history collection) was moved down to the first floor, providing greater community exposure. The renovation is being led by architect Vincent Benic who is a part-time Southold resident. The renovation is expected to cost $1.7 million; $1 million raised from previous donations, and $750,000 to be raised from a five year tax increase that the town voted in favor of. The renovation that cost $1.75 million was completed in February 2020.
