= Varieties of criticism =

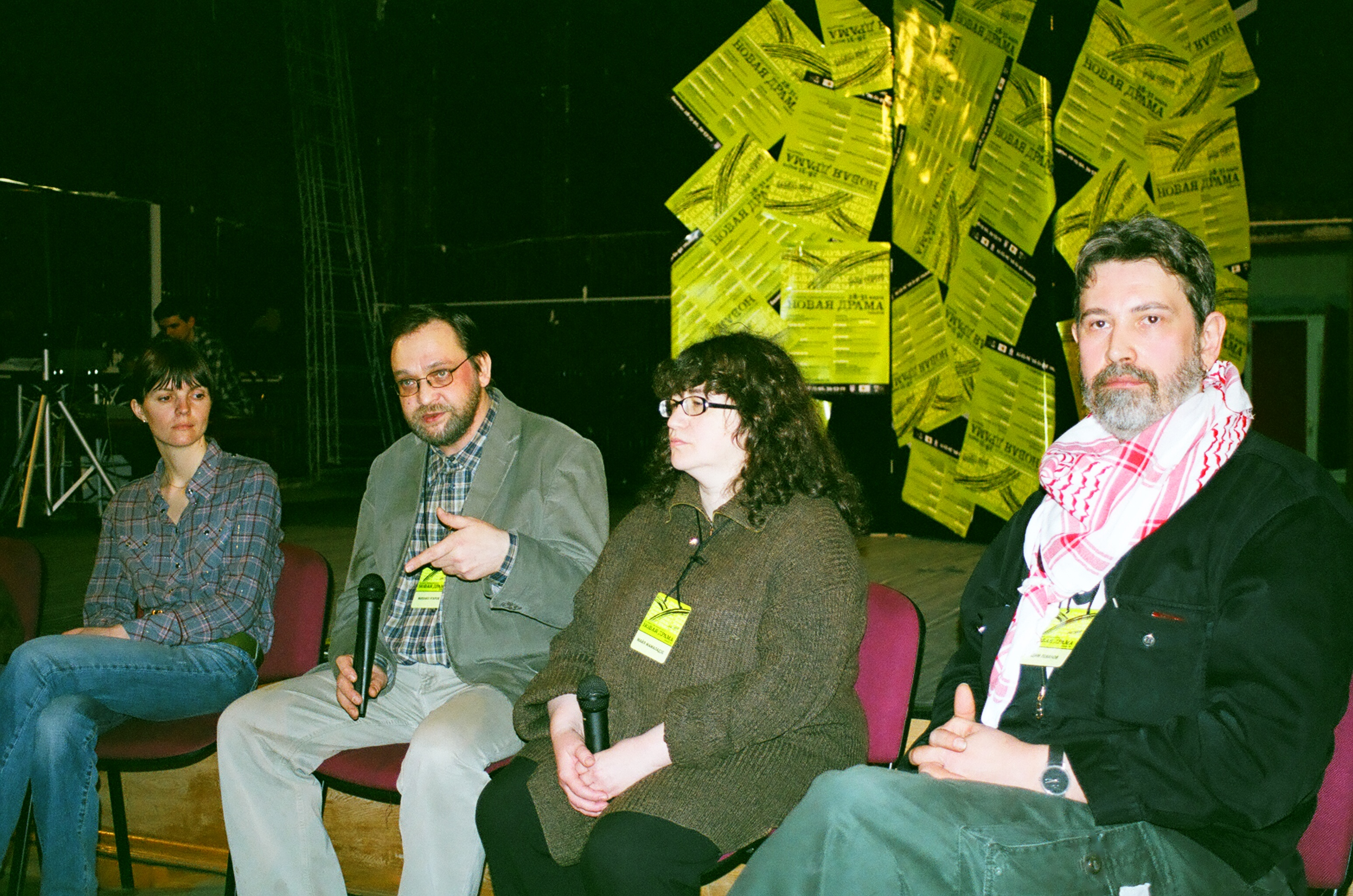
Theatre critics and playwrights discuss plays at a theatre festival.

There are many varieties of criticism. This article describes common types that occur regularly in everyday life. For other criteria that classify criticisms, see Criticism § Classifications. For more subject-specific information, see the pages on topics such as art, film, literature, theatre, or architecture.

== Aesthetic criticism ==
Aesthetic criticism is a part of aesthetics concerned with critically judging beauty and ugliness, tastefulness and tastelessness, style and fashion, meaning and quality of design—and issues of human sentiment and affect (the evoking of pleasure and pain, likes and dislikes). Most parts of human life have an aesthetic dimension, which means there is plenty potential for criticism. Often architecture criticism is considered the highest form of aesthetic criticism, because architecture combines art, science and technology to build a pleasing home environment, a "living space" that people must inhabit everyday, more or less permanently.

An aesthetic critic however does not simply say "it's beautiful" or "it's ugly." Instead, the aim is to explain the meaning of a work of art, why something is beautiful or ugly, or how the meaning of a design should be interpreted, the stronger and weaker sides of a cultural object, etc. For this purpose, aesthetic critics have a toolkit of criteria they can use in their commentary. These criteria include such things as:

- The motive behind creative activity
- Total context within which creative activity occurred
- Techniques or physical forces used to create the aesthetic effect
- Values, sentiments, interests, needs or ideals that a phenomenon communicates
- Relationship of an object of criticism to associated objects, themes, traditions, or genres
- Interaction between observer and observed, and the overall effect
- Function the object of the criticism fulfills

Using these kinds of criteria, which usually assume extensive relevant knowledge, aesthetic critics can inform their audience about the achievements and limitations of the object of aesthetic criticism. In this way, they can draw attention to aesthetic issues most people might have overlooked, educate people in their aesthetic appreciation, and stimulate debate about what kinds of aesthetic expressions are preferable.

In part, aesthetic criticism can genuinely prove aesthetic propositions;– if they concern matters of factual or logical evidence. For example, either an artist had a certain motivation, or s/he did not. But insofar as "beauty is in the eye of the beholder", there is always also a subjective element in aesthetic criticism, which is not provable, but expresses a preference, a personal taste. It may be possible to explain that preference, but it may not be possible to compare it meaningfully with other preferences.

== Logical criticism ==
In a logical criticism, an objection is raised about an idea, argument, action or situation on the ground that it does not make rational sense (there is something wrong with it because it is illogical, it does not follow, or it violates basic conventions of meaning. Such an objection usually refers to assumptions, coherence, implications, and intent. Thus, the illogicality may involve something that:

- Is being assumed or inferred improperly, without reasonable ground
- Is internally inconsistent or self-contradictory in a way that makes it impossible to maintain all its content at once (because it would affirm and negate the same thing)
- Has implications or effects that are contrary to itself, or negate itself
- Has effects contrary to its own purpose or intent, or contrary to the purpose or intent of someone concerned with it
- involves a language that superficially makes sense, but defies logic when examined closely

Logical criticism is rooted in the basic cognitive principles that guide the behavior of humans and other sentient organisms: stimulus identification ("this is the recognized identity of X"), stimulus distinction ("this is different from that"), and stimulus generalization ("this is the same, or like that" or "this is an instance of type X"). The Greek philosopher Aristotle stated the most basic building blocks of logic as the law of identity, the law of non-contradiction and the law of the excluded middle. These are basic conditions for making meaningful sense, and for non-arbitrary representation.

Logical criticism presupposes that people accept at least the most basic rules of logic. If people believe "things mean just what they want them to mean", or if people constantly "change the meaning to suit the moment", logical criticism is not at all effective. Logical criticism assumes that there is a definite, identifiable, discoverable meaning, or at least that something can be proved meaningless (because it lacks any predictable or knowable pattern).

Logical criticism also presupposes that people agree about at least some basic facts and assumptions about the situation, or have in common at least some beliefs. It is not possible to argue about a logical criticism with somebody with whom one does not share any assumptions at all, or who is unwilling to consider at least the possibility that a given proposition might be true (or false). Very often, logical arguments take the form "suppose that X is the case", but if people reject the "suppose" or cannot imagine it, it becomes difficult to get the logical criticism off the ground.

== Factual criticism ==
In a factual (empirical) criticism, an objection is raised about an idea, argument, action or situation on the ground that there is something wrong with the evidence of the known experience relevant to it. Typically;

- Relevant purported facts are labeled false or implausible, i.e., not facts at all.
- Relevant facts are said not to have been definitely established as true, or the likelihood that they are true, has not been established.
- Relevant facts mentioned imply different stories that cannot be reconciled. Accepting a fact would imply another fact that contradicts it in some way (this overlaps with logical criticism).
- The presentation of facts is biased. Important relevant facts are missing, or the total factual context is ignored.
- Other relevant facts, which have not been mentioned, shed a different light on the issue.
- Facts focused upon are not relevant to the purpose of those concerned.

Logical and factual criticism is generally considered important to ensure the consistency, authenticity and predictability of behavior of any kind. Without the presence of the relevant consistency, authenticity and predictability, one cannot make appropriate sense of behavior, which becomes disorienting and creates confusion, and therefore cannot guide behavioral choices effectively.

Philosophers have often debated about "what makes a fact, a fact." The basic problem with facts is that observations, made using the five senses, are never completely free from interpretation – to understand a fact as a fact, requires being able to place its meaning, which in turn requires basic cognitive categorizations not contained in the observed thing itself. A fact is concluded in the interaction between the observer and the observed.

Nevertheless, most people agree there are such things as the stubborn facts, i.e., evidence no one can deny, because everybody experiences the evidence in the same way, under the same conditions. That reality is essential for effective factual criticism. If people regard factual evidence as simply a subjective interpretation of experience, then factual criticism is ineffective. Factual criticism assumes, that people agree there exists a reality beyond their personal experience, that it is possible to obtain reliable information about it, and that people ordinarily experience those facts in the same way.

== Positive criticism ==
A positive criticism draws attention to a good or positive aspect of something that is being ignored or disregarded. People may be able to see only the negative side of something, so that it becomes necessary to highlight the positive side. A positive criticism may also be a type of self-justification or self-defense.

The term "positive criticism" is also used in the sense that the criticism is "well-meant" or "well-intentioned" ("I mean it in a positive way"). Here, the criticism intends to serve a purpose that is constructive, or that the targeted person would approve of.

The basic aim of positive criticism is usually to provide a better orientation, or frame of reference, for behavior. It provides ideas people can act on to improve the situation. At the very least, it provides more choices for behavior, and therefore potentially enlarges behavioral freedom.

A positive criticism can be stated as a positive alternative ("there are good reasons for thinking that we are better off to do Y, instead of X"). It does not necessarily say, that the option criticized is all bad, but rather that an alternative option is better, or preferable.

== Negative criticism ==
Negative criticism means voicing an objection to something, only with the purpose of showing that it is wrong, false, mistaken, nonsensical, objectionable, or disreputable. Generally, it suggests disapproval of something, or disagreement with something – it emphasizes the downsides of something. Negative criticism is also often interpreted as an attack against a person (ad hominem). That may not have been the intention, but it can be interpreted that way.

Negative criticism can have the effect that the people criticized feel attacked or insulted by it, so that they either do not take it seriously, or react badly to it. Much often depends on how much negative criticism there is, and how much criticism is transmitted at once. People can handle some negative criticism, but they may not be able to handle a whole lot of negative criticism, at least not all at once.

The downside of negative criticism is, often, that it tells people what they cannot or should not do or believe, rather than telling them what they can or should do (what possibilities or options there are). So it may be disabling, rather than enabling. People might reply to a negative criticism that "this is all very well, but I cannot do anything with it", or they might say "now what?!". Yet, negative criticism may be necessary at times, to prevent a course of action harmful to the people concerned. If people are afraid to state a negative criticism, the existing problem might get worse.

The upside of negative criticism is that it can explain what the limitations of an idea, an action or a situation are, for the sake of being realistic. Sometimes it is necessary to say "no" to something (and explain why "no" is "no").

In the modern world, negative criticism has acquired the stigma of "being negative", and people who make negative criticisms can be easily exploited or manipulated. For this reason, many people nowadays express their negative criticism simply by not saying anything, not paying attention to something or someone, or by being absent.

== Constructive criticism ==
Constructive criticism aims to show that an intent or purpose of something is better served by an alternative approach. In this case, making the criticism is not necessarily deemed wrong, and its purpose is respected; rather, it is claimed that the same goal could be better achieved via a different route. Constructive criticisms are often suggestions for improvement – how things could be done better or more acceptably. They draw attention to how an identified problem could be solved, or how it could be solved better. Constructive criticism is more likely accepted if the criticism is timely, clear, specific, detailed and actionable.

Both negative and constructive criticism have their appropriate uses, but often it is considered a requirement of criticism that they are combined, because people want to know both what is succeeding and what is failing, what is going well and what is going wrong, the plus points and the minus points. It is often considered that those who find fault with something should also offer an option for putting it right. Psychologically, people are more likely to accept that something is going wrong, if they are also informed about what is going well.

More generally, any rule for behavior of any kind usually implies both "do's" and "don't s". Doing something usually also implies not doing something else, and, not doing something, often implies doing something else. There is therefore a conscious choice "to do this, or do that", but not both at the same time. So, to orient behaviour, people need to know both what is "ruled in" and what is "ruled out". If the criticism concerns only one aspect, but not the other, it may supply only incomplete information, which is not really adequate to orient behaviour or guide action. One of the most elementary reasons why a rule is ignored, flouted or subverted is, because either the positive or the negative aspect of what it means is left unspecified.

== Destructive criticism ==
Destructive criticism aims to destroy the target of criticism, and may be followed by thought-based violence. (e.g., "You should shut up and follow the program."). The aim is to show that the point of view of someone else is irrelevant, has no validity, or lacks merit.

In some contexts, destructive criticism is regarded as an undesirable nuisance, a threat, or as completely unjustifiable, especially if it involves personal attacks. Destructive criticism is often criticized because it has a destructive effect, instead of a positive effect (this may also just be an accusation or allegation if there is no proof that the effect actually is destructive).

However, in political, logistical and military contexts, destructive criticisms may be essential to save resources or to save lives among one's own group. An idea in itself is not dangerous, but an idea proposed in a particular context can be very dangerous so that people feel that it should be disarmed by mercilessly criticizing it. The ultimate destructive criticism occurs when people and property are physically destroyed, and vice versa.

The term "destructive criticism" is also used to mean that the level, scope, or intensity of criticism is such, that it becomes mainly destructive. In this context, people believe that the criticism is so great, or there is so much criticism, that it only destroys things. For example, a debate or controversy can get out of control, so that everybody is at war with everybody else, and everybody is opposed to everybody else. In that case, it may well be that the criticism is being overdone ("overkill"). What started out as a structured dialogue to identify conflicting aspects of a situation, ends up as chaos in which nobody can agree with anyone else anymore.

Destructive criticism from parents and other authority figures causes psychological harm to children that results in lower levels of self-esteem, social acceptance, scholastic competence, behavioral conduct, global self-worth, and generally poorer self-perception. This is a significant issue. In this study of 144 children from a middle-class environment, only six children (4%) reported that they had never been subject to physical punishment or the target of rejecting, demeaning, terrorizing, destructively criticizing, or perceived insulting statements. Some parents may ask how do you correct a child who is misbehaving if you do not criticize.

== Practical criticism ==
Practical criticism is an objection or appraisal of the type, that something "does or does not work" in practical reality, due to some reason or cause. The focus is on useful effect. Often people say, "That might be fine in theory, but in practice it does not work." Inversely, they might show with experiment that something works well in practice, even although the theory says this is not possible – so that the theory ought to be adjusted.

Practical criticism usually refers to relevant practical experience, to reveal why an action is wrongheaded, or under what conditions it would succeed. When someone proposes an idea, others might first consider if it makes sense – but often raise concerns about practicality and consequences. For example, would relevant people or organizations be better off or worse off? Does it get in the way of other things?

Practical criticisms are effective, if people are concerned with practicalities. If, however, people are purely concerned with what things mean, or ought to mean, they may not care about whether their way of seeing things is "practical" or not. People might hold on to their beliefs or defend them, even if they are not very practical at all, because they feel those beliefs are essential to who they are.

Practical criticism usually succeeds best, if it is made on the basis of the practical experience of the critic. Somebody who has practical experience with an issue, is usually best placed to make a practical criticism.

== Theoretical criticism ==
Theoretical criticism is concerned with the meaning of ideas, including ideas on which a practice is based. It is concerned with the coherence or meaningfulness of a theory, its correspondence to reality, the validity of its purpose, and the limitations of the viewpoint it offers. Theories can be criticized;

- From the point of view of other theories ("how much sense does it make")
- Internally "in their own terms" ("is it consistent")
- In terms of the experiential evidence there is for those theories ("how well does the theory correspond to the facts")
- The usefulness or practical gain of a theory.
- The moral implications of the theory for human action and behaviour.

At issue is not simply whether an idea makes sense or is consistent, but whether it makes sense and is consistent in terms of the theoretical framework it is part of. In other words, at issue is the relationship between many linked ideas. What effect does the adoption of one idea have for a lot of related ideas, and how does a theory relate to all the evidence it can be called upon to explain. A theory can consist of one major hypothesis, but usually a theory consists of a series of linked hypotheses. Adopting one hypothesis can have many effects for other related hypotheses.

The merits of theories are usually judged according to three main criteria: their usefulness, their explanatory power and their predictive power. A theory is useful if it can help to guide or orient activity, serves the relevant purpose, or if it helps to make sense of things. A theory with great explanatory power is a theory which is able to account for all the relevant evidence, not just some. If the assumptions made by the theory are well-taken, it can predict effects, outcomes and results quite accurately. If theories are criticized, it is usually on the ground that they are not useful, do not speak to the situation, and fail to explain or predict things properly. Usually, the best theory is the simplest theory that explains the most. A theory that becomes extremely complicated often no longer provides much guidance, because it is no longer clear that anything in particular definitely follows from it. However, theories can also be judged according to their moral implications: if the theory is adopted, how does this affect the values and behaviour of people who subscribe to it?

Theoretical criticism often occurs in the context of eclecticism and intellectual opportunism, when people more or less creatively "cobble together" in one interpretation a bunch of ideas and models that draw from a variety of sources. The criticism might be that those ideas do not belong together, that they are not compatible, or that they produce an elaborate description that fails to explain anything. The theoretical critic then attempts to redress the situation by showing that a consistent theory requires abandoning or changing some ideas, or discarding the whole eclectic combination in favour of a more consistent interpretation.

== Public and private criticism ==
Criticism can be expressed publicly or privately. The most private criticism exists only in the mind of the critic. The most obvious reason why criticisms are not expressed, or only expressed privately, is that the critic believes public knowledge of the criticism would harm the critic or others. People often first express criticisms privately to test their validity, formulation, or reactions to them. It may require courage, conviction, or certainty to express a criticism publicly.

However, the distinction between "private" and "public" itself may be rather vague, or there may be various gradations between "absolutely private" and "definitely public". Yet even if a criticism is publicly accessible already, it may remain relatively unknown, because it is only available in a rather obscure place, or because people are simply not looking for it. The criticism may exist for years, before someone digs it out, and presents it in a forum that makes it widely known.

The degree to which criticisms are made privately or publicly, often depends on customary or legal norms for expressing criticism. Thus, the degree to which a criticism is accessible may be influenced by moral considerations, fear, the human or commercial interests at stake, or authority issues. Criticisms can of course also be expressed anonymously or under a pseudonym, in which case the identity of the critic or the source of the criticism remains unknown. In this case, the criticism exists in public, but where exactly it came from remains private. If a criticism is actively suppressed or censored, then although there may have been an attempt to publicize it, it may not become public knowledge because there was no possibility for making it public. Yet criticisms can also travel very fast "through the grapevine" so that, although they are publicly denied or ignored, everyone knows what they are, because their peers informally communicated the criticism.

== Moral criticism ==
Moral criticism is basically concerned with the rights and wrongs of values, ethics or norms people uphold, what is good and bad about what people do, or the rights and wrongs of the conditions people face. Morality is concerned with what is good and bad for people, and how we know that. There are many forms of moral criticism, such as:

- Showing that actions taken are inconsistent or incompatible with certain values being upheld, or values deemed desirable
- Counterposing one set of values to another, with the claim that the one set is better than the other
- Arguing that certain values are intrinsically objectionable, regardless of any other values that may be relevant
- Arguing that certain values ought to be adopted or rejected for some reason
- Arguing that, for the sake of integrity, somebody should or shouldn't do something

Rational or civil morality is based on the idea that people should be treated in the same ways, in the same kind of situation; the same norm should apply to all people concerned, in the same relevant situation. The exception that proves the rule implies that there does exist a moral rule, to which it is an exception, for a definite and explicable reason. Such a morality is often assumed because, without it, human behaviour would be unpredictable or arbitrary, and cannot be relied upon; the necessary co-operation between people as social beings would be hindered. Modern jurisprudence and legal systems are, at least in principle, based on this idea. It originates from the two social norms, often expressed in religions, that one should "do unto others as one would like them to do unto oneself" and "not do unto others as one would not like them to do unto oneself." Consistent behaviour in this sense is regarded as most likely to be effective for survival and achievement in the long run, in contrast to chaotic or arbitrary behaviour ("arbitrary" in the sense that one's own interests and needs, or the interests and needs of others are not properly taken into account).

Nevertheless, values people hold often clash, and how "consistency" should be interpreted may be disputed. Hence moral criticism ranges from whether there should be a moral rule at all and the justification of a moral rule, to the interpretation of the meaning of a moral rule, and to how it is in practice applied. The debate can be pursued formally (for example by lawyers, judges, religious authorities and politicians) or informally (by any citizens of a community). Philosophers of ethics aim to shed light on moral disputes by means of critical thinking, often with the aim of clearing up moral confusions, and improving moral behaviour.

== Scientific criticism ==
Scientific criticism is not primarily concerned with moral values, but more with quantitative or categorical values. It focuses on whether an idea can be proven true or false, or what the limits of its valid application are, quite irrespective of whether people like that or not, or what the moral implications are. For this purpose, the scientist employs logic and relevant evidence offered by experience, as well as experimentation, and gives attention to the intent and purpose of relevant activity.

Obviously a scientist is also a moral being with moral biases, but science aims to ensure that moral biases do not prejudice scientific findings (the requirement of objectivity). If scientists would ignore relevant evidence pertaining to a case, for example because of some personal bias, they could be criticized for that.

Scientists can also criticize a specific morality on scientific grounds, but in a scientific capacity they do not do so on the ground that the morality itself is intrinsically objectionable, but rather that it cannot be reconciled with the facts, i.e., it involves assumptions or valuations contrary to known logical and factual evidence.

Science is typically not concerned with judging the desirability of ends in themselves, but rather with the relationship of means and ends. The question in scientific activity is usually to ascertain – with reasoning, study and experiment – whether the chosen means can or cannot, as a matter of objective fact, produce the envisaged result, and why that is. So a scientist mainly aims to prove with evidence and reasoning, that if one wants to achieve X, then one must do Y, or not do Z. But whether one wants to achieve X or not, may be a separate question, on which a scientist cannot adjudicate, because telling people what they ought to do with themselves falls outside the realm of scientific inquiry. At most a scientist might say that, if X is achieved, it will have specific benefits, and if it is not achieved, it will have certain harmful effects or costs for the people concerned (or vice versa).

When scientists criticize other scientists, the criticism can be very specialized and technical, so that it may not be very easy to understand the meaning – unless one is familiar with the particular scientific discipline. There are some general rules for scientific criticism, but most often each branch of scientific research has its own rules and formats for criticizing. Science is above all a search for truth, and therefore if scientists are dishonest (for example, by faking the evidence), they are not being "scientific", dishonesty then is an obvious target for criticism. Other, more common, criticisms relate to assumptions, sampling bias, methodological error, statistical issues or invalid conclusions.

== Religious criticism ==
Religious criticism is primarily concerned with judging actions and ideas according to whether God (or the Gods, or other divine beings) would regard them as good or bad for human beings (or for the world). Normally a religion has some sacred or holy texts, which serve as an authoritative guide to interpreting actions and ideas as either good or bad. From these, religious authorities derive norms for how people ought to live and act in the world.

However, sacred texts may not always be clear, and may require interpretation. Thus, theologians ask critical questions such as, "How do we know what God wants for human beings?" They try to answer these questions by reasoning based on religious principles, rules, laws, by considering what people experience, and by "divine inspiration" through prayer and meditation.

Religious authorities such as the Pope may criticize how people behave, if the behaviour conflicts with church doctrine. In religious criticism, the motive or intention of the criticism (why somebody is criticizing) is important. Criticism must be offered in the right spirit so that it has a good effect.

Religious criticism is successful if it clarifies exactly what is good and bad, and why that is, in such a way that people are convinced to do what religion says is the "right thing" to do. Religious criticism is often very difficult to do well, because people's spiritual beliefs are very personal and the personal meaning attached to spiritual matters may be rather unusual – it may not be so easy to understand it, it may not be so rational or logical, and it may not conform to a shared framework or shared interpretation. In addition, because it is a very personal matter, it may require a great deal of respectful sensitivity to approach a spiritual issue in a good way.

== Scholarly criticism ==
Criticism is considered "scholarly" only if it conforms to scholarly standards. A scholarly critic probes deeply into a problem, looking at all relevant evidence, the quality of reasoning involved, and the uses or purposes at stake. When he considers a problem, a scholar usually becomes familiar with the relevant background literature. He tries to make sure that he cannot be accused of inconsistent reasoning, that arguments are free from factual error, and that all relevant aims, motives, and purposes are clear. A scholar also conscientiously documents "who said what and when" so that sources for all arguments are clear. Thus, the scholar tries to be as objective and fact-based as possible.

In this way, criticism is much more difficult to ignore or to refute. Most often, a scholarly publication is refereed ("screened") by other knowledgeable scholars, who critically examine the text to find possible faults, and possibly suggest alterations. In this way, scholars always try to ensure the quality of what is said. A scholarly criticism is successful if it provides a proof or refutation that nobody can rationally deny, so that most people accepted it as definitive. Much scholarly criticism does not provide truly spectacular proofs or refutations. That is difficult to do, if many bright minds have worked or are working on the same issue – but a careful, methodically developed criticism can nevertheless contribute valuable and significant information. To substantiate even a small scholarly criticism can take much research, and can require perseverance and patience from the scholar.

A scholarly critic primarily aims to improve understanding of an issue, by means of research and the criticism of research, irrespective of any prejudices about the issue. Scholarly criticism does not mean impartiality or neutrality. Indeed, the very fact that someone has developed a scholarly criticism implies they are taking a partisan position. However, scholars usually submit their own considerations and findings to a public forum that evaluates criticisms on their merits and faults, with the explicit aim to contribute to the search for truth, and with the understanding that the criticism could be wrong. Thus, scholarly criticism involves the attitude that one is open to criticism.

What exactly the applicable "scholarly standards" for criticism are, can be open to debate. Nevertheless, participants in different academic disciplines or scientific specialisms usually operate with a reasonable amount of consensus about what the standards are. In general terms, such things as "lying, cheating, fraud, misinformation and misrepresentation" disqualify a criticism from being "scholarly". Scholarly criticism requires the greatest respect for truth, honesty in presenting a case, and a form of communication acceptable to the scholarly community.

== Critical criticism ==
Critical criticism is "criticism for the sake of criticism", or criticism which voices an objection. The term was made famous by a polemical text written by Karl Marx and Friedrich Engels entitled The Holy Family. The most popular modern form of critical criticism is contrarianism. The highest positive value of the critical critic is to be critical. To be critical, or to be a dissident is, in this case, a way of life, the highest good. Such a position is itself often criticized for its motivation. People often feel that there should be a good reason for being critical, and that being critical simply for the sake of being critical is not a good reason. Instead, it is seen as a nuisance that can lead to blithe cynicism without constructive result. If everything is demolished by criticism, there may be nothing of value left. If people's only stance is to be critical, they can be accused of only negating things, without affirming anything, which provides no positive orientation for behaviour informing people about "what to do". People don't need talk about what is not possible, they want to know what is possible.

Critical critics might respond to such an accusation, by saying that it is surely always valuable and important to highlight the limitations of ideas and happenings, and that this could not very well occur, if criticism was banned ("in a world gone mad, it makes sense to be critical"). It may be necessary to point out that things are wrong, even if it is not known how to put it right (yet). Critical critics might argue that it is necessary to be "forever on guard" against illusions, and to be "eternally vigilant" against nonsense. Without criticism, things are not relativised, or put in proportion. A typical reply to this argument is, that many illusions in the world cannot be abolished simply by criticizing them. That is, people actually have to do something positively, to establish the truth, and they cannot very well do that, if they only focus on "what is not there", or on "what is wrong". If the whole situation was turned around by taking action, there might be no need anymore for criticism. Criticism would become irrelevant or meaningless in that case.

So the means critics use may not lead to the ends they favour. Sometimes people "just have to be quiet" and take action. In that case, critical criticism itself seems to contain an ultimate limitation: to get rid of the illusion or falsehood, might require getting rid of critical criticism, or going beyond it. To persist forever in critical criticism, might itself perpetuate an illusion, and the critical critics, if they were completely consistent, might not be able to survive their own "critical attitude to everything". Or, at the very least, they would have to be critical of their own critical criticism – they might be defeated by their own stance that there is nothing immune to criticism.

== Radical and revolutionary criticism ==
The word "radical" derives from the Latin word "radix" ("root"). Thus, radical criticism means criticism that goes to the root of things, to the roots of the problem. Revolutionary criticism is criticism that aims to overturn or overthrow an existing idea or state of affairs. Thus, an existing idea may be turned upside down. Revolutionary criticism is sometimes also used in the sense of criticism that is unprecedented, or previously unheard of. Typically these kinds of criticism are associated with the youth, who are the new generation finding their identity in a battle with the older generations.

The radical critic aims to track down the most fundamental assumptions underlying an idea, position or situation in order to show the ultimate reason why it is true or false. The concern is with what something is ultimately based on. For this purpose, radical critics are not satisfied with superficial ideas. They question authority and the status quo. This presupposes the freedom to criticize, and to pursue a train of thought to its ultimate limits. Radical critics keep asking "why, why, why" very thoroughly, until they reach a complete answer to the puzzle of why things appear as they do. Radical criticism may be revolutionary, insofar as its result overthrows previous ideas with a new perspective, but it may also only demolish a particular way of seeing things, or show that an alternative way of seeing things or doing things is possible.

Radical or revolutionary criticism is often equated with political extremism, but this is not necessarily the case at all. This type of criticism may only just prove, in a "devastatingly simple" or even rather innocent way, that something is true or false, contrary to the popular perceptions or cherished beliefs. It may be "extreme", only in the sense that it falls outside the "normal" way of seeing things. If radical critics succeed in proving their case, their idea may in due course become accepted as "normal", and become an ordinary, mainstream idea. Many if not most ideas which people hold nowadays and accept as normal, originally were considered as "extremely radical", "revolutionary" or even "dangerous". It just took a long time before they became generally accepted – the radical thinker, by going beyond the ordinary, was merely ahead of the rest in grasping the essence of the matter.

So the distinction between "radical" and "normal" is, often, really only a relative one; it may have less to do with the content of ideas, than with how much they are accepted or not. Whereas the radical critic may, in his own day, be regarded as an oddball or a maverick, later on he may be hailed as a great thinker or even a genius. But this is not always the case. After all, even although radical critics may try hard, they may fail to prove the root of the matter, and thus they may be forgotten without acclaim. People may regard them only as "troublemakers".

Radical criticism can be a bit of a gamble, even if the criticism is perfectly valid. The reason is that it may open up a "can of worms" and unleash intense controversy, which can get beyond what the radical critic can handle, and which lasts for a long time. People may well know that there is a problem, but they prefer to avoid it, because they know that, if it came out into the open, it would cause a pack of trouble. Thus, when the radical critic exposes the problem or proposes a radical solution to it, people can become very agitated. To state a radical criticism often takes considerable courage, because there can be a powerful backlash to reckon with. Skilled radicals therefore try to make sure they can deal with the consequences of making their criticism. If they don't, they could be defeated by what they said.

== Conservative criticism ==
Conservative criticism is primarily concerned with conformity to a rule or principle, and continuity with the past (a tradition or heritage of some sort). Conservative critics consider that:

- everything in the world has its proper and rightful place.
- people ought to know what that place is, for their own good.
- people ought to stay in their own proper place, because they belong there.
- people should not try to leave their proper place in life, or misplace things, because that only causes trouble.
- the changes which occur, are only really variations of things which always remain the same in human existence, because "that is how people are" or "that is how society is".

Conservative criticism is therefore not necessarily "narrowminded", because knowing what the proper place of things is, might involve a vast knowledge about how things work. There may be very good reasons for keeping things as they are or were.

The most common forms of conservative criticism are that somebody is breaking with a rule, wrongly rejecting a tradition, or wrongly placing something where, they think, it does not belong. Conservative critics are as concerned with the future as anybody else, it is just that they expect no more from the future, than there has been in the past; and, to tackle the future, they believe only the "tried and tested methods" should be used. Typically conservatism is associated with older people, who "have seen it all and done it all". But conservative criticisms can be made by any kind of person, they are not automatically "conservatives" because they make a conservative criticism.

Conservative criticism has nothing much to do with "left-wing" or "right-wing", because left-wing people are often very conservative, in the defined sense, while right-wing people can also be very radical, in the defined sense. The difference between "radical" and "conservative" has more to do with the belief in whether a change to something genuinely new is really possible and necessary. Radicals typically believe strongly that such change is highly desirable and necessary, and that it can be achieved. Their criticism is that there is not enough change. Conservative critics, by contrast, are very skeptical about any such change, because they feel the change is really "just another form" of something that already exists.

The conservative criticism is typically that there has already been too much change, of the wrong kind, and that this change has led people astray – that people should return to how things were always done in the past. A return to the 'correct' tradition, 'correct' ways of the past, is the only big change many conservative critics are interested in.

Conservative critics may well recognize that important changes do occur, it is merely that whatever the changes, those changes do not and cannot alter the eternal conditions of human existence. "Details" may change, but "in essence" the human predicament remains the same as it has always been. So conservative critics typically emphasize continuity over change. They believe it is just not possible to change human existence very radically, whatever the appearance. Conservative criticism therefore says that, when people claim they are doing something new or have changed things, this is just spurious and superficial, because, in essence, things stay much as they always have been. People may think they are innovating, but in reality most of it has been done before.

A true conservative critic does not think in terms of "living for the moment", but in terms of years, decades, centuries and eternity. He criticizes on the basis of long-lasting principles. The ultimate aim of conservative criticism is to achieve stability, so that things stay in the place where they belong, orderly and peacefully. This is logical, because it fits with the idea that human beings quite simply "are as they are" – and that this will never change. Resistance to this reality, the conservative feels, is not only useless, but also just makes people unhappy; "you can't change human nature".

Conservative criticism can be effective, if it is feasible to keep things the way they are, or to return to a traditional way of doing things. It is usually not effective, if change is absolutely unavoidable and inevitable, or if it is impossible to go back to the way of doing things in the past. However, even if change cannot be avoided, there may be several different options for how to approach it, and conservative critics are then likely to choose a "conservative option".

== Liberal criticism ==
Liberal criticism is primarily concerned with people's rights (including human rights) and freedoms, with whether people are taking responsibility for their choices or not, and with the limits of toleration. Liberal critics believe that:

- Interests, needs, and rights of autonomous individuals are most important, not group entities (except if they are groups of recognizable individuals).
- People should be free to make their own choices, and should take responsibility for those choices.
- People should have equal opportunities in the marketplace.
- People should be rewarded according to the merits of what they achieve, not according to their status, or inherited privileges.
- People are entitled to a private sphere of their own, i.e., a distinction should be made between private and public life.

Liberal criticism focuses on making sure that all the conditions exist in which individuals can develop, flourish and prosper successfully, as independent people, with a minimum of constraints. Liberals therefore criticize anything that gets in the way of this. People's rights, privacy and choices should be respected as much as possible, and obstacles to a free life should be attacked and removed. Liberals are in favour of pluralism: nobody has a monopoly on the truth, and other, different voices should be heard. At the same time, people should be prevented from interfering too much in other people's lives. If people make the wrong choices, or if they don't take responsibility for their own choices and their own lives, they should be criticized for that. If people are unfairly shut out from opportunities, or if they are unfairly rewarded, liberals often criticize it. Liberal criticism is associated especially with young adults who are starting to make their own way in life, on their own strength.

Liberal criticism can often become extraordinarily complex and subtle, involving very fine distinctions. The reason is that the interests, rights and obligations of individuals constantly have to be weighed against the interests, rights and obligations of other individuals. Rules and principles have to be created so that individuals are not too constrained, but also that they are prevented from interfering unduly in the lives of others. People should be "free, but not too free". People are "too free" when they become irresponsible, anti-social and arbitrary, i.e., when they fail to regulate their own behaviour appropriately, and have to be regulated by others. Liberal criticism is therefore always very concerned with finding the right kind of balance, or the right nuance, which would (ideally) express a situation of harmony among individuals (or expresses the best way to regard something). Liberals accept that conflicts always occur, but conflicts should be kept within certain bounds, and methods should be found to resolve them fairly. Much liberal criticism is devoted to defining exactly "what should be tolerated and what should not be tolerated", and explaining why that is.

- At its best, liberal criticism takes a "liberal" view of human beings, meaning that it is sufficiently open-minded to consider issues in a very comprehensive way, from all different angles. It allows people enough freedom to try out something new, tolerates differences of opinion, and lets people learn from their mistakes.
- At worst, liberal criticism "misses the wood for the trees" because, by focusing on individuals and individual solutions, it overlooks the "bigger picture", or fails to understand the meaning of people's social coexistence. Liberals often cannot imagine anything beyond individuals, and therefore, when they have to describe the total situation in which individuals have to operate (social systems, macro-realities or collectivities), their perspective may become eclectic, fragmented or particularist.
- Generally, liberal critics believe that the world would be better off if everyone is a liberal; but if they are driven into a corner by the criticisms of others, i.e., if they are robbed of their freedom in some sense, they can also become very anti-liberal and despotic – at least until such time as their own liberal way of being is tolerated again.
- Liberal criticism typically does not work well, when the interests of the people concerned are mutually exclusive, and cannot be reconciled at all. Liberal criticism usually assumes that people are sufficiently flexible to be willing to discuss, negotiate or compromise about something, i.e., that people have an attitude of "give and take".

== Speculative criticism ==
Speculative criticism is criticism which focuses on what something "might, could, or ought to" mean, or what "might, could, or ought to" follow from it. It might also focus on the "probable" or "likely" meaning of something, or the "probable" or "likely" consequences of it. Speculative criticism usually occurs in the absence of (enough) evidence that would decide an issue. It goes "beyond the facts", because the facts available (if any) are not conclusive. Thus, speculative criticisms usually occur when things are either not certain, definite or fixed (yet), or when multiple different meanings are possible. Since most people have to deal with some uncertainties in their daily lives, and have to interpret things without (yet) knowing the details of the full story, they entertain speculative thoughts as a normal everyday occurrence . For example, if somebody is thinking of buying a used car, he or she might think of what "might" be right or wrong with it, without knowing for sure.

A speculative criticism often takes the form that "if we assumed such-and-such, then it would seem that a consequence (desirable or undesirable) would follow". Yet whether the assumption is valid, remains uncertain. Whether the inference made on the strength of the assumption is valid, may likewise be uncertain. The speculative critic imagines different positive and negative scenarios which could be applicable, if certain conditions are assumed to exist. Or, somebody might say, "intuitively I would object to such a statement", without definite grounds or reliable information being available. Something could be "plausible" (on the face of it, it makes sense), but not (yet) "provable". There could "probably" be something wrong with a thing or idea, without definite proof that it is wrong.

Speculative criticism is often criticized precisely because it is speculative, i.e., because relevant evidence is unavailable, or because the criticism is made before "the evidence is in." In this case, the criticism is considered to lack any solid basis. For example, politicians (or political commentators) might dismiss "speculative newspaper stories" because they believe that these stories are just "spin" based on gossip and hearsay, and not based on any "hard evidence".

Nevertheless, speculative criticism can play an important role (e.g., in research, in art, in hermeneutics and in literary theory), because the same information can be "read" in different ways, and read in different ways by different people. What the information means, is in this case not fixed; it is open to interpretation, it has different meanings, and it may be, that what it means can only be established by interacting with the information. By means of speculative criticism, it is established what the information could possibly mean, perhaps as a prologue to more thorough verification. For example, when archaeologists find some very old bones, they might debate their hunches about the civilization of the people to whom the bones belonged. In all sorts of fields of human endeavour, it can be important and valuable to establish, through criticisms, what the possible significance of something is. Speculative criticism does not necessarily assume that things mean "anything you like". It may only be that the significance of something could be interpreted in a limited number of different ways.

Speculative criticism can be useful and credible, if people have to evaluate situations where there are unknowns, uncertainties, novelties or different possibilities (see also brainstorming). It is not very credible, when a definite answer could easily be obtained, "if only" the speculative critics bothered to do a bit of thinking and fact-finding themselves, and if they verified the claims being made properly.

== Foolish criticism ==
Foolish criticism is unclear about what the motive or purpose of the criticism is, or about what the consequence or effect of the criticism is. Usually it connotes lack of self-insight or a good understanding of the motives or issue involved. The foolish critic often mistakes what his target should be, and therefore, his criticism is really "at the wrong address", it is in some sense misplaced, disingenuous or misjudged ("clutching at straws", "tilting at windmills", "Red herring").

Foolish criticism is not necessarily arbitrary or willy-nilly, but it is "foolish", because it does the critic (or his intended target) no good. Typically it is therefore self-defeating, which might make people wonder why it is being stated at all. People can become terribly obsessed with a criticism, without really being aware of what it is truly about, why it is being made, or what the effect of it is. They might feel they should "pipe in" about an issue, without any awareness of a clear motivation.

Foolish criticism may lack any clear direction, being prompted simply by a grudge or gripe, a feeling of unease, or a sense of dissatisfaction. People often say, "don't criticize, what you don't understand", meaning that first people should understand things and their effects properly, before launching into criticism. If they do not, the criticism might "backfire" and have an effect which is opposite to what is intended. Criticism is truly foolish, if people persist in a criticism regardless, even though it is demonstrably not well-taken.

Foolish criticism is sometimes also interpreted as comical criticism ("critical foolery" or "fooling around with criticism") where the critic aims to entertain with his criticism.

Foolish criticism usually means that the criticism and the critic are not taken seriously by people who understand what the issue is about; thus, the criticism may have no other effect than that it makes people laugh, shrug or feel annoyed. People may acknowledge that a criticism is "brave" (they credit the critic with the courage to make a criticism), but also that it is "foolish" (because, by making it, the critic sacrifices something important which he did not need to do).

== Professional criticism ==
The term "professional criticism" is applied in several ways.

- Criticism which is professionally done - this implies that it is expertly done, and could hardly be improved. That usually means that it is so well-designed, that nobody can deny it, and that people feel something necessarily has to be done about it.
- Criticism which is offered by a professional, rather than an amateur or layman. Somebody may offer a criticism "in his professional capacity", meaning that he bases himself on his professional experience with the subject of the criticism. This does not, however, automatically mean that the criticism is good.
- Somebody is being criticized, because he has flouted a professional standard. Normally, a skilled occupation or a profession has a set of standards, which aims to ensure the quality of work. If the standards were not there, the goods and services supplied would be shoddy, useless or unsafe. Professionals learn what the standard is, through training and education, and they explain relevant aspects of that standard to the people they supervise. The standards can include a code of ethics, rules for behaviour, technical norms and procedures, legal rules, etc. It is expected that people who work in a profession really follow the standards of that profession. If they do not, they can be criticized for this failure. In that case, their behaviour is regarded as "not professional" or "unprofessional".
- The criticism of professionals or the criticism of a profession may occur, sometimes in a somewhat humorous, or satirical way. It could be done by professionals themselves, or by amateurs or laypersons. In this case, there is some skepticism about what the status of "being professional" actually adds to solving a problem, or there is skepticism about the claims made by a profession about how it can contribute to solving a problem. It is often implied here, that the standards of professionals do no justice to a specific situation, or that there is a case of professional cretinism: the professional gets it wrong, because he is unable to think outside of his own profession (he is imprisoned in a framework that does not lead to a solution).

Not infrequently, some of these different senses of professional criticism are mixed together, especially when people try to pretend somebody's criticism is authoritative (they seem to have a professional expertise, although they really lack this expertise), or when people try to pretend that somebody's criticism is not authoritative (they are treated as no better than the rest, although in reality they are highly professional, and more competent and experienced than the rest).

== Literary criticism ==
Literary criticism is the comparison, analysis, interpretation, and/or evaluation of works of literature. It is essentially an opinion, supported by evidence, relating to theme, style, setting or historical or political context. It includes discussion of the work’s content along with critic's insights gained from research. This may have a positive or a negative bias and may be a study of an individual piece of literature or an author’s body of work.

Literary criticism is not limited to plot summaries, biographies of authors, or finding faults with the literature. Researching, reading, and writing works of literary criticism helps in making better sense of the work, form judgments about literature, study ideas from different points of view, and determine on an individual level whether a literary work is worth reading.

Popular examples of literary criticism include biographical, comparative, ethical, expressive, historical, mimetic, pragmatic, social, and theoretical among others.

== Self-criticism ==
Self-criticism (or what academics sometimes call "autocritique") refers to the ability to appraise the pros and cons of one's own beliefs, thoughts, actions, behaviour or results, especially from the point of view of how others might regard them. The self-criticism might occur in private, or it might happen in a group discussion. Sometimes the self-criticism is aired publicly, specifically to show people that a person or group no longer believes in something which it formerly did; at other times, the self-criticism remains a hidden secret behind closed doors.

Self-criticism requires a certain flexibility of mind, because it assumes a person is able to call into question his own behaviour and thinking – instead of believing that he "naturally" is the way he is, or that he can "never be wrong". Often it requires that people are able to "step outside themselves", and see themselves from a different perspective. The self-critic is willing to search for, recognize, and accept objections against his own behavior, or his own characteristics; he is willing to accept that he could be wrong, or indeed that he is in the wrong.

Self-criticism can be very difficult, for several reasons.

- People can be very resistant to admitting they are wrong about something, or that they did (or said) the wrong thing. They like to believe they got it right, even when others disagree. Acknowledging that they got it wrong, could be very embarrassing, confusing or distressing – especially if they personally invested a lot in the wrong idea. Their whole world might crumble.
- People might have "blind spots" in their awareness, i.e., they are simply unable to see a part of themselves for what it is (unless others point it out to them). In that case, they are unable to criticize themselves, because they don't know what there is to criticize.
- If people did engage in self-criticism, others might interpret it as a sign of weakness ("you got it wrong, so why should I take you seriously?"). Thus, the self-critic might no longer have the same confidence, or become vulnerable to attack from others.

Self-criticism is an essential component of learning. In order to be able to change one's behaviour, improve one's style, and adjust to a new situation, it is necessary to recognize personal errors as errors. Once the errors are known, something can be done about them; a different path can be pursued. One also needs to be able to tell the difference between success and failure, and not mistake one for the other. Only then is it possible to truly "learn from one's mistakes." Often, the most challenging part is to know what exactly the mistake or success consists in. The aim of self-criticism is to find all that out, aided by memory.

People sometimes say, "its about the criticism that gets me". This is especially true of self-criticism. Usually people are only prepared to criticize themselves within certain limits, otherwise it becomes confusing, disorienting, or even lethal. If a person arrives at the conclusion that most of what he is about is wrong, he can be plunged into a disorienting chaos, where he is unable to evaluate things properly anymore. Thus, while most people regard self-criticism as healthy, as a sign of good character, and as necessary for learning, excessive or enforced self-criticism is regarded as unhealthy (as destructive for the individual). The ultimate self-criticism can be a final self-attack through deliberate suicide. Suicidal persons are willing to give up their right to exist, they no longer believe their life is worth living. Thus, it is possible to be "too hard on oneself", leading to self-destructive behaviour.

== See also ==
- Critic
- Critical theory
- Criticism
- Critique
- List of fallacies
