= We are not Neutral =

International conference

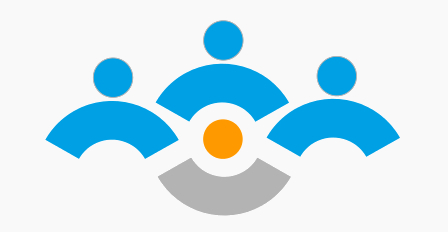
- Status: active
- Genre: Conference
- Begins: 7 November 2014
- Ends: 9 November 2014
- Locations: HKD, Rijeka
- Most recent: 4 July 2014
- Attendance: 200
- Organiser: Onetius
- Website: facebook.com/WeAreNotNeutral

We are not Neutral is a conference series sponsored by the Onetius. It is a first international conference series in Southern Europe that promotes creativity and freedom of speech.
Majority of speakers are students who are ready to speak out about topics that are usually on the margins of our society. All of the talks are streamed online to further promote ideas that stand behind the conference and also to give people around the World to tune in and leave their opinions about these topics.

== Conferences ==
=== We are not Neutral Genesis ===
First instalment of We are not Neutral conference was held on 4 July 2014 in Rijeka, Croatia. All speeches were streamed online and thus encouraging public discussions on all of these topics.

Vedran Miletic spoke about Cloud services and Net Neutrality - what are problems behind Net Neutrality, current palette of cloud services and how Net Neutrality works with them.
Armando Vega talked about whistleblowing and the current state on privacy.
Diana Kovacic gave an overview of social networks and their implications on human lives.
