= Hakbang ng Maisug =

Philippine volunteer organization supports Rodrigo Duterte

- Formation: January 24, 2024; 2 years ago (as a peace rally movement)
- Founded at: Davao City, Philippines
- Type: Political volunteer organization

Hakbang ng Maisug (lit. 'Step of the brave') is a Filipino organization, only started as a peace rally movement supporting Rodrigo and Sara Duterte. It condemns the governance of Dutertes' former ally President Bongbong Marcos.

== Rallies ==
Additional nationwide protests were held in Dumaguete, Tagum, and Angeles by Duterte and Quiboloy's supporters, who voiced their grievances against the Marcos administration. Among these grievances were their opposition to proposed constitutional amendments and to the increased US military presence in the country, as well as denouncement of perceived censorship under the administration.

At one rally, Duterte accused Marcos of plotting to extend his term beyond the current term limit of the Constitution, and of being a drug addict. Marcos responded by alleging Duterte's previous use of fentanyl as a painkiller impaired his judgment; Duterte later dared Marcos to undergo a drug test with him at Luneta Park.

Frustrated by the administration's use of taxpayers' money, Duterte initially revived calls advocated by former House Speaker Pantaleon Alvarez for Mindanao to secede from the Philippines, His calls drew disapproval from several lawmakers and former Muslim rebels, prompting Duterte to later retract his calls, saying he only wanted "a better deal for Mindanao".

Despite success in holding some rallies, a few suffered setbacks and cancellations after the rally venues were allegedly blocked by the Marcos administration, drawing condemnation from Duterte and his allies. Despite his criticisms against Marcos, Duterte clarified the prayer rallies were not meant to overthrow the administration, but warned Marcos of extending his six-year term, reminding him of his father's fate.
