= EDSA-pwera =

Political television ad in the Philippines

- Agency: Undisclosed
- Client: People's Initiative for Reform Modernization and Action
- Market: Philippines
- Language: Filipino
- Media: Television
- Running time: 60 seconds
- Product: Charter change movement
- Release date: January 9, 2024
- Country: Philippines

A television commercial known for its usage of the "EDSA-pwera" (Note: Portmanteau of EDSA, the roadway associated with the People Power Revolution and the Filipino-language colloquialism etsapwera or echapwera which means to be "left out".) wordplay was released on January 9, 2024, on various television channels in the Philippines advocating for charter change or reform of the 1987 Constitution of the Philippines.

The commercial received criticism after it was perceived to be an attack on the legacy of the People Power Revolution.

== Advertisement ==
Pangako nila… Pagsulong. Pero sa pagbuo ng 1987 Constitution, na Edsa-pwera tayo

Their promise... Progress. But in the drafting of the 1987 Constitution we [Filipino people] were left out.

— Excerpt

The EDSA-pwera advertisement was 60 seconds long. A voiceover proposes that the 1987 Constitution should be amended, reasoning that ordinary people have been left out of the progress since the 1986 People Power Revolution. It was first released on January 9, 2024, on various Philippine television channels by ABS-CBN, GMA, and TV5.

The law firm of Gana Atienza Avisado paid for the ad on behalf of the group People's Initiative for Reform Modernization and Action (PIRMA), which maintains that it was wholly funded privately. PIRMA said that the concept behind the ad was by their advertising agency. The group's lead convenor, Noel Oñate, confirmed that the advertisement cost ₱55 million, adding that he had personally shouldered half of its costs. At a Senate hearing, he refused to divulge the names of donors to the campaign, adding that the ensuing controversy led to some of them withdrawing up to ₱28 million in donations. A subsequent investigation also found that PIRMA's registration had been revoked by the Securities and Exchange Commission in 2004 due to non-submission of annual reports and other requirements.

== Reception ==
The advertisement was subject to scrutiny in the House of Representatives. Liberal Party president and Albay representative Edcel Lagman found the advertisement "crudely crafted" and "devoid of substance". He alleged that the usage of "ESDA-pwera" in the ad is a way to discredit the People Power Revolution. France Castro of the Alliance of Concerned Teachers questioned if the video was funded by public funds, which PIRMA denied.

== See also ==
- 2024 constitutional reform attempts in the Philippines
- Historical distortion regarding Ferdinand Marcos
- People's initiative
