= 2024 constitutional reform attempts in the Philippines =

Efforts to amend the constitution

Several attempts to enact constitutional reform have taken place in the Philippines in 2024. This originated with President Bongbong Marcos and his allies' efforts.

The political dispute has been characterized by the conflict between the upper and lower houses of the Congress of the Philippines. The House of Representatives is in favor of amending the constitution, while the Senate is opposed to it, with the latter being supported by several high profile politicians such as Marcos' predecessor Rodrigo Duterte.

== Background ==
=== Charter change in the Philippines ===
Constitutional reform in the Philippines, commonly referred to as charter change or colloquially as cha-cha, involves the political and legal procedures required to modify the existing 1987 Constitution of the Philippines. According to the interpretation of the Constitution, amendments can be proposed through one of three approaches: a people's initiative, a constituent assembly, or a constitutional convention.

The first attempt to amend the 1987 Constitution was under President Fidel V. Ramos. Among the proposed changes in the constitution were a shift to a senatorial system and the lifting of term limits of public officials. Ramos argued that the changes would bring more accountability, continuity, and responsibility to the "gridlock"-prone Philippine version of the presidential bicameral system. Some politically active religious groups, opposition politicians, business tycoons and left-wing organizations opposed the process that was supposed to lead to a national referendum. Critics argued that the proposed constitutional changes for one would benefit the incumbent, Ramos. On September 21, 1997, a church-organized rally brought in an estimated half a million people to Rizal Park.

Amid impeachment complaints during her presidency, President Gloria Macapagal Arroyo called for a shift to a parliamentary system, stating the Philippine political system "has now become a hindrance to our national progress".

During the presidency of Rodrigo Duterte, discussions and proposals related to charter change began as Duterte expressed support for amending the constitution to shift the country's government system to a federal republic. However, the push for federalism was put on hold in 2019 after heavy political division and disagreements within his administration and among his political allies.

==== People's Initiative ====
The people's initiative (PI) outlines the procedures for constituents to propose amendments to the constitution through a petition process. The process is summarized as:

- A petition for a people's initiative must be signed by at least 12% of the total number of registered voters, with each legislative district represented by at least 3% of its registered voters.
- The Commission on Elections (COMELEC) verifies the authenticity of the signatures and ensures that the petition complies with the requirements set by law.
- If the petition is deemed valid, the proposed constitutional amendment is subjected to a national referendum. A majority vote in favor is needed for the amendment to be ratified.

==== Marcos administration ====
President Bongbong Marcos has been a major supporter of charter change, running as a candidate for the Partido Federal ng Pilipinas during the 2022 presidential election, which supports changing the system of government to a federal republic. During his presidency, Marcos said that the country has "taken steps" towards a shift to federalism.

== Timeline ==
=== PI movement and alleged bribery ===
In January 2024, the People's Initiative for Reform Modernization and Action (PIRMA) initiated a PI attempt. The proponents suggested that both chambers of Congress, the House of Representatives and the Senate, should vote jointly on the proposed amendments in a constitutional assembly. However, the 24-member Senate has opposed the proposal, as its vote would be outweighed by the 316-member House of Representatives.

The effort gained controversy when Albay Representative Edcel Lagman revealed constituents were allegedly offered ₱100 to ₱10,000 for their signatures. Some constituents also claimed that they were not informed that they were signing forms relating to constitutional change and instead were told that the forms were for government subsidy. On January 9, president Marcos' sister, Senator Imee Marcos disclosed that up to ₱20 million was allegedly offered to each congressional district that could deliver the required number of signatures that support the Charter change pushed in the House. While the proponents claimed that they have achieved the minimum 12 percent national voter threshold on January 23, COMELEC suspended the proceedings due to the alleged reports of bribery.

Amidst the controversy, Bongbong Marcos said that while he is in favor of charter change and PI, reiterated that he only supports changes in the constitution's economic provisions and not political ones. Imee Marcos accused House Speaker Martin Romualdez of spearheading the initiative for Charter change and questioned the initiative's motives, saying the restrictive economic provisions have already been addressed in the past Congress through the enactment of the Retail Trade Act, Foreign Investments Act, and Public Service Act. During a hearing by the Senate Committee on Electoral Reforms and People's Participation on January 31, PIRMA lead convenor Noel Oñate admitted discussing with Romualdez about the PI and claimed responsibility for a signature drive campaign, but denied the allegations of bribery.

On another hearing in February 2, witnesses from Davao City said that they were promised government aid through aid program of the Department of Labor and Employment and the Department of Social Welfare and Development as well as ₱4,000 in cash in exchange for their signatures in the PI forms. Rene Estorpe, the barangay captain of Agdao Centro, claimed these promises came from the PBA Partylist, a party-list political party representing the country's athletes. A PBA party-list coordinator from barangay San Antonio admitted to distributing coupons for government aid to lure people in her village to sign for the PI forms. Marikina Mayor Marcelino Teodoro ordered the arrest of people found offering money to residents in exchange for their signatures for the PI forms.

Catholic Bishops' Conference of the Philippines President Pablo Virgilio David warned the public about the potential deception in the gathering of signatures for the people's initiative, suggesting the PI was mainly driven by "a few public servants and not truly the initiative of ordinary citizens". Retired Chief Justice Hilario Davide Jr., a member of the 1986 Constitutional Commission that crafted the 1987 Constitution, opposed proposed amendments and revisions to the charter, describing such proposals as a "lethal experiment, a fatal hit, [and] a plunge to death"; he also warned against amending the "restrictive economic provisions" of the Constitution, saying that "the day will not be far when public utilities and advertising industries will be under control or even under the full ownership of aliens".

=== Removal of term limits ===
On January 18, the University of the Philippines (UP) Office of the Faculty Regent, All UP Academic Employees Union, and Altermidya held the Birdtalk 2024 Yearstarter, where Ibon Foundation economists questioned the economic arguments for charter change. The proposals according to Sonny Africa of Ibon will not resolve but will only worsen the country's economic crisis. Africa stated that foreign investments have short-term gains but hinder long-term national development. Africa said that charter change proposals also carry hidden motives through which Marcos and his political allies aim to remain in power.

In February, political scientist Aries Arugay called charter change a "Trojan horse" that aims to allow the removal of term limits for the Philippine president. In March, human rights group Hustisya said that charter change could bring about another dictatorship, referring to the dictatorship of Ferdinand Marcos, and more human rights abuses. Hustisya also compared the human rights abuses under Ferdinand Marcos and Bongbong Marcos.

=== Davao City prayer rally ===
A prayer rally was held in Davao City on January 28, only hours after the Marcos administration's Bagong Pilipinas rally, in opposition to the PI and charter change. The prayer rally was notable for the attendance of high profile politicians such as former president Rodrigo Duterte, vice president Sara Duterte, Imee Marcos, Davao City mayor Sebastian Duterte, Bongbong Marcos' former executive secretary Vic Rodriguez, and former presidential spokesperson Harry Roque.

During the rally, Rodrigo Duterte accused Marcos of consolidating power for himself and his allies by attempting to increase the term limits of the president and members of congress, and warned that Marcos will "suffer the same fate as his father," referencing the overthrow of former president and dictator Ferdinand Marcos Sr. through the People Power Revolution in 1986. Duterte also accused Marcos, First Lady Liza Araneta Marcos, and Speaker Romualdez of orchestrating the PI and called on the Armed Forces of the Philippines (AFP) and the Philippine National Police to "protect the constitution"; he also vowed to arrest the proponents of the PI if he were to ever return to power.

Rodrigo Duterte accused Marcos of being a drug addict, claiming that Marcos' name was on the list of drug personalities published by the Philippine Drug Enforcement Agency (PDEA) during his tenure as mayor of Davao, and also alleged that those in government and the AFP has knowledge of Marcos' drug addiction. However, this was later denied by PDEA, who said that Marcos was never in their list of drug personalities since the database was established in 2002. In response to Duterte's accusation, Marcos sarcastically said that Duterte's judgment was allegedly affected by his use of fentanyl, in which he said Duterte has been taking for the last five years. Duterte replied saying the drug was prescribed by a doctor to relieve pain from injuries he sustained from a past motorcycle accident; he also suggested that Marcos take a public drug test in Luneta Park together with him.

Sebastian Duterte demanded Marcos' resignation during a political forum held at the same day, accusing him of laziness and incompetence. According to Imee Marcos, Duterte later retracted the statement and apologized. However, Duterte clarified that he was not apologizing to president Marcos and he was only apologizing to Imee Marcos "out of pity" and demanded she stop "using him" for political statements.

=== Mindanao secession calls ===
On January 30, Rodrigo Duterte expressed frustration on how the government uses resources and taxpayers' money and revived an initiative that Davao del Norte Representative and former House Speaker Pantaleon Alvarez advocated for political forces from Mindanao to start a movement for a "separate and independent Mindanao". Duterte said that Alvarez will head the independence movement and further explained that the movement will not start a rebellion nor will it cause "bloodshed" but will follow international laws to achieve its goal. Alvarez thanked Romualdez, explaining the ongoing PI has added fuel to renewed calls for Mindanao independence.

Duterte's declaration drew wide disapproval; Senate president Migz Zubiri and minority leader Koko Pimentel, both natives of Mindanao, condemned Duterte's plan, with the latter stating that the "last thing that we want is for our country to be chaotic and divided." Former Moro separatist group Moro National Liberation Front (MNLF) rejected Duterte's call for independence, with deputy speaker of the Interim Bangsamoro Parliament Omar Yasser Sema saying that "secession is not the solution to this current problem." The National Security Council through National Security Adviser Eduardo Año said that any attempt of secession "will be met by the government with resolute force, as it remains steadfast in securing the sovereignty and integrity of the national territory". Presidential peace adviser and former AFP Chief of Staff Carlito Galvez Jr. urged the public to "turn away from any call or movement that aims to destabilize our beloved nation", saying such calls would only lead to destabilizing the country. Murad Ebrahim, Interim Chief Minister of the Bangsamoro Autonomous Region in Muslim Mindanao (BARMM) and chair of another former Moro separatist group, the Moro Islamic Liberation Front (MILF) called for strengthened support behind Marcos and the Philippine government "to allow peace and civility to reign over the affairs of our land". Camiguin Governor Xavier Jesus Romualdo and Camiguin Representative Jurdin Jesus Romualdo said that Duterte could be held criminally liable for sedition following his calls for Mindanao secession. In response, Duterte's former presidential spokesperson Salvador Panelo called the fierce comments and threats to seize Duterte "overreacting" and said that Duterte's remarks about secession was "just an idea".

On February 8, Marcos described the efforts at secession as being "doomed to fail for it is anchored on a false premise, not to mention a sheer Constitutional travesty," and pledged to uphold the Constitution. On February 21, Lanao del Norte representative Mohamad Khalid Dimaporo said that 53 out of 60 members of the House of Representatives from Mindanao had signed a manifesto rejecting Duterte's secession proposal.

On February 27, Duterte retracted his calls for the secession of Mindanao, saying that it was a bluff and a "joke" to get the attention of "Manila". He further explained that he does not want the Philippines to be dismembered, and that he wanted "a better deal for Mindanao".

=== Senate and House impasse ===
On February 5, the House of Representatives passed House Resolution 156, pledging loyalty to Speaker Romualdez; the resolution also stated that the Senate supposedly violated the principle of inter-parliamentary courtesy and interfered with the House's affairs when the Senate conducted hearings on PI. Senior Deputy Speaker Aurelio Gonzales Jr. defended the resolution after Senate President Zubiri and Senators Jinggoy Estrada and Joel Villanueva took offense at the resolution.

On February 13, several senators questioned a new ₱26.7 billion cash assistance program of the Department of Social Welfare and Development (DSWD) named "Ayuda sa Kapos ang Kita Program" (AKAP), which they described as a "foreign project". DSWD Undersecretary for Legislative affairs Fatima Aliah Dimaporo said the project was also "just as foreign" to the DSWD and that the project was not part of the original budget proposal for 2024 from Malacañang. Senator Imee Marcos said she learned about the program from a congressman who sent her a text message saying "All soft projects including AKAP must go through the Office of the Speaker. AKAP, AICS, TUPAD, MAIP for the PI and other efforts". Senator Sonny Angara, chair of the Senate finance committee, said the AKAP program was initiated by the House. In response, House appropriations chairman Elizaldy Co, said Imee Marcos was tarnishing the good intention of the program.

=== Marcos backs economic charter change ===
On February 8, President Marcos, in a speech to the Philippine Constitution Association (Philconsa) during the occasion of Constitution Day in Makati, expressed full support for efforts to amend the 1987 Constitution. Following Marcos' announcement, senior deputy house speaker Aurelio Gonzales Jr. and House Ways and Means Committee Chair Joey Salceda said that the chamber would limit its proposed amendments of the constitution to economic aspects in accordance with the president's wishes.

=== Resolution of Both Houses No. 6 and 7 ===
In an attempt to hasten the resolution of reforms in the Constitution, the House of Representatives approved Resolution of Both Houses No. 7 (RBH 7), an almost exact copy of RBH 6 which was earlier filed by Senate President Migz Zubiri and Senators Loren Legarda and Sonny Angara. The proposed amendments are on the ownership of and grant of legislative franchises to public utilities in Article XII, basic education in Article XIV, and advertising in Article XVI. The main suggested amendments center around the insertion of the phrase "unless otherwise provided by law", allowing Congress to lift or relax present economic restrictions in the Constitution, and the addition of the qualifier "basic" in Article XIV.

=== Possible environmental impacts ===
Environmentalists and Indigenous rights activists said that charter change could worsen destructive mining and its impacts on vulnerable communities. Youth Advocates for Climate Action Philippines (YACAP) said that charter change aimed to make it easier for foreign companies to engage in destructive mining, which will worsen river contamination, human rights abuses, militarization, and displacement of communities. Environmental groups said that charter change would lead to reclassification and privatization of remaining ecosystems and affect livelihoods of farmers, fishers, and Indigenous peoples. The groups' unity statement said, "Cha-cha alone is not sufficient to effectively address the complex political, socio-economic, and environmental challenges our country has been facing; instead, we need holistic solutions that address both social and ecological issues faced by communities on the ground".

Alyansa Tigil Mina said that constitutional amendments would make the Philippines vulnerable to destructive exploitation by foreign corporations motivated by "profit over environmental protection and people’s welfare". The group said that the expansion of mining by foreign companies would destroy rivers, forests, mountains, and communities, worsen climate change impacts, destroy livelihoods, create health problems, and lead to human rights abuses. Kalikasan People's Network for the Environment said that multinational corporations have already abused the current legal framework, citing as examples environmental damage linked to OceanaGold's mining operations and Boskalis company's dredging and reclamation in Manila Bay.

Indigenous rights group KATRIBU Kalipunan ng Katutubong Mamamayan ng Pilipinas said that giving 100% ownership to foreign firms would result in land dispossession of Indigenous peoples and the loss of livelihoods and cultural heritage.

=== Gadon's proposals ===
On April 1, Presidential Adviser on Poverty Alleviation Larry Gadon wrote a letter to Speaker Romualdez and Senate President Zubiri unveiling his proposals for amending the political provisions of the Constitution. These involved doubling the membership of the Senate to 48 senators to "increase efficiency" by reducing the numbers of committee assignments per legislator and switching to a parliamentary form of government. In response, Zubiri cited recent opinion polls showing widespread disapproval for charter change in saying that such amendments would only further dampen support for it. Congressman Rufus Rodriguez, who heads the House of Representatives' panel on constitutional reform, advised Romualdez to ignore Gadon's proposals and reiterated the President Marcos and the House's support for economic amendments only.

=== Bulacan peace rally ===
In late April 2024, a peace rally intended to defend the Constitution and criticize the "excesses” made by the Marcos administration was planned by former President Rodrigo Duterte's supporters to be held in Bustos, Bulacan. Duterte called his supporters to attend the rally saying "If you are brave, for the country, defend the flag, and the Constitution, and attend the peace rally to show your anger". The rally was later cancelled, allegedly under the Marcos administration's obstruction and harassment.

=== Zubiri's resignation ===
On May 20, Migz Zubiri resigned as Senate president following what he called were attacks against him that began following his opposition to the People's Initiative. President Bongbong Marcos subsequently expressed support for Zubiri's replacement, Francis Escudero.

== Opinion polling ==
In a face-to-face survey of 1,200 respondents conducted by Pulse Asia from March 6 to 10, 2024, at least 88% of respondents said that they were against amending the 1987 Constitution, with only 8% supporting and the remaining 4% uncertain. However, House deputy speaker David C. Suarez and House majority floor leader Manuel Dalipe disputed the survey, alleging that it uses "biased and leading questions" which they said could have influenced the outcome of the survey. In another mobile-based survey conducted by data research firm Tangere from October 14-16, 2024, 61.9% of 1,500 participants expressed support for the proposed constitutional amendment on economic reforms.

== See also ==
- EDSA-pwera
