= List of executive orders by Bongbong Marcos =

Listed below are executive orders signed by Philippine President Bongbong Marcos. Executive Order(s) (EO) are issued by the President to help officials and agencies in the operations management of the Executive Branch of the Philippine Government. He signed a total of 97 Executive Orders to date.

Republic Acts, Executive Orders (including the Implementing Rules and Regulations (IRRs)), Proclamations, Administrative Orders (& IRRs), Memorandum Circulars, and Memorandum Orders are all compiled and published by the Official Gazette.

== Executive orders ==
=== 2022 ===
No.	Title / Description	Date signed	Ref.
1	Abolishing the Presidential Anti Corruption Commission and the Office of the Cabinet Secretary.	June 30, 2022	
2	Reorganizing and Renaming the Presidential Communications Operations Office and its Attached Agencies into the Office of the Press Secretary, Abolishing the Office of the Presidential Spokesperson, and for Other Purposes	June 30, 2022	
3	Allowing voluntary wearing of facemasks in outdoor settings and reiterating the continued implementation of minimum public health standards during the state of public health emergency relative to the COVID-19 pandemic	September 12, 2022	
4	Directing the implementation of a moratorium on the payment of the principal obligation and interest of the amortization due and payable by agrarian reform beneficiaries	September 13, 2022	
5	Transferring the attachment of Technical Education and Skills Development Authority from the Department of Trade and Industry to the Department of Labor and Employment	September 16, 2022	
6	Amending the composition of the Inter-Cabinet Cluster Mechanism on Normalization established under Executive Order No. 79 (s. 2019), entitled “Implementing the Annex on Normalization under the Comprehensive Agreement on the Bangsamoro”	October 5, 2022	
7	Allowing voluntary wearing of face masks in indoor and outdoor settings, reiterating the continued implementation of minimum public health standards during the state of public health emergency relative to the COVID-19 pandemic	October 28, 2022	
8	Adjusting the dividend rate of the Development Bank of the Philippines pursuant to Section 5 of Republic Act No. 7656	December 9, 2022	
9	Directing the continued suspension of electronic sabong nationwide	December 28, 2022	
10	Extending the temporary modification of rates of import duty on various products under Section 1611 of Republic Act No. 10863, otherwise known as the “Customs Modernization and Tariff Act”	December 29, 2022	
11	Further streamlining the administrative structure of the Office of the President	December 29, 2022	

=== 2023 ===
No.	Title / Description	Date signed	Ref.
12	Temporarily modifying the rates on import duty on electric vehicles, parts, and components under Section 1611 of Republic Act No. 10863, otherwise known as the “Customs Modernization and Tariff Act”	January 13, 2023	
13	Maintaining the temporary modification of rates of import duty on certain agricultural products under Section 1611 of Republic Act No. 10863, otherwise known as the “Customs Modernization and Tariff Act”	January 13, 2023	
14	Approving and adopting the Philippine Development Plan for the period 2023-2028	January 27, 2023	
15	Renaming the Presidential Complaint Center as the Presidential Action Center	February 8, 2023	
16	Reorganizing the Presidential Communications Office	February 13, 2023	
17	Revising the Implementing Rules and Regulations of the Scientific Career System under Executive Order 901 (s. 1983)	February 20, 2023	
18	Constituting Green Lanes for Strategic Investments	February 23, 2023	
19	Directing the establishment of the Philippine Heart Center Annex in the Clark Freeport Zone	March 8, 2023	
20	Establishing the Presidential Help Desk	March 21, 2023	
21	Directing the Establishment of the Policy and Administrative Framework for Offshore Wind Development	April 19, 2023	
22	Creating the Water Resources Management Office in the Department of Environment and Natural Resources	April 27, 2023	
23	Reinforcing and protecting the freedom of association and right to organize of workers, constituting an inter-agency committee to strengthen the coordination and expedite the investigation, prosecution, and resolution of cases for violations thereof, among others	April 30, 2023	
24	Constituting the Disaster Response and Crisis Management Task Force	April 30, 2023	
25	Implementing the Philippine schedule of tariff commitments under the Regional Comprehensive Economic Partnership Agreement, and modifying the rates of import duty on certain imported articles for this purpose	May 7, 2023	
26	Promoting Filipino history and culture through the efficient management of the Malacañang Heritage Mansions, and creating an advisory board and management center for this purpose	May 12, 2023	
27	Reorganizing the Inter-Agency Task Force on Zero Hunger, and amending Executive Order No. 101 (s. 2020) for the purpose	May 18, 2023	
28	Reorganizing and renaming the Economic Development Cluster as the Economic Development Group, and creating the Inter-Agency Committee on Inflation and Market Outlook	May 26, 2023	
29	Strengthening the integration of Public Financial Management Information Systems, streamlining the process thereof, and amending Executive Order No. 55 (S. 2011) for the purpose	June 1, 2023	
30	Strengthening Private Sector participation in the Public-Private Partnership Governing Board established under Executive Order (EO) No. 136 (S. 2013), and further amending EO No. 8 (S. 2010), as amended, for the purpose	June 1, 2023	
31	Institutionalizing the Philippine Open Government Partnership and for other purposes	June 20, 2023	
32	Streamlining the permitting process for the construction of telecommunications and internet infrastructure	July 4, 2023	
33	Adopting the National Anti-Money Laundering, Counter-Terrorism Financing and Counter Proliferation Financing Strategy 2023-2027, reorganizing the National Anti-Money Laundering and Counter-Terrorism Financing Committee, and amending Executive Order No. 68 (s. 2018) for the purpose	July 4, 2023	
34	Declaring the Pambansang Pabahay Para sa Pilipino Program as the flagship program of the Government, and directing all National Government Agencies and Instrumentalities, including Government-Owned or Controlled Corporations, and Local Government Units, to submit a detailed inventory of all available and suitable lands for the implementation of the program	July 17, 2023	
35	Constituting the Inter-Agency Council for the Pasig River Urban Development	July 25, 2023	
36	Reduction and condonation of real property taxes and interests/penalties assessed on power generation facilities of independent power producers under Build-Operate-Transfer contracts with Government-Owned or-Controlled Corporations	July 25, 2023	
37	Approving and adopting the National Security Policy 2023-2028	August 10, 2023	
38	Reorganizing the Strategic Action and Response Office	August 29, 2023	
39	Imposition of mandated price ceilings on rice	August 31, 2023	
40	Extending the moratorium on the payment of the principal obligation and interest of the amortization due and payable by Agrarian Reform Beneficiaries	September 12, 2023	
41	Prohibiting the collection of pass-through fees on national roads and urging Local Government Units to suspend the collection of any form of fees upon all types of vehicles transporting goods under Section 153 or 155 of Republic Act No. 7160 or the "Local Government Code of 1991"	September 25, 2023	
42	Lifting the mandated price ceilings on rice under Executive Order No. 39 (s. 2023)	October 4, 2023	
43	Adjusting the dividend rate of the Land Bank of the Philippines pursuant to Section 5 of Republic Act No. 7656	October 11, 2023	
44	Establishing the "Walang Gutom 2027: Food Stamp Program" as a flagship program of the National Government	October 12, 2023	
45	Transferring the attachment of the Development Academy of the Philippines to the National Economic and Development Authority	October 25, 2023	
46	Temporary modifying the rate of import duty on natural gypsum and anyhydrite under Section 1611 of Republic Act No. 10863, otherwise known as the "Customs Modernization and Tariff Act"	November 3, 2023	
47	Amending Executive Order No. 125, Series of 2021, entitled Creation of the National Amnesty Commission	November 22, 2023	
48	Adjusting the dividend rate of the Development Bank of the Philippines for Calendar Year 2022 pursuant to Section 5 of Republic Act No. 7656	November 28, 2023	
49	Creating the Office of the Special Assistant to the President for Investment and Economic Affairs in the Office of the President, defining its mandates, powers and functions, and for other purposes	December 15, 2023	
50	Maintaining the temporary modification of rates of import duty on various projects under Section 1611 of Republic Act No. 10863, otherwise known as the "Customs Modernization and Tariff Act"	December 22, 2023	
51	Reinforcing the diversity and inclusion program, reconstituting the inter-agency committee on diversity and inclusion, and creating the special committee on lesbian, gay, bisexual, transgender, queer, intersex, and asexual (LGBTQIA+) affairs	December 23, 2023	

=== 2024 ===
No.	Title / Description	Date signed	Ref.
52	Institutionalizing the Pag-abot Program, constituting an Inter-Agency Committee therefor, and for other purposes	January 18, 2024	
53	Reactivating and reconstituting the Task Force El Niño, and for other purposes	January 19, 2024	
54	Reorganizing the National Intelligence Coordinating Agency and for other purposes	January 19, 2024	
55	Adopting the ten-year Maritime Industry Development Plan 2028	February 8, 2024	
56	Regulating the issuance of low-numbered (protocol) license plates to government officials	March 25, 2024	
57	Strengthening the Philippines’ maritime security and maritime domain awareness	March 25, 2024	
58	Adopting the National Cybersecurity Plan 2023-2028, and directing the implementation thereof	April 4, 2024	
59	Streamlining the permitting process for infrastructure flagship projects	April 30, 2024	
60	Reorganizing the Philippine Crop Insurance Corporation and transferring its attachment from the Department of Finance to the Department of Agriculture	May 13, 2024	
61	Suspending the implementation of Administrative Order No. 25 (s. 2011) and Executive Order No. 80 (s. 2012), as amended	June 3, 2024	
62	Modifying the nomenclature and rates of import duty on various products	June 20, 2024	
63	Revoking the policy of granting career executive service rank to graduates of the National Defense College of the Philippines	July 2, 2024	
64	Updating the salary schedule for civilian government personnel and authorizing the grant of an additional allowance, and for other purposes	August 2, 2024	
65	Approving the merger of the LBP Leasing and Finance Corporation (LLFC) and UCPB Leasing and Finance Corporation (ULFC), with the LLFC as the surviving entity	August 6, 2024	
66	Reorganizing the Inter-Agency Task Force on Zero Hunger, further amending Executive Order No. 101 (s. 2020) for the purpose	August 6, 2024	
67	Creating the Presidential Office for Child Protection	August 6, 2024	
68			
69	Reorganizing the National Irrigation Administration and transferring its attachment from the Department of Agriculture to the Office of the President	September 5, 2024	
70	Promoting the development of the Philippine film industry, strengthening the Film Academy of the Philippines for the purpose	October 2, 2024	
71	Transferring the attachment of the National Commission on Indigenous Peoples from the Department of Social Welfare and Development to the Office of the President	October 22, 2024	
72	Adopting an integrated and harmonized process for formulation, approval, budgeting, implementation, and monitoring of master plans for the infrastructure sector	October 28, 2024	
73	Prescribing the new rates and indices of overseas, living quarters, representation, family and education allowances of foreign service personnel	October 30, 2024	
74	Immediate ban of Philippine offshore gaming, internet gaming, and other offshore gaming operations in the Philippines, and for other purposes	November 5, 2024	
75	Strengthening the Center for International Trade Expositions and Missions	November 22, 2024	
76	Declaring the Tara, Basa! tutoring program as a flagship program of the national government	November 22, 2024	
77	Establishing an inter-agency committee on International Humanitarian Law	November 22, 2024	
78	Creating the Office of the Presidential Adviser for Marawi Rehabilitation and Development, defining its mandates, powers and functions, and for other purposes	November 28, 2024	
79	Establishing the Mahalin At Kalingain Ating Mga Bata (MAKABATA) Program, and institutionalizing the MAKABATA helpline 1383	December 6, 2024	
80	Implementing the Philippine schedule of tariff commitments under the Philippines-Korea Free Trade Agreement, and modifying the rates of import duty on certain imported articles	December 23, 2024	
81	Reorganizing the National Security Council	December 30, 2024	

=== 2025 ===
No.	Title / Description	Date signed	Ref.
82	Accelerating socio-economic development in all regions, strengthening Regional Development Councils for this purpose	January 28, 2025	
83	Reducing and condoning real property taxes, including interests and/or penalties, assessed on power generation facilities of independent power producers under build-operate-transfer contracts with government-owned or -controlled corporations	February 13, 2025	
84	Increasing the subsistence allowance of military personnel of the Armed Forces of the Philippines	March 14, 2025	
85	Reorganizing the Board of Directors of the Philippine Guarantee Corporation	March 27, 2025	
86	Authorizing the issuance of digital nomad visa	April 24, 2025	
87	Updating the list of designated statistical activities that will generate critical data for decision-making of the government and private sectors	May 21, 2025	
88	Strengthening the National Task Force Diwalwal	July 4, 2025	
89	Abolishing the Office of the Presidential Adviser on Military and Police Affairs	July 11, 2025	
90	Transferring the attachment of, and reorganizing the Presidential Legislative Liaison Office	July 16, 2025	
91	Further ensuring the continuity of governmental operations and uninterrupted delivery of critical public services in the Province of Sulu, declaring the Province of Sulu as part of Region IX (Zamboanga Peninsula), and for other purposes	July 30, 2025	
92	Creating the Office of the Presidential Adviser on Pasig River rehabilitation and reogranizing the inter-agency council for the Pasig River urban development	August 13, 2025	
93	Suspending the importation of regular milled and well-milled rice for 60 days	August 29, 2025	
94	Creating the Independent Commission for Infrastructure	September 11, 2025	
95	Approving the compensation and position classification system II and pay grades for government-owned or -controlled corporations, repealing Executive Order No. 150 (s. 2021), and for other purposes	September 16, 2025	
96	Transferring the attachment of the National Commission of Senior Citizens to the Department of Social Welfare and Development, and for other purposes	September 18, 2025	
97	Adopting the omnibus guidelines on the exercise of freedom of association and civil liberties	September 19, 2025	
