= Prayer protest =

Prayer has a long history as a means of protesting injustices, appealing both to God to intervene and enact justice in the situation, and to political opponents to rise to a superior moral position.

Boston declared a day of fasting and prayer in September 1768 as a protest against a British plan to station troops in the city. The Colony of Virginia's House of Burgesses established a day of fasting and prayer to take place on Wednesday, June 1, 1774, to protest the Boston Port Act.

A. Philip Randolph pioneered the use of prayer protests as a tactic of the civil rights movement. A "pray-in" is now a recognized tactic of nonviolent protest combining the practices of prayer and a sit-in.

Christian leaders have publicly prayed for corporate executives in an effort to change their decisions regarding employee pay. The Middle East conflict has engaged many people to participate in prayer sit-ins to protest closures of mosques, political reform, and military actions.
