= Meeting =

Event in which two or more people assemble, planned in advance to facilitate discussion

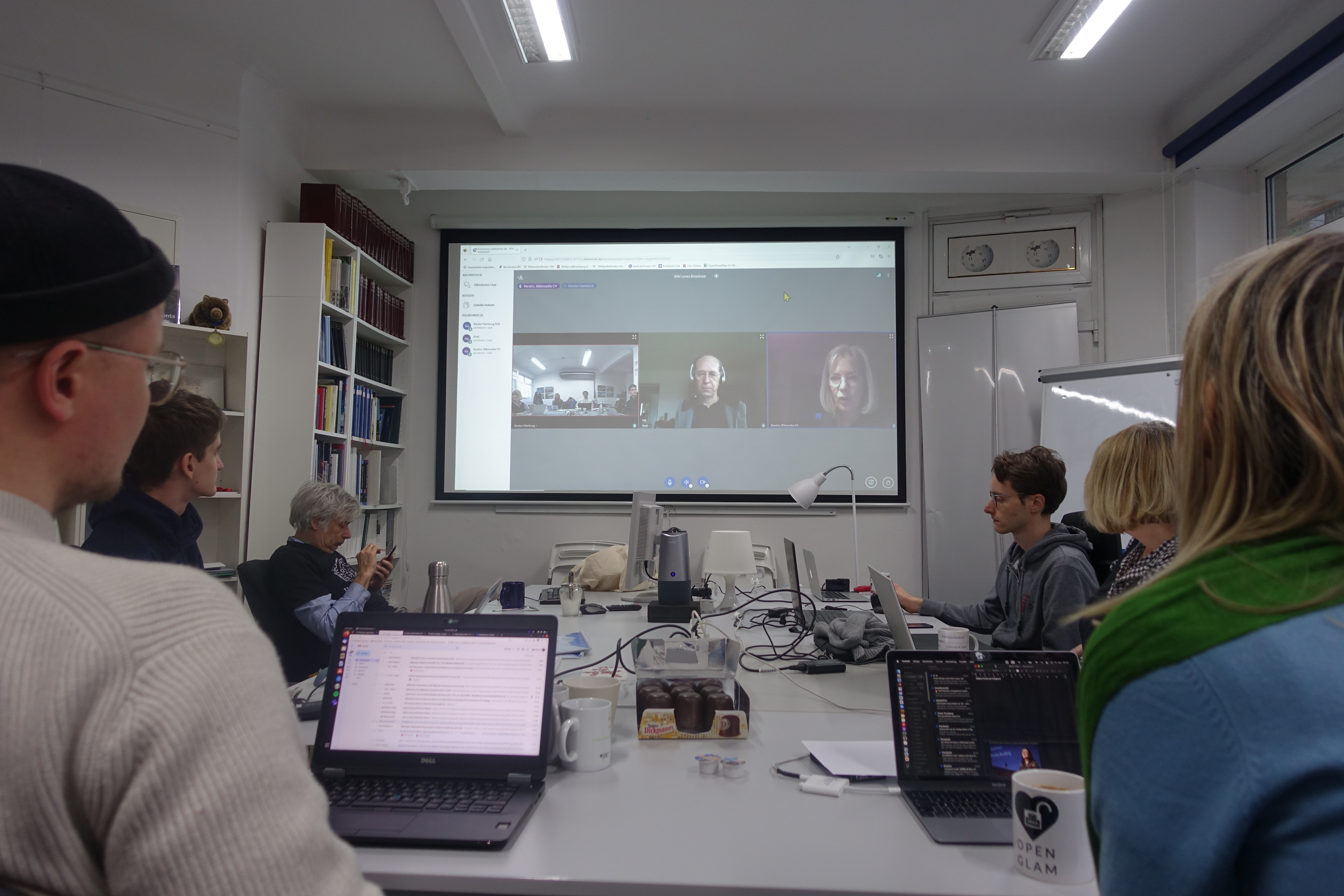
Hybrid meeting: People meet in person and connect digitally with others

A meeting is when two or more people come together to discuss one or more topics, often in a formal or business setting, but meetings also occur in a variety of other environments. Meetings can be used as form of group decision-making and as a setting for sharing of information or intelligence.

== Definition ==
A meeting refers to a gathering with a specific agenda and not just mere gathering of people casually talking to each other. Meetings may occur face-to-face or virtually, as mediated by communications technology, such as a telephone conference call, a skyped conference call or a videoconference. Merriam-Webster dictionary defines a meeting as "an act or process of coming together" - for example "as [...] an assembly for a common purpose [...]".

Meeting planners and other meeting professionals may use the term "meeting" to denote an event booked at a hotel, convention center or any other venue dedicated to such gatherings.

Anthropologist Helen B. Schwartzman defines a meeting as "a communicative event involving three or more people who agree to assemble for a purpose ostensibly related to the functioning of an organization or group." For her, meetings are characterized by "multiparty talk that is episodic in nature, and participants either develop or use specific conventions for regulating this talk."

== Types ==
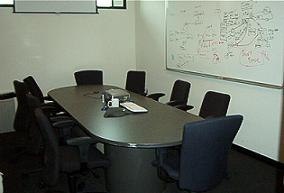
Meetings sometimes take place in conference rooms.

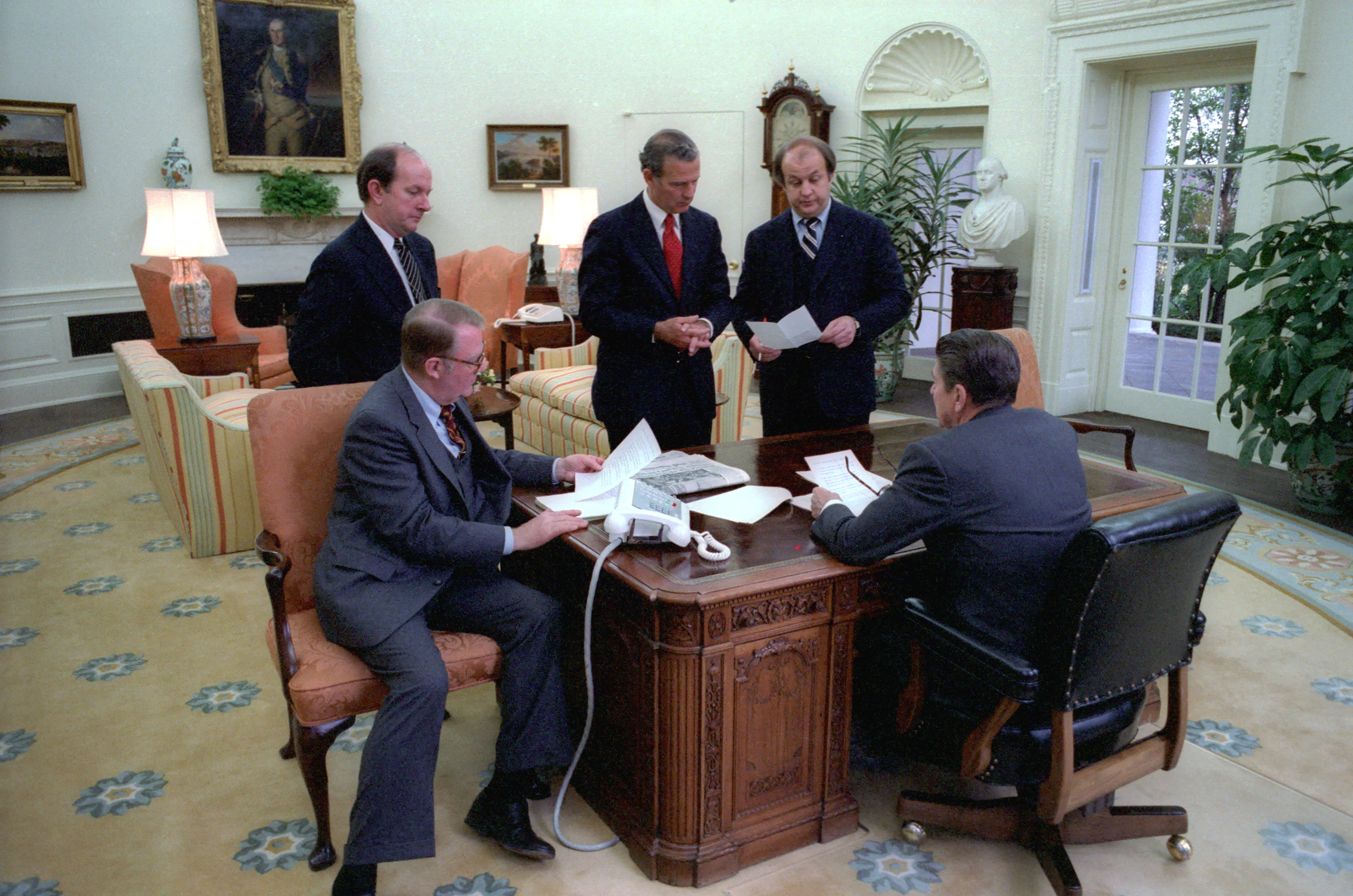
First staff meeting of new U.S. President Ronald Reagan

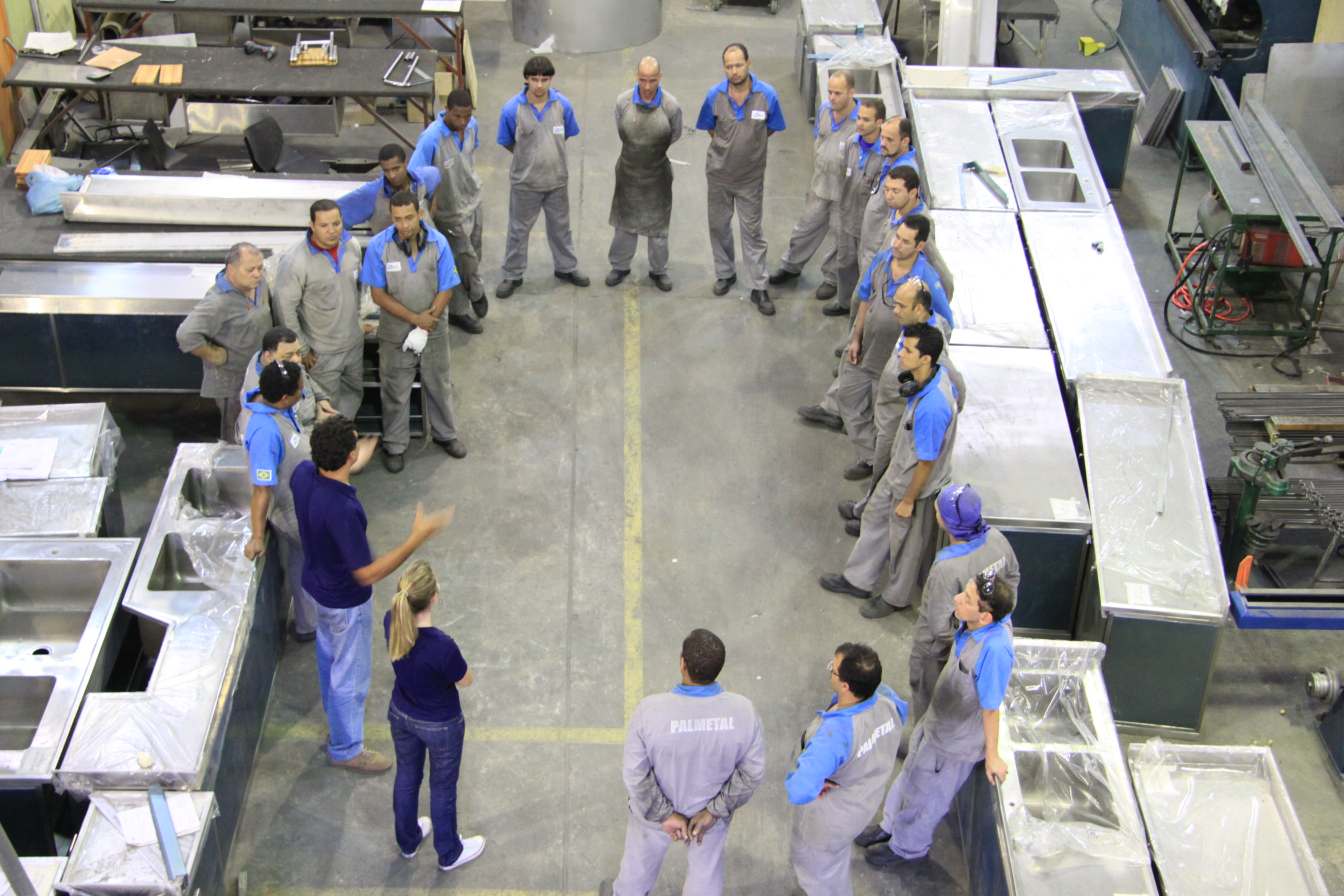
Training meeting about sustainable design. The photo shows a training meeting with factory workers in a stainless-steel ecodesign company in Rio de Janeiro, Brazil.

The term "meeting" may refer to a lecture (one presentation), seminar (typically several presentations, small audience, one day), conference (mid-size, one or more days), congress (large, several days), exhibition or trade show (with staffed stands being visited by passers-by), workshop (smaller, with active participants), training course, team-building session and kick-off event.

Common types of meeting include:

- Committee meeting, a coming-together of a defined subset of an organization
- Investigative meeting, generally when conducting a pre-interview, exit interview or a meeting among the investigator and representative
- Kickoff meeting, the first meeting with a project team and the client of the project to discuss the role of each team-member
- Town hall meeting, an informal public gathering.
- Work meeting, which produces a product or intangible result such as a decision; compare working group.

- Board meeting, a meeting of the board of directors of an organization
- Management meeting, a meeting among managers
- Staff meeting, typically a meeting between a manager and those that report to that manager
- Team meeting, in project contexts - a meeting among colleagues working on various aspects of a team project.

Other varieties include breakfast meetings off-site meetings (or Awayday meetings in the UK), and "stand-up meetings" where participants stand up to encourage brevity.

Since a meeting can be held once or often, the meeting organizer has to determine the repetition and frequency of occurrence of the meeting: one-time, recurring meeting, or a series meeting such as a monthly "lunch and learn" event at a company, church, club or organization in which the placeholder is the same, but the agenda and topics to be covered vary. In Russian, a "flying meeting" (Russian: летучий митинг, romanized: letuchij miting) is a hastily called brief meeting.

== Conversational analysis ==
Meetings have been studied using conversation analysis. Meetings are thought of as a distinct speech exchange system with different norms and rules. Participants may move in and out of the conversation exchange system during the meeting. A meeting will often have a chair who has some control over the discussion in the meeting. The chair may have a superior position in a social hierarchy or be appointed as a facilitator.

The beginning of the meeting speech exchange system is often indicated by nonverbal cues, or stating the purpose of the meeting. In formal meetings, the chair has control over turn-taking in a conversation. In informal meetings the participants often decide for themselves who turn taking functions with the chair occasionally intervening. Non-verbal communication with the chair may be used to take a turn.

Often the chair will control the choice of topic of discussion, different chairs will control the conversation in different ways. A pre-closing formulation is an individual's summarization of the groups understanding of a topic. Silence is often used to indicate agreement to this final formalization. Turns within a topic are expected to be related to previous turns of the topic as a whole. In settings turns are long and more loosely related to the previous turns. In these cases, the speaker may introduce the subject matter of the turn and related it to the agenda topic.

== See also ==
- Action item
- Agenda
  - Online diary planner
- BarCamp
- Conference room
- Event management
- Facilitation (business)
- International Congress Calendar
- Meeting point
- Meeting scheduling tool
- Minutes
- Official trip
- Organizational development
- Parliamentary procedure
- Quaker meeting for worship
- Robert's Rules of Order
- Scientific meeting
- Town meeting
- Task list
- Unconference
