= Action item =

Management term for an action that needs to take place

In management, an action item is a documented event, task, activity, or action that needs to take place. Action items are discrete units that can be handled by a single person.

== Planning actions ==
Action items are usually created during a discussion by a group of people who are meeting about one or more topics, and during the discussion, it is discovered that some kind of action is needed. The act required is then documented as an action item and is typically assigned to someone, usually a member of the group. The person to whom the action is assigned is then obligated to perform the action and report back to the group on the results.

Action items are usually documented in the meeting minutes and are recorded in the task list of the group. As people complete action items, the items are documented as being completed and the item is removed from the list of outstanding action items.

== Attributes ==
There are many attributes that can be associated with an action item — examples being:

- Identifier - Unique mark to reference an event or item.
- Description - Short explanation of activity to be performed
- Work stream - Business requirements, technical design, user interface, commit checklist, commit gate materials, etc. (optional)
- Issue or Risk - Associated with a project, issue, or risk
- Status - Open, In Progress, Resolved, Canceled
- Urgency/Priority - What is the impact to your project's critical path?
- Comments - Description of what is now being done to solve the issue
- Owner - Who is responsible for actively working the issue?
- Created Date - Date issue was opened
- Planned completion date - When will this issue be solved?
- Actual completion date - Date issue was closed

== Tracking ==
A usual format for an action item is to record an action item number, the date when the action item is identified or created, the name of the person to whom the action is assigned, a title description of the action, a more detailed description of the action and its outcomes, and its deliverables.

An action item can be considered a more general form of various types of action/issue/defect tracking methods. For instance, a bug report is a form of an action item, as is a service report created by a service company to track a problem reported by a customer or an RMA number.

Follow up in a consistent and timely manner with the responsible individual(s) to track their progress and drive the action item to resolution.

It is important to understand the distinction here that we track to resolution and not to completion. While it is the goal to have every action item completed, there are numerous scenarios in which the action item may no longer be relevant or completion may not be possible.

== Software ==
There are a number of software applications for tracking action items or service reports. These applications are used within software development organizations as well as in customer support functions. Because these software applications facilitate group communication, they are often referred to as Collaborative software or groupware. Various such software are available in the market. They are known to increase the productivity of Managers.

Many information technology support groups use some kind of service report software so that when a trouble report is called in, the person answering the telephone will create a trouble ticket to track the issue. The trouble ticket is assigned to a member of the IT services organization, who then visits the person who has reported a problem and resolves the problem. The IT services person will then close out the trouble ticket, indicating the issue has been resolved.

Recent research at the Computational Semantics Lab at Stanford University seeks to automatically identify action items and extract their properties (the what, who, and when of the action item) using automatic speech recognition transcripts from spontaneous, multi-party conversations during meetings.

== Parody ==
The concept was parodied in 2000 by Neil McAllister in a widely circulated "superhero" comic strip.

== See also ==
- Task list
- Bug report
- IT Service Management
