= Pambansang Pabahay Para sa Pilipino =

National housing program of the Philippines

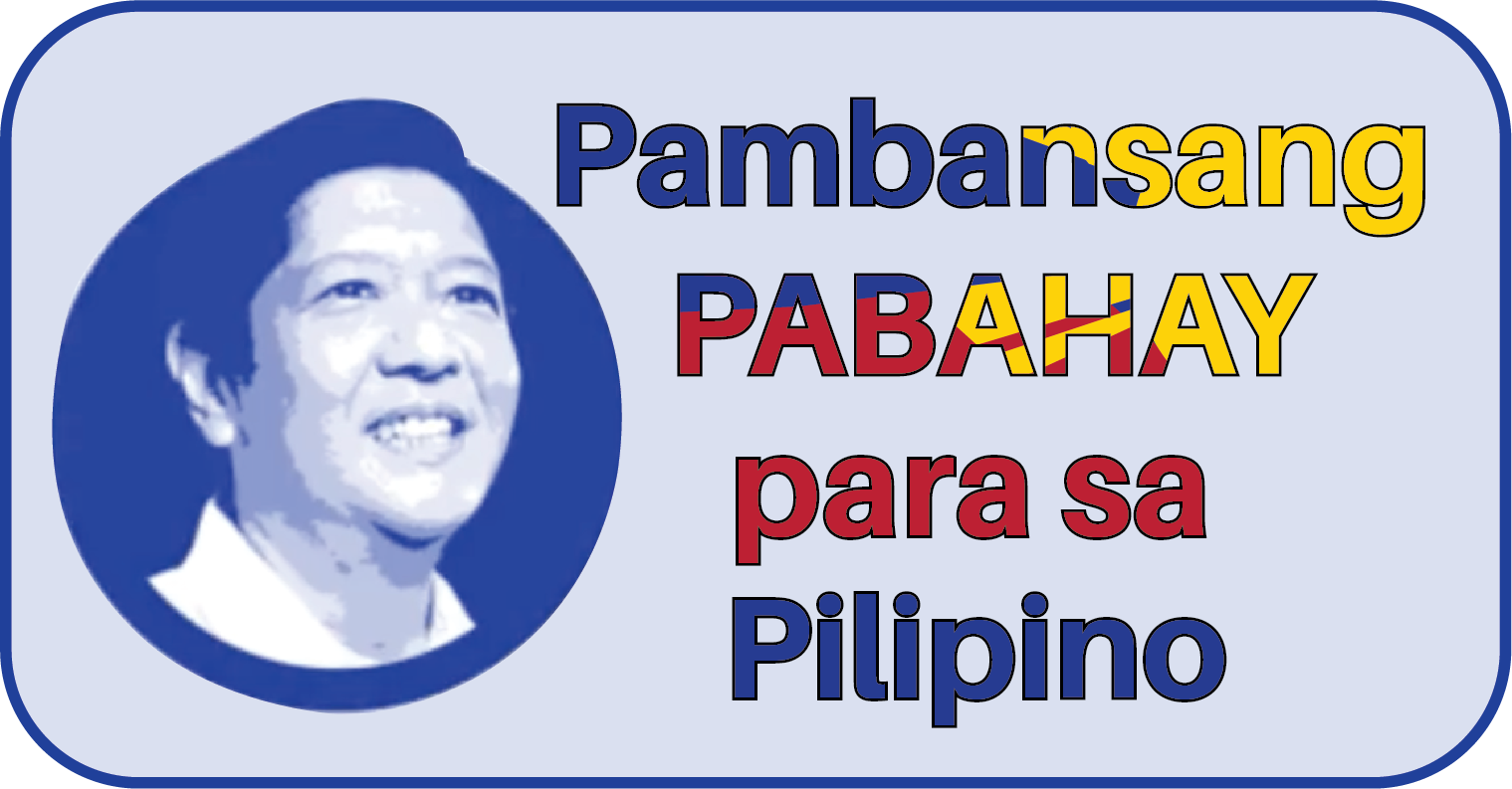
Official logo of the Pambansang Pabahay Para sa Pilipino (4PH) Program

The Pambansang Pabahay Para sa Pilipino Program (lit. 'National Housing for the Filipino Program'), also known as the 4PH Program, is the national housing program of the Philippine government. It was launched in September 2022 with the goal of having zero informal settlers by 2028.

The Marcos administration aims to build 1 million housing units annually which is intended to address the backlog of 6.5 million housing units of the country. As of April 19, 2023, about 1.2–1.3 million housing sites have been started since Marcos assumed office.

== Development ==
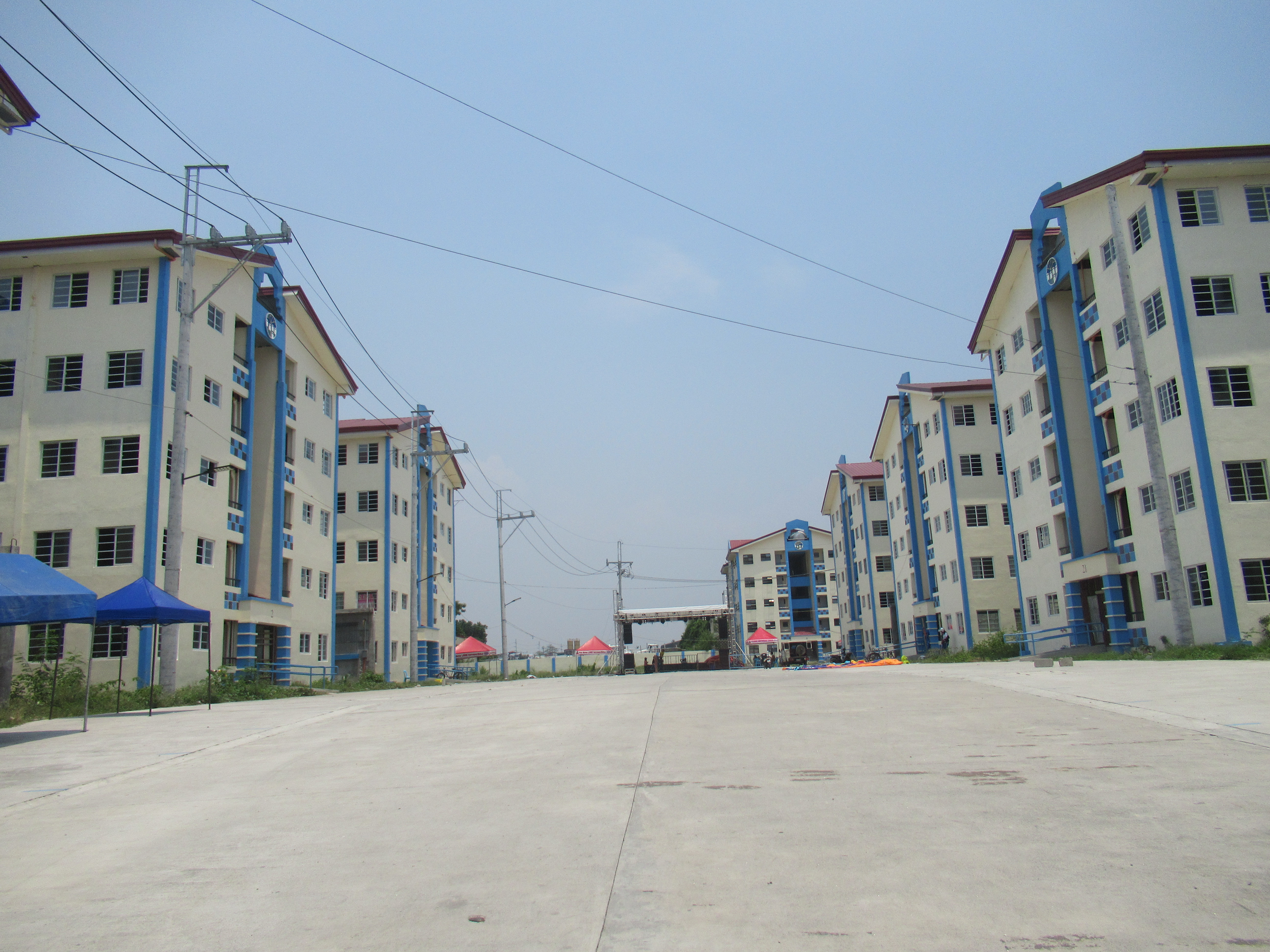
St. Gregory Housing (Panghulo, Malabon)

On July 17, 2023, President Bongbong Marcos issued Executive Order No. 34, which directs all National Government Agencies and Instrumentalities, including Government-Owned or Controlled Corporations (GOCCs), as well as Local Government Units (LGUs) to submit a detailed inventory of suitable lands for housing for the implementation of the program. The government announced that it will provide a 5% annual interest to the beneficiaries of the low-cost housing program for 10 years. In December 2023, Pag-IBIG approved ₱12 billion credit line for the National Housing Authority, which will finance the development of 9,110 housing units nationwide (4,111 units in Quezon City, 1,377 in Valenzuela, 944 in Zamboanga City, and 535 in San Juan).

The 4PH Program is envisioned to create smart cities nationwide.

In 2024, the Department of Human Settlements and Urban Development in its 5th anniversary announced building 1 million housing units yearly until 2028 based on Marcos Jr.'s 4PH Program. Its target of 6 million homes is anchored on sustainable housing development with cutting-edge technology or innovation.
