= Kickoff meeting =

First meeting with a project team

A kickoff meeting is the first meeting with the project team and with or without the client of the project. This meeting would follow definition of the base elements for the project and other project planning activities. This meeting introduces the members of the project team and the client and provides the opportunity to discuss the role of team members. Other base elements in the project that involve the client may also be discussed at this meeting (schedule, status reporting, etc.).

If there are any new team members, the process to be followed is explained so as to maintain quality standards of the organization. Clarity is given by the project lead if there exists any ambiguity in the process implementations.

There is a special discussion on the legalities involved in the project. For example, the design team interacting with the testing team may want a car to be tested on city roads. If the legal permissions are not mentioned by the concerned stakeholder during kickoff, the test may get modified later to comply with local traffic laws (this causes unplanned delay in project implementation). So, it would be best to have a discussion about this during the kickoff meeting and to follow it up separately, rather than to proceed on assumptions and later be forced to replan test procedures.

The kickoff meeting is an enthusiasm-generator for the customer and displays a full summary of the project so far. By displaying a thorough knowledge of the goal and steps on how to reach it, the customer gains confidence in the team's ability to deliver the work. Kickoff means that the work starts.

== See also ==
- Project management
