= Tulfo =

Tulfo (Tagalog: [ˈtulfo]) is a Filipino surname. Notable people with the surname include:

- Ben Tulfo (born 1955), Filipino TV and radio personality
- Erwin Tulfo (born 1964), Filipino news anchor and radio commentator
- Jocelyn Tulfo (born 1960), Filipino politician, wife of Raffy
- Raffy Tulfo (born 1960), Filipino broadcast journalist and politician
- Ramon Tulfo (born 1946), Filipino TV host, radio broadcaster and columnist
- Wanda Teo (née Tulfo) (born 1952), Filipino travel agent

== See also ==
- Tutok Tulfo, Philippine investigative news show
