= PMPC Star Award for Best Public Service Program =

The PMPC Star Award for Best Public Service Program is given to the best television public service of the year and also public service program hosts.

== Winners ==
=== Public Service Programs ===
- 1987: Kapwa Ko Mahal Ko (GMA 7)
- 1988:
- 1989: Damayan (PTV 4)
- 1990:
- 1991: Hotline sa Trese (IBC 13)
- 1992: Eye to Eye (GMA 7)
- 1993: Hoy Gising! (ABS-CBN 2)
- 1994:
- 1995:
- 1996:
- 1997:
- 1998: not given
- 1999: Hoy Gising! (ABS-CBN 2)
- 2000: Hoy Gising! (ABS-CBN 2)
- 2001: Imbestigador (GMA 7)
- 2002: Mission X (ABS-CBN 2)
- 2003: Wish Ko Lang (GMA 7)
- 2004: Imbestigador (GMA 7)
- 2005: Bitag (IBC 13)
- 2006: Wish Ko Lang (GMA 7)
- 2007: Bitag (UNTV 37)
- 2008: Bitag (UNTV 37)
- 2009: Imbestigador (GMA 7)
- 2010: Bitag (UNTV 37)
- 2011: Bitag (UNTV 37)
- 2012: Wish Ko Lang (GMA 7)
- 2013: Imbestigador (GMA 7)
- 2014: T3: Enforced (TV5)
- 2015: T3: Enforced (TV5)
- 2016: Buhay OFW (Aksyon TV) & Mission Possible (ABS-CBN 2)
- 2017: Wish Ko Lang (GMA 7)
- 2018: Healing Galing (TV5)
- 2019: Healing Galing (TV5)
- 2020: Healing Galing (TV5)
- 2021: Wish Ko Lang (UNTV 37)
- 2023: Wish Ko Lang (GMA 7)
- 2024: Wish Ko Lang (GMA 7)

=== Public Service Program Hosts ===
- 1987: Cielito del Mundo and Orly Mercado (Kapwa Ko Mahal Ko / GMA 7)
- 1988:
- 1989: Rosa Rosal (Damayan / PTV 4)
- 1990: Joseph Estrada and Cory Quirino (Hotline sa Trese / IBC 13)
- 1991: Joseph Estrada and Cory Quirino (Hotline sa Trese / IBC 13)
- 1992:
- 1993: Inday Badiday (Eye to Eye / GMA 7)
- 1994: Inday Badiday (Eye to Eye / GMA 7)
- 1995:
- 1996:
- 1997:
- 1998: not given
- 1999: Ted Failon (Hoy Gising / ABS-CBN 2)
- 2000: Ted Failon (Hoy Gising / ABS-CBN 2)
- 2001: Mike Enriquez (Imbestigador / GMA 7)
- 2002: Erwin Tulfo (Mission X / ABS-CBN 2)
- 2003: Willie Revillame (Willingly Yours / ABS-CBN 2)
- 2004: Vicky Morales (Wish Ko Lang / GMA 7)
- 2005: Ben Tulfo (Bitag / IBC 13)
- 2006: Mike Enriquez (Imbestigador / GMA 7)
- 2007: Vicky Morales (Wish Ko Lang / GMA 7)
- 2008: Ben Tulfo (Bitag / UNTV 37)
- 2009: Ben Tulfo (Bitag Live / UNTV 37)
- 2010: Vicky Morales (Wish Ko Lang / GMA 7)
- 2011: Presida Acosta (Public Atorni / TV5)
- 2012: Presida Acosta (Public Atorni / TV5)
- 2013: Vicky Morales (Wish Ko Lang / GMA 7)
- 2014: Vicky Morales (Wish Ko Lang / GMA 7)
- 2015: Vicky Morales (Wish Ko Lang / GMA 7)
- 2016: Julius Babao (Mission: Possible / ABS-CBN 2)
- 2017: Vicky Morales (Wish Ko Lang / GMA 7)
- 2018: Vicky Morales (Wish Ko Lang / GMA 7)
- 2019: Edinell Calvario (Healing Galing / TV5)
- 2020: Edinell Calvario (Healing Galing / TV5)
- 2021: Edinell Calvario (Healing Galing / UNTV 37)
- 2023: Edinell Calvario (Healing Galing / GMA 7)
- 2024: Edinell Calvario (Healing Galing / GMA 7)
