= Bibliography of the Philippines =

The National Flag of the Philippines

This is a bibliography of works on the Philippines.

== Overviews ==
- Abinales, Patricio N. (July 8, 2022). Modern Philippines. ABC-CLIO. ISBN 978-1-4408-6005-8.
- Boquet, Yves (April 19, 2017). The Philippine Archipelago. Springer. ISBN 9783319519265.
- Crow, Carl (1914). America and the Philippines. Doubleday, Page.
- Dolan, Ronald E., ed. (1991). "Philippines". Country Studies. Washington: GPO for the Library of Congress. Archived from the original on November 9, 2005.
- Friis, Herman Ralph, ed. (1967). The Pacific Basin: A History of Its Geographical Exploration. American Geographical Society.
- Go, Julian; Foster, Anne L. (2003). The American Colonial State in the Philippines: Global Perspectives. Duke University Press. ISBN 978-0-8223-3099-8.
- Hicks, Nigel (2005). This is the Philippines. New Holland Publishers. ISBN 978-1-84537-246-0.
- Rice, Mark (2014). Dean Worcester's Fantasy Islands: Photography, Film, and the Colonial Philippines. University of Michigan Press. ISBN 978-0-472-05218-9.
- Ring, Trudy; Salkin, Robert M.; La Boda, Sharon (1994). International Dictionary of Historic Places: Asia and Oceania. Taylor & Francis. ISBN 978-1-884964-04-6.
- Rood, Steven (June 15, 2019). The Philippines: What Everyone Needs to Know®. Oxford University Press. ISBN 978-0-19-092060-9.
- Rowthorn, Chris; Bloom, Greg (2006). Philippines (9th ed.). Lonely Planet. ISBN 978-1-74104-289-4.
- Thompson, Mark R.; Batalla, Eric Vincent C. (February 19, 2018). Routledge Handbook of the Contemporary Philippines. Routledge. ISBN 978-1-317-48526-1.
- Tople, Lily Rose R.; Nonan-Mercado, Detch P. (2002). Philippines. Marshall Cavendish. ISBN 978-0-7614-1475-9.
- Woods, Damon L. (2006). The Philippines: A Global Studies Handbook. ABC-CLIO. ISBN 978-1-85109-675-6.
- Worcester, Dean C. (1898). The Philippine Islands and their People. Macmillan & Co.
- Zanini, Gianni (1999). Philippines: From Crisis to Opportunity: Country Assistance Review. World Bank Publications. ISBN 978-0-8213-4294-7.
- The Report: Philippines 2009. Oxford Business Group. 2009. ISBN 978-1-902339-12-2.
- The Far East and Australasia 2003. Psychology Press. 2002. ISBN 978-1-85743-133-9.

== History ==
- Abinales, P. N.; Amoroso, Donna J. (2005). State and Society in the Philippines. Rowman & Littlefield. ISBN 978-0-7425-1024-1.
- Agoncillo, Teodoro A. (1990). History of the Filipino People (8th ed.). Garotech Publishing. ISBN 978-971-8711-06-4.
- Alip, Eufronio Melo (1964). Political and cultural history of the Philippines, Volumes 1–2.
- Barrows, David (2014). A History of the Philippines-Illustrated. ISBN 978-0-34-292-6466.
- Church, Peter (13 March 2017). A Short History of South-East Asia. John Wiley & Sons. ISBN 978-1-119-06248-6.
- De Borja, Marciano R. (2005). Basques In The Philippines. University of Nevada Press. ISBN 9780874175905. Archived from the original on March 26, 2022.
- Duka, Cecilio D. (2008). Struggle for Freedom. Rex Bookstore, Inc. ISBN 9789712350450.
- Feuer, A. B. (2002). America at War: The Philippines, 1898–1913. Greenwood Publishing Group. ISBN 978-0-275-96821-2.
- Guillermo, Artemio R. (2012). Historical Dictionary of the Philippines. The Scarecrow Press. ISBN 9780810872462.
- Halili, Maria Christine N. (2004). Philippine History. Rex Bookstore. ISBN 978-971-23-3934-9.
- Junker, Laura Lee (1999). Raiding, Trading, and Feasting: The Political Economy of Philippine Chiefdoms. Honolulu, HI: University of Hawaii Press. ISBN 978-0-8248-2035-0.
- Kurlansky, Mark (30 September 2011). The Basque History Of The World. Random House. ISBN 978-1-4481-1322-4.
- Lea, David; Milward, Colette (2001). A Political Chronology of South-East Asia and Oceania. Psychology Press. ISBN 978-1-85743-117-9.
- McAmis, Robert Day (2002). Malay Muslims: The History and Challenge of Resurgent Islam in Southeast Asia. Wm. B. Eerdmans Publishing. ISBN 978-0-8028-4945-8.
- Mehl, Eva Maria (2016). Forced Migration in the Spanish Pacific World From Mexico to the Philippines, 1765–1811. Cambridge University Press. doi:10.1017/CBO9781316480120. ISBN 9781316480120.
- Morton, Louis (1953). The Fall of the Philippines. US Army Center of Military History. Archived from the original on December 24, 2007.
- Munoz, Paul Michel (2006). Early Kingdoms of the Indonesian Archipelago and the Malay Peninsula. Singapore: Editions Didier Millet. ISBN 978-981-4155-67-0.
- Newson, Linda A. (April 16, 2009). Conquest and Pestilence in the Early Spanish Philippines. University of Hawaii Press. ISBN 978-0-8248-6197-1.
- Ooi, Keat Gin (2004). Southeast Asia: A Historical Encyclopedia, from Angkor Wat to East Timor. ABC-CLIO. ISBN 978-1-57607-770-2.
- Osborne, Milton E. (2013). Southeast Asia: An Introductory History (10th ed.). Allen & Unwin. ISBN 978-1-74176-959-3.
- Rottman, Gordon L. (2002). World War 2 Pacific Island Guide – A Geo-Military Study. Westport, CT: Greenwood Press. ISBN 978-0-313-31395-0.
- Scott, William Henry (1994). Barangay: Sixteenth-century Philippine Culture and Society. Quezon City: Ateneo de Manila University Press. ISBN 978-971-550-135-4.
- Scott, William Henry (1984). Prehispanic Source Materials for the Study of Philippine History. Quezon City: New Day Publishers. ISBN 978-971-10-0227-5.
- Spate, Oskar H.K. (1979). "Magellan's Successors: Loaysa to Urdaneta. Two failures: Grijalva and Villalobos". The Spanish Lake – The Pacific since Magellan. Vol. I. Taylor & Francis. ISBN 978-0-7099-0049-8.
- Steinberg, David Joel; Chandler, David P.; Roff, William R.; Smail, John R. W.; Taylor, Robert H.; Woodside, Alexander; Wyatt, David K. (1 January 1988). In Search of Southeast Asia: A Modern History (Revised ed.). University of Hawaii Press. ISBN 978-0-8248-1110-5.
- Tarling, Nicholas (1999). "Part Two – From c. 1500 to c. 1800". The Cambridge History of Southeast Asia. Vol. 1. Cambridge, RU: Cambridge University Press. ISBN 978-0-521-66370-0.
- Tarling, Nicholas (2000). "From World War II to the Present". The Cambridge History of Southeast Asia. Vol. 4. Cambridge University Press. ISBN 978-0-521-66372-4.
- Halstead, Murat (1898). The Story of the Philippines.

== Geography ==
- Carating, Rodelio B.; Galanta, Raymundo G.; Bacatio, Clarita D. (April 23, 2014). The Soils of the Philippines. Springer Science+Business Media. ISBN 978-94-017-8682-9.

== Culture ==
- Aquino, Richard S.; Porter, Brooke A. (2022). Tourism in the Philippines: Applied Management Perspectives. Springer Nature. ISBN 978-981-19-4497-0.
- Fox, Robert B. (1970). The Tabon Caves: Archaeological Explorations and Excavations on Palawan. National Museum. ASIN B001O7GGNI.
- Dumont, Jean-Paul (June 1992). Visayan Vignettes: Ethnographic Traces of a Philippine Island. University of Chicago Press. ISBN 978-0-226-16955-2.
- Herbert, Patricia; Milner, Anthony Crothers (1 January 1989). South-East Asia: Languages and Literatures : a Select Guide. University of Hawaii Press. ISBN 978-0-8248-1267-6.
- Murray, Jeremy A.; Nadeau, Kathleen (August 15, 2016). Pop Culture in Asia and Oceania. ABC-CLIO. ISBN 978-1-4408-3991-7.
- Nadal, Kevin L. (March 23, 2011). Filipino American Psychology: A Handbook of Theory, Research, and Clinical Practice. John Wiley & Sons. ISBN 978-1-118-01977-1.
- Rodell, Paul A. (2002). Culture and Customs of the Philippines. Greenwood Publishing Group. ISBN 978-0-313-30415-6.
- Solheim, Wilhelm G.; Bulbeck, F. David; Flavel, Ambika (2006). Archaeology and Culture in Southeast Asia: Unraveling the Nusantao. UP Press. ISBN 978-971-542-508-7.
- Thompson, Roger M. (October 16, 2003). Filipino English and Taglish: Language switching from multiple perspectives. John Benjamins Publishing Company. ISBN 978-90-272-9607-8.
- Tofighian, Nadi (2006). "The role of Jose Nepomuceno in the Philippine society: What language did his silent films speak?". DiVA portal. Stockholm University. Archived from the original on March 9, 2012.
- Villaruz, Basilio Esteban S. (2006). Treading Through: 45 Years of Philippine Dance. University of the Philippines Press. ISBN 9789715425094.
- Wernstedt, Frederick L.; Spencer, Joseph Earle (January 1967). The Philippine Island World: A Physical, Cultural, and Regional Geography. University of California Press. ISBN 9780520035133.
- Zialcita, Fernando Nakpil (2005). Authentic Though not Exotic: Essays on Filipino Identity. Quezon City: Ateneo University Press. ISBN 978-971-550-479-9.
- Zibart, Eve (2001). The Ethnic Food Lover's Companion: Understanding the Cuisines of the World. Menasha Ridge Press. ISBN 978-0-89732-372-7.

== Economy ==
- Ure, John (2008). Telecommunications Development in Asia. Hong Kong University Press. ISBN 978-962-209-903-6.
- The Impact of Trade on Employment in the Philippines: Country Report (PDF). Makati City, Philippines: International Labour Organization. April 2019. ISBN 978-92-2-133021-9. Archived from the original (PDF) on January 24, 2022.

== Politics ==
- Bühler, Konrad G. (February 8, 2001). State Succession and Membership in International Organizations: Legal Theories Versus Political Pragmatism. Martinus Nijhoff Publishers. ISBN 9789041115539.
- Lazo, Ricardo S. (2009). Philippine Governance and the 1987 Constitution (2006 ed.). Rex Bookstore, Inc. ISBN 9789712345463.
- Russell, C. E., E. B. Rodriguez, José Rizal (1923), The hero of the Filipinos: The story of José Rizal, poet, patriot and martyr
- Timberman, David G. (1991). A Changeless Land: Continuity and Change in Philippine Politics. ISEAS - Yusof Ishak Institute. ISBN 978-981-3035-86-7.

== Demographics ==
- Department of Health (2018). "National Objectives for Health Philippines, 2017–2022" (PDF). National Objectives for Health. Manila, Philippines: Health Policy Development and Planning Bureau. ISSN 1908-6768. Archived from the original (PDF) on September 13, 2020.
- "Philippines in Figures 2014" (PDF). Philippine Statistics Authority. Archived from the original (PDF) on April 20, 2015.

== See also ==
- Outline of the Philippines
