= Kilos Pronto =

- Created by: Bitag Media Unlimited Inc.
- Developed by: Bitag Media Unlimited Inc.
- Starring: Ben Tulfo
- Narrated by: Alex Santos
- Opening theme: "KP music theme" composed by Mike Kosa
- Country of origin: Philippines

Production
- Executive producer: Ben Tulfo
- Camera setup: Multi-camera setup
- Running time: 60 minutes

Original release
- Network: UNTV (2016–17); PTV (2017–18)
- Release: October 10, 2016 – April 27, 2018

Related
- T3: Alliance (TV5)

Kilos Pronto (Front Act) is a Philippine television public service show broadcast by UNTV and PTV. Originally hosted by Ben Tulfo, Alex Santos and Nikka Cleofe-Alejar. It aired from October 10, 2016 to April 27, 2018. Tulfo served as the final host. Ben coined the program as an "Hybrid Public Service Program on Television".

== Hosts ==
=== Current ===
- Ben Tulfo (2016–18)

=== Former ===
- Veronica Alejar (a.k.a. Nikka Cleofe-Alejar) (deceased) (2016)
- Alex Santos (2016–18)
- Erwin Tulfo (2017–18)

== Segments ==
- Sumbong OFW (formerly KP OFW)- focuses on help on distressed workers in the Middle East mostly in Saudi Arabia and Kuwait.
- Akto - caught in the act via CCTV or dashcams.
- Hiwaga - a spin-off of BMUI produced show Kakaibang Lunas sponsored by King's Herbal drink.
- Sala sa Balita (commentary)
- KP Metro
- KP Promdi
- Travel Pass
- Hoy Kengkoy
- ITravel Pinas

== Controversy ==
The Commission on Audit (COA), in its audit findings, noted that there is a memorandum of agreement on file between the tourism department and the government-owned station requiring PTNI to air a 6-minute tourism advertisement section in PTVs Kilos Pronto, plus a 3-minute DOT spot within the program. This has been criticized, since at the time of the memorandum the Department of Tourism Secretary was Wanda Tulfo Teo sister of the hosts of the show.

== See also ==
- Bitag
- List of programs broadcast by UNTV
- List of programs broadcast by People's Television Network
