= Campus Challenge =

- Genre: Game show
- Created by: Daniel Razon; Pat Fuentes-Perez
- Written by: Ramon Lorenzo
- Directed by: Pat Fuentes-Perez
- Presented by: Zahra Bianca Saldua; Jonathan "Sib" Sibulo
- Theme music composer: Rynel Gutierrez
- Opening theme: "Campus Challenge" by Rynel Gutierrez and KNC Show Kids
- Country of origin: Philippines
- Original languages: Tagalog and English
- No. of seasons: 4
- No. of episodes: 56

Production
- Executive producers: Nina Domingo; Gerardo Panghulan; Lyn Tamayo
- Production locations: PETA Theater Center, Quezon City, Philippines (Seasons 1–2); La Verdad Christian College, Caloocan, Philippines (Seasons 3–4)
- Camera setup: Multiple-camera setup
- Running time: 90 minutes
- Production companies: UNTV; University of Asia and the Pacific; LeGit Entertainment and Media Company

Original release
- Network: UNTV
- Release: August 14, 2011 – April 28, 2013

Campus Challenge is a Philippine television quiz show broadcast by UNTV. The show ran continuously every Sunday for four seasons from August 14, 2011, to April 28, 2013. It was hosted by then-MTV VJ Jonathan "Sib" Sibulo and then-Miss Air Philippines 2018 Zahra Bianca Saldua. It is a Filipino adaptation of Arirang TV quiz show, Superkids.

== Background and Conceptualization ==
As always shown in its end credits, the show is conceptualized by Daniel Razon in response to the Department of Education's challenge to upgrade Filipino children's literacy through a high standard educational TV program. In partnership with the University of Asia and the Pacific and LeGit Entertainment and Media Company, one of the producers of the hit TV quiz show Digital LG Quiz, Campus Challenge was put into fruition. The quiz show is often dubbed to be the first in the country's national television scene since it aired in UNTV and the first within the decade to air "an academic and beyond-curricular showdown of elementary and high school students in tournament format". This is inspired following the success of its counterparts Digital LG Quiz, Battle of the Brains, Nutroplex Brain Challenge and the long-running National Quiz Bee in the 2000s.

== Locations and On-site Segments ==
The Campus Challenge episodes are mainly taped, pre-recorded, and filmed in front of a live studio audience. For the first two seasons, they were done at the PETA Theater Center in Quezon City. La Verdad Christian College in Caloocan, on the other hand, became the home for the last two seasons. Each participating school per week is also visited by one of the two hosts to have a closer look at what their schools have to offer. There were two respective on-site segments that aired: Sib's Collectors' Corner and Bianca's Book Adventures, which talk about the students' interests in numerous items and reading books. During the season-ender episodes, both hosts together with the production crew visit the schools and homes of the season champions to provide the viewers a glimpse and closer look on why they are deserving to win the show's respective season.

== Overall gameplay ==
=== Format and Contestant selection ===
Every participating school sends two representatives to the show, preferably students who are within the last two years of elementary and high school stay. In short, they send a Grade 5 and 6 tandem in the Elementary Division while a Junior and Senior tandem (3rd Year and 4th Year, respectively) is being sent in the High School Division. In the event that any of the two original representatives cannot compete, the school is advised to prepare an alternate consisting of two students of each respective year or grade level. If the alternate wins with his/her teammate and the original contestant are fit enough to compete again, the alternate shall remain as the contestant competing for his/her school.

The Campus Challenge follows a three-stage format: A Weekly Face-Off round, The Semi-Final Round (known as the Challenger Round), and the Championship/Season Finale. Four schools per division compete against one another in every episode. Whoever scores the highest at the end of each episode is automatically declared the winner. In the weekly rounds, 9 teams per division advance to the Challenger Round, whereas in this round 3 teams per division advance towards the Championship/Season Finale. The remaining 3 spots in the Challenger Round and 1 spot for the Championship/Season Finale are considered as Wildcard Entries. These are the second-highest scoring teams per stage, which in the weekly rounds are likewise considered regardless of the ranking they have placed in their episode.

In the event of a tie after the conclusion of every episode, Knockout Questions are asked by the quizmasters themselves which do not require the teams looking at the game board. There were cases wherein a Wildcard entry spot has to fill, thus a best-of-5 series format was installed where the highest-scoring team secured such spot.

=== Gameplay ===
The show features a game board consisting of 12 different categories, 7 academic and 5 non-academic/practical/beyond curricular, each with 2 questions for a total of 24 questions. The categories are as follows:

- SciTech (Science and Technology)
- In The News (Civic Studies and Current Events)
- MathTinikan (Mathematics)
- Word-O-Poly (Languages)
- Literature
- Filipiniana (Philippine Studies)
- Around The World (World History and Geography)
- Kalikasan Para Sa Kabataan (Environment and Green Energy)
- General Info
- Health, Sports, and Fitness
- Music and the Arts
- POP Culture

Every quizmaster reads the question per category twice. At any point where the quizmaster reads the question, teams may choose to buzz in and give their answers. Each question is worth 10 points. Beginning the second season, 6 of the 12 categories are marked with a red and yellow border indicating that the second question is worth 20 points. This was done in light of the success of the first season and to level up the gaming field with tougher questions.

The game also features a formal 25th question, known as the Mystery Picture, where a picture of a famous personality is hidden under the game board tiles. The team who guesses this correctly earns additional points which will help them in securing a spot in the next round. The quizmasters read a total of 3 clues involving the personality, but are only read once every 4th and 8th tile is open. There were some occasions when this rule was not followed, hence, the quizmasters were given the freedom to choose when to read them. 60 points are awarded to the team who guesses the personality correctly with 1-4 tiles of the game board open, 40 if 5-8, or 20 if 9-12. The aim of every team/contestant is to score the highest number of points. 300 points (240 points per question + 60 points from the Mystery Picture) was the perfect score in the first season while 360 points (due to the addition of the 20 point questions) was used in the second season onwards.

Contestants stand in a podium consisting of a microphone, buzzer, pens and paper (to be used for MathTinikan and on occasions Word-O-Poly questions), and certificate holders (this was only used in the Challenger Round and the Championship/Season Finale). All of their buzzers are automatically locked, meaning that whoever buzzes first will be acknowledged by the quizmasters despite numerous attempts of the other schools to try pressing the buzzer. The other teams will be acknowledged if the first team who buzzes says a wrong answer or runs out of time answering the question. Teams will only be given one chance to answer the question, which goes by the rule: the first answer is the final answer.

Every team is only given a certain amount of time to answer such questions. For every category, 20 seconds is allotted for answering the question while 10 seconds is given when a team buzzes in and still doesn't have an answer. The MathTinikan category is an exception since given that teams have pens and paper provided, they will be given 60 seconds to answer. There were some occasions wherein Word-O-Poly questions had contestants answer a question for 30 seconds since it had to involve anagrams. These respective time limits were reduced in half when the Challenger Round and Championship/Season Finale was played.

There is also a technical committee, headed by the quiz show writer, where the quizmasters or even members of the audience can refer to when there are clarifications or protests concerning the overall gameplay of the episode. The show has always reiterated that coaching from the audience or even looking at other teams while the game is ongoing isn't allowed which puts the school and team at risk for disqualification.

=== Prizes and Segments ===
The main prize of the Campus Challenge is four free full-term merit scholarships to any of the programs offered at the University of Asia and the Pacific (UA&P) where the champions' tuition and miscellaneous fees are waived 100%. This is given to recognize the elementary and high school team's academic and beyond-curricular achievement in successfully winning all 3 stages of the show. Each of the teams that entered also received certificates of recognition and participation for their achievement entering the Challenger Round and Championship/Season Finale.

Although it was only applied in the first season, all that entered the Challenger Round and Championship/Season Finale also received prizes from sponsors, mainly from REX Book Store and Sterling Paper, consisting of reference materials and school supplies. REX Book Store has also sponsored the questions for the MathTinikan category until the second season, while car manufacturer Hyundai sponsored the questions for the SciTech category until the first season's third episode.

At the end of every weekly episode, there was a short-lived segment called The Campus Challenge Audience Quiz where the quizmasters ask the audience questions similar to the actual gameplay and awarded prizes to those who answered them correctly. The prizes come mostly from Gandalf Chocolates.

== Season summary ==
=== Episode Durations ===
Season	Episodes	Premiere	Finale
1	14	August 14, 2011	November 13, 2011
2	14	November 20, 2011	March 4, 2012
3	14	October 7, 2012	January 20, 2013
4	14	January 27, 2013	April 28, 2013

=== List of Winners ===
==== Elementary Division ====
Placement	Season 1	Season 2	Season 3	Season 4
1	Mother Goose Playskool and Grade School (Marikina) (Christian Dominic Angelo Sobremonte & Khrystin Aliyah Avila)	St. Paul College (Pasig)	St. Paul College of Makati	
2	Southville International School and Colleges (Svetlana Riguera & Matthew Sybingco)	Diliman Preparatory School	International Christian Academy; Malate Catholic School; St. Vincent School (Tahanan Village)	
3	Cainta Catholic College (Sophia Catherine Reyes & Micah Unajan); Lorenzo Ruiz de Manila School (Rona Angela Grindulo & Alberto "Jam" Perez)	Philadelphia School	International Christian Academy; Malate Catholic School; St. Vincent School (Tahanan Village)	
4	Cainta Catholic College (Sophia Catherine Reyes & Micah Unajan); Lorenzo Ruiz de Manila School (Rona Angela Grindulo & Alberto "Jam" Perez)	San Felipe Neri Parochial School	International Christian Academy; Malate Catholic School; St. Vincent School (Tahanan Village)	
References				

==== High School Division ====
Season	Winner	Runner-up	Third place	Fourth place	References
1					
2					
3					
4					

== Accolades ==
Year	Award	Category	Outcome	References
2013	Anak TV Seal Award	Most Well-Liked TV Program	Won	
2012	Anak TV Seal Award	Most Well-Liked TV Program	Won	
2012	Catalogue Prix Jeunesse	Catalogue Prix Jeunesse International Quality in Children's Television Worldwide	Won	
2011	Catalogue Prix Jeunesse	Catalogue Prix Jeunesse International Quality in Children's Television Worldwide	Won	

== See also ==
- List of programs broadcast by UNTV
