= JabRef =

Reference management software

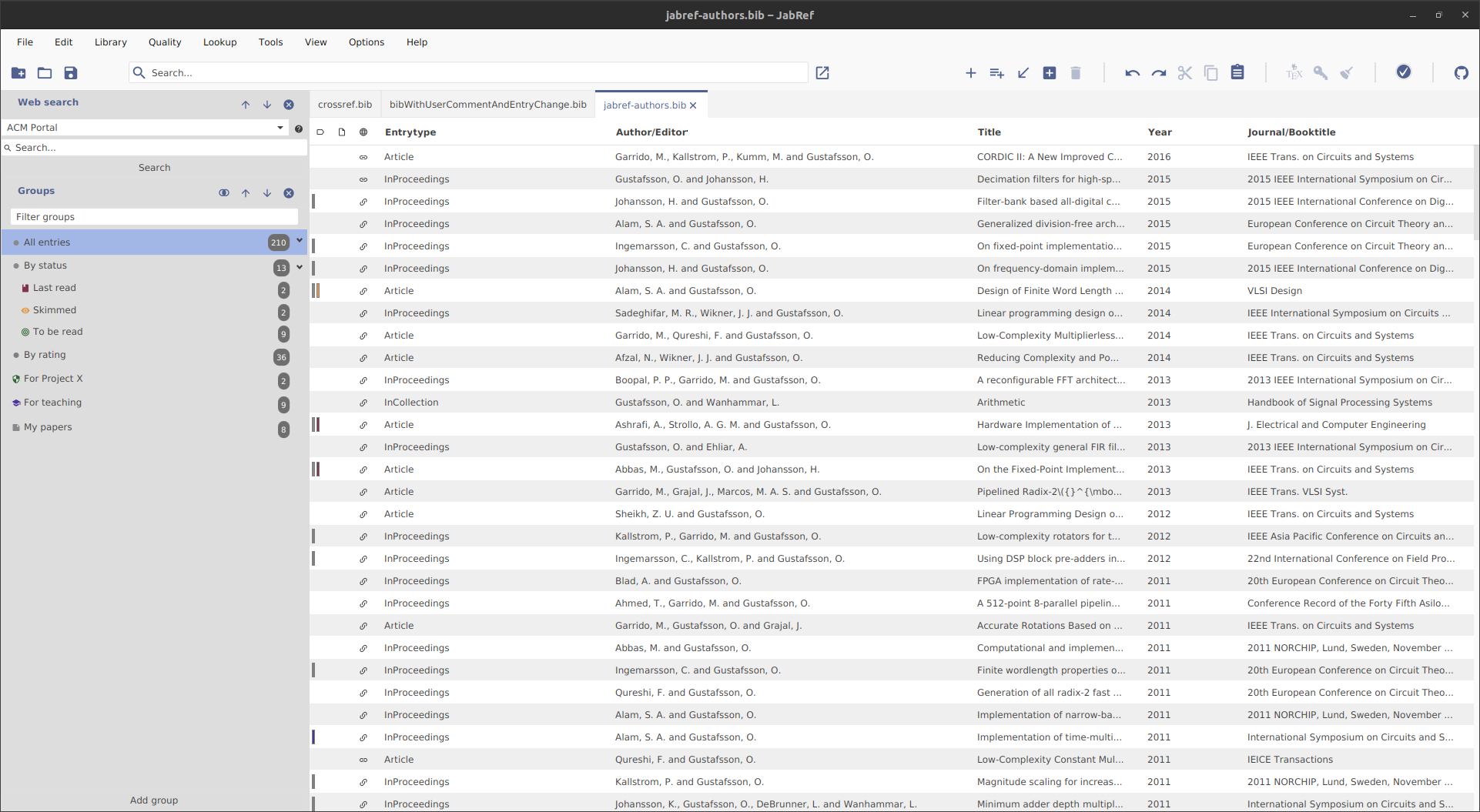
- JabRef 5.9 under Linux
- Original authors: Morten O. Alver, Nizar N. Batada, et al.
- Developer: The JabRef team
- Initial release: 29 November 2003 (22 years ago)
- Stable release: 5.15 / 10 July 2024; 21 months ago
- Written in: Java
- Operating system: Windows, macOS, Linux
- Size: 180 MB
- Available in: 23 languages
- List of languages Brazilian Portuguese, Chinese (simplified), Chinese (classical), Danish, Dutch, English, Farsi, French, German, Greek, Indonesian, Italian, Japanese, Korean, Norwegian, Polish, Portuguese, Russian, Spanish, Swedish, Tagalog, Turkish, Vietnamese
- Type: Reference management
- License: MIT License
- Website: www.jabref.org
- Repository: github.com/JabRef/jabref

JabRef is an open-source, cross-platform citation and reference management software. It is used to collect, organize and search bibliographic information.

JabRef has a target audience of academics and many university libraries have written guides on its usage. It uses BibTeX and BibLaTeX as its native formats and is therefore typically used for LaTeX. The name JabRef stands for Java, Alver, Batada, Reference. The original version was released on November 29, 2003.

== Features ==
JabRef supports Windows, Linux and Mac OS X. It is available free of charge and is actively developed.

=== Collection ===
- Import options for over 15 reference formats.
- Extraction of metadata from PDFs.
- Retrieval of articles and bibliographic information based on identifiers (arXiv, Biodiversity Heritage Library, CrossRef, DiVA, DOI, IACR eprints, ISBN, Library of Congress, MathSciNet, mEDRA, PubMed, RFC, SAO/NASA ADS, and zbMATH).
- Support for the online scientific catalogues of ACM Portal, arXiv, CiteSeer, Collection of Computer Science Bibliographies, CrossRef, DBLP, DOAJ, GVK, IEEEXplore, INSPIRE-HEP, MathSciNet, Medline, SAO/NASA Astrophysics Data System, Springer, and zbMATH.
- Browser based reference importing with the JabFox add-on for Chrome, Edge, Firefox and Vivaldi.

=== Organization ===
- Supports hierarchical groupings based on keywords, tags, search terms etc.
- Includes features for searching, filtering and detecting duplicates.
- Attempts to complete partial bibliographic data by comparing with curated online catalogues such as Google Scholar, Springer or MathSciNet.
- Citation keys, metadata fields and file renaming rules are customizable.

=== Interoperability ===
- Thousands of citation styles are built-in.
- Cite-as-you-write functionality for external applications such as Emacs, Kile, LyX, Texmaker, TeXstudio, Vim and WinEdt.
- Support for Word and LibreOffice/OpenOffice for inserting and formatting citations.
- Library is saved as a human-readable text file.
- When editing in a group, the library can be synchronized with a SQL database.

== See also ==
- Comparison of reference management software
