= List of programs broadcast by UNTV =

UNTV News and Rescue/Public Service is a UHF television network owned by the Progressive Broadcasting Corporation together with Breakthrough and Milestones Productions International (known on air as UNTV-BMPI), the network's content provider and marketing arm, and Christian religious organization Members Church of God International (MCGI), It is headquartered in Broadcast Caloocan Building, 351 EDSA, Brgy. Bagong Barrio West, Caloocan, and its hybrid analog and digital transmitter facility is located at Emerald Hills, Sumulong Highway, Antipolo. The following is a list of all television programming that UNTV is currently broadcasting since it began its television operations in 1999.

== Current original programs ==
=== Morning show ===
- Good Morning Kuya (2007; simulcast on Radyo La Verdad 1350)

=== News ===
- Hataw Balita Ngayon (2024; simulcast on Radyo La Verdad 1350)
- Ito Ang Balita (2004–2005, 2007; simulcast on Radyo La Verdad 1350)
  - Ito Ang Balita Weekend Edition (2020; simulcast on Radyo La Verdad 1350)
- UNTV C-News (2016; simulcast on Radyo La Verdad 1350)
- UNTV Newsbreak (2016)

=== News specials ===
- Repaso: The UNTV Year-End Coverage (annually; 2010, ongoing)
- Tulong Muna Bago Balita (annually; 2016, ongoing)

=== Public service ===
- Ang Inyong Kawal (2021)
- Check Up Podcast (2026)
- Huntahang Ligal (2018; simulcast on Radyo La Verdad 1350)
- Lifesaver (2019)
- Manibela (2010–2016, 2019)
- Pulis @ Ur Serbis (2012–2022, 2023)
- Serbisyong Bayanihan (2016; simulcast on Radyo La Verdad 1350)
- Sumbong N'yo, Aksyon Agad (2023)

=== Educational ===
- KNC Show (2004–2026, 2026)

=== Sports ===
- UNTV Cup (2013)
- UNTV Volleyball League (2023)

=== Religious ===
- Ang Dating Daan (2004)
  - Ang Dating Daan: Mandarin Edition (2008)
  - Ang Dating Daan: Worldwide Bible Study (2021)
- MCGI Global Prayer for Humanity (2020)
- MCGI Cares (2022)
- How Authentic The Bible Is (2004)
- Itanong mo Kay Soriano (Ang Dating Daan: Worldwide Bible Exposition) (2004)
- Truth in Focus (2004)
- UNTV Community Prayer (2013)

== Previously aired programs ==
- ~~911-UNTV (2015–2019)~~
- ~~A Day in the Life of (2015–2016)~~
- ~~Ads Unlimited (2004–2005)~~
- ~~Alarma (2008–2010)~~
- ~~Ano sa Palagay Mo? (2004–2005)~~
- ~~Arangkada Na! (2015)~~
- ~~Are They Contradictory? (2004–2006)~~
- ~~ASOP By Request (2015–2016)~~
- ~~ASOP Music Festival (2011–2025)~~
- ~~ASOP Music Festival: Grand Finals Night (October 2012; December 29, 2013; November 2014; November 2015)~~
- ~~Ating Alamin (2010–2013)~~
- ~~Ayon sa Bibliya (2004–2006)~~
- ~~Balls & Stick (2008–2009)~~
- ~~Bantay OFW (2008–2010)~~
- ~~Barangay Hoopsters (2008–2010)~~
- ~~Barangay Showbiz (2004–2005)~~
- ~~Bayanihan (2013–2015)~~
- ~~Believer TV (2005–2008)~~
- ~~Bible Exposition (2004–2005)~~
- ~~Bible Guide (2004–2006)~~
- ~~Biblically Speaking (2004–2005)~~
- ~~Bidang Pinoy (2011–2012)~~
- ~~Bihasa: Bibliya Hamon Sa'yo (2007–2008)~~
- ~~Bitag Live (formerly known as Bahala si Tulfo, Bahala sina Ben at Erwin Tulfo, and Bahala si Bitag) (2004–2013)~~
- ~~Bread N' Butter (2004–2005, 2008–2016)~~
- ~~Bread Tambayan (2007–2011)~~
- ~~Breakthrough (2004–2005)~~
- ~~Certified Kasangbahay (2007–2016)~~
- ~~Cook Eat Right (2011–2016)~~
- ~~Campus Challenge (2011–2013)~~
- ~~Candidly Speaking with Willie (2010–2011)~~
- ~~Checkpoint (2008–2010)~~
- ~~Chika Mo, Chika Ko (2004–2008)~~
- ~~Climate Change: Ang mga Dapat Malaman ni Juan (2010)~~
- ~~Dating Buhay (2017)~~
- ~~The Dive Philippines (2017–2023)~~
- ~~D'X-Man (2004–2017, 2017–2023)~~
- ~~Dito Po Sa Amin (2004–2005, 2010)~~
- ~~Doc on TV (2007–2011)~~
- ~~Doctors on TV (2011–2026)~~
- ~~Easy Lang Yan! (2010–2016)~~
- ~~Eat My Shorts (2001–2004)~~
- ~~Estranghero (2010–2013)~~
- ~~Ex - Files (2005–2006)~~
- ~~Face Off (2010)~~
- ~~FAQ's (2004–2005)~~
- ~~Fastbreak News (2010–2012)~~
- ~~Five Missions (2021)~~
- ~~Frontliners (2014–2016)~~
- ~~Get It Straight with Jay and Willie (2008–2010)~~
- ~~Get It Straight with Daniel Razon (2010–2023)~~
- ~~Go, NGO! (2008–2010)~~
- ~~Hataw Balita (2005–2013, 2016–2017)~~
- ~~Hataw Balita News Update (2007–2012)~~
- ~~Hataw Balita Newsbreak (2012–2016)~~
- ~~Hataw Balita Pilipinas (2020–2024)~~
- ~~Hataw Balita Primetime (2007)~~
- ~~Hatol ng Bayan: UNTV Election Coverage (2007)~~
- ~~Healing Galing sa UNTV (2020–2023)~~
- ~~Hometown: Doon Po Sa Amin (2007–2008)~~
- ~~Huntahan (2012–2014)~~
- ~~In the Raw (2001–2004)~~
- ~~Istorya (2008–2016, 2017–2022)~~
- ~~Justice on Air (2013–2016)~~
- ~~Kaagapay (2006–2016)~~
- ~~Kapitbahay at Kapitbisig (2004)~~
- ~~Kaka at Claire, Kaagapay Niyo (2006)~~
- ~~Kaka in Action (2005–2006)~~
- ~~Kakampi Mo Ang Batas (2004–2007)~~
- ~~Kami Naman! (2006–2008)~~
- ~~Katha (2007–2008)~~
- ~~Kids at Work (2004–2005)~~
- ~~Kayo ang Humatol! (2010–2011)~~
- ~~Kilalanin Natin (2010–2011)~~
- ~~Kilos Pronto (2016–2017, moved to PTV 4)~~
- ~~Klasrum (2011–2016)~~
- ~~Kulay Pinoy (2004–2005)~~
- ~~Law Profile (2010–2016)~~
- ~~Legally Yours with Atty G. (2016)~~
- ~~Maestra Viajes (2005–2009)~~
- ~~Make My Day with Larry Henares† (2003–2020)~~
- ~~Manic Pop Thrill (2001–2004)~~
- ~~Mapalad Ang Bumabasa (2005–2016)~~
- ~~Mr. Fix It (2004–2005)~~
- ~~Munting Pangarap (2008–2018)~~
- ~~My OFW Story (2014)~~
- ~~New Generation (2005–2006)~~
- ~~Oras ng Himala (2003–2004)~~
- ~~Out of Time (2001–2004)~~
- ~~Pangarap ng Puso (2004–2005)~~
- ~~Pilipinas, Gising Ka Na Ba? (2005–2007)~~
- ~~Playback (2003–2004)~~
- ~~PMS (2003–2004)~~
- ~~Police and Other Matters (2011–2014)~~
- ~~Polwatch: UNTV Election Coverage (2010, 2013, 2016, 2019, 2022, 2025)~~
- ~~Polwatch: Political Watch (2009–2016)~~
- ~~Pondahan ni Kuya Daniel (2013–2020)~~
- ~~Public Hearing (2005–2007)~~
- ~~QUAT: Quick Action Team (2011–2015)~~
- ~~Rise N' Shine (2012–2015)~~
- ~~Roam (2001–2004)~~
- ~~Rotary in Action (2010–2020)~~
- ~~Serbisyo Publiko (2004–2014)~~
- ~~Showbiz Overload (2008–2009)~~
- ~~Sound Connections (2004–2007)~~
- ~~Spotlight (2008–2011, 2012–2016, 2017–2018)~~
- ~~Sports 37 (2007–2016)~~
- ~~Start Your Day The Christian Way (2005–2010)~~
- ~~Startist (2005)~~
- ~~Strangebrew (2001–2004)~~
- ~~Tapatan with Jay Sonza: Bayan ang Humatol (2004–2005)~~
- ~~Teleskuwela (2004–2005)~~
- ~~Thanksgiving Day (2005–2007)~~
- ~~The Legacy Continues (2021–2022)~~
- ~~Tinig ng Marino (2014–2016, moved to PTV 4)~~
- ~~Trip Ko 'To! (2019–2022)~~
- ~~UNTV Music Videos (2001–2004)~~
- ~~UNTV News (2012–2016)~~
- ~~UNTV News Worldwide (2020–2024)~~
- ~~Usapang Kristiyano (2005–2008)~~
- ~~Weird Doctrines (2004–2005)~~
- ~~What's Up Doc? (2004–2007)~~
- ~~Why News (2015–2024)~~
- ~~Wish 1075 TV (2016)~~
- ~~Wishclusive Music Videos (2016, airing intermittently)~~
- ~~Wonderful Pinas (2024–2025)~~
- ~~Workshop on TV (2004–2005)~~

== See also ==
- UNTV
