= Sib Sibulo =

Jonathan Solomon Salva Sibulo, more popularly known as Sib, is a Filipino television personality. He was the host of Jack TV’s The Sib Show (later renamed The Jackyard). He had previously won the hosting gig, along with Sam Oh (of ETC’s Rated Oh! fame) on Solar Entertainment’s Face-Off (2004), a televised, albeit cable, hosting competition. During his stint on Jack TV he hosted various television programs and live events for the channel.

In 2007, Sibulo was one of 3 winners of the MTV VJ Hunt 2007 (alongside Kat Alano and Andi Manzano). He is currently active on 4 shows on MTV Philippines, namely Campus Crashers, Uploaded on MTV (which he co-hosts with Kat Alano), Timeout, Full Tank, and occasionally hosts Gimme 10. Sib also works as a radio DJ on U92 with his own radio talk show, Shatterday Saturday.

In-between his stint on Jack TV and MTV Philippines, he had also worked as a host for Shop TV.

Sibulo has consistently hosted afternoon slots for Pulp Magazine’s Pulp Summerslam for the last 3 years (2006–2008).

Sibulo also hosts Tower of Doom’s yearly nationwide (Philippines) rock show tour, the Tower of Doom Siege Tour.

Sibulo also hosts various school/youth oriented and corporate events.

Sibulo graduated with a degree in philosophy from the Ateneo de Manila University.

Right now, together with Bianca Saldua, Sibulo currently hosts UNTV's first quiz show suited for elementary and high school students to win scholarships, Campus Challenge

In 2013 until 2015, he co-hosted a show called That Show in the NMF Network together with fellow MTV VJ Kat Alano and Basti Artadi of Wolfgang.
