= Ramon Tulfo =

Filipino journalist and TV host (born 1946)

Mon Tulfo
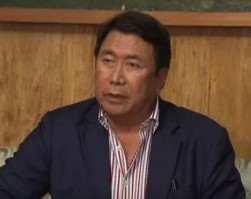
- Born: Ramon Teshiba Tulfo Jr. November 22, 1946 (age 79); Davao City, Davao (now Davao del Sur), Philippines
- Other names: Mon Tulfo (known as the host of Isumbong Mo kay Tulfo); Kuya Mon (T3: Kapatid Sagot Kita)
- Occupations: Broadcaster; TV and radio host Columnist
- Years active: 1970s–present
- Political party: Reporma
- Children: Michelle Tulfo (daughter); Patrick Tulfo (son); Ramon "Bon" Tulfo III (son); Catherine Tulfo-Victoria (daughter); Gem Tulfo-Soriano (daughter); Cecile Tulfo (daughter); Nastassja Ramone Tulfo (daughter)
- Parents: Ramon S. Tulfo Sr. (father, deceased); Caridad Teshiba Tulfo (mother, deceased)
- Relatives: Ben Tulfo (brother); Raffy Tulfo (brother); Erwin Tulfo (brother); Wanda Tulfo Teo (sister); Ralph Tulfo (nephew)
- Website: Mon Tulfo's Official Website

Ramon "Mon" Teshiba Tulfo Jr. (Tagalog: [ɾaˈmɔn ˈtulfo]; born November 22, 1946) is a Filipino TV host, radio broadcaster, newspaper columnist, and government official.

== Early life and career ==
Ramon Teshiba Tulfo Jr. is the eldest of ten siblings, with six brothers and three sisters, namely Tuchi, Bong, Joseph, Edelle, broadcasters Raffy, Ben, Erwin, as well as former tourism secretary Wanda Corazon Teo. He is the son of the late Colonel Ramon Silvestre Tulfo Sr. (September 5, 1915 – June 14, 1985) who was a member of Philippine Constabulary, and Caridad Teshiba-Tulfo, a housewife, who died in 2024, at the age of 97. Due to his father's occupation, his family moved throughout the country, one location after the other. Ramon Tulfo is the host of the 23-year running program Isumbong Mo kay Tulfo! (Tell It to Tulfo!), a public service program on DZRJ Radyo Bandido. In his hour-long show, he and his co-host Alin Ferrer tackle community problems, including complaints filed against government officials and policemen. He is the brother of Wanda Tulfo Teo, and broadcaster/hosts Ben Tulfo, Senator Raffy Tulfo and Senator-elect Erwin Tulfo who all have their own brands of public service programs. Raffy Tulfo was one of the candidates being suggested by PDP–Laban to run for senator, that eventually he won in the May 2022 polls.

Wanda, along with Ben, Raffy and Erwin, became involved in a 60-million peso corruption scandal which happened while Wanda Teo was the tourism chief.

== Career ==
Tulfo began his career as a radio announcer, serving various stations throughout the Philippines for three years. He later became a newspaper columnist, working at Bulletin Today (now the Manila Bulletin) for nearly a decade before moving to the Philippine Daily Inquirer in the 1980s. In 1984, Tulfo received an Investigative News Reporting award at the 8th Catholic Mass Media Awards for his police beat reporting at Bulletin Today during 1983.

Tulfo occasionally hosts TV5's T3: Kapatid Sagot Kita along with his brothers Ben, Raffy and Erwin.

=== Special envoy to China ===
On October 23, 2018, President Rodrigo Duterte appointed Tulfo as the special envoy for public diplomacy to China. He was to hold the post for six months, and had a salary of ₱1 per year. His term was extended for another six months on May 27, 2019. However, as of February 24, 2021, he was unsure if he was still the special envoy to China. According to him, even though his term had already lapsed, his appointment was not revoked either. He also expressed willingness to give up his post to become a Philippine distributor of the Sinopharm BIBP COVID-19 vaccine.

Ramon Tulfo

Government Position: Special Envoy for Public Diplomacy to the People's Republic of China

Second Term: May 27, 2019 - November 27, 2019

First Term: October 23, 2018 - April 23, 2019

== Controversies ==
=== Airport brawl with Claudine Barreto and Raymart Santiago ===
The Movie and Television Review and Classification Board investigated the show, following its May 7, 2012, episode, in which the hosts issued threats to celebrity couple Raymart Santiago and Claudine Barretto in connection with the brawl with their brother Ramon Tulfo at Ninoy Aquino International Airport Terminal 3 on May 6. They made a public apology the following day, but they were still suspended from hosting the show as well as other News5 programs aired in TV5 and AksyonTV for 3 days from May 9–11, 2012.

The MTRCB suspended the show from May 10 to 17. Ramon Tulfo, Martin Andanar and Atty Mel Sta. Maria hosted the May 9 episode before the suspension. TV5 questioned the agency's action, declaring that it could threaten the freedom of the press. A television version of Relasyon from Radyo5 92.3 News FM, hosted by Luchi Cruz-Valdez and Mel Sta. Maria, filled up the T3's timeslot from May 10–11. As of May 14, the timeslot was occupied by Sharon: Kasama Mo, Kapatid and Metro Aksyon which was extended to 30 minutes, carrying T3's format, aside for bringing news. The suspension was later lifted by the MTRCB effective May 17, only 7 days into the scheduled 20-day suspension after the settlement of MTRCB and TV5 and returned on air on the following day.

From May 30 – June 20, 2012, T3 was once again suspended after a "thorough deliberation" by the MTRCB adjudication board. T3's timeslot, once again, was filled up by Metro Aksyon with T3 hosts Ben and Raffy Tulfo anchoring. On June 20, 2012, 3 weeks into the scheduled 3-month suspension, the Court of Appeals issued a 60-day temporary restraining order (TRO) to stop the suspension.

=== Social and political views ===
Tulfo has been widely criticized for his public support of the death penalty, whether the case is considered a heinous crime or not. He has voiced opposition to LGBT rights, and has also criticized the Iglesia ni Cristo due to 'personal hatred'. Tulfo has also outspokenly discriminated Muslim Filipinos, using jokes against Islamic beliefs during the height of killings against Muslims in the Philippines. He also drew flak after stating that Muslims in Christian-majority areas should be removed and relocated in war-torn areas in Mindanao.

=== Philippine General Hospital incident ===
On August 15, 2018, Mr. Tulfo caused a ruckus at the emergency room department of the Philippine General Hospital. In a video posted on Facebook, Mr. Tulfo can be seen harassing an emergency room physician after the doctor did not want to be recorded on video by Mr. Tulfo prior to providing medical treatment to a child who sustained minor injuries when Mr. Tulfo's convoy hit the child on the same day. Video recording in hospital premises is in violation of the Philippine Data Privacy Act of 2012, as well as in violation of the patient's right to privacy and right to consent. The victim's mother was also seen to be pleading to Mr. Tulfo to stop his harassment as her daughter was getting scared of the ordeal. As of August 20, 2018. Mr. Tulfo has refused to apologize to PGH for the incident

=== Libel and cyberlibel charges ===
Government officials had filed libel (Revised Penal Code) and cyberlibel (Cybercrime Prevention Act of 2012) charges against Tulfo since 2019.

Former executive secretary Salvador Medialdea first filed these complaints against Tulfo, along with five others from The Manila Times, before the Manila Prosecutor's Office in relation to the latter's articles accusing the official of corruption and using his power to harass journalists. Tulfo posted bail in 2020 before Manila Regional Trial Court Branch 12.

Also in 2019, same complaints were also filed separately by Bureau of Internal Revenue officials, commissioner Caesar Dulay and executive assistant Adonis Samson, against Tulfo and The Manila Times officials and editors at the Quezon City Prosecutor's Office. Both were related to a series of articles alleging corruption within the agency, the latter also involved Tulfo's social media post.

Cyberlibel charge was also filed against him in 2022 by former Justice secretary Vitaliano Aguirre before the Manila RTC for his columns published in the Philippine Daily Inquirer accusing the official as the alleged protector of syndicates behind the so-called "pastillas" scam at Ninoy Aquino International Airport. In May, he was arrested at the Manila City Hall based on the warrant issued by Manila RTC Branch 24.

In March 2020, he voluntarily surrendered to police after Manila RTC Branches 10 and 46 released arrest warrants against him over undisclosed cyberlibel cases.

As of May 2023, the cases filed by Medialdea and Aguirre are pending in courts.

== Personal life ==
Some sources and even his own column in The Manila Times hint that there is occasional friction between the Tulfo siblings, particularly between him, Ben and Raffy, resulting in mutually scathing criticism for the other. However, they have been known to work together as one, with the Mabalacat drug den raid being such an example. Raffy, Erwin and Ben also came to his aid when he was assaulted in the airport, going as far as airing a veiled death threat to the perpetrators.

As of June 2022, his Isumbong Mo Kay Tulfo public service brand has been inherited by his son, Ramon "BON" Tulfo III, and rebranded as Sumbong Mo, Aksyon Ko.

His grandson, Ramon Enrique (b. 1998), the son of Patrick, committed suicide on October 26.
