= Wanda Tulfo Teo =

Filipino travel agent (born 1952)

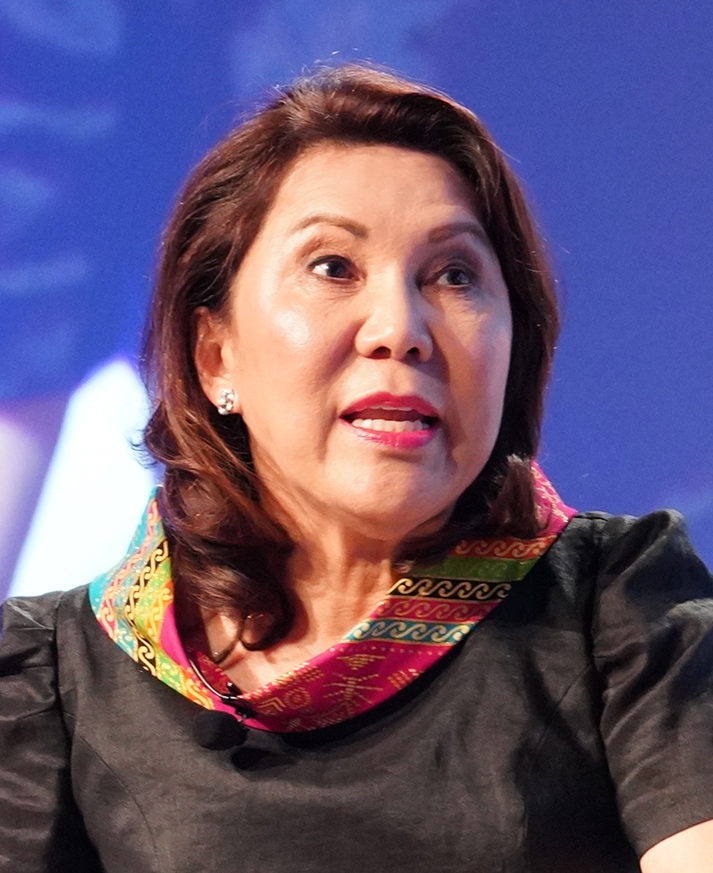
- Tulfo Teo in 2018

Secretary of Tourism
- In office June 30, 2016 – May 8, 2018
- President: Rodrigo Duterte
- Preceded by: Ramon Jimenez Jr.
- Succeeded by: Bernadette Romulo-Puyat

Personal details
- Born: Wanda Corazon Teshiba Tulfo; November 4, 1952 (age 74) Manila, Philippines
- Party: PDP–Laban
- Spouse: Roberto Teo
- Relations: Ramon Tulfo (brother); Ben Tulfo (brother); Raffy Tulfo (brother); Erwin Tulfo (brother); Ralph Tulfo (nephew)
- Education: St. Theresa's College (Quezon City)
- Occupation: Businessperson

Wanda Corazon Teshiba Tulfo-Teo (Tagalog: [ˈtulfo ˈteɔ]; born November 4, 1952) is a Filipino travel agent who served as Secretary of the Philippines' Department of Tourism under the Duterte administration from July 2016 until her resignation on May 8, 2018.

== Early life and education ==
Tulfo-Teo was born Wanda Corazon Teshiba Tulfo in Manila on November 4, 1952, to Ramon Silvestre Tulfo Sr. and Caridad Alvar Teshiba in Kidapawan, Cotabato, a housewife, who died in 2024, at the age of 97. She has two sisters and seven brothers, namely Tuchi, Bong, Joseph, Edelle, broadcasters Ramon, Ben and Erwin.

For her elementary education, Tulfo-Teo attended the Notre Dame of Jolo College in Sulu and for her high school studies attended Pillar College of Zamboanga City where she graduated from in 1969. She obtained a bachelor's degree in business administration from St. Theresa's College in Quezon City.

== Career ==
Tulfo-Teo has been actively working in the tourism sector for more than two decades. In the 1970s she was employed by airlines and later served in various tourism-oriented organizations.

=== Early years ===
In the 1970s, she worked as a flight attendant for Filipinas Orient Airways and Air Niugini Airways. In the same period, she also worked as ground personnel for Philippine Airlines and was assigned to its ticketing office. From 1980 to 1981, she taught business administration at Ateneo de Davao University as an instructor and worked as an account manager for GT Philippines from 1980 to 1995.

She is the co-owner of Mt. Apo Travel and Tours, a travel agency, serving as its president from 1994 to June 2016, when she divested herself of any involvement in the company following her appointment to the Department of Tourism.

=== Affiliations ===
Tulfo-Teo served as president of the National Association of Independent Travel Agencies (NAITAS), the biggest travel agency organization in the country. She is a member of Davao Travel Agencies Association (DTAA), the Davao Association of Tour Operators (DATO) and the Davao Regional Tourism Council (DRTC).

=== As tourism secretary ===
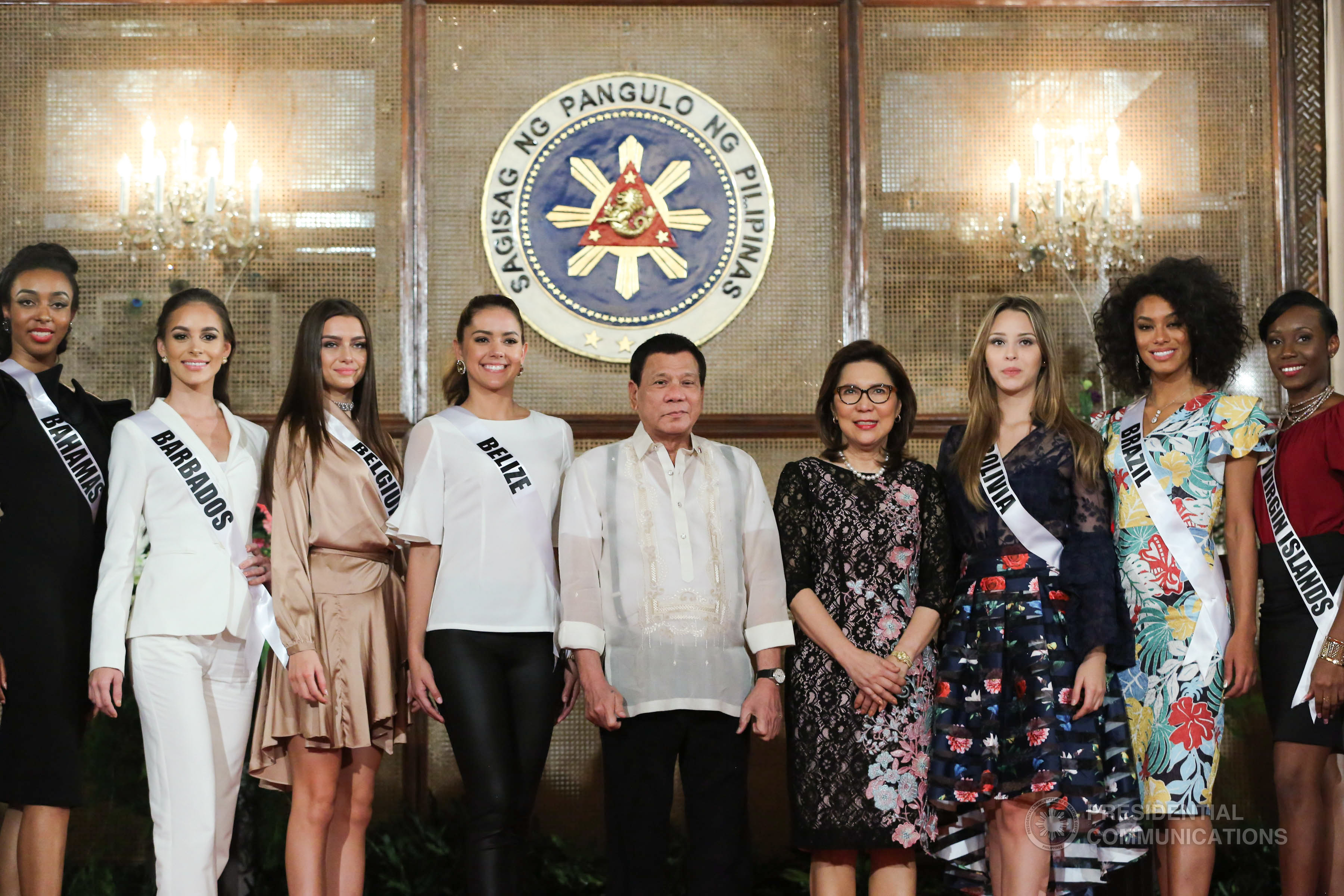
Rodrigo Duterte (center) and then-Tourism Secretary Wanda Tulfo Teo (fourth from right), flanked by candidates of the Miss Universe 2016 pageant.

Tulfo-Teo was appointed as Secretary of the Department of Tourism by President Rodrigo Duterte on June 30, 2016, replacing Ramon Jimenez Jr. Teo initially stated that she would change the prevailing tourism slogan coined by her predecessor Jimenez, "It's More Fun in the Philippines", during her term, but she later decided to instead improve on it because of its positive effects that resulted in invaluable tourist arrivals in the Philippines. She said she lacked any credentials and remarked, "I had nothing to show as my accomplishments."

As secretary, she was involved in talks to secure the hosting rights of the Miss Universe 2016 pageant which was hosted in the Philippines in January 2017. The DOT under her watch was also involved in talks to host Miss Universe 2018 which was planned to be held in a rehabilitated Boracay in November 2018.

On May 8, 2018, Tulfo-Teo resigned from her post after the Commission on Audit revealed she directed the placement of P60 million in tourism ads to Kilos Pronto, a blocktimer show on PTV-4, despite lack of a memorandum of agreement or contract. Kilos Pronto is produced and hosted by Teo's brothers Ben Tulfo and Erwin Tulfo, both of whom are allied with Rodrigo Duterte. Teo stressed that she 'did not know' that her own brothers were running the very specific television show she sent P60 million to. The Tulfo brothers afterwards promised that they will return the P60 million of government funds that they received from their sister. However, the siblings later retracted, saying that they maintain their innocence and refuse to return the government funds used in the deal. Tulfo-Teo was succeeded by Bernadette Romulo-Puyat who promised to review the Philippines' possible hosting of the Miss Universe 2018 pageant. Romulo-Puyat dropped the Philippines' hosting bid due to budgetary concerns.

=== Return to private life ===
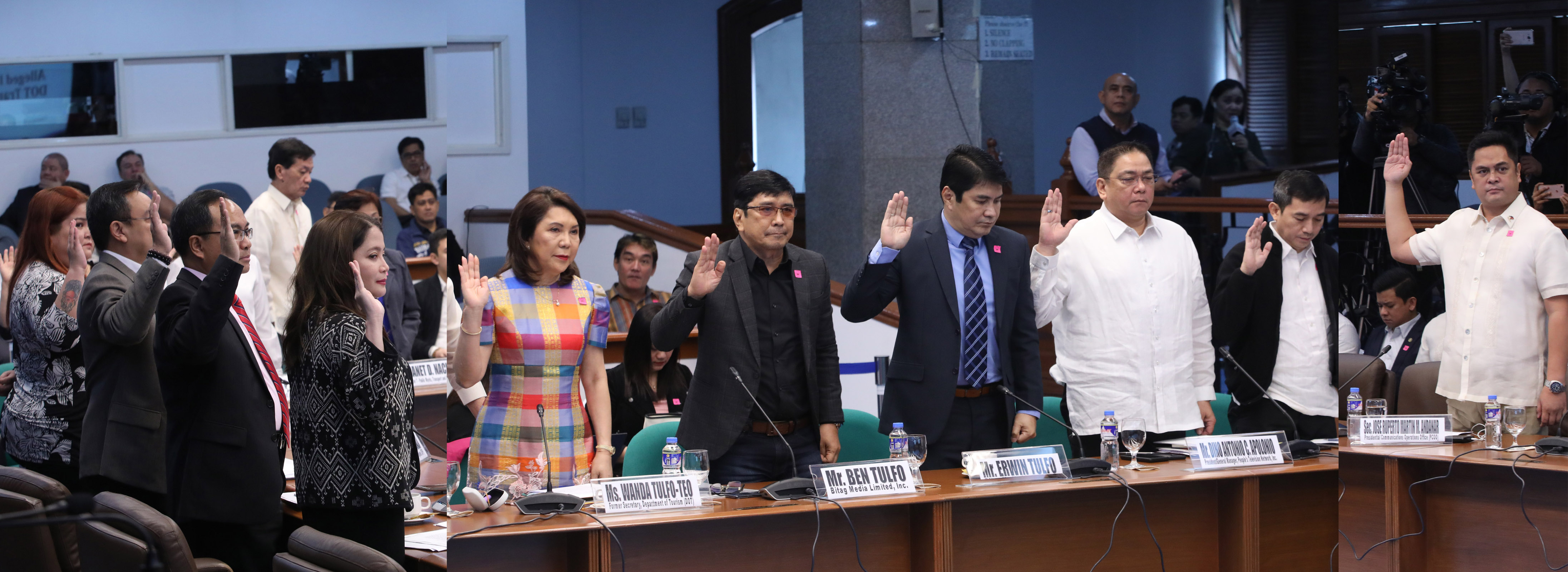
Senate inquiry on the 60-million corruption scandal of Wanda Tulfo Teo and her brothers Ben Tulfo and Erwin Tulfo.

As of June 17, 2018, Erwin Tulfo and Ben Tulfo had not yet returned the P60 million in government funds that Wanda Teo gave them during her stint as tourism secretary. On June 28, 2018, the Commission on Audit revealed that resigned tourism secretary Wanda Tulfo Teo and a former Tourism executive took millions worth of luxury goods from Duty Free stores in 2017 and charged them as consultancy fees using funds meant for the department's programs. In August 2018, during a Senate hearing, Tulfo-Teo and her siblings, Ben Tulfo and Erwin Tulfo, declared that they will never return the money they got from the Department of Tourism, sparking nationwide outrage and backlash.

== Personal life ==
Wanda Tulfo-Teo's four brothers are journalists namely: Ramon, Jr. (Mon), Ben, Raffy and Erwin Tulfo. Tulfo-Teo's husband Roberto "Bobby" U. Teo is currently a member of the board of directors of LBP Leasing and Finance Corporation, a subsidiary of government-owned bank Land Bank of the Philippines.

== See also ==
- Tourism in the Philippines

Political offices
Preceded by Ramon Jimenez Jr.	Secretary of Tourism; 2016–2018	Succeeded by Bernadette Romulo-Puyat
