= Tutok Tulfo =

Philippine news show

- Genre: Documentary; Investigative journalism
- Created by: Associated Broadcasting Company
- Developed by: News5
- Directed by: Braulio Bayno
- Presented by: Erwin Tulfo
- Country of origin: Philippines
- Original language: Filipino
- No. of episodes: 123

Production
- Editors: Edwin Pineda; Francis Ventura
- Camera setup: Multiple-camera setup

Original release
- Network: TV5
- Release: March 13, 2010 – August 4, 2012

Related
- Bitag; Wanted

Tutok Tulfo (English: Focus (to) Tulfo) is a Philippine television documentary show broadcast by TV5. Hosted by Erwin Tulfo, it aired from March 13, 2010 to August 4, 2012, and was replaced by Reaksyon Weekend.

== History ==
Tutok Tulfo first aired on TV5 on March 13, 2010, and ended on August 4, 2012. It was hosted by Erwin Tulfo It originally aired at 5:30 p.m. (PST), before being moved to late nights along with Aksyon Weekend to make way for Willing Willie. It had an early telecast every Saturday on AksyonTV at 7:00 p.m. (PST).

In September 2011, the program reformatted to become more documentary-investigative leaning with several topics discussed over multiple weeks. To cater to the new format, Tulfo mostly ventured outside the studio as a pre-taped program with additional man-on-the street interviews.

On December 24, 2021, PTV's management confirmed that Tulfo decided to part ways with the network. He made his final appearance on Ulat Bayan and Tutok Erwin Tulfo on June 27, 2022, and was later replaced by Audrey Gorriceta as the Main Anchor on December 22, 2021 & Maan Macapagal on March 21, 2022.

An officially canceling the program. However, its sister radio program Radyo Pilipinas continued airing until June 27, 2022, when Tulfo left the network and transferred to DSWD Secretary relief anchor Aljo Bendijo filling in the gap. On June 27, 2022, former DZAR anchor Mike Abe took over the timeslot with Mike Abe Live, ending the second run of Tutok Erwin Tulfo.

== Host ==
- Erwin Tulfo

== See also ==
- List of TV5 (Philippine TV network) original programming
