= T3: Alliance =

Philippine defunct public affairs show

- Also known as: T3: Kapatid, Sagot Kita! (2011–12); T3: Reload (2012–14); T3: Enforced (2014–15)
- Genre: News magazine, public service
- Created by: TV5 Network Inc.
- Developed by: News5
- Directed by: Benedict Carlos
- Presented by: Ben Tulfo; Raffy Tulfo; Erwin Tulfo
- Narrated by: Martin Andanar
- Opening theme: "T3 music theme" composed by Reev Robledo
- Country of origin: Philippines
- Original language: Filipino

Production
- Executive producers: Eric Montas (live); Ana V. Puod (editorial)
- Camera setup: Multi-camera setup
- Running time: 45 minutes

Original release
- Network: TV5
- Release: September 5, 2011 – April 16, 2016

Related
- Bitag; Wanted; Tutok Tulfo

T3: Alliance (formerly known as T3: Kapatid, Sagot Kita!, T3: Reload and T3: Enforced) is a Philippine television public service show broadcast by TV5. Hosted by Ben Tulfo, Raffy Tulfo, and Erwin Tulfo, it aired from September 5, 2011 to April 16, 2016.

== History ==
This program airs every Weekdays at 5:30 p.m. to 6:00 p.m. (PST) before Aksyon except for TV5 (TV21) Cebu viewers which air Aksyon Bisaya and replays on Monday to Thursday between midnight. The show is on TV5 that simulcast also on radio thru Radyo5 92.3 News FM.

Starting July 21, 2014, the program will be transfer to noontime timeslot from 12:30 to 1:00 pm after the noontime newscast Aksyon sa Tanghali anchored by Raffy Tulfo and his new newscaster partner Cherie Mercado. Raffy Tulfo was also a former anchor of the network's first noontime newscast Balitaang Tapat with his former news partner Amelyn Veloso (now with Solar News). The show also has a replay telecast on weekdays at 10:30 pm.

On August 18, 2014, the program will be aired from 12:45 to 1:30 pm. The program stopped its radio simulcast on Radyo5 due to the radio program Relasyon during noontime.

After 4 years of airing over weekdays, T3 Alliance was moved to Saturdays beginning April 11, 2015, giving way for TV5's entertainment talk show Showbiz Konek na Konek, to serve as the weekend public service program and newscast of News5.

Starting November 8, 2015, T3: Alliance moved to its new timeslot, every Sunday at 1:30pm, after Alagang Kapatid.

Starting March 5, 2016, T3: Alliance returned to its new timeslot, every Saturday at 2:30pm, after Alagang Kapatid.

== Hosts ==
=== Main hosts ===
- Ben Tulfo
- Raffy Tulfo
- Erwin Tulfo

== Program portions ==
- 'Anlabo Nyo!' - Irregularities in the Public Office and the Community with the Aid of an Amateur Videos.
- 'Tutok Tulfo' (formerly Ambush) - Segment version of TV5's Saturday Show from 2010 to 2012.
- 'Bitag' (formerly Modus) - Operations, which document actual Bitag operations in coordination with law enforcement elements.
- 'Missing' - Runaway kids; abducted children; lolos and lolas gone missing.
- 'Sagot Kita, Kapatid' - Public service, the old fashioned way. Wheelchairs and medicines for the needy.
- 'Saludo' - T3's version of "honor roll" (inspired by ABS-CBN's defunct Hoy Gising); professionals get a pat in the back for quick response to complaints and problems.
- 'Wanted' (formerly Resbak) - Segment version of Wanted sa TV where Tol Raffy investigates cases of abuse, dishonesty and exploitation.

== Controversies ==
=== Mon Tulfo vs. Barretto/Santiago airport brawl ===
The Movie and Television Review and Classification Board is currently investigating the show, following its May 7, 2012, episode, in which the hosts issued threats to celebrity couple Raymart Santiago and Claudine Barretto in connection with the brawl with their brother Ramon Tulfo in Ninoy Aquino International Airport Terminal 3 on May 6. They made a public apology the following day, but they were still suspended from hosting the show as well as other News5 programs aired in TV5 and AksyonTV for 3 days from May 9–11, 2012. The MTRCB suspend the show from May 10 to 17. Ramon Tulfo, Martin Andanar and Atty Mel Sta. Maria hosted the May 9 episode before the suspension. TV5 is questioning the agency's action, declaring that it could threaten the freedom of the press. A television version of Relasyon from Radyo5 92.3 News FM, hosted by Luchi Cruz-Valdes and Mel Sta. Maria, is filled up the T3's timeslot from May 10–11. As of May 14, the timeslot was occupied by Sharon: Kasama Mo, Kapatid and Metro Aksyon which was extended to 30 minutes, carrying T3's format, aside for bringing news. The suspension was later lifted by the MTRCB effective May 17, only 7 days into the scheduled 20-day suspension after the settlement of MTRCB and TV5 and returned on air on the following day.

From May 30 – June 20, 2012, T3 was once again suspended after a "thorough deliberation" by the MTRCB adjudication board. T3's timeslot, once again, filled up by Metro Aksyon with T3 hosts Ben and Raffy Tulfo anchoring. On June 20, 2012, 3 weeks into the scheduled 3-month suspension, the Court of Appeals issued a 60-day temporary restraining order (TRO) to stop the suspension. It is expected to return on air on June 25.

=== Carabuena vs. Fabros road rage incident ===
On August 11, 2012, the T3 crew saw the brawl between Robert Blair Carabuena, an executive in the Phillip Morris and Saturnino Fabros, an MMDA enforcer in Quezon City. It was shown on the August 13 edition of the show. It was a trending topic in social media when Fabros became popular while Carrabuena was suspended by the company, but he made a public apology with MMDA Chairman Francis Tolentino a few weeks later. Fabros refused to accept his apology. Fabros was promoted to a Rank II traffic enforcer.

== See also ==
- Bitag
- Tutok Tulfo
- List of TV5 (Philippine TV network) original programming
- News5
- Hoy Gising!
