= Bitag =

2002 Philippine television public service show

- Title card until 2023
- Also known as: Bitag Live; Bitag: Next Generation
- Genre: Public service Investigative journalism
- Created by: BITAG Media Unlimited Inc.
- Directed by: Ben Tulfo
- Presented by: Ben Tulfo
- Country of origin: Philippines
- Original languages: Tagalog, English

Production
- Running time: 60 minutes

Original release
- Network: ABC/TV5 (2002–03; 2011–12) (Bitag); IBC (2003–11; 2019; 2023–present); CLTV36 (2023–2025; 2026–present); UNTV (2004–13); PTV (2012–23); AksyonTV (2013–17) (Bitag Live)
- Release: September 14, 2002 – present

Bitag (lit. 'Trap') is a Philippine television public service show broadcast by ABC/TV5, IBC, PTV and CLTV36. Hosted by Ben Tulfo, it aired ABC from September 14, 2002 to February 22, 2003. The show moved to IBC from 2003 to October 7, 2011, TV5 from October 14, 2011 to August 3, 2012, replacing Totoo TV and was replaced by Reaksyon, PTV from August 11, 2012 to July 6, 2019 and returned to IBC from September 7 to November 2, 2019. Its success also spawned a recap (later talk) show that aired during weekday mornings as Bitag Live (formerly Bahala si Tulfo, Bahala sina Ben at Erwin Tulfo and Bahala si Bitag) broadcast by UNTV, AksyonTV, PTV, IBC, DZME and DWUN. It aired on UNTV from July 12, 2004 to 2013. The show moved to AksyonTV from 2013 to June 30, 2017, PTV from August 15, 2017 to January 6, 2023, and IBC from January 30, 2023 to January 31, 2024. Since January 30, 2023, Bitag Live, along with #ipaBITAGmo, is currently airing on IBC from 8:00 AM to 9:00 AM. The program is also streamed in various social media platforms such as Facebook and YouTube.

Bitag was also a segment of the now-defunct TV5 public service program T3: Alliance, where Ben co-hosts with his brothers, Erwin and Raffy Tulfo.

== Format ==
An episode usually contains 3 different cases set to stock film, music and industrial sound effects sardonically narrated by Ben before wrapping it up with an educational segment sponsored by PAGCOR. Bitag operates semi-autonomously, conducting reconnaissance and surveillance and deploys their own agents as undercovers. When enough intelligence is gathered, Ben coordinates with the local authorities to plan the manner of arrest and follows them with his convoy of security back-ups and camera men to document the entire procedure and its aftermath. In accordance with Ben's eschewal of "drama" and production in favor of "real reality", most cases air days after the shoot with minor cuts and editing used only to fit the documented footage under 10 minute segments. This is further proven by Ben's occasional absence in his AksyonTV show Bitag Live on weekdays, when he personally oversees certain case operations.

There are times where government agencies themselves invite BITAG to document an impending operation, popularly with drug raids. This has occurred several times in the show, and one instance united the four Tulfo broadcasters together.

The programs segments are classified according to their nature:

- Operations, which document actual Bitag operations in coordination with law enforcement elements.
- Updates, or follow-up reports on the status of successful Bitag operations.
- Kilos Pronto segments, which showcase immediate action or assistance on complaints or concerns.
- Akto segments, usually depicting irregularities or "questionable" situations unexpectedly encountered by Bitag (caught in the act).
- Wanted, a new segment featuring the apprehension of a "wanted" criminal.
- Recap, Replays of existing episodes, often as reminders to the public.

For safety reasons, the Bitag strike force is fully armed and trained in self-defense disciplines (including Ben Tulfo himself) and comprises professional security personnel. They are also allowed to carry their firearms in airplanes and vessels provided they surrender it prior to departure. However, the team still makes it a point to request assistance from the local authorities when dwelling in unfamiliar territory in accordance with the law.

Bitag was originally pitched to other TV networks but an unidentified "Tulfo" was opposed to it.

== Bitag in TV Networks (IBC 13, TV5, Aksyon TV and PTV 4) ==
When the contract on IBC expired, Ben Tulfo did not renew. Ben Tulfo moved his TV show to AksyonTV, the sister channel of his former network, TV5. He teamed up with his brothers from the other stations and made a TV show called T3.

On October 14, 2011, he officially returned to TV5, replacing Totoo TV. Another spin-off premiered on AksyonTV entitled Pinoy US Cops Ride Along where it chronicles the operations of Filipino police officers in the United States. Both Bitag and Pinoy US Cops later moved to PTV, albeit in a producer's cut variety and in broadcast syndication, while the UNTV version continued to air Fridays in a commercial-free tandem with Pinoy US Cops: Ride Along in a director's cut.

At the start of 2013, Bitag left UNTV due to internal issues. Bitag Live then found a home on AksyonTV; furthermore the Bitag segment on T3: Reload was revived after it was renamed 'Caught in the Act' following the said program's reformat. Coincidentally, the said station also airs brothers Erwin and Raffy's own programs Punto Asintado and Wanted sa Radyo respectively, as well as T3: Reload, all of which also simulcast on radio through DWFM.

In its Aksyon TV incarnation, it is an all-discussion segment where Ben Tulfo freely discusses relevant issues exclusively. It has since been extended all the way to social media, prominently in the program's Facebook presence, to reach out to Filipinos overseas.

The show stayed in TV5 until moving out of the station and returned to PTV 4, where it stayed until January 6, 2023, then returning once more to IBC-13 after.

== Awards and recognitions ==
- Winner, Best Public Service Program – 2005, 2007, 2008, 2010 & 2011 PMPC Star Awards for Television
  - On IBC-13 (2005)
  - On UNTV-37 (2007 & 2008, 2010 & 2011)
- Winner, Best Public Service Program Host for Ben Tulfo – 2005, 2008 & 2009 PMPC Star Awards for Television

== See also ==
- List of Philippine television shows
- Kilos Pronto
- List of TV5 original programming
- List of programs broadcast by UNTV
- List of programs broadcast by People's Television Network
- Wanted sa Radyo
