= DZME =

Radio station in Metro Manila, Philippines

ME Radio (DZME)
- Pasig; Philippines
- Broadcast area: Mega Manila and surrounding areas
- Frequency: 1530 kHz
- Branding: ME Radio

Programming
- Language: Filipino
- Format: News, Public Affairs, Talk

Ownership
- Owner: Capitol Broadcasting Center; (Jose M. Luison and Sons, Inc.)

History
- First air date: June 15, 1968
- Former frequencies: 1540 kHz (1968–1978)

Technical information
- Licensing authority: NTC
- Power: 25,000 watts

Links
- Webcast: https://www.amfmph.com/dzme-1530-am-1482.html
- Website: www.dzme1530.ph

DZME (1530 AM), on-air as ME Radio, is a radio station owned and operated by Capitol Broadcasting Center in the Philippines. The station's studio is located at Unit 1802, 18th Floor, OMM Building, San Miguel Ave., Ortigas Center, Pasig, and its transmitter is located at #78 Flamengco St., Brgy. Panghulo, Obando, Bulacan.

DZME can be viewed on cable television on Cablelink and Sinag Cable Channel 5 as ME Radio TV.

DZME has recently been honored by multiple award-giving bodies for its responsible and balanced programming. It won Best Teleradyo Station of the Year (World Class Excellence Japan Awards), Most Outstanding Local Radio Station (Asian Sterling Business Awards), and Most Trusted Radio Station (Legacy Awards), while ranking among the Top 10 Mega Manila AM stations per Kantar-KBP and Nielsen.

== History ==
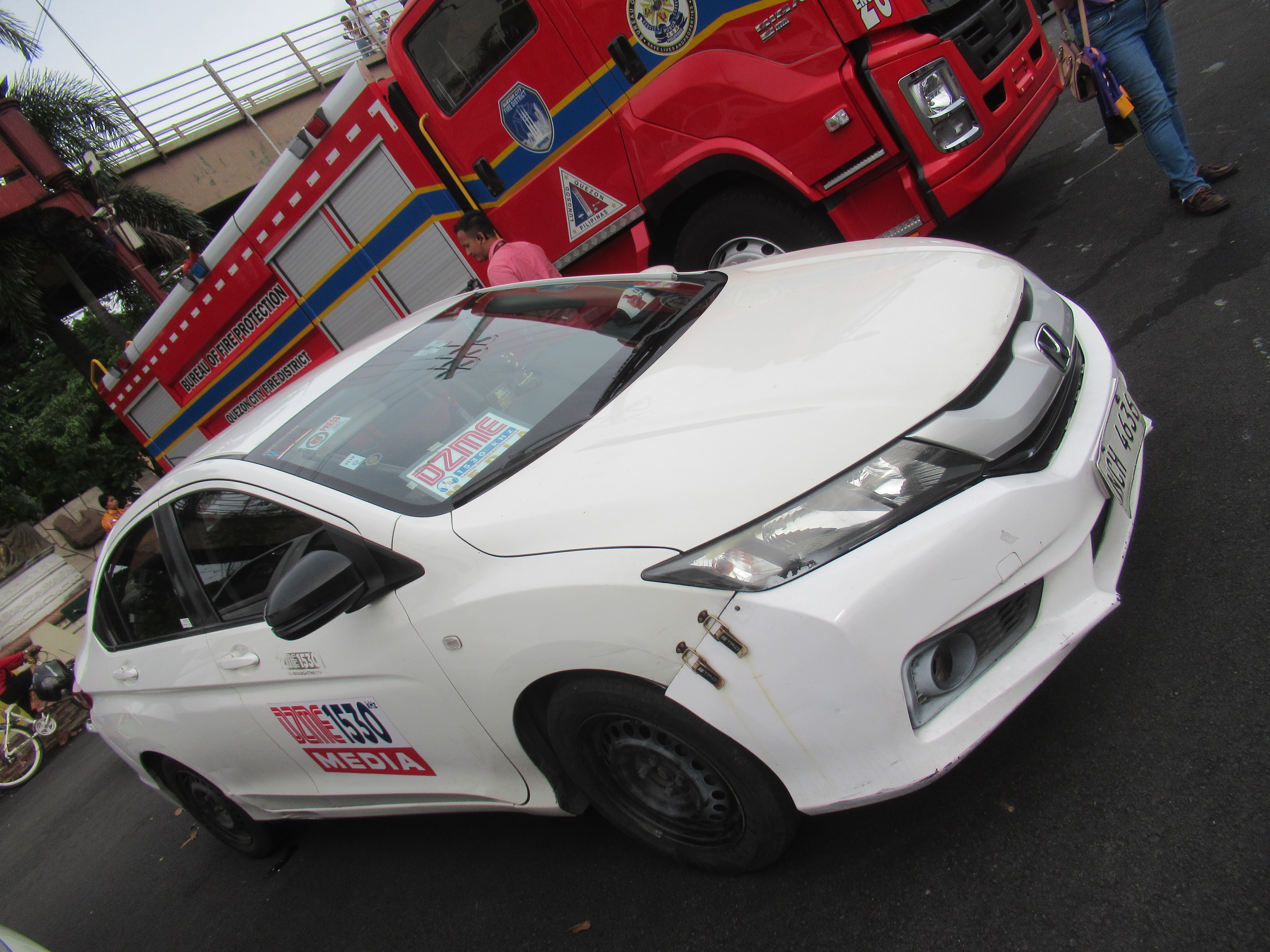
Vehicle at Batasan Hills, Quezon City, Metro Manila

DZME, owned by the Luison family and led by Atty. Joey Luison Jr., commenced broadcasting on June 15, 1968. Initially operating on 1540 kHz, the station was reassigned to its current frequency of 1530 kHz in November 1978.

In October 1987, President Corazon Aquino, acting through the National Telecommunications Commission, ordered DZME shut down for several months. The shutdown, citing a grave risk to national security, came after the station aired controversial right-wing propaganda and commentary critical of her administration during a series of unsuccessful coup attempts by right-wing rebel groups. DZME returned to the air on January 1, 1988.

In 1996, a new group of investors, including former Surigao del Sur Congressman Prospero Pichay Jr., took over the assets and properties of the radio station from the Luison family.

Logo From 2008 to 2014

In 2004, DZME adopted the Radyo Uno brand, coinciding with the acquisition of its Harris transmitter.

In 2009, as part of its expansion, DZME relocated from its long-time Roosevelt Avenue (now Fernando Poe Jr. Avenue) site in Quezon City to Victory Central Mall in Monumento, Caloocan. The former Roosevelt Avenue location now houses a Bank of the Philippine Islands branch. Concurrently, the development of regional affiliates strengthened its nationwide presence, leading to the launch of Like Radio.

From November 2013 to January 2014, some of its programs (except for newscasts) were temporarily suspended and replaced with music fillers due to technical upgrades and the transfer of the studios to the OMM-Citra Building in Ortigas Center, Pasig.

After Holy Week 2015, the Radyo Uno brand was dropped. Later, in the fourth quarter of 2016, DZME enhanced its programming lineup and revitalized its news division. The station also launched new programs while retaining a few of its old ones.

From May 2023 to 2025, DZME used the Radyo Uno branding. In May 2026, it adopted the ME Radio branding.

== Notable on-air personalities ==
=== Current ===
- Prospero “Butch” Pichay Jr.
- Benny Abante
- Master Hanz Cua
- Frank Lloyd Mamaril

=== Former ===
- Chino Trinidad†
- Ben Tulfo
