= Ben Tulfo =

Filipino media personality and executive (born 1955)

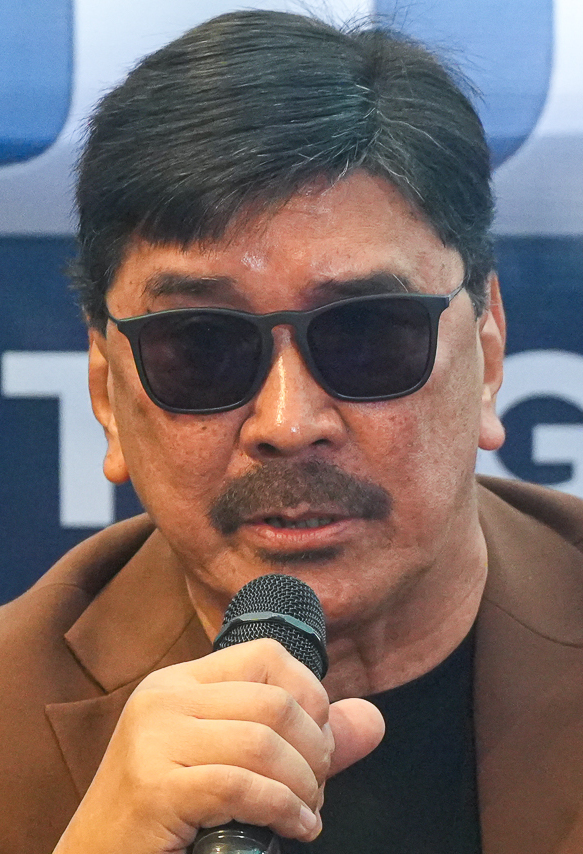
- Tulfo in 2025
- Born: Bienvenido Teshiba Tulfo; March 15, 1955 (age 71); Dansalan, Lanao (now Marawi, Lanao del Sur), Philippines
- Other names: Bitag; Ben Bitag; Tol Ben; Morning Man
- Occupations: Radio and TV personality, entrepreneur, production company executive
- Years active: 1996–present
- Agents: News5 (2002–03; 2011–17) PTV (1997–2002, 2016–23) IBC (2003–11; 2019; 2023–present); CLTV36 (2023–2025; 2026–present)
- Notable credit(s): BITAG, Kilos Pronto, Pinoy US Cops, Pambansang Sumbungan,
- Political party: Independent (since 2024)
- Spouse: Marijean Marquez
- Parents: Ramon S. Tulfo Sr. (father); Caridad Teshiba Tulfo (mother)
- Relatives: Ramon Tulfo (brother); Raffy Tulfo (brother); Erwin Tulfo (brother); Wanda Tulfo Teo (sister); Ralph Tulfo (nephew)
- Website: bitagmedia.com

Bienvenido "Ben" Teshiba Tulfo (Tagalog: [bɪɛnbɛˈnidɔ ˈtulfo]; born March 15, 1955) is a prominent Fillipino crime buster, advocate, and media executive. Also known as "BITAG", he serves as the CEO of BITAG Multimedia Unlimited Inc. (BMUI) and actively volunteers for the NGO Ipabitagmo Inc. He is primarily known for producing and hosting Bitag, a reality public service television program that first aired on ABC (now TV5) from 2002 to 2003 and later on IBC from 2003 to 2011. He has also produced shows such as Pinoy US Cops, Bitag Live, and Kilos Pronto.

== Early life and education ==
Bienvenido Teshiba Tulfo was born on March 15, 1955 in Dansalan (later renamed Marawi), Lanao to Ramon Tulfo Sr., a colonel in the Philippine Constabulary, and Caridad (née Teshiba), a housewife, who died in 2024, at the age of 97. His siblings include Tuchi, Bong, Joseph, Edelle, Ramon, Raffy and Erwin, the latter three of whom are all his fellow journalists, as well as Wanda Tulfo Teo.

== Career ==
=== TV, radio, and print ===
In 1994, Ben conceptualized the television program Isumbong Mo Kay Tulfo and was aired on RPN-9. His brother Ramon hosted the program but after its successful launch, Ben left the show. By 1997, he launched Philippines Most Wanted (patterned closely to America's Most Wanted) on PTV-4 but later expanded from TV to radio (through DZXL (defunct)). The program was hosted together with his brother, Raffy. However, after a year of hosting Philippines Most Wanted, he left the program which in turn, leaving Raffy to go solo.

Ben later returned to the field of broadcast media in 2001. His program, Bahala si Tulfo (Now BITAG Live) was later offered a mid-morning time slot by DZME. He was later offered to be the editor-in-chief for the Manila Standard, then he wrote his column for Saksi Ngayon, a sister publication of the Manila Standard.

While BST Tri-Media was conceived in 2002, he became a columnist for Philippine Star's Tagalog counterparts: Pilipino Star Ngayon and Pang Masa. As of 2017, he is still writing for these columns.

On July 4, 2005, UNTV Channel 37's Daniel Razon offered him to join UNTV and be one of their anchors. He became one of the hosts of Pilipinas, Gising Ka Na Ba? which was immediately followed by Bahala si Tulfo from 9 a.m. to 10:30 a.m. after What's Up Doc?. It was also simulcast at DZME.

Erwin later joined Ben at UNTV in 2006. Bahala si Tulfo was later renamed to Tulfo Brothers: Bahala si Ben at Erwin. However, in June of the same year, Erwin left to host Isumbong Mo – Tulfo Brothers at RPN-9. Ben went solo again and renamed the show back to its original title.

In 2011, TV5 offered Ben to co-anchor with his two other brothers for T3. In addition, Ben offered TV5 his Pinoy US Cops to be shown at TV5's sister television station AksyonTV.

2013 was a rough year for TV5 as it faced ailing finances. This does not stop him from staying as a talent-host for T3 together with Erwin and Raffy. However, T3 officially folded up in April 2016. This caused the brothers to part ways with separate commitments within the network.

In June 2017, Ben and Erwin decided to cut ties with TV5. He also pulled out BITAG Live and later moved to PTV.

=== BITAG ===
According to Ben Tulfo, the concept of BITAG was conceived during a Maundy Thursday (March 28) vacation at the Plantation Bay in Mactan, Cebu in 2002, with the unique idea of a documentary reality (often shortened as "docu-reality") show.

He then formed BST Tri-media Production (Now known as BITAG Media Unlimited Incorporated) to produce BITAG as a block timer. Its official launch was on September 14, 2002, a date often mistaken by fans and former production staff to be its original "anniversary". The show was then aired on ABC Channel 5 (Now TV5). BITAG focuses on ensnaring criminals and their modus operandi with elaborate documentation, surveillance and hidden cameras, often with coordination with the authorities. They also feature drug raids in coordination with the Philippine Drug Enforcement Agency and other law enforcement elements. As producer, director and host of BITAG, Tulfo stated that he considered the program to be "not a job[...] but a way of life. I am and I will always be a ronin, or a masterless warrior. I am not at the mercy of the networks unlike other hosts."

The show ran for 2 years on ABC5. Ben was then offered a primetime slot together with a co-production contract by Intercontinental Broadcasting Corporation (IBC-13) back in 2004. After signing the contract immediately, Bitag began airing on its first episode with IBC-13, and gained a large following in Philippine television.

For eight years, BITAG ran strong at IBC-13 and UNTV. Ben's Bahala si Tulfo was eventually reformatted into BITAG Live. In 2010, ABS-CBN's The Filipino Channel (TFC) wanted to show BITAG on their channel and was subsequently offered a timeslot for BITAG to be shown overseas.

As of 2011, BITAG and BITAG Live were still airing on their respective channels. BITAG was with IBC-13, while BITAG Live aired in the morning on UNTV.

In the last quarter of 2012, TV5 offered Ben an exclusive contract for BITAG. This move prompted him to terminate his contract with IBC-13 and pull out BITAG on ABS-CBN TFC, a result of the said contract.

In March 2013, Ben conducted changes to his shows. His daily analysis show, BITAG Live, moved to Radyo5 92.3 News FM (now 92.3 Radyo5 True FM) which simulcasts at AksyonTV. From here, he officially concluded his contract with UNTV. In October of the same year, TV5 was later marred with financial limitations, which prompted Ben to move both BITAG and Pinoy US Cops to PTV-4. BITAG Live was unaffected with these changes, thus, allowing him to host his daily show as well.

Right after the financial fiasco at TV5 back in 2013, BITAG together with Pinoy US Cops were moved to PTV-4 and later considered as syndicated programs from 2014 up to the present. For an extended period of time, Ben did not accept any exclusive contracts from other media networks.

In October 2018, Tulfo was criticized for his misleading report on a statement issued by United Nations Secretary-General António Guterres, in which he falsely claimed that Guterres' statement was in support of president Rodrigo Duterte's national drug war.

Until 2023, BITAG still airs during primetime Saturdays on PTV-4 with replays and news episodes being produced from the ground up. BITAG Live later moved as a daily show up to this day in PTV-4 then simulcast at Radyo Pilipinas 738 AM band. Select episodes of the shows are also available and simulcast live in social media.

Ben's BITAG Media Unlimited Inc. returned to IBC-13 in 2023, and is officially a content provider, acquiring the primetime blocks, transferring all of his television shows there.

=== Kilos Pronto ===
Starting as a segment in BITAG Live, Kilos Pronto's nature is also similar to that of the full-blown program, a call-to-action public service entity. It was supposed to launch as a separate program away from BITAG Live but it never happened.

In October 2016, Kilos Pronto successfully launched as a full-blown one hour program at UNTV. The show was hosted by Ben Tulfo together with Alex Santos and the late Nikka Alejar. Similar to the segment's roots, it was also a fast-paced program featuring call-to-action public service. However, instead of being a single segment, the show covered different complaints (ranging from local disputes and anomalies) and featured tourist attractions, delicacies, and other tourism-related events through a segment called "Travel Pass".

However, Ben Tulfo had to part ways with UNTV in January 2017, and then transferred to a new home, the state-run channel PTV-4. In June of the same year, Erwin Tulfo, hosted Kilos Pronto together with his brother after parting ways with TV5.

Numerous time slot changes occurred throughout the course of the program. During its run with UNTV, the show aired from 6:45 PM to 7:45 PM, then later on PTV-4, it ran from 7:00 PM to 8:00 PM, and then from 5:00 PM to 6:00 PM. However, to accommodate Erwin as he is also a newscaster for PTV News, Kilos Pronto later moved to an earlier time slot of 4:30 PM to 5:30 PM.

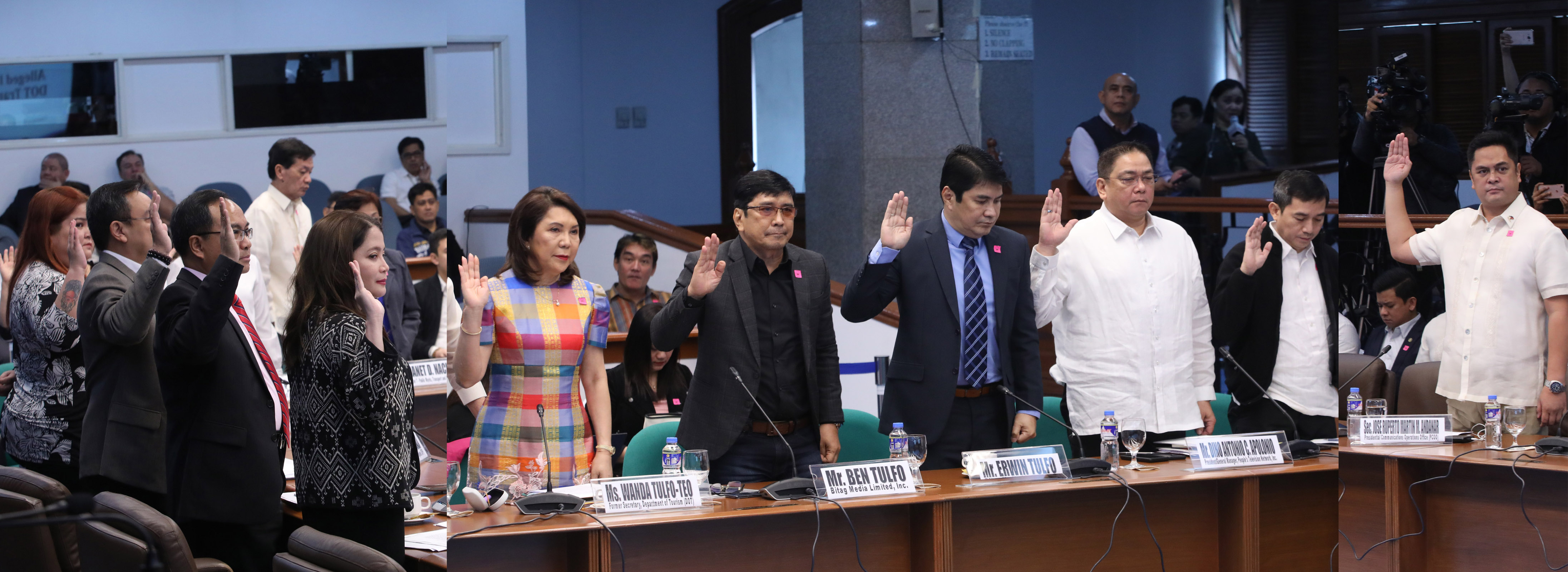

On May 8, 2018, his sister Wanda Tulfo Teo resigned from her post after the Commission on Audit revealed she directed the placement of P60 million in tourism ads to Kilos Pronto, a blocktimer show on PTV-4, despite lack of a memorandum of agreement or contract. Kilos Pronto is produced and hosted by Teo's brothers Ben Tulfo and Erwin Tulfo, both are allied to Rodrigo Duterte. Teo stressed that she 'did not know' that her own brothers were running the very specific television show she sent 60 million pesos to. The Tulfo brothers afterwards promised that they will return the 60 million pesos of government fund that they received from their sister. On June 17, 2018, it was revealed that Erwin and Ben Tulfo have not yet returned the 60 million in government funds that Wanda Teo gave them during her stint as tourism secretary. In August 2018, under a Senate hearing, Tulfo and his siblings declared that they will never return the money they got from the Department of Tourism, sparking nationwide outrage and backlash.

=== Outside of media ===
From 1998 to 2000, Ben ventured in food extrusion technology, a direction that is completely different from his roots. His clients include Universal Robina, Purina, and Feedmix, an agriculture company in the Philippines. Most of the marketed extrusion utilities came from a Kansas-based food extrusion manufacturer.

==== Unsuccessful senatorial bid ====
In 2024, Tulfo filled his candidacy to run in the 2025 Senate election. although his brother Erwin also ran in the senate under the Alyansa para sa Bagong Pilipinas slate, Ben preferred to run as an independent instead. Ben also shuns the idea of forming a "Tulfo dynasty" should both he and Erwin joined Raffy in the senate.

Despite being positioned inside the winning circles on multiple surveys, he lost the election, placing 13th in the official results. Erwin, who won as senator, said that the people only want "2 Tulfos" in the senate.

== Personal life ==
In 2024, Tulfo admitted to having a tumultuous experience in his marriages, stating that "I made some mistakes in my life, [but] I can always say that I'm a good father, [...] I'm not a good husband." He remarried sometime after being widowed from his first wife.

Tulfo listed Marijean Marquez as his "estranged" wife in his certificate of candidacy for senator in the 2025 elections.

== Awards and nominations ==
Year	Award	Category	Nominated work	Results
2005	PMPC Star Awards for Television	Best Public Service Program Host	Bitag	Won
