= Erwin Tulfo =

Senator of the Philippines since 2025 and broadcaster (born 1964)

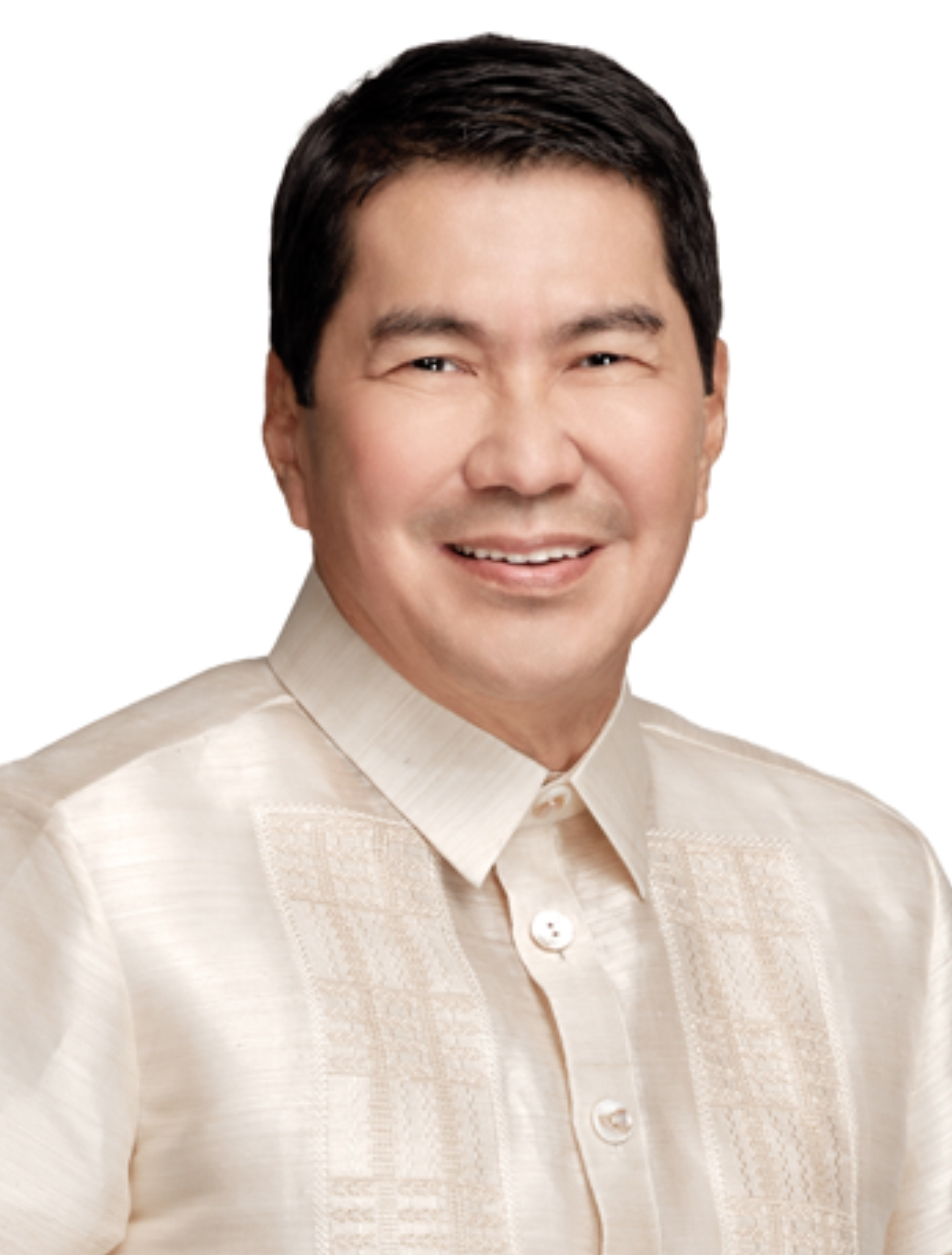
- Tulfo in 2026

Senator of the Philippines
- Incumbent
- Assumed office June 30, 2025
Senate positions
Chair of the Senate Committee on Games and Amusement
Incumbent
Assumed office July 28, 2025
Preceded by	Lito Lapid
Chair of the Senate Committee on Social Justice, Welfare and Rural Development
Incumbent
Assumed office July 29, 2025
Preceded by	Imee Marcos

Member of the House of Representatives for ACT-CIS
- In office May 30, 2023 – June 30, 2025

Chair of the House Committee on Games and Amusements
- In office August 9, 2023 – June 30, 2025
- Preceded by: Joseph Bernos
- Succeeded by: Antonio Ferrer

Secretary of Social Welfare and Development
- Ad interim
- In office June 30, 2022 – December 27, 2022
- President: Bongbong Marcos
- Preceded by: Rolando Joselito Bautista
- Succeeded by: Edu Punay (OIC)

Chairperson of Senate Blue Ribbon Committee
- Incumbent
- Assumed office June 3, 2026
- Acting; October 8, 2025 – November 11, 2025
- Preceded by: Panfilo Lacson
- Succeeded by: Panfilo Lacson

Personal details
- Born: Erwin Teshiba Tulfo; August 10, 1964 (age 62) Tacloban, Leyte, Philippines
- Citizenship: Philippines, United States
- Party: Lakas (2024–present)
- Other political affiliations: ACT-CIS (party-list; 2023–2025)
- Spouses: Rizalina Aquino; Karen Padilla-Tulfo
- Relations: Ben Tulfo (brother); Raffy Tulfo (brother); Ramon Tulfo Jr. (brother); Wanda Tulfo Teo (sister); Ralph Tulfo (nephew)
- Children: 10
- Parents: Ramon S. Tulfo Sr.; Caridad Teshiba
- Education: University of the East (BSBA)
- Occupation: Broadcaster; TV and radio host; columnist

Erwin Teshiba Tulfo (Tagalog: [ˈʔɛɾwin ˈtulfo]; born August 10, 1964) is a Filipino politician, news anchor, and columnist who has served as a senator of the Philippines since 2025. He previously served as the representative for ACT-CIS Partylist and as a deputy majority leader of the Philippine House of Representatives from 2023 to 2025. He previously served as the secretary of social welfare and development from June 30 to December 27, 2022, when his appointment was blocked and bypassed by the Commission on Appointments, during the presidency of Bongbong Marcos.

After his father Ramon Tulfo Sr. died in 1985, Tulfo moved to the United States with a tourist visa and spent a decade as an undocumented worker, which he claimed was done to support his family. A member of the Tulfo family of broadcasters, he was first hired as a news reporter at ABS-CBN upon returning to the Philippines in the 1990s, anchoring various news programs at the network such as TV Patrol and Pulso and hosting the shows Magandang Gabi... Bayan, Magandang Umaga, Bayan and Private I.

He co-hosted PRTV Prime Media's primetime newscast Arangkada Balita in 2025, alongside Niña Corpuz. He also hosted PTV's primetime news program Ulat Bayan from 2020 to 2022, as well as one of its AM radio counterparts: Radyo Pilipinas Uno's Erwin Tulfo: Live! or Tutok: Erwin Tulfo (2017–2022). On TV5, Tulfo hosted the programs Tutok Tulfo (2010–2012) and T3: Alliance (2011–2016), and anchored the news program Aksyon from 2010 to 2017. He has also previously worked for Radio Philippines Network (RPN) and Intercontinental Broadcasting Corporation (IBC).

== Early life ==
Erwin Teshiba Tulfo was born in Tacloban on August 10, 1964, He has eight siblings, among whom include Tuchi, Bong, Joseph, Edelle, Ramon, Ben, and Raffy Tulfo, who are all his fellow journalists. His brother, Raffy, is an incumbent senator, while his sister, Wanda Corazon Teo, was a tourism secretary during the Duterte administration.

During his unsuccessful 2022 congressional confirmation hearings for secretary of social welfare and development, Tulfo was alleged by representatives Oscar Malapitan (Caloocan–1st) and Rodante Marcoleta (SAGIP) to have served in the United States Army from 1988 to 1992 and assigned on a tour in Europe from 1992 to 1996. He graduated with a Bachelor of Science in Business Administration from the University of the East in 2005. He is the host of his public service brand Mission X, which eventually evolved into the Erwin Tulfo Action Center.

== Career ==
=== Secretary of Social Welfare and Development (2022) ===
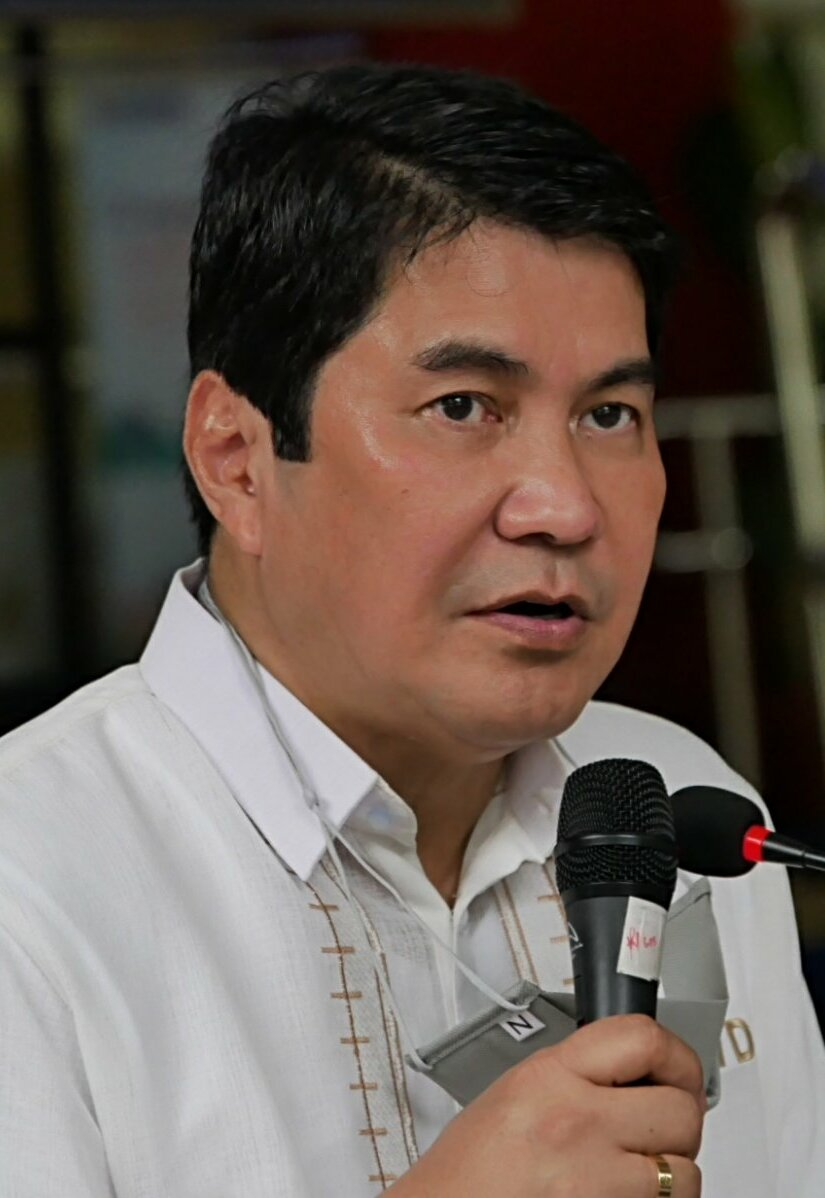
Tulfo in 2022

In 2022, Tulfo was appointed secretary of social welfare and development by then-President-elect Bongbong Marcos in May 2022. However, on December 27, 2022, his appointment was blocked and bypassed by the Commission on Appointments due to citizenship issues.

=== House of Representatives (2023–2025) ===
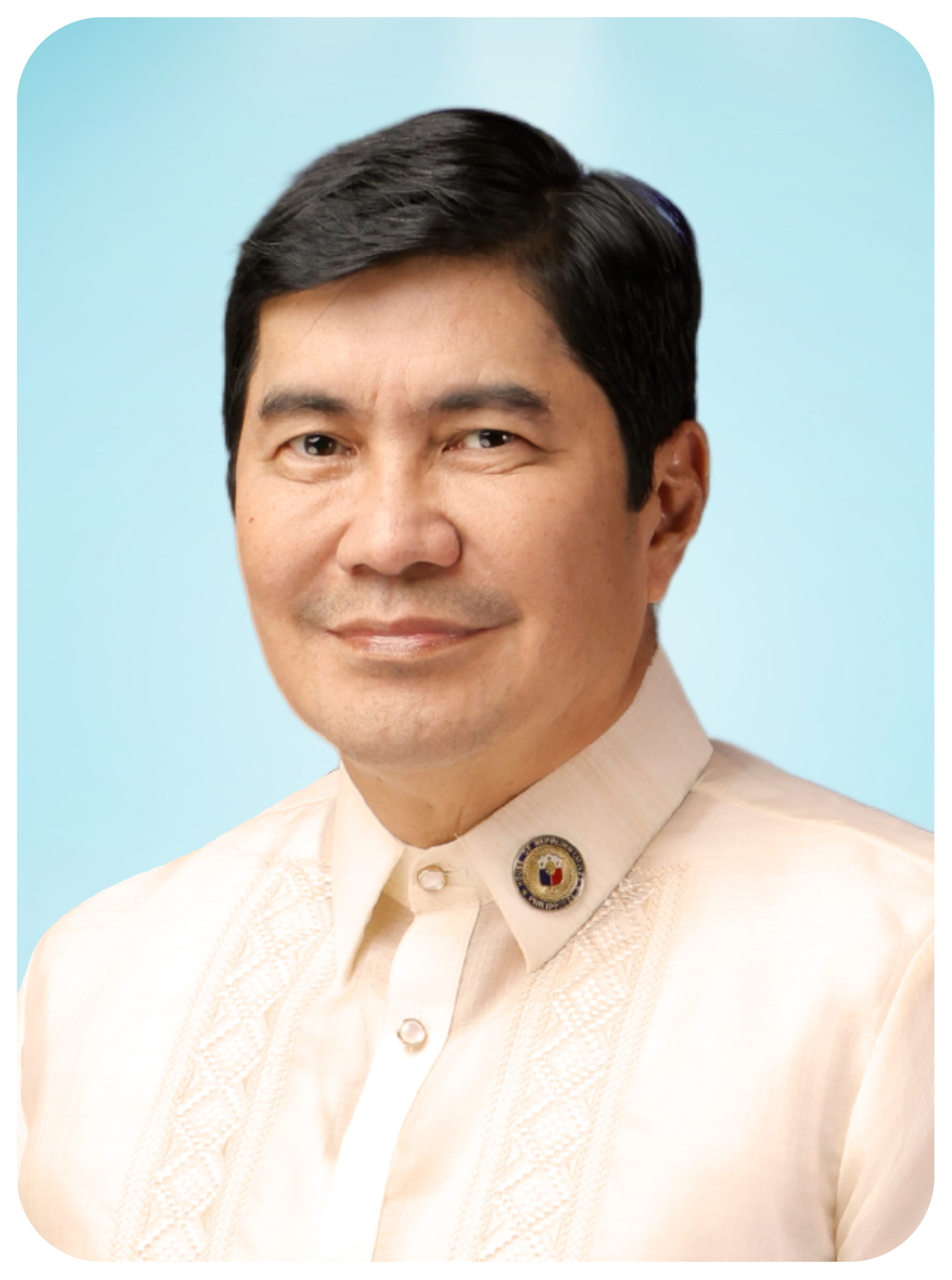
Official portrait, 2023

On May 30, 2023, Tulfo took oath as a representative of ACT-CIS Partylist, a week after a disqualification case against him was junked by the Commission on Elections. On July 20, 2023, Comelec issued a certificate of proclamation to Tulfo, naming him as the third nominee of ACT-CIS, replacing Jeffrey Soriano, who had resigned in February 2023. Tulfo took oath once again as a partylist representative on July 31, 2023, and was named as a House Deputy Majority Leader on August 9, 2023.

=== Senate of the Philippines (2025–present) ===
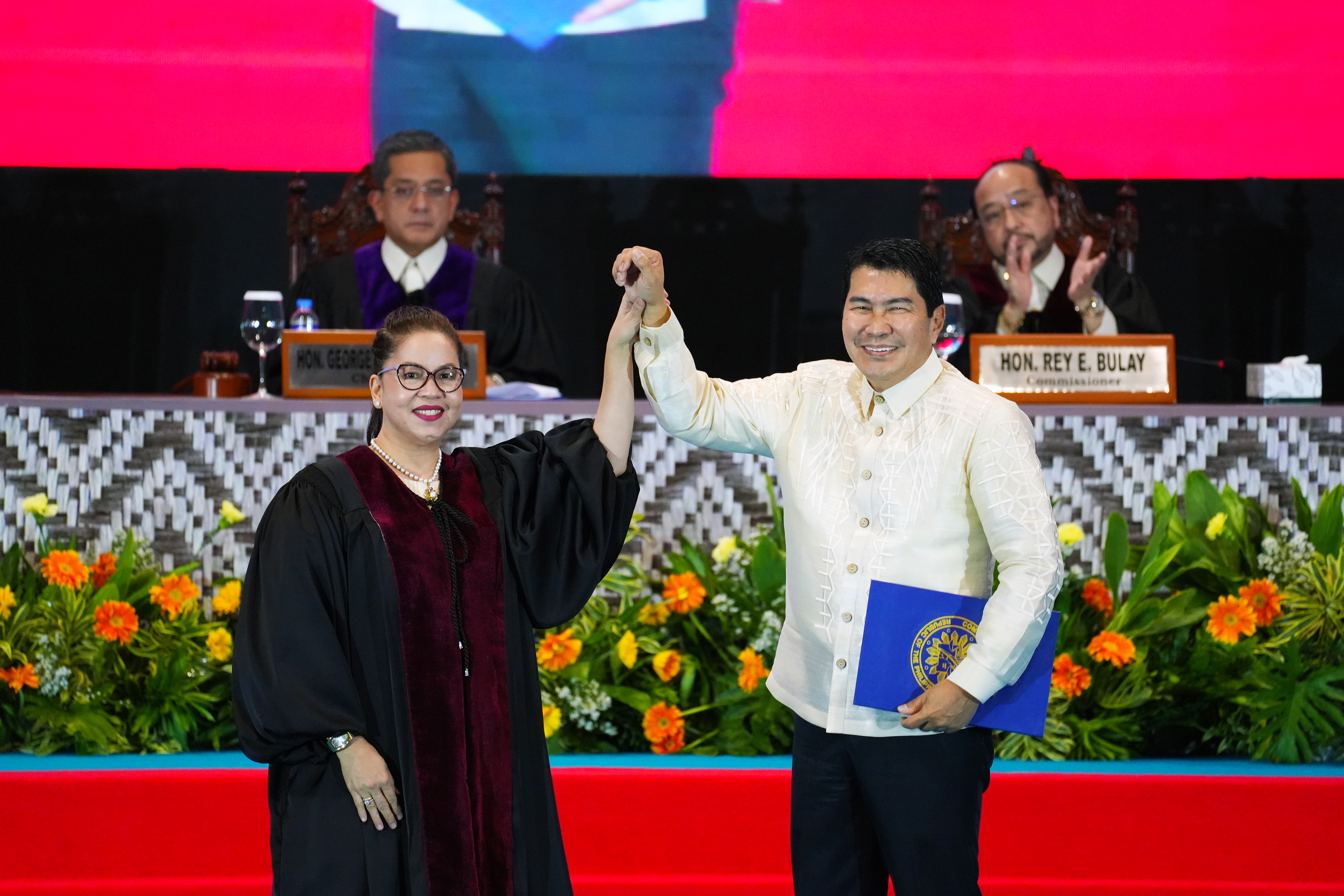
Tulfo being proclaimed as a senator-elect on May 17, 2025

On September 26, 2024, Tulfo was officially introduced as part of Alyansa para sa Bagong Pilipinas senatorial slate for the 2025 Senate election. Tulfo later filed his candidacy to run for senator on October 6, 2024. He was elected and placed fourth.

During the 20th Congress of the Philippines, Tulfo was named chairperson of the Senate committees on Games and Amusement and Social Justice, Welfare and Rural Development, as well as the vice chairperson of the Senate Committee on Foreign Relations and the Senate Blue Ribbon Committee. He later became the acting chairperson of the Blue Ribbon Committee between the resignation of Panfilo Lacson as its chairperson on October 5, 2025, and Lacson's reinstatement on November 11, 2025. On May 11, 2026, Tulfo joined the minority bloc aligned with ousted Senate President Tito Sotto following a chamber reorganization triggered by the election of Alan Peter Cayetano as Senate President. On June 3, Tulfo was named as the new chairperson of the Senate Blue Ribbon Committee following Win Gatchalian's election as Senate President pro tempore and acting Senate President; the chairmanship was disputed with Senator Pia Cayetano until June 16.

==== Flood control projects scandal ====
During the Blue Ribbon Committee hearing on June 4, 2026, several individuals presented by 18 ex-Marines alleged that they had delivered cash-filled suitcases to a number of politicians, including Tulfo. One of the former Marine Bernard Gumban claimed he personally participated in two deliveries allegedly intended for Tulfo. The first delivery involved two suitcases, one small and one medium-sized, while the second involved six suitcases of varying sizes. He stated that deliveries were made to a residence in Greenhills.

Senator Erwin Tulfo made his "bend the law" remark on September 23, 2025, during a Senate Blue Ribbon Committee hearing on anomalous flood-control projects. Frustrated by legal technicalities during the debate, Tulfo stated, "Hindi po batas ang pinag uusapan, wala po tayo pakialam sa batas na 'yan, sometimes you have to bend the law!"

During a press conference at the Doublegem EDSA Garden Events Place in Mandaluyong on June 16, 2026, two ex-bodyguards of former Ako Bicol Representative Zaldy Co accused Tulfo of receiving cash kickbacks from an alleged flood control scam. The event was originally billed as a Senate Blue Ribbon Committee hearing by the bloc of then-disputed Senate President Alan Peter Cayetano but was cancelled as no senators attended the event. On July 8, 2026, Tulfo filed grave oral defamation complaints with the Mandaluyong City Prosecutor's Office against former Anakalusugan Representative Mike Defensor, two of the former bodyguards of the scrutinized former Ako Bicol Representative Zaldy Co, their lawyer Levito Baligod, Quezon City Councilor Ranulfo Ludovica, and lawyer Virgilio Garcia. He denied the accusations, citing a lack of jurisdiction over infrastructure projects, and alleged that such press conference was unauthorized and spearheaded by Defensor and Baligod.

== Controversies ==
=== Libel cases and on-air controversies ===
In 2000, Tulfo was convicted of four counts of libel in Pasay for a series of articles he wrote for the tabloid Remate in 1999 that accuse Bureau of Customs lawyer Carlos So as an "extortionist... and a smuggler". They were ordered to pay ₱2.8 million in damages to So. In 2008, the Supreme Court modified the Pasay Regional Trial Court's four-year imprisonment sentence, replacing the prison term with a fine of ₱6,000 per libel count for each respondent, with subsidiary imprisonment ordered only in the instance of insolvency.

In January 2007, Tulfo and his brothers Ramon and Erwin, each posted bail after a Quezon City Regional Trial Court judge issued warrants for their arrests following a libel complaint by then-First Gentleman Mike Arroyo. The brothers had previously accused Arroyo of using his influence to force the government-sequestered station RPN to cancel their investigative news program Isumbong Mo! (Tulfo Brothers). In July 2007, the libel case against the brothers was dismissed.

In 2008, Tulfo was found guilty by the Supreme Court of the Philippines of four counts of libel and was sentenced to pay a fine of ₱6,000 for each count and, along with his co-accused, ₱1,000,000 to the complainant as moral damages. The cases stemmed from multiple articles he wrote and published in the tabloid Remate which accused a Bureau of Customs official of being "an extortionist, a corrupt public official, smuggler and having illegally acquired wealth".

During the aftermath of the 2010 Manila hostage crisis, Tulfo was severely criticized for his on-air phone interview with hostage-taker Rolando Mendoza which was said to have escalated the incident leading to the deaths of eight hostages.

In July 2014, Tulfo posted bail for an arrest warrant issued by the Quezon City Regional Trial Court after Senior Police Officer III Abubakhar Manlangit filed a libel case against him and his brother Raffy. The policeman, who appeared in a November 2011 episode of T3, also filed an MTRCB complaint against the brothers after being called a "thief" on air, which contributed to a 20-day suspension of the program.

On May 31, 2019, Tulfo made an on-air tirade against Social Welfare Secretary and retired Army Commanding General Rolando Bautista for refusing to interview with him. A few days later, thousands signed a petition demanding Tulfo to apologize. The Philippine Military Academy Alumni Association condemned Tulfo's remarks against the former Philippine Army chief. Tulfo has apologized to Bautista for his remarks.

In 2024, the Court of Appeals dismissed GMA Network's petition for review on the alleged 'stolen video' libel case against Tulfo involving the 2004 kidnapping of Angelo dela Cruz.

=== Bitag Media controversy ===
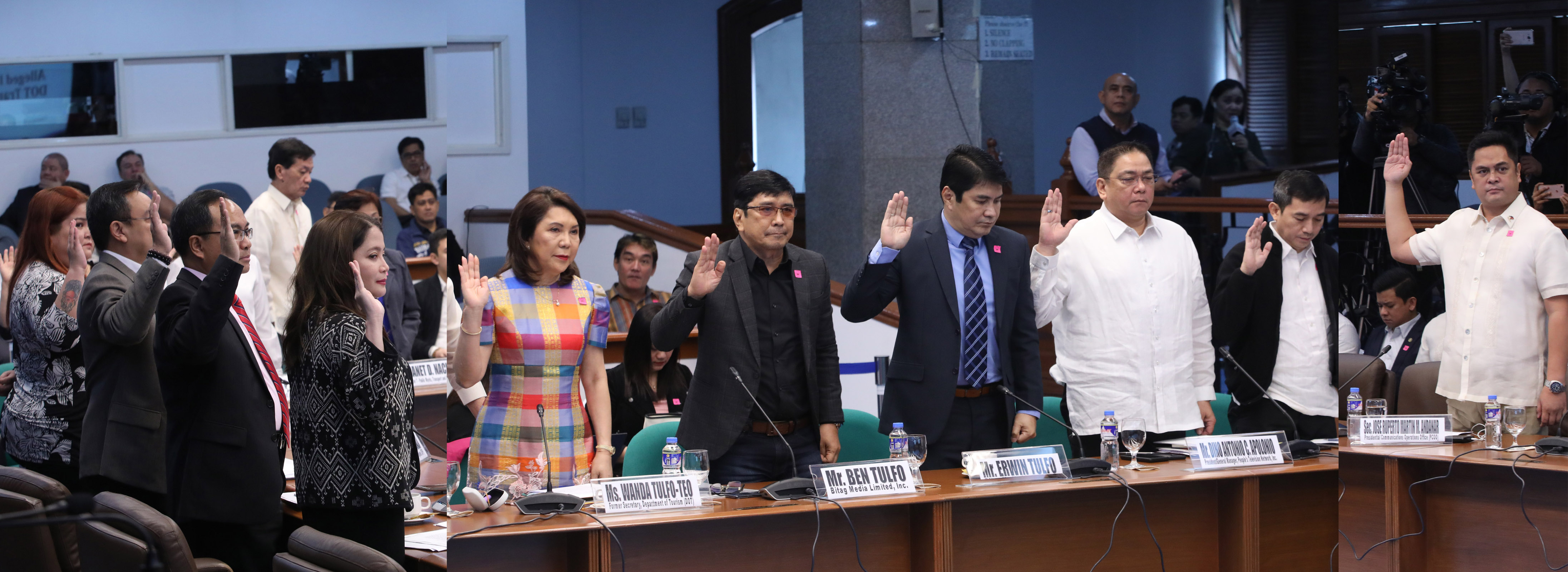
Senate inquiry on the ₱60-million corruption scandal of Wanda Tulfo Teo and her brothers Ben Tulfo and Erwin Tulfo.

In 2018, it was revealed by the Commission on Audit that the Department of Tourism (DOT), then headed by Tulfo's sister Wanda, paid around ₱60 million to Bitag Media Unlimited Inc., a media outfit headed by their brother Ben, to place tourism ads on Kilos Pronto, a blocktimer show on PTV hosted by Tulfo. The transactions were not supported with proper documents such as a memorandum of agreement or contract. On May 8, Wanda Tulfo Teo resigned from her post. She stressed that she did not know that her brothers were running the television show and that it was a government-to-government contract between the tourism department and People's Television Network. The Tulfo brothers afterwards promised that they will return the ₱60 million. However, on June 17, 2018, it was revealed that they have not yet returned the money they received from the DOT. In August 2018, then-Senator Antonio Trillanes IV declared that he will press plunder charges against the Tulfo siblings.

=== Citizenship dispute ===
In 2022, Tulfo's citizenship was disputed when he was appointed Secretary of Social Welfare and Development by then-President-elect Bongbong Marcos in May 2022. In December, the Commission on Appointments bypassed his appointment for the second time due to his American citizenship, which he had admitted to have from 1986 to renouncing it in early 2022, and his conviction on four counts of libel.

== Other ventures ==
Tulfo is also a franchisee and endorser of Siomai King, a food cart business selling Philippine siomai.

== Personal life ==
Tulfo met newscaster Karen Padilla at ABS-CBN in the 1990s, whom he later married. They have two daughters: Erika (born January 2004) and Erin.

In 2022, Tulfo admitted to having a total of ten children with four women. In October 2024, Tulfo listed Rizalina Aquino as his wife in his certificate of candidacy for senator in the 2025 elections.

== Electoral history ==
Electoral history of Erwin Tulfo
Year	Office	Party	Votes received				Result
Year	Office	Party	Total	%	P.	Swing	Result
2022	Representative (Party-list)	ACT-CIS	2,111,091	5.80%	1st	—N/a	Won
2025	Senator of the Philippines	Lakas	17,118,881	29.85%	4th	—N/a	Won

== Filmography ==
=== Television ===
Year	Title	Character
1987–1992	PTV Weekend Report	News anchor
1987–1995	Pangunahing Balita	News anchor
1995–1996	Magandang Umaga Po	Host
1996–2006	Alas Singko y Medya/Magandang Umaga Bayan/Magandang Umaga, Pilipinas	Host
1996–2004	ABS-CBN Weekend News	News anchor
1995–1999	Hoy Gising!	Himself
1999–2000	Mission–X	Host
2000–2002	Pangako Sa 'Yo	Himself (Cameo)
2001–2005	Magandang Gabi, Bayan	Host
2003–2005	Private I.	Host
2004–2005	TV Patrol Sabado/Linggo (now TV Patrol Weekend)	News anchor
2004–2005	ABS-CBN Insider	News anchor
2005–2006	Isumbong Mo: Tulfo Brothers	Himself
2006–2007	RPN NewsWatch Aksyon Balita	News anchor
2007–2009	Bitag	Co-host
2010–2017	Aksyon	News anchor
2010–2012	Tutok Tulfo	Host
2010–2011	Sapul sa Singko	Host/Anchor
2011–2016	T3: Alliance	Host
2013–2014	Good Morning Club	Host/Anchor
2014–2016	Yaman ng Bayan	Host
2017–2018	Kilos Pronto	Co-host
2017–2018	PTV News	News anchor
2020–2022	Ulat Bayan	News anchor
2025	Arangkada Balita	News anchor

== Radio ==
Year	Title
2010–2018; 2023–2025	Punto Asintado with Aljo Bendijo
2018–2022	Tutok Erwin Tulfo
2006–2010	RMN News Nationwide
2023	Erwin Tulfo On-Air with Niña Corpuz

== Awards ==
PMPC Star Awards for Television

- Best Male Newscaster (2014, 2015 and 2016)

Inding-Indie Short Film Festival

- Asian Best Broadcasters Award (2015)
- Most Trusted Media Personalities for Radio and Television Award (2016)

Political offices
Preceded by Rolando Joselito Bautista	Secretary of Social Welfare and Development; 2022	Succeeded by Edu Punay as OIC
