= Rex Book Store =

Philippine educational book publisher

- Logo used since 2021
- Industry: Bookstore and publisher
- Founded: 1950
- Headquarters: REX Knowledge Center, 109 Senator M. Cuenco Sr., Quezon City, Philippines; 856 Nicanor Reyes St, Sampaloc, Manila, Philippines
- Key people: Dominador "Jimmy" Buhain
- Website: www.rex.com.ph

Rex Book Store, Inc. (RBSI), stylized REX Book Store, is an educational book publisher and bookstore chain in the Philippines. It was incorporated in 1950 and established branches in the provincial cities of Angeles City, Bacolod, Baguio, Basco, Cabanatuan, Cagayan de Oro, Calapan, Cebu City, Dasmariñas, Davao City, General Santos, Iloilo City, Legazpi, Naga, Tacloban, Tuguegarao, Urdaneta, and Zamboanga City.

Rex Bookstore is one of the pioneers in the educational publishing industry in the Philippines. It has published books for all levels, from basic education, high school, tertiary, law, and post-collegiate.

== History ==
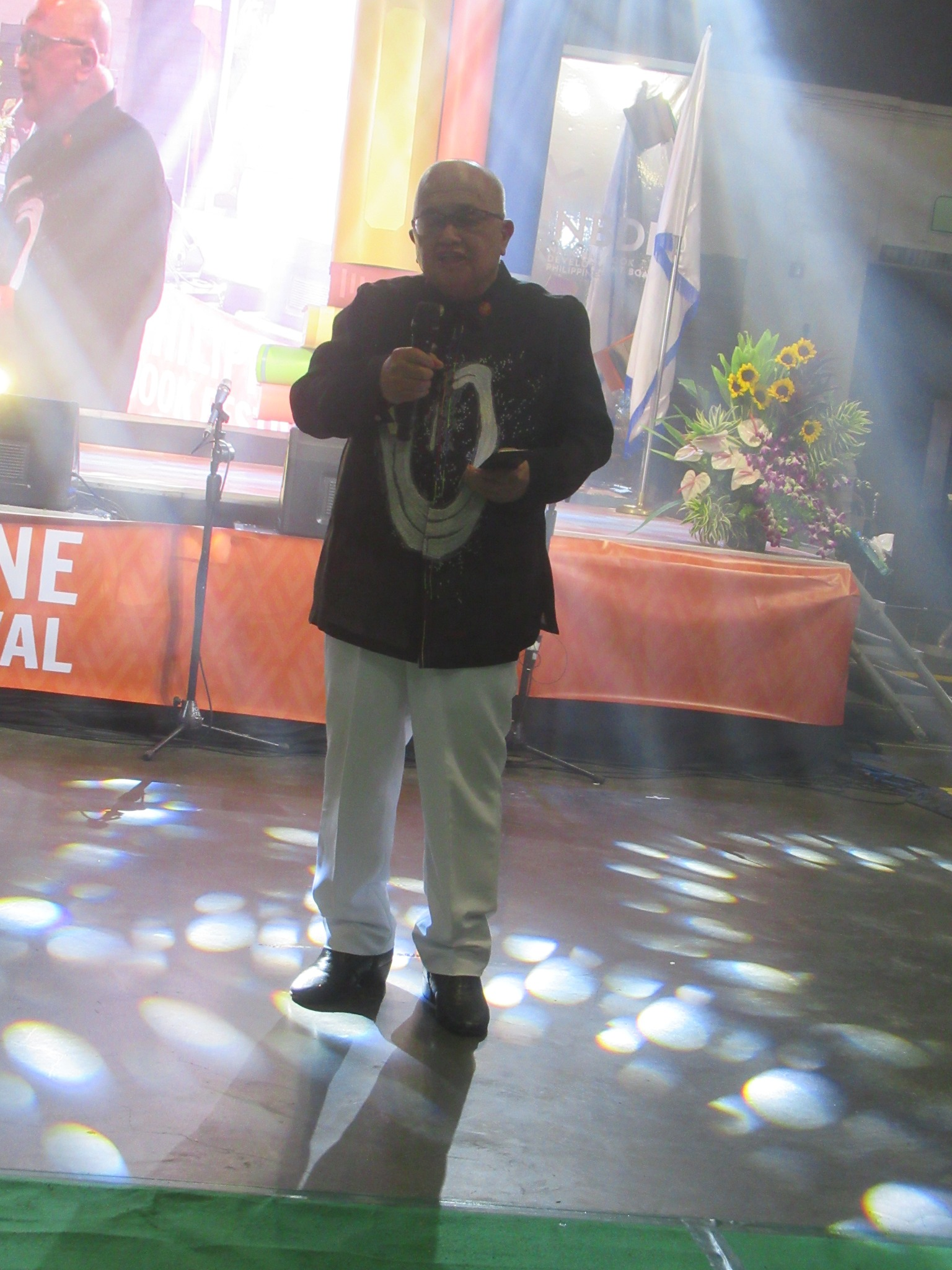
Dominador Buhain

Rex Bookstore was founded by Jovita Dunca-Buhain and Juanito Fontelera in the 1950s.

== Products ==
RBSI publishes Teacher's Manuals, along with interactive materials like activity posters, charts, and other paper-based materials. The company is also involved in digital publishing and has ventured into developing e-books.

== See also ==
- Literacy in the Philippines
- Philippine Literature
