= DiVA (open archive) =

Swedish open digital publication repository

DiVA (short from Digitala Vetenskapliga Arkivet, "Digital Scientific Archive") and is a digital repository that enables Swedish universities, university colleges, public authorities, research institutes and museums to collect and make publications openly available.

DiVA is Sweden's most used system for registration and dissemination of research publication data with its almost 50 affiliated organizations. When research documents are published in DiVA they can be searched from the joint search tool DiVA portal and become also accessible and searchable in a large number of other national and international search tools, such as OpenAire, Swepub, Libris, Google Scholar, WorldCat and BASE. All posts in DiVA are provided with a permanent identifier in the form of a URN:NBN, a solution provided by the National Library of Sweden. This means that all publications are provided with stable links and can be accessed via the national reference service. URN stands for Uniform Resource Name and NBN for National Bibliography Number.

Web statistics from DiVA show high usage with about 50 million downloads per year, which corresponds to over 130,000 per day and an average of 95 downloads per minute.

DiVA is developed in collaboration between all the associated members as a consortium. DiVA members make joint decisions on budgets, strategies and development goals. Management and system development are financed through set fees. The system is owned by Uppsala University and the responsibility for its management and support lies with Uppsala University Library. Everyone interested can follow DiVAs development via the DiVA wiki pages or DiVAs blog (in Swedish).

== Functionality ==
DiVA enables researchers and other employees of the participating organizations to store, administer and publish information about their publications in one system. Data collection can be done in different ways from both internal and external sources and publications can be entered manually or imported from sources such as Scopus, Web of Science, arXiV and Mendeley. Each member organization owns and is responsible for the content of its own database and has a local search interface in addition to the common one.

The core functionality of DiVA is the registration and digital dissemination of metadata and full texts for publications. There are about twenty different publication types in DiVA that are adapted to their specific content, e.g. article in journal, dissertation, book, chapter in book, conference paper, artistic output, report and student essays. It is also possible to add project information to DiVA, either by importing project records from the Swedish Research Council's database SweCris or by manually adding information about local projects. In DiVA, a link can also be made between the project and its publications. The function for adding project information to DiVA is optional and must be activated by the member. It is also possible to upload and publish full texts and other files in a variety of formats together with the metadata.

Information from DiVA can be displayed in lists of publications on web pages and disseminated to other databases and search engines, e.g. Libris and SwePub. In addition to DiVA being a broad platform for open access to publications, it is also a source of data for statistics and evaluations.

== History ==
The first initiative for DiVA was taken in 1998, when the Vice-Chancellor of Uppsala University commissioned a study with the aim to prepare proposals for overall regulations and working methods for the University's scholarly publication on www. The first version of DiVA was launched three years later. In the beginning the main focus was to publish doctoral theses and to implement a workflow for posting the theses. The DiVA collaboration started in 2003 with 5 members, and the DiVA consortium was founded.

The requirement for bibliometrics and evaluation of Swedish research led to new demands for publication databases. Therefore, DiVA was further developed and a completely new version was launched in 2008. With the new version of Diva, the system became not only a platform for full-text publications but also an institutional repository and bibliographic database for all kinds of research publications. With the new version of DiVA, the number of members has gradually increased, also with new types of organizations such as research institutes, public authorities and museums. Recently, new work has begun to develop DiVA into a new in-house developed platform Cora.
