= Daily Info (TV program) =

Defunct morning newscast of People's Television Network

- Directed by: Boy Osoyos; John Cruz
- Presented by: Audrey Gorriceta; Trixie Jaafar
- Opening theme: "A.M. Attitudes" by Universal Production Music
- Country of origin: Philippines
- Original language: Filipino

Production
- Executive producer: Angie Arguelles
- Producers: Angie Arguelles (OIC, News Division)
- Production locations: PTV Studio A, PIA-PTV Government Center, Quezon City
- Camera setup: Multi-camera setup
- Running time: 30 minutes (2017–20)

Original release
- Network: People's Television Network
- Release: May 8, 2017 – July 31, 2020

Related
- Bagong Pilipinas; Sentro Balita; Ulat Bayan

Daily Info is a Philippine television news broadcasting show broadcast by PTV. Originally anchored by Audrey Gorriceta and Diane Querrer. It aired from May 8, 2017, to July 31, 2020, replacing Good Morning Pilipinas and was replaced by Rise and Shine Pilipinas. Gorriceta and Trixie Jaafar serve as the final anchors.

== Anchors ==
- Audrey Gorriceta (2017, 2018–20)
- Trixie Jaafar (main anchor, 2020, PTV InfoWeather, 2017–20)

== Former anchors ==
- Aljo Bendijo (2017–18)
- Catherine Vital (2017–18)
- Diane Querrer (2017, 2018–20)

== Reporters ==
- Bea Bernardo
- Louisa Erispe
- Mark Fetalco
- Allan Francisco
- Deo De Guzman
- Bernard Jaudian
- Patrick De Jesus
- Mica Ella Joson
- Ryan Lesigues
- Mela Lesmoras
- Daniel Manalastas
- Kenneth Paciente
- Cleizl Pardilla
- Sandra Samala
- Eunice Samonte
- Stephanie Sevillano
- Naomi Tiburcio
- Karen Villanda

== See also ==
- List of programs broadcast by People's Television Network
- Bagong Pilipinas
- RadyoBisyon
