= PTV News (TV program) =

Defunct television newscast of People's Television Network

- Created by: PTV
- Directed by: John Cruz; Leo Docto; Boy Osoyos
- Presented by: Aljo Bendijo; Diane Querrer; Alex Santos
- Narrated by: Alex Santos (2018–20); Aljo Bendijo (2020)
- Opening theme: "Midnight Report Alt" by Rick Rhodes and Michael Sinclair, SmartSound Music
- Country of origin: Philippines
- Original languages: English (1995–97, 2016–17); Filipino (2016–17, 2017–20)

Production
- Executive producer: KC Santos Juan (Weekday Edition)
- Producers: Angie Arguelles (OIC, News Division)
- Production locations: PTV 4 Studio A, Quezon City
- Camera setup: Multicamera setup
- Running time: 60 minutes

Original release
- Network: PTV
- Release: October 2, 1995 – 1997
- Release: July 11, 2016 – July 9, 2017
- Release: September 18, 2017 – September 4, 2020

Related
- Bagong Pilipinas; Daily Info

PTV News is a Philippine television news program broadcast by PTV. Originally anchored by Erik Espina, Issa Rodriguez, Chiqui Roa-Puno, and Daniel Razon, it aired from October 2, 1995, to 1997, replacing News on 4, and was itself replaced by The Final Report.

The newscast returned from July 11, 2016, to July 9, 2017, replacing News @ 1, News @ 6, NewsLife, News @ 6 Saturday Edition, and The Weekend News, and was in turn replaced by Sentro Balita, Ulat Bayan, Ulat Bayan Weekend, and PTV News Headlines. Aljo Bendijo, Diane Querrer, and Alex Santos served as the final anchors.

The newscast returned again as a weekday primetime program from September 18, 2017, to September 4, 2020, replacing Ulat Bayan, and was later replaced by Ulat Bayan once more. The hour-long program aired nationally on PTV-4 and was simulcast on the government radio network Radyo Pilipinas every Monday through Friday at 6:00 pm.

== History ==
PTV News, initially known as PTV News Nationwide, was the flagship late-night English-language newscast of PTV. It premiered on October 2, 1995, replacing News on 4, and was originally anchored by Erik Espina, Issa Rodriguez, and Chiqui Roa-Puno. This first incarnation of PTV News was cancelled in 1997 and replaced by The Final Report, which ran until 1998.

The network-produced afternoon edition (1:00 to 2:00 pm) was anchored by Audrey Gorriceta (who has now been replaced by Alex Santos) and Princess Habibah Sarip-Paudac. The primetime edition (6:00 to 7:00 pm) was anchored by Kathy San Gabriel, Aljo Bendijo, and Ria Fernandez. The late-night edition (9:15 to 10:00 pm) was anchored by Catherine Vital, Richmond Cruz, and Charms Espina. The weekend editions (6:00 to 7:00 pm) were anchored by Rocky Ignacio and Ralph Obina on Saturdays, and by Joseph Parafina, Diane Querrer, and Ria Fernandez on Sundays.

The 2016–17 run marked only the second time that PTV's newscasts were under a single brand. The first was Teledyaryo, which aired from July 16, 2001, to June 29, 2012. The programming changes followed the start of the Duterte administration. The relaunched PTV News took over the timeslots of News @ 1, News @ 6, NewsLife and The Weekend News.

PTV News was replaced on July 10, 2017, by three newly revamped newscasts: Sentro Balita (afternoon), Ulat Bayan (weekday and weekend evenings), and PTV News Headlines (late-night), shortly after the channel's rebranding on June 28, 2017.

=== 2017–2018: Tulfo and Querrer tandem ===
About two months later, on September 18, PTV News returned as PTV's premier early-evening newscast with two new anchors: Erwin Tulfo, who had just resigned from TV5, Radyo5 92.3 News FM, and AksyonTV, and Diane Querrer. Ulat Bayan then became PTV's weekend newscast.

Following a controversy involving Erwin Tulfo, his brother Ben, the Department of Tourism, and PTV-4, Erwin was removed from the newscast. A rotating trio of anchors, Audrey Gorriceta, Ralph Obina, and Aljo Bendijo, filled in for his slot until June 1, 2018.

=== 2018–2020: Santos and Vital, later Bendijo Querrer and Santos era ===
Alex Santos and Catherine Vital became the new anchors of PTV News on June 4, 2018, formally replacing Tulfo and Querrer; Querrer was reassigned, returning to Daily Info, alongside Audrey Gorriceta. A new headline sequence and title card were introduced on July 16, 2018, soon after PTV's relaunch. On March 18, 2020, Vital left the newscast, leaving Santos as the sole anchor, around the same time Joee Guilas and Rocky Ignacio took over Ulat Bayan's Saturday edition.

On May 11, 2020, Aljo Bendijo and Diane Querrer returned as the weeknight anchors of PTV News, replacing Vital, who transferred to the late-night newscast of PTV News Headlines to rejoin Santos. PTV News aired its final broadcast on September 4, 2020, making way for Ulat Bayan on September 7, 2020. The weekday morning program Rise and Shine Pilipinas launched the same day, hosted by Bendijo, Querrer, and Gab Bayan; the afternoon edition newscast Sentro Balita with Gani Oro and Angelique Lazo; PTV Balita Ngayon; and the late-night newscast PTV News Tonight, with Joee Guilas, Charms Espina, and Catherine Vital.

=== PTV News Mindanao ===
As part of the expansion of PTV's local programming, a 45-minute regional newscast called PTV News Mindanao launched on October 16, 2017, airing on PTV Davao Channel 11. It is anchored by Jay Lagang and Vina Araneta-Pilapil.

== Anchors ==
Main editions

- Aljo Bendijo (2020)
- Diane Querrer (2017–18, 2020)
- Alex Santos (2018–20)

=== Fill-in anchors ===
- Audrey Gorriceta

=== Former anchors ===
Main editions

- Erik Espina (1995–97)
- Chiqui Roa-Puno (1995–97)
- Issa Rodriguez (1995-97)
- Daniel Razon (substitute anchor: 1995–97)
- Erwin Tulfo (2017–18)
- Catherine Vital (2018–20)

Afternoon editions

- Kirby Cristobal (2016)
- Audrey Gorriceta (2016–17)
- Princess Habibah Sarip-Paudac (2016–17)
- Alex Santos (2017)

Evening editions

- Aljo Bendijo (2016–17)
- Kathy San Gabriel (Evening edition) (2016–17)
- Ria Fernandez (2016–17)

English editions

- Catherine Vital (2016–17)
- Charms Espina (2016–17)
- Richmond Cruz (2016–17)

Saturday editions

- Rocky Ignacio (2016–17)
- Ralph Obina (2016–17)
- Ria Fernandez (2016–17)
- Joseph Parafina (2016–17)
- Jorge Bandola (2016)
- Waywaya Macalma (2016)

Sunday editions

- Diane Querrer (2016–17)
- Joseph Parafina (2016–17)
- Jorge Bandola (2016)
- Waywaya Macalma (2016)

== Segments ==
Final Current Segments

- PTV InfoWeather

Final Former Segments

- Balitang Police/Law & Order
- Ulat Malacañang/View From The Palace
- GloBalita/One Global Village
- Balitang Pambansa/The Nation In Review
- Balitang Panlalawigan/The CountrySide
- Kalakalan/Business On The Move
- PTV Sports (2017)
- Ang Linya ng Pagbabago (8888 Hotline Presidential Action Center)
- Digong Hotline 8888
- Police Report
- Inside Showbiz
- PTV Traffic Center
- PAGASA-DOST Weather Update

Final Former segment hosts

- Xiao Chua (Xiao Time segment, 2016–2017)
- Atty. JJ Jimeno-Atienza (Bisig ng Batas segment, 2016–2017)
- Angel Atienza (PTV Sports) (2017)
- Meg Siozon (PTV Sports) (2017)
- Wheng Hidalgo (Ang Linya ng Pagbabago) (2016–2017)
- Salvador Panelo (Ang Linya ng Pagbabago) (2016–2017)
- Ice Martinez-Pajarillo (PTV InfoWeather) (2016–2019)
- Miguel Cruzada (Traffic Watch) (2018–2019)

== See also ==
- List of programs broadcast by People's Television Network
