= Bagong Pilipinas (TV program) =

Defunct morning magazine show of People's Television Network

- Genre: News program Magazine
- Directed by: Jose Chito Cabatuando; Carby Salvador
- Presented by: Various
- Country of origin: Philippines
- Original language: Filipino

Production
- Executive producers: Rosemarie Malansang; Maria Besi Cruz-Valdes; Regine Celestre; Richard Noblejas
- Producer: People's Television Network Program Production Services
- Production locations: PTV Studio A, Broadcast Complex, Visayas Avenue, Barangay Vasra, Diliman, Quezon City
- Camera setup: Multiple-camera setup
- Running time: 45-60 minutes (2017–20); 30 minutes (2020)

Original release
- Network: People's Television Network
- Release: May 17, 2017 – July 31, 2020

Bagong Pilipinas (transl. New Philippines) was a morning magazine show aired on PTV, which was aired from May 17, 2017, to July 31, 2020, replacing Good Morning Pilipinas and was replaced by Rise and Shine Pilipinas. The show airs from Mondays to Fridays at 7:00 AM to 8:00 AM. (PHT) and Afternoon Edition from Mondays to Wednesdays from 2:00 PM to 2:30 PM on PTV. It was premiered on May 17, 2017.

Although Bagong Pilipinas is a then-new program, some of the segments from Good Morning Pilipinas were absorbed to the program.

On July 31, 2020, as part of PTV's programming revamp under the leadership of PTV Network General Manager, Kat de Castro, Bagong Pilipinas aired their last broadcast to make way for Rise and Shine Pilipinas!

== Final hosts ==
- Jules Guiang
- Dianne Medina
- Karla Paderna
- Diane Querrer
- Gab Bayan
- Alfonso "Fifi" Delos Santos
- Chi Atienza-Valdepenas
- Karlo Nograles

=== Final segment hosts ===
- Carby Salvador
- Pamela Ablola
- Jake Napoles
- Josanna Zosimo
- Dr. Emmylou Eclipse
- Emman Franc

=== Former hosts and segment hosts ===
- Greco Belgica
- Congressman John Bertiz
- Hans Horne
- Ann Jun Magnaye
- Bong Magpayo

=== Final segments ===
- Artsy Craftsy
- ASEAN TV
- Best Buys
- Dermaesthetique
- Eat's Fun
- EntrePinoy
- FAB: Fashion and Beauty
- Fifi of Fortune
- Fifirazzi
- FriDates with Carby
- Health is Wealth
- It's A Sign
- Juan Overseas
- Just 4 Kids
- Lifestyle
- Live Performance
- Lutong Bahay
- News & Views
- On The Spot (Interview Portion)
- Passport on Wheels
- Pop Culture
- School Hopping
- Special Feature
- Teen Patrol
- Traffic Update
- Trip Ticket
- WWW: Whatever, Whenever, Wherever (Features)

== See also ==
- List of programs broadcast by People's Television Network
- Good Morning Pilipinas
