= NewsLife =

Defunct nightly newscast of People's Television Network

- Created by: PTV
- Directed by: Boy Osoyos
- Presented by: Catherine Vital; Richmond Cruz; Charmaine Espina
- Country of origin: Philippines
- Original language: English
- No. of episodes: n/a (airs daily)

Production
- Executive producer: Freddie Abando
- Production locations: PTV Studio A, PIA-PTV Government Center, Quezon City
- Running time: 75 minutes

Original release
- Network: People's Television Network
- Release: July 2, 2012 – July 8, 2016

Related
- Teledyaryo; PTV News; RadyoBisyon; Good Morning Pilipinas; News @ 1; News @ 6; The Weekend News

NewsLife is the flagship English language newscast of PTV, originally anchored by Angel Movido, Robert Tan, and Isabella Cantu. It premiered on July 2, 2012 replacing Teledyaryo: Final Edition and was replaced by PTV News.

Charms Espina, Catherine Vital, Richmond Cruz served as the final anchors when the program aired their last broadcast on July 8, 2016, making way for the return of PTV News in its time slot.

Title card from 2012 to 2013

== Former anchors ==
- Cathy Untalan
- Richmond Cruz
- Charms Espina
- Angel Movido
- Robert Tan
- Isabella Cantu
- Edmund Rosales
- Bianca Saldua

== See also ==
- List of programs broadcast by People's Television Network
