= 28th PMPC Star Awards for Television =

2014 Philippine television awards

- Date: November 23, 2014; November 30, 2014 (Delayed Telecast)
- Location: Solaire Resort and Casino Grand Ballroom, Parañaque
- Hosted by: Iza Calzado; Kim Chiu; Enchong Dee; Piolo Pascual

Television/radio coverage
- Network: ABS-CBN
- Produced by: Airtime Marketing Philippines, Inc.

The 28th PMPC Star Awards for Television (organized by Philippine Movie Press Club headed by President Fernan de Guzman and produced by Airtime Marketing Philippines, Inc. headed by Tessie Celestino-Howard) awarding ceremony was held last November 23, 2014, at the Solaire Resort and Casino Grand Ballroom, Parañaque and will be broadcast on ABS-CBN Channel 2 on November 30, 2014 ("Sunday's Best", 10:45pm). The awards night will be hosted by Iza Calzado, Kim Chiu, Enchong Dee and Piolo Pascual with performances by Maja Salvador, James Reid, Pokwang, and the cast of Bubble Gang; directed by Arnel Natividad.

== Awards ==
These are the nominations list (in alphabetical order) for the 28th Star Awards for Television. The winners are in bold.

Number of Nominees

Network	Total #
ABS-CBN	132
AksyonTV	1
ETC	1
GMA	96
GMA News TV	47
IBC	1
Net 25	13
PTV 4	7
Studio 23	1
TV5	35
UNTV	14

Number of Winners (excluding Special Awards)

Network	Total #
ABS-CBN	32
GMA	12
GMA News TV	6
TV5	5

=== Best TV Station ===
- Winner: **ABS-CBN-2**
- PTV-4
- TV5
- GMA-7
- ETC-9 (now 9TV/CNN Philippines)
- GMA News TV-11
- IBC 13
- Studio 23 (renamed as ABS-CBN Sports+Action)
- Net 25
- UNTV-37
- AksyonTV-41

=== Best Primetime Drama Series ===
- Winner: **Ikaw Lamang (ABS-CBN)**
- Ang Dalawang Mrs. Real (GMA)
- Honesto (ABS-CBN)
- Muling Buksan Ang Puso (ABS-CBN)
- Niño (GMA)
- Sana Bukas pa ang Kahapon (ABS-CBN)
- The Legal Wife (ABS-CBN)

=== Best Daytime Drama Series ===
- Winner: **Be Careful With My Heart (ABS-CBN)**
- Dading (GMA)
- Galema: Anak ni Zuma (ABS-CBN)
- Innamorata (GMA)
- Magkano Ba ang Pag-ibig? (GMA)
- Moon of Desire (ABS-CBN)
- The Half Sisters (GMA)

=== Best Drama Actor ===
- Winner: **Coco Martin Ikaw Lamang (ABS-CBN)**
- Dingdong Dantes Ang Dalawang Mrs. Real (GMA7)
- Enchong Dee Muling Buksan Ang Puso (ABS-CBN)
- Gabby Eigenmann Dading (GMA7)
- Gerald Anderson Bukas Na Lang Kita Mamahalin (ABS-CBN)
- Jericho Rosales The Legal Wife (ABS-CBN)
- Kristofer Martin Kahit Nasaan Ka Man (GMA7)
- Miguel Tanfelix Niño (GMA7)

=== Best Drama Actress ===
- Winner: **Kim Chiu Ikaw Lamang (ABS-CBN)**
- Angel Locsin The Legal Wife (ABS-CBN)
- Bea Alonzo Sana Bukas pa ang Kahapon (ABS-CBN)
- Dawn Zulueta Bukas Na Lang Kita Mamahalin (ABS-CBN)
- Lovi Poe Ang Dalawang Mrs. Real (GMA7)
- Maja Salvador The Legal Wife (ABS-CBN)
- Maricel Soriano Ang Dalawang Mrs. Real (GMA7)

=== Best Drama Supporting Actor ===
- Winner: **John Estrada Ikaw Lamang (ABS-CBN)**
- Christopher de Leon Ikaw Lamang (ABS-CBN)
- Eddie Garcia Honesto (ABS-CBN)
- Jake Cuenca Ikaw Lamang (ABS-CBN)
- Joel Torre Ikaw Lamang (ABS-CBN)
- Ronaldo Valdez Ikaw Lamang (ABS-CBN)
- Tirso Cruz III Ikaw Lamang (ABS-CBN)

=== Best Drama Supporting Actress ===
- Winner: **KC Concepcion Ikaw Lamang (ABS-CBN)**
- Amy Austria Ikaw Lamang (ABS-CBN)
- Angel Aquino Ikaw Lamang (ABS-CBN)
- Cherie Gil Muling Buksan ang Puso (ABS-CBN)
- Cherry Pie Picache Ikaw Lamang (ABS-CBN)
- Julia Montes Ikaw Lamang (ABS-CBN)
- Manilyn Reynes Got to Believe (ABS-CBN)

=== Best Drama Anthology ===
- Winner: **Magpakailanman (GMA7)**
- Ipaglaban Mo! (ABS-CBN)
- Maynila (GMA7)
- Wagas (GMA News TV)

=== Best Single Performance by an Actor ===
- Winners (Tied):**Arjo Atayde Maalaala Mo Kaya episode: "Dos Por Dos" (ABS-CBN)**, and **Jose Manalo Eat Bulaga! Lenten special: "Hulog ng Langit" (GMA7)**
- Alden Richards Magpakailanman episode: "Kawalan ng Karapatan: The Dondon Lanuza Story (GMA7)
- Carlo Aquino MMK episode: "Wedding Gown" (ABS-CBN)
- Gabby Eigenmann Magpakailanman episode: "My Psychotic Husband" (GMA7)
- Kristoffer Martin Magpakailanman episode: "Siga Noon, Beki na Ngayon" (GMA7)
- Smokey Manaloto Ipaglaban Mo! episode: "Kaya Ba Kitang Itakwil?" (ABS-CBN)
- Zaijan Jaranilla MMK episode: "Karayom" (ABS-CBN)

=== Best Single Performance by an Actress ===
- Winner: **Sunshine Cruz MMK episode: "Karayom" (ABS-CBN)**
- Carmina Villarroel MMK episode: "Sanggol" (ABS-CBN)
- Gina Pareño Magpakailanman episode: "Ang Inang Hindi Malilimutan" (GMA7)
- Irma Adlawan MMK episode: "Mikropono" (ABS-CBN)
- Janice de Belen Ipaglaban Mo! episode: "Ang Lahat ng sa Akin" (ABS-CBN)
- Maricel Soriano Eat Bulaga! Lenten special: "Kulungan Kandungan" (GMA7)
- Nora Aunor Studio 5 Original Movies: "When I Fall In Love" (TV5)
- Yasmien Kurdi Magpakailanman episode: "Nalunod na Pag-Asa: The Cebu Ship Collision" (GMA7)

=== Best Child Performer ===
- Winner: **Raikko Mateo Honesto (ABS-CBN)**
- Andrea Brillantes Annaliza (ABS-CBN)
- David Remo Binoy Henyo (GMA7)
- Jillian Ward My BFF (GMA7)
- Marc Justin Alvarez Ang Dalawang Mrs. Real (GMA7)
- Mona Louise Rey My BFF (GMA7)
- Yogo Singh Maria Mercedes (ABS-CBN)

=== Best New Male TV Personality ===
- Winner: **Manolo Pedrosa MMK episode: "Selfie" (ABS-CBN)**
- Andre Paras The Half Sisters (GMA7)
- John Pol Dimaculangan Walang Tulugan with the Master Showman (GMA7)
- Juan Karlos Labajo MMK episode: "Picture" (ABS-CBN)
- Marco Pingol Wansapanataym presents: "My App Boyfie" (ABS-CBN)
- Prince Villanueva Walang Tulugan with the Master Showman (GMA7)
- Rafa Siguion-Reyna Niño (GMA7)

=== Best New Female TV Personality ===
- Winner: **Lyca Gairanod MMK episode: "Red Envelope" (ABS-CBN)**
- Donnalyn Bartolome SpinNation (TV5)
- Gabbi Garcia My Destiny (GMA7)
- Inah Estrada Wansapanataym presents: Witch-A-Makulit (ABS-CBN)''
- Marina Sasaki Walang Tulugan with the Master Showman (GMA7)
- Yna Uy Walang Tulugan with the Master Showman (GMA7)

=== Best Gag Show ===
- Winner: **Goin' Bulilit (ABS-CBN)**
- Banana Nite (ABS-CBN)
- Banana Split Extra Scoop (ABS-CBN)
- Tropa Mo Ko Unli/Nice Diba? (TV5)
- Wow Mali Pa Rin/Wow Mali: Lakas ng Tama! (TV5)

=== Best Comedy Show ===
- Winner: **Home Sweetie Home (ABS-CBN)**
- Ismol Family (GMA)
- One of the Boys (TV5)
- Pepito Manaloto: Ang Tunay na Kwento (GMA)
- Toda Max (ABS-CBN)
- Vampire Ang Daddy Ko (GMA)

=== Best Comedy Actor ===
- Winner: **Sef Cadayona Bubble Gang (GMA7)**
- Bugoy Cariño Goin' Bulilit (ABS-CBN)
- Clarence Delgado Goin' Bulilit (ABS-CBN)
- Harvey Bautista Goin' Bulilit (ABS-CBN)
- John Lloyd Cruz Home Sweetie Home (ABS-CBN)
- Michael V. Pepito Manaloto: Ang Tunay na Kwento (GMA7)
- Vic Sotto Vampire Ang Daddy Ko (GMA7)

=== Best Comedy Actress ===
- Winner: **Rufa Mae Quinto Bubble Gang (GMA7)**
- Ai-Ai delas Alas Toda Max (ABS-CBN)
- Alex Gonzaga Banana Nite (ABS-CBN)
- Angelica Panganiban Banana Split: Extra Scoop (ABS-CBN)
- Manilyn Reynes Pepito Manaloto: Ang Tunay na Kwento (GMA7)
- Nova Villa Pepito Manaloto: Ang Tunay na Kwento (GMA7)
- Toni Gonzaga Home Sweetie Home (ABS-CBN)

=== Best Variety Show ===
- Winner: **It's Showtime (ABS-CBN)**
- Basta Every Day, Happy! (GMA)
- Wowowillie (TV5)

=== Best Musical Variety Show ===
- Winner: **ASAP 19 (ABS-CBN)**
- Letters and Music (Net 25)
- Marian (GMA)
- Sunday All Stars (GMA)
- The Mega and the Songwriter (TV5)
- This Is My Story, This Is My Song (GMA News TV / Light Network 33)
- Walang Tulugan with the Master Showman (GMA)

=== Best Male TV Host ===
- Winner: **Vice Ganda It's Showtime (ABS-CBN)**
- Billy Crawford It's Showtime (ABS-CBN)
- German Moreno Walang Tulugan with the Master Showman (GMA7)
- Joey de Leon Eat Bulaga! (GMA7)
- Luis Manzano ASAP 19 (ABS-CBN)
- Martin Nievera ASAP 19 (ABS-CBN)
- Vic Sotto for Eat Bulaga! (GMA7)

=== Best Female TV Host ===
- Winner: **Toni Gonzaga ASAP 19 (ABS-CBN)**
- Anne Curtis It's Showtime (ABS-CBN)
- Julia Clarete Eat Bulaga! (GMA7)
- Nikki Gil ASAP 19 (ABS-CBN)
- Pia Guanio Eat Bulaga! (GMA7)
- Sarah Geronimo ASAP 19 (ABS-CBN)
- Sharon Cuneta The Mega and the Songwriter (TV5)

=== Best Public Service Program ===
- Winner: **T3: Enforced (TV5)**
- Bistado (ABS-CBN)
- Imbestigador (GMA)
- My Puhunan (ABS-CBN)
- Red Alert (ABS-CBN)
- S.O.C.O. (Scene of the Crime Operatives) (ABS-CBN)
- Wish Ko Lang (GMA)

=== Best Public Service Program Host ===
- Winner: **Vicky Morales Wish Ko Lang (GMA7)**
- Atom Araullo Red Alert (ABS-CBN)
- Ben Tulfo, Erwin Tulfo and Raffy Tulfo T3: Enforced (TV5)
- Gus Abelgas S.O.C.O. (ABS-CBN)
- Julius Babao Bistado (ABS-CBN)
- Karen Davila My Puhunan (ABS-CBN)
- Mike Enriquez Imbestigador (GMA7)

=== Best Reality Show ===
- Winner: **It Takes Gutz To Be A Gutierrez (TV5)**
- Day Off (GMA News TV)
- I Dare You (ABS-CBN)
- Juan Direction (TV5)

=== Best Reality Show Hosts ===
- Winners: **Bianca Gonzalez, John Prats, Robi Domingo and Toni Gonzaga for Pinoy Big Brother: All In (ABS-CBN)**
- Betong Sumaya, Maey Bautista and Mike "Pekto" Nacua for Day Off (GMA News TV)
- Brian Wilson, Charlie Sutcliffe, Daniel Marsh, Henry Edwards and Michael Mcdonnell for Juan Direction (TV5)
- Deniesse Aguilar, John Prats, Melai Cantiveros and Robi Domingo for I Dare You (ABS-CBN)
- Iza Calzado, Matteo Guidicelli and Robi Domingo for The Biggest Loser Pinoy Edition: Doubles (ABS-CBN)

=== Best Game Show ===
- Winner: **Celebrity Bluff (GMA)**
- Picture! Picture! (GMA)
- Show Up: Ang Bagong Game Show ng Bayan (PTV 4)

=== Best Game Show Host (or Hosts) ===
- Winner: **Judy Ann Santos for Bet on Your Baby (ABS-CBN)**
- Aga Muhlach for Let's Ask Pilipinas (TV5)
- Amy Perez and Roderick Paulate for The Singing Bee (ABS-CBN)
- Eugene Domingo for Celebrity Bluff (GMA)
- Luis Manzano for Kapamilya, Deal or No Deal (ABS-CBN)
- Ryan Agoncillo for Picture! Picture! (GMA)
- Vic Sotto for Who Wants To Be A Millionaire? (TV5)

=== Best Talent Show Program ===
- Winner: **Celebrity Dance Battle (TV5)**
- Anak Ko Yan! (GMA)
- A Song of Praise Music Festival (UNTV)
- Promil Pre-School I-Shine Talent Camp TV (ABS-CBN)

=== Best Talent Show Program Host (or Hosts) ===
- Winners: **Alex Gonzaga and Luis Manzano for The Voice Kids (ABS-CBN)**
- Alex Gonzaga, Robi Domingo and Toni Gonzaga for The Voice of the Philippines (ABS-CBN)
- Dimples Romana, Matteo Guidicelli and Xian Lim for Promil Pre-School I-Shine Talent Camp TV (ABS-CBN)
- Jennylyn Mercado for Anak Ko Yan! (GMA)
- Lucy Torres-Gomez for Celebrity Dance Battle (TV5)
- Richard Reynoso and Toni Rose Gayda for ASOP Music Festival (UNTV)

=== Best Youth Oriented Program ===
- Winner: **Luv U (ABS-CBN)**
- Tribe (Net 25)
- Young Minds Inspired (GMA News TV)

=== Best Educational Program ===
- Winners (Tied): **Born to Be Wild (GMA)**, and **Matanglawin (ABS-CBN)**
- AHA! (GMA)
- Astig!: Sa Sports Walang Tsamba (TV5)
- Born Impact: Born to be Wild Weekend Edition (GMA)
- Chef Boy Logro: Kusina Master (GMA)
- Sarap with Family (GMA News TV)

=== Best Educational Program Host (or Hosts) ===
- Winner: **Kim Atienza for Matanglawin (ABS-CBN)**
- Sen. Bong Revilla for Kap's Amazing Stories (GMA)
- Chef Boy Logro for Chef Boy Logro: Kusina Master (GMA)
- Chris Tiu and Moymoy Palaboy (Roadfill and James) for IBilib (GMA)
- Drew Arellano and Norman "Boobay" Balbuena for AHA! (GMA)
- Dr. Ferdz Recio and Dr. Nielsen Donato for Born to Be Wild (GMA)
- Paolo Bediones for Astig!: Sa Sports Walang Tsamba (TV5)

=== Best Celebrity Talk Show ===
- Winner: **Gandang Gabi Vice (ABS-CBN)**
- Aquino & Abunda Tonight (ABS-CBN)
- MOMents (Net 25)
- Power House (GMA News TV)
- Spoon (Net 25)
- Tapatan ni Tunying (ABS-CBN)
- The Ryzza Mae Show (GMA)

=== Best Celebrity Talk Show Host (or Hosts) ===
- Winner: **Vice Ganda for Gandang Gabi Vice (ABS-CBN)**
- Anthony Taberna for Tapatan ni Tunying (ABS-CBN)
- Boy Abunda and Kris Aquino for Aquino & Abunda Tonight (ABS-CBN)
- Gladys Reyes for MOMents (Net 25)
- Janice de Belen for Spoon (Net 25)
- Kara David for Power House (GMA News TV)
- Ryzza Mae Dizon for The Ryzza Mae Show (GMA)

=== Best Documentary Program ===
- Winner: **I-Witness (GMA)**
- Brigada (GMA News TV)
- Front Row (GMA News TV)
- Investigative Documentaries (GMA News TV)
- Kaya. (TV5)
- Reporter's Notebook (GMA)
- Reel Time (GMA News TV)

=== Best Documentary Program Host (or Hosts) ===
- Winners: **Howie Severino, Jay Taruc, Kara David and Sandra Aguinaldo for I-Witness (GMA)**
- Atom Araullo for Hiwaga (ABS-CBN)
- Jay Taruc for Motorcycle Diaries (GMA News TV)
- Jessica Soho for Brigada (GMA News TV)
- Jiggy Manicad and Maki Pulido for Reporter's Notebook (GMA)
- Malou Mangahas for Investigative Documentaries (GMA News TV)
- Rhea Santos for Tunay na Buhay (GMA)

=== Best Documentary Special ===
- Winner: **Yolanda (ABS-CBN)**
- Cheche Lazaro Presents: Ang Wika Ko (ABS-CBN)
- Cheche Lazaro Presents: Panahon Na! (ABS-CBN)
- Imelda Marcos (GMA News TV)
- Klima ng Pagbabago (Net 25)
- Lakwatsero sa Hokkaido (ABS-CBN)

=== Best Magazine Show ===
- Winner: **I Juander (GMA News TV)**
- Good News Kasama si Vicky Morales (GMA News TV)
- Kapuso Mo, Jessica Soho (GMA)
- Mutya ng Masa (ABS-CBN)
- Pop Talk (GMA News TV)
- Rated K (ABS-CBN)
- ReAksyon (TV5)

=== Best Magazine Show Host (or Hosts) ===
- Winners: **Cesar Apolinario and Susan Enriquez for I Juander (GMA News TV)**
- Bea Binene, Love Añover and Vicky Morales for Good News (GMA News TV)
- Doris Bigornia for Mutya ng Masa (ABS-CBN)
- Jessica Soho for Kapuso Mo, Jessica Soho (GMA)
- Korina Sanchez for Rated K (ABS-CBN)
- Luchi Cruz-Valdes for ReAksyon (TV5)
- Tonipet Gaba for Pop Talk (GMA News TV)

=== Best News Program ===
- Winner: **State of the Nation with Jessica Soho (GMA News TV)**
- 24 Oras (GMA)
- Aksyon (TV5)
- Balitanghali (GMA News TV)
- Bandila (ABS-CBN)
- News @ 6 (PTV)
- NewsLife (PTV)
- Saksi (GMA)
- TV Patrol (ABS-CBN)

=== Best Male Newscaster ===
- Winner: **Erwin Tulfo for Aksyon (TV5)**
- Arnold Clavio for Saksi (GMA)
- Jiggy Manicad for News TV Quick Response Team and 24 Oras Weekend (GMA/GMA News TV)
- Julius Babao for Bandila (ABS-CBN)
- Mike Enriquez for 24 Oras (GMA)
- Noli de Castro for TV Patrol (ABS-CBN)
- Ralph Obina for News @ 6 (PTV)
- Robert Tan for NewsLife (PTV)
- Ted Failon for TV Patrol (ABS-CBN)

=== Best Female Newscaster ===
- Winner: **Jessica Soho for State of the Nation (GMA News TV)**
- Cathy Untalan-Vital for NewsLife (PTV)
- Ces Oreña-Drilon for Bandila (ABS-CBN)
- Karen Davila for Bandila (ABS-CBN)
- Kathy San Gabriel for News @ 6 (PTV)
- Korina Sanchez for TV Patrol (ABS-CBN)
- Mel Tiangco for 24 Oras (GMA)
- Pia Arcangel for Balitanghali and 24 Oras Weekend (GMA News TV)
- Vicky Morales for Saksi (GMA)
- Ysabella Montano for NewsLife (PTV)

=== Best Morning Show ===
- Winner: **Umagang Kay Ganda (ABS-CBN)**
- Good Morning Boss (PTV 4)
- Good Morning Club (TV5)
- Good Morning Kuya (UNTV)
- Pambansang Almusal (Net 25)
- Unang Hirit (GMA)

=== Best Morning Show Host (or Hosts) ===
- Winners: **Anthony Taberna, Ariel Ureta, Atom Araullo, Jing Castañeda, Winnie Cordero and Zen Hernandez for Umagang Kay Ganda (ABS-CBN)**
- Arnold Clavio, Connie Sison, Ivan Mayrina, Lhar Santiago, Nathaniel "Mang Tani" Cruz, Pia Arcangel, Susan Enriquez and Suzy Entrata-Abrera for Unang Hirit (GMA)
- Audrey Gorriceta, Dianne Medina, Jules Guiang and Karla Paderna for Good Morning Boss (PTV 4)
- Cheryl Cosim, Grace Lee, Martin Andanar, Shalala and Tintin Bersola-Babao for Good Morning Club (TV5)
- Kuya Daniel Razon for Good Morning Kuya (UNTV)

=== Best Public Affairs Program ===
- Winner: **The Bottomline with Boy Abunda (ABS-CBN)**
- Adyenda (GMA News TV / Light Network 33)
- Bawal ang Pasaway kay Mareng Winnie (GMA News TV)
- Face the People (TV5)
- Failon Ngayon (ABS-CBN)
- Get It Straight with Daniel Razon (UNTV)

=== Best Public Affairs Program Host (or Hosts) ===
- Winner: **Boy Abunda for The Bottomline (ABS-CBN)**
- Kuya Daniel Razon for Get It Straight (UNTV)
- Edu Manzano, Gelli de Belen and Tintin Bersola-Babao for Face the People (TV5)
- Jean Garcia and Jolina Magdangal for Personalan: Ang Unang Hakbang (GMA News TV)
- TESDA Secretary Joel Villanueva for Adyenda (GMA News TV / Light Network 33)
- Ted Failon for Failon Ngayon (ABS-CBN)
- Winnie Monsod for Bawal ang Pasaway (GMA News TV)

=== Best Showbiz Oriented Talk Show ===
- Winner: **The Buzz (ABS-CBN)**
- Buzz ng Bayan (ABS-CBN)
- Showbiz Inside Report (ABS-CBN)
- Showbiz Police: Una sa Eksena (TV5)
- Startalk (GMA)

=== Best Male Showbiz Oriented Talk Show Host ===
- Winner: **Ricky Lo for Startalk (GMA)**
- Butch Francisco for Startalk (GMA)
- Joey de Leon for Startalk (GMA)
- Joey Marquez for Showbiz Inside Report (ABS-CBN)
- Joey Reyes for Showbiz Police (TV5)
- Ogie Diaz for Showbiz Inside Report (ABS-CBN)
- Raymond Gutierrez for Showbiz Police (TV5)

=== Best Female Showbiz Oriented Talk Show Host ===
- Winner: Toni Gonzaga for The Buzz (ABS-CBN)
- Carmina Villarroel for Buzz ng Bayan (ABS-CBN)
- Cristy Fermin for Showbiz Police (TV5)
- Heart Evangelista for Startalk (GMA)
- Janice de Belen for Buzz ng Bayan (ABS-CBN)
- Kris Aquino for The Buzz (ABS-CBN)
- Lolit Solis for Startalk (GMA)

=== Best Children's Show ===
- Winner: **Tropang Potchi (GMA)**
- The Jollitown Kids Show (GMA)
- Just 4 Kids (GMA News TV)
- The KNC Show: Kawan ng Cordero (UNTV)

=== Best Children's Show Host (or Hosts) ===
- Winners: **Isabel Frial, Kyle Danielle Ocampo, Lianne Valentino, Miggs Cuaderno, Miggy Jimenez, Nomer Limatog and Sabrina Man for Tropang Potchi (GMA)**
- Angelica Tejana, Bency Vallo, Cedie Isip, Cid Capulong, Eric Cabobos, Kayla Manarang, Kim Enriquez, Leanne Manalanzan and Moonlight Azarcon for The KNC Show (UNTV)
- Cha-Cha Cañete for Just 4 Kids (GMA News TV)

=== Best Travel Show ===
- Winner: **Biyahe ni Drew (GMA News TV)**
- Biyahero (PTV 4)
- Business Flight (GMA News TV)
- I Love Pinas (GMA News TV / Light Network 33)
- Landmarks (Net 25)
- Pinoy Explorer (TV5)

=== Best Travel Show Host (or Hosts) ===
- Winner: **Aga Muhlach for Pinoy Explorer (TV5)**
- Carlo Lorenzo for I Love Pinas (GMA News TV / Light Network 33)
- Clarisse "Ms. MJ" Aparice together with the Starcades of Show Up for Biyahero (PTV 4)
- Drew Arellano for Biyahe ni Drew (GMA News TV)
- Faye de Castro-Umandal for Landmarks (Net 25)
- Venus Raj and Cristina Decena for Business Flight (GMA News TV)

=== Best Lifestyle Show ===
- Winner: **Gandang Ricky Reyes: Todo na Toh! (GMA News TV)**
- Bread N' Butter (UNTV)
- Convergence (Net 25)
- Cook It Right (UNTV)
- Kris TV (ABS-CBN)
- Tara Let's Eat! (GMA News TV)
- Taste Buddies (GMA News TV)

=== Best Lifestyle Show Host (or Hosts) ===
- Winner: **Kris Aquino for Kris TV (ABS-CBN)**
- Arlene Razon, Kitt Meily and Rodel Flordeliz for Bread N' Butter (UNTV)
- Chef Redj Baron for Cook it Right (UNTV)
- Christopher Wong, Kyle Nofuente and Nikki Veron Cruz for Convergence (Net 25)
- Isabelle Daza and Solenn Heussaff for Taste Buddies (GMA News TV)
- Ricky Reyes for Gandang Ricky Reyes: Todo na Toh! (GMA News TV)
- Tonipet Gaba for Tara Let's Eat (GMA News TV)

== Special awards ==
=== Ading Fernando Lifetime Achievement Award ===
- Nova Villa

=== Excellence in Broadcasting Award ===
- Mike Enriquez

=== German Moreno's Power Tandem Award ===
- "KathNiel" (Kathryn Bernardo and Daniel Padilla)

=== Hall of Famer ===
- Bubble Gang (GMA) (Best Gag Show)

=== Star of the Night ===
- Iñigo Pascual (Male)
- Nadine Lustre (Female)

== See also ==
- PMPC Star Awards for Television
- 2014 in Philippine television
