= Ulat Bayan =

Evening newscast of People's Television Network

- Title card since 2020
- Genre: Newscast; Live television
- Created by: PTV News
- Directed by: John Cruz (Weeknights); Boy Osoyos (Weekends)
- Presented by: Weeknight anchors Diane Querrer; Audrey Dones Gorriceta; Ice Martinez; Weekend anchors Cleizl Pardilla; Ryan Lesigues; Sheila Natividad
- Opening theme: "Headlight News" by 2B Studio
- Country of origin: Philippines
- Original language: Tagalog

Production
- Executive producer: Kiko Cueto
- Production locations: PTV Studio A, PIA-PTV Government Center, Quezon City (2017–20); PTV Studio B, PIA-PTV Government Center, Quezon City (2020–present)
- Camera setup: Multiple-camera setup
- Running time: 60 minutes

Original release
- Network: People's Television Network
- Release: July 10, 2017 – present

Related
- PTV News

Ulat Bayan (transl. Report (to the) nation) is a Philippine television news broadcasting show broadcast by PTV. Originally anchored by Aljo Bendijo and Catherine Vital, it premiered on July 10, 2017, replacing PTV News and was replaced by the weeknight edition of PTV News only. The newscasts will be back on September 7, 2020, replacing the weeknights edition of PTV News. Diane Querrer, Audrey Dones Gorriceta and Ice Martinez for weeknights and Cleizl Pardilla, Ryan Lesigues and Sheila Natividad for weekends serve as the anchors. The newscast airs from Monday to Sunday at 6:00 p.m. to 7:00 p.m. (PST) on PTV and its livestreaming channels. It was simulcast on Radyo Pilipinas - Radyo Publiko every weekends, Sports Radio 918 every Saturday, and Capital 104.3 every weeknight.

== History ==
=== 2017: Bendijo and Untalan era ===
Ulat Bayan started airing as a daily primetime newscast on July 10, 2017, replacing PTV News, as part of programming changes brought about by the relaunch of PTV on June 28, 2017. PTV News holdover Aljo Bendijo and Cathy Untalan (from the late-night edition) first served as a anchors, joining the segment anchors are Ice Martinez-Pajarillo and Angel Atienza. Roughly after two months, the weekday edition was axed and reverted to PTV News, with anchoring changes also made in the chair. Erwin Tulfo and Diane Querrer began anchoring the relaunched PTV News, while Ulat Bayan became a weekend newscast which aired on Saturdays and Sundays from 6:00 to 7:00 PM PST and with the Sunday edition being replayed every Monday from 6:00 to 7:00 AM PST. It was also simulcasted on government radio network Radyo Pilipinas.

The weekend editions, will premiered on July 15, 2017, at 6:00pm to 7:00pm, replacing PTV News: Weekend edition, Originally anchored by Rocky Ignacio and Ralph Obina for Saturday editions and Joseph Parafina and Marita Moaje for Sunday editions.

=== 2020-21: Power 4 ===
It was slated to air again on weeknight evenings beginning August 12, 2020, but was put on hold after COVID-19 infections in the People's Television Network, as well as disinfection procedures. This delayed the relaunch to almost a month, with the new Ulat Bayan plugs was teasing by Erwin Tulfo and together with Aljo Bendijo, Diane Querrer and Alex Santos was airing before September 7, 2020.

On September 12, 2020, five days before the weekend editions was revamped into Ulat Bayan Weekend anchored by Undersecretary Rocky Ignacio and PTV News Tonight anchor Joee Guilas (every Saturday) and PTV correspondents Eunice Samonte, Daniel Manalastas, Juliet Caranguian, Sweeden Velado-Ramirez and Kenneth Paciente (every Sunday).

On its debut episode, Ulat Bayan, alongside new morning show Rise and Shine Pilipinas, afternoon newscast Sentro Balita, PTV Balita Ngayon and late-night newscast PTV News Tonight, transferred to a revamped Studio B, while updating its graphics, theme music, and title card, leaving PTV Studio A for use of the network's other programs including its public service program, Public Briefing: #LagingHandaPH and Digong 8888 Hotline. In addition, it adopted new presenter format of four main presenters (as opposed to one or two to three presenters on other networks' news broadcasts), at the mirroring competitor TV Patrol on ABS-CBN's Kapamilya Channel which adopted the four-presenter format in its broadcasts from 1987 to 1996 and again on January 9, 2023.

On April 5, 2021, Bendijo who left the show to concentrate on a weekday morning program Rise and Shine Pilipinas. leaving Tulfo, Querrer and Santos serves as main anchors.

From May 21 to July 16, 2021, Tulfo was on self-quarantine, Given to Sentro Balita anchor Gani Oro serves as the Weeknight Co-Anchor along with Santos and Querrer, due to the reimposed enhanced community quarantine caused by the surge of COVID-19 cases in the Greater Manila Area as well as a full bed capacity in different Hospitals that started on March 17, 2021. Tulfo returning anchor to the Studio on July 19, 2021. Bendijo also returned to Ulat Bayan beginning October 29, 2021 as rejoins also Tulfo, Querrer and Santos.

=== Santos, Bendijo, Tulfo and Oro's departure ===
On December 22, 2021, Alex Santos, who also left the newscast as he moves to Net 25 as rehost for Responde and anchoring for Mata ng Agila. He was replaced by Audrey Gorriceta, who rejoined Querrer by December 23, 2021. On July 8, 2022, Aljo Bendijo who left the newscast, and were moved to, and as host for Public Briefing: #LagingHandaPH and anchoring for Sentro Balita, Erwin Tulfo bid farewell the newscast, to concentrate on campaigning for ACT-CIS Partylist where he is the chairman and his brother Raffy who ran for senator at the 2022 elections. Maan Macapagal served as Tulfo's replacement since March 21, 2022, and Gani Oro became the newscaster of Ulat Bayan on May 30, 2022, replacing Gorriceta held until July 7, 2022. On July 8, 2022, Gorriceta returned to Ulat Bayan as rejoins Querrer and Macapagal replacing Bendijo and Oro.

==== Departure of weekend editions ====
However, Rocky Ignacio, who left the newscast on June 25, 2022, Joee Guilas, who left the newscast on April 1, 2023, and also Chi Atienza-Valdepeñas, Mela Lesmoras, Daniel Manalastas, Allan Francisco, and Kenneth Paciente, who also left the newscast on July 29 and 30, 2023, he was replaced by Dominic Almelor on August 5, 2023, until November 10, 2024, and were replaced by Maan Macapagal on November 16, 2024.

On August 22, 2023, Aljo Bendijo once again returned to Ulat Bayan, replacing Gorriceta, and rejoined also Querrer and Macapagal. Bill Velasco, with Meg Siozon and Shiela Salaysay, became as PTV Sports segment anchor on September 11, 2023. On July 15, 2024, Audrey Gorriceta returned to Ulat Bayan, replacing Bendijo.

== Anchors ==
Weeknight editions

- Diane Querrer (2020–present)
- Audrey Dones Gorriceta (2021–22, 2022–23, 2024–present)
- Marice "Ice" Martinez-Pajarillo (PTV InfoWeather: 2017-2020, Pana-Panahon Lang and Ulat Showbiz: 2025–present)

Weekend editions

- Cleizl Pardilla (Weekend anchor: 2025–present)
- Ryan Lesigues (2025–present)
- Sheila Natividad (2026–present)

=== Former anchors ===
Weeknight editions

- Alex Santos (2020–21)
- Aljo Bendijo (2017, 2020–22, 2023–24)
- Catherine Vital (2017)
- Erwin Tulfo (2020–21)
- Gani Oro (2022, former relief anchor for Tulfo, Bendijo and Santos)
- Maan Macapagal (2022–25)
- Dominic Almelor (2025)

Weekend editions

- Rocky Ignacio (Saturday anchor, 2017–22)
- Joee Guilas (Saturday anchor, 2020–23)
- Chi Atienza-Valdepeñas (Saturday anchor, 2022–23)
- Ralph Obina (Saturday anchor, 2017–19)
- Ceasar Soriano (Saturday and Sunday anchor, 2019)
- Joseph Parafina (Sunday anchor, 2017–19)
- Marita Moaje (Sunday anchor, 2017–19)
- Sweeden Velado-Ramirez (Sunday anchor, 2018, 2020–22)
- Naomi Tiburcio (Sunday anchor, 2020)
- Mela Lesmoras (Sunday anchor, 2020–23)
- Juliet Caranguian (Sunday anchor, 2019–21)
- Eunice Samonte (Sunday anchor, 2017–22)
- Kenneth Paciente (Sunday anchor, 2020–23)
- Daniel Manalastas (Sunday anchor, 2020–23, 2024–25)
- Allan Francisco (Sunday anchor, 2020–23)
- Dominic Almelor (Weekend anchor, 2023–24)
- Maan Macapagal (Saturday anchor: 2022, Weekend anchor: 2024–25)
- Patrick De Jesus (Sunday anchor, 2020, Saturday anchor, 2024–26)

Former segment presenters

- Trixie Jaafar-Tiu (PTV InfoWeather Weekend)
- Arrian Jeff Ignacio (Traffic Watch)
- Greco Belgica (Pahirap Ang Korap: PACC in Action: 2021)
- Bill Velasco (Ulat Sports) (Weekdays: 2023–24)
- CSC Chairman Karlo Nograles (CSC in Action) (Weekend: 2023, 2024)
- Meg Siozon (Ulat Sports) (2017, 2023–24)
- Shiela Salaysay (Ulat Sports) (2023–24)

== Segments ==
Current

Weeknights

- PTV Exclusive (since 2020)
- Police Report (since 2017)
- Express Balita (since 2020)
- Pana-Panahon Lang (formerly PTV InfoWeather, 2017–25) (since 2017)
- Ulat Probinsya (formerly Pasada Probinsya) (since 2020)
- Ulat Abroad (since 2017)
- Ulat Sports (formerly PTV Sports) (since 2023)
- Ulat Showbiz (since 2022)
- Trip Ko 'To (since 2022)
- Patok sa Bayan (formerly Good News, 2020–22) (since 2020)

Weekends

- PTV Exclusive (since 2020)
- Police Report (since 2022)
- Bantay Presyo sa Krudo (since 2023)
- Ulat Panahon (formerly PTV InfoWeather) (since 2017)
- TrabaHunting (since 2022)
- Ulat Probinsya (since 2020)
- Ulat Abroad (since 2017)
- Ulat Sports (formerly PTV Sports) (since 2023)
- Ulat Showbiz (since 2022)
- Balitang Feel-Good (formerly Good News, 2020–22 and Patok sa Bayan, 2022–24) (since 2020)

Former

Weeknights

- Tapang ng Batas (2017)
- Salot na Droga (2020–23)
- Balitang ASEAN (2017–22)
- Ulat Serye (2020–22)
- Government at Work (2020–22)
- Trending Balita (2020–21)
- Pahirap Ang Korap: PACC in Action (2021)
- Diskarteng Pinoy (2023)
- Ratsada Balita (2023–24)
- PCSO Lottery Draw Update (2023–24)

Weekends

- Batas at Katarungan (2020–22)
- Serbisyo OFW (2020–21)
- Salot na Droga (2018–23)
- Balitang ASEAN (2017–22)
- Ulat Negosyo (2017–23)
- Ratsada Balita (2023–24)
- CSC in Action – hosted by Karlo Nograles (2023, 2024)
- PCSO Lottery Draw Update (2023–24)

== See also ==
- List of programs broadcast by People's Television Network
- PTV News Tonight
