= One Morning Cafe =

Morning show in the Philippines

- Logo used from 2007 to 2008.
- Genre: Morning news and talk show
- Developed by: Vizmalu Bonalos
- Directed by: Leo Docto; Bebbs Alvarez
- Presented by: see Hosts
- Country of origin: Philippines

Production
- Executive producers: Gina Borinaga; Pong Olanday; Lorna Feliciano; Rowie Valencia; Emily Albotra; Lulu Matubis; Benjie Poblete; Rose Marie Manalansang; Mari Besi Cruz Valdez; Jun Del Rosario
- Production locations: NBN Studios, PIA-NBN Government Center, Quezon City
- Running time: 2 hours
- Production company: Government Communications Group

Original release
- Network: NBN 4 RPN 9 IBC 13
- Release: April 9, 2007 – June 29, 2010

Related
- Solar Daybreak; RadyoBisyon; Rise and Shine Pilipinas; Treze Mornings

One Morning Cafe
- Other names: One Morning (2007–2009)
- Genre: Morning news and talk show
- Running time: 2 hours (6:00 am – 8:00 am)
- Country of origin: Philippines
- Home station: DZRB-AM; 32 PBS Radyo ng Bayan stations 13 RPN Radyo Ronda stations
- Original release: April 9, 2007 – June 29, 2010

One Morning Cafe (formerly One Morning) is a Philippine television news broadcasting and talk show broadcast by NBN 4, RPN 9 and IBC 13 on television and RPN Radyo Ronda and PBS Radyo ng Bayan on radio. Originally hosted by Veronica Baluyut-Jimenez, Jasmine Romero, Aljo Bendijo, Aryana Lim and Bobby Yan and Zorayda Ruth Andam, it aired from April 9, 2007 to June 29, 2010, replacing The Morning Show. Baluyut-Jimenez, Bendijo, Cutie Del Mar and Oliver Abelleda serves as the final hosts.

== Hosts ==
=== Final hosts ===
- Veronica Baluyut-Jimenez (NBN)
- Aljo Bendijo (RPN)
- Cutie Del Mar (IBC)
- Oliver Abelleda (PBS Radyo ng Bayan)

=== Former hosts ===
- Marion Chua (NBN)
- Claudine Trillo (NBN)
- Jasmin Romero (NBN)
- Aryana Lim (RPN)
- Bobby Yan (RPN)
- Jennifer Illustre (IBC)
- Zyrene Parsad (IBC)
- Zorayda Ruth Andam (IBC)
- JM Rodriguez
- Charlene Lontoc

== See also ==
- List of programs broadcast by People's Television Network
- List of programs previously broadcast by Radio Philippines Network
- List of programs broadcast by Intercontinental Broadcasting Corporation
