= Sentro Balita =

Afternoon newscast of People's Television Network

- Title card since 2020
- Genre: Newscast; Live television
- Created by: PTV News
- Directed by: Jose Chito Cabatuando (Weekdays); Boy Osoyos (Weekends)
- Presented by: Angelique Lazo; Jules Guiang; Trixie Jaafar-Tiu
- Country of origin: Philippines
- Original language: Filipino

Production
- Executive producer: Essen Mei Miguel
- Producers: Angelique Lazo (OIC, News Division)
- Production locations: PTV Studio A, PIA-PTV Government Center, Quezon City (2017–20); PTV Studio B, PIA-PTV Government Center, Quezon City (2020–present)
- Camera setup: Multicamera setup
- Running time: 60 minutes (Weekdays); 30 minutes (Weekends)

Original release
- Network: PTV
- Release: July 10, 2017 – present

Related
- PTV News; Ulat Bayan; Rise and Shine Pilipinas; PTV News Tonight

Sentro Balita (transl. News Center) is a Philippine television news broadcasting show broadcast by PTV. Originally anchored by Angelique Lazo and Alex Santos, it premiered on July 10, 2017, replacing the afternoon edition of PTV News. Lazo, Jules Guiang and Trixie Jaafar-Tiu for weekdays and Kenneth Paciente for weekends currently serve as the anchors. The newscast airs from Monday to Friday at 1:00 pm to 2:00 pm (PST) and from Saturday and Sunday at 1:00 pm to 1:30 pm on PTV and its livestreaming channels. It was simulcast on IBC from July 10, 2017 to October 20, 2024.

== Anchors ==
=== Current anchors ===
- Angelique Lazo (2017–present)
- Jules Guiang (2026–present)
- Trixie Jaafar-Tiu (PTV InfoWeather: 2020–22, main anchor: 2026–present)

=== Weekend anchor ===
- Kenneth Paciente (2024–present)

=== Former weekday anchors ===
- Alex Santos (2017–2018)
- Aljo Bendijo (2018–20, 2022–23, 2024–26)
- Audrey Gorriceta (2021–22, 2023–24)
- Gani Oro (2020–21)
- Naomi Tiburcio (2023–26)
- Niña Corpuz (2024)

=== Former segment presenters ===
- Ice Martinez-Pajarillo (PTV InfoWeather)
- Atty. Persida Rueda-Acosta (Tapang ng Batas)
- Princess Habibah Sarip-Paudac (Salam News Daily)

=== Former weekend anchors ===
- Allan Francisco (2024–25)
- Cleizl Pardilla (2024–25)
- Mela Lesmoras (2024–25)
- Ryan Lesigues (2025)
- Denisse Osorio (2025)
- Louisa Erispe (2024–26)

== Reporters ==
National correspondents

- Angelika Abrogar
- Azie Roberto
- Bernadette Tinoy
- Bernard Ferrer
- Cleizl Pardilla
- Floyd Brenz
- Gab Villegas
- Joshua Garcia (not to be confused with the actor of the same name)
- Joyce Salamatin
- Kenneth Paciente
- Louisa Erispe
- Meg Siozon
- Paolo Salamatin
- Patrick de Jesus
- Rafael Bandayrel
- Rod Lagusad
- Ryan Lesigues
- Shiela Nativdad
- Vel Custodio

== Segments ==
Current

Weekdays

- PTV Traffic Center (Traffic Update) (since 2017)
- Police Report (Police Report) (since 2017)
- PTV InfoWeather (Weather Forecast) (since 2017)
- Government in Action (formerly Government at Work) (Report about the government) (since 2021)
- Sentro Probinsya (since 2020)
- GloBalita (formerly Balitang Abroad) (World News) (since 2017)
- Time Out (formerly PTV Sports) (Sports News) (since 2017)
- Sentro Showbiz (Entertainment News) (since 2017)
- Trip Ko 'To (Travelogue Segment) (since 2022)
- Patok sa Bayan (Feature) (since 2022)

Weekends

- Police Report (Police Report) (since 2024)
- PTV InfoWeather (Weather Forecast) (since 2024)
- Spotlight (since 2024)
- GloBalita (formerly Balitang Abroad) (World News) (since 2024)
- Good Take (since 2024)
- Time Out (formerly PTV Sports) (Sports News) (since 2024)
- Sentro Showbiz (Entertainment News) (since 2024)
- Now Trending (since 2024)
- CSC in Action – hosted by Karlo Nograles (since 2024)

Former

- Salot na Droga (2018–2023)
- Malasakit @ Work (Public Service) (2020-2024)
- Sentro Serbisyo (Public Service) (2020–2021)
- Balitang ASEAN (ASEAN News) (2017–2023)
- Kusina ng Masa (2020)

== See also ==
- List of programs broadcast by People's Television Network
- Rise and Shine Pilipinas
- Ulat Bayan
- PTV Balita Ngayon
- PTV News Tonight
