= Aljo =

Aljo or ALJO may refer to:

- Aljamain Sterling (nicknamed "Aljo"; born 1989), American mixed martial artist
- Aljo Bendijo (born 1974), Filipino journalist
- Afro Latin Jazz Orchestra, band formed by Arturo O'Farrill
