= Ginger Conejero =

Filipina beauty queen and TV reporter

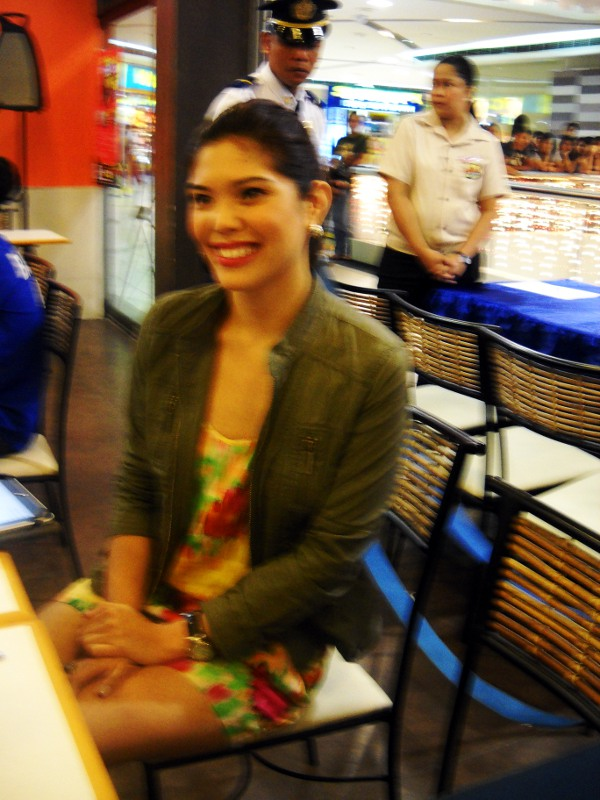
- Born: Ginger Ann Conejero (Note: Ginger Conejero was born in the United States. Thus, she does not possess her mother's maiden name which is Abadiano.); July 16, 1984 (age 42); San Francisco, California, U.S.
- Occupation: Television reporter
- Beauty pageant titleholder
- Years active: 1997–present
- Major competitions: Miss Philippines Earth 2006 (Miss Philippines Air)

Ginger Ann Conejero (Tagalog pronunciation: [kɔnɛˈhɛɾɔ]; born July 16, 1984) is a Filipino beauty queen, TV reporter, and host for ABS-CBN. She has worked for the NBC San Francisco affiliate, KNTV, since 2021.

== Biography ==
She joined Miss Philippines Earth 2006 and won the title of Miss Philippines Air (1st Runner-Up). After her reign as Miss Philippines Air, she joined ABS-CBN as an entertainment reporter for TV Patrol and Mornings @ ANC.

From 2009 to 2011, Conejero hosted the morning show Umagang Kay Ganda with Atom Araullo.

== Awards and nominations ==
Year	Award giving body	Category	Nominated work	Results
2009	23rd PMPC Star Awards for TV	Best Morning Show Host (shared with Umagang Kay Ganda hosts)	Umagang Kay Ganda	Won
2010	24th PMPC Star Awards for TV	Best Morning Show Host (shared with Umagang Kay Ganda hosts)	Umagang Kay Ganda	Won
2010	8th Gawad Tanglaw Awards	Best Morning Show Host (shared with Umagang Kay Ganda hosts)	Umagang Kay Ganda	Won
2010	1st Media Newser Philippines Awards	Best Morning Show Host (shared with Umagang Kay Ganda hosts)	Umagang Kay Ganda	Won
2011	25th PMPC Star Awards for TV	Best Morning Show Host (shared with Umagang Kay Ganda hosts)	Umagang Kay Ganda	Won
2011	5th UPLB Gandingan Awards	Best Morning Show Host (shared with Umagang Kay Ganda hosts)	Umagang Kay Ganda	Won

== External links and references ==
- - from PEP.ph
- - from ABS-CBN News website
- - from The Manila Bulletin
