= Dading (TV series) =

2014 Philippine television drama series

- Title card
- Genre: Drama
- Created by: Denoy Navarro-Punio
- Written by: Denoy Navarro-Punio; Renei Dimla; Evie Macapugay
- Directed by: Ricky Davao
- Creative director: Jun Lana
- Starring: Gabby Eigenmann
- Theme music composer: Janno Gibbs
- Opening theme: "Dading" by Gabby Eigenmann
- Country of origin: Philippines
- Original language: Tagalog
- No. of episodes: 79 (list of episodes)

Production
- Executive producer: Marjorie P. Garcia
- Production locations: Manila, Philippines
- Editors: Robert Ryan Reyes; Noel Stamatelaky Mauricio II
- Camera setup: Multiple-camera setup
- Running time: 18–30 minutes
- Production company: GMA Entertainment TV

Original release
- Network: GMA Network
- Release: June 23 – October 10, 2014

Dading is a 2014 Philippine television drama series broadcast by GMA Network. Directed by Ricky Davao, it stars Gabby Eigenmann in the title role. It premiered on June 23, 2014 on the network's Afternoon Prime line up. The series concluded on October 10, 2014, with a total of 79 episodes.

The series is streaming online on YouTube.

== Premise ==
Carding is an adult gay man who decided to raise Precious – the love child of his best friend, Beth and her lover Joemer.

== Cast and characters ==
Cast

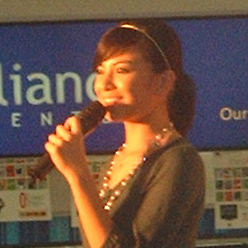
Glaiza de Castro

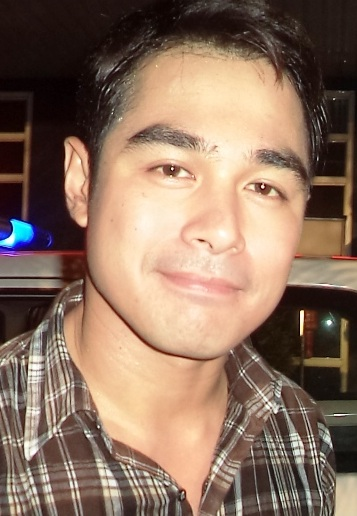
Benjamin Alves

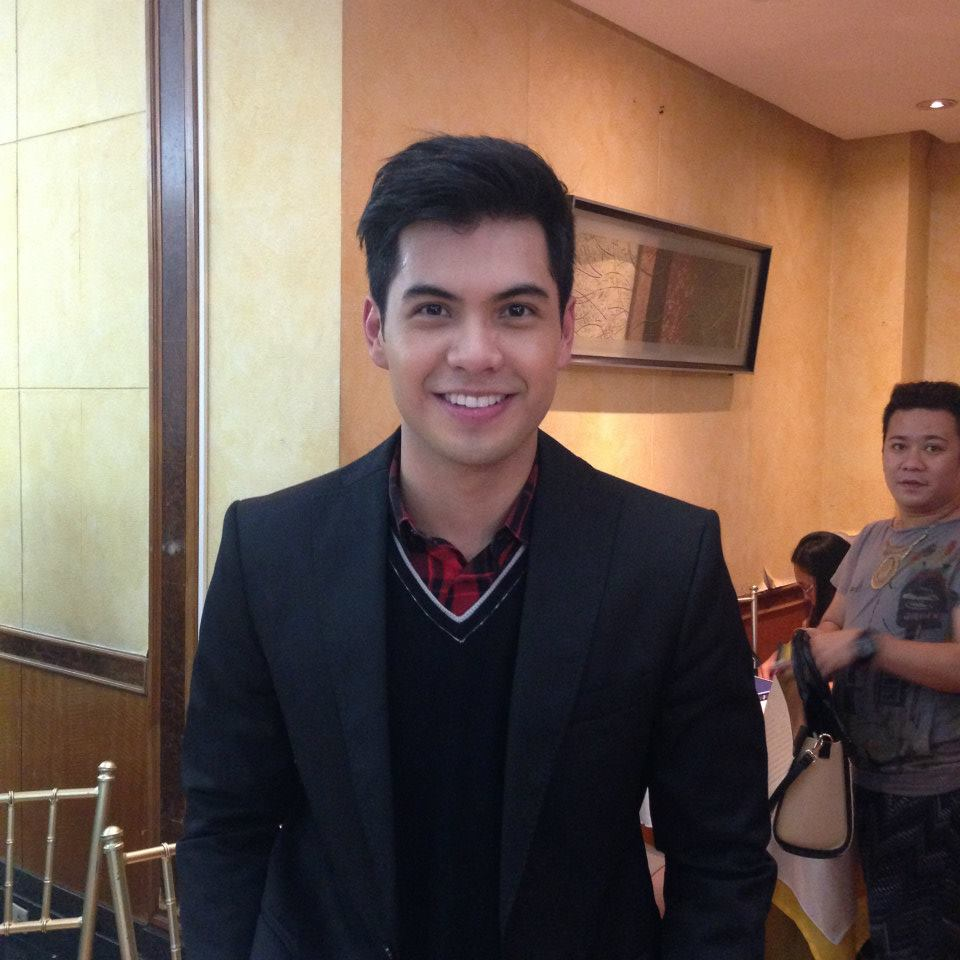
Ken Alfonso

Lead cast

- Gabby Eigenmann as Ricardo "Carding / Dading" Gonzales

Supporting cast

- Glaiza de Castro as Elizabeth "Beth" Marasigan-Gonzales
- Benjamin Alves as Joemar "JM" Rodriguez
- Chynna Ortaleza as Celine Pacheco-Rodriguez
- Gardo Versoza as Alfredo "Mother Lexi" Ignacio
- Sharmaine Buencamino as Mila Marasigan
- Toby Alejar as Bernard Marasigan
- Mymy Davao as Nenette Velasquez
- RJ Padilla as Dindo
- Zarah Mae Deligero as Precious M. Rodriguez

Guest cast

- Elle Ramirez as Glenda
- Zandra Summer as Josie
- Juan Rodrigo as Romeo Rodriguez
- Maricel Morales as Therese Santiago
- Almira Muhlach as Veronne Pacheco
- Julia Lee as Sofia
- Ken Alfonso as Carlo
- Sef Cadayona as Pato
- Sofia Pablo as Hannah
- Lexter Capili as Bebet
- Bianca Umali as teenage Precious
- Antoinette Garcia
- Freddie Webb as Ricardo's father

== Ratings ==
According to AGB Nielsen Philippines' Mega Manila household television ratings, the pilot episode of Dading earned an 11.6% rating. The final episode scored a 20.6% rating, which is the series' highest rating.

== Accolades ==
Accolades received by Dading
Year	Award	Category	Recipient	Result	Ref.
2014	28th PMPC Star Awards for Television	Best Daytime Drama Series	Dading	Nominated	
2014	28th PMPC Star Awards for Television	Best Drama Actor	Gabby Eigenmann	Nominated	
