= Edmund Rosales =

Filipino astronomer and meteorologist

- Born: Edmund Rosales
- Education: Far Eastern University
- Occupations: Astronomer, meteorologist, host, professor
- Spouse: Bernadette Rosales
- Children: Luigi Rosales; Bea Nicole Rosales

Edmund Rosales is a Filipino astronomer and meteorologist and a former president of the Philippine Astronomical Society and Cofounder of The Astronomical League of the Philippines. He is currently the resident meteorologist in the Philippine television show, Rise and Shine Pilipinas.

== Personal life ==
Rosales graduated with a BS Biology degree in 1987, and proceeded to take up Medicine in 1988 in the Far Eastern University.

He got married in 1995 to Bernadette, a nutritionist and dietitian who also worked at NISMED, and they have a son and a daughter.

== Career ==
Edmund graduated with a BS Biology degree in 1987, and proceeded to take up Medicine in 1988. However, he still continued with his "extracurricular" activities in astronomy. Once, sometime in 1989, Fr. Victor Badillo (who was then president of the PAS of which Edmund was also a member) was supposed to give a lecture in NISMED but could not make it at the last minute. Fr. Badillo then asked Edmund to substitute for him. He arrived on time for the scheduled lecture, but found the teachers there still waiting for someone so he also waited. The waiting game ended when the organizers asked him when Mr. Rosales would be arriving, not knowing that he was Mr. Rosales, with him looking so youthful.

However, the teachers and the organizers liked Edmund's lecture and he was invited the second time. Eventually, they offered him a regular job at NISMED. By then, Edmund was already in Medicine proper, but for him, his priorities were clear. He did not hesitate to accept the job and went on leave from his medical studies.

In 2012, Rosales started his career as a resident meteorologist in the Philippine morning television show, Umagang Kay Ganda.

Rosales is a former president of the Philippine Astronomical Society., and former Vice President of Astronomical League of the Philippines (ALP), an organization he established with other amateur astronomers.

== See also ==
- Kim Atienza
- TV Patrol
- Umagang Kay Ganda
- People's Television Network
