= RadyoBisyon =

Philippine defunct radio show

- Directed by: Boy Osoyos; Zaldy Dela Cruz
- Presented by: Aljo Bendijo; Czarinah Lusuegro
- Country of origin: Philippines
- No. of episodes: n/a (airs everyday)

Production
- Executive producers: Richard Noblejas; Allan Allanigue
- Production locations: Radyo ng Bayan Studio PIA Bldg., Quezon City, Philippines (Radyo ng Bayan); PTV Studio A, Broadcast Complex, Quezon City (live) (PTV)
- Camera setup: Multi-camera setup
- Running time: 60 minutes
- Production company: Media ng Bayan

Original release
- Network: People's Television Network, IBC
- Release: October 6, 2014 – June 2, 2017

Related
- One Morning Cafe

RadyoBisyon
- Genre: Morning news and talk show
- Running time: 60 minutes
- Country of origin: Philippines
- Home station: DZRB-AM; PBS Radyo ng Bayan stations
- Original release: October 6, 2014 – June 2, 2017

RadyoBisyon (RadioVision, a portmanteau of the Filipino words for "radio" and "television") was a Philippine national morning radio and television newscast produced by Media ng Bayan, the government's media arm. MNB was composed of the Philippine Information Agency, Philippine Broadcasting Service - Radyo ng Bayan, People's Television Network, Intercontinental Broadcasting Corporation, and the Philippines News Agency.

The program aired on PTV, IBC, and PBS-Radyo ng Bayan. It premiered on MNB's state-owned TV and radio stations on October 6, 2014, and was broadcast from 6:00 – 7:00 AM PST.

Prior to RadyoBisyon, PTV (formerly NBN), IBC, and Radyo ng Bayan had aired a similar joint morning show, One Morning Cafe, which ran from 2007 to 2010, along with the then-government-owned Radio Philippines Network, now majority-owned by the ALC Group of Companies.

RadyoBisyon aired its final broadcast on June 2, 2017, as Radyo ng Bayan 738 was rebranded as Radyo Pilipinas 1 (RP1) on June 5, 2017.

== Final presenters ==
- Aljo Bendijo (DZRB Radyo ng Bayan) (2016–17)
- Czarinah Lusuegro (DZRB Radyo ng Bayan) (2014–15, 2016–17)

=== Segments ===
- Words of Wisdom
- PTV News sa RadyoBisyon
- Provincial Round-up
- On the Road
- PTV InfoWeather
- Hapag ng Talastasan

=== Former anchors ===
- Francis Cansino (DZRB Radyo ng Bayan) (2014–16)
- Julius Disamburun (PTV) (2014–15)
- Vivienne Gulla (PTV) (2014–15)
- Maria Arra Perez (PTV) (2015–16)
- Audrey Gorriceta (PTV) (2016–17)

== See also ==
- List of programs broadcast by People's Television Network
