= List of Dading episodes =

Dading is a 2014 Philippine television drama series broadcast by GMA Network. It premiered on the network's Afternoon Prime line up from June 23, 2014 to October 10, 2014, replacing Innamorata.

Mega Manila ratings are provided by AGB Nielsen Philippines.

== Series overview ==
Month	Episodes	Monthly Averages
Month	Episodes	Mega Manila
June 2014	6	12.6%
July 2014	22	13.6%
August 2014	21	14.5%
September 2014	22	14.3%
October 2014	8	16.6%
Total	79	14.3%

== Episodes ==
=== June 2014 ===
Episode		Original air date	Social Media Hashtag	AGB Nielsen Mega Manila Households in Television Homes			Ref.
Episode		Original air date	Social Media Hashtag	Rating	Timeslot Rank	Daytime Rank	Ref.
1	Unang Bonding	June 23, 2014	#DadingUnangBonding	11.6%	#1	#7	
2	Preggy na si Beth	June 24, 2014	#DadingPreggyNaSiBeth	11.8%	#1	#5	
3	May BFF na si Carding	June 25, 2014	#MayBFFNaSiCarding	12.1%	#1	#6	
4	Kutob ni Beth	June 26, 2014	#DadingKutobNiBeth	12.4%	#1	#6	
5	BFF or BF?	June 27, 2014	#DadingBFForBF	13.1%	#1	#5	
6	Bye Bye, Dindo	June 30, 2014	#ByeByeDindo	14.7%	#1	#3	

=== July 2014 ===
Episode		Original air date	Social Media Hashtag	AGB Nielsen Mega Manila Households in Television Homes			Ref.
Episode		Original air date	Social Media Hashtag	Rating	Timeslot Rank	Daytime Rank	Ref.
7	Dading Welcomes Precious	July 1, 2014	#DadingWelcomesPrecious	14.3%	#1	#2	
8	Pagsubok kay Dading	July 2, 2014	#PagsubokKayDading	14.0%	#1	#3	
9	May Sakit si Dading	July 3, 2014	#MaySakitSiDading	14.2%	#1	#4	
10	A Dading Proposal	July 4, 2014	#ADadingProposal	14.7%	#1	#2	
11	Wedding ni Carding	July 7, 2014	#WeddingNiCarding	14.9%	#1	#3	
12	A Happy Family	July 8, 2014	#AHappyFamily	14.5%	#1	#4	
13	Bakery Problem	July 9, 2014	#BakeryProblem	15.7%	#1	#5	
14	Nagbalik ang Ex	July 10, 2014	#NagbalikAngEx	14.9%	#1	#3	
15	Meet New GF	July 11, 2014	#MeetNewGF	15.4%	#1	#4	
16	Ang Bagong Joemer	July 14, 2014	#AngBagongJoemer	14.5%	#1	#4	
17	Be strong, Dading!	July 15, 2014	#BeStrongDading	18.7%	#1	#3	
18	Sideline ni Dading	July 16, 2014	#SidelineNiDading	6.9%	#1	#2	
19	Past ni Joemer	July 17, 2014	#PastNiJoemer	8.6%	#1	#4	
20	Agam-agam ni Beth	July 18, 2014	#AgamAgamNiBeth	10.3%	#1	#4	
21	Hiling ng Tunay na Ama	July 21, 2014	#HilingNgTunayNaAma	11.7%	#1	#4	
22	Ang Takot ni Dading	July 22, 2014	#AngTakotNiDading	14.4%	#1	#3	
23	Truth About Joemer	July 23, 2014	#TruthAboutJoemer	14.4%	#1	#4	
24	Desisyon ni Beth	July 24, 2014	#DesisyonNiBeth	13.7%	#1	#4	
25	Ang Child Custody	July 25, 2014	#AngChildCustody	13.5%	#1	#4	
26	Rampa para sa Anak	July 29, 2014 (Note: Episode 26 did not air on July 28 during the 2014 State of the Nation Address live coverage)	#RampaParaSaAnak	14.4%	#1	#3	
27	Laban ni Dading	July 30, 2014	#LabanNiDading	11.6%	#1	#7	
28	True Dad or Dading?	July 31, 2014	#TrueDadOrDading	13.2%	#1	#4	

=== August 2014 ===
Episode		Original air date	Social Media Hashtag	AGB Nielsen Mega Manila Households in Television Homes			Ref.
Episode		Original air date	Social Media Hashtag	Rating	Timeslot Rank	Daytime Rank	Ref.
29	Galit ni Dading	August 1, 2014	#GalitNiDading	14.3%	#1	#4	
30	Ang Muling Paghaharap	August 4, 2014	#AngMulingPaghaharap	15.5%	#1	#4	
31	Umpisa ng Matinding Pagsubok	August 5, 2014	#UmpisaNgMatindingPagsubok	15.8%	#1	#4	
32	Dading vs. Ninong	August 6, 2014	#DadingVSNinong	14.4%	#1	#4	
33	Hurt si Dading	August 7, 2014	#HurtSiDading	14.5%	#1	#3	
34	Sasabog si Dading	August 8, 2014	#SasabogSiDading	14.6%	#1	#4	
35	Bakas ng Nakaraan	August 11, 2014	#BakasNgNakaraan	13.6%	#1	#4	
36	Magkaibang Desisyon	August 12, 2014	#MagkaibangDesisyon	12.3%	#1	#5	
37	Dading in Pain	August 13, 2014	#DadingInPain	13.8%	#1	#4	
38	Nagbabalik na Damdamin	August 14, 2014	#NagbabalikNaDamdamin	13.4%	#1	#4	
39	The Kiss	August 15, 2014	#TheKiss	14.0%	#1	#5	
40	After the Kiss	August 18, 2014	#AfterTheKiss	14.2%	#1	#4	
41	Joemer is Here to Stay	August 19, 2014	#JoemerIsHereToStay	13.7%	#1	#6	
42	Pangamba ni Celine	August 20, 2014	#PangambaNiCeline	14.8%	#1	#5	
43	Pagsisinungaling ni Beth	August 21, 2014	#Dading	13.0%	#1	#6	
44	Nilalabanan na Damdamin	August 22, 2014	#NilalabananNaDamdamin	14.2%	#1	#5	
45	Damdamin ng Nakaraan	August 25, 2014	#DamdaminNgNakaraan	13.6%	#1	#5	
46	The Confession	August 26, 2014	#TheConfession	17.9%	#1	#3	
47	Magulong Love Triangle	August 27, 2014	#MagulongLoveTriangle	15.0%	#1	#4	
48	Confused Heart ni Beth	August 28, 2014	#ConfusedHeartNiBeth	16.9%	#1	#4	
49	Tulirong Puso	August 29, 2014	#TulirongPuso	14.4%	#1	#6	

=== September 2014 ===
Episode		Original air date	Social Media Hashtag	AGB Nielsen Mega Manila Households in Television Homes			Ref.
Episode		Original air date	Social Media Hashtag	Rating	Timeslot Rank	Daytime Rank	Ref.
50	Mahal pa rin	September 1, 2014	#Dading	14.0%	#1	#4	
51	Bawal na Relasyon	September 2, 2014	#BawalNaRelasyon	14.7%	#1	#4	
52	Bilin ni Lexi	September 3, 2014	#BilinNiLexi	13.9%	#1	#5	
53	End of a Secret Affair	September 4, 2014	#EndOfASecretAffair	14.2%	#1	#5	
54	Mag-asawang Sampal	September 5, 2014	#MagAsawangSampal	14.5%	#1	#4	
55	Masakit na Katotohanan	September 8, 2014	#MasakitNaKatotohanan	14.3%	#1	#4	
56	Bunga ng Pagtataksil	September 9, 2014	#BungaNgPagtataksil	14.4%	#1	#6	
57	Pagdurusa ni Beth	September 10, 2014	#PagdurusaNiBeth	14.2%	#1	#5	
58	Patawad, Carding	September 11, 2014	#PatawadCarding	13.6%	#1	#4	
59	Isa Pang Pagkakataon	September 12, 2014	#IsaPangPagkakataon	13.2%	#1	#4	
60	A Better Relationship	September 15, 2014	#ABetterRelationship	16.2%	#1	#3	
61	Kaganapan sa Kaarawan	September 16, 2014	#KaganapanSaKaarawan	14.3%	#1	#3	
62	Harapan ng Magkaribal	September 17, 2014	#HarapanNgMagkaribal	14.7%	#1	#3	
63	Kiss of True Love	September 18, 2014	#KissOfTrueLove	13.9%	#1	#6	
64	Resulta ng Pagtataksil	September 19, 2014	#ResultaNgPagtataksil	15.6%	#1	#6	
65	Buntis si Beth	September 22, 2014	#BuntisSiBeth	13.8%	#1	#4	
66	Ang Kutob ni Carding	September 23, 2014	#AngKutobNiCarding	13.5%	#1	#4	
67	Nalilitong Puso	September 24, 2014	#NalilitongPuso	14.8%	#1	#4	
68	Pagsabog ng Sikreto	September 25, 2014	#PagsabogNgSikreto	15.1%	#1	#5	
69	Masakit na Katotohanan	September 26, 2014	#MasakitNaKatotohanan	14.8%	#1	#3	
70	Pighati ni Dading	September 29, 2014	#PighatiNiDading	13.7%	#1	#3	
71	Babawi si Celine	September 30, 2014	#BabawiSiCeline	14.2%	#1	#3	

=== October 2014 ===
Episode		Original air date	Social Media Hashtag	AGB Nielsen Mega Manila Households in Television Homes			Ref.
Episode		Original air date	Social Media Hashtag	Rating	Timeslot Rank	Daytime Rank	Ref.
72	Ang Pagbubunyag	October 1, 2014	#AngPagbubunyag	13.9%	#1	#5	
73	Laban ng Dalawang Ama	October 2, 2014	#LabanNgDalawangAma	15.0%	#1	#3	
74	Nawawala ang Mag-ama	October 3, 2014	#NawawalaAngMagAma	15.2%	#1	#3	
75	Unconditional Love	October 6, 2014	#UnconditionalLove	16.5%	#1	#3	
76	Paano na si Dading?	October 7, 2014	#PaanoNaSiDading	16.0%	#1	#4	
77	Sacrifice ni Dading	October 8, 2014	#SacrificeNiDading	17.5%	#1	#3	
78	A Painful Situation	October 9, 2014	#APainfulSituation	18.2%	#1	#3	
79	Huling Bonding	October 10, 2014	#DadingHulingBonding	20.6%	#1	#2	

Episodes notes
