= Holy Cross of Davao College =

Roman Catholic college in Davao City, Philippines

- Dalubhasaang Banal na Krus sa Davao (Filipino)
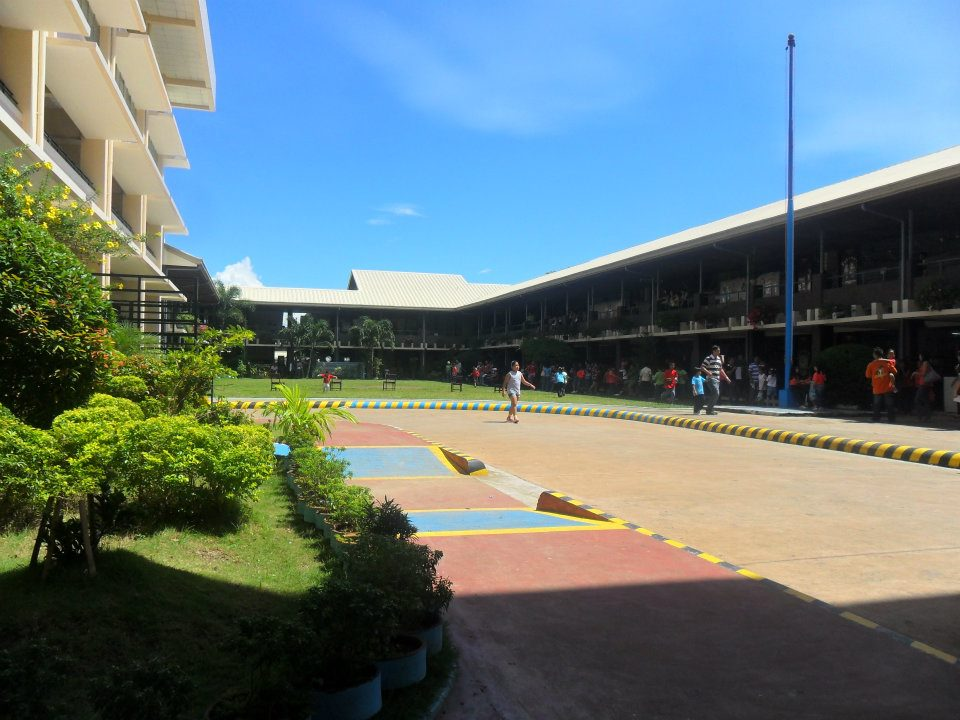
- Elementary grounds
- Former names: Holy Cross Academy of Davao (1955-1956); Holy Cross of Davao School (1956-1966)
- Motto: Ex Fide Ad Veritatem (Latin)
- Motto in English: From Faith to Truth
- Type: Private, Catholic Ceducational basic and higher education institution
- Established: 1951; 75 years ago
- Founder: Congregation of the Religious of the Virgin Mary
- Religious affiliation: Roman Catholic {Archdiocese of Davao)
- Academic affiliations: PAASCU
- Chairman: Most Rev.Romulo G. Valles, D.D.
- President: Bro.Noelvic H.Deloria, S.C.
- Vice-president: Teresa P. Fabiania (VP for Academic Affairs); Rommel F. Momo (VP for Operations}; Rev Fr. Emmanuel G. Calumpong (Corporate Treasurer)
- Location: Santa Ana Ave, Davao City, Davao del Sur, Philippines; 7°04′39″N 125°36′59″E
- Campus: Urban Main campus: Santa Ana Ave. Davao City (Undergraduate and Graduate Schools) Satellite campuses: Jose P.Laurel Avenue Davao City (Basic education units); Babak - Samal - Kaputian Rd, Kaputian, Island Garden City of Samal, Davao del Norte (undergraduate degrees)
- Colors: Red - White - Blue
- Website: www.hcdc.edu.ph

- Location in Mindanao Location in the Philippines

Holy Cross of Davao College (HCDC) is a Catholic private basic and higher education institution run by the Archdiocese of Davao in Davao City, Philippines. It was founded by the Congregation of the Religious of the Virgin Mary Sisters in 1951 and taken over by the Foreign Mission Society of Quebec (PME Fathers) in 1956. In 1978 the school was handed over to the Archdiocese of Davao. It is located in Davao City, Davao del Sur, Philippines.

It is currently divided into six units: the School of Humanities, Social Sciences and Communication, the School of Teacher Education, the School of Business and Management Education, the College of Engineering and Technology, the College of Maritime Education, and the College of Criminal Justice Education. It also runs grade school and high school units.

HCDC has three campuses, the Main Campus at Sta. Ana Avenue (which houses the Undergraduate, Graduate and Technical and Vocational Courses) and the JP. Laurel Avenue Campus (elementary and high school) - all located in the center of Davao City. The other one is located at Camudmud, Babak Island, Samal, which caters undergraduate programs only. HCDC also engages itself and the students into Community Extension Services.

== History ==
In school year 1951–1952, the Religious of the Virgin Mary Sisters opened an annex of the Immaculate Conception College along Santa Ana Avenue in Davao City. The annex was built upon the request of parents living at Sta. Ana District and with permission from the local bishop since the school building was erected on a land owned by the Roman Catholic Apostolic Administrator of Davao. The ICC annex provided kindergarten, elementary, and secondary courses for boys and girls. By school year 1955–1956, it became a separate school and was named the Holy Cross Academy of Davao.

In April 1956, the RVM Sisters informed the Most Rev. Clovis Thibault, of the Foreign Mission Society of Quebec also known as the PME Fathers, the first Apostolic Administrator and Bishop of Davao, about the RVM General Council's decision to transfer the ownership of the school. This decision was executed through a Deed of Absolute Sale in which the RVM Congregation, represented by Superior General Mother Maria Catalina Dychitan, sold the school building including “all that goes with the functioning of a school” to the Roman Catholic Apostolic Administrator of Davao.

The PME Fathers took over the school management in 1956–1957, with Rev. Fr. Jean Lalonde as the first school director and Rev. Fr. Leopold Charlesbois as assistant school director. The school was renamed Holy Cross of Davao School. When Fr. Lalonde left in 1959, Fr. Eloi Montambault, PME was appointed school director until Fr. Lalonde’s return in 1961. Fr. Lalonde served as school director until 1968.

In school year 1964–1965, the school allowed the admission of girls to the elementary department. College courses were offered in school year 1966–1967, and the school was renamed Holy Cross of Davao College.

In 1968, Rev. Fr. Generoso C. Camiña (the first Filipino PME and presently Bishop of Digos) was appointed Rector. He was succeeded by Emilio P. Palma Gil who was appointed school president on July 1, 1969. Due to the lack of Filipino personnel needed to operate the school, the PME Fathers decided to transfer the ownership of school buildings, including the CYO gymnasium, its furniture and equipment, and all the rights and privileges of operating a school, to the Roman Catholic Bishop of Davao. On July 10, 1976, a Canonical Deed of Donation was made between PME Regional Superior Rev. Fr. Roland Denies and Archbishop Antonio Ll. Mabutas, DD, J.C.D.

== Notable alumni ==
- Irha Mel Alfeche, beauty queen
- Bayang Barrios, musician
- Aljo Bendijo, broadcast journalist
- Pong Escobal, athlete
- Mohamad Paglas, politician
- Alex Santos, newscaster
- Manuel Zamora, politician
