= Miss Philippines Earth 2006 =

6th edition of the Miss Philippines Earth pageant

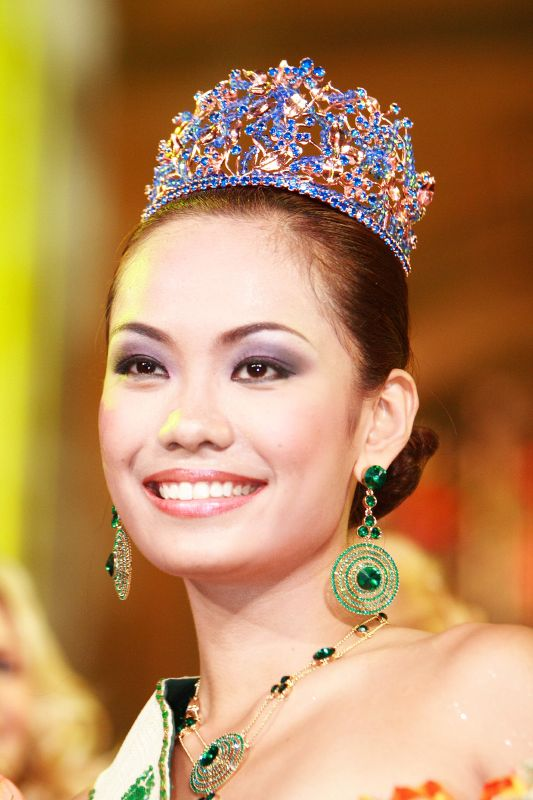
- Cathy Untalan
- Date: May 14, 2006
- Presenters: Piolo Pascual; Sam Milby; Derek Ramsay
- Venue: University of the Philippines Theater, Quezon City, Philippines
- Broadcaster: ABS-CBN; The Filipino Channel
- Entrants: 24
- Placements: 10
- Winner: Catherine Untalan; Metro Manila

Miss Philippines Earth 2006 was the sixth edition of the Miss Philippines Earth pageant. It was held on May 14, 2006 at the University of the Philippines Theater in Quezon City, Philippines.

The contest was won by Cathy Untalan, who was crowned by the previous winner, Genebelle Raagas. Untalan won against 23 other candidates and represented the Philippines at Miss Earth 2006. The event was broadcast by ABS-CBN Network in the Philippines and The Filipino Channel internationally.

== The pageant ==
The twenty-four candidates that competed for the title were formally presented at the poolside of Hotel Intercontinental in Makati on April 21, 2007. They introduced themselves and spoke about their environmental platforms to the media. Philippines regions and some Filipino communities abroad were represented by candidates who won in separate searches.

== Results ==
=== Placements ===
Placement	Contestant
Miss Philippines Earth 2006	Metro Manila – Catherine Untalan
Miss Philippines Air 2006	United States – Ginger Conejero
Miss Philippines Water 2006	Metro Manila – Katrina Grace Rigets
Miss Philippines Fire 2006	Central Luzon – Francis Dianne Cervantes
Miss Philippines Eco Tourism 2006	Canada – Reena Sarmiento
Top 10	Calabarzon – April Love Jordan; Cordillera – Iris Frances Tan; Metro Manila – Royce Anne Katrine Estella; Metro Manila – Stephanie Florence Magali; Southern Luzon – Faith Averie Mercadol

=== Special awards ===
- Gandang Ricky Reyes Award - #19 April Love Jordan
- Miss Golden Sunset Resort - #3 Francis Dianne Cervantes
- Best in Evening Gown - #12 Jacqueline Boquiron
- Best in Swimsuit - #4 Faith Averie Mercado
- Best in Cultural Attire - #9 Chrismin Anne Lim
- Miss Talent - #5 Arianne Veneracion
- Miss Photogenic - #24 Ginger Conejero
- Miss Friendship - #13 Andrea Dimalanta

== Candidates ==
The following is the list of the official contestants of Miss Philippines Earth 2005 representing various regions in the Philippines:

Contestant	Represented
#1 Iris Frances Lim Tan, 20, 5'6"	Cordillera Administrative Region
#2 Fatima Glenna Julian Cabilatazan, 20, 5'8"	Ilocos Region
#3 Francis Dianne Tolentino Cervantes, 24, 5'9"	Central Luzon Region
#4 Faith Averie Villamor Mercado, 19, 5'8"	Southern Luzon
#5 Arianne Mendoza Veneracion, 20, 5'6"	Bicol Region
#6 Jane Baruis, 20, 5'5.5"	Western Visayas Region
#7 Dyzsa Jagna, 22, 5'5"	Central Visayas Region
#8 Jonah Guzman, 23, 5'6"	Eastern Visayas Region
#9 Chrismin Anne Vismanos Lim, 21, 5'6.5"	Western Mindanao Region
#10 Dee Jay Valdevieso, 18, 5'6"	Northern Mindanao Region
#11 Maria Lourdes Almoite, 21, 5'6"	National Capital Region
#12 Jacqueline Gumabay Boquiron, 18, 5'7"	National Capital Region
#13 Andrea Fernando Dimalanta, 21, 5'7.5"	National Capital Region
#14 Royce Anne Katrine Go Estella, 19, 5'5.5"	National Capital Region
#15 Stephanie Florence Velasquez Magali, 23, 5'7.5"	National Capital Region
#16 Katrina Grace Guzman Rigets, 21, 5'5"	National Capital Region
#17 Irene Rose Santos, 22, 5'6.5"	National Capital Region
#18 Catherine Yu Untalan, 20, 6'	National Capital Region
#19 April Love Antolo Jordan, 18, 5'8"	Calabarzon
#20 Melanie Terides, 23, 5'7"	Filipino Community of Australia
#21 Reena Rae de Leon Sarmiento, 22, 5'6"	Filipino Community of Canada
#22 Rie Jorge Kojimoto, 18, 5'5"	Filipino Community of Japan
#23 Antisa Howitt, 18, 5'8"	Filipino Community of New Zealand
#24 Ginger Ann Abadiano Conejero, 22, 5'8"	Filipino Community of the United States

== See also ==
- Miss Earth 2005
