= Responde (TV program) =

Philippine television show

- Also known as: Responde sa Primetime (2026–present); Responde: Mata ng Mamamayan (2021–2025); Responde: Tugon, Aksyon, Ngayon (2011–19)
- Genre: Public Broadcasting
- Directed by: Jeannie Gualberto (2021–24); Blue Castro (since 2024)
- Presented by: Onin Miranda (2011–19); Arlyn Dela Cruz (2011–19); Alex Santos (2021–present)
- Country of origin: Philippines
- Original language: Filipino

Production
- Executive producer: Caesar Vallejos
- Production locations: EBC Bldg., #25 Central Avenue, New Era, Quezon City, Philippines
- Camera setup: Single-camera setup
- Running time: 60 minutes

Original release
- Network: Net 25
- Release: November 7, 2011 – present

Responde sa Primetime (transl. respondent on primetime; formerly known as Responde: Tugon, Aksyon, Ngayon and Responde: Mata ng Mamamayan) is a Philippine television public service show broadcast by Net 25. Originally hosted by Onin Miranda and Arlyn Dela Cruz, as Responde: Tugon Aksyon Ngayon aired of the network's evening line up from November 7, 2011 to July 31, 2019. Nelson Lubao served as the final host of the program's first incarnation.

The program returned on November 20, 2021, on the network's Weekends Prime lineup as Responde: Mata ng Mamamayan with Alex Santos currently serving as its program host.

The program is streaming online on YouTube.

== Hosts ==
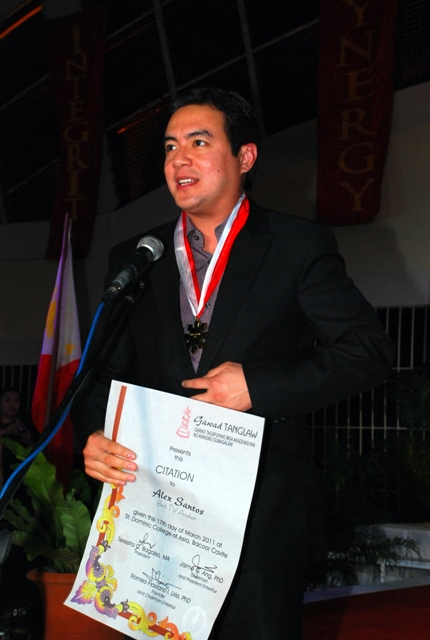
Alex Santos serves as a host.

- Alex Santos (since 2021)

Former hosts

- Onin Miranda (2011–18)
- Arlyn Dela Cruz (2011–13)
- Mavic Trinidad (2013–18)
- Nelson Lubao (2018–19)

== Radio program ==
Responde sa Radyo is a public service radio program aired Mondays to Fridays from 4:00 PM to 5:00 PM over DZEC 1062 Radyo Agila it was anchored by Alex Santos.

== See also ==
- List of NET25 original programming
