= PTV News Tonight =

Nightly newscast of People's Television Network

- Title card since 2020
- Genre: Newscast
- Created by: PTV News
- Directed by: Leo Docto
- Presented by: Charms Espina; Jing Jamlang
- Narrated by: Charms Espina
- Country of origin: Philippines
- Original language: English

Production
- Executive producer: Rizal Obanil
- Production locations: PTV Studio B, PIA-PTV Government Center, Quezon City
- Camera setup: Multi-camera setup
- Running time: 60 minutes

Original release
- Network: People's Television Network
- Release: September 7, 2020 – present

Related
- PTV News Headlines

PTV News Tonight is a Philippine television news broadcasting show broadcast by PTV. Originally anchored by Joee Guilas and Charms Espina, it premiered on September 7, 2020, replacing PTV News Headlines. Espina and Jing Jamlang currently serves as anchors. The newscast airs from Monday to Friday at 9:00 p.m. to 10:00 p.m. (PST) on PTV and its livestreaming channels.

== History ==
PTV News Tonight started airing as a daily nightly news program replacing PTV News Headlines, as part of programming changes in the network's news division. Originally slated for launch by August 3, 2020, the planned launch was suspended due to coronavirus infections in the PTV main office. This left the network airing hourly newsbreak PTV Balita Ngayon and the 6pm bulletin PTV News until disinfection operations and personnel recovery happened in September.

On August 19, 2026, Charms Espina became the sole anchor of the newscast.

== Anchors ==
=== Current ===
- Charms Espina (2020–present)
- Jing Jamlang (2026–present)

=== Former ===
- Joee Guilas (2020–23)
- Cathy Untalan (2021–22)
- Gab Bayan (Meet the Millennials and Pop Culture Corner, 2020–21)
- William Thio (2023–25)
- Monique Tuzon (2023–24)
- Shiela Salaysay (2024–25)
- Joshua Garcia (2025; Not to be confused with the same names)
- Jay Esteban (2025–26)

== See also ==
- List of programs broadcast by People's Television Network
- Ulat Bayan
