= Good Morning Pilipinas =

Defunct morning newscast of People's Television Network

- Title card as Good Morning Boss from 2013–16
- Genre: News program Magazine
- Directed by: Chito Cabatuando
- Presented by: Aljo Bendijo; Dianne Medina; Jules Guiang; Diane Querrer; Audrey Gorriceta; Karla Paderna; Carby Salvador
- Country of origin: Philippines
- Original language: Filipino

Production
- Executive producers: Rose Manalansang; Maria Besi Cruz-Valdes; Regine Celestre
- Production locations: PTV Studio A, Broadcast Complex, Visayas Avenue, Barangay Vasra, Diliman, Quezon City
- Camera setup: Multiple-camera setup
- Running time: 90–120 minutes

Original release
- Network: PTV
- Release: January 14, 2013 – July 8, 2016
- Release: May 1, 2000 – March 30, 2001
- Release: July 11, 2016 – May 5, 2017

Related
- Metro One; Daily Info Bagong Pilipinas

Good Morning Pilipinas (formerly Good Morning Boss) is a Philippine television news broadcasting show broadcast by NBN and PTV. Originally hosted by Mandy Ochoa, Tina Pamintuan, Candace Giron, Nikka Cleofe-Alejar, Mymy Davao and Lala Roque. It aired from May 1, 2000 to March 30, 2001, and was replaced by New Day @ PTV/NBN. The show returned from January 14, 2013 to May 5, 2017, replacing Metro One and was replaced by Daily Info and Bagong Pilipinas. Dianne Medina, Jules Guiang, Aljo Bendijo, Karla Paderna, Audrey Gorriceta, Carby Salvador and Diane Querrer served as the final host.

== Final hosts ==
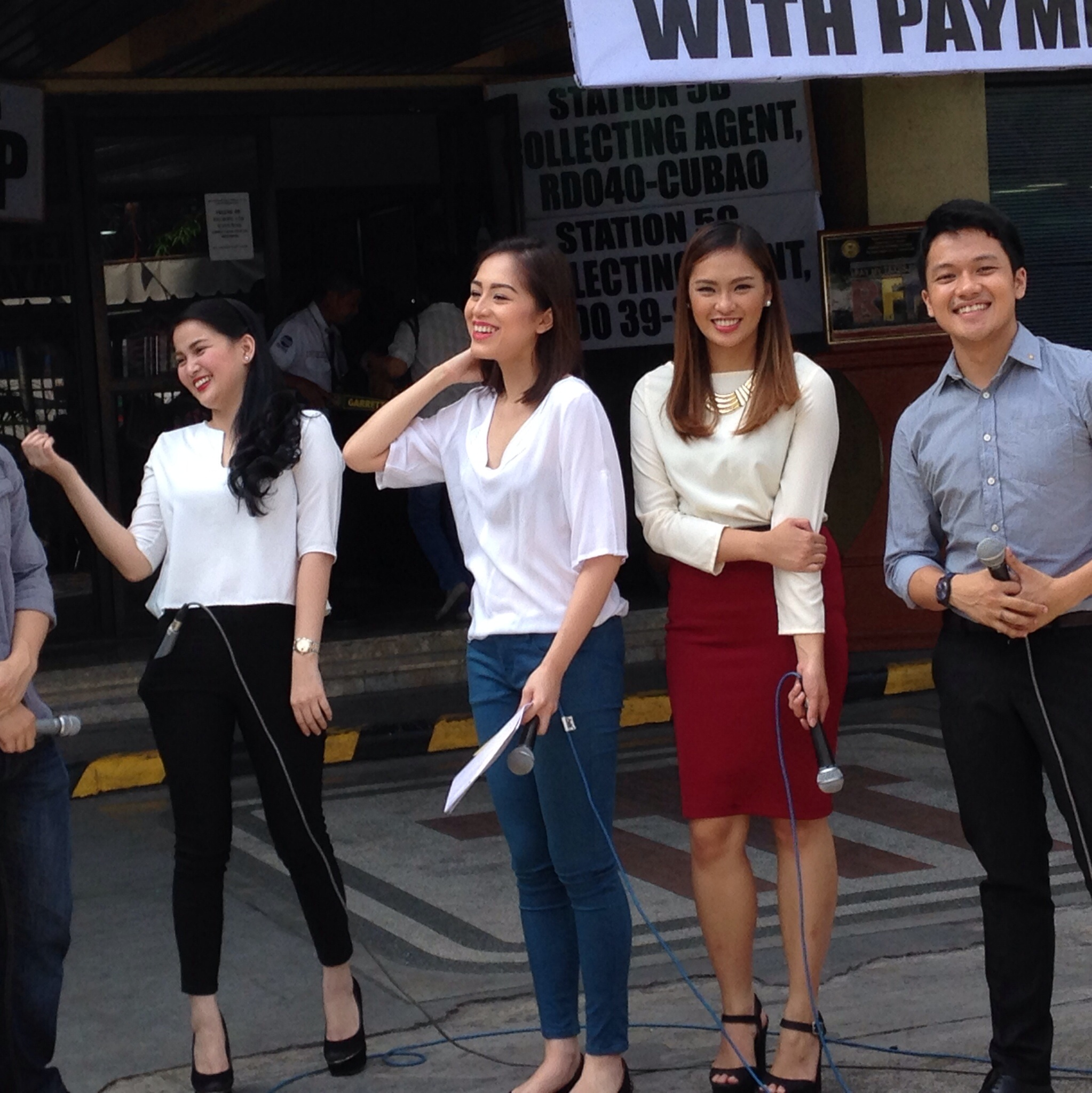
Hosts of Good Morning Boss (from R) Sandro Hermoso, Diane Medina, Carla Lizardo, Karla Paderna and Jules Guiang

- Audrey Gorriceta (2014–17)
- Dianne Medina (2013–17)
- Karla Paderna (2014–17)
- Jules Guiang (2013–17)
- Aljo Bendijo (2015–17)
- Diane Querrer (2016–17)

== Former hosts ==
As Good Morning Pilipinas

- Mandy Ochoa (2000–01)
- Nikka Cleofe-Alejar (2000–01)
- Tina Pamintuan (2000–01)
- Candace Giron (2000–01)
- Mymy Davao (2000–01)
- Lala Roque (2000–01)

As Good Morning Boss

- Catherine Vital (2013)
- Freddie Abando (2013–14)
- Toni Hipolito (2013)
- Kirby Cristobal (2013–14)
- Bryan Hafalla as Angas (2013–14)
- Carla Lizardo (2013–14)
- Jade Miguel (2014)
- Sandro Hermoso (2013–14)
- Hazel Ann Salubon (2013–14)
- Julius Disamburun (2014)

== Final segments ==
- Balitang Trending
- On the Spot
- Usapang SSS
- Mang Tanong
- At Your Service
- School Hopping
- Lifestyle
- Eat's Fun
- Atbp.
- ASEAN TV
- Dermaesthetique
- Reel Talk
- Entrepinoy
- Fifi of Fortune
- Traffic Update
- Price Watch
- I Love My Culture
- Special Feature
- Just 4 Kids
- Artsy Craftsy

== Awards ==
- Nominee, Best Morning Show, PMPC Star Awards for TV 2013 & 2014
- 2014 Anak TV Seal Award

== See also ==
- List of programs broadcast by People's Television Network
