= Alex Santos (newscaster) =

Filipino journalist (born 1970)

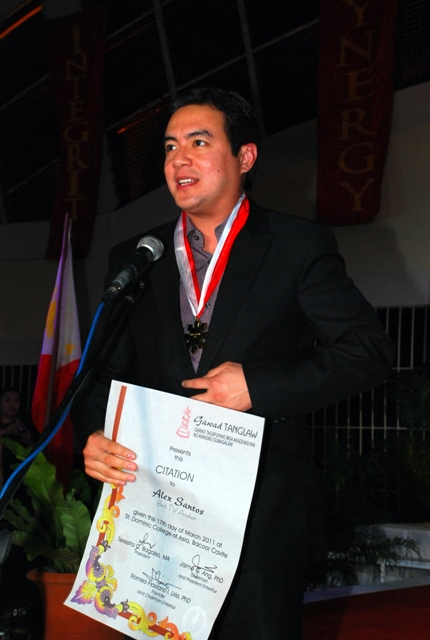
- Santos in 2011
- Born: Alexander Hidalgo Santos; June 10, 1970 (age 56); Davao City, Davao del Sur, Philippines
- Education: Ateneo de Davao University, (BS)
- Occupations: News Anchor, Reporter, Journalist, Host, Radio Commentator, News Director
- Employer(s): Net 25 (2021–present); PTV (2017–2021); Bitag Media Unlimited Inc. (2016–2018); Aliw Broadcasting Corporation (2014–2021); ABS-CBN (1992–2014)
- Spouse: Joanna Gómez
- Children: 3

Alexander "Alex" Hidalgo Santos (born June 10, 1970) is a Filipino field reporter who is currently a news and radio anchor for Net 25 and DZEC Radyo Agila. Santos was a former news director for DWIZ, and a former newscaster and television host for ABS-CBN, DZMM and PTV.

== Background ==
=== Education ===
Santos graduated elementary and high school from Holy Cross of Davao College, a private, Catholic institution in Davao City. He earned a Bachelor of Science degree from the Ateneo de Davao University.

== Career ==
=== Television career ===
Santos began his career as a television reporter and newsreader with TV Patrol Southern Mindanao (previously known as TV Patrol Mindanao) from 1992 to 1996. He also hosted a local variety show Alas Kwatro of ABS-CBN Davao. In 1996, he transferred to Metro Manila to become a news editor for regional affiliates of ABS-CBN Corporation's Sarimanok News Network (now ANC, the ABS-CBN News Channel), a position he held until 2006.

In 1998, Santos has been started his career as sportscaster and courtside reporter of the newly formed Metropolitan Basketball Association (a regional-professional basketball league), first as a sideline reporter during the MBA's maiden season in 1998, and later as a play-by-play commentator In 1999. The MBA has been produced by ABS-CBN Sports and covered on Studio 23.

At DZMM, he anchored the weekday edition of Radyo Patrol Balita: Alas Kuwatro also with Bernadette Sembrano (replaced Jasmin Romero in 2011) and All Aboard! Pinoy Abroad! with Maresciel Yao.

He began anchoring TV Patrol Weekend (then TV Patrol Sabado and TV Patrol Linggo) alongside Bernadette Sembrano on July 8, 2006, replacing Henry Omaga-Diaz and also Ces Oreña-Drilon going to late-night newscast of Bandila, and was later replaced by Alvin Elchico and Pinky Webb on November 26, 2011.

On June 25, 2007, he became a presenter on the morning show Umagang Kay Ganda. On February 28, 2009, he was one of the co-hosts of the investigative program XXX: Exklusibong, Explosibong, Exposé alongside Pinky Webb and Julius Babao, replacing Karen Davila and Henry Omaga-Diaz, and was later replaced by Anthony Taberna on June 28, 2010.

A year after, he left ABS-CBN, he would then serve as news director of DWIZ 882 kHz and a news anchor of PTV. He currently works with Net 25.

== Personal life ==
He is married to Joanna Gomez-Santos, Vice President for TV Production Operations of ABS-CBN Corporation, and together, they have three children.

== Filmography ==
=== Television and radio programs ===
Year	Title
2022–present	Mata ng Agila Primetime
2021–present	Responde
2020–2021	Ulat Bayan
2018–2019	Crime Desk
2017–2018	Sentro Balita
2017, 2018–2020	PTV News Nationwide
2016–2018	Kilos Pronto
2015–present	Ratsada Balita
2014–present	Columnist (Walang Sinasanto)
2014–present	Usapang GOCC, Serbisyong OGCC
2014	Kasangga Mo ang Langit sa IZ
2014–2022	IZ Balita Nationwide Umagang Edition (with Rey Langit)
2014–2022	IZ Balita Nationwide Tanghaling Edition (solo)
2011–2012	All Aboard, Pinoy Abroad
2007–2013	Umagang Kay Ganda
2006–2011	TV Patrol Sabado/Linggo/Weekend
2005–2013	Radyo Patrol Balita: Alas Kwatro
2011	Ang Hirap Matuto - An ABSCBN News and Current Affairs Special Report
2009–2010	XXX: Exklusibong, Explosibong, Exposé
2008	Upload 2008 - An ABS-CBN Yearend Special
2001–2007	The Basketball Show
2002	Kumikitang Kabuhayan
1998–2002	Metropolitan Basketball Association
1992–1996	TV Patrol Mindanao
