= Dianne Medina =

Filipino actress

Dianne Medina-Ilustre
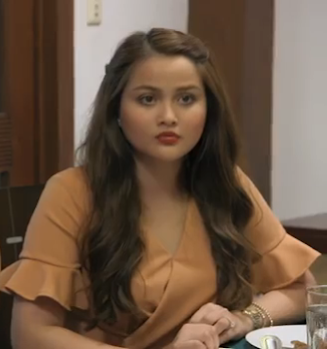
- Medina in 2017
- Born: Maria Patricia Dianne Perez Medina; November 5, 1986 (age 39); Manila, Philippines
- Education: Saint Theresa's College of Quezon City; Miriam College
- Occupations: Actress; model; dancer; television host; news anchor
- Years active: 2006–present
- Agent: Star Magic (2006–2010)
- Spouse: Rodjun Cruz (m. 2019)
- Children: 2
- Family: Maxine Medina (cousin)

Maria Patricia Dianne Perez Medina-Ilustre (born November 5, 1986) is a Filipino actress, dancer, television host, anchor and part-time model. Medina is also a former member of ABS-CBN's developmental talent agent Star Magic.

== Early life ==
Dianne Medina was born Maria Patricia Dianne Perez Medina, on November 5, 1986. In 1991, she studied elementary education at the Holy Spirit School in Cubao, Quezon City. In 2013, she graduated secondary school at Saint Theresa's College of Quezon City. She graduated with a Bachelor of Arts in communication from Miriam College.

== Career ==
=== 2006–2010: Early career ===
Medina was one of the 12 finalists of Wazzup Wazzup's 2006 Tadjock Search. After winning the search, she became a regular segment host of the satirical comedy news program and appeared as a guest host of Studio 23's morning news and talk show, Breakfast.

In 2007, she was cast as Dianne in the ABS-CBN sitcom, Let's Go, directed by Bobot Mortiz. She was personally offered by Johnny Manahan to join Star Magic after her guest performance in, the now defunct noontime variety show, Wowowee, another show directed by Mortiz. Medina was included in the 15 celebrity contestants of the second season of U Can Dance Version 2. She was also cast as Joy in the second season of Star Magic Presents: Abt Ur Luv —renamed Abt Ur Luv Ur Lyf 2. She made her film debut in the Star Cinema film A Love Story.

She was cast as Teena in the 2008 teen drama, Star Magic Presents: Astigs in Luvin' Lyf. She also made a special appearance in Komiks Presents: Tiny Tony. October of the same year, she was cast as a series regular in the sexy sketch comedy, Banana Split--a spin off of the '90s show Goin' Bananas. Earlier, she played Agatha in the fantasy drama Dyosa, her character was killed off the show due to her commitments to Banana Split. Her stint in Banana Split ended abruptly in 2008 when the management decided to reformat the program.

In 2009, Medina started appearing in TV5 shows, aside from her appearances in ABS-CBN. She was cast as one of the hosts of Flo, a teenage lifestyle program which aired for one season in TV5. She played Kat in Kambal sa Uma and had guest appearances in Your Song Presents: Boystown, Your Song Presents: Feb-ibig and Precious Hearts Romances Presents: Ang Lalaking Nagmahal Sa Akin. She joined the cast of TV5's gag show Lokomoko High in the middle of 2009. She also had a special participation in May Bukas Pa.

Medina was one of the cast members retained when Lokomoko High was revamped to Lokomoko U in 2010. She had a special participation in Habang May Buhay--a premier offering of the ABS-CBN's "60th celebration of Filipino Soap Opera" line up. She was cast as Chanel in TV5's afternoon teen drama, BFGF, and as a regular host and performer in the TV5 Sunday variety show, PO5. The same year, she made guest appearances in Midnight DJ, 5 Star Specials and Maynila. She also played supporting roles in the Star Cinema films: My Amnesia Girl, Miss You Like Crazy and Till My Heartaches End.

=== 2011–2014: Various TV appearances ===
In 2011, she played Beauty in TV5's Babaeng Hampaslupa, and later appeared in ABS-CBN's Kung Ako'y Iiwan Mo and Mundo Man ay Magunaw in 2012.

In 2013, Medina started a co-hosting PTV 4's Good Morning Pilipinas.

Medina appeared in Beautiful Strangers on GMA Network in 2015 including Eat Bulaga!.

== Personal life ==
In October 2017, Medina became engaged to actor Rodjun Cruz after dating since July 23, 2007. The couple married on December 21, 2019. On September 10, 2020, at 1:55 a.m., she gave birth to her first child, a son named Rodolfo Joaquin Diego III, who is enrolled in Nursery 2. On July 23, 2024, she gave birth to her second child, a daughter named Maria Isabella Elizabeth.

Former Miss Universe Philippines (2016) Maxine Medina is her cousin.

== Filmography ==
=== Television ===
| Year | Title | Role | Notes | Source |
|---|---|---|---|---|
| 2007 | Wazzup Wazzup | Herself | | |
| 2007 | Let's Go | Dianne | | |
| 2007 | U Can Dance Version 2 | Herself - Contestant | | |
| 2007 | Star Magic Presents: Abt Ur Luv Ur Lyf 2 | Joy | | |
| 2008 | Star Magic Presents: Astigs in Luvin' Lyf | Teena | | |
| 2008 | Komiks Presents: Tiny Tony | | | |
| 2008 | Maalaala Mo Kaya | Young Ning | Episode: "Dalandan" | |
| 2008 | Dyosa | Agatha | | |
| 2008 | Banana Split | Herself - Various roles | | |
| 2009 | Jim Fernandez's Kambal Sa Uma | Kat | | |
| 2009 | Maalaala Mo Kaya | Judith | Episode: "Pendant" | |
| 2009 | Your Song Presents: Open Arms | Lucy | | |
| 2009 | Your Song Presents: Boystown | Guest | | |
| 2009 | May Bukas Pa | Pam | | |
| 2009 | Lokomoko High | Herself - Various roles | | |
| 2009 | Precious Hearts Romances Presents: Ang Lalaking Nagmahal sa Akin | Nikki | | |
| 2010 | Habang May Buhay | Mara | | |
| 2010 | Lokomoko U | Herself - Various roles | | |
| 2010 | Midnight DJ | | Episode: "Bentilador na Matador" | |
| 2010 | BFGF | Chanel Ann Laguardia | | |
| 2010 | 5 Star Specials | Dorina Avila | | |
| 2010 | Maynila | Mia | Episode: "For The Search Of Love" | |
| 2010 | P.O.5 | Herself | | |
| 2010 | Midnight DJ | Tammy | Episode: "Ang Pangbabalik ng Babae sa Balete Drive" | |
| 2011 | Babaeng Hampaslupa | Beauty | | |
| 2011–2012 | The Jose and Wally Show Starring Vic Sotto | Tennessee | | |
| 2012 | Mundo Man ay Magunaw | Ramona La Peña | | |
| 2012 | Kung Ako'y Iiwan Mo | Sandra | | |
| 2012 | Wansapanataym | Cecile | Episode: "Ang Bagong Kampeon Sa Bagong Taon" | |
| 2013–2017 | Good Morning Pilipinas | Herself - Host | | |
| 2013–2017 2023–present | Siete Palabras | Herself - Host | | |
| 2013 | Kailangan Ko'y Ikaw | Sonia | | |
| 2013 | Maalaala Mo Kaya | Andrea | Episode: "Ilog" | |
| 2013 | Huwag Ka Lang Mawawala | Young Doña Helena Diomedes | | |
| 2013 | Maalaala Mo Kaya | Maida | Episode: "Pasa" | |
| 2014 | Honesto | Tanya | | |
| 2014 | Maalaala Mo Kaya | Cathy | Episode: "Bahay" | |
| 2014 | The Legal Wife | Tanya Tamayo | | |
| 2014 | Mirabella | Holly | | |
| 2014 | Ipaglaban Mo! | Eira Bianca Ignacio | Episode: "Umasa Ako Sa Hula" | |
| 2015 | Two Wives | Phoebe Sales | | |
| 2015 | Beautiful Strangers | Monica Aragon | | |
| 2016 | Little Nanay | Cindy Cruz | | |
| 2016 | Maynila | Marissa | Episode: "Sakripisyo" | |
| 2016 | Ipaglaban Mo! | Helga | Episode: "Witness" | |
| 2016 | Magpakailanman | Lourdes | Episode: "May Forever sa Bahay Pag-ibig" | |
| 2017 | My Love from the Star | Irish Libredo | | |
| 2017 | Road Trip | Herself - Guest | | |
| 2017–2020 | Bagong Pilipinas | Herself - Host | | |
| 2018–2019 | Bagong Bayani TV | Herself - Host | | |
| 2018 | Maalaala Mo Kaya | Barbie's sister | | |
| 2020 | Rise and Shine Pilipinas | Segment Host - TalkBiz | | |
| 2022 | Oh No! It's B.O (Biro Only) | Guest co-host | | |

=== Film ===
| Year | Title | Role | Notes | Source |
|---|---|---|---|---|
| 2007 | A Love Story | Camille | | |
| 2009 | Roommate from Hell | | | |
| 2010 | Miss You Like Crazy | Anette Samonte | | |
| 2010 | Till My Heartaches End | Lizette | | |
| 2010 | My Amnesia Girl | Jen | | |
| 2012 | Si Agimat, si Enteng Kabisote at si Ako | Dianne | | |
| 2013 | Bakit Hindi Ka Crush ng Crush Mo? | | | |
| 2013 | Call Center Girl | Claire Manlapat | | |
| 2014 | Dilim | Shelly | | |
| 2015 | Manila's Finest | Jenny Tiu | | |
| 2016 | The Story of Love | | | |
| 2016 | Barcelona: A Love Untold | Flor | | |
| 2017 | Tatlong Bibe | | | |
| 2017 | AWOL | Abel's wife | | |
| 2017 | Love Is... | Lara | Television film | |
| 2018 | My 2 Mommies | Karen Castillo | Supporting role | |
| 2019 | OFW: The Movie | | | |
| 2019 | The Annulment | | | |
| 2023 | Layas | | | |
