= Aljo Bendijo =

Filipino journalist (born 1974)

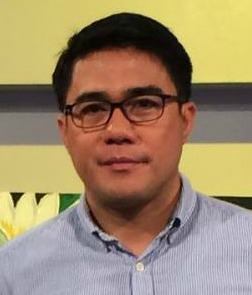
- Bendijo in February 2016
- Born: Alexes Joseph Rubia Bendijo (Note: Alternately spelled as Alexis Joseph Rubia Bendijo.); February 6, 1974 (age 52); Davao City, Philippines
- Education: Polytechnic University of the Philippines, Broadcast Communication (AB) Arellano University School of Law, Bachelor of Laws (LL.B.)
- Alma mater: University of Mindanao; University of Southeastern Philippines; Holy Cross of Davao College; Polytechnic University of the Philippines; Arellano University School of Law
- Occupations: Journalist, newscaster, radio commentator
- Years active: 1997–present
- Known for: TV Patrol Davao; Hoy Gising! Balitang K TV Patrol; Sapul Kayo Dyan! Alas Singko Y Medya; Magandang Umaga Bayan; Hataw Balita; NewsWatch Aksyon Balita; One Morning Cafe; Teledyaryo/Batingaw/Teledyaryo: Final Edition; Good Morning Pilipinas; News @ 6 Sonshine NewsBlast; Isyu at Batas; PTV News; RadyoBisyon; Ulat Bayan; Daily Info; Sentro Balita; Rise and Shine Pilipinas
- Spouse: Melanie F. Galita (m. 2012)
- Children: 2

Alexes Joseph "Aljo" Rubia Bendijo (Tagalog: [ˈaldʒɔ bɛnˈdiho]; born February 6, 1974) is a Filipino veteran broadcast journalist, radio commentator, and government official who currently serves as a Director II (Regional Director for Region 10) of the Land Transportation Franchising and Regulatory Board (LTFRB). He took his oath of office in February 2026 after being appointed to the Land Transportation Franchising and Regulatory Board by President Ferdinand "Bongbong" Marcos Jr. He now oversees implementation of the Public Transport Modernization Program (PTMP) and financial support for consolidated transport cooperatives in Northern Mindanao.

== Early life and education ==
Alexes Joseph Rubia Bendijo was born on February 6, 1974, in Davao City, and is the eldest of three children.

He finished elementary at the University of Mindanao. He finished high school at the University of Southeastern Philippines. He started out having part-time jobs as waiter and janitor while in college. He took up AB Mass Communication for two years at the Ateneo de Davao University before moving to Holy Cross of Davao College. He also obtained a degree in Broadcast Communication at Polytechnic University of the Philippines and pursued law at Arellano University School of Law in Pasay City where he earned his Bachelor of Laws degree (LL.B.) in 2016.

== Career ==
=== 1995–2004: ABS-CBN News career ===
Bendijo started his television career at ABS-CBN Regional Network Group's Davao station in 1995 while obtaining his college degree and hosted a public-service program on the station's regional radio station DXAB. He then became anchor of TV Patrol Mindanao with Girlie Balaba in 1997 following a reformat in the program. It was renamed TV Patrol Davao.

He then rose to national fame when he was first TV reporter in ABS-CBN Manila of Hoy Gising! on May 8, 2000. He was later named as one of the three new anchors of the network's flagship newscast TV Patrol beginning on March 12, 2001, a month after the first departure of its longtime anchor Noli de Castro. He was later given his own TV show, Sapul Kayo Diyan!, which aired every Saturday night. Aside from these three shows, Bendijo was also a remarkable field reporter of the News & Current Affairs Division.

He received the "Best New Male TV Personality" award at the 15th PMPC Star Awards for Television in 2001 and a KBP Golden Dove awardee for Best TV Newscaster in 2001. Following his anchor stint, he was named as one of the hosts of the morning show Magandang Umaga, Bayan (MUB) on March 5, 2002 as one of its newsreaders.

In 2003, he was not seen on TV Patrol for unknown reasons. Following this, the newscast underwent a reformat change adding Julius Babao to the roster, replacing him and Henry Omaga-Diaz. He left MUB also after a year, ending his 9-year career with ABS-CBN.

=== 2006–2007: Various TV appearances ===
Following his three-year hiatus from TV, Bendijo returned on air in 2006, anchoring Hataw Balita on UNTV. He later transferred to RPN, where he became one of the first anchors of RPN Action News (later became NewsWatch Aksyon Balita).

=== 2007–2012, 2015–present: Stint at People's Television Network (PTV) ===
After his stint at RPN and UNTV, Bendijo then moved to the government-owned NBN (now People's Television Network's or PTV). He became the main host of the morning show One Morning Cafe from 2007 to 2010. He anchored the primetime flagship newscast Teledyaryo from 2007 to 2008. He anchored the late-night flagship newscast Batingaw (which became Teledyaryo: Final Edition) from 2008 to 2012. In September 2015, he rejoined PTV's morning show Good Morning Boss as host and one of the main anchors of PTV's flagship news program News @ 6 now became an anchor of PTV News from 2015 to 2017 and returning on May 11, 2020 until it ended on September 4, 2020.

He hosted Isyu at Batas on DZAR. On September 12, 2016, Bendijo assumed as main anchor for RadyoBisyon, the national morning newscast of Media Ng Bayan aired live on PBS Radyo ng Bayan (now Radyo Pilipinas - Radyo Publiko), PTV, and IBC.

He also hosted Hamon-Bendijo, an issue-based commentary radio program also on Radyo ng Bayan 738 kHz, aired right after RadyoBisyon. He formerly anchored Radyo Pilipinas News Nationwide on Radyo Pilipinas. He currently hosts BIRADA BENDIJO, a news and commentary radio program, on Radyo Pilipinas - Radyo Publiko.

== Other activities ==
=== Business ventures ===
Aside from his anchor stint, Bendijo tried merchandise and retail business in Imus, Cavite. He also managed the band Sidecrash, which had been known as 12 Months to Pay. The band is composed of five members who are also Davaoeños.

== Public image ==
Bendijo was named as one of the Top 10 Cutest newsmen in the country by spot.ph. in 2010 and a KBP Golden Dove awardee for Best TV Newscaster in 2001.

== Personal life ==
Bendijo has been married to Melanie Galita-Bendijo of Metro Pacific Investments Corporation since 2012; they have two children.

== Filmography ==
=== Television ===
Year	Title	Role	Ref.
1997–2000	TV Patrol Davao	Anchor	
2000–2001	Hoy Gising!	Anchor/Host	
2001–2003	TV Patrol	Anchor	
2002–2004	Sapul Kayo Diyan!	Host	
2002–2004	Magandang Umaga, Bayan	Host	
2006	Hataw Balita	Anchor	
2006–2007	NewsWatch Aksyon Balita	Anchor	
2007–2010	One Morning Cafe	Host	
2007–2008	Teledyaryo	Anchor	
2008–2010	Batingaw	Anchor	
2010–2012	Teledyaryo: Final Edition	Anchor	
2015–2017	Good Morning Pilipinas	Host	
2015–2016	News @ 6	Anchor	
2016–2017; 2020	PTV News	Anchor	
2016–2017	The Breaking Point	Host	
2017, 2020–2022, 2023–2024	Ulat Bayan	Anchor	
2017–2018	Daily Info	Anchor	
2018–2020, 2022–2023, 2024–2026	Sentro Balita	Anchor	
2022–2023	Public Briefing: #LagingHandaPH	Anchor	
2020–2022	Rise and Shine Pilipinas	Host	

== Radio ==
Year	Title	Role	Reference
1997–2000	DXAB at your Service	Main Anchor	
2012–2016	Sonshine NewsBlast	Main Anchor	
2016–2017	RadyoBisyon	Main Anchor	
2017–2021	Radyo Pilipinas News Nationwide	Anchor	
2018–2022	Birada Bendijo	Anchor	
2021–2022	RMN News Nationwide	Anchor	
2023–present	Punto Asintado Reload	Anchor	
