= PTV Sports (TV program) =

Filipino TV series or program

- Also known as: Teledyaryo Sports (2006-2008, 2010-2012); NBN Sports (2008-2010)
- Genre: Sports news
- Created by: People's Television Network
- Directed by: Leo Docto; Gerard Dumasal
- Presented by: Jing Jamlang; Meg Siozon
- Original language: Filipino

Production
- Executive producers: Sabel Reyes; Rhey Piamonte; Keith Austria; Dada Hernandez
- Production locations: PTV Studio A, PIA-PTV Government Center, Quezon City
- Camera setup: Multi-camera setup
- Running time: 30–60 minutes

Original release
- Network: NBN/PTV
- Release: April 17, 2006 – present
- Network: IBC
- Release: August 29, 2022 – September 8, 2023
- Network: PTV Sports Network
- Release: November 18, 2024 – present

PTV Sports (formerly known as Teledyaryo Sports and NBN Sports) is a Philippine television sports news broadcasting show broadcast by NBN/PTV and PTV Sports Network. Originally anchored by Snow Badua and Jasmine Romero, it aired from April 17, 2006 to December 30, 2016. The show returned from October 16, 2017 to September 8, 2023 and returned since October 14, 2023. Jing Jam Lang and Meg Siozon currently serve as the anchors. The program airs from Monday to Friday at 8:00 a.m. to 9:00 a.m. (UTC +8). It also has a weekend sports magazine show aired every at 4:00 p.m. to 4:30 p.m. (UTC +8).

== History ==
It was first aired on April 17, 2006, as Teledyaryo Sports (renamed as NBN Sports on April 7, 2008 until it returned to its original name on August 9, 2010), and was initially hosted by Snow Badua together with Jasmin Romero and Saleema Refran as his co-hosts. It underwent changes and became the #1 sports program in the country.

On December 30, 2016, after its airing of the year-end special, it was later downgraded into a 5-minute segment of PTV News. Due to public demand and after a 10-month hiatus, the show returned to its original timeslot on October 16, 2017, and it is now aired for 30 minutes, and later underwent changes as they moved to the afternoon timeslot since August 13, 2018, due to the airing of Chinese drama serial Jimao.

Until the premiere of Sports Desk on Solar News Channel/9TV/CNN Philippines in 2012 and later on The Score on S+A in 2014, PTV Sports was the only FTA television sports news program in the Philippines.

From August 29, 2022 to September 8, 2023, PTV Sports is also simulcast on IBC weeknights at 7:30 pm-8 pm.

From September 11, 2023 to October 18, 2024, PTV Sports it was later downgraded into a 5-minute segment of Ulat Bayan as Ulat Sports.

== See also ==
- List of programs broadcast by People's Television Network
