= Rise and Shine Pilipinas =

Philippine morning newscast of People's Television Network

- Rise and Shine Pilipinas title card from 2020 to 2023
- Genre: News broadcasting; Talk show
- Created by: PTV News
- Directed by: Jose Chito Cabatuando
- Presented by: Diane Querrer; Alfonso "Fifi" delos Santos; Ice Martinez; Joshua Garcia; Jules Guiang
- Country of origin: Philippines
- Original language: Tagalog

Production
- Executive producers: Besi Cruz Valdez (OIC, Program Production Services)
- Production locations: PTV Studio B, PIA-PTV Government Center, Quezon City
- Camera setup: Multiple-camera setup
- Running time: 120 minutes
- Production company: People's Television Network

Original release
- Network: People's Television Network (2020-present); Intercontinental Broadcasting Corporation (2022-2026)
- Release: September 7, 2020 – present

Related
- One Morning Cafe; Bagong Pilipinas; Daily Info; Sentro Balita; Ulat Bayan; PTV News Tonight

Rise and Shine Pilipinas (transl. Rise and Shine Philippines) is a Philippine morning newscast on PTV, showcasing the latest news, inspiring features and up-to-date information to jumpstart the morning. Originally hosted by PTV newscasters Aljo Bendijo, Diane Querrer and Gab Bayan, it premiered on September 7, 2020, replacing Bagong Pilipinas and Daily Info. The program airs daily from Monday to Friday at 6:00 am to 8:00 am (PST) on PTV and its livestreaming channels. It was simulcast on IBC from September 12, 2022, to January 13, 2026.

Querrer, Alfonso "Fifi" delos Santos, Ice Martinez, Joshua Garcia, and Jules Guiang serve as the current main hosts.

== See also ==
- List of programs broadcast by People's Television Network
