= Cathy Untalan =

Filipino model, beauty pageant titleholder, and news anchor

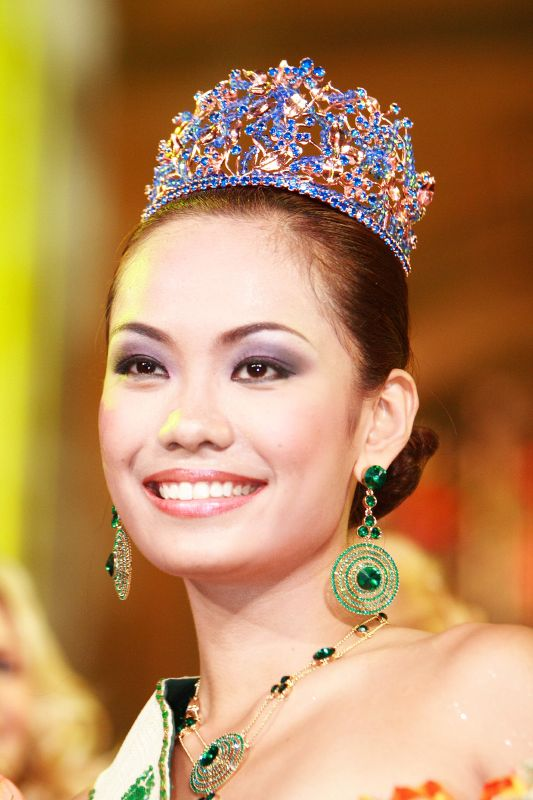
- Untalan in 2006
- Born: Catherine Yu Untalan; Manila, Philippines
- Education: University of the Philippines Diliman, (Psychology) University of the Philippines Open University, (Diploma)
- Height: 1.83 m (6 ft 0 in)
- Beauty pageant titleholder
- Title: Miss Philippines Earth 2006; Miss Earth – Water 2006
- Hair color: Black
- Eye color: Brown
- Major competitions: Miss Philippines Earth 2006 (Winner); Miss Earth 2006 (2nd Runner-up / Miss Water)

Catherine "Cathy" Yu Untalan is a Filipina TV anchor and beauty pageant titleholder. She won Miss Philippines-Earth 2006 and the international Miss Earth Water 2006. She is the executive director of the Miss Earth Foundation, the environmental-social-humanitarian outreach arm of Miss Earth beauty pageant. She is a TV anchor at People's Television Network in the Philippines.

== Background ==
Untalan finished her high school education at St. Paul College of Parañaque. She graduated cum laude in psychology at the University of the Philippines Diliman and received her master's degree in Environment and Natural Resource Management from the University of the Philippines Open University.

On August 18, 2006, she cohosted the awards night of Moonrise Film Festival, an annual film festival covering various environmental and cultural issues, sponsored by the Center for Environmental Awareness and Education, which was held at the Gateway Mall in Cubao, Quezon City.

She was a courtside reporter for the San Beda Red Lions during the first half of the 82nd season of the National Collegiate Athletic Association. Two years later, she became the courtside reporter for her alma mater's team, the UP Fighting Maroons during the University Athletic Association of the Philippines' 67th season.

She is the spokesperson of the Philippine Department of Environment and Natural Resources for various campaigns and of the Philippine Department of Health for their anti-tobacco smoking campaign. The Sustainable Energy Development Program of the United States Agency for International Development (USAID) also chose her to be the spokesperson of their biofuels campaigns. The USAID cited her efforts and participation in their programs and she was awarded an environmental ambassador recognition, the first to be given such distinction by the agency. She hosted a show in NBN Channel 4 entitled Kapihan ng Bayan with veteran broadcast journalists, Mario Garcia and Ely Saludar. She went on to anchor PTV News with Charms Espina and Richmond Cruz as late-night and with Alex Santos as primetime, Ulat Bayan with Aljo Bendijo and PTV News Tonight with Espina and Joee Guilas. She also hosted radio shows on DZRH. She used to be a columnist in the first green lifestyle magazine in the Philippines, called, Gen G Magazine.

== Beauty pageants ==
She was crowned Miss Philippines Earth 2006, and represented the Philippines at Miss Earth 2006, where she won Miss Water (second runner-up).

Preceded by Gennebelle Raagas	Miss Philippines-Earth; 2006	Succeeded by Jeanne Harn
Preceded by (Poland) Katarzyna Borowicz	Miss Earth-Water; 2006	Succeeded by (Venezuela) Silvana Santaella
