= List of programs broadcast by People's Television Network =

People's Television Network (PTV) is a government television network owned by the Government of the Philippines and the main brand of People's Television Network, Inc. (PTNI), one of the attached agencies under the Presidential Communications Office (PCO). It is headquartered in Broadcast Complex, Visayas Avenue, Diliman, Quezon City. The following is a list of all television programming that PTV is currently broadcasting since it began its television operations in 1974.

== Current local programming ==
Note: Titles are listed in alphabetical order followed by the year of debut in parentheses.

=== Newscasts ===
- PTV News Tonight (2020)
- Rise and Shine Pilipinas (2020)
- Sentro Balita (2017)
- Sentro Balita Weekend (2022)
- Ulat Bayan (2017; simulcast on Radyo Pilipinas and Capital 104.3)
- Ulat Bayan Weekend (2017, 2020; simulcast on Radyo Pilipinas, Sports Radio 918 and Capital 104.3)

=== Public service ===
- Bagong Pilipinas Ngayon (2023; simulcast on Radyo Pilipinas and Capital 104.3)

=== Public affairs ===
- Iskoolmates (2015)
- Larry Gadon Live (2024)

=== Kids-oriented ===
- Artsy Craftsy (2024)

=== Sports ===
- PTV Sports (2006–2016, 2017–2023, 2023; simulcast on PTV Sports Network)

== PTV Sports Network programs ==
- Sharks Billiards Association (2024)

== See also ==
- People's Television Network
- List of Philippine television shows
