= List of programs broadcast by Studio 23 =

Below is a partial list of shows that were previously aired in Studio 23, a defunct Philippine television network.

For the final shows on ABS-CBN Sports and Action, see List of programs broadcast by ABS-CBN Sports and Action.

== Local defunct shows ==
- 6underground Live & Raw (2008–09)
- Agri Business: How It Works (2013–14)
- ANC Presents: Harapan 2013 (2013)
- Ang Boyfriend Ko (2003–04)
- Ano bang Trip Mo? (2007–08)
- Asenso Pinoy (2013–14)
- Asian Formula 3
- Auto Extreme
- ASAP (2003) (simulcast from ABS-CBN; now airing on Kapamilya Channel, A2Z, All TV, Jeepney TV, Metro Channel and TV5)
- Badminton Extreme (2005–08)
- Balitang Bayan: Halalan 2013 (2013)
- Barkada Nights (2002–09, 2010–14)
- Barkada Nights Plus (2004–09)
- Barkada Trip (2004–09)
- Behind the Brand: The Philippine Fashion Week TV
- Belo Beauty 101 (2008–09)
- Bilis Balita (2011–14)
- Bites & Beyond (2010)
- Biyaheng Bulilit (2010–14)
- BKTV
- BLOG (Barkada Log)
- Breakfast (1999–2007)
- Career Jam: Served with Bread n' Butter
- Channel Club Kids
- Chef's on the Go
- Chismix
- Chooks to Go Sayaw Fever: The Php 1M Chicken Dance Showdown
- Citiline (1999–2003)
- Crissa Digital Dance Synergy Year 8 (2013)
- Da Adventures of Pedro Penduko
- Digital Photo Plus
- Digital Tour (1999–2007)
- Dos por Dos (2010–12)
- Dream Date
- 3oW PoWHz (Eow Powhz - Hello Po) (2010–11)
- EsKWELAHAN ni Ryan Bang (2011–13)
- ETZ (Eco Travel Zone) (2010–11)
- Everybody Can Cook (2008–09)
- F! (2003–06)
- Family Rosary Crusade (2003–14)
- Field Trip (2006–07)
- Filipino Poker Tour
- FPJ: Ang Nag-iisang Alamat (2013–14) (also as FPJ: Hari ng Pelikula)
- Friends Again (2008–14)
- Gag Ito! (2006–07)
- Gag U! (2012–14)
- Gameday Weekend with Rexona (2013)
- Game Plan (1999–2007)
- Generation RX (2009–14)
- Good Times with Mo (2008)
- Gourmet Everyday
- Guide to Urban Living (2000–02)
- Gusto Ko Maging Beauty Queen
- Hardcore Brothers Easy Ride
- Healing Mass for the Homebound with Fr. Mario Sobrejuanite (produced by Rivers of Living Water Catholic Community) (2008–14)
- Health Republic
- Hotwire
- How 'Bout My Place
- I Got It! (2010–13)
- Iba-Balita (2010–14)
- Iba-Balita Ngayon (2011–12)
- Idol (2013, produced by ALA Promotions)
- In Fitness & in Health
- It's a Guy Thing (2006–07)
- It's Showtime (2012) (simulcast from ABS-CBN; now airing on Kapamilya Channel, A2Z, All TV and GMA Network)
- Jeepney TV (2013–14) (discontinued; now broadcast on 24/7 cable with some of its programs were simulcast with Kapamilya Channel, A2Z and All TV)
  - Abangan ang Susunod Na Kabanata
  - Arriba, Arriba!
  - Bida si Mister, Bida si Misis
  - Chika Chika Chicks
  - Goin' Bananas
  - Home Along Da Riles
  - OK Fine Whatever
  - Oki Doki Doc
  - Pwedeng Pwede
  - Super Laff-In
  - Whattamen
- Jobs TV
- K-High (2010–13)
- Kabarkada, Break the Bank (2007)
- Kidz Rule (2005–09)
- Kiss the Cook (2003–04)
- Lactacyd CofiDance Hip-Hop Challenge (2010)
- Lactacyd CofiDance Mash-Up (2011)
- Lactacyd Confidence Confidance Mash-Up 2012 (2012)
- Life Without Borders with Cory Quirino
- Look Who's Cooking
- Lunch Box Office (2003–14)
- M. U. on Studio 23 (2011)
- Man and Machine (2008–09)
- Mano-Mano ni Anthony Taberna (2012–13)
- Masayang Tanghali Bayan (2003) (simulcast from ABS-CBN)
- Mashita Masarap
- Math-Tinik
- Melason: In Love & Promdi Heart (2009)
- Men's Room
- MOG TV
- Moms on the Go
- My Girl: One More Time
- MTV Asia (1996–2001)
- Myx (2001–14) (discontinued; now broadcast on 24/7 cable, and ABS-CBN TV Plus on July 30, 2018, until June 30, 2020)
- NCAA Games (Basketball & Volleyball) (2002–11)
- News 23 (1996–98)
- News Bites (2010–11)
- News Central (1998–2010)
- News Central Morning Edition (2005–06)
- News Central Update (1998–2007)
- Nginiiig: Paranormal Investigation (2004–06)
- O Shopping (2013–14)
- On CAM: Kabalikat
- Only in Pinas
- Pabida Ka! (2010–11)
- Pamana
- Paradigm Chef
- Pedro Penduko at ang Mga Engkantao
- Pet Ko! (2005)
- Philippine Realty TV
- Pilipinas Got Talent (2010)
- Pinoy Big Brother: Season 1 on Studio 23 (2005)
- Pinoy Big Brother: Season 2 on Studio 23 (2006)
- Pinoy Big Brother Celebrity Edition 1 on Studio 23 (2006)
- Pinoy Big Brother Celebrity Edition 2 on Studio 23 (2007–08)
- Pinoy Big Brother Double Up: Primetime Weekends (2009–10)
- Pinoy Big Brother Double Up: Raw Daily Exclusives on Studio 23 (2009–10)
- Pinoy Big Brother Teen Clash 2010: Live Feeds (2010)
- Pinoy Big Brother Teen Edition on Studio 23 (2006, 2008)
- Pinoy Dream Academy on Studio 23 (2006)
- Pinoy Dream Academy season 2 Live Streaming (2008)
- Pinoy Fear Factor: Special Edition (2008–09)
- Pinoy Sports Idols
- Pinoy T.A.L.K.
- Points of View (1998–2002)
- Promdi Chef
- Punchtime
- Quick-E (2009–10)
- Radyo Patrol Balita Alas-Siyete (2010–11)
- Reality World
- Rivermaya: Bagong Liwanag (2007)
- Royal Tru Orange Kulitada in Dopple Trouble (2013)
- Rush TV: Atin 'to! (2007–08)
- S.O.C.O.: Scene of the Crime Operatives (2010–11)
- Sabado Boys
- Sabong TV (2011–14)
- Sagupaan (2011–14)
- Samsung NCAA College Hoops
- Samsung UAAP Sports Center
- San Miguel Purefoods: Kwentong Kusina, Kwentong Buhay (2013)
- SBX: Super Barkadahan Exclusive
- Sel-J Sports: Motorcross TV (2011–14)
- Sine'skwela (2007–09)
- Slipstream
- Sparkada Trip (together with Chevrolet, 2011)
- Spirits
- Sports Bites (2010–11)
- Sports Kidz
- Sports Report
- Sports TV
- Sports U (2011)
- Star Cinema Presents (2013)
- Stoplight TV
- Strangebrew (2001–03)
- Studio 23 News Update (2007–10)
- Studio 23 Presents (1996–2014)
- Sunday LBO (2003–14)
- Sunday Night Blockbusters (1996–2009)
- Super Inggo (2012–13)
- Supermodel
- T.A.G. Show
- Tablescapes... Life on a Plate
- Taekwondo TV (2006–10)
- TalkActive TV with Kate Galang Coseteng
- Tanduay Rhum on the Rock
- Team Explorer
- The 700 Club Asia (2003–06)
- The Bottomline with Boy Abunda
- The Cory Quirino Show
- The Explorer
- The Good Life with Cory Quirino
- The Word Exposed with Luis Antonio Cardinal Tagle (2011–14)
- The Wrap (2010–11)
- This is Life with Cory Quirino
- Thumbs Up! (2011–14)
- Thunderbird Sabong Nation (2013–14)
- TM Rapublika Battle (2012–13)
- Travel Time (1999–2007)
- TV Patrol (2003) (simulcast from ABS-CBN; now airing on Kapamilya Channel, A2Z, All TV, ANC, DZMM TeleRadyo and PRTV Prime Media)
- UAAP on Studio 23 (2000–14)
  - Men's Basketball
  - Women's Basketball
  - Boys' Basketball
  - Men's Football
  - Men's Volleyball
  - Women's Volleyball
  - Men's Softball/Baseball
  - Badminton
  - Tennis
- Us Girls (2006–12)
- Usapang Lalake (2010–12)
- Vice Ink
- Wazzup Wazzup (2004–07)
- WCG TV
- Welcome Home
- What Would You Do?
- Where's Tony?
- Why Not! (2010–13)
- Value Vision (1996–2005)
- WOW - What's on Weekend
- XXX: Exklusibong, Explosibong, Exposé (2010–11)
- Y Speak (2005–10)
- Yamaha SZ16 Adventure Challenge (2013)
- Yamaha Yey! (2010–11)

== Foreign defunct shows ==
=== American ===
- 24
- 7th Heaven
- 90210 (seasons 1 and 2)
- Accidentally on Purpose
- Alias (2003–13)
- America's Next Top Model (cycles 1-4)
- Andromeda
- Angel
- Are You Afraid of the Dark?
- Armor of God
- Batman
- Baywatch (seasons 6 to 11)
- Bette
- Beverly Hills, 90210 (seasons 6-10)
- Bewitched
- Born Free
- Boston Common
- Boston Public
- Brooklyn South
- Brothers & Sisters (seasons 1 to 4)
- Buffy the Vampire Slayer
- Caroline in the City
- Castle (season 1)
- Charmed
- Cheerleader Nation
- Combat Missions
- Criminal Minds (seasons 1 and 2)
- CSI: Crime Scene Investigation (2005–14) (seasons 1 to 11)
- D.E.A.
- Dark Angel
- Dark Skies
- Dating Game
- Dawson's Creek (1998–2005)
- Days of Our Lives
- Desperate Housewives
- Dirty Sexy Money
- Early Edition
- EZ Streets
- Fallen
- Famous Crime Scene
- Fantasy Island
- Fastlane
- Fear Itself
- FightBox
- Fist of Zen (2012)
- Flash Forward
- Flash Gordon
- Flipper
- Frasier (2008)
- Future Quest
- Ghost Hunters
- Ghost Whisperer
- Gilmore Girls
- Goosebumps
- Grey's Anatomy (seasons 1 to 8)
- Hang Time
- Harper's Island
- Highlander: The Series
- I Dream of Jeannie
- Inside Edition
- Jack & Bobby
- Jack & Jill
- Joey
- Just Shoot Me!
- Justice
- Kid Nation
- Kindred: The Embraced
- Kyle XY
- Las Vegas
- Late Show with David Letterman
- Legend of the Seeker
- Life as We Know It
- Living with Fran
- Lost
- Love Boat: The Next Wave
- Mad About You
- Meet the Marks
- Melrose Place (seasons 4-7)
- Missing
- Monster Jam
- Murphy Brown
- MTV Asia
- Murder
- My So-Called Life
- NCIS
- NCIS: Los Angeles (2010–14) (seasons 1 to 3)
- Newlywed Game
- Night Visions
- Night Stand with Dick Dietrick
- Nitro Circus (2012)
- No Ordinary Family
- Northern Exposure
- Nowhere Man
- Numbers
- Off the Map
- Once Upon a Time (season 1)
- Party of Five
- Pearl
- Pinks All Out
- Playing It Straight
- Point Pleasant
- Popular
- Power Rangers series (1997–98; 2009–14)
  - Power Rangers Mystic Force
  - Power Rangers Operation Overdrive
  - Power Rangers Jungle Fury
  - Power Rangers RPM
  - Power Rangers Samurai
  - Power Rangers Turbo
  - Power Rangers Zeo
- Primetime Crime
- Private Practice
- Reaper
- ReGenesis
- Reel Deal (2005–14) (Movie in the Making)
- Relativity
- Revenge (2013–14)
- Rules of Engagement
- Samantha Who?
- Savannah
- Saved by the Bell
- Scandal (2013–14)
- Scrubs
- She's Got the Look (season 1)
- Smallville (2002–10)
- Smart Guy
- Snoops
- Something So Right
- Spin City
- Stacked
- Stargate Atlantis
- Sunset Beach
- Supernatural (seasons 1 to 6)
- Survivor: Africa (2001–02)
- Survivor: All-Stars (2004)
- Survivor: Borneo (2000)
- Survivor: Cook Islands (2006)
- Survivor: Guatemala (2005)
- Survivor: Marquesas (2002)
- Survivor: Palau (2005)
- Survivor: Panama (2006)
- Survivor: Pearl Islands (2003)
- Survivor: Thailand (2002)
- Survivor: The Amazon (2003)
- Survivor: The Australian Outback (2001)
- Survivor: Vanuatu (2004)
- The 4400
- The Agency
- The Amazing Race (Seasons 3–18) (2003–11)
- The Bachelor
- The Bachelorette
- The Big Easy
- The Century
- The Contender
- The District
- The Doctors
- The Green Hornet
- The Journey of Allen Strange
- The Key of David
- The Lost Room
- The Nanny (1996–2001)
- The Oprah Winfrey Show (1996–2010)
- The Others
- The River
- The Secret World of Alex Mack
- The Swan
- The Three Stooges
- The Twilight Zone
- The Voice (US; season 2)
- The West Wing
- The X Factor (seasons 1–3)
- The X-Files
- Thieves
- Timecop
- Time of Your Life
- Top of the Pops
- Tru Calling
- Two and a Half Men
- Two of a Kind
- U.C. Undercover
- Ugly Betty
- USA High
- Vanished
- Veronica's Closet
- Wasteland
- Will & Grace
- Wishbone
- World's Craziest Videos
- World's Wildest Police Videos
- Worst Week
- Young Americans

=== British ===
- Doctor Who
- Mr. Bean (1996–97, 2003–05)
- Top Gear

=== Asian ===
- Asia's Next Top Model (season 1) (2012–13; moved to TV5 in 2014 and then GMA Network in 2015; returned to TV5 in 2016)
- Boys Over Flowers (2010)
- Butterfly Fly Fly
- Chu, Chu, My Daddy
- Dream
- Dream High
- Fireworks
- Football Asia
- Forbidden Love
- Four Sisters
- Green Rose
- Heartstrings (2012)
- He's Beautiful
- Honey and Clover
- Hot Shot
- I Am Legend
- I Survived a Japanese Game Show
- It Started with a Kiss
- KO One
- Love at First Fight
- Love in the City
- Lovers
- Marry Me, Mary!
- Masked Rider Ryuki
- Mischievous Princess
- Miss No Good
- My Girl
- My Girlfriend Is a Gumiho
- My Princess
- Only You
- Perfect Match (2012)
- Precious Time
- Prince Hours
- Princess Hours
- Princess Lulu
- Rolling Love
- Romantic Princess
- Save the Last Dance for Me
- Smile Again
- Something About 1%
- Spring Waltz
- Summer x Summer
- Sungkyunkwan Scandal
- Sunshine of Love
- The Biggest Loser Asia
- The Kitchen Musical (2011)
- Three Brothers
- Three Dads with One Mommy
- The Truth
- The X-Family
- They Kiss Again
- Ultraman Max
- Ultraman Mebius
- Which Star Are You From
- White Tower
- Why Why Love

== Animated defunct series ==
=== Western animation, Chinese animation and Japanese anime ===
- 6teen (season 1 only)
- A.T.O.M. (2012)
- Akazukin Chacha (2007 redubbed)
- Akuei & Gatchinpo
- Angelic Layer
- Ani-Yoko
- Astro Boy
- BakéGyamon
- Barkada Trip
- Batman: The Animated Series
- Batman Beyond
- Beyblade series
  - Beyblade
  - Beyblade G-Revolution
  - Beyblade V-Force
- Blood+
- Blue Dragon (2012)
- Casper
- Chaotic
- Cinderella
- Code Geass
- Cooking Master Boy
- Cuore
- Dear Boys
- Death Note
- Dexter's Laboratory
- Digimon series
  - Digimon Adventures
  - Digimon Frontier
  - Digimon Savers (also known as Digimon Data Squad)
  - Digimon Tamers
- Dragon Booster
- Duel Masters
- Enigma
- Eureka Seven
- Eyeshield 21 (seasons 1 and 2)
- Fairy Musketeers
- Fairy Tale Police District
- Fantastic Children
- Fantastic Four
- Futurama
- Galaxy Racers
- Gallery Fake (2011)
- GetBackers
- Gun X Sword
- Gundam Seed
- Gundam Seed Destiny
- Gunparade March
- Hey Joel
- His & Her Circumstances (known as Tales at North Hills High)
- Hitman Reborn! (2011–13)
- Hoyt 'n Andy's Sportsbender
- Huckleberry Finn Monogatari (known as Adventures of Huck Finn, 1994 version)
- Huntik: Secrets & Seekers
- Inuyasha
- Invasion America
- Justice League
- Justice League Unlimited
- Kiba
- Kirarin Revolution
- Les Misérables: Shōjo Cosette
- Little Amadeus
- Little Women
- Looney Tunes (2012–14; from Radio Philippines Network)
- Madeline
- Magical Girl Lyrical Nanoha
  - Magical Girl Lyrical Nanoha
  - Magical Girl Lyrical Nanoha A's
  - Magical Girl Lyrical Nanoha Strikers
- MÄR (season 1 only)
- Marcelino Pan y Vino
- MetaJets (2010)
- Mina and Porfy
- Monster Allergy
- Monster by Mistake
- Mr. Bean: The Animated Series (2003–06)
- My Bride Is a Mermaid
- Naruto
- Naruto: Shippuden
- Negima! (the XEBEC version)
- Negima!? (the SHAFT version)
- Night Hood
- No Basket
- Odd Job Jack
- Paprika (Film)
- Postman Pat
- Princess Resurrection
- Pucca
- Rave Master
- Robin Hood no Daibōken
- Samurai X (1998–2000, re-run, 2003, 2008–2011, 2012)
- Sakura Wars
- Samurai Deeper Kyo
- School Rumble (seasons 1 and 2)
- Si Mary at ang Lihim ng Hardin
- Skyland
- Snow White
- Soul Eater
- Spider-Man: The Animated Series (1994)
- Supa Strikas
- Superman: The Animated Series
- Swirl Fighter
- Teen Titans
- Teenage Mutant Ninja Turtles
- Teenage Mutant Ninja Turtles: Fast Forward
- The Adventures of Peter Pan (2007 redubbed)
- The Batman
- The Harveytoons Show
- The Wrong Coast
- Thomas & Friends (season 12) (2013–14)
- Tom and Jerry (from IBC and RPN)
- Transformers: Cybertron (2007)
- Winx Club (season 3)
- W.I.T.C.H. (2012)
- Wolverine and the X-Men (2010)
- X-Men (2012–2013)
- X-Men: The Animated Series (1999–2003)
- X-Men: Evolution
- Xiaolin Showdown
- You're Under Arrest (Season 1; incomplete)
- Yu-Gi-Oh! Duel Monsters
- Yu-Gi-Oh! GX (season 1)
- Yu-Gi-Oh! 5D's
- Zenki
- Zoids: Genesis

=== Nickelodeon ===
- Back at the Barnyard (2012–14)
- CatDog*
- Catscratch
- ChalkZone*
- Danny Phantom*
- Dora the Explorer* (2013–14)
- Rocko's Modern Life*
- Rugrats (2001–04)
- SpongeBob SquarePants** (2003–05)
- The Adventures of Jimmy Neutron, Boy Genius**
- Wonder Pets! (2010–14)

(*) - with Nickelodeon on Studio 23 Block and dubbed in Tagalog-language audio

(**) - Later on ABS-CBN until 2020

== Sports shows and specials ==
- 10th IDBF World Dragon Boat Championship (October 2011)
- 14th IAAF World Championship Moscow (August 2013)
- 16th Asian Women's Volleyball Championship (2012)
- 2005 Southeast Asian Games (November 27 – December 5, 2005)
- 2007 Boxing World Cup (Philippines vs. Mexico)
- 2010 FIFA World Cup (June 13 – July 12, 2010) (licensed broadcaster, together with Balls)
- 2011 French Open Finals Highlights (July 1, 2011)
- 2011 Southeast Asian Games: Lakas Pinas (November 11–22, 2011) (with AKTV on IBC)
- 2013 Asian Youth Games (August 27, 2013)
- 2013 FIFA Confederations Cup (June 15–30, 2013)
- 2013 FIFA U-20 World Cup (June 21 – July 13, 2013)
- 2013 Southeast Asian Games (only aired men's basketball, women's football and boxing events)
- A Run for the Pasig River (2009–13)
- ABS-CBN Sports presents Top Rank Boxing (2009–14)
- AFC Champions League Highlights (September 2013)
- AFC President's Cup
- AFF Suzuki Cup/Long Teng Cup/Kia Rio Cup (only aired Philippine Azkals matches)
- Asian Indoor and Martial Arts Games (July 3, 11, 2013)
- Asian 5 Nations Rugby (April 15, 18, 21, 25–27, 2012) (only aired Philippine Volcanoes matches)
- Bernard Hopkins vs. Winky Wright (July 23, 2007)
- Cobra Energy Drink Ironman 70.3 Philippines (2011–13)
- Davis Cup Highlights (April 2013)
- Demolition Day: Nonito Donaire, Jr. vs. Jorge Arce Fight (December 17, 2012)
- Dream Cup: Philippine Azkals vs. LA Galaxy (December 3, 2011)
- FilOil Flying V Hanes Premier Pre-Season Cup (2007–13)
- FIVB Volleyball World Cup (2012–13)
- Football Asia
- French Open (tennis)
- Homecoming: Oscar De La Hoya vs. Steve Forbes (May 4, 2008)
- ICTSI Aboitiz Invitational (September 13, 2013)
- ICTSI Canlubang Golf Invitational (June 7, 2011)
- ICTSI Orchard Golf Championship (2011)
- ICTSI Philippine Open (February 12, 2012)
- ICTSI Ryder Cup (July 5, 2012)
- ICTSI The Country Club Invitational and Pro-Am (March 15, 2013)
- Ilog Pasig Basketball Benefit Game (November 20, 2012)
- Invasion (Philippines vs. The World) (2008)
- JBet Queens Cup: Europe vs. Asia (2013)
- J-League Highlights
- Kapamilya All-Star Basketball Game (October 2013)
- Kapamilya All-Star Volleyball Game (October 2013)
- Kopiko 3-in-1 Supercross Series 2013 (May 26, 2013)
- Laban Na Banal Boxing Coverage (July 26, 2008)
- MBA Games (1998–2001)
- MLS (Major League Soccer) All-Stars vs Manchester United (July 25, 2011)
- Manny Pacquiao fights
  - 2006 vs. Erik Morales II
  - 2006 vs. Óscar Larios
  - 2006 vs. Erik Morales III
- NBA on Studio 23 (2011–14)
  - NBA Action (2011–14)
  - Real NBA
  - NBA All Star Weekend (2011–13)
  - NBA Playoffs (2011–13)
  - NBA Finals (2011–13)
- NBA Global Games Philippines: Houston Rockets vs. Indiana Pacers (October 10, 2013) (with Basketball TV)
- NCAA Games (Basketball & Volleyball) (2002–11)
- NCAA Opening Ceremonies (2002–11)
- NFL on Studio 23 (1996–2000)
  - NFL Super Bowl (1996–98)
- Number One-Numero Uno: Floyd Mayweather, Jr. vs. Juan Manuel Márquez (September 20, 2009)
- Philippine Azkals: Football Friendly Games (2011–13)
- Philippine Basketball Association (2011) (under Basketball TV)
- PBL on Studio 23 (2003–07)
- Philippine Collegiate Champions League (2009–14)
- Philippine Football Peace Cup (2012–13)
- Pinoy Pride Fights (2010–13)
- Rambulan sa Macau 2: Milan Melindo vs. Juan Francisco Estrada Fight (July 28, 2013)
- Solaire Philippines Open (April 24, 2013)
- Taobao World Mixed Doubles (August 2012)
- The Masters (2002–13) (under Fox Sports Asia)
- The World Awaits: Oscar De La Hoya vs. Floyd Mayweather, Jr. (May 6, 2007)
- United Football League (2011)
- U.S. Open (golf) (2011–13) (under Fox Sports Asia)
- US Open (tennis) (2008–13)
- UAAP Game of the Week (2012)
- UAAP/NCAA Bantay Bata All Stars Basketball Games (2005–11)
- UAAP Opening Ceremonies (2000–13)
- UAAP Streetdance Competition and Closing Ceremonies (2011–14)
- UEFA Champions League (2012–14)
- UEFA Europa League (2012–13)
- UEFA Magazine Show
- UEFA Super Cup (2013)
- Ultimate Fighting Championship (2005–14)
  - UFC Fight Nights
  - UFC on Fuel TV/FX/Fox
  - UFC Mayhem
  - UFC Ultimate Insider
  - UFC Countdown Primers
  - UFC Unleashed
  - UFC Wired
  - UFC 20th Anniversary Special (December 2013)
  - The Ultimate Fighter
- Vaseline Men Xterra Off Road Triatlon (2012–13)
- WBC Welterweight Championship: Floyd Mayweather, Jr. vs. Ricky Hatton (December 9, 2007)
- WWE shows
  - WWE NXT (2011–14)
  - WWE Raw (2011–14)
  - WWE Superstars (2010–14)
- WWE pay-per-views
  - WWE: Battleground
  - WWE: Elimination Chamber
  - WWE: Extreme Rules
  - WWE: Hell in a Cell
  - WWE: Money in the Bank
  - WWE: Night of Champions
  - WWE: No Way Out
  - WWE: Over the Limit
  - WWE: Payback
  - WWE: Royal Rumble
  - WWE: SummerSlam
  - WWE: Survivor Series
  - WWE: Tables, Ladders and Chairs
  - WWE: WrestleMania
- Welcome to the Future: Donaire vs. Vasquez, Jr., Chavez vs. Rubio (February 5, 2012)
- World Featherweight Championship: Yuriokis Gamboa vs. Jorge Solis (March 31, 2011)
- Yalin World 10-Ball Women's Championship (2012–13)
- Z Gorres vs. Luis Melendez (November 15, 2009)

== Studio 23 TV specials ==
- 37th Metro Manila Film Festival Parade of the Stars (December 24, 2011)
- 23 Gifts for Christmas: A Studio 23 Christmas Special (December 2009)
- ABS-CBN Independence Day Flag Raising Ceremony (2008–13)
- ABS-CBN News Yearender Reports (2007–11)
- Academy Awards "The Oscars" (2007–13)
- Celebr8: Globe Get Together Special (November–December 2000)
- Catholic Mass Media Awards
- Chief Justice on Trial: The ANC Special Coverage (January–May 2012)
- Chinese New Year Countdown Special Live at the Quirino Grandstand (2010–13)
- Dance World Cup Latin Philippines (December 17, 2011)
- DZMM SilveRadyo: The Concert (January 1, 2012)
- Game On: The Chevrolet Sonic Celebrity Challenge (April 6 & 13, 2013; together with Chevrolet)
- Guys Choice Awards (2010)
- Grammy Awards (2006–09)
- Halalan: The ABS-CBN Election Coverage (1998, 2001, 2004, 2007, 2010, 2013)
- Harapan 2013: The Senatorial Debates (April 21, 28, 2013)
- Holy Week/Holiday Movie Marathon (1997–2013)
- Inauguration of President Noynoy Aquino (June 30, 2010; together with ABS-CBN News)
- iTunes Festival (December 24 & December 31, 2012 – 2013)
- KBP Golden Dove Awards (2008–11)
- Krismas Barkada Karoling: A Studio 23 Christmas Special (December 24, 2009)
- Melason Uber in Love (February 2010)
- Michael Buble: Home for the Holidays (December 22, 2012)
- Misa Aguinaldo/Misa de Gallo (2009–12)
- Miss Cebu 2014 (January 15, 2014; aired only on Visayas & Mindanao stations)
- MNET Asia Music Awards (2011–13; together with Myx)
- Miss Universe (2008–13)
- Mr. and Ms. Hannah's Beach Resort Eco Tourism Ambassadors Pageant (June 13, 2013)
- Mutya ng Pilipinas 2011 (December 11, 2011)
- Myx Music Awards (2006–13)
- National Cheerdancing Championship (moved to Fox Sports Asia)
- National Quiz Bee (2008–13)
- Once in a Lifetime: The Rock vs. John Cena Documentary Special (April 3, 2012)
- Pilipinas Got Talent season 1 Finals (June 19, 2010)
- Primetime Emmy Awards (2004–13)
- Rey Misterio sa Pinas (August 5, 2012)
- Round 2 for Keeps: Nonito & Rachel Donaire Wedding TV Special (January 28, 2012)
- Sa Dagat at Bundok: The Philippine Biodiversity Expedition (April 19, 2012)
- Sagwan ng Tagumpay: PHL Dragon Boat Team documentary (August 1, 2011)
- Salamat, Tito Dolphy News Coverage (July 2012)
- Slimmer's World Miss Bikini Philippines 2013 (May 16, 2013)
- Search for SM Little Stars (2010–13)
- State of the Nation Address (July 1997–July 2013) (carrying ANC)
- Tambayan OPM Awards 2012 (July 13, 2012)
- Teen Choice Awards (2002–12)
- The Making of the Sound of Music (April 1, 2012)
- The Making of 1DOL/1DOL 1st Episode (September 6, 2010)
- The Voice of Mcdonald's Grand Finals (June 14, 2013)
- Tournament of Roses Parade (2008–14, on New Year's Day)
- UAAP Cheerdance Competition (2002–13)
- UFC sa ABS-CBN: Mark Munoz: The Filipino Fighter (June–July 2012)
- U2 360 Concert Live at the Rose Bowl (May 19, 2010)
- Victoria's Secret Fashion Show 2010 (September 6, 2011)
- Y Speak's Campaigns 2010: A Youth Leadership Forum (October 24, 2009)
- Zoren-Carmina: Always Forever, a Wedding Like No Other TV Special (December 22, 2012)
