= Iba-Balita =

2010 Philippine defunct television news show

- Genre: News program
- Created by: ABS-CBN Corporation/Studio 23
- Developed by: ABS-CBN News and Current Affairs
- Directed by: Francisco Fernandez
- Presented by: Anthony Taberna; Tina Marasigan
- Opening theme: "Anything But Tangerines" by Tommy Tallarico (from the video-game Earthworm Jim 2)
- Country of origin: Philippines
- Original language: Tagalog
- No. of episodes: n/a (airs daily)

Production
- Executive producer: J.C. Gonzales
- Camera setup: Multiple-camera setup
- Running time: 45 minutes

Original release
- Network: Studio 23
- Release: October 4, 2010 – January 16, 2014

Related
- News Central; News plus; The Score; Iba-Balita Ngayon

Iba-Balita is a Philippine television news broadcasting show broadcast by Studio 23. Anchored by Anthony Taberna, it aired from October 4, 2010 to January 16, 2014, replacing News Central and was replaced by News plus.

== Anchors ==
- Anthony Taberna
- Tina Marasigan (Sports Balita and Showbiz Balita segment presenter)

== See also ==
- List of programs broadcast by Studio 23
- ABS-CBN News and Current Affairs
- Iba-Balita Ngayon
- TV Patrol
- Bandila
