= Jef Gaitan =

Filipino actress

Jef Gaitan-Fernandez
- Born: September 21, 1989 (age 37); Laguna, Philippines
- Occupations: Actress; model
- Years active: 2009–present
- Spouse: Renz Fernandez (m. 2024)
- Children: 1
- Relatives: Rudy Fernandez (father-in-law); Lorna Tolentino (mother-in-law)

Jef Gaitan-Fernandez (born September 21, 1989) is a Filipino actress who first started as a TV commercial model and the year 2009 she joined Survivor Philippines Palau which was aired on GMA Network. She finished the season as one of the top three in the finale episode of Survivor Philippines Palau. Gaitan later on became a semi regular in Party Pilipinas. she had a one-month stint on GMA's Dear Friend which she co-starred with Marvin Kiefer, Jennica Garcia and Carl Guevara.

She also appeared on various TV5 series such as Ang Utol Kong Hoodlum, Bangis as Inang Filomena and The Sisters.

In 2013, she worked on ABS CBN's late night comedy gag show Banana Nite.

From 2014 to 2015, she became a co-host for News+ in ABS-CBN Sports and Action, handling Entertainment News with Anthony Taberna as the Anchor for the news program.

In 2016, Gaitan was part of the drama fantasy series, My Super D as Apple.

In 2020, Jef was part of the drama series offering of ABS-CBN, Ang sa Iyo ay Akin, aired on Kapamilya Channel.

== Filmography ==
=== Film ===
Year	Title	Role
2024	That Kind Of Love	
2019	Marineros: Men in the Middle of the Sea	
2013	Menor De Edad	Ms. Dimayuga
2011	Won't Last a Day Without You	Sexy Girl
2010	Working Girls	Sara

=== Television/digital series ===
Year	Title	Role
2023–2024	Nag-aapoy na Damdamin	Amanda Alvarez
2023–2024	ASAP	Herself / Performer
2022–2023	Mars Ravelo's Darna	Klara Balisi / Seductress
2022	The Broken Marriage Vow	Bani De Vera
2021
2021	Maalaala Mo Kaya: Bisikleta	Lisa
2021	Maalaala Mo Kaya: Flyers	Lisa
2021	Maalaala Mo Kaya: Tricycle	Mary Rose's friend
2020–2021	Ang sa Iyo ay Akin	Cristina Villarosa
2019	Maalaala Mo Kaya: Sinturon	Deborah
2019	Maalaala Mo Kaya: Pregnancy Test	Carmi
2018	Ngayon at Kailanman	Janix
2018	Halik	Ivory Jimenez
2017–2018	La Luna Sangre	Karen
2016	Langit Lupa	Monique
2016	Eat Bulaga!	Challenge Accepted contestant
2016	Maalaala Mo Kaya: Korona	Kontesera
2016	FPJ's Ang Probinsyano	Lara
2016	My Super D	Apple
2016	Ipaglaban Mo: Linlang	Ces
2015	Maalaala Mo Kaya: Rosas	Young Mila
2015	You're My Home	Maureen Enriquez
2015	Maalaala Mo Kaya: Picture	Anne
2014	Ipaglaban Mo: Kasal Ka Sa Akin	Chona
2014	Goin' Bulilit Presents: The Prodigal Son	Luke's Mom
2014	Maalaala Mo Kaya: Arroz Caldo	Lorna
2014	News+	Showbiz News Anchor
2013	Banana Split	Herself
2012	Precious Hearts Romances Presents: Lumayo Ka Man Sa Akin	Marla
2011	Ang Utol Kong Hoodlum	Bambi
2011	Bagets: Just Got Lucky	Miss Jelai
2011	Mars Ravelo's Captain Barbell	Daisy
2009	Survivor Philippines: Palau	Herself / Contestant

== Awards and recognition ==
=== FHM rankings ===
Gaitan first appeared for FHM Philippines with Wendy Valdez on "Zoo themed" cover in October 2010, 3 years later she was reappeared for Empress Schuck cover FHM 13th Anniversary special also featuring Valdez, Chloe Dauden and Karen Bordador. She also appeared on Online Babe (now FHM Idols) section for October 2013, three months later Gaitan joined with former Sexbomb Sunshine Garcia and former Wowowee dancer Aiko Climaco dubbed as Banana Nite Girls cover for January 2014.

Year	Award	Category	Result	Note
2011	FHM Philippines	100 Sexiest Woman	Rank # 48	
2012	FHM Philippines	100 Sexiest Woman	Rank # 26	
2013	FHM Philippines	100 Sexiest Woman	Rank # 31	
2014	FHM Philippines	100 Sexiest Woman	Rank # 25	
2015	FHM Philippines	100 Sexiest Woman	Rank # 33	

== Personal life ==
In June 2024, Renz Fernandez married Gaitan at Las Casas Filipinas de Acuzar with wedding sponsors Senator Grace Poe, Senator Lito Lapid and Manny Pacquiao. and they have a son Victor who is born in April 2025.

Preceded by Chloe Dauden	FHM Online Babe (October 2013)	Succeeded by Karen Bordador
Preceded by Alice Dixson	FHM Cover Girl (January 2014) with Sunshine Garcia and Aiko Climaco	Succeeded by Phoemela Baranda
