= Wapakman =

- Directed by: Topel Lee
- Screenplay by: John Roque
- Story by: Emmanuel dela Cruz
- Produced by: Butch Ibañez; Osh Medina; Ronald Stephen Monteverde; Wilson Tieng
- Starring: Manny Pacquiao
- Cinematography: Louie Quirino
- Edited by: Jose Alfaro Rivera Borgy Torre
- Music by: Von De Guzman
- Production companies: MP Promotions; Reality Entertainment
- Distributed by: Solar Entertainment Corporation
- Release date: December 25, 2009
- Country: Philippines
- Language: Filipino
- Budget: ₱30 million
- Box office: ₱2.6 million (Official 2009 MMFF run) (Official Domestic run)

Wapakman is a 2009 Philippine superhero comedy film directed by Topel Lee and starring eight-division world boxing champion Manny Pacquiao. It was released on December 25, 2009, as an entry to the 2009 Metro Manila Film Festival.

== Cast ==
- Manny Pacquiao as Magno Meneses
- Rufa Mae Quinto as Magda Meneses
- Bianca King as Mystika
- Krista Ranillo as Birita Octavia/Screamer
- Keanna Reeves as Lenlen
- Barbie Forteza as Patitang Meneses
- Polo Ravales as Emerson Pochochay/Combuster
- Onyok Velasco as Goliath
- Mica Torre as Maegan Meneses
- Chacha Cañete as Maricel Meneses
- Long Mejia as Kadyo
- Benjie Paras as Kulas
- Jairus Aquino as Dingdong Meneses
- Jojo Alejar as Dr. Rex
- Socorro Garcia Bellen as Coring

== Reception ==
The film was not well received by the public, and on the first day of opening landed last place in the box-office in the two-week Metro Manila Film Festival. It was also one of two films (the other being Nobody, Nobody But... Juan starring Dolphy) to not win an award during the festival, it was considered a box office flop of 2009.

== See also ==
- Box office bomb
