= Stalkers (TV series) =

- Genre: thriller
- Written by: Easy Ferrer
- Directed by: Easy Ferrer
- Starring: Wilbert Ross; Rose Van Ginkel
- Country of origin: Philippines
- Original language: Filipino
- No. of seasons: 1
- No. of episodes: 4

Production
- Producers: Vicente G. del Rosario III; Valerie S. Del Rosario
- Cinematography: Dexter Dela Peña
- Editor: Augie Balignasay
- Camera setup: Multi-camera
- Running time: 45 minutes
- Production company: Viva Films

Original release
- Network: Vivamax
- Release: 26 February 2023

Stalkers is a Filipino thriller television series premiered on February 26, 2023, on Vivamax. Directed and written by Easy Ferrer and produced by Vicente G. del Rosario III and Valerie S. Del Rosario, the series features Wilbert Ross and Rose Van Ginkel.

== Cast ==
- Wilbert Ross as Harry
- Rose Van Ginkel as Apple
- Mark Anthony Fernandez as Bernard
- Yayo Aguila as Lorie
- Nico Locco as Uno
- Gwen Garci as Joanna
- Keanna Reeves as Monica
- Chloe Jenna as Cherrie Ann
- Millen Gal as Paula
- Rash Flores as Lester
- Shiena Yu as Clarisse
- Renz Tantoco as Sam

== Episodes ==
No.	Title	Original release date	Prod. code
1	"He Sees Her"	26 February 2023	59 min
2	"He Follows Her"	5 March 2023	51 min
3	"He Unwraps Her"	12 March 2023	45 min
4	"He Kills Her"	19 March 2023	44 min

== Production ==
The series was announced by Viva Films on Vivamax consisting of four episodes. Wilbert Ross, Rose Van Ginkel, Mark Anthony Fernandez, Yayo Aguila, Nico Locco, Gwen Garci, Keanna Reeves, Chloe Jenna, Millen Gal, Rash Flores and Shiena Yu were cast to appear in the series.

The trailer of the series was released on February 19, 2023.
