= News plus =

- Genre: News program
- Developed by: ABS-CBN News and Current Affairs; ABS-CBN Sports
- Directed by: Rommel Pedrealba
- Presented by: Anthony Taberna; Jef Gaitan
- Opening theme: "Anchorman" by Chris Blackwell Audio Network Limited
- Country of origin: Philippines
- Original languages: Filipino; Tagalog; English (w/ subtitles except live reports & interviews)
- No. of episodes: n/a (airs weeknights)

Production
- Running time: 30-45 minutes

Original release
- Network: S+A
- Release: January 20 – December 26, 2014

Related
- Iba-Balita; The Score

News plus, stylized as News+ is a Philippine television news broadcasting show broadcast by S+A. Anchored by Anthony Taberna, it aired from January 20 to December 26, 2014, replacing Iba-Balita.

The program deviated from traditional news programs by providing an in-depth views of daily news and events.

== Anchors ==
Main anchor

- Anthony Taberna

Substitute anchors

- Jasmin Romero
- Jing Castañeda
- Maan Macapagal
- TJ Manotoc
- Johnson Manabat
- Jorge Cariño

Segment presenter

- Jef Gaitan (Showbiz News)

== See also ==
- List of programs broadcast by ABS-CBN Sports and Action
