= Ya Chang =

Japanese actor

- Born: 山口 泰明 (Yamaguchi Yasuaki); Gunma Prefecture, Japan
- Occupations: Actor; Comedian; Recording artist

Yasuaki Yamaguchi (山口 泰明, Yamaguchi Yasuaki; born in Gunma, Japan), known by his stage name Ya Chang, is a Japanese actor, comedian, and recording artist currently active in the Philippines.

== Career ==
Yamaguchi was a businessman in Gunma, Japan before he went to the Manila, Philippines just to meet Jopay Paguia of Sexbomb Girls. He often appeared in Eat Bulaga! where he was discovered. He then became a host of MTB: Ang Saya-Saya.

Yamaguchi appeared in ABS-CBN TV shows such as Aalog-Alog and Quizon Avenue. He also appeared in the drama anthology Maalaala Mo Kaya, portraying his own life story. He also assisted the show's crew on their first episode that was set in Japan, and appeared as Kenjie in ABS-CBN's Eva Fonda, acting as an antagonist for the first time.

Yamaguchi appeared on Dobol Trobol: Lets Get Redi 2 Rambol! as a guest and on Nobody, Nobody But... Juan, portraying a Japanese officer during Japanese Occupation of the Philippines. He also appeared as an engineer for Lim Aviations in ABS-CBN's Be Careful With My Heart.

Yamaguchi is a presenter for the travel show Biyaheng Bulilit, along with Tatay Nishii and Cha-cha "Bulilit" Cañete, and currently appears in TV5 as a host after Amachan Hallo Hallo Café, taking part in contests against viewers and his co-hosts.

== Discography ==
Album Information	Track Listing
Daijobu: Released: August 2005; Label: Star Records; Language: Filipino, English, Japanese; Total Length: 22:59	1. Aishteru, I Love You; 2. Sayaw Ya Chang; 3. Anone (Originally sung by Jaymie Baby); 4. Daijobu; 5. Pesteng Pag-ibig; 6. Rico Mambo

== Filmography ==
=== Television ===
List of television appearances
Year	Title	Role
2004	SCQ Reload: Ok Ako!	Himself
2005	Magandang Tanghali Bayan	Host
2005	Quizon Avenue	Himself
2005	Maalaala Mo Kaya	Eichi
2006	Aalog-Alog	Sandaro Yamamoto
2007	Homeboy	Himself
2009	Eva Fonda	Kenjie
2010	Biyaheng Bulilit	Himself
2011	Laugh Out Loud	Himself
2011	Maalaala Mo Kaya	Mr. Hiroshi
2012–2014	Be Careful with My Heart	Engr. Yamaguchi
2013–2014	Got to Believe	Manager of Agency
2013–2014	Jim Fernandez's Galema, Anak ni Zuma	Ken
2015	Flordeliza	Mr. Chua
2015	Hallo Hallo Café	Himself/host

=== Movies ===
List of acting performances in film
Year	Title	Role
1993	Philadelphia	Japanese Tourister
2008	Dobol Trobol: Lets Get Redi 2 Rambol!	Japanese customer/cameo role
2009	Nobody, Nobody But... Juan	Japanese officer
2012	Moron 5 and the Crying Lady	Beckie's husband
