= XXX: Exklusibong, Explosibong, Exposé =

Philippine television documentary show

- Title screen from 2006 to 2009
- Genre: News show; Investigative news; Crime
- Created by: ABS-CBN Corporation
- Developed by: ABS-CBN News and Current Affairs
- Directed by: Jimmy Dasal
- Presented by: Julius Babao; Karen Davila; Henry Omaga-Diaz; Pinky Webb; Alex Santos; Anthony Taberna
- Country of origin: Philippines
- Original language: Tagalog
- No. of episodes: 360

Production
- Executive producer: Myra Afable-Chavez
- Editor: Alvin John Capiz
- Running time: 45 minutes

Original release
- Network: ABS-CBN
- Release: March 4, 2006 – February 18, 2013

Related
- Magandang Gabi, Bayan; Bistado; Mission X Mission Possible

XXX: Exklusibong, Explosibong, Exposé (transl. XXX: exclusive, explosive, exposé) is a Philippine television documentary show broadcast by ABS-CBN. Originally hosted by Julius Babao, Karen Davila, and Henry Omaga-Diaz, it aired on the network's Saturday evening line-up from March 4, 2006, to February 18, 2013. Babao, Pinky Webb, and Anthony Taberna served as the final hosts.

== About ==
XXX is a public affairs program that exposed illegal activities from the government down to the streets of the Philippines. XXX coordinated with local law enforcement agencies to help bring to justice people or entities that exploit individuals. Using hidden cameras, XXX documented the schemes and modus operandi used in alleged criminal activities.

=== 2006–2008: Babao-Davila-Omaga-Diaz era ===
The show was launched on March 4, 2006, and was hosted by Julius Babao, Karen Davila, and Henry Omaga-Diaz. It was aired on a Saturday primetime time slot.

=== 2008–2009: Babao-Webb-Omaga-Diaz era ===
On May 3, 2008, Pinky Webb replaced Davila as host, who left the show to host Wonder Mom. The show slightly changed its opening billboard to include Webb.

=== 2009–2010: Babao-Webb-Santos era ===
On February 28, 2009, Alex Santos replaced Omaga-Diaz as host, and the opening theme/billboard, title card, graphics and filming set were changed.

On September 26 and October 3, XXX held two special episodes on Typhoons Ondoy and Pepeng.

On October 12, 2009, following the premiere of Pinoy Big Brother: Double Up, XXX moved its timeslot from its Saturday primetime airing to a late night Monday airing after Bandila, replacing Kalye.

=== 2010–2013: Babao-Webb-Taberna era ===
On June 28, 2010, Anthony Taberna replaced Santos as host, and the opening billboard was slightly changed. The show aired its final episode on February 18, 2013, being replaced by Bistado.

== Hosts ==
Hosts

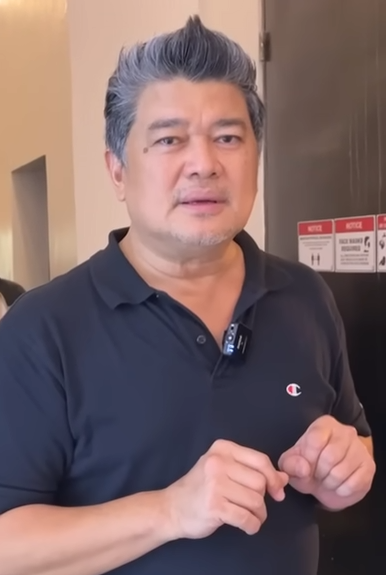
Julius Babao

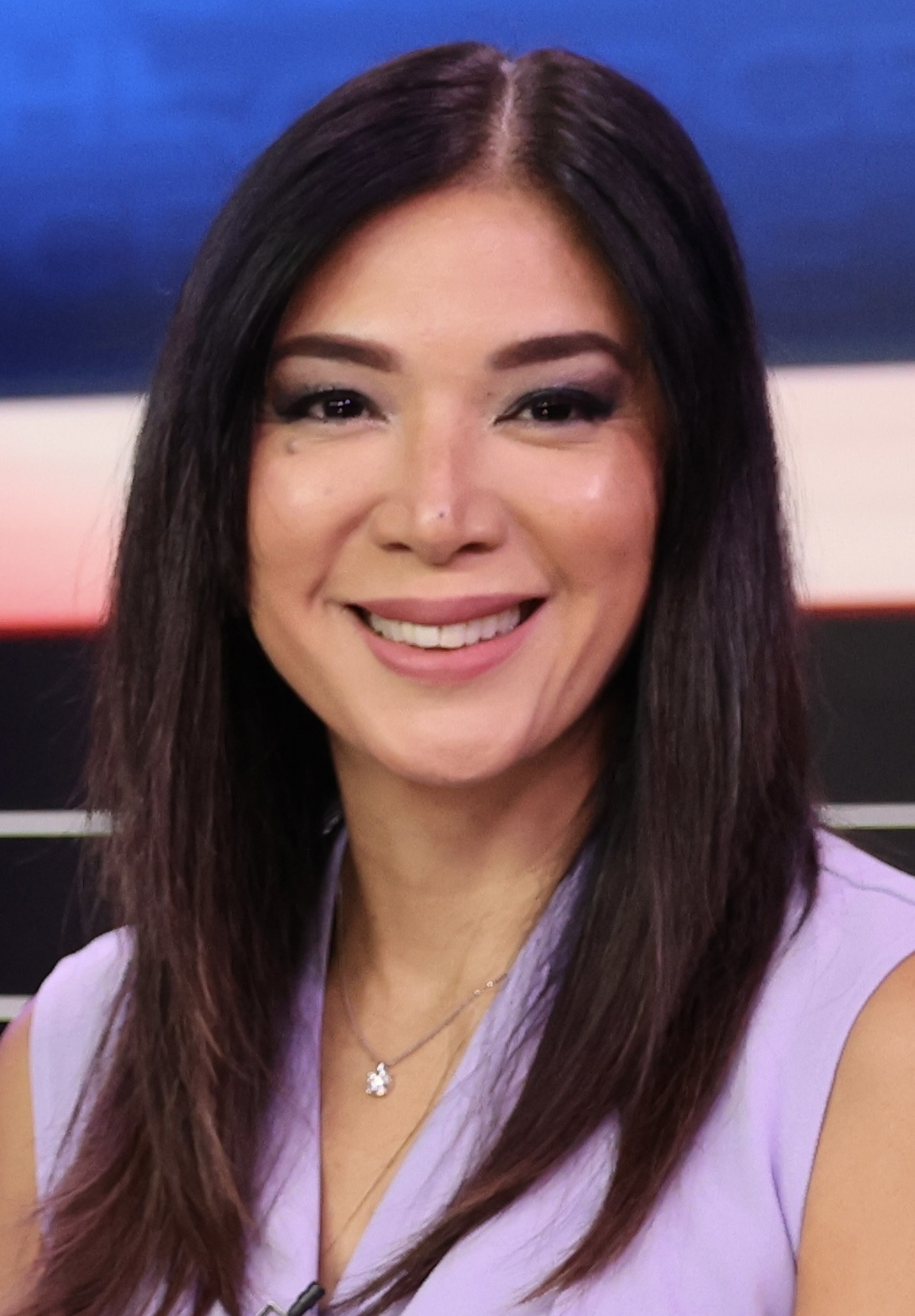
Pinky Webb

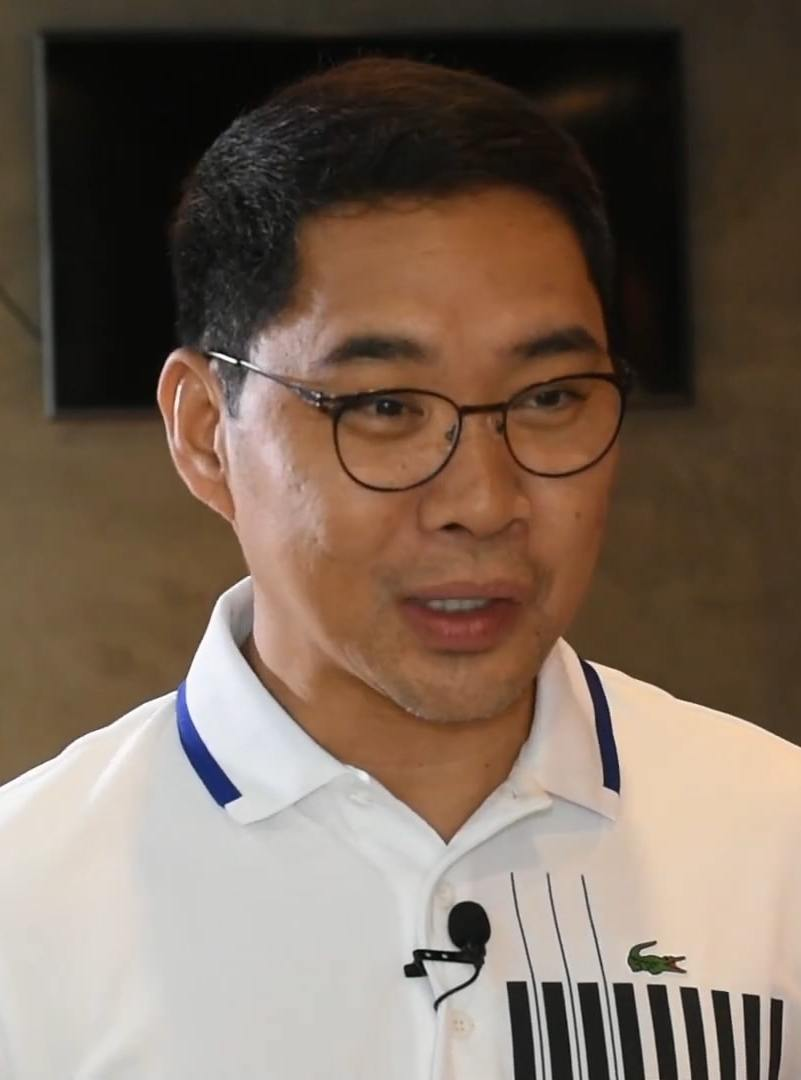
Anthony Taberna

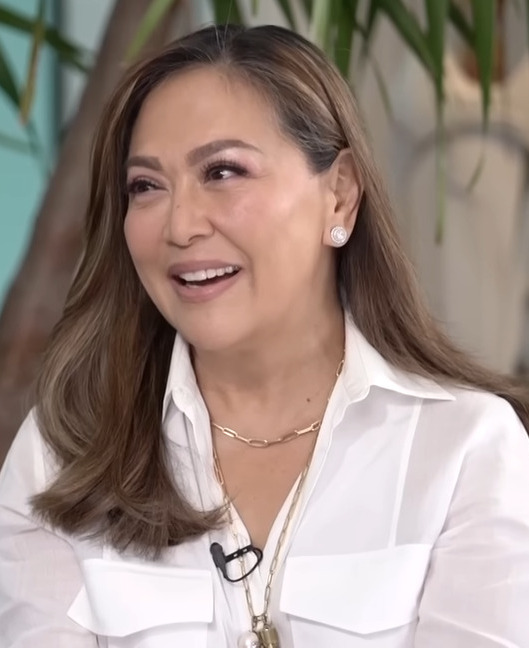
Karen Davila

- Julius Babao (2006–13)
- Karen Davila (2006–08)
- Henry Omaga-Diaz (2006–09)
- Pinky Webb (2008–13)
- Alex Santos (2009–10)
- Anthony Taberna (2010–13)

== On Studio 23 and ANC ==
- XXX was aired on Studio 23 on Thursday 9:30 p.m. and also was aired on ABS-CBN News Channel every Saturday 2 p.m. and Tuesday 6 p.m. as replay from Monday episode on ABS-CBN 2.

== On DZMM TeleRadyo ==
- XXX aired in DZMM TeleRadyo on September 5, 2011, at 9:15 p.m. It was announced on August 30, 2011, in DZMM's Dos por Dos. This was seen only in DZMM TeleRadyo.

== See also ==
- List of programs broadcast by ABS-CBN
- ABS-CBN News and Current Affairs
- Imbestigador
