= Kulilits =

- Genre: Children's television series
- Created by: ABS-CBN News and Current Affairs
- Presented by: Cha-Cha Cañete; Bugoy Cariño; Izzy Canillo
- Opening theme: "Huwag Kang Makulit" by Vhong Navarro
- Country of origin: Philippines
- Original language: Filipino
- No. of episodes: 47

Production
- Running time: 45 minutes
- Production company: ABS-CBN News and Current Affairs

Original release
- Network: ABS-CBN
- Release: October 31, 2009 – September 18, 2010

Kulilits is a Philippine children's television show on ABS-CBN. It features teaching children moral and values to singing new songs to dances and to mathematics. The show is hosted by Cha-Cha Cañete, Bugoy Cariño and Izzy Canillo. It aired from October 31, 2009, to September 18, 2010, replacing Wonder Mom.

== See also ==
- List of programs aired by ABS-CBN
- ABS-CBN News and Current Affairs
