= Keanna Reeves =

Filipina actress and comedienne

- Born: Janet Derecho Duterte; September 24, 1970 (age 56); Cebu City, Philippines
- Occupations: Actress, comedian
- Years active: 2006–present

Janet Derecho Duterte (born September 24, 1970), known professionally as Keanna Reeves, is a Filipina actress and comedian. She won the first celebrity edition of the reality show Pinoy Big Brother in 2006. She first gained national attention and notoriety in December 2004 after revealing that she was an escort, confessing that lawmakers were among her clients.

== Biography ==
=== Early life and career ===
Duterte adopted the stage name Keanna Reeves as a feminine version of Hollywood actor Keanu Reeves' name.

=== Pinoy Big Brother ===
In 2005, she appeared on Extra Challenge, where she won the challenges with her teammate and then enemy Tita Swarding. Continuing her stints on reality shows, in February 2006, she was selected to be one of the 14 housemates in Pinoy Big Brother: Celebrity Edition. She won the competition, winning P4 million worth of cash and prizes. Her chosen charity, women's rights advocate group Gabriela (the sister party of Bayan Muna), received P1 million. She did one movie, Binibining K with Troy Montero in 2006.

== Filmography ==
=== Film ===
Year	Title	Role
2006	Binibining K	Keanna
2006	I Wanna Be Happy	
2006	Reyna: ang makulay na pakikipagsapalaran ng mga achucherva, achuchuva, achechenes...	Ginnifer Balisteros / Ivanka La Strada
2006	Shake, Rattle and Roll 8	Marge
2007	Sapi	
2009	Astig	Selya
2009	Nobody, Nobody But... Juan	Maid
2009	Wapakman	Lenlen
2014	Magtiwala Ka: A Yolanda Story	
2017	Ligaw	Madam Aurora
2018	Signal Rock	Mommy Chi
2023	BJJ: Woman on Top	Blessy

=== Television ===
Year	Title	Role
2006	Your Song	
2006	Pinoy Big Brother: Celebrity Edition 1	Herself / Housemate / Celebrity Big Winner
2006	Aalog-Alog	Keanna Padilla
2006	Maging Sino Ka Man	Guada
2006	Pilipinas, Game Ka Na Ba?	Herself
2006	Maalaala Mo Kaya: Jeepney	Joy
2007	Margarita	Didith
2008	Goin' Bulilit	Herself
2008	May Bukas Pa	Beggar Girl
2008	My Girl	Nena
2009	Showtime	Herself
2009	May Bukas Pa	Charisse
2011	Laugh Out Loud	Herself
2011	Everybody Hapi	Jennifer
2011	I Dare You: The Kapamilya Exchange	Herself
2011	Maalaala Mo Kaya: Wig	Nanay
2012	Wansapanataym: Pinay's Big Sister	Leoning
2012	Maalaala Mo Kaya: Aso	Guest
2012	Kapitan Awesome	Prinsesa Anyari
2013	Wansapanataym: Number One Father & Son	Fairy
2013	Toda Max	Lola
2013	Biyaheng Bulilit	Herself
2015	Home Sweetie Home	Tita Ems
2016	Juan Happy Love Story	Evelyn (Agatha's aunt)
2017	Brillante Mendoza Presents	Myrna
2019	Dear Uge	Demi
2019–2020	The Killer Bride	Ingrid Sanchez
2021–2022	Hoy, Love You!	Aling Malu
2021	Pinoy Big Brother: Kumunity Season 10	Herself
2023	Stalkers	Monica
2026	House of Lies	Mrs. Sutherland

Preceded by Nene Tamayo (Romblon)	Pinoy Big Brother; Big Winner; 2006	Succeeded by Kim Chiu (Cebu City)
Preceded by First	Pinoy Big Brother Celebrity Edition; Big Winner; 2006	Succeeded by Ruben Gonzaga
