= Umagang Kay Ganda =

Philippine television news and talk show

- Final title card used from 2015 to 2020
- Also known as: UKG
- Genre: News broadcasting; Talk show
- Directed by: Kits Fernandez
- Presented by: See hosts
- Opening theme: "Umagang Kay Ganda" by Imago (2007–11) by Sponge Cola (2011–20)
- Country of origin: Philippines
- Original language: Filipino

Production
- Executive producer: Engelbert Apostol
- Camera setup: Multiple-camera setup
- Production company: ABS-CBN News and Current Affairs

Original release
- Network: ABS-CBN
- Release: June 25, 2007 – May 5, 2020

Related
- Alas Singko y Medya / Magandang Umaga, Bayan / Pilipinas (1996–2007)

Umagang Kay Ganda (transl. a morning so beautiful, abbreviated as UKG) is a Philippine television news broadcasting and talk show broadcast by ABS-CBN. Originally hosted by Edu Manzano, Pinky Webb, Anthony Taberna, Alex Santos, Winnie Cordero, Donita Rose, Ogie Diaz, Kim Atienza, Bernadette Sembrano, and Rica Peralejo. The show aired on the network's morning line up from June 25, 2007, to May 5, 2020, replacing Magandang Umaga, Pilipinas and was replaced by Kapamilya Daily Mass and Kabayan on Kapamilya Channel and Bro. Eddie Villanueva Classics and A2Z School at Home on A2Z's morning timeslot.

== Format ==
The main ingredient in this morning show was audience interaction and participation. In line with the format, they aired their show from Club O (formerly Dish) in the ABS-CBN compound to make the show more accessible to the audience. The program included live traffic points from six key points in Metro Manila, as well as occasional regional news.

== Broadcast ==
In some provinces at 6:15 AM, ABS-CBN Regional Network Group would cut this program mid-way (without any notice) to air forty-five minutes of provincial morning programming. Each local morning program, produced by their respective news departments, features news and features related to its target regional audience. Due to the network's shutdown, these regional programs were then aired on their respective Facebook pages and YouTube at 7:00 AM, until their last broadcasts aired on August 28, 2020.

- Baguio/Dagupan (North Luzon) - Bagong Morning Kapamilya
- Naga City/Legazpi (Bicol) - Marhay na Aga Kapamilya
- Iloilo (Panay) - Panay Sikat
- Bacolod (Negros) - The Morning Show
- Cebu (Central Visayas) - Maayong Buntag Kapamilya
- Tacloban (Eastern Visayas) - Maupay nga Aga Kapamilya
- Cagayan de Oro/Iligan/Butuan (North Mindanao) - Pamahaw Espesyal
- Davao (Southern Mindanao) - Maayong Buntag Mindanao
- General Santos/Cotabato (South Central Mindanao) - Magandang Umaga South Central Mindanao
- Zamboanga (Chavacano) - Buenos Dias Zamboanga

== History ==
Umagang Kay Ganda premiered on June 25, 2007, at 5:15 AM, replacing Magandang Umaga, Pilipinas. The original hosts include Edu Manzano, Pinky Webb, Anthony Taberna, Alex Santos, Winnie Cordero, Donita Rose, Ogie Diaz, Kim Atienza, Bernadette Sembrano, and Rica Peralejo.

Manzano and Diaz left the program more than two years later. Manzano was running for Vice President, while Diaz was concentrating on hosting Entertainment Live.

On May 11, 2009, Umagang Kay Ganda launched "Boto Mo iPatrol Mo Ako Ang Simula" in preparation for the 2010 Philippine elections.

On July 13, 2009, Ginger Conejero and Atom Araullo separately joined the program, filling the vacancy by the departure of Manzano and Diaz.

On October 21, 2009, Kim Atienza left the program to join the talent competition program (and now noontime variety show) Showtime (later known as It's Showtime) as one of the hosts.

On March 22, 2010, Andrei Felix, Bekimon, and Phoemela Baranda joined the program as hosts. The same year, Araullo left the show to concentrate on field reporting. In February 2011, the program was reformatted, with Iya Villania, Jeffrey Tam, and Miss Universe 2010 fourth runner-up Venus Raj joining the program to replace Sembrano, Peralejo, Conejero and Bekimon. On August 1 of the same year, Bernadette Sembrano returned to the show after six months, replacing Webb.

On January 30, 2012, Bianca Gonzalez replaced Donita Rose (who left the show to train as a professional chef), while Anthony Taberna's Dos por Dos co-host Gerry Baja joined the program as hosts. The Balitaktakan would then serve as a cross-platform collaboration with Dos por Dos, hosted by Baja and Taberna, extending its simulcast to DZMM-AM and DZMM TeleRadyo during this portion.

On June 4, 2012, comedian-actor Ariel Ureta joined the program as one of the new hosts.

On January 28, 2013, Jorge Cariño joined the program replacing Santos, while Araullo returned to the show after three years.

On February 10, 2014, Umagang Kay Ganda shortened its timeslot from 5:00 AM to 7:30 AM to give way for the airing extension of talk show Kris TV.

On October 2, 2015, Bernadette Sembrano left the show to focus on anchoring TV Patrol.

On October 23, 2015, Umagang Kay Ganda ended its broadcast on ANC in preparation for the major revamp of the channel's programming, logo and imaging. The timeslot was replaced by Mornings @ ANC and Early Edition.

On June 20, 2016, Umagang Kay Ganda brought back its original three-hour runtime from 5:00 AM to 8:00 AM.

On September 15, 2017, Atom Araullo left the program (following his departure from ABS-CBN) as he would transfer back to GMA Network on September 21. The next year, Kori Quintos and Jeff Canoy joined the show replacing Araullo and former PAGASA weatherman Alvin Pura.

On April 2, 2018, Umagang Kay Ganda, along with the other ABS-CBN News and Current Affairs programs, switched to high-definition format.

On July 29, 2019, Canoy officially became a permanent co-host after filling-in for Araullo.

On March 18, 2020, Umagang Kay Ganda was temporarily replaced by the simulcast of DZMM TeleRadyo on the show's timeslot for the first time in years as provisional programming. The program returned to air on May 4, though it began at 6:00 AM rather than 4:55 AM as DZMM's Garantisadong Balita remained on air. However, due to the shutdown of ABS-CBN on the evening of May 5, 2020, caused by a cease-and-desist order from the National Telecommunications Commission after its legislative franchise expired the day prior, the program continued broadcasting as Umagang Kwentuhan on Facebook Live the day after until June 30. On July 15, 2020, the current affairs division's documentary section of ABS-CBN News, including the staff from the program became part of the series of retrenchments following the July 10 vote of the House Committee on Legislative Franchises denied the network a congressional franchise and cancelled.

== Hosts ==
=== Final main hosts ===
- Anthony Taberna (2007–20)
- Winnie Cordero (2007–20)
- Ariel Ureta (2012–20)
- Amy Perez (2013–20)
- Jorge Cariño (2013–20)
- Tina Marasigan (2015–20)
- Gretchen Ho (2016–20)
- Jeff Canoy (2019–20)
- Ariella Arida (2019–20)
- Kori Quintos (2019–20)

=== Final co-hosts ===
- Bryan Termulo (2014–20)
- Hanz Cua (2015–20)
- Marlo Mortel (2015–20)
- K Brosas (2016–20)
- Long Mejia (2016–20)
- Dawn Chang (2016–20)
- Tommy Esguerra (2018–20)
- KaladKaren Davila (2018–20)
- Lady Pipay Navarro (2018–20)
- Jackque Gonzaga (2018–20)
- Isabela Vinzon (2018–20)
- Justin Cuyugan (2019–20)
- Jeremy Glinoga (2019–20)

=== Final guest and featured hosts ===
- Robi Domingo (2015–20)
- Hashtags Members (2015–20)
- Clarence Delgado (2015–20)
- Mutya Orquia (2016–20)
- Dominic Roque (2016–20)
- Arron Villaflor (2016–20)
- Marco Masa (2016–20)
- Eric Nicolas (2016–20)
- Upgrade (boyband group) (2016–20)
- Pia Gutierrez (2016–20)
- Adrian Ayalin (2016–20)
- Renee Salud (2017–20)
- Jasmin Romero (2018–20)
- Cast of Team Yey! (2018–20)
- Pat Reyes (UKG Squad; 2019–20)
- Rox Montealegre (UKG Squad; 2019–20)
- Jeffrey Hernaez (2019–20)

=== Former hosts ===
- Ogie Diaz (2007–08)
- Edu Manzano (2007–09)
- Kim Atienza (2007–09)
- Pinky Webb (2007–11)
- Rica Peralejo (2007–11)
- Donita Rose (2007–12)
- Alex Santos (2007–13)
- Bernadette Sembrano (2007–11; 2011–15)
- Ginger Conejero (2009–11)
- Atom Araullo (2009–10; 2013–17)
- Phoemela Baranda (2010–12)
- Andrei Felix (2010–13)
- Rico J. Puno (2011) (deceased)
- Venus Raj (2011–13)
- Iya Villania (2011–13)
- Bianca Gonzalez (2012–14)
- Gerry Baja (2012)
- Zen Hernandez (2013)
- Doris Bigornia (2013–14)
- Melai Cantiveros (2014–16)
- Ella Cruz (2015–18)
- Alvin Pura (2015–17)
- Sam Shoaf (2018)
- Martin Javier (UKG Squad; 2019–20)

=== Former segment presenters ===
- Lucky Mercado (2007–08)
- Zenaida Seva (2007–11) (deceased)

== Segments ==
=== Final segments ===
- Umagang Balita: A two-part news bulletin, competing with two other morning news bulletins including Unang Hirit's segment Unang Balita on GMA Network.
  - 6:00 A.M. - bulletin featuring national, international, regional, and showbiz news; anchored by Amy Perez, Jorge Carino, and Jeff Canoy. This is considered as the main news bulletin of the morning show.
  - 7:00 A.M. - bulletin featuring more national, international and regional news.
- Showbiz Balita: Entertainment news segment anchored by Amy Perez.
- Eh Kasi Lalaki: Hosted by Anthony Taberna and Jorge Cariño.
- Umagang Kay Sarap: Recipe of the day.
- Ano Ba Yan?

== Controversies ==
=== Taberna's remarks on rape victim ===
On February 19, 2018, a news report of a 19-year-old girl was delivered; she was allegedly gang-raped after meeting up with someone she was chatting with online. In the background, however, Anthony Taberna's voice can be heard, saying, "This is just remarkable. It’s not the first time that this happened. There have been so many incidents like this of eyeball meet-ups. What’s more dangerous is you not only go to that eyeball meet-up, you even went out for a drink. That’s the problem, that’s the hardest of all, especially since you’re drinking out with an all-male group." Later, seemingly cutting off Jeff Canoy, Taberna was heard saying, "No. The truth is it’s easy to say that to men. Excuse me in so far as the victim is concerned, the one who must be given justice. But this should be a warning for future incidents. If you’re a woman, don’t enter a hole of evil-doers."

== Accolades ==
Year	Award	Category	Outcome
2018	32nd PMPC Star Awards for Television	Best Morning Show	Won
2017	UPLB GANDINGAN 2017	Best Morning Show	Won
2016	30th PMPC Star Awards for Television	Best Morning Show	Nominated
2016	30th PMPC Star Awards for Television	Best Morning Show Host	Won
2016	2nd PUP Mabini Media Awards	Best Morning Program	Won
2015	29th PMPC Star Awards for Television	Best Morning Show	Won
2015	29th PMPC Star Awards for Television	Best Morning Show Host	Nominated
2015	1st Gawad Kamalayan Awards of Mapúa Institute of Technology	Best Morning Show	Won
2014	28th PMPC Star Awards for Television	Best Morning Show and Best Morning Show Hosts	Won
2014	22nd Golden Dove Awards For Television	Best Television Newscast Program	Won
2014	1st PUP Mabini Media Awards	Best Television News Program	Won
2013	7th UPLB Gandingan Awards	Best Morning Show and Best Morning Show Hosts	Won
2013	27th PMPC Star Awards for Television	Best Morning Show-Hall of Fame	Won
2013	27th PMPC Star Awards for Television	Best Morning Show Hosts	Nominated
2013	11th Gawad Tanglaw	Best Morning Show-Hall of Fame	Won
2013	8th COMGUILD Awards	Best Morning Show	Won
2012	26th PMPC Star Awards for Television	Best Morning Show and Best Morning Show Hosts	Won
2012	10th Gawad Tanglaw	Best Morning Show	Won
2012	6th UPLB Gandingan Awards	Best Morning Show and Best Morning Show Hosts	Won
2011	25th PMPC Star Awards for Television	Best Morning Show and Best Morning Show Hosts	Won
2011	5th UPLB Gandingan Awards	Best Morning Show and Best Morning Show Hosts	Won
2011	9th Gawad Tanglaw	Best Morning Show	Won
2010	Anak TV Seal Awards	Most Admired Morning Show	Won
2010	24th PMPC Star Awards for Television	Best Morning Show and Best Morning Show Host/s	Won
2010	1st Media Newser Philippines Awards	Best Morning Show and Best Morning Show Host/s	Won
2010	8th Gawad Tanglaw	Best Morning Show and Best Morning Show Host/s	Won
2010	4th UPLB Gandingan Awards	Best Morning Show	Won
2009	23rd PMPC Star Awards for Television	Best Morning Show and Best Morning Show Host/s	Won
2009	Golden Dove Awards For Television	Best Morning Show	Won
2009	7th Gawad Tanglaw	Best Morning Show	Won
2009	3rd UPLB Gandingan Awards	Best Morning Show	Won
2008	6th Gawad Tanglaw	Best Morning Show	Won

== See also ==
- List of programs broadcast by ABS-CBN
