= Kuha Mo! =

2019–20 Philippine television program

- Title card
- Genre: Documentary; News magazine
- Directed by: Jerome Dela Cruz; Nonie Sales; Rey Ngo
- Presented by: Anthony Taberna
- Country of origin: Philippines
- Original language: Filipino
- No. of episodes: 53 (final)

Production
- Executive producer: Nico Borres Regino
- Camera setup: Multiple-camera setup
- Production company: ABS-CBN News and Current Affairs

Original release
- Network: ABS-CBN
- Release: April 27, 2019 – May 2, 2020
- Network: Kapamilya Channel
- Release: June 13 – July 25, 2020

Related
- Kuha All!; Kuha 5!

Kuha Mo! (transl. get it!) is a Philippine television public service show broadcast by ABS-CBN and Kapamilya Channel. Hosted by Anthony Taberna, it aired on the network's Yes Weekend Saturday afternoon line up from April 27, 2019, to July 25, 2020, replacing DocuCentral Presents.

== Overview ==
Kuha Mo! is the latest addition to ABS-CBN Integrated News' informative and advocacy-driven programming that aims to raise public awareness of stories and issues caught on camera. Hosted by Anthony Taberna, one of ABS-CBN's proactive personalities, Kuha Mo! does not stop with just featuring the story of our case studies but extends to help individuals who may need assistance or support regarding their situation.

== Production ==
On November 16, 2019, Kuha Mo! was pre-empted by the UAAP Season 82 Men's Basketball Finals on ABS-CBN.

From March 21 to May 2, 2020, Kuha Mo! temporarily suspended its production of the new episodes and aired re-runs due to the enhanced community quarantine in Luzon caused by the COVID-19 pandemic and ABS-CBN stopped its free-to-air broadcast operations as ordered by the National Telecommunications Commission (NTC) due to the lapsing of the network's legislative franchise. As a result, the program released new episodes through digital platforms.

Kuha Mo! returned on-air via pay television network Kapamilya Channel from June 13 to July 25, 2020. Its reruns ended after Anthony Taberna transferred to All TV and DZRH.

== Accolades ==
Year	Award	Category	Recipient / Nominated work	Result	Ref.
2019	33rd PMPC Star Awards for Television	Best Documentary Program	Kuha Mo!	Nominated	
2019	33rd PMPC Star Awards for Television	Best Documentary Program Host	Anthony Taberna	Nominated	
2020	3rd Gawad Lasallianeta	Most Outstanding Public Affairs Show	Kuha Mo!	Nominated	
2020	3rd Gawad Lasallianeta	Most Outstanding Public Affairs Show Host	Anthony Taberna	Nominated	
