= Zenaida Seva =

Filipino astrologer

- Died: March 21, 2024
- Other name: Karma Karissima
- Occupation: Astrologer
- Employer(s): ABS-CBN; Manila Standard; Tempo
- Television: Umagang Kay Ganda

Zenaida Seva was a Filipino astrologer affiliated with the television network ABS-CBN.

== Background ==
Seva was a mainstay at the ABS-CBN morning show Umagang Kay Ganda where she gave daily astrology forecast for the programming's audience. She would also guest at TV Patrol annually as part of New Year's Day observances to give similar forecast for the whole year.

She also provided astrology forecast for the broadsheet publication, Manila Standard. In the 1980s, Seva wrote for the tabloid Tempo under the pseudonym "Karma Karissima".

Through the account of her writer friend Jessica Zafra, Seva is said to need only a person's exact birth details, writing materials, and an ephemeris to "tell a person's story"; she reportedly was not fond of strangers asking her to forecast their future as she insisted that she has no such ability. Zafra informed the public that Seva died on March 21, 2024.
