= Iba-Balita Ngayon =

- Genre: News program
- Created by: ABS-CBN Corporation/Studio 23
- Developed by: ABS-CBN News and Current Affairs
- Presented by: Lynda Jumilla; Tony Velasquez
- Country of origin: Philippines
- Original language: Tagalog
- No. of episodes: n/a (airs daily)

Production
- Camera setup: Multiple-camera setup
- Running time: 30 minutes

Original release
- Network: Studio 23
- Release: March 7, 2011 – August 3, 2012

Related
- Iba-Balita

Iba-Balita Ngayon is a Philippine television news broadcasting show broadcast by Studio 23. The newscasts is spin-off to Iba-Balita. Hosted by Lynda Jumilla and Tony Velasquez, it aired from March 7, 2011, to August 3, 2012, replacing Power Rangers Jungle Fury. The newscasts pitting up against GMA News TV's Balitanghali and TV5's Balitaang Tapat.

== Anchors ==
- Tony Velasquez
- Lynda Jumilla

== See also ==
- List of programs broadcast by Studio 23
- ABS-CBN News and Current Affairs
- Iba-Balita
- TV Patrol
- Bandila
