= Rush TV =

Filipino TV show

- Created by: Moomoo Productions Inc.
- Developed by: Studio 23
- Starring: see hosts
- Country of origin: Philippines
- Original language: Filipino

Production
- Executive producer: Leo Katigbak
- Camera setup: multicamera setup
- Running time: 1 hour

Original release
- Network: Studio 23
- Release: August 2007 – 2008

Rush TV is a primetime show aired on Studio 23 from August 2007 to 2008. It is basically a variety show, the main difference perhaps is that half the show is packed with segments made by students from the top universities and colleges in and around Metro Manila.

== Synopsis ==
The first step was to go to all the universities and colleges and look for students who wanted to shake things up. Once they are found, those students, are brought together for a gruelling barrage of gimmicks, parties, get-togethers, training sessions and workshops. Then milked these students for topics and subjects that interested them. The next part was to shoot segments, and the various Student Teams shot these segments and assembled them. Now, all that remains is to stage a huge party in some school and call it a shoot, to round off the rest of the episode.

== Hosts ==
- Mico Aytona
- Say Alonzo
- Roxanne Barcelo
- Joaqui Mendoza
- Dino Imperial
- Bianca Manalo
- Sam YG
- Kamae de Jesus

== Participating schools ==
The member campuses are as follows:

- Asia Pacific College
- Ateneo de Manila University
- Colegio de San Juan de Letran
- De La Salle University
- De La Salle-College of Saint Benilde
- Far Eastern University
- National University (Philippines)
- Polytechnic University of the Philippines
- Technological University of the Philippines-Manila
- University of Asia and the Pacific
- University of Santo Tomas
- University of the Philippines Diliman

== See also ==
- List of programs aired by Studio 23
- Studio 23
