= Kuha All! =

2022–24 Philippine television program

- Genre: Documentary; News magazine
- Presented by: Anthony Taberna
- Country of origin: Philippines
- Original language: Filipino
- No. of episodes: 73

Production
- Camera setup: Multiple-camera setup
- Running time: 1 hour
- Production company: Outbox Media Powerhouse Corporation

Original release
- Network: All TV
- Release: November 26, 2022 – April 14, 2024

Related
- Kuha Mo! Kuha 5!

Kuha All! (transl. Get All!) is a Philippine television public service show broadcast by All TV. Hosted by Anthony Taberna, it aired from November 26, 2022 to April 14, 2024.

== Segments ==
- Kuha Rin! - highlights snippets of the latest and trending videos.
- Kaya All! - a featured case study is assisted through any means of support needed to resolve the issue being discussed.
- Kuha Mo? - Taberna's no-holds-barred commentary on the subject at hand.

== Production ==
Kuha All! is very similar to Anthony Taberna's former program, Kuha Mo!, which was previously cancelled in 2020 by ABS-CBN along with all the current affairs programs as a result of the network's shutdown and permanent loss of broadcast franchise followed by the company's retrenchment layoffs.

Taberna signed contract with All TV on September 6, 2022. He admitted that he accepted the offer to host this program due to network's significant talent fee.
