= Quizon Avenue =

- Title card
- Genre: Sketch comedy
- Created by: ABS-CBN Studios
- Written by: Eric Quizon
- Directed by: Epy Quizon
- Starring: Dolphy
- Country of origin: Philippines
- Original language: Filipino
- No. of episodes: 71

Production
- Running time: 60 minutes

Original release
- Network: ABS-CBN
- Release: March 5, 2005 – July 22, 2006

Quizon Avenue is a Philippine television sketch comedy show broadcast by ABS-CBN. It stars Dolphy, Eric Quizon, Epy Quizon, Vandolph Quizon, Kitkat, Ya Chang, Pokwang and Jenny Hernandez, it aired on the network's Saturday evening line up from March 5, 2005 to July 22, 2006, replacing Home Along da Airport and was replaced by John en Shirley.

== Cast ==
- Dolphy
- Eric Quizon
- Epy Quizon
- Vandolph Quizon
- Pokwang
- Kitkat
- Ya Chang
- Redford White
- Jeni Hernandez

== Guests ==
- Homer Flores (as Brian Cayugyug, a parody of Ryan Cayabyab)
- Zsa Zsa Padilla
- Sandara Park
- Hero Angeles
- Joross Gamboa
- Roxanne Guinoo
- Eddie Garcia
- Maricel Soriano
- Sarah Geronimo
- Rachelle Ann Go
- Willie Nepomuceno

== Notable scenes ==
- Ya Chang sings "Ako'y Isang Pinoy", but before he sings the second stanza, was caught by Bureau of Immigration officers.
- When Dolphy sings some songs like "Si Aida, si Lorna o si Fe" or any song that has a woman's name, Zsa Zsa Padilla will confront him about women.
- When his sons cracks some punchlines, Dolphy applies slapstick by bashing them with rolled newspapers and empty plastic bottles.

== Awards ==
- Winner, Best Comedy Program - 2006 Catholic Mass Media Awards
- Nominated, Best Gag Show - 20th PMPC Star Awards for Television 2006
