= Epy Quizon =

Filipino actor, host and comedian

Jeffrey Quizon
- Born: Jeffrey Smith Quizon; Manila, Philippines
- Other names: Epi Quizon; Jeff
- Education: De La Salle University
- Occupations: Actor; comedian; host
- Years active: 1989–present
- Parents: Dolphy (father); Pamela Ponti (mother)
- Relatives: Eric Quizon (brother); Ronnie Quizon (brother); Vandolph Quizon (half-brother); Freddie Quizon (half-brother); Rolly Quizon (half-brother); Zia Quizon (half-sister)

Jeffrey "Epy" Smith Quizon is a Filipino actor, television host and the son of comedian Dolphy.

== Early life and background ==
Jeffrey Smith Quizon is the youngest of four siblings. He is the son of former actress Pamela Ponti (real name Alice Smith) with Dolphy. He studied at De La Salle University but discontinued his studies in 1996, leaving only his thesis incomplete.

== Career ==
Quizon, he stars in the 2026 television drama series Love Is Never Gone, portraying the character Alonzo Crisanto portrayed father character Joshua Garcia. and dominated the 12th Emirates Film Festival held in Dubai in July 2026. He returns to comedy and legacy television in Home Along da Riles: Da Reunion.

== Personal life ==
Quizon he later returned to fulfill the remaining academic requirements and graduated in February 2026, nearly 30 years after he had first paused his education.

== Filmography ==
=== Film ===
Year	Title	Role
1990	Og Must Be Crazy	
1992	Unang Tibok Ng Puso	
1994	Wanted: Perfect Mother	
1995	Father en Son	Maru
1998	Tataynic	
2000	Markova: Comfort Gay	Young Walter Dempster Jr.
2001	Radyo	Reuben
2001	Bakit 'Di Totohanin	Andrew
2002	Utang ni Tatang	Rick
2002	Bakit Papa?	Jake
2002	Home Along Da Riber	Bar Bum
2003	Lastikman	Stryker / Jepoy
2003	Asboobs: Asal Bobo	Del Pilar
2003	Captain Barbell	Utoy / Dagampatay
2004	Astigmatism	Victim 2
2004	Quezon City	Carlo
2004	Enteng Kabisote: Okay ka, Fairy Ko: The Legend	Romero
2005	Ang Anak ni Brocka	
2005	Boso	Jake
2005	Pepot Artista	Tirso
2005	Pinoy/Blonde	Andrew
2005	Lasponggols	
2005	Enteng Kabisote 2: Okay Ka Fairy Ko... The Legend Continues!	Kidlat
2006	Nasaan si Francis?	Francis
2006	Rotonda	
2007	Agent X44	Karansai Purubutu-san
2007	Nothing Funnier Than Unhappiness	
2007	Maikling Kuwento	
2008	Urduja	Daisuke (voice)
2008	Dobol Trobol: Lets Get Redi 2 Rambol!	Epi
2009	Ang Beerhouse	
2009	Pinoy Sunday	Manuel dela Cruz
2009	Nobody, Nobody But... Juan	Young Juan
2011	Dagaw	
2012	Corazon: Ang Unang Aswang	Naldo
2012	My Naughty Kid: Huwag Kang Pasaway	Angelito de la Hoya
2012	El Presidente	Jose Zulueta
2012	Sisterakas	Rafael Sabroso
2014	Unlucky Plaza	Onassis Hernandez
2015	Heneral Luna	Apolinario Mabini
2015	Angela Markado	Troy
2016	Enteng Kabisote 10 and the Abangers	Dr. Kwak Kwak
2018	Goyo: Ang Batang Heneral	Apolinario Mabini
2018	The Trigonal	Dodoy
2018	Unli Life	Rodolfo "Dolphy" Quizon
2019	The Art of Ligaw	Jake
2021	Princess DayaReese	King Amala
2022	An Inconvenient Love	Filemon
2023	Firefly	Louie Alcantara
2023	Voltes V: Legacy – The Cinematic Experience	Zuhl
2023	GomBurZa	Don Joaquin Pardo de Tavera
2026	Tayo sa Wakas	Mr. G
2026	Home Along Da Riles Da Reunion	Cameo

=== Television ===
Year	Title	Role
2023	Voltes V: Legacy	Zuhl
2023	Dirty Linen	Ador Pavia
2023–2024	Pira-Pirasong Paraiso	Badong Abiog
2024	Black Rider	Sonny
2024	3-in-1	Chino Liberica
2024	Pulang Araw	Julio Borromeo
2025	Incognito	Sameo Patel
2026	Love Is Never Gone	Alonzo Crisanto
2026	The Loyalty Game	

- That's Entertainment (1989–1996) - Himself/Thursday group member & co-host
- Gabi ni Dolphy (1992)
- Purungtong (1992)
- Lovingly Yours (1993)
- Mikee (1995)
- Spotlight Drama Specials (1995)
- Mikee Forever (1995)
- GMA Love Stories (1996)
- Dear Mikee (1998)
- Lihim Ng Gabi (1998)
- Mula sa Puso (1998)
- Campus Romance (1999)
- Maalaala Mo Kaya (1999)
- GMA Telecine Specials (2000)
- Kagat ng Dilim (2000)
- Biglang Sibol, Bayang Impasibol (2001–2002)
- Daboy en Da Girl (2002) - Emoks
- Road Trip (2003) - co-host
- Maynila (2005)
- Art Jam (2005) - host
- Mathinik (2005)
- Estyudantipid (Knowledge Channel Philippines, 2005)
- Laff To Laff: Ang Kulit (2005)
- Quizon Avenue (2005–2006)
- Project 11 (2006)
- Komiks (2006)
- Alpha Omega Girl (2006)
- Mga Kuwento ni Lola Basyang (2007)
- Ang Walong Bulag (2007)
- Sabi Ni Nanay (2007) - guest
- Camera Café (2008–2009)
- Dyosa (2008–2009) - Bakus
- Maynila (2009)
- Ful Haus (2009) - Je
- Talentadong Pinoy (2009)
- Zorro (2009) - Shihong
- Full House (2009) - Jerry
- Pidol's Wonderland (2010)
- Showtime (2010) - Guest Judge
- Imortal (2010) - young Abraham Villamor
- My Driver Sweet Lover (2010) - Jimrod
- Kakambal ni Eliana (2013)
- Juan dela Cruz (2013) - Franco
- Kahit Nasaan Ka Man (2013) - Paulo de Chavez
- Wanspanataym (2013)
- Aha! (2013)
- The Ryzza Mae Show (2014)
- Wasak (2014) - guest
- Matanglawin (2014)
- Boys Ride Out (2014)
- Bogart Case Files (2015) - guest
- Kapamilya Deal or No Deal Briefcase #13 (2015)
- Ipaglaban Mo: Nasaan Ang Konsensya? (2015) - Ador
- Sabado Badoo (2015)
- Nathaniel (2015)
- Karelasyon (2015)
- FPJ's Ang Probinsyano (2015)
- Ipaglaban Mo: Nagkunwaring Baliw (2015) - Patricio
- Ang Panday (2016) - Ledge
- Dear Uge (2016)
- Magpakailanman (2016)
- Pepito Manaloto (2016)
- Oh My Mama (2016)
- Hay, Bahay! (2016)
- A1 Ko Sa 'Yo (2016)
- Alyas Robin Hood (2016)
- Laff Camera Action (2016)
- Home Sweetie Home (2017)
- Tsuperhero (2017) - Lamparaz
- Minute To Win It (2017)
- The Better Half (2017) - Juancho Alejo (antagonist)
- Wish Ko Lang (2017)
- Ipaglaban Mo: Bihag (2017) - Gilbert Suratos
- Super Ma'am (2017) - Jack
- Tadhana (2017)
- Wildflower (2018) - Stefano
- Inday Will Always Love You (2018) - Volta
- Hiwaga ng Kambat (2019) - Zandro Baron
- Ipaglaban Mo: Pariwara (2019) - Edgar Laserna
- Dok Ricky, Pedia (2019) - Martin
- The Gift (2019) - Gabriel
- Quizon CT (2022) - Himself
- Flower of Evil (2022) - Noel Ramirez
- Running Man Philippines (2022) - guest

=== Director ===
Year	Title	Notes	Ref.
2021	Bukal	Also as Producer	

=== Assistant director ===
Year	Title	Notes
1997	Langit sa Piling Mo	credited as Epy Quizon
1998	Pagdating ng Panahon	credited as Epy Quizon
1999	Ms. Kristina Moran: Ang Babaeng Palaban	credited as Jeffrey Quizon

=== Movie producer ===
Year	Title	Notes
2006	Nassan si Francis?	credited as Epy Quizon

=== Movie screenplay ===
Year	Title	Notes
1998	Pagdating ng Panahon	credited as Jeffrey Quizon
1999	Ms. Kristina Moran: Ang Babaeng Palaban	credited as Jeffrey Quizon

=== TV writer ===
Year	Title	Notes
2005	Quizon Avenue	credited as Epy Quizon

== Accolades ==
Year	Award-Giving Body	Category	Work	Result
2000	Metro Manila Film Festival	Best Supporting Actor	Markova: Comfort Gay	Won
2021	Indie Short Fest	Best Producer	Bukal	Won
2021	Indie Short Fest	Outstanding Achievement Award for a First-Time Director	Bukal	Won
