= Aalog-Alog =

2006 Philippine television sitcom series

- Genre: Sitcom
- Created by: Randy Santiago
- Directed by: Randy L. Santiago
- Starring: Keanna Reeves; Jayson Gainza; Pokwang; John Prats; Zanjoe Marudo; Kim Chiu; Gerald Anderson; Ya Chang; Sammy Lagmay; Bentong
- Theme music composer: Randy Santiago
- Opening theme: "Kakabog-Kabog" by Willie Revillame
- Country of origin: Philippines
- Original language: Filipino
- No. of episodes: 43

Production
- Running time: 60 minutes

Original release
- Network: ABS-CBN
- Release: July 8, 2006 – May 5, 2007

Aalog-Alog (English: Shaking) is a Philippine television sitcom series broadcast by ABS-CBN. Directed by Randy L. Santiago, it stars Keanna Reeves, Jayson Gainza,Pokwang, John Prats, Zanjoe Marudo, Kim Chiu, Gerald Anderson, Ya Chang, Sammy Lagmay and Bentong. It aired on the network's Saturday evening line up from July 8, 2006 to May 5, 2007. The title comes from the Filipino word for "shaking or jiggling back forth" and it can be explained in one of the setting's two houses which leans from side to side like a rocking chair.

== Cast and characters ==
=== Main cast ===
- Pokwang as Doña Etang Sukimura
- Keanna Reeves as Keana Padilla

=== Supporting cast ===
- Kim Chiu as Kim Sukimura
- John Prats as Johnny Montero
- Zanjoe Marudo as Banjoe Rosales
- Gerald Anderson as Gerald Dean Padilla
- Jayson Gainza as Jayson Santiago
- Bentong† as Utoy
- Sammy Lagmay† as Chairman Hero
- Ya Chang as Sandaro Yamamoto

== Director ==
Former noontime show host/singer and current businessman Randy Santiago directed the show. It was his first time to direct a situational comedy show. He also co-directed the Lenten specials of Magandang Tanghali Bayan with Bobet Vidanes from 1999 to 2002. His first directorial break was in the GMA noontime show "Salo-Salo Together (SST)" (1993–1995) and also assisted his dad, the famous Pablo Santiago in directing some movies in the 1980s. He is also known as the owner of the successful chain of Ratsky bar and restaurant.

Aalog-alog was composed of a fun production team headlined by executive producer Jose Antonio Guillero, associate producer Janice Señorin and production assistants Ana Katrina Bañez, Elisa Guinmapang and Katrina Juban. Ricky Victoria serves as the head writer, Rolf Mahilom, Sherwin Buenvenida, Fudgr Deleon and Josel Garlitos completes the creative team.
