= Bentong (comedian) =

Filipino comedian (1964–2019)

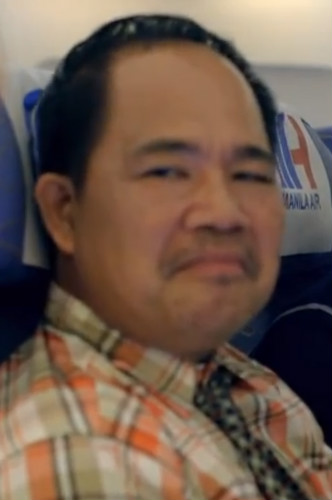
- Bentong as "Macoy" in 2014 horror film Shake, Rattle & Roll XV
- Born: Domingo Vusotros Brotamante Jr. January 12, 1964; Tabaco, Albay, Philippines
- Died: February 9, 2019 (aged 55); Quezon City, Metro Manila, Philippines
- Resting place: Forest Lawn Memorial Park, Rodriguez, Rizal
- Citizenship: Filipino
- Employer: ABS-CBN
- Spouse: Cecille Bernal
- Children: 4

Domingo Vusotros Brotamante Jr. (January 12, 1964 – February 9, 2019), known professionally as Bentong and previously as Boyet Brotamante, was a Filipino comedian, actor, and television host.

== Early life ==
Bentong was born in Tabaco, Albay, Philippines on January 12, 1964.

== Career ==
Bentong started his career in showbiz as a production assistant at ABS-CBN. One of his earlier film roles was as Hilary's driver in Home Along da Riles da Movie and since then made several cameos in other films, initially credited as Boyet Brotamante. His other roles in film was as Juanito in the 2002 film Jologs and Macoy in the 2014 horror anthology film Shake, Rattle & Roll XV. He was also part of the cast of the 2008 film One Night Only.

He also played roles in numerous variety shows of the television network namely Wowowee and Magandang Tanghali Bayan. Bentong became known for being the co-host of Willie Revillame in the latter's noontime television shows. One of his known later television appearances was in Luv U which aired from 2012 to 2016 where he portrayed the character Mang Jules.

Bentong also made an appearance in an episode of GMA Network's Wagas which featured his love story with his spouse Cecille Bernal which also featured commentaries from himself and his wife.

== Personal life ==
Bentong was married to Cecille Bernal and had four children. He was also a diabetic.

== Death ==
Bentong suffered from a cardiac arrest on February 9, 2019. He was rushed to the Fairview General Hospital in Quezon City, where he was declared dead on arrival at around 5:00 a.m. PHT, as announced by his son-in-law. He was laid to rest at Forest Lawn Memorial Park in Rodriguez, Rizal.

== Filmography ==
=== Film ===
Year	Title	Role
1993	Home Along Da Riles da Movie	Hillary's Driver
1999	Oo Na... Mahal Na Kung Mahal	Barkada
2000	Pera o Bayong (Not da TV)	Morkon
2001	Baliktaran: Si Ace at si Daisy	Neighbor
2002	Jologs	Juanito
2002	Ikaw Lamang Hanggang Ngayon	Jojo
2008	One Night Only	Manong Roger
2009	Nobody, Nobody But... Juan	Himself
2011	The Adventures of Pureza: Queen of the Riles	Nene
2014	Shake, Rattle & Roll XV	Macoy

=== Television ===
Year	Title	Role
1999–2000	Tarajing Potpot	Diego
2000	Maalaala Mo Kaya: Singsing	
2002–2003	Arriba, Arriba!	Steven
2005–2006	Bora	Totong
2006	Star Magic Presents	
2006–2007	Aalog-Alog	Utoy
2012	Toda Max	Ben Chan
2012–2016	Luv U	Mang Jules
2016	Wagas	Himself
