= List of programs broadcast by ABS-CBN Sports and Action =

This is a list of programs broadcast by S+A, a defunct free-to-air and internationally carried sports and action channel owned by ABS-CBN Corporation that replaced Studio 23 which was closed on January 17, 2014. The channel ceased its broadcast on May 5, 2020, following the National Telecommunications Commission's issuance of cease-and-desist order against ABS-CBN from operating its TV and radio stations due to expiration of the latter's legislative franchise.

== Final broadcast ==
=== Sports ===
==== Basketball ====
- MPBL (2018–2020)
- 2019–20 ABL season (2019–2020)

==== Boxing ====
- Pinoy Pride (2010–2014, 2014–2020) (in cooperation with ALA Promotions)

==== Collegiate sports ====
- UAAP (2000–2014, 2014–2020)
- NCAA (2002–2011, 2015–2020)

==== Volleyball ====
- Premier Volleyball League (2017–2020)

==== Beach Volleyball ====
- Beach Volleyball Republic (2015–2019)

==== Mixed martial arts / Jiu-jitsu ====
- Abu Dhabi Grand Slam (2018-2020)
- ONE Championship (2016–2020)
- Karate Combat (2018–2020)
- United Fight Alliance ^{**}
- Hado Pilipinas (2019–2020)

==== Cockfighting ====
- Sabong Pilipinas (2018–2020)
- Sabong TV (2014–2020)
- Sagupaan (2014–2020)

==== Motoring ====
- Mobil 1 The Grid (2017–2020)
- Ride Mo To (2018–2020)
- Rev (2020)
- The Grid ^{**}
- Autospeed ^{**}

==== Strongman ====
- Strongman Champions League ^{**}

=== Sports news ===
- The Score (2014–2020)
- S+A First Five ^{**}

=== Sports magazine ===
- University Town (Season 3) (2016–2020)
- Beyond The Game (2016–2020)
- Sports U (2015–2020)
- Gillette World Sport (2017–2020)
- Upfront (2015–2020)

=== Travel/business/health/lifestyle ===
- Agri TV: Hayop Ang Galing! (2014–2020)
- Asenso Pinoy TV (2013–2014, 2014–2020)
- RX Plus (2009–2014, 2014–2020)
- Ating Alamin ^{**}
- Team FitFil (2020)

=== Religious shows ===
- Friends Again (2008–2014, 2014–2020)
- The Word Exposed with Luis Antonio Cardinal Tagle (2011–2014, 2014–2020)
- Kapamilya Daily Mass (2020, delayed telecast on S+A & Jeepney TV, also simulcasted on ABS-CBN & DZMM TeleRadyo)
  - Sunday TV Mass: The Healing Eucharist (2014; 2020, delayed telecast aired on S+A, been continued airing on ABS-CBN)

=== Infomercials ===
- O Shopping (2013–2014, 2019–2020, aired from Mondays to Saturdays at 5am to 6am, Sundays at 6am to 7am & daily from 12mn to 1am)

== Previously aired ==
=== News ===
- News plus (2014)

=== News updates ===
- Fast Break (2014–2017)

=== Sports ===
- FIVB World Grand Prix (2014)
- J. League Highlights (2014)
- UAAP Season 76 Football (2014)
- UAAP Season 76 Men's Volleyball (2014)
- UAAP Season 76 Women's Volleyball (2014)
- Ultimate Fighting Championship (2005–2014, 2014–2015; now broadcast on Disney+)
- UEFA Champions League (2012–2014, 2014)
- UEFA Europa League (2012–2013, 2014)
- Universal Reality Combat Championship (2016–2018)
- US Open (2008–2013, 2016; broadcast on Fox Sports from 2017 until 2021 and now broadcast on SPOTV)
- World Wrestling Entertainment (discontinued; now broadcast on Netflix)
  - WWE NXT (2011–2014, 2014)
  - WWE Raw (2011–2014, 2014)
  - WWE Tough Enough (2014)
  - WWE Superstars (2010–2014, 2014)

=== Sports magazine ===
- Euro Tour Highlights (2014)
- NBA Inside Stuff
- Road to Rio (2014)
- UEFA Europa League Magazine Show (2014)

=== Sports specials ===
- Davis Cup Asia/Oceania Zone Group II 2nd Round: Philippines vs. Pakistan (April 11–13, 2014)
- 2017 Asian Women's Volleyball Championship (August 9–17, 2017)
- 2014 AFC Challenge Cup (May 20–31, 2014)
- 2019 Southeast Asian Games (November 30, 2019 – December 11, 2019)
- ABS-CBN Sports presents Top Rank Boxing (2009–2014, 2014–2017)
- Cobra Energy Drink 70.3 Ironman 70.3 Philippines (2011–2013, 2014–2019)
- Duelo sa Mexico: Merlito Sabillo vs. Francisco Rodriguez (March 23, 2014)
- ICTSI: The Country Club Invitational (March 15, 2014)
- Julio Cesar Chavez Jr. vs. Bryan Vera Fight (March 2, 2014)
- Fight of Champions: Manny Pacquiao vs. Lucas Matthysse Fight (July 15, 2018)
- Mikey Garcia vs. Juan Carlos Burgos Fight (January 26, 2014)
- NBA Games (2011–2014, 2014–2019; now broadcast on RPTV, One Sports, NBA TV Philippines, Disney+ and Prime Video)
  - NBA All Star Weekend 2014 New Orleans
  - BBVA Rising Stars Challenge (February 15, 2014)
  - State Farm All Star Saturday Night (February 16, 2014)
  - NBA All Star Game (February 17, 2014)
  - NBA Action (2011–2014, 2014–2019)
  - NBA All-Star Weekend (2011–2013, 2014–2019)
  - NBA Playoffs (2011–2013, 2014–2019)
  - NBA Finals (2011–2013, 2014–2019)
- Olivarez Cup: 2014 Philippine International Tennis Open (March 29–31, 2014)
- Philippine Azkals Friendly Game vs. Malaysian Tigers II (March 1, 2014)
- Philippine Azkals Friendly Game vs. Azerbaijan (March 4, 2014)
- Philippine Azkals Friendly Game vs. Malaysian Tigers II (April 27, 2014)
- Pinoy Pride 24: The Future Is Now: Genesis Servania vs. Alexander Munoz (March 2, 2014)
- Ring of Gold: Shiming vs. Kokietgym; Marvin Sonsona vs. Akifumi Shimoda (February 23, 2014)
- The Masters (2002–2013, 2014–2019) (under Fox Sports Asia)
- UAAP Men's Baseball Finals: Ateneo vs. La Salle (February 18, 21 & 24, 2014)
- UAAP Men's Football Finals: FEU vs. UP (February 20 & 23, 2014)
- UAAP Men's Volleyball Finals: Ateneo vs. NU (March 1 & 4, 2014)
- UAAP Women's Volleyball Finals: La Salle vs. Ateneo (March 5, 8 & 12, 2014)
- UAAP Women's Softball Finals: NU vs. Adamson (February 25, 2014)
- UAAP Women's Football Finals: FEU vs. UST (February 20, 2014; February 23, 2014)
- UAAP Men's Tennis Finals (February 17, 2014)
- UAAP Season 80 Greats Documentary Special (September 9, 2017)
- UAAP Season 81 Men's Basketball Finals: UP vs. Ateneo (December 1 & 5, 2018)
- UFC 169: Barao vs. Faber II (February 2, 2014)
- UFC 170: Rousey vs. Mcmann (February 23, 2014)
- UFC 171: Hendricks vs. Lawler (March 16, 2014)
- UFC Fight Night: Abu Dhabi (April 12, 2014)
- UFC Fight Night: Macau (March 2, 2014)
- UNDP Football Match against Poverty for the benefit of Typhoon Yolanda Survivors (March 9, 2014)
- Vaseline Men Xterra Philippines Triathlon Championship (2011–2013, 2014)
- Welterweight Supremacy: Manny Pacquiao vs. Keith Thurman Fight (July 21, 2019)
- WWE Elimination Chamber (February 25, 2014)
- WWE Royal Rumble (January 28, 2014)
- World Series by Renault (April 13, 2014)

=== Election coverage ===
- Halalan 2016: Ipanalo ang Pamilyang Pilipino (May 9−10, 2016)
- Halalan 2019: Ipanalo: Boses ng Pilipino (May 13−14, 2019)

=== Specials ===
- Araw ng Dabaw Special Coverage (March 15, 2014; only aired on ABS-CBN S+A 21 Davao)
- Miss Cebu (2014, 2015–2020, only aired on ABS-CBN S+A 23 Cebu)
- Pantawid ng Pag-ibig: At Home Together Concert (March 22, 2020) (together with ABS-CBN, ANC, Jeepney TV, DZMM Radyo Patrol 630, DZMM Teleradyo, Metro Channel, Asianovela Channel, MOR Philippines, iWant, and TFC)
- The Football Warriors of Tacloban: UNDP Shortfilm (March 2014)

=== Reality ===
- Driven to Extremes (2014)
- Freedom Riders Asia (2014)
- GT Academy (2014)
- The Ultimate Fighter: Team Jones vs. Team Sonnen (2014)

=== Documentary ===
- Friday's Action Pack
  - When Good Pets Gone Bad (2014)
  - When Stunts Go Bad (2014)
  - World's Deadliest Sea Creatures (2014)
  - World's Deadliest Storms (2014)
  - World's Scariest Police Shootouts (2014)
  - World's Worst Drivers: Caught on Tape (2014)

=== Anime and Tokusatsu ===
- Little Battlers eXperience (2014)
- Metal Fight Beyblade (2014)
- Ultraman Mebius (2014)
- Power Rangers Samurai (2014)
- Nura Rise of The Yokai Clan (2014)
- Tai Chi Chasers (2014)
- Heroman (2014)
- Yu-Gi-Oh! Zexal (2014)
- Reborn (2014)

=== Informative ===
- Agribusiness: How It Works (2013–2014, 2014)

=== Comedy ===
- Kaya Mo Bang!: The Fudgee Barr Adventures (2014)

=== Religious ===
- Family Rosary Crusade (2003–2014, 2014–2018)
- Kasama Natin ang Diyos Holy Week Special (April 18, 2014)

=== Cartoon ===
- Avengers Assemble (2014)
- Bubble Guppies (seasons 1 and 2) (2014)
- Dora the Explorer (2013–2014, 2014)
- Go, Diego Go! (2014)
- Hazbin Hotel (2019)
- Helluva Boss (2019)
- Marvel Knights (2014)
- Spider-Man Unlimited (2014)
- Supa Strikas (2014)
- Team Umizoomi (seasons 1 to 3) (2014)
- Thomas & Friends (seasons 12 to 16) (2013–2014, 2014)
- Spider-Man and His Amazing Friends (2014)
- Silver Surfer (2014)
- The Spectacular Spider-Man (2014)
- The Super Hero Squad Show (2014–2016)
- Transformers Animated (2014–2020)
- Voltron (2014)
- Voltron Force (2014)

=== Movie Blocks ===
- Action Movie Zone (2014−2017)
- Lunch Blockbusters (2014−2017)
- FPJ: Kampeon ng Aksyon (2014−2017)

== See also ==
- S+A (defunct)
- ABS-CBN Sports
- Liga

== Notes ==
1. Available in both Free TV and International.
2. Available only thru S+A International.
