= Nobody, Nobody But... Juan =

- Directed by: Enrico S. Quizon
- Written by: Enrico S. Quizon; Bibeth Orteza
- Produced by: Rodolfo V. Quizon; Enrico S. Quizon; Joseph Aldeguer
- Starring: Dolphy; Eddie Garcia; Gloria Romero; Pokwang
- Cinematography: Ricardo Jose Trofeo Jr.
- Edited by: Sheryll Lopez
- Music by: Von De Guzman
- Production companies: RVQ Productions; Kaizz Ventures Inc.; Joe Aldeguer Productions
- Release date: December 25, 2009 (MMFF)
- Country: Philippines
- Language: Filipino
- Budget: ₱15 million
- Box office: ₱31.9 million (Official 2009 MMFF run) ₱32 million (Official Domestic run)

Nobody, Nobody But... Juan is a Philippine comedy film released on December 25, 2009, as an entry to the 2009 Metro Manila Film Festival. The title is a take on the Wonder Girls song "Nobody".

== Plot ==
Juan lives in a nursing home in the United States run by his son Mario and daughter-in-law Jane. His favorite pastime is watching the variety show Wowowee on The Filipino Channel. Beside wanting to reconnect with the Philippines, Juan is lonesome for his first love Aida, with whom he lost touch during the Japanese occupation of Manila, with Wowowee being his way of coping with these. He creates trouble if he fails to watch an episode day, in cahoots with fellow residents, Filipino or American. He also has a son, who is a womanizer and has many children out of wedlock.

When Mario bans Wowowee after an incident, Juan takes drastic measures to watch his favorite TV program, from staging riots to hunger strikes. The last straw comes when he leaves the home and is caught by authorities. He decides to return to the Philippines with only his passport, plane tickets and pocket money. After his arrival, he thwarts an attempt by a taxi driver to overcharge him, meets an American who also loves Wowowee and his wife, evade security guards at ABS-CBN offices, meet comedians Brod Pete and Long Mejia and eventually enters the Wowowee studio. In his quest, he crosses paths with his old friend Tu who used to be his partner in the vaudeville duo Juan Tu, that played satiric, slapstick and prison comedy not only for Filipinos, but also for Japanese troops. Tu now works with Lolay to embezzle money from audiences, especially foreigners by giving them "tickets" to watch Wowowee for a fee. He then meets the show’s host Willie Revillame after being dragged by dancers, after he is tricked by Long and Brod Pete to fool the guards. He tells Willie about his story, after which he sees Lolay shouting his name. Lolay introduces him to Willie again and introduces Tu. The guards see Tu and chase him down. Juan and Lolay also chase Tu. Tu hides in a restaurant, but Juan finds him and explains why he is being chased. Tu confesses that they were scalpers and he knows where Aida is, but refuses to call him Tu, but Ribio. The guards and police eventually find Tu. Tu tells the guards that he would go to his family before going to jail.

Juan is then reunited with Aida, who is revealed to have married Tu. They reveal Juan has a daughter Juana, with Aida having been pregnant during their last show before the Americans bombed Manila, including the theater they performed. Juan decides to settle in the Philippines along with Juana and his oldest son, who now works as a PR man, fulfilling his promise to Tu, who is imprisoned due to fraud, as Willie Revillame gives a message to Juan and to all his fans.

== Cast ==
- Dolphy as Juan
  - Epy Quizon as young Juan
- Eddie Garcia as Tu/Torribio
  - Vandolph Quizon as young Tu
- Gloria Romero as Aida
  - Heart Evangelista as young Aida
- Pokwang as Lolay/Lolita
- Eugene Domingo as Julie
- Lilia Cuntapay as Belmont Village Resident
- Mar Lopez as one of the elderly resident
- Eric Quizon as Mario
- G. Toengi as Jane
- Joseph Aldeguer as John
- Willie Revillame as himself
- Bentong as himself
- Ya Chang as Japanese Officer
- Sahlee Quizon as Juan's daughter, Juana
- Long Mejia as himself
- Caloy Alde as himself
- Brod Pete as himself
- Chariz Solomon as TFC Subscriber
- Richard S. Cunanan as TFC Subscriber's husband
- Keanna Reeves as the gossip monger maid
- Bearwin Meily as Security Guard
- Owen Ercia as Floor Director
- Leo Martinez as taxi driver
- Lovely Abella as Wowowee dancer
