= Anthony Taberna =

Filipino journalist and radio commentator (born 1975)

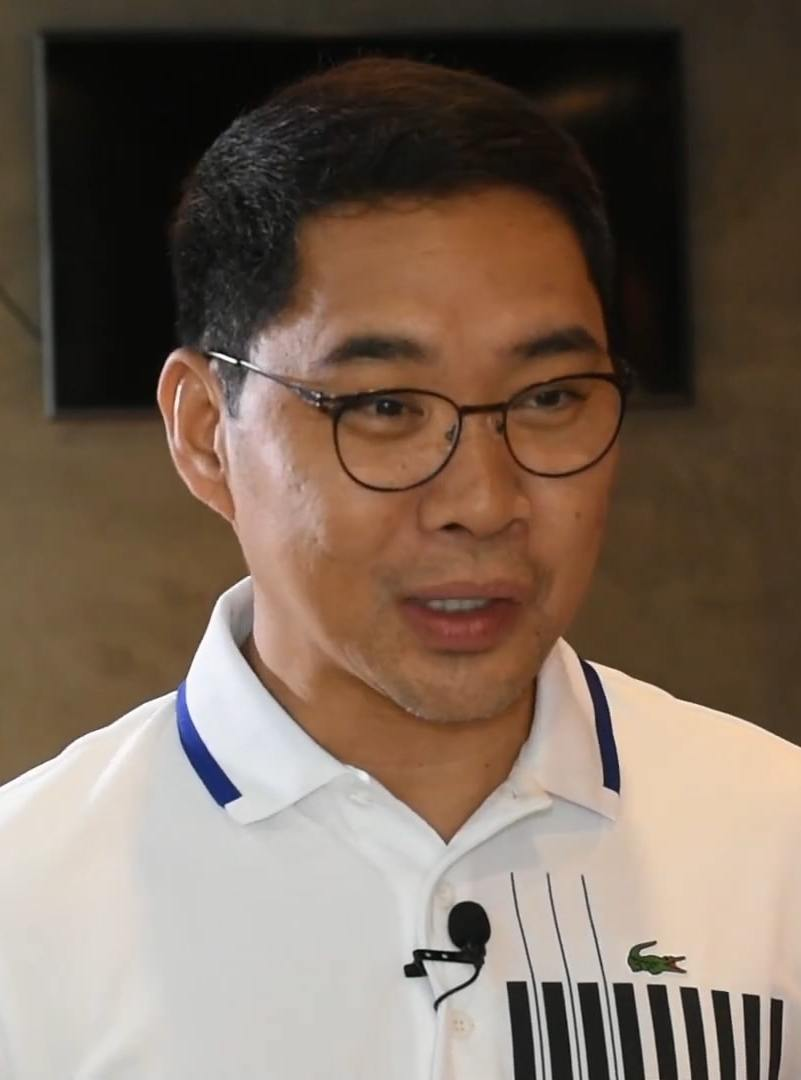
- Taberna in 2019
- Born: Antonio Talens Taberna Jr. January 16, 1975 (age 51); San Antonio, Nueva Ecija, Philippines
- Other names: Tunying, Ka Tunying
- Occupation: Journalist
- Years active: 1997–present
- Agents: ABS-CBN (1997–2020) DZRH (2020–present); ALLTV (2022–2024)
- Spouse: Rossel Velasco (m. 2008)
- Children: 2

Antonio "Anthony" Talens Taberna Jr. (born January 16, 1975), also known as Ka Tunying or Tunying, is a Filipino broadcast journalist.

At ABS-CBN, Taberna hosted television and radio programs covering news and public affairs. He is a former host of Umagang Kay Ganda (where he gained popularity in the segment "Punto por Punto") and XXX: Exklusibong, Explosibong, Exposé. As a radio anchor, Taberna is one of the lead anchors for Dos por Dos alongside Gerry Baja. He is also the former anchor of Iba-Balita and Mano Mano of Studio 23 and later News plus on S+A.

== Early life and education ==
Antonio Talens Taberna Jr. was born on January 16, 1975, in San Antonio, Nueva Ecija, the fourth of seven children. His father, Antonio Taberna Sr., was a provincial bus driver in Manila who only finished his education up until high school. His father died on August 18, 2002, after a period of ill health. His mother, Benita Talens Taberna, only finished her elementary education.

== Career ==
Taberna started his career as a part-time news writer in 1992 at DZEC, operated by Eagle Broadcasting Corporation. In 1997, he transferred to DZMM, an AM radio station owned by ABS-CBN where he became a Radyo Patrol reporter. In January 2000, he joined Gerry Baja in Ito Ang Radyo Patrol (lit. transl. This is Radio Patrol). The tandem then moved on to Gising Pilipinas (lit. transl. Wake Up, Philippines) in 2002, before they were given their own show, Dos por Dos.

As a television host, Taberna was featured on the morning show Magandang Umaga, Pilipinas and in the documentary program Kalye: Mga Kwento ng Lansangan. Taberna has been widely criticized for his rape victim-blaming on live television. A campaign to remove him from his position due to his bad ethics was met by opposition from Taberna's employer company, ABS-CBN. On July 31, 2020, Taberna left ABS-CBN due to the ABS-CBN franchise renewal controversy when the Philippine Congress rejected the new legislative franchise of the network and he subsequently joined Manila Broadcasting Company's AM radio station DZRH in August 2020 and his show Dos por Dos moved to the station and resumed airing on August 31. On September 6, 2022, Taberna joined All TV and would host the television program Kuha All!.

== Personal life ==
Taberna is married to former broadcast journalist Rossel Velasco, and they have two daughters named Zoey and Helga Taberna.

The couple are the owners of Ka Tunying's Cafe. The first branch of their coffee shop opened at Visayas Avenue in Quezon City and later expanded into other areas.

== Controversies ==
=== Iglesia Ni Cristo controversy ===
In August 2015, Anthony Taberna announced that he will take a leave of absence from his two shows on ABS-CBN, citing "conflict of interest" due to the controversy surrounding the founding family of Iglesia ni Cristo (INC). Taberna was one of the personalities who appeared in the INC members' assembly in EDSA in August 2015.

=== Remarks on rape victim ===
On February 19, 2018, a news report aired on Umagang Kay Ganda about a 19-year-old girl allegedly gang-raped after meeting up with men she chatted with online. In the background, Taberna's voice can be heard saying:

"Ito po’y hindi first time na nangyari. Napakadami nang pagkakataon na nangyari yang eyeball-eyeball na ‘yan. At ang mas delikado, nakipag-eyeball ka na nga, nakipag-inuman ka pa. ‘Yun ang problema." (transl. This isn’t the first time it has happened. There have been meet-up incidents like that. What’s more dangerous, you already met up with a stranger, you drank with them too. That’s the problem.)

Co-host Jeff Canoy tried to deflect and reminded viewers that blame should always be placed on the rapists. Taberna, however, maintained his position on the issue:

“Pasensya, dun sa biktima na ‘yun, dapat mabigyan ng katarungan. Pero eto para sa future na mga pangyayari: kapag ikaw ay babae, ‘wag kang papasok sa lungga ng mga tulisan.” (transl. I apologize to the victim, she should be given justice. But here’s advice for the future: if you’re a woman, don’t go inside a den of criminals.)

Taberna issued an apology on February 21, 2018, claiming that it was not his intention to blame the victim.

=== Fake news peddling ===
In 2021, Taberna, while criticizing senator Kiko Pangilinan and vice president Leni Robredo, publicly stated that new infrastructures recently opened by the government were projects of president Rodrigo Duterte. It was later revealed that the said projects were in fact projects of the previous administration of president Noynoy Aquino.

In October 2025, amid the flood control project controversy investigations, Taberna falsely claimed that senator Risa Hontiveros illegally inserted billions of pesos in the 2025 budget. His claim was afterwards utilized by Duterte trolls and vloggers to spread fake news against Hontiveros. Respected veteran journalists in the Philippines criticized Taberna's claims. Hontiveros has denied any bicameral insertions. Verified documents showed that Hontiveros was actually one of only two senators in the 19th Congress who voted "no" to the 2025 bicameral budget report, which was largely supported by pro-Duterte senators, refuting Taberna's claims. Taberna later recanted his claims, stating that he never said Hontiveros was corrupt, adding that Duterte supporters misrepresented his statements. Public investigations later revealed that Taberna was the first celebrity endorser of Stronghold Insurance Corp., where its director was the wife of pro-Duterte senator Rodante Marcoleta, and the insurance provider of the flood control project controversy-linked Discaya family.

== Filmography ==
=== Television ===
Year	Title	Role
1997–2020	TV Patrol	Senior correspondent
2000–2007	Alas Singko Y Medya/Magandang Umaga Bayan/Magandang Umaga, Pilipinas	Host/Anchor
2007–2020	Umagang Kay Ganda	Host
2007–present	Dos por Dos	Co-host
2008–2009	Kalye: Mga Kwento ng Lansangan	Host
2010–2013	XXX: Exklusibong, Explosibong, Exposé	Host
2010–2014	Iba-Balita	Anchor
2011–2013	Ako Ang Simula	Host
2012–2013	Pinoy True Stories – Demandahan	Host
2012–2013	Mano Mano	Host
2013–2019	Tapatan ni Tunying	Host
2014	News plus	Anchor
2017	Wildflower	Debate host
2018–2019	Pareng Partners	Co-host
2019–2020	Kuha Mo!	Host
2022–2024	Kuha All!	Host

== Radio ==
Year	Title	Role
1999–2002	Ito ang Radyo Patrol	Host
2000–present	Dos por Dos	Co-anchor
2001–2007	Gising Pilipinas	Anchor
