= Wonder Mom =

- Genre: Informative
- Developed by: ABS-CBN News and Current Affairs
- Directed by: Joel Macasa
- Presented by: Karen Davila
- Opening theme: "Wonder Mom" by Moonstar88
- Country of origin: Philippines
- Original language: Filipino
- No. of episodes: 76

Production
- Executive producer: Margie Natividad
- Camera setup: Multiple-camera setup
- Running time: 60 minutes

Original release
- Network: ABS-CBN
- Release: July 5, 2008 – October 24, 2009

Wonder Mom was a Philippine informative show which aired every Saturday morning on ABS-CBN. It was intended to help mothers be productive and self-reliant to their families. Hosted by Karen Davila, It aired from July 5, 2008, to October 24, 2009, replacing Star Magic Presents and was replaced by Kulilits.

== Host ==
- Karen Davila

== See also ==
- List of programs broadcast by ABS-CBN
