= Biyaheng Bulilit =

Biyaheng Bulilit is a travel magazine show. It features tourists spots in the Philippines from the perspectives of two Japanese nationals Ya Chang and Tatay Nishii and an inquisitive Filipino child, Chacha Cañete, who is eager to learn about her motherland.

It is a four (4) consecutive year Anak TV Seal Awardee (2011, 2012, 2013, 2014)

The show aired on TV5 from 2009 to 2010 and on Studio 23 from May 2010 to January 2014. Biyaheng Bulilit is now in its 8th season and airs internationally on The Filipino Channel.

== Hosts ==
- Chacha Cañete
- Ya Chang
- Tatay Nishii

== See also ==
- List of programs aired by TV5 (Philippine TV network)
- List of programs aired by Studio 23
