= Cha-Cha Cañete =

Filipina actress and singer

- Born: Thrisha Luise Cañete; October 6, 2004 (age 21); Manila, Philippines
- Other names: Chacha, Bulilit
- Occupations: Singer; actress
- Years active: 2008–present
- Agent: Star Magic (2009–2014)

Thrisha Luise Cañete (born October 6, 2004), commonly known as Cha-Cha Cañete or Bulilit, is a Filipino actress and singer. She was first discovered by talent manager Erik Matti upon noticing her inside a coffee shop at the ABS-CBN compound when she was four years old, and started out as a commercial model for the real estate company Camella Homes, with a song "Bulilit Sanay Sa Masikip".

She appears regularly on the reruns of the children's sketch comedy show Goin' Bulilit.

She performed Girl on Fire by Alicia Keys in Tawag ng Tanghalan: Celebrity Champions on October 19, 2019.

In 2023, she graduated from senior high school at the University of Santo Tomas.

== Filmography ==
=== Film ===
| Year | Title | Role |
|---|---|---|
| 2009 | A Journey Home | Daughter |
| 2009 | Wapakman | Neighbor's Child |
| 2009 | In My Life | Kat Kat Salvacion Granddaughter |
| 2014 | Sa Ngalan ng Ama, Ina, at mga Anak | Young Indah |
| 2024 | Spy × Family Code: White | Becky Blackbell (Voice) |

=== Television ===
| Year | Title | Role |
|---|---|---|
| 2008 | Five and a Half | Host |
| 2009–10 | Kulilits | Host |
| 2009–14 | Goin' Bulilit | Herself / Various |
| 2010–14 | Biyaheng Bulilit | Host |
| 2011 | Goin' Bulilit Presents: Dance Upon A Time | Mariebeth |
| 2014 | Showtime Holy Week Special | Young Haydee Mañosca |
| 2014 | Just 4 Kids | Host |
| 2015 | Maalaala Mo Kaya: Watawat | Young Mimi |
| 2015 | Maynila | Various |
| 2016 | Dear Uge | Various |
| 2017 | Tadhana | Various |
| 2018 | Stories From The Soul | Various |
| 2018 | It's Showtime: Tawag ng Tanghalan Segment | Contestant |
| 2020 | Magpakailanman | Various |
| 2021 | Eat Bulaga! | Guest (Bawal Judgmental! Segment) |
| 2025 | Rainbow Rumble | Contestant |

=== Music ===
| Year | Title/Award | Description |
|---|---|---|
| Nov. 2014 | 2nd Place: EUROPOP at Berlin, Germany for Age 10-13 | 18 contestants from various European countries; Songs Performed: Impossible Dream as World Hit and Wish as Original Song from her album Bulilit Rockstar |
| July 2013 | 2 Silver Medals: World Championship of Performing Arts (WCOPA) at Hollywood, U.S.A. for Age Category 7–13 years old | Songs Performed: Climb Every Mountain, It's the Climb and Wish |
| May 2012 | First Album: Bulilit Rockstar | Exclusively distributed worldwide by Star Records; 9 original Filipino songs with bonus tracks including a minus 1 for all her songs and Johnsons and Johnsons Playdays jingle; Carrier single "Bakit o Bakit"; List of songs: Bakit o Bakit, Sometimes the Sun Shines Blue, Bulilit ... Handa Awit, Japan, Japan!, Best Friend, Cool School, Sports, Let's Dance and Wish |
| March 2012 | Music Video for "Bakit o Bakit" (Carrier Single) | First shown in March 2012 Goin Bulilit show; Featuring the popular band Tanya Markova |

== Accolades ==
=== Awards and nominations ===
| Year | Description |
|---|---|
| 2008 | 22nd PMPC Star Awards for TV Nominated Best Children Show Host (Five and a Half; Studio 23) |
| 2009 onwards | TV Commercials: Camella, Plemex, Bear Brand, Hunts Tomato Sauce |
| 2009 onwards | TV Guestings (local): Showtime, Minute to Win It, Kiddie Kwela, Wowowee, ASAP, Eat Bulaga, Rated K, Failon Ngayon, Matanglawin, Sweet Life among others |
| 2012 onwards | Radio Guestings (local): Brgy. LS, Pinas FM, Magic among others |
| 2009 onwards | Endorser: Moose Girl, Mario D' Boro and Robinsons Supermarket Wellness Campaign |
| 2009 onwards | Sponsors: Converse, Barbie Bags and Secosana, Faces and Curves, ZEN |
| 2010 | Anak TV Seal Awardee for Biyaheng Bulilit; 24th PMPC Star Award for TV Nominated Best Children Show Host, Kulilits, ABS-CBN |
| 2010 onwards | Actively helping LRM Foundation in their various social programs in Luzon |
| 2010 onwards | Participation in government campaign programs promoting children's rights (Agencies: Council for the Welfare of Children, Department of Social Welfare and Development, Department of Labor and Employment and Department of Agriculture; Campaigns: Ad Campaign for the Creation of Barangay Council for Children, Poster on Travel Clearance for Children, Ad Campaign promoting white corn as alternative snacks for kids) |
| 2014 | 28th PMPC Star Awards for TV Nominated Best Children Show Host (Just for Kids; GMA News TV) |
