= Dos por Dos =

Philippine national radio program

- Genre: News, General commentary
- Running time: 30 minutes (morning, 2001–06); 1 hour (morning, 2006–11, afternoon, 2006–20, 2020–22 (Wednesdays); morning extension, 2007–13); 90 minutes (2020–22) (except Wednesdays); 1 hour (2021–22); 2 hours (2022–present), all times PST
- Country of origin: Philippines
- Languages: Tagalog; English
- Home station: DZMM (2001–20); DZRH (2020–present)
- Hosted by: Anthony Taberna; Gerry Baja
- Announcer: Peter Musñgi (2001–20); Dennis Antenor, Jr. (2020–23); Yuel Reyes (2023–present)
- Created by: Angelo Palmones
- Recording studio: ABS-CBN Broadcasting Center, Quezon City (2001–20); Design Center of the Philippines, CCP Complex, Pasay (2020–21); MBC Building, CCP Complex, Pasay (2021–present)
- Original release: March 12, 2001 – present
- Opening theme: "Dos por Dos" theme "Power and Glory" by Warren Bennett

Dos por Dos (transl: Two by two) is a Philippine radio broadcast by DZMM, DZMM TeleRadyo, TeleRadyo, DZRH, DZRH News Television and DZRH TV. Hosted by Anthony Taberna and Gerry Baja, it aired on DZMM from March 12, 2001 to May 5, 2020, and DZMM TeleRadyo (later TeleRadyo) from April 12, 2007 to July 31, 2020. The show moved to DZRH and DZRH News Television (later DZRH TV) since August 31, 2020.

== History ==
=== 2000–2020: DZMM ===
Dos por Dos was the brainchild of then-DZMM manager Angelo Palmones. The program name was derived from the Filipino slang term for the length and width of a wooden jack. Network promotional material touted its hard-hitting commentary format as being likened to the strength of the jack's striking when it is being utilized for construction.

Prior to getting the job of the show's program hosts, Taberna and Baja were concurrently serving as DZMM Radyo Patrol field reporters and already paired as co-anchors for the station's weekend current affairs show Ito ang Radyo Patrol which they handled from 1999 to 2002 and the weekday early-morning newscast Gising Pilipinas from 2001 to 2007.

The program premiered on March 12, 2001, as a half-hour commentary program at the 7:30 am slot. Initially, the hosts tried to emulate the formal, high-brow and seriously-toned commentary programs of the time before retooling to exchanges of wacky banter interspersed between interview segments and field reports. This proved to be successful. The program expanded to an hour in 2006. Upon the launch of DZMM TeleRadyo in 2007, the show was expanded to the late afternoon slot as a lead-in to the radio station's simulcast of TV Patrol, a position it held until 2020.

On January 10, 2011, due to programming changes, most notably with Noli de Castro's Kabayan moving to the 6:00 am slot, the morning edition of Dos por Dos was moved to 5:00 am, concentrating more on early-morning field reports. With Gerry Baja's addition as co-host of the ABS-CBN morning show Umagang Kay Ganda in January 2012, the program was retooled again with its first fifteen minutes acting as a news rundown on simulcast with ANC, DZMM TeleRadyo and DZMM-AM alongside Umagang Kay Ganda. This lasted until March 1, 2013, when Taberna decided to concentrate on television duties, leaving Baja as solo host of a new program titled Garantisadong Balita, which replaced the morning edition.

On May 5, 2020, Dos por Dos aired its final broadcast on DZMM-AM as a part of breaking news coverage surrounding the issuance of a cease and desist order from the NTC against ABS-CBN's terrestrial broadcast assets as its legislative franchise expired the day before, with Taberna, Baja, and Alvin Elchico anchoring the proceedings. It resumed on May 8 through cable on the provisionally-rebranded TeleRadyo, with occasional pre-emptions on days when the House of Representatives scheduled hearings concerning the ABS-CBN legislative franchise.

However, as a result of retrenchments following the House committee vote denying the network a fresh legislative broadcast franchise, the show ended on July 31, 2020, with both Taberna and Baja's contracts terminated on the same date. Its vacated timeslot was absorbed by its former lead-in Pasada sa TeleRadyo effective August 3, 2020.

=== 2020–present: DZRH ===
In the interim, numerous unconfirmed reports concerning the show's future circulated. Among those were reported talks between the hosts and Radyo5 92.3 News FM, and Super Radyo DZBB, while others postulated a possible split with Baja eyeing to move to DWIZ.

However, reported talks with DZRH to accommodate the two were first disclosed through The Philippine Star entertainment columnist Ricky Lo. The move became confirmed and official on August 20, 2020, with the two hosts signing the contract within the Manila Broadcasting Company's premises. DZRH anchor Deo Macalma further disclosed that the two hosts were greenlit by Ging Reyes to continue using the trademark name as it was not put up for patenting and registering by ABS-CBN. The transfer would also reunite the two hosts with the show's original creator Angelo Palmones.

Dos por Dos resumed as a 90-minute show on August 31, 2020, through DZRH at 5:00 pm. Its format remained the same while adding a half-hour news rundown as a lead-off segment.

In July 2021, the show, together with MBC, unveiled its advocacy One Person, One Account: #AccountKoTo, with an objective of upholding wholesome discussions through "one social media account per person", and protection against Internet trolls.

In late July 2022, it was announced that the show would be transferring to the 6:00 am timeslot effective August 1; it aired on the afternoon timeslot for the last time on July 29. Following the program's move and return to the morning slot is that both Taberna and Baja also anchor DZRH's morning news programs ACS Balita from 6:00 to 6:30 am and Pangunahing Balita from 7:00 to 7:30 am, with the commentary and interview segments airing in between.

== Hosts ==
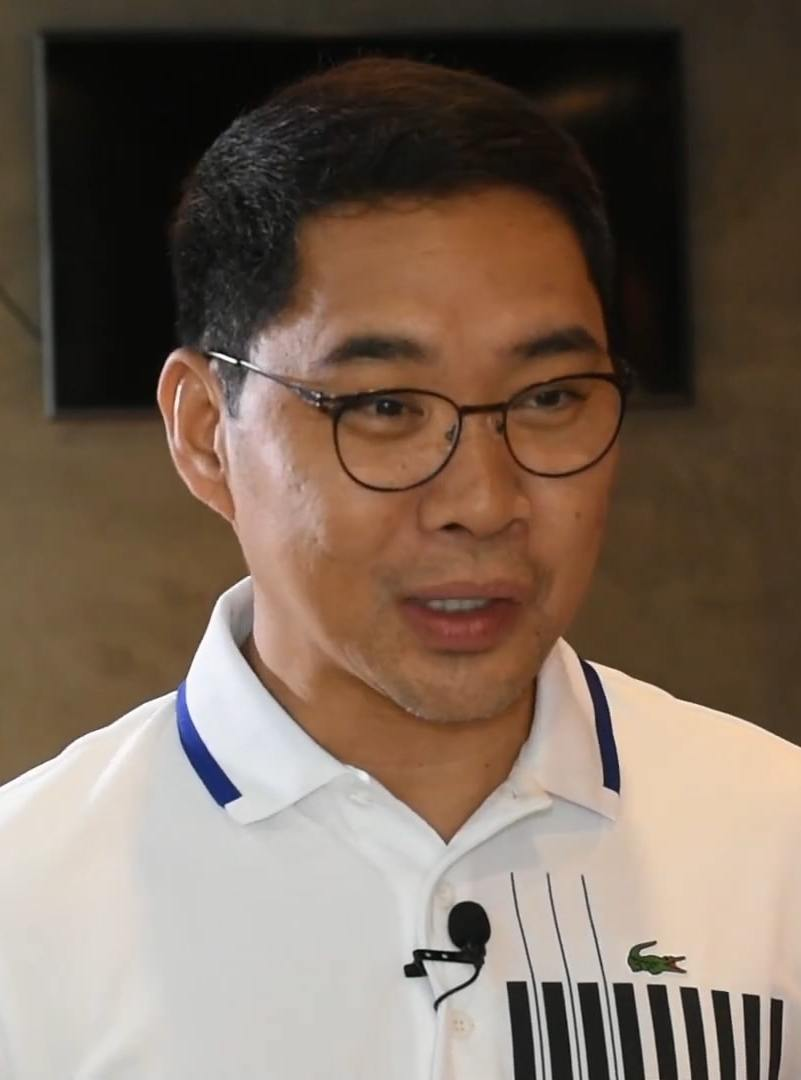
Anthony Taberna serves as the anchor.

- Anthony Taberna (since 2001)
- Gerry Baja (since 2001)
