= The Score (Philippine TV program) =

- Title card from October 1, 2018 to July 22, 2020
- Genre: Sports news, talk
- Directed by: Rommel Pedrealba
- Presented by: Mico Halili
- Country of origin: Philippines

Production
- Executive producer: Roy Briones
- Production locations: ANC Studio 8, Rockwell Center, Makati City; Studio 7, ABS-CBN Broadcasting Center, Diliman, Quezon City
- Camera setup: Multiple-camera setup
- Running time: 30 minutes
- Production companies: ABS-CBN News and Current Affairs; ABS-CBN Sports

Original release
- Network: S+A (2014–20); Liga (2020)
- Release: January 20, 2014 – July 22, 2020

The Score was a Philippine television sports news broadcasting show broadcast by S+A. Originally hosted by TJ Manotoc, it aired from January 20, 2014, to July 22, 2020. Mico Halili serve as the final host. The show airs every Sundays, Mondays, Tuesdays, Thursdays and Fridays at 6:00 PM (PST).

== History ==
Title card logo used from January 20, 2014. to September 28, 2018.

After 4 years of broadcasting in standard-definition television (480i, 4:3 SDTV) format, The Score has switched to high-definition television (1080i, 16:9 HDTV) format starting on April 2, 2018.

On May 5, 2020, the show moved to Liga due to the shutdown of ABS-CBN broadcasting, included S+A, a free TV channel because of the cease and desist order of the National Telecommunications Commission (NTC), following the expiration of the network's 25-year franchise granted in 1995.

The show ended on July 22, 2020.

== Hosts ==
The program's final host was Mico Halili, who debuted in 2018. Its former hosts are TJ Manotoc (2014–18), who was reassigned to be the ABS-CBN News correspondent for North America (last March 2019, Manotoc was promoted to ABS-CBN Bureau Chief for North America), and Anton Roxas (2018). Later, Halili became a new Cignal TV's Creative Director for sports programmes on October 28, 2020.

Gretchen Ho served as a segment host. Later, Ho moved to TV5/One News to host Gretchen Ho Reports and Morning Matters.

== See also ==
- List of programs broadcast by ABS-CBN Sports and Action
