= 2014 in Philippine television =

The following is a list of events affecting Philippine television in 2014. Events listed include television show debuts, finales, cancellations, and channel launches, closures and rebrandings, as well as information about controversies and carriage disputes.

== Events ==
=== January ===
- January 17 – After 17 years of broadcast, Studio 23 ended its commercial operations on Thursday evening.
- January 18 – ABS-CBN's new UHF sports channel on Channel 23, S+A, was officially launched and lasted until the shutdown of ABS-CBN broadcasting on May 5, 2020 which replaced Studio 23 that was closed on a day prior to S+A's launch.
- January 20 – Emil Paden from Caloocan City was proclaimed as Eat Bulaga!'s That's My Tambay grand winner.
- January 22 – Vhong Navarro was beaten by Cedric Lee and five other men in a condominium unit after he was allegedly caught in the act of raping Deniece Cornejo, the occupant of the said condominium unit. Navarro aired his side on the said incident in an interview by Boy Abunda for his program, Buzz ng Bayan, on January 26. Last April 26, Lee together with his companion Simeon Raz was arrested by the NBI agents in Oras, Eastern Samar, 1 week after the Taguig RTC issued warrants of arrests for the serious illegal detention case. On May 5, Cornejo surrendered to the authorities at the Philippine National Police headquarters in Camp Crame.

=== February ===
- February 7
  - People's Television Network, in partnership with HBKOR, Inc., announced that it will launch a talent search called K-Pop Idol Search (KIS) – Pinoy Edition. Preliminaries were held April to August 2014. The winner of the said competition will win two million pesos, a six-month intensive training in South Korea, and a five-year exclusive performing contract.
  - 14 people died, including 2 foreigners and comedian Tado Jimenez, after a Florida bus with 45 passengers on-board fell into a 500-meter deep ravine in Bontoc, Mountain Province. 24 others were reported injured, while four more passengers were reported missing.
- February 8 – Wally Bayola made a tearful return as one of the hosts of Eat Bulaga! after a 5-month hiatus due to a sex video scandal.
- February 10 – Tibay Family was hailed as Eat Bulaga!'s Pamilyang Pinoy Henyo Nationwide Grand Champion.
- February 14
  - The revived local version of MTV in the country, MTV Pinoy was relaunched. Sam Pinto, Andre Paras, singer Josh Padilla, and Yassi Pressman were also introduced as the channel's VJs.
  - Manila Clasico Game 7 PBA semi-finals match between Barangay Ginebra San Miguel and San Mig Super Coffee Mixers garnered the top spot as the most-watched primetime television program in Metro Manila by AGB Nielsen Philippines with a record-breaking 32% audience share in MEGATAM.
- February 20 – The 10th USTv Students' Choice Awards. ABS-CBN, and its programs and media personalities received 16 awards; GMA Network, including its free news television channel GMA News TV, received 9 awards; while TV5 received 1 award.
- February 22 – Guilherme "Gui" Adorno of Portugal was hailed as You're My Foreignoy 2014 Grand Winner on Eat Bulaga!.
- February 24 – Bandila, a late night news program broadcast by ABS-CBN, reported that two persons from Pangasinan were reported to have a flesh-eating disease and their disease is highly communicable. By February 25, the Department of Health (DOH) confirmed that the mysterious flesh-eating disease affecting two persons in the province of Pangasinan was a hoax. DOH also clarified that the two individuals were in fact affected by leprosy, and a severe case of psoriasis. The news created fear among the public. It also became a hot topic online as the mysterious disease was said to be part of a prophecy by a self-titled Indian prophet Vincent Selvakumar of the Voice of Jesus Ministries who visited the country last April 2013. Julius Babao, one of the anchors of the news program, later clarified on February 25 that it was not their intention to ignite fear among the public. He further added, It is not the program's intention to scare the public but to report the information we gathered so that authorities would give appropriate action. On February 27, ABS-CBN issued an official statement that was broadcast on the same program apologizing for the fear and panic caused by the report that was broadcast on February 24. The network also added that their internal ombudsman office will look into the false report, and will take appropriate actions based on the findings of the network's ombudsman. On February 28, the provincial government of Pangasinan demanded for an apology from ABS-CBN. The provincial government said that the false news report had greatly damaged the province's tourism sector.
- February 26 – ABS-CBN was the most awarded television network after receiving nine awards in the 49th Anvil Awards by the Public Relations Society of the Philippines (PRSP). GMA Network's Dapat Tama electoral advocacy campaign also received an award in the said event.

=== March ===
- March 5 – The National University Bulldogs clinched their back-to-back championship title in after defeating the Ateneo de Manila University Blue Eagles in game 2 of UAAP Season 76 Men's Volleyball Finals held at the Smart Araneta Coliseum in Quezon City.
- March 7 – GMA Network and ABS-CBN earned 11 and 5 nominations respectively in the 2014 New York Festivals International Television and Film Awards. The awards ceremony was held last April 8 (April 9; Philippine time) in Las Vegas, Nevada, United States.
- March 8 – Tearful Vhong Navarro returned to It's Showtime for more than a month of hiatus after recovering from injuries sustained following a mauling incident by six men in a condominium unit at The Fort, Taguig on January 22.
- March 15 – The Ateneo de Manila University Lady Eagles clinched their first-ever championship title in history after defeating the De La Salle University Green Archers in winner-take-all game 4 of the UAAP Season 76 Women's Volleyball Finals held at the SM Mall of Asia Arena in Bay City, Pasay.
- March 19 – TV5 news anchor Erwin Tulfo and GMA Super Radyo DZBB 594 commentator Carmelo del Prado Magdurulan were named by the Philippine Daily Inquirer as among the beneficiaries of the diversion of congressional allocations from the Priority Development Assistance Fund (PDAF) which was coursed through the National Agribusiness Corporation (Nabcor) in 2009. Both media men were reported to have received P245,535. Due to this, TV5 and GMA Network separately announced that they will be probing their respective broadcasters involved in the said allegations.
- March 21 – GMA Network dominated the 5th Golden Screen Awards organized by the Entertainment Press Society as it bags the Outstanding TV Network award together with 27 other awards. ABS-CBN got home 24 awards while TV5 bagged away 2 awards.
- March 22
  - A. Montes I Elementary School from Iloilo City emerged as Eat Bulaga's Junior Pinoy Henyo Sayawan Grand Champion held at the Newport Performing Arts Theater, Resorts World Manila. They were coached by Yuri Villanueva.
  - Haydee Mañosca emerged as Stars on 45 champion on It's Showtime.
- March 23 – GMA Network launched their own version of the Hollywood Walk of Fame called the "GMA Walk of Fame". Over 196 personalities and talents of the Kapuso Network both from the Entertainment and News and Public Affairs divisions had their own star at the Walk of Fame located at the network's compound in EDSA, Quezon City.
- March 29 – Kapatid TV5 International renewed their contract with OSN, a pay TV network based in the Middle East and North Africa. Kapatid TV5 was named as the second top-rated Filipino international channel by OSN.
- March 30 – ABS-CBN formally launched this year's Station ID for the summer season called "Masayang Muli ang Kwento ng Summer" featuring the travel destinations, the culture and the smile of every Filipino. Kathryn Bernardo and Daniel Padilla rendered the song "PINASmile" which has been used for the station ID.
- March 31 – ZOE Broadcasting Network's channel, Light TV, was rebranded as Light Network after 3 years.

=== April ===
- April 5 – Kapt. Jose Cardones Memorial Elementary School from Taguig City emerged as Eat Bulaga's Junior Pinoy Henyo Pautakan grand champion.
- April 7 – Discovery Channel's Manhunt series, starring ex-US Navy SEAL Joel Lambert, will feature the forest of Subic Bay Freeport Zone, Olongapo City. Lambert will try to trek around the Subic tropical forest while evading capture by the 1st Scout Ranger Regiment.
- April 9
  - GMA Network's daily docu-reality program Tunay na Buhay episode entitled Sanggol at Langaw won the gold medal at the 2014 New York Festivals International TV and Film Awards. Six other GMA programs and plugs, and two ABS-CBN programs bagged the silver and bronze medals, respectively.
  - Filipina models Katarina Rodriguez and Jodilly Pendre were named as the second and first runner-up of the Asia's Next Top Model (season 2) finale which was aired on Star World. Malaysian aspirant Sheena Liam was hailed as the winner of the said reality modelling competition. The show was also aired on TV5 in a delayed telecast.
- April 23 – Department of Social Welfare and Development Secretary Dinky Soliman accused News5, TV5's news division, of manipulating information of their unkempt DSWD warehouse (currently used for the World Food Programme) with rotten and spoiled relief goods in Brgy. Calibaan, Tacloban City. The report was aired last March 26 on Pilipinas News, the network's late night newscast. In an official statement, TV5 stands for its story on the incident.
- April 26 – Bryan Castillo was named as the grand winner of the reality show The Biggest Loser Pinoy Edition: Doubles aired on ABS-CBN. Bryan, known as the Pride of Pembo, Makati and the member of Team MagKapatid now weighs in at 139 pounds from the former 293 pounds with a weight loss percentage of 52.56%. Kayen Lazaro, Francis Asis and Osie Nebreja were named as the 1st, 2nd and 3rd runner up, respectively.
- April 29 – ABS-CBN (both for television and radio, and the Manila and Regional Network Group stations) won major awards at the 22nd KBP Golden Dove Awards with 22 awards including Best TV station and the KBP Lifetime Achievement Award given to the network's chairman, Eugenio Lopez III. TV5 only got 2 awards for Pinoy Explorer (Best TV Magazine Program) and Ogie Alcasid of Tropa Mo Ko Unli (Best Comedy Actor). Pampanga-based TV network CLTV-36 was awarded for the second time as the Best Provincial TV station.

=== May ===
- May 5
  - Documentarist Howie Severino named as the Vice President for Professional Development of GMA News after he resigning as the VP for Multimedia Journalism of GMA Network and the editor-in-chief of GMA News Online. Severino will keep his job as the host of I-Witness and anchor of News to Go.
  - GMA Network chairman and CEO Felipe L. Gozon confirms the network stockholders is in negotiations with San Miguel Corporation chairman Ramon Ang who is interested to buy the equity stake of the network.
- May 8–10 – Advertising and Marketing companies joined together for the staging of the first AD Summit Pilipinas 2014 with the theme, entitled Age of Enlightenment, and the Kidlat Awards that will recognized the achievements of advertising industry in 2013. The convention was held at the Subic Bay Exhibition and Convention Center in Subic, Zambales. TV5, RMN, MBC and ABS-CBN are the major sponsors of the said event to be organized by Accredited Advertising Agencies of the Philippines and Advertising Suppliers Association of the Philippines.
- May 10 – Baguio-based John Raspado, formerly one of the wildcard contestants of the contest was hailed as the grand winner of I Am Pogay segment of the noontime show It's Showtime aired on ABS-CBN, the contest on TV for gay men.
- May 18 – News personalities Mike Enriquez, Luchi Cruz-Valdes, and Korina Sanchez both denied their links in to the Pork Barrel scam controversy of Janet Lim Napoles.
- May 19 – GMA News's special coverage (consisting of 24 Oras, State of the Nation with Jessica Soho, Saksi, 24 Oras Weekend and Kapuso Mo, Jessica Soho) of the aftermath of Typhoon Yolanda that hit several parts of the Visayas region last November 2013 to be awarded as one of the 46 winners of the George's Foster Peabody Awards to be held in New York City. This is the fourth time that a Philippine TV network was recognized by the Peabody Awards. I-Witness documentaries Kidneys for Sale (2000), Kamao (2000) and Ambulansya de Paa (2009), Brigada Siete feature on Child Labor (2000) and Reel Time's Salat (2013) were former recipients of the award.
- May 22 – GMA Network won the Outstanding TV Station of the year of the 34th Rotary Club of Manila Journalism Awards.
- May 30 – ABS-CBN (Gold Services Company of the Year Award) and its president and CEO Charo Santos-Concio (Woman of the Year for the Philippines) emerged as the lone Philippine winner of the Asia-Pacific Stevie Awards held at South Korea.

=== June ===
- June 1 – The premiere telecast of It Takes Gutz to be A Gutierrez, the first reality TV show based on one of the prominent showbiz families in the country, the Gutierrezes, aired on E! Channel Asia. In the pilot episode of the Mike Carandang-directed program, Richard Gutierrez confirms that his partner Sarah Lahbati gave birth to a baby boy named Zion.
- June 2
  - Asian Television Content Corporation (ATC) started their blocktime agreement for Intercontinental Broadcasting Corporation (IBC Channel 13), fifth time for the network (with former blocktime deals from Vintage, Viva, Makisig (discontinued and not aired) and AKTV). ATC will supply quality alternative programming for the government-sequestred TV network.
  - In line with their 40th anniversary in the television industry, People's Television Network Channel 4's newscasts (Balitaan, PTV NewsBreak, News @ 1, News @ 6, NewsLife and The Weekend News) will be reformatted with new titlecards, new graphic designs and a brand new studio set design by Extremity Arts.
- June 4 – For the fourth straight time, GMA Network's First Vice President for News Programs and State of the Nation anchor Jessica Soho was recognized as the Most Trusted News Presenter in the Philippines by Reader's Digest Asia.
- June 11 – The Movie and Television Review and Classification Board ordered ABS-CBN to attend a mandatory conference on the gender sensitivity issues for their reality show Pinoy Big Brother: All In. The Philippine Commission on Women condemned the June 4 episode on the nude painting task given for 4 housemates of the program, Jayme Jalandoni, Ranty Portento, Daniel Matsunaga and Michele Gumabao. Jayme, Ranty and Michele was part of the evictees from the reality show.
- June 13 – ABS-CBN won the Award of Excellence at recent IABC's International Gold Quill Awards 2014 for their advocacy of the restoration of Philippine classic films. The awards were held in Toronto, Ontario, Canada.
- June 14
  - Veteran actress Boots Anson-Roa tied the knot once again, now together with his new fiancé, attorney King Rodrigo in a wedding ceremony led by Cardinal-Archbishop Luis Antonio Tagle at the Archbishop's Palace in Manila.
  - Nhikzy Vheench Calma (Mini Michael Jackson) emerged as MiniMe Grand Winner.
- June 16 – Brigada's Gintong Burak episode won the One World Award, the highest recognition of the USIFVF for the Philippine television. That said episode, together with Wagas, both from GMA News TV, was awarded the Gold Camera Award in the 2014 US International Film & Video Festival, GMA News and Public Affairs, likewise won five silver screen awards and one certificate of excellence awards. ABS-CBN also got 2 awards.
- June 18 – StarStruck batch 5 alumnus Steven Silva and Save Me Hollywood vocalist/I Am Meg Season 1 winner Julz Savard will become the cast members of The Boston, the second season of The Kitchen Musical. Some of the scenes of the drama will be shot in Manila. The show will be aired on Lifestyle and will be also aired internationally.
- June 22 – MTRCB praised Fox International Channels, the cable TV channels group and distributor of the hit American TV series The Walking Dead on their self-regulation by airing warnings during the show. MTRCB chairman Toto Villareal, together with the board members and FIC VP Jude Turcuato attended the meeting at the FIC headquarters in Taguig City.
- June 24 – GMA Network, through a group of stockholders, the Duavit, Jimenez and the Gozon families have decided to sell their minority equity interest in the company's outstanding capital stock to San Miguel Corporation president Ramon S. Ang.
- June 25–26 – UNTV 37 celebrated its first decade on the air. The TV station pioneered free public service programs to the public and the use of its rescue team and UV drones is backed by Daniel Razon, popularly known as Kuya Daniel or as Mr. Public Service.
- June 25 – TV5 presents to the advertisers their newest programming line-up for the 3rd quarter in 2014 during the Signal No. 5: Umuulan ng Saya trade launch at the Manila Polo Club.
- June 26 – Mayor Herbert Bautista, Architect Bong Recio, PBC Pres. Atom Henares and UNTV-BMPI CEO Daniel Razon led groundbreaking of the soon-to-rise 18-storey UNTV Broadcast Center located a few meters away from the current UNTV building in EDSA Philam Homes, Quezon City. The building will be completed in January 2016.

=== July ===
- July 1 – Veteran journalist Jessica Soho has retired from her post as the first vice president for news programs for GMA News. Soho will keep her job as the host of Kapuso Mo, Jessica Soho and anchor of State of the Nation with Jessica Soho.
- July 9 – Game 5 of the 2014 PBA Governor's Cup Finals between Grand slam champions San Mig Coffee Mixers and Rain or Shine Elasto Painters gained an average of 4 million viewers or 9.5 percent AMR and 34 percent audience share in the National Urban TV Audience Measurement (NUTAM) in the primetime slot, based on Nielsen Media Research.
- July 12 – Christian Broadcasting Network Asia and ABS-CBN signed a contract to air the bible-based animated series Superbook on the Yes Weekend! morning line-up. Christian Broadcasting Network Asia President Peter Kairuz and ABS-CBN Head of TV Production Cory Vidanes graced the contract signing.
- July 14 – The Boycott Sofitel and "No to Sofitel" campaign was launched by the supporters of UNTV and Daniel Razon due to intentional delisting of the channel in their hotel cable line-up, among other reasons.
- July 19 – Ilocana beauty Chatterlie Mae Umalos was crowned the first ever grand finals winner of Gandang Babae 2014 during a live episode of It's Showtime.
- July 27
  - Team Sarah Lyca Gairanod won the first season of The Voice Kids after their successful finale at the Resorts World Manila.
  - TV5 news anchor Paolo Bediones was the latest victim of a sex video scandal with an unknown woman spreading thru social media and became a trending topic on Twitter.
- July 28 – PTV 4 and IBC 13 employees staged their protest at the Commonwealth Avenue in time for the PNoy's State of the Nation Address.
- July 30 – Eat Bulaga!, the Philippines longest running noontime show, celebrated its 35th year on Philippine Television.

=== August ===
- August 9 – Celebrity couple Dingdong Dantes and Marian Rivera was engaged after their marriage proposal during the live telecast birthday special of Marian aired on GMA Network. Their wedding will be set on December 30, 2014, in the Immaculate Conception Cathedral in Cubao, Quezon City.
- August 23 – 9TV is the network was launched.
- August 24 – Brazilian-Japanese model and actor Daniel Matsunaga was chosen by the voting public to become the Big Winner of Pinoy Big Brother: All In in the Big Night held at the Resorts World Manila and aired on ABS-CBN. Matsunaga won P1M cash and other prizes including Asian Trip for 2 and a condo unit. Maris Racal, Jane Oineza and Vickie Rushton were named as the 2nd, 3rd and 4th placers respectively.
- August 29
  - ABS-CBN bagged another Stevie award for Company of the Year – Media & Entertainment, the third Stevie award bagged by ABS-CBN for 2014.
  - Sharon Cuneta ends her 2-year contract with TV5. Her last program with the network was Madam Chairman which ended last January.
- August 30 – Ricardo Marcial emerged as Stars on 45 Volume 2 champion on It's Showtime.

=== September ===
- September 1 – Jack City was no longer aired on BEAM Channel 31 as BEAM prepares for the ISDB-T digital television. However, Jack City continues to broadcast on cable networks. After its closure, it aired O Shopping and TBN which its started from 9:00 am of the date mentioned above.
- September 3 – Sec. Sonny Coloma in the hearing for the 2015 PCOO Senate budget and GCG Adisclosed that efforts to privatize IBC-13 will continue next year despite legal obstacles. Escudero suggest to Congress to allocate subsidy for unpaid GSIS, SSS, PhilHealth contributions of the network employees.
- September 7
  - Billy Crawford was arrested after his drunk behavior at the Taguig Police Station 7, happened hours after the Star Magic Ball when Crawford was the guest. Billy was apologized to the police and the fans. The following day, Crawford post bail on his Malicious Mischief case.
- September 25 – Richard Yap and Jodi Sta. Maria officially announced in their press conference that ABS-CBN's morning drama Be Careful with My Heart will officially end on November 28 after their successful 2-year run.

=== October ===
- October 1 – TV Patrol Weekend's coverage on the onslaught of Typhoon Yolanda was recognized as the nominee for the News category of the 2014 International Emmy Awards.
- October 4
  - Liana Ella Kuzma hailed as FHHM 2014 Grand Winner on Eat Bulaga.
  - The National University Lady Bulldogs clinched their first-ever women's basketball championship title in history after defeating the Far Eastern University Lady Tamaraws in game 2 of the UAAP Season 77 Women's Basketball Finals held at the SM Mall of Asia Arena in Bay City, Pasay. This was also their perfect 16-0 record, just like FEU did a perfect record in 2012.
- October 12 – Valerie Weigmann was declared the winner of Miss World Philippines 2014, crowned by outgoing titleholder and current Miss World, Megan Young at the Mall of Asia Arena. She will be competing on December 14 in London for the Miss World 2014 crown.
- October 14 – ABS-CBN scored yet another Stevie award for People's Choice Stevie Award for Media & Entertainment, the fourth Stevie award bagged by ABS-CBN in 2014.
- October 15 – The National University Bulldogs clinched the UAAP Season 77 men's basketball title after defeating the Far Eastern University Tamaraws 2–1 in winner take-all game 3 of the best-of-three finals series held at the Smart Araneta Coliseum in Quezon City. This was their second basketball championship title since they last won after 60 years.
- October 18 – Nikko Seagal Natividad was crowned the first ever grand finals winner of Gandang Lalake: Kuma-Career during a live episode of It's Showtime.
- October 23 – The Fastbreak 2014 was held at the SM Mall of Asia Arena.
- October 25 – Team Jugs, Teddy and Billy hailed as the fifth anniversary champion on It's Showtime.

=== November ===
- November 10 – As part of GMA News shakeup, Vicky Morales joined the 24 Oras team as its third anchor, as rejoins are Mel Tiangco and Mike Enriquez. Also, GMA Regional newscasts for Bicol, Cebu, Davao, Cagayan de Oro, Iloilo, Dagupan and Ilocos adopted the 24 Oras branding. Along with Saksi (which Pia Arcangel replaced Morales on her stint), as rejoins Arnold Clavio and Balitanghali (which Connie Sison replaces Arcangel on her stint), as rejoins Raffy Tima, the graphic package went flat, also their title cards, the return of the Myriad font for 24 Oras, and the OBB, along with its energetic theme music.
- November 13 – ABS-CBN launches the Christmas song Thank You, Ang Babait Ninyo, after the news program TV Patrol.
- November 19 – Mang Obet won ₱1,000,000, making a total of ₱1,040,000 on It's Showtime's Isang Tanong, Isang Milyon.
- November 20
  - More than 200 talents of GMA Network, members of the Talents Association of GMA filed a complaint against the network following the network's stand for refusal for them to become regular employees even the Project Employment Contract with benefits deal will present to them.
  - Jobelle won ₱1,000,000, making a total of ₱1,022,000 on It's Showtime's Isang Tanong, Isang Milyon.
- November 23 – ABS-CBN dominated 32 categories, including Best TV Station, in the recently concluded 28th PMPC Star Awards for TV 2014 held at the Solaire Resort and Casino.
- November 27 – The Fastbreak 2014 Closing Ceremony was held at the Philippine Arena.

=== December ===
- December 9 – Joel won ₱1,000,000, making a total of ₱1,022,000 on It's Showtime's Isang Tanong, Isang Milyon.
- December 13 – Neil Never Exit in Life was hailed as the Ultimate Talentado in Talentadong Pinoy 2014, the Mighty Revolution of which were held at Newport Performing Arts Theater, Resorts World Manila.
- December 20 – Albay's Majestic Tala Parol from Oas, Albay emerged as TV Parol Grand Winner on It's Showtime.
- December 30 – Kapuso power couple Marian Rivera and Dingdong Dantes are now married in a wedding ceremony at the Immaculate Conception Cathedral in Cubao, Quezon City. President Benigno Aquino III, Ogie Alcasid, German Moreno, Vic Sotto and GMA Network CEO chairman Felipe L. Gozon also attended the wedding.

== Debuts ==
=== Major networks ===
==== ABS-CBN ====
The following are programs that debuted on ABS-CBN:

- January 5: Home Sweetie Home
- January 27: The Legal Wife
- February 3: The Biggest Loser Pinoy Edition: Doubles
- February 10: Aquino & Abunda Tonight
- February 24: Digimon Xros Wars, Metal Fight Beyblade: Baku, and Skip Beat!
- March 10: Ikaw Lamang
- March 17: Dyesebel
- March 21: Red Alert
- March 24: Mirabella
- March 30: Voltron Force and Wolverine (Anime version)
- March 31: Moon of Desire
- April 27: Pinoy Big Brother: All In
- April 28: Pinoy Big Brother: All In Über
- May 18: The Buzz 15
- May 24: The Voice Kids season 1
- May 26: The Heirs
- June 7: Ipaglaban Mo!
- June 16: Sana Bukas Pa ang Kahapon
- June 28: I-Shine Talent Camp (season 3) and T.U.F.F. Puppy (season 1)
- June 30: Kuroko's Basketball season 2 and Naruto: Shippuden season 6
- July 7: Pure Love
- July 12: Superbook Classic and Superbook Reimagined (season 1)
- July 21: Hawak Kamay
- July 27: Max Steel
- August 9: Mga Kwento ni Marc Logan
- August 18: Ana Manuela and Pretty Man
- August 25: Miss Ripley
- August 30: I Do
- September 15: Mukha
- September 16: The Singing Bee (season 6)
- September 22: Bet on Your Baby (season 2)
- September 29: Angel Eyes
- October 11: Superbook Reimagined (season 2)
- October 13: Two Wives
- October 26: The Voice of the Philippines season 2
- October 27: Forevermore
- November 17: Bagito
- November 24: Dream Dad
- December 1: Give Love on Christmas
  - December 1: The Gift Giver
  - December 22: The Gift of Life
- December 7: My Giant Friend
- December 8: Faith
- December 13: Maayong Buntag Mindanao – Sabado (ABS-CBN Davao)

==== Re-runs ====
- January 4: Sine'skwela
- March 10: Mr. Bean: The Animated Series^{2} and Yu-Gi-Oh! 5D's season 1
- March 17: My Girlfriend Is a Gumiho
- March 31: Meteor Garden (2001)^{5}^{6} and Mr. Bean^{2}^{3}^{4}
- April 14: Kapamilya Kiddie Blockbusters
- April 17: Animazing Tales
- May 12: Meteor Garden II
- June 30: Lovers in Paris (2004)
- July 14: My Girl (2005)
- August 9: Math-Tinik
- September 16: Precious Hearts Romances Presents: Midnight Phantom
- October 13: Komiks Presents: Da Adventures of Pedro Penduko, Marcelino Pan y Vino and Princess Sarah (1985)
- November 8: The Adventures of Jimmy Neutron, Boy Genius^{1}^{2}
- November 17: The Adventures of Tom Sawyer
- December 15: Santa's Apprentice
- Notes
1. ^ ^{a} Originally aired on TV5
2. ^ ^{b} Originally aired on Studio 23 (now S+A)
3. ^ ^{c} Originally aired on PTV
4. ^ ^{d} Originally aired on ABC (now TV5)
5. ^ ^{e} Originally aired on GMA
6. ^ ^{f} Originally aired on Q (now GMA News TV)

==== GMA ====
The following are programs that debuted on GMA Network:

- January 6: The Medyo Late Night Show with Jojo A.
- January 20: Tale of Arang: A Love Without End and The Borrowed Wife
- January 27: Carmela: Ang Pinakamagandang Babae sa Mundong Ibabaw, Paraiso Ko'y Ikaw, and Rhodora X
- February 17: Innamorata
- March 10: Kambal Sirena and One Piece season 9
- March 17: Detective Conan season 7 and GMA SineBabad
- March 23: Asian Horror Stories
- April 21: Mischievous Kiss: Love in Tokyo and My Love from the Star
- April 26: Hayate the Combat Butler!!
- May 12: Basta Every Day Happy
- May 18: Sine De Kalibre
- May 19: The Master's Sun
- May 26: Niño and Return of the Wife
- May 27: Lucky Me Nam Nam Dear Bossing and Serial Killer Earth
- May 28: Human Planet
- May 31: Tales of Horror
- June 2: Ang Dalawang Mrs. Real and Fairy Tail season 2
- June 9: The Half Sisters
- June 21: Marian
- June 22: Ismol Family
- June 23: Dading
- June 25: Mankind: The Story of All of Us
- June 30: My BFF and My Destiny
- July 5: Monsuno
- July 13: Superhero Sunday
- July 14: Secret Love
- July 18: Isyu ug Istorya (GMA Davao)
- July 21: The Tim Yap Show (season 4)
- August 11: I Hear Your Voice
- August 18: Bleach season 5
- August 24: Sa Puso ni Dok
- September 1: Hunter × Hunter (2011; season 1) and May Queen
- September 14: MP Featuring Sport Science
- September 15: Strawberry Lane
- September 17: Planet Earth
- September 22: Don't Lose the Money and Hiram na Alaala
- October 5: Bet ng Bayan and Ready, Set, Laban! (season 2)
- October 6: Ang Lihim ni Annasandra
- October 6: Seasons of Love
  - October 6: My Soulmate, My Soulhate
  - October 13: I Do, I Don't
  - October 20: First Dance, First Love
  - October 27: BF for Life, GF for Life
- October 10: Elemento
- October 13: Yagit (2014)
- October 14: The Blue Planet
- October 20: Empress Ki and Ilustrado
- October 25: Kamen Rider OOO
- November 10: 24 Oras Regional (as part of 24 Oras reformatting)
  - 24 Oras Ilokano (GMA Ilocos)
  - 24 Oras North Central Luzon (GMA Dagupan)
  - 24 Oras Bikol (GMA Bicol)
  - 24 Oras Central Visayas (GMA Cebu)
  - 24 Oras Western Visayas (GMA Iloilo)
  - 24 Oras Southern Mindanao (GMA Davao)
  - 24 Oras Northern Mindanao (GMA Cagayan de Oro)
- November 17: More Than Words
- December 1: GMA Christmas Cartoon Festival Presents
- December 3: Frozen Planet
- December 15: Prime Minister and I

==== Re-runs ====
- March 24: Fairy Tail season 1
- May 26: Jewel in the Palace^{3}
- August 18: Ghost Fighter^{4}, Jackie Chan Adventures^{1}^{2} and Slam Dunk^{5}
- September 15: Full House (2004)
- November 3: Coffee Prince (2007)
- November 10: Bantatay
- Notes
1. ^ ^{a} Originally aired on ABS-CBN
2. ^ ^{b} Originally aired on Jack TV
3. ^ ^{c} Originally aired on Q (now GMA News TV)
4. ^ ^{d} Originally aired on IBC
5. ^ ^{e} Originally aired on ABC (now TV5)

==== TV5 ====
The following are programs that debuted on TV5:

- January 16: Asia's Next Top Model cycle 2
- January 23: Obsession
- February: Movie Max 5
- February 8: Kaya and Magic? Gimik! Revealed
- February 13: Bigtime
- February 17: Kwentong Gilas: The Road to Spain
- February 22: Yaman ng Bayan
- March 3: Confessions of a Torpe
- March 8: Spinnation (season 2)
- March 22: Celebrity Dance Battle
- March 31: Beki Boxer
- May 3: Ben 10: Omniverse and One of the Boys
- May 4: Dave the Barbarian, Emperor's New School, Gravity Falls, Stitch! and The Replacements
- May 5: Aksyon Dabaw (TV5 Davao) and Good Morning Ser
- May 19: Si Goot da Wanderpol (TV5 Cebu)
- June 1: Jasmine
- June 22: Shop Japan: Oaklawn Home Shopping and Wow Mali: Lakas ng Tama!
- June 28: Tropa Mo Ko Nice Di Ba?!
- July 5: It Takes Gutz to be a Gutierrez
- July 7: Bride of the Century and Cool Guys, Hot Ramen, Face the People (season 3) and Let's Ask Pilipinas (season 3)
- July 21: Aksyon sa Tanghali, Aksyon sa Umaga, Aksyon Tonite, Lloyd in Space and T3: Enforced
- August 10: Quiet Please!: Bawal ang Maingay
- August 16: Talentadong Pinoy 2014
- September 13: Trenderas
- September 15: Demolition Job (season 3)
- September 17: History with Lourd (season 2)
- September 18: Unang Tikim
- September 22: Wattpad Presents
  - September 22: My Tag Boyfriend
  - September 29: Mr. Popular meets Ms. Nobody Book 1
  - October 6: Poser
  - October 13: Almost a Cinderella Story
  - October 20: DyepNi
  - October 27: Savage Casanova
  - November 3: Fake Fiance
  - November 10: Diary ng Hindi Malandi (Slight Lang!)
  - November 24: Mr. Popular meets Ms. Nobody Book 2: Still in Love
  - December 1: His Secretary
  - December 8: Just For a While
  - December 15: Game of Love
- September 22: Juan Direction Islanders
- September 27: Guardian Blade and Si Gud, Si Bad and si Agley (TV5 Cebu)
- October 6: The Amazing Race Philippines (season 2)
- November 15: The Legend of Tarzan
- November 21: Bitag: Special Investigation
- November 24: Hulk and the Agents of S.M.A.S.H.
- December 1: Infinity Nado
- December 15: Henry Hugglemonster and Sofia the First

==== Re-runs ====
- June 9: Star Confessions
- July 21: Handy Manny and Mickey Mouse Clubhouse
- October 6: Avengers Assemble^{2} and X-Men: The Animated Series^{1}^{3}^{4}^{5}
- December 8: Confessions of a Torpe
- December 27: Everybody Hapi and Iskul Bukol (2011)
- Notes
1. ^ ^{a} Originally aired on ABS-CBN
2. ^ ^{b} Originally aired on S+A
3. ^ ^{c} Originally aired on Jack TV
4. ^ ^{d} Originally aired on Studio 23 (now S+A)
5. ^ ^{e} Originally aired on ABC (now TV5)

=== State-owned networks ===
==== PTV ====
The following are programs that debuted on People's Television Network:

- January 4: Be Alive
- February 15: The Doctor Is In: Kalusugan Pangkahalatan
- February 23: Xperience Pinoy Sports TV
- March 10: Kahanga-hangang Pilipinas
- May 8: Business Examiner and Personage
- May 9: Real Lives, Real People with Jo Salcedo
- May 10: Lingkod Bayan ni Tony Falcon
- June 7: News @ 6 Saturday Edition
- June 17: Upload
- June 29: CHInoyTV
- July 14: Say Mo, Sec? A 10-part pre-SONA special
- August 10: MTRCB Uncut
- October 6: Noli Me Tangere and RadyoBisyon
- November 3: Here Comes Mr. Oh
- November 14: C-CAAP Kalusugan at Kalikasan
- December 9: Shakey's Girls Volleyball League Season 12 NCR Leg

==== Unknown dates ====
- JMM Covers
- Panalangin
- PTV-KBS Documentaries

=== IBC ===
The following are programs that debuted on IBC:

- January 18: Sabong TV: Ang #1 Sabong Show ng Bayan and Thunderbird Sabong Nation
- June 2: Animalia, Gadgets & Gizmos,RioMania: Football Fanatics and Stoplight TV
- June 7: Amazing World of Automobiles, Beyond Stardom, Boost, Cultural Flavours and The Big Planet
- June 8: A to Z of Motorsport, Cinema Nouveau, Culture Flavours, Fame and Fashion Memoir
- July 14: Home Shopping Network and Say Mo, Sec? A 10-part pre-SONA special
- August 3: Shalom
- October 6: RadyoBisyon
- October 27: IBC NewsBreak (2nd incarnation)
- November 16: Kawaii International
- December 9: Music and the Spoken Word Christmas

==== Re-runs ====
- May 12: Travel and Trade
- June 2: Hi-5^{1}, The Two Sides of Ana (Ang Dalawang Mukha ni Ana)^{3} and Retro TV
- June 7: La Teniente^{2}
- November 15: ONE FC

===== Unknown =====
- Travel: Philippines
- Notes
1. ^ ^{a} Originally aired on TV5
2. ^ ^{b} Originally aired on Fox Filipino
3. ^ ^{c} Originally aired on Telenovela Channel

=== Minor networks ===
The following are programs that debuted on minor networks:

- January 18: Friends Again on Light TV (now Light Network)
- February 3: Class7 Civil Servant on Net 25
- February 11: UNTV Cup (season 2) on UNTV
- March 19: Frontliners on UNTV
- March 24: Agila Probinsiya, Klima ng Pagbabago and Talking Heads on Net 25
- March 27: Patakaran on Net 25
- March 28: Diskusyon on Net 25
- March 31: VeggieTales on Light Network
- April 7: Liwanagin Natin on Net 25
- April 11: My OFW Story on UNTV
- April 14: The Break Room on Net 25
- May 10: Star Mill: CLTV 36's Star Search (season 2) on CLTV 36
- June 6: City of San Fernando, Pampanga presents Win Win for All on CLTV 36
- June 7: Ignite Gospel Music Festival (season 2) on Light Network
- June 15: Sessions on 25th Street (season 4) on Net 25
- June 15: Klasrum: Ibang Klase To! (season 3) on UNTV
- June 21: E.T.C. News on CLTV 36
- July 7: Da Vinci Learning: Marvi Hammer, Da Vinci Learning: Right on Top, Da Vinci Learning: Science Please and Da Vinci Learning: Spellz: World Ahoy on Net 25
- July 12: Da Vinci Learning: Sci Q on Net 25
- July 30: Ignite Fired-Up on Light Network
- August 21: UNTV Cup Off-Season: Clash of the Three on UNTV
- September 15: SP'ng SP talaga! Serbisyong Publiko Serbisyong May Puso on CLTV 36
- September 15: Flower I Am on Net 25
- September 22: Tinig ng Pasko on CLTV 36
- September 23: Tatak Central Luzon on CLTV 36
- September 27: Digital Photographer on Net 25
- October 3: Your Govt@Work in CL on CLTV 36
- October 4: Barangay Basketball 3x3 and Negosyo, Asenso, Atbp. on Net 25
- October 5: His Life TV on CLTV 36
- October 5: Tribe on Net 25
- October 6: Asean in Focus on Net 25
- October 25: Fitness Center on Net 25
- October 26: Hit List, Powershift and RoadShow on Net 25
- November 17: UNTV Cup (season 3) on UNTV
- December 6: Tiny Kitchen on Light Network
- November 24: Morning Chikahan on CLTV 36
- December 12: Bagong Pampanga on CLTV 36

==== Unknown dates ====
- Arangkada Balita on CLTV 36
- Pahappahooey Island on Light Network
- Tinig ng Marino on UNTV

==== Re-runs ====
- January 20: The Snow Queen on Net 25

=== Other channels ===
The following are programs that debuted on other channels:

- January 2: The Finder on Fox Channel Philippines
- January 6: Sakto on DZMM TeleRadyo
- January 6: Lost season 6 on Fox Channel Philippines
- January 6: NCIS season 9 on Jack City
- January 6: Bob's Burgers season 4 on Jack TV
- January 8: Asia's Next Top Model cycle 2 on Star World
- January 10: Almost Human on Fox Channel Philippines
- January 10: American Dad! season 10 on Jack TV
- January 13: Dollhouse season 2 and The Office season 5 on Fox Channel Philippines
- January 16: American Idol season 13 on ETC
- January 18: Marvel Knights, Pinoy Pride Fight Review and Silver Surfer on S+A
- January 19: ABS-CBN Sports presents Top Rank Boxing, Avengers Assemble, NBA Action, SEA Games Myanmar 2013 Sinag Pilipinas and UEFA Champions League on S+A
- January 20: Merlin season 4 on Jack TV
- January 20: Dora the Explorer, Driven to Extremes, Fast Break, Go, Diego, Go!, Lunch Blockbusters, News plus, Supa Strikas, Team Umizoomi (seasons 1 to 3), The Score, and UFC Unleashed on S+A
- January 20: Jeopardy! and Wheel of Fortune on TGC
- January 21: Action Movie Zone and CSI: Crime Scene Investigation season 12 on S+A
- January 22: GT Academy and The Ultimate Fighter on S+A
- January 23: WWE Tough Enough on S+A
- January 24: FPJ: Kampeon ng Aksyon on S+A
- January 25: Boarding Pass on GMA News TV
- January 25: Pundasyon on INC TV
- January 25: Football Asia and J.League Highlights on S+A
- January 27: Joey (season 1) on Fox Channel Philippines
- February 1: Weddings TV on GMA News TV
- February 1: Brooklyn Nine-Nine on Jack TV
- February 2: The Following season 2 on Jack City
- February 2: Total Blackout on TGC
- February 6: Sons of Anarchy season 5 on Jack City
- February 7: Psych season 6 and House season 7 on Jack City
- February 8: Generation RX Plus and Kaya Mo Bang!: The Fudgee Barr Adventures on S+A
- February 10: Project Runway season 11 on ETC
- February 10: Freedom Riders Asia and Little Battlers eXperience on S+A
- February 11: Home Shopping Network on Solar News Channel
- February 14: MTV Halo-Halo on MTV Pinoy
- February 15: Kitchen Stories on GMA News TV
- February 15: Alphas (season 2) on Jack TV
- February 15: MTV Top 20 International and ShoutOut on MTV Pinoy
- February 15: AFC Champions League Highlights, Asenso Pinoy, Family Rosary Crusade, Sabong TV and Sagupaan TV on S+A
- February 16: MTV Top 20 Pilipinas on MTV Pinoy
- February 16: Agribusiness: How It Works, Asian Tour Highlights, The Healing Eucharist, The Word Exposed and UFC Ultimate Insider on S+A
- February 17: The OPM Show on MTV Pinoy
- February 18: The Tonight Show Starring Jimmy Fallon on My Movie Channel
- February 18: Karera Pilipinas on SLBN
- February 18: The Office season 6 on Fox Channel Philippines
- February 21: Star-Crossed on ETC
- February 21: Law & Order: Special Victims Unit season 12 on Jack City
- February 24: Juan Direction on AksyonTV
- February 24: The Amazing Race 24 on AXN Asia
- February 24: Road to Rio on Balls and S+A
- February 25: The Voice season 6 on AXN Asia
- February 27: Survivor: Cagayan on Jack TV
- February 28: Joey (season 2) on Fox Channel Philippines
- March 6: Chicago Fire season 2 and Those Who Kill on Jack City
- March 7: The League (season 3) on TGC
- March 9: Trending Now with Kelly Misa on ANC
- March 10: Bachelor Pad (season 2) on ETC
- March 13: The Amazing Food Challenge: Fun in the Philippines on Asian Food Channel
- March 16: The Americans season 2 on Jack City
- March 16: Euro Tour Highlights, Friends Again and UEFA Europa Magazine Show on S+A
- March 17: The Mentalist season 4 on Jack City
- March 17: Afternoon Movie Zone and Zero Hour on S+A
- March 19: Covert Affairs (season 4) and Motive on Jack City
- March 19: Rasing Hope season 4 on Jack TV
- March 20: NCIS: Los Angeles season 4 on S+A
- March 21: Friday's Action Pack on S+A
- March 23: Business Flight on GMA News TV
- March 23: The 100 (season 1) on Jack TV
- March 23: Agri TV: Hayop sa Galing on S+A
- March 24: The Office season 7 on Fox Channel Philippines
- March 26: Ready for Love on ETC
- March 26: Kitchen Millionaire on TGC
- April 2: Friends with Better Lives on ETC
- April 3: Mukha on ANC
- April 3: Fat March on TGC
- April 5: Kiko Rustia Presents Dis is Pinas on GMA News TV
- April 5: Saturday Night Live season 39 on Jack TV
- April 8: Ironside on Jack City
- April 8: Ramon Bautista's Science of Stupid on Nat Geo
- April 10: Chicago P.D. season 1 on Jack City
- April 12: Fringe season 5 on Jack City
- April 12: J.League Highlights on S+A
- April 14: WWE Raw on Fox Channel Philippines
- April 14: The Power of Destiny on Telenovela Channel
- April 25: The Office season 8 on Fox Channel Philippines
- April 26: Undercover Boss Canada (season 1) on Solar News Channel
- April 27: Building Bryks, Donut Showdown, Knife Fight and Restaurant Takeover on 2nd Avenue
- April 27: Sports Unlimited on S+A
- April 27: Top Gear season 16 on Solar News Channel
- April 28: Thomas & Friends (seasons 12 to 16) on S+A
- April 29: Back in the Game on 2nd Avenue
- April 29: Spider-Man Unlimited on S+A
- April 30: Parenthood season 5 on 2nd Avenue
- May 1: Witches of East End season 1 on 2nd Avenue
- May 1: Blood Lad on Hero
- May 2: The Mindy Project (season 2) and Web Therapy season 2 on 2nd Avenue
- May 3: Rexona Do The Moves on Myx
- May 3: Liquid TV / Watersports on Pinoy Extreme
- May 3: The Score: Filoil Flying V Hanes Pre-Season Premier Cup Recap on S+A
- May 4: The Middle season 5 on 2nd Avenue
- May 4: Young Minds Inspired on GMA News TV
- May 5: Good Morning Ser on AksyonTV
- May 6: 24: Live Another Day on Jack City
- May 7: Game Changers and Ice Cold Cash on TGC
- May 9: Bakuman on TeleAsia Filipino
- May 10: MS Motosuit Motocross TV on CCTN 47
- May 11: The Sexy Chef on Colours
- May 11: Great Migrations on GMA News TV
- May 12: The One Who Couldn't Love on Telenovela Channel
- May 13: America's Got Talent season 8 on TGC
- May 13: Royal Pains (season 5) on Jack City
- May 14: Gintama': Enchōsen on Hero
- May 17: Being Human season 4 on Jack TV
- May 18: Nang Magising Si Juan on GMA News TV
- May 19: Salem season 1 on Jack TV
- May 22: Sirens (season 1) on Jack TV
- May 23: Mongolian Bar-B-Q on GNN
- May 24: GameDay Weekend on Balls and S+A
- May 24: About a Boy (season 1) on Jack TV
- May 25: Just 4 Kids on GMA News TV
- May 26: The Fashion Fund on ETC
- May 27: Camp on ETC
- May 27: TKO: Tanghali Knockouts on GMA News TV
- May 29: Nikita season 4 on ETC
- May 29: The Office season 9 on Fox Channel Philippines
- May 29: Gang Related on Jack City
- May 30: Reign season 1 and The Millionaire Matchmaker (season 5) on ETC
- June 1: It Takes Gutz to be a Gutierrez on E!
- June 2: Balitang Global – Middle East-Europe Edition on ANC
- June 2: Serbisyo All Access on Solar News Channel
- June 5: A Day in the Life (season 2) and Best Ink (season 2) on Jack TV
- June 9: Bubble Guppies (seasons 1 and 2) and Spider-Man and His Amazing Friends on S+A
- June 11: Pretty Little Liars season 5 on ETC
- June 11: Ground Floor (season 1) and Undateable (season 1) on Jack TV
- June 13: Touchline: 2014 FIFA World Cup Highlights on Balls and S+A
- June 13: Suits season 4 on Jack TV
- June 15: Team U on S+A
- June 16: Team U on Balls
- June 16: Once Upon a Time season 1 on S+A
- June 21: Rubi on a Roadtrip on ANC
- June 23: Merlin season 5 on Jack TV
- June 24: Winners & Losers season 1 on 2nd Avenue
- June 28: Fun with Philip on GMA News TV
- July 2: The Boston: The Kitchen Musical on Lifestyle
- July 4: Reckless on Jack City
- July 6: Life of Riley on 2nd Avenue
- July 6: Tyrant on Jack City
- July 7: Project Runway All Stars season 2 on ETC
- July 7: UGBP on Pinoy Xtreme
- July 7: Don't Mess with an Angel on Telenovela Channel
- July 8: The Rachel Zoe Project (season 5) on ETC
- July 8: Hard Hat TV on Pinoy Xtreme
- July 9: Beyond the Sea on Pinoy Xtreme
- July 10: Witches of East End season 2 on 2nd Avenue
- July 10: In Game on Pinoy Xtreme
- July 11: Square Off: V&A The Firm Debates (season 9) on ANC
- July 12: Growing Up Fisher and Sean Saves the World on 2nd Avenue
- July 12: Surviving Jack on Jack TV
- July 14: Aksyon Solusyon and Remoto Control on AksyonTV
- July 15: Battleground, Legit (season 2), Louie season 3, Parks and Recreation season 6 and Wilfred season 4 on Jack TV
- July 17: Dukes of Melrose on ETC
- July 18: Dallas (season 3) on Jack City
- July 19: Modern Living TV on ANC
- July 19: The Strain on Jack City
- July 19: Kaya Mo Bang?: The Fudgee Barr Adventures (season 2) on S+A
- July 20: Ancient Aliens on GMA News TV
- July 21: Aksyon sa Umaga and Aksyon Tonite on AksyonTV
- July 21: Cebuano News, Daybreak, Headlines, Network News, Newsday, Nightly News on Solar News Channel
- July 27: Etcetera (season 5) on ETC
- August 2: Fastbreak on DZMM TeleRadyo
- August 2: Reel Action Sabado on GMA News TV
- August 2: 14th CESAFI men's basketball tournament on S+A Cebu
- August 3: Top Gear season 17 on Solar News Channel
- August 4: Kapampangan News on Solar News Channel
- August 5: City Girl Diaries on ETC
- August 6: Chef Roblé & Co. (season 2) on 2nd Avenue
- August 10: Brickleberry (season 2) and Futurama (seasons 9 and 10) on Jack TV
- August 13: Bantay at Kasangga ng OFW on SLBN
- August 14: 2014 J.League Division 1 on S+A
- August 17: Now Eat This! with Rocco DiSpirito on 2nd Avenue
- August 17: Doowee Donut Hooper and Drumline Competition on S+A
- August 18: Bates Motel season 2 and The Mentalist season 5 on Jack City
- August 19: Rush on Jack City
- August 21: America's Next Top Model cycle 21 and Built on ETC
- August 21: The Biggest Loser US season 11: Couples 4 on TGC
- August 23: Beware the Batman and Care Bears: Welcome to Care-a-Lot on 9TV
- August 24: Small Acts, Big Stories, Strawberry Shortcake's Berry Bitty Adventures and Young Justice on 9TV
- August 24: Comics on Cam on Hero
- August 24: Legends on Jack City
- August 25: Top Chef Masters season 5 on 2nd Avenue
- August 30: Boys Ride Out and Something to Chew On (season 2) on 9TV
- August 30: Pinoy N' Focus on S+A
- August 31: Eat, Drink, Love on 2nd Avenue
- August 31: Trippers on ANC
- September 1: O Shopping on BEAM TV
- September 2: Ang Tugon, Great Day to Live, Praise The Lord, The 700 Club International and The 700 Club Asia on BEAM TV
- September 5: The League (season 4) on TGC
- September 6: Myx Olympics (season 2) on Myx
- September 9: The Ellen DeGeneres Show season 12 on 2nd Avenue
- September 12: Stylized on ETC
- September 12: Best Ink (season 3) on Jack TV
- September 13: Defiance season 2 on Jack TV
- September 15: How I Met Your Mother season 1 on Fox Channel Philippines
- September 15: Kdabra (season 1) on Fox Filipino
- September 17: MTV VJ Hunt 2014 on MTV Pinoy
- September 18: American Dream Builders on 2nd Avenue
- September 18: New Girl season 4 on ETC
- September 20: My Hero Nation (season 5) on Hero
- September 22: Smash: Covers Project on 2nd Avenue
- September 22: House season 4 and The Mentalist season 1 on Fox TV Philippines
- September 22: Myx Movie Date on Myx
- September 23: The Voice season 7 on AXN Asia
- September 23: White Collar (season 4) on Fox TV Philippines
- September 23: Forever on Jack City
- September 24: The Mysteries of Laura on 2nd Avenue
- September 24: Person of Interest season 4 on Jack City
- September 24: The Chair U.S. on TGC
- September 25: Kdabra (season 2) on Fox Filipino
- September 25: Survivor: San Juan del Sur on Jack TV
- September 25: Without a Trace season 4 on Fox TV Philippines
- September 27: Modern Family season 6 on 2nd Avenue
- September 27: The Amazing Race 25 on AXN Asia
- September 27: Cold Case season 3 on Fox TV Philippines
- September 28: Drive and Top Gear season 18 on 9TV
- September 30: Galing Pook (season 2) on ANC
- September 30: The Big Bang Theory season 8 on Jack TV
- September 30: Sports Valley Jai-Alai on Pinoy Xtreme
- October: Mission: Immigration on GNN
- October 1: Fate/kaleid liner Prisma Illya on Hero
- October 1: Voltron: Defender of the Universe on S+A
- October 1: Chinatown TV, EGames and STV: Ang Sabong Show ng Bayan on SLBN
- October 2: Stalker on ETC
- October 2: Splash U.S. on TGC
- October 3: DSWD TV on CCTN
- October 3: The Vampire Diaries season 6 on ETC
- October 3: Bones season 9 on Jack City
- October 4: Pinay Beauty Queen Academy on GMA News TV
- October 5: Good Company and Two Stops Over on 9TV
- October 5: It Takes Gutz to be a Gutierrez (season 2) on E!
- October 5: Family Guy season 14 and The Simpsons season 26 on Jack TV
- October 5: Myx Ambushed (season 2) on Myx
- October 5: Xtreme Riders on Pinoy Xtreme
- October 6: A to Z on ETC
- October 7: Reign season 2 and The Originals season 2 on ETC
- October 7: 24 season 6, Buffy the Vampire Slayer season 6 and The Unit season 3 on Fox TV Philippines
- October 8: The Flash season 1 on ETC and Jack TV
- October 8: Lie to Me (season 2), Smallville season 6 and Venorica Mars season 2 on Fox Channel Philippines
- October 8: Kdabra (season 3) on Fox Filipino
- October 9: One Tree Hill season 4 and Once Upon a Time season 1 on Fox TV Philippines
- October 9: Arrow season 3 on Jack City and Jack TV
- October 10: Angel season 4, Ghost Whisperer season 2 and Numbers season 5 on Fox TV Philippines
- October 10: K-On! on TeleAsia Filipino
- October 12: Itanyag ang Pagliligtas on INCTV
- October 12: SuperSabong on MetroTurf
- October 13: Bones season 8 on Fox TV Philippines
- October 14: X Events on Pinoy Xtreme
- October 15: Interior Therapy with Jeff Lewis (season 2) on 2nd Avenue
- October 15: How I Met Your Mother season 2 on Fox Channel Philippines
- October 15: Profile on INCTV
- October 16: Deception on 2nd Avenue
- October 18: Omaga Diaz Reports and Turo-Turo on DZMM TeleRadyo
- October 18: I Am Meg (season 3) on ETC
- October 19: Playing House on 2nd Avenue
- October 19: The Bogart Case Files on 9TV
- October 19: Health Matters on ANC
- October 19: 90210 season 1 on Fox TV Philippines
- October 20: Xtyle on Pinoy Xtreme
- October 20: Taichi Chasers on S+A
- October 21: Going Straight on TGC
- October 22: Majestic Prince on Hero
- October 24: Healthline on AksyonTV
- October 24: K-On!! on TeleAsia Filipino
- October 25: Married, Suburgatory (season 3) and The Millers on 2nd Avenue
- October 25: Constantine on Jack TV
- October 26: Marco's Kitchen Burnout on 2nd Avenue
- October 26: Grimm season 4 on Jack City and Jack TV
- October 31: Two and a Half Men season 12 on Jack TV
- November 1: NBA Action on S+A
- November 3: Mistresses UK on 2nd Avenue
- November 3: Elementary (season 3) on Jack City
- November 3: American Horror Story: Freak Show on Jack TV
- November 3: Top Town on TGC
- November 4: The 100 (season 2) on Jack TV
- November 4: NBA Inside Stuff on S+A
- November 7: White Collar (season 6) on Jack City
- November 7: The Chair New Zealand on TGC
- November 8: 3rd Philippine Secondary Schools Basketball Championships Ironcon Builders Cup on AksyonTV
- November 8: Boxing Revolution on SMNI
- November 10: 2 Broke Girls season 3 on ETC
- November 10: Chozen on Jack TV
- November 14: How I Met Your Mother season 3 on Fox Channel Philippines
- November 14: The Clash: Search for the Next Great Dessert Master on Lifestyle
- November 15: Juan EU Konek on ANC
- November 16: Say Mo Doc on GMA News TV
- November 19: CNN Hollywood Express on 9TV
- November 20: Candidly Nicole and Formal Wars on ETC
- November 21: The Middle season 6 on 2nd Avenue
- November 21: The League (season 5) on TGC
- November 23: Restaurant Man on 2nd Avenue
- November 25: Hotel Babylon on 2nd Avenue
- November 25: Ouran High School Host Club on Hero
- November 26: Defense & Security TV on S+A
- November 29: I'll Still Love You 10 Years from Now on Jeepney TV
- December 1: Christmas from the Heart 2014 on SMNI
- December 6: Yumeiro Patissiere on Hero
- December 7: 40 Day-Daily Prayer of Pilgrimage to Pope Francis on 9TV
- December 8: Protect the Boss on Jeepney TV
- December 9: Captain Earth on Hero
- December 12: How I Met Your Mother season 4 on Fox Channel Philippines
- December 12: Becoming a Millionaire on TeleAsia Filipino
- December 13: Kiddopreneur on ANC
- December 13: The Dr. Tess Show on GMA News TV
- December 14: Takeshi's Medical Check-Up on Jeepney TV
- December 20: #MichaelAngelo on GMA News TV

==== Unknown dates ====
- Breaktime, Executive Session, May Trabaho!, MBC Network Center, Musika, Atbp., Piece of Air, Review, RH Balita @ 7 pm, RH Balita @ 9:30 am, RH Ratsada Balita, Sagot sa Bayan, STL: Showbiz Tsismis Live! and Sunday Love Chill on DZRH News Television

==== Re-runs ====
- January 6: Iisa Pa Lamang and Magkaribal on Jeepney TV^{1}
- January 13: Ang Tanging Ina on Jeepney TV^{1}
- January 13: White Lies on TeleAsia Filipino^{3}
- January 22: Gagambino on Fox Filipino^{2}
- January 23: John En Shirley on Jeepney TV^{1}
- January 23: Don't Cry, My Love on TeleAsia Filipino^{3}
- January 23: Top Chef Masters season 4 on TGC^{6}
- January 25: Bora: Sons of the Beach on Jeepney TV^{1}
- January 26: Power Rangers Super Samurai on Hero^{5}
- January 26: Sa Sandaling Kailangan Mo Ako on Jeepney TV^{1}
- January 26: Rockman.EXE Stream on TeleAsia Filipino^{2}
- January 27: Hitman Reborn! season 3 on Hero^{1}
- January 27: Top Chef season 9 on TGC^{6}
- January 29: Love You a Thousand Times on TeleAsia Filipino^{3}
- January 30: Naruto: Shippuden season 5 on Hero^{1}
- January 31: Gintama season 2 on Hero
- February 1: Pink Lipstick^{3} and Shaider^{1}^{2}^{9}^{10} on TeleAsia Filipino
- February 3: Super Inggo on Jeepney TV^{1}
- February 4: Richard Loves Lucy on Jeepney TV^{1}
- February 8: Digimon Tamers on Hero^{1}
- February 8: Agimat: Ang Mga Alamat ni Ramon Revilla: Tonyong Bayawak on Jeepney TV^{1}
- February 8: Queen of Reversals on TeleAsia Filipino^{3}
- February 13: Myx Halo-Halo on Myx
- February 21: Klasmeyts on Jeepney TV^{1}
- February 24: Glamorosa on Fox Filipino^{3}
- March 1: Ultraman Mebius on Hero^{1}
- March 2: Power Rangers Jungle Fury on Hero^{1}
- March 3: Ben and Kate and The New Normal on 2nd Avenue
- March 3: Gintama season 4 on Hero
- March 10: Minsan Lang Kita Iibigin on Jeepney TV^{1}
- March 16: G-mik on Jeepney TV^{1}
- March 17: Goin' Bulilit Classics on Jeepney TV^{1}
- March 18: Fushigi Yuugi on TeleAsia Filipino^{2}^{3}
- March 20: Digimon Adventure 02 on Hero^{1}
- March 20: Giant on TeleAsia Filipino^{3}
- March 21: 30 Rock (seasons 6 and 7) on Jack TV
- March 22: 666 Park Avenue on Jack TV
- March 24: Hitman Reborn! season 4 on Hero^{1}
- March 24: Marimar on Telenovela Channel^{2}^{11}
- March 25: Gokusen (season 1) on TeleAsia Filipino^{2}
- March 28: Go On and Guys with Kids on 2nd Avenue
- March 31: Asian Treasures on Fox Filipino^{2}
- March 31: Kuroko's Basketball season 1 on Hero^{1}
- March 31: Meteor Garden (2001) on Jeepney TV^{1}^{2}^{8}
- April 1: America's Next Top Model cycle 13 on Lifestyle^{5}
- April 4: Gintama season 5 on Hero
- April 6: Eyeshield 21 (season 2) on Hero^{1}
- April 6: Brand X with Russell Brand on Jack TV
- April 6: Gadget Boy on TeleAsia Filipino^{2}
- April 7: Sarap with Family on GMA News TV
- April 7: Triumph of Love on Telenovela Channel
- April 14: Project Runway All Stars season 1 on ETC
- April 17: Flames of Desire on TeleAsia Filipino^{3}
- April 20: ASAP Remix on Jeepney TV^{1}
- April 21: Imortal, May Minamahal and Pilipinas, Game Ka Na Ba? on Jeepney TV^{1}
- April 23: Gokusen (season 2) on TeleAsia Filipino^{2}
- April 23: The Catalina on ETC
- April 27: Power Rangers Operation Overdrive on Hero^{1}
- April 28: Princess Sarah (2007) on Jeepney TV^{1}
- April 29: Supa Strikas on S+A
- May 1: Wedding Band on 2nd Avenue
- May 1: Nuts Entertainment on Fox Filipino^{2}
- May 2: The Office season 8 on Jack TV
- May 4: Digimon Frontier on Hero^{1}
- May 4: The Big Bang Theory season 6 on Jack TV
- May 5: A Day in the Life (season 1) on Jack TV
- May 6: Live from Abbey Road (season 5) on Jack TV
- May 8: Mula sa Puso (1997) on Jeepney TV^{1}
- May 9: The Legend of Bruce Lee on TeleAsia Filipino^{8}
- May 10: Super Inggo 1.5: Ang Bagong Bangis on Jeepney TV^{1}
- May 10: Defiance season 1 on Jack TV
- May 11: Kuroko's Basketball (season 1) on Hero^{1}
- May 12: Meteor Garden II Uncut on Jeepney TV^{1}^{2}
- May 13: Gokusen (season 3) on TeleAsia Filipino^{2}
- May 16: Night After Night on TeleAsia Filipino^{8}
- May 19: All About Eve (2009) on Fox Filipino^{2}
- May 19: Tonight with Dick & Carmi on Jeepney TV^{1}
- May 20: Yu-Gi-Oh! 5D's season 2 on Hero
- May 21: Jigoku Shoujo on Hero
- May 26: Kambal sa Uma and Patayin sa Sindak si Barbara on Jeepney TV^{1}
- May 28: Yatterman (2008) on TeleAsia Filipino^{3}
- June 2: Alphas (season 1) on Jack TV
- June 3: Revolution season 1 on Jack TV
- June 3: George and Cecil on Jeepney TV^{1}
- June 4: Tactics on TeleAsia Filipino^{4}
- June 6: The Office season 9 on Jack TV
- June 7: Masked Rider Hibiki on TeleAsia Filipino^{3}
- June 9: Codename: Asero on Fox Filipino^{2}
- June 9: My Binondo Girl on Jeepney TV^{1}
- June 9: Likeable or Not on TeleAsia Filipino^{3}
- June 12: Digimon Xros Wars and Trigun^{2} on Hero
- June 14: Bates Motel season 1 on Jack TV
- June 15: Eyeshield 21 (season 3) on Hero ^{1}
- June 15: Metal Fight Beyblade on S+A^{1}
- June 16: The Sisters on Fox Filipino^{3}
- June 16: Kung Fu Kids on Jeepney TV^{1}
- June 18: Sakurano 3 + 1 on TeleAsia Filipino ^{2}
- June 21: Wagas on Fox Filipino^{4}
- June 21: Titser on GMA News TV
- June 21: Tarajing Potpot on Jeepney TV^{1}
- June 23: Top Chef season 10 on TGC^{6}
- June 28: Love of the Condor Heroes (2006) on TeleAsia Filipino^{2}
- June 29: Sailor Moon S on Hero
- June 29: Agimat: Ang Mga Alamat ni Ramon Revilla: Pepeng Agimat on Jeepney TV^{1}
- July 1: Gintama (season 4) on Hero
- July 1: Coffee Prince (2012)^{2}, Good Wife, Bad Wife^{3} and Knock Out^{2} on TeleAsia Filipino
- July 4: Life After Top Chef on 2nd Avenue
- July 4: It's Always Sunny in Philadelphia season 8 on Jack TV
- July 7: Captain Barbell (2006) and Joaquin Bordado on Fox Filipino ^{2}
- July 7: Maging Sino Ka Man (2006) on Jeepney TV^{1}
- July 8: Kuroko's Basketball season 2 on Hero^{1}
- July 12: Kokey at Ako on Jeepney TV^{1}
- July 13: Time Between Dog and Wolf on TeleAsia Filipino^{3}
- July 14: My Girl (2005) on Jeepney TV^{1}
- July 24: Atashin'chi (season 2) on TeleAsia Filipino^{2}
- July 25: Shin Mazinger Edition Z on TeleAsia Filipino^{2}
- July 28: Power Rangers Samurai on S+A^{5}
- August 1: 1600 Penn on 2nd Avenue
- August 1: I Dare You (season 1) on Jeepney TV^{1}
- August 2: Digimon Savers on Hero^{1}
- August 2: A Gentleman's Dignity on Jeepney TV^{1}
- August 6: Black & White^{3} and Heaven's Dragon on TeleAsia Filipino
- August 9: Ako si Kim Samsoon on TeleAsia Filipino^{2}
- August 10: Hitman Reborn! (season 4) on Hero^{1}
- August 11: Spooky Nights on GMA News TV^{2}
- August 11: Kahit Isang Saglit on Jeepney TV^{1}
- August 18: Boys Over Flowers on Jeepney TV^{1}
- August 20: Masked Rider 555 on TeleAsia Filipino^{2}
- August 24: Agimat: Ang Mga Alamat ni Ramon Revilla: Elias Paniki on Jeepney TV^{1}
- August 25: Spider-Man Unlimited on S+A
- August 28: Naruto: Shippuden season 6 on Hero^{1}
- August 28: Bakugan Battle Brawlers on TeleAsia Filipino^{2}
- August 30: Basketball Tribe on TeleAsia Filipino^{1}
- September 1: Katorse on Jeepney TV^{1}
- September 5: Goin' Bananas on Jeepney TV^{1}^{9}
- September 8: Ang TV (Year 2) on Jeepney TV^{1}
- September 9: Yakitate!! Japan on Hero
- September 10: Gintama (season 5) on Hero
- September 12: It's Always Sunny in Philadelphia season 9 on Jack TV
- September 14: Power Rangers Samurai on Hero^{7}
- September 14: Gimik on Jeepney TV^{1}
- September 15: Enchanted Garden on Fox Filipino^{3}
- September 15: Detective Loki on Hero^{3}
- September 16: Hunter × Hunter (1999) on TeleAsia Filipino^{2}
- September 17: Kung Fu Soccer on TeleAsia Filipino^{8}
- September 20: All About Eve (2009) on TeleAsia Filipino^{2}
- September 22: Hitman Reborn! (season 4) and Yu-Gi-Oh! Zexal season 1 on S+A^{1}
- September 22: Fated to Love You (Taiwanese version) on TeleAsia Filipino^{2}
- September 23: Yu-Gi-Oh! Zexal on Hero^{1}
- September 29: 100 Days to Heaven on Jeepney TV^{1}
- September 29: Heroman on S+A^{1}
- October 1: Nura: Rise of the Yokai Clan on S+A^{1}
- October 6: Agua Bendita on Jeepney TV^{1}
- October 7: Glass Castle on TeleAsia Filipino^{3}
- October 13: Death Note, Ixion Saga DT, Jigoku Shoujo and Major (season 2) on Hero
- October 15: Eyeshield 21 (season 1) on Hero^{1}
- October 20: Palibhasa Lalake and Pure Love (2011) on Jeepney TV^{1}
- October 20: Bakugan: New Vestroia on TeleAsia Filipino^{2}
- October 21: The Legend on TeleAsia Filipino^{2}
- October 25: Animazing Tales on Hero^{1}
- October 25: Cinderella Man and Queen Seon Deok on TeleAsia Filipino^{2}
- October 29: Mobile Suit Gundam AGE on Hero
- October 31: Invincible Shan Bao Mei on TeleAsia Filipino^{8}
- November 2: Power Rangers Super Samurai on Hero^{7}
- November 3: Initial D: First Stage^{2} and Naruto Shippuden season 5^{1} on Hero
- November 7: Elemento on GMA News TV^{2}
- November 10: Love or Bread^{1}, Luna Blanca^{2} and Nandito Ako^{3} on Fox Filipino
- November 10: Hitman Reborn! (seasons 1 and 2) on Hero^{1}
- November 10: Krystala on Jeepney TV^{1}
- November 17: Iisa Pa Lamang and Ikaw ay Pag-Ibig on Jeepney TV^{1}
- November 17: Baki the Grappler on TeleAsia Filipino^{2}
- November 22: Heavenly Beauty on TeleAsia Filipino
- November 29: Starlit on TeleAsia Filipino
- December 1: It Started with a Kiss (season 1) on Fox Filipino^{1}^{2}
- December 7: Animazing Tales on Hero^{1}
- December 8: Tabing Ilog on Jeepney TV^{1}
- December 8: A Woman's Word on Telenovela Channel
- December 11: Bakugan: Gundalian Invaders on TeleAsia Filipino^{2}
- December 12: Ultraman Mebius on Hero
- December 13: Mutya on Jeepney TV^{1}
- December 14: Initial D: Second Stage on Hero^{2}
- December 14: Takeshi's Medical Check-up on Jeepney TV
- December 15: Kuroko's Basketball (season 1) on Hero^{1}
- December 17: Shaman King on TeleAsia Filipino^{2}
- December 22: My Beloved on Fox Filipino^{2}
- December 22: Freestyle on TeleAsia Filipino^{2}
- December 23: Dong Yi on TeleAsia Filipino^{2}
- December 27: Eyeshield 21 (season 2) on Hero^{1}
- December 27: Helena's Promise on Jeepney TV^{1}
- Notes
1. ^ ^{a} Originally aired on ABS-CBN
2. ^ ^{b} Originally aired on GMA
3. ^ ^{c} Originally aired on TV5
4. ^ ^{d} Originally aired on GMA News TV
5. ^ ^{e} Originally aired on ETC
6. ^ ^{f} Originally aired on 2nd Avenue
7. ^ ^{g} Originally aired on Studio 23 (now S+A)
8. ^ ^{h} Originally aired on Q (now GMA News TV)
9. ^ ^{i} Originally aired on IBC
10. ^ ^{j} Originally aired on RPN (now CNN Philippines)

== Returning or renamed programs ==
=== Major networks ===
| Show | Last aired | Retitled as/Season/Notes | Channel | Return date |
|---|---|---|---|---|
| The Biggest Loser Pinoy Edition | 2011 | The Biggest Loser Pinoy Edition: Doubles | ABS-CBN | February 3 |
| Magic? Gimik! | 2013 | Magic? Gimik! Revealed | TV5 | February 8 |
| Metal Fight Beyblade | 2010 | Same (season 2: "Metal Fight Beyblade: Baku") | ABS-CBN | February 24 |
| Philippine Basketball Association | 2014 (season 39: "Philippine Cup") | Same (season 39: "Commissioner's Cup) | TV5 / AksyonTV | March 5 |
| Spinnation | 2013 | Same (season 2) | TV5 | March 8 |
| One Piece | 2013 | Same (season 9) | GMA | March 10 |
| Detective Conan | 2011 | Same (season 7) | GMA | March 17 |
| WansapanaSummer | 2013 | Same (season 2) | ABS-CBN | March 17 |
| Pinoy Big Brother | 2012 (season 4: "Unlimited") | Same (season 5: "All In") | ABS-CBN | April 27 |
| Pinoy Big Brother: Über | 2012 (season 4: "UnliDay" and "Unlinight") | Same (season 5: "All In Über") | ABS-CBN | April 29 |
| The Buzz | 2013 | The Buzz 15 | ABS-CBN | May 18 |
| Philippine Basketball Association | 2014 (season 39: "Commissioner's Cup") | Same (season 39: "Governors' Cup") | TV5 / AksyonTV | May 18 |
| Kapag nasa Katwiran, Ipaglaban Mo! | 2013 (GMA News TV) | Ipaglaban Mo! | ABS-CBN | June 7 |
| Wow Mali Pa Rin! | 2014 | Wow Mali: Lakas ng Tama! | TV5 | June 22 |
| Juan Direction | 2014 | Juan Experiment ng Juan Direction (season 3; 2-week primetime special) | TV5 | June 23 |
| I-Shine Talent Camp | 2013 | Same (season 3) | ABS-CBN | June 28 |
| Adyenda | 2014 | Ang Bagong Adyenda | GMA / GMA News TV / Light Network | June 28 |
| NCAA: Men's Senior Basketball Tournament | 2014 | Same (season 90) | TV5 / AksyonTV | June 28 |
| Tropa Mo Ko Unli | 2014 | Tropa Mo Ko Nice Di Ba?! | TV5 | June 28 |
| Kuroko's Basketball | 2013 | Same (season 2) | ABS-CBN | June 30 |
| Naruto: Shippuden | 2013 | Same (season 6) | ABS-CBN | June 30 |
| Face the People | 2014 | Same (season 3) | TV5 | July 7 |
| Let's Ask Pilipinas | 2014 | Same (season 3) | TV5 | July 7 |
| The Tim Yap Show | 2014 | Same (season 4) | GMA | July 21 |
| T3: Reload | 2014 | T3: Enforced | TV5 | July 21 |
| Talentadong Pinoy | 2013 | Talentadong Pinoy 2014 | TV5 | August 16 |
| Bleach | 2012 | Same (season 5) | GMA | August 18 |
| Demolition Job | 2014 | Same (season 3) | TV5 | September 15 |
| The Singing Bee | 2013 | Same (season 7) | ABS-CBN | September 16 |
| History with Lourd | 2014 | Same (season 3) | TV5 | September 17 |
| Bet on Your Baby | 2014 | Same (season 2) | ABS-CBN | September 22 |
| Bonakid Pre-School Ready, Set, Laban! | 2013 | Same (season 2) | GMA | October 5 |
| The Amazing Race Philippines | 2012 | Same (season 2) | TV5 | October 6 |
| Superbook Reimagined | 2014 | Same (season 2) | ABS-CBN | October 11 |
| Yagit | 1985 | Same (2014) | GMA | October 13 |
| Philippine Basketball Association | 2014 (season 39: "Governors' Cup") | Same (season 40: "Philippine Cup") | TV5 / AksyonTV | October 19 |
| The Voice of the Philippines | 2013 | Same (season 2) | ABS-CBN | October 26 |
| National Basketball Association | 2014 | Same (2014–15 season) | ABS-CBN | October 29 |
| Reaksyon | 2014 | Same | TV5 | November 3 |
| Balitang Ilokano | 2014 | 24 Oras Ilokano | GMA Ilocos | November 10 |
| Balitang Amianan | 2014 | 24 Oras North Central Luzon | GMA Dagupan | November 10 |
| Baretang Bikol | 2014 | 24 Oras Bikol | GMA Bicol | November 10 |
| Balitang Bisdak | 2014 | 24 Oras Central Visayas | GMA Cebu | November 10 |
| Ratsada | 2014 | 24 Oras Western Visayas | GMA Iloilo | November 10 |
| Testigo | 2014 | 24 Oras Southern Mindanao | GMA Davao | November 10 |
| Testigo Northern Mindanao | 2014 | 24 Oras Northern Mindanao | GMA Cagayan de Oro | November 10 |

=== State-owned networks ===
| Show | Last aired | Retitled as/Season/Notes | Channel | Return date |
|---|---|---|---|---|
| The Doctor Is In: Kalusugan Pangkahalatan | 2012 | Same | PTV | February 15 |
| ONE FC: The Series | 2013 | Same | ATC @ IBC | June 8 |
| PBA D-League | 2014 (AksyonTV; season 4: "Foundation Cup") | Same (season 5: "Aspirants' Cup") | IBC | October 27 |
| IBC NewsBreak | 1994 | Same (2nd incarnation) | IBC | October 27 |

=== Minor networks ===
| Show | Last aired | Retitled as/Season/Notes | Channel | Return date |
|---|---|---|---|---|
| UNTV Cup | 2013 | Same (season 2) | UNTV | February 11 |
| Liwanagin Natin | 2007 | Same | Net 25 | April 7 |
| StarMill | 2013 | Star Mill: Central Luzon TV 36's Star Search (season 2) | CLTV 36 | May 10 |
| Ignite Gospel Music Festival | 2013 | Same (season 2) | Light Network | June 7 |
| Sessions on 25th Street | 2013 | Same (season 4) | Net 25 | June 15 |
| Klasrum | 2013 | Klasrum: Ibang Klase To! (season 3) | UNTV | June 15 |
| MOMents | 2014 | Same (season 25) | Net 25 | June 28 |
| Tribe | 2014 | Same | Net 25 | October 5 |
| MOMents | 2014 | Same (season 26) | Net 25 | November 8 |
| UNTV Cup | 2014 | Same (season 3) | UNTV | November 17 |

=== Other channels ===
| Show | Last aired | Retitled as/Season/Notes | Channel | Return date |
|---|---|---|---|---|
| Bob's Burgers | 2013 | Same (season 4) | Jack TV | January 6 |
| NCIS | 2013 | Same (season 9) | Jack City on BEAM TV | January 6 |
| American Dad! | 2013 | Same (season 10) | Jack TV | January 10 |
| American Idol | 2013 | Same (season 13) | ETC on SBN | January 16 |
| ABS-CBN Sports presents Top Rank Boxing | 2014 (Studio 23) | Same | S+A | January 19 |
| Wheel of Fortune (US Syndicated Version) | 2013 | Same (season 30) | TGC | January 20 |
| Jeopardy! | 2013 | Same (season 29) | TGC | January 20 |
| CSI: Crime Scene Investigation | 2014 (Studio 23) | Same (season 12) | S+A | January 21 |
| The Ultimate Fighter | 2014 (Studio 23) | Same | S+A | January 22 |
| Football Asia | 2013 (Studio 23) | Same | S+A | January 25 |
| The Following | 2013 | Same (season 2) | Jack City on BEAM TV | February 2 |
| Sons of Anarchy | 2013 (Jack TV) | Same (season 5) | Jack City on BEAM TV | February 6 |
| House | 2013 (2nd Avenue) | Same (season 7) | Jack City on BEAM TV | February 7 |
| Psych | 2013 | Same (season 6) | Jack City on BEAM TV | February 7 |
| Generation RX | 2014 (Studio 23) | Generation RX Plus | S+A | February 8 |
| Project Runway | 2013 | Same (season 11) | ETC on SBN | February 10 |
| Home Shopping Network | 2011 (Solar TV) | Same | Solar News Channel (now 9TV) | February 11 |
| Family Rosary Crusade | 2014 (Studio 23) | Same | S+A | February 15 |
| Sagupaan TV | 2014 (Studio 23) | Same | S+A | February 15 |
| Asenso Pinoy | 2014 (Studio 23) | Same | S+A | February 15 |
| Alphas | 2013 | Same (season 2) | Jack TV | February 15 |
| The Word Exposed with Luis Antonio Cardinal Tagle | 2014 (Studio 23) | Same | S+A | February 16 |
| Agribusiness: How It Works | 2014 (Studio 23) | Same | S+A | February 16 |
| Law & Order: Special Victims Unit | 2012 | Same (season 12) | Jack City on BEAM TV | February 21 |
| The Amazing Race | 2013 | Same (season 24) | AXN Asia | February 24 |
| The Voice | 2013 | Same (season 6) | AXN Asia | February 25 |
| Survivor | 2013 (season 27: "Blood vs Water") | Same (season 28: "Cagayan") | Jack TV | February 27 |
| Chicago Fire | 2013 | Same (season 2) | Jack City on BEAM TV | March 6 |
| The League | 2013 | Same (season 3) | TGC | March 7 |
| Bachelor Pad | 2011 | Same (season 2) | ETC on SBN | March 10 |
| The Americans | 2013 | Same (season 2) | Jack City on BEAM TV | March 16 |
| The Mentalist | 2012 (CHASE) | Same (season 4) | Jack City on BEAM TV | March 17 |
| Raising Hope | 2013 | Same (season 4) | Jack TV | March 19 |
| Covert Affairs | 2013 | Same (season 4) | Jack City on BEAM TV | March 19 |
| NCIS: Los Angeles | 2014 (Studio 23) | Same (season 4) | S+A | March 20 |
| Shakey's V-League | 2013 (season 10: "Open Conference") | Same (season 11: "1st Conference") | GMA News TV | March 23 |
| Saturday Night Live | 2013 | Same (season 39) | Jack TV | April 5 |
| Silver Surfer | 2014 | Same | S+A | April 12 |
| J.League Highlights | 2014 | Same | S+A | April 12 |
| Filoil Flying V Hanes Premier Pre-Season Cup | 2013 (Studio 23) | Same | S+A | April 26 |
| Top Gear | 2013 | Same (season 16) | Solar News Channel (now 9TV) | April 27 |
| Top Chef | 2013 | Same (season 11) | 2nd Avenue on RJTV | April 28 |
| Parenthood | 2013 | Same (season 5) | 2nd Avenue on RJTV | April 30 |
| The Mindy Project | 2013 | Same (season 2) | 2nd Avenue on RJTV | May 2 |
| Web Therapy | 2013 | Same (season 2) | 2nd Avenue on RJTV | May 2 |
| 24 | 2014 | 24: Live Another Day | Jack City on BEAM TV | May 6 |
| Gintama | 2013 | Gintama': Enchōsen | Hero | May 14 |
| Philippine Super Liga | 2013 (season 1: "Grand Prix Conference") | Same (season 2: "All-Filipino Conference") | Solar Sports | May 16 |
| Gameday Weekend | 2014 | Same (season 2) | Balls / S+A | May 24 |
| Nikita | 2014 | Same (season 4) | ETC on SBN | May 29 |
| The Millionaire Matchmaker | 2014 | Same (season 5) | ETC on SBN | May 30 |
| A Day in the Life | 2014 | Same (season 2) | Jack TV | June 5 |
| Best Ink | 2014 | Same (season 2) | Jack TV | June 5 |
| Pretty Little Liars | 2014 | Same (season 5) | ETC on SBN | June 11 |
| Suits | 2014 | Same (season 4) | Jack TV | June 13 |
| Once Upon a Time | 2014 (Studio 23) | Same (season 2) | S+A | June 16 |
| Graceland | 2013 | Same (season 2) | Jack City on BEAM TV | June 17 |
| Merlin | 2014 | Same (season 5) | Jack TV | June 23 |
| Shakey's V-League | 2014 (season 11: "1st Conference") | Same (season 11: "Open Conference") | GMA News TV | June 29 |
| Cuidado con el ángel | 2010 (ABS-CBN) | Don't Mess with an Angel | Telenovela Channel | July 7 |
| Project Runway All Stars | 2013 | Same (season 2) | ETC on SBN | July 7 |
| The Rachel Zoe Project | 2013 | Same (season 5) | ETC on SBN | July 8 |
| Square Off: V&A The Firm Debates | 2014 | Same (season 9) | ANC | July 11 |
| UAAP: Men's Senior Basketball Tournament | 2013 (Studio 23) | Same (season 77) | Balls / Balls HD / S+A | July 12 |
| Aksyon Solusyon | 2014 | Same | AksyonTV | July 14 |
| Remoto Control | 2014 | Same | AksyonTV | July 14 |
| Parks and Recreation | 2014 | Same (season 6) | Jack TV | July 15 |
| Louie | 2014 | Same (season 3) | Jack TV | July 15 |
| Wilfred | 2013 | Same (season 4) | Jack TV | July 15 |
| Legit | 2013 | Same (season 2) | Jack TV | July 15 |
| Dallas | 2013 | Same (season 3) | Jack City on BEAM TV | July 18 |
| Solar Daybreak | 2014 | Daybreak | Solar News Channel (now 9TV) | July 21 |
| Solar Headlines | 2014 | Headlines | Solar News Channel (now 9TV) | July 21 |
| Solar Newsday | 2014 | Newsday | Solar News Channel (now 9TV) | July 21 |
| Solar News Cebuano | 2014 | Cebuano News | Solar News Channel (now 9TV) | July 21 |
| Solar Network News | 2014 | Network News | Solar News Channel (now 9TV) | July 21 |
| Solar Nightly News | 2014 | Nightly News | Solar News Channel (now 9TV) | July 21 |
| Solar Sports Desk | 2014 | Sports Desk | Solar News Channel (now 9TV) | July 21 |
| Etcetera | 2013 | Same (season 5) | ETC on SBN | July 27 |
| Sports Talk | 2014 | Fastbreak | DZMM TeleRadyo | August 2 |
| Top Gear | 2014 | Same (season 17) | Solar News Channel (now 9TV) | August 3 |
| Chef Roblé & Co. | 2012 | Same (season 2) | 2nd Avenue on RJTV | August 6 |
| Futurama | 2013 | Same (seasons 9 and 10) | Jack TV | August 10 |
| Brickleberry | 2013 | Same (season 2) | Jack TV | August 10 |
| Bates Motel | 2013 | Same (season 2) | Jack TV | August 18 |
| The Mentalist | 2014 | Same (season 5) | Jack City on BEAM TV | August 18 |
| America's Next Top Model | 2013 | Same (cycle 21) | ETC on SBN | August 21 |
| The Biggest Loser | 2014 (season 10: "Pay It Forward") | Same (season 11: "Couples 4") | TGC | August 21 |
| Top Chef Masters | 2013 | Same (season 5) | 2nd Avenue on RJTV | August 25 |
| Something to Chew On | 2014 (Solar News Channel) | Same (season 2) | 9TV | August 30 |
| The League | 2014 | Same (season 4) | TGC | September 5 |
| Myx Olympics | 2014 | Same (season 2) | Myx | September 6 |
| The Ellen DeGeneres Show | 2014 | Same (season 12) | 2nd Avenue on RJTV | September 9 |
| Best Ink | 2014 | Same (season 3) | Jack TV | September 12 |
| Defiance | 2013 | Same (season 2) | Jack TV | September 13 |
| UEFA Champions League | 2013 (Studio 23) | Same (2014–15 season) | Balls / S+A | September 17 |
| New Girl | 2014 | Same (season 4) | ETC on SBN | September 18 |
| UEFA Europa League | 2013 (Studio 23) | Same (2014–15 season) | Balls / S+A | September 19 |
| My Hero Nation | 2013 | Same (season 5) | Hero | September 20 |
| The Voice | 2014 | Same (season 7) | AXN Asia | September 23 |
| Person of Interest | 2014 | Same (season 4) | Jack City | September 24 |
| Survivor | 2014 (season 28: "Cagayan") | Same (season 29: "San Juan del Sur") | Jack TV | September 25 |
| Modern Family | 2014 | Same (season 6) | 2nd Avenue on RJTV | September 27 |
| The Amazing Race | 2014 | Same (season 25) | AXN Asia | September 27 |
| Top Gear | 2014 (Solar News Channel) | Same (season 18) | 9TV | September 28 |
| The Big Bang Theory | 2014 | Same (season 8) | Jack TV | September 30 |
| Galing Pook | 2013 | Same (season 2) | ANC | September 30 |
| The Vampire Diaries | 2014 | Same (season 6) | ETC on SBN | October 3 |
| Bones | 2014 | Same (season 10) | Jack City | October 3 |
| Shakey's V-League | 2014 (season 11: "Open Conference") | Same (season 11: "Reinforced Open Conference") | GMA News TV | October 5 |
| Family Guy | 2014 | Same (season 14) | Jack TV | October 5 |
| The Simpsons | 2014 | Same (season 26) | Jack TV | October 5 |
| It Takes Gutz to Be a Gutierrez | 2014 | Same (season 2) | E! | October 5 |
| Myx Ambushed | 2014 | Same (season 2) | Myx | October 5 |
| The Originals | 2014 | Same (season 2) | ETC on SBN | October 7 |
| Reign | 2014 | Same (season 2) | ETC on SBN | October 7 |
| Arrow | 2014 | Same (season 3) | Jack City / Jack TV | October 9 |
| Interior Therapy with Jeff Lewis | 2013 | Same (season 2) | 2nd Avenue | October 15 |
| Philippine Super Liga | 2013 (season 2: "All-Filipino Conference") | Same (season 2: "Grand Prix Conference") | Solar Sports | October 18 |
| Undercover Boss U.S. | 2013 (Solar News Channel) | Same (season 4) | 9TV | October 18 |
| I Am Meg | 2013 | Same (season 3) | ETC on SBN | October 18 |
| Philippine Collegiate Champions League | 2014 | Same | S+A | October 24 |
| Suburgatory | 2013 | Same (season 3) | 2nd Avenue on RJTV | October 25 |
| Grimm | 2014 | Same (season 4) | Jack TV / Jack City | October 26 |
| Two and a Half Men | 2014 | Same (season 12) | Jack TV | October 31 |
| NBA Action | 2014 | Same (2014–15 season) | S+A / Basketball TV / NBA Premium TV | November 1 |
| Elementary | 2014 | Same (season 3) | Jack City | November 3 |
| American Horror Story | 2014 (season 3: "Coven") | Same (season 4: "Freak Show") | Jack TV | November 3 |
| The 100 | 2014 | Same (season 2) | Jack TV | November 4 |
| White Collar | 2014 | Same (season 6) | Jack City | November 7 |
| 2 Broke Girls | 2014 | Same (season 4) | ETC on SBN | November 10 |
| The League | 2014 | Same (season 5) | TGC | November 21 |
| UAAP Women's Volleyball | 2014 | Same (season 77) | Balls / Balls HD / S+A | November 22 |
| UAAP Men's Volleyball | 2014 | Same (season 77) | S+A | November 22 |
| UAAP Men's Football | 2014 | Same (season 77) | Balls / Balls HD / S+A | December 5 |
| Trending Now | 2014 | Same (season 2) | ANC | December 7 |

== Programs transferring networks ==
=== Major networks ===
| Date | Show | No. of seasons | Moved from | Moved to |
|---|---|---|---|---|
| January 6 | The Medyo Late Night Show with Jojo A. | —N/a | TV5 | GMA |
| January 16 | Asia's Next Top Model | 2 | Studio 23 (now S+A) | TV5 |
| February 10 | Front Row | —N/a | GMA News TV | GMA |
| February 12 | Powerhouse | —N/a | GMA News TV | GMA |
| February 24 | Yu-Gi-Oh! Duel Monsters | —N/a | GMA / Q (now GMA News TV) | ABS-CBN |
| March 27 | Human Planet | —N/a | GMA News TV | GMA |
| March 31 | Meteor Garden | —N/a | GMA / Q (now GMA News TV) | ABS-CBN / Jeepney TV |
| May 12 | Meteor Garden II | —N/a | GMA / Q (now GMA News TV) | ABS-CBN / Jeepney TV |
| May 30 | Love Hotline | —N/a | GMA News TV | GMA |
| June 7 | Kapag nasa Katwiran, Ipaglaban Mo! | —N/a | GMA News TV | ABS-CBN (as Ipaglaban Mo!) |
| June 25 | Mankind: The Story of All of Us | —N/a | GMA News TV | GMA |
| July 12 | Superbook Reimagined | —N/a | GMA | ABS-CBN |
| August 3 | Family TV Mass | —N/a | IBC | GMA |
| October 6 | Avengers Assemble | —N/a | S+A | TV5 |
| October 6 | X-Men: The Animated Series | —N/a | ABS-CBN / Jack TV / Studio 23 (now S+A) | TV5 |

=== State-owned networks ===
| Date | Show | No. of seasons | Moved from | Moved to |
|---|---|---|---|---|
| January 4 | Be Alive | —N/a | GMA News TV | PTV |
| January 18 | Thunderbird Sabong Nation | —N/a | Studio 23 (now S+A) | IBC |
| January 19 | Sabong TV | —N/a | Studio 23 (now S+A) | IBC |
| May 9 | Real Lives, Real People with Jo Salcedo | —N/a | Light Network | PTV |
| May 10 | Lingkod Bayan ni Tony Falcon | —N/a | Light Network | PTV |
| June 2 | Hi-5 | —N/a | TV5 | ATC @ IBC |
| June 2 | The Two Sides of Ana (Ang Dalawang Mukha ni Ana) | —N/a | Telenovela Channel | ATC @ IBC |
| June 2 | Stoplight TV | —N/a | Pinoy Extreme | ATC @ IBC |
| June 7 | La Teniente | —N/a | Fox Filipino | ATC @ IBC |
| October 27 | PBA D-League Aspirant's Cup | 5 | AksyonTV | IBC |

=== Minor networks ===
| Date | Show | No. of seasons | Moved from | Moved to |
|---|---|---|---|---|
| January 18 | Friends Again | —N/a | Studio 23 (now S+A) | Light TV (now Light Network) |

=== Other channels ===
| Date | Show | No. of seasons | Moved from | Moved to |
|---|---|---|---|---|
| January 13 | White Lies | —N/a | TV5 | TeleAsia Filipino |
| January 18 | Thumbs Up | —N/a | Studio 23 (now S+A) | ANC |
| January 23 | Don't Cry, My Love | —N/a | TV5 | TeleAsia Filipino |
| January 26 | TV Healing Mass for the Homebound | —N/a | Studio 23 (now S+A) | Solar News Channel (now 9TV) |
| January 26 | Rockman.EXE Stream | —N/a | GMA | TeleAsia Filipino |
| January 29 | Love You a Thousand Times | —N/a | TV5 | TeleAsia Filipino |
| January 30 | Naruto: Shippuden | 5 | ABS-CBN | Hero |
| February 1 | Pink Lipstick | —N/a | TV5 | TeleAsia Filipino |
| February 1 | Shaider | —N/a | RPN (now 9TV) / PTV / ABS-CBN / IBC / GMA / Hero | TeleAsia Filipino |
| February 6 | Sons of Anarchy | 5 | Jack TV | Jack City |
| February 7 | House | 7 | 2nd Avenue | Jack City |
| February 8 | Digimon Tamers | —N/a | ABS-CBN | Hero |
| March 2 | CHInoyTV | —N/a | Net 25 | Living Asia Channel |
| March 18 | Fushigi Yugi | —N/a | TV5 | TeleAsia Filipino |
| March 20 | Arrested Development | —N/a | ETC | Jack TV |
| March 20 | Digimon Adventure 02 | —N/a | ABS-CBN | Hero |
| March 20 | Giant | —N/a | TV5 | TeleAsia Filipino |
| April 5 | Life Without Borders with Cory Quirino | —N/a | Studio 23 (now S+A) | ANC |
| April 6 | Gadget Boy | —N/a | GMA | TeleAsia Filipino |
| April 6 | Eyeshield 21 | 2 | ABS-CBN | Hero |
| April 11 | WWE Raw | —N/a | S+A | Fox Philippines |
| April 12 | WWE NXT | —N/a | S+A | Fox Philippines |
| April 17 | Flames of Desire | —N/a | TV5 | TeleAsia Filipino |
| April 29 | Ultraman Mebius | —N/a | ABS-CBN | S+A |
| May 4 | Young Minds Inspired | —N/a | PTV | GMA News TV |
| May 4 | Digimon Frontier | —N/a | ABS-CBN | Hero |
| May 9 | The Legend of Bruce Lee | —N/a | Q (now GMA News TV) | TeleAsia Filipino |
| May 16 | Night After Night | —N/a | Q (now GMA News TV) | TeleAsia Filipino |
| May 28 | Yatterman | —N/a | TV5 | TeleAsia Filipino |
| June 4 | Tactics | —N/a | Q (now GMA News TV) | TeleAsia Filipino |
| June 7 | Masked Rider Hibiki | —N/a | TV5 | TeleAsia Filipino |
| June 7 | The Bachelorette | —N/a | Diva Universal | TGC (now defunct) |
| June 9 | Likeable or Not | —N/a | TV5 | TeleAsia Filipino |
| June 9 | WWE Superstars | —N/a | S+A | Fox Sports Asia |
| June 15 | Eyeshield 21 | 3 | ABS-CBN | Hero |
| June 15 | Metal Fight Beyblade | —N/a | ABS-CBN | S+A |
| June 28 | Love of the Condor Heroes | —N/a | GMA | TeleAsia Filipino |
| June 28 | Knock Out | —N/a | GMA | TeleAsia Filipino |
| July 1 | Good Wife, Bad Wife | —N/a | TV5 | TeleAsia Filipino |
| July 7 | Cuidado con el ángel | —N/a | ABS-CBN (as Maria de Jesus: Ang Anghel sa Lansangan) | Telenovela Channel (as Don't Mess with an Angel) |
| July 13 | Time Between Dog and Wolf | —N/a | TV5 | TeleAsia Filipino |
| July 24 | Atashin'chi | 2 | GMA | TeleAsia Filipino |
| August 2 | Digimon Savers | —N/a | ABS-CBN | Hero |
| August 2 | A Gentleman's Dignity | —N/a | ABS-CBN | Jeepney TV |
| August 6 | Black & White | —N/a | TV5 | TeleAsia Filipino |
| August 20 | Masked Rider 555 | —N/a | GMA | TeleAsia Filipino |
| August 23 | Pokémon XY | 17 | GMA | 9TV |
| August 23 | Sesame Street | —N/a | GMA | 9TV |
| August 30 | Basketball Tribe | —N/a | ABS-CBN | TeleAsia Filipino |
| September 15 | Detective Loki | —N/a | TV5 | Hero |
| September 16 | Hunter × Hunter (1999) | —N/a | GMA | TeleAsia Filipino |
| September 22 | Yu-Gi-Oh! Zexal | 1 | ABS-CBN | S+A |
| September 22 | Hitman Reborn! | 4 | ABS-CBN | S+A |
| September 22 | Fated to Love You | —N/a | GMA | TeleAsia Filipino |
| September 29 | Heroman | —N/a | ABS-CBN / Hero | S+A |
| October 1 | Nura: Rise of the Yokai Clan | —N/a | ABS-CBN | S+A |
| October 7 | Glass Castle | —N/a | TV5 | TeleAsia Filipino |
| October 20 | Bakugan: New Vestroia | —N/a | GMA | TeleAsia Filipino |
| October 21 | The Legend | —N/a | GMA | TeleAsia Filipino |
| October 25 | Cinderella Man | —N/a | GMA | TeleAsia Filipino |
| October 25 | Queen Seon Deok | —N/a | GMA | TeleAsia Filipino |
| November 10 | Love or Bread | —N/a | ABS-CBN | Fox Filipino |
| November 17 | The Bachelor | —N/a | Diva Universal | TGC (now defunct) |
| November 17 | Baki the Grappler | —N/a | GMA | TeleAsia Filipino |
| December 1 | It Started With a Kiss | 1 | ABS-CBN | Fox Filipino |
| December 11 | Bakugan: Gundalian Invaders | —N/a | GMA | TeleAsia Filipino |
| December 17 | Shaman King | —N/a | GMA | TeleAsia Filipino |
| December 22 | Freestyle | —N/a | GMA | TeleAsia Filipino |
| December 23 | Dong Yi | —N/a | GMA | TeleAsia Filipino |
| December 27 | Helena's Promise | —N/a | ABS-CBN | Jeepney TV |

== Milestone episodes ==
The following shows made their Milestone episodes in 2014:

| Show | Network | Episode # | Episode title | Episode air date |
|---|---|---|---|---|
| Luv U | ABS-CBN | 100th | "Happy 100th episodes" | January 12 |
| The Vampire Diaries | ETC on SBN | 100th | "500 Years of Solitude" | January 28 |
| How I Met Your Mother | 2nd Avenue on RJTV | 200th | "How Your Mother Met Me" | January 30 |
| Reaksyon | TV5 | 400th | "Happy 100th Episode" | February 28 |
| Eat Bulaga! | GMA | 10,400th | "10,400th Episode" | March 8 |
| Wish Ko Lang! | GMA | 600th | "600th Episode" | March 8 |
| Glee | ETC / Jack TV | 100th | "100" | March 19 |
| ASAP 19 | ABS-CBN | 1,000th | "#ASAP1000" | April 6 |
| Be Careful with My Heart | ABS-CBN | 500th | "Baby Sky & Baby Sunshine's Baptism" | June 17 |
| 24 | Jack City on BEAM TV | 200th | "Day 9: 6:00 PM-7:00 pm" | June 17 |
| Aquino & Abunda Tonight | ABS-CBN | 100th | "Alex Gonzaga's Live Interview" | June 17 |
| WWE Raw | Fox | 1,100th | "#RAW1100" | June 25 |
| Pretty Little Liars | ETC on SBN | 100th | "Miss Me x 100" | July 9 |
| Eat Bulaga! | GMA | 10,500th | "10,500th Episode" | July 9 |
| Kapuso Mo, Jessica Soho | GMA | 500th | "Happy 500th episodes" | July 20 |
| Ikaw Lamang | ABS-CBN | 100th | "Right Path" | July 29 |
| Pepito Manaloto: Ang Tunay na Kuwento | GMA | 100th | "Happy 100th episodes" | August 9 |
| Parks and Recreation | Jack TV | 100th | "Second Chunce" | August 12 |
| Walang Tulugan with the Master Showman | GMA | 900th | "Happy 900th episodes" | August 16 |
| Face the People | TV5 | 200th | "Unico Hijo, Bugbog-Sarado kay Itay Habang si Nanay Nagwawalang-Kibo?" | August 19 |
| Sarap Diva | GMA | 100th | "Guest with Gabby Eigenmann and Gardo Versoza" | September 13 |
| Magpakailanman | GMA | 100th | "Ang Babaeng May Dalawang Buhay" ("The Monica 'Baby Face' Salazar Story") | September 13 |
| Ikaw Lamang | ABS-CBN | 150th | "True Colors" | October 3 |
| News.PH | 9TV | 100th | "Laude-Pemberton Case" | October 22 |
| The Half Sisters | GMA | 100th | "Dead Or Alive" | October 24 |
| Be Careful with My Heart | ABS-CBN | 600th | "600th Episodes" | October 28 |
| Day Off | GMA News TV | 500th | "Team Kramer" | November 1 |
| Celebrity Bluff | GMA | 100th | "Halloween Special" | November 1 |
| Eat Bulaga! | GMA | 10,600th | "10,600th Episode" | November 3 |
| Aquino & Abunda Tonight | ABS-CBN | 200th | "I Do Couples: Chris Tan & Karen Borador & Jericho Rosales' Live Interview" | November 4 |
| Reaksyon | TV5 | 500th | "500th Episode" | November 4 |
| The Ellen DeGeneres Show | 2nd Avenue on RJTV | 1,900th | "1,900th Show" | November 11 |
| Bones | Jack City | 200th | "The 200th in the 10th" | December 12 |
| WWE SmackDown | Fox | 800th | "Super SmackDown Live" | December 21 |

== Finales ==
=== Major networks ===
==== ABS-CBN ====
The following are programs that ended on ABS-CBN:

- January 5: FPJ: Da King on ABS-CBN
- January 24: Maria Mercedes
- January 31: When a Man Falls in Love
- February 21: Kuroko's Basketball season 1 (rerun), Minute to Win It, Naruto: Shippuden season 5 (rerun), Princess Hours (rerun) and Ultraman Mebius
- March 7: Got to Believe
- March 14: Crazy Love, Hiwaga, Honesto and Skip Beat!
- March 21: Annaliza
- March 23: Blade (Anime version) and X-Men (Anime version)
- March 28: Dōmo and Galema: Anak ni Zuma
- April 11: Mr. Bean: The Animated Series (rerun) and WansapanaSummer (season 2)
- April 19: Animazing Tales (rerun)
- April 25: My Girlfriend Is a Gumiho (rerun)
- April 26: The Biggest Loser Pinoy Edition: Doubles
- May 9: Meteor Garden (2001; rerun)
- May 11: Buzz ng Bayan
- May 17: Bet on Your Baby (season 1)
- May 23: Meteor Garden II (rerun)
- May 31: Sabado Specials: Shake, Rattle & Roll
- June 13: The Legal Wife
- June 21: Teenage Mutant Ninja Turtles
- June 22: Cheche Lazaro Presents
- June 27: Kapamilya Kiddie Blockbusters
- July 4: Mirabella
- July 8: Mr. Bean (rerun)
- July 11: The Heirs
- July 18: Dyesebel
- July 20: Wolverine (Anime version)
- July 27: The Voice Kids season 1
- August 2: Sine'skwela (rerun)
- August 9: I-Shine Talent Camp (season 3)
- August 15: Moon of Desire, My Girl (2005; rerun) and Pinoy Big Brother: All In Über
- August 24: Pinoy Big Brother: All In
- August 29: Lovers in Paris (2004; rerun) and The Singing Bee (season 5)
- September 19: Ana Manuela and Pretty Man
- September 26: Miss Ripley
- October 4: Superbook Reimagined (season 1)
- October 10: Kuroko's Basketball season 2, Naruto: Shippuden season 6, Precious Hearts Romances Presents: Midnight Phantom (rerun) and Sana Bukas Pa ang Kahapon
- October 24: Ikaw Lamang
- November 1: T.U.F.F. Puppy (season 1)
- November 14: Marcelino Pan y Vino (rerun) and Pure Love
- November 15: I Do
- November 21: Hawak Kamay
- November 28: Be Careful with My Heart
- November 30: Voltron Force
- December 5: Angel Eyes
- December 12: Princess Sarah (1985; rerun)

==== Stopped airing ====
- March 7: Metal Fight Beyblade: Baku (cancelled), Digimon Xros Wars (cancelled) and Yu-Gi-Oh! Duel Monsters (rerun)
- April 11: Yu-Gi-Oh! 5D's season 1 (rerun)

==== GMA ====
The following are programs that ended on GMA Network:

- January 17: GMA Blockbusters: Afternoon Edition
- January 18: Out of Control
- January 24: Kapuso Primetime Cinema Weekday Edition and Prinsesa ng Buhay Ko
- February 2: Born Impact: Born To Be Wild Weekend Edition
- February 14: Magkano Ba ang Pag-ibig?
- March 7: Adarna
- March 14: Tale of Arang: A Love Without End
- March 16: True Horror Stories
- March 21: Flame of Recca (rerun)
- March 28: Paraiso Ko'y Ikaw
- April 16: GMA SineBabad
- April 19: Paddle Pop Adventures
- May 9: Chef Boy Logro: Kusina Master
- May 15: A 100-Year Legacy
- May 23: Carmela: Ang Pinakamagandang Babae sa Mundong Ibabaw, Mischievous Kiss: Love in Tokyo and The Borrowed Wife
- May 30: Fairy Tail season 1 (rerun) and Rhodora X
- June 6: Villa Quintana (2013)
- June 15: Picture! Picture!
- June 19: Human Planet
- June 20: Innamorata
- June 27: Kambal Sirena
- June 28: Toriko (season 1)
- June 29: Superbook (1981)
- June 30: My Love from the Star
- July 6: Kap's Amazing Stories
- July 10: The Master's Sun
- July 18: The Tim Yap Show (season 3)
- July 27: Sine De Kalibre
- August 15: Detective Conan season 7, Fairy Tail season 2 and One Piece season 9
- August 29: Jewel in the Palace (rerun)
- September 11: Mankind: The Story of All of Us and Secret Love
- September 12: Niño
- September 19: Ang Dalawang Mrs. Real
- September 28: Sa Puso ni Dok
- October 3: My BFF
- October 7: Serial Killer Earth
- October 10: Dading
- October 16: I Hear Your Voice
- October 17: My Destiny
- October 30: Seasons of Love
- October 31: Elemento and Full House (2004; rerun)
- November 7:
  - Return of the Wife
  - Balitang Ilokano (GMA Ilocos)
  - Balitang Amianan (GMA Dagupan)
  - Baretang Bikol (GMA Bicol)
  - Balitang Bisdak (GMA Cebu)
  - Ratsada (GMA Iloilo)
  - Testigo (GMA Davao)
  - Testigo Northern Mindanao (GMA Cagayan de Oro)
- November 14: Ilustrado
- November 27: Planet Earth
- November 28: Bantatay (rerun)
- December 5: The Medyo Late Night Show with Jojo A.
- December 6: Marian
- December 12: Coffee Prince (2007; rerun)
- December 22: Don't Lose the Money
- December 28: Bet ng Bayan and Family TV Mass

==== Stopped airing ====
- August 29: Slam Dunk (rerun) (reason: programming break and resumed on January 6, 2015)

==== TV5 ====
The following are programs that ended on TV5:

- January 9: Positive
- January 16: For Love or Money
- January 18: What's Up Doods?
- January 24: You Are My Destiny
- January 25: Sabado Sinerama
- January 26: Sunday Sineplex and The Mega and the Songwriter
- January 31: Sine Ko 5ingko and Sine Ko 5ingko Premiere
- February 6: Dayo
- February 28: Madam Chairman
- March 9: Philip: Lifestyle Guy
- March 15: Magic? Gimik Revealed and Pinoy Explorer
- March 28: Let's Ask Pilipinas (seasons 1 and 2)
- April 10: Obsession
- April 24: Asia's Next Top Model cycle 2
- April 26: Killer Karaoke: Pinoy Naman
- April 27: Generator Rex, Sym-Bionic Titan and The Marvelous Misadventures of Flapjack
- May 2: Good Morning Club
- May 28: History with Lourd (season 1)
- May 29: Bigtime
- May 30: Astig
- May 31: Pilipinas News Weekend (Saturday edition)
- June 6: Showbiz Police: Una sa Eksena
- June 15: Wow Mali Pa Rin!
- June 20: Confessions of a Torpe, and Face the People (season 2)
- June 21: Tropa Mo Ko Unli
- June 28: Celebrity Dance Battle
- July 4: Beki Boxer and Juan Experiment ng Juan Direction
- July 4: Star Confessions (rerun)
- July 5: One of the Boys
- July 12: Aksyon Weekend
- July 13: Balitang 60 (5am replay) and Pilipinas News Weekend (Sunday edition)
- July 14: Word of the Lourd
- July 15: Mondo Manu
- July 16: Take Out
- July 17: Astig! (5-minute segment)
- July 18: Fish Hooks (rerun), Gargoyles, Good Morning Ser, Kick Buttowski: Suburban Daredevil (rerun), Kwentong Kanto, Pilipinas News and T3: Reload
- July 19: Adventure Time, Dexter's Laboratory and The Amazing World of Gumball and Yin Yang Yo!
- August 3: Jasmine
- August 22: Cool Guys, Hot Ramen
- August 23: It Takes Gutz to be a Gutierrez (season 1)
- September 19: Bride of the Century
- October 3: Juan Direction Islanders
- November 21: Avengers Assemble, Face the People (season 3) and Let's Ask Pilipinas (season 3)
- December 7: The Amazing Race Philippines (season 2)
- December 12: Handy Manny (rerun) and Mickey Mouse Clubhouse (rerun)
- December 13: Talentadong Pinoy 2014
- December 27: Trenderas

==== Stopped airing ====
- February 21: Likeable or Not (reason: series break)
- June 7: SpinNation (season 2) (reason: series break)

=== State-owned networks ===
==== PTV ====
The following are programs that ended on People's Television Network:

- February 23: Biyahero
- March 14: Gov @ Work
- April 26: Agrikultura ETC
- June 1: News @ 1: Junior Edition
- June 14: News @ 1: The Week That Was
- July 13: Prayer for the Holy Souls in Purgatory
- July 25: Say Mo, Sec?
- August 29: Balitaan
- August 30: The Doctor Is In: Kalusugan Pangkahalatan
- December 31: Family Rosary Crusade

==== Unknown dates ====
- 3 O'Clock Divine Mercy Prayer
- CameraGeekTV: Pinoy Best Shot
- Family Matters
- Fitness and Health, Good Life, Good Health, True Health, Health and Fitness
- Jesus the Healer
- Kasama Natin ang Diyos
- Lakbay Pinas
- Lingkod Bayan ni Tony Falcon
- The Hour of Great Mercy
- Upload
- Winner TV Shopping

==== IBC ====
The following are programs that ended on IBC:

- March 14: Gov @ Work
- July 25: Say Mo, Sec?
- August 29: Animalia, Gadgets & Gizmos, Hi-5, RioMania: Football Fanatics, Stoplight TV and The Two Sides of Ana (Ang Dalawang Mukha ni Ana)
- August 30: Amazing World of Automobiles, Beyond Stardom, Boost, Cultural Flavours, La Teniente and The Big Planet
- August 31: A to Z of Motorsport, Cinema Nouveau, Culture Flavours, Fame, Fashion Memoir and Retro TV (rerun)
- December 28: Shalom

==== Unknown dates ====
- Noli Me Tangere
- Travel and Trade (rerun)
- Travel: Philippines (rerun)

=== Minor networks ===
The following are programs that ended on minor networks:

- February 16: CHInoyTV on Net 25
- April 4: TRiBE: Tayo Ito! on Net 25
- April 11: Class7 Civil Servant on Net 25
- May 30: Focus AEC: ASEAN Economy Community on Net 25
- June 15: Klima ng Pagbabago and Talking Heads on Net 25
- July 8: UNTV Cup (season 2) on UNTV
- August 4: Huntahan on UNTV
- August 29: Pep News on Net 25
- September 27: Ignite Gospel Music Festival (season 2) on Light Network
- October 14: UNTV Cup Off-Season: Clash of the Three on UNTV
- October 25: Barangay Basketball on Net 25
- November 7: Flower I Am on Net 25

==== Unknown dates ====
- Star Mill: CLTV 36's Star Search (season 2) on CLTV 36
- Friends Again, Lingkod Bayan with Tony Falcon, Real Lives, Real People, Superbook (1981), The Flying House, This New Life and VeggieTales on Light Network
- ChiNoy Star Ka Na!, Fil-Am Jams and The Snow Queen (rerun) on Net 25
- My OFW Story, Police and Other Matters and Serbisyo Publiko on UNTV

=== Other channels ===
- January 2: Pangarap na Bituin on Jeepney TV
- January 3: Rated Korina on DZMM TeleRadyo
- January 10: The Office season 4 on Fox Channel Philippines
- January 10: Studio 23 Presents on Studio 23 (now S+A)
- January 11: Brand X with Russell Brand on Jack TV
- January 11: Asenso Pinoy, Generation RX, Pinoy T.A.L.K., Sabong TV and Sel-J Motocross TV on Studio 23 (now S+A)
- January 12: ABS-CBN Sports presents Top Rank Boxing, Agribusiness: How It Works, Family Rosary Crusade, Friends Again, FPJ: Ang Nag-Iisang Alamat, Gag U, Sagupaan TV and The Word Exposed with Luis Antonio Cardinal Tagle on Studio 23 (now S+A)
- January 13: NCIS: Los Angeles season 3 on Studio 23 (now S+A)
- January 14: Missing on Studio 23 (now S+A)
- January 15: America's Next Great Restaurant on TGC
- January 15: Once Upon a Time season 1 and The Ultimate Fighter on Studio 23 (now S+A)
- January 16: Back at the Barnyard, Barkada Nights, Bilis Balita, Iba-Balita, Jeepney TV Tawa-Way Zone, LBO: Lunch Box Office, Looney Tunes, Myx, O Shopping, Off the Map, Revenge, Scandal and Wonder Pets! on Studio 23 (now S+A)
- January 16: The Biggest Loser season 10: Pay It Forward on TGC
- January 19: Familia Zaragoza on Jeepney TV
- January 21: Bakekang on Fox Filipino
- January 22: My Name is Kim Sam Soon on TeleAsia Filipino
- January 25: Power Rangers Samurai on Hero
- January 25: Baki the Grappler on TeleAsia Filipino
- January 28: What's for Dinner? on TeleAsia Filipino
- January 31: Moonlight on Fox Channel Philippines
- January 31: Gintama season 1 on Hero
- January 31: Cheer Up on Love on TeleAsia Filipino
- February 1: Driven to Extremes, Marvel Knights and Silver Surfer on S+A
- February 3: The Carrie Diaries season 2 on ETC
- February 4: Powerhouse on GMA News TV
- February 5: Yu-Gi-Oh! Zexal on Hero
- February 5: GT Academy on S+A
- February 6: The Tonight Show with Jay Leno on My Movie Channel
- February 7: Ravenswood on ETC
- February 7: Supa Strikas on S+A
- February 7: High Kick! on TeleAsia Filipino
- February 8: Front Row on GMA News TV
- February 8: The Best of Anderson Live on Solar News Channel
- February 9: Sports Pilipinas on GMA News TV
- February 9: SEA Games Myanmar 2013 Sinag Pilipinas on S+A
- February 10: American Horror Story: Coven on Jack TV
- February 12: Fashbook on GMA News TV
- February 14: Love Hotline on GMA News TV
- February 15: Balita Pilipinas Primetime and Follow The Star on GMA News TV
- February 17: The Office season 5 on Fox Channel Philippines
- February 21: Gagambino on Fox Filipino
- February 21: A Woman of Steel and La Madrastra (rerun) on Telenovela Channel
- February 24: Mega Fashion Crew: Reloaded on ETC
- February 25: Louie season 2 on Jack TV
- February 26: Super Fun Night on ETC
- February 27: Joey (season 1) on Fox Channel Philippines
- March 1: Power Rangers Super Samurai on Hero
- March 5: UAAP Season 76 Men's volleyball tournament on Balls and S+A
- March 6: Tanging Yaman on Jeepney TV
- March 9: Tabing Ilog on Jeepney TV
- March 9: Asian Tour Highlights, Avengers Assemble, J.League Highlights and The Healing Eucharist on S+A
- March 10: Freedom Riders Asia and WWE NXT on S+A
- March 12: WWE Superstars on S+A
- March 13: WWE Tough Enough on S+A
- March 14: Ang TV on Jeepney TV
- March 14: WWE Raw on S+A
- March 15: UAAP Season 76 Women's volleyball tournament on Balls and S+A
- March 17: Rockman.EXE Stream on TeleAsia Filipino
- March 19: Hitman Reborn! season 3 on Hero
- March 19: Queen of Reversals on TeleAsia Filipino
- March 20: Digimon Adventure on Hero
- March 21: The Office season 6 on Fox Channel Philippines
- March 21: Triumph of Love on Telenovela Channel
- March 23: Philippine Book of Records on GMA News TV
- March 23: Pop Myx The Crazy Late Night Show (season 2) on Myx and Solar News Channel
- March 24: Shaider on TeleAsia Filipino
- March 26: Pretty Little Liars season 4 on ETC
- March 27: Sons of Anarchy season 5 on Jack City
- March 27: Top Chef Masters season 4 on TGC
- March 28: Glamorosa on Fox Filipino
- March 28: Joey (season 2) and White Collar (season 3) on Fox Channel Philippines
- March 28: Rubi on Jeepney TV
- April 3: How I Met Your Mother season 9 on 2nd Avenue
- April 4: Gameday with Boom on Balls
- April 4: Gintama season 4 on Hero
- April 4: Rafaela (rerun) on Telenovela Channel
- April 5: Boarding Pass on GMA News TV
- April 5: Fringe season 4 on Jack City
- April 5: Kaya Mo Bang!: The Fudgee Barr Adventures (season 1) on S+A
- April 5: The Prince of Tennis on TeleAsia Filipino
- April 6: Sa Sandaling Kailangan Mo Ako on Jeepney TV
- April 7: Juan Direction on AksyonTV
- April 9: Asia's Next Top Model cycle 2 on Star World
- April 10: Iisa Pa Lamang on Jeepney TV
- April 11: Big Love (rerun) on Telenovela Channel
- April 14: Ang Tanging Ina on Jeepney TV
- April 16: Love You a Thousand Times on TeleAsia Filipino
- April 17: Magkaribal on Jeepney TV
- April 19: Something to Chew On (season 1) on Solar News Channel
- April 20: What I See (season 2) on Solar News Channel
- April 21: Merlin season 4 on Jack TV
- April 22: The Crazy Ones on 2nd Avenue
- April 22: Ironside on Jack City
- April 22: Gokusen (season 1) on TeleAsia Filipino
- April 23: Suits season 3 on Jack TV
- April 24: The Office season 7 on Fox Channel Philippines
- April 24: Bubble Gang and Comedy Bar on Fox Filipino
- April 24: Naruto: Shippuden season 5 on Hero
- April 25: The Middle season 4 on 2nd Avenue
- April 25: Super Inggo on Jeepney TV
- April 26: Power Rangers Jungle Fury on Hero
- April 28: Kuroko's Basketball season 1 (rerun) on Hero
- April 30: Kitchen Millionaire on TGC
- May 2: Good Morning Club on AksyonTV
- May 3: Digimon Tamers on Hero
- May 3: Agimat: Ang Mga Alamat ni Ramon Revilla: Tonyong Bayawak on Jeepney TV
- May 4: The Following season 2 on Jack City
- May 6: America's Got Talent season 7 on TGC
- May 8: Fushigi Yuugi and Pink Lipstick on TeleAsia Filipino
- May 8: Fat March on TGC
- May 9: Gintama season 5 on Hero
- May 9: Meteor Garden (2001) on Jeepney TV
- May 9: In the Name of Love (rerun) on Telenovela Channel
- May 10: Alphas (season 2) and The Tomorrow People on Jack TV
- May 12: Project Runway season 11 on ETC
- May 12: Dollhouse season 2 on Fox Channel Philippines
- May 12: Gokusen (season 2) on TeleAsia Filipino
- May 14: Glee season 5 and New Girl season 3 on ETC
- May 14: Glee (season 5) on Jack TV
- May 15: Chuck season 5, One Tree Hill season 3, The Finder and Without a Trace season 3 on Fox Channel Philippines
- May 15: Arrow season 2 on Jack City
- May 15: Arrow (season 2) and Two and a Half Men season 11 on Jack TV
- May 15: White Lies on TeleAsia Filipino
- May 16: Star-Crossed on ETC
- May 16: Almost Human, Cold Case season 2, Ghost Whisperer season 3 and Numbers season 4 on Fox Channel Philippines
- May 16: Asian Treasures on Fox Filipino
- May 17: The Originals season 1 on ETC
- May 17: Kitchen Stories on GMA News TV
- May 17: The Big Bang Theory season 7 on Jack TV
- May 19: The Amazing Race 24 on AXN Asia
- May 19: Elementary (season 2) on Jack City
- May 19: Bones season 7, House season 3 and Lost season 6 on Fox Channel Philippines
- May 19: Top Chef season 9 on TGC
- May 20: Hart of Dixie season 3 on 2nd Avenue
- May 20: The Vampire Diaries season 5 on ETC
- May 20: 24 season 6, Angel season 2, Buffy the Vampire Slayer season 5 and The Unit season 2 on Fox Channel Philippines
- May 20: Hitman Reborn! season 4 on Hero
- May 21: The Voice season 6 on AXN Asia
- May 21: The Catalina (rerun) on ETC
- May 21: Lie to Me (season 2), Smallville season 5 and Veronica Mars season 1 on Fox Channel Philippines
- May 21: Bones season 9 on Jack City
- May 22: American Idol season 13 on ETC
- May 22: Those Who Kill on Jack City
- May 22: Survivor: Cagayan on Jack TV
- May 22: John En Shirley and May Minamahal on Jeepney TV
- May 23: Princess Sarah (2007) on Jeepney TV
- May 25: 2014 Shakey's V-League 1st Conference on GMA News TV
- May 25: American Dad season 10, Family Guy season 12 and The Simpsons season 25 on Jack TV
- May 26: Grimm season 3 on Jack City and Jack TV
- May 26: Balitang Europe and Balitang Middle East on ANC
- May 27: Richard Loves Lucy on Jeepney TV
- May 27: Gadget Boy on TeleAsia Filipino
- May 28: Modern Family season 5 on 2nd Avenue
- May 28: Friends with Better Lives on ETC
- May 28: The Office season 8 on Fox Channel Philippines
- May 28: Blood Lad on Hero
- May 28: Rasing Hope season 4 on Jack TV
- May 29: Revolution (season 2) on Jack TV
- May 30: Psych season 6 on Jack City
- May 30: Solar Daybreak on Myx (only aired on Solar News Channel {now 9TV})
- May 31: Pilipinas News Weekend (Saturday edition) on AksyonTV
- June 1: Bob's Burgers season 4 on Jack TV
- June 1: The Score: Filoil Flying V Hanes Pre-Season Premier Cup Recap on S+A
- June 1: Night After Night on TeleAsia Filipino
- June 2: A Day in the Life (season 1; rerun) on Jack TV
- June 3: Bakuman on TeleAsia Filipino
- June 5: Patayin sa Sindak si Barbara on Jeepney TV
- June 6: All About Eve (2009) on Fox Filipino
- June 6: Little Battlers eXperience and Spider-Man Unlimited on S+A
- June 6: Gokusen (season 3) on TeleAsia Filipino
- June 6: The League (season 3) on TGC
- June 8: Road to Rio on Balls and S+A
- June 8: The Americans season 2 on Jack City
- June 9: Zero Hour on S+A
- June 11: Digimon Adventure 02 on Hero
- June 11: Motive (season 1) on Jack City
- June 12: 2 Broke Girls season 3 on ETC
- June 12: America's Next Top Model cycle 13 on Lifestyle
- June 13: The Ellen DeGeneres Show season 11 on 2nd Avenue
- June 13: Goin' Bulilit Classics on Jeepney TV
- June 14: 666 Park Avenue (rerun) on Jack TV
- June 14: Bora: Sons of the Beach on Jeepney TV
- June 15: Eyeshield 21 (season 2) on Hero
- June 16: Ben and Kate (rerun) on 2nd Avenue
- June 16: NCIS season 9 on Jack City
- June 17: Flames of Desire on TeleAsia Filipino
- June 18: Gintama': Enchōsen on Hero
- June 18: Covert Affairs (season 4) on Jack City
- June 21: Power Rangers Operation Overdrive on Hero
- June 21: Super Inggo 1.5: Ang Bagong Bangis on Jeepney TV
- June 22: Kuroko's Basketball (season 1; rerun) on Hero
- June 26: Arrested Development season 4 on Jack TV
- June 27: The Legend of Bruce Lee on TeleAsia Filipino
- June 28: Undercover Boss Canada (season 1) on Solar News Channel
- June 28: The Office season 9 on Fox Channel Philippines
- June 29: Ultraman Mebius on Hero
- June 29: The 100 (season 1) on Jack TV
- June 30: The Fashion Fund (season 1) on ETC
- June 30: The Mentalist season 4 on Jack City
- June 30: Go, Diego, Go! on S+A
- June 30: Don't Cry My Love, Giant and Tactics on TeleAsia Filipino
- July 3: The Wedding Band (rerun) and Witches of East End season 1 on 2nd Avenue
- July 3: Nikita season 4 on ETC
- July 3: A Day in the Life (season 2) on Jack TV
- July 4: Codename: Asero and The Sisters on Fox Filipino
- July 4: House season 7 on Jack City
- July 4: Meteor Garden II Uncut and Minsan Lang Kita Iibigin on Jeepney TV
- July 4: Marimar (rerun) on Telenovela Channel
- July 5: Dis Is Pinas on GMA News TV
- July 5: Fringe season 5 on Jack City
- July 5: Brooklyn Nine-Nine season 1 on Jack TV
- July 6: It Takes Gutz to be a Gutierrez (season 1) on E!
- July 10: Beauty & the Beast season 2 on ETC
- July 11: Web Therapy season 2 on 2nd Avenue
- July 11: Andar ng mga Balita on AksyonTV
- July 12: Aksyon Weekend on AksyonTV
- July 12: Sakurano 3 + 1 on TeleAsia Filipino
- July 13: Aksyon Breaking, Balitang 60 and Pilipinas News Weekend (Sunday edition) on AksyonTV
- July 14: Touchline: FIFA World Cup Highlights on Balls and S+A
- July 15: Back in the Game on 2nd Avenue
- July 15: 24: Live Another Day on Jack City
- July 17: Chicago P.D. season 1 on Jack City
- July 18: Guys with Kids (rerun) on 2nd Avenue
- July 18: Good Morning Ser, Pilipinas News and T3: Reload on AksyonTV
- July 18: Klasmeyts on Jeepney TV
- July 18: Solar News Cebuano, Solar Daybreak, Solar Network News, Solar Newsday, Solar Nightly News on Solar News Channel
- July 20: Solar Headlines on Solar News Channel
- July 21: Bachelor Pad (season 2) on ETC
- July 23: Cuticle Detective Inaba, Jigoku Shoujo (rerun) and The Legend of the Legendary Heroes on Hero
- July 23: Yatterman (2008) on TeleAsia Filipino
- July 24: Sirens (season 1) and The Office (season 8; rerun) on Jack TV
- July 24: Masked Rider Hibiki on TeleAsia Filipino
- July 25: Ultraman Mebius on S+A
- July 26: Sports Talk on DZMM TeleRadyo
- July 26: Defiance season 1 (rerun) and The Big Bang Theory season 6 (rerun) on Jack TV
- July 26: 2014 PSL All-Filipino Conference on Solar Sports
- July 27: Young Minds Inspired (season 2) on GMA News TV
- July 27: Digimon Frontier on Hero
- July 27: Top Gear season 16 on Solar News Channel
- July 28: The New Normal (rerun) on 2nd Avenue
- July 29: Camp and Ready for Love on ETC
- July 30: Donut Showdown (season 1) on 2nd Avenue
- July 31: Dora the Explorer on S+A
- July 31: Trigun on Hero
- July 31: Chicago Fire season 2 on Jack City
- August 1: Law & Order: Special Victims Unit season 12 on Jack City
- August 5: Royal Pains (season 5) on Jack City
- August 5: Revolution (season 1; rerun) on Jack TV
- August 5: Love of the Condor Heroes (2006) and Time Between Dog and Wolf on TeleAsia Filipino
- August 7: Best Ink (season 2) on Jack TV
- August 7: Basta't Kasama Kita on Jeepney TV
- August 8: Coffee Prince (2012) on TeleAsia Filipino
- August 9: Being Human season 4 on Jack TV
- August 10: Building Bryks on 2nd Avenue
- August 10: Eyeshield 21 (season 3) on Hero
- August 11: Top Chef season 11 on 2nd Avenue
- August 11: Alphas (season 1; rerun) and Salem season 1 on Jack TV
- August 13: Ground Floor (season 1) on Jack TV
- August 15: Joaquin Bordado on Fox Filipino
- August 15: My Girl (2005) on Jeepney TV
- August 16: About a Boy (season 1) and Bates Motel season 1 (rerun) on Jack TV
- August 16: Late Show with David Letterman on Solar News Channel
- August 17: Agimat: Ang Mga Alamat ni Ramon Revilla: Pepeng Agimat on Jeepney TV
- August 19: Shin Mazinger Edition Z on TeleAsia Filipino
- August 20: The Boston: The Kitchen Musical on Lifestyle
- August 21: Gang Related on Jack City
- August 22: Go On (rerun) on 2nd Avenue
- August 22: Power Rangers Samurai on S+A
- August 23: Saturday Night Live season 39 on Jack TV
- August 24: Knife Fight (season 1) on 2nd Avenue
- August 26: The Rachel Zoe Project (season 5) on ETC
- August 27: Atashin'chi (season 2) on TeleAsia Filipino
- August 28: Imortal on Jeepney TV
- August 29: The Millionaire Matchmaker (season 5) on ETC
- August 29: Black & White on TeleAsia Filipino
- August 30: Surviving Jack on Jack TV
- August 30: The Today Show on 9TV
- August 31: 2014 Shakey's V-League Open Conference on GMA News TV
- September 1: Legal Help Desk on 9TV
- September 2, 3: America's Got Talent season 8 on TGC
- September 3: Undateable (season 1) on Jack TV
- September 5: It's Always Sunny in Philadelphia season 8 (rerun) on Jack TV
- September 5: Kung Fu Kids on Jeepney TV
- September 6: Sailor Moon S on Hero
- September 6: Inside Edition on 9TV
- September 7: Tyrant (season 1) on Jack City
- September 7: G-mik on Jeepney TV
- September 9: Gintama (season 4; rerun) on Hero
- September 9: Parks and Recreation season 6 on Jack TV
- September 11: Restaurant Takeover (season 1) on 2nd Avenue
- September 12: Captain Barbell (2006) on Fox Filipino
- September 14: Small Acts, Big Stories on 9TV
- September 15: Merlin season 5 on Jack TV
- September 15: Knock Out on TeleAsia Filipino
- September 16: Graceland (season 2) on Jack City
- September 16: Wilfred season 4 on Jack TV
- September 16: Heaven's Dragon on TeleAsia Filipino
- September 17: Parenthood season 5 on 2nd Avenue
- September 19: Kambal sa Uma on Jeepney TV
- September 19: Basketball Tribe and Likeable or Not on TeleAsia Filipino
- September 19: A Woman of Steel (rerun) and The Power of Destiny on Telenovela Channel
- September 19: Spider-Man Unlimited (rerun) and Supa Strikas (rerun) on S+A
- September 21: Top Gear season 17 on 9TV
- September 22: Yu-Gi-Oh! 5D's season 2 on Hero
- September 23: Louie season 3 on Jack TV
- September 24: Kdabra (season 1) on Fox Filipino
- September 24: Thomas & Friends on S+A
- September 24: Kuroko's Basketball season 2 on Hero
- September 26: Reign season 1 on ETC
- September 26: Reckless on Jack City
- September 26: The Mindy Project (season 2) on 2nd Avenue
- September 28: The Middle season 5 on 2nd Avenue
- September 28: Brand X with Russell Brand (rerun) on Jack TV
- September 28: Agimat: Ang Mga Alamat ni Ramon Revilla: Elias Paniki on Jeepney TV
- September 29: Project Runway All Stars season 2 on ETC
- September 30: Digimon Xros Wars on Hero
- September 30: Battleground and Legit (season 2) on Jack TV
- September 30: Metal Fight Beyblade on S+A
- October 2: Kahit Isang Saglit on Jeepney TV
- October 2: Karera Pilipinas (season 1) on SLBN
- October 4: Growing Up Fisher on 2nd Avenue
- October 4: UAAP Season 77 Women's basketball tournament on Balls and S+A
- October 6, 13: Top Chef season 10 on TGC
- October 7: Kdabra (season 2) on Fox Filipino
- October 7: Good Wife, Bad Wife on TeleAsia Filipino
- October 8: Chef Roblé & Co. (season 2) on 2nd Avenue
- October 9: Masked Rider 555 on TeleAsia Filipino
- October 9: Witches of East End season 2 on 2nd Avenue
- October 11: Pasada Sais Trenta Sabado on DZMM TeleRadyo
- October 11: The Strain (season 1) on Jack City
- October 12: RahXephon and Skull Man on Hero
- October 14: How I Met Your Mother season 1 on Fox Channel Philippines
- October 15: Smash: Covers Project on 2nd Avenue
- October 15: UAAP Season 77 Men's basketball tournament on Balls and S+A
- October 15: Kdabra (season 3) on Fox Filipino
- October 17: Boys Over Flowers on Jeepney TV
- October 17: Spider-Man and His Amazing Friends on S+A
- October 18: Sean Saves the World on 2nd Avenue
- October 18: Defiance season 2 on Jack TV
- October 19: Eat, Drink, Love on 2nd Avenue
- October 19: Etcetera (season 5) on ETC
- October 19: Digimon Savers and Hitman Reborn! (season 4; rerun) on Hero
- October 19: Bakugan Battle Brawlers on TeleAsia Filipino
- October 20: Detective Loki on Hero
- October 21: Rush on Jack City
- October 22: Kung Fu Soccer on TeleAsia Filipino
- October 23: K-On! on TeleAsia Filipino
- October 24: 1600 Penn on 2nd Avenue
- October 24: Dallas (season 3) on Jack City
- October 24: Ako si Kim Samsoon and All About Eve (2009) on TeleAsia Filipino
- October 24: Team Umizoomi on S+A
- October 25: Kaya Mo Bang?: The Fudgee Barr Adventures (season 2) on S+A
- October 25, November 1: The Bachelorette season 9 on TGC
- October 26: Legends (season 1) on Jack City
- October 26: Doowee Donut Hooper and Drumline Competition (season 1) on S+A
- October 27: Bates Motel season 2 on Jack TV
- October 28: Fate/kaleid liner Prisma Illya on Hero
- October 30: Fated to Love You (Taiwanese version) on TeleAsia Filipino
- October 31: Naruto: Shippuden season 6 on Hero
- November 1: The Queen Latifah Show season 1 on 2nd Avenue
- November 1: Power Rangers Samurai (rerun) on Hero
- November 3: Brickleberry (season 2) on Jack TV
- November 4: Heroman on S+A
- November 7: Enchanted Garden on Fox Filipino
- November 7: My Binondo Girl on Jeepney TV
- November 7: Bubble Guppies on S+A
- November 13: How I Met Your Mother season 2 on Fox Channel Philippines
- November 14: It's Always Sunny in Philadelphia season 9 (rerun) on Jack TV
- November 14: Maging Sino Ka Man (2006) on Jeepney TV
- November 14: The League (season 4) on TGC
- November 15: A Gentleman's Dignity on Jeepney TV
- November 16: Life of Riley on 2nd Avenue
- November 16: 2014 Shakey's V-League Reinforced Open Conference on GMA News TV
- November 16: K-On!! on TeleAsia Filipino
- November 19: Gintama (season 5; rerun) on Hero
- November 20: Splash U.S. on TGC
- November 20: Nandito Ako on Fox Filipino
- November 21: The Legend on TeleAsia Filipino
- November 23: Animazing Tales on Hero
- November 24: Mistresses UK on 2nd Avenue
- November 24: Majestic Prince on Hero
- November 27: American Dream Builders on 2nd Avenue
- November 27: Love or Bread on Fox Filipino
- November 28: Stylized on ETC
- November 28: Elemento on GMA News TV
- November 28: Best Ink (season 3) on Jack TV
- November 28: Invincible Shan Bao Mei on TeleAsia Filipino
- November 29: Boys Ride Out (season 1) on 9TV
- November 30: 2014 PSL Grand Prix Conference on Solar Sports
- December 2: Katorse on Jeepney TV
- December 5: Pure Love (2011) on Jeepney TV
- December 5: Triumph of Love (rerun) on Telenovela Channel
- December 6: Kokey at Ako on Jeepney TV
- December 7: Power Rangers Super Samurai on Hero
- December 8: America's Next Top Model cycle 21 on ETC
- December 8: Initial D: First Stage on Hero
- December 8: Chozen on Jack TV
- December 10: Bakugan: New Vestoria on TeleAsia Filipino
- December 11: How I Met Your Mother season 2 on Fox Channel Philippines
- December 11: Yakitate!! Japan (rerun) on Hero
- December 11: Cinderella Man on TeleAsia Filipino
- December 12: The Clash: Search for the Next Great Dessert Master on Lifestyle
- December 13: I'll Still Love You 10 Years from Now on Jeepney TV
- December 16: Hunter × Hunter (1999) on TeleAsia Filipino
- December 17: The Voice season 7 on AXN Asia
- December 17: The Chair U.S. on TGC
- December 18: Survivor: San Juan del Sur on Jack TV
- December 19: Luna Blanca on Fox Filipino
- December 20: The Amazing Race 25 on AXN Asia
- December 21: Starlit on TeleAsia Filipino
- December 22: Glass Castle on TeleAsia Filipino
- December 22: Top Town on TGC
- December 23: The Unit season 3 on Fox TV Philippines
- December 23: Heavenly Beauty on TeleAsia Filipino
- December 23: Going Straight on TGC
- December 25: It Started with a Kiss (season 1) on Fox Filipino
- December 26: Hitman Reborn! (season 4) on S+A
- December 26: News plus on S+A
- December 27: Pinay Beauty Queen Academy (season 1) on GMA News TV
- December 30: Winners & Losers season 1 on 2nd Avenue
- December 30: Ouran High School Host Club on Hero
- December 31: Home Shopping Network on 9TV

==== Unknown dates ====
- Bata, Bida Ka, Batas 101, Batas at Balita, Defense Corner, Doctors on Call, Doktor ng Masa, Magandang Umaga, Pilipinas Sabado, May Bagong Pag-asa, MBC Network Center, Musika, Atbp., Operation Tulong: Saturday Edition, Operation Tulong: Sunday Edition, Piece of Air, RH Balita @ 9:30 am, RH Ratsada Balita, Sagot sa Bayan and SEX: Showbiz and Entertainment Xpress on DZRH News Television

==== Stopped airing ====
- February 28: Gintama season 2 on Hero
- June 22: NBA Action on S+A
- June 27: TKO: Tanghali Knockouts on GMA News TV
- September 26: Sports Desk on Solar Sports

== Networks ==
The following is a list of Free-to-Air and Local Cable Networks making noteworthy launches and closures during 2014.

=== Launches ===
| Date | Station | Channel | Source |
|---|---|---|---|
| February 14 | MTV Pinoy | | |
| March 27 | RTL CBS Extreme | SkyCable Channel 209 | |
| April 16 | beIN Sports 1 | SkyCable Channel 204 (HD) | |
| May 31 | Disney XD (Southeast Asia) | Cignal Channel 215 (HD) | |
| June 2 | ATC @ IBC | 13 | |
| August 1 | HITS | SkyCable Channel 137 | |
| August 2 | Cinema One Premium | SkyCable Channel 242 | |
| October 1 | Tagalized Movie Channel | SkyCable Channel 80 | |
| October 15 | Sony Channel Philippines | SkyCable Channel 35; Destiny Cable Channel 62 | |
| December 31 | AMC Asia | SkyCable Channel 106 (Digital); Cablelink Channel 50 | |
| Unknown | Ang Dating Daan Television (ADDTV) | Channel 38 (DTT) | |

=== Rebranded ===
The following is a list of television stations that have made or will make noteworthy network rebranded in 2014.

| Date | Rebranded from | Rebranded to | Channel | Source |
|---|---|---|---|---|
| January 18 | Studio 23 | ABS-CBN Sports and Action | 23; Sky Cable Channel 17 | |
| March 31 | Light TV | Light Network | 33; Sky Cable Channel 161 | |
| June 16 | Diva Universal | Diva | Sky Cable Channel 37 | |
| August 15 | Star Sports | Fox Sports 2 | Sky Cable Channel 32 | |
| August 15 | Fox Sports Plus HD | Fox Sports 3 | | |
| August 23 | Solar News Channel | 9TV | 9 Sky Cable Channel 14 | |
| Unknown | SineBox | Cine Mo! | | |

=== Closures ===
| Date | Station | Channel | Sign-on debut | Source |
|---|---|---|---|---|
| January 1 | Velvet | Sky Cable Channel 53 | January 1, 2008 | |
| August 31 | ATC @ IBC | 13 | June 2, 2014 | |
| September 1 | Jack City (analog feed) | 31 | October 20, 2012 | |
| October 15 | BeTV Philippines | SkyCable Channel 35; Destiny Cable Channel 62 | April 2, 2012 | |
| December 31 | Cartoonito Asia | SkyCable Channel 125 | December 1, 2014 | |
| December 31 | MGM Channel Asia | SkyCable Channel 106; Cablelink Channel 50 | March 2006 | |

== Awards ==
- January 10: 12th Gawad Tanglaw Awards, organized by Tagapuring mga Akademik ng Aninong Gumagalaw
- February 13: 1st PUP Mabini Media Awards, organized by Polytechnic University of the Philippines (PUP)
- February 20: 10th USTv Students' Choice Awards, organized by University of Santo Tomas (UST)
- March 6: 5th Northwest Samar State University Students' Choice Award for Radio and television, organized by Northwest Samar State University (NSSU)
- March 12: 1st UmalohokJuan Awards, organized by Lyceum of the Philippines-Manila
- March 17: 13th Kabantugan Awards, organized by Mindanao State University (MSU)
- March 21: 2013 Golden Screen TV Awards, organized by the Entertainment Press Society
- April 8: 1st BPSU Kagitingan Awards for Television, organized by Bataan Peninsula State University (BPSU)
- April 29: 22nd KBP Golden Dove Awards, organized by Kapisanan ng mga Brodkaster ng Pilipinas (KBP)
- May 18: 2014 Box Office Entertainment Awards, organized by Guillermo Mendoza Memorial Scholarship Foundation
- May 22: 34th Rotary Club of Manila Journalism Awards, organized by the Rotary Club of Manila
- May 31: 1st Gawad Duyan Media Awards for Local Television, organized by the Philippine Pediatrics Society
- July 18: 2014 Yahoo Celebrity Awards Philippines, organized by Yahoo! Philippines
- August 1: 2014 COMGUILD Awards, part of the 9th Conference of Journalism and Mass Communication Students of the Philippines, held at the AFP Theater, Camp Aguinaldo, Quezon City
- August 17: 4th EdukCircle Awards, held at the UP-Diliman Campus, Quezon City.
- August 20: 2014 VACC Media Awards, organized by the Volunteers Against Crime and Corruption (VACC), held at the NBI Gym, Taft Avenue, Manila.
- September 16: City of Malabon University College of Arts and Sciences Media Awards
- October 29: 36th Catholic Mass Media Awards, organized by the Catholic Mass Media Awards Foundation, held at the GSIS Financial Center Theater, Pasay City
- November 23: 28th PMPC Star Awards for Television organized by Philippine Movie Press Club (PMPC), held at the Solaire Resort and Casino Grand Ballroom, Paranaque City.

== Winners ==
These are awards held in 2014.

=== Local ===
This list only includes the Golden Screen TV Awards and Star Awards for Television.

| Award ceremony | Best TV Station | Best Drama Series | Best Drama Actor | Best Drama Actress | Best Drama Supporting Actor | Best Drama Supporting Actress | Best Comedy/Gag Show | Best Comedy/Gag Actor | Best Comedy/Gag Actress | Best Comedy/Gag Supporting Actor | Best Comedy/Gag Supporting Actress | Ref. |
|---|---|---|---|---|---|---|---|---|---|---|---|---|
| 5th Golden Screen TV Awards | GMA | My Husband's Lover (Original); Temptation of Wife (Adaptation) | Dennis Trillo; My Husband's Lover | Carla Abellana; My Husband's Lover | Kevin Santos; My Husband's Lover | Angel Aquino Apoy Sa Dagat; Glydel Mercado My Husband's Lover | Pepito Manaloto (Comedy); Bubble Gang (Gag) | Michael V. Pepito Manaloto | Pokwang; Toda Max | Sef Cadayona; Bubble Gang | Nova Villa; Pepito Manaloto | |
| 28th PMPC Star Awards for Television | ABS-CBN | Ikaw Lamang (Primetime); Be Careful with My Heart (Daytime) | Coco Martin; Ikaw Lamang | Kim Chiu; Ikaw Lamang | John Estrada; Ikaw Lamang | KC Concepcion; Ikaw Lamang | Home Sweetie Home (Comedy); Goin' Bulilit (Gag) | Sef Cadayona; Bubble Gang | Ruffa Mae Quinto; Bubble Gang | — | — | |

=== International ===
This list only includes the International Emmys and the Asian Television Awards.

| Award | Category | Nominee | Result | Source |
|---|---|---|---|---|
| 42nd International Emmy Awards | Best Telenovela | My Husband's Lover | Nominated | |
| 42nd International Emmy Awards | Best News | TV Patrol Weekend: Most Powerful Storm | Nominated | |
| 19th Asian Television Awards | Best Direction | Dominic Zapata, My Husband's Lover | Nominated | |
| 19th Asian Television Awards | Best Actor in a Leading Role | Dennis Trillo, My Husband's Lover | Highly Commended | |
| 19th Asian Television Awards | Best Sports Presenter/Commentator | TJ Manotoc, The Score | Nominated | |
| 19th Asian Television Awards | Best Adaptation of an Existing Format | The Voice of the Philippines | Nominated | |
| 19th Asian Television Awards | Best Infotainment Programme | Pinoy Hoops: A National Obsession | Nominated | |
| 19th Asian Television Awards | Best News Programme | News TV Quick Response Team: "Krisis sa Zamboanga" (Zamboanga Crisis) | Nominated | |
| 19th Asian Television Awards | Best News Programme | TV Patrol: Haiyan's Fury | Nominated | |
| 19th Asian Television Awards | Best News Programme | Saksi: Wrath of Typhoon Yolanda | Nominated | |

== Births ==
- January 30 - Chloe Canega, singer
- March 29 - Kzhoebe Nichole Baker, child actress and singer

== Deaths ==
- February 7: Tado Jimenez (born 1974), 39, comedian and host, bus accident.
- February 11: Roy Alvarez (born 1950), 63, actor, cardiac arrest.
- March 10: Roldan Aquino (born 1948), 65, actor, health deterioration after failed recovery from surgery due to stroke.
- April 3: Harry Gasser (born 1938), 76, anchor of RPN NewsWatch, stroke.
- April 30: Ramil Rodriguez (born 1941), 72, actor, lung cancer.
- May 14: Azucena Vera-Perez, (born 1917), 96, owner of Sampaguita Pictures.
- May 30: Alvin Capino, (born 1949), 64, broadcaster of DZRJ 810 AM Radyo Bandido (1979–1995), RJTV-29 (1993–2007) and DWIZ 882 (1995–2014), kidney cancer.
- September 1: Mark Gil, (born 1961), 52, actor, liver cirrhosis.
- September 19: Zenaida Sison, 75, Mother of actress Cherry Pie Picache, stab wound.
- October 2: Myrna "Tiya Pusit" Villanueva, (born 1948), 66, Filipina comedian and actress, aortic aneurysm and kidney failure.
- November 5: Elaine Gamboa Cuneta, (born 1934), 79, former beauty queen, singer, and actress, stomach ulcer.
- November 15: Raffy Marcelo (born 1946), 67, anchor of GMA News, cardiac arrest.

== See also ==
- 2014 in television
