= Chef Roblé & Co. =

2011 American reality TV series

- Jasmine and Roblé Ali
- Genre: Reality
- Starring: Roblé Ali
- Country of origin: United States
- Original language: English
- No. of seasons: 2
- No. of episodes: 16

Production
- Executive producers: Aaron Rothman; Al Szymanski; Jessica Chesler; Kenda Greenwood; Peter Franchella
- Running time: 42 to 44 minutes
- Production company: Red Line Films

Original release
- Network: Bravo
- Release: December 4, 2011 – July 24, 2013

Chef Roblé & Co. is an American reality television series on Bravo that debuted December 4, 2011. The series chronicles the life of celebrity chef Roblé Ali and his attempt to launch a high-end catering company in New York City with his older sister, Jasmine. In April 2013, it was announced that the series had been renewed for a second season, which debuted June 5, 2013.

== Cast ==
=== Main ===
- Roblé Ali - Roblé was born in Poughkeepsie, New York. After graduating from Poughkeepsie High School, Roblé attended the Culinary Institute of America in Hyde Park, New York. After culinary school Roblé moved to New York City, where he developed a reputation as one of the hottest up-and-coming chefs. He worked through the ranks as the youngest sous chef ever at Abigail Kirsch, an elite New York catering company, and alongside Chris Santos as Chef de cuisine of Restaurant Mojo and on the opening of Stanton Social. Since then, he has cooked for the likes of R&B diva Faith Evans, Rachel Dratch, music mogul Russell Simmons, and Michael Jackson.
- Jasmine Ali

=== Supporting ===
- Adam C. Banks
- Artie Thompson
- Che 'Gravy' Gaines
- D'Andre Brunson
- Dan Cathcart (season 2)
- Jeorge Robbins (season 2)
- Kikuyo 'Kiku' Polk
- Rob McCue (season 2)
- Shawn Knights

== Episodes ==
=== Series overview ===
| Season | Episodes | Originally released | |
| Season | Episodes | First released | Last released |
|---|---|---|---|
| 1 | 8 | December 4, 2011 | January 22, 2012 |
| 2 | 8 | June 5, 2013 | July 24, 2013 |

=== Season 1 (2011–2012) ===
| No. overall | No. in season | Title | Original release date | U.S. viewers (millions) |
|---|---|---|---|---|
| 1 | 1 | "Upper East Side Carnival Party" | December 4, 2011 | 1.29 |
| 2 | 2 | "Kandi Burruss Gets Intimate" | December 11, 2011 | 1.59 |
| 3 | 3 | "The Vanessa Williams House Party" | December 12, 2011 | 0.94 |
| 4 | 4 | "Big Money Birthday Bashes" | December 18, 2011 | 1.41 |
| 5 | 5 | "The Crazy Hamptons Blowout" | January 1, 2012 | 0.50 |
| 6 | 6 | "Dinner Party Smackdown" | January 8, 2012 | 1.24 |
| 7 | 7 | "If You Can't Stand the Heat..." | January 15, 2012 | 1.16 |
| 8 | 8 | "Two Grooms & Rachel Dratch" | January 22, 2012 | 1.08 |

=== Season 2 (2013) ===
| No. overall | No. in season | Title | Original release date | U.S. viewers (millions) |
|---|---|---|---|---|
| 9 | 1 | "Georgia Peach in the Big Apple" | June 5, 2013 | 0.87 |
| 10 | 2 | "Too Hot to Handle" | June 12, 2013 | 0.74 |
| 11 | 3 | "Blood, Sweat, and Polo" | June 19, 2013 | 0.65 |
| 12 | 4 | "Fashionable Foodies" | June 26, 2013 | 0.65 |
| 13 | 5 | "Hoop Dreams Dinner" | July 3, 2013 | 0.67 |
| 14 | 6 | "Food of the Future" | July 10, 2013 | 0.68 |
| 15 | 7 | "Deuces Wild" | July 17, 2013 | 0.80 |
| 16 | 8 | "Chrissy's Crabtacular" | July 24, 2013 | N/A |
