= 2013 in Philippine television =

The following is a list of events affecting Philippine television in 2013. Events listed include television show debuts, finales, cancellations, birthdays, anniversaries, and channel launches, closures and rebrandings, as well as information about controversies and carriage disputes.

== Events ==
=== January ===
- January 19: Despabiladeras Family was hailed as Eat Bulaga!'s Pamilyang Pinoy Henyo 2012-2013 Grand Champion with a total of 13 points.
- January 23: GMA Cagayan de Oro was finally launched as the 7th originating station of Kapuso Network, which covers Northern Mindanao and Caraga as well as parts of Zamboanga Peninsula. On February 5, it moved form Channel 12 to Channel 35 with the launched of its flagship local newscast Testigo Northern Mindanao.

=== February ===
- February 9 – JR Royol wins MasterChef Pinoy Edition.

=== March ===
- March 21 – Kris Aquino appeared in a 30-minute interview with TV Patrol to announce her resignation from all her ABS-CBN shows to spend time with her youngest son. She also revealed that James Yap made sexual advances on her inside her room, which she refused. She said Yap threatened her in the presence of Bimby, who was traumatized of the said incident. Aquino also filed a temporary protection order on March 20, 2013. In the petition, Kris asked the court to order Yap to stay away from her, her 5-year-old son Bimby and any household member, keep a distance of at least 100 meters, and to stay away from her residence, school, place of employment or any place frequented by her and her son.

=== April ===
- April 6 – Vocus Incorporated was hailed as Eat Bulaga's Pinoy Henyo Inc. Grand Champion.
- April 11 – TV5's parent company MediaQuest Holdings has announced that it will not renew its blocktime agreement with the government network Intercontinental Broadcasting Corporation under the AKTV primetime sports block, when AKTV ceased airing on May 31.
- April 13 – Isabel Granada and Kapamilya was hailed as Bida Kapamilya Celebrity Round Grand Champion on It's Showtime.
- April 14 – Ariella Arida, Bea Rose Santiago, Joanna Cindy Miranda, Mutya Johanna Datul and Pia Wurtzbach were crowned as the new Binibining Pilipinas winners. Arida was crowned by Miss Universe 2012 1st runner-up Janine Tugonon as the new Miss Universe–Philippines 2013. Santiago was crowned as the new Binibining Pilipinas–International 2013 by the outgoing titleholder Nicole Schmitz. Miranda as the new Binibining Pilipinas–Tourism 2013 crowned by Katrina Jayne Dimaranan. Datul was crowned as the new Binibining Pilipinas–Supranational 2013 by Miss Supranational 2012 3rd runner-up Elaine Kay Moll. Wurtzbach ended as the Binibining Pilipinas 2013 1st runner-up.

=== May ===
- May 11 – Agravante Family from Brgy. Pagsawitan, Sta. Cruz, Laguna hailed as Bida Kapamilya Round 2 grand champion on It's Showtime.
- May 13–14 – All Philippine TV networks will have for a special coverage of the 2013 mid-term elections.
- May 18 – Francisco P. Felix Memorial National High School was hailed as Eat Bulaga!'s Pinoy Henyo High 2012-2013 Sayawan Grand Winner.
- May 25 – Muntinlupa National High School was hailed as Eat Bulaga!'s Pinoy Henyo High 2012-2013 Pautakan Grand Winner.
- May 31 – After two years of broadcast, AKTV on IBC 13 ceased operations on Friday evening.

=== June ===
- June 1 – Christopher de Leon's look-alike (Jonathan Garcia from Quezon City) wins as Ultimate Kalokalike on It's Showtime.
- June 8
  - 13-year-old singer Roel Manlangit wins the fourth season of Pilipinas Got Talent.
  - Boy Abunda wins the 1.186.3 million pesos of Kapamilya, Deal or No Deal.
- June 9 – Goin' Bulilit introduces the nine new cast members such as JB Agustin, Lance Lucido, CX Navarro, Aldred Nasayao, Jillian Aguila, Aaliyah Belmoro, Allyson McBride, Ashley Sarmiento and Kazumi Porquez.
- June 10 – The controversial drama My Husband's Lover began airing on GMA Network which tackles homosexual relationships between men.
- June 22 – Super Crew was hailed as Bida Kids Grand Champion on It's Showtime.

=== August ===
- August 3 – Video snippets of Chito Miranda having sexual intercourse with Neri Naig, and two other women in three different occasions appeared in YouTube. The video snippets with the other two women were taken down the same day, but the one with Naig became a viral hit that was shared in different blogs and social media sites. On his Twitter account, Miranda said his room was recently robbed. Among those stolen was his hard disk drive, where photo and video files were stored. On Parokya ni Edgar's Facebook page and on Miranda's Instagram page, Miranda expressed his sadness on the leaking of the private video. He also asked for forgiveness from both his and Naig's families. A second more graphic clip, which is 11 minutes and 20 seconds long, different from the first video that spread in August was uploaded Monday afternoon on a Facebook page.
- August 18 – Former actress Megan Young crowned as Miss World Philippines 2013 at the Solaire Resort & Casino in Parañaque.
- August 19 – Spyro Marco was hailed as the Ultimate Talentado in Talentadong Pinoy Worldwide, the Battle Royale of which were held at Cuneta Astrodome.
- August 31 – Genelyn Sandaga wins the 1.123 million pesos of Kapamilya, Deal or No Deal.

=== September ===
- September 2 – An alleged sex scandal of Wally Bayola and EB Babes dancer, Yosh Rivera, went viral in social media sites. The video, in which both of them are seen engaging in sexual intercourse, was uploaded onto YouTube that night. The video was immediately removed from the site but it was already circulated to other sites such as Facebook. After the scandal became known, the two of them have not appeared on Eat Bulaga! since. It was reported that Bayola will temporarily not be appearing on Eat Bulaga!, as stated by his manager, Malou Choa Fagar who said the comedian "will lie low from the program".
- September 7 – Mutya Johanna Datul was crowned Miss Supranational 2013 and is the first Asian and first Filipina to win the title.
- September 14
  - TV5 marks the launching of the new programming blocks Weekend Do It Better and Everyday All The Way.
  - Rizal Underground hailed as Bida Kabarkada Grand Champion on It's Showtime.
- September 28
  - Miss Philippines Megan Young was crowned Miss World 2013 and is the first Filipina to win the title.
  - Nicki Minaj's look-alike (Jennifer Katayong from Pasay) wins as Ultimate Kalokalike Face 2 on It's Showtime.
- September 29:
  - A fire hits the basement of GMA Network Center in Quezon City, the headquarters of GMA Network, one of the country's largest TV network. Although there were no injuries, it caused technological difficulties to the transmissions of both GMA and GMA News TV.
  - Mitoy Yonting wins the first season of The Voice of the Philippines.

=== October ===
- October 5–6 – ABS-CBN marks its 60th anniversary of the Philippine Television with the Grand Kapamilya Weekend held at the Quezon City Memorial Circle, Smart Araneta Coliseum and Marikina Sports Complex.
- October 12 – The De La Salle University Green Archers clinched the UAAP Season 76 men's basketball title after defeating the University of Santo Tomas Growling Tigers 2–1 in winner take-all game 3 of the best-of-three finals series held at the SM Mall of Asia Arena in Bay City, Pasay. This was their 8th basketball championship title since they last won in 2007.
- October 19 – Filipino-Chinese Francis Ryan Lim was hailed as Pinoy Halo-Halo Grand Winner on It's Showtime.
- October 20 – Eduardo Gaeilo Pajinag, Jr. wins the top prize of 2 Million pesos of Who Wants to Be a Millionaire?.
- October 26 – Team Teddy, Karylle and Jugs hailed as the 4th anniversary champion on It's Showtime.
- October 31 – OMNI Digital Media Ventures (an affiliate of Solar Entertainment Corporation) launched a video-on-demand streaming service to access Hollywood blockbusters and episodes of TV series, Blink.

=== November ===
- November 6 – ABS-CBN launches the Christmas song Magkasama Tayo sa Kwento ng Pasko, after the news program TV Patrol.
- November 9 – Miss Philippines Ariella Arida won third runner-up in the Miss Universe 2013 in Moscow Oblast, Russia.
- November 16 – HMN hailed as Jambunganga Grand Winner on It's Showtime.
- November 30 – ETC returned to Southern Broadcasting Network after 2 years broadcast on Radio Philippines Network.

=== December ===
- December 1 – Solar News Channel transferred to RPN-9 after ETC returned to SBN-21.
- December 2 – UNTV introduces drone technology, the first in Philippine television.
- December 17 – Miss Philippines Bea Rose Santiago won Miss International 2013 held in Tokyo, Japan.
- December 23 – The network began broadcasting from its new headquarters, the 6,000-sqm TV5 Media Center located in Reliance, Mandaluyong.

== Debuts ==
Date	Show
January 2	Gintama season 1 on Hero
January 3	Jigoku Shoujo on Hero
January 3	Shiki on Hero
January 7	Rooftop Prince on ABS-CBN 2
January 7	Balitaan on PTV 4
January 7	Jeepney Jackpot: Pera o Para! on TV5
January 7	Kidlat on TV5
January 7	Piskante ng Bayan on Net 25
January 7	Sa Ganang Mamamayan on Net 25
January 8	Moonlight Serenade on DZMM TeleRadyo
January 9	One Outs on Hero
January 12	Lost season 5 on Fox Channel Philippines
January 12	Railgun on Hero
January 13	Lokomoko: La-Bus on TV5
January 13	Yu-Gi-Oh! GX on Hero
January 14	Good Morning Boss on PTV 4
January 14	You're Still the One on ABS-CBN 2
January 14	Minute to Win It on ABS-CBN 2
January 14	Indio on GMA 7
January 14	The Alabang Housewives on TV5
January 14	You Are My Destiny on TV5
January 15	Captain Tsubasa (2001 version) on Hero
January 19	Extra on Blink Cinema
January 19	Entertainment Tonight on Blink Cinema
January 19	The Insider on Blink Cinema
January 21	Kailangan Ko'y Ikaw on ABS-CBN 2
January 21	May Isang Pangarap on ABS-CBN 2
January 21	Forever on GMA 7
January 21	The Tim Yap Show on GMA 7
January 21	The Carrie Diaries on ETC
January 23	Kamisama Dolls on Hero
January 23	RahXephon on Hero
January 23	Viewtiful Joe on Hero
January 26	Human Planet on GMA News TV 11
January 26	Wowowillie on TV5
January 26	Aksyon Weekend on TV5/AksyonTV 41
January 26	Rescue5 on TV5
January 26	The Following on Jack City
January 27	Born Impact: Born to Be Wild Weekend Edition on GMA 7
January 27	Game 'N Go All-Stars on TV5
January 27	Istorifik: Pidol's Kwentong Fantastik on TV5
January 27	Alphas (season 1) on Jack TV
January 28	Blue Dragon (season 2) on ABS-CBN 2
January 28	Kahit Konting Pagtingin on ABS-CBN 2
January 28	Solar News Cebuano on Solar News Channel
January 29	Friends season 4 on Fox Channel Philippines
January 29	Deltora Quest on Hero
February 1	Family Game Night (season 3) on GMA 7
February 1	Biyahe ni Drew on GMA News TV 11
February 1	Code Geass on Hero
February 1	Lifegiver on Light TV 33
February 2	Hayop sa Galing on TV5
February 2	Slayers Evolution-R on Hero
February 3	Para sa 'Yo ang Laban Na Ito on GMA 7
February 3	Balwarte on TV5
February 4	CNN Konek on TV5
February 4	Juan dela Cruz on ABS-CBN 2
February 4	Dollhouse season 1 on Fox Channel Philippines
February 4	Lost season 5 on Fox Channel Philippines
February 4	Devil May Cry: The Animated Series on Hero
February 5	Testigo Northern Mindanao on GMA Cagayan de Oro
February 5	Sailor Moon S on Hero
February 6	Mobile Suit Gundam 00 on TV5
February 6	Lie to Me on Fox Channel Philippines
February 7	The Unit season 1 on Fox Channel Philippines
February 9	Wagas on GMA News TV 11
February 9	Kanta Pilipinas on TV5
February 10	Gakuen Utopia Manabi Straight! on Hero
February 10	Hetalia: Axis Powers on Hero
February 10	Ran: The Samurai Girl on Hero
February 11	Never Say Goodbye on TV5
February 11	The Greatest Love on GMA 7
February 11	Bukod Kang Pinagpala on GMA 7
February 11	Ohlala Couple on ABS-CBN 2
February 11	Apoy sa Dagat on ABS-CBN 2
February 11	Mirmo de Pon! on Hero
February 11	Gintama season 2 on Hero
February 13	Initial D on Hero
February 14	Survivor: Caramoan on Jack TV
February 15	Mankind: The Story of All of Us on GMA News TV 11
February 16	Trigun on Hero
February 20	Skull Man on Hero
February 21	Kandidato 2013: Senador on GMA 7
February 21	Best Ink on Jack TV
February 23	Kapuso Movie Night on GMA 7
February 25	Glory Jane on ABS-CBN 2
February 25	Unforgettable on GMA 7
February 25	Banana Nite on ABS-CBN 2
February 28	Innocent Venus on Hero
March 1	Friends season 5 on Fox Channel Philippines
March 1	Martin Late at Night on ABS-CBN 2
March 4	Big on GMA 7
March 4	Garantisadong Balita on DZMM TeleRadyo
March 5	Digimon Adventure on Hero
March 9	Vampire ang Daddy Ko on GMA 7
March 9	Sine Ko 5ingko on TV5
March 9	The Cleveland Show season 4 on Jack TV
March 10	Bayan Ko on GMA News TV 11
March 11	Tokyo Magnitude 8.0 on Hero
March 11	Grimm season 2 on Jack TV
March 12	Revolution (season 1) on Jack TV
March 12	30 Rock season 7 on Jack TV
March 12	Raising Hope season 3 on Jack TV
March 12	Parks and Recreation season 4 on Jack TV
March 12	The Office season 9 on Jack TV
March 13	Two and a Half Men season 10 on Jack TV
March 17	Chicago Fire on Jack City
March 17	Jackie Chan's Fantasia on Hero
March 18	Little Champ on ABS-CBN 2
March 18	Pororo the Little Penguin on GMA 7
March 18	Mundo Mo'y Akin on GMA 7
March 18	Arjuna on Hero
March 18	Tide-Line Blue on Hero
March 23	Alisto on GMA 7
March 24	Earthflight on GMA News TV 11
March 24	Golden Boy on Jack City
March 28	Hi-5 (series 13) on Hero
March 30	Report Kay Boss on PTV 4 and IBC 13
March 30	Jigoku Shoujo (rerun) on Hero
March 31	Yu-Gi-Oh! 5D's on Hero
April 1	A Woman of Steel on Telenovela Channel
April 1	Rafaela on Telenovela Channel
April 2	Mobile Suit Gundam 00 on Hero
April 3	Friends season 6 on Fox Channel Philippines
April 4	Ceres, Celestial Legend on Hero
April 5	Guys with Kids on 2nd Avenue
April 6	Boracay Bodies on TV5
April 7	The Super Hero Squad Show on ABS-CBN 2
April 7	Kyoshiro and the Eternal Sky on Hero
April 8	Kuroko's Basketball season 1 on ABS-CBN 2
April 8	Naruto: Shippuden season 5 on ABS-CBN 2
April 8	Yakitate!! Japan on ABS-CBN 2
April 8	Dugong Buhay on ABS-CBN 2
April 8	Karinderya Wars on TV5
April 8	Unexpected You on GMA 7
April 8	The Ryzza Mae Show on GMA 7
April 8	Love & Lies on GMA 7
April 10	Michiko & Hatchin on Hero
April 10	Over Drive on Hero
April 12	Kyo Kara Maoh! on Hero
April 13	Toriko on GMA 7
April 13	The Americas on Jack City
April 13	Naruto: Shippuden season 4 on Hero
April 15	2013 Shakey's V-League 1st Conference on GMA News TV 11
April 15	To the Beautiful You on ABS-CBN 2
April 15	Kakambal ni Eliana on GMA 7
April 15	666 Park Avenue on Jack TV
April 21	Kapamilya Konek on DZMM TeleRadyo
April 22	Home Sweet Home on GMA 7
April 22	Missing You on ABS-CBN 2
April 23	Tiger & Bunny on Hero
April 27	Brickleberry on Jack TV
April 29	WansapanaSummer on ABS-CBN 2
April 29	Queen and I on GMA 7
May 4	Kapuso Movie Night on GMA 7
May 5	GMA Blockbusters on GMA 7
May 6	I Do, I Do on GMA 7
May 6	Cassandra: Warrior Angel on TV5
May 6	Friends season 7 on Fox Channel Philippines
May 8	The Legend of the Legendary Heroes on Hero
May 10	Vampire Knight on Hero
May 11	Tropang Kulit on TV5
May 11	Arjuna (rerun) on Hero
May 11	Gintama season 3 on Hero
May 12	Everyday Easy on GMA 7
May 12	.hack//Legend of the Twilight on Hero
May 12	Tide-Line Blue on Hero
May 19	Great Migrations on GMA News TV 11
May 20	My Little Juan on ABS-CBN 2
May 20	Sine Ko 5ingko Premiere on TV5
May 22	Digimon Xros Wars on Hero
May 23	Yakitate!! Japan on Hero
May 24	Gintama season 5 on Hero
May 27	A Promise of a Thousand Days on ABS-CBN 2
May 27	Annaliza on ABS-CBN 2
June 1	Superbook on GMA 7
June 1	Sine Ko 5ingko Indie ‘To! on TV5
June 3	Mga Basang Sisiw on GMA 7
June 3	Anna Karenina on GMA 7
June 5	Major (season 3) on Hero
June 6	Friends season 8 on Fox Channel Philippines
June 7	Eyeshield 21 on Hero
June 8	I-Shine Talent Camp (season 2) on ABS-CBN 2
June 10	Maghihintay Pa Rin on GMA 7
June 10	My Husband's Lover on GMA 7
June 10	The Catalina on ETC
June 11	The Next Big Thing: NY on ETC
June 11	Project Accessory on ETC
June 12	Claymore on Hero
June 13	Dallias on Jack City
June 14	Daily Lives of High School Boys on Hero
June 15	One Day, Isang Araw on GMA 7
June 15	The Voice of the Philippines season 1 on ABS-CBN 2
June 16	Sunday All Stars on GMA 7
June 16	Hitman Reborn! season 1 on Hero
June 17	Likeable or Not on TV5
June 17	Huwag Ka Lang Mawawala on ABS-CBN 2
June 19	Fashion Hunters on ETC
June 21	Gallery Girls on ETC
June 22	Sailor Moon season 1 on Hero
June 23	Kwentong Kusina, Kwentong Buhay on ABS-CBN 2
June 24	Love Rain on ABS-CBN 2
June 24	With a Smile on GMA 7
June 24	Absolute Boyfriend on ABS-CBN 2
June 24	Padam Padam... The Music of Their Hearts on GMA 7
June 29	The Familiar of Zero on Hero
July 1	My Daughter Seo-young on GMA 7
July 1	Undercover on TV5
July 1	Misibis Bay on TV5
July 2	Naruto: Shippuden season 4 on Hero
July 2	Partners on Jack TV
July 2	It's Always Sunny in Philadelphia season 8 on Jack TV
July 4	Working!! on Hero
July 6	Digimon Adventure 02 on Hero
July 6	Death Note on Hero
July 7	Wild Case Files on GMA News TV 11
July 8	Muling Buksan ang Puso on ABS-CBN 2
July 8	That Winter, the Wind Blows on ABS-CBN 2
July 9	Beyond Politics with Lynda Jumilla on ANC
July 9	Friends season 9 on Fox Channel Philippines
July 9	Wilfred season 3 on Jack TV
July 9	Legit (season 3) on Jack TV
July 15	Miss Advised on ETC
July 16	Graceland on Jack City
July 16	Mutya ng Masa on ABS-CBN 2
July 16	Louie season 3 on Jack TV
July 17	My Puhunan on ABS-CBN 2
July 17	Blue Dragon (season 2) on Hero
July 18	TNT: Tapatan ni Tunying on ABS-CBN 2
July 18	RahXephon on Hero
July 20	The Jollitown Kids Show on GMA 7
July 22	Sailor Moon R on ABS-CBN 2
July 22	Yu-Gi-Oh! Zexal season 1 on ABS-CBN 2
July 22	Binoy Henyo on GMA 7
July 22	The Innocent Man on GMA 7
July 22	Triumph of Love on Telenovela Channel
July 23	Galing Pook on ANC
July 23	Toaru Majutsu no Index on Hero
July 25	Initial D (Fourth Stage) on Hero
July 27	Angry Birds Toons on GMA 7
July 29	UNTV Cup on UNTV 37
July 31	Skull Man on Hero
August 2	Opposing Views on Solar News Channel
August 4	Gargoyle of Yoshinaga Family on Hero
August 5	Aquarion Evol on Hero
August 9	Friends season 10 on Fox Channel Philippines
August 9	Hanasaku Iroha on Hero
August 11	Titser on GMA News TV 11
August 12	Pondahan on UNTV 37
August 18	Remember When on DZMM TeleRadyo
August 18	2013 Shakey's V-League Open Conference on GMA News TV 11
August 19	The Love Story of Kang Chi on ABS-CBN 2
August 19	Mobile Suit Gundam AGE on Hero
August 23	Gatch Bell! on Hero
August 24	OMJ! on DZMM TeleRadyo
August 26	Anak Ko 'Yan! on GMA 7
August 26	Wish Upon a Star on ABS-CBN 2
August 26	Pyra: Babaeng Apoy on GMA 7
August 26	Got to Believe on ABS-CBN 2
August 26	Agila Balita on Net 25
August 28	Absolutely Lovely Children on Hero
August 28	Giant Killing on Hero
August 31	#Hashtag on INC TV 49
September 1	FPJ: Hari ng Pinoy Cinema on Cinema One
September 2	Bukas na Lang Kita Mamahalin on ABS-CBN 2
September 7	Hetalia: Axis Powers on Hero
September 7	Teka Muna on DZMM TeleRadyo
September 8	FPJ: Da King on ABS-CBN on ABS-CBN 2
September 9	Akin Pa Rin ang Bukas on GMA 7
September 9	Major (season 4) on Hero
September 10	Fate/Zero on Hero
September 10	GA Geijutsuka Art Design Class on Hero
September 14	Showbiz Police: Intriga Under Arrest on TV5
September 14	Tropa Mo Ko Unli on TV5
September 14	Killer Karaoke on TV5
September 14	What's Up Doods? on TV5
September 14	Jigoku Shoujo (rerun) on Hero
September 14	Sailor Moon R on Hero
September 15	The Mega and The Songwriter on TV5
September 16	Hetalia: Axis Powers on Hero
September 17	Naruto: Shippuden season 5 on Hero
September 17	Mission-E on Hero
September 18	Kasangga Mo ang Langit on PTV 4
September 18	Biyaheng Langit on PTV 4
September 19	Survivor: Blood vs. Water on Jack TV
September 21	Bingit on GMA 7
September 21	Kamisama Dolls on Hero
September 21	Needless on Hero
September 22	Dormitoryo on GMA 7
September 23	Lola on GMA 7
September 23	Prinsesa ng Buhay Ko on GMA 7
September 23	Kahit Nasaan Ka Man on GMA 7
September 23	Love Hotline on GMA News TV 11
September 23	House season 3 on Fox Channel Philippines
September 23	Moonlight on Fox Channel Philippines
September 23	The 4400 (season 4) on Fox Channel Philippines
September 23	Mr. Bean on ABS-CBN 2
September 23	Jackie Chan's Fantasia on ABS-CBN 2
September 24	The Unit season 2 on Fox Channel Philippines
September 26	White Collar (season 3) on Fox Channel Philippines
September 26	Without a Trace season 3 on Fox Channel Philippines
September 27	Ghost Whisperer season 3 on Fox Channel Philippines
September 27	Cold Case season 2 on Fox Channel Philippines
September 27	Numbers season 4 on Fox Channel Philippines
September 27	Major (season 5) on Hero
September 30	Magkano Ba ang Pag-ibig? on GMA 7
September 30	Galema: Anak ni Zuma on ABS-CBN 2
September 30	News Team 13 on IBC 13
October 1	The Crazy Ones on 2nd Avenue
October 1	The Queen Latifah Show on 2nd Avenue
October 1	Railgun on Hero
October 2	Smallville season 5 on Fox Channel Philippines
October 6	ThunderCats on GMA 7
October 6	Shigofumi: Letters from the Departed on Hero
October 6	Iron Man on ABS-CBN 2
October 7	Maria Mercedes on ABS-CBN 2
October 7	DZRH Network News on DZRH News Television
October 8	The Originals on ETC
October 8	Super Fun Night on ETC
October 8	24 season 6 on Fox Channel Philippines
October 8	Buffy the Vampire Slayer season 5 on Fox Channel Philippines
October 8	Angel season 2 on Fox Channel Philippines
October 9	Web Therapy on 2nd Avenue
October 9	Veronica Mars season 1 on Fox Channel Philippines
October 9	Lie to Me (season 2) on Fox Channel Philippines
October 10	Chuck season 5 on Fox Channel Philippines
October 10	One Tree Hill season 3 on Fox Channel Philippines
October 10	Hetalia World Series on Hero
October 12	I Dare You (season 2) on ABS-CBN 2
October 13	Yu-Gi-Oh! GX season 3 on Hero
October 14	Face the People on TV5
October 14	Madam Chairman on TV5
October 14	Let's Ask Pilipinas on TV5
October 14	Genesis on GMA 7
October 14	Demolition Job on TV5
October 14	O Shopping on ABS-CBN 2
October 14	The Office on Fox Channel Philippines
October 14	Monday Night Blockbusters on TV5
October 15	Numero on TV5
October 15	Tuesday Christmas Countdown on TV5
October 16	Dayo on TV5
October 17	For Love or Money on TV5
October 17	Positive on TV5
October 17	History with Lourd on TV5
October 18	Astig!: Sa Sports Walang Tsamba! on TV5
October 18	Animazing Tales on Hero
October 18	Hitman Reborn! season 2 on Hero
October 19	Sabado Specials: Shake, Rattle & Roll on ABS-CBN 2
October 19	Bet on Your Baby on ABS-CBN 2
October 19	Katipunan on GMA 7
October 19	Juan Direction on TV5
October 19	Sabado Sinerama on TV5
October 20	Buzz ng Bayan on ABS-CBN 2
October 20	Sunday Sineplex on TV5
October 22	The Office season 2 on Fox Channel Philippines
October 24	Ravenswood on ETC
October 25	The Familiar of Zero (season 4) on Hero
October 25	Yu-Gi-Oh! Zexal on Hero
October 28	Fabulous Boys on GMA 7
October 28	Honesto on ABS-CBN 2
October 28	Project Runway All Stars on ETC
October 29	Major (season 6) on Hero
October 29	Shiki on Hero
October 30	Wednesday Night Thriller on TV5
November 1	Friday Night Action on TV5
November 3	Ran: The Samurai Girl (rerun) on Hero
November 3	Tokyo Magnitude 8.0 on Hero
November 4	Crazy Love on ABS-CBN 2
November 4	Villa Quintana on GMA 7
November 4	A 100-Year Legacy on GMA 7
November 4	Bones season 7 on Fox Channel Philippines
November 11	UNTV Community Prayer on UNTV 37
November 16	The Singing Bee on ABS-CBN 2
November 16	Killer Karaoke: Pinoy Naman on TV5
November 16	Sabado Horror Night on GMA 7
November 17	Biyaheng Retro: Reunion sa Nakaraan on Jeepney TV
November 18	Sarap with Family on GMA News TV 11
November 18	Adarna on GMA 7
November 18	When a Man Falls in Love on ABS-CBN 2
November 18	Gakuen Utopia Manabi Straight! (rerun) on Hero
November 18	Kuroko's Basketball season 1 on Hero
November 18	Kyōran Kazoku Nikki on Hero
November 18	One Outs (rerun) on Hero
November 18	Shiki on Hero
November 21	The Office season 3 on Fox Channel Philippines
November 21	Gargantia on the Verdurous Planet on Hero
November 22	Shigofumi: Letters from the Departed on Hero
November 23	Out of Control on GMA 7
November 23	Picture! Picture! on GMA 7
November 23	Spinnation on TV5
November 24	Sailor Moon S on Hero
November 24	Red Alert sa DZMM on DZMM TeleRadyo
November 26	Arjuna (rerun) on Hero
December 2	GMA Blockbusters: Afternoon Edition on GMA 7
December 15	X-Men on ABS-CBN 2
December 16	Noli Me Tangere on IBC 13
December 16	Innocent Venus on Hero
December 16	Kobato. on Hero
December 23	Ultraman Mebius on ABS-CBN 2
December 23	Dōmo on ABS-CBN 2
December 24	The Office season 4 on Fox Channel Philippines
December 25	Aquarion Evol on Hero
December 25	Heroman on Hero
December 25	Viewtiful Joe on Hero
December 29	Blade on ABS-CBN 2
December 29	True Horror Stories on GMA 7
December 30	Kapuso Primetime Cinema on GMA 7

=== Unknown dates ===
- July: The Snow Queen on Net 25

=== Unknown ===
- Something to Chew On on Solar News Channel
- Ben 10 Ultimate Alien on TV5
- Dayo on AksyonTV 41
- Gargoyles on TV5
- Regular Show on TV5
- Sym-Bionic Titan on TV5
- The Amazing World of Gumball on TV5
- The Marvelous Misadventures of Flapjack on TV5
- Power Rangers Super Samurai on ABS-CBN 2
- ETC Flix on ETC
- BRM BRM TV: Biyahe Rider Motorsiklo on PTV 4
- Biyahero on PTV 4
- Cine Movie Trailers on PTV 4
- Fitness and Health, Good Life, Good Health, True Health, Health and Fitness on PTV 4
- Gabay at Aksyon on PTV 4
- Kakaibang Lunas on PTV 4
- Kasama Natin ang Diyos on PTV 4
- Kris10 on PTV 4
- Mystica's Mystic Road to Success on PTV 4
- Sa Inyong Mga Kamay on PTV 4
- Young Minds Inspired on PTV 4
- Everyday Easy on GMA News TV 11
- Sarap with Family on GMA News TV 11
- Ugaling Wagi on GMA News TV 11
- City Hunter on Studio 23
- Hardcore Brothers Easy Ride on Studio 23
- I Am Legend on Studio 23
- Legend of the Seeker on Studio 23
- Marry Me, Mary! on Studio 23
- Missing on Studio 23
- My Girlfriend Is a Gumiho on Studio 23
- Revenge on Studio 23
- The River on Studio 23

== Returning or renamed programs ==
Show	Last Aired	Retitled	Channel	Return Date
American Idol	2012	Same (season 12)	ETC	January 17
Aksyon Weekend	2010	Same	TV5	January 26
Wil Time Bigtime	2013	Wowowillie	TV5	January 26
Philippine Basketball Association	2013 (season 38: "Philippine Cup")	Same (season 38: "Commissioner's Cup")	IBC	February 8
Del Monte Kitchenomics	2012	Same	GMA	February 13
Survivor	2012 (GMA News TV; season 25: "Philippines")	Same (season 26: "Caramoan")	Jack TV	February 13
Dos Por Dos (morning edition)	2013	Garantisadong Balita	DZMM TeleRadyo	March 4
Project Runway	2013	Same (season 9)	ETC	March 4
Shakey's V-League	2012 (IBC; season 9: "open Conference")	Same (season 10: "1st conference")	GMA News TV	April 7
Anna Liza	1985 (GMA)	Annaliza	ABS-CBN	May 27
Pretty Little Liars	2013	Same (season 4)	ETC	June 14
National Collegiate Athletic Association	2012 (IBC)	Same (season 89)	AksyonTV	June 22
University Athletic Association of the Philippines	2012	Same (season 76)	Studio 23	June 29
Project Runway	2013	Same (season 10)	ETC	July 1
Jollitown	2012 (ABS-CBN)	The Jollibee Kids Show	GMA	July 20
Philippine Basketball Association	2013 (season 38: "Commissioner's Cup")	Same (season 38: "Governors' Cup")	AksyonTV / IBC	August 14
Shakey's V-League	2013 (season 10: "1st conference")	Same (season 10: "Open Conference")	GMA News TV	August 18
Etcetera	2011	Same	ETC	September 8
The Ellen DeGeneres Show	2013	Same (season 11)	2nd Avenue on RJTV	September 10
The X Factor	2012	Same (season 3)	Studio 23	September 12
I Am Meg	2012	Same	ETC	September 14
Wow Mali	2012	Wow Mali Pa Rin!	TV5	September 15
Pinoy Explorer	2013	Same	TV5	September 15
Who Wants to be a Millionaire?	2012	Same	TV5	September 15
Bones	2013	Same (season 9)	Jack City	September 18
Survivor	2013 (season 26: "Caramoan")	Same (season 27: "Blood vs Water")	Jack TV	September 19
New Girl	2013	Same (season 3)	ETC	September 25
News Team 13	2013	News Team 13 2.0	IBC	September 30
The Vampire Diaries	2013	Same (season 5)	ETC	October 8
Beauty & the Beast	2013	Same (season 2)	ETC	October 10
I Dare You	2011	Same (season 2)	ABS-CBN	October 12
Misibis Bay	2013	Misibis Bay: Return to Paradise	TV5	October 14
Astig	2013	Astig: Sa Sports Walang Tsamba!	TV5	October 18
The Carrie Diaries	2013	Same (season 2)	ETC	October 28
National Basketball Association	2013	Same (2013–14 season)	ABS-CBN / Studio 23 / Basketball TV / NBA Premium TV	October 30
Villa Quintana	1997	Same (2013)	GMA	November 4
Philippine Basketball Association	2013 (IBC / AksyonTV; season 38: "Governors' Cup")	Same (season 39: "Philippine Cup")	TV5 / AksyonTV	November 17
Mega Fashion Crew	2012	Mega Fashion Crew: Reloaded	ETC	November 25

== Programs transferring networks ==
Date	Show	No. of seasons	Moved from	Moved to
January 19	Entertainment Tonight	—N/a	ETC	Blink Cinema (now My Movie Channel)
February 14	Survivor	26	GMA News TV	Jack TV
April 7	Shakey's V-League	10	AKTV on IBC (now defunct)	GMA News TV
May 27	Annaliza	—N/a	GMA (as the original 1980 TV series)	ABS-CBN (as a remake)
June 22	National Collegiate Athletic Association	89	AKTV on IBC (now defunct)	TV5 / AksyonTV
July 20	Jollitown	—N/a	ABS-CBN	GMA
September 18	Kasangga Mo ang Langit	—N/a	IBC	PTV
September 18	Biyaheng Langit	—N/a	IBC	PTV
October 11	Philippine Basketball Association	39	IBC	TV5 / AksyonTV
Unknown	Cinderella	—N/a	ABS-CBN	GMA
Unknown	Ben 10: Ultimate Alien	—N/a	Solar TV (now Solar News Channel)	TV5
Unknown	Thomas and Friends	—N/a	TV5	Studio 23

== Finales ==
- January 1: Logan Live (DZMM TeleRadyo)
- January 2
  - Michiko to Hatchin (Hero)
  - Trigun (Hero)
- January 4:
  - Ms. M Confidential (DZMM TeleRadyo)
  - Metro One (PTV 4)
  - Cielo de Angelina (GMA 7)
  - Animazing Tales (ABS-CBN 2)
  - Secret Love: Sungkyunkwan Scandal (ABS-CBN 2)
  - Sharon: Kasama Mo, Kapatid (TV5)
  - Enchanted Garden (TV5)
- January 5: Wil Time Bigtime (TV5)
- January 6: Lokomoko U Ang Kulit! (TV5)
- January 8: Skull Man (Hero)
- January 11:
  - Gintama season 2 (ABS-CBN 2)
  - Two Wives (ABS-CBN 2)
  - Toaru Majutsu no Index (Hero)
  - Pink Lipstick (TV5)
  - Aso ni San Roque (GMA 7)
- January 13:
  - .hack//Legend of the Twilight (Hero)
  - Hanasaku Iroha (Hero)
  - Needless (Hero)
- January 14: Hakuōki (Hero)
- January 18:
  - Magdalena (GMA 7)
  - A Beautiful Affair (ABS-CBN 2)
  - MMK Klasiks (ABS-CBN 2)
- January 20:
  - Game 'N Go (TV5)
  - Pidol's Wonderland (TV5)
- January 22
  - Absolutely Lovely Children (Hero)
  - Major (season 1) (Hero)
- January 25:
  - Hitman Reborn! season 4 (ABS-CBN 2)
  - Aryana (ABS-CBN 2)
  - Weekend Getaway (GMA News TV 11)
  - Lee San: The Wind of the Palace (GMA 7)
- January 26: Saturday Blockbuster (TV5)
- January 28:
  - Friends season 3 (Fox Channel Philippines)
  - Three Rivers (Fox Channel Philippines)
  - Galaxia Bots (Hero)
- January 30:
  - Crime Klasik (AksyonTV 41)
  - White Collar (season 2) (Fox Channel Philippines)
- January 31:
  - The 4400 (season 3) (Fox Channel Philippines)
  - Ultraman Mebius (Hero)
- February 1:
  - Princess and I (ABS-CBN 2)
  - Kahit Puso'y Masugatan (ABS-CBN 2)
  - Claymore (Hero)
- February 3:
  - Game 'N Go All-Stars (TV5)
  - Shiki (Hero)
- February 4: Yu-Gi-Oh! 5D's (Hero)
- February 7:
  - May Tamang Balita (GMA News TV 11)
  - The Princess' Man (GMA 7)
- February 8:
  - Marimar (Telenovela Channel)
  - Sana ay Ikaw na Nga (GMA 7)
- February 9:
  - MasterChef Pinoy Edition (ABS-CBN 2)
  - The Familiar of Zero (Hero)
  - Sinetanghali (TV5)
- February 10:
  - Sarah G. Live (ABS-CBN 2)
  - Kamisama Dolls (Hero)
  - Gintama season 1 (Hero)
- February 12: One Outs (Hero)
- February 13: Emily Owens, M.D. (ETC)
- February 14: Rescue (GMA 7)
- February 15: Ran: The Samurai Girl (Hero)
- February 16: Watta Job (GMA 7)
- February 17: The Million Peso Money Drop (TV5)
- February 18: XXX: Exklusibong, Explosibong, Exposé (ABS-CBN 2)
- February 19:
  - Patrol ng Pilipino (ABS-CBN 2)
  - Devil May Cry: The Animated Series (Hero)
- February 20: Ako Ang Simula (ABS-CBN 2)
- February 21: Krusada (ABS-CBN 2)
- February 22:
  - Yesterday's Bride (GMA 7)
  - A Gentleman's Dignity (ABS-CBN 2)
  - Storyline (ABS-CBN 2)
- February 27: RahXephon (Hero)
- February 28: Friends season 4 (Fox Channel Philippines)
- March 1:
  - Dos Por Dos (morning edition) (DZMM TeleRadyo)
  - Paroa: Ang Kuwento ni Mariposa (GMA 7)
  - Slayers Evolution-R (Hero)
- March 2:
  - Sabado Sineplex (TV5)
  - Kapuso Movie Night (GMA 7)
- March 3:
  - Asia's Next Top Model (cycle 1) (ETC)
  - Etcetera (season 3) (ETC)
  - Sunday Sineplex (TV5)
  - Sunday Blockbuster (TV5)
- March 4: Kyōran Kazoku Nikki (Hero)
- March 6: UAAP Season 75 Women's volleyball tournament (Studio 23)
- March 9: UAAP Season 75 Men's volleyball tournament (Studio 23)
- March 10: Skull Man (Hero)
- March 15:
  - Pahiram ng Sandali (GMA 7)
  - Super Sine Prime (TV5)
  - Super Sine 5 (TV5)
- March 16:
  - Hetalia: Axis Powers (Hero)
- March 17:
  - Innocent Venus (Hero)
  - Jigoku Shoujo (rerun) (Hero)
- March 23:
  - Pulsong Pinoy (PTV 4, RPN 9 (until October 22, 2012) and IBC 13)
  - Pretty Little Liars season 3 (ETC)
- March 24:
  - Kanta Pilipinas (TV5)
  - Yu-Gi-Oh! GX (Hero)
- March 27:
  - White Lies (TV5)
  - Rooftop Prince (ABS-CBN 2)
  - Captain Tsubasa (2001 version) (Hero)
- March 29: Gakuen Utopia Manabi Straight! (Hero)
- April 1: Sailor Moon S (Hero)
- April 2: Friends season 5 (Fox Channel Philippines)
- April 3:
  - Arjuna (Hero)
  - Tide-Line Blue (Hero)
  - Viewtiful Joe (Hero)
- April 5:
  - Inazuma Eleven season 2 (ABS-CBN 2)
  - Blue Dragon (season 2) (ABS-CBN 2)
  - You're Still the One (ABS-CBN 2)
  - Paraiso (ABS-CBN 2)
  - Jeepney Jackpot: Pera o Para! (TV5)
  - Temptation of Wife (GMA 7)
  - Showbiz Extra (DZMM TeleRadyo)
- April 6: The Legend of the Legendary Heroes (Hero)
- April 7:
  - SikaPinoy (DZMM TeleRadyo)
  - Alphas (season 1) (Jack TV)
- April 9:
  - Initial D (Hero)
  - Tokyo Magnitude 8.0 (Hero)
- April 11:
  - Code Geass (Hero)
  - Best Ink (Jack TV)
- April 12:
  - Kahit Konting Pagtingin (ABS-CBN 2)
  - Naruto: Shippuden season 4 (Hero)
- April 14: Bago 'Yan Ah (DZMM TeleRadyo)
- April 15: The Carrie Diaries season 1 (ETC)
- April 19:
  - Forever (GMA 7)
  - Smile, Dong Hae (GMA 7)
  - Kailangan Ko'y Ikaw (ABS-CBN 2)
- April 20: Para sa 'Yo ang Laban Na Ito (GMA 7)
- April 21: Bayan Ko (GMA News TV 11)
- April 22: Kamisama Dolls (Hero)
- April 25: The Greatest Love (GMA 7)
- April 26: Ohlala Couple (ABS-CBN 2)
- April 28:
  - H.O.T. TV: Hindi Ordinaryong Tsismis (GMA 7)
  - Campus Challenge (UNTV 37)
- April 29:
  - Deltora Quest (Hero)
  - Hi-5 (series 13) (Hero)
- May 2: Kandidato 2013: Senador (GMA 7)
- May 3:
  - Big (GMA 7)
  - Kidlat (TV5)
  - Friends season 6 (Fox Channel Philippines)
- May 4:
  - Pinoy Explorer (TV5)
  - The Following (Jack City)
- May 5:
  - Kapitan Awesome (TV5)
  - Super Inggo (Hero)
- May 7: Ceres, Celestial Legend (Hero)
- May 9: Michiko & Hatchin (Hero)
- May 10:
  - Glee season 4 (ETC)
  - Never Say Goodbye (TV5)
  - Gintama season 3 (Hero)
- May 11: Ran: The Samurai Girl (rerun) (Hero)
- May 12: Balwarte (TV5)
- May 13:
  - Dollhouse season 1 (Fox Channel Philippines)
  - Survivor: Caramoan (Jack TV)
- May 14:
  - 24 season 5 (Fox Channel Philippines)
  - Buffy the Vampire Slayer season 4 (Fox Channel Philippines)
  - Angel season 1 (Fox Channel Philippines)
  - Close to Home (season 2) (Fox Channel Philippines)
  - Over Drive (Hero)
- May 15:
  - Smallville season 4 (Fox Channel Philippines)
  - One Tree Hill season 2 (Fox Channel Philippines)
  - Lie to Me (season 1) (Fox Channel Philippines)
- May 16:
  - Chuck season 4 (Fox Channel Philippines)
  - The Unit season 1 (Fox Channel Philippines)
  - Without a Trace season 2 (Fox Channel Philippines)
- May 17:
  - Ghost Whisperer season 2 (Fox Channel Philippines)
  - Cold Case season 1 (Fox Channel Philippines)
  - Numbers season 3 (Fox Channel Philippines)
  - May Isang Pangarap (ABS-CBN 2)
  - Giant (TV5)
  - American Idol season 12 (ETC)
- May 18: Kyoshiro and the Eternal Sky (Hero)
- May 19:
  - Party Pilipinas (GMA 7)
  - Tagalog Action Movie (TV5)
- May 20:
  - House season 2 (Fox Channel Philippines)
  - Bones season 6 (Fox Channel Philippines)
  - Lost season 5 (Fox Channel Philippines)
- May 21:
  - The Vampire Diaries season 4 (ETC)
  - Digimon Adventure (Hero)
- May 22:
  - New Girl season 2 (ETC)
  - Hi-5 House (Hero)
- May 23: Gintama season 4 (Hero)
- May 24:
  - Glory Jane (ABS-CBN 2)
  - Little Champ (ABS-CBN 2)
- May 25: Boracay Bodies (TV5)
- May 31:
  - Unforgettable (GMA 7)
  - Indio (GMA 7)
  - Martin Late at Night (ABS-CBN 2)
- June 2: 2013 Shakey's V-League 1st Conference (GMA News TV 11)
- June 3:
  - Project Runway season 9 (ETC)
  - Grimm season 2 (Jack TV)
- June 4:
  - Major (season 2) (Hero)
  - 30 Rock season 7 (Jack TV)
- June 5: Friends season 7 (Fox Channel Philippines)
- June 6: Mobile Suit Gundam 00 (Hero)
- June 7:
  - Bukod Kang Pinagpala (GMA 7)
  - Love & Lies (GMA 7)
- June 11: The Legend of the Legendary Heroes (Hero)
- June 13: Kiba (Hero)
- June 14:
  - Karinderya Wars (TV5)
  - Ina, Kapatid, Anak (ABS-CBN 2)
- June 15: Hitman Reborn! season 4 (Hero)
- June 20: Queen and I (GMA 7)
- June 21:
  - To the Beautiful You (ABS-CBN 2)
  - Arjuna (rerun) (Hero)
- June 25: The Office season 9 (Jack TV)
- June 28:
  - I Do, I Do (GMA 7)
  - .hack//Legend of the Twilight (Hero)
  - Jigoku Shoujo (rerun) (Hero)
  - Tide-Line Blue (Hero)
- June 29:
  - Brickleberry (Jack TV)
  - Sine Ko 5ingko Indie 'To! (TV5)
- June 30: Teen Gen (GMA 7)
- July 1: Naruto: Shippuden season 5 (Hero)
- July 3: Tiger & Bunny (Hero)
- July 5:
  - Apoy sa Dagat (ABS-CBN 2)
  - Missing You (ABS-CBN 2)
- July 7: ETC HQ (ETC)
- July 8:
  - Friends season 8 (Fox Channel Philippines)
  - 666 Park Avenue (Jack TV)
- July 9: Engkwento (ABS-CBN 2)
- July 10: Saklolo (ABS-CBN 2)
- July 11: Demandahan (ABS-CBN 2)
- July 12: A Promise of a Thousand Days (ABS-CBN 2)
- July 15: The Catalina (ETC)
- July 16:
  - Major (season 3) (Hero)
  - Mirmo de Pon (Hero)
- July 17: The Mindy Project (2nd Avenue)
- July 18: Padam Padam... The Music of Their Hearts (GMA 7)
- July 19:
  - Yakitate!! Japan (ABS-CBN 2)
  - Kuroko's Basketball season 1 (ABS-CBN 2)
  - Home Sweet Home (GMA 7)
  - Ang Latest (TV5)
- July 22: Vampire Knight (Hero)
- July 23: Revolution (season 1) (Jack TV)
- July 24: Kuroko's Basketball season 1 (Hero)
- July 26: Guys with Kids (2nd Avenue)
- July 27: I-Shine Talent Camp (season 2) (ABS-CBN 2)
- July 30:
  - Project Accessory (ETC)
  - Kyo Kara Maoh! (Hero)
- August 2:
  - Gintama season 5 (Hero)
  - Cassandra: Warrior Angel (TV5)
- August 3: Daily Lives of High School Boys (Hero)
- August 6:
  - Raising Hope season 3 (Jack TV)
  - Parks and Recreation season 4 (Jack TV)
- August 7: Two and a Half Men season 10 (Jack TV)
- August 8:
  - Friends season 9 (Fox Channel Philippines)
  - Working!! (Hero)
- August 9: Gallery Girls (ETC)
- August 10: The Cleveland Show season 4 (Jack TV)
- August 11: Music and Memories (DZMM TeleRadyo)
- August 15: Dallias (season 1) (Jack City)
- August 16:
  - Kape at Balita (GMA News TV 11)
  - Absolute Boyfriend (ABS-CBN 2)
- August 17:
  - Tropang Kulit (TV5)
  - OA with Onse and Alex (DZMM TeleRadyo)
- August 18:
  - Talentadong Pinoy (TV5)
  - Skull Man (Hero)
- August 22: RahXephon (Hero)
- August 23:
  - Unexpected You (GMA 7)
  - Love Rain (ABS-CBN 2)
  - Kakambal ni Eliana (GMA 7)
  - Huwag Ka Lang Mawawala (ABS-CBN 2)
- August 27:
  - Initial D (Fourth Stage) (Hero)
  - Yakitate!! Japan (Hero)
- August 28: Fashion Hunters (ETC)
- August 30:
  - Undercover (TV5)
  - Misibis Bay (TV5)
  - CNN Konek (AksyonTV 41)
  - That Winter, the Wind Blows (ABS-CBN 2)
  - Friends season 10 (Fox Channel Philippines)
- September 3: It's Always Sunny in Philadelphia season 8 (Jack TV)
- September 4: Miss Advised (ETC)
- September 6:
  - Mundo Mo'y Akin (GMA 7)
  - Hakuōki (Hero)
- September 7: Hayop sa Galing (TV5)
- September 8:
  - Lokomoko: La-Bus (TV5)
  - Major (season 3) (Hero)
- September 9:
  - Aquarion Evol (Hero)
  - Digimon Xros Wars (Hero)
- September 13:
  - My Little Juan (ABS-CBN 2)
  - Kasangga Mo ang Langit (IBC 13)
  - Biyaheng Langit (IBC 13)
  - Rafaela (Telenovela Channel)
  - Digimon Adventure 02 (Hero)
  - Sailor Moon (Hero)
- September 15:
  - Blue Dragon (season 2) (Hero)
  - Hanasaku Iroha (Hero)
- September 16: Naruto Shippuden season 4 (Hero)
- September 20:
  - With a Smile (GMA 7)
  - Binoy Henyo (GMA 7)
  - Anna Karenina (GMA 7)
  - Gargoyle of Yoshinaga Family (Hero)
  - Yu-Gi-Oh! Zexal season 1 (ABS-CBN 2)
  - Naruto: Shippuden season 5 (ABS-CBN 2)
  - Personalan (GMA News TV 11)
- September 24: Partners (Jack TV)
- September 26: Major (season 4) (Hero)
- September 27:
  - Sailor Moon R (ABS-CBN 2)
  - Maghihintay Pa Rin (GMA 7)
  - Dugong Buhay (ABS-CBN 2)
  - News Team 13 (IBC 13)
  - The Medyo Late Night Show with Jojo A. (TV5)
- September 28:
  - Kapamilya, Deal or No Deal (season 4) (ABS-CBN 2)
  - Showbiz Inside Report (ABS-CBN 2)
- September 29:
  - The Voice of the Philippines season 1 (ABS-CBN 2)
  - Ultimate Spider-Man (ABS-CBN 2)
- September 30: Toaru Majutsu no Index (Hero)
- October 1:
  - Graceland (season 1) (Jack City)
  - Wilfred season 3 (Jack TV)
  - Legit (season 3) (Jack TV)
- October 4: Muling Buksan ang Puso (ABS-CBN 2)
- October 5:
  - Claymore (Hero)
  - The Familiar of Zero (Hero)
  - Giant Killing (Hero)
  - UAAP Season 76 Women's basketball tournament (Studio 23)
  - Kapuso Movie Night (GMA 7)
- October 6: Yu-Gi-Oh! 5D's (Hero)
- October 7: PBA on Sports5 (IBC 13)
- October 8: Louie season 3 (Jack TV)
- October 9: Hetalia: Axis Powers (Hero)
- October 11: Face to Face (TV5)
- October 12:
  - The Jollitown Kids Show (GMA 7)
  - Wowowillie (TV5)
  - UAAP Season 76 Men's basketball tournament (Studio 23)
- October 13:
  - Titser (GMA News TV 11)
  - The Buzz (ABS-CBN 2)
- October 17
  - GA Geijutsuka Art Design Class (Hero)
  - Hitman Reborn! season 1 (Hero)
- October 18:
  - My Husband's Lover (GMA 7)
  - A Woman of Steel (Telenovela Channel)
- October 20: 2013 Shakey's V-League Open Conference (GMA News TV 11)
- October 21: The Office season 1 (Fox Channel Philippines)
- October 24
  - Mission-E (Hero)
  - Mobile Suit Gundam AGE (Hero)
- October 25:
  - My Daughter Seo-young (GMA 7)
  - Juan dela Cruz (ABS-CBN 2)
- October 28:
  - Major (season 5) (Hero)
  - Gash Bell! (Hero)
- October 31: The Innocent Man (GMA 7)
- November 1:
  - Wish Upon a Star (ABS-CBN 2)
  - Mga Basang Sisiw (GMA 7)
- November 2:
  - Kamisama Dolls (Hero)
  - Sabado Specials: Shake, Rattle & Roll (ABS-CBN 2)
- November 5: UNTV Cup (season 1) (UNTV 37)
- November 13: Wednesday Night Thriller (TV5)
- November 15:
  - Lola (GMA 7)
  - Anak Ko 'Yan! (GMA 7)
  - The Love Story of Kang Chi (ABS-CBN 2)
  - Kahit Nasaan Ka Man (GMA 7)
  - Bukas na Lang Kita Mamahalin (ABS-CBN 2)
  - Friday Night Action (TV5)
- November 16:
  - Bingit (GMA 7)
  - One Day Isang Araw (GMA 7)
  - Toda Max (ABS-CBN 2)
- November 17:
  - Absolutely Lovely Children (Hero)
  - The Familiar of Zero (season 4) (Hero)
  - Gintama season 4 (Hero)
  - Hetalia World Series (Hero)
  - Needless (Hero)
  - Railgun (Hero)
  - Shigofumi: Letters from the Departed (Hero)
- November 20:
  - The Office season 2 (Fox Channel Philippines)
  - Fate/Zero (Hero)
- November 21: Devil May Cry: The Animated Series (Hero)
- November 23:
  - Sailor Moon R (Hero)
  - Tokyo Magnitude 8.0 (Hero)
- November 24: Naruto: Shippuden season 5 (Hero)
- November 25: Major (season 6) (Hero)
- November 29:
  - Fabulous Boys (GMA 7)
  - Pyra: Babaeng Apoy (GMA 7)
- November 30: Early Today (Fox Channel Philippines)
- December 2: Etcetera (season 4) (ETC)
- December 7: I Am Meg (season 2) (ETC)
- December 15:
  - Death Note (Hero)
  - Element Hunters (Hero)
  - Arjuna (rerun) (Hero)
  - Gakuen Utopia Manabi Straight! (rerun) (Hero)
  - Gargantia on the Verdurous Planet (Hero)
  - Hitman Reborn! season 2 (Hero)
  - Jigoku Shoujo (rerun) (Hero)
  - Ran: The Samurai Girl (rerun) (Hero)
- December 16:
  - The 4400 (season 4) (Fox Channel Philippines)
  - Survivor: Blood vs. Water (Jack TV)
- December 17: One Outs (rerun) (Hero)
- December 20:
  - The X Factor season 3 (Studio 23)
  - Mr. Bean (ABS-CBN 2)
  - Jackie Chan Fantasia (ABS-CBN 2)
- December 21: What's Up Doods? (TV5)
- December 22:
  - Dormitoryo (GMA 7)
  - Iron Man (ABS-CBN 2)
- December 23: The Office season 3 (Fox Channel Philippines)
- December 24:
  - Kuroko's Basketball season 1 (rerun) (Hero)
  - Kyōran Kazoku Nikki (Hero)
  - Trigun (Hero)
- December 27:
  - Genesis (GMA 7)
  - Akin Pa Rin ang Bukas (GMA 7)
- December 28:
  - I Dare You (season 2) (ABS-CBN 2)
  - Why Not? (ABS-CBN 2)
  - Katipunan (GMA 7)
  - Sabado Horror Night (GMA 7)
- December 29:
  - Star Cinema Originals (ABS-CBN 2)
  - Innermind on Radio (DZMM TeleRadyo)
- December 30: Best Men (GMA News TV 11)

=== Stopped airing ===
- September 28: (Reason: pre-empted by Final Show Miss World Indonesia 2013)
  - Kapuso Movie Night (GMA 7)
- October 5 and 12: (Reason: pre-empted by UAAP Season 76 Finals: DLSU vs. UST Game 1 and UAAP Season 76 Finals: DLSU vs. UST Game 2)
  - S.O.C.O.: Scene of the Crime Operatives (ABS-CBN 2)
  - Failon Ngayon (ABS-CBN 2)
- October 6: (Reason: pre-empted by One Run, One Philippines and Kapamilya All-Star Game Na!)
  - The Super Hero Squad Show (ABS-CBN 2)
  - FPJ: Da King on ABS-CBN (ABS-CBN 2)
- October 6: (Reason: pre-empted by Final Show Miss World Indonesia 2013)
  - Kapuso Movie Festival (GMA 7)
- November 9: (Reason: pre-empted by Bagsik ni Yolanda and Bandila)
  - S.O.C.O.: Scene of the Crime Operatives (ABS-CBN 2)
  - Failon Ngayon (ABS-CBN 2)
  - Toda Max (ABS-CBN 2)
  - Banana Split Extra Scoop (ABS-CBN 2)

=== Unknown ===
- Wasak (AksyonTV 41)
- Todo Bigay (AksyonTV 41)
- Morning Calls (AksyonTV 41)
- Manila sa Umaga (AksyonTV 41)
- Aksyon Solusyon (AksyonTV 41)
- Trabaho Lang with Paolo and Cherie (AksyonTV 41)
- Dokumentado (AksyonTV 41)
- Dong Puno De Kalibre (AksyonTV 41)
- Rescue 5 (AksyonTV 41)
- Presinto 5 (AksyonTV 41)
- Chef vs. Mom (AksyonTV 41)
- Cocktales (AksyonTV 41)
- It's More Fun with Philip (AksyonTV 41)
- Joe d' Mango's Love Notes (AksyonTV 41)
- Remoto Control (AksyonTV 41)
- Health Line (IBC 13)
- Pacific Xtreme Combat (IBC 13)
- The Main Event (IBC 13)
- Bigtime Bakbakan (IBC 13)
- Fight Quest (IBC 13)
- Fight Sports Knockouts (IBC 13)
- Fight Sports Greatest Classics (IBC 13)
- Fight Sports World Championship Kick Boxing (IBC 13)
- Fight Sports BWF (IBC 13)
- Knockout Sportsworld (IBC 13)
- Fight Sports Wide World of Fights (IBC 13)
- WWE Bottom Line (IBC 13)
- WWE SmackDown (IBC 13)
- Whacked Out Sports (IBC 13)
- Ka-Date sa DZMM (DZMM TeleRadyo)
- Lovelines (DZMM TeleRadyo)
- Batibot (TV5)
- Jackie Chan Fantasia (Hero)
- Bantay OCW with Susan K.: Ang Boses ng OFW (PTV 4)
- BRM BRM TV: Biyahe Rider Motorsiklo (PTV 4)
- Cine Movie Trailers (PTV 4)
- I-Connect: Balitang Social Media (PTV 4)
- Kris10 (PTV 4)
- Mystica's Mystic Road to Success (PTV 4)
- Sa Inyong Mga Kamay (PTV 4)
- Show Up: Ang Bagong Game Show ng Bayan (PTV 4)
- Young Minds Inspired (PTV 4)
- Be Alive (GMA News TV 11)
- Cinema Klasika (GMA News TV 11)
- SME GO! Powered by Go Negosyo (GMA News TV 11)
- A Blow to the Heart (Studio 23)
- Alias (Studio 23)
- Biyaheng Bulilit (Studio 23)
- City Hunter (Studio 23)
- Gusto Ko Maging Beauty Queen (Studio 23)
- Hardcore Brothers Easy Ride (Studio 23)
- I Am Legend (Studio 23)
- Legend of the Seeker (Studio 23)
- Marry Me, Mary! (Studio 23)
- My Girlfriend Is a Gumiho (Studio 23)
- Supa Strikas (Studio 23)
- The River (Studio 23)
- X-Men: The Animated Series (Studio 23)
- Gabay at Aksyon (Light TV)

== Networks ==
=== Launches ===
Date	Station	Channel	Source
January 13	Brigada TV	Analog Channel 39 (General Santos); Digital Channel 37 (General Santos); Sky Cable Channel 35 (General Santos); Lakandula Cable TV Channel 95 (General Santos); Marbel Cable Channel 21 (Koronadal); JVL Star Cable Channel 15 (Koronadal, South Cotabato and Sultan Kudarat); Sky Cable Channel 15 Polomolok; Sky Cable Channel 44 (Cotabato and Maguindanao); Cotabato Cable TV Network Channel 76 (Cotabato); Cignal TV Channel 114 (Nationwide)	
January 19	Blink Cinema	SkyCable Channel 25	
May	Comedy Central	SkyCable Channel 189 (HD)	
September 1	RTL CBS Entertainment	SkyCable Channel 53	
October 14	O Shopping	SkyCable & Destiny Cable Channel 11	
October 15	beIN Sports 2	SkyCable Channel 205 (HD)	
October 15	beIN Sports 3 Premier League	SkyCable Channel 206 (HD)	
October 15	H2	SkyCable Channel 202 (HD)	
November 30	HBO Hits	Cignal Channel 72 (SD) Channel 108 (HD) (now on Channels 54 and 214)	

=== Stations changing network affiliation ===
The following is a list of television stations that have made or will make noteworthy network affiliation changes in 2013.

Date	Station	Channel	Prior affiliation	New affiliation	Source
November 30	SBN	21	Solar News Channel (now RPTV)	ETC (now SolarFlix)	
December 1	RPN	9	ETC (now SolarFlix)	Solar News Channel (now RPTV)	

=== Rebranded ===
The following is a list of television stations or cable channels that have made or will make noteworthy network rebrands in 2013.

Date	Rebranded from	Rebranded to	Channel	Source
January 28	ESPN Philippines	Fox Sports Philippines	SkyCable & Destiny Cable Channel 31 (analog and digital); Cignal Channel 48	
January 28	ESPN HD	Fox Sports Plus HD		
November 30	Blink Cinema	My Movie Channel	SkyCable Channel 25	

=== Closures ===
Date	Station	Channel	Sign-on debut	Source
May 31	AKTV on IBC	13	June 2011	
December 23	Weather Information Network	Cignal Channel 3	May 2012	
December 31	Diva Universal		September 2010	

== Winners ==
These are awards held in 2013.

=== Local ===
This list only includes the Golden Screen TV Awards and Star Awards for Television.

Award ceremony	Best TV Station	Best Drama Series	Best Drama Actor	Best Drama Actress	Best Drama Supporting Actor	Best Drama Supporting Actress	Best Comedy/Gag Show	Best Comedy/Gag Actor	Best Comedy/Gag Actress	Best Comedy/Gag Supporting Actor	Best Comedy/Gag Supporting Actress	Ref.
4th Golden Screen TV Awards	ABS-CBN	Walang Hanggan (Original); Valiente (Adapted)	Gerald Anderson; Budoy	Marian Rivera; Amaya	Paulo Avelino Walang Hanggan; Neil Ryan Sese Munting Heredera	Helen Gamboa; Walang Hanggan	Pepito Manaloto (Comedy); Bubble Gang (Gag)	Ogie Alcasid; Bubble Gang	Angelica Panganiban; Banana Split	John Feir; Pepito Manaloto	Sheena Halili; Tweets for My Sweet	
27th PMPC Star Awards for Television	ABS-CBN; GMA	Juan dela Cruz (Primetime); Be Careful with My Heart (Daytime)	Coco Martin Juan dela Cruz; Richard Yap Be Careful with My Heart	Marian Rivera; Temptation of Wife	Arjo Atayde Dugong Buhay; Arron Villaflor Juan dela Cruz	KC Concepcion; Huwag Ka Lang Mawawala	Pepito Manaloto (Comedy); Banana Split (Gag); Bubble Gang (Gag)	Michael V. Bubble Gang	Ruffa Mae Quinto; Bubble Gang	—	—	

=== International ===
This list only includes the International Emmys and the Asian Television Awards.

Award	Category	Nominee	Result	Source
41st International Emmy Awards	Best Drama Series	Maalaala Mo Kaya	Nominated	
41st International Emmy Awards	Best Current Affairs	i-Witness: Alkansiya (Piggy Bank)	Nominated	
41st International Emmy Awards	Best News	24 Oras (24 Hours) : Typhoon Pablo	Nominated	
18th Asian Television Awards	Best Actress in a Leading Role	Marian Rivera, Temptation of Wife	Nominated	
18th Asian Television Awards	Best Actress in a Leading Role	Lorna Tolentino, Pahiram ng Sandali (Chasing Moments)	Highly Commended	
18th Asian Television Awards	Best Comedy Performance by an Actor/Actress	Michael V., Bubble Gang	Highly Commended	
18th Asian Television Awards	Best Entertainment Presenter/Host	Kris Aquino, Kris TV	Nominated	
18th Asian Television Awards	Best Reality Show	The X Factor Philippines	Nominated	
18th Asian Television Awards	Best Current Affairs Programme	Reporter's Notebook: Bagyong Pablo (Typhoon Pablo)	Nominated	
18th Asian Television Awards	Best News Programme	24 Oras (24 Hours) : Typhoon Pablo	Nominated	
18th Asian Television Awards	Best News Programme	Saksi: Typhoon Pablo's Trail of Death	Highly Commended	
18th Asian Television Awards	Best Natural History or Wildlife Programme	Born Impact: When Whales Strand	Nominated	

== Births ==
- January 14 - Euwenn Mikaell, actor
- January 20 - Sophia Corullo, actress (d. 2019)
- January 28 - Cassandra Lavarias, actress
- July 20 - Aaron 'Yorme' Sunga, actor and TV personality
- October 8 - Arhia Faye Agas, actress and commercial model

== Deaths ==
- January 24: Pepe Pimentel, TV host
- February 6: Henry Halasan, news director
- February 9: Elvie Villasanta, actress & comedian, mother of Ariel Villasanta
- March 14: Subas Herrero, actor, double pneumonia (born 1943)
- May 12: Tita Swarding, radio personality (born 1952)
- May 19: Bella Flores, 84, actress
- May 28: Eddie Romero, 88, director, National Artist of the Philippines for Theater and Film.
- June 24: Louella Yap Chiu, 50, Mother of Kim Chiu
- June 26: Sammy Lagmay, 55, former comedian
- July 5: Ama Quiambao, 65, actress
- September 13: Nora Daza, veteran gourmet chef, restaurateur, socio-civic leader and television host, 84, pneumonia
- September 15: Julius Camba, reporter, 28, car accident
- November 2: Renato del Prado, 73, Character Actor, colon cancer
- November 24: June Keithley-Castro, 66, broadcast journalist

== See also ==
- 2013 in television
