= Kap's Amazing Stories =

Philippine television infotainment show

- Title card
- Genre: Infotainment
- Written by: Brian Geli; Trina Velasco
- Directed by: Rico Gutierrez
- Presented by: Bong Revilla; Jillian Ward
- Country of origin: Philippines
- Original language: Tagalog

Production
- Executive producer: Mildred Natividad
- Camera setup: Multiple-camera setup
- Running time: 45 minutes
- Production company: GMA Entertainment TV

Original release
- Network: GMA Network
- Release: August 19, 2007 – July 6, 2014

Kap's Amazing Stories is a Philippine television infotainment show broadcast by GMA Network. Hosted by Bong Revilla, it premiered on August 19, 2007. The show concluded on July 6, 2014.

== Overview ==
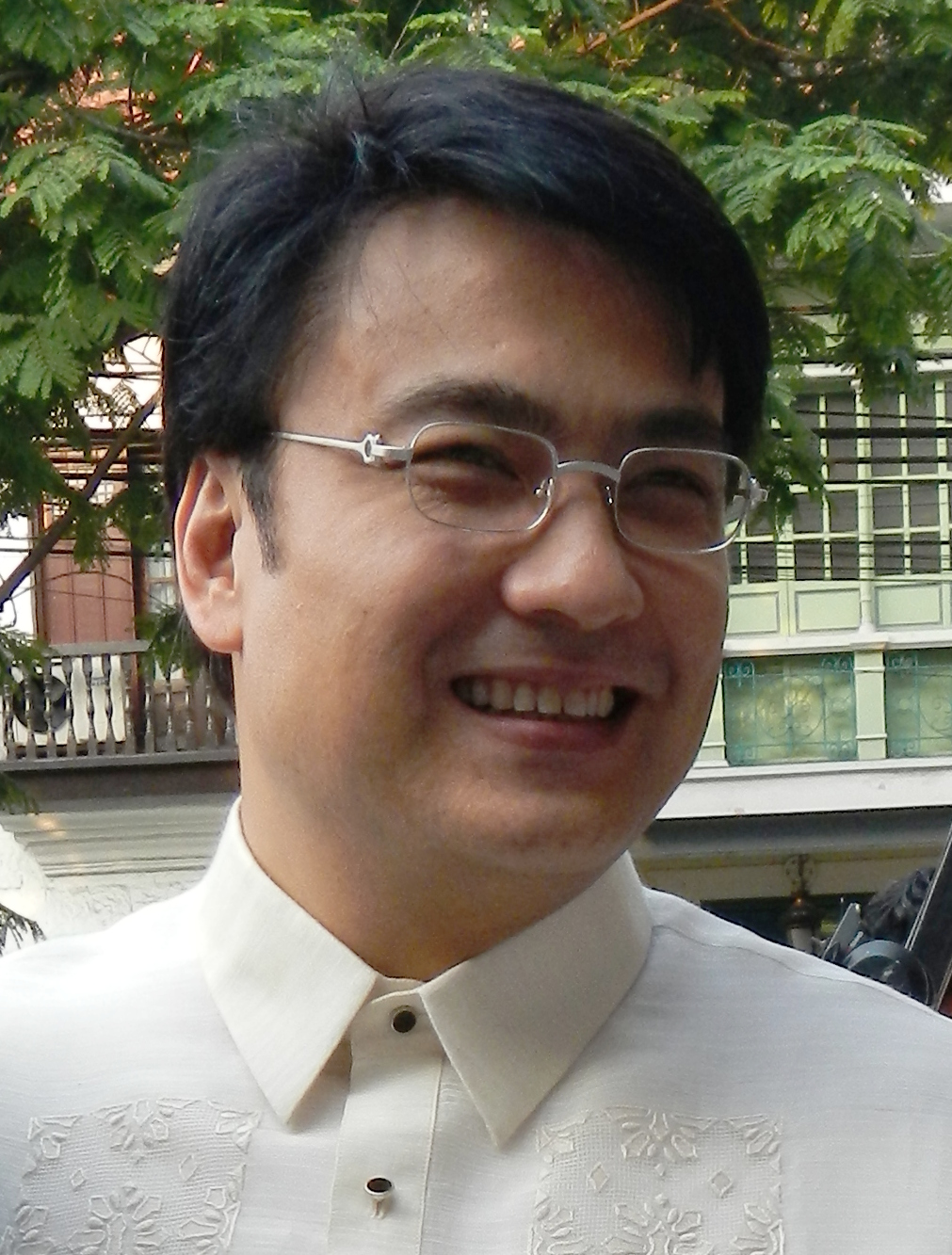
Bong Revilla serves as a host.

The show uses five clips sourced from various foreign documentary television series, ranked from five up to one. Clips are usually from National Geographic's Most Amazing and Astonishing Moments, Totally Wild, and Wild Case Files, truTV's Most Daring, Animal Planet's The Most Extreme, BBC's Life, Planet Earth, Life in the Undergrowth, The Blue Planet, Frozen Planet, and Africa, and History Channel's Stan Lee's Superhumans.

It also had a children's spin-off titled Kap's Amazing Stories Kids Edition that premiered on January 31, 2010, as Revilla was campaigning for a senator in the 2010 Philippine Senate election. Its presenters were Ramboy Revilla, Jayda Avanzado and Angeli Nicole Sanoy. Guest presenters in Kap's Amazing Stories Kids Edition include Ogie Alcasid, Carmina Villarroel and Elmo Magalona. The show ended in July 2010, after Revilla's re-election as Senator of the Philippines.

== Hosts ==
- Bong Revilla Jr. (2007–14)
- Jillian Ward as Marikít (2012–14)

== Ratings ==
According to AGB Nielsen Philippines' Mega Manila household television ratings, the final episode of Kap's Amazing Stories scored a 12.9% rating.

== Accolades ==
Accolades received by Kap's Amazing Stories
Year	Award	Category	Recipient	Result	Ref.
2009	23rd PMPC Star Awards for Television	Best Educational Program Host	Bong Revilla	Won	
2010	24th PMPC Star Awards for Television	Best Educational Program Host	Bong Revilla	Nominated	
2011	25th PMPC Star Awards for Television	Best Educational Program Host	Bong Revilla	Nominated	
2012	Anak TV Seal Awards	Most Well-Liked Program	Kap's Amazing Stories	Won	
2012	26th PMPC Star Awards for Television	Best Educational Program Host	Bong Revilla	Nominated	
2013	27th PMPC Star Awards for Television	Best Educational Program Host	Bong Revilla	Nominated	
2014	28th PMPC Star Awards for Television	Best Educational Program Host	Bong Revilla	Nominated	
