= Super Beaver =

Japanese rock band

Super Beaver スーパービーバー
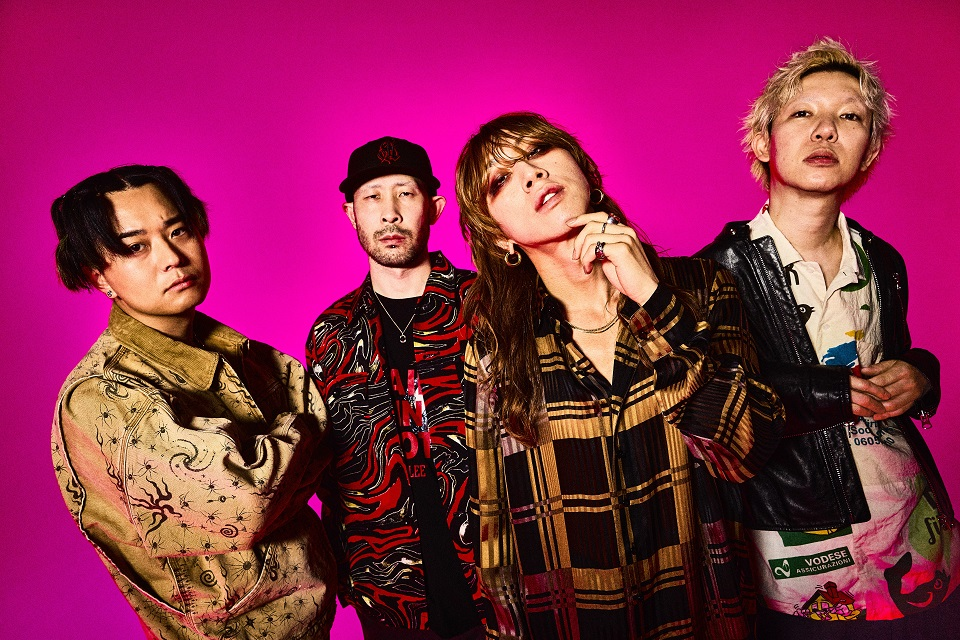

Background information
- Also known as: SPBV
- Origin: Tokyo, Japan
- Genre: Rock
- Years active: 2005–present
- Labels: rebelphonic; Epic Records Japan; I×L×P× Records; [NOiD]/Murffin Discs; Sony Music Japan
- Members: Shibuya Ryuta; Yanagisawa Ryota; Uesugi Kenta; Fujiwara Hiroaki
- Website: https://sp.super-beaver.com/

Super Beaver (abbreviated as SPBV) is a Japanese rock band formed in 2005. They are affiliated with murffin discs’ label [NOiD] and are currently signed to Sony Records. Their official fan club is the Super Beaver Friends Association (SUPER BEAVER友の会).

They are best known for their song "Shinkokyū" (深呼吸), which was used as the 9th ending theme for the fifth season of Naruto Shippuden, their song "Rashisa" (らしさ), which was used as an opening theme for Barakamon in 2014, and their song "Hitamuki" (ひたむき) for the sixth season of My Hero Academia in 2022.

They were in charge of performing the theme songs for all three live-action adaptations of the Tokyo Revengers series. "Namae wo Yobu yo" (名前を呼ぶよ) for Tokyo Revengers (東京リベンジャーズ), "Gradation" (グラデーション) for Tokyo Revengers 2: Bloody Halloween - Destiny (東京リベンジャーズ2 血のハロウィン編 -運命-) and "Hakanakunai" (儚くない) for Tokyo Revengers 2: Bloody Halloween - Decisive Battle (東京リベンジャーズ2 血のハロウィン編 -決戦-).

Their song "Ikigai" (生きがい) was written specifically for Fuji TV as a song to support athletes at the Milano Cortina 2026: Winter Olympics. As of January 22, 2026, the song's music video (MV) has reached 1 million views.

== Band members ==
| Name | Nickname | Position |
|---|---|---|
| Shibuya Ryuta (渋谷 龍太) | Bu-yan (ぶーやん) | Vocals |
| Yanagisawa Ryota (柳沢 亮太) | Yanagi (やなぎ) | Guitar, Composer |
| Uesugi Kenta (上杉 研太) | LEADER | Bass |
| Fujiwara Hiroaki (藤原 "37才" 広明) | Hiropon (ひろぽん) | Drums |

== Discography ==
=== Albums ===
| Year | Information | Songs Included |
|---|---|---|
| 2007 | Nichijou (日常): Released: December 5, 2007; Label: rebelphonic | 1. Nichijou saikuru (日常サイクル); 2. Mujou no kaze (無常の風); 3. Goodbye (グッバイ); 4. noise 5. Itsuka no fuukei (いつかの風景); 6. Kimi ga ikiru sekai (君が生きる世界) |
| 2008 | Shinkei (心景): Released: November 5, 2008; Label: rebelphonic | 1. Douhyou (道標); 2. pan 3. Reset (リセット); 4. Tenkiyohou (天気予報); 5. Yuki no ippo (勇気の一歩); 6. Boku no kotoba (僕の言葉); 7. Shinkei (心景) |
| 2009 | Koufuku Kido (幸福軌道): Released: November 25, 2009; Label: Epic Records Japan | 1. Koufuku Kido (幸福軌道); 2. Shiawase (シアワセ); 3. Futatsu no tabij (二つの旅路); 4. Chikyu-jiku (地球軸); 5. Denpa (電波); 6. Madaminu asue (未だ見ぬ明日へ); 7. Dr. Pepper (ドクターペッパー); 8. Tane no Hanashi (種の話); 9. Shinkokyu (深呼吸(album mix)); 10. Sayonara mo, arigatou (さよならも、ありがとう); 11. Nichijyo Cycle (日常サイクル); 12. Kaze (風); 13. Akaneboshi (アカネボシ) |
| 2010 | SUPER BEAVER: Released: October 6, 2010; Label: Epic Records Japan | 1. Hikari (ヒカリ); 2. how are you?; 3. Sora no kanata (空の彼方); 4. Akashi no uta (証の歌); 5. Refrain (リフレイン); 6. Sasayaka na (ささやかな); 7. Mawaru, mawaru (まわる、まわる); 8. home |
| 2012 | Mirai no Hajimekata (未来の始めかた): Released: July 11, 2012; Label: I×L×P× RECORDS | 1. Hoshi ni nariyuku hito (星になりゆく人); 2. Zero Kyori (ゼロ距離); 3. Yorokobi no asu ni (歓びの明日に); 4. Rule (ルール); 5. your song 6. Gensou (幻想); 7. Soshite tsunagaru (そして繋がる); 8. Sonohi wo matu youni (その日を待つように); 9. Hajimaru, mirai (始まる、未来) |
| 2013 | Sekai ga me wo samasu no nara (世界が目を覚ますのなら): Released: April 3, 2013; Label: I×L×P× RECORDS | 1. Soredemo sekai ga me wo samasunonara (それでも世界が目を覚ますのなら); 2. Tokyo ryuseigun (東京流星群); 3. Goodbye; 4. Ima (今); 5. Futari no koto (二人のこと); 6. Yorokobi no asu ni (Acoustic ver.)(歓びの明日に（Acoustic ver.)) |
| 2014 | 361°: Released: February 12, 2014; Label: I×L×P× RECORDS | 1. →; 2. 361°; 3. Anata (あなた); 4. Ai no ai no (愛の愛の); 5. Sentimental (センチメンタル); 6. ×; 7. Mada (まだ); 8. Siren (サイレン); 9. Kodou (鼓動); 10. Arigatou (ありがとう); 11. Yakusoku (約束。) |
| 2015 | Aisuru (愛する): Released: April 1, 2015; Label: [NOiD] | 1. Dareka (誰か); 2. Rashisa (らしさ); 3. Shoumei (証明); 4. Kekkaron (結果論); 5. Watashi (わたし); 6. Q&A; 7. Okagesama (おかげさま); 8. Iette (言えって); 9. Seikatsu (生活); 10. Aisuru (愛する); 11. ILP |
| 2016 | 「27」: Released: June 1, 2016; Label: [NOiD] | 1. 27; 2. Himitsu (秘密); 3. Kotoba (ことば); 4. Urusai (うるさい); 5. Aka wo nutte (赤を塗って); 6. Hitotsu (ひとつ); 7. Jibun makase (じぶんまかせ); 8. Honne (本音); 9. Masshiro (まっしろ); 10. Unmei (運命); 11. Aoi haru (青い春); 12. Hitotoshite (人として); 13. Subarashii sekai (素晴らしい世界) |
| 2017 | Mannaka no Koto (真ん中のこと): Released: September 6, 2017; Label: [NOiD] | 1. Fanfare (ファンファーレ); 2. Seikouhou (正攻法); 3. Hinata (ひなた); 4. irony 5. Okurimono (贈りもの); 6. Sore kurai no koto (それくらいのこと) |
| 2018 | Kansei Zenya (歓声前夜): Released: June 27, 2018; Label: [NOiD] | 1. Fugainai yoru koso (ふがいない夜こそ); 2. Niji (虹); 3. Senkou (閃光); 4. Love Song (ラヴソング); 5. Simply (シンプリー); 6. Machigaeta (まちがえた); 7. Shiawase (シアワセ); 8. Utsukushii hi (美しい日); 9. Ureshii namida (嬉しい涙); 10. Hitokoto (ひとこと); 11. Nakama (なかま); 12. Zenbu (全部) |
| 2021 | I Love You (アイラヴユー): Released: February 3, 2021; Label: Sony Music Japan | 1. Konya dake (今夜だけ); 2. Highlight (ハイライト); 3. Toppako (突破口); 4. mob 5. Jiman ni Naritai (自慢になりたい); 6. Paradox (パラドックス); 7. I Love You (アイラヴユー); 8. Yokan (予感); 9. Jidai (時代); 10. Hitoride Ikiteitanaraba (ひとりで生きていたならば); 11. Sayonara Zetsubo (さよなら絶望) |
| 2022 | 東京 (Tokyo): Released: February 23, 2022; Label: Sony Music Japan | 1. Special (スペシャル); 2. Ningen (人間); 3. Namae wo Yobu yo (名前を呼ぶよ); 4. Furari (ふらり); 5. Itoshii Hito (愛しい人); 6. VS.; 7. Soreppoi Futari (それっぽいふたり); 8. 318; 9. Mirai no Hanashi wo Shiyou (未来の話をしよう); 10. Tokyo (東京); 11. Roman (ロマン); 12. Saizensen (最前線) |
| 2024 | 音楽 (Ongaku): Released: February 21, 2024; Label: Sony Music Japan | 1. Setsubou (切望); 2. Gradation (グラデーション); 3. Hitamuki (ひたむき); 4. Living (リビング); 5. Atai Senkin (値千金); 6. Mekubase (めくばせ); 7. Dakkan (奪還); 8. Kesshin (決心); 9. Shiawase no Tame ni Ikiteiru Dake sa (幸せのために生きているだけさ); 10. Hadaka (裸); 11. Hakanakunai (儚くない); 12. Chiisana Kakumei (小さな革命) |
| 2025 | Acoustic Album 1: Released: December 3, 2025; Label: Sony Music Japan | 1. Hitotoshite (人として); 2. Hitamuki (ひたむき); 3. Seikouhou (正攻法); 4. Himitsu (秘密); 5. Gradation (グラデーション); 6. mob 7. Utsukushii hi (美しい日); 8. Atai Senkin (値千金); 9. Namae wo Yobu yo (名前を呼ぶよ); 10. Yokan (予感); 11. Q&A; 12. Setsubou (切望); 13. Soredemo Sekai Ga Me Wo Samasunonara (それでも世界が目を覚ますのなら); 14. I Love You (アイラヴユー) |

=== Singles ===
| Year | Information | Songs Included |
|---|---|---|
| 2009 | Shinkokyu (深呼吸): Released: June 3, 2009; Label: Epic Records Japan | 1. Shinkokyuu (深呼吸); 2. Manin Densha (満員電車); 3. Kyoukaisen (境界線); 4. Douhyou (道標) |
| 2009 | Futatsu no tabiji (二つの旅路): Released: August 26, 2009; Label: Epic Records Japan | 1. Futatsu no tabiji (二つの旅路); 2. Sign (サイン); 3. Conto'nroll |
| 2009 | Shiawase (シアワセ): Released: November 4, 2009; Label: Epic Records Japan | 1. Shiawase (シアワセ); 2. Shiawase Acoustic version (シアワセ-Acoustic version-); 3. Nantonaku (なんとなく); 4. Hesonoo (へその緒) |
| 2012 | Yorokobi no Asu ni (歓びの明日に): Released: April 6, 2012; Label: I×L×P× RECORDS | 1. Yorokobi no Asu ni (歓びの明日に); 2. Hello,World |
| 2013 | Anata (Another Ver.) (あなた (Another Ver.)): Released: December 14, 2013; Label: [NOiD] | 1. Anata (Another Ver.) (あなた(Another Ver.)); 2. Anata (Another Ver. / Inst) (あなた(Another Ver. / Inst)) |
| 2014 | Rashisa/Watakushi Goto (らしさ/わたくしごと): Released: September 24, 2014; Label: [NOiD] | 1. Rashisa (らしさ); 2. Watakushi Goto (わたくしごと) |
| 2016 | Kotoba (ことば): Released: January 27, 2016; Label: [NOiD] | 1. Kotoba (ことば); 2. Yorokobi no Asu ni (LIVE ver.) (歓びの明日に(LIVE ver.)); 3. Watakushi Goto (LIVE ver.) (わたくしごと(LIVE ver.)); 4. Siren (LIVE ver.) (サイレン(LIVE ver.)) |
| 2016 | Urusai (うるさい): Released: February 24, 2016; Label: [NOiD] | 1. Urusai (うるさい); 2. Ie tte (LIVE ver.) (言えって(LIVE ver.)); 3. Soredemo Sekai Ga Me Wo Samasunonara (それでも世界が目を覚ますのなら); 4. Anata (LIVE ver.) (あなた(LIVE ver.)) |
| 2016 | Aoi Haru (青い春): Released: March 23, 2016; Label: [NOiD] | 1. Aoi Haru (青い春 ) 2. Rule (LIVE ver.) (ルール(LIVE ver.)); 3. →(LIVE ver.); 4. 361°(LIVE ver.); 5. Tokyo Ryuseigun (LIVE ver.) (東京流星群(LIVE ver.)) |
| 2017 | Utsukushii hi/Zenbu (美しい日/全部): Released: January 25, 2017; Label: [NOiD] | 1. Utsukushii hi (美しい日); 2. Zenbu (全部); 3. 27(LIVE ver.) |
| 2018 | Yokan (予感): Released: November 21, 2018; Label: [NOiD] | 1. Yokan (予感); 2. Magokoro (まごころ) |
| 2020 | Highlight/Hitori de Ikite Ita Naraba (ハイライト/ひとりで生きていたならば): Released: June 10, 2020; Label: Sony Music Japan | 1. Highlight (ハイライト); 2. Hitori de Ikite Ita Naraba (ひとりで生きていたならば); 3. Mawaru, Mawaru (まわる、まわる) |
| 2020 | Toppakou/Jiman ni Naritai (突破口/自慢になりたい): Released: October 21, 2020; Label: Sony Music Japan | 1. Toppakou (突破口); 2. Jiman ni Naritai (自慢になりたい) |
| 2021 | Itoshii Hito (愛しい人): Released: May 19, 2021; Label: Sony Music Japan | 1. Itoshii Hito (愛しい人); 2. Hottoite (ほっといて); 3. Hachikireso (はちきれそう) |
| 2021 | Namae wo Yobuyo (名前を呼ぶよ): Released: July 7, 2021; Label: Sony Music Japan | 1. Namae wo Yobuyo (名前を呼ぶよ); 2. Tokyo Ryuseigun (東京流星群) |
| 2022 | Hitamuki (ひたむき): Released: October 30, 2022; Label: Sony Music Japan | 1. Hitamuki (ひたむき); 2. Himitsu -Acoustic ver.- ((秘密) -Acoustic ver.-) |
| 2023 | Gradation (グラデーション): Released: April 19, 2023; Label: Sony Music Japan | 1. Gradation (グラデーション); 2. Namae wo Yobuyo -Acoustic ver.- ((名前を呼ぶよ) -Acoustic ver.-) |
| 2023 | Hakanakunai (儚くない): Released: June 28, 2023; Label: Sony Music Japan | 1. Hakanakunai (儚くない); 2. Gradation -Acoustic ver.- ((グラデーション) -Acoustic ver.-) |
| 2023 | Kesshin (決心): Released: November 3, 2023; Label: Sony Music Japan | 1. Kesshin (決心) |
| 2023 | Ataisenkin (値千金): Released: December 27, 2023; Label: Sony Music Japan | 1. Ataisenkin (値千金) |
| 2025 | Namida no Shoutai (涙の正体): Released: January 24, 2025; Label: Sony Music Japan | 1. Namida no Shoutai (涙の正体) |
| 2025 | Kataomoi (片想い): Released: March 12, 2025; Label: Sony Music Japan | 1. Kataomoi (片想い); 2. Namida no Shoutai (涙の正体) |
| 2025 | Manazashi (まなざし): Released: May 14, 2025; Label: Sony Music Japan | 1. Manazashi (まなざし) |
| 2025 | Shuujinkou (主人公): Released: July 2, 2025; Label: Sony Music Japan | 1. Shuujinkou (主人公); 2. Manazashi (まなざし) |
| 2025 | Ikigai (生きがい): Released: December 22, 2025; Label: Sony Music Japan | 1. Ikigai (生きがい) |
| 2026 | Sanzen/Ikigai (燦然/生きがい): Released: February 11, 2026; Label: Sony Music Japan | 1. Sanzen (燦然); 2. Ikigai (生きがい) |

=== DVDs / Special Sets ===
| Year | Information |
|---|---|
| 2016 | SUPER BEAVER LIVE DVD 10th Anniversary Special Set 未来の続けかた: Released: October 12, 2016; Label: [NOiD] |
| 2017 | SUPER BEAVER LIVE DVD 2 Tokai No Rakuda Special at 大阪城音楽堂: Released: December 06, 2017; Label: [NOiD] |
| 2018 | SUPER BEAVER LIVE VIDEO 3 Tokai No Rakuda Special at 日本武道館: Released: July 25, 2018; Label: [NOiD] |
| 2020 | SUPER BEAVER LIVE VIDEO 4 Tokai No Rakuda at 国立代々木競技場第一体育館: Released: May 27, 2020; Label: [NOiD] |
| 2021 | SUPER BEAVER 15th Anniversary 音楽映像作品集 ～ビバコレ!!～: Released: March 31, 2021; Label: Sony Music Japan |
| 2021 | SUPER BEAVER LIVE VIDEO 4.5 Tokai No Rakuda Special in "2020": Released: October 27, 2021; Label: Sony Music Japan |
| 2022 | SUPER BEAVER LIVE VIDEO 5 Tokai No Rakuda Special at さいたまスーパーアリーナ: Released: April 27, 2022; Label: Sony Music Japan |
| 2022 | The Documentary of SUPER BEAVER 『東京』 Release Tour 2022 ～東京ラクダストーリー～: Released: September 28, 2022; Label: Sony Music Japan |
| 2023 | SUPER BEAVER LIVE VIDEO 6 Tokai No Rakuda Special at 富士急ハイランド・コニファーフォレスト: Released: November 15, 2023; Label: Sony Music Japan |
| 2024 | SUPER BEAVER LIVE VIDEO 6.5 Tokai No Rakuda Special in “2023-2024”: Released: October 2, 2024; Label: Sony Music Japan |
| 2025 | SUPER BEAVER LIVE VIDEO 7 Tokai No Rakuda Special at ZOZOマリンスタジアム: Released: October 29, 2025; Label: Sony Music Japan |

== Trivia ==
- Originally, upon the suggestion of his friend, Shibuya Ryuta wanted to name the band "Thumbtack" (画鋲).
- The name "Super Beaver" came about when Yanagisawa Ryota suggested naming the band after an animal. The word "Super" was added randomly. There is no particular deeper meaning to the band's name.
- The band was formed in 2005 where Shibuya Ryuta, Uesugi Kenta and Yanagisawa Ryota were high school seniors and juniors. While Fujiwara Hiroaki was Yanagisawa Ryota's childhood friend.
- In 2005, the band joined the Yamaha Music Foundation's Teens' Music Festival National Tournament (TEENS' MUSIC FESTIVAL 2005 全国大会) and won the Audience Grand Prize (オーディエンス大賞). The following year, they won both the Grand Prize and the Audience Grand Prize (ティーンズ大賞とオーディエンス大賞).
- Super Beaver is the first band under the private label [NOiD], which was founded by Shibuya eggman's staff, Yuma.
- Super Beaver hosts a radio show called "Beaver Locks!" (ビーバーLocks!) on Tokyo FM/JFN 38 every Friday from 10:30PM.

== See also ==
- Japanese rock
