= What's Up Doods? =

- Genre: Comedy; Late-night talk show
- Created by: TV5 Entertainment Group/Tentra, Inc.
- Written by: Dan Salamante; Keiko Aquino
- Directed by: Ivan Dedictoria
- Presented by: Edu Manzano
- Country of origin: Philippines
- Original language: Filipino
- No. of episodes: 14

Production
- Executive producers: Edu Manzano; Pamela Baldevioso
- Production locations: TV5 Media Center, Mandaluyong
- Running time: 60 minutes

Original release
- Network: TV5
- Release: September 14 – December 21, 2013

What's Up Doods? is a Philippine television comedy talk show broadcast by TV5. Hosted by Edu Manzano, it aired from September 14 to December 21, 2013.

Launched on September 14, 2013, What's Up Doods? is one of the 8 newly launched weekend programs under the "Weekend Do It Better" block of the network.

The show ends its Season 1 last December 21, 2013 with the episode feature some of the interviews from prominent personalities on the show.

== Segments ==
- Kaya Mo Doods?
- VidJoker
- Praisebook
- Bwitter
