= Fashion Hunters =

- Genre: Reality television
- Country of origin: United States
- Original language: English
- No. of seasons: 1
- No. of episodes: 11

Production
- Executive producers: Brent Montgomery; David George; Colby Gaines; Matt Anderson
- Camera setup: Multiple
- Running time: 22 minutes
- Production company: Leftfield Pictures

Original release
- Network: Bravo
- Release: October 4 – December 6, 2011

Fashion Hunters is an American reality television series that premiered on October 4, 2011, on Bravo. The series chronicles the life of several fashion designers working at Second Time Around as they go around New York City searching through the closets and attics of the city's elite. The cast includes Tara Muscarella, Karina Lepiner, Ambria Miscia and Wilson Payamps.

== Episodes ==
No.	Title	Original release date
1	"Consigning Women"	October 4, 2011
2	"Birkin Bash"	October 11, 2011
3	"A Miyake Mystery"	October 18, 2011
4	"If the Shoe Fits"	October 25, 2011
5	"Road Trip"	November 1, 2011
6	"Consigner Squabbles and Hot Male Models"	November 8, 2011
7	"Eco-Fashion Party"	November 15, 2011
8	"The Promised Land"	November 22, 2011
9	"Price Wars"	November 29, 2011
10	"Generosity Gems"	December 6, 2011
11	"Crazy for Coco's Puffs"	December 6, 2011
