= Para sa 'Yo ang Laban Na Ito =

2013 Philippine television talk show

- Title card
- Genre: Talk show
- Written by: Faith Monreal; Araceli Santiago; Angelica Tan
- Directed by: Louie Ignacio
- Presented by: Manny Pacquiao; Jean Garcia
- Theme music composer: Lito Camo
- Opening theme: "Para sa 'Yo ang Laban na Ito" by Manny Pacquiao
- Country of origin: Philippines
- Original language: Tagalog
- No. of episodes: 11

Production
- Executive producer: Lui Cadag
- Cinematography: Jimbo Mejia
- Camera setup: Multiple-camera setup
- Running time: 45 minutes
- Production company: GMA Entertainment TV

Original release
- Network: GMA Network
- Release: February 3 – April 20, 2013

Para sa 'Yo ang Laban na Ito (transl. this fight is for you) is a 2013 Philippine television self help drama talk show broadcast by GMA Network. Directed by Louie Ignacio, it is hosted by Manny Pacquiao and Jean Garcia. It premiered on February 3, 2013 on the network's Sunday Grande line up. On March 23, 2013, it moved to the network's Sabado Star Power sa Gabi line up. The show concluded on April 20, 2013, with a total of 11 episodes.

== Overview ==
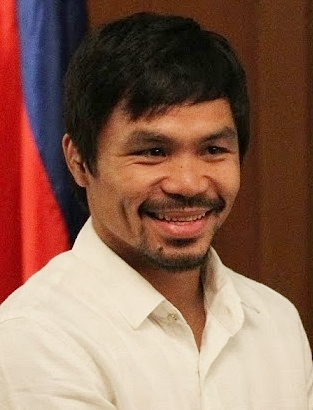
Manny Pacquiao served as the host.

The show is dubbed as GMA Network's very first "self-help" drama. It hosted by world boxing icon Manny Pacquiao and actress Jean Garcia, the show features real people with parallel life stories but have different endings. The show presented every life story via a short film and starred by some of the network's talents. Also in each episode, Pacquiao will share his own personal challenges and how he survived them with a series of difficult choices.

Following the show's main objective, Pacquiao and Garcia serve as coaches, helping and encouraging people to keep the faith, discover and believe in themselves, look straight, stand up and fight life's challenges.

With the battle cry, "Ang pagbabago ay magmumula sa desisyon mo..." (transl. Change begins in your decision...), the hosts will challenge their guests to fight life's battle. Thus, they ask their guests this question: "Palaban ka ba?" (transl. are you a fighter?).

== Notable episodes ==
- The pilot episode (February 3, 2013) featured the story of two mothers who were abandoned by their husbands and were left to raise their children alone. It is a topic close to Pacquiao's heart because he grew up with the same situation.
- The premiere episode (March 23, 2013) of the show for its new timeslot (the show moves from Sundays to Saturdays night timeslot) features the life story of Ivy Bascogin, an 18-year-old girl whose dream of being a teacher was suddenly hindered when her father has to stop from being a tricycle driver because of pneumonia. Meanwhile, her mother only earns five hundred pesos per week as a laundress. Because of poverty, Ivy was unable to continue her studies and chose to work in a small canteen as an all-around helper with a salary of one hundred per day.

== Ratings ==
According to AGB Nielsen Philippines' Mega Manila household television ratings, the pilot episode of Para sa 'Yo ang Laban na Ito earned a 9.9% rating. The final episode scored a 12.6% rating.
