= Naruto: Shippuden season 5 =

Naruto: Shippuden
- Season 5
- Season 5 Cover
- No. of episodes: 24

Release
- Original network: TV Tokyo
- Original release: December 18, 2008 – June 4, 2009

Season chronology
- ← Previous; Season 4 Next → Season 6

The fifth season of the Naruto: Shippuden anime series is directed by Hayato Date, and produced by Studio Pierrot and TV Tokyo. They are based on Part II for Masashi Kishimoto's manga series. The fifth season aired from December 2008 to June 2009 on TV Tokyo. It is also referred to by its Japanese DVDs as the chapter of The Three-Tailed Demon Turtle (三尾出現, Sanbi Shutsugen). A total of six volumes were published by Aniplex between June 3, 2009, and November 4, 2011. The anime only season follows Naruto Uzumaki and the Leaf Ninjas attempting to stop the Three-Tails and help a boy named Yukimaru.

The English dub of the season aired on Disney XD from July 30 to November 5, 2011. Episodes 89 to 98 were broadcast until the show was removed from Disney XD's schedule. The season premiered on Neon Alley starting with episode 99 from December 29, 2012, to January 7, 2013. The complete season would make its English television debut on Adult Swim's Toonami programming block and premiere from November 15, 2015, to May 15, 2016.

The first twelve episodes were collected in a DVD box by Viz Media on October 11, 2011. Additionally, Manga Entertainment collected the first episodes alongside the last ones from the previous season on November 7, 2011, in a 2-disc DVD set in the United Kingdom.

The season uses five musical themes: two opening themes and three ending themes. "Closer" by Joe Inoue was used as the opening theme for episodes 89 to 102. It was replaced by "Hotaru no Hikari" (ホタルノヒカリ; "Glow of Fireflies") by Ikimono-gakari for episodes 103 to 112. The first ending theme is "Long Kiss Good Bye" by Halcali used only for the first two episodes. "Bacchikoi!!!" (バッチコイ!!!; "Bring It On!!!") by Dev Parade was used as the second ending for episodes 91 to 102. "Shinkokyū" (深呼吸; "Deep Breath") by Super Beaver was used as the third ending for episodes 103 to 112.

== Episodes ==
No. overall	No. in season	Title	Directed by	Written by	Original release date	English air date
The Three-Tailed Demon Turtle
89	1	"The Price of Power"; Transliteration: "Chikara no daishō" (Japanese: 力の代償)	Hiroshi Kimura	Yuka Miyata	December 18, 2008	July 30, 2011
After Naruto Uzumaki has fallen down, Kakashi Hatake finishes off Kakuzu, and they return home. At Asuma's grave, Shikamaru tells Kurenai he will protect her unborn child. He plays Shogi with Shikaku and reveals what Asuma told him: the "king" that Konoha must protect is the next generation. After studying Kakuzu's corpse, Tsunade tells Kakashi not to let Naruto use Rasen Shuriken again because it will permanently destroy his ability to manipulate chakra. Meanwhile, Orochimaru, preparing for the final step with Sasuke, learns of Konoha's latest victory and sends Kabuto to meet with a woman named Guren.
90	2	"A Shinobi's Determination"; Transliteration: "Shinobi no ketsui" (Japanese: 忍の決意)	Yuki Kinoshita	Junki Takegami	December 25, 2008	August 6, 2011
An ANBU sends a message to Konoha moments before he dies, having discovered what may be Orochimaru's current hideout. Naruto, Sai, and Sakura eat at Ichiraku's. As Kakashi is ordered to go on a reconnaissance mission with Shino, Kiba and Hinata to find the hideout, Naruto is bothered over being warned not to use the Rasen Shuriken due to its extreme risk, wanting to be trained in jutsu that require less chakra. Naruto is reunited with Jiraiya, who offers to train with him again. They depart to a hot springs. As the events occurred, Kabuto relays Orochimaru's message for Guren to carry out a mission that Orochimaru believes she is perfect for, while expressing his desire to use Sasuke's body to fight the Leaf and Akatsuki. She initiates a death battle among the experimental subjects in her care with the survivors to be her subordinates. After Kabuto returns to Orochimaru, Sasuke Uchiha meets a boy called Yūkimaru.
91	3	"Orochimaru's Hideout Discovered"; Transliteration: "Hakken — Orochimaru no ajito" (Japanese: 発見 大蛇丸のアジト)	Yuusuke Onoda	Masahiro Hikokubo	January 8, 2009	August 20, 2011
Guren takes twenty-one survivors from the hideout and leaves to meet Orochimaru. Team Kurenai, led by Kakashi, arrives minutes later to her lair, finding the barely alive subjects before they are forced to escape when the hideout self destructs. Miles away, sixteen of the surviving subjects refuse to be experimented on by Orochimaru any further and attempt to kill Guren. By the time Shino, Kiba, Hinata, and Kakashi arrive, they find that the insects Shino sent ahead were subjected to the same fate as the sixteen subjects; Guren and the remaining five subjects had left while the rest were crystallized, to the horror of the Leaf shinobi. Meanwhile, as Kabuto escorts Yukimaru to their destination, Naruto and Jiraiya reach a hot spring with the former wanting to learn a long-range jutsu to use. But Jiraiya instead trains Naruto to use synchronizing jutsu, making him partner with Gamariki for training despite their mutual dislike for each other. Back at Orochimaru's lair, he summons Sasuke to test his abilities one on one.
92	4	"Encounter"; Transliteration: "Deai" (Japanese: 遭遇(であい))	Kunitoshi Okajima	Yasuyuki Suzuki	January 15, 2009	August 27, 2011
Kabuto brings Yukimaru to a lake, subjecting the boy to a state of pain with pills and a chakra amplifying helmet in an attempt to draw out a mysterious creature. Guren branches off from her men to meet up with Orochimaru while he had Sasuke fight an army of 1000 Sound Ninja as training. Sasuke defeats them all, sparing his beaten opponents as he wants to kill only Itachi. At the hot spring village, Naruto has enough of working with Gamariki, so uses the Summoning Jutsu to continue his training with Gamakichi and Gamatatsu, despite still not understanding the concept of connecting to another person's heart. Kabuto and Yukimaru arrive at the Hot Springs Village where Naruto and Jiraiya are, with Naruto encountering Yukimaru. Meanwhile, Orochimaru assigns Guren a special mission, and tempts her with the possibility that he will allow her to be his next vessel instead of Sasuke.
93	5	"Connecting Hearts"; Transliteration: "Kayoiau kokoro" (Japanese: 通い合う心)	Masaaki Kumagai	Shin Yoshida Yasuyuki Suzuki	January 22, 2009	September 3, 2011
Naruto continues his training with Gamakichi and Gamatatsu, before sharing an ice lolly with Jiraiya, then falling asleep. Jiraiya secretly leaves when a lead on the Akatsuki is presented to him. When Naruto wakes up, he finds only a letter from Jiraiya to return to the Hidden Leaf Village and continue training. But after returning home, Naruto, attempting to impress Konohamaru with his summons, learns that neither Gamakichi nor Gamatatsu can use Water Style ninjutsu, so he cannot infuse his wind chakra into a water pistol like Jiraiya did with Gamariki. As these events unfold, Tsunade receives one of Shino's crystalized insects for analysis while one of Guren's men, Rinji, learns about the presence of Kakashi's team through a bat that he sent out, as they continue their pursuit. Shino realises one of his insects survived the crystal jutsu, and attempts to find more so he can breed resistant insects.
94	6	"A Night of Rain"; Transliteration: "Ame hitoyo" (Japanese: 雨一夜(あめひとよ))	Kiyomu Fukuda	Shin Yoshida	January 29, 2009	September 10, 2011
Kabuto entrusts Yukimaru to Guren, who is told her ability is needed and that her success in this take is the only way Orochimaru will reconsider making her his vessel instead of Sasuke. But Yukimaru falls ill on their way to meet with her group and Guren is forced to spend the night in a cabin. In the morning, Guren finds Yukimaru playing an instrument that his mother gave him. After giving him a crystalized camellia that will never die as long as Guren lives, Guren and Yukimaru head back out. Meanwhile, as Naruto tries to teach Gamakichi and Gamatatsu how to use Water Style ninjutsu, as Kiba discovers that the enemy may be using bats while Tsunade decides to send out Yamato, Sakura Haruno, and Sai to support Kakashi and Team Kurenai.
95	7	"The Two Charms"; Transliteration: "Futatsu no omamori" (Japanese: ふたつのお守り)	Atsushi Nigorikawa	Shin Yoshida Yuka Miyata	February 5, 2009	September 17, 2011
As Guren meets up with her group, heading out to deal with the leaf ninja after Yukimaru gave him a memento of his mother's, Kakashi, Hinata, and Kiba move out while Shino stays behind to find some of his insects that developed immunity to the crystalization and breed more. Kakashi and the two Team Kurenai members soon find themselves attacked by Guren's forces. At the same time, after Gamatatsu finally learned to use Water Style, Naruto learns of his group's mission with Team Kurenai and talks Tsunade into letting him join. Tsunade agrees, with Naruto using what time he had left to master a collaboration jutsu with Gamatatsu.
96	8	"The Unseeing Enemy"; Transliteration: "Miezaru teki" (Japanese: 見えざる敵)	Shigeharu Takahashi	Yuka Miyata	February 12, 2009	October 1, 2011
Naruto continues his training with Gamatatsu, being projected out of his mouth, before Sakura comes to collect Naruto as he is delaying their departure for the backup mission. In the woods, Team Kurenai fights Guren's men. Hinata and Kiba get stuck in a smoke screen prepared by Kigiri and Hinata is seriously injured by Nurari's attacks. Kakashi is stuck battling Gozu, and isn't able to finish him off because Gozu has the upper hand in speed and force. Just as Rinji and his team are about to kill Hinata, Kiba and Akamaru return to save her. They are then forced to retreat by the arrival of Shino and his insects. Guren prepares her next move. Meanwhile, Yūkimaru remembers his mother.
97	9	"The Labyrinth of Distorted Reflection"; Transliteration: "Ranhansha no meikyū" (Japanese: 乱反射の迷宮)	Yuki Kinoshita	Junki Takegami	February 19, 2009	October 8, 2011
In Konoha, Tsunade discovers they have an enemy using Crystal Style, an ability to crystalize almost all surrounding matter on a molecular level. While on his mission with Team Kakashi, Naruto meets Yukimaru once again and talks to him. Guren puts a gigantic Crystal Labyrinth over the forest trapping Team Kurenai inside. Guren then prepares six Crystal Clones that she sticks on Kakashi and Team Kurenai. Hinata defeats one clone but is locked up in a Crystal Prison by another, Guren using her as hostage as Team Kakashi reaches the borders of the labyrinth and Naruto uses his new Wind Style: Toad Water Pistol Jutsu with Gamatatsu to bust a way in.
98	10	"The Target Appears"; Transliteration: "Arawareta hyōteki" (Japanese: 現れた標的)	Hiroshi Kimura	Shin Yoshida	February 26, 2009	November 5, 2011
With Guren's Crystal Labyrinth shattered, Team Kakashi arrives to help Team Kurenai retrieve Hinata and fall back. Guren decides to let the Leaf ninja retreat and rendezvous with her men at their base. Though Hinata survived crystalization by coating herself in her chakra, she is left weakened and left in Sakura and Sai's care while the rest go after Guren. Kabuto appears before Guren's group and escorts them to the lake, allowing only Guren and Gozu to come with him and Yukimaru. Once the boat is in position, having Yukimaru in agony again, Kabuto has Guren create five Crystal Pillars around them to harness Yukimaru's chakra to summon the mysterious creature under the lake: the tailed beast known as the Three-Tails.
99	11	"The Rampaging Tailed Beast"; Transliteration: "Arekurū Bijū" (Japanese: 荒れ狂う尾獣)	Yuusuke Onoda	Shin Yoshida	March 5, 2009	December 29, 2012 (Note: English air dates for episodes 99–338 of Naruto: Shippuden refer to its first premiere broadcast on the now–defunct Neon Alley web channel.)
Yukimaru summons the Three-Tails and immobilizes it while Guren tries to capture it, but it manages to break free and attack. Kakashi tells Naruto to investigate the lake, while they find Rinji and the others. Rinji and his men prepare an ambush, but Hinata, Sakura, and Sai arrive to avert it. Naruto summons Gamakichi and Gamatatsu and approaches the Three-Tails, where they see Yukimaru and learn of his allegiance to Guren. Trying to save Guren, Yukimaru tries to suppress the Three-Tails once more, before managing to escape with her.
100	12	"Inside the Mist"; Transliteration: "Kiri no naka de" (Japanese: 霧の中で)	Kunitoshi Okajima	Junki Takegami Shin Yoshida	March 12, 2009	December 29, 2012
Guren is rendered unconscious and relives her past as Naruto is caught in an illusion about Sasuke being used by Orochimaru. After Kakashi finds him almost attacking Kiba with the Rasengan, Teams Kakashi and Kurenai conclude the mist around them causes Genjutsu courtesy of the Three-Tails. After Guren wakes up, Yūkimaru suffers another fever and passes out. Tsunade hears of the Three-Tails from Pakkun, and remarks that it hasn't been heard of since the last war. Tsunade assembles Shizune, Ino, Tenten and Lee to join the others, and go and seal the Three-Tails before the Akatsuki do. Naruto and Sakura talk about the home that people should return to before Naruto heads off to find Yūkimaru.
101	13	"Everyone's Feelings"; Transliteration: "Sorezore no omoi" (Japanese: それぞれの想い)	Masaaki Kumagai	Yuka Miyata	March 26, 2009	December 31, 2012
Naruto runs into Guren while trying to find Yūkimaru, and battles her in a short fight. Yamato and Kakashi find Naruto and bring him back to the group. Kabuto tells Guren that Yūkimaru is only a tool to control the Three-Tails, which upsets her. Meanwhile, Shizune, Ino, Tenten and Lee meet up with the ninjas to tell them of their new mission to seal the Three-Tails before Orochimaru's group can capture it.
102	14	"Regroup!"; Transliteration: "Saihensei!" (Japanese: 再編成!)	Kiyomu Fukuda	Junki Takegami Yuka Miyata	March 26, 2009	December 31, 2012
Naruto and his teammates meet Shizune, Ino, Tenten and Lee. The ninjas are split into three teams by Kakashi. The Sealing team is made up of Shizune, Sakura, Ino and Hinata. Kakashi, Naruto, Sai and Shino form the Fighting team and the Guarding team consists of Yamato, Lee, Tenten and Kiba. Tenten passes Naruto a scroll for the mission that the Fifth Hokage gave to her. In a new development, Rinji turns out to be Kabuto's spy on Guren.
103	15	"The Four-Corner Sealing Barrier"; Transliteration: "Kekkai Shihō Fūjin" (Japanese: 結界四方封陣)	Atsushi Nigorikawa	Masahiro Hikokubo	April 9, 2009	December 31, 2012
The teams sets off. Naruto introduces Sai and Shino to each other. The sealing team prepares a search and barrier jutsu to seal the Three-Tailed Beast. Kakashi's fighting team is suddenly attacked by Gozu and Guren while the guarding team begins fighting as well. Lee, Tenten and Kiba finish off Rinji's subordinates with ease. Meanwhile, Naruto angers Guren saying it's his fault Yūkimaru went over to 'her side' and that he won't allow her using him as a tool.
104	16	"Breaking the Crystal Style"; Transliteration: "Shōton kuzushi" (Japanese: 晶遁崩し)	Shigeharu Takahashi	Shin Yoshida Junki Takegami	April 9, 2009	December 31, 2012
The Fighting team continues its battle. Tobi decides to go seek the Three-Tails on his own as he had angered Deidara earlier. He discovers the Shizune's sealing team trying to seal the Three-Tails at the lake. Sai engages Gozu, as Guren repels attacks in the form of Naruto's Rasengan and Kakashi's Lightning Blade. Shino's Crystal Style-resistant bugs defeat Guren, but Kakashi is stopped from killing her by Gozu, who apparently dies protecting Guren. The guarding team stops Rinji from interfering with the sealing team just as Guren remembers she is the one who killed Yūkimaru's mother. Kabuto uses this fact to manipulate Guren into following his orders, which are to use Yūkimaru to control the Three-Tails, and stop the Leaf shinobi from sealing it.
105	17	"The Battle Over the Barrier"; Transliteration: "Kekkai kōbōsen" (Japanese: 結界攻防戦)	Yuki Kinoshita	Yuka Miyata	April 16, 2009	January 5, 2013
Guren heads back to the lake with Yūkimaru and Kabuto to stop the sealing. Lee and Tenten guard the sealing team. Using herself as a decoy, and with Rinji's help, Guren manages to disrupt the sealing jutsu by attacking Lee and Tenten. Naruto intervenes with his collaboration jutsu, alongside Shino, but to no avail. The Three-Tails begins attacking the ninja on the lake. As the beast tries to attack Guren, Yūkimaru uses his power to make it stop, and Orochimaru's plan all along is revealed to have been to manipulate Yūkimaru to love Guren and willingly use his power for her, as he believes this power is much stronger than simply forcing the power out of Yūkimaru with Kabuto's pills.
106	18	"Red Camellia"; Transliteration: "Akai tsubaki" (Japanese: 赤い椿)	Hiroshi Kimura	Masahiro Hikokubo	April 23, 2009	January 5, 2013
Yūkimaru falters and the Three-Tails attacks Guren. Rinji also stabs her, provoking Yūkimaru's desire to protect her from dying. Yūkimaru uses his power to restrain the Three-Tails, but he runs out of chakra and is unable to do so. Guren leaves her position and protects Yūkimaru with a Crystal Style shield. Tobi, noticing the beast, goes to bring Deidara to it. Naruto goes out to find Yūkimaru, but ends up fighting the Three-Tails with Guren. Despite their efforts to defeat it, the beast overpowers the two of them, and then proceeds to swallow them. Meanwhile, Kakashi, Shino, and Sai find Yūkimaru unconscious and flee with him, leaving Kabuto frustrated.
107	19	"Strange Bedfellows"; Transliteration: "Goetsudōshū" (Japanese: 呉越同舟)	Toshiaki Kanbara	Yasuyuki Suzuki	April 30, 2009	January 5, 2013
Guren tries to attack Naruto within the Three-Tails, but passes out instead. Meanwhile, Sakura and Ino heal Yūkimaru while Kakashi, Shizune, Kiba, Sai, and Hinata search for Naruto. Guren awakens and is shocked that Naruto has helped her recover rather than kill her. Naruto tells her that he could not bring himself to kill a passed out ninja especially after helping him survive against Three-Tails. Naruto and Guren soon encounter a horde of mini Three-Tails that try to attack them, but they evade them and begin to argue about Yūkimaru. Guren accuses the Leaf of being hypocrites for preventing Orochimaru from attaining a Tailed Beast, while having the Nine-Tails Jinchuriki as their own. Naruto informs Guren that he would never allow Yūkimaru near a Tailed Beast, knowing first-hand the destructive consequences it can lead to. Guren says she simply wants to give Yūkimaru a home to return to. While Yūkimaru awakens, Naruto summons numerous Shadow Clones to look for a way out of the beast's stomach. Elsewhere, Kabuto gives Curse Marks to Rinji's men, ordering them to capture Yūkimaru.
108	20	"Guidepost of the Camellia"; Transliteration: "Tsubaki no michishirube" (Japanese: 椿の道標)	Kunitoshi Okajima	Shin Yoshida	May 7, 2009	January 5, 2013
Naruto and Guren help each other from the hungry mini Three-Tails as Rinji's men attack Lee's group. Yūkimaru and Kakashi devise a plan to track the Three-Tails with the boy's power to get Naruto and Guren out. Naruto and Guren are caught in the Three-Tails' illusion-making fog, forcing them to face their weaknesses; Sasuke and Yūkimaru's mother respectively. After Naruto and Guren escape from the fog, Naruto begins to realize Guren's good intentions, as she confesses to Naruto that she killed Yūkimaru's mother. At the lake, Yūkimaru then plays the song his mother taught him right above where the Three-Tails is submerged and Kakashi makes a crack in the beast's barrier, before dropping camellias; Naruto and Guren hear the tune and blast their way out.
109	21	"Counterattack of the Curse Mark"; Transliteration: "Juin no gyakushū" (Japanese: 呪印の逆襲)	Shigeharu Takahashi	Junki Takegami	May 14, 2009	January 7, 2013
The Sealing Team prepare to contain the Three-Tails again, and tell Sai to take Yūkimaru somewhere safe, but he is attacked by Kabuto's men. Rinji finds them, but they decide not to work for Orochimaru anymore. They suddenly begin to suffer side effects from their powers, and Rinji gives them an antidote after making them promise to not betray him. The Sealing Team is attacked by Rinji's men, but are defended by Kakashi, Yamato and Shino, who all notice that their opponents are much stronger than before. Rinji makes Yūkimaru eat more pills to control the Three-Tails. Guren wakes Naruto up, as the two witness that Yūkimaru is using his power again.
110	22	"Memory of Guilt"; Transliteration: "Tsumi no kioku" (Japanese: 罪の記憶)	Kiyomu Fukuda	Junki Takegami	May 21, 2009	January 7, 2013
The Sealing Team continues to seal the Three-Tails with Katsuyu's help while Kakashi, Yamato and Shino defeat Rinji's men and prepare to find Yūkimaru. Meanwhile, Naruto and Guren find Rinji with Yūkimaru, and Rinji reveals to him that Guren was the one who killed his mother. Yūkimaru forgives Guren, however Rinji tries to attack her but is stopped by Naruto. Rinji is then revealed to be Kabuto in disguise, who threatens to kill Naruto if he gets in his way.
111	23	"Shattered Promise"; Transliteration: "Kudakareta yakusoku" (Japanese: 砕かれた約束)	Yuki Kinoshita	Junki Takegami	May 28, 2009	January 7, 2013
Kabuto explains that he killed Rinji, and that Orochimaru wants the Three-Tails for an upcoming war. He summons Rinji's corpse to attack Guren. Guren manages to fight back by crystalizing herself along with Rinji. The huge crystal, with Guren and Rinji inside, drops into the lake, causing Yūkimaru to believe that Guren is dead. His grief causes the Three-Tails to fly into a rage. The Sealing Team are disrupted by this, while Kakashi and Yamato face off with Rinji's men yet again. Naruto uses his Collaboration Jutsu to assail the Three-Tails, with Gamatatsu using Toad Oil instead of water to create a pistol imbued by Gamatatsu's Fire Chakra. The Three-Tails is forced underwater. Naruto goes to Yūkimaru, and tells him they will go home together.
112	24	"A Place to Return To"; Transliteration: "Kaerubeki basho" (Japanese: 帰るべき場所)	Shigeharu Takahashi	Yuka Miyata Junki Takegami	June 4, 2009	January 7, 2013
As Yūkimaru sleeps, Naruto watches over him. Yūkimaru notices that the crystallised camellia from Guren is no longer cracked. Gozu rescues Guren at the bottom of the lake and Yukimaru, who has lost his ability to control the Three-Tails due to the scale of his exertion, leaves with Guren and Gozu. Tsunade orders the teams to return to the village to regroup because of their wounds, and her calculation that without Yūkimaru's abilities, neither Orochimaru nor the Akatsuki would also be unable to capture the beast. She sends ANBU to keep watch over the lake. Tobi and Deidara, meanwhile, return to the lake. After Deidara kills the ANBU members, the two Akatsuki members lure out the Three Tails, capturing it easily.

== Home media release ==
=== Japanese ===
Volume	Date	Discs	Episodes	Reference
1	June 3, 2009	1	89–92	
2	July 1, 2009	1	93–96	
3	August 5, 2009	1	97–100	
4	September 2, 2009	1	101–104	
5	October 7, 2009	1	105–108	
6	November 4, 2009	1	109–112	

=== English ===
Viz Media (North America, Region 1)
Box set	Date	Discs	Episodes	Reference
8	October 11, 2011	3	89–100	
9	January 24, 2012	3	101–112	

Viz Media (North America, Region 1 Blu-ray sets)
Volume	Date	Discs	Episodes	Ref.
4	September 10, 2024	4	83–110	
5	January 14, 2025	4	111–137	

Manga Entertainment (United Kingdom, Region 2)
Volume	Date	Discs	Episodes	Reference
8	February 24, 2012	2	89–100	
9	June 4, 2012	2	101–112	

Madman Entertainment (Australia/New Zealand, Region 4)
Collection	Date	Discs	Episodes	Reference
8	February 15, 2012	2	89–100	
9	May 23, 2012	2	101–112	
