= 24 Oras Northern Mindanao =

- Also known as: Testigo Northern Mindanao
- Genre: News broadcasting
- Presented by: Joe Legaspina
- Country of origin: Philippines
- Original language: Cebuano

Production
- Running time: 30-45 minutes
- Production company: GMA News and Public Affairs

Original release
- Network: GMA Northern Mindanao
- Release: February 5, 2013 – April 24, 2015

24 Oras Northern Mindanao, formerly Testigo Northern Mindanao, is a Philippine television news broadcasting program broadcast by GMA Northern Mindanao. Originally anchored by Kenneth Ragpala, it premiered on February 5, 2013, replacing Isyu Karon. Joe Legaspina served as the final anchor.

== Overview ==
The program delivered news and current events coming from Northern Mindanao, Caraga, and parts of Zamboanga Peninsula (including Isabela City, Jolo and Bongao). It was simulcast on TV-12 Bukidnon, TV-11 Iligan, TV-5 Ozamiz, TV-4 Dipolog, and TV-3 Pagadian.

== History ==
=== 2013-2014: As Testigo Northern Mindanao ===
Testigo Northern Mindanao premiered on February 5, 2013, after the launch of GMA Northern Mindanao, with Kenneth Ragpala as its first anchor. Reporter Joe Legaspina later joined Ragpala as his co-anchor. Before the year 2013 ended, Ragpala left the newscast, leaving Legaspina as the newscast's sole anchor.

This was also the first time that a regional newscast with the same name in Davao City had spun off into another regional newscast for Cagayan de Oro and Northern Mindanao viewers.

=== 2014-2015: As 24 Oras Northern Mindanao and Aftermath ===
Following changes of its now-main newscast 24 Oras, Testigo Northern Mindanao was rebranded as 24 Oras Northern Mindanao effective November 10, 2014.

However, that change suddenly cut short when the newscast was abruptly canceled on April 24, 2015, after more than two years of broadcast due to the strategic streamlining happening to all provincial stations of the network. Following the cancellation was the retrenchment of its staff and personalities and the closure of the network's regional news department.

GMA Northern Mindanao would not have a regional newscast until four years later, when it became a part of GMA Regional TV One Mindanao, with Cyril Chaves serving as the anchor of the newscast.

== Area of Coverage ==
- Cagayan de Oro and Misamis Oriental
- Ozamiz City and Misamis Occidental
- Iligan City and Lanao del Norte
- Marawi City and Lanao del Sur
- Malaybalay City and Bukidnon
- Dipolog City and Zamboanga del Norte
- Pagadian City and Zamboanga del Sur
- Mambajao and Camiguin
- Butuan City
- Surigao City
- Bayugan City
- Cabadbaran City
- Agusan del Norte
- Agusan del Sur
- Surigao del Norte
- Dinagat Islands
- Ipil and Zamboanga Sibugay

== Final anchor ==
- Joe Legaspina

== Final reporters ==
- Jeik Compo
- Joane Tabique-Abesamis
- Kaye Mercado
- Francis Damit

== Former anchor and reporters ==
- Kenneth Ragpala
- Christian Gonzales
- Emily Rafols
- Pia Abas
- Jacky Cabatuan
- Brecil Kempis
- Aude Hampong
