= Bingit =

2013 Philippine television drama series

- Title card
- Genre: Docudrama
- Directed by: Rico Gutierrez; Lem Lorca
- Country of origin: Philippines
- Original language: Tagalog
- No. of episodes: 9

Production
- Camera setup: Multiple-camera setup
- Running time: 45 minutes
- Production company: GMA News and Public Affairs

Original release
- Network: GMA Network
- Release: September 21 – November 16, 2013

Bingit (transl. brink) is a 2013 Philippine television docudrama anthology series broadcast by GMA Network. Directed by Rico Gutierrez and Lem Lorca, it premiered on September 21, 2013 on the network's Sabado Star Power sa Hapon line up. The series concluded on November 16, 2013, with a total of nine episodes.

== Format ==
The forty-five-minute "human drama" centers on the comprehensive re-enactment of the chain of events leading to the actual accidents or life-threatening circumstances as told by the person involved. Using the elements of interview, dramatization, actual footage, and photos, the television program magnifies how one's decision, coupled with the power of the human spirit, can overcome any situation.

== Production and development ==
According to the show's program manager, Enri Calaycay, the concept of the show started not to tell stories literally about the "near-death" experiences but to show what happens when a person comes to a tipping point of his life that would make him realize that he has to make a decision.

Calaycay further stated "[...] when we presented the concept, there was an input that to make it easier for viewers to understand, because the initial concept was quite 'general'. [So] they said why not use literally the "bingit", after all, near-death stories are interesting too." Thus, the production team wasted no time pulling together stories that are interesting and remarkable. The production also decided not to hire presenter as they wanted to highlight [and for the audience to focus] more on the featured stories.

The show was slated to run for one season, comprising nine episodes. The show premiered on September 21, 2013, with the episode "Sulyap ng Kamatayan" (transl. Glimpse of Death), which featured the story of Sr. Insp. June Paulo Abrazado, the aide-de-camp of the late Department of the Interior and Local Government secretary Jesse Robredo. Abrazado is the lone survivor in the plane crash that killed Robredo, pilot Capt. Jessup Bahinting and co-pilot Kshitiz Chand when the private plane owned by Bahinting crashed in the waters off Masbate in August 2012. According to Calaycay, it is the first time that Abrazado shares his story on television after the accident and death of Robredo. Calaycay also stated that they really wanted to kick off the program, with Abrazado's recollection of the actual happening of what can be considered as "a hair's breadth away from death" moment for him, in time for the annual feast day of Our Lady of Peñafrancia, wherein Robredo and Abrazado are both devotees. Actor Mark Herras plays Abrazado while Vaness del Moral plays Abrazado's wife Lourvila.

== Ratings ==
According to AGB Nielsen Philippines' Mega Manila household television ratings, the pilot episode of Bingit earned a 9.4% rating. The final episode scored a 10% rating.
