= Kuroko's Basketball season 1 =

First season of the Kuroko's Basketball anime television series

Kuroko's Basketball
- Season 1
- Box art of the first Blu-ray compilation released on July 27, 2012
- No. of episodes: 25

Release
- Original network: MBS TV; Tokyo MX; BS11
- Original release: April 7 – September 22, 2012

Season chronology
- Next → Season 2

Kuroko's Basketball is an anime series adapted from the manga of the same name by Tadatoshi Fujimaki. It is produced by Production I.G and directed by Shunsuke Tada, it premiered on Mainichi Broadcasting System on April 7, 2012 – with Tokyo MX, Nippon BS Broadcasting, and Animax premiering in the following weeks. The final episode of season 1 aired on September 22, 2012, and was announced in the seasonal published Jump Next! winter issue that a second season had been green-lit, and aired on October 5, 2013. The anime was also simulcast on Crunchyroll as part of their spring line-up of anime titles. The anime's first DVD and Blu-ray compilation was released on July 27, 2012 with a new DVD/Blu-ray compilation being released monthly. As of December 2012, seven DVD/Blu-ray compilations have been released.

The first season uses four different pieces of theme music; two opening themes and two ending themes. The first opening theme is "Can Do" by Granrodeo, while the second theme is "Rimfire" by the same band. The first ending theme is "Start it right away" by Hyadain and the second is "Catal Rhythm" (カタルリズム, Kataru Rizumu) by Oldcodex.

On October 19, 2020, the SAG-AFTRA listed and approved an English dub for the anime under the Netflix Dubbing Agreement. The English-dubbed first season debuted on Netflix on January 15, 2021.

== Episode list ==
No. overall	No. in season	Title	Original release date
1	1	"I am Kuroko"; Transliteration: "Kuroko wa Boku desu" (Japanese: 黒子はボクです)	April 7, 2012
On clubs day at Seirin Private Highschool – which only formed one year prior, thus having no third year students – first year students Taiga Kagami and Tetsuya Kuroko join the basketball club. The club's coach, Riko Aida, sees no limit to the potential of Kagami – who happens to have lived and played basketball in America – while Kuroko appears to be below average, despite previously being a regular of the Teiko Basketball team, famously known as "The Generation of Miracles". Kuroko challenges Kagami to a one-on-one match and fails to impress Kagami until the first-years go up against the 2nd years in a practice match and Kuroko ends up impressing everybody with his skill of using his lack of presence and misdirection to specialize in passing. Kagami declares he will become Japan's best player. Kuroko states it is impossible for him to do it alone, but that he has decided to be the shadow to Kagami's light.
2	2	"I am Serious"; Transliteration: "Honki desu" (Japanese: 本気です)	April 14, 2012
The coach sets an "entrance exam" for the first-years, to shout their commitment to win the national championships from the school roof-tops during Monday morning assembly. A teacher interrupts before Kuroko's turn, but he later writes his in chalk in the courtyard. Kuroko explains his reason for joining the Seirin team was his disagreement with Teiko's motto of "winning is everything", and their no-team-play style. The coach sets up a practice match with Kaijou, a strong team, with one of the members of the Generation of Miracles, Ryota Kise. Kise visits Seirin, and Kagami challenges him to a one-one. Kise beats him, by using his specialty, the ability to copy other player's moves and amplify them.
3	3	"It's Better If I Can't Win"; Transliteration: "Katenee Gurai ga Chōdo ii" (Japanese: 勝てねェぐらいがちょうどいい)	April 21, 2012
Seirin visit Kaijou for the match, and are insulted that the coach, Takeuchi, underestimating them, has only allocated half the court for the match and tells Kise to sit out. Kagami scores the first goal and breaks the hoop, forcing them to play on the full court. Kise joins the game, and he and Kagami alternate scoring goals. Seirin calls for a time-out and Kuroko reveals that his misdirection wears off the more he plays. Kagami is pleased at the challenge Kaijou presents, and tells Kise that Kuroko is his weakness, due to his invisible play style.
4	4	"Take Care of the Counterattack!"; Transliteration: "Gyakushū Yoroshiku!" (Japanese: 逆襲よろしく！)	April 28, 2012
The first quarter finishes with Kaijou in the lead, 27–35. Kagami starts coordinating with Kuroko, and the flow of the game switches in Seirin's favor until Kise accidentally hits Kuroko, who has to sit out. Play continues, with Kagami focusing on defense and leaving offence to the 2nd years. By fourth quarter, the team still hasn't caught up to Kaijo, and Kuroko re-enters the match. The pace picks up and the score is tied. In the last few seconds, Kuroko and Kagami score with an alley-oop, beating Kaijou, 100–98.
5	5	"Your Basketball"; Transliteration: "Omae no Basuke" (Japanese: おまえのバスケ)	May 5, 2012
Kise is shocked by his first ever loss. Midorima, the Generation of Miracles' number one shooter, shows up and chastises Kise for losing. Seirin celebrates their victory by visiting a steakhouse. Kise asks Kuroko why he left basketball in middle school; Kuroko tells him he hated basketball at the time. Kise predicts that Kagami will eventually grow apart from his team due to his strength. Kuroko intervenes between some thugs harassing street basketballers. Kise, Kagami and Kuroko team up to beat the bullies at basketball.
6	6	"Let Me Tell You Two Things"; Transliteration: "Futatsu Itte Oku ze" (Japanese: 2つ言っておくぜ)	May 12, 2012
The second years task the first years with getting some highly sought after "special bread" from the cafeteria. Seirin learns that they will face Shutoku, who holds one of the members of the Generation of Miracles, in the finals of the Inter High preliminaries. However, their first match is against Shinkyo Academy, who have brought in a foreign player, Papa Mbaye Siki, who is even taller than Kagami. To prepare, Kagami undergoes man-to-man defensive training with Mitobe, while Kuroko undergoes endurance training. The match with Shinkyo begins, and as the game progresses, Kagami promises Papa to block one of his shots and that Kuroko will give him a hard time for calling him a child.
7	7	"You'll See Something Amazing"; Transliteration: "Sugoi mon Mireru wa yo" (Japanese: すごいもん見れるわよ)	May 19, 2012
First quarter finishes with Seirin in the lead, 8–23. Kuroko is subbed out to conserve his energy, leaving Kagami to deal with Papa alone. With five minutes left of the last quarter, Seirin is in the lead by a close margin (51–60). Kuroko is subbed back in. Kagami finally manages to block Papa's shot, and Seirin win the match 67–79. Seirin go on to crush their next few opponents. Realizing too much confidence is brewing, the team is taken to watch a Shutoku match (the team of Midorima Shintaro). Shutoku wins, 153–21. Seirin realise they will face two of the "three emperor teams" on the same day, with Seiho in the semifinal and Shutoku in the grand final.
8	8	"Now That I Think About It"; Transliteration: "Aratamete Omoimashita" (Japanese: 改めて思いました)	May 26, 2012
Seirin's next match is against Seiho, who are known for their defense, and defeated Seirin the previous year, leading them to the brink of quitting basketball. Kuroko, is determined to win the match for the seniors. Elsewhere, Kise checks the "Oha Asa" horoscope (which tends to foretell how well Midorima will play). Midorima has the top fortune while Kuroko has the worst. Seiho's Tsugawa Tomoki, who managed to stop Kise in middle school, is up against Kagami. After first quarter, Riko tells Seirin that Seiho use old martial arts movement techniques. Kagami manages to beat Kasuga with speed, and scores the first basket.
9	9	"To Win"; Transliteration: "Katsu tame ni" (Japanese: 勝つために)	June 2, 2012
In Shutoku's game, Midorima subs out after only five minutes to conserve strength for the Grand final match. Kagami gets his third foul, Seiho's Tsugawa speaks carelessly again, which only fires up Kuroko, and at the end of the first quarter the score is tied 19–19. Together, Kuroko and Kagami again manage to penetrate Seiho's defense but are rapidly running out of energy. Kagami makes his fourth foul, and he are Kuroko are subbed out, to also conserve their energy for their next game. The seniors hold their own, using their specialties such as Izuki's "Eagle Eye". With less than five minutes left in the game, and Seiho in the lead, 58–64, Koganei gets a light concussion, and Kuroko subs back in to pay back Kagami's grudge against Tsugawa.
10	10	"I Can't Have That"; Transliteration: "Komari masu" (Japanese: 困ります)	June 9, 2012
Kuroko immediately passes Tsugawa's defense, and the seniors infiltrate Seiho's defense by predicting their habitual movements. Kagami is impressed, having never seen Kuroko's passing from the sidelines. In the last 30 seconds, Seirin is in the lead by one point until Seiho score a dunk, and tighten their defense. Kuroko narrowly avoids an intercept and passes to Hyuga who scores the final goal, Seirin defeating Seiho, 73–71. Meanwhile Shutoku win their match, 113–38. Kuroko's presence is noted by one of the Shutoku members in the bathrooms. The game begins with Midorima blocking Kagami's attempt at an alley-oop. Midorima scores the first goal with a three, but Kuroko makes a surprise retaliation by passing across the whole court to Kagami, who scores with a dunk.
11	11	"It's Not Like That"; Transliteration: "Sonna mon ja nee daro" (Japanese: そんなもんじゃねえだろ)	June 16, 2012
With Midorima shut down, the rest of Shutoku pick up the pace. Takao, who noticed Kuroko in the bathroom, is sent to cover Kuroko. He intercepts Kuroko using his "Hawk Eye" which is akin to Izuki's "Eagle Eye" but with a larger field of vision. Seirin calls a time out and decides to keep Kuroko in the game as he tries to think of a plan. Hyuga makes important shots due to his training under pressure. Midorima makes a shot from the centre line and Kagami responds with a "one man alley-oop". However, Midorima retaliates again, shooting from the end of the court. He shows his shots have no range limit, and finishing the first quarter with Shutoku in the lead, 13–19. Midorima gets permission to take every shot during the entire second quarter, pushing Shutoku's lead to 15–27. Kagami laughs, as he is getting fired up by Midorima's strength.
12	12	"What Is "Victory""; Transliteration: ""Shōri" tte nan desu ka" (Japanese: 『勝利』ってなんですか)	June 23, 2012
The second quarter ends with Shutoku still in the 27–45 lead. Kuroko watches a tape of Takao during the first half. The third quarter starts with Kuroko on the bench, and Kagami manages to barely tap one of Midorima's shots. The next time, He manages to pass Takao's screen, and touch the ball again as Midorima goes for a long shot. The shot misses, but Shutoku's Otsubo Taisuke dunks the rebound. Kagami blocks Midorima's next shot, and makes several goals, using his astounding jumping power. However, he overexerts himself and cannot jump any longer, but he is determined to win without relying on Kuroko. Third quarter ends 47–61, and Kuroko punches Kagami for saying they don't need team play right now, and Kagami calms down. Kuroko tells the team he has a plan.
13	13	"I Believed in You"; Transliteration: "Shinjitemashita" (Japanese: 信じてました)	June 30, 2012
The 4th quarter begins. Riko told Kagami he only has two more jumps left in him, and he uses the first to block Midorima as a bluff. Kuroko uses his misdirection on Takao to draw his attention to himself, then refocus Takao's sight and slip away. Kuroko then uses his fast pass that only Kagami can catch, and Kagami uses up another of his jumps to dunk past Midorima. With less than three minutes left in the game and Shutoku barely in the 76–78 lead, Shutoku calls a time-out and their coach tells them to let Midorima take the shots since Kagami is worn out. However, Seirin predicted this will happen, and the score is locked until Midorima scores 3 with 30 seconds remaining, to put Shutoku up by 5. Hyuga immediately counters with 3, and then the ball is knocked out of bounds, leading to Hyuga scoring another 3 with only 3 seconds remaining. Seirin think they have won, but Shutoku gets the ball and passes it to Midorima immediately. Kagami manages to squeeze out one more jump, but it was a pump fake, and Midorima goes to retake the shot. Kuroko, also believing Kagami would jump, knocks the ball out of Midorima's hands as he lowers it; Seirin win 82–81. After standing out in the rain, Midorima gets a call from another Member of the Generation of Miracles, Aomine, and warns him to be careful in the Championship game.
14	14	"You Look Just Like Him"; Transliteration: "Sokkuri da ne" (Japanese: そっくりだね)	July 7, 2012
At a nearby restaurant, Seirin encounter Kise, Kasamatsu, Midorima and Takao. Kuroko, Midorima, Kise and Kagami are left at the same table. Midorima warns Kagami about Aomine Daiki. As they leave the restaurant, Kuroko finds a stray dog which the team adopt and name "Tetsuya #2" due to his similarly colored eyes. Kagami, who happens to be afraid of dogs, has to sit out at practice until his legs heal. The Generation of Miracles' old manager, Momoi, visits Seirin while they are training at the pool and recounts the story of when Kuroko gave her an icypole. Momoi, whose specialty is information gathering, recognizes each of Seirin's starting players. She also goes to the same school as Aomine. Kagami is approached by Aomine who challenges him and not impressed, saying he is not strong enough to be Kuroko's "light".
15	15	"Don't Make Me Laugh"; Transliteration: "Warawasennayo" (Japanese: 笑わせんなよ)	July 14, 2012
Since he played basketball while recovering from his injury, Kagami is again suspended from practice until Seirin's first match in The Inter-High Championships which is against Touou; Aomine and Momoi's school. Kuroko tells Kagami about how Aomine was the first one of the Generation of Miracles to bloom and, having no rival, became bored of basketball and stopped coming to practices. Now, having overslept at school, Aomine promises Touou's captain that he'll make it to the game by the second half. Seirin decides to go all out early on and get a big lead so that Aomine can't catch up. However, despite calling themselves "the opening act", Touou start strong and quickly take the first goal.
16	16	"Let's Go"; Transliteration: "Yarō ka" (Japanese: やろーか)	July 21, 2012
Even without Aomine, Touou takes an early lead using Momoi's scouting information and predictions. Seirin only manage to break through using Kuroko and Kagami, both of whom Momoi can't predict. The first quarter finishes with Touou still in the lead, 25–21. The second quarter begins and Riko realises that Kagami is still injured. She subs him off the court and tapes his legs, apologising for having to use him while he's injured. As Kagami is about to re-enter the game, with 51 seconds left in the 2nd Quarter and Touou 10 points in the lead, Aomine arrives and is ready to play.
17	17	"You're All Ridiculous"; Transliteration: "Fuzaketa Yatsu Bakkari da" (Japanese: ふざけた奴ばっかりだ)	July 28, 2012
Aomine goes one-on-one against Kagami– each blocking the other's shot at the goal. During half time, Kuroko asks to stay in for the third quarter, determined to beat Aomine. Kagami reminds him to have faith in the team, and Seirin decides to bench Kuroko so he can regain some strength. Aomine returns to the court warmed up and serious, having promised his coach that he will score all of his shots in the third quarter. Although Aomine is impressed by Kagami's determination and his jump height, Aomine himself displays amazing speed and agility and he starts to use street ball techniques that easily bypass Seirin's defense.
18	18	"No!!"; Transliteration: "Iya da!!" (Japanese: 嫌だ!!)	August 4, 2012
Aomine's skills and erratic pace force Seirin to fall behind by 20 points. Kuroko is subbed back in and Seirin cuts the lead down to 15 points, but Aomine intercepts Kuroko's Ignite Pass and taunts Kuroko about not having changed or improved since middle school. Fourth quarter begins with Touou 31 points in the lead, 82–51. Having avoided using his injured leg, Kagami's other leg begins to act up from the extra stress put on it and as a result Kagami is benched for the remaining two days of the tournament. With Seirin down by 40, Kuroko's determination encourages his team mates, and they fight until the very end. However, Touou is simply too strong and Seirin loses with a scoreline of 112–55.
19	19	"On to a New Challenge"; Transliteration: "Atarashii Chōsen e" (Japanese: 新しい挑戦へ)	August 11, 2012
Back in the locker rooms, Aomine is angered by a Touou bench member badmouthing Kuroko. Kagami tells Kuroko that he does not think that they can win by just working together anymore, and Kuroko hits a slump, his passes in the next two games becoming inaccurate. Seirin loses both games, and therefore the Inter High tournament. Seirin's last chance for the year is the Winter Cup, to be held in Tokyo. With his legs finally healed, Kagami returns to practice but seems to have reverted to not relying on the team. Kuroko and he don't seem to be speaking either. Kiyoshi Teppei, the former ace and founder of the Seirin basketball team, returns from having been in hospital, and gives some words of encouragement to Kuroko and challenges Kagami to a one-on-one match to see who will play starting power forward ("ace") for Seirin in the Winter Cup.
20	20	"I Don't Want To Be"; Transliteration: "Naritai ja nē yo" (Japanese: なりたいじゃねーよ)	August 18, 2012
Kiyoshi and Kagami appear to be evenly matched despite Kiyoshi being out of practice and wearing the wrong shoes, but Kagami wins. The next day, Seirin begins the first of three consecutive days of practice matches so that each player can be evaluated and placed on a specific training regimen during the summer. Teppei has asked that the first game only use the first-years. Kagami has told Kuroko that he doesn't need to pass to him anymore, and the game is won by Kagami's strength. After the match, Kiyoshi admits he was trying to help Kuroko realize his self-imposed limits. After talking to Hyuga, Kuroko realizes that Kagami is not trying to leave him behind, but only felt like he was relying on Kuroko too much. Kuroko resolves to become stronger during the summer so that he and Kagami can form an unbreakable team during the Winter Cup.
21	21	"Let's Get Started"; Transliteration: "Hajimeru wa yo" (Japanese: 始めるわよ)	August 25, 2012
Riko announces two summer training camps to the beach and mountains to prepare for the Winter Cup qualifiers, which start right after summer vacation. Kagami teaches Riko how to make good curry. Riko gets the team to practice on the beach in the sand, meaning that they must rely on passing, and the sand will help build their leg strength. Kuroko and Kagami run into Midorima and Takao at the inn, and discover that Shutoku are also there to train. Riko changes plans so they will play practice matches against Shutoku in the evenings. Wanting to build Kagami's core strength, Riko sends him to get drinks for the team, one at a time, running on the beach instead of practicing with the others. Kuroko is attempting to develop a new technique of which Midorima is skeptical. Midorima later explains to Takao that Kuroko cannot use Misdirection while holding the ball due to the ball's presence on the court. Takao suggests that Kuroko using Misdirection while he makes a break, as an invisible dribble would be unstoppable. Kagami returns from running, having gone beyond Riko's request, and gotten drinks for Shutoku as well.
22	22	"I'll Win Even If It Kills Me"; Transliteration: "Shindemo Katsu ssu kedo" (Japanese: 死んでも勝つっスけど)	September 1, 2012
Shutoku wins all three practice matches against Seirin, but all the games were played without Kagami and the scores differ by less than ten points. Kagami learns his jumping power has dramatically improved. Midorima tells him this is only half the answer, and challenges him to a one-on-one match. Midorima wins by forcing Kagami to jump off his right foot, where he only has the ability to dunk. Kagami realizes that he must improve his ball handling in his left hand and learn to win aerial battles to beat the Generation of Miracles. Kuroko comes up with the idea to master his drive in addition to passes. The rest of the team also train hard. When the camp finishes, before heading to the station, Seirin make a detour to watch the Inter-high quarterfinal match between Touou Academy and Kaijo. Kise is determined to defeat Aomine despite never having won against him in a one-on-one match.
23	23	"Not An Adult!"; Transliteration: "Otona ja nē yo!" (Japanese: 大人じゃねーよ!)	September 8, 2012
The match between Touou and Kaijo begins with Kaijo getting the ball. Kise eventually passes Aomine, but the latter steals the ball. Touou's Sakurai scores the first 3 points. Kise copies Sakurai's three-point shot, but is easily blocked by Aomine. Kasamatsu regains the ball for Kaijo and scores a 3 pointer, and Kaijo tighten their defence. Kise then manages to stop Aomine's quick dribble and drive, and his Formless Shot. The 1st quarter ends with Kaijo leading 18–13. From the sidelines, Kuroko mentions that Aomine tends to improve as the game goes on. Touou immediately catch up in the second quarter. Kaijo calls a time out, and Kise asks his coach permission to use an unknown trump card.
24	24	"Don't Get The Wrong Idea"; Transliteration: "Kanchigai shitenja nē yo" (Japanese: カン違いしてんじゃねーよ)	September 15, 2012
Kise plans to copy Aomine's style, acknowledging that his admiration of Aomine has been preventing him from copying him. Although Kise improves his copy, Touou can widen their lead. The second quarter ending with the score 34–43. In the third quarter, Kise completes his copy, and passes Aomine's defense. Aomine attempts to block Kise's goal but instead earns his fourth foul. However, Touou still leads by 10 points. Despite Aomine's teammates' and coach's worry about his foul trouble, he successfully blocks Kise's dunk at the end of the quarter.
25	25	"Our Basketball"; Transliteration: "Ore to Omae no Basuke" (Japanese: オレとおまえのバスケ)	September 23, 2012
Aomine asks for the ball every single possession in the last quarter, with Kise and him scoring back and forth. Kise starts to get fatigued, and the strain in his legs makes him almost miss a shot. With one minute remaining, Touou is still in the 98–106 lead. With Kaijo needing a score to turn things around, Kise fakes a formless shot and attempts to pass to Kasamatsu. However, Aomine anticipates this and deflects the ball out-of-bounds. Although their final chance was lost, Kise remains determined for the sake of his team. Aomine dunks past Kise as the game ends and Touou wins by a score of 98–110. Back in the locker rooms, Touou player Shōichi Imayoshi remarks that Aomine has not shown his full capabilities yet. Kagami and Kuroko are determined more than ever to work hard to develop their style of basketball.
