= Wild Case Files =

British television series

Wild Case Files is a documentary television series that premiered in the United Kingdom in July 2006 on the National Geographic Channel.

== Plot ==
The episodes are about three different mysteries:

• In Dumbarton, Scotland, a journalist discovers a sixty-year history of dogs jumping off a bridge to their deaths.

• In Kerala, India, villagers hear a sonic boom in the morning and awake to find red rain falling from the sky, as if it is blood.

• Lions living in the Serengeti National Park in Tanzania have battles to the death with other lions.
