= Wilfred (American TV series) season 1 =

Wilfred
- Season 1
- DVD cover
- Starring: Elijah Wood; Jason Gann; Fiona Gubelmann; Dorian Brown
- No. of episodes: 13

Release
- Original network: FX
- Original release: June 23 – September 8, 2011

Season chronology
- Next → Season 2

The first season of Wilfred, premiered on FX on June 23, 2011. The season contains 13 episodes and concluded airing on September 8, 2011. The series is based on the original Australian series, Wilfred, and stars Elijah Wood, Jason Gann, Fiona Gubelmann and Dorian Brown.

== Synopsis ==
The season began with Ryan, an ex-lawyer, trying to commit suicide by overdosing on pills. His doctor sister, Kristen, knowing that giving out pills to family members is unethical, decides to give him sugar pills without him knowing. At first, he does not know and thinks that Wilfred is just a hallucination, then after a visit from his sister, he finds out about the sugar pills, therefore it is unknown exactly why only Ryan sees Wilfred the way he is. Throughout the first season Wilfred puts Ryan in difficult situations including tricking Ryan into breaking into the neighbor's house while Wilfred steals the man's marijuana plants and defecates in his boots. Ryan confesses everything to his neighbor and is assaulted, but his neighbor comes to fear him due to Wilfred’s interference. Wilfred uses Ryan's growing crush on Jenna to convince Ryan to sabotage Jenna's relationship with her long-distance boyfriend Drew.

Ryan saves Wilfred after he learns that the doggy daycare manager, who he starts leaving him with, is molesting Wilfred, and Wilfred saves a beat-up big teddy bear from the daycare. Wilfred begins having sex with this stuffed animal, with whom he communicates in the same way Ryan communicates with Wilfred. Wilfred also pressures Ryan into pursuing a sexual relationship with a tightly-wound single mother, mainly because Wilfred is infatuated with her son's stuffed giraffe. Ryan also simulates sex with the giraffe on Wilfred’s pleading until the son sees him. Wilfred also helps Ryan understand that he was not responsible for the death of his childhood dog, Sneakers, and that his sister was. The audience learns that Ryan's mentally unstable mother, Katherine, can see her cat, Mittens, in a similar fashion that Ryan sees Wilfred. Ryan discovers a man, Bruce, who claims to be able to see Wilfred the same way that Ryan sees Wilfred, and tries to convince Ryan to not trust Wilfred. After a struggle, Ryan learns that Bruce and Wilfred were playing a game to test Ryan's trust with Wilfred.

At the end of the season, Jenna accidentally ingests a marijuana-laced candy from Ryan’s house before her first time as an anchorperson and gets fired from her job, after which Ryan decides to represent her in a legal battle to get her job back. Although Ryan is used to digging up dirt on his opponents in order to win, he decides not to this time. However, Wilfred does instead and Ryan uses this evidence to get Jenna her job back.

Ryan uses his newfound "power" to break up Drew and Jenna, and gets a date with Jenna. When he finds out that she needs to take a drug test he blackmails his sister (with knowledge of a previous affair) into giving him her urine so Jenna will pass the test. This causes a wedge between Ryan and Kristen and she leaves for India. However, Kristen is pregnant, which shows up in Jenna's urine test. Jenna now believes she is pregnant so she gets back together with Drew. Wilfred gets into a car accident and gets amnesia and does not remember Ryan. The season ends with Ryan running back to his house remembering a will Wilfred was writing before the accident so Ryan would know what to do if anything happened to him. Ryan tries to open the door to his basement only to discover it is in fact a closet. A tennis ball (linking back to the first episode in the season) rolls out of the closet, leaving Ryan puzzled.

== Cast ==
=== Main cast ===
- Elijah Wood as Ryan Newman
- Jason Gann as Wilfred
- Fiona Gubelmann as Jenna Mueller (Note: Gubelmann is only credited for the episodes she appears in.)
- Dorian Brown as Kristen Newman (Note: Brown is only credited for the episodes she appears in.)

=== Special guest cast ===
- Ethan Suplee as Spencer
- Ed Helms as Darryl
- Jane Kaczmarek as Beth
- Mary Steenburgen as Catherine
- Dwight Yoakam as Bruce

=== Recurring cast ===
- Chris Klein as Drew
- J. P. Manoux as Leo
- Gerry Bednob as Mr. Patel
- Rodney To as Dr. Bangachon

=== Guest stars ===
- Charles Esten as Nick
- Ellia English as Ruby
- Damon Herriman as Jesse
- Rashida Jones as Lisa
- Nestor Carbonell as Arturo Ramos
- Rhea Perlman as Mittens
- John Michael Higgins as Dr. Cahill
- Peter Stormare as Trashface
- George Coe as Gene
- Eric Stoltz as Doug (uncredited)
- Katy Mixon as Angelique
- Ray Wise as Colt St. Cloud
- Keegan-Michael Key as Dick Barbian

== Episodes ==
No. overall	No. in season	Title	Directed by	Written by	Original release date	Prod. code	US viewers (millions)
1	1	"Happiness"	Randall Einhorn	David Zuckerman	June 23, 2011	XWL01001	2.55
After a suicide attempt, Ryan forms a unique connection with his neighbor's dog, Wilfred. Opening quote: "Sanity and happiness are an impossible combination." – Mark Twain
2	2	"Trust"	Randall Einhorn	David Zuckerman	June 30, 2011	XWL01002	2.04
Ryan betrays Wilfred's trust to gain favor with Jenna, but his deception yields an unexpected secret about her. Opening quote: "Trust thyself only, and another shall not betray thee." – Thomas Fuller
3	3	"Fear"	Randall Einhorn	Eric Weinberg	July 7, 2011	XWL01004	1.52
Ryan finally learns why Wilfred planted his wallet at the scene of the crime when Spencer comes around seeking vengeance. Opening quote: "Fear has its uses but cowardice has none." – Mahatma Gandhi
4	4	"Acceptance"	Randall Einhorn	Jason Gann	July 14, 2011	XWL01003	1.56
Ryan's efforts to reconcile with his sister cause Wilfred to have a shocking experience at doggy day care. Opening quote: "Happiness can exist only in acceptance." – George Orwell
5	5	"Respect"	Randall Einhorn	Michael Glouberman	July 21, 2011	XWL01005	1.44
Ryan and Wilfred volunteer at a hospice and discover Wilfred may have a remarkable secret talent. Opening quote: "Seek respect mainly from thyself, for it comes first from within." – Steven H. Coogler
6	6	"Conscience"	Randall Einhorn	David Baldy	July 28, 2011	XWL01006	1.74
Wilfred persuades Ryan to help him get rid of Jenna's boyfriend. Opening quote: "Conscience is the dog that can't bite, but never stops barking." – Proverb
7	7	"Pride"	Randall Einhorn	Jason Gann	August 4, 2011	XWL01007	1.40
Wilfred's pursuit of a new love interest forces Ryan to swallow his pride – among other things. Opening quote: "In general, pride is at the bottom of all great mistakes." – Steven H. Coogler
8	8	"Anger"	Victor Nelli, Jr.	Sivert Glarum & Michael Jamin	August 11, 2011	XWL01008	1.23
When Wilfred learns that Ryan feels responsible for the death of his beloved childhood dog, he goes to otherworldly lengths to help Ryan learn the truth. Opening quote: "Anger as soon as fed is dead – tis starving makes it fat." – Emily Dickinson
9	9	"Compassion"	Victor Nelli, Jr.	Patricia Breen	August 18, 2011	XWL01009	1.18
Ryan's resentment of his eccentric mother is exacerbated when Wilfred starts treating her like the mum he never had. Opening quote: "Make no judgements where you have no compassion." – Anne McCaffrey
10	10	"Isolation"	Victor Nelli, Jr.	Steve Baldikoski & Bryan Behar	August 18, 2011	XWL01010	1.04
Wilfred uses Ryan's unhealthy habit of isolating as a means to rid himself of a neighborhood pest. Opening quote: "Isolation is a self-defeating dream." – Carlos Salinas de Gortari
11	11	"Doubt"	Randall Einhorn	Reed Agnew & Eli Jorné	August 25, 2011	XWL01011	1.21
Ryan begins to suspect that his friendship with Wilfred may be self-destructive. Opening quote: "Doubt must be no more than vigilance, otherwise it can become dangerous." – George C. Lichtenberg
12	12	"Sacrifice"	Randall Einhorn	Sivert Glarum & Michael Jamin	September 1, 2011	XWL01012	1.32
Wilfred urges Ryan to sacrifice his newfound happiness for a greater good. Opening quote: "Love is a willingness to sacrifice." – Michael Novak
13	13	"Identity"	Randall Einhorn	David Zuckerman	September 8, 2011	XWL01013	0.90
Ryan ignores Wilfred's advice, creating an existential crisis for both of them. Opening quote: "The value of identity is that so often with it comes purpose." – Richard R. Grant

== Production ==
Wilfred is based on the critically acclaimed Australian series of the same name and was adapted for FX by Family Guy veteran David Zuckerman. Wilfred is produced by FX Productions while the executive producers include: Zuckerman; Rich and Paul Frank; Jeff Kwatinetz; and Joe and Ken Connor from the original Australian series. Wilfred co-creator Jason Gann and Randall Einhorn serve as co-executive producers. Einhorn directed 10 episodes of the first season and Victor Nelli, Jr. directed three. The pilot episode was filmed in summer 2010, written by Zuckerman, and directed by Einhorn. The show was shot primarily with the inexpensive Canon EOS 7D dSLR camera. The first episode of the show was included in the It's Always Sunny in Philadelphia: The Complete Season 6 DVD.
