= Wilfred (American TV series) season 2 =

Wilfred
- Season 2
- DVD cover
- Starring: Elijah Wood; Jason Gann; Fiona Gubelmann; Dorian Brown
- No. of episodes: 13

Release
- Original network: FX
- Original release: June 21 – September 20, 2012

Season chronology
- ← Previous; Season 1 Next → Season 3

The second season of Wilfred, premiered on FX on June 21, 2012. The season consisted of 13 episodes. The series is based on the original Australian series, Wilfred, and stars Elijah Wood, Jason Gann, Fiona Gubelmann and Dorian Brown.

== Synopsis ==
The second season begins 4 months after Season 1 ended, where Ryan is dreaming that he is in a mental hospital, and Wilfred is in a wheelchair. After an outburst, the doctor (Robin Williams) attempts to give Ryan electroshock therapy, having received permission from Ryan's dad. Wilfred saves Ryan, and Ryan wakes up in a meeting at his new job. He rushes out of the meeting and runs to the basement door at his house to read Wilfred's will. He removes everything from the closet and destroys the wall to reveal the basement. Wilfred's will turns out to be blank, except for the words "Keep Digging". Meanwhile, Wilfred and Drew come back from Wisconsin, unusually close, and reveal that Jenna and Drew are getting married. Wilfred tells Ryan that he is selfish, and won't listen to him, until Drew attempts to give Wilfred steroids to win a dog challenge. After Wilfred loses, Drew makes fun of him, and Ryan and Wilfred become friends again. Ryan's now-pregnant sister Kristen returns from India, and Ryan discovers a restraining order against her from Arturo Ramos, the father of her unborn child.

Ryan attempts to have a dinner party with Jenna, Drew, and his co-worker, Amanda, whom he begins dating. Amanda appears odd around Wilfred, and after Wilfred and Bear ruin the dinner party, Amanda reveals that she discovered her grandfather's two dogs consuming his deceased body, causing her fear of dogs. However, Amanda and Wilfred become close after he consoles her when she starts crying. After several weeks of dating, Ryan tells Amanda that he loves her, and they decide to move in together. After spending a night in the basement, playing a pointless game all night with Wilfred and Bruce, Ryan breaks up with Amanda, knowing that she won’t be able to accept his relationship with Wilfred. Afterwards, the company that Ryan works for loses all its investors, and his boss commits suicide. Ryan and his mother go on a road-trip, against her doctor's orders, after her cat, Mittens, passes away. After Ryan's sister shows up to retrieve them, she goes into labor, giving birth to a boy who she names Joffrey.

Jenna's career becomes a joke after her freak-out on live TV goes viral, and Wilfred finally convinces Ryan to come clean to her. Meanwhile, when Wilfred becomes jealous of the attention Jenna gives to the other neighborhood dogs, he accidentally pushes Drew's hunting shotgun over, which shoots Drew in the leg and gets his blood on Jenna’s wedding dress, days before his and Jenna's wedding, and Ryan offers to host the ceremony in his backyard for them. Ryan realizes that he is sad and misses Amanda, so he gets back together with her. At Drew and Jenna's wedding, Ryan discovers that Amanda sold the formula that the company they were working for was creating, in hopes to run off with Ryan, and that she thinks that she can communicate with Wilfred, but cannot tell Ryan what Wilfred says to him. Amanda is taken to a mental hospital, and Wilfred finds a picture that Ryan drew as child that appears to have Wilfred in the background. Wilfred claims he drew the picture, and Ryan believes him until he sees a photo of himself as a child with the drawing, which has Wilfred in the background.

== Cast ==
=== Main cast ===
- Elijah Wood as Ryan Newman
- Jason Gann as Wilfred
- Fiona Gubelmann as Jenna Mueller (Note: Gubelmann is only credited for the episodes she appears in.)
- Dorian Brown as Kristen Newman (Note: Brown is only credited for the episodes she appears in.)

=== Special guest cast ===
- Mary Steenburgen as Catherine
- Dwight Yoakam as Bruce
- Allison Mack as Amanda
- Robin Williams as himself (uncredited) / Dr. Eddy
- John Michael Higgins as Dr. Cahill
- Brad Dourif as P.T.

=== Recurring cast ===
- Chris Klein as Drew
- Rodney To as Dr. Bangachon
- Rob Riggle as Kevin
- Steven Weber as Jeremy

=== Guest stars ===
- Eugene Byrd as James
- Nestor Carbonell as Arturo
- Gil Birmingham as Red Wolf

== Episodes ==
No. overall	No. in season	Title	Directed by	Written by	Original release date	Prod. code	US viewers (millions)
14	1	"Progress"	Randall Einhorn	David Zuckerman	June 21, 2012	XWL02001	0.96
Ryan realizes the consequences of not having Wilfred in his life. Opening quote: "Discontent is the first necessity of progress." – Thomas Edison
15	2	"Letting Go"	Randall Einhorn	Reed Agnew & Eli Jorné	June 28, 2012	XWL02002	2.53
Wilfred refuses to help Ryan with his problems. Opening quote: "Some of us think holding on makes us strong, but sometimes it is letting go." – Hermann Hesse
16	3	"Dignity"	Randall Einhorn	Cody Heller & Brett Konner	July 5, 2012	XWL02003	1.45
Wilfred's popularity creates problems for Ryan. Opening quote: "Let not a man guard his dignity but let his dignity guard him." – Ralph Waldo Emerson
17	4	"Guilt"	Randall Einhorn	Steve Tompkins	July 12, 2012	XWL02004	1.35
Ryan must prevent Wilfred from waging war against an unlikely foe. Opening quote: "Guilt: the gift that keeps on giving." – Erma Bombeck
18	5	"Now"	Randall Einhorn	David Baldy	July 19, 2012	XWL02005	1.34
A traumatic experience creates unexpected consequences for Ryan and Wilfred. Opening quote: "Be here now." – Ram Dass
19	6	"Control"	Randall Einhorn	Scott Prendergast	July 26, 2012	XWL02006	1.28
Ryan's plans to introduce Amanda to Jenna are complicated by Wilfred. Opening quote: "The master understands that the universe is forever out of control." – Lao Tzu
20	7	"Avoidance"	Randall Einhorn	Jason Gann	August 2, 2012	XWL02007	0.83
Wilfred and Ryan's friendship is threatened during a sticky encounter. Opening quote: "Our biggest problems arise from the avoidance of smaller ones." – Jeremy Caulfield
21	8	"Truth"	Randall Einhorn	David Zuckerman	August 9, 2012	XWL02008	0.95
Wilfred's nemesis returns with an offer that rocks Ryan's world. Opening quote: "The truth will set you free, but first it will make you miserable." – James A. Garfield
22	9	"Service"	Randall Einhorn	Reed Agnew & Eli Jorné	August 16, 2012	XWL02009	1.05
An impromptu road trip leaves Wilfred, Ryan and his family in peril. Opening quote: "The thing that lies at the foundation of positive change is service to a fellow human being." – Lee Iacocca
23	10	"Honesty"	Randall Einhorn	Jason Gann	August 23, 2012	XWL02010	0.84
Ryan and Wilfred go to extraordinary lengths to help Jenna's career. Opening quote: "Honesty and transparency make you vulnerable. Be honest and transparent anyway." – Mother Teresa
24	11	"Questions"	Randall Einhorn	Cody Heller & Brett Konner	August 30, 2012	XWL02011	0.72
Ryan looks inward to discover the truth about Wilfred. Opening quote: "If you do not ask the right questions, you do not get the right answers." – Edward Hodnett
25	12	"Resentment"	Randall Einhorn	David Baldy	September 13, 2012	XWL02012	0.64
Wilfred sabotages Jenna and Drew's wedding on account of Ryan's jealousy. Opening quote: "Resentment is like taking poison and waiting for the other person to die." – Malachy McCourt
26	13	"Secrets"	Randall Einhorn	Story by : David Zuckerman; Teleplay by : David Zuckerman & Scott Prendergast	September 20, 2012	XWL02013	0.54
Wilfred and Ryan are confronted by shocking existential questions about life and love. Opening quote: "If we knew each other's secrets, what comfort should we find." – John Churton Collins

== Production ==
On August 6, 2011, Wilfred was renewed for a second season of 13 episodes. Season two commenced on June 21, 2012 with the season premiere labeled a special preview. On June 28, 2012, the season officially premiered following Anger Management. Prior to the official premiere date, FX released the season premiere on internet services such as Hulu, Yahoo!, FXnetworks.com and Wilfred Facebook page, for only a two-week period.
