= Wilfred (American TV series) season 3 =

Wilfred
- Season 3
- Promotional poster
- Starring: Elijah Wood; Jason Gann; Fiona Gubelmann; Dorian Brown
- No. of episodes: 13

Release
- Original network: FX
- Original release: June 20 – September 5, 2013

Season chronology
- ← Previous; Season 2 Next → Season 4

The third season of Wilfred premiered on FX on June 20, 2013. The third season consisted of 13 episodes. The series is based on the original Australian series, Wilfred, and stars Elijah Wood, Jason Gann, Fiona Gubelmann and Dorian Brown.

== Synopsis ==
As Ryan continues to experience Wilfred's various antics, new and confusing things start to be uncovered about a mysterious childhood drawing.

== Cast ==
=== Main cast ===
- Elijah Wood as Ryan Newman
- Jason Gann as Wilfred
- Fiona Gubelmann as Jenna Mueller (Note: Gubelmann is only credited for the episodes she appears in.)
- Dorian Brown as Kristen Newman (Note: Brown is only credited for the episodes she appears in.)

=== Special guest cast ===
- Mary Steenburgen as Catherine
- Dwight Yoakam as Bruce
- James Remar as Henry
- Kristen Schaal as Anne
- Angela Kinsey as Heather
- Gina Gershon as Gloria
- Barry Watson as Michael McDerry

=== Recurring cast ===
- Chris Klein as Drew
- Rodney To as Dr. Bangachon (Note: Also credited as a special guest star in "Uncertainty" in addition to having an uncredited role in "Delusion".)

=== Guest cast ===
- Jenny Mollen as Kim
- Lance Reddick as Dr. Blum
- Zachary Knighton as Bill
- George Coe as Gene
- Gerry Bednob as Mr. Patel
- Randee Heller as Margot

== Episodes ==
No. overall	No. in season	Title	Directed by	Written by	Original release date	Prod. code	US viewers (millions)
27	1	"Uncertainty"	Randall Einhorn	Reed Agnew & Eli Jorné	June 20, 2013	XWL03001	0.648
In an attempt to gain a better understanding of his origins, Ryan and Wilfred set off on a mission to find Wilfred's original owner in the hopes of getting answers to several questions that are tormenting the two friends. Opening quote: "The mistake is thinking that there can be an antidote to the uncertainty." – David Levithan
28	2	"Comfort"	Randall Einhorn	Cody Heller & Brett Konner	June 20, 2013	XWL03002	0.607
Wilfred begins to feel betrayed by Ryan when he decides to befriend the mailman, so the sensitive canine does everything he can to prove to his friend that the stranger that visits the home nearly every day is not to be trusted. Jenna and Drew return from their honeymoon. Opening quote: "Cure sometimes, treat often, comfort always." – Hippocrates
29	3	"Suspicion"	Randall Einhorn	David Baldy	June 27, 2013	XWL03003	0.705
Ryan is unable to shake off his distrust for the new man in Kristen's life, which results in a number of strange encounters between the two men as they attempt to get to know each other for the sake of the woman in their lives. Opening quote: "Suspicion is a heavy armor and with its weight it impedes more than it protects." – Robert Burns
30	4	"Sincerity"	Randall Einhorn	Jason Gann	June 27, 2013	XWL03004	0.535
In an attempt to gain the attention of a beautiful girl, Ryan decides to take Wilfred to a dog-training class, where professionals do everything they can to teach him the manners that all dogs should know. Opening quote: "Sincerity, even if it speaks with a stutter, will sound eloquent when inspired." – Eiji Yoshikawa
31	5	"Shame"	Randall Einhorn	Guy Endore-Kaiser	July 11, 2013	XWL03005	0.711
Ryan decides to take in a roommate and Wilfred willingly lends his opinion to the in-depth selection process each candidate must undergo, but they find that finding a good fit is harder than expected. Opening quote: "I have little shame, no dignity – all in the name of a better cause." – A. J. Jacobs
32	6	"Delusion"	Randall Einhorn	Elizabeth Tippet	July 18, 2013	XWL03006	0.605
Ryan begrudgingly agrees to team up with Wilfred to find a worthy birthday present for Jenna, which results in the two delving into questionable territory to ensure they get her the best possible gift. Opening quote: "Truth may sometimes hurt, but delusion harms." – Vanna Bonta
33	7	"Intuition"	Randall Einhorn	David Zuckerman	July 25, 2013	XWL03007	0.542
With a forceful push from Wilfred, Ryan goes on a sudden crime-fighting spree around town due to a fit of sleeplessness that has him making drastic decisions that put his safety and questionable sanity in extreme jeopardy. Opening quote: "Intuition is more important to discovery than logic" – Henri Poincaré
34	8	"Perspective"	Randall Einhorn	Kevin Arrieta	August 1, 2013	XWL03008	0.470
Ryan decides to turn to progressive psychotherapy to better understand a past trauma that has haunted him his entire life, but he finds that the revolutionary new method is not quite what he hoped for. Opening quote: "How weird it was to drive streets I knew so well. What a different perspective" – Suzanne Vega
35	9	"Confrontation"	Randall Einhorn	David Baldy	August 8, 2013	XWL03009	0.462
Wilfred crashes the family Christmas party that Kristen planned and pits Ryan against his family. Opening quote: "There can be no progress without head-on confrontation." – Christopher Hitchens
36	10	"Distance"	Randall Einhorn	Jacob Young	August 15, 2013	XWL03010	0.649
Ryan, Wilfred, and Bruce struggle to outwit each other. Opening quote: "Sometimes it's necessary to go a long distance out of the way to come back a short distance correctly." – Edward Albee
37	11	"Stagnation"	Randall Einhorn	Jason Gann	August 22, 2013	XWL03011	0.411
Wilfred pursues a forbidden love. Opening quote: "Stagnation is death. If you don't change, you die. It's that simple. It's that scary."- Leonard Sweet
38	12	"Heroism"	Randall Einhorn	Cody Heller & Brett Konner	August 29, 2013	XWL03012	0.835
Ryan is put in danger as Wilfred pursues the path to valor. Opening quote: "In my opinion, actual heroism, like actual love, is a messy, painful, vulnerable business." – John Green
39	13	"Regrets"	Randall Einhorn	Reed Agnew & Eli Jorné	September 5, 2013	XWL03013	0.443
Jenna forbids Ryan from seeing Wilfred when he needs him most. Opening quote: "Maybe all one can do is hope to end up with the right regrets." – Arthur Miller

== Production ==
On October 31, 2012 Wilfred was renewed for a third season of 13 episodes. Reed Agnew and Eli Jorné took over as executive producers and day-to-day showrunners. Despite stepping down as showrunner, creator David Zuckerman stayed on as an executive producer. Filming began on March 11, 2013. This season premiered on June 20, 2013 with back-to-back episodes for two weeks, then returned to its regular half-hour slot on July 11 after the July 4 hiatus.
