= Wilfred (American TV series) season 4 =

Wilfred
- Season 4
- Promotional poster
- Starring: Elijah Wood; Jason Gann; Fiona Gubelmann; Dorian Brown
- No. of episodes: 10

Release
- Original network: FX
- Original release: June 25 – August 13, 2014

Season chronology
- ← Previous; Season 3

The fourth and final season of Wilfred, premiered on FX on June 25, 2014. The fourth season consisted of 10 episodes. The series is based on the original Australian series, Wilfred, and stars Elijah Wood, Jason Gann, Fiona Gubelmann and Dorian Brown.

== Synopsis ==
In the fourth and final season of Wilfred, Ryan tries to figure out the truth behind "The Flock of the Grey Shepard".

== Cast ==
=== Main cast ===
- Elijah Wood as Ryan Newman
- Jason Gann as Wilfred
- Fiona Gubelmann as Jenna Mueller (Note: Gubelmann is only credited for the episodes she appears in.)
- Dorian Brown as Kristen Newman (Note: Brown is only credited for the episodes she appears in.)

=== Special guest cast ===
- James Remar as Henry
- Tobin Bell as Charles
- Mimi Rogers as Catherine
- Rutger Hauer as Dr. Grummons
- Allison Mack as Amanda
- William Baldwin as Bruce
- John Michael Higgins as Dr. Cahill

=== Recurring cast ===
- Chris Klein as Drew
- Rodney To as Dr. Bangachon
- Harriet Sansom Harris as Lonnie Goldsmith

=== Guest stars ===
- Julie Hagerty as Genevieve
- Nestor Carbonell as Arturo Ramos
- Randee Heller as Margot

== Episodes ==
| No. overall | No. in season | Title | Directed by | Written by | Original release date | Prod. code | US viewers (millions) |
|---|---|---|---|---|---|---|---|
| 40 | 1 | "Amends" | Randall Einhorn | Reed Agnew & Eli Jorné | June 25, 2014 | XWL04001 | 0.242 |
With his world in disarray, Ryan has a second chance to make things right. Opening quote: "If you have behaved badly, repent, make what amends you can and address yourself to the task of behaving better next time." – Aldous Huxley
| 41 | 2 | "Consequences" | Randall Einhorn | David Baldy | June 25, 2014 | XWL04002 | 0.242 |
Ryan and Wilfred's camping takes a sudden turn when an unexpected guest joins them. Opening quote: "Sooner or later everyone sits down to a banquet of consequences." – Robert Louis Stevenson
| 42 | 3 | "Loyalty" | Randall Einhorn | Keith Heisler | July 2, 2014 | XWL04003 | n/a |
Kristen's custody battle has Ryan and Wilfred taking sides. Opening quote: "We are all in the same boat, in a stormy sea, and we owe each other a terrible loyalty." – G. K. Chesterton
| 43 | 4 | "Answers" | Randall Einhorn | Matt Patterson | July 9, 2014 | XWL04004 | 0.201* |
Wilfred is the subject of a scientific study; the results are disconcerting. Opening quote: "In our quest for the answers of life we tend to make order out of chaos, and chaos out of order." – Jeffrey Fry
| 44 | 5 | "Forward" | Randall Einhorn | Reed Agnew & Eli Jorné | July 16, 2014 | XWL04005 | n/a |
After enduring a troubling incident, Ryan and Wilfred have radically different explanations for the event. Opening quote: "There are many ways of going forward, but only one way of standing still." – Franklin D. Roosevelt
| 45 | 6 | "Patterns" | Randall Einhorn | Ted Travelstead | July 23, 2014 | XWL04006 | n/a |
Ryan finds himself ensnared by the "End Game". Opening quote: "Truth is outside of all patterns." – Bruce Lee
| 46 | 7 | "Responsibility" | Randall Einhorn | Jack Kukoda | July 30, 2014 | XWL04007 | 0.198 |
While Ryan helps his mother as she adapts her new life, Wilfred confronts a new enemy. Opening quote: "By imposing too great a responsibility, or rather, all responsibility, on yourself, you crush yourself." – Franz Kafka
| 47 | 8 | "Courage" | Randall Einhorn | David Baldy | August 6, 2014 | XWL04008 | 0.170 |
Wilfred tries to convince Ryan to keep sensitive information from Jenna; Ryan is persuaded. Opening quote: "How few there are who have courage enough to own their faults, or resolution enough to mend them." – Benjamin Franklin
| 48 | 9 | "Resistance" | Randall Einhorn | David Zuckerman | August 13, 2014 | XWL04009 | 0.239 |
Ryan's hope is threatened as he faces seemingly unending challenges. Opening quote: "Resistance is useless." – Doctor Who
| 49 | 10 | "Happiness" | Randall Einhorn | David Zuckerman | August 13, 2014 | XWL04010 | 0.247 |
The truth about Wilfred is finally revealed. Opening quote: "Happiness does not depend on outward things, but on the way we see them." – Leo Tolstoy

- A * indicates that the individual episode ratings were unavailable, so the FXX primetime average is listed instead.

== Production ==
On October 2, 2013, Wilfred was renewed for a ten-episode fourth and final season. The series moved to FX's sister network FXX with first two episodes back-to-back on June 25, 2014, and the final two episodes aired on August 13. David Zuckerman, who served as showrunner for the first two seasons, returned as co-showrunner after stepping down in season 3. The roles of Catherine and Bruce had to be recast after Mary Steenburgen and Dwight Yoakam were unable to reprise their respective roles due to scheduling conflict, and they were replaced by Mimi Rogers and William Baldwin.

The crew was given warning well ahead of time so the show's creators could tie up loose ends with the final season. The decision to end the series was ultimately made by FX. Jason Gann was intent on continuing the series stating, "We would have kept going. I think you would have to be crazy to quit a job like this." The return of show runner David Zuckerman, coupled with the focus on answering some of the show's deeper mythological questions, prevented Gann from writing any episodes in the final season.

Elijah Wood has stated that "Answers" is one of his favorite episodes of the series saying "I read the season kind of in order and I read like one through three and then I read four and it just totally blew my mind." His friend has taken the basement set and recreated it at his house. Wood himself has possession of a stuffed bear and a bong made from a Gatorade bottle, both featured prominently throughout the series.
