= List of Wilfred (American TV series) episodes =

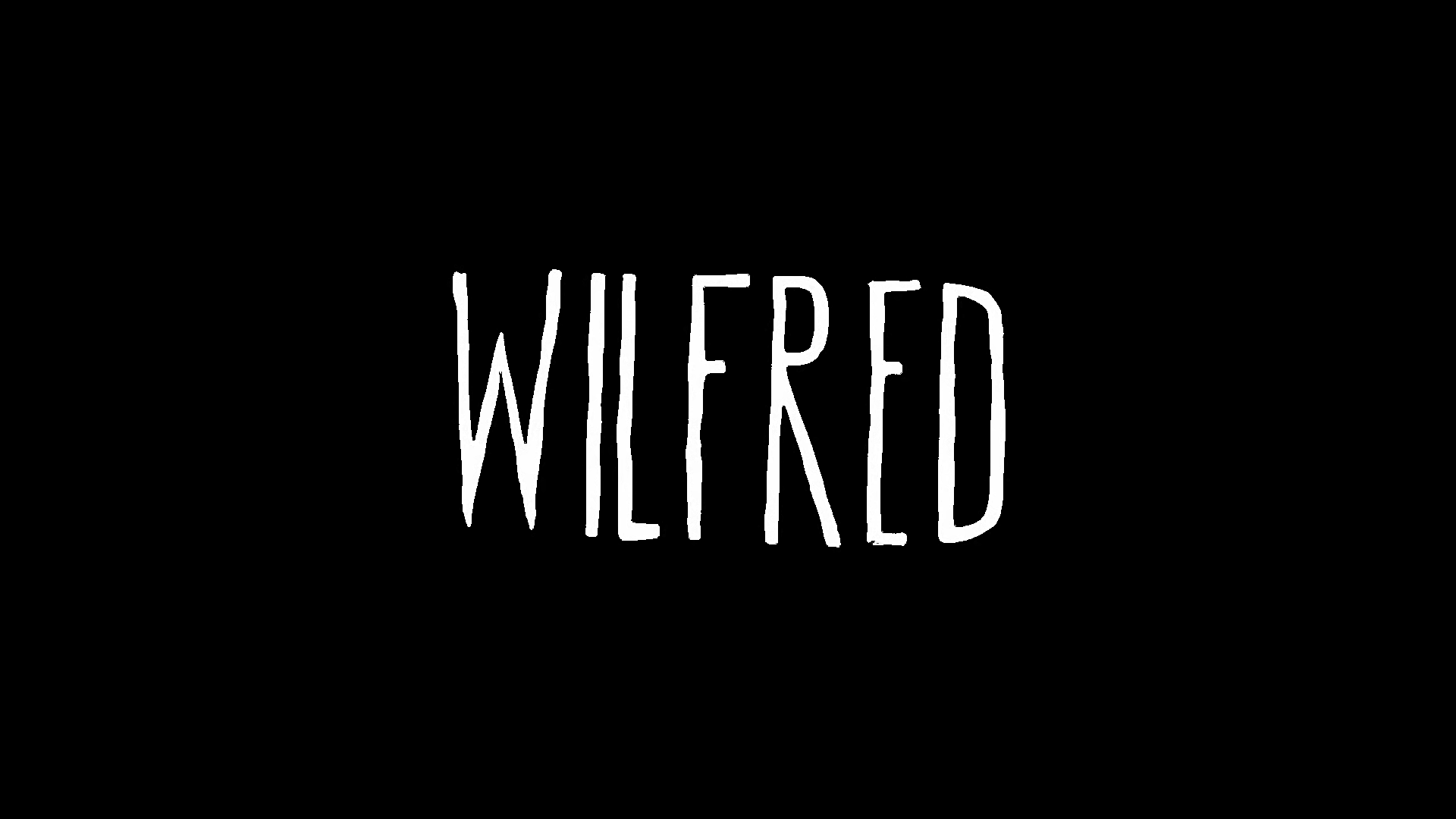

Wilfred is an American comedy television series that premiered on FX on June 23, 2011. Based on the original Australian series, Wilfred, which aired a total of 16 episodes on SBS One, the series stars Elijah Wood as Ryan, along with series co-creator Jason Gann, reprising his eponymous role of Wilfred.

Each episode of the series typically revolves around Wilfred helping Ryan to some achievement, the object of which serves as the title of the episode. For example, the first three episodes of the series are titled "Happiness", "Trust", and "Fear". Each also opens with a quote concerning the title, after which every word but the title disappears.

The series moved to FX's sister channel FXX for its fourth and final season in 2014. A total of 49 episodes of Wilfred were aired over the course of four seasons, between June 23, 2011, and August 13, 2014.

== Series overview ==
Season	Episodes	Originally released	
Season	Episodes	First released	Last released
1	13	June 23, 2011	September 8, 2011
2	13	June 21, 2012	September 20, 2012
3	13	June 20, 2013	September 5, 2013
4	10	June 25, 2014	August 13, 2014

== Episodes ==
=== Season 1 (2011) ===
No. overall	No. in season	Title	Directed by	Written by	Original release date	Prod. code	US viewers (millions)
1	1	"Happiness"	Randall Einhorn	David Zuckerman	June 23, 2011	XWL01001	2.55
2	2	"Trust"	Randall Einhorn	David Zuckerman	June 30, 2011	XWL01002	2.04
3	3	"Fear"	Randall Einhorn	Eric Weinberg	July 7, 2011	XWL01004	1.52
4	4	"Acceptance"	Randall Einhorn	Jason Gann	July 14, 2011	XWL01003	1.56
5	5	"Respect"	Randall Einhorn	Michael Glouberman	July 21, 2011	XWL01005	1.44
6	6	"Conscience"	Randall Einhorn	David Baldy	July 28, 2011	XWL01006	1.74
7	7	"Pride"	Randall Einhorn	Jason Gann	August 4, 2011	XWL01007	1.40
8	8	"Anger"	Victor Nelli, Jr.	Sivert Glarum & Michael Jamin	August 11, 2011	XWL01008	1.23
9	9	"Compassion"	Victor Nelli, Jr.	Patricia Breen	August 18, 2011	XWL01009	1.18
10	10	"Isolation"	Victor Nelli, Jr.	Steve Baldikoski & Bryan Behar	August 18, 2011	XWL01010	1.04
11	11	"Doubt"	Randall Einhorn	Reed Agnew & Eli Jorné	August 25, 2011	XWL01011	1.21
12	12	"Sacrifice"	Randall Einhorn	Sivert Glarum & Michael Jamin	September 1, 2011	XWL01012	1.32
13	13	"Identity"	Randall Einhorn	David Zuckerman	September 8, 2011	XWL01013	0.90

=== Season 2 (2012) ===
No. overall	No. in season	Title	Directed by	Written by	Original release date	Prod. code	US viewers (millions)
14	1	"Progress"	Randall Einhorn	David Zuckerman	June 21, 2012	XWL02001	0.96
15	2	"Letting Go"	Randall Einhorn	Reed Agnew & Eli Jorné	June 28, 2012	XWL02002	2.53
16	3	"Dignity"	Randall Einhorn	Cody Heller & Brett Konner	July 5, 2012	XWL02003	1.45
17	4	"Guilt"	Randall Einhorn	Steve Tompkins	July 12, 2012	XWL02004	1.35
18	5	"Now"	Randall Einhorn	David Baldy	July 19, 2012	XWL02005	1.34
19	6	"Control"	Randall Einhorn	Scott Prendergast	July 26, 2012	XWL02006	1.28
20	7	"Avoidance"	Randall Einhorn	Jason Gann	August 2, 2012	XWL02007	0.83
21	8	"Truth"	Randall Einhorn	David Zuckerman	August 9, 2012	XWL02008	0.95
22	9	"Service"	Randall Einhorn	Reed Agnew & Eli Jorné	August 16, 2012	XWL02009	1.05
23	10	"Honesty"	Randall Einhorn	Jason Gann	August 23, 2012	XWL02010	0.84
24	11	"Questions"	Randall Einhorn	Cody Heller & Brett Konner	August 30, 2012	XWL02011	0.72
25	12	"Resentment"	Randall Einhorn	David Baldy	September 13, 2012	XWL02012	0.64
26	13	"Secrets"	Randall Einhorn	Story by : David Zuckerman; Teleplay by : David Zuckerman & Scott Prendergast	September 20, 2012	XWL02013	0.54

=== Season 3 (2013) ===
No. overall	No. in season	Title	Directed by	Written by	Original release date	Prod. code	US viewers (millions)
27	1	"Uncertainty"	Randall Einhorn	Reed Agnew & Eli Jorné	June 20, 2013	XWL03001	0.648
28	2	"Comfort"	Randall Einhorn	Cody Heller & Brett Konner	June 20, 2013	XWL03002	0.607
29	3	"Suspicion"	Randall Einhorn	David Baldy	June 27, 2013	XWL03003	0.705
30	4	"Sincerity"	Randall Einhorn	Jason Gann	June 27, 2013	XWL03004	0.535
31	5	"Shame"	Randall Einhorn	Guy Endore-Kaiser	July 11, 2013	XWL03005	0.711
32	6	"Delusion"	Randall Einhorn	Elizabeth Tippet	July 18, 2013	XWL03006	0.605
33	7	"Intuition"	Randall Einhorn	David Zuckerman	July 25, 2013	XWL03007	0.542
34	8	"Perspective"	Randall Einhorn	Kevin Arrieta	August 1, 2013	XWL03008	0.470
35	9	"Confrontation"	Randall Einhorn	David Baldy	August 8, 2013	XWL03009	0.462
36	10	"Distance"	Randall Einhorn	Jacob Young	August 15, 2013	XWL03010	0.649
37	11	"Stagnation"	Randall Einhorn	Jason Gann	August 22, 2013	XWL03011	0.411
38	12	"Heroism"	Randall Einhorn	Cody Heller & Brett Konner	August 29, 2013	XWL03012	0.835
39	13	"Regrets"	Randall Einhorn	Reed Agnew & Eli Jorné	September 5, 2013	XWL03013	0.443

=== Season 4 (2014) ===
No. overall	No. in season	Title	Directed by	Written by	Original release date	Prod. code	US viewers (millions)
40	1	"Amends"	Randall Einhorn	Reed Agnew & Eli Jorné	June 25, 2014	XWL04001	0.242
41	2	"Consequences"	Randall Einhorn	David Baldy	June 25, 2014	XWL04002	0.242
42	3	"Loyalty"	Randall Einhorn	Keith Heisler	July 2, 2014	XWL04003	n/a
43	4	"Answers"	Randall Einhorn	Matt Patterson	July 9, 2014	XWL04004	0.201*
44	5	"Forward"	Randall Einhorn	Reed Agnew & Eli Jorné	July 16, 2014	XWL04005	n/a
45	6	"Patterns"	Randall Einhorn	Ted Travelstead	July 23, 2014	XWL04006	n/a
46	7	"Responsibility"	Randall Einhorn	Jack Kukoda	July 30, 2014	XWL04007	0.198
47	8	"Courage"	Randall Einhorn	David Baldy	August 6, 2014	XWL04008	0.170
48	9	"Resistance"	Randall Einhorn	David Zuckerman	August 13, 2014	XWL04009	0.239
49	10	"Happiness"	Randall Einhorn	David Zuckerman	August 13, 2014	XWL04010	0.247

- A * indicates that the individual episode ratings were unavailable, so the FXX primetime average is listed instead.
