= Ellie Kanner =

American film director

- Other name: Ellie Kanner-Zuckerman
- Occupations: Film director, television director, former casting director
- Years active: 1991–present
- Spouse(s): David Zuckerman (divorced)
- Children: 2

Ellie Kanner, sometimes credited as Ellie Kanner-Zuckerman, is an American film and television director and former casting director.

== Career ==
Kanner grew up in Bloomfield, Connecticut. From a young age, she wanted to move to Los Angeles and pursue a career in entertainment. She is Jewish.

She attended Southern Connecticut State University before transferring to Pasadena City College. She dropped out of school and was hired as an agent by Irvin Arthur Associates, a talent agency that represented Ellen DeGeneres, Marsha Warfield, Shelley Berman and Dick Shawn. She soon left the company to become a casting director and cast the pilot episodes of The Drew Carey Show, Sabrina, the Teenage Witch, Two Guys and a Girl, Sex and the City and Friends. She won a Casting Society of America award for her work on Friends.

Kanner's other television casting credits include Lois & Clark: The New Adventures of Superman, The Great War and the Shaping of the 20th Century, Clueless, Time Trax, Special Unit 2 and The Dead Zone. She also cast the films High Strung (1991), Sleep with Me (1994), Kicking and Screaming (1995), MVP: Most Valuable Primate (2000) and Air Bud: World Pup.

In 2001 Kanner directed her first film, entitled Rachel's Room. It featured Maggie Grace's first major role and Liz Tigelaar's first screenplay credit. Her next film, Italian Ties (2001), starred Scott Baio and Meat Loaf. Other film directing credits include Crazylove (2005) starring Reiko Aylesworth and Bruno Campos, Wake (2009) starring Bijou Phillips and Ian Somerhalder, For the Love of Money (2012) with Edward Furlong and James Caan, and Authors Anonymous (2014) starring Kaley Cuoco, Dylan Walsh, Chris Klein, and Dennis Farina.

She has directed television episodes of The Division, The Dead Zone, Boston Legal, Greek and Wildfire.

== Personal life ==
Kanner was married to television producer and writer David Zuckerman and is currently a single mom to their two sons, Zachary and Adam. She belongs to the Kehillat Israel Reconstructionist Congregation of Pacific Palisades.
