= Ryan Kahn =

American television presenter (born 1977)

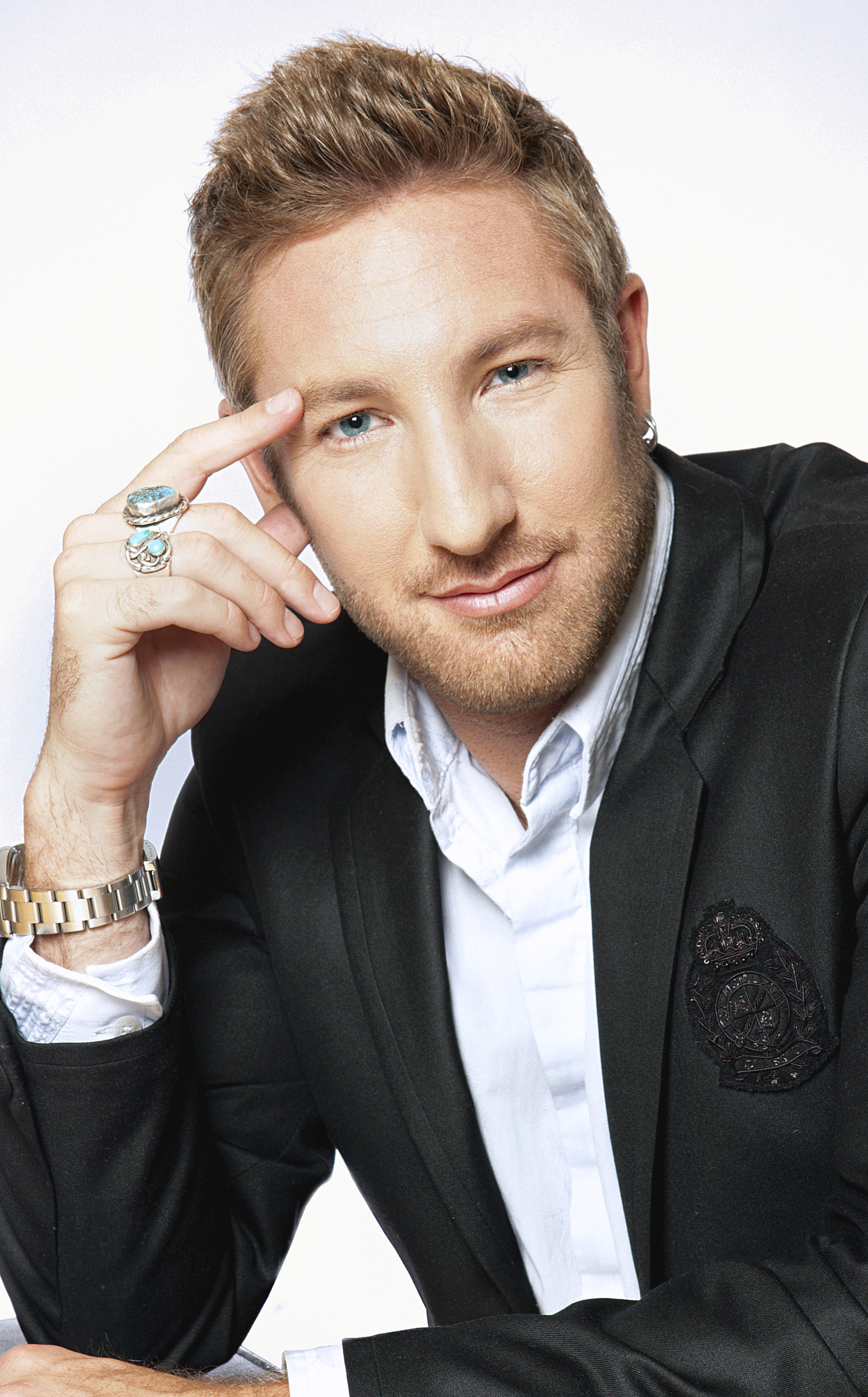
- Ryan Kahn Career Coach
- Born: Ryan Kahn; November 10, 1977 (age 48); Newport Beach, California, United States
- Presenting career
- Show: Hired
- Network: MTV
- Country: United States

Ryan Kahn (born November 10, 1977), known as Career Coach, is an American television personality. Ryan Kahn is founder of The Hired Group, star of the show Hired on MTV Networks, and author of the book Hired!

== Early life ==
Kahn is a Southern California native that graduated with an undergraduate degree from California Polytechnic State University, San Luis Obispo. He continued his education with a focus degree in Music Business from UCLA’s Entertainment Studies program.

== Career ==
While attending UCLA, Ryan interned for The Firm, Inc., DC Management, and then Warner Music Group, where he was hired.

He has been a guest speaker in UCLA and USC’s entertainment courses to discuss "How to Break into the Entertainment Business".

Currently Ryan applies his experience as Career Coach and founder of The Hired Group.

== Personal life ==
Ryan plays bass and steel drum in the Newport Beach-based band, COASTAL. He also founded Rock Start, a charity that donates musical instruments to children in need.

== Filmography ==
- MTV's Hired

== Discography ==
- COASTAL, Vacation Day, bass, steel drum, and vocals (2024)
- The Night Riders, My Favorite Color is Blonde, lead bass and vocals (2010)
- Elevation, Mystery of Sound, lead bass and vocals (2004)
- Surefire, Self Titled, lead bass and vocals (2001)
- Chewbacca and Friends, Self Titled, lead guitar (1996)

== Charity work ==
Founder of Rock Start (2009)

== Published works ==
- How to get Hired
- Hired! The Guide for the Recent Grad
