= Sandy Gallin =

American talent manager and producer (1940–2017)

- Born: Albert Samuel Gallin; May 27, 1940; New York City, U.S.
- Died: April 21, 2017 (aged 76); Los Angeles, California, U.S.
- Education: Boston University
- Occupation: Talent manager
- Spouse: Bryan Fox (m. 2014)

Albert Samuel Gallin, better known as Sandy Gallin (May 27, 1940 – April 21, 2017), was an American talent manager and producer, winner of an Emmy Award.

== Early life and education ==
Gallin was born on May 27, 1940, in New York, the son of middle-class Jewish parents. Gallin graduated from Boston University in 1962.

== Career ==
Gallin joined the mailroom of General Artists Corporation and eventually became a senior vice president and board member. After less than a year at GAC, he became a junior agent. During this time he played a role in booking The Beatles on The Ed Sullivan Show.

In 1970, he left GAC and partnered with his cousin, Raymond Katz, to create the personal management company Katz Gallin, which lasted fourteen years. One of his early clients was country music crossover artist Mac Davis, who introduced him to Dolly Parton. He served as her personal manager for the next twenty-five years, and also went on to manage the careers of Cher, Michael Jackson, Neil Diamond, Barbra Streisand, Mariah Carey,,Whoopi Goldberg, Andrew Dice Clay, as well as Andy Cohen.

Gallin produced over twenty movies as well as Broadway plays, with Dolly Parton as co-owner of the film and television production company Sandollar Productions, and was the chief executive officer of Mirage Entertainment and Sports. He was a close associate of Steve Wynn, Barry Diller, David Geffen, Diane Von Furstenberg, and Calvin Klein.

He formed Gallin-Morey Associates with Jim Morey.

=== Sexual harassment claims ===
In 1997, Gallin was sued by two former employees, Jeff Kwatinetz and Michael Green who had left Gallin-Morey associates to form their own management company The Firm, alleging sexual harassment. The lawsuit alleged Gallin asked them to coordinate sexual visits with men, as well as to offer their sexual services to potential clients to secure relationships. Gallin responded with a countersuit for $1 million alleging his former employees had breached their contractual obligations with his firm and produced the sexual harassment allegations by way of distraction from their violations.

== Personal life ==
Gallin was diagnosed with cancer in 1988. After surviving the diagnosis, Gallin added laying tefillin, wearing a prayer shawl and wearing a kippah to his morning routine, which he described as an expression of gratitude to God.

On April 21, 2017, Gallin died following a long battle with multiple myeloma. He was 76.
