= Authors Anonymous =

2014 comedy indie film directed by Ellie Kanner

- Film poster
- Directed by: Ellie Kanner
- Written by: David Congalton
- Produced by: Ellie Kanner; Hal Schwartz
- Starring: Kaley Cuoco; Chris Klein; Dennis Farina; Jonathan Bennett; Tricia Helfer; Jonathan Banks; Dylan Walsh; Teri Polo
- Cinematography: Tobias Datum
- Edited by: Stephen Myers
- Music by: Jeff Cardoni
- Production companies: Lainie Productions; Bull Market Entertainment; Forever Sunny Productions
- Distributed by: Screen Media Films; Starz Digital
- Release date: April 18, 2014 (U.S.)
- Running time: 92 minutes
- Country: United States
- Language: English

Authors Anonymous is a 2014 American comedy film directed and produced by Ellie Kanner. It stars Kaley Cuoco, Chris Klein, Tricia Helfer, Jonathan Banks, Jonathan Bennett, Teri Polo, Dylan Walsh, and Dennis Farina. The film was released on March 18, 2014, through video on demand prior to its limited release on April 18, 2014, by Screen Media Films and Starz Digital. Authors Anonymous was panned by critics.

== Plot summary ==
When several dysfunctional and unpublished writers accept young Hannah into their clique, they don't expect her overnight success.

Hannah, who has rarely even read a book, let alone written one, not only manages to land a literary agent to represent her, she cashes in on a deal to turn her first manuscript into a Hollywood film. The support of her weekly writers group, Authors Anonymous, turns to resentment.

Colette Mooney receives rejection letters galore from agents and publishers. Her husband, optician Alan, speaks ideas into a hand-held recorder all day long, but never acts on them. Henry Obert has writer's block, as well as a huge crush on Hannah, while a Tom Clancy wanna-be, John K. Butzin, resorts to self-publishing in a delusional quest to become a best-selling author, helped by a young hardware store employee named Sigrid who believes in him.

In time, Hannah realizes that maintaining a relationship with these people is next to impossible, but does what she can to at least encourage Henry to begin writing again.

== Cast ==
- Kaley Cuoco as Hannah Rinaldi
- Chris Klein as Henry Obert
- Tricia Helfer as Sigrid Hagenguth
- Jonathan Banks as David Kelleher
- Jonathan Bennett as William Bruce
- Teri Polo as Colette Mooney
- Dennis Farina as John K. Butzin
- Dylan Walsh as Alan Mooney
- Charlene Amoia as Eudora
- Meagen Fay as Maureen
- Robb Skyler as Dr. Xiroman
- Diane Robin as Lois Pepper

== Production ==
=== Pre-production ===
The film is produced by director Ellie Kanner's Forever Sunny Productions (EKZ Productions) and Hal Schwartz's Bull Market Entertainment in association with Cynthia and Laine Guidry's Lainie Productions. Jonathan Bennett and Kaley Cuoco also served as executive producers to the film.

=== Filming ===
The film was shot in and around Los Angeles during August 2012. It includes one of Dennis Farina's last performances before his death in July 2013.

== Reception ==
On the review aggregator website Rotten Tomatoes, 8% of 13 critics' reviews are positive, with an average rating of 2.9/10. Metacritic, which uses a weighted average, assigned the film a score of 16 out of 100, based on 8 critics, indicating "overwhelming dislike".
