= National Security (2003 film) =

2003 film by Dennis Dugan

- Theatrical release poster
- Directed by: Dennis Dugan
- Written by: Jay Scherick; David Ronn
- Produced by: Bobby Newmyer; Jeff Silver; Michael Green
- Starring: Martin Lawrence; Steve Zahn; Colm Feore; Bill Duke; Eric Roberts
- Cinematography: Oliver Wood
- Edited by: Debra Neil-Fisher
- Music by: Randy Edelman
- Production companies: Columbia Pictures; Outlaw Productions; Intermedia Films; Firm Films
- Distributed by: Sony Pictures Releasing
- Release date: January 17, 2003
- Running time: 88 minutes
- Country: United States
- Language: English
- Budget: $30 million
- Box office: $54.6 million

National Security is a 2003 American buddy cop action comedy film directed by Dennis Dugan, and starring Martin Lawrence and Steve Zahn as two mismatched security guards who are thrown together to bust a smuggling operation. The supporting cast includes Bill Duke, Eric Roberts, Colm Feore, and Matt McCoy. It was shot at various locations in Greater Los Angeles, including Long Beach and Santa Clarita.

The film was released by Sony Pictures Releasing on January 17, 2003, received negative reviews from critics, and grossed $54.6 million worldwide against a total budget of $30 million at the box office.

== Plot ==
As LAPD policemen Hank Rafferty and Charlie Reed investigate a warehouse heist by a gang of thieves, Charlie is killed before the thieves escape. Meanwhile, Earl Montgomery's lifelong dream to become a police officer is thwarted when he flunks police academy for accidentally causing an explosion.

Frustrated that Detective Frank McDuff won't allow Hank to aid in the investigation of Charlie's death, he sees Earl trying to get into his car after locking his keys inside. When Hank questions him, Earl race-baits and insults him until he tries to arrest him. A bumblebee comes along, to which Earl is allergic, causing him to panic. From afar, it seems that Hank is brutalizing Earl when he is actually shooing the bee away with his baton; a man catches the incident on video, which Earl spitefully lies about. Hank is fired from the police force and sentenced to six months in prison for assault.

After his release, Hank takes a job as a security guard and continues investigating Charlie's death. Noticing an alarm being tripped at a soda warehouse, Hank goes to investigate. Earl, who works for the same security company, is on duty at the warehouse but is slacking off. Hank interrupts the heist, and a gunfight erupts, during which Hank and Earl cross paths again. They give chase but are stopped for speeding.

One of the thieves drops a cell phone, which leads them to a semi-trailer truck. Inside it, Hank and Earl find the thieves' van. Earl tries to hotwire the van but accidentally triggers the alarm, alerting the thieves. After a brief shootout, Hank and Earl escape by driving the van out of the truck and off the edge of the Vincent Thomas Bridge.

The van contains seemingly ordinary beer kegs; however, at a foundry, they discover they are actually made of an atomic aerospace alloy worth millions. They hide the van and the kegs in Hank's ex-girlfriend Denise's garage. As they broke up when Hank was convicted, Hank asks Earl to tell Denise the truth about the "assault". Earl promises, but when he sees she is an attractive black woman, he instead hits on her, playing the victim again. This causes another fight between them, and Denise kicks them both out of her house.

After a heated argument, Hank punches Earl in the face before storming off. Later, the pair is cornered by police, as they are suspects in the earlier shootout. They escape, as Earl manages to punch Hank back in retaliation, and Hank realizes the thieves must have a mole in the police department.

That night, the pair trace the van's owner's address and stake it out, but Earl rushes inside on his own and is confronted by the thieves. Hank arrives just as Earl is shot in the leg, and before they escape, he recognizes one of the thieves, Nash, as Charlie's murderer. When Hank takes Earl to Denise to get his wound treated (which is just a graze), a bee flies in and Earl freaks out, making Denise realize that Hank's story about the "assault" on Earl was actually true. She slaps Earl for lying and reconciles with Hank.

Based on something overheard from Nash, they follow him to a meeting at a yacht club and witness him talking to McDuff, his inside man. Hank and Earl tell Hank's former boss, Lieutenant Washington, everything they know and then pretend to approach McDuff, offering to sell him back the "beer kegs" for $1 million. However, Nash learns about their plans and takes Washington hostage first.

During the confrontation the next day, the pair meet with McDuff, Nash, and their men near the coast. Hank and Earl rescue Washington, but accidentally start yet another gunfight with Nash's gang; the trio manage to apprehend or kill most of the thugs, including McDuff. Hank is shot, but survives and kills Nash by catapulting him into the ocean with a crane's lifting hook, finally avenging Charlie's death.

Six months later, in honor of their heroic actions, Hank is reinstated in the LAPD while Earl is admitted to the force. Now officially partners, they encounter a situation similar to how they met, in which a man is apparently locked out of his car. Earl helps him but discovers he is actually a thief. He successfully stops him by shooting at the car, but the vehicle explodes soon after.

== Cast ==
- Martin Lawrence as Earl Montgomery
- Steve Zahn as Hank Rafferty
- Colm Feore as Detective Frank McDuff
- Bill Duke as Lieutenant Washington
- Eric Roberts as Nash
- Timothy Busfield as Charlie Reed
- Robinne Lee as Denise
- Matt McCoy as District Attorney Robert Barton
- Brett Cullen as Heston
- Mari Morrow as Lola
- Stephen Tobolowsky as Billy Narthax
- Margaret Travolta as Judge
- Noel Gugliemi as Latino Convict
- Jonathan Loughran as Sarcastic Cop
- Leslie Jones as Britney, Trucker Woman
- Hal Fishman as himself
- Jeff Ross as Security Guard
- Joe Flaherty as Owen Fergus
- Martin Klebba as Security Guard (uncredited)

== Music ==
The main songs are:

- "Silly" - The Warden
- "One of These Days" - Wu-Tang Clan
- "95 South" - Cool Ade
- "All Good? - De La Soul
- "N.S.E.W." - Disturbing tha Peace
- Fruko y Sus Tesos ("El Preso")
- Graveyard Soldjas ("Don't Start None")
- Petey Pablo ("Blow Your Whistle")
- Tracy ("One More Try")
- Barry White ("Can't Get Enough of Your Love Babe")
- Fingaz ("Baby")
- 95 South ("Cool Ade (Extended Mix)")
- Lil' O ("Ay Yo")
- Bathgate ("Bump That")
- Damian Valentine ("Revolution")

== Production ==
In April 1998, it was reported that Robert Newmyer's Outlaw Productions had formed a multi-film co-production agreement with Intermedia and Fuji Television. Action comedy script National Security from Spin City writers Jay Scherick and David Ronn was announced to be the first production of this agreement. In January 2000, National Security was being developed as a potential vehicle for Jamie Foxx. By October 2000, the film was set up at Columbia Pictures after Warner Bros. Pictures passed on the project with Martin Lawrence in negotiations for a $20 million per picture deal to play the lead in both National Security and a sequel to Blue Streak (1999), with Lawrence next working on whichever project was ready to go first.

== Reception ==
On Rotten Tomatoes, National Security has an approval rating of 11% based on 89 reviews, with an average rating of 3.5/10. The site's critics consensus reads: "The action in National Security is mindless, while the humor says nothing insightful about racial issues." On Metacritic, the film has a weighted average score of 34 out of 100 based on 25 critics, indicating "generally unfavorable reviews". Audiences surveyed by CinemaScore gave the film an average grade of "B+" on scale of A+ to F.

Joe Leydon of Variety wrote that "Despite some tasty contributions from Lawrence and Zahn, too much of National Security has the bland flavor of microwaved leftovers." A. O. Scott of The New York Times said it "Lacks the wit to do anything new and instead recycles tired jokes and attitudes." Michael Wilmington of the Chicago Tribune wrote was critical of the script but said the actors save the film, and concludes "I wouldn't race out to see "National Security," but it does give you exactly what you'd expect: yocks, explosions and funny brawling buddies rolling all over those over-used L.A. freeways." Ann Hornaday of The Washington Post panned the film calling it "a by-the-numbers sop to adolescent testosterone overload" and said that to call Lawrence "a poor man's Richard Pryor" was both an insult to Pryor and to poor people. Tom Long of The Detroit News wrote that the movie was "loud, crass, dumb and then even dumber." John Monaghan of the Detroit Free Press highlighted what he saw as an "off-putting" racial subtext that made him unable to enjoy the movie.

Kevin Thomas of the Los Angeles Times gave it a positive review and called it "A funny, raucous action comedy, effectively teams Martin Lawrence and Steve Zahn in a film that's both laugh out loud funny and surprisingly subtle."
