= Jeff Kwatinetz =

American entertainment industry executive

- Born: April 6, 1965 (age 61); New York City, U.S.
- Education: Marlboro High School
- Alma mater: Harvard Law School; Northwestern University
- Occupations: Media proprietor; talent manager; attorney

Jeff Kwatinetz (born April 6, 1965) is an American attorney, talent manager and media proprietor. He is the former CEO of the Firm, Inc., a media production and talent management company in Santa Monica, California, and current COO of Cube Vision, a film and television production company he runs with his longtime business partner Ice Cube. He and Ice Cube are also the founders of Big3, a 3 on 3 professional basketball league.

== Early life and education ==
Kwatinetz was born in Brooklyn, New York to a Jewish family and lived in Brooklyn until the third grade, when his family moved to Marlboro Township, Monmouth County, New Jersey. He graduated from Marlboro High School. He attended Northwestern University in Evanston, Illinois and was chapter president of the Delta Upsilon fraternity. While President of Delta Upsilon University, Kwatinetz managed the band, Security, which did local shows in Evanston and Chicago, IL. He graduated from Harvard Law School with a J.D. degree.

== Career ==
Jeff Kwatinetz started his managing career with Chicago power pop trio, Material Issue. He attributes learning a lot about managing and the music industry to the band. Material Issue was Kwatinetz first band signed to a major label (Mercury). In addition, Kwatinetz claims that Material Issue and him invented, and had, the first Radio Show. Kwatinetz, partially due to his love of the film The Graduate was the one who had the idea for the cover of Mrs. Robinson, he originally wanted Material Issue to do the cover, but due to label conflicts, The Lemonheads recorded the track instead.

He has worked with many celebrities, including music acts Backstreet Boys, Jennifer Lopez, and Kelly Clarkson and actors Samuel L. Jackson, Vin Diesel and Colleen Ballinger.

Kwatinetz worked for Gallin-Morey Associates and he and Michael Green left to found The Firm in 1997. Kwatinetz and Green sued their former employer Sandy Gallin alleging sexual harassment. Gallin responded with a countersuit for $1 million alleging his former employees had breached their contractual obligations with his firm and produced the sexual harassment allegations by way of distraction from their violations. The lawsuits led to Hollywood seeing Kwatinetz as a resolute and sometimes contentious dealmaker.

The Firm quickly became one of the top management and production companies in the industry representing talent in all facets of entertainment. He has been successful in breaking, developing, and managing the careers of artists such as KoRn, Limp Bizkit, Backstreet Boys, Snoop Dogg, Enrique Iglesias, Vin Diesel, Ice Cube, Kelly Clarkson, OneRepublic, Rachel Weisz, Audioslave, Pete Yorn, Puddle of Mudd, and many more. In 2001, Kwatinetz filed a lawsuit against Robert F. X. Sillerman, founder of SFX Entertainment, accusing him of misappropriating The Firm's business plan after pulling out of acquiring 100% of The Firm. Later in 2001, Kwatinetz apologised to Sillerman and agreed to pay his legal costs. Kwatinetz eventually acquired Sillerman's 16% interest in The Firm. Kwatinetz rejected media reports calling him "headstrong" and "difficult".

The Firm acquired Artist Management Group in 2002 to add high-profile television and film industry managers and clients such as Leonardo DiCaprio, Cameron Diaz, Kate Hudson, Benicio del Toro, Bill Condon, and Martin Scorsese and expand into an all-encompassing entertainment management and production company.

=== Britney Spears ===
Kwatinetz's company represented Spears for one month in 2007. On September 17, 2007, he released a statement saying, "It saddens us to confirm media reports that we have terminated our professional relationship with Britney Spears. We have represented Britney for the past month. We believe Britney is enormously talented, and has made a terrific record. But current circumstances have prevented us from properly doing our job. We wish Britney the best."

=== Prospect Park and relaunch of The Firm ===
Kwatinetz left The Firm in late 2008 and founded the media production, record label and talent management company Prospect Park. He relaunched The Firm in August 2015. Kwatinetz serves as executive producer of the F/X comedy Wilfred and USA Network’s medical comedy, Royal Pains.

Jeff foresaw original content being consumed online. In 2011, pre-dating NETFLIX Originals, he planned on bringing daily soaps to the internet, but, at the time, the infrastructure was not available to make this a reality. In 2013, Prospect Park launched its own web channel, The Online Network, with revivals of the long-running daytime soap operas One Life to Live and All My Children. Later that year, it filed a lawsuit against ABC, the licensee of those series, and the Prospect Park Networks division filed for Chapter 11 bankruptcy in 2014. The production and music divisions remained unaffected, and in 2015 were positioned as subordinate entities to a reactivated The Firm, Inc.

=== Civil Rights Law ===
In late 2017, Kwatinetz began working with attorney Mark Geragos on numerous civil rights cases.

Kwatinetz graduated top of his class at Harvard Law School in 1991. In 2001, he was awarded the ACLU Torch of Liberty for his "commitment to Liberty and Justice for All."

== Controversies ==
=== Relationship with Steve Bannon ===
Kwatinetz has had a relationship with political strategist Steve Bannon, who served as Kwatinetz' partner in the Firm. Kwatinetz defended Bannon in an editorial piece in The Hollywood Reporter, saying that "he is not a racist."

=== Five Finger Death Punch ===
In 2016, Kwatinetz filed for an injunction against client Five Finger Death Punch alleging a breach of contract. The band and The Firm settled after 18 months of litigation. Five Finger Death Punch's recordings are now one of Prospect Park's last remaining and most valuable assets still under contract."

=== BIG3 Legal Issues ===
Kwatinetz has been involved in many lawsuits in relation to his BIG3 Basketball Tournament. Former league commission Roger Mason sued Kwatinetz and the BIG3 after being fired for alleged corruption. He claimed Kwatinetz fostered a "hostile and racist" environment and "has repeatedly referred to black athletes as 'rich n-––s.'" Kwatinetz denied the claims. The case was settled in an October settlement.

Another employee, Kainoa Henry, was fired from his position and later "filed the breach of contract complaint Monday, alleging he was unfairly forced to resign his chief creative officer job in part because co-founder Jeff Kwatinetz regularly referenced — and praised — right-wing firebrand Steve Bannon while running the three-on-three hoops league featuring retired NBA stars."

== See also ==
- Peter Katsis - Prospect Park partner
