= Michael Green (agent) =

American talent manager, entrepreneur and movie producer

Michael Green is an American talent manager, entrepreneur and movie producer.

== Career ==
Green began his career as a personal appearance agent in the early 1990s at Irvin Arthur Associates representing stand up comedians. He then moved to talent management at Gallin-Morey Associates, where he eventually became a Senior Manager.

In 1997, he co-founded The Firm, a music and talent management agency, with fellow Gallin-Morey employee Jeff Kwatinetz. Kwatinetz and Green sued their former employer Sandy Gallin alleging sexual harassment. Gallin responded with a countersuit for $1 million alleging his former employees had breached their contractual obligations with his firm and produced the sexual harassment allegations by way of distraction from their violations.

The company grew rapidly, eventually managing Backstreet Boys, Korn, Limp Bizkit, Pamela Anderson and others. Expanding beyond the representation business, The Firm also acquired and sold the shoe brand Pony, and controlled an equity position in Build-A-Bear Workshops. In 2002, Green sold his interests in the company to spend time with his family.

In 2005, he founded a new management company, The Collective. The Collective continued to represent Green’s longtime clients like Martin Lawrence, and also signed Linkin Park, Counting Crows, Enrique Iglesias, Slash, Alanis Morissette, and Emile Hirsch, among others. As CEO, Green expanded The Collective outside simple talent management, acquiring the horror movie site Bloody-Disgusting.com and popular YouTube accounts and personalities like Fred and Annoying Orange under Collective Digital Studio.

== Filmography ==
| Year | Film | Notes |
|---|---|---|
| 2000 | Big Momma's House | Producer |
| 2001 | Black Knight | Producer |
| 2003 | National Security | Producer |
| 2006 | Big Momma's House 2 | Producer |
| 2007 | Katt Williams: American Hustle | Executive Producer |
| 2011 | Fred 2: Night of the Living Fred | Executive Producer |
| 2011 | Big Mommas: Like Father, Like Son | Producer |
| 2012 | This Means War | Executive Producer |
