= Here on Earth (film) =

2000 US romantic drama film by Mark Piznarski

- Theatrical release poster
- Directed by: Mark Piznarski
- Written by: Michael Seitzman
- Produced by: David T. Friendly
- Starring: Chris Klein; Leelee Sobieski; Josh Hartnett; Bruce Greenwood; Annette O'Toole; Annie Corley; Stuart Wilson; Michael Rooker
- Cinematography: Michael D. O'Shea
- Edited by: Robert Frazen
- Music by: Kelly Jones; Andrea Morricone
- Production company: Fox 2000 Pictures
- Distributed by: 20th Century Fox
- Release date: March 24, 2000
- Running time: 96 minutes
- Country: United States
- Language: English
- Budget: $15 million
- Box office: $10.9 million

Here on Earth is a 2000 American romantic drama film directed by Mark Piznarski from a screenplay by Michael Seitzman. The film stars Chris Klein, Leelee Sobieski, and Josh Hartnett. The original music score was composed by Kelly Jones and Andrea Morricone.

== Plot ==
Kelvin "Kelley" Morse and Jasper Arnold become involved in a car race and accidentally damage Mable's Table, a restaurant owned by Samantha "Sam" Cavanaugh's parents. Both are sentenced to perform community service by repairing the damage.

Although Kelley comes from a wealthy family and Jasper's parents are working-class, they soon find themselves fighting over the same girl, Sam. While Jasper and Sam have been dating publicly for years, in secret, Kelley and Sam begin to spend time together. They soon find that they have more in common than they imagined, and they fall in love. Eventually, Jasper learns of their relationship and doesn't like it.

During a trip to Kelley's home in Boston, Kelley reveals to Sam that his mother killed herself. Sam brings Kelley into the house and they sleep together. In the morning, after Sam makes Kelley breakfast, Kelley's father arrives and informs him he must attend college early and give up his fling with Sam.

Upon returning to the small town, Sam's parents soon learn that their daughter's osteosarcoma has relapsed, which was initially discovered after a track injury, and now has only a few months to live. Sam tells Kelley that she thinks everyone has their own heaven and it is made of a combination of all the things they loved in life. She says that his mother has Kelley with her in her heaven. When Kelley learns the awful truth about Sam, he must decide if he should obey his father's wishes and go to college or stay by the side of the first girl he's ever loved.

Kelley and Jasper finish rebuilding the diner and their probation is up. In the end Kelley returns to be with Sam during her final months of life. At her funeral, Kelley recites a passage from a poem he and Sam loved. The film closes with a shot of Sam running through a field in her version of heaven.

== Cast ==
- Chris Klein as Kelvin "Kelley" Morse
- Leelee Sobieski as Samantha "Sam" Cavanaugh
- Josh Hartnett as Jasper Arnold
- Michael Rooker as Malcolm Arnold
- Annie Corley as Betsy Arnold
- Bruce Greenwood as Sheriff Earl Cavanaugh
- Annette O'Toole as Jo Cavanaugh
- Elaine Hendrix as Jennifer Cavanaugh
- Stuart Wilson as John Morse
- Ezekiel Johnson as an extra

== Reception ==
=== Box office ===
The film opened at #5 at the North American box office, making US$4.5 million in its opening weekend.

=== Critical response ===
Here on Earth received negative reviews from critics. On Rotten Tomatoes, it has an approval rating of 18% based on reviews from 68 critics. The website's critics consensus reads: "Critics say Here on Earth's weakness comes from its script. The story may appeal to young teenage girls, but it suffers from being overly sentimental and formulaic. The cinematography, however, is lovely in how it captures its Massachusetts setting." On Metacritic, the film has a score of 25% based on reviews from 24 critics, indicating "generally unfavorable" reviews.

Mick LaSalle of the San Francisco Chronicle praised Leelee Sobieski for her performance.

Roger Ebert criticized the film for its sentimentality. Paul Cullum of L.A. Weekly called the film "Complete and utter horseshit."

== Soundtrack ==
The single "Where You Are" by Jessica Simpson & Nick Lachey reached 22 at the US Mainstream Top 40.

No.	Title	Writer(s)	Performer	Length
1.	"Where You Are"	Louis Biancaniello, Nick Lachey, Sam Watters, Manto Stamatopoulou	Jessica Simpson featuring Nick Lachey	4:32
2.	"I Need Love"	Sam Phillips	Sixpence None the Richer	4:08
3.	"Whatever Turns You On"	Gregg Alexander, Rick Nowels	Devin	4:07
4.	"If You Sleep"	Tal Bachman	Tal Bachman	3:55
5.	"Tic Tocs"	Eric Foster White, Tim James	Tim James	3:34
6.	"Don't Need a Reason"	Ali Friend, Beth Orton, Ted Barnes	Beth Orton	5:02
7.	"Pick a Part That's New"	Kelly Jones, Richard Jones, Stuart Cable	Stereophonics	3:34
8.	"We Have Forgotten"	Matt Slocum	Sixpence None the Richer	5:08
9.	"Skyfall"	John Stephens, Michael Raphael	Neve	3:21
10.	"1000 Oceans"	Tori Amos	Tori Amos	4:17
11.	"Birches"	Andrea Morricone	Andrea Morricone	2:52
12.	"Here on Earth Score Suite"	Morricone	Morricone	6:54

"Black Balloon" by Goo Goo Dolls and "Breakout" by Foo Fighters are played during the film, but do not appear on the soundtrack album.
