= Prospect Park (production company) =

American entertainment production company

- Type: Subsidiary
- Industry: Television; Music; Acting
- Founded: 2008; 18 years ago
- Founder: Richard H. Frank; Jeff Kwatinetz; Peter Katsis
- Headquarters: Los Angeles, California, United States
- Products: The Online Network; Royal Pains.; Wilfred (U.S. TV series)
- Parent: The Firm, Inc. (2015–present)

Prospect Park is a Hollywood entertainment production company, founded in 2008 by Richard H. Frank, a former executive at the Walt Disney Television, and Jeff Kwatinetz, former CEO of the talent agency The Firm, Inc., and music manager Peter Katsis. Based in Century City, California, and embodies three distinct business units: music management, television production, and a record label. On May 3, 2011, former ABC executive Josh Barry joined the company to lead the production company.

The production company produced USA Network television series Royal Pains, as well as the FX Network series Wilfred and the WGN America series Salem. The music division is divided into the management department, which guides the careers of music artists, and Prospect Park Records, an independent record label which has served as the label home to artists such as Five Finger Death Punch, Korn, and Mindset Evolution. In 2014, it added British chart toppers You Me at Six and New York rapper Azealia Banks to its roster.

In 2013, Prospect Park launched its own web channel, The Online Network, with revivals of the long-running daytime soap operas One Life to Live and All My Children. Later that year it filed a lawsuit against ABC, the licensee of those series, and the Prospect Park Networks division filed for Chapter 11 bankruptcy in 2014. The production and music divisions remained unaffected, and in 2015 were positioned as subordinate entities to a reactivated The Firm, Inc.

== The Online Network ==
The Online Network
- Country: United States

Programming
- Language: English
- Picture format: 720p (HD) Widescreen

Ownership
- Owner: Prospect Park

History
- Launched: 29 April 2013

Links
- Website: theonlinenetwork.com, toln.com (both inactive)

Availability

Streaming media
- Hulu: TOLN
- Blog Talk Radio: TOLN

On July 7, 2011, ABC announced the licensing of its soaps to Prospect Park, who intended to continue production of the shows in a new paid online TV and interactive media network.

On September 27, 2011, Prospect Park announced that it would produce new episodes of the two daytime soap operas, which would air on its new Internet channel starting in January 2012.

On November 10, 2011, it was announced that the relaunch of All My Children had been indefinitely delayed and that Prospect Park would focus solely on the relaunch of One Life to Live. On November 23, 2011, Prospect Park suspended its plans altogether to launch an online channel with All My Children and One Life to Live. A year later, it was announced the plans were revived.

On January 7, 2013, it was confirmed via press release that Prospect Park's The Online Network would launch and that All My Children and One Life to Live would serve as anchor programming. Production of the shows resumed on February 25, 2013. The soap operas premiered with new 30 minute episodes on Hulu, Hulu Plus and iTunes on April 29, 2013. TOLN also produced a series of behind the scenes promotional "episodes" called MORE All My Children and MORE One Life to Live, as well as a radio talk show centered on the programs, called TOLN SOAPS Live with Michael Fairman.

== Litigation and bankruptcy ==
On April 18, 2013, Prospect Park filed a $25 million lawsuit against ABC over One Life to Live, alleging ABC failed to honor its part of the licensing agreement. Among the issues named in the lawsuit are allegations of ABC's attempts to sabotage Prospect Park's revival of the soaps by killing off One Life to Live characters loaned to General Hospital, failure on ABC's part to consult Prospect Park on storylines involving One Life to Live characters, and claiming that one One Life to Live character was actually a General Hospital character.

On June 6, 2013, production of both shows was halted due to a labor dispute with the International Alliance of Theatrical Stage Employees labor union, which was resolved two months later. On September 3, 2013, Prospect Park announced production of All My Children and One Life to Live would be suspended until the lawsuit with ABC was resolved. On November 11, 2013, several All My Children cast members announced that Prospect Park had closed production and canceled the series again.

On March 10, 2014, Prospect Park Networks announced that it had filed for Chapter 11 bankruptcy protection while it continued its lawsuit against ABC. ABC subsequently filed a countersuit seeking unpaid licensing fees. TOLN was dissolved later that year. The Firm, Inc. was reactivated in August 2015, with Prospect Park Productions as a subordinate entity continuing to produce its series, including Royal Pains and Salem, and the music divisions similarly unaffected.

ABC's countersuit was dismissed in October 2016, and Prospect Park's lawsuit was dismissed in December 2016, with the rights to All My Children and One Life to Live reverting to ABC.
