= Peter Katsis =

American music manager (1956/1957–2026)

- Born: 1956 or 1957; Chicago, Illinois, U.S.
- Died: August 6, 2026 (aged 69); Los Angeles, California, U.S.
- Occupation: Talent manager
- Years active: 1985–2026

Peter Katsis (1956 or 1957 – August 6, 2026) was an American music manager. He co-founded the management and production company Prospect Park, and was a founding partner of The Firm. He managed artists including Jane's Addiction, Korn, the Backstreet Boys, Limp Bizkit, and Morrissey.

== Life and career ==
Katsis, at 23, discovered and managed the Chicago industrial alt-rock band Ministry. In the mid-80s, he worked as an A&R executive at Trax Precision Records in Chicago and later served as the primary booking agent for Chicago house music artists Marshall Jefferson and Adonis. He also worked as a talent buyer and promoter in Chicago, booking and promoting shows at venues including The Metro, Club C.O.D., and The Riviera Theatre By 1989, he had transitioned fully into artist management and relocated to Los Angeles, where he became a partner at The Firm, an entertainment management company.

He was a partner at YM&U Group, a talent management company based in Beverly Hills. He most recently managed Bush, 5 Seconds of Summer, Fever 333, Jane’s Addiction, The Clockworks, and Liz Phair, among others.

In 2005 he produced the first concert by a U.S. rock band in Cuba as a cultural exchange event. With special permission granted by both U.S. President George W. Bush and Cuban President Fidel Castro, Audioslave performed a free concert in Havana, drawing over 70,000 attendees.

Katsis died from congestive heart failure in a Los Angeles hospital on August 6, 2026, at the age of 69.
