= Cirque Lodge =

Drug addiction treatment facility in Sundance, Utah

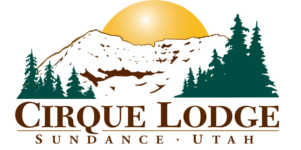

Geography
- Location: Sundance, Utah

Organisation
- Patron: Richard Losee

History
- Founded: 1999

Links
- Website: https://www.cirquelodge.com/

Cirque Lodge is a for-profit luxury drug rehab center located in Sundance, Utah, United States, founded in 1999. Cirque Lodge specializes in treating drug and alcohol addiction in adults and youth as well as offering family workshops, individualized therapy programs and weekly onsite AA meetings. In 2002, Cirque Lodge opened a second facility in Orem, Utah in the former Osmond Studios built for the Donny & Marie television series. At any one time the facilities have a maximum capacity of 56 patients.

== Program ==
The Cirque Lodge program is based on the Alcoholics Anonymous traditional twelve-step program. The treatment incorporates "experiential therapy", including activities such as hiking, fishing, rafting, art therapy and equine therapy. Cirque Lodge is providing multilingual treatment as part of their rehabilitation. The program includes both group and individual psychotherapy.

While celebrities are known to frequent the lodge, it also hosts affluent patients with lower profiles and has also offered scholarships to patients who could not afford treatment.
