= Kehillat Israel =

Synagogue in Los Angeles, California

- Location in Los Angeles

Religion
- Affiliation: Reconstructionist
- Ecclesiastical or organisational status: Synagogue
- Leadership: Rabbi Amy Bernstein
- Status: Active

Location
- Location: 16019 W. Sunset Blvd, Pacific Palisades, Los Angeles, California 90272
- Country: United States
- Coordinates: 34°02′57″N 118°32′06″W

Architecture
- Founder: Rabbi Abraham Winokur
- Established: 1950 (as a congregation)
- Completed: 1997

Website
- www.ourki.org

Kehillat Israel is a Reconstructionist synagogue located in Pacific Palisades, Los Angeles, California, in the United States. It is one of two Reconstructionist synagogues in greater Los Angeles (the other being the Malibu Jewish Center and Synagogue). Its senior rabbi is Amy Bernstein.

In 2025, tensions over Israel led Kehillat Israel to announce plans to disaffiliate from the Jewish Reconstructionist Federation. The congregation cited the organization's "failure to confront hostility to Israel among affiliated rabbis and rabbinical students", including failure to adequately address rising anti-Zionist sentiment among Reconstructionist rabbis and institutions.

== Notable members of the congregation ==
Notable current and former attendees include:

- Lloyd Braun, former Chairman of the ABC Entertainment Group
- Alden Ehrenreich, actor
- Jon Feltheimer, CEO of Lions Gate Entertainment
- Ellie Kanner, director
- Bob Saget
- Adam Sandler
- John Whitesell, director
