= The Firm, Inc. =

Artist and talent management company

- Type: Private
- Industry: Entertainment
- Founded: 1997 (original); 2015 (relaunch)
- Defunct: 2008 (original)
- Headquarters: Santa Monica, California
- Key people: Jeff Kwatinetz
- Products: Film production Television production Talent management
- Subsidiaries: Prospect Park

The Firm is a film and television production and talent management company based in Santa Monica, California. Established in 1997, it ceased operations in November 2008 and was relaunched by its founder, Jeff Kwatinetz, in August 2015. The Firm's divisions also include a record label and a marketing group.

== History ==
The Firm was founded by managers Jeff Kwatinetz and Michael Green in fall 1997 after they left Gallin-Morey Associates. Operating originally out of Kwatinetz' Malibu apartment, early clients included Martin Lawrence and Korn. The company was described by the Los Angeles Times as "racing through the music industry with the velocity of a bullet train" and by 2000, represented a stable of actors and musicians that had generated more than $1.5 billion in gross revenue. Kwatinetz partnered with David Baram and Rick Yorn to help run the operation later bringing on new talent including Criss Angel and Denzel Washington.

Robert F. X. Sillerman, founder of SFX Entertainment, acquired a 16% interest in The Firm for $25 million and later tried to acquire the remainder for $200 million, however, pulled out as he claimed it would breach a non-compete clause with Clear Channel Communications. In 2001, Kwatinetz filed a lawsuit against Sillerman, accusing him of misappropriating The Firm's business plan. Later in 2001, Kwatinetz apologised to Sillerman and agreed to pay his legal costs. Kwatinetz eventually acquired Sillerman's interest in The Firm.

In 2001, The Firm acquired the sportswear company Pony. It also owned half of the Build-A-Bear Workshops.

In 2002, The Firm purchased Michael Ovitz's Artist Management Group (AMG) and in 2004, it merged with entertainment consulting company Integrated Entertainment Partners (IEP), led by Rich Frank, a former president of Disney studios. During its first incarnation, the company represented Leonardo DiCaprio, Cameron Diaz, Robert De Niro, Kelly Clarkson, Korn, Ice Cube, Snoop Dogg, Dixie Chicks, Linkin Park, Backstreet Boys, Jennifer Lopez, Britney Spears, Limp Bizkit, and DC Pierson, among others. In addition to the individual successes of their clients, the company was noted for its prescience in melding celebrities with consumer brands and for its role as an architect of the $2.6 billion acquisition of Warner Music by a private equity consortium. While in 2003, the subsidiary Firm Films had reached a first-look deal with 20th Century Fox.

The Firm ceased operations in 2008.

== Prospect Park ==
Several months after the Firm was closed, Kwatinetz and Frank founded Prospect Park, an entertainment company which replicated the scope of The Firm. Financed through Kwatinetz' personal assets, Prospect Park focused on TV and film development and production and included an artist management division and a record company. In 2013, it launched the short-lived Online Network with the soap operas One Life to Live and All My Children. The company shut down both shows in 2013 as it filed a lawsuit against ABC, from whom they had licensed the rights to both series. Prospect Park declared bankruptcy in 2014, pending an outcome on the lawsuit.

== Reactivation ==
In August 2015, it was announced that the Firm had been reactivated, a decision which Kwatinetz said was based on feedback from the creative community. Prospect Park senior executives Jeremy Summers, Angelica Cob-Baehler and Josh Barry transitioned to The Firm, and Robbie Brenner, formerly the president of production at Relativity Media, was named president of The Firm's film division shortly after the company relaunched.

Under the banner of Prospect Park Productions, the Firm produces the television series Salem for WGN America and USA Network's Royal Pains; as of 2015, Salem was in its third season and Royal Pains in its eighth. As of 2015, the company had projects in development for broadcast, cable and digital platforms which included Black Heart for ABC, Talent for NBC,Tough Love for Amazon, Hard Foul for Showtime, A Midsummer’s Nightmare (Lifetime), Relics (Sony International Networks). Prospect Park produced FX's Wilfred, which ran from 2011 through 2014.

The Firm manages Ice Cube's production company, Cube Vision. Cube Vision produced Straight Outta Compton, as well as the Friday, Barbershop and the Ride Along film franchises. Kwatinetz has managed Ice Cube since 1996.

In addition to Ice Cube, the Firm manages P.O.D., and Dead Sara, among others. It operates Prospect Park Records, which has released records by artists including Azealia Banks, Korn, You Me at Six, and Five Finger Death Punch, who hit No. 1 on the Top Rock Albums chart with their 2015 release Got Your Six.

The company is also developing non-basketball-related revenue and marketing opportunities for the National Basketball Players Association.

== See also ==
- Peter Katsis – Prospect Park partner
