= Chris Klein (actor) =

American actor (born 1979)

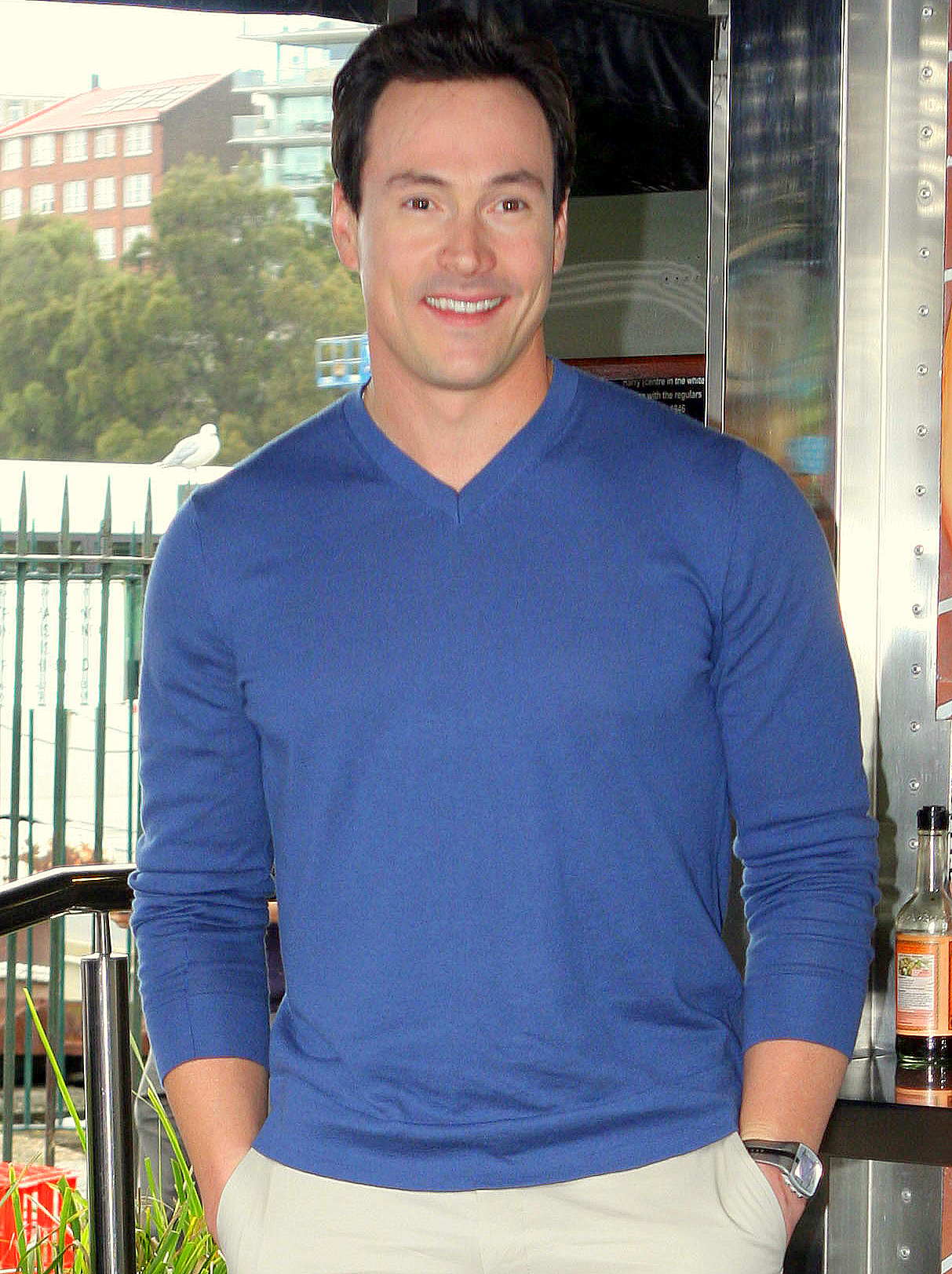
- Klein in 2012
- Born: Frederick Christopher Klein; March 14, 1979 (age 47); Hinsdale, Illinois, U.S.
- Occupation: Actor
- Years active: 1999–present
- Known for: American Pie
- Spouse: Laina Rose Thyfault (m. 2015)
- Children: 2

Frederick Christopher Klein (born March 14, 1979) is an American actor. He made his on-screen debut with a supporting role in the dark comedy film Election (1999) before his breakout starring role as Chris "Oz" Ostreicher in the teen sex comedy film American Pie (1999). He reprised his role in two sequels: American Pie 2 (2001) and American Reunion (2012).

Following American Pie, Klein starred in the comedy films Say It Isn't So (2001), Just Friends (2005), and American Dreamz (2006), and had lead roles in the drama film Here on Earth (2000) and the science fiction sports film Rollerball (2002). He also starred in the war film We Were Soldiers (2002), the drama film The United States of Leland (2003), and the martial arts action film Street Fighter: The Legend of Chun-Li (2009).

After a starring role in the film Authors Anonymous (2014) and a recurring role as Drew on the FX sitcom Wilfred (2011–2014), Klein experienced a career resurgence in the late 2010s with his main role as Orlin Dwyer / Cicada on season 5 of the CW superhero television series The Flash (2018–2019). Following The Flash, he had a main role as Bill Townsend on the first three seasons of the Netflix drama series Sweet Magnolias (2020–2023) and starred in the slasher film Fear Street: Prom Queen (2025).

== Early life ==
Klein was born in Hinsdale, Illinois, and moved to Omaha, Nebraska, at age 13, and later attended Millard West High School.

== Career ==
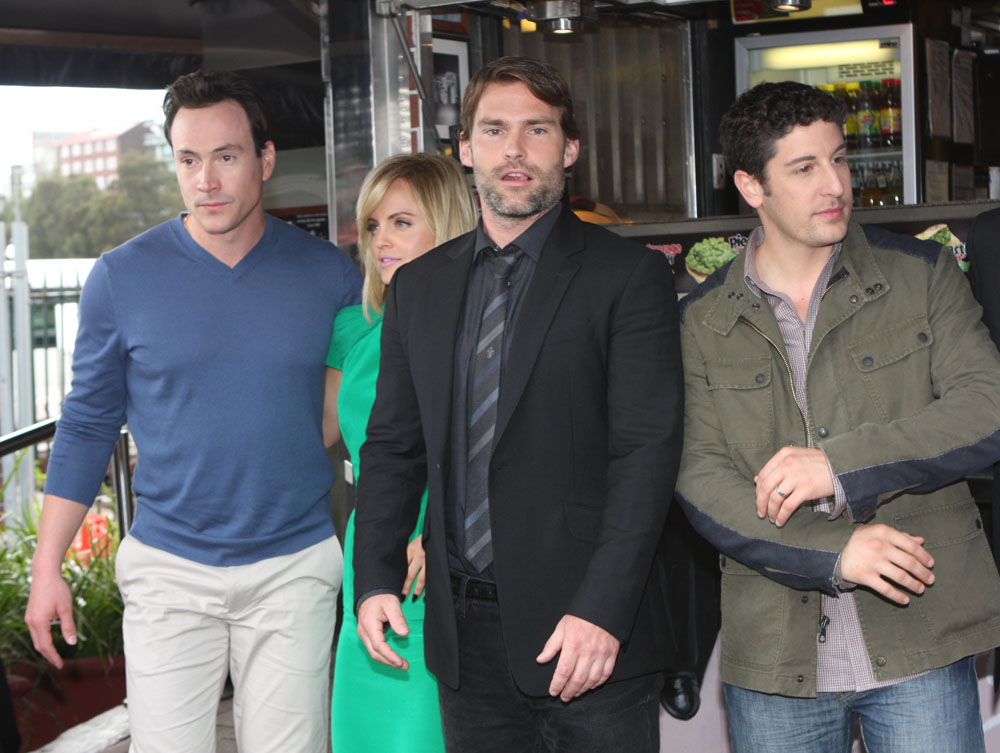
Klein at an American Pie reunion

Klein made his on-screen debut with a supporting role in the comedy film Election (1999). The film was released in April 1999, to positive reviews. Soon after, Klein found steady work in the film industry while briefly attending TCU, where he studied theater and was a member of the Lambda Chi Alpha fraternity. He was next seen in American Pie, acting as Christopher Russell Ostreicher, which opened on July 9, 1999, and was a box office success. Klein then starred in Here on Earth (2000) alongside LeeLee Sobieski and Josh Hartnett and Say It Isn't So (2001) with Heather Graham. Klein reprised his role in American Pie 2 (2001) and American Reunion (2012), but was not in American Wedding reportedly due to scheduling conflicts. In 2002, Klein had a role in the Mel Gibson Vietnam War film We Were Soldiers. Klein starred in the 2002 remake of the film Rollerball, but the film was a massive critical and financial failure. Klein has also appeared in several teen movies, including Just Friends (2005) and American Dreamz (2006).

Klein played Drew on the FX sitcom Wilfred (2011–2014). In 2014, he was cast as an American pilot in the Damien Lay film The Uberkanone. He co-starred in the 2014 comedy indie film Authors Anonymous with Kaley Cuoco. In 2018, Klein was cast as Cicada, the main villain of the fifth season of superhero television series The Flash. He then played Bill Townsend on the first three seasons of the Netflix drama series Sweet Magnolias (2020–2023) and starred in the slasher film Fear Street: Prom Queen (2025).

== Personal life ==
In January 2000, Klein and actress Katie Holmes began dating. The couple became engaged around Christmas of 2003. The couple called off the engagement and ended their relationship in March 2005.

Klein was arrested for drunk driving on February 5, 2005, in San Diego County and again in Los Angeles on June 16, 2010. On June 21, 2010, it was announced that Klein had checked into the Cirque Lodge to begin a 30-day alcohol addiction program. Klein's publicist explained that, "after recent events, Chris was forced to take a clear look at a problem he has been trying to deal with himself for years. He understands now that he cannot beat this addiction alone."

Klein met Laina Rose Thyfault, a travel agent, in 2011 at a mutual friend's wedding. They got engaged in December 2014, after three years of dating and married eight months later on August 9, 2015, in Montana. In March 2016, Klein announced in a tweet that he and his wife were expecting their first child together. Their son was born in 2016. The couple also has a daughter, born in 2018.

== Filmography ==
=== Film ===
Film
Year	Title	Role	Notes
1999	Election	Paul Metzler	
1999	American Pie	Chris "Oz" Ostreicher	
2000	Here on Earth	Kelvin "Kelley" Morse	
2001	Say It Isn't So	Gilbert Noble	
2001	American Pie 2	Chris "Oz" Ostreicher	
2002	Rollerball	Jonathan Cross	
2002	We Were Soldiers	2nd Lt. Jack Geoghegan	
2003	The United States of Leland	Allen Harris	
2005	Tilt-A-Whirl	Customer #2	Short film
2005	Just Friends	Dusty Dinkleman	
2005	The Long Weekend	Cooper Waxman	
2006	American Dreamz	William Williams	
2006	Lenexa, 1 Mile	Andy Lausier	
2007	The Good Life	Tad Tokas	
2007	Day Zero	George Rifkin	
2007	New York City Serenade	Ray	
2007	The Valley of Light	Noah	
2008	Hank and Mike	Conrad Hubriss	
2009	Street Fighter: The Legend of Chun-Li	Charlie Nash	
2009	The Six Wives of Henry Lefay	Stevie	
2009	Play Dead	Ronnie Reno	Direct-to-video
2010	Caught in the Crossfire	Briggs	
2012	American Reunion	Chris "Oz" Ostreicher	
2014	Authors Anonymous	Henry Obert	
2016	Game of Aces	Jackson Cove	
2018	The Competition	Calvin Chesney	
2019	Benchwarmers 2: Breaking Balls	Ben McGrath	
2025	Fear Street: Prom Queen	Dan Falconer	
2025	Labyrinth		
TBA	Bad Counselors		Post-production

=== Television ===
Television
Year	Title	Role	Notes
2002	The Electric Playground		Episode: "Episode #8.5"
2006	American Dad!	Gary/Rick (voice)	Episode: "With Friends Like Steve's"
2007	The Valley of Light	Noah	Hallmark Hall of Fame
2008	Welcome to The Captain	Marty Tanner	Main role; 5 episodes
2010	The Good Guys	Dep. Chief George Jenkins	Episode: "Partners"
2011–2014	Wilfred	Drew	Recurring role; 15 episodes
2012	Franklin & Bash	Tommy Dale	Episode: "650 to SLC"
2012	Raising Hope	Brad	Episode: "What Up, Bro?"
2012	Tron: Uprising	Dash (voice)	Recurring role; 3 episodes
2015	Motive	Brad Calgrove	Episode: "Pilot Error"
2015	Damaged	Sam Luck	Lifetime television movie
2016	Idiotsitter	Himself/DJ Doghead	Episode: "Fumigation"
2016	The Grinder	Benji	Episode: "Genesis"
2018–2019	The Flash	Orlin Dwyer / Cicada	Main role (season 5); 16 episodes
2020–2023	Sweet Magnolias	Dr. Bill Townsend	Main role; 30 episodes

=== Awards and nominations ===
Year	Award	Category	Nominated work	Result
2000	Chicago Film Critics Association	Most Promising Actor	American Pie	Nominated
2000	Young Hollywood Awards	Best Ensemble Cast	American Pie	Won
2000	Teen Choice Awards	Choice Liar	American Pie	Nominated
2000	Teen Choice Awards	Choice Breakout Performance	American Pie	Nominated
2000	Online Film & Television Association	Best Breakthrough Performance: Male	Election	Nominated
2001	Young Hollywood Awards	Superstar of Tomorrow – Male	Chris Klein	Won
