= David Zuckerman (TV producer) =

American television producer and writer (born 1962)

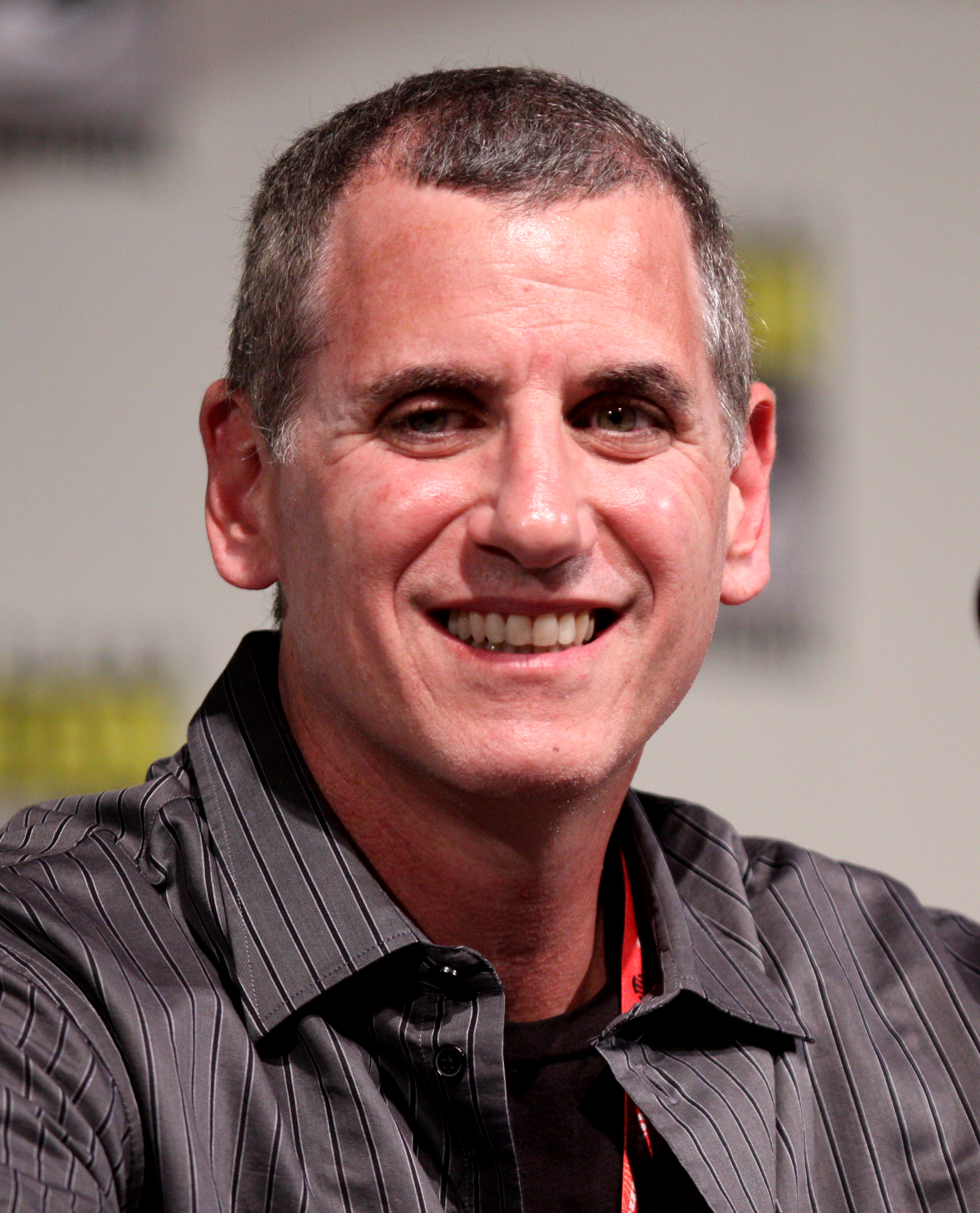
- Zuckerman at the 2011 San Diego Comic-Con
- Born: David J. Zuckerman; August 28, 1962 (age 64); Danville, California, U.S.
- Education: University of California, Los Angeles
- Occupations: Television producer, writer
- Years active: 1989–2014
- Spouse: Ellie Kanner (divorced)
- Children: 2

David J. Zuckerman (born August 28, 1962) is an American former television producer and writer, best known as the original showrunner and executive producer of the animated comedy series Family Guy, as well as the creator of the American adaptation of the Australian television series of the same name, Wilfred.

A native of Danville, California, Zuckerman is a graduate of the University of California, Los Angeles. Zuckerman first wrote for the sitcom The Fresh Prince of Bel-Air, and then went on to write and produce episodes for the Fox animated series King of the Hill. In 1999, along with writer and producer Seth MacFarlane, he developed another Fox animated series, entitled Family Guy. He subsequently worked on MacFarlane's second series, American Dad!, before adapting the Australian live action series Wilfred and producing it under the same name for FX.

== Early life and education ==
Zuckerman was born and raised in Danville, California, and is a graduate of Monte Vista High School. He also has a degree from University of California, Los Angeles. He has German-Jewish ancestry.

== Career ==
Zuckerman began his career as a creative executive for Lorimar-Telepictures and NBC. He then began writing full-time when he was hired for a staff job on 1990 NBC sitcom The Fresh Prince of Bel-Air. As a writer and producer, he helped play a key role in the launch of the first seasons of the Fox animated series King of the Hill, which he wrote for from 1997 until 1999, before leaving to develop the series Family Guy. Zuckerman was partnered with Seth MacFarlane, the creator of Family Guy, and served as the series's original showrunner during its first two seasons, although he does not have a single writing credit on it.

Afterward, Zuckerman was brought in to develop the Fox animated series American Dad!, also created by MacFarlane Zuckerman would work on the show until the end of its fourth season. He would also go on to create two short-lived network series, as well as an internet show. In 2011, Zuckerman created the American adaptation of the Australian television series of the same name, entitled Wilfred, for the cable network FX, starring Elijah Wood and Jason Gann.

== Personal life ==
In 1985, Zuckerman appeared as a contestant on the game show Sale of the Century, winning $2,800 in cash and prizes.

Zuckerman was married to film and television director Ellie Kanner. They have two sons, Zachary and Adam, and are now divorced. He belonged (along with his former wife) to the Kehillat Israel Reconstructionist Congregation of Pacific Palisades.

== Filmography ==
| Year | Title | Role |
|---|---|---|
| 1993–1995 | The Fresh Prince of Bel-Air | Writer, co-producer |
| 1997–1999 | King of the Hill | Writer, supervising producer & co-executive producer |
| 1999–2000 | Family Guy | Developer & executive producer |
| 2005–2009 | American Dad! | Writer & co-executive producer |
| 2011–2014 | 'Wilfred | Developer, executive producer & writer |
