= Fiona Gubelmann =

American actress (born 1980)

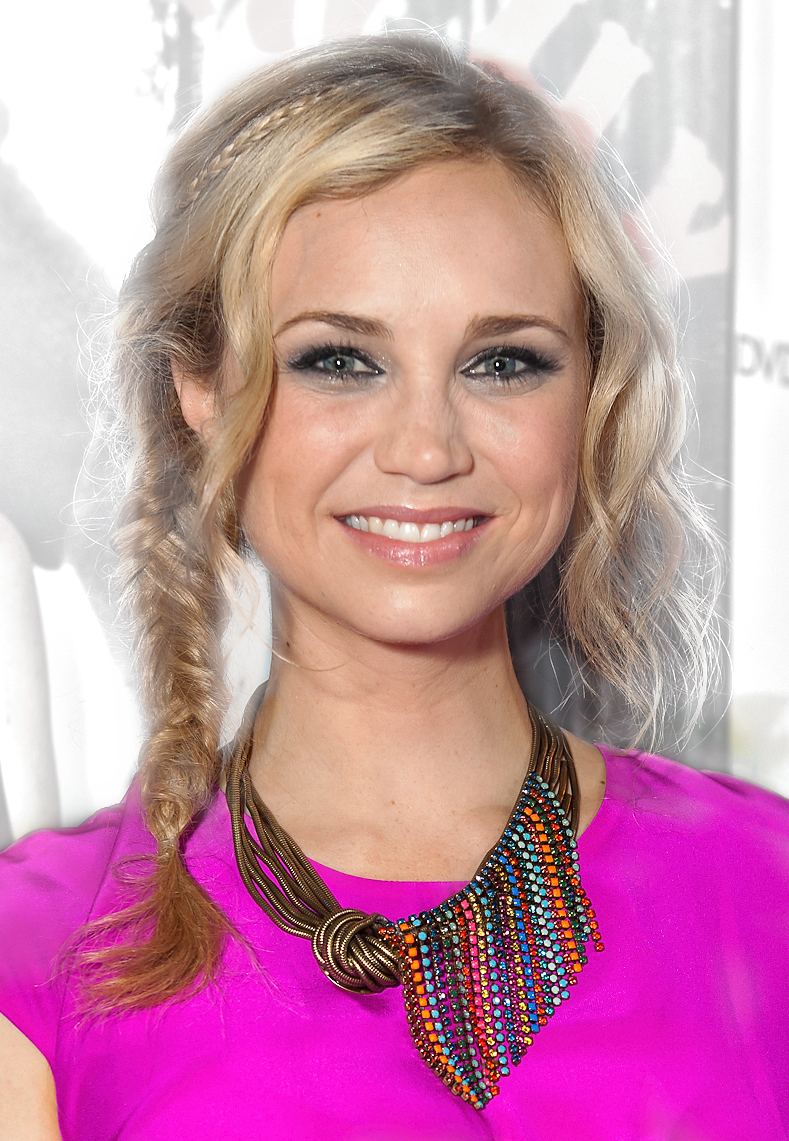
- Gubelmann in July 2012
- Born: March 30, 1980 (age 46); Santa Monica, California, U.S.
- Education: UCLA
- Occupation: Actress
- Years active: 2003–present
- Spouse: Alex Weed

Fiona Gubelmann (born March 30, 1980) is an American actress. She starred as Jenna in the 2011–2014 FX comedy series Wilfred, and as Dr. Morgan Reznick in the ABC medical drama The Good Doctor. Gubelmann has appeared in a number of single-episode roles in television, including CSI: NY, My Name Is Earl, Knight Rider and Don't Trust the B— in Apartment 23 as well as a handful of films including Employee of the Month and Downstream.

== Early life and education ==
Fiona Gubelmann was born in Santa Monica, California. She began acting and dancing in preschool, and her mother enrolled her in dance classes as a child. Her first play was at the age of four in a ballet version of The Cabbage Patch Kids. As a child and teenager, she attended drama camps in the summer, acted in local community theater, and became involved in the drama department at her school. She enrolled at the University of California, Los Angeles (UCLA), where she was a pre-medical major. She successfully auditioned for a play during her freshman year. She found she enjoyed acting so much that she switched her major to theater. During her time as an undergraduate, she volunteered with ArtsBridge, a program for at-risk youth in the Los Angeles area.

She graduated from UCLA in 2002, and went on to study acting at the Beverly Hills Playhouse (performing in plays with the organization's Katselas Theater Company).

== Career ==
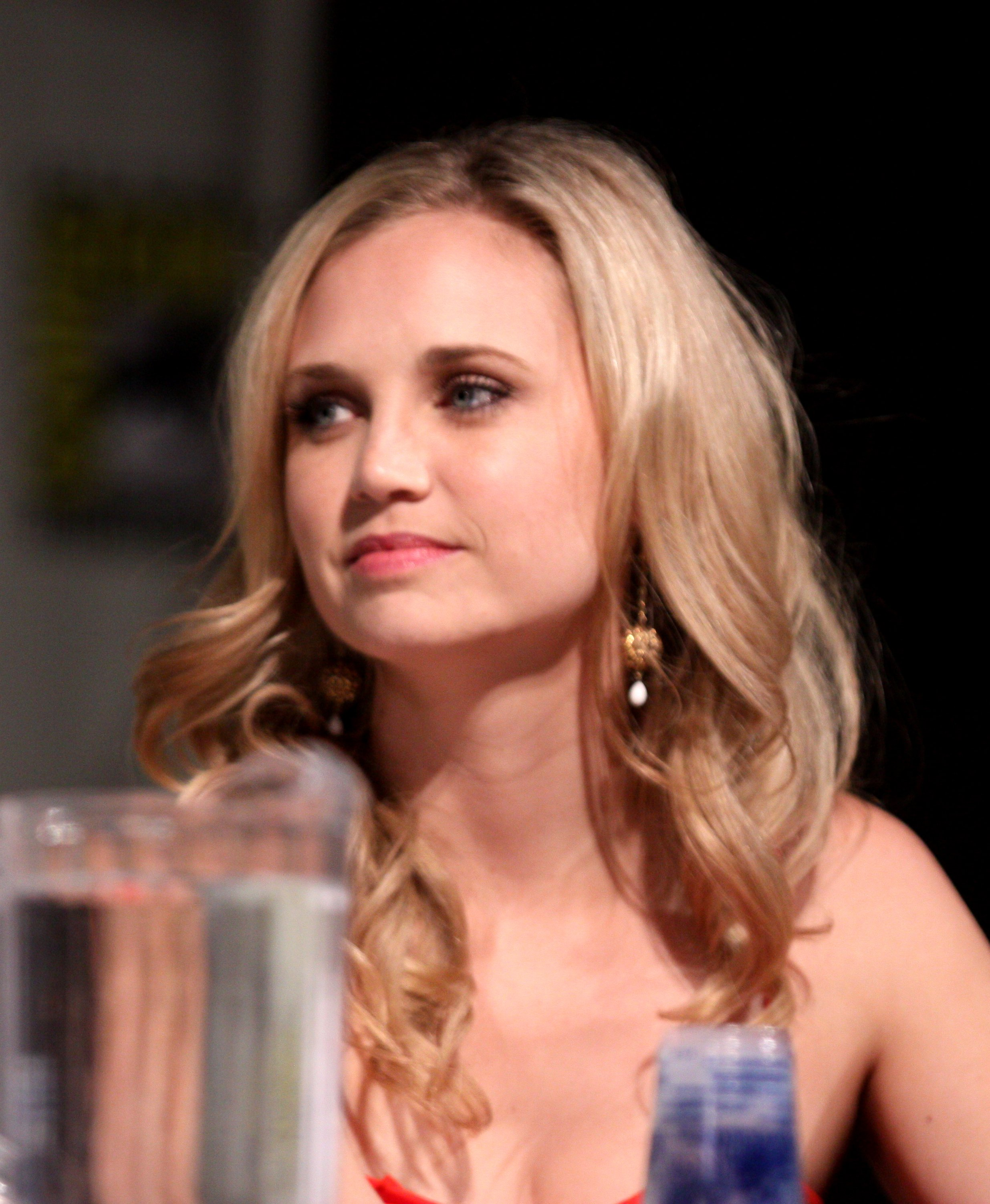
Gubelmann at 2011 San Diego Comic-Con

Gubelmann made her television acting debut in 2003 on the UPN sitcom The Mullets, and made her film debut the following year in the comedy Employee of the Month. She appeared as a guest star in a number of television series and in a few films over the next several years. She also continued stage work, appearing in Peter Lefcourt's play La Ronde de Lunch in Los Angeles in 2009.

When Gubelmann's agent sent her the script for Wilfred, she said that she "absolutely fell in love with it", although "didn't quite get the whole guy in the dog suit thing". She watched some of the original Australian version online, and described her reaction as "Oh my God, this is amazing!" After auditioning, she was called back several more times over the course of three and half weeks. She also auditioned with Elijah Wood and Jason Gann so producers could see if she had on-screen chemistry with her potential co-stars, and was tested a final time before winning the role.

In 2014, she and her husband, Alex, were featured in an episode of the House Hunters spin-off House Hunters Renovation where they were shown buying and renovating their new home.

Gubelmann has appeared in two Lifetime movies and eight Hallmark movies.

Gubelmann started appearing on The Good Doctor as surgeon Dr. Morgan Reznick in a recurring role in the first season and was promoted to a series regular in the second season.

== Filmography ==
Year	Title	Role	Notes
2004	911 nightmare	Role	Notes
2004	Employee of the Month	Amber	
2004	Blue Demon	Alice	Direct-to-video
2005	Horror High	Daphne	Direct-to-video
2007	Blades of Glory	Woodland Fairie	
2010	Downstream	Tabitha	
2010	Sex Tax: Based on a True Story	Tina	
2013	Super Buddies	Princess Jorala	Voice role; direct-to-video
2014	Don't Blink	Ella	
2017	Rice on White	Julie	
2017	Surprise Me!	Genie Burns	
2019	The Way We Weren't	Charlotte	

=== Television ===
Year	Title	Role	Notes
2003	The Mullets	Valley girl	Episode: "Airway to Heaven"
2004	Cold Case	Bobbi Jean Banks 1968	Episode: "The House"
2004	The Mountain	Darlene Toth	Episode: "The Letter"
2005	Joey	Anna	Episode: "Joey and the Premiere"
2007	CSI: NY	Isabella Cooksey	Episode: "What Schemes May Come"
2007	My Name Is Earl	Lucy	Episode: "Frank's Girl"
2008	Knight Rider	Courtney Flynn	Episode: "Knight of the Zodiac"
2009	The Closer	Lisa Price	Episode: "Waivers of Extradition"
2009	Californication	Young wife	Episode: "Zoso"
2011–2014	Wilfred	Jenna Mueller	Main role
2011	Parenthood	Sandy	2 episodes
2012	Criminal Minds	Erika	Episode: "A Family Affair"
2012	How to Be a Gentleman	Amy	2 episodes (1 uncredited)
2012	Family Guy	Lois' New Friend #2	Voice role; episode: "Lois Comes Out of Her Shell"
2012	Wedding Band	Violet	Episode: "Time of My Life"
2013	Guys with Kids	Sage	2 episodes
2013	Don't Trust the B— in Apartment 23	Stephanie	Episode: "Mean Girls..."
2013	Animal Practice	Tinsley French	Episode: "Wingmen"
2013	We Are Men	Sara	Episode: "Pilot"
2014	Friends with Better Lives	Kelly	Episode: "The Imposter"
2014	Modern Family	Lisa	Episode: "Won't You Be Our Neighbor"
2014	Key & Peele	Sex addict #1	Episode: "Sex Addict Wendell"
2014	House Hunters Renovation	Self	Episode: "Modern vs. Charming Makeover"
2015	New Girl	Val	Episode: "The Right Thing"
2015	Melissa & Joey	Noelle Devereaux	Episode: "The Book Club"
2015	Mad Men	Eve	Episode: "Person to Person"
2015	The League	Berkley	Episode: "The Block"
2015	iZombie	Houdina	Episode: "Abra Cadaver"
2016	Mommy's Little Girl	Theresa Malcolms	Television film (Lifetime)
2016	Dispatch	Christine McCullers	Television film (Lifetime); also known as 911 Emergency
2016	Telenovela	Kelly	Episode: "Caught in the Act"
2016	Mommy's Little Girl	Theresa	Television film (Lifetime)
2016	Tulips in Spring	Rose Newell	Television film (Hallmark)
2016	Castle	Linda Weinberg	Episode: "Tone Death"
2017	One Day at a Time	Lori	4 episodes
2017	Daytime Divas	Heather Flynn-Kellog	Main role
2017	Christmas Next Door	April Stewart	Television film (Hallmark)
2017	American Housewife	Courtney	Episode: "The Couple"
2018–2024	The Good Doctor	Dr. Morgan Reznick	Recurring role (season 1); main role (seasons 2–7)
2018	Lucifer	Kay / Maddie	Episode: "The Last Heartbreak"
2018	Royally Ever After	Sarah	Television film (Hallmark)
2019	Easter Under Wraps	Erin	Television film (Hallmark)
2021	The Vows We Keep	Hazel	Television film (Hallmark)
2024	'Tis the Season to Be Irish	Rose	Television film (Hallmark)
2024	Sugarplummed	Miranda	Television film (Hallmark)
2025	A Royal Montana Christmas	Princess Victoria of Zelarnia	Television film (Hallmark)
2026	All's Fair in Love and Mahjong	Ronni	Television film (Hallmark)

=== Web ===
Year	Title	Role	Notes
2008	Comedy Gumbo	The Future Mrs. Chambers	Episode: "Top-R-Off"
2008	Comedy Gumbo	ShmappleBapp's hostess	3 episodes
2012	Save the Supers	Rascal	2 episodes
2012	The Screen Junkies Show	Snow White	Episode: "Disney's Star Wars Auditions"
