= Wilfred (American TV series) =

American sitcom television series

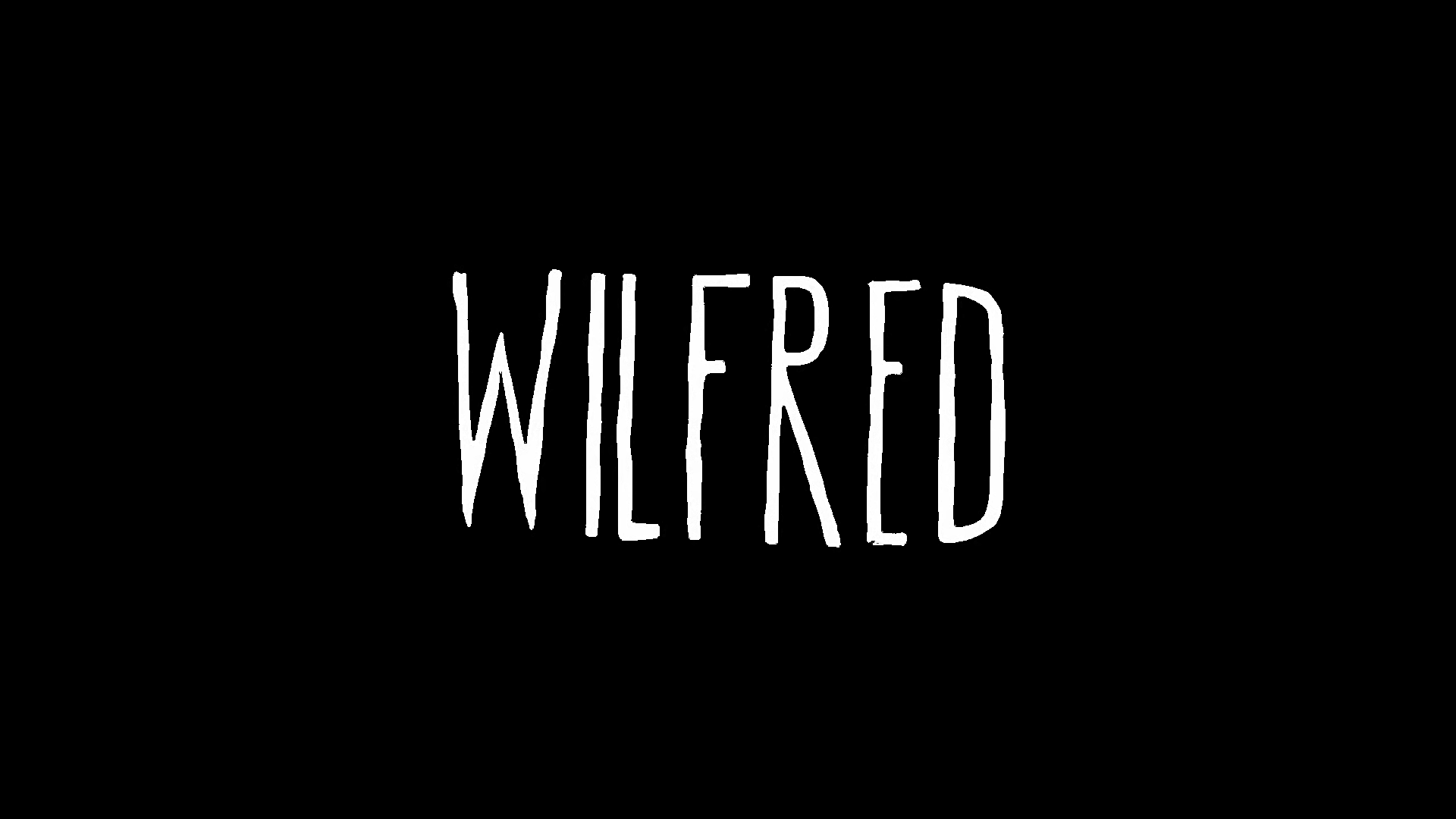
- Genre: Sitcom; Black comedy
- Based on: Wilfred
- Developed by: David Zuckerman
- Directed by: Randall Einhorn; Victor Nelli Jr. (season 1)
- Starring: Elijah Wood; Jason Gann; Fiona Gubelmann; Dorian Brown
- Music by: Jim Dooley
- Country of origin: United States
- Original language: English
- No. of seasons: 4
- No. of episodes: 49 (list of episodes)

Production
- Executive producers: Randall Einhorn; Jason Gann; David Zuckerman; Rich Frank; Paul Frank; Jeff Kwatinetz; Joe Connor; Ken Conner; Reed Agnew; Eli Jorné
- Producers: Mark Grossan; Reed Agnew; Eli Jorné; Susan V. McConnell
- Production location: California
- Cinematography: Bradford Lipson; Kurt Jones; Tom Magill
- Running time: 20-26 minutes
- Production companies: Zook, Inc. Prospect Park; Renegade Australia; SBS Australia; FX Productions

Original release
- Network: FX
- Release: June 23, 2011 – September 5, 2013
- Network: FXX
- Release: June 25 – August 13, 2014

Related
- Wilfred (Australian TV series)

Wilfred is an American sitcom that aired from June 23, 2011, to August 13, 2014, for a total of four seasons. Based on the Australian SBS One series of the same name, it stars Elijah Wood and series co-creator Jason Gann, reprising his role of the eponymous dog. The series was adapted for the American television channel FX by Family Guy veteran David Zuckerman, and moved to FXX for its fourth and final season.

== Plot ==
The series follows Ryan, a depressed ex-lawyer who is the only one able to see his neighbor Jenna's pet dog Wilfred, as a man in a dog suit. Throughout the show, Ryan and Wilfred become close, spending nearly every day together. Wilfred is vulgar, a bad influence, pushy and often mean. Wilfred pressures Ryan to learn life lessons, reveal memories, admit shortcomings, and do things he would otherwise not do through strange and sometimes abusive methods.

== Cast ==
=== Main ===
- Elijah Wood as Ryan Newman, a timid ex-shark lawyer. He begins the series with harsh depression and suicidal tendencies. He continues to be clingy and dependent with Wilfred, and harbors an unrequited love for Jenna. Ryan often does things that Wilfred encourages him to do.
- Jason Gann as Wilfred Fazio Mueller, a foul-mouthed and blunt Australian-accented shepherd dog that Ryan sees as a man in a dog suit but everyone else sees as a real dog, who loves his owner Jenna, and is cocky and jealous of well-behaved dogs. He has a love of stuffed animals, in particular Bear & Raffi. Bear is his codependent giant stuffed teddy bear in Ryan's basement. Raffi is a stuffed giraffe that Wilfred courts by conning Ryan into whoring himself to a desperate executive woman whose car he hit. As the series progresses, Wilfred is often torn between his love for Bear and his lust for other stuffed animals. As the titular character, he acts on his own instincts which put Ryan in situations but surprisingly helps him with his life problems.
- Fiona Gubelmann as Jenna Mueller. Jenna is Wilfred’s owner and the love interest of Ryan, her neighbor. Ryan watches Wilfred while Jenna is at work. She is a charming TV personality who sometimes gets caught in the cross hairs of Wilfred and Ryan's shenanigans. She is constantly trying to make things work out with her on-again-off-again beau Drew.
- Dorian Brown as Kristen Newman, Ryan's sister, an OB/GYN and single mom who is seemingly dependent on Ryan, as pointed out by Wilfred. She gets pregnant and has a baby named Joffrey in the second season.

=== Recurring ===
- Chris Klein as Drew, Jenna's easygoing and lighthearted but competitive boyfriend and eventual husband. Wilfred despises him despite his good relationship with Ryan.
- Gerry Bednob as Mr. Patel (season 1; guest season 3), Ryan's rude Indian neighbor.
- J. P. Manoux as Leo (season 1), Kristen's obnoxious and estranged husband who disapproves of her job as a doctor, and who leaves her when she tells him of her affair with Dr. Ramos.
- Rodney To as Dr. Bangachon.
- Rob Riggle as Kevin (season 2), Ryan's friendly and easygoing co-worker.
- Steven Weber as Jeremy (season 2), Ryan's boss at his new job, who kills himself after their secrets are stolen by a rival company.
- Harriet Sansom Harris as Lonnie Goldsmith (season 4).
- Allison Mack as Amanda (season 2; guest season 4), Ryan's co-worker and eventual girlfriend who gets sent to a psychiatric ward after it’s revealed that she stole company secrets and believes Wilfred can talk to her.
- Dwight Yoakam as Bruce (seasons 1–3), a mysterious character who also shares the ability to see and talk to Wilfred.

== Episodes ==
The show follows a young man named Ryan (Elijah Wood) and his neighbor's dog Wilfred (Jason Gann). In the opening episode, Ryan concocts a drug cocktail to die by suicide. After this failed attempt, Ryan's neighbor Jenna (Fiona Gubelmann) knocks on his door to ask him to look after Wilfred, whom Ryan sees and hears as a man in a dog costume.

Season	Episodes	Originally released	
Season	Episodes	First released	Last released
1	13	June 23, 2011	September 8, 2011
2	13	June 21, 2012	September 20, 2012
3	13	June 20, 2013	September 5, 2013
4	10	June 25, 2014	August 13, 2014

== Production ==
=== Development ===
Wilfred is based on the critically acclaimed Australian series of the same name and was adapted for FX by Family Guy veteran David Zuckerman. Wilfred is produced by FX Productions, and the executive producers include Zuckerman, Rich and Paul Frank, Jeff Kwatinetz, and Joe and Ken Connor from the original Australian series. Wilfred co-creator Jason Gann and Randall Einhorn serve as co-executive producers. Einhorn directed ten episodes of the first season and Victor Nelli Jr. directed three. The pilot episode was filmed in summer 2010, written by Zuckerman and directed by Einhorn.

Unlike the Australian version—which concentrated equally on Wilfred, his owner and her boyfriend—the American version is presented as a buddy comedy between Wilfred and Ryan.

=== Adapting the Australian series ===
There was interest in continuing the series on SBS, including talk about a possible film. However, Renegade Film, the company that produced the original Australian series, was unable to sell it in its original version to any other countries. Gann departed to create an entirely new series for the United States that used the format of the original, and additional Australian seasons were not pursued. Gann was initially hesitant to make an American series, stating, "I had no interest in making the same show again, just surrounded by people with different accents." However, the show in the United States differed greatly from the original series.

When the show moved to the United States, head writer and show creator Jason Gann took a more advisory role in the writers room, writing only six episodes of the show's four-season run. Gann has noted that writing the American version was more taxing than writing the Australian version. His pitches often got rejected, and ultimately in the transition, he gave up a lot of creative control. This resulted in departing from the Australian series in several ways.

When David Zuckerman took over the series, he expressed that the show's lack of international appeal was due to a lack of clear rules that the fantasy elements of the show could follow. He made it a priority to set and follow certain rules in the new series. In reworking the character of Wilfred and his relationship with Ryan for the American audience, Gann used the film My Bodyguard as a reference point. The show took on a lighthearted and hopeful tone, as the original series was often cited as being extremely cynical.

The show was pitched to Gann as a different vehicle for the same character that he played in the Australian version. Because the character was so crude, and because he would have to be in a dog suit, Gann originally did not want to play Wilfred. However, he felt that the character was very different from the Australian version, having many more sides, and overall being "more fun".

On more than one occasion, Gann suggested that part of the reason that the show had poor ratings in the United States was because it got bogged down in mythology and at times made comedy secondary. He stated, "Season Three, we really tried to steer it back closer to where we were Season One and make it really comedically satisfying. I really felt we achieved that, but it wasn't enough, I guess."

After the close of the final season in the United States, Gann considered returning to do a third Australian season.

=== Casting ===
The casting of Elijah Wood as Ryan was announced on June 29, 2010. Ryan is described as "an introverted and troubled young man struggling unsuccessfully to make his way in the world until he forms a unique friendship with Wilfred, his neighbor's canine pet". Series co-creator Jason Gann also reprises his role of the eponymous dog Wilfred, a character described by Zuckerman as being a mixed-breed dog who is "part Labrador Retriever and part Russell Crowe on a bender". Fiona Gubelmann stars as Jenna, Wilfred's owner and Ryan's next-door neighbor, who works as a local news producer. Dorian Brown was cast as Kristen, Ryan's controlling and condescending older sister.

=== Filming ===
The first season of Wilfred was shot using a DSLR, the Canon 7D, with a three-camera setup. The subsequent seasons were shot with a Nikon D800.

== Reception ==
Critical reception of the American adaptation of Wilfred was comparable to that of the original Australian series, with generally positive reviews.

On review aggregator website Rotten Tomatoes, the first season holds a 78% score, based on 41 reviews, with an average rating of 6.8/10. The website's critical consensus reads, "Wilfred is proudly vulgar and offensive, but a sentimental undertone lends the show some pleasing poignancy." The second season holds a score of 69%, based on 13 reviews, with an average rating of 7.4/10. The critical consensus reads, "Wilfred continues to be scaldingly funny with a deft humanistic touch but, like its titular character, it may be getting too coy with its narrative mind games." The third season holds an 86% score, with an average rating of 7.6/10, based on 14 reviews. The critical consensus reads, "Wilfred returns to a lackadaisical groove as its third season leans heavily on the combustible chemistry of Jason Gann and Elijah Wood, who both bring a hangdog charm." The fourth season holds a score of 100%, with an average rating of 7.8/10, based on 10 reviews. The critical consensus reads, "Wilfred rewards patient viewers with answers to its labyrinthine mythology during a final season that is harrowing, mind-bending, and ultimately moving."

Review aggregator website Metacritic gives Season 1 a weighted average score of 66 out of 100, based on reviews from 33 critics, indicating "generally favorable" reviews. Season 2 holds a score of 57 out of 100, based on five reviews, indicating "mixed or average" reviews.

Curt Wagner, writing in Redeye (The Chicago Tribune), said, "Stuffed with absurd situations and piles of bad taste, Wilfred is the strangest new show on TV. And the funniest."

David Wiegand of the San Francisco Chronicle wrote, "Wilfred works on many levels, something that may not become apparent until after you stop laughing."

Some of the less positive reviews included Mike Hale, who wrote in The New York Times, "Some shows aspire to cult status; this one goes straight there, practically bypassing the need to be broadcast at all," but concluded, "Gann's bits of doggie business ... are reliably humorous, but beyond that the show doesn't offer a lot of bark or bite."

Tom Gliatto of People magazine also gave a less positive review, calling the show "The Odd Couple redefined by psychosis and whimsy. I'm not wagging my tail."

The series premiere hit a positive note with viewers, and it became the highest-ranking debut sitcom in the history of FX Networks. It continued to remain in the top ten for Thursday night cable television shows throughout the first season. It was picked up for a second season on August 6, 2011. The second season aired from June 21 to September 20, 2012. On October 31, 2012, Wilfred was renewed for Season 3, which aired from June 20 to September 5, 2013. On October 2, Wilfred was renewed for a fourth season (its last), which aired from June 25 to August 13, 2014.

== Possible film ==
In an October 2013 interview, Jason Gann noted that a possible film is out of his hands, but that if fans want it, he could see the show coming back in a streaming capacity, much like Arrested Development. In a June 2014 interview, Gann stated that he and Elijah Wood would be interested in a Wilfred film "if the story is there..." As of 2026, the status of the film remains unknown.

== International broadcast ==
- Australia – Premiered on Eleven, June 28, 2011, in the Tuesday 9:30 p.m. timeslot, and currently repeated on The Comedy Channel in the Monday 9 p.m. slot. Season 3 screened on Eleven on Sundays at 10:30 p.m.
- Canada – Premiered on October 31, 2011, in the Thursday 10 p.m. timeslot, as an anchor title for the launch of the FX Canada network.
- Philippines – Premiered on Jack TV on March 20, 2012, in the 9 p.m. timeslot.
- United Kingdom – Premiered on BBC Three on August 16, 2011, in the 10:30 p.m. timeslot. Season 2 premiered on August 16, 2012, during the 10 p.m. timeslot, remaining on BBC Three.
- Israel – Premiered on yes Oh HD on April 29, 2012, in the 9:30 p.m. timeslot.
- Russia – Premiered on 2×2 on August 27, 2012.
- Portugal – Premiered on FX on February 13, 2012.
- Germany – Premiered on ProSieben Fun, February 24, 2013

== Russian adaptation ==
After winning awards at MIPCOM in 2013, Renegade Films sold the Wilfred concept to Russian producers. A third version was created for Russian networks retitled Charlie.
