= Yu-Gi-Oh! 5D's season 2 =

Yu-Gi-Oh! 5D's: Earthbound Immortals
- Season 2
- No. of episodes: 38

Release
- Original network: TV Tokyo
- Original release: October 1, 2008 – June 24, 2009

Season chronology
- ← Previous; Season 1 Next → Season 3

The second season of Yu-Gi-Oh! 5D's (with the title Earthbound Immortals for the English dub) runs from episodes 27 to 64. The story revolves around the battle between the united Signers, and the evil Dark Signers. The season uses two pieces of theme music; the opening theme is 'LAST TRAIN -Atarashii Asa-' (LAST TRAIN -新しい朝-) by knotlamp, whilst the ending theme is 'Cross-game' by Alice Nine.

The official Yu-Gi-Oh! YouTube channel and multiple DVDs combine the previous season and this season into one 64 episode season.

== Episode list ==
No. overall	No. in season	Title	Written by	Original release date	American air date
27	1	"A Web of Deceit, Part 1 / A World Without Light: Dark Synchro, Frozen Fitzgerald!"; Transliteration: "Hikarinaki Sekai Dāku Shinkuro Hyōketsu no Fittsujerarudo!" (Japanese: 光なき世界 ダークシンクロ 氷結のフィッツジェラルド!)	Yasuyuki Suzuki	October 1, 2008	May 16, 2009
After his victory over Jack in the Fortune Cup, Yusei is named the new Duel King. While Yanagi informs the gang about the Signers and the Crimson Dragon Marks, Yusei is challenged by a mysterious man with a dark purple spider-shaped mark on his arm, who is able to turn the duel into a Shadow Duel. Yusei is surprised to find his opponent has a fearsome new type of monster, a Dark Synchro Monster. Meanwhile, a reporter named Carly Carmine tries to get the scoop on the new Duel King.
28	2	"A Web of Deceit, Part 2 / The Darkness That Engulfs All: The Immortal Shadow Signer"; Transliteration: "Subete wo Nomikomu Yami Fumetsu no Dāku Shigunā" (Japanese: すべてを呑み込む闇 不滅のダークシグナー)	Koji Ueda	October 8, 2008	May 23, 2009
Despite the difficulties caused by the Dark Synchro Monster, Yusei manages to win his duel against the Dark Signer. However, after the duel, his opponent has no recollection of what happened and no longer has the Mark of the Spider or any Dark Synchro Monsters in his deck. It is revealed that spiders are being used to control people, one of which is heading to the hospital where Jack is recovering. Trudge arrives to take Yusei back to the Satellite, and Yusei decides to go, with the intention of getting the truth out of Goodwin.
29	3	"Good Cop, Bad Cop / A New Threat: Dark Signer Ushio??!"; Transliteration: "Samarikuru Kyōi Dāku Shigunā Ushio!?" (Japanese: 迫りくる脅威 ダークシグナー牛尾?!?)	Yasuyuki Suzuki	October 15, 2008	May 30, 2009
Following her release from security, Carly attends a premiere event and encounters a model named Misty Tredwell, who predicts her death. When Angela, a rival reporter, reveals Jack was actually born in the Satellite, Carly decides to infiltrate the hospital to interview Jack. At that time, a Dark Signer spider possesses Trudge and challenges Jack, who is trying to leave the hospital, to a duel. Unable to use his fractured right arm, Jack decides to use Carly as his arm. They win the duel, but Jack is weakened and asks Carly to get him out of there without anyone noticing. Meanwhile, Goodwin shows Yusei the truth.
30	4	"Fight or Flight / My Name is Crow! Fly, Black Bird"; Transliteration: "Wagana wa Kurō! Tobe Burakku Bādo" (Japanese: わが名はクロウ! 飛べブラック·バード)	Shin Yoshida	October 22, 2008	June 6, 2009
A Satellite rebel named Crow Hogan steals several decks for his friends. He is forced into a duel by Security, but manages to beat them with a one-turn kill. As Goodwin tells Yusei the truth about Signers and Dark Signers, Luna has a nightmare involving the dragons. Mina and Trudge show up at Carly's place where they find Jack, but he refuses to go with them. Yusei is then sent back to the Satellite where Crow awaits him.
31	5	"The Reunion Duel / Hometown and Friends: The Reuniting Tag Riding"; Transliteration: "Kokyō to Nakama Saikai no Taggu Raidingu" (Japanese: 故郷と仲間 再会のタッグライディング)	Koji Ueda	October 29, 2008	June 13, 2009
After catching up with each other and reuniting with Rally and co, Yusei and Crow are forced into a Turbo Duel with security using Tag Duel rules. Meanwhile, Carly accompanies Jack around the city whilst Mina and Trudge follow. Jack reminisces about his life in the Satellite, and the friends he betrayed. Following some advice from Carly, he decides to follow his own path.
32	6	"Dark Signs, Part 1 / The Symbol of Freedom, The Daedalus Bridge"; Transliteration: "Jiyū no Shōchō Daidarosu Buriji" (Japanese: 自由の象徴 ダイダロスブリッジ)	Masahiro Hikokubo	November 5, 2008	June 20, 2009
Rally and friends meet up with Yusei and Crow at his hideout, where Crow tells a story about the man who made the Daedalus Bridge. Later that night, whilst Yusei and Crow search for the Dark Signer's whereabouts, Kalin Kessler, a former friend of theirs, sends out a Dark birthmark signal, alerting Yusei and the other Signers. Jack and Carly are escorted by Mina to Yusei's whereabouts, where Carly learns that Yusei was born in Tops, and his parents were involved in the Zero Reverse incident. Kalin makes his appearance, trapping Yusei in a geoglyph shaped like the giant Nazca Lines, in the shape of The Giant, and forces him into a Shadow Turbo Duel.
33	7	"Dark Signs, Part 2 / Vengeful Inferno: My Former Friend, Kiryu Kyosuke"; Transliteration: "Fukushū no Gōka! Katsute no Tomo Kiryū Kyōsuke" (Japanese: 復讐の刧火! かっての友 鬼柳京介)	Yasuyuki Suzuki	November 12, 2008	June 27, 2009
While preparing for his duel against Kalin, Yusei, Crow and Jack remember when they were all part of a duel gang, the Enforcers, who duelled rival gangs at night. The duel starts and Yusei takes a harsh attack due to the effects of the Shadow duel, which appears to be more dangerous in Turbo Duel.
34	8	"Dark Signs, Part 3 / Dark Synchro! Come Forth, Hundred Eyes Dragon"; Transliteration: "Dāku Shinkuro! Ideyo Wan Handoreddo Ai Doragon" (Japanese: ダークシンクロ! いでよワンハンドレッド·アイ·ドラゴン)	Yasuyuki Suzuki	November 19, 2008	July 4, 2009
Kalin summons his Hundred Eyes Dragon, a Level -8 Dark Synchro monster, causing a real threat to Yusei. Yusei once again recalls his days in the Enforcers, and remembers how Kalin once saved his life. When he is almost burned in the fires of the dark barrier, Yusei also remembers when Kalin nearly killed a member of Security and how the proceeding fight between them sparked Kalin's hatred towards Yusei.
35	9	"Dark Signs, Part 4 / Terrifying! Earthbound Immortal Ccapac Apu"; Transliteration: "Senritsu! Jibakushin Kokapaku Apu" (Japanese: 戦慄! 地縛神コカパク·アプ)	Koji Ueda	November 26, 2008	July 11, 2009
Yusei defeats Hundred Eyes Dragon using Stardust Dragon, but Kalin summons a powerful monster, an Earthbound Immortal, called 'Ccapac Apu' using the souls of all the captured Satellite inhabitants, unfazed by attacks from Monsters, Spells or Traps. Before it can attack, Yusei's Duel Runner gives out and crashes, ending the duel. However, Yusei is impaled by a shard in his abdomen and is taken to a local "doctor" in Satellite by Crow. Meanwhile, Yusei's friends try to retrieve his broken Duel Runner while staving off Satellite thieves.
36	10	"Supersensory Shakedown / Docking of Courage and Power! Synchro Summon, Power Tool Dragon"; Transliteration: "Yūki to Chikara wo Dokkingu! Shinkuro Shōkan! Pawā Tsūru Doragon" (Japanese: 勇気と力をドッキング! シンクロ召喚! パワー·ツール·ドラゴン)	Shin Yoshida	December 3, 2008	July 27, 2009 (Online); August 11, 2009 (TV)
As Yusei recovers from his operation, Leo assumes he is the Fifth Signer since his monster, Power Tool Dragon, apparently appeared in Luna's dream. He comes up with the idea of recruiting Akiza to fight the Dark Signers and goes with Luna, Tanner and Yanagi to visit Sayer in order to see her. However Sayer gasses them, and has his own plans of recruiting Luna into the Arcadia Movement, locking up Tanner and Yanagi and forcing Leo into a duel. Leo temporarily gains the upper hand by summoning Power Tool Dragon, but is then defeated by Sayer's Synchro Monster and is knocked unconscious by his psychic abilities.
37	11	"Digging Deeper, Part 1 / Infiltration! Arcadia Movement, Therefore it's My Turn!"; Transliteration: "Sennyū! Arukadia Mūbumento Watashi no Tān Nandakara!" (Japanese: 潜入! アルカディアムーブメント 私のターンなんだから!)	Shin Yoshida	December 10, 2008	July 27, 2009 (Online); August 12, 2009 (TV)
Jack decides to return with Mina to the city to retrieve his Duel Runner. He thinks it is too dangerous for Carly to get involved but promises to tell her everything when it's all over. Carly, wanting to maintain her contact with Jack, decides to look into Akiza and the Arcadia Movement, and finds out Misty is somehow linked to them and goes to meet her. She reveals that Akiza was apparently responsible for the death of her younger brother. Meanwhile Akiza informs Luna that she is to stay with the Arcadia Movement. Luna contacts the Ancient Fairy Dragon for help, and is informed her servant 'Regulus' will come to help her. Despite warning from Misty, Carly decides to infiltrate the Arcadia Movement, and finds some information about Goodwin that gives them control over Security. However, she is discovered by Sayer and is challenged to a duel. She is defeated by Sayer's Psychic Monsters and is sent plummeting through a window.
38	12	"Digging Deeper, Part 2 / Resurrected Soul: The New Geoglyph Ablaze"; Transliteration: "Yomigaerishi Tamashī Moesakaru Aratana Jiogurifu" (Japanese: 蘇りし魂 燃えさかる新たなジオグリフ)	Shin Yoshida	December 17, 2008	July 27, 2009 (Online); August 13, 2009 (TV)
Carly Carmine, who has been thrown off the Arcadia Movement building to her death as a result of her Duel with Sayer, has come back to life as a Dark Signer, seeking revenge. Misty Tredwell, after sensing that Carly has fully become a Dark Signer, goes to the Arcadia Movement to duel Akiza Izinski, desiring revenge of her own. Meanwhile, Jack sets out, intending to help Akiza in her duel, and not knowing that Carly had become a Dark Signer.
39	13	"Digging Deeper, Part 3 / Descend! Two Earthbound Immortals"; Transliteration: "Kōrin! Nitai no Jibakushin" (Japanese: 降臨！2体の地縛神)	Shin Yoshida	December 24, 2008	July 27, 2009 (Online); August 14, 2009 (TV)
During their duel, Misty informs Akiza that she is responsible for the death of her younger brother, which Akiza denies. Tanner and Yanagi rescue Luna and Leo from their imprisonment, and discover the two duelists along the way. A barrier coming from Luna's birthmark protects the others as countless souls are sacrificed when Misty summons her Earthbound Immortal, Ccarayhua. Greiger, who was under police transportation, is set free by Devack. Meanwhile Carly summons her Earthbound Immortal, Aslla Piscu, and sends Sayer tumbling down the building, the aftershock of which prematurely ends Akiza's duel. Jack arrives and rescues Akiza from the wreckage, but is unable to find Carly after he notices her broken glasses lying on the floor. Following her duel, Carly becomes aware of what she had done and feels deep guilt, remorse and regret for it, before being picked up by Misty and Devack.
40	14	"Clash of the Dragons, Part 1 / Irreversible Past: A Locked Heart's Door"; Transliteration: "Modorenai Kako Tozasareta Kokoro no Tobira" (Japanese: 戻れない過去 閉ざされた心の扉)	Yasuyuki Suzuki	January 7, 2009	July 30, 2009 (Online); August 17, 2009 (TV)
Akiza is taken to hospital where her parents, Hideo and Setsuka, meet up with Jack, Leo and Luna. Jack tells them that the only one who can save Akiza is Yusei, so Hideo travels to Satellite to talk with him. He tells him that when Akiza was young, he was unable to spend time with her due to work. When they finally were able to spend some free time together, a call from work interrupted, which frustrated Akiza and awoke her Crimson Dragon Signer abilities and Mark of the Claw, hurting her father in the process. The relationship between the two, and Akiza's life, fell apart after that. Yusei agrees to help and goes to visit her in hospital, waking her with his birthmark. When she awakes she is angry that her parents were there, but then remembers what had happened to Sayer, the only person she had ever trusted. Unable to reason with Yusei, she decides to duel him, summoning out her Black Rose Dragon in the process.
41	15	"Clash of the Dragons, Part 2 / Hatred Caused by Sorrow! Catch it, Stardust Dragon"; Transliteration: "Kanashimi Yue no Zō-o! Uketomero Sutādasuto Doragon" (Japanese: 悲しみ故の憎悪! 受け止めろスターダスト·ドラゴン)	Yasuyuki Suzuki	January 14, 2009	July 30, 2009 (Online); August 18, 2009 (TV)
Enduring the pain of Akiza's attacks, Yusei summons Stardust Dragon to face against Black Rose Dragon and reach her heart. Still hurt by the loss of Sayer, Akiza unleashes her full power and constantly weakens Stardust Dragon. As Yusei gets hit by more attacks, Hideo steps in to protect him and try and reach Akiza, taking some damage in the process. During the chaos caused by her spells, she notices a wayward debris about to hit Hideo, and whilst calling out to him, she manages to stop her powers and save him. Being thankful he is safe, Akiza hugs her father and asks Yusei to finish the duel. With Akiza finally accepting Yusei's friendship, the four Signers are united.
42	16	"The Signs of Time / Gather! Warriors of the Crimson Dragon"; Transliteration: "Shūketsu! Akaki Ryū no Senshi-tachi" (Japanese: 集結! 赤き竜の戦士たち)	Koji Ueda	January 21, 2009	July 18, 2009
Before visiting Goodwin, Mina shows Akiza the true nature of the Arcadia Movement, showing how they performed experiments on young children in order to raise Psychic Duelists. Yusei, Jack, Akiza, Luna and Leo go to Goodwin in order to get the truth. Goodwin almost denies Leo entry, since he is not a Signer, but Luna insists that he stay with them. Goodwin explains to them all about the Crimson Dragon and the Dark Signers, and he mentions that the fifth Signer has yet to be awakened, and reveals that four Dark Signers are those who have already died and cannot return to normal, much to the shock of everyone. He leaves everyone to decide whether or not they will fight the cause.
43	17	"Surely, You Jest, Part 1 / Respective Determination! That Which is Wholeheartedly Believable"; Transliteration: "Sorezore no Ketsui Kokoro kara Shinjirareru Mono" (Japanese: それぞれの決意! 心から信じられるもの)	Koji Ueda	January 28, 2009	July 25, 2009
The Signers contemplate about what Goodwin had told them. Yusei blames himself for Kalin becoming a Dark Signer, but Jack knocks some sense into him. Leo is reluctant to join Luna in going to the Satellite, since his battle with Sayer proved he wasn't a worthy hero, but Luna manages to convince him otherwise. Meanwhile, Crow encounters Lazar in the Satellite, mistaking him for a Dark Signer and goes after him. Despite Lazar proving he wasn't one, Crow attaches the explosive latch onto his duel disk and challenges him to a duel. Lazar gains the upper hand by playing a continuous trap that forbids Synchro Summoning, and summoning Jester Lord, whose strength and power greatly increases when there are spell or trap cards on the field.
44	18	"Surely, You Jest, Part 2 / Stir up the Divine Winds! Blackwing Armed Wing"; Transliteration: "Kamikaze wo Makiokose! Burakku Fezā Āmuzu Wingu" (Japanese: 神風を巻き起こせ! ブラックフェザー·アームズ·ウィング)	Koji Ueda	February 4, 2009	August 1, 2009
Crow manages to regain some ground in his duel against Lazar with his monster, Blackwing Armed Wing, but just then, a purple light shines from the Original Ener-D Reactor, within a crater Lazar was investigating, and a black fog starts to envelope Satellite. Whilst Lazar manages to escape, Crow gets caught up in the fog and disappears, along with several other Satellite citizens. Meanwhile, chaos ensues outside the Security and Maintenance HQ as citizens demand an explanation from Goodwin concerning the geoglyphs and disappearing people. When the Signers hear about the fog, they head off towards the Satellite. When waiting for the helicopter, the others learn that Yusei is the son of Professor Fudo, researcher of the Old momentum. Before leaving, Yusei asks Goodwin to promise to finish construction of the Daedalus Bridge once the mission is over.
45	19	"Mark of the Spider, Part 1 / Confrontation! The Man with the Mark of the Spider!"; Transliteration: "Taiketsu! Kumo no Aza wo Motsu Otoko" (Japanese: 対決! 蜘蛛の痣をもつ男)	Yasuyuki Suzuki	February 11, 2009	August 8, 2009
While flying to the Satellite Akiza asks about Yusei's father and Mina explains to everyone what his father did. She also explains what happened 17 years ago and that Yusei is city born. Yusei, Jack, Akiza, Leo, Luna, Mina and Trudge arrive Martha's house where she and Blister are waiting. Martha informs everyone that Crow, Rally and the others have gone missing, and offers everyone a meal. Mina asks Jack if the reason for coming to Satellite was for Carly, Jack just insists that he thinks of her as a friend. Since Trudge's plans on wooing Mina fails as a result, Martha sets him to work in the kitchen and bathroom in order to cure his heartbreak, and he starts to gain an appreciation for Satellite residents from a child named Taka who admires Security. However, in the middle of their meal, Roman makes his appearance and Yusei accepts his challenge, with Akiza going to assist. Martha takes everyone to hiding, but Taka and his friends decide to go after Yusei to help fight. As Martha and Trudge go look for them, the duel between Roman and Yusei begins, with Roman summoning a Dark Synchro Monster that can capture an opponent's monster and use it to negate damage, and Yusei summoning his Synchro Monster, Road Warrior. However, just as they become aware that the children had followed them, Roman makes plans for summoning his Earthbound Immortal, putting the children's souls at risk.
46	20	"Mark of the Spider, Part 2 / The Truth from Seventeen Years Ago, The Hidden Trap of the Dark Signers"; Transliteration: "Jūnananen Mae no Shinjitsu Kakusareta Dāku Shigunā no Wana" (Japanese: 17年前の真実 隠されたダークシグナーの罠)	Yasuyuki Suzuki	February 18, 2009	August 15, 2009
As Roman prepares for his Earthbound Immortal summoning, Yusei tries his best to postpone it and Martha and Trudge hurry to save the children. However, Roman then speeds up the process and is able to summon his Earthbound Immortal, Uru. Thankfully, Jack arrives on time and forms a barrier around the children to stop their souls being sacrificed. Roman then reveals that not only was he an assistant to Yusei's father, but is also Goodwin's brother and the one responsible for the Zero Reverse incident. Yusei manages to deflect one of Uru's attack, but it hits a building Taka, Martha and Trudge were hiding in. In the process of rescuing Taka, Martha falls into the flames of the geoglyph and her soul is fed to the Earthbound Immortal. Yusei summons Stardust Dragon and takes note of the fact that whilst Earthbound Immortals can't be stopped with traps, spells or monsters, they can't be used to defend either. Roman manages to avoid being attacked, but then he swaps himself out with Rally, who sacrifices himself by synchro summoning One Shot Cannon and beating Uru. With life points at zero, Rally disappears.
47	21	"Mark of the Monkey, Part 1 / The Man with the Mark of the Monkey"; Transliteration: "Saru no Chijōe no Aza wo Motsu Otoko" (Japanese: 猿の地上絵の痣を持つ男)	Shin Yoshida	February 25, 2009	August 22, 2009
The Dark Signers show up to taunt the Signers following Yusei's duel with Roman. Devack introduces himself and reveals he is in possession of Ancient Fairy Dragon and challenges Luna to come get it. Roman announces that their duels will take place at the four "stars of destiny". Whilst chasing after them, Jack discovers that one of the Dark Signers is Carly, who tells him to find her if he wants to know what happened. Back at Martha's house, the children are blaming themselves for her sacrifice, but Yusei promises the children he will be able to bring everyone back after defeating the Dark Signers, even though he is uncertain if that will actually happen. Mina discusses the whereabouts of the four control unit locations, and reveals that Goodwin received the legendary dragons from Professor Fudo, and put them into circulation where they eventually came across their current owners. Yusei decides to face Kalin, Jack decides to go confront Carly, Akiza heads towards Misty with Mina, and Luna, Leo and Trudge head towards where Devack is. Whilst on the way there, Luna gets contacted by Kuribon and is transported to the World of Duel Monster Spirits. When Leo goes looking for her, he encounters Devack. Whilst he is uninterested in dueling someone who isn't a Signer, Leo challenges him anyway, hoping to defeat him so Luna won't have to. Yusei returns and watches the match with Trudge, as Devack gains a lead with his monkey deck.
48	22	"Mark of the Monkey, Part 2 / Minus World, Search for the White Lion Regulus"; Transliteration: "Mainasu Wārudo Shiroki Shishi Regurusu wo Sagase" (Japanese: マイナスワールド 白き獅子レグルスを探せ)	Koji Ueda	March 4, 2009	August 26, 2009
As Luna reaches a town in the Spirit Realm, she notices that its inhabitants are running frightened, and gravity is behaving oddly. She is discovered by a group of monkey soldiers, who imprison her card spirits in stone tablets with minus levels. She is rescued by a young mage named Torunka, who decides to help Luna find Regulus, the servant Ancient Fairy Dragon spoke of. Meanwhile, Leo continues his duel with Devack, managing to summon his Power Tool Dragon to gain the lead. However, when Devack summons his Dark Synchro Monster and activates a field spell, Yusei fears that he is preparing to summon his Earthbound Immortal. Back in the Spirit Realm, Zeman the Ape King, attempts to turn Ancient Fairy Dragon into a Minus Monster, but fails. Luna and Torunka find Regulus, but he is not looking very friendly.
49	23	"Mark of the Monkey, Part 3 / The King That Rules Over Minus, Demonic Monkey King Zeman"; Transliteration: "Mainasu wo Tsukasadoru Ō Enmaō Zēman" (Japanese: マイナスをつかさどる王 猿魔王ゼーマン)	Koji Ueda	March 11, 2009	August 27, 2009
As Luna and Torunka manage to find Regulus, Luna notices he has a Minus Staff stuck in his leg, causing him to hear the opposite of what Luna says and become distrustful of her. Luna manages to steal one of the foot soldier's Minus Staffs to negate the one on Regulus, and when he notices she is a Signer, he decides to help them. Devack has summoned Zeman the Ape King, and Leo is struggling to make a comeback, but he notices Power Tool Dragon is trying to protect him. Back in the Spirit Realm, Zeman's spirit uses the strength and power of the minused monsters he captured to start turning the sun minus, causing the surroundings to revert and Torunka and Luna to become younger. Regulus comes up with a plan to disguise Luna as a wizard and pretend to have captured him in order to trick Zeman into removing Ancient Fairy Dragon's seal.
50	24	"Mark of the Monkey, Part 4 / Curse of Minus Spell! The Imprisoned Ancient Fairy Dragon"; Transliteration: "Mainasu no Noroi! Torawareta Enshento Fearī Doragon" (Japanese: マイナスの呪い! 捕らわれたエンシェント·フェアリードラゴン)	Koji Ueda	March 18, 2009	August 27, 2009
Luna's plan to free Ancient Fairy Dragon is hampered, when the Minus Staff she was carrying gets revealed, causing Torunka to accidentally blurt out their plans. Regulus manages to destroy Zeman, who is simultaneously destroyed by Leo in the real world, but not before Zeman transfers the power of the minus curse to Devack. This returns Torunka to his normal age, but doesn't free Ancient Fairy Dragon, or the minused spirits. Devack then sacrifises those spirits to summon his Earthbound Immortal, Cusillu, and Leo barely manages to survive the attack. Torunka and Regulus return Luna to the real world, where she takes over for Leo and starts to get the better of Cusillu. Devack then activates the effect of the Dark Jungle Field Spell, which raises Cusillu's attack points from 2,500, to 3,600. Devack manages to summon Ancient Fairy Dragon to the field, but trapped, with the intent of hindering Luna, but she manages to return her to her side of the field with the help of Regulus, and then she frees Ancient Fairy Dragon from her imprisonment. Using Ancient Dragon's ability to destroy field spells and recover life points, Luna manages to turn the duel in her favor.
51	25	"A Whale of a Ride, Part 1 / Be Resurrected! The Boundary Surpassing Riding Duel"; Transliteration: "Tenseiseyo! Genkai Toppa no Raidingu Dyueru" (Japanese: 転生せよ! 限界突破のライディング·デュエル)	Shin Yoshida	March 25, 2009	August 28, 2009
Leo and Luna defeat Devack, which results in the destruction of Cusillu, and frees all of the trapped duel monster spirits that were absorbed by Earthbound Immortal. But Devack is still there, and chases Leo and Luna, as he tries to bring them into the netherworld with him before he disappears. But Devack fails, and he disapprears himself, just before he gets them. Ancient Fairy Dragon and Regulus give their thanks to Luna, and become cards in her deck. Luna places the Ancient Fairy Dragon card in the control unit, inside of the tower that Devack was guarding, which deactivates it, and it lowers into the ground, until it disappears completely from view. Making sure everyone is safe, Yusei decides to head towards Kalin. Hearing about Devack's defeat, Roman sways Greiger over to his side, and executes him, by dropping him into the Ener-D reactor, in order to transform him into a Dark Signer. As Roman continues to talk to Greiger, he is then convinced that Roman was right, and then, he becomes a Dark Signer. Meanwhile, Crow, who had escaped the black fog by hiding in a fridge, is shocked to discover the entire Satellite has gone missing. He heads towards Kalin for revenge, but ends up running into Greiger. Crow challenges him to a turbo duel without auto pilot, knowing that the only way to avoid an Earthbound Immortal's attack is to maneuver around it. When Yusei notices that a new geoglyph had appeared in the sky, and it wasn't a Signer dueling, he goes over to investigate. Crow uses his riding skills to get the first turn. However, Greiger's first attack runs him off the road.
52	26	"A Whale of a Ride, Part 2 / At the Ends of the Emotions Spun by the Cards"; Transliteration: "Kādo ga Tsumugu Omoi no Hate ni" (Japanese: カードが紡ぐ想いの果てに)	Shin Yoshida	April 1, 2009	August 28, 2009
Crow uses his Duel Runner's modifications to survive Greiger's attack. Yusei decides to jump into the geoglyph in order to discover who was dueling, and is shocked to find Greiger is a Dark Signer. Yusei tries to calm both of them down, but neither refuse to let up. Crow recalls that he had no friends when his father died, but thanks to finding some Duel Monster cards, he was able to learn how to read and make friends with other duelists, including Yusei and Jack, and soon grew to take care of others in the same way. Filled with sorrow for his friends disappearing, Crow begs Yusei to let them continue their duel, which he agrees to. Greiger summons his Flying Fortress Sky Fire, but Crow retaliates by using a tuner monster's special ability to Synchro Summon Black Wing Armor Master, from the graveyard, and uses its abilities to destroy his monster. Greiger recovers from the attack, thanks to his reinforced Duel Runner, summons his Dark Synchro Monster.
53	27	"A Whale of a Ride, Part 3 / Gust Fiercely, Winds: Lone Silver Wind of the Black Feathers"; Transliteration: "Fukisusabe Arashi Burakku Fezā Kokō no Shirubā Windo" (Japanese: 吹きすさべ嵐 ブラックフェザー孤高のシルバー·ウィンド)	Shin Yoshida	April 8, 2009	December 22, 2009 (Online); March 2, 2010 (TV)
Greiger summons his Dark Synchro, which is Dark Flat Top, which allows him to special summon another Flying Fortress SKY FIRE, and then attacks Crow with it, which reduces Crow's life points to down 100. Crow crashes, but remains determined to win, and gets back into the game. Using a pot luck with his trap, he manages to defeat both monsters, but this in turn, allows Greiger to summon his Earthbound Immortal, Chacu Challhua. Crow manages to Synchro Summon Blackwing – Silverwind the Ascendant, and prepares to destroy Chacu Challua with its special ability, but then, he, Yusei, and Greiger notice that the souls used for its Chacu Challhua's summoning were the people of his village, and Greiger's siblings. Realizing it was the Dark Signer's fault, and not Goodwin's, Greiger wants to stop the duel, but the Earthbound Immortal refuses to give up, and takes over his body. As he struggles to regain control, Greiger asks Crow to finish the battle. Crow manages to defeat Chacu Challhua, freeing all the children, but the resulting impact causes the environment to collapse, and Greiger rams into him in order to save him from a falling piece of wreckage. Before he disappears, he asks Crow to look after his siblings and Yusei to beat the Dark Signers. With things settled, Yusei once again heads toward Kalin.
54	28	"A Score to Settle, Part 1 / Last Duel! Team Satisfaction"; Transliteration: "Rasto Dyueru! Chīmu Satisufakushon" (Japanese: ラストデュエル! チームサティスファクション)	Yasuyuki Suzuki	April 15, 2009	December 22, 2009 (Online); March 4, 2010 (TV)
Yusei finally catches up with Kalin and start what Kalin calls 'The Last Duel of the Enforcers'. Yusei hopes that this duel will rekindle their friendship. After the Enforcers took over the Satellite, Kalin kept looking for enemies. When those enemies started including young kids, Crow and Jack left the team, leaving just Kalin and Yusei. When Security shows up in Satellite with Duel Runners and Kalin plans on destroying them, Yusei also quits the team. Kalin decides to attack Security, getting their attention by blowing up some confiscated Duel Disks. When Yusei, Jack and Crow catch wind of Kalin's actions, they go to look for him and find him cornered in a building ready to stand off against Security. Back in the present, Kalin summons his Hundred Eyes Dragon and begins to utilize his Handless combo.
55	29	"A Score to Settle, Part 2 / Companions' Sincerity, Majestic Dragon – Savior Dragon"; Transliteration: "Nakama-tachi no Omoi, Kyūseiryū Seivā Doragon" (Japanese: 仲間達の想い, 救世竜セイヴァー·ドラゴン)	Yasuyuki Suzuki	April 22, 2009	January 12, 2010 (Online); March 5, 2010 (TV)
Yusei defeats Hundred Eyes Dragon, but is fully aware that it allows Kalin to draw his Earthbound Immortal to his hand. Back in the last days of the Enforcers, in a flash-back of Yusei's memories, Yusei, Jack and Crow try to talk sense into Kalin, and they all end up running away from Sector Security. One Sector Security officer pins down Kalin, but he manages to jump on his Duel Runner, causing him to crash with a bad head injury. He tries to finish him off but Yusei stops him. Yusei tries to pose as the leader of the Enforcers in order to protect Kalin, but the chief of Sector Security at that time had already figured it out that Kalin was the real leader of the enforcers, and Kalin becomes furious when he sees his hand on Yusei's shoulder, thinking Yusei had ratted him out. Kalin then gets harsh treatment in prison, losing his deck, and he was eventually convinced by the voice of Roman to become a Dark Signer. Back in the present, Kalin summons his Earthbound Immortal – Ccapac Apu, but Yusei manages to cancel out the attack and summons Stardust Dragon. Ccapac Apu attacks again, and the shockwaves almost send Kalin himself into the wall of purple flames, and Yusei reaches his hand for him. The power from all the Signers' marks transfer into Yusei, and he gains the Seal of the Crimson Dragon, which grants him a Tuner monster, Majestic Dragon, which appears in his deck, allowing him to summon Majestic Star Dragon and end the duel. Kalin finally forgives Yusei as he disappears into dust.
56	30	"Destiny's Will, Part 1 / The 17-Year Old Vow: The Destiny Guided by Momentum"; Transliteration: "Jūnananenmae no Chikai Mōmento ga Michibiku Unmei" (Japanese: 17年前の誓い モーメントが導く運命)	Shin Yoshida	April 29, 2009	January 12, 2010 (Online); March 8, 2010 (TV)
With Kalin and Ccapac Apu defeated, all the Satellite residents are returned. Just then, Roman uses one of his dark spiders to possess Trudge and talk to Yusei, coaxing him to find him at the Original Ener-D Reactor, challenging him to a duel. Lazar is seen talking to a mysterious figure. Goodwin goes to meet with Roman. Roman is shown with a shadow duel disk, and challenges Goodwin to a duel, as part of a promise they made. Yusei, Luna, Leo, and Trudge traverse down the crater, whilst Crow, who notices the army helicopters, takes a different route. Yusei encounters Roman on a bridge, who activates an explosion, causing a flux of Ener-D to appear underneath them. They start to duel and Yusei manages to attack Roman with Junk Warrior, although this in turn allows Roman to summon Earthbound Immortal Uru. Roman continues to put pressure on Yusei and manages to bring his life points down to 100.
57	31	"Destiny's Will, Part 2 / Darkness of the Heart, the Last Hope Remaining"; Transliteration: "Kokoro no Yami Nokosareta Saigo no Kibō" (Japanese: 心の闇 残された最後の希望)	Shin Yoshida	May 6, 2009	January 12, 2010 (Online); March 9, 2010 (TV)
After bringing Yusei's life points down to 50, Roman begins to tell him of what happened 17 years ago between him, Rex and Yusei's father. They were working on the Original Energy Reactor, but Professor Fudo wanted to stop the project when it started to look unstable. Roman had decided to travel to the Nazca Lines, where he encountered a mysterious person, claiming to be from Yliaster, who knows about Roman's birthmark. The mysterious man convinces Roman to look into the light coming from the reactor, where he is struck by dark energy and is shown the history of the Earthbound Immortals and the mighty powerful Crimson Dragon. Meanwhile, Crow finds Rex, who explains that Professor Fudo was betrayed by Roman. He shows off four Dragon cards, but Professor Fudo manages to escape with three of them, but got severely injured in the process and entrusts the cards to Rex. Rex goes to confront Roman, who had severed his birthmark arm and given it to Rex Goodwin, telling him that he should unite the Signers and then come back to defeat him. He then overloads the Original Ener-D Reactor, after causing it rotate backwards, causing Zero Reverse to occur, and transforming Roman Goodwin into a Dark Signer, and results in the separation of Satellite from New Domino City. This kills Professor Fudo and Yusei's mother in the process, but not before he was able to get the infant Yusei to safety. Back in the present, Yusei manages to bring out Stardust Dragon, and after a series of counter traps from both sides, Yusei manages to defeat Roman. However, Roman warns him that if the signers don't seal all of the four control towers on time, then the King of the Netherworld would resurrect at sunset, and then he self-destructs the bridge using a device in his mechanical arm, causing the bridge to collapse, which causes Yusei to fall into the Ener-D pool.
58	32	"Shadows of Doubt, Part 1 / Ahead Is My Destiny! The High Ruler of Hell, The Dark King"; Transliteration: "Sono Saki ni Aru Unmei! Jigoku no Hasha Dāku Kingu" (Japanese: その先にある運命! 地獄の覇者ダークキング)	Koji Ueda	May 13, 2009	February 22, 2010 (Online); March 10, 2010 (TV)
With Roman's defeat, all the Satellite citizens, including Martha and Rally, are returned. Jack finally meets up with Carly, but she is reluctant to be helped and challenges Jack to a Turbo Duel. Initially, Jack is reluctant to fight and takes a lot of damage, but he starts to fight back, as he does not believe Carly is a person who would hurt people. Carly traps Jack in a vision where he is transformed into a Dark Signer by Carly and becomes destined to destroy the Crimson Dragon by her side. However, noticing Carly's glasses, Jack breaks free of this vision, and decides to fight for what Carly truly desires. Meanwhile, Yusei finds himself in a strange place surrounded by the spirits of those who died in the Zero Reverse incident. Due to Yusei's connection to the incident, they start to attack him, but he is rescued by a strong white light and the voice of a familiar figure.
59	33	"Shadows of Doubt, Part 2 / The Lone Light, Savior Demon Dragon"; Transliteration: "Kokō no Hikari Seivā Demon Doragon" (Japanese: 孤高の光 セイヴァー·デモン·ドラゴン)	Koji Ueda	May 20, 2009	February 22, 2010 (Online); March 11, 2010 (TV)
Jack activates a Trap that lets Carly choose the outcome. He manages to break through to Carly and she makes the right choice. However, the Earthbound Immortal takes over her body, forcing her to continue the duel. Jack brings out his Red Dragon Archfiend in the hopes of freeing her. Meanwhile, the mysterious spirit reveals himself to be Yusei's father, who returns him to the real world. Carly summons out her Earthbound Immortal – Aslla Piscu, but Jack manages to stop its attack. Jack expresses his feelings for Carly, and then he takes the marks of the other Signers, giving him the Seal of the Crimson Dragon. Hearing the real Carly's pleas to end the duel, despite his objections, Jack synchro summons Majestic Red Dragon. Jack hopes to end the duel in a tie, taking him down with her, so that he can still be with her, but Carly activates a trap card so that only she would lose. Jack is able to do nothing but hold Carly tight, as she disappears into the Netherworld.
60	34	"Truth and Consequences, Part 1 / Sad Story – Sorrowful Memories"; Transliteration: "Saddo Sutōrī Kanashimi no Kioku" (Japanese: サッド·ストーリー〜悲しみの記憶〜)	Tadashi Hayakawa	May 27, 2009	February 22, 2010 (Online); March 12, 2010 (TV)
Akiza and Mina arrive at an abandoned amusement park where Ccarayhua's control unit is, shortly followed by Yusei's group, and a man claiming to be sent by Goodwin. Misty traps Akiza in a Hall of Mirrors, actually dueling her through the mirrors. She uses cards that block off drawing cards from the deck, and also shows Akiza the events involving Misty and her brother, Toby, who apparently met her at Arcadia Movement. Yusei is led to a room where Mina is found unconscious and is attacked by the man who turns out to be Sayer, who had survived his duel with Carly, and is determined to reclaim Akiza. He uses his psychic abilities to knock Yusei in a cage with Mina as it slowly fills with water. Trudge eventually finds them and tries to free them. Akiza is shown the moment where Toby was killed, which led Misty to become depressed and crash her car, transforming her into a Dark Signer. Akiza refuses to fight back and almost falls on a shard of glass, but is saved by Sayer, who whispers something in Akiza's ear that causes her to reawaken her dormant physic powers and summons Black Rose Dragon, which shatters all the mirrors, destroying the illusion, which reveals Misty's real location.
61	35	"Truth and Consequences, Part 2 / At the End of the Truth"; Transliteration: "Shinjitsu no Hate ni" (Japanese: 真実の果てに)	Tadashi Hayakawa	June 3, 2009	March 15, 2010
With Akiza's dormant physic abilities fully awakened, Misty activates her geoglyph. Trudge manages to free Yusei and Mina and Yusei goes to join Luna and Leo. Learning about Akiza's current state, Yusei goes to face Sayer, who reveals he is controlling her mind and was responsible for Toby's death. Misty summons out her Earthbound Immortal Ccarayhua. Sayer talks about the experiments he performed on Toby seeing that he did not have ultimate psychic powers sent him to an unknown location that not even he knows about. However, Yusei revealed he had activated an intercom on his duel disk, letting Misty know what Sayer had told him. Angered, Misty gets Ccarayhua to eat him, freeing Akiza from her trance. Misty apologizes to Akiza, but the Earthbound Immortal forces her to continue dueling. Akiza defeats her, setting her free, which results in her being sent to the netherworld. The New Domino City residents return, but a Dark Signer mark, the mark of the Condor appears in the sky.
62	36	"Signs of Doom, Part 1 / Last Battle! The Man with Two Marks"; Transliteration: "Saigo no Tatakai! Futatsu no Kami wo Motsu Otoko" (Japanese: 最後の戦い! 2つの神をもつ男)	Yasuyuki Suzuki	June 10, 2009	March 16, 2010
As the Condor geoglyph shines in the sky, a massive monster emerges from the Original Ener-D Reactor and heads towards the Condor geoglyph over New Domino City, which was the King of the Netherworld. The Crimson Dragon appears and sends everyone to the front of a temple (the Altar of the Dragon Star), where they find Goodwin, who reveals himself to be a Dark Signer. Then, he transfers Roman's mark of the Dragon Head from a canister to his left arm, destroying the metallic arm that was covering it at the same time. He challenges Yusei, Jack and Crow to a Turbo Duel in the air. Goodwin reveals that he lost the duel with Roman prior to his battle with Yusei on purpose, and became a Dark Signer in order to end the pointless cycle. He summons out both a Synchro monster; Sun Dragon Inti, and its Dark Synchro counterpart; Moon Dragon Quilla. He also reveals he was the Legendary turbo duelist who constructed and flew across the Daedalus Bridge. Crow manages to destroy Sun Dragon Inti, whose special ability then causes Crow to take damage equal to Blackwing Elfin the Raven's attack points, and due to Sun Dragon Inti's temporary destruction, Moon Dragon Quilla then resurrects from Goodwin's graveyard. Then, Goodwin uses his Mark of the Dragon Head to steal all of the Signers' marks, and then he gains the Seal of the Crimson Dragon himself.
63	37	"Signs of Doom, Part 2 / The Strongest Earthbound Immortal! Wiraqocha Rasca!"; Transliteration: "Saikyō no Jibakushin! Wirakocharasuka" (Japanese: 最強の地縛神! ウィラコチャラスカ!)	Yasuyuki Suzuki	June 17, 2009	March 17, 2010
After being dealt some direct damage due to the cooperative efforts of Yusei, Jack and Crow, Goodwin is able to summon his Earthbound Immortal – Wiraqocha Rasca, absorbing the souls of New Domino City. Then, the King of the Netherworld spouts forth several beasts that attempt to attack the players. However, they are saved by Black Rose Dragon and Ancient Fairy Dragon. Crow sacrifices himself by playing a trap card in order to protect Yusei from Wiraqocha Rasca's special ability, and falls unconscious. Goodwin coaxes Jack into attacking him, but after he gives in and loses some life points, Goodwin's statement of becoming a dark signer causes Jack to remember what Carly taught him and decides not to do things his old fashioned way anymore. Goodwin laughs at the idea of the bonds of true friendship and love, saying that destiny is all that there is.
64	38	"Signs of Doom, Part 3 / Towards Our Future!"; Transliteration: "Oretachi no Mirai e!" (Japanese: オレたちの未来へ!)	Yasuyuki Suzuki	June 24, 2009	March 18, 2010
Goodwin reduces Jack's life points to 1, and gets the King of the Netherworld to attack him, causing him to crash. Yusei's life points get reduced to 1 too, before he summons his Stardust Dragon and takes advantage of the traps Crow and Jack placed beforehand. As Yusei tries to reach Goodwin, which he successfully does, he regains the Signers' marks from him. Furthermore, Yusei gains Roman's mark of the Dragon Head, and the mark of the Tail that Yusei used to have transfers over to Crow. Yusei then takes the marks of the other 4 Signers, and gains the Seal of the Crimson Dragon. Then, he summons the Majestic Star Dragon and destroys Earthbound Immortal Wiraqocha Rasca, which defeats Goodwin. Then, the Crimson Dragon envelops the Majestic Star Dragon, infusing it with the power of the Crimson Dragon, and dives into the King of the Netherworld. Yusei then sees a vision where he and the Goodwin brothers are inside the King of the Netherworld, and he sees all of the Dark Signers lying unconscious, floating in mid-air. The moment before the King of the Netherworld is destroyed, Rex Goodwin tells Yusei that he was successful in reaching him, and tells him to take care of the other Dark Signers, as they will be sent back to Earth. The Goodwin brothers decide to sacrifice themselves, so that the other Dark Signers can be revived. The King of the Netherworld explodes, the Altar of the Dragon Star (Rex Goodwin's dueling platform) is dissolved, and the Geoglyph duel tracks disappear, which causes Jack and Crow to fall. However, the Crimson Dragon catches both of them, and repairs all of the damage done by the King of the Netherworld. Peace returns, and the Daedalus Bridge is finally finished, uniting both Satellite and New Domino City.
