= Yu-Gi-Oh! GX season 4 =

Yu-Gi-Oh! GX
- Season 4
- No. of episodes: 24

Release
- Original network: TV Tokyo
- Original release: October 17, 2007 – March 26, 2008

Season chronology
- ← Previous; Season 3 Next → Yu-Gi-Oh! 5D's; Season 1

Yu-Gi-Oh! Duel Monsters GX (遊☆戯☆王デュエルモンスターズGX, Yū-gi-ō Dyueru Monsutāzu Jī Ekkusu) is the fourth addition to the Yu-Gi-Oh! anime meta-series, as well as the first main spin-off series. The plot revolves around Jaden Yuki and his friends, and tells of their adventures at Duel Academy. The fourth season, the Nightshroud Saga, covers their graduation from the Academy.

This is the only season of Yu-Gi-Oh! GX that has not yet been dubbed in English.

== Episodes ==
No.	Title	Written by	Original release date
157	"A Creeping Threat! The Mysterious Visitor"; Transliteration: "Shinobiyoru Kyōi! Nazo no Raihōsha" (Japanese: 忍びよる脅威!「謎の来訪者」)	Shin Yoshida	October 17, 2007
A month has passed since the Yubel incident. Life at the Academy has started anew, but Jaden has stayed secluded in his room at the Red dorms. In the midst of things, something goes awry with the Duel System. Some cards stop responding to Solid Vision. Fujiwara, a new face everyone believes has been with them for years, examines the computer room and learns the location of the abandoned Obelisk Blue dorm. Meanwhile, Jaden has received a cell phone from an unknown sender and is told some enigmatic information.
158	"Farewell, Duel Academia! Judai's Chosen Path"; Transliteration: "Saraba Dyueru Academia! Judai No Erabu Michi" (Japanese: さらばデュエルアカデミア!十代の選ぶ道)	Shin Yoshida	October 24, 2007
Jaden sees through Fujiwara's ploy, who vanishes in a flash of light leaving behind a feather. While Fujiwara explores the abandoned Obelisk Blue dorm, Jaden submits his Notification of Withdrawal to Chancellor Sheppard. However, Sartorius and Kagemaru come to dissuade him by saying they have sensed a rapidly approaching crisis. However, a mysterious man appears before them.
159	"The Truth Behind Darkness! Judai vs. Fubuki"; Transliteration: "Dākunesu no Shinsō! Judai VS Fubuki" (Japanese: ダークネスの真相!十代VS吹雪)	Shin Yoshida	October 31, 2007
Axel has saved Atticus from Fujiwara; then, Jaden decides to duel Atticus in order to solve the mystery behind Nightshroud. Atticus, borrowing Nightshroud's power, summons Red-Eyes Black Dragon, and then sacrifices Red-Eyes Black Dragon to Special Summon Red-Eyes Darkness Dragon to launch an assault on Jaden. As the duel continues, more about Atticus's dark past is revealed, and there is a lot about Fujiwara and Nightshroud to discover.
160	"Fusing Souls! Neos VS F-G-D"; Transliteration: "Yūgō Suru Tamashī! Neosu VS F·G·D" (Japanese: 融合する魂!ネオスVS F·G·D)	Shin Yoshida	November 7, 2007
Honest is unmasked by Jaden and launches a massive attack, which is countered by Yubel's power within Jaden's soul. Honest agrees to reveal about the worldwide disaster happening at the moment, but is quickly destroyed by the ominous Trueman, who also intends to kill all the others. Jaden adds Honest to his Deck and prepares to face Trueman.
161	"Shall We Duel? Invitation to a Pair Duel"; Transliteration: "Sharu Ui Dyueru? Pea Dyueru e no Shōtai" (Japanese: シャル·ウイ·デュエル?ペアデュエルへの招待)	Koji Ueda	November 14, 2007
Hassleberry and other students plan to hold a Dueling Party as a memory maker. Meanwhile, Alexis has her career path on her mind, about whether to stay at the Academy and become a children's school teacher, or to go study overseas. In the middle of that, at the Duel Party being held, people have formed boy-girl pairs so that they will all duel with graduates against the students. Alexis accidentally gets paired with Jaden by Hassleberry, but they are not cooperating well.
162	"Judai vs. Asuka! Face-Down Card of Hidden Emotions"; Transliteration: "Jūdai VS Asuka Himeta Omoi no Fuse Kādo" (Japanese: 十代VS明日香! 秘めた想いの伏せカード)	Koji Ueda	November 21, 2007
Blair has confirmed that the duel pair of Jaden and Alexis are not both on the same page as one another and slyly places a card face-down. Then, Jaden tells Alexis to check her face-down card, but stages his own duel regardless of what she may expect. Blair has opened her face-down card towards Alexis, who gets angry at the situation. But after a moment of understanding, Alexis overcomes the odds with Jaden's facedown cards, winning the duel and making her decision on her future. Later, she thanks Jaden and nearly confesses her feelings for him.
163	"Challenge from Psycho Shocker"; Transliteration: "Saiko Shokkā Kara no Chōsen-jō" (Japanese: サイコ·ショッカーからの挑戦状)	Yasuyuki Suzuki	November 28, 2007
Out of nowhere, the person who has assaulted Chancellor Sheppard appears. The person is Makoto Inotsume, a wielder of the Psycho-Style, which was created around the same time as its rival, Cyber-Style. His goal has been to defeat the Cyber-Style to make Psycho-Style the main-style school. In order to achieve his objective, he challenges the weakened Zane Truesdale, and they face-off.
164	"The Inherited Cyber Dark Dragon"; Transliteration: "Uketsuga Reshi Saibā Dāku Doragon" (Japanese: 受け継がれしサイバー·ダーク·ドラゴン)	Yasuyuki Suzuki	December 5, 2007
Syrus decides to take the place of his brother and duel Inotsume. However, his practicing using Zane's deck does not go well. He realizes that he will not succeed if he only tries to mimic his brother, and decides to "listen" both his and Zane's decks. Finally, Syrus and Inotsume duel, and a battle between Cyber Dark Dragon and Jinzo ensues.
165	"Aim for it Manjoume! Path to a Pro Duelist!"; Transliteration: "Mezase Manjōme! Puro Dyuerisuto e no Michi!" (Japanese: 目指せ万丈目!プロデュエリストへの道!)	Toyokazu Sakamoto, Shin Yoshida	December 12, 2007
Chazz aims to be a Pro Duelist without his brothers' help, but all he has received are rejection notices. Crowler, who cannot bear to see Chazz as such, brings him to Aster's cruiser, and requests Phoenix to make Chazz his disciple. However, the daily life of a Pro Duelist is beyond Chazz's wildest imagination. Calls for research for articles at seven in the morning, the huge lines at handshaking events, and what shocks him the most, Aster, admired as a genius, goes through tough and bloody dueling training with a coach.
166	"Armed Dragon vs. Dragoon D End"; Transliteration: "Āmudo Doragon Bāsasu Doragūn Dī Endo" (Japanese: アームド·ドラゴンVSドラグーン·D·エンド)	Toyokazu Sakamoto, Shin Yoshida	December 19, 2007
Chazz's mistake causes Aster to retire from the Pro League and completely disappear. Meanwhile, the boy has been discovered by Mike, a TV Director, and tried his hand at the seat of a Star Duelist. Mike's next gimmick is "Teacher-Pupil Clash! Aster vs. Chazz!!". However, there's a certain secret lying behind Aster's Pro League retirement.
167	"Gratitude Duel! Chronos vs. The Original Dropout Boy"; Transliteration: "Ongaeshi Dyueru! Kuronosu Basasu Kanzo Doroppuauto Bōi" (Japanese: 恩返しデュエル!クロノスVS元祖ドロップアウト·ボーイ)	Koji Ueda	December 26, 2007
When Crowler looks at the Graduation Album, he begins to act abnormal. He conducts rigid classes for no reason, suddenly make his students dictate multiplication tables and make them do push-ups... in the end, they end up boycotting the lessons and fleeing. Jaden then challenges Crowler to a duel, the first since the entrance exams.
168	"Opening of Graduation Duel! Neos vs. Black Flame Dragon of Horus"; Transliteration: "Sotsugyō Dyueru Kaishi! Neosu VS Horusu no Kokuen Ryū" (Japanese: 卒業デュエル開始 ! ネオスVSホルスの黒炎竜)	Shin Yoshida	January 4, 2008
The Graduation Duel at the Duel Academy starts and Jaden has been flooded with challenges for the Duel. And so, Sorano, a talented second-grade student from the Blue Dorms, challenges him. Meanwhile, Axel has caught wind of a disaster in Domino City, because Trueman has risen from the shadows and is ready to put his scheme in motion.
169	"Price of Decision! O'Brien Flame of Darkness"; Transliteration: "Ketsudan no Daishō! Oburaien no Yami" (Japanese: 決断の代償 ! オブライエン炎の闇)	Yasuyuki Suzuki	January 9, 2008
Axel has battled against Trueman, who taunted him with painful memories and thoughts. Trueman defeats Axel, and all memories of the boy are erased, as if he never existed. Jaden arrives Domino City to investigate, and finds himself face to face with an army of evil Axels.
170	"Saiou, Again! Activate "Decisive Power of Absolute Destiny"!!"; Transliteration: "Saiō Futatabi! "Zettai unmei Kettei-ryoku" Hatsudō!!" (Japanese: 斎王再び!「絶対運命決定力」発動!!)	Koji Ueda	January 16, 2008
Sartorius saves Jaden from Trueman and tells him important news: the dark emissary is going to attack the Duel Academy. However, Sartorius suddenly corners the boy and challenges him to a duel, rendering him unable to summon monsters with his combo of Arcana Force 0 - The Fool and Tour of Doom.
171	"End of Destiny! Magma Neos vs. Dark Ruler"; Transliteration: "Unmei no Shūen! Maguma Neosu VS Za Dāku Rūrā" (Japanese: 運命の終焉!マグマ·ネオスVSザ·ダーク·ルーラー)	Koji Ueda	January 23, 2008
Jaden gets stuck in a predicament as his deck steadily decreases through Sowing of the Fool. He listens to Winged Kuriboh there and manages to retaliate to The Dark Ruler. Jaden hears Sarina, as he gets backed into the corner with 13 cards left, and she urges him to save her brother. Jaden realizes that he must defeat Sartorius in order to understand and rescue him.
172	"Duel Academia Crisis! The Gem Beasts Blocking the Way"; Transliteration: "Dyueru Akademia no Kiki! Tachiha Dakaru Hōgyokujū" (Japanese: デュエルアカデミアの危機! 立ちはだかる宝玉獣)	Toyokazu Sakamoto	January 30, 2008
Jaden has finished his match with Sartorius and headed towards the Academy, but this time, Trueman blocks his path, which leads to a duel. Trueman started the battle using a Crystal Beast deck, one that only Jesse should possess. Jaden gets shocked, realizing that Jesse has fallen into Trueman's clutches.
173	"Invasion of Darkness! The Stolen Memories"; Transliteration: "Dākunesu no Shinkō! Ubawareta Kioku" (Japanese: ダークネスの侵攻! 奪われた記憶)	Masahiro Hikokubo	February 6, 2008
Trueman has possessed Sorano's body and has been assaulting students in the academy one by one. The students he defeats get dragged into Nothingness and memories of them get wiped clean from the populace. Chazz and the others also fall to Trueman, and Atticus, having forgot about them, meanders around the barren academy by himself. Jaden and Jesse manage to reach him, and then the real mastermind behind Trueman finally shows up...
174	"Activate, Clear World! Ferocious Negative Effect"; Transliteration: "Hatsudō! (Kuriā Wārudo) Kyōfu no Negatibu Efekuto" (Japanese: 発動!「クリアー·ワールド」恐怖のネガティブエフェクト)	Masahiro Hikokubo	February 13, 2008
Fujiwara speaks of the wonders of the World of Darkness, but Atticus does not share the same sentiments. Fujiwara has activated the Field Magic, Clear World, and inflicted the Negative Effect on Atticus, who is backed into a predicament. Fujiwara shows him the darkness in the hearts of Chazz, Alexis, Syrus, and the others, in order to land the final blow against him.
175	"Battle Royale! Judai vs. Johan vs. Fujiwara"; Transliteration: "Batoru Rowaiaru! Jūdai VS Yohan VS Fujiwara" (Japanese: バトルロワイヤル!十代VSヨハンVS藤原)	Yasuyuki Suzuki	February 20, 2008
Jaden and Jesse form a tag team and start their duel against Fujiwara, who deploys Clear World and activates Negative Effect, launching a powerful attack against Jaden using a combo of his monsters. However, Jaden avoids disaster with Jesse backing him up. A furious Fujiwara, grasping the fact that he cannot win unless he severs Jaden and Jesse's bonds, has peeped into Jesse's mind in search of the darkness in his heart.
176	"Rainbow Neos, Protector of Bonds vs. Clear Vicious Knight"; Transliteration: "Kizuna o Mamori Shimo no Reinbō Neosu VS Kuriā Vishasu Naito" (Japanese: 絆を守りしものレインボー･ネオスVSクリアー·ヴィシャス·ナイト)	Yasuyuki Suzuki	February 27, 2008
Fujiwara attempts to use the darkness in Jesse's heart to destroy the strong bonds between Jaden and Jesse, but to no avail. Fujiwara, their bond infuriating him, has activated Attribute Gravity and Attribute Chameleon. The two effects that Fujiwara has put into motion have caused both Jesse and Jaden's monsters to attack one another, and Jesse does not resist the strike. However, Honest appears before Fujiwara and reminds him of sad memories.
177	"Combo of Terror! "Zero and Infinity""; Transliteration: "Kyōfu no Konbo! "Kyomu to Mugen"" (Japanese: 恐怖のコンボ!「虚無と無限」)	Shin Yoshida	March 5, 2008
Jaden succeeds in separating Nightshroud from Fujiwara, but the world is still wrapped in the darkness of a total solar eclipse. Out from the midst of that darkness finally comes the true Nightshroud, who informs Jaden that the World of Darkness was created through the darkness in the hearts of all duelists. Jaden challenges Nightshroud in order to save everyone from his World. Nightshroud activates the combo of terror, Zero and Infinity, and ironically, the only help Jaden has comes from Yubel.
178	"Final Hope! Judai Yuki"; Transliteration: "Saigo no Kibō! Yūki Jūdai" (Japanese: 最後の希望!遊城十代)	Shin Yoshida	March 12, 2008
Jaden fuses together Neos and Yubel, summoning Neos Wiseman, and attacks Nightshroud. However, Nightshroud has a relaxed smile about his face. He revives his Darkness Eye and activates his Zero and Infinity combo. In the midst of his seesaw offense and defense unfolding, Nightshroud reveals the shocking truth: Nightshroud himself is the embodiment of mankind's future. Jaden battles with the fate of all life on his success, encouraging everyone not to fear the future and focus on the light in their souls and their cards, and invoking E-Hero Divine Neos for a final clash.
179	"Good-Bye Judai! A Tearful Graduation Ceremony"; Transliteration: "Sayonara Jūdai! Namida no Sotsugyō Shiki" (Japanese: さよなら十代!涙の卒業式)	Shin Yoshida	March 19, 2008
Jaden and his friends have safely made it to their graduation ceremonies. That evening, a thank-you party is held, but Jaden is nowhere to be found there. In his dorm, he plans to pack up and venture out on his adventure ahead, When winged Kuriboh has appears in front of him and led him to the exhibition gallery. There, Yugi Muto was waiting, and tells him that it's time to begin the real graduation duel. Yugi informs a doubtful Jaden that Jaden has gained a lot of power over the past three years, but has lost something special, and that he must retrieve it. Once he holds his card over the deck, a timeslip to the world of the past comes from out of nowhere. Waiting there is Yugi from the past, which, by dueling him, will allow that special thing to be retrieved. The duel begins, and when the Duel starts heating up, Yami Yugi takes over the Duel, sensing that Jaden is a powerful opponent.
180	"The True Graduation Duel! Judai vs. Legendary Duelist"; Transliteration: "Shin no Sotsugyō Dyueru! Jūdai VS Densetsu no Dyuerisuto" (Japanese: 真の卒業デュエル!十代VS伝説のデュエリスト)	Shin Yoshida	March 26, 2008
Yami Yugi manages to summon one of the Egyptian Gods, but the end of the Duel is never shown. After the Duel, Jaden finds out that the thing he lost which was a passion for dueling. The show concludes with Jaden, Banner's spirit, and Pharaoh running into the distance, awaiting their next adventure.
