= Yu-Gi-Oh! GX season 3 =

Yu-Gi-Oh! GX: Quest for the Rainbow Dragon Yu-Gi-Oh! GX: Into the Shadows
- Season 3
- No. of episodes: 52 (51 Dubbed)

Release
- Original network: TV Tokyo
- Original release: October 4, 2006 – October 10, 2007

Season chronology
- ← Previous; Season 2 Next → Season 4

Yu-Gi-Oh! Duel Monsters GX (遊☆戯☆王デュエルモンスターズGX, Yū-gi-ō Dyueru Monsutāzu Jī Ekkusu) is the fourth addition to the Yu-Gi-Oh! anime meta-series, as well as the 1st main spin-off series. The plot centers around Jaden Yuki and his friends, and tells of their adventures at the Duel Academy, a school that teaches students how to play the card game Duel Monsters. Season three, the Dimension World Saga, covers their third year at the Academy and the series' darker turn. This season was broadcast by 4Kids Entertainment as Yu-Gi-Oh! GX. The final episode of the season, as well as the next season, were not dubbed.

== Summary ==
Jaden's limits are being tested by Professor Thelonius Viper because he was invited by Sheppard so he could improve the students' dueling. Many new faces from other Academies around the world show themselves, including Jesse Andersen, who, like Jaden, has the ability to speak to his Duel Monsters cards. Evil forces return to threaten not just Earth, but other dimensions as well, including the duel spirits' world. Jaden and his friends rise to fight this evil once again, but this time, the fight is more personal for Jaden. The "Supreme King" threatening the entire universe is actually a past incarnation of his, the dark side of his soul. Jaden soon finds himself facing the deranged duel spirit Yubel in a battle that will decide the fate of several universes, and takes the only path to defeat her, by absorbing her power into himself.

== Episode list ==
No. overall	No. in season	English dub title / Japanese translated title	Written by	Original release date	American air date
105	1	"Third Time's a Charm" / "Start of the New School Year! The Preminition of Tribulation"; Transliteration: "Shin Gakki Sutāto! Haran no Yokan" (Japanese: 新学期スタート!波乱の予感)	Junki Takegami	October 4, 2006	April 7, 2007
Jaden reflects on what happened to him last year and how his life changed because of that experience. Chazz decides that rather than help repaint the Obelisk Dorm back to blue, to move back in to the Slifer Red dorm only to find that Blair Flannigan has moved in as Slifers newest freshman. Chancellor Sheppard worries that despite his skill, Jaden is entering his third year still in the Slifer Red Dorm, and decides to call in a hard-hitting professor who can push Jaden to success.
106	2	"Jewel of a Duel (Part 1 of 2)" / "Judai and Johan of the Gem Beast Deck"; Transliteration: "Jūdai to Hōgyokujū Dekki no Yohan" (Japanese: 十代と宝玉獣デッキのヨハン)	Shin Yoshida	October 11, 2006	April 14, 2007
Four Transfer students, and Professor Thelonius Viper, arrive at Duel Academy. Jaden befriends a new student who can also see Duel Spirits. Then when the new students are revealed, one of them, Jesse Anderson, is missing. Then Jaden's new friend shows up last, claiming he got lost on the way to the ceremony, and reveals he is Jesse, who is in possession of a rare deck of "Crystal Beasts". Professor Viper makes Jaden and Jesse duel in an exhibition match.
107	3	"Jewel of a Duel (Part 2 of 2)" / "The Neo-Spacians vs. The Gem Beasts"; Transliteration: "Neo Supēshian Vāsasu Hōgyokujū" (Japanese: ネオ·スペーシアンVS宝玉獣)	Shin Yoshida	October 18, 2006	April 21, 2007
Jaden and Jesse duel, Jesse using his crystal beast monsters and Jaden using Neospacians. There he learns about the Rainbow Dragon. However, after fooling everyone into believing he has it, Jesse admits Pegasus is still searching for the tablet that can be used to make it. After the match the two head up to the rooftop where they discuss their decks, while Chazz, Aster, Syrus and Hassleberry agree the two are like twins.
108	4	"Hanging with Axel (Part 1 of 2)" / "Professor Cobra's Assassin"; Transliteration: "Purofessā Kobura no Shikaku" (Japanese: プロフェッサー·コブラの刺客)	Junki Takegami	November 1, 2006	May 5, 2007
Under the orders of Viper, Axel Brodie kidnaps Syrus in order to challenge Jaden. Back at the dorm Jesse is bugging a frustrated Hassleberry into seeing his deck when Jaden falls right into Axel's trap and runs off to rescue Syrus. If he loses, Syrus will fall off of the cliff.
109	5	"Hanging with Axel (Part 2 of 2)" / "Judai and The Fiery O'Brien"; Transliteration: "Jūdai to Honō no Oburaien" (Japanese: 十代と炎のオブライエン)	Junki Takegami	November 8, 2006	May 12, 2007
Jaden continues to duel Axel while Jesse, with assistance from Hassleberry, tries to rescue Syrus. During the duel, Axel begins to rethink his loyalty to Viper. Axel decides to play fair and releases Syrus so he can focus on the match. In the end, Jaden wins, but at a heavy price. He ends up going unconscious and Axel is out of energy but can still stand and is going to figure out what Viper is up to.
110	6	"Primal Instinct" / "Tyranno Kenzan and Jim of the Fossil Dragon"; Transliteration: "Tirano Kenzan to Kasekiryū no Jimu" (Japanese: ティラノ剣山と化石竜のジム)	Junki Takegami	November 15, 2006	May 26, 2007
With their new friend Jim Cook by their side, Jaden and the gang investigate a strange wave signal. Hassleberry goes dino because of the dinosaur blood he has and he duels Jim. But in the end, they both end up out of energy and in the hospital.
111	7	"Head in the Clouds (Part 1 of 2)" / "Manjoume and Amon of the Cloud Deck"; Transliteration: "Manjōme to Kumo Dekki no Amon" (Japanese: 万丈目と雲デッキのアモン)	Junki Takegami, Yasuyuki Suzuki	November 22, 2006	June 16, 2007
Chazz is jealous of Adrian and he decides to challenge him. In order to not get expelled and so he doesn't lose energy, Adrian organizes a party for dueling so that he will be safe to duel. Chazz duels against Adrian Gecko, the heir to the Gecko financial group. He (Chazz) takes them up in a helicopter to duel in the sky, which turns out to be a bad idea, since Adrian duels using a Cloudian Monster deck.
112	8	"Head in the Clouds (Part 2 of 2)" / "Thunder vs. Eye of the Typhoon"; Transliteration: "Sandā Vāsasu Ai Obu Za Taifūn" (Japanese: サンダーVSアイ·オブ·ザ·タイフーン)	Junki Takegami	November 29, 2006	June 23, 2007
Adrian's Cloudian Monsters prove to be too much for Chazz to handle. He loses the match and they both pass out, and so does most of Duel Academy. Meanwhile, Axel tries to find out what Viper is up to.
113	9	"Win Mr. Stein's Duel (Part 1 of 2)" / "Judai vs. The Treacherous Elemental Hero"; Transliteration: "Jūdai Vāsasu Uragiri no Erementaru Hīrō" (Japanese: 十代VS裏切りのEヒーロー)	Shin Yoshida	December 6, 2006	July 14, 2007
With most of the school, including Blair, in the infirmary, Jaden and his friends go and find Viper. While investigating Viper's complex, the gang ends up getting separated. Jaden duels against Professor Stein and his Scab Scar-Knight, which turns his Monsters against him.
114	10	"Win Mr. Stein's Duel (Part 2 of 2)" / "A Desperate Struggle! The Scarred Heroes"; Transliteration: "Zettai Zetsumei! Kizudarake no Hīrō" (Japanese: 絶体絶命!傷だらけのヒーロー)	Shin Yoshida	December 13, 2006	July 21, 2007
Jaden struggles against an unlikely enemy: his own Monsters! He's also in a tough situation, as Alexis drowns when Stein loses life points. However, Jim rescues Alexis, allowing Jaden to focus on reducing Stein's life points without worrying about Alexis. Jaden ends up winning, by a small margin, but Stein falls down into the pit and Jaden goes unconscious again.
115	11	"Trapper Keeper (Part 1 of 2)" / "Giese the Spirit Hunter"; Transliteration: "Seirei Gari no Gīsu" (Japanese: 精霊狩りのギース)	Masahiro Hikokubo	December 20, 2006	July 28, 2007
While investigating the complex, Jesse and Syrus find Jaden unconscious. While Syrus goes for help Jesse stays behind with Jaden who finally awakes. They come across Trapper, a cruel man who hunts cards with spirits, who aims to steal the Crystal Beasts. Jesse reveals to Jaden that he has been hunting Trapper for several years after he came across a kid whose card was stolen by Trapper and made a promise to return it. Trapper takes Sapphire Pegasus and uses it as bait to get the rest of the Crystal Beasts. Trapper and Jesse begin dueling with the stakes high: If Jesse wins, Trapper will return Sapphire Pegasus' spirit. If Trapper wins, he gets all the Crystal Beast cards. Jesse agrees; however, almost immediately Trapper catches Amethyst Cat and Amber Mammoth.
116	12	"Trapper Keeper (Part 2 of 2)" / "The Gem Beasts vs. Hell Gundog"; Transliteration: "Hōgyokujū Vāsasu Heru Gan Doggu" (Japanese: 宝玉獣VS地獄の番犬)	Masahiro Hikokubo	December 27, 2006	August 4, 2007
Trapper continues to imprison Jesse's Crystal Beasts, until Jaden comes to the rescue. Trapper threatened to rip the kid whose card Jesse had promised to win back in half if Jesse attacked him (Trapper). However, if Jesse didn't attack him, Trapper would drain Sapphire Pegasus of all its power and use it to power up his deck again. Trapper finally decides to rip the card in half, but right before he makes the first rip, Jaden swings down and knocks the card from Trappers hands and into his, saving the card. Jesse then draws the Sapphire Pegasus card, which frees the card's spirit; he then performs a complicated combo which defeats Trapper. Trapper had also been wearing a bioband and disappears, supposedly attacked by the cards he had stolen, and his power is sent to Viper. Jesse becomes weaker as well; however, unlike Jaden, he (Jesse) does not pass out.
117	13	"A Snake in the Grass (Part 1 of 3)" / "Decisive Battle! Judai vs. Professor Cobra"; Transliteration: "Kessen! Jūdai Vāsasu Purofessā Kobura" (Japanese: 決戦!十代VSプロフェッサー·コブラ)	Shin Yoshida	January 3, 2007	September 1, 2007
With help from Axel, Jaden and the gang reach the heart of Viper's complex. Jaden's enthusiastic to duel, though Viper's Venom Deck swiftly overwhelms him.
118	14	"A Snake in the Grass (Part 2 of 3)" / "The Terror! Vennominon the King of Poisonous Snakes"; Transliteration: "Kyōfu! Dokujaō Venominon" (Japanese: 恐怖!毒蛇王ヴェノミノン)	Shin Yoshida	January 10, 2007	September 8, 2007
Viper Summons Vennominon the King of Poisonous Snakes and destroys Jaden's monsters while revealing his own tragic past of his son's death. Though Jaden's Marine Neos defeats Vennominon in battle, Viper revives his king and restores all his power to weaken and destroy Jaden's monster.
119	15	"A Snake in the Grass (Part 3 of 3)" / "Triple Contact Fusion! Magma Neos"; Transliteration: "Toripuru Kontakuto Yūgō! Maguma Neosu" (Japanese: トリプルコンタクト融合!マグマ·ネオス)	Shin Yoshida	January 17, 2007	September 15, 2007
Jaden Destroys Vennominon once more with the help of Wildedge and forces Viper to resort to his ace monster Vennominaga the Deity of Poisonous Snakes. Viper's Powerful monster forces Jaden to win in 3 moves or lose the duel. Eventually, Jaden's Magma Neos wins him the duel, though the entity Viper was helping transports duel academy to a different dimension upon revival.
120	16	"Inter-Dimension Detention" / "A Battle in a Different World! The Gem Beasts vs. Harpie Lady"; Transliteration: "Isekai no Tatakai! Hōgyokujū Vāsasu Hāpyi Redi" (Japanese: 異世界での戦い!宝玉獣VSハーピイレディ)	Junki Takegami	January 24, 2007	September 22, 2007
With Jaden's narrow defeat of Viper, our heroes (Jaden, Syrus, Hassleberry, Alexis, Jesse, Jim [plus Shirley] and an unconscious Axel) arrived in a strange world. Chazz, Crowler, Bonaparte, Blair, and Marcel, along with the Gecko Financial Group submarine have been brought to this strange place too. They look for students and find that around 100 students of all dorms (Obelisk Blues, Ra Yellows, and Slifer Reds) were also transported, including Adrian (who they think is on their side). Adrian brought the weird hand that Viper was collecting power for. After fighting to protect a stranger (who turns out to be Bastion), Jesse learns the hard way that the Bio Bands are still draining energy, after a group of Harpie Ladies attacked Sapphire Pegasus. Bastion explains that as he studied with Professor Eisenstien, the two found that there are 12 dimensions, and in one of the dimensions, spirits are real. Bastion then was transported to that dimension somehow. Students start panicking when they learn that the cook, Dorothy, who was also transported, thinks she only has enough food and water to last a week. Jaden, Syrus, Hassleberry, Alexis, Jesse, and Jim/Shirley come to realize that this isn't a game anymore.
121	17	"Sub-Desert Duel" / "Desert Survival! Johan vs. Doodlebug"; Transliteration: "Sabaku no Sabaibaru! Yohan Vāsasu Arijigoku" (Japanese: 砂漠のサバイバル!ヨハンVS蟻地獄)	Junki Takegami	January 31, 2007	September 29, 2007
When Blair becomes ill, Jaden, Jesse, Axel, Jim/Shirley, and Adrian (under the order of Marcel to watch Jaden, though the others think he is helping them) search for medicine at a submarine spotted by Bastion, but their search is blocked by The Rock Spirit. Even though they escape and reach the sub they are sealed inside.
122	18	"The Night of the Living Duelists" / "The Duel Academia in Crisis! The Terror of the Zombie Students!"; Transliteration: "Dyueru Akademia Kiki! Zonbi Seito no Kyōfu!" (Japanese: デュエルアカデミア危機!ゾンビ生徒の恐怖!)	Koji Ueda	February 7, 2007	October 6, 2007
At the Academy, a revelation about the Bio Bands is revealed. As the students lose their energy, they become zombie-like Duel Ghouls, including Chazz and Syrus.
123	19	"School Ghoul Duels" / "The Rei Rescue Operation! Elemental Heroes vs. Fallen Angel Nurse"; Transliteration: "Rei Kyūshutsu Sakusen! Erementaru Hīrō Vāsasu Datenshi Nāsu" (Japanese: レイ救出作戦!E·ヒーローVS堕天使ナース)	Koji Ueda	February 14, 2007	October 13, 2007
Jaden and Jesse return with the medicine for Blair, but Jaden has to fight his way through an army of Duel Ghouls while Jesse escapes with Blair.
124	20	"Triple Play (Part 1 of 2)" / "Disruption in the Academy! A Duel, Hungry"; Transliteration: "Gakuen Bunretsu! Harapeko Dyueru" (Japanese: 学園分裂!腹ペコデュエル)	Yasuyuki Suzuki	February 21, 2007	October 20, 2007
As the remaining students start to run out of food, the possessed Marcel offers a challenge. If Jaden could win in a duel, then they could have access to the food.
125	21	"Triple Play (Part 2 of 2)" / "Johan, Jim, and O'Brien vs. The Three Masked Knights"; Transliteration: "Yohan Jimu Oburaien Vāsasu Kamen no Sankishi" (Japanese: ヨハン·ジム·オブライエンVS仮面の三騎士)	Yasuyuki Suzuki	February 28, 2007	November 3, 2007
Jesse, Axel, and Jim face off with three Duel Ghouls, who were merged with monster spirits.
126	22	"Return of the Sacred Beasts" / "Judai vs. Manjome - Dark Sword the Dragon Knight"; Transliteration: "Jūdai Vāsasu Manjōme Ryūkishi Dāku Sōdo" (Japanese: 十代VS万丈目·竜騎士ダークソード)	Yasuyuki Suzuki	March 7, 2007	November 10, 2007
As Jaden races to keep Marcel from releasing the Sacred Beasts, he reluctantly duels against Chazz.
127	23	"Breaking of the Sacred Seal" / "The one who Releases the Seal - Martin"; Transliteration: "Fūin wo Yabureshimono Marutan" (Japanese: 封印を破りし者·マルタン)	Yasuyuki Suzuki	March 14, 2007	January 19, 2008
Adrian challenges Marcel to a duel, and learns about the power of Exodia.
128	24	"A Dimensional Duel" / "The Gem Beasts vs. Cyber End Dragon"; Transliteration: "Hōgyokujū Vāsasu Saibā Endo Doragon" (Japanese: 宝玉獣VSサイバー·エンド·ドラゴン)	Shin Yoshida	March 21, 2007	January 26, 2008
The Rainbow Dragon has been found, but a duel must keep the portal open long enough for it to be sent to the other world. Jesse duels against Zane to meet this goal. The duel is cut short by the arrival of many Duel Ghouls, but the card is still sent through the portal. Jesse, who is already tired from dueling Zane, suggests he duels to make their way out, but then Jaden arrives to take everyone to safety. Marcel then puts in another challenge for Jaden.
129	25	"Unleash the Dragon (Part 1 of 2)" / "Threat of the Three Phantom Demons! Judai vs. Martin"; Transliteration: "Sangenma no Kyōi! Jūdai Vāsasu Marutan" (Japanese: 三幻魔の脅威!十代VSマルタン)	Shin Yoshida	March 28, 2007	February 2, 2008
While Jesse and Axel retrieve the Rainbow Dragon, Jaden duels Marcel, in order to end the madness he's caused.
130	26	"Unleash the Dragon (Part 2 of 2)" / "The Awakening Of The Rainbow Dragon"; Transliteration: "Reinbō Doragon Kakusei" (Japanese: レインボードラゴン覚醒)	Shin Yoshida	April 4, 2007	February 9, 2008
Jesse joins the duel and summons Rainbow Dragon to help Jaden face the Sacred Beasts. At the end, Jaden learns that Marcel was only a puppet of a ghost from Jaden's past: A monster spirit named Yubel. Jaden reveals very little about Yubel to Jesse, but then Yubel reveals her ultimate monster. Jesse says he has to stay to keep the energy going so that the school can get back to their world but the crumbling stadium forces Axel, Blair, Marcel and Jaden to escape, with Jaden and Marcel unconscious. Yubel and Jesse then vanish.
131	27	"All For One" / "Great Gathering of Ace Cards! Open, Door of Different Dimension!"; Transliteration: "Ēsu Kādo Daishūgō!! Hirake, Jigen no Tobira!" (Japanese: エースカード大集合!!開け, 次元の扉!)	Junki Takegami	April 11, 2007	February 16, 2008
When Rainbow Dragon sends the Academy back, Jaden finds out that Jesse didn't come back. He says it's his fault and decides to rescue him. Shepard tells Jaden's friends about Yubel who Axel heard about briefly during the duel. When a portal opens to another dimension, Jaden is going to go through it alone in order to find Jesse, but his friends back him up and end up sending him, Syrus, Bastion, Jim, Axel, Alexis, Atticus, Chazz, Zane, Aster, Crowler, Hassleberry and Echo into it.
132	28	"A New World Order" / "Duel That Bets Life-or-Death"; Transliteration: "Seishi wo Kaketa Dyueru" (Japanese: 生死を賭けた決闘(デュエル))	Koji Ueda	April 18, 2007	February 23, 2008
Reuniting with Tania in the other world, Jaden and Bastion help her rescue enslaved monsters. There, they learn that when dueling in this world, if you lose, you die. No one knows exactly where that is though.
133	29	"Friend or Fiend" / "Judai vs. Scarr, Scout of Dark World"; Transliteration: "Jūdai Vāsasu Ankokukai no Sekkō Sukā" (Japanese: 十代VS暗黒界の斥候スカー)	Yasuyuki Suzuki	April 25, 2007	March 1, 2008
Upon arriving in a desolate village, the gang learns about this world, and its brutal masters: The fiends of Dark World.
134	30	"Dueling With The Dark Army" / "Judai vs. Zure, Knight of Dark World"; Transliteration: "Jūdai Vāsasu Ankokukai no Kishi Zūru" (Japanese: 十代VS暗黒界の騎士ズール)	Yasuyuki Suzuki	May 2, 2007	March 8, 2008
Jaden heads to a slave camp where there are rumors that Jesse has been spotted, and ends up dueling the Dark World fiend named Zure.
135	31	"Turning The Page (Part 1 of 2)" / "Judai vs. Brron, Mad King of Dark World"; Transliteration: "Jūdai Vāsasu Ankokukai no Kyō'ō Buron" (Japanese: 十代VS暗黒界の狂王ブロン)	Junki Takegami	May 9, 2007	March 15, 2008
Jaden challenges Brron, Mad King of Dark World, in order to end his reign of terror, but he learns that his friends are being used as live sacrifices to awaken an ancient card. As a result of Jaden causing damage to Brron, Chazz then vanishes as the first sacrifice.
136	32	"Turning The Page (Part 2 of 2)" / "Activate Wicked Scriptures! Reign, Overlord of Dark World"; Transliteration: "Jashin Kyōten Hatsudō! Ankokukai no Mashin Rein" (Japanese: 邪心経典発動!暗黒界の魔神レイン)	Junki Takegami	May 16, 2007	March 22, 2008
As Hassleberry, Alexis, and Atticus disappear before his eyes, Jaden decides to take his revenge on Brron causing shades of his dark side to emerge for the first time. Ultimately, Jaden brutally defeats the mad tyrant, though the Supreme King takes over as a cost of Jaden having to lose the respect of Syrus, Jim and Axel.
137	33	"The State of Syrus" / "Sho's Determination! 'The Proof of Friendship'"; Transliteration: "Shō no Ketsui! Yūjō no Akashi" (Japanese: 翔の決意!「友情の証」)	Koji Ueda	May 23, 2007	March 29, 2008
Filled with doubt about Jaden, Syrus wanders alone across the other world. Syrus also meets his brother Zane and they have a heart to heart talk about Syrus's friendship with Jaden. Zane leaves but refuses to tell Aster why.
138	34	"The Darkness Is Revealed" / "Supreme King Descends - The Death Duelists"; Transliteration: "Haō Kōrin Shi no Dyueristo-tachi" (Japanese: 覇王降臨·死の決闘者たち)	Masahiro Hikokubo	May 30, 2007	April 5, 2008
Jim and Axel come across a village under siege by the army of the Supreme King. After seeing the destruction caused by the Dark Army, Jim challenges the king, but becomes shocked when he learns who he really is. Jaden is the Supreme King.
139	35	"A Sight Unseen (Part 1 of 2)" / "Dark Fusion! Inferno Wing!!"; Transliteration: "Dāku Fyūjon! Inferuno Wingu!!" (Japanese: ダーク·フュージョン!インフェルノ·ウイング!!)	Junki Takegami, Masahiro Hikokubo	June 6, 2007	April 12, 2008
After learning that Jaden is the Supreme King, Jim decides to use his Eye of Oricalcum to try to free him. He duels Jaden as the Supreme King and during the duel uses the Eye to see inside of Jaden. He sees that a battle is still going on inside Jaden between the good and evil half of him. He tries to reach out to him but he can't get through the barrier of Jaden's depression, the Supreme King nor Professor Viper's words.
140	36	"A Sight Unseen (Part 2 of 2)" / "First and Last, Super Fusion Activates!"; Transliteration: "Kūzenzetsugo Chō Yūgō Hatsudō!" (Japanese: 空前絶後·超融合発動!)	Masahiro Hikokubo	June 13, 2007	April 19, 2008
Jim does his best to defeat the Supreme King Jaden but Super Polymerization leads to his defeat. Shortly before death, Jim sees how strong Professor Viper's words are on Jaden. Jim hopes to support Axel to avenge him but Axel ends up scared by the Supreme King and runs away, afraid to face him.
141	37	"What Lies Beneath (Part 1 of 3)" / "Supreme King of Terror! The Wandering O'Brien"; Transliteration: "Kyōfu no Haō! Samayoeru Oburaien" (Japanese: 恐怖の覇王!彷徨えるオブライエン)	Shin Yoshida	June 20, 2007	April 26, 2008
Axel's courage begins to wane after watching Jim disappear but with help from Zane and Aster, he resolves to finish what Jim started and goes to defeat the Supreme King.
142	38	"What Lies Beneath (Part 2 of 3)" / "The Victor is Righteous! Supreme King vs. O'Brien"; Transliteration: "Kachinokoru mono ga Seigi! Haō Vāsasu Oburaien" (Japanese: 勝ち残る者が正義!覇王VSオブライエン)	Shin Yoshida	June 27, 2007	May 3, 2008
After defeating Skull Knight, Axel leads the rebellion against the Supreme King. He goes with Zane and Aster to defeat the Supreme King and get Jaden back.
143	39	"What Lies Beneath (Part 3 of 3)" / "Volcanic Devil vs. The Most Heinous Evil Hero"; Transliteration: "Vorukanikku Debiru Vāsasu Saikyō no Ībiru Hīrō" (Japanese: ヴォルカニック･デビルVS最凶のイービル·ヒーロー)	Shin Yoshida	July 4, 2007	May 10, 2008
Using the Eye of Orichalcum, Axel sacrifices himself, hoping to destroy the Supreme King and free Jaden while Zane and Aster deal with most of the Supreme King's main minions. Ojama recalls seeing Jesse as a shadow following him and Syrus but feels there wasn't something right about him.
144	40	"The Forbidden Ritual (Part 1 of 2)" / "Activate! The Ultimate Unsealing Ritualistic Technique"; Transliteration: "Hatsudō! Kyūkyoku Fūinkaihō Gishikijutsu" (Japanese: 発動!究極封印解放儀式術)	Yasuyuki Suzuki	July 11, 2007	May 17, 2008
As Jaden regains his senses he realizes what he has done, blames himself and gets a fever showing part of the Supreme King isn't gone. The group is then teleported and confronted by Adrian, who came to the other world to find Exodia and become ruler of that dimension. But in order to summon Exodia, he has to sacrifice duel energy and uses Echo to do it.
145	41	"The Forbidden Ritual (Part 2 of 2)" / "Summon Exodius the Ultimate Forbidden God!"; Transliteration: "Shōkan Kyūkyoku Fūinshin Ekuzodiosu" (Japanese: 究極封印神エクゾディオス召喚!)	Yasuyuki Suzuki	July 18, 2007	May 24, 2008
Adrian reveals that in order for him to claim Exodia, he must sacrifice his closest friend, Echo. Aster tries to stop him but fails. He tells the rest of them to get out and save themselves. He ends up dying and Adrian goes away riding on Exodia's shoulder, going to become ruler of that land.
146	42	"Conquering the Past (Part 1 of 3)" / "The Sealed Fusion"; Transliteration: "Fūinsareta Yūgō" (Japanese: 封印された融合)	Junki Takegami	July 25, 2007	May 31, 2008
Jaden begins to fear his Polymerization card cause of all the harm it caused when he was the Supreme King. Zane duels him to make Jaden see he isn't ready to go anywhere to try to find Jesse. But Zane's heart starts to fail and they must stop the duel.
147	43	"Conquering the Past (Part 2 of 3)" / "Showdown of Fate! Cyber-Style vs. The Gem Beasts"; Transliteration: "Innen no Taiketsu! Saibā-ryū Vāsasu Hōgyokujū" (Japanese: 因縁の対決!サイバー流VS宝玉獣)	Junki Takegami	August 8, 2007	June 7, 2008
Jaden learns that the Supreme King is still a part of him. Meanwhile, Jesse is found at last, but he's under Yubel's control. He and Zane duel, Zane saying that he would rather die dueling than wait for his heart to fail him by lying down and doing nothing.
148	44	"Conquering the Past (Part 3 of 3)" / "Ultimate Dragon Showdown! Cyber End vs. Rainbow Dark"; Transliteration: "Kyūkyoku Doragon Taiketsu! Saibā Endo VS Reinbō Dāku" (Japanese: 究極ドラゴン対決!サイバー･エンドVSレインボー·ダーク)	Junki Takegami	August 15, 2007	June 14, 2008
In what seems to be his final duel, Zane duels against Yubel and Rainbow Dark Dragon and will not lose without a fight. But even with Zane trying his best, he loses to her and dies of heart failure but the duel takes its toll on her as well. Syrus and Jaden cry over their dead friend and brother.
149	45	"The Ultimate Face-Off (Part 1 of 2)" / "Demon God Showdown! The Phantom Demons vs. Exodia!"; Transliteration: "Majin Taiketsu! Genma VS Ekuzodia" (Japanese: 魔神対決!幻魔VSエクゾディア)	Yasuyuki Suzuki	August 22, 2007	July 26, 2008
After witnessing Zane's defeat, Jaden, Syrus and Crowler enter the gate in order to confront Yubel and free Jesse from its control. Meanwhile, Yubel, recovering from her duel with Zane, recuperates in her stronghold, only to find Adrian on its throne and is furious. The two then duel for dominance over the alternate dimension. Adrian Near wins with Exodius but Yubel has more up her sleeve than meets the eye.
150	46	"The Ultimate Face-Off (Part 2 of 2)" / "Summon 'Yubel'!"; Transliteration: ""Yuberu" Shōkan!" (Japanese: "ユベル"召喚!)	Yasuyuki Suzuki	August 29, 2007	August 2, 2008
Adrian's duel against Yubel continues. After Yubel utterly annihilates his Exodius strategy, Adrian starts his backup strategy of Fog Castle and Fog King, planning to once again gather the five Exodia pieces into his hand but Yubel defeats him in the end and Adrian dies.
151	47	"The Power Within (Part 1 of 2)" / "Neos vs. The Advanced Gem Beasts"; Transliteration: "Neosu VS Adobansudo Hōgyokujū" (Japanese: ネオスVSアドバンスド宝玉獣)	Koji Ueda	September 5, 2007	August 9, 2008
With Adrian dead and Yubel back on her throne, Jaden duels Jesse, who is still controlled by Yubel. Jaden tries to save Jesse by going into his mind to find him under the instructions of Neos, but realizes that Yubel has sealed Jesse's spirit into something besides his own body. He then realizes that he is locked away inside the Rainbow Dark Dragon. Jaden is almost defeated but then he hears Jesse's voice calling to him.
152	48	"The Power Within (Part 2 of 2)" / "Activate Super Fusion! Rainbow Neos"; Transliteration: "Chō Yūgō Hatsudō! Reinbō Neosu" (Japanese: 超融合発動!レインボー·ネオス)	Koji Ueda	September 12, 2007	August 9, 2008
The duel between Jaden and Jesse continues. Yubel has finally summnoned Rainbow Dark Dragon and destroyed Neos, but Jaden manages to avoid a finishing blow. He uses Super Poymerization but Yubel uses Last Trick to steal the card from Jaden. But despite all the odds, Jaden just manages to save Jesse from Yubel's clutches, sacrificing the duel to save him. Although both Jesse and Jaden have been injured, Yubel challenges Jaden to their ultimate duel.
153	49	"Return of the Supreme King (Part 1 of 3)" / "Showdown of the Chosen Cards! Elemental Heroes vs. Yubel"; Transliteration: "Eraba Reshi Kādo Taiketsu! Erementaru Hīrō VS Yuberu" (Japanese: 選ばれしカード対決!エレメンタル·ヒーローVSユベル)	Junki Takegami	September 19, 2007	August 16, 2008
Now that Jesse is freed from Yubel's influence and in no immediate danger, Jaden decides to stop Yubel once and for all. He goes up to where Yubel is waiting and the duel begins again. Syrus soon follows behind him, but Crowler and Jesse stay behind, Jesse entrusting Jaden with his deck of Crystal Beasts.
154	50	"Return of the Supreme King (Part 2 of 3)" / "Supreme King Judai Resurrected!"; Transliteration: "Yomigaeru Haō Jūdai!" (Japanese: 甦る覇王十代!)	Junki Takegami	September 26, 2007	August 16, 2008
The duel between Jaden and Yubel continues. Jaden, who has already made up his decision, resurrects the dark half of his soul, The Supreme King. But this time, he has it under control. He won't let it take over him this time but will instead use it for good so that he can save all of his friends, including Jesse whom he dragged into this and continues to feel guilty about it.
155	51	"Return of the Supreme King (Part 3 of 3)" / "Rainbow Neos vs. Yubel Ultimate Form"; Transliteration: "Reinbō Neosu VS Yuberu Kyūkyoku tai" (Japanese: レインボー·ネオスVSユベル究極態)	Junki Takegami	October 3, 2007	August 23, 2008
Jaden utilizes the "Crystal Beast" cards he was entrusted by Jesse to summon "Rainbow Neos," equipping it with "Rainbow Veil" and launching an attack on Yubel. In turn, Yubel transforms into her second form, activates Demon's Rose, and fends off the damage. Before Jaden defeats Yubel, she uses her powers to transport Jaden into the past and sees that Yubel volunteered to be the guardian protector of the one who has the powers of the Supreme King. It is then revealed to Jaden that back then a young boy who resembled him had the powers of the Supreme King and Yubel took the dragon heart to be his protector for eternity and defeat all evil. In the end, Jaden uses Super Polymerization to fuse his spirit with Yubel. He saves his friends and they go back to their dimension; however, Jaden does not return with them. Note: Along with Jaden, Zane, Bastion, Adrian, and Echo didn't return to their dimension either.
156	52	"Judai Revived!? A Brand New Journey"; Transliteration: "Jūdai Fukkatsu!? Aratanaru Tabidachi" (Japanese: 十代復活!?新たなる旅立ち)	Junki Takegami	October 10, 2007	N/A
Chazz, Alexis, Hassleberry, Syrus, Atticus, Aster, Crowler, Axel, Jim and Jesse have returned to Duel Academy. However Jaden has not been seen. Red Dorm's dining hall, after a week, has been adorned with the pictures of three students: Jaden, Bastion and Zane, none of whom have returned. Chazz looks at Jaden's picture and remembers the first time he dueled Jaden. Syrus believes that Jaden will return, as opposed to Chazz, who himself is overcome with deep emotion. Syrus ends up wishing on a meteoroid. Then, the meteorite crashes and Jaden emerges from inside of it. Note: This is the only Season 3 episode not yet dubbed.
