= Yu-Gi-Oh! 5D's season 1 =

Yu-Gi-Oh! 5D's
- Season 1
- No. of episodes: 26

Release
- Original network: TV Tokyo
- Original release: April 2 – September 24, 2008

Season chronology
- ← Previous; Yu-Gi-Oh! GX; Season 4 Next → Season 2

The first season of the anime show Yu-Gi-Oh! 5D's consists of 26 episodes, and follows Yusei Fudo as he escapes from Satellite, and learns about his destiny as a Signer. The season uses two pieces of theme music; the opening theme is 'Kizuna' by Kra whilst the ending theme is 'Start' by Masataka Nakagauchi. It is known as the Signers Arc in Japan, and the Fortune Cup Duels in the US. It is the first Yu-Gi-Oh! series to be produced in 16:9 widescreen, although it was letterboxed in the United States broadcast.

The official Yu-Gi-Oh! YouTube channel and multiple DVDs combine this season and the next season into one 64-episode season.

== Episode list ==
No. overall	No. in season	Title	Written by	Original release date	American air date
1	1	"On Your Mark, Get Set, Duel! / Riding Duel! Acceleration!"; Transliteration: "Raidingu Dyueru! Akuserarēshon!" (Japanese: ライディング·デュエル! アクセラレーション!)	Atsuhiro Tomioka	April 2, 2008	September 13, 2008
Rally gives Yusei a stolen chip to upgrade his Duel Runner, but they are hunted down by Security forces. Yusei draws their pursuers away, and is dragged into a Turbo Duel against Trudge, one of the Security officers. Trudge summons the powerful Montage Dragon, but Yusei counters with a Synchro monster named Junk Warrior to win the duel. Trudge reluctantly lets Yusei go.
2	2	"Creepy Crawlies / Power Insect Deck! The Ant-Lion Trap!"; Transliteration: "Pawā Insekuto Dekki! Arijigoku no Wana" (Japanese: パワーインセクトデッキ! 蟻地獄の罠)	Atsuhiro Tomioka	April 9, 2008	September 20, 2008
Yusei reflects on his past battle with Jack, vowing to win back his Stardust Dragon card, which the former stole from him. Later, Tank, Nervin, and Blitz are bullied by a group of thugs, led by a person named Lenny. Yusei steps in to help his friends out, and ends up in a duel against Lenny with his Duel Runner at stake. Lenny uses an insect deck, and uses his powerful bugs to quickly gain the upper hand. Yusei then Synchro summons Junk Warrior and uses a combination of Fighting Spirit and Domino Effect to win the duel.
3	3	"Pipe Dreams / Escape! Nitro Warrior vs. Goyo Guardian!"; Transliteration: "Dasshutsu! Nitoro Woriā Bāsasu Goyō Gādian" (Japanese: 脱出! ニトロ·ウォリアーVSゴヨウ·ガーディアン)	Atsuhiro Tomioka	April 16, 2008	September 27, 2008
Yusei begins his ride to New Domino City to face Jack. On the way, Trudge forces him into another Turbo Duel. With only three minutes left to make it out of the pipeline, and Trudge's Gate Blocker preventing him from gaining Speed Counters, Yusei seems to be getting desperate until he pulls out a special monster given to him by Rally. But his plan backfires when Trudge activates a trap to summon out two more Gate Blockers. Then Trudge tunes his Jutte Fighter to one of the Gate blockers to Synchro Summon Goyo Guardian. Yusei counters with Nitro Warrior and attacks Goyo Guardian. Since he activated a speed spell Nitro Warrior gains 1000 ATK during the battle with Goyo Guardian. Yusei then uses Nitro Warrior's special ability to switch the other Gate Blocker to ATK mode and attack it. Yusei makes it to New Domino City and who else but Jack is there to meet him!
4	4	"A Blast from the Past, Part 1 / The Battle of Destiny! Stardust Dragon Stands in the Way"; Transliteration: "Unmei no Taiketsu! Tachihadakaru Sutādasuto Doragon" (Japanese: 運命の対決! 立ちはだかるスターダスト·ドラゴン)	Atsuhiro Tomioka	April 23, 2008	October 4, 2008
Yusei, intending to win back his Stardust Dragon, meets up with Jack and challenges him to a Turbo Duel. The battle begins in the now deserted duel stadium. Yusei finds himself up against not only the fearsome Red Dragon Archfiend, but also his own Stardust Dragon which Jack placed in his deck. Yusei summons Junk Warrior to battle Jack and Jack counters with his ace monster, Red Dragon Archfiend.
5	5	"A Blast from the Past, Part 2 / Ace Dragons Clash! Stardust Dragon vs. Red Demons"; Transliteration: "Gekitotsu-suru Ēsu Doragon! Sutādasuto Bāsasu Reddo Dēmonzu" (Japanese: 激突するエース·ドラゴン! スターダストVSレッド·デーモンズ)	Atsuhiro Tomioka	April 30, 2008	October 11, 2008
Yusei and Jack's battle continues, with Yusei finally regaining control of Stardust Dragon. Both Yusei and Jack's arms burn when Stardust and Red Dragon Archfiend clash, and both their arms start to glow red. Whenever Stardust and Red Dragon Archfiend attack each other the Energy machine spikes with tremendous power. A third Dragon appears in the sky with no clear defined shape that is blazing red. The energy machine finally reached a point where it couldn't take any more and causes a city wide power outage. The duel ends with no victor and the appearance of New Domino City Security forces.
6	6	"The Facility, Part 1 / Look at My Treasured Deck!"; Transliteration: "Mitekure! Washi no Hihō Dekki" (Japanese: 見てくれ! ワシの秘宝デッキ!)	Atsuhiro Tomioka	May 5, 2008	October 18, 2008
Yusei is arrested and sent to a detention center, where he meets an old man named Yanagi, who duels using what he calls his "Hidden Treasure" deck. Yanagi faces off against another prisoner, Bolt Tanner - and is shortly revealed to be a very poor duelist. Although lacking skills, he still cares deeply about his cards, something Yusei can relate to. Meanwhile, Goodwin reviews Jack's duel with Yusei, and discovers that, had they not been interrupted by the appearance of the Crimson Dragon, Jack would have been defeated. Right before they lost power Yusei activated Meteor Stream which deals 1000 points of damage to the opponent when a monster is resummoned to the field. Jack only having 900 life points would have lost the duel.
7	7	"The Facility, Part 2 / Feelings Towards the Cards! Crystal Skull vs. Giant Ushi Oni"; Transliteration: "Kādo ni Kometa Omoi! Suishō Dokuro Bāsasu Ō Ushioni" (Japanese: カードにこめた想い! 水晶ドクロVS大牛鬼)	Atsuhiro Tomioka	May 14, 2008	October 25, 2008
Yusei has had enough of hearing Tanner making fun of Yanagi's cards and dueling skills, so he takes up Yanagi's deck and challenges Tanner to a duel, much to everyone's surprise, since Yusei is not dueling with his usual cards. Yusei wants to teach Tanner that every deck has a winning strategy, regardless of their value to others. Meanwhile, Goodwin reveals to Jack the legend of the People of the Stars, the Signers, and the Crimson Dragon.
8	8	"Fire It Up! / Unfulfilled Soul: the Signers and the Legendary Dragon"; Transliteration: "Mitasarenu Tamashī Shigunā to Densetsu no Ryū" (Japanese: 満たされぬ魂 シグナーと伝説の竜)	Atsuhiro Tomioka	May 21, 2008	November 1, 2008
Yusei is interrogated for information on his Dragon Mark, and Goodwin comes to the detention center to speak with him further. Yanagi tells Yusei what he knows about the Signers and the Five Dragons, and suspects that Yusei's Stardust Dragon may be one of the five. Meanwhile, Jack duels Hunter Pace again, but is off his game after his loss against Yusei.
9	9	"The Lockdown Duel, Part 1 / Feelings Hanging for the Cards: A Planned Lightning Deathmatch"; Transliteration: "Kādo ni Kakeru Omoi Shikumareta Raitoningu Desumacchi" (Japanese: カードにかける思い 仕組まれたライトニング·デスマッチ)	Shin Yoshida	May 28, 2008	November 8, 2008
Yusei is transferred to a different cell, away from Yanagi. His new cellmate, Alex, plans to escape and offers to take Yusei with him, but he refuses to leave without Yanagi and Tanner. Meanwhile, Armstrong has been harassing Tanner, and Yusei ends up in a duel against him, using a deck built with treasured cards given to him by all the other prisoners.
10	10	"The Lockdown Duel, Part 2 / Deck Zero: Break the Chain Trap Loop"; Transliteration: "Dekki Zero Chēn Torappu no Rūpu wo Yabure" (Japanese: デッキ0 チェーントラップのループを破れ)	Shin Yoshida	June 4, 2008	November 15, 2008
Yusei is caught in Armstrong's trap - not only is he forced to discard ten cards each turn, each Life Point lost also delivers a painful electric shock. Armstrong has disabled the electric current to his own Duel Disk, and thus does not feel any pain, until Alex breaks into the control room. He starts the current flowing again, but Armstrong just gets back up and keeps going. Despite the overwhelming odds, Yusei is able to pull through and win the duel using the trap card blasting the ruins. He is allowed to leave the prison.
11	11	"The Take Back, Part 1 / The Special Pursuit Deck Returns: Regain the Bonds with a Friend"; Transliteration: "Tokushu Tsuiseki Dekki Futatabi Torimodose Nakama tono Kizuna" (Japanese: 特殊追跡デッキ再び 取り戻せ仲間との絆)	Yasuyuki Suzuki	June 11, 2008	November 22, 2008
Although he is now out of the detention center, Yusei has noticed that he is being followed by Goodwin's agents. Luckily, he is taken by a former duelist named Blister, the man who Tanner told him could help get his Duel Runner and dueling deck back. After discovering Blister's past, Yusei infiltrates Goodwin's tower and finally recovers his Duel Runner and dueling deck, but not before Trudge shows up and challenges him to another Turbo Duel.
12	12	"The Take Back, Part 2 / Dead Chase! Weave the Bonds, Turbo Warrior"; Transliteration: "Deddo Cheisu! Kizuna wo Tsumuge Tābo Woriā" (Japanese: 死闘追跡! 絆を紡げ ターボ・ウォリアー)	Yasuyuki Suzuki	June 18, 2008	November 29, 2008
Yusei continues to avoid Trudge's brutal direct attacks as he attempts to escape with Blister's help, but things only get harder from there. Despite the danger, Yusei resolves to restore Blister's faith in bonds with other people. When Trudge brings out Goyo Guardian, Yusei tunes four of his weak monsters together to summon Turbo Warrior. Trudge tries to stop him attacking by ramming into Yusei's Duel Runner but Blister holds him off long enough for Yusei to attack with Turbo Warrior and win the duel.
13	13	"A Duel to Remember / Dial On! Roar Morphtronic Deck"; Transliteration: "Daiyaru On! Unare Difōmā Dekki" (Japanese: ダイヤル·オン! うなれディフォーマーデッキ)	Atsuhiro Tomioka	June 25, 2008	December 6, 2008
Yusei is able to escape from the police, but crashes his Duel Runner and is knocked unconscious. When he wakes up, he has been rescued and hidden from the police by fraternal twins Leo and Luna, prodigy duelists who live in the Tops area at New Domino City. Rejoiced to see that Yusei is alright, Leo asks him for a friendly duel-Yusei's Junk deck against Leo's Morphtronic deck.: This is the debut appearance of the fraternal twin dueling prodigies Leo and Luna.; In the English version, Yusei suffers from amnesia following his crash, and Leo duels him in order to restore it.
14	14	"Bloom of the Black Rose / The Bringer of Folklore Destruction Appears, "The Black Rose""; Transliteration: "Arawareru Fōkuroa Hakai o Motarasu "Kurobara no Majo"" (Japanese: 現れるフォークロア破壊をもたらす 「黒薔薇の魔女」)	Atsuhiro Tomioka	July 2, 2008	December 13, 2008
While preparing for the Fortune Cup with Blister, Yusei is reunited with Tanner and Yanagi. As they prepare to test out Yusei's Deck, they're confronted by Jack, who returns Stardust Dragon to Yusei. Later, Leo & his friend Dexter tells him about a duelist called "The Black Rose" (called "Black Rose Witch" in the Japanese version). When she appears before them, and starts causing real damage to the environment via her unusually strong psionic abilities, the Mark of the Dragon on Yusei's arm begins to react to hers.
15	15	"Welcome to the Fortune Cup / The Duel of Fortune Cup Begins: Attack from the Sky!! Giant Bomber Air Raid"; Transliteration: "Dyueru Obu Fōchūn Kappu Kaimaku Daikūshū!! Jaianto Bomā Eareido" (Japanese: デュエル·オブ·フォーチューンカップ開幕 大空襲!!ジャイアントボマー·エアレ イド)	Atsuhiro Tomioka	July 9, 2008	December 20, 2008
The Fortune Cup has officially begun and the first duel pits Greiger against Leo, who is disguised as his sister Luna, as she did not wish to participate. Greiger's aircraft machine monsters are giving Leo's Morphtronic monsters a hard time. Meanwhile, Zigzix, Goodwin's scientist, puts his latest invention to the test: A device that detects Signers and their extraordinary special abilities. But Leo is unaffected while Luna is. Leo loses his duel, and Zigzix finds out that Luna was in the stands during the duel.
16	16	"Battle with The Black Rose / Reunion with The Witch: The Dragon of Destruction, "Black Rose Dragon""; Transliteration: "Majosairai, Hametsu no Ryū "Burakku Rōzu Doragon"" (Japanese: 魔女再来, 破滅の竜 ｢ブラック・ローズ・ドラゴン｣)	Shuichi Koyama	July 16, 2008	December 27, 2008
The next duel in the Fortune Cup pits Gill de Randsborg vs. Akiza Izinski. Randsborg has learned from Goodwin and Lazar that Akiza is the Black Rose. At first, his Masked Knight leveled monsters seem to give him a clear advantage, until Akiza lets everyone in the stadium witness the dangers of her plant monsters, field spell card and finally, her Black Rose Dragon.
17	17	"Surprise, Surprise / Flame Revenger: Speed King Skull Flame"; Transliteration: "Honō no Ribenjā Supīdokingu ☆ Sukaru Fureimu" (Japanese: 炎のリベンジャー スピード・キング☆スカル・フレイム)	Yoshifumi Fukushima	July 23, 2008	January 3, 2009
Next up in the Fortune Cup is a Turbo Duel between Yusei and a mysterious caped duelist called Shiro. To Yusei's and Jack's surprise, the challenger is actually Hunter Pace who took the real Shiro's place and disguise shortly before the duel starts. Yusei must now face Pace's deck filled with powerful Fire monsters, an improved deck which Pace planned to use against Jack later on.
18	18	"Return to the Spirit World, Part 1 / The Ancient Forest: Invitation to the Spirits' World"; Transliteration: "Inishie no Mori Seirei Sekai eno Izanai" (Japanese: 古の森 精霊世界への誘い)	Yasuyuki Suzuki	July 30, 2008	January 10, 2009
The first round of the Fortune Cup is over, but Rex Goodwin is holding a consolation match, which opposes Professor Frank against the real Luna, much to Leo's disappointment. Not only is Luna reluctant to duel, but the duel itself is planned to uncover her Signer abilities, which turn out to be spiritual and some forms of extrasensory, whereas Akiza's are psychic. Furthermore, Frank has a stirring speech that sends Luna into a trance-like state, disrupting her dueling capabilities and sending her mind to the realm of Duel Monster Spirits.
19	19	"Return to the Spirit World, Part 2 / The Contaminated Spirit World: Evil Intent, Ido the Supreme Magical God"; Transliteration: "Osensareru Seirei Sekai Akunaru Ishi Chōmajin Ido" (Japanese: 汚染される精霊世界 悪なる意思 超魔神イド)	Yasuyuki Suzuki	August 6, 2008	January 17, 2009
Luna engages in her duel with Professor Frank when she hears a mysterious voice saying: "You said... you'd protect the world of Duel Monsters spirits." Then, the voice takes shape in the form of Ancient Fairy Dragon. Now, Luna must take all her courage and skill at hand to defeat Frank's trump card.
20	20	"Second Round Showdown, Part 1 / Unweavering Feelings: My Mission is For My Hometown and My Friends"; Transliteration: "Yuzurenai Omoi Waga Shimei wa Kokyō to Tomo ni" (Japanese: 譲れない想い 我が使命は故郷と共に)	Shin Yoshida	August 13, 2008	January 24, 2009
The first day of the Fortune Cup comes to a close. The audience's attention is cast to an image of Greiger, who shall face Yusei tomorrow. As Tanner says that he wonders what kind of Duel Runner Greiger uses, something comes to Leo's mind, causing him to run off. Greiger finds him and brings him back to Yusei and explains to him why he's fighting.
21	21	"Second Round Showdown, Part 2 / Greiger's Revenge: The Trap of Sorrow, Chariot Pile"; Transliteration: "Fukushū no Bomā Kanashimi no Torappu Chariotto Pairu" (Japanese: 復讐のボマー 悲しみのトラップ チャリオット·パイル)	Shin Yoshida	August 20, 2008	January 31, 2009
Greiger successfully summons Flying Fortress SKY FIRE and uses its effect to prevent Yusei playing his cards correctly. What Yusei doesn't know is that Greiger holds Goodwin responsible for the destruction of his home village. Yusei manages to defeat Greiger, who reveals what Goodwin had done and tries to assassinate him by driving his Duel Runner into him, but Yusei stops him. A spike from Greiger's Duel Runner comes off and heads straight for Goodwin but he stops it with his left hand, revealing that he has a mechanical left arm.
22	22	"The Profiler / The Past Revealed: The Duel Profiler vs. The Black Rose Witch"; Transliteration: "Abakareru Kako Dyueru Purofairā Bāsasu Kurobara no Majo" (Japanese: 暴かれる過去 デュエルプロファイラ-VS黒薔薇の魔女)	Atsuhiro Tomioka	August 27, 2008	February 7, 2009
The second round of the finals pits Akiza against Commander Koda. Koda has been ordered by Goodwin to expose Akiza as a Signer, which didn't work on Akiza's last duel. Furthermore, Koda can expose his opponents' past to disable them. He doesn't take long to expose Akiza's troublesome reputation as the Black Rose, awakening painful memories to Akiza and revealing her to be a Signer.
23	23	"Duel of the Dragons, Part 1 / The Final Match: The Soul Hidden Behind the Mask"; Transliteration: "Fainaru Macchi, Kamen no Oku ni Kakusareta Kokoro" (Japanese: 決勝戦, 仮面の奥に隠された心)	Yasuyuki Suzuki	September 3, 2008	February 14, 2009
Before the final rounds of the Fortune Cup commences, Yusei confronts and questions Akiza within an inner passage of the Dueling Stadium of why does she calls the Mark of the Dragon a "Wretched Mark." She then angrily responds that she hates and detests the person who carries a birthmark. Furthermore while becoming angry, Akiza feels that something remains hidden within her. Yusei, who is filled with various doubts, begins his duel with Akiza, noting that Akiza appears to be enjoying inflicting pain on others.
24	24	"Duel of the Dragons, Part 2 / Victim's Sanctuary: Become the Star that Envelops Destruction! Stardust Dragon"; Transliteration: "Vikutemu Sankuchuari Hakai wo Tsutsumu Hoshi to Nare! Sutādasuto Doragon" (Japanese: ヴィクテム·サンクチュアリ 破壊を包む星となれ! スターダスト·ドラゴン)	Yasuyuki Suzuki	September 10, 2008	February 21, 2009
The duel between Yusei and Akiza continues, and Akiza quickly gains the upper hand. Yusei, from his part, manages to put a good defense against Akiza's plant-type monsters with Junk Warrior, but also notices that Akiza takes a guiltless pleasure at attacking him mercilessly. She unleashes her full power and puts on her mask, whilst Yusei tries to reason with her. The duel ends with Yusei emerging victorious using a combination of Stardust Dragon and Cosmic Blast. Akiza's mask is broken, which reveals that she is crying, and Akiza begs Yusei to help her. However, Sayer intervenes, and takes her away.
25	25	"The Fortune Cup Finale, Part 1 / The Fortune Cup Finals! The Lonely King, Jack Atlas"; Transliteration: "Fōchun Kappu Fainaru! Kokō no Kingu Jakku Atorasu" (Japanese: フォーチュンカップ ファイナル! 孤高のキング ジャック·アトラス)	Shin Yoshida	September 17, 2008	February 28, 2009
Yusei wins his match against Akiza, but feels reluctant about it since he couldn't help her as much as he would have wished. He also notices that his birthmark has become permanent. He then rushes to Goodwin's tower in order to rescue his friends, but what he finds is Jack along with Goodwin, and he explains how his rivalry with Yusei all began. Shortly after, the final duel between Jack and Yusei takes place, and to Yusei's surprise, his friends from Satellite are safe and sound, freed from the container that served as prison in Satellite, and they all watch Yusei as he duels. The duel starts with Jack taking an early lead but Yusei counters and catches up but then Jack summons his best card, the Red Dragon Archfiend.
26	26	"The Fortune Cup Finale, Part 2 / Destiny of the Signers! The Future Guided by the Crimson Dragon!"; Transliteration: "Shigunā-tachi no Unmei! Akaki Ryū ga Michibiku Mirai" (Japanese: シグナーたちの運命! 赤き竜が導く未来!)	Shin Yoshida	September 24, 2008	March 7, 2009
The Fortune Cup Finals continue as Yusei summons Stardust Dragon to battle Jack's Red Dragon Archfiend. As the battle goes on, the Crimson Dragon appears, fuelled by all the Signer's marks, including one from a severed arm in Goodwin's possession. The Crimson Dragon shows Yusei, Jack, Akiza, and Luna bizarre visions of the People of the Stars, and the futures of both Satellite, and New Domino City, with both locations together being engulfed in a Spider-shaped geoglyph of purple fire. Yusei and Jack continue their duel, which finally ends with Yusei emerging victorious, and both Jack and Yusei are returned to the Kaiba Dome. Yusei then becomes the new Duel King.
