= Kuroko's Basketball season 3 =

Third season of the Kuroko's Basketball anime television series

Kuroko's Basketball
- Season 3
- Box art of the third season's first Blu-ray compilation released on April 24, 2015
- No. of episodes: 25

Release
- Original network: MBS TV, Tokyo MX, BS11
- Original release: January 10 – June 30, 2015

Season chronology
- ← Previous; Season 2

The third and final season of Kuroko's Basketball anime series is produced by Production I.G. It is based on the manga series of the same name written and illustrated by Tadatoshi Fujimaki. The third season premiered on January 10, 2015 and ended on June 30, 2015, with a total of 25 episodes.

The third season has three opening and ending themes each. This first opening is "Punky Funky Love" by Granrodeo while the ending is "Glitter Days" by Fox Tails. The second opening is "ZERO" by Kenshō Ono while the ending theme is "Ambivalence" by Screen Mode. The third opening theme is "Memories" by Granrodeo while the ending theme is "Lantana" by Old Codex.

An original video animation was included on the final volume of Kuroko's Basketball (Volume 9), which was released on December 24, 2015. On January 14, 2017, Crunchyroll later added the anime to their streaming service.

On October 19, 2020, the SAG-AFTRA listed and approved an English dub for the series under the "Netflix Dubbing Agreement". The English dub third season premiered on Netflix on September 18, 2021.

== Episode list ==
No. overall	No. in season	Title	Original release date
51	1	"I'm Just Going at Full Strength"; Transliteration: "Zenryoku de Yatteru dake Nande" (Japanese: 全カでやってるだけなんで)	January 10, 2015
Upon defeating Yōsen High, Seirin is interviewed for Basketball Monthly, after which Kagami heads outside to visit with his old friend, Tatsuya Himuro, and Alex. However, instead of being able to resolve their differences, he runs into Shogo Haizaki of Fukuda Sogo Gakuen. When Kagami arrives, he sees Haizaki gripping Alex from the throat, and stops him. Haizaki tries to punch Kagami who tries hitting him back, only to be stopped by Himuro. Kagami heads back in to ask Kuroko about this news only to find out the final quarterfinal will feature a showdown between Kise and Haizaki, with the winner moving on to face Seirin in the semifinals.
52	2	"This Is Mine"; Transliteration: "Ore no Mon da" (Japanese: オレのもんだ)	January 17, 2015
Kise and Haizaki face each other head-to-head for the right to advance to face Seirin. Kuroko reveals that Haizaki uses psychological warfare against his opponents. Although Kuroko copies the moves of the individual, he also alters the timing of the move. When the original user tries to do the move again, they try to do so with the new timing and ultimately fail. Kise and his teammates fall further behind as the second half begins.
53	3	"Don't You Get In My Way"; Transliteration: "Jama Sunja Nee yo" (Japanese: ジャマすんじゃねーよ)	January 24, 2015
Kise and Haizaki continue their face-off, and the former's pain from his injury increases. As Haizaki taunts Kise about the past, Kise's teammates and friends become worried. Suddenly, Kuroko yells out to Kise that he believes in him and Returning to his numb state, Kise claims that he will win and decides to resort to using his final copies known as the Perfect Copy. A desperate Haizaki uses a dirty trick near the end of the game, but Kise is adamant about winning despite how much pain his foot is in and defeats Haizaki. Kaijo wins 75–72 against Fukuda Sogo Gakuen. After the match Haizaki stands outside waiting for Kise to hurt him in a last attempt to put down Kise. However Aomine arrives and warns Haizaki not to interfere. Haizaki mocks his words and is about to punch him, but Aomine eventually punches him in the face first, temporarily knocking Haizaki out. Now uncertain about his resolve, Haizaki goes away without throwing his shoes in for the first time.
54	4	"I'll Take This For Now"; Transliteration: "Morattokuwa" (Japanese: もらっとくわ)	January 31, 2015
The second semi-finals for the Winter Cup is about to start with Rakuzan, Shūtoku, Seirin, and Kaijo vying for the semi-finalist position. Kagami realized that his shoes are broken and needs to buy new ones, but could not find anything his size. Kuroko contacted Momo for help and she brought Daiki's basketball shoes, the same brand that Kagami likes. Daiki told Kagami that in order for him to get the shoes, he should defeat him in a one-on-one battle first, in which Kagami quickly lost. Kagami and Kuroko rushed to the venue of the Winter Cup to watch the first semi-finals match between Rakuzan and Shūtoku.
55	5	"I Know None of That"; Transliteration: "Watashi wa Sore o Mattaku Shirimasen" (Japanese: 私はそれを全く知りません)	February 7, 2015
As the second half of the match between Shutoku and Rakuzan starts, Akashi uses his eye. He was revealed to be the one who found Kuroko's talent by using his eye on him, which meant that the eye can see potential of people, but it is said that in matches the eye is completely different, it predicts the future movement of the other players, thus nullifying both offence and defense of the other team.
56	6	"I Will Offer Them"; Transliteration: "Watashi wa Sorera o Teikyō shimasu" (Japanese: 私はそれらを提供します)	February 14, 2015
Takao and Midorima's team play, makes a comeback with support from the rest of the team. Kuroko, Kise, and Murasakibara explain that it is the first time that the players from Generation of Miracles never played at their full potential, since it would be not only tax their bodies, but also no one would be able to play against them if they did. Seeing the Shutoku make threes one after the other, Akashi throws the ball in their own basket, and tells his team that if they can only concentrate when the lead is small, he would bring down their lead. Hearing this, Rakuzan team recovers. Akashi also announces to Midorima that he will not be able to shoot again. Akashi stops the next pass between Takao and Midorima which becomes a turning point in the game.
57	7	"It Makes Me Laugh"; Transliteration: "Sore wa Watashi ni Warai o Tsukurimasu" (Japanese: それは私に笑いを作ります)	February 21, 2015
As Rakuzan won the game 86–70, Akashi refuses to shake hands with Midorima, since he wishes to remain a foe to all for them to win. In a match between Seirin and Kaijo, Kuroko tells Kise that he saw him as a rival, since he passed him quickly after Kuroko became Kise's mentor in middle school. Seirin hopes to gain a lead in the early stages of the game before Kise uses his unstoppable Perfect Copy. However, this plan is thwarted as Kise immediately initiates the Perfect Copy and returns the favor with Midorima's full court shot. Seirin attempts to fight back, but Kagami is overcome by Kise's Emperor Eye, which he can imitate as close to the original as possible. By combining Aomine's agility and Murasakibara's defensive capabilities, a shocked Kise blocks the unblockable Phantom Shot, leaving Kuroko depressed.
58	8	"True Light"; Transliteration: "Shin no Hikari" (Japanese: 真の光)	February 28, 2015
Kise continues to play his Perfect Copy until the score reaches 13–2 and stops it afterwards, believing he has given the game momentum. Seirin becomes too eager to close the gap and starts making misses. Riko sends Furihata and subs out Izuki. Although Furihata initially seemed nervous, Riko mentions that he will be cautious since he is a coward, he'll be cautious. This also calms down the entire team and Seirin begins to score. Izumi is subbed in and set against Kasamatsu, which becomes a showdown between the aces as the latter cannot shoot.
59	9	"Don't Belittle Us!!"; Transliteration: "Namen janee" (Japanese: ナメんじゃねぇ!!)	March 7, 2015
Kise is subbed out after the coach spots his leg injury beginning to detoriate. As Kagami gets double teamed, Kuroko scores using his Phantom Shot. Kasamatsu figures out the trick and stops Kuroko's Phantom Shot, exposing the trick just before he is subbed out. As Kise continues to heal his leg, Kasamatsu's incredible play brings scores for Kaijo.
60	10	"In Order to Win"; Transliteration: "Katsu tame ni" (Japanese: 勝つために)	March 14, 2015
When Kise's injury becomes worse, his coach orders him to step off the court for a while and rest until the last two minutes of the last quarter wherein he could use his Perfect Copy. With the help of the team, especially Kiyoshi and Izuki, Kagami can take control of the game and give Seirin 15-point gap in the lead with four minutes left in the match. Suddenly, Kise returns to the court despite his coach's opposition, remarking on how the ace's job is to lead the team to victory. He immediately overcomes Kagami with Akashi's Emperor Eye and dunks right on Kiyoshi. With the help of Kuroko's Ignite Pass, Kagami attempts to score back, but Kise uses Murasakibara's impenetrable block to prevent this. Much to the shock of Seirin and Rico, Kise copies Kuroko's Ignite pass, launching the ball across the court and allowing Kaijo to score again.
61	11	"This Time, For Sure"; Transliteration: "Kondokoso" (Japanese: 今度こそ)	March 21, 2015
Kaijo makes a slow comeback with its ace, Kise, and returnsto the court. The former takes the lead with a score of 78–77. Seirin becomes restless and their moves become stiff as Kise's fast recovery and Kaijo's persistence to win cause the crowd to cheer, putting Seirin under pressure. Kuroko devises a plan that requires time for observation to overcome Kise's Perfect Copy.
62	12	"He is the Best Player"; Transliteration: "Saikō no Senshu desu" (Japanese: 最高の選手です)	March 28, 2015
As Kaijo leads by one point, Seirin begins the counter attack in run-and-gun method, surprising Kaijo and the audience. Kagami passes the ball to onrushing Kuroko through backboard, who scores a buzzer beater. Kise congratulates Kuroko and Kagami for reaching finals, with Kuroko acknowledging with Kagami that Kise is the best player. While leaving from locker room, Kagami realizes he lost his ring and goes to check in the basketball court. Midorima gives him one and the two of them talk about the results of their matches.
63	13	"A Day with Blue Skies"; Transliteration: "Aoi Sora no Hi" (Japanese: 青い空の日)	April 4, 2015
Kuroko is first placed into Teiko's third string basketball team. However, after practicing everyday after school with Aomine, Akashi realized Kuroko talent as the "Phantom 6th Man." During a match between the third and second string, Kuroko proved himself and was upgraded to first string. Moreoever, when Kuroko plays in a friendly match as starting player, he is so nervous he is subbed out immediately. The coaches are unsure if they should keep him on first string, but with Aomine's encouragement, they keep him on for one day. Now that Kuroko's nerves are under control, his help in the team is obvious and he is permanently placed on the first string bench.
64	14	"....Sorry"; Transliteration: "...Warii" (Japanese: 。。。ワリィ)	April 11, 2015
Nijimura gives the captain position to Akashi because his father is sick. Akashi now becomes captain. The Teiko coach comes back. As Midorima and Murasakibara get into a fight, Kuroko challenges them into a practice game. Akashi wants to get rid of Haizaki because he keeps skipping practices. Aomine plays a match, but he does not have fun and loses interest in basketball because he crushed the other team. Teiko goes to the National qualifiers, and Aomine meets his friend, while the face of Kuroko's friend is also revealed. Aomine ends up crushing his friend's team and gets called a monster by his friend.
65	15	"We No Longer"; Transliteration: "Bokura wa Mou" (Japanese: 僕らはもう)	April 18, 2015
The head coach advises Aomine to keep playing basketball until he can find a worthy opponent. As the head coach collapses, the assistant coach is forced to take over the program. The individual members of the team begin to undergo rapid development in strength and ability. Aomine leaves in the middle of practice one day, and the reluctant coach gives him permission to skip practices as long as he shows up to games, leaving Aomine in despai. The members of the Generation of Miracles are shocked as Murasakibara seems to make Akashi overwhelmed. However, just as Akashi is about to lose, he switches personalities and crushes Murasakibara. Now in his alternate persona, Akashi gives the rest of the team permission to skip practice so long as they win matches. He later tells Kuroko, who failed to convince Aomine to return to practice, that there are actually two of him.
66	16	"What is Victory?"; Transliteration: "Shōri tte Nan desu ka?" (Japanese: 勝利ってなんですか？)	April 25, 2015
Kuroko gets knocked unconscious in the game before the grand final, in which Teiko is set to play against Kuroko's friend, Shige's team. Kuroko regains consciousness and asks Akashi to make Teiko play their best since he cannot play in the match. Bored by scoring quotas, Teiko decides to play a new game. Kuroko gets to the match in time to see the conclusion of the game, with Murasakibara scoring the final goal for the opposite team to make the score reads 110–11. Devastated, Kuroko decides to quit basketball and visits Shige's school, where he finds out Shige has transferred and is going to quit basketball. Shige's friend tells him not to quit basketball, because he thinks Kuroko can melt the Generation of Miracles' hearts.
67	17	"Final Tip-off!!"; Transliteration: "Fainaru Tippu-ofu!!" (Japanese: 決勝戦試合開始！！(ファイナル ティップ オフ))	May 2, 2015
Kagami and Tatsuya reconcile as Seirin prepares mentally for the grand final match of the Winter Cup. The teams from previous matches, including ones of the Generation of Miracles, come to watch the grand final. During the third place play-off, Kise sits out of the match and Shutoku wins 96–54 against Kaijo, taking third place. As Rakuzan and Seirin warm up, Akashi declares the winner will be Rakuzan. Furihata gives Kuroko a wristband filled with the team's thoughts. The match starts with Kagami taking the tip-off. Kuroko fumbles a pass, but Kagami eventually scores the first goal with an impossible jump and enters "the zone".
68	18	"Isn't it the Best?"; Transliteration: "Saikō ja ne no?" (Japanese: 最高じゃねーの？)	May 9, 2015
Kagami dangerously continues using up his stamina in the zone, Riko swaps Kuroko for Mitobe so that Kagami can focus on offence. Akashi pairs up against Kagami and Akashi takes control of the game until Mitobe's defense breaks the flow. As agami exits the zone, Kuroko re-enters the match and is more visible than usual, which Akashi claims is due to his learning how to dribble and shoot. Heartbroken, Kuroko is taken out of the match for one side pass, then puts back in for the remainder of the first quarter which finishes with 21–21 draw. Kuroko is set to sit out the second quarter to think of a solution. Meanwhile Chihiro Mayuzumi of Rakuzan reveals his ability to misdirect just like Kuroko, but with better base attributes.
69	19	"A Miracle will not Hpapen"; Transliteration: "Kiseki wa Okinai" (Japanese: 奇跡は起きない)	May 16, 2015
Kuroko observes Mayuzumi's play from the sidelines. Seirin subs in first-year student Furihata to lure Rakuzan, but he quickly gets fatigued after facing Akashi. Fukuda, a first-year student, takes his place. Hyuga goes up against Reo Mibuchi of Rakuzan, who Hyuga admired in middle school, in a "Battle of the shooting guards", but loses. The same happens to Kiyoshi against Eikichi Nebuya. Another first-year takes Fukuda's place. One-by-one, Rakuzan crushes Seirin's players. Akashi demonstrates that he can also make alley-oops, finishing the second quarter with Rakuzan in the 62–37 lead.
70	20	"Weight of Resolve"; Transliteration: "Kakugo no Omosa" (Japanese: 覚悟の重さ)	May 23, 2015
The third quarter starts with Kuroko remaining on the sidelines. The rest of the team persisting despite the setbacks of the previous quarter and the rest of the generation of miracles believing they will lose. The team entrusts their hopes with Hyuga and Kagami. Reo goads Hyuga into making his third and fourth fouls, forcing him to be benched. With Seirin's hearts broken, Kuroko re-enters the game, declaring he wants to win. Kuroko goes up against Mayuzumi, and allows him to make some shoots in order for Kuroko to regain his lack of presence. Kagami re-enters the zone. Instead of subbing Mayuzumi out, Akashi uses him as a tool of misdirection.
71	21	"In My Own Way, I'm Desperate"; Transliteration: "Kore demo Hisshida yo" (Japanese: これでも必死だよ)	May 30, 2015
Izuki interferes with Rakuzan's Kitari Hayama's five-finger-dribble offense, by predicting future moves and coordinating with Kuroko and Kagami. Kagami remains in the zone as Koganei faces Reo. Although Koganei does not defeat him, Hyuga comes to understand how to beat Reo's three specialty shots (Heaven, Earth, Void).
72	22	"A Warning"; Transliteration: "Chūkoku da" (Japanese: 忠告だ)	June 6, 2015
Hyuga rejoins the match in fourth quarter and scores the first three goals, but pushes back against his opponent Eikichi Nebuya despite Kiyoshi's knee injury. Akashi relieves control of the ball against Kagami who is going even deeper in the zone. Seirin calls a timeout with Rakuzan in the 90–78 lead and puts their faith in Kagami. When Aomine mentions that he suspects there is a greater zone, Kagami needs to open this second "door" to be able to beat Akashi.
73	23	"Why Don't We Give Up?"; Transliteration: "Akiramemasen ka" (Japanese: 諦めませんか)	June 13, 2015
Faced by Akashi's huge zone of defense, Kagami despairs, having reached the bottom of the zone, but seeing no way to open the "door". Kuroko suggests they give up relying solely on Kagami for now, and offers to take some of the burden. By watching and predicting Kagami's movement, Kuroko becomes Kagami's "eye" and can intercept Akashi. Despite being stunned, Akashi catches up and attempts to stop Kagami, but is intercepted again by Kuroko. A voice inside Akashi starts telling him to give up. Rakuzan calls a time out with five minutes left in the match, leading to a 92–90 victory. Just as Rakuzan's coach is about to sub Akashi out, Mayuzumi chastises Akashi by wondering who he is, which triggers an internal dialogue with his other self. Akashi strove for victory to keep his team together and in his weakness he created his other self. His two sidesseem to merge, he declares himself "Akashi Seijuro".
74	24	"So It Was You"; Transliteration: "Omaedattan janē ka" (Japanese: お前だったんじゃねーか)	June 20, 2015
Akashi starts supporting the team by setting up perfect opportunities which also boosts their morale. The watching members of the Generation of Miracles recognize Akashi's old self. Seirin still manage to score, but Akashi enters the zone again and Akashi's support draws out his team members' potentials, making them enter an imperfect version of the zone, possible because they are members of the "Uncrowned Kings". Kagami is the only one who can stand against them, but reaches his physical limits, and exits the zone. Aomine, Kise, Midorima and other past opponents adds their cheers, and the crowd starts to chant for Seirin. With Rakuzan in the 103–96 lead and tow minutes left in the match, Kagami talks with the team and completely open the "True Zone".
75	25	"Many Times Over"; Transliteration: "Nandodemo" (Japanese: 何度でも)	June 30, 2015
With 40 seconds left in the game, Rakuzan is in the lead, 105–98. Kagami scores with 27 seconds left. With 17 seconds left, Izuki is the only one not fired up, deliberately trying to keep calm and use his head to catch Rakuzan off-guard. He predicts that Rakuzan will take a shot and steals the ball, making a perfect pass to Hyuga. Hyuga forces a foul as he scores a three and is allowed a free throw. Hyuga's shot rebounds and Kiyoshi uses his last strength to take it. With three seconds left the ball is passed to Kuroko, who goes to shoot. Akashi defends but Kuroko states "I am the shadow", and Kagami does one of his impossible jumps to dunk and Seirin win, 105–106, winning the Winter Cup. Akashi experiences his first ever loss, but is thankful to Kuroko and congratulates him with tears in his eyes. Some days later, Seirin see Kiyoshi off at the airport, as he is going overseas to get surgery for his knee. Meanwhile 3rd years from Seirin's opponent teams are studying for college, while their teams appoint new captains and prepare for the next season of Basketball. Seirin return to school to practice but Kuroko is late. Kagami is sent to find him, and Kuroko explains that he was getting a photo from Momoi. As Kuroko and Kagami head back to practice, Kuroko's locker opens to reveal the photo: a team photo of the Generation of Miracles reunited.
75.5	25.5	"The Greatest Present"; Transliteration: "Saikō no Puresento desu" (Japanese: 最高のプレセントです)	December 24, 2015
