= Kuroko's Basketball season 2 =

Second season of the Kuroko's Basketball anime

Kuroko's Basketball
- Season 2
- Box art of the second season's first Blu-ray compilation released on January 29, 2014
- No. of episodes: 25

Release
- Original network: MBS TV, Tokyo MX, BS11
- Original release: October 6, 2013 – March 29, 2014

Season chronology
- ← Previous; Season 1 Next → Season 3

The second season of Kuroko's Basketball anime series is produced by Production I.G. It is based on the manga series of the same name written and illustrated by Tadatoshi Fujimaki. The second season premiered on October 6, 2013 and ended on March 29, 2014, also with 25 episodes. The DVD and Blu-ray version of the second season was released on June 20, 2014, along with an episode which was designed around a specific chapter in the manga by Tadatoshi Fujimaki by working on chapter 124, and a bonus CD with an audio drama starring Satsuki Momoi.

For the second season, Granrodeo sang both opening themes: the first one is "The Other Self", and the second is "Ever-changing Magical Star" (変幻自在のマジカルスター Hengen Jizai no Majikarusutā). Its ending theme is "Walk" by the band Old Codex, which also sang the second ending theme of the first season. The second ending to the second season is "Fantastic Tune" by Kenshō Ono, the voice actor for the series' main protagonist, Tetsuya Kuroko.

On October 19, 2020, the SAG-AFTRA listed and approved an English dub for the series under the "Netflix Dubbing Agreement". The English-dubbed second season debuted on Netflix on May 15, 2021.

== Episode list ==
No. overall	No. in season	Title	Original release date
26	1	"I've Never Thought We'd Meet Here"; Transliteration: "Konna Tokorode Au to wa na" (Japanese: こんな所で会うとはな)	October 6, 2013
The first years participate in a street basketball tournament, with Kiyoshi subbing in for Kawahara. They run into Seiho and learn that only the top eight teams from the Inter-High can participate in the Winter Cup heats. Seiho loses to a team with a member from Yosen, Himuro Tatsuya, whom Kagami knows from America. Tatsuya introduced Kagami to basketball, and they became close friends to the point of calling each other brothers and wearing matching rings. However, their rivalry led to a misunderstanding between them, and Tatsuya bet his ring on their next game. Meanwhile, Riko tells the second year students the results of the Inter-High: First place Rakuzan, Second is Touou, Third was Yosen; with all the members of the 'Generation of Miracles' benched for the semi-finals and finals. As the tip-off begins between Tatsuya's team and Seirin, Murasakibara Atsushi, another member of the Generation of Miracles, from Yosen High, shows up.
27	2	"At The Winter Cup"; Transliteration: "Uintā Kappu de" (Japanese: ウインターカップで)	October 13, 2013
Murasakibara mentions he did not play in the finals because Akashi Seijuro, the former captain of the generation of miracles, told him not to. Kagami baits Murasakibara into joining the street ball match. Tatsuya asks Murasakibara to play defence while he handles offence, but the game is soon called off due to heavy rain. Kuroko explains that Murasakibara does not like basketball but plays to win and is good at it. Meanwhile, Momoi shows up at Seirin, where the second years are practicing. The first year students and Kiyoshi return to Seirin, where Momoi explains that Aomine didn't play in the Inter-High finals due to injuries sustained during the Kaijo-Touou match. She also explains why Akashi and Murasakibara did not play. Later, Kuroko shows Momoi his new technique, an "unstoppable drive".
28	3	"Start!!!"; Transliteration: "Shidō!!!" (Japanese: 始動！！！)	October 20, 2013
The Winter Cup preliminaries begin with Seirin versing Josei High. A member of Josei recognizes Kiyoshi as "The Iron Heart", one of five players who would have been considered prodigies of their time if not for the Generation of Miracles. Kagami is suppressed by a double team defense, but Kiyoshi's "Right of postponement" and rebounds have improved Seirin's offense and defense and Seirin takes control of the whole match. Using his pent up energy, Kagami breaks past his defenders and scores the final goal with an impressive jump that cracks open the "door" to such prodigies as the Generation of Miracles. Seirin win, 108–61.
29	4	"There's Only One Answer"; Transliteration: "Kotae wa Hitotsu ni Kimatte iru" (Japanese: 答えは一つに決まっている)	October 27, 2013
Three other teams advance to the championship league along with Seirin; Shutoku High, Senshinkan High and Kirisaki Dai Ichi High. Seirin's first opponent is Senshinkan who are known as the "King of the West". Seirin easily win 78–61. Meanwhile, Kirisaki Dai Ichi have thrown their match against Shutoku so that their first-string players can watch the Seirin match. Kiyoshi greets a member of Kirisaki Dai Ichi named Makoto Hanamiya, who is an "Uncrowned King" like him and known as a dishonest player. Seirin's next match is against Shutoku. Riko predicts there is a limit to the number of super-long three-pointers Midorima can shoot, but Midorima has undergone endurance training and plans to outlast Kagami's jumps.
30	5	"I've Been Waiting For This"; Transliteration: "Matteta ze" (Japanese: 待ってたぜ)	November 3, 2013
Seirin keeps a lead against Shutoku to the second quarter, 23–16. But Kagami grows ever more tired, and Takao's hawk eye is a formidable weapon against Kuroko's Misdirection. Midorima starts faking and passing meaning that Kagami exerts more energy per shot that Midorima takes. Kiyoshi and Kagami double team against Midorima, leaving the inside wide open. Kuroko is subbed out for Mitobe. The match proceeds with Seirin's fast run-and-gun gameplay but the second quarter ends with Seirin barely in the lead, 45–43. Shutoku pull ahead in the third quarter 68–76 with one minute to go. And Kagami's legs are at their limit. Kuroko asks to be subbed back in, ready to use his new drive.
31	6	"I Surpassed You Long Ago"; Transliteration: "Tō no Mukashi ni Koeteiru" (Japanese: とうの昔に超えている)	November 10, 2013
Kuroko re-enters the match and takes on Midorima, easily passing him with his Vanishing Drive, and Seirin catch up to Shutoku with the third quarter ending in a draw. In the fourth quarter, Midorima states that he passed his limits long ago, while Seirin and Shutoku exchange goals. With less than 30 seconds left, Otsubo's shot puts Shutoku up 104–103. With his legs already at their limits, Kiyoshi attempts a dunk, but is disrupted by Midorima, who earns a foul. With two seconds left, Kiyoshi makes the first free throw, bringing the scores to a tie. He misses the second shot, and Kagami catches the rebound. Kagami goes for a final dunk which Midorima attempts to block. The buzzer sounds.
32	7	"Give Up"; Transliteration: "Akiramero" (Japanese: あきらめろ)	November 17, 2013
Startled by the buzzer, Kagami and Midorima fumble the ball which misses the hoop. The tournament regulations prohibit overtime, so the match ends in a draw. Meanwhile, Kirisaki Daiichi wins 108–70 against Senshinkan. Hyuga has realized that Kiyoshi is still injured and asks him to sit out the Kirisaki Daiichi match. Kiyoshi is determined to play even if it wrecks his knees. Kiyoshi challenges Hyuga to a one-on-one, which the latter lost.
33	8	"We're the Seirin High School Basketball Team!"; Transliteration: "Seirin Koukou Basuke-bu da!" (Japanese: 誠凜高校バスケ部だ!)	November 24, 2013
The newly-formed basketball team shout from the rooftops before morning assembly that they will participate in the national tournament to become the best team in Japan. Hyuga shows up and adds that if they do not do so, he will confess his feelings buck-naked. Riko is impressed and agrees to coach them. Although Kiyoshi was the founder, he trusts Hyuga to be captain. Seirin get to the finals of the preliminaries and face Kirisaki Dai Ichi. With less than four minutes left in the game, Kiyoshi's leg starts acting up. Makoto Hanamiya enters and maneuvers his team to injure Kiyoshi as punishment for the 84–83 victory for Seirin. and the team visit Kiyoshi in hospital. He lies and claims it is just a sprain, but Hyuga confronts him later and Kiyoshi admits that with rehabilitation and surgery his knee will heal by the time he finishes high-school. Even if Kiyoshi skips the surgery it will still be a year before he returns, and he will keep accumulating damage as he plays basketball and will only be able to play for a year at most. Hyuga vows that they will become the best team in Japan next year. Without Kiyoshi, Seirin were eliminated from the championship league by the three kings.
34	9	"I'll Defeat You!!"; Transliteration: "Kanarazu Taosu!" (Japanese: 必ず倒す!)	December 1, 2013
The match between Seirin and Kirisaki Daiichi begins. Having heard Kiyoshi's story, the first years are determined to support their seniors. Kuroko uses his Vanishing Drive early in the game and Kiyoshi scores the first goal. Kirisaki Dai Ichi get away with rough and dirty moves in the referee's blind spots. Kuroko prevents Kagami from punching one of the players in anger. Seeing the injuries of his teammates, Kiyoshi decides to take the brunt of the rough play by handling the offense and defense of the inside of the court. He tells Kiyoshi that if she subs him out now, he will hate her for the rest of his life. Hyuga is determined to take some of the pressure off Kiyoshi by scoring from the outside, but keeps missing. Kagami also attempts to score but gets a foul. Kiyoshi pep talks the team, and they calm down a little. Hanamiya again taunts Kiyoshi who doesn't react. This caused Hanamiya, who signals his team to injure Kiyoshi and Kiyoshi gets an elbow to the face, to get angry. However, Hinamiya eventually gets up again, saying that he has vowed to destroy Seirin.
35	10	"It's Trust"; Transliteration: "Shinrai da" (Japanese: 信頼だ)	December 8, 2013
The second quarter ends with Seirin in the 45–40 lead. Kuroko asks Hanamiya why he plays in such an underhanded way and Hanamiya responds that he enjoys seeing the pain and frustration of hardworking players. Aomine confronts Hanamiya in the bathroom and says he is going to lose the match because he has made Kuroko angry. A member of Kirisaki Dai Ichi believes the secret of Kuroko's vanishing drive is blinking, intentionally blinks out of time at the start of the third quarter, but Kuroko still passes him and Kagami scores. Shortly afterwards, Kuroko is subbed out to conserve his energy and Hanamiya subs in Kentaro Seto. Izuki's eagle eye is thwarted by Hanamiya and Seto. Seirin does not make further goals, the third quarter ending with Kirisaki Dai Ichi leading 47–58. Kuroko suggests they can break ahead if Kuroko stops playing with the team. Fourth quarter begins and Kuroko intercepts his own team's passes before Hanamiya can. With Kirisaki Dai Ichi still in the 54–60 lead – and less than six minutes left in the match – Riko sees Kiyoshi get further injured and calls a time out, subbing Kiyoshi out of the game. The rest of the team are determined to win for Kiyoshi.
36	11	"Don't be Ridiculous"; Transliteration: "Fuzakeruna" (Japanese: ふざけるな)	December 15, 2013
Hyuga continues to miss his shots, until the ball goes out of court and Kiyoshi retrieves it. Hyuga remembers his promise to Kiyoshi to become the best in Japan, and realizes they have never given a high five. Hyuga calms down and shoots three times while Izuki also calms down and scores. Hanamiya attempts to elbow Kuroko, who dodges. Hanamiya shows that dirty tactics is not all he can do by passing Kuroko, and scoring with a "teardrop" shot. With 45 seconds left, Kirisaki Dai Ichi is barely in the 69–70 lead. Kuroko uses his ignite pass to Kagami who scores with a dunk. Seirin maintain control of the ball, and Hyuga scores the final three before the buzzer sounds. Seirin wins 78–70, qualifying for the Winter Cup. Hyuga gives Kiyoshi a hi-five. Hanamiya vows vengeance, but Kiyoshi is unfazed. Meanwhile Shutoku wins 112–81 against Senshinkan while qualifying for the Winter Cup as well. This means that all members of the Generation of Miracles will be participating.
37	12	"Thanks"; Transliteration: "Yoroshuu Tanomu wa" (Japanese: よろしゅうたのむわ)	December 22, 2013
After winning against Kirisaki Daiichi and confirming their spot in the Winter Cup, the Seirin team head to a hot spring to regenerate their energy. They are surprised when the Touou Academy team joins them at the resort. The Touou team explains that they have defeated Josei High, who Seirin had also played in the Winter Cup preliminary rounds by the score of 170–39. Touou also revealed that they will be Seirin's opponent in the first round of the Winter Cup. Kagami goes missing next morning, but Riko is not worried. Seirin's training camp starts immediately and without Kagami. Riko's father, Kagetora, promises to develop the team's individual skills and get themselves prepared for the Winter Cup. Meanwhile, Kagami is shown to be returning to America for his training.
38	13	"Definitely This Time"; Transliteration: "Kondo wa Mou Zettai ni" (Japanese: 今度はもう絶対に)	January 5, 2014
Kagetora claims that the second year students of Seirin can improve their individual skills in less than one month, but does not know what to teach Kuroko when he is asked about him. Kagetora even said that Kuroko might face a wall. Kagami did not appear in the opening of the Winter Cup, as he apparently had forgotten about the time difference between California and Japan. Kuroko was summoned by Akashi Seijuro, the captain of the Generation of Miracles. Kagami interrupts a seemingly normal conversation of the Generation of Miracles and meets Akashi for the first time. Things took a sinister turn when Akashi borrows scissors from Midorima and almost stabs Kagami in the cheek. The match between Seirin and Touou begins with an intense competition for the first point.
39	14	"Useless Effort"; Transliteration: "Mudana Doryokuda" (Japanese: ムダな努力だ)	January 12, 2014
Seirin gets itsfirst points through Kuroko's Ignite Pass Kai, an improved version of his Ignite Pass, powerful that it even goes past Aomine's hand, followed by Kiyoshi's Right Of Postponement to provide a lob for Kagami to slam. As Touou gets more points and are not affected by the Ignite Pass Kai, Hyuga volunteers to start his attack on the outside. The freshmen are confused as to why Hyuga is relaxed, and the senior players reveal that it is because he is confident, shown by him cracking his neck. At the start of the second half, Kuroko attempts to break past Aomine with Vanishing Drive, but Aomine closes his eyes and relies on his past relationship with Kuroko to quickly stop Kuroko from passing him. Kuroko tries another Ignite Pass Kai through Aomine, but the latter stops it with one hand. Upon seeing this bad situation, Kuroko gets subbed out.
40	15	"I Think He's Extremely Happy"; Transliteration: "Ureshikute Shoganai to Omoimasu" (Japanese: 嬉しくてしょうがないと思います)	January 19, 2014
Kagami has been serious to try to raise Kuroko's spirits since timeout is over. Kuroko uses his Ignite Pass to Hyuga, who manages to catch it and throw a three-pointer, which by doing so taking the lead. However, Imayoshi fakes to pass for Wakamatsu to score. In the next possession, a change that leads to the surprise of many has been done: Imayoshi taking over to mark Kuroko by direction of Momoi.
41	16	"We Win Now!"; Transliteration: "Ima Katsun'nda!" (Japanese: 今勝つんだ！)	January 26, 2014
Imayoshi can immobilize Kuroko, and Sakurai manages to stop Hyuga's Barrier Jumper, both actions being instructed by Momoi. Aomine goes past Kagami and makes a 360 spin dunk at the same time. All five Touou players can see Kuroko, which leads to a trap he set when Izuki goes past Imayoshi with a Vanishing Drive. Hyuga also managed to bypass Sakurai with a Vanishing Drive and scored. The revelation of Misdirection Overflow has pulled Seirin to within single digit difference. However, Imayoshi scores a buzzer-beating three-pointer to put Touou's lead to 11, ending the third quarter. Before timeout expires, Aomine did not pay attention as the rest of the players return to the court. The fourth quarter starts with Hyuga combining his Barrier Jumper and Kuroko's Misdirection Overflow to avoid Sakurai's quick defense and scores a three-pointer, putting the difference back to 8.
42	17	"I Believe in Him"; Transliteration: "Shinjitemasukara" (Japanese: 信じてますから)	February 2, 2014
Hyuga his three with confidence, even with Sakurai's tight defense on the former. Touou goes to inbound, but are pressed by Seirin, and eventually Wakamatsu's inbound pass to Suso has been stolen by Kuroko and Hyuga tries to hit another three, but Sakurai fouls Hyuga and gets three free throws. All three are converted and Seirin are now only down by three points. In the next possession for Touou, Aomine slowly goes past Kagami and the latter cannot even react at all. Aomine has entered the Zone, therefore his speed has doubled, and now Seirin are unable to stop Aomine. In the timeout, Kagami wants to go for a one-on-one against Aomine, which is virtually impossible with the latter in the Zone. Kagami has two minutes as Seirin's ace, and for the next few Touou possessions, Aomine still manages to pass Kagami and score. Down by thirteen, and not bearing to see Seirin lose and cry again, Kagami finally reacts to Aomine's drive, hitting the ball out of bounds.
43	18	"Like I'd Lose"; Transliteration: "Makeru ka yo" (Japanese: 負けるかよ)	February 9, 2014
An intense battle between the Aces, Aomine and Kagami, begins. Each refuses to give in to the other and manages to block the other's shot attempts. The audience, as well as the other players, are amazed at the battle of the Aces in the Zone, which brings their focus and reaction speed to the maximum. At the end of the match, the third-year players of Touou retire, and Wakamatsu is made the new team captain. Aomine, outside of the stadium, regains his desire to practice and train again, and asks Momoi to go shopping for new basketball shoes with him, to which she reacts with surprise and happiness, agreeing to his request and returning to calling him "Dai-chan", as she had done in their middle school days.
44	19	"Tell Me"; Transliteration: "Oshietekudasai" (Japanese: 教えてください)	February 16, 2014
Upon a tough and close victory against Touou, the Seirin team decides to find a place to rest and rejuvenate. Without places to go due to various reasons, Kagami offers the team an invitation to his house. After a restful night for the team, they find Alexandra "Alex" Garcia, Kagami's basketball master, sleeping in Kagami's house. The Seirin team – along with Alex – went to watch the Winter Cup match between Onita and Shutoku, with the latter taking the win easily, and Midorima caught Alex's attention. After the match, the Seirin team goes to review their next opponent, Nakamiya South, while Alex brings Kagami to teach him something she didn not teach. The match between Seirin and Nakamiya South is about to begin. Seirin decides to bench Kuroko and Kagami, with the starting line-up entirely made of second year players.
45	20	"Of Course It's Not Easy"; Transliteration: "Karuimono na Hazunai Darō" (Japanese: 軽いものなはずないだろう)	February 23, 2014
As the match between Seirin and Nakamiya South progresses, at Touou Academy's library, Imayoshi and Susa discussed about Seirin's possibility of winning the match while studying. Trying to attack again, Kuroko changes the intended pass course to an open Kagami, who attempts to shoot, but gets blocked by the quick Murasakibara.
46	21	"First Score!!"; Transliteration: "Hatsutokuten!!" (Japanese: 初得点！！)	March 2, 2014
Yosen takes an 18–0 lead going towards the end of the first quarter. As Fukui goes to score the last basket of the quarter, Kagami touched the ball, hence it missed. Start of 2nd quarter, and Kiyoshi tries for a post play against Murasakibara, then Kiyoshi throws up a lob for Kagami to slam, attempting for the first points for Seirin. However, Murasakibara has great reflexes that he reacted in time to block Kagami's dunk. Match progresses on but Kagami is having difficulties defeating Okamura.
47	22	"No Question"; Transliteration: "Kimatterā" (Japanese: 決まってらぁ)	March 9, 2014
Himuro executes a superb fake on Kagami, then smoothly transitions to take a jump shot, to which Kagami and Hyuga cannot react. When Seirin is down by 5, they struggle to stop Murasakibara.
48	23	"I Don't Want to Lose!"; Transliteration: "Maketakunai!" (Japanese: 負けたくない！)	March 16, 2014
With Murasakibara finally appearing on the offensive side, Seirin is slowly losing hope of having the chance to win against Yosen. With the help of the Fukui, Murasakibara catches the ball and dunks it, causing the hoop to break and collide with the ground, further diminishing the hopes of Seirin. Back to the game, Kuroko marks Murasakibara, thus causing Murasakibara to foul for charging at Kuroko, effectively angering Murasakibara. During the break, at Seirin's bench, Kiyoshi says he is glad to be with Seirin, making the rest of the team pissed because he had not noticed this earlier. Kiyoshi believes in the saying that "We don't support each other because we are a team. We are a team because we support each other".
49	24	"Enough"; Transliteration: "Mō ī ya" (Japanese: もういいや)	March 23, 2014
As the match continues in the fourth quarter, Yosen keeps on maintaining its lead and with Kiyoshi out, the Seirin players face tough times scoring any points. Seirin starts to use the same full court 2–3 man-to-man defense like what Yosen uses, but Himuro and Murasakibara can overcome it easily. During the timeout, Murasakibara said that he does not want to play even though they are still four points ahead, but Himuro can convince him back into playing.
50	25	"Win!"; Transliteration: "Katsu!" (Japanese: 勝つ!)	March 30, 2014
Back to the match after the timeout, Okamura provides a screen for Himuro, as the latter goes on for a Mirage Shot when the Zone-possessed Kagami tries to block it again. However, Himuro passes to Murasakibara, who quickly turns and goes for a dunk, but Kagami moves very fast that he is able to try to block Murasakibara. Kagami realizes what was wrong when he asked Kuroko to throw away the ring that represents his friendship with Himuro. Kuroko tells him that it is possible to stay as brothers and enemies at the same time, and Kagami grabs the ring and finds Himuro.
