= Gintama (TV series) =

Japanese anime television series

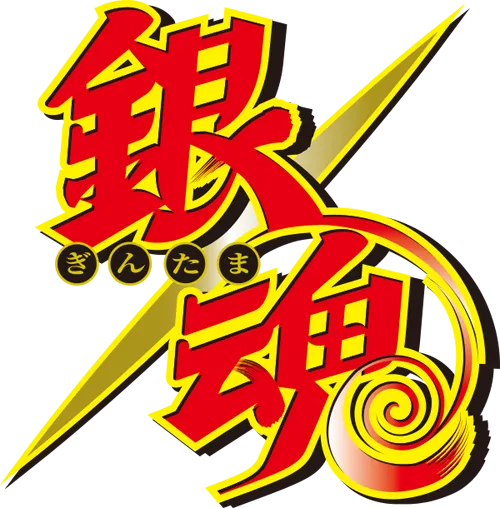

銀魂
- Genre: Adventure; Samurai; Science fiction comedy
- Anime television series
- Directed by: Shinji Takamatsu (1–105); Yōichi Fujita (100–201)
- Produced by: Noriko Kobayashi (1–13); Daiji Mutō (1–112); Ryūta Wakanabe (1–150); Fukashi Azuma (14–201); Naoki Sasada (113–201); Hiromitsu Higuchi (151–201)
- Written by: Akatsuki Yamatoya
- Music by: Audio Highs
- Studio: Sunrise
- Licensed by: NA: Sentai Filmworks (1–49); Crunchyroll (51–201); SEA: Medialink
- Original network: TXN (TV Tokyo)
- English network: SEA: Animax Asia; US: Shorts HD
- Original run: April 4, 2006 – March 25, 2010
- Episodes: 201
- Anime television series

Gintama' (Note: Subtitled as Enchōsen from episodes 52 to 64.)
- Directed by: Yōichi Fujita
- Produced by: Hiromitsu Higuchi; Shinjirō Yokoyama; Fukashi Azuma (1–13); Shinnosuke Wada (14–64)
- Written by: Akatsuki Yamatoya
- Music by: Audio Highs
- Studio: Sunrise
- Licensed by: NA: Crunchyroll; SEA: Medialink
- Original network: TXN (TV Tokyo)
- Original run: April 4, 2011 – March 28, 2013
- Episodes: 64
- Anime television series

Gintama°
- Directed by: Chizuru Miyawaki
- Produced by: Susumu Matsuyama; Susumu Miura; Tomoyuki Saitō
- Music by: Audio Highs
- Studio: BN Pictures
- Licensed by: NA: Crunchyroll; SEA: Medialink
- Original network: TXN (TV Tokyo)
- Original run: April 8, 2015 – March 30, 2016
- Episodes: 51
- Original video animation

Gintama: Love Potion Arc
- Directed by: Chizuru Miyawaki
- Produced by: Hiromitsu Higuchi; Susumu Matsuyama; Yū Honda
- Music by: Audio Highs
- Studio: BN Pictures
- Released: August 4, 2016 – November 4, 2016
- Episodes: 2
- Anime television series

Gintama. (Note: Subtitled as Porori-hen from episodes 13 to 25 and as Shirogane no Tamashii-hen from episodes 26 to 51.)
- Directed by: Chizuru Miyawaki
- Produced by: Hiromitsu Higuchi; Susumu Matsuyama
- Music by: Audio Highs
- Studio: BN Pictures
- Licensed by: NA: Crunchyroll; SEA: Medialink
- Original network: TXN (TV Tokyo)
- Original run: January 9, 2017 – October 8, 2018
- Episodes: 51
- Original net animation

Gintama: The Semi-Final
- Directed by: Chizuru Miyawaki
- Written by: Taku Kishimoto
- Music by: Audio Highs
- Studio: BN Pictures
- Released: January 15, 2021 – January 20, 2021
- Episodes: 2
- Films
- Gintama: The Movie (2010); Gintama: The Movie: The Final Chapter: Be Forever Yorozuya (2013); Gintama: The Very Final (2021)
- Related
- Gintama: Mr. Ginpachi's Zany Class (2025)
- icon

Gintama (銀魂; lit. 'Silver Soul') is a Japanese anime television series based on Hideaki Sorachi's manga series Gintama. Produced by Sunrise, the series aired for 201 episodes on TV Tokyo and its affiliates from April 4, 2006, to March 25, 2010. A second 64-episode series, titled Gintama', aired from April 4, 2011, to March 28, 2013. A third 51-episode series, produced by BN Pictures, titled Gintama°, aired from April 8, 2015, to March 30, 2016. A fourth and final 51-episode series, titled Gintama., aired from October 9, 2017, to October 8, 2018. Three films have been released: Gintama: The Movie (2010), Gintama: The Movie: The Final Chapter: Be Forever Yorozuya (2013), and Gintama: The Very Final (2021); the last one continues and concludes the events of the television series.

== Plot ==
The story is set in an alternate-history late-Edo period, where humanity is attacked by aliens called "Amanto" (天人; 'Sky People'). Edo Japan's samurai fight to defend Earth, but the shogun cowardly surrenders when he realizes the aliens' power. He agrees to an unequal contract with the aliens, ceding power to them, and also places a ban on carrying swords in public and allows the invaders to enter the country. The samurai's swords are confiscated and the Tokugawa bakufu (shogunate) becomes a puppet government.

The series focuses on an eccentric samurai, Gintoki Sakata who works as an odd-jobs freelancer. He helps a teenager named Shinpachi Shimura save his sister Tae from an Amanto group that wants to send her to a brothel. Impressed by Gintoki, Shinpachi becomes his freelance apprentice to pay the bills and learn more about the enigmatic samurai. When the pair rescues a teenage alien girl with super-strength, Kagura, from a yakuza group, they accept her into their odd-jobs freelancing business, and the three become known as "Yorozuya" (万事屋; 'Store of 10,000 business' or 'We do everything').

While working, they regularly encounter the Shinsengumi police force, who often ally with Gintoki when work involves dangerous criminals. The trio also meets Gintoki's former comrades from the Amanto invasion, including the revolutionary Kotaro Katsura who is friendly toward them despite his terrorist activities against the alien-controlled government.

The story is a balance between episodic and shorter arc based plotlines that resolve quickly, and a rich background plot that develops from its beginning to end. For example, Gintoki's former comrade Shinsuke Takasugi is a major antagonist who regards Gintoki and his other former comrades as enemies and seeks to destroy the shogunate. Over time, Takasugi gains allies, including Kagura's brother Kamui, and the elite fighting unit Mimawarigumi to prepare for his large-scale coup d'état. After the true antagonist—the immortal Utsuro—is introduced, Gintoki works with both friends and enemies to stop Utsuro from destroying the Earth.

== Cast ==
Character	Japanese voice actor	English voice actor (Gintama)	English voice actor (Gintama°)
Gintoki Sakata	Tomokazu Sugita	Roly Gutierrez	Michael Daingerfield
Shinpaichi Shimura	Daisuke Sakaguchi	Clay Cartland	Cole Howard
Kagura	Rie Kugimiya	Crystal Lopez	Jocelyne Loewen
Sadaharu	Mikako Takahashi	Not dubbed	Not dubbed
Narrator	Fumihiko Tachiki	Wayne LaGette	

== Production and release ==
=== 2006–2010 series ===
The first 201 anime television series aired on TV Tokyo from April 4, 2006, to March 25, 2010. The first 99 episodes were initially directed by Shinji Takamatsu. Episodes 100 to 105 were directed by Takamatsu and Yoichi Fujita, while the following episodes were directed solely by Fujita.

Aniplex released the series in DVD format. Episodes 1–49 were collected in twelve DVDs, released from July 26, 2006, to June 26, 2007. Episodes 50–99 were collected in thirteen DVDs, released from July 25, 2007, to July 23, 2008. Episodes 100–150 were collected in thirteen DVDs, released from August 27, 2008, to August 26, 2009. Episodes 151–201 were collected in thirteen DVDs, released from October 28, 2009, to October 27, 2010.

In November 2008, an agreement was reached between TV Tokyo and the streaming video service Crunchyroll for the latter to stream English-subtitled episodes for free one week after they had aired in Japan; paid subscribers could watch new episodes an hour after they aired in Japan. On January 8, 2009, Crunchyroll uploaded their first episode (episode 129) to the service. Alongside new episodes each week, Crunchyroll also uploaded episodes from the beginning of the series. It was licensed in North America by Sentai Filmworks, with distribution from Section23 Films. The first collection containing thirteen English-subtitled episodes was released on DVD, April 27, 2010. Only 49 episodes were released before the releases stalled. However, shortly after licensing the Gintama film, Sentai Filmworks announced that based on the film's performance, they would consider releasing more of the series in North America, possibly with an English dub. An English subtitled version of the series began airing in the United States on Shorts HD on July 12, 2015. On July 1, 2016, Crunchyroll announced that they would re-release the series on Blu-ray and DVD with an English dub. Hulu began streaming an English dub for the first season on December 1, 2019; an English dub for the second and third season were released in October 2025. In Southeast Asia, the series premiered on Animax Asia on August 26, 2022.

==== Yorinuki Gintama-san ====
On April 5, 2010, TV Tokyo stations began airing high-definition reruns of older Gintama episodes, under the title Yorinuki Gintama-san (よりぬき銀魂さん; lit. 'The Very Best of Gintama'). In addition to being broadcast in HD, new opening and ending themes were made. The opening and ending themes for episodes 1–9 are "Bakuchi Dancer" (バクチ・ダンサー, Bakuchi Dansā; lit. 'Fullspeed Dancer') and "Bokutachi no Kisetsu" (僕たちの季節; lit. 'Our Season'), respectively, both performed Does. From episodes 10–26, the opening theme is "Kaze no Gotoku" (風のごとく; lit. 'Like the Wind') by Joe Inoue and the ending theme is "Wave" by Vijandeux. From episode 27–39, the opening theme is "Kanōsei Girl" (可能性ガール, Kanōsei Gāru; 'Probable Girl') by Chiaki Kuriyama and the ending is "In My Life" by Azu. From episodes 40–51, the opening is "Karto Niago" (カートニアゴ, Kāto Niago) by Flip and the ending is "Sakurane" (桜音; 'Sakura Sound') by Piko.

=== Gintama' ===
In March 2010, Fujita hinted that the anime would continue once the staff had enough material to adapt. Shinji Takamatsu said that the TV series "is absolutely not over. It hasn't even begun yet! It will definitely return." In December 2010, Shueisha stated that the Gintama anime would resume in April 2011. Gintama' (銀魂'), the sequel to the original Gintama anime, aired for 51 episodes (episodes 202–252 of the overall series) on TV Tokyo from April 4, 2011, to March 26, 2012. The main staff from the first series returned, with Fujita again serving as director. The episode released on September 26, 2011, features a crossover with the Sket Dance series. Aniplex collected the episodes in thirteen DVDs, released from July 27, 2011, to July 25, 2012.

A second part, Gintama': Enchōsen (銀魂' 延長戦), aired for 13 episodes (episodes 253–265 of the overall series) on TV Tokyo from October 4, 2012, to March 28, 2013. The main staff once again returned, with Fujita as director. Aniplex collected the episodes in four DVDs, released from December 19, 2012, to May 22, 2013.

The series was streamed by Crunchyroll.

=== Gintama° ===
On December 21, 2014, during Jump Festa's super stage event, it was announced that a new Gintama series was being produced. Titled Gintama° (銀魂°) and animated by BN Pictures, the 51 episodes (episodes 266–316 of the overall series) aired on TV Tokyo and its affiliates from April 8, 2015, to March 30, 2016. Aniplex collected the episodes in thirteen DVD and Blu-ray Disc sets, released from July 22, 2015, to July 27, 2016.

Crunchyroll began streaming an English dub of the first 12 episodes of the series on February 1, 2017. 12 additional episodes were released weekly.

=== Gintama. ===
A fourth Gintama series was announced in September 2016. Titled Gintama. (銀魂.), it aired for 12 episodes (episodes 317–328 of the overall series) from January 9 to March 27, 2017, on TV Tokyo and its affiliates. (Note: TV Tokyo listed its air dates on Sunday at 25:35, which is effectively Monday at 1:35 JST.) The staff from the Gintama° anime series returned to reprise their roles. Aniplex collected the episodes in four DVD and Blu-ray Disc sets, released from April 26 to July 26, 2017.

A second cours, adapting the skipped comedic arcs taking place before the events of the Shogun Assassination arc, titled Gintama. Porori-hen (銀魂。ポロリ編), aired for 13 episodes (episodes 329–341 of the overall series) from October 2 to December 25, 2017. (Note: TV Tokyo listed its air dates on Sunday at 25:35, which is effectively Monday at 1:35 JST.) Aniplex collected the episodes in five DVD and Blu-ray Disc sets, released from January 24 to May 30, 2018.

The final story arc of the manga was adapted into a 26-episode twin-cours, titled Gintama. Shirogane no Tamashii-hen (銀魂. 銀ノ魂篇, Gintama Shirogane no Tamashii-hen; 'Gintama: Silver Soul Arc'), with its first 12 episodes (episodes 342–353 of the overall series) aired from January 8 to March 26, 2018. (Note: TV Tokyo listed its air dates on Sunday at 25:35, which is effectively Monday at 1:35 JST.) The second 14-episode part (episodes 354–367 of the overall series) aired from July 9 to October 8, 2018. (Note: TV Tokyo listed its air dates on Sunday at 25:35, which is effectively Monday at 1:35 JST.) Aniplex collected its episodes in nine DVD and Blu-ray Disc sets, released from June 27, 2018, to February 27, 2019.

Crunchyroll streamed the series.

=== Films ===
Gintama: The Movie, known in Japan as Gintama: Shinyaku Benizakura-Hen (銀魂 新訳紅桜篇; lit. 'Gintama: A New Retelling Benizakura Arc'), a retelling of the Benizakura arc of the manga, premiered in Japan on April 4, 2010.

A second film Gintama: The Movie: The Final Chapter: Be Forever Yorozuya (劇場版 銀魂 完結篇 万事屋よ永遠なれ, Gekijōban Gintama Kanketsu-hen: Yorozuya yo Eien Nare), with a script written by Sorachi, premiered in Japan on July 6, 2013.

A third film, Gintama: The Very Final, known in Japan as Gintama: The Final (銀魂 THE FINAL), premiered on January 8, 2021. It adapts the finale of the original manga, combined with new story elements. It was preceded by an anime special Gintama: The Semi-Final (銀魂 THE SEMI-FINAL), tied into the film, which premiered on January 15, 2021, on the dTV online service, with the second episode released on January 20.

A fourth film, Gintama: The Movie 2026: Yoshiwara in Flames (新劇場版 銀魂 -吉原大炎上-, Shin Gekijō-ban Gintama Yoshiwara dai Enjō), reanimating the Yoshiwara in Flames story arc (episodes 139–146), premiered on February 13, 2026. It premiered on Netflix on August 27, 2026.

=== Compilation films ===
Three compilation films, featuring scenes not included during the television broadcast, were released in 2023 and 2024 as part of the "Gintama 20th Anniversary Project", with a limited three-week screening in Japan. The first film, titled Gintama on Theater 2D: Baragaki-hen (銀魂オンシアター2D バラガキ篇, Gintama on Shiatā 2D Baragaki-hen; lit. 'Gintama on Theater 2D: Thorny Arc'), premiered on November 10, 2023. It encompasses episodes 244–247 of the anime series (Gintama'). The second film, Gintama on Theater 2D: Ikkoku Keisei-hen (銀魂オンシアター2D 一国傾城篇, Gintama on Shiatā 2D Ikkoku Keisei-hen; lit. 'Gintama on Theater 2D: Courtesan of the Nation Arc'), premiered on June 21, 2024. It encompasses episodes 257–261 of the anime series (Gintama': Enchōsen). The third film, Gintama on Theater 2D: Kintama-hen (銀魂オンシアター2D 金魂篇, Gintama on Shiatā 2D Kintama-hen; lit. 'Gintama on Theater 2D: Kintama Arc'), premiered on November 22, 2024. It encompasses episodes 253–256 of the anime series (Gintama': Enchōsen).

=== Original animation DVDs ===
The 65th and 66th volumes of the manga were bundled with an original animation DVD (OAD) each; the volumes were released on August 4 and November 4, 2016, respectively. Both OADs adapt the manga's Love Potion story arc.

== Reception ==
Gintama appeared multiple times on Japanese television rankings, with its first two episodes receiving a rating of 5.6. The series' DVD sales also frequently appeared on Japanese anime DVD rankings, and the third DVD of season three placed ninth on Japanese Amazon.com's 2008 top ten best-selling DVD list. In August 2008, TV Tokyo stated that Gintama and Naruto had "contributed to robust sales of overseas rights in the last fiscal year which ended in March." In a poll conducted by Puff magazine, Gintama won the "Best Animation" category. The DVD of the Gintama OVAs became the best-selling OVA in Japan in 2009, with 61,226 units sold within two weeks of its release. According to Oricon's "2009's Top-Selling DVDs in Japan" survey, the same DVD topped the Animation/Special Effects DVDs category, having sold 76,000 units in total. The CD soundtrack Gintama The Best received the Animation Album of the Yea award from the Japanese magazine DVD Navigator, published by Kinema Junpo.

Gintama received both positive and mixed responses. Although reviewers noted that the humor improved after the series' introduction, some jokes were difficult to understand due to their roots in Japanese culture and references to other series. The DVD release notes were criticized for lacking explanations of culturally specific jokes. Critics also stated that the quality of the humor was inconsistent across the first episodes, with some scenes being so esoteric that some viewers might have abandoned the series. The series' quality was found to improve as it continued, making viewers less intimidated by its large number of episodes. The characters were praised for their awareness of their tendency to "break the fourth wall", while the female characters were found appealing based on their unconventional traits. The series was noted for its ability to shift between comedy and drama without a loss of quality.

=== Controversy ===
Episode 232 featured a negative portrayal of a character parodying the then-Minister for Government Revitalisation, Renhō Murata, which led to the cancellation of the episode's rerun on AT-X. Series supervisor Shinji Takamatsu explained that TV Tokyo had canceled the rerun on its own initiative. Renhō's representative denied having objected to the episode, although a report from the newspaper Mainichi Shimbun stated that the affected party had contacted TV Tokyo. After the story arc that included the episode was completed, Takamatsu voiced his concerns about including the episode on home video.
