= Gintama: The Very Final =

2021 anime film

- Theatrical release poster
- Directed by: Chizuru Miyawaki
- Screenplay by: Chizuru Miyawaki
- Story by: Hideaki Sorachi (Note: Story (ストーリー))
- Based on: Gintama by Hideaki Sorachi
- Produced by: Kazumasa Sanjouba; Takashi Maekawa
- Starring: Tomokazu Sugita; Daisuke Sakaguchi; Rie Kugimiya; Akira Ishida; Takehito Koyasu; Susumu Chiba; Kazuya Nakai; Kenichi Suzumura; Kōichi Yamadera
- Cinematography: Yuuki Teramoto
- Edited by: Akane Shiraishi; Takeshi Seyama
- Music by: Audio Highs
- Production company: BN Pictures
- Distributed by: Warner Bros. Pictures
- Release date: January 8, 2021 (Japan)
- Running time: 104 minutes
- Country: Japan
- Language: Japanese
- Box office: $17,252,960

Gintama: The Very Final, known in Japan as Gintama: The Final (銀魂 THE FINAL, Gintama Za Fainaru), is a 2021 Japanese animated action comedy drama film produced by BN Pictures. Based on the Gintama manga and anime series, the film acts as a conclusion to the anime series storyline. It was directed by the director from the anime series Chizuru Miyawaki and based on a story by Hideaki Sorachi, Gin Tama's original author. It stars Tomokazu Sugita, Daisuke Sakaguchi, Rie Kugimiya among others. The film was released on January 8, 2021.

An anime special Gintama: The Semi-Final, tied into the film, premiered on January 15, 2021, on dTV online service, with the second episode released on January 20. This bridges the gap between the end of the TV anime and the movie.

== Plot ==
Gintoki, Takasugi and Katsura fight past the Tendoushuu forces, who have taken over the Terminal. The mothership at the top of the terminal is absorbing large amounts of Altana and channeling it into the body of the child Shouyou in order to resurrect him and obtain true immortality. As the group is attacked, they split up into two, with Katsura holding on to Shouyou's heart. Katsura and Hitsugi engage in a fierce battle, and the latter eventually stabs and destroys the heart, revealing that he had no intention of reviving the child; he only wanted to free Utsuro from the curse of immortality. Without the heart, Shouyou would only be able to regenerate and maintain his body temporarily. In the terminal, the Shinsengumi, Hyakka, Oniwabanshu and the rest of the Kabukicho residents fight the rest of the Tendoushuu army, while Matsudaira shoots down the ships outside.

Then Gintoki reunites with Kagura and Shinpachi and they rush towards the top of the terminal. In the meantime, Takasugi reaches the Tendoushuu's ship to find that Shouyou has been revived and killed off the rest of the Tendoushuu. Shouyou's only wish is to put an end to himself and Utsuro. Takasugi begs Shouyou to return to Shoka Sonjuku with him. Shouyou apologizes for not being able to save his disciples, the ones that he truly wanted to protect. As he approaches Takasugi, the latter stabs him, revealing that Utsuro's blood has taken over his body as well. This causes a large explosion at the top of the Terminal. Gintoki is separated from the others and faces off Utsuro, now manifesting in Takasugi's body, Utsuro comes to a realisation that Takasugi did not stab Utsuro earlier. Instead, supported by Oboro whose blood also runs through his body, Takasugi stabbed himself. The body that Utsuro saw lying on the ground was himself. Gintoki and Utsuro fight each other.

With a final stab and in a human body, Utsuro is no longer immortal and dies. Gintoki holds a dying Takasugi in his arms, who tells him that Gintoki has won again and he dies. Shinpachi and Kagura rescue the wounded Shouyou. Shouyou tells everyone to evacuate the Terminal via Sakamoto's ships, who was about to blow up due to the massive amounts of Altana that is escaping it. Shouyou said that he could use the Altana in his body to cancel out the energy bursting out of the Terminal. Shinpachi and Kagura join him and Katsura stays behind as well. He tells Gintoki, via a radio handed to him by the Shinsengumi, that he has spent his childhood covering up for Gintoki and Takasugi whenever they made mischief, and he couldn't leave until he did that again. As Shouyou disappears, Gintoki tells him that he wanted to show his teacher what he has been doing since then – running the Yorozuya with his friends.

Some time in the future, Tama wakes up with memories of what has happened given to her by Tamako. She walks around the city, which has now transformed into Tokyo. After the final battle, Gintoki returned to the Yorozuya. Much of their old friends have remained the same and Tama watches as they celebrate at Snack Smile. Sakamoto writes to Gintoki and informs him that Katsura met up with the remnants of the Kiheitai. Matako scoured the land for Altana gates and found a baby that has emerged from one of the holes. Tama runs to the location where the Yorozuya used to be, only to find the spot empty and the surroundings replaced by futuristic buildings. However, she spots Hasegawa who tells her that machines has taken over the world and humans are mostly unemployed like him. Suddenly, the Yorozuya kick him in the face and reveal that this was a sham ending. Tamako had been fed false memories by Hasegawa and the illusion around them promptly shatters as a result. The Yorozuya is still around and Gintoki tells her to wipe her tears away. Gintoki, Shinpachi and Kagura rush off to an urgent job, but have apparently forgotten what the task was supposed to be. But whatever it is, they would get it done – after all, they are the Yorozuya.

In the final edition of Ginpachi-sensei, Sorachi Hideaki makes a cameo to answer unresolved questions, including if Gintoki is half-Amanto due to his silver hair (no, it is just a manga) and if the baby was really Takasugi (they take a vote but did not come to a conclusion).

== Cast ==
Character	Japanese	English
Gintoki Sakata	Tomokazu Sugita	Michael Daingerfield
Shinpachi Shimura	Daisuke Sakaguchi	Cole Howard
Kagura	Rie Kugimiya	Jocelyne Loewen
Kotaro Katsura	Akira Ishida	Joe Daniels
Shinsuke Takasugi	Takehito Koyasu	Kyle Colby Jones
Isao Kondo	Susumu Chiba	David Wald
Toshiro Hijikata	Kazuya Nakai	Blake Shepard
Sogo Okita	Kenichi Suzumura	Clint Bickham
Shoyo Yoshida / Utsuro	Kōichi Yamadera	Adam Gibbs
Tae Shimura	Satsuki Yukino	Elissa Cuellar
Tsukuyo	Yuuko Kaida	Taylor Fono
Kyubei Yagyu	Fumiko Orikasa	Brittney Karbowski
Ayame Sarutobi	Yuu Kobayashi	Carli Mosier
Nobume Imai	Aya Hirano	Chiara Zanni
Taizo Hasegawa	Fumihiko Tachiki	Andrew Love
Katakuriko Matsudaira	Norio Wakamoto	Ty Mahany
Tatsuma Sakamoto	Shin-ichiro Miki	Jeremy Gee
Hata	Kouichi Sakaguchi	Andrew Love
Tama	Omi Minami	Luci Christian
Tamako	Omi Minami	Cat Thomas
Otose	Kujira	Shelley Calene-Black
Catherine	Yuu Sugimoto	Luci Christian
Umibouzu	Shō Hayami	John Gremillion
Soyo Tokugawa	Ryō Hirohashi	Juliet Simmons
Kamui	Satoshi Hino	Greg Ayres
Abuto	Hōchū Ōtsuka	John Swasey
Henpeita Takechi	Chafurin	George Manley
Matako Kijima	Risa Hayamizu	
Gengai Hiraga	Bin Shimada	
Sagaru Yamazaki	Tetsuharu Ōta	
Zenzo Hattori	Toshiyuki Morikawa	
Oboro	Kazuhiko Inoue	Hiro Kanagawa
Hitsugi	Masashi Sugawara	Steve Fenley
Tendoshu Leader	Binbin Takaoka	Chris Rager

== Production ==
The film was announced in August 2019 by the manga's final 77th volume. The film, titled Gintama: The Final, premiered on January 8, 2021. It adapts the finale of the original manga, combined with new story elements. SPYAIR performs the film's theme song "Wadachi" (轍～Wadachi～; lit. 'Tracks'), while DOES performs an insert song. A Demon Slayer: Kimetsu no Yaiba card illustrated by Sorachi, depicting Tanjiro Kamado and the Hashira, were given to the theatergoers in the film's first week of screenings.

An anime special, Gintama: The Semi-Final, which ties into the film, premiered on January 15, 2021, on dTV online service, with the second episode released on January 20. On May 1, it was announced that the Blu-ray release would go on sale on August 4, 2021, with the Gintama: The Semi-Final episodes bundled.

Eleven Arts screened the film in North American theatres, under the title Gintama: The Very Final, in both Japanese with subtitles and dubbed into English from November 21–22, 2021.

== Reception ==
Anime News Network praised the film's gags but lamented how several of the subplots of the series were not properly closed as a result of using many characters. IGN was more positive, comparing the narrative to two other popular shonen manga series Naruto and Jujutsu Kaisen for how Gintoki and his friends deal with the Shoyo and Utsuro in their final fights "distilling a major conflict into a massive good-versus-evil showdown helps it to become interesting even for those who aren't as up to date on the saga as others"- Crunchyroll felt the animation felt more a Dragon Ball film rather than Gintama as a result of Toei working on it but still praised for retaining a humor and style reminiscent of the comedy Konosuba. Yahoo panned the movie for being too difficult to follow unless the audience has knowledge about previous Gintama events and found some jokes did not feel appealing. Nevertheless, he praised fight scenes which would appeal to the fans of samurai series Rurouni Kenshin and Afro Samurai.

Gintama: The Very Final grossed $17,252,960 at the box office.
