= Gintama: The Movie =

- Theatrical release poster
- Directed by: Shinji Takamatsu
- Screenplay by: Akatsuki Yamatoya
- Based on: Gintama by Hideaki Sorachi
- Produced by: Shin Hieda; Fukashi Azuma; Hiromitsu Higuchi
- Starring: Tomokazu Sugita; Daisuke Sakaguchi; Rie Kugimiya; Akira Ishida; Takehito Koyasu; Susumu Chiba; Kazuya Nakai; Kenichi Suzumura; Satoshi Hino; Kōichi Yamadera
- Cinematography: Ei Rouhei
- Edited by: Takeshi Seyama; Megumi Uchida; Rie Matsubara; Hiromi Sasaki; Keiko Kadokawa
- Music by: Audio Highs
- Production company: Sunrise
- Distributed by: Warner Bros. Pictures
- Release date: April 24, 2010
- Running time: 96 minutes
- Country: Japan
- Language: Japanese
- Box office: ¥1.07 billion (Japan)

Gintama: The Movie, known in Japan as Gekijō-ban Gintama Shin'yaku Benizakura-hen (劇場版 銀魂 新訳紅桜篇; lit. 'Gintama: A New Retelling Benizakura Arc'), is a 2010 Japanese animated film produced by Sunrise. The film's plot is a retelling of the Benizakura story arc from Gintama in which Kotaro Katsura is attacked by a member of the army Kiheitai, and the freelancer trio Odd Jobs Gin start searching for him.

== Plot ==
One night at a bridge, the Joi terrorist Kotaro Katsura is attacked by a ronin. Katsura's comrade, Elizabeth, goes to the freelancer trio Yorozuya requesting for their help in finding Katsura. While Shinpachi Shimura and Kagura go to search for Katsura, Gintoki Sakata receives a request from the swordsmith Murata Tetsuya to retrieve the cursed sword Benizakura which has been stolen to commit serial murder. Shinpachi and Elizabeth are ambushed by the assassin Nizo Okada, a previous antagonist known to the Yorozuya as Nizo the Butcher, who claims to have killed Katsura, showing them the hair he cut off. Gintoki comes to protect Shinpachi and Elizabeth but is overwhelmed by Nizo and the Benizakura, which is revealed to be no ordinary cursed sword. Before Nizo lands another fatal hit on Gintoki, Shinpachi slashes off one of Nizo's arms, forcing the latter to retreat when people started to gather at the commotion.

Meanwhile, Kagura, with the help of her pet Inugami Sadaharu, finds hints of Katsura's whereabouts in a ship owned by the Joi terrorist group Kiheitai led by Gintoki and Katsura's former ally, Shinsuke Takasugi. After the Kiheitai subdues Kagura, it is revealed that Nizo is one of them and that Murata Tetsuya has been acting as an accomplice in hopes of perfecting the Benizakura, which they had been mass-producing as a bioweapon. While Gintoki is recovering from his wounds, Murata Tetsuko reveals her brother's intentions and requests him to stop her brother. Shinpachi and Elizabeth discover Kagura's location through Sadaharu, with Shinpachi infiltrating the ship to save Kagura while Elizabeth leads Katsura's faction to attack the Kiheitai. While under attack, Takasugi slashes at Elizabeth only to be attacked by Katsura who has been hiding in the ship disguised as another Elizabeth. In the middle of the chaos between the two factions, Katsura blows up the factory and destroys all the remaining Benizakura, save for the one Nizo holds. Katsura wishes to confront Takasugi once again with Kagura and Shinpachi aiding him, facing off against two of the Kiheitai's core members: Matako Kijima the gunslinger and Henpeita Takechi the strategist, respectively.

Tetsuko gives Gintoki a new sword she created to battle Okada on their way to the Kiheitai's ship. Despite not having fully recovered yet, Gintoki manages to stay on par with Nizo's enhanced skills due to the latter's body suffering great stress from the Benizakura. Even as the Benizakura exerts Nizo's body to strengthen itself, Gintoki eventually overpowers Nizo as stated by Tetsuya that "the life or death confrontation [may have] awakened memories of battle that lay dormant inside of [Gintoki]." Nizo is eventually consumed by the Benizakura and goes berserk, interrupting Shinpachi and Kagura's respective battles. As Shinpachi, Kagura and Tetsuko try to save Gintoki from Nizo, Tetsuya sacrifices his life to protect his sister, realizing the error of his ways. Having briefly recovered, Gintoki uses Tetsuko's sword to finish off Nizo and destroys the Benizakura. Later, Takasugi reveals his intentions to destroy the Bakufu along with the rest of the world that took his, Katsura's and Gintoki's master, Shoyo Yoshida, from them. In order to gain power, Takasugi - along with the 5th core member of the Kiheitai Bansai Kawakami - allied with the amanto Harusame space pirates which Katsura and the Yorozuya had previously encountered, promising them Gintoki and Katsura's heads. Gintoki's group reunites with Katsura's and escape from the ship before declaring Takasugi as an enemy, that the next time they meet they will show no mercy regardless of their past.

Besides the main storyline, the film features two shorts added at the beginning and the end. The former has the Yorozuya trio comically introducing themselves to the audience with their self-proclaimed Gintama specialty background-only style while the latter has the series' cast discussing ideas for a second movie until they are interrupted by stand-ins of the Warner Bros. the Yorozuya initially referred to as Mr. War and Mr. Ner (refer to the former short) who cancel their next projects due to falsely claiming their Gintama anime are not considered "mega-hit" in Japan, as they are considered "ripoffs" of other "mega-hit" manga like Bleach and Naruto.

== Cast ==
Character	Japanese	English
Gintoki Sakata	Tomokazu Sugita	Chris Patton
Shimura Shinpachi	Daisuke Sakaguchi	Mark X. Laskowski
Kagura	Rie Kugimiya	Luci Christian
Katsura Kotarou	Akira Ishida	Illich Guardiola
Hijikata Toushirou	Kazuya Nakai	Blake Shepard
Okita Sougo	Kenichi Suzumura	Clint Bickham
Kondou Isao	Susumu Chiba	David Wald
Takasugi Shinsuke	Takehito Koyasu	Kyle Colby Jones
Shimura Tae	Satsuki Yukino	Shelley Calene-Black

== Promotion ==
In October 2009, Warner Bros. registered the Internet domain name "Gintama-movie.com" although they did not confirm the making of a film. In the 2009's 58th issue of Weekly Shōnen Jump, released later that month, it was confirmed the development of such film giving also the tagline "Gintama Wasshoi Matsuri!!" with "Wasshoi" being a shout commonly done in Japanese festivals. One of the TV commercials of the film teases that the "true last scene" of the anime is in the film. Prior to the film's premiere, a festival known as "Gintama Haru Matsuri 2010" (銀魂 春祭り2010; lit. 'Gintama Spring Festival') was held at Ryōgoku's Ryōgoku Kokugikan indoor arena in March 2010. There, the first three minutes of the film were shown to the audience and the staff in charge talked to them. A DVD of this event was released on April 6, 2011. Does provided the musical themes "Bakuchi Dancer" (バクチダンサー, Bakuchi Dansā) and "Boku Tachi no Kisetsu" (僕たちの季節) for the film.

== Release ==
In Japan it premiered on April 24, 2010, picking up US$ 2.118.342 on 90 screens during its first days, and earned US$12.86 million in total. The film was released in DVD in both regular and limited releases on December 15, 2010, the latter including a bonus CD. Aniplex rereleased it in Blu-ray format on June 26, 2013.

Sentai Filmworks released the film in both DVD and Blu-ray format in North America on May 29, 2012, as Gintama: The Motion Picture. Although previous releases of the TV series by Sentai have only been in Japanese with English subtitles, their release of the movie is bilingual, and contained an English dub in addition to the Japanese track with English subtitles, marking the animated franchise's English-language debut. Manga Entertainment distributed the film in the United Kingdom while Madman Entertainment published it in Australia.

== Reception ==
It was released on April 24, 2010, grossing about ¥1.07 billion ($10.4 million) in Japanese theatres. The Japanese DVD sold 119,291 units in 2011, becoming the 18th bestselling DVD from that year. It received the Prugio Citizen's Choice Award at the Puchon International Fantastic Film Festival as it was elected the best feature film by the audience.

The film was well received by publications for anime. Eliot Page from UK Anime Network rated it 9 out of 10 commenting it could be used as a way to get into the series. Chris Homer from Fandom Post gave it a 7 out of 10, recommending it mainly to fans of the series.
