= Gintoki Sakata =

- Gintama character
- Gintoki Sakata by Hideaki Sorachi
- First appearance: Gintama Lesson 1: Nobody with Natural Wavy Hair Can Be That Bad
- Created by: Hideaki Sorachi
- Portrayed by: Shun Oguri
- Voiced by: Japanese: Tomokazu Sugita Other: Haruka Tomatsu (genderswapped); Kazuya Nakai (bodyswapped with Hijikata); Asami Yaguchi (young); English: Chris Patton (first movie); Michael Daingerfield (Gintama°); Roly Gutiérrez (first anime series) Other: Michael Adamthwaite (bodyswapped with Hijikata); Sabrina Pitre (Gintama°; young)

Gintoki Sakata (Japanese: 坂田 銀時, Hepburn: Sakata Gintoki) is a fictional character and the protagonist of the manga and anime franchise Gintama created by Hideaki Sorachi. Gintoki's name serves as part of the basis of the series' title. He is introduced as a former rebel samurai who lives in a fictionalized version of 1860s Japan after being invaded and transformed by aliens. Gintoki once fought in the Joui (rebel) war until a tragic event where he was unable to protect what he was fighting for, leading to him instead establishing "Yorozuya Gin-chan" (万事屋銀ちゃん)" (with Yorozuya (万事屋) literally meaning "worker of 10,000 jobs"), choosing to make a living as a freelancer for hire in Edo. Eventually, Shinpachi Shimura and Kagura choose to stay and work with him, forming a found family. Across the series, more details about Gintoki's past are revealed leading him to encounter former friends as enemies. As the main character, Gintoki has appeared in most of the episodes of the anime series, as well as in other media related to the franchise, including the film and all of the spin-off video games and original video animations.

Sorachi created the character after suggestions of his editors of having silver-haired samurai. He was originally going to be based on Hijikata Toshizō, the vice-captain from the Shinsengumi special forces. However, Sorachi changed his mind as he did not want the main character to be working in an organization and further remodeled his design into the present one. In the anime series Gintoki was voiced by Tomokazu Sugita, who enjoyed his character. For the English release of the first movie, he was voiced by Chris Patton, whereas in the Gintama° episodes Gintoki was played by Michael Daingerfield; later, Roly Gutiérrez dubbed him in the first anime series. Shun Oguri portrays him in the live-action films.

Gintoki's character has received a positive critical response from various reviewers and publications for manga, anime, and other media, although his characterization in some story arcs has been criticized. When he once parodied a Japanese politician in 2016, manga publisher Shueisha faced controversy. Gintoki has remained highly popular among Gintama fans, ranking first in numerous popularity polls. Merchandise based on Gintoki has also been released, including figurines.

== Creation and development ==
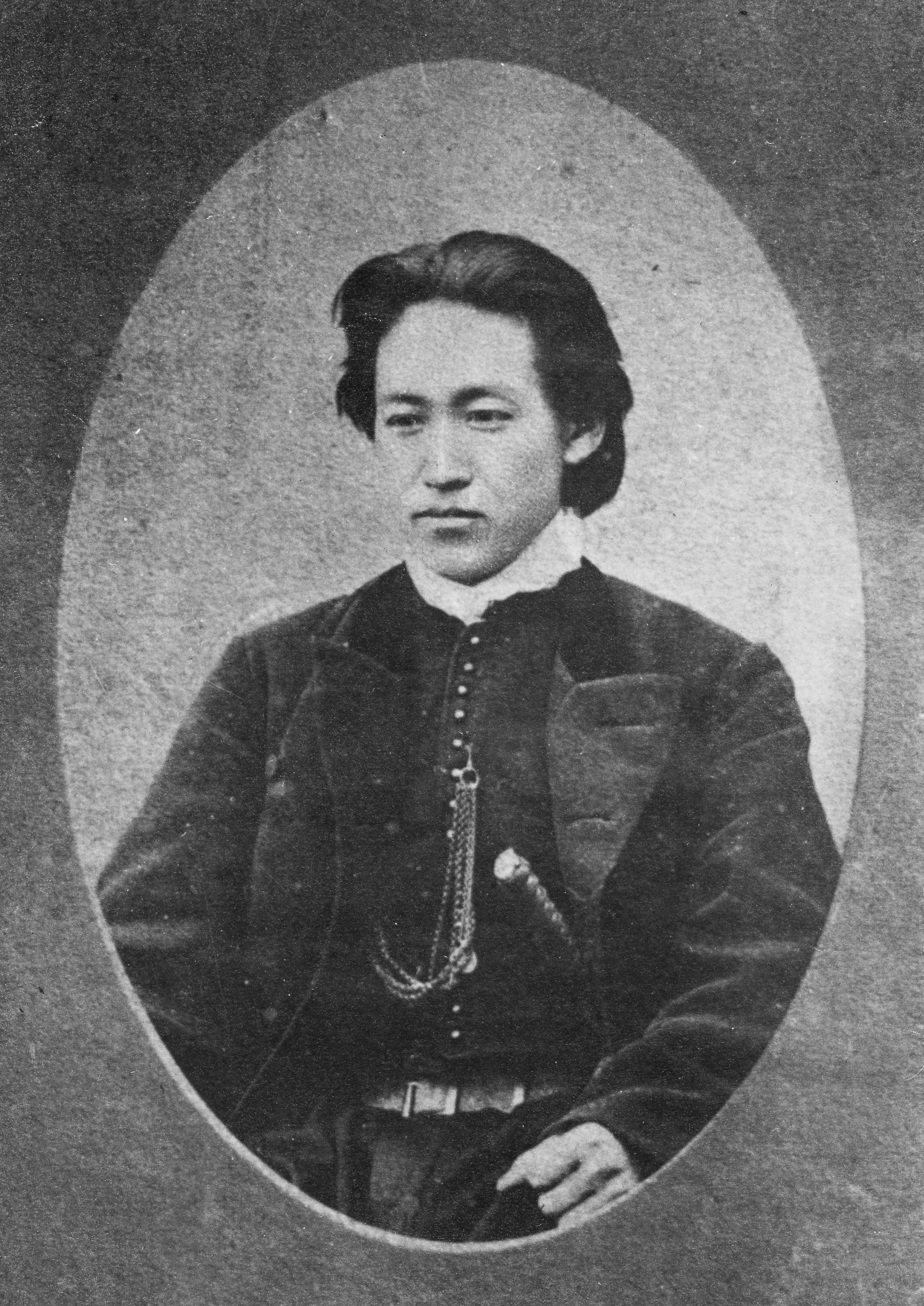
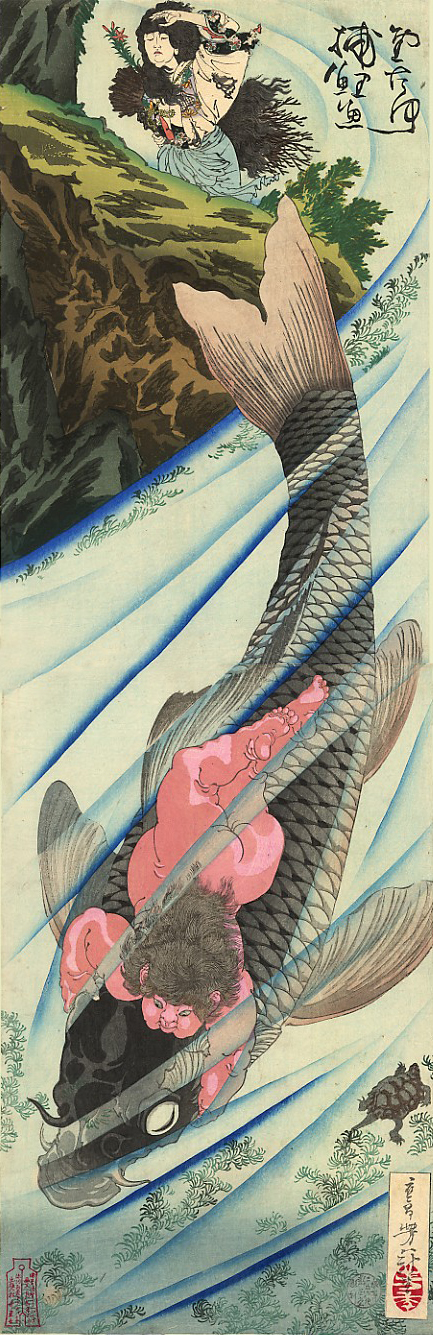
Hijikata Toshizō and Kintarō were the models of Gintoki's character.

While brainstorming on the name for a manga, Hideaki Sorachi's editor commented, "Do you think a silver samurai would be cool?" This inspired Sorachi to create the main character after deciding the series should be named Gintama. Sorachi's initial plan for his first major series was to center it around a fictionalized version of the Shinsengumi, mostly to ride off the hype for Shinsengumi!, a Japanese drama starring idol actors as the famous Japanese special police force. However, Sorachi's version was planned to be as unrealistic as possible; his force included both men and women possessing bizarre traits that were nothing like the original Shinsengumi, and that would seep into many of the characters that would be part of his eventual manga. One of the characters from this set was a silver-haired man who was to be the representation of prominent member Hijikata Toshizō. Sorachi particularly liked Hijikata and wanted this character to be the hero of his series despite the lack of similarities with the real Hijikata.

While Sorachi loved the design he created for his silver-haired Hijikata, he could not draw out his character or figure out what he would do in the series. He considered dropping the character and his editor nearly forced him to give up on him just as the original Shinsengumi concept was falling apart. Eventually it was decided that the silver-haired character would be an original lead character, while the Shinsengumi would be portrayed as comedic foils. Quickly giving him the nickname of "Gin-san", the original concept of the silver-haired Hijikata was shattered and Sorachi recreated the character from the ground up into the lazy-eyed freelancer he would be in the series. The concept behind Gintoki's character is that he is a strong person who does not belong to any organization and tends to disregard rules. Although Gintoki was roughly based on Sakata Kintoki, Sorachi did not intend Gintoki to be a descendant of Sakata. Unlike common heroes within manga series, Gintoki does not undergo character development. This is connected with the character's background as several things in his life changed due to the Amanto invasion and wishes some things not change.

For the anime series, Gintoki has been voiced by Tomokazu Sugita in Japanese. When learning he was selected to voice the Gintama's main character Sugita wanted to show off to fit the character. However, he later took a bigger view on Gintoki's character; understanding that Gintoki lives with a lot of people's support, Sugita changed his mindset when voicing the character. In the English dub of the first movie, he is voiced by Chris Patton, while Michael Daingerfield voices him the Gintama° series.

== Appearances ==
=== In Gintama ===
Gintoki Sakata is a freelancer former samurai living in an era where aliens known as the Amanto have come to Earth after the Joi War, a battle in which the latter defeated the former. As a child, he was taught by Shoyo Yoshida, with his classmates being two of his future Joi allies, Kotaro Katsura and Shinsuke Takasugi. Shoyo was unjustly accused of trying to raise an army, which resulted in his capture, with Gintoki and his friends entering the Joi War to rescue their teacher. During that period, he was known as the "White Demon" (白夜叉, Shiroyasha; "White Knight" in English dub) due to his silver hair and white coat he wore in battle, which, combined with his impressive capabilities as a swordsman, made him famous among his comrades and struck fear into Amanto. During a time in the Joui War when he, Katsura and Takasugi were captured by Tendosho, under orders by Sada Sada, Gintoki was forced to execute his master without any choice before his master's final bidding to him right in front of his comrades' eyes.

After his master's death, Gintoki chooses to open a freelance business where he could handle matters his own way, while continuing to live by his own samurai code. In his job, he gets two employees, the samurai apprentice Shinpachi Shimura and the alien girl Kagura, and comes to have a close relationship with both of them. The group often have problems to pay the monthly rent for Otose, Gintoki's landlady whom he swore to protect after eating the food offerings meant to her husband's grave.

Despite his age, Gintoki often shows various childish behaviours, most notably his insatiable sweet tooth. However, Gintoki has been warned by his doctor to control his sugar intake. He is also obsessed with reading the manga anthology magazine Weekly Shōnen Jump. Despite being a dangerous combatant well-versed in the ways of the sword, he acts like a coward most of the time to avoid needless bloodshed because of the trauma of suffering the loss of most of his friends and allies during the Joui war. He is quite sadistic, much like Okita Sougo. This may explain the reason why Sougo feels a certain attachment to him as he addresses Gintoki as "Boss" every time they meet. This is can be shown where he always treats Katsura, Sarutobi and Hijikata, in various extreme ways and his tendencies of quitting easily on certain moments which can lead to a punishment and someone's death, in which he can handle easily and even enjoy it. He is very respectful of the memory of his teacher Yoshida Shouyou due to his actions (opening a school for poor children, with Gintoki there as the first student)

As a member of the Four Heavenly Kings, Gintoki is an extremely powerful swordsman. Throughout the series, he has demonstrated tremendous skill in swordsmanship, being able to fight on equal grounds against Utsuro, the evil persona of his master (whom Gintoki has never been able to win a match) or other Amanto that are considered the strongest in their respective class. His swordplay is rough, but far from unrefined. The bokuto he wields is a Hoshikudaki (星砕, lit. star destroyer), which he purchases through a TV shopping program, whenever one is broken. Using this sword, he is often seen cutting, smashing, deflecting and basically destroying all kinds of strong objects such as a metal cannon, or deflecting a beam sword without noticeable damage. Occasionally, though, Gintoki has used other swords, including real ones such as katana, in combat when he needs it due to a tougher encounter. Although Gintoki is more than capable of defeating powerful Amanto warriors and various other samurai, he will not hesitate to use tricks and manipulation if it means a quick and easy victory.

=== In other media ===
Though also part of the Gintama franchise, Gintoki is also the lead character of the spinoff stories "3-Z Ginpachi-Sensei", where he is a high school teacher putting up with the idiocies of all of the other characters who are his students at the school. The two OVAs of the series also feature Gintoki with the first featuring multiple sidestories and the latter Gintoki's time in the war against the aliens. Gintoki has been the leading character in the two movies the series had. The first film, Gintama: A New Retelling Benizakura Arc, has Gintoki reprising his role from the Benizakura Arc where he goes in the search of his friend Kotaro Katsura as well as the mysterious sword Benizakura. The second film, Gintama: The Movie: The Final Chapter: Be Forever Yorozuya has Gintoki travelling to a future where Edo has been destroyed and has to stop the threat that ruined the city.

Gintoki's character appeared in various video games based on the Gintama series. Gintoki has also been featured as a playable fighter in two crossover Weekly Shonen Jump-based video games: Jump Super Stars and Jump Ultimate Stars, both times alongside Kagura. He also appears as a playable character in J-Stars Victory Vs and The King of Fighters All Star. Gintoki's costume is also featured in the video game God Eater 2 as an alternative skin.

== Reception ==
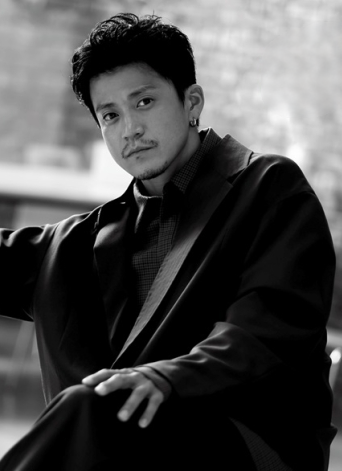
Shun Oguri portrays Gintoki in the liveactions.

Gintoki remains the most popular character in the series based on polls taken within Weekly Shōnen Jump magazine. He has also been featured in various types of merchandise connected to the franchise. In the Newtype Japanese journal, Gintoki has commonly appeared within the top ten of best male characters between the 7th and 8th spot. In another Newtype poll from March 2010, Gintoki was voted as the eighth most popular male anime character from the 2000s. In the Anime Grand Prix polls, Gintoki was voted as one of the most popular male anime characters. The Japanese music distributor Recochoku has made two annual surveys of which anime characters that people would like to marry. Gintoki ranked second, then first in the category "The Character I Want to Be My Groom." Polls from Niconico and "ranking.goo.ne.jp" (popular Japanese survey sites) had female fans voting Gintoki as the second most appealing male character overall and the seventh-most appealing Weekly Shōnen Jump character in anime, respectively. Ike and Momiken from the Japanese rock band SPYAIR commented that Gintoki was their favorite character from the series as both of them found him cool.

Gintoki's character has also received a critical response from various western publications for manga, anime, and other media. While reviewing the fifth volume of the manga Carlo Santos from Anime News Network found Gintoki's personality as one of the sources of comedy in the series, remarking the way he talks as well as his actions through the chapters. In the chapters where Gintoki suffers from amnesia, Santos noted that Gintoki's different personality in such state makes him "decidedly not funny". On the other hand, About.com writer Deb Aoki found Gintoki's carefree attitude and his desire to protect people as a "tradition of other shonen anti-heroes." She also noted his "low-blood sugar moments" make him look cranky. Michael Aronson from Manga Life criticized Gintoki's expression in the first volumes from the series as he mentions it does not reflect his dialogues. He also commented that the series succeeds if it is about Gintoki's job, adding that some of his fights against other characters do not help increase the series' popularity. While reviewing the first film's Chris Homer from The Fandom Post stated that Gintoki is "a typical shounen hero, a bit dumb but has a kind heart and able to access power when he needs to protect his friends" with Kagura being more likable than him during the review. Other negative comments regarding focused on fights such as Hijikata's fight against Gintoki.

When the 2016 season of the anime began, Gintoki parodied a Japanese politician, Ryutaro Nonomura, crying for misuse of funding. While this had no negative consequences, the staff at Shueisha, the company that publishes the manga, admitted they felt nervous. Another parody was made by Gintoki in the 2017 release of the anime with he referencing the Gilgamesh Night show due to the series taking its timeslot. Anime News Network writer Amy McNulty had mixed feelings about Michael Daingerfield's work as Gintoki's English actor as she found it too similar to Hijikata and Katsura. On the other hand, Mike Toole, another member from Anime News Network, found Daingerfield's work as appealing as the one from the original cast, Tomokazu Sugita.
