= List of Gintama characters =

A selection of the characters from the series

The characters from the anime and manga series Gintama were created by Hideaki Sorachi. The story is set in Edo, the "Land of the Samurai", which has been invaded by aliens named Amanto, who subsequently coexist with humans. Despite the time, there are various advanced technologies and even spaceships which allow people to travel across space. Although the series' story is commonly episodic, there are also a few story arcs which are developed through various chapters.

When creating the series, Sorachi developed various characters based on the historical Shinsengumi, which he is a fan of. Additionally, other characters from the series are also based on real people. The characters from the series have also been features in pieces of merchandise based on their appearances as well as video games. Response to the characters has commonly been mixed, with various publication praising the comedy situations and criticizing the artwork used in the series.

== Creation and conception ==
Before the start from Gintama's serialization, Hideaki Sorachi wrote various one-shot manga. Although he considered the story Samuraider very poor, the setting of such one-shot served as the base for Gintama such as the addition of alien characters. While thinking of the name of a manga, Sorachi's editor commented "Do you think a silver samurai would be cool?" That inspired Sorachi to write the main character from the series after deciding the series should be named Gintama. However, the main character was originally meant to be Hijikata Toushiro as Sorachi was a fan of the Shinsengumi, most notably Hijikata Toshizō (the Shinsengumi who was the base for the one of Gintama), after he saw Burn! Sword!. When Sorachi could not "shake off" Hijikata's initial design, he decided not to use him as the lead character, but added him along with the Shinsengumi to the story. The pilot chapter from the series had a different plot to the one from the serialization: Sorachi kept adding Shinsengumi to the story such as Harada Sanosuke. As all of these characters were older than most of the recurring ones from the series, Sorachi removed them thinking they were not entertaining.

When asked by a fan if all the characters from the series were based on Real-Edo life citizens, Sorachi responded he was right and mentioned that Gintoki was roughly based on Sakata Kintoki, but added that he did not mean to make Gintoki a descendant from Sakata. Regarding character designs, Sorachi stated that all the characters' faces are based on Shinpachi as by just making a few changes such as modifying his hair a little and removing his glasses, people will get different characters from the manga. Sorachi has stated that he has liked all the characters he designed and whenever a character has been absent from the manga for various chapters, he tries to make him return. On the other hand, when a character appears too often, he does not want to make him star for the next chapters. However, he states that such "cycle" does not apply to the Yorozuya trio.

In response to comments regarding how the series is full of "losers" Sorachi stated he did not make that intentionally. Moreover, he views them as likable characters and states they are always facing their negative sides which helped them have friends. Before reaching the series' end Sorachi wishes to examine every character within the cast but at the same time there are part he does not want to explore fearing they would become less interesting due to a lack of mystery.

== Main characters ==
The main characters of the series are part of "Yorozuya", known in the Japanese version as Yorozuya Gin-chan (万事屋銀ちゃん; lit. "General Merchant Gin-chan") is the name of Gintoki Sakata's freelancer business. Gintoki runs his business from a second-floor apartment, which he rents from Otose.^{[ch. 2]} As the name implies, such businesses involve performing odd jobs for a fee. Incidentally, he and Kagura also live there, and Shinpachi occasionally stays at the apartment.^{[ch. 4]} In later chapters, Gintoki reveals that prior to meeting Shinpachi and Kagura he worked in Yorozuya along with three people of African descent whom he threw to a river when they planned to abandon him or started dating other people.^{[ch. 195]}

=== Gintoki Sakata ===
Voiced by: Tomokazu Sugita (Japanese); Roly Gutiérrez (first series), Chris Patton (The Movie), Michael Daingerfield (third series) (English)
Portrayed by: Shun Oguri

Gintoki Sakata (坂田 銀時, Sakata Gintoki) is a samurai living in an era when samurai are no longer needed. He is recognized by his natural wavy hair and sweet tooth. He often blames his "perm" hair of sorts to be a source of some of his misfortune.^{[ch. 1]} Gintoki lives with Kagura and Shinpachi, taking on odd jobs to make the world a better place and to pay their rent.^{[ch. 4]} In the Joi war, he was known as the "White Devil" (白夜叉, Shiroyasha) due to his silver hair and white coat he wore in battle, which, combined with his impressive capabilities as a swordsman, made him famous among his comrades and struck fear into Amanto.^{[ch. 6]}

=== Shinpachi Shimura ===
Voiced by: Daisuke Sakaguchi (Japanese); Clay Cartland (first series), Mark X. Laskowski (The Movie), Cole Howard (third series) (English)
Portrayed by: Masaki Suda

Shinpachi Shimura (志村 新八, Shimura Shinpachi) is a teenager who joins Gintoki's freelancer business to learn the ways of the samurai. He stays at his family's dojo along with his older sister Tae Shimura. Both used to live there with their father who died when they were still children. In order to make their living, Shinpachi started working in a restaurant in which he met Gintoki when the former was being harassed by Amanto officials. Gintoki beats up the Amanto officials, not to stand up for Shinpachi, but to get revenge for his spilled parfait. Gintoki attempts to frame Shinpachi for the crime, and to make up for it, Gintoki helps Shinpachi save his older sister Tae from being coerced into joining a brothel by an Amanto as his father left them with an enormous debt.^{[ch. 1]} Although he commonly criticizes Gintoki's lazy behaviour, Shinpachi comes to regard him as a very important person to him in the same fashion as Kagura.^{[ch. 19]} Shinpachi also regards himself as the comic relief character from the series (even though he most often tries to act as the voice of reason for the main trio, noticing and fretting over things the other characters miss, regardless of how clear they may seem), but tends to take that as something important.^{[ch. 228]} As the readers' perspective, Sorachi notes that while he can be weak he will take action when necessary resulting in his growth across the series.

Shinpachi is easily identified by his glasses which he wears as result of hypnotizing himself to eat Tae's poor meals.^{[ch. 17]} When trying to identify Shinpachi, several characters tend to notice first his glasses even though he may not be using them; Gintoki comments that the reason for this is that most of Shinpachi's design are his glasses.^{[ch. 203]} Despite his timid appearance, Shinpachi is a more than competent swordsman of his family's Kakidō-Ryu, the type of swordsmanship his dojo teaches. Shinpachi is also the captain of the "Otsu's Imperial Guard," an Otsu's fan club, and takes his role seriously. Other members of the fan club treat him with utmost respect, something he is not usually treated with.^{[ch. 7]} His fanaticism for Otsu started prior to her career when he was inspired by the effort she gave in her songs.^{[ch. 19]} His character is loosely based on the historical figure Nagakura Shinpachi, who Sorachi had previously used in one of his previous manga. Although he shares his last name with the Japanese comedian Ken Shimura, Sorachi picked that last name to fit his samurai heritage.

=== Kagura ===
Voiced by: Rie Kugimiya (Japanese); Crystal Lopez (first series), Luci Christian (The Movie), Jocelyn Loewen (third series) (English)
Portrayed by: Kanna Hashimoto

Kagura (神楽) is a young Amanto girl who belongs to the Yato Clan, one of the strongest and most bloodthirsty of the Amanto races, although Kagura rejects that part of herself. She came to Earth to earn money for her family, and to escape her violent Yato heritage. She found work fighting for a gang of hoodlums, but when they ordered her to kill her target, she ran away. Not long afterwards, she meets Gintoki and Shinpachi, when they accidentally run over her with Gintoki's scooter. After they help her to make a clean break from the gang, she intimidates Gintoki into hiring her.^{[ch. 3]} Kagura and Gintoki have an odd brother-sister-like relationship and she commonly imitates his bad habits.^{[ch. 7]}^{[ch. 50]}

The Yato have "translucent" skin that is highly sensitive to sunlight, so Kagura carries an umbrella at all times. The parasol is also the Yato clan's weapon of choice; Kagura's umbrella is bulletproof and fires bullets from its tip. Because of her Yato blood, she is extremely strong and can stop a speeding motorscooter with one hand.^{[ch. 4]} However, she cannot control her strength perfectly; most of her pets, with the exception of Sadaharu, have all met an untimely demise at her hands. Kagura also has an unusually strong appetite, making her capable of consuming large quantity of food within a matter of seconds. Nevertheless, her tastes are endearingly plain.^{[ch. 4]}

Kagura is also somewhat of a tomboy, as she speaks in a blunt or perverted way. This is due to Sorachi not finding the too feminine characters believable and instead made Kagura from an anti-female lead perspective resulting in Kagura being the first female lead in manga to throw up. In the absence of Gintoki and Shinpachi, she is often seen partaking in games with various neighborhood boys. She regards Shisengumi's Sougo Okita as a rival and often competes against him.^{[ch. 30]} Her speech often ends in -aru, characteristic of the Japanese's impression of a Chinese accent. In Japanese, Kagura speaks in a stereotypical dialect that is associated with Chinese immigrants. In the English-translated manga, she punctuates her sentences with "yup", "uh-huh", "nope", and the like. Her character is based on Princess Kaguya from the story The Tale of the Bamboo Cutter while her name comes from a place on the island of Hokkaido. In a Newtype poll, Kagura ranked #21 for the top 30 most popular female anime character from the 2000s. Kagura was ranked #3 for most cheerful anime character in Animedia magazine's 2010 character awards.

=== Sadaharu ===
Voiced by: Mikako Takahashi (Japanese); Kyle C. Jones (The Movie) (English)

Sadaharu (定春) is an abandoned inugami who is collected by Kagura. He is named by Kagura, after her first pet. He was originally owned by a pair of miko sisters (Ane and Mone) who left him due to economical problems. Sadaharu chomps on anything smaller than itself, such as Gintoki's and other people's heads. Kagura seems to be the only one who can control him, for she has immense strength.^{[ch. 10]} Though he is dangerous when Gintoki first receives him, he becomes quite tame in the later chapters. He sometimes obeys Gintoki at certain points, and helps the main characters in many occasions. Kagura and Gintoki are often seen riding on his back, as he is big enough to carry two full-grown adults. The name Sadaharu is actually often used by Kagura for all her pets, whom all are dead. This Sadaharu is currently the 27th. His defending counterpart (to whom he is the attacking counterpart) is named Komako (狛子), appearing as a mini-version of Sadaharu.

== Supporting characters ==
=== Kabukichou's Residents ===
Kabukichou (歌舞伎町 Kabuki Town or District) is the place where the Yorozuya and Otose Snack House is set up at. It is unofficially under the jurisdiction of Kabukichou's elite four members, the Four Generals (四天王).

==== Tae Shimura ====
Voiced by: Satsuki Yukino (Japanese); Shelley Calene-Black (The Movie), Janyse Jaud (third series) (English)
Portrayed by: Masami Nagasawa

Tae Shimura (志村 妙, Shimura Tae) is Shinpachi's older sister, referring to her as "Big Sis"(姉上: ane-ue). She runs the Kakidōkan Dojo, the family dojo, with her brother, working part-time to pay for the upkeep.^{[ch. 1]} She is usually addressed as "Otae" (お妙); the "お" (O) is an honorific used to refer to women. Kagura always addresses her as "Big sister" (姉御, Ane-go) or "Boss". She often mercilessly beats up Kondo Isao and Gintoki whenever they anger her, but she has a good side of her own. She almost always smile in front of her friends, one that might be called "a fake smile", since that she is actually feeling sad inside but she does not want to acknowledge it.

Her cooking skills are terrible, with her "special" tamagoyaki being so inedible that Kondo suffered amnesia after eating it and others are barely able to swallow it down. She has strong principles and believes in maintaining what is precious, even if it means throwing away honor and dignity. She believes that if apologies were enough, seppuku would not exist.^{[ch. 1]}

==== Otose ====
Voiced by: Kujira (Japanese); Jeni Hacker (first series), Shelley Calene-Black (The Movie), Samantha Ferris (third series) (English)
Portrayed by: Midoriko Kimura

Otose (お登勢), whose real name is Ayano Terada (寺田 綾乃, Terada Ayano), is Gintoki's landlady. Despite constant arguments over Gintoki's general inability to pay his rent, she is confident in his defense of her.^{[ch. 2]} They both met shortly after the end of the war between samurais and Amanto when Gintoki swore to protect her after he ate food offerings that were meant for her dead husband.^{[ch. 4]} She was very pretty when she was young and worked at a restaurant. She secretly fed poor children dumplings for free, and was fired.^{[ch. 11]} She is one of the four "emperors" that rule the Kabuki District and has the personal title "Empress of the Kabuki District".

==== Catherine ====
Voiced by: Yū Sugimoto (Japanese); Connie Fernandez (first series), Luci Christian (The Movie), Saffron Henderson (third series) (English)

Catherine (キャサリン, Kyasarin) is an amanto who resembles a cat. At first, she seems to be a diligent worker at Otose's snack shop who is trying to support her family, but soon reveals herself to be a thief.^{[ch. 4]} Despite this, Otose hires her again after she is released from prison, and Catherine has since then become extremely loyal to Otose. She used to work as a thief with three other catlike amanto males. She speaks Japanese with an accent, represented by katakana characters in the place of hiragana; she is the only member of her former crew to speak this way.

==== Ana Ketsuno ====
Voiced by: Sayaka Narita (Japanese); Nicole Bouma (English)

Ana Ketsuno (結野 アナ, Ketsuno Ana) is a popular weather girl and reporter from the Oedo news. Gintoki develops a major crush on her. When they eventually meet, it is revealed that her reporter position is just a day job, and she actually is a member of one of the major clans that work as Onmyoji during night-time and her real name is actually Crystel Ketsuno (結野 クリステル, Ketsuno Kirisuteru).

==== Ane ====
Voiced by: Maya Okamoto

Ane (阿音), along with her younger twin sister Mone and the Inugami, Sadaharu and Komako were in charge of protecting the Koryuumon, the largest Dragon Hole (龍穴, ryuuketsu), which directs the energy flow of the planet. The Amanto, however, built the Terminal right on top of it, driving the sisters out of business. Since then, Ane has been working as a hostess at 'Snack Smile', where she, along with Shimura Tae, attracts the most customers by using her priestess image, something her sister disapproves of.

==== Mone ====
Voiced by: Masako Jō

Mone (百音), along with her older twin sister Ane and the Inugami, Sadaharu and Komako were in charge of protecting the Koryuumon, the largest Dragon Hole (龍穴, ryuuketsu), which directs the energy flow of the planet. The Amanto, however, built the Terminal right on top of it, driving the sisters out of business. Since then, Mone seems to live a peaceful life, continuing her profession as a priestess with little results. She greatly disapproves of her sister being a hostess.

==== Kishin Mademoiselle Saigou ====
Voiced by: Hisao Egawa (Japanese); Alex Alvarez (first series) (English)

Kishin Mademoiselle Saigou (鬼神 マドマーゼル 西郷, Kishin Madomāzeru Saigou) is one of Kabuki Town's Four Generals. His real name is Tokumori Saigou (西郷 特盛, Saigou Tokumori), based on the historical Saigō Takamori. Originally a member of the Joi resistance, Saigou left a legacy etched in history as he was able to single-handedly take down an Amanto warship during the Joi War. As he only wore a white fundoshi when he battled on the warship, he also became known as "Shiro-fun no Saigou" (White Sumo Thong Saigou).

Saigou has a son, called Teruhiko. He also owns an okama bar, and is the "mama" of the place. As his wife died when Teruhiko was still young, he takes up both the roles of father and mother to Teruhiko, and his outlook on gender therefore is blurred. However Saigou has no regrets about what he has become, as it was for his son's sake, and has said he would continue to live as he is. Saigou is also against anyone who makes fun of okamas.

==== Taizo Hasegawa ====
Voiced by: Fumihiko Tachiki (Japanese); Chris Jahn (first series), Andrew Love (The Movie, miscredited to Christopher Ayres), Ted Cole (third series) (English)
Portrayed by: Fumihiko Tachiki

Taizo Hasegawa (長谷川 泰三, Hasegawa Taizō)(Madao) is introduced as an official working for the Bakufu, but after he punches Amanto dignitary Prince Hata, whom he was assigned to serve and protect, for letting his alien pet run amok and nearly eat people, ^{[ch. 2]} his superior asks him to succumb to his shame and commit seppuku, which upon hearing he ran away from his quarters. Although his wife, Hatsu Hasegawa (長谷川 ハツ, Hasegawa Hatsu), also leaves him, they never get divorced as both are still in love.^{[ch. 155]} Hasegawa initially believes that humans should focus on appeasing the Amanto, but after his encounter with Gintoki his mindset changes. Since then, he has been living a life of somewhat like a loser, getting fired almost every time he gets a new job, mostly due to the unfavourable look his sunglasses and goatee give him. No matter what, he refuses to remove his sunglasses because it is the only thing he has left to remind him of his successful past. He is often referred to as "Madao" (マダオ), which stands for "totally useless middle-aged man" (まるでダメなオッさん, marude dame na ossan) in Japanese, among a whole host of other funny descriptions utilising the initial syllable of each word. He and Gintoki become friends and spend most of their free time gambling.^{[ch. 16]} His name is based on the historical Hasegawa Heizou.

==== Gengai Hiraga ====
Voiced by: Takeshi Aono (first voice), Bin Shimada (second voice) (Japanese); Scott McNeil (third series) (English)
Portrayed by: Tsuyoshi Muro

Gengai Hiraga (平賀 源外, Hiraga Gengai) is Kabuki District's greatest mechanic. He wears a welding mask that covers his eyes, he has no hair and is recognized by a grey beard. Gengai's skills were used for the war between the Amanto and the samurai which resulted in his son joining the Kiheitai in hopes of preventing his father's machines from being turned into instruments of war. However, Gengai's son died leaving him with a deep emotional scar, and the Kiheitai's leader Shinsuke Takasugi convinces him to take revenge by killing the Shogun.^{[ch. 30]} However, his plans are foiled by the Yorozuya and Gintoki talks him down. When his creation implanted with his son's personality refuses to attack Gintoki, Gengai abandons his hatred but is still a fugitive from the law.^{[ch. 31]} He also helps in repairing Tama, as well as help Yorozuya to stop the rogue robot from destroying the space port in the same arc. His name is based on the historical Hiraga Gennai.

==== Musashi ====
Voiced by: Koichi Sakaguchi

Musashi (武蔵) is homeless man who wears large glasses and an orange cap without pants. He seems to have many talents, including badminton. He is very similar to Hasegawa in that they are both often seen doing various odd jobs. Despite looking completely different otherwise, he is sometimes mistaken for Gintoki due to their similar hairstyles. He is eventually revealed to be the father of Ikumatsu and that his real name is Nishiki Matsugorou.

==== Katsuo Kurogoma ====
Voiced by: Katashi Ishizuka (Japanese); Brian Drummond (third series) (English)

Katsuo Kurogoma (黒駒 勝男, Kurogoma Katsuo) is a small boss of the yakuza group Dobunezumi. Kurogoma's group tries to harass and extort money from the Takamagahara host club, but their plan is thwarted by the Yorozuya trio. Kurogoma also owns a female dachshund called Meru-chan, which he dotes on a lot, and recently Sadaharu has fallen in love with Meru-chan. As Sadaharu had saved Kurogoma from drowning, the latter gave Sadaharu the approval to date Meru-chan. Kurogoma also believes that the primary law in the universe is that things have to be in the ratio 7:3. His name is based on the historical Kurokoma no Katsuzo.

==== Kyoushirou Honjou ====
Voiced by: Atsushi Kisaichi

Kyoushirou Honjou (本城 狂死郎, Honjō Kyōshirō) is the number one host in Kabuki Town. He runs the Takamagahara (高天原) host club, which he opened together with his good friend Hachiro. Kyoshiro's real name is Hachiro Kuroita. His mother came to Edo to try to find him, but he was too ashamed to reunite with her, as he had undergone plastic surgery and had changed the face his parents had given him. However his mother had recognised him, but she was not angry; instead she left him a note to tell him that she would always be proud of him as her son.

==== Hachiro ====
Voiced by: Hidenari Ugaki

Hachiro (八郎, Hachirō) is the bodyguard at the Takamagahara host club, and a good friend of Kyoushirou. He has a gigantic afro and his moustache is connected to his nose hairs. However, this was the result of a failed plastic surgery, and Hachiro was originally a girl, whose name was Hanako.

==== Hedoro ====
Voiced by: Tesshō Genda (Japanese); Jim Ballard (English)

Hedoro (屁怒絽)) is an Amanto of the Dakini Tribe who gave a flower to the Yorozuya, as he was moving in as their new neighbor and opened a flower shop. During the Silver Soul arc, he rises up to fight against his tribe on behalf of Edo.

==== Tetsuko Murata ====
Voiced by: Keiko Nemoto (Japanese); Darcy Han (English)

Tetsuko Murata (村田 鉄子, Murata Tetsuko) is a swordsmith in Edo. She is the daughter of the late renowned swordsmith Jintetsu Murata (村田 仁鉄, Murata Jintetsu), and younger sister of Tetsuya Murata (村田 鉄矢, Murata Tetsuya), the latter of which being the creator of the Benizakura blade Nizou used against Gintoki. She has helped Sakata Gintoki and the Yorozuya at several occasions.

==== Tama ====
Voiced by: Omi Minami (Japanese); Chantal Strand (third series) (English)

Tama (たま), codenamed Fuyo Unit Zero, is an android found as a disembodied robot head by Gintoki. She was named by Kagura who was obsessed with eating egg on rice at the time.^{[ch. 140]} Tama is a robot created by Professor Ryuzan Hayashi to provide his sickly daughter with a companion. Hayashi tried to implant the personality of his daughter - Fuyou - into Tama, but the experiment killed his daughter in the process. Tama however, possesses the element known as the "Seed", and therefore retains some of Fuyou's personality and is capable of human emotions.^{[ch. 142]} The android Hayashi later begins a robot uprising, even hijacking the Terminal, in order to retrieve the Seed and Tama, whom he sees as the copy of Fuyou. The Yorozuya and Tama manage to stop Hayashi.^{[ch. 145]} In the aftermath Tama sacrifices herself to save Yoroyuza. Despite reconstructing her, Tama loses most of her memories during the showdown at the Terminal, remembering only that samurai are her friends.^{[ch. 146]} Her body is rebuilt, allowing her to become a complete robot maid again working at Otose's snack house. Acknowledging Gintoki's strength, Tama creates in her body a type of anti-viruses with the strongest and the leader of them, Leukocyte King (白血球王, Hakkekkyū Ou), being identical to Gintoki.

==== Heiji Kozenigata ====
Voiced by: Unshō Ishizuka

Heiji Kozenigata (小銭形 平次, Kozenigata Heiji) is a former 'Hard-boiled' police detective who does not live up to the expectation of his 'competent-looking face' and an occasional ally for the Yorozuya in different cases. Kozenigata is an orphan, who lost his parents and home at a young age to a band of murderous thieves looking for quick money. The sole survivor, he vowed to spend his life hunting down thieves as scum and murderers.

==== Haji ====
Voiced by: Kumiko Higa (Japanese); Britt Irvin (English)

Haji (ハジ) is Kozenigata's young sidekick. Before joining Kozenigata, she was a thief. She has a greater sense of responsibility and street-wise intelligence than her bumbling superior.

==== Seimei Ketsuno ====
Voiced by: Hikaru Midorikawa

Seimei Ketsuno (結野 晴明, Ketsuno Seimei) is Crystel Ketsuno's older brother and the current head of the Ketsuno clan. He is a genius and is considered to be the strongest Onmyoji in the clan's entire history.

==== Doman Shirino ====
Voiced by: Ken Narita

Doman Shirino (巳厘野 道満, Shirino Douman) is the current head of the Shirino clan and an Onmyoji, who was shunned as a child due to high expectations of matching the Ketsuno clan's strongest, but not being able to climb out of their shadow. He is the main antagonist of the Diviner arc, but returns as an ally in the final arc.

==== Gedomaru ====
Voiced by: Ayako Kawasumi

Gedomaru (外道丸, Gedoumaru) is a Shikigami of the Ketsuno Clan, who was given to Gintoki as a precaution by Crystel Ketsuno, who had requested the Yorozuya's assistance.

==== Jirochou Doromizu ====
Voiced by: Takayuki Sugō, Fumitoshi Miyajima (ep. 55), Tomoyuki Shimura (young)

Jirochou Doromizu (泥水 次郎長, Doromizu Jirochou) was the leader of the yakuza syndicate Dobunezumi Group, and one of the ruling 4 Devas of Kabuki District before he stepped down from his position in favor of his daughter, with whom he wanted to spend more time. He also carries old ties with Otose and Terada Tatsugorou, with the three of them being close friends in the past. Jirochou was initially believed to be the main antagonist of the Kabukicho Four Devas Arc, later revealed to be a major anti-hero at the end of the arc and eventual ally of Gintoki.

==== Pirako Doromizu ====
Voiced by: Ai Nonaka

Pirako Doromizu (泥水 平子, Doromizu Pirako) was first introduced as a hitokiri (aka manslayer) named Pirako Chin (椿 平子, Chin Pirako) trying to join the Yorozuya and Otose's "faction", but soon she was revealed to be the daughter of Doromizu Jirochou, and she had the intention of making him the lone ruler of Kabuki-chou. She played a central role in the 4 Devas arc and returned as a supporting ally.

==== Kintoki Sakata ====
Voiced by: Yuichi Nakamura; Asami Yaguchi (young)

Kintoki Sakata (坂田 金時, Sakata Kintoki) is the golden-haired, android alternate version of Gintoki, that Gengai created, because Kagura and Shinpachi were mad at Gintoki. Kintoki eventually hypnotized most of the residents into believing him to be the real Yorozuya leader, until Gintoki and Tama were able to undo his hypnosis and defeat him. Kintoki eventually returned as an ally to Gintoki.

==== Hajime Obi ====
Voiced by: Masaya Onosaka; Yū Sugimoto (young)

Hajime Obi (尾 美一, Obi Hajime) is the former head coach of the Koudoukan, thus an older brother-figure for Shinpachi and Tae. He was so talented, that he was chosen as a student to study in space. While leaving Earth he was caught up in an accident at the Terminal when a transfer device exploded. He was warped to Planet Biimu but half of his body was heavily damaged and he died. However he was revived by the native Amanto as a cyborg. Everybody assumed he had died but he was travelling around the Galaxy learning sword techniques and challenging opponents. He returns in the present day to the Shimura brothers, wielding a Beam Sword and with the nickname Obi-One. Eventually, his machine half took his body over and created the new personality Kenofi, and this half clashed with the Yorozuya and lead to Obi's demise.

=== Jouishishi (Katsura's Faction) ===
==== Kotaro Katsura ====
Voiced by: Akira Ishida, Yuki Kaida (young) (Japanese); Jason Kesser (first series), Illich Guardiola (The Movie), Matt Ellis (third series), Cathy Weseluck (young; third series) (English)
Portrayed by: Masaki Okada

Kotaro Katsura (桂 小太郎, Katsura Kotarō) is Gintoki's former comrade during the Joi war. Even after the Amanto take-over of Japan, Katsura continues to resist the Amanto and the Bakufu and has amassed a band of followers. Although he is an expert swordsman, his weapon of choice is a grenade. He is a wanted man due to his involvement in terrorist activities against the Bakufu, and was constantly on the run from the Shinsengumi.^{[ch. 6]} Although his initial methods were originally more violent in nature (for instance, sending a bomb to an Amanto embassy), Katsura has gradually grown to believe that there are people important to him in Edo, and decides that he no longer wants to destroy the country; nevertheless, he believes there should be a way to change it without sacrifices.^{[ch. 97]} In a past during the Joi-war when he and Takasugi are captured by Tendoshu, Gintoki comes to rescue them by getting himself captured. He needed to choose to either execute him and Takasugi, or their own teacher in front of their eyes. Katsura witnessed Gintoki's regret unlike Takasugi, who charged to kill Gintoki for choosing to execute their own teacher, ended up losing his left eye to Oboro. Katsura fully forgives Gintoki from the start, as it was already their teacher's wish for them to pass on his footsteps.

Since he is a wanted man, Katsura is often seen wearing disguises, although his identity is often still easily found out. One example of a disguise he seems to be fond of is a pirate's costume, complete with an eyepatch over his left eye and a scar on his right cheek, and using this he calls himself "Space Captain Katsura" (宇宙キャプテン・カツーラ, Uchū Kyaputen Katsura).^{[ch. 14]} Katsura sometimes works odd jobs to raise money for his terrorist activities.^{[ch. 50]}

As a common gag in the series, Katsura is often called "Zura" (ヅラ; In the first English volume, Gintoki calls him "Casserole," or "Cough syrup").^{[ch. 5]} which is the Japanese word for "wig". Katsura indignantly replies "It's not [name]! It's Katsura!" whenever he is called something other than his name, even if he is in disguise. There are variations such as "It's not rap! It's Katsu-rap, yo!" His name is based on the historical Katsura Kogoro. He is mentioned in the manga My Hero Academia by Kōhei Horikoshi during its first popularity arc.

==== Elizabeth ====
Voiced by: Shinji Takamatsu, Akira Kamiya (Final Chapter), Takayuki Yamada (live-action film) (Japanese); Andrew Love (The Movie) (English)

Elizabeth (エリザベス, Erizabesu) is Katsura's pet being a present from Katsura's former comrade, Tatsuma Sakamoto. He resembles a giant white duck or a giant penguin. Although many people consider Elizabeth to be insane and extraneous, Katsura has named the ambiguous avian "Elizabeth" and dotes on it.^{[ch. 20]} Elizabeth uses signboards to "communicate", as well as an occasional means of attack.^{[ch. 94]} Although the true identity of Elizabeth is uncertain, it appears to be a man-like Amanto wearing a duck costume. In its first appearance, hairy legs are seen underneath his sheet and the body of a humanoid with glowing eyes is revealed as his mouth is opened just as it fell during another battle between Gintoki and Katsura. Although Katsura seems shocked at what he really is, he subsequently remains by his side.^{[ch. 20]}^{[ch. 38]} In the Renho arc, it is revealed that Elizabeth's real name is General Eren of the Renho race, a race of mercenaries specialized in covert operations, and he, along with many Renho, act as pets for numerous Earthlings in order to prepare Earth for an invasion. In the end, it turns out he is only the "Monday's Elizabeth", with the real one having disappeared from a trip and brought back a souvenir for Katsura.

In various episodes from the anime, Elizabeth's true identity is often joked to be Shinji Takamatsu, the anime director of Gintama.

=== Shinsengumi ===
The Shinsengumi (真選組) are a special police task force working for the Bakufu to help quash remaining Joui (rebel) samurai left over from the war. It is based on the historical counterpart, the Shinsengumi. Initially, the Bakufu wished to establish the Roshigumi to enroll rural and rebellious youths to cut down on Joui recruit numbers as a test to see if they could be tamed into a police force. Due to the leadership of Isao Kondo, it succeeded, and thanks to Matsudaira and Sasaki Isaburo, it continued on to be an official police task force. Police Chief Matsudaira is its director, with Chief Commander Isao Kondo, Vice Chief Toshiro Hijikata and First Captain Sougo Okita in its membership. Due to the later conflict with the Tokugawa and Hitotsubashi factions, the Shinsengumi disbands, becomes an unofficial rebel force, and is later reinstated as a special police force.^{[ch. 525]}^{[ch. 529]}

==== Isao Kondo ====
Voiced by: Susumu Chiba, Sachi Kokuryu (young) (Japanese); Phil Dubois (first series), David Wald (The Movie), Jason Simpson (third series), Antony Kim (young; third series) (English)
Portrayed by: Nakamura Kankuro VI

Isao Kondo (近藤 勲, Kondō Isao) is the commander of the Shinsengumi. He is a bit goofy, but nevertheless good-natured and honorable. He takes his job seriously, and will not hesitate to sacrifice his life in order to protect the people.^{[ch. 15]} The members of the Shinsengumi are fiercely loyal to him, seeing as they revere him for being the one to give them back their swords after the Sword Prohibition Act.^{[ch. 9]} Shinsengumi Sougo Okita often remarks that Kondo's nice attitude is also his weak point as he never notices negative points about other people.^{[ch. 15]} Some characters in the series often call him "gorilla" and although he is angered with this nickname, he himself often adopts it.^{[ch. 8, 65]} He has a crush on Tae Shimura and throughout the series continuously stalks her, to which Tae responds with merciless beatings. His crush is predicated on the fact that Tae answered yes when he asked if she would accept a man with hairy buttocks (which Kondo has).^{[ch. 8]} Along the series, Kondo appears fully naked several times with his penis pixelized; Kondo becomes proud of this, noting that he ranked 15th in the character popularity poll from the manga despite how embarrassing this is.^{[ch. 267]}

After the Shogun Shige Shige's death, he and Matsudaira were sentenced to death, supposedly due to their failure to protect the Shogun. He and Matsudaira were then rescued by Katsura, whom they joined forces with to oppose the new regime led by Nobu Nobu. After the Mimawarigumi revealed their true loyalty was also to Shige Shige, later Sasaki's sacrifice to evacuate one of their allies to escape, Kondou mourns his death. In latter day after the Bakufu, which is currently led by Nobu Nobu revealed to be corrupted publicly after a yesterday's rebellion led by the alliance of Shinsengumi, Mimawarigumi and Joui, Kondou spent his short time with Shimura siblings before departing Edo with their Joui, Shinsengumi and Mimawarigumi allies since Shinsengumi is now a face of rebellion against a return of corrupted Bakufu, after what Tendoshu and Nobu Nobu did to Shige Shige.

Kondo's character and name are based on the historical Kondō Isami while his original design was a mix between Taizo Hasegawa and himself.

==== Toshiro Hijikata ====
Voiced by: Kazuya Nakai (Japanese); Travis Roig (first series), Blake Shepard (The Movie), Michael Adamthwaite (third series) (English)
Portrayed by: Yuuya Yagira

Toshiro Hijikata (土方 十四郎, Hijikata Toshirō) is the chain-smoking vice commander of the Shinsengumi. The brains behind the force, he takes his work seriously, and is fiercely loyal to his commander, Isao Kondo. Hijikata has a reputation as a ruthless fighter and strict leader, earning the nickname of "Demon Vice-Chief" (鬼の副長, Oni no Fukuchō). He is hot-tempered and often threatens his subordinates with seppuku.^{[ch. 9]} As a child, Hijikata was an illegitimate child born to a wealthy farmer in a village. His elder siblings shunned him due to this, but he was protected by his older brother Tamegoro Hijikata. A group of criminals attacked their house once. Tamegoro protected Hijikata, but the criminals cut his eyes out. Hijikata fought them in a trama-based fight response, only coming to after there was blood on the ground. Horrified by this violence, his family abandoned him. Hijikata then isolated himself from Tamegoro and his wife, living on the streets as a rogue samurai. He then joined a dojo led by the Kondo family and left for Edo with Isao Kondo.^{[ch. 116]}

Hijikata met Sougo Okita at the Kondo family dojo. Sougo often attempts to kill Hijikata so he can take over Hijikata's position as Vice-Commander as a recurring gag in the story. His animosity is fuelled by wanting revenge for attracting Kondo's attention, and for rejecting Okita's sister's feelings. Despite rejecting her, Hijikata did love Sougo's sister Mitsuba. He rejected her because his life as a samurai would only bring her harm. ^{[ch. 131]} Sougo and Hijikata have a squabbling sibling-like relationship.

Hijikata enjoys fighting and sees Gintoki as a rival in practically everything he does, from drinking contests to Rock-paper-scissors, ever since being defeated by him in battle.^{[ch. 17]} Contrary to his rivalry with Gintoki, both characters share many of the same traits, such as being afraid of ghosts and dentists. They are often explored as parallel characters with either similar or opposite views and experiences, such as during the Farewell Shinsengumi Arc.

Hijikata is obsessed with mayonnaise, and thus has the nickname "Mayorā" (マヨラー). He has been known to smother everything he eats under a mountain of mayonnaise, and he carries a number of objects shaped like mayonnaise bottles, such as his cigarette lighter. He was popular with girls until they discovered this obsession.^{[ch. 65]}

In the series, Hijikata receives a sword that is cursed with the spirit of a hikkikomori otaku nicknamed "Tosshi" (トッシー, Tosshī) who was murdered by his frustrated mother. The sword causes Hijikata to act like an otaku, and makes him behave in strange and cowardly ways.^{[ch. 160]} After a long inner struggle between the two, Tosshi disappears from Hijikata during a contest to decide which group will be Otsu's official fan club.^{[ch. 245]} Based on the historical Hijikata Toshizō, Hijikata was originally meant to be Gintama's main character, but with his appearance being identical to the one of Gintoki.

==== Sougo Okita ====
Voiced by: Kenichi Suzumura, Nami Okamoto (young) (Japanese); Christian Vandepas (first series), Clint Bickham (The Movie), Vincent Tong (third series) (English)
Portrayed by: Ryo Yoshizawa

Sougo Okita (沖田 総悟, Okita Sougo) is the best swordsman in the Shinsengumi. Although he is a master of kenjutsu, he frequently uses a bazooka.^{[ch. 6]} He tends to be light-hearted and somewhat childish, though his speech is heavily deadpan. In comparison to Hijikata, Okita is very lazy when it comes to his job as he is often seen taking naps when he is supposed to work.^{[ch. 5]} He is also known as a sadist, being highly skilled in torturing people without caring if it is somebody he knows. He also has a childlike or teenage appearance.^{[ch. 65]}

Okita displays an annoyance and dislike of Toshiro Hijikata, and continuously tries to heavily wound, embarrass, or even kill him whenever he has the chance in order to take his rank of vice-commander. Losing his parents at a young age, he was raised by his sister, Mitsuba. Consequently, despite his sadistic personality, Okita adores his sister and does everything he can to please her.^{[ch. 129]} He is also very fond of Isao Kondo, who took him under his wings when he was little. It is due to the fact Mitsuba was rejected by Hijikata and that Kondo became very interested in Hijikata that Okita hates Hijikata.^{[ch. 130]} Nonetheless, Okita still thinks of him as one of his three friends. Okita also regards Gintoki, whom he addresses as "boss" or "Master Gin", as one of his friends (with the other being Kondo) with the two finding common grounds in torturing and humiliating Hijikata.^{[ch. 131]} He is also a rival of Kagura following an unfinished rock-paper-scissors duel, and he usually calls her "China".^{[ch. 23]}

In the original Japanese manga he likes to end his sentences in '~desaa' and "~desuzee'. Sorachi originally designed Okita as a female, and wielding an umbrella, but had to change it to a male since only men are allowed in the Shinsengumi. His name is based on the historical Okita Sōji.

==== Katakuriko Matsudaira ====
Voiced by: Norio Wakamoto (Japanese); Kyle C. Jones (The Movie), John Novak (third series) (English)
Portrayed by: Shinichi Tsutsumi

Katakuriko Matsudaira (松平 片栗虎) is the director of the police department and he is also in charge of the Shinsengumi and the immediate superior of Commander Isao Kondou. He has extremely violent tendencies, often seen wielding a pistol, or occasionally heavier weapons. He also believes that people who wear sunglasses are usually assassins, even though he himself wears them. He believes in other abnormal things such as righteousness is what makes up 80% of old men and the police being not more than a group of mafia community. He is also extremely protective of his daughter, Kuriko, recruiting the Shinsengumi to carry out a hit against his daughter's boyfriend. He is also a party-person and gets lewd when he is drunk. His character is loosely based on the historical figure Matsudaira Katamori.

==== Sagaru Yamazaki ====
Voiced by: Tetsuhara Ota (Japanese); Clint Bickham (The Movie), Adrian Petriw (third series) (English)
Portrayed by: Junki Tozuka

Sagaru Yamazaki (山崎 退, Yamazaki Sagaru) is a spy, whose specialty is naturally gathering intelligence. Formerly a street punk, Yamazaki is often caught by Hijikata playing badminton by himself during the time he should work, and he is subsequently beaten.^{[ch. 15]} Sorachi commented that he has no plans in explaining this gag since if he does it, "it'll ruin the joke". Across the series, Yamazaki becomes obsessed with eating anpan, sometimes taking it as almost an addiction. Despite having a rivalry with Shinpachi Shimura, they most often see eye-to-eye out of their respective groups.^{[ch. 17]} He is often seen cosplaying as a badminton-playing version of Ryoma Echizen from The Prince of Tennis. His character is based on Shinsengumi's historical figure Yamazaki Susumu.

==== Kamotaro Ito ====
Voiced by: Mitsuaki Madono, Misaki Sekiyami (young)
Portrayed by: Haruma Miura

Kamotaro Ito (伊東 鴨太郎, Itō Kamotarō) is an advisor to the Shinsengumi who is later revealed to be a traitor whose ambitions of desiring to be recognized were used by Shinsuke Takasugi in an attempt to destroy the group from the inside. Unknown to Ito, he was merely being used as a sacrificial lamb by Takasugi, who never had any intention of letting Ito join the Kiheitai. As a child, Itou was neglected by his family for being a second born not worthy to be an heir despite his gifted nature, and by classmates jealous of his talents. As such, Itou grew to be cynical towards everyone.^{[ch. 165]} He considers himself a rival to Toshiro Hijikata and manages to get him suspended from the Shinsengumi, later attempting to assassinate Isao Kondo.^{[ch. 138]}^{[ch. 139]} However, his plan is foiled by the members of the Shinsengumi and Yorozuya. After losing his left arm and being defeated by Hijikata, he begins to realize how important the bonds he formed in the Shinsengumi were to him and how foolish it was of him to try and betray his dear friends.^{[ch. 165]} He is allowed to have one last duel with his old rival, in his weakened state and is allowed to die as a friend and a warrior.^{[ch. 168]} His name and role are loosely based on Ito Kashitaro.

==== Tetsunosuke Sasaki ====
Voiced by: Kentarō Itō

Tetsunosuke Sasaki (佐々木 鉄之助, Sasaki Tetsunosuke) is Vice-Captain Hijikata's assistant and Isaburo Sasaki's half brother. Although he is chubby and shy, he is helpful and supportive, as well as an avid rap fan, becoming part of the rap group Check it Out Gang. He has a strained relationship with his half-brother, but wants to connect with him. Tetsunosuke gets his name from a combination of two persons related to Hijikata in real life: Tetsunosuke Ichimura, who was a member of the Shinsengumi and Hijikata's page and Kuranosuke Sasaki, who was a part of Hijikata's unit and took part in the Ikedaya Incident.

==== Shimaru Saitou ====
Voiced by: Takahiro Sakurai (Japanese); Brad Swaile (English)

Shimaru Saitou (斉 藤終, Saitō Shimaru) is the captain of the Third Division of the Shinsengumi. He has bright orange hair, in an afro style. He is reluctant when it comes to speaking with others and extremely shy. He is known to be taciturn, to the extent that no one has ever heard his voice or heard him speak before, until Katsura went undercover in the Shinsengumi. He also has an ongoing rivalry with Elizabeth, due to both of them tending not to speak out loud, but with signs. He is also able to sleep in virtually any situation. His name was inspired by the real life 3rd Division captain of the Shinsengumi, Saitō Hajime.

=== Iga Ninjas ===
The Iga clan of ninjas support the shogunate. The Oniwabanshuu were a small group of Iga ninja tasked with being the shogun's special forces, created during the early Tokugawa shogunate. Their duties include protecting the shogun and his family, information gathering, and assassinations. They had replaced the Tenshouin Naraku as the shogun Shigeshige's go to during this period, due to the latter's ties to Ayame and Zenzo from his childhood.

==== Ayame Sarutobi ====
Voiced by: Yū Kobayashi (Japanese); Jehane Serralles (first series), Carli Mosier (The Movie), Nicole Bouma (third series) (English)
Portrayed by: Natsuna Watanabe

Ayame Sarutobi (猿飛 あやめ, Sarutobi Ayame) is kunoichi nicknamed Sa-chan from the Oniwabanshū. She meets Gintoki when she falls through his roof. When she tries to convince him that he had inappropriate relations with her, he briefly plays along despite knowing that she was lying to get his help. Ever since that incident, she has become infatuated with him, much to his exasperation.^{[ch. 40]} Her feelings for him seem to be encouraged, as she enjoys being put down and threatened by him, due to her extreme masochism.^{[ch. 67]} She often follows Gintoki and the rest of the Yoroyuza around much to his knowledge, throwing objects at her to come out when he needs her help. However, as the manga continues, Sa-chan appears less frequently in the series which tends to irritate her. She is extremely skilled as a ninja and acted as shoguns royal guard. She is severely short-sighted and often loses her glasses. Her attacks are mostly based on natto and bondage. Her name is based on the historical Sarutobi Sasuke.

==== Zenzo Hattori ====
Voiced by: Keiji Fujiwara, Toshiyuki Morikawa (The Very Final) (Japanese); Motoko Kumai (English)

Zenzo Hattori (服部 全蔵, Hattori Zenzō) is a highly skilled ninja who sports a light-brown/dark-blonde mop top and a goatee. Initially introduced as a cloaked ninja assisting in the fraudulent "Dreamcatcher" scheme, his first notable appearance is when he and Gintoki attempt to fight to the death over the last remaining issue of a Christmas Double Issue Akamaru Jump believing it to be a Shonen Jump.^{[ch. 53]} He was originally a member of the Oniwabanshū. He is the only character in the series to equal Gintoki's obsessive devotion to Jump. He apparently suffers from piles, which is often joked about. He commands a freelance ninja team known as the "Shinobi 5." His father is said to be the strongest man in the Oniwabanshū, and an instructor to many of his peers, including Ayame Sarutobi. His character is based on historical figure Hattori Hanzō.

==== Jiraia ====
Voiced by: Yusaku Yara

Jiraia the Spider (蜘蛛手の地雷亜, Kumode no Jiraiya) (real name Danzou Tobita (鳶田 段蔵, Tobita Danzou)) is a former member from the Oniwabanshu as well as Tsukuyo's teacher. He was born in the country side to Iga Samurai, and had a talent for ninjutsu since he was a kid. During a fight, his family was destroyed and only Danzou and his sister survived. In order to protect his sister, Danzou had to work under the people he hated. Her sister, knowing that she was the problem, threw herself from a cliff. Jiraia burned his face and lived a life in solitude. He tried to kill the Shogun, but Hattori's father stopped him. In the end, to stop his pain, he decided to get killed by someone who resembles him. So he raised a student, Tsukuyo, and taught her everything he knew. So Jiraia came back to Yoshiwara to take Tsukuyo. He burned Tsukuyo's other weakness, Yoshiwara. But thanks to Shinpachi, Kagura, Hattori and Hinowa, the fire was extinguished. Gintoki went to save Tsukuyo from Jiraia, and the fight began. Jiraia was defeated by Gintoki, but when he tries to stab Gintoki from behind, he is stopped by Tsukuyo, like he wanted. He was the strongest man in the Oniwabanshu, and the one who created the Hyakka.

==== Gaimon Fujibayashi ====
Voiced by: Hiroshi Shirokuma (Japanese); Jason Simpson (English)

Gaimon Fujibayashi (藤林 鎧門, Fujibayashi Gaimon) is the large and burly leader of Fujibayashi family, and one of three Iga leaders along with Rappa Momochi, and Zenzou Hattori.

==== Rappa Momochi ====
Voiced by: Rina Satō (Japanese); Maryke Hendrikse (English)

Rappa Momochi (百地 乱破, Momochi Rappa) is the leader of the Momochi family affiliated with the Iga clan, who uses humanoid puppets in combat. She fools people into thinking that she is the bandaged person with a handmaid pushing her in a wheelchair, but she is in-fact disguised as the maid and the weapon-bound puppet is carried around by her in the wheelchair.

==== Wakikaoru ====
Voiced by: Satomi Arai (Japanese); Jaimie Mortimer-Lamb (English)

Wakikaoru (脇薫) is a freelancer ninja currently working in the Shinobi 5 as a follower of Hattori Zenzou.

=== Kiheitai ===
The Kiheitai (鬼兵隊; Demon Soldiers Army) is secret volunteer army amidst the Jōi faction led by Shinsuke Takasugi. In existence since the war with the Amanto, they remain the only section who remain devoted to the original mission of violently freeing Japan from the grip of invaders, whether it be by the recruitment of soldiers or the development of weaponry that would destroy those who face them. The actions of Takasugi and the Kiheitai was once antagonize those who either have come to terms or who have blended in with the new society such as Gintoki or Katsura, until revealed to be a set by Tendoshu to kill Shige Shige and replaced by Nobu Nobu, Kiheitai will play most important supportive role in upcoming Boshin War. This is based on the historical counterpart, the Kiheitai.

==== Shinsuke Takasugi ====
Voiced by: Takehito Koyasu, Houko Kuwashima (Japanese); Donald Guzzi (first series), Kyle C. Jones (The Movie), Alex Zahara (third series), Kathleen Barr (young; third series) (English)
Portrayed by: Tsuyoshi Domoto

Shinsuke Takasugi (高杉 晋助, Takasugi Shinsuke) is a former comrade of Gintoki Sakata and Kotaro Katsura during the Amanto invasion, and originally a major antagonist throughout the series until the near end of Shogun Assassination arc. He leads a radical Joi faction called the Kiheitai and is known amongst the Shinsengumi as one of the most radical and fearsome of the Joi. He is easily recognisable through his bandaged left eye, his colorful kimono, his eerie smile, and the pipe he is often seen smoking. He is a very proficient swordsman, being a perfect equal to Gintoki due to them clashing ever since they were kids. After the war ended, he vanished, and has since gained a dangerous reputation due to his assassinations of many of the Bakufu's main officers and his planning of a large-scale coup d'état.^{[ch. 29]} It was revealed when both of him and Katsura are captured, and when Gintoki is forced to choose to execute him and Katsura or Shoyo, that Takasugi lost his left eye when Oboro stabbed it, an eye that, in its final moment, witnessed Gintoki being forced to execute their teacher. Trapped in that memory, Takasugi couldn't see Gintoki's regret or pain, and for years, he directed his hatred toward the "White Yaksha". It wasn't until much later that he realized it had been their teacher's wish to pass his will on to them, and in remembering how he lost his eye, Takasugi finally began to understand and reconcile with Gintoki.

Unlike Katsura, he is not interested in saving the country: rather, he believes that the only way to save it is to destroy the "rotten" post-Joi war world. He is particularly resentful about this, as he claims that it has stolen their teacher - Shoyo Yoshida, who instructed him, Katsura, and Gintoki on the ways of the samurai - away from them. His antagonism with them drove him to make dealings with the space pirates Harusame in order to drive them off, offering Gintoki and Katsura's heads as the "ticket" to join.^{[ch. 97]} Sorachi himself mentioned in the character formula book that he "hates change", which provides another reason for his hatred of the changes that the Amanto brought about. His name is based on the historical Takasugi Shinsaku.

==== Bansai Kawakami ====
Voiced by: Takumi Yamazaki (Japanese); Andrew Love (The Movie), Paul Dobson (English) (third series)
Portrayed by: Masataka Kubota

Bansai Kawakami (河上 万斉, Kawakami Bansai) is one of the strongest swordsmen of the Kiheitai and the "right-hand man" of Takasugi. Bansai carries a shamisen and is skilled at playing it; it also doubles as a tool for tying others up or as a weapon similar to a garrote, and he carries his hidden katana inside it.

On top of being famous as a skilled swordsman, Bansai is also a talented songwriter. He works as a music producer under the name "Tsunpo" (つんぽ), and Otsu's newer songs are written by him. Overall, Bansai is shown to have an extremely calm demeanor, although he is capable of violence when necessary and appears to take an interest in potential challenges to his skill. He has a strong sense of duty, and as such accomplishes the orders given to him by Takasugi- however, he is shown to interpret and carry them out based on his own values. He admires strength and spirit in others, and it was on this basis that he spares Yamazaki's life when Itou leaves him to finish him off. He speaks in the Japanese humble manner by using "de gozaru" at the end of the sentences and referring to himself as "sessha," a notably antiquated way of speaking. Despite this, he seems to use modern language when in his "Tsunpo" role. His name is based on the historical Kawakami Gensai, one of the four most notable assassins of the Bakumatsu period.

==== Henpeita Takechi ====
Voiced by: Chafurin (Japanese); George Manley (The Movie); Ron Halder (third series) (English)
Portrayed by: Jiro Sato

Henpeita Takechi (武市 変平太, Takechi Henpeita) is the strategist of the Kiheitai. He uses a sword, but is not very skilled with it and gets fatigued quickly as seen when he fights Shinpachi during the Benizakura arc. He's often accused of being a lolicon, but he claims that he's a feminist. His name is based on the historical Takechi Hanpeita.

==== Matako Kijima ====
Voiced by: Risa Hayamizu (Japanese); Carli Mosier (The Movie), Venus Terzo (third series) (English)
Portrayed by: Nanao

Matako Kijima (来島 また子, Kijima Matako), known as the Red Bullet (紅い弾丸, Akai Dangan), is the only female member of the Kiheitai and is skilled in using a pair of revolvers. She is fiercely loyal to Takasugi. She is quick-tempered and prone to screeching when she's upset. This is evident when she has a "spitting fight" with Kagura after she spat at her and when she starts yelling at Kagura after her underwear is said to be stained. She interacts the most with Takechi, the schemer of the Kihetai, calling him "senpai" out of respect, but also calling him a "pervert" and a "lolicon" for sparing Kagura instead of killing her. In chapter 294 of the manga, she, Takechi, and Bansai send Gin a New Years card in order to receive more screen time. Her name is based on the historical Kijima Matabei.

==== Nizo Okada ====
Voiced by: Yutaka Aoyama (Japanese); Jay Hickman (The Movie) (English)
Portrayed by: Hirofumi Arai

Nizo Okada (岡田 似蔵, Okada Nizō), known as the "Butcher", is a blind hitokiri working for Takasugi. He seeks to destroy everything in the world, similar to Takasugi. His level of swordsmanship is such that he can slash an opponent without the latter seeing him unsheathing his sword. However, Nizou's sword was broken by Gintoki during their initial encounter. Recruited by Shinsuke, Nizo gains a new weapon, the high-tech bio-mechanical katana, "Benizakura" (紅桜; literally meaning "Crimson Cherry Blossom", "Cherryblossom" in the English dub), crafted by Tetsuya Murata and used the weapon on various ronin to improve it with Katsura and Gintoki the only ones to survive him as he loses his arm to Shinpachi during his attack on the latter swordsman. However, having fire power equal to ten battleships and advance AI, Benizakura slowly taking over Okada's body, turning him into a bloodthirsty cyborg before he is eventually defeated by Gintoki. Though his fate is unknown, he is assumed deceased due to the effects of the Benizakura. His name is based on the historical Okada Izō, one of the four most notable assassins of the Bakumatsu period.

=== Mimawarigumi ===
The Mimawarigumi (見廻組) is an elite unit composed of high-ranking samurais rivaling the Shinsengumi who consist of ronin.

==== Isaburou Sasaki ====
Voiced by: Toshiyuki Morikawa (Japanese); Fred Henderson (English)

Isaburou Sasaki (佐々木 異三郎, Sasaki Isaburo) is the commander of the Mimawarigumi as well as the heir of the Sasaki family who likes communicating with others through cellphone. He is skilled using both a sword and a gun. In the past, Sasaki's family was killed by the Naraku faction of Tendoshuu. His name is based on the historical figure Tadasaburō Sasaki, a member of the Kyoto Mimawarigumi.

==== Nobume Imai ====
Voiced by: Aya Hirano (Japanese); Chiara Zanni (English)

Nobume Imai (今井 信女, Imai Nobume) is the vice-commander of the Mimawarigumi, a quiet yet sadistic assassin who often rivals Shinsengumi's Sougo Okita. Her sword skills are seemingly higher than Kyubei and has been described by Kondo as comparable to a grim reaper. As a child, she was originally known as Mukuro (骸) and worked for the assassination group Naraku alongside Oboro, where she was the second strongest in the Three Wings of Naraku. Her name is based on the historical figure Noburō Imai, a member of the Kyoto Mimawarigumi.

=== Yagyu Family ===
A noble family of great samurai that serves the current Shogun.

==== Kyubei Yagyu ====
Voiced by: Fumiko Orikasa (Japanese); Brittney Karbowski (The Movie), Advah Soudack (third series) (English)

Kyubei Yagyu (柳生 九兵衛, Yagyū Kyūbei) is an aristocratic young lady who was brought up as a male in order to succeed her family's clan. She dresses and behaves like a boy due to her upbringing, but occasionally shows her more feminine side. These facts cause several characters to mistake her as a boy during her first appearance.^{[ch. 120]} She was close friends with Tae Shimura when they were children where she fell in love with her, and lost her left eye protecting her when they were young. As a result of this incident, Kyubei wears an eye-patch across her left eye. The incident also left her with the determination to make herself stronger, and for many years she was training hard to improve her skills.

When she returned shortly before her appearance, she has already mastered the Yagyū-Ryū sword technique, becoming the second strongest member from her clan below her grandfather.^{[ch. 110]} She tries to keep her promise to protect Tae by marrying her but the Yorozuya and Shinsengumi defeat the Yagyu, claiming Tae's freedom.^{[ch. 122]} In the aftermath Kyubei realizes she herself is still weak and decides to keep training to become stronger.^{[ch. 123]} However, Kyubei is still insecure of her gender to the point she overreacts every time she touches a man.^{[ch. 139]} Kyubei's name is based on the historical figure Yagyū Jūbei.

==== Binbokusai Yagyu ====
Voiced by: Naoki Tatsuta (Japanese); Brian Drummond (English)

Binbokusai Yagyu (柳生 敏木斎, Yagyū Binbokusai) is Kyubei's protective grandfather and sword master, and the grand patriarch of the Yagyū Family. He is a very short, elderly man, but is also still a skilled warrior.

==== Ayumu Tojo ====
Voiced by: Kōji Yusa (Japanese); Blake Shepard (The Movie), Brendan Hunter (third series) (English)

Ayumu Tojo (東城 歩, Tōjō Ayumu) is Kyubei's servant, who is extremely dedicated in his concern for his young master. He is a skilled samurai and the leader of the Yagyu Heavenly Four. He generally speaks in a very polite manner, using -masu and -desu instead of the short dictionary forms usually employed in a normal male-speech. He addresses Kyubei young master, and has for years kept a diary recording Kyubei's activities.^{[ch. 138]} Kyubei is usually indifferent to Tojo's excessive attention, although she is often violent towards him.^{[ch. 138]} Tojo's eyes are normally closed unless he is surprised or under emotional distress. His name is a reference to the character Aya Tojo from the series Strawberry 100%.

==== Koshinori Yagyu ====
Voiced by: Takaya Kuroda

Koshinori Yagyu (柳生 敏木斎, Yagyū Koshinori) is Binbokusai's son and Kyubei's overprotective father. When Koshinori's wife died after she gave birth to Kyubei, some clan members urged him to remarry to have a male heir, but he refused, out of his deep love for his late wife. He feared that if he remarried and had a son, Kyubei would lose her position in the family, so he decided to hide Kyubei's gender from everybody and had her trained to be the rightful heir to the family as a boy.

==== Sui Minamito ====
Voiced by: Hikaru Midorikawa

Sui Minamito (南戸 粋, Minamito Sui) is a skilled warrior and member of the Yagyu Heavenly Four. He is a vain and self-conscious man, who continuously seeks to prove his worth.

==== Itsuki Kitaoji ====
Voiced by: Kenji Hamada

Itsuki Kitaoji (北大路 斎, Kitaouji Itsuki) is a focused and serious warrior and member of the Yagyu Heavenly Four. He isn't the type to fight by instincts, instead planning his attacks, being more of a thinking swordsman. He also show some fanaticism towards ketchup, being almost on par with Hijikata's mayonnaise addiction.

==== Tsukamu Nishino ====
Voiced by: Yoshinori Sonobe

Tsukamu Nishino (西野 掴, Nishino Tsukamu) is a large and bald Samurai with immense physical strength and a member of the Yagyu Heavenly Four.

=== Shogunate ===
Bakufu, or Shogunate (将軍職, Shougunshoku, The General's Post), is the central government in Japan. Originally the national military force under the control of the Japanese Emperor, they, led by the Shogun, ended up gradually ruling the entire country starting from the late 12th century. In the Gintama universe, the shogunate becomes a recurring influence to the many characters in the series.

==== Shigeshige Tokugawa ====
Voiced by: Yūki Ono, Eriko Matsui (young) (Japanese); Lucas Gilbertson (third series), Riley Kramer (young; third series) (English)
Portrayed by: Ryo Katsuji

Shigeshige Tokugawa (徳川 茂茂, Tokugawa Shigeshige) is the Shogun of Edo. He rules Edo with assistance from the former Shogun and his uncle, Sadasada Tokugawa, whose crimes against Bakufu officers lead Shigeshige to nearly resign in order to stop him. Despite his good-natured personality and position, the Shogun is frequently mistreated by several of the series' characters with the Shinsengumi also failing to protect him. He also has a younger sister named Soyo Tokugawa, who is friends with Kagura. The real Shigeshige was revealed to be hiding in Oniwabanshuu, while the Shigeshige from before was a double, as well as revealing his childhood being raised and trained by the ninja clan, and has a scar on his back. He died in his sister's arms at night after being poisoned by an assassin. His name is based on the historical Tokugawa Iemochi.

==== Soyo Tokugawa ====
Voiced by: Ryō Hirohashi (Japanese); Caitlynne Medrek; Juliet Simmons (The Very Final) (English)

Soyo Tokugawa (徳川 そよ, Tokugawa Soyo), also known as Princess Soyo, is the kind younger sister of Shigeshige and one of Kagura's closest friends.

==== Sadasada Tokugawa ====
Voiced by: Takaya Hashi (Japanese); Michael Dobson (English)

Sadasada Tokugawa (徳川 定々, Tokugawa Sadasada), is the former 13th generation Shogun of Edo. He is also the uncle and advisor to Shigeshige and Soyo, who secretly still holds a lot of power and is supported by the Tendoshuu, who provided the Naraku assassins for him to use.

==== Nobunobu Hitotsubashi ====
Voiced by: Daisuke Namikawa (Japanese); Giles Panton (English)

Nobunobu Hitotsubashi (一橋 喜々, Hitotsubashi Nobunobu), is the selfish and arrogant head of the Hitotsubashi Faction, who is supported by the Tendoshuu and is elected as a puppet shogun for them, under the name of Nobunobu Tokugawa (徳川 喜々, Tokugawa Nobunobu). During his interactions with Katsura, Sakamoto, the Yorozuya and Shigeshige, he changes for the better.

==== Maizou Rotten ====
Voiced by: Shigeru Chiba; Eiichirou Tokumoto (younger) (Japanese); Ken Kramer (English)

Maizou Rotten (六転 舞蔵, Rotten Maizou), is a retainer of the shogun's family and close advisor to Shigeshige and Soyo, who had a secret relationship with a popular courtesan named Suzuran in the Yoshiwara district.

=== Yoshiwara ===
An underground red light district in Edo, sealed away by a metal ceiling that was created to protect the district from the Amanto Invasion.

==== Tsukuyo ====
Voiced by: Yūko Kaida Marlie Collins (third series)

Tsukuyo (月詠) is a blonde-haired woman with a scar over her forehead and left cheek. She leads an all female group of assassins, the Hyakka (Blooms of Yoshiwara), deployed by the Night King Hosen. Despite appearing to be a heartless person when approached by Odd Jobs, throwing a fake kunai to their foreheads, she later becomes friends with them. She has a difficult past being orphaned as a child, and raised by a ruthless and deadly assassin, Jiraia. While the original motive for Jiraia was to instill every bit of despair and tragedy of his own life into Tsukuyo, of who he refers to as his art or perfect creation, Tsukuyo ended up growing attached to what he did not manage to do. That is "Friends, A Home, and Precious Things To Protect" as told by Jiraia.

Her loyalty and home lies with Hinowa in the underground city of Yoshiwara. She has ties with Hinowa, who also helped raise her like an older sister/mother through her childhood. She has an extremely poor tolerance of alcohol and will get drunk quickly after drinking only a little. When working with Gintoki's group, Tsukuyo becomes more carefree and develops feelings for Gintoki, though she is reluctant to admit it.

==== Housen ====
Voiced by: Banjo Ginga

Housen (鳳仙, Housen), also known as Night King (夜王, Ya-ou) of Yoshiwara Paradise, was the ruler of Yoshiwara, a former Captain of the Seventh Division within the Harusame Space Pirates and Kamui's mentor. His title, "King of the Night", did not solely come from him being the ruler of Yoshiwara, the land of eternal night, but also from being known as "King of the Yato", an Amanto tribe that is averse to sunlight. Even amongst the dozens of powerhouses within the Yato tribe, the King of the Night was a powerful figure who built his own army. He is of comparable strength to Umibouzu, the most powerful alien hunter in the universe, one of the few who opposed Housen. Housen was eventually defeated by Gintoki, albeit with the help of sunlight and the Yoshiwara guards.

==== Hinowa ====
Voiced by: Tomo Sakurai (Episode 139-278); Kikuko Inoue (From 343); Mayako Nigo (young) (Japanese); Kelly Sheridan (English)

Hinowa (日輪), also known as The Sun of Yoshiwara (吉原の太陽), and Yoshiwara Paradise's (吉原桃源郷) is the highest ranking courtesan and de facto leader of Yoshiwara, as well as Seita's adoptive mother. In order to keep her for himself, Housen had her ankle tendons slashed, so she could not run away with Seita.

==== Seita ====
Voiced by: Yūko Sanpei (Japanese); Advah Soudack (English)

Seita (晴太) is the adopted son of Hinowa and the biological son of a courtesan of Yoshiwara, who died after giving birth. As a baby, he was led to the outside world in the care of an old man by Hinowa. Barely scraping by on the streets, Gintoki finds him and takes him to Otose's, where they learn he was stealing from others, so he could have enough money to buy Hinowa out from Housen. Inspired, the Yorozuya helps him in this and they become allies.

==== Suzuran ====
Voiced by: Teiyū Ichiryūsai; Yumi Uchiyama (young)

Suzuran (鈴蘭), also known as The Courtesan Of The Heavens, is an elderly and sickly courtesan, who was the highest ranking courtesan and of Yoshiwara decades prior, who had a run-in with the shogun of the time, Sadasada Tokugawa and a loving tryst with Rotten.

=== Harusame ===
The Spring Shark (春雨, Harusame) Space Pirates is the largest Amanto crime syndicate in the universe involved in many illicit dealings within the galaxy and they hold considerable influence in Japan as well.

==== Kamui ====
Voiced by: Satoshi Hino (Japanese); Christopher Ayres (The Movie), Ryan Luhning (third series) (English)

Kamui (神威) is Kagura's older brother. He is the leader of the space pirates Harusame's 7th Division, but he later becomes the admiral and teams up with Shinsuke Takasugi. He left his family after challenging his father and managing to cut off his left arm.^{[ch. 63]}. Although he usually shows a cheerful face, he is in fact a violent fighter who lusts for blood, like the majority of the Yato clan.^{[ch. 214]} He states his relatives are weaker than him for becoming attached to other people. However, he starts showing great interest in Gintoki's skills after he defeats his former superior, Housen, claiming him as his prey.^{[ch. 227]}

==== Abuto ====
Voiced by: Hōchū Ōtsuka (Japanese); Kyle C. Jones (The Movie), John Swasey (The Very Final) (English)

Abuto (阿伏兎) is the second-in-command of the 7th Division of Harusame's Thunder Guns, the most powerful combat unit under Kamui's leadership. He is a powerful, calm and easy-going Yato, who is also a skilled combatant when needed.

==== Kada ====
Voiced by: Miki Itō

Kada (華陀), also known as Peacock Princess Kada (孔雀姫 華陀, Kujaku Hime Kada), is an Amanto of the Shinra Tribe and one of the 4 Devas of the Kabuki District, and secretly the captain of the 4th Division of the Harusame Space Pirates, who was the mastermind that everyone believed Jirochou to be.

==== Batou Pluto ====
Voiced by: Tomokazu Seki

Batou Pluto (冥王星馬董, Meiousei Batou) is the captain of the 2nd Division of the Harusame pirates. Known as the best swordsman in Harusame with the title "The Star Sword King," he was said to be able to rival Kamui with a sword in his hand. He is also responsible for giving Tatsuma the injury that permanently ended his ability to fight with a sword. He faces off against Gintoki on the planet Rakuyo, who defeats him and recruits him as an ally.

==== Hankai Uranus ====
Voiced by: Kazuhiro Yamaji

Hankai Uranus (天王星范堺, Ten'ousei Hankai) is the captain and only member of the 3rd Division of the Harusame pirates. Known for his manipulation skills and trickery. He is also a cyborg, that is more machine than human, allowing him to easily hack technology.

==== Shokaku Neptune ====
Voiced by: Rikiya Koyama

Shokaku Neptune (海王星猩覺, Kaiousei Shoukaku) is the leader of the 4th Division of the Harusame pirates, after the defeat of former captain Kujaku Hime Kada. He is the strongest and most athletic of the organization and a vicious fighter. After facing off against Katsura on the planet Rakuyo, he is defeated but Katsura earns his respect and help.

==== Ungyou ====
Voiced by: Shigeo Kiyama

Ungyou (云業, Ungyō) is a large and intimidating member of the Yato Tribe and a member of the Harusame's 7th Division, who goes to Yoshiwara with Kamui and Abuto to retrieve Housen.

==== Daraku ====
Voiced by: Ryūsei Nakao

Daraku (陀絡) is a low-level member of the Harusame, who runs a group that peddles highly addictive drugs made from plants found only in remote faraway planets called Tenseikyou (転生郷) to earth inhabitants. He is able to carry on his trade with impunity due to his close ties with the shogunate.

=== Tenshouin Naraku ===
Shining Heavens School of Hell (天照院 奈洛, Tenshōin Naraku) is a secret assassination group founded by Utsuro that works together with the Tendoshuu behind the scenes of the Shogunate. They consist of lawless people or orphans that were thrown out from society and were taken in by the group and trained. The Naraku has been known so far to be the most common enemy force that Gintoki and his allies have fought against starting from the Courtesan of a Nation Arc.

==== Utsuro ====
Voiced by: Koichi Yamadera (Japanese); Adam Gibbs (The Movie), Simon Hayama (third series) (English)

Utsuro (虚, Utsuro) is the true main antagonist in Gintama series, and was the founder and first leader of the Tenshouin Naraku before Oboro took his position. He is the original identity and self of Shōyō Yoshida (吉田 松陽, Yoshida Shōyō) (based on the historical Yoshida Shōin) and now part of the Tendoshu. As a result of experiencing many deaths, Utsuro is shown to be emotionless, even fearless. His longing for death is shown in every appearance, and even though he is immortal, knowing that Kouka, who was immortal as well, died in the end, gave him a little hope. The only thing that awakens his interest is an opponent who seems to be able to kill him, just like Umibouzu. Utsuro is the personification of his name, for even Batou couldn't read his mind at all, since it seemed like an empty, unreadable vessel. As his former good-half Shōyō revived in a different new body, in the present day for two years after the first round of Battle of Earth, Utsuro begin to possess Takasugi's body at time of Shōyō's revival. Unfortunately, Takasugi, helped by the late-Oboro's spirit weakens Utsuro via seppuku from killing the recently revived Shōyō for Gintoki to finish Utsuro once and for all, at cost of Takasugi's sacrifice.

==== Oboro ====
Voiced by: Kazuhiko Inoue, Aoi Yūki (young) (Japanese); Hiro Kanagawa (English)

Oboro (朧) is the leader of the Tensho School during the absence of the founder, Utsuro, and also the strongest assassin within the organization's Three Wings of Naraku. Oboro is a very serious person, not easily falling for others' words, and is shown to be calm in both fights and conversations. He speaks with an allegory tone, and he refers to Gintoki, Takasugi and Katsura as the demons who howl at the heavens (a term referring to the Tendoushuu), due to them being Yoshida Shouyou's students. He is completely loyal to Utsuro, due to the former Naraku leader saving his life in the past, and considered himself to be his disciple.

==== Hitsugi ====
Voiced by: Masashi Sugawara (Japanese); Steve Fenley (English)

Hitsugi (朧) is the third and last of the Three Wings of Naraku. He is a skilled and devoted assassin, and a man of few words. He crosses blades Gintoki in the Silver Soul arc, when he loses his arm. Two years later, he faces off against Katsura in order to retrieve Utsuro's heart.

=== Altana Liberation Army ===
The Altana Liberation Army was a military alliance formed to end the Tendoshuu, which they believed were monopolizing the universe's Altana reserves for their own personal gain and which had orchestrated the destruction of seven entire planets. The alliance consisted of the surviving populations of these planets, which were annihilated when their respective Altana Gates went out of control. The main members of the organization are the Yato, Dakini and Shinra tribe.

==== Shijaku ====
Voiced by: Kenjiro Tsuda

Shijaku (紫雀) is the wise and considerate co-leader of the Altana Liberation Army. His real name is Barkas and he is one of the three princes of planet Oukoku, the other being his younger brother Prince Hata, and his long-lost older brother Dragonia.

==== Ensho ====
Voiced by: Yuichiro Umehara (Silver Soul part 1), Tomoaki Maeno (Silver Soul part 2)

Ensho (圓翔, Enshou) is the vengeful and hateful warrior prince of Burei, also known as "The Gunpowder Prince". Following the Altana incident that destroyed his home planet and killed his pregnant wife, he joined the Altana Liberation Army and became one of co-alliance leaders alongside Shijaku.

==== Soutatsu ====
Voiced by: Masayuki Kato

Soutatsu (蒼達) is a warrior of the Shinra Tribe. He and his men worked for the Altana Liberation Army in the mission to destroy planet Earth.

==== Ougai ====
Voiced by: Masami Iwasaki

Ougai (王蓋) is a warrior of the Dakini Tribe, who prides himself in his horns. He and his men worked for the Altana Liberation Army in the mission to destroy planet Earth.

==== Master Son ====
Voiced by: Wataru Yokojima

Son (孫老師) is a very powerful warrior of the Yato Tribe, who is over 200 years old and has refined the species' ability to change their size, shape and age by manipulating his muscles. He and his men worked for the Altana Liberation Army in the mission to destroy planet Earth.

=== Other characters ===
==== Tatsuma Sakamoto ====
Voiced by: Shin-ichiro Miki (Japanese); Alex Alvarez (first series), Christopher Ayres (The Movie), Andrew Francis (English) (third series)

Tatsuma Sakamoto (坂本 辰馬, Sakamoto Tatsuma) is a former member of the Joi, where he was a comrade of Gintoki during the fight between samurais and Amanto. He is a good-natured man and optimistic to the point of being ridiculous, even in the most dangerous situations. He also has a tendency to misspell names; he calls Gintoki "Kintoki". Despite his goofy nature, Sakamoto is actually a successful businessman in the galaxy.^{[ch. 26]} He believes that business is a way of protecting his country. He has a private, well-equipped defensive business fleet called the Kaientai (快援隊) based on the historical Kaientai. He also believes that sacrifices should be made for the good of the community, which is why he chose to abandon his comrades on Earth to travel into space.^{[ch. 27]} Due to sea and space sicknesses, Tatsuma's business is mostly run by his first mate, Mutsu. His name is based on the historical Sakamoto Ryōma.

==== Mutsu ====
Voiced by: Akeno Watanabe (Japanese); Tabitha St. Germain (English)

Mutsu (陸奥) is a member of the Yato Amanto tribe and the second-in-command of the merchant fleet Kaientai. Despite being Sakamoto Tatsuma's subordinate, she is the one running the company, instead of the usually-disappearing leader. Before then, she was the Vice-Commander of the 2nd Division of the Chidori, a group of space pirates that made money by selling slaves. However, upon learning of their plan to kill her after her father's death, Mutsu ended up being a member of the Kaientai as soon as the pirates' ships were taken over by Sakamoto. Her name is based on the historical Mutsu Munemitsu).^{[ch. 27]}

==== Tsu Terakado ====
Voiced by: Mikako Takahashi (Japanese); Christina Jopling (first series) (English)

Tsu Terakado (寺門 通, Terakado Tsū) is a famous idol pop singer from Edo. Her song lyrics are controversial and sometimes have to be censored. She started her career singing on the sides of streets.^{[ch. 19]} Her talent was recognized by Bansai Kawakami, and she has since gained popularity. Her mother manages her while her father is serving time in prison. She manages to meet her father once again during her first concert.^{[ch. 7]} She is often referred to as "Otsu" due to her habit of making words using the last letter of previous words (Terakad-O-Tsu).

==== Ichi Terakado ====
Voiced by: Masako Katsuki

Ichi Terakado (寺門 市, Terakado Ichi) is the protective mother and managing agent of Pop Idol Tsu Terakado. She resents Tsu's father for going away to prison and leaving her alone to care for their daughter.

==== Prince Hata ====
Voiced by: Kōichi Sakaguchi (Japanese); Christian Vandepas (first series), Andrew Love (The Movie) (English)

Prince Hata (ハタ皇子, Hata-ōji) is a purple alien living on Earth. He has an eccentric habit of collecting rare pets, but as he is incompetent in managing them, they often attack him or escape to cause havoc in Edo.^{[ch. 2]} The Prince is often known as "Baka Ōji" (Stupid Prince) due to his simple-mindedness and lack of responsibility with his animal collection. He is often accompanied by his butler Jii (じい) who is also annoyed by him.

==== Mitsuba Okita ====
Voiced by: Sumi Shimamoto (Japanese); Shelley Calene-Black (The Movie) (English)
Portrayed by: Kie Kitano

Mitsuba Okita (沖田 ミツバ, Okita Mitsuba) is Sogo's older sister, who care of him since their parents died when they were children. Sougo cares deeply for Mitsuba, and is uncharacteristically polite and docile when around her. She is acquainted with the rest of the Shinsengumi, and regularly brings them extra-spicy senbei, which she herself enjoys. She suffers from tuberculosis, and often requires medical treatment, which Sougo used to send money for. She has romantic feelings for Toshiro Hijikata. Although it is revealed that Hijikata does in fact love her, he feels that he is unable to give her happiness for a right reason, that is why he treats her coldly. She dies in a hospital from Edo due to her disease after a brief conversation with her brother.^{[ch. 132]} Her name is based on Okita Mitsu, Okita Sōji's real-life sister.

==== Ikumatsu Nishiki ====
Voiced by: Mayumi Asano

Ikumatsu Nishiki (錦 幾松, Nishiki Ikumatsu) is the owner of a ramen restaurant. She had a deep grudge against Joi participants, as her husband was killed by terrorism. Katsura worked at her restaurant when he was injured and hiding from the Shinsengumi. He repaid her favour by helping her during a crisis. Although she now knows his identity as a Joi participant, they are on friendly terms. Although Gintoki claims that Katsura is in a relationship with her Katsura denies it. Katsura later asks for Gintoki's help to find Ikumatsu's lost father. Her name is based on the professional name (genjina) of Kido Matsuko, the wife of Katsura Kogoro.

==== Umibouzu ====
Voiced by: Show Hayami (Japanese); Paul Louis (first series) (English)

Umibouzu (星海坊主, Umibouzu) is the father of Kagura and Kamui and one of the last members of the Yato clan.^{[ch. 57]} He is the strongest alien hunter in the universe and known as a living legend to the people of Edo. He has a cybernetic arm due to his son claiming his original in battle. In such battle, Umibouzu almost killed Kamui which left him scared of his powers to the point he decided to abandon Kagura and his dying wife. He first appears in the series trying to make Kagura leave Gintoki and Shinpachi, afraid she would be unable to control her powers and that she would kill them. However, after knowing Gintoki and how Kagura is able to use her powers to protect people, he allows her to stay in Earth.^{[ch. 63]} After he leaves to travel the galaxy hunting aliens, he is next heard from in the form of a letter.

==== Duke Kameyama ====
Voiced by: Noriaki Sugiyama

Duke Kameyama (亀山 デューク, Kameyama Duuku) also known as Sniper Kame, is an assassin who was hired to kill Katakuriko Matsudaira. He is known as the most cowardly assassin in all of Edo, which is why he gained the nickname Turtle Assassin, since turtles hide in their shells. He has a pet turtle named Kamekichi.

==== Lake Toya ====
Voiced by: Nobuo Tobita

The Spirit of Lake Toya (洞爺湖, Tōya-ko) possesses the sword that Gintoki carries. He attempted to teach the Yorozuya an ultimate technique, the "Jumbolic Magnum," which sends the target flying into the sky with a single punch. A side-effect of the attack forces the victim to shed bodily fluids from his body. Unfortunately, none of the gang ever manage to learn the attack.^{[ch. 150]}

The spirit lives with his parents. His mother has an afro hairstyle with a white beard, and his father is constantly looking for a job. His father also has a sure kill technique, called the "Jack Nicolle," in which he shoots a beam from his bald spot. Toya also keeps a pet, and it sheds a large amount of curly hair. It is said that he was a fellow student to Taikobou, the main character of Hoshin Engi. Lake Toya enjoys eating fried cuttlefish, as evidenced by the contents of his wastebasket. He claims the contents of his trash, strange-smelling hardened tissue paper, are the remnants of the occasional cuttlefish feast, although Gintoki thinks otherwise.

==== Blu-rayko ====
Voiced by: Miyuki Sawashiro

Blu-rayko (ブルー霊子, Burū Reiko) is a computer virus in the form of a girl who lives in a "cursed" Blu-ray disk, that Gintoki tries to watch and subsequently escape from. Her name is a blend of Burū-rei (ブルーレイ) "Blu-ray", Yūrei (幽霊) "Ghost" and "Reiko", a female Japanese name. She was based on Sadako Yamamura from The Ring.

==== Kamenashi ====
Voiced by: Tetsu Shiratori

Kamenashi (亀梨) is a lecherous guard of Dragon Palace City, who is caught peeping at girls on th ebeach, by Kagura. Kamenashi tried to bribe his way out of trouble by offering to bring the Yorozuya for a visit to the Dragon Palace. He later gave the reason that he was looking for brave warriors to help him stop Otohime's plan to turn all of Earth's inhabitants into old and ugly people, and that the trip was only a pretext to bring them over.

==== Otohime ====
Voiced by: Gara Takashima

Otohime (乙姫) is an Amanto of an unspecified species and the de facto ruler of the Dragon Palace City, for thousands of years. Otohime fell in love with a human Earth called Urashima long ago, when he rescued one of her minions. After the loss of Urashima, she became obsessed with beauty and would forcibly age people she deemed ugly, which is why Kamenashi brought the Yorozuya and Tae to her, to end her tyranny. She is now the owner of Snack Ryuuguujou in Edo, after being rescued by Sakata Gintoki when her palace was being destroyed.

==== Asaemon Ikeda ====
Voiced by: Marina Inoue (Japanese); Carol-Anne Day (English)

Asaemon Ikeda (池田 朝右衛門, Ikeda Asaemon) is the 19th Yaemon Ikeda of the Ikeda Clan. Beforehand, she was adopted into the clan and was given the title "17th Yaemon Ikeda" by her adoptive father, the 16th Yaemon Ikeda. After failing to execute him with Kimoarai, she left the Ikeda Clan as a traitor, with her adoptive brother being the successor of the title. Asaemon was then sold to the Hitotsubashi Faction by the 18th Yaemon Ikeda, but she survived and received the title again after his death. With the help of the Yorozuya, she was able to avenge her father.

==== Yaemon Ikeda ====
Voiced by: Isshin Chiba (Japanese); David A. Kaye (English)

Yaemon Ikeda (池田 夜右衛門, Ikeda Yaemon) is the 18th Yaemon Ikeda of the Ikeda Clan who executed the 16th head of the clan to usurp him, after the successor the latter chose to be the 17th head, his adoptive sister, was unable to do so. He then sold his adoptive sister to the Hitotsubashi and took over the clan of the official executioners of the shogunate.

==== Daishikyou ====
Voiced by: Mitsuki Saiga

Daishikyou (大司教) is an archbishop of the Dekoboko cult. They originally appeared to be a normal fortune teller on the side of the road who got Kyubei's attention. Kyubeu wished she could be a man to please Tae, Daishikyou is pleased to hear it and suddenly everyone in the Kabuki district switches genders.

==== Kouka ====
Voiced by: Rie Kugimiya

Kouka (江華, Kōka) was an extremely powerful and nigh-immortal member of the Yato Tribe. Her immortality stemmed from the Altana on the Yato homeworld, Kouan, similarly to Utsuro's being connected to his home world of Earth. When Umibouzu was dared to return to the destroyed home-world of the Yato and court the Master of Kouan, the two fell in love, despite Kouka's solitary nature. She because interested in seeing other worlds because of Umibouzu's stories and especially became interested in Earth, one touted amongst the most beautiful of planets. However, during Kagura and Kamui's early years, her condition worsened, due to being away from Kouan's Altana for far too long and she succumbed, causing the rift between Kamui and his family members.

== Merchandise ==
Various types of merchandise have been developed based on the characters from the Gintama series such as plush, key chains, pins and figurines. Kagura's character was also part of Bandai's "∞ Puti Puti Petit Moe", a series of key chains featuring characters voiced by Rie Kugimiya which simulate Kugimiya's voice. Apparels from the characters include T-shirts with images or phrases from Gintama, Shinsengumi uniforms and bags for cosplay. In addition, they have appeared in several video games and trading card games based on Gintama. Besides video games from Gintama, Gintoki and Kagura also appeared in the crossover titles Jump Super Stars and Jump Ultimate Stars, which feature characters who appeared in manga series published by Weekly Shōnen Jump.

== Reception ==
The characters from Gintama have been commented by publications for manga, anime and other media. They were praised for being very comic by Carlo Santos, writer for Anime News Network, who remarked Gintoki's personality as one of the main sources of comedy, noting his talking and reactions. However, he criticized the characters artwork as "the characters look more like they're doing static freeze-frame poses rather than actually moving." While reviewing volume 4, Santos noted Gintoki, Kagura and Shinpachi to have the only interesting stories from the manga, noting that "Nobody cares" about the ones from others characters such as Catherine. Although About.com writer Deb Aoki agreed with Santos about the problems concerning the characters artwork, she mentioned that was the only part which distracted her from enjoying the comedy from the series. She also added that the large number of characters featured in the manga has "lots of future comic possibilities." Comicbookbin.com writer Leroy Douresseaux praised the large number of alien characters appearing in the series, remarking Sorachi's artwork. However, in a later review he mentioned the "storylines here are mostly free of appearances by strange-looking aliens", but noted "the mélange of criminal ruffians and rowdy samurai makes up for it."

Popculture.com's Katherine Dacey did not find the running gags from the first volume to be funny, but instead she commented the strong point from Gintama was the characters. She mentioned the characters "add visual interest and life to every panel, keeping the reader invested when the stories stall" and found her favorite character to be Ms. Otose. The character development appearing in later volumes received mixed comments by Isaac Hale and Sam Kusek from the same site. While they commented that due to the fact the series is focused on its comedy, some characters' stories are not very deep, and they added that the series "succeeds by combining the two genres in a fun way." Alex Hoffman from comicsvillage.com commented on the large number of featured characters in the series, noting each of them have "distinct personalities" and make several appearances throughout the volume he reviewed. Despite criticizing the illustrations from the characters, Hoffman found that "the banter between characters is amazing."
