= Kōichi Sakaguchi =

Japanese voice actor

- 坂口 候一
- Occupation: Voice actor
- Years active: 1980–present
- Agent: 81 Produce
- Notable credits: Pocket Monsters as Jessie's Arbok and James' Weezing; Gintama as Prince Hata
- Website: Official profile

Kōichi Sakaguchi (坂口 候一, Sakaguchi Kōichi) is a Japanese voice actor affiliated with 81 Produce.

He had a recurring role in both the Japanese and English dubbed versions of the Pokémon television anime series, which saw him voicing Jessie's Arbok up until the sixth episode of the Hoenn series which saw Arbok and James' Weezing being released to help protect a herd of Koffing and Ekans that had been captured by a hunter.

He also appeared in the Orange League series, voicing the Orange Crew leader and champion Drake's Electabuzz and later reappeared during the Hoenn League series, voicing Morrison's Steelix in both the Japanese and English dubs of the series. He also voiced for various minor characters.

He is also known for being the voice of Prince Hata in the anime Gintama television anime series.

== Filmography ==
=== Television animation ===
- Pocket Monsters (1997) (Musashi's Arbo/Arbok, Additional voices)
- Nightwalker (1998) (Anonymous Man (ep. 4), Criminal (ep. 3))
- Bubu Chacha (1999) (Terry)
- Dual! Parallel Trouble Adventure (1999) (Male Operator, Toshihiko Izawa)
- Kaikan Phrase (1999) (Director (ep. 32), Black suit (ep. 33), Producer (ep. 38))
- Pocket Monsters: Episode Orange Archipelago (1999) (Musashi's Arbok, Additional voices)
- Pocket Monsters: Episode Gold & Silver (1999) (Musashi's Arbok, Additional voices)
- Baby Felix (2000) (Zoo)
- Boogiepop Phantom (2000) (Teacher A (ep. 7))
- Noir (2001) (Dupois, Loshuman, Renoir)
- Parappa the Rapper (2001) (Monster (ep. 12))
- Ai Yori Aoshi (2002) (Tanaka)
- Jing: King of Bandits (2002) (Crash d'Ice (ep. 11, 12, 13)
- Petite Princess Yucie (2002) (Guard (ep. 1, 6))
- Pocket Monsters: Advanced Generation (2002) (Contesta, Enishida, Musashi's Arbok, Additional voices)
- Rockman EXE (2002-2003) (NapalmMan, strange old man/shopkeeper, Kumagoro Saito)
- Bobobo-bo Bo-bobo (2003) (Eldest Dynamite Brother (ep. 3))
- Fullmetal Alchemist (2003) (Man with sunglasses (ep. 5), Master (ep. 35), Slicer (Younger Brother))
- Rockman EXE Axess (2003) (strange old man/shopkeeper)
- Area 88 (2004) (Enemy Controller (ep. 2))
- Daphne in the Brilliant Blue (2004) (Davis)
- Madlax (2004) (Friend)
- My-HiME (2004) (Mochizuki (ep. 17), Sawada (ep. 4–5))
- Rockman EXE Stream (2004-2005) (NapalmMan, Wan Tanmen)
- Ah! My Goddess (2005) (Truck driver (ep. 6))
- Glass Mask (2005) (Taichi Hotta)
- Yomigaeru Sora - Rescue Wings (2006) (Akihiro Yamaguchi (ep. 8–9))
- Pocket Monsters: Diamond and Pearl (2006) (Contesta, Additional voices)
- Rockman EXE Beast+ (2006) (strange old man/shopkeeper)
- D.Gray-man (2007) (Toma)
- Soul Eater (2008) (Jack the Ripper)
- Oreca Battle (2014) (Pandora)
- Nia Liston: The Merciless Maiden (2026) (Bendelio)

==== Unknown date ====
- .hack//Legend of the Twilight (Grunty shop owner)
- Duel Masters (Mikuni)
- Transformers: Prime (Silas)
- Gintama (Musashi (recurring), Prince Hata (recurring), Amanto (ep. 5), Crew Cut Boss (ep. 4), Father (ep. 13), Hata-miko, Jaijen (ep. 11–12); Kin'ya (ep. 14), Nojima (ep. 21), Tamo-san; Driving instructor (ep. 72), Oda Nobunaga, skeleton ghost (ep. 132)
- Hamtaro (Yumiko's Father)
- Kirarin Revolution (TanTan)
- MÄR (Edward)

=== Theatrical animation ===
- Ah! My Goddess: The Movie (2000) (Kawada)
- Pokémon Heroes - Latias & Latios (2002) (Lyon's Ariados)
- Pokémon: Lucario and the Mystery of Mew (2005) (Hellgar)
- Pokémon Ranger and the Temple of the Sea (2006) (Lovecus)
- Shin Kyūseishu Densetsu Hokuto no Ken - Raō Den Jun'ai no Shō (2006) (Leader)

=== Original video animation (OVA) ===
- Sci-Fi Harry (????) (Chris)
- Gintama (????) (Prince Hata)
- Nurse Witch Komugi (2002) (Director (ep. 1))
- Space Pirate Captain Herlock: The Endless Odyssey/Outside Legend (2002) (Operator)
- Mobile Suit Gundam: The Origin (2015) (Tem Ray)

=== Games ===
- Final Fantasy X (2001) (Cid, Kelk Ronso)
- Final Fantasy X-2 (2003) (Cid)
- Atelier Iris: Eternal Mana (2004) (Delsus)
- Call of Duty: Modern Warfare 2 (2009) (Soap)
- Castlevania Judgment (2009) (Death)
- .hack//Link (2010) (Posaune)

=== Live-action Television ===
- Kamen Rider Kuuga: Special Chapter: Zu-Gumun-Ba
- Hyakujuu Sentai Gaoranger: Duke Org Yabaiba (Main eps)/Armoured Yabaiba (ep. 30–31) (voice), Civilian (ep. 49–50) (actor)
  - Hyakujuu Sentai Gaoranger vs. Super Sentai: Duke Org Yabaiba
  - Hyakujuu Sentai Gaoranger: The Fire Mountain Roars: Duke Org Yabaiba
  - Ninpu Sentai Hurricaneger vs. Gaoranger: Duke Org Yabaiba
- Bakuryu Sentai Abaranger: Trinoid 11: Ayameganezumi (ep. 17)
- Tokusou Sentai Dekaranger: Pouchien Boraperno (ep. 28)
- GoGo Sentai Boukenger: Tsukumogami Akutagami (ep. 25)
- Juuken Sentai Gekiranger: Five Venom Fist Confrontation Beast Gecko-Fist Moriya (ep. 4, 6)
- Kamen Rider Den-O: Claw-Hand Mole Imagin (ep. 35–36) (Voiced by Daisuke Kirii (Axe-Hand (ep. 35), Akira Sasanuma (Drill-Hand (ep. 35–36))
- Engine Sentai Go-onger: Savage Sky Barbaric Machine Beast Yatai Banki (ep. 39)
- Samurai Sentai Shinkenger: Kusare Ayakashi Azemidoro (ep. 31)
- Tensou Sentai Goseiger: Matroid Bakutofuji-ER of the Timer (ep. 39–40)
- Tokumei Sentai Go-Busters: Omochiloid (ep. 44)
- Ressha Sentai ToQger: Stove Shadow (ep. 4)
- Kamen Rider Ghost: Knife Ganma (ep. 15)

=== Live-action Movie ===
- Aichaku: Nobu (2024)

=== Dubbing ===
==== Live-action ====
- Dirty Pretty Things (Guo Yi (Benedict Wong))
- Felon (Lt. Jackson (Harold Perrineau))
- The Magnificent Seven (Phillips (Griff Furst))
- Métal Hurlant Chronicles (Brad Davis (James Marsters))

==== Animation ====
- Big Hero 6 (Desk Sergeant)
- Coco (Plaza Mariachi)
- Song of the South (????, Special edition) (Br'er Rabbit)
- Thomas & Friends (Ferdinand, Shankar, Etienne, Victor, Beresford, Lord Callan (succeeded Lord Callan from Yasuhiko Kawazu))
