= Kyle C. Jones =

American actor

- Born: Kyle Colby Jones; U.S.
- Occupations: Voice director, ADR script writer, voice actor

Kyle Colby Jones is an American voice actor, director, script writer and producer at Sentai Filmworks. He is known for producing and directing English dubs, as well as adapting scripts for Japanese anime and live-action films. He has directed on Full Metal Panic!, UFO Ultramaiden Valkyrie, Air, Kanon, and Log Horizon. He directed Akame ga Kill! and Parasyte -the maxim- which were both broadcast on Adult Swim. He is also credited as K.C. Jones when voice acting. Outside of working in anime, he is also a freelance photographer and copywriter.

== Filmography ==
=== Anime ===
List of voice performances and production work in anime
Year	Title	Voice role	Crew role, notes	Source
	Majestic Prince	Rakesh Chandrasekhar	ADR Script, ADR Director	
	Nakaimo - My Sister is Among Them!	Genda		
	La storia della Arcana Famiglia	Pace		
	Akame ga Kill!	Various characters	ADR Director	
2020	Shirobako	Wataru Nakabayashi, Nobuhiro Sakurada	Assistant ADR Director	
2024	Level 1 Demon Lord and One Room Hero	George/Sigutani	ADR Script, ADR Director	
2024	I Parry Everything	Darken	ADR Script, ADR Director	
2024	Is It Wrong to Try to Pick Up Girls in a Dungeon?	Hogni	ADR Director	
2024	Dungeon People	Renfringe		
2025	Hero Without a Class: Who Even Needs Skills?!	Rod		

=== Film ===
List of voice performances and production work in direct-to-video and television films
Year	Title	Voice role	Crew role, notes	Source
	Gintama: The Movie		ADR Director	
