= Does (band) =

Japanese rock band

- Origin: Fukuoka, Japan
- Genres: Alternative rock; garage rock; hard rock
- Years active: 2000–2016, 2020–present
- Label: Ki/oon Records
- Members: Wataru Ujihara; Yasushi Akatsuka; Kēsaku Morita
- Website: https://www.doesdoesdoes.com/

DOES (ドーズ, Dōzu) is a three-piece Japanese rock band. DOES was formed in 2000 in the Fukuoka prefecture, where they continued to write songs and perform gigs until 2005. In 2005, some members left and the group went on hiatus. Releasing songs since 2004, DOES signed with Ki/oon Records in 2006. In 2008, their sixth single "Donten" reached third on the Oricon weekly music ranking charts. It was also the fifth opening for the anime Gintama.

On April 21, 2010, the band released their single "Bakuchi Dancer." The single sold around 33,000 copies in its initial week and debuted at number 3 on the Oricon weekly charts. The single ended up to be the 30th best selling single for the first half of 2010 and the 74th best single of the entire year.

On November 14, 2012, the band released the single "Yumemiru Sekai", which is also the third opening for Space Brothers.

In summer 2014 they released a CD single called "Guren" to be used as the 15th opening to the anime Naruto: Shippuden. On August 6, 2014, their special sixth album DOES went on sale.

The band went on a hiatus in 2016 and returned in 2020.

== Members ==
- Wataru Ujihara (氏原 ワタル, Ujihara Wataru) – lead vocals, guitar
- Yasushi Akatsuka (赤塚 ヤスシ, Akatsuka Yasushi) – bass guitar, vocals
- Keisaku Morita (森田 ケーサク, Morita Kēsaku) – drums, vocals

== Discography ==
=== Independent releases ===
1. "DOES" (March 5, 2004)
2. "outside" (February 20, 2005)
3. "fish for you" (June 9, 2005)
4. "Fish For You No. 2" (March 8, 2006)

=== Singles ===
1. "Ashita wa Kuru no ka" (明日は来るのか; "Will Tomorrow Come") (September 6, 2006)
2. "Akai Sunday" (赤いサンデー, Akai Sandē; "Red Sunday") (November 1, 2006)
3. "Sangatsu" (三月; "March") (March 21, 2007)
4. "Shura" (修羅; "Carnage") (May 16, 2007)
  - 5th ending for anime series Gintama
5. "Subterranean Baby Blues" (サブタレニアン・ベイビー・ブルース, Sabutarenian Beibī Burūsu) (October 31, 2007)
6. "Donten" (曇天; "Cloudy Weather") (June 18, 2008)
  - 5th opening for anime series Gintama
7. "Hi wa Mata Noboru" (陽はまた昇る; "Sun Will Rise Again") (October 22, 2008)
8. "Sekai no Hate/Torch Lighter" (世界の果て / トーチ・ライター, Sekai no Hate / Tōchi Raitā; "The Edge of the World / Torch Lighter") (April 8, 2009)
9. "Bakuchi Dancer / Bokutachi no Kisetsu" (バクチ・ダンサー / 僕たちの季節, Bakuchi Dansā / Bokutachi no Kisetsu; "Fullspeed Dancer / Bokura no Kisetsu") (April 21, 2010)
  - 1st opening and 1st ending for the film Gintama: The Movie
10. "Jack Knife" (ジャック・ナイフ, Jakku Naifu) (October 20, 2010)
  - Opening theme song for the PSP game Kenka Bancho 5
11. "Ima o Ikiru" (今を生きる; "Now I Live") (March 14, 2012)
12. "Yumemiru Sekai" (夢見る世界; "The World Seen in Dreams") (November 14, 2012)
  - 3rd opening for anime series Space Brothers
13. Guren (July 2, 2014)
  - 15th opening for anime series Naruto: Shippuden
14. Run Nova (November 14, 2015)
15. KNOW KNOW KNOW (March 2, 2016)
  - 17th opening of anime series Gintama
16. Douraku Shinjou (January 6, 2021)
17. BackBeat (January 19, 2022)
18. In The Sun (March 4, 2022)
19. 骨折り儲けの草臥れ損 (June 9, 2022)
20. 暁 (July 11, 2024)

=== Albums ===
1. NEWOLD (November 8, 2006)
2. SUBTERRANEAN ROMANCE (November 18, 2007)
3. The World's Edge (April 29, 2009)
4. Modern Age (December 15, 2010)
5. KATHARSIVILIZATION (May 9, 2012)
6. Other side of Does (September 25, 2013)
7. DOES (August 6, 2014)
8. Innocence (April 27, 2016)
