= List of Gintama episodes =

Key visual for the series

The episodes of the Japanese anime series Gintama were animated by Sunrise. The first 99 episodes were directed by Shinji Takamatsu. Episodes 100 to 105 were directed by Takamatsu and Yoichi Fujita, while following episodes only by Fujita. It premiered on TV Tokyo on April 4, 2006, and finished on March 25, 2010, with a total of 201 episodes. The anime is based on Hideaki Sorachi's manga of the same name. The story revolves around an eccentric samurai, Gintoki Sakata, his apprentice, Shinpachi Shimura, and a teenage alien girl named Kagura. All three are freelancers who search for work in order to pay the monthly rent, which usually goes unpaid anyway.

In Japan, Aniplex distributes the anime in DVD format. A total of thirteen volumes were released for the first season, between July 26, 2006, and June 26, 2007. The second season was released over another set of thirteen volumes between July 25, 2007, and July 23, 2008. Season 3 was released in thirteen volumes from August 27, 2008, to August 26, 2009. The fourth season was collected in thirteen DVD volumes from October 28, 2009, to October 27, 2010. Prior to the series' premier, an original video animation (OVA) of Gintama by Sunrise was showing at Jump Festa Anime Tour in 2005. A ten-minute long OVA named Shiroyasha Kotan (白夜叉降誕; lit. "White Demon's Birth"), set in the war between aliens and samurais, was shown in Jump Festa 2008. On September 30, 2009, it was published a DVD named Gintama Jump Anime Tour 2008 & 2005 which contains the 2005 and 2008 OVAs.

On January 8, 2009, the streaming video service Crunchyroll began offering English subtitled episodes of the series. On the same day, Crunchyroll also began uploading episodes from the beginning of the series at a rate of two a week. The anime is licensed by Sentai Filmworks, with distribution from Section23 Films. Section23 Films' Chris Oarr commented that only the first two seasons were licensed, with an option on the rest. The first collection containing thirteen English-subtitled episodes was released on DVD on April 27, 2010.

While the original anime series ended with the fourth season, a sequel series, titled Gintama' and directed by Yoichi Fujita, began airing on April 4, 2011, and concluded on March 28, 2013, after sixty-four episodes. A third anime series, Gintama°, was produced by BN Pictures with Chizuru Miyawaki directing. This series lasted fifty-one episodes and was broadcast from on April 8, 2015, to March 30, 2016.

The latest anime season, Gintama. Shirogane no Tamashii-hen, premiered on January 7, 2018, and ended on October 7, 2018, after twenty-six episodes.

== Series overview ==
The "seasons" for the Gintama episodes corresponds to the series' international release outside of Japan. In Japan, Gintama aired year round continuously with regular preemptions in place for specials and sporting events, not split into standard seasonal cycles. For Gintama', the series aired for three consecutive cours and this format was carried over for Gintama°. A single cours was used on the second series' final cours, Gintama': Enchōsen, while Gintama. aired for three cours with the first one being non-consecutive.

Season	Title	Episodes	Originally released	
Season	Title	Episodes	First released	Last released
1	Gintama season 1	49	April 4, 2006	March 29, 2007
2	Gintama season 2	50	April 5, 2007	March 27, 2008
3	Gintama season 3	51	April 3, 2008	March 26, 2009
4	Gintama season 4	51	April 2, 2009	March 25, 2010
5	Gintama'	51	April 4, 2011	March 26, 2012
6	Gintama': Enchōsen	13	October 4, 2012	March 28, 2013
7	Gintama°	51	April 8, 2015	March 10, 2016
8	Gintama.	12	January 8, 2017	March 26, 2017
9	Gintama. Porori-hen	13	October 1, 2017	December 24, 2017
10	Gintama. Shirogane no Tamashii-hen	26	January 7, 2018	October 7, 2018

== Episode list ==
=== Season 1 (2006–07) ===
No. overall	No. in season	Title	Original release date
1–2	1–2	"You Guys!! Do You Even Have Gintama?!"; Transliteration: "Temeraaaa!! Soredemo Gintama tsuiten no kaaaa" (Japanese: てめーらァァァ!!それでも銀魂ついてんのかァァァ)	April 4, 2006
3	3	"Nobody With Naturally Wavy Hair Can Be That Bad"; Transliteration: "Tennen pāma ni warui yatsu wa inai" (Japanese: 天然パーマに悪い奴はいない)	April 11, 2006
4	4	"Watch Out! JUMP Sometimes Comes Out On Saturdays!"; Transliteration: "JUMP wa tokidoki doyō ni deru kara ki o tsukero" (Japanese: ジャンプは時々土曜にでるから気をつけろ)	April 25, 2006
5	5	"Make Friends You Can Call By Their Nicknames, Even When You're An Old Fart"; Transliteration: "Jijii ni nattemo adana de yobiaeru tomodachi o tsukure" (Japanese: ジジィになってもあだ名で呼び合える友達を作れ)	May 2, 2006
6	6	"Keep Your Promise Even If It Kills You"; Transliteration: "Ichido shita yakusoku wa shindemo mamore" (Japanese: 一度した約束は死んでも守れ)	May 9, 2006
7	7	"Responsible Owners Should Clean Up After Their Pets"; Transliteration: "Petto wa kainushiga sekinin o motte saigo made mendō o mimashō" (Japanese: ペットは飼い主が責任をもって最後まで面倒を見ましょう)	May 16, 2006
8	8	"There Is Butt A Fine Line Between Persistence And Stubbornness"; Transliteration: "Nebarizuyosa to shitsukosa wa kamihitoe" (Japanese: 粘り強さとしつこさは紙一重)	May 23, 2006
9	9	"Fighting Should Be Done With Fists"; Transliteration: "Kenka wa gū de yarubeshi" (Japanese: 喧嘩はグーでやるべし)	May 30, 2006
10	10	"Eat Something Sour When You're Tired"; Transliteration: "Tsukareta toki wa suppai mono o" (Japanese: 疲れたときは酸っぱいものを)	June 6, 2006
11	11	"Look, Overly Sticky Sweet Dumplings Are Not Real Dumplings, You Idiot!"; Transliteration: "Becha becha shita dango nantena dango jane bakayarō" (Japanese: べちゃべちゃした団子なんてなァ団子じゃねぇバカヤロー)	June 13, 2006
12	12	"People Who Make Good First Impressions Usually Suck"; Transliteration: "Daiichi inshō ga ii yatsu ni roku na yatsu wa inai" (Japanese: 第一印象がいい奴にロクな奴はいない)	June 13, 2006
13	13	"If You're Going To Cosplay, Go All Out"; Transliteration: "Kosupure suru nara kokoro made kazare" (Japanese: コスプレするなら心まで飾れ)	June 20, 2006
14	14	"Boys Have A Weird Ritual That Makes Them Think They Turn Into Men When They Touch A Frog"; Transliteration: "Otoko ni wa kaeru ni sawarete ichininmae mitai na wake no wakaranai rūru ga aru" (Japanese: 男にはカエルに触れて一人前みたいな訳のわからないルールがある)	July 4, 2006
14	14	"You Only Gotta Wash Under Your Armpits - Just The Armpits"; Transliteration: "Waki dake arattokya iin dayo waki dake" (Japanese: 脇だけ洗っときゃいいんだよ脇だけ)	July 4, 2006
15	15	"Pets Resemble Their Owners"; Transliteration: "Kainushi to petto wa niru" (Japanese: 飼い主とペットは似る)	July 11, 2006
16	16	"If You Stop And Think About It, Your Life's A Lot Longer As An Old Guy Than A Kid! Whoa, Scary!"; Transliteration: "Kangaetara jinseitte ossan ni natte kara no hō ga nagaijane-ka! kowa!!" (Japanese: 考えたら人生ってオッさんになってからの方が長いじゃねーか!怖っ!!)	July 18, 2006
17	17	"Sons Only Take After Their Fathers' Negative Attributes"; Transliteration: "Oyakotte no wa kirai na tokobakari niru mon da" (Japanese: 親子ってのは嫌いなとこばかり似るもんだ)	July 25, 2006
18	18	"Oh, Yeah! Our Crib Is Number One!"; Transliteration: "Aa yappari wagayaga ichiban da wa" (Japanese: ああやっぱり我が家が一番だわ)	August 1, 2006
19	19	"Why Is The Sea So Salty? Because You City Folk Pee Whenever You Go Swimming!"; Transliteration: "Umi ga naze shoppai dato? Ome-ra tokaijin ga oyoginagara yō tashiteku kara darō-gaaa" (Japanese: 海がなぜしょっぱいだと?オメーら都会人が泳ぎながら用足してくからだろーがァァ)	August 8, 2006
20	20	"Watch Out For Conveyor Belts!"; Transliteration: "Beruto konbea ni wa ki o tsukero" (Japanese: ベルトコンベアには気をつけろ)	August 15, 2006
21	21	"If You're A Man, Try The Swordfish!"; Transliteration: "Otoko nara toriaezu kajiki" (Japanese: 男ならとりあえずカジキ)	August 22, 2006
21	21	"If You Go To Sleep With The Fan On You'll Get A Stomachache, So Be Careful"; Transliteration: "Senpūki tsukeppanashide neruto onaka kowashichau kara ki o tsukete" (Japanese: 扇風機つけっぱなしで寝るとおなか壊しちゃうから気をつけて)	August 22, 2006
22	22	"Marriage Is Prolonging An Illusion For Your Whole Life"; Transliteration: "Kekkon to wa kanchigai o isshōgai shitsuzukeru koto da" (Japanese: 結婚とは勘違いを一生涯し続けることだ)	September 5, 2006
23	23	"When You're In A Fix, Keep On Laughing, Laughing..."; Transliteration: "Komatta toki wa warattoke warattoke" (Japanese: 困ったときは笑っとけ笑っとけ)	September 12, 2006
24	24	"Cute Faces Are Always Hiding Something"; Transliteration: "Kawaii kao ni wa kanarazu nanikaga kakureteru" (Japanese: カワイイ顔には必ず何かが隠れてる)	September 19, 2006
25	25	"A Shared Soup Pot Is A Microcosm Of Life"; Transliteration: "Nabe wa jinsei no shukuzu de aru" (Japanese: 鍋は人生の縮図である)	October 5, 2006
26	26	"Don't Be Shy - Just Raise Your Hand And Say It"; Transliteration: "Hazukashi garazu ni te o agete ie" (Japanese: 恥ずかしがらずに手を挙げて言え)	October 12, 2006
27	27	"Some Things Can't Be Cut With A Sword"; Transliteration: "Katana ja kirenai mono ga aru" (Japanese: 刀じゃ斬れないものがある)	October 19, 2006
28	28	"Good Things Never Come In Twos (But Bad Things Do)"; Transliteration: "Ii koto wa renzoku shite okoranai kuse ni warui koto wa renzoku shite okoru mon da" (Japanese: いい事は連続して起こらないくせに悪い事は連続して起こるもんだ)	October 26, 2006
29	29	"Don't Panic - There's A Return Policy!"; Transliteration: "Awateruna! Kūringu ofu to iu mono ga aru" (Japanese: 慌てるな!クーリングオフというものがある)	November 2, 2006
29	29	"I Told You To Pay Attention To The News!"; Transliteration: "Terebi toka shinbun toka chanto minaito damedatte" (Japanese: テレビとか新聞とかちゃんと見ないとダメだって)	November 2, 2006
30	30	"Even Teen Idols Act Like You Guys"; Transliteration: "Aidoru datte hobo omaera to onaji koto yattendayo" (Japanese: アイドルだってほぼお前らと同じ事やってんだよ)	November 9, 2006
31	31	"You Always Remember The Things That Matter The Least"; Transliteration: "Dōdemoii koto ni kagitte nakanaka wasurenai" (Japanese: どうでもいい事に限ってなかなか忘れない)	November 16, 2006
32	32	"Life Moves On Like A Conveyor Belt"; Transliteration: "Jinsei wa beruto konbea no yōni nagareru" (Japanese: 人生はベルトコンベアのように流れる)	November 23, 2006
33	33	"Mistaking Someone's Name Is Rude!"; Transliteration: "Hito no namae toka machigaeru no shitsurei da" (Japanese: 人の名前とか間違えるの失礼だ)	November 30, 2006
34	34	"Love Doesn't Require A Manual"; Transliteration: "Koi ni manyuaru nante iranai" (Japanese: 恋にマニュアルなんていらない)	December 7, 2006
35	35	"Love Doesn't Require A Manual (Continued)"; Transliteration: "Koi ni manyuaru nante iranai (enchōsen)" (Japanese: 恋にマニュアルなんていらない(延長戦))	December 14, 2006
35	35	"You Can't Judge A Person By His Appearance, Either"; Transliteration: "Gaiken dake de hito o handan shicha dame" (Japanese: 外見だけで人を判断しちゃダメ)	December 14, 2006
36	36	"People With Dark Pasts Can't Shut Up"; Transliteration: "Sune ni kizu ga aruyatsu hodo yoku shaberu" (Japanese: すねに傷がある奴ほどよくしゃべる)	December 21, 2006
37	37	"People Who Say That Santa Doesn't Really Exist Actually Want To Believe In Him"; Transliteration: "Santa nante inēndayotte iiharu yatsu koso honto wa irutte shinjitaindayo" (Japanese: サンタなんていねーんだよって言い張る奴こそホントはいるって信じたいんだよ)	December 28, 2006
37	37	"Prayer Won't Make Your Worldly Desires Go Away! Control Yourself"; Transliteration: "Bonnō ga kane de kieru kaaa onore de seigyo shiro onore de" (Japanese: 煩悩が鐘で消えるかァァ己で制御しろ己で)	December 28, 2006
38	38	"Only Children Play In The Snow"; Transliteration: "Yuki de hashagu no kodomo dake" (Japanese: 雪ではしゃぐの子供だけ)	January 11, 2007
38	38	"Eating Ice Cream In Winter Is Awesome"; Transliteration: "Fuyu ni taberu aisu mo nakanaka otsu na monda" (Japanese: 冬に食べるアイスもなかなかオツなモンだ)	January 11, 2007
39	39	"Ramen Shops With Long Menus Never Do Well"; Transliteration: "Menyū ga ōi rāmen'ya wa taitei hayattenai" (Japanese: メニューが多いラーメン屋はたいてい流行ってない)	January 18, 2007
40	40	"Give A Thought To Planned Pregnancy"; Transliteration: "Kozukuri wa keikaku teki ni" (Japanese: 子作りは計画的に)	January 25, 2007
41	41	"You Can't Judge A Movie By Its Title"; Transliteration: "Taitoru dakeja eiga no omoshirosa wa wakannai" (Japanese: タイトルだけじゃ映画の面白さはわかんない)	February 1, 2007
42	42	"You Know What Happens If You Pee On A Worm"; Transliteration: "Mimizu ni oshikko kakeru to hareruyo" (Japanese: ミミズにおしっこかけると腫れるよ)	February 8, 2007
43	43	"Make Characters So Anybody Can Tell Who They Are By Just Their Silhouettes"; Transliteration: "Kyarakutā wa shiruetto dake de dokusha ni miwakega tsukuyōni kakimashō" (Japanese: キャラクターはシルエットだけで読者に見分けがつくように描きましょう)	February 15, 2007
43	43	"Since It Ended A Bit Early, We're Starting The Next One"; Transliteration: "Nanka hayaku owatchatta node jikai no hanashi o hajimechaou" (Japanese: なんか早く終わっちゃったので次回の話をはじめちゃおう)	February 15, 2007
44	44	"Mom's Busy, Too, So Quit Complaining About What's For Dinner"; Transliteration: "Okāsan datte isogashiin dakara yūhan no menyū ni monku tsukeru no yamenasai" (Japanese: お母さんだって忙しいんだから夕飯のメニューに文句つけるの止めなさい)	February 22, 2007
45	45	"Walk Your Dog At An Appropriate Speed"; Transliteration: "Aiken no sanpo wa tekido na supīdo de" (Japanese: 愛犬の散歩は適度なスピードで)	March 1, 2007
46	46	"Adults Only. We Wouldn't Want Anyone Immature In Here..."; Transliteration: "XX asobi wa hatachi ni natte kara" (Japanese: XX遊びは20歳になってから)	March 8, 2007
47	47	"Do Cherries Come From Cherry Trees?"; Transliteration: "Sakuranbotte are sakura no ki ni naruno?" (Japanese: さくらんぼってアレ桜の木になるの?)	March 15, 2007
48	48	"The More You're Alike, The More You Fight"; Transliteration: "Niteru futari wa kenka suru" (Japanese: 似てる二人は喧嘩する)	March 22, 2007
48	48	"Whatever You Play, Play To Win"; Transliteration: "Nande are yarukara niwa makecha dame" (Japanese: 何であれ やるからには負けちゃダメ)	March 22, 2007
49	49	"A Life Without Gambling Is Like Sushi Without Wasabi"; Transliteration: "Gyanburu no nai jinsei nante wasabi nuki no sushi mitē na monda" (Japanese: ギャンブルのない人生なんてわさび抜きの寿司みてぇなもんだ)	March 29, 2007

=== Season 2 (2007–08) ===
No. overall	No. in season	Title	Original release date
50	1	"Pending Means Pending, It's Not Final"; Transliteration: "Mitei wa Mitei de atte Kettei dewanai" (Japanese: 未定は未定であって決定ではない)	April 5, 2007
51	2	"Milk Should Be Served At Body Temperature"; Transliteration: "Miruku wa hitohada no ondo de" (Japanese: ミルクは人肌の温度で)	April 12, 2007
52	3	"If You Want To See Someone, Make An Appo First"; Transliteration: "Hito ni au toki wa mazu apo o" (Japanese: 人に会うときはまずアポを)	April 19, 2007
53	4	"Stress Makes You Bald, But It's Stressful To Avoid Stress, So You End Up Stressed Out Anyway, So In The End There's Nothing You Can Do"; Transliteration: "Sutoresu wa hageru gen'in ni naru ga sutoresu o tamenai yōni ki o kubaruto sokode mata sutoresu ga tamarunode kekkyoku bokurani dekiru koto nante nanimo nai" (Japanese: ストレスはハゲる原因になるがストレスをためないように気を配るとそこでまたストレスがたまるので結局僕らにできることなんて何もない)	April 26, 2007
54	5	"Mothers Everywhere Are All The Same"; Transliteration: "Doko no kāchan mo daitai onaji" (Japanese: どこの母ちゃんもだいたい同じ)	May 3, 2007
55	6	"Don't Make Munching Noises When You Eat"; Transliteration: "Mono taberu toki kucha kucha oto o tatenai" (Japanese: もの食べるときクチャクチャ音をたてない)	May 10, 2007
56	7	"Keep An Eye On The Chief For The Day"; Transliteration: "Ichinichi kyokuchō ni ki o tsukero-ttenmaiyā-san" (Japanese: 一日局長に気をつけろッテンマイヤーさん)	May 17, 2007
57	8	"When Looking For Things You've Lost, Remember What You Were Doing On The Day You Lost It"; Transliteration: "Nakushita mono o sagasu toki wa sono hi no kōdō o sakanobore" (Japanese: 無くした物を探すときはその日の行動をさかのぼれ)	May 24, 2007
58	9	"Croquette Sandwiches Are Always The Most Popular Food Sold At The Stalls"; Transliteration: "Baiten de wa yappari korokke pan ga ichiban ninki" (Japanese: 売店ではやっぱりコロッケパンが一番人気)	May 31, 2007
59	10	"Be Careful Not To Leave Your Umbrella Somewhere"; Transliteration: "Kasa no okiwasure ni chūi" (Japanese: 傘の置き忘れに注意)	June 7, 2007
60	11	"The Sun Will Rise Again"; Transliteration: "Hi wa mata noboru" (Japanese: 陽はまた昇る)	June 14, 2007
61	12	"On A Moonless Night, Insects Are Drawn To The Light"; Transliteration: "Yamiyo no mushi wa hikari ni tsudou" (Japanese: 闇夜の虫は光に集う)	June 21, 2007
62	13	"Even Mummy Hunters Sometimes Turn Into Mummys"; Transliteration: "Miira tori ga miira ni" (Japanese: ミイラ捕りがミイラに)	June 28, 2007
63	14	"The Preview Section In JUMP Is Always Unreliable"; Transliteration: "Janpu no jigō yokoku wa ateni naranai" (Japanese: ジャンプの次号予告は当てにならない)	July 5, 2007
64	15	"Eating Nmaibo Can Make You Full In No Time!"; Transliteration: "Nmaibō wa igai to onaka ippai ni naru" (Japanese: んまい棒は意外とお腹いっぱいになる)	July 12, 2007
65	16	"Rhinoceros Beetles Teach Boys That Life Is Precious"; Transliteration: "Shōnen wa kabutomushi o tōshi seimei no tōtosa o shiru" (Japanese: 少年はカブト虫を通し生命の尊さを知る)	July 19, 2007
66	17	"Dango Over Flowers"; Transliteration: "Hana yori dango" (Japanese: 華より団子)	July 26, 2007
67	18	"For The Wind Is The Life"; Transliteration: "Hashiri tsuzukete koso jinsei" (Japanese: 走り続けてこそ人生)	August 2, 2007
67	18	"The Ideal Girlfriend Is Always Minami"; Transliteration: "Risō no kanojo wa yappari Minami-chan" (Japanese: 理想の彼女はやっぱり南ちゃん)	August 2, 2007
68	19	"Like A Haunted House, Life Is Filled With Horrors"; Transliteration: "Wataru seken wa obake bakari" (Japanese: 渡る世間はオバケばかり)	August 9, 2007
69	20	"Please Help By Separating Your Trash"; Transliteration: "Gomi no bunbetsu kaishū ni gokyōryoku kudasai" (Japanese: ゴミの分別回収にご協力下さい)	August 16, 2007
70	21	"Too Many Cuties Can Make You Sick"; Transliteration: "Kawaii mono mo ōsugiru to kimochi warui" (Japanese: 可愛いモノも多すぎると気持ち悪い)	August 23, 2007
71	22	"Some Data Cannot Be Erased"; Transliteration: "Kesenai dēta mo aru" (Japanese: 消せないデータもある)	August 30, 2007
72	23	"A Dog's Paws Smell Fragrant"; Transliteration: "Inu no nikukyū wa kōbashii nioi ga suru" (Japanese: 犬の肉球はこうばしい匂いがする)	September 6, 2007
72	23	"Drive With A "Might" Attitude"; Transliteration: "Kamoshirenai unten de ike" (Japanese: かもしれない運転で行け)	September 6, 2007
73	24	"Think For A Minute Now, Do Matsutake Mushrooms Really Taste All That Good?"; Transliteration: "Sonna ni matsutakette oishii mon nanoka ichido yoku kangaete miyō" (Japanese: そんなに松茸って美味しいもんなのか一度良く考えてみよう)	September 13, 2007
74	25	"The Manga Writer Becomes A Pro, After Doing A Stock Of Manuscripts"; Transliteration: "Mangaka wa genkō no sutokku ga dekitekoso ichininmae" (Japanese: 漫画家は原稿のストックが出来てこそ一人前)	September 20, 2007
75	26	"Don't Complain About Your Job At Home, Do It Somewhere Else"; Transliteration: "Shigoto no guchi wa ie de kobosazu soto de kobose!" (Japanese: 仕事のグチは家でこぼさず外でこぼせ!)	September 27, 2007
76	27	"In Those Situations, Keep Quiet And Cook Red Rice With Beans"; Transliteration: "Sō iu toki wa damatte sekihan" (Japanese: そういう時は黙って赤飯)	October 4, 2007
77	28	"Yesterday's Enemy, After All Is Said And Done, Is Still The Enemy"; Transliteration: "Kinō no teki wa kyō mo nan'ya kan'ya de teki" (Japanese: 昨日の敵は今日もなんやかんやで敵)	October 11, 2007
78	29	"People Who Are Picky About Food Are Also Picky About People, Too"; Transliteration: "Tabemono no sukikirai ga ōi hito wa ningen no sukikirai mo ōi" (Japanese: 食べ物の好き嫌いが多い人は人間の好き嫌いも多い)	October 18, 2007
79	30	"Four Heads Are Better Than One"; Transliteration: "Yonin soroeba ironna chie" (Japanese: 四人揃えばいろんな知恵)	October 25, 2007
80	31	"When Someone Who Wears Glasses Takes Them Off, It Looks Like Something's Missing"; Transliteration: "Fudan megane o kaketeru yatsu ga megane o hazusuto nanka mono tarinai, pātsu ga ikko tarinai kigasuru" (Japanese: 普段眼鏡をかけてる奴が眼鏡を外すとなんかもの足りない パーツが一個足りない気がする)	November 8, 2007
81	32	"A Woman's Best Make Up Is Her Smile"; Transliteration: "Onna no ichiban no keshō wa egao" (Japanese: 女の一番の化粧は笑顔)	November 15, 2007
82	33	"You Don't Stand In Line For The Ramen, You Stand In Line For The Self Satisfaction"; Transliteration: "Rāmen no tameni narabun janai jikomanzoku no tame narabun da" (Japanese: ラーメンのために並ぶんじゃない自己満足のため並ぶんだ)	November 22, 2007
82	33	"You Say Kawaii So Often, You Must Really Think You're Cute Stuff"; Transliteration: "Kawaii o renpatsu suru jibunjishin o kawaii to omottendaro Omaera" (Japanese: カワイイを連発する自分自身をカワイイと思ってんだろ お前ら)	November 22, 2007
83	34	"Rank Has Nothing To Do With Luck"; Transliteration: "Un ni mibun wa kankei nai" (Japanese: 運に身分は関係ない)	November 29, 2007
84	35	"Hard-Boiled Egg On A Man's Heart"; Transliteration: "Otoko wa kokoro ni katayude tamago" (Japanese: 男は心に固ゆで卵)	December 6, 2007
85	36	"Hard-Boiled Eggs Don't Crack"; Transliteration: "Katayude tamago wa tsuburenai" (Japanese: 固ゆで卵は潰れない)	December 13, 2007
86	37	"It's Often Difficult To Sleep When You're Engrossed With Counting Sheep"; Transliteration: "Hitsuji kazoeru no jitaini muchū ni nattarishite kekkyoku nemurenai koto mo ōi" (Japanese: 羊数えるの自体に夢中になったりして結局眠れないことも多い)	December 20, 2007
87	38	"Perform A German Suplex On A Woman Who Asks If She Or The Job Is More Important"; Transliteration: "Watashi to shigoto dotchiga daiji nanokato iu onna ni wa jāman sūpurekkusu" (Japanese: 私と仕事どっちが大事なのかという女にはジャーマンスープレックス)	December 27, 2007
88	39	"The Most Exciting Part Of A Group Date Is Before It Starts"; Transliteration: "Gōkon wa hajimaru madega ichiban tanoshii" (Japanese: 合コンは始まるまでが一番楽しい)	January 10, 2008
89	40	"What Happens Twice, Happens Thrice"; Transliteration: "Nido aru koto wa sando aru." (Japanese: 2度あることは3度ある)	January 17, 2008
90	41	"The More Delicious The Food, The Nastier It Is When It Goes Bad"; Transliteration: "Oishii mono hodo ataru to kowai" (Japanese: 美味しいものほど当たると恐い)	January 24, 2008
91	42	"If You Want To Lose Weight, Then Stop Eating And Start Moving"; Transliteration: "Yasetai nara ugoke taberuna" (Japanese: やせたいなら動け 食べるな)	January 31, 2008
92	43	"Be A Person Who Can See People's Strong Points And Not Their Weak Points"; Transliteration: "Hito no tansho o mitsukeru yori chōsho o mitsukerareru hito ni nare." (Japanese: 人の短所を見つけるより長所を見つけられる人になれ)	February 7, 2008
93	44	"Even A Hero Has Issues"; Transliteration: "Hīrō datte nayan deru" (Japanese: ヒーローだって悩んでる)	February 14, 2008
94	45	"When Riding A Train, Make Sure You Grab The Straps With Both Hands"; Transliteration: "Densha ni noru toki wa kanarazu ryōte o tsurikawani" (Japanese: 電車に乗る時は必ず両手をつり革に)	February 21, 2008
95	46	"Men, Be A Madao"; Transliteration: "Otoko tachi yo madao de are" (Japanese: 男たちよマダオであれ)	February 28, 2008
96	47	"If You're A Man, Don't Give Up"; Transliteration: "Otoko nara akirameru na" (Japanese: 男なら諦めるな)	March 6, 2008
97	48	"Exaggerate The Tales Of Your Exploits By A Third, So Everyone Has A Good Time"; Transliteration: "Mukashi no buyūden wa sanwarimashi de hanase" (Japanese: 昔の武勇伝は三割増で話せ)	March 13, 2008
97	48	"Men Have A Weakness For Girls Who Sell Flowers And Work In Pastry Shops"; Transliteration: "Hanaya toka kēki ya no musume ni otoko wa yowai" (Japanese: 花屋とかケーキ屋の娘に男は弱い)	March 13, 2008
98	49	"Play Video Games For Only An Hour A Day"; Transliteration: "Gēmu wa ichinichi ichijikan" (Japanese: ゲームは一日一時間)	March 20, 2008
99	50	"Life And Video Games Are Full Of Bugs"; Transliteration: "Jinsei mo Gēmu mo bagu darake" (Japanese: 人生もゲームもバグだらけ)	March 27, 2008

=== Season 3 (2008–09) ===
No. overall	No. in season	Title	Original release date
100	1	"The More Something Is Disliked, The More Lovely It Is"; Transliteration: "Sukarenai mono hodo itōshii" (Japanese: 好かれないものほど愛おしい)	April 3, 2008
101	2	"Rules Are Made To Be Broken"; Transliteration: "Okite wa yaburu tame ni koso aru" (Japanese: 掟は破るためにこそある)	April 10, 2008
102	3	"Otaku Are Talkative"; Transliteration: "Otaku wa hanashizuki" (Japanese: オタクは話好き)	April 17, 2008
103	4	"There's A Thin Line Between Strengths And Weaknesses"; Transliteration: "Chōsho to tansho wa kamihitoe" (Japanese: 長所と短所は紙一重)	April 24, 2008
104	5	"Important Things Are Hard To See"; Transliteration: "Taisetsu na mono wa mienikui" (Japanese: 大切なものは見えにくい)	May 1, 2008
105	6	"It's All About The Beat And Timing"; Transliteration: "Nanigoto mo norito taimingu" (Japanese: 何事もノリとタイミング)	May 8, 2008
106	7	"Love Is Often Played Out In Sudden Death"; Transliteration: "Ren'aitte taitei sadondesu hōshiki" (Japanese: 恋愛ってたいていサドンデス方式)	May 15, 2008
107	8	"Kids Don't Understand How Their Parents Feel"; Transliteration: "Oya no kokoro ko shirazu" (Japanese: 親の心子知らず)	May 22, 2008
108	9	"Some Things Are Better Left Unsaid"; Transliteration: "Iwanuga hana" (Japanese: 言わぬが花)	May 29, 2008
109	10	"Life Is A Test"; Transliteration: "Jinsei wa shiken da" (Japanese: 人生は試験だ)	June 5, 2008
110	11	"People Are All Escapees Of Their Own Inner Prisons"; Transliteration: "Hito wa mina jibun toiu ori o yaburu datsugoku shū" (Japanese: 人は皆自分という檻を破る脱獄囚)	June 12, 2008
111	12	"Definitely Do Not Let Your Girlfriend See The Things You Use For Cross-Dressing"; Transliteration: "NH mono wa kanojo ni mitsukaru na" (Japanese: NH物は彼女に見つかるな)	June 19, 2008
111	12	"There's Almost A 100% Chance You'll Forget Your Umbrella And Hate Yourself For It"; Transliteration: "Hobo 100% no kakuritsu de binīrugasa o okiwasurete kuru jibun ga kirai" (Japanese: ほぼ100%の確率でビニール傘を置き忘れてくる自分が嫌い)	June 19, 2008
112	13	"Lucky Is A Man Who Gets Up And Goes To Work"; Transliteration: "Nijūdai no Tanjoubi ni Fukai Imi wa nai / Okite hataraku kahōmono" (Japanese: 二十代の誕生日に深い意味はない/ 起きて働く果報者)	June 26, 2008
113	14	"Cleaning The Toilet Cleanses The Soul"; Transliteration: "Benki o migaku koto kore kokoro o migaku koto nari" (Japanese: 便器を磨く事これ心を磨く事なり)	July 3, 2008
114	15	"They Say Soy Sauce On Pudding Tastes Like Sea Urchin, But Soy Sauce On Pudding Only Tastes Like Pudding And Soy Sauce"; Transliteration: "Purin ni shōyu kake tara uni no aji ga surutte iu kedo purin ni shōyu kake te mo purin to shōyu no aji shika shinai" (Japanese: プリンに醤油かけたらウニの味がするって言うけどプリンに醤油かけてもプリンと醤油の味しかしない)	July 10, 2008
115	16	"Summer Vacation Is The Most Fun Right Before It Begins"; Transliteration: "Natsuyasumi wa hajimaru mae ga ichiban tanoshii" (Japanese: 夏休みは始まる前が一番楽しい)	July 17, 2008
116	17	"The Older, The Wiser"; Transliteration: "Kamenokō yori toshinokō" (Japanese: 亀の甲より年の功)	July 24, 2008
117	18	"Beauty Is Like A Summer Fruit"; Transliteration: "Bi wa natsu no kajitsu no gotoki mono" (Japanese: 美は夏の果実の如き物)	July 31, 2008
118	19	"Even If Your Back Is Bent, Go Straight Forward"; Transliteration: "Koshi wa magatte mo massugu ni" (Japanese: 腰は曲がってもまっすぐに)	August 7, 2008
119	20	"Within Each Box Of Cigarettes, Are One Or Two Cigarettes That Smell Like Horse Dung"; Transliteration: "Tabako wa hitohako ni ichi, nihon bafun mitai na nioi no suru yatsu ga haitte iru" (Japanese: タバコは一箱に一、二本馬糞みたいな匂いのする奴が入っている)	August 14, 2008
120	21	"Japanese Restaurants Abroad Taste Pretty Much Like School Cafeteria Lunches"; Transliteration: "Kaigai no nippon ryōriten no aji wa daitai gakushoku reberu" (Japanese: 海外の日本料理店の味はだいたい学食レベル)	August 21, 2008
120	21	"Once You've Taken A Dish, You Can't Put It Back"; Transliteration: "Ichido totta sara wa modosanai" (Japanese: 一度取った皿は戻さない)	August 21, 2008
121	22	"Novices Only Need A Flathead And A Phillips"; Transliteration: "Shirōto wa purasu to mainasu dake de jūbun da" (Japanese: 素人はプラスとマイナスだけで十分だ)	August 28, 2008
122	23	"Imagination Is Nurtured In The 8th Grade"; Transliteration: "Sōzō ryoku wa chū 2 de tsuchikawareru" (Japanese: 想像力は中2で培われる)	September 4, 2008
123	24	"Always Keep A Screwdriver In Your Heart"; Transliteration: "Itsumo kokoro ni ippon no doraibā" (Japanese: いつも心に一本のドライバー)	September 11, 2008
124	25	"When Nagging Goes Too Far It Becomes Intimidating"; Transliteration: "Onedari mo do ga sugireba kyōhaku" (Japanese: おねだりも度がすぎれば脅迫)	September 18, 2008
125	26	"Entering The Final Chapter!"; Transliteration: "Saishūshō totsunyū!" (Japanese: 最終章突入!)	September 25, 2008
126	27	"Some Things Can Only Be Conveyed Through The Written Word"; Transliteration: "Moji de shika tsutawaranai mono ga aru" (Japanese: 文字でしか伝わらないものがある)	October 2, 2008
127	28	"Sometimes You Must Meet To Understand"; Transliteration: "Awanai to wakaranai koto mo aru" (Japanese: 会わないとわからないこともある)	October 9, 2008
128	29	"Sometimes You Can't Tell Just By Meeting Someone"; Transliteration: "Attemo wakaranai koto mo aru" (Japanese: 会ってもわからないこともある)	October 16, 2008
129	30	"Beware Of Food You Pick Up Off The Ground"; Transliteration: "Hiroigui ni ki o tsukero" (Japanese: 拾い食いに気をつけろ)	October 23, 2008
130	31	"Cat Lovers And Dog Lovers Are Mutually Exclusive"; Transliteration: "Nekozuki to inuzuki wa aiirenai" (Japanese: 猫好きと犬好きは相容れない)	October 30, 2008
131	32	"Fights Often Ensue During Trips"; Transliteration: "Ryokōsaki dewa daitai Kenka suru" (Japanese: 旅行先ではだいたいケンカする)	November 6, 2008
132	33	"Briefs Will Unavoidably Get Skidmarks"; Transliteration: "Burīfu no XX suji wa zettai fukahi" (Japanese: ブリーフの××筋は絶対不可避)	November 13, 2008
133	34	"Gin And His Excellency's Good-For-Nothings"; Transliteration: "Gin to kakka no gokutsubushi" (Japanese: 銀と閣下の穀潰し)	November 20, 2008
134	35	"Be Very Careful When Using Ghost Stories"; Transliteration: "Yūrei neta yaru toki wa shinchō ni" (Japanese: 幽霊ネタやる時は慎重に)	November 27, 2008
135	36	"Before Thinking About The Earth, Think About The More Endangered Gintaman's Future!"; Transliteration: "Chikyū no mae ni, motto abunai 'Gintaman' no mirai o kangaero" (Japanese: 地球の前に、もっと危ない「ギンタマン」の未来を考えろ)	December 4, 2008
136	37	"It's Your House, You Build It"; Transliteration: "Onore no ibasho wa onore de tsukuru mono nari" (Japanese: 己の居場所は己で作るものなり)	December 11, 2008
137	38	"99% Of Men Aren't Confident In Confessing Their Love"; Transliteration: "Kokuhaku ni jishin no aru otoko nante 99% inai" (Japanese: 告白に自信のある男なんて99%いない)	December 18, 2008
137	38	"People Who Don't Believe In Santa Are The Very Ones Who Want To Believe, You Contentious Bastard"; Transliteration: "Santa o shinjite inai hitobito wa, anata Basutādo wa, shinjitai yoi monodesu" (Japanese: サンタを信じていない人々は、あなた訟バスタードは、信じたい良いものです)	December 18, 2008
138	39	"Let's Talk About The Old Days Once In A While"; Transliteration: "Toki ni wa mukashi no hanashi o shiyō ka" (Japanese: 時には昔の話をしようか)	December 25, 2008
139	40	"Don't Put Your Wallet In Your Back Pocket"; Transliteration: "Saifu wa shiri poketto ni ireru na" (Japanese: 財布は尻ポケットに入れるな)	January 8, 2009
140	41	"Beware Of Those Who Use An Umbrella On A Sunny Day!"; Transliteration: "Hare no hi ni amagasa sasu yatsu niwa goyōjin" (Japanese: 晴れの日に雨傘さす奴には御用心)	January 15, 2009
141	42	"Butting Into A Fight Is Dangerous"; Transliteration: "Kenka no yokoyari wa kiken" (Japanese: ケンカの横槍は危険)	January 22, 2009
142	43	"Life Is About Making Consecutive Decisions"; Transliteration: "Jinsei wa sentakushi no renzoku" (Japanese: 人生は選択肢の連続)	January 29, 2009
143	44	"Those Who Stand On Four Legs Are Beasts. Those Who Stand On Two Legs, Guts, And Glory Are Men"; Transliteration: "Yonhon ashi de tatsu no ga kemono, nihon ashi to iji to mie de tatsu no ga otoko" (Japanese: 四本足で立つのが獣二本足と意地と見栄で立つのが男)	February 5, 2009
144	45	"Don't Trust Bedtime Stories"; Transliteration: "Nemonogatari wa shin'yō suruna" (Japanese: 寝物語は信用するな)	February 12, 2009
145	46	"The Color For Each Person's Bond Comes In Various Colors"; Transliteration: "Kizuna no iro wa jūnin toiro" (Japanese: 絆の色は十人十色)	February 19, 2009
146	47	"The Taste Of Drinking Under Broad Daylight Is Something Special"; Transliteration: "Hiruma ni nomu sake wa hitoaji chigau" (Japanese: 昼間に飲む酒は一味違う)	February 26, 2009
147	48	"All Adults Are Instructors For All Children"; Transliteration: "Subete no otonatachi wa subete no kodomotachi no insutorakutā" (Japanese: 全ての大人達は全ての子供達のインストラクター)	March 5, 2009
148	49	"Zip Up Your Fly Nice And Slowly"; Transliteration: "Chakku wa yukkuri hikiagero" (Japanese: チャックはゆっくり引きあげろ)	March 12, 2009
149	50	"When Breaking A Chuubert In Half, The End With The Knob Should Be Better. It's Also Tasty To Drink From There"; Transliteration: "Chūpatto o futatsu ni wakeru toki wa, ano motsu toko aru yatsu no hō ga nanka ii, asoko kara nomu no mo otsu" (Japanese: チューパットを二つに分ける時はあの持つトコある奴の方がなんかイイ あそこから飲むのもオツ)	March 19, 2009
150	51	"If You Can't Beat Them, Join Them"; Transliteration: "Nagai mono ni wa makarero!!" (Japanese: 長いものには巻かれろ!!)	March 26, 2009

=== Season 4 (2009–2010) ===
No. overall	No. in season	Title	Original release date
151	1	"A Conversation With A Barber, During A Haircut, Is The Most Pointless Thing In The World"; Transliteration: "Kami kiri nagara kawasareru biyōshi to no kaiwa wa sekai de ichiban dō demo ii" (Japanese: 髪切りながら交わされる美容師との会話は世界で一番どうでもいい)	April 2, 2009
152	2	"The Heavens Created Chonmage Above Man Instead Of Another Man"; Transliteration: "Ten wa hito no ue ni hito o tsukurazu mage o tsukurimashita" (Japanese: 天は人の上に人をつくらず髷をつくりました)	April 9, 2009
153	3	"Sleep Helps A Child Grow"; Transliteration: "Neru ko wa sodatsu" (Japanese: 寝る子は育つ)	April 16, 2009
154	4	"That Person Looks Different From Usual During A Birthday Party"; Transliteration: "Tanjōbikai wa itsumo no aitsu ga chigau yatsu ni mieru." (Japanese: 誕生日会はいつものアイツが違う奴に見える)	April 23, 2009
155	5	"The Other Side Of The Other Side Of The Other Side Would Be The Other Side"; Transliteration: "Ura no ura no ura wa ura." (Japanese: 裏の裏の裏は裏)	April 30, 2009
156	6	"It Takes A Bit Of Courage To Enter A Street Vendor's Stand"; Transliteration: "Yatai ni hairu ni wa bimyō ni yūki ga iru." (Japanese: 屋台に入るには微妙に勇気がいる)	May 7, 2009
157	7	"Any Place With Can Become a Battlefield When Men Gather"; Transliteration: "Otoko ga soroeba donna basho demo senjō ni naru." (Japanese: 男が揃えばどんな場所でも戦場になる)	May 14, 2009
158	8	"If A Friend Gets Injured, Take Him To The Hospital, Stat!"; Transliteration: "Tomodachi ga Kegashitara sugu ni Byōin e." (Japanese: 友達がケガしたらすぐに病院へ)	May 21, 2009
159	9	"If One Orange In The Box Is Rotten, The Rest Of Them Will Become Rotten Before You Realize It"; Transliteration: "Mikan wa Ikko Kusaru to Itsu no Ma ni ka Danbōru-jū no Mikan o Kusaraseru" (Japanese: みかんは一個腐るといつの間にかダンボール中のみかんを腐らせる)	May 28, 2009
160	10	"From A Foreigner's Perspective, You're The Foreigner. From An Alien's Perspective, You're The Alien"; Transliteration: "Gaikokujin kara Mitara Kocchi mo Gaikokujin, Uchūjin kara Mitara Kocchi mo Uchūjin" (Japanese: 外国人から見たらこっちも外国人 宇宙人から見たらこっちも宇宙人)	June 4, 2009
161	11	"Laputa's Still Good After Seeing It So Many Times"; Transliteration: "Nankai Mite mo Rapyuta wa Ii" (Japanese: 何回見てもラピュタはいい)	June 11, 2009
162	12	"Love Is Unconditional"; Transliteration: "Ai towa Mushō no Mono Nari." (Japanese: 愛とは無償のものなり)	June 18, 2009
163	13	"The Black Ships Even Make A Scene When They Sink"; Transliteration: "Kurofune wa Shizumu Toki mo Hade" (Japanese: 黒船は沈む時も派手)	June 25, 2009
164	14	"That Matsutake Soup Stuff Tastes Better Than The Real Deal"; Transliteration: "Matsutake no Osuimonotte Are Honmono Yori Umai yo ne" (Japanese: 松茸のお吸い物ってアレ ホンモノよりうまいよね)	July 2, 2009
164	14	"If a Person Is Dead, They Can't Come Back To Life"; Transliteration: "Hito wa Shindara Ikikaeranai" (Japanese: 人は死んだら生き返らない)	July 2, 2009
165	15	"If It Works Once, It'll Work Over And Over Again"; Transliteration: "Yanagi no Shita Ni Dojō wa Takusan Iru" (Japanese: 柳の下にどじょうは沢山いる)	July 9, 2009
166	16	"Two Is Better Than One. Two People Are Better Than One"; Transliteration: "Hitotsu Yori Futatsu Hitori Yori Futari" (Japanese: 一つより二つ 一人より二人)	July 16, 2009
167	17	"Smooth Polygons Smooth Men's Hearts Too"; Transliteration: "Nameraka na Porigon wa Hito no Kokoro mo Nameraka ni Suru" (Japanese: なめらかなポリゴンは人の心もなめらかにする)	July 23, 2009
168	18	"The Human Body Is Like A Little Universe"; Transliteration: "Hito no Karada wa Shōuchū" (Japanese: 人の身体は小宇宙)	July 30, 2009
169	19	"The Chosen Idiots"; Transliteration: "Michibikareshi Baka Tachi" (Japanese: 導かれしバカたち)	August 6, 2009
170	20	"And Into The Legend..."; Transliteration: "Soshite Densetsu e" (Japanese: そして伝説へ)	August 13, 2009
171	21	"If You Keep Copying, They Will Retaliate"; Transliteration: "Mane Bakari Shite Iru to Uttaerareru" (Japanese: 真似ばかりしていると訴えられる)	August 20, 2009
171	21	"A Loss Open Your Eyes To The Love You Have"; Transliteration: "Nakunatte Hajimete Wakaru Itooshisa" (Japanese: なくなって初めてわかるいとおしさ)	August 20, 2009
172	22	"Using The 'Carrot And Stick' Method Depends On The Situation"; Transliteration: "Ame to Muchi wa Tsukaiyō" (Japanese: アメとムチは使いよう)	August 27, 2009
173	23	"It's What's On The Inside That Counts"; Transliteration: "Daiji na no wa Mitame de wa Naku Nakami" (Japanese: 大事なのは見た目ではなく中身)	September 4, 2009
173	23	"It's What's On The Inside That Counts, But Only To A Certain Extent"; Transliteration: "Mitame de wa Naku Nakami to Ittemo Gendo ga Aru" (Japanese: 見た目ではなく中身といっても限度がある)	September 4, 2009
174	24	"Are There Still People Who Go To The Ocean And Yell Out 'Bakayaro'?"; Transliteration: "Umi ni Mukatte Bakayarō toka Iu Hito tte Mada Iru no Darō ka" (Japanese: 海に向かってバカヤローとか言う人ってまだいるのだろうか)	September 10, 2009
174	24	"When A Person Is Trapped, Their Inner Door Opens"; Transliteration: "Hito wa Tojikomerareru to Jibun no Naka no Tobira ga Hiraku" (Japanese: 人は閉じ込められると自分の中の扉が開く)	September 10, 2009
175	25	"No Matter How Old You Get, You Still Hate The Dentist!"; Transliteration: "Ikutsu ni Nattemo Haisha wa Iya" (Japanese: 幾つになっても歯医者は嫌)	September 17, 2009
176	26	"Countdown Begins"; Transliteration: "Kaunto Daun Kaishi" (Japanese: カウントダウン開始)	September 24, 2009
177	27	"It's Bad Luck To See A Spider At Night"; Transliteration: "Yoru no Kumo wa Engi ka Warui" (Japanese: 夜の蜘蛛は縁起が悪い)	October 1, 2009
178	28	"Once You're Entangled In A Spiderweb, It's Hard To Get It Off"; Transliteration: "Kumo no ito wa ichido karamaru to nakanaka torenai" (Japanese: 蜘蛛の糸は一度絡まるとなかなかとれない)	October 8, 2009
179	29	"It's The Irresponsible One Who's Scary When Pissed"; Transliteration: "Charanporan na yatsu hodo ikaru to kowai" (Japanese: チャランポランな奴程怒ると恐い)	October 15, 2009
180	30	"The More Precious The Burden, The Heavier And More Difficult It Is To Shoulder It"; Transliteration: "Taisetsu na ni hodo omoku seoi gatai" (Japanese: 大切な荷ほど重く背負い難い)	October 22, 2009
181	31	"Watch Out For A Set Of Women And A Drink"; Transliteration: "Sake to onna wa wansetto de ki o tsukero" (Japanese: 酒と女はワンセットで気をつけろ)	October 29, 2009
182	32	"Screw Popularity Votes"; Transliteration: "Ninkitouhyou nante kuso kurae" (Japanese: 人気投票なんて糞食らえ)	November 5, 2009
183	33	"Popularity Polls Can Burn In Hell"; Transliteration: "Ninkitouhyou nante moete hai ni nare" (Japanese: 人気投票なんて燃えて灰になれ)	November 12, 2009
184	34	"Popularity Polls Can..."; Transliteration: "Ninkitouhyou nante ..." (Japanese: 人気投票なんて･･･)	November 19, 2009
185	35	"Hometowns And Boobs Are Best Thought From Afar"; Transliteration: "Kokyou to oppai wa tooku ni arite omou mono" (Japanese: 故郷とおっぱいは遠くにありて思うもの)	November 26, 2009
185	35	"The Whole Peeing On A Bee Sting Is A Myth. You'll Get Germs, So Don't Do It!!"; Transliteration: "Hachi ni sasaretara shouben kakerotte are ha meishin desu baikin ga hairu kara ki o tsukeyou ne!!" (Japanese: 蜂に刺されたら小便かけろってアレは迷信です バイ菌が入るから気をつけようね！！)	November 26, 2009
186	36	"Beware Of Foreshadows"; Transliteration: "Shibou furagu ni ki o tsukero" (Japanese: 死亡フラグに気をつけろ)	December 3, 2009
187	37	"It's Goodbye Once A Flag Is Set"; Transliteration: "Furagu o fundara sayounara" (Japanese: フラグを踏んだらサヨウナラ)	December 10, 2009
188	38	"An Observation Journal Should Be Seen Through To The Very End"; Transliteration: "Kansatsu Nikki wa Saigo made Yarikirou" (Japanese: 観察日記は最後までやりきろう)	December 17, 2009
189	39	"It's Better To Take Care Of This Year's Business Within The Year, But Once The Year Is About To End, You Figure That You Might As Well Put It Off Till Next Year For A Fresh Start. That's How The End Of The Year Goes"; Transliteration: "Kotoshi dekiru Koto wa Kotoshijuu ni Yacchatta Hou ga Kugiri iindakedo Tsui Rainen kara Shikirinaosha Iiyatte Omotte Atomawashi ni Shiteshimau no ga Nenmatsu no Oyakusoku" (Japanese: 今年できる事は今年中にやっちゃった方が区切りいいんだけど つい来年から仕切り直しゃいーやって思って後回しにしてしまうのが年末のお約束)	December 24, 2009
189	39	"Radio Exercises Are Socials For Boys And Girls"; Transliteration: "Rajio Taisou wa Shounen Shoujo no Shakouba" (Japanese: ラジオ体操は少年少女の社交場)	December 24, 2009
190	40	"When Looking For Something, Try Using Its Perspective"; Transliteration: "Sagashi mono o suru toki wa soitsu no mesen ni natte sagase" (Japanese: 捜しものをする時はそいつの目線になって捜せ)	January 7, 2010
191	41	"Freedom Means To Live True To Yourself, Not Without Law!"; Transliteration: "Jiyū to wa muhou de wa naku onore no rūru de ikiru koto" (Japanese: 自由とは無法ではなく己のルールで生きること)	January 14, 2010
192	42	"Kabukicho Stray Cat Blues"; Transliteration: "Kabuki-chou Noraneko Burūsu" (Japanese: かぶき町野良猫ブルース)	January 21, 2010
193	43	"Cooking Is About Guts"; Transliteration: "Ryouri wa Konjou" (Japanese: 料理は根性)	January 28, 2010
194	44	"Whenever I Hear Leviathan, I Think Of Sazae-san. Stupid Me!!"; Transliteration: "Rivaiasan tte kitara doushitemo Sazae-san ga chiratsuku ore no baka!!" (Japanese: リヴァイアサンってきいたらどうしてもサザエさんがチラつく俺のバカ！！)	February 4, 2010
195	45	"Not Losing To The Rain"; Transliteration: "Ame ni mo makezu" (Japanese: 雨ニモ負ケズ)	February 11, 2010
196	46	"Not Losing To The Wind"; Transliteration: "Kaze ni mo makezu" (Japanese: 風ニモ負ケズ)	February 18, 2010
197	47	"Not Losing To The Storm"; Transliteration: "Arashi ni mo makezu" (Japanese: 嵐ニモ負ケズ)	February 25, 2010
198	48	"Never Losing That Smile"; Transliteration: "Ikanaru Toki ni mo Egao o Tayasanai" (Japanese: イカナル時ニモ笑顔ヲ絶ヤサナイ)	March 4, 2010
199	49	"That's How I Wish To Be, Beautiful And Strong"; Transliteration: "Sonna Tsuyoku Utsukushi Mono ni Watashi wa Naritai" (Japanese: ソンナ強ク美シイモノニ私ハナリタイ)	March 11, 2010
200	50	"Santa Claus Red Is Blood Red"; Transliteration: "Santa Kurōsu no Aka wa Chi no Iro" (Japanese: サンタクロースの赤は血の色)	March 18, 2010
201	51	"Everybody's A Santa"; Transliteration: "Jinrui mina Santa!" (Japanese: 人類みなサンタ!)	March 25, 2010

=== Gintama' (2011–12) ===
No. overall	No. in season	Title	Original release date
202	1	"Everyone Looks a Little Grown Up After Spring Break"; Transliteration: "Haruyasumi Ake wa Minna Chotto Otona ni Mieru" (Japanese: 春休み明けは皆ちょっと大人に見える)	April 4, 2011
203	2	"Everyone Looks Pretty Grown Up After Summer Break"; Transliteration: "Natsuyasumi Ake mo Minna Kekkou Otona ni Mieru" (Japanese: 夏休み明けも皆けっこう大人に見える)	April 11, 2011
204	3	"Use a Calligraphy Pen for New Year's Cards"; Transliteration: "Nengajō wa Fudepen de Ike" (Japanese: 年賀状は筆ペンでいけ)	April 18, 2011
204	3	"The Heart Comes before Chocolate"; Transliteration: "Kakao Yori Kokoro" (Japanese: カカオよりココロ)	April 18, 2011
205	4	"Meals Should Be Balanced"; Transliteration: "Shokuji wa Baransu o Kangaero" (Japanese: 食事はバランスを考えろ)	April 25, 2011
205	4	"We Are All Warriors in the Battle against Fate"; Transliteration: "Hito wa Mina Unmei to Tatakau Senshi" (Japanese: 人は皆運命と戦う戦士)	April 25, 2011
206	5	"It's Too Confusing When Talking about the Poster Girl for a Poster Store, So Call Her a Sandwich Board"; Transliteration: "Kanban'ya no Kanbanmusume wa Mou Mendou Nande Nimai no Ita to Yobe" (Japanese: 看板屋の看板娘はもう面倒なんで二枚の板と呼べ)	May 2, 2011
207	6	"Glasses Are Part of the Soul"; Transliteration: "Megane wa Tamashii no Ichibu Desu" (Japanese: メガネは魂の一部です)	May 9, 2011
208	7	"Glasses Prevent You from Seeing Certain Things"; Transliteration: "Megane ja Mienai Mono ga Aru" (Japanese: メガネじゃ見えないものがある)	May 16, 2011
209	8	"Nothing Lasts Forever, including Parents, Money, Youth, Your Room, Dress Shirts, Me, You, and the Gintama Anime"; Transliteration: "Itsumade mo Aru to Omouna Oya to Kane to Heya to Y-shatsu to Watashi to Anata to Anime Gintama" (Japanese: いつまでもあると思うな親と金と若さと部屋とYシャツと私とあなたとアニメ銀魂)	May 23, 2011
210	9	"A Lawless Town Tends to Attract a Bunch of Whoohooey Folk"; Transliteration: "Muhō no Machi ni Tsudou wa Kyahhō na Yatsu Bakari" (Japanese: 無法の街に集うはキャッホーな奴ばかり)	May 30, 2011
211	10	"Ghosts Aren't the Only Ones Who Run Wild Around Graveyards"; Transliteration: "Hakaba de Abareru no wa Yūrei dake de wa nai" (Japanese: 墓場で暴れるのは幽霊だけではない)	June 6, 2011
212	11	"Chains of a Warrior"; Transliteration: "Otoko no Kusari" (Japanese: 侠の鎖)	June 13, 2011
213	12	"Iron Town"; Transliteration: "Tetsu no Machi" (Japanese: 鉄の街)	June 20, 2011
214	13	"'Tis an Honor!"; Transliteration: "Ohikae nasutte!" (Japanese: お控えなすって!)	June 27, 2011
215	14	"Odds or Evens"; Transliteration: "Chō ka Han ka" (Japanese: 丁か半か)	July 4, 2011
216	15	"I Can't Remember a Damn Thing About the Factory Tour"; Transliteration: "Kōjō Kengaku toka Shōjiki Hitotsu taritomo Kioku ni Nokotte nee" (Japanese: 工場見学とか正直一つたりとも記憶に残ってねェ)	July 11, 2011
217	16	"What Happens Twice Can Happen Thrice"; Transliteration: "Nido aru Koto wa Sando aru" (Japanese: 二度ある事は三度ある)	July 18, 2011
218	17	"The Claws of a Crab Can Snip Through a Friendship"; Transliteration: "Kani no Hasami wa Kizuna o Tatsu Hasami" (Japanese: カニのハサミは絆を断つハサミ)	July 25, 2011
219	18	"People Forget to Return Stuff All the Time Without Even Realizing It"; Transliteration: "Hito wa Shiranai Uchi ni Karipaku to iu Tsumi o Okashite iru" (Japanese: 人はしらないうちに借りパクという罪を犯している)	August 1, 2011
219	18	"We Ended Kind of Early So We're Gonna Start the Next Episode (Take Two)"; Transliteration: "Dainikai Nanka Hayaku Owatchatta node Jikai no Hanashi o Hajimechaou" (Japanese: 第2回 なんか早く終わっちゃったので次回の話をはじめちゃおう)	August 1, 2011
220	19	"The Bathhouse, Where You're Naked in Body and Soul"; Transliteration: "Sentō de wa Mi mo Kokoro mo Maruhadaka" (Japanese: 銭湯では身も心も丸裸)	August 8, 2011
221	20	"Jugem"; Transliteration: "Jugemu" (Japanese: 寿限無)	August 15, 2011
222	21	"The Name Reveals the Person"; Transliteration: "Na wa Tai o Arawasu" (Japanese: 名は体を表す)	August 22, 2011
223	22	"The Man's Household Situation Is Hard, His Heart Is Soft"; Transliteration: "Ossan no Katei Jijō wa Daibu Hādo Hāto wa Sofuto" (Japanese: おっさんの家庭事情は大分ハード ハートはソフト)	August 29, 2011
224	23	"Blue and Red Ecstasy"; Transliteration: "Aka to Ao no Ekusutashī" (Japanese: 青と赤のエクスタシー)	September 5, 2011
225	24	"So in the Second Season of Prison Break, They've Already Broken Out of Prison, But the Name Works Once You Realize That Society Is a Prison"; Transliteration: "Pu**zunbu**iku shīzun 2 tte tashikani mō puri*** bure*ku shi terukedo are wa kono kusatta shakai ga purizun tte kotodakara pu**zunbu**ikude iinda yo" (Japanese: プ○ズンブ×イクシーズン2って確かにもうプリ××ブレ○クしてるけどあれはこの腐った社会がプリズンってことだからプ○ズンブ×イクでいいんだよ)	September 12, 2011
226	25	"Everybody Loves Pajamas"; Transliteration: "Hito wa Mina Pajamakko" (Japanese: 人は皆パジャマっ子)	September 19, 2011
227	26	"Speaking of Crossovers, Don't Forget About Alien vs. Predator"; Transliteration: "Korabo ni wa Eiri*n vs Pu**detā ga Aru no mo Oboeteoke" (Japanese: コラボにはエイリ○ンVSプ×デターがあるのも覚えておけ)	September 26, 2011
228	27	"Love Is Neither Plus Nor Minus"; Transliteration: "Ai ni Purasu mo Mainasu mo Nashi" (Japanese: 愛にプラスもマイナスもなし)	October 3, 2011
229	28	"Making It Through Love"; Transliteration: "Wataru Seken wa Ai bakari" (Japanese: 渡る世間は愛ばかり)	October 10, 2011
230	29	"It Would Take Too Much Effort to Make This Title Sound Like a Text Message Subject"; Transliteration: "Koko no Taitoru mo Mēru no Taitoru mitaina Toko mo Kangaeru no Mendokusa" (Japanese: ここのタイトルもメールのタイトルみたいなトコも考えるのメンド臭)	October 17, 2011
231	30	"When You Go to a Funeral for the First Time, You're Surprised By How Happy the People Are"; Transliteration: "Sōshiki tte Hajimete Iku to Igai to Minna Akarukute Bikkuri suru" (Japanese: 葬式って初めていくと意外とみんな明るくてビックリする)	October 24, 2011
232	31	"The People You Tend to Forget Tend to Show Up After You Forget Them"; Transliteration: "Wasureppoi Yatsu wa Wasureta Koro ni Yattekuru" (Japanese: 忘れっぽい奴は忘れた頃にやってくる)	October 31, 2011
233	32	"Space Ururun Homestay"; Transliteration: "Uchū Bururun Taizaiki" (Japanese: 宇宙ブルルン滞在記)	November 7, 2011
234	33	"Piggy Banks and Trash Cans"; Transliteration: "Senryōbako to Garakuta no Hako" (Japanese: 千両箱とガラクタの箱)	November 14, 2011
235	34	"Empty Planet"; Transliteration: "Kara no Hoshi" (Japanese: 空の星)	November 21, 2011
236	35	"Don't Say Goodbye Lionel"; Transliteration: "Sayonara-ioneru nanka iwasenai" (Japanese: さよなライオネルなんか言わせない)	November 28, 2011
237	36	"Please Take Me Skiing"; Transliteration: "Sessha o Sukī ni Tsuretette" (Japanese: 拙者をスキーにつれてって)	December 5, 2011
238	37	"A Vacation in Disorientation"; Transliteration: "Ian Ryokō wa Iyan Dokō?" (Japanese: 慰安旅行はイヤンどこォ?)	December 12, 2011
239	38	"You Know Those Year-End Parties Where You Keep Drinking until You've Forgotten Everything That Happened the Past Year? There Are a Few Things You're Not Supposed to Forget"; Transliteration: "Bōnenkai demo Wasurecha Ikenai Mono ga Aru" (Japanese: 忘年会でも忘れちゃいけないものがある)	December 19, 2011
240	39	"People Can Only Live By Forgetting the Bad"; Transliteration: "Hito wa Wasureru Koto de Ikite Ikeru" (Japanese: 人は忘れることで生きていける)	December 26, 2011
241	40	"We Are All Hosts, in Capital Letters"; Transliteration: "Arufabetto Hyōki de Jinrui Mina Hosuto" (Japanese: アルファベット表記で人類みなホスト)	January 9, 2012
242	41	"Girls Like Vegeta, Guys Like Piccolo"; Transliteration: "Onna wa Bejīta-zuki Otoko wa Pikkoro-zuki" (Japanese: 女はベジータ好き 男はピッコロ好き)	January 16, 2012
243	42	"Draw Your Life on the Canvas We Call Manga"; Transliteration: "Manga toiu Kyanbasu ni Jinsei toiu Fude de E o Kake" (Japanese: 漫画という画布に人生という筆で絵を描け)	January 23, 2012
244	43	"Check It Out!!"; Transliteration: "Chekera!!" (Japanese: チェケラ!!)	January 30, 2012
245	44	"Thorny and Rosy"; Transliteration: "Ibara-gaki to Bara-gaki" (Japanese: 茨ガキと薔薇ガキ)	February 6, 2012
246	45	"Festival of Thornies"; Transliteration: "Warugaki domo no Saiten" (Japanese: 悪ガキどもの祭典)	February 13, 2012
247	46	"Letter from Thorny"; Transliteration: "Baragaki kara no Tegami" (Japanese: バラガキからの手紙)	February 20, 2012
248	47	"Madaodog Madaonaire"; Transliteration: "Madaodoggu Madaonea" (Japanese: マダオドッグマダオネア)	February 27, 2012
249	48	"Presents Are Meant to Be Given Early"; Transliteration: "Okurimono wa Ohayame ni" (Japanese: 贈り物はお早めに)	March 5, 2012
250	49	"New Year's Envelopes Are Perfect for Dirty Jokes"; Transliteration: "Otoshidama wa ****neta tono Aishō ga Batsugun" (Japanese: お年玉は×ネタとの相性がバツグン)	March 12, 2012
251	50	"When Sleeping Under a Kotatsu, Make Sure You Don't Burn Your Balls"; Transliteration: "Kotatsu de neru Toki wa ***tama Nesshinai you Ki o Tsukero" (Japanese: コタツで寝るときは○玉熱しないよう気をつけろ)	March 19, 2012
252	51	"We're Sorry"; Transliteration: "Gomennasai" (Japanese: ごめんなさい)	March 26, 2012

=== Gintama': Enchōsen (2012–13) ===
No. overall	No. in season	Title	Original release date
253	1	"Nobody with Natural Straight Hair Can Be That Bad/Nobody with Straight Blond Hair Can Be That Good"; Transliteration: "Sutorēto Pāma ni Warui Yatsu wa Inai/Kinpatsu Sutopā ni Roku na Yatsu wa Inai" (Japanese: ストレートパーマに悪い奴はいない/金パツストパーにロクな奴はいない)	October 4, 2012
254	2	"Kintoki and Gintoki"; Transliteration: "Kintoki to Gintoki" (Japanese: 金時と銀時)	October 11, 2012
255	3	"Kin-san's Kintama"; Transliteration: "Kin-san no Kin○" (Japanese: 金さんの金○)	October 18, 2012
256	4	"The Meaning of a Main Character"; Transliteration: "Shujinkō to wa" (Japanese: 主人公とは)	October 25, 2012
257	5	"Courtesan Turns the Tables"; Transliteration: "Keisei Gyakuten" (Japanese: 傾城逆転)	January 10, 2013
258	6	"Inside the Palace!!"; Transliteration: "Denchūdegozaru!!" (Japanese: 殿中でござる!!)	January 17, 2013
259	7	"Five Pinkies"; Transliteration: "Go-hon no yubi" (Japanese: 5本の指)	January 24, 2013
260	8	"Pinky Swear"; Transliteration: "Shinjūdate" (Japanese: 心中立て)	January 31, 2013
261	9	"Unsetting Moon"; Transliteration: "Shizumanu Tsuki" (Japanese: 沈まぬ月)	February 7, 2013
262	10	"Sound Of Beam Can Pierce Heart Of Everyone"; Transliteration: "Bīmu toiu Hibiki wa Arayuru mono no Hāto o Inuku" (Japanese: ビームという響きはあらゆる者のハートを射抜く)	March 7, 2013
263	11	"Two Brothers"; Transliteration: "Futari no Aniki" (Japanese: 二人のアニキ)	March 14, 2013
264	12	"Liquor and Gasoline, Smiles and Tears"; Transliteration: "Sake to Gasorin to Egao to Namida" (Japanese: 酒とガソリンと笑顔と涙)	March 21, 2013
265	13	"Dog Food Doesn't Have As Much Flavor As You'd Think"; Transliteration: "Doggu Fūdo wa Mitame Yori Aji ga Usui" (Japanese: ドッグフードは見た目より味がうすい)	March 28, 2013

=== Gintama° (2015–16) ===
No. overall	No. in season	Title	Original release date
266	1	"You can never Pause at the Perfect Time"; Transliteration: "Ichiji teishi wa Umai guai ni wa Tomaranai" (Japanese: 一時停止はうまい具合には止まらない)	April 8, 2015
267	2	"Even a Matsui Stick Can't Handle Some Kinds of Dirt"; Transliteration: "Matsui Bou demo Torenai Gomi ga Aru" (Japanese: マツイ棒でもとれないゴミがある)	April 15, 2015
268	3	"An Inspector's Love begins with an Inspection"; Transliteration: "Kansatsu no Koi wa Kansatsu Kara Hajimaru" (Japanese: 監察の恋は観察から始まる)	April 22, 2015
269	4	"Forget Dates, Remember People"; Transliteration: "Nengou Anki yori Ningen Yakitsukero" (Japanese: 年号暗記より人間焼きつけろ)	April 29, 2015
269	4	"You Can Hide Your Porn Mags But You Can't Hide Your ***" Transliteration: "Ero Hon Kakushite OOO Kakusazu" (Japanese: エロ本隠して○○○隠さず)	April 29, 2015
270	5	"A Mirror Provides a Frozen Reflection of Both Your Beautiful and Ugly Sides"; Transliteration: "Kagami wa Bi mo Shū mo Ari no Mama o Utsushidasu" (Japanese: 鏡は美も醜もありのままを映し出す)	May 6, 2015
270	5	"Nobody Likes the Photo on Their License"; Transliteration: "Menkyoshō no Shashin o Ki ni Itteru Yatsu wa Kaimu" (Japanese: 免許証の写真を気に入ってる奴は皆無)	May 6, 2015
271	6	"Arriving Late to a Reunion Makes it Hard to Enter"; Transliteration: "Dousoukai wa Okurete Kuru to Hairizurai" (Japanese: 同窓会は遅れてくると入りづらい)	May 13, 2015
272	7	"A Reunion Also Brings to the Surface Things You Don't Want to Remember"; Transliteration: "Dousoukai wa Omoidashitakunai Omoide mo Yomigaette Kuru" (Japanese: 同窓会は思い出したくもない思い出も蘇ってくる)	May 20, 2015
273	8	"When Compared to Time in the Heavens, Fifty Years of Human Life Resembles Naught but Dreams and Lottery Tickets"; Transliteration: "Ningen Gojuu Nen Geten no Uchi o Kurabureba Yume Takarakuji no Gotoku Nari" (Japanese: 人間五十年下天のうちをくらぶれば夢宝くじの如くなり)	May 27, 2015
274	9	"Guys With Big Nostrils Also Have Big Imaginations"; Transliteration: "Hana no Ana no Dekai Yatsu wa Hasso-Ryoku mo Dekai" (Japanese: 鼻の穴のデカイ奴は発想力もデカイ)	June 3, 2015
274	9	"You Never Accept a New Sentai Series at the Start, But By the Final Episode, You Don't Want It to End"; Transliteration: "Atarashiku Hajimaru Sentai Mono wa Saisho wa Konna no Mitome ne Mitai ni Natte Iruga Saishukai no Koro ni wa Hanaretakunaku Natte Iru" (Japanese: 新しく始まる戦隊モノは最初はこんなの認めねェみたいになっているが最終回の頃には離れたくなくなっている)	June 3, 2015
275	10	"9 + 1 = Yagyu Jyubei"; Transliteration: "9 + 1 = Yagyū Juubee" (Japanese: ９＋１＝柳生十兵衛)	June 10, 2015
276	11	"Calories Come Back to Bite You Just When You've Forgotten About Them"; Transliteration: "Karori wa Wasureta Koro ni Yattekuru" (Japanese: カロリーは忘れた頃にやってくる)	June 17, 2015
277	12	"10 - 1 =" (Japanese: 10 - 1 =)	June 24, 2015
278	13	"All Mothers Pack Too Much Food Into a Lunch Box and Ruin the Shape"; Transliteration: "Kachan no Bento wa Itsumo Tsume Sugite Jakkan Tsuburete Iru" (Japanese: 母ちゃんの弁当はいつもつめすぎて若干つぶれている)	July 1, 2015
279	14	"The Reaper by Day and the Reaper by Night"; Transliteration: "Asa to Yoru no Shinigami" (Japanese: 朝と夜の死神)	July 8, 2015
280	15	"Human or Demon?"; Transliteration: "Oni ka Hito ka" (Japanese: 鬼か人か)	July 15, 2015
281	16	"Farewell, Reaper"; Transliteration: "Saraba Shinigami" (Japanese: さらば死神)	July 22, 2015
282	17	"A Phoenix Rises from the Ashes Over and Over"; Transliteration: "Fenikkusu wa Nando mo Yomigaeru" (Japanese: フェニックスは何度も蘇る)	July 29, 2015
283	18	"Amen"; Transliteration: "Āmen" (Japanese: アーメン)	August 5, 2015
284	19	"Being a Leader Is Tough"; Transliteration: "Rīdā wa Tsurai yo" (Japanese: リーダーは辛いよ)	August 12, 2015
285	20	"Love Is a Roach Motel"; Transliteration: "Koi wa Gokiburi Poipoi" (Japanese: 恋はゴキブリポイポイ)	August 19, 2015
286	21	"A Sizzle Summer"; Transliteration: "Begirama na Natsu" (Japanese: ベギラマな夏)	August 26, 2015
286	21	"A Nothing Summer, 2015"; Transliteration: "Nanimo Nee yo Natsu 2015" (Japanese: 何もねぇよ夏2015)	August 26, 2015
287	22	"I'm the Mayo Guy, and He's the Sweet Tooth"; Transliteration: "Ore ga Mayoraa de, Aitsu ga Amatou de" (Japanese: おれがマヨラーで あいつが甘党で)	September 2, 2015
288	23	"I'm a Failure as a Leader and He's Also a Failure as a Leader"; Transliteration: "Ore ga Leader Shikkaku de, Aitsu mo Leader Shikkaku de" (Japanese: おれがリーダー失格で あいつもリーダー失格で)	September 9, 2015
289	24	"I'm Yorozuya and He's Shinsengumi"; Transliteration: "Ore ga Yorozuya de, Aitsu ga Shinsengumi de" (Japanese: おれが万事屋で あいつが真選組で)	September 16, 2015
290	25	"Always Leave Enough Room for Fifty Million in Your Bag"; Transliteration: "Baggu wa Tsune ni Gosenman Hairu Youni Aketeoke" (Japanese: バッグは常に５千万入るようにあけておけ)	September 23, 2015
291	26	"Always Leave Enough Room for Pebbles in Your Bag"; Transliteration: "Baggu wa Tsune ni Ishicoro ga Hairu Youni Aketeoke" (Japanese: バッグは常に石ころが入るようにあけておけ)	September 30, 2015
292	27	"Style Goes Out of Fashion the Moment It's Put Into Words"; Transliteration: "Oshare to wa Oshare to Kotoba ni Shita Jiten de Kakikieru Mononari" (Japanese: オシャレとはオシャレと言葉にした時点でかき消えるものなり)	October 7, 2015
292	27	"There Are Two Types of People In This World: Those Who Yell Out Their Attack Names, and Those Who Don't"; Transliteration: "Yononaka ni wa Nishurui no Ningen ga iru sore wa Hissatsuwaza o Sakebu Ningen to Sakebanai Ningen da" (Japanese: 世の中には二種類の人間がいる それは必殺技を叫ぶ人間と叫ばない人間だ)	October 7, 2015
293	28	"The Two Apes"; Transliteration: "Futari no Etekō" (Japanese: 二人の猿公)	October 14, 2015
294	29	"Afros of Life and Death"; Transliteration: "Sei to Shi no Afuro" (Japanese: 生と死のアフロ)	October 21, 2015
295	30	"Afuro and Wolfro"; Transliteration: "Afurō to Afurō" (Japanese: 阿腐郎とアフ狼)	October 28, 2015
296	31	"Take the Initial Premise Lightly, and It'll Cost You"; Transliteration: "Shoki Settei wa Nametara Inochitori" (Japanese: 初期設定はナメたら命取り)	November 4, 2015
297	32	"Keep Your Farewells Short"; Transliteration: "Wakare no Aisatsu wa Kanketsu ni" (Japanese: 別れの挨拶は簡潔に)	November 11, 2015
298	33	"One Editor Is Enough"; Transliteration: "Tantō Henshū wa Hitori de Tariru" (Japanese: 担当編集は一人で足りる)	November 18, 2015
298	33	"The G-Pen Is Capricious, and the Maru Pen Is Stubborn"; Transliteration: "Jīpen wa Kimagure-ya-san Tamapen wa Ganko-sha" (Japanese: Gペンは気まぐれ屋さん丸ペンは頑固者)	November 18, 2015
299	34	"Strike When the Sword and Overlord are Hot"; Transliteration: "Tetsu to Maō wa Atsui Uchi ni Ute" (Japanese: 鉄と魔王は熱いうちに打て)	November 25, 2015
299	34	"Oil Rain"; Transliteration: "Oiru no Ame" (Japanese: オイルの雨)	November 25, 2015
300	35	"Shogun of Light and Shadow"; Transliteration: "Hikari to kage no Shōgun" (Japanese: 光と影の将軍)	December 2, 2015
301	36	"Ninja Village"; Transliteration: "Shinobi no Kuni" (Japanese: 忍の里)	December 9, 2015
302	37	"Ninja Soul"; Transliteration: "Shinobi no Tamashī" (Japanese: 忍の魂)	December 16, 2015
303	38	"And Then There Were Five"; Transliteration: "Saigo no go-nin" (Japanese: 最後の5人)	December 23, 2015
304	39	"Those Who Protect Against All Odds"; Transliteration: "Yorozu o Mamoru-mono-tachi" (Japanese: 万事を護る者達)	January 6, 2016
305	40	"Sworn Enemy"; Transliteration: "Kataki" (Japanese: 仇)	January 13, 2016
306	41	"The Crows Caw After The Battle Ends"; Transliteration: "Ikusa no Ato ni wa Karasu ga Naku" (Japanese: 戦のあとには烏が哭く)	January 20, 2016
307	42	"Farewell, Buddy"; Transliteration: "Saraba Dachi kō" (Japanese: さらばダチ公)	January 27, 2016
308	43	"The Day the Demon Cried"; Transliteration: "Oni ga Naita Hi" (Japanese: 鬼が哭いた日)	February 3, 2016
309	44	"Heroes Always Arrive Fashionably Late"; Transliteration: "Hīrō wa Okurete Yatte Kuru" (Japanese: ヒーローは遅れてやってくる)	February 10, 2016
310	45	"Lost and Found"; Transliteration: "Wasuremono" (Japanese: 忘れもの)	February 17, 2016
311	46	"Prison Break"; Transliteration: "Datsugoku" (Japanese: 脱獄)	February 24, 2016
311	46	"Essay Manga Are Easy to Animate"; Transliteration: "Essei manga wa sakuga-raku" (Japanese: エッセイ漫画は作画楽)	February 24, 2016
312	47	"Stray Dogs"; Transliteration: "Norainu" (Japanese: 野良犬)	March 2, 2016
313	48	"Undelivered Mail"; Transliteration: "Todokanakatta mēru" (Japanese: 届かなかったメール)	March 9, 2016
314	49	"Karma"; Transliteration: "Gou" (Japanese: 業)	March 16, 2016
315	50	"Nobume"; Transliteration: "Nobume" (Japanese: 信女)	March 23, 2016
316	51	"Farewell Shinsengumi"; Transliteration: "Saraba Shinsengumi" (Japanese: さらば真選組)	March 30, 2016

=== Gintama. (2017) ===
No. overall	No. in season	Title	Original release date (Note: TV Tokyo listed its air dates on Sunday at 25:35, which is effectively Monday at 1:35 JST.)
317	1	"The Monster and the Monster's Child"; Transliteration: "Bakemono to Bakemono no Ko" (Japanese: 化物と化物の子)	January 9, 2017
318	2	"Leave Letter"; Transliteration: "Kyūka-todoke" (Japanese: 休暇届)	January 16, 2017
319	3	"The Song of Samurai"; Transliteration: "Bushi no Uta" (Japanese: 武士の唄)	January 23, 2017
320	4	"Zura"; Transliteration: "Zura" (Japanese: ヅラ)	January 30, 2017
321	5	"The Two Fools"; Transliteration: "Utsukemono Futari" (Japanese: うつけもの二人)	February 6, 2017
322	6	"Ten Years"; Transliteration: "10-Nen" (Japanese: 10年)	February 13, 2017
323	7	"Paths"; Transliteration: "Hōhō" (Japanese: 方法)	February 20, 2017
324	8	"Master of Kouan"; Transliteration: "Kōan no Nushi" (Japanese: 徨安のヌシ)	February 27, 2017
325	9	"The Lost Rabbit"; Transliteration: "Mayoi Usagi" (Japanese: まよい兎)	March 6, 2017
326	10	"Siblings"; Transliteration: "Kyoudai" (Japanese: 兄弟)	March 13, 2017
327	11	"First Student"; Transliteration: "Ichiban deshi" (Japanese: 一番弟子)	March 20, 2017
328	12	"Hope"; Transliteration: "Kibou" (Japanese: 希望)	March 27, 2017

=== Gintama. Porori-hen (2017) ===
No. overall	No. in season	Title	Original release date (Note: TV Tokyo listed its air dates on Sunday at 25:35, which is effectively Monday at 1:35 JST.)
329	1	"The Stairs to Adulthood May Not Always Lead Up"; Transliteration: "Otona no Kaidan wa Nobori Kaidan to wa Kagiranai" (Japanese: 大人の階段は昇り階段とは限らない)	October 2, 2017
330	2	"My Bald Dad, My Light-Haired Dad, and My Dad's Glasses"; Transliteration: "Hageta Otousan to Shiraga no Otousan to Otousan no Megane" (Japanese: ハゲたお父さんと白髪のお父さんとお父さんのメガネ)	October 9, 2017
331	3	"A Bowl of Ramen"; Transliteration: "Ippai no Ramen" (Japanese: 一杯のラーメン)	October 16, 2017
332	4	"A Family"; Transliteration: "Hitotsu no Kazoku" (Japanese: 一つのかぞく)	October 23, 2017
333	5	"Life, Death, and Shades"; Transliteration: "Sei to Shi no Gurasan" (Japanese: 生と死のグラサン)	October 30, 2017
333	5	"All the Answers Can Be Found in the Field"; Transliteration: "Subete no Kotae wa genba ni Aru" (Japanese: 全ての答えは現場にある)	October 30, 2017
334	6	"3000 Leagues in Search of a Scabbard"; Transliteration: "Saya o Tazunete Sanzenri" (Japanese: 鞘をたずねて三千里)	November 6, 2017
335	7	"The Super Sadist and the Super Sadist"; Transliteration: "Do-S to Do-S" (Japanese: ドSとドS)	November 13, 2017
336	8	"The Strongest Sword, and the Dullest Sword"; Transliteration: "Saikyou no Ken to Saitei no Namakura" (Japanese: 最強の剣と最低の鈍)	November 20, 2017
337	9	"Wash Your Hands Before a Handshake"; Transliteration: "Akushu no Mae wa Te o Arae" (Japanese: 握手の前は手を洗え)	November 27, 2017
338	10	"Diamonds are Unscratchable"; Transliteration: "Daiyamondo wa Kizutsukanai" (Japanese: ダイヤモンドは傷つかない)	December 4, 2017
339	11	"An Idol's Badge of Honor"; Transliteration: "Aidoru no kunshō" (Japanese: アイドルの勲章)	December 11, 2017
340	12	"The Line Between Godlike Games and Shitty Games Is Paper-Thin"; Transliteration: "Kami Gee to Kuso Gee wa Kamihitoe" (Japanese: 神ゲーと糞ゲーは紙一重)	December 18, 2017
340	12	"Glasses Are a Part of the Soul"; Transliteration: "Megane wa Tamashii no Ichibu" (Japanese: メガネは魂の一部)	December 18, 2017
341	13	"Guardian Spirits Are Also a Part of the Soul"; Transliteration: "Shugorei mo Tamashii no Ichibu" (Japanese: 守護霊も魂の一部)	December 25, 2017

=== Gintama. Shirogane no Tamashii-hen (2018) ===
No. overall	No. in season	Title	Original release date (Note: TV Tokyo listed its air dates on Sunday at 25:35, which is effectively Monday at 1:35 JST.)
342	1	"Try As You Might to Make a Natural Perm Go Away, It Will Always Return"; Transliteration: "Tennen Pāma wa Gunyagunya Magatte mo Modotte Kuru" (Japanese: 天然パーマはグニャグニャ曲がっても戻ってくる)	January 8, 2018
343	2	"Flavoring Is Best in Small Quantities"; Transliteration: "Choumiryou wa Hikaeme ni" (Japanese: 調味料は控え目に)	January 15, 2018
344	3	"A Delinquent's Kid Has Long Neck Hair"; Transliteration: "Yankī no Kodomo wa Eriashi ga Nagai" (Japanese: ヤンキーの子供は襟足が長い)	January 22, 2018
345	4	"The Line Between Tenacious and Annoying is Paper-Thin"; Transliteration: "Shibutoi to Shitsukoi wa Kamihitoe" (Japanese: しぶといとしつこいは紙一重)	January 29, 2018
346	5	"Geezers Carve the Things They Shouldn't Forget into Their Wrinkles"; Transliteration: "Jii-san wa Wasurete wa Ikenai Mono o Shiwa ni Kizamu" (Japanese: 爺さんは忘れてはいけないものを皺に刻む)	February 5, 2018
347	6	"Machines That Pick Up Useless Habits Are Called People"; Transliteration: "Muda o Oboeta Kikai o Ningen to Iu" (Japanese: 無駄を覚えた機械を人間という)	February 12, 2018
348	7	"Men Must Live Not Long or Thick, but Hard"; Transliteration: "Otoko wa Nagaku mo Futoku mo Naku Kataku Ikiro" (Japanese: 男は長くも太くもなく硬く生きろ)	February 19, 2018
349	8	"Ogres Are Weak Against Tiny Heroes Like the Inch-High Samurai"; Transliteration: "Oni wa Issun Boushi no Youna Kotsubu ni Yowai" (Japanese: 鬼は一寸法師のような小粒に弱い)	February 26, 2018
350	9	"Bragging About Your Own Heroic Deeds Will Make People Hate You, so Make Others Do It For You"; Transliteration: "Mukashi no Buyuuden wa Jibun de Hanasu to Kirawareru no de Tanin ni Hanasasero" (Japanese: 昔の武勇伝は自分で話すと嫌われるので他人に話させろ)	March 5, 2018
351	10	"Jump and Power Creep Go Hand-in-Hand"; Transliteration: "Jyanpu wa Infure te Nanbo" (Japanese: ジャンプはインフレてなんぼ)	March 12, 2018
352	11	"Peace and Destruction Are Two Sides of the Same Coin"; Transliteration: "Heiwa to Hametsu wa Hyōri Ittai" (Japanese: 平和と破滅は表裏一体)	March 19, 2018
353	12	"Bushido Is Found One Second Before Death"; Transliteration: "Bushidō to wa Ichi Byō go ni Shinu Koto to Mitsuke Tari" (Japanese: 武士道とは一秒後に死ぬ事と見つけたり)	March 26, 2018
354	13	"The Evildoers Who Do Good"; Transliteration: "Akuji o Hataraki nagara Zenji o Hataraku Ikimono" (Japanese: 悪事をはたらきながら善事をはたらくいきもの)	July 9, 2018
355	14	"Rabbits Leap Higher on Moonlit Nights"; Transliteration: "Usagi wa Tsukiyo ni Takaku Tobu" (Japanese: 兎は月夜に高く跳ぶ)	July 16, 2018
356	15	"Making a Dull World Interesting"; Transliteration: "Omoshiroki Koto mo Naki Yo o Omoshiroku" (Japanese: おもしろきこともなき世をおもしろく)	July 23, 2018
357	16	"Do Something Uncharacteristic, and Something Uncharacteristic Will Happen"; Transliteration: "Gara Janai Koto o Suruto Gara Janai Koto ga Okoru" (Japanese: ガラじゃない事をするとガラじゃない事が起こる)	July 30, 2018
358	17	"Countless Kings"; Transliteration: "Amata no ō" (Japanese: 数多の王)	August 6, 2018
359	18	"The Unemployed Cannot Be Stained By Anything"; Transliteration: "Mushoku wa Nanimono ni mo Somaranai" (Japanese: 無職は何者にも染まらない)	August 13, 2018
360	19	"Always Hold On to Your Trump Cards"; Transliteration: "Kirifuda wa Totte Oke" (Japanese: 切り札はとっておけ)	August 20, 2018
361	20	"The Creatures Known as Humanity"; Transliteration: "Ningen to Iu Ikimono" (Japanese: 人間という生物)	August 27, 2018
362	21	"Sign"; Transliteration: "Kanban" (Japanese: 看板)	September 3, 2018
363	22	"Specter"; Transliteration: "Bōrei" (Japanese: 亡霊)	September 10, 2018
364	23	"Two in Girl Years Is Equal to Ten in Man Years"; Transliteration: "Shoujo no Ninen wa Otoko no Juunen" (Japanese: 少女の2年は男の10年)	September 17, 2018
365	24	"Salvation"; Transliteration: "Sukui" (Japanese: 救い)	September 24, 2018
366	25	"Dun Dun"; Transliteration: "Ku wa~tsu" (Japanese: くわっ)	October 1, 2018
367	26	"There Are Lines Even Villains Can't Cross"; Transliteration: "Akuyaku ni moyatte ī koto to warui koto ga aru" (Japanese: 悪役にもやっていい事と悪いことがある)	October 8, 2018
367	26	"Gintama Final Ending Scamming Trial"; Transliteration: "Gintama owaru owaru sagi saiban" (Japanese: 銀魂終わる終わる詐欺裁判)	October 8, 2018

== Gintama°: Love Potion Arc (OVA) ==
No.	Title	Original air date
1	"Smoke Rises in Places Without Love"; Transliteration: "Koinonai Tokoro ni Kemuri wa Tatanai" (Japanese: 恋のない所に煙は立たない)	August 4, 2016
Yoshiwara is besieged by an incense where whoever smells it, falls for the first person they see. First it was Tsukuyo and in trying to destroy it, things go downhill when it affects everyone.
2	"Eternal Flower"; Transliteration: "Eien no Hana" (Japanese: 永遠の花)	November 4, 2016

== Gintama: The Semi-Final (Special) ==
No.	Title	Original air date
1	"Don't Spread the Wrapping Cloth Without Thinking Ahead"; Transliteration: "Atosaki Kangaezu ni Furoshiki o Hirogeru Mono Janai" (Japanese: 後先考えずに風呂敷を広げるものじゃない)	January 15, 2021
2	"Don't Make Important Decisions at the Last Minute"; Transliteration: "Chokuzen ni Natte Daijina Koto o Kimeru Mono Janai" (Japanese: 直前になって大事なことを決めるものじゃない)	January 20, 2021

== Jump Festa Specials ==
#	Title	Airdate
1	"Gintama" (Japanese: 銀魂)	September 24, 2005
This episode is a set of short comedy stories involving Gintoki and his equally-broke sidekicks Shinpachi and Kagura. One day, Gintoki and his comrades are out viewing the spring flowers when suddenly the Shinsengumi appear, arguing that Gintoki has taken their flower-viewing spot. Gintoki's team and the Shinsengumi must then battle for the right to sit in that spot by using a violent version of rock paper scissors. The opening theme is "Planet X" by Audio Highs and the ending theme is "Omae no Kaa-chan XX da! (お前の母ちゃんXXだ; lit. "Your Mother is a XX")" by kazmy with Necromancers.
2	"White Demon's Birth"; Transliteration: "Shiroyasha Kotan" (Japanese: 白夜叉降誕)	September 21, 2008
This episode shows various scenes from the war between samurais and the Amanto, focusing on Gintoki's fights alongside Kotaro Katsura, Shinsuke Takasugi and Tatsuma Sakamoto. In the end, the episode is revealed to be a trailer from a film, which was in fact fake. The recurring characters from the series start fighting in order to become the heroes from Jump Anime Tour but they are interrupted by the director (in Elizabeth's costume) who tells he wants to watch the One Piece special to be featured next. The ending theme is "We Are!" (ウィーアー!) by Hiroshi Kitadani (One Piece's first opening theme), but it then changes to "Dondake!! Konishi Man" (どんだけー!小西マン) by Audio Highs.
3	"The Input of This Super Move Is Too Hard And I Can't Pull It Off"; Transliteration: "Chō hissatsu Komando wa Kata sugite Dasenai" (Japanese: 超必殺コマンドは難すぎて出せない)	November 9, 2014
This was an unaired episode of Gintama' featuring Lake Toya Hermit as he persuades Gintoki to learn secret techniques because he thought the anime is going to end soon. Lake Toya Hermit's parents then showed up. It is revealed that Katsura Kotaro and Hasegawa Taizo are the mother's apprentice, while Shimura Tae is the father's. The ending song is Kaela Kimura's famous DoCoMo commercial song "Ring a Ding Dong" which, in the episode, is Katsura, Hasegawa, and Otae's secret techniques.
4	"Delicious Goods Are Preempted After Being Postponed, So Be Sure To Eat Them First"; Transliteration: "Umai-mono wa Atomawashi ni Suru to Yokodorisareru kara Yappari Saki ni Kue" (Japanese: 美味いモノは後回しにすると横取りされるからやっぱり先に食え)	November 3, 2015

== Movies ==
#	Title	Movie Premiere
1	"Gintama: The Movie: Benizakura Chapter"; Transliteration: "Gintama: Shinyaku Benizakura-Hen" (Japanese: 銀魂 新訳紅桜篇)	April 24, 2010
The silver-haired samurai Sakata Gintoki investigates the disappearance of a legendary sword named Benizakura while his partners Kagura and Shimura Shinpachi try to find out what has happened to Gintoki's friend, Kotaro Katsura.
2	"Gintama: The Movie: The Final Chapter: Be Forever Yorozuya"; Transliteration: "Gekijōban Gintama Kanketsu-hen: Yorozuya yo Eien Nare" (Japanese: 劇場版 銀魂 完結篇 万事屋よ永遠なれ)	July 6, 2013
Edo is thrown to chaos by a mysterious cause. Sakata Gintoki now lives in a world where the future has changed. Gintoki, who is now a ghost of the past, must once again carry the burden in order to save his friends. He must finish the biggest job ever, which may be the final job of Yorozuya.
3	"Gintama: The Very Final"; Transliteration: "Gintama: The Final" (Japanese: 銀魂 THE FINAL)	January 8, 2021
