= Gintama. Shirogane no Tamashii-hen =

- No. of episodes: 26

Release
- Original network: TV Tokyo
- Original release: January 7 – October 7, 2018

Season chronology
- ← Previous; Gintama. Porori-hen Next → Gintama: The Semi-Final

The episodes from the anime television series Gintama. Shirogane no Tamashii-hen (銀魂．銀ノ魂篇) are based on the Gintama manga by Hideaki Sorachi. The series premiered on January 8, 2018. It is a sequel to the Gintama. Porori-hen anime series which aired and ended in 2017.

The first opening theme is "Katte ni my Soul" by DISH// and the ending theme is "Hana Ichi Monme" by Burnout Syndromes. The second opening theme is "I Wanna Be..." by Spyair and the ending theme is "Hikari Shoumeiron" by CHiCO with HoneyWorks.

== Episode list ==
No. overall	No. in season	Title	Original release date (Note: TV Tokyo listed its air dates on Sunday at 25:35, which is effectively Monday at 1:35 JST.)
342	1	"Try As You Might to Make a Natural Perm Go Away, It Will Always Return"; Transliteration: "Tennen Pāma wa Gunyagunya Magatte mo Modotte Kuru" (Japanese: 天然パーマはグニャグニャ曲がっても戻ってくる)	January 8, 2018
Silver Soul Arc Part One: Utsuro's master plan is in full effect as Earth is taken over by the Altana Liberation Army. With Odd Jobs still not back from Rakuyo, the residents of Kabuki District have a hard time adjusting to life as a colony.
343	2	"Flavoring Is Best in Small Quantities"; Transliteration: "Choumiryou wa Hikaeme ni" (Japanese: 調味料は控え目に)	January 15, 2018
Silver Soul Arc Part Two: Katsura, Sakamoto, and Nobunobu arrive at the S.S. Heavenly Bird and try to bring the Liberation Army to the negotiating table. Meanwhile, the various factions in Edo begin to make their move.
344	3	"A Delinquent's Kid Has Long Neck Hair"; Transliteration: "Yankī no Kodomo wa Eriashi ga Nagai" (Japanese: ヤンキーの子供は襟足が長い)	January 22, 2018
Silver Soul Arc Part Three: With the Odd Jobs looking for the Tendoshu, things heat up on the Liberation Army's main ship. Shijaku has promised his cooperation to Nobunobu, but now he must convince his comrades.
345	4	"The Line Between Tenacious and Annoying is Paper-Thin"; Transliteration: "Shibutoi to Shitsukoi wa Kamihitoe" (Japanese: しぶといとしつこいは紙一重)	January 29, 2018
Silver Soul Arc Part Four: The encounter with Utsuro leaves Gintoki feeling more helpless than ever before. That's when he receives a very powerful reminder.
346	5	"Geezers Carve the Things They Shouldn't Forget into Their Wrinkles"; Transliteration: "Jii-san wa Wasurete wa Ikenai Mono o Shiwa ni Kizamu" (Japanese: 爺さんは忘れてはいけないものを皺に刻む)	February 5, 2018
Silver Soul Arc Part Five: The return of some familiar faces breathes new life into Earth's resistance, but they're as troublesome as they've always been! And when the Liberation Army brings out its big guns, it's up to Gengai to respond.
347	6	"Machines That Pick Up Useless Habits Are Called People"; Transliteration: "Muda o Oboeta Kikai o Ningen to Iu" (Japanese: 無駄を覚えた機械を人間という)	February 12, 2018
Silver Soul Arc Part Six: The machines have done their part and left Earth's future in the hands of humanity. But Gengai's cannon has also painted a huge target on the Kabuki District, and the Liberation Army immediately marches toward it.
348	7	"Men Must Live Not Long or Thick, but Hard"; Transliteration: "Otoko wa Nagaku mo Futoku mo Naku Kataku Ikiro" (Japanese: 男は長くも太くもなく硬く生きろ)	February 19, 2018
Silver Soul Arc Part Seven: Prince Hata's past is revealed along with the history of Planet Okoku. Can Katsura and Hasegawa really get them on Earth's side?
349	8	"Ogres Are Weak Against Tiny Heroes Like the Inch-High Samurai"; Transliteration: "Oni wa Issun Boushi no Youna Kotsubu ni Yowai" (Japanese: 鬼は一寸法師のような小粒に弱い)	February 26, 2018
Silver Soul Arc Part Eight: The Kabuki District is under siege, and the fearsome Dakini race arrive on the scene. How can the District and its residents cope with this onslaught?
350	9	"Bragging About Your Own Heroic Deeds Will Make People Hate You, so Make Others Do It For You"; Transliteration: "Mukashi no Buyuuden wa Jibun de Hanasu to Kirawareru no de Tanin ni Hanasasero" (Japanese: 昔の武勇伝は自分で話すと嫌われるので他人に話させろ)	March 5, 2018
Silver Soul Arc Part Nine: The Shinra finally make their move and look to capture the creator of the virus cannon with their underhand tactics. But right as things get desperate, the "boss" of the Kabuki District intervenes.
351	10	"Jump and Power Creep Go Hand-in-Hand"; Transliteration: "Jyanpu wa Infure te Nanbo" (Japanese: ジャンプはインフレてなんぼ)	March 12, 2018
Silver Soul Arc Part Ten: Under the leadership of the Kabuki District's Four Devas, the residents are beginning to drive out the enemies inside the town. However, they still have to deal with Ougai, the leader of the Dakini force.
352	11	"Peace and Destruction Are Two Sides of the Same Coin"; Transliteration: "Heiwa to Hametsu wa Hyōri Ittai" (Japanese: 平和と破滅は表裏一体)	March 19, 2018
Silver Soul Arc Part Eleven: The residents of Edo enjoy a night of rest after winning their first battle. Some of them bond before the upcoming battles. Meanwhile Gengai is kidnapped by the Yato.
353	12	"Bushido Is Found One Second Before Death"; Transliteration: "Bushidō to wa Ichi Byō go ni Shinu Koto to Mitsuke Tari" (Japanese: 武士道とは一秒後に死ぬ事と見つけたり)	March 26, 2018
Silver Soul Arc Part Twelve: Prince Ensho has sworn to destroy Earth. Unexpected factions come together to stop the destruction of Earth.
354	13	"The Evildoers Who Do Good"; Transliteration: "Akuji o Hataraki nagara Zenji o Hataraku Ikimono" (Japanese: 悪事をはたらきながら善事をはたらくいきもの)	July 9, 2018
Silver Soul Arc Part Thirteen: The history of Kiheitai is revealed. While the Yato on Earth try to undo Gengai's nanomachines, Kiheitai joins Katsura, Sakamoto and Nobunobu on the enemy ship, Heavenly Bird, in space.
355	14	"Rabbits Leap Higher on Moonlit Nights"; Transliteration: "Usagi wa Tsukiyo ni Takaku Tobu" (Japanese: 兎は月夜に高く跳ぶ)	July 16, 2018
Silver Soul Arc Part Fourteen: Harusame Division 7 led by Kamui lands on Earth to help take out the enemy Yato. Utsuro makes his appearance at the end of the fight with a revelation.
356	15	"Making a Dull World Interesting"; Transliteration: "Omoshiroki Koto mo Naki Yo o Omoshiroku" (Japanese: おもしろきこともなき世をおもしろく)	July 23, 2018
Silver Soul Arc Part Fifteen: This episode focuses on the Kiheitai's battle with the Altana Liberation Army. Kawakami Bansai, Matako and Henpeita believe in Shinsuke and entrust their goals to him.
357	16	"Do Something Uncharacteristic, and Something Uncharacteristic Will Happen"; Transliteration: "Gara Janai Koto o Suruto Gara Janai Koto ga Okoru" (Japanese: ガラじゃない事をするとガラじゃない事が起こる)	July 30, 2018
Silver Soul Arc Part Sixteen: The Kiheitai continues to fight, alongside Katsura's Joi rebels and Tatsuma's Kaientai. It's a brutal fight with many characters getting injured. Shinsuke has a realization, as does Prince Ensho.
358	17	"Countless Kings"; Transliteration: "Amata no ō" (Japanese: 数多の王)	August 6, 2018
Silver Soul Arc Part Seventeen: The battle between Earth and Altana Liberation Army comes to an end but not without sacrifices. Utsuro moves forward with his plan to monopolize Altana and destroy the planet, but Kamui, Umibozu along with the Yorozuya and Shinsengumi try to stop him. Meanwhile the shrine sisters subdue the Altana with the help of Sadaharu.
359	18	"The Unemployed Cannot Be Stained By Anything"; Transliteration: "Mushoku wa Nanimono ni mo Somaranai" (Japanese: 無職は何者にも染まらない)	August 13, 2018
Silver Soul Arc Part Eighteen: Ane and Mone, the shrine sisters, try to stop the Altana but get ambushed. Kamui and Umibozu have a little father-son bonding fighting off undead while Yorozuya run ahead to aid Ane, Mone and Sadaharu. Hasegawa brings out his potential by uniting the other branches of the Altana Liberation Army, who pledge to help him save the main ship, Heavenly Bird, and Earth.
360	19	"Always Hold On to Your Trump Cards"; Transliteration: "Kirifuda wa Totte Oke" (Japanese: 切り札はとっておけ)	August 20, 2018
Silver Soul Arc Part Nineteen: Sadaharu is the only one who can stop the Altana from going berserk. Humans, and Yato fight Utsuro together in a death fight losing many people. Utsuro begins to lose his regeneration because of everyone putting their lives on the line.
361	20	"The Creatures Known as Humanity"; Transliteration: "Ningen to Iu Ikimono" (Japanese: 人間という生物)	August 27, 2018
Silver Soul Arc Part Twenty: Yorozuya, Shinsengumi, and the Yato fight with their lives on the line to put an end to Utsuro. Meanwhile everyone in space is trying to control the rapidly sinking Heavenly Bird or else it will destroy Earth.
362	21	"Sign"; Transliteration: "Kanban" (Japanese: 看板)	September 3, 2018
Silver Soul Arc Part Twenty One: After Edo is left in ruins, everyone goes their own ways and there is a 2 year time skip.
363	22	"Specter"; Transliteration: "Bōrei" (Japanese: 亡霊)	September 10, 2018
Silver Soul Arc Part Twenty Two: The Yorozuya and Shinsengumi, who went their own paths, meet each other on their own individual journeys. Katsura is the Prime Minister of Edo and Sakamoto is broke.
364	23	"Two in Girl Years Is Equal to Ten in Man Years"; Transliteration: "Shoujo no Ninen wa Otoko no Juunen" (Japanese: 少女の2年は男の10年)	September 17, 2018
Silver Soul Arc Part Twenty Three: Okita, Shinpachi and Kagura meet in a not so chance encounter. Gintoki and Takasugi team up for a common goal.
365	24	"Salvation"; Transliteration: "Sukui" (Japanese: 救い)	September 24, 2018
Silver Soul Arc Part Twenty Four: Takasugi and Gintoki compare their past years and corroborate their information and decide what they must do next. They set out to save Utsuro and their teacher Shoyo.
366	25	"Dun Dun"; Transliteration: "Ku wa~tsu" (Japanese: くわっ)	October 1, 2018
Silver Soul Arc Part Twenty Five: Gintoki is back in Edo and he must avoid meeting his friends. He does anything to do so including wearing Kyubei's underwear on his head.
367	26	"There Are Lines Even Villains Can't Cross"; Transliteration: "Akuyaku ni moyatte ī koto to warui koto ga aru" (Japanese: 悪役にもやっていい事と悪いことがある)	October 8, 2018
367	26	"Gintama Final Ending Scamming Trial"; Transliteration: "Gintama owaru owaru sagi saiban" (Japanese: 銀魂終わる終わる詐欺裁判)	October 8, 2018
Silver Soul Arc Part Twenty Six: The first half continues the Silver Soul Arc as Gintoki in disguise is under capture in Yoshiwara Paradise and tortured by Tsukuyo as a flashback scene revealing the reason why she stays inside Yoshiwara instead of following Gintoki. After escaping Yoshiwara, Gintoki accidentally meets Shinpachi. Then, Gintoki suddenly calls "cut" and stops the anime as when Shinpachi was trying to save him, leading to the part B of this episode. The second half is a completely original segment with most of the recurring characters attending the "Fake ending trial", with Gintoki being the judge as he, along with ex-editor-in-chief Manabe and with a letter from Sorachi Hideaki explains the current state of Gintama manga and anime series, and the reason why it has to end.
