= Negoto =

Japanese musical group

- Origin: Chiba, Japan
- Genres: Electronic rock
- Years active: 2007–2019
- Labels: Ki/oon Music
- Members: Sachiko Aoyama; Mizuki Masuda; Yū Fujisaki; Sayako Sawamura

Negoto (Japanese: ねごと, Hepburn: negoto) was a Japanese electronic rock band from Chiba Prefecture. Negoto formed in 2007 when the members were high school students. In 2008, the band won a special jury prize at the 1st Senkō Riot (閃光ライオット, Senkō raiotto), a music festival featuring teen bands in Japan. The band debuted in 2010.

They are best known for the 2010 hit song "Loop" reached number 3 in Billboard Japan Hot 100, the 2011 hit song "Charon" reached number 6 in Billboard Japan Hot 100 and the 2012 hit song "sharp ♯" (from the anime series Mobile Suit Gundam AGE) reached number 11 in Billboard Japan Hot 100. The band's other anime theme contributions include Galilei Donna, Shimajirou to Kujira no Uta, and Gintama°.

== Last tour and disbandment ==
On December 28, 2018, Negoto published a message on their official website stating that they will disband on July 20, 2019. They will embark on their last tour on May 28 and end on July 20.

== Members ==
- Sachiko Aoyama (蒼山幸子) – vocals, keyboards
- Mizuki Masuda (沙田瑞紀) – guitar
- Yū Fujisaki (藤咲佑) – bass guitar
- Sayako Sawamura (澤村小夜子) – drums

== Discography ==
Studio albums

- ex Negoto (2011)
- 5 (2013)
- VISION (2015)
- ETERNALBEAT (2017)
- SOAK (2017)

EPs and mini-albums

- Hello! "Z" (2010)
- Mercirou e.p. (2011)
- "Z"OOM (2014)
- Asymmetry e.p. (2016)

Singles

- Charon (2011)
- Sharp (2012)
- Lightdentity / Re:myend! (2012)
- nameless (2012)
- greatwall (2012)
- Tashikanauta (2013)
- Syncromanica (2013)
- Ammonite! / Tasogare No Rhapsody (2014)
- DESTINY (2015)
- DANCER IN THE HANABIRA (2017)
- Sora mo Toberuhazu / ALL RIGHT (2017)
