= Gintama': Enchōsen =

- Cover of the first Gintama': Enchōsen DVD
- No. of episodes: 13

Release
- Original network: TV Tokyo
- Original release: October 4, 2012 – March 28, 2013

Season chronology
- ← Previous; Gintama' Next → Gintama°

The episodes of the anime television series Gintama': Enchōsen (銀魂' 延長戦) are adapted from Hideaki Sorachi's manga "Gintama." The series debuted on TV Tokyo on October 4, 2012, serving as a direct continuation of the second "Gintama'" anime that concluded in March 2012. The core creative team from the second TV series remains intact for "Gintama': Enchōsen", with Yoichi Fujita continuing as the director.

The show follows the unconventional samurai, Gintoki Sakata, his apprentice, Shinpachi Shimura, and the alien girl Kagura as they work as freelancers, taking on odd jobs to make ends meet—though often failing to pay their rent. The episodes were released across four DVDs from December 19, 2012, to May 22, 2013.

"Gintama': Enchōsen" features two opening themes and two ending themes. The initial opening theme, "LET'S GO OUT" by AMOYAMO, is used from episodes 1 to 4 and during the "Gintama Classic" rerun episodes. The second opening theme, "Sakura Honeymoon" (サクラミツツキ, Sakura Mitsutsuki) by SPYAIR, takes over from episode 5 onwards. The first ending theme, "Moonwalk" (ムーンウォーク, Mūnuōku) by MONOBRIGHT, is employed for episodes 1 to 4 and the "Gintama Classic" rerun episodes. The sixth ending theme, "Expect" (エクスペクト, Ekusupekuto) by PAGE, is used from episode 5 onwards.

== Episodes ==
No. overall	No. in season	Title	Original release date
253	1	"Nobody with Natural Straight Hair Can Be That Bad/Nobody with Straight Blond Hair Can Be That Good"; Transliteration: "Sutorēto Pāma ni Warui Yatsu wa Inai/Kinpatsu Sutopā ni Roku na Yatsu wa Inai" (Japanese: ストレートパーマに悪い奴はいない/金パツストパーにロクな奴はいない)	October 4, 2012
While Gintoki was gone, a new leader of the Yorozuya took place. He was built by Gengai Hiraga by orders of Kagura and Shinpachi who were mad at Gintoki for leaving them behind. In order for them to keep doing their work they came up with ideas to make the perfect yorozuya substitute leader that would fill in Gintoki's spot when he was absent.
254	2	"Kintoki and Gintoki"; Transliteration: "Kintoki to Gintoki" (Japanese: 金時と銀時)	October 11, 2012
With Kintoki Sakata still having the favor of everyone around due to his manipulation, It's up to Tama and Sadaharu (the only two who've not been affected due to being a machine and an animal respectively.) to help everyone regain the memories of Gintoki.
255	3	"Kin-san's Kintama"; Transliteration: "Kin-san no Kin○" (Japanese: 金さんの金○)	October 18, 2012
Kintoki has raided the city to search for Gin, but a few leaders question why he is obsessing over one man.
256	4	"The Meaning of a Main Character"; Transliteration: "Shujinkō to wa" (Japanese: 主人公とは)	October 25, 2012
The battle of Kin-chan vs. Gin-Chan reaches the climax. Kin-Chan will end this anime for good this time.
257	5	"Courtesan Turns the Tables"; Transliteration: "Keisei Gyakuten" (Japanese: 傾城逆転)	January 10, 2013
After being invited to spend the night with the legendary Courtesan, Gin must fight back the waves of nausea and help this woman see the next moon rise.
258	6	"Inside the Palace!!"; Transliteration: "Denchūdegozaru!!" (Japanese: 殿中でござる!!)	January 17, 2013
The current Shogun is unconscious and the former shogun is outside the door requesting an audience. Gin must play the role of Shigeshige or everyone will lose their head.
259	7	"Five Pinkies"; Transliteration: "Go-hon no yubi" (Japanese: 5本の指)	January 24, 2013
The Odd Jobs team and Tsu-Ki assault the palace with full force. Things are going well until the Oniwabanshu appears to protect the former shogun.
260	8	"Pinky Swear"; Transliteration: "Shinjūdate" (Japanese: 心中立て)	January 31, 2013
It seems every faction has turned against the former shogun Sadasada. With the help of a friend Gin is given a second chance to defeat Oboro, but will his body hold out? Can he keep his promise to Tsu-ki?
261	9	"Unsetting Moon"; Transliteration: "Shizumanu Tsuki" (Japanese: 沈まぬ月)	February 7, 2013
The current Shogun resigns to protect the people of Edo from Murasame. Sadasada is imprisoned and later killed. Everyone begins to recover from the battle and wonders what exactly they were fighting for.
262	10	"Sound Of Beam Can Pierce Heart Of Everyone"; Transliteration: "Bīmu toiu Hibiki wa Arayuru mono no Hāto o Inuku" (Japanese: ビームという響きはあらゆる者のハートを射抜く)	March 7, 2013
Otae has new determination to restore her family's dojo and luckily a former student has come back to town.
263	11	"Two Brothers"; Transliteration: "Futari no Aniki" (Japanese: 二人のアニキ)	March 14, 2013
Gintoki has taken it upon himself to be the bad guy, so nobody will have to be hurt.
264	12	"Liquor and Gasoline, Smiles and Tears"; Transliteration: "Sake to Gasorin to Egao to Namida" (Japanese: 酒とガソリンと笑顔と涙)	March 21, 2013
Gintoki's insistence on saving Hajime has caused him to get badly hurt. This match will be decided between Obi Hajime of the School of Beam Saber and Shimura Shinpachi of the School of Tendo Mushin.
265	13	"Dog Food Doesn't Have As Much Flavor As You'd Think"; Transliteration: "Doggu Fūdo wa Mitame Yori Aji ga Usui" (Japanese: ドッグフードは見た目より味がうすい)	March 28, 2013
The Sakata family always shares when times are tough, some members have to learn the hard way.
