= Gintama. Porori-hen =

- No. of episodes: 13

Release
- Original network: TV Tokyo
- Original release: October 2 – December 25, 2017

Season chronology
- ← Previous; Gintama. Next → Gintama. Shirogane no Tamashii-hen

The episodes from the anime television series Gintama. Porori-hen (銀魂．ポろリ編) are based on the Gintama manga by Hideaki Sorachi. The series premiered on October 2, 2017. It is a sequel to the Gintama. anime series which aired and ended in 2017.

The opening theme is "VS" by BLUE ENCOUNT and the ending theme is "Hankou Seimei" (反抗声明) by Ayumikurikamaki.

== Episodes ==
No. overall	No. in season	Title	Original release date (Note: TV Tokyo listed its air dates on Sunday at 25:35, which is effectively Monday at 1:35 JST.)
329	1	"The Stairs to Adulthood May Not Always Lead Up"; Transliteration: "Otona no Kaidan wa Nobori Kaidan to wa Kagiranai" (Japanese: 大人の階段は昇り階段とは限らない)	October 2, 2017
Kagura's Boyfriend Arc Part One: Kagura has a boyfriend!! What unspeakable things will happen to him who appears before the obsessively nosey, restlessly agitated Umibozu and Gintoki!?
330	2	"My Bald Dad, My Light-Haired Dad, and My Dad's Glasses"; Transliteration: "Hageta Otousan to Shiraga no Otousan to Otousan no Megane" (Japanese: ハゲたお父さんと白髪のお父さんとお父さんのメガネ)	October 9, 2017
Kagura's Boyfriend Arc Part Two: Umibozu and Gintoki's meeting with Kagura's boyfriend Dai doesn't go according to plan as he's revealed to be the prince of Planet Titan. Meanwhile, the new couple's relationship takes a drastic turn.
331	3	"A Bowl of Ramen"; Transliteration: "Ippai no Ramen" (Japanese: 一杯のラーメン)	October 16, 2017
Homeless Arc Part One: Ikumatsu, shopkeeper of the Hokuto Shinken, continues to wait for a certain customer to fulfill a promise she made with her husband. After her husband's passing and the customer's disappearance, Katsura and Gin-san look for him, learning of his unexpected identity!
332	4	"A Family"; Transliteration: "Hitotsu no Kazoku" (Japanese: 一つのかぞく)	October 23, 2017
Homeless Arc Part Two: The gang discover the truth behind the old man and look to reunite him with Ikumatsu and her ramen.
333	5	"Life, Death, and Shades"; Transliteration: "Sei to Shi no Gurasan" (Japanese: 生と死のグラサン)	October 30, 2017
333	5	"All the Answers Can Be Found in the Field"; Transliteration: "Subete no Kotae wa genba ni Aru" (Japanese: 全ての答えは現場にある)	October 30, 2017
Hasegawa has a life-or-death encounter with assassins. The Shinsengumi and Mimawarigumi compete over solving a fictional case.
334	6	"3000 Leagues in Search of a Scabbard"; Transliteration: "Saya o Tazunete Sanzenri" (Japanese: 鞘をたずねて三千里)	November 6, 2017
Excalibur Arc Part One: The Yorozuya visit Tetsuko's blacksmith shop to resharpen Otose's husband's sword for his death anniversary. While there, they stumble across a sword Amanto who asks for their help in finding his scabbard wife. Things become worse as Gintoki is stuck with this sword up his behind, the sword's wife is in the care of Okita Sougo and a serial killer wields the most powerful and dangerous Amanto sword... and all three end up colliding in this tale.
335	7	"The Super Sadist and the Super Sadist"; Transliteration: "Do-S to Do-S" (Japanese: ドSとドS)	November 13, 2017
Excalibur Arc Part Two: The Yorozuya and Tetsuko try to sharpen Kusanagi with little success while learning the reasons behind his weakened state and obsession. At the same time Senbee, or actually the demon sword Maganagi, meets his match with Okita.
336	8	"The Strongest Sword, and the Dullest Sword"; Transliteration: "Saikyou no Ken to Saitei no Namakura" (Japanese: 最強の剣と最低の鈍)	November 20, 2017
Excalibur Arc Part Three: With Okita now possessed by Maganagi, Gintoki and Kusanagi's chances of winning have dimmed. But with a surprise revelation about Saya and a last minute arrival, the duo may have a chance.
337	9	"Wash Your Hands Before a Handshake"; Transliteration: "Akushu no Mae wa Te o Arae" (Japanese: 握手の前は手を洗え)	November 27, 2017
HDZ48 Arc Part One: Kagura and Otsu start up a full-scale idol unit. In response, the galaxy's strongest idol group sends them a challenge. And at the dueling stage, Diamond Perfume participates as a backup band too!?
338	10	"Diamonds are Unscratchable"; Transliteration: "Daiyamondo wa Kizutsukanai" (Japanese: ダイヤモンドは傷つかない)	December 4, 2017
HDZ48 Arc Part Two: Galaxy Kingdom Bitches 48 steal Otsu-chan's fanbase. Gin, Shin and Kagura compete against GKB48 in a meet and greet contest.
339	11	"An Idol's Badge of Honor"; Transliteration: "Aidoru no kunshō" (Japanese: アイドルの勲章)	December 11, 2017
HDZ48 Arc Part Three: The meet and greet contest takes an unexpected turn. Tsu Terakado realizes the importance of her followers and friends.
340	12	"The Line Between Godlike Games and Shitty Games Is Paper-Thin"; Transliteration: "Kami Gee to Kuso Gee wa Kamihitoe" (Japanese: 神ゲーと糞ゲーは紙一重)	December 18, 2017
340	12	"Glasses Are a Part of the Soul"; Transliteration: "Megane wa Tamashii no Ichibu" (Japanese: メガネは魂の一部)	December 18, 2017
Gintama gets a new game, Gintama Rumble. Gintoki makes changes in the game with the help of Tama. Guardian Spirits Arc Part One: Shinpachi breaks his glasses and gets a new pair from a shady shop. His new glasses see more than normal glasses - everyone's Guardian Spirits.
341	13	"Guardian Spirits Are Also a Part of the Soul"; Transliteration: "Shugorei mo Tamashii no Ichibu" (Japanese: 守護霊も魂の一部)	December 25, 2017
Guardian Spirits Arc Part Two: Shinpachi observes everyone's Guardian Spirits helping them through races and is presented with a choice.
