= Gintama° =

- No. of episodes: 51

Release
- Original network: TV Tokyo
- Original release: April 8, 2015 – March 30, 2016

Season chronology
- ← Previous; Gintama': Enchōsen Next → Gintama.

The episodes from the anime television series Gintama° (銀魂°) are based on the Gin Tama manga by Hideaki Sorachi. The series premiered in TV Tokyo on April 8, 2015. It is a sequel to the Gintama anime series which has been on hiatus since 2013. The studio making the new season is BN Pictures, a new subsidiary of Bandai Namco Holdings. Chizuru Miyawaki is directing the new season with previous season's director Yoichi Fujita supervising. The series continues the story of eccentric samurai, Gintoki Sakata, his apprentice, Shinpachi Shimura, and a teenage alien girl named Kagura and their work as freelancers, who do odd jobs in order to pay the rent, which usually goes unpaid anyway.

Eight pieces of theme music are used: four opening themes and four ending themes. The first opening theme is "DAYxDAY" by BLUE ENCOUNT and the first ending theme is "DESTINY", performed by Negoto. The second opening theme is "Pride Kakumei" by CHiCO with HoneyWorks and the second ending theme is "Saigo Made Ii" by Aqua Timez. The third opening is "Beautiful Days" by OKAMOTO's and the third ending is "Glorious Days" by THREE LIGHTS DOWN KINGS. The fourth opening theme is "KNOW KNOW KNOW" by DOES and the fourth ending theme is "Acchi Muite" by Swimy.

== Episodes ==
No. overall	No. in season	Title	Original release date
266	1	"You can never Pause at the Perfect Time"; Transliteration: "Ichiji teishi wa Umai guai ni wa Tomaranai" (Japanese: 一時停止はうまい具合には止まらない)	April 8, 2015
Gintoki apologizes for the embarrassing upcoming of Gintama once again after quoting the end after the movie "Gintama: The Movie: The Final Chapter: Be Forever Yorozuya". Afterwards, Gintoki finds out that all the people of the town have been frozen still. Gin and his friends, Kagura and Shinpachi Shimura learn that the people stopped moving as a result of an alien device Gin broke. They seek help from Gengai Higara but he dies after a short amount of time. In order to save Gengai, the Yorozuya attempt to avoid Gengai's fate but this time it is Hasegawa who dies. The Yorozuya keep trying ways to save Gengai and Hasegawa until they accidentally cause Piccolo from Dragon Ball killing Gengai and Hasegawa.
267	2	"Even a Matsui Stick Can't Handle Some Kinds of Dirt"; Transliteration: "Matsui Bou demo Torenai Gomi ga Aru" (Japanese: マツイ棒でもとれないゴミがある)	April 15, 2015
Gintoki and Company finds themselves interfering with time resulting in death of one person if they try to revive the frozen time. It is found that the clock has run out of batteries. To get the batteries Gintoki and Company encounter the Shinsengumi and Katsura. The clock ultimately stops and a SFX character that came to life saves them by inserting the battery.
268	3	"An Inspector's Love begins with an Inspection"; Transliteration: "Kansatsu no Koi wa Kansatsu Kara Hajimaru" (Japanese: 監察の恋は観察から始まる)	April 22, 2015
Yamazaki is ordered to stake on the Yorozuya as Toushiro learns that Gintoki is the legendary White Yaksha of the Joi faction. During stakeout he falls in love with Tama due to an accident at the mall. He stalks Tama and places a curse over paper by writing Tama and grouping himself as one of Kondo's stalker type. To solve this problem the Shinsengumi and the Yorozuya hold a marriage ceremony.
269	4	"Forget Dates, Remember People"; Transliteration: "Nengou Anki yori Ningen Yakitsukero" (Japanese: 年号暗記より人間焼きつけろ)	April 29, 2015
269	4	"You Can Hide Your Porn Mags But You Can't Hide Your ***" Transliteration: "Ero Hon Kakushite OOO Kakusazu" (Japanese: エロ本隠して○○○隠さず)	April 29, 2015
Displeased with Tsukuyo's way of tutoring, Seita asks Gintoki to help him out with his studies instead. Gintoki is then forced to teach Seita history, but it goes off course; Gintoki's excuse being that Seita must first be interested in history to learn it properly. Due to his strict parents, Shinpachi is asked by Takachin to hold on to his ecchi manga until it is safe. Now it becomes Shinpachi's problem to hide them from his sister. The young man asks the porn-mag-hiding veteran Sakata Gintoki for assistance.
270	5	"A Mirror Provides a Frozen Reflection of Both Your Beautiful and Ugly Sides"; Transliteration: "Kagami wa Bi mo Shū mo Ari no Mama o Utsushidasu" (Japanese: 鏡は美も醜もありのままを映し出す)	May 6, 2015
270	5	"Nobody Likes the Photo on Their License"; Transliteration: "Menkyoshō no Shashin o Ki ni Itteru Yatsu wa Kaimu" (Japanese: 免許証の写真を気に入ってる奴は皆無)	May 6, 2015
Sa-chan secretly hides away behind a newly installed one-way mirror in the Odd Jobs' washroom/kitchen in an effort to see everything there is to see about Gintoki, but she soon slowly begins to regret it as she peeks at Gintoki and Company's secrets. Tired of the other Shinsengumi members talking badly about his duties as an inspector, Yamazaki decides to try obtaining a ninja license to become an official ninja to impress his comrades, after seeing Zenzou with one.
271	6	"Arriving Late to a Reunion Makes it Hard to Enter"; Transliteration: "Dousoukai wa Okurete Kuru to Hairizurai" (Japanese: 同窓会は遅れてくると入りづらい)	May 13, 2015
Gintoki meets Katsura and Sakamoto at a Joi reunion party, where they attempt to start a past arc in hope of remembering about their former comrade, Kurokono Tasuke. Their attempts to remember always end up going off course, but Takasugi's henchman, Henpeita, drops by and leaves them with a clue about Kurokono.
272	7	"A Reunion Also Brings to the Surface Things You Don't Want to Remember"; Transliteration: "Dousoukai wa Omoidashitakunai Omoide mo Yomigaette Kuru" (Japanese: 同窓会は思い出したくもない思い出も蘇ってくる)	May 20, 2015
Gintoki, Katsura and Sakamoto finally remember about the day that they supposedly had Kurokono Tasuke accidentally killed in an attempt to protect their allies in the war. Unbeknownst to them, Takasugi's underlings set them up in order to wipe out their master's biggest rivals, by tricking them into thinking Kurokono's ghost is coming back to kill them. However, their plan is foiled as the real Kurokono appears to help them.
273	8	"When Compared to Time in the Heavens, Fifty Years of Human Life Resembles Naught but Dreams and Lottery Tickets"; Transliteration: "Ningen Gojuu Nen Geten no Uchi o Kurabureba Yume Takarakuji no Gotoku Nari" (Japanese: 人間五十年下天のうちをくらぶれば夢宝くじの如くなり)	May 27, 2015
Hijikata receives a lottery ticket, which happens to belong to Gintoki, and finds out that it is worth 300 million yen. However, he starts to see illusions of mohawk gangs attempting to kill him. On his way to exchange the ticket at the bank, he first runs into Gintoki and then into a real mohawk gang and trouble ensues.
274	9	"Guys With Big Nostrils Also Have Big Imaginations"; Transliteration: "Hana no Ana no Dekai Yatsu wa Hasso-Ryoku mo Dekai" (Japanese: 鼻の穴のデカイ奴は発想力もデカイ)	June 3, 2015
274	9	"You Never Accept a New Sentai Series at the Start, But By the Final Episode, You Don't Want It to End"; Transliteration: "Atarashiku Hajimaru Sentai Mono wa Saisho wa Konna no Mitome ne Mitai ni Natte Iruga Saishukai no Koro ni wa Hanaretakunaku Natte Iru" (Japanese: 新しく始まる戦隊モノは最初はこんなの認めねェみたいになっているが最終回の頃には離れたくなくなっている)	June 3, 2015
Gintoki, Kagura and Shinpachi attempt to make an advertisement for the Yorozuya. The new generations of the Four Devas, now under leadership by Otae, discuss ways to improve Kabuki-cho's image.
275	10	"9 + 1 = Yagyu Jyubei"; Transliteration: "9 + 1 = Yagyū Juubee" (Japanese: ９＋１＝柳生十兵衛)	June 10, 2015
Kyubei gets her wish to be a man granted by a fortune teller as a purple meteor blows up in the Kabuki District, causing everyone in that area to have their gender reversed, except Otae and Shinpachi. How will the Yorozuya and Jyubei solve this dilemma?
276	11	"Calories Come Back to Bite You Just When You've Forgotten About Them"; Transliteration: "Karori wa Wasureta Koro ni Yattekuru" (Japanese: カロリーは忘れた頃にやってくる)	June 17, 2015
As the situation continues, the Shinsengumi and company decide to follow the cult's law in order to survive their wrath. However, things change when encountering Sa-chan and Tsukuyo, who both also have their gender reversed, sabotaging the cult's cameras and capturing several of their members.
277	12	"10 - 1 =" (Japanese: 10 - 1 =)	June 24, 2015
Disgusted by the gender change, the cult's leader manages to escape and finds another planet to wreak havoc. However, the Shinsengumi and company manage to keep being one step ahead at their next location, purposely to get into the firing range of the cult's weapon and changes everyone back to normal, killing all the cult's members and destroy their weapon before any planet falls victim to their curse. As the Yorozuya stabilize, they decide to watch a movie to relieve their been-through of the situation.
278	13	"All Mothers Pack Too Much Food Into a Lunch Box and Ruin the Shape"; Transliteration: "Kachan no Bento wa Itsumo Tsume Sugite Jakkan Tsuburete Iru" (Japanese: 母ちゃんの弁当はいつもつめすぎて若干つぶれている)	July 1, 2015
Seita starts his new education life in a temple school. A few days later his mother realizes she has packed too much food for his lunch, causing him to bloat and stuff up. Because of this, Tsukuyo decides to ask other women how to make a mid-size lunch for Seita to enjoy during his temple school days.
279	14	"The Reaper by Day and the Reaper by Night"; Transliteration: "Asa to Yoru no Shinigami" (Japanese: 朝と夜の死神)	July 8, 2015
A Phantom Killer is loose in the city and Gintoki soon finds himself involved in something very related to it.
280	15	"Human or Demon?"; Transliteration: "Oni ka Hito ka" (Japanese: 鬼か人か)	July 15, 2015
Ikeda Yaemon's true intentions start to reveal as Gintoki and his gang once again get hooked up in it.
281	16	"Farewell, Reaper"; Transliteration: "Saraba Shinigami" (Japanese: さらば死神)	July 22, 2015
Gintoki and Asaemon join hands to stop Yaemon's scheme of killing both of them off.
282	17	"A Phoenix Rises from the Ashes Over and Over"; Transliteration: "Fenikkusu wa Nando mo Yomigaeru" (Japanese: フェニックスは何度も蘇る)	July 29, 2015
Hasegawa comes up with a new way of making money by telling scary stories to children about his own misfortunes. But as soon as he runs out of ideas he turns to the Yorozuya for advice.
283	18	"Amen"; Transliteration: "Āmen" (Japanese: アーメン)	August 5, 2015
As Gintoki watches customers consulting Tama at Otose's Snack Bar, he comes up with an idea of trying to make money, by having Tama receive confessions from people in a confessional booth. Unfortunately, Gintoki and the Shogun become involved in an unbelievable mess.
284	19	"Being a Leader Is Tough"; Transliteration: "Rīdā wa Tsurai yo" (Japanese: リーダーは辛いよ)	August 12, 2015
A continuation of episode 283, Zura and the Shogun have become unexpectedly close and Gintoki tries to do what he can with what he's been left with.
285	20	"Love Is a Roach Motel"; Transliteration: "Koi wa Gokiburi Poipoi" (Japanese: 恋はゴキブリポイポイ)	August 19, 2015
A jealous Kondo rampages around a summer festival, breaking up couples due to his own lack of a date with Otae. But a chance meeting with Otae while in disguise makes him realize he may end up having a chance to finally be with her! If only the Yorozuya didn't interfere!
286	21	"A Sizzle Summer"; Transliteration: "Begirama na Natsu" (Japanese: ベギラマな夏)	August 26, 2015
286	21	"A Nothing Summer, 2015"; Transliteration: "Nanimo Nee yo Natsu 2015" (Japanese: 何もねぇよ夏2015)	August 26, 2015
The Yorozuya help Soyo-hime celebrate summer through the traditional watermelon smashing. Things get out of control when the princess gets kidnapped by rebels and it's up to the Yorozuya to save the day... with watermelons. Seita asks the Yorozuya for help finishing his homework but is having a tough time with one of them, a picture diary. Lupita, and panties, and fireworks, oh my! And let's not forget a shaggy monster!
287	22	"I'm the Mayo Guy, and He's the Sweet Tooth"; Transliteration: "Ore ga Mayoraa de, Aitsu ga Amatou de" (Japanese: おれがマヨラーで あいつが甘党で)	September 2, 2015
Gintoki and Hijikata are hit by a truck which results in them both switching bodies.
288	23	"I'm a Failure as a Leader and He's Also a Failure as a Leader"; Transliteration: "Ore ga Leader Shikkaku de, Aitsu mo Leader Shikkaku de" (Japanese: おれがリーダー失格で あいつもリーダー失格で)	September 9, 2015
A chance to return to normal is derailed when it is revealed that Gintoki's soul half has possessed a dead cat. With their transformed organizations unable to help, the two decide to find the monster cat on their own. It's unfortunate that it is in the possession of Shimura Tae.
289	24	"I'm Yorozuya and He's Shinsengumi"; Transliteration: "Ore ga Yorozuya de, Aitsu ga Shinsengumi de" (Japanese: おれが万事屋で あいつが真選組で)	September 16, 2015
Gintoki and Hijikata must work with their soul-switched comrades to release Gintoki's half-soul from Dozaemon. The conclusion of the Soul Switch Arc.
290	25	"Always Leave Enough Room for Fifty Million in Your Bag"; Transliteration: "Baggu wa Tsune ni Gosenman Hairu Youni Aketeoke" (Japanese: バッグは常に５千万入るようにあけておけ)	September 23, 2015
After a failed business venture, Sakamoto is abandoned by Mutsu but is captured by pirates, the same pirates who worked under Mutsu 10 years before and Sakamoto was also captured by. It's up to her and Gintoki to save the laughing fool. We also learn how they met.
291	26	"Always Leave Enough Room for Pebbles in Your Bag"; Transliteration: "Baggu wa Tsune ni Ishicoro ga Hairu Youni Aketeoke" (Japanese: バッグは常に石ころが入るようにあけておけ)	September 30, 2015
While trying to save Sakamoto, Mutsu and Gintoki infiltrate the remnant Chidori vessel. There revelations are made about the Kaientai and Mutsu. The conclusion of the Kaientai Arc.
292	27	"Style Goes Out of Fashion the Moment It's Put Into Words"; Transliteration: "Oshare to wa Oshare to Kotoba ni Shita Jiten de Kakikieru Mononari" (Japanese: オシャレとはオシャレと言葉にした時点でかき消えるものなり)	October 7, 2015
292	27	"There Are Two Types of People In This World: Those Who Yell Out Their Attack Names, and Those Who Don't"; Transliteration: "Yononaka ni wa Nishurui no Ningen ga iru sore wa Hissatsuwaza o Sakebu Ningen to Sakebanai Ningen da" (Japanese: 世の中には二種類の人間がいる それは必殺技を叫ぶ人間と叫ばない人間だ)	October 7, 2015
During a shopping trip, Tae suggests to Shinpachi to change his look. The two noticeably decide to help the two people who really need it more than Shinpachi does, Gintoki and Kagura. Shinpachi struggles to teach his new students (really a bunch of disinterested hobos). That is until Kondou finds a scroll written by his late father that may give him the chance to turn things around! But this is Gintama, it's never that simple.
293	28	"The Two Apes"; Transliteration: "Futari no Etekō" (Japanese: 二人の猿公)	October 14, 2015
Kondo encounters his tragic past as a rascal, knowing his former temple school returns to its former glory.
294	29	"Afros of Life and Death"; Transliteration: "Sei to Shi no Afuro" (Japanese: 生と死のアフロ)	October 21, 2015
Katsura infiltrates the Shinsengumi as a prolific Afro-wearing swordsman. He greatly impresses the Shinsengumi trio as well as the Third Captain, Saitou Shimaru. As Katsura tries to figure out his 'superior', Saitou sends a job request to the Yorozuya. And things begin to snowball from there.
295	30	"Afuro and Wolfro"; Transliteration: "Afurō to Afurō" (Japanese: 阿腐郎とアフ狼)	October 28, 2015
Saitou, thanks to a disguised Katsura, has been slated for execution by the Shinsengumi while Katsura rose in the ranks to become a popular replacement. It's up to the Yorozuya to clear his name as well as exposing the Joi patriot!
296	31	"Take the Initial Premise Lightly, and It'll Cost You"; Transliteration: "Shoki Settei wa Nametara Inochitori" (Japanese: 初期設定はナメたら命取り)	November 4, 2015
The temperature is at an all time high and Kagura's Yato DNA kicks in while the Yorozuya are on another job. Due to the heatwave, Gin and Shinpachi join Kagura under her parasol and eventually kick her out, leaving her lying in the dust. However when they go to check on her, she is not responsive. Gin and Shinpachi then take her to the Oedo Hospital for treatment, but due to lack of information on the Yato, the doctors are unable to do much. In order to get Gin and Shinpachi to regret what they did, Kagura goes through the trouble to fake a worse illness than she actually has.
297	32	"Keep Your Farewells Short"; Transliteration: "Wakare no Aisatsu wa Kanketsu ni" (Japanese: 別れの挨拶は簡潔に)	November 11, 2015
Recapping from the previous episode, Kagura remains in the hospital feigning an illness. Trouble starts brewing when Sougo, Kondo and Hijikata arrive at the scene escorting Soyo.
298	33	"One Editor Is Enough"; Transliteration: "Tantō Henshū wa Hitori de Tariru" (Japanese: 担当編集は一人で足りる)	November 18, 2015
298	33	"The G-Pen Is Capricious, and the Maru Pen Is Stubborn"; Transliteration: "Jīpen wa Kimagure-ya-san Tamapen wa Ganko-sha" (Japanese: Gペンは気まぐれ屋さん丸ペンは頑固者)	November 18, 2015
Shachi's manga drawings have been found out by the prison nurse. To his surprise, she likes it and Shachi develops a crush for her. He asks his fellow artist, Gintoki, for help wooing her and Gintoki suggests to use his manga to ask her out. Shachi gets his big break when Jump gives him a manga slot to start his manga. But he has a very limited time to complete it before the editor takes it the next morning. Gintoki gathers a group of prisoners to help put the chapter together. But are they enough to finish it by morning?
299	34	"Strike When the Sword and Overlord are Hot"; Transliteration: "Tetsu to Maō wa Atsui Uchi ni Ute" (Japanese: 鉄と魔王は熱いうちに打て)	November 25, 2015
299	34	"Oil Rain"; Transliteration: "Oiru no Ame" (Japanese: オイルの雨)	November 25, 2015
Tetsuko leaves the Yorozuya to tend to her shop as she searches for a rare metal. Two groups arrive separately to ask the trio to fix their ultimate swords to fight each other. The Yorozuya, as usual, make everything worse. Tama befriends an old cigarette vending machine on its last legs. She desperately tries to keep the old machine company even as its old owner abandons it and it itself is falling apart.
300	35	"Shogun of Light and Shadow"; Transliteration: "Hikari to kage no Shōgun" (Japanese: 光と影の将軍)	December 2, 2015
Shogun Assassination Arc Part One: The Shogun receives a lot of allies to help him bringing a better future.
301	36	"Ninja Village"; Transliteration: "Shinobi no Kuni" (Japanese: 忍の里)	December 9, 2015
Shogun Assassination Arc Part Two: Okita encounters Kagura's older brother, Kamui, in a death fight.
302	37	"Ninja Soul"; Transliteration: "Shinobi no Tamashī" (Japanese: 忍の魂)	December 16, 2015
Shogun Assassination Arc Part Three: Gintoki and company arrive at the land of Iga, the ninja village. Gintoki and the Shogun have a discussion as to whether the Shogun should keep being a coward for not having any responsibilities to treat his comrades to which they deserve.
303	38	"And Then There Were Five"; Transliteration: "Saigo no go-nin" (Japanese: 最後の5人)	December 23, 2015
Shogun Assassination Arc Part Four: As the Odd Jobs and company continue to protect the shogun, they discover Takasugi and Kamui joining forces due to Abuto's appearance.
304	39	"Those Who Protect Against All Odds"; Transliteration: "Yorozu o Mamoru-mono-tachi" (Japanese: 万事を護る者達)	January 6, 2016
Shogun Assassination Arc Part Five: Gintoki and Kagura finally get their chance to fight Takasugi and Kamui as Sa-chan and Zenzou are critically wounded.
305	40	"Sworn Enemy"; Transliteration: "Kataki" (Japanese: 仇)	January 13, 2016
Shogun Assassination Arc Part Six: As the bloodbath battle continues, Gintoki and Takasugi continue to encounter their past from their temple school on how to be a true samurai. As they remember what they endured, Takasugi gets struck in the back by a long blade weapon thrown by non other than Oboro of the Yata-Garasu as he appears in front of Gintoki.
306	41	"The Crows Caw After The Battle Ends"; Transliteration: "Ikusa no Ato ni wa Karasu ga Naku" (Japanese: 戦のあとには烏が哭く)	January 20, 2016
Shogun Assassination Arc Part Seven: As Oboro appears, he tells Takasugi that he and Kamui are nothing but pawns in Nobunobu's hands, making Oboro and the Yata-Garasu his new allies.
307	42	"Farewell, Buddy"; Transliteration: "Saraba Dachi kō" (Japanese: さらばダチ公)	January 27, 2016
Shogun Assassination Arc Part Eight: As the bloodbath comes to the end, Nobunobu becomes the new shogun of Edo as Shigeshige and Soyo seek refuge outside as they bid farewell to the Yorozuya, the Shinsengumi and the Oniwaban. While seeking refuge, Shigeshige gets poisoned by one of his guests and seeks medical attention, but as he gets closer to death, he feels relieved that he can now finally rest in peace.
308	43	"The Day the Demon Cried"; Transliteration: "Oni ga Naita Hi" (Japanese: 鬼が哭いた日)	February 3, 2016
Farewell Shinsengumi Arc Part One: After Shigeshige's death, Edo faces major changes as the Shinsengumi officially disband and the general commission elite takes over.
309	44	"Heroes Always Arrive Fashionably Late"; Transliteration: "Hīrō wa Okurete Yatte Kuru" (Japanese: ヒーローは遅れてやってくる)	February 10, 2016
Farewell Shinsengumi Arc Part Two: As Edo faces Nobunobu's wrath as the new shogun, Katsura decides to take down Nobunobu in order to restore Edo to its former glory.
310	45	"Lost and Found"; Transliteration: "Wasuremono" (Japanese: 忘れもの)	February 17, 2016
Farewell Shinsengumi Arc Part Three: Katsura, Kondo and Matsudaira must work together in order to escape from their execution.
311	46	"Prison Break"; Transliteration: "Datsugoku" (Japanese: 脱獄)	February 24, 2016
311	46	"Essay Manga Are Easy to Animate"; Transliteration: "Essei manga wa sakuga-raku" (Japanese: エッセイ漫画は作画楽)	February 24, 2016
Farewell Shinsengumi Arc Part Four: As the rebellion is on their way to rescue Katsura, Kondo and Matsudaira, the Yata-Garasu manage to counterattack, but the rebellion manages to escape in the life boats. Meanwhile, the escapees have a hard time with the general commission elite trying to prevent their getaway. Universal travel writer, Marsh Ian, travels to Earth to learn about the dominant species of the planet. In particular he studies one of the last remnants of one of the different types, a samurai... named Gintoki.
312	47	"Stray Dogs"; Transliteration: "Norainu" (Japanese: 野良犬)	March 2, 2016
Farewell Shinsengumi Arc Part Five: The rebellion encounters Oburo and Imai Nobume as Gintoki and Okita take them on. Meanwhile, Katsura is shot and critically wounded by Sasaki Isaburo's modern handgun as he and Kondo try to escape from the general commission elite's wrath and Matsudaira runs to the rebellion.
313	48	"Undelivered Mail"; Transliteration: "Todokanakatta mēru" (Japanese: 届かなかったメール)	March 9, 2016
Farewell Shinsengumi Arc Part Six: Gintoki discovers Sasaki Isaburo's intentions of using the rebellion to start a revolt in order to wipe all Samurai traditions and start a path anew by sending more Yata-Garasu troops as his trump card.
314	49	"Karma"; Transliteration: "Gou" (Japanese: 業)	March 16, 2016
Farewell Shinsengumi Arc Part Seven: As the chaos continues, Sasaki and his troops switch course by betraying and killing Yata-Garasu troops. Utsuro of the Yata-Garasu appears to slash the rebellion as Gintoki heads off against him. When Gintoki slashes off Utsuro's mask, he recognize the face of his dead teacher. The rebellion decides to retreat due to their wounds.
315	50	"Nobume"; Transliteration: "Nobume" (Japanese: 信女)	March 23, 2016
Farewell Shinsengumi Arc Part Eight: Due to Sasaki's betrayal against the Yata-Garasu, the general commission elite teams up with the rebellion to wipe the Yata-Garasu. As the escape ships collect their people, Sasaki meets his fate as he pushes Imai Nobume and his half-brother Tetsunosuke into the ship as Utsuro fires at their ship entrance, falling to his demise.
316	51	"Farewell Shinsengumi"; Transliteration: "Saraba Shinsengumi" (Japanese: さらば真選組)	March 30, 2016
Farewell Shinsengumi Arc Part Nine: The rebellion manages to escape from Yata-Garasu's wrath with the cost of Sasaki's life. With Nobunobu as the current Shogun and the Shinsengumi disbanded, Kondo and his group suffer a similar fate as Shigeshige by leaving Edo as they bid farewell to Gintoki, Kagura, Shinpachi, and Otae.
