= Gintama. =

- No. of episodes: 12

Release
- Original network: TV Tokyo
- Original release: January 9 – March 27, 2017

Season chronology
- ← Previous; Gintama° Next → Gintama. Porori-hen

The episodes from the anime television series Gintama. (銀魂．) are based on the Gin Tama manga by Hideaki Sorachi. The series premiered on TV Tokyo on January 9, 2017. It is a sequel to the Gintama° anime series which aired in 2015 and ended in 2016. The studio making the new season is BN Pictures, a new subsidiary of Bandai Namco Holdings. Chizuru Miyawaki is directing the new season with previous season's director Yoichi Fujita supervising. The series continues the story of eccentric samurai, Gintoki Sakata, his apprentice, Shinpachi Shimura, and a teenage alien girl named Kagura and their work as freelancers, who do odd jobs in order to pay the rent, which usually goes unpaid anyway. Crunchyroll later added the anime series for its streaming service.

Three pieces of theme music are used: one opening theme and two ending themes.The first opening theme is "Kagerou" by Real and the first ending theme is "Silver", performed by Rize. and the second ending theme is "We Gotta Fight" by XY.

== Episodes ==
No. overall	No. in season	Title	Original release date (Note: TV Tokyo listed its air dates on Sunday at 25:35, which is effectively Monday at 1:35 JST.)
317	1	"The Monster and the Monster's Child"; Transliteration: "Bakemono to Bakemono no Ko" (Japanese: 化物と化物の子)	January 9, 2017
Battle on Rakuyo Arc Part One: Katsura, his faction and the Yorozuya are in Akiba hiding from the bakufu before encountering Nobume, Matako and Takechi. Thus weaves a tale of the Kiheitai's fall, the Tendoushuu's birth and a surprising secret of Shouyou.
318	2	"Leave Letter"; Transliteration: "Kyūka-todoke" (Japanese: 休暇届)	January 16, 2017
Battle on Rakuyo Arc Part Two: As the Yorozuya struggle with the recent revelations, the Kiheitai find themselves with unexpected allies. Now all will go on a journey to the planet Rakuyou, once the birthplace of two certain redhead Yato.
319	3	"The Song of Samurai"; Transliteration: "Bushi no Uta" (Japanese: 武士の唄)	January 23, 2017
Battle on Rakuyo Arc Part Three: Enemies and allies have gathered on Rakuyou. So now the battles begin!
320	4	"Zura"; Transliteration: "Zura" (Japanese: ヅラ)	January 30, 2017
Battle on Rakuyo Arc Part Four: Katsura, Sakamoto, and Gintoki must face off against the most dangerous members of the Harusame, the 3 Mad Stars. First up, it is Katsura vs Shoukaku, along with the reveal of Katsura's past.
321	5	"The Two Fools"; Transliteration: "Utsukemono Futari" (Japanese: うつけもの二人)	February 6, 2017
Battle on Rakuyo Arc Part Five: One Star down, two to go; next up, it is Sakamoto vs Hankai. As he struggles to save ship and crew from the android's machinations, a certain character gains development.
322	6	"Ten Years"; Transliteration: "10-Nen" (Japanese: 10年)	February 13, 2017
Battle on Rakuyo Arc Part Six: Two down, one to go; last up, Gintoki vs. Batou with mistaken identities and illusions galore. And in the end, a certain character awakens and a certain quartet reunite.
323	7	"Paths"; Transliteration: "Hōhō" (Japanese: 方法)	February 20, 2017
Battle on Rakuyo Arc Part Seven: The Heavenly Kings are reunited to fight against the Harusame and Utsuro. Meanwhile, a certain father and son also reunite to kill the other; but not if Kagura has anything to say about it.
324	8	"Master of Kouan"; Transliteration: "Kōan no Nushi" (Japanese: 徨安のヌシ)	February 27, 2017
Battle on Rakuyo Arc Part Eight: Umibouzu vs. Utsuro and Kagura vs. Kamui. Though along the way, the father and son reveal the figure who has a connection to all four of them, the deceased wife and mother, Kouka.
325	9	"The Lost Rabbit"; Transliteration: "Mayoi Usagi" (Japanese: まよい兎)	March 6, 2017
Battle on Rakuyo Arc Part Nine: Through confusion and suffering, everything falls apart when Kouka grows ill and the ramifications of her constitution become apparent. In the present, Utsuro and Umibouzu's plus the siblings' fights end.
326	10	"Siblings"; Transliteration: "Kyoudai" (Japanese: 兄弟)	March 13, 2017
Battle on Rakuyo Arc Part Ten: It is the Yorozuya and Abuto vs Kamui to save him from the brink.
327	11	"First Student"; Transliteration: "Ichiban deshi" (Japanese: 一番弟子)	March 20, 2017
Battle on Rakuyo Arc Part Eleven: The arc comes to a close. Takasugi vs Oboro and Oboro's past is revealed.
328	12	"Hope"; Transliteration: "Kibou" (Japanese: 希望)	March 27, 2017
Battle on Rakuyo Arc Part Twelve: Utsuro's past is revealed as well as his ultimate plan, plus revelations are made. The Rakuyo Arc finale.
