= Gintama season 4 =

Gintama
- Season 4
- Cover from the first DVD of Gintama's fourth season
- No. of episodes: 51

Release
- Original network: TV Tokyo
- Original release: April 2, 2009 – March 25, 2010

Season chronology
- ← Previous; Season 3 Next → Gintama'

The episodes from the fourth season of the Japanese anime television series Gintama are directed by Yoichi Fujita and animated by Sunrise. It premiered on TV Tokyo on April 2, 2009, and ended on March 25, 2010. The anime is based on Hideaki Sorachi's manga of the same name. The story revolves around an eccentric samurai, Gintoki Sakata, his apprentice, Shinpachi Shimura, and a teenage alien girl named Kagura. All three are "freelancers" who search for work in order to pay the monthly rent, which usually goes unpaid anyway.

On January 8, 2009, the streaming video site Crunchyroll began offering English subtitled episodes of the series. The first available episode was episode 139. On the same day, Crunchyroll also began uploading episodes from the beginning of the series at a rate of two a week. Sunrise released the season in thirteen DVD volumes from on October 28, 2009, to October 27, 2010.

This season has been using six musical pieces: two opening themes and four endings themes. The first opening is "Stairway Generation" by Base Ball Bear and is replaced by "Light Infection" by Prague in episode 177. The first ending is "Asa Answer" (朝 Answer; lit. 'Morning Answer') by Pengin, while in episode 164 it replaced with "Wow I Nee" (ウォーアイニー, Wō Ai Nī; lit. 'I Love You') by Hitomi Takahashi and Beat Crusaders. Since episode 177 the ending theme is "Wonderful Days" (ワンダフルデイズ, Wandafuru Deizu) by One Draft and "Sayonara no Sora" (サヨナラの空; "Farewell Skies") by Qwai is used since episode 190. Episode 184 exchanges the use of the themes; with "Wonderful Days" as the opening and "Light Infection" as the ending theme.

== Episodes ==
No. overall	No. in season	Title	Original release date
151	1	"A Conversation With A Barber, During A Haircut, Is The Most Pointless Thing In The World"; Transliteration: "Kami kiri nagara kawasareru biyōshi to no kaiwa wa sekai de ichiban dō demo ii" (Japanese: 髪切りながら交わされる美容師との会話は世界で一番どうでもいい)	April 2, 2009
Gintoki visits a barber shop to get his hair cut. After Kagura mentions that the seventh volume of the manga Abu is missing, the barber runs off to buy the volume and leaves the Yorozuya to look after the shop. After a while Katsura and Kondo enter the shop to get an image change. Then the Shogun also enters the shop and wants a hair cut, too. The Yorozuya fall into despair because they don't even know how to cut hair properly.
152	2	"The Heavens Created Chonmage Above Man Instead Of Another Man"; Transliteration: "Ten wa hito no ue ni hito o tsukurazu mage o tsukurimashita" (Japanese: 天は人の上に人をつくらず髷をつくりました)	April 9, 2009
The Shogun wants Gintoki, Kagura and Shinpachi to redo his mage. After Kagura is trying to ask the Shogun how he wants his hair done, she vomits and a Naruto gets stuck on the Shogun's head. Then the three Yorozuya try removing it with a razor and accidentally cut off the Shogun's mage. To cover up their mistake they try to find a replacement for it.
153	3	"Sleep Helps A Child Grow"; Transliteration: "Neru ko wa sodatsu" (Japanese: 寝る子は育つ)	April 16, 2009
Kagura can't fall asleep, so she goes to Gintoki's room and troubles him about her problem. After few methods, she finally falls asleep while listening to a story from a radio show. Unfortunately Gintoki listened to this horror story as well, and now he can't fall asleep.
154	4	"That Person Looks Different From Usual During A Birthday Party"; Transliteration: "Tanjōbikai wa itsumo no aitsu ga chigau yatsu ni mieru." (Japanese: 誕生日会はいつものアイツが違う奴に見える)	April 23, 2009
Tojo is holding a surprise birthday party for Kyuubei. Among the people he invited are many celebrities and of course the Yorozuya, Katsura, Hasegawa, Otae and Kamenashi (All the people who went to the Ryugu castle) as well. Shinpachi doesn't want to stand out in the crowd of celebrities so he desperately tries to make Gin and the others behave properly.
155	5	"The Other Side Of The Other Side Of The Other Side Would Be The Other Side"; Transliteration: "Ura no ura no ura wa ura." (Japanese: 裏の裏の裏は裏)	April 30, 2009
Hasegawa is tired of always losing and being called a Madao, so together with Gintoki they bet on horse races. After many failures, Hasegawa tells him of his effort to leave the "Madao Spiral", unfortunate turn of events that happened since he gained the nickname. Together with Gintoki Madao decides to try one last time, betting on the horse Justaway. In the middle of the race Gintoki tells him that he bet on another horse and after a head on head race between Justaway and Gin's horse Cheap Impact, it seemed at first that Justaway won but then it got disqualified and Cheap Impact won instead. But by that time Gin has already shred his ticket into pieces and neither of them won.
156	6	"It Takes A Bit Of Courage To Enter A Street Vendor's Stand"; Transliteration: "Yatai ni hairu ni wa bimyō ni yūki ga iru." (Japanese: 屋台に入るには微妙に勇気がいる)	May 7, 2009
Almost all the episode is shown from the perspective of someone sitting in front of a street vendor. Gintoki seems to stop at the street vendor's to have a drink. Soon after, familiar people join for a drink. Eventually, the customers' identities are revealed and no one is as they seem.
157	7	"Any Place With Can Become a Battlefield When Men Gather"; Transliteration: "Otoko ga soroeba donna basho demo senjō ni naru." (Japanese: 男が揃えばどんな場所でも戦場になる)	May 14, 2009
The popular female singer Terakada Otsu gives a concert where Shinpachi and his fan club are as well. When they get out at the end of the concert, Shinpachi notices that there are only four members within his fan club left and all the other members quit and joined the Tsusengumi fan club instead, whose leader is no other than Toshirou Hijikata in his otaku character. As Shinpachi gets to the Yorozuya house and tells Gintoki about it, Toshi appears and after Shinpachi saw a TV announcement of Otsu's where she tells everyone that she will make a contest to decide which group will be her official fan club, the battle between the Tsusengumi and The Terakada Tsu Fan Club begins.
158	8	"If A Friend Gets Injured, Take Him To The Hospital, Stat!"; Transliteration: "Tomodachi ga Kegashitara sugu ni Byōin e." (Japanese: 友達がケガしたらすぐに病院へ)	May 21, 2009
Hijikata reveals himself as not the Otaku Toshi but as the real Hijikata who dressed up in his Otaku form. His reason to participate in the contest to become Otsu's Official Fan Club is, to cleanse himself from Toshi, the Otaku and gain full control over his body again. As Gintoki and the others arrive at the location the contest'll start, they find themselves in the middle of 5000 Otaku who'll all participate as well. The first round is to run 10 km to the Oedo TV Station. If only one member of a team gives up, the whole team'll be disqualified. After sending Kagura to run ahead, Taka-chin is run over by the cab that Okita rides in. Shinpachi's and Gintoki's fear of losing causes them to carry Taka-chin to the TV station instead of taking him to a hospital. Unfortunately they meet Yamazaki who is also participating in the contest.
159	9	"If One Orange In The Box Is Rotten, The Rest Of Them Will Become Rotten Before You Realize It"; Transliteration: "Mikan wa Ikko Kusaru to Itsu no Ma ni ka Danbōru-jū no Mikan o Kusaraseru" (Japanese: みかんは一個腐るといつの間にかダンボール中のみかんを腐らせる)	May 28, 2009
While Kagura races ahead, she runs into Kondo who is participating as well. Yamazaki tells Gintoki then that he, together with Okita, Kondo and Hijikata participates in this contest. Meanwhile Kagura races against Kondo, but both running in the wrong direction. When Yamazaki finally notices that Taka-chin is injured, Gintoki takes him to a hospital and Shinpachi runs ahead of him. Somehow Gintoki returns very quickly with a not very look-alike replacement of Taka-chin. After running as fast as he can, Shinpachi finally reaches the crowd racing in front of him, but all of a sudden they form a Genbu wall to prevent Shinpachi from passing through. Shinpachi then desperately tries to make himself a way through the crowd and in the end runs on the rail of the bridge the Otakus are crossing.
160	10	"From A Foreigner's Perspective, You're The Foreigner. From An Alien's Perspective, You're The Alien"; Transliteration: "Gaikokujin kara Mitara Kocchi mo Gaikokujin, Uchūjin kara Mitara Kocchi mo Uchūjin" (Japanese: 外国人から見たらこっちも外国人 宇宙人から見たらこっちも宇宙人)	June 4, 2009
One after another the team members of The Tsusengumi and Terakado Tsu Fan Club enter the finish line. Therefore the second round consisting of a quiz show, will be held with this two remaining teams. Yet, after Shinpachi got disqualified and Hijikata got eliminated, the rest is now up to the remaining members consisting of Gin, Kagura and Taka-chin, and on the other side of Okita, Kondo and Yamazaki. After mere lucky answered questions by Taka-chin, it seems that Shinpachi's team's about to win but then loses after few circumstances. Now the two teams are entering the second contest of the final round, a Glamour Showdown.
161	11	"Laputa's Still Good After Seeing It So Many Times"; Transliteration: "Nankai Mite mo Rapyuta wa Ii" (Japanese: 何回見てもラピュタはいい)	June 11, 2009
The two teams are now entering a Charisma Contest where they have to hit on Otsu and try to get her to a place somewhere with nice and quiet accommodations (shortly a love hotel), but of course this will only be a simulation. First are The Tsusengumi. After deciding on Hijikata as the one who'll be hitting on Otsu they set off a scene in a bar. In the end he successfully manages to get Otsu to go with him to a love hotel. The next turn is Terakado Tsu Fan Club. Therefore, Gintoki sets off an adventure scene in the desert, which has nothing to do with a romantic situation. But in the end they too succeed in getting Otsu in the Garanda Vehotel (sounds like Grand Love Hotel). Then Otsu decides on the winner, who are the members of the Terakado Tsu Fan Club. Now each team has won and lost one contest. The competition enters its final match.
162	12	"Love Is Unconditional"; Transliteration: "Ai towa Mushō no Mono Nari." (Japanese: 愛とは無償のものなり)	June 18, 2009
The final battle begins. In the boxing ring Hijikata and Shinpachi face off in an Otsu Card battle. Toshi, having the upper hand, easily dominates. Shinpachi, drawing Bassist Kim cards, is seemingly out of luck until he manages to turn it around with the sacrifice of Kim's mole. Shinpachi draws Drummer Kiyoshi card, unfortunately Kim and Kiyoshi seem to have had a bad fight over who ate a pizza. Hijikata using a Stylist card boosting his attack power. Shinpachi uses his mystery investigation card, which reveals someone else ate the pizza. Kim and Kiyoshi make up and play together overwhelming Hijikata's attack power, sending Hijikata flying.
163	13	"The Black Ships Even Make A Scene When They Sink"; Transliteration: "Kurofune wa Shizumu Toki mo Hade" (Japanese: 黒船は沈む時も派手)	June 25, 2009
Shinpachi's attack drains Hijikata's life points slowly, when suddenly the otaku Toshi takes control of Hijikata's body and attacks with a card called Dizon, which drops both Toshi's and Shinpachi's life points to zero. Despite no cards and life points left, the two rivals continue fighting, turning the fight into a boxing match. After a magnificent battle, Hijikata is freed from Toshi and Shinpachi gives up the title of the official fan club and continues to be the leader of his own fan club.
164	14	"That Matsutake Soup Stuff Tastes Better Than The Real Deal"; Transliteration: "Matsutake no Osuimonotte Are Honmono Yori Umai yo ne" (Japanese: 松茸のお吸い物ってアレ ホンモノよりうまいよね)	July 2, 2009
164	14	"If a Person Is Dead, They Can't Come Back To Life"; Transliteration: "Hito wa Shindara Ikikaeranai" (Japanese: 人は死んだら生き返らない)	July 2, 2009
There is a new Yorozuya in town therefore Gin, Shinpachi and Kagura are heading out to shut them down. On the way there they meet several people who praise the new Yorozuya. Hearing this, they dash into the office and it happens that the members of the new Yorozuya are the predecessors of Kagura and Shinpachi. Shinpachi meets a robot from the future who tells him that he is here to help and protect him from robots from Skynet. After both talk to each other and the robot tells him a bit about the future, he notices that he mistook Shinpachi for a boy named Connor and takes his leave.
165	15	"If It Works Once, It'll Work Over And Over Again"; Transliteration: "Yanagi no Shita Ni Dojō wa Takusan Iru" (Japanese: 柳の下にどじょうは沢山いる)	July 9, 2009
Gin has caught a cold in the middle of summer, so Shinpachi comes to visit him at the Yorozuya's place. There Gin tells him he feels so sick that he does not care about a thing anymore. Disappointed about hearing this, Shinpachi recalls a memory from an influenza which infected all his friends. In the past, Shinpachi is forced to look after Otae, Gintoki, Kagura, Sa-chan and Kondo. They are later joined by Hasegawa who is completely covered with the virus. Katsura later arrives but has become "Ill Smith" (a parody of Will Smith) due to the virus although he is immune to the virus's effects. He begins curing the others by absorbing the viruses but due to Kondo, the viruses Katsura collected are released turning all but Shinpachi into "Ill Smith."
166	16	"Two Is Better Than One. Two People Are Better Than One"; Transliteration: "Hitotsu Yori Futatsu Hitori Yori Futari" (Japanese: 一つより二つ 一人より二人)	July 16, 2009
Hijikata is in the middle of an investigation when Gintoki turns up and picks a fight with him. After their argue, Hijikata arrests him by putting hand cuffs on his and Gintoki's hand, for interfering with his investigation and offending a police officer. He then calls Okita to take Gintoki to the office, but instead of doing as he said, Okita puts another pair of handcuffs on both their free hands to bind them together. As Okita refuses to give them the key and leaves, Hijikata forces Gintoki to join the investigation.
167	17	"Smooth Polygons Smooth Men's Hearts Too"; Transliteration: "Nameraka na Porigon wa Hito no Kokoro mo Nameraka ni Suru" (Japanese: なめらかなポリゴンは人の心もなめらかにする)	July 23, 2009
Tama is cleaning up the Snack Shop when Otose joins her and notices that she looks like a Polygon figure. She sends Tama to buy things and asks Gintoki what may have happened to her. When Tama comes back she is pixelated and her condition got worse. Clueless about what to do, the three Yorozuya bring her to Gengai, who specializes in machines. He tells them that she caught a computer virus and after shrinking them to puppet size, he sends the three Yorozuya to look what's going on in Tama's body. The first thing they find is a man in a bodysuit, dying and asking them to deliver a message to the Leukocyte King. After this incident their first stop is at the Leukocyte Kingdom.
168	18	"The Human Body Is Like A Little Universe"; Transliteration: "Hito no Karada wa Shōuchū" (Japanese: 人の身体は小宇宙)	July 30, 2009
After their arrival at the Leukocyte Kingdom, the whole area looks like a RPG. As they stop by several shops, they meet a little Tama inside Tama's body and together they head to the castle where they ask the Leukocyte King for aid. But after few minutes it turns out that the King and all the other Leukocyte are in truth Tapir, the enemies. As they try to escape after a battle, they are attacked by the former King, but are saved by the real Leukocyte King who looks just like Gintoki. Then they all together head out to the main castle to destroy the virus.
169	19	"The Chosen Idiots"; Transliteration: "Michibikareshi Baka Tachi" (Japanese: 導かれしバカたち)	August 6, 2009
As Gin and the others arrive at the main castle of the archfiend Tapir, they think of a plan on how to infiltrate the castle but Gin and the Leukocyte King begin to quarrel because they both prefer another way of attacking. Finally Kagura makes a move and draws the enemy out while suggesting Gin and the others should attack the castle. But instead of using this chance to head for the castle, Gin and the Leukocyte King begin to quarrel again and after defeating the guards, Kagura has drawn out, with their power, they somehow make it into the castle and are now facing the Final Enemy or the Tapir King who turns out to be Tama herself. Tama believes that the Leukocyte King is unable to attack her due to her appearance, Gintoki then sends a flying kick into her face, which shocks Kagura, Shinpachi and the Leukocyte King.
170	20	"And Into The Legend..."; Transliteration: "Soshite Densetsu e" (Japanese: そして伝説へ)	August 13, 2009
Gintoki continues to hit Tama under the belief that the archfiend talks too long and that this person isn't Tama herself. To prevent Gintoki from hurting Tama anymore, he again begins to quarrel with him and then suddenly Tama turns into the former Leukocyte King, Fortega, the father of the current Leukocyte King because she believes this will soften their hearts and prevent them from attacking him/her anymore. But unfortunately it's a complete failure and now he gets kicks from all the three Yorozuya. Anyhow, after this he falls from his balcony, and is no longer attached to Tama's system. Gintoki and the others use this chance to defeat him, but then he turns into a big monster and because Kagura and Shinpachi are now pixelated and Gintoki slowly as well, the Leukocyte King and Gintoki decide to work together and defeat the Tapir King. Releasing too much power the Leukocyte King begins to vanish but is saved by Tama and in the end of the episode is seen to face another kind of danger in Tama's body.
171	21	"If You Keep Copying, They Will Retaliate"; Transliteration: "Mane Bakari Shite Iru to Uttaerareru" (Japanese: 真似ばかりしていると訴えられる)	August 20, 2009
171	21	"A Loss Open Your Eyes To The Love You Have"; Transliteration: "Nakunatte Hajimete Wakaru Itooshisa" (Japanese: なくなって初めてわかるいとおしさ)	August 20, 2009
Two burglars break into Gintoki's house to steal some money. But while searching for the money, many people turn up at Gintoki's house. The two are trying to deal with the different persons and in the end run into Gintoki himself. After waking up, Gintoki notices, while taking a bath, that his hair begins to fall out. Freaked out by that, he runs to Kagura and for some reason she has lost part of her hair, too. Then Shinpachi turns up and after the other two point out that the back of his head lost all his hair, they desperately try to find out the reason why they are losing their hair.
172	22	"Using The 'Carrot And Stick' Method Depends On The Situation"; Transliteration: "Ame to Muchi wa Tsukaiyō" (Japanese: アメとムチは使いよう)	August 27, 2009
A murderer who killed 35 government employees, Kohei Tanaka, is being brought to the Shinsengumi office. Because he will not admit his crime, Kondo, Hijikata, Okita and Yamazaki have to make him spit everything out. Before they go in, they decide to try and use the "Carrot and Stick" method. One after another they go into the interrogation room and try to make him admit the crimes he has committed.
173	23	"It's What's On The Inside That Counts"; Transliteration: "Daiji na no wa Mitame de wa Naku Nakami" (Japanese: 大事なのは見た目ではなく中身)	September 4, 2009
173	23	"It's What's On The Inside That Counts, But Only To A Certain Extent"; Transliteration: "Mitame de wa Naku Nakami to Ittemo Gendo ga Aru" (Japanese: 見た目ではなく中身といっても限度がある)	September 4, 2009
When Gintoki goes for a walk with Sadaharu, he runs into Katsura and Elizabeth. But somehow Elizabeth does not look the way it always does and the point is that Katsura himself doesn't even notice it. Then Gintoki, Kagura and Shinpachi try to open Katsura's eyes by using different methods. Shortly after waking up, Gintoki notices that he somehow switched in Sadaharu's body, and Sadaharu is now in Gin's body. When neither Shinpachi nor Kagura notice that something is wrong with him, Gin takes Sadaharu and goes outside, where they meet Katsura and many other people, whom Gintoki wants to notice the body switch.
174	24	"Are There Still People Who Go To The Ocean And Yell Out 'Bakayaro'?"; Transliteration: "Umi ni Mukatte Bakayarō toka Iu Hito tte Mada Iru no Darō ka" (Japanese: 海に向かってバカヤローとか言う人ってまだいるのだろうか)	September 10, 2009
174	24	"When A Person Is Trapped, Their Inner Door Opens"; Transliteration: "Hito wa Tojikomerareru to Jibun no Naka no Tobira ga Hiraku" (Japanese: 人は閉じ込められると自分の中の扉が開く)	September 10, 2009
People who look like yakuza are in Gintoki's house and seem to threaten him over some matter. At the same time people from the same group are at Hasegawa's house about doing the same thing. After one of them makes a call, somehow Gin, Kagura, Shinpachi and Hasegawa end up in a boat in the middle of the ocean, fishing for some tuna. And another person is on the boat, a man with a turtle shell on his back. After a quite well paid job, waiting for the elevator, the three Yorozuya are deciding to go out and eat Korean BBQ. But when they get on the elevator together with an old man, they notice after a while that they're stuck. And after they run out of plans to get out, Shinpachi desperately tries to liven up the mood.
175	25	"No Matter How Old You Get, You Still Hate The Dentist!"; Transliteration: "Ikutsu ni Nattemo Haisha wa Iya" (Japanese: 幾つになっても歯医者は嫌)	September 17, 2009
Gin has a toothache from eating too much sweets so he has to go to the dentist. There he meets Hijikata who has the same problem. Together they are waiting for their turn but the longer they wait the more scared they become because they constantly hear screams out of the dentist's room. Finally when they are called in, they get tied to the chair and the torture begins.
176	26	"Countdown Begins"; Transliteration: "Kaunto Daun Kaishi" (Japanese: カウントダウン開始)	September 24, 2009
Gintoki and the other two Yorozuya are making a countdown with the best lines said by all the characters in the anime.
177	27	"It's Bad Luck To See A Spider At Night"; Transliteration: "Yoru no Kumo wa Engi ka Warui" (Japanese: 夜の蜘蛛は縁起が悪い)	October 1, 2009
Tsukuyo hires Odd Jobs Gin to help her stop the most recent criminals appearing in Yoshiwara. Acting as a married thugs couple, Gintoki and Tsukuyo infiltrate into a group of thieves but they later discover that they only want to steal kamaboko. They escape from the organization and investigate another one whose members have tattoos of spiders on their bodies. Shinpachi and Kagura learn of the same organization but are warned of their leader. The organization discovers Gintoki and Tsukuyo, and their leader ambushes Gintoki.
178	28	"Once You're Entangled In A Spiderweb, It's Hard To Get It Off"; Transliteration: "Kumo no ito wa ichido karamaru to nakanaka torenai" (Japanese: 蜘蛛の糸は一度絡まるとなかなかとれない)	October 8, 2009
Gintoki and Tsukuyo infiltrate the Benigumoto, the Red Spiders, to get a lead on the man with the tattooed spider on his neck, but are discovered and quickly surrounded. The two manage to fend for themselves, when the man with the tattooed spider makes a sudden appearance and attacks Gintoki! The man then speaks as if he knows Tsukuyo. Who is this man?!
179	29	"It's The Irresponsible One Who's Scary When Pissed"; Transliteration: "Charanporan na yatsu hodo ikaru to kowai" (Japanese: チャランポランな奴程怒ると恐い)	October 15, 2009
Tsukuyo falls into the hands of Jiraia, her former master, and is held captive. Meanwhile Gintoki manages to survive the attack thanks to Zenzo, and he learns about Jiraia's past. During the Amanto attack twenty years ago, Jiraia is said to have killed his own people within the Oniwabanshu, all for the sake of his devotion to the previous shogun. In the end Jiraia himself was the one to be terminated, but he managed to escape. Now his devotion is directed toward his own creation, Tsukuyo. Jiraia's motive is to eliminate the bond that she has come to rely upon. And he intends to achieve that goal by setting fire to Yoshiwara and burning down everything!
180	30	"The More Precious The Burden, The Heavier And More Difficult It Is To Shoulder It"; Transliteration: "Taisetsu na ni hodo omoku seoi gatai" (Japanese: 大切な荷ほど重く背負い難い)	October 22, 2009
A flashback from Gintoki's childhood shows how he met his teacher when he used to steal from corpses. With his teacher taking care of him, Gintoki proceeds to fight Jiraia to show that he does not deserve to be teacher due to how he made Tsukuyo suffer. By evading all of Jiraia's attacks with counterattacking, Gintoki escapes from his spiderweb and starts beating him up until overwhelming him. Jiraia still attempts to kill Gintoki, but Tsukuyo throws a kunai to his neck. Hattori then reveals that after Jiraia's sister committed suicide to avoid seeing his brother working as an assassin, since then Jiraia has lost his mind. Before Jiraia dies, Tsukuyo holds him up showing that she can carry her burden.
181	31	"Watch Out For A Set Of Women And A Drink"; Transliteration: "Sake to onna wa wansetto de ki o tsukero" (Japanese: 酒と女はワンセットで気をつけろ)	October 29, 2009
Hinowa asks Odd Jobs to cheer up Tsukuyo for what happened, but Gintoki is beaten up by Tsukuyo when he accidentally touches her chest. As Gintoki realizes that Tsukuyo does not want her friends to worry about her state, he goes to the pachinko. Later, women from Yoshiwara take Gintoki to a room where he finds Tsukuyo working as a courtesan. As both Tsukuyo and Gintoki discover they were tricked by Hinowa so that Gintoki could help Tsukuyo, Gintoki tells Tsukuyo to drink sake with him as it is all free. However, Tsukuyo grows violent when drinking alcohol and she starts attacking Odd Jobs, Seita, and Hinowa. Before leaving, Tsukuyo has a talk with Gintoki and tells Odd Jobs that she is happy she met them.
182	32	"Screw Popularity Votes"; Transliteration: "Ninkitouhyou nante kuso kurae" (Japanese: 人気投票なんて糞食らえ)	November 5, 2009
The second character popularity poll from the manga is made in the anime to celebrate the DVDs' good sales and the making of a film of Gintama. Ranking 8th again, Shinpachi has a chat with 9th-ranked Yamazaki about their lack of popularity. Later, Shinpachi finds a wounded naked Yamazaki with his ranking now being 136. With Yamazaki's "last words" being to protect the ranking, Shinpachi searches for help. He finds that Sa-chan, Otae and Kyubei want to attack the top ten characters with 9th ranked Tsukuyo (her place being now the one of Yamazaki) being their first target. Angry with the large number of female characters in the series, Otae decides to kill the Hideaki Sorachi (who had a better rank than her) making the animation of the series deteriorate until the screen is left black.
183	33	"Popularity Polls Can Burn In Hell"; Transliteration: "Ninkitouhyou nante moete hai ni nare" (Japanese: 人気投票なんて燃えて灰になれ)	November 12, 2009
Shinpachi goes to ask for top-ranked Gintoki but is interrupted by the series' new author Guronson, who changes the setting. After "Cyborg Sorachi" appears to have killed Guronson, Shinpachi is attacked by the smaller-ranked characters who want his place. Gintoki and second-ranked Okita hide him in a building where the other high ranks are also hiding. When Gintoki and Hijikata reveal their desire to monopolize the top, Shinpachi escapes. He finds Tsukuyo who accidentally destroys Otae's ranking, making her decide to stop her quest. Tsukuyo instead allies with the girls, making all their rank be ninth and name themselves Diamond Perform Unit. Shinpachi returns to the hideout, but is threatened by Okita who thinks that he plans to betray them, suspecting he also attacked Hasegawa.
184	34	"Popularity Polls Can..."; Transliteration: "Ninkitouhyou nante ..." (Japanese: 人気投票なんて･･･)	November 19, 2009
The hidden characters start fighting between each other, and all of them are surprised that although Kondo is naked his rank is still the same. Otae kicks Kondo, and Kagura joins Diamond, turning the fight into a "war of sexes". Kondo pretends to join the Diamond group only to reduce their rank with his embarrassing actions, and Kagura and Okita start dressing him with formal and informal clothes, respectively. When Sa-chan and Tsukuyo argue about their reasons to fight, Elizabeth and Sadaharu join forces to attack Diamond. Hasegawa then helps Gintoki and Shinpachi to discover the one who created the war was Yamazaki. Having pretended he was attacked, Yamazaki's trick made all the characters fight between each other to reduce their ranks, but Shinpachi convinces him the only important thing is that they can recognize themselves they are important. After that, Shinpachi and Yamazaki's rank become number one, and the other characters toss them in celebration only to throw them out of the building.
185	35	"Hometowns And Boobs Are Best Thought From Afar"; Transliteration: "Kokyou to oppai wa tooku ni arite omou mono" (Japanese: 故郷とおっぱいは遠くにありて思うもの)	November 26, 2009
185	35	"The Whole Peeing On A Bee Sting Is A Myth. You'll Get Germs, So Don't Do It!!"; Transliteration: "Hachi ni sasaretara shouben kakerotte are ha meishin desu baikin ga hairu kara ki o tsukeyou ne!!" (Japanese: 蜂に刺されたら小便かけろってアレは迷信です バイ菌が入るから気をつけようね！！)	November 26, 2009
Hijikata learns that if he finds a golden ticket he can go to the mayonnaise factory "Mayorin". Due to how hard it is to find the ticket, he orders each Shinsegumi to consume five bottles of mayonnaise per day. Okita discovers why, and when Yamazaki finds a ticket, he tells him to go the factory. However, Kondo and Yamazaki allow Hijikata to take the ticket to go the factory. Much to his discouragement, Hijikata discovers Mayorin is a common factory when imagined it would be a magical place. A group of monks hire Odd Jobs to get rid of a giant alien beehive that appeared in their temple. Kagura kicks it, causing the death of the queen bee who was hit with a PlayStation 3 in the moment. The yakuza bees threaten Odd Jobs to conquer the Earth, and Gintoki tells them he can revive the queen. Instead, he goes to another hive to find a replacement for the queen but accidentally kills her. In their next attempt, a queen is wounded, and the bees from the three hives start fighting between each other to know who will conquer Earth. In the war, every group loses, and Odd Jobs discover the queens survived.
186	36	"Beware Of Foreshadows"; Transliteration: "Shibou furagu ni ki o tsukero" (Japanese: 死亡フラグに気をつけろ)	December 3, 2009
A girl named Kirie tries to kill Okita in revenge for her father's death in the Rokkaku Incident despite her father was only protecting his family, but fails. Okita takes her to Odd Jobs thinking Gintoki is a slave driver. He tells Kirie he does not remember her father and that if she gets in his way again, he will kill her. The other survivor from such incident, Shinsengumi Kamiyama, tells Okita he will confess he was Kirie's father's murder, but Okita threatens him not to do it. Later, Kagura tries to make Okita reveal the truth, but she is interrupted by a gang who participated in the incident holding Kirie as a hostage. Gintoki encounters Kamiyama who reveals that he was the one who accidentally killed Kirie's father, and Okita decided to keep it a secret. The gang captures both Kagura and Okita when he tells he will kill Kirie.
187	37	"It's Goodbye Once A Flag Is Set"; Transliteration: "Furagu o fundara sayounara" (Japanese: フラグを踏んだらサヨウナラ)	December 10, 2009
The faction leader is about to tell Kirie her father aided them in the Rokkaku Incident when Kagura headbutts her, leaving her unconscious. Kamiyama tells Gintoki and Shinpachi the same information, and explains that Okita wanted to keep her father's role in the war a secret to avoid bringing shame to his name, as he was only trying to protect his family. While the faction prepares to kill Okita, he and Kagura escape from them with the prior pretending he needs to go the bathroom and the latter attacking the group with her vomit. The faction shoots Kagura, and Okita decides to let her escape with Kirie, while he confronts them, revealing also that he wants Kirie to keep judging him as the murderer to have a reason to live. When Okita becomes exhausted, the Shinsengumi, Gintoki and Shinpachi defeat all the remaining members from the faction. Some days later, Okita receives a threatening letter from Kirie, who heard what was his desire.
188	38	"An Observation Journal Should Be Seen Through To The Very End"; Transliteration: "Kansatsu Nikki wa Saigo made Yarikirou" (Japanese: 観察日記は最後までやりきろう)	December 17, 2009
The episode is in the form of an observation diary from a student named Daigoro, who met Hasegawa some time ago. Daigoro lets Hasegawa stay at his house and eventually mentions his father, who left him and his mother after losing his job and cheating on his wife. After arguing with his mother, Daigoro lets Hasegawa stay at their home where he starts a relationship with his mother. In a job interview, Hasegawa meets Daigoro's father who now wants to return to his family and is also applying for the same job. Hasegawa deliberately causes trouble at the workplace and gives up his employment to Daigoro's father. Daigoro berates Hasegawa for screwing up his chance at employment, all the while suspecting Hasegawa did something for his father. In the closing credits of the diary, all of the students and the teacher are moved to the point of tears by the story, but the teacher becomes surprised when he discovers the journal was written by Daigoro's mother.
189	39	"It's Better To Take Care Of This Year's Business Within The Year, But Once The Year Is About To End, You Figure That You Might As Well Put It Off Till Next Year For A Fresh Start. That's How The End Of The Year Goes"; Transliteration: "Kotoshi dekiru Koto wa Kotoshijuu ni Yacchatta Hou ga Kugiri iindakedo Tsui Rainen kara Shikirinaosha Iiyatte Omotte Atomawashi ni Shiteshimau no ga Nenmatsu no Oyakusoku" (Japanese: 今年できる事は今年中にやっちゃった方が区切りいいんだけど つい来年から仕切り直しゃいーやって思って後回しにしてしまうのが年末のお約束)	December 24, 2009
189	39	"Radio Exercises Are Socials For Boys And Girls"; Transliteration: "Rajio Taisou wa Shounen Shoujo no Shakouba" (Japanese: ラジオ体操は少年少女の社交場)	December 24, 2009
While researching the Anti-Foreigner War, a reporter interviews Nagai, a former reporter from the war, in order to know about the White Demon's (Gintoki's alter-ego) activities during that time. He chronicles the events from war, explaining how the samurais decided to fight against the aliens. As Nagai is about to talk about the White Demon, he replaces him with the fictional robot Gundam to celebrate the 30th anniversary of the franchise with the same name. Kagura starts going to Kabuki-cho's physical fitness lessons where she meets a kid named Hongou Hisashi, whom she befriends. Suffering from a dangerous disease that weakens his body, Hisashi is absent from various lessons even though he promised Kagura to go to every lesson. During a rainy day, Kagura is the only person to come to the lesson, but Gintoki and her friends decide to join her. Next day, Hisashi returns to another lesson and sees Kagura once again.
190	40	"When Looking For Something, Try Using Its Perspective"; Transliteration: "Sagashi mono o suru toki wa soitsu no mesen ni natte sagase" (Japanese: 捜しものをする時はそいつの目線になって捜せ)	January 7, 2010
While on a job observing stray cats at a shrine feeding themselves, the Yorozuya wait for the boss cat with the name Hoichi to show up. But as he finally shows up, and Kagura and Shinpachi jump out of the bushes to capture him, he escapes easily. So they ask Gintoki to help out, when they notice that he mysteriously disappeared.
191	41	"Freedom Means To Live True To Yourself, Not Without Law!"; Transliteration: "Jiyū to wa muhou de wa naku onore no rūru de ikiru koto" (Japanese: 自由とは無法ではなく己のルールで生きること)	January 14, 2010
Having turned into cats, Gintoki, Katsura and Kondo (who turned into a gorilla) are brought by Hoichi to Otose to get food. While eating, Otose tells them that if caught, they can never return to this town.
192	42	"Kabukicho Stray Cat Blues"; Transliteration: "Kabuki-chou Noraneko Burūsu" (Japanese: かぶき町野良猫ブルース)	January 21, 2010
While protecting Gintoki from the stray cats, Hoichi and the cats get caught. Soon Gintoki, Katsura and Kondo go to save him.
193	43	"Cooking Is About Guts"; Transliteration: "Ryouri wa Konjou" (Japanese: 料理は根性)	January 28, 2010
After eating egg over rice for three days straight, Gintoki is fed up with Kagura being the cook in charge and doesn't want any egg over rice. Frustrated by Gin's reaction Kagura goes over to Shinpachi's house to talk to Otae. Then Otae asks her if she wants to join a cooking class with her. Together with Shinpachi and other odd faces they start the cooking class.
194	44	"Whenever I Hear Leviathan, I Think Of Sazae-san. Stupid Me!!"; Transliteration: "Rivaiasan tte kitara doushitemo Sazae-san ga chiratsuku ore no baka!!" (Japanese: リヴァイアサンってきいたらどうしてもサザエさんがチラつく俺のバカ！！)	February 4, 2010
The episode begins with a short sequence about Kamui transferring into Yato High School and it is told from Abuto's point of view. While the Shinsengumi are out on a mission, Hijikata notices snot coming out of Kondo's nose so he wonders how he could tell him without the others noticing Kondo's problem. In the end the snot even takes control over Kondo's body and it comes out that the snot's true identity is being an Amanto. As Hijikata destroys it, he realizes it has been all a dream.
195	45	"Not Losing To The Rain"; Transliteration: "Ame ni mo makezu" (Japanese: 雨ニモ負ケズ)	February 11, 2010
Lately the weather forecasts Ketsuno Ana is predicting are always wrong. When Gintoki meets her on the streets he takes her to the Yorozuya's place to help her. But after a monster attacks the house, it is revealed that Ketsuno Ana is an Onmyoji and some other Onmyoji is targeting her. After that Gintoki and the others are on the way to the Ketsuno residence, where they fight some odd creatures.
196	46	"Not Losing To The Wind"; Transliteration: "Kaze ni mo makezu" (Japanese: 風ニモ負ケズ)	February 18, 2010
Weather girl Ketsuno Ana is giving the wrong weather forecast. Turns out she comes from a line of traditional Onmyojis, and her forecast is not derived from mere fortune-telling but actually by using her Onmyoji powers. But her weather forecast is being sabotaged by someone who is unhappy with Ketsuno Ana's career as a weather girl despite her being an Onmyoji. Gintoki and the gang arrive at the Onmyoji mansion where they come face to face with Seimei, Ketsuno Ana's older brother.
197	47	"Not Losing To The Storm"; Transliteration: "Arashi ni mo makezu" (Japanese: 嵐ニモ負ケズ)	February 25, 2010
In order to save Ketsuno Ana, Seimei agrees to Douman's proposal of a shikigami Tag-Team Mystic Death Match. Seimei arrives at the arena only to be captured by Douman, but Gintoki and the gang appear to lend a helping hand. The first match ends in a draw after both the Ketsuno and Shirino clan contestants are disqualified. After seeing how they performed in the first round, Seimei accepts Gintoki and the gang's skills, and together they prepare for the next round. Rather than making a casting spells fight, Gintoki and Ketsuno Ana's shikigami, Gedomaru, try to beat up Douman, but are caught in one of Douman's illusion and Gintoki has his testicles rip off by Gedomaru's weapon. As Gintoki's testicles are accidentally damaged by Gedomaru, Seimei decides to fight Douman alone while the shikigami heal Gintoki.
198	48	"Never Losing That Smile"; Transliteration: "Ikanaru Toki ni mo Egao o Tayasanai" (Japanese: イカナル時ニモ笑顔ヲ絶ヤサナイ)	March 4, 2010
Seimei takes the risk of being dismissed as lead guardian of Edo by undoing the Shikigami placed throughout the city, and fueling himself with all their power to face Douman. Their fierce magic clashes, and Douman is forced intodefensive as Seimei's techniques overwhelm him. Just when the battle seems over, Douman recalls the history between his family and the Ketsuno clan as repeatedly told by his father.
199	49	"That's How I Wish To Be, Beautiful And Strong"; Transliteration: "Sonna Tsuyoku Utsukushi Mono ni Watashi wa Naritai" (Japanese: ソンナ強ク美シイモノニ私ハナリタイ)	March 11, 2010
Consumed by negative emotions, Douman is transformed into a giant demon. He now possesses within his body Antenmaru, a demon sealed away over a millennium ago by the desperate efforts of the Ketsuno and Shirino clans. As Seimei is about to be killed by Antenmaru, Gintoki stands before him with his aura-charged wooden sword. Gintoki charges his sword with everybody's energy including Douman's in order to overwhelm Antenmaru and bring a sunny day. After Antenmaru is destroyed, Gintoki leaves so that Ketsuno Ana will not know about the fight. However, he requests Gedomaru to make Ketsuno Ana give him her autograph. Douman appears alive and ends up having a childish fight against Seimei. As Odd Jobs leave, Ketsuno Ana expresses her thanks to Gintoki in her weather forecast.
200	50	"Santa Claus Red Is Blood Red"; Transliteration: "Santa Kurōsu no Aka wa Chi no Iro" (Japanese: サンタクロースの赤は血の色)	March 18, 2010
It's Christmas in Edo and Kagura writes her father a letter. She is sad that Santa Claus never visited her. Moved, her father Umibozu dresses himself up as Santa and hides watching Kagura, Otae, Shinpachi and Hasegawa celebrate Christmas. When he finally jumps out of the bushes to surprise her there is another Santa, a dressed up Gintoki. Both of them think that their counterpart is real. They start punching each other when another three Santas show up (Sa-chan, Kondo and Kyubei). Kagura decides on a contest to see who's the real Santa.
201	51	"Everybody's A Santa"; Transliteration: "Jinrui mina Santa!" (Japanese: 人類みなサンタ!)	March 25, 2010
The contest has finally begun but instead of a real contest to decide who's the real Santa, Kagura, Otae and the five Santas together with Shinpachi and Hasegawa are shown in various scenes playing a role like a school girl and not fighting each other like in a real contest. In each scene they imagine the Santa has to show his kind of version what he would do as Santa and this is judged by Kagura, Otae and Hasegawa. Although in the end none of the Santas has any desire to continue with this contest so they all quit. The episode ends with Kagura, all along figured out the identity of everyone, wishing everybody a Merry Christmas.
