= Gintama' =

- Cover of the first Gintama' DVD, released in July 2011
- No. of episodes: 51

Release
- Original network: TV Tokyo
- Original release: April 4, 2011 – March 26, 2012

Season chronology
- ← Previous; Season 4 Next → Gintama': Enchōsen

The episodes from the anime television series Gintama' (銀魂') are based on the Gintama manga by Hideaki Sorachi. The series premiered in TV Tokyo on April 4, 2011. It is a sequel of the first Gintama anime that ended in April 2010. The main staff from the first TV series remain in Gintama with Yoichi Fujita as the director. The story revolves around an eccentric samurai, Gintoki Sakata, his apprentice, Shinpachi Shimura, and a teenage alien girl named Kagura. All three are "freelancers" who search for work in order to pay the monthly rent, which usually goes unpaid anyway. Crunchyroll simulcasted the premiere of Gintama' and its following episodes to subscribers from its site. The first DVD from the series was released on July 27, 2011.

Gintama' uses seven pieces of theme music: three openings and four endings. The first opening theme, "Tōgenkyō Alien" (桃源郷エイリアン, Tōgenkyō Eirian; lit. 'Alien Fairyland') by Serial TV Drama, is used from episodes 1 to 26. The second opening theme, "Jirenma" (ジレンマ, Dilemma; lit. 'Dilemma') by ecosystem, is used from episodes 27 to 39. The third opening theme, "Wonderland" by FLiP, is used from episodes 40 to 51. The first ending theme, "Samurai Heart (Some Like It Hot!!)" (サムライハート (Some Like It Hot!!), Samurai Hāto (Some Like It Hot!!)) by SPYAIR, is used from episodes 1 to 13. The second ending theme, "Balance Doll" by Prague, is used from episodes 14 to 26. The third ending theme, "Anagura" (アナグラ, Anagura; lit. 'Cellular') by Kuroneko Chelsea, is used from episodes 27 to 39. The fourth ending theme, "Nakama" (仲間, Nakama; lit. 'Friends') by Good Coming, is used from episode 40 to 51.

== Episodes ==
No. overall	No. in season	Title	Original release date
202	1	"Everyone Looks a Little Grown Up After Spring Break"; Transliteration: "Haruyasumi Ake wa Minna Chotto Otona ni Mieru" (Japanese: 春休み明けは皆ちょっと大人に見える)	April 4, 2011
Shinpachi Shimura returns to the Yorozuya and discovers his friends drastically changed during the break. Feeling left behind, he returns home and discovers his sister, Tae Shimura, engaged to Isao Kondo. Tae and Kondo enlist Shinpachi into the Shinsengumi and reveal that Tae is pregnant. Shinpachi runs to the ocean and laments the sudden changes of those around him. There, he learns about Kyubei Yagyu's sex change to modify her life. They are interrupted by Kotaro Katsura, who also changed his gender due to his and Kyubei's characters' similarities.
203	2	"Everyone Looks Pretty Grown Up After Summer Break"; Transliteration: "Natsuyasumi Ake mo Minna Kekkou Otona ni Mieru" (Japanese: 夏休み明けも皆けっこう大人に見える)	April 11, 2011
As Katsura and Kyubei fight for the title of the best transgender person, Shinpachi leaves to find that the Shinsengumi members also suffered a sudden change in their selves; Sogo Okita is the leader from the group and orders him and Toshiro Hijikata, Sagaru Yamazaki to attack the Yorozuya. As the three leave, Hijikata knocks out Yamazaki, as he was faking his change. He and Shinpachi learn that an invasion of parasite aliens is responsible for change to their friends and proceed to destroy them. However, they find problems in the outcome, and both Hijikata and Shinpachi are knocked out in the process, with Gintoki being actually the only person without a parasite.
204	3	"Use a Calligraphy Pen for New Year's Cards"; Transliteration: "Nengajō wa Fudepen de Ike" (Japanese: 年賀状は筆ペンでいけ)	April 18, 2011
204	3	"The Heart Comes before Chocolate"; Transliteration: "Kakao Yori Kokoro" (Japanese: カカオよりココロ)	April 18, 2011
As Gintoki complains about writing News Years cards, Yorozuya learn of what his friends have done over the holidays. He also receives cards saying his friends have gotten married, while they have lied and just photoshopped the photos. The episode ends with Kondo, Sa-chan and Hasegawa telling their story of how they wrote a New Year's card. The second part starts with the same opening, but Gin complains about the lack of chocolate. Kagura has chocolate for Gintoki and Shinpachi, but is too embarrassed to give it to them. She enlists the help of Otae, Sa-chan and Tsukuyo to help, but they are each too embarrassed to help her and make her give their chocolates to Gintoki. She indifferently gives Gintoki and Shipachi the chocolate saying they were on the door step, as they happily run for the chocolate, they find all the chocolates were said to be from Kagura.
205	4	"Meals Should Be Balanced"; Transliteration: "Shokuji wa Baransu o Kangaero" (Japanese: 食事はバランスを考えろ)	April 25, 2011
205	4	"We Are All Warriors in the Battle against Fate"; Transliteration: "Hito wa Mina Unmei to Tatakau Senshi" (Japanese: 人は皆運命と戦う戦士)	April 25, 2011
Yamazaki is staking out a woman for his mission. As such, he vowed to eat nothing but Anpan until the end of said mission. Eventually, he grows sick of the thought of anpan— which was mostly caused by the slow progress with his stakeout. For nearly a month, he had no progress and was delirious from starvation and of anpan— on the 30th day, the woman noticed Yamazaki on his mission and gave him a bowl of meat and potatoes, which turned out to be laced as he was hospitalized for three days. However, Yamazaki succeeded in his mission of apprehending the woman and her brother, who turned out to be Anti-Foreigner defectors. ———————————————————————————————————————————— Kondo manages to score a date with Otae to a baseball game. However, on the day of, a typhoon struck and Kondo suffered a series of misfortunes— beginning by losing his game tickets and being tricked by the neighborhood kids that they had them but turned out to be for a different event. Soon after, Kondo found his tickets via a girl but was moved by her story of her missing father and her depressed brother. Later, the father was found alive and Kondo gave the family his tickets. However, Hijikata notifies the Chief about a meteorite, about the size of a baseball, striking Otae's position at the stadium— upon hearing that, Kondo races to the stadium to intercept the meteorite. He tried to heroically strike it out of the stadium like a baseball but the stifled momentum of the meteorite ended up hitting Otae, thus suffering her "wrath."
206	5	"It's Too Confusing When Talking about the Poster Girl for a Poster Store, So Call Her a Sandwich Board"; Transliteration: "Kanban'ya no Kanbanmusume wa Mou Mendou Nande Nimai no Ita to Yobe" (Japanese: 看板屋の看板娘はもう面倒なんで二枚の板と呼べ)	May 2, 2011
Catherine appears to have a boyfriend and has drastically improved her appearance. Her boyfriend is a regular at Snack Otose, an entrepreneur by the name of Suejiro. Catherine decides to leave the Kabuki district to start a new bar with him.
207	6	"Glasses Are Part of the Soul"; Transliteration: "Megane wa Tamashii no Ichibu Desu" (Japanese: メガネは魂の一部です)	May 9, 2011
The Odd Jobs' TV breaks with Sa-chan inside. Gintoki tells Sadaharu to throw her away with the TV, but Sa-chan's precious glasses are broken in the process. Gintoki reluctantly buys Sa-chan a new pair of glasses, but they are bottle bottom glasses that are clearly the wrong prescription. Sa-chan is overjoyed that Gintoki has given her a present, but the new glasses are responsible for a chain of failures on her assassination job. Her superiors now question her commitment.
208	7	"Glasses Prevent You from Seeing Certain Things"; Transliteration: "Megane ja Mienai Mono ga Aru" (Japanese: メガネじゃ見えないものがある)	May 16, 2011
Gintoki and crew continue to defend Sa-chan against the Lethal Punishers. But against such assassins as the Pillow Masa, T-shirt Tatsu, and the Chuubert Chu Brothers, will they win?
209	8	"Nothing Lasts Forever, including Parents, Money, Youth, Your Room, Dress Shirts, Me, You, and the Gintama Anime"; Transliteration: "Itsumade mo Aru to Omouna Oya to Kane to Heya to Y-shatsu to Watashi to Anata to Anime Gintama" (Japanese: いつまでもあると思うな親と金と若さと部屋とYシャツと私とあなたとアニメ銀魂)	May 23, 2011
Due to a lack of budget, the Yorozuya try to use old footage to make a filler episode. While Hasegawa first plays a theme song, the characters then watch a fake trailer of a supposed second film based on the series. The episode ends with a chapter of "Teach us Ginpachi-sensei", a story in which Gintoki is the teacher of a high school class composed of anime's characters.
210	9	"A Lawless Town Tends to Attract a Bunch of Whoohooey Folk"; Transliteration: "Muhō no Machi ni Tsudou wa Kyahhō na Yatsu Bakari" (Japanese: 無法の街に集うはキャッホーな奴ばかり)	May 30, 2011
Pirako Chin is looking for the strongest man in the Kabuki District. Now Gintoki has an underling who wants to turn Kabuki District into a garden of bright red flowers.
211	10	"Ghosts Aren't the Only Ones Who Run Wild Around Graveyards"; Transliteration: "Hakaba de Abareru no wa Yūrei dake de wa nai" (Japanese: 墓場で暴れるのは幽霊だけではない)	June 6, 2011
Pirako's real plan is to help Jirocho, her father, take over the town.
212	11	"Chains of a Warrior"; Transliteration: "Otoko no Kusari" (Japanese: 侠の鎖)	June 13, 2011
Pirako is pleased to hear that Otose, the reason for Jirocho's attachment to the Kabuki district, has been eliminated. With Otose gone, the balance of power among the Four Devas has crumbled and a war is in the works in the Kabuki district. Meanwhile, the Odd Jobs crew is watching over Otose when Saigo appears and informs them that the bar will be destroyed by the Four Devas. He urges them to leave this town, now that they've lost their home. Finally, the day comes for them to leave Snack Otose.
213	12	"Iron Town"; Transliteration: "Tetsu no Machi" (Japanese: 鉄の街)	June 20, 2011
Tama, Tatsumi, Tetsuko, Kozen, Madao, Kyoshiro. Everybody is out in full force to fight for the Kabuki District. Male escorts vs. drag queens, Cabaret girls vs. Yakuza, robots blowing things up. It's an all-out war!
214	13	"'Tis an Honor!"; Transliteration: "Ohikae nasutte!" (Japanese: お控えなすって!)	June 27, 2011
Jirocho and Gin battle Kada's elite Harusame forces while the rest of the denizens of Kabuki-cho take on her main forces in the streets. Kada is utterly stunned when her elite forces are beat by just these two humans, and flees the scene. Gin then helps Jirocho resolve his issues regarding Tatsugoro; Otose and Jirocho reconcile at the hospital. Outside the hospital, Kada desperately launches one last feeble attempt at conquering Kabuki-cho, but is stopped in her tracks by Pirako and the Yorozuya – Kada swears that the Harusame will be back, and flees yet again. At the very end, Jirocho denounces all other names he has ever been called except for Father of Pirako, and goes back to the country with his daughter.
215	14	"Odds or Evens"; Transliteration: "Chō ka Han ka" (Japanese: 丁か半か)	July 4, 2011
Kagura's older brother, Kamui, visits Kada's cell where she is being kept after having been captured by the Kiheitai and loses at a game of odds or evens. He is approached by one of the 12 captains who tells him he has the 12 captains support if he chooses to overthrow Admiral Abo. Kamui orders his second to kill the members of the Kiheitai, isolating Takasugi so Kamui can duel him. As the Kiheitai's ship is about to be attacked the Admiral double crosses Kamui and imprisons him out of fear. Takasugi visits Kada's cell and loses at a game of odds or evens. After a brief conversation Takasugi rescues Kamui at his execution, overthrowing Admiral Abo. Kamui becomes Admiral and the episode ends with Takasugi visiting Kada's cell one last time to lose at a game of odds or evens.
216	15	"I Can't Remember a Damn Thing About the Factory Tour"; Transliteration: "Kōjō Kengaku toka Shōjiki Hitotsu taritomo Kioku ni Nokotte nee" (Japanese: 工場見学とか正直一つたりとも記憶に残ってねェ)	July 11, 2011
Kagura invites a bunch of kids to the Yorozuya. They, along with other characters get shunned by them and invite them to a "factory tour".
217	16	"What Happens Twice Can Happen Thrice"; Transliteration: "Nido aru Koto wa Sando aru" (Japanese: 二度ある事は三度ある)	July 18, 2011
Gintoki and Hasegawa have to help the shogun when he is at the pool.
218	17	"The Claws of a Crab Can Snip Through a Friendship"; Transliteration: "Kani no Hasami wa Kizuna o Tatsu Hasami" (Japanese: カニのハサミは絆を断つハサミ)	July 25, 2011
Otose sent a box of crab to the Yoruzuya. Before they can divide the crab's legs among themselves, suddenly, there is a blackout. After the electricity is back, one leg is missing and Gintoki ate it. Another blackout occurs and another leg is missing and Kagura ate it, saying she was attacked by a gorilla. Shinpachi then puts up a candle. Then Gintoki and Kagura eat all of the legs. When Shinpachi claims the crab's whole body they found themselves fighting for a crab congee and end up eating crab-flavored cheap food.
219	18	"People Forget to Return Stuff All the Time Without Even Realizing It"; Transliteration: "Hito wa Shiranai Uchi ni Karipaku to iu Tsumi o Okashite iru" (Japanese: 人はしらないうちに借りパクという罪を犯している)	August 1, 2011
219	18	"We Ended Kind of Early So We're Gonna Start the Next Episode (Take Two)"; Transliteration: "Dainikai Nanka Hayaku Owatchatta node Jikai no Hanashi o Hajimechaou" (Japanese: 第2回 なんか早く終わっちゃったので次回の話をはじめちゃおう)	August 1, 2011
Kagura helps an iwamatsu, the last part have the yoruzuya and shinsengumi in the bathhouse just as neighbor Hedero arrives with family members visiting Edo.
220	19	"The Bathhouse, Where You're Naked in Body and Soul"; Transliteration: "Sentō de wa Mi mo Kokoro mo Maruhadaka" (Japanese: 銭湯では身も心も丸裸)	August 8, 2011
Gintoki, Kondo, Hijkata, Okita, and Shinpachi are stuck in the public bath with the demons. Every lie they tell digs their grave deeper. Can they really get away with kicking heads in, ripping off horns, and setting demons on fire with lotion?
221	20	"Jugem"; Transliteration: "Jugemu" (Japanese: 寿限無)	August 15, 2011
The Shogun's family entrusts the Yagyu dojo, and by extension, Kyubei, to take care of a pet monkey. However, the monkey doesn't have a name but has a nasty habit of pelting its poop -- as such, Kyubei, the Yorozuya, and Otae all brainstorm names, and came up with an excessively long name that can be shortened to "Jugem Jugem." Later, despite expressing his jealousy that Jugem Jugem has Kyubei's attention, Tojo lets the Yorozuya know that the Shogun has requested for the pet to be returned, to which she overheard and has agreed to do so, despite both she and Jugem Jugem having grown attached to each other. And so, the day of their departure comes, and Kyubei sadly bids goodbye to Jugem Jugem.
222	21	"The Name Reveals the Person"; Transliteration: "Na wa Tai o Arawasu" (Japanese: 名は体を表す)	August 22, 2011
Having been accustomed to Kyubei, Jugem Jugem runs away to search for her. The next morning, the Yagyu dojo dispatches some people to look for the monkey, but finds no luck. Three days later, Tojo begs the Yorozuya for help in finding Jugem Jugem. He then receives a call from the owners of Jugem Jugem -- a branch family of the Shogun's clan; they threaten Kyubei to commit seppuku should she not find it. Tojo devises a plan in setting up Gintoki as bait for Jugem Jugem, which the latter is unimpressed with. At that moment, the Yorozuya watch a news report of how Jugem Jugem freed other monkeys at the zoo, thus making the search even more difficult. Tojo attempts to use his plan, but instead lures all the escaped monkeys into pelting poop at the Yorozuya and Tojo, thus taking shelter in a phone booth. In there, Gintoki calls his friends for help in finding Jugem Jugem, but each of them struggles with the name, therefore finding no luck. Thankfully, Kyubei arrives and captures all the monkeys. Mori Mori -- Jugem Jugem's owner -- expresses his guilt in how he separated the monkey from its real friend, but Kyubei assures him that he needn't feel guilty for doing so since Jugem Jugem also tried to be Mori Mori's friend. And so, Kyubei and Mori Mori both call Jugem Jugem's name and the latter gives his monkey to its true friend, Kyubei.
223	22	"The Man's Household Situation Is Hard, His Heart Is Soft"; Transliteration: "Ossan no Katei Jijō wa Daibu Hādo Hāto wa Sofuto" (Japanese: おっさんの家庭事情は大分ハード ハートはソフト)	August 29, 2011
Katsura infiltrates Matsudaira's household and ends up pondering family values.
224	23	"Blue and Red Ecstasy"; Transliteration: "Aka to Ao no Ekusutashī" (Japanese: 青と赤のエクスタシー)	September 5, 2011
The Yorozuya run into a mysterious Blu-ray DVD with a depressed female ghost in it. The ghost moves into their TV, making all the programs gloomy as well. Gintoki then attempts to find use for the ghost as a navigator.
225	24	"So in the Second Season of Prison Break, They've Already Broken Out of Prison, But the Name Works Once You Realize That Society Is a Prison"; Transliteration: "Pu**zunbu**iku shīzun 2 tte tashikani mō puri*** bure*ku shi terukedo are wa kono kusatta shakai ga purizun tte kotodakara pu**zunbu**ikude iinda yo" (Japanese: プ○ズンブ×イクシーズン2って確かにもうプリ××ブレ○クしてるけどあれはこの腐った社会がプリズンってことだからプ○ズンブ×イクでいいんだよ)	September 12, 2011
Gintoki gets thrown in prison after being framed, and while he's made an enemy of the warden, he's managed to become the boss of the prisoners. With his underling Shachi in tow, Gintoki skips his menial labor duties to search the warden's room for anything incriminating. Understanding that the punishment will be fatal if they are caught, Gintoki disguises himself by putting on pajamas.
226	25	"Everybody Loves Pajamas"; Transliteration: "Hito wa Mina Pajamakko" (Japanese: 人は皆パジャマっ子)	September 19, 2011
Gintoki continues creating havoc in the prison.
227	26	"Speaking of Crossovers, Don't Forget About Alien vs. Predator"; Transliteration: "Korabo ni wa Eiri*n vs Pu**detā ga Aru no mo Oboeteoke" (Japanese: コラボにはエイリ○ンVSプ×デターがあるのも覚えておけ)	September 26, 2011
Gintama meets Sket Dance! But not without trouble.
228	27	"Love Is Neither Plus Nor Minus"; Transliteration: "Ai ni Purasu mo Mainasu mo Nashi" (Japanese: 愛にプラスもマイナスもなし)	October 3, 2011
Shinpachi introduces his new girlfriend to Otae but she turns out to be Momo-san, a character from the popular Love Chorus game. There are more and more boys in Edo who can no longer distinguish game from reality like Shinpachi. Otae asks Gintoki to bring Shinpachi back to the real world. The only way is by entering the world of Love Chorus and talking some sense into him. Gintoki ends up choosing a unique heroine to be his girlfriend.
229	28	"Making It Through Love"; Transliteration: "Wataru Seken wa Ai bakari" (Japanese: 渡る世間は愛ばかり)	October 10, 2011
Gintoki challenges Shinpachi in the ultimate Love Chorus tournament in order to break his illusion of his virtual girlfriend.
230	29	"It Would Take Too Much Effort to Make This Title Sound Like a Text Message Subject"; Transliteration: "Koko no Taitoru mo Mēru no Taitoru mitaina Toko mo Kangaeru no Mendokusa" (Japanese: ここのタイトルもメールのタイトルみたいなトコも考えるのメンド臭)	October 17, 2011
Kagura wants a mobile phone of her own in order to be able to text with her friends. Her wish is granted, and she starts harassing Gintoki and Shinpachi through text messaging.
231	30	"When You Go to a Funeral for the First Time, You're Surprised By How Happy the People Are"; Transliteration: "Sōshiki tte Hajimete Iku to Igai to Minna Akarukute Bikkuri suru" (Japanese: 葬式って初めていくと意外とみんな明るくてビックリする)	October 24, 2011
The Shinsengumi and the Yorozuya attend the funeral of a close udon shop owner. Instead of moving on, however, the soul of the old man is overseeing the ceremony.
232	31	"The People You Tend to Forget Tend to Show Up After You Forget Them"; Transliteration: "Wasureppoi Yatsu wa Wasureta Koro ni Yattekuru" (Japanese: 忘れっぽい奴は忘れた頃にやってくる)	October 31, 2011
Katsura visits the Yorozuya with Elizabeth's placard to solve the mystery of Elizabeth's disappearance. But the investigation only reveals a shocking truth.
233	32	"Space Ururun Homestay"; Transliteration: "Uchū Bururun Taizaiki" (Japanese: 宇宙ブルルン滞在記)	November 7, 2011
The Yorozuya and Katsura follow Elizabeth to stop the Renho from taking over the earth.
234	33	"Piggy Banks and Trash Cans"; Transliteration: "Senryōbako to Garakuta no Hako" (Japanese: 千両箱とガラクタの箱)	November 14, 2011
The Yorozuya, Katsura, and Sakamoto disguise themselves as Renho and infiltrate their base.
235	34	"Empty Planet"; Transliteration: "Kara no Hoshi" (Japanese: 空の星)	November 21, 2011
Elizabeth and Dark Vader battle to the death and just when things are not looking so good for Elizabeth, Katsura shows up to save his friend.
236	35	"Don't Say Goodbye Lionel"; Transliteration: "Sayonara-ioneru nanka iwasenai" (Japanese: さよなライオネルなんか言わせない)	November 28, 2011
The Renho join forces with Sakamoto and the Yorozuya against Dark Vader and their home planet in order to bring peace to the universe.
237	36	"Please Take Me Skiing"; Transliteration: "Sessha o Sukī ni Tsuretette" (Japanese: 拙者をスキーにつれてって)	December 5, 2011
The Shinsengumi are forced to guard the Shogun on his first snowboarding trip, but they run into the Yorozuya and mayhem ensues.
238	37	"A Vacation in Disorientation"; Transliteration: "Ian Ryokō wa Iyan Dokō?" (Japanese: 慰安旅行はイヤンどこォ?)	December 12, 2011
Everybody's stranded in the middle of the mountains. To make things worse, the Shogun goes missing.
239	38	"You Know Those Year-End Parties Where You Keep Drinking until You've Forgotten Everything That Happened the Past Year? There Are a Few Things You're Not Supposed to Forget"; Transliteration: "Bōnenkai demo Wasurecha Ikenai Mono ga Aru" (Japanese: 忘年会でも忘れちゃいけないものがある)	December 19, 2011
It's a year-end party at Odd Jobs! The Gintama anime has been through a lot, but Gintoki tells Kagura and Shinpachi to keep it cool. And then the usual members join in for some real partying. The next morning, Gintoki wakes up to discover that he's made some very bad mistakes. Will he be able to survive the worst blunder in five years of Gintama!?
240	39	"People Can Only Live By Forgetting the Bad"; Transliteration: "Hito wa Wasureru Koto de Ikite Ikeru" (Japanese: 人は忘れることで生きていける)	December 26, 2011
After getting drunk at the year-end party, Gintoki managed to become a six-timer in one night. In order to prevent the show from being pulled off the air, Gintoki is forced into engaging in a relationship with all of them. And now he has to go on dates with all of them at the same time...!
241	40	"We Are All Hosts, in Capital Letters"; Transliteration: "Arufabetto Hyōki de Jinrui Mina Hosuto" (Japanese: アルファベット表記で人類みなホスト)	January 9, 2012
The number one host in the Kabuki district, Kyoshiro, summons the Odd Jobs members to his club, Takamagahara, and tells them that he intends to quit because of a lady named Madame Yagami who controls the night world. It seems that she declared she would be making a second visit to Takamagahara, which is essentially a death sentence. The hosts at Kyoshiro's have quit out of fear, so Gintoki and co must find hosts to handle the Madame.
242	41	"Girls Like Vegeta, Guys Like Piccolo"; Transliteration: "Onna wa Bejīta-zuki Otoko wa Pikkoro-zuki" (Japanese: 女はベジータ好き 男はピッコロ好き)	January 16, 2012
The Madame's arrival is imminent. Kyoshiro, Gintoki and friends attempt to scout some help, but they end up with a bunch of oddballs. And it turns out that Otae has invited guests from all over town who go wild and leave the bar and Kyoshiro wrecked! There's no time to worry about taking care of customers. But at the worst possible time, Madame Yagami arrives!
243	42	"Draw Your Life on the Canvas We Call Manga"; Transliteration: "Manga toiu Kyanbasu ni Jinsei toiu Fude de E o Kake" (Japanese: 漫画という画布に人生という筆で絵を描け)	January 23, 2012
Jellybeans Vanguard Honda is on his fifth year as a Jump editor. However, he's been assigned to the manga Gintaman, which has driven multiple editors insane. In order to save himself, Honda must find a new talented artist so he can be reassigned. One day, he is visited by an aspiring manga artist by the name of N3016. Is this artist as juvenile as his name suggests?
244	43	"Check It Out!!"; Transliteration: "Chekera!!" (Japanese: チェケラ!!)	January 30, 2012
The Sasaki family is as elite as it gets, and one of its members, Tetsunosuke, has joined the Shinsengumi. He would have joined the Mimawarigumi, a police force with pedigree, but he is considered a troublemaker, which is why he was sent to the Shinsengumi. Kondo assigns Tetsu to Hijikata as an assistant, so Hijikata is forced to endure the new recruit.
245	44	"Thorny and Rosy"; Transliteration: "Ibara-gaki to Bara-gaki" (Japanese: 茨ガキと薔薇ガキ)	February 6, 2012
Tetsunosuke has completely changed as he sincerely tries to perform his new job. Isaburo despises Tetsunosuke and tells Hijikata that he should dispose of him, but Hijikata, who came from a similar background, sympathizes with Tetsunosuke and looks after him. Meanwhile, Gintoki, who was arrested by the Mimawarigumi, has been assigned a mission by Isaburo.
246	45	"Festival of Thornies"; Transliteration: "Warugaki domo no Saiten" (Japanese: 悪ガキどもの祭典)	February 13, 2012
Tetsunosuke has been ordered to deliver a letter for Hijikata. However, he's captured by the radical Joi Check It Out gang in the process. Tetsunosuke had concealed his identity to join the gang, but now they know that he has connections to the police. He's taken hostage as leverage over the Shinsengumi and Mimawarigumi. However, the Mimawarigumi show no concern for the hostage and plot to place the blame squarely on the Shinsengumi. Hijikata and the other members are enraged after learning Isaburo's plans. The Shinsengumi and Mimawarigumi are now in an all-out fight.
247	46	"Letter from Thorny"; Transliteration: "Baragaki kara no Tegami" (Japanese: バラガキからの手紙)	February 20, 2012
The Shinsengumi attempt to save Tetsunosuke from the Check It Out gang, but the Mimawarigumi stand in the way. Neither side is willing to back down, but Gintoki, who had infiltrated the gang as a Mimawarigumi spy, manages to save Tetsunosuke! Kondo orders the Shinsengumi to begin fighting back!
248	47	"Madaodog Madaonaire"; Transliteration: "Madaodoggu Madaonea" (Japanese: マダオドッグマダオネア)	February 27, 2012
The middle-aged dumb-ass oldie, or Madao, Taizo Hasegawa finds himself on a game show with a chance to win ten million yen. Will he be able to endure the pressure and become a Madaonaire!? And what is Madao's motivation for participating in the game show?
249	48	"Presents Are Meant to Be Given Early"; Transliteration: "Okurimono wa Ohayame ni" (Japanese: 贈り物はお早めに)	March 5, 2012
A character from 2 years ago is back with a request for Gin. This favor will take the Odd-Job Trio right in the middle of Satan Festival in this very special Christmas episode.
250	49	"New Year's Envelopes Are Perfect for Dirty Jokes"; Transliteration: "Otoshidama wa ****neta tono Aishō ga Batsugun" (Japanese: お年玉は×ネタとの相性がバツグン)	March 12, 2012
Gin is trying to hand out New Year Envelopes but the lack of children characters make it hard. To make matters worse, everyone seems to have their mind wrapped around long cylindrical objects and small spherical objects.
251	50	"When Sleeping Under a Kotatsu, Make Sure You Don't Burn Your Balls"; Transliteration: "Kotatsu de neru Toki wa ***tama Nesshinai you Ki o Tsukero" (Japanese: コタツで寝るときは○玉熱しないよう気をつけろ)	March 19, 2012
Nobody cares anymore, the animators, producers, not even Hideaki Sorachi. It's such a drag, even the characters are airing their grievances. Where do we go from here?
252	51	"We're Sorry"; Transliteration: "Gomennasai" (Japanese: ごめんなさい)	March 26, 2012
It's the last episode and Gintama' is going out with a bang. A Gintama clip show!
