= Gintama season 2 =

Gintama
- Season 2
- First DVD for Gintama season 2
- No. of episodes: 50

Release
- Original network: TV Tokyo
- Original release: April 5, 2007 – March 27, 2008

Season chronology
- ← Previous; Season 1 Next → Season 3

The second season of the Japanese anime television series Gintama are directed by Shinji Takamatsu and animated by Sunrise. They aired in TV Tokyo from April 5, 2007, until March 27, 2008, with a total of 50 episodes which are episodes 50–99 from the main series. The anime is based on Hideaki Sorachi's manga of the same name. The story revolves around an eccentric samurai, Gintoki Sakata, his apprentice, Shinpachi Shimura, and a teenage alien girl named Kagura. All three are "free-lancers" who search for work in order to pay the monthly rent, which usually goes unpaid anyway.

In Japan, Aniplex distributes the anime in DVD format. The second season was released over thirteen volumes between July 25, 2007, and July 23, 2008.

On January 8, 2009, the streaming video site Crunchyroll began offering English subtitled episodes of the series. The episodes are available on Crunchyroll within hours of airing in Japan to paying members. The episodes can also be watched for free a week after release. The first available episode was episode 139. On the same day, Crunchyroll also began uploading episodes from the beginning of the series at a rate of two a week.

Six musical themes are used for this season: two openings themes and four ending themes. Episodes 50–75 use "Gin'iro no Sora" (銀色の空; lit. 'Silver Sky') by redballoon. The following episodes replace it with "Kasanaru Kage" (かさなる影; lit. 'Overlapping Shadow') by Hearts Grow. The first ending theme is "Shura" (修羅; lit. 'Carnage') by Does. Since episode 63 it is replaced with "Kiseki" (奇跡; lit. 'Miracle') by Snowkel. It is used until episode 75, while since episode 76 the ending is "Signal" by Kelun. The fourth ending used since episode 88 is "Speed of flow" by The Rodeo Carburettor. Episodes 61, 62, 97 and 99 exchange the use of the themes; this leaves episode 61 and 62 with "Shura" as the opening and with "Gin'iro Sora" as the ending while "Speed of flow" and "Kasanaru Kage" are opening and ending themes, respectively, in episodes 97 and 99. Episode 96 does not use an opening theme, while "Kasanaru Kage" is used as an ending theme.

== Episodes ==
| No. overall | No. in season | Title | Original release date |
|---|---|---|---|
| 50 | 1 | "Pending Means Pending, It's Not Final"; Transliteration: "Mitei wa Mitei de atte Kettei dewanai" (Japanese: 未定は未定であって決定ではない) | April 5, 2007 |
Thinking that the anime could get cancelled after the first year not doing as well as they had expected, the cast argues over a new premise for the series.
| 51 | 2 | "Milk Should Be Served At Body Temperature"; Transliteration: "Miruku wa hitohada no ondo de" (Japanese: ミルクは人肌の温度で) | April 12, 2007 |
Gintoki discovers a baby dropped off at the Yorozuya, making everyone think he's the father and getting entangled in returning him to his real mother.
| 52 | 3 | "If You Want To See Someone, Make An Appo First"; Transliteration: "Hito ni au toki wa mazu apo o" (Japanese: 人に会うときはまずアポを) | April 19, 2007 |
Not knowing of the full story regarding the baby as well as Shinpachi and Kagura's infiltration and a blind assassin after him, Gintoki heads forth to return the infant to his mother.
| 53 | 4 | "Stress Makes You Bald, But It's Stressful To Avoid Stress, So You End Up Stressed Out Anyway, So In The End There's Nothing You Can Do"; Transliteration: "Sutoresu wa hageru gen'in ni naru ga sutoresu o tamenai yōni ki o kubaruto sokode mata sutoresu ga tamarunode kekkyoku bokurani dekiru koto nante nanimo nai" (Japanese: ストレスはハゲる原因になるがストレスをためないように気を配るとそこでまたストレスがたまるので結局僕らにできることなんて何もない) | April 26, 2007 |
While trying to burn old JUMP issues, Gintoki is captured by a female fire fighter in search of a local arsonist.
| 54 | 5 | "Mothers Everywhere Are All The Same"; Transliteration: "Doko no kāchan mo daitai onaji" (Japanese: どこの母ちゃんもだいたい同じ) | May 3, 2007 |
A mother from the country "adopts" the Yorozuya so they can help her find her missing son.
| 55 | 6 | "Don't Make Munching Noises When You Eat"; Transliteration: "Mono taberu toki kucha kucha oto o tatenai" (Japanese: もの食べるときクチャクチャ音をたてない) | May 10, 2007 |
Discovering that Hachiro, the missing son they were looking for, is the top male-escort in Kabuki-cho, Gintoki assists both in reuniting him with his mother and facing gangsters hoping to use them for their own purposes.
| 56 | 7 | "Keep An Eye On The Chief For The Day"; Transliteration: "Ichinichi kyokuchō ni ki o tsukero-ttenmaiyā-san" (Japanese: 一日局長に気をつけろッテンマイヤーさん) | May 17, 2007 |
With the Shinsengumi's reputation plummeting, pop idol Otsuu is brought in to improve their reputation, only making matters worse both in suggestions and in her capture.
| 57 | 8 | "When Looking For Things You've Lost, Remember What You Were Doing On The Day You Lost It"; Transliteration: "Nakushita mono o sagasu toki wa sono hi no kōdō o sakanobore" (Japanese: 無くした物を探すときはその日の行動をさかのぼれ) | May 24, 2007 |
Mutsu requests the Yorozuya to recover some stolen cargo.
| 58 | 9 | "Croquette Sandwiches Are Always The Most Popular Food Sold At The Stalls"; Transliteration: "Baiten de wa yappari korokke pan ga ichiban ninki" (Japanese: 売店ではやっぱりコロッケパンが一番人気) | May 31, 2007 |
Katsura is attacked by a mysterious tsujigiri serial killer, leading Elizabeth to recruit the Yorozuya to find out the culprit; at the same time, Gintoki is recruited by two swordsmiths to find a stolen sword: the mysterious "Benizakura".
| 59 | 10 | "Be Careful Not To Leave Your Umbrella Somewhere"; Transliteration: "Kasa no okiwasure ni chūi" (Japanese: 傘の置き忘れに注意) | June 7, 2007 |
As Gintoki faces the aftermath of his encounter with a resurgent Nizō and the Benizakura, Kagura becomes entangled within the web of Takasugi and the Kiheitai while Shinpachi assists Elizabeth in connecting the two.
| 60 | 11 | "The Sun Will Rise Again"; Transliteration: "Hi wa mata noboru" (Japanese: 陽はまた昇る) | June 14, 2007 |
Shinpachi and Elizabeth attempt to stop the Kiheitai and save Kagura as Gintoki reemerges to take care of Nizō as he falls further and further into Benizakura's control.
| 61 | 12 | "On A Moonless Night, Insects Are Drawn To The Light"; Transliteration: "Yamiyo no mushi wa hikari ni tsudou" (Japanese: 闇夜の虫は光に集う) | June 21, 2007 |
Gintoki has his final showdown with Nizō and the Benizakura, while a familiar friend reappears to try and deal with Takasugi.
| 62 | 13 | "Even Mummy Hunters Sometimes Turn Into Mummys"; Transliteration: "Miira tori ga miira ni" (Japanese: ミイラ捕りがミイラに) | June 28, 2007 |
After the events involving the Benizakura, Yamazaki is sent to spy on the Yorozuya to determine his connection with the extremists in Oedo.
| 63 | 14 | "The Preview Section In JUMP Is Always Unreliable"; Transliteration: "Janpu no jigō yokoku wa ateni naranai" (Japanese: ジャンプの次号予告は当てにならない) | July 5, 2007 |
Zenzou encounters a JUMP reading girl who holds the ability to see the future.
| 64 | 15 | "Eating Nmaibo Can Make You Full In No Time!"; Transliteration: "Nmaibō wa igai to onaka ippai ni naru" (Japanese: んまい棒は意外とお腹いっぱいになる) | July 12, 2007 |
Oedo News spends the day with Katsura as he goes about his usual antics, from fleeing the Shinsengumi to trying to get back on good terms with Gintoki.
| 65 | 16 | "Rhinoceros Beetles Teach Boys That Life Is Precious"; Transliteration: "Shōnen wa kabutomushi o tōshi seimei no tōtosa o shiru" (Japanese: 少年はカブト虫を通し生命の尊さを知る) | July 19, 2007 |
Kagura forces the Yorozuya to go beetle hunting for fun and profit, but they discover the Shinsengumi, in search of a beetle for their own purposes.
| 66 | 17 | "Dango Over Flowers"; Transliteration: "Hana yori dango" (Japanese: 華より団子) | July 26, 2007 |
When an intergalactic pastry shop threatens to put Gintoki's favorite dango shop out of business, the Yorozuya rise to the challenge in helping them win a contest to keep it open (and keep themselves fed for several days).
| 67 | 18 | "For The Wind Is The Life"; Transliteration: "Hashiri tsuzukete koso jinsei" (Japanese: 走り続けてこそ人生) | August 2, 2007 |
| 67 | 18 | "The Ideal Girlfriend Is Always Minami"; Transliteration: "Risō no kanojo wa yappari Minami-chan" (Japanese: 理想の彼女はやっぱり南ちゃん) | August 2, 2007 |
Gintoki gets entangled with an Amanto delivery girl who is obsessed with speed and constant movement and is forced to do deliveries with her. As Gintoki recovers from the delivery incident, Sa-chan is forced to weigh both her feminine needs and her assassin duties when working a mission at the same hospital.
| 68 | 19 | "Like A Haunted House, Life Is Filled With Horrors"; Transliteration: "Wataru seken wa obake bakari" (Japanese: 渡る世間はオバケばかり) | August 9, 2007 |
The Yorozuya are forced into working at a haunted attraction at the local Matsuri festival (which they promised to do) with a man who takes the purpose of the attraction too seriously.
| 69 | 20 | "Please Help By Separating Your Trash"; Transliteration: "Gomi no bunbetsu kaishū ni gokyōryoku kudasai" (Japanese: ゴミの分別回収にご協力下さい) | August 16, 2007 |
After checking on his trash after being scared by a TV Commercial, Gintoki finds an Android's head in the trash. Kagura brings the head back to the Yorozuya to use as an "egg cracker". After discovering that it is an Android's head, Gintoki takes the head to Gengai the mechanic, who repairs it. After activating the head, a news report is shown on the TV announcing the murder of the Robotics expert, Professor Hayashi, and the prime suspect is his former robot secretary, Fuzou-0. Fuzou-0's head resembles the head on the news, but when asked, the android claims to have lost her memory and is given the name "Tama" by Kagura. Three strangers, two of whom are robots arrive to take the head, and the Yorozuya trio escape with Tama. During a break in the ensuing chase, Fuzuo-0 begins to cry, and an army of robot maids arrive.
| 70 | 21 | "Too Many Cuties Can Make You Sick"; Transliteration: "Kawaii mono mo ōsugiru to kimochi warui" (Japanese: 可愛いモノも多すぎると気持ち悪い) | August 23, 2007 |
Shinpachi escapes with Fuzuo-0, but is captured by the army of robot maids. After Gintoki and Kagura escape from the maids on Sadaharu, they head for Gengai's place. There they discover that Professor Hayashi had copied the personality of his dead daughter into Fuzuo-0, and the truth about Hayashi's death. Hayashi had transferred his personality to the android "502", however the personality has degraded and 502 wishes for robots to rise above Humans. Shinpachi was able to separate Fuzuo-0's memory just before he was captured by the maids, and leaves it for Gengai to find. Gengai implants Fuzuo-0's memory and personality into another robot. As an army of robotic maids arrive at Gengai's, there is an explosion and Gintoki, Kagura and Gengai emerge and head for the terminal on a tank.
| 71 | 22 | "Some Data Cannot Be Erased"; Transliteration: "Kesenai dēta mo aru" (Japanese: 消せないデータもある) | August 30, 2007 |
While driving across Edo in the tank, they are intercepted by a giant robot maid, who causes them to fall. The gang jumps onto Sadaharu to continue their journey, but Gengai falls into a chasm. After defeating the maid, Kagura and Sadaharu also fall into the chasm. Gintoki and Fuzuo-0 (who is now exhibiting emotions) confront 502, only for Fuzuo-0 to defend 502 from an attack by Shinpachi. However, this was a trick by Fuzuo-0, who restrains 502 as Kagura, Sadaharu and Gengai arrive as back-up. Gintoki defeats 502 with the help of Kagura, Shinpachi and Fuzuo-0. As the terminal begins to become damaged by an energy overload, Fuzuo-0 sacrifices herself to fix the problem as the others escape. After the commotion dies down, Gengai implants Fuyou-0's original personality without memories into her previous head, and she is placed in Otose's bar as a new employee.
| 72 | 23 | "A Dog's Paws Smell Fragrant"; Transliteration: "Inu no nikukyū wa kōbashii nioi ga suru" (Japanese: 犬の肉球はこうばしい匂いがする) | September 6, 2007 |
| 72 | 23 | "Drive With A "Might" Attitude"; Transliteration: "Kamoshirenai unten de ike" (Japanese: かもしれない運転で行け) | September 6, 2007 |
Sadaharu isn't feeling well, and eventually everyone realizes he is in "heat". In order to find Sadaharu a mate, they travel to a local park used by other dog owners. After being turned down several times, a dog named Meru which belongs to a local Yakuza gang boss, gains the attention of Sadaharu. The Yakuza members give chase after Sadaharu and the others, eventually heading onto a lake. After a while, the chase is interrupted by several boats colliding on the lake, and Sadaharu pulls everyone onto the bank of the lake. After Katsura breaks up a Joui meeting after the other members keep talking about the drama "Summer Sonata", he tries to rent the first DVD, but is asked to provide a drivers license as proof of identity. To obtain a license, Katsura joins a driving school, and winds up in a co-learning session with Gintoki. During the lesson, Katsura has several daydreams inventing ridiculous situations, such as believing a bomb has been planted under the car, and that a man is trying to kill himself on a railway track. Katsura manages to watch "Summer Sonata", but at the next Joui meeting, the members are talking about another drama. In an attempt to gain a rental membership, Katsura pulls out his "wanted" poster as a proof of identity.
| 73 | 24 | "Think For A Minute Now, Do Matsutake Mushrooms Really Taste All That Good?"; Transliteration: "Sonna ni matsutakette oishii mon nanoka ichido yoku kangaete miyō" (Japanese: そんなに松茸って美味しいもんなのか一度良く考えてみよう) | September 13, 2007 |
While hunting mushrooms in the woods, the Yorozuya become infected with mentality-changing mushrooms while getting involved in a tragic war between a bear and a hunter. When Catherine and Otose try to collect the rent, Gintoki, Shinpachi and Kagura escape to go looking for Matsutake Mushrooms in a forest. While Gintoki and Shinpachi are discussing a strange mushroom they have found, Kagura arrives carrying a wounded bear that has a mushroom growing on its head. As Gintoki and Kagura walk off, a giant bear arrives, and they play dead. A hunter named Marinosuke arrives and attacks the bear, allowing them to escape. Marinosuke explains that the bear, named Masamune, is being affected by a parasitic mushroom from an alien planet. While having lunch, the four of them realize they have been infected by the mushrooms after Kagura cooks one in the pot. After Marinosuke is rescued from the bear, he tells the others his story and admits the bear is his own sin, and that he must kill the bear to correct it. Marinosuke defeats Masamune and leaves the mountain.
| 74 | 25 | "The Manga Writer Becomes A Pro, After Doing A Stock Of Manuscripts"; Transliteration: "Mangaka wa genkō no sutokku ga dekitekoso ichininmae" (Japanese: 漫画家は原稿のストックが出来てこそ一人前) | September 20, 2007 |
Edo's under attack by M-unibrow zombies! Catherine appears with a "unibrow" eyebrow and is acting like a Zombie, she then attacks Otose. Gintoki, Kagura and Shinpachi escape to the street, but they encounter a taxi driver with the same "unibrow". An emergency announcement is broadcast warning people to stay in their homes as the number of eyebrow zombies increases. They encounter Katsura, but are surrounded by the zombies. They are saved by Hasegawa who lets them into the bathroom of a Pachinko parlour he is working at. Sa-chan arrives and explains that the problem is caused by the "Ryo-II" Virus, and that the Kabuki district is under martial law. Everyone is trapped within the pachinko parlour, but a zombie Otae breaks in. Gintoki, Kagura, Sa-chan, Shinpachi and Katsura escape into an elevator, but Hasegawa is left behind. After leaving the elevator, they meet Elizabeth, who has saved Hasegawa. However, Katsura is infected by Elizabeth as Hasegawa enters the elevator and the door closes. Hasegawa has turned into an eyebrow zombie, so Gintoki and the other survivors attack him with a razor. After escaping onto the roof, Matsudaira arrives and announces he has a vaccine for the virus, however he turns into an eyebrow zombie and the helicopter he is on crashes. The zombies burst through the door and infect everyone except Gintoki, who catches Matsudaira's vaccine and unleashes it onto the zombies.
| 75 | 26 | "Don't Complain About Your Job At Home, Do It Somewhere Else"; Transliteration: "Shigoto no guchi wa ie de kobosazu soto de kobose!" (Japanese: 仕事のグチは家でこぼさず外でこぼせ!) | September 27, 2007 |
Gintoki, Shinpachi and Kagura recap what has happened to date on their 2nd Year Anniversary special with a special appearance of Prince Hata doing a voiceover of Shinsuke Takasugi's voice.
| 76 | 27 | "In Those Situations, Keep Quiet And Cook Red Rice With Beans"; Transliteration: "Sō iu toki wa damatte sekihan" (Japanese: そういう時は黙って赤飯) | October 4, 2007 |
Otae's childhood friend, Kyubei Yagyu appears and takes Otae back to fulfill her childhood promise, which simultaneously draws heat from both Shinpachi (who wants to protect his sister) and the Shinsengumi (who want to use her to save Kondo from a beastly wedding proposal).
| 77 | 28 | "Yesterday's Enemy, After All Is Said And Done, Is Still The Enemy"; Transliteration: "Kinō no teki wa kyō mo nan'ya kan'ya de teki" (Japanese: 昨日の敵は今日もなんやかんやで敵) | October 11, 2007 |
Gintoki, Shinpachi, Kagura, Kondo, Hijikata and Sogo go to the Yagyu family premises and attempt to get Otae back.
| 78 | 29 | "People Who Are Picky About Food Are Also Picky About People, Too"; Transliteration: "Tabemono no sukikirai ga ōi hito wa ningen no sukikirai mo ōi" (Japanese: 食べ物の好き嫌いが多い人は人間の好き嫌いも多い) | October 18, 2007 |
The battle at the Yagyu family premises continues.
| 79 | 30 | "Four Heads Are Better Than One"; Transliteration: "Yonin soroeba ironna chie" (Japanese: 四人揃えばいろんな知恵) | October 25, 2007 |
Gintoki, Kondo, Toujou, and Binbokusai are in the toilet, all looking for something to wipe....
| 80 | 31 | "When Someone Who Wears Glasses Takes Them Off, It Looks Like Something's Missing"; Transliteration: "Fudan megane o kaketeru yatsu ga megane o hazusuto nanka mono tarinai, pātsu ga ikko tarinai kigasuru" (Japanese: 普段眼鏡をかけてる奴が眼鏡を外すとなんかもの足りない パーツが一個足りない気がする) | November 8, 2007 |
The battle between Gintoki and Binbokusai begins; meanwhile, Shinpachi discovers that Kyubei was born a girl.
| 81 | 32 | "A Woman's Best Make Up Is Her Smile"; Transliteration: "Onna no ichiban no keshō wa egao" (Japanese: 女の一番の化粧は笑顔) | November 15, 2007 |
The final episode in the Yagyu story arc.
| 82 | 33 | "You Don't Stand In Line For The Ramen, You Stand In Line For The Self Satisfaction"; Transliteration: "Rāmen no tameni narabun janai jikomanzoku no tame narabun da" (Japanese: ラーメンのために並ぶんじゃない自己満足のため並ぶんだ) | November 22, 2007 |
| 82 | 33 | "You Say Kawaii So Often, You Must Really Think You're Cute Stuff"; Transliteration: "Kawaii o renpatsu suru jibunjishin o kawaii to omottendaro Omaera" (Japanese: カワイイを連発する自分自身をカワイイと思ってんだろ お前ら) | November 22, 2007 |
The Yorozuya attempt to rid a town of monsters for some quick cash The piggish Amanto female saved by the Yorozuya from the drug pirates enlists them to save her boyfriend from his former gang.
| 83 | 34 | "Rank Has Nothing To Do With Luck"; Transliteration: "Un ni mibun wa kankei nai" (Japanese: 運に身分は関係ない) | November 29, 2007 |
Otae's boss hires the Yorozuya to find replacements to serve as his hostesses due to most of them being sick. Gintoki enlists Kyubei, Ayumu, Catherine, Sa-chan and Kagura only to have Ayumu and Catherine to knock themselves out, which forces him and Shinpachi to take their places. They discover the important customer to be the shōgun escorted by the Shinsengumi. Katakuriko Matsudaira suggests the shōgun and the hostesses play a game of drawing sticks where whoever draws the stick lettered with "shōgun", gets to order one of the numbers around. The game continues until the shōgun is unintentionally stripped naked and forced to go out and buy underwear. Kyubei buys the underwear and apologizes to the shōgun who replies that he had fun. When passing the bag to him, the shōgun brushes his hand on hers, causing her to throw him into the river.
| 84 | 35 | "Hard-Boiled Egg On A Man's Heart"; Transliteration: "Otoko wa kokoro ni katayude tamago" (Japanese: 男は心に固ゆで卵) | December 6, 2007 |
A washed out detective tells his tale about his life-long quest of pursuing a thief who turned from righteous to evil.
| 85 | 36 | "Hard-Boiled Eggs Don't Crack"; Transliteration: "Katayude tamago wa tsuburenai" (Japanese: 固ゆで卵は潰れない) | December 13, 2007 |
The detective, Gintoki, Shinpachi and Kagura crash into a mansion in an attempt to capture the thief.
| 86 | 37 | "It's Often Difficult To Sleep When You're Engrossed With Counting Sheep"; Transliteration: "Hitsuji kazoeru no jitaini muchū ni nattarishite kekkyoku nemurenai koto mo ōi" (Japanese: 羊数えるの自体に夢中になったりして結局眠れないことも多い) | December 20, 2007 |
Sougo's older sister, Mitsuba, arrives in Edo for a visit. Hijikata and Mitsuba's relationship is revealed.
| 87 | 38 | "Perform A German Suplex On A Woman Who Asks If She Or The Job Is More Important"; Transliteration: "Watashi to shigoto dotchiga daiji nanokato iu onna ni wa jāman sūpurekkusu" (Japanese: 私と仕事どっちが大事なのかという女にはジャーマンスープレックス) | December 27, 2007 |
Mitsuba's condition gets worse due to her sickness; Sougo decides to help Hijikata.
| 88 | 39 | "The Most Exciting Part Of A Group Date Is Before It Starts"; Transliteration: "Gōkon wa hajimaru madega ichiban tanoshii" (Japanese: 合コンは始まるまでが一番楽しい) | January 10, 2008 |
Tojo Ayumu enlists the help of the Yorozuya to help make a "woman" out of the tomboyish Kyubei. Gintoki's solution: a Gokon.
| 89 | 40 | "What Happens Twice, Happens Thrice"; Transliteration: "Nido aru koto wa sando aru." (Japanese: 2度あることは3度ある) | January 17, 2008 |
The spirit of the sword that Gintoki carries appears to teach Gintoki, Shinpachi and Kagura an ultimate technique.
| 90 | 41 | "The More Delicious The Food, The Nastier It Is When It Goes Bad"; Transliteration: "Oishii mono hodo ataru to kowai" (Japanese: 美味しいものほど当たると恐い) | January 24, 2008 |
Hasegawa and Elizabeth are hospitalized after being hit by a car driven by a mysterious man. At the same time, the Yorozuya gang are also hospitalized after eating rotten crab. They notice one of the nurses, Uchino, staring intently at Katsura who is visiting Elizabeth and plans on hospitalizing Katsura so the nurse may confess to him. Eventually, the five are attacked by the head nurse for causing a disturbance and Katsura is hospitalized. However, they discover that Uchino had feelings for Elizabeth and not Katsura. Meanwhile, two nurses run into the mysterious man in the elevator.
| 91 | 42 | "If You Want To Lose Weight, Then Stop Eating And Start Moving"; Transliteration: "Yasetai nara ugoke taberuna" (Japanese: やせたいなら動け 食べるな) | January 31, 2008 |
Our female characters join a "slimming" camp to shed off their extra weight.
| 92 | 43 | "Be A Person Who Can See People's Strong Points And Not Their Weak Points"; Transliteration: "Hito no tansho o mitsukeru yori chōsho o mitsukerareru hito ni nare." (Japanese: 人の短所を見つけるより長所を見つけられる人になれ) | February 7, 2008 |
An assassin has been hired to kill Matsudaira; but encounters unexpected scenarios while carrying out the task.
| 93 | 44 | "Even A Hero Has Issues"; Transliteration: "Hīrō datte nayan deru" (Japanese: ヒーローだって悩んでる) | February 14, 2008 |
It's Valentine's Day, and a space heroine comes to Edo to confess her intention to...
| 94 | 45 | "When Riding A Train, Make Sure You Grab The Straps With Both Hands"; Transliteration: "Densha ni noru toki wa kanarazu ryōte o tsurikawani" (Japanese: 電車に乗る時は必ず両手をつり革に) | February 21, 2008 |
Hasegawa gets a job. While commuting on his first day, an accident lands him in jail with harassment charges.
| 95 | 46 | "Men, Be A Madao"; Transliteration: "Otoko tachi yo madao de are" (Japanese: 男たちよマダオであれ) | February 28, 2008 |
Hasegawa's trial for his harassment charges comes to a conclusion.
| 96 | 47 | "If You're A Man, Don't Give Up"; Transliteration: "Otoko nara akirameru na" (Japanese: 男なら諦めるな) | March 6, 2008 |
A planet is attacked by mysterious beings. It is up to Umibozu to settle things and to put an end to the attacks.
| 97 | 48 | "Exaggerate The Tales Of Your Exploits By A Third, So Everyone Has A Good Time"; Transliteration: "Mukashi no buyūden wa sanwarimashi de hanase" (Japanese: 昔の武勇伝は三割増で話せ) | March 13, 2008 |
| 97 | 48 | "Men Have A Weakness For Girls Who Sell Flowers And Work In Pastry Shops"; Transliteration: "Hanaya toka kēki ya no musume ni otoko wa yowai" (Japanese: 花屋とかケーキ屋の娘に男は弱い) | March 13, 2008 |
Old gangmates of Catherine try to convince her to join them on a heist. Gintoki gets the flu and Kagura takes over as his replacement as the Yorozuya boss for one day.
| 98 | 49 | "Play Video Games For Only An Hour A Day"; Transliteration: "Gēmu wa ichinichi ichijikan" (Japanese: ゲームは一日一時間) | March 20, 2008 |
A brand new game console has been hitting the streets, the Owee!
| 99 | 50 | "Life And Video Games Are Full Of Bugs"; Transliteration: "Jinsei mo Gēmu mo bagu darake" (Japanese: 人生もゲームもバグだらけ) | March 27, 2008 |
The Shinsengumi and the Yorozuya compete against each other for the Owee. Katsura defeats Kondo in a dating sim game while Shinpachi loses to Yamazaki in Tetris. The final match is a tag team battle in a Role-playing game simulator.
