= Gintama season 1 =

Gintama
- Season 1
- No. of episodes: 49

Release
- Original network: TV Tokyo
- Original release: April 4, 2006 – March 29, 2007

Season chronology
- Next → Season 2

The first season of the Japanese anime television series Gintama is directed by Shinji Takamatsu and animated by Sunrise. It aired on TV Tokyo from April 4, 2006, to March 29, 2007, with a total of 49 episodes. The anime is based on Hideaki Sorachi's manga of the same name. The story revolves around an eccentric samurai, Gintoki Sakata, his apprentice, Shinpachi Shimura, and a teenage alien girl named Kagura. All three are "freelancers" who search for work in order to pay the monthly rent, which usually goes unpaid.

In Japan, Aniplex distributes the anime in DVD format. A total of thirteen volumes were released for the first season, between July 26, 2006, and June 26, 2007.

On January 8, 2009, the streaming video site Crunchyroll began offering English subtitled episodes of the series. The episodes are available on Crunchyroll within hours of airing in Japan to paying members. The episodes can also be watched for free a week after release. The first available episode was episode 139. On the same day, Crunchyroll also began uploading episodes from the beginning of the series at a rate of two a week. The anime is licensed by Sentai Filmworks, with distribution from Section23 Films. The first collection containing thirteen episodes was released on DVD, April 27, 2010.

This season uses six musical pieces: two opening themes and four ending themes. The first 24 episodes feature "Pray" by Tommy heavenly6. Since episode 25, the opening theme is "Tōi Nioi" (遠い匂い; lit. 'Faraway Scent') by YO-KING. The first ending theme is "Fūsen Gamu" (風船ガム; lit. 'Bubble Gum') by Captain Straydum. It is replaced in episode 14 by "Mr. Raindrop" from Amplified, which is used until episode 24. It is then followed by "Yuki no Tsubasa" (雪のツバサ; lit. 'Wings of Snow') by redballoon. Since episode 38 the ending is "Kyandi Line" (キャンディ・ライン; lit. 'Candy Line') by Hitomi Takahashi. Besides the regular themes, episode 12 uses a remixed version of "Fūsen Gamu". Episode 49 changes "Kyandi Line" as an opening, while the ending is a remix of "Tōi Nioi".

== Episodes ==
No. overall	No. in season	Title	Original release date
1–2	1–2	"You Guys!! Do You Even Have Gintama?!"; Transliteration: "Temeraaaa!! Soredemo Gintama tsuiten no kaaaa" (Japanese: てめーらァァァ!!それでも銀魂ついてんのかァァァ)	April 4, 2006
Gintoki, Shinpachi, Kagura and the rest of the cast are introduced, while some villains plan on destroying Edo.
3	3	"Nobody With Naturally Wavy Hair Can Be That Bad"; Transliteration: "Tennen pāma ni warui yatsu wa inai" (Japanese: 天然パーマに悪い奴はいない)	April 11, 2006
How Gintoki and Shinpachi first met, where Gintoki frames Shinpachi for crime over a spilled parfait and later teams up to save Shinpachi's sister, Otae, from an evil money-grubber.
4	4	"Watch Out! JUMP Sometimes Comes Out On Saturdays!"; Transliteration: "JUMP wa tokidoki doyō ni deru kara ki o tsukero" (Japanese: ジャンプは時々土曜にでるから気をつけろ)	April 25, 2006
Gintoki and Shinpachi (literally) run into Kagura-- a girl from the Yato Clan who's trying to run away from the yakuza.
5	5	"Make Friends You Can Call By Their Nicknames, Even When You're An Old Fart"; Transliteration: "Jijii ni nattemo adana de yobiaeru tomodachi o tsukure" (Japanese: ジジィになってもあだ名で呼び合える友達を作れ)	May 2, 2006
After a deliveryman crashes outside the store, the Yorozuya go to deliver a package in his stead. But the package itself is a bomb; one out of many bombings conducted by the Joi Faction's leader, and Gintoki's old friend, Katsura.
6	6	"Keep Your Promise Even If It Kills You"; Transliteration: "Ichido shita yakusoku wa shindemo mamore" (Japanese: 一度した約束は死んでも守れ)	May 9, 2006
Gintoki and Kagura encounter an escaped criminal who subsequently forces Gintoki to drive him to the concert where his daughter, a famous pop idol, is holding her performance.
7	7	"Responsible Owners Should Clean Up After Their Pets"; Transliteration: "Petto wa kainushiga sekinin o motte saigo made mendō o mimashō" (Japanese: ペットは飼い主が責任をもって最後まで面倒を見ましょう)	May 16, 2006
Prince Hata, the prince of an alien kingdom, is missing his pet, and requests the Yorozuya find it.
8	8	"There Is Butt A Fine Line Between Persistence And Stubbornness"; Transliteration: "Nebarizuyosa to shitsukosa wa kamihitoe" (Japanese: 粘り強さとしつこさは紙一重)	May 23, 2006
Otae requests the Yorozuya to do something about Kondou, who's been stalking her ever since she turned down his marriage proposal.
9	9	"Fighting Should Be Done With Fists"; Transliteration: "Kenka wa gū de yarubeshi" (Japanese: 喧嘩はグーでやるべし)	May 30, 2006
After hearing how Kondou was beaten by "a silver haired samurai", the Shinsengumi decide to reclaim his honor by finding the samurai to fight him.
10	10	"Eat Something Sour When You're Tired"; Transliteration: "Tsukareta toki wa suppai mono o" (Japanese: 疲れたときは酸っぱいものを)	June 6, 2006
Someone has left a giant dog at the Yorozuya's front door with a note asking them to take care of it. Kagura insists on keeping the dog, much to Gintoki's and Shinpachi's dismay.
11	11	"Look, Overly Sticky Sweet Dumplings Are Not Real Dumplings, You Idiot!"; Transliteration: "Becha becha shita dango nantena dango jane bakayarō" (Japanese: べちゃべちゃした団子なんてなァ団子じゃねぇバカヤロー)	June 13, 2006
An old man on his deathbed enlists the Yorozuya in finding the owner of a hairpin, a woman he fell in love with fifty years ago.
12	12	"People Who Make Good First Impressions Usually Suck"; Transliteration: "Daiichi inshō ga ii yatsu ni roku na yatsu wa inai" (Japanese: 第一印象がいい奴にロクな奴はいない)	June 13, 2006
Otose gets a new helper at her shop in the form of Catherine, a cat-eared Amanto who steals everything in sight.
13	13	"If You're Going To Cosplay, Go All Out"; Transliteration: "Kosupure suru nara kokoro made kazare" (Japanese: コスプレするなら心まで飾れ)	June 20, 2006
While looking for the missing daughter of a wealthy family, the Yorozuya get caught up in the workings of the Harusame, an Amanto group of drug-smuggling space pirates. However, things do not go immediately as planned and Gintoki and Katsura team up together to rescue Kagura and Shinpachi.
14	14	"Boys Have A Weird Ritual That Makes Them Think They Turn Into Men When They Touch A Frog"; Transliteration: "Otoko ni wa kaeru ni sawarete ichininmae mitai na wake no wakaranai rūru ga aru" (Japanese: 男にはカエルに触れて一人前みたいな訳のわからないルールがある)	July 4, 2006
14	14	"You Only Gotta Wash Under Your Armpits - Just The Armpits"; Transliteration: "Waki dake arattokya iin dayo waki dake" (Japanese: 脇だけ洗っときゃいいんだよ脇だけ)	July 4, 2006
After the previous episode, the Shinsengumi protect one of the arrested drug dealers from an assassin. Kagura spends the day with a runaway princess, who longs to be an ordinary girl. Note: The ending theme was changed to "Mr Raindrop" by Amplified
15	15	"Pets Resemble Their Owners"; Transliteration: "Kainushi to petto wa niru" (Japanese: 飼い主とペットは似る)	July 11, 2006
Katsura receives a creature from outer space from an old friend, Sakamoto, while around the same time the Yorozuya plan to enter Sadaharu in a pet television show in an attempt to earn their rent money.
16	16	"If You Stop And Think About It, Your Life's A Lot Longer As An Old Guy Than A Kid! Whoa, Scary!"; Transliteration: "Kangaetara jinseitte ossan ni natte kara no hō ga nagaijane-ka! kowa!!" (Japanese: 考えたら人生ってオッさんになってからの方が長いじゃねーか!怖っ!!)	July 18, 2006
An unemployed Hasegawa takes a job as a cab driver, forcing him to debate his morality against his ego.
17	17	"Sons Only Take After Their Fathers' Negative Attributes"; Transliteration: "Oyakotte no wa kirai na tokobakari niru mon da" (Japanese: 親子ってのは嫌いなとこばかり似るもんだ)	July 25, 2006
The Yorozuya spend time with a robot tinkerer preparing for a special festival, but his scars of the past force him under the manipulation of Gintoki's former Joi ally Shinsuke Takasugi.
18	18	"Oh, Yeah! Our Crib Is Number One!"; Transliteration: "Aa yappari wagayaga ichiban da wa" (Japanese: ああやっぱり我が家が一番だわ)	August 1, 2006
The Yorozuya and Shinsengumi team up to take down a harassing "Robin Hood" stealing women's panties.
19	19	"Why Is The Sea So Salty? Because You City Folk Pee Whenever You Go Swimming!"; Transliteration: "Umi ga naze shoppai dato? Ome-ra tokaijin ga oyoginagara yō tashiteku kara darō-gaaa" (Japanese: 海がなぜしょっぱいだと?オメーら都会人が泳ぎながら用足してくからだろーがァァ)	August 8, 2006
In an effort to get some quick cash, Gintoki and Hasegawa, along with Shinpachi, Kagura, and Otae, head to the beach to get rid of a monster that's been terrorizing the area.
20	20	"Watch Out For Conveyor Belts!"; Transliteration: "Beruto konbea ni wa ki o tsukero" (Japanese: ベルトコンベアには気をつけろ)	August 15, 2006
The Shinsengumi find that their base is being haunted by a ghost. The Yorozuya get involved, and together, they try to discover the meaning behind the matter.
21	21	"If You're A Man, Try The Swordfish!"; Transliteration: "Otoko nara toriaezu kajiki" (Japanese: 男ならとりあえずカジキ)	August 22, 2006
21	21	"If You Go To Sleep With The Fan On You'll Get A Stomachache, So Be Careful"; Transliteration: "Senpūki tsukeppanashide neruto onaka kowashichau kara ki o tsukete" (Japanese: 扇風機つけっぱなしで寝るとおなか壊しちゃうから気をつけて)	August 22, 2006
The Yorozuya help a kappa-like Amanto defend his lake from developers who want to get rid of it. The Yorozuya's fan breaks in the middle of a heat wave and Gintoki gets involved in a bizarre plot while trying to get a new one.
22	22	"Marriage Is Prolonging An Illusion For Your Whole Life"; Transliteration: "Kekkon to wa kanchigai o isshōgai shitsuzukeru koto da" (Japanese: 結婚とは勘違いを一生涯し続けることだ)	September 5, 2006
A mysterious nearsighted kunoichi suddenly appears alongside Gintoki, yet this turns out to be a ploy to use him for her latest mission.
23	23	"When You're In A Fix, Keep On Laughing, Laughing..."; Transliteration: "Komatta toki wa warattoke warattoke" (Japanese: 困ったときは笑っとけ笑っとけ)	September 12, 2006
Kagura wins a trip to space for three. But while the Yorozuya are on the spaceship, so are a group of hijackers and Gintoki's old friend, Sakamoto.
24	24	"Cute Faces Are Always Hiding Something"; Transliteration: "Kawaii kao ni wa kanarazu nanikaga kakureteru" (Japanese: カワイイ顔には必ず何かが隠れてる)	September 19, 2006
Gintoki gets roped into working at an okama bar, where he and Katsura work to try to help the owner's son come to grips with both sides of his father.
25	25	"A Shared Soup Pot Is A Microcosm Of Life"; Transliteration: "Nabe wa jinsei no shukuzu de aru" (Japanese: 鍋は人生の縮図である)	October 5, 2006
The series is entering into its second season! But the Yorozuya have other concerns: a battle of wits and deception to take reign of the nabe pot!
26	26	"Don't Be Shy - Just Raise Your Hand And Say It"; Transliteration: "Hazukashi garazu ni te o agete ie" (Japanese: 恥ずかしがらずに手を挙げて言え)	October 12, 2006
Shinpachi has a sudden meeting with an old friend who has joined a gang to get tougher.
27	27	"Some Things Can't Be Cut With A Sword"; Transliteration: "Katana ja kirenai mono ga aru" (Japanese: 刀じゃ斬れないものがある)	October 19, 2006
Okita asks the Yorozuya to investigate an underground fighting ring, but the gang finds out that there's more to one of the members than it seems.
28	28	"Good Things Never Come In Twos (But Bad Things Do)"; Transliteration: "Ii koto wa renzoku shite okoranai kuse ni warui koto wa renzoku shite okoru mon da" (Japanese: いい事は連続して起こらないくせに悪い事は連続して起こるもんだ)	October 26, 2006
Kondo is forced to go with his superior to make a report to the Amanto after the events that happened at the underground fighting ring.
29	29	"Don't Panic - There's A Return Policy!"; Transliteration: "Awateruna! Kūringu ofu to iu mono ga aru" (Japanese: 慌てるな!クーリングオフというものがある)	November 2, 2006
29	29	"I Told You To Pay Attention To The News!"; Transliteration: "Terebi toka shinbun toka chanto minaito damedatte" (Japanese: テレビとか新聞とかちゃんと見ないとダメだって)	November 2, 2006
While trying to pawn off Gintoki's wooden sword, Kagura is attacked by a crazed sword collector, who believes that Gintoki's sword is the one he's been looking for. The Yorozuya find themselves at ground zero of an invasion of space-cockroaches.
30	30	"Even Teen Idols Act Like You Guys"; Transliteration: "Aidoru datte hobo omaera to onaji koto yattendayo" (Japanese: アイドルだってほぼお前らと同じ事やってんだよ)	November 9, 2006
Pop idol Otsu has been receiving threatening letters lately, and it is up to the Yorozuya to investigate.
31	31	"You Always Remember The Things That Matter The Least"; Transliteration: "Dōdemoii koto ni kagitte nakanaka wasurenai" (Japanese: どうでもいい事に限ってなかなか忘れない)	November 16, 2006
While getting his usual JUMP, Gintoki gets into an accident and gets amnesia as a result.
32	32	"Life Moves On Like A Conveyor Belt"; Transliteration: "Jinsei wa beruto konbea no yōni nagareru" (Japanese: 人生はベルトコンベアのように流れる)	November 23, 2006
After leaving Kagura and Shinpachi in order to let them live their own lives, the amnesiac Gintoki starts working at a Justaway factory that happens to be under suspicion by the Shinsengumi.
33	33	"Mistaking Someone's Name Is Rude!"; Transliteration: "Hito no namae toka machigaeru no shitsurei da" (Japanese: 人の名前とか間違えるの失礼だ)	November 30, 2006
The Yorozuya receive two Amanto carpenters from Sakamoto as an apology for destroying their home two episodes back.
34	34	"Love Doesn't Require A Manual"; Transliteration: "Koi ni manyuaru nante iranai" (Japanese: 恋にマニュアルなんていらない)	December 7, 2006
Shinpachi (inadvertently) saves a cat-eared Amanto girl being harassed on the train and in return, she wants to show her appreciation to him.
35	35	"Love Doesn't Require A Manual (Continued)"; Transliteration: "Koi ni manyuaru nante iranai (enchōsen)" (Japanese: 恋にマニュアルなんていらない(延長戦))	December 14, 2006
35	35	"You Can't Judge A Person By His Appearance, Either"; Transliteration: "Gaiken dake de hito o handan shicha dame" (Japanese: 外見だけで人を判断しちゃダメ)	December 14, 2006
Shinpachi discovers the true nature of the cat-eared Amanto as Gintoki, Kagura and Otae attempt to bring her down. Matsudaira wants Kondou, Sougo, and Hijikata to help him take out his daughter's boyfriend at an amusement park.
36	36	"People With Dark Pasts Can't Shut Up"; Transliteration: "Sune ni kizu ga aruyatsu hodo yoku shaberu" (Japanese: すねに傷がある奴ほどよくしゃべる)	December 21, 2006
One of Otae's colleagues runs into trouble with a bizarre cult run by a conman, and Otae enlists the Yorozuya to getting her money back.
37	37	"People Who Say That Santa Doesn't Really Exist Actually Want To Believe In Him"; Transliteration: "Santa nante inēndayotte iiharu yatsu koso honto wa irutte shinjitaindayo" (Japanese: サンタなんていねーんだよって言い張る奴こそホントはいるって信じたいんだよ)	December 28, 2006
37	37	"Prayer Won't Make Your Worldly Desires Go Away! Control Yourself"; Transliteration: "Bonnō ga kane de kieru kaaa onore de seigyo shiro onore de" (Japanese: 煩悩が鐘で消えるかァァ己で制御しろ己で)	December 28, 2006
Gintoki meets Santa & his "reindeer" and attempts to improve their image and find the true meaning of Christmas. On a rowdy New Year's Eve, Gintoki and Zenzou go head to head in order to obtain the last available copy of JUMP while further encountering more terrorists from the Justaway incident.
38	38	"Only Children Play In The Snow"; Transliteration: "Yuki de hashagu no kodomo dake" (Japanese: 雪ではしゃぐの子供だけ)	January 11, 2007
38	38	"Eating Ice Cream In Winter Is Awesome"; Transliteration: "Fuyu ni taberu aisu mo nakanaka otsu na monda" (Japanese: 冬に食べるアイスもなかなかオツなモンだ)	January 11, 2007
Everyone in Kabuki-cho participates in the neighborhood snow building contest, causing one disaster after another. The Yorozuya are hired to look after an old fireworks master gone senile from not doing what he loves.
39	39	"Ramen Shops With Long Menus Never Do Well"; Transliteration: "Menyū ga ōi rāmen'ya wa taitei hayattenai" (Japanese: メニューが多いラーメン屋はたいてい流行ってない)	January 18, 2007
While injured and hiding from the Shinsengumi, Katsura ends up working at a ramen restaurant owned by Ikumatsu, a woman who hates the Joi Faction.
40	40	"Give A Thought To Planned Pregnancy"; Transliteration: "Kozukuri wa keikaku teki ni" (Japanese: 子作りは計画的に)	January 25, 2007
Famed alien hunter Umibozu arrives in Edo, both to stop a parasitic menace... and to visit his daughter Kagura.
41	41	"You Can't Judge A Movie By Its Title"; Transliteration: "Taitoru dakeja eiga no omoshirosa wa wakannai" (Japanese: タイトルだけじゃ映画の面白さはわかんない)	February 1, 2007
Shinpachi quits the Yorozuya and goes to try to save Kagura. Meanwhile, on Kagura's return ship, the former alien threat (Prince Hata's latest pet) is accidentally freed and all hell breaks loose...
42	42	"You Know What Happens If You Pee On A Worm"; Transliteration: "Mimizu ni oshikko kakeru to hareruyo" (Japanese: ミミズにおしっこかけると腫れるよ)	February 8, 2007
Teaming up with Umibozu, Gintoki takes down the alien to save Kagura while trying to avoid the attacks of the Shogunate.
43	43	"Make Characters So Anybody Can Tell Who They Are By Just Their Silhouettes"; Transliteration: "Kyarakutā wa shiruetto dake de dokusha ni miwakega tsukuyōni kakimashō" (Japanese: キャラクターはシルエットだけで読者に見分けがつくように描きましょう)	February 15, 2007
43	43	"Since It Ended A Bit Early, We're Starting The Next One"; Transliteration: "Nanka hayaku owatchatta node jikai no hanashi o hajimechaou" (Japanese: なんか早く終わっちゃったので次回の話をはじめちゃおう)	February 15, 2007
As Kagura tries to return to the Yorozuya, she witnesses the aftermath for the rest of the cast while Otae, Sa-chan, and Catherine all try to go for the series' heroine position. Katsura enlists the Yorozuya to help him save Elizabeth, but the difficulty of sneaking in forces them to bring in an expert to help them: Sa-chan.
44	44	"Mom's Busy, Too, So Quit Complaining About What's For Dinner"; Transliteration: "Okāsan datte isogashiin dakara yūhan no menyū ni monku tsukeru no yamenasai" (Japanese: お母さんだって忙しいんだから夕飯のメニューに文句つけるの止めなさい)	February 22, 2007
After completing their training with Sa-chan, Katsura and the Yorozuya head forth to save Elizabeth, only to face various traps and other ninjas standing in their way!
45	45	"Walk Your Dog At An Appropriate Speed"; Transliteration: "Aiken no sanpo wa tekido na supīdo de" (Japanese: 愛犬の散歩は適度なスピードで)	March 1, 2007
Sadaharu becomes a demon that the Yorozuya tries to rescue with the help of former priestess sisters.
46	46	"Adults Only. We Wouldn't Want Anyone Immature In Here..."; Transliteration: "XX asobi wa hatachi ni natte kara" (Japanese: XX遊びは20歳になってから)	March 8, 2007
Otae and one of Sadaharu's former priestess owners square off to keep their jobs by trying to out-earn each other.
47	47	"Do Cherries Come From Cherry Trees?"; Transliteration: "Sakuranbotte are sakura no ki ni naruno?" (Japanese: さくらんぼってアレ桜の木になるの?)	March 15, 2007
The Yorozuya get a new neighbor, a frightening looking Amanto named Hedoro, and assume he's up to something.
48	48	"The More You're Alike, The More You Fight"; Transliteration: "Niteru futari wa kenka suru" (Japanese: 似てる二人は喧嘩する)	March 22, 2007
48	48	"Whatever You Play, Play To Win"; Transliteration: "Nande are yarukara niwa makecha dame" (Japanese: 何であれ やるからには負けちゃダメ)	March 22, 2007
A group of assassins want to take Hijikata out. The problem: none of them really expected what would happen when he encounters Gintoki. Gintoki, Shinpachi and Kagura encounter an old man who "forces" them to play games with him, at the same time the local ninja gather for the funeral of Hattori's father.
49	49	"A Life Without Gambling Is Like Sushi Without Wasabi"; Transliteration: "Gyanburu no nai jinsei nante wasabi nuki no sushi mitē na monda" (Japanese: ギャンブルのない人生なんてわさび抜きの寿司みてぇなもんだ)	March 29, 2007
Gintoki and Hasegawa run into some gambling problems, forcing them and a gambling legend into a showdown with the Kabuki-cho casino queen.
