= Gintama season 3 =

Gintama
- Season 3
- Cover from the first DVD of Gintama's third season
- No. of episodes: 51

Release
- Original network: TV Tokyo
- Original release: April 4, 2008 – March 26, 2009

Season chronology
- ← Previous; Season 2 Next → Season 4

The episodes of the third season of the Japanese anime television series Gintama aired on Japan's TV Tokyo from April 3, 2008, to March 26, 2009. The third season has a total of 51 episodes expanding the series' episodes to 150. They are animated by Sunrise. Episodes 100 to 105 were directed by Shinji Takamatsu and Yoichi Fujita, while in following episodes Fujita was the only director. The anime is based on Hideaki Sorachi's manga of the same name. The story revolves around an eccentric samurai, Gintoki Sakata, his apprentice, Shinpachi Shimura, and a teenage alien girl named Kagura. All three are "free-lancers" who search for work in order to pay the monthly rent, which usually goes unpaid anyway.

In Japan, Aniplex distributes the anime in DVD format. The first volume of the third season was released on August 27, 2008.

On January 8, 2009, the streaming video site Crunchyroll began offering English subtitled episodes of the series. The episodes are available on Crunchyroll within hours of airing in Japan to paying members. The episodes can also be watched for free a week after release. The first available episode was episode 139. On the same day, Crunchyroll also began uploading episodes from the beginning of the series at a rate of two a week.

Like previous seasons, the third season uses six pieces of musical themes: two opening themes and four ending themes. The first twenty-six episodes use "Donten" (曇天; lit. 'Cloudy Weather') by Does as the opening theme. "Anata Magic" (アナタMAGIC; lit. 'Your Magic') by Monobright replaces "Donten" for the following episodes. The first ending theme is "Sanagi" (lit. "Chrysalis") by POSSIBILITY. Since episode 113, the ending theme is "This world is yours" by Plingmin. Episodes 126–138 replace "This world is yours" with I, Ai, Ai (I 、愛、会い; lit. 'I, Love, Meeting') by GHOSTNOTE. The four ending used since episode 139 is SHIGI's "Kagayaita" (輝いた; lit. 'Shining'). Episodes 105 and 150 exchange the use of the themes; this leaves episode 105 with "Sanagi" as the opening and with "Donten" as the ending while "Kagayaita" and "Anata Magic" are the opening and ending themes, respectively, in episode 150.

== Episodes ==
No. overall	No. in season	Title	Original release date
100	1	"The More Something Is Disliked, The More Lovely It Is"; Transliteration: "Sukarenai mono hodo itōshii" (Japanese: 好かれないものほど愛おしい)	April 3, 2008
Gintoki gives suggestions to the editor and author of "Gintaman" on what should be improved.
101	2	"Rules Are Made To Be Broken"; Transliteration: "Okite wa yaburu tame ni koso aru" (Japanese: 掟は破るためにこそある)	April 10, 2008
Hijikata replaces his sword with a blade cursed by the spirit of an otaku just as Shinsengumi advisor Itou returns to run the organization.
102	3	"Otaku Are Talkative"; Transliteration: "Otaku wa hanashizuki" (Japanese: オタクは話好き)	April 17, 2008
Hijikata, now fully possessed by the otaku blade, begs Gintoki for help to save the Shinsengumi as Itou reveals his true colors.
103	4	"There's A Thin Line Between Strengths And Weaknesses"; Transliteration: "Chōsho to tansho wa kamihitoe" (Japanese: 長所と短所は紙一重)	April 24, 2008
Okita appears to save Kondo from the rebel Shinsengumi led by Itou. The Yorozuya along with Hijikata are also on their way to the scene.
104	5	"Important Things Are Hard To See"; Transliteration: "Taisetsu na mono wa mienikui" (Japanese: 大切なものは見えにくい)	May 1, 2008
Hijikata gives a heartfelt speech of how Kondo is important to the Shinsengumi and how Hijikata, Okita, and their comrades will give their lives to protect Kondo. Now fully free from the curse, Hijikata battles against Itou. The Shinsengumi and Kihetai soldiers engage in a bloody battle. Meanwhile, Gintoki is forced into a confrontation with none other than Bansai Kawakami, right-hand man to Takasugi. Bansai explains how Takasugi exploited Itou's arrogance and pride to make Itou think he has a place in the Kihetai but was never intended to be. Bansai blows up a nearby bridge where the train passed by and Itou wakes up with his left arm cut off after his battle with Hijikata. At that moment, a Kihetai operative tries to kill Itou, when he reminisces his childhood; as a child, he was a gifted with academic and physical skills but was shunned by his classmates and even his parents— so much so that his mother wished he was never born and that the family heir would go to his sickly older brother, Takahisa. In the present, Kondo and the others save Itou from falling, when the latter realizes that all he ever needed were friends and they were there right along. In a final attack, Bansai entangles Gintoki in garrotte wiring from his biwa when a chopper gunner shoots the train— Gintoki frees himself from the wire and attacks the chopper, but it's revealed that Itou used himself as a shield to protect everyone else then falls unconscious.
105	6	"It's All About The Beat And Timing"; Transliteration: "Nanigoto mo norito taimingu" (Japanese: 何事もノリとタイミング)	May 8, 2008
Gintoki attacks the chopper but Bansai slashes his shoulder, making the former fall down. However, Gintoki takes down the chopper by wrapping Bansai's garrote wires around the chopper. Now with the Shinsengumi's morale restored, the Kihetai retreat. Shinpachi asks why Itou protected them despite his rebellion to which the latter responds that he found people to protect and doesn't want to die after finding said people. The Shinsengumi take him away to face his punishment and final duel with Hijikata – facing his death as a Samurai, Itou finds peace in having his comrades around him. Afterwards, Bansai is alive and reports to Takasugi. Some time later, Yamazaki is revealed to be alive after Bansai spared his life. Hijikata regains his purpose and continue on the path he was chosen – later, he returns and is welcomed back to the Shinsengumi as their rightful Vice-Chief.
106	7	"Love Is Often Played Out In Sudden Death"; Transliteration: "Ren'aitte taitei sadondesu hōshiki" (Japanese: 恋愛ってたいていサドンデス方式)	May 15, 2008
Kagura accidentally knocks out an international soccer team by giving them dirtywater from a janitor's bucket and now the Yorozuya and others have to fill the empty positions.
107	8	"Kids Don't Understand How Their Parents Feel"; Transliteration: "Oya no kokoro ko shirazu" (Japanese: 親の心子知らず)	May 22, 2008
The Yorozuya are hired by Kaguzo Mashiroi, a Yakuza boss, to help his son Utsuzo who has become a hikikomori. Five years ago, Utsuzo locked himself in a storehouse after a dispute with his father but he frequently sends notes for his meals and needs to prove he's alive -- as such Kaguzo hired the Yoruzuya to get Utsuzo out. After several unsuccessful attempts (Kagura shooting the warehouse, acting as the police, and smoking Utsuzo out), Kyojiro Nakamura, the lieutenant, tells Kaguzo to give it time as Utsuzo will come out on his own; at that moment, Kaguzo collapses and is hospitalized. Later that night, Kyojiro and Gintoki talk about Utsuzo's past and attempt to bring him out one more time -- however, Gintoki finds a woman inside as Kyojiro says that Utsuzo is dead. The two fight with Gintoki getting shot and poisoned, and Kyojiro proclaiming that Utsuzo was a nuisance and killed him. Gintoki manages to fend off the gangsters but after getting shot again, he falls into the river. Later on, Kaguzo dies and Kyojiro would be the new boss.
108	9	"Some Things Are Better Left Unsaid"; Transliteration: "Iwanuga hana" (Japanese: 言わぬが花)	May 29, 2008
The Yakuza hold the funeral for Kaguzo. Shinpachi and Kagura become worried after Gintoki didn't return home; Kyojiro tells them that Gintoki left after knowing that their job was unsuccessful but Shinpachi finds that odd because Gintoki wouldn't do that as he is a resolute man. Meanwhile, the syndicate superiors discuss a plan for Kyojiro's succession -- the next day, Kyojiro is decided as the successor. He thinks of his past when Kaguzo took him in from the streets and how he respected the elder. At the inauguration, Gintoki incapacitates the bosses and attacks Kyojiro -- the latter then deduces that he was set up for death by the syndicate. Kyojiro still came, knowing it was a setup and he thinks of how Kaguzo scolded Utsuzo for refusing to be the heir then the son shut himself out. Knowing he was terminally ill, Kaguzo lamented about never showing affection to Utsuzo; however, Kyojiro discovers that Utsuzo killed himself because of the argument. As such, Kyojiro took the pretense of killing him in order to never let Kaguzo know the truth. Gintoki assists Kyojiro in taking down the underlings but the latter gets fatally shot in the process; Gintoki takes him to Kaguzo's grave and assures Kyojiro was always a loyal person even if he carried the guilt of Utsuzo's death. Finally arriving at the cemetery, Kyojiro dies after finding peace with himself from always respecting and staying loyal to Kaguzo and Utsuzo.
109	10	"Life Is A Test"; Transliteration: "Jinsei wa shiken da" (Japanese: 人生は試験だ)	June 5, 2008
Yamazaki, with the intent of spying on the Joui faction, undergoes the necessary testing and training as one of its new recruits.
110	11	"People Are All Escapees Of Their Own Inner Prisons"; Transliteration: "Hito wa mina jibun toiu ori o yaburu datsugoku shū" (Japanese: 人は皆自分という檻を破る脱獄囚)	June 12, 2008
Inmate Suekichi finds ways to make Katsura fall asleep so he can make a secret escape.
111	12	"Definitely Do Not Let Your Girlfriend See The Things You Use For Cross-Dressing"; Transliteration: "NH mono wa kanojo ni mitsukaru na" (Japanese: NH物は彼女に見つかるな)	June 19, 2008
111	12	"There's Almost A 100% Chance You'll Forget Your Umbrella And Hate Yourself For It"; Transliteration: "Hobo 100% no kakuritsu de binīrugasa o okiwasurete kuru jibun ga kirai" (Japanese: ほぼ100%の確率でビニール傘を置き忘れてくる自分が嫌い)	June 19, 2008
The Yorozuya are asked by a cross-dresser hostess to help with the courting of a host. A story about Kagura and an umbrella during the rainy season.
112	13	"Lucky Is A Man Who Gets Up And Goes To Work"; Transliteration: "Nijūdai no Tanjoubi ni Fukai Imi wa nai / Okite hataraku kahōmono" (Japanese: 二十代の誕生日に深い意味はない/ 起きて働く果報者)	June 26, 2008
Katsura briefly takes over the series in an attempt to promote his birthday; in the main story, Gintoki attempts to help Tama find a way to enjoy herself.
113	14	"Cleaning The Toilet Cleanses The Soul"; Transliteration: "Benki o migaku koto kore kokoro o migaku koto nari" (Japanese: 便器を磨く事これ心を磨く事なり)	July 3, 2008
A member of the Shinsengumi suggests a "washroom revolution". Eventually it evolves into a battle of Shinsengumi vs. washroom germs.
114	15	"They Say Soy Sauce On Pudding Tastes Like Sea Urchin, But Soy Sauce On Pudding Only Tastes Like Pudding And Soy Sauce"; Transliteration: "Purin ni shōyu kake tara uni no aji ga surutte iu kedo purin ni shōyu kake te mo purin to shōyu no aji shika shinai" (Japanese: プリンに醤油かけたらウニの味がするって言うけどプリンに醤油かけてもプリンと醤油の味しかしない)	July 10, 2008
After Kuriko (Matsudaira's daughter) is saved from her co-workers by Hijikata, she falls in love with him. To avoid getting killed by Matsudaira (who most likely would disapprove of this relationship), Hijikata must somehow dump Kuriko without hurting her feelings.
115	16	"Summer Vacation Is The Most Fun Right Before It Begins"; Transliteration: "Natsuyasumi wa hajimaru mae ga ichiban tanoshii" (Japanese: 夏休みは始まる前が一番楽しい)	July 17, 2008
Gintoki, Shinpachi, Kagura, Kyuubei, Otae, Hasegawa, and Katsura are shipwrecked on an island, and find themselves caught in a plot involving the legendary palace of Ryugu-jo.
116	17	"The Older, The Wiser"; Transliteration: "Kamenokō yori toshinokō" (Japanese: 亀の甲より年の功)	July 24, 2008
With Katsura and Gintoki having been turned into old men, the rest of the group must try to stop the rest of Edo becoming permanently (and prematurely) aged, as per the plans of Ryugu-jo's ruler, Otohime.
117	18	"Beauty Is Like A Summer Fruit"; Transliteration: "Bi wa natsu no kajitsu no gotoki mono" (Japanese: 美は夏の果実の如き物)	July 31, 2008
Otae faces off against Otohime. Kyubei and Kagura try to help her, and Shinpachi, Katsura, and Gintoki try to find a way to stop the age-cannon from firing. In the meantime, Hasegawa and Kamenashi try to support them as best as they can.
118	19	"Even If Your Back Is Bent, Go Straight Forward"; Transliteration: "Koshi wa magatte mo massugu ni" (Japanese: 腰は曲がってもまっすぐに)	August 7, 2008
The final episode in the Ryugu-jo arc. With Gintoki, Katsura, and the entirety of Edo returned to normal, the group have a final talk with Otohime on 'beauty'.
119	20	"Within Each Box Of Cigarettes, Are One Or Two Cigarettes That Smell Like Horse Dung"; Transliteration: "Tabako wa hitohako ni ichi, nihon bafun mitai na nioi no suru yatsu ga haitte iru" (Japanese: タバコは一箱に一、二本馬糞みたいな匂いのする奴が入っている)	August 14, 2008
Chain smoker Hijikata is forced to leave Earth and search for another planet where he can light up, after a smoking ban was implemented in Edo. He meets an alien race on a tobacco-producing planet, only to assist them against a horrific tyrant.
120	21	"Japanese Restaurants Abroad Taste Pretty Much Like School Cafeteria Lunches"; Transliteration: "Kaigai no nippon ryōriten no aji wa daitai gakushoku reberu" (Japanese: 海外の日本料理店の味はだいたい学食レベル)	August 21, 2008
120	21	"Once You've Taken A Dish, You Can't Put It Back"; Transliteration: "Ichido totta sara wa modosanai" (Japanese: 一度取った皿は戻さない)	August 21, 2008
Because of their treatment of humans, Katsura infiltrates an Amanto-run seafood restaurant in the hopes of destroying the business. The Yorozuya, Otae, Otose, Catherine, and Tama all go out for the day to help at the sushi restaurant Hasegawa is currently managing.
121	22	"Novices Only Need A Flathead And A Phillips"; Transliteration: "Shirōto wa purasu to mainasu dake de jūbun da" (Japanese: 素人はプラスとマイナスだけで十分だ)	August 28, 2008
The Yorozuya visit the world of an online Role-playing game to search for the Amanto who are responsible for turning them into screwdriver heads.
122	23	"Imagination Is Nurtured In The 8th Grade"; Transliteration: "Sōzō ryoku wa chū 2 de tsuchikawareru" (Japanese: 想像力は中2で培われる)	September 4, 2008
The Yorozuya meet familiar "faces" on their journey in the RPG world while searching for the culprits for their "modified" bodies.
123	24	"Always Keep A Screwdriver In Your Heart"; Transliteration: "Itsumo kokoro ni ippon no doraibā" (Japanese: いつも心に一本のドライバー)	September 11, 2008
Everyone seems to have given up on getting their original bodies back; except for Sa-chan, who continues to gather leads to organize one final attempt in the real world, but she'll need the others to help.
124	25	"When Nagging Goes Too Far It Becomes Intimidating"; Transliteration: "Onedari mo do ga sugireba kyōhaku" (Japanese: おねだりも度がすぎれば脅迫)	September 18, 2008
Otsu has overcome her past scandals and became Edo's top idol. And the release date of her new single has finally been announced! Shinpachi and her other fans are overjoyed at the news. But trouble arises right before the release. Otsu's music producer, Tsunpo, is late with the creation of her song and says the release will be postponed. Otsu is determined not to betray her fans and takes her own actions, but...
125	26	"Entering The Final Chapter!"; Transliteration: "Saishūshō totsunyū!" (Japanese: 最終章突入!)	September 25, 2008
On news of the series entering its final arc, the characters go over their choice of best moments in the series. The second half of this episode contains "Even if You're Not Drunk, Act Like You Are and Pull Off Your Supervisor's Toupee", which is based on Chapter 17 of the manga. Brief summary: When the Yorozuya decide to have a picnic while viewing the cherry blossoms (Sakura Trees,) they are confronted by the Shinsengumi, who claim that Gintoki and his friends must move elsewhere. It seems the picnic spot they chose is the Shinsengumi's official cherry blossom viewing reserved spot – or so Hijikata claims. Gintoki refuses to move, so the two groups settle the dispute by some rather questionable versions of Janken – Rock, Paper, Scissors.
126	27	"Some Things Can Only Be Conveyed Through The Written Word"; Transliteration: "Moji de shika tsutawaranai mono ga aru" (Japanese: 文字でしか伝わらないものがある)	October 2, 2008
Shinpachi finds a letter on the beach, and decides to become a pen pal with the girl who wrote the letter.
127	28	"Sometimes You Must Meet To Understand"; Transliteration: "Awanai to wakaranai koto mo aru" (Japanese: 会わないとわからないこともある)	October 9, 2008
Continuing from the previous episode, Gintoki, Kondo and Hijikata help Shinpachi to write letters to his new pen pal.
128	29	"Sometimes You Can't Tell Just By Meeting Someone"; Transliteration: "Attemo wakaranai koto mo aru" (Japanese: 会ってもわからないこともある)	October 16, 2008
The truth unfolds when Urara's sister meets the real Shinpachi
129	30	"Beware Of Food You Pick Up Off The Ground"; Transliteration: "Hiroigui ni ki o tsukero" (Japanese: 拾い食いに気をつけろ)	October 23, 2008
As Sadaharu suddenly loses his appetite, Kagura takes him to a veterinarian. There, they also encounter Katsura, who is there because Elizabeth is in bad health. Sadaharu and Kagura stay there overnight to be sure that Sadaharu gets well. Around this time an old dog who is on the verge of death is there also. It happens that his owner will die soon too, so Kagura decides to take the dog to his owner.
130	31	"Cat Lovers And Dog Lovers Are Mutually Exclusive"; Transliteration: "Nekozuki to inuzuki wa aiirenai" (Japanese: 猫好きと犬好きは相容れない)	October 30, 2008
Kintaro (a space demon embodied old dog), together with Kagura, are fleeing from a band of cats (the space demon's nemesis embodied cats). The owner of Kintaro, despite his ailing health, goes to search for the dog. Both of them want each other to die before themselves (for different reasons).
131	32	"Fights Often Ensue During Trips"; Transliteration: "Ryokōsaki dewa daitai Kenka suru" (Japanese: 旅行先ではだいたいケンカする)	November 6, 2008
Otose sends the Yorozuya and Otae go to a hot spring resort to assist the owner, Oiwa, in managing the inn. Gintoki and Shinpachi begin seeing ghosts at the resort, which Gintoki persists to be beings known as Stands. Shinpachi, Kagura, and Otae become possessed by the spirits forcing Gintoki to confront Oiwa about the inn. After passing a hallway full of spirits, Oiwa commends Gintoki, telling him he is suitable for the job.
132	33	"Briefs Will Unavoidably Get Skidmarks"; Transliteration: "Burīfu no XX suji wa zettai fukahi" (Japanese: ブリーフの××筋は絶対不可避)	November 13, 2008
Oiwa recruits Gintoki as an employee of the inn by holding his possessed friends hostage. The inn is revealed to be a resort for spirits that are unable to pass onto the afterlife and have remained on Earth. Gintoki begins plotting a rebellion alongside the ghost employee, Rei, to overthrow Oiwa and free his friends. Oiwa, aware of his plans, is able to stop his rebellion and tells Gintoki he will work for her forever.
133	34	"Gin And His Excellency's Good-For-Nothings"; Transliteration: "Gin to kakka no gokutsubushi" (Japanese: 銀と閣下の穀潰し)	November 20, 2008
Gintoki and Rei are both imprisoned in their respective cells. With the assistance of the spirits of his friends who have been ejected from their bodies, Gintoki is able to escape his prison and exorcise one of the inn's most important customers. Oiwa fuses with the spirit of her late husband and combats Gintoki, knocking him into Rei's prison. Gintoki fuses with Rei allowing him to knock Oiwa back.
134	35	"Be Very Careful When Using Ghost Stories"; Transliteration: "Yūrei neta yaru toki wa shinchō ni" (Japanese: 幽霊ネタやる時は慎重に)	November 27, 2008
Gintoki eventually defeats Oiwa with the assistance of his friends, causing Oiwa's late husband to lose control and absorb everyone's spirit in the vicinity. When Rei sacrifices herself to save Oiwa, she acknowledges her wrongdoings in keeping the spirits on Earth instead of exorcising them, and thanks the spirits for keeping her company. Her words cause her late husband and all the spirits that were absorbed to move into the afterlife. The next day, Gintoki and his friends return home while Oiwa and Rei continue to run the inn with the intent of moving spirits to the afterlife.
135	36	"Before Thinking About The Earth, Think About The More Endangered Gintaman's Future!"; Transliteration: "Chikyū no mae ni, motto abunai 'Gintaman' no mirai o kangaero" (Japanese: 地球の前に、もっと危ない「ギンタマン」の未来を考えろ)	December 4, 2008
A down on his luck editor of a JUMP comic series is getting negative feedback on his work so he decides to get a little more help on the subject from others.
136	37	"It's Your House, You Build It"; Transliteration: "Onore no ibasho wa onore de tsukuru mono nari" (Japanese: 己の居場所は己で作るものなり)	December 11, 2008
When Hasegawa gets a call from Hatsu about his better life, he has to find a house in two weeks or be guilt ridden forever. With help from Gintoki he looks for a house until one seems a little stranger than anything so far, just what is it about this house?
137	38	"99% Of Men Aren't Confident In Confessing Their Love"; Transliteration: "Kokuhaku ni jishin no aru otoko nante 99% inai" (Japanese: 告白に自信のある男なんて99%いない)	December 18, 2008
137	38	"People Who Don't Believe In Santa Are The Very Ones Who Want To Believe, You Contentious Bastard"; Transliteration: "Santa o shinjite inai hitobito wa, anata Basutādo wa, shinjitai yoi monodesu" (Japanese: サンタを信じていない人々は、あなた訟バスタードは、信じたい良いものです)	December 18, 2008
After so many attempts and failures, Sa-chan and Kondo try to play matchmaker to get the other's love for them to win a bet. In the second part, Gintoki meets Santa and Ben (his reindeer) as they reunite.
138	39	"Let's Talk About The Old Days Once In A While"; Transliteration: "Toki ni wa mukashi no hanashi o shiyō ka" (Japanese: 時には昔の話をしようか)	December 25, 2008
While cleaning the Yorozuya shop, Shinpachi and Kagura find a picture behind a sign depicting Gintoki with a beautiful woman. As they start to argue about who this woman could have been, Gintoki returns and starts to explain that she was the previous character of Catherine. Gintoki then reveals the other's previous characters: Shinpachi's was Kanemura, a muscular black man with a gun for a right arm; Sadaharu's was a man similar to Kanemura, and Kagura's was a muscular black woman. The final pictures imply Gintoki drowned his former companions, causing Shinpachi and Kagura to leave in disgust. Gintoki hides a picture of the current Odd Jobs behind the sign and prays for a good new year.
139	40	"Don't Put Your Wallet In Your Back Pocket"; Transliteration: "Saifu wa shiri poketto ni ireru na" (Japanese: 財布は尻ポケットに入れるな)	January 8, 2009
A thief tries to steal Gintoki's wallet in order to see a certain woman.
140	41	"Beware Of Those Who Use An Umbrella On A Sunny Day!"; Transliteration: "Hare no hi ni amagasa sasu yatsu niwa goyōjin" (Japanese: 晴れの日に雨傘さす奴には御用心)	January 15, 2009
Tsukuyo falsely kills Gintoki and the gang in order to allow them to escape, but standing in their way are the members of the Yato clan.
141	42	"Butting Into A Fight Is Dangerous"; Transliteration: "Kenka no yokoyari wa kiken" (Japanese: ケンカの横槍は危険)	January 22, 2009
Gintoki leaves Tsukuyo behind so she can discipline her subordinates.
142	43	"Life Is About Making Consecutive Decisions"; Transliteration: "Jinsei wa sentakushi no renzoku" (Japanese: 人生は選択肢の連続)	January 29, 2009
After Shinpachi is nearly killed by Abuto, Kagura has turned into a yato killing machine, showing no mercy to her opponent.
143	44	"Those Who Stand On Four Legs Are Beasts. Those Who Stand On Two Legs, Guts, And Glory Are Men"; Transliteration: "Yonhon ashi de tatsu no ga kemono, nihon ashi to iji to mie de tatsu no ga otoko" (Japanese: 四本足で立つのが獣二本足と意地と見栄で立つのが男)	February 5, 2009
Seita is taken to see Hinowa but finds out that she isn't actually his mother but despite not being blood related, they both accept each other. Gintoki challenges the Night King.
144	45	"Don't Trust Bedtime Stories"; Transliteration: "Nemonogatari wa shin'yō suruna" (Japanese: 寝物語は信用するな)	February 12, 2009
Tsukuyo comes to Gintoki's aid with his fight with Housen.
145	46	"The Color For Each Person's Bond Comes In Various Colors"; Transliteration: "Kizuna no iro wa jūnin toiro" (Japanese: 絆の色は十人十色)	February 19, 2009
Shinpachi, Kagura and Seita make their way to the control room while Gintoki fights Housen. Gintoki, Tsukuyo and other Hyakka rebels overwhelm Housen for a while. In the control room, Seita tries desperately to open the underground ceiling of Yoshiwara. The tide of the battle begins to turn in Housen's favour. In the control room, Seita succeeds in opening the ceiling. Thus, letting the sunlight into Yoshiwara. Exposure to sunlight, weakens Housen as Gintoki delivers the final blow. Housen reminisces about his memories with Hinowa.
146	47	"The Taste Of Drinking Under Broad Daylight Is Something Special"; Transliteration: "Hiruma ni nomu sake wa hitoaji chigau" (Japanese: 昼間に飲む酒は一味違う)	February 26, 2009
The conclusion of the Yoshiwara arc.
147	48	"All Adults Are Instructors For All Children"; Transliteration: "Subete no otonatachi wa subete no kodomotachi no insutorakutā" (Japanese: 全ての大人達は全ての子供達のインストラクター)	March 5, 2009
After the Yoshiwara incident, Shinpachi and Kagura wish to become stronger and want Gintoki to be their instructor.
148	49	"Zip Up Your Fly Nice And Slowly"; Transliteration: "Chakku wa yukkuri hikiagero" (Japanese: チャックはゆっくり引きあげろ)	March 12, 2009
Hijikata and Sougo from the Shinsengumi find themselves chained to each other in a strange place. After they remember how they got there, a mysterious man shows up in a TV. The man tells them that if they can't get the key, which unlocks their chains, in 72 hours the bomb which is located in the Shinsengumi headquarters will explode. He also says that if one of the two gets the key and frees oneself from the chain around their neck, the chain of the other one will explode.
149	50	"When Breaking A Chuubert In Half, The End With The Knob Should Be Better. It's Also Tasty To Drink From There"; Transliteration: "Chūpatto o futatsu ni wakeru toki wa, ano motsu toko aru yatsu no hō ga nanka ii, asoko kara nomu no mo otsu" (Japanese: チューパットを二つに分ける時はあの持つトコある奴の方がなんかイイ あそこから飲むのもオツ)	March 19, 2009
After several days in captivity, Hijikata and Sougo continue to search for a method to escape without killing one another. After Sougo sacrifices himself by using a saw and slicing his neck, Hijikata goes berserk and escapes from the room with him. However in the end it turns out that Sougo himself is the one behind the incident and the mysterious man is a friend of his. In the end, Sougo hints that he is willing to do the same thing with a certain curly silver-haired samurai.
150	51	"If You Can't Beat Them, Join Them"; Transliteration: "Nagai mono ni wa makarero!!" (Japanese: 長いものには巻かれろ!!)	March 26, 2009
The Yorozuya talk about the past years of the Gintama series and how they should end the final episode.
