= Prague (band) =

Japanese three-piece rock band

- Origin: Japan
- Genres: Rock
- Years active: 2006—present
- Labels: Ki/oon Records (Japan)
- Members: Yuta Suzuki; Kensuke Ito; Tsuguhito Konno
- Website: praguemusic.jp

Prague (プラハ, Puraha) is a Japanese three-piece rock band formed in 2006. In September 2009, they signed with Sony Music Japan's Ki/oon Records and made their major-label debut.

== Members ==
- Yuta Suzuki (鈴木 雄太, Suzuki Yuta) – vocals, guitar
  - Birthdate: April 20, 1986
- Kensuke Ito (伊藤 賢佑, Ito Kensuke) – drums
  - Birthdate: November 20, 1986
- Tsuguhito Konno (金野 倫仁, Konno Tsuguhito) – bass
  - Birthdate: May 27, 1986
  - Nickname: Konpi (こんぴー)

== Biography ==
The band first formed when all three members were attending the same music college. Suzuki and Ito, classmates since high school, were introduced to bassist Konno through a mutual friend, and in 2006 they began playing around Tokyo under the name Sound Coordination. In 2009, they signed with Ki/oon Records and released their first major-label single, Slow Down. The band's second single, Light Infection, was featured as the opening theme during Season 4 of the anime series Gin Tama. The band's fourth single, Balance Doll, was used as the eighteenth ending theme of the anime series Gin Tama.

== History ==
- 2006
  - Prague forms
- 2009
  - September 9 First single, Slow Down, released via Ki/oon Records
  - December 9 2nd single, Light Infection, released. Hits 25th on the Oricon charts.
  - December 29 Appear at the Countdown Japan 09/10 festival.
- 2010
  - Prague presents "Light Infection" Tour starts
  - May 12 3rd single, Distort, released
  - June 29 Special free concert Perspective at Shibuya Quattro
  - July 14 1st album Perspective released
  - July 27, August 31, September 28 Prague Monthly Sessions "Fire Fire Fire" concert series
  - August 7 Appear at the Rock in Japan Festival 2010
  - December 28 Appear at Countdown Japan 10/11 festival
- 2011
  - January 15 Volume 1 of Prague-Stream, the band's semi-regular Ustream concert series
  - May 26 Solo concert at Shimokitazawa Shelter

== Discography ==
=== Singles ===
- Slow Down – (September 9, 2009)
- Light Infection – (December 9, 2009)
- Distort – (May 12, 2010)
- Balance Doll – (August 10, 2011)
- Dasso no Season – (November 21, 2012)

=== Albums ===
- Perspective (July 14, 2010)
- Hanataba (March 11, 2011)
- Akegata no Metaphor (October 26, 2011)
