= List of Kodomo no Jikan characters =

The following is a list of characters from the Japanese manga series Kodomo no Jikan, written and illustrated by Kaworu Watashiya and published in Japan by Futabasha in the monthly seinen manga magazine Comic High!. As of January 2008, thirty-three chapters have been published since serialization began on May 22, 2005, of which twenty-eight have been collected in four bound volumes to date. At one point, an English language version of the manga was licensed for distribution in North America by Seven Seas Entertainment under the title Nymphet, but the Los Angeles–based company ultimately decided not to publish it due to controversies over its content. An anime adaptation of the series with twelve episodes aired on Japanese television between October 12, 2007 and December 28, 2007. Since the animated version only covers events from the first twenty chapters or so, is self-contained, and had an original ending, there exist significant differences in characterization between the manga and anime incarnations of the characters.

The main story revolves around newly graduated, twenty-three-year-old teacher Daisuke Aoki, who has just landed his first teaching job as an elementary school instructor at Futatsubashi Elementary School (双ツ橋小学校, Futatsubashi Shōgakkō). He is placed in charge of class 3-1, where one of his students, a mischievously precocious eight-year-old girl named Rin Kokonoe, develops an intense crush on him. Though he does his best to discourage her efforts, she nevertheless continues with her aggressive campaign to win his affections in spite of the problems that ensue that are her attempt to get closer to him. The situation is further complicated not only by the often complex, intertwining relationships existing between them and their respective friends, families, and peers, but also by the everyday life lessons they all learn together, as well as from each other.

== Major characters ==
=== Daisuke Aoki ===
Daisuke Aoki
- First appearance: Class Period 1 (manga); Class Period 1 (anime)
- Voiced by: Junji Majima (Japanese)

In-universe information
- Relatives: Chika Aoki (sister); Unnamed mother Unnamed father

Aoki Daisuke (青木 大介)

The bespectacled, good-natured homeroom teacher of 4-1 (originally 3-1) at Futatsubashi Elementary School and protagonist of the series. By his own accounts the product of a normal, uneventful childhood, Daisuke Aoki was an above average student and athlete in his youth and served as a substitute for members of the track and field club in university. While there, he fell in love with an unnamed female peer of his, but she married one of her seniors before he got a chance to confess his feelings to her. Aoki never harbored any resentment or negative emotions over this development, however, and was glad that she had found happiness with someone he believed to be a better man than himself.

After landing a position as a mid-trimester replacement for class 3-1 at Futatsubashi Elementary School, the freshly graduated, twenty-three-year-old Aoki quickly found several of the preconceived, idealistic notions he held about being an elementary school instructor put to the test by his first teaching job, literally from day one: his complete lack of previous experience as an educator left him poorly prepared for controlling or maintaining the interest of a classroom filled with unruly, disobedient students, inheriting a legacy of mistrust from the former teacher, Nakamura. Most significantly, he has to deal with the shameless flirtations of an eight-year-old determined to win his affections. His enthusiasm, positive-thinking, hands-on attitude, and emotional attachment to his students have made it difficult for him to maintain professional objectivity on occasion, often resulting in his butting heads with strict fellow teacher, Sae Shirai, whose distant, traditional teaching style is the polar opposite of his own. In his struggle to come to terms with the demands of his job and become a better educator, he has found an ally in his attractive coworker and direct senior, Kyōko Hōin, who has been an endless source of practical advice, teaching suggestions, and moral support.

Daisuke's lack of life experience has been his biggest obstacle as a teacher. While this fact has never discouraged his desire to help his students, it nevertheless complicates his efforts to grasp the hardships faced by some of them. His lack of experience with women has also rendered him far more vulnerable to Rin Kokonoe's sexual innuendo and Kuro's barbed remarks about his virginity than he otherwise might have been. His tendency to overthink and overanalyze things, obliviousness to female romantic interest, and his inability to read a person's mood have not proven beneficial, either, as evidenced by his ongoing attempts to start conversations or engage in discussions with Shirai in spite of her dislike for him.

From the moment they first met, Aoki's relationship with Rin Kokonoe has been a complex one. Though initially troubled by her actions and unrestrained affection for him, his attitude softened after learning that she was an orphan, and he has done his best to understand the reasons behind her unusual and outrageous behavior. Though they had developed a kind of affectionate working relationship — with Rin subtly using her influence over the other students to help him maintain classroom discipline, among other things — in a dramatic confrontation with her towards the end of his first school year, he was forced to acknowledge the existence of a strong attraction to her. While the initially undefinable nature of these feelings troubled him greatly, even after his reunion with Rin several months later, a chance comment by Mimi Usa led him to realize that he had developed a father's love for the girl (although he tends to have doubts whether this is what he really feels about her). This realization has increased his protectiveness of Rin and led him to become increasingly suspicious of the motives of her legal guardian, Reiji Kokonoe. When Rin and Reiji start to fall out, he decides to move in with them to keep them in check. However, he later moves out on the request of Shirai who saw him leave the house one night. In the end, Aoki comes to terms with his feelings and admits to himself that he does indeed have a romantic attraction to Rin. Though he has come to this resolution, he chooses to stick to his principles and decides that it is for the best to not confess to her and is fine with maintaining Rin's happiness until she is able to grow up and follow her own path, though it may lead to her eventually forgetting or moving on from their relationship and finding someone else. However, once Rin turns 16, she reunites with him and they finally start dating.

=== Rin Kokonoe ===
Rin Kokonoe
- First appearance: Class Period 1 (manga); Class Period 1 (anime)
- Voiced by: Eri Kitamura (Japanese)

In-universe information
- Relatives: Aki Kokonoe (mother, deceased); Roku Kamihara (father); Unnamed great uncle (deceased); Unnamed great aunt (deceased); Reiji Kokonoe (first cousin once removed)

Kokonoe Rin (九重 りん)

A mischievously precocious young girl in class 4-1 (originally 3-1) at Futatsubashi Elementary School. Born and raised by her single mother, Aki Kokonoe, for the first five years of her life, Rin Kokonoe was an affectionate, happy child. Though normally shy around strangers, she immediately warmed up to her first cousin once removed, Reiji Kokonoe, when he moved in with them after being orphaned, and accepted the relationship that developed between her mother and him. Her joy at finally having a complete family to call her own, however, was short-lived: Aki was diagnosed with lung cancer, and, while she tried to stay alive long enough to see her daughter enter first grade, died several months later. Rin, who had been folding paper cranes incessantly in the hopes that Aki would recover if she made enough of them, was at her mother's side during her last moments. The event was so traumatic that Rin became a silent and emotionless girl.

Rin, still in her stuporic state, entered Futatsubashi Elementary School, where she was grouped together with the two other "class misfits", Kuro Kagami and Mimi Usa, during a physical education class, which marked the beginning of their association. Though initially treated as a living doll by Kuro, the latter's attempt to remove one of Aki's homemade dresses triggered a reaction in Rin for the first time. Over the next two years, Rin's personality and reputation experienced a dramatic shift: she went from being silent and emotionless to the rebellious, de facto leader of her class who would not hesitate to stand up to adults by using her intelligence and exploiting her status as an "innocent" minor to outsmart and outmaneuver them. The bond between the three girls grew so intimate over time, in fact, that each became willing to do anything to help, protect, or defend the other two without hesitation. Such was the case when the original teacher of class 3-1, Nakamura, bullied Mimi until she decided to stay home from school. Rin, in turn, harassed Nakamura until he had a nervous breakdown and resigned his post.

Rin developed a crush on Nakamura's successor, Daisuke Aoki, on the first day they met, even proclaiming herself his girlfriend almost immediately after discovering he was single. However, she remained mistrustful of him, as she had become with all adults, and did not hesitate to coerce him into keeping silent about her involvement in his predecessor's fate. When a series of unrelated events, such as Aoki's persuading Mimi to return to class and treating the stray cat Nyaa with kindness, began silently attesting to his kindness and sincerity, however, Rin's attitude towards him began to soften. And, as it became to her apparent over time that his feelings for and dedication to her were unshakable — unaffected by the dark side of her he had seen or her sometimes questionable treatment of him and not borne of pity or her resemblance to someone he once cared for — what had started out as a simple crush blossomed into genuine love. As might be expected of a child of her age, Rin displayed her affection for Aoki mostly through merciless teasing, though her flirtatious nature and vast carnal knowledge invariably resulted in her antics bordering on sexual harassment. Her subsequent discovery that Kyōko Hōin was attracted to him as well, however, slowly drove Rin to commit increasingly desperate acts, which, following a failed attempt to confess her feelings to him, culminated in an emotionally charged confrontation that left her frustrated and depressed, Aoki questioning the exact nature of his feelings for her, and the development of a rift between the two of them that would persist for months.

Taking her "love rival", Hōin's, advice on how to get someone to like her to heart, Rin decided to try and earn Aoki's love with kindness instead of trying to take it by force. This change in strategy was part of what motivated her to volunteer for the position of class representative at the beginning of the next school year, a position which would both allow her to use her influence over the other students to facilitate his job as a teacher and make sure her peers could make themselves heard. While her faith in and dedication to him are such that she has been willing to push herself beyond her limits, even to the potential detriment of her own health, it has been revealed that two other, more sinister elements have served as the driving forces behind her actions. The first is Rin's awareness of Reiji's increasingly unhealthy obsession with her, which has left her in the uncomfortable position of balancing her platonic love for him as a father figure, her romantic love for Aoki, and her desire to respect her mother's memory and relationship with Reiji. The second is Rin's fear of her own dark nature — the part of her that tormented Nakamura, twice led her to blackmail Aoki with false charges of sexual molestation, and came close to seriously injuring her rival for Aoki's affection, Hōin — and that she will be consumed by her inner demons, something which she has slowly started to open up to Aoki about following their reconciliation.

=== Kuro Kagami ===
Kuro Kagami
- First appearance: Class Period 1 (manga); Class Period 1 (anime)
- Voiced by: Kei Shindō (Japanese)

In-universe information
- Relatives: Unnamed mother Unnamed grandmother

Kagami Kuro (鏡 黒)

The short-tempered, diminutive classmate of Rin Kokonoe and Mimi Usa's at Futatsubashi Elementary School, who has been close friends with both of them since they were in first grade. Originally the stereotypical spoiled rich kid — egotistical, possessed of a superiority complex, and quick to mock, judge, and deride others — her involvement with Mimi and Rin began after the three of them, the "class misfits", grouped together for physical education class, during which the former two of them discovered that the latter's mute, detached state was the result of trauma from her mother's death. Initially, Kuro's "friendship" with Rin was rather warped, as she viewed the latter as little more than her personal plaything, applying things such as makeup and nail polish to her as if she were a living doll (and getting into trouble for it). However, it was during an attempted "dress up" session that Kuro had her arguably greatest impact on her friend's life: her attempt to remove a dress that Aki had made by hand for Rin prompted the latter to emerge from her stupor for the first time to protest the action, marking the beginning of her long journey on the road to eventual recovery.

While Kuro's attitude improved somewhat in the ensuing years, her friendship with Rin changed dramatically: the admiration and respect she developed for the strength of character that emerged in her friend eventually gave rise to an intimate attraction. In spite of this, she remains fiercely loyal and protective of Rin, a courtesy she extends to any individuals she considers her friends.

One quality of hers that has not changed in the intervening years, however, is her obsession with following the latest, expensive fashion trends, a vice which the wealth of the Kagami family, combined with her only child status and a loving yet overworked and absent mother, has allowed her to indulge in to no end. She often wears clothing in the Lolita style, sometimes combined with nekomimi ears and tail, and has claimed in the past that she purposely chose to attend a public school because of the restrictions on her wardrobe a private one's dress code would have imposed upon her.

Though Kuro frequently serves as Rin "partner in crime" due to their comparable levels of sexual knowledge and mutual disdain for authority figures and adults in general, their opinions differ radically when it comes to Daisuke Aoki. The open contempt she shows for him stems from the erroneous notion that he is a phony, i.e. that any praise he offers or concern for the happiness and well-being of his students he demonstrates is part of either an attempt to flatter kids into his authority or a facetious prerequisite of his job as an educator. That she also believes him to be both incompetent and naïve as well as a pervert, lolicon, and rival for Rin's affection have not helped matters any, and she has become determined to never let him live down the fact that he is a virgin once she learns of it. On the other hand, she has come to idolize Sae Shirai, viewing her strict, no-nonsense attitude towards children as evidence of sincerity, and has managed to cultivate a genuine friendship with her, albeit not without encountering a few bumps along the way.

Kuro's growing concerns over changes in Rin's pattern of behavior led to a dramatic confrontation between her and Aoki during which she, without betraying any confidences, stated in no uncertain terms her belief that he cannot banish her friend's demons simply because he is incapable of providing her with the romantic love she wants from him. Though heartbroken by Rin's decision in choosing him over her, Kuro has tried putting some of her animosity towards Aoki aside — or at least as much of it as she can stand to — for the sake of her friend.

Her mother divorced her father after he cheated on her. This is the reason for Kuro's general distrust of men.

=== Mimi Usa ===
Mimi Usa
- First appearance: Class Period 1 (manga); Class Period 1 (anime)
- Voiced by: Mai Kadowaki(Japanese)

In-universe information
- Relatives: Unnamed father Unnamed mother Unnamed older brother

Usa Mimi (宇佐 美々)

The studious, bespectacled classmate of Rin Kokonoe and Kuro Kagami's in class 4-1 (originally 3-1) at Futatsubashi Elementary School, who has been close friends with both of them since they were in first grade. Quiet and shy by nature, Mimi Usa's reluctance to speak her mind was initially mistaken for aloofness by her classmates, resulting in their distancing themselves from her through no real fault of her own. This eventually led to her being grouped together with the two other "class outcasts," Kuro and Rin, during a physical education class, an episode which marked the beginning of a mutual association that would ultimately give rise to an intimate friendship.

Despite being the tallest, smartest, and most physically developed of the three girls, Mimi's knowledge of adult and sexual matters is, ironically, inversely proportional to her level of dominance in these areas: an astonishing degree of her childhood innocence has managed to survive her friendship with Rin and Kuro intact, and the clash of her wide-eyed naïveté with the sheer volume of sexual innuendo she is constantly bombarded with, intentionally or unintentionally, often results in confusion, shock, misinterpretation, embarrassment, or some combination of all four. While Daisuke Aoki has done his best to protect Mimi's purity of mind from Rin and Kuro's impromptu "sexual education" lessons, even her two best friends have, on occasion, stepped in to shield her from some of the world's seedier realities, such as lolicons, sexual harassment, lewd commentary, and underwear fetishes. Aoki, over time, has become something resembling a second father figure when it comes to Usa, and Usa has taken his support to heart and has a great deal of trust in him.

Mimi's biggest problem, however, comes in the form of her struggle to find her own voice and establish a sense of self-identity. While her shyness, lack of assertiveness, and reluctance to stand up for herself make her a prime target for teasing and bullying, her father was always there to defend her until a work transfer necessitated his living far away from his family, resulting in the loss of one of her few outlets for making herself heard. Her mother's preoccupation and preference with Mimi's older brother, with whom she does not get along, and her indifference (or at least inconsideration) towards Mimi have made things worse, as she has often found herself standing alone in the face of such challenges as dealing with the verbal abuse of her old homeroom teacher, Nakamura, and purchasing her first bra on her own after suffering much physical and social discomfort. Her mother's preference for her son over her daughter leads to neglectful abuse; when Mimi tells her about being approached by a molester, she shows no concern and even tells Mimi it was her own fault, and changes topic suggesting that she stop going to cram school and settle for going to a public school like her older brother. While Rin, Kuro, and Aoki have been quick to rise to her protection and are unyielding in their emotional and moral support, since most of Mimi's defining characteristics emphasize qualities about herself with which she is either uncomfortable or that make her stand out — such as her intelligence, height, lack of aptitude when it comes to sports and related activities, and unusually generous physical endowment for a third grader — she has become incredibly self-conscious, emotionally fragile, and increasingly depressed over time. Aoki even posed as her brother so that she could go to a photo shoot for a magazine, a rather ambitious step for her. Her picture was published but it seems that no one has yet noticed that Mimi is the girl in the photo. Even Kuro was not able to recognize her friend when she saw her in the streets with Aoki the night of her photo shoot.

Having fallen in love with Rin's cousin, Reiji Kokonoe, at first sight, Mimi received a significant boost in morale when he, recognizing much of who he once was in her, advised her to never lose hope that she would one day find someone who would understand and love her and encouraged her to not succumb to anger and hatred at the world like he did. Though prompted by Rin a short time later into revealing her secret crush on him — which Mimi tearfully did in spite of her fear about adversely affecting their relationship — she was surprised when her friend gave her permission to follow her heart with her blessing. Despite her deep feelings for Reiji, however, Mimi is far from blind: she has noticed subtle signs of his unusual emotional attachment to Rin, and an earlier incident — during which she saw Rin in an uncharacteristically vulnerable, emotionally distraught state just before the two of them shared an unusual moment of non-sexual physical intimacy — have raised her concerns about her friend's continued well-being.

=== Kyōko Hōin ===
Kyōko Hōin
- First appearance: Class Period 1 (manga); Class Period 1 (anime)
- Voiced by: Ryōko Tanaka(Japanese)

In-universe information
- Relatives: Yuki Hōin (brother)

Hōin Kyōko (宝院 京子)

The young, attractive homeroom teacher of class 4-2 (originally 3-2) at Futatsubashi Elementary School. Little is known about her past, except for the fact that she grew up with only her mother and her younger brother, and has been single since her previous boyfriend dumped her after issuing her an ultimatum: choose between her new teaching assignment or him. One of the first friends Daisuke Aoki made after beginning his new job as well as his direct senior, the friendly, busty, fun-loving Hōin has done her best from the outset to help him out by both offering guidance and advice as well as being his confidante. Though initially amused by the wide-eyed enthusiasm and naïveté with which he approached his job, Aoki's good nature and sincerity slowly grew on her and she developed a fierce crush on him, an attraction that was not diminished in the slightest by her later, accidental discovery that he is a virgin. Though she has made numerous attempts to initiate a romantic relationship with him, a combination of awkward timing and plain old bad luck combined with his uncanny inability to read people's moods and seeming obliviousness to her interest have thus far foiled her attempts, and she has avoided being straightforward about it due to the awkwardness of his being a colleague. Nevertheless, she remains firm in her resolve to keep trying until she succeeds. She is a bit more forward whilst drunk, managing to kiss Aoki whilst he was a sleep. The second time she tries this however, she ends up kissing his sister, Chika.

Hōin's problems with her own class mirror Aoki's own: she has had to deal with her own fair share of gropers, inappropriate remarks directed at her, and children bringing erotic manga to school. Her busty figure had given her the nicknames 'Boin-sensei' ('boin' being a perverse name for breasts) and 'Doin-sensei' (from the sound her stomach fat makes when she begins gaining weight) from her class. Her choice to wear a jumpsuit was, in fact, prompted by her students continuously tugging at her clothing and flipping up her skirt. In spite of all this, her students remain highly protective of her and once angrily banded together to drive Aoki away when they were under the mistaken impression that he was mistreating her.

Though her teaching style is the polar opposite of Sae Shirai's and it has led to (mostly unspoken) differences in opinion on occasion and once made her question whether her most casual style of dressing was detracting from her physical appeal or ability to be taken seriously. Hōin's relationship with her colleague has shown signs of evolving into something resembling friendship. Though she initially used her then-recently acquired knowledge that Shirai was the daughter of the board of education to manipulate her into cosplaying during the school's athletic meet while serving as one of the event's coordinators, Hōin later took advantage of that fact to help her get out of attending a teacher's workshop the principal was insisting she participate in. Shirai subsequently returned the favor by helping her deal with the belligerent mother in charge of the local parent-teacher association that had been causing her much grief and aggravation.

=== Reiji Kokonoe ===
Reiji Kokonoe
- First appearance: Class Period 5 (manga); Class Period 2 (anime)
- Voiced by: Tomokazu Sugita (adult Japanese); Natsuki Mori (child Japanese)

In-universe information
- Relatives: Unnamed father Unnamed mother Aki Kokonoe (cousin, deceased); Rin Kokonoe (first cousin once removed)

Kokonoe Reiji (九重レイジ)

Rin Kokonoe's first cousin once removed and legal guardian. The unfortunate product of a dysfunctional home, Reiji Kokonoe grew up without ever receiving any kind of praise from his short-tempered, adulterous alcoholic of a father in spite of his achievements, academic or otherwise. Both he and his mother were often on the receiving end of the father's mean-spirited criticism and vitriol. While he initially believed that his mother's reluctance to leave with him to begin a new life elsewhere and willingness to endure all the verbal and psychological abuse was for his sake, he eventually learned that she was doing it in order to ensure her own continued security and well-being, not his. In that moment, the lifetime of adoration and sympathy he held for his quiet, kind, long-suffering mother curdled into hatred, and he slowly began treating her with the same contempt his father did. Having grown angry and resentful at the world and everyone around him, Reiji began skipping school and locking himself in his room. His hatred for his parents grew so great that, when a freak traffic accident left him an orphan while he was still in high school, he did not shed a single tear for them.

Having grown alienated from his extended family due to circumstances surrounding his parents' deaths, Reiji traveled to Tokyo to live with the other black sheep of the Kokonoe family, his older cousin Aki, and her illegitimate daughter, Rin. Though initially just as cynical towards and mistrustful of her as he had become towards all adults, he was literally moved to tears upon learning that she had chosen to live her life as an outcast rather than have an abortion. Seeing in her the loving mother he always wished he had had, it is perhaps unsurprising that Aki's gentle, quirky nature and visible affection for her child eventually won Reiji over and he fell in love with her. Though still in high school, Reiji worked hard, and after securing a position at an accounting firm, confessed his feelings. While initially reluctant to return his feelings due to their age difference and status as cousins, Aki eventually entered into a relationship with him that was, by all appearances, a happy one. Despite the fact that she never quite managed to help him completely let go of the anger and hatred within him, Reiji's newfound family succeeded in silencing his inner demons and he finally found some measure of peace in his troubled life, one which, unfortunately, was not to last.

Though fiercely driven by his determination to provide for and protect his new family, with money being no object, Reiji did not learn of Aki's advanced stage of lung cancer until well after it was diagnosed. Though he managed to convince her to accept treatment in spite of her concerns over their finances, when she showed no signs of improvement after two months, he respected her wish to return home in spite of the knowledge that doing so was a death sentence. While it was hoped that she would remain alive long enough to see her daughter enter grade school, Aki succumbed to her illness well before then and died. It was Reiji who discovered her lifeless body after returning home from work one day, with a visibly traumatized Rin still diligently waiting by her side.

In the years that followed, Reiji continued to look after Rin, with whom he shared a special bond from almost the outset, as if she were his own daughter. In spite of her frequent objections about needlessly wasting money, he has done his best to give her with everything he had always hoped he could provide for her mother but never had a chance to. His over protectiveness of her has led him to, among other things, encourage her to wear less revealing, more conservative clothing and become extremely wary of any males in her life other than him. This has led, among other things, to the development of a rivalry of sorts between him and Daisuke Aoki, of whom he has grown increasingly suspicious and mistrustful, over Rin's affections.

Recently, Reiji's dedication to Rin has taken a more sinister turn: plagued by nightmares, still wrestling with the anger and hatred from his traumatic childhood, and unable to fully cope with his lover's death, he has begun showing signs of projecting his feelings for Aki onto her daughter and subtly grooming her to take her mother's place when she comes of age. Though he appears to be aware of his inner darkness to a certain extent — at least enough to encourage Mimi Usa to never lose hope and succumb to her inner demons as he did to his — it remains to be seen if Reiji will eventually succeed in dispelling his delusion that Rin is his only chance at salvation, redemption, and a normal life, or whether it will one day consume him utterly and end up destroying them both. There is some general signs that he might have an attraction towards Mimi Usa-chan. Aoki's efforts in reforming Reiji have been successful so far and Reiji has thus been able to control his obsession and has caused him to trust Aoki much more (though he is unable to admit it). In the final chapter, he is finally able to move on with his life and instead finds a new love with Usa whom he decides to marry and have a child with when she becomes old enough, showing him finally being able to pursue a much better life than before.

=== Sae Shirai ===
Sae Shirai
- First appearance: Class Period 6 (manga); Class Period 1 (anime)
- Voiced by: Yōko Sōmi (Japanese)

In-universe information
- Relatives: Unnamed father Unnamed mother

Shirai Sae (白井 沙江)

A strict, by-the-book, bespectacled instructor at Futatsubashi Elementary School, who has gained a reputation as a fearsome authoritarian figure among students and staff alike. As the daughter of two teachers — one of whom has since gone on to become the chief of the board of education — it might come as little surprise that Sae Shirai would become one herself were it not for the fact that she hates children and eschews social interaction. Quiet and studious in her youth, Shirai's years of exposure to her mother's endless criticism combined with being written off as gloomy, serious, and plain by her peers without a second thought caused her to become embittered, asocial, and resentful of the world. Not only did this result in her adopting a highly disciplined, traditional, no-nonsense teaching style — one which clashes horribly with the enthusiastic, positive-thinking approach of Daisuke Aoki and causes them to butt heads on just about every topic imaginable — it all but eliminated any semblance of a social life as she has neither had sexual relations nor even dated anyone despite being nearly thirty years old, the former of which remains a tremendous bone of contention for her.

After exploding at Kuro Kagami for mocking Aoki for being a virgin (unintentionally betraying her own status as one to him in the process), Shirai was completely taken aback when the young girl approached her a short time later, offering her not only fashion tips and suggestions on improving her appearance but also professing great interest in being her friend by dubbing her "Shiro-chan". Though annoyed by the sudden, newfound, and unwanted attention she was receiving, she nevertheless remained remarkably tolerant of it and restrained by her standards. When asked for advice by Kuro on what the best approach for dealing with her unrequited love for Rin would be, Shirai hurt the young girl's feelings by unintentionally implying that her lesbian attraction was somehow less than normal. Only later, following a series of unrelated events in her own personal life, did she realize the full extent of what she had inadvertently done and what a poor judge of normalcy she, of all people, was.

Seeking to make amends by wearing a white hairpin previously given to her as a gift by Kuro, Shirai was privately flattered when her admirer demonstrated her acceptance of the apologetic gesture by beating up a male student who made a disparaging remark about her appearance, the event marking something of a turning point for her. Though hardly transformed into a social animal by the experience, Shirai has shown signs of softening somewhat, once to the extent where she broke her own rules concerning physical contact between students and teachers by offering a comforting hug to a heartbroken Kuro at an athletic meet. She has also recently started rethinking certain aspects of her life — most notably how much she has become like the mother she so loathes — and repaid Hōin's favor of getting her out of a teacher's workshop by helping her deal with the belligerent mother in charge of the local parent-teacher association, achieving some closure and inner peace of her own in the process.

=== Aki Kokonoe ===
Aki Kokonoe
- First appearance: Class Period 11 (manga); Class Period 1 (anime)
- Voiced by: Yuri Amano (Japanese)

In-universe information
- Relatives: Rin Kokonoe (daughter); Unnamed uncle (deceased); Unnamed aunt (deceased); Reiji Kokonoe (cousin)

Kokonoe Aki (九重 秋)

Rin's late mother and Reiji's older cousin. Abandoned by her boyfriend when she became pregnant and refused to have an abortion, Aki Kokonoe chose to carry her child to term and undertake the difficult task of raising her young daughter on her own. Despite the fact that her decision to become a single mother had turned her into the black sheep of the family, the kind-hearted Aki never harbored any resentment towards them or her child's father, believing it better to forgive and forget than risk living a life consumed by anger and hatred.

When Rin was five years old, Aki welcomed her then-recently orphaned younger cousin, Reiji, into her home with open arms. Though initially just as cynical towards and mistrustful of her as he had become towards all adults, her gentle, quirky nature and visible affection for her child soon won him over, so much so, in fact, that he fell in love with her. Though initially reluctant to return his feelings due to their age difference (13 years older than Reiji) and status as cousins, she eventually entered into a relationship with him that was, by all appearances, a happy one, and the three of them became a family.

A short time later, however, Aki was diagnosed with Stage 2 lung cancer during what was supposed to be a routine medical exam, an illness that was later on revealed to have been complicated further by Rin's birth, which was the entire reason why she was pushed by her boyfriend to abort Rin in the first place. Upon learning that the amount of money needed to keep her alive for several months could be used to provide for Rin for many years to come, she decided to make the second great sacrifice of her life for the sake of her child by foregoing treatment in order to be able to financially support her daughter and kept her illness secret from everyone for some time. When her situation finally became known to Reiji and she conceded to treatment in light of the ability to financially contribute to their household he had since gained, her cancer proved to be far too aggressive and advanced to deal with. After two months with no improvement, Aki's request that she be allowed to go home was granted. While she hoped she could stay alive long enough to see Rin enter grade school, Aki succumbed to her illness well before then and died, her daughter having remained at her side until the very end.

Though she died more than two years before the opening of the series, Aki remains very much alive in the hearts of Reiji and Rin, whose memories of her continue to influence their lives and shape their actions, for better or worse.

== Minor characters ==
=== Nakamura ===
Nakamura
- First appearance: Class Period 1 (manga & anime)

Nakamura (中村)

The original homeroom teacher for grade three, class one at Futatsubashi Elementary School and Daisuke Aoki's direct predecessor, about whom not much has been revealed. While he managed to maintain a far greater degree of control, discipline, and order in his classroom than his successor, he lacked the latter's good nature. Nakamura's severe, open, verbal and emotional abuse of Mimi Usa in front of the other students during class was directly responsible for the latter's decision to quit school in order to protect herself, something which so outraged Rin Kokonoe that she retaliated by scribbling an unending stream of hateful and abusive messages in his workbooks which mirrored his own hurtful remarks to her friend. His inability to resolve the issue by convincing Mimi to return combined with Rin's personal vendetta against him caused his mental and physical health to deteriorate to the point where he finally decided to quit his position.

=== Nyaa ===
Nyaa
- First appearance: Class Period 2 (manga); Class Period 1 (anime)

Nyaa (ニャー)

A black and white stray tomcat whom Rin Kokonoe started looking after he wandered onto the Futatsubashi Elementary School grounds, emaciated and starving, at around the time of Daisuke Aoki's initial arrival. Having apparently suffered abuse at the hands of humans before, he is extremely mistrustful of them — as evidenced by his reaction towards Daisuke Aoki — and Rin has gone out of her way to prove to him that not all people are bad.

Though Aoki assumed responsibility for taking care of him during summer vacation, Nyaa had not warmed up to him at all in the interim and was still, quite literally, biting the hand that fed him.

=== Kenta Oyajima ===
Kenta Oyajima
- First appearance: Class Period 5 (manga); Class Period 1 (anime)
- Voiced by: Yūichi Ishigami (Japanese)

Oyajima Kenta (小矢島 剣太)

An older male teacher at Futatsubashi Elementary School. Oyajima has an easygoing outlook on life and teaching and frequently dispenses advice and words of wisdom to his younger, more easily excitable colleagues. Rarely flustered, he is the senior of Sae Shirai and has a visible soft spot for her, often offering insight to Hōin concerning their mutual colleague's behavior, background, and mindset in his usual, laidback style without coming off as defensive or biased. His good working relationship with Shirai also allows him to present her with alternative points of view or make thought-provoking observational comments in a gentle, nonconfrontational manner without either one of them getting worked up in the process. He later confesses to Shirai, though as she is currently unable to accept his feelings, he settles with a promise that, once a day, they will talk about something unrelated to school work.

The anime incarnation of Oyajima has stated that he is a first grade teacher, though he has not specified which class. Also it is stated that he has a daughter who has recently become a pet owner.

=== Chuck ===
Chuck
- First appearance: Class Period 13 (manga); Class Period 5 (anime)

Chakku (チャック)

Rin Kokonoe's giant teddy bear, whom she has had since she was a little girl. Though not alive, he nevertheless is important, having served as, among other things, a stand-in for Daisuke Aoki for Rin to practice her seduction and kissing techniques on and a strategically placed prop in a naughty photo she sent to him as a Christmas present using her cell phone.

In a non-canonical context, Chuck is something of an unofficial mascot for the series: he appears on splash pages and standalone illustrations in the manga and has made cameos in the eyecatches and animated censorship panels in the anime.

=== Nogita ===
Nogita
- First appearance: Class Period 18 (manga); Class Period 8 (anime)
- Voiced by: Tomo Shigematsu (Japanese)

Nogita (野木田)

A short-haired, bespectacled woman who was Rin Kokonoe, Kuro Kagami, and Mimi Usa's original homeroom teacher in class 1-1 when they first began attending Futatsubashi Elementary School two years before the opening of the series. Though she often had her hands full dealing with the three girls' antics, she was visibly relieved and moved with joy when Rin, as a benevolent, albeit unexpected, result of Kuro's attempt at playing "dress-up", finally emerged from the stuporic state she had been in since her mother's death and began speaking to and interacting with others.

Though seen only briefly in flashbacks in the manga in Class Period 18, and Chapter 60, Nogita made a somewhat more prominent appearance in the anime episode equivalent to that chapter, Class Period 8: Hug Me Tightly, where she was first referred to by name. There, she was revealed to have been an extremely diligent instructor who was close to her students and had been a teacher at Futatsubashi Elementary School until the previous year, having apparently retired after getting married onstage in a glamorous wedding. She was something of a rival for Sae Shirai, with whom she disagreed with on many issues, and offered some friendly advice and encouragement to her successor, Daisuke Aoki, in regards to appropriate levels of physical contact between teachers and students.

=== Chika Aoki ===
Chika Aoki
- First appearance: Class Period 55 (manga)

In-universe information
- Relatives: Daisuke Aoki (brother), unnamed mother, unnamed father

Aoki Chika (青木 智花)

Chika is Daisuke's younger sister, who resides in his hometown as a kindergarten teacher. Her personality is a direct contrast to Daisuke's, being very outgoing and social as opposed to his timid and quiet demeanor. She generally likes to tease her older brother, but is generally kind to the other girls, if a little forceful whilst fitting Mimi with a tampon. She is rather protective of Daisuke, so she is initially hostile towards Kyōko. She later gets along with her, at least until one night when they both got drunk and Kyōko kisses Chika thinking she was Daisuke.

== See also ==
- List of Kodomo no Jikan chapters
- List of Kodomo no Jikan episodes
