= List of Kodomo no Jikan episodes =

Kodomo no Jikan DVD volume 1 cover

This is a list of episodes of the Japanese anime Kodomo no Jikan. The episodes are directed by Eiji Suganuma and produced by the Japanese animation studio Studio Barcelona. The anime is based on the manga of the same name written and illustrated by Kaworu Watashiya. The story follows a grade school teacher named Daisuke Aoki whose main problem is that one of his students, Rin Kokonoe, has a crush on him. A thirty-minute, uncensored, single-episode original video animation was released on September 12, 2007, available both on the anime's official website and in a limited-edition version bundled with the fourth volume of the manga. The televised broadcast contained twelve episodes and aired between October 12, 2007, and December 27, 2007, on the KBS Kyoto Japanese television network. However, some of its content suffered censorship from animated panels, with some obscuring parts of the screen and using sound effects to "bleep" out dialogue in some instances, and others fully suppressing both audio and video. The uncensored version of the anime series were made available on DVD in six volumes containing two episodes each. The first such collection was released on December 21, 2007, with future releases to follow in one month intervals, ending on May 23, 2008. A second season consisting of four episodes, titled Kodomo no Jikan: Ni Gakki, was released exclusively on DVD between January 21, 2009, and July 24, 2009. Another OVA was released on January 23, 2011.

Four pieces of theme music are used for the anime television series; one opening theme and three ending themes. The opening theme, used for all but episode twelve, which did not have an opening theme, is "Rettsu! Ohime-sama Dakko" (れっつ!おひめさまだっこ) by Eri Kitamura, Kei Shindō, and Mai Kadowaki. The first ending theme, used for all but two episodes, is "Hanamaru Sensation" (ハナマル☆センセイション, Hanamaru☆Senseishon) by Little Non; the second ending theme, used only for episode six, is "Yasashii" (やさしい) by Chata; the final ending theme, used only in episode twelve, is "Otome Chikku Shoshinsha desu" (オトメチック初心者でーす) by the same three who sing the OVA's opening theme. The OVA's ending theme is "Aijō◎Education" (愛情◎エデュケイション), by Little Non. The second season OVA's opening theme is "Guilty Future" by Eri Kitamura. The second season's ending is "1, 2, 3 Day" by Little Non; except for episode three, whose ending theme is "Yoridori Princess" by Eri Kitamura, Kei Shindō, and Mai Kadowaki. In the 2011 OVA, "Rettsu! Ohime-sama Dakko" is used as the opening theme while "1, 2, 3 Day" is used as the ending theme.

== Season 1 ==
=== Pilot OVA Pre-Midquel ===
Title	Original release date
"Recess Time '~The Thing You Gave to Me~'" Transliteration: "Yasumi Jikan '~Anata ga Watashi ni Kureta Mono~'" (Japanese: やすみじかん「〜あなたがわたしにくれたもの〜」)	September 12, 2007
Rin, Kuro, and Mimi spend the day at various shops searching for a birthday present for Aoki and even buy a book of charms. However, after Rin runs out of money, they decide to stay over at her house for the night to make presents for him instead. There Mimi meets Reiji for the first time and falls in love with him. Kuro makes a voodoo doll of Aoki and Rin makes herself as the present. The next day, they go to school to give Aoki his presents. Chronologically, this OVA takes place between the 4th and 5th episodes of the first season.

=== First series ===
No.	Title	Original release date
1	"A Friendly Step"; Transliteration: "Nakayoshi no Ippo" (Japanese: なかよしのいっぽ)	October 12, 2007
It is the first day of teaching for Daisuke Aoki and his third grade class. During the course of the day, he learns about the reasons behind Mimi Usa's extended absence from school. Her absence is due to a long-term harassment by the previous teacher. Neither the other teachers nor her parents believed her, so Mimi's only choice was to quit school. This enraged Rin and Kuro, so they harassed that teacher to the point of causing the teacher to have a nervous breakdown during class and quit. Later, Rin tells Aoki that she hates adults because of that incident.
2	"A Smiling Reward"; Transliteration: "Nikoniko no Gohōbi" (Japanese: にこにこのごほうび)	October 18, 2007
Aoki starts off by assigning an essay about dreams, but the class responds with pessimistic views towards today's issues. At night, Aoki goes to a bar and rambles to his colleagues about how hard it is being a teacher. When they ask if there are any sexy teachers, Aoki accidentally mentions Rin. His colleagues tell him to move on to her, unaware of who Rin really is. The next day, it becomes apparent that Aoki's students' scores have begun to drop. Since Rin scored low on her test, Aoki asks her to come to a private lesson.
3	"Rapid Upbringing"; Transliteration: "Sukusuku Sodate" (Japanese: すくすくそだて)	October 26, 2007
During PE class, Aoki notices Mimi's large chest. He starts thinking of a way to deal with it, and in the process, makes Hoin think that he's a lolicon. Later, Mimi goes shopping for a bra, but does not know anything about them, and ends up buying a bra that didn't fit her. Two boys at school make fun of her, so Rin and Kuro help Mimi purchase a bra by taking her measurements at Kuro's private clothing department.
4	"My Mother"; Transliteration: "Watashi no O-kaa-san" (Japanese: わたしのおかあさん)	November 2, 2007
Aoki gives all of his students a home visit notification. After talking with Shirai, Aoki's curiosity about his students leads him to the archives where he learns about Rin's mother. Aoki begins to treat Rin with a lot of care, however when he hands out the home visit cancellations, he slips up about Rin's mother, which causes Rin to become depressed for being treated like a fool. After Aoki visits Rin's house and talks with Reiji, he mends his relationship with Rin by telling her that she is important to him.
5	"A Summer Vacation Friend"; Transliteration: "Natsuyasumi no Tomo" (Japanese: なつやすみのとも)	November 9, 2007
Summer break is quickly approaching, and Rin becomes saddened by the fact that she won't be able to see Aoki. Aoki tells her that he will still be at school to monitor the pool. Rin spends her summer with Kuro and Mimi, but at one point she is alone due to Kuro and Mimi's family-related absences. Rin remembers what Aoki says and goes to the school where she finds Aoki talking with Hoin. Aoki spots Rin and chases her to the pool where Rin pushes him in. She hugs him and they watch the fireworks.
6	"Memories"; Transliteration: "Omoide" (Japanese: おもいで)	November 16, 2007
A flash back is told of Reiji's parents and Rin's mother. Reiji's father was an alcoholic and got angry over minor things; one night his parents got in a car crash and died. Afterwards, Reiji moved in with his cousin Aki, Rin's mother, who had lung cancer, but did not tell anyone until it was too late.
7	"Outdoor School"; Transliteration: "Rinkan Gakkō" (Japanese: りんかんがっこう)	November 23, 2007
Rin and her classmates all went on a class outing to the mountains. While staying there, they play mischievous pranks on Aoki. The episode ends off when as the class were about to leave, Kyoko went to wake them up, finding the three of them, Rin, Kuro and Mimi, fell asleep with Aoki under a tree. Apparently. Aoki's pants were soiled, actually due to Rin's saliva, but the three of them made it look as though he ejaculated on his pants.
8	"Hold Me Tight"; Transliteration: "Dakkoshite Gyu" (Japanese: だっこしてぎゅっ)	November 30, 2007
Aoki tries to ignore Rin when she harasses him for attention. This was because "males and females should avoid skin contact", as emphasized by a fellow teaching staff. On the same day, a former teacher who taught at the school is coming back for a visit. She was the teacher that taught Rin when she was in Grade 1. She mentions Rin and tells Aoki that 'some children will feel lonely'. Later on Rin tries to crossdress as a boy to try to get skin contact with Aoki. The episode ends when Aoki discovers that Rin was cross-dressing as a male in order to try to get close to him. As such, Aoki apologizes to Rin and tells Rin to punish him whatever she desires. Rin in turn slaps him but later on hugs him, crying and tells him that she does not want him to ignore her.
9	"Jealousy Drill"; Transliteration: "Yakimochi Doriru" (Japanese: やきもちドリル)	December 6, 2007
Aoki decides to be more strict with the students after a fellow teacher commented on his relaxed manner of teaching on the students. Rin knew about it and was not happy about that. It is revealed that Rin was apparently jealous that Aoki went with Kyouko to a family restaurant. The following day, Aoki is absent due to a cold. Rin became worried and went with Kuro and Mimi to visit him.
10	"Kindly to People"; Transliteration: "Hito ni Yasashiku" (Japanese: ひとにやさしく)	December 13, 2007
After a serious, heartfelt attempt to confess her love for Aoki is completely misinterpreted by him, Rin's darker side manifests itself, and she resorts to blackmail and emotional manipulation to try to get him to either return her feelings or at least acknowledge his own for her. Her aggressive tactics backfire, however, and only succeed in causing emotional turmoil for Aoki and Mimi, disrupting his life (as well as an unofficial date with Kyoko), scaring him into keeping his distance. Unsure and confused about what she should do, a depressed Rin finds inspiration in the words of her "romantic rival", Kyoko, and she pursues a radical new strategy: treating the object of her affection with kindness.
11	"Everyone Gets Along"; Transliteration: "Minna Nakayoku" (Japanese: みんななかよく)	December 20, 2007
As Kyoko channels her frustration about her failed date with Aoki into the dodgeball competition between their two classes, each of the girls attempt to mend their strained relationship with their Aoki in her own unique way. After being trapped together in the gymnasium's storage locker for hours, Rin and Aoki finally reconciled and he assures her that he'll always remain by her side. Upon being rescued, Reiji — hysterical beyond reason due to recurring nightmares about his traumatic childhood and his perceived failure to keep his promise to Aki to protect her daughter from harm — snaps and strikes Aoki in rage before dragging Rin back home. Shirai discourages Aoki from making a volatile situation even worse by reminding him of his responsibility as a teacher to take care of his students without demonstrating favoritism, while Rin is reluctantly cowed into abandoning her attempts to explain the situation to Reiji after perceiving the unmitigated anger belying his seemingly calm demeanor.
12	"A Child's Time"; Transliteration: "Kodomo no Jikan" (Japanese: こどものじかん)	December 27, 2007
The next day Rin doesn't come to school. Aoki notices this then he notices that Kuro and Mimi are getting texts from her. Reiji asks Rin what's wrong and she tells him she wants to go to school. He is still extremely angry at Aoki for "being alone with her". He also continues to have nightmares. Rin finds a letter in the mailbox from Aoki, and she later tells Reiji she is going outside for a while and he yells at her, thinking she is going to Aoki's house. He puts a padlock on the outside of her room to keep her from leaving. Reiji has some kind of breakdown when Rin threatens to stab him with scissors.

=== Summary OVA ===
Title	Original release date
"Rin's Classroom Diary" Transliteration: "Rin no Gakkyū Nikki" (Japanese: りんの学級日誌)	July 11, 2008
A compilation episode running 86 minutes, summarizing the first season from the perspective of Rin's thoughts.

== Season 2 ==
=== Second Pre-Midquel ===
Title	Original release date
"Kuro-chan and Shiro-chan" Transliteration: "Kuro-chan to Shiro-chan" (Japanese: くろちゃんとしろちゃん)	January 21, 2009
Kuro wants to become friends with Shirai, because she admires her and feels they have something in common (i.e. hating Aoki). As a sign of friendship Kuro gives a white hair pin to Shirai and wears a black version herself. One day, Shirai inadvertently hurts Kuro's feelings by dismissing her infatuation for Rin as abnormal. After realizing what she has done, Shirai eventually decides to wear the white hair pin in front of Kuro, making her very happy. Shirai ponders what her life would be like if she had a friend like Kuro in her youth. Chronologically, this OVA takes place between the 1st and 2nd episodes of the second season.

=== OVA trilogy ===
No.	Title	Original release date
1	"Fourth Grader"; Transliteration: "Yonensei" (Japanese: よねんせい)	February 20, 2009
Aoki finds Rin sitting up in a tree. He tries to apologize for his earlier behavior. Cut to earlier, Rin shows off her new look, "low-rise", which is extremely revealing. Reiji reluctantly allows her to wear it. He walks her to school, trying to block other parents' view of her. He is accused of being a molester because of his close proximity to Rin's backside. Aoki and Reiji then exchange judgemental thoughts about one another as a result of the way of Rin has dressed. Before leaving, Rin kisses Reiji good-bye, prompting a somewhat victorious glance from Reiji which befuddles Aoki. Rin becomes the Class Representative. The day passes and Rin appears to be making a sincere effort to be a good Class Rep. Aoki asks her to have the class clean the backyard after school. When he enters his classroom after it is over, he notices that all the students' backpacks are gone. He immediately misinterprets this as that they ditched the work. Aoki finally runs into Mimi and Kuro, who are cleaning the backyard. Rin had realized that he had no trust in her to complete the request he made and, sincerely hurt, she runs away. Aoki finds her up in the tree at the beginning of the episode. After accepting Aoki's apology, she goes to climb down, slips, and falls revealing her body. Aoki is slapped for this, but forgiven as usual.
2	"Fun Athletic Meet"; Transliteration: "Tanoshii Undōkai" (Japanese: たのしいうんどうかい)	April 24, 2009
The school is making preparations for the sports festival, and Rin is inspired to 'do her best' towards the day. Aoki and Hoin use faux intimidation to fire up the kids, although it doesn't go as planned on Aoki's part. Hoin comes up with the idea of a costume parade for the teachers, which Shirai is totally against until Kuro gets excited about her dressing up. On the day of the sports festival, Rin is suffering from a chest cough from working on a banner late into the night. She declines Kuro's offer of taking her to the nurses, stating that she wanted to work hard for Aoki as thanks for seeing through the mess that she is. Kuro is upset when Rin tells her that she will do what she can to win over Aoki and goes to find Shirai who had dressed up as a panda in the costume parade, but Shirai hugs her to calm her down, going against her beliefs of skinship. Mimi laments that she misses her father's comfort, and when her mother arrives to cheer on her brother instead, she breaks down and cries. Rin manages to win the relay race for her class, but later that night her cough is still bothering her.
3	"Green Cherry Tree"; Transliteration: "Hazakura no Koro" (Japanese: はざくらのころ)	July 24, 2009
Rin catches a fever from being overworked and has to miss school. Mimi is still feeling lonely and Kuro scolds Aoki because Rin got sick for his sake. Mimi visits Rin's house in order to deliver a handout. Delirious from the fever, Rin asks to suck Mimi's breasts, which she allows in order to help her. Kuro gets Shirai to walk her home, who then apologizes for what she said before. When Reiji notices Mimi's loneliness is similar to how he used to be, he comforts her and assures her that happiness will find her someday. Rin comes back to school healthy and later catches up to Aoki and kisses him.

== Third OVA ==
Title	Original release date
"A Child's Summer Time" Transliteration: "Kodomo no Natsu Jikan" (Japanese: こどものなつじかん)	January 21, 2011
Aoki, Kyoko, Rin, Kuro and Mimi travel to Aoki's hometown where they meet his family, including his younger sister, Chika. As the girls go to the beach, Rin recalls the times she went to the beach with Aki and Reiji. Later that night, Rin tries to make a move on Aoki as he sleeps, but backs off when she believes him to be 'a bit too big' for her. Meanwhile, Kyoko, who got very drunk, mistakes Chika for Aoki and kisses her, though forgets about it the next morning. The next day, the girls help with preparations for Obon, giving Rin fond memories of her mother, so Aoki lets her hug him during the night. They return home the next day, with Rin leaving behind a photo of them to sit next to a picture of Aoki when he was younger.
