= List of Kodomo no Jikan chapters =

The first volume of Kodomo no Jikan as released by Futabasha on December 12, 2005, in Japan

The following is a list of volumes and chapters of the completed Japanese manga series Kodomo no Jikan, written and illustrated by Kaworu Watashiya and published in Japan by Futabasha in the monthly seinen manga magazine Comic High!. Since serialization began on May 22, 2005, 71 chapters have been collected in ten tankōbon to date. At one point, an English language version of the manga was licensed for distribution in North America by Seven Seas Entertainment under the title Nymphet, but the Los Angeles–based company ultimately decided not to publish it due to controversies over its content. An anime adaptation of the series — roughly covering the first twenty chapters of the manga, albeit with plot points and scenes lifted from later installments and featuring an original ending — aired on Japanese television between October 12, 2007, and December 28, 2007, containing twelve episodes.

The main story revolves around newly graduated, twenty-three-year-old teacher Daisuke Aoki, who has just landed his first teaching job as an elementary school instructor at Futatsubashi Elementary School (双ツ橋小学校, Futatsubashi Shōgakkō). He is placed in charge of class 3–1, where one of his students, a mischievously precocious eight-year-old girl named Rin Kokonoe, develops an intense crush on him. Though he does his best to discourage her efforts, she nevertheless continues with her aggressive campaign to win his affections in spite of the problems that ensue that are her attempt to get closer to him. The situation is further complicated not only by the often complex, intertwining relationships existing between them and their respective friends, families, and peers, but also by the everyday life lessons they all learn together, as well as from each other.

== List of tankōbon volumes and manga chapters ==
In keeping with the academic setting, the untitled chapters of Kodomo no Jikan are called jikanme (時間目), which means "class period" in English. This same naming convention is employed in the manga series Negima!: Magister Negi Magi by Ken Akamatsu.

No.	Release date	ISBN
1	December 12, 2005	978-4-575-83177-1
Class Period 1–7 General timeframe: Class Period 1–7: 2005 – Grade 3, first trimester (early April to late July); Specific timeframe: Class Period 2: On or around June 14, 2005
Replacement third grade teacher Daisuke Aoki has problems. One of his students, the cheeky and flirtateous eight-year-old Rin Kokonoe, has a crush on him. He is blackmailed into keeping secret his discovery that she and the wealthy and spoiled Kuro Kagami drove his predecessor (Nakamura) to a nervous breakdown in retaliation for picking on their classmates and bullying their mutual friend, the shy intellectual Mimi Usa, to the point where she quits school in order to protect herself. While his convincing Mimi to return to class and rescuing Rin and a stray cat she was caring for from a potentially fatal fall begins to restore some of their faith in adults, Kuro is unmoved by his efforts and determined to make sure he never lives down his status as a virgin when she learns of it. Though Aoki finds allies in his struggle to find his teaching legs in the form of friendly, busty fellow teacher Kyōko Hōin outside of the classroom and Rin inside of it, this does not stop the latter from using tutoring as a pretense for spending time quality alone with him. In the meantime, Mimi's struggle with her advanced physical development continues as she purchases her first, proper bra with a little help from her two best friends. As Rin's affectionate behavior towards Aoki escalates, Kuro finds the courage to admit her own attraction to Rin, though the latter completely misinterpretes the confession and only Mimi seemes to fully understand her friend's intention. After Rin's intense crush on Aoki blossoms into something resembling genuine love when he admits to liking her, his sudden generosity with affection fills her with joy. However, she is heartbroken when she learns that his change of heart was at least partially motivated by his discovery that she is an orphan, a fact he accidentally learns while attempting to learn more about his class due to the general lack of interest in home visits among his students' parents. Though Aoki manages to indirectly prove to Rin that he cares for her in his own way after visiting her home and speaking with her guardian, her late mother's cousin Reiji Kokonoe, the mending of their relationship comes with a heavy price: she steals his first kiss from him after catching him with his guard down.
2	July 12, 2006	978-4-575-83261-7
Class Period 8–14 General timeframes: Class Period 8–9: 2005 – Grade 3, first trimester (early April to late July); Class Period 9–12: 2005 – Summer vacation (late July to end of August); Class Period 13–14: 2005 – Grade 3, second trimester (early September to late December); Specific timeframes: Class Period 9: July 22, 2005, July 23, 2005, and late July 2005; Class Period 11: August 14, 2005, and between October 2001 and May 2002 (flashback); Class Period 12: August 14, 2005, and between May 2002 and March 2003 (flashback); Class Period 14: uncertain, possibly October 3, 2005 and October 4, 2005
The summer of love is about to complicate the lives of everyone at Futatsubashi Elementary School. Kuro's world is turned upside down as Rin and Aoki independently (and inadvertently) accentuate the frustration of her unrequited love with their antics. Rin suffers from premature separation anxiety at the thought of summer vacation separating her from the object of her affection for weeks. During a combination study session and sleepover at Rin's house, Mimi experiences love at first sight after meeting Rin's cousin Reiji for the first time. The arrival of the Bon Festival commemorating the dead prompts Reiji to reminisce about his unhappy, traumatic childhood, the sequence of events which brought him to Tokyo and into the life of his cousin and later lover, Rin's mother Aki Kokonoe, and how their existence as a happy family was ended by circumstances beyond their control. During the summer interview session with his parents' students, Aoki butts heads twice: first with Reiji, who calls his abilities as a teacher into question while discussing Rin's behavior, and subsequently with fellow teacher Sae Shirai over earning respect, the placement of responsibility in academic matters, and proper evaluation of student performance. As summer gives way to autumn, Aoki attempts to curb the number of students leaving classrooms and the school grounds by becoming a stricter teacher and introducing book readings, though all he succeeds in doing is inciting open rebellion in the form of a massive hide-and-seek session masterminded by Rin. Later, in an attempt to discourage any future amorous advances, he tries to ignore her when she acts up, but when it becomes clear to him that apathy doesn't result in a positive outcome, following a discussion with Hōin and Shirai concerning student and teacher crushes, and their alienation from each other begins having a negative effect on his ability to teach and control his class, Aoki offers her a sincere apology in order to restore the old status quo.
3	February 10, 2007	978-4-575-83328-7 (standard edition); ISBN 978-4-575-83333-1 (special edition)
Class Period 15–21 General timeframes: Class Period 15–16: 2005 – Grade 3, second trimester (early September to late December); Class Period 17: 2005 – Winter break (late December 2005 to early January 2006); Class Period 18–21: 2006 – Grade 3, third trimester (early January to late March); Specific timeframes: Class Period 17: December 24, 2005; Class Period 21: March 19, 2006 and March 22, 2006
With the season of autumn upon them, Aoki and Hōin take their respective classes on a train trip into the great outdoors, during which he is run ragged watching over his three most troublesome students. After he takes Shirai's advice on avoiding excessive physical contact with his female students, Rin attempts to circumvent Aoki's temporary new "hands-off" policy by crossdressing as a boy, quickly ending up dealing with more than she bargained for. On Christmas Eve, Aoki and Rin's holiday experiences are polar opposites in mood: while she joyfully spends it shopping and dining in Reiji's company, he is humiliated by an old friend at a party and completely misses a chance to score with an amorous (and equally single and lonely) Hōin, but does receive a "special" cell phone message from his young admirer as a present, much to his horror. When the new trimester begins, a chance discovery by Kuro triggers Rin's memories about how she first became friends with her and Mimi during the first grade and together with Mimi helped her move beyond the trauma of her mother's death. Reiji, tortured by nightmares and hatred borne from his traumatic childhood, begins shifting the feelings he held for Aki on to her daughter instead, in the delusion that she will be the one who "fixes" him. Meanwhile, Rin begins her own descent into darkness when a failed attempt to make Aoki understand her love for him results in a dramatic confrontation, one which forces him to acknowledge the depth of his own undefined feelings for her and shakes them to their respective cores. In the aftermath, a depressed and dejected Rin is inspired to switch tactics by the words of her "love rival", Hōin, and begins her quest to try earning Aoki's love with kindness instead of taking it by force. During the school's graduation ceremony, Shirai — even more critical of Aoki's abilities as a teacher than usual after having taken over his class while he attended a week-long seminar — unwittlingly finds herself defending him when she explodes at Kuro for humiliating and deriding him in front of Hōin for being a virgin, an action which has two unexpected consequences: she betrays her own virginal status to Aoki, and in the process earns Kuro's starry-eyed admiration.
4	September 12, 2007	978-4-575-83405-5 (standard edition); ISBN 978-4-575-83383-6 (special edition)
Class Period 22–28 General timeframes: Class Period 22: 2006 – Spring break (late March to early April); Class Period 23–28: 2006 – Grade 4, first trimester (early April to late July); Specific timeframes: Class Period 23: April 2006; Class Period 26: June 14, 2006; Class Period 27: Between June 19, 2006 and June 24, 2006; Class Period 28: Late June 2006
During spring break, Hōin and a frustrated, mildly depressed and disillusioned Aoki bond over a drinking session, an experience that leaves him with a renewed sense of inspiration yet still oblivious to her romantic interest in him. The season of the sakura brings with it not only the beginning of grade four but also its fair share of surprises: while Rin volunteers for the class representative position and subtly uses her newfound powers to facilitate Aoki's life as best she can, Kuro and Mimi's suspicion that he might be a closet masochist cows the former into submission and inspires the latter to begin abusing him like her friends, resulting in misunderstandings all around. Reiji and Aoki's animosity towards one another grows as each becomes convinced that the other may be treating Rin inappropriately, though she is mostly confused by the tension. When Shirai, still reeling with confusion from a bizarre combination of lack of tact, brazenness, and hero worship from her young admirer, gives advice about how Kuro should deal with her lesbian attraction to Rin that is angrily misinterpreted as a suggestion that she is abnormal, Shirai realizes that her own social and familial dysfunction makes her a poor judge of what constitutes normal. She makes a subtle, successful gesture to make amends with Kuro, which marks the beginning of her own change of heart. As Aoki and Rin cooperate to make the upcoming school athletic meet successful, the two finally come to an understanding and fully heal the emotional rift from their confrontation weeks earlier. Kuro, however, is bothered by Rin's recent willingness to push herself to the point of severe exhaustion because of her love for their teacher and is even more disturbed by the sudden reemergence of self-esteem issues and an inner sadness not seen since first grade. Aoki also becomes concerned when Rin confesses a fear of her own inner demons to him, though she is confident that she can endure if he remains by her side regaress of what happens. A subsequent attempt by Kuro to prove to herself and others that Aoki is no better than his predecessor only ends with a guidance counselor visit for her. Meanwhile, Mimi, humiliated at the athletic festival, depressed, and struggling with her sense of self-identity, independently learns of the cheerful facade masking Rin's weakness during an intimate encounter with her friend, who was left sick and bedridden due to recent overexertion. Reiji, however, recognizing much of who he once was in Mimi, encourages her to never lose hope that she will find one day find someone who will love and understand her, urging her to not let hatred and sadness build up inside and consume her as his own did him.
5	July 11, 2008	978-4-575-83512-0 (standard edition); ISBN 978-4-575-83495-6 (special edition)
Class Period 29–35 General timeframes: Class Period 29: 2006; Class Period 30–35: 2006 – Grade 4, second trimester (early September to late December); Specific timeframe: Class Period 30: October 2006
As concerns about Rin's well-being grow among her two best friends, the long-standing tension between Kuro and Aoki comes to a head during an annual Tokyo festival. Though unwilling to betray any confidences, Kuro states in no uncertain terms her observation that he is incapable of helping Rin because he cannot give her the kind of love she needs "to sustain herself", namely the romantic kind. While he subsequently manages to defuse Rin and Kuro's efforts to educate Mimi about the nature of an erotic cell phone message, she actively begins avoiding Aoki out of sheer embarrassment for a time after reading a pornographic novel. While he justifies his efforts to Rin as part of his attempt to preserve their childhood innocence and purity, she begins to wonder whether he will remain at her side regardlessof how dark she becomes since she thinks she possesses neither of the qualities he seeks to maintain. A chance comment by Mimi, which finally defuses the awkwardness between her and Aoki, leads him to realize that his intense, hitherto undefinable feelings for Rin are those of a father's love for his daughter. An amusement park visit with the three girls in commemoration of Rin's tenth birthday, with Aoki acting as a chaperone, leads to a private moment where she begins opening up to him about her inner demons, though they are interrupted before Rin can make clear their nature to either Aoki or herself. The development of Shirai's social skills and healing of her emotional scars continues as she repays Hōin's rescue from attending a teacher's workshop by helping her deal with a belligerent, troublemaking mother in charge of the local parent-teacher association. And as Reiji's self-delusion about his future romantic prospect grows, a haunted Rin, after using misdirection to chase away a coworker with a crush on her guardian, makes a second attempt to open up to Aoki, only to have him accidentally discover the hickey-like marks on the back of her neck that she has been hiding for weeks and confront her with his suspicions concerning their origins, going on to ask if Rin is still a virgin. Rin, flustered, defends Reiji and says that he'd never do something like that. Meanwhile, Reiji receives a call from someone representing Rin's father asking to meet with him and discuss custody of Rin. After receiving the news, Rin asks Aoki to come to the meeting, and Aoki agrees. At the meeting, Rin's father brought his lawyer with him. During the meeting, Rin's father admitted that he did ask Aki to abort Rin, but that was because if Aki didn't abort Rin, Aki would die. Reiji, incensed, started to argue with Rin's father while the lawyer made thinly veiled threats about improper treatment of Rin towards Reiji. Aoki wrestles with whether or not to reveal the 'kiss marks' on Rin, but then realizes that if he does, he'll be selfish like the other adults, and that he should allow Rin to speak her own mind. Rin asks her father to talk with her privately, and then tells him that she doesn't want him to visit her anymore. Then, suffering under the guilt that she might've been the one who caused her mother's death, Rin went up to her room and cried, repeatedly saying 'sorry'. Aoki, too, is in trouble for interfering with family affairs.
6	January 21, 2009	978-4-575-83571-7 (standard edition); ISBN 978-4-575-83556-4 (special edition)
Class Period 36–42 General timeframe: Class Period; Specific timeframe: Class Period
Rin tells Aoki she plans to stay with Reiji, since she's the only one he has. Later, Aoki confronts Reiji, who says she plans to marry Rin when she turns 16, much to Aoki's obvious objections. Before spring break starts, Rin makes her peace with Aoki before deleting him from her phone. Whilst visiting a manga café, Rin stumbles upon a dirty website and learns how to masturbate. Whilst out drinking, Kyoko kisses Aoki whilst he is sleeping.
7	July 10, 2009	978-4-575-83645-5
Class Period 43–50 General timeframes: Class Period; Specific timeframe: Class Period
The third year starts and Rin, Kuro and Mimi are once again in Aoki's class, much to the annoyance of Rin, who has been more into sexual activities. The school gets word that an elementary student is planning to commit suicide, so Aoki asks Rin for help. Although the suicide note turns out to be a hoax, Rin does stop a student from being bullied. Later, Kuro goes on a 'date' with Shirai, who helps her make up with her workaholic mother. Rin finds herself being bullied by the other students, and whilst she tries to ignore it, she gets violent once Mimi ends up getting involved as well. After the matter is settled, Rin reveals that she is still in love with Aoki, eventually asking him to help save Reiji and add him back to her phone list.
8	May 12, 2010	978-4-575-83766-7
Class Period 51–57
Rin invites Aoki round her house, much to Reiji's chagrin. Meanwhile, Mimi starts having her period, and Aoki tries to learn how best to teach sexual education. Later, Rin tries posing as an adult teacher to tempt Aoki, although he eventually figures it out and understands more about her situation with Reiji. Aoki, Kyoko and the girls travel to Aoki's hometown for Obon where they meet his sister, Chika, during which Rin tries to make a move on Aoki and a drunken Kyoko ends up kissing Chika. During this time, Reiji joins his co-workers to a hostess bar, where he gets drunk and makes a pass at a waitress, and fellow teacher Kenta Oyajima confesses his feelings to Shirai, though she isn't sure how to respond.
9	January 21, 2011	978-4-575-83861-9 (standard edition); ISBN 978-4-575-83809-1 (special edition)
Class Period 58–64
Both Aoki and Reiji learn that Rin had learnt how to masturbate. Later that day, Rin finds a business card from the hostess bar Reiji went to and gets mad at Reiji for supposedly cheating on Aki. Worried that both Rin and Reiji will be at risk if things are left as they are, Aoki decides to move into their home. Meanwhile, Kuro helps Shirai out by testing Oyajima to see if he's worthy of dating her. Later, Shirai spots Aoki leaving Rin's home and tells him that he needs to move out. When Rin hears of this, she runs away with Kuro, who thinks her mother is having an affair, but Aoki eventually finds them hiding out in his apartment.
10	June 10, 2011	978-4-575-83914-2
Class Period 65-71
Kyoko gets into a situation testing a pinworm sticker on herself, while Aoki accompanies Mimi to a magazine model shoot. Later, the teachers discover an underground website where someone claims to have had sex, prompting Aoki to try to get Rin's help. As Shirai and Oyajima consummate their relationship, Aoki starts to realize that he may be in love with Rin.
11	January 12, 2012	978-4-575-84015-5
Class Period 72-78
Mimi is lost in her thought of loneliness and goes out. She gets saved by Reiji and she confess her love to him. While Shirai and Oyajima are planning a wedding, Kyoko make her step and confess to Aoki. Aoki denies her by saying that he is already in love with someone. His love for Rin grows deeper.
12	September 12, 2012	978-4-575-84126-8
Class Period 79-85
13	June 12, 2013	978-4-575-84246-3
Class Period 86-93
