= Tomokazu Sugita =

Japanese voice actor (born 1980)

- 杉田 智和
- Born: October 11, 1980 (age 46); Ranzan, Saitama, Japan
- Other names: Sugi (杉); Tomo (トモちゃん, Tomo-chan)
- Occupations: Voice actor; author
- Years active: 1998–present
- Agents: Myuras (1998–2001); Atomic Monkey (2001–2020); AGRS (2020–present)
- Website: agrs.co.jp

Tomokazu Sugita (杉田 智和, Sugita Tomokazu; born October 11, 1980) is a Japanese voice actor and author. He mainly plays young men and is characterized by his "deep bass voice," and he often performs ad-libs and imitations.

He is best known for his roles as Gintoki Sakata in Gintama and Joseph Joestar in JoJo's Bizarre Adventure.

== Career ==
Sugita was born in Ranzan, Saitama. When he was in elementary school and watched the TV anime Dragon Quest: The Adventure of Dai, he noticed that the character Hyunckel had a much lower voice than he had imagined from reading the original manga, and thought he was "still cool," but the moment he said his special move, Sugita realized that it was the same voice as Phoenix Ikki from Saint Seiya (Hideyuki Hori). In junior high school, he was a member of the tennis club and served as the head of the club, while in high school, he joined the Shorinji Kempo club (1-dan). When he was a child, he wanted to be a temple priest, and in high school he wanted to be a home economics teacher, a confectioner, or a designer. At the time, when he thought about writing a script for a stage performance at a school event and added sound effects and background music to a recording of his own voice, his older brother heard it and suggested that he try to find a job that made use of his voice and speech, which led him to become a voice actor. While still in high school, he won the Myuras & Animage Award at the Voice Actor Spring School sponsored by the Japan Narration Actor Institute, and entered the Myuras Actors School (now the Vocal and Dance Division of the Japan Narration Actor Institute), while at the same time belonging to the Myuras entertainment agency. At the age of 17, he made his voice acting debut as a gift announcement narrator for Kamen Rider on SKY PerfecTV!.

In 1999, when he was a prep school student, he got his first regular role in an anime production with Cybuster, and continued his voice acting career while studying until he graduated from university. After the dissolution of Myuras in 2001, he joined Atomic Monkey after a period of freelancing, and made his first leading role playing Hideki Motosuwa in the anime series Chobits.

Sugita played the leading roles in both Gintama (Gintoki Sakata) and The Melancholy of Haruhi Suzumiya (Kyon), greatly increasing his fame. In 2009, he won the Best Actor in supporting role award at the 3rd Seiyu Awards. In October 2013, he won the Male Voice Actor Award at the "Newtype x Machi★Asobi Anime Awards 2013", and his role in Gargantia on the Verdurous Planet, Chamber K6821, also won the Mascot Character Award.

In 2010, he starred in a live-action film Wonderful World, alongside Mamoru Miyano, Tomokazu Seki, Rikiya Koyama, Yuka Hirata, Showtaro Morikubo, and Daisuke Namikawa. On April 1, 2020, Sugita left Atomic Monkey, the company he had been affiliated with for many years, and established AGRS Inc. with Kai Itō, a lawyer well versed in the entertainment industry, as an advisor and himself as the representative director.

== Personal life ==
Sugita's mongrel dog, "Naoji" (直司), was adopted by his father from the original owner. He has once taken a commercial for 4gamer with his dog. Naoji died on 6 September 2018. His favorite colors are black and silver. He says that the gift that makes him happiest is a handwritten letter, as he enjoys moments when he can feel the impact one person can have on another through a letter.

== Filmography ==
=== Anime series ===
Year	Title	Role	Notes	Ref.
2000	Ceres, Celestial Legend	Kagami Mikage		
2001	Dennou Boukenki Webdiver	Gladion		
2001	X/1999	Subaru Sumeragi		
2002	Chobits	Hideki Motosuwa		
2002	Dragon Drive	Kyoji Tachibana		
2002	Please Teacher!	Masami Yamada		
2003	Bobobo-bo Bo-bobo	Over		
2003	Inuyasha	Renkotsu		
2003	Ninja Scroll: The Series	Tatsunosuke		
2003	Please Twins!	Masami Yamada		
2003	Saint Beast ~Seijuu Kourin Hen~	Ryusei no Kira		
2004	Mobile Suit Gundam SEED Destiny	Youlan Kent		
2005	Basilisk Kouga Ninpou Chou	Hattori Kyouhachirou		
2005	Eyeshield 21	Reiji Maruko		
2005	Genesis of Aquarion	Sirius De Alisia		
2005	Honey and Clover	Takumi Mayama		
2005	Legend of DUO	Zieg		
2005	Pani Poni Dash!	Alien Subordinate		
2005	Shuffle!	Rin Tsuchimi		
2005	Magical Girl Lyrical Nanoha A's	Chrono Harlaown (six years later)		
2006	Black Lagoon: The Second Barrage	Lotton the Wizard		
2006	Bleach Season 4: The Bount	Noba		
2006	Gadget Trial	Major Mihara		
2006	Galaxy Angel II Mugen Kairō no Kagi	Soldum Seldor		
2006	Gintama	Gintoki Sakata		
2006	Hiiro no Kakera	Takuma Onizaki		
2006	Honey and Clover II	Takumi Mayama		
2006	Inukami!	Shirou		
2006	Kanon	Yuuichi Aizawa		
2006	Super Robot Wars Original Generation: Divine Wars	Brooklyn Luckfield		
2006	The Melancholy of Haruhi Suzumiya	Kyon		
2006	The Wallflower	Takenaga Oda		
2007	Ayakashi	Kare		
2007	Baccano!	Graham Specter		
2007	Bleach Season 6: The Arrancar	Kensei Muguruma		
2007	Bokurano	Daiichi Yamura		
2007	Dragonaut -The Resonance-	Howlingstar		
2007	Gintama S2	Gintoki Sakata		
2007	Kodomo no Jikan	Reiji Kokonoe		
2007	Lucky Star	Clerk Sugita, Kyon		
2007	Saint Beast: Kouin Jojishi Tenshi Tan	Ryusei no Kira		
2007	Magical Girl Lyrical Nanoha Strikers	Chrono Harlaown		
2007	Sayonara, Zetsubou-Sensei	Ikkyū/Aoyama		
2007	Sgt. Frog	Vending Machine	Episode 58	
2007	Shuffle! Memories	Rin Tsuchimi		
2007	Sisters of Wellber	Prince Rodin Ciol		
2007	Toward the Terra	Soldier Blue		
2008	Corpse Princess	Shūji Isaki		
2008	Gintama S3	Gintoki Sakata		
2008	Hakushaku to Yōsei	Raven		
2008	Macross Frontier	Leon Mishima		
2008	Time of Eve	Setoro		
2008	Toaru Majutsu no Index	Aureolus Izzard		
2008	Zoku Sayonara Zetsubō Sensei	Ikkyū/Aoyama		
2009	Case Closed	Kaita Yasuji		
2009	Gintama S4	Gintoki Sakata		
2009	Hey, Class President!	Chiga Yasuhiro		
2009	Maria Holic	Tōichirō Kanae		
2009	Natsu no Arashi!	Takeshi Yamashiro		
2009	The Melancholy of Haruhi Suzumiya	Kyon		
2009	Miracle Train	Saki Tochō		
2009	Umineko: When They Cry	Ronove		
2009	Yumeiro Patissiere	Ricardo "Rick" Benigni		
2010	And Yet the Town Moves	Natsuhiko Moriaki		
2010	Arakawa Under the Bridge	Hoshi		
2010	Inazuma Eleven	Edgar Valtinas		
2010	MM!	Store Manager, Dōmyōji		
2010	Nura: Rise of the Yokai Clan	Zen		
2010	Panty & Stocking with Garterbelt	Oscar H. Genius/Ugly Snot		
2010	Super Robot Wars Original Generation: The Inspector	Brooklyn Luckfield		
2010	Tegami Bachi	Moss		
2010	The Legend of the Legendary Heroes	Lucile Eris		
2010	Togainu no Chi	Keisuke		
2010	Tono to Issho: 1-Funkan Gekijō	Shigezane Date		
2010	Yumeiro Patissiere SP Professional	Ricardo "Rick" Benigni		
2011	Beelzebub	Hajime Kanzaki		
2011	Gintama''	Gintoki Sakata		
2011	Alice in the Country of Hearts	Nightmare Gottschalk		
2011	Horizon in the Middle of Nowhere	Muneshige Tachibana		
2011	Maji de Watashi ni Koi Shinasai!	Inoue Jun		
2011	We Without Wings	DJ Condor		
2011	Sgt. Frog	Tasoraorari Alien		
2011	Sket Dance	Kazuyoshi "Switch" Usui		
2011	Starry Sky	Nanami Kanata		
2011	Tono to Issho: Gantai no Yabō	Shigezane Date		
2012	Daily Lives of High School Boys	Hidenori Tabata		
2012	From the New World	Rijin		
2012	Gintama': Enchōsen	Gintoki Sakata		
2012	Hiiro no Kakera	Takuma Onizaki		
2012	Horizon in the Middle of Nowhere 2nd Season	Muneshige Tachibana		
2012	Inu x Boku SS	Kagerō Shōkiin		
2012	Ixion Saga DT	Leon		
2012	JoJo's Bizarre Adventure	Joseph Joestar		
2012	K	Reisi Munakata		
2012	La storia della Arcana Famiglia	Pace		
2012	Magi: The Labyrinth of Magic	Drakon		
2012	Persona 4 The Animation	Daisuke Nagase		
2012	Shirokuma Café	Wolf and Chinstrap Penguin		
2012	Tsuritama	Akira Agarkar Yamada		
2013	Attack on Titan	Marlo Freudenberg		
2013	BlazBlue Alter Memory	Ragna the Bloodedge		
2013	Cuticle Detective Inaba	Yatarō		
2013	Gargantia on the Verdurous Planet	Chamber		
2013	Gingitsune	Seishirō Kirishima		
2013	Love Lab	Enomoto's Brother		
2013	Pokémon Origins	Takeshi/Brock		
2013	Saint Seiya Omega	Phoenix Ikki		
2013	Samurai Flamenco	Gotou Hidenori		
2013	Senki Zesshou Symphogear G	Dr. Ver		
2013	Uta no Prince-sama Maji Love 2000%	Otori Raging		
2013	WataMote	Hatsushiba		
2014	Buddy Complex	Lee Conrad		
2014	Buddy Complex Kanketsu-hen: Ano Sora ni Kaeru Mirai de	Lee Conrad		
2014	Gundam Build Fighters Try	Kei Karima		
2014	Nanana's Buried Treasure	Hiiyo Ikusaba		
2014	No-Rin	Kuwanosuke Naganawa		
2014	Nobunaga Concerto	Ashikaga Yoshiaki		
2014	Nobunaga the Fool	Leonardo da Vinci		
2014	Riddle Story of Devil	Kaiba		
2014	Terra Formars	Ichiro Hiruma		
2014	The Irregular at Magic High School	Takeaki Kirihara		
2014	The World Is Still Beautiful	Neil		
2015	Ace of Diamond: Second Season	Kengo Inui		
2015	Assassination Classroom	Tadaomi Karasuma		
2015	Battle Spirits: Burning Soul	Kanetsugu Hōryokuin		
2015	Charlotte	Okonomiyaki store Owner		
2015	Cute High Earth Defense Club Love!	Gōra Hakone		
2015	Food Wars: Shokugeki no Soma	Etsuya Eizan		
2015	Gintama°	Gintoki Sakata		
2015	K: Return of Kings	Reisi Munakata		
2015	Kagewani	Sōsuke Banba		
2015	Minna Atsumare! Falcom Gakuen SC	Roias		
2015	Q Transformer: Saranaru Ninkimono e no Michi	Starscream		
2015	Samurai Warriors	Kiyomasa Kato		
2015	Senki Zesshou Symphogear GX	Dr. Ver		
2015	The Asterisk War	Dirk Eberwein		
2015	The Disappearance of Nagato Yuki-chan	Kyon		
2015	The Testament of Sister New Devil	Yahiro Takigawa, Lars		
2015	Uta no Prince-sama Maji Love Revolutions	Otori Raging		
2015	Yamada-kun and the Seven Witches	Hideaki Tsurukawa		
2016	Assassination Classroom 2nd Season	Tadaomi Karasuma		
2016	Cheer Boys!!	Wataru Mizoguchi		
2016	Classicaloid	Beethoven		
2016	Cute High Earth Defense Club LOVE! LOVE!	Gōra Hakone		
2016	D.Gray-man Hallow	Reever Wenham		
2016	Danganronpa 3: The End of Hope's Peak High School	Gundham Tanaka		
2016	Drifters	Count Saint-Germi		
2016	First Love Monster	Ginjirō Sannomiya		
2016	Food Wars: Shokugeki no Soma The Second Plate	Etsuya Eizan		
2016	Kagewani Shou	Sōsuke Banba		
2016	Haven't You Heard? I'm Sakamoto	Atsushi Maeda		
2016	March Comes In like a Lion	Tatsuyuki Misumi		
2016	Magi: Adventure of Sinbad	Drakon		
2016	Norn9	Ron Muroboshi		
2016	Mr. Osomatsu	Akumatsu		
2016	Poco's Udon World	Shinobu Nakajima		
2016	Puzzle & Dragons X	Nyudo		
2016	Sekkō Boys	Saint Giorgio		
2016	Taboo Tattoo	Tom Shredfield		
2016	Terra Formars: Revenge	Ichiro Hiruma		
2016	To Be Hero	Prince		
2016	Uta no Prince-sama Maji Love Legend Star	Otori Raging		
2016	World Trigger	Masato Kageura		
2017	Aho Girl	Akuru Akutsu		
2017	Cardfight!! Vanguard G: NEXT	Nome Tatsunagi		
2017	Chronos Ruler	Snake		
2017	Classicaloid 2	Beethoven		
2017	Dive!!	Atsuhiko Yamada		
2017	Elegant Yokai Apartment Life	Secondhand Bookshop Employee		
2017	Food Wars: Shokugeki no Soma The Third Plate	Etsuya Eizan		
2017	Gintama.	Gintoki Sakata		
2017	Gintama. Porori-hen	Gintoki Sakata		
2017	Granblue Fantasy The Animation	Drang		
2017	Hand Shakers	Hibiki		
2017	Ikemen Sengoku: Toki o Kakeru ga Koi wa Hajimaranai	Nobunaga Oda		
2017	Kakegurui	Kaede Manyūda		
2017	March Comes in like a Lion 2nd Season	Tatsuyuki Misumi		
2017	Senki Zesshou Symphogear AXZ	Dr. Ver		
2018	Amanchu! Advance	Hayate Kohinata		
2018	Attack on Titan Season 3	Marlo Freudenberg		
2018	Black Clover	Gueldre Poizot		
2018	Boarding School Juliet	Chizuru Maru		
2018	Calamity of a Zombie Girl	Syuichiro Takanashi		
2018	Cells at Work!	Basophil		
2018	Dagashi Kashi 2	Beniyutaka Shidare		
2018	Dances with the Dragons	Remedius		
2018	Full Metal Panic! Invisible Victory	Lee Fowler		
2018	Gintama. Shirogane no Tamashii-hen	Gintoki Sakata		
2018	Goblin Slayer	Lizard Priest		
2018	Golden Kamuy	Kōhei Nikaidō, Yōhei Nikaidō		
2018	Hataraku Onii-san!	That Animal That Shall Not be Named		
2018	High Score Girl	Elementary School Homeroom Teacher		
2018	Isekai Izakaya "Nobu"	Nobuyuki Yazawa		
2018	Junji Ito Collection	Hideo		
2018	Kakuriyo: Bed and Breakfast for Spirits	Tannosuke		
2018	Major 2nd	Hiromu Tanba		
2018	You Don't Know Gunma Yet	Yajiru		
2018	One Piece	Charlotte Katakuri		
2018	Persona 5: The Animation	Yusuke Kitagawa		
2018	Phantom in the Twilight	Tōryū		
2018	Pop Team Epic	Pipimi		
2018	Shinkansen Henkei Robo Shinkalion	Hokuto Hayasugi		
2018	Souten no Ken Re:Genesis	Simeon Nagid		
2018	Space Battleship Tiramisu	Maybach Wilhelm		
2018	Tada Never Falls in Love	Hajime Sugimoto	From ep. 11 to 13	
2018	The Seven Deadly Sins: Revival of The Commandments	Escanor		
2018	Wotakoi: Love is Hard for Otaku	Taro Kabakura		
2019	Ace of Diamond act II	Kengo Inui		
2019	African Office Worker	Cockroach, Rabbit man, Apple rabbit		
2019	Afterlost	Takuya		
2019	Aikatsu Friends!	Osamu Minato	Episode 43	
2019	Astra Lost in Space	Jed Walker		
2019	Boruto: Naruto Next Generations	Ryūki	Episode 110	
2019	Case File nº221: Kabukicho	Godfrey Norton		
2019	Demon Slayer: Kimetsu no Yaiba	Gyōmei Himejima		
2019	Fate/Grand Order - Absolute Demonic Front: Babylonia	Demon God King, Lev Lainur Flauros		
2019	Food Wars: Shokugeki no Soma The Fourth Plate	Etsuya Eizan		
2019	King of Prism: Shiny Seven Stars	Joji Takadanobaba		
2019	My Roommate Is a Cat	Tarō		
2019	Namu Amida Butsu! Rendai Utena	DJ Hotoke		
2019	RobiHachi	Yang		
2019	Stand My Heroes: Piece of Truth	Itsuki Aoyama		
2019	Star Twinkle PreCure	Yukio	Episode 24	
2019	The Seven Deadly Sins: Wrath of the Gods	Escanor		
2019	To the Abandoned Sacred Beasts	Miles (Cenetaur)		
2019	True Cooking Master Boy	Lei En/Leon		
2020	Animation x Paralympic	Fuse Ayumu	Episode 11	
2020	Appare-Ranman!	TJ		
2020	ARP: Backstage Pass	Drummer senpai		
2020	Dogeza: I Tried Asking While Kowtowing	Suwaru Doge		
2020	Food Wars: Shokugeki no Soma The Fifth Plate	Etsuya Eizan		
2020	ID: Invaded	Denshin Katsuyama		
2020	If My Favorite Pop Idol Made It to the Budokan, I Would Die	Fumi-kun		
2020	Kaoru no Taisetsu na Mono	Giichi		
2020	Magatsu Wahrheit -Zuerst-	Faust		
2020	Mr Love: Queen's Choice	Zen (Victor)		
2020	Oda Cinnamon Nobunaga	Uesugi Julian Kenshin		
2020	Sakura Wars the Animation	Reiji Shiba		
2020	Seton Academy: Join the Pack!	King Shishino		
2020	Shadowverse	Rowen		
2020	Sleepy Princess in the Demon Castle	Bianco	Episode 9	
2020	The God of High School	Kang Man-Seok		
2020	The 8th Son? Are You Kidding Me?	Kurt		
2020	Warlords of Sigrdrifa	Kinpatsu		
2020	With a Dog AND a Cat, Every Day is Fun	Neko-sama		
2021	Back Arrow	Shū Bi		
2021	Backflip!!	Hideo Ōminato		
2021	Cells at Work!!	Basophil		
2021	D Cide Traumerei	Riku Eda		
2021	Demon Slayer: Kimetsu no Yaiba Mugen Train Arc	Gyōmei Himejima		
2021	Farewell, My Dear Cramer	Shōjirō Gotō		
2021	Hortensia Saga	Flegel Dreadnought		
2021	I'm Standing on a Million Lives Season 2	Game Master		
2021	Kaginado	Yuichi Aizawa		
2021	Life Lessons with Uramichi Oniisan	Tobikichi Usahara		
2021	Miss Kobayashi's Dragon Maid S	Clemene	Episode 2	
2021	Mushoku Tensei: Jobless Reincarnation	Rudeus Greyrat (former self)		
2021	My Hero Academia Season 5	Tomoyasu Chikazoku/Skeptic		
2021	Night Head 2041	Kōji Kazama		
2021	Pazudora	Ishikawa Goemon		
2021	Platinum End	Tonma Rodriguez		
2021	Rumble Garanndoll	Balzac Yamada		
2021	Sorcerous Stabber Orphen: Battle of Kimluck	Quo		
2021	The Duke of Death and His Maid	McFarlane	Episode 7	
2021	The Honor Student at Magic High School	Takeaki Kirihara	Episode 3	
2021	The Seven Deadly Sins: Dragon's Judgement	Escanor		
2021	That Time I Got Reincarnated as a Slime Season 2	Adalman	Episode 45	
2021	True Cooking Master Boy Season 2	Lei En/Leon		
2021	Uchuu Nanchara Kotetsu-kun	Enban-san		
2021	Visual Prison	Panya		
2022	Aru Asa Dummy Head Mike ni Natteita Ore-kun no Jinsei	Ore-kun		
2022	Black Rock Shooter: Dawn Fall	Smiley		
2022	Bleach: Thousand-Year Blood War	Kensei Muguruma		
2022	Chiikawa	Pochette no Yoroi-san		
2022	Don't Hurt Me, My Healer!	Brigan		
2022	Duel Masters Win	Narrator		
2022	Golden Kamuy 4	Kōhei Nikaidō		
2022	I'm the Villainess, So I'm Taming the Final Boss	Almond		
2022	In the Land of Leadale	Kartatz		
2022	Love After World Domination	Supreme Leader Bosslar		
2022	Miss Kuroitsu from the Monster Development Department	Zet Acht	Episode 12	
2022	My Hero Academia Season 6	Tomoyasu Chikazoku/Skeptic		
2022	Orient	Yatarō Inuda		
2022	Raven of the Inner Palace	Setsu Gyoei	Episode 4, 6, 10-11	
2022	Requiem of the Rose King	Buckingham	Second cour	
2022	Salaryman's Club	Kotetsu Gokura		
2022	Suisei no Freyline: Prologue	Morita		
2022	The Human Crazy University	Ore-kun		
2022	The Strongest Sage with the Weakest Crest	Dokiel Melkia	Episode 7-8	
2022	Uzaki-chan Wants to Hang Out! ω	Shirō Sakurai		
2023	A Galaxy Next Door	Masahiro Morikuni		
2023	Chillin' in My 30s After Getting Fired from the Demon King's Army	Dariel		
2023	Endo and Kobayashi Live! The Latest on Tsundere Villainess Lieselotte	Baldur Riefenstahl		
2023	Goblin Slayer II	Lizard Priest		
2023	I'm Giving the Disgraced Noble Lady I Rescued a Crash Course in Naughtiness	Allen Crawford		
2023	Kaina of the Great Snow Sea	Ngapoji		
2023	Magical Destroyers	Old Leader		
2023	My Daughter Left the Nest and Returned an S-Rank Adventurer	Lionel		
2023	My New Boss Is Goofy	Mitsuo Aoyama		
2023	Protocol: Rain	Ryūsei Nagamine		
2023	Rurouni Kenshin	Jin-e Udō		
2023	Shy	Shrimpy		
2023	The Devil Is a Part-Timer!!	Farfarello		
2023	The Eminence in Shadow 2nd Season	Crimson		
2023	The Fruit of Evolution 2	Vitor		
2023	The Marginal Service	Bolts Dexter		
2023	Tokyo Revengers: Christmas Showdown	Taiju Shiba		
2023	Trigun Stampede	Chuck Lee		
2023	Undead Girl Murder Farce	Aleister Crowley		
2023	Undead Unluck	Apocalypse		
2023	Why Raeliana Ended Up at the Duke's Mansion	Justin Shamal		
2024	2.5 Dimensional Seduction	Ogino		
2024	A Terrified Teacher at Ghoul School!	Yanagida		
2024	Astro Note	Tomihiro Wakabayashi		
2024	Beastars Final Season	Holger		
2024	Blue Miburo	Isami Kondō		
2024	Brave Bang Bravern!	Superbia		
2024	Dandadan	Taro		
2024	Delusional Monthly Magazine	Edward Chi		
2024	Demon Slayer: Kimetsu no Yaiba Hashira Training Arc	Gyōmei Himejima		
2024	I Was Reincarnated as the 7th Prince so I Can Take My Time Perfecting My Magical Ability	Galilea		
2024	Ishura	Higuare the Pelagic		
2024	Kaiju No. 8	Takamichi Hotaka		
2024	Kinnikuman: Perfect Origin Arc	Neptuneman		
2024	Let This Grieving Soul Retire!	Ansem Smart, Narrator		
2024	Mayonaka Punch	Tanbura		
2024	Mecha-Ude	Alma		
2024	Mushoku Tensei Season II	Rudeus Greyrat (former self)		
2024	My Hero Academia Season 7	Tomoyasu Chikazoku/Skeptic		
2024	No Longer Allowed in Another World	Sengoku		
2024	Oblivion Battery	Teitoku Baseball Coach		
2024	Our Last Crusade or the Rise of a New World Season II	Sir Karosos Newton		
2024	Quality Assurance in Another World	Ren		
2024	Ranma ½	Tatewaki Kunō		
2024	Sasaki and Peeps	Sasaki		
2024	Spice and Wolf: Merchant Meets the Wise Wolf	Yarei		
2024	The Weakest Tamer Began a Journey to Pick Up Trash	Borolda		
2024	Tono to Inu	Tono		
2024	Viral Hit	Tou-Kei		
2025	9-Nine: Ruler's Crown	Renya Takamine		
2025	Binan Kōkō Chikyū Bōei-bu Haikara!	Gotenba		
2025	Chikuwa Senki	Chikuwa Senki		
2025	#Compass 2.0: Combat Providence Analysis System	Pierre the 77th		
2025	Detectives These Days Are Crazy!	Nipple-Tasting Man, Cross Chest Hair Man, Man Who Likes Ropes		
2025	Ganglion	Hopeman		
2025	Guilty Gear Strive: Dual Rulers	Narrator		
2025	I'm a Noble on the Brink of Ruin, So I Might as Well Try Mastering Magic	Radon		
2025	Call of the Night	LoveGreen		
2025	Kowloon Generic Romance	Hajime Kudō		
2025	Lazarus	Sam	Episode 4	
2025	Let's Play	Link Hudson		
2025	Maebashi Witches	Keroppe		
2025	Mashin Creator Wataru	Mashin Ryūjinmaru / Ryūjin		
2025	Ninja vs. Gokudo	Anatomi Kurita		
2025	Plus-Sized Misadventures in Love!	Hiroki Maezono		
2025	Sakamoto Days	Taro Sakamoto		
2025	Witch Watch	Zack Balan		
2025	Your Forma	Kazimir Matinovich Szubin		
2026	A Tale of the Secret Saint	Quintin Agata		
2026	Dara-san of Reiwa	Naomichi Fudeki		
2026	Hell Mode	Butler Von Granvelle		
2026	Hell Teacher: Jigoku Sensei Nube	Daidarabocchi		
2026	Golden Kamuy Final Season	Kōhei Nikaidō		
2026	High School! Kimengumi	Sakugo Jidai		
2026	Jujutsu Kaisen	Hiromi Higuruma		
2026	Kamui: He's Behind You	Kamui		
2026	Magical Sisters LuluttoLilly	Yasuo Kandachi		
2026	Mushoku Tensei Season III	Rudeus Greyrat (former self) / Alternate Rudeus Greyrat (future self)		
2026	Re:Zero − Starting Life in Another World 4th Season	Reid Astrea		
2026	Scum of the Brave	Father Ayashima		
2026	Snowball Earth	Isseki Sagami		
2026	Yoroi-Shinden Samurai Troopers	Seikai Nyūdō		
2027	Are You a Landmine, Chihara-san?	Hibiya		
2027	Dengeki Daisy	Sōichirō Kurebayashi		
2027	Wound & Bandage	Narrator		

=== Original video animation ===
Year	Title	Role	Notes
2002	Gate Keepers 21	Police officer Kimura, Ihara	
2002	Shoot Fighter Tekken	Mitsuhide "Asura" Kuroda	
2002	Yukikaze	Boy	
2004	Ghost Talker's Daydream	Kadotake Souichirou	
2004	Embracing Love	Reporter	
2004	Sakura Wars: Ecole de Paris	Hereford	
2005	Gintama – Jump Festa Special	Gintoki Sakata	
2005	Rebirth Moon Divergence OAV	Gaza	
2005	Saint Beast ~Ikusen no Hiru to Yoru Hen~	Ryusei no Kira	
2005	Super Robot Wars Original Generation: The Animation	Brooklyn Luckfield	
2006	Kanon Kazahana	Yuichi Aizawa	
2006	Maria-sama ga Miteru S3 OVA	Akimitsu Yakushiji, Tomomitsu Yakushiji	
2007	Kodomo no Jikan: Anata ga Watashi ni Kureta Mono	Reiji Kokonoe	
2007	Toward the Terra Specials	Soldier Blue	
2008	Gintama Jump Festa Specials – White Demon's Birth	Gintoki Sakata	
2008	Kirepapa.	Shin Funaba	
2008	Kodomo no Jikan: Anata ga Watashi ni Kureta Mono	Reiji Kokonoe	
2008	Saint Beast ~Ikusen no Hiru to Yoru Hen~	Ryusei no Kira	
2008	Goku Sayonara Zetsubō Sensei	Ikkyū	
2009	Kodomo no Jikan Nigakki	Reiji Kokonoe	
2009	Saint Seiya: The Lost Canvas	Taurus Rasgado	
2009	Air Gear: Kuro no Hane to Nemuri no Mori -Break on the Sky-	Yasuyoshi "Aeon" Sano	
2009	Kodomo no Jikan Nigakki	Reiji Kokonoe	
2010	Beelzebub – Hirotta Aka-chan wa Dai Maō!?	Hajime Kanzaki	
2010	Black Lagoon: Roberta's Blood Trail	Lotton the Wizard	
2010	Love Pistols	Yonekuni Madarame	
2010	The Tyrant Falls in Love	Mitsugu Kurokawa	
2010	Shigezane Date OVA	Shigezane Date	
2011	Busou Shinki: Moon Angel ONA	Ken	
2011	Spelunker Sensei	Spelunker	
2011	VitaminX Addiction	Katsuragi Ginji	
2012	Hori-san to Miyamura-kun	Yasuda	
2013	Assassination Classroom Jump Super Anime Tour Special	Tadaomi Karasuma	
2013	Corpse Party: Tortured Souls	Kizami Yuuya	
2013	Gargantia on the Verdurous Planet	Chamber	
2013	Sket Dance OVA	Kazuyoshi "Switch" Usui	
2014	Assassination Classroom – Meeting Time	Tadaomi Karasuma	
2014	Gintama Jump Festa Specials – The Input of This Super Move is Too Hard and I Can't Pull It Off	Gintoki Sakata	
2014	Magi: Adventure of Sinbad OVA	Drakon	
2014	Terra Formars – 00-02 UNDEFEATED	Ichiro Hiruma	
2014	Yamada-kun and the Seven Witches OVA	Hideaki Tsurukawa	
2015	Gintama Jump Festa Specials – Delicious goods are preempted after being postponed, so be sure to eat them first	Gintoki Sakata	
2015	Hero Company	Daichi Hadō, Macaron Navy	
2015	The Disappearance of Nagato Yuki-chan – Endless Summer Vacation	Kyon	
2017	Gintama°: Love Incense Arc	Gintoki Sakata	
2017	Attack on Titan: Lost Girls	Freudenberg	
2017	First Love Monster OVA	Ginjirō Sannomiya	
2017	Mobile Suit Gundam Thunderbolt 2	Vincent Pike	
2017	Landreaall	Rudy	
2019	Wotakoi OVA	Tarō Kabakura	

=== Original net animation ===
Year	Title	Role	Notes
2018	Sword Gai: The Animation	Naoki Miki	
2020	Cagaster of an Insect Cage	Lazaro	
2020	The House Spirit Tatami-chan	Kusuguri Bōzu	
2021	Aoi Hane Mitsuketa!	Karasu	
2021	Cute Executive Officer	Claimer (Complaining Customer)	
2021	Gintama The Semi-Final	Gintoki Sakata	
2021	Gundam Breaker Battlogue	Kadomatsu	
2021	The Heike Story	Minamoto no Yoritomo	
2021	The Way of the Househusband	Bob	
2022	Bastard!! -Heavy Metal, Dark Fantasy-	Abigail	
2023	Junji Ito Maniac: Japanese Tales of the Macabre	Tachi	
2023	Record of Ragnarok II	Jack the Ripper	
2026	Dandelion	Kikugumi squad leader	
2026	Steel Ball Run: JoJo's Bizarre Adventure	Funny Valentine	

=== Anime films ===
Year	Title	Role	Notes
2001	Metropolis	Marduk Party Member, Policeman, Scientist	
2009	Macross Frontier the Movie: The False Songstress	Leon Mishima	
2010	Afro Samurai: Resurrection	Opening narration	
2010	Gintama: The Movie	Gintoki Sakata	
2010	Time of Eve: The Movie	Setoro	
2010	The Disappearance of Haruhi Suzumiya	Kyon	
2011	Alice in the Country of Hearts	Nightmare Gottschalk	
2011	Macross Frontier the Movie: The Wings of Goodbye	Leon Mishima	
2013	Gintama: The Movie: The Final Chapter: Be Forever Yorozuya	Gintoki Sakata	
2014	K: Missing Kings	Reisi Munakata	
2016	Galactic Armored Fleet Majestic Prince: Genetic Awakening	Sugita	
2017	Gō-chan: Moco to Chinjū no Mori no Nakama-tachi	Tamarin	
2017	Godzilla: Planet of the Monsters	Martin Lazzari	
2017	King of Prism: Pride the Hero	Joji Takadanobaba	
2017	Mobile Suit Gundam Thunderbolt: Bandit Flower	Vincent Pike	
2018	Dragon Ball Super: Broly	Lemo	
2018	Godzilla: City on the Edge of Battle	Martin Lazzari	
2018	Godzilla: The Planet Eater	Martin Lazzari	
2018	K: Seven Stories	Reisi Munakata	
2018	Maquia: When the Promised Flower Blooms	Izor	
2018	The Seven Deadly Sins the Movie: Prisoners of the Sky	Escanor	
2018	TIME DRIVER: Bokura ga Kaita Mirai	Time Driver	
2019	Shinkansen Henkei Robo Shinkalion the Movie: Mirai Kara Kita Shinsoku no ALFA-X	Hokuto Hayasugi	
2020	Demon Slayer: Kimetsu no Yaiba – The Movie: Mugen Train	Gyōmei Himejima	
2020	Goblin Slayer: Goblin's Crown	Lizard Priest	
2021	The Crocodile That Lived for 100 Days	Wani's father	
2021	Fate/Grand Order Final Singularity – Grand Temple of Time: Solomon	Solomon	
2021	Gintama: The Final	Gintoki Sakata	
2021	Riku wa Yowakunai	Yōsuke	
2021	Ryōma! Shinsei Gekijōban Tennis no Ōji-sama	Wolf	
2021	Shimajiro Shimajiro Shimashiro Soro Tofufune	Garbiz boss	
2021	The Seven Deadly Sins: Cursed by Light	Escanor	
2022	Backflip!!	Hideo Ōminato	
2022	Dragon Ball Super: Super Hero	Lemo	
2022	One Piece Film: Red	Charlotte Katakuri	
2023	Sand Land	Swimmer's Papa	
2024	Dead Dead Demon's Dededede Destruction	Isobeyan	
2024	Demon Slayer: Kimetsu no Yaiba – To the Hashira Training	Gyōmei Himejima	
2024	Zegapain STA	Tōya	
2025	100 Meters	Onomichi	
2025	Cute High Earth Defense Club Eternal Love!	Gōra Hakone	
2025	Demon Slayer: Kimetsu no Yaiba – The Movie: Infinity Castle	Gyomei Himejima	
2025	Tatsuki Fujimoto Before Chainsaw Man	Shikaku	Compilation Film (Segment: Shikaku)
2026	Labyrinth	Tosaka	
2026	The Keeper of the Camphor Tree		
2026	Assassination Classroom The Movie: Our Time	Tadaomi Karasuma	
2026	Armored Trooper VOTOMS: Die Graue Hexe	Adrian Dysler	

=== Live-action films ===
Year	Title	Role	Notes	Ref.
2022	Yokaipedia	Yamabiko (voice)		

=== Video games ===
Year	Title	Role	Other notes
1999	Kanon	Yuuichi Aizawa	
2000	Super Robot Wars Alpha	Brooklyn Luckfield	
2003	2nd Super Robot Wars Alpha	Brooklyn Luckfield	
2004	Blood Will Tell	Hyakkimaru	
2005	3rd Super Robot Wars Alpha: To the End of the Galaxy	Brooklyn Luckfield	
2005	Genji: Dawn of the Samurai	Taira no Kagekiyo	
2006	Last Escort	Masato Omi	
2006	Genji: Days of the Blade	Taira no Kagekiyo	
2007	Guilty Gear 2: Overture	That Man	
2007	The Promise of Haruhi Suzumiya	Kyon	
2007	Super Robot Wars: Original Generations	Brooklyn Luckfield	
2007	Super Robot Wars Original Generation Gaiden	Brooklyn Luckfield	
2008	BlazBlue: Calamity Trigger	Ragna the Bloodedge	
2008	Corpse Party Blood Covered	Narrator, Yuuya Kizami, Souichiro Shimoda, the toilet gentleman spirit	
2008	Guilty Gear XX Accent Core Plus	That Man, Millia's Fan	
2008	Star Ocean: The Second Story	Dias Flac	PSP port
2008	The Perplexity of Haruhi Suzumiya	Kyon	
2008	Togainu no Chi	Keisuke	
2009	BlazBlue: Continuum Shift	Ragna the Bloodedge, Bang's Subordinate B	
2009	The Excitement of Haruhi Suzumiya	Kyon	
2009	The Parallel of Haruhi Suzumiya	Kyon	
2009	The Series of Haruhi Suzumiya	Kyon	
2009	Kamen Rider: Climax series	Kamen Rider Kiva (voice)	
2009	Luminous Arc 3	Glenn	
2009	Samurai Warriors 3	Kiyomasa Kato	
2009	Starry Sky	Nanami Kanata	
2010	.hack//Link	Fluegel	
2010	Fist of the North Star: Ken's Rage	Shin	
2010	Metal Gear Solid: Peace Walker	Kazuhira Miller	
2010	Tokimeki Memorial Girl's Side: 3rd Story	Ruka Sakurai	
2011	Black Rock Shooter: The Game	MZMA/Mazuma	
2011	Everybody's Golf 6	Yamato	
2011	Final Fantasy Type-0	King	
2011	Grand Knights History	King Fausel	
2011	J-Stars Victory VS	Gintoki, Joseph Joestar, Switch	
2011	Ōgon Musōkyoku	Ronove	
2011	Ōgon Musōkyoku X	Ronove	
2011	Tales of Xillia	Alvin	PS3 in 2011, PS5, Xbox Series X/S, Nintendo Switch, and Windows in 2025
2011	The Reminiscence of Haruhi Suzumiya	Kyon	
2011	Umineko no Naku Koro ni Chiru: Shinjitsu to Gensō no Nocturne	Ronove	
2011	Warriors Orochi 3	Kiyomasa Kato	Also Ultimate in 2014
2012	2nd Super Robot Wars Original Generation	Brooklyn Luckfield	
2012	BlazBlue: Chronophantasma	Ragna The Bloodedge, Makoto's Tail	
2012	Chaos Rings II	Orlando Crichton	
2012	Danganronpa 2: Goodbye Despair	Gundam Tanaka	
2012	Fire Emblem Awakening	Chrom	
2012	Fist of the North Star: Ken's Rage 2	Shin	
2012	Genso Suikoden: Tsumugareshi Hyakunen no Toki	Leopherias 13	
2012	Kamen Rider: Battride War	Kivat-bat the 3rd, Kivat-bat the 2nd, Kivat-bat the 4th	
2012	Ōgon Musōkyoku CROSS	Ronove	
2012	Rune Factory 4	Dylas	
2012	Skullgirls	Big Band	Japanese dub
2012	Shin Megami Tensei: Devil Summoner: Soul Hackers 3DS	Raidou/Raido Kuzunoha the XIV, EX Dungeon Bonus Boss	
2012	Tales of Xillia 2	Alvin	
2012	Time and Eternity	Ricardo	
2013	JoJo's Bizarre Adventure: All Star Battle	Joseph Joestar	Also R
2013	Killer Is Dead	David	
2013	Mind Zero	Takanashi Kei	
2013	Norn9	Muroboshi Ron	
2013	Umineko no Naku Koro ni: Majo to Suiri no Rondo	Ronove	
2014	J-Stars Victory VS	Gintoki Sakata, Joseph Joestar, Switch	
2014	Granblue Fantasy	Drang and Paris	
2014	Metal Gear Solid V: Ground Zeroes	Kazuhira Miller	
2014	Phantasy Star Online 2	Kotoshiro	
2014	Samurai Warriors 4	Kiyomasa Kato	
2014	Sol Trigger	Valter	
2014	Super Smash Bros. for Nintendo 3DS and Wii U	Chrom, Takamaru	
2015	BlazBlue: Central Fiction	Ragna The Bloodedge	
2015	Closers	J	Japanese Version
2015	Final Fantasy Type-0 HD	King	
2015	Fate/Grand Order	Goetia	
2015	Guilty Gear Xrd Revelator	That Man	
2015	Tokyo Mirage Sessions ♯FE	Chrom	Also in the 2020 expanded version Tokyo Mirage Sessions #FE Encore
2015	JoJo's Bizarre Adventure: Eyes of Heaven	Young Joseph Joestar	
2015	Metal Gear Solid V: The Phantom Pain	Kazuhira Miller	
2015	Project X Zone 2	Axel Stone, Chrom Break	
2015	Ikémen Sengoku: Romances Across Time	Nobunaga Oda	
2016	Genkai Tokki: Seven Pirates	Otton	
2016	Gundam Breaker 3	Kadomatsu	
2016	Persona 5	Yusuke Kitagawa, Goemon (Persona awakening voice)	
2016	Cheer Boys!!	Wataru Mizoguchi	
2016	Shadowverse	Rowen Dragespear	
2016	Sakamoto desu ga?	Atsushi Maeda	
2016	Ryū ga Gotoku: Kiwami	Shinji Tanaka	
2016	Zero Escape: Zero Time Dilemma	Carlos	
2016	League Of Legends	Yasuo	
2016	Saint Seiya: Cosmo Fantasy	Cosmo of Shadow Cloth (Shadow Saint)	
2017	Kingdom Hearts HD 2.8 Final Chapter Prologue	Master of Masters	
2017	Fire Emblem Heroes	Chrom, Oliver	
2017	Fire Emblem Warriors	Chrom	
2017	Captain Tsubasa Dream Team	Gakuto Igawa	
2017	Onmyōji	Kurodōji	
2018	Gintama Rumble	Gintoki Sakata	
2018	BlazBlue: Cross Tag Battle	Ragna the Bloodedge	
2018	The King of Fighters All Star	Planner Ryu, Gintoki Sakata	
2018	PopoloCrois Story Narcia's Tears and the Fairy's Flute	Toto Gonzales (Gon)	
2018	Super Smash Bros. Ultimate	Chrom, Yusuke Kitagawa, Takamaru	
2018	Epic Seven	Basar, Desert Jewel Basar, Hurado	
2019	Our World is Ended	Sekai Owari	
2019	Mr Love: Queen's Choice	Victor / Lizeyan / Zen	Japanese Version
2019	Catherine: Full Body	Yusuke Kitagawa	
2019	The Seven Deadly Sins: Grand Cross	Escanor	
2019	Pokémon Masters	Senri	
2019	Death Stranding	The Wandering MC	Japanese version
2019	Sakura Wars	Reiji Shiba	
2019	Persona 5 Royal	Yusuke Kitagawa	
2019	Dragon Quest XI S: Echoes of an Elusive Age - Definitive Edition	Vince Vanquish	
2020	Dragalia Lost	Chrom, Nevin	
2020	Kingdom Hearts III Re Mind	Master of Masters	
2020	Final Fantasy VII Remake	Aniyan Kunyan	
2020	Persona 5 Strikers	Yusuke Kitagawa	
2020	The Last of Us: Part II	Jesse	
2021	Famicom Detective Club: The Missing Heir	Amachi	
2021	Guilty Gear Strive	Asuka R. Kreutz, Asuka R♯	
2021	Mobile Legends: Adventure / Akashic Chronicle	Tigreal, Valir (Verus)	Japanese version
2021	Sin Chronicle	Gaust	
2021	Super Robot Wars 30	Edge Sainklaus	
2021	Shin Megami Tensei V	Shohei Yakumo	
2022	Counter:Side	Dominic King Reginald (Replacer King)	
2022	Anonymous;Code	Cross Yumikawa	
2022	Goddess of Victory: Nikke	Andersen	Japanese version
2022	Live A Live	Tribesman, Hoi Restaurateur, Barkeep, Hayate, Jackie Iaukea, Tadashi Tadokoro, Captain Square, Minister, Lucretius	
2022	Dragon Quest Treasures	Long John Silverbones, Monsters	
2022	tERRORbane	the developer	Japanese version
2022	Soul Hackers 2	Madame Ginko	
2023	Octopath Traveler II	Kazan	
2023	Street Fighter 6	JP	
2023	Crymachina	Anthropos	
2023	Persona 5 Tactica	Yusuke Kitagawa	
2023	Goblin Slayer Another Adventurer: Nightmare Feast	Lizard Priest	
2023	TEVI	Professor Zema	
2024	Final Fantasy VII Rebirth	Aniyan Kunyan	
2024	JoJo's Bizarre Adventure: Last Survivor	Joseph Joestar	
2025	Death Stranding 2: On the Beach	Dollman	
2025	Ratatan	Fortrun	Upcoming title
2025	Rusty Rabbit	Jed	
2025	Genshin Impact	Varka	
2025	Ghost of Yōtei	The Spider	
2025	Kemono Teatime	Guimauve	

=== Tokusatsu ===
Year	Title	Role	Notesotes
2008	Kamen Rider Kiva	Kivat-Bat the 3rd, Kivat-Bat the 2nd (Eps 37 – 48), Kivat-Bat the 4th (Ep 48)	
2008	Kamen Rider Kiva: King of the Castle in the Demon World	Kivat-Bat the 3rd	Movie
2008	Saraba Kamen Rider Den-O: Final Countdown	Shadow Imagin	Movie
2009	Kamen Rider Decade	Kivat-Bat the 3rd	Ep. 4, 5
2011	Kaizoku Sentai Gokaiger	Bounty Hunter Kiaido	Ep. 28
2012	Tokumei Sentai Go-Busters	Drillloid II	Ep. 18
2013	Ultraman Ginga	Ultraman Ginga (Ep. 10, 11), Dark Lugiel (Ep. 11)	Ep. 10, 11
2014	Kamen Rider Gaim	Demushu	Eps. 21, 23, 24, 26 – 29, 31, 32
2014	Kamen Rider Gaim: Great Soccer Battle! Golden Fruits Cup!	Demushu	Movie
2014	Ultraman Ginga S	Ultraman Ginga (Ep 16), Dark Lugiel (Ep 15, 16)	Ep. 15, 16
2019	Kamen Rider Zi-O	Kamen Rider Ginga	Ep. 35, 36
2020	Mashin Sentai Kiramager: Episode ZERO	King Oradin, Narrator, Kiramager's Arsenal Equipments	Movie
2020	Mashin Sentai Kiramager	King Oradin / Mashin Oradin, Narrator, Kiramager's Arsenal Equipments	
2021	Mashin Sentai Kiramager the Movie: Be Bop Dream	King Oradin, Kiramager's Arsenal Equipments	Movie
2021	Saber + Zenkaiger: Superhero Senki	Kiramager's Arsenal Equipments, Kivat-bat the 3rd	Movie, voice uncredited only
2025–26	No.1 Sentai Gozyuger	Mr. Shining Knife	
2027	Danganronpa 2x2	Gundham Tanaka	

=== Drama CD ===
- Maid Sama!: Usui Takumi
- Metal Gear Solid: Peace Walker – Heiwa to Kazuhira no Blues: Kazuhira Miller
- Togainu no Chi: Keisuke
- Aitsu no Daihonmei: Yamanaka
- Gakuen Alice Doki Doki☆Drama CD: Akira Tonouchi

=== Dubbing ===
==== Live-action ====
Title	Role	Dubbing actor	Other notes	Source
Brain Games	Keegan-Michael Key			
The Captain	Willi Herold	Max Hubacher		
Crisis on Earth-X	Ray Palmer / Atom	Brandon Routh		
Deadpool & Wolverine	Cowboypool	Matthew McConaughey		
Dolittle	James	Jason Mantzoukas		
Eternals	Kingo	Kumail Nanjiani		
Everest	Guy Cotter	Sam Worthington		
The Gilded Age	George Russell	Morgan Spector		
The Huntsman: Winter's War	Eric	Chris Hemsworth		
Jexi	Phil	Adam DeVine		
The King of Fighters	Kyo Kusanagi	Sean Faris		
Legends of Tomorrow	Ray Palmer / Atom	Brandon Routh		
Mars	Ben Sawyer	Ben Cotton		
Masters of the Universe	Skeletor	Jared Leto		
The Medium	Santi	Boonsong Nakphoo		
Men in Black: International	Agent H	Chris Hemsworth		
Monster Hunter	Lincoln	T.I.		
Morbius	Milo	Matt Smith		
Obi-Wan Kenobi	Haja Estree	Kumail Nanjiani		
Our Times	Hsu Tai-yu	Darren Wang		
Pacific Rim	Raleigh Becket	Charlie Hunnam		
Pawn Shop Chronicles	Ricky	Brendan Fraser		
Power Rangers	Billy Cranston / Blue Ranger	RJ Cyler		
Rebel Moon	Kai	Charlie Hunnam		
Resident Evil	Wade	Griffin Newman		
RRR	Komaram Bheem	N. T. Rama Rao Jr.		
Running Wild with Bear Grylls	Keegan-Michael Key			
Scorpion	Walter O'Brien	Elyes Gabel		
SEAL Team	Raymond "Ray" Perry	Neil Brown Jr.		
Shazam!	Shazam	Djimon Hounsou		
Shazam! Fury of the Gods	Shazam	Djimon Hounsou		

==== Animation ====
Title	Role	Other notes	Source
Adventure Time	Braco		
Calamity, a Childhood of Martha Jane Cannary	Abraham		
The Emoji Movie	Hi-5		
Garfield's Pet Force	Garfield		
Hoppers	Amphibian King		
The Legend of Hei	Tianhu		
Transformers One	Jazz		
White Snake	He Zhang		
The Willoughbys	The Cat		
Wish Dragon	Long		

Other Media

Year	Title	Role	Source
2023	The final chapter of the Human Rabbit-fication Plan has begun! [Stream]	Usada Pekora	

== Awards ==
Year	Award	Category	Work/Recipient	Result	Source
2008	Society for the Promotion of Japanese Animation Award	Best Voice Actor (Japanese)	Kyon (The Melancholy of Haruhi Suzumiya)	Won	
2009	3rd Seiyu Awards	Best Actor in supporting roles	Kivat-bat the 3rd (Kamen Rider Kiva); Leon Mishima (Macross Frontier); Raven (Hakushaku to Yosei)	Won	
2013	Newtype Anime Awards	Best Actor		Won	
2016	3rd Aniradio Awards	Best Male Radio	Tomokazu Sugita's AniGera! Di-doon	Won	
