= Kodomo no Jikan =

Japanese manga series and its franchise

- Cover of the first manga volume featuring Rin Kokonoe

こどものじかん
- Genre: Romantic comedy
- Manga
- Written by: Kaworu Watashiya
- Published by: Futabasha
- English publisher: NA: Digital Manga
- Magazine: Comic High!
- Original run: May 22, 2005 – April 22, 2013
- Volumes: 13
- Original video animation

What You Gave Me
- Directed by: Eiji Suganuma
- Written by: Mari Okada
- Music by: Masara Nishida
- Studio: Studio Barcelona
- Released: September 12, 2007
- Runtime: 30 minutes
- Anime television series
- Directed by: Eiji Suganuma
- Written by: Mari Okada
- Music by: Masara Nishida
- Studio: Studio Barcelona
- Original network: Chiba Television Broadcasting; Kyoto Broadcasting System
- Original run: October 12, 2007 – December 28, 2007
- Episodes: 12
- Original video animation

Kodomo no Jikan 2 Gakki
- Directed by: Eiji Suganuma
- Written by: Mari Okada
- Music by: Masara Nishida
- Studio: Studio Barcelona
- Released: January 21, 2009 – July 24, 2009
- Episodes: 4
- Original video animation

Kodomo no Jikan: A Child's Summer Time
- Directed by: Eiji Suganuma
- Written by: Mari Okada
- Music by: Masara Nishida
- Studio: Studio Barcelona
- Released: January 21, 2011
- Runtime: 25 minutes
- Light novel
- Written by: Kaworu Watashiya
- Published by: Futabasha
- Imprint: Action Comics Comic High's Brand
- Published: January 12, 2012

Kodomo no Jikan (Japanese: こどものじかん; "A Child's Time") is a Japanese manga series written and illustrated by Kaworu Watashiya. The story revolves around a grade school teacher named Daisuke Aoki, whose main problem is that one of his students, Rin Kokonoe, has a crush on him. It was serialized between May 2005 and April 2013 in Futabasha's Comic High! magazine and is compiled in 13 volumes. At one time, an English-language version of the manga was licensed by Seven Seas Entertainment for distribution in North America under the title Nymphet, but they ultimately decided not to publish it due to controversies over its content. It was then relicensed by Digital Manga, who released the series in English through e-book.

A 12-episode anime adaptation of the series aired in Japan between October and December 2007. While content of the broadcast version was sometimes heavily censored, the DVD releases of the individual episodes remain unedited. A second anime season was released as four original video animation episodes between January and July 2009. A third original anime DVD was released in January 2011.

== Plot ==
Kodomo no Jikan is centered around 23-year-old Daisuke Aoki, who has just landed his first teaching job as a grade school instructor at Futatsubashi Elementary School (双ツ橋 小学校, Futatsubashi Shōgakkō). He is placed in charge of Class 3–1, where one of his students, a mischievously precocious nine-year-old girl by the name of Rin Kokonoe, develops a crush on him and proclaims herself as Aoki's girlfriend. At first he dismisses it as harmless, but she aggressively pursues her efforts to be with him. Aoki is in shock when she makes sexual advances towards him, thus leading him to believe that Rin comes from a troubled family. Aoki finds out that Rin's mother had died and she is living with a cousin whose flashbacks lead to violent outbursts.

== Characters ==
Kodomo no Jikan main characters: Mimi (left), Rin (center), and Kuro (right).

Rin Kokonoe (九重 りん, Kokonoe Rin)
Voiced by: Eri Kitamura
Rin is a young girl in third grade who has an intense crush on her teacher Daisuke. She has a mischievous nature and proclaims herself to be Daisuke's girlfriend. She goes to great lengths to make him fall in love with her, crossing moral and legal boundaries many times. Some of these tactics include taking advantage of Daisuke's inability to respond to her forcible advances by threatening to scream that he is trying to molest her, even though she initiated them. Despite Rin's mischievous nature she has shown herself to care deeply for her friends and family, going to any length to defend them. Much of her bad behavior is a result of trying to hide the traces of the vulnerable little girl she used to be as a result of a tragedy in her past. Rin ages throughout the story, but worries that Daisuke won't ever see her as an adult.

Kuro Kagami (鏡 黒, Kagami Kuro)
Voiced by: Kei Shindō
Kuro Kagami is one of Rin's closest friends, and frequent "partner in crime" due to their similar levels of sexual knowledge. She is openly contemptuous of Aoki due to his inability to consistently enforce discipline in the classroom, and her belief that he is a lolicon. She is also aware that he is a rival for Rin's affection which infuriates her more as she has a crush on Rin. Kuro has a kinder side to her though as she manages to befriend both Rin and Mimi and is very protective of them. The apparent wealth of the Kagami family allows her to indulge her obsession with following the latest fashion trends. Kuro often wears clothing in the Gothic Lolita style, sometimes combined with nekomimi ears and tail. Kuro's overall distrust of men stems from her mother's divorce from her cheating husband.

Mimi Usa (宇佐 美々, Usa Mimi)
Voiced by: Mai Kadowaki
A quiet, bespectacled young girl whose knowledge of adult and sexual matters is inversely proportional to her level of physical development. Mimi Usa struggles to establish a sense of self-identity as most of her characteristics emphasize qualities about herself which she is uncomfortable with. She is emotionally fragile, and increasingly depressed due to her abilities that her friends don't seem to possess, such as being well-endowed among others. Mimi is also a shy person, but opens up over time from her friendship with Rin and Kuro. She eventually develops a secret crush on Rin's cousin Reiji as he recognizes much of who he once was in her. Reiji tells her to never lose hope that she would one day find someone who would understand and love her, and also encourages her to not succumb to anger and hatred at the world like he did.

Daisuke Aoki (青木 大介, Aoki Daisuke)
Voiced by: Junji Majima
Daisuke Aoki, is a freshly graduated 23-year-old elementary school instructor who has been placed in charge of the third grade class 3-1. Many of the idealistic notions he holds about his job, however, are quickly put to the test as he finds himself dealing with unexpected, complex situations, not the least of which is having a shamelessly flirtatious nine-year-old doing everything in her power to win his affections. Aoki's complete lack of previous teaching experience sometimes makes it hard for him to control his class or maintain their interest, a situation further complicated by the ease with which he is flustered by Rin's sexual innuendo and Kuro's remarks about his status as a virgin. His relatively normal, uneventful childhood also complicates his efforts to quickly and easily grasp the hardships faced by some of his students, though this has in no way discouraged him from trying or diminished his desire to help them. In fact, his seemingly unshakable enthusiasm, hands-on attitude, and emotional attachment to his students has often caused him to butt heads with the more traditional Sae Shirai. Almost from the beginning, Aoki has shared a special bond with Rin, one which has deepened and become so complex over time that even he, at one point, was terrified of Rin and began to fear her, and at another point, he began to ponder his feelings toward Rin, mainly to see her as only a "child". Regardless of the nature of his love for Rin, his protectiveness of her has led him to become increasingly suspicious and mistrustful of the motives of her guardian and cousin, Reiji Kokonoe.

Kyōko Hōin (宝院 京子, Hōin Kyōko)
Voiced by: Ryōko Tanaka
A young, well-endowed teacher who is Aoki's colleague and friend at work. She tries to care for Aoki as he is still new to the job, and also has a crush on him. She has asked him out on several occasions, only to be interrupted every time by some incident, usually involving Rin. Due to her busty physique, she is nicknamed "Boin" (a pun on her name "Hoin").

Reiji Kokonoe (九重 レイジ, Kokonoe Reiji)
Voiced by: Tomokazu Sugita
Rin's first cousin once removed, and guardian. He and Rin share a very close relationship, almost like a father and daughter or a brother and sister. For a short period of time, he was in love with Rin's mother, his own cousin Aki, before she died. After her death he became Rin's official guardian. He is very protective of Rin and does not seem to like Aoki at all because of Rin's affection towards him, which makes Reiji very jealous.

Aki Kokonoe (九重 秋, Kokonoe Aki)
Voiced by: Yuri Amano
Rin's mother, who died of lung cancer when Rin was very young. She revealed to Reiji that the father of Rin wanted Aki to have an abortion, but she refused to do it. She falls in love with Reiji and develops a relationship with him. She soon developed a cough, and was diagnosed with lung cancer which threatened her life, and for the sake of Rin and Reiji, she kept her disease hidden until it was too late to cure it. She entrusted him with the care of Rin after she died.

== Media ==
=== Manga ===
The first chapter of a two-part "pilot" for Kodomo no Jikan appeared in the premiere issue of Futabasha's seinen manga magazine Comic High! on March 2, 2004. The successful reception of the pilot prompted the creator, Kaworu Watashiya, to rework the title into a full-fledged manga. Serialization began a little over a year later in Comic High! on May 22, 2005, and ran until April 22, 2013. Futabasha published 13 tankōbon volumes between December 12, 2005, and June 12, 2013. While the aforementioned pilot is not considered part of the ongoing series' canon in spite of the shared name, largely identical main cast, and common central theme, many situations and ideas initially introduced there were revisited in the eventual manga series—and thus incorporated into official continuity—albeit in (slightly) altered or expanded form.

Digital Manga has licensed the series for publication in North America, and originally planned to publish it in omnibus format under its Project-H imprint. Digital Manga later launched a Kickstarter to publish the series in five omnibus volumes and one additional volume under its newly launched PeCChi imprint. The project reached its US$157,000 goal on July 3, 2016, however retail release dates for the series were yet to be determined. In all the project raised a total of US$185,725 making it the most funded graphic novel project ever on Kickstarter at the time. Digital Manga president Hikaru Sasahara later stated in March 2018 that the company had run into a "weakened" financial situation. Sasahara apologized for the delays which included the Kodomo no Jikan manga still not being fulfilled. The series has since been released in English via e-book format with print editions still on a TBA date.

=== Audio dramas ===
An Internet radio show called Kojika Radio (こじからじお), hosted by Lantis Web Radio, Beat Net Radio!, and Kodomo no Jikan's official website, originally had a pre-broadcast on August 31, 2007, but began regular weekly broadcasts every Friday starting on September 7, 2007. It has three hosts—Eri Kitamura, Kei Shindō, and Mai Kadowaki, who played Rin Kokonoe, Kuro Kagami, and Mimi Usa in the anime, respectively—and was produced by Bandai Visual and Lantis. There are three corners on the show, which is used mainly to promote the anime version. A CD entitled Kojika Radio on CD: Aki Ensoku Hen (こじからじお on CD ～秋の遠足編～) was released by Lantis on November 21, 2007. It contained an opening and ending talk as well as seven more tracks from the Internet radio show. A drama CD was released on January 9, 2008, by Lantis.

=== Anime ===
Comparison between the TV broadcast (top) and DVD (bottom) versions of episode one

A thirty-minute, uncensored, single-episode original video animation (OVA) was released on September 12, 2007, available both on the anime's official website and in a limited-edition version bundled with the fourth volume of the manga. The anime series, directed by Eiji Suganuma, written by Mari Okada, and produced by the animation studio Studio Barcelona, was originally scheduled to premiere in Japan on October 11, 2007, but two television stations—TV Saitama and Mie TV—removed it from their broadcast schedules. In an official press release, TV Saitama stated that their decision was heavily influenced by the then-recent capture of Takayuki Hosoda, a notorious Japanese child pornographer who was revealed to be an elementary school vice principal. Plans for Chiba TV and KBS Kyoto to air the series remained unchanged, and the anime premiered on Japanese television on October 12, 2007, running for twelve episodes until December 28, 2007. However, some of its content suffered censorship to varying degrees, from animated panels obscuring parts of the screen and sound effects being used to "bleep" out dialogue in some instances to full suppression of both audio and video in others. The uncensored version of the anime series is available on DVD in six volumes containing two episodes each. The DVD volumes were released between December 21, 2007 and May 23, 2008.

A second anime season was announced, and a promotional video of this season was included with a special edition of the fifth manga volume released on July 11, 2008. This season was released in original video animation format over four episodes between January 21 and July 24, 2009. A third anime adaptation was announced on the cover of the manga's eighth volume in May 2010, and was released on January 21, 2011.

=== Music ===
Four pieces of theme music are used for the anime television series: one opening theme and three ending ones. The opening theme, used in all episodes except the twelfth, which did not have an opening theme, is "Rettsu! Ohime-sama Dakko" (れっつ!おひめさまだっこ) by Eri Kitamura, Kei Shindō, and Mai Kadowaki, the voice actresses for Rin Kokonoe, Kuro Kagami, and Mimi Usa, respectively. The first ending theme, used for all but two episodes, is "Hanamaru Sensation" (ハナマル☆センセイション, Hanamaru☆Senseishon) by Little Non; the second ending theme, used only for episode six, is "Yasashii" (やさしい) by Chata; the third and final ending theme, used only in episode twelve and which was also the opening theme for the OVA, is "Otome Chikku Shoshinsha desu" (オトメチック初心者でーす), once again sung by the trio of Kitamura, Shindō, and Kadowaki. The maxi single for the opening theme was released on October 24, 2007, by Lantis, and the one for the first ending theme was released on October 12, 2007, also by Lantis. The anime's original soundtrack was released on January 23, 2008.

The OVA's opening theme, the previously mentioned "Otome Chikku Shoshinsha desu" (オトメチック初心者でーす) and was included on the same maxi single as "Rettsu! Ohime-sama Dakko" as a B-side track. The ending theme, "Aijō◎Education" (愛情◎エデュケイション) by Little Non, appeared on the same maxi single as "Hanamaru Sensation" as a B-side track. Three character song albums were released by Lantis on December 26, 2007, for the characters Rin Kokonoe, Kuro Kagami, and Mimi Usa, featuring singing and voicework by their respective voice actresses.

The second season's opening theme is "Guilty Future" by Kitamura. The ending theme for all but episode three is "1,2,3 Day" by Little Non. The ending theme for episode three is "Yoridori Princess" (よりどりプリンセス) by Kitamura, Shindō, and Kadowaki. An album was released by Lantis on January 27, 2010, containing all the music used in the anime.

== Criticism and controversy ==
Kodomo no Jikan was originally licensed for distribution in North America in 2006 by the Los Angeles–based company Seven Seas Entertainment, the first volume of the manga having been slated for an early 2007 release. According to Futabasha, the title of Nymphet was selected for the English language version at the suggestion—and later insistence—of the original creator, Kaworu Watashiya. The manga, however, soon became the target of controversy after questions were raised about its appropriateness for North American audiences. In a written statement, the president of Seven Seas Entertainment, Jason DeAngelis, observed that "those who are speaking out against Nymphet seem to be disturbed by the relationship between two characters in the story, namely an elementary school student and her adult teacher" and decided to delay the release of the manga so that he could "have an open dialogue with the large book chains and other vendors." The title was subsequently dropped as a result of these concerns, with DeAngelis saying that it was "not appropriate for Seven Seas to publish Nymphet," and that it would cancel its release of the manga.

In a second statement regarding Nymphet, DeAngelis explained some of the reasoning behind the decision to cancel the series. He stated that, "my primary reason for canceling Nymphet is due to my recent realization that later volumes in the series can not be considered appropriate for the US market by any reasonable standard." He also cited the fact that, "[the vendors] began dropping their orders left and right, so their opinion on this matter became pretty clear cut." Specifically, DeAngelis stated that, during his re-review of later Kodomo no Jikan anthologies, he discovered content that he regarded as highly unsuitable for publication. The pages cited were of a scene of the main characters, Rin Kokonoe and Daisuke Aoki, stuck in a room with freezing temperatures. The two embrace in an effort to stay warm by sharing body heat, and Rin takes the opportunity to rub her crotch against Aoki's, almost causing him to get an erection.

On June 7, 2007, Kaworu Watashiya posted a blog entry on the Kodomo no Jikan controversy in the United States. She commented that, "what I heard about 'issues in volume 2 and later' made me realize the differences in the cultures between the countries." The author went on to cite instances in later volumes that showed intimate relationships between cousins and a bath scene with a child and adult, going on to say that, "my honest feeling is, 'It's unfortunate, but what can I do?'"

Former manga translator Toren Smith commented on the issue in favor of its content, accusing people who support the reverse gender scenario in series such as Negima! Magister Negi Magi of being hypocritical. Anime News Network writer Zac Bertschy expressed complete disapproval of the content present in Kodomo no Jikan, categorizing it as lolicon and "comic book kiddie porn". He expressed dismay over Seven Seas Entertainment's decision in licensing the manga, and hoped that nobody would buy it once it is out for sale.

== See also ==
- Book censorship in the United States
- Lolita
