= Kaworu Watashiya =

Japanese manga artist

Kaworu Watashiya (私屋カヲル, Watashiya Kaworu; born 3 January 1972) is a Japanese manga artist from Tokyo, Japan. She is notable for the creation of Kodomo no Jikan, the first of her works selected to be translated into English – though the publication of the English version was cancelled by the licensee, Seven Seas Entertainment, due to concerns as to North American reaction to controversial content, and was never released. However, in late 2016 it was picked up by digitalmanga, and funded for translation through a Kickstarter campaign, with the digital version readily available on Project Hentai. It is also the first of her works to be adapted into an anime.

== Works ==
- Chibi to Boku (ちびとぼく) 2000-2007
- Cotton 200% (コットン200%, Kotton nihyaku pāsento) 1996-1997
- Dame Yome Nikki (だめよめにっき) 2008,2010
- Inu to Ojousama (犬とお嬢様) 1993-1994
- Kaworu to Yui no Ikkai Yarashite (カヲルとゆいのいっかいやらして) 1999-2001
- Kodomo no Jikan (こどものじかん) 2005-2013
- Meganēchan (めがねーちゃん) 2009
- Ōedo Musume Ninja (おーえど娘忍者) 1997-1998
- Onekosama ga Kita (おネコさまが来た) 1994
- Papa wa Dandy (パパはダンディー, Papa wa Dandī) 1999
- Pink no Kobushi (ピンクの拳, Pinku no Kobushi) 1999
- Sakura Saichae (さくら咲いちゃえ) 2003
- Seishun Binta! (青春ビンタ!)2001-2004
- Shōnen Sanpakugan Series (少年三白眼シリーズ, Shōnen Sanpakugan Shirīzu) 1992-1993
- Yoake no Yowakkī (夜明けのヨワッキー) 1995-1996
