= Child's Play =

Child's Play may refer to:

== Film ==
=== Horror franchise ===
- Child's Play (franchise), an American slasher horror film series
  - Child's Play (1988 film), a supernatural slasher film and the first film in the series
  - Child's Play (2019 film), a reboot of the 1988 film

=== Films ===
- Child's Play (1954 film), a sci-fi film
- Child's Play (1972 film), a film directed by Sidney Lumet with James Mason based on the play
- Child's Play (1992 film), a German film
- Bachchon Ka Khel ("Child's Play"), a 1946 Indian film
- Love Me If You Dare (French title Jeux d'enfants i.e. Child's Play), a 2003 French-Belgian film
- Juego de Niños ("Child's Play"), a 1995 Spanish horror film

== Television ==
=== Episodes ===
- "Child's Play", Absentia season 1, episode 9 (2017)
- "Child's Play", Alan Carr's Epic Gameshow series 3, episode 4 (2022)
- "Child's Play", All Saints season 4, episode 39 (2001)
- "Child's Play", Amen season 5, episode 3 (1990)
- "Child's Play", The Apprentice (British) series 1, episode 2 (2005)
- "Child's Play", Boy Girl Dog Cat Mouse Cheese season 3, episode 40 (2024)
- "Child's Play", Blue Heelers season 5, episode 30 (1998)
- "Child's Play", Castle season 7, episode 4 (2014)
- "Child's Play", Casualty series 7, episode 22 (1993)
- "Child's Play", Centurions episode 14 (1986)
- "Child's Play", The Client episode 10 (1995)
- "Child's Play", CSI: NY season 4, episode 11 (2007)
- "Child's Play", Dalziel and Pascoe series 3, episode 2 (1998)
- "Child's Play", The Fall Guy season 1, episode 19 (1982)
- "Child's Play", The Flash (1990) episode 7 (1990)
- "Child's Play", Floor Is Lava season 3, episode 5 (2022)
- "Child's Play", Giuliana and Bill season 4, episode 4 (2010)
- "Child's Play", Hammer House of Mystery and Suspense episode 3 (1984)
- "Child's Play", Heartbeat series 10, episode 8 (2000)
- "Child's Play", Hotel season 3, episode 14 (1986)
- "Child's Play", In the Heat of the Night season 7, episode 1 (1993)
- "Child's Play", The Jungle Book (2010) season 2, episode 31 (2016)
- "Child's Play", Laverne & Shirley season 6, episode 22 (1981)
- "Child's Play", Legion of Super Heroes season 1, episode 10 (2007)
- "Child's Play", Mama's Family season 4, episode 8 (1987)
- "Child's Play", Merseybeat series 2, episode 3 (2002)
- "Child's Play", Miami Vice season 4, episode 5 (1987)
- "Child's Play", Murdoch Mysteries season 1, episode 10 (2008)
- "Child's Play", Ninjago: Masters of Spinjitzu season 2, episode 5 (2012)
- "Child's Play", The Omega Factor episode 6 (1979)
- "Child's Play", Point of Entry season 1, episode 8 (2011)
- "Child's Play", Sailor Moon season 2, episode 34 (1995)
- "Child's Play", Scott Baio Is 45...and Single episode 5 (2007)
- "Child's Play", Secret Army series 1, episode 4 (1977)
- "Child's Play", She's the Sheriff episode 10 (1987)
- "Child's Play", Silk Stalkings season 7, episode 10 (1997)
- "Child's Play", Sister, Sister season 5, episode 6 (1997)
- "Child's Play", Spenser: For Hire season 3, episode 9 (1987)
- "Child's Play", Star Trek: Voyager season 6, episode 19 (2000)
- "Child's Play", Static Shock season 1, episode 7 (2000)
- "Child's Play", Tanner '88 episode 6 (1988)
- "Child's Play", Terrahawks series 3, episode 6 (1986)
- "Child's Play", Thirty-Minute Theatre series 3, episode 17 (1968)
- "Child's Play", Thriller season 1, episode 2 (1960)
- "Child's Play", Thunderbirds 2086 episode 7 (1982)
- "Child's Play", Time Squad season 2, episode 9b (2002)
- "Child's Play", Top Design season 1, episode 2 (2007)
- "Child's Play", Totally Spies season 1, episode 5 (2001)
- "Child's Play", The Transformers season 2, episode 30 (1985)
- "Child's Play", Vitthal Teedi episode 1 (2021)
- "Child's Play", Work of Art: The Next Great Artist season 1, episode 7 (2010)
- "Child's Play", Yu-Gi-Oh! Duel Monsters season 5, episode 5 (2004)

=== Shows ===
- Child's Play (game show), a 1982 game show
  - Child's Play (British game show), a British game show based on a U.S. format of the same name
  - Child's Play (Australian game show), an Australian game show based on a U.S. show of the same name

== Literature ==
- Child's Play, an 1852 children's book by Eleanor Vere Boyle
- Child's Play (Ichiyo Higuchi novella), an 1895–96 novella by Ichiyō Higuchi
- "Child's Play", a 1947 science fiction short story by William Tenn
- Child's Play, a 1964 novel by Ursula Curtiss
- Child's Play (play), a 1970 stage play by Robert Marasco
- Child's Play, a 1976 novel by Warren Murphy and Richard Sapir; the twenty-third installment in The Destroyer novel series
- Child's Play (novella), a 1981 novella by David Malouf
- Child's Play, a 1985 novel by Andrew Neiderman
- Child's Play, a 1987 novel by Reginald Hill; the ninth installment in the Dalziel and Pascoe series
- Child's Play, a 1992 novel by Bethany Campbell
- Child's Play (comics), a 1994 Marvel Comics crossover
- Child's Play, a 2008 novel by Carmen Posadas
- Child's Play (Kia Abdullah novel), a 2009 novel by Kia Abdullah
- Child's Play, a 2014 novel by Bill Myers
- Child's Play, a 2019 novel by Angela Marsons
- Child's Play, a 2019 novel by Danielle Steel

== Music ==
- Child's Play (band), a hard rock band from Baltimore, Maryland, USA
- "Child's Play", a song by When in Rome from When in Rome (1988)
- "Childs Play", a song by SZA featuring Chance the Rapper from Z (2014)
- "Childs Play", a song by Drake from Views (2016)
- "Child's Play", a song by Tones and I from Welcome to the Madhouse (2021)

== Other ==
- Child's Play (charity), a children's charity
- Child's Play (candy), a brand of candy assortments
- Child's Play (module), an adventure module published in 1989 for the Dungeons & Dragons fantasy role-playing game
- Childs Play (website), a defunct child pornography website captured by law enforcement in 2016 and shut down September 2017
- Children's games
