= Yu-Gi-Oh! Capsule Monsters =

- No. of episodes: 12 (Note: In the English Dub, Yu-Gi-Oh! Capsule Monsters takes place between the Grand Championship and Dawn of the Duel story arcs, and as such, it counts as a part of Season 5 of Yu-Gi-Oh! Duel Monsters.)

Release
- Original network: Fox (4Kids TV)
- Original release: September 9 – November 25, 2006

Yu-Gi-Oh! Capsule Monsters, also known in Japan as Yu-Gi-Oh! Duel Monsters ALEX (Japanese: 遊☆戯☆王デュエルモンスターズ ALEX(アレックス), Hepburn: Yū Gi Ō Dyueru Monsutāzu Arekkusu), is a mini-series commissioned and produced by 4Kids Entertainment in the United States, and animated by Studio Gallop in Japan (with uncredited assistance from Dong Woo Animation in Korea) shortly after the conclusion of the original series. This miniseries is an addendum to the first half of the final season of the anime, taking place after the Grand Championships but before the climactic Dawn of the Duel arc. A short-lived board game, Yu-Gi-Oh! Capsule Monsters Collectible Figure Game, was created based on this mini-series.

== Episode list ==
No.	Title	Original release date
1	"Getting Played"	September 9, 2006
Yugi Muto keeps having nightmares of being attacked by a shadowy fiend with many arms. When Yugi wakes up and heads off to school, he wonders where his grandpa could be as he had gone on a secret expedition a week earlier and had not returned yet. Joey Wheeler ends up winning a trip to India and invites Yugi, Téa Gardner and Tristan Taylor to come along. On their way to India, their plane crashes and they decide to look around the area while the pilots wait for help to arrive. They come across Dr. Alex Brisbane, a colleague of Yugi's grandfather, Solomon Muto. He tells the gang that Solomon has disappeared and shows them a giant pyramid that they had been exploring together. Dr. Brisbane leads the gang to a giant map which Joey steps on it and disappears. Yugi, Téa, and Tristan go after Joey and find themselves transported into another world with devices on their arms and belts around their waists. All of a sudden, Yugi, Téa, and Tristan are ambushed by Gokibore and a Kamakiriman and become separated in the frenzy. After obtaining Celtic Guardian and using him to defeat Kamakiriman, Yugi realizes that somehow they have been transported into the world of Capsule Monsters.
2	"Divide and Conquer"	September 16, 2006
After landing on a mountaintop and being grabbed by a Kurama, Joey escapes a flock of Kurama chicks on Baby Dragon. While hiding in a cave he finds a treasure chest that turns out to contain a map of the capsule monster world. Meanwhile, Yugi fights off a Trent with the help of Celtic Guardian and his new monster, Hinotama Soul. Tristan and Téa manage to beat Root Water with the help of Thunder Kid and Happy Lover, only to have it evolve into High Tide Gyojin. As Téa and Tristan become overwhelmed by the monster, a mysterious stranger saves them by ordering his Summoned Skull to strike the monster down with a lightning strike.
3	"Reunited at Last"	September 23, 2006
After seeing the lightning strike, Yugi rushes to the scene. Yugi not only finds an unconscious Téa and Tristan, but also his missing grandpa, who turns out to be the stranger that saved them. They set up a campsite and exchange stories of how they arrived. Joey spots the gang while riding Baby Dragon and soon the entire group is reunited. While discussing how to escape the world, Yami Yugi explains that he believes that in order to escape they must play the game. Suddenly, the gang is surrounded by Flower Wolves. Overwhelmed by their numbers, the gang flees. While trying to find food, they hear what sounds like an earthquake only to discover that they're on an Island Turtle. They escape the Island Turtle as it sinks back into the sea and they find a temple on the lake and enter, where they find a huge lamp. La Jinn emerges and attacks, along with Neo Aqua Madoor. To make matters worse, Neo Aqua Madoor freezes Téa and Solomon. Yami Yugi tries to fight on his own so his friends won't get hurt, but when the fight becomes overwhelming, Tristan and Joey help him out. Yami Yugi realizes that La Jinn and Neo Aqua Madoor's elements will weaken each other, so they trick the monsters into destroying each other, thereby freeing Téa and Solomon. An Egyptian tablet appears and Solomon translates it. "Before the shadows blanket the land, go to the Fortress of Fear. Locate the place where the spirit sleeps, and the pathway you seek will appear." The gang figures out that they must reach a fortress before the Sun sets in order to get home, or else it will close forever.
4	"Fortress of Fear"	September 30, 2006
The gang finds a secret passageway underneath the temple and end up in a graveyard. A large group of Wandering Dooms and Wood Remains appear from the ground and begin to attack the gang. They try to fight them off but they become surrounded though and release more capsule monsters. Joey gains Flame Swordsman, Téa gains Dark Witch, and Yami Yugi gains Kuriboh. They defeat the monsters and continue to their destination. They get to the fortress but walls shoot up around it along with four statues on each corner. The gang eventually figures out that they must mimic the statues in order to get inside. As Téa, Tristan, Joey and Solomon mimic the figures, Yugi goes through the open door. Yugi finds a casket covered in hieroglyphs. Rushing forward, the floor suddenly disappears from under him, causing him to fall into a big, empty room. Outside, when the gang moves from their positions, the statues come to life and they must fight them off. The walls of the empty room start closing in on Yugi and Yami. Kuriboh's capsule begins to glow and Yami releases him. Kuriboh shows Yami a capsule he must release. Yami Yugi and Kuriboh jump up and release the capsule, which turns out to be Dark Magician. Outside the fortress, Yami uses Dark Magician to defeat the statues and save his friends; however, Grandpa's Summond Skull gets caught in the blast. The fortress walls fall and Yugi rushes to open the tomb, which he does just in time. The tomb reveals armor. Solomon then reads the next riddle. "Pass through this doorway and thy journey shall start, five trials will follow to test thy heart, but I warn you this journey is not for the weak, only a true warrior can unearth what you seek." The armor from the tomb is phased onto Yugi. Grandpa believes it is because the armor believes Yugi is a true warrior. Yugi and the gang pass through the doorway to the next challenge.
5	"Eye of the Storm"	October 7, 2006
The gang is transported to a desert where they come across a village. A little girl from the village brings them to an old man where they receive another riddle and a pentagon-shaped necklace, which Téa holds onto. The gang's first challenge is to silence the whisper that rides the desert wind. They hear a voice from outside telling them to turn back, but the gang goes out into the desert to face the voice. Medusa Worms and a sandstorm attack the group while trying to find the voice. Because of the storm the gang begins to attack each other thinking they are Medusa worms. Yami heads to the eye of the storm in order to defeat the whisper. In the storm, a masked man tells Yami Yugi to use the armor to merge with his most trusted monster; Yami chooses Dark Magician and forms dual armor. When he gets to the eye of the storm, he finds that the whisper is really Mystical Sand. Yami easily defeats the witch but becomes tired in the process. Yugi takes over and the gang discusses what transpired. A triangle on the pentagon necklace changes color to red, indicating that they completed the challenge, and a new doorway appears, leading them to the next challenge.
6	"Trial of Light and Shadow"	October 14, 2006
The group arrives on an island floating above the clouds. Yugi faints from the strain the armor put on Yami. A new message arrives and Grandpa deciphers it. "The Trial of Light and Shadows: Once a day, the unbreakable stone appears in the Valley of Light. To break fight with a force greater than physical might." Deciding to give Yugi a break from saving them, Joey, Tristan and Grandpa head out to complete the challenge alone. They find the stone, but soon have to fight Prisman to break it; Tristan sees the monster's energy blast damages the rock, so he irritates Prisman to continue attacking it. Yugi awakens, and Téa gives him the message; switching to Yami, they discover it has a second message when read in the dark. Prisman is successfully destroyed once it breaks the rock, but Skull Guardian takes its place. The Pharaoh merges with Dark Magician once more, only subduing the monster; the second half of the message said they needed to only defeat the monster, not kill it, thus proving themselves peaceful. The masked man arrives and reveals that if they fail the five trials, they will be stuck there until another challenger arrives; if Yami succeeds, he will be given the power he's worthy of.
7	"Red-Eyes Black Curse"	October 21, 2006
The group arrives in a volcanic region, where they must get rid of the Sword of Chaos; seeing a sword stuck in the mouth of a volcano, they believe the chaos they must stop is the lava. Tristan also gains Thunder Dragon along the way. Lost, Joey is attacked by Red-Eyes Black Dragon. When Joey grabs Red-Eyes, the dragon becomes a dual armor that turns him evil and makes him attack his friends; however, Joey is fighting internally for control of his body. He succeeds with Yami's help, finding that the sword they need to get rid of is not the one in the volcano, but one stuck in Red-Eyes that was making him go berserk. Once the sword is removed, the dragon becomes one of Joey's capsule monsters.
8	"Fruits of Evolution"	October 28, 2006
Arriving in a forest, the group is to find the Fruit of Evolution and offer it to a temple. A Petit Moth accidentally leads them to the temple, where three apples are but a labyrinth soon separates everyone. Téa gains Seiyaryu, while Tristan gains Shovel Crusher. Using Tristan's newest monster to bash their way through the maze, they return to find one of the apples gone and a Cocoon of Evolution in Petit Moth's place. It hatches, revealing Great Moth, but an attack only causes it to evolve into Perfectly Ultimate Great Moth. Yami realizes one of the apples is for them and bites it, turning his Dark Magician armor into Magician of Black Chaos armor. He easily slays the monster before offering the final apple to the altar.
9	"The Fiendish Five, Part 1"	November 4, 2006
The masked man reveals himself as Alexander the Great; he also explains their final test is to slay the Fiendish Five, dragons terrorizing a village. The village is protected by a mighty Dragon of Light, but its power grows weak at night. Alexander gives Grandpa a Curse of Dragon, while Yugi gains Black Luster Soldier. The Fiendish Five, consisting of Tyrant Dragon, Meteor Dragon, Serpent Night Dragon, Water Dragon, and Luster Dragon #2, are seemingly defeated; however, they return and force the group back to the village. Yami realizes that the fabled Sword of Divinity able to slay them can only be removed when they approach the village and he uses it to cut them down. However, the Fiendish Five revive once again, and combine into Five-Headed Dragon.
10	"The Fiendish Five, Part 2"	November 11, 2006
Five-Headed Dragon begins to attack the village, which Grandpa announces can only be slain by Light monsters. The heroes attack with Seiyaryu, Dark Witch, Thunder Dragon, Shovel Crush, and Happy Lover – all of which are monsters of light. However, their attacks prove useless against the Five-Headed Dragon/Fiendish Five. A villager prays to the dragon of light and it emerges from its tablet, revealing itself as Blue-Eyes White Dragon; it fuses with the Pharaoh, who uses its power and the sword's to put an end to the Fiendish Five. Alexander warns that Dr. Alex Brisbane is possessed by his dark side; he once wore a "lucky charm" – the Millennium Ring – which produced his evil side. Though he did win the Capsule Monsters game, corruption from his inner evil prevented him from opening the door. Upon being unable to open the inner chamber, Alexander lost control and killed his vassals. After he realized what had happened, the Millennium Ring split Alexander's soul in two and abandoned him, and his good half was sealed within the Capsule Monsters game while his evil half was sealed within the pyramid, as punishment. Using Grandpa as a vessel, Alexander escapes the game and fights with his evil side in Brisbane; however, his evil side proves too strong, and he tricks Grandpa into giving him the key. They all race to the room at the top of the pyramid, where a struggle ensues. They end up falling into a void, where Shadi awaits them.
11	"The True King, Part 1"	November 18, 2006
Shadi tells everyone that they must battle the evil Alex using their capsule monsters, the winners will be given the chance to obtain ultimate power. The spirits of evil Alexander's old servants return. Everyone is on a battlefield now, and they release their monsters, beginning the final battle for ultimate power. As the gang fights Alexander's servants, he watches from his giant stone monster, Reshef the Dark Being. As the rest of the gang defeat the servants' monsters, Alexander sacrifices their monsters (and his servants in the process) to summon the Seven-Armed Fiend. The Seven-Armed Fiend is then revealed to be the monster from Yugi's nightmares. Solomon remembers every arm has a different ability, making it almost indestructible. They all fight it, and, after much effort, when Alexander attempts to read Yami's mind again, Yami temporarily traps Alexander's mind within the Millennium Puzzle, confusing the creature, which allows them to destroy it. Alexander tells them they'll never win.
12	"The True King, Part 2"	November 25, 2006
"Evil" Alexander tells Yami there is no way he can win. Since his Seven-Armed Fiend was destroyed, his vassals and their monsters return to the field. Then, he orders his front line to attack. Tristan's Shovel Crusher and Téa's Dark Witch are destroyed. Then Joey attacks Reflect Bounder, but his attacks are reflected and he says "I should have seen that coming". Grandpa's Curse of Dragon and Téa's Seiyaryu distract two of Alex's followers so Yugi can attack. He attacks with "Chaos Blade" and gets a direct hit on Alexander. But then Alexander attacks with "Multi-directional laser assault". Magician of Black Chaos rescues Yugi and he exclaims "Sorry; slight miscalculation on my part". Curse of Dragon then attacks Total Defense Shogun but the attack fails. Saying a lust for power would be his downfall, Yami attacks Alexander with Celtic Guardian, Magician of Black Chaos, and Black Luster Soldier. The attack causes Reshef's lasers to turn off. Alexander sacrifices his servants' monsters, and, in turn, to release Reshef's full power, leaving his servants vulnerable to attack, which also has the side effect of inflicting pain on them each time one of Reshef's components is attacked. The gang's attacks have no effect. Yami tries to get his friends to leave, not wanting them to be hurt any further. They give a speech about how they are in this together, and will never leave their friend's side. Alexander unleashes another attack on Yami directly, and suddenly, Seiyaryu, Red-Eyes Black Dragon, Curse of Dragon, and Thunder Dragon all combine around Yugi, forming the Armor of Unity. Yami then flies at Alexander and transforms into a phoenix-like form, blasting energy through him, and destroying the evil Alexander. Alexander is finally defeated, and when Shadi presents Yami Yugi with the Ultimate Power, the Pharaoh turns down the offer. Shadi compliments him on being a "true king", and the souls of the good Alexander and his servants finally find rest in the afterlife. Afterward, the group leaves the Capsule Monsters Pyramid before it vanishes, and they all return home.
