= Yu-Gi-Oh! GX season 2 =

Yu-Gi-Oh! GX
- Season 2
- No. of episodes: 52

Release
- Original network: TV Tokyo
- Original release: October 5, 2005 – September 27, 2006

Season chronology
- ← Previous; Season 1 Next → Season 3

Yu-Gi-Oh! Duel Monsters GX (遊☆戯☆王デュエルモンスターズGX, Yū-gi-ō Dyueru Monsutāzu Jī Ekkusu) is the fourth addition to the Yu-Gi-Oh! anime meta-series, as well as the 1st main spin-off series. The plot centers around Jaden Yuki and his friends, and tells of their adventures at Duel Academy, a school that teaches students how to play the card game Duel Monsters. Season two, the Society of Light Saga, covers their second year at the Academy. This season was broadcast by 4Kids Entertainment as Yu-Gi-Oh! GX.

== Summary ==
The season begins with the dinosaur-obsessed drill sergeant Tyranno Hassleberry joining the Academy. He joins the Ra Yellow dorm and quickly becomes friends with Jaden. Also arriving with the new students is pro duelist Aster Phoenix. Aster is later revealed to be part of an organization known as the Society of Light, who are out to take over the world. The true evil behind the Society begins to show itself, brainwashing the Academy's students, including several of Jaden's friends. At the same time, the "Genex Tournament" begins in the school, with students and pros alike competing. During the tournament, Sartorius, the leader of the Society of Light, gains control of a powerful laser satellite, with the power to brainwash the entire world. Jaden and the others work together with Aster Phoenix to save the world and free Sartorius from the evil that controls him.

== Episode list ==
No. overall	No. in season	English dub title / Japanese translated title	Written by	Original release date	American air date
53	1	"Back to Duel" / "The Beginning of Destiny! A New Student, Edo Phoenix"; Transliteration: "Unmei no Hajimari! Shinnyūsei Edo Fenikkusu" (Japanese: 運命のはじまり!新入生エド·フェニックス)	Junki Takegami	October 5, 2005	August 21, 2006
It's Jaden's second year at Duel Academy and a lot has changed. Chancellor Sheppard has left, leaving Dr. Crowler and his assistant, Vice-Chancellor Bonaparte, in charge of the school. Jaden was in his dorm room, when he got challenged to a duel by a new student, known as "A.P." Jaden dueled the student, who was sent by a mysterious fortune-teller who wanted A.P. to lose in order to test Jaden's dueling skills. Jaden won and later found out from his friends that A.P. was short for Aster Phoenix, a Pro-League duelist who's better than Zane. Jaden thought he really beat a pro, until he found out from Dorothy that Aster was using a deck of cards he built from a bunch of random card packs, making Jaden even more excited to duel him again.
54	2	"Champion or Chazz-been" / "Thunder vs. Elite! Mecha Ojama King Takes Off"; Transliteration: "Sandā Vāsasu Erīto-kun! Meka Ojama Kingu Hasshin" (Japanese: サンダーVSエリート君!メカおジャマキング発進)	Yoichi Kato	October 12, 2005	August 22, 2006
Vice-Chancellor Bonaparte wants to tear down the Slifer dorm, believing that a dormitory of weak students is hurting the school's image. Crowler dismisses the idea and decides to give the school some publicity by having Chazz Princeton duel against Reginald Van Howell III, an Obelisk Blue freshman with a hatred for weak cards and weak duelists. With the condition that if he wins, Chazz gets promoted back to the Obelisk dorm. He accepts and duels Reggie, who uses a Warrior-type deck. Chazz realizes that he used to be just like Reggie, and looked down on weaker duelists. But using his Ojamas and Mecha-Ojama King, Chazz defeats Reggie. After seeing how much the Slifer students showed their appreciation and love for him, Crowler decides to let Chazz stay in the Slifer dorm. Afterwards, Chazz has a construction crew work on the dorm to fix it to his liking.
55	3	"A Hassleberry Hounding" / "Enter Tyranno Kenzan!"; Transliteration: "Tirano Kenzan Tōjō-zaurusu!" (Japanese: ティラノ剣山登場ざうるす!)	Yasuyuki Suzuki	October 19, 2005	August 23, 2006
Jaden finds out from Syrus that someone has been challenging students to Duels and stealing their Duel Disks. After learning that Syrus lost his too, Jaden decides to face this bully at a bridge in the forest. His name is Tyranno Hassleberry, a new student in Ra Yellow who duels with a Dinosaur deck. He had passed all his entrance exams, but was stuck in Ra instead of Obelisk Blue due to a lack of connections. He formed an army of his supporters and stole people's Duel Disks in order to show his power. But Jaden tries to teach Hassleberry to learn from his past and adapt rather than repeating it. Jaden beats him using a new fusion monster, Elemental Hero Wild Wingman, and Hassleberry gives the Duel Disks back to their owners. He then decides to live in the Slifer dorm because he felt he could learn a lot about dueling from Jaden.
56	4	"Sad but Truesdale" / "Sho vs. Insect Girl! Insect Princess"; Transliteration: "(Shō Vāsasu Konchū Shōjo! Insekuto Purinsesu" (Japanese: 翔VS昆虫少女! インセクト·プリンセス)	Yuki Enatsu	October 26, 2005	August 24, 2006
After hearing from Alexis that Dr. Crowler wants to turn her into a dueling pop-singer, the group realizes that Crowler is using the students for fame and makes a pact to stop him. But Bastion announces that Crowler wants Syrus to duel Missy, an Obelisk Blue with a powerful insect deck and a crush on Zane. If he wins, Syrus will get promoted to Ra Yellow. But Syrus doubts his skills and fears that he won't be as good as everyone else. With encouragement from Hassleberry, even to the point of giving Jaden his Spell Card Power Bond before starting, Syrus accepts the challenge. Even without Power Bond, Syrus overcomes Missy's Insect monsters and advances to Ra Yellow.
57	5	"The Demon" / "Kaiser vs. Ed! Pro League Battle"; Transliteration: "Kaizā Bāsasu Edo! Puro Rīgu no Tatakai" (Japanese: カイザーVSエド! プロリーグの戦い)	Shin Yoshida	November 2, 2005	August 25, 2006
The news has spread that Zane is dueling against Aster Phoenix in a Pro-League duel. As Zane prepares for the duel, he witnesses a duelist in the city get beaten by a mysterious "Demon," who disappears before saying, "You can't hide from destiny." All of Duel Academy watches on a big screen as their top graduate faces the newest dueling sensation. Aster reveals his true deck, a Hero deck, very similar to Jaden's. Everyone, including Zane, thinks he has the advantage, but Aster uses different fusion monsters than Jaden, like Phoenix Enforcer (a card similar to Jaden's Flame Wingman but with different special abilities). Despite Zane's best efforts, his Cyber End Dragon proves to be no match for Aster and his most powerful Hero, Shining Phoenix Enforcer. Upon defeat, Zane realizes that the monster that attacked earlier was Phoenix Enforcer, and deduces that Aster is the Demon. Both Zane and the school are left in shock, believing that Aster Phoenix cannot be defeated.
58	6	"A New Breed of Hero (Part 1 of 2)" / "VS Edo (Part 1 of 2) - E-Hero VS E-Hero"; Transliteration: "Vāsasu Edo (Zenpen) Ī-Hīrō tai Ī-Hīrō" (Japanese: VSエド(前編)Eヒーロー対Eヒーロー)	Shin Yoshida	November 9, 2005	August 28, 2006
After his duel with Zane, Aster told a bunch of journalists that there's a duelist he's after for copying his Hero deck. Afterwards, he meets with Sartorius, who tells him that the rivalry between Aster and Jaden was predetermined by the tarot cards (or fate). Aster travels to Duel Academy to challenge Jaden to a rematch in the duel arena. Sartorius comments that once Jaden loses, he will "see the light." Jaden and Aster use their Elemental Heroes, until Jaden finally defeats Shining Phoenix Enforcer with Shining Flare Wingman. Aster then counters by revealing his new monsters, known as the Destiny Heroes, a series of cards that haven't been publicly released. Aster explains that he uses the cards to fight for justice, and that Jaden's lack of purpose will be his undoing.
59	7	"A New Breed of Hero (Part 2 of 2)" / "VS Edo (Part 2 of 2) - Fated D-Hero; Transliteration: "Vāsasu Edo (Kōhen) Unmei no Dī-Hīrō" (Japanese: VSエド(後編)運命のDヒーロー)	Shin Yoshida	November 16, 2005	August 29, 2006
Using the Field Spell Clock Tower Prison along with the abilities of his Destiny Heroes, Aster proves that no matter what move Jaden makes, destiny itself is in control. Jaden manages to destroy the Clock Tower, but once again, Aster is prepared and summons a more powerful Hero: Dread Master. Aster revealed that his father was the one who created the Destiny Heroes, but he was taken away when Aster was younger. Since then, he made a vow to find the person responsible, and he uses his Heroes to carry out his mission. Dread Master finishes Jaden off, with Aster once again telling his opponent, "You can't hide from destiny." After Jaden loses, he starts to feel faint and his cards become blank.
60	8	"Pop Goes the Duel" / "Asuka vs. Fubuki! The Path to Sibling Idol"; Transliteration: "Asuka Vāsasu Fubuki! Kyōdai Aidoru eno Michi" (Japanese: 明日香VS吹雪!兄妹アイドルへの道)	Yuki Enatsu	November 23, 2005	August 30, 2006
Ever since losing to Aster Phoenix, Jaden feels depressed because he can no longer see his cards (still not knowing it's because of Sartorius' spells). His friends decide to stick together, knowing that Crowler will want to use Jaden's absence as an excuse to tear down the Slifer dorm. Atticus shows up to tell Alexis that Crowler wants to turn the siblings into a singing pop duo, but when she refuses, they settle it with a duel. Alexis beats her brother's Warrior deck and Jaden decides to quit Duel Academy.
61	9	"I've Seen the Light" / "Saiou Enters! The Tarot Deck of Destiny"; Transliteration: "Saiō Tōjō! Unmei no Tarotto Dekki" (Japanese: 斎王登場! 運命のタロットデッキ)	Yasuyuki Suzuki	November 30, 2005	August 31, 2006
Chazz tried challenging Jaden to a duel to get his spirits up, but he wasn't in the mood. Meanwhile, Sartorius' plans had not gone as he expected. Because he put his power into Aster's cards so when Jaden lost, his soul should have been wiped clean and he would have become Sartorius's servant, but he just lost the ability to see cards. Sartorius predicts there is someone else who could be of use to him, and he travels to Duel Academy. He tells Crowler and Bonaparte that as Aster's manager, he was looking for someone else as a client. After Syrus alerts everyone that Jaden has disappeared, his friends go looking for him and Chazz runs into Sartorius in the forest. Chazz takes this opportunity to showcase his skills, but Sartorius' mind games start taking their toll on him. Chazz ultimately loses, and Sartorius locks his soul into The Hangman tarot card before leaving the island. Jaden also leaves the island by boat and decided he wasn't going to return until he found his destiny. In the morning, Chazz is seen walking around the dorm, dressed in white, saying he has "seen the light."
62	10	"A Greater Porpoise" / "New Elemental Hero! Neos"; Transliteration: "Shin Erementaru Hīrō! Neosu" (Japanese: 新Eヒーロー! ネオス)	Junki Takegami	December 7, 2005	September 1, 2006
While Jaden is out at sea, his boat is struck by a shooting star. He wakes up in a strange world. One of the inhabitants, a dolphin named Aquos, tells Jaden that he has to save the universe. A group known as the Society of Light is ruining the balance of dimensions by destroying the darkness. Jaden is confronted by a strange alien-like robot that challenges him to a duel, even though he doesn't have his deck. Aquos shows Jaden a satellite sent by KaibaCorp into space. In it was a deck of cards that Jaden created as part of a drawing contest that Kaiba sponsored. Jaden defeats the alien, and his love of dueling is rejuvenated. He is sent back to Academy Island, along with his new deck, which is now infused with the power of Neo-Space.
63	11	"Curry Worries" / "Kenzan vs. Demon of the Curry! Spicy Duel"; Transliteration: "Kenzan Vāsasu Karē no Majin! Supaishī Dyueru" (Japanese: 剣山VSカレーの魔人! スパイシーデュエル)	Yoichi Kato	December 14, 2005	September 5, 2006
With Professor Banner gone, the quality of the food in the Slifer dorm had gone down. A mysterious chef comes to the dorm and offers to cook if Hassleberry could beat him in a duel. If he lost, the Ra students at Slifer Dorm would come back to Ra. The chef uses his food-monster cards and eventually reveals himself to be Professor Sartyr, the headmaster of the Ra dorm. He challenged Hassleberry because Ra dorm had been empty lately with the students either being promoted to Obelisk Blue or hanging out at the Slifer Dorm. Hassleberry defeats him, proving that he can get stronger even at Slifer, and that he shouldn't force people to leave a place they feel they belong. He cooks his delicious food for the students, and they agree to visit regularly.
64	12	"Camaraderie Contest" / "Sho vs. Kenzan! A Duel with Passionate Thoughts Toward Big Brother"; Transliteration: "Shō Vāsasu Kenzan! Aniki eno Atsuki Omoi Dyueru" (Japanese: 翔VS剣山! 兄貴への熱き想いデュエル)	Yuki Enatsu	December 21, 2005	September 6, 2006
After fighting each other for so long, Syrus and Hassleberry decide to settle their argument with a duel. The winner would earn the title of Jaden's best friend and the loser would be the other's subordinate. Hassleberry gains the upper hand thanks to his dinosaurs' special abilities, but Syrus reveals his Cyber Summon Blaster and uses the abilities of his Vehicroid monsters to trap Hassleberry into a nonstop loop. Hassleberry attempts to regain control by playing his face down, but after learning of Syrus' dedication to finding Jaden and how it's affected him, Hassleberry realizes that Syrus truly deserves to be Jaden's best friend. He stands down, causing him to lose the rest of his Life Points, and Syrus wins.
65	13	"No Pain, No Game" / "Hell Kaiser Ryo! Chimeratech Overdragon"; Transliteration: "Heru Kaizā Ryō! Kimeratekku Ōbā Doragon" (Japanese: ヘルカイザー亮!キメラテック·オーバー·ドラゴン)	Yasuyuki Suzuki	December 28, 2005	September 7, 2006
Ever since Zane lost his duel to Aster, his pro career has gone downhill. After losing another simple duel and being dropped by his sponsorship, he is confronted by a businessman named Mr. Shroud. He introduces the concept of underground dueling to get his career back. Zane is led to a cage match in a restaurant and is forced to duel Mad Dog, a champion underground duelist who uses Slime monsters. In the duel, every Life Point lost results in an electric shock. Mad Dog constantly mocks Zane and uses his Slime cards to destroy his machines and reduce his Life Points. Realizing that he has nothing left to lose, and that he's spent too much time respecting his opponents, Zane becomes more malicious, and defeats Mad Dog using his newest Fusion monster: Chimeratech Overdragon. After the duel, Zane starts to build his career back up, beating his opponents without mercy or respect.
66	14	"Going Bananas" / "Judai's New Year Dream Duel!"; Transliteration: "Jūdai Hatsuyume Dyueru" (Japanese: 十代初夢デュエル!)	Junki Takegami	January 4, 2006	September 8, 2006
While still looking for the school, Jaden runs into Wheeler, the dueling monkey he saved in episode #13. After fainting from hunger, he starts to hallucinate his friends were there to help him. Jaden has flashbacks of his past duels with Chazz, Bastion, Crowler and Zane. After Wheeler got him some bananas to eat, Jaden got back up and started to continue to look for the school, not knowing that he just missed the sign that says where it is. This is a clip show.
67	15	"Homecoming Duel (Part 1 of 2)" / "VS Edo (Part 1 of 2) - New Power! Aqua Neos"; Transliteration: "Vāsasu Edo (Zenpen) Aratana Chikara! Akua Neosu" (Japanese: VSエド(前編)新たな力! アクア·ネオス)	Shin Yoshida	January 11, 2006	October 2, 2006
Still looking for Duel Academy, Jaden sees a meteor land near the forest. When he gets near it, he is confronted by other Neo-Spacians like Aquos, who wanted to lend their power to his deck. Meanwhile, Bonaparte decides to have a duel between Aster and Alexis for the fate of the Slifer dorm. Aster didn't want to duel at first, but Sartorius said he should because his tarot cards predicted danger ahead. After meeting up at the duel arena, Jaden finally returns and offers to take Alexis' place in the duel, hoping to avenge his loss to Aster and showcase the power of his Neo-Spacians. Aster is able to summon his Dread Master, but Jaden uses Neo-Spacian Aqua Dolphin and Elemental Hero Neos. The two fuse together through Contact Fusion to form Elemental Hero Aqua Neos, who destroys Dread Master but then returns to Jaden's hand at the end of the turn. With Jaden left wide open, Aster uses his Destiny Heroes for a triple attack on his Life Points.
68	16	"Homecoming Duel (Part 2 of 2)" / "VS Edo (Part 2 of 2) - Flaming Flare Neos"; Transliteration: "Vāsasu Edo (Kōhen) Honō no Furea Neosu" (Japanese: VSエド(後編)炎のフレア·ネオス)	Shin Yoshida	January 18, 2006	October 3, 2006
As the duel continues, Jaden tries to show Aster that his Heroes should be used to spread good, and that his father would want him to as well. Aster summons his strongest Destiny Hero—Dogma. Jaden fights back using his Neo-Spacian Flare Scarab. Using Contact Fusion, Neos fuses with Flare Scarab to create Elemental Hero Flare Neos. Flare Neos manages to defeat Dogma and Jaden wins the duel, proving to Aster that Jaden was stronger than destiny. Aster decides to enroll into Duel Academy and believes that Sartorius is hiding things from him, like what he wants with Jaden and about the Society of Light.
69	17	"Dormitory Demolition" / "Cronos vs. Napoleon! March of Toy Soldiers"; Transliteration: "Kuronosu Vāsasu Naporeon! Toi Sorujā no Kōshin" (Japanese: クロノスVSナポレオン! トイソルジャーの行進)	Natsuko Takahashi	January 25, 2006	October 4, 2006
Chancellor Crowler and Vice Chancellor Bonaparte argue about the demolition of the Slifer red dorm. They agree to duel for the outcome of the dorm. If Crowler wins then the dorm stays, though if Bonaparte wins then the dorm gets demolished. Bonaparte's Toy Soldiers put Crowler into a tight spot, especially with Bonaparte's Unequal Treaty card. Crowler manages to free his Ancient Gear Golem from Bonaparte's trap, thanks to Ancient Gear Engineer, and it wipes out Bonaparte's remaining Life Points. Thus, the red dorm is saved and that deep down, Crowler does care a little.
70	18	"Obelisk White?" / "Asuka vs. Manjoume - White Thunder!"; Transliteration: "Asuka Vāsasu Manjōme Howaito Sandā!" (Japanese: 明日香VS万丈目 ホワイトサンダー!)	Junki Takegami	February 1, 2006	October 5, 2006
Chazz duels the students of the Obelisk dorm and by beating them, he turns them into members of the Society of Light and even paints the dorm white to represent the Society. Alexis decides to end this madness by dueling Chazz, who claims to have the ability to see the future. He even uses a magic card that allows Alexis to see all of the cards in his hand. Alexis thinks she has the advantage, but in reality, Chazz's "playing chess not checkers" approach is throwing her off. After equipping his Armed Dragon LV10 with the Spell Card White Veil, Chazz wins the duel and Alexis becomes a member of the Society.
71	19	"DuelFellas" / "VS Game Champ! Giant Battleship Tetran Takes Off"; Transliteration: "Vāsasu Geimu Chanpu! Kyodai Senkan Tetoran Hashin" (Japanese: VSゲームチャンプ! 巨大戦艦テトラン発進)	Yuki Enatsu	February 8, 2006	October 6, 2006
Chazz and tries to convince Bonaparte to allow the White Dorm to stay. To ensure the red dorm goes away and that Jaden "sees the light," Chazz and Alexis hire Lorenzo—an arcade game champion who duels with B.E.S. Monsters. Jaden and Lorenzo duel in the school planetarium, and at first, Lorenzo's combination of Boss Rush, Cyber Summon Blaster, and his army of battleships starts to wear Jaden down. But thanks to his newest Neo-Spacian, Grand Mole, Jaden puts an end to Lorenzo's strategy and uses Neos to win the duel.
72	20	"Not Playing with a Full Deck" / "Destroy Deck Destruction"; Transliteration: "Dekki Hakai wo Hakaiseyo" (Japanese: デッキ破壊を破壊せよ)	Yoichi Kato	February 15, 2006	October 10, 2006
Chazz hires another duelist to get rid of Jaden—X, Sartorius' lawyer. X lures Jaden into a cave for the duel and Aster explains that X has never lost a duel. He's known to beat his opponents by destroying their decks rather than their Life Points. X keeps using magic and trap cards to deplete a good portion of Jaden's deck, but then, with the help of Neo-Spacian Glow Moss, Jaden makes a comeback and forces X to lose by "deck out" before he can.
73	21	"Source of Strength" / "Kenzan vs. Saiou! Dinosaur DNA"; Transliteration: "Kenzan Vāsasu Saiō! Kyōryū Dī-Enu-Ē da-don" (Japanese: 剣山VS斎王!恐竜DNAだドン)	Junki Takegami	February 22, 2006	October 11, 2006
Sartorius predicts that Jaden and Aster have joined forces, but there is another that can't be swayed and could ruin Sartorius' plans. He travels to Duel Academy to meet this threat: Hassleberry. Hassleberry and Sartorius duel each other, despite the worries from Jaden and Syrus. Sartorius uses the same strategy as he did Chazz, with cards whose abilities are determined by Hassleberry's decisions. Sartorius wins, but much to his and everyone else's surprise, Hassleberry isn't affected by his power to turn into a Society member. Hassleberry reveals that he had a serious leg injury when he was a kid. When in surgery, his tibia was replaced by a dinosaur bone, giving him "dino DNA." The next day, Crowler announces that Sartorius has enrolled at Duel Academy as a new student.
74	22	"Happily Never After" / "Revival Frog! Living Frog! Death Frog!"; Transliteration: "Yomi Gaeru! Iki Gaeru! Desu Gaeru!" (Japanese: 黄泉ガエル!イキカエル!デスガエル!)	Yasuyuki Suzuki	March 1, 2006	October 12, 2006
Sartorius enrolls into the Academy so that he could continue his plans at a more "convenient" location. When the time comes for the Chancellors to select where they'll go for the school field trip, Sartorius and the Society of Light want to choose, but Jaden cuts in. They agree to decide the issue with a duel—Jaden against the Society's own, Princess Rose. Rose is an Obelisk Blue who claims to see duel spirits, just like Chazz and Jaden. She uses a deck filled with Frog monsters, though Rose believes they're all actually princes. Jaden is able to win and decides that the school field trip will be to Domino City, Yugi's hometown. Sartorius says that the duel with Rose was a test to see if Jaden could really see duel spirits and that the Domino City trip will help with his next plan.
75	23	"Taken by Storm (Part 1 of 2)" / "Field Trip Tag Duel"; Transliteration: "Shūgakuryokō Taggu Dyueru" (Japanese: 修学旅行タッグデュエル)	Shin Yoshida	March 8, 2006	October 13, 2006
During the school field trip to Domino City, the Society of Light follows their own objectives, while Jaden and his friends explored the city. Meanwhile, Aster believed that Sartorius has targeted some of the strongest duelists to join the Society of Light. Jaden and his friends meet Solomon Motou, Yugi's grandfather, who shows the group more of the city. In a cave outside the city, a mysterious witch sends two masked ninjas to take care of Jaden. They kidnap Mr. Motou and the witch uses a spell to surround the city with a force field made up of giant duel spirits. Syrus and Hassleberry are confronted by the two ninjas who said they'll have to beat them to see Mr. Motou again. They duel on top of a building (the building where Kaiba and Yugi dueled Lumis and Umbra for the second time). The ninjas, Frost and Thunder, dueled two on two and easily gain the advantage, even though they didn't seem to get along.
76	24	"Taken by Storm (Part 2 of 2)" / "Ultimate Alliance! Rex Union"; Transliteration: "Kyūkyoku Gattai! Rekusu Yunion" (Japanese: 究極合体!レックスユニオン)	Shin Yoshida	March 15, 2006	October 16, 2006
Chazz travels to a cave outside of the city and to meet with the mysterious witch—Sarina, Sartorius' sister. He was sent to get her while Sartorius met with Seto Kaiba at Kaiba Corp. He asked for permission to use his amusement park, Kaiba Land, for just one day. Kaiba allowed it, but told his guards to keep an eye on Sartorius for safety measures. Meanwhile, Jaden found Mr. Motou in an alleyway and Aster, who came to help, said that he could see the giant duel spirits around the city. As for Hasslebery and Syrus, they took advantage of Frost and Thunder's lousy teamwork and combined their strongest monsters together to gain the upper hand, but Frost used a trap card that countered their attack and took out their life points as well as Thunder's. Afterwards, Frost met up with Jaden and Aster and gave them a clue to the whereabouts of their friends: look for a higher altitude.
77	25	"J-Dawg and T-Bone" / "The Four Monarchs of Terror! Demiourgos EMA"; Transliteration: "Kyōfu no Yontei! Demiurugosu Ema" (Japanese: 恐怖の四帝! デミウルゴス·EMA)	Yuki Enatsu	March 22, 2006	October 17, 2006
Sarina punishes Frost and Thunder for not taking Jaden by sealing their souls in cards using a mirror. She then summons two more members of her Light Brigade, Blaze and T-Bone, and sent them to take care of Jaden. While Jaden and the rest of the Slifer Reds camped outside, Mr. Motou came back to serve some sandwiches. Blaze and T-Bone joined the group for some food and then challenged Jaden after finding out who he was. Sarina sealed Blaze's soul in a card for T-Bone to use and the two squared off. T-Bone used his earth deck, but then combined the powers of the other Light Brigade decks in order to gain the advantage. Jaden won using Neos and Sarina sealed T-Bone away and then said Jaden will have to save his friends, Syrus and Hassleberry, at the virtual dome in Kaiba Land.
78	26	"Mirror, Mirror (Part 1 of 2)" / "The Strongest Tag!? Judai & Edo (Part 1 of 2)"; Transliteration: "Saikyō Taggu!? Jūdai Ando Edo (Zenpen)" (Japanese: 最強タッグ!? 十代&エド(前編))	Junki Takegami	March 29, 2006	October 28, 2006
Jaden and Aster made their way to the virtual world in Kaiba Land. The building was set up like a virtual land and Hassleberry and Syrus were seen in the form of a virtual dinosaur and toy car. Sarina appeared and challenged Jaden and Aster to a duel. The purpose was because Sartorius wanted to see which one of the two was worthy enough to be by his side. Sarina created a mirror clone of herself to make it a tag duel and as they started, it was obvious that Jaden and Aster were equal in strength. Aster refused to help because he wanted to be the one worthy, but then Sarina played a magic card, Full Moon Mirror, and after 10 monsters were destroyed, its true power was about to be revealed.
79	27	"Mirror, Mirror (Part 2 of 2)" / "The Strongest Tag!? Judai & Edo (Part 2 of 2)"; Transliteration: "Saikyō Taggu!? Jūdai Ando Edo (Kōhen)" (Japanese: 最強タッグ!? 十代&エド(後編))	Junki Takegami	April 5, 2006	November 4, 2006
Sarina used Full Moon Mirror to summon her most powerful monster, Dark Creator. She created multiple clones of the same monster and started tearing Jaden and Aster apart. The two decided to throw their differences aside and Jaden used the abilities of the Destiny Heroes to summon a new Neo-Spacian, Dark Panther. Using Contact Fusion, Jaden fused him with Neos to summon Dark Neos. His power to copy a monster and their abilities allowed them to destroy the army of clones and win the duel. Afterwards, Sarina explained that Sartorius is not all evil. She told the story that Sartorius was a fortuneteller who received a card from a mysterious stranger. Ever since he got the card, he's been possessed by another force. As the virtual world collapsed, Sarina stayed behind so that she could watch her brother from the land of virtual reality. After escaping, Jaden and his friends returned to the group and set off for Duel Academy.
80	28	"What a Doll!" / "Alice in Despairland"; Transliteration: "Zetsubō no Kuni no Arisu" (Japanese: 絶望の国のアリス)	Natsuko Takahashi	April 12, 2006	November 11, 2006
After returning to the Duel Academy, Jaden and his friends are met by a new girl, Alice, living in the Slifer Dorm. She cooks and cleans for the boys and Hassleberry starts to fall in love with her. That night, Hassleberry went missing and Jaden found him near the river with Alice standing by him. Alice was really the spirit of a doll who watched duelists mistreat their cards and show no respect for duel spirits. Jaden dueled against Alice and her deck full of doll monsters. Although Alice had the advantage, Jaden won using Level 10 Winged Kuriboh. Afterwards, Alice's soul returned to its original doll form and was returned to its holding case.
81	29	"Let's Make a Duel!" / "Quiz Duel!? VS Nazora Panel 9"; Transliteration: "Kuizu Dyueru!? Nazorā Paneru Nain" (Japanese: クイズデュエル!? VSナゾラー·パネル9)	Junki Takegami, Yoichi Kato	April 19, 2006	November 18, 2006
When Jaden gives dating advice to an Obelisk student on the internet, the student, Bob Banter, takes his advice seriously and tries to get Alexis to fall in love with him. When Jaden catches Bob spying on Alexis, she accuses him of being the spy and threatens to have him expelled, unless he can defeat Bob in a duel. Jaden accepts knowing he could become a member of the Society of Light if he loses. Bob uses a special deck that turns the theme of the duel into a game show. Jaden loses a lot of his monsters when answering the questions wrong, but he turns things around and wins the duel using his Flame Wingman. Afterwards, Bob continues to harass Jaden, hoping to get more dating advice from him.
82	30	"Magnetic Personality" / "Misawa vs. Manjoume - Assault Cannon Beetle"; Transliteration: "Misawa Vāsasu Manjōme Asaruto Kyanon Bītoru" (Japanese: 三沢VS万丈目 アサルト·キャノン·ビートル)	Shin Yoshida	April 26, 2006	December 2, 2006
Bastion realizes that all of the Ra Yellow students have been taken over by the Society of Light. After a long time of coming up with the perfect deck, Bastion challenges Sartorius to a duel. He feels that he hasn't been challenged by the Society because they don't find him worthy. Chazz agrees to duel him instead and Bastion duels with his new army of Plasma Warriors. Chazz duels with his new deck of Union monsters and the Ojama Brothers. Although Bastion would have won, he lets himself lose in the end so that he could become a Society member and feel worthy. Afterwards, Alexis convinced Chazz to throw away his "worthless" 0ATK Ojama cards.
83	31	"Schooling the Master" / "Hell Kaiser Ryo vs. Master Samejima"; Transliteration: "Heru Kaizā Ryō Vāsasu Masutā Samejima" (Japanese: ヘルカイザー亮VSマスター鮫島)	Yasuyuki Suzuki	May 3, 2006	December 9, 2006
After firing Mr. Shroud as his manager, Zane was given an invitation to meet an old friend "at the top of the world." Zane traveled to a dojo high in the snowy mountains and met with Chancellor Sheppard. It was revealed Sheppard taught Zane how to duel at that dojo and taught him to respect his opponents. It was there Zane received the Cyber End Dragon as a symbol of completion of his training and now Sheppard wanted to duel him to teach Zane to go back to his old ways. Zane dueled against his former teacher and defeated him by showing no care for his Cyber End Dragon and only focusing on defeating his opponent. After winning, he stole the dojo's secret deck, the Underworld deck. Before leaving Sheppard told him about a dueling tournament he was hosting at Duel Academy. He believed that Zane's friends could win back the old Zane they know and love.
84	32	"Generation Next" / "Genex Opens! Aim to be Number One!"; Transliteration: "Jenekusu Kaimaku! Mezase Ichiban!" (Japanese: ジェネックス開幕! 目指せー番!)	Junki Takegami	May 10, 2006	December 16, 2006
Sheppard returns to Duel Academy to announce the start of the GX Tournament, in which both students and Pro Duelists will duel to be number one. Each student receives a medal and the winner will have the most medals of them all. As all of the students started dueling each other to be the best, Sartorius made arrangements to duel a Pro-League duelist, Prince Ojin. He lured Ojin to the tournament by saying he had the Destiny Hero cards and when the prince showed up, the two dueled each other. However Sartorius defeated him in 0 turns and won control of a satellite Ojin had ownership of.
85	33	"Rah, Rah, Ra!" / "The Man who Controls the God Card Winged God-Dragon of Ra"; Transliteration: "Kami no Kādo Rā no Yokushinryū wo Ayatsuru Otoko!?" (Japanese: 神のカード「ラーの翼神竜」を操る男!?)	Yuki Enatsu	May 17, 2006	December 23, 2006
Chumley returns to Duel Academy, along with his boss, Maximillion Pegasus. Pegasus' chief card designer has stolen the Winged Dragon of Ra card and was using it in the Gx tournament. Chumley gives Jaden a new card to help him duel, and he challenges the designer, Frantz, to a duel. Frantz was doing this because he was sick of Chumley getting all the respect for his cards and controlled Ra using a magic card to bound the dragon in chains. But Jaden defeats him using his new field spell, Skysraper 2 - Hero City. In the end, Pegasus forgives Frantz and allows him back.
86	34	"The Art of the Duel" / "The Duel's Stage Passageway"; Transliteration: "Dyueru no Hanamichi" (Japanese: デュエルの花道)	Natsuko Takahashi	May 24, 2006	January 6, 2007
Jaden still hasn't found an opponent to challenge for the GX Tournament, until he's challenged by a Pro-League duelist named Orlando. Orlando is a Broadway actor who uses a deck of Monsters and Spells that are themed around theatre. While Jaden tells Orlando he duels to have fun, Orlando states that he duels mainly to entertain his audiences. With the constant changing of his Kabuki Stage Field Spells and monsters' unique abilities, Jaden calls on his main hero, Neos, to put on a grand finale and win the duel.
87	35	"Blinded by the Light (Part 1 of 2)" / "Do Your Best! Ojama Trio (Part 1 of 2)"; Transliteration: "Ganbare! Ojama Torio (Zenpen)" (Japanese: がんばれ! おジャマトリオ(前編))	Shin Yoshida	May 31, 2006	January 13, 2007
After finding Chazz defeating a Pro-League duelist with a new deck given to him by Sartorius, Jaden searches for the Ojama cards to help bring the old Chazz back. With the help of the spirit of Professor Banner, Jaden found the cards in time and dueled against Chazz. Chazz used his army of White Knight monsters, but Jaden was able to hold his own with the Ojama Brothers. Using the cards started to make Chazz realize what Sartorius has done to him and but he shakes it off to try and defeat Jaden.
88	36	"Blinded by the Light (Part 2 of 2)" / "Do Your Best! Ojama Trio (Part 2 of 2)"; Transliteration: "Ganbare! Ojama Torio (Kōhen)" (Japanese: がんばれ! おジャマトリオ(後編))	Shin Yoshida	June 7, 2006	January 20, 2007
By continuing to use the Ojama Brothers, Jaden is able to finally make Chazz come to his senses. The only problem is he can't remember anything between the present and when he was brainwashed by Sartorius. The two agree to finish the duel and Chazz gives up the duel to destroy White Knight Lord. Afterwards, Chazz vows to help free Alexis from the Society the same way Jaden saved him.
89	37	"The Darkness Within" / "Hell Kaiser vs. Darkness Fubuki"; Transliteration: "Heru Kaizā Vāsasu Dākunesu Fubuki" (Japanese: ヘルカイザーVSダークネス吹雪)	Yasuyuki Suzuki	June 14, 2006	January 31, 2007
Chancellor Sheppard believes that Zane is under the control of darkness, and asks Atticus to help free him. After agreeing to it, Atticus challenges Zane to a duel, but taps into the Dragon deck and powers he once had as Nightshroud, planning to match Zane's darkness with his own. In doing so, he reawakens Nightshroud. Zane unleashes his new Cyber Dark deck and defeats Nightshroud, breaking his hold on Atticus in the process. Zane reveals he isn't being controlled despite what everyone thinks; he simply gained a new philosophy not to show mercy. Syrus makes a vow to defeat his brother and make him come to his senses.
90	38	"Pro-Dueling" / "Academia's Pride"; Transliteration: "Akademia no Puraido" (Japanese: アカデミアのプライド)	Junki Takegami	June 21, 2006	February 1, 2007
After Sheppard sees the list of students left in the tournament, mainly Jaden, Syrus, Hassleberry, Chazz, Alexis, and Bastion, he sends Crowler and Bonaparte to find more duelists for the academy. They send out Damon, back to his "primitive" ways and Belowski to defeat pro-duelists, and are successful. Meanwhile, Jasmine and Mindy have trouble against the Maitre-D, a pro-duelist, until Alexis steps in. At the end, Chazz points out that Alexis didn't use White Veil, hinting that she's regaining control.
91	39	"Don't Fear the Reaper" / "The Reaper of One Turn Kill"; Transliteration: "Wan Tān Kiru no Shinigami" (Japanese: ワンターンキルの死神)	Masahiro Hikokubo	June 28, 2006	February 5, 2007
Jaden and the gang meet a student from North Academy named Lucien Grimley, who has joined forces with the Grim Reaper. Lucien used to have bad luck with drawing the right card, but in exchange for his soul, the Reaper now allows him to draw any card he wants and ensure his victory in one round. Jaden must try to break Lucien free from his pact and restore his faith in himself.
92	40	"Duel For Hire" / "Triangle Duel"; Transliteration: "Toraianguru Dyueru" (Japanese: トライアングル·デュエル)	Yuki Enatsu	July 5, 2006	February 6, 2007
While Dr. Crowler and Vice Chancellor Bonaparte get yelled at by Chancellor Sheppard, they take it the wrong way and believe that they got fired. This happens just as Pegasus shows up for a meeting with Chancellor Sheppard. Crowler and Bonaparte beg Pegasus to hire them and a duel ensues to determine whether or not they will get the job. But Pegasus decides to cause friction between the two while using his famous Toon cards to wreak mayhem on their life points.
93	41	"Heart of Ice (Part 1 of 2)" / "The White Night Duel! Judai vs. Asuka (Part 1 of 2)"; Transliteration: "Byakuya no Kettō! Jūdai Vāsasu Asuka (Zenpen)" (Japanese: 白夜の決闘!十代VS明日香(前編))	Natsuko Takahashi	July 12, 2006	February 7, 2007
Sartorius' good side appears to both Jaden and Aster, giving them each a key to the satellite and trying to ensure the safety of the universe. In response, Sartorius' evil side enlists Alexis and her new Ice deck to win the key back from Jaden. Chazz and Atticus both urge Jaden to duel Alexis, hoping that he can bring her back to her old self. But that may be easier said than done, thanks to Alexis' White Night Queen and other ice creatures freezing most of Jaden's cards.
94	42	"Heart of Ice (Part 2 of 2)" / "White Night's Dragon! Judai vs. Asuka (Part 2 of 2)"; Transliteration: "Howaito Naitsu Doragon! Jūdai Vāsasu Asuka (Kōhen)" (Japanese: 白夜龍!十代VS明日香(後編))	Natsuko Takahashi	July 19, 2006	February 8, 2007
With Alexis' Ice cards causing some serious damage, Jaden has to find a way to destroy them and get through to her. It doesn't get any easier when she finally summons her White Night Dragon, as well as equipping it with the Society of Light's signature card—White Veil. But with him standing on thin ice, Jaden uses the power of his Armor Breaker to destroy White Veil. And with his Elemental Hero Flare Neos, Jaden defeats Alexis.
95	43	"Tough Love" / "The Codeless Duel Between Brothers - Ryo vs. Sho"; Transliteration: "Jinginaki Kyōdai Dyueru Ryō Bāsasu Shō" (Japanese: 仁義なき兄弟デュエル 亮VS翔)	Yasuyuki Suzuki	July 26, 2006	February 9, 2007
Syrus finds his brother and Aster just about to duel, but he steps in and decides to duel against Zane in order to help him come to his senses. Zane wants it his way so he uses the shock collars. In the end, despite Syrus' best efforts, Zane's Underworld Deck proves to be too much for him, and Syrus loses.
96	44	"It's All Relative" / "The Field of Relativity! Judai vs. The Genius Doctor"; Transliteration: "Sōtaisei Fīrudo! Jūdai Bāsasu Tensai Hakase" (Japanese: 相対性フィールド!十代VS天才博士)	Junki Takegami	August 2, 2006	February 12, 2007
Sartorius and Prince Ojin hire the dueling physicist Dr. Eisenstein (EYE-zuhn-steen) to challenge Jaden. With his Relativity deck, Eisenstein hopes to prove to Jaden (as well as a self-doubting Bastion) that science trumps having luck or faith in your cards.
97	45	"The Dark Light" / "Enters! The Mysterious World Champ!"; Transliteration: "Tōjō! Nazo no Sekai Chanpu!" (Japanese: 登場!謎の世界チャンプ!)	Shin Yoshida	August 9, 2006	February 13, 2007
Chancellor Shepard visits Maximillion Pegasus at Industrial Illusions, as they discuss an entity known as The Light of Destruction, as well as what Pegasus believes to be the Ultimate Destiny card. Meanwhile, Aster's legal guardian—Duelist League World Champion Kyle Jables, alias The D—makes his appearance in a nationally televised duel against Dr. Collector and his Spellcaster deck. But when The D unleashes his "secret weapon," the broadcast is cut, the Kaiba Dome is left in destruction, and everyone (including Aster) is left in a state of confusion and panic. After The D invites him to meet him on his boat, the truth is finally revealed about Aster's father.
98	46	"Ultimate Destiny" / "Finally Activated! The Ultimate D-Card"; Transliteration: "Tsuini Hatsudō! Kyūkyoku no Dī no Kādo" (Japanese: ついに発動!究極のDのカード)	Shin Yoshida	August 16, 2006	February 14, 2007
The D, who is possessed by the Light of Destruction, reveals himself to be the culprit behind the disappearance of Aster's father. And when he challenges Aster to a duel, he summons the Ultimate Destiny Hero: Destiny Hero - Plasma. With Plasma's abilities and the Spell Card D Force limiting his options, Aster uses the power of his Destiny Hero - Dark Angel to regain control of the duel and defeat the D. In addition to stealing opponents' monsters, half their points, and their abilities, Aster finds out that Plasma can also steal human souls, including his father, who tells him that Sartorius has been the main host containing the Light of Destruction. With the D defeated and the Ultimate Destiny card found, Aster heads back to the island to finally take on Sartorius.
99	47	"The Key Factor" / "Judai vs. The Terror of the Laser Satellite"; Transliteration: "Jūdai Vāsasu Rēzā Eisei no Kyōfu" (Japanese: 十代VSレーザー衛星の恐怖)	Natsuko Takahashi	August 23, 2006	February 15, 2007
Through Prince Ojin's assistant Linda, Jaden learns about Sartorius' plan to use Ojin's satellite to unleash the Light of Destruction on the planet. He decides to duel Ojin (who is possessed by Sartorius) in an attempt to return him to normal. With time of the essence, Jaden has to defend himself against the Prince and his deadly Satellite Cannons.
100	48	"The Phoenix Has Landed (Part 1 of 2)" / "Ultimate Arcana "The World""; Transliteration: "Kyūkyoku no Arukana Za Wārudo" (Japanese: 究極のアルカナ「ザ·ワールド」)	Yasuyuki Suzuki	August 30, 2006	February 16, 2007
For the sake of his lifelong friend and the fate of the universe at stake, Aster duels Sartorius in the White Dorm. But Sartorius' Arcana Force deck is proving to give Aster a run for his money. With "destiny" in control of the duel and after an attack from Arcana Force XXI - The World, Aster's life points are heavily depleted. The hopes of saving Sartorius' good side are now looking bleak.
101	49	"The Phoenix Has Landed (Part 2 of 2)" / "Ed, The Finishing Blow! "Bloo-D""; Transliteration: "Edo, Hissatsu no Ichigeki! "Burū-Dī"" (Japanese: エド, 必殺の一撃!「ブルーD」)	Yasuyuki Suzuki	September 6, 2006	February 20, 2007
With Sartorius' Arcana Force monsters overwhelming Aster, the spirit of Sartorius' good half steps in to lend a helping hand. With a newfound hope, Aster is able to summon Destiny Hero - Plasma and back Sartorius into a corner. But in the end, Aster is unable to stop the power of Arcana Force EX - The Light Ruler, and loses.
102	50	"The Hands of Justice (Part 1 of 2)" / "The Wave of Light vs. The Neo-Spacians"; Transliteration: "Hikari no Hadō Vāsasu Neo Supēshian" (Japanese: 光の波動VSネオ·スペーシアン)	Junki Takegami	September 13, 2006	February 21, 2007
With Aster failing to win, Jaden finally duels Sartorius, using the Neo-Spacians against the Arcana Force Monsters.
103	51	"The Hands of Justice (Part 2 of 2)" / "Judai's Pinch! Field Magic "Light Barrier""; Transliteration: "Jūdai Pinchi! Fīrudo Mahō Hikari no Kekkai" (Japanese: 十代ピンチ!フィールド魔法「光の結界」)	Junki Takegami	September 20, 2006	February 22, 2007
Trapped in Sartorius' Light Barrier, Jaden finds himself in a tough situation. Meanwhile, Blair returns to Duel Academy and duels Chazz.
104	52	"Future Changes" / "The Whereabouts of Victory?! Judai vs. Saiou"; Transliteration: "Shōri no Yukue wa?! Jūdai Vāsasu Saiō" (Japanese: 勝利の行方は?!十代VS斎王)	Junki Takegami	September 27, 2006	February 23, 2007
When Sartorius summons Arcana Force EX - The Light Ruler, Jaden's victory and the fate of the world comes down to Elemental Hero Neos. Meanwhile, Chazz and Blair continue their duel to decide the champion of the GX Tournament.
