= Yu-Gi-Oh! GX season 1 =

Yu-Gi-Oh! GX Yu-Gi-Oh! GX: Rise of the Sacred Beasts
- Season 1
- No. of episodes: 52

Release
- Original network: TV Tokyo
- Original release: October 6, 2004 – September 28, 2005

Season chronology
- ← Previous; Yu-Gi-Oh! Duel Monsters; Season 5 Next → Season 2

Yu-Gi-Oh! Duel Monsters GX (遊☆戯☆王デュエルモンスターズGX, Yū-gi-ō Dyueru Monsutāzu Jī Ekkusu) is the fourth addition to the Yu-Gi-Oh! anime meta-series, as well as the first main spin-off series. The plot centers around Jaden Yuki and his friends, and tells of their adventures at Duel Academy, a school that teaches students how to play the card game Duel Monsters. Season one covers their first year at the Academy. It was broadcast by 4Kids Entertainment as simply Yu-Gi-Oh! GX.

== Summary ==
The first half of the season begins with Jaden arriving as a freshman and being placed into the Slifer Red dorm. Jaden makes new friends and settles into his new life at the Academy. Despite getting low grades in class, he is recognized as a strong duelist by his peers. During the second half of the season, Jaden is selected to be one of the "Keykeepers", seven duelists who are charged with the duty of preventing the powerful Sacred Beast cards from falling into evil hands. The season ends with Jaden dueling against Zane Truesdale, the top student in the school.

== Episode list ==
No. overall	No. in season	English dub title / Japanese translated title	Written by	Original release date	American air date
1	1	"The Next King of Games" / "The One Who Inherits the Game"; Transliteration: "Yūgi o Tsugumono" (Japanese: 遊戯を継ぐ者)	Junki Takegami	October 6, 2004	October 10, 2005
Jaden Yuki is on his way to the Duel Academy entrance exams when he bumps into Yugi Muto, who gives him a special card, the Winged Kuriboh. Jaden hurries off to the exams, but arrives late. He is given one last chance to get into the Academy, but must first beat Professor Crowler in a duel. Crowler plays his best monster, the powerful Ancient Gear Golem, but Jaden is able to prevail using his new partner, Winged Kuriboh, and the power of his Elemental Hero deck.
2	2	"Welcome to Duel Academy" / "Flame Wingman"; Transliteration: "Fureimu Winguman" (Japanese: フレイム·ウィングマン)	Junki Takegami	October 10, 2004	October 11, 2005
Jaden arrives at Duel Academy and is placed in the Slifer Red dorm, where the drop-outs, slackers and poor duelists are sent. He stays in a dorm room with his new friends Syrus Truesdale and Chumley Huffington. It doesn't take long for Jaden to get into trouble - he is challenged to a duel by an Obelisk Blue student, Chazz Princeton, who wants to know if Jaden defeated Crowler through real skill or dumb luck.
3	3	"A Duel in Love" / "Etoile Cyber"; Transliteration: "Etowāru Saibā" (Japanese: エトワール·サイバー)	Atsushi Maekawa	October 20, 2004	October 12, 2005
Crowler is determined to get revenge on Jaden and expel him from the school. He leaves a fake love letter, claiming to be from Alexis, so he can catch Jaden out of his dorm after hours and thus have a reason to get rid of him. Syrus finds the letter instead, and Jaden ends up having to rescue his friend from the Obelisk Blue girls by dueling the queen of the Blue dorm, Alexis Rhodes.
4	4	"Making The Grade/Raring to Go" / "5 Polymers! VWXYZ"; Transliteration: "Go Jūgattai! Vi to Zi" (Japanese: 5重合体! VWXYZ)	Yasuyuki Suzuki	October 27, 2004	October 13, 2005
Jaden oversleeps and is late for an exam. Chazz still doesn't believe that such a slacker was able to beat Crowler. Chazz and Jaden face off in a duel again, but this time Chazz has a whole arsenal of new rare and powerful cards, thanks to Crowler. But Jaden has a new card too - Transcendent Wings, with the power to transform his Winged Kuriboh into the powerful Winged Kuriboh Level 10 and win! Jaden is able to promote to Ra Yellow, but refuses and decides to stay in Slifer Red, much to Syrus' happiness.
5	5	"The Shadow Duelist (Part 1 of 2)" / "A Dark Demon Deck"; Transliteration: "Yami no Dēmon Dekki" (Japanese: 闇のデーモンデッキ)	Shin Yoshida	November 3, 2004	October 17, 2005
At night, Jaden and his friends are taking turns telling ghost stories. Professor Banner joins them and tells a story about the Shadow Games and an abandoned fourth dorm at the Academy. Jaden, Syrus and Chumley go to see if his story is true or not, and they meet up with Alexis. She is looking for her brother who disappeared in that area. The four of them enter the abandoned dorm, and Alexis is captured by a man named Titan who clams to be a Shadow duelist and was hired by Crowler to get rid of Jaden after listening to Jaden going to the abandoned dorm. Jaden duels against him to free Alexis, but doesn't have much luck.
6	6	"The Shadow Duelist (Part 2 of 2)" / "The Miracle of Winged Kuriboh"; Transliteration: "Hane Kuribō no Kiseki" (Japanese: ハネクリボーの奇跡)	Shin Yoshida	November 10, 2004	October 18, 2005
Winged Kuriboh is able to shatter Titan's illusion and dispel his fake Shadow Game when it looks like it's over for Jaden. Jaden and Titan are then pulled into a real Shadow Game and Titan becomes possessed by the spirits of the dorm to continue the duel, but Jaden is able to win with the help of Winged Kuriboh. He is able to rescue Alexis and they escape together with Syrus and Chumley but Titan is left in the Shadow Realm. Jaden also promises to help Alexis find her missing brother, who disappeared in the abandoned dorm.
7	7	"Duel and Unusual Punishment" / "Sho's Vehicle Deck"; Transliteration: "Shō no Bīkuroido Dekki" (Japanese: 翔の乗り物デッキ)	Junki Takegami	November 17, 2004	October 19, 2005
Jaden and Syrus are in trouble again, for leaving their room after hours and entering the forbidden dorm. They will be expelled from the Academy unless they are able to win a tag team duel as arranged by the school committee. Syrus and Jaden go to practice against each other before their big duel. On the last move of their practice duel, Syrus draws Power Bond, but refuses to play it because his brother had told him he was not a strong enough duelist, and not worthy of its power.
8	8	"For the Sake of Syrus" / "Strongest! Cyber End Dragon"; Transliteration: "Saikyō! Saibā Endo Doragon" (Japanese: 最強! サイバーエンド·ドラゴン)	Yasuyuki Suzuki	November 24, 2004	October 20, 2005
Syrus is planning to leave the school because of what his brother said. Jaden feels sorry for him and goes to duel against Syrus' brother, Zane Truesdale - an Obelisk Blue and the best duelist in the school. However, Zane's powerful Cyber Dragon deck proves too much for Jaden to handle, and he loses the duel. Despite losing, Jaden maintains a positive outlook and says he had fun dueling, and this makes Syrus feel better too.
9	9	"Family Business" / "One Blow Certain Kill! Flipping the Table"; Transliteration: "Ichigeki Hissai! Chabudai Gaeshi" (Japanese: 一撃必殺! ちゃぶ台返し)	Atsushi Maekawa	December 1, 2004	October 21, 2005
Chumley's father believes he is a poor duelist because of his grades and wants him to leave Duel Academy and help run the family business. Jaden and Syrus don't want their friend to leave, so Chumley's father makes a deal with him - if Chumley can beat him in a duel, he can stay at the Academy. Chumley loses, but his father has seen his great spirit and allows him to stay anyway in pride.
10	10	"Tag Team Trial (Part 1 of 2)" / "Judai & Sho! Tag Duel (Part 1 of 2)"; Transliteration: "Jūdai to Shō! Taggu Dyueru (Zenpen)" (Japanese: 十代&翔! タッグデュエル (前編))	Akemi Omode	December 7, 2004	October 24, 2005
The day of Jaden and Syrus' tag duel has arrived. They are to duel against professional tag duelists, the Paradox Brothers. The duel begins. Syrus is losing his confidence and is afraid that he will cause Jaden to lose the duel. He becomes increasingly worried as the Paradox Brothers summon their strongest monster, the Gate Guardian. Jaden, however, is having a great time as usual and tells Syrus to cheer up. But it doesn't look good for them.
11	11	"Tag Team Trial (Part 2 of 2)" / "Judai & Sho! Tag Duel (Part 2 of 2)"; Transliteration: "Jūdai to Shō! Taggu Dyueru (Kōhen)" (Japanese: 十代&翔! タッグデュエル (後編))	Akemi Omode	December 14, 2004	October 25, 2005
The duel between Jaden, Syrus and the Paradox Brothers continues. Alexis and Chumley are worried that their friends may not be able to win. Chazz, on the other hand, is looking forward to seeing Jaden get crushed. Jaden and Syrus are getting badly beaten, but Jaden hasn't given up hope yet. Seeing this, Syrus is motivated and is able to destroy Gate Guardian, and eventually win the duel using Power Bond - proving to his brother that he is a strong duelist. By winning the duel, the boys are able to stay at the academy, much to the dismay of Chazz and Crowler.
12	12	"Formula for Success" / "Oxygen + Hydrogen = H²O Dragon"; Transliteration: "Sanso Purasu Suiso Ikōru Wōtā Doragon" (Japanese: 酸素+水素=H²Oドラゴン)	Shin Yoshida	December 22, 2004	October 26, 2005
Chazz is being berated by Crowler for losing to Jaden. If Chazz wants to keep his position in Obelisk Blue, he must defeat Ra's best student, Bastion Misawa, in a duel. Despite his cocky attitude, Chazz is defeated. Bastion passes up the chance to join the Blue Dorm, because he believes he will not be truly the best until he beats Jaden.
13	13	"Monkey See, Monkey Duel" / "Wild Release! SAL Duel!"; Transliteration: "Yasei Kaihō! Saru Dyueru" (Japanese: 野性解放! SALデュエル)	Atsushi Maekawa	December 29, 2004	October 27, 2005
Syrus spots Chazz taking his luggage and leaving the school after being defeated by Bastion. Jaden and Syrus sneak out of class to try to stop him, but are caught by Alexis and her friends, Jasmine and Mindy. Instead of sending Jaden and Syrus back to class, Alexis decides to join them in finding Chazz. They are interrupted by an experimental monkey named Wheeler wearing a Duel Disk who kidnaps Jasmine. Jaden duels against the monkey to rescue her, but while they are distracted, Chazz leaves the island. Wheeler is able to escape his owners and goes to live with his own kind.
14	14	"A Spirit Summoned" / "Vs. Psycho Shocker!?"; Transliteration: "Vāsasu Saiko Shokkā!?" (Japanese: VS サイコショッカー!?)	Yasuyuki Suzuki	January 5, 2005	October 28, 2005
Only a few students are left on the island over the winter break, Jaden and his friends included. They are enjoying their time off in the Slifer dorm cafeteria, when an Obelisk student rushes in, and explains that he and some of his Obelisk Blue friends were attempting to revive the spirit of Jinzo, the Psycho Shocker, but not really believing it would work. However, it was successful and now Jinzo has taken his friends' souls. The group heads out into the forest and finds Jinzo. Jaden defeats him in a duel and then erases him from existence when he tries to possess the Obelisk student to escape; his erasure releases the souls he took. The next morning, everyone thinks it was all a dream; but Jaden knows that it wasn't, and that duel spirits really do exist because he can see Winged Kuriboh's spirit.
15	15	"Courting Alexis" / "Duel Tennis of Youth"; Transliteration: "Seishun no Dyueru Tenisu" (Japanese: 青春のデュエルテニス)	Atsushi Maekawa	January 12, 2005	November 14, 2005
Jaden and Syrus are playing tennis, and Jaden complains that it has nothing to do with dueling. While he is distracted, he accidentally hits the ball towards Alexis. Another student named Herrington Rosewood deflects the ball away, but it ends up hitting Professor Crowler. Alexis thanks the other student for saving her, and he reveals that he has a crush on her. He decides to challenge Jaden to a duel in which the winner will become Alexis' fiancé. Jaden, not realizing exactly what he means, accepts the duel and wins. Afterwards, he asks Alexis what fiancé means, and she tells him that for now, it means friend.
16	16	"The Duel Giant" / "King Goblin of the Dark Night"; Transliteration: "Yamiyo no Kingu Goburin" (Japanese: 闇夜のキングゴブリン)	Akemi Omode	January 19, 2005	November 15, 2005
Several Obelisk students have been attacked and forced to duel using the ante rule, ending up having their rare cards taken. Meanwhile, Jaden is busy with lots of homework, but Professor Crowler promises to pass him if he finds out who has been defeating the Obelisk students (but realizes this could the opportunity for him to expel Jaden once and for all). Jaden, Syrus and Chumley head out in the middle of the night to face the so-called "Duel Giant", who is revealed to actually be two people, both Ra Yellow students who team up with each other after they were made fun of by other Obelisk Blue students. Jaden forgives them and lets them go free, and thus ends up having to still do homework for Professor Crowler.
17	17	"Nature of the Draw" / "Draw! Draw! Draw!"; Transliteration: "Dorō! Dorō! Dorō!" (Japanese: ドロー!ドロー!ドロー!)	Yasuyuki Suzuki	January 26, 2005	November 16, 2005
Jaden, Syrus, Chumley and Alexis hear about a student with an amazing ability to always draw the card he wants. They go out into the forest to find this mystery duelist, and discover that he has been living out in the wild for a long time perfecting his drawing technique. He wishes to duel against Jaden to show them his drawing skills. Jaden wins the duel, saying that he should learn to enjoy dueling more and not take everything so seriously.
18	18	"The King of the Copycats (Part 1 of 2)" / "Vs. Yugi's Deck (Part 1 of 2)"; Transliteration: "Vāsasu Yūgi Dekki (Zenpen)" (Japanese: VS 遊戯デッキ (前編))	Shin Yoshida	February 2, 2005	November 17, 2005
Yugi Muto's famous deck is going to be displayed at the Academy's Duel Museum. Syrus duels against a Ra student named Dimitri (a student who copies off the decks of others) to win Jaden tickets for the exhibition. Dimitri is dismayed that he was beaten by a Slifer. Bastion comforts him, but he is still determined to become a much better duelist. That night, he steals Yugi's deck, thinking it will help him win. Bastion, Jaden, Syrus and Chumley go out to look for him, and Jaden ends up in a duel to win Yugi's cards back. Dimitri, however, thinks he is the real Yugi and gains the upper hand with Yugi's powerful cards.
19	19	"The King of the Copycats (Part 2 of 2)" / "Vs. Yugi's Deck (Part 2 of 2)"; Transliteration: "Vāsasu Yūgi Dekki (Kōhen)" (Japanese: VS 遊戯デッキ (後編))	Shin Yoshida	February 9, 2005	November 18, 2005
Jaden is having a hard time defeating Yugi's powerful monsters, even when they are wielded by an amateur Ra Yellow. Jaden is finally able to win using E-Hero Flame Wingman. Dimitri is depressed and believes now that he has no talent at all, if he couldn't win with such powerful cards. Zane and Alexis show up as the duel ends. Jaden is surprised and wonders how they found him. Zane says that it was not just them, many other students were watching too. Jaden looks around and only now notices all the spectators. Jaden tells Dimitri that he should make his own deck and not copy off others, but Dimitri takes it the wrong way and begins copying Jaden in a poor way.
20	20	"The Maiden in Love" / "The Strong Deck with the Maiden in Love!"; Transliteration: "Koisuru Otome wa Tsuyoi no yo Dekki!" (Japanese: 恋する乙女は強いのよデッキ!)	Junki Takegami	February 16, 2005	November 21, 2005
A new transfer student, Blair Flannigan, joins the Slifer dorm. Jaden notes that the new boy looks a bit like a girl, and seems very interested in Zane. Jaden confronts Blair directly about this, and accidentally pulls his hat off, revealing his long hair and the fact that he is actually a she. Jaden duels with her, wishing to understand her better. Blair begins to take over Jaden's Monsters using her cards. He is able to win and Blair is afraid that he will tell people she is actually a girl. Jaden promises he won't. At this point, Zane shows up and Blair admits she has a crush on him. She also admits she is only in fifth grade. The next day, she leaves the Academy and promises to come back and enroll again when she is older, but now has a new crush on Jaden.
21	21	"The Duel Off (Part 1 of 2)" / "Fusion Seal! Judai vs. Misawa (Part 1 of 2)"; Transliteration: "Yūgō Fūji! Jūdai Vāsasu Misawa (Zenpen)" (Japanese: 融合封じ! 十代VS三沢(前編))	Akemi Omode	February 23, 2005	November 22, 2005
It has been announced that an interschool duel-off will be taking place, with a student from central Duel Academy facing a student from North Academy. Crowler, Chancellor Sheppard and the other teachers argue over who the school's representative should be - Jaden or Bastion. They decide to have a match between the two and the winner will duel North Academy's representative. Bastion immediately gets to work creating a deck to beat Jaden's Elemental Heroes. The next day, the duel begins. Bastion's strategy seems perfect - he blocks the use of Jaden's Polymerization, rendering his best monsters useless.
22	22	"The Duel Off (Part 2 of 2)" / "Summon Wildman! Judai vs. Misawa (Part 2 of 2)"; Transliteration: "Wairudoman Shōkan! Jūdai Vāsasu Misawa (Kōhen)" (Japanese: ワイルドマン召喚! 十代VS三沢(後編))	Akemi Omode	March 2, 2005	November 22, 2005
Jaden is having a tough time defeating Bastion's Water Dragon and Syrus is afraid he will lose. Despite being unable to use his fusion E-Heroes, Jaden pulls through and summons Wildheart, winning the duel. Zane and Bastion are greatly impressed by his dueling ability. Bastion tells Jaden he will make a new deck and duel him again, and that he looks forward to that day. Jaden is now the Academy's representative for the interschool duel.
23	23	"The Little Belowski" / "Exhaustion! Moke Moke Duel"; Transliteration: "Datsuryoku! Moke Moke Dyueru" (Japanese: 脱力! もけもけデュエル)	Yasuyuki Suzuki	March 9, 2005	December 8, 2005
Crowler is still determined to get rid of Jaden. He recruits Belowski to help him out. Jaden, meanwhile, is building his deck for his upcoming match. He is getting irritated with everyone interrupting him and goes up to the Academy roof for some peace and quiet. On the roof, he meets Belowski, who is able to see the spirit of Winged Kuriboh. Jaden is surprised by this. Belowski asks Jaden to duel against him, as he has never before dueled against anyone who can speak with monster spirits. Jaden's friends are also influenced by Belowski's calm and concentrated personality. Jaden is able to overcome Belowski's Moke Moke monsters to win the duel. Crowler's plans are thwarted once again. Note: The title is a pun on the movie "The Big Lebowski."
24	24	"The New Chazz" / "Revival! Manjoume Thunder"; Transliteration: "Fukkatsu! Manjōme Sandā" (Japanese: 復活! 万丈目サンダー)	Shin Yoshida	March 16, 2005	December 9, 2005
Chazz, still irritated by his losses to Bastion and Jaden, arrives at North Academy. In the sewers of the academy, the headmaster (disguised as a stranger) gives Chazz an Ojama Yellow card and is revealed it can speak to him, like Jaden can with Winged Kuriboh. This Academy has different rules to the one he knows. He must duel fifty students and then the school's champion if he hopes to prove himself and make it into North Academy. Chazz has no trouble defeating all his challengers, and finally the champion. He becomes the new champion of the school, and thus, North Academy's representative in the interschool duel with Central Academy.
25	25	"The School Duel (Part 1 of 2)" / "Vs. Manjoume Thunder (Part 1 of 2) - Threat of Armed Dragon " Transliteration: "Vāsasu Manjōme Sandā (Zenpen) Āmudo Doragon no Kyōi" (Japanese: VS万丈目サンダー(前編) アームドドラゴンの脅威)	Shin Yoshida	March 23, 2005	December 12, 2005
The day of the interschool duel arrives. Jaden tells his E-Heroes to do their best in the upcoming battle. When his opponent arrives from North Academy, he is shocked to discover that it is none other than Chazz, who has returned with a new deck, outfit, and nickname, "The Chazz" ("Manjoume Thunder" in the Japanese version). Chazz's brothers arrive to watch the duel, putting even more pressure on him. The battle begins, with Chazz summoning Armed Dragon LV3 and eventually upgrading it into the powerful Armed Dragon LV7.
26	26	"The School Duel (Part 2 of 2)" / "Vs. Manjoume Thunder (Part 2 of 2) - Armed Dragon LV7"; Transliteration: "Vāsasu Manjōme Sandā (Kōhen) Āmudo Doragon Reberu Sebun" (Japanese: VS万丈目サンダー(後編) アームドドラゴンLV7)	Shin Yoshida	March 30, 2005	December 13, 2005
"The Chazz" is decimating Jaden's monsters with his Armed Dragon LV7. Jaden eventually prevails using a combination of Flame Wingman and Hero Kid and wins the duel. Chazz is dismayed that he lost again and his brothers are furious with him. When the boat leaves to head back to North Academy, Chazz decides to stay at Central Academy because he still has things he wants to do there. However, due to his three-month absence, he is not permitted back into the Obelisk dorm and instead must join the Slifer dorm with Jaden and Syrus, much to his dismay.
27	27	"Grave Risk (Part 1 of 2)" / "The Extracurricular Class is a Dark Duel?! (Part 1 of 2)"; Transliteration: "Kagaijugyō wa Yami no Dyueru!? (Zenpen)" (Japanese: 課外授業は闇のデュエル!?(前編))	Junki Takegami	April 6, 2005	December 14, 2005
Professor Banner, Jaden, Syrus, Chumley and Alexis are on a field trip up on the volcano, looking at ancient ruins. Banner's cat, Pharaoh, is looking around and finds a glowing object on the ground. Three suns appear in the sky and the light shines over the group. Jaden loses consciousness and wakes up to find himself and Winged Kuriboh standing in front of a giant pyramid. A mysterious girl approaches him and explains that this is a sacred tomb and he should not be intruding here. The guards of the tomb arrive and surround Jaden. Their leader challenges him to a duel, and only if he wins he will be allowed to escape with his friends.
28	28	"Grave Risk (Part 2 of 2)" / "The Extracurricular Class is a Dark Duel?! (Part 2 of 2)"; Transliteration: "Kagaijugyō wa Yami no Dyueru!? (Kōhen)" (Japanese: 課外授業は闇のデュエル!?(後編))	Junki Takegami	April 13, 2005	December 15, 2005
The Gravekeeper's magic card Necrovalley is causing huge problems for Jaden, as he is unable to tribute monsters due to having his monsters sent to the graveyard. He uses the ability of Elemental Hero Necroshade to summon Blade-Edge without tributing, thus winning the duel. The Gravekeeper, accepting defeat, give Jaden half of a mysterious amulet. The spirits of Winged Kuriboh and Des Koala guide Jaden and his friends back to their own world.
29	29	"Doomsday Duel (Part 1 of 2)" / "Vs. Darkness (Part 1 of 2) - Challenge of the Red Eyes Black Dragon"; Transliteration: "Vāsasu Dākunesu (Zenpen) Reddo Aizu Burakku Doragon no Chōsen" (Japanese: VS ダークネス(前編)真紅眼の黒竜の挑戦)	Yasuyuki Suzuki	April 20, 2005	January 30, 2006
Jaden, Chazz, Bastion, Zane, Alexis, Banner and Crowler are all summoned to Chancellor Sheppard's office. The Chancellor explains to them about three legendary powerful cards, the "Sacred Beasts", that were sealed away underneath Duel Academy. He says that an evil group called the Seven Shadow Riders are planning to unseal them and use their power. He gives everyone one of the seven "Spirit Keys", which have the power to unlock the seal, and tells them to protect them from the Shadow Riders, as the keys only have power when won from their guardians in a duel. It doesn't take long for the first Shadow Rider, Nightshroud, to appear and challenge Jaden to a duel for his Spirit Key in exchange for Syrus and Chumley's lives. Plus, if Jaden loses, he will have his soul sealed inside a card.
30	30	"Doomsday Duel (Part 2 of 2)" / "Vs. Darkness (Part 2 of 2) - Attack of the Red Eyes Darkness Dragon"; Transliteration: "Vāsasu Dākunesu (Kōhen) Reddo Aizu Dākunesu Doragon no Kōgeki" (Japanese: VS ダークネス(後編)真紅眼の闇竜の攻撃)	Yasuyuki Suzuki	April 27, 2005	January 31, 2006
Jaden is slowly being beaten by Nightshroud and his Red-Eyes deck. But with his friends and the whole world in danger, Jaden can't afford to give up. By combining Wildheart, Blade-Edge and Skyscraper, he is able to win the duel. Nightshroud's evil soul is sealed into a card and when his mask is taken off, his true identity is revealed - Alexis' lost brother, Atticus Rhodes, who disappeared in the abandoned dorm and had been possessed by the evil spirit Nightshroud.
31	31	"Field of Screams (Part 1 of 3)" / "Cronos vs. Vampire Camula"; Transliteration: "Kuronosu Vāsasu Vanpaia Kamyūra" (Japanese: クロノスVS吸血美女カミューラ)	Natsuko Takahashi	May 4, 2005	February 1, 2006
As Jaden is recovering from his duel with Nightshroud, Crowler duels against the second Shadow Rider - a vampiress named Camula. Camula's Immortal Werewolf quickly reduces Crowler's Life Points to zero, and Crowler's soul is sealed into a toy doll. Jaden and Zane are enraged by this, and set out to defeat Camula and save their teacher. The title is a pun on the movie name Field of Dreams
32	32	"Field of Screams (Part 2 of 3)" / "Kaiser vs. Camula - The Phantom Gate Activates!"; Transliteration: "Kaizā Vāsasu Kamyūra Genma no Tobira Hatsudō!" (Japanese: カイザーVSカミューラ 幻魔の扉発動!)	Yuki Enatsu	May 11, 2005	February 2, 2006
Zane faces off against Camula to win back Crowler's soul, but is forced to make a terrible choice when she plays the dark spell card "Illusion Gate". The price for playing this card is high: if its owner loses the duel, it will take their soul, and Camula offers Syrus' soul in her place. Zane will not allow anything to happen to his brother, and throws the duel in order to protect him. Zane's soul is sealed into a doll similar to Crowler's, but this time Camula keeps it. Jaden swears revenge on Camula and promises to save Zane and Crowler.
33	33	"Field of Screams (Part 3 of 3)" / "Shine! Shining Flare Wingman"; Transliteration: "Kagayake! Shainingu Furea Winguman" (Japanese: 輝け!シャイニング·フレア·ウィングマン)	Junki Takegami	May 18, 2005	February 3, 2006
Atticus wakes from his coma and gives Jaden the second half of his pendant, which he had acquired during his time with the Shadow Riders. Meanwhile, everyone is arguing over who will duel Camula next to free Zane and Crowler. Jaden decides to take the risk - and prevails. Camula's soul is taken by the Illusion Gate, while Zane and Crowler are changed back to normal.
34	34	"The Fear Factor" / "Hot Springs Sentiments! Blue Eyes White Dragon"; Transliteration: "Yukemuri Ryojō! Burū Aizu Howaito Doragon" (Japanese: 湯けむり旅情! 青眼の白龍)	Yuki Enatsu	May 25, 2005	February 6, 2006
Faced with anxiety about the next Shadow Rider duels, Jaden tries to relax in the Academy Hot Springs with Syrus, Chazz and Chumley. The spirits of Winged Kuriboh, Ojama Yellow and Des Koala appear and everyone is pulled down under the water and into the spirit world where all the duel monster spirits live. One of these monsters is Kaibaman, who has the voice, form and dueling deck of Seto Kaiba. He challenges Jaden to a duel to help him get his fighting spirit back. Despite a valiant effort by Jaden, he is defeated, but has regained his confidence and is ready to face the rest of the Shadow Riders. Jaden and his friends are then taken back to their world.
35	35	"Sibling Rivalry" / "Union of Brothers! Ojama Delta Hurricane"; Transliteration: "Kyōdai no Kessoku! Ojama Deruta Harikēn" (Japanese: 兄弟の結束! おジャマデルタハリケーン)	Shin Yoshida	June 1, 2005	February 7, 2006
Chazz's brothers, Slade and Jagger, want to take over Duel Academy. The Academy's current owner, Seto Kaiba, has proposed a deal - one of the students would duel against Slade, and if Slade won he and Jagger would be allowed to buy out the Academy. The chosen student is Chazz, but there is one more rule: he must use monsters with less than 500 attack points. Chazz builds a new deck of seemingly weak monsters by using cards that others have thrown away, including the Ojama Trio (he finds Ojama Yellow's brothers, Ojama Green and Ojama Black, who also can talk to Chazz). He faces his brother and wins, not only saving the school, but proving that the strength of a duelist does not come solely from his cards, but also from his heart.
36	36	"Duel Distractions (Part 1 of 2)" / "Misawa vs. Amazoness! Marrying for a Son-in-Law Duel"; Transliteration: "Misawa-chi Vāsasu Amazonesu Mukotori Dyueru" (Japanese: 三沢っちVSアマゾネス! ムコとり決闘)	Yasuyuki Suzuki	June 8, 2005	February 8, 2006
Bastion is worried about when the third Shadow Rider will show up, so he takes Jaden, Syrus and Chumley out for some practice dueling. Later, in class, Banner is surprised to find that most of his students are missing. He takes Jaden and the others with him to go and find out what is happening. They are confronted by the third Shadow Rider, Amazoness Tanya, who selects Bastion to duel against her. Bastion develops a crush on Tanya and this causes him to become distracted, losing the duel and his spirit key.
37	37	"Duel Distractions (Part 2 of 2)" / "Human Bullet Duel! Amazoness Death Ring"; Transliteration: "Nikudan Dyueru! Amazonesu no Desu Ringu" (Japanese: 肉弾決闘! アマゾネスのデスリング)	Natsuko Takahashi	June 15, 2005	February 9, 2006
Bastion is very worried and distressed that he was defeated by Tanya. Jaden decides to be the one to challenge her this time. After a very tough duel, Jaden is the victor. Tanya, accepting Jaden as a great duelist, is released from her human body and into her true form - a white tiger. Jaden thanks her for the excellent duel and Bastion is shocked to discover that he lost to a tiger.
38	38	"Get Yarr Game On!" / "Underwater Duel! The Legendary City Atlantis"; Transliteration: "Suichū Dyueru! Densetsu no Miyako Atorantisu" (Japanese: 水中デュエル! 伝説の都アトランティス)	Atsushi Maekawa	June 22, 2005	February 10, 2006
Jaden and Syrus are having an argument, when suddenly a submarine arrives at Academy Island. The captain of the submarine claims he is here for a duel. Jaden believes he is one of the Shadow Riders and duels against him on board of the submarine. It turns out that the captain is in fact not a Shadow Rider at all; it was just a misunderstanding. His dream is to build an underwater Duel Academy and he wants Jaden to become a teacher for the school since he is such a powerful duelist. The submarine leaves the island with Jaden still on board. He wins the duel but his friends were told that he stayed so they left on the boat for the island. Syrus is sad that the last thing he did with his friend was fight with him. However, a week later, Jaden returns to the island, explains what happened and Syrus cheers up.
39	39	"The Dark Scorpions" / "Detective Thunder vs. The Black Scorpion Grave Robber Organization"; Transliteration: "Meitantei Sandā Vāsasu Kurosasori Tōkutsu-dan" (Japanese: 名探偵サンダーVS黒サソリ盗掘団)	Shin Yoshida	June 29, 2005	February 27, 2006
The remaining four keys are stolen and Chazz and the Ojamas decide to figure who is behind it. After a series of false deductions, they are confronted by Don Zaloog, the fourth Shadow Rider and leader of the "Dark Scorpion Grave Robbers", a group of duel monster spirits. Don Zaloog realises he must defeat Chazz if he want to use the power of the spirit keys, and so a duel between them commences. Chazz triumphs by fusing his Ojama trio into Ojama King. The Dark Scorpions decide to join Chazz and hang out in his room with the Ojamas and the other monster spirits, much to Chazz's annoyance.
40	40	"A Lying Legend" / "H-E-R-O Flash!"; Transliteration: "Eichi-Ī-Aru-Ō Furasshu!" (Japanese: H·E·R·Oフラッシュ!)	Yuki Enatsu	July 6, 2005	February 28, 2006
Jaden is challenged by Abidos, the fifth Shadow Rider. According to Professor Banner, Abidos was a legendary pharaoh who never lost a duel. As they duel for the spirit keys, Jaden discovers that Abidos isn't as strong as he seems, which makes Abidos come to the realization that his servants let him win out of fear of his power. Jaden defeated him using his H-E-R-O Flash combo and promised to maybe duel Abidos again someday.
41	41	"A Reason to Win" / "The Dark Arena Activates! Asuka vs. Titan"; Transliteration: "Dāku Arīna Hatsudō! Asuka Vāsasu Taitan" (Japanese: 闇の闘牛場発動! 明日香VSタイタン)	Junki Takegami	July 13, 2005	March 1, 2006
Atticus has lost his memory and Alexis goes to the forbidden dorm where he disappeared originally. She gets sucked into a mysterious dark realm, where she duels Titan, who has disappeared after his duel with Jaden and has now become the sixth Shadow Rider. His darkness monsters were overcoming her, but Alexis pulled through and defeated him, and was sent back to the Shadow Realm. Afterwards, Atticus remembered who asked him to come to the dorm in the first place, Professor Banner.
42	42	"Duel Monsters Spirit Day" / "School Festival Duel! Blamagigirl Intrudes"; Transliteration: "Gakuensai Dyueru! Buramajigāru Rannyū" (Japanese: 学園祭デュエル! ブラマジガール乱入)	Natsuko Takahashi	July 20, 2005	March 2, 2006
Banner has disappeared, but the students take time off to enjoy the Spirit Day Festival, where students dress up as their favorite duel monsters and duel for celebration. Jaden duels against the spirit of the Dark Magician Girl, but after beating her, he realises that she was a real spirit after all.
43	43	"Hearts are Wild" / "A Second Love Chance for Asuka!?"; Transliteration: "Asuka ni Sekando Rabu Chansu!?" (Japanese: 明日香にセカンド·ラブ·チャンス!?)	Yasuyuki Suzuki	July 27, 2005	March 3, 2006
One of Alexis' old classmates from her childhood is back to duel her. The Gambler (Pierre) stole Alexis' mother's red cloth and she duels him to get it back. She beats Pierre and gets her cloth back.
44	44	"The Seventh Shadow Rider" / "The Shadow of the Seventh"; Transliteration: "Shichininme no Kage" (Japanese: 7人目の影)	Yuki Enatsu	August 3, 2005	March 27, 2006
The Key Holders begin to search for Banner and discover that he left behind a piece of paper with the mark of Amnael, a famous duel alchemist. Alexis is also looking for Atticus, who mysteriously disappeared again. When Chazz and Alexis both see the mark around the forest, they're challenged by a mysterious stranger to a duel and both of them lose in an instant and disappear into Amnael's book.
45	45	"Amnael's Endgame (Part 1 of 2)" / "Vs. Amnael! Absolute Seal of E-Hero"; Transliteration: "Vāsasu Amunaeru! Erementaru Hīrō Zettai Fūji" (Japanese: VSアムナエル! Eヒーロー絶対封じ)	Shin Yoshida	August 10, 2005	March 28, 2006
Jaden and his friends find the mark of Amnael and follow it to a hidden area where they discover the mummified body of Professor Banner. Amneal, the masked stranger and the Seventh Shadow Rider, appears to challenge Jaden, who proves to be quite an opponent with his alchemy deck. Amnael then takes off his mask and reveals himself to be Professor Banner.
46	46	"Amnael's Endgame (Part 2 of 2)" / "Earth/Water/Fire/Wind Fusion! Elixirer"; Transliteration: "Tsuienfū Yūgō! Erikushīrā" (Japanese: 地水炎風融合! エリクシーラー)	Shin Yoshida	August 17, 2005	March 29, 2006
Banner explained that a long time ago, he discovered the Sacred Beast Cards. While examining them, he breathed in a poison that crippled his body. Banner made a Homunculus, an artificial body, to transfer his soul, but he needs the Sacred Beast cards to live because of his crumbling body. He continues to beat Jaden using his Cosmo monsters and tells Jaden that all of his duels were fixed. Jaden doesn't believe it and fuses four of his hero monsters into Electrum to win. Afterwards, Banner started to fall apart and told Jaden that he lied before and that Jaden's duels were a test to be sure that he be ready for the final battle. Banner joined the Shadow riders because he wanted to defeat their leader and before he crumbled away, he gave Jaden an ancient tome to help aid him. Banner's spirit was then eaten by his cat, Pharaoh. Chazz, Alexis and Atticus are freed and go back to their world.
47	47	"Chazz-anova" / "Asuka vs. Manjoume! Cyber Angel -Benten-"; Transliteration: "Asuka Vāsasu Manjōme! Saibā Enjeru Benten" (Japanese: 明日香VS万丈目! サイバー·エンジェル-弁天-)	Yasuyuki Suzuki	August 24, 2005	March 30, 2006
Chazz realises that he's in love with Alexis. With a little help from her brother, Atticus, Chazz steals the Spirit Keys to lure her into a duel with him. He uses these different cards to show that he was in love with her, but Alexis brushes it off. She defeats him and tells him that the only thing she was in love with was dueling. Afterwards, the 7 keys activated and the whole island began to shake.
48	48	"Rise of the Sacred Beasts (Part 1 of 2)" / "Vs. Kagemaru (Part 1 of 2) - Two Phantom Demons"; Transliteration: "Vāsasu Kagemaru (Zenpen) Futatsu no Genma" (Japanese: VS影丸(前編)2つの幻魔)	Shin Yoshida	August 31, 2005	March 31, 2006
The seven keys had finally unlocked the Sacred Beast cards from underground. Kagemaru, leader of the Shadow Riders and superintendent of Duel Academy, appeared to steal the cards. Since the beast cards feed off duel energy, he built the school and hid the cards underneath it so that they would get stronger. He duels Jaden using two of the beasts, Uria and Hamon, and then uses their power to make himself younger.
49	49	"Rise of the Sacred Beasts (Part 2 of 2)" / "Vs. Kagemaru (Part 2 of 2) - Three Phantom Demons Awakens"; Transliteration: "Vāsasu Kagemaru (Kōhen) Sangenma Kakusei" (Japanese: VS影丸(後編)三幻魔覚醒)	Shin Yoshida	September 7, 2005	April 3, 2006
As Kagemaru and Jaden duel, the Sacred Beast cards continue to drain the energy of every monster card in the world. If Jaden doesn't defeat the beasts, all the cards will be gone for good. Kagemaru reveals the third beast, Raviel, and continues to gain the upper hand, but then Jaden is visit by the spirit of Professor Banner, whose soul is now trapped in his cat, Pharaoh's, body. Banner hid a special card in the tome he gave Jaden, so Jaden uses its power to summon Electrum and win the duel. Afterwards, Sheppard decides to guard the cards himself for the time being.
50	50	"Magna Chum Laude" / "Hayato vs. Cronos! Ayers Rock Sunrise"; Transliteration: "Hayato Vāsasu Kuronosu! Eāzu Rokku Sanraizu" (Japanese: 隼人VSクロノス!エアーズロックサンライズ)	Junki Takegami, Ema Baba	September 14, 2005	April 4, 2006
Chumley wins a drawing contest with Industrial Illusions and Pegasus wants to hire him to be a card designer. Crowler doesn't believe Chumley deserves the job due to his inadequate dueling skills but is willing to give his recommendation if Chumley could beat him in a duel. With a little help from Jaden, Chumley duels and learns to use his cards more effectively. Crowler still beats him, but he gives the recommendation anyway and Chumley says goodbye to his friends as he headed off to his new job.
51	51	"The Graduation Match (Part 1 of 2)" / "Vs. Kaiser (Part 1 of 2) - Power Bond x Cyber End"; Transliteration: "Vāsasu Kaizā (Zenpen) Pawā Bondo ando Saibā Endo" (Japanese: VSカイザー(前編)パワー·ボンド×サイバーエンド)	Natsuko Takahashi	September 21, 2005	April 5, 2006
Zane's Graduation Duel is coming up, and he's selected Jaden as his opponent, due to his skills. Jaden gets nervous about dueling the best student in the school, but he keeps a level head and agrees to duel. During the duel, Jaden seems to duel much more differently and it turns out, he was trying to duel with his head, more than his heart. Zane felt it was a waste of time and readied his Power Bonded Cyber End Dragon to end the duel.
52	52	"The Graduation Match (Part 2 of 2)" / "Vs. Kaiser (Part 2 of 2) - Final Fusion"; Transliteration: "Vāsasu Kaizā (Kōhen) Fainaru Fyūjon" (Japanese: VSカイザー(後編)ファイナル·フュージョン)	Natsuko Takahashi	September 28, 2005	April 6, 2006
Jaden starts to duel the same way he's always dueled and makes things worthwhile. It comes down to a clash between Shining Flare Wingman and Cyber End Dragon. After a back and forth match of trap and magic cards, to keep their respective monsters on the field, the match finally ended in a tie. Zane was glad to have a good match before he graduated and moved on from Duel Academy.
