= Yu-Gi-Oh! Duel Monsters season 5 =

Yu-Gi-Oh! Grand Championship Yu-Gi-Oh! Dawn of the Duel
- Season 5
- No. of episodes: 40

Release
- Original network: TV Tokyo
- Original release: December 24, 2003 – September 29, 2004

Season chronology
- ← Previous; Season 4 Next → Yu-Gi-Oh! GX; Season 1

The fifth and final season of Yu-Gi-Oh! Duel Monsters, loosely based on the manga by Kazuki Takahashi, aired in Japan on TV Tokyo from December 24, 2003, to September 29, 2004. The official name of the latter arc of the season is Pharaoh's Memories arc. In the United States, the season aired from August 27, 2005, to June 10, 2006, on Kids' WB. The arcs were broken up and broadcast as Grand Championship (episodes 1–14) and Dawn of the Duel (episodes 15-40). Reruns also included Capsule Monsters, an addendum to the first half commissioned by 4Kids.

The season was formerly licensed by 4Kids Entertainment in North America and other English-speaking countries and territories, and was formerly distributed by Funimation on Region 1 home video, and also distributed by Warner Bros. Television Animation on US television when it aired on The WB, from the Kids' WB! Lineup, also in North America. It is now licensed and distributed by 4K Media, Inc.

This arc is divided into two halves: the first fourteen episodes were aired while the final chapters of the manga were being written, with the main antagonist defeated. It follows an original story arc in-which Kaiba hosts a new tournament that is secretly being sabotaged by a skilled duelist named Zigfried, who uses his hacking skills in an attempt to enact revenge against Kaiba.

The rest of the season, the climax, features The Pharaoh battling Yami Bakura, while Yugi and his friends travel the memory world to discover the Pharaoh's real name. It aired after the time when the original manga series concluded.

== Episode list ==
Excludes Capsule Monsters. The season would be 52 episodes in length with an episode count of 236 if Capsule Monsters is to be included.

No. overall	No. in season	Title	Written by	Original release date	American air date
KC Grand Championship
185	1	"Unwanted Guest, Part 1"; Transliteration: "KC Grand Prix Opens" (Japanese: KCグランプリ開幕)	Akemi Omode	December 24, 2003	August 27, 2005
Stranded following the events of the Orichalcos, the Kaibas extend to Joey and Yugi an invitation for the Kaiba Grand Championship (KC Grand Prix in Japan) in exchange for tickets back home. One of the attractions is a duel computer that allows novices to refine their duelling skills. However, an enigmatic hacker locks all the guests in and sets the difficulty to Expert, leaving the amateur duelist Rick facing an immensely difficult task. Yugi duels instead, but he uses Rick's deck: full of Dragons and next-to-no magic and trap cards!
186	2	"Unwanted Guest, Part 2"; Transliteration: "The Start of a Conspiracy" (Japanese: 動きだした陰謀)	Akemi Omode	January 7, 2004	August 27, 2005
Due to Rick stacking his deck with Dragons and only one magic card, Yugi is backed into a corner by the Expert-difficulty duel computer who forces Yugi to discard his hand. Yugi activates the card he gave to Rick, Heart of the Underdog, to power up his Spirit Ryu and restore the computer to normal.
187	3	"Let the Games Begin!, Part 1"; Transliteration: "Jonouchi vs. Mask the Rock" (Japanese: 城之内vsマスク·ザ·ロック)	Yasuyuki Suzuki	January 14, 2004	September 3, 2005
The Grand Championship starts in earnest with Joey facing off against the mysterious Apdnarg Otom; or Grandpa (Solomon) Moto backwards, who allegedly begged to be in the tournament. Solomon turns Joey's reliance on luck against him and leads an assault with the Ancient Giant.
188	4	"Let the Games Begin!, Part 2"; Transliteration: "The Illusionary Ancient Dragon" (Japanese: 幻の古代竜(エンシェント・ドラゴン))	Yasuyuki Suzuki	January 21, 2004	September 3, 2005
Joey is being beaten by his former teacher Solomon Moto, who sacrifices most of his cards to Summon the legendary Ancient Dragon, a card he's been waiting to play for years. Slowly Joey begins a comeback, using Gilford the Lightning to destroy the Dragon, but it's futile as it immediately resurrects itself with Ancient City. Joey counters this by returning it to Solomon's hand with Giant Trunade, and launching a double assault with Gilford the Lightning and Goblin Attack Force.
189	5	"Child's Play"; Transliteration: "Hot Battle! Rebecca vs. Vivian" (Japanese: 熱闘! レベッカvsヴィヴィアン)	Akemi Omode	January 28, 2004	September 10, 2005
Rebecca is duelling against the Asian champion, Vivian Wong, not just for a place in the next round, but for Yugi's heart. Rebecca uses a clever strategy to gain Life Points and burn away Vivian's each round, and even when Vivian hinders it with Dragon Lady, Rebecca makes a winning counter with Guardian Angel Joan. Rex and Weevil have sneaked into the tournament against rules under another competitor, and despite both duelling Zigfried Lloyd, he obliterates both of them in one turn with a single card: Ride of the Valkyries (Walkuren Ritt in the Japanese Version).
190	6	"Down in Flames, Part 1"; Transliteration: "Jonouchi vs. Sieg — A Beautiful Duel" (Japanese: 城之内vsジーク 華麗なる決闘(デュエル))	Akemi Omode	February 4, 2004	September 10, 2005
Joey is pitted against Zigfried, who previously defeated two duelists in one move using one card. After a bad start, the facilities around KaibaLand go haywire, even putting the duelists themselves in danger: all Zigfried's work in an attempt to give Kaiba a 'hint'. After Joey makes a stinging direct attack with Jinzo, Zigfried focuses back on the duel, playing the Ride of the Valkyries card he used last time against Rex and Weevil, which easily defeated them in one turn.
191	7	"Down in Flames, Part 2"; Transliteration: "The Goddesses of Monster Extermination" (Japanese: モンスター抹殺の女神)	Akemi Omode	February 11, 2004	September 17, 2005
With the aid of his Hyper Refresh, Joey survives with only 800 Life Points remaining. Zigfried decides to try a different tactic.
192	8	"A Brawl in a Small Town, Part 1"; Transliteration: "Genius Girl(Rebecca) vs. Genius Boy(Leon)" (Japanese: 天才少女(レベッカ)vs天才少年(レオン))	Yasuyuki Suzuki	February 18, 2004	September 17, 2005
The Elite Eight in the KC Grand Championship have been filtered down to four Semi-Finalists: Zigfried Lloyd against Balfry Ginger, and the child prodigies Rebecca and Leon. Rebecca's gain-and-drain strategy is torn asunder by Leon's fairytale-based cards. In another attempt, Rebecca uses her Dragons, but Leon Summons Cinderella in response who attacks Rebecca directly repeatedly. Meanwhile, Yugi's grandfather has mysteriously gone missing.
193	9	"A Brawl in a Small Town, Part 2"; Transliteration: "Leon in Fairyland" (Japanese: おとぎの国のレオン)	Yasuyuki Suzuki	February 25, 2004	September 24, 2005
Vivian is revealed to have taken Grandpa from the hospital to act as bait for Yugi to duel her; in exchange, she would heal Grandpa's back. The two duel and Yugi uses her strategy of discarding Dragons to the Graveyard to his advantage with Dark Paladin. Leon is royally trouncing Rebecca but the latter refuses to give in, more so when Yugi finally arrives to cheer her on. Heartened, Rebecca Summons her Diamond Head Dragon and launches a brutal assault, but Leon ultimately triumphs with Thorn Princess. Leon will now face Zigfried in the finals.
194	10	"One Step Ahead, Part 1"; Transliteration: "Kaiba Intrudes! The Grand Prix Final" (Japanese: 海馬乱入! グランプリ決勝戦)	Yasuyuki Suzuki	March 3, 2004	September 24, 2005
Kaiba stops the match, disqualifying Zigfried for using an alias and revealing him as Zigfried von Schroder, Kaiba's former arch-rival and the tournament saboteur. The two then duel to determine whether Zigfried stays in the tournament. Kaiba summons his XYZ-Dragon Cannon, but Zigfried uses the Nibelung's Ring and his Three Goddesses to remove Kaiba's cards.
195	11	"One Step Ahead, Part 2"; Transliteration: "Walkure vs. Blue Eyes White Dragon" (Japanese: 戦女神(ワルキューレ)vs青眼の白龍(ブルーアイズ・ホワイトドラゴン))	Yasuyuki Suzuki	March 10, 2004	October 1, 2005
Kaiba calls his immensely powerful Chaos Emperor Dragon — Envoy of the End to reset the playing field, destroying Zigfried's hand, his field, and even his ace card Valkyrie Brunnhilde. Zigfried ups his play by reviving his Valkyrie and forcing both players to predict how many Magic Cards they think they'll play or take serious damage if they're incorrect. Seto uses a combo of Soul Release, Spell Reproduction and Dimension Fusion to Summon five Dragons at once, and together they destroy Brunnhilde and win the duel.
196	12	"Sinister Secrets, Part 1"; Transliteration: "The Final Battle for Duel King — Yugi vs. Leon" (Japanese: デュエルキング決定戦 遊戯vsレオン)	Akemi Omode	March 17, 2004	October 1, 2005
Leon is stopped by Zigfried and is given a card to add to his deck, for his battle against Yugi for the title of World Champion. Leon is unusually bitter about it, and oddly, considering his last duel, doesn't appear to be enjoying himself. He launches countless assaults, replacing destroyed monsters with more fairytale creatures and reveals he, too, is a Von Schroder. Despite this, Kaiba cannot call off the match as that is against the tournament rules.
197	13	"Sinister Secrets, Part 2"; Transliteration: "The Gold Castle of Stromberg" (Japanese: シュトロームベルクの金の城)	Akemi Omode	March 24, 2004	October 8, 2005
Leon reveals his motivation to duel, stemming from being ignored by his family in favor of the smart, highly gifted and talented Zigfried. To distract himself, Leon became engrossed in fairytales, and started dueling following the creation of a set of fairytale cards. He initially believed this was earning Zigfried's respect, but in reality, his older brother saw him as little more than a tool for destroying KaibaCorp. Determined to earn his elder brother's love, Leon plays an illegal Field Spell: The Golden Castle of Stromberg, which infects KaibaCorp's systems with an extremely powerful and dangerous computer virus that rapidly deletes the files and can't be destroyed by card or trap effects.
198	14	"Sinister Secrets, Part 3"; Transliteration: "KC Grand Prix Ends" (Japanese: KCグランプリ終結)	Akemi Omode	March 31, 2004	October 8, 2005
Yugi decides to help Leon get rid of the Golden Castle of Stromberg, but this proves to be challenging as not only is it unaffected by card effects, it forces all monsters to battle and discards half of Yugi's Deck each turn. This proves to be its undoing, however, as he's left with one card and so can't discard half of it, destroying the card. Leon fights valiantly but loses to Yugi's Dark Magician. Zigfried claims they just had a mild setback, though Kaiba reveals his data's safe. Leon helps Zigfried realize even if he succeeded, he would've felt hurt in the end, as strength is about learning from your mistakes, not crushing others. The group then heads for Cairo.
Dawn of the Duel
199	15	"Tomb of the Nameless Pharaoh"; Transliteration: "Ultimate Game" (Japanese: 究極のゲーム)	Shin Yoshida	April 7, 2004	October 15, 2005
Bakura tries to escape the returning spirit of the Millennium Ring, Yami Bakura, who tells him they still had to obtain all of the seven Millennium Items. At the moment, they had only one, the Millennium Eye. When Bakura refuses to help, Yami Bakura forcibly takes over his mind and body. Yugi's grandfather tells him the story of how he entered the tomb of the Nameless Pharaoh and discovered the Millennium Puzzle. Yugi prepares for his trip to Egypt in order to restore the Pharaoh's memories. Rex and Weevil return and steal Yugi's bag containing the Egyptian God cards and Millennium Items. However, their plans are thwarted when Yami Bakura shows up and reclaims the Millennium Ring. Then, he uses it to send both of their souls to the Shadow Realm. When Yugi shows up and asks if he was Bakura, Yami Bakura states he was not.
200	16	"Spiritual Awakening"; Transliteration: "The Dark Bakura on the Move" (Japanese: 動きだした闇のバクラ)	Shin Yoshida	April 14, 2004	October 22, 2005
Yami Bakura returns Yugi's belongings, minus the Millennium Ring, as he states he still needs it until Yugi obtains all seven of the Millennium Items. Then, he tries to persuade Yugi to help, using a combination of both facts and lies. However, Yugi refuses to trust him. Yami Bakura tells the Pharaoh that the only way to regain his memory is to play a game (the Ultimate Shadow Game) before departing. Then, Yami Bakura kidnaps Mokuba and sends his soul to the Shadow Realm, which forces Kaiba to duel him. Yami Bakura turns the duel into a Shadow Game, and tells Kaiba that if he wins, then he will return Mokuba's soul. Planning to claim the great power of the Blue-Eyes White Dragon as his own, and to have Kaiba join "The Ultimate Shadow Game", Bakura attacks using a new deck of Egyptian-themed cards, including his "tablet" trap cards, and his spirit beast, Diabound Kernel. Diabound is able to absorb half of the power of Blue-Eyes each time it activates its ability, even as Kaiba manages to fight back. However, as the Sun rises, Bakura abandons the duel, stating that he had other "business" to attend to. However, he leaves a parting gift for Kaiba — the Millennium Eye, and tells him to come to Egypt if he wants to learn about his ancient past. As Yugi was about to board a flight to Cairo, Egypt, he meets up with Tea, Joey, and Tristan. They refuse to let him leave on his own.
201	17	"Memoirs of a Pharaoh"; Transliteration: "The Door of Memory Opens" (Japanese: 開かれた記憶の扉)	Shin Yoshida	April 21, 2004	October 29, 2005
The Pharaoh, Yugi, Tea, Joey, and Tristan arrive in Egypt and meet up with Marik. The Pharaoh presents the Egyptian God cards to the stone tablet, and his spirit is sent five thousand years into the past, to when he was still alive and reigned as King of Egypt, even as Yami Bakura uses his connection to the Pharaoh's Millennium Puzzle to hitch a ride back into the past, intending to finish the battle he started then. Yami Bakura's departure into the past causes the spirits of Rex Raptor, Weevil Underwood, and Mokuba to be released from the Shadow Realm (not shown on screen). Later, Yami Bakura completely takes over the body of his ancient alter ego, Bakura the Thief King, and frees him from his guards. Soon, his minions arrive, and free him from his chains. Then, Thief King Bakura (now under the control of Yami Bakura) raids the previous Pharaoh's tomb and heads off to the royal palace to claim the seven Millennium Items.
202	18	"The Intruder, Part 1"; Transliteration: "Thief King Bakura Enters!" (Japanese: 盗賊王バクラ見参!)	Shin Yoshida	April 28, 2004	November 5, 2005
Thief King Bakura, arrives at the palace to claim the Millennium Items for himself. The priests engage him in battle, but Bakura the Thief King's spirit beast, Diabound, proves too much for them to handle, until the Pharaoh steps in and summons Obelisk the Tormentor. However, Obelisk happens to be evenly matched with Bakura's Diabound, which is enhanced with power that it stole from Kaiba's Blue-Eyes White Dragon, during Yami Bakura's previous Duel with Seto Kaiba. Meanwhile, the spirits of Yugi and the others enter the Millennium Puzzle, thanks to the help of Shadi and his Millennium Key, in search of a doorway into the Pharaoh's memories, which would take them to the memory world that the Pharaoh had entered.
203	19	"The Intruder, Part 2"; Transliteration: "Mahado's Decision" (Japanese: マハードの決意)	Yasuyuki Suzuki	May 5, 2004	November 12, 2005
Bakura's Diabound fights against the Pharaoh's Obelisk, but their power is equal, and Bakura is forced to retreat. Mana, a magician and also a childhood friend of the Pharaoh's, arrives to visit the palace. Mahad decides to help protect the former Pharaoh's tomb, despite Priest Isis' visions of his fate. Mahad's men take on Bakura's minions, while Mahad is trapped with Bandit Bakura.
204	20	"Makings of a Magician"; Transliteration: "Battle to the Death! Mahad vs. Bakura" (Japanese: 死闘! マハードvsバクラ)	Yasuyuki Suzuki	May 12, 2004	November 19, 2005
Mahad unlocks his full power using the Millennium Ring, and forces Bakura the Thief King to face him by trapping them both inside the academy where magicians used to be trained (inside of a cavern). Mahad draws upon his Millennium Ring to completely unearth his full powers, which he had sealed away within the academy for his own safety. Mahad's Illusion Magician faces off against Bakura's Diabound, which has grown in strength since his battle with the Pharaoh. However, Mahad's Illusion Magician has also grown in strength since then, but Bakura's Diabound is still the strongest monster on the field. Diabound gains the upper hand, and Thief King Bakura finishes the job by deliberately setting off the tomb's traps. To save himself, Mahad fuses his soul with his spirit beast, the Illusion Magician, transforming himself into the Dark Magician, which made him much more powerful than Bakura's Diabound, much to Bakura's disbelief. Bakura the Thief takes the Millennium Ring, however, Mahad as Dark Magician is able to destroy Bakura's Diabound, which causes the cavern to collapse. Thief King Bakura barely manages to escape, while Mahad's soul is sealed into the stone tablet meant for Diabound.
205	21	"Birth of the Blue-Eyes"; Transliteration: "Blue-Eyed Kisara" (Japanese: 青い瞳のキサラ)	Shin Yoshida	May 19, 2004	November 26, 2005
Mana is distraught at the loss of her master. Priest Isis explains that he has become the Dark Magician and will eventually return with even greater magical powers and spells than ever before. Priests Seto and Shada head out into the city to search for people with strong spirit beasts. Seto meets a white-haired, blue-eyed young girl named Kisara who is shunned by the citizens. Meanwhile, Shadi guides Yugi and the others to the doorway, into the Memory World of the Pharaoh's past, and begin searching for the Pharaoh.
206	22	"Village of Lost Souls"; Transliteration: "The Secret of the Creation of the Millennium Items" (Japanese: 千年アイテム誕生の秘密)	Shin Yoshida	May 26, 2004	December 3, 2005
Thief King Bakura breaks into the palace again and attacks Priest Aknadin, infusing part of his evil soul into the Millennium Eye. The Pharaoh summons Slifer the Sky Dragon to chase after Bakura and Diabound. When Bakura begins targeting the villagers, Slifer is forced to take Diabound's attacks in order to defend the helpless people. The wounded Aknadin reminisces about the creation of the Millennium Items through the destruction of Kul Elna, and how he was forced to abandon his wife and his own son, Seto.
207	23	"A Reversal of Fortune"; Transliteration: "Wound Back Time" (Japanese: 巻き戻る時間)	Atsushi Maekawa	June 2, 2004	December 10, 2005
Priest Seto and Karim arrive to defend the Pharaoh. Thief King Bakura pretends to retreat and leads them into a trap, giving him the chance to finally defeat Slifer. Yugi and the others appear just in time, giving the Pharaoh the strength he needs to summon the Winged Dragon of Ra. However, Yami Bakura uses Zorc's immense dark power to turn back time, so he can make sure Yugi never shows up. The Pharaoh is defeated and Thief King Bakura takes the Millennium Puzzle, while the Pharaoh falls into the chasm.
208	24	"In Search of a King"; Transliteration: "The Pharaoh is Alive" (Japanese: 生きていたファラオ)	Yasuyuki Suzuki	June 9, 2004	December 17, 2005
Aknadin forces Kisara to fight the other prisoners in an attempt to force her to call forth her spirit beast. Despite Aknadin urging him not to, Seto steps in to protect Kisara, until she is finally able to summon the Blue-Eyes White Dragon. Meanwhile, Yugi and the gang search for the Pharaoh, who they firmly believe is still alive. During their search, they run into Mana, who decides to help them. They find the Pharaoh taking shelter in a cave, though he is badly injured.
209	25	"Village of Vengeance, Part 1"; Transliteration: "Village of Dead Spirits" (Japanese: 死霊の村)	Akemi Omode	June 16, 2004	January 7, 2006
The priests meet up with the Pharaoh and the others, and together they track Thief King Bakura to Kul Elna, a ruined village haunted by the vengeful spirits of its former citizens. The Pharaoh heads in to face Bakura alone, but is soon joined by the spirit of Mahad, in the form of the Dark Magician. Bakura summons Diabound, newly evolved after its battle with Slifer, to combat him. Mana finally unlocks the great magical power of her spirit beast, the Dark Magician Girl, and rushes to their aid.
210	26	"Village of Vengeance, Part 2"; Transliteration: "The End of Thief King Bakura" (Japanese: 盗賊王バクラの最期)	Shin Yoshida	June 23, 2004	January 14, 2006
Mahad and Mana mount a counterattack on Diabound, but it absorbs the dead spirits of Kul Elna to make itself more powerful. Seto and the rest of the priests arrive but are unable to penetrate Diabound's spirit shield. Bakura takes the Millennium Scale from Karim and uses it to strengthen Diabound by fusing another Shadow Creature (Illushu) with it. Shada locates Diabound's stone tablet and plans to destroy it to eliminate the beast. However, Aknadin attacks him and takes the Millennium Key. Shada is dragged into Diabound's tablet by the spirits of Kul Elna. Diabound's attacks overwhelm the Pharaoh and his Guardians. As Diabound defeats them, the Pharaoh tries to surrender himself to the souls of Kul Elna. The angry spirits enter his body, planning to drag him into the Shadow Realm, but the Pharaoh's father, King Aknamkanon, arrives and intercepts the spirits, convincing them to take his soul instead. Aknamkanon is able to trap the angry spirits within him, which releases Shada from Diabound's tablet, and leads the spirits to the Shadow Realm (trapping himself there as well). Bakura becomes enrages as the loss of the spirits weakens Diabound. Mahad is finally able to defeat Diabound with help from the Pharaoh. As Shada watches, Diabound's tablet breaks into pieces.
211	27	"Village of Vengeance, Part 3"; Transliteration: "A New Stage" (Japanese: 新たなるステージ)	Atsushi Maekawa	June 30, 2004	January 21, 2006
Yugi and the others enter the palace to search for clues about the Pharaoh's real name. Thief King Bakura collapses, but manages to place his three Millennium Items into the Millennium stone. Yami Bakura then releases Thief King Bakura from his control, who is confused about what was happening, unable to recall what he was doing. Then he turns into dust, even as he cries out in anguish for help. Yami Bakura's disembodied spirit tells the others he was merely using Bandit Bakura as a pawn. Later, Aknadin betrays the other priests by using a time-freezing spell to incapacitate them and takes the Millennium Items, giving him the power needed to resurrect the Zorc Necrophades, The Dark One and Lord of Terror Evil and Darkness, from the Millennium Stone. Zorc transforms Aknadin into the Lord of Darkness, The Great Shadow Magus (which doubles Aknadin's power). Yami Bakura reveals the true nature of the Shadow Game — it is simply a board game, played by the present-day versions of Yami Bakura and the Pharaoh (the other parts of their souls). However, their actions dictate the events of the Memory World, which are manipulated by their game pieces.
212	28	"Village of Vengeance, Part 4"; Transliteration: "The Dark High Priest" (Japanese: 闇の大神官)	Yasuyuki Suzuki	July 7, 2004	January 28, 2006
Kaiba arrives in Egypt. Ishizu and Marik lead him to the stone tablet shrine, where the Millennium Eye begins glowing and shows his visions of Bakura and the Pharaoh's Shadow Game. Yami Bakura pulls Kaiba's soul into the game, and uses it to help resurrect the Thief King, and Yami Bakura retakes control of Thief King Bakura. Meanwhile, Bobasa guides Yugi and the others to the Valley of the Kings, where the Pharaoh's true name lies within his future tomb. Then, Bobasa leaves, having fulfilled his duty.
213	29	"Village of Vengeance, Part 5"; Transliteration: "The Countdown to the Evil God Revival" (Japanese: 邪神復活へのカウントダウン)	Akemi Omode	July 14, 2004	February 4, 2006
With All Seven Millennium Items, Thief King Bakura is able to revive Diabound without his tablet and he is stronger than ever, in his 5th and final form. The Millennium Stone then sinks deep into the ground, along with the seven items. Bandit Bakura uses Diabound to allow Aknadin escape, who takes Priest Seto with him. To give Zorc Necrophades enough time to be fully reborn, he separates the Pharaoh and his priests from one another and attacks them with armies of monsters while they are isolated. Karim sacrifices himself, in order to give his remaining power to Shada. Meanwhile, Pharaoh heads back to the palace to find Priest Seto.
214	30	"Name of the Game"; Transliteration: "White Dragon" (Japanese: 白き龍)	Shin Yoshida	July 21, 2004	April 1, 2006
Seto and Kisara face Aknadin, however Kisara is killed while protecting Seto, and the White Dragon is sealed in stone. Meanwhile, Yugi and his friends brave many deadly traps finally find the Pharaoh's true name in a room in the back. The Pharaoh makes it back to the palace, however he is forced to battle against Seto as his mind was being manipulated by the evil Priest Aknadin. The legendary ancient match between the Pharaoh and Priest Seto begins. The Pharaoh summons Mahad, as Dark Magician, to fight against the Blue-Eyes White Dragon, now controlled by Priest Seto. The Pharaoh is eventually overpowered. However, the spirit of Kisara, in the form of the Blue-Eyes White Dragon, enters Seto's mind and destroys Aknadin for good. As a result, Aknadin's soul is sent to the Shadow Realm. However, the time on Yami Bakura's 3rd hourglass runs out, and Zorc Necrophades begins to revive. At the same time, Yami Bakura takes full control of Tristan's body and blocks the only exit of the Pharaoh's tomb. Telling Yugi he will never leave the tomb alive, Yami Bakura challenges Yugi to a duel.
215	31	"The Dark One Cometh, Part 1"; Transliteration: "The Great Evil God Zorc Revives" (Japanese: 大邪神ゾーク復活)	Atsushi Maekawa	July 28, 2004	April 8, 2006
Thief King Bakura succeeds in reviving Zorc Necrophades, sacrificing himself and his Diabound in the process, the two absorbed into the Millennium Stone. As Zorc emerges from underneath Kul Elna, his energy destroys the Millennium Stone, causing the Millennium Items to scatter throughout Kul Elna. The Pharaoh and Priest Seto ride back to the palace and attempt to stop Zorc. Shada intercepts a lightning bolt sent by Zorc meant for the Pharaoh and dies. Meanwhile, events in the Memory World have linked to the Real World. Zorc's revival causes the Real World to be beset by all sorts of natural disasters. Once Yami Bakura gains the Pharaoh's name, he intends to revive Zorc in the Real World. Meanwhile, Yugi and Yami Bakura (possessing the body of Tristan) duel. If Yugi wins, he can leave and tell the Pharaoh his true name, and if he loses, he'll never leave. He and his friends will be swallowed by the Shadow Realm.
216	32	"The Dark One Cometh, Part 2"; Transliteration: "The Legendary Guardian God — Exodia Revives!" (Japanese: 伝説の守護神 エクゾディア復活!)	Akemi Omode	August 4, 2004	April 15, 2006
Isis and Mana head for Kul Elna to retrieve the Millennium Items. Isis uses her Millennium Necklace to strengthen her Winged Guardian of the Fortress to distract Zorc. However, Zorc destroys Isis's dragon and the amount of damage she takes kills her. Once Mana delivers the Millennium Items to Shimon, he summons Exodia with the Millennium Key, which holds its own against Zorc. Zorc eventually overpowers it, since Exodia drew its power from a mortal, Shimon, while Zorc had an almost infinite supply of darkness. Zorc the Dark One then destroys Exodia, killing Shimon. Mana delivers the other Millennium Items to the Pharaoh, who prepares to fight Zorc. The duel between Yugi and Yami Bakura continues, but suddenly, Yami Bakura's voice changes and he calls Yugi a "pathetic mortal", which strikes Téa as strange.
217	33	"The Dark One Cometh, Part 3"; Transliteration: "Summon! The Three Gods" (Japanese: 召喚! 三幻神)	Yasuyuki Suzuki	August 11, 2004	April 22, 2006
The Pharaoh summons the Three Egyptian Gods to combat Zorc. At the tabletop in the Shadow Realm, Yami Bakura claims he'll soon return to his original form, and leaves the table to join with his 5,000-year-old counterpart — Zorc. At the same time, he sends the present-day Pharaoh to the battlefield to reunite his past self. Meanwhile, Zorc defeats the three Egyptian Gods by covering the Sun, the source of their strength. Zorc then turns the Egyptian Gods into motionless statues of stone. Yami Bakura's deck destruction strategy drives Yugi into a corner, but, remembering that the Pharaoh, Joey, and Téa are counting on him, continues the duel and draws the one card that can turn the tables.
218	34	"The Dark One Cometh, Part 4"; Transliteration: "Zorc vs. Blue Eyes Ultimate Dragon" (Japanese: ゾークvs青眼の白龍(ブルーアイズ・ホワイトドラゴン))	Shin Yoshida	August 18, 2004	April 29, 2006
Mana takes the Pharaoh back to the palace while Seto summons Blue-Eyes White Dragon to combat Zorc. Blue-Eyes White Dragon stops the solar eclipse but is defeated by Zorc, which turns Priest Seto and the Millennium Rod to stone. Kaiba takes over and summons Blue-Eyes Ultimate Dragon, which is equal to power of Zorc. The explosive burst of energy their clashing attacks opens a rift from the Memory World to the Real World. Meanwhile, Yugi successfully defeats Yami Bakura with the final card in his deck. Yugi and his friends fly to the Pharaoh. The Pharaoh becomes Black Luster Soldier and fuses with Blue-Eyes Ultimate Dragon, becoming Master of Dragon Knight. However, the Master of Dragon Knight is destroyed by its own attack during the battle and the Pharaoh is seemingly defeated.
219	35	"In the Name of the Pharaoh!"; Transliteration: "In the Name of the Pharaoh!!" (Japanese: 王(ファラオ)の名のもとに!!)	Atsushi Maekawa	August 25, 2004	May 6, 2006
Yugi, Joey, and others summon monsters to help the Pharaoh. The ancient characters of his name cannot be read so they cannot tell the Pharaoh what it is. Tea remembers the cartouche pendant and the group focus on it, causing the characters they saw to materialize on its surface. The Pharaoh reads it, regaining his true name, "Atem". Imbued with this power, he revives the three Egyptian Gods and fuses them together to form the Creator of Light, Horakhty. (Horakhty is a level 12, warrior-type Divine-God attribute monster, with infinite attack and defense points; if successfully summoned during a duel, it results in an instant win.) The Pharaoh attacks Zorc directly with Horakhty's Shining Light, which results in Zorc being destroyed forever. Later, the Pharaoh entrusts the Millennium Items to the revived Priest Seto and makes him the next Pharaoh of Egypt as Aknadin says. With his role in the past over, Atem's body dissolves even as Priest Seto promises to rule Egypt justly. Atem and his friends leave the Memory World.
220	36	"The Final Journey"; Transliteration: "The Final Test" (Japanese: 最後の試練)	Akemi Omode	September 1, 2004	May 13, 2006
Atem and the others return to present-day Egypt, where they are met by Marik, Ishizu, Odion, and even Bakura, who has finally been freed from Zorc's control like Dartz freed from Orichalcos' control and Marik freed from Yami Marik's control and possession. Atem has set his mind to sealing the seven Millennium Items away, along with himself. However, as part of a rite of passage, someone must defeat Atem in a duel to do so. Although Kaiba and Joey both volunteer, Yugi takes the honor. The duel will take place tomorrow and both Pharaoh Atem and Yugi construct their best deck possible.
221	37	"The Final Duel, Part 1"; Transliteration: "The Last Duel of Destiny" (Japanese: 運命のラストデュエル)	Yasuyuki Suzuki	September 8, 2004	May 20, 2006
Yugi and Atem place the seven Millennium Items into their slots in the Millennium Stone (which now appears to be intact). Pharaoh Atem and Yugi then separate into two physical beings. The duel that will determine the fate of Atem and Yugi begins. Pharaoh Atem begins by summoning "The Tricky" with an attack power of 2000 but Yugi plays the magic card, "Swords of Revealing Light". Yugi is able to fuse the three monsters: "Green Gadget", "Red Gadget", and "Yellow Gadget" into one monster with 3000 attack points: the "Mobile Fortress Stronghold". However, after successfully summoning "Obelisk, the Tormentor" on his next turn, Pharaoh Atem defeats Yugi's "Mobile Fortress Stronghold". Although Yugi is able to dodge Obelisk's next attack against his "Silent Swordsman", Pharaoh Atem retaliates by summoning both "Slifer, the Sky-Dragon" and "The Winged Dragon of Ra" (also demonstrating that Atem knows the ancient chant required to summon Ra) in the same turn, giving him all three Egyptian Gods on the field at the same time.
222	38	"The Final Duel, Part 2"; Transliteration: "Defeat the Three Gods" (Japanese: 三幻神を倒せ!)	Shin Yoshida	September 15, 2004	May 27, 2006
The duel between Yugi and Atem continues. The sum of the attack power of Atem's three Egyptian Gods exceeds ten thousand. Yugi is overwhelmed, but successfully summons one of his most powerful monsters, "Valkyrion The Magna Warrior", by discarding the three smaller Magna Warriors — Alpha, Beta and Gamma — to the graveyard, and he then parries Slifer's Summon Thunder Bullet with a Quick Spell card, "Mirage Magic". When a player's monsters' Attack Power and Defense Power increases or decreases due to an opponent's card effect, "Mirage Magic" negates the effect and recovers the difference in Life Points. Furthermore, Yugi also dodges the attacks of all three Egyptian Gods with the Trap card "Mirage Ruler", forcing Atem to end his turn. Yugi finally makes a counterattack move that threatens the Egyptian Gods. He summons the three smaller Magna Warriors — Alpha, Beta and Gamma — from the graveyard in return for sacrificing "Valkyrion The Magna Warrior", and then activates the Trap Card, "Magnet Force", which transfers the effect of Silfer's Summon Thunder Bullet onto the Egyptian Gods themselves. However, when he launches an attack with "Silent Swordsman", Atem activates his facedown Trap Card, "Mirror Force", destroying every monster Yugi had on the field, seemingly leaving him in an unassailable position.
223	39	"The Final Duel, Part 3"; Transliteration: "Strong Heart — Tender Heart" (Japanese: 強き心 優しき心)	Shin Yoshida	September 22, 2004	June 3, 2006
Yugi uses the last card in his hand, "Magnet Reverse", allowing him to summon "Valkyrion The Magna Warrior" back from the graveyard. With "Magnet Force" still in play, Yugi uses Slifer's Summon Thunder Bullet to destroy Obelisk. Moreover, using Valkyrion's special ability, Yugi sacrifices it to summon the three smaller Magna Warriors — Alpha, Beta and Gamma — back to the field, and Slifer's three Summon Thunder Bullets are redirected to both Slifer and Ra, destroying them both. Having successfully defeated the Egyptian Gods, Kaiba himself finally admits that he was wrong about Yugi, and pronounces him as "The King of Games", as he did not believe defeating all three Egyptian Gods simultaneously was possible. However, Atem is not worried at all, admitting that he knew that Yugi would defeat the Egyptian Gods. Atem and Yugi trade blows with "Chimera The Flying Mythical Beast" and "Buster Blader" respectfully, before Atem summons "Swift Gaia The Fierce Knight", whom he discarded to the graveyard on his very first move of the game, and uses it to destroy "Buster Blader". Yugi responds by summoning "Summoned Skull" and "Curse of Dragon", but Atem demonstrates his power to control his deck at will, and summons "Big Shield Gardna" to defend himself, albeit temporarily. In a final act of defiance, Atem gives up half his remaining Life Points to play "Dark Magic Curtain", thus allowing him to summon his most trusted creature, the "Dark Magician". (Note: When this aired in the U.S., the ending said "To Be Concluded" instead of "To Be Continued", thus signifying the end of the series.)
224	40	"The Final Duel, Part 4"; Transliteration: "The Story That Concludes in Light" (Japanese: 光の中へ完結する物語)	Shin Yoshida	September 29, 2004	June 10, 2006
Yugi tries his best to fend off the attacks from Atem's most faithful servant, the "Dark Magician", but he is left with just 400 Life Points remaining. Yugi then plays a Spell Card, "Gold Sarcophagus", which allows Yugi to choose any magic card from his deck and store it in the chest; if Atem ever uses the same card himself, then Yugi can negate the activation of that card. Yugi tries to use "Gandora The Dragon of Destruction" to defeat the "Dark Magician", just how he was able to defeat Yami Bakura, but to no avail. Atem summons his "Dark Magician Girl" to support his "Dark Magician" in response to Yugi summoning his "Silent Magician". Yugi forces Atem to sacrifice both of his magicians to protect his Life Points after Yugi uses "Card of Sanctity" to increase the strength of his "Silent Magician". Atem then tries to activate the Spell Card, "Monster Reborn", so he can revive "Slifer the Sky Dragon", but at that moment, Yugi opens the Gold Sarcophagus to reveal the card he sealed away. The card was "Monster Reborn", meaning that neither of them can use that card in this game. It is Yugi's message to the Pharaoh that "Those of the dead should not remain in the world of the living". With the activation of "Monster Reborn" negated, and Slifer the Sky Dragon sent back to the graveyard, Atem is left defenceless. Yugi finally defeats him, but immediately collapses on his knees in tears, distraught at the realisation he will never see Atem again. Despite Atem telling Yugi that he shouldn't cry, Yugi tells Atem that he (Yugi) is weak, and that Atem's strength and bravery was always his goal. Atem comforts Yugi, saying that he displayed true courage in even deciding to duel Atem in the first place, and that he had a power that no-one else could conquer: that of kindness. Yugi's victory has finally set him free. Atem then departs into the afterlife. Then, the Millennium Stone shatters, which causes the seven Millennium Items to fall into the pit left behind. Also, the shrine collapses, and Shadi's spirit is seen here one last time. Everybody barely makes it out in time. As a result of the shrine's destruction, the Millennium Items are buried forever. Yugi tells Joey that, "Sometimes, the end of one adventure is only beginning of another." This concludes the end of the 4-Kids version of the story. In the extended ending (only in the original Japanese version), Yugi, Tea, Joey, Tristan, Bakura, Duke, Grandpa, Kaiba and Mokuba all leave Egypt and return to Domino City of Japan. In the airport, they meet up with Rebecca, Arthur, and Serenity. Both Duke and Tristan run towards Serenity, only to be pulled back by Joey. Rebecca hugs Yugi, much to Tea's annoyance. Weevil Underwood and Rex Raptor get into an argument again and decide to duel. Zigfried and Leon von Schroeder make a business proposition with Pegasus, to which he agrees. Mako Tsunami returns from a fishing trip, and he meets Espa and the Roba brothers at the harbor. Espa Roba starts his duel disc indicating that duel is about to take place. Mai Valentine and Vivian Wong are facing off in a two-on-two duel against the Paradox Brothers atop the Great Wall of China. The credits end with a cutscene where Grandpa is sweeping, while Yugi comes out from the house to join Tea, Joey, and Tristan to go to school. Yugi ends the episode and the show by saying that his story has not ended, and that his story extends beyond that of the Pharaoh, who after 3,000 years defeated the evil Zorc Necrophades.
