= Child's Play (Abdullah novel) =

2009 novel by Kia Abdullah

- First edition
- Author: Kia Abdullah
- Language: English
- Genre: Novel
- Publisher: Revenge Ink
- Publication date: 4 December 2009
- Publication place: United Kingdom
- Media type: Print (paperback)
- ISBN: 978-0-9558078-5-5
- OCLC: 435732737

Child's Play is a 2009 novel by the British author Kia Abdullah.

== Plot ==
A psychological crime thriller, Child's Play follows the story of 25-year-old Allegra Ashe who, after a chance encounter with an alluring stranger, is recruited into 'Vokoban', a covert government unit that uses a mysterious new law to chase and convict paedophiles. Allegra becomes deeply involved with the unit and so begins her descent into the darkness and depravity of the human mind. As her life spirals out of control, the reader becomes a voyeur in a world of lust, danger, deceit and revenge.

The plot explores certain controversial themes such as rape and paedophilia. Having faced a degree of controversy over her first novel, Life, Love and Assimilation, Abdullah is unsure how her second novel will be received: "It's ultra violent and ultra sexual, and there are some morally ambiguous sex scenes in there, so I don't know how people will react to that," she says on her website.

She adds:

Child's Play is loosely based around paedophilia and sexually deviant habits. It has a few harrowing scenes, but they're not there for shock value. They raise some interesting questions: what is the root of sexually deviant habits? Is it nature or nurture, and if it's nature, to what extent can we blame those who practice those habits? The book also examines the psyche behind female sexuality and discusses certain discomforting phenomena like rape fantasies for example. All of this is wrapped up in a good bonafide thriller that is genuinely absorbing so it's up to the reader how deeply they want to look at the underlying themes.

In 2011 the Telegraph commented that her two controversial novels, Life Love and Assimilation and Child’s Play drew condemnation from the British Bangladeshi community.
