= 2016 Philippine presidential election =

- May 9, 2016
- Turnout: 80.69% (▲6.35pp)
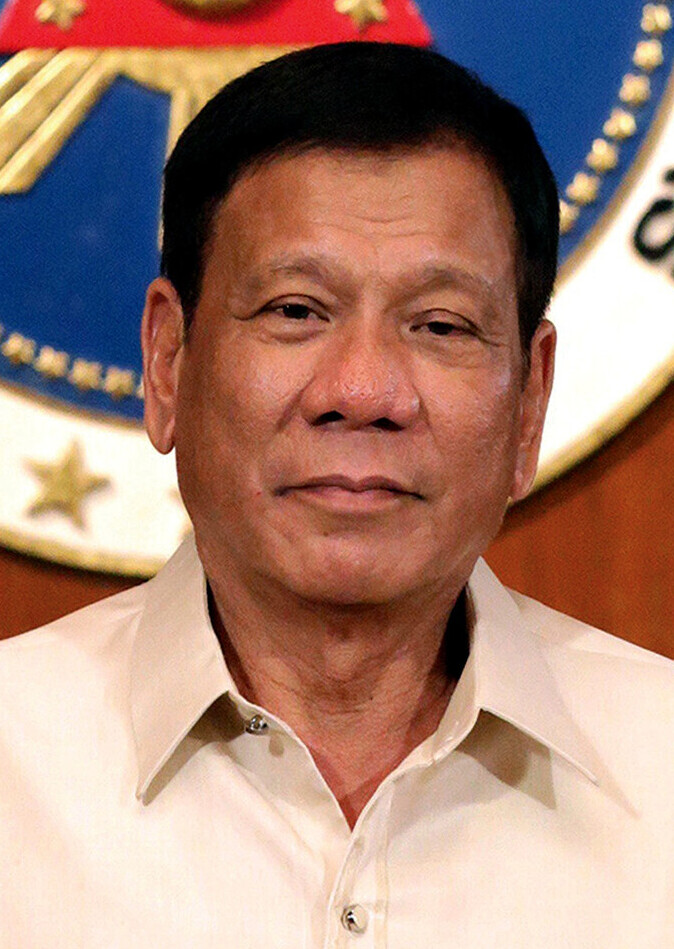

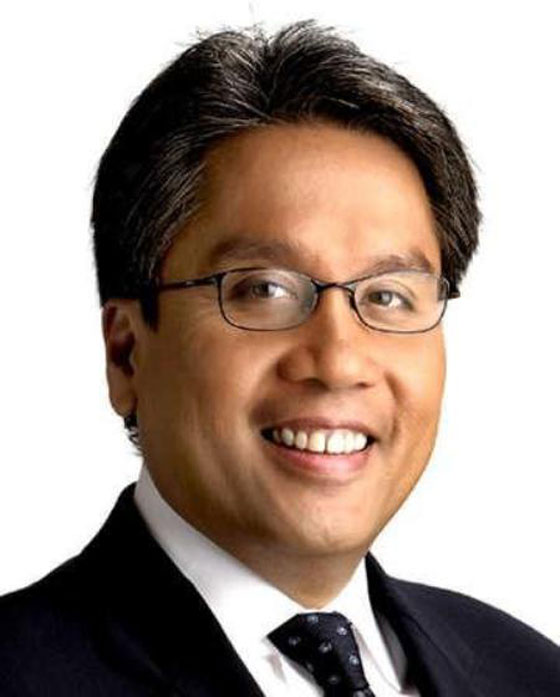

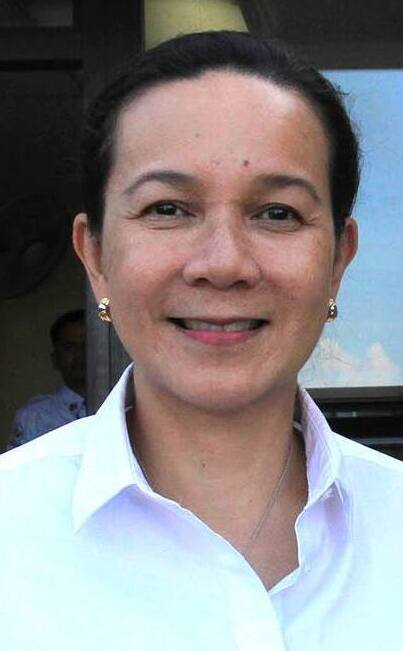

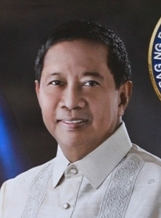
Candidate	Rodrigo Duterte	Mar Roxas
Party	PDP–Laban	Liberal
Alliance		Daang Matuwid
Running mate	Alan Peter Cayetano	Leni Robredo
Popular vote	16,601,997	9,978,175
Percentage	39.01%	23.45%
Candidate	Grace Poe	Jejomar Binay
Party	Independent	UNA
Alliance	PGP
Running mate	Francis Escudero	Gregorio Honasan
Popular vote	9,100,991	5,416,140
Percentage	21.39%	12.73%
- Map showing the official results taken from provincial and city certificates of canvass. The inset shows Metro Manila.
President before election
Benigno Aquino III
Liberal
Elected President
Rodrigo Duterte
PDP–Laban
- 2016 Philippine vice presidential election
- May 9, 2016
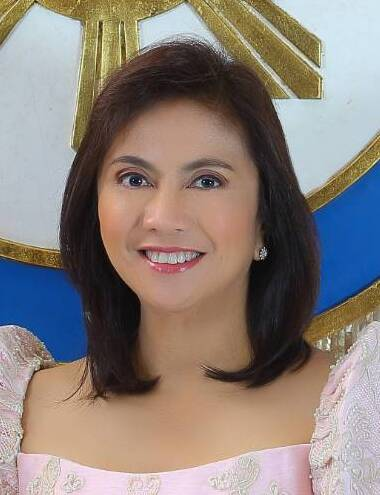

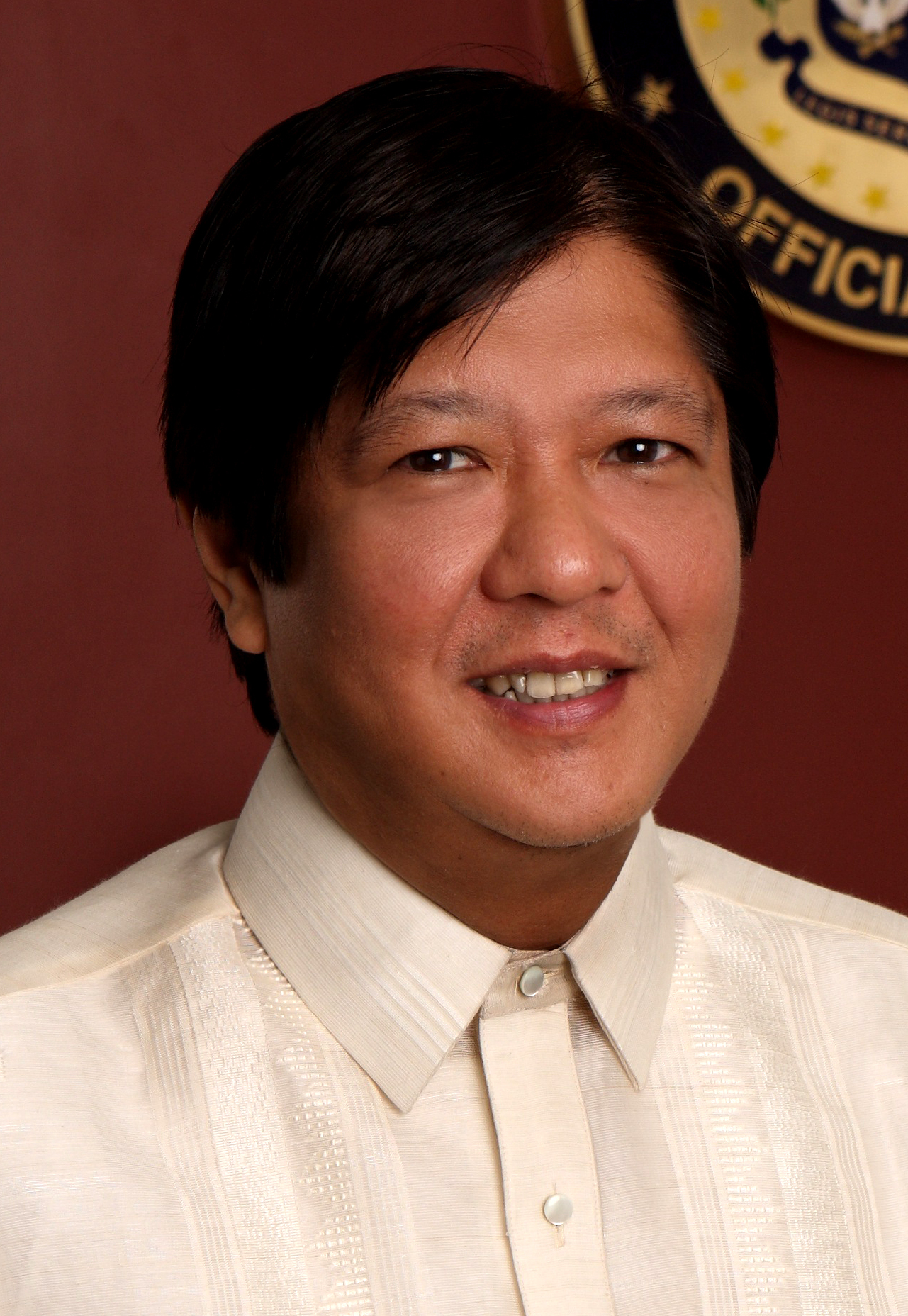

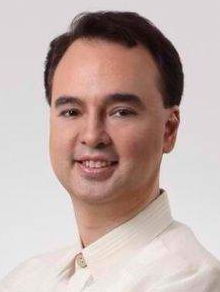

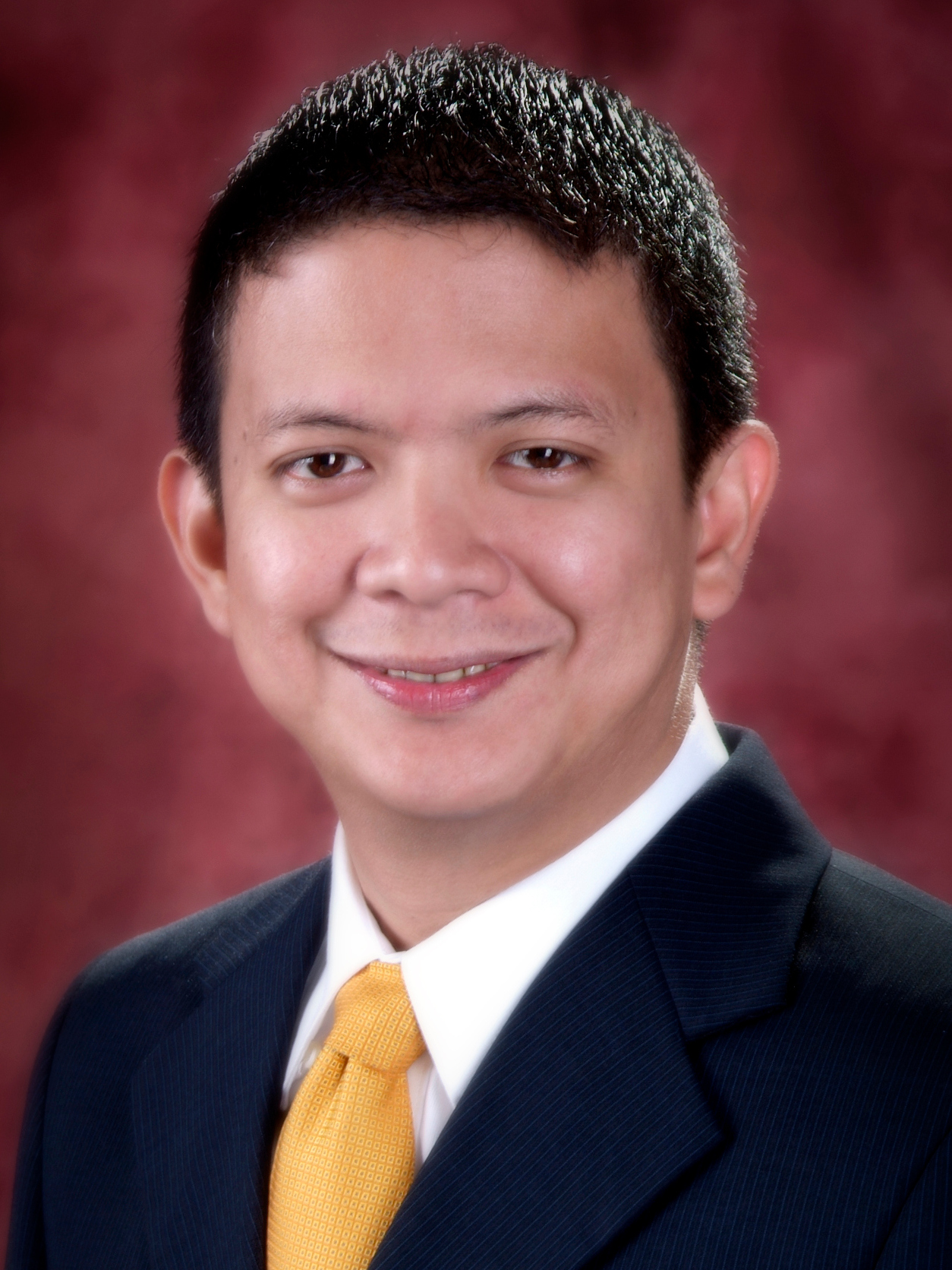
Candidate	Leni Robredo	Bongbong Marcos
Party	Liberal	Independent
Alliance	Daang Matuwid
Popular vote	14,418,817	14,155,344
Percentage	35.11%	34.77%
Candidate	Alan Peter Cayetano	Francis Escudero
Party	Independent	Independent
Alliance		PGP
Popular vote	5,903,379	4,931,962
Percentage	14.38%	12.01%
- Map showing the official results taken from provincial and city certificates of canvass. The inset shows Metro Manila.
Vice President before election
Jejomar Binay
UNA
Elected Vice President
Leni Robredo
Liberal

Presidential elections in the Philippines were held on May 9, 2016, as part of the 2016 general election. This was the 16th direct presidential election in the country since 1935 and the fifth sextennial presidential election since 1992.

Incumbent president Benigno Aquino III was ineligible for re-election, pursuant to the 1987 Philippine Constitution. Incumbent vice president Jejomar Binay was eligible for re-election but chose to run for the presidency instead. Therefore, this election determined the 16th president and the 14th vice president. The position of president and vice president are elected separately, thus the two winning candidates could come from different political parties.

Rodrigo Duterte was elected President of the Philippines with 38.5% of the vote. Congress met in late May to canvass the results and issued an official result with Duterte and Leni Robredo emerging as the winners of the presidential and vice presidential races, respectively. They were proclaimed on May 30 in the House of Representatives.

On the other hand, Robredo narrowly won the vice presidential election over Bongbong Marcos, son of former president Ferdinand Marcos. Bongbong Marcos filed an electoral protest through the Presidential Electoral Tribunal, but was later dismissed in 2021.

== Electoral system ==
According to the Constitution of the Philippines, the election is held every six years after 1992, on the second Monday of May. The incumbent president is term limited. The incumbent vice president may run for two consecutive terms. The plurality voting system is used to determine the winner: the candidate with the highest number of votes, whether or not one has a majority, wins the presidency. The vice presidential election is a separate election, is held on the same rules, and voters may split their ticket. Both winners will serve six-year terms commencing on the noon of June 30, 2016, and ending on the same day six years later.

== Background ==
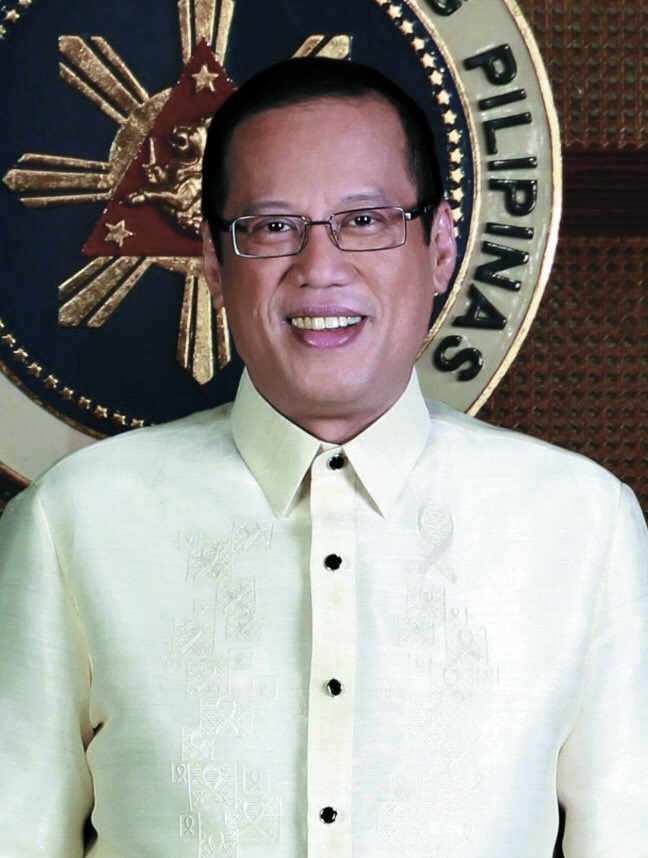
Benigno Aquino III, the outgoing president, whose term expired on June 30, 2016

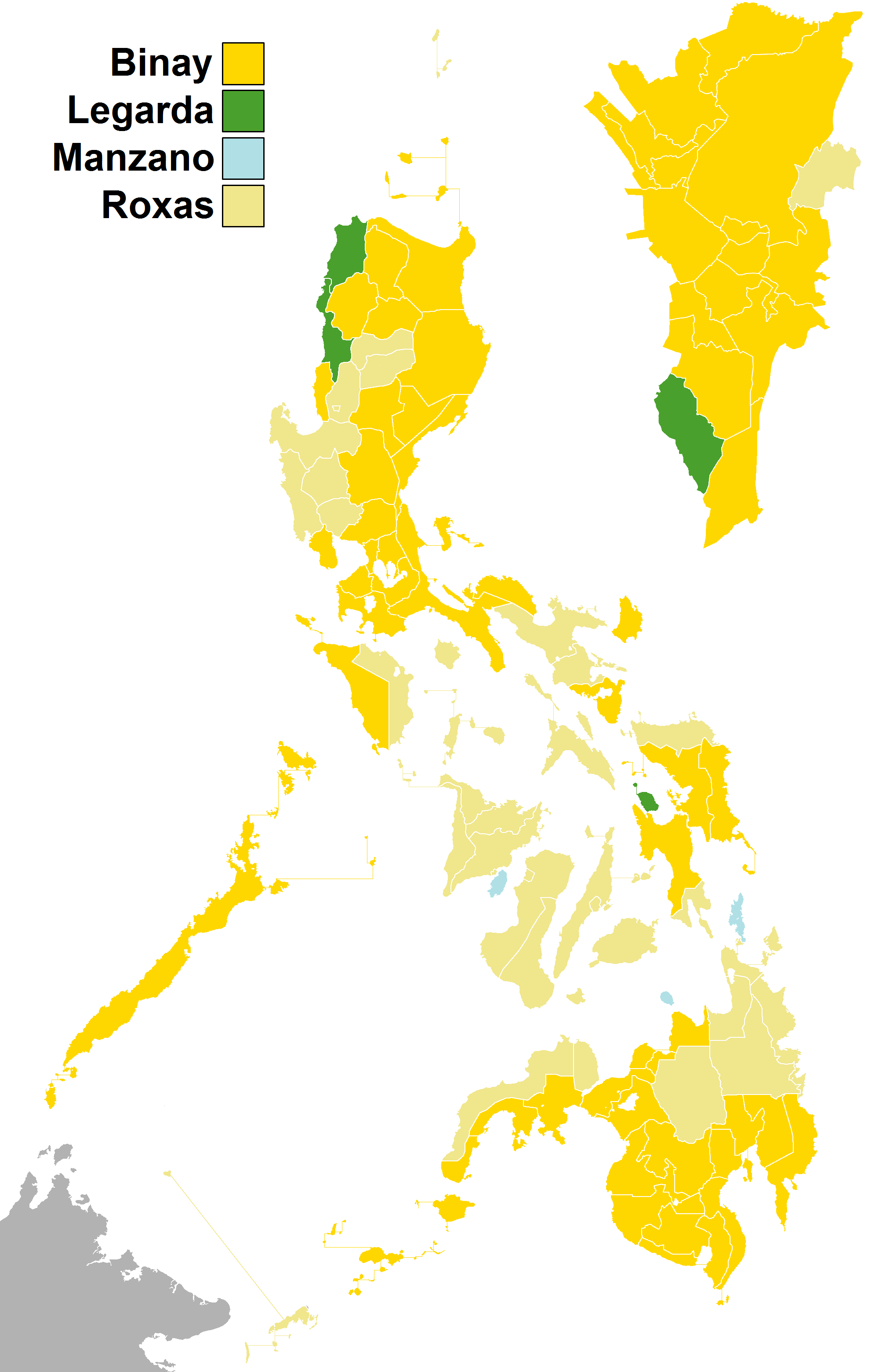
Map of the results of the 2010 vice presidential election.

Senator Benigno Aquino III of the Liberal Party, who ran on an anti-corruption platform, won the 2010 election with 42.08% of the votes defeating Joseph Estrada, a former president who was deposed in 2001 after scandals of massive corruption, and several others. Meanwhile, Estrada's running mate, Makati Mayor Jejomar Binay of the Partido Demokratiko Pilipino-Lakas ng Bayan (PDP–Laban), defeated Aquino's running mate, Senator Mar Roxas of the Liberal Party and several others, in the vice presidential election. Roxas eventually accused Binay of electoral fraud in the Presidential Electoral Tribunal, citing that some of his votes were recorded as null votes.

Both Binay and Roxas were subsequently appointed by Aquino to his cabinet, with Binay heading the Housing and Urban Development Coordinating Council, and Roxas first being given the Transportation and Communications portfolio, then finally named as Secretary of the Interior and Local Government, after the ban of appointing losing candidates expired a year after Aquino took office on June 30, 2010. As of 2014, the tribunal had still not yet acted upon the preliminary motions of both parties and on Binay's counter-protest; the suit is expected to still not have been resolved by the time President Aquino's term expires.

For the midterm 2013 Senate election, Aquino and Roxas formed the Team PNoy coalition; Estrada's PMP and Binay's PDP–Laban forged an electoral alliance, the United Nationalist Alliance (UNA). Team PNoy won nine Senate seats against UNA's three. Former Movie and Television Review and Classification Board chairwoman Grace Poe, daughter of defeated 2004 presidential candidate Fernando Poe Jr. topped the senatorial election.

In March 2014, PDP–Laban withdrew from UNA, a week after Binay resigned as party chairman, due "to differences with its leaders". Party president Aquilino Pimentel III had a public quarrel with Binay over Migz Zubiri's inclusion in UNA's 2013 senatorial slate, whom Pimentel had accused of cheating in the 2007 Senate election. In Pulse Asia survey released in April 2014, the first opinion poll for the presidential election, it showed Binay leading aspiring candidates, with 40% of those surveyed with Grace Poe a far second at 15%.

Several other stalwarts of UNA, such as senators Juan Ponce Enrile and Jinggoy Estrada, who had manifested his intention to run as Binay's running mate, and others such as Senator Bong Revilla of Lakas–CMD, who was planning to run for president, were detained due to their involvement in the pork barrel scam. No personalities linked with the Liberal Party involved in the scam were investigated. These actions by the government, which it said was part of its anti-corruption drive, were cited by UNA as "political persecution".

In July 2014, Renato Bondal, a defeated mayoral candidate in the 2013 Makati mayoral election, filed plunder cases against Makati mayor Jejomar Binay, Jr. and his father, the vice president, to the Ombudsman. By the next month, a subcommittee of the Blue Ribbon Committee composed solely of Pimentel, along with Nacionalista Party members Alan Peter Cayetano and Antonio Trillanes IV, began Senate hearings against Binay on his alleged corruption while serving as mayor of Makati, beginning with the alleged overpriced annex building of the Makati City Hall. It was followed by hearings on alleged corruption on deals supplying Makati senior citizens with birthday cakes, an agricultural estate in Rosario, Batangas that Binay allegedly owns, the allegedly overpriced Makati Science High School, and the relocation of Makati residents to Calauan, Laguna in a community without basic necessities.

Makati City Hall (taller building to the right) as viewed from the Pasig River; the allegedly overpriced annex is the building to the left.

Binay had consistently denied any wrongdoing, and from owning the Rosario estate, but had never appeared at the Senate. UNA Secretary General JV Bautista branded the investigations as part of the "Operation Plan Stop Nognog", insinuating on Binay's dark skin, with Roxas, Cayetano and Trillanes allegedly behind it to prevent Binay from becoming president. He accused billionaire businessman Salvador Zamora as its financier. In May 2015, the Court of Appeals ordered the 242 bank accounts belonging to Binay to be frozen for six months, when it granted the petition of the Anti-Money Laundering Council and of the Ombudsman. Binay's camp had alleged certain people from the Liberal Party to be behind the freeze order, a charge President Aquino, in a Bombo Radyo interview, himself denied.

By late May 2015, the subcommittee report recommending the filing of a plunder (corruption worth more than 50 million pesos) complaint against Binay was signed by all three subcommittee members and Grace Poe. By early June, ten senators had already signed the subcommittee report, making it official and available to be debated upon in the Senate floor. A Pulse Asia presidential survey taken at the time the hearings were done showed Grace Poe overtaking Binay, with her getting 30% of the respondents, over Binay's 22%. A month later, Binay sued Cayetano, Trillanes and several others for 200 million pesos in damages at the Makati Regional Trial Court for "well-organized and orchestrated effort" to damage his reputation and worsen his chances of becoming president.

Meanwhile, Aquino held several meetings with Roxas, Poe and Francis Escudero on who should be the standard bearer of the Liberal Party. While none of them had announced their preferences at that time, Aquino was expected to announce his preferred candidate after his final State of the Nation Address late in July. Congressional heads Franklin Drilon and Feliciano Belmonte, Jr. denied that Liberal Party members had been dissatisfied with Aquino's indecision, saying that the party was still united.

On early July, Binay launched his party, the United Nationalist Alliance. Later that month, Aquino endorsed Roxas for president, which the latter accepted. In August, Rodrigo Duterte, the Davao City mayor who had been a subject of a strong online following urging him to run, announced his intention to retire from politics after his mayoral term ends in 2016. Poe announced her intention to seek the presidency by mid-September, followed by Escudero's announcing that he'll be her running mate a day later. Several days later, Cayetano announced his vice presidential candidacy, preferring to be Duterte's running mate.

On October 3. Trillanes formally announced his vice presidential campaign as an independent, supporting Poe's presidential campaign. Days later, Leni Robredo, the representative from Camarines Sur and widow of former Secretary of the Interior and Local Government Jesse Robredo who died in a plane crash in 2012, accepted the offer of the Liberal Party to be Roxas' running mate. Also on that day, Senator Bongbong Marcos announced his candidacy as vice president. A week later, after being nominated by UNA, Senator Gregorio Honasan announced that he would be Binay's running mate. A day later, on the launch of her new book, Senator Miriam Defensor Santiago announced her presidential candidacy; a couple of days later, she announced that Marcos would be her running mate.

At the final day of the filing of candidacies, Duterte did not show up; instead, the PDP–Laban nominated Martin Diño, chairman of the Volunteers Against Crime and Corruption. At the end of the day, more than a hundred people registered as presidential candidates, after a 5-day long filing period. These include current OFW Family Club representative Roy Señeres running under the Partido ng Manggagawa at Magsasaka, former representative from Iloilo Augusto Syjuco, who is running as an independent, and Engineer Juanita Mendoza Trocenio under the Partido Bagong Maharlika (PBM). For the vice presidency, nineteen people manifested their intention to run, including former assemblyman from Ifugao Zosimo Jesus Paredes II, who is also running under the Partido Bagong Maharlika.

AC Nielsen Philippines showed on its monitoring report between Jan 1 and Nov 30 that presidential candidate Binay spent 595 million pesos for campaign advertisements on television (before the campaign period). Vice presidential candidate Cayetano led the spenders in the race, spending 398 million pesos worth of TV advertisements. Binay, denied the claim. An article from The Manila Times reported also that the administration's bet, Mar Roxas, led the list of the biggest ad spenders in the country with 774 million peso in television advertisement expenses from January to December, in a survey also conducted by AC Nielsen.

== Candidates ==
Under the Constitution of the Philippines, the President and Vice President are elected separately. An initial list of eight presidential candidates were uploaded on the certified candidates list in the commission's database on January 21, 2016. But only trimmed down to five, due to the declaration by the commission en banc of Dante Valencia as a nuisance candidate and the withdrawal of certificates of candidacies of Romel Mendoza and Roy Señeres.

This is the final and certified list of candidates for the elections to be included in the ballots: Jejomar Binay, Miriam Defensor Santiago, Rodrigo Duterte, Grace Poe, and Mar Roxas. Although Señeres withdrew his candidacy and later died, his name was still included on the printed ballots.

Presidential candidate		Vice presidential candidate		Campaign
Candidate name and party	Position	Candidate name and party	Position	Campaign
Jejomar Binay; UNA	Vice President	Gregorio Honasan; UNA	Senator	(campaign)
Miriam Defensor Santiago; PRP	Senator	Bongbong Marcos; Independent (Note: Cayetano, Marcos and Trillanes are all members of the Nacionalista Party, but failed to get that party's nomination; instead, all of them ran as independents.)	Senator	(campaign)
Rodrigo Duterte; PDP–Laban	Mayor of Davao City	Alan Peter Cayetano; Independent	Senator	(campaign)
Grace Poe; Independent	Senator	Francis Escudero; Independent	Senator	(campaign)
Mar Roxas; Liberal	Former secretary of the Interior and Local Government	Leni Robredo; Liberal	House representative from Camarines Sur's 3rd district	(campaign)
None		Antonio Trillanes; Independent	Senator	

=== Jejomar Binay (UNA) ===
When questioned by the media at the Coconut Palace in September 2011, Vice President Jejomar Binay (PDP–Laban) confirmed his plans of running as president.

By May 2014, Binay began his search for a running mate. As his potential running mate Senator Jinggoy Estrada was in jail due to his implication in the PDAF scam, Binay's offers were declined by JV Ejercito, Manny Villar (via wife Cynthia Villar), Vilma Santos (via husband Ralph Recto), Mar Roxas, Grace Poe, Rodrigo Duterte and Joseph Estrada. Binay's daughter Abigail, also the Representative from Makati, said that Binay would accept anyone as his running mate except for Antonio Trillanes, and that she preferred Grace Poe, however Sen. Bongbong Marcos was the most preferred by UNA officials to be his running mate. On June 12, Independence Day, speech in Iloilo, President Aquino said that he could only offer Binay the conduct of a clean and honest election, but not an outright endorsement.

On June 22, Binay resigned from the Aquino cabinet, both as presidential adviser on Overseas Filipino Workers' concerns and as chairman of the Housing and Urban Development Coordinating Council, but did not say why. Two days later, Binay addressed the public from his Coconut Palace office, branding the current administration as "manhid at palpak" (insensitive and bumbling), but did not mention Aquino by name. His running mate was confirmed to be Gregorio Honasan.

==== Gringo Honasan (UNA) ====
Senator Gregorio Honasan (United Nationalist Alliance) denied that he was going to be Jejomar Binay's running mate in September 2015. By the next month, however, he said that his team-up with Binay was possible. On October 12, 2015, Honasan announced that he will be running with Binay as the latter's vice president.

=== Miriam Defensor Santiago (PRP) ===
In a press conference on July 2, 2014, Senator Miriam Defensor Santiago (People's Reform Party) revealed that she was suffering from stage 4 lung cancer and she might run as president for the third time if it goes into remission. Called "the Iron Lady of Asia" and a recipient of the Ramon Magsaysay Award, she was the widely expected winner of the 1992 election, but lost after an inexplicably unscheduled power outage during the counting of votes. She then ran for a Senate seat in 1995 and won. She became one of the most popular senators since then, owing to her broad media visibility as well as to the high number of laws and bills she authored, a record that stands up to this day. She once again ran for president in 1998, but lost, citing black propaganda against her during the campaign.

By November 2014, Santiago, in a tweet, announced that "In the 2016 presidential elections, when I am rid of my lung cancer, I intend to claim the presidency I won in 1992." In a letter to the Senate, Santiago said that more than 90% of the cancer cells have regressed.

Santiago announced her candidacy for president in the launch of her book "Stupid is Forever" on October 13, 2015. She ran under the People's Reform Party, the same party in which she ran under during her 1992 and 1998 presidential campaigns. Days later, Santiago announced that Senator Bongbong Marcos would be her vice presidential running mate, a decision that largely earned criticism from progressives as Marcos is the son of the former president and dictator Ferdinand Marcos. Her platform stood on the effective and efficient upholding and implementation of national and state-recognized international laws, enhancement of the agriculture industry with a focus on irrigation and farm-to-market roads, enhancing all seaports and airports in the country, creating at least one major government project in all provinces and all regions in the Philippines, building and highlighting the country's diplomatic affairs in the international level while skyrocketing the country's defense capabilities, and eradicating graft and corruption, which she believes to be the cause of poverty and inefficiency in the country. Presidential candidate Rodrigo Duterte gave in an interview in November 2015 his comments on his fellow candidates' qualities, stating that "[i]f you want extraordinary competence and integrity, vote for Miriam."

==== Bongbong Marcos (Independent) ====
Asked on a November 2012 interview at DZBB on his plans to run in 2016, Senator Bongbong Marcos (Nacionalista Party) said "never say never." By March 2015, in another interview, this time at DZMM, he said that he "will thoroughly study everything." In August 2015, after reports surfaced of him being Jejomar Binay's running mate, Marcos clarified on an interview at the ABS-CBN News Channel that he is still undecided on what position to run for, but he would certainly not be defending his Senate seat. On October 5, 2015, Senator Bongbong Marcos announced his candidacy for vice president in the 2016 election, and would support the candidacy of Rodrigo Duterte if he ever does run. Days later, Duterte declined Cayetano's and Marcos' offers to be their presidential running mate.

=== Rodrigo Duterte (PDP–Laban) ===
Early in 2015, Davao City Mayor Rodrigo Duterte made hints to the media of his intent to run for the presidency come 2016, with a widely praised promise of abolishing Congress altogether in favor of a Parliament should he win. Earlier, in February 2014, Duterte was reportedly enjoying the support of several netizens lauding his performance as mayor of Davao City, especially in maintaining peace and order in the city, but he was quick to shrug off calls for him to run for president, saying he was not qualified for a higher public office. A year later, Duterte said in a Baguio federalism forum that he'll only run for president "if (it is) to save the republic." Duterte cited the need of about 10 to 15 billion pesos for a campaign war chest as what was keeping him from running. Days later, however, Duterte "re-entered" PDP–Laban; he maintained he never left the party, and only had to stand under a local party banner (Hugpong) in the 2013 local election in order to ensure his victory. PDP–Laban president Aquilino Pimentel III later said that Duterte was among his party's options for a presidential candidate for 2016, noting that the party's position on federalism coincides with Duterte's advocacy. A few days after reports came out saying incumbent Vice President Jejomar Binay (a presidential aspirant) was eyeing Duterte as his possible running mate, Duterte issued a statement saying he was not interested in running for a national post.

In September 2014, Duterte already declined presidential aspirant and incumbent senator Miriam Defensor-Santiago's offer to be her running mate, saying that instead of picking him as the senator's running mate, she could ask former defense secretary Gilberto Teodoro, Jr. instead. However, in October 2015, Santiago chose Bongbong Marcos as her running mate.

Later, during the June 21, 2015 airing of his weekly program in a local channel (Gikan Sa Masa, Para Sa Masa), Duterte stated that he was considering suggestions from his friends and supporters to run for president. He also added that he will stop expressing non-interest in starting a presidential campaign.

On September 7, 2015, in a press conference held at Davao City, Duterte officially declared he will not be running for president in 2016 and apologized to all of his supporters on the decision. He additionally stated that he might retire from politics after his term as mayor of Davao City ends in 2016 and his daughter runs for the office. Other factors he states of his possible retirement included age, health concerns and his family's objections. Mixed reactions erupted in social media hours after the declaration and several supporters still continued to petition online, urging the mayor to revert his decision.

On September 26, 2015, a large number of supporters gathered at the Quirino Grandstand in Rizal Park, Manila to urge Duterte to officially run for the presidency in 2016. Despite being an undeclared candidate, Pulse Asia Research Director Ana Tabunda still considered Duterte "a serious contender" as he was already ranked 4th in a presidential survey done by Pulse Asia from late August to early September, as well as in a Social Weather Stations survey. Duterte's long-time political rival and critic, former House Speaker Prospero Nograles, also expressed his support for Duterte if ever the latter decided to run for the presidency. On September 29, incumbent Senator Alan Peter Cayetano declared his intention to run for the 2016 vice presidential post in a press event held in Davao City and considered Duterte his first choice as running mate for the presidential post; this eventually led to a meeting between the two parties. A day after meeting with Cayetano, Duterte met with another incumbent senator, Bongbong Marcos, who also went to Davao City to personally talk to Duterte. Marcos was reportedly considering running for the vice presidential post as well; Marcos had not yet made any formal proclamation at that time. As with the Cayetano meeting, Duterte still declared that he was not running for president.

On October 13, 2015, in a press conference held at a local hotel in Davao City, Duterte finalized his decision not to run for the presidency, with daughter Sara's objection being pointed out as one of the main contributors.

On October 15, 2015, Duterte, through a representative, filed his candidacy for Mayor of Davao City at the local elections office. A day later, Duterte's daughter Sara, posted on her Instagram account a photo of her candidacy as mayor of Davao City, while hinting that her father would seek a higher post and withdraw his mayoral re-election bid. However, it was not received by the commission in Davao City. Duterte's possibility of substitution until December 10 was opened after Martin Diño, father of celebrity Liza Diño, chairman of Volunteers Against Crime and Corruption, and former barangay captain of Brgy. San Antonio, Quezon City, filed his candidacy for president on the last minute. Diño is a member of PDP–Laban, the same party advocating the federalism system where Duterte belongs. Diño clarified that there was a "clerical error" on his submitted candidacy (running for Pasay mayor, instead of president). On their general meeting held in Pasay on October 26, members of PDP–Laban had expressed their support to Diño in his presidential bid. On October 21, Duterte told CNN Philippines' News.PH interview that there was still a chance he would change his mind. The decision, however, would have to be made by the PDP–Laban.

On October 27, PDP–Laban confirmed that Duterte will substitute as the party's presidential bet if Diño withdraws or is disqualified by the Commission of Elections. Two days later, Diño withdrew his presidential bid and named Duterte as his substitute because of a possibility that Diño might be declared as a nuisance candidate by the commission.

On November 21, in a gathering held in his alma mater San Beda College, Duterte formally announced his presidential bid and also finally accepted Alan Peter Cayetano's offer to be his running mate. Duterte said he was disappointed over the decision made by the Senate Electoral Tribunal regarding Grace Poe's citizenship as well as the current administration's handling of the 'laglag-bala' issue. Duterte further stated that he will file his candidacy immediately after he reached out to his party. However, the legality of Duterte's substitution for Diño was questioned by some electoral lawyers because of an error made in Diño's certificate of candidacy that made him a Pasay mayoral bet despite being a resident of Quezon City.

Duterte topped all other candidates, including former front-runner Grace Poe, in a survey published November 25, 2015, and held by Pulse Asia. Poe said that the survey was 'inconclusive' and 'not reflective' and claimed it was made by Duterte's camp. The day after, Duterte filed his certificate of candidacy at the commission main office in Manila and withdrew his bid for Mayor of Davao City (for which he was substituted by his daughter, Sara).

==== Alan Peter Cayetano (Independent) ====
In a March 2013 interview with the ABS-CBN News Channel, Senator Alan Peter Cayetano (Nacionalista Party), said that "I want to be president of this country." In September 2015, after several surveys saw him trailing in the presidential race, said that he is withdrawing from the presidential election, and would instead focus for the vice presidency, preferably as the running mate of either Mar Roxas or Rodrigo Duterte.

A few days later in a Davao City meeting, Cayetano announced that he will seek candidacy for running as vice president. Cayetano, who he is the member of Nacionalista Party, did not mention his presidential running-mate as the Nacionalistas will meet in a few days, for their decision. On October 1, Duterte said that if he would ever run for president, he would prefer Cayetano to be his running mate. Days later, Duterte declined the offer to be Cayetano and Bongbong Marcos' offers to be their presidential running mate. However, during a phone interview with the Philippine Daily Inquirer In November 2015, Cayetano confirmed Duterte as his running mate if ever the latter confirms his candidacy for presidency.

=== Grace Poe (Independent) ===
Grace Poe's surprising first-place finish in the 2013 Senate election as an independent made her a likely contender for the presidency but she dismissed any plans of running in April 2014, saying she was not considering "anything higher at this point" and even declaring that Senator Miriam Defensor Santiago was the most qualified to run as president.

On President Aquino's state visit to Canada in May 2015, the president disclosed that he had met with Poe prior to the trip, although he didn't say what the meeting was for. A couple of days later, Poe confirmed that she did meet with Aquino. Poe said that they "discussed his intention to choose a candidate who, first and foremost, has the trust of the nation, and, secondly, has the potential to win in the election, in order to sustain the reforms especially against corruption and the pro-poor programs of the government." Poe expected more meetings with Aquino in June.

On June 2, UNA interim president Toby Tiangco, responding to calls for Jejomar Binay to "come clean" on his corruption allegations, said in a press conference that Poe is not qualified to run either for president or vice president after citing her certificate of candidacy in the 2013 Senate election, which stated that she is a resident for six years and six months; adding three years for the 2016 election, nine years and six months or six months short mandated by the constitution. Two days later, before a Senate session, Poe said that she wrote "six years and six months" because it was in April 2006 that her home in the United States was sold. Poe, who had been a resident of the United States for 13 years, returned to the Philippines after her father Fernando Poe, Jr., a presidential candidate in the 2004 elections, died in December 2004. She said that she had proof that she has been living in the Philippines since February 2005. She said, that despite being a congressman for Navotas, Tiangco lives elsewhere, and that her decision on whether to run in 2016 is "50%" sure. Poe also observed that the attacks from UNA only began after she signed the Senate Blue Ribbon subcommittee report recommending plunder and graft cases against Binay.

On September 16, at a gathering at the University of the Philippines Diliman in Quezon City, Poe announced her intention to seek the presidency, saying that "no one person or group has a monopoly on a straight path advocacy" of President Aquino, a shot against the Aquino party's nominee Roxas, who was advocating for continuation of the "Daang Matuwid" (straight path) advocacy of Aquino; while also hitting the Administration programs. This resulted in the Palace questioning their Daang Matuwid advocacy contrary to their speeches.

On December 1, the commission's second division had formally disqualified Poe from running as president in the 2016 elections and cancelled her filed Certificate of Candidacy for not failing to meet with citizenship and residency requirements. The division voted 3–0 in favor of the petition filed by Attorney Estrella Elamparo to disqualify Poe. The decision stated that Poe had failed to comply with the 10-year residency requirement, mandatory for a presidential candidate.

On December 23, 2015, the commission en banc disqualified Poe from running as president in the 2016 elections for failing to meet the 10-year residency requirement. Poe said she would appeal the disqualification to the Supreme Court. On December 28, 2015, the Supreme Court issued two temporary restraining orders against the decision of the commission en banc.

On March 8, 2016, voting 9–6, the Supreme Court voted to affirm Poe's natural-born status and 10-year residency. On April 9, 2016, the Supreme Court declared their ruling as final and executory.

==== Francis Escudero (Independent) ====
Senator Francis Escudero (independent) said in a March 2012 Rappler interview that "Let me be honest, candid, yet factual about it. I would be very interested in seeking a higher office in 2016 for the simple reason that I'm halfway through my last term." By May 2015, Grace Poe told reporters that she would not run against Escudero.

On September 17 at the Club Filipino in San Juan, Escudero announced his vice presidential bid, becoming Poe's running mate.

=== Mar Roxas (Liberal) ===
Senate President Franklin Drilon, when describing the Liberal Party's plans for Interior Secretary Mar Roxas' in 2016, told the media in January 2013 that "so far as the LP is concerned, [and] in so far as I am concerned, we believe that he is best qualified for 2016." Two years later, Drilon told DZIQ AM radio that Roxas had expressed his interest internally within the party. Several Liberal Party stalwarts had by then expressed that Roxas should declare his intentions at that time, with some such as Budget Secretary Florencio Abad suggesting that Roxas may slide down to run for the vice presidency again.

Aquino had a series of meetings between Roxas, Grace Poe and Francis Escudero from prior to Aquino's state visit to Canada in May, until days before his final State of the Nation Address in July, including a July dinner with all three of them at the Bahay Pangarap, Aquino's official residence at the Malacañang Palace complex. While Roxas was seen as Aquino's choice to succeed him, another question was who would be Roxas' running mate, as Poe had earlier said that she'd rather run with Escudero as her running mate.

On July 31, 2015, at an event dubbed as "A Gathering of Friends", Roxas formally accepted the Liberal Party's nomination after he was officially endorsed by President Benigno Aquino III in the presence of their political allies at the Club Filipino, San Juan, where Roxas had announced his decision to withdraw from the 2010 presidential election and give way to Aquino's presidential bid. Aquino also announced his candidacy there on September 9, 2009. On the same day, Roxas formally launched his campaign website.

==== Leni Robredo (Liberal) ====
In August 2015, Representative Leni Robredo, from Camarines Sur's third district (Liberal Party), said that talk of plans of her running in 2016 is "too soon", and that she'd only run if she's "indispensable".

After the initial objections of her daughters, Robredo decided to run for vice president, accepting the offers of President Aquino and Mar Roxas. She officially announced her candidacy for the office on October 5, 2015, at the Club Filipino.

=== Standalone vice presidential candidate ===
One vice presidential candidate did not have a running mate.

==== Antonio Trillanes (Independent) ====
In the news program Bandila's May 30, 2014, segment where a guest is asked to answer only "yes" or "no," Senator Antonio Trillanes IV (Nacionalista Party) was asked if he would run for vice president in 2016 and responded by saying "Let's just say yes, I will run. As for what position, I will abide by the Nacionalista Party."

By August 2015, Trillanes revealed his plans of running as an independent vice presidential candidate, saying that the Nacionalistas would not endorse a candidate if more than one of them ran for the vice presidency. Trillanes' own group, Magdalo, backed his vice presidential bid.

In a general assembly of MAGDALO coalition members, Trillanes announced that he will run for vice president as an independent, but will support the presidential bid of Senator Grace Poe.

Trillanes questioned the presidential bid of Rodrigo Duterte, saying that if Duterte wins, his presidency will be a disaster to the Philippines.

== Debates ==
The Commission on Elections confirmed that they will organize three presidential debates and one vice presidential debate. This was the first time that the commission organized debates since the 1992 presidential election. The debates were dubbed as PiliPinas Debates 2016 (transl. The Philippines Chooses).

A separate debate, Harapan ng Bise (transl. Face-off of the Vice [Presidents]), was organized and hosted by ABS-CBN. Not all vice presidential candidates attended.

Legend
P Participated A Absent

=== Presidential debates ===
Date	Organizers	Media partners	Location	Binay	Defensor Santiago	Duterte	Poe	Roxas
February 21, 2016	COMELEC	GMA Network and Philippine Daily Inquirer	Capitol University, Cagayan de Oro	P	P	P	P	P
March 20, 2016	COMELEC	TV5, Philippine Star and BusinessWorld	University of the Philippines Cebu, Cebu City	P	A	P	P	P
April 24, 2016	COMELEC	ABS-CBN and Manila Bulletin	University of Pangasinan, Dagupan	P	P	P	P	P

=== Vice presidential debates ===
Date	Organizers	Media partners	Location	Cayetano	Escudero	Honasan	Marcos	Robredo	Trillanes
April 10, 2016	COMELEC	CNN Philippines, Rappler and Business Mirror	University of Santo Tomas, Manila	P	P	P	P	P	P
April 17, 2016	ABS-CBN	ABS-CBN	ABS-CBN Broadcasting Center, Quezon City	P	P	A	A	P	P

== Opinion polling ==
Opinion polling in Philippines is conducted by Social Weather Stations (SWS), Pulse Asia and other third-party pollsters.

=== For president ===
View source data.

=== For vice president ===
View source data.

== Campaign ==
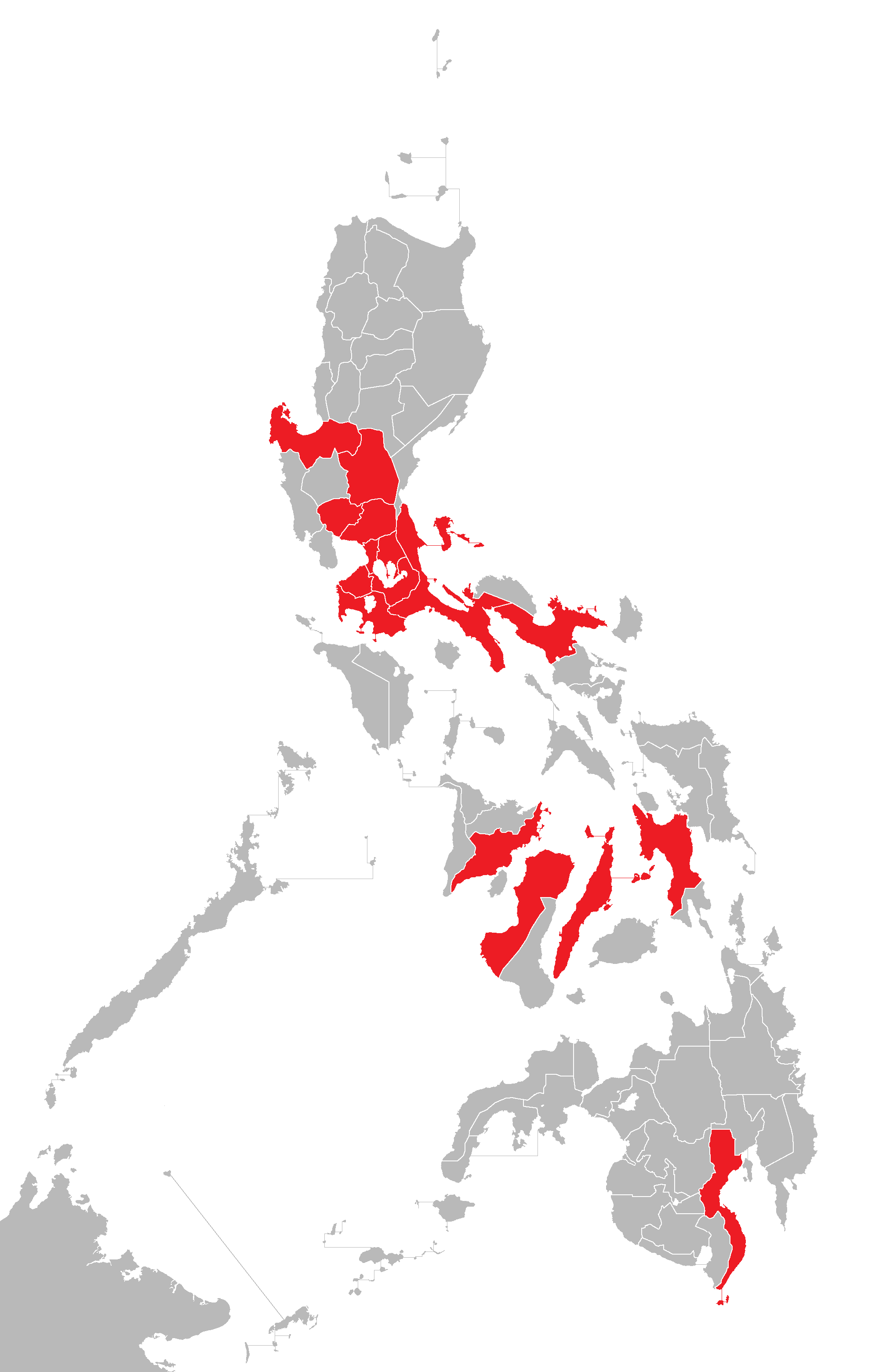
Provinces that have more than one million voters for this election. Together, along with Metro Manila, this comprises more than half of the registered voters for this election. Candidates usually personally campaign in these locales in order to reduce costs.

While the campaign period as set by law started on February 9, 2016, candidates had earlier started campaigning as early as late 2015, as the courts have struck the ban on premature campaigning as unconstitutional.

=== Issues ===
The continuation of outgoing president Benigno Aquino III's policies is seen to be the main theme for this election. Former Interior Secretary Mar Roxas promises the continuation of the "Daang Matuwid" ("straight path") anti-corruption drive by the last president, which is appealing among the elites. Roxas's base was mostly middle-class Filipinos. Vice President Jejomar Binay's policies is seen to be opposite of Aquino's, such as the former's opposition to the enactment of the Bangsamoro Basic Law, and on how to approach China concerning the territorial disputes in the South China Sea, while presenting himself as a man of the people, and fighting out allegations of corruption while serving as mayor of Makati, the country's financial hub. Senator Grace Poe's campaign is seen to be an alternative to Roxas and Davao City mayor Rodrigo Duterte; her image as untarnished by corruption is liked by the elite, while she sends messages that are pro-poor. Duterte is banking on a law and order platform, which includes the proposals concerning federalism in the Philippines. Senator Miriam Defensor Santiago, who almost won the presidency in 1992, insists that she has recovered from cancer.

=== Start of campaign period for national positions ===
Proclamation rallies were held by all five presidential tickets at the start of campaigning on February 9. The Jejomar Binay and Gregorio Honasan ticket started their campaign at a slum in Mandaluyong, to "be with the Filipino poor". Rodrigo Duterte and Alan Peter Cayetano started campaigning at Tondo, Manila. Roxas City, the hometown of Mar Roxas, was the host of the Roxas and Leni Robredo tandem's proclamation rally. Grace Poe and Francis Escudero had their proclamation rally at Plaza Miranda in Quiapo, Manila. Miriam Defensor Santiago held their proclamation rally at her running mate's Bongbong Marcos' hometown of Batac, Ilocos Norte. Antonio Trillanes kicked off his campaign at General Santos.

On the first presidential debate since 1992 on February 21 in Cagayan de Oro hosted by GMA Network, the candidates commented that they were not given enough time to express their views. The Binay campaign lamented that the question on political dynasties was asked on him at a round where supposedly issues about Mindanao were the topics. Several weeks later, on March 8, the Supreme Court reversed the decision of the commission to disqualify Poe, thereby allowing her to run.

In the Visayas leg of the presidential debate held in Cebu City hosted by TV5, the respective campaigns were generally more receptive of the conduct of the debate. The debate proper though was delayed due to a misunderstanding of the rules: Binay was informed by debate moderator Luchi Cruz-Valdez that bringing of notes was allowed, but the commission ruled it out when the Roxas camp objected to it.

=== Start of campaign period for local positions ===
Candidates started gaining endorsements from local politicians when campaigning for local positions started just right before Easter. Poe got the endorsement of Manila Mayor Joseph Estrada over Binay, who was Estrada's running mate in 2010. One Cebu abandoned their original support for Binay to Duterte, vowing to deliver one million votes. Binay also lost the support of the Remullas of Cavite of which Cavite Governor Jonvic is his spokesperson, to Duterte.

On an April 17 campaign rally, Duterte said on an Australian rape victim that "Was I mad because she was raped? Yes, that's one of the reasons. But she really was beautiful. The mayor should have been first." This was met by condemnation both from his opponents, and other sectors of society, including the Australian ambassador to Manila. Duterte apologized for the incident, blamed his "gutter language", but did not apologize for his remarks.

The third leg of the presidential debate was held in Pangasinan on April 24. When asked about the ongoing South China Sea dispute, Duterte said he will abide the decision of the arbitral tribunal in the Philippines v. China case, and if tribunal rules in favor of the Philippines and China refuses to honor the decision, he will ride a jetski to the disputed islands to plant a Philippine flag.

On April 26, Antonio Trillanes claims that Duterte has a bank account worth ₱211 million that wasn't declared in his statement of assets, liabilities and net worth. On the same day, Duterte denied the existence of the bank accounts, which were supposedly in a Bank of the Philippine Islands (BPI) branch in Julia Vargas Avenue in Pasig, and was jointly held with his daughter Sara. A day later, Duterte acknowledged the existence of the bank account at the BPI branch in Julia Vargas, but it had "only thousands" in funds. Duterte later challenged Trillanes to execute an affidavit stating how he got the information, and he'd promise to open the account. On May 2, Trillanes and Duterte's lawyer met at the BPI Julia Vargas branch. Duterte's lawyer brought with him a special power of attorney requesting BPI to certify the existence of Duterte's account. In the end, no bank records were released, as the bank asked for more time to accede to the request. Trillanes expressed disappointment, as the special power of attorney invoked on whether the bank account asked for the current balance of the account, not the transaction history that he wanted.

A week before the election, an anti-Duterte advertisement began appearing on television; it was already on rotation in radio stations. Paid for by Trillanes, the commercial features children reacting to Duterte's controversial remarks. The video shows several children remarking Duterte's controversial remarks and acts, including his cursing of Pope Francis and the comments about the rape-slay on the Australian missionary. It was widely disapproved at social media. ABS-CBN defended their decision to air the ad, saying that "We are duty-bound to air a legitimate ad." A similar ad also aired on GMA Network. Alan Peter Cayetano said that the ad had been rejected by other TV networks, but was "blindly approved" by ABS-CBN's ethics committee. He also accused President Benigno Aquino III and two other rivals such as Mar Roxas and Grace Poe and ABS-CBN of making the ad. A Taguig court later disallowed the commercial to be aired, saying that "These advertisements do manifestly oppose a candidate and thus the court cannot allow minor children to be used in such black propaganda."

A few days before the election, Roxas called for Poe to back out, in order to defeat Duterte. Poe rebuffed Roxas' offer, saying that she would never withdraw from the presidential race. Meanwhile, President Aquino also called on Poe, Binay and Santiago to unite against Duterte. A Binay spokesperson retorted that instead of the president calling for unity against a specific candidate, Aquino should've just insured of clean elections.

=== Miting de avance ===
A tradition of Philippine politics, the "miting de avance" is the final political rally before the election itself. For the Duterte campaign, the miting de avance was held at Rizal Park in Manila; however, his campaign pointed to the Liberal Party of sabotaging the rally, as backhoes dug up holes in the park. The administrators of the park countered that they were only removing the asphalt from the Burnham green of the park.

Two days before the election, all mitings de avance were held in Metro Manila. The Santiago campaign held their "youth supporters rally" at West Triangle, Quezon City. The Roxas campaign held theirs at the Quezon Memorial Circle in the same city, while the Binay campaign held it at the corner of Kalayaan Avenue and Lawton Avenue in Makati. Grace Poe held her miting de avance at Plaza Miranda in Manila. The Duterte campaign pushed through with their rally at Rizal Park.

== Results ==
Congress canvassed the results in record time of three days. Davao City Mayor Rodrigo Duterte and Representative from Camarines Sur Leni Robredo were proclaimed president and vice president on May 30, in front of a joint session, at the Batasang Pambansa Complex. Duterte notably skipped his proclamation, as he has consistently skipped his prior proclamations.

=== For president ===
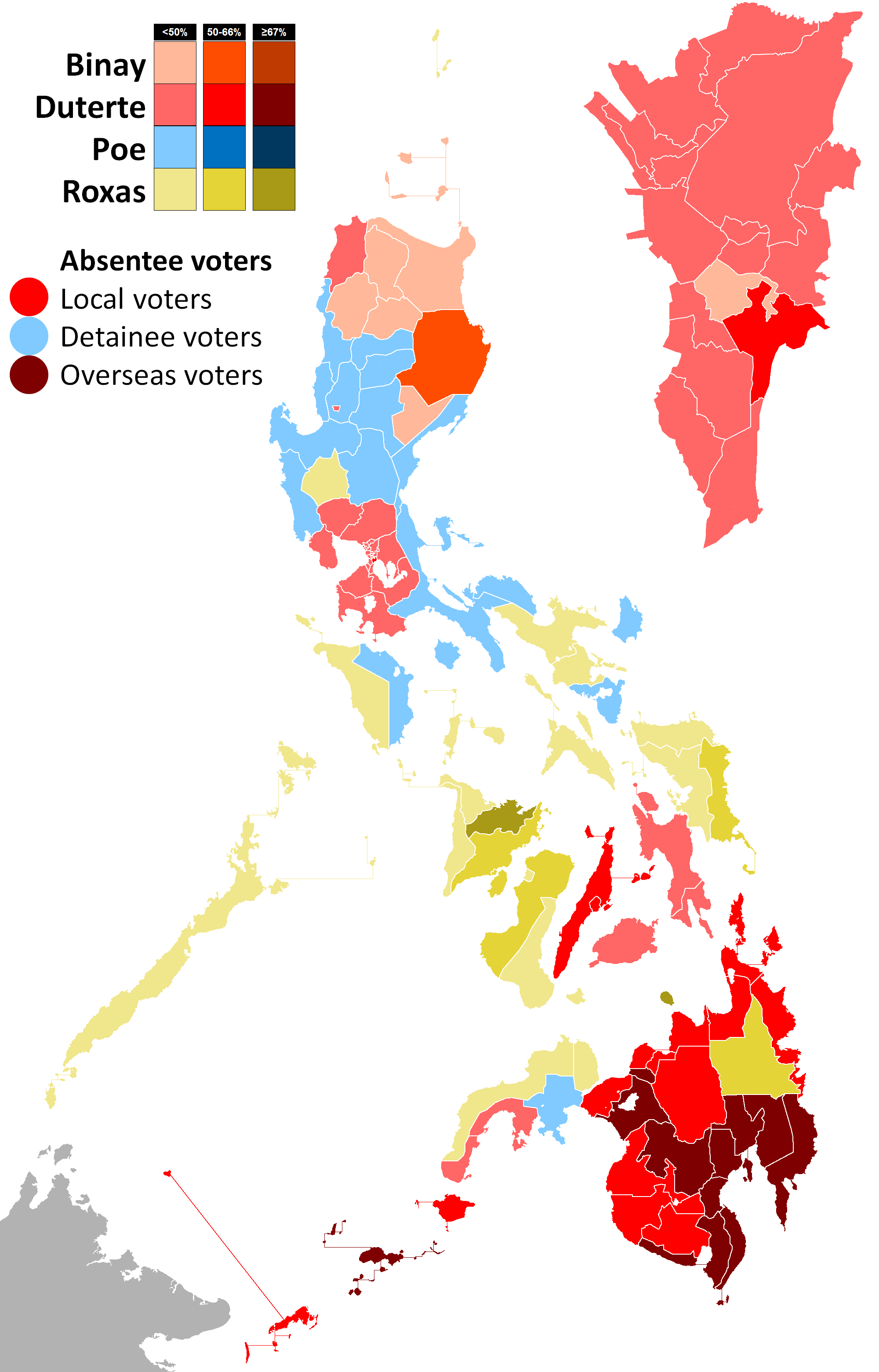
As above, but showing the percentages of the winning candidate per province and city. Note that to avoid confusion with Roxas, the color used for Duterte here is red, which was his campaign color.

All candidates except for Poe and Santiago carried their respective hometowns. Duterte carried the majority of Mindanao, the so-called "Mega Manila" (except Makati where Binay won) and the Cebuano-speaking provinces in the Visayas, except Negros Oriental. Roxas carried the Ilonggo-speaking provinces, the Waray speaking provinces, Negros Oriental, his running mate's province of Camarines Sur and neighboring Albay in Bicol, and Mimaropa. Poe carried most of the Ilocos Region, except Ilocos Norte, including her father's home province of Pangasinan. Binay carried his parents' home region of Cagayan Valley and his hometown of Makati, where he served as mayor for several decades. Santiago didn't win in any province.

Candidate	Party	Votes	%
Rodrigo Duterte	PDP–Laban	16,601,997	39.02
Mar Roxas	Liberal Party	9,978,175	23.45
Grace Poe	Independent	9,100,991	21.39
Jejomar Binay	United Nationalist Alliance	5,416,140	12.73
Miriam Defensor Santiago	People's Reform Party	1,455,532	3.42
Total		42,552,835	100.00
Valid votes		42,552,835	94.61
Invalid/blank votes (Note: Includes 25,779 votes for Roy Señeres (Partido ng Manggagawa at Magsasaka) who withdrew and died after the ballots were printed.)		2,426,316	5.39
Total votes		44,979,151	100.00
Registered voters/turnout		55,739,911	80.69
Source: Congress

Popular vote
Rodrigo Duterte	39.01%
Mar Roxas	23.45%
Grace Poe	21.39%
Jejomar Binay	12.73%
Miriam Defensor Santiago	3.42%

==== Result by island group and region ====
Result per island group
Island group	Duterte		Roxas		Poe		Binay		Santiago		Total	%
Island group	Votes	%	Votes	%	Votes	%	Votes	%	Votes	%	Total	%
Luzon	7,350,795	31.03	4,397,249	18.56	6,657,689	28.10	4,119,062	17.39	1,168,133	4.93	23,692,928	55.68
Visayas	2,810,822	31.87	3,610,948	40.95	1,415,869	16.06	785,456	8.91	195,707	2.22	8,818,802	20.72
Mindanao	6,121,852	63.82	1,918,678	20.00	999,851	10.42	498,484	5.20	53,792	0.56	9,592,657	22.54
Absentee	318,528	71.03	51,300	11.44	27,382	6.15	13,138	2.93	37,900	8.45	448,248	1.05
Total	16,601,997	39.01	9,978,175	23.45	9,100,991	21.39	5,416,140	12.73	1,455,532	3.42	42,552,835	100

==== By region ====
Region	Duterte		Roxas		Poe		Binay		Santiago		Total	%
Region	Votes	%	Votes	%	Votes	%	Votes	%	Votes	%	Total	%
I	621,827	25.77	309,634	12.83	834,439	34.57	449,792	18.64	197,791	8.20	2,413,483	5.67
CAR	134,049	18.67	131,937	18.38	201,508	28.07	169,902	23.66	80,597	11.22	717,993	1.69
II	264,952	17.72	182,310	12.20	321,002	21.47	683,344	45.71	43,253	2.89	1,494,861	3.51
III	1,642,663	34.05	798,567	16.58	1,481,482	30.75	701,092	14.55	193,618	4.02	4,817,417	11.32
NCR	2,127,273	44.08	693,593	14.37	997,869	20.68	672,903	13.94	333,913	6.92	4,825,551	11.34
IV-A	1,950,145	33.92	963,444	16.76	1,584,113	27.55	996,108	17.33	255,656	4.45	5,749,466	13.51
IV-B	262,157	21.59	428,323	35.27	343,985	28.33	161,779	13.32	18,103	1.49	1,214,347	2.85
V	347,729	14.13	889,441	36.16	893,291	36.32	284,142	11.55	45,202	1.84	2,459,805	5.78
VI	289,547	14.14	1,224,577	59.83	318,125	15.54	132,308	6.46	82,290	4.03	2,046,847	4.81
NIR	434,035	23.53	934,177	50.66	341,289	18.51	94,857	5.14	39,558	2.16	1,843,916	4.33
VII	1,473,936	51.70	824,439	28.92	334,523	11.74	175,283	6.15	42,375	1.49	2,850,556	6.70
VIII	613,304	29.52	627,755	30.22	421,932	20.30	383,008	18.44	31,484	1.52	2,077,483	4.88
IX	538,351	39.73	383,538	28.30	321,805	23.75	97,356	7.18	14,126	1.04	1,355,176	3.18
X	1,080,357	54.97	514,496	26.18	248,838	12.66	107,568	5.47	14,182	0.72	1,965,441	4.62
XI	1,840,031	89.47	118,145	5.74	67,421	3.28	24,960	1.21	5,959	0.30	2,056,516	4.83
XII	1,062,828	66.83	272,844	17.16	145,671	9.16	98,973	6.22	10,146	0.63	1,590,462	3.74
XIII	679,542	55.51	357,266	29.19	140,936	11.51	40,053	3.27	6,299	0.52	1,224,096	2.88
ARMM	920,743	65.72	272,389	19.44	75,180	5.37	129,574	9.25	3,080	0.22	1,400,966	3.29
Absentee	318,528	71.03	51,300	11.44	27,382	6.15	13,138	2.93	37,900	8.45	448,248	1.05
Total	16,601,997	39.02	9,978,175	23.45	9,100,991	21.39	5,416,140	12.73	1,455,532	3.42	42,552,835	100%

=== For vice president ===
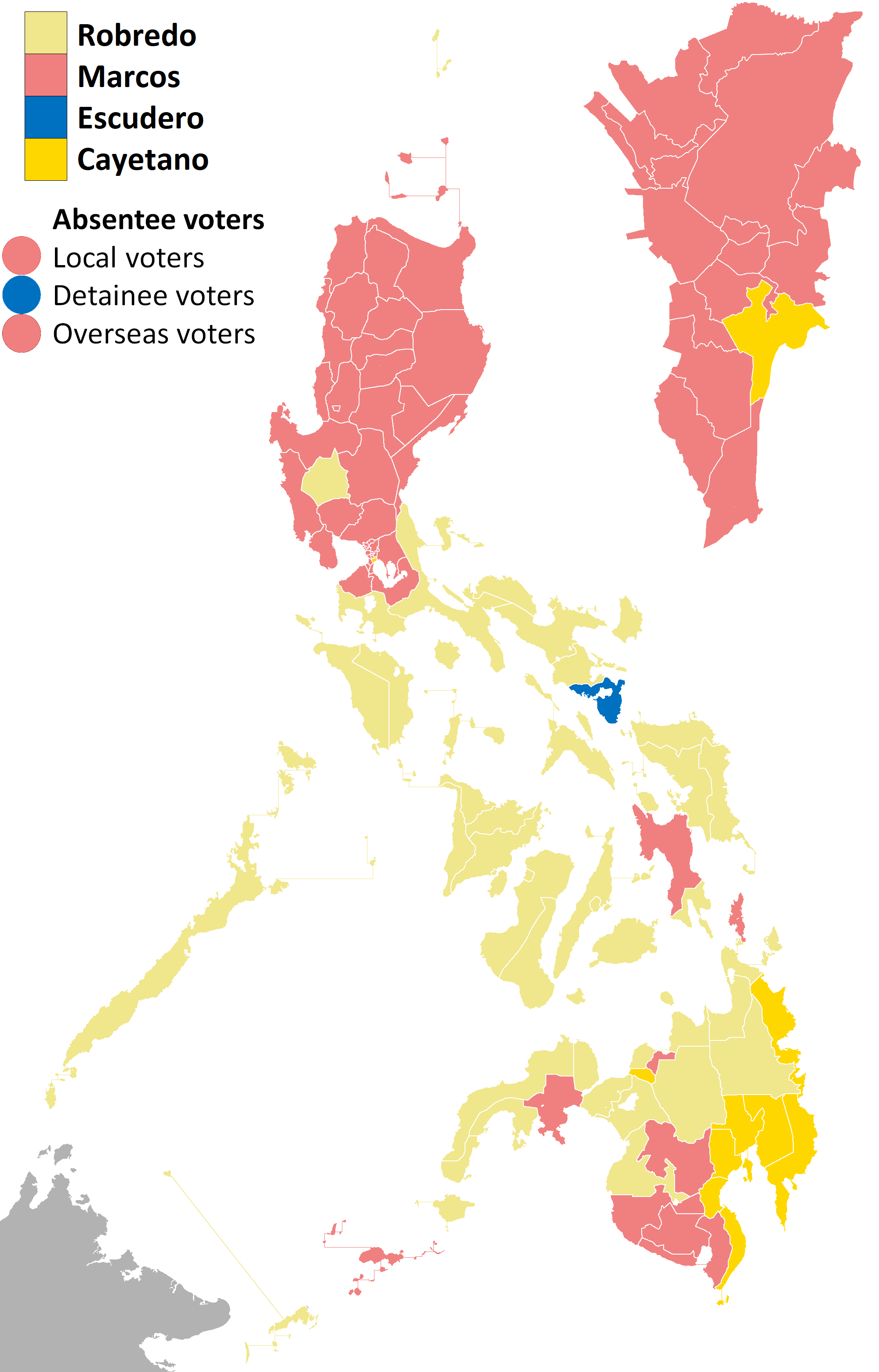
Provincial and city breakdown of the vice presidential election.

Robredo carried the Bicol Region, except for Sorsogon, Escudero's home province, Roxas' stronghold of Western Visayas and Negros, the Autonomous Region in Muslim Mindanao, Northern Mindanao, the entire Mimaropa region, majority of provinces in Eastern Visayas, majority of Caraga region, majority of Zamboanga region, Quezon province, Central Visayas less Cebu City, almost half of Soccsksargen, and President Aquino's home province of Tarlac. Marcos won the so-called "Solid North", the National Capital Region (except Taguig, where Cayetano won), his mother's home province of Leyte, and all provinces of Soccsksargen. Cayetano won in his hometown of Taguig, and in Duterte's home region in the Davao Region.

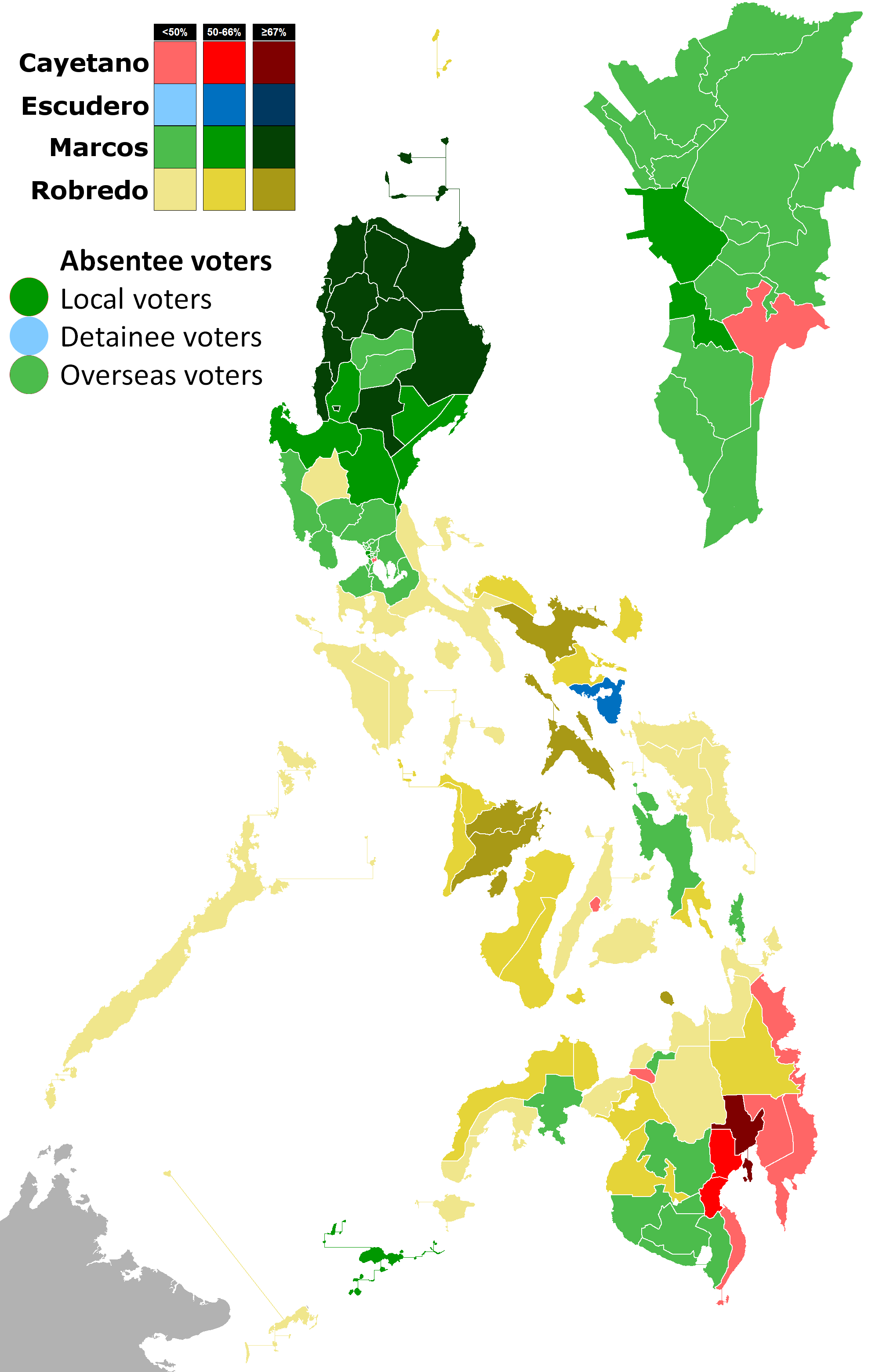
As above, but showing the percentages of the winning candidate per province and city. Note that to avoid confusion with Robredo, the color used for Cayetano here is red. To further avoid confusion with Cayetano, green is used for Marcos.

Robredo's winning margin of 0.61% is the closest margin since Fernando Lopez's victory in the 1965 vice presidential election. Marcos subsequently protested the results, which was unanimously struck down by the Presidential Electoral Tribunal on February 16, 2021.

Candidate	Party	Votes	%
Leni Robredo	Liberal Party	14,418,817	35.11
Bongbong Marcos (Note: Running mate of Miriam Defensor Santiago (People's Reform Party))	Independent (Note: Nacionalista Party member running as an independent)	14,155,344	34.47
Alan Peter Cayetano (Note: Running mate of Rodrigo Duterte (PDP–Laban))	Independent	5,903,379	14.38
Francis Escudero (Note: Running mate of Grace Poe (independent))	Independent	4,931,962	12.01
Antonio Trillanes (Note: Supporting Grace Poe (independent))	Independent	868,501	2.11
Gregorio Honasan	United Nationalist Alliance	788,881	1.92
Total		41,066,884	100.00
Valid votes		41,066,884	91.30
Invalid/blank votes		3,912,267	8.70
Total votes		44,979,151	100.00
Registered voters/turnout		55,739,911	80.69
Source: Congress

Popular vote
Leni Robredo	35.11%
Bongbong Marcos	34.47%
Alan Peter Cayetano	14.38%
Francis Escudero	12.01%
Others	4.03%

==== Result by island group and region ====
Result per island group
Island group	Robredo		Marcos		Cayetano		Escudero		Trillanes		Honasan		Total	%
Island group	Votes	%	Votes	%	Votes	%	Votes	%	Votes	%	Votes	%	Total	%
Luzon	7,320,331	31.52	9,974,292	42.94	1,790,860	7.71	3,298,010	14.20	441,125	1.90	401,880	1.73	23,226,498	56.56
Visayas	4,095,216	48.85	1,660,402	19.81	1,336,944	15.95	893,951	10.66	237,099	2.83	160,137	1.91	8,383,749	20.42
Mindanao	2,956,631	33.39	2,361,691	26.67	2,421,818	27.35	710,560	8.02	185,304	2.09	219,108	2.47	8,855,112	21.56
Absentee	92,639	20.71	188,959	42.24	137,699	30.78	19,689	4.40	4,973	1.11	3,385	0.76	447,344	1.09
Total	14,418,817	35.11	14,155,344	34.47	5,903,379	14.38	4,931,962	12.01	868,501	2.11	788,881	1.92	41,066,884	100

==== By region ====
Region	Robredo		Marcos		Cayetano		Escudero		Trillanes		Honasan	
Region	Votes	%	Votes	%	Votes	%	Votes	%	Votes	%	Votes	%
I	302,456	12.68	1,786,073	74.87	64,841	2.72	172,688	7.24	37,061	1.55	22,460	0.94
CAR	121,248	17.25	459,041	65.30	26,971	3.84	68,644	9.76	18,058	2.57	9,040	1.28
II	192,197	13.23	1,077,068	74.16	37,297	2.57	97,301	6.70	20,229	1.39	28,314	1.95
III	1,334,701	28.30	2,137,891	45.32	353,234	7.49	717,625	15.21	98,591	2.09	74,972	1.59
NCR	1,365,458	28.46	2,186,414	45.58	613,071	12.78	508,965	10.61	52,602	1.10	70,554	1.47
IV-A	1,979,971	35.11	1,868,303	33.13	527,866	9.36	1,015,964	18.02	120,750	2.14	126,582	2.24
IV-B	507,218	43.84	269,237	23.27	85,334	7.38	213,635	18.47	46,502	4.02	34,996	3.02
V	1,517,082	63.88	190,265	8.01	82,246	3.46	503,188	21.19	47,332	1.99	34,962	1.47
VI	1,288,265	65.22	275,784	13.96	109,779	5.56	184,950	9.36	81,916	4.15	34,517	1.75
NIR	989,485	56.93	228,578	13.15	201,803	11.61	209,408	12.05	80,683	4.64	28,181	1.62
VII	1,124,006	41.25	396,393	14.55	840,644	30.85	258,658	9.49	46,205	1.70	58,998	2.16
VIII	693,460	35.64	759,647	39.05	184,718	9.49	240,935	12.38	28,295	1.45	38,441	1.99
IX	484,550	38.68	327,568	26.15	223,790	17.86	141,419	11.29	40,603	3.24	34,899	2.78
X	713,900	38.57	444,270	24.00	443,760	23.97	167,148	9.03	34,435	1.86	47,547	2.57
XI	245,303	14.12	487,090	28.05	891,457	51.33	76,723	4.42	14,562	0.84	21,624	1.24
XII	484,565	30.69	531,714	33.68	374,520	23.72	106,309	6.73	45,286	2.87	36,491	2.31
XIII	461,858	39.94	239,287	20.69	307,624	26.60	111,460	9.64	16,431	1.42	19,805	1.71
ARMM	566,455	44.28	331,762	25.94	180,667	14.12	107,501	8.40	33,987	2.66	58,742	4.60
Absentee	92,639	20.71	188,959	42.24	137,699	30.78	19,689	4.40	4,973	1.11	3,385	0.76
Total	14,418,817	35.11	14,155,344	34.47	5,903,379	14.38	4,931,962	12.01	868,501	2.11	788,881	1.92

==== Electoral protest ====
On the evening of May 10, Leni Robredo took first place on the unofficial vote count led by the Parish Pastoral Council on Responsible Voting (PPCRV), and Bongbong Marcos suspected that the Liberal Party manipulated the vice presidential votes in favor of Robredo. Marcos soon ordered the Commission on Elections to stop the unofficial count by the PPCRV, and he stated that no one has been aware that his lead on the unofficial vote count fell down.

Marcos then filed an election protest to the Presidential Electoral Tribunal on June 29, 2016, the eve of the oath-taking of the newly elected officials. Marcos wanted a recount in 27 provinces and cities, in 36,000 precincts. Marcos sought for the explanation of supposed 3 million undervotes which were allegedly "unaccounted for", which the Robredo camp said that is "normal". Robredo filed a counter-protest, which the tribunal rejected in September 2017. The tribunal also denied Marcos' first cause of action to nullify the result of the vice presidential election, because even if it is nullified, the tribunal ruled that it doesn't mean that he won.

On April 2, 2018, the manual recount of votes cast in Camarines Sur, Iloilo, and Negros Oriental, the results of the election which were contested by former senator Bongbong Marcos, started. The recount was originally scheduled for February but was postponed to March 19, and then moved again to April 2. The first day was plagued with issues of some ballots from Bato, Camarines Sur being drenched wet causing these to be intelligible, and missing audit cards. The Robredo camp said that these may have been damaged from previous floods and typhoons, and that the tribunal can go over to the ballot images, and reprint the audit logs from the records of the commission, while Marcos' lawyers said that it was recently doused over. Caguioa along with Senior Associate Justice Antonio Carpio were the only dissenters in a new resolution by the court ordering the parties to comment on the results of a recount of votes from Camarines Sur, Iloilo, and Negros Oriental.

In October 2019, a resolution by the Supreme Court sitting as the Presidential Electoral Tribunal confirmed that Vice President Leni Robredo's lead over former senator Bongbong Marcos increased by 15,000 votes after it conducted a recount in three provinces chosen by Marcos. SC Associate Justice Benjamin Caguioa questioned the PET why it has not dismissed former senator Bongbong Marcos's election protest against Vice President Leni Robredo despite its "clear and unmistakable lack of basis."

"Undoubtedly, protestant failed to make out his case. Why not apply Rule 65 now?" Caguioa said in a 7-page dissenting opinion. Rule 65 of the 2010 PET Rules allows a Protestant to choose not more than three provinces that "best exemplify" the fraud that he alleges happened in an election. Once ballots there are examined, the tribunal may dismiss the case if it is convinced that the Protestant will "most probably fail to make out his case."

Marcos filed an inhibition (recusal) plea earlier against Associate Justice Benjamin Caguioa. However, the Supreme Court junked the plea, issuing a "stern warning" against the former senator that any unfounded and inappropriate accusation will be dealt with in the future with more severity.

The Supreme Court sitting as the Presidential Electoral Tribunal also earlier upheld the 25-percent shading threshold, a main contention of Marcos's camp in their electoral protest.

On February 16, 2021, the PET unanimously dismissed Bongbong Marcos' electoral protest against Vice President Leni Robredo. Media reports cited the reasons for the dismissal as: "failure to allege specific acts showing electoral fraud"; "allegations (which) were bare, laden with generic & repetitious allegations, no critical information as to time, place and manner of irregularities,” and "the absence of substantial recovery of votes in the 3 pilot provinces Marcos had chosen where Robredo actually gained additional votes with 1,510,718 against Marcos’ 204,512."

=== Results per province ===
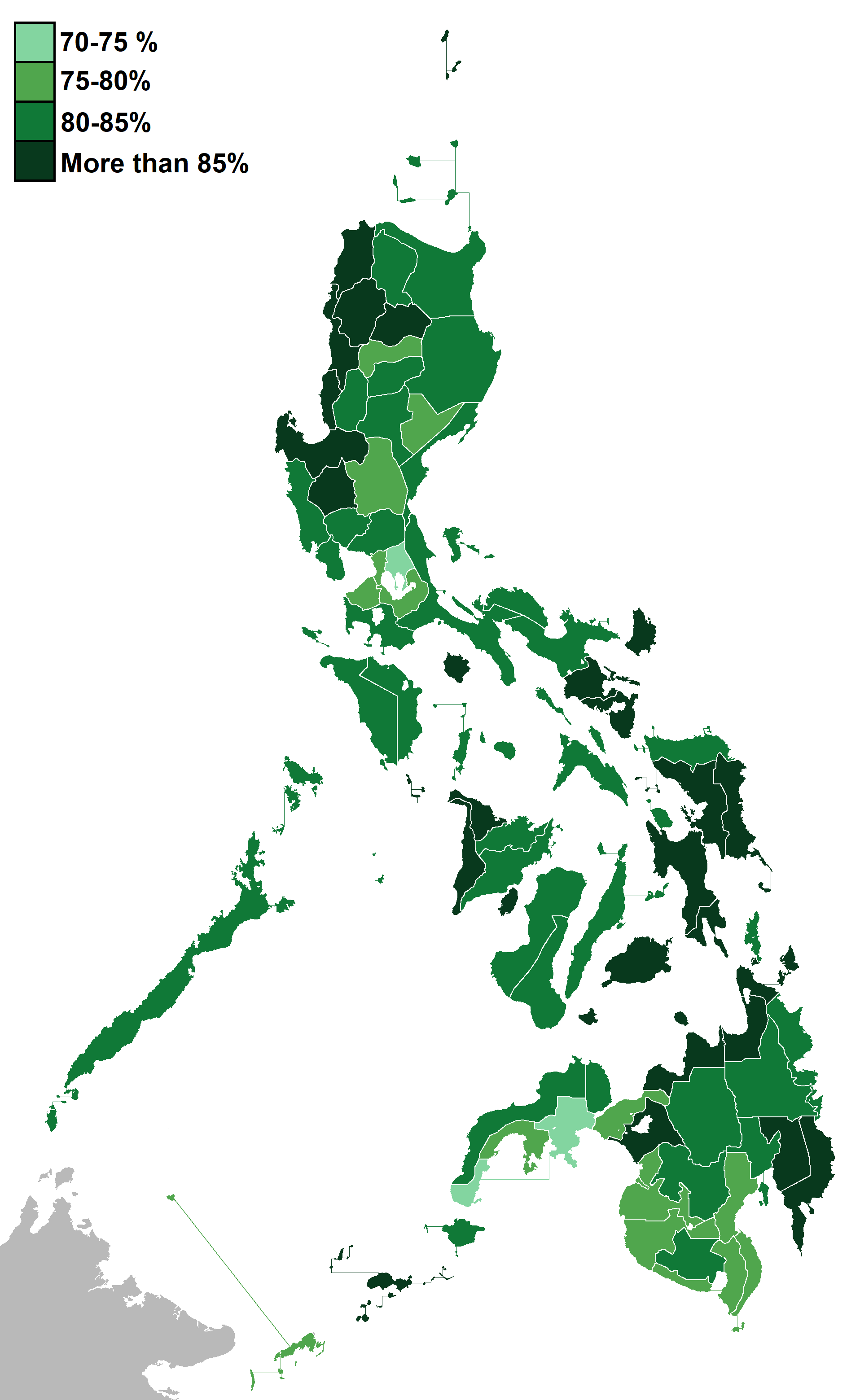
Turnout per province

Each province and city that is independent of a province and is a legislative district by itself sends its certificates of canvass to Congress. Each diplomatic post, local absentee voters and detainee voters also send their respective certificates of canvass. From there, the results are tallied in a joint session of Congress.

Notably, most candidates won in their home regions, provinces or cities. Duterte (Davao Region), Roxas (Western Visayas), Binay (Makati) Robredo (Camarines Sur), Marcos (Ilocos Region), Cayetano (Taguig) and Escudero (Sorsogon) won in their respective strongholds. Roxas, Santiago, Cayetano and Robredo were also helped by votes from their respective running mates' strongholds (Camarines Sur, Ilocos Region, Davao Region and Western Visayas, respectively). Binay, Poe, Duterte and Marcos were also helped from votes from which their families originated (Cagayan Valley, Pangasinan, Cebu and Leyte, respectively). Duterte was particularly helped by his big winning margins in Mindanao, where he polled more than 60% of the vote in some places.

For the presidential election, the following candidates won in these places:

- Duterte: Most of Mindanao, Central Visayas, Leyte and Biliran, Metro Manila, Calabarzon (except Quezon), Bataan, Baguio, Bulacan, Ilocos Norte and Pampanga
- Roxas, Western Visayas, Negros Island Region, Samar Island, Mimaropa (except Oriental Mindoro and Marinduque), Albay, Camarines Sur, Agusan del Sur, Masbate, Camiguin, Misamis Occidental, Batanes, Tarlac, and Zamboanga del Norte
- Poe: Ilocos Region (except Ilocos Norte), Aurora, Camarines Norte, Ifugao, Mountain Province, Nueva Ecija, Nueva Vizcaya, Pangasinan, Quezon, Zamboanga del Sur, Zambales, Oriental Mindoro, Marinduque, Catanduanes, Sorsogon
- Binay: Cagayan Valley (except Batanes and Nueva Vizcaya), Abra, Apayao, Kalinga, Makati
- Santiago: Although Santiago didn't win a province, her largest shares of the vote came from Baguio, Benguet, Ilocos Norte and Iloilo.

For the vice presidential election, the following candidates won in these places:

- Robredo, Bicol Region (except Sorsogon), Visayas (except Cebu City, Mandaue, Biliran and Leyte), Batangas, Batanes, Quezon, Tarlac, Northern Mindanao (except Cagayan de Oro and Iligan). Zamboanga Peninsula (except Zamboanga del Sur), Autonomous Region in Muslim Mindanao (except Sulu). Caraga (except for Dinagat Islands and Surigao del Sur)
- Marcos: The "Solid North" part of Luzon (except Batanes), Central Luzon (except Tarlac), Metro Manila (except Taguig), Cagayan de Oro, Soccsksargen, Dinagat Islands, Sulu, Zamboanga del Sur, and Leyte.
- Cayetano: Davao Region, Cebu City, Mandaue, Butuan, Iligan, Taguig, and Surigao del Sur
- Escudero: Sorsogon

Negros Oriental's winning streak of being the presidential bellwether that started in 1969 ended in this election, when Roxas won there, but Duterte won the national count. It was replaced by Basilan, which now has the longest winning streak, starting in 1981.

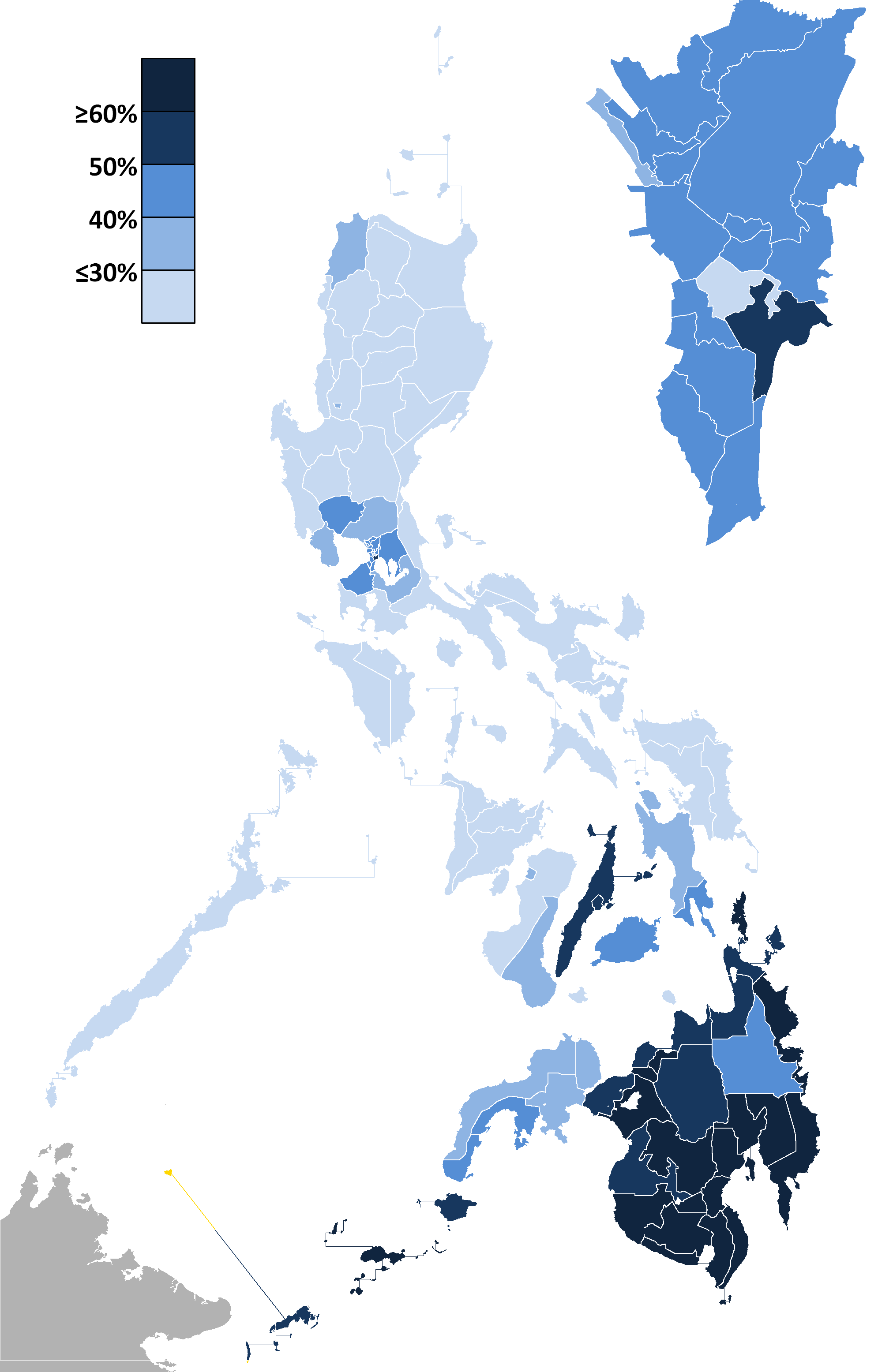
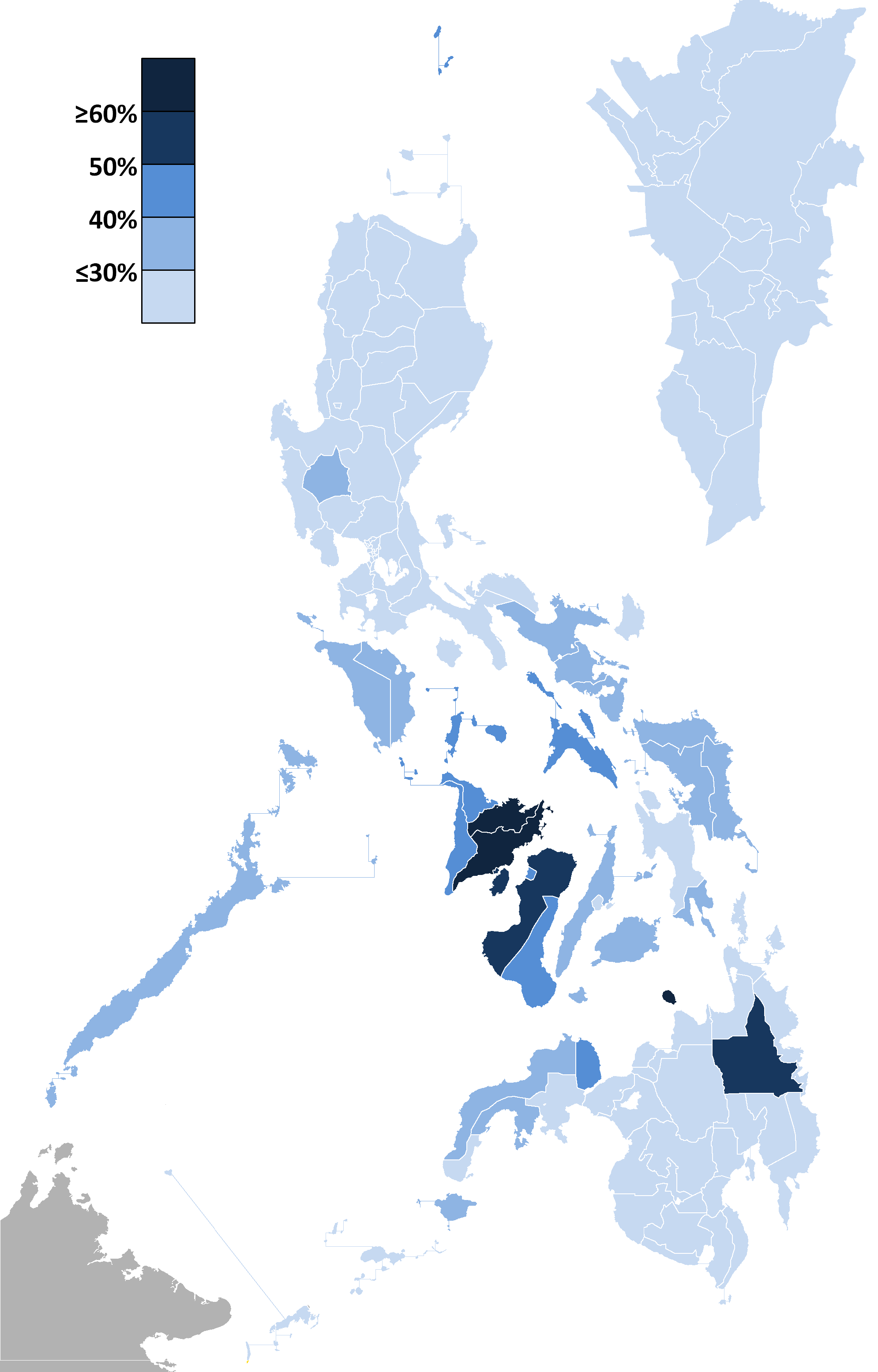
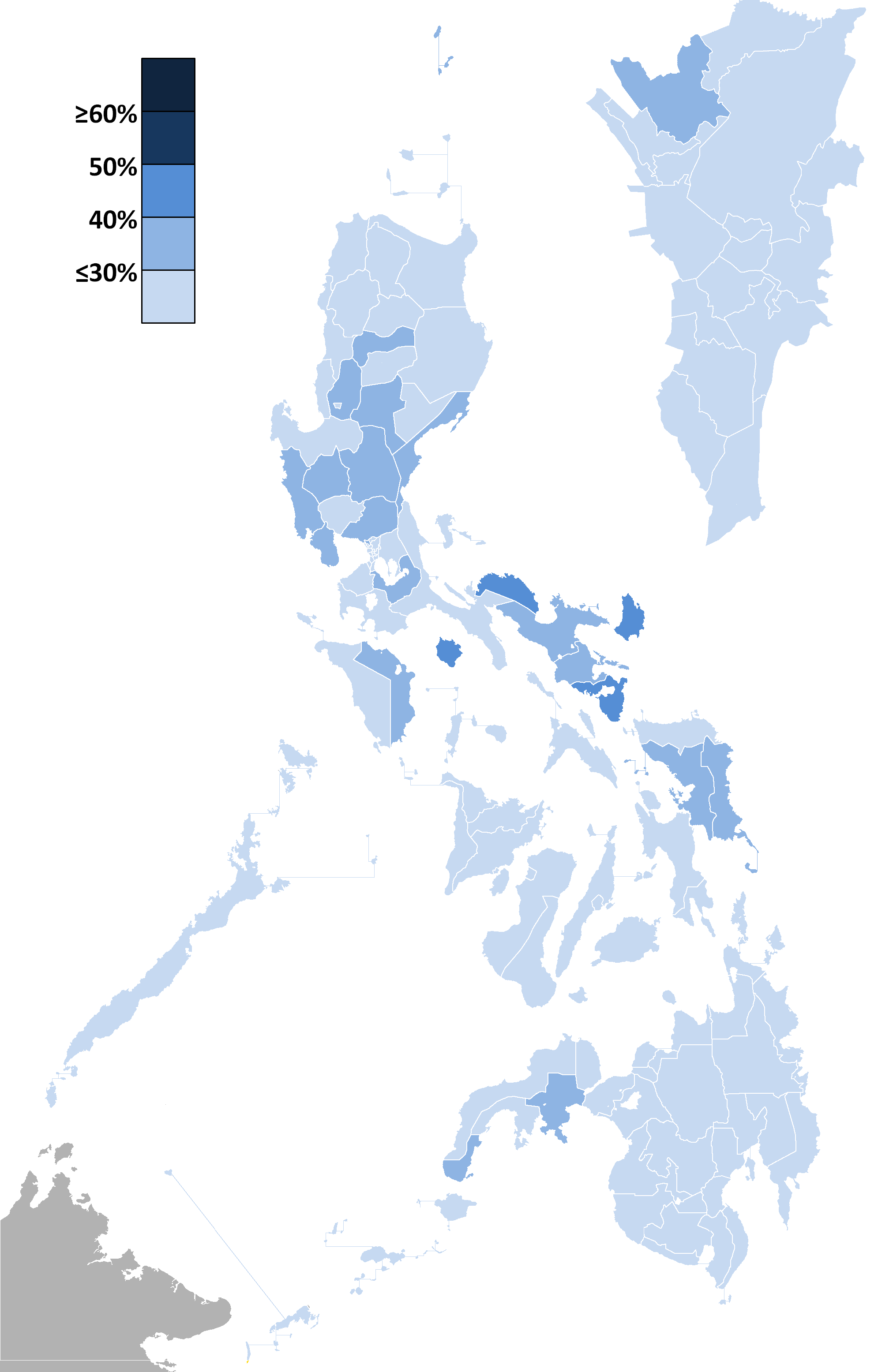
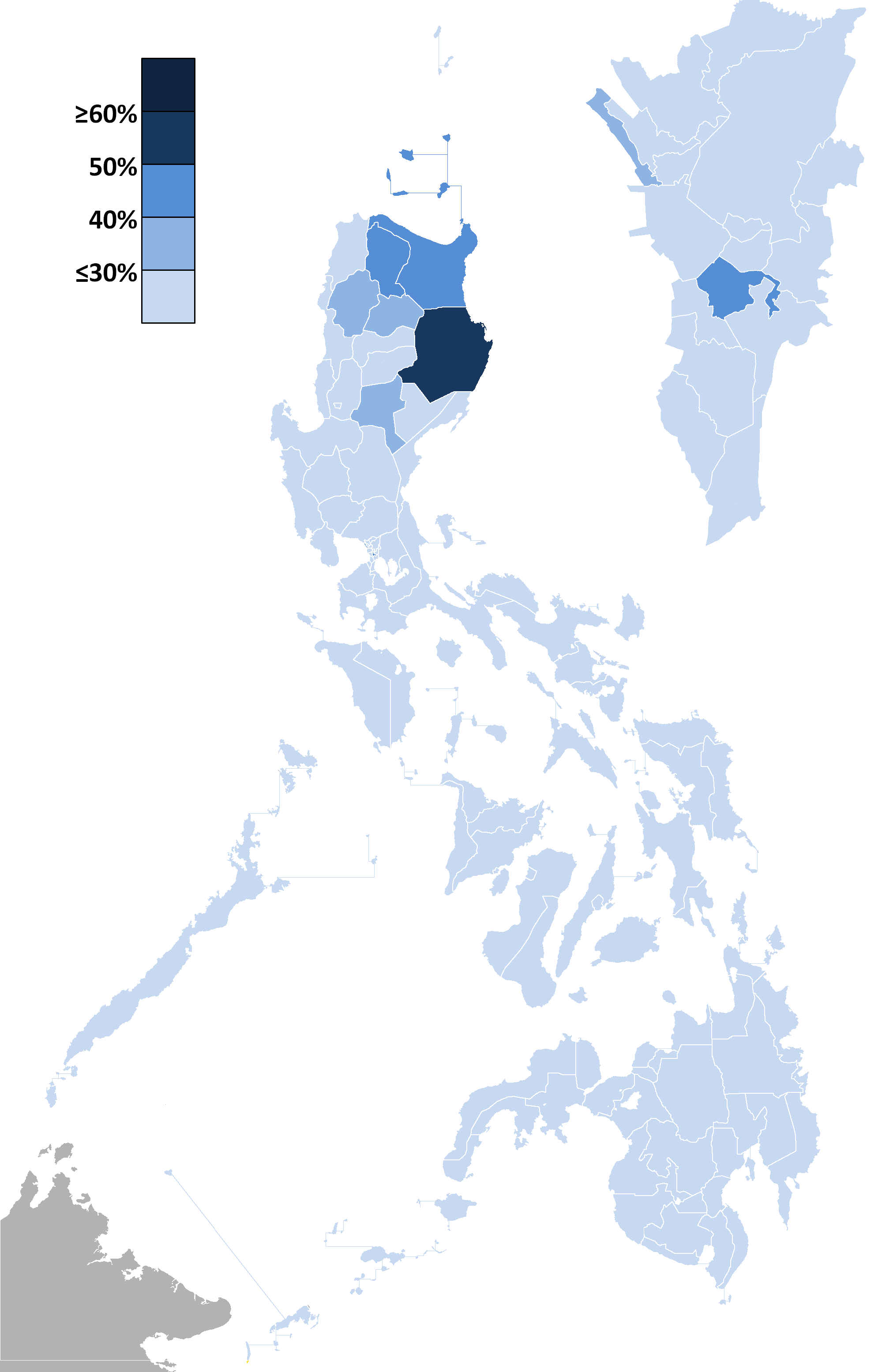
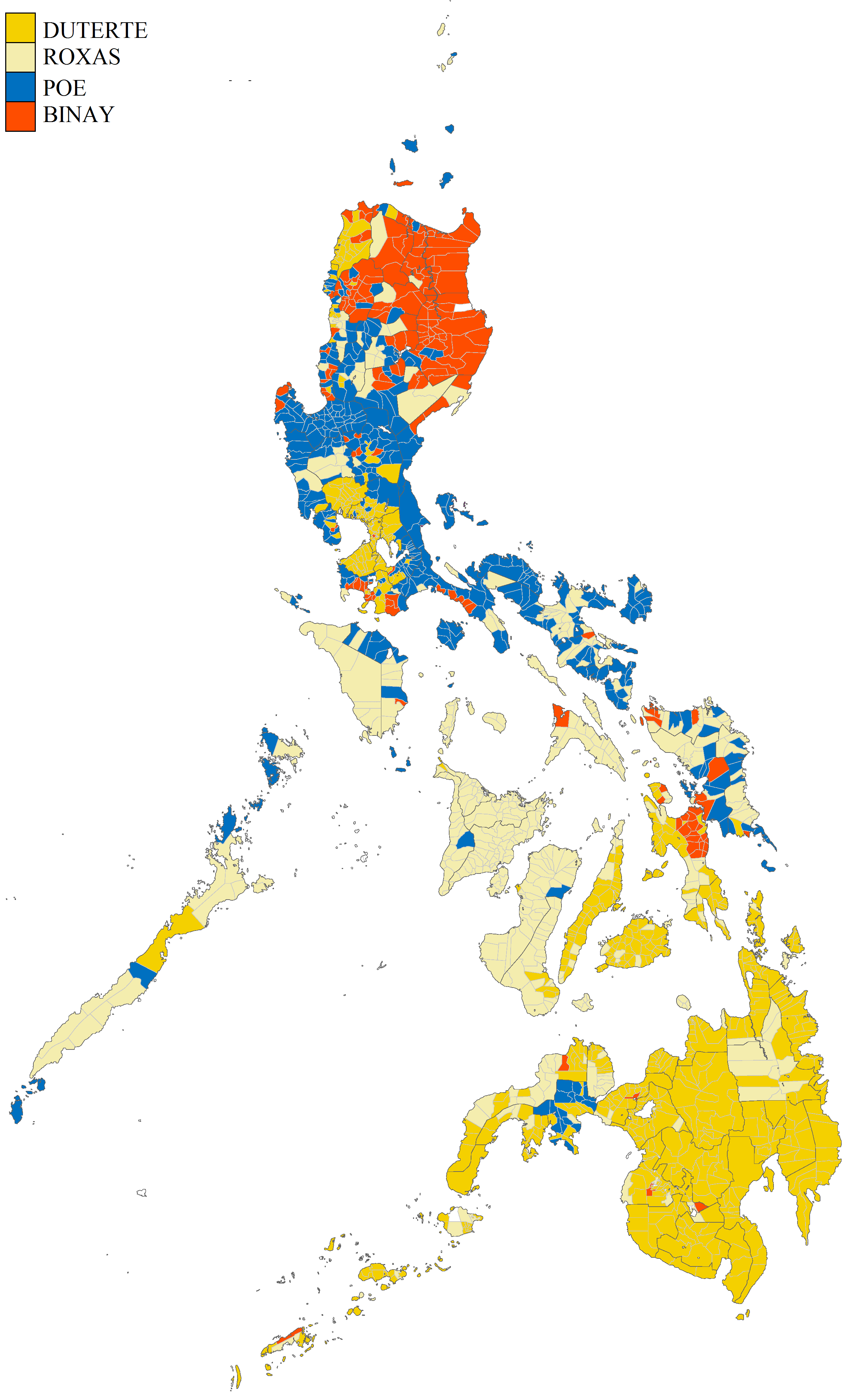
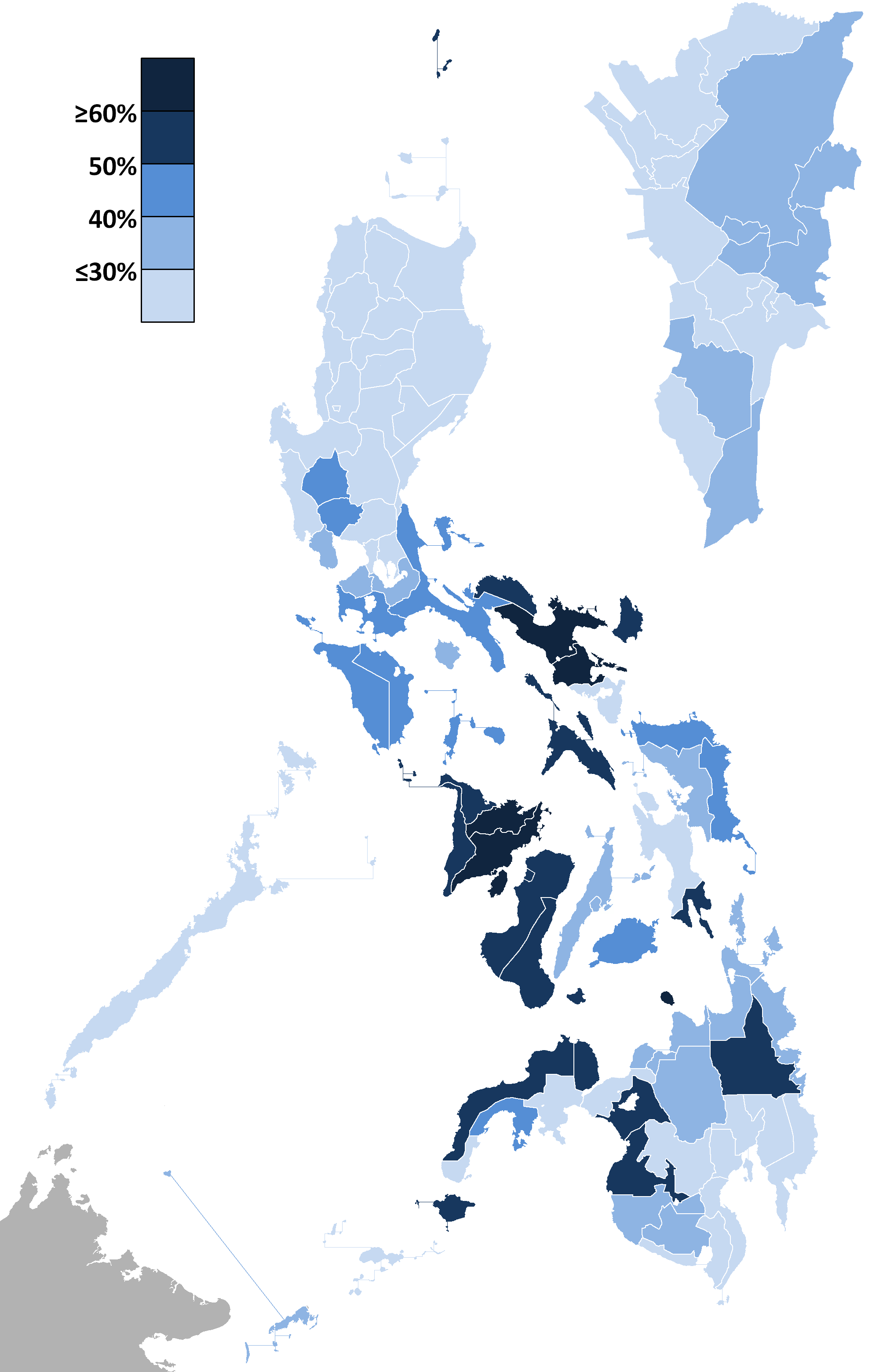
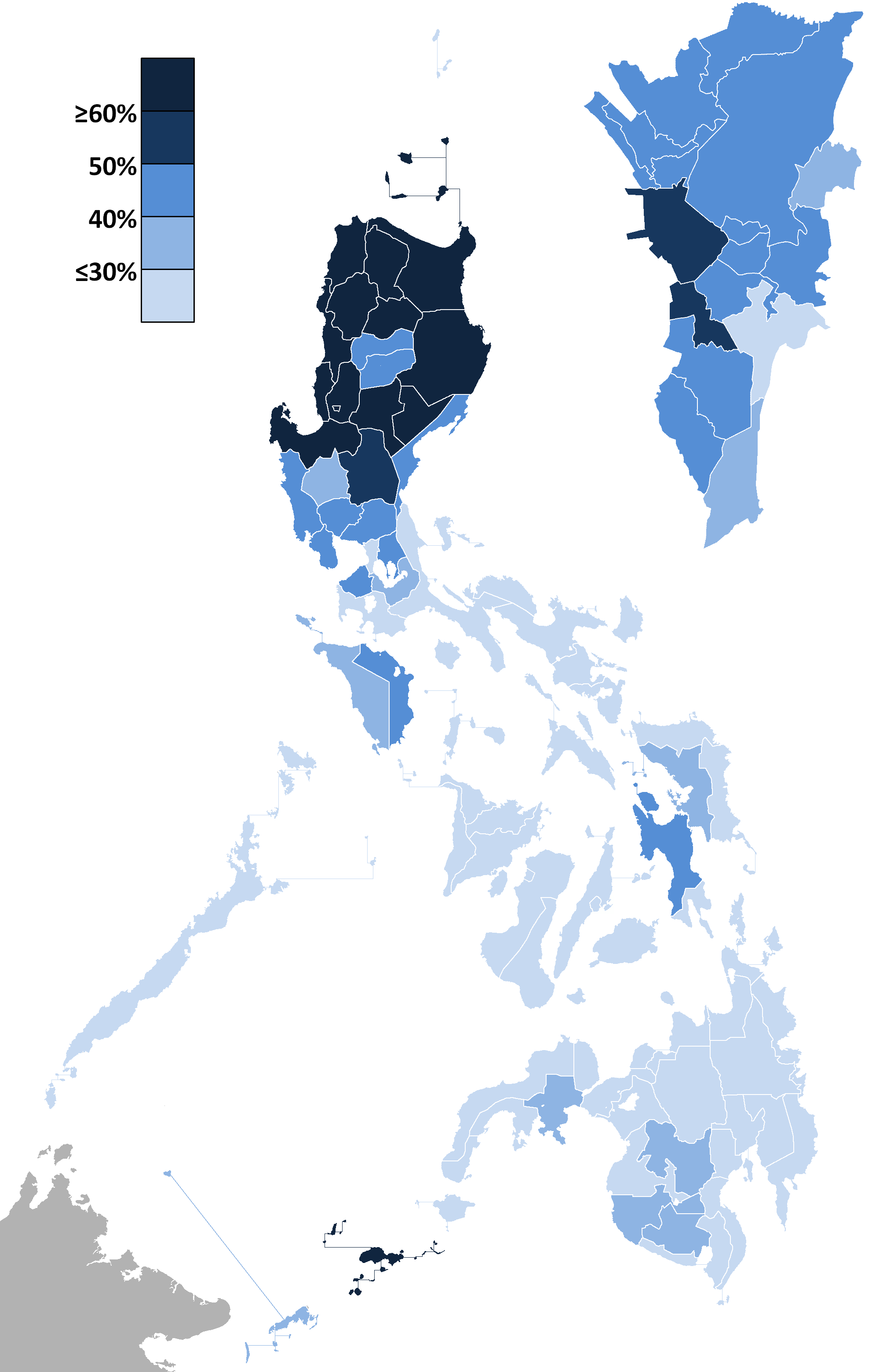
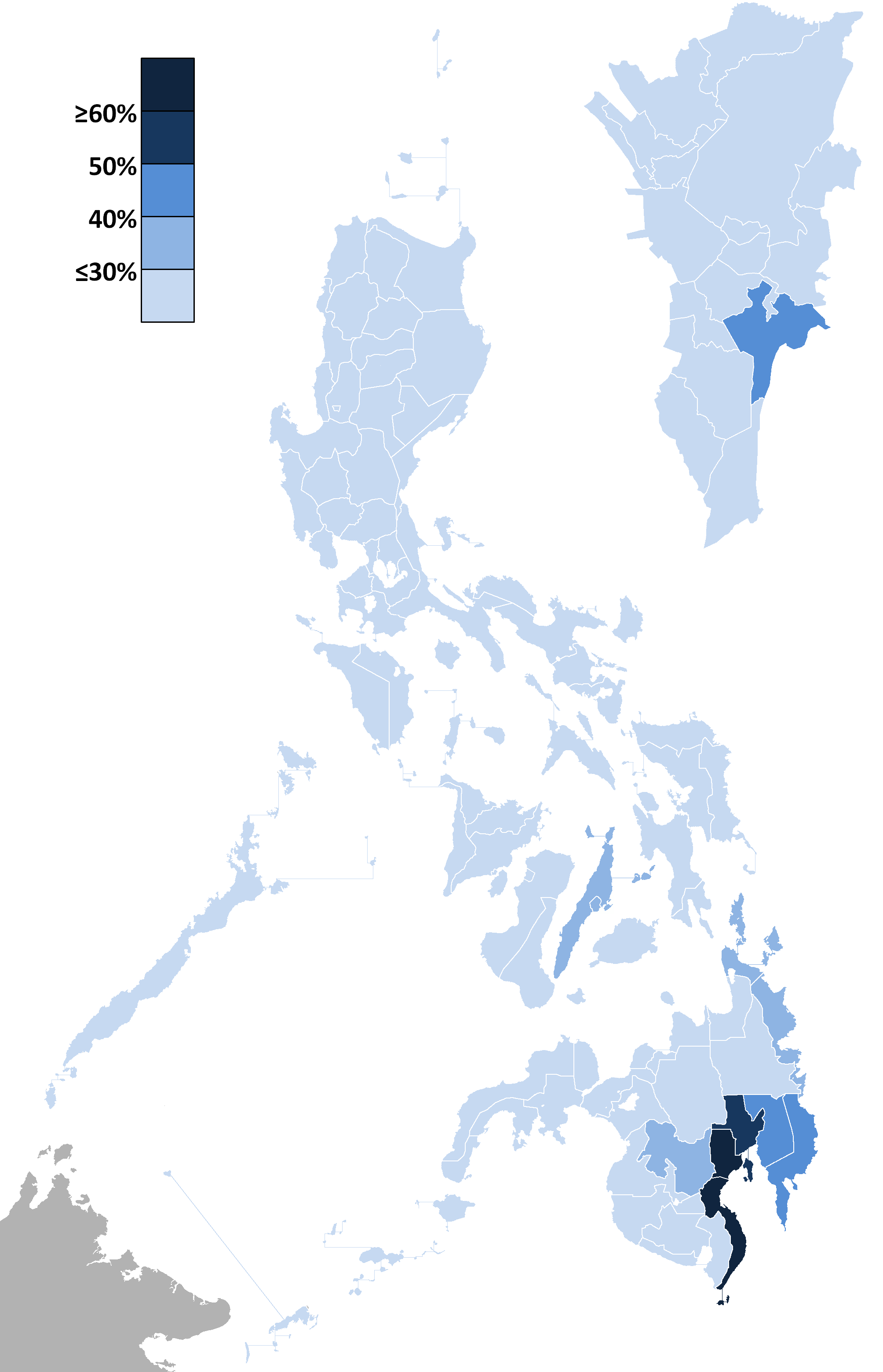
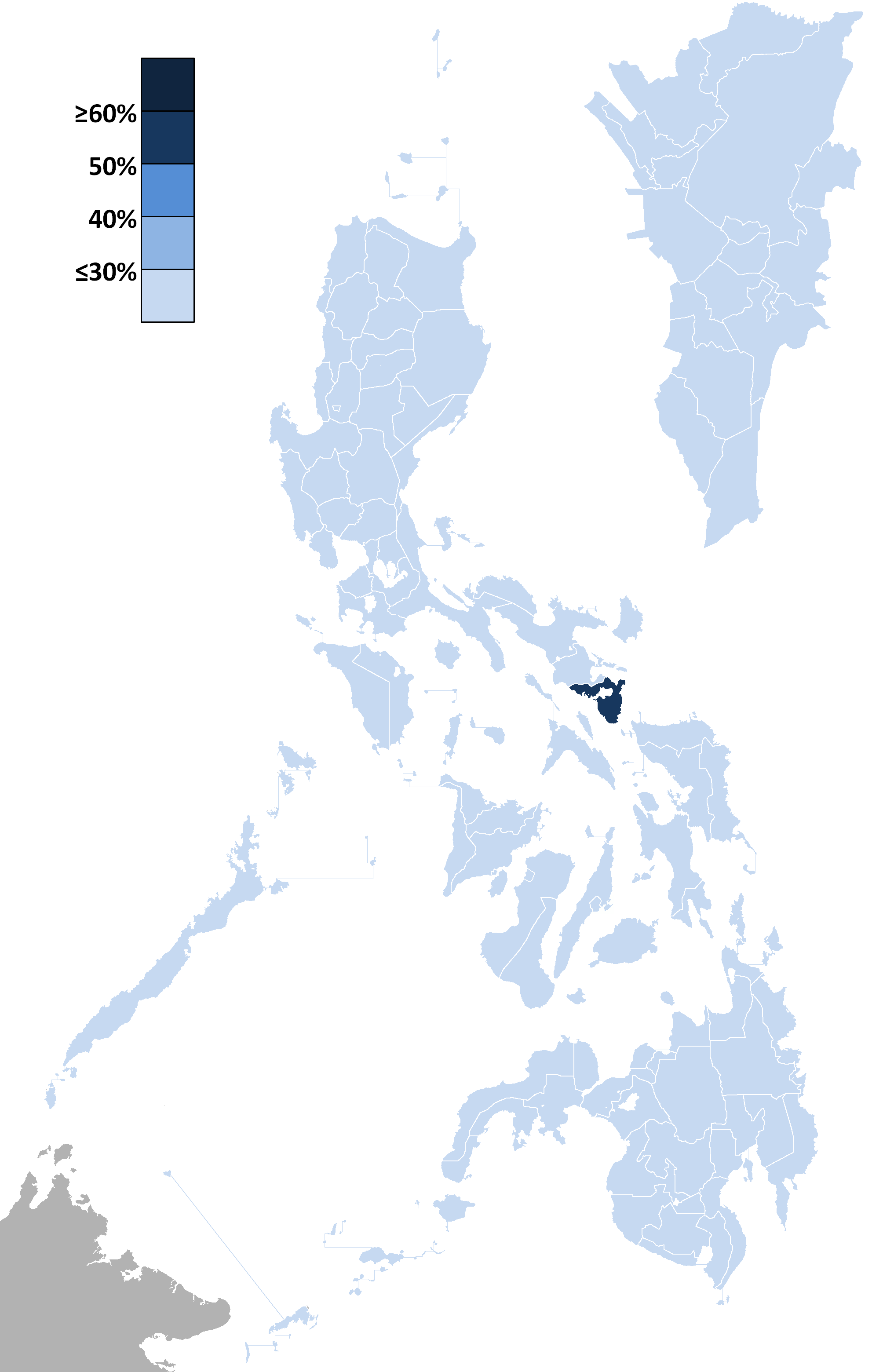
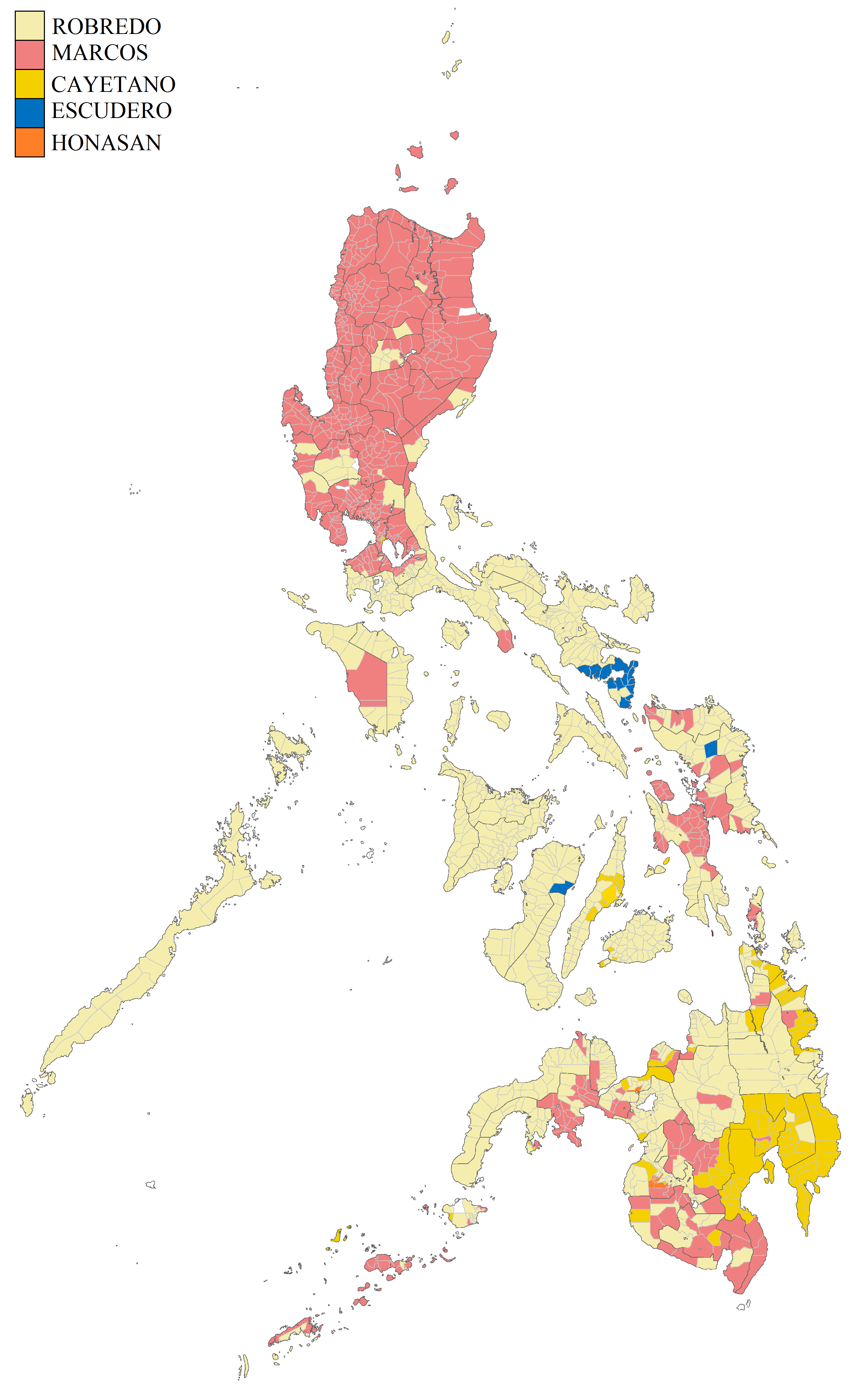
Percentage of the vote won by each candidate per province and city.				Municipal level breakdown
Duterte	Roxas	Poe	Binay	Municipal breakdown
Robredo	Marcos	Cayetano	Escudero	Municipal breakdown

==== Close provinces and cities ====
Margin of victory is less than 5% for the presidential election:

- Albay: 0.03% (Roxas win)
- Oriental Mindoro: 0.06% (Poe win)
- Zamboanga del Norte: 0.10% (Roxas win)
- Ifugao: 0.20% (Poe win)
- Batangas: 0.21% (Duterte win)
- Bataan: 0.34% (Duterte win)
- Nueva Vizcaya: 0.88% (Poe win)
- Ilocos Sur: 1.05% (Poe win)
- La Union: 1.27% (Poe win)
- Navotas: 1.46% (Duterte win)
- Tarlac: 1.50% (Roxas win)
- Zamboanga del Sur: 2.15% (Poe win)
- Quirino: 2.52% (Binay win)
- Eastern Samar: 3.46% (Roxas win)
- Samar: 3.68% (Roxas win)
- Camarines Sur: 3.7% (Roxas win)
- Mountain Province: 4.86% (Poe win)

Margin of victory is less than 5% for the vice presidential election:

- Surigao del Sur: 0.01% (Cayetano wins by 16 votes)
- Davao Occidental: 0.45% (Cayetano win)
- Lanao del Norte: 0.52% (Robredo win)
- Cebu City: 1.05% (Cayetano win)
- Samar: 1.24% (Robredo win)
- Cagayan de Oro: 1.38% (Marcos win)
- Marikina: 1.68% (Marcos win)
- Parañaque: 2.26% (Marcos win)
- Zamboanga City: 2.39% (Robredo win)
- South Cotabato: 2.51% (Marcos win)
- Cotabato: 2.95% (Marcos win)
- Laguna: 4.07% (Marcos win)
- Tarlac: 4.99% (Robredo win)

==== Landslides ====
Margin of victory is more than 50% for the presidential election:

- Davao City: 95.18% (Duterte wins in his home city)
- Davao del Norte: 89.35% (Duterte win)
- Davao del Sur: 87.28% (Duterte win)
- Davao Occidental: 80.73% (Duterte win)
- Davao Oriental: 73.86% (Duterte win)
- Lanao del Sur: 68.31% (Duterte win)
- Capiz: 66.97% (Roxas wins in his home province)
- Sulu: 66.45% (Duterte win)
- Cotabato: 62.26% (Duterte win)
- Compostela Valley: 59.73% (Duterte win)
- Absentee voters: 59.59% (Duterte win)
- Iligan: 57.56% (Duterte win)
- Sarangani: 54.64% (Duterte win)
- Bukidnon: 53.93% (Duterte win)
- Cagayan de Oro: 52.70% (Duterte win)
- Camiguin: 50.73% (Roxas win)

Margin of victory is more than 50% for the vice presidential election:

- Ilocos Norte: 95.62% (Marcos wins in his home province)
- Ilocos Sur: 88.89% (Marcos win)
- Abra: 84.92% (Marcos win)
- La Union: 84.57% (Marcos win)
- Camarines Sur: 80.26% (Robredo wins in her home province)
- Apayao: 79.45% (Marcos win)
- Camiguin: 69.68% (Robredo win)
- Capiz: 69.68% (Robredo win)
- Cagayan: 67.60% (Marcos win)
- Isabela: 61.96% (Marcos win)
- Guimaras: 58.57% (Robredo win)
- Iloilo: 57.25% (Robredo win)
- Kalinga: 56.63% (Marcos win)
- Davao City: 52.39% (Cayetano win)
- Nueva Vizcaya: 51.20% (Marcos win)

=== Unofficial tallies ===
Prior to the canvassing by Congress, other groups such as the media and non-governmental organizations may issue their own separate tallies.

2016 Philippine presidential election, COMELEC transparency server
Candidate	Party	Votes
Rodrigo Duterte	PDP–Laban	15,970,018
Mar Roxas	Liberal	9,700,382
Grace Poe	Independent	8,935,733
Jejomar Binay	UNA	5,318,249
Miriam Defensor Santiago	PRP	1,424,520
Roy Señeres	PMM	25,161
Turnout		43,716,817
Registered voters		55,739,911
Clustered precincts reporting		90,635 of 94,276
As of May 18, 2016, 7:45 PM Philippine Standard Time

2016 Philippine vice presidential election, COMELEC transparency server
Candidate	Party	Votes
Leni Robredo	Liberal	14,023,093
Bongbong Marcos	Independent	13,803,966
Alan Peter Cayetano	Independent	5,679,102
Francis Escudero	Independent	4,812,375
Antonio Trillanes	Independent	844,157
Gregorio Honasan	UNA	760,409
Turnout		43,716,817
Registered voters		55,739,911
Clustered precincts reporting		90,635 of 94,276
As of May 18, 2016, 7:45 PM Philippine Standard Time

=== Voter demographics ===
These were the results of the Social Weather Stations' exit poll:

Demographic subgroup	Duterte	Roxas	Poe	Binay	Defensor Santiago
Socio-economic class
Class ABC (upper class and middle class)	45.9%	18.9%	16.4%	11.8%	6.2%
Class D (working class)	39.6%	22.7%	20.6%	13.9%	2.5%
Class E (underclass)	35.3%	28.6%	19%	15%	1.3%
Educational attainment
College graduate	49.2%	19.8%	13.4%	10%	6.7%
Some high school	33.8%	25.7%	22.1%	16.1%	1.5%

According to Mahar Mangahas, the president of SWS, voters who belonged to a higher social class, was more educated, younger, Muslim, a member of the Iglesia ni Cristo, from urban areas, and men tended to support Duterte. Duterte had less support from Catholics, from rural voters, and from women. De La Salle University political science professor Julio Teehankee described it as the middle class' emergence of a "counter-elite challenging the old elite," with Duterte voters being seen as "who are taxed the most and financing Daang Matuwid. They are working hard for their families and the country and yet they are the ones who suffer from lack of public service, land and air traffic. Breakdown of peace and order corruption, laglag-bala. The poor have their conditional cash transfer fund. The rich have their PPPs."
