= Ninoy Aquino International Airport bullet-planting scandal =

Political controversy in the Philippines

The Ninoy Aquino International Airport bullet-planting scandal, colloquially known as tanim-bala ("bullet planting") or laglag-bala ("bullet dropping"), was a scandal in the Philippines that began in September 2015 and lasted until early 2016, involving allegations that airport security personnel at Ninoy Aquino International Airport (NAIA) in Metro Manila planted bullets in the luggage of passengers to extort money from them. Victims of the alleged plot were generally Overseas Filipino Workers, but also included non-Filipinos such as foreign tourists.

According to the Philippine National Police Aviation Security Group (PNP-AVSEGROUP), at least thirty cases of the scheme were recorded in 2015, while the Manila International Airport Authority (MIAA) recorded only five such incidents. The government denied it was responsible for the scheme.

== Bullet planting ==
The scandal became known on September 17, 2015, when a 20-year-old American missionary, Lane Michael White, accused the airport's personnel of extorting ₱30,000 from him after finding a bullet in his baggage. White, who was headed to Palawan, spent six days at the airport police facility and was freed after posting a ₱40,000 bail. This was followed by similar incidents involving Filipino and foreign passengers who were only freed after they posted bail amounts of up to ₱80,000. In some instances, when the passengers were arrested, they refused to pay any penalties because they denied bringing the bullets. The passengers were freed only on the condition that they sign the logbook. The bullet-planting scheme targeted passengers as old as 60, including tourists.

President Benigno Aquino III (son of Ninoy Aquino after whom the airport is named) then ordered the Department of Transportation and Communications to investigate the alleged scheme. The National Bureau of Investigation (NBI) later confirmed that an extortion syndicate was behind the bullet-planting scheme, based on their initial findings. According to the NBI's investigation, some porters were involved in identifying potential victims for the bullet-planting scam. Allegedly, airport officials in the security and immigration services present in the four terminals of the airport then pursued target victims after their identification by porters. The usual victims were the elderly and Overseas Filipino Workers (OFWs).

== Subsequent developments ==
On November 6, 2015, Labor and Employment Secretary Rosalinda Baldoz announced the creation of an inter-agency team tasked to monitor and assist OFW victims of the bullet planting scam. The inter-agency team was to be composed of representatives from the Department of Labor and Employment, the Philippine Overseas Employment Administration, and the Overseas Workers Welfare Administration, among others; the team would coordinate with the MIAA, the PNP-AVSEGROUP, the Office for Transportation Security, the NBI, and the Department of Justice.

In a GMA News Online report published on November 24, a memo from the Office for Transportation Security (OTS) dated June 3, 2015, showed that the OTS has a cash reward policy for finding contraband items such as weapons and explosives at security checkpoints, providing for rewards of up to ₱1,000 for explosives, weapons, "stunning devices" and dangerous drugs found by OTS personnel or Security Screening Officers (SSOs). Transport Security Risk Management Bureau assistant administrative director Roberto Almadin confirmed the existence of the memo, but he said only two to three people had been given rewards. He also asked the public to disassociate the memo from the laglag-bala extortion scheme. The memo, signed by OTS administrator Roland Recomono, also stated that the rewards were instituted "to boost the welfare and morale of OTS personnel". A later memo dated July 8 had a revision of the category list, indicating that OTS personnel could claim rewards for a single piece of explosive and for every five pieces of ammunition found per month. Spocky Farolan, the legal counsel of an overseas Filipino worker who almost lost her job due to the alleged scheme, said the memo's lack of publicity could make the public more suspicious of the agency. The following day, the MIAA installed disposal booths at NAIA to give passengers a chance to rid their bags of banned items.

On July 6, 2016, newly elected President Rodrigo Duterte ordered new Aviation Security Group chief Mao Aplasca to its personnel that passengers caught with bullets would no longer be arrested. They would just need to undergo profiling, and could immediately board their flight after being cleared. "We assure the public that tanim-bala is already a thing of the past. We will not condone any act contrary to the directive given to us by no less than President Duterte,” NAIA stated. MIAA added, "Passengers found to have bullets or bullet-like items in their bags are now allowed to take their flight after proper logging of the incident. Prohibited items like bullets or ammunition whether as amulets or for any purpose are subject for confiscation."

=== Complaint by Lane Michael White ===
On November 25, the camp of American national Lane Michael White expressed disappointment in the Philippines' justice system, which they perceived to be slow in resolving their laglag-bala case. White's camp expected the court to junk the case that day; a counter-motion from former Office for Transportation Security screeners prevented this. "Every time we come in here we're expecting it to be dismissed and it just keeps getting kicked down the road so I don't know. We have hope in the Lord but our hope in the court system here is fading fast," White's father, Ryan, was quoted as saying in a report from 24 Oras. White said his son was already feeling ill due to the stress he was facing from repeatedly having to attend court hearings. He also said they were not pleased with President Aquino's recent statement on the incidence of lagla-bala at NAIA. "If this is just a few random bandits running around and extorting people, this would have been squashed long ago. But the fact that it is still going on means that the entire airport is corrupt," he said. His son Lane Michael White was alleged to have had a bullet in his luggage when he checked through NAIA last September, possession of which is a crime in Philippine law. White's camp was reported to be holding out hope that their case would be resolved the following week.

On December 10, 2015, the Philippines' National Bureau of Investigation (NBI) pressed charges against OTS employees and PNP-AVSEGROUP officers for allegedly trying to extort money from Lane Michael White. The money allegedly asked amounted to ₱30,000. They faced charges for Violations of Article V, Section 38 (Liability for Planting Evidence) of Republic Act (RA) No. 10591 (the Comprehensive Firearms and Ammunition Regulation Act); robbery/extortion; and violations of RA No. 7438 and RA No. 3019. The Department of Justice dismissed the criminal complaints against the employees in June 2016 due to insufficient proof of evidence that they planted the bullets.

== Reactions ==
=== Politicians ===
On October 31, 2015, Senator Miriam Defensor Santiago filed a resolution at the Senate calling for the creation of a task force to tackle the issue. On the same day, Senator Alan Peter Cayetano called for the resignation of airport officials if they would not determine and catch those responsible for the bullet planting incidents within 48 hours. Mayor Rodrigo Duterte of Davao City, a presumptive presidential candidate in the 2016 Philippine presidential election, further alleged that a syndicate is behind the series of incidents. Duterte said the operation had been going on for more than two years.

In October 2021, six years after the scheme was first reported, former senator Antonio Trillanes claimed that the left-wing Makabayan group was responsible for the laglag-bala operation with an intention to discredit President Aquino's administration. The controversy had been one of the issues in the 2016 elections; Duterte, who was elected to succeed Aquino, said that his disappointment over the government's failure to handle the issue prompted him to run for president.

=== Aquino administration ===
On November 4, former Interior and Local Government Secretary Mar Roxas, who was the administration's presidential candidate for the 2016 elections, defended the government over the controversy, stating that bullet carriers have to take responsibility, saying: "If you enter the airport with contraband, then how does that become the government's problem?" He further stated that government data showed these cases mostly involved tourists coming from shooting ranges and had bullets for souvenirs. He told reporters that extorting money from people was inconsistent with the administration's Daang Matuwid (Straight Path) policy. During a press briefing at NAIA earlier that day, transportation officials said 6,000 similar cases had been recorded since 2012.

On November 23, during a coffee meeting with reporters at the sidelines of the ASEAN Summit in Kuala Lumpur, President Aquino said that the statistics presented to him did not necessarily add up to the possibility that an extortion racket exists inside NAIA. He said that the controversy on the supposed laglag-bala extortion racket in airports had been "sensationalized" and used by certain groups to put his administration in a bad light. He expressed sympathy toward "innocent airport employees" who had been affected by the controversy.

=== Internet ===
There was a public outcry among Filipinos on social media. An online petition decrying the incident was started with about 12,000 people signing the petition as of October 31, 2015. Internet memes also spread on Facebook against the government and Roxas for their downplaying, and/or denying, the laglag-bala scheme as a problem. One meme also pointed out the MIAA chairman's (retired major general Jose Angel Honrado's) being a cousin of President Aquino and the Department of Transportation and Communication secretary's (Jun Abaya's) being a great-grandchild of turn-of-the-20th-century revolutionary Emilio Aguinaldo (depicted in the 2015 historical epic Heneral Luna as a possible traitor).

=== International ===
A Japanese TV show satirically re-enacted the scandal, showing the theory of how the NAIA personnel may have supposedly planted bullets in travelers' bags. The host explained that the personnel would plant the bullets in the travelers' bags at airport security. Upon finding the bullets through the baggage x-ray machine, the personnel would open the bag to retrieve the bullets and offer the victim a fine to skip questioning and detention. It then showed footage of bags being wrapped in plastic.

Hong Kong news sites Hong Kong Free Press and The Standard published their own reports over the laglag-bala scheme. On November 4, 2015, Fox News anchor Greta Van Susteren on her program On the Record criticized Filipino airport authorities allegedly involved in the extortion scheme. She also said in a Facebook post, "The Philippines may get mad at me, but this airport bullet planting scam deserves to be called out!".

=== Other ===
The mobile game application launched by Kulit Games and Mesocyclone Studios, entitled Tanim Bala, was inspired by the NAIA bullet planting scheme.
