= Opinion polling for the 2016 Philippine presidential election =

Opinion polling, locally known as surveys, in the 2016 Philippine presidential and vice presidential elections is conducted by Social Weather Stations (SWS), Pulse Asia, and other pollsters. The last electoral votes were cast on Monday, May 9, 2016.

As the positions of president and vice president are elected separately, pollsters usually have separate surveys for each position.

The figure representing the polling numbers for the candidate that topped each poll is emboldened unless two or more candidates tied, when they are all emboldened. Those figures which are within the margin of error are italicized.

== Calendar ==
- Filing of candidacies: October 12 to 16, 2015
- Campaign period for candidates for president, vice president, senators and party-list representatives: February 9 to May 7, 2016
- Campaign period for local positions and district representatives: March 26 to May 7, 2016
- Casting of ballots for local absentee voters: April 27 to 29, 2016
- Election day: May 9, 2016

== Polling for president ==
=== Graphical summary ===
View source data.

=== From the start of the campaign period to Election Day ===
Polling firm	Fieldwork date	Sample size	MoE	Binay UNA	Poe Ind	Duterte PDP-Laban	Roxas LP	Santiago PRP	Refused	Don't know	Undecided / None
Election results	May 9, 2016	44,979,151	N/A	12.73	21.31	39.02	23.45	3.42	N/A		
SWS	Exit poll	45,123	N/A	13.5	19.2	39.3	24.0	3.1	N/A		
D' Strafford	May 1–5, 2016	4,000	±1.2%	16.6	22.5	25.4	30.5	3	–	0.3	1.7
SWS	May 1–3, 2016	4,500	±1.0%	13	22	33	20	2	–	6	4
Argus	Apr 28–30, 2016	6,000	±1.9%	19	27	31	19	4	–	–	–
Standard	Apr 27-May 1, 2016	3,000	±1.8%	15	25	32	22	2	–	–	4
Antonio Trillanes' exposé on Rodrigo Duterte's alleged multimillion peso bank accounts and properties (April 27).
Pulse Asia	Apr 26–29, 2016	4,000	±1.5%	17	21	33	22	2	–	–	5
D' Strafford	Apr 25–29, 2016	4,500	±1.2%	17	24	25	28	3	–	–	1
The Center	Apr 23–29, 2016	1,800	±2.5%	23	25	29	21	2	–	–	–
Third presidential debate in Dagupan (April 24).
Pulse Asia	Apr 19–24, 2016	4,000	±1.5%	18	22	33	20	2	–	–	5
SWS	Apr 18–20, 2016	1,800	±2%	14	24	33	19	2	–	5	3
Rodrigo Duterte makes a joke about a murdered and raped Australian kidnap victim in a campaign rally (April 17).
Pulse Asia	Apr 16–20, 2016	1,800	±2.3%	16	23	35	17	2	0.3	–	5
D' Strafford	Apr 13–18, 2016	2,800	±1.9%	19	26	20	26	4	–	–	4
Pulse Asia	Apr 12–17, 2016	4,000	±1.5%	19	22	34	18	2	1	3	4
The Center	Apr 11–16, 2016	1,800	±2.5%	23.25	26.25	26.75	20.75	2	–	–	1
The Supreme Court declares their vote on Grace Poe's natural-born status and 10-year residency is final and executory, and she is eligible to the presidency (April 9).
Pulse Asia	Apr 5–10, 2016	4,000	±1.5%	20	25	32	18	1	1	2	1
The Center	Apr 1–7, 2016	1,800	±2.5%	22	25	29	19	2	–	–	2.3
Pulse Asia	Mar 29–Apr 3, 2016	4,000	±1.5%	20	25	30	19	2	–	–	4
MBC–DZRH	Apr 2, 2016	7,490	±1.13%	15.3	28.2	36	15.2	3.5	–	–	1.8
SWS	Mar 30–Apr 2, 2016	1,500	±3%	20	23	27	18	3	–	–	–
Standard	Mar 26–Apr 1, 2016	3,000	±1.8%	18	27	30	21	2	–	–	2
Second presidential debate in Cebu City (March 20).
Pulse Asia	Mar 15–20, 2016	4,000	±1.5%	23	28	24	19	2	–	–	4
Pulse Asia	Mar 8–13, 2016	4,000	±1.5%	22	26	25	20	3	–	–	5
The Supreme Court affirms Grace Poe's natural-born status and declares she is qualified to run (March 8).
SWS	Mar 4–7, 2016	1,800	±2%	24	27	21	22	4	–	–	1
Pulse Asia	Mar 1–6, 2016	2,600	±1.9%	21	28	24	20	3	–	–	6
Standard	Feb 24–Mar 1, 2016	3,000	±1.8%	23	26	24	22	2	–	–	4
Pulse Asia	Feb 23–27, 2016	2,600	±1.9%	22	25	23	20	3	–	–	–
Pulse Asia	Feb 16–27, 2016	5,200	±1.4%	24	26	22	19	3	2	2	2
First presidential debate in Cagayan de Oro (February 21).
Pulse Asia	Feb 15–20, 2016	1,800	±2%	25	26	21	21	3	–	–	4
MBC–DZRH	Feb 13, 2016	7,572	±1.13%	23.2	27	26.4	19	3.9	–	–	2.3

=== From the end of candidacy filing to the start of the campaign period ===
Polling firm	Fieldwork date	Sample size	MoE	Binay UNA	Poe Ind	Duterte PDP-Laban	Roxas LP	Santiago PRP	David AK	Sabio Ind	Señeres PMM	Syjuco Ind	Others	Refused	Don't know	None
2016
SWS	Feb 5-7, 2016	1,200	±3%	29	24	24	18	4	–	–	–	–	–	–	–	2
Standard	Jan 27-Feb 4, 2016	3,000	±1.8%	22	29	20	22	2	–	–	–	–	–	–	–	4
Pulse Asia	Jan 24–28, 2016	1,200	±3%	23	30	20	20	4	–	–	–	–	0.1	0.4	1	1
SWS	Jan 8–10, 2016	1,800	±2%	31	24	20	21	3	–	0	0.1	–	0	2		
RMN	Jan 5-14, 2016	3,578	±2.5%	21.49	28.59	27.86	15.12	5.14	–	–	–	–	–	–	–	1.79
2015
SWS	Dec 12–14, 2015	1,200	±3%	26	26	20	22	4	0.1	0.04	0	0	0.1	1		
Standard	Dec 4–12, 2015	1,800	±2%	23	28	19	22	3	–	–	–	–	0.1	–	–	4
Pulse Asia	Dec 4–11, 2015	1,500	±2.6%	33	21	23	21	4	–	0.1	0	0	–	0.3	1	1
MBC–DZRH	Nov 27, 2015	7,436	±1.14%	18.63	25.14	30.25	14.92	6.22	0.21	0.08	0.31	0.10	2.23	–	–	1.92
RMN	Oct 25-Nov 5, 2015	3,604	±2.5%	22.95	37.15	–	19.64	11.74	–	–	–	–	–	–	–	8.52

=== Until candidacy filing ended on 16 October 2015 ===
==== Single-choice surveys ====
Polling firm	Fieldwork date	Sample size	MoE	Binay UNA	Poe Ind	Duterte PDP-Laban	Roxas LP	Santiago PRP	Estrada PMP	Escudero Ind	Cayetano Ind	Marcos Ind	Gordon Bagumbayan	Drilon LP	Lacson Ind	Legarda NPC	Revilla Lakas	Teodoro Ind	Others	Refused	Don't know	None
2015
Pulse Asia	Sep 8–15, 2015	2,400	±2%	19	26	16	20	3	5	–	1	–	–	–	2	6	–	–	0.6% Bello (Ind): 0.1% Others: 0.5%	3		
SWS	Sep 2–5, 2015	1,200	±3%	24	26	11	20	12	3	4	0.8	4	–	–	8	0.8	–	8	3% Villar (NP): 1% Others/Refused/Don't know/None:2%			
Pulse Asia	Aug 27–Sep 3, 2015	1,200	±3%	21	27	15	18	4	5	–	1	5	–	–	1	–	–	–	–			
RMN	Aug 11–18, 2015	4,718	±2.5%	26.16	24.84	12.42	18.14	4.33	6	–	1.9	0.06	–	–	1.83	–	–	–	–			
Pulse Asia	May 30–Jun 5, 2015	1,200	±3%	22	30	15	10	6	10	–	2	–	–	–	2	–	–	–	Others: 1%	1	0.4	1
Laylo	May 8–18, 2015	1,500	±2.6%	28	24	10	8	8	10	4	3	3	–	–	1	–	–	–	–			
IBON	May 13–23, 2015	1,496	±3%	13.8	13.7	7.6	3.8	–	–	–	–	–	–	–	–	–	–	–	15.0% B. Aquino (LP) 4.2% Others: 10.8%	–		46.1
Pulse Asia	Mar 1–7, 2015	1,200	±3%	29	14	12	4	9	12	4	3	6	1	–	1	–	–	–	3% Trillanes (Ind): 2% Others: 1%	1	0.1	2
2014																						
Pulse Asia	Nov 14–20, 2014	1,200	±3%	26	18	–	6	12	10	7	3	4	1	2	3	–	1	1	3.4% Belmonte (LP): 0.4% Others: 3%	0.3	0.5	0.2
Pulse Asia	Sep 8–15, 2014	1,200	±3%	31	10	–	13	11	10	5	1	4	2	0.4	1	–	1	–	4% Castro (Ind): 3% Robredo (LP): 1%	–		
Pulse Asia	Jun 24–Jul 6, 2014	1,200	±3%	41	12	–	7	7	9	7	5	5	1	1	–	–	2	–	Others: 2%	1	0.5	1
Pulse Asia	Mar 19–26, 2014	1,200	±3%	40	15	–	6	10	–	9	4	5	–	–	2	–	3	–	5% K. Aquino (Ind): 4% Others: 1%	0.03	0.2	0.4

==== Three-choice surveys ====
These surveys asked participants to rank up to three candidates.

Polling firm	Fieldwork date	Sample size	MoE	Binay UNA	Poe Ind	Roxas LP	Duterte PDP-Laban	Santiago PRP	Estrada PMP	Escudero Ind	Cayetano Ind	Marcos Ind	Lacson Ind	Trillanes Ind	Revilla Lakas	Villar PN	Pacquiao UNA	Drilon LP	Legarda NPC	Pangilinan LP	Others	Don't know/refused	None
SWS	Sep 2–5, 2015	1,200	±3%	35	47	39	16	2	3	6	1	5	1	–	–	1	–	–	–	–	–	5	2
SWS	Jun 5–8, 2015	1,200	±3%	34	42	21	20	4	7	4	2	3	7	1	–	1	–	–	1	–	1	9	5
SWS	Mar 20–23, 2015	1,200	±3%	36	31	15	15	11	11	8	4	7	1	3	1	3	1	1	1	–	–	3	12
SWS	Nov 27–Dec 1, 2014	1,800	±2%	37	21	19	5	10	9	9	3	3	2	5	5	2	1	1	1	1	5	15	8

== Polling for vice president ==
=== Graphical summary ===
View source data.

=== From the start of the campaign period to Election Day ===
Polling firm	Fieldwork date	Sample size	MoE	Escudero Ind	Marcos Ind	Cayetano Ind	Robredo LP	Honasan UNA	Trillanes Ind	Refused	Don't know	Undecided / None
Election results	May 9, 2016	44,066,884	N/A	12.01	34.47	14.38	35.11	1.92	2.11	N/A		
SWS	Exit poll	45,123	N/A	11.0	34.6	14.9	32.8	2.5	2.1	N/A		
D' Strafford	May 1–5, 2016	4,000	±1.2%	18	25	17	35	1	3	–	–	1
SWS	May 1–3, 2016	4,500	±1.0%	15	29	13	28	3	3	–	–	9
Standard	Apr 27-May 1, 2016	3,000	±1.8%	20	30	12	29	3	3	–	–	3
Argus	Apr 28–30, 2016	6,000	±1.9%	22	33	13	24	4	4	–	–	–
D' Strafford	Apr 25–29, 2016	4,500	±1.2%	18	28	16	34	2	1	–	–	1
Pulse Asia	Apr 26–29, 2016	4,000	±1.5%	18	28	15	30	3	2	–	–	4
The Center	Apr 23–29, 2016	1,800	±2.5%	18	31	15	25	5	3	–	–	3
Pulse Asia	Apr 19–24, 2016	4,000	±1.5%	18	31	15	26	2	3	–	–	5
SWS	Apr 18–20, 2016	1,800	±2%	18	25	16	26	2	5	–	3	5
Second vice presidential debate in Quezon City (April 17).
Pulse Asia	Apr 16–20, 2016	1,800	±2.3%	18	29	16	24	4	3	0.7	–	7
D' Strafford	Apr 13–18, 2016	2,800	±1.9%	23	25	17	32	1	2	–	–	–
Pulse Asia	Apr 12–17, 2016	4,000	±1.5%	20	29	16	23	4	3	1	3	1
The Center	Apr 11–16, 2016	1,800	±2.5%	23	29	15	25	4	3	–	–	1
First vice presidential debate in Manila (April 10).
Pulse Asia	Apr 5–10, 2016	4,000	±1.5%	23	27	17	21	4	3	1	2	1
The Center	Apr 1–7, 2016	1,800	±2.5%	22.5	28.5	16	23.5	4.25	3.75	–	–	1.75
Pulse Asia	Mar 29–Apr 3, 2016	4,000	±1.5%	21	28	15	22	4	5	–	–	5
MBC– DZRH	Apr 2, 2016	7,490	±1.13%	22.6	29.8	18.4	17.8	4.3	5.5	–	–	1.6
SWS	Mar 30–Apr 2, 2016	1,500	±3%	21	26	13	19	5	5	–	–	–
Standard	Mar 26–Apr 1, 2016	3,000	±1.8%	28	25	15	21	3	5	–	–	4
Pulse Asia	Mar 15-20, 2016	4,000	±1.5%	25	25	14	21	5	4	–	–	5
Pulse Asia	Mar 8-13, 2016	4,000	±1.5%	24	25	13	20	5	6	–	–	6
SWS	Mar 4-7, 2016	1,800	±2%	28	26	11	24	5	6	–	–	2
Pulse Asia	Mar 1-6, 2016	2,600	±1.9%	25	22	14	21	5	6	–	–	6
Standard	Feb 24-Mar 1, 2016	3,000	±1.8%	30	24	11	20	4	7	–	–	5
Pulse Asia	Feb 23-27, 2016	2,600	±1.9%	25	26	12	21	6	4	–	–	–
Pulse Asia	Feb 16-27, 2016	5,200	±1.4%	26	26	13	18	6	5	2	2	2
MBC– DZRH	Feb 13, 2016	7,572	±1.13%	26.8	25.1	14.8	18.8	5.5	6.2	–	–	2.7
Pulse Asia	Feb 15-20, 2016	1,800	±2%	29	26	12	19	4	6	–	–	3

=== From the end of candidacy filing to the start of the campaign period ===
Polling firm	Fieldwork date	Sample size	MoE	Escudero Ind	Marcos NP–Ind	Cayetano NP–Ind	Robredo LP	Honasan UNA	Trillanes NP–Ind	Alba AK	Others	Refused	Don't know	None
2016
SWS	Feb 5-7, 2016	1,200	±3%	26	26	16	19	6	5	–	–	–	–	2
Standard	Jan 27-Feb 4, 2016	3,000	±1.8%	31	25	15	20	5	4	–	–	–	–	–
Pulse Asia	Jan 24–28, 2016	1,200	±3%	33	23	14	18	5	4	–	–	0.3	1	2
SWS	Jan 8–10, 2016	1,800	±2%	28	25	14	17	8	3	1	2.3	2		
RMN	Jan 5-14, 2016	3,578	±2.5%	32.14	21.60	17.36	14.06	6.32	6.01	–	–	–	–	2.52
2015
SWS	Dec 12–14, 2015	1,200	±3%	30	19	17	14	8	5	0.8	0.64	1		
Standard	Dec 4–12, 2015	1,800	±2%	33	19	18	19	6	7	–	–	–	–	5
Pulse Asia	Dec 4–11, 2015	1,500	±2.6%	29	23	18	11	9	4	0.3	0.34	0.1	1	1
MBC– DZRH	Nov 27, 2015	7,436	±1.14%	28.49	24.62	18.25	12.53	6.11	7.75	–	–	–	–	2.25
RMN	Oct 25-Nov 5, 2015	3,604	±2.5%	38.10	18.70	11.90	13.65	5.94	5.38	–	–	–	–	6.33

=== Until candidacy filing ended on 16 October 2015 ===
Polling firm	Fieldwork date	Sample size	MoE	Poe Ind	Escudero Ind	Cayetano Ind	Duterte PDP-Laban	Marcos Ind	Binay UNA	Santiago PRP	Drilon LP	Ji. Estrada UNA	Jo. Estrada PMP	Lacson Ind	Legarda NPC	Revilla Lakas	Robredo LP	Roxas LP	Santos LP	Trillanes Ind	Others	Refused	Don't know	None
2015																								
Pulse Asia	Sep 8–15, 2015	2,400	±2%	24	23	9	–	13	–	–	–	–	4	5		–	3	–	5	4	9.1% B. Aquino III (LP): 6% Pangilinan (LP): 2% Henares (Ind): 0.1% Others: 1%	3		
SWS	Sep 2–5, 2015	1,200	±3%	27	20	5	9	7	24	–	–	2	7	3	5	–	3	–	4	4	3.9% Atienza (Buhay): 0.9% Others/Refused/Don't know/None: 3%			
Pulse Asia	Aug 27–Sep 3, 2015	1,200	±3%	26	25	7	–	7	–	–	–	–	–	–	–	–	2	–	–	–	–			
RMN	Aug 11–18, 2015	4,718	±2.5%	36.01	21.36	–	–	11.82	–	–	–	–	–	–		–	–	–	–	–	–			
SWS	Jun 5–8, 2015	1,200	±3%	21	7	2	3	1	7	2	–	–	3	3	1.4	0.7	–	12	1	1.1	1.2% Moreno (PMP): 0.7% Pacquiao (UNA): 0.5%	22		8
Pulse Asia	May 30–Jun 5, 2015	1,200	±3%	41	15	12	9	9	–	–	–	–	–	6	–	–	1	–	–	5	1	1	0.2	3
IBON	May 13–23, 2015	1,496	±3%	15.9	2.5	–	–	–	6.8	1.9	–	–	–	–	–	–	–	5.1	–	–	7.8	13		60
Laylo	May 8–18, 2015	1,500	±2.6%	23	16	11	11	5	–	–	–	–	7	7	–	–	–		5	6	–			
SWS	Mar 20–23, 2015	1,200	±3%	26	6	3	4	3	7	5	–	0.6	3	1.6	1.7	–	–	12	0.6	3	5	–	–	7
Pulse Asia	Mar 1–7, 2015	1,200	±3%	29	16	13	11	11	–	–	3	4	–	–	–	2	0.4	–	–	6	1	0.2	1	2
2014																								
Pulse Asia	Nov 14–20, 2014	1,200	±3%	33	20	13	–	8	–	–	6	5	–	–	–	3	1	–	–	8	1.3% Gatchalian (NPC): 0.3% Others: 1%	–	1	2
Pulse Asia	Sep 8–15, 2014	1,200	±3%	31	19	9	–	6	–	–	5	5	–	–	–	3	3	–	6	7	–			
Pulse Asia	Jun 24–Jul 6, 2014	1,200	±3%	26	22	14	–	8	–	–	5	5	–	–	–	4	1	–	4	6	Others: 1%	1	1	1
Pulse Asia	Mar 19–26, 2014	1,200	±3%	24	20	6	–	5	–	–	–	4	–	5	–	3	1	8	5	7	10.3% K. Aquino (Ind): 5% Bam Aquino (LP): 3% JV Ejercito (UNA): 2% Others: 0.3%	0.2	0.3	–
