= PiliPinas Debates 2016 =

Series of presidential debates in the Philippines

- Title card used during the first and last leg of the debates
- Created by: COMELEC; KBP
- Developed by: Various
- Presented by: Varies per leg
- Opening theme: Pili Pinas by Gravity
- Ending theme: Pili Pinas by Gravity
- Country of origin: Philippines
- No. of episodes: 4 (list of episodes)

Production
- Producer: Various
- Production location: 4 locations
- Running time: 124 minutes

Original release
- Network: GMA Network (Mindanao leg); TV5 (Visayas leg); ABS-CBN (Luzon leg); CNN Philippines (Vice President leg)
- Release: February 21 – April 24, 2016

Related
- PiliPinas Debates 2022

PiliPinas Debates 2016 is a debate series administered by the Commission on Elections (COMELEC) with the assistance of the Kapisanan ng mga Brodkaster ng Pilipinas in preparation for the May 9, 2016, general election. In January 2016, the Commission on Elections confirmed that they would hold three presidential debates and one vice presidential debate. This will be the first time that the COMELEC will host debates since the 1992 elections, with ABC-5 as the host network fresh from the launch of the recently restored broadcast network on February 21 of the same year, after a 20-year rest due to Martial Law. The debates were branded as PiliPinas Debates 2016. The first word is a portmanteau of Pili, Filipino for "choose" and Pinas, shortcut for the Philippines in Filipino.

== Broadcast and coverage ==
The first leg of the debate was conducted on Mindanao and was held on February 21 at the Mini-Theater Building of the Capitol University in Cagayan de Oro. It aired on GMA Network and was simulcast on Super Radyo DZBB, RGMA stations and KBP-affiliated member radio stations nationwide (GMA was a KBP member from April 1973 until the said network withdrew from its membership in September 2003) and its livestream channels. The Mindanao leg was moderated by Mike Enriquez and Jessica Soho of GMA Network and John Nery of Philippine Daily Inquirer.

The second leg was conducted in Visayas and was held at the Performing Arts Hall of the University of the Philippines Cebu on March 20, 2016. It was aired simultaneously over TV5, AksyonTV, Bloomberg TV Philippines, Radyo5 92.3 News FM and KBP-affiliated member radio stations nationwide with live streaming broadcast also made available via news5.com.ph, bilangpilipino.com and YouTube. It was moderated by News5 chief Luchi Cruz-Valdez.

CNN Philippines hosted the Vice Presidential Debate on April 10, 2016. It was moderated by Pia Hontiveros and Pinky Webb. The debate was held at the Quadricentennial Pavilion of the University of Santo Tomas.

The third and last leg of debates was held on April 24 at the Student Plaza, University of Pangasinan in Dagupan. It aired simultaneously in SD and HD over ABS-CBN, ABS-CBN News Channel and SD over ABS-CBN Sports and Action, DZMM Radyo Patrol 630/TeleRadyo, ABS-CBN Regional stations, The Filipino Channel (for international viewers) and KBP-affiliated member radio stations nationwide. Live streaming was also made available via news.abs-cbn.com, tfc.tv (for international viewers), mb.com.ph, iWant TV, Sky On Demand (for SkyCable and Destiny Cable postpaid subscribers) and ABS-CBN News official YouTube channel. The Luzon leg was moderated by veteran anchors, Karen Davila and Tony Velasquez.

Host cities of the debates

Office	Date	Media partners		Location		
Office	Date	TV Network	Newspaper	Leg	Host city	University
President	February 21, 2016	GMA Network	Philippine Daily Inquirer	Mindanao (details)	Cagayan de Oro	Capitol University
President	March 20, 2016	TV5	Philippine Star; BusinessWorld	Visayas (details)	Cebu City	University of the Philippines Cebu
President	April 24, 2016	ABS-CBN	Manila Bulletin	Luzon (details)	Dagupan	University of Pangasinan
Vice President	April 10, 2016	CNN Philippines	Business Mirror	Metro Manila (details)	Manila	University of Santo Tomas

=== Ratings ===
The table below shows the recorded ratings of the debates according to market research firms, Kantar Media and AGB Nielsen for Nationwide and Mega Manila TV ratings consecutively.

Date	Leg	TV network	Moderator/(s)	Nationwide	Mega Manila
February 21, 2016	Mindanao	GMA Network	Mike Enriquez, Jessica Soho, and John Nery	23.8%	25.3%
March 20, 2016	Visayas	TV5	Luchi Cruz-Valdez	8.5%	11.2%
April 24, 2016	Luzon	ABS-CBN	Karen Davila and Tony Velasquez	40.6%	27.9%

== Summary ==
Legend
P Participated A Absent

Presidential debates
Location		Jejomar Binay	Miriam Defensor Santiago	Rodrigo Duterte	Grace Poe	Mar Roxas
Leg	Host city					
Mindanao (details)	Cagayan de Oro	P	P	P	P	P
Visayas (details)	Cebu City	P	A (Note: Santiago was absent in the second debate due to cancer treatment.)	P	P	P
Luzon (details)	Dagupan	P	P	P	P	P

Vice Presidential debate
Location		Alan Cayetano	Chiz Escudero	Gregorio Honasan	Bongbong Marcos	Leni Robredo	Antonio Trillanes
Leg	Host city						
Metro Manila (details)	Manila	P	P	P	P	P	P

== Criticisms ==
=== Debate proper ===
The conduct of the debate was subjected to several criticisms. In the first leg of the debates, GMA Network was criticized for the number of commercials played with reports showing that 35.6% (48 out of 135 minutes) were dedicated to commercials. Meanwhile, the second leg of the debate was criticized for the lack of professionalism with candidates resorting to bickering and petty fights instead of analyzing relevant issues in the country. Finally, the third leg, hosted by ABS-CBN was criticized for the amount of political ads played during this leg.

=== Availability on online media platforms ===
On February 19, 2016, Rappler sued COMELEC chairman Andres Bautista for “granting exclusive broadcasting and livestreaming rights to handpicked media partners" before the Supreme Court, not allowing online media to live stream the events. Rappler asked the high court to intervene to allow the debates to be streamed by more than one outlet.

The social service claimed that the memorandum of understanding excluded online media from covering and streaming the debate; Bautista countered, stating that Rappler was being unprofessional and that they should have read the contract they signed. Rappler countered by saying it had raised the issues with Bautista and signed the agreement, believing in good faith that COMELEC would resolve the issues. Rappler's lawyer, JJ Disini, said the process for selecting media outlets could have been more transparent; he also expressed concern that the state-owned People's Television Network was excluded from the agreement.

== See also ==
- Harapan ng Bise: The ABS-CBN Vice Presidential Debate
