= Nicole Curato =

Filipina sociologist

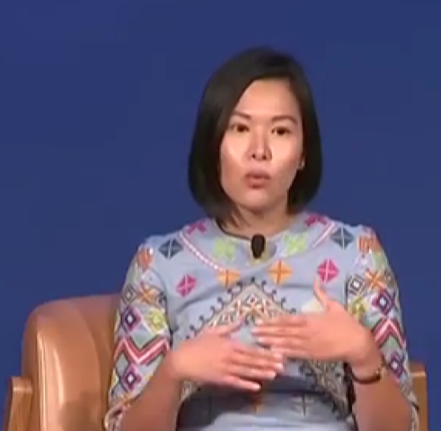
- Born: Nicola Paula Cayco Curato
- Occupations: Sociologist, educator, journalist

Academic background
- Education: University of the Philippines Diliman; University of Manchester; University of Birmingham

Nicola Paula Cayco Curato, also known as "Nicole Curato", is a Filipina sociologist best known for her academic work on deliberative democracy, and her media work providing academic commentary on politics in the Philippines.

== Early life and education ==
She took her bachelor's degree of Sociology at University of the Philippines Diliman, her Master's Degree in Sociology at the University of Manchester, and her Doctoral degree at the University of Birmingham, both in the United Kingdom.

== Academic work ==
Curato is the recipient of Discovery Early Career Research Award Fellowship at the Centre for Deliberative Democracy and Global Governance at the University of Canberra. The award is funded by the Australian Research Council (ARC).

She joined the Centre as a post-doctoral research fellow at the Australian National University in 2011 where she worked on an ARC linkage project on the Australian Citizens' Parliament with John Dryzek and Simon Niemeyer. Before moving to Australia, she was an Assistant Professor of Sociology at the University of the Philippines-Diliman.

Her work has been published in academic journals including Qualitative Inquiry, Policy Sciences, Current Sociology, European Political Science Review and Acta Politica, among others. Her recent work has examined the character of Rodrigo Duterte's populism.

She also served as editor for several Special Issues of the Philippine Sociological Review.

== Political commentary ==
In the Philippines, Curato is best known as a go-to analyst for television and web coverage of political affairs in the Philippines. Among her more prominent appearances include her stint as post-debate panellist at the Manila/Vice-Presidential leg of the COMELEC-led PiliPinas Debates 2016, and her regular commentary for Rappler, CNN Philippines and Filipino Freethinkers.

In 2013, she was awarded as one of the Philippines' Ten Outstanding Young Men/People for the field of sociology.

== See also ==
- Patricia Evangelista
