= PiliPinas Debate 2016 – Luzon leg =

PiliPinas Debates 2016 (Luzon leg)
- Date: April 24, 2016
- Time: 5:45pm-9:52pm (UTC+8) (Note: The debate proper started at 6:00 p.m. and ended at 9:28 p.m.)
- Duration: 161 minutes
- Venue: Student Plaza, PhinMA University of Pangasinan
- Location: Dagupan, Pangasinan, Philippines; 16°3′48″N 120°20′29″E
- Type: Televised debate
- Organized by: COMELEC; KBP; ABS-CBN; Manila Bulletin
- Participants: Jejomar Binay; Miriam Defensor Santiago; Rodrigo Duterte; Grace Poe; Mar Roxas
- Presenters: Karen Davila and Tony Velasquez (ABS-CBN)
- Preceded by: Visayas leg
- Succeeded by: None (Final)

The Luzon leg of the PiliPinas Debates 2016 is the third and final presidential debate of the 2016 Philippine elections, was held at the University of Pangasinan in Dagupan on April 24, 2016. It was organized by COMELEC and KBP with ABS-CBN, and Manila Bulletin as media partners.

The debate was moderated by ABS-CBN News and Current Affairs anchors Karen Davila and Tony Velasquez. The debate will also have a pre-debate and post-debate analysis anchored by Lynda Jumilla, Prof. Popoy de Vera and Alvin Elchico on ABS-CBN and ANC and Julius Babao and Jing Castañeda on DZMM, while TJ Manotoc and Gretchen Ho hosted an online show that will aired during the commercial breaks of the debate proper.

ABS-CBN, Manila Bulletin, KBP, Comelec and the representatives of the presidential candidates signed the memorandum of agreement on April 14, days before the staging of the debate.

All five presidential candidates attended the final presidential debate.

== Broadcast and coverage ==
The debate aired live on ABS-CBN (Channel 2 and HD), ABS-CBN News Channel (SD and HD), DZMM Radyo Patrol 630/TeleRadyo, KBP-affiliated radio stations nationwide, news.abs-cbn.com, mb.com.ph, IWant TV, The Filipino Channel, and TFC.tv, with replays from April 24–26 on ABS-CBN Sports and Action, GMA News TV, TV5, CNN Philippines, and PTV-4.

Out of the 208 minute of broadcast, 47 minutes were allotted for commercials, with 12 minutes of these were political advertisements. The final leg of the debate recorded a 40.6% nationwide rating, the highest rating among the four PiliPinas debates legs, according to Kantar Media Philippines, also the official hashtag #PiliPinasDebates2016 become one of the trending topics in Twitter (Philippines and Worldwide) during the debate proper.

== Format ==
Unlike, the first two legs held in the Mindanao and Visayas regions, the format of the final presidential debate will be in a town hall format. Candidates will have 2 minutes for the opening statements and 5 minutes for the closing remarks. The topic of the opening statement is the vision of the candidates for the country by the end of their term in 2022, while in the closing remarks is what they can do to make a child named Jhessa Balbastro from Bohol (who wishes to be a teacher) and other children to make come true and pursue their dreams.

The townhall allows the public to ask questions to candidates. The representatives from the involved sectors were selected based on the queries and suggestions that public made for the candidates through the "Halalan Hugot" campaign. The topics in the first part of the debate are the dispute in the South China Sea, public transport and the traffic in Metro Manila, job security, concerns of Overseas Filipino Workers, basic public health, and the road to peace in conflict areas in Mindanao. Like the Visayas leg, candidates will pose questions and facing-off to a fellow candidate.

On the third part of segment called "Fast Talk", candidates will only say yes or no and their quick reply on the certain national issues.

== See also ==
- Harapan ng Bise
- List of programs broadcast by ABS-CBN
