= Capitol University Medical Center =

Private hospital in Cagayan de Oro, Philippines

Capitol University Medical Center Foundation of Cagayan Incorporated
- Capitol Conglomerate

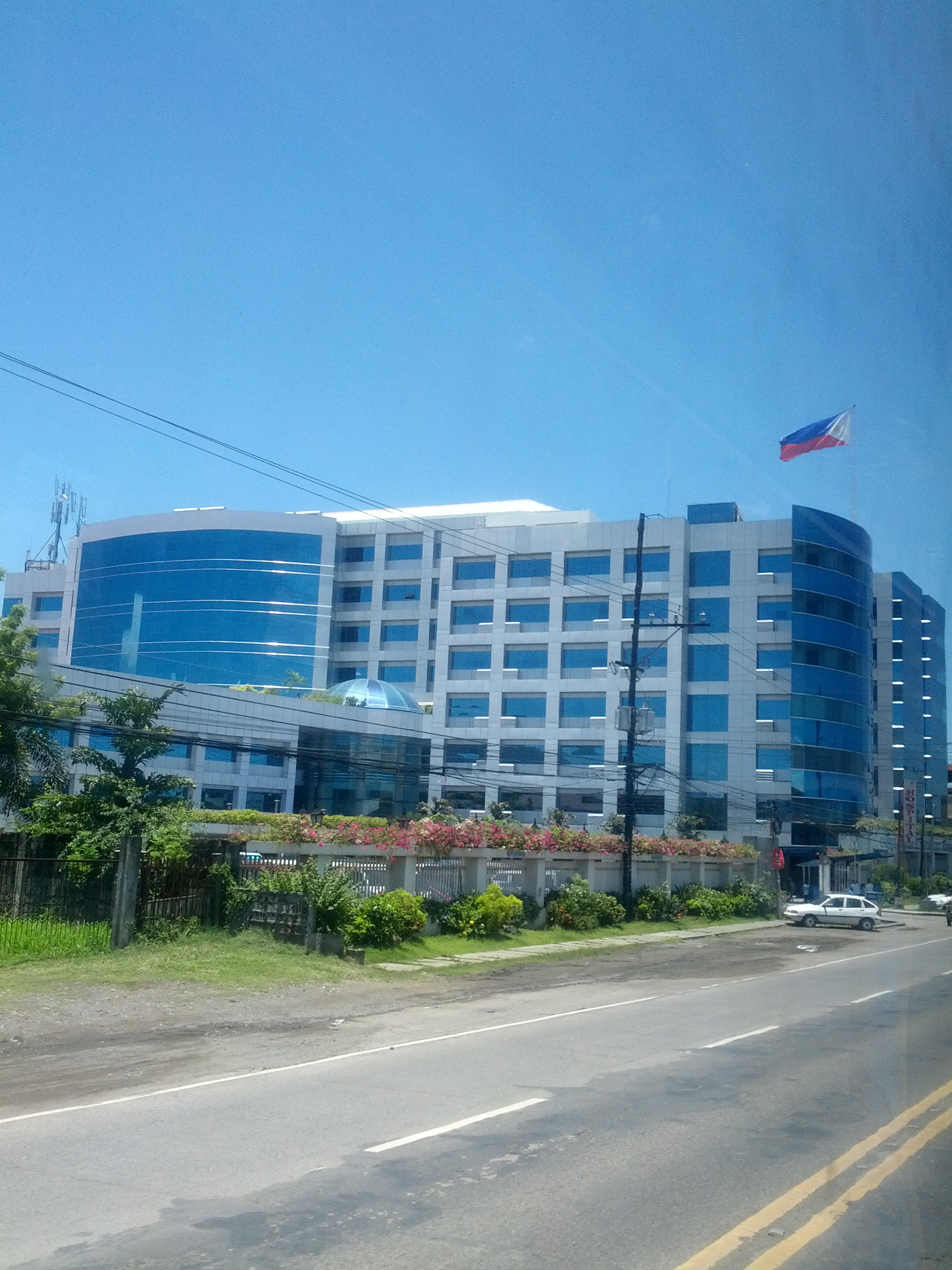
- CUMC in daytime

Geography
- Location: Claro M. Recto Highway, Gusa, Cagayan de Oro, Misamis Oriental, Philippines
- Coordinates: 8°28′44″N 124°40′22″E

Organization
- Care system: Private
- Funding: Foundation, non-stock, non-profit
- Type: Training, research, testing
- Affiliated university: Capitol University, Iligan Capitol College, Lyceum of Iligan Foundation, Gingoog City Colleges, Bataan Heroes Memorial College, Capitol University Basic Education Department

Services
- Standards: Level 2 Hospital
- Beds: 181 present capacity / 250 future capacity

History
- Former name: Cagayan Capitol General Hospital Foundation Incorporated
- Opened: 1973

Links
- Website: www.cumc.com.ph

Capitol University Medical Center (formerly Cagayan Capitol General Hospital Foundation Incorporated) in Cagayan de Oro, Philippines, is the Base Hospital for the Capitol University. This private hospital is one of the largest and leading private medical facilities in Mindanao. In 2009, the new and expanded CUMC opened its doors to hundreds offering sects to affiliate in this bustling hospital. Capitol University Medical Center stands as the base training of Capitol University's College of Health Sciences' Nursing and Medical Laboratory Scientist students in this medical center.
