= Quadricentennial Pavilion =

University gymnasium in Manila, Philippines

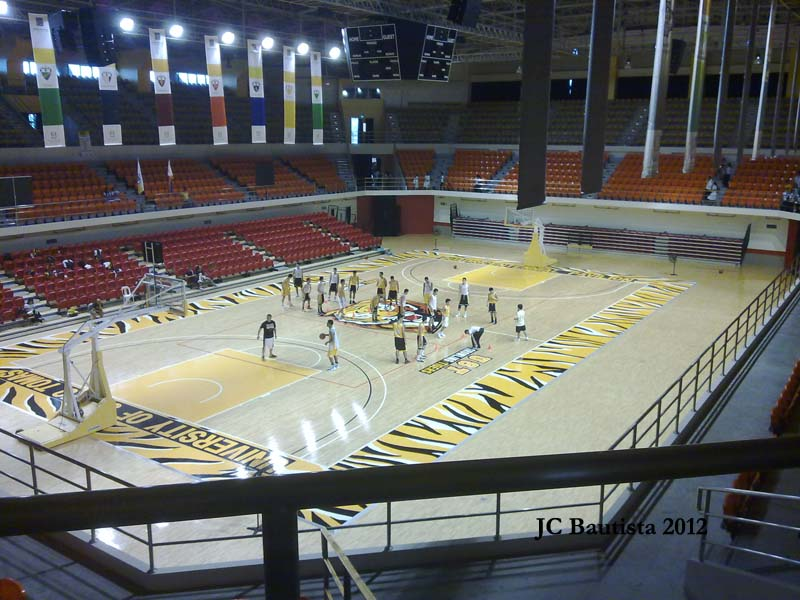
- Quadricentennial Pavilion basketball court in 2012
- Interactive map of Quadricentennial Pavilion
- Former names: UST Sports Complex
- Location: University of Santo Tomas, Sampaloc, Manila, Philippines
- Coordinates: 14°36′33.80″N 120°59′28.50″E
- Owner: University of Santo Tomas
- Capacity: 5,792
- Surface: Maple wood (basketball court)
- Scoreboard: S'portable Scoreboards
- Field size: 65.98 m^{2} × 76 m^{2} (710.2 sq ft × 818.1 sq ft)

Construction
- Groundbreaking: July 29, 2008
- Built: 2011
- Cost: ₱788,676,000
- Architect: Recio + Casas Architects
- Project managers: Asian Technicon Managers and Consultants, Inc.
- Structural engineers: Aromin & Sy + Associates
- Services engineers: R. A. Mojica and Partners; L. R. Punsalan and Associates; NBF Consulting Inc
- General contractor: Hilmarc's Construction Corporation

Tenants
- UST Growling Tigers (2012–present); Philippine Basketball Association

The Quadricentennial Pavilion (colloquially known as QPav and originally known as UST Sports Complex) is a 5,792-seat multi-purpose gymnasium of the University of Santo Tomas (UST) located at the site of the former old Engineering Complex and adjacent football field in front of the Roque Ruaño Building.

The Quadricentennial Pavilion is one of the building construction projects of the university for its celebration of 400th year of foundation in 2011. The new sports complex replaced the old UST Gymnasium which was built in 1933 and demolished in 2011.

== History ==
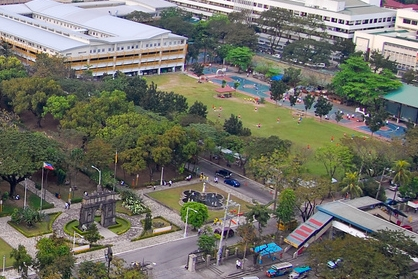
The UST Engineering Complex in 2008, which would be later the site of the Quadricentennial Pavilion.

Since 1933, the university only had the old UST Gymnasium, which was considered then as the biggest gymnasium during its time, as venue to hold practices for its athletes, as well as to hold non-sporting events.

In recent years, the student population increased to 40,000, prompting university officials to recognize the need for a new sporting facility within the campus.

A groundbreaking ceremony was held on July 29, 2008, after the Vatican gave its "blessing" to the project as UST is a pontifical university, directly under the supervision of the Holy See.

The location of the sports complex lies on the former site of the Engineering Sports Complex that has an open field for softball and football, outdoor basketball courts, a tennis court, a covered basketball court with bleachers, and a canteen.

It was originally named as the UST Sports Complex, but the Council of Regents announced on October 18, 2011, that the new building will be called the Quadricentennial Pavilion.

Rev. Fr. Rolando V. de la Rosa, the former Rector of the university, described the then yet to be built facility as more than just a place for events and ceremonies as it will serve as a monument to "the unique and unparalleled holistic" sports development program of the university. The facility was planned to be the home of the UST varsity players and the Growling Tigers starting academic year of 2012.

The Quadricentennial Pavilion has been the venue for the Solemn Investiture (Faculties and Colleges offering graduate and undergraduate programs), Graduation (Senior High School), and Moving Up Ceremonies (Junior High School) of its faculties and colleges since 2012, with some colleges with smaller number of graduates using other university facilities such as the Santisimo Rosario Parish (for graduates of the Ecclesiastical Faculties), Albertus Magnus Auditorium (for Education High School and the Conservatory of Music), or the San Martin de Porres Building's "Medicine" Auditorium.

The Quadricentennial Pavilion has also served as the main venue of the annual Philippine Conference on New Evangelization (PCNE), hosted by the Archdiocese of Manila, since 2013, except on 2020, when it was held at Araneta Coliseum, and from 2021-2023 due to the COVID-19 pandemic. The PCNE returned to UST in 2024.

From at least UAAP Season 85 to UAAP Season 86, the arena has been mostly used by the Lady Tigresses and occasionally by the Growling Tigers men's basketball team.

On November 16, 2025, the Pavilion hosted two Philippine Basketball Association games, with the NLEX Road Warriors and the Titan Ultra Giant Risers in the first game, while the second game featured the Phoenix Fuel Masters and Barangay Ginebra San Miguel.

== Architecture and design ==
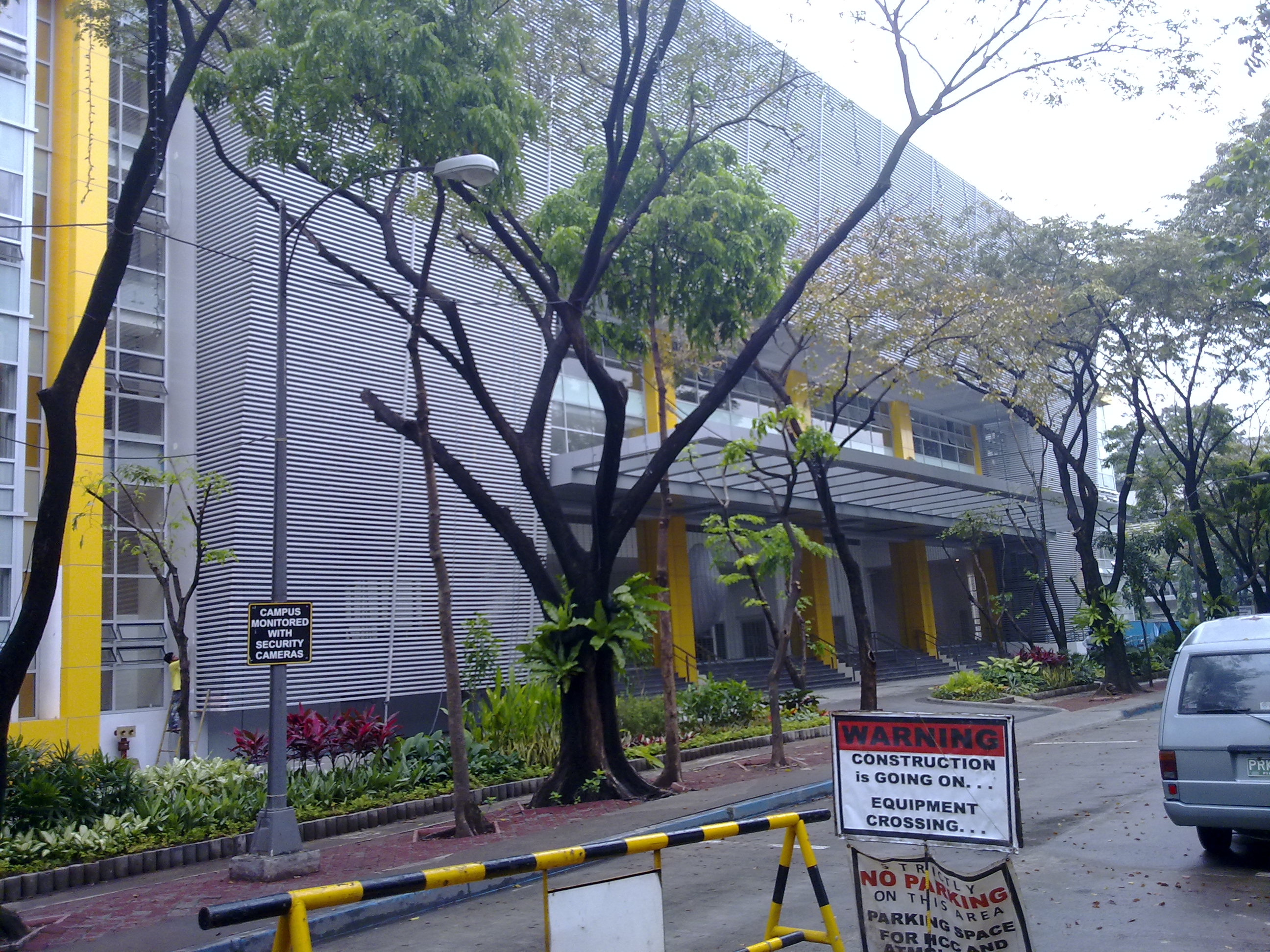
Facade of the building.

The Quadricentennial Pavilion was designed by chief architect Carmelo Casas, who also designed the UST Carpark Building. The first architectural plan for the facility was made in 2007. For three years before the groundbreaking of the facility in July 2008, Millenium Sports Universal Co. coordinated with Casas in the planning and design stage where they were tasked to create a sporting facility of at least 5,000 seating capacity.

The structure has four storeys with its first floor being elevated to address potential flooding. The dimensions of the sports facility is 65.98 by 76 square meters (710.2 sq ft × 818.1 sq ft) and stands on a 11,784.33-square-meter (126,845.5 sq ft) lot. A double wall design, by devising two walls separated by a space, was employed for the interior walls of the structure for noise insulation. To minimize solar exposure to the sports venue's interior, louvers were utilized as part of the building's façade. This feature was also used to highlight to emphasize the building's exterior.

The project manager the facility was Asian Technicon Managers & Consultants, Inc.

== Features ==
=== Sports ===
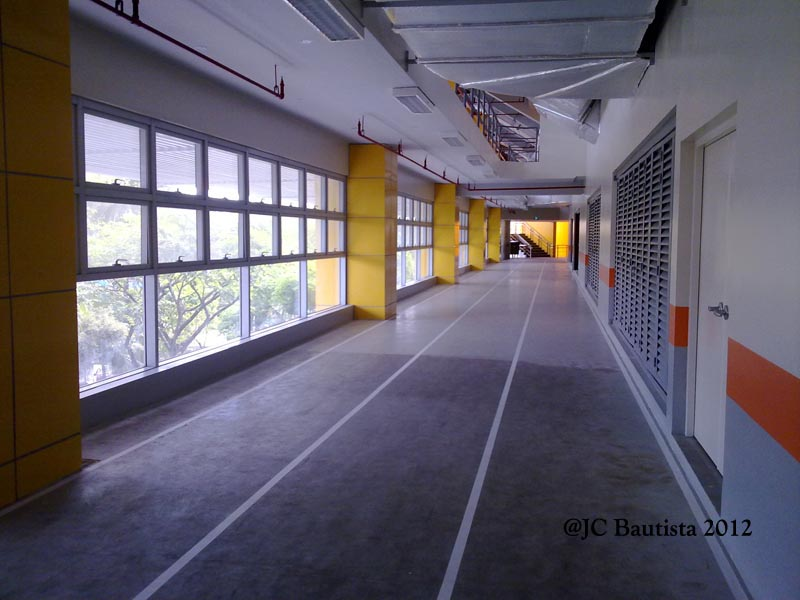
The indoor track, viewed from the 3rd floor hallway.

The dance hall for the Salinggawi Dance Troupe as well as training halls for badminton, fencing, judo, table tennis, and taekwondo are located in the ground floor of the Quadricentennial Pavilion. There is also a two-level fitness center on this floor and a gymnastics room. Five lecture rooms for IPEA (Institute of Physical Education and Athletics) is also located on this floor. On the third level, the facility features a two-lane overall track encircling the building. The first floor training facilities and dance hall has a 2,985 square meters (32,130 sq ft) of rubberized flooring.

Four-storey sports complex mainly features a maplewood hardcourt basketball court on the second floor with rows of seats rising up to the fourth level of the building. The topmost section are accessible from the fourth level while the middle section is accessible from the third level. The court is surrounded by a tiger-stripe border with a tiger's head as another design element. The basketball venue is surrounded by orange, red and yellow seats.

In total the Quadricentennial Pavilion has a seating capacity of at least 5,792 people. local-distributor Millenium Sports Universal Co., provided retractable rows of 1,562 polyprothylene chairs. Outside the playing court, the flooring is made up of engineered wood by Robbins which was also responsible for the wooden court. Maine-base Hussey supplied the retractable rows and chairs up to the fourth level. S'portable Scoreboards supplied the 4-sided scoreboard of the facility.

=== Others ===
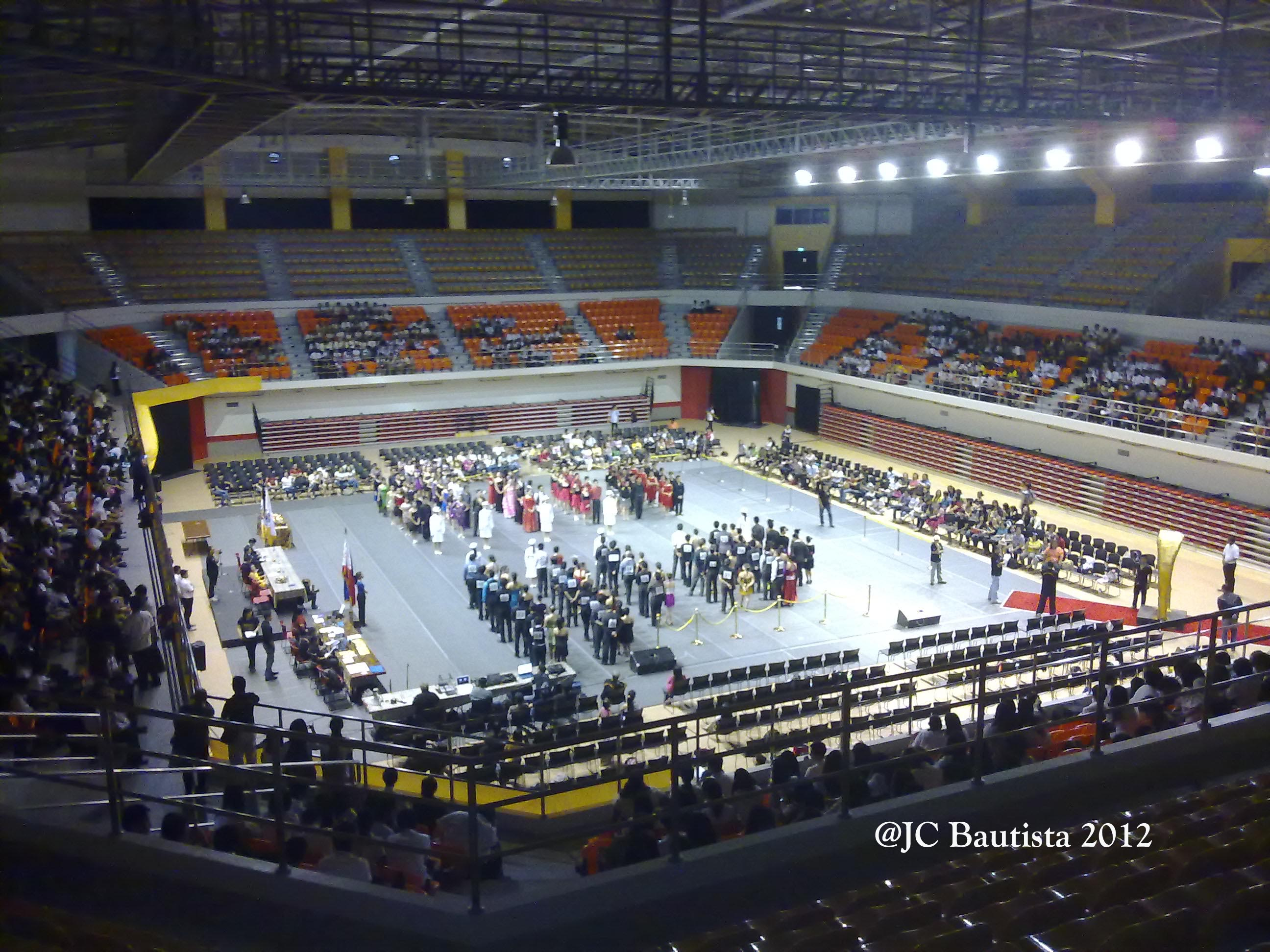
The basketball court of the Quadricentennial Pavilion hosting an event during the 2012 IPEA week.

The second floor holds the offices for IPEA, guidance counselors, and sports science. The institute have a faculty room and other multimedia rooms for students. This floor also hosts two dug-outs and two lounges for coaches.

The new gym also serves as a museum that enshrines all the trophies, medals and other memorabilia of various UAAP championships the university has won. Championship banners will also hang from the rafters of the gymnasium. On the third level, the facility's windows holds posters and memorabilia displaying sporting events and selected Thomasian athletes.

On one side facing the Roque Ruano Building are retail spaces for banks and restaurants. The facility is also capable of hosting non-athletic events such as concerts, graduation ceremonies, conferences, and the university mass.

=== Utilities ===
Its toilets and faucets inside the lavatories and restrooms are automated and the entire vicinity is controlled by a centralized air-conditioning system. A closed circuit television (CCTV) system is also installed in selected areas within the sports venue for security. The CCTV network is controlled from the Information Technology Data room which is located in the second floor of the facility.

=== Campione steel sculpture ===
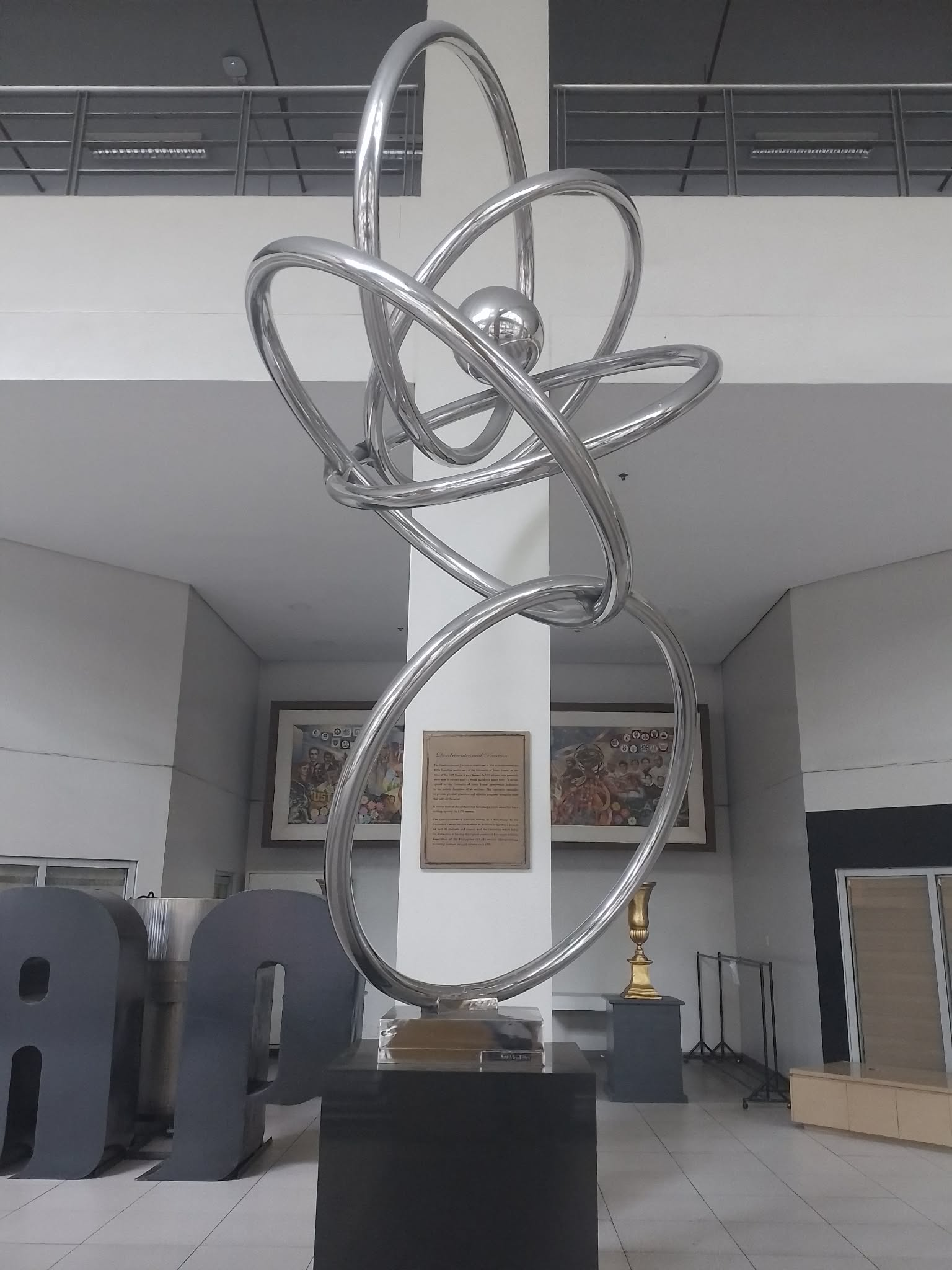
Campione in 2026

The main lobby of the facility features a steel sculpture named Campione (Spanish: champion), designed by Thomasian artist Joe Datuin. The sculptor won in the 2008 Olympic Committee Sports and Arts contest.

== Events ==
Date	Event	Ref.
October 1, 2011	Gawad Kalinga 8th Anniversary	
November 16–18, 2011	7th Quacquarelli Symonds—Asia Pacific Professional Leaders in Education (QS-Apple) Conference and Exhibition	
November 29, 2011	10th International Congress International Society of Dacryology and Dry Eye (ISD & DE)	
February 28–29, 2012	4th National COCOPEA Congress	
October 16-18, 2013	1st Philippine Conference on New Evangelization	
January 15-17, 2015	2nd Philippine Conference on New Evangelization	
April 10, 2016	PiliPinas Debates 2016 – Metro Manila leg	
July 15-17, 2016	3rd Philippine Conference on New Evangelization	
September 3, 2016	UAAP Season 79 Ballroom Formation Dance Competition	
July 28-30, 2017	4th Philippine Conference on New Evangelization	
July 18-22, 2018	5th Philippine Conference on New Evangelization	
April 28, 2019	CNN Philippines debate for the 2019 Senate election	
July 18-21, 2019	6th Philippine Conference on New Evangelization	
February 26, 2022	CNN Philippines Vice Presidential Debates	
February 27, 2022	CNN Philippines Presidential Debates	
May 2022	Parish Pastoral Council for Responsible Voting command center for the 2022 general election	
January 19-21, 2024	10th Philippine Conference on New Evangelization	
July 18-20, 2025	11th Philippine Conference on New Evangelization	
November 16, 2025	2025–26 PBA Philippine Cup elimination round	
