= PiliPinas Debates 2016 – Mindanao leg =

Philippine presidential debate

PiliPinas Debates 2016 (Mindanao leg)
- Date: February 21, 2016
- Time: 5:00 p.m. – 7:15 p.m. (UTC+8)
- Duration: 87 minutes
- Venue: Mini-Theater Building, Capitol University
- Location: Cagayan de Oro, Philippines; 08°29′17.9″N 124°39′08.2″E
- Type: Televised debate
- Organized by: COMELEC; KBP; GMA Network; Philippine Daily Inquirer (PDI)
- Participants: Jejomar Binay; Miriam Defensor Santiago; Rodrigo Duterte; Grace Poe; Mar Roxas
- Presenters: Jessica Soho and Mike Enriquez (GMA); John Nery (PDI)
- Succeeded by: Visayas leg

The Mindanao leg of PiliPinas Debates 2016 was held on February 21, 2016, and hosted at the Mini-Theater Building of the Capitol University in Cagayan de Oro, Philippines. It was hosted by the Commission on Elections (COMELEC) with the assistance of KBP (the Filipino broadcasters' association), GMA Network and the Philippine Daily Inquirer (GMA had been a KBP member from 1970s/80s until the network withdrew from its membership in 2003, but it can be come back once the KBP-equivalents will be established elsewhere in Asia).

By late January 2016, all presidential candidates had confirmed their attendance to the Mindanao events. This included Roy Señeres, who was still vying for the presidency at the time before withdrawing his candidacy in early February.

The debate was attended by all five presidential candidates. In a separate venue, 1,500 people, or 300 supporters for each candidate, were allowed to watch the debate at the university's gymnasium.

The coverage of the debates took 135 minutes from 5:00 p.m. – 7:15 p.m. (UTC+8). 48 minutes of time was devoted to advertisements.

== Broadcast and coverage ==
GMA-7 provided nationwide coverage of the Mindanao leg. GMA Pinoy TV broadcast the debates in Middle East, North Africa, Europe, United States and Canada live and in the Asia Pacific region with a slight delay. Super Radyo dzBB provided radio coverage of the event, along with all KBP-affiliated radio stations nationwide, which were asked to broadcast the debate.

GMA made a 360-degree livestream available for the event using a proprietary technology developed by GMA New Media Inc. This was the first event in the Philippines to be made available via 360-degree live video streaming.

The debate was presented by anchors Jessica Soho and Mike Enriquez of GMA News and John Nery, editor-in-chief of Inquirer.net. GMA News also hosted discussions over its social media accounts on Facebook and Twitter, where users could follow and talk about the debate. The Emoji Meter system was made available for viewers to react to the candidates during the debate.

GMA's accounts on Facebook, Twitter, Instagram, and Viber provided exclusive content related to the event which was not part of the broadcast, such as backstage video and live audience interviews during breaks.

=== Provincial media concerns ===
Provincial media expressed concerns over what they saw as an "exclusivity clause" imposed by the Manila media to squeeze out the local press; only five slots were allocated for local editors and publishers in the debate hall itself, with another five slots for newspaper reporters to sit in the debate's media center. This prompted the Cagayan de Oro Press Club to issue a "Statement of Indignation" and point to prior suggestions for a boycott of the debate by regional media, which it ruled out. Rodrigo Duterte, one of the presidential candidates, threatened to boycott the debates if the issue was not resolved, though he ultimately participated.

== Format ==
The main issues tackled were agriculture development, poverty reduction, charter change and peace and order. The debate followed a modified two-moderator format, modeled after the Republican Party's presidential debates of the United States 2016 elections.

There were three rounds of questions, and candidates were paired in each round. For each pair, the first candidate was given 90 seconds to answer the question asked, then the paired candidate had 60 seconds to express his or her rebuttal and the first candidate then had 30 seconds to reply to the rebuttal.

== Debate ==
=== Opening statements ===
Each candidate was given 60 seconds to deliver their opening remarks. Jejomar Binay highlighted poverty issues and his record as mayor of Makati. Santiago noted that, while the country is rich in natural and human resources, it is one of the poorest in Asia. Duterte promised to eradicate corruption, drugs and crime in six months. Poe promised to allocate 30 percent of the national budget to Mindanao if she were elected, while Roxas compared selecting a president to choosing a bus driver.

=== First round: Track Record ===
The pairing was determined alphabetically by the participants' surname. Santiago was sorted according to her double surname (Defensor Santiago), and Roxas, the last candidate, is paired with Binay, the first.

Binay noted that he has no ill-gotten wealth, having inherited his land assets from his parents. Defensor Santiago rebutted, asking Binay when he got the properties during his term as mayor of Makati. Binay stated that he got these properties during his stint as a legal counsel and through the help of his wife, Elenita Binay, who also served one term as mayor of Makati.

Senator Santiago answered that she is still qualified to run for president despite her battle with stage 4 lung cancer, noting that there is no provision in the 1987 Philippine constitution that prohibits a public official from running for health reasons. Duterte did not debate with her during the rebuttal, saying "I don't see Sen. Santiago passing away within the next 20 years”. Santiago, later commented that no politician except for Duterte had a record in resolving graft and corruption cases.

On his planned "bloody" presidency, Duterte vowed to continue killing the criminals and drug lords in accordance with the law with the help of police and the military. Despite having several partners, the mayor denied any accusations of lasciviousness. In response, Poe said that Duterte, who admitted he was a womanizer, needed to respect women. She vowed that her so-called "Gobyernong May Puso" (Government with a Heart) would respect and fight for the rights of men, women and the LGBT community.

Poe quoted a line from a song from Gloc-9, "Upuan", in her address. She also stated that she worked together with Defensor Santiago in pushing and creating senate bills on budgets for food for children and farmers, as well as the Freedom of Information Bill. Roxas replied that the presidency is not on-the-job-training. Poe countered, saying that Roxas, despite working for three administrations as a secretary of DTI, DOTC and DILG, did not need more experience to catch up on the lack of developments in the transportation sector by the government.

Roxas was questioned about his incompetence in handling the issues of MRT and Haiyan (Yolanda). Roxas stated that during his term as the DOTC secretary, more than 100 contracts on infrastructure projects worth 100 billion were put out for bid without any anomalies. On the MRT, Roxas said that he stopped the supposed maintenance contract with a private firm due to an anomaly. Roxas claimed that the MRT's newly commissioned trains would be in service by March. Roxas defended his record on the rehabilitation of areas affected by Typhoon Haiyan, noting that he was there, before, during and after the typhoon, unlike other politicians who arrived via helicopter but later departed like a tourist. Binay then responded in a comment that he is a "decisive and effective leader" and remarked that he saw a lot from his helicopter regarding the effects of the typhoon.

=== Second round: Poverty & Development ===
The order of candidates was determined by a draw.

If elected, Binay said that he would implement an agricultural modernization plan with the help of the private sector, noting the industry's small contribution to the gross domestic product. He wants to continue the Comprehensive Agrarian Reform Program (government subsidies) for the benefit of farmers, shipping high-yielding crops and the removal of irrigation fees; he also seeks to solve post-harvest problems through programs that he implemented while mayor of Makati. Poe, on her rebuttal said that there should be "agro-industrial zones" established by the DTI and DA, to assist in marketing basic commodities, soil testing and replanting coconut plants using the coco-levy funds.

On the matter of food for the poor, Poe declared that she wants to provide free lunch in public schools, subsidies for rice farmers on irrigation and others. Poe pointed out that as the fifth largest coconut producer in the world, her government will be focused on the replanting of coconut plants using the coco-levy funds that will also be used in scholarship programs for the children of coco farmers. She also said that agro-industrial zones where farmers can sell their products should be established by the Department of Trade and Industry and the Department of Agriculture. Santiago replied that there is no president or even a candidate that has an extensive antipoverty campaign.

Santiago suggested to expand the national budget in key areas, including health, education, rural infrastructure and improvements to social welfare; she also wanted to have constantly lower income taxes and abolish real estate taxes. Roxas replied that the government under the Aquino administration had continuous comfort and success in the fast-growing economic growth of the country and he wanted to continue the safety net programs, particularly for PhilHealth beneficiaries. Santiago replied that the other candidates' plans are all "promises way up in the sky".

Roxas cited high-interest loans as one of the reasons why Filipino fishermen are part of the "poorest of the poor" people in the country. Roxas mulled low-interest loans and investments in new technology including fish finders (radars), post-catch facilities (chillers and packaging), and infrastructure for fishermen. Duterte, in his rebuttal, agreed and noted he wanted to copy Roxas' modernized plans for the fisheries system. Roxas, questioned on his two decades in government, responded that he is not a corrupt public official and pointed to his anticorruption efforts in the "Daang Matuwid" (Straight Path) program.

For his part, Mayor Duterte said that he wants to eliminate rice cartels and 5–6 (practice of loan sharks) loans in the farming system in just three days. He is willing to resign and put his life and honor as President at stake if he failed to improve the corruption and crime situation in the country within three to six months. Among his other plans for the farmers were supplying funds (via LandBank) and setting up food terminals, credit unions and cooperatives. Binay said the smuggling crisis is a symptom of a problem-starting, indecisive and ineffective leader, noting that the Mindanao problems, including the rotational brownouts, all stem from a lack of action by local officials.

=== Third round: Mindanao Issues ===
The order of candidates are determined by a draw.

Duterte noted that 60% of the infrastructure projects were from Metro Manila and just 19% were allocated to the Mindanao region, which contributes to the country's export and agriculture industry. Duterte reiterated that federalism is a solution to the issue on the Mindanao budget, vowing to end Manila-centrism in government. He points that the government should give Mindanao a larger share of taxes. Roxas on the rebuttal said that he would focus on the construction of bridges (particularly in Zamboanga del Sur); he made it clear that Mindanao has twice the amount of infrastructure projects in the 5 years of the Aquino administration, compared to the last 12 years of Estrada and Arroyo administrations. Duterte responded that there is no "Tuwid na Daan" (lit. Straight Path), reiterating that Mindanao has a small share of the national budget.

For Roxas, illegal drugs in the Philippines were a bigger societal problem. Roxas wanted to focus on arresting drug syndicates and cartels through the PDEA and the PNP's Lambat Sibat, a program which started when he was the DILG secretary and which saw 2 billion pesos worth of illegal drugs seized during his term. Anticorruption efforts, he noted, are also a weapon against illegal drugs. Binay, on the rebuttal, noted that the police has weak enforcement capacity against drug cartels due to ineffective leadership. The vice president added that he doesn't believe in death penalty. Roxas responded that there are two faces of Makati, a city for the rich (the Ayalas/Makati CBD) and a city for the poor. He added that barangays such as Comembo, Pembo and Rembo are the ones where illegal drug syndicates dominate, and the city has a high drug rate; drugs are rampant in high-end clubs and exclusive subdsivisions in Makati—even on Good Friday. Binay denied this and he said that illegal drugs are not Makati's problem.

Binay, who is part of a family belonging to a political dynasty, was asked regarding the prioritization of the passing of the Anti-Political Dynasty Bill. Binay remarked that it should be clarified which political dynasty is being referred to and that there are disagreements on what a political dynasty is. He said that a clean election, free from anomaly, is important, and a candidate shouldn't be barred from running just because the person has a relative in a political post. Santiago rebutted that the 1987 Constitution's anti-political dynasty provision should be literally applied but there is no law to implement it. She said that such a law has not been passed due to obstruction by politicians belonging to political dynasties. Binay pointed out to Santiago in his reply that Santiago's son served in an elected office. Santiago said that her son was only a party-list representative for one term and added that currently she has no relatives serving in an elected post.

Santiago opposed the passage of the Enhanced Defense Cooperation Agreement (EDCA), which was upheld by the Supreme Court, saying she believes that the executive department officials signed EDCA without giving a copy to the Senate; all foreign treaties should receive Senate approval. She also said that the Philippines should acquire more military equipment and engage in one-on-one talks with China to settle the dispute in the South China Sea. Poe agreed with Santiago's comment that EDCA should pass first in the Senate, adding that she seeks to strengthen the Armed Forces, comparing it to Singapore's modernized military, and wants talks to China and the ASEAN constructively regarding the South China Sea dispute, which Santiago also wanted.

Poe supported transparent and inclusive Mindanao peace talks and a formal peace covenant including all sectors, such as the MILF, MNLF, tribal groups, indigenous people, and the Christians in Mindanao. She also mentioned her plan to build a 70 billion-peso railway system in Mindanao and supported devolution of powers in the local government, an expanded budget for road infrastructure and tourism projects to provide jobs, and solving problems in electricity in Mindanao through the rehabilitation of Angus-Pulangi Dam and Hydroelectric Power Plant, which supplied power to much of Mindanao. Duterte reacts that there is a great threat in Mindanao, after the Bangsamoro Basic Law (BBL) failed to pass in the 15th Congress. He promised to offer the original version of the BBL and federalism to the Mindanao region.

=== Closing statements ===
The candidates gave their closing statement in alphabetical order as done in the opening statement and round 1. The program ended with all the candidates shaking hands for the country.

Binay said that the government should allocate and spend additional money in the national budget to jump-start development. Santiago clarified that the debate is not a popularity contest, but rather a voter-education campaign. She summarized the qualities of a real leader: academic, professional and moral excellence. Duterte said he is running for the presidency to show his love for the country and the people. He again reiterated that he is seeking to stop corruption in the government, as well as crime and drug syndicates, in just three to six months. Poe's closing statement reiterated her plans for the Mindanao region: sufficient power supply and monitoring of transmission grids, job creation, and fighting corruption. Poe said that her first order of business, if elected as president, is to pass the Freedom of Information Bill as the first executive order. Roxas assured the people that if elected as president, Filipinos would experience a more secure life, free from poverty, free from intimidation and free to express their dreams.

== Reception ==
=== COMELEC ===
Commission on Elections chairman Andres Bautista said he was "very satisfied" with the Mindanao debate, calling it a "world-class event both in terms of substance and form" and praising the 360-degree video technology devised by GMA. Bautista also urged Comelec's media partners in the succeeding debates to equal or exceed the viewership of the Mindanao debate, which he noted exceeded the number of viewers during boxing matches of Manny Pacquiao. Bautista also added that COMELEC was looking into adding more visual aids to prevent the debate from being a "boring sermon".

=== Social media ===
The hashtag #PiliPinasDebates2016 became the #1 trending topic in Twitter worldwide and the Philippines during the debate proper. Davao City mayor Rodrigo Duterte generated the most buzz on Facebook and Twitter, based on posts.

=== Ratings ===
The debate also topped the television ratings. AGB Nielsen Philippines Nationwide Urban Television Audience Measurement reported that the Mindanao leg got a 24.8% overnight household rating nationwide against ABS-CBN's Goin' Bulilit. It was also the top television program in the Urban Mindanao area for February 21, where it posted a 30.5% household rating.

Kantar Media Philippines also reported that the debate ranked among the top five most watched programs in Urban+Rural area nationwide, posting a 23.8% rating.

=== On duration and advertisements ===
Roxas said that there should have been more time for candidates to express their views, saying each candidate was only given about 15 minutes. Duterte had previously threatened to walk out from the debate if he was not given enough time to express his views. After the debate, Duterte reportedly requested the GMA hosts to extend the debate for almost two more hours, until 9pm. Liberal Party campaign spokesman Miro Quimbo compared the debate to Twitter, where messages are short. Binay, Poe, and Santiago were reportedly unsatisfied in regards to the time allotted to them in the debate.

Congressman Winston Castelo, while satisfied, urged for future debates to be commercial-free, noting that the commercials aired in between of the Mindanao debate defeated the objective of the debates to "enrich public knowledge" and stating that commercials should not be part of enhancing the process to "come out with intelligent choices". Some netizens also called for the limiting or removing of commercials in between the next debates in order to give more time to the candidates.

COMELEC revealed that GMA-7 said they did not profit from advertisements and that the poll body was given free commercial space for voter education.

=== By candidates ===
Rico Quicho, spokesman for the Binay campaign, called out what his camp describes as "inappropriate questioning" in the debate. He said that the question asked to Binay about the issue of political dynasties came in the third round, which was mostly about Mindanao issues. Quicho lamented that Binay was not given a chance to express his views regarding how poverty in Mindanao should be solved.

== See also ==
- List of programs broadcast by GMA Network
