= PiliPinas Debates 2016 – Visayas leg =

PiliPinas Debates 2016 (Visayas leg)
- Date: March 20, 2016
- Time: 4:30pm - 10:00pm (UTC+8) (Note: The debate proper was originally scheduled to start at 5:00pm (UTC+8) but was delayed due to a dispute regarding a rule. The debate started at 6:35pm (UTC+8). It was previously reported to supposedly last for two hours and twenty minutes, excluding 60 minutes of advertisements.)
- Duration: 119 minutes (Note: During the 160 minute broadcast from 6:30pm (UTC+8), 41 minutes were advertisement.This figure excludes the 90 minute delay from 5:00pm (UTC+8), where 3 minutes of time were spent on advertisements.)
- Venue: Performing Arts Hall, University of the Philippines Cebu College
- Location: Cebu City, Philippines; 10°19′21″N 123°53′57″E
- Type: Televised debate
- Organized by: COMELEC; KBP; TV5; Philippine Star; BusinessWorld
- Participants: Jejomar Binay; Rodrigo Duterte; Grace Poe; Mar Roxas
- Presenter: Luchi Cruz-Valdes (TV5)
- Preceded by: Mindanao leg
- Succeeded by: Luzon leg

The Visayas leg of the PiliPinas Debates 2016 is the second presidential debate of the 2016 Philippine elections, held at the Performing Arts Hall of the University of the Philippines in Cebu City on March 20, 2016. It was organized by COMELEC and KBP with TV5, Philippine Star, and BusinessWorld as media partners.

The debate was moderated by News5 chief Luchi Cruz-Valdes, along with panelists Ed Lingao and Lourd de Veyra of News5, Philippine Star editor-in-chief Ana Marie Pamintuan, Philippine Star associate editor Marichu Villanueva, Bloomberg TV Philippines host Atty. Tony Abad and RMN DYHP Cebu commentator Atty. Ruphil Bañoc. The program aired from 4:30pm – 10:00pm (UTC+8) due to delays caused by miscommunication between the camp of Jejomar Binay and moderator Luchi Cruz-Valdez.

Presidential candidate Senator Miriam Defensor Santiago decided to skip this debate to undertake clinical trials on a new anti-cancer drug.

== Broadcast and coverage ==
The debate aired live on TV5, AksyonTV, Bloomberg TV Philippines, Radyo5, KBP-affiliated radio stations nationwide and through the Bilang Pilipino website. As part of the event, TV5 launched the Showt instant online voting platform on the Bilang Pilipino website. Online users were able vote "Yes" or "No" to the candidates of their choice, and had to wait 60 seconds before voting again.

Sign language interpreters were hired for the first time in a Philippines presidential debate.

A live viewing party was organized by TV5 in the Bugsy’s Bar and Bistro in Bonifacio Global City, Taguig. Social media personalities were present at the event.

== Format ==
The format of the Visayas debate was to be different from the first debate in Mindanao, with a panel discussion for the first half and a one-on-one tossup in the second half. The Commission on Elections said that among the issues and topics to be discussed are climate change, education, women’s rights, and health.

This debate was planned to last one hour longer than the Mindanao leg, for a total of 2 hours and 20 minutes, with just 40 minutes of commercial breaks in response to complaints about the long commercial breaks in the Mindanao leg. Candidates also had more time to answer questions posed by the moderators.

Like the previous leg candidates were not allowed to bring notes with them at the podium. Dispute regarding the existence and nature of this rule caused a delay of the debate.

== Debate ==
=== Rules dispute and delay ===
The Visayas debate started with a commentary by Cheryl Cosim and Robie Alampay of TV5, lawyer Mel Santa Maria, and Dindo Manhit, a professor from De la Salle University, at 4:30pm (UTC+8) but this was extended by about an hour and a half; viewers of the TV5 broadcast on social media expressed their frustrations through their comments questioning the delay of the debate proper which originally scheduled to start at 5:00pm (UTC+8). The cause of the delay was later made known to the wider public: a dispute regarding the bringing of notes by candidates on the podium.

Binay arrived on stage at 6:05pm (UTC+8) while other candidates were already present. Binay insisted that he should be allowed to bring notes, while Roxas' camp protested. TV5 Network then issued an official public apology for the delay saying that there was a miscommunication between Binay's camp and Luchi Cruz-Valdez. Before the start of the debate proper, Cruz-Valdez said that four or five days before the debate, Toby Tiangco called her to inquire about the rule on behalf of Binay. Unaware of the existence of such a rule regarding the matter, Cruz-Valdez told Tiangco that notes were allowed. The debate proper started at 6:35pm (UTC+8).

The events that transpired on stage during the delay were broadcast by TV5 after the debate proper.

=== First round ===
The first round followed a modified panel format, where journalists asked questions to the candidates.

=== Second round ===
The candidates were given a chance to ask a question of their choice to another candidates.

=== Taas-Kamay ===
In a special segment of the debate dubbed as Taas-Kamay (lit. Hands Up), candidates were asked on issues and whether or not they agreed, signified by raising their hands. Santiago participated in this portion of the debate via Twitter.

Issue	Binay	Duterte	Poe	Roxas	Santiago (Note: Miriam Santiago, while not physically present at the debate, participated in the Taas-Kamay portion through Twitter. Santiago explained that she supports divorce on the grounds of preventing attempts on the life of a spouse by the other, adultery and/or concubinage, and that she supports the death penalty for drug traffickers while maintaining that the justice system must be improved. There was no tweet retrieved regarding Santiago's view on Marcos' burial. Since she was not technically part of the debate, she was not bound to the no explanation clause of the debate portion.)
Legalization of Divorce	No	No	No	No	Yes
Return of Death Penalty	No	Yes	Yes	No	Yes
Burial of Ferdinand Marcos at the Libingan ng mga Bayani	Yes	Yes	No	No	—N/a

== Symposium ==
A symposium titled "WiseUP Cebu" was held before the debate from around 3:00pm – 5:30pm (UTC+8) on the same day as the debate. Event manager Gregg Loren said that the focus of the event was on the candidates' platforms, relevant priorities and personalities.

The administration of former President Ferdinand Marcos and the party-list system were also subjects at WiseUP Cebu.

An online symposium was conducted on the day of the debate at the UP Cebu Jogging Field and streamed live over the Bilang Pilipino website. The symposium was hosted by TV5 personalities Jun Sabayton and Bea Benedicto.

== Reception ==
=== Academics ===
Jan Robert Go, an assistant professor of political science at the University of the Philippines said that the debates ended up as not being platform-based with the participants focused more on "bashing" and "mudslinging". Go said that debates were able to reveal the candidates' characters on how they answered and asked questions. He commented that the delay affected the mood of the debate.
