= PiliPinas Debates 2016 – Metro Manila leg =

PiliPinas Debates 2016 (Metro Manila leg)
- Date: April 10, 2016
- Time: 5:00 p.m. - 8:20 p.m. (PST)
- Duration: 128 minutes
- Venue: Quadricentennial Pavilion, University of Santo Tomas
- Location: Manila, Philippines; 14°36′33.80″N 120°59′28″E
- Type: Televised debate
- Organized by: COMELEC; KBP; CNN Philippines; Business Mirror
- Participants: Alan Peter Cayetano; Francis Escudero; Gregorio Honasan; Bongbong Marcos; Leni Robredo; Antonio Trillanes
- Moderators: Pia Hontiveros; Pinky Webb (CNN Philippines)
- Panelists: Ina Andolong (CNN Philippines) David Santos (CNN Philippines); John Mangun (Business Mirror); Andrew Stevens (CNN International); Kristie Lu Stout (CNN International) Ivan Watson (CNN International)

The Metro Manila leg of the PiliPinas Debates 2016 is the first vice presidential televised debate of the 2016 Philippine elections and the only VP debate under the PiliPinas Debates series, held at the Quadricentennial Pavilion at the University of Santo Tomas in Manila on April 10, 2016. It was organized by COMELEC and KBP with CNN Philippines, and Business Mirror as media partners. The debate was moderated by CNN Philippines chief correspondent Pia Hontiveros and senior anchor Pinky Webb. The coverage also included a pre-debate show and post-debate analysis anchored by Amelyn Veloso with panelists Atty. Karen Jimeno, Nicole Curato and Dindo Manhit.

The debate proper took around 128 minutes and there were 7 commercial breaks during the program which had a combined duration of 42 minutes.

PiliPinas 2016 The Vice Presidential Debates with a replay on the following day on TV5.

== Debate proper ==
=== Yes or No portion ===
Here are the six vice-presidentiables stand on country's issues. Each candidate used the "thumbs up" sign if he/she agrees, and "thumbs down" sign if he/she disagrees.

Issues	Cayetano	Escudero	Honasan	Marcos	Robredo	Trillanes
Engaging in corrupt activities?	No	No	No	No	No	No
Death penalty for corruption	Yes	No	No	No	No	No
Belonging to political dynasty	Yes	Yes	No	Yes	No	No
Favor of anti-dynasty law	Yes	Yes	Yes	Yes	Yes	Yes
Same-sex marriage	No	No	No	No	No	No
Is the Philippines doing enough to address climate change?	No	No	No	No	No	No
Reduce income tax	Yes	Yes	Yes	Yes	Yes	Yes
Make TelCos accountable for internet problems	Yes	Yes	Yes	Yes	Yes	Yes
Future plans to run for president	No	No	No	No	No	—N/a

== Reception ==
=== Social media ===
Social media users from Twitter gave their good reviews on the debates on the outcome of the well organized debate produced by CNN Philippines. Netizens also took their high praises for both Hontiveros and Webb for carefully handled and moderated the debate proceedings.

== See also ==
- List of programs broadcast by CNN Philippines
