= Congressional canvass for the 2016 Philippine presidential election =

The following is the official canvassing of votes by the Congress of the Philippines for the 2016 Philippine presidential and vice presidential election. The canvassing started on May 25, 2016 and ended 2 days later. This was the fastest congressional canvassing process in Philippine electoral history since 1998 until 2022.

The Congress is mandated to declare a winner 30 days after the elections (June 8).

== Process ==
After voters had finished voting, the counting machines will then count the votes received by each candidate in each position. For positions elected on a national basis (president, vice president, senators and party-list representatives), the counting machine will then print an election return for that precinct, and will transmit the results to the municipal/city board of canvassers, Congress, Commission on Elections, the citizen's arm authorized by the commission, political parties, and others.

The city or municipality will then tally the votes for all positions and will issue two documents at its conclusion: a statement of votes where the votes obtained by candidates in each precinct in a city/municipality is stated; and a certificate of canvass (COC), a document in electronic and printed form containing the total votes in figures obtained by each candidate in the city or municipality. The city or municipal COC will either be sent electronically to Congress (if the city is an Independent city with its own legislative district) or to the provincial board of canvassers in which the process is repeated; this time the provincial COC will be sent to Congress.

Congress, sitting as the National Board of Canvassers, will canvass the votes to determine who among the candidates are elected president and vice president.

In theory, all of the votes from the election returns when added must be equal to the votes canvassed by Congress coming from the city/provincial COCs.

The provincial/city board of canvassers will send an electronically transmitted COC to the Congress' Consolidation and Canvassing System (CCS) server, which was activated minutes after voting closed on May 9. Meanwhile, the manually counted and physically delivered COCs from the provincial and/or city board of canvassers will be sent first to the Senate then it will be brought to the Batasang Pambansa Complex, the home of the House of Representatives upon the convening of both the Senate and the House of Representatives in a joint session.

The canvassing committee will tabulate the results of each COC in the order they were received electronically in the Consolidation and Canvassing System (CCS) and physically delivered to Congress for manually prepared COCs with no electronic transmission.

The committee will then compare the electronically received COC from the physically delivered COC for any discrepancy. In cases of discrepancies, Congress may summon the chairperson of the provincial/city board of canvassers from where city/province the COC came from. For overseas absentee voting COCs, the board of canvassers may be contacted through any forms of communication deemed safe and reliable by the committee.

After all of the COCs were canvassed, the joint committee will furnish a report to be approved by majority vote by both House and Senate voting separately.

== Members of the canvassing committee ==
Instead of the whole Congress canvassing the votes, a committee comprised evenly between the Senate and the House of Representatives will canvass the votes at the Batasang Pambansa Complex in Quezon City, the home of the House of Representatives. Senator Aquilino Pimentel III and House Majority Leader Neptali Gonzales II will co-chair the proceedings instead of Senate President Franklin Drilon and the House Speaker Feliciano Belmonte, Jr. Previously, the Senate President and the House Speaker played this role. The composition of the joint congressional canvassing committee was announced on May 24, 2016.

Senate	Position	House of Representatives
Aquilino Pimentel III (PDP–Laban)	Co-chairpersons	House Majority Leader Neptali Gonzales II (Mandaluyong, Liberal)
Senate President pro tempore Ralph Recto (Liberal); Senate Minority Leader Juan Ponce Enrile (UNA); Sonny Angara (LDP); TG Guingona (Liberal); Sergio Osmeña III (independent); Tito Sotto (NPC)	Members	Elpidio Barzaga, Jr. (Cavite, NUP); Silvestre Bello III (Party-list, 1-BAP); Fredenil Castro (Capiz, NUP); Romero Quimbo (Marikina, Liberal); Rufus Rodriguez (Cagayan de Oro, CDP); Reynaldo Umali (Oriental Mindoro, Liberal)
Cynthia Villar (Nacionalista); JV Ejercito (UNA)	Alternates	House Minority Leader Ronaldo Zamora (San Juan, Nacionalista); Rolando Andaya, Jr. (Camarines Sur, NPC); Ibarra Gutierrez (Party-list, Akbayan); Oscar Rodriguez (Pampanga, Liberal)

Members of Congress who ran for president (Grace Poe and Miriam Defensor Santiago) and vice president (Alan Peter Cayetano, Francis Escudero, Gregorio Honasan, Bongbong Marcos, Leni Robredo and Antonio Trillanes) are banned from attending the proceedings.

Each political party is entitled to two lawyers who may file motions before Congress. All presidential candidates and 4 vice presidential candidates (except Honasan and Trillanes) have lawyers for the canvassing period.

== Proceedings ==
Date	Scheduled start	Actual start	Ended	COCs canvassed
May 25	2:00 p.m.	2:57 p.m.	9:30 p.m.	45
May 26	2:00 p.m.	2:27 p.m.	10:00 p.m.	68
May 27	2:00 p.m.	2:30 p.m.	7:16 p.m.	53

=== May 25 ===
On May 25, before the start of canvassing, Didagen Dilangalen, lawyer of Bongbong Marcos, requested for separate canvassing of presidential and vice presidential results. This motion was made for an early proclamation of presumptive president Rodrigo Duterte and for more thorough examination of the tight vice presidential race. The joint committee rejected his motion and proceeded on canvassing on a per certificate of canvass (COC) basis. Davao del Sur's COC was first canvassed. Discrepancies of COCs of Davao del Norte, Ilocos Sur and Laguna were found and their results were deferred. The Provincial Board of Canvassers of these provinces were summoned to address these issues. The committee have admitted for canvassing a total of 45 COCs from 20 provinces, 15 cities, 1 district and 9 countries.

=== May 26 ===
On May 26, the camp of Davao City mayor Rodrigo Duterte urged Bongbong Marcos to convince his running mate, Miriam Defensor Santiago to concede in the presidential race so that it would hasten the canvassing and the proclamation of Duterte as the President. Discrepancies of COCs of Antique were found and their results were deferred, while the canvassing of COCs from Kuwait and Canada were suspended since the physically delivered COCs were not yet delivered to Congress and their respective electronically transmitted COCs are only available. The Certificate of Canvass for Iloilo City was not found inside the ballot boxes sent to Congress and ordered the chairperson of the Iloilo City Board of Canvassers to appear on May 27. The COCs for Davao del Norte, Ilocos Sur and Laguna were admitted to the canvass after their respective PBOC chairpersons appeared to the committee and explained the discrepancies. In total, the joint committee admitted to canvass 69 CoCs from 54 provinces, 8 cities, and 6 countries.

=== May 27 ===
The committee first resumed consideration for the canvassing the COCs for Antique, Kuwait, and Iloilo City. The Antique COC was admitted for canvassing after the chairman of the provincial board of canvassers appeared before the joint committee to explain the discrepancies. The COC from Kuwait has been delivered by Comelec representatives before the joint committee convened. The COC for Iloilo City were canvassed after the chairperson of its city board of canvassers located the COC inside the ballot box that were sent to Congress. For the COC from Canada, the Comelec representative explained that the physical COC was only shipped on May 26 and it will take about three to five days before it will be delivered to Congress. However, they have a certified true copy of the COC, which Comelec received via e-mail. This was also the case for the COC from Austria. The committee finished the canvassing of all electronically transmitted and manually prepared COCs (including the local absentee and detainee voting COCs) in three days, the fastest canvassing of results for President and Vice President in Philippine election history.

== Presidential election ==
Based on the official canvass of the Congress of the Philippines.

Candidate	Party	Votes	%
Rodrigo Duterte	PDP–Laban	16,601,997	39.02
Mar Roxas	Liberal Party	9,978,175	23.45
Grace Poe	Independent	9,100,991	21.39
Jejomar Binay	United Nationalist Alliance	5,416,140	12.73
Miriam Defensor Santiago	People's Reform Party	1,455,532	3.42
Total		42,552,835	100.00
Valid votes		42,552,835	94.61
Invalid/blank votes (Note: Includes 25,779 votes for Roy Señeres (Partido ng Manggagawa at Magsasaka) who withdrew and died after the ballots were printed.)		2,426,316	5.39
Total votes		44,979,151	100.00
Registered voters/turnout		55,739,911	80.69
Source: Congress

Province/City/ Absentee voters	Duterte		Roxas		Poe		Binay		Santiago		Señeres (Note: Votes for Roy Señeres are considered invalid.)
Province/City/ Absentee voters	Votes	%	Votes	%	Votes	%	Votes	%	Votes	%	Votes
Abra	24,120	18.57	11,050	8.51	37,029	28.52	50,245	38.69	7,411	5.71	77
Agusan del Norte	195,814	57.65	76,267	22.45	53,879	15.86	11,559	3.40	2,135	0.63	154
Agusan del Sur	115,869	40.15	150,613	52.18	13,847	4.80	7,329	2.54	968	0.34	195
Aklan	52,481	18.88	134,763	48.47	53,360	19.19	30,996	11.15	6,407	2.30	190
Albay	80,361	13.34	221,778	36.81	221,578	36.78	63,144	10.48	15,595	2.59	599
Antique	45,520	18.24	102,311	40.99	61,572	24.67	31,675	12.69	8,538	3.42	293
Apayao	7,056	14.26	8,215	16.60	10,439	21.10	22,239	44.95	1,529	3.09	36
Aurora	19,149	19.35	16,029	16.20	33,776	34.14	27,290	27.58	2,699	2.73	63
Bacolod	69,871	30.99	106,268	47.13	32,443	14.39	6,597	2.93	10,296	4.57	132
Baguio	37,768	33.16	15,731	13.81	24,569	21.57	9,079	7.97	26,735	23.48	96
Basilan	95,625	53.62	56,881	31.89	15,512	8.70	9,747	5.47	581	0.33	48
Bataan	145,902	36.41	42,504	10.61	144,540	36.07	50,640	12.64	17,133	4.28	132
Batanes	1,107	12.12	3,690	40.39	2,984	32.66	1,181	12.93	175	1.92	3
Batangas	336,974	27.53	215,266	17.59	334,379	27.32	294,510	24.06	42,921	3.51	425
Benguet	30,948	18.65	39,374	23.73	54,543	32.87	13,437	8.10	27,648	16.66	16
Biliran	30,712	39.08	21,060	26.80	10,901	13.87	14,885	18.94	1,038	1.32	84
Bohol	315,596	49.53	203,628	31.95	68,912	10.81	42,917	6.73	6,191	0.97	441
Bukidnon	345,677	58.42	129,057	21.81	88,551	14.97	24,053	4.07	4,359	0.74	500
Bulacan	506,046	38.00	187,710	14.10	418,962	31.46	157,788	11.85	61,121	4.59	658
Cagayan	89,180	17.87	64,765	12.97	100,623	20.16	228,041	45.68	16,577	3.32	338
Cagayan de Oro	164,446	66.70	27,416	11.12	34,509	14.00	17,354	7.04	2,833	1.15	102
Caloocan	232,918	46.10	69,143	13.68	116,128	22.98	59,070	11.69	28,010	5.54	269
Camarines Norte	40,000	16.56	64,444	26.68	114,239	47.29	18,555	7.68	4,308	1.78	233
Camarines Sur	98,236	12.41	305,670	38.62	276,855	34.98	97,232	12.29	13,439	1.70	591
Camiguin	11,285	23.53	35,613	74.26	625	1.30	326	0.68	109	0.23	13
Capiz	35,443	9.95	274,023	76.92	22,702	6.37	19,322	5.42	4,740	1.33	302
Catanduanes	20,486	14.45	39,353	27.76	58,612	41.34	20,621	14.54	2,711	1.91	179
Cavite	557,812	41.18	232,427	17.16	297,681	21.98	196,228	14.49	70,325	5.19	538
Cebu	762,559	50.70	459,089	30.52	192,235	12.78	70,867	4.71	19,386	1.29	1,023
Cebu City	296,246	58.85	90,420	17.96	52,169	10.36	51,002	10.13	13,512	2.68	226
Compostela Valley	255,555	76.18	55,184	16.45	17,758	5.29	5,889	1.76	1,095	0.33	133
Cotabato	397,096	75.47	69,490	13.21	35,109	6.67	22,137	4.21	2,347	0.45	196
Davao City	614,192	96.60	7,546	1.19	9,053	1.42	3,329	0.52	1,671	0.26	64
Davao del Norte	398,192	92.52	13,654	3.17	12,545	2.91	4,803	1.12	1,171	0.27	111
Davao del Sur	269,660	91.60	12,714	4.32	8,264	2.81	3,013	1.02	750	0.25	74
Davao Occidental	94,373	86.19	6,371	5.82	6,341	5.79	2,138	1.95	275	0.25	42
Davao Oriental	208,059	82.90	22,676	9.03	13,460	5.36	5,788	2.31	997	0.40	142
Dinagat Islands	33,395	63.09	11,935	22.55	3,557	6.72	3,838	7.25	205	0.39	19
Eastern Samar	46,298	19.92	80,824	34.77	72,778	31.31	29,073	12.51	3,501	1.51	226
Guimaras	9,059	10.45	50,507	58.26	11,939	13.77	12,527	14.45	2,654	3.06	56
Ifugao	11,685	13.18	25,452	28.72	25,629	28.92	21,263	23.99	4,606	5.20	76
Iligan	85,901	71.37	16,618	13.81	12,464	10.36	4,331	3.60	1,047	0.87	41
Ilocos Norte	103,394	33.57	13,162	4.27	61,012	19.81	66,007	21.43	64,375	20.90	253
Ilocos Sur	86,364	25.37	52,868	15.53	89,925	26.41	66,460	19.52	44,857	13.17	223
Iloilo	107,364	12.42	543,001	62.82	137,393	15.90	31,647	3.66	44,940	5.20	607
Iloilo City	39,680	18.72	119,972	56.60	31,159	14.70	6,141	2.90	15,011	7.08	150
Isabela	119,259	16.66	68,473	9.57	139,637	19.51	372,371	52.03	16,008	2.24	332
Kalinga	13,361	13.85	13,142	13.62	26,746	27.72	38,517	39.93	4,703	4.88	63
La Union	85,988	22.66	39,523	10.41	111,253	29.31	106,449	28.05	36,301	9.57	220
Laguna	454,593	36.03	175,922	13.94	386,241	30.62	180,338	14.29	64,478	5.11	607
Lanao del Norte	126,052	52.62	69,375	28.96	25,835	10.78	17,239	7.20	1,073	0.45	137
Lanao del Sur	303,184	80.16	44,801	11.84	15,809	4.18	13,635	3.60	815	0.22	71
Lapu-Lapu	83,283	55.41	44,676	29.73	15,951	10.61	3,719	2.47	2,663	1.77	112
Las Piñas	104,387	47.33	28,923	13.11	52,983	24.02	17,654	8.01	16,589	7.52	108
Leyte	332,306	37.32	222,276	24.96	128,643	14.45	190,865	21.43	16,382	1.84	724
Maguindanao	255,031	55.51	117,851	25.65	22,006	4.79	63,569	13.84	964	0.21	115
Makati	89,047	28.78	40,067	12.95	25,661	8.29	133,367	43.10	21,291	6.88	87
Malabon	66,125	44.06	20,147	13.43	39,862	26.56	15,384	10.25	8,545	5.69	103
Mandaluyong	63,860	41.80	22,069	14.45	28,731	18.81	26,330	17.24	11,777	7.71	54
Manila	325,050	43.41	88,047	11.76	180,170	24.06	96,997	12.95	58,535	7.82	366
Marikina	76,393	42.88	35,559	19.96	39,209	22.01	11,550	6.48	15,448	8.67	67
Marinduque	22,352	20.11	26,164	23.54	45,125	40.59	15,387	13.84	2,133	1.92	102
Masbate	64,086	18.95	150,128	44.39	78,587	23.24	41,954	12.41	3,433	1.02	517
Misamis Occidental	109,812	39.80	137,015	49.66	18,616	6.75	8,785	3.18	1,658	0.60	182
Misamis Oriental	237,184	53.49	99,402	22.42	68,238	15.39	35,480	8.00	3,103	0.70	264
Mountain Province	9,111	12.36	18,973	25.74	22,553	30.59	15,122	20.51	7,965	10.80	60
Muntinlupa	94,012	42.72	35,651	16.20	44,123	20.05	33,221	15.10	13,062	5.94	83
Navotas	35,890	35.83	6,820	6.81	18,974	18.94	34,428	34.37	4,066	4.06	36
Negros Occidental	190,196	18.07	579,810	55.10	222,440	21.14	39,786	3.78	20,100	1.91	1,200
Negros Oriental	173,968	30.73	248,099	43.83	86,406	15.26	48,474	8.56	9,162	1.62	748
Northern Samar	42,157	14.64	100,436	34.89	74,021	25.71	67,655	23.50	3,600	1.25	338
Nueva Ecija	275,136	27.56	148,269	14.85	326,715	32.73	221,135	22.15	26,946	2.70	438
Nueva Vizcaya	40,656	21.11	24,374	12.66	60,468	31.40	58,773	30.52	8,296	4.31	109
Occidental Mindoro	38,701	20.65	72,644	38.76	36,171	19.30	37,886	20.21	2,024	1.08	116
Oriental Mindoro	70,560	20.43	104,554	30.27	104,772	30.33	60,246	17.44	5,266	1.52	197
Palawan	104,410	23.92	168,592	38.63	126,181	28.91	30,392	6.96	6,838	1.57	432
Pampanga	433,969	42.50	141,715	13.88	238,866	23.39	159,753	15.64	46,827	4.59	535
Pangasinan	346,081	24.98	204,081	14.73	572,249	41.30	210,876	15.22	52,258	3.77	913
Parañaque	99,940	44.09	41,625	18.36	42,879	18.92	27,055	11.94	15,166	6.69	120
Pasay	81,472	41.93	26,119	13.44	30,185	15.54	44,232	22.76	12,295	6.33	85
Pasig	136,007	42.83	50,175	15.80	75,880	23.89	31,529	9.93	23,993	7.55	141
Quezon	184,950	20.70	205,791	23.04	305,814	34.23	175,002	19.59	21,768	2.44	553
Quezon City	415,671	46.31	164,012	18.27	168,432	18.77	82,438	9.18	66,982	7.46	457
Quirino	14,750	18.86	21,008	26.86	17,290	22.10	22,978	29.37	2,197	2.81	41
Rizal	415,816	40.92	134,038	13.19	259,998	25.59	150,030	14.77	56,164	5.53	483
Romblon	26,134	19.51	56,369	42.08	31,736	23.69	17,868	13.34	1,842	1.38	86
Samar	68,206	17.81	129,660	33.85	115,582	30.17	64,575	16.86	5,030	1.31	289
San Juan	25,922	45.35	9,061	15.85	11,508	20.13	5,833	10.20	4,837	8.46	34
Sarangani	141,511	67.57	22,972	10.97	16,983	8.11	27,084	12.93	883	0.42	112
Siquijor	16,252	29.26	26,626	47.94	5,256	9.46	6,778	12.20	623	1.12	44
Sorsogon	44,560	12.94	108,068	31.38	143,420	41.64	42,636	12.38	5,716	1.66	373
South Cotabato	349,904	61.18	121,170	21.18	64,115	11.21	31,512	5.51	5,265	0.92	215
Southern Leyte	93,625	45.67	73,499	35.85	20,007	9.76	15,955	7.78	1,933	0.94	149
Sultan Kudarat	174,317	61.62	59,212	20.93	29,464	10.42	18,240	6.45	1,651	0.58	133
Sulu	197,559	76.72	26,443	10.27	9,455	3.67	23,666	9.19	389	0.15	35
Surigao del Norte	148,387	57.72	59,778	23.25	38,706	15.06	8,667	3.37	1,547	0.60	172
Surigao del Sur	186,077	65.11	58,673	20.53	30,947	10.83	8,660	3.03	1,444	0.51	164
Taguig–Pateros	166,834	58.67	25,330	8.91	42,473	14.94	33,454	11.76	16,272	5.72	114
Tarlac	159,187	26.31	194,974	32.23	185,918	30.73	47,177	7.80	17,675	2.92	356
Tawi-Tawi	69,344	54.41	26,413	20.73	12,398	9.73	18,957	14.87	331	0.26	51
Valenzuela	113,745	43.30	30,845	11.74	80,671	30.71	20,361	7.75	17,045	6.49	106
Zambales	103,274	28.54	67,366	18.62	132,705	36.67	37,309	10.31	21,217	5.86	202
Zamboanga City	107,565	40.65	43,031	16.26	84,728	32.02	22,201	8.39	7,068	2.67	221
Zamboanga del Norte	174,548	39.13	175,008	39.24	53,122	11.91	40,806	9.15	2,563	0.57	394
Zamboanga del Sur	141,065	35.70	81,348	20.59	149,570	37.85	20,058	5.08	3,073	0.78	381
Zamboanga Sibugay	115,173	46.18	84,151	33.74	34,385	13.79	14,291	5.73	1,422	0.57	194
Local absentee voters	10,283	54.24	1,419	7.48	1,628	8.59	4,375	23.08	1,253	6.61	2
Detainee voters	387	17.68	331	15.12	896	40.93	549	25.08	26	1.19	4
Argentina	41	58.57	12	17.14	11	15.71	2	2.86	4	5.71	0
Australia	1,889	57.75	768	23.48	266	8.13	57	1.74	291	8.90	1
Austria	561	63.25	167	18.83	65	7.33	18	2.03	76	8.57	0
Bahrain	5,413	75.10	712	9.88	405	5.62	169	2.34	509	7.06	3
Bangladesh	168	61.31	48	17.52	18	6.57	9	3.28	31	11.31	0
Belgium	729	62.25	229	19.56	100	8.54	20	1.71	93	7.94	0
Brazil	201	76.72	22	8.40	12	4.58	9	3.44	18	6.87	0
Brunei	3,147	76.57	339	8.25	228	5.55	65	1.58	331	8.05	0
Cambodia	715	70.93	123	12.20	54	5.36	14	1.39	102	10.12	0
Canada	15,643	69.43	2,681	11.90	1,582	7.02	397	1.76	2,227	9.88	7
Chile	196	71.53	15	5.47	11	4.01	6	2.19	46	16.79	0
China	34,004	66.77	4,927	9.67	3,173	6.23	1,252	2.46	7,573	14.87	12
Czech Republic	183	74.09	26	10.53	5	2.02	3	1.21	30	12.15	0
Egypt	715	74.32	88	9.15	62	6.44	29	3.01	68	7.07	0
France	1,123	62.32	354	19.64	149	8.27	25	1.39	151	8.38	0
Germany	1,206	63.47	281	14.79	174	9.16	63	3.32	176	9.26	2
Greece	1,470	60.05	253	10.33	274	11.19	108	4.41	343	14.01	2
Guam	1,490	45.23	1,030	31.27	515	15.63	95	2.88	164	4.98	0
Hungary	185	69.81	8	3.02	21	7.92	5	1.89	46	17.36	0
India	42	65.63	11	17.19	3	4.69	3	4.69	5	7.81	0
Indonesia	951	62.08	287	18.73	68	4.44	27	1.76	199	12.99	0
Iran	62	66.67	9	9.68	12	12.90	3	3.23	7	7.53	0
Israel	4,431	77.30	323	5.64	250	4.36	99	1.73	629	10.97	2
Italy	9,249	66.47	1,859	13.36	1,276	9.17	322	2.31	1,209	8.69	6
Japan	11,216	76.47	1,274	8.69	829	5.65	269	1.83	1,080	7.36	9
Jordan	1,516	74.31	147	7.21	168	8.24	45	2.21	164	8.04	0
Kenya	292	70.02	37	8.87	44	10.55	12	2.88	32	7.67	0
Kuwait	9,747	80.09	1,021	8.39	598	4.91	224	1.84	580	4.77	3
Laos	455	74.23	43	7.01	15	2.45	21	3.43	79	12.89	0
Lebanon	3,039	73.58	271	6.56	359	8.69	135	3.27	326	7.89	2
Malaysia	2,275	74.54	210	6.88	122	4.00	62	2.03	383	12.55	3
Mexico	179	69.38	40	15.50	7	2.71	5	1.94	27	10.47	0
Myanmar	127	56.70	51	22.77	11	4.91	6	2.68	29	12.95	0
Netherlands	573	70.57	103	12.68	55	6.77	9	1.11	72	8.87	0
New Zealand	2,269	77.47	264	9.01	119	4.06	34	1.16	243	8.30	0
Nigeria	255	75.00	38	11.18	15	4.41	5	1.47	27	7.94	0
Norway	1,314	77.11	144	8.45	79	4.64	15	0.88	152	8.92	0
Oman	2,779	73.46	436	11.53	217	5.74	67	1.77	284	7.51	0
Pakistan	184	75.72	24	9.88	9	3.70	6	2.47	20	8.23	0
Papua New Guinea	588	61.25	225	23.44	65	6.77	22	2.29	60	6.25	1
Poland	120	68.97	25	14.37	6	3.45	3	1.72	20	11.49	0
Portugal	343	76.05	31	6.87	32	7.10	19	4.21	26	5.76	0
Qatar	12,475	79.90	1,333	8.54	558	3.57	250	1.60	997	6.39	2
Russia	753	75.30	61	6.10	41	4.10	11	1.10	134	13.40	1
Saudi Arabia	35,713	76.57	4,890	10.48	2,515	5.39	934	2.00	2,589	5.55	11
Singapore	30,389	77.09	3,746	9.50	1,276	3.24	424	1.08	3,587	9.10	7
South Africa	217	69.77	40	12.86	13	4.18	13	4.18	28	9.00	0
South Korea	2,915	84.22	160	4.62	84	2.43	28	0.81	274	7.92	0
Spain	4,170	70.75	531	9.01	452	7.67	131	2.22	610	10.35	1
Switzerland	1,729	59.62	588	20.28	224	7.72	68	2.34	291	10.03	1
Taiwan	11,544	88.44	343	2.63	319	2.44	122	0.93	725	5.55	1
Thailand	2,604	75.19	342	9.88	93	2.69	40	1.16	384	11.09	1
Timor-Leste	299	71.19	46	10.95	26	6.19	6	1.43	43	10.24	2
Turkey	492	74.89	50	7.61	37	5.63	9	1.37	69	10.50	0
United Arab Emirates	51,879	83.89	3,985	6.44	1,708	2.76	786	1.27	3,483	5.63	9
United Kingdom	6,451	65.30	1,491	15.09	685	6.93	192	1.94	1,060	10.73	3
United States	24,789	50.74	12,820	26.24	5,480	11.22	1,423	2.91	4,339	8.88	20
Vatican City	74	29.96	98	39.68	43	17.41	12	4.86	20	8.10	0
Vietnam	280	64.81	70	16.20	20	4.63	6	1.39	56	12.96	0
Total	16,601,997	39.02	9,978,175	23.45	9,100,991	21.39	5,416,140	12.73	1,455,532	3.42	25,779

== Vice presidential election ==
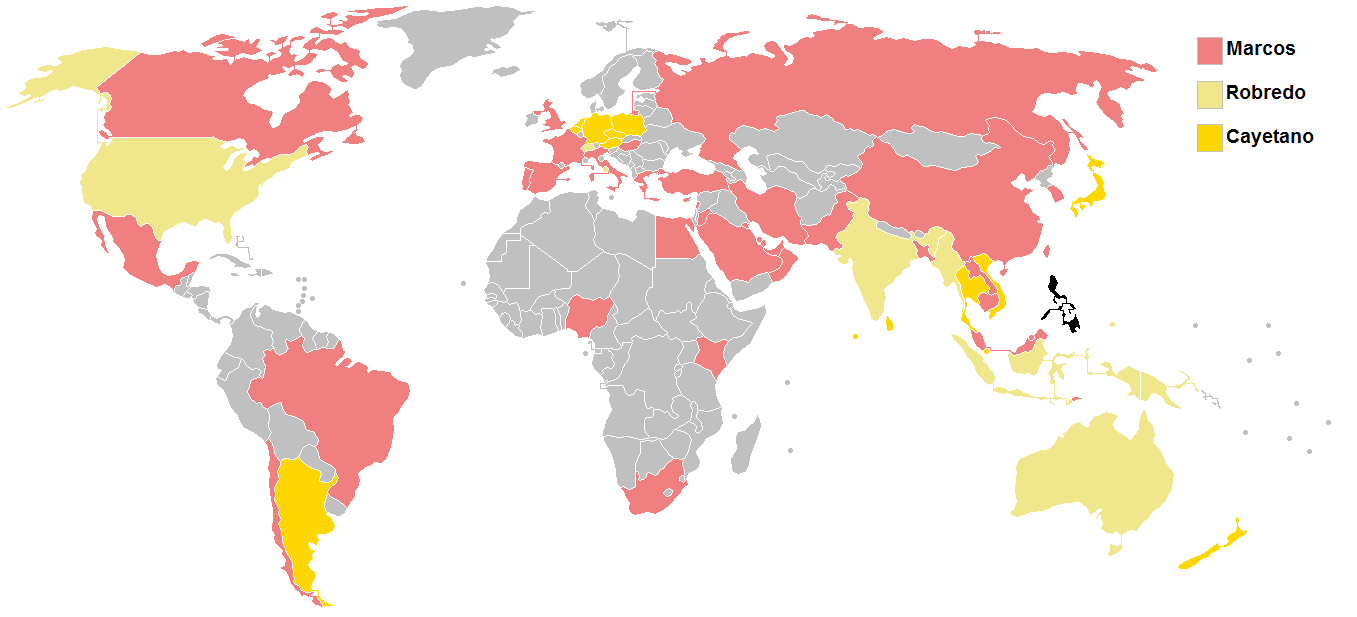
Overseas breakdown of the vice presidential election

Based on the official canvass of the Congress of the Philippines.

Candidate	Party	Votes	%
Leni Robredo	Liberal Party	14,418,817	35.11
Bongbong Marcos (Note: Running mate of Miriam Defensor Santiago (People's Reform Party))	Independent (Note: Nacionalista Party member running as an independent)	14,155,344	34.47
Alan Peter Cayetano (Note: Running mate of Rodrigo Duterte (PDP–Laban))	Independent	5,903,379	14.38
Francis Escudero (Note: Running mate of Grace Poe (independent))	Independent	4,931,962	12.01
Antonio Trillanes (Note: Supporting Grace Poe (independent))	Independent	868,501	2.11
Gregorio Honasan	United Nationalist Alliance	788,881	1.92
Total		41,066,884	100.00
Valid votes		41,066,884	91.30
Invalid/blank votes		3,912,267	8.70
Total votes		44,979,151	100.00
Registered voters/turnout		55,739,911	80.69
Source: Congress

Province/City/ Absentee voters	Robredo		Marcos		Cayetano		Escudero		Trillanes		Honasan	
Province/City/ Absentee voters	Votes	%	Votes	%	Votes	%	Votes	%	Votes	%	Votes	%
Abra	5,457	4.32	112,694	89.24	1,754	1.39	4,212	3.34	689	0.55	1,470	1.16
Agusan del Norte	116,063	36.12	82,696	25.74	86,548	26.94	28,313	8.81	3,676	1.14	4,004	1.25
Agusan del Sur	151,451	54.53	48,494	17.46	51,594	18.58	18,595	6.70	3,435	1.24	4,162	1.50
Aklan	148,280	55.51	51,395	19.24	19,225	7.20	34,428	12.89	8,411	3.15	5,373	2.01
Albay	380,745	64.71	42,324	7.19	23,713	4.03	117,113	19.90	17,095	2.91	7,434	1.26
Antique	119,055	50.66	44,663	19.00	17,002	7.23	33,578	14.29	15,011	6.39	5,722	2.43
Apayao	2,762	5.76	40,846	85.21	876	1.83	1,979	4.13	566	1.18	904	1.89
Aurora	27,029	27.88	42,600	43.94	4,479	4.62	16,684	17.21	2,698	2.78	3,453	3.56
Bacolod	119,447	54.11	42,923	19.45	28,132	12.74	19,854	8.99	8,319	3.77	2,064	0.94
Baguio	21,341	18.79	76,009	66.92	5,965	5.25	6,990	6.15	2,235	1.97	1,048	0.92
Basilan	77,321	46.71	32,326	19.53	31,868	19.25	16,488	9.96	3,412	2.06	4,104	2.48
Bataan	84,241	21.57	184,670	47.28	27,632	7.07	80,197	20.53	7,121	1.82	6,741	1.73
Batanes	4,566	51.93	1,079	12.27	416	4.73	2,236	25.43	116	1.32	380	4.32
Batangas	514,608	43.20	261,499	21.95	110,448	9.27	233,406	19.59	34,984	2.94	36,358	3.05
Benguet	33,413	20.56	95,927	59.03	7,326	4.51	17,275	10.63	5,675	3.49	2,893	1.78
Biliran	18,231	25.60	33,440	46.96	8,901	12.50	7,668	10.77	1,072	1.51	1,901	2.67
Bohol	276,486	45.78	80,593	13.35	171,234	28.35	54,789	9.07	10,843	1.80	9,964	1.65
Bukidnon	218,585	39.59	131,468	23.81	121,455	22.00	56,841	10.29	12,669	2.29	11,171	2.02
Bulacan	366,079	27.96	556,480	42.50	121,108	9.25	226,311	17.28	22,442	1.71	16,921	1.29
Cagayan	54,971	11.31	383,657	78.91	10,140	2.09	24,795	5.10	5,662	1.16	6,993	1.44
Cagayan de Oro	69,859	29.07	73,167	30.45	68,487	28.50	19,307	8.04	3,148	1.31	6,318	2.63
Caloocan	129,057	25.78	245,068	48.96	50,103	10.01	63,536	12.69	7,410	1.48	5,409	1.08
Camarines Norte	132,757	56.05	25,899	10.93	9,405	3.97	60,208	25.42	5,405	2.28	3,182	1.34
Camarines Sur	664,190	85.57	41,219	5.31	14,933	1.92	37,122	4.78	11,468	1.48	7,223	0.93
Camiguin	38,030	81.46	2,148	4.60	5,498	11.78	666	1.43	185	0.40	161	0.34
Capiz	253,290	73.67	43,684	12.70	12,197	3.55	19,977	5.81	11,009	3.20	3,678	1.07
Catanduanes	72,964	53.29	12,894	9.42	5,981	4.37	39,551	28.89	2,626	1.92	2,896	2.12
Cavite	404,241	30.22	556,785	41.62	142,511	10.65	193,961	14.50	17,793	1.33	22,428	1.68
Cebu	590,777	41.37	196,943	13.79	447,955	31.37	146,498	10.26	23,993	1.68	21,767	1.52
Cebu City	162,509	32.82	92,007	18.58	167,705	33.87	41,390	8.36	7,972	1.61	23,506	4.75
Compostela Valley	86,941	27.31	66,187	20.79	134,323	42.20	23,299	7.32	3,472	1.09	4,097	1.29
Cotabato	129,141	25.41	169,177	33.28	154,194	30.33	33,295	6.55	11,174	2.20	11,332	2.23
Davao City	30,718	4.90	122,620	19.54	451,296	71.93	17,645	2.81	1,879	0.30	3,236	0.52
Davao del Norte	42,684	10.23	130,796	31.34	216,058	51.77	21,429	5.13	2,433	0.58	3,925	0.94
Davao del Sur	29,288	10.44	80,303	28.63	150,910	53.81	13,551	4.83	2,887	1.03	3,518	1.25
Davao Occidental	10,129	10.21	41,194	41.51	41,644	41.96	3,561	3.59	757	0.76	1,951	1.97
Davao Oriental	45,543	19.67	45,990	19.86	113,284	48.92	18,667	8.06	3,134	1.35	4,967	2.14
Dinagat Islands	16,153	32.47	21,825	43.88	7,560	15.20	2,660	5.35	423	0.85	1,121	2.25
Eastern Samar	94,061	43.57	54,985	25.47	15,039	6.97	41,494	19.22	5,467	2.53	4,863	2.25
Guimaras	56,249	68.07	7,853	9.50	3,774	4.57	6,721	8.13	2,014	2.44	6,022	7.29
Ifugao	28,986	33.77	35,256	41.07	5,181	6.04	11,191	13.04	2,687	3.13	2,533	2.95
Iligan	27,166	23.03	29,847	25.30	46,243	39.20	11,271	9.56	1,621	1.37	1,808	1.53
Ilocos Norte	3,704	1.20	298,786	96.82	1,326	0.43	2,479	0.80	619	0.20	1,680	0.54
Ilocos Sur	14,140	4.16	316,121	93.05	2,260	0.67	4,397	1.29	1,391	0.41	1,415	0.42
Iloilo	573,729	68.52	94,411	11.28	43,352	5.18	74,480	8.90	39,419	4.71	11,870	1.42
Iloilo City	137,662	65.76	33,778	16.14	14,229	6.80	15,766	7.53	6,052	2.89	1,852	0.88
Isabela	88,317	12.77	516,926	74.72	17,924	2.59	46,338	6.70	7,780	1.12	14,489	2.09
Kalinga	11,636	12.58	64,023	69.21	2,574	2.78	9,589	10.37	2,587	2.80	2,103	2.27
La Union	19,596	5.20	338,455	89.76	4,204	1.11	9,694	2.57	2,791	0.74	2,309	0.61
Laguna	390,541	31.42	441,154	35.49	122,752	9.87	242,788	19.53	22,825	1.84	23,075	1.86
Lanao del Norte	68,974	30.77	67,817	30.25	45,367	20.24	21,101	9.41	5,219	2.33	15,705	7.01
Lanao del Sur	180,539	54.21	56,243	16.89	53,745	16.14	17,796	5.34	13,607	4.09	11,082	3.33
Lapu-Lapu	63,766	43.37	21,104	14.35	46,469	31.60	11,840	8.05	2,167	1.47	1,695	1.15
Las Piñas	63,456	28.92	97,641	44.49	30,720	14.00	22,899	10.43	2,455	1.12	2,286	1.04
Leyte	241,960	29.40	406,815	49.44	88,267	10.73	67,339	8.18	7,650	0.93	10,842	1.32
Maguindanao	220,125	51.08	80,591	18.70	35,233	8.18	50,536	11.73	12,922	3.00	31,532	7.32
Makati	91,484	29.71	149,645	48.59	24,606	7.99	20,325	6.60	2,304	0.75	19,590	6.36
Malabon	38,045	25.64	67,992	45.82	16,489	11.11	22,566	15.21	1,799	1.21	1,502	1.01
Mandaluyong	45,462	29.94	73,495	48.41	16,235	10.69	13,598	8.96	1,344	0.89	1,694	1.12
Manila	183,346	24.67	394,192	53.03	75,295	10.13	74,112	9.97	8,989	1.21	7,398	1.00
Marikina	66,558	37.56	69,530	39.23	18,394	10.38	18,794	10.60	2,325	1.31	1,625	0.92
Marinduque	40,598	38.15	22,022	20.69	8,035	7.55	27,720	26.05	5,413	5.09	2,632	2.47
Masbate	169,297	56.50	47,220	15.76	21,305	7.11	45,505	15.19	7,224	2.41	9,112	3.04
Misamis Occidental	143,402	55.97	36,912	14.41	52,107	20.34	17,408	6.79	3,548	1.38	2,838	1.11
Misamis Oriental	147,884	35.76	102,911	24.89	104,603	25.29	40,554	9.81	8,045	1.95	9,546	2.31
Mountain Province	17,653	24.89	34,286	48.34	3,295	4.65	10,038	14.15	3,619	5.10	2,030	2.86
Muntinlupa	68,843	31.64	86,252	39.64	29,225	13.43	26,813	12.32	2,586	1.19	3,879	1.78
Navotas	18,193	18.41	47,943	48.51	10,051	10.17	14,860	15.04	1,294	1.31	6,482	6.56
Negros Occidental	614,440	61.06	119,149	11.84	72,832	7.24	136,634	13.58	51,143	5.08	12,145	1.21
Negros Oriental	255,598	50.01	66,506	13.01	100,839	19.73	52,920	10.36	21,221	4.15	13,972	2.73
Northern Samar	111,461	42.71	73,214	28.05	14,779	5.66	45,842	17.56	6,184	2.37	9,516	3.65
Nueva Ecija	216,204	22.20	541,980	55.65	45,492	4.67	128,162	13.16	21,823	2.24	20,186	2.07
Nueva Vizcaya	29,437	15.57	126,248	66.77	6,263	3.31	17,407	9.21	4,740	2.51	4,992	2.64
Occidental Mindoro	79,411	43.80	57,115	31.50	9,236	5.09	21,975	12.12	5,576	3.08	8,000	4.41
Oriental Mindoro	141,410	42.63	71,808	21.65	21,586	6.51	73,393	22.12	12,677	3.82	10,874	3.28
Palawan	183,884	44.62	93,647	22.72	38,431	9.32	67,835	16.46	18,418	4.47	9,914	2.41
Pampanga	293,420	29.42	434,235	43.54	102,539	10.28	141,106	14.15	13,336	1.34	12,721	1.28
Pangasinan	265,016	19.48	832,711	61.22	57,051	4.19	156,118	11.48	32,260	2.37	17,056	1.25
Parañaque	80,710	35.89	85,786	38.15	30,289	13.47	23,185	10.31	2,426	1.08	2,456	1.09
Pasay	51,790	26.85	97,776	50.70	20,417	10.59	18,287	9.48	1,804	0.94	2,797	1.45
Pasig	103,040	32.67	129,145	40.94	36,604	11.60	39,895	12.65	3,661	1.16	3,093	0.98
Quezon	385,164	44.66	173,394	20.11	54,702	6.34	191,444	22.20	29,752	3.45	27,946	3.24
Quezon City	297,899	33.33	412,681	46.17	86,604	9.69	80,180	8.97	8,738	0.98	7,669	0.86
Quirino	14,906	19.48	49,158	64.23	2,554	3.34	6,525	8.53	1,931	2.52	1,460	1.91
Rizal	285,417	28.40	435,471	43.34	97,453	9.70	154,365	15.36	15,396	1.53	16,775	1.67
Romblon	61,915	49.41	24,645	19.67	8,046	6.42	22,712	18.12	4,418	3.53	3,576	2.85
Samar	132,775	37.50	128,401	36.26	17,043	4.81	62,472	17.64	5,446	1.54	7,940	2.24
San Juan	18,696	32.84	26,543	46.63	6,459	11.35	4,262	7.49	458	0.80	509	0.89
Sarangani	47,803	24.78	66,484	34.47	47,826	24.79	15,660	8.12	7,131	3.70	7,990	4.14
Siquijor	30,468	59.82	5,746	11.28	7,281	14.30	4,141	8.13	1,230	2.41	2,066	4.06
Sorsogon	97,129	28.82	20,709	6.14	6,909	2.05	203,689	60.43	3,514	1.04	5,115	1.52
South Cotabato	177,396	31.68	191,461	34.19	126,303	22.56	37,865	6.76	18,001	3.21	8,919	1.59
Southern Leyte	94,972	49.78	32,792	17.19	40,689	21.33	16,120	8.45	2,476	1.30	3,739	1.96
Sultan Kudarat	84,225	31.00	104,592	38.49	46,197	17.00	19,489	7.17	8,980	3.30	8,250	3.04
Sulu	46,218	19.63	127,437	54.13	39,254	16.67	13,744	5.84	1,663	0.71	7,110	3.02
Surigao del Norte	89,688	37.28	37,946	15.77	73,403	30.51	31,273	13.00	3,913	1.63	4,357	1.81
Surigao del Sur	88,503	33.13	48,326	18.09	88,519	33.14	30,619	11.46	4,984	1.87	6,161	2.31
Taguig–Pateros	41,782	14.76	86,270	30.48	134,608	47.56	16,615	5.87	1,751	0.62	2,030	0.72
Tarlac	243,756	41.07	214,166	36.08	31,821	5.36	75,224	12.67	20,715	3.49	7,884	1.33
Tawi-Tawi	42,252	36.99	35,165	30.79	20,567	18.01	8,937	7.82	2,383	2.09	4,914	4.30
Valenzuela	67,097	25.74	116,455	44.68	26,972	10.35	44,731	17.16	3,258	1.25	2,135	0.82
Zambales	103,972	29.26	163,760	46.08	20,163	5.67	49,941	14.05	10,456	2.94	7,066	1.99
Zamboanga City	73,730	28.37	67,522	25.98	50,552	19.45	45,352	17.45	15,406	5.93	7,365	2.83
Zamboanga del Norte	209,491	51.08	72,255	17.62	63,847	15.57	41,866	10.21	8,135	1.98	14,500	3.54
Zamboanga del Sur	100,188	28.41	145,455	41.25	57,863	16.41	34,391	9.75	8,110	2.30	6,609	1.87
Zamboanga Sibugay	101,141	43.94	42,336	18.39	51,528	22.38	19,810	8.61	8,952	3.89	6,425	2.79
Local absentee voters	2,341	12.32	11,683	61.48	2,134	11.23	944	4.97	1,588	8.36	314	1.65
Detainee voters	393	18.21	607	28.13	170	7.88	689	31.93	139	6.44	160	7.41
Argentina	16	22.86	18	25.71	25	35.71	8	11.43	2	2.86	1	1.43
Australia	1,280	39.20	657	20.12	1,077	32.99	189	5.79	44	1.35	18	0.55
Austria	259	29.27	272	30.73	286	32.32	50	5.65	6	0.68	12	1.36
Bahrain	1,388	19.34	3,228	44.97	2,085	29.05	352	4.90	65	0.91	60	0.84
Bangladesh	72	26.37	134	49.08	57	20.88	7	2.56	1	0.37	2	0.73
Belgium	321	27.55	356	30.56	381	32.70	80	6.87	18	1.55	9	0.77
Brazil	30	10.49	91	31.82	82	28.67	76	26.57	5	1.75	2	0.70
Brunei	682	16.62	1,904	46.39	1,254	30.56	185	4.51	41	1.00	38	0.93
Cambodia	203	19.92	420	41.22	330	32.38	55	5.40	6	0.59	5	0.49
Canada	5,391	23.99	8,622	38.37	6,993	31.12	1,168	5.20	183	0.81	116	0.52
Chile	28	10.26	147	53.85	90	32.97	5	1.83	2	0.73	1	0.37
China	6,911	13.58	28,080	55.16	13,802	27.11	1,578	3.10	330	0.65	205	0.40
Czech Republic	53	21.46	90	36.44	91	36.84	9	3.64	2	0.81	2	0.81
Egypt	182	19.24	391	41.33	284	30.02	45	4.76	13	1.37	31	3.28
France	467	25.89	661	36.64	540	29.93	123	6.82	9	0.50	4	0.22
Germany	458	23.36	540	27.54	756	38.55	134	6.83	34	1.73	39	1.99
Greece	388	15.63	1,346	54.21	501	20.18	176	7.09	29	1.17	43	1.73
Guam	1,429	43.49	809	24.62	564	17.16	394	11.99	50	1.52	40	1.22
Hungary	39	14.77	116	43.94	84	31.82	16	6.06	3	1.14	6	2.27
India	22	34.92	19	30.16	19	30.16	1	1.59	1	1.59	1	1.59
Indonesia	630	41.26	398	26.06	441	28.88	40	2.62	9	0.59	9	0.59
Iran	22	23.16	47	49.47	21	22.11	3	3.16	2	2.11	0	0.00
Israel	580	10.15	3,350	58.63	1,519	26.58	194	3.40	38	0.67	33	0.58
Italy	2,873	20.76	6,374	46.05	3,489	25.21	778	5.62	131	0.95	195	1.41
Japan	2,246	15.41	5,212	35.77	6,148	42.19	669	4.59	104	0.71	193	1.32
Jordan	289	14.26	903	44.57	589	29.07	162	8.00	27	1.33	56	2.76
Kenya	64	15.02	176	41.31	140	32.86	29	6.81	6	1.41	11	2.58
Kuwait	1,999	16.46	4,777	39.34	4,666	38.43	545	4.49	85	0.70	70	0.58
Laos	96	15.74	285	46.72	195	31.97	22	3.61	9	1.48	3	0.49
Lebanon	353	8.55	2,408	58.32	1,064	25.77	229	5.55	23	0.56	52	1.26
Malaysia	534	17.47	1,322	43.26	1,055	34.52	102	3.34	27	0.88	16	0.52
Mexico	56	21.71	118	45.74	70	27.13	8	3.10	5	1.94	1	0.39
Myanmar	89	39.56	63	28.00	60	26.67	10	4.44	0	0.00	3	1.33
Netherlands	220	27.16	213	26.30	335	41.36	30	3.70	6	0.74	6	0.74
New Zealand	581	19.86	768	26.25	1,401	47.88	128	4.37	26	0.89	22	0.75
Nigeria	77	22.71	131	38.64	99	29.20	22	6.49	4	1.18	6	1.77
Norway	271	16.05	515	30.51	793	46.98	86	5.09	16	0.95	7	0.41
Oman	699	19.40	1,477	40.99	1,214	33.69	170	4.72	18	0.50	25	0.69
Pakistan	28	11.52	116	47.74	79	32.51	14	5.76	2	0.82	4	1.65
Papua New Guinea	362	37.99	298	31.27	212	22.25	65	6.82	10	1.05	6	0.63
Poland	47	26.86	57	32.57	62	35.43	5	2.86	2	1.14	2	1.14
Portugal	64	14.16	237	52.43	111	24.56	34	7.52	4	0.88	2	0.44
Qatar	3,268	20.99	6,119	39.29	5,442	34.95	545	3.50	103	0.66	95	0.61
Russia	93	9.26	566	56.37	301	29.98	38	3.78	5	0.50	1	0.10
Saudi Arabia	10,934	23.56	19,645	42.34	13,089	28.21	1,973	4.25	412	0.89	347	0.75
Singapore	8,187	20.79	14,915	37.88	14,960	37.99	911	2.31	242	0.61	160	0.41
South Africa	82	26.62	131	42.53	78	25.32	12	3.90	3	0.97	2	0.65
South Korea	363	10.52	1,721	49.90	1,266	36.71	82	2.38	12	0.35	5	0.14
Spain	857	14.51	3,124	52.88	1,594	26.98	240	4.06	36	0.61	57	0.96
Switzerland	939	32.40	909	31.37	839	28.95	167	5.76	22	0.76	22	0.76
Taiwan	950	7.29	7,594	58.29	3,858	29.61	496	3.81	66	0.51	65	0.50
Thailand	615	17.72	1,284	36.99	1,464	42.18	72	2.07	17	0.49	19	0.55
Timor-Leste	72	17.10	177	42.04	140	33.25	25	5.94	3	0.71	4	0.95
Turkey	114	17.30	299	45.37	210	31.87	25	3.79	5	0.76	6	0.91
United Arab Emirates	10,347	16.77	25,319	41.04	23,583	38.23	1,880	3.05	302	0.49	255	0.41
United Kingdom	2,616	26.59	3,358	34.13	3,328	33.83	378	3.84	82	0.83	76	0.77
United States	18,407	37.78	14,193	29.13	11,980	24.59	3,181	6.53	525	1.08	432	0.89
Vatican City	135	52.94	37	14.51	53	20.78	19	7.45	9	3.53	2	0.78
Vietnam	127	29.47	132	30.63	146	33.87	16	3.71	4	0.93	6	1.39
Total	14,418,817	35.11	14,155,344	34.47	5,903,379	14.38	4,931,962	12.01	868,501	2.11	788,881	1.92
