= Capitol University =

Private university in Cagayan de Oro, Philippines

- Pamantasang Kapitolyo (Filipino)
- Former name: Cagayan Capitol College (1971–2003)
- Motto: Progressio Integralis, Pro Deo et Hominibus
- Motto in English: "Total Person Development, For God and Humanity"
- Type: Private, non-sectarian university
- Established: 1972; 54 years ago
- Founder: Laureana San Pedro Rosales
- President: Casimiro B. Juarez, Jr.
- Students: 6,000 (SY 2018/2019)
- Location: Cagayan de Oro, Misamis Oriental, Philippines; 8°29′18″N 124°39′10″E
- Campus: Corrales Avenue Extension-Osmeña Extension (Main campus)
- Colors: Red and white
- Website: www.cu.edu.ph
- Location in Mindanao Location in the Philippines

Capitol University is a non-sectarian, co-educational private university located in Cagayan de Oro, Philippines. It is registered with the Securities and Exchange Commission as a stock corporation and operates with the authority of the Department of Education for its primary and secondary programs and the Commission on Higher Education for its tertiary, graduate and postgraduate programs.

== History ==
=== 1971–1979 ===
Upon its opening in 1971, the university offered secondary course and tertiary courses in Liberal Arts, Commerce, Education and Secretarial. In 1973, the first Midwifery program in Region 10 began with the inauguration of a Cagayan Capitol College Maternity Hospital and then later to Capitol University Medical Center which eventually transferred to Gusa, Cagayan de Oro on 1984. The following year, 1974, the Nautical and Marine Engineering Programs were opened along with Civil Engineering and Forestry. In 1976, Mechanical Engineering, Nursing and Agriculture programs were opened. The same year, the school acquired the M/V Capitol College, a 650-ton freighter which served as the training ship for the Maritime cadets.

=== 1980–1989 ===
In 1981, the graduate school was opened with a Masters in Filipino as the initial program offering. Presently, the Capitol University Graduate School offers two doctoral programs and five Master's Programs. In 1987, the preschool and elementary teachers' training departments were transferred to a campus in Gusa, Cagayan de Oro and named the St. Francis Learning Center, after St. Francis of Assisi.

=== 1990–present ===
During the 1990s, Cagayan Capitol College opened more tertiary programs like Physical Therapy, Criminology and Computer Science, Cisco Networking Program, the Expanded Tertiary Education Equivalency and Accreditation Program (ETEEAP) and Associate programs. The in-house review for the Nursing Licensure, Commission on Graduates of Foreign Nursing Schools (CGFNS), NCLEX and Criminology Board exams were opened.

To promote a culture of research and service to the community, Capitol University formed the Capitol University Research and Extension Office (CURExO).

On February 3, 2003, 32 years after its founding, Cagayan Capitol College received its charter as a university. On May 2, 2003, it was formally inaugurated as Capitol University with Atty. Casimiro B. Juarez, Jr. installed as the first university president.

== Schools and colleges ==
Capitol University building

=== Undergraduate ===
==== College of Computer Studies ====
The College of Computer Studies is the newest on the campus. The College of Computer studies is a CHED Center of Development, making it one of the most computing-intensive colleges in the city. With a computer-to-student ratio of 1 to 1, students have access to more than 200 on-campus computers ranging from current model PCs to high-end graphics workstations.

Courses offered:

- Bachelor of Science in Information Technology
- Associate in Computer Technology

==== College of Education ====
The College of Education offers a program for Elementary Education and Secondary Education. Both programs consist of three years of academic instruction and one year of practical teaching in Capitol University Basic Education Department or CU-BED (formerly St. Francis Learning Center).

Courses offered:

- Bachelor of Elementary Education
- Bachelor of Secondary Education, majors in English, Math, Physical Education, Social Studies

==== College of Engineering ====
The College of Engineering is recognized by CHED as a "Center of Development" and its BSCE and BSME programs are Level III accredited with the Philippine Association of Colleges and Universities - Commission in Accreditation (PACU-COA).

Courses offered:

- Bachelor of Science in Civil Engineering
- Bachelor of Science in Electronics Engineering
- Bachelor of Science in Mechanical Engineering

==== College of Maritime Education ====
The College of Maritime Education (CU-CME) is composed of the Nautical Studies Department and the Marine Engineering Department. The college is under a Superintendent and Dean of each department. It has a Shipboard Training Office which facilitates the shipboard affairs of its graduates.

The school complies with the IMO-STCW as well with CHED requirements. CU-MEP is accredited by the Det Norske Veritas (DNV) and is one of the first schools in the Philippines that obtained ISO 9000 certification. CU-MEP is accredited with the Philippine Association of Colleges and University Commission in Accreditation (PACUCOA).

Courses offered:

- Bachelor of Science in Marine Transportation
- Bachelor of Science in Marine Engineering

==== College of Health Sciences ====
Courses offered:

- Bachelor of Science in Nursing

Bachelor of Science in Medical Technology (New)

The CU College of Nursing provides its classroom instruction by faculty and a Nursing Skills Laboratory to develop competencies in performing nursing procedures. The Capitol University Medical Center, a 300-bed tertiary hospital, serves as the base training hospital for the College of Nursing and Midwifery students.

==== College of Arts and Sciences ====
The College of Arts and Sciences in Capitol University is Level IV Accredited by the Philippine Association of Colleges and University Commission in Accreditation (PACUCOA).

Program Offered:

- Bachelor of Arts in English Language Studies

==== School of Midwifery ====
Courses offered:

- Graduate in Midwifery

=== Graduate school ===
- Doctor of Philosophy in Educational Management
- Doctor of Management
- Master of Arts in Educational Administration
- Master of Arts in Filipino
- Master of Arts in Guidance and Counseling
- Master of Business Management
- Master of Education in English
- Master of Public Service Management

== See also ==
- Capitol University Medical Center
