= Harapan ng Bise =

Philippines television series

- Created by: ABS-CBN
- Presented by: Alvin Elchico; Lynda Jumilla; Gretchen Ho (Social Media Correspondent)
- Opening theme: Ipanalo ang Pamilyang Pilipino (ABS-CBN Election Station ID theme)
- Ending theme: Ipanalo ang Pamilyang Pilipino (ABS-CBN Election Station ID theme)
- Country of origin: Philippines
- No. of episodes: 1

Production
- Producer: ABS-CBN
- Production locations: ABS-CBN Compound, Quezon City
- Running time: 90 minutes

Original release
- Network: ABS-CBN
- Release: April 17, 2016

Harapan ng Bise (lit. 'Faceoff of the Vice [Presidents]') also known as Harapan ng Bise: The ABS-CBN Vice Presidential Debate was a televised debate organized and broadcast by ABS-CBN on April 17, 2016. The debate is not part of the Commission on Elections-organized PiliPinas Debates 2016. The debate was moderated by ABS-CBN News journalists Alvin Elchico and Lynda Jumilla, with Gretchen Ho as the social media correspondent. Veteran news anchor Tina Monzon-Palma and political analysts Edna Co and Julio Teehankee served as the debate panelists.

The debate was simultaneously aired on ABS-CBN, ABS-CBN News Channel, DZMM TeleRadyo and DZMM 630, The Filipino Channel and news.abs-cbn.com, with a replay on the following day on PTV-4 and TV5.

Broadcast of the program took 133 minutes with 43 minutes allotted to advertisements.

== Participants ==
Bongbong Marcos and Gringo Honasan did not take part in the televised debate. Marcos issued a statement that he made private meetings and joined a Unity Caravan in Batangas during the day of the debate. He also stated that he and his wife, Louise Araneta Marcos, spent their 23rd wedding anniversary and had dinner. Coincidentally, the anti-Marcos protestors were seen gathering around outside the compound, remembering the atrocities made during the Martial Law under the rule of former President Ferdinand Marcos.

Honasan cited prior commitments in Mindanao which can't be cancelled in short notice to enable him to attend the debate.

Participants at the Harapan ng Bise
P Participated A Absent
Alan Cayetano	Chiz Escudero	Gregorio Honasan	Bongbong Marcos	Leni Robredo	Antonio Trillanes
P	P	A	A	P	P
