= 2016 in Philippine television =

The following is a list of events affecting Philippine television in 2016. Events listed include television show debuts, finales, cancellations, and channel launches, closures and rebrandings, as well as information about controversies and carriage disputes.

== Events ==
=== January ===
- January 1
  - Charo Santos-Concio retired as president and CEO of the ABS-CBN Corporation and is succeeded by its COO, Carlo L. Katigbak, although she retains her role as chief content officer, president of ABS-CBN University, and executive adviser to the chairman Gabby Lopez.
  - S+A launched in high-definition as S+A HD on Sky Cable, Destiny Cable and Sky Direct. It became the second high-definition cable channel of ABS-CBN Corporation after ABS-CBN HD on October 3, 2015 and also served as the replacement of Balls HD that closed on December 31, 2015.
  - GMA Network Inc. formally unveiled the newest version of Lupang Hinirang (Philippine national anthem) aired during sign-on and sign-off of GMA and GMA News TV and the first screening and last full show of films in selected SM cinemas.
- January 2 – Tawag ng Tanghalan officially returned as a segment of ABS-CBN's noontime variety show, It's Showtime which also used as first and second iterations from 1953 to 1972 and from 1987 to 1989.
- January 7 – Netflix was launched in the Philippines along with 130 countries, as part of the streaming service's global expansion.
- January 8 – Janine Tugonon wins the 1 million pesos of Kapamilya, Deal or No Deal.
- January 25 – President Benigno Aquino III approved the privatization plans of the government-sequestered television network Intercontinental Broadcasting Corporation (IBC-13) thru public bidding.

=== February ===
- February 1
  - ABS-CBN's primetime series On the Wings of Love apologizes to the Philippine National Police (PNP) on a complaint of using a police uniform on James Reid's character in a striptease scene with Nadine Lustre's character in the January 11 episode of the drama series.
  - GMA Network's Wowowin returned to the airwaves now as a daily afternoon program.
- February 4 – FITE TV, a streaming service owned by Flipps Media Inc., was launched and became available in the Philippines.
- February 7 – Lucky Aces was named the first-ever Dance Kids grand champion held at the Newport Performing Arts Theater at Resorts World Manila.
- February 12 – ABS-CBN's noontime variety show, It's Showtime launched its all-female dance group known as the GirlTrends consisting of 21 talents from Star Magic, Pinoy Big Brother and other programs.
- February 13 – After 19 years and a month of its broadcast programming run, Walang Tulugan with the Master Showman aired its final episode as the original host, German Moreno died on January 8, making the longest-running variety show on Philippine television.
- February 21 – The first leg of the PiliPinas Debates 2016, a COMELEC-organized presidential debate held at the Capitol University, Cagayan de Oro and aired on GMA Network.
- February 26 – TV5 and Radio Mindanao Network joined forces for comprehensive election coverage for the 2016 Presidential Elections signed by TV5 President & CEO Emmanuel Lorenzana and RMN Chairman & President Eric Canoy of the Memorandum of Agreement (MOA) together of TV5's for Bilang Pilipino 2016 Election Coverage of RMN for the widen reach audiences in Visayas and Mindanao TV5 and RMN Networks join forces alliance for the 2016 Presidential Debate on March 20 in Cebu City after ABC 5–Radio Mindanao Network (RMN) Election Coverage The Vote '98, Bilang Bayan 2004 and Bilang Bayan 2007 in 1998, 2004 and 2007.

=== March ===
- March 1 – WWE Network, a streaming service owned by WWE, became available in the Philippines.
- March 15 – ABS-CBN News Channel launched in high-definition as ANC HD on Sky Cable and Destiny Cable. It is the third high-definition cable channel of ABS-CBN Corporation after ABS-CBN HD and S+A HD.
- March 16 – ABS-CBN Corporation forged a partnership with Viva Films and Regal Entertainment for the broadcast rights of their respective films in ABS-CBN's free-to-air networks, cable channels, video on demand, and global assets. At the same time, ABS-CBN also signed a deal with Artikulo Uno Productions for the broadcast rights of Heneral Luna.
- March 18 – Sky Direct was launched as the third direct-to-home satellite provider in the Philippines.
- March 20 – The second leg of the PiliPinas Debates 2016, a COMELEC-organized presidential debate held at the Performing Arts Hall of the University of the Philippines, Cebu City and aired on TV5.

=== April ===
- April 10 – The Metro Manila leg of the PiliPinas Debates 2016, a COMELEC-organized first vice presidential debate held at the University of Santo Tomas, Manila and aired on CNN Philippines.
- April 17
  - Maxine Medina, a graduate of the Philippine School of Interior Design with experience in designing residential condominiums and a model, is crowned as Miss Universe Philippines 2016 during the coronation night of the Binibining Pilipinas 2016 at the Smart Araneta Coliseum in Quezon City.
  - The Harapan ng Bise: The ABS-CBN Vice Presidential Debate, a televised debate created and organized by ABS-CBN held at the ABS-CBN Compound.
- April 23 – Yohan Hwang, a Korean tourist based in Manila, won the first Grand Touristar title of the reality competition show I Love OPM at the Newport Performing Arts Theater of Resorts World Manila in Pasay.
- April 24
  - The third leg of the PiliPinas Debates 2016, a COMELEC-organized presidential debate held at the University of Pangasinan, Dagupan and aired on ABS-CBN.
  - "Dalawang Letra", a song entry composed by Pinoy Dream Academy alumnus Davey Langit and interpreted by Itchyworms band was named as Himig Handog P-Pop Love Songs grand winner held at Kia Theater. This was aired on ABS-CBN's Sunday's Best.
- April 30 – The DLSU Lady Spikers wins the UAAP Season 78 women's volleyball championship title after defeating the Ateneo Lady Eagles 2–1 in a best-of-three series. This was their 9th championship title since they won their last title in 2013.

=== May ===
- May 1 – The ABS-CBN News Channel celebrated its 20th anniversary.
- May 9–10 – All Philippine TV networks (including ABS-CBN, GMA & TV5) had its special coverage of the 2016 elections.
- May 22 – Power Duo, composed of couple Anjanette and Gervin from Angono, Rizal, wins the fifth season of Pilipinas Got Talent, the grand finals of which were held at the Mall of Asia Arena in Pasay.
- May 27 – The Walt Disney Company, through its partner Globe Telecom, launched three separated video entertainment streaming service apps dedicated to Disney Channel, Disney Junior and Disney XD, replacing the three "Watch" apps of the same channels.
- May 29 – Shanne Dandan was hailed as Born to Be a Star Season 1 grand winner.

=== June ===
- June 13 – ABS-CBN Corporation celebrated its 70th anniversary of original establishment in 1946.
- June 20 - Dan-ag sa Dakbayan Broadcasting Corporation of Ozamiz City launched DXDD Radio-Television on Fil Products Ozamiz. Later, the channel launched on Misamis Cable TV.
- June 30 – Jessy Mendiola, a television actress, is hailed as The Nation's Sexiest Woman in FHM Philippines' 2016 100 Sexiest List.
- June 30 – James Reid, a television actor, leads as Sexiest Man in the Philippines in Sexiest Male in the Philippines' 2014 & 2016 100 Sexiest List.

=== July ===
- July 11 – Alden Richards and Maine Mendoza were declared as The Most Beautiful Stars of 2016 of YES! magazine.
- July 17 – The all-male group Tres Kantos, of Bugoy Drilon, Jovit Baldivino, and former Tawag ng Tanghalan contestant Dominador Aviola, mentored by Erik Santos, were named the first winner as Grand Celebriteam of We Love OPM during the show's live finale at the Newport Performing Arts Theater, Resorts World Manila.

=== August ===
- August 21 – Alden Richards and Maine Mendoza, collectively known as AlDub, and Kathryn Bernardo and Daniel Padilla, collectively known as KathNiel, and other Kapamilya and Kapuso personalities and programs were among the winners at the 2016 PEP List Awards night held at the Crown Plaza Hotel.
- August 28 – Joshua Oliveros, coached by Lea Salonga, won the third season of The Voice Kids, the grand finals of which were held at the Newport Performing Arts Theater, Resorts World Manila.

=== September ===
- September 2 – Abigail Abion was hailed as KemboTitas grand winner on It's Showtime.
- September 3 – Sonshine Media Network International is added to Cignal TV Channel 186 on their channel lineup.
- September 14 – ABS-CBN Corporation celebrated its 30th anniversary of re-establishment following the People Power Revolution.
- September 26 – Jodi Sta. Maria and Bridges of Love were nominated for an International Emmy Award for Best Actress for her work in Pangako Sa 'Yo and an International Emmy Award for best telenovela respectively at the 2016 International Emmy Awards.

=== October ===
- October 4 – During the 30th anniversary celebration held recently at the Marriott Grand Ballroom in Pasay, DZMM announced the launch of the noontime national newscast Headline Pilipinas, airing exclusively on DZMM TeleRadyo anchored by Tony Velasquez, together with ABS-CBN Cebu's Leo Lastimosa and ABS-CBN Davao's Melanie Severino.
- October 15 – Names Going Wild from Halo Halloween 2015 was hailed as Clash of Champions grand winner on It's Showtime.
- October 22
  - Team Anne, Amy and Joey hailed as the seventh anniversary (Magpasikat 2016, haPITOgether) champion on It's Showtime.
  - Turbo Zone celebrated its 5th anniversary in Philippine television.
- October 29 – Joj & Jai Agpangan was hailed as COC - Clash of Celebrities Round 2 grand winner on It's Showtime.

=== November ===
- November 7 – ABS-CBN launches the Christmas song Isang Pamilya Tayo Ngayong Pasko, after the news program TV Patrol.
- November 15 – Following the success of the Fight of the Century between Manny Pacquiao and Floyd Mayweather Jr. in May 2015, Solar Entertainment announced its broadcast of the 65th Miss Universe pageant on January 30, 2017. As stated in a press conference that day, it was broadcast live on three major television stations in the Philippines, ABS-CBN (who waived its contract with Solar to allow its free-to-air coverage of the pageant), GMA Network, and TV5 (who also broadcast the preliminary events and will handle the digital rights exclusively), with ETC, 2nd Avenue, Jack TV and CT as its main content provider for this historic pageant. Star World Philippines, the Philippine cable broadcast holder of the pageant (which sub-licensed the cable rights to the pageant with the over-the-air rights holder ABS-CBN), passed on the rights on that year's pageant to Solar, the 66th edition of the pageant eventually returned to the channel in November 2017, 1 month after its rebranding to Fox Life in October.
- November 19 – John Carlo Cruz emerged as the Ultimate Tough Model on It's Showtime.
- November 21 – The World Tonight celebrated its 50th anniversary of the longest-running English news program in the Philippines since its premiered in 1966.
- November 29 – Viu, a streaming service owned by PCCW Media Group, was launched and became available in the Philippines.

=== December ===
- December 7 – The De La Salle Green Archers clinched the UAAP Season 79 men's basketball title after defeating the archrivals Ateneo Blue Eagles 2–0 in game 2 of the best-of-three finals series held at the Smart Araneta Coliseum in Quezon City. This was their 9th basketball championship title since they last won in 2013.
- December 10 – Lil Jay was hailed as the first Christmas Rapper Grand Winner on It's Showtime.
- December 11 – Niel Murillo, Russell Reyes, Ford Valencia, Tristan Ramirez and Joao Constancia were named as the winners of Pinoy Boyband Superstar, and they will officially be called BoybandPH.
- December 14 – Amazon Prime Video, a streaming and video on-demand service owned by Amazon, was expanded to over 200 countries and territories, including the Philippines.
- December 15 – The team of Parul Shah and Maggie Wilson, representing the Philippines, were held as winners at The Amazing Race Asia 5. The team of Eric and Rona Tai, also representing the Philippines, came in third place.
- December 28 – Executive Secretary Salvador Medialdea issued Memorandum Circular No. 13, enjoining all departments, agencies, bureaus and offices of the government to support the hosting of the Miss Universe 2016 pageant in the Philippines.
- December 31 – MTV Pinoy was officially shut down after 2 years of broadcasting.

== Debuts ==
=== ABS-CBN ===
The following are programs that debuted on ABS-CBN:

- January 18: Be My Lady
- January 23: Pilipinas Got Talent season 5
- February 1: Tubig at Langis
- February 13: I Love OPM
- February 15: Dolce Amore
- February 29: The Story of Us and We Will Survive
- March 7: Game ng Bayan
- March 14: My Love Donna
- March 27: Kung Fu Panda: Legends of Awesomeness season 3
- March 28: Jane the Virgin (seasons 1 and 2) and Naruto: Shippuden season 1
- April 9: Family Feud (3rd incarnation)
- April 18: Magandang Buhay and My Super D
- May 14: We Love OPM: The Celebrity Sing-Offs
- May 22: Pluma
- May 28: The Voice Kids season 3
- June 20: Born for You
- July 11: Pinoy Big Brother: Lucky 7
- July 18: Minute to Win It: Last Man Standing (season 1) and PBB Vietnam: Mga Kwento ng Celebrity Housemates (later retitled into PBB Lucky Season 7: Mga Kwento ng Celebrity Housemates, PBB Lucky Season 7: Mga Kwento ng Teen Housemates, and PBB Lucky Season 7: Mga Kwento ng Housemates ni Kuya in 2016, finally retitled into PBB Lucky Season 7: Mga Kwento ng Dream Team ni Kuya in 2017)
- August 29: Till I Met You
- September 5: The Greatest Love
- September 10: Pinoy Boyband Superstar
- September 19: Magpahanggang Wakas
- October 23: Oyayi
- November 28: Langit Lupa

==== Re-runs ====
- November 13: Avatar: The Legend of Aang season 3

=== GMA ===
The following are programs that debuted on GMA Network:

- January 9: Hayate the Combat Butler: Can't Take My Eyes Off You
- January 11: Pokémon the Series: Black & White (season 14) and Temptation
- January 12: Stan Lee's Superhumans
- January 13: Serial Killer Earth
- January 14: Big History
- January 18: Wish I May
- January 24: Wanted: President
- January 25: That's My Amboy
- February 1: Balitang Amianan (GMA Dagupan), Balitang Bisdak (GMA Cebu), Carmina and Wowowin (Weekday Edition)
- February 8: You're the Best
- February 14: Dear Uge
- February 19: Dream Home
- February 20: Hayate the Combat Butler: Cuties and Midnight Horror Stories
- February 27: Lip Sync Battle Philippines (season 1)
- March 5: Bakugan: Gundalian Invaders
- March 7: Hanggang Makita Kang Muli
- March 14: Heart of Asia Presents and The Millionaire's Wife
- March 28: GMA News Update, Hi! School: Love On, Poor Señorita and Yo-kai Watch (season 1)
- April 25: Bleach season 6, Mako Mermaids and Naku, Boss Ko!
- May 2: Once Again and Yan ang Morning!
- May 7: Alien Monkeys
- May 10: Love Me, Heal Me
- May 15: Alamat (season 2)
- May 16: Juan Happy Love Story
- May 23: Magkaibang Mundo
- May 28: Laff Camera Action
- June 1: I Heart You Doc and Secret Hotel
- June 2: A1 Ko Sa 'Yo
- June 4: Lip Sync Battle Philippines (season 2)
- June 13: Calle Siete, Home Foodie (season 2) and Pokémon: Black & White: Rival Destinies (season 15)
- June 18: Pac-Man and the Ghostly Adventures (season 2)
- June 19: Hay, Bahay!
- June 26: Conan, My Beautician
- June 27: Mamaw-in-Law and Sa Piling ni Nanay
- July 4: Oh My Venus
- July 18: Encantadia (2016) and Sinungaling Mong Puso
- July 25: Descendants of the Sun and The Healer
- August 22: Pokémon: Black & White: Adventures in Unova (season 16)
- August 29: Angel's Revenge
- September 3: #LIKE and Superstar Duets
- September 5: Someone to Watch Over Me
- September 19: Alyas Robin Hood season 1 and Oh, My Mama!
- September 25: URL: Usapang Real Love
- October 1: Wonderballs
- October 3: 24 Oras Davao (GMA Davao) and Oh My Ghost
- October 15: Kalyeserye (Book 2)
- October 24: Trops
- October 31: Hahamakin ang Lahat
- November 12: My Little Pony: Friendship Is Magic
- November 13: Tsuperhero
- November 14: Heart of Asia Presents (season 2)
- December 5: Codename: Yong Pal and Ika-6 na Utos
- December 18: Biyaheng DO30 (GMA Davao)

==== Re-runs ====
- February 20: Magic Knight Rayearth^{1}
- August 15: H_{2}O: Just Add Water^{2}
- October 24: Pokémon the Series: XY (season 17)
- December 1: Mako Mermaids

Notes
^ ^{1} Originally aired on ABS-CBN
^ ^{2} Originally aired on Q (now GMA News TV)

=== TV5 ===
The following are programs that debuted on TV5:

- January 3: Ultimate Fighting Championship
- January 24: Healing Galing sa TV (season 3)
- January 25: The Accidental Couple
- February 1: Reaksyon: Aplikante sa Senador
- February 6: Born to Be a Star, MTV Top 20 Pilipinas, Tasya Fantasya (2016) and Wattpad Presents: TV Movies
- February 8: Krypto the Superdog, Rat-A-Tat and The Sylvester & Tweety Mysteries
- February 14: UFC Vault
- February 15: Bakit Manipis ang Ulap?
- February 17: Bilang Pilipino: 2016 Premier
- February 22: Hi-5 Philippines (season 2)
- February 29: Ang Panday (2016), Arrow season 1 and Supernatural season 6
- March 6: Happy Truck HAPPinas
- March 7: Lilo & Stitch: The Series and The Jungle Bunch to the Rescue
- March 12: Taz-Mania and What's New, Scooby-Doo?
- March 13: Duck Dodgers
- March 21: Sofia the First (season 2)
- March 23: Asia's Next Top Model (cycle 4)
- April 18: Sheriff Callie's Wild West
- April 24: Healing Galing sa TV (season 4)
- April 25: Arrow season 2
- May 6: HAPPinas Happy Hour
- May 15: Kwentong Gilas (new season)
- May 16: Once Upon a Time season 1 and Supernatural season 7
- May 21: Sine Squad
- May 30: EZ Shop, Inspector Gadget (2015) and Jimmy Two-Shoes
- June 4: Outcast
- June 6: Smallville season 1
- June 18: 2016 Philippine Super Liga All-Filipino Conference
- June 19: Hacking the System, Penn Zero: Part-Time Hero, The 7D and Wander Over Yonder
- June 20: Ancient X-Files and World's Deadliest Animals
- June 27: Vikings season 1
- June 28: Supernatural season 8
- July 16: Catfish and Ex on the Beach
- July 17: Ridiculousness
- July 19: Smallville season 2
- July 23: PSL Spike Zone
- August 1: Once Upon a Time season 2
- August 18: Teen Wolf season 4 and The Walking Dead season 1
- August 20: CineFilipino
- August 22: La Reina del Sur and Wattpad Presents (season 2)
- August 23: Supernatural season 9
- August 25: Shark Men
- August 28: Healing Galing sa TV (season 5)
- September 12: Randy Cunningham: 9th Grade Ninja season 2
- September 13: Once Upon a Time season 3
- September 20: Nikita season 1 and Scandal season 1
- September 22: Friendzone
- September 25: Bugging Out
- October 3: Doc McStuffins (season 2)
- October 6: The Walking Dead season 2
- October 15: The Powerpuff Girls (2016) and We Bare Bears
- October 17: Arrow season 3 and The Flash season 1
- October 28: America's Funniest Home Videos
- December 19: The Vampire Diaries season 2

==== Re-runs ====
- February 1: Mickey Mouse Clubhouse
- March 7: Lilo & Stitch: The Series^{1}
- March 21: Kidlat
- May 11: Insider
- May 14: Public Atorni: Asunto o Areglo
- May 30: The Powerpuff Girls (1998)^{2}
- August 29: Krypto the Superdog, Mr. Bean: The Animated Series^{1}^{3}^{4}, Rat-A-Tat and The Looney Tunes Show^{2}
- September 19: Juan Direction
- October 3: Mickey Mouse Clubhouse

Notes
^ ^{1} Originally aired on ABS-CBN
^ ^{2} Originally aired on GMA
^ ^{3} Originally aired on Yey!
^ ^{4} Originally aired on Studio 23 (now S+A)

=== PTV ===
The following are programs that debuted on People's Television Network:

- January 16: Halo Halo House
- February 6: Entrep TV
- April 21: Hatol ng Bayan Electoral Primer
- May 2: O Shopping
- July 3: Motorsiklo News TV (season 3)
- July 11: Good Morning Pilipinas (2nd incarnation) and PTV News (2nd incarnation)
- July 24: Biyaheng Negosyo
- August 5: Business and Beyond
- August 6: Japan Video Topics
- August 27: ASEAN Spotlight TV
- October 9: Payo Alternatibo
- October 22: S.M.E. Go and Tahor: Your Ultimate Gamefowl Show
- October 30: Tulay: Your Bridge to Understanding, Peace and Prosperity
- December 17: The Breaking Point

=== IBC ===
The following are programs that debuted on IBC:

- February 27: Global China
- May 31: Shop Japan: Oakward Home Shopping
- September 13: Chicken Talk
- September 23: Business and Beyond
- October 8: Universities and Colleges Basketball League

=== Minor networks ===
The following are programs that debuted on minor networks:

- January 9: Ang Saya Saya on CLTV 36
- February 6: Word Hub on Net 25
- February 13: Jam (season 2) on Light Network
- February 15: The Two Sides of Ana (Ang Dalawang Mukha ni Ana) on BEAM TV
- February 17: Legally Yours with Atty. G on UNTV Life
- February 20: Shout Out: Sigaw ng Kabataan on Light Network
- February 22: Shop TV on BEAM TV
- February 22: UNTV Cup Inbound on UNTV Life
- March 5: Hapi ang Buhay (season 1) on Net 25
- March 27: Clark in Focus on CLTV 36
- March 28: Wish 1075 TV on UNTV Life
- April 4: Arangkada sa Umaga, Kasaysayang Throwback with BSJ, Lonely Pangets with Ariel Villasanta, Metro Central Luzon Ngayon, Metro Central Luzon Tonite, Metro Central Luzon Update and Pasada Ala-Una on CLTV 36
- April 4: In Case of Emergency on Net 25
- April 5: Belly Good with Hans Lee on CLTV 36
- April 9: Bits n' Pieces on Net 25
- April 11: Belly Good, Biz Mode, Dito Po Sa Amin, Ok Si Dok, Pera Pera Lang and Share and Like on CLTV 36
- April 12: Public Demand on CLTV 36
- April 14: Sandigang Legal on CLTV 36
- May 20: Perspektiba on CLTV 36
- June 6: Kapampangan Animation and Live Action Productions on CLTV 36
- June 13: Hataw Balita on UNTV Life
- July 18: UNTV C-News, UNTV Newsbreak and Serbisyong Kasangbahay on UNTV Public Service
- August 15: Balen at Balita on CLTV 36
- August 27: Ignite Gospel Music Festival (season 4) on Light Network
- September 3: Tara Lets! on CLTV 36
- September 4: Kids HQ on Light Network
- September 4: UNTV Cup (season 5) on UNTV Public Service
- October 3: Buhay Unleash on Light Network
- October 7: Diskurso on CLTV 36
- October 9: Barangay Basketball and Negosyo, Asenso, Atbp. (season 2) on Net 25
- October 10: Kilos Pronto on UNTV Public Service
- November 12: CENTRO: City of San Fernando, Pampanga on CLTV 36
- December 4: Chinatown TV on Net 25
- December 10: Hapi ang Buhay (season 2) on Net 25

==== Unknown dates ====
- Klaro Panalo, Lonely Pangets, Snap Shap and TeleVShop Powered by: ZIQ on CLTV 36
- Prayer for the Nation on Light TV

=== Other channels ===
The following are programs that debuted on other channels:

- January 2: Repeat After Me on 2nd Avenue
- January 3: Mga Kuwento ni Kuya Jun on Knowledge Channel
- January 4: Cooper Barrett's Guide to Surviving Life on Jack TV
- January 4: Balita Alas Kwatro, Balita sa Tanghali, Katapat at Karancho, Klinika on Air, Lapid Fire, Musika Noon at Ngayon, Otso Diretcho, Shalala and Friends, Showbiz Galore and Usapang Babae on 8TriTV
- January 5: May The Best House Win Canada on 2nd Avenue
- January 7: American Idol: The Farewell Season on ETC
- January 7: Date A Live season 2 on Hero
- January 8: Shades of Blue (season 1) on CT
- January 9: Telenovela on 2nd Avenue
- January 10: Hiding on CT
- January 10: Sam and Mard Show on Pinoy Xtreme
- January 13: New Girl season 5 on ETC
- January 15: Sa Ngalan ng Anak and Studio 5 Original Movies, Tabi Po The Feb 15 Club on Sari-Sari Channel
- January 16: Something to Chew On (season 4) on CNN Philippines
- January 16: Class 3-C Has a Secret on Sari-Sari Channel
- January 18: Major (season 1) on Yey!
- January 18: Crown of Tears and Timeless Love on Telenovela Channel
- January 19: Happy Tales Anime Series on Yey!
- January 22: 2016 PBA D-League Aspirants' Cup on AksyonTV and Hyper
- January 23: The 100 (season 3) on Jack TV
- January 24: Insights on Brigada News TV 34
- January 25: Sport Ka Lang! on 8TriTV
- January 26: Lucifer on Jack TV
- January 29: Kuya and Me on Sari-Sari Channel
- January 30: Foodtrip on Star World Philippines
- February 1: American Dad! season 12 on Jack TV
- February 2: Ao Haru Ride on Hero
- February 3: The Oxford Business Corner on ANC
- February 3: American Crime Story on CT
- February 4: State of Affairs on 2nd Avenue
- February 6: Buhay Modelo (Liquid Gold) hosted by China Roces on 8TriTV
- February 6: Psych season 8 on CT
- February 8: Real Talk (season 2) on CNN Philippines
- February 8: Starman on Jeepney TV
- February 9: The Story of the Filipino on CNN Philippines
- February 9: The Mentalist season 7 on CT
- February 10: The Boss with Cathy Yang on ANC
- February 11: #NoFilter on ANC
- February 12: Square Off: The Firm Debates season 12 on ANC
- February 12: Barrio Kulimlim on Sari-Sari Channel
- February 13: Billy & Billie and You're the Worst (season 1) on Jack TV
- February 15: Fox Sports Minute on Fox Sports 1
- February 15: @ Ur Service ni Madam Venus, Good Morning Philippines, Ito Ang Balita: Balita, Impormasyon, Talakayan, Payong Legal, The Batchmates Live and Yo Bro on 8TriTV
- February 15: New Day on CNN Philippines
- February 16: Litrato Philippines on 8TriTV
- February 18: Survivor: Kaôh Rōng on Jack TV
- February 19: Handa Pinas on 8TriTV
- February 19: Jam (season 2) on GMA News TV
- February 21: Drive (season 3) on CNN Philippines
- February 21: The Prisoner on CT
- February 21: Hangout with Donnalyn on MTV Pinoy
- February 22: Shout Out: Sigaw ng Kabataan on GMA News TV
- February 22: Metal Fight Beyblade: Baku on Yey!
- February 23: Major (season 2) on Yey!
- February 24: Space Brothers on Hero
- February 25: The Philippine Star's Wheels (season 3) on S+A
- February 28: Republic of Seniors with Eddie Ilarde on GMA News TV
- February 28: My Only Love on Sari-Sari Channel
- March 1: The Voice season 10 on AXN Asia
- March 2: Gourmet Girl Graffiti on Hero
- March 6: Undercover Boss (season 5) on CNN Philippines
- March 7: Project Runway season 13 on ETC
- March 7: The Flying House and T.U.F.F. Puppy (season 2) on Yey!
- March 8: Food Wars: Shokugeki no Soma on Hero
- March 8: PAW Patrol and Pleasant Goat and Big Big Wolf on Yey!
- March 9: Asia's Next Top Model (cycle 4) on Star World
- March 12: Private Ryan and Sexy Yannie on 8TriTV
- March 12: Damien on Jack TV
- March 12: Cilla on 2nd Avenue
- March 13: Best Houses Philippines and Bikinis and Boardwalks on Lifestyle
- March 14: EZ Shop on AksyonTV
- March 14: New Fitness Collection on Lifestyle
- March 17: The Americans season 4 on CT
- March 17: G.O.A.T. (season 3) on Fox Sports Asia
- March 19: Baby James and Monica Figueras on 8TriTV
- March 19: War & Peace on Lifestyle
- March 20: Smerconish on CNN Philippines
- March 20: Llamadista on S+A
- March 21: Sanjay & Craig on Yey!
- March 27: Dalawang Gabi on Sari-Sari Channel
- March 30: Major (season 3) on Yey!
- April 1: Clipped on Jack TV
- April 3: Terminator: The Sarah Connor Chronicles on Fox TV Philippines
- April 3: Funny Ka, Pare Ko (season 1) on Cine Mo!
- April 4: Oh Carol on 8TriTV
- April 4: Balitaan (2016) and The Boardroom on CNN Philippines
- April 5: Faking It season 2 on ETC
- April 5: Shop Japan: Oaklawn Home Shopping on GMA News TV
- April 6: Your Lie in April on Hero
- April 7: LXTV Open House on Lifestyle
- April 9: Banana Bites Ibang Klasiks on Cine Mo!
- April 9: Pizza Masters on Lifestyle
- April 10: Rick Stein From Venice to Istanbul on Lifestyle
- April 10: Rebel Music and The Art Of (season 2) on Jack TV
- April 11: CNN Philippines Global Newsroom on CNN Philippines
- April 11: Yuki Yuna is a Hero on Hero
- April 11: Finding Little Italy on Lifestyle
- April 11: Peppa Pig on Yey!
- April 14: Top 20 on ETC
- April 16: Graceful Living on ANC
- April 16: Metabeats with Jim and Toni Saret on Lifestyle
- April 17: Hungry with Chef JP Anglo on CNN Philippines
- April 17: Journeys: Chronicles of Our Asian Century on Global News Network
- April 22: Myx Wer U At? on Myx
- April 24: Frenemies in Love on Sari-Sari Channel
- April 24: Yu-Gi-Oh! 5D's season 3 on Yey!
- April 25: Starting Gate on Bloomberg TV Philippines
- April 25: Game of Thrones season 6 on HBO Asia
- April 26: Best Bars in America (season 2) and Car Matchmaker (season 2) on CT
- April 29: The Layover on 2nd Avenue
- April 29: Versailles on Lifestyle
- April 29: The Mysterious Case of Ana Madrigal on Sari-Sari Channel
- April 30: Bogart Case Files (season 3) on CNN Philippines
- May 1: Blood on Cine Mo!
- May 2: EZ Shop on Hyper/GMA News TV
- May 2: Dishkarte of the Day on GMA News TV
- May 3: The Fruit of Grisaia on Hero
- May 3: Back to Basics and Brunch at Bobby's on Lifestyle
- May 4: Myx Live on Myx
- May 5: Finding Carter (season 2) and Project Runway: Junior (season 1) on ETC
- May 5: Major (season 4) on Yey!
- May 6: Japanese documentary in English on GMA News TV
- May 6: Brooklyn Nine-Nine season 3 on Jack TV
- May 19: Ellen's Design Challenge (season 2) and Framework on 2nd Avenue
- May 20: The Millionaire Matchmaker (season 8) on ETC
- May 21: Extant (season 1) on 2nd Avenue
- May 24: Balita ng Bansa, Newsblast, Newsline Philippines, Newsline World, SMNI Morning Headlines and SMNI Newsbreak on SMNI News Channel
- May 25: Cyber Myx on Myx
- May 28: Modern Girls on Lifestyle
- May 28: From the Beautiful Country on Sari-Sari Channel
- May 28: Weekender World on SMNI News Channel
- May 29: Mariposa on Sari-Sari Channel
- June 1: Eksenang Banda on 8TriTV
- June 1: Myxed Lives on Myx
- June 2: Z Rangers on Yey!
- June 3: Beauty & the Beast season 4 on ETC
- June 4: Z Nation (season 2) on Jack TV
- June 5: Odd Mom Out on 2nd Avenue
- June 6: Follow-Up on DZRH News Television
- June 7: Yamada and the Seven Witches on Hero
- June 10: CNN Philippines Presents on CNN Philippines
- June 10: Oreca Battle on Hero
- June 10: Louie season 5 on Jack TV
- June 10: Major (season 5) on Yey!
- June 11: The Voice Kids season 3 on Yey!
- June 13: Legal Minds on DZRH News Television
- June 14: Math-dali on Knowledge Channel
- June 15: The Mindy Project (season 4) and Web Therapy season 4 on 2nd Avenue
- June 18: 2016 Philippine Super Liga All-Filipino Conference on AksyonTV and Hyper
- June 18: Tax TV on ANC
- June 18: Business Matters on Bloomberg TV Philippines
- June 19: Team Yey! on Yey!
- June 19: Sabrina's Kitchen on GMA News TV
- June 20: Shop TV on AksyonTV
- June 20: Mommy Manual on GMA News TV
- June 20: The Tempest on Telenovela Channel
- June 22: Madam Secretary season 2 on 2nd Avenue
- June 22: Pretty Little Liars season 7 on ETC
- June 24: The Working Class on GMA News TV
- June 24: Tastetimony on TV Maria
- June 25: Thunderbird Sabong Nation on Gametime TV
- June 26: AveNEU on INCTV
- June 26: Sa Bawat Patak ng Ulan on Sari-Sari Channel
- June 27: Good Morning Kakampi on K37 Digos
- June 28: Decoding Duterte on Pilipinas HD
- July 1: Sex & Drugs & Rock & Roll (season 2) on Jack TV
- July 3: Shalom on 8TriTV
- July 3: Funny Ka, Pare Ko (season 2) on Cine Mo!
- July 4: Real Talk (season 3) on CNN Philippines
- July 4: Project Runway All Stars season 4 on ETC
- July 4: Food Prints with Sandy Daza (season 4) on Lifestyle
- July 4: What Life Took From Me on Telenovela Channel
- July 7: Tyrant (season 3) on CT
- July 8: Top Chef season 13 and Top Chef Duels on 2nd Avenue
- July 8: Fantasista Doll on Hero
- July 9: Wazzup Pilipinas on 8TriTV
- July 9: Blue on CT
- July 9: MasterChef U.S. season 7 on Lifestyle
- July 10: Heartbeat on 2nd Avenue
- July 10: You're All Surrounded on Cine Mo!
- July 11: Buddy Complex on Hero
- July 11: Sir Tsip Reporting For Duty on 8TriTV
- July 13: Containment on CT
- July 14: Suits season 7 on Jack TV
- July 15: Major (season 6) on Yey!
- July 16: Nutri Ventures on Yey!
- July 17: Fish N' Town and Lado Oberto on S+A
- July 18: Hope From The Heart and OFW Family on 8TriTV
- July 19: Agri-cool-ture on Knowledge Channel
- July 21: ETC Music Specials on ETC
- July 21: Italy Unpacked (season 1) on 2nd Avenue
- July 22: Business and Beyond on GMA News TV
- July 24: Hotel Hell (season 2) on Lifestyle
- July 24: University Town (season 1) on S+A
- July 25: It Takes Gutz To Be A Gutierrez (season 4) and Soundtrip on E!
- July 26: INQ&A on Inquirer 990 Television
- July 27: The Magicians (season 1) on ETC
- July 29: C The Difference on Inquirer 990 Television
- July 30: Ang Kwarto sa May Hagdanan (season 1) on Sari-Sari Channel
- July 31: Flavors on CNN Philippines
- July 31: MoneyWise on GMA News TV
- August 1: Myx Daily Top 10 International Edition and Myx Daily Top 10 Pinoy on Myx
- August 1: News3 on PEPTV
- August 1: Kasangga Mo Ang Langit sa Radyo and Serbisyo Publiko on 8TriTV
- August 2: Star-Myu: High School Star Musical on Hero
- August 2: Galing Pook (season 3) on ANC
- August 5: Heart of a Champion on CNN Philippines
- August 6: Kapandesal on Inquirer 990 Television
- August 6: Bates Motel season 4 on Jack TV
- August 7: Married (season 2) on 2nd Avenue
- August 7: Everyday Sarap with CDO on GMA News TV
- August 7: I Live with Models and You're the Worst (season 2) on Jack TV
- August 8: CESAFI (season 16) on AksyonTV
- August 8: Rectify (season 2) on CT
- August 9: Satisfaction (season 2) and The Biggest Loser USA season 12: Battle of the Ages on 2nd Avenue
- August 11: Italy Unpacked (season 2) on 2nd Avenue
- August 11: Himouto! Umaru-chan on Hero
- August 14: Becoming Filipino on ANC
- August 14: Curiosity Got the Chef: Live Like a Local on Lifestyle
- August 14: Fight Farm on S+A
- August 17: Girl Eat World on Lifestyle
- August 20: Blindspot on 2nd Avenue
- August 20: Healthtv Embassy on Inquirer 990 Television
- August 23: Stand Up, Asia! on Comedy Central
- August 23: Dragon Collection on Hero
- August 26: Wives of House of No.2 on Sari-Sari Channel
- August 27: #MichaelAngelo (season 5) on GMA News TV
- August 27: Free!: Eternal Summer on Yey!
- August 29: How Do I Look? Asia (season 2) on Diva
- August 30: Ignite Gospel Music Festival (season 4) on GMA News TV
- September 1: Italy Unpacked (season 3) on 2nd Avenue
- September 1: Grimgar of Fantasy and Ash on Hero
- September 3: Pasada Astig on Jeepney TV
- September 3: The Crawl on Lifestyle
- September 3: Myx Olympics (season 4) on Myx
- September 3: Trending Max on PEPTV
- September 5: O Shopping on GMA News TV
- September 5: Bananas in Pyjamas (2011) and Wakfu on Yey!
- September 6: The Ellen DeGeneres Show season 14 on 2nd Avenue
- September 7: Active Raid (season 1) on Hero
- September 8: Full Throttle (season 2) on Fox Sports 1
- September 8: Malayang Talakayan on PEPTV
- September 11: The Biggest Loser USA season 13: No Excuses on 2nd Avenue
- September 11: Kids HQ and Who's Next? Pro-Boxing Series on GMA News TV
- September 17: Myx Moves Street Dance Competition on Myx
- September 18: Doowee Hooper Beat Band Competition (season 3) on S+A
- September 18: Blade Man on Cine Mo!
- September 19: Insecure on HBO
- September 19: The Service Road on CNN Philippines
- September 19: CSI: Crime Scene Investigation season 1 on Fox TV Philippines
- September 20: Jamie's 30 Minute Meals on 2nd Avenue
- September 20: The Good Place (season 1) on ETC
- September 20: Lucifer (season 2) and The Big Bang Theory season 10 on Jack TV
- September 20: The Voice season 11 on Star World
- September 21: This Is Us on 2nd Avenue
- September 21: New Girl season 6 and Scream Queens season 2 on ETC
- September 21: Bull on RTL CBS Entertainment
- September 22: Modern Family season 8 on 2nd Avenue
- September 22: Empire season 3 on Jack TV
- September 23: Pitch on ETC
- September 24: Culinary Journeys and Something to Chew On (season 4) on CNN Philippines
- September 24: Cold Case season 5, Fringe season 2, House season 6, The Mentalist season 3 and Without a Trace season 6 on Fox TV Philippines
- September 24: Nine: Nine Time Travels on RED by HBO
- September 24: Where is Franco? on Sari-Sari Channel
- September 25: Drive (season 4) on CNN Philippines
- September 26: The Source with Pinky Webb on CNN Philippines
- September 26: Bob's Burgers season 7, Family Guy season 16 and The Simpsons season 28 and The Last Man on Earth (season 3) on Jack TV
- September 26: Max Steel (season 2) on Yey!
- September 28: Quantico season 2 on AXN Asia
- October 3: Westworld on HBO
- October 5: The Flash season 3 on ETC and Jack TV
- October 6: Arrow season 5 on ETC and Jack TV
- October 8: Gossip Girl season 3, Nikita season 1, Smallville season 8 on Fox TV Philippines
- October 9: 24 season 8, 90210 season 3, Angel season 5, Bones season 10, Covert Affairs, Once Tree Hill season 6, Terminator: The Sarah Connor Chronicles (season 2) and Fox TV Philippines
- October 10: Headline Pilipinas on DZMM TeleRadyo
- October 10: Divorce on HBO
- October 11: 2 Broke Girls season 6 and Supergirl season 2 on ETC
- October 11: Active Raid (season 2) on Hero
- October 11: Supergirl (season 2) on Jack TV
- October 12: The Middle season 8 on 2nd Avenue
- October 13: The Amazing Race Asia season 5 on AXN Asia
- October 13: Chasing Maria Menounos on ETC
- October 14: Arlyn dela Cruz Reports on Inquirer 990 Television
- October 16: Shades of Blue (season 1) on 2nd Avenue
- October 16: NCIS: Los Angeles season 6 on Cine Mo!
- October 16: Are You the One? season 1 on ETC
- October 17: Life of Lies and Shelter for Love on Telenovela Channel
- October 20: CSI: Crime Scene Investigation season 2 on Fox TV Philippines
- October 21: The Layover (season 2) on 2nd Avenue
- October 22: The Vampire Diaries season 8 on ETC
- October 24: Crowded on 2nd Avenue
- October 24: The Big Story on Bloomberg TV Philippines
- October 24: It Girls on E!
- October 24: The Walking Dead season 7 on Fox
- October 27: The Eden of Grisaia on Hero
- October 28: Pure Genius on 2nd Avenue
- October 28: Go Local: Business That's Out There on Bloomberg TV Philippines
- October 29: Vital Signs on CNN Philippines
- October 29: Vintage Trip on GMA News TV
- October 30: The Art of Movement on CNN Philippines
- October 30: Kaya Mo Bang? The Fudgee Barr School Challenge (season 7) on S+A
- November 1: Brave New Girls on ETC
- November 1: People of Earth on Jack TV
- November 2: Life in Pieces (season 2) on 2nd Avenue
- November 3: Dayaw (season 2) on ANC
- November 5: Extant (season 2) on 2nd Avenue
- November 5: High Maintenance on Cinemax
- November 5: Underemployed on ETC
- November 5: Ang Kwarto sa May Hagdanan (season 2) on Sari-Sari Channel
- November 6: The Journey to the Crown on ETC
- November 6: Saturday Night Live season 41 on Jack TV
- November 7: Todo Arangkada Balita on 8TriTV
- November 7: Undateable (season 3) on Jack TV
- November 8: WWE Raw on Fox Sports 1
- November 9: WWE SmackDown on Fox Sports 1
- November 14: Bitten (season 1) on ETC
- November 14: Yu-Gi-Oh! Arc-V season 1 on Hero
- November 15: This Life on 2nd Avenue
- November 17: Cash Cab Philippines (season 2) on AXN Asia
- November 17: Project Runway season 14 on ETC
- November 18: Food Wars!: Shokugeki no Soma – Second Plate on Hero
- November 20: Orange Marmalade on Cine Mo!
- November 22: CSI: Crime Scene Investigation season 3 on Fox TV Philippines
- November 25: 10 Signatures to Bargaid With God on Sari-Sari Channel
- November 26: Tripped on Jack TV
- November 27: ASEAN Basketball League on S+A
- November 28: Alerto 38 on Bandera News TV 38
- November 30: WWE 205 Live on WWE Network
- December 1: Inside Congress on Global News Network
- December 1: Taking Heads on GMA News TV
- December 1: Christmas from the Heart on SMNI
- December 2: River of Worship on GMA News TV
- December 3: Blood, Sweat and Heels on ETC
- December 3: On Air on RED by HBO
- December 4: Four Weddings (season 1) on ETC
- December 10: HIM on Jack TV
- December 11: Happy Life on GMA News TV
- December 13: America's Next Top Model (cycle 23) on ETC
- December 14: Babylon on AMC
- December 14: The Ultimate BROcation on KIX
- December 15: Star on ETC
- December 17: Good Doctor on Jeepney TV
- December 23: CSI: Crime Scene Investigation season 4 on Fox TV Philippines
- December 23: Haikyu!! season 2 on Hero
- December 25: The Great Christmas Light Fight (season 2) on 2nd Avenue
- December 27: Chicago P.D. season 3 on CT

==== Unknown dates ====
- January: Truth Uncovered (season 2) on INCTV
- January: Red Horse Beer: Kaya Mo To on CNN Philippines
- January: Hiphop sa Pinas and Liga Pilipinas on Pinoy Xtreme
- January: Inside the PGA Tour on AksyonTV
- March: Inside the PGA Tour and UFC Ultimate Insider on AksyonTV
- April: May the Best House Win US on 2nd Avenue
- April: Mabuhay Football League on 8TriTV
- June: Salpukan 360 on Pinoy Xtreme

==== Re-runs ====
- January 2: Ina, Kasusuklaman Ba Kita? on Fox Filipino^{2}
- January 4: Ikaw Sana and Mundo Mo'y Akin on Fox Filipino^{2}
- January 6: Haikyu!! season 1 on Hero^{1}^{5}
- January 8: Digimon Adventure 02 on Hero^{1}^{5}
- January 9: Pieta on Jeepney TV^{1}
- January 11: Pinoy Big Brother Revisited: Celebrity Edition season 1 on Jeepney TV^{1}
- January 16: Kuroko's Basketball season 2 on Yey!^{1}^{9}
- January 17: Power Rangers Samurai on Hero^{1}^{14}
- January 18: Habang May Buhay (2010) on Jeepney TV^{1}
- January 18: Power Rangers Samurai on Yey!^{1}^{9}^{14}
- January 20: Kuroko's Basketball season 1 on Hero^{1}^{5}
- January 23: Digimon Tamers on Yey!^{1}^{9}
- January 28: Minsan Lang Kita Iibigin on Jeepney TV^{1}
- February 2: Naruto on Yey!^{1}^{14}
- February 6: El Tigre: The Adventures of Manny Rivera^{1}^{3} and Voltron Force^{1}^{6} on Yey!
- February 8: May Minamahal on Jeepney TV^{1}
- February 9: Agimat: Ang Mga Alamat ni Ramon Revilla: Tonyong Bayawak on Jeepney TV^{1}
- February 10: Magic Kaito 1412^{2} and Yu-Gi-Oh! Zexal season 1^{1}^{5}^{6} on Hero
- February 15: Dwarfina on Fox Filipino^{2}
- February 15: Rubi (2010) on Jeepney TV^{1}
- February 22: My Bride Is a Mermaid on Hero^{14}
- February 22: Got to Believe and Onli In Da Pilipins on Jeepney TV^{1}
- February 25: Kuroko's Basketball (season 2) on Hero^{1}^{5}
- February 27: !Oka Tokat on Jeepney TV^{1}
- February 28: Animazing Tales on Hero^{1}^{5}
- February 28: Precious Hearts Romances Presents: Kristine on Jeepney TV^{1}
- February 29: A Promise of a Thousand Days on Jeepney TV^{1}
- March 7: Next Level Na, Game Ka Na Ba? on Jeepney TV^{1}
- March 9: Power Rangers Mystic Force on Yey!^{1}
- March 14: Goin' Bulilit Classics (Year 3) on Jeepney TV^{1}
- March 14: Amaya and Muli on Fox Filipino^{2}
- March 17: Si Mary at Ang Lihim na Hardin on Yey!^{1}
- March 20: Digimon Frontier on Yey!^{1}^{9}^{14}
- March 21: The Legal Wife on Jeepney TV^{1}
- March 25: Ultraman Mebius on Yey!^{1}^{8}^{15}
- March 29: My Little Juan on Yey!^{1}
- April 4: Kokey^{1}^{5}, Komiks: Da Adventures of Pedro Penduko^{1}^{5} and My Girlfriend Is a Gumiho^{1}^{14} on Jeepney TV
- April 5: Digimon Savers on Hero^{1}
- April 9: Digimon Frontier on Hero^{1}^{5}^{14}
- April 13: Baywatch (seasons 5 and 6) on Jeepney TV^{14}
- April 25: Unforgettable Love on Jeepney TV^{1}
- April 25: Power Rangers Megaforce on Yey!^{1}
- May 2: The Love Story of Kang Chi on Jeepney TV^{1}
- May 3: Naruto: Shippuden season 7 on Hero^{1}
- May 9: Rubi (2010) on Jeepney TV^{1}
- May 10: Judy Abbott on Yey!^{1}
- May 16: Legacy on Fox Filipino^{2}
- May 16: Palibhasa Lalake on Jeepney TV^{2}
- May 21: Digimon Savers on Yey!^{1}^{9}
- May 23: Angelito: Ang Bagong Yugto and Maging Sino Ka Man: Ang Pagbabalik on Jeepney TV^{1}
- May 24: Yu-Gi-Oh! Zexal season 2 on Hero^{5}
- May 27: Super Inggo at ang Super Tropa on Yey!^{1}^{9}
- May 28: Teenage Mutant Ninja Turtles (2012) season 2 on Yey!^{1}
- May 29: Yu-Gi-Oh! GX season 1 on Yey!^{1}^{9}
- June 6: Gotham on Jack TV^{13}
- June 6: Honesto, Juan dela Cruz and Pilipinas, Game Ka Na Ba? (Year 3) on Jeepney TV^{1}
- June 7: Komiks on Yey!^{1}^{8}
- June 13: Goin' Bulilit Classics (Year 4), My Binondo Girl and When a Man Falls in Love on Jeepney TV^{1}
- June 13: T.U.F.F. Puppy (season 1) on Yey!^{1}
- June 20: My Husband's Lover on Fox Filipino^{2}
- June 21: Power Rangers Wild Force on Yey!^{1}^{9}
- June 27: Naruto: Shippuden season 8 on Hero^{1}
- July 4: Apoy sa Dagat on Jeepney TV^{1}
- July 5: The Trap Family Singers on Yey!^{1}^{15}
- July 9: Avatar: The Legend of Aang on Yey!^{1}^{3}^{18}
- July 11: Pinocchio, The Producers and Top 20 Funniest on GMA News TV^{2}
- July 11: Kuroko's Basketball (season 2) on Hero^{1}^{5}
- July 12: The Biggest Loser USA season 11: Couples 4 on 2nd Avenue^{17}
- July 12: Empress Ki on GMA News TV^{2}
- July 14: Digimon Tamers^{1}^{9} and Komiks Presents: Kapitan Boom^{1}^{8} on Yey!
- July 16: Free! (season 1)^{9} and Mr. Bean: The Animated Series^{1}^{14} on Yey!
- July 18: Meteor Garden (2001) on Jeepney TV^{1}^{2}^{15}
- July 21: Midnight DJ on Sari-Sari Channel^{3}
- July 25: Pahiram ng Sandali on Fox Filipino^{2}
- July 25: Fanboy & Chum Chum on Yey!^{1}
- July 26: Heroman on Yey!^{1}^{6}^{9}
- July 27: Komiks Presents: Varga on Yey!^{1}^{8}
- August 3: Komiks Presents: Flash Bomba on Yey!^{1}^{8}
- August 5: America's Next Top Model: All Stars on Lifestyle^{10}
- August 8: Future's Choice on GMA News TV^{2}
- August 12: Komiks Presents: Tiny Tony on Yey!^{1}^{8}
- August 13: Dyesebel (2014) on Jeepney TV^{1}
- August 15: King of Ambition on GMA News TV^{2}
- August 15: Angel Eyes on Jeepney TV^{1}
- August 16: Power Rangers Ninja Storm on Yey!^{1}^{14}
- August 22: Indio on Fox Filipino^{2}
- August 23: Komiks: Da Adventures of Pedro Penduko on Yey!^{1}^{8}
- August 29: Bones season 11 on 2nd Avenue^{13}
- August 30: Remi, Nobody's Girl on Yey!^{1}
- September 2: Arakawa Under the Bridge on Hero
- September 3: Suits season 4 on 2nd Avenue^{11}
- September 4: Selfie on ETC
- September 4: Yu-Gi-Oh! GX season 2 on Yey!^{9}
- September 5: Free! (seasons 1 and 2) on Hero^{5}
- September 5: Dream Dad and Gulong ng Palad (2006) on Jeepney TV^{1}
- September 5: Jang Geum's Dream on Yey!^{2}^{15}
- September 14: Your Lie in April on Hero
- September 18: Wansapanataym presents: My App #Boyfie on Jeepney TV^{1}
- September 19: Coffee Prince (2007) on GMA News TV^{2}
- September 19: Fated to Love You (Korean version) and Two Wives (2014) on Jeepney TV^{1}
- September 22: Quizon Avenue on Jeepney TV^{1}
- September 23: Digimon Frontier on Yey!^{1}^{9}^{14}
- September 24: Suits season 5 on 2nd Avenue^{11}
- September 26: Adarna on Fox Filipino^{2}
- October 1: Dugong Buhay on Jeepney TV^{1}
- October 3: Asian Horror Stories on GMA News TV^{2}
- October 3: Kuroko's Basketball (season 2) on Hero^{1}^{5}
- October 6: Power Rangers Megaforce on Yey!^{1}
- October 7: Komiks: Pedro Penduko at ang Mga Engkantao on Yey!^{1}^{8}
- October 8: Blood on Jeepney TV^{4}
- October 15: Kuroko's Basketball (season 2) on Yey!^{1}^{9}
- October 17: Secret Garden on GMA News TV^{2}
- October 17: Be Careful with My Heart, Jane the Virgin season 1 and Princess Hours on Jeepney TV^{1}
- October 24: Mga Mata ni Anghelita on Fox Filipino^{2}
- October 24: Nathaniel on Jeepney TV^{1}
- October 25: Digimon Tamers on Hero^{1}^{5}
- October 31: Digimon Frontier on Hero^{1}^{5}^{14}
- October 31: Komiks: Nasaan Ka Maruja? on Jeepney TV^{1}
- November 1: Blue Dragon (season 1) on Yey!^{1}^{9}^{14}
- November 3: Suits season 6 on 2nd Avenue^{11}
- November 7: Kuroko's Basketball season 3 on Hero
- November 7: Care Bears: Welcome to Care-a-Lot on Yey!^{16}
- November 12: The Legend of Korra on Yey!^{1}
- November 14: Muling Buksan ang Puso on Jeepney TV^{1}
- November 14: Super Inggo on Yey!^{1}^{8}
- November 21: Paano Ba ang Mangarap? on Fox Filipino^{2}
- November 25: My Bride Is a Mermaid on Hero
- November 27: Yu-Gi-Oh! Zexal season 2 on Yey!^{9}
- November 28: Women in the Sun on GMA News TV^{2}
- December 2: Naruto: Shippuden (season 7) on Hero^{1}
- December 2: Digimon Savers on Yey!^{1}^{9}
- December 5: Lovers in Paris on Jeepney TV^{1}
- December 6: Naruto: Shippuden season 1 on Yey!^{1}^{9}
- December 10: Secret Love on GMA News TV^{2}
- December 12: Gintama': Enchōsen on Hero
- December 12: Give Love on Christmas, Huwag Ka Lang Mawawala and Ikaw ay Pag-Ibig on Jeepney TV^{1}
- December 29: Samurai X on Hero^{1}^{14}^{15}
- Notes
1. ^ ^{a} Originally aired on ABS-CBN
2. ^ ^{b} Originally aired on GMA
3. ^ ^{c} Originally aired on TV5
4. ^ ^{d} Originally aired on Cine Mo!
5. ^ ^{e} Originally aired on Yey!
6. ^ ^{f} Originally aired on S+A
7. ^ ^{g} Originally aired on GMA News TV
8. ^ ^{h} Originally aired on Jeepney TV
9. ^ ^{i} Originally aired on Hero
10. ^ ^{j} Originally aired on ETC
11. ^ ^{k} Originally aired on Jack TV
12. ^ ^{l} Originally aired on 2nd Avenue
13. ^ ^{m} Originally aired on CT
14. ^ ^{n} Originally aired on Studio 23 (now S+A)
15. ^ ^{o} Originally aired on Q (now GTV)
16. ^ ^{p} Originally aired on 9TV (now CNN Philippines)
17. ^ ^{q} Originally aired on TGC (now defunct)
18. ^ ^{r} Originally aired on ABC (now TV5)

=== Video streaming services ===
The following are programs that debuted on video streaming services:

- July 14: Mr. Robot (season 2) on Iflix
- July 14: WWE Cruiserweight Classic on WWE Network
- July 16: Stranger Things on Netflix
- August 13: The Get Down on Netflix
- August 18: Hunters on Iflix
- September 16: Voltes V on Iflix
- September 20: The Good Place (season 1) on Iflix
- October 1: Marvel's Luke Cage on Netflix
- October 3: Ash vs Evil Dead (season 2) on HOOQ
- October 21: Roadies on Iflix
- November 4: The Crown on Netflix
- November 17: Channel Zero (season 1) and Legend of the Blue Sea on Iflix
- November 26: Gilmore Girls: A Year in the Life (miniseries) on Netflix
- December 9: Captive and White Rabbit Project on Netflix
- December 15: Devious Maids season 4 on Iflix
- December 17: The OA on Netflix
- December 23: Aftermath, Descendants of the Sun and Reply 1988 on Iflix
- December 28: Chasing Cameron on Netflix
- December 29: Humans (season 1) on Iflix

==== Unknown dates ====
- August: Lucifer on HOOQ
- September: House of Cards season 4 on Netflix
- November: Limitless on Iflix

== Returning or renamed programs ==
=== Major networks ===
Show	Last aired	Retitled as/Season/Notes	Channel	Return date
Tawag ng Tanghalan	1989	Same (segment of It's Showtime)	ABS-CBN	January 2
ASAP 20	2015	ASAP (2nd incarnation)	ABS-CBN	January 3
In Touch with Dr. Charles Stanley	2015	Same	GMA	January 3
Hayate the Combat Butler	2014	Same (season 3: "Can't Take My Eyes Off You")	GMA	January 9
Pokémon	2015 (9TV) / 2016 (season 17: "XY")	Same (season 14: "Black and White")	GMA	January 11
Pilipinas Got Talent	2013	Same (season 5)	ABS-CBN	January 23
Healing Galing sa TV	2016	Same (season 3)	TV5	January 24
Kapamilya, Deal or No Deal	2015	Same (season 5: "Barangay Edition")	ABS-CBN	January 25
24 Oras Central Visayas	2016	Balitang Bisdak (2nd incarnation)	GMA Cebu	February 1
24 Oras North Central Luzon	2016	Balitang Amianan (2nd incarnation)	GMA Dagupan	February 1
Wowowin	2016	Same	GMA	February 1
Tasya Fantasya	2008 (GMA)	Same (2016)	TV5	February 6
History with Lourd	2016	Same (season 6) (new day and timeslot)	TV5	February 9
Philippine Basketball Association	2016 (season 41: "Philippine Cup")	Same (season 41: "Commissioner's Cup")	TV5	February 10
Philippine Super Liga	2015 (season 3: "Grand Prix Conference")	Same (season 4: "Invitational Cup")	TV5 / AksyonTV	February 12
Hayate the Combat Butler	2016	Same (season 4: "Cuties")	GMA	February 20
Hi-5 Philippines	2015	Same (season 2)	TV5	February 22
Supernatural	2015	Same (season 6)	TV5	February 29
Bakugan Battle Brawlers	2012	Same (season 4: "Mechtanium Surge")	GMA	March 5
Asia's Next Top Model	2015 (GMA)	Same (season 4: "Cycle 4")	TV5	March 23
Kung Fu Panda: Legends of Awesomeness	2015	Same (season 3)	ABS-CBN	March 27
Naruto: Shippuden	2015	Same (season 8)	ABS-CBN	March 28
Family Feud	2011 (GMA; 2nd incarnation; season 3: "The Showdown Edition")	Same (3rd incarnation)	ABS-CBN	April 9
Healing Galing sa TV	2016	Same (season 4)	TV5	April 24
Bleach	2014	Same (season 6)	GMA	April 25
Arrow	2016	Same (season 2)	TV5	April 25
Philippine Super Liga	2016 (season 4: "Invitational Cup")	Same (season 4: "Beach Volleyball Cup")	TV5 / AksyonTV	May 7
Alamat	2015	Same (season 2)	GMA	May 15
Supernatural	2016	Same (season 7)	TV5	May 16
The Voice Kids	2015	Same (season 3)	ABS-CBN	May 28
EZ Shop	2008 (ABC)	Same	TV5	May 30
Inspector Gadget	1988 (IBC) / 2001 (GMA)	Same (2015)	TV5	May 30
Home Foodie	2015	Same (season 2)	GMA	June 13
Pokémon	2016 (season 14: "Black and White")	Same (season 15: "Black & White: Rival Destinies")	GMA	June 13
Philippine Super Liga	2016 (season 4: "Beach Volleyball Cup")	Same (season 4: "All-Filipino Cup")	TV5 / AksyonTV	June 19
Supernatural	2016	Same (season 8)	TV5	June 28
Pinoy Big Brother	2015 (season 6: "737")	Same (season 7: "Lucky 7")	ABS-CBN	July 11
Pinoy Big Brother	2015 (season 6: "737 GOLD")	Same (season 7: "Mga Kwento ng Dream Team ni Kuya")	ABS-CBN	July 11
Philippine Basketball Association	2016 (season 41: "Commissioner's Cup")	Same (season 41: "Governors' Cup")	TV5 / PBA Rush	July 15
Encantadia	2006	Same (2016)	GMA	July 18
Minute to Win It	2014	Minute to Win It: Last Man Standing (season 1)	ABS-CBN	July 18
Smallville	2016	Same (season 2)	TV5	July 19
Once Upon a Time	2016	Same (season 2)	TV5	August 1
Teen Wolf	2015	Same (season 4)	TV5	August 18
Pokémon	2016 (season 15: "Black & White: Rival Destinies")	Same (season 16: "Black & White: Adventures in Unova and Beyond")	GMA	August 22
Supernatural	2016	Same (season 9)	TV5	August 23
Healing Galing sa TV	2016	Same (season 5)	TV5	August 28
Once Upon a Time	2016	Same (season 3)	TV5	September 13
The Walking Dead	2016	Same (season 2)	TV5	October 6
Philippine Super Liga	2016 (season 4: "All-Filipino Cup")	Same (season 4: "Grand Prix Conference")	TV5 / AksyonTV	October 8
The Powerpuff Girls (1998)	2002 (GMA) / 2012 (TV5)	Same (2016)	TV5	October 15
Arrow	2016	Same (season 3)	TV5	October 17
National Basketball Association	2016	Same (2016–17 season)	ABS-CBN	October 29
Heart of Asia Presents	2016	Same (season 2)	GMA	November 14
Philippine Basketball Association	2016 (season 41: "Governors' Cup")	Same (season 42: "Philippine Cup")	TV5	November 20
The Vampire Diaries	2015	Same (season 2)	TV5	December 19

=== State-owned networks ===
Show	Last aired	Retitled as/Season/Notes	Channel	Return date
CHInoyTV	2015	Same (season 20)	PTV / Living Asia Channel	February 7
lskoolmates	2016	Same (season 4)	PTV	April 24
Motorsiklo News TV	2014	Same (season 3)	PTV	July 2
Good Morning Pilipinas	2001	Same (2nd incarnation)	PTV	July 11
PTV News	1997	Same (2nd incarnation)	PTV	July 11

=== Minor networks ===
Show	Last aired	Retitled as/Season/Notes	Channel	Return date
Jam	2015	Same (season 2)	Light Network	February 13
Ok Si Dok	2015	Same (new season)	CLTV	April 11
Hataw Balita	2013	Same (2nd incarnation)	UNTV	June 13
UNTV Cup	2016	Same (season 5)	UNTV	September 4
Hapi ang Buhay	2016	Same (season 2)	Net 25	December 10

=== Other channels ===
Show	Last aired	Retitled as/Season/Notes	Channel	Return date
American Idol	2015	Same (season 15: The Farewell Season)	ETC on SBN / Star World Philippines	January 7
Date A Live	2013	Same (season 2)	Hero	January 7
New Girl	2015	Same (season 5)	ETC	January 13
Something to Chew On	2016	Same (season 4)	CNN Philippines	January 16
PBA D-League	2015 (IBC; season 4: "Foundation Cup")	Same (season 5: "Aspirants' Cup")	AksyonTV / Hyper	January 21
The 100	2015	Same (season 3)	Jack TV	January 23
UAAP Men's & Women's Volleyball	2015	Same (season 78)	S+A	January 30
American Dad!	2015	Same (season 12)	Jack TV	February 1
Psych	2015	Same (season 8)	CT	February 6
Real Talk	2016	Same (season 2)	CNN Philippines	February 8
The Mentalist	2016	Same (season 7)	CT	February 9
UAAP Men's Football	2015	Same (season 78)	S+A	February 11
Survivor	2015 (season 31: "Cambodia")	Same (season 32: "Kaôh Rōng")	Jack TV	February 18
Jam	2015	Same (season 2)	GMA News TV	February 19
Drive	2016	Same (season 3)	CNN Philippines	February 21
Law & Order: Special Victims Unit	2015	Same (season 14)	CT	February 22
The Voice	2015	Same (season 10)	AXN Asia	March 1
Undercover Boss	2015	Same (season 5)	CNN Philippines	March 6
Project Runway	2015	Same (season 13)	ETC on SBN	March 7
T.U.F.F. Puppy	2014 (ABS-CBN)	Same (season 2)	Yey!	March 7
The Americans	2015	Same (season 4)	CT	March 17
Balitaan	2014 (PTV)	Same (2016)	CNN Philippines	April 4
Faking It	2016	Same (season 2)	ETC on SBN	April 5
The Art Of	2015	Same (season 2)	Jack TV	April 10
Myx Wer U At?	2015	Same (new season)	Myx	April 22
Best Bars in America	2015	Same (season 2)	CT	April 26
Car Matchmaker	2015	Same (season 2)	CT	April 26
Bogart Case Files	2015	Same (season 3)	CNN Philippines	April 30
Myx Live	2016	Same (new season)	Myx	May 4
Finding Carter	2016	Same (season 2)	ETC on SBN	May 5
Brooklyn Nine-Nine	2015	Same (season 3)	Jack TV	May 6
Women's National Basketball Association	2015	Same (2016 season)	S+A / Basketball TV / NBA Premium TV	May 15
Single/Single	2015	Same (season 2)	Cinema One	May 15
Ellen's Design Challenge	2015	Same (season 2)	2nd Avenue on RJTV	May 19
The Millionaire Matchmaker	2015	Same (season 8)	ETC on SBN	May 20
Shakey's V-League	2015 (season 12: "Open Conference")	Same (season 13: "Open Conference")	S+A	May 28
Myxed Lives	2015	Same (new season)	Myx	June 1
PBA D-League	2016 (season 5: "Aspirants' Cup")	Same (season 5: "Foundation Cup")	AksyonTV / Hyper	June 2
Beauty and the Beast	2015	Same (season 4)	ETC on SBN	June 3
Z Nation	2016	Same (season 2)	Jack TV	June 4
Louie	2015	Same (season 5)	Jack TV	June 10
The Mindy Project	2015	Same (season 4)	2nd Avenue on RJTV	June 15
Web Therapy	2015	Same (season 4)	2nd Avenue on RJTV	June 15
Pretty Little Liars	2016	Same (season 7)	ETC on SBN	June 22
Madam Secretary	2015	Same (season 2)	2nd Avenue on RJTV	June 22
National Collegiate Athletic Association	2015	Same (season 92)	S+A	June 25
Sex & Drugs & Rock & Roll	2015	Same (season 2)	Jack TV	July 1
Real Talk	2016	Same (season 3)	CNN Philippines	July 4
Project Runway All Stars	2015	Same (season 4)	ETC on SBN	July 4
Tyrant	2015	Same (season 3)	CT	July 7
Top Chef	2015	Same (season 13)	2nd Avenue on RJTV	July 8
MasterChef U.S.	2015	Same (season 7)	Lifestyle	July 9
Warehouse 13	2014	Same (season 5)	CT	July 10
Suits	2016	Same (season 7)	Jack TV	July 14
It Takes Gutz to Be a Gutierrez	2015	Same (season 4)	E!	July 25
Shakey's V-League	2016 (season 13: "Open Conference")	Same (season 13: "Collegiate Conference")	S+A	July 30
Bates Motel	2016	Same (season 4)	Jack TV	August 6
You're the Worst	2016	Same (season 2)	Jack TV	August 7
Married	2015	Same (season 2)	2nd Avenue on RJTV	August 7
Rectify	2015	Same (season 2)	CT	August 8
Satisfaction	2015	Same (season 2)	2nd Avenue on RJTV	August 9
The Biggest Loser	2015 (TGC; season 11: "Couples 4")	Same (seasons 12: "Battle of the Ages")	2nd Avenue on RJTV	August 9
Italy Unpacked	2016	Same (season 2)	2nd Avenue on RJTV	August 11
#MichaelAngelo	2016	Same (season 5)	GMA News TV	August 27
Italy Unpacked	2016	Same (season 3)	2nd Avenue on RJTV	September 1
Myx Olympics	2015	Same (season 4)	Myx	September 3
UAAP Men's Basketball	2015	Same (season 79)	S+A	September 4
The Ellen DeGeneres Show	2016	Same (season 14)	2nd Avenue on RJTV	September 6
The Biggest Loser	2016 (season 12: "Battle of the Ages")	Same (season 13: "No Excuses")	2nd Avenue on RJTV	September 11
American Horror Story	2016 (season 5: "Hotel")	Same (season 6: "Roanoke")	Jack TV	September 17
Doowee Hooper Beat Band Competition	2015	Same (season 3)	S+A	September 18
Lucifer	2016	Same (season 2)	Jack TV	September 20
The Big Bang Theory	2016	Same (season 10)	Jack TV	September 20
New Girl	2016	Same (season 6)	ETC on SBN	September 21
Scream Queens	2015	Same (season 2)	ETC on SBN	September 21
Empire	2016	Same (season 3)	Jack TV	September 22
Survivor	2016 (season 32: "Kaôh Rōng")	Same (season 33: "Millennials vs. Gen X")	Jack TV	September 22
Modern Family	2016	Same (season 8)	2nd Avenue on RJTV	September 22
Something to Chew On	2016	Same (season 4)	CNN Philippines	September 24
Shakey's V-League	2016 (season 13: "Collegiate Conference")	Same (season 13: "Reinforced Open Conference")	S+A	September 24
Drive	2016	Same (season 4)	CNN Philippines	September 25
The Simpsons	2016	Same (season 28)	Jack TV	September 26
Bob's Burgers	2016	Same (season 7)	Jack TV	September 26
Family Guy	2016	Same (season 16)	Jack TV	September 26
The Last Man on Earth	2016	Same (season 3)	Jack TV	September 26
Max Steel	2015	Same (season 2)	Yey!	September 26
The Flash	2016	Same (season 3)	ETC on SBN / Jack TV	October 5
Arrow	2016	Same (season 5)	2nd Avenue on RJTV / Jack TV	October 6
2 Broke Girls	2016	Same (season 6)	ETC on SBN	October 11
Supergirl	2016	Same (season 2)	ETC on SBN / Jack TV	October 11
The Middle	2016	Same (season 8)	2nd Avenue on RJTV	October 12
The Layover	2016	Same (season 2)	2nd Avenue on RJTV	October 21
The Vampire Diaries	2016	Same (season 8)	ETC on SBN	October 22
National Basketball Association	2016	Same (2016–17 season)	S+A / Basketball TV / NBA Premium TV	October 26
Kaya Mo Bang?	2015 (season 6: "The Fudgee Barr Adventures")	Same (season 7: "The Fudgee Barr School Challenge")	S+A	October 30
Life in Pieces	2016	Same (season 2)	2nd Avenue on RJTV	November 2
Extant	2016	Same (season 2)	2nd Avenue on RJTV	November 5
Saturday Night Live	2015	Same (season 41)	Jack TV	November 6
Undateable	2016	Same (season 3)	Jack TV	November 7
Cash Cab Philippines	2015	Same (season 2)	AXN Asia	November 17
Project Runway	2016	Same (season 14)	ETC on SBN	November 17
America's Next Top Model	2015	Same (cycle 23)	ETC on SBN	December 13
Haikyū!!	2015 (ABS-CBN / Yey!)	Same (season 2)	Hero	December 23
The Great Christmas Light Fight	2015	Same (season 2)	2nd Avenue on RJTV	December 25
Four Weddings	2016	Same (season 2)	ETC on SBN	December 25
Chicago P.D.	2015	Same (season 3)	CT	December 27

== Programs transferring networks ==
=== Major networks ===
Date	Show	No. of seasons	Moved from	Moved to
January 3	Ultimate Fighting Championship	—N/a	ABS-CBN / S+A / Balls (now S+A HD)	TV5 / Hyper
February 9	Krypto the Superdog	—N/a	RPN (now CNN Philippines)	TV5
March 7	Lilo & Stitch: The Series	—N/a	ABS-CBN	TV5
March 23	Asia's Next Top Model	4	GMA	TV5
April 9	Family Feud	—N/a	GMA	ABS-CBN
May 16	Once Upon a Time	—N/a	S+A	TV5
May 30	Inspector Gadget	—N/a	IBC / GMA (as the original 1983 TV series)	TV5 (as the remake)
June 6	Smallville	—N/a	Studio 23 (now S+A)	TV5
August 15	H2O: Just Add Water	—N/a	Q (now GMA News TV)	GMA
August 18	The Walking Dead	—N/a	Fox Filipino	TV5
August 29	Mr. Bean: The Animated Series	—N/a	ABS-CBN / Yey!	TV5
September 20	Nikita	—N/a	ETC	TV5
September 20	Scandal	—N/a	Studio 23 (now S+A)	TV5
October 28	America's Funniest Home Videos	—N/a	RPN (now CNN Philippines) / IBC / SBN (now ETC)	TV5

=== State-owned networks ===
Date	Show	No. of seasons	Moved from	Moved to
August 6	Japan Video Topics	—N/a	IBC	PTV

=== Minor networks ===
Date	Show	No. of seasons	Moved from	Moved to
February 15	The Two Sides of Ana (Ang Dalawang Mukha ni Ana)	—N/a	IBC	BEAM TV

=== Other channels ===
Date	Show	No. of seasons	Moved from	Moved to
January 8	PGA Tour	—N/a	Solar Sports	Hyper
January 22	PBA D-League	7	IBC	AksyonTV / Hyper
February 2	Naruto	—N/a	ABS-CBN / Studio 23 (now S+A) / Hero	Yey!
February 6	El Tigre: The Adventures of Manny Rivera	—N/a	ABS-CBN / TV5	Yey!
February 6	Voltron Force	—N/a	ABS-CBN / S+A	Yey!
February 10	Magic Kaito 1412	—N/a	GMA	Hero
February 22	My Bride Is a Mermaid	—N/a	Studio 23 (now S+A)	Hero
February 22	Metal Fight Beyblade: Baku	—N/a	ABS-CBN	Yey!
February 29	A Promise of a Thousand Days	—N/a	ABS-CBN	Jeepney TV
March 7	The Flying House	—N/a	ABS-CBN	Yey!
March 7	T.U.F.F. Puppy	—N/a	ABS-CBN	Yey!
March 17	Si Mary at Ang Lihim na Hardin	—N/a	ABS-CBN	Yey!
March 20	Digimon Frontier	—N/a	ABS-CBN / Studio 23 (now S+A) / Hero	Yey!
April 4	Balitaan	—N/a	PTV	CNN Philippines
April 4	My Girlfriend Is a Gumiho	—N/a	ABS-CBN	Jeepney TV
April 25	Unforgettable Love	—N/a	ABS-CBN	Jeepney TV
May 2	The Love Story of Kang Chi	—N/a	ABS-CBN	Jeepney TV
May 3	Naruto: Shippuden	7	ABS-CBN	Hero
May 10	Judy Abbott	—N/a	ABS-CBN (as Judy Abbott) / Q (now GMA News TV) (as My Daddy Long Legs)	Yey! (as Judy Abbott)
May 21	Digimon Savers	—N/a	ABS-CBN / Hero	Yey!
May 24	Yu-Gi-Oh! Zexal	2	ABS-CBN / Yey!	Hero
May 28	Spikers' Turf	2	PTV	S+A
May 28	Shakey's V-League	13	GMA News TV	S+A
May 28	Teenage Mutant Ninja Turtles	2	ABS-CBN	Yey!
May 29	Yu-Gi-Oh! GX	1	ABS-CBN / Hero	Yey!
June 6	Gotham	—N/a	CT	Jack TV
June 13	When a Man Falls in Love	—N/a	ABS-CBN	Jeepney TV
June 27	Naruto: Shippuden	7	ABS-CBN	Hero
July 5	The Trap Family Singers	—N/a	ABS-CBN / Q (now GMA News TV)	Yey!
July 9	Avatar: The Legend of Aang	—N/a	ABS-CBN / TV5	Yey!
July 11	Pinocchio	—N/a	GMA	GMA News TV
July 11	Top 20 Funniest	—N/a	GMA	GMA News TV
July 11	The Producers	—N/a	GMA	GMA News TV
July 12	Empress Ki	—N/a	GMA	GMA News TV
July 12	The Biggest Loser	—N/a	TGC (now defunct)	2nd Avenue
July 26	Heroman	—N/a	ABS-CBN / S+A / Hero	Yey!
July 31	MoneyWise	—N/a	CNN Philippines	GMA News TV
August 8	Future's Choice	—N/a	GMA	GMA News TV
August 8	Cebu Schools Athletic Foundation, Inc.	16	IBC	AksyonTV
August 15	King of Ambition	—N/a	GMA	GMA News TV
August 15	Angel Eyes	—N/a	ABS-CBN	Jeepney TV
August 25	National Athletic Association of Schools, Colleges and Universities	16	IBC	Basketball TV / Solar Sports
August 29	Bones	11	CT	2nd Avenue
September 4	Yu-Gi-Oh! GX	2	Hero	Yey!
September 5	Jang Geum's Dream	—N/a	GMA / Q (now GMA News TV)	Yey!
September 8	Full Throttle	—N/a	History Asia	Fox Sports
September 19	Coffee Prince	—N/a	GMA	GMA News TV
September 19	Fated to Love You	—N/a	ABS-CBN	Jeepney TV
September 20	The Voice	11	AXN	Star World
October 2	Asian Tour	—N/a	Balls (now S+A HD)	Hyper
October 8	Blood	—N/a	Cine Mo!	Jeepney TV
October 16	NCIS: Los Angeles	—N/a	S+A	Cine Mo!
October 16	Shades of Blue	—N/a	CT	2nd Avenue
October 17	Secret Garden	—N/a	GMA	GMA News TV
November 7	Care Bears: Welcome to Care-a-Lot	—N/a	9TV (now CNN Philippines)	Yey!
November 12	The Legend of Korra	—N/a	ABS-CBN	Yey!
November 28	Women in the Sun	—N/a	GMA	GMA News TV
December 10	Secret Love	—N/a	GMA	GMA News TV
December 23	Haikyu!!	2	ABS-CBN / Yey!	Hero
December 29	Samurai X	—N/a	ABS-CBN / Studio 23 (now S+A) / Q (now GMA News TV)	Hero
Unknown	ONE Championship	—N/a	IBC	S+A

=== Video streaming services ===
Date	Show	No. of seasons	Moved from	Moved to
November 26	Gilmore Girls	—N/a	Studio 23 (now S+A)	Netflix

== Milestone episodes ==
The following shows made their Milestone episodes in 2016:

Show	Network	Episode #	Episode title	Episode air date
iBilib	GMA	200th	"The 200th Episode"	January 3
Reaksyon	TV5	800th	"The 800th Episode"	January 4
Doble Kara	ABS-CBN	100th	"Manipulasyon"	January 8
Marimar (2015)	GMA	100th	"Happy Ever After"	January 8
All of Me	ABS-CBN	100th	"Taning"	January 15
Destiny Rose	GMA	100th	"Lito in Danger"	January 29
It's Showtime	ABS-CBN	2,000th	"The 2,000th Episode"	February 3
Princess in the Palace	GMA	100th	"100th Episode"	February 5
Wattpad Presents	TV5	350th	"The 350th Episode"	February 6
Eat Bulaga!	GMA	11,000th	"The 11,000th Episode"	February 9
FPJ's Ang Probinsyano	ABS-CBN	100th	"Bakbakan"	February 12
Tonight with Boy Abunda	ABS-CBN	100th	"Enrique Gil and Liza Soberano Live Interview"	February 12
New Girl	ETC on SBN	100th	"Reagan"	February 17
Wish Ko Lang!	GMA	700th	"700th Episode"	February 20
Mukha	ANC	100th	"Mangha"	February 24
The Big Bang Theory	Jack TV	200th	"The Celebration Experimentation"	February 25
Grimm	Jack TV	100th	"Into the Schwarzwald"	March 12
Doble Kara	ABS-CBN	150th	"Kiss Me"	March 18
Wowowin	GMA	100th	"100th episode"	April 15
Because of You	GMA	100th	"Kilig Surprise"	April 19
FPJ's Ang Probinsyano	ABS-CBN	150th	"Pagdiriwang"	April 26
Tonight with Boy Abunda	ABS-CBN	150th	"James Reid Interview"	April 26
Wansapanataym	ABS-CBN	300th	"That's My Boy That's My Toy (Episode 7)"	May 1
Ismol Family	GMA	100th	"Lotlot and Friends"	May 15
Bob's Burgers	Jack TV	100th	"Glued, Where's My Bob?"	May 23
Reaksyon	TV5	900th	"900th Episode"	May 26
WWE Raw	Fox	1,200th	"Money in the Bank Qualifying Match"	May 29
Doble Kara	ABS-CBN	200th	"Aso't Pusa"	June 1
Be My Lady	ABS-CBN	100th	"Paper Plane"	June 8
Ipaglaban Mo!	ABS-CBN	100th	"Bayaw"	June 11
Kapuso Mo, Jessica Soho	GMA	600th	"The 600th Episode"	June 19
Tubig at Langis	ABS-CBN	100th	"Gulo"	June 22
Healing Galing	TV5	100th	"The 100th Episode"	July 3
FPJ's Ang Probinsyano	ABS-CBN	200th	"Paglabag"	July 6
Dolce Amore	ABS-CBN	100th	"Bye Binggoy"	July 6
Tonight with Boy Abunda	ABS-CBN	200th	"Ryan Bang Interview"	July 6
The Tonight Show Starring Jimmy Fallon	CT	500th	"Michael Strahan/Parker Posey/Margo Price"	July 15
Pepito Manaloto	GMA	200th	"Pogi"	July 23
Mga Kwento ni Marc Logan	ABS-CBN	100th	"The 100th Episode"	July 30
Reaksyon	TV5	950th	"950th Episode"	August 4
Doble Kara	ABS-CBN	250th	"Duda Kay Alex"	August 11
Wansapanataym	ABS-CBN	700th	"Tikboyong (Episode 1)"	August 14
Be My Lady	ABS-CBN	150th	"Volunteers"	August 18
Pretty Little Liars	ETC on SBN	150th	"The Darkest Knight"	August 31
Tubig at Langis	ABS-CBN	150th	"Dahas"	September 1
Magandang Buhay	ABS-CBN	100th	"Maganda ang Buhay Kung Lahat ang Moments, Sini-celebrate"	September 6
FPJ's Ang Probinsyano	ABS-CBN	250th	"Sakay"	September 14
Tonight with Boy Abunda	ABS-CBN	250th	"Kathniel Interview"	September 14
Magpakailanman	GMA	200th	"Anak sa Mundo ng Droga"	September 24
Wowowin	GMA	200th	"Super October"	October 3
History with Lourd	TV5	100th	"The 100th Episode"	October 11
Reaksyon	TV5	1,000th	"The 1,000th Episode"	October 13
The Simpsons	Jack TV	600th	"Treehouse of Horror XXVII"	October 17
Doble Kara	ABS-CBN	300th	"Nagparaya"	October 20
Be My Lady	ABS-CBN	200th	"Bagong Pangarap"	October 27
Sa Piling ni Nanay	GMA Network	100th	"Karamay"	November 11
WWE SmackDown	Fox / Fox Sports 1	900th	"#SDLive900"	November 16
Magandang Buhay	ABS-CBN	150th	"One Music"	November 15
FPJ's Ang Probinsyano	ABS-CBN	300th	"Katunggali"	November 23
Tonight with Boy Abunda	ABS-CBN	300th	"Henz Villaruiz and Sitti Interview"	November 23
Arrow	2nd Avenue on RJTV 29 / Jack TV	100th	"Invasion!"	December 1
Encantadia (2016)	GMA	100th	"Kasabwat"	December 2
Kalyeserye	GMA	400th	"Binyag"	December 17
IBilib	GMA	250th	"The 250th Episodes"	December 18
Doble Kara	ABS-CBN	350th	"Lagot Kayo"	December 29

== Finales ==
=== ABS-CBN ===
The following are programs that ended on ABS-CBN:

- January 15: Ningning
- January 17: Luv U
- January 29: All of Me
- January 31: Kuroko's Basketball season 2 (rerun)
- February 7: Dance Kids
- February 12: Pangako sa 'Yo (2015)
- February 26: On the Wings of Love and Pasión de Amor (2015)
- March 4: Kapamilya, Deal or No Deal (season 5)
- March 11: And I Love You So
- March 20: Teenage Mutant Ninja Turtles (2012) season 2
- March 23: Mr. Bean: The Animated Series and You're My Home
- April 3: Celebrity Playtime
- April 8: My Love Donna
- April 15: Game ng Bayan and Kris TV
- April 23: I Love OPM
- May 22: Pilipinas Got Talent season 5
- June 16: Naruto: Shippuden season 8
- June 17: The Story of Us
- July 8: Jane the Virgin (seasons 1 and 2)
- July 15: My Super D and We Will Survive
- July 17: We Love OPM: The Celebrity Sing-Offs
- August 26: Dolce Amore
- August 28: The Voice Kids season 3
- September 2: Tubig at Langis
- September 16: Born for You
- October 16: Superbook Reimagined (seasons 1 and 2; rerun)
- October 30: Kung Fu Panda: Legends of Awesomeness season 3
- November 25: Be My Lady
- December 11: Pinoy Boyband Superstar

==== Stopped airing ====
- January 17: Kapamilya Weekend Specials (reason: Filler show for Pilipinas Got Talent season 5 on Your Face Sounds Familiar Season 2's timeslot.)
- December 16 and 19-23: ABS-CBN News and Current Affairs (replay) (Reason: pre-empted by Kapamilya Simbang Gabi 2016)
- December 31: The Bottomline with Boy Abunda (Reason: pre-empted by Usapang Bayan 2016: The ABS-CBN News 2016 Yearender and Salubong 2017: The ABS-CBN New Year Countdown)

=== GMA ===
The following are programs that ended on GMA Network:

- January 3: GMA Christmas Cartoon Festival (rerun) and Tobot
- January 8: Marimar (2015) and Pokémon the Series: XY (season 17)
- January 15: The Half Sisters and Toriko (season 2)
- January 21: Kapuso Primetime Cinema: Monday-Thursday Edition
- January 29: 24 Oras Amianan (GMA Dagupan), 24 Oras Central Visayas (GMA Cebu), Dangwa and The Producers
- February 5: Someone Like You
- February 7: Wanted: President
- February 9: Stan Lee's Superhumans
- February 10: Powerhouse and Serial Killer Earth
- February 11: Big History
- February 12: Ice Adonis
- February 13: Walang Tulugan with the Master Showman
- February 14: Hayate the Combat Butler: Can't Take My Eyes Off You
- February 19: Ring ni Kakero
- February 20: Celebrity Bluff
- February 27: Cross Fight B-Daman
- March 4: Buena Familia
- March 10: Temptation
- March 11: Destiny Rose
- March 12: The Smurfs (1981)
- March 13: Juan Tamad
- March 23: Carmina, Little Nanay and Pokémon the Series: Black & White (season 14)
- March 27: Flash Report
- April 2: Hayate the Combat Butler: Cuties
- April 3: In Touch with Dr. Charles Stanley
- April 21: Heart of Asia Presents
- April 28: You're the Best
- April 29: Dream Home, Love Hotline and That's My Amboy
- April 30: Pac-Man and the Ghostly Adventures
- May 5: Naku, Boss Ko!
- May 13: Because of You
- May 20: Wish I May
- May 21: CelebriTV
- May 28: Lip Sync Battle Philippines (season 1)
- May 31: Hi! School: Love On and Mako Mermaids (seasons 1 and 2)
- June 10: Princess in the Palace and Yo-kai Watch (season 1)
- June 12: Vampire ang Daddy Ko
- June 19: Alamat (season 2)
- June 24: Secret Hotel and The Millionaire's Wife
- July 1: I Heart You Doc
- July 15: Bleach season 6, Hanggang Makita Kang Muli and Poor Señorita
- July 20: Love Me, Heal Me
- July 22: Once Again
- August 12: Oh My Venus and Yan ang Morning!
- August 19: Pokémon: Black & White: Rival Destinies (season 15)
- August 26: Mamaw-in-Law
- August 27: Laff, Camera, Action! and Lip Sync Battle Philippines (season 2)
- September 2: Juan Happy Love Story
- September 3: Kalyeserye (Book 1)
- September 16: Descendants of the Sun and Magkaibang Mundo
- September 18: Conan, My Beautician
- September 28: The Healer
- September 30: 24 Oras Southern Mindanao (GMA Davao) and Home Foodie (season 2)
- October 21: Calle Siete and Pokémon: Black & White: Adventures in Unova (season 16)
- October 28: Sinungaling Mong Puso
- November 6: Ismol Family
- November 11: Angel's Revenge
- November 20: Magic Knight Rayearth (rerun)
- November 24: A1 Ko Sa 'Yo
- November 30: H_{2}O: Just Add Water
- December 1: Oh My Ghost
- December 2: Oh, My Mama!
- December 17: Kalyeserye (Book 2), Superstar Duets and True Horror Stories
- December 18: URL: Usapang Real Love

==== Stopped airing ====
- January 17: Wowowin (Sunday edition)
- April 29: Wowowin (Weekday edition) (reason: series break)
- May 20: Shop TV (reason: Continues to air on GMA News TV)
- August 12: Dragon Ball Z (rerun) (season break)
- December 18: Hay, Bahay! and Tsuperhero (reason: pre-empted by The Magic of Christmas: The GMA Christmas Special 2016)
- December 31: I-Witness and Magpakailanman (Reason: pre-empted by Lipad sa 2017: The Kapuso New Year Countdown)

=== TV5 ===
The following are programs that ended on TV5:

- January 15: Randy Cunningham: 9th Grade Ninja (season 1)
- January 17: Healing Galing sa TV (season 2)
- January 29: Handy Manny (rerun)
- January 30: LolaBasyang.com
- January 31: MasterChef Asia
- February 5: Scooby-Doo! Mystery Incorporated, The Looney Tunes Show and The Tom & Jerry Show
- February 7: Happy Truck ng Bayan
- February 8: Demolition Job (rerun)
- February 10: Numero (rerun)
- February 12: Bigtime (rerun)
- February 14: Cool Guys, Hot Ramen (rerun)
- February 19: Madam Chairman (rerun) and Transformers: Prime
- February 26: The Accidental Couple
- March 4: Jake and the Never Land Pirates (rerun)
- March 11: X-Men (rerun)
- March 18: Mickey Mouse Clubhouse (rerun)
- April 9: 2016 Philippine Super Liga Invitational Cup
- April 15: Fish Hooks (rerun)
- April 17: Healing Galing sa TV (season 3)
- April 22: Bakit Manipis ang Ulap?
- April 29: Hi-5 Philippines (season 2)
- April 30: T3: Alliance and Tasya Fantasya (2016)
- May 1: Happy Truck HAPPinas
- May 6: Bilang Pilipino: 2016 Premier and Reaksyon: Aplikante sa Senador
- May 7: #ParangNormal Activity
- May 12: Supernatural season 6
- May 13: Amachan
- May 27: Kidlat (rerun), Lilo & Stitch: The Series, Rat-A-Tat, Star Wars: The Clone Wars and The Sylvester & Tweety Mysteries
- May 28: Star Wars Rebels
- May 29: Born to Be a Star (season 1), Doc McStuffins (season 1), Higglytown Heroes and Stitch! (rerun)
- June 2: Ang Panday (2016)
- June 11: Asia's Next Top Model (cycle 4)
- June 12: Barangay Utakan
- June 21: Insider (rerun)
- June 23: Once Upon a Time season 1
- June 27: Supernatural season 7
- July 2: Wattpad Presents: TV Movies
- July 18: Smallville season 1
- July 28: Vikings season 1
- July 31: Healing Galing sa TV (season 4)
- August 1: World's Deadliest Animals
- August 17: 2016 Philippine Super Liga All-Filipino Conference
- August 22: Supernatural season 8
- August 26: Jimmy Two-Shoes and The Jungle Bunch to the Rescue
- August 27: Duck Dodgers, Taz-Mania and What's New, Scooby-Doo?
- September 8: Aksyon Bisaya (TV5 Channel 21 Cebu) and Aksyon Dabaw (TV5 Channel 2 Davao)
- September 9: Sheriff Callie's Wild West
- September 12: Once Upon a Time season 2
- September 16: Ancient X-Files
- September 18: Hacking the System
- September 26: Smallville season 2
- September 30: HAPPinas Happy Hour, Little Einsteins and Sofia the First (season 2)
- October 8: Krypto the Superdog
- October 13: Once Upon a Time season 3
- December 10: 2016 Philippine Super Liga Grand Prix Conference
- December 30: Rat-A-Tat (rerun)
- December 31: Family Matters

==== Stopped airing ====
- January 22: Wattpad Presents (Weekdays edition)
- May 28: Taz-Mania and What's New, Scooby-Doo? (reason: Short break)
- May 29: Duck Dodgers and Krypto the Superdog (reason: Short break)
- June 4: Outcast (reason: Continues to air on Fox)
- August 5–21: Little Einsteins, Sheriff Callie's Wild West and Sofia the First (season 2) (reason: Pre-empted by 2016 Summer Olympics)
- September 15: Shark Men (reason: Short break)
- September 16: Randy Cunningham: 9th Grade Ninja (season 2)
- September 17: Krypto the Superdog and The Powerpuff Girls (1998; rerun) (reason: Short break)
- September 18: Penn Zero: Part-Time Hero, The 7D and Wander Over Yonder (reason: Short break)

=== PTV ===
The following are programs that ended on People's Television Network:

- January 14: Personage
- February 7: Halo Halo House
- April 1: Here Comes Mr. Oh
- May 6: Hatol ng Bayan Electoral Primer
- June 24: Report Kay Boss
- July 8: Good Morning Boss, News @ 1, News @ 6 and NewsLife
- July 9: News @ 6 Saturday Edition
- July 10: Ating Alamin and The Weekend News (2nd incarnation)
- September 2: O Shopping
- September 16: Business and Beyond

==== Stopped airing ====
- December 30: PTV Sports (reason: dissolved, became a 5-minute segment of PTV News)
- December 31: Panahon.TV (reason: creation of PTV InfoWeather segment during PTV News; continues to air on Pilipinas HD on BEAM TV)

=== IBC ===
The following are programs that ended on IBC:

- June 24: Report Kay Boss
- September 4: Kawaii International

=== Minor networks ===
The following are programs that ended on minor networks:

- February 8: Justice on Air on UNTV Life
- February 9: Kaagapay on UNTV Life
- February 10: Frontliners on UNTV Life
- February 11: Law Profile on UNTV Life
- February 12: Mapalad Ang Bumabasa and My OFW Story on UNTV Life
- February 13: Bayanihan and Tinig ng Marino on UNTV Life
- March 20: UNTV Cup (season 4) on UNTV Life
- March 28: Klima ng Pagbabago on Net 25
- July 3: MTRCB Uncut on Net 25
- July 10: ASOP By Request, Cook it Right and Klasrum on UNTV Life
- July 11: A Day in the Life of on UNTV Life
- July 12: Bread N' Butter on UNTV Life
- July 13: Legally Yours and Sports 37 on UNTV Life
- July 14: Easy Lang Yan! and Istorya on UNTV Life
- July 15: Manibela, Mapalad Ang Bumabasa, Polwatch, UNTV News, Hataw Balita Newsbreak and Wish 1075 TV on UNTV Life
- August 28: Tiny Kitchen on Light Network

==== Unknown dates ====
- Alerto Central Luzon, Ang Saya-Saya, Arangkada Balita, Clark in Focus, Dito Po Sa Amin, Kapampangan Animation and Live-Action Productions, Klaro Panalo, Loneky Pangets, Pera Pera Lang, Sandigang Legal, Shafe and Like, So to Speak, Tagis Lakas, TeleVShop Powered by: ZIQ and The Noel Jusay Lacsamana Show on CLTV 36
- Ignite Gospel Music Festival (season 4) on Light TV
- Convergence and In Case of Emergency on Net 25

=== Other channels ===
- January 1: A Bryk at a Time on 2nd Avenue
- January 1: Habang Kapiling Ka on Fox Filipino
- January 1: Eyeshield 21 (season 1; rerun) on Hero
- January 2: Guns and Roses on Jeepney TV
- January 3: Ina, Kasusuklaman Ba Kita? on Fox Filipino
- January 6: Yowamushi Pedal on Hero
- January 7: Faking It season 1 and Project Runway: Under the Gunn on ETC
- January 8: Pilipinas, Game Ka Na Ba? on Jeepney TV
- January 10: Tears to Tiara on Yey!
- January 11: Halfworlds (season 1) on HBO Asia
- January 12: Chaika: The Coffin Princess: Avenging Battle on Hero
- January 12: Angelito: Batang Ama on Jeepney TV
- January 15: Abyss of Passion and Rubí (2004) on Telenovela Channel
- January 17: Digimon Adventure 02 on Yey!
- January 19: Kuroko's Basketball season 3 on Hero
- January 21: Mula sa Puso (1997) on Jeepney TV
- January 22: Heroes Reborn on Jack TV
- January 23: American Horror Story: Hotel on Jack TV
- January 24: In Her Shoes (season 1) on 2nd Avenue
- January 26: The Mentalist season 6 on CT
- January 26: NCAA Season 91 Men's Volleyball tournaments on S+A
- January 28: NCAA Season 91 Women's Volleyball tournaments on S+A
- January 30: White Collar (season 5) on Fox TV Philippines
- January 31: Hiding on CT
- February 2: Legal Help Desk on CNN Philippines
- February 3: Inside Business with Coco Alcuaz on ANC
- February 3: Date A Live season 2 on Hero
- February 4: Dayaw (season 1) on ANC
- February 4: Finding Carter (season 1) on ETC
- February 5: Ikaw Sana on Fox Filipino
- February 5: The Heirs on Jeepney TV
- February 8: Ikaw ang Lahat sa Akin on Jeepney TV
- February 9: Haikyu!! season 1 (rerun) and Hitman Reborn! season 3 (rerun) on Hero
- February 12: CNN Philippines Headline News and CNN Philippines Nightly News on CNN Philippines
- February 12: Mundo Mo'y Akin on Fox Filipino
- February 12: Agimat: Ang Mga Alamat ni Ramon Revilla: Tonyong Bayawak (rerun) on Jeepney TV
- February 15: NCIS season 11 on CT
- February 18: May Minamahal (rerun) on Jeepney TV
- February 19: Starman on Jeepney TV
- February 20: Repeat After Me on 2nd Avenue
- February 21: Precious Hearts Romances Presents: Bud Brothers on Jeepney TV
- February 22: Major (season 1) on Yey!
- February 23: Magic Kaito 1412 on Hero
- February 24: Kuroko's Basketball season 1 (rerun) on Hero
- February 24: Spirits on Jeepney TV
- February 26: Valiant Love on Telenovela Channel
- February 27: Digimon Adventure (rerun) on Hero
- February 27: Dance Kids on Yey!
- February 28: Numbers season 6 on Fox TV Philippines
- February 29: Digimon Adventure 02 (rerun) on Hero
- March 3: Suits season 5 on Jack TV
- March 4: Ao Haru Ride on Hero
- March 5: Telenovela on 2nd Avenue
- March 6: My Hero Nation (season 6) and Power Rangers Samurai (rerun) on Hero
- March 6: You're the Worst (season 1) on Jack TV
- March 6: Pinoy Big Brother Revisited: Celebrity Edition season 1 on Jeepney TV
- March 7: Naruto: Shippuden season 6 (rerun) on Hero
- March 8: The Mysteries of Laura (season 2) on 2nd Avenue
- March 8: Space Brothers on Hero
- March 8: Power Rangers Samurai on Yey!
- March 11: Ang TV (Year 3) on Jeepney TV
- March 11: Dwarfina on Fox Filipino
- March 16: Pretty Little Liars season 6 on ETC
- March 16: Princess and I on Jeepney TV
- March 16: Peter Pan and Wendy on Yey!
- March 18: Pasión de Amor on Cine Mo!
- March 19: Digimon Tamers on Yey!
- March 26: Cilla on 2nd Avenue
- March 26: Class 3-C Has a Secret on Sari-Sari Channel
- March 28: Agenda on CNN Philippines
- March 29: Major (season 2) on Yey!
- March 30: Anthony Bourdain: No Reservations (season 8) on 2nd Avenue
- March 31: Kuroko's Basketball season 2 (rerun) on Hero
- April 1: Shades of Blue (season 1) on CT
- April 1: Muli on Fox Filipino
- April 1: A Promise of a Thousand Days and Maging Sino Ka Man (2006; rerun) on Jeepney TV
- April 1: Barrio Kulimlim on Sari-Sari Channel
- April 2: El Tigre: The Adventures of Manny Rivera on Yey!
- April 3: Ang Munting Paraiso on Jeepney TV
- April 4: Gourmet Girl Graffiti on Hero
- April 6: Life in Pieces (season 1) on 2nd Avenue
- April 6: American Crime Story season 1 on CT
- April 8: American Idol: The Farewell Season on ETC
- April 8: Food Wars!: Shokugeki no Soma on Hero
- April 8: The Flying House on Yey!
- April 9: 2016 Philippine Super Liga Invitational Cup on AksyonTV and Hyper
- April 9: Psych season 8 on CT
- April 10: Voltron Force on Yey!
- April 14: 2016 PBA D-League Aspirants' Cup on AksyonTV and Hyper
- April 18: Cooper Barrett's Guide to Surviving Life on Jack TV
- April 19: Supergirl season 1 on ETC and Jack TV
- April 22: Tayong Dalawa on Jeepney TV
- April 22: Power Rangers Mystic Force on Yey!
- April 23: Yu-Gi-Oh! 5D's season 2 on Yey!
- April 26: iZombie (season 2) on ETC
- April 26: Lucifer (season 1) on Jack TV
- April 27: UAAP Season 78 Men's volleyball tournament on S+A
- April 28: State of Affairs on 2nd Avenue
- April 29: My Girlfriend Is a Gumiho on Jeepney TV
- April 29: Clipped on Jack TV
- April 30: UAAP Season 78 Women's volleyball tournament on S+A
- May 1: CSI: Crime Scene Investigation season 13 on Cine Mo!
- May 3: The Mentalist season 7 on CT
- May 4: My Bride Is a Mermaid on Hero
- May 4: Kokey (rerun) on Jeepney TV
- May 4: Major (season 3) on Yey!
- May 6: PAW Patrol season 1 on Yey!
- May 9: Si Mary at Ang Lihim na Hardin on Yey!
- May 9: Elementary (season 4) on CT
- May 11: The Grinder on CT
- May 12: Yuki Yuna Is a Hero on Hero
- May 13: Amaya on Fox Filipino
- May 13: The Big Bang Theory season 9 on Jack TV
- May 14: Damien on Jack TV
- May 14: Smallville season 7 and Veronica Mars season 3 on Fox TV Philippines
- May 14: The Vampire Diaries season 7 on ETC
- May 15: Bones season 9 on Fox TV Philippines
- May 15: Digimon Frontier on Yey!
- May 16: American Dad! season 12 and The Last Man on Earth (season 2) on Jack TV
- May 17: Habang May Buhay (2010) on Jeepney TV
- May 18: New Girl season 5 on ETC
- May 18: Komiks: Da Adventures of Pedro Penduko on Jeepney TV
- May 19: Empire season 2 and Survivor: Kaôh Rōng on Jack TV
- May 21: The Originals season 3 on ETC
- May 21: Grimm season 5 and The 100 (season 3) on Jack TV
- May 21: Angel season 4, Cold Case season 4, Fringe season 1, Gossip Girl season 2, House season 5, The Mentalist season 2 and Without a Trace season 5 on Fox TV Philippines
- May 22: 24 season 7, 90210 season 2, Buffy the Vampire Slayer season 7, Ghost Whisperer season 5, Terminator: The Sarah Connor Chronicles (season 1) and The Unit season 4 on Fox TV Philippines
- May 23: Yu-Gi-Oh! Zexal season 1 (rerun) on Hero
- May 23: Bob's Burgers season 6, Family Guy season 15 and The Simpsons season 27 on Jack TV
- May 25: Modern Family season 7 on 2nd Avenue
- May 25: The Voice season 10 on AXN Asia
- May 25: The Flash season 2 on ETC and Jack TV
- May 26: Rosewood (season 1) on CT
- May 26: Arrow season 4 on Jack TV
- May 26: My Little Juan on Yey!
- May 27: Got to Believe on Jeepney TV
- May 28: Yu-Gi-Oh! 5D's season 3 on Yey!
- May 29: The Middle season 7 on 2nd Avenue
- May 30: 2 Broke Girls season 5 on ETC
- May 31: Blue Dragon (season 1) on Yey!
- June 1: Asia's Next Top Model (cycle 4) on Star World
- June 3: Maalaala Mo Kaya, Next Level Na, Game Ka Na Ba? and Unforgettable Love on Jeepney TV
- June 3: Ultraman Mebius on Yey!
- June 6: The Fruit of Grisaia and Your Lie in April on Hero
- June 6: Rubi (rerun) on Jeepney TV
- June 6: Super Inggo at ang Super Tropa on Yey!
- June 9: The Americans season 4 on CT
- June 9: Little Battlers Experience and Major (season 4) on Yey!
- June 9: Digimon Savers (rerun) on Hero
- June 10: Goin' Bulilit Classics (Year 3) and The Love Story of Kang Chi on Jeepney TV
- June 10: T.U.F.F. Puppy (season 2) on Yey!
- June 12: Undercover Boss (season 5) on CNN Philippines
- June 13: Cooper Barrett's Guide to Surviving Life on Jack TV
- June 14: Aksyon Solusyon on AksyonTV
- June 14: The Legal Wife on Jeepney TV
- June 16: Alagang Kapatid sa Radyo5 on AksyonTV
- June 17: Bitag Live!, Healthline and Punto Asintado on AksyonTV
- June 17: Legacy on Fox Filipino
- June 17: The Lady from Vendaval on Telenovela Channel
- June 18: Magbago Tayo and Metro Sabado on AksyonTV
- June 19: Healing Galing (Sunday edition) and Perfect Morning on AksyonTV
- June 20: Project Runway season 13 on ETC
- June 20: Power Rangers Megaforce on Yey!
- June 24: Reign season 3 on ETC
- June 24: Naruto: Shippuden season 7 (rerun) on Hero
- June 25: Z Nation (season 2) on Jack TV
- June 26: Funny Ka, Pare Ko (season 1) on Cine Mo!
- June 27: Game of Thrones season 6 on HBO Asia
- July 1: Jamie's 15-Minute Meals and The Layover (season 1) on 2nd Avenue
- July 1: Real Talk (season 2) on CNN Philippines
- July 1: Crown of Tears on Telenovela Channel
- July 2: Teenage Mutant Ninja Turtles (2012) season 2 on Yey!
- July 3: Blood on Cine Mo!
- July 4: Judy Abbott on Yey!
- July 7: Project Runway: Junior (season 1) on ETC
- July 8: Yamada and the Seven Witches on Hero
- July 9: One Day Isang Araw (rerun) on GMA News TV
- July 9: Digimon Savers on Yey!
- July 10: Pinoy Abroad (rerun) on GMA News TV
- July 12: Best Bars in America (season 2) on CT
- July 13: Komiks and Metal Fight Beyblade: Baku on Yey!
- July 14: Ellen's Design Challenge (season 2) on 2nd Avenue
- July 14: Major (season 5) on Yey!
- July 15: When a Man Falls in Love on Jeepney TV
- July 17: Kuroko's Basketball (season 2) on Yey!
- July 18: 2016 Shakey's V-League Open Conference on S+A
- July 20: Sanjay and Craig on Yey!
- July 21: Framework on 2nd Avenue
- July 22: Bones season 11 on CT
- July 22: My Husband's Lover on Fox Filipino
- July 22: Brooklyn Nine-Nine season 3 on Jack TV
- July 26: Komiks Presents: Kapitan Boom on Yey!
- July 29: Louie season 5 on Jack TV
- July 29: Myx Daily Top 10 on Myx
- July 31: Odd Mom Out (season 1) on 2nd Avenue
- August 1: Law & Order: Special Victims Unit season 14 on CT
- August 2: Komiks Presents: Varga on Yey!
- August 4: Italy Unpacked (season 1) on 2nd Avenue
- August 4: Minsan Lang Kita Iibigin (rerun) on Jeepney TV
- August 5: Pinocchio on GMA News TV
- August 6: Dishkarte of the Day on GMA News TV
- August 6: !Oka Tokat (rerun) and Wansapanataym Classics on Jeepney TV
- August 7: Mr. Bean: The Animated Series on Yey!
- August 8: The Biggest Loser USA season 11: Couples 4 on 2nd Avenue
- August 10: Fantasista Doll on Hero
- August 12: The Producers on GMA News TV
- August 12: Honesto on Jeepney TV
- August 13: Extant (season 1) on 2nd Avenue
- August 14: Warehouse 13 season 2 on CT
- August 14: Kings of Restoration and Pawn Stars on GMA News TV
- August 15: Buddy Complex on Hero
- August 15: Komiks Presents: Flash Bomba and Power Rangers Wild Force on Yey!
- August 16: Faking It season 2 on ETC
- August 17: 2016 Philippine Super Liga All-Filipino Conference on AksyonTV and Hyper
- August 18: Major (season 6) on Yey!
- August 19: Pahiram ng Sandali on Fox Filipino
- August 19: Oreca Battle on Hero
- August 21: Free! on Yey!
- August 22: Komiks Presents: Tiny Tony on Yey!
- August 24: Containment on CT
- August 25: Italy Unpacked (season 2) and The Biggest Loser USA season 12: Battle of the Ages on 2nd Avenue
- August 26: The Millionaire Matchmaker (season 8) on ETC
- August 28: I Live with Models on Jack TV
- August 29: The Trap Family Singers on Yey!
- August 30: My Binondo Girl (rerun) on Jeepney TV
- August 31: Web Therapy season 4 on 2nd Avenue
- August 31: Yowamushi Pedal (rerun) on Hero
- September 1: Yu-Gi-Oh! Zexal season 2 on Hero
- September 1: Z Rangers on Yey!
- September 2: Future's Choice on GMA News TV
- September 2: Star-Myu: High School Star Musical on Hero
- September 2: Sex & Drugs & Rock & Roll (season 2) on Jack TV
- September 2: Maging Sino Ka Man: Ang Pagbabalik on Jeepney TV
- September 2: Fanboy & Chum Chum and Pleasant Goat and Big Big Wolf on Yey!
- September 3: Yu-Gi-Oh! GX season 1 on Yey!
- September 4: Tiny Kitchen on GMA News TV
- September 6: Naruto: Shippuden season 8 on Hero
- September 8: Tyrant (season 3) on CT
- September 9: Top Chef Duels on 2nd Avenue
- September 9: Goin' Bulilit Classics (Year 4) on Jeepney TV
- September 10: The Voice Kids season 3 on Yey!
- September 11: Heartbeat on 2nd Avenue
- September 11: You're All Surrounded on Cine Mo!
- September 11: University Town (season 1) on S+A
- September 13: Himouto! Umaru-chan on Hero
- September 14: Apoy sa Dagat on Jeepney TV
- September 14: 2016 Shakey's V-League Collegiate Conference on S+A
- September 15: Italy Unpacked (season 3) on 2nd Avenue
- September 15: Finding Carter (season 2) on ETC
- September 15: Baywatch (seasons 5 and 6) on Jeepney TV
- September 16: Beauty & the Beast season 4 on ETC
- September 16: Angel Eyes on Jeepney TV
- September 16: King of Ambition on GMA News TV
- September 18: You're the Worst (season 2) on Jack TV
- September 22: Digimon Tamers (rerun) on Yey!
- September 23: Indio on Fox Filipino
- September 23: Heroman on Yey!
- September 24: Back to the Movies and Pieta on Jeepney TV
- September 25: Funny Ka, Pare Ko (season 2) on Cine Mo!
- September 30: Top 20 Funniest on GMA News TV
- September 30: Inazuma Eleven season 1 (rerun) on Hero
- September 30: Timeless Love on Telenovela Channel
- October 2: Precious Hearts Romances Presents: Kristine on Jeepney TV
- October 3: Project Runway All Stars season 4 on ETC
- October 5: Power Rangers Ninja Storm on Yey!
- October 6: Komiks: Da Adventures of Pedro Penduko on Yey!
- October 7: First Up Philippines on Bloomberg TV Philippines
- October 8: Bates Motel season 4 on Jack TV
- October 8: Free!: Eternal Summer on Yey!
- October 10: Rectify (season 2) on CT
- October 10: Active Raid (season 1) on Hero
- October 11: Satisfaction (season 2) on 2nd Avenue
- October 11: NCAA Season 92 Men's Basketball tournaments on S+A
- October 13: Palibhasa Lalake on Jeepney TV
- October 14: Top Chef season 13 on 2nd Avenue
- October 14: Coffee Prince (2007) on GMA News TV
- October 14: Juan dela Cruz and Meteor Garden (2001; rerun) on Jeepney TV
- October 16: Wansapanataym presents: My App #Boyfie on Jeepney TV
- October 19: The Magicians (season 1) on ETC
- October 19: CSI: Crime Scene Investigation season 1 on Fox TV Philippines
- October 20: Grimgar of Fantasy and Ash on Hero
- October 21: Adarna on Fox Filipino
- October 21: Fated to Love You (Korean version) on Jeepney TV
- October 21: America's Next Top Model: All Stars on Lifestyle
- October 24: Yamada and the Seven Witches (rerun) on Hero
- October 25: Gulong ng Palad (2006) on Jeepney TV
- October 27: #NoFilter on ANC
- October 28: Dragon Collection on Hero
- October 29: MasterChef U.S. season 7 on Lifestyle
- October 30: Married (season 2) on 2nd Avenue
- November 4: Kuroko's Basketball (season 2; rerun) on Hero
- November 4: Ni Hao, Kai-Lan, Peppa Pig and The Penguins of Madagascar on Yey!
- November 5: Avatar: The Legend of Aang on Yey!
- November 9: Komiks: Nasaan Ka Maruja? on Jeepney TV
- November 9: Jang Geum's Dream on Yey!
- November 10: Jane the Virgin season 1 on Jeepney TV
- November 11: Free! (seasons 1 and 2; rerun) on Hero
- November 11: Komiks: Pedro Penduko at ang Mga Engkantao on Yey!
- November 13: Blade Man on Cine Mo!
- November 14: 2016 Shakey's V-League Reinforced Open Conference on S+A
- November 15: Wakfu on Yey!
- November 18: Mga Mata ni Anghelita on Fox Filipino
- November 19: American Horror Story: Roanoke on Jack TV
- November 21: CSI: Crime Scene Investigation season 2 on Fox TV Philippines
- November 22: Angelito: Ang Bagong Yugto on Jeepney TV
- November 23: Madam Secretary season 2 on 2nd Avenue
- November 24: The Eden of Grisaia on Hero
- November 25: Secret Garden on GMA News TV
- November 26: Yu-Gi-Oh! GX season 2 on Yey!
- November 27: Selfie (rerun) on ETC
- December 1: Haikyu!! (season 1; rerun) on Hero
- December 1: Digimon Frontier (rerun) on Yey!
- December 2: Princess Hours (rerun) on Jeepney TV
- December 3: Tripped on Jack TV
- December 5: Westworld on HBO
- December 5: Naruto on Yey!
- December 6: The Mindy Project (season 4) on 2nd Avenue
- December 6: Brave New Girls on ETC
- December 7: Two Wives (2014) on Jeepney TV
- December 7: UAAP Season 79 Men's and Women's basketball tournaments on S+A
- December 8: Chasing Maria Menounos on ETC
- December 9: Are You the One? season 1 and Pitch (season 1) on ETC
- December 10: 2016 Philippine Super Liga Grand Prix Conference on AksyonTV and Hyper
- December 10: Blood on Jeepney TV
- December 12: Divorce on HBO
- December 14: The Voice season 11 on Star World
- December 15: The Amazing Race Asia season 5 on AXN Asia
- December 15: Survivor: Millennials vs. Gen X on Jack TV
- December 16: Paano Ba ang Mangarap? on Fox Filipino
- December 18: The Biggest Loser USA season 13: No Excuses on 2nd Avenue
- December 18: Covert Affairs (season 1) on Fox TV Philippines
- December 19: Shades of Blue (season 1) on 2nd Avenue
- December 20: People of Earth (season 1) on Jack TV
- December 21: Scream Queens season 2 on ETC
- December 22: CSI: Crime Scene Investigation season 3 on Fox TV Philippines
- December 22: Food Wars!: Shokugeki no Soma – Second Plate on Hero
- December 23: The Layover (season 2) on 2nd Avenue
- December 24: Blood, Sweat & Heels (season 1) on ETC
- December 25: Orange Marmalade on Cine Mo!
- December 25: Four Weddings (season 1) on ETC
- December 26: Bitten (season 1) on ETC
- December 28: Gintama': Enchōsen (rerun) on Hero
- December 28: Muling Buksan ang Puso on Jeepney TV
- December 30: Aksyon Ngayon on DZMM TeleRadyo
- December 30: O Shopping and Women in the Sun on GMA News TV
- December 30: Give Love on Christmas and Lovers in Paris (rerun) on Jeepney TV
- December 30: Newsline Philippines on SMNI News Channel

==== Stopped airing ====
- February 19: Palibhasa Lalake on Jeepney TV (reason: Short break)
- April 2: Pieta on Jeepney TV (reason: Short break)
- July 10: Diyos at Bayan (Sunday replay) on GMA News TV
- December 4: Pinoy Meets World (rerun) on GMA News TV
- December 31: Shop TV on AksyonTV

==== Unknown ====
- Ignite Gospel Music Festival (season 4) on GMA News TV

=== Video streaming services ===
- September 15: WWE Cruiserweight Classic on WWE Network
- September 22: Mr. Robot (season 2) on Iflix
- December 12: Ash vs Evil Dead (season 2) on HOOQ

==== Stopped airing ====
- March 1: O Shopping, Shop Japan: Oaklawn Home Shopping and TV Shop Philippines on BEAM TV (reason: Relocated as digital-only subchannels)

== Networks ==
The following are a list of free-to-air and cable channels or networks launches and closures in 2016.

=== Launches ===
Date	Station	Channel	Source
January 1	Gametime TV	Cignal Channel 97	
January 1	ABS-CBN Sports + Action HD	Sky Cable and Destiny Cable Channel 166 (Metro Manila) and Channel 701 (Provincial); Sky Direct Channel 24 (Nationwide)	
January 1	Celestial Movies Pinoy	Cignal Channel 12	
January 4	8TriMedia Television	Cablelink Channel 7	
January 15	Sari-Sari Channel	Cignal Channel 3	
March 9	Kapamilya Box Office	ABS-CBN TV Plus Channel 7 Sky Cable and Destiny Cable Channel 158 (Metro Manila) and Channel 24 (Provincial); Sky Direct Channel 43 (Nationwide)	
March 15	ANC HD	Sky Cable and Destiny Cable Channel 182 (Metro Manila) and Channel 706 (Provincial)	
April 5	Zee Sine	Cablelink Channel 24 (Metro Manila)	
April 25	Bilang Pilipino Channel	Cignal Channel 18 (SD) / Channel 198 (HD)	
May 9	Inquirer 990 Television	Channel 32 (DTT)	
May 11	Island Living Channel	Channel 32 (DTT)	
May 11	GCTV	Channel 32 (DTT)	
May 24	SMNI News Channel	Channel 40 (DTT)	
June 12	Pilipinas HD	Cablelink and Sky Cable Channel 18 and 33	
June 12	SLTV (Sabong)	Cignal Channel 95	
June 16	Mensahe TV	Cignal Channel 89	
June 20	DXDD Radio-Television	Fil Products Ozamiz Channel 18	
July 5	PBA Rush	Cignal Channel 52 (SD) / Channel 129 (HD)	
July 22	Sony GEM	Parasat Cable TV Channel 79	
August 1	ABS-CBN Regional Channel	Sky Cable and Destiny Cable Channel 4 (Metro Manila); Sky Direct Channel 14 (Nationwide)	
October 19	Tag	Sky Cable Channel 77 (Metro Manila); Sky Direct Channel 44 (Nationwide)	
October 30	Life TV (PMCC 4th Watch)	Cignal Channel 44	
October	HITS	Cignal Channel 120 (HD)	
December 9	Kids Nation Channel (KNC)	Channel 38 (DTT)	
Unknown	DreamWorks Channel Asia	Various channel listings	

=== Rebranded ===
The following is a list of television stations or cable channels that have made or will make noteworthy network rebrands in 2013.

Date	Rebranded from	Rebranded to	Channel	Source
May	All Sports Network	Sports Illustrated TV	Sky Cable Channel 83 (SD) / Channel 177 (HD)	
June 3	Channel M	tvN (2nd incarnation)	Cablelink Channel 222; Cignal Channel 81; Sky Cable and Destiny Cable Channel 145 (SD) / Channel 191 (HD)	
August	beIN Sports 3 Premier League	beIN Sports 3	Sky Cable Channel 206 (HD)	

=== Closures ===
Date	Station	Channel	Sign-on debut	Source
May 15	Bilang Pilipino Channel	Cignal Channel 18 (SD) / Channel 198 (HD)	April 25, 2016	
December 31	MTV Pinoy	Cablelink Channel 7 Cignal Channel 151; Sky Cable and Destiny Cable Channel 71	February 14, 2014	

== Awards ==
- February:
  - 2016 Adamson University Media Awards, organized by Adamson University (awarded to Mike Enriquez)
  - 2016 EVSU Student Choice Mass Media Awards, organized by Eastern Visayas State University
- February 3: The Platinum Stallion Media Awards 2016, organized by the Trinity University of Asia
- February 19: 3rd Gawad Bagani sa Kommunikasyon, organized by University of the East-Caloocan
- February 22: 2015 Anak TV Seal Awards, organized by Anak TV Foundation
- March 8: 2016 Hildegarde Awards for Women in Media and Communication, organized by St. Scholastica's College
- March 10: 3rd UmalohokJuan Awards, organized by Lyceum of the Philippines
- March 12: 2016 Paragala Central Luzon Media Awards, organized by Holy Angel University
- March 19: Gandingan 2016, organized by College of Development Communication, UP Los Baños
- April 8: 2016 Gawad Tanglaw Awards, organized by the University of Perpetual Help System Dalta Las Piñas
- April 17: 2016 GMMSF Box-Office Entertainment Awards, organized by Memorial Scholarship Foundation
- April 21: 12th USTV Awards, organized by the University of Santo Tomas
- April 29: 24th KBP Golden Dove Awards, organized by the Kapisanan ng mga Broadkaster ng Pilipinas
- June 30: 2016 Rotary Club of Manila Journalism Awards, organized by the Rotary Club of Manila
- August 29: 2016 VACC Awards, organized by the Volunteers Against Crime and Corruption, held at Malacañang Palace
- September: 11th COMGUILD Media Awards, organized by the COMGUILD Center for Journalism
- September 10: 6th Edukcircle Awards, organized by the International Education Circle ICCS
- September 29: 2nd ALTA Media Icon Awards, organized by the University of Perpetual Help System DALTA
- October 12: 38th Catholic Mass Media Awards, organized by the CMMA Foundation
- October 23: 30th PMPC Star Awards for Television, organized by the Philippine Movie Press Club
- December 2: 2016 PUP Mabini Media Awards, organized by the Polytechnic University of the Philippines
- December 10:
  - 2016 Anak TV Seal Awards, organized by Anak TV Foundation
  - 3rd Indieng-Indie Short Film Festival

== Births ==
- March 26: Sienna Stevens, actress and commercial model
- July 16: Chastity Claire Dizon, actress and commercial model
- September 8: Sebreenika Santos, actress and commercial model

== Deaths ==
January

- January 6 – Marnill "Kigoy" Abarico, reality show contestant (Pinoy Big Brother: Unlimited) (b. 1979)
- January 8 – German Moreno, TV host, actor, prominent starbuilder (b. 1933)
- January 9 – Cielito del Mundo, original host of Kapwa Ko Mahal Ko and Mahal, actress (b. 1935)
- January 24 – Ad Roel Alcober, station manager of ABS CBN Cagayan de Oro, ABS CBN Tacloban, Former Substitute anchor of TV Patrol Southern Mindanao (b. 1956)
- January 29 – Sabatini Fernandez, original co-host of Kung Kami ang Tatanungin, actor (b. 1930)

February

- February 3 – Yda Yaneza, actress
- February 4 – Rosauro "Uro" Q. Dela Cruz, director, Bubble Gang (b. 1951)
- February 20 – Noel Perfecto, PTV-4 senior correspondent (b. 1947)
- February 29 – Wenn V. Deramas, writer, film and TV director of ABS-CBN soap opera programs. (b. 1966)

March

- March 6 – Francis Pasion, independent film and TV director, On the Wings of Love (b. 1978)
- March 11 – Antonio Cabangon Chua, Nine Media Corporation/Aliw Broadcasting Corporation chairman (b. 1934)
- March 16 – Ben Aniceto, former vice president and general manager, ABS-CBN (1986–87) (b. 1933)

April

- April 14 – Rod Reyes, former vice president and general manager, GMA Radio Television Arts (b. 1935)

August

- August 20 – Lilia Cuntapay, actress (b. 1935)

September

- September 10 – Joy Viado, comedian (b. 1959)
- September 29 – Miriam Defensor Santiago, Senate of the Philippines (b. 1945)

October

- October 11 – Dick Israel, actor (b. 1947)

November

- November 21 – Blakdyak, singer, actor, comedian (b. 1969)

December

- December 18 – Bobby Guanzon, Filipino journalist and politician, cardiac arrest (b. 1948)
- December 30 – Cristy Dailo, broadcast journalist of FBS Radio Network (1973–1991), PTV-4 (1981–1995), DWIZ 882 (1991–2016) and RJTV-29 (1995–2007), ovarian cancer (b. 1951)

== See also ==
- 2016 in television
