= Yoshie Hayasaka =

Japanese actress and singer (born 1975)

Yoshie Hayasaka 早坂 好恵
- Born: 脇田 好江 (Wakita Yoshie); 25 September 1975 (age 50); Naha, Okinawa, Japan
- Genres: Japanese pop
- Occupations: Actress; singer
- Instrument: Vocals
- Years active: 1990–present

Yoshie Hayasaka (早坂 好恵, Hayasaka Yoshie; born 25 September 1975 in Naha, Okinawa) is a Japanese actress and singer. Along with the ranking in the top 100 in the Oricon Singles Chart for several of her songs, her single "Zettai! Part 2" reached number 42. In 2003, she married the Japanese pro wrestler known as Super Delfin.

== Discography ==
- "Zettai! Part 2" (1990) Ranma ½ opening theme

== Films ==
- Buta no Mukui (1999)
- Izure no Mori ka Aoki Umi (2004)

== TV programs ==
- Waratte Iitomo! (1991–1992)
- Anime Himitsu no Hanazono (sings the opening and closing music)
