= The Layover (TV series) =

American travel and food television show

- Created by: Zero Point Zero Production Inc.
- Starring: Anthony Bourdain (host)
- Country of origin: United States
- No. of episodes: 20

Production
- Running time: domestic: one hour (approx. 0:42 per episode); international: approx. 0:48 per episode

Original release
- Network: Travel Channel
- Release: November 21, 2011 – February 4, 2013

The Layover is a travel and food show on the Travel Channel hosted by Anthony Bourdain. The show premiered on November 21, 2011 in an episode based on Singapore. The format and the content of the show are based on what a traveler can do, eat, visit and enjoy within 24 to 48 hours in a city. Each episode starts with the host landing at the city, with the clock starting the countdown until the time that he will leave the city. As a seasoned traveler, he meets up with locals and explores the city in and out, within matters of hours, both the touristy way and the local way.

On February 15, 2012, Travel Channel renewed the show for the 2012/2013 season, selecting November 19, 2012 for the second-season premiere; featured cities for the season include Atlanta, Chicago, Dublin, New Orleans, Paris, Philadelphia, São Paulo, Seattle, Toronto, and Taipei.

== Episodes ==
=== Season 1 (2011–12) ===
No.	Location	Original release date
1	Singapore	November 21, 2011
2	New York City	November 28, 2011
3	Rome	December 5, 2011
4	Miami	December 12, 2011
5	Hong Kong	December 19, 2011
6	Montreal	December 26, 2011
7	Amsterdam	January 2, 2012
8	San Francisco	January 9, 2012
9	London	January 16, 2012
10	Los Angeles	January 23, 2012

=== Season 2 (2012–13) ===
No.	Location	Original release date
11	Chicago	November 19, 2012
12	Paris	November 26, 2012
13	Philadelphia	December 3, 2012
14	São Paulo	December 10, 2012
15	Toronto	December 17, 2012
16	Dublin	January 7, 2013
17	Atlanta	January 14, 2013
18	Taipei	January 21, 2013
19	New Orleans	January 28, 2013
20	Seattle	February 4, 2013
