= Four Weddings (Australian TV series) =

- Four Weddings opening title card
- Narrated by: Fifi Box
- Country of origin: Australia
- Original language: English
- No. of series: 2
- No. of episodes: 13

Production
- Running time: Approx 48 minutes per episode
- Production company: Granada Media Australia

Original release
- Network: Seven Network
- Release: 8 September – 5 October 2010

Related
- Four Weddings UK

Four Weddings is an Australian programme, based on the UK version of the same name. The series is narrated by Fifi Box and produced by Granada Media Australia for the Seven Network.

The first season follows a similar style as Come Dine with Me Australia and involves four brides attending each other's weddings and rating them on their Dress, Ceremony, Food and Reception out of thirty marks. The second season features an altered format, with the guest brides rating the other weddings out of ten marks for the whole event.

At the end of each episode they discover which of the couples has won a luxury honeymoon. First series couples won their honeymoon from the company Elegant Resorts & Villas, whilst second series winners won their honeymoon from company Coral Seas.

== Episode guide ==
=== Series 1 ===
==== Episode 1 ====
Aired: 8 September 2010				Scores				
Rank	Candidate	Theme	Budget	Dress	Ceremony	Food	Reception	Total
1	Sothy	East Meets West	$40,000	18	18	21	16	73
2	Chez	Black & White Extravaganza	$20,000	16	22	16	12	66
3	Allana	Fairytale	$80,000	12	16	21	15	64
4	Tracey	Historical Re-enactment	$20,000	15	13	14	16	58

==== Episode 2 ====
Aired: 15 September 2010				Scores				
Rank	Candidate	Theme	Budget	Dress	Ceremony	Food	Reception	Total
1	Chani	Lunch at the Pub	$5,000	15	18	17	16	66
2	Tammy	All Aussie	$30,000	17	16	16	15	64
3	Catherine	Keeping it Simple	$10,000	18	14	15	16	63
4	Ngarie	Gold Coast Spectacular	$80,000	12	12	8	11	43

==== Episode 3 ====
Aired: 21 September 2010				Scores				
Rank	Candidate	Theme	Budget	Dress	Ceremony	Food	Reception	Total
1	Kayla	Hollywood	$50,000	21	15	22	24	82
2	Jessica	Destination	$25,000	14	18	22	17	71
3	Kathryn	Bollywood	$30,000	19	12	16	16	63
4	Nicole	Pagan	$20,000	17	5	12	9	43

==== Episode 4 ====
Aired: 28 September 2010				Scores				
Rank	Candidate	Theme	Budget	Dress	Ceremony	Food	Reception	Total
1	Marlena	Beach Escape	$20,000	24	18	15	20	77
2	Diana	Do It Yourself	$10,000	19	19	19	20	77
3	Heather	Low Key	$20,000	17	17	20	22	76
4	Lucy	Bush Elegance	$25,000	12	19	14	14	59

==== Episode 5 ====
Aired: 5 October 2010				Scores				
Rank	Candidate	Theme	Budget	Dress	Ceremony	Food	Reception	Total
1	Stephanie	Fairytale	$40,000	22	16	13	21	72
2	Yvette	Old School Elegance	$30,000	15	16	20	17	68
3	Kerry	1920's Mobster	$20,000	10	13	17	16	56
4	Alice	No Frills	$8,000	13	17	6	9	45

== Ratings ==
=== Series 1 ===
Episode	Date Aired	Timeslot	Rating	Nightly Rank	Weekly Rank
1.01	8 September 2010	Wednesday 7:40pm	1,012,000	13	33
1.02	15 September 2010	Wednesday 7:40pm	1,100,000	10	28
1.03	21 September 2010	Tuesday 7:30pm	1,054,000	9	31
1.04	28 September 2010	Tuesday 7:30pm	1,023,000	7	31
1.05	5 October 2010	Tuesday 7:30pm	1,109,000	5	13
