= Anime Himitsu no Hanazono =

Japanese anime television series

- Screenshot of Mary Lennox in the anime.

アニメ ひみつの花園
- Genre: Drama; Historical
- Anime television series
- Directed by: Tameo Kohanawa
- Produced by: Yasuo Kaneko; Masako Matsuura
- Written by: Kaoru Umeno
- Music by: Kohei Tanaka
- Studio: Aubec, Gakken, NHK Enterprises
- Original network: NHK Educational TV
- Original run: 19 April 1991 – 27 March 1992
- Episodes: 39

Anime Himitsu no Hanazono (アニメ ひみつの花園) is an anime television series aired in Japan from 1991 to 1992. It is an adaptation of the 1911 novel The Secret Garden by Frances Hodgson Burnett.

== Cast ==
Major:

- Mary Lennox (Japanese: Miina Tominaga)
- Dickon Sowerby (Japanese: Mayumi Tanaka)
- Colin Craven (Japanese: Minami Takayama)
- Ben Weatherstaff (Japanese: Yoichi Miyagawa)
- Archibald Craven (Japanese: Osamu Saka)
- Helen McCoy (Japanese: Masako Katsuki)
- Martha Phoebe Sowerby (Japanese: Chika Sakamoto)
- Mr. Pitcher (Japanese: Fumihiko Tachiki)
- Narrator (Japanese: Tomoko Munakata)
- Sarah Ann Medlock (Japanese: Yoshiko Ōta)
- Susan Sowerby (Japanese: Kazuyo Aoki)

Other:

- Bunny (Japanese: Yoshiko Kamei)
- Camilla (Japanese: Fumi Hirano)
- Hawkins (Japanese: Akio Ohtsuka)
- Dr. Henry Craven (Japanese: Rokuro Naya)
- Jim (Japanese: Urara Takano)
- Nurse Natalie (Japanese: Midori Nakasawa)
- Patty (Japanese: Minami Takayama)
- Sam (Japanese: Masamichi Sato)

== Music ==
Yoshie Hayasaka sings both:

- Opening Gyakuten Typhoon (逆転タイフーン)
- Ending Hara horo hire hare (はらほろひれはれ)

== Titles in other languages ==
- Arabic: الحديقة السرية ("The Secret Garden")
- Chinese: 神秘花園 (Taiwan), 神秘的花園 (Hong Kong, Macau, Guangdong and Guangxi)
- Italian: Mary e il giardino dei misteri ("Mary and The Garden of Mysteries")
- Korean: 비밀의 화원 ("The Secret Garden")
- Polish: Tajemniczy ogród ("The Secret Garden")
- Portuguese: O Jardim Mágico ("The Magic Garden") (Italian-dubbed version with Portuguese subtitles)
- Spanish: El jardín secreto ("The Secret Garden") (Mexico, Chile and Spain only; the latter country has a dubbed version that was based on the Italian version)
- Tagalog: Si Mary at Ang Lihim na Hardin/Si Maria at Ang Lihim na Hardin ("Mary and The Secret Garden")
- Romanian: Grădina ascunsă ("The hidden garden")
- Greek: Ο Μυστικός Κήπος ("The Secret Garden")
