= Four Weddings =

British reality television weddings competition

- Also known as: Party Wars (2010)
- Genre: Reality
- Created by: Elliot Johnson; Amanda Wilson; Danny Carvalho; Jonny Coller; Peter Faherty
- Voices of: Steve 'Sparky' Parker (series 1-3); Adil Ray (series 4)
- Country of origin: United Kingdom
- Original language: English
- No. of series: 4 (Four Weddings); 1 (Party Wars)
- No. of episodes: 54 (Four Weddings); 9 (Party Wars)

Production
- Running time: 60 min (inc. adverts)
- Production companies: ITV Studios (2009–11); Potato (2013)

Original release
- Network: Sky Living
- Release: 6 July 2009 – 19 September 2013

Four Weddings is a British reality television series that premiered on Sky Living, on 6 July 2009. It has become popular enough to have inspired the creations of versions in other countries. One episode included the real-life wedding of Steps member Faye Tozer to her second husband Michael Smith.

The show ran for four series, running from 2009-2013. A planned revival series that was to be produced by ITV Studios subsidiary Multistory Media for Channel 4 was planned for 2023, but it was scrapped in May of that year for undisclosed reasons.

== Format ==
The programme follows a similar style to Come Dine with Me, and involves four brides, or four grooms, attending one another's weddings and rating them on:

- Dress (out of 10)
- Venue (out of 10)
- Food (out of 10)
- Overall experience (out of 10)

At the end of the show, the four brides or grooms discover which of the couples has won a luxury honeymoon. Viewers could also play online in the "Online wedding rater" and rate the weddings as they were shown for comparison with the rest of the public.

== Transmissions ==
=== Four Weddings ===
Series	Start date	End date	Episodes
1	6 July 2009	7 September 2009	10
2	29 March 2010	28 June 2010	13
3	9 November 2010	7 June 2011	18
4	27 June 2013	19 September 2013	13

=== Party Wars ===
Series	Start date	End date	Episodes	Notes
Pilot	17 May 2010		1	as Four 21st Birthday Parties
1	18 October 2010	6 December 2010	8	

== Ratings ==
Episode viewing figures from BARB.

=== Four Weddings, Series 1 ===
Episode No.	Airdate	Total Viewers	Living Weekly Ranking
1	6 July 2009	412,000	1
2	13 July 2009	342,000	3
3	20 July 2009		
4	27 July 2009	373,000	2
5	3 August 2009	443,000	1
6	10 August 2009	374,000	2
7	17 August 2009	372,000	2
8	24 August 2009	431,000	2
9	31 August 2009	395,000	2
10	7 September 2009	523,000	1

=== Four Weddings, Series 2 ===
Episode No.	Airdate	Total Viewers	Living Weekly Ranking
1	29 March 2010	357,000	6
2	5 April 2010	391,000	4
3	12 April 2010	458,000	4
4	19 April 2010	412,000	5
5	26 April 2010	366,000	6
6	3 May 2010	478,000	1
7	10 May 2010	378,000	3
8	24 May 2010	273,000	5
9	31 May 2010	329,000	6
10	7 June 2010	345,000	5
11	14 June 2010	391,000	1
12	21 June 2010	399,000	2
13	28 June 2010	525,000	1

=== Party Wars ===
Episode No.	Airdate	Total Viewers	Living Weekly Ranking
Pilot	17 May 2010	189,000	6
1	18 October 2010	203,000	9
2	25 October 2010	Under 162,000	Outside Top 10
3	1 November 2010	Under 135,000	Outside Top 10
4	8 November 2010	Under 169,000	Outside Top 10
5	15 November 2010	201,000	7
6	22 November 2010	Under 133,000	Outside Top 10
7	29 November 2010	Under 114,000	Outside Top 10
8	6 December 2010	137,000	7

=== Four Weddings, Series 3 ===
Episode No.	Airdate	Total Viewers	(Sky) Living Weekly Ranking
1	9 November 2010	185,000	8
2	16 November 2010	163,000	10
3	23 November 2010	155,000	7
4	30 November 2010	120,000	8
5	7 December 2010	177,000	5
6	14 December 2010	245,000	4
7	21 December 2010	163,000	4
8	28 March 2011	Under 188,000	Outside Top 10
9	4 April 2011	300,000	6
10	11 April 2011	246,000	6
11	18 April 2011	187,000	10
12	25 April 2011	204,000	7
13	2 May 2011	269,000	6
14	9 May 2011	161,000	10
15	16 May 2011	Under 180,000	Outside Top 10
16	23 May 2011	174,000	9
17	30 May 2011	Under 161,000	Outside Top 10
18	7 June 2011	Under 181,000	Outside Top 10

=== Four Weddings, Series 4 ===
Episode No.	Airdate	Total Viewers	Sky Living Weekly
1	27 June 2013	144,000	5
2	4 July 2013	Under 112,000	Outside Top 10
3	11 July 2013	123,000	7
4	18 July 2013	118,000	8
5	25 July 2013	196,000	5
6	1 August 2013	170,000	6
7	8 August 2013	179,000	5
8	15 August 2013	154,000	6
9	22 August 2013	118,000	10
10	29 August 2013	147,000	7
11	5 September 2013	122,000	8
12	12 September 2013	136,000	8
13	19 September 2013	153,000	5

== International versions ==
The show's format has been exported to the following countries:

Region/Country	Local title	Network	Premiere Year/s
Australia	Four Weddings	Seven Network	2010
Canada	Four Weddings	Slice Network	2012
Czech Republic	4 Svatby	TV Nova	2012
Finland	Neljät häät	Nelonen	2011
France	4 Mariages pour 1 Lune de Miel	TF1 (2011–20); TFX (2022–present)	2011
Germany	4 Hochzeiten und eine Traumreise	VOX	2012
Israel	4 חתונות	Channel 2 (Reshet)	2015
Israel	4 חתונות	Kan 11	2025
Italy	Matrimoni all'italiana	Rete 4	2011
Italy	Quattro matrimoni in Italia; Quattro matrimoni	Fox Life; Sky Uno; TV8 (reruns)	2014
Poland	Cztery wesela	Polsat	2020
Romania	4 nunţi şi o provocare	Pro TV	2013
Russia	Четыре свадьбы	REN TV; Friday!	2014, 2018
Spain	Cuatro Weddings	Cuatro	2018
Ukraine	4 Весiлля	1+1	2011
Ukraine	4 Весiлля	ТЕТ	2018
United States	Four Weddings	TLC	2010

- Note:
  - The American and French versions of the series features no input from the grooms, with only the brides able to give out any ratings for each ceremony. In the French version, one of the groom is able to give ratings only when it's a gay couple that participates.
  - In the French version, since 2019, Élodie Villemus, a wedding planner, is there to observe and give ratings. Her ratings count for half of the final score.
