= Hapi ang Buhay =

Philippine television sitcom

- Genre: Situational comedy
- Created by: Net 25; INCinema Productions
- Written by: Carlo Jay Ortega Cuevas; Stephanie Mayo; Denis Bustamante
- Directed by: Carlo Jay Ortega Cuevas
- Starring: Various
- No. of seasons: 2
- No. of episodes: 11

Production
- Camera setup: Multi-camera setup
- Running time: 45 min. (w/o commercials)

Original release
- Network: Net 25
- Release: March 5 – December 10, 2016

Hapi ang Buhay (lit. "life is happy") is a Philippine television sitcom. It is the first sitcom to be produced by Net 25 of the Eagle Broadcasting Corporation, in cooperation with INCinema Productions.

Hapi ang Buhay is the sequel-spinoff of Walang Take Two, which was nominated at the 2016 International Filmmaker Festival of World Cinema for Best Comedy. The first season premiered on March 6, 2016. The second season launched on December 10, 2016.

The sitcom is directed by Carlo Jay Ortega Cuevas, who won Best Director of a Foreign Feature Film at the 2016 Filmmaker Festival of World Cinema in London for Walang Take Two.

== Plot ==
The sitcom is a stark illustration of an urban community, where the main characters deal with relevant social issues. The sitcom has no main protagonist but rather focuses on various characters and their present dilemma.

Part of the sitcom's mainstay cast are the lead characters from Walang Take Two, including the titular Hapi (John Stevenson Tabangay), an aspiring filmmaker, Onyok (Edward Rudolph Flores), his level-headed ally, and the overconfident Caloy (Erbil Escano).

The Indian loan shark, Alfajor (Wilson Tapalla), the mischievous Oblax (Dennis Garcia), and the vain and narcissistic Dondon (Genesis Gomez) also join the regular cast.

== Cast ==
- John Stevenson Tabangay as Hapi
- Edward Flores as Onyok
- Erbil Escaño Jr. as Caloy
- Wilson Tapalla as Alfajor
- Dennis Rey Garcia as Oneil "Oblax" Balingit Laxamana
- Genesis Gomez as Dondon
- Kimberly Anne Cordero as Cherry
- Luz Cortez as Luz
- Teresita Yco as Tess
- Darlo Cordero as Jerry
- Norman Perez as Chess Player
- Marc Aldrin Familiara as Chess Player
- Xandrix Rodaje as Xantrix
- Jacque Gacita as Jack
- Recelle Perez as Aling Susan
- Mia Suarez as Esther / Estella
- Joyce Gabion as Rowena
- Virgilio Reyes as Mang Julian
- Althea Guanzon as Thea
