= Takeshi Yamamoto =

Fictional character in the Reborn! manga and anime series

- Reborn! character
- Takeshi Yamamoto by Akira Amano
- First appearance: Manga chapter 5 Anime episode 1
- Voiced by: Suguru Inoue (Japanese)
- Affiliation: Vongola Family

Takeshi Yamamoto (Japanese: 山本 武, Hepburn: Yamamoto Takeshi) is a fictional character in the Reborn! manga and anime series created by Akira Amano. Portrayed as one of the protagonist's first friends, Takeshi Yamamoto is introduced as a 14-year-old starting pitcher for his school's baseball team. Apart from the manga and anime, Yamamoto has also appeared in other media from the Reborn! franchise including video games.

Yamamoto's character has been well received by readers since his introduction, ranking as one of the most popular characters in every official Shonen Jump poll of the series. Publications for manga, anime and other media have commented on his character. Merchandise based on his appearance has also been released including key chains and action figures.

== Character outline ==
=== Personality ===
Rarely seen angry, Yamamoto has a warm and friendly personality and is a peacemaker between his comrades. He is popular among his classmates, especially girls. In the manga he is portrayed as loving to play baseball, to the point of attempting suicide when he is unable to play. Because of baseball, Yamamoto focuses on protecting his energy and his body in baseball and battle. However, as the series progresses, he decides not to focus on protecting his body so he can protect his friends and family using all of his strength. He does not like to lose and is ridden with guilt and regret upon defeat.

Yamamoto remains calm during life-or-death struggles. In addition, he is a fast learner and understands a situation better than anyone. This leads Reborn to claim he is a "born hitman". However, Yamamoto is oblivious to the fact that he and his friends are mafioso, believing that they are playing a mafia game and that Reborn's weapons are just toys made with advanced technology. He is also optimistic to the point of naïvetè; although many of the opponents he meets during the series attempt to kill him, Yamamoto searches for a way to defeat them without mortal injury, such as using the back of his blade or not dealing a killing blow, and attempts to save his opponents as they are about to die. Even after accepting his role as Tsuna's Rain Guardian and the Vongola's swordsman, he continues to balance his life between baseball and swordsmanship, only devoting himself to swordsmanship when he needs to protect his friends.

=== Weapons and abilities ===
Due to his baseball training, Yamamoto possesses a strong body and the best reflexes and stamina of all the Vongola, giving him a natural advantage. He is ranked as the second strongest (after Hibari Kyoya) Namimori student by the young statistician, Futa. Reborn also said that among all the guardians, he has one of the highest chances of being a great hitman. Also characters like Hibari have been shown to have interest in Yamamoto's battles, and Squalo has also shown to have interest in his development to the point of willingly tutoring him. He is able to dodge bullets shot at close-range and from a far distance. Yamamoto originally uses a bat that he received from Reborn. When swung over 300 kilometres per hour (190 mph), the bat changes into a katana. After training under his father, Yamamoto receives "Shigure Kintoki" (時雨金時, Shower in Late Autumn, Golden Moment), a shinai that changes into a katana while using the "Shigure Soen Ryu" (時雨蒼燕流, Shigure Sōen Ryu; lit. 'Shower in Late Autumn, Blue Swallow Style'). His training in the series' alternate future allows him to create an affinity between the Shigure Kintoki and his Rain Flame, something his adult self could not accomplish, due to the irregular nature of the blade, a high concentration of Rain flames from the Vongola Ring were needed to create that affinity. Yamamoto then learns to fuse his swallow box weapon, called "Kojirō" (小次郎) or the "Rondine di Pioggia" (Italian: Swallow of the Rain), with the Shigure Kintoki. This, along with the three short swords his Akita Inu Vongola box weapon "Jirō" (次郎) carries on its back, creates the quadruple irregular blade "Asari Ugetsu" (朝利雨月). The three short swords can be used for aerial combat, ranged attacks, flying or propulsion. Kojirō is also capable of creating heavy rainfall.

Yamamoto utilizes the Shigure Soen Ryu (style) he learned from his father. Because the style will be passed on to only the worthy students, the forms are taught once and the student is expected to memorize. The students are then able to create a form in addition to those they learned, signifying the student's true worthiness to succeed the style. Because of the nature of the Shigure Soen Ryu, weaker branches deteriorate and other branches disappear because there is no worthy successor. This leads Yamamoto to believe the style is flawless and invincible. Yamamoto was taught eight forms: four defensive and four offensive. He then creates another three: two offensive, the first being used in his fight against Squalo. The technique he created is called "Duplicate Rain". The other, involves using his Kojirō box weapon to create a strong current of rain flames and water, later called "Scontro di Rondine" (Clash of the Swallow in Italian), and one that combines all the forms. He also uses Squalo's attack "Attacco di Squalo" (Italian: Attack of the Shark), which causes a moment of paralysis after a strong sword swing. When combined with a Rain Flame's attribute of tranquility, the attack causes full body paralysis. He later gains the Vongola Gear Rain Necklace, which in its Cambio Form gives him two swords, utilising his both his box weapons to create a 12th Shigure Soen Ryu technique designed to counter illusions.

== Appearances ==
=== In Reborn! ===
Adult Yamamoto as depicted in the future

Shortly after his introduction, Yamamoto breaks his arm during baseball practice. Because he can no longer play baseball, he is driven to commit suicide. However, he is stopped by Tsuna. He is subsequently recruited into the Vongola Mafia family by Reborn, but he believes Reborn is playing a game. After Mukuro Rokudo and his subordinates begin attacking Namimori Middle School students, Yamamoto accompanies Tsuna to defeat Mukuro, but is defeated during a battle with Mukuro's stand-in Lancia.

Later, Yamamoto is defeated by the Varia Superbi Squalo who tries to steal the Vongola Rings. Yamamoto is then named the holder of the Rain Ring, signifying his role as Tsuna's Rain Guardian, and thus battles Squalo again in the Vongola Tournament. To avoid another defeat, he trains under his father and learns the Shigure Soen Ryu. He becomes the official successor of the style after defeating Squalo with a new form of his own.

After Tsuna and Hayato Gokudera are transported to the story's alternate future (nearly ten years later), they are taken to the Vongola's secret hideout by an adult Yamamoto. However, the adult Yamamoto is soon replaced by his younger self. After he is defeated by Gamma, a commander of the rival Millefiore Mafia family, and is saved by an adult Kyoya Hibari, Yamamoto undergoes training with Reborn, after which he creates two new Sigure Soen Ryu forms and learns the secrets of the Arcobaleno. After Yamamoto is defeated by Genkishi during the attack on a Millefiore base, an older Squalo returns from Italy to train Yamamoto and convince him to devote himself to swordsmanship. He is chosen to be one of the combatants in the Choice game, easily defeating a disguised Genkishi and failing to defeat the target in time to win the game. After the Vongola escape from the Millefiore, they are attacked shortly after, and Squalo fights one of the Six Funeral Wreaths in order to give the Vongola enough time to flee. Yamamoto leaves the group to help Squalo, and he later rejoins the Vongola to assist them in the fight against the Funeral Wreaths.

After defeating Byakuran and returning to the past, the guardians are soon told of Tsuna's inheritance ceremony and are introduced to the Shimon family. Whilst initially getting along with Shimon member Kaoru Mizuno, he was grievously injured by Kaoru, who thought that Yamamoto had discovered the Shimon Family's secret. However, he is seemingly visited by Byakuran and mysteriously manages to recover just in time to assist Tsuna and the others fight against Daemon Spade on Shimon Island.

=== In other media ===
Besides his appearance in the original manga series and its anime adaptation, Yamamoto has appeared in other Reborn! works, including all of the series' video games. He also appears as a supportive character in two crossover video games which feature Tsuna and Reborn fighting against several characters from other manga, including Jump Super Stars and Jump Ultimate Stars.

On January 23, 2008, Pony Canyon released a character CD entitled "Our Joy!" (俺達のJOY!, Oretachi no Joy!), which features both Yamamoto and Gokudera. It contains duets and individual songs sung by both voice actors: Suguru Inoue and Hidekazu Ichinose.

== Reception ==
Yamamoto has been popular with the Reborn! reader base, having ranked as the third most popular character in the first official Shonen Jump poll of the series, losing to Hayato and Tsuna, who took first and second respectively. He ranked as the sixth most popular hero in the second poll of the series, which was divided into heroes and villains. In the third poll of the series, Yamamoto ranked as the fifth most popular male character. Yamamoto then placed in both popularity polls the fourth time around, which was divided into current characters, where he placed eighth, and as characters who fans would most like to see in their future forms, where he placed twentieth.

In a review of volume one, Yamamoto was viewed by manganews.com to be just as "crazy" as Reborn, Gokudera or Lambo. However, manga-sanctuary.com saw his rivalry with Gokudera and his belief that the mafia is a game as repetitious. Manganews.com also notes that the limited use of the Dying Will Bullet in the fifth volume allows the author to develop Yamamoto's character and that the introduction of antagonists in the eighth volume proves he is "worthy" to be a shōnen manga character. The training of Tsuna's companions in the tenth volume is praised because Yamamoto is able to adopt a specific fighting style. In review of volume 12, he is noted to have "class and charisma" he did not have in previous volumes. However, he is still perceived to be naïve in the following volume. Despite this, Yamamoto's fight with Squalo was noted to be "monumental" by Emmanuel Bahu-Leyser of animeland.com.
