= Chrome Dokuro =

Fictional character from Japanese manga series 'Reborn!'

- Reborn! character
- Chrome Dokuro by Akira Amano
- First appearance: Manga chapter 113; Anime episode 50
- Voiced by: Satomi Akesaka
- Affiliation: Kokuyo Gang; Vongola Family

Chrome Dokuro (Japanese: クローム 髑髏, Hepburn: Kurōmu Dokuro) is a fictional character in the Reborn! manga and anime series created by Akira Amano. Apart from the manga and anime, Chrome has also appeared in other media from the Reborn! franchise including video games, Drama CDs, and light novels.

== Character outline ==
=== Personality ===
Chrome is a nice and kind girl. She is very loyal to people she holds dear, especially Mukuro, whom she loves, and is willing to put her life on the line for them. However, she's too shy and timid to the point she runs away from any sign of kindness given by others, particularly from Kyoko, Haru, and I-Pin, as she never thought that she would ever be accepted by anyone unconditionally. This was caused by her once lonely life when she's unable to make any friend and the cold treatments that she received from both her parents. Despite her desire to protect her friends, she lacked self-confidence and quick to look down on her own power whenever she failed. However, as the story progressed, she became more open to her friends and eventually resolves to become stronger and independent to protect those she holds dear, finally able to stand up for herself with her own power.

=== Weapons and abilities ===
She use the same trident used by Mukuro as her main weapon that can be reconstructed if it breaks. If hers or Mukuro's trident was destroyed, her illusionary organs would fail. Since she and Mukuro share a single body, Chrome has been shown to be able to use two of Mukuro's Six Paths of Reincarnation: creating illusions and summoning animals. In the future, she receives the Mist Vongola Box, which enables her to use Daemon Spade's Devil Lens that can see through any illusions. However, after Mukuro was set free, she is unable to use his power and equipment since Mukuro takes it along with him. She thus creates her own trident, one with a singular spike instead of two. Both Mukuro and Mammon acknowledge her talent and potential as both illusionist and warrior as only an expert can be able to see through her illusions. She eventually become strong enough to create her own organs.

== Appearances ==
=== In Reborn! ===
Chrome was originally a girl named Nagi (凪) who lived a lonely life with no friends and neglected by her mother and step-father. One day, she saved a cat in a traffic accident, causing her to lose most of her organs and her right eye. When her parents visited her in the hospital, she overheard their conversation which tells that her mother refused to sacrifice her organs to save her and none of them wish for her to live longer than she already has. Having enough with her sad life, Nagi was ready to die, until she heard Mukuro's voice that told her it won't end. Realising her potential as illusionist, Mukuro saved her life by creating illusionary organs and invited her to join him, which she agreed.

She later appears with Ken and Chikusa during the battle against Varia, introducing herself as Tsuna's Mist Guardian. At the beginning of the battle, she fought in par against Mammon, but quickly defeated by him once he unleashed the power of his pacifier. Mukuro immediately replaced her and defeat Mammon, winning the mist ring battle. During the Sky match, she is taken as hostage by Belphegor and Mammon so Yamamoto and Gokudera will give the rest of the Vongola Rings. They are later saved by Ryohei and defends Tsuna when the Varia are disqualified from the match and declared as the winners.

In the story's alternate future, Millefiore member Glo Xinia approaches Chrome who had been transported into the future by the Ten-Year Bazooka. She was immediately cornered by him until the future Mukuro had possessed Glo's owl helps Chrome defeat him in battle. While spying on the Millefiore Family, Mukuro engages Byakuran in battle but is severely wounded, causing Chrome's organs to disappear and nearly die. Fortunately, future Hibari instructed her to use her Vongola Ring to recreate her organs. Afterwards she is given the Mist Vongola Box Weapon, the Daemon Spade's Devil Lens, which allows her to see through enemy's illusions.

A month after Tsuna's group returns to the past, she was stalked by one of Simon Guardians, Julie Kato. During the inheritance ceremony, she was kidnapped by Julie and held captive in Simon Island. During her captive, Julie reveals himself to be the first Vongola Mist Guardian, Daemon Spade, who wishes to use her to gain Mukuro's body. When she refused to help him, Daemon controls her mind, making her obey. At the last day of Simon Rings' awakening, Daemon undid his mind control of her and remove the illusionary organs to lure Mukuro into possessing her, which he succeeded. During the final battle, she help Enma by creating a barrier around them with Mukuro's support to protect them from Tsuna's XX Burner to defeat Daemon. After Daemon was defeated, she returned to Namimori with the others.

Several weeks after the battle with Daemon, Chrome is kicked out by Mukuro from the gang and transferred to Tsuna's class. During the first day of the Representative Battle of the Rainbow, she is visited by Mukuro via his illusions to check on her condition, who then reveals she's going to die within three days, much to her shock. The next day, she's not present at school and is taken to hospital when Kyoko visited her, finding her organs disappears. She pleads to Tsuna to let her join his team, but Tsuna declines out of concern for her health. During the third day of Representative Battle of the Rainbow, the cause of her declining health is revealed because she's rejecting Mukuro's illusionary organs as she wants him to see her as an individual, yet at the same time a part of her still wished to live with his illusion. After finding her resolve, she joins Reborn's team as his representative and helps them defeat two of three Vindices by combining her illusions with Mukuro's. On the final day of the battle, she participates in the battle against Big Pino and Small Gia alongside Yamamoto, Gokudera, and Fran to buy some times for Tsuna, Enma, and Basil to defeat the Vindice one by one.

=== In other media ===
Besides her appearance in the original manga series and its anime adaptation, Chrome has appeared in other Reborn! works, including all of the series' video games. Chrome also appears in the second light novel, Secret Bullet 2: X-Fiamma, where the events of how Chrome met Ken and Chikusa are revealed. She then appears again in Secret Bullet: The Funeral Wreaths Wither. She also appears in two Drama CDs; "Chrome Saw It! Happy Days at Kokuyo Land" and "Guardians' Banquet". On March 4, 2009, she released her first character CD, "Setsuna no Kioku", and on December 16, 2009, she released her second character CD, "Namida no Ondo".

== Reception ==
Chrome has been popular with the Reborn! reader base, having ranked as the most popular female character in the third official Shonen Jump poll of the series Chrome then placed in both popularity polls the fourth time around, which was divided into current characters, where she placed twelfth, and as characters who fans would most like to see in their future forms, where she placed fifth. In the fifth poll, she ranked as the twelfth most popular overall character. And Chrome vs Mukuro placed 12th in poll that determines which battle between two characters that fans wishes to see the most. In the sixth poll, she is ranked tenth most popular character, but then turned to eleventh in the seventh poll. The Japanese music distributor Recochoku has made two annual survey of which anime characters that people would like to marry. In the first and second year, Chrome ranked tenth and seventh in the category "The Character I Want to Be My Bride." Manga News praised Chrome's character development in volume 40, commenting that she and Mukuro are the heart of the volume. Also, her teamwork with Mukuro in the battle against Vindice in the same volume is commented to be rather "tactical but still spectacular." The author of Reborn! light novel series, Hideaki Koyasu, states that Chrome is his favorite character.
