= Tsuna (disambiguation) =

== People ==
- Watanabe no Tsuna, a Japanese samurai

== Fictional characters ==
- Tsunayoshi "Tsuna" Sawada, a character from the anime/manga Reborn! (Katekyo Hitman Reborn!)
