= Masanori Ikeda =

Japanese actor and seiyū (born 1966)

- 池田 政典
- Born: December 1, 1966 (age 58); Kyoto, Japan
- Occupation(s): Voice actor, actor, singer
- Notable work: Rurouni Kenshin as Shishio Makoto
- Website: http://kmcinema.com/actors/post-60.html

Masanori Ikeda (池田 政典, Ikeda Masanori; born December 1, 1966) is a Japanese actor, singer, and voice actor. He is best known for playing Shishio Makoto in the anime Rurouni Kenshin.

== Filmography ==
=== Television animation ===
1980s

- Kimagure Orange Road (1987) – "Night of Summer Side" (opening theme)

1990s

- Battle Spirits Ryuuko no Ken (1993) – Robert Garcia
- Mehyō Sakunetsu no Sniper (1996)
- Rurouni Kenshin (1996) – Shishio Makoto

2000s

- Atto Homu (2000) – Takashi Ōkubo
- Yu-Gi-Oh! Duel Monsters (2000) – Narrator
- The Prince of Tennis (2001) – Yūdai Yamato
- Nanba Kinyū-den Minami no Teiō V-Cinema 34: "Brand no Jūatsu" (2006)
- Reborn! (2006) – Xanxus

2010s

- Kaseifu no Mita (2011) – Isao Minakawa
- Black Angels 2 (2012)
- Black Angels 3 (2012)

=== Theatrical animation ===
- Yu-Gi-Oh! Duel Monsters: Pyramid of Light (2004) – Narrator
- Rurouni Kenshin – Shin Kyoto-Hen: Zenpen Homura no Ori (2011) – Shishio Makoto
- Rurouni Kenshin – Shin Kyoto-hen: Hikari no Saezuri (2012) – Shishio Makoto

=== Video games ===
- Katekyō Hitman Reborn! DS Flame Rumble Kaien Ring Soudatsusen! (2007) - Xanxus
- Katekyō Hitman Reborn! DS Flame Rumble Hyper - Moeyo Mirai (2008) - Xanxus
- Katekyō Hitman Reborn! DS Fate of Heat Honō no Sadame (2008) - Xanxus
- Katekyō Hitman Reborn! Battle Arena (2008) - Xanxus
- Katekyō Hitman Reborn! Dream Hyper Battle! (2008) - Xanxus
- Katekyō Hitman Reborn! Kindan no Yami no Delta (2008) - Xanxus
- katekyo hitman REBORN! DS Flame Rumble X - Mirai Chou-Bakuhatsu!! (2009) - Xanxus
- Katekyō Hitman Reborn! Fate of Heat II - Unmei no Futari (2009) - Xanxus
- Katekyō Hitman Reborn! Battle Arena 2 - Spirits Burst (2009) - Xanxus
- Katekyō Hitman Reborn! DS Ore ga Boss! Saikyō Family Taisen (2009) - Xanxus
- Katekyō Hitman Reborn! DS Flame Rumble XX - Kessen! Real 6 Chouka (2010) - Xanxus
- Katekyo Hitman Reborn! Kizuna no Tagbattle (2010) - Xanxus
- J-Stars Victory VS (2014) – Shishio Makoto
- Jump Force (2019) – Shishio Makoto

=== Tokusatsu ===
- Kamen Rider Wizard (2012) – Oikawa
