= Mukuro Rokudo =

Fictional character from Reborn! manga

- Reborn! character
- Mukuro Rokudo by Akira Amano
- First appearance: Manga chapter 63; Anime episode 20
- Voiced by: Toshinobu Iida
- Affiliation: Kokuyo Gang; Vongola Family

Mukuro Rokudo (Japanese: 六道 骸, Hepburn: Rokudō Mukuro) is a fictional character in the Reborn! manga and anime series created by Akira Amano. Portrayed as the series' first primary antagonist, Mukuro Rokudo is introduced as a 15-year-old Mafia criminal who is the leader of the Kokuyo Gang, which consists of heinous criminals who have recently escaped from prison. However, later on in the series, after possessing the body of Chrome Dokuro, he takes on a more supportive role for the series' main characters, becoming somewhat of an ally rather than an enemy, though he prefers to not want to associate with them. Apart from the manga and anime, Mukuro has also appeared in other media from the Reborn! franchise including video games and novels.

Mukuro's character has been well received by readers since his introduction, ranking as one of the most popular characters in every official Shonen Jump poll of the series. Also, his and Kyoya Hibari's character CD entitled "Sakura addiction", peaked at seventh place on the Oricon charts. Their performance earned each of their voice actors a Seiyu Awards' nomination for "Best Musical Performance", in addition to Toshinobu Iida being nominated as the "Best Rookie Actor" for his portrayal as Mukuro Rokudo. Numerous anime and manga publications have commented on Mukuro's character, mostly receiving positive reviews. Merchandise based on his appearance has also been released including key chains and action figures.

== Character outline ==
=== Personality ===
Mukuro is often seen with a playful smile and seems apathetic to the suffering of others. Appearing as the series' first antagonist, Mukuro is not averse to disposing of those who get in his way, and is not easily intimidated, usually speaking to others in a very direct and arrogant manner. Prior to his first appearance, he, along with Ken Joshima and Chikusa Kakimoto, is mentioned to have been locked up in a high security Italian prison, which is reserved for the most dangerous of Mafia criminals, who have even committed crimes against the Mafia itself. He cares little for others, and simply considers people to be "toys" he can sacrifice in order to get to what he wants. However, despite claiming this, he tolerates both Ken and Chikusa, and even protects them, as well as sacrifice himself for them, when need be, though does not do so in front of them. He also seems to care for Chrome, though hides it in front of others. To keep his identity hidden, Mukuro periodically controls several people, most notably Lancia, whom he uses as a "fake Mukuro".

Mukuro have a strong resentment for the entire Mafia underground, most likely due in part to the experimentations he suffered as a child at the hands of the Estraneo Mafia family. When Mukuro killed his captors, he offered Chikusa and Ken, who were also victims of experimentation, a chance to join him in his quest to destroy the world. However, not only does he want to take revenge on the Mafia by destroying it, he also wants to cleanse the world of its filth by invoking universal suffering through a world war. Even after becoming the Vongola's Mist Guardian, Mukuro still claims to no longer be part of the Mafia, having been exiled from it, and continues to view the organization with great contempt.

=== Weapons and abilities ===
Known as someone who has driven both the Mafia and police into dangerous and desperate of situations, Mukuro is a deadly opponent. Though Mukuro's main weapon is a trident, and is capable of using combative skills, he is first and foremost a master of illusions, thus he is not easily deceived by illusions that are cast by others. His abilities lie in his "Six Paths of Rebirth" (六道輪廻, Rokudō rinne), six different skills which he claims has been carved into his memories by having had his body go through all six paths to Hades. When using his skills, a Japanese numeral, corresponding to the realm he has entered, appears in his right eye. The skills granted from the individual paths varies from enhancing his physical and mind-controlling abilities, as well as his power of his illusions, to enabling him to control and summon animals.

Mukuro also possesses the Estraneo Family's Possession Bullet, a forbidden bullet which enables a person to possess the body of another person when the possessor is shot with it. With this, Mukuro is able to possess and control the body of anyone that he has cut with his trident. He can possess several bodies simultaneously, and he is also still able to enter the Six Realms, granting him the ability to use a different skill for each body.

== Appearances ==
=== In Reborn! ===
Adult Mukuro as depicted in the future.

After arriving in Japan from Italy, and enrolling in Kokuyo Middle School, ten days prior to their first appearance, Mukuro, Chikusa, and Ken, started a gang made up of Mafia criminals, and began their quest to find the Vongola's tenth generation boss. After having his subordinates attack the strongest students in Namimori Middle School, he successfully draws out the tenth boss, Tsunayoshi Sawada. During Mukuro's fight with Tsuna, he reveals his plans of taking over Tsuna's body in order to take revenge on the Mafia. However, he loses the battle to Tsuna and he and his friends are imprisoned by the Mafia's guardians, the Vendicare.

They later attempt a breakout, but Mukuro uses himself as bait, and ends up being thrown into the lowest level jail cell. Whilst strolling in his illusions, he comes upon Chrome Dokuro, who was on the verge of death, and possesses her, saving her life with illusionary organs. He then makes a bargain with the Vongola to become one of the ring guardians in exchange for Ken and Chikusa's safety. Now sharing an existence with Chrome, Mukuro later helps her defeat Mammon after he emerges in his own form.

In the story's alternate future, Millefiore member Glo Xinia gloats about having defeated him to a displaced Chrome, who had been transported into the future by the Ten-Year Bazooka. However, the future Mukuro had possessed Glo's owl and helps Chrome defeat him in battle. While spying on the Millefiore Family, Mukuro engages Byakuran in battle but is severely wounded. He reappears as an illusion during the Vongola's battle against Byakuran in order to give the Vongola enough time to escape. He is later able to assist them in person after his apprentice, Fran, frees his body from the Vendicare's Prison.

After Tsuna's group returns to the past, Mukuro is lured into possessing Chrome when Daemon Spade endangers her life. Mukuro seemingly defeats Demon, but the latter is able to take over Mukuro's imprisoned body before Mukuro's spirit can return to it and breaks out of prison to confront the group shortly after. He is later restored to his physical form after Tsuna defeats Demon and expel his spirit. As the Vindice acknowledge Mukuro's efforts in his fight with Demon, he is freed and returns to Kokuyo.

Several weeks after the battle with Demon, Mukuro leaves Chrome in Namimori. He finds and recruits Fran into the group. Verde requests for Mukuro and his gang to fight for him in upcoming Arcobaleno battle, which Mukuro accepted in order to fight Tsuna and his Family. During the first day of the Representative battle, Mukuro's team able to defeat five people within ten minutes, thanks to Verde's machine that able to change illusion into reality. At the second day of the Representative battle, he, and his team fight Tsuna's team and Byakuran's team. At the third day of the Representative Battle, he reluctantly formed temporary alliance with Team Reborn to defeat the Vindice. With Chrome's help, they unleashed a combined technique that defeated two Vindice with the last one defeated by Tsuna. After Tsuna's brief battle with Jager and knowing the truth about the Arcobaleno, he, along with the other remaining teams formed alliance with Tsuna as the core to defeat Team Bermuda. At the fourth day of Representative Battle, he, Dino, Squalo, Xanxus, Byakuran, and Hibari confronts Jager, preventing him from helping his teammates while Tsuna, Enma, and Basil defeats them one by one. Jager succeeded in defeating Dino, Squalo, Xanxus, and Byakuran, leaving only Mukuro and Hibari to fight until Tsuna arrived to help. Using his illusion, Mukuro trapped Jager while he's preoccupied with him and Hibari, giving Tsuna the opportunity to defeat the Vindice. His boss watch is then destroyed by Bermuda, disqualifying him.

=== In other media ===
Besides his appearance in the original manga series and its anime adaptation, Mukuro has appeared in other Reborn! works, including all of the series' video games. Mukuro also appears in the first light novel, Hidden Bullet: Mukuro's Illusions, where the events of how Mukuro took over Kokuyo Middle School are revealed. Also, in the series' character book, Vongola77, there is a short story of how Mukuro uses his spiritual powers to control the body of a small boy in Japan in order to once again try to take over Tsuna's body despite being imprisoned in Italy. After failing and realizing that he is incapable of residing in his host body for a long amount of time due to their unstable "connection", he thought of later taking Chrome's body instead.

On November 7, 2007, Pony Canyon released a character CD entitled "Sakura addiction", which features both Mukuro and Hibari. It contains duets and individual songs sung by both voice actors: Toshinobu Iida and Takashi Kondō. The song "Sakura addiction", which was sung by both voice actors, is used as the fifth ending theme for the anime series.

== Reception ==
Mukuro has been highly popular with the Reborn! reader base, having ranked as the most popular villain in the second official Shonen Jump poll of the series, which was divided into heroes and villains. In the third poll of the series, Mukuro ranked as the third most popular male character, losing to Tsunayoshi Sawada and Kyoya Hibari, who took second and first place, respectively. Mukuro then placed in both popularity polls the fourth time around, which was divided into current characters, where he placed fourth, and as characters who fans would most like to see in their future forms, where he placed fourteenth. In the fifth poll, he ranked as the fourth most popular overall character. The Japanese music distributor Recochoku has made two annual survey of which anime characters that people would like to marry. In both years, Mukuro ranked fourth in the category "The Character I Want to Be My Groom." In an Animedia character popularity poll, Mukuro has been featured as the 11th most popular anime character. In the latest Animedia character popularity poll, Mukuro has been featured 21st. A plethora of merchandise has been released in Mukuro's likeness including key chains, plush dolls, and action figures.

Mukuro and Hibari's character CD, "Sakura addiction", became the most successful Reborn! character CD, debuting in ninth place in the Oricon charts. The single reached its peak at seventh place, but remained in the chart's Top 40 till mid-January 2008. The second annual Seiyu Awards nominated both Toshinobu Iida and Takashi Kondō for "Best Musical Performance", and Toshinobu also received a "Best Rookie Actor" nomination for his portrayal as Mukuro Rokudo, but he did not win either.

In publications focused on manga and anime reviews, Mukuro's concept has received praise and acclaim. Leroy Douresseaux of comicbookbin.com views him as "murderous and supernaturally powerful," as well as being a "slippery and formidable villain" by the way he attacks Tsuna and his friends. Sam Kusek of Manga Recon likes Mukuro as the enigmatic villain, though believes him to be a "big creep". He also praises Akira Amano for the originality of Mukuro's techniques, viewing it as "one of the most interesting ideas I've seen," and making him, along with Tsuna, the "real winners overall" of volume 9. However, David Rasmussen from mangalife.com commented that the fight against Mukuro in the manga is a "long, long, DragonBall-Z-sized struggle". As such, he mentioned that the fight is very likable for readers who enjoy "super-powerful people" and long fights. Manga News praised Mukuro's character development in volume 40, commenting that he and Chrome are the heart of the volume. Also, his teamwork with Chrome in the battle against Vindice in the same volume is commented to be rather "tactical but still spectacular."
