= List of Reborn! characters =

Roles in an anime and manga series

A collage of several Reborn! characters as they appear in the anime. From left to right (from the top to bottom): Row 1 – Belphegor, Xanxus, Squalo, Mukuro, Ken, and Chikusa. Row 2 – Haru, Yamamoto, Tsuna, Reborn, and Dr. Shamal. Row 3 – Bianchi, Kyoko, Gokudera, and Ryohei. Row 4 – Basil, Futa, Dino, and Hibari. Row 5 – I-Pin and Lambo.

The Reborn! manga and anime series, known in Japan as Katekyō Hitman Reborn! (Japanese: 家庭教師ヒットマンREBORN!, Hepburn: Katekyō Hittoman Ribōn!), features an extensive cast of characters created by Akira Amano. Set in a fictional town called Namimori in modern Japan, the series' protagonists are of Japanese descent. However, their connection to an Italian Mafia family results in a majority of other characters introduced being mainly of Italian descent, including most of its antagonists.

The story centers on middle school student Tsunayoshi "Tsuna" Sawada, who finds out that he is the heir to the most powerful Mafia family, the Vongola. The current Vongola boss thus sends his most trusted member, the titular character and infant hitman, Reborn, to train the future boss. Tsuna gradually becomes a more confident person and leader, while Reborn slowly recruits members into Tsuna's own Mafia family, which mostly includes Tsuna's schoolmates. Though they encounter new allies in the form of other hitmen and mafiosi, they also attract attention from those who want to annihilate the future boss of the Vongola Family. Enemies such as the Kokuyo Gang, a group of Mafia criminals, and Varia, an elite team of assassins, prove to be formidable challenges for Tsuna's new "family". When the story later shifts into an alternate future, nine years and ten months later, in which some of the characters are transported into, they have to adapt to a world where every Vongola member, as well as their allies, is being hunted down by a powerful rival family of that era, the Millefiore. The characters transported from the past into this future are joined by adult versions of the ones who have yet to be replaced with their younger selves.

Various publications that review manga series have mostly praised the eccentric cast of characters in Reborn!. Some attribute the story's humor to the peculiar characters, with one reviewer positively describing it is as an insane collection of characters. The story's shift into a darker and more serious tone by volume eight garnered even more praise, with some finding the characters being no longer simply used for slapstick comedy pleasing, and that the characters' evolving maturity is gratifying.

== Creation and conception ==
The Reborn! characters have also appeared in Akira Amano's early versions of the series that were meant for adult readers due to the violence that it contained. Amano has referred to most of her characters as "weirdos", and mentioned that though she changed the storyline's style starting from volume 8 of the manga, she still kept adding the weirdo characters.

== Protagonists ==
=== Tsunayoshi Sawada ===
Tsunayoshi Sawada (沢田 綱吉, Sawada Tsunayoshi), commonly known as "Tsuna" (ツナ), is the 14-year-old main protagonist of the series. Because of his severely low self-esteem and lack of talent in any activity, Tsuna is known as "No-Good Tsuna" (ダメツナ, Dame Tsuna) in his middle school, Namimori. After being informed that he is the heir to the Vongola Family, due in part to him being the great-great-great-grandson of the first Vongola boss from 400 years ago, as well as the untimely deaths of the other candidates for the position, Tsuna is trained into becoming a mob-boss by the infant Vongola hitman Reborn. He is often shot by Reborn with a bullet that increases his physical abilities (deathperation bullets) in order for him to fulfill his regrets. That state, which is called the Dying Will Mode, is what gradually makes others see him in a better light. For the most part of the story, Tsuna rejects his position and wants nothing to do with the Mafia, but due to the results of various conflicts involving himself and his friends, his own power matures and he eventually starts embracing his destiny. He is the Bearer of the Sky Ring. Tsuna is voiced by Yukari Kokubun in the anime.

=== Reborn ===
Reborn (リボーン, Ribōn) is the title character. An Arcobaleno and the holder of the Yellow pacifier of the Sun, Reborn is an infant hitman belonging to the Vongola Family. As the Vongola IX's most trusted member, he becomes Tsuna's home tutor and trains him into becoming a Mafia boss using torturous ways. He often shoots Tsuna with special bullets that enhances his abilities; these bullets are created inside his shape-shifting chameleon "partner" named Leon (レオン, Reon), who usually sits on Reborn's fedora. No matter how strong the emotion, Reborn always keeps a straight face and handles many situations as calmly as possible. Reborn often says "Ciaossu" (a mix of the Italian "ciao" and the Japanese "ossu", which is a casual male greeting). Later in the manga, this is revealed to be a mispronunciation of his real catchphrase, "chaos," developed because he was unable to pronounce the consonants of "chaos" in his baby form. Reborn also appears randomly dressed as "another person" who no one recognizes except for Tsuna and Dino, despite his disguises being obvious to the audience. Reborn is voiced and portrayed by Neeko in the anime and the stage plays respectively. In his short appearances as an adult, he is also voiced by Ken Narita.

=== Hayato Gokudera ===
Hayato Gokudera (獄寺 隼人, Gokudera Hayato) is a 14-year-old transfer student from Italy who is placed in Tsuna's class. Gokudera is a dynamite expert nicknamed "Smokin' Bomb Hayato" (スモーキン・ボム 隼人 Sumōkin Bomu Hayato), or "Hurricane Bomb Hayato" in the anime. He keeps various explosives hidden on his body and uses those explosives liberally by lighting them with a cigarette (or several) held in his mouth. Initially, he comes to Japan in order to test Tsuna's strength, and after the latter risks his life to save Gokudera, he devotes himself entirely to Tsuna, having sworn to become his right-hand man. A hot-headed and short-tempered youth, Gokudera continuously gets into fights with several characters especially to those who try to get too close to Tsuna. Despite his personality, he is considered to be a genius, excelling in his academic studies. He is Tsuna's Guardian of the Storm Ring. Gokudera is voiced by Hidekazu Ichinose in the anime.

=== Takeshi Yamamoto ===
Takeshi Yamamoto (山本 武, Yamamoto Takeshi) is the 14-year-old popular baseball star of Namimori Middle School. Despite his carefree and outgoing personality, Yamamoto initially has no confidence in doing anything other than baseball, even attempting to commit suicide after sustaining major injury to his arm. After Tsuna reassures him, the two become close friends, and Reborn tries to recruit him into the Vongola Family. He hardly takes anything seriously, and is usually oblivious to what is truly happening around him, often tricked by Reborn into participating in Mafia-related events because he thinks that they are all just playing a game. Though he becomes a dedicated and valuable member of Tsuna's family, growing to become a fighter who excels at swordsmanship, he still does not understand the full extent of the situation surrounding the Mafia. He is Tsuna's Guardian of the Rain Ring. Yamamoto is voiced by Suguru Inoue in the anime.

=== Lambo ===
Lambo (ランボ, Ranbo) is a cow suit-clad 5-year-old assassin from Italy affiliated with the Bovino ("Bovino" means "bovine" in Italian) Family. He has a huge afro (which he stores a variety of objects in, such as snacks and weapons) with horns on the sides of his head. Despite being a hitman, he lacks the emotional maturity and discipline that Reborn has and is also very conceited as well as being a crybaby. In order to prove that he is worthy of becoming his own family's boss, Lambo comes to Japan to kill Reborn, though he only proves that he is no match for the Vongola hitman. He also possesses his family's Ten-Year Bazooka, which replaces his present himself with another version of himself ten years from the future. He is Tsuna's Guardian of the Lightning Ring. Lambo is voiced by Junko Takeuchi, while Adult Lambo is voiced by Kenjirō Tsuda.

=== Ryohei Sasagawa ===
Ryohei Sasagawa (笹川 了平, Sasagawa Ryōhei) is a 15-year-old passionate member of the boxing club at Namimori Middle School. Ryohei is extremely loudmouthed. He constantly asks others he believe are strong to join his club, most notably Tsuna. In response, Reborn wants to recruit him into Tsuna's family. Every time he sees Tsuna and his family doing something strange, Ryohei gets fired up and always wants to be a part of it. Because of his energetic personality, however, he does not understand the full extent of Tsuna's connection with the Mafia, but still does everything that he can to protect him and fights with as much spirit and confidence as the others. Proficient in hand-to-hand combat, Ryohei's boxing training lead to his peak physical condition. He has a habit of always saying "kyokugen!" (or "to the extreme") as a single response or as an ending to his sentences. He is Tsuna's Guardian of the Sun Ring. Ryohei is voiced by Hidenobu Kiuchi in the anime.

=== Kyoya Hibari ===
Kyoya Hibari (雲雀 恭弥, Hibari Kyōya) is the leader of the Namimori Middle Discipline Committee, or Prefects, whose members are a group of delinquents loyal to him despite his lack of care for them. Though he speaks in a calm tone, Hibari is an excellent but violent fighter who wields a pair of tonfa as his primary weapons. Though he uses his status to harass others, he actually has great pride in his school, and has a soft side towards animals and small children. However, students are not the only ones who fear him, teachers and other town residents know of him as well since he enforces his form of order throughout the entire town. He prefers to be alone, usually beating up those who crowd near him. Despite caring little about the events surrounding Tsuna and his friends, Hibari takes a great interest in Reborn after seeing his abilities, which is reciprocated by Reborn, who wants to recruit him as part of Tsuna's own family. He is Tsuna's Guardian of the Cloud Ring. Hibari is voiced by Takashi Kondō in the anime.

=== Mukuro Rokudo ===
Mukuro Rokudo (六道 骸, Rokudō Mukuro) is a 15-year-old Mafia criminal who escaped from an Italian prison, which held some of the most dangerous Mafia criminals, before he was to be executed. Not long after, Mukuro, along with his two subordinates, came to Japan, enrolled in Kokuyo Junior High, and formed the Kokuyo Gang, which consists of heinous criminals who have recently escaped from prison. Skilled in casting illusions as well as mind control, Mukuro attempts to take his revenge on the Mafia by taking over the body of Mafia criminal Lancia and uses him to wreak havoc. When his plan fails due to Tsuna's interference, he is once again imprisoned. Later on in the story, after possessing the body of Kokuyo Gang member Chrome Dokuro, Mukuro takes on a more supportive role for the series' characters, though still prefers not to associate with them. Mukuro is voiced by Toshinobu Iida in the anime.

=== Chrome Dokuro ===
Chrome Dokuro (クローム 髑髏, Kurōmu Dokuro) is a 13-year-old Japanese girl who is recruited by the Kokuyo Gang. She was originally named Nagi (凪) until Mukuro Rokudo saved her life by creating illusionary organs for her when she lost her right eye and some of her internal organs in an accident. Since then, Chrome and Mukuro are sharing the same body. She is named the holder of the Vongola Mist Ring. After being transferred into the future, Chrome's physical condition takes a turn for the worse as several of her internal organs begin to fail. Under Future Hibari's instructions, she uses the power of her Vongola Ring to sustain her organs via her own illusions, thus avoiding any immediate danger. Chrome is voiced by Satomi Akesaka in the anime.

== Antagonists ==
=== Kokuyo Gang ===
The Kokuyo Gang is a group of Mafia criminals who have escaped from a high-security prison. The gang is formed by its leader Mukuro Rokudo after he escaped from prison on the eve of his execution along with several prisoners. The gang moved to Japan to look for the successor of Vongola and took over Kokuyo Junior High within three days. Aside from Mukuro, key members of the Kokuyo Gang includes Ken Joshima, Chikusa Kakimoto, and Chrome Dokuro. Other members of the gang also include Lancia, M.M, Birds, the Bloody Twins, and Flan.

=== Varia ===
The Varia is an elite and independent assassination team under the Vongola Family. They are composed of genius assassins who work in the deepest recesses of the Mafia. Each member takes on missions that are said to be impossible to accomplish by humans. They do not accept a mission unless they believe there is a 90% chance of success. Those that see them work often say that their high-level assassination skills are demonic. Despite lacking loyalty and respect for other members, they are extremely loyal to their leader, Xanxus. The key members of the Varia include Superbia Squalo, Belphegor, Lussuria, Levi A Than, and Gola Moska. The Arcobaleno Mammon (Viper) is also part of the Varia. In the future ten years later, Fran is also part of the group. The Varia also appear to have more than fifty subordinates ranged under the command of the main members. The Varia is apparently reclusive, only showing themselves after Iemitsu Sawada disappeared.

=== Millefiore Family ===
The Millefiore Family (ミルフィオーレファミリー, Mirufiōre Famirī) is a Mafia family that is engaged in battle against the Vongola Family in the future ten years later. The Millefiore is a result of the merging of two separate Mafia families: the Gesso (ジェッソ, Jesso) Family led by Byakuran, and the Giglio Nero (ジッリョネロ, Jirryo Nero) Family led by Uni. They are organized into two groups to distinguish their old families, which are then further separated into 17 different squads, each named for a plant or flower. Those originally from the Giglio Nero are the Black Spell and have the tendency to engage in direct combat, while those from the Gesso are the White Spell and specializes in cunning battle tactics. There appears to be animosity between members of the White Spell and the Black Spell, resulting in a lack of communication and sabotage by individual squads. Their organization also possesses the Mare Rings, a set of seven rings on par with the Vongola Rings originally belonging solely to the Giglio Nero.

=== Demon Spade ===
Demon Spade was originally the first-generation Vongola Mist Guardian. However, he later betrayed the Vongola Primo, Giotto, forcing him to step down as the Vongola Boss. After Giotto's resignation as Vongola Boss, Demon became the Vongola Second Mist Guardian and continued to watch over Vongola for generation to generation by cutting off his attachment with his own body and survive for years by continuously possessing people in order to make sure that the Vongola stay strong. He is responsible for arranging the battle between tenth-generation Simon Family led by Enma and the tenth-generation Vongola Family led by Tsuna. Demon is a dangerous and expert illusionist, having the ability to create fake weapons with his real illusions and also has the ability to seal away his enemies into his illusionary world.

=== Vindice ===
The Vindice are the guards of Mafia law who punish those who defy their law without mercy and imprison Mafia criminals in the Vindice Prison, a prison from which no one had ever been able to escape. They have existed ever since the founding of the Mafia. Each of the Vindice possesses a black flame called the Flame of Night, which allows them to teleport to any place they wish to go. They are led by their boss Bermuda von Veckenschtein, an Arcobaleno with the Clear Pacifier and who was used to be known as the strongest Arcobaleno. They participate in the Representative Battle of the Rainbow after defeating and stealing the watches of Team Skull in order to get their revenge on Checker Face.

== Supporting characters ==
=== Kyoko Sasagawa ===
Kyoko Sasagawa (笹川 京子, Sasagawa Kyōko) is the girl Tsuna has a crush on. She is Ryohei's younger sister and a student of Namimori Middle School alongside Tsuna's friends. Though she is not fully aware of how much Tsuna loves her, Kyoko thinks of him as a good friend. Although later on in the story, it is hinted that she has feelings for him. Kyoko is kind, caring, and sweet, but is also airheaded, initially thinking that all the events surrounding Tsuna are part of a game. She first witnessed Tsuna in action after being sent nine years and ten months into the future right when her future self was being attacked by the Millefiore soldiers. Growing more suspicious of Tsuna and his friends' actions, she and Haru spy on them until they learn the truth about them and the Mafia. She is voiced by Yūna Inamura in the anime.

=== Haru Miura ===
Haru Miura (三浦 ハル, Miura Haru) is a student of Midori Middle School, a tough elite school to get into in the area. She is an eccentric and peppy girl with a tendency to jump to wild conclusions, and has various odd costumes that she designs herself, as well as a myriad of wild habits. She initially adores Reborn, but after she is saved from drowning by Tsuna, Haru diverted her adoration towards him instead. She loves and is overprotective of children, and is usually the one to babysit Lambo and I-Pin alongside Kyoko. According to Tsuna, Future Haru has become more feminine but her way of thinking is still the same. Growing more suspicious of Tsuna and his friends' actions, she and Kyoko spy on them until they learn the truth about them and the Mafia. Haru is voiced by Hitomi Yoshida in the anime. She also appeared as the main host of the "Haru-Haru Interview: Dangerous" post-credits segment in the anime.

=== I-Pin ===
I-Pin (イーピン, Īpin) is a 5-year-old assassin from Hong Kong. Her main ability is the usage of Gyoza-Ken, which combines her martial arts abilities with special gyoza buns laced with the scent of garlic, the latter of which numbs the brain and forces the muscles to involuntarily move on their own. I-Pin's most destructive ability is the Pinzu-Time Bomb, activated whenever she expresses extreme shyness; pin-numbers (like those used in mahjong) appear on her forehead, counting down until it turns her into a human bomb that can create a small crater with its destruction. Due to her near-sightedness, I-Pin sees Lambo as a broccoli monster and often beats him up. She also has a crush on Kyoya Hibari, who bears a striking resemblance to her master Fon, and often activates the Pinzu-Timed Super Explosion after seeing him. She can be also transformed into her 15-year-old self through Lambo's Ten-Year Bazooka; the 15-year-old "Adult I-Pin" is more fluent in Japanese, and despite the fact that she is one of the most promising young assassins, she works part-time at a ramen shop ten years later in order to earn money for college tuition, though she still retains her fighting skills. I-Pin is voiced by Li-Mei Chiang in the anime.

=== Bianchi ===
Bianchi (ビアンキ, Bianki) is Gokudera's half-sister; they share the same father. Bianchi, known as "Poison Scorpion Bianchi" in the Mafia underground, specializes in poison cooking. Since she is immune to her own cooking herself, she does not see anything wrong with the food she gives to others. Even though they seem to have a strained relationship, Bianchi has shown great concern for Gokudera if he is injured, fighting, or suffering from stomach aches, which she does not realize are caused by her (except if they do not have eye contact). In the past, she was in love with her ex-boyfriend Romeo, who looks very similar to Adult Lambo. Whenever Adult Lambo appears, she mistakes him for Romeo, and uses her Poison Cooking to attack him. Bianchi is romantically involved with her former associate Reborn, and wants to kill Tsuna to free up Reborn's schedule, although she refused to kill him for the benefit of others. Bianchi always states that "love" is the strongest force of all. In the future, Bianchi returns with crucial information about the Millefiore Family after her travelling with Futa. She tries to train Gokudera on how to control the rings and boxes, and is shown to be able to summon scorpions which emanate the Dying Will Flame, called Scorpione De Tempesta (Storm Scorpions). Bianchi is voiced by Rie Tanaka in the anime.

=== Dino ===
Dino (ディーノ, Dīno) is the 22-year-old tenth-generation boss of the Cavallone Family (キャバッローネファミリー, Kyabarrōne Famirī) which is part of the Vongola Family alliance. Dino is a young man with great skills as a fighter and a leader. Reborn's chameleon Leon created his main weapons, a whip and Enzo, which is a turtle which grows in size and rampages when soaked in water. Like Tsuna, Dino was initially a klutz who did not want anything to do with the Mafia, but he became a suitable Mafia boss after Reborn became his home tutor. He came to be known as "Bucking-Horse Dino" (跳ね馬ディーノ, Haneuma Dīno) ("Bronco Dino" in Viz's translation) and fixed the Cavallone's financial problems, turning them into the third most influential family. However, Dino is so devoted to his family that when none of his family members are around his skills decrease dramatically, often accidentally hitting people with his whip or falling down the stairs. Before the Vongola Tournament, Dino becomes Hibari's home tutor and travels with him around the country in order to train him. In the future, he advises Tsuna and the others on how to control their box weapons, and is shown to release a horse from his own box. Dino is first voiced by Kenta Kamakari, and then replaced by Kenn for episodes 34 onwards.

=== Nana Sawada ===
Nana Sawada (沢田 奈々, Sawada Nana) is Tsuna's mother, who, despite caring deeply for him, has fairly little belief in her son succeeding in life. She helps feed all the people that are presently living in her house and does not see anything strange with any of them. She seems to be unaware of the fact that both her husband and her son are part of the Mafia, but is aware they are both up to something dangerous. In the "Haru-Haru Interview: Dangerous" anime segment, it was also mentioned that Nana was considered a Yamato Nadeshiko by Reborn. Nana is voiced by Rika Fukami in the anime.

=== Futa ===
Futa (フゥ太, Fūta) is a young boy who ranks people by their abilities in a book half of his own height. His full name is Fuuta Delle Stelle (Fuuta de la Stella, or Fuuta of the stars). He has an extremely wide range of knowledge on thousands of people and is considered to be a valuable informant for the Mafia, sometimes being paid insane amounts of money for a copy of certain rankings, but due to this, he is often chased by the Mafia. When he ranks people, gravity around him becomes distorted, making objects around him float, and images of stars and galaxies appear in his eyes. It is unknown how he actually gathers his information, some rumours say he talks to a ranking star, and his rankings do become skewed when it rains. He also has to be looking at the person to determine their rankings. He calls Tsuna Sawada his big brother (referring to Tsuna as "Tsuna-ni") and starts living in his house. In volume nine of the manga, after he has been controlled by Mukuro Rokudo for quite a long amount of time, it was revealed that he lost his power to rank, and follows the guardians around while living at Tsuna's house. In the future, after gathering information with Bianchi, Futa, who now carries a suitcase rather than a book, returns to Japan with crucial information about the Millefiore Family. Futa also reveals that he was Lambo's guardian until three years before Tsuna's arrival in the future, and prefers that Lambo not be endangered. Futa is voiced by Yuko Sanpei in the anime.

=== Hana Kurokawa ===
Hana Kurokawa (黒川 花, Kurokawa Hana) is one of Tsuna's classmates and Kyoko's friend. She appears more observant and thoughtful than most of the other characters. Though she does not know the truth, she remains suspicious of Tsuna's and his friends' activities. She has a crush on the 15-year-old Lambo in the normal time. At the same time, she hates children (especially the child form Lambo), to the point where she gets hives when she gets annoyed by them. In the future, it is hinted that she has a relationship with Kyoko's older brother Ryohei. She is voiced by Miki Ootani in the anime.

=== Doctor Shamal ===
Dr. Shamal (Dr. シャマル, Dr. Shamaru) is a crazed womanizer who hits on every cute woman he sees, though often fails. He is said to be hiding in Japan after being charged in his own country for putting the moves on 2082 women simultaneously, one of which being a queen. He is both a skilled doctor (albeit one that refuses to treat men) and renowned assassin known as "Trident Shamal", who was even asked to join the Varia. His primary means of combat stem from the 666 pills he carries that contain trident mosquitoes, his own breed of genetically altered mosquitoes named for their trident-shaped stingers that infect his enemies with deadly diseases. He claims to be infected with 666 diseases that have no effect on him due to the negating effects of each disease; if he has a disease that rapidly decreases body temperature, then he has another one that increases it, and so on. Shamal also happens to be the one that introduced Hayato Gokudera to bombs when he used to work for Gokudera's family. He agrees to become Gokudera's home tutor during the Vongola Tournament, but only after Gokudera learns that protecting his own life is just as important as defending those around him. Dr. Shamal is voiced by Toshinobu Katsuya in the anime.

=== Tsuyoshi Yamamoto ===
Tsuyoshi Yamamoto (山本 剛, Yamamoto Tsuyoshi) is the father of Takeshi Yamamoto who owns a sushi restaurant named TakeSushi. He is also one of the wielders of the Shigure Soen Ryu sword style. He is voiced by Takashi Matsuyama in the anime.

=== Vongola Family ===
Giotto and his guardians. From left to right, Alaudi, Knuckle, G, Giotto, Ugetsu Asari, Lampo, and Demon Spade.

The Vongola Family (ボンゴレファミリー, Bongore Famirī) is the most powerful Mafia family since its creation 400 years prior to the start of the series. Giotto a.k.a. Vongola Primo is the founder of the Vongola Family. His guardians; G., Ugetsu Asari, Knuckle, Lampo, Alaudi, and Demon Spade, all bear similar traits to Tsuna's guardians. After his retirement, he stayed in Japan by the name of Ieyasu Sawada (沢田 家康, Sawada Ieyasu).

They possess the Vongola Rings, seven invaluable rings which have been around since the founding of the Mafia underworld and are usually in possession of the main members known as the Vongola Guardians. They are also rich in various traditions, most notably the Vongola Tournament, a traditional battle in which two groups vie for the seven guardian positions.

By the start of the series, Timoteo (ティモッテオ) a.k.a. Vongola Nono (ボンゴレIX代目(ノーノ), Bongore Nono) is the current head of the Vongola family. It is implied that he is becoming too weak to lead the family, and thus accepted Tsuna as the next head of the Vongola Family. However, Xanxus, his adopted son, deemed himself more worthy to become the next boss, so he kidnapped and replaced IX with a fake, who sanctioned the traditional Vongola Tournament. The real IX was placed within the Gola Mosca machine, gradually draining him of his life energy, until he is saved by Tsuna.

==== Giotto ====
Giotto (ジョット, Jotto), also known as Vongola Primo (ボンゴレI世(プリーモ), Bongore Purīmo), is the founder and first-generation boss of the Vongola Family in the late 19th century. An Italian, he is also the creator of the Zero Point Breakthrough technique. After his retirement, he moved to Japan and started a family, changing his family name to Sawada to ensure no one outside the family knew about his Mafia identity. He is the paternal great-great-great-grandfather of Tsuna, who has repeatedly been shown to be similar to him, as they have the same weapon and techniques (including the Zero Point Breakthrough), almost identical appearances, and equally unorthodox Famiglias (the First Famiglia included aristocrats, military men, rival mafiosos and religious people). Their Guardians are quite similar as well: Yamamoto, Hibari, Mukuro, Lambo, Gokudera, and Ryohei have already been shown to be very much like their first predecessors in appearance, weapon of choice, and personality.

=== Arcobaleno ===
The Arcobaleno (which means "rainbow" in Italian) is the group of the seven strongest infants, who each possesses a pacifier colored as one of the colors of the rainbow, with each color corresponding with their Dying Will Flame. Their pacifiers will glow when a member nears another Arcobaleno. They were all transformed from adults into their current forms, having sacrificed themselves in order to protect the ultimate power "7³" (Tri-Ni-Sette). Each of them gained their own "curse" and specific abilities, and are able to emit the Dying Will Flame throughout their entire body. In addition to Reborn, the Arcobaleno are:

- Luce (ルーチェ, Rūche), the first holder of Orange pacifier of the Sky and the boss of Giglio Nero Family. Becoming the Sky Arcobaleno, her curse not only changed her into a baby, but also shortened her life span. Sometimes afterwards, she died and passed her Arcobaleno title to her daughter, Aria (アリア). A month before the merging between Giglio Nero and Gesso, Aria succumbed to her curse and died, passing Arcobaleno title and Giglio Nero to her young daughter, Uni. Both Luce and Aria are voiced by Atsuko Yuya in the anime.
- Colonnello (コロネロ, Koronero), the holder of the Blue pacifier of the Rain. Though he is not part of the original seven Arcobaleno, he attained the blue pacifier after attempting to take the place of a member on the day that they were all turned into babies. A former member of the COMSUBIN, he carries heavy artillery, using an anti-tank rifle as his primary weapon. His animal partner is a falcon named Falco, that usually rests atop his head and it can help him fly to distant places. Colonnello acts like a rival towards Reborn and vice versa, but despite this, he shares many traits with Reborn, like being a merciless tutor, suddenly taking naps, and having a sharp tongue. He is voiced by Daisuke Nakamura in the anime.
- Fon (風, Fon), the holder of the Red pacifier of the Storm. He is shown to be one of the wisest and strongest of the Arcobaleno and also always seems to know what is going on. A Chinese martial artist and I-Pin's master, Fon masters at least 104 martial arts with his strongest art is the Exploding Gale Fist that is said to be invincible. His pet is a white monkey named Reach. He also looks physically similar to Kyoya Hibari, although the exact nature of their relation remains unknown. Fon is voiced by Takashi Kondō, who also share the same voice with Hibari.
- Skull (スカル, Skaru), the holder of the Purple pacifier of the Cloud. Skull wears a full leather outfit and a motorcycle helmet reminiscent of the time he was a stunt man. His pet is a giant armored octopus named Tako whose tentacles follow his hand and finger movements. He is voiced by Tetsuya Yanagihara in the anime.
- Viper (バイパー, Baipā), the holder of the Indigo pacifier of the Mist. Viper is a member of the elite assassination team, the Varia, under the name Mammon (マーモン, Māmon). Known as the Arcobaleno's best spellcaster, Viper has the ability to cast illusions, as well as being able to locate any person by sneezing into a piece of paper. Viper also has a black frog named Fantasma that lies on top of their head. By turning into a yellow salamander and biting its tail, which forms into a "halo" above them, Fantasma can give Mammon the ability to fly. Viper claims to have been trying to break the Arcobaleno curse, and had sealed their pacifier so that other Arcobaleno cannot sense them. Viper has also created a chain that conceals the power of the Arcobaleno pacifiers, as well as the Ring Flames. Viper is voiced by Rumi Shishido in the anime.
- Verde (ヴェルデ, Verude), the holder of the Green pacifier of the Thunder, and one of the three creators of the Box Weapons. Appearing as a scientist, Verde is more interested in his studies than he is in the curse of the rainbow, as indicated during the Curse of the Rainbow arc when he reveals he was only participating to give Reborn "a good scare." His pet is a green crocodile named Cayman. He is voiced by Masahiro Kono in the anime.
- Lal Mirch (ラル・ミルチ, Raru Miruchi), the holder of a corrupted pacifier. She states that she cannot live up to the Arcobaleno name, considering herself to be one of its weakest members. This is due to her curse being incomplete after Colonnello, her former subordinate in the COMSUBIN, attempted to take her place. Also, if she does not use her Arcobaleno powers, her curse would gradually disappear, which is why she eventually becomes an adult again. However, upon using her Arcobaleno powers in the future, her pacifier glows blue, and she states that her pacifier was supposed to be the blue pacifier that Colonnello attained. She is also part of the Vongola's CEDEF, or Outside Advisors. She is voiced by Masami Suzuki in the anime.

=== CEDEF ===
Members of the Consulenza Esterna Della Famiglia (Italian for "External Consultants of the Family") are unofficial members of the Vongola Family. They hold a very important position in the family's structure, in that, during times of crisis, the CEDEF leader becomes the Vongola's second-in-command. They also have as much voting power as the Vongola boss when choosing the family's next boss, and if the two disagree on who the heir will be, the CEDEF leader has the power to split the Vongola Rings.

==== Iemitsu Sawada ====
Iemitsu Sawada (沢田 家光, Sawada Iemitsu) is Tsuna's often absent father, who has supposedly been "working abroad at oil fields" for the past two years. He usually carries a pickaxe. Tsuna believes that he is a loser father who has nothing to do with the Mafia, but Iemitsu is actually the "Outside Advisor", who has the second-highest position in the Vongola Family, and is known as the Vongola's "Young Lion". After the fake Vongola IX chose Xanxus as his successor, Iemitsu, who wants Tsuna to become the next boss, protested and refused to give Xanxus the Vongola Rings, traveling around the world while he waited for the IX's reply. He returns to Japan with the real halves of the Vongola Rings, as well as a message from the IX sanctioning the Vongola Tournament. He secretly watches over the training of Tsuna and his family, and during the tournament, Iemitsu goes to Italy with his subordinates, and finds out that the IX that has been giving orders was a fake. Iemitsu is voiced by Masami Iwasaki in the anime.

==== Basil ====
Basilicum, commonly known as simply "Basil" (バジル, Bajiru), is Iemitsu's young disciple and subordinate. He possesses the blue, rain attribute flame, and has the ability to go into Dying Will Mode when he consumes special pills made by Iemitsu. Due to being strictly trained since early childhood, he is a very talented fighter. Unknown to Basil, in order for Iemitsu to safely deliver the real halves of the Vongola rings to Japan, he was sent to deliver the fake Vongola Rings to Tsuna. During this mission, Basil encounters Squalo, and is subsequently beat. Despite being used as a decoy, he remains extremely loyal to Iemitsu, and helps train Tsuna in order to help the latter control the Dying Will Flame. The CEDEF later sends him into the future as a support for the Vongola, and his box weapon is shown to release a dolphin, which he can telepathically communicate with. Basil also has a habit of speaking in an archaic manner; usually replacing 'You' with 'thou', 'thee', and 'thy', and refers to Tsuna and the guardians with the suffix '-dono'. This unusual habit sometimes interferes in his way of modern speech. Basil is voiced by Yuka Terasaki in the anime.

=== Cervello ===
The Cervello (チェルベッロ, Cheruberro) is an organization whose representatives consist of masked women who all seem to look exactly the same and whose names are not known. When one member is beaten or killed, another member can immediately take their place. The organization also appears to possess illusionists. They are proclaimed as the judges for the Vongola Tournament under the (fake) IX's direct orders. In the future, they are working with or in conjunction with Shoichi Irie, and appear to be part of the Millefiore Family's White Spell squad. During the Six Funeral Wreaths's battle against Tsuna's group, the Cervello are appointed as the judges. It was stated that each Mafia family have their own Cervello organisation.

=== Foundation ===
The Foundation is an organization created by the Future Kyoya Hibari in order to gather information on the "ultimate power". Its members are former members of Namimori High's Disciplinary Committee, most notably Tetsuya Kusakabe (草壁 哲矢, Kusakabe Tetsuya), Hibari's subordinate and second-in-command, who always wears his hair in a pompadour. Kusakabe is voiced by Shun Takagi in the anime.

=== Simon Family ===
The Simon Family has deep ties to the Vongola Family, but vanished at the end of the Vongola Primo's rule because of Demon Spade. At the beginning of the Inheritance Ceremony Arc, the Simon Family were thought to be evil. However, after the truth was revealed, they joined forces with the Vongola Family led by Tsuna.

==== Cozzato Simon ====
Cozzato Simon (シモン･コザァート, Shimon Kozāto) is the first-generation boss of Simon Family and Enma's ancestor. He had close bonds with Vongola Primo, Giotto, as close as brothers. He was said to be betrayed by Giotto during a massive mafia war and was killed from limbs to limbs. However, in reality, he was saved by Giotto's Guardians who had seen through Demon's plan and afterwards along with Giotto, they made a deal with the Vindice that if Vongola and Simon ever fight against one another, the Vindice will deliver the punishment. After the war, he and his Family went back into hiding and never met Giotto or Vongola again for the rest of their lifetime but not before making an oath with Giotto that their Families will stay close until the end of time and believe their descendants will meet and smile at each other again.

==== Enma Kozato ====
Enma Kozato (古里 炎真, Kozato Enma) is the tenth-generation boss of the near-eradicated Simon Family. He was introduced as a transfer student at Namimori Middle School with his fellow subordinates. After he shows his timid personality during his introduction, he starts getting bullied. He became friends with Tsuna after an incident. Enma later decided to leave a letter to Tsuna to test if he really treated him as a friend. Unfortunately, the letter got dumped into the bin by Lambo, which led to the battle between the Vongola and the Simon family. Later on in the story, Enma becomes possessed by Demon Spade because of his anger and hatred, causing his powers to go berserk, but is stopped by Tsuna for good. After the truth was revealed, Enma joined forces with Tsuna and defeated Demon Spade. Since then, the two became close friends.

=== Longchamp Naito ===
Longchamp Naito (内藤 ロンシャン, Naitō Ronshan) is a manga-exclusive character. He is the overly-hyper, eighth-generation boss-in-training of the Tomaso Family. He happens to attend the same school as Tsuna, but they first meet in their second year when they end up in the same class. Unlike Tsuna, Longchamp is optimistic and excited about everything, and though their families are rivals, he constantly befriends Tsuna. Longchamp is known to have a unique taste in women, and is shown with a different one each time. He also has a weird habit of collecting unusual objects, including dead batteries and condiment packets, and his bedroom is covered with junk as a result of his hoarding habits. His family is the creator of the Sorry Bullet (嘆き弾, Nageki Dan), which, when shot with and revived, will cause a person to grieve about all the terrible things that have happened in their life, making others feel sorry for them.

=== Kawahira ===
Kawahira (川平 Kawahira) is a man who lives in the future at a real estate firm that belonged to an old lady who Haru knew in the past. He is constantly referred to in earlier episodes as a frequent customer of Adult I-Pin's ramen delivery service, but makes his first appearance when Tsuna and company are trying to hide from the Real Six Funeral Wreaths. He possesses a Segno Hell Ring that can create strong illusions, fake murderous intent, and hides his existence. He does not outwardly state his true motives but claims that Tsuna and his friends owe him one for his help.

He is later revealed to be the true identity of Checker Face (チェッカーフェイス Chekkāfeisū), a man with iron hat who is responsible for inflicting The Curse of The Rainbow on Reborn and the others, making them the Arcobaleno. He appeared in the Arcobaleno's dream and offered them a way to be freed from the curse that had turned them into babies with by creating a battle royale where the Arcobaleno have to choose seven people to be their representatives to fight in their place and the winner will have his or her curse removed. However, this turned out to be a huge lie and his true intention is actually to determine the seven strongest people and intends to turn them into the next Arcobaleno without any intention to free the current Arcobaleno from their curse.

As the one who administrates the Tri-ni-sette, he is the one who gave the Vongola Rings and Mare Rings to Uni's ancestor, Sepira, who in turn entrusted the Vongola Rings to Giotto. For decades, he had selected and tricked seven people in each generation that he considered the strongest through contract job or representative battle and forcefully make them protect the Arcobaleno pacifier, cursing them into babies. After Bermuda's defeat, he appears in front of Tsuna and the others and reveal his true identity as Kawahira. He, alongside Uni, are the last two special races that had been existed even far before humans whose job are to protect the Earth through Tri-ni-sette. However, their race died one by one until he and Sepira are the only ones remained. They decided to split the seven stones of Tri-ni-set into Arcobaleno Pacifiers, Vongola Rings, and Mare Rings and gave them to the human race as they alone unable to provide enough flames for the rings. He intended to remove the pacifiers from Reborn and the others and cursed those he had selected, however, Talbot arrives and came up with another solution to keep the Tri-ni-set safe. With Uni's assurance of the future of the Tri-ni-sette, Kawahira agreed to give up the order of the Tri-ni-sette to Bermuda and the Vindice, entrusting them to the future generations, and removes the Arcobaleno curse from Reborn and the others.

== Merchandise ==
Several types of merchandise have been produced based on the likeness of the Reborn! characters. Apparels from the series include replicas of the characters' clothes, such as Tsuna's X-Gloves or Reborn's hat. Other merchandise modeled after their likeness includes action figures, plush dolls, key chains, and figurines. Characters are also featured in the series' soundtracks, in which their corresponding voice actors perform songs related to their characters. They are also featured in the various games released for the series, including in video games that are mostly of the fighting game genre, and on trading cards that are part of the Reborn! trading card game.

== Reception ==
The characters introduced in the Reborn! series have been both criticized and praised in several reviews of the series. With the first seven manga volumes being devoted to introducing various new characters whilst still focusing heavily on the main characters, a reviewer from comicbookbin.com believes that "Akira Amano composes each chapter as a separate episode, like a TV series, with a main cast and a guest character appearing each chapter." He describes the ever-expanding cast of peculiar characters as a line-up of eccentrics that fit right in with the main cast, but later comments that the author strains the narrative in the sixth volume due to giving some minor characters like Longchamp Naito too much attention. Still, he positively remarks that the hilariously weird things the characters do has not been done since Seinfeld, and Erin Finnegan of Pop Culture Shock agrees, attributing the story's humor to the characters. Michael Aronson of Manga Life describes it is as the "most insane collection of characters thrown together in a single series," while Ben Leary of Mania.com fairly says that "many of the plots are dependent on the cute, practically SD characters who would probably be mascots in another series."

Though most of the characters' reviews for volumes one through seven are primarily based on their ensuing comedic situations, the tone changes drastically as the series shifts into a more serious mood starting with volume eight. In ComicsVillage.com's Charles Tan's review of volume eight, he notes that the character designs have a "simple, iconic feel to them," and that they can easily shift from being super-deformed to having serious expressions. Both in IGN's and mangalife.com's review of volume nine, the reviewers both expressed gratification to the main character's [Tsuna] reform, with David Rasmussen of mangalife.com now seeing Tsuna as a "cooler" character compared to how he was before. A.E. Sparrow of IGN further comments on how the characters are further developed rather than being simply used for slapstick comedy, but due to that, the readers can find themselves being concerned for their well-being.
