= List of Reborn! antagonists =

The antagonists of the Reborn! anime and manga series, known in Japan as Katekyō Hitman Reborn!, are created by Akira Amano. Set in a fictional town called Namimori in modern Japan, the series' main protagonists are of Japanese descent. However, their connection to an Italian Mafia family results in a majority of other characters introduced being mainly of Italian descent, including most of its antagonists.

The story centers on middle school student Tsunayoshi "Tsuna" Sawada, who finds out that he is the heir to the Vongola crime family. Reborn, the titular character and infant hitman, is sent to train him, and slowly recruits members into Tsuna's own Mafia family. They eventually attract attention from those who want to annihilate the future boss of the Vongola Family. Enemies such as the Kokuyo Gang, a group of Mafia criminals, and The Varia, an elite team of assassins, prove to be formidable challenges for Tsuna and his comrades. When some of the characters are later transported into an alternate future, nine years and ten months later, they have to adapt to a world where every Vongola member, as well as their allies, is being hunted down by a powerful rival family, the Millefiore. After returning from the future, they have to fight against an allied Family of Vongola since first generation who's seeking revenge to Vongola, Simon Family who turned out to be manipulated by Vongola Primo's Mist Guardian, Demon Spade who intended to rebuild the Vongola that he desire. Later, Tsuna and the others participate in Representative Battle of the Rainbow under request from the Arcobaleno with the winner will be able to have his or her curse removed. However, things started to get worse once an Arcobaleno with a clear pacifier, Bermuda von Veckenschtein appears with his team and participate the Representative Battle in order to get his revenge on Checker Face at the cost of the Arcobaleno's lives.

== Kokuyo Gang ==
Members of the Kokuyo Gang (from left to right): Twins (Gigi/Didi), Ken Joshima, Mukuro Rokudo, Chikusa Kakimoto, M.M. and Lancia.

The Kokuyo Gang is a group led by Mukuro Rokudo, who formed the group after escaping from a special, high security jail in Italy which housed heinous criminals who have even committed crimes against the Mafia. Along with the two comrades he escaped with, Ken Joshima and Chikusa Kakimoto, he recruited other Mafia criminals who were able to break out from the same jail some time later. After their defeat at the hands of Tsuna and his friends, they were all once again imprisoned, though Chikusa and Ken are later able to escape, while Mukuro strikes a deal with the Vongola for their safety.

=== Mukuro Rokudo ===
Mukuro Rokudo (六道 骸, Rokudō Mukuro) is a 15-year-old Mafia criminal who escaped from an Italian prison, which held some of the most dangerous Mafia criminals, before he was to be executed. Not long after, he, along with his two subordinates, came to Japan, enrolled in Kokuyo Junior High, and started the Kokuyo Gang, which consists of heinous criminals who have recently escaped from prison. Skilled in casting illusions as well as mind control, he attempts to take his revenge on the Mafia by taking over Tsuna's body and using him to wreak havoc. When his plan fails due to Tsuna's interference, he is once again imprisoned. However, later on in the series, after possessing the body of Chrome Dokuro, he takes on a more supportive role for the series' main characters, though still prefers to not associate with them. He is voiced by Toshinobu Iida in the anime.

=== Ken Joshima ===
Ken Joshima (城島 犬, Jōshima Ken) is a 14-year-old loyal friend and follower of Mukuro. Born on July 28, he was also experimented on by the Estraneo Family, and decided to follow Mukuro when the boy killed their captors. The experimentation on him resulted in his ability to gain the attributes of certain animals, like wolves and lions, when he changes to different sets of teeth, increasing his agility, strength, and senses. He was Chikusa's cellmate in jail and often calls him "Kakipi". He is defeated by Takeshi Yamamoto and later defeated once again by an injured Kyoya Hibari. He is taken away by the Vendicare, but later escapes. Ken returns for the Vongola Tournament, serving as a bodyguard for Chrome Dokuro, whom he is fond of despite he often mocks and berates. He is voiced by Ryō Naitō in the anime.

=== Chikusa Kakimoto ===
Chikusa Kakimoto (柿本 千種, Kakimoto Chikusa) is a 14-year-old loyal friend and follower of Mukuro. Born on October 26, he, along with Mukuro and Ken, was experimented on by the Estraneo Family, and accepted Mukuro's offer to come with him when the latter killed their captors. He uses a pair of metal yo-yos that shoot poisonous needles as his primary weapons. After arriving in Namimori, he loses a battle against Hayato Gokudera, though finds out the identity of the tenth Vongola boss. Later, after sustaining further injuries by Kyoya Hibari, he is taken away and imprisoned by the Mafia's guardians, the Vendicare, along with the rest of the gang. He and Ken are able to successfully escape, with Mukuro ensuring their safety by striking a deal with Iemitsu Sawada. He returns for the Vongola Tournament, serving as a bodyguard for Chrome Dokuro, whose well-being is of concern to both him and Ken despite his open dislike for her. He is voiced by Toshiyuki Toyonaga in the anime.

=== Chrome Dokuro ===
Chrome Dokuro is a loyal 13-year-old vessel of Mukuro and one of the newest members of the gang. She is originally a girl named Nagi who was found by Mukuro when on the verge of death after her attempt to rescue a cat from traffic accident at the cost of her right eye and several of her organs. Mukuro allowed her to live by creating illusionary organs for her with his illusion, intertwining their existence. She became co-Mist Guardian of Vongola, fighting against Mammon in the Ring Conflict, which result on her lost until Mukuro switched place with her and defeats Mammon. A week after Mukuro's release from Vendicare prison, she was kicked out from the gang by Mukuro and begins living on her own in Namimori with Tsuna and his friends. The reason of her discard was revealed during the third day of Representative Battle; it was because of her own dilemma between wanting to be acknowledged as individual and wanting to keep living with Mukuro's illusionary organs, causing her health deteriorating. This left Mukuro no choice but to keep her at distance from him. However, she's able to overcome her dilemma and recreate her organs with her own power, defeating two Vindices with hers and Mukuro's combined power. As she and Mukuro shared one body, she's able to use two of Mukuro's six skills. However, once Mukuro was freed from Vendicare Prison, she can no longer use this ability. She used to use the same trident like Mukuro as her main weapon, but after Mukuro was released, the spikes of her trident reduced to one. She is voiced by Satomi Akesaka in the Anime.

=== M.M. ===
M.M. (エム・エム, Emu Emu) is a 15-year-old Mafia criminal who broke out of prison after Mukuro escaped. Born on July 3. She believes that money is the most important thing. After her defeat at the hands of Bianchi, she is later taken away by the Vendicare, but later rejoined the gang after Mukuro is released from prison. Her weapon is a clarinet that is constructed like a microwave oven. When played, the clarinet creates special sound waves that cause atoms to vibrate at an incredible rate which results in the substance the clarinet is aimed at to boil instantly. She calls the attack Burning Vibrato. When in close range combat, her clarinet splits, becoming a pair of nunchaku. She is voiced by Shōko Ishii in the anime.

=== Lancia ===
Lancia (ランチア, Ranchia) is a 25-year-old Mafia criminal initially mistaken as Mukuro Rokudo. Born on December 15, as a child, he was adopted by the leader of a Mafia family in Northern Italy. The same family would later take in a young Mukuro, who periodically mind controls Lancia, and even makes him slay his entire family. Lancia eventually falls under Mukuro's complete control, losing his will to fight and forgetting his own name, and is soon captured and jailed. After Tsuna defeats him and Mukuro, he is freed from the latter's control, and is taken away by the Vendicare. He returns to Japan during the Vongola Tournament, defeating most members of the Varia's lower members, and being revealed as the strongest person in Northern Italy. Apparently, he became sensitive to Mukuro's thoughts due to being possessed by him so many times. He leaves for Italy after giving Tsuna his own family's ring. Lancia uses a giant steel ball and chain as his primary weapon, which he launches at the enemy using palm thrusts. Due to the ball's snake-like engravings on the surface, it can track and redirect air currents that create a vortex, sucking in whatever is near, and allowing Lancia to change its rotation in mid-air. He is voiced by Takeshi Maeda in the anime.

=== Birds ===
Birds is one of dangerous criminals that assisted Mukuro on finding Tsuna. He is accompanied by yellow birds that always followed him around and double as a signal to Mukuro if he was defeated. He is an old man who finds pleasure in suffering of others, as he has nosebleeds when he ordering Tsuna's friends to beat him up. He ordered the Bloody Twins to follow Kyoko and Haru and threatened Tsuna and his friends that they will kill them if they didn't listen to what he said. However, his plan was foiled due to Shamal, Future Lambo and I-Pin's interference, resulting with his defeat and he was later arrested. He was voiced by Takahiro Hirano in the anime.

=== Bloody Twins ===
Gigi and Didi are a pair of brutal serial killers that loyal to Birds. They are ones of criminals that Mukuro had freed along with him, becoming part of Kokuyo Gang members. They are used as a blackmail, following Kyoko and Haru and threatened to kill them if Tsuna and his friends don't listen to Birds' order. However, they were defeated by Shamal and Future I-Pin who have been asked by Reborn to act as the two girls' bodyguards. They were arrested along with the other members afterwards.

== The Varia ==
The Varia (from top to bottom): Gola Moska, Levi, Mammon, Xanxus, Lussuria, Squalo, and Bel.

The Varia is the Vongola Family's elite, independent assassination team. They are composed of genius assassins who work in the deepest recesses of the Mafia. Each member takes on missions that are said to be impossible to accomplish by humans, however, they do not accept a mission unless they believe there is a 90% chance of success. Those that see them work often say that their high level assassination skills are demonic. Despite lacking loyalty and respect for other members, they are extremely loyal to their leader, Xanxus. The Varia also appear to have more than fifty subordinates ranged under the command of the main members. The Varia is apparently reclusive, only showing themselves after Iemitsu Sawada disappeared.

During the alternate future arc, a 32-member Varia squad led by Xanxus attack a Millefiore base in Italy in accordance with the Vongola's plan to eliminate the Millefiore. Despite their fierce loyalty to the Vongola Family, the Varia only consider themselves as the Vongola IX's assassination team, still not acknowledging Tsuna to be the rightful Vongola X.

=== Xanxus ===
Xanxus (ザンザス, Zanzasu) is the leader of the Varia and adopted son of the Vongola IX. For a long time, his mother convinced him that he was the son of Timoteo, Vongola IX, but after discovering that he was adopted, Xanxus develops a bitter hatred towards him. His anger only grew after discovering that him being outside the Vongola bloodline exempts him from claiming the title of Vongola boss, and that Tsuna was going to be appointed as the next boss instead. This inspires Xanxus to stage a coup d'etat, which came to be known as the "Cradle Affair", and is defeated by the IX. The incident left him with his trademark burns, and was frozen in ice for many years. After he awakens, he kidnaps the IX, places him within Gola Moska's armor, and uses the Vongola Tournament as a means to eliminate Tsuna's guardians and take control of the Vongola. His campaign comes to an end after being defeated by Tsuna, and the Vongola Rings rejecting him for not possessing Vongola blood. In the future, during the attack on the Millefiore, he defeats Sil and Olgelt with his animal box weapon containing a liger that possesses the Sky and Storm Flames. Xanxus possesses exemplary human strength and mental fortitude, but also possesses a particularly rare and destructive Deathperation Flame called the "Flame of Rage", which were once wielded by Vongola II. Xanxus also owns two guns, and can compress his flame into its bullets, utilizing the skill originally developed by Vongola VII to amplify their penetrative and destructive capability. He also grows in power from uncontrollable rage when his defeat by Tsuna is mentioned. He is voiced by Masanori Ikeda in the anime.

=== Superbia Squalo ===
Superbia Squalo (スペルビ スクアーロ, Superubi Sukuāro) is a gifted swordsman extremely loyal to Xanxus and also Dino's schoolmate from childhood. Squalo was actually the next candidate for Varia leadership, after defeating its leader Tyr. He had cut off his own left hand to better understand Tyr, who did not have a left hand. As such, Squalo has an artificial hand in its place which can flip into very severe angles, as to make up for his blind spots in sword-fighting. He submitted to Xanxus due to his "fury" and ambition, pledging to make Xanxus the next head of the Vongola Family. He battles and loses to Takeshi Yamamoto during the Vongola Tournament, and though he appears to be eaten by a shark, he had apparently been rescued by Dino in order to get Squalo to reveal information on Xanxus.

In the future, Squalo and Belphegor appears in an encoded video for Tsuna and his family, warning them not to move from their current location and that instructions will be arriving shortly. In videos he sent to the adult Yamamoto for boasting rights and also as a way to draw the latter back to the sword, Squalo is shown to have continuously fought 101 battles in order to secure his title as the "Second Sword Emperor". He is later shown to be the battle commander during the attack against the Millefiore base in Italy. He wields Rain-Class flames and his special box unleashes a shark. He is voiced by Hiroki Takahashi in the anime.

=== Belphegor ===
Belphegor (ベルフェゴール, Berufegōru), Belphegor is an assassin working for the Vongola's independent assassination squad, the Varia. He is known as "Prince the Ripper" (Purinzu za Rippa). Once a prince of an unknown country, at the age of eight, he stabbed his identical twin brother, Rasiel, presumably to death. It was later revealed during the Future Arc although he did stab his brother Rasiel, Rasiel still lived. Bel has a crescent-shaped birthmark on the right side of his stomach which mirrors Rasiel's. He is known as a battle genius, but his abilities only truly present themselves when he sees his own "royal" blood, which reminds him of the time he stabbed his brother. His eyes are never shown, but in Volume 24, Lussuria says in his interview that his eyes are both cool and loyal. In the future, during the Varia raid on a Millefiore base, he unleashes a storm-attribute mink from his special box. He is nicknamed Bel or Prince the Ripper. He is voiced by Yūki Fujiwara in the anime.

=== Lussuria ===
Lussuria (ルッスーリア, Russūria) is a martial arts master whose favored style is Muay Thai. His knee is covered with a steel plate, making it ideal for defense, as well as deadly when used for offense. During the Vongola Tournament, he battles Ryohei in a brightly lit boxing ring, and initially has the advantage as he habitually wears sunglasses. After Ryohei destroys the lights and shatters his knee plate, the rest of the Varia assume his loss, and Gola Moska shoots him in the back, making him unable to continue the fight. Lussuria reappears during the tournament's final battle and is saved by Ryohei. In the future, along with retaining his combat abilities, he uses a special box that can unleash a sun-based peacock that can heal wounds while also accelerating a person's hair and nail growth. He is voiced by Kōichirō Yuzawa in the anime.

=== Levi A Than ===
Levi A Than (レヴィ・ア・タン, Revi A Tan), known as 'Levi' for short, is an extremely loyal subordinate to Xanxus who cares little about promotions. It is said that his speed in accomplishing his work is the best in the Varia. He carries eight umbrellas which are each capable of discharging electricity. He battles Lambo during the Vongola Tournament, and though he had no problem defeating the 5 and 15-year-old Lambos, he is easily outmatched by the 25-year-old Lambo. After Lambo reverts to his 5-year-old self, Levi prepares to deliver the final blow to the unconscious Lambo, but Tsuna's intervention disqualifies Lambo. During the tournament's final battle, he is defeated by Gokudera. In the future, he is shown to unleash a lightning-based stingray from his special box during the raid on the Millefiore base. He is voiced by Yuto Nakano in the anime.

=== Mammon (Viper) ===
Mammon (マーモン, Māmon) is an Arcobaleno whose real name is Viper. He owns the mist pacifier. Known as the Arcobaleno's best spellcaster, Viper has the ability to cast illusions, as well as being able to locate any person by sneezing into a piece of paper; the spit or mucus that sticks to the paper shows a map leading to the desired person. He also has a black frog named Fantasma that can give him the ability to fly in combat when it turns into a salamander. During the Vongola Tournament, he defeats Chrome, however, he is defeated by Mukuro once the latter takes possession of Chrome's body. He is said to be dead in the future, thus his position in the Varia has been replaced by Fran, who unwillingly wears a frog hat as homage. He is voiced by Rumi Shishido in the anime.

=== Gola Moska ===
Gola Moska (ゴーラ•モスカ, Gōra Mosuka) is a killing machine sold to the Varia on the black market by the Italian government, and is powered by the life of a human. It battles Hibari during the Vongola Tournament, but it is easily defeated with one strike. After it goes berserk, Tsuna destroys it by slicing it in half, revealing that Vongola IX has been unwillingly powering it.

=== Fran ===
Fran (フラン, Fūran) is Mukuro's disciple and the newest officer member of the Varia in the future who uses a Hell Ring with the numbers "666" imprinted on it. Introduced during the Varia attack on a Millefiore base in Italy, Fran is Mammon's replacement as the group's illusionist and is thus forced to wear a large frog hat to symbolize this. He is usually the target of Belphegors knives due to constant mocking. Although generally calm, Fran is openly antagonistic to the other Varia members on many occasions, mocking and verbally attacking them as they work. He later helps the Kokuyo Gang in freeing Mukuro Rokudo, his master, from his imprisonment. During the Representative Battle of the Rainbow, he was recruited and joined Mukuro's team. He is voiced by Kokuryu Sachi in the anime.

== Millefiore Family ==
The Millefiore Family (ミルフィオーレファミリー, Mirufiōre Famirī) is the Mafia family that is engaged in battle against the Vongola Family in the future. The Millefiore is a result of the merging of two separate Mafia families: the up-and-coming Gesso (ジェッソ, Jesso) Family led by Byakuran, and the family with as much history as the Vongola, the Giglio Nero (ジッリョネロ, Jirryo Nero) led by Uni. They are organized into two groups to distinguish their old families, which are then further separated into 18 different squads, each named for a plant or flower. Those originally from the Giglio Nero are the Black Spell and have the tendency to engage in direct combat, while those from the Gesso are the White Spell and specialize in cunning battle tactics. There appears to be animosity between members of the White Spell and the Black Spell, resulting in a lack of communication and sabotage by individual squads. Their organization also possesses the Mare Rings, a set of seven rings on par with the Vongola Rings originally belonging solely to the Giglio Nero. The holders of which, save the holder of the Sky, are known as the six Funeral Wreaths.

=== Byakuran ===
Byakuran (白蘭, Byakuran) is the former boss of the Gesso Family, and the incumbent leader of the Millefiore Family whose aim is to obtain "ultimate power" Trinisette (7³) by gathering the Vongola Rings, Mare Rings, and Arcobaleno pacifiers together in one place; he has a portrait that has a slot for each item. To achieve his goals, Byakuran has ordered the complete extermination of the Vongola Family, even targeting their friends and allies. He also had special radiation released into the atmosphere in order to specifically kill all Arcobaleno members. Though he possesses the Sky Mare Ring, he has purposefully hidden his true abilities, and maintains a carefree attitude, even during his fight with Mukuro Rokudo, whom he critically injures. Despite his ruthlessness toward his enemies, he has a cheerful disposition when around his subordinates, especially toward Shoichi Irie, despite knowing of the latter's betrayal. According to Irie, Byakuran's power is the ability to share thoughts and experiences with versions of himself in all possible parallel worlds, giving him a power similar to omniscience, the ability to know everything. Byakuran's realization of his abilities was brought about when a young Irie continuously time-traveled into different futures and came in contact with two versions of Byakuran. His other selves have used this ability to become the dictator of their world, with the world the story is set in being the only one where he is not. However, his power is also weakening over time, which is why he needs Uni, to replenish his abilities but in the end he is defeated and incinerated by Tsuna's flames. During Tsuna's original time, Byakuran is shown to be different from his future counterpart, healing Yamamoto's wounds, expressing his desire to protect Uni out of sincerity, and assist Tsuna to defeat Team Bermuda, showing that he has truly becoming their ally. He is voiced by Takanori Ohyama in the anime.

=== Uni ===
Uni (ユニ, Yuni) is a young girl who is the former leader of the Giglio Nero Family as a result of the early death of her mother, Aria, whom she did not know was a Mafia boss. She is known to be the daughter of Aria and the granddaughter of Luce, the original Sky Arcobaleno. She also inherited the orange Arcobaleno pacifier from her grandmother. Known as the "princess", Uni was originally kindhearted and warm, and in order to prevent all out war with the Gesso Family, she started negotiations with their leader Byakuran. However, the latter forcefully drugged her during their private meeting. In addition to becoming cold and emotionally detached, the drug made her unable to speak up against Byakuran, resulting in the merger of their two families. She later regains her original personality, stating that she too has the power to travel to different worlds. When Byakuran denies her request for the Six Funeral Wreaths to have a rematch with the Vongola Guardians, she withdraws from the Millefiore Family and requests for Tsuna to protect her. She shows that she also has the other Arcobaleno pacifiers. According to Reborn, she is the Arcobaleno's boss. In the final battle with Byakuran, before he can complete the Trinisette, Uni, along with Gamma, sacrifices herself in order to revive the Arcobaleno. During the Representative Battle of the Rainbow, the present Uni once again becomes Arcobaleno, inheriting the title from her mother who decided to retire so Uni will get the chance to be freed from her curse. She is now on friendly terms with Byakuran. She is voiced by Yoshino Nanjō in the anime.

=== Shoichi Irie ===
Shoichi Irie (入江 正一, Irie Shōichi) is initially an unsuspecting Japanese middle school kid who becomes caught up in the antics concerning Tsuna and his friends early on in the series, and ends up in possession of some Bovino family weaponry, including the Ten-Year Bazooka. However, in the story's alternate future story arc nearly ten years later, he is thought to be an enemy working for the Millefiore Family, but is in fact a spy for the Vongola. He is the captain of the White Spell's 2nd Rose Squad, and is also one of the Millefiore's six A rank members. He reports directly to Byakuran, and has been secretly researching the Ten-Year Bazooka in order to find a way to time travel. After confronting Tsuna and his friends, he reveals that he is on their side, with his past self being the one who has been bringing them into the future with the Ten-Year Bazooka, in accordance with a strategy that he, and adult Tsuna and Hibari have been planning. In the tournament against the Six Funeral Wreaths, he explains to Tsuna and the others of how his continuous attempts to change his future resulted in Byakuran realizing his powers; when a young Irie had time-traveled into the future twice, he had bumped into two versions of Byakuran, with the latter one remembering who Irie was despite never having bumped into him before (in that universe at least). Despite Irie's attempts to the change the future, his following trips all resulted in him seeing a ravaged world in which Byakuran was the dictator of the world. He is voiced by Toshiyuki Toyonaga in the anime.

=== Gamma ===
Gamma is an A ranked member of the Millefiore Family, who commands the 3rd attack squad of the Black Spell. According to Lal Mirch, Gamma is responsible for wiping out many of the allies of the Vongola Family. Gamma defeats Hayato Gokudera and Takeshi Yamamoto later interrogating Gokudera. Before Gamma killed them however, Kyoya Hibari arrived and defeated him. When Tsuna's group infiltrates their base, he runs into Gokudera and Ryohei. It is evident that he received a substantial power boost and succeeds defeating Ryohei. He and Gokudera then fight to a stalemate. He later returns to protect Uni from the Real Six Funeral Wreathes and later both of them sacrifice themselves so the Arcobaleno can be reborn. It is revealed that Gamma has a deep hatred of Byakuran and members of the White Spell, believing that the former did something to Uni that caused her to become who she is now. Gamma is the wielder of the Lightning Mare Ring that is later revealed to be a fake, and can use his lightning attribute flame to hover in the air as well as create electromagnetic barrier that can defend against attacks. He carries a billiard cue and a series of electrically charged billiard balls. Gamma also uses an animal box weapon, in the form of two foxes made of lightning, which can be enhanced using a third box. He is voiced by Kazuhiko Inoue in the anime.

=== Genkishi ===
Genkishi (幻騎士), also known as the "Phantom Knight", is a Millefiore illusionist and swordsman, carrying four swords, as well as the Mist Mare Ring that is later revealed to be a fake and one of the six Hell Rings. He is sent to Japan by Byakuran in order to protect Shoichi Irie, so during the Vongola's raid on their base, he defeats Yamamoto and battles adult Hibari until the latter is replaced with their past self. It is revealed that despite being a former Giglio Nero member, he devoted himself to following Byakuran when he saved him from an incurable disease, and had even instigated the Giglio Nero/Gesso merger by faking his defeat at the hands of Squalo. However, when Byakuran had requested him to steal the Mare Rings and Sky Pacifier from the Giglio Nero, he was unable to do so due to Uni. This leads him to go to great lengths to prove his loyalty to Byakuran, even being consumed by his Hell Ring, which changes him physically and mentally, in order to defeat Tsuna in battle. Though his transformation grants him greater power, he loses to Tsuna and escapes by using one of his box weapons. He resurfaces during the Vongolas' battle with the Six Funeral Wreaths disguised as Saru, one of Torikabuto's subordinate. There, he is defeated in a rematch with Yamamoto and killed off by Kikyo, under orders of Byakuran. He is voiced by Daisuke Hosomi in the anime.

=== Glo Xinia ===
Glo Xinia (グロ・キシニア, Guro・Kishinia) is a captain of the White Spell's 8th Wisteria squad and is the holder of the Rain Mare Ring that is later revealed to be a fake. He encountered the younger Chrome Dokuro. He fights with a box of the rain element, an owl covered in the Dying Will Flame, later revealed to be playing host to Mukuro. After his battle with Chrome he was hospitalized with severe injuries and a broken jaw, but it is later discovered that he planted a tracking device on Chrome. He is voiced by Yoshihisa Kawahara in the anime.

=== Rasiel ===
Sil (ジル, Jiru) is Belphegor's older twin brother and possesses the Storm Mare Ring that is later revealed to be a fake. He and Bel fought constantly as children, but he always won, so to beat him, Bel put laxatives in Sil's food to incapacitate him. Originally thought to have been killed by Bel, Sil reveals himself as the one responsible for the Millefiore defense in Italy, and uses a box weapon containing multiple bats that emit invisible storm flames to assault his enemies in battle. His personality is no different from Bel's, except that he states that he is a king rather than a prince. He is accompanied by his family's former butler, Olgelt, who claims to only follow the one who would be king and can unleash elephants from multiple boxes. He is voiced by Ryuji Kamiyama in the anime.

=== Ginger Bread ===
Though primarily known as Ginger Bread (ジンジャー・ブレッド, Jinjā Bureddo) within the story, he claims that he no longer goes by that name. He is also known as the Magician's Doll, primarily due to his usage of similar looking dolls that are clothed in a wizard's hat and cape, and have stars in their eyes, to fight. In addition, he uses spiders, summoned by what he calls sorcery. He is the vice-captain of the Millefiore's eighth squad, and claims to have had a hand in the death of Colonnello. As such, Lal Mirch engages him in battle, but after he loses, it is revealed that she was only fighting one of his dolls. Another one of his dolls, paired with another Millefiore member, Iris Yoka, and her Death Stalk squad, shows up soon after to incapacitate Tsuna and Spanner, but it is then defeated by the former. Later, it's revealed that he's actually dolls created by a Vindice, Alejandro to destroy families from within. He is voiced by Yumiko Kobayashi in the anime.

=== Spanner ===
Spanner (酢花, Supana) is a member of the Black Spell. He belongs to the family's tech department and is responsible for the creation of the family's Moska robots, which are giant humanoid robots created for combat. He was told by Irie to locate and eliminate Tsuna. After Tsuna defeats King Moska, Spanner takes the unconscious Tsuna back to his workroom where he manages to perfect Tsuna's X Burner, as he wished to see its full power. He does so by inventing a pair of contact lens for Tsuna that allows him to regulate the power output level of each glove while using the X Burner. He is considered to be a traitor to the Millefiore and joins Tsuna's family. He later takes part in the tournament against the Six Funeral Wreaths. He is voiced by Kenjiro Tsuda in the anime.

=== Real 6 Funeral Wreaths ===
Byakuran with the Real 6 Funeral Wreaths excluding Ghost (from left to right): Deisy, Zakuro, Byakuran, Kikyo, Bluebell, and Torikabuto.

The Real 6 Funeral Wreaths (真6弔花, Ma 6 Chō Hana) are Byakuran's six strongest subordinates, and are thus in possession of the Mare Rings, the Millefiore's top class rings that are said to be on par with the power of the Vongola Rings, and are a corner of the Trinisette policy. At first, it was thought that Shoichi Irie, Gamma, Genkishi, Glo Xinia, and Rasiel were part of the six as they supposedly possessed Mare Rings, but Byakuran reveals that the rings that they possess are fake; he hid the true identities of the real Funeral Wreaths as he suspected Shoichi's betrayal. The known members are Zakuro (ザクロ), the rough-looking Storm Funeral Wreath, his Carnage Box transforms him into part T-Rex; Kikyo (桔梗, Kikyō), (voiced by Kazuki Kato in the anime) the ruthless Cloud Funeral Wreath and leader of the real Funeral Wreaths; his Carnage Box transforms him into part-Spinosaurus; Deisy (デイジー, Deijī), the Millefiore's immortal sun guardian who possesses facial scars and is apparently obsessed with slaughter, his Carnage Box transforms him into part-lizard; Bluebell (ブルーベル, Burūberu), a young girl who is the Rain Funeral Wreath and is able to dissolve into water, her Carnage Box transforms her into part-Shonisaurus; Torikabuto (トリカブト), the Mist Funeral Wreath and a colossal figure who utilizes multiple flame elements and illusions in battle, his Carnage Box transforms him into a disgusting merge of human and moth; and Ghost (ゴースト, Gōsuto), the Lightning Funeral Wreath who is in fact a parallel double of Byakuran himself, able to absorb flames from nearby sources due to his unique composition. All of the members (excluding Ghost) shown so far have displayed a number of shared traits: they use box weapons containing prehistoric beings such as dinosaurs as opposed to regular animals, they have their box weapons embedded in their bodies to maximize their fighting ability, and they use their Dying Will flames as projectiles in combat when their box weapons are dormant. An interesting point about Bluebell and Zakuro is that their hair colour matches their flame colour.

== Simon Family ==
The Simon Family (from left to right): Kaoru Mizuno, Julie Kato, Shitt.P, and Large Ooyama (second row). Adelheid Suzuki, Enma Kozato, and Kouyou Aoba.

The Simon Family is a Mafia group that has been allies with the Vongola since Giotto's time, but has grown weak over the years. Seven of its members transfer into Namimori Middle School in order to attend Tsuna's inheritance ceremony. These members are Shitt P., Adelheid Suzuki, Kaoru Mizuno, Large Ooyama, Kouyou Aoba, Julie Kato, and the tenth Simon boss, Enma Kozato. Their true motive is to take revenge on the Vongola, who supposedly betrayed the Simon Family during the first generations' time. Their power comes from the Simon Rings, which are fully activated by Vongola's Sin, a vial which is said to contain the blood of the first Simon boss, Simon Cozzato. Their rings use Flames of the Earth as opposed to Vongola's Flames of the Sky. Tsuna and his friends face the Simon in battles which they stake their pride and the loser is imprisoned in Vindice forever. It is later revealed that the Simon Family was being manipulated by Vongola Primo's Mist Guardian, Demon Spade, who plans to take possession of Mukuro Rokudo's body and rebuild the Vongola family in his image. After Demon was defeated, Simon Family reconciled their bond with Vongola.

=== Enma Kozato ===
Enma Kozato (古里 炎真, Kozato Enma) is the leader of the Simon Family and a descendant of the first Simon boss, Simon Cozzato. When he is introduced, he is shown as a similarly pathetic young boy to Tsuna. Enma had some concerns about whether to go through with the plan to overthrow Vongola, but eventually decides to do so after Tsuna unknowingly fails a test he had set up. After throwing away his concerns, they attack the Vongola Inheritance Ceremony and steals Vongola's Sin, using it to enhance their Simon Rings and destroy the Vongola Rings. Aside from the Simon's pride, he has a personal grudge against Tsuna since his parents and sister were apparently killed by Tsuna's father, Iemitsu. He is brought to insanity due to Demon Spade's manipulation, but he is saved by Tsuna who gets through to him. Despite being declared the loser by Vindice, he is allowed to stay to watch the final battle between Demon Spade and Mukuro Rokudo. After the final battle with Demon, he and his Family peacefully live their normal lives along with Tsuna and his Family in Namimori. His Simon Ring gives him the ability to control gravity, allowing him to produce powerful black holes. In Reborn! VOMIC, he is voiced by Kōki Uchiyama.

=== Kouyou Aoba ===
Kouyou Aoba (青葉 紅葉, Aoba Kōyō) is the Simon Guardian of the Forest. He has incredible vision which allows him to pinpoint flowing weak points in his opponent's body and exploit them. However, this vision causes great stress which can eventually lead to blindness, so he usually wears a special pair of pitch-black glasses. He battles against Ryohei in a boxing match which ends in a tie, and both he and Ryohei are imprisoned by Vindice. After final battle against Demon, he, and the other Simon Guardians are freed and reconciled with Vongola. He possesses similar traits to Ryohei and even has a catchphrase, which is, "in the end". In Reborn! VOMIC, he is voiced by Ryōhei Kimura.

=== Large Ooyama ===
Large Ooyama (大山 らうじ, Ōyama Rauji) is the Simon Guardian of the Mountain who gives off the impression of liking kids, not minding Lambo bossing him around all the time. In the battle against Vongola, he's shown to be ruthless towards Lambo and even challenged the child to a sumo match, though he was defeated by 15 year-old Lambo and imprisoned by Vindice. Large claims to follow Enma because he has strong eyes. After the final battle against Demon, he, and the imprisoned Simon Guardians are freed from the Vindice and he reconciled with Lambo. His Simon Ring forms volcanic rocks which form horns like a stag beetle that anchor his legs to the ground.

=== Adelheid Suzuki ===
Adelheid Suzuki (鈴木 アーデルハイト, Suzuki Ādoruhaito) is the Simon Guardian of the Glacier who has a no-nonsense demeanor and uses metal fans as weapons. She is deeply devoted to Enma and the Simon. Adelheid was head of the Liquidation Committee in Simon Middle School, and fights with Hibari after she decides that the order of the Disciplinary Committee is no longer needed and that her Liquidation Committee should replace it. She later loses to him during a duel on the Simon Island. After the final battle against Demon, she, and the other Simon Guardians are freed and she later continue her role as the head of Liquidation Committee in Namimori Middle School. Like Hibari, Adelheid uses force to get what she wants. Her Simon Ring allows her to freeze massive bodies of water. In Reborn! VOMIC, she is voiced by Aira Yūki.

=== Shitt P. ===
Shitt P. (シット・ピー, Shittopī) is the Simon Guardian of the Swamp. She has a single patch of hair on her forehead and is always seen wearing two large inflatable rings around herself, prompting Gokudera to label her an "UMA" (Unidentified Mysterious Animal). Her pride is fighting for herself, and she mocks Gokudera's dedication to Tsuna on the basis of Tsuna's poor academic and athletic abilities. Her ring flames allow her to break down any inorganic substance into a swamp-like pit. She challenges Gokudera into a battle in which they must pop the other person's balloons. Gokudera ends up as the winner leaving her to be taken away. After the final battle against Demon, she, and the other Simon Guardians are freed and reconciled with Vongola. She developed fondness for Gokudera and began to stalk him ever since, much to Gokudera's dismay. In Reborn! VOMIC, she is voiced by Lyrian.

=== Kaoru Mizuno ===
Kaoru Mizuno (水野 薫, Mizuno Kaoru) is a Simon Guardian who sports a pompadour. He is initially shown to be a shy person interested in sports. However, upon Yamamoto's discovery of his ring wrapped in paper with the Vongola emblem crossed out, he attacked Yamamoto, resulting in Yamamoto getting hospitalized. When he later learns of Demon Spade's manipulation of the Simon family, he battles against him but is easily outmatched and imprisoned along with Adelheid because he no longer has any capability to fight the Vongola. After the final battle against Demon, he, and the other Simon Guardians are freed, and he reconciled with Yamamoto. His Simon Ring allows him to form a powerful drill around his arm. In Reborn! VOMIC, he is voiced by Kōhei Kurihara.

=== Julie Kato ===
Julie Kato (加藤ジュリー, Katō Jurī) is the Simon Guardian of the Desert, who takes a keen interest in Chrome and constantly pushes Enma's to carry out the fight. In reality, he is actually possessed by Vongola Primo's Mist Guardian. After Demon seemingly defeated by Mukuro, Julie was freed from Demon's possession without any memories of what are happening. He was sent to the illusionary world along with Gokudera, Yamamoto, Lambo, and Hibari by Demon and was trapped there until Tsuna defeated Demon. After the final battle against Demon, he and his Family lives peacefully with Vongola. In Reborn! VOMIC, he is voiced by Makoto Ōzaki.

== Individual ==
=== Demon Spade ===
Demon Spade.

Demon Spade (D・スペード, Deimon Supēdo) is the Vongola Primo's Mist Guardian. He used to be an aristocrat who hated his own status due to the corruption within nobility. He joined Vongola after his lover, Elena, introduced him to Vongola Primo and dedicated himself to the Family. However, after Elena's death due to Primo's reckless decision to throw away his military forces, leaving Vongola territory open to attack, Demon changed and decided to make Vongola a Family that everyone feared to prevent the same thing from happening again. He betrayed Primo since he believed that the latter was no longer capable being the boss, deeming him far too soft. He set a trap for Simon Cozzato in the past and using Julie Kato's body, arranged the present battle between Vongola and Simon so he could destroy the Vongola and rebuild it in his image. During Tsuna's inheritance ceremony, he kidnapped Chrome and controlled her mind in order to lure out Mukuro so he could take over his body. Though he is seemingly defeated by Mukuro, Demon turned out to be using the opportunity to possess Mukuro's soulless body in the Vindice's prison before Mukuro did.

In the final battle with Tsuna, he was defeated by Tsuna who had acquired Flame of Oath, mortally wounding him in the process. As he was dying, he dropped his pocket watch that picked up by Tsuna, revealing it contains old photograph of himself with the Vongola Primo Family and Elena. At this time he finally revealed his past and his motives behind his entire action for all those years; all for Elena's sake. After knowing this, Tsuna, not wanting Demon to die while still bearing hatred and regret, lied that he understand through his Hyper Intuition that Elena is grateful and knew that he'd never forgot her, making Demon whole-heartedly accept his fate despite knowing that Tsuna was lying. Afterwards, he dies, finally at peace as he accepted Tsuna and his Family, entrusting Vongola in their hands.

By acquiring Mukuro's body, he obtained all the six Simon Earth rings, excluding Enma's that allows him to use all the abilities of the Simon family along with the special eight attribute Flame, Flame of Night that Vendice use that far exceeding his previous power to the point where Mukuro stated that he's no longer a human but a monster. In the anime, Demon was voiced by Atsushi Kousaka.

== Vindice ==
Vindice are the masked keepers of Mafia law who punish those who cannot be judge by normal law. Those who defy their law are arrested without any hesitation and imprisoned in inescapable prison known as the Vindice Prison. The Vindice has been around for as long as the Mafia exist. Their reputation among Mafia world precedes them, as they are said to show no mercy even to devils. They are said to have no emotions other than hatred. They possesses the Flame of Night that governs by a set of law that allows them to transport anywhere they want. The Vindice are revealed to be the previous Arcobaleno who were in the past, tricked and cursed by Checker Face. They, who had their Pacifier removed from them were mostly dead and even the ones who managed to survive had a cursed lives afterwards that only desiring for revenge, making them the way they are now. All the Vindice, aside from Bermuda, are unable to create their own flames and merely survived by the flames provided by Bermuda. After they were defeated by Tsuna and his friends, they agreed to protect the Tri-ni-set for eternity that had been place in jars specifically created by Talbot with Bermuda's Flame of Night as support to prevent another generations of Arcobaleno.

=== Bermuda von Veckenschtein ===
A mysterious Arcobaleno and the founder of Vindice organization with clear pacifier who first appeared alongside Jager in front of Giotto, Simon Cozzato, and G., becoming focal point of the oath made by both Giotto and Cozzato. He later reappeared alongside seven Vindices at the second day of Representative Battle and officially participate the battle after defeating Team Skull and steal their watches with his team. He is said to be once the absolute strongest Arcobaleno until certain incident and due to a little blunder, he is under the same curse as the other Arcobaleno. Like other Vindice, he was an Arcobaleno who was tricked and cursed by Checker Face. However, when Checker Face tried to remove his flame from his pacifier, Bermuda resisted and able to survive by filling his pacifier with a new flame, Flame of Night and through generations, recruiting those who experience the same fate as him and taught them how to use the flame. He created the Vindice in order to keep watch the Tri-ni-set in hope he able to track Checker Face who administrates it. He plans to kill Checker Face to achieve his revenge by winning the Representative Battle, at cost of the Vindice and the current Arcobaleno's lives. After defeated by Tsuna, he and the Vindice agreed to protect the Tri-ni-set with his flames to take control over it, away from Checker Face, as well as in order to prevent another generation Arcobaleno to be born ever again. Being the founder of the Flame of Night and formerly the strongest Arcobaleno, Bermuda is a powerful fighter with the ability to short warp an infinite number of times, strong enough to corner Reborn in his adult form.

=== Jager ===
Bermuda's partner who always appeared alongside the latter. He also witnessed the oath made by Giotto and Cozzato. He reappeared again when Demon able to break out from Vendice water prison and promised both Tsuna and Enma that he will free Ryohei and Simon Guardians who were imprisoned in their prison if they able to defeat Demon. During the Representative of the Rainbow, he and his team joined the battle as Bermuda's Representative with him as the Boss. According to Bermuda, he is the strongest Vindice warrior, able to overpower Tsuna in a matter of seconds as well as Squalo, Xanxus, and Byakuran. Even Reborn himself made it clear that Tsuna won't stand a chance against him and couldn't see any possibility for him to win against him in any way. During the fourth day of Representative Battle, however, he was defeated by Tsuna and his remaining team members' cooperation.

=== Jack ===
One of the Vindice who partake the Representative Battle of the Rainbow as part of Team Bermuda. During the third day of Representative Battle, he appears with other two Vindices in front of Tsuna's and Mukuro's team, which resulting a temporary alliance between the two. During the battle, he was the one who indicated that they are not human being. He is defeated by Tsuna shortly after his other two teammates were defeated by Mukuro and Chrome.

=== Alejandro ===
One of the Vindice who partake the Representative Battle of the Rainbow as part of Team Bermuda. He has been in Vindice almost around the same time as Bermuda. During his fight with Tsuna, Enma, and Basil, it's revealed that he's the creator of Ginger Bread puppets to destroy Families from within, referring them as his children. His battler watch was destroyed by Tsuna after his attention was distracted when witnessing his Ginger Bread puppets' defeat by Tsuna, Enma, and Basil's combination, disqualifying him from the Representative Battle.

=== Small Gia ===
One of the Vindice who partake the Representative Battle of the Rainbow as part of Team Bermuda. He, along with Big Pino ambushed Team Verde's decoy puppets and then fought illusions created by Chrome and Flan with Gokudera and Yamamoto mixed among them to buy times until Tsuna, Enma, and Basil arrives. He was able to locate Chrome's and Flan's illusions and almost had Big Pino kill them, but Tsuna, Enma, and Basil arrive in time to save them. He uses weapons that carried by Big Pino and able to switch them whenever he wanted. Unlike other Vindice in common, he's rather expressive, showing clearly his joy and emotions even though Jager has once said that Vindice has no emotion other than hatred. He is also sadistic, stating that his hobby is slaughtering. He seemed to be the only one able to understand Big Pino's words. He and Big Pino was defeated when Yamamoto restrained him while his movements were stopped by Enma's manipulation and Chrome and Flan protected him and Gokudera with their illusions right before the dynamites that Yamamoto was holding explode, destroying his battler watch.

=== Big Pino ===
One of the Vindice who partake the Representative Battle of the Rainbow as part of Team Bermuda. He, along with Small Gia ambushed Team Verde's decoy puppets and then fought illusions created by Chrome and Flan with Gokudera and Yamamoto mixed among them to buy times until Tsuna, Enma, and Basil arrives. He's powerful enough to destroy Gokudera's Sistema C.A.I and Yamamoto's swords, and nearly killed them if only Tsuna, Enma, and Basil didn't arrive on time to stop them. Aside from his cannon, he carries various weapons with him behind his coat that used by Small Gia. Unlike other Vindice, he's unable to talk and can only say "pipipupo" that only Small Gia could understand. He and Small Gia was defeated when Gokudera distracts and able to reach his arm near enough to his battler watch while Enma stopped his movements and Chrome and Flan protected him and Yamamoto's bodies with their illusions right before the dynamites that Gokudera was holding explode, destroying his battler watch.

== Reception ==
Due to not having any recurring antagonists or villains in the first seven volumes, the series was initially termed to be an "episodic comedy series," with even the would-be killers turning out to be good guys. The series introduces its first set of recurring villains in volume eight. Still, Leroy Douresseaux of Comic Book Bin points out that despite Tsuna and company facing the "biggest threat" they have ever faced, the series retains its comedic factor; describing the villains as "really strange adversaries – Naruto meets the defunct FOX TV comedy, Arrested Development." In IGN's review of volume nine, A.E. Sparrow describes the new villains as the "super-powered cadre of bad guys," with Manga Life's David Rasmussen commenting that Mukuro is an evil being. Manga News criticized the Simon Family for being shown able to overpower Tsuna and his friends when Tsuna already defeated Byakuran, as well as lacking originality for exception of Shitt.P. The Simon possessing Seven Flames of Earth is also criticized, considering the flames ruining the already established formula of Dying Will Flames. Manga News praised Demon Spade's role as antagonist, likening his transformation to that of Frieza from Dragon Ball. While finding Demon's motivation similarly lacking originality, the flashback in which it was shown gives nobility to the character. The Vindice is criticized because for despite having powerful introduction, the last fight makes them pale in comparison to the previous antagonists, finding them disappointing in the end.
