= Tsuna Sawada =

Fictional human

- Reborn! character
- First appearance: Reborn! Chapter 1 Reborn! Episode 1
- Created by: Akira Amano
- Voiced by: Yukari Kokubun (Japanese)

In-universe information
- Full name: Tsunayoshi Sawada
- Nicknames: Tsuna; No-Good Tsuna; Tsu-kun; Tenth; Vongola
- Gender: Male
- Title(s): Vongola Decimo; Neo Vongola Primo
- Occupation: Student; Mafia boss (in-training; future)
- Affiliation: Vongola Family
- Relatives: Nana Sawada (mother); Iemitsu Sawada (father); Ietsuna Sawada (grandfather); Yoshinobu Sawada (great-grandfather); Yoshimune Sawada (great-great-grandfather); Giotto/"Ieyasu Sawada" (great-great-great-grandfather)
- Nationality: Japanese (Italian ancestry)

Tsunayoshi Sawada (Japanese: 沢田 綱吉, Hepburn: Sawada Tsunayoshi), commonly nicknamed "Tsuna" (ツナ), is a fictional character and the protagonist of the manga and anime series Reborn! created by Akira Amano. Tsuna is one of the descendants of the Vongola family, a mafia in Italy, and is to be the next and tenth leader of the Vongola. To get him to this position, hitman Reborn becomes his tutor to train him to be a suitable boss. With Reborn's help, Tsuna confronts his fears and befriends several people, some of which become his guardians within the Vongola Family. However, due to Tsuna's high position in the mafia, various other families conspire to kill him, forcing him and his friends to confront them. Besides the manga and the anime, Tsuna has also been featured in video games and light novels based on the series, as well as a CD soundtrack.

Tsuna's character has been very popular with readers; he appeared several times in the top 5 of the popularity polls developed for the series and has taken first place a few times. He has also been featured in merchandise from the series, such as figurines and plushes. Publications for manga, anime and other media have commented on Tsuna's character, adding both praise and criticism. Although Tsuna's story was initially considered simple, writers from various websites have liked his traits and growth throughout the manga.

== Character outline ==
=== Personality ===
Tsuna is a junior-high student who becomes the Vongola Family's mafia boss-in-training. He was recruited because the other candidates died and because of his father, Sawada Iemitsu, the external advisor of Vongola, as only those of the Vongola bloodline can become boss. Others call him "No Good Tsuna" (ダメツナ, Dame Tsuna) for his poor grades, bad luck, and lack of athleticism. He is normally insecure, considering himself a loser, and has a crush on Kyoko Sasagawa, seeing her as the only reason to go to school.

When Reborn shoots him with the Vongola Family's Dying Will Bullet, he returns as a powerful berserker who aims to act on his regrets to make it right. However, if he does not regret anything when shot, he will die. Ironically, Tsuna's friends are amazed by his actions in this mode, causing several people to be interested in his skills. He also manages to befriend Kyoko, which makes him happy. Over time, he finds himself thrust into the life of the mafia and meets new friends while facing the challenges his new life holds.

Although Tsuna is to be the tenth generation Vongola boss, he is unwilling to be involved in the mafia and those associated with it, and denies that he is a future mafia boss. In the Vongola Test, he states that he would rather destroy the Vongola family than accept its history of violence and cruelty. Later, even though he still wants nothing to do with the mafia, he is grateful for the friends he has made since meeting Reborn. He cares for his new 'family' and would put himself in danger to protect them, as seen in the Inheritance Arc.

=== Abilities ===
Tsuna in Hyper Dying Will Mode wearing his V.R. X-Gloves in the manga.

Because Tsuna is part of the Vongola bloodline, he has the ability of "Hyper Intuition", granting him greater insight than most. When Tsuna is shot with either the Dying Will Bullet (死ぬ気弾,, shinu ki dan,; "Deathperation Shot" in the Viz Media manga) or the Rebuke Shot (小言弾,, Kogoto Dan,; "Criticism Shot" in the Viz Media manga), or he eats a pill composed with the same material, his body limits are removed. This increases his power and causing dying will flames to emit from his body. The Dying Will Bullet increases his powers to make a task that he regrets to do before he is shot. However, if he does not regret anything when shot, he will die. He can also use variations of the Dying Will Bullet to create any object or to force strength into any part of his body. When shot by the Rebuke Bullet or eating a pill, Tsuna's body limiters are removed, allowing him to take control of his body with the Dying Will Bullet effect. This is known as "Hyper Dying Will Mode".

In Hyper Dying Will Mode, he also uses the X-Gloves (イクスグローブ, Ikusu Gurōbu), which were created by Reborn's pet Leon. It is made out of the same material as the Dying Will Bullets and can ignite Dying Will Flames, allowing Tsuna to use them as thrusters to fly. After passing the Vongola test, the gloves are changed to X-Gloves Version Vongola Ring, which can produce a new type of explosive flame. As Tsuna is unable to control this power, he creates a new attack called "X Burner (イクス バーナー)" to manipulate it, which utilizes the two different flames created by his V.R. X-Gloves. However, he struggles to control it until Spanner gives him special contact lens to calculate the amount of fire.

During the fight between the Vongola and the Varia, Tsuna learns the Zero Point Breakthrough (零地点突破, zero chiten toppa), a technique originally used by the 1st Vongola Boss. With this technique, Tsuna can extinguish and freeze objects and others' flames. Tsuna also creates his own version of the Breakthrough called "Zero Point Breakthrough Custom" (零地点突破改, zero chiten toppa kai), which allows him to capture Dying Will Flame attacks and convert their energy to his own. In his fight against the Millefiore, Tsuna learns a new move called "Burning Axel" and obtains the Vongola Sky Box, which contains the Box Animal, Sky Lion Version Vongola, a miniature lion nicknamed "Natsu" (ナツ). Natsu is able to petrify flames by harmonizing with them and is able to transform into weapons belonging to the first Vongola boss. He can also use the techniques Mantello Di Vongola Primo (Mantle of Vongola Primo), which acts as a barrier, and Mitten Di Vongola Primo (loosely translated as "Primo's Glove"), allowing him to use the technique Big Bang Axle.

Later on, Tsuna receives an upgrade from the metal craftsman Talbot which gives him the Ring of The Vongola Ver. 10. This new form allows him to access a higher level of flame output and increases the power of the original x burner, with the attack having a 'face' which resembles Natsu's. Another technique is the XX Burner, which is a modified X Burner that is twice as powerful since both gloves shoot hard flames while arm thrusters shoot soft flames.

== Appearances ==
=== In Reborn! ===
Following several months of training with Reborn, Tsuna becomes the target of the Kokuyo gang's criminal agenda to destroy the Vongola. The leader Mukuro Rokudo lures Tsuna out into the open by attacking his friends and colleagues until Tsuna, by request of the 9th boss, defeats them. Tsuna succeeds in defeating Mukuro, using his newly acquired X Gloves. Some time later, Tsuna receives the Vongola Ring halves from Dino. and after receiving the "Ring of the Sky", Tsuna undergoes training yet again with Reborn for his oncoming battle against the Varia, who intend on making their boss, Xanxus, the next Vongola boss; Ultimately, Tsuna must battle Xanxus for the right to hold the Ring of the Sky. On the day of the battle, Tsuna's family take a 4–3 lead, but then Xanxus accuses Tsuna for the "assassination" of the 9th boss; all the while, the 9th boss is alive but concealed within an opponent from Tsuna. Eventually Tsuna and Xanxus engage in their Sky Battle. Tsuna eventually overpowers Xanxus, but Xanxus still manages to obtain all seven Vongola rings. However, Xanxus is rejected, not being of Vongola blood; so the victory is awarded to Tsuna.

Days after the battle with the Varia, Tsuna and Reborn are inexplicably transported 10 years into the future, where the Tsuna of that time is in a catatonic state and that the Vongola family is at war with the Millefiore Family. After reuniting the six Vongola guardians, Tsuna attacks the Millefiore base along with Lal Mirch, Ryohei, Yamamoto and Gokudera. When Tsuna's group is discovered, Tsuna covers as a decoy and fights the Milliefiore member Spanner. Tsuna falls unconscious during the fight and is taken captive by Spanner who helps him perfect his X Burner technique. Spanner develops special contacts lenses which assists Tsuna with stabilizing the X Burner and uses it to the defeat the remaining soldiers from the Milliefiore member Irie Shoichi. However, Irie reveals to be a spy allied with Tsuna's future self to help the Vongola defeat the Milliefiore leader Byakuran. Therefore, Tsuna and his friends train to confront Byakuran and his Six Funeral Wreaths guardians. On the day of the battle, Tsuna is chosen to be one of the first combatants in the first game of "Choice", which they lose. Just then, Uni, an acquaintance of Reborn, appears, and Tsuna is tasked with protecting her from Byakuran until he goes to confront him. Once defeating Byakuran, Tsuna and his friends are sent back to their own time by Irie.

In the new "Inheritance Story Arc", Tsuna makes friends with transfer students who turn out to be members of the Shimon Family, a small Mafia clan. Later, they attack him and his guardians as revenge for Vongola Primo apparently betraying their family's founder. The rings are destroyed but repaired. An old man, Talbot, uses the Vongola Primo's blood, Penalty, to give the rings an upgrade with only a 50-50 chance it'll work. Tsuna is able to 'reawaken' his ring, transforming it into a unique form called "The Ring of the Sky, Version X", a finger armor ring with a second smaller ring connected by a chain. Tsuna and co. arrive at the Shimon Family's island, ready to take on the challenge. He witnesses his Guardians take on the other Guardians of the Shimon family. Tsuna is then attacked by an enraged Enma, the boss of Shimon, after the Vongola wins three battles consecutively, and Tsuna is told that his father was in charge of the murder of Enma's family, leaving Tsuna in a brief catatonic state. His confidence and determination revived with Hibari's help and the revelation of the fifth key that showed Giotto never betrayed Cozart Shimon. After defeating and rescuing Enma from Daemon's manipulation, he and Enma confronts Daemon together who had obtained Mukuro's body. Daemon reveals he was the one who killed Enma's family (disguised as Tsuna's father) and while he briefly gains the upper hand, Tsuna's ring combines with Enma's and allows him to defeat Daemon.

After this, Tsuna tries to return to his daily life with his friends at Namimori Middle. However, when Reborn starts having strange dreams of Checkerface, also known more mysteriously as "The Man in the Iron Hat", Tsuna and his fellow student Dino Cavallone are roped into being his representatives in the "Battle of the Rainbow". Joining their team are Yamamoto, Gokudera and Ryohei. Before the battles start, Byakuran flies to Tsuna's house and alights on his roof, offering an alliance with Team Uni. Tsuna accepts the offer reluctantly, still unsure of Byakuran's intentions, but willing to trust him because of his kindness towards Yamamoto.

The Battle of the Rainbow soon begins, throwing all the teams into a frenzy. In the first battle, Tsuna is beaten decisively by his father Iemitsu, who is also capable of using the Dying Will Flame. However, Reborn manages to negotiate an alliance with Iemitsu's team in time to save Tsuna's Boss watch from being destroyed. When the Reborn team meets up at a local diner, Tsuna is seen silently brooding on his overwhelming defeat. That night, he, Reborn and Gokudera sleep over at Yamamoto's house. The next day Tsuna catches up with Enma on the events of the battle and is shocked to learn that the whole Shimon family will be on Skull's team. After school, Team Reborn goes to the hideout of Team Uni, with whom they have previously allied themselves. Uni predicts that two teams will be defeated in the next conflict, which begins soon after her statement. Team Verde launches an attack on Team Uni and Team Reborn, destroying Zakuro's watch. Team Colonello is perched on a nearby cliff, with Colonello in his Non-Cursed form. He uses his fully released Maximum Rifle to successfully injure all enemy combatants, excepting their allies on Team Reborn. Tsuna is shocked by his father's ruthlessness and objects to his methods, saying that Team Uni is his ally. Upon hearing this, Iemitsu terminates his alliance with Team Reborn, but gives Team Reborn a chance to escape. Tsuna rejects this, and continues to fight alongside Team Uni. Colonello fires a second shot from his Maximum Rifle, this time including the members of Team Reborn in the attack. Tsuna warns his comrades to take cover, but the shot is too powerful for Tsuna to block himself, according to Byakuran. Uni asks for Tsuna to be protected, so Gamma attempts to fulfill her wish and Reborn scrambles to protect his team's Boss Watch, but Byakuran jumps over both of them to protect Tsuna from the shot. He is blown apart by the shot, allowing Tsuna to move to attack Team Colonello. Reborn denounce his alliance with Tsuna's father and Tsuna battled him for the boss watch. Reborn used his curse free time to teach Tsuna the real meaning of dying will.

=== In other media ===
Besides his appearance in the original manga series and its anime adaptation, Tsuna has also starred in other Reborn! works. He is featured in all of the Hidden Bullet light novels by Amano and Hideaki Koyasu, but with a minor role, as they are focused in other characters from the series. He additionally participated in all of the series' video games, in which he is playable in his Dying Will Mode and Hyper. He is also a playable character in Jump Super Stars and Jump Ultimate Stars where he is paired with Reborn. On January 8, 2008, Pony Canyon released a Character CD featuring both Tsuna and Reborn. It features various tracks and dialogue composed by both of their voice actors: Yukari Kokubun and Neeko. On November 6, 2013, Tsuna and Reborn were announced as playable characters in J-Stars Victory Vs..

== Reception ==
Tsuna was well received within the Reborn! reader base, having ranked as the most popular hero in the second official Weekly Shonen Jump poll of the series, which was divided into heroes and villains. In other polls of the series, Tsuna ranked as the most popular male character, as well as the latest one in which fans selected the characters they would want to see in their future's self appearance. The Japanese music distributor Recochoku has made two annual survey of which anime characters that people would like to marry. Tsuna ranked sixth in the category "The Character I Want to Be My Groom" from the 2008 survey and seventh in the 2009 poll.

Several websites from manga, anime and other media have commented on Tsuna's character. In Manga Life's review of volume nine, the reviewers expressed gratification to the main character's [Tsuna] reform, with David Rasmussen now seeing Tsuna as a "cooler" character compared to how he was before. Erin Finnegan from Pop Culture Shock noted Tsuna to be a very popular character within female readers of the series due to his appearance and praised how entertaining are his comedy scenes. Carlo Santos from Anime News Network commented that Tsuna needs to do more important things in the first volume from the manga to make the series more interesting, such as relating more with the Mafia. However, he noted the "volatile chemistry" between Tsuna and Reborn to be very likely. Charles Tan from Comics Village noted the story of his character to be "simple" but liked how Tsuna is an "inept, bumbling kid" as well as he agreed with Santos that his relation with Reborn is very good. Jarred Pine from Mania Entertainment found Tsuna's appearances in the start of the manga to be very common due to how he starts meeting new friends, rivals and gains confidence. He noted Tsuna's first skills caused by the Dying Will Bullet to be an attempt from Akira Amano to add new things to the story, but added that "it almost cheapens the experience." However, Ben Leary from the same site also found the Dying Will Bullets to be very repetitive, but added that "watching it happen is such a blast you still look forward to it even when you see it coming."
