= Li-Mei Chiang =

Japanese actress and voice actress

- チャン・リーメイ
- Born: Satomi Toyohara; February 2, 1982 (age 43); Yokohama, Kanagawa Prefecture, Japan
- Occupations: Actress; voice actress
- Years active: 2004–present
- Agent(s): L&L Victor Entertainment, Inc.

Satomi Toyohara (豊原 里美, Toyohara Satomi, born February 2, 1982), better known by her stage name, Li-Mei Chiang (チャン・リーメイ, Chan Rīmei) is a Japanese actress and voice actress from Yokohama, Kanagawa Prefecture.

== Career ==
In 2005, she joined BIGLOBE's Trackback Alley blog and a new style of an event using streaming, along with Samlime's Aya Kanai, who was a member at that time. It was set to receive prize money if all the branch offices in Hokkaido could be visited within the time limit, but the order of visits was determined by roulette, so it could not be visited within the time limit. However, this failure led to a plan called Trackback Allai, which followed the second and third bullets.

The second part developed into a national battle between BIGLOBE employees and travel-loving bloggers. The area of the prefecture was converted into points, and how many points could be earned within the time limit. Each participant reported the situation on her own blog.

In the third installment, Akira Tokugawa newly joined the members to do a charge interview on Intel's digital home. In the project for opening the digital home, Toyohara directed and wrote the screenplay, and Aya Kanai was in charge of the art and produced a short movie called "December 25" in 15 hours.

The fourth bullet teamed with Megumi Sugiyama, and challenged the trip to visit the station including "ten" within the time limit as "Lettering Japan's" ten "" organized as the BIGLOBE 10th-anniversary project.

She likes to watch wrestling games and likes to watch dorditions. As well as her career, her special skills include singing, piano, painting, action, and cooking. She is qualified as a UK-certified Aura-Soma practitioner, and practices healing. As a vocalist of "MATOMANIA" from 2010, she also works on original songwriting and composition.

She was rumored to be part of a cult called the Roma Sophie Association (ロマゾフィー協会) which was under criminal investigation in 2010. Chiang announced that she was willing to refrain from performing arts activities immediately after the arrest of a couple of representatives. In the case, all investigations were terminated under the recognition that the police were aware that all members other than the association's sponsors were victims. Some jobs were lifted in December 2010, and all operations resumed in 2011.

== Filmography ==
=== Anime ===
- Yu-Gi-Oh! 5D's as Carly Nagisa (eps. 1 - 129)
- Katekyo Hitman Reborn! as I-Pin
- Sora no Manimani as Haruko Hatori
