= Reborn! =

Japanese manga series by Akira Amano

- 20th tankōbon volume cover, featuring Tsuna Sawada and Reborn

家庭教師ヒットマンREBORN! (Katekyō Hittoman Ribōn!)
- Genre: Adventure; Comedy; Supernatural
- Manga
- Written by: Akira Amano
- Published by: Shueisha
- English publisher: NA/UK: Viz Media
- Imprint: Jump Comics
- Magazine: Weekly Shōnen Jump
- Original run: May 24, 2004 – November 12, 2012
- Volumes: 42
- Anime television series
- Directed by: Kenichi Imaizumi
- Produced by: Yoshirō Kataoka; Yukio Yoshimura
- Written by: Nobuaki Kishima
- Music by: Toshihiko Sahashi
- Studio: Artland
- Licensed by: Remow (streaming): NA: Viz Media (streaming); Discotek Media (home video); SEA: Muse Communication
- Original network: TXN (TV Tokyo)
- English network: PH: ABS-CBN, Hero TV, Studio 23
- Original run: October 7, 2006 – September 25, 2010
- Episodes: 203 + 2 OVAs
- Light novel

Katekyō Hitman Reborn!: Hidden Bullet
- Written by: Hideaki Koyasu
- Illustrated by: Akira Amano
- Published by: Shueisha
- Imprint: Jump J-Books
- Original run: March 12, 2007 – May 2, 2011
- Volumes: 5
- icon

Reborn!, known in Japan as Katekyō Hitman Reborn! (Japanese: 家庭教師ヒットマンREBORN!, Hepburn: Katekyō Hittoman Ribōn! (Note: Katekyō, a portmanteau of Katei Kyōshi, which means "home tutor")) and also as Hitman Reborn! for disambiguation purposes, is a Japanese manga series written and illustrated by Akira Amano. It was serialized in Shueisha's shōnen manga magazine Weekly Shōnen Jump from May 2004 to November 2012, with its chapters collected into 42 tankōbon volumes. The series follows Tsunayoshi Sawada, a young boy who discovers that he is next in line to become boss of the Vongola family, a powerful Mafia organization. The Vongolas' most powerful hitman, a gun-toting infant named Reborn, is sent to teach Tsuna how to be a boss.

An anime television series adaptation by Artland was broadcast on TV Tokyo from October 2006 to September 2010, and ran for 203 episodes. A number of video games, light novels, and other products were also created based on the series. In North America, Viz Media licensed the manga and the streaming rights for the television series for English release. Viz Media only published the first sixteen volumes, with the last one being released in July 2010. Discotek Media later licensed the home video rights for the television series for subbed-only release.

Reborn! is one of the best-selling manga series of Weekly Shōnen Jump, with over 30 million copies in circulation. Reviewers praised its humor, storylines, fights and character designs, noting that the series grew more violent after volume eight, becoming a more typical shōnen series.

== Plot ==
Tsunayoshi "Tsuna" Sawada, an unskilled and timid boy, is identified as the heir to the Vongola Family due to his direct descent from the organization's founder. The current Vongola boss, Timoteo, dispatches the infant hitman Reborn to Japan to tutor Tsuna and prepare him for leadership. Reborn employs a unique training tool, the "Dying Will Bullet" (死ぬ気弾, Shinukidan), which forces its target to pursue their final regret with a powerful, resurrected determination. Through this method, the reluctant Tsuna gradually develops greater confidence and strength, making him a more suitable candidate. He forms close bonds with several schoolmates, including Kyoko Sasagawa.

His progression is challenged by various threats, beginning with a group of escaped mafia convicts. A more significant conflict arises with the Varia, the family's assassination squad, who support their own leader, Xanxus, for the position of Vongola boss. To confront them, Reborn enlists Tsuna's peers to serve as his guardians: Hayato Gokudera, a dedicated bomber expert; Takeshi Yamamoto, a talented athlete who views their conflicts as a game; Ryohei Sasagawa, the boxing club captain; and the head prefect, Kyoya Hibari. They are later joined by the infant hitman Lambo and a mysterious girl named Chrome Dokuro, who is connected to the criminal Mukuro Rokudo.

Following this victory, Tsuna and his guardians are transported into a future where the Vongola Family is being systematically eradicated by the Millefiore family. They discover this was orchestrated by an ally of Tsuna's future self to enable them to confront Millefiore's leader, Byakuran. Byakuran, who possesses knowledge from parallel worlds, seeks to collect all seven Vongola Rings to achieve omniscience. After defeating him, the group returns to their own time.

Tsuna is then formally recognized as Vongola X, but his inauguration is interrupted by the Simon Family, who seek vengeance for a perceived betrayal by the Vongola's founder. This conflict is revealed to be a manipulation by Demon Spade, the first Vongola Mist Guardian, who sought to control Mukuro Rokudo and reshape the family. Tsuna and the Simon leader, Enma Kozato, unite to defeat him, mending the rift between their families.

Subsequently, Reborn and the other Arcobaleno become involved in a competition to lift the curse that binds them to their infant forms. The Vindice, enforcers of mafia law and former Arcobaleno, reveal the event is a selection process for their replacements. Tsuna and his allies defeat the Vindice's leader, Bermuda. The entity known as Checker Face, who inflicted the curse, is revealed to be Kawahira, the administrator of a great power known as Tri-ni-set. He finds a new method to safeguard it and agrees to release the Arcobaleno from their curse.

In the aftermath, Tsuna declines the formal title of Vongola Decimo, and Reborn departs. However, Tsuna soon realizes that, while he remains unwilling to lead a mafia family, his experiences and the bonds he formed have fundamentally changed him. Reborn returns not to train a mafia boss, but to help Tsuna become a new kind of leader, the Neo Vongola Primo, with his trusted friends and partner at his side.

== Production ==
Reborn! was written and illustrated by Akira Amano. She had previously authored several one-shots and a single, short serialization in Kodansha's seinen manga magazine Weekly Young Magazine before debuting in Shueisha's Weekly Shōnen Jump in 2003. Reborn! was published as a one-shot late that year before starting as a serialization the next year. The editorial staff had approached Amano about doing a series that had both gag and action elements. She enjoyed comedy so she began with a style that leaned heavily into jokes while simultaneously planning how its characters would later connect into a larger, overarching narrative. She attempted to create threads that would eventually tie together, even during the episodic vibe of the beginning of Reborn! Having previously completed several one-shots, this rhythm carried over into the manga's earliest comedy chapters. Amano found the weekly serialization schedule of Shōnen Jump far more intense than she anticipated and had to adjust little by little to meet its demand.

She finally decided to transition it a more dramatic storyline once the characters started forming deeper relationships with one another and when reader feedback from this was positive. This shift in tone was also partially because Amano wanted to explore her own expressive range and because she felt readers were becoming more invested in its characters. She thought that series naturally evolved into a full-fledged battle manga because the cast became stronger and more complex. As Shōnen Jump was famous for this genre of manga, she felt she had to establish it with memorable action panels and leave a strong impression on the reader after each fight. This meant putting a lot of effort into making each finishing blow or climax impactful. As her second serialization she wanted to challenge herself with more complicated page layouts and expressions not attempted before. She considers the battle between the protagonists and Mukuro Rokudo to be among the most memorable as she struggled with depicting its illusions and how to create tension with each page turn.

For the art, Amano tended to draw at a relaxed pace with thicker, rounder, softer lines in the early comedic chapters. She found it more challenging during the battle scenes as these required being conscious of velocity of the action panels, their flow, and how they would connect with one another. She intentionally made alterations to her art style when drawing the battles to make the continuity of the action sharper. She stated she used thinner, sharper lines to add a sense of tension and speed. This change was also reflected in character designs, pointing to the cosmetic differences in central character Tsuna Sawada between comedy and action scenes. When completing fights with lots of energy, she found it challenging to keep light pressure on her tools to maintain the velocity and had to discipline herself not to be too bold with the lines. She found it easier to adjust pressure for different line thicknesses with brush pens rather that use standard G-pens.

== Media ==
=== Manga ===
Written and illustrated by Akira Amano, Reborn! debuted as a one-shot in Shueisha's shōnen manga magazine Weekly Shōnen Jump on November 17, 2003. The manga was serialized in the same magazine from May 24, 2004, to November 12, 2012. Its chapters were collected and published in forty-two tankōbon volumes by Shueisha, released from October 4, 2004, to March 4, 2013.

The series was licensed in North America and the United Kingdom by Viz Media, who published the manga under the Shonen Jump Advanced imprint. The first volume was published October 3, 2006, and Viz' last volume—the sixteenth—was published July 6, 2010.

A spin-off manga, titled Vongola GP Kuru! (ボンゴレGP来る!, Bongore GP Kuru!), created by Toshinori Takayama was serialized in Shueisha's Saikyō Jump from December 2010 to November 2012. Its chapters were collected in three volumes, released from June 4 to December 4, 2012.

=== Anime ===
A 203-episode anime television series adaptation, produced by Artland and directed by Kenichi Imaizumi, aired from October 7, 2006, to September 25, 2010, on TV Tokyo. The episodes were collected on DVD volumes by Marvelous Entertainment and released between January 26, 2007, and April 29, 2011. Five DVD box sets were released between June 17, 2009, and March 21, 2012, by Marvelous Entertainment in Japan.

Because the anime series was not licensed for distribution outside Japan, Funimation exercised power of attorney on behalf of the Japanese production company to remove fansubbed episodes of the anime from the Internet. To prevent copyright infringement, cease and desist notices were sent to fansub groups who were subtitling the series. On March 21, 2009, Crunchyroll began streaming subtitled episodes of the series in North America, with new episodes available within an hour after they were aired in Japan. In 2011, Viz Media started streaming the series in an uncut, subtitled format on Hulu and on its VizAnime.com website. On July 18, 2018, Discotek Media announced a home video release of the series, with two 2-disc SD on Blu-ray Disc sets. The first 101 episodes were released on September 25, 2018, and the other 102 on October 30 of that same year. Remow licensed the series in English and started streaming it on its It's Anime YouTube channel in May 2025. Muse Communication licensed the series in Southeast Asia and streamed it on its Muse Asia YouTube channel.

An original video animation (OVA) was produced under the same staff and cast and was released in October 2009 during the annual Jump Super Anime Tour. It was released by Pony Canyon on DVD on July 21, 2010, under the title Katekyo Hitman Reborn! Jump Super Anime Tour 2009: Vongola Shiki Shūgaku Ryokō, Kuru! The Complete Memory (家庭教師ヒットマンREBORN! ジャンプスーパーアニメツアー2009 ボンゴレ式修学旅行、来る! THE COMPLETE MEMORY). The DVD version included a short version shown on the tour and a complete edition with new scenes. In January 2024, Discotek Media announced that it had licensed the OVA, under the title Reborn!: Here Comes a Vongola Family-Style School Trip!, and would release it on a "special fan" Blu-ray set with an English dub produced by Kocha Sound, which would also include a dub for episodes 1, 20, and 77 of the anime series. It was released on September 24 of the same year.

==== Music ====
Reborn!'s music was composed by Toshihiko Sahashi, with each theme released as a single, album or character song. Four Reborn! soundtracks have been released by Pony Canyon in Japan; the first was released on December 20, 2006, and the second was released on April 18, 2007. The third and the fourth were released on August 20, 2008, and September 15, 2010, respectively. Most of the series' Japanese voice actors have recorded songs for the Katekyo Hitman Reborn! Character Soshutsuen Album Vongola Family Sotojo – Shinukidekatare! Soshiteutae!, and Pony Canyon released a three-volume Opening and Ending Theme Songs.

=== Video games ===
Twenty-one video games are based on the series, and its characters appear in Jump Super Stars, Jump Ultimate Stars, and J-Stars Victory VS. The first game release was Katekyo Hitman Reborn! DS: Shinuki Max! Vongola Carnival!! on March 29, 2007, for the Nintendo DS. On June 28 the Flame Rumble: Mukuro Kyōshū fighting game was released, with four other games in the Flame Rumble series released for the DS from September 20, 2007, to July 22, 2010. Katekyo Hitman Reborn! Dream Hyper Battle! was released for PlayStation 2 (PS2) on August 30, 2007, and for the Wii on January 10, 2008. Unlike the PlayStation 2 version, the Wii game added characters from the fight between the Vongola and the Varia. The adventure game Let's Ansatsu!? Nerawareta Ju-daime! was released for the PS2 on October 25, 2007 and a sugoroku-inspired game, Vongola Shiki Taisen Battle Sugoroku, was released on March 27, 2008, for the DS.

Katekyo Hitman Reborn! DS: Fate of Heat, a role-playing fight game, was released for Nintendo DS on May 1, 2008, followed by two sequels: Fate of Heat II: Unmei no Futari on April 16, 2009 and Fate of Heat III: Yuki no Gādian Raishū! on April 29, 2010. An adventure game, Katekyo Hitman Reborn! Nerae!? Ring x Vongola Trainers, was released for the PS2 on August 28, 2008. Katekyo Hitman Reborn! Battle Arena and Katekyo Hitman Reborn! Battle Arena 2: Spirit Burst were released for the PlayStation Portable (PSP) on September 18, 2008, and September 17, 2009, respectively. Another PSP game, Katekyo Hitman Reborn! Kizuna no Tag Battle, was released on February 25, 2010. Katekyo Hitman Reborn! Kindan no Yami no Delta, an action-adventure game for the Wii and PS2, was released in Japan on November 20, 2008. Three other DS games were released: Katekyo Hitman Reborn! DS: Mafia Daishūgō Vongola Festival!! on December 4, 2008, Katekyo Hitman Reborn! DS: Ore ga Bosu! Saikyō Family Taisen on December 17, 2009 and Nari Chara: Katekyo Hitman Reborn! for DSiWare on January 27, 2010.

=== Radio ===
A radio show, ReboRaji! Bucchake Ring Tournament (リボラジ!〜ぶっちゃけリング争奪戦〜, Riboraji! Bucchake Ringu Sōdatsusen~), began on September 10, 2007, after the following week's episode was recorded. Its hosts were Hidekazu Ichinose (the voice of Hayato Gokudera), Suguru Inoue (the voice of Takeshi Yamamoto) and Rika Ishibashi (the assistant). Guests have appeared since the tenth episode, and it was produced before a live audience during the 2007 Christmas break and (late in the series) in Osaka, Nagoya, and Tokyo. Although the planned final episode of Bucchake Ring Tournament aired on June 30, 2008, it resumed three weeks later. Its later title was ReboRaji! Bucchake Namimori Dong Dong (リボラジ!ぶっちゃけ 並盛Dong☆Dong, Riboraji! Bucchake Namimori Don Don), hosted by Hidekazu Ichinose, Suguru Inoue and Toshinobu Iida (the voice of Mukuro Rokudo).

=== Books ===
A book, Katekyō Hitman Reborn! Official Character Book Vongola 77, was published on October 4, 2007, in Japan. Based on the manga, it covers 77 incidents since Reborn joined the Sawada household. The book profiles major characters, with brief side stories not appearing in the manga and color posters by Akira Amano. Katekyō Hitman Reborn! Sōshūhen: Vongola Family, a book focusing on Tsuna, Reborn and Tsuna's Guardians was released on October 30, 2009. On April 2, 2010, an artbook, Reborn Colore!, was published.

Five Reborn! light novels by Hideaki Koyasu and illustrated by Akira Amano, originally serialized in Jump Square, were published by Shueisha. In the first, Hidden Bullet 1: Mukuro's Illusions (隠し弾1 骸·幻想, Kakushi dan 1 Mukuro·Gensō), published on March 12, 2007, Mukuro Rokudo takes over Kokuyo High. The second, Hidden Bullet 2: X-Fiamma (隠し弾2 X-炎, Kakushi dan 2 X-en), published on February 5, 2008, recaps the mystery of Xanxus. A third, Hidden Bullet 3: Millefiore Panic (隠し弾3 ミルフィオーレ・パニック, Kakushi dan 3 Mirufiōre・panikku), published on July 3, 2009, focuses on the Millefiore and Vongola families. The fourth and fifth novels were published on April 30, 2010, and May 2, 2011, respectively.

== Reception ==
The Reborn! manga has been popular in Japan and, according to Mainichi Shimbun, has one of the greatest number of cosplayers in the country. In 2007 it was the tenth-bestselling series in Weekly Shōnen Jump, with a total of seven million copies sold; in 2008, its sales increased to 15 million copies. Reborn! was among Japan's top-selling series for several years. In 2008 the manga sold 3.3 million copies, the country's fourth-bestselling series. In 2009 it was the sixth-bestselling series in Japan, with sales of 3,694,323 copies. In 2010 Reborn! was the eighth-bestselling series, with sales of 3,479,219 copies. The manga was the 24th-bestselling series in 2012, with sales of 1,844,824 copies. As of 2016, the manga had over 30 million copies in circulation. Reborn!'s second light novel was the third-bestseller in Japan in 2008, with sales of 106,229 copies. The anime's DVDs are also popular, sometimes making the Japanese Animation DVD Rankings.

In November 2014, readers of Media Factory's Da Vinci magazine voted Reborn! 17th on a list of Weekly Shōnen Jump's greatest manga series of all time. On TV Asahi's Manga Sōsenkyo 2021 poll, in which 150.000 people voted for their top 100 manga series, Reborn! ranked 67th. Reborn! ranked 64th on NHK's Best 100 Anime Ranking poll, held to honor the medium's 100th anniversary.

Reborn! has been reviewed a number of times. According to Carlo Santos of Anime News Network, although the manga's first volume had a weak plot and its art was "downright messy and crowded" there was "volatile chemistry" between Tsuna and Reborn. Popcultureshock.com said that the series was aimed at girls because of the number of male characters, and cited its good combination of artwork and humor. A. E. Sparrow of IGN liked its lampooning of the "Mafia concept" and the manga's artwork, saying the "cartoonish characters exist alongside chiseled, well-sculpted figures". The series' change in tone evoked a variety of responses; in a ninth-volume review Sparrow said the series "is quickly becoming a great shōnen read in no small part due to this current storyline", noting its evolution since Tsuna began to grow up and the fights became more violent. According to Comicbookbin.com, although the fights were well-done and the series was still funny, volume eight of the manga was too violent and ordinary readers might find it strange. Ben Leary of Mania Entertainment was lukewarm about the series' darker tone since the eighth volume. Praising the fights and the handling of the tournament between the Vongola and the Varia, he missed the series' comedy and hoped it would return after the tournament. Manga News praised Akira Amano's progressing art and visually stunning fight, but finds the ending too abrupt when there are still some unanswered questions.
