= Akira Amano =

Japanese manga artist

- 天野 明
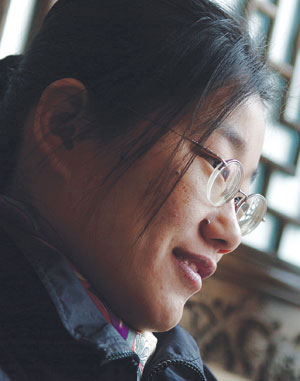
- Born: June 22, 1973 (age 53); Aichi Prefecture, Japan
- Occupation: Manga artist
- Known for: Reborn!

Akira Amano (天野 明, Amano Akira; born 1973) is a Japanese manga artist known for the shōnen series Reborn!.

Early versions of Reborn! were published in seinen manga magazines. In late 2003, the series, a stand-alone short story at the time, was published in the Weekly Shōnen Jump magazine. After the success of the short story, the series began serialization in the magazine in mid-2004. Since then, the manga has been adapted into an anime, as well as five light novels and several video games. She ranked 12th on Nikkei Entertainment's list of most successful manga artists.

== Works ==
- Shōnen Spin
- Neppuu Yakyuu Densetsu Picchan
- Petit Petit Rabbit (ぷちぷちラビィ, Puchi Puchi Rabii) (2000, serialized in Bessatsu Young Magazine and Young Magazine)
- Monkey Business (2002)
- Bakuhatsu HAWK!! (one-shot released in 2003)
- Reborn! (2004–2012, serialized in Weekly Shōnen Jump)
- Psycho-Pass (original character design)
- Warashibe Tantei Numashichirō (one-shot released in 2013)
- ēlDLIVE (2013–2018, serialized in Jump Live, later transferred to Shonen Jump+)
- Sleepy Netarou Appears (one-shot released in 2014)
- Hot (one-shot released in 2018)
- Ron Kamonohashi: Deranged Detective (2020–2025, serialized in Shonen Jump+)
- Suicide Squad Isekai (original character design)
- Holo Beat (original character design)
