= D51 =

D51 or D-51 may refer to:

- D-51, a Japanese popular music group
- JNR Class D51, a Japanese steam locomotive
- HMS Atheling (D51), a 1942 British Royal Navy escort aircraft carrier
- HMS Chevron (R51), a 1945 British Royal Navy destroyer, later re-designated D51
- D51 road (Croatia), a state road
- the ICD-10 code for vitamin B_{12} deficiency anemia
