= World Championship Wrestling (disambiguation) =

World Championship Wrestling was an American professional wrestling promotion that operated from 1988 to 2001.

World Championship Wrestling may also refer to:

- World Championship Wrestling, a television series (later known as WCW Saturday Night) produced by the American promotion, its predecessors and briefly by the WWF
- World Championship Wrestling or "the World Championship area" - common name for Jim Crockett Promotions between 1985 and 1987
- WCW Wrestling, a video game based on the National Wrestling Alliance
- World Championship Wrestling (Australia), an Australian professional wrestling promotion that operated from 1964 to 1978.
- The Alliance (professional wrestling), a professional wrestling stable in the World Wrestling Federation
