= Reborn! season 8 =

Reborn!
- Season 8
- The cover of the first DVD compilation for season eight of Reborn! released by Marvelous Entertainment.
- No. of episodes: 12

Release
- Original network: TV Tokyo
- Original release: April 3 – June 19, 2010

Season chronology
- ← Previous; Season 7 Next → Season 9

The eighth season of the Reborn! anime television series compiles episodes that aired between April 3, 2010, and June 19, 2010, on TV Tokyo. Titled as Katekyō Hitman Reborn! in Japan, the Japanese television series is directed by Kenichi Imaizumi, and produced and animated by Artland. The plot, based on the Reborn! manga by Akira Amano, follows Tsuna Sawada, the future boss of the infamous Vongola Mafia family and the final battle against the Milliefiore family.

Three pieces of theme music are used for the episodes: a single opening theme and two ending themes. The opening theme is "Listen to the Stereo!!" by Going Under Ground. The first ending theme is "Famiglia" (ファミリア, Famiria) by D-51 until 191. The final ending theme is "Canvas" (キャンバス, Kyanbasu) by +Plus. Titled The Original Family De Vongole (I世ファミリー編), its first DVD volume was released on November 26, 2010. The second and third volumes were released on December 15, 2010, and January 28, 2011, respectively.

On March 21, 2009, Japan's d-rights production company collaborated with the anime-streaming website called Crunchyroll in order to begin streaming subbed episodes of the Japanese-dubbed series worldwide. New episodes are available to everyone a week after its airing in Japan.

== Episode list ==
No. overall	No. in season	Title	Original release date
178	1	"The Primo Family Arrives!"; Transliteration: "Purīmo Famirī Kuru!" (Japanese: I世(プリーモ)ファミリー来る！)	April 3, 2010
Realizing that Tsuna and his friends need to become stronger before facing Byakuran, Reborn arranges for Spanner to send them, along with Yuni, back to the past. As they arrive, the day after they completed the Arcobaleno trials, they are met by the other Arcobaleno, who Reborn has called together to train Tsuna and co. Yuni uses her powers to activate Tsuna's Vongola ring, bringing forth the image of the Vongola First. He tells Tsuna and his guardians that the Vongola guardians of the first generation will determine whether Tsuna and his guardians deserve to inherit the real power of the Vongola before leaving. Reborn explains that the First's guardians will appear from the ring to test their respective successors. He then assigns Tsuna and his guardians Arcobalenos respective to their elements train them. That night, the First Generation Guardians appear from the rings of Tsuna's guardians and announce to their respective successors they will be observing their actions henceforth.
179	2	"Inheritance Begins"; Transliteration: "Keishō Kaishi" (Japanese: 継承・開始)	April 10, 2010
While Tsuna and his family are observed by their respective Arcobaleno tutors, Collenello notices that Yamamoto is visibly disturbed by something. The First Generation Rain Guardian, Ugetsu Asari, appears in front of Yamamoto and announces that his trial will take part that night at Namimori Shrine. Yamamoto meets Ugetsu and begins their trial. Yamamoto, blaming himself for their loss in the battle of Choice, fights Ugetsu in an aggressive manner and seemingly defeats him. However, Ugetsu announces that Yamamoto has failed the trial, saying that he is unworthy to inherit his power in his current state.
180	3	"The Duty of the Rain Guardian"; Transliteration: "Ame no Shugosha no Shimei" (Japanese: 雨の守護者の使命)	April 17, 2010
Ugetsu tells Yamamoto he will give him a second chance at the trial the next night and disappears. The next day, Yuni transfers into Tsuna's school, whilst Tsuna and his friends attempt to find out why Yamamoto failed his trial. Meanwhile, Kyoko and Haru visit Chrome only to find out from Ken and Chikusa that she has been missing since the day they returned from the future. That night, after talking with his father, Yamamoto arrives at the shrine where Tsuna tells him to not push himself. Yamamoto and Ugetsu engage in battle and Yamamoto prepares to deliver the finishing blow but suddenly stops as he remembers his father's and Tsuna's words. Ugetsu declares that Yamamoto has passed the trial and explains that Yamamoto failed the trial last time because he attempted to betray his heart and kill a person. Before leaving, he tells Yamamoto the Rain Guardian must not run dry and must keep his friends together.
181	4	"Furious Bolt of Lightning"; Transliteration: "Hageshiki Raigeki" (Japanese: 激しき雷撃)	April 24, 2010
Lampo appears before Tsuna and the sleeping Lambo and announces that Lambo's trial will take place at an amusement park. To pass Lampo's trial, Lambo has to gather three stamps by riding three amusement park rides and enter the castle which Lampo resides. The rides are the teacups, a miniature race track, and a course through a robot museum. While going through the rides, Verde hacks into the amusement park systems in order to perform various tests on Lambo and to deduce why Lambo has such a high resistance to electricity. After Verde captures Lambo with a robot, Lambo's fear causes him to release all the electricity Verde shocked him with and which causes an explosion destroying Verde's robot and sends Tsuna and Lambo into castle. Lampo initially deems Lambo has failed the trial since Tsuna missed stamping the paper but decides to pass Lambo after seeing the electricity Lambo released.
182	5	"Silent Storm"; Transliteration: "Shizuka Naru Arashi" (Japanese: 静かなる嵐)	May 1, 2010
Gokudera, impatient with the trials, begins training at the park early in the morning. While Gokudera is busy looking for Uri who runs away, G disguises himself as Gokudera with Fong buy some times for him. At school, Tsuna and his friends notice that Gokudera has been calmer and more reliable than usual, which arouses Tsuna's suspicion. While walking home, Tsuna and Gokudera run into the real Gokudera who reveals that G has been impersonating him. G reveals himself and asks Tsuna how his performance was at school. Tsuna comments that G has been reliable and helpful, which causes G to denounce Gokudera as being unsuitable to be Tsuna's Right Hand man and deems him unworthy of being the Storm Guardian. When G demands Gokudera to return the Vongola Ring and leave Japan, Tsuna defends Gokudera stating that Gokudera is not supposed to be his Right-Hand man but his friend. G then reveals that his trial was to test Tsuna and Gokudera's bond and deems him worthy of the Guardian of Storm.
183	6	"Aloof Cloud"; Transliteration: "Kokō no Ukigumo" (Japanese: 孤高の浮雲)	May 8, 2010
Hibari's trial does not involve combat which causes Hibari to lose interest. Alaude, the First Cloud Guardian, tells Hibari he must demonstrate his worth as the Cloud Guardian to pass his trial and he has a day to complete it. While Tsuna and his friends try to persuade Hibari to take the trial to no avail, leaving only Ryohei to persuade him. During Ryohei's persistent way of persuading Hibari, Skull appears with a blimp and attempts to force Hibari to take the trial by attacking him. Hibari damages the blimp which causes it to begin its descent on the school.
184	7	"Sunny then Cloudy"; Transliteration: "Hare Nochi Kumo" (Japanese: 晴のち雲)	May 15, 2010
Ryohei manages to destroy the blimp before it crashes into the school. Skull, enraged by the two, continues his attack on the school but is soon defeated by Hibari. Soon after, the First Sun Guardian, Knuckle, allows Ryohei to pass his trial after witnessing his extreme optimism for the day and how he defeated the blimp without fear in order to protect his friends and finally able to convince Hibari to take trial, something that no one able to achieve. Alaude then makes his appearance and announces Hibari has passed his trial as the Cloud Guardian by indirectly protecting the family without fraternizing with them. At Kokuyo Land, Chrome finally returns to her hideout and collapses in tears in front of Ken and Chikusa. While discussing Chrome, Tsuna and co decide to go to Kokuyo Land in case Chrome returns. Outside Tsuna's house, the First Mist Guardian, Daemon Spade, comments that Tsuna is unfit to become Vongola Boss like Vongola Primo once was.
185	8	"The Trap is Set"; Transliteration: "Shikake Rareta Wana" (Japanese: 仕掛けられた罠)	May 22, 2010
Tsuna and his friends are visiting Chrome when they run into Ken and Chikusa who tells them Chrome's strange behavior. They discover that Chrome has completely terrified of something, leading Kyoko, Haru, I-Pin, and Yuni to stay with Chrome until she calms down while Tsuna and the rest go back. Reborn holds a meeting with other Arcobaleno regarding Chrome's sudden change and deduce that it was connected to the First Mist Guardian, Daemon Spade. In the afternoon, Reborn gathers the Arcobalenos and Tsuna's guardians to meet with Chrome once again for the inheritance. However, Daemon Spade appears and traps the Chrome along with the other girls in the building and declares Tsuna is unfit to be the Vongola Tenth.
186	9	"Bewitching Mist"; Transliteration: "Genwaku no Kiri" (Japanese: 幻惑の霧)	May 29, 2010
Daemon Spade reveals that he had been controlling Chrome to draw them out and tells Tsuna and his friends that he will now be testing them all on his own terms in order to turn them into his idea version of the Vongola Family. Tsuna and his friends enter the building and are then separated and confronted by a dark version of themselves created by Daemon. While the dark versions gain the upper hand, Daemon tells Yamamoto that he must kill his double, while simultaneously tells Ryohei to be merciless in battle and abandon Lambo in order to win, and taunts Tsuna and Gokudera that Tsuna is not worth to be protected.
187	10	"Memories of Betrayal"; Transliteration: "Uragiri no Kioku" (Japanese: 裏切りの記憶)	June 5, 2010
Tsuna and his friends continue to battle their respective counterparts. Daemon tries to convince them to become cruel and merciless, but Tsuna and his friends stay true to their convictions and refuses to become the people that Daemon want. During their fight, Daemon reveals to Tsuna that he was the one who caused Primo to flee to Japan in order to have the Vongola be ruled under a more suitable boss since he deemed Primo to be too soft. Fong and Collonelo called Verde and Mammon for their cooperation while Skull bring Hibari to Kokuyo Land by stealing his armband. Once the Arcobaleno has gathered, they able to disperse Daemon's illusionary space with their combined efforts. However, despite the sudden outcome, Daemon refuse to back down and decide to be serious to continue their battle.
188	11	"Primo's Will"; Transliteration: "Purīmo no Ishi" (Japanese: I世の意志)	June 12, 2010
Daemon engages Tsuna alone in battle and traps him in an illusion and tricks Tsuna into firing an X-Burner at where Kyoko, Haru, Yuni, I-Pin, and Chrome are. Mukuro quickly takes over Chrome, averts the attack, and disperses the illusion allowing Tsuna to defeat Daemon. Daemon, convinced he is unable to change the Tsuna and his friends, gives up on changing them. Instead, he begins to questions Mukuro and deems him worthy as the Mist Guardian and allows him to pass the trial as he sees Mukuro much more promising than the other guardians. At that moment, Primo appears and declares Tsuna to be worthy to be the Tenth Vongola Boss after observing his every actions and also passes him. The First Generation of the Vongola Family then return their consciousness to the Vongola Rings and so does the remaining Arcobaleno. The next day, Tsuna and his friends gather at the Namimori Shrine where they are then sent back to the future by Spanner.
189	12	"The Family's Resolve"; Transliteration: "Famirii no Kakugo" (Japanese: ファミリーの覚悟)	June 19, 2010
Reborn recaps the events that took place in the past to Lal Mirch and the inheritance trials Tsuna and his family went through.
