= Fujisankei =

Fujisankei may refer to:

- Fujisankei Communications Group, a Japanese media conglomerate
- Fujisankei Communications International, an affiliate of the Fujisankei Communications Group
