= Reborn! season 9 =

Reborn!
- Season 9
- The cover of the first DVD compilation for season nine of Reborn! released by Marvelous Entertainment.
- No. of episodes: 14

Release
- Original network: TV Tokyo
- Original release: June 26 – September 25, 2010

Season chronology
- ← Previous; Season 8

The ninth and final season of the Reborn! anime television series compiles episodes that aired between June 26, 2010, and September 25, 2010, on TV Tokyo. Titled as Katekyō Hitman Reborn! in Japan, the Japanese television series is directed by Kenichi Imaizumi, and produced and animated by Artland. The plot, based on the Reborn! manga by Akira Amano, follows Tsuna Sawada, the future boss of the infamous Vongola Mafia family and the final battle against the Milliefiore family.

Three pieces of theme music are used for the episodes: a single opening theme and two ending themes. The opening theme is "Listen to the Stereo!!" by Going Under Ground. The first ending theme is "Famiglia" (ファミリア, Famiria) by D-51 until 191. The final ending theme is "Canvas" (キャンバス, Kyanbasu) by +Plus. Titled Future Final Battle Arc (未来決戦編, Mirai Kessen Hen), its first DVD volume was released on February 25, 2011.

On March 21, 2009, Japan's d-rights production company collaborated with the anime-streaming website Crunchyroll in order to begin streaming subbed episodes of the Japanese-dubbed series worldwide. New episodes were available a week after its airing in Japan.

== Episode list ==
No. overall	No. in season	Title	Original release date
190	1	"The Real Six Funeral Wreaths Attack!"; Transliteration: "Riaru Roku Chōka Shurai!" (Japanese: 真6弔花襲来！)	June 26, 2010
The Real 6 Funeral Wreaths arrive in Namimori through the use of the teleportation device. Zakuro invades the Vongola base forcing Tsuna and his friends to flee while Squalo buys them time. Tsuna and co decide to hide at Kawahira's realtor from Haru's advice. The successor of Kawahira realtor, a mysterious man, tells Tsuna and his friends to hide inside while he deals with the Funeral Wreaths.
191	2	"Open Carnage Box"; Transliteration: "Shura Kaikō" (Japanese: 修羅開匣)	July 3, 2010
The man introduces himself as Kawahira, whom Tsuna remembers as the man Future I-Pin always mentioned as her regular customer. He then hides Tsuna and his friends in the building. Using Mist illusions, Kawahira is able to send Zakuro away. Elsewhere at Namimori High, Hibari and Dino confront Daisy in battle. Daisy unleashes his Carnage box and stabs his hand through Dino. Hibari intercepts the killing blow and engages Daisy with his Vongola Box weapon, Alaude's Handcuffs.
192	3	"Alaude's Handcuffs"; Transliteration: "Araudi no Tejō" (Japanese: アラウディの手錠)	July 10, 2010
Hibari defeats Daisy after a short battle and confiscates the Sun Mare Ring. Back at Kawahira's realtor, Yamamoto, Bianchi, Gianni, and Spanner return to the base to search for Squalo. Elsewhere, Byakuran looks at parallel universes and finds where Tsuna and his friends are hiding. Torikabuto manages to enter the realtor and kidnap Yuni by using an illusion and disguising himself as Lambo. Gamma arrives and attacks Torikabuto forcing him to drop Yuni where he then catches her.
193	4	"Daemon Spade's Devil Lens"; Transliteration: "Deimon Supēdo no Ma Renzu" (Japanese: D・スペードの魔レンズ)	July 17, 2010
Torikabuto releases his carnage box putting everyone around him in a powerful illusion. Chrome's Vongola Box, Daemon Spade's Devil Lens allows her to see through the illusion and helps guide Tsuna's attacks. Tsuna eventually defeats Torikabuto with an X-Burner forcing Kikyo and Bluebell to retreat. Byakuran decides to have the Vindice release Ghost, the final Funeral Wreath, from prison in order to utilize him for the upcoming battle. Later, Yuni suggests to Tsuna and co, that they should hide in the forest.
194	5	"The Final Battle Begins"; Transliteration: "Kessen Kaishi" (Japanese: 決戦開始)	July 24, 2010
At the Vindice prison it is revealed that Fran impersonated the Millifiore with illusions and had Mukuro released from prison. Elsewhere, Yuni reveals that her powers of premonition predicted that their final confrontation with Byakuran takes place in the forest and will begin at dawn. While Tsuna and co plan for the upcoming battle, Byakuran reissues the order to have the Vindice prison release Ghost. On the day of the battle, Byakuran and the remaining Funeral Wreaths begin searching for Yuni in the forest. Gokudera, Lal Mirch, and Gamma ambush Zakuro who then releases his Carnage Box.
195	6	"G's Archery"; Transliteration: "G no Acherī" (Japanese: Gの弓矢)	July 31, 2010
Zakuro, in his carnage box released form, incapacitates Gamma and Lal. Gokudera releases his Vongola Box's Cambio form, G's Archery, and is seemingly on par with Zakuro. Zakuro charges towards Gokudera while Gokudera attempts to end the battle with the final shot.
196	7	"Lampo's Shield"; Transliteration: "Ranpō no Shīrudo" (Japanese: ランポウの盾)	August 7, 2010
The explosion resulting from their last attack gives Gokudera the advantage. An attack from Bluebell injures Gokudera and she releases her carnage box intent on killing him. The Varia arrives in time and intercepts the attack. Meanwhile, Ryohei engages Kikyo in battle and is overwhelmed by Kikyo's box weapons, the Cloud Velociraptor. Ryohei asks Lambo if he wants to see Tsuna's mother, reminding Lambo they need to win the battle in order to return home. Lambo releases his Vongola Box in a rage and transforms it into its cambio form, Lampo's Shield. Using the shield, Lambo sends out a surge of electricity defeating the velociraptors.
197	8	"Knuckle's Maximum Break"; Transliteration: "Nakkuru no Makishimamu Bureiku" (Japanese: ナックルの極限ブレイク)	August 14, 2010
Kikyo releases his carnage box which allows him to transform his hair into Spinosauruses and engages Ryohei in battle. Ryohei, uses the Cambio Form of his Vongola Box, Knuckle's Maximum Break, allowing him to gain super-human strength, speed, stamina, and reflexes for three minutes. Kikyo is overwhelmed and uses the spinosaurus to buy time until Ryohei's Cambio Form wears off. Three minutes pass, and Kikyo noticing Hibari on the side, sends his Spinosaurses after Hibari and seemingly kills him.
198	9	"The Last Real Funeral Wreath"; Transliteration: "Saigo no Riaru Roku Chōka" (Japanese: 最後の真6弔花)	August 21, 2010
The Varia are simultaneously defeated by the Real Funeral Wreaths when they reveal their secret abilities. Their deaths, including Hibari's, are revealed to be an illusion cast by Mukuro Rokudo who had replaced them in the midst of battle in order to witness the secret abilities of the Funeral Wreaths. As the battle continues, Byakuran sends Ghost into the battlefield.
199	10	"Ghost Awakens"; Transliteration: "Gōsuto Kakusei" (Japanese: Ghost 覚醒)	August 28, 2010
The Varia and Funeral Wreaths desist from their battles to focus on Ghost. Ghost begins to absorb the Flames from everyone in the battlefield resulting in Bluebell and Zakuro's deaths. Kikyo's reminisces about Byakuran's explanation of Ghost and reveals Ghost was the result of a failed attempt of bringing a Byakuran from a parallel universe into their universe. Tsuna flies towards the battlefield and attempts to use his Zero Point Breakthrough to counter Ghost's absorption of flames.
200	11	"Sky Full of Desire"; Transliteration: "Yokubō ni Michita Ōzora" (Japanese: 欲望に満ちた大空)	September 4, 2010
Tsuna is able to absorb Ghost completely with the Zero Point Breakthrough revealing he was a mass of Deathperation Flames. Byakuran enters the battlefield announcing that all of Ghost's absorbed flames have gone to him. Tsuna, being the only one with sufficient energy left, battles Byakuran alone and is overwhelmed completely. Byakuran creates a translucent hand trapping Tsuna inside whilst crushing his body.
201	12	"Precious Moments in Time"; Transliteration: "Subete ga Daiji na Jikan" (Japanese: 全てが大事な時間)	September 11, 2010
Byakuran coaxes Tsuna into igniting his ring causing a 7^3 reaction which creates an impenetrable barrier whilst drawing Yuni into the same barrier. Byakuran crushes Tsuna into unconsciousness. He then discovers Yuni was attempting to revive the Arcobaleno to restore the balance of the 7^3 and to assist in the defeat of Byakuran. Reborn converses with Tsuna and is able to awaken him by disclosing that Yuni is using her life force to revive the Arcobaleno and will die when the rite is complete. Byakuran mocks Tsuna about his unlucky life and attempts to kill him once more but is saved by Lancia's ring. Tsuna realizes his friends have been with him throughout all the bad times and regains the resolve to fight resulting in Vongola Primo and his guardians to appear from their respective rings.
202	13	"Sea. Clam. Rainbow."; Transliteration: "Umi. Kai. Niji." (Japanese: 「海」「貝」「虹」)	September 18, 2010
Yuni explains that like the Mare ring's ability to allow its user to travel through parallel worlds, the Vongola rings allow the past generation to communicate with their current successors. Vongola Primo converses with Tsuna, revealing the rings had a seal on them, allowing them to be split in half for the Vongola Tournament and their current forms only possess powers equal to the Mare ring. Primo releases the seal causing the Vongola Rings to change forms and disappears. Tsuna continues his battle with Byakuran, overwhelming him completely. As Yuni nearly completes the rite, Gamma manages to infiltrate the barrier and embraces her; exclaiming he will die with her. As the rite completes, their bodies disappear leaving behind the Arcobaleno pacifiers. Tsuna and Byakuran's battle climax with Byakuran perishing from Tsuna's X-Burner.
203	14	"To a New Future"; Transliteration: "Atarashii Mirai e" (Japanese: 新しい未来へ)	September 25, 2010
The Arcobalenos are revived. Collonello reveals that Byakuran's defeat caused all of the crimes he did with the knowledge from parallel world to be annulled and removing Byakuran's reign from all the world. Tsuna and his friends say their goodbyes to their friends before returning the past. During their time travel back, the Arcobalenos do three things: Seal the Mare Rings, gives the people involved with the Vongola the memories from their future selves, and turned the Vongola Box animals into rings. At school, Tsuna and his friends return to their daily life and look towards the sky, thankful for Yuni's sacrifice.
