= Bubble Ghost =

1987 video game

- North American cover art
- Developers: ERE Informatique; Opera House (Game Boy)
- Publishers: EU: Infogrames; NA: Accolade; Game Boy: EU: FCI; NA: FCI; JP: Pony Canyon
- Director: Christophe Andréani
- Composer: Hitoshi Sakimoto
- Platforms: Amiga, Amstrad CPC, Apple IIGS, Atari ST, Commodore 64, MS-DOS, Game Boy, SAM Coupé, Windows
- Release: 1987: Atari ST; EU: 1987; NA: 1988 Amiga, C64; EU: 1988; NA: 1988 MS-DOS, Apple IIGS; NA: 1988 Amstrad CPC; EU: 1988 Game Boy; NA: November 1990; JP: December 21, 1990; EU: 1992 Windows; WW: February 8, 2018
- Genres: Action, Puzzle
- Modes: Single-player, multiplayer

Bubble Ghost is a puzzle video game created by Christophe Andréani for the Atari ST in 1987. The player controls a ghost who, by blowing, guides a floating bubble throughout a number of halls in a haunted house, while avoiding obstacles that can make the bubble pop.

A remake by Nakama Game Studio was released in March 2025 for Windows, PlayStation 5 and Nintendo Switch.

== Gameplay ==

The objective is to guide a bubble throughout a number of halls in a haunted house. If the bubble hits any walls or obstacles, then it will pop and the player loses a life. Obstacles include lit candles, electricity and fans. These can be all controlled by the ghost, who can wander around the level freely and blow at things - such as the bubble to add speed, the candle to put out the flame, or switches to turn them on or off.

The ghost is controlled using the mouse. A press on the left button of the mouse makes the ghost rotate to the left. A press on the right button of the mouse makes the ghost rotate to the right. A press on a keyboard key (Shift) makes the ghost blow.

The game is made of 35 halls (levels). Each time the player makes the bubble exit a hall, he wins 1000 points + left bonus. Action on animation may add 5000 points to the player. The bonus is re-initialized at every new hall. A new bubble is added to the player account each time the bubble exits towards the top of the hall.

== Ports ==
The original Bubble Ghost was created by Christophe Andréani (design, programming) on an Atari ST computer. The game has been adapted for other computers throughout the world.

Some years later, ERE Informatique was bought by Infogrames. Infogrames published a new version of Bubble Ghost with updated graphics, Bubble + (Bubble Plus).

A Game Boy version was published in 1990. It was the first French game adapted for the Game Boy, and one of the earliest games whose music was written by Hitoshi Sakimoto.

== Development ==
The game was programmed in C (editor and compiler: Megamax C) and 68000 assembly language on an Atari 1040 ST computer. The graphics were made with the Degas Elite drawing software. The digital sound of the introductory page of the game ("Welcome to Bubble Ghost") was built using ST Replay. This is the author's voice. The other sound effects use the synthesizer inside the Atari ST.

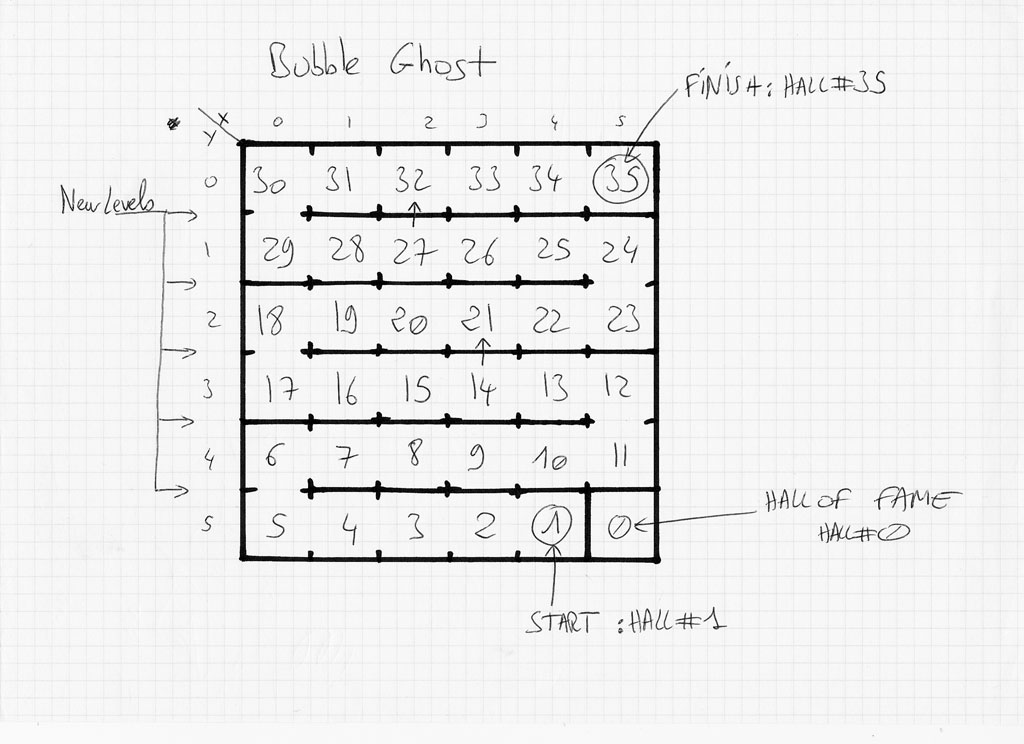
Bubble Ghost, levels order

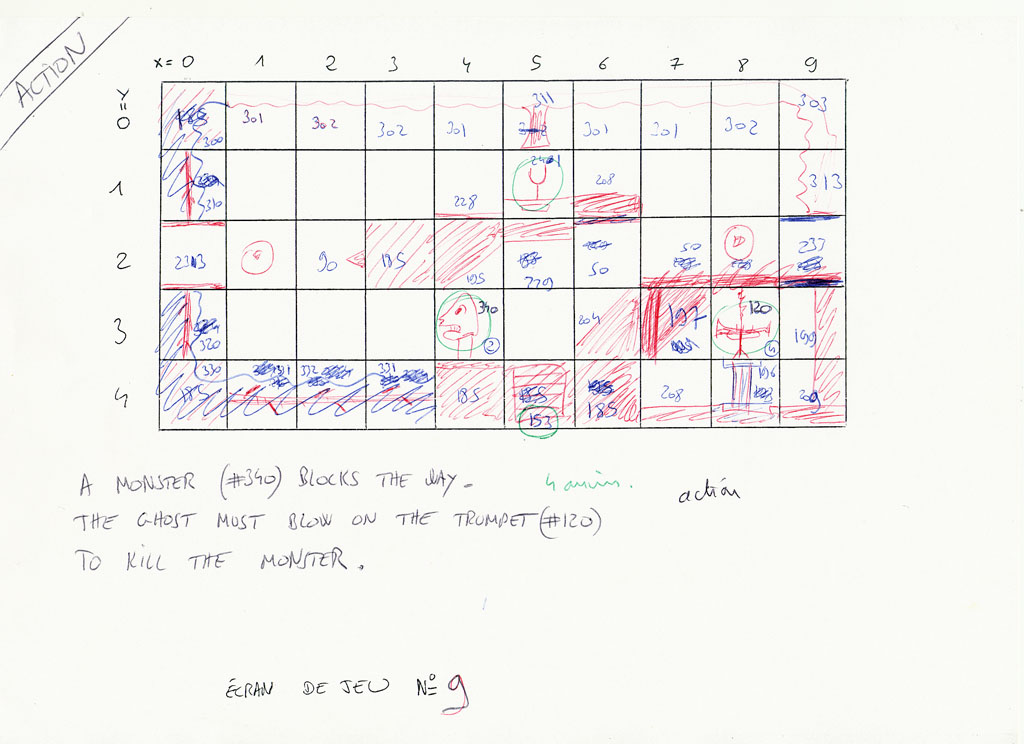
Bubble Ghost, hall#9 design

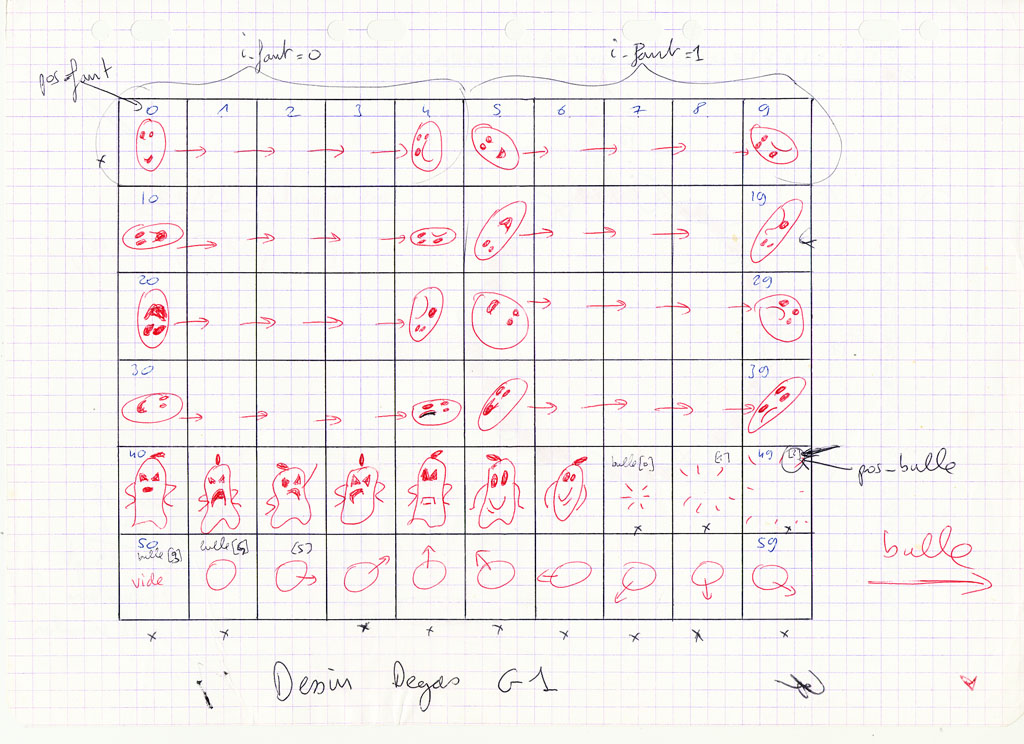
Bubble Ghost, ghost and bubble animation

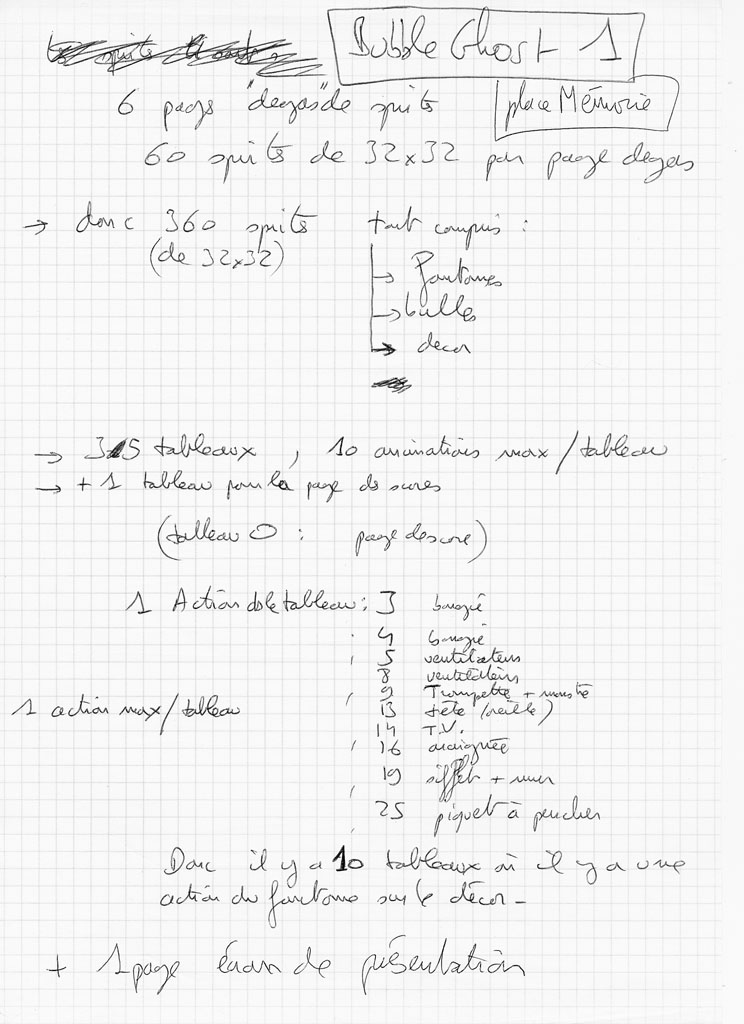
Bubble Ghost, game technical notes

== Reception ==
Reception

Review scores
Publication	Score
GamePro	GB: 15/25
Jeuxvideo.com	14/20

The following French magazines have published Bubble Ghost reviews:

- SVM Science et Vie Micro #45, December 1987 (Atari ST version) Download magazine
- ST Magazine #14, November/December 1987 (Atari ST version) Download magazine
- Micro News #6, November/December 1987 (Atari ST version)
- Le Tatou #10, December 1987 (Atari ST version)
- 1ST (FirST) #4, December 1987 (Atari ST version) Download magazine
- Jeux & Stratégie #48, December 1987 (Atari ST version)
- Génération 4 #2, December 1987 (Atari ST version) Download magazine
- Amstrad Cent Pour Cent #1, February 1988 (Amstrad CPC version) Download magazine
- Génération 4 Hors série #2, oct/nov/dec 1990 (Game Boy version) Download magazine
- Génération 4 #31, March 1991 (Game Boy version) Download magazine
- Player One #18, March 1992 (Game Boy version) Download magazine
- Joypad #7, April 1992 (Game Boy version) Download magazine
- Consoles + #7, March 1992 (Game Boy version) Download magazine

The following US magazines has published Bubble Ghost reviews:

- VideoGames and Computer Entertainment, USA, April 1991 (Game Boy version)
- Antic Vol.7 #7, November 1988 (Atari ST version) See review
- ST-Log Issue 24, October 1988 (Atari ST version) See review
- ST-Log Issue 26, December 1988 (Atari ST version) See review

The following French magazines have published Bubble + (Bubble Plus) reviews:

- Génération 4 #22, May 1990 (Atari ST and Amiga version) Download magazine
- Micro News #35, May 1990 (Atari ST version) Download magazine

== Legacy ==
In 2025, the game Bubble Ghost Remake was presented by Spanish developers in a detailed article, followed by an interview with Christophe Andréani. Bubble Ghost Remake was released on March 27, 2025 on the Nintendo Switch portable game console, PlayStation 5 and Steam platform.
