= Panel Action Bingo =

1993 video game

- Cover art of Panel Action Bingo
- Developer(s): Locus
- Publisher(s): FCI
- Platform(s): Game Boy
- Release: NA: November 1993
- Genre(s): Action/Adventure
- Mode(s): Single-player or Double-player

Panel Action Bingo is a Game Boy action/adventure video game developed by Japanese studio Locus where the player controls a bird. It was released in November 1993 to an exclusively North American market.

== Summary ==
The player's goal is to compete with a cat to navigate and claim squares on a Bingo card, with either numbers or letters pseudorandomly arranged in 1 to 25 or A to Z, respectively. This directly contradicts the number order of real Bingo where the numbers range from 1 to 75 (with each column getting fifteen numbers assigned to it). Also contrary to standard Bingo, the card is shared by both the cat and bird, and the squares are claimed by moving to the next square of numerical/alphabetical order and pressing the A button. Since the cat and bird cannot occupy the same square, the game is more about planning and strategy than flat out luck of ordinary Bingo. Claiming five numbers in a row, column, or main diagonal is a "bingo"; claiming the most numbers without making a bingo is also a win. In a single-player game, earning multiple simultaneous bingos will provide an extra chance for each extra line made.
