= Phantom Fighter =

1988 video game

- North American cover art
- Developer: Marionette/SRS
- Publishers: JP: Pony Canyon; NA: FCI
- Designer: Kunihiko Kagawa
- Programmer: Yoshiaki Sakaguchi
- Artist: Seishi Yokota
- Composer: Hironari Tadokoro
- Platform: Nintendo Entertainment System
- Release: JP: September 16, 1988; NA: April 1990
- Genre: Action
- Mode: Single-player

Phantom Fighter (霊幻道士, Reigen Dōshi) is a beat 'em up video game released for the Family Computer in 1988 in Japan, and for the Nintendo Entertainment System in April 1990 in the United States. The Japanese version is based on the 1985 film, Mr. Vampire (Reigen Dōshi being the Japanese title of the film).

== Gameplay ==
As a kung-fu master, the player must fight through eight towns filled with kyonshi (Chinese vampires), each with a unique town boss, until the final confrontation with an evil witch. An infinite amount of continues are available to complete the game.

A small selection of items, and a large selection of fighting moves, could be used on the enemy. The game also included a hidden character that made the game much more difficult, a baby kyonshi or "conshi." Instead of keeping track of available items, the game's inventory screen tabulates all the possible items in the game.

== Reception ==
Reception

Review scores
Publication	Score
AllGame	3/5
Electronic Gaming Monthly	6/10, 3/10, 6/10, 5/10

AllGame gave the game a score of 3 out of 5 stars.
