= WCW: The Main Event =

1994 video game

- North American cover art featuring Sting
- Developer: Beam Software
- Publisher: FCI, Inc.
- Producer: Sue Anderson
- Designer: Steve French
- Programmer: Cameron Sheppard
- Artists: Alex Efstratiades; Jos Valdman
- Composer: Marshall Parker
- Platform: Game Boy
- Release: NA: February 1994; EU: 1994
- Genre: Fighting
- Modes: Single-player, multiplayer

WCW: The Main Event is a professional wrestling video game released in 1994 by FCI, Inc. for the Nintendo Game Boy portable video game system. It was the second video game based on World Championship Wrestling (WCW), and the first of two released to a handheld console.

== Gameplay ==
There are two types of matches available: a set number of falls (best of one, three, or five) and a set time limit (five, ten, or fifteen minutes). Each wrestler has his unique special move along with punch, clothesline, bodyslam, suplex, dropkick, and cross body block. One can choose between a single match and an elimination match which runs the gauntlet of the remaining wrestlers.

Throwing one's opponent out of the ring is possible, as is fighting outside of the ring. There is no ten-count while both wrestlers are outside of the ring, but one will start after one enters.

== Wrestlers ==
The wrestlers included in the game were considered to be the top-ranked superstars of WCW as of 1993. They were "Ravishing" Rick Rude, Ron Simmons, "Stunning" Steve Austin, Sting, "The Natural" Dustin Rhodes, Johnny B. Badd, Big Van Vader and former tag team duo The Steiner Brothers (who had left for the WWF shortly before the game's release but still appeared in the game as it was too late to remove them).

== Reception ==
GamePro gave the game a negative review. They commented that the options are varied and the controls effective, but that "the fights themselves look weak - the large, cartoony sprites lumber towards each other with bored spectators behind them. The fights sound weak, too, with thin hit effects".

== See also ==
- List of licensed wrestling video games
