= Big Van Vader =

European-American professional wrestler and football player (1955–2018)

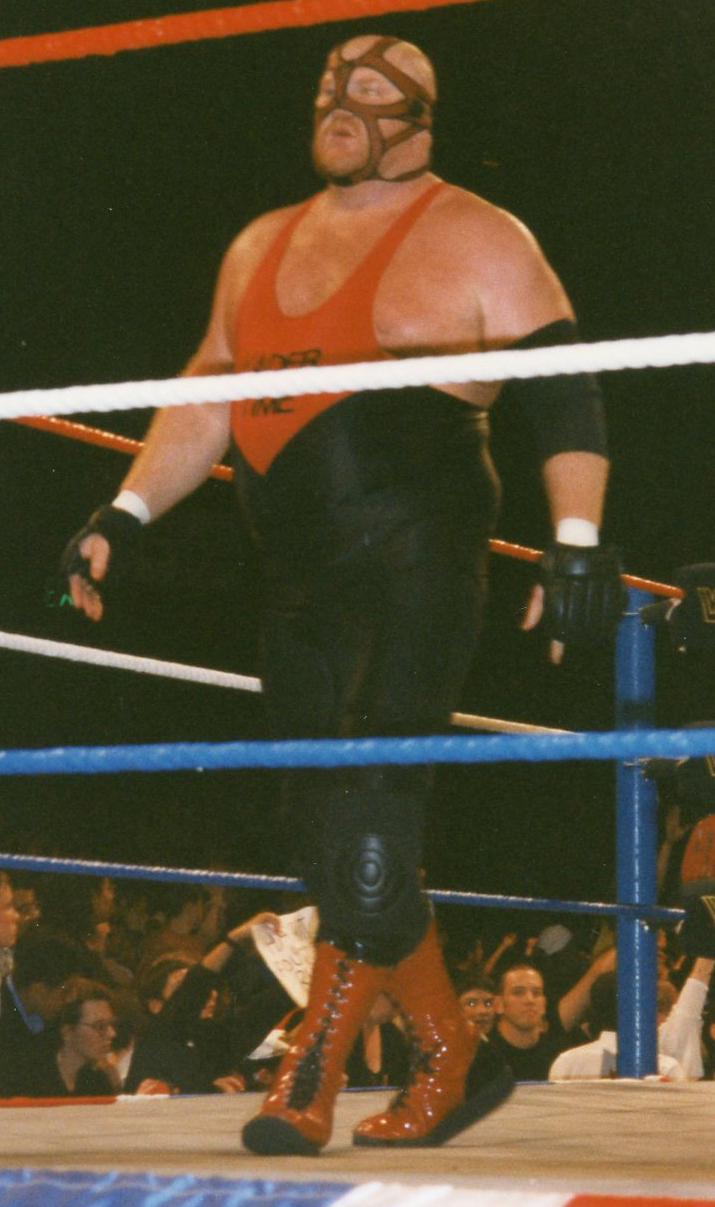
- Vader in 1997
- Born: Leon Allen White; May 14, 1955; Lynwood, California, U.S.
- Died: June 18, 2018 (aged 63); Denver, Colorado, U.S.
- Education: University of Colorado
- Spouse: Grace Connelly (m. 1979; div. 2007)
- Children: Jake Carter
- Professional wrestling career
- Ring name(s): Baby Bull; Bull Power; Big Van Vader; Leon White; Super Vader; Vader
- Billed height: 6 ft 5 in (196 cm)
- Billed weight: 450 lb (204 kg)
- Billed from: Boulder, Colorado; White Castle of Fear ("The Rocky Mountains")
- Trained by: Brad Rheingans
- Debut: 1985
- Retired: May 25, 2017
- Football career

No. 75
- Position: Center

Career information
- High school: Bell (Los Angeles, California)
- College: University of Colorado
- NFL draft: 1978: 3rd round, 80th overall pick

Career history
- Los Angeles Rams (1978–1979)

Awards and highlights
- Second-team All-American (1977)

Leon Allen White (May 14, 1955 – June 18, 2018), better known by his ring names Big Van Vader or simply Vader, was an American professional wrestler and professional football player. During his career, he performed for New Japan Pro-Wrestling (NJPW), Catch Wrestling Association (CWA), World Championship Wrestling (WCW), the World Wrestling Federation (WWF), All Japan Pro Wrestling (AJPW), and Pro Wrestling Noah during the 1990s and 2000s. He is widely regarded as the greatest super-heavyweight professional wrestler of all time.

White performed as a monstrous wrestler, and he was capable of aerial maneuvers: his diving moonsault was voted the "Best Wrestling Maneuver" of 1993 by Wrestling Observer Newsletter (WON) readers. White is a 12-time world champion—he won the IWGP Heavyweight Championship, the CWA World Heavyweight Championship and the WCW World Heavyweight Championship three times each, the UWA World Heavyweight Championship once and the Triple Crown Heavyweight Championship twice. In 1989 he held IWGP title (Japan), CWA title (Austria), and UWA title (Mexico) at the same time. He also won the WCW United States Heavyweight Championship once, and won the battle royal main event of the 1993 Battlebowl pay-per-view (PPV)—among other accolades in WCW, Mexico and Japan. He headlined multiple PPV events for the WWF and WCW. Vader was inducted into the Wrestling Observer Newsletter Hall of Fame in 1996 and the WWE Hall of Fame in 2022. White's life and career has been the subject of the third episode of the sixth season in the Canadian docuseries Dark Side of the Ring.

== Early life ==
He was European-American descent. Leon Allen White was born in Lynwood, California, on May 14, 1955, and grew up in Compton, California. He was raised with his sister in a rough area of Los Angeles known as South Central, where the siblings experienced a home break-in. His father was a US Marine. His father also was an underwater welder for the US Navy and invented an automobile hoist, which made the family wealthier and let them move to a safer neighborhood in Bell, where White attended Bell High School. In high school, he competed in shot put on the track and field team, wrestled, and played football.

== American football career ==
White was a nationally ranked center that was recruited by forty colleges. He played offensive line at the University of Colorado, where he was named a second-team All-American at guard by United Press International for the Buffaloes in 1977. He earned a business administration degree.

In the 1978 NFL draft, White was drafted as a center by the Los Angeles Rams with the 24th pick of the 3rd Round (80th overall). White's second season saw the Rams go to the Super Bowl and earned White an NFC championship ring. White spent the season on the injured reserve list due to knee problems. He did not play a single down and registered no statistics. White was forced into retirement by a ruptured patella.

== Professional wrestling career ==
=== American Wrestling Association (1985–1987) ===
While working out at a gym, White was spotted by a man who remembered him from his college football days who suggested he look into professional wrestling. Trained by Brad Rheingans, White got his first national exposure in the American Wrestling Association (AWA). He went by the moniker Baby Bull, which was later changed to Bull Power. White honed his skills during this time, and his ring work improved significantly to the point that he was booked in a match with Stan Hansen for the AWA World Heavyweight Championship, in which he was defeated.

=== Catch Wrestling Association (1986–1987, 1989–1991) ===
In May 1986, White went to Europe to compete for Otto Wanz and his promotion, Catch Wrestling Association, touring Austria and Germany, using the name Bull Power. That summer, he took part in the three-day tournament for the Vienna Catch Cup, in Austria. He made it to the finals, before losing to Klaus Wallas. On March 22, 1987, he won his first championship, the CWA World Heavyweight Championship, defeating Otto Wanz in Denver, Colorado, ending Wanz's reign of nearly nine years in its only title change in the United States. He held onto the title for nearly four months, before losing it back to Wanz on July 11 in Graz, Austria. In December 1987, he participated in his second tournament, the Bremen Catch Cup, in Germany. He defeated Rambo in the finals, to win his first tournament.

In 1989, Bull Power returned to the CWA, to challenge Otto Wanz for the CWA World Heavyweight Championship. On August 21 in Vienna, Austria, he defeated Wanz to win his second CWA World title. He held onto the title for a little over four months before losing it back to Wanz in Bremen, Germany, on December 22. A year later, Otto Wanz retired and the CWA World title was held up. Bull Power defeated Rambo to win the vacant title for the third and final time. He held to the title for over six months, before losing it to Rambo in Graz, Austria on July 6, 1991. Five months later, he defeated Tatsumi Fujinami to become the inaugural CWA Intercontinental Heavyweight Champion. He vacated the title in 1992 after signing with World Championship Wrestling.

=== New Japan Pro-Wrestling (1987–1992) ===
==== Takeshi Puroresu Gundan (1987–1988) ====
Although originally signed to All Japan Pro Wrestling (AJPW), AJPW owner Giant Baba traded White's contract over to New Japan Pro-Wrestling (NJPW) in 1987 after consideration. Upon joining NJPW, White was given the ring name Big Van Vader and began to wear a black wrestling mask. His new identity was based on a strong warrior of the same name from Japanese folklore. On December 27, Vader was introduced as the crown jewel of the Takeshi Puroresu Gundan stable which was managed by Takeshi Kitano at the Year End in Kokukigan event. Vader challenged Antonio Inoki, who had already defeated Riki Choshu, and defeated the worn-down Inoki. The pro-Inoki audience rioted, resulting in NJPW being banned from Sumo Hall, its home arena. The ban remained in effect until 1989, when NJPW did its first show back in Sumo Hall on February 22.

Vader lost a rematch to Inoki via disqualification on January 4, 1988. He remained unpinned during the first few months of his NJPW career and was presented as a dominant competitor, often winning handicap matches against numerous opponents. On May 8, Vader faced Tatsumi Fujinami for the IWGP Heavyweight Championship after Inoki vacated the title due to an injury. Vader lost the match via disqualification, resulting in Fujinami winning the title. On June 26, Vader challenged Fujinami for the title in a rematch and lost the match. It marked Vader's first pinfall loss in NJPW. Vader entered that year's 1988 IWGP League to become the #1 contender for the IWGP Heavyweight Championship, but failed to win the tournament, lasting it at third place. Vader continued to rise up the ranks in IWGP, becoming a huge main event star by the end of the year.

==== IWGP Heavyweight Champion (1989–1991) ====
After winning the final match of an eight-man tournament against Shinya Hashimoto at Battle Satellite in Tokyo Dome, Vader was declared the new IWGP Heavyweight Champion. He was the first gaijin (non-Japanese) wrestler to hold the title. On May 25, one month after being crowned champion, Vader lost the title to Russian suplex master Salman Hashimikov. Hashimikov dropped the title to Vader's old rival, Riki Choshu, on July 12. On August 10, Vader defeated Choshu to become a two-time IWGP Heavyweight Champion.

On February 10, 1990, Vader faced Stan Hansen at an AJPW versus NJPW supercard show called Super Fight in Tokyo Dome. Before Vader entered the ring, Hansen accidentally broke Vader's nose with the bull rope Hansen carried to the ring for his matches. During an exchange of stiff punches, Hansen unintentionally poked Vader's left eye with his thumb during their brawl, which caused the eye to pop out of its socket. After removing his mask, pushing the eye back into its socket and holding it in place with his eyelid, Vader continued wrestling Hansen until the match was rendered a no contest. As a result of the injury, Vader required a metal plate to be surgically placed under his eye. Vader's success garnered the attention of World Championship Wrestling (WCW), who convinced him to work for them while still the IWGP Heavyweight Champion and an active competitor in NJPW.

In January 1991, Vader defeated Tatsumi Fujinami to earn himself a third IWGP Heavyweight Title reign. During this match, Vader began bleeding from his eye, which required surgery when he returned to the United States. This reign was short-lived, however, as Vader lost the title back to Fujinami on March 4. At this point, WCW and NJPW were reaching a tentative working agreement. This benefited Vader, as he could now have his schedule coordinated far more easily. This helped alleviate his difficulty in gaining notoriety in WCW, as his previously infrequent appearances did not allow the audience to see him very often.

==== Big, Bad, and Dangerous (1992) ====
On March 1, 1992, he and Bam Bam Bigelow began teaming up as "Big, Bad, and Dangerous". The duo went on to win the IWGP Tag Team Championship from Hiroshi Hase and Keiji Mutoh. In May, Vader faced Mutoh, now known as The Great Muta, one on one and suffered a legitimate knee injury. This injury was a factor in him and Bigelow losing the title to the WCW World Tag Team Champions, The Steiner Brothers after a nearly four-month reign. This also marked a decrease in his NJPW appearances, as Vader began to focus almost entirely on WCW and the WCW World Heavyweight Championship.

=== Universal Wrestling Association (1989–1990) ===
In November 1989, White, as Big Van Vader, made his debut in Mexico for the Universal Wrestling Association. On November 12, he defeated El Canek to win the UWA World Heavyweight Championship. Five days later, he made a couple of shows for Empresa Mexicana de Lucha Libre in trios matches, teaming with Fabuloso Blondy. He kept the UWA World title for over a year, before losing it back to Canek on December 9.

=== World Championship Wrestling (1990–1995) ===
==== Early run (1990–1991) ====
Vader was originally signed with World Championship Wrestling (WCW) in 1990 but was only used sparingly until 1991. Vader's first match in WCW took place on July 7, 1990, at The Great American Bash, where he defeated Tom Zenk in a little over two minutes. Seven months later, he returned for WrestleWar, where he battled Stan Hansen to a double disqualification. Eight months later, he returned to Halloween Havoc and took part in the Chamber of Horrors match, in which Vader's team lost due to Abdullah the Butcher being electrocuted by their partner, Cactus Jack. Two months later, he took part in Starrcade's Lethal Lottery, where he teamed with Mr. Hughes and defeated Rick Steiner and The Nightstalker (who was subbing for an injured Diamond Studd) to advance to the Battlebowl battle royal, in which he was eliminated.

==== World Heavyweight Champion (1992–1993) ====
When he began working for WCW full-time, Vader was paired with a manager, Harley Race, and received a shot at Sting's World Heavyweight Championship on April 12, 1992, and was disqualified. Sting suffered a pair of cracked ribs and a ruptured spleen in the match after taking a Vader Bomb from Vader, though he continued to compete infrequently while recuperating. Vader received a rematch with Sting on July 12 at The Great American Bash, which he won to become the new WCW World Heavyweight Champion. His reign was short-lived, as he re-injured his knee, forcing him to lose the title three weeks later to Ron Simmons, who substituted for Sting after he was attacked by Jake Roberts earlier that night. Vader was out of action after Clash of the Champions in September as he underwent knee surgery. Upon his return at Halloween Havoc, Vader sent Nikita Koloff into retirement and legitimately sprained the back of jobber Joe Thurman, sending him to the hospital. At Starrcade, Vader lost to Sting in the finals of the King of Cable tournament. Two days later, Vader defeated Simmons by taking advantage of a shoulder injury of Simmons's to regain the World Heavyweight Championship. On March 11, 1993, Vader lost the WCW World Heavyweight Championship to Sting but regained it six days later.

Upon returning to WCW, Mick Foley, then wrestling as Cactus Jack, defeated Vader via count out on the April 17 episode of Saturday Night. During the match, Jack suffered a broken nose and needed 27 stitches on his face. The match was heavily edited for broadcast, as WCW did not wish to show severe bleeding. In a rematch on April 24, Vader powerbombed Jack onto the concrete floor outside the ring, resulting in Jack suffering a concussion and temporary loss of feeling in his left hand and leg. In the meantime, Vader began to feud with a new arrival to WCW, Davey Boy Smith. They met at Slamboree in May for the World Heavyweight Championship. Vader lost by disqualification when he hit Smith with a chair, though he retained the title. Vader and Sid Vicious then formed a partnership and called themselves The Masters of the Powerbomb. They were defeated by Smith and his new partner, Sting, at Beach Blast in July. Following this, Vader and Cactus Jack's feud was restarted as Jack was cleared to return for Halloween Havoc to face Vader in a Texas Death match. Vader won when Harley Race stunned Jack with a cattle prod that kept him down for a ten count. On March 16, 1994, Foley lost his right ear in a match with Vader in Munich, Germany; Foley's head became trapped in the ropes, which were under excessive tension, causing his ear to be torn off.

Vader was originally scheduled to face Sid Vicious at Starrcade. The real-life dismissal of Vicious after his stabbing incident with Arn Anderson in England, however, forced WCW to find a quick replacement. Executive producer Eric Bischoff placed Ric Flair in the match, which was scheduled in Flair's hometown of Charlotte, North Carolina. In the storyline, Vader did not take Flair seriously until he agreed to put his career on the line against Vader's title. Vader dominated the match, but Flair capitalized on failed interference by Race and Vader's weakened knees to win the match with a rollup and end Vader's third World Heavyweight Championship reign.

==== United States Champion; Dungeon of Doom (1994–1995) ====
Big Van Vader continued to feud with Flair until SuperBrawl IV, when Flair once again defeated him, this time in a "Thundercage" match, with the help of the special guest referee The Boss. As a result, Vader began feuding with The Boss, whom he defeated at Spring Stampede. He also faced Sting at Slamboree for the vacant International World Heavyweight Championship. Sting requested the match rather than be awarded the title after an injury to his original opponent, Rick Rude, and defeated Vader. At Bash at the Beach, he defeated the former Boss, now known as The Guardian Angel by disqualification. Two months later at Fall Brawl, he defeated Angel and Sting in a triangle match to determine the number one contender for the WCW World Heavyweight Championship, now held by Hulk Hogan. A month later at Halloween Havoc, he defeated the Guardian Angel in a rematch. At Clash of the Champions XXIX, Vader defeated Dustin Rhodes and earned the opportunity to face the United States Heavyweight Champion Jim Duggan, whom he defeated for the title at Starrcade.

In January 1995, Vader had to end his alliance with Harley Race, who left WCW after a real-life automobile crash. Vader confronted World Heavyweight Champion Hulk Hogan, and informed him that he could not avoid the monster. The two met at SuperBrawl V, with Vader managing to kick out of Hogan's leg drop after a count of one. The referee was knocked out before Vader hit the Vader Bomb on Hogan. Ric Flair ran to the ring, made the three count, and attacked Hogan, resulting in Vader's disqualification. A rematch was signed, a strap match for the inaugural Uncensored pay-per-view. Flair once again intervened (this time in drag to avoid revealing his presence) and managed to cost Vader the match by getting himself carried by Hogan as he touched all four turnbuckle pads. Vader was stripped of the United States Heavyweight Championship on April 23, 1995, for multiple violent offenses. However, Vader gained another opportunity to win the World Heavyweight Championship from Hogan at Bash at the Beach in a Steel Cage match. He conspired with Kevin Sullivan and the Dungeon of Doom to gain a psychological edge before the encounter, which Vader lost when Hogan escaped the cage. After the match, Ric Flair and Arn Anderson came out and attacked Vader for failing to defeat Hogan in the cage. Vader began a tweener turn and At Clash of the Champions XXXI, Vader defeated Flair and Arn Anderson in a 2-on-1 handicap match. Following the event, Hogan grew interested in Vader and asked for his assistance in his developing feud with the Dungeon of Doom by asking him to join him, Randy Savage, and Sting for WarGames. Vader complied but the storyline never developed as, shortly after, Vader was fired from WCW after a locker room brawl with Paul Orndorff.

The title video for the September 4 debut edition of Monday Nitro featured multiple shots of Vader (along with Hogan, Sting and Savage). Absent from the first episode, he had been scheduled to face Hogan for the WCW World Heavyweight Championship on the September 11 episode but was replaced by Lex Luger, who issued a challenge to Hogan on the debut show.

=== UWF International (1993–1995) ===
In late February 1993, White signed an eight-date agreement with the Union of Wrestling Forces International (UWFi), where he competed as Super Vader due to legal issues concerning the Big Van Vader name. By September 1993, he was simply known as Vader in the United States. He worked with UWFi for over two years, winning the Best of the World Tournament, which started on April 3 and ended on August 18, 1994. Vader first defeated Salman Hashimikov and then Masahito Kakihara in the quarterfinals. In the semifinals, Vader defeated Kiyoshi Tamura, and beat Nobuhiko Takada in the finals to win the tournament and the UWFi Pro-Wrestling World Heavyweight Championship. He would hold onto the title for over eight months, before losing the title to Takada on April 20, 1995. He left shortly thereafter.

=== Return to NJPW (1996) ===
At Wrestling World on January 4, Vader had his first post-WCW match, facing the man whose four-year winning streak Vader had ended over eight years prior, Antonio Inoki. Inoki was over 50 years old at the time, but the match lasted nearly fourteen minutes before Inoki won the match.

=== World Wrestling Federation (1996–1998) ===
==== Camp Cornette (1996–1997) ====
In the weeks leading up to the 1996 Royal Rumble, Vader's debut was heavily hyped on television as he was billed as "The Man They Call Vader" (though Vince McMahon had originally wanted to rename him "The Mastodon"). He made his first World Wrestling Federation (WWF) appearance as a participant in the Royal Rumble match, as he entered at number 13 and eliminated Jake Roberts, Doug Gilbert, one member of the Squat Team, and Savio Vega; he also fought with his ally Yokozuna, but Vader was eliminated by Shawn Michaels before he re-entered the ring and started assaulting everyone, including Michaels. Vader defeated Vega on the following Monday Night Raw, before assaulting WWF officials and eventually, WWF President Gorilla Monsoon demanded that Vader cease his attacks and received a Vader Bomb for his efforts. As a result, Vader was suspended for his actions, though in reality, he needed time off for shoulder surgery.

Jim Cornette campaigned for Vader's reinstatement, and by the time Vader returned, Yokozuna had left Cornette's management. At February's In Your House 6, Vader appeared during Yokozuna's match against The British Bulldog, and as Yokozuna was about to pin The Bulldog, Vader attacked him, handcuffed him, and delivered a severe beating. This led to what was supposed to be a one-on-one encounter between Vader and Yokozuna at WrestleMania XII. However, the match became a six-man tag team match pitting Vader, Owen Hart, and The British Bulldog against Yokozuna, Ahmed Johnson, and Jake Roberts, with the stipulation that if Yokozuna's team won the match, he would have five minutes alone with Cornette in the ring; this never occurred as Vader's team won the match when Vader pinned Roberts.

Vader then attacked the WWF World Heavyweight Champion Shawn Michaels after one of Michaels' matches, which earned him a spot in a six-man tag team match at In Your House 9: International Incident, where Vader, Owen Hart, and The British Bulldog teamed up against Michaels, Ahmed Johnson, and Sycho Sid; Vader pinned Michaels to win the match for his team. Vader faced Michaels again at SummerSlam, where Michaels won by pinfall. Vader and Michaels continued to feud until November 1996.

==== Alliance with Paul Bearer (1997) ====
In January 1997, Vader ended his alliance with Cornette (who in reality was put in a backstage role and was written off television). Vader faced off against The Undertaker in a singles match at the Royal Rumble, and during the match, The Undertaker's former manager, Paul Bearer, attacked him and helped Vader win; Bearer then became Vader's manager. Both Vader and Undertaker went on to compete in the Royal Rumble match, during which Stone Cold Steve Austin was eliminated by Bret Hart; however, the referees did not see this, as they were attending to Terry Funk and Mankind on the floor, allowing Austin to sneak back into the ring and eliminate both Vader and Undertaker, then Bret Hart, who was busy eliminating Fake Diesel, and win the Royal Rumble. As a result of this, Vader and the other men eliminated by Austin, Bret Hart and The Undertaker, were put into the four-way main event of February's In Your House 13: Final Four for the WWF World Heavyweight Championship, in which Vader, after bleeding profusely, was eliminated by The Undertaker. Bearer then persuaded his two proteges, Vader and Mankind, to go after the WWF Tag Team Championship, despite the fact that the two men often brawled between themselves. They failed in their bid to win the tag team gold at WrestleMania 13.

==== Various feuds and departure (1997–1998) ====
Vader again received an opportunity to face The Undertaker, this time for the WWF Championship at In Your House 16: Canadian Stampede, but lost. On the following night's Raw is War, Vader wrestled The Patriot, who won the match and then went after Bret Hart, who came to ringside during the match; Vader attacked The Patriot and then brought him back into the ring, where he went for the Vader Bomb, but Hart came into the ring and laid the Canadian flag over The Patriot, so Vader got down, picked up the Canadian flag, broke it, and started a brawl with Hart. This turned Vader face and served to bring Vader into the USA vs. Canada feud, which culminated at Survivor Series, where Vader was the leader of Team USA, with Goldust, Marc Mero, and Steve Blackman (replacing the injured Patriot) as they faced Team Canada, composed of the British Bulldog, Jim Neidhart, Doug Furnas, and Phil LaFon; during the match, Goldust walked out on his team and Team USA lost the match after The Bulldog pinned Vader after hitting him with the ring bell. Goldust and Vader feuded throughout the fall and finally faced off at the Royal Rumble, in a match that Vader won. Goldust eliminated Vader from the Royal Rumble match later that night (Vader entered at number 30).

Following his feud with Goldust, Vader began feuding with Kane, and both faced off for the first time at No Way Out of Texas, where Vader lost after a chokeslam and a Tombstone Piledriver before Kane subsequently attacked him with a large steel wrench, resulting in Vader being taken away on a stretcher and was kept off of television for a while. Two months later, at Unforgiven: In Your House, Vader returned during Kane's inferno match against The Undertaker; as Kane was attempting to leave the match, Vader appeared and fought him back to the ring to continue the match, which Kane lost. Vader and Kane had a rematch at Over the Edge in a mask vs. mask match, in which Vader attempted to use a wrench on Kane like the one used on him months before, but Kane managed to recover and defeat Vader, costing him his mask in the process. In a post-match interview with Michael Cole, Vader said, "I made the biggest mistake of my life. Maybe Vader time is over. I'm nothing but a big piece of shit. A big fat piece of shit".

Subsequently, Vader had a series of losses and was reduced to the status of a jobber to the stars, having a feud with Mark Henry which Vader lost. After considering retirement, Vader instead negotiated his own release from the WWF so he could once again wrestle in Japan. His final WWF pay-per-view match was a loss to Bradshaw at Breakdown: In Your House in a No Holds Barred match. He lost to Edge on the October 11, 1998, episode of Sunday Night Heat in his final televised WWF match. In a shoot interview, Jim Cornette said part of the reason that Vader's WWF run was not as successful as what was hoped was due to the failure to properly book him.

=== All Japan Pro Wrestling (1998–2000) ===
After leaving the WWF, Vader returned to Japan. He returned to All Japan Pro Wrestling forming a team with his old foe Stan Hansen, with whom he made it to the finals of the 1998 World's Strongest Tag Determination League, where they were defeated by Kenta Kobashi and Jun Akiyama. At the beginning of 1999, he became the number one contender to the Triple Crown by defeating Kobashi. He then won the (vacant) Triple Crown Title on March 6, 1999, by defeating Akira Taue. He then won the 1999 Champion Carnival. Vader lost the Triple Crown to Misawa on May 2, 1999, at the Giant Baba Memorial Show, and he regained it from Misawa on October 30.

While defending the Triple Crown, Vader won the World Tag Team Championship with a recently returned "Dr. Death" Steve Williams on February 20, 2000. However, the week after on February 27, Vader lost the Triple Crown to Kenta Kobashi. Upon losing the title, Vader continued defending his tag team titles with Williams before Vader took some time off, disappearing from TV in April 2000 after a singles loss to Misawa. The Tag Team titles were vacated that month, and Williams went on to feud with Mike Barton to set up their Brawl For All revenge angle.

=== Pro Wrestling Noah (2000–2003) ===
Upon returning from his hiatus, Vader joined Mitsuharu Misawa's newly created Pro Wrestling Noah promotion in October 2000. He had a strong dominance in the tag team division with 2 Cold Scorpio, where they had a great number of victories. Vader earned many singles victories as well against several of the roster's Japanese wrestlers. He often had matches against Jun Akiyama as part of a grudge feud that was carried over from their times facing each other in AJPW. While teaming together, Vader and Scorpio often found themselves fighting against Akiyama and whatever Japanese partner he had at the moment.

Vader and Scorpio won the grudge feud by defeating Jun Akiyama and Akitoshi Saito in the final of the inaugural GHC Tag Team Championship Tournament, on October 19, 2001. They lost the titles to Mitsuharu Misawa and Yoshinari Ogawa on November 30. Having lost the tag team titles, Vader tried to reprioritize himself and pursue Jun Akiyama's GHC Heavyweight Championship (the top title of the company), where it culminated on the final day of the Navigation in Raging Ocean tour, on December 9, 2001. Vader lost the match by submitting to Akiyama, and right after the event he took a break from wrestling for two months.

Vader returned to Noah's television programs in March 2002. He and Scorpio continued teaming, and despite them not winning the titles again, they continued having many victories in the tag team and singles division throughout 2002. Vader's last appearance in Noah was in January 2003.

=== NWA Total Nonstop Action (2003, 2015) ===
On February 19, 2003, Vader appeared in NWA Total Nonstop Action (NWA-TNA) to defend Dusty Rhodes, who was fighting with The Harris Brothers. He and Dusty won a tag team match the next week against the Harris Brothers via disqualification. He then began a feud with Nikita Koloff, whose career Vader ended long ago. However, TNA and Vader soon parted ways.

Vader made a one-off return to TNA on the June 24, 2015, episode of Impact! for a singles match against Bram. Vader won the match via disqualification after Bram used a ring wrench to hit Vader in the head. Matt Morgan then entered the ring to save Vader and take out Bram. This was his final appearance for the company.

=== Sporadic returns to WWE (2005, 2012, 2016) ===
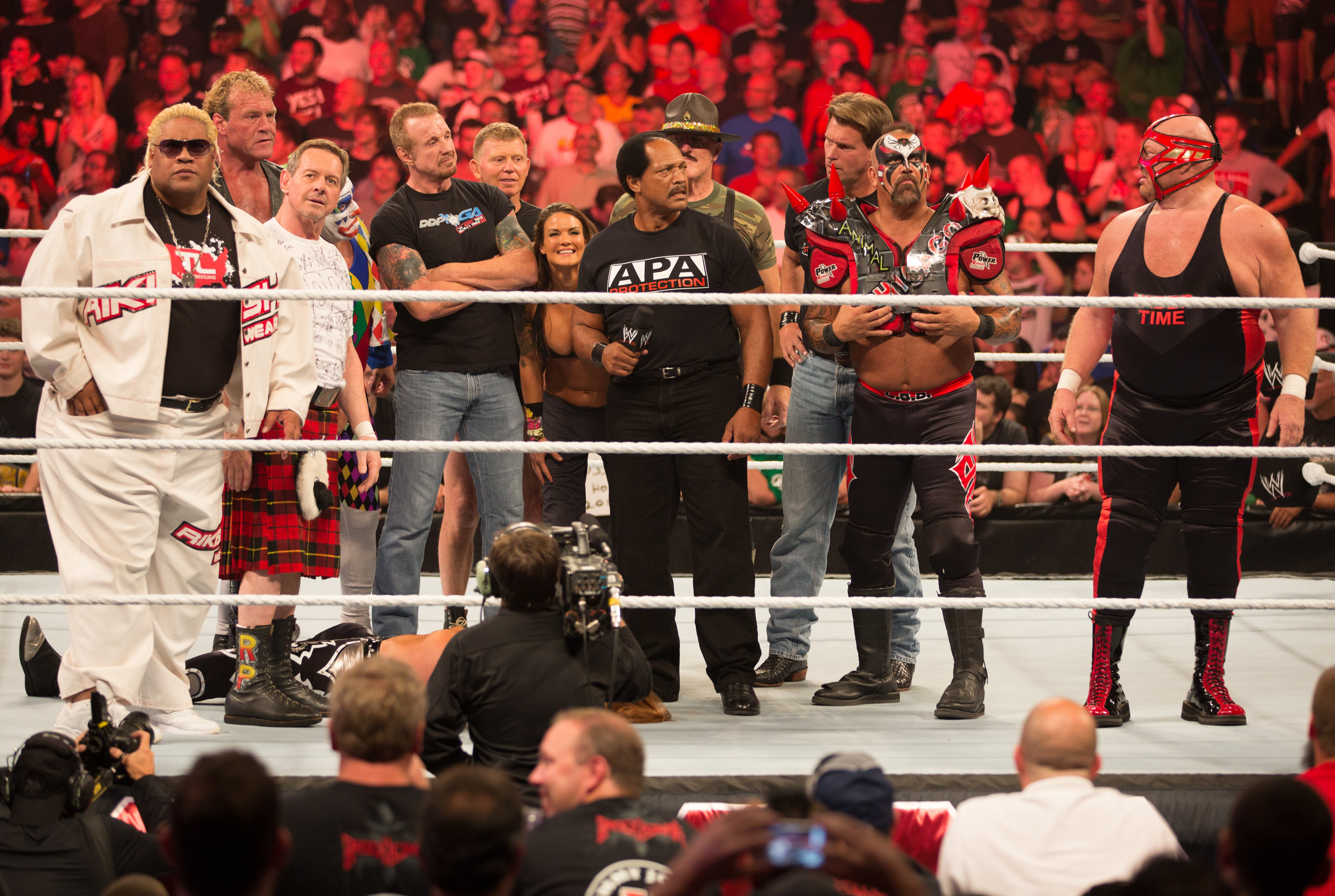
Vader (far right) and other WWE legends after attacking Heath Slater at WWE Raw 1000 in July 2012

Vader returned to the WWF, now World Wrestling Entertainment (WWE), on the October 31, 2005, episode of Raw when Jonathan Coachman announced that Vader and Goldust would be in his corner for his street fight against Stone Cold Steve Austin the next night at Taboo Tuesday. When Austin decided not to participate, he was replaced by Batista. Vader and Goldust interfered in the match on Coachman's behalf and received spinebusters for their efforts.

On the June 11, 2012, episode of Raw, Vader defeated Heath Slater in a singles match. On July 23 on the 1000th episode of Raw, Vader and several other legends prevented Slater from leaving in his match against Lita, which she won.

In April 2016, Vader made a one-night appearance at the 2016 WWE Hall of Fame ceremony to induct Stan Hansen into the WWE Hall of Fame. On March 7, 2022, it was announced that he would be posthumously inducted into the WWE Hall of Fame.

=== Later Career (2004–2007, 2010–2017) ===
Vader returned to Japan, wrestling at a NJPW Wrestle Land show. He also worked in the independent circuit as Big Van Vader, including a tag match with Mike Awesome against Samoa Joe and Dan Maff in Jersey All Pro Wrestling on June 5, 2004. On May 12, 2007, Vader faced Brutus Beefcake at Spartan Slamfest, a World Wrestling Coalition charity show. The match was held at the Kingston Armory in Kingston, Pennsylvania. After wrestling his last match in 2007, White began working as a high school football coach and retired from the sport.

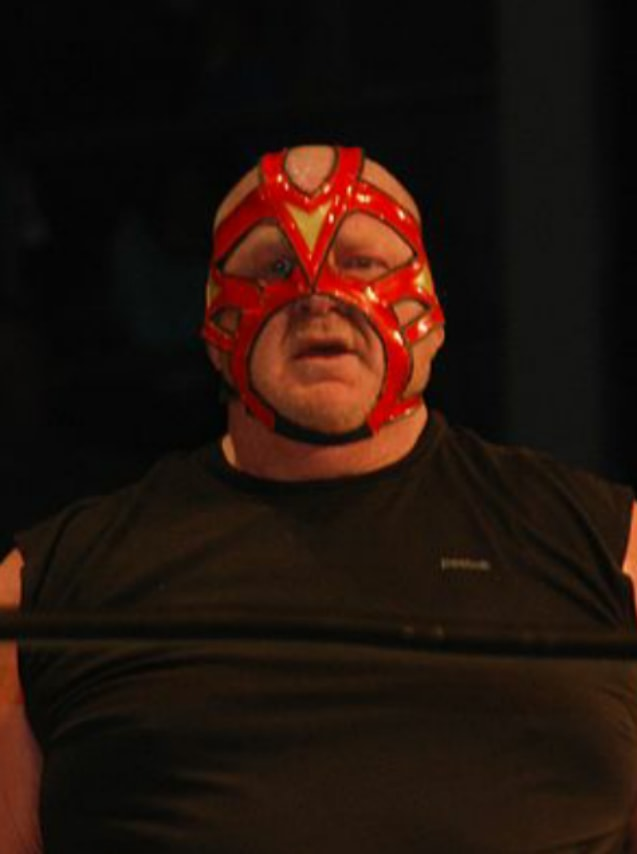
Vader in 2014

On April 29, 2010, White made a return to wrestling under his Vader ring name at the event Vader Time 5 Return of the Emperor. At the event, he teamed with his son Jesse and former tag team partner 2 Cold Scorpio to defeat Makoto Hashi, Tamon Honda and Tatsumi Fujinami in the main event.

Vader made his in-ring return to the United States on January 28, 2012. He defeated Arik Royal and Adam Page in a handicap match at WrestleReunion: Los Angeles. On May 11, 2012, at Resistance Pro's event A Small Deadly Space, Vader defeated Jay Bradley.

In May 2016, Will Ospreay and Ricochet faced each other during the NJPW tournament Best of the Super Juniors. During the match, both wrestlers performed a high flying, fast-paced sequence. When Vader saw the sequence, he complained on social media about the current direction of pro wrestling, specifically about matches being too scripted and overly choreographed. During the following weeks, Vader and Ospreay feuded on Twitter, which led to England-based promotion Revolution Pro Wrestling (RevPro) booking a match between them. The match took place on August 12, 2016, with Vader defeating Ospreay. Two days later, Vader made an appearance in Colchester, England for the XWA Wrestling (XWA) promotion, defeating "Savvy" Sid Scala.

On April 20, 2017, Vader made an appearance in Japan at Korakuen Hall as part of the Dradition show to celebrate the 45th anniversary of the debut of Tatsumi Fujinami. Following a six-man tag team match, Vader collapsed due to being dropped on his head during the match, but he was able to walk backstage under his own power and he remained in Japan as he was scheduled to work two more shows in Fukuoka and Osaka. On April 22, Vader, Takuma Sano, and Yoshiaki Fujiwara lost a six-man tag team match to Koji Kanemoto, Shiro Koshinaka and Tatsumi Fujinami. On April 23, Vader, Riki Choshu, and Tatsumi Fujinami defeated Shiro Koshinaka, Takuma Sano, and Yoshiaki Fujiwara. The final match of his career took place August 26, 2017, for Top Rope Promotions with Vader coming out victorious.

=== Return to AJPW (2011–2012) ===
In the aftermath of the 2011 natural disasters in Japan, Vader and his son Jesse wrestled on special tribute cards for All Japan Pro Wrestling (AJPW) and Pro Wrestling Zero1. On December 7, 2012, Vader returned to AJPW once again, teaming with Keiji Mutoh and Kenso to defeat Bambi Killer, Franz Dynamite and Mazada in a six-man tag team match.

== Professional wrestling style and persona ==
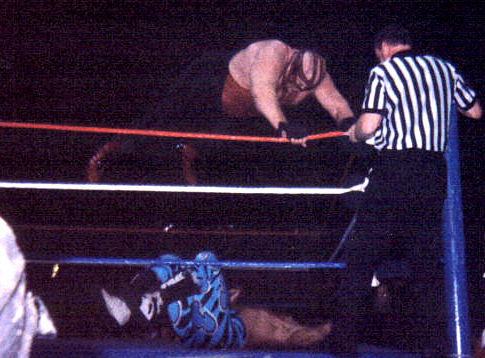
Vader performing a Vader Bomb on Shawn Michaels

White is considered one of the greatest super-heavyweight professional wrestlers of all time. He used his size and weight as part of his moves making them look much more painful than when performed by someone half his size. One example of this was his finishing move, called the Vader Bomb, corner slingshot splash, where he would bounce off the middle rope and land on a supine opponent. He was also noted for his impressive agility, as he can perform a simple dropkick despite his 450 lb (200 kg) frame. One of his signature moves was the Vader Sault, a moonsault or a backward somersault jump off the top rope, a move that requires significant agility and is usually performed by much smaller wrestlers.

== Other media ==
=== Filmography ===
- Fist of the North Star (1995) as 'Goliath'
- Hitman Hart: Wrestling with Shadows (1998) as himself
- The Unreal Story of Professional Wrestling (1999) as himself
- Rimmington Steel (2026) as Witness

=== Television appearances ===
- Boy Meets World (1995, 1996) as Francis Albert Leslie 'Frankie' Stecchino Sr. (3 episodes)
- Baywatch (1996) "Bash at the Beach" as himself (1 episode)

=== Video games ===
The Fatal Fury character Raiden, also known as "Big Bear", is based on Vader's appearance in Japan. The character Alexander the Grater from Saturday Night Slam Masters bears a resemblance to Vader. Alexander also wears a mask very similar to the mastodon mask Vader wore during ring entrances in the 1980s and early 1990s. Vader himself appears as a playable character in the WCW video games WCW Wrestling, WCW: The Main Event, and WCW SuperBrawl Wrestling, the WWE video game WWF In Your House, and as a downloadable or unlockable legend in WWE SmackDown vs. Raw 2009, WWE '12, WWE '13, WWE 2K16, WWE 2K17, WWE 2K18, WWE 2K19 and WWE 2K25. He has also been featured, both officially and unofficially, in numerous Japanese wrestling games, such as the Fire Pro Wrestling series, Virtual Pro Wrestling, King of Colosseum (he is a preset model in King of Colosseum II's EDIT mode), the latter two editions of the All Star Pro-Wrestling series, and Wrestle Kingdom 2, where he is also featured in the cover art.

== Personal life ==
White and his wife Grace Connelly married in 1979. Together they have a son, Jesse White, who was born on April 19, 1986. In July 2009, Jesse began training to become a professional wrestler in Japan. He originally committed to the University of Oklahoma and was touted for the National Football League, but was taken out with a hip injury. In April 2011, he signed a developmental contract with WWE, and used the name Jake Carter, until September 16, 2013, when he was released.

White was a born again Christian.

While in Kuwait during a WWF tour in April 1997, White appeared on the television program Good Morning Kuwait along with The Undertaker, who was WWF World Heavyweight Champion at that time. During the interview, the host asked both of them if wrestling was fake. In response, White flipped over the table they were sitting at and grabbed the host by the tie, asking him if it seemed fake while using foul language. He was then arrested and detained by Kuwaiti authorities for two weeks. In December, White was fined 50 Kuwaiti dinars (about $164) for this incident. In a later interview, it was revealed that this incident was in fact scripted, as it was pitched to both White and Earl Hebner by the producers of the show in an attempt to boost viewership numbers; however, the host was not apprised of the plan, which resulted in him filing for charges against White.

=== Health problems and death ===
Partially due to years of alcohol abuse and travel, White and his wife divorced in 2007, inspiring him to quit drinking and curtail his travel.

White had double knee replacement surgery, resulting in wound infection, and he was bedridden for six months. Soon after recovering, he passed out during a plane trip to Japan for an autograph session. He was in a coma for 33 days, during which he lost 112 pounds.

In November 2016, White was involved in a rollover car accident that left him unconscious for 35 minutes. Being diagnosed with congestive heart failure, he consulted two heart doctors, who told him he had two years to live. He later received another opinion that was more optimistic. In a March 2017 interview on the Two Man Power Trip of Wrestling podcast, White explained that he regretted tweeting about his diagnosis. He said he would continue to wrestle and if the tests were proven to be true, he would like to die in the ring.

In March 2018, White went in for heart surgery followed by another to treat an arrhythmia. White died on June 18, 2018, after a month-long hospitalization for pneumonia. He was 63 years old. In the months before his death, White was frequently visited and supported by fellow wrestler Sting.

== Championships and accomplishments ==
- All Japan Pro Wrestling
  - Triple Crown Heavyweight Championship (2 times)
  - World Tag Team Championship (1 time) – with Steve Williams
  - Champion Carnival (1999)
- Catch Wrestling Association
  - CWA Intercontinental Heavyweight Championship (1 time)
  - CWA World Heavyweight Championship (3 times)
  - CWA Bremen Catch Cup (1987)
- Impact Zone Wrestling
  - IZW Heavyweight Championship (1 time)
- New Japan Pro-Wrestling
  - IWGP Heavyweight Championship (3 times)
  - IWGP Tag Team Championship (1 time) – with Bam Bam Bigelow
  - Super Grade Tag League (1991) – with Tatsumi Fujinami
  - IWGP Title Tournament (1989)
- Pro Wrestling Illustrated
  - Wrestler of the Year (1993)
  - Ranked No. 2 of the top 500 singles wrestlers in the PWI 500 in 1993
  - Ranked No. 27 of the top 500 singles wrestlers of the "PWI Years" in 2003
  - Ranked No. 36 of the top 100 tag teams of the "PWI Years" with Bam Bam Bigelow in 2003
- Pro Wrestling Noah
  - GHC Tag Team Championship (1 time) – with Scorpio
  - GHC Tag Team Title Tournament (2001) - with Scorpio
- Tokyo Sports
  - Best Tag Team Award (1998) with Stan Hansen
- Universal Wrestling Association
  - UWA World Heavyweight Championship (1 time)
- Union of Wrestling Forces International
  - Pro-Wrestling World Heavyweight Championship (1 time)
  - Best of the World Tournament (1994)
- World Championship Wrestling
  - WCW World Heavyweight Championship (3 times)
  - WCW United States Heavyweight Championship (1 time)
  - BattleBowl (1993)
- World Wrestling Federation/WWE
  - WWE Hall of Fame (Class of 2022)
  - Slammy Award (1 time)
    - Crime of the Century (1996) – Assault on WWF President Gorilla Monsoon
- Wrestling Observer Newsletter
  - Best Heel (1993)
  - Best Wrestling Maneuver (1993) Moonsault
  - Most Improved Wrestler (1999)
  - Wrestler of the Year (1993)
  - Wrestling Observer Newsletter Hall of Fame (Class of 1996)

== Luchas de Apuestas record ==
Winner (wager)	Loser (wager)	Location	Event	Date	Notes
Kane (mask)	Vader (mask)	Milwaukee, Wisconsin	Over the Edge	May 31, 1998	

== See also ==
- List of premature professional wrestling deaths
- List of gridiron football players who became professional wrestlers

== Bibliography ==
- Foley, Mick (2000). Have a Nice Day: A Tale of Blood and Sweatsocks. HarperCollins. ISBN 978-0-06-103101-4.
- Race, Harley; Tritz, Gerry (2004). King of the Ring: The Harley Race Story. Sports Publishing. ISBN 1-58261-818-6.
