= Lunar Pool =

1985 video game

- NES box cover
- Developer: Compile
- Publishers: Pony Canyon (Japan); FCI (Worldwide)
- Composer: Masatomo Miyamoto
- Platforms: PC-8800 series, NES, MSX
- Release: PC-88: JP: June 1985; NES: JP: December 5, 1985; NA: October 1987; PAL: 1991; MSX: JP: 1985
- Genre: Sports
- Modes: Single-player, multiplayer

Lunar Pool (known as Lunar Ball (ルナーボール, Runā Bōru) in Japan) is a sports video game. It was developed in 1985 by Compile for the NEC PC-8000 series (in Japan), the Nintendo Entertainment System (NES, in Japan, North America, and Europe), and the MSX (in Japan), and re-released for the Wii on the North American Virtual Console on October 22, 2007. The game combines pool (pocket billiards) with aspects of miniature golf. The object is to use a cue ball to knock each object ball into one of the pockets on pool tables of various shapes. The game offers sixty levels, and the friction of the table is adjustable. Lunar Pool was distributed by Pony Canyon in Japan and Fujisankei Communications International for the rest of the world.

== Gameplay ==
Lunar Pool is played on virtual pool tables of different shapes, some containing obstacles. The player must shoot the cue ball to knock other colored object balls into the pockets. One life is lost whenever the player either fails to pocket an object ball on three consecutive shots or pockets the cue ball. Completing a level awards one extra life, or two if the player has pocketed at least one ball on every shot.

The final stage in Lunar Pool

The value of each ball is determined by its number and the displayed "Rate" value, which starts at 1 and increases after every shot where the player pockets at least one ball. Failing this resets the Rate to 1. Bonus points are awarded for completing a level without a miss.

The game ends after all lives are lost or 60 levels have been completed, whichever occurs first.

== Modes ==
Lunar Pool can either be played alone, against another player, or against the computer. If the game is played against another player or the computer, players take turns shooting the cue ball. If one player fails to knock at least one of the colored balls into a pocket, or pockets the cue ball, then it becomes the opponent's turn.

The game includes an adjustable friction setting, which determines the rate the balls slow down after being hit, as if affected by different amounts of gravity (thus the lunar reference in the title, along with Moon-related background imagery within the game).

== Cultural references ==
In the Mexican soap opera María la del Barrio, José María (Roberto Blandón) plays Lunar Pool on the NES.
