= Shiroi Ringu he =

1995 video game

Shiroi Ringu He: Twinkle Little Star Story
- Cover art
- Developer: Opera House
- Publisher: Pony Canyon
- Composers: Hideyuki Sugai; Kenichi Tomizawa
- Platform: Super Famicom
- Release: JP: October 27, 1995
- Genre: Sports (Professional wrestling)
- Modes: Single-player; Multiplayer

Shiroi Ringu he, full title Joshi Puroresu Story: Shiroi Ringu he: Twinkle Little Star (女子プロレスSTORY 白いリングへ Twinkle Little Star; Women's Pro Wrestling Story: To the White Ring: Twinkle Little Star), is a professional wrestling video game for the Super Famicom that was released on December 27, 1995. Popular female Japanese professional wrestlers like Shinobu Kandori and Noriyo Tateno appear in this game.

== Gameplay ==
In the "story" mode of the game, players control a young woman as she prepares for each match of women's professional wrestling. One of the federations involved in the game is the Ladies Legend Pro-Wrestling circuit. Players essentially improve their skill parameters by training on week at a time. As they progress through their careers, players can either become "babyfaces" (good guys) or "heels" (bad guys). Text boxes allow players to read about the athlete that they are conditioning to fight. There are story elements that allow players to experience a run for the championship.

Using the "play" mode of this game simply allows the wrestlers to face off against each other; with no consequences in the story. Passwords are used to convert the data of a "story" mode character into the "play" mode of the game.

Players can either do a single match (consisting of two opposing wrestlers) or a tag team match (consisting of teams of two wrestlers).

== Release and reception ==
Reception

Review score
Publication	Score
Famitsu	6/10, 5/10, 5/10, 4/10

Shiroi Ringu he was released for the Super Famicom in Japan on October 27, 1995.

== See also ==
- List of licensed wrestling video games
