= Dr. Chaos =

1987 video game

- North American box art
- Developer(s): Marionette/SRS
- Publisher(s): JP: Pony Inc.; NA: FCI, Inc.
- Designer(s): Seishi Yokota
- Composer(s): Hironari Tadokoro
- Platform(s): Famicom Disk System, Nintendo Entertainment System
- Release: Famicom Disk System: JP: 19 June 1987; NES: NA: November 1988
- Genre(s): Action-adventure
- Mode(s): Single-player

Dr. Chaos, officially known as Dr. Chaos: Hell's Gate (ドクター・カオス 地獄の扉, Dokutā Kaosu: Jigoku no Tobira) in Japan, is an action-adventure game originally released in Japan for the Family Computer Disk System in 1987 by Pony Inc. An English localization was produced for the Nintendo Entertainment System that was released in North America by FCI in 1988.

== Plot ==
The story revolves around Dr. Ginn Chaos, a mad scientist who has retreated from society in order to conduct secret experiments in his extensive mansion. His latest invention is an Interdimensional Warpgate, which grants access to another world. When his younger brother, Michael, arrives at the mansion for a visit, he finds Ginn missing. To make matters worse, the mansion's architecture is damaged and overrun with strange, hostile creatures. Michael must now survive their attacks while negotiating the mansion's many corridors in a desperate attempt to find his brother. Dr. Chaos is similar to The Goonies II.

== Gameplay ==
The player of this 2D side-scrolling adventure assumes the role of Michael Chaos, who is armed with only a Knife in the beginning. However, as Michael moves through the house, he can pick up Handgun Bullets, Machine Gun Bullets, Grenades and life-replenishing Yellow Vitamins and Red Vitamins. There is a menu which has four options, open, get, go, and hit. There are 11 Warp Zones in all. At the end of each of the first 10 Warp Zones, Michael must fight a large monster that carries a piece of the Laser and guards a valuable piece of equipment, the latter consisting of the Ultra Space Sensor, four Life Bottles, the Air Helmet, the Jump Boots, two Blue Vitamins and the Shield Suit. Once Michael fully assembles the Laser, he'll be able to challenge the final boss, Canbarian. On top of the normal side-scrolling gameplay, there are also many point and click sections.
