= Tasmania Story =

- Film poster
- Directed by: Yasuo Furuhata
- Screenplay by: Kaneko Shigeto
- Produced by: Hideshi Miyajima; Hisashi Hieda; Shinya Kawai; Satoshi Kiyoshi Ichiko; Charles Hannah
- Starring: Kunie Tanaka; Hiroko Yakushimaru; Motoshii Taga; Jinpachi Nezu
- Cinematography: Junichiro Hayashi
- Edited by: Masaru Iizuka
- Music by: Joe Hisaishi
- Production company: Fuji Television Network
- Distributed by: Toho
- Release date: July 21, 1990 (Japan)
- Running time: 110 minutes
- Country: Japan
- Language: Japanese
- Box office: ¥2.52 billion

Tasmania Story (Japanese: タスマニア物語, Hepburn: Tasumania Monogatari) is a 1990 Japanese film directed by Yasuo Furuhata. The film was produced by Pacific Link Communications Japan, the Fuji Television Network and David Hannay Productions, and was shot in southern Tasmania in the winter of 1989. Tasmania Story stars Kunie Tanaka, Hiroko Yakushimaru and Motoshii Taga in the lead roles, and was released on July 21, 1990 by Toho, in Japan, where it was a financial success.

The soundtrack to the film, composed by Joe Hisaishi, was also released on July 21, 1990. Hisaishi's score was nominated for a Japan Academy Film Prize in 1991.

== Premise ==
Set in Tasmania, Australia, Tasmania Story depicts the tale of a boy who loses his mother and regains contact with his father, who he has been separated from since his parents' divorce. It is a heartfelt family drama, a portrayal of the emotional connection between a child-like father and an adult-esque son that combines the majestic nature of Tasmania with the adorable animals, such as wombats and wallabies.

Shoichi, a sixth-grade boy, lives in Japan. His mother died when he was young, and he is estranged from his father Eiji Kawano, an elite businessman. During his last spring break as a sixth grader, Shoichi decides to visits his father. The last he had heard, Kawano was transferred to Sydney. He travels there looking for him, but instead discovers that his father has moved to the southern island of Tasmania. Shoichi goes to Tasmania with Minoru Tsuzuki, a runaway boy he met in Sydney. He eventually finds Kawano, but he is initially unable to gauge his father's true intentions. Eventually, Shoichi opens up in the wilderness of Tasmania.

Eiji Kawano has recently broken from the leading Japanese trading company he used to work for. As an immigrant to Tasmania, he has been won over by the island's immense natural beauty, and he is conscience-bound to oppose his former employer's ecologically unsound practices, becoming involved in environmental conservation movements. He is also estranged from his son Shoichi, who still resides in Japan. When Shoichi comes to Tasmania for a visit, Kawano must balance the challenge of renewing their relationship, the demands of his conservation work and his obsession with rediscovering the extinct Tasmanian tiger.

== Cast ==
- Kunie Tanaka as Eiji Kawano
- Hiroko Yakushimaru as Naoko Hirashima
- Motoshii Taga as Shoichi Ishizawa
- Jinpachi Nezu as Haruo Tsuzuki
- Yoshiko Miyazaki as Kyoko Tsuzuki
- Kentaro Yokoo as Minoru Tsuzuki
- Kazuko Kato as Saya Thompson
- Sei Kojima as Mariko Thompson
- Naoto Ogata as Hiroshi Nakayama
- Keiju Kobayashi as Yoshishi Ishizawa
- Haruko Kato as Kiku Ishizawa
- Sumiko Fuji as Yasue Ishizawa

== Production ==
Tasmania Story was made and released under unusual circumstances. The Kadokawa film Heaven and Earth was to be distributed by Toho, but due to problems with Toho's distribution rate, Kadokawa switched the distributor to Toei in the winter of 1989. This left a gap in Toho's 1990 summer film lineup. Toho quickly approached Fuji Television Network to plan a new film and fill the gap. Since this problem arose in late 1989, it was decided that the film would be set in the Southern Hemisphere, where sunny skies and a warm climate could be shot for this proposed summer blockbuster. Fuji Television hastily assembled a screenplay and hired noted filmmaker Yasuo Furuhata to produce the film with quick turnaround time.

It was shot in southern Tasmania, near Hobart. The production made use of both Japanese and Australian crewmembers, with bilingual production assistants and impromptu baseball games used to facilitate communication between the two groups. A house was built on private property to serve as one of the film's primary sets. It was left in place when production finished. However, by 2023, the house was slated for demolition after years of disrepair and vandalism.

Upon completion of filming, Fuji Television launched an all-out promotional campaign to ensure the success of the film. A large number of commercials and TV programs were aired, making use of every imaginable creative element, including the beautiful nature of Tasmania, the cuteness of the animals, and puns. They also commissioned the creation of a video game as a tie-in product.

== Release ==
Tasmania Story was released on July 21, 1990 in Japan. The film made ¥2.52 billion at the Japanese box office, drawing an audience of approximately 3.5 million viewers. This made it the second highest-grossing Japanese film of 1990, behind Heaven and Earth. Like Heaven and Earth, Tasmania Story sold a large number of advance tickets (2 million in total). Fuji Television reported that families comprised 80% of the film's audience, while the rest were "office ladies".

After the film's release, plush wombats sold out in Japan, and an estimated doubling of Japanese tourists to Tasmania was expected the following year. In addition, the Tasmanian government said the film brought "unprecedented publicity" to the island state. Prior to its release, it was estimated that 30% of the Japanese population knew of Tasmania; this number rose to 80% afterwards.

Tasmania Story was the recipient of "Silver Excellence" at the eighth Golden Gross Awards, which are given out by the National Federation of Theater and Public Health Trade Associations to highlight notable box office performance.

A DVD of the film was released exclusively in Japan on November 21, 2001.

== Video game ==
Tasmania Story
- North American cover art
- Developer: Pony Canyon
- Publishers: JP: Pony Canyon; NA: FCI
- Platform: Game Boy
- Release: JP: July 27, 1990; NA: April 1991
- Genre: Action
- Mode: Single-player

A screenshot from the game.

In the Game Boy action video game loosely based on the film, the divorced father is looking for a Tasmanian tiger while trying to survive in the harsh wilderness of Tasmania. This game is a port of Pony Canyon's Fruit Panic for the MSX, which plays similar to the classic arcade game Mappy.

Before the gameplay commences, the player is given a choice between the slow mode and the fast mode (using the "Select" button), which modifies the movement speed of the enemies. The player then proceeds to traverse ten levels of varying layouts, having to collect all the plants within each level to proceed to the next level. Four enemies portraying wild animals chase the player character in each level, which the player can knock out for a little while by either planting bombs (one at a time; using the "A" button) for enemies to step on, or by falling onto their heads from above. Being caught by an enemy or falling into a pit left below a jumping platform that has been used too many times in a short period loses the player one life, and losing all lives resets the game. The player starts the game with three lives, which are increased by hitting certain high score milestones, and ten bombs, increased with an additional ten for each lost life. Each level has a theme animal that pops up as an item to be quickly collected before it disappears; both theme animals and additional bomb items pop up by knocking out enemies enough times. The game ends with a congratulations screen after each level's theme animal has been collected, or the game otherwise loops.
