= WCW Wrestling =

1989 video game

- Cover art featuring The Road Warriors
- Developer: Nichibutsu
- Publishers: JP: Pony Canyon; NA: FCI
- Designer: Hiroaki Kawamoto
- Programmer: Hiromu Yamamoto
- Artists: Kyoko Nakagawa; Hisaya Tsutsui; Yoshimasa Furukawa; Aiko Ochi
- Composer: Kenji Yoshida
- Platform: Nintendo Entertainment System
- Release: JP: December 9, 1989; NA: April 1, 1990
- Genre: Fighting
- Modes: Single-player, multiplayer

WCW Wrestling (a.k.a. WCW World Championship Wrestling) is a professional wrestling video game developed by Nichibutsu for the Nintendo Entertainment System. It was originally released in Japan by Pony Canyon in 1989 under the name Super Star Pro Wrestling. It was later released in North America by FCI in 1990 with a World Championship Wrestling license.

It was the first (and, to date, only) video game based on the National Wrestling Alliance (at the time, WCW was a member of NWA). After The Road Warriors joined the World Wrestling Federation, WCW continued to advertise the game in their own catalogs with a mock-up cartridge showing Sting on the label, though no such copies of the game with an alternate label are known to exist or believed to have ever been manufactured. To date, the game has sold over 100,000 copies.

== Gameplay ==
There are two modes for both one and two players, Single and Tag. For One Player Single mode, you choose one wrestler and fight the other 11 opponents, one-on-one, under a five minute time limit. Once you have beaten all 11 of them, you have to face them again before finally getting a shot at WCW Master. The order of opponents is fixed, but it varies, slightly, based on whomever you choose. There is a password system for this mode that allows you to save your progress after every three wins and after you win your first belt. One Player Tag mode allows you to select two wrestlers and face off against random CPU tag teams in a tournament style setting. Each team has to face each other twice, under a 10 minute limit, and the winner of the tournament is decided by the total number of points. The amount of points awarded to each team after a match is dependent on the outcome of the match (Pinfall or Submission, Countout, Time Up/Draw). Two Player Single mode allows you and a friend to choose one wrestler and face each other in a best two out of three setting with a 15 minute time limit. Two Player Tag mode lets you each pick two wrestlers for a best of three match setting under a 30 minute time limit.

=== Default & Selectable Moves ===
WCW Wrestling differs from most wrestling titles in that the players select some of their character's moves prior to the match. By default, each selectable wrestler can punch, kick, headbutt, bodyslam, perform a diving body press pin or diving knee drop off the top turnbuckle, perform two different moves after an Irish whip, and has a unique finishing move. However, each wrestler has a list of eight "charge" moves (from which players can only pick four) that must be chosen before the match begins. Each charge move selected is assigned to a direction on the D-pad and executed by pressing the direction simultaneously with the B button. You can also throw opponents outside the ring. Once outside the ring, you can Irish whip them into the barricade or hit the opponent in the head with a wrench if a member of the crowd tosses one onto the floor.

=== Playable Wrestlers and Final Opponent ===
Playable wrestlers in the game are Ric Flair, Sting, Lex Luger, Mike Rotunda, Road Warrior Hawk, Road Warrior Animal, "Dr. Death" Steve Williams, Kevin Sullivan, Ricky "The Dragon" Steamboat, Rick Steiner, "Hot Stuff" Eddie Gilbert, and Michael P.S. Hayes. The final opponent is "WCW Master" (secretly André The Giant wearing a mask).. WCW Master can be selected, via a password, but it causes the sprites to become glitchy.

=== Irish Whip Moves ===
These moves are performed by first initiating an Irish whip (throwing the opponent into the ropes by pressing left and B or right and B) and then pressing either A or B when the opponent is near. Each wrestler has two different attacks after an Irish whip (though these moves are not selectable in the moveset menu).

=== Finishers ===
Each wrestler has his own finishing move. These must be performed in the middle of the ring and can only be accomplished when the opponent had two squares remaining on his health meter. The move is performed by pressing A and B simultaneously. Finishers deliver significantly more damage than a regular move and are likely to end the match in a pinfall or submission.

== Lineup ==
The Japanese roster is compiled of wrestlers well-known in Japan's All Japan Pro Wrestling and New Japan Pro Wrestling promotions. It features Antonio Inoki, Giant Baba, Jumbo Tsuruta, Gen'ichirō Tenryū, Riki Chōshū, Akira Maéda, Bruiser Brody, Stan Hansen, Big Van Vader, Abdullah the Butcher, Road Warrior Hawk & Animal, and André The Giant.

Below is a list of which WCW Wrestlers that took the place of the original Super Star Pro Wrestling roster:

- Lex Luger replaced Antonio Inoki.
- Ric Flair replaced Giant Baba.
- Mike Rotunda replaced Jumbo Tsuruta.
- Kevin Sullivan replaced Gen'ichirō Tenryū.
- Sting replaced Riki Chōshū.
- Rick Steiner replaced Akira Maéda.
- Ricky Steamboat replaced Bruiser Brody.
- Road Warrior Hawk replaced Stan Hansen (even though he is in both versions, the WCW Wrestling version of Hawk is not based on the Super Star Pro Wrestling version; this is why the US version uses Hansen's trademark Western Lariat as a finisher in the game).
- Michael P.S. Hayes replaced Road Warrior Hawk.
- "Dr. Death" Steve Williams replaced Big Van Vader.
- "Hot Stuff" Eddie Gilbert replaced Abdullah the Butcher.
- Road Warrior Animal is the only one who remains unchanged.
- WCW Master is André The Giant (who is also the final opponent in Super Star Pro Wrestling), but with a mask on and darker blue colored tights. His mask is reminiscent of André's "Giant Machine" gimmick.

There are some inaccuracies in the game, mainly with the birthdates of some wrestlers, and Big Van Vader's hometown and date of birth are not listed in order to protect his gimmick.

== Other games ==
WCW Wrestling was the working title for at least two other WCW games. One was a canceled game for the game.com handheld system. The other was a sequel to Electronic Arts' WCW Mayhem, intended for release on the PlayStation 2 platform (the game was later renamed WCW Mayhem 2, and eventually canceled when WCW was sold to the WWF).

== Reception ==
Reception

Review score
Publication	Score
Electronic Gaming Monthly	7/10, 6/10, 6/10, 6/10

== See also ==
- List of licensed wrestling video games
