= Metal Morph =

1994 video game

- Cover art
- Developer: Origin Systems
- Publisher: FCI, Inc.
- Designers: Axel Brown; Billy Joe Cain; Chuck Zoch; Eric Brown; Julian Alden‑Salter
- Composers: Alistair Hirst; Martin Galway; Jeff van Dyck
- Platform: Super NES
- Release: NA: December 1994
- Genres: Scrolling shooter Run and gun
- Mode: Single-player

Metal Morph is a video game developed by Origin Systems and published by FCI, Inc. for the Super Nintendo Entertainment System.

== Gameplay ==
The gameplay alternates between run and gun and scrolling shooter (playing as a space ship). Both the player character and his space ship are able to use MetalMorphosis (a transformation ability) to navigate certain areas. The player must retrieve missing pieces of the ship, while simultaneously fending off aliens who desire the secret of MetalMorphosis.

== Reception ==
GamePro gave the game a positive review, commenting that the game's two play styles complement each other, the controls are responsive and accurate, the graphics are attractive, and the music and sound effects suit the game's tone. However, they concluded that buying the game is pointless, since the game's level select and non-randomized levels allow the player to see everything the game has to offer on a single rental.
