= Seicross =

1984 video game

- North American arcade flyer
- Developer: Alice
- Publisher: Nichibutsu: NA: FCI (NES)
- Platforms: Arcade, Nintendo Entertainment System, PlayStation 4, PlayStation 5, Nintendo Switch
- Release: JP: April 1984; NA: June 1984
- Genre: Isometric shooter
- Modes: Single-player, multiplayer

Seicross, released as Sector Zone (Note: Japanese: セクターゾーン, Hepburn: Sekutā Zōn) in Japan, is a 1984 isometric shooter video game developed by Alice and published by Nichibutsu for arcades. It was released in Japan in April 1984 and North America in June 1984. A port to the Nintendo Entertainment System was released by Nichibutsu in Japan and FCI in North America in 1986. Hamster Corporation released the game as part of their Arcade Archives series for the Nintendo Switch and PlayStation 4 in 2021, as well as their Console Archives series for the Nintendo Switch 2 and PlayStation 5 in April 2026 and their Arcade Archives 2 series in November 2026.

== Gameplay ==
The player rides a gliding motorcycle-like vehicle, bumping other riders, collecting power modules and collecting blue people who are stranded. A second area removes the riders and adds rough terrain, while the final leg features a battle with one or more Dinosaur Tanks, which launch their heads when destroyed. The sequence repeats infinitely, getting progressively difficult and changing backgrounds.

== Reception ==
Gene Lewin of Play Meter rated the arcade game 8 out of 10, stating it "is challenging as well as fun to play."
