= Bubble Ghost Remake =

Video game remake

- Developer(s): Nakama Game Studio
- Publisher(s): Selecta Play
- Artist(s): Ken Niimura
- Engine: Unity
- Platform(s): Windows; Nintendo Switch; PlayStation 5
- Release: WW: March 27, 2025
- Genre(s): Puzzle-platform
- Mode(s): Single-player

Bubble Ghost Remake is a puzzle-platform video game developed by Nakama Game Studio and published by Selecta Play. A remake of the 1987 game Bubble Ghost, it was released on March 27, 2025 for Windows, Nintendo Switch, and PlayStation 5.

== Gameplay ==
Players control the ghost of deceased inventor Heinrich Von Schinker where, like the 1987 original, he must guide a mystifying bubble through a series of levels while avoiding obstacles along the way.

The remake offers 40 new levels on top of the 35 from the base game, alongside two new modes being Challenge and Speedrun.

== Development ==
The game was announced in September 2023 with illustrator Ken Niimura as lead artist, and initially slated for a 2024 release. In November 2024, Nakama Game Studio unveiled an early 2025 release window for the remake. A playable demo went live the same month.

In February 2025, Nakama and Selecta Play revealed a March 27 launch for the game.
