= WCW SuperBrawl Wrestling =

1994 video game

- Cover art featuring Ric Flair, Sting and Vader
- Developer: Beam Software
- Publisher: FCI, Inc.
- Producer: Steve French
- Designer: Steve French
- Programmers: Jason Bell; Andrew Davie; David Pentecost; Graeme Scott
- Artists: Steve French; Peter Commins; Justin Muir
- Composer: Marshall Parker
- Platform: Super Nintendo Entertainment System
- Release: NA: November 1994
- Genre: Fighting
- Modes: Single-player, multiplayer

WCW SuperBrawl Wrestling is a professional wrestling video game published by FCI, Inc. for the Super Nintendo Entertainment System in 1994. The third World Championship Wrestling (WCW) video game, it is named after the pay-per-view SuperBrawl. It was the only WCW game to be released on the Super NES, and the last to be produced by FCI, Inc. A Sega Genesis version was planned but never released.

== Roster ==
The roster consists of the top WCW superstars of that time each with their own signature move. The lineup includes:

- Barry Windham
- "Flyin" Brian Pillman
- "The Natural" Dustin Rhodes
- Johnny B. Badd
- "Nature Boy" Ric Flair
- Rick Rude
- Rick Steiner
- Ricky "The Dragon" Steamboat
- "All American" Ron Simmons
- Scott Steiner
- Sting
- Vader

== Gameplay ==
Rick Rude wrestles Vader. Tony Schiavone appears in the bottom right corner to provide commentary.

The gameplay takes place from a 3/4 overhead perspective. Each wrestler shares a moveset in the game, with the exception of their signature moves. Every character performs a variety of suplexes, a backbreaker, a tombstone piledriver, an atomic drop, various diving attacks, and a variety of kicks, punches, elbow, and forearm shots. Several finishing moves have a similar appearance to "weak" moves that are done in the beginning of a wrestling match; like Dustin Rhodes' Bulldog and Johnny B. Badd's basic left hook.

Modes of play include singles, tag team, an eight-man singles tournament, a tag team tournament between four teams, and the "Ultimate Challenge", where a player must defeat every other wrestler in the game. Different stipulations can be selected for matches; bouts can either be contested under one fall, first to three falls, or a time limit of differing lengths where the most falls within the time limit wins the match. During the course of a match, boxes pop up showing the referee counting, Tony Schiavone providing minimal commentary, and wrestlers saying a catchphrase after performing their signature move. The wrestlers will also pop out and say their catchphrase on the wrestler select menu.

== Reception ==
GamePro gave the game a generally negative review. They praised several game features and licensing tie-ins such as digitized images and sound bites of popular wrestlers, but were critical of its "stiff" animation and "mediocre" gameplay. They particularly noted that the stiff animations make it difficult to line a wrestler up in order to execute a move. Allgame gave the game a score of 2 stars out of a possible 5. The Allgame website noted the similarity of WCW SuperBrawl Wrestling to its rival games WWF Raw and WWF Royal Rumble, which featured WCW's main rival, the WWF.

== See also ==
- List of licensed wrestling video games
