= Fujisankei Communications International =

American media company

Fujisankei Communications International, Inc.
- Industry: Television, video game publishing (past)
- Founded: October 1986
- Headquarters: New York City, NY
- Key people: Makoto Wakamatsu (President and CEO)
- Number of employees: 79
- Parent: Fuji Media Holdings
- Website: www.fujisankei.com

Fujisankei Communications International, Inc. (FCI) is the American arm of the Fujisankei Communications Group, a Japanese media conglomerate of television and radio channels, magazine, newspaper, record and video game companies. The Fujisankei Communications Group regroups more than 90 companies, like Fuji TV in Japan, among others. Founded in 1986 in New York City and owned by Fuji Media Holdings, FCI makes productions from the Fujisankei Communications Group available to the United States and the rest of the western world.

The company has always been based in Manhattan, but moved from its original offices at Pier 17 Pavilion to its current location on 52nd Street in 1988. FCI has contracts with television stations in New York City, Hawaii and California to air programming segments. FCI also has secondary offices in the United States and Europe.

== History ==
In 1987, FCI launched the Satellite Home Shopping program introducing American products, aimed to combat intense "trade friction" between the United States and Japan, starting with the first broadcast on January 15 and the second in May. These broadcasts, featuring Japanese celebrities were beamed to "three million television viewers in 11 Japanese cities". Sales from the first broadcast totalled US$1.4 million while the second was at US$2 million. As the two broadcasts were "not profitable", FCI planned to start a regular program in September using European and American products.

FCI had 22 offices worldwide in 1990.

FCI was involved with videogame publishing as well, being one of the early third-party licensees for Nintendo Entertainment System (NES) starting in 1987. Originally, FCI merely published in North America translations of video games that were released in Japan mainly by Pony Canyon, another company from the Fujisankei Communications Group. FCI was well-known at this time for the many RPG and Adventure games they released for the NES as conversions from PC games, such as the Advanced Dungeons & Dragons and Ultima series. Later, FCI began contracting outside development houses to create original games; examples include WCW Super Brawl Wrestling and WCW: The Main Event, both developed by Beam Software of Australia; Might & Magic III, developed by Iguana Entertainment; and Metal Morph and the Runes of Virtue titles in the Ultima series, both developed by Origin Systems. FCI had a long partnership with Origin, starting when Pony Canyon was hired to translate the Ultima PC games for Japan, strengthening through the conversion of Ultima III, IV and V for the NES, followed by Ultima VI and VII for the Super NES, and continuing through the end of FCI's videogame department; a conversion of Origin's PC game Wing Commander II to the Super NES was in development for release by FCI when they closed their video games division. In the mid-1990s, FCI abandoned video game distribution to concentrate on television operations.

Since 1999, Fuji TV, through FCI, has forbidden foreign TV stations from subtitling its dramas, a practice that is criticized and has alienated some fans of the genre.

== Published games ==
=== NES ===
- Advanced Dungeons & Dragons: DragonStrike
- Advanced Dungeons & Dragons: Heroes of the Lance
- Advanced Dungeons & Dragons: Pool of Radiance
- Advanced Dungeons & Dragons: Hillsfar
- Bard's Tale, The
- Breaktime
- Dr. Chaos
- Hydlide
- Lunar Pool
- MagMax
- Phantom Fighter
- Seicross
- Ultima III: Exodus
- Ultima IV: Quest of the Avatar
- Ultima V: Warriors of Destiny
- WCW Wrestling
- Zanac

=== Super NES ===
- Metal Morph
- Might and Magic III: Isles of Terra
- SimEarth: The Living Planet
- Ultima VI: The False Prophet
- Ultima VII: The Black Gate
- WCW SuperBrawl Wrestling
- Ultima: Runes of Virtue II
- Worlds of Ultima: The Savage Empire

=== Game Boy ===
- Boxxle
- Boxxle II
- Bubble Ghost
- Out of Gas
- Panel Action Bingo
- Tasmania Story
- Ultima: Runes of Virtue
- Ultima: Runes of Virtue II
- WCW: The Main Event

=== Sega CD ===
- Advanced Dungeons & Dragons: Eye of the Beholder

== Unpublished games ==
- Advanced Dungeons & Dragons: Curse of the Azure Bonds
- WCW Super Brawl Wrestling (Genesis)
- Might and Magic III: Isles of Terra (Genesis)
- Wing Commander II (Super NES)

Curse of the Azure Bonds was abandoned due to difficulties during development. The remaining games were in development.
