= Pony Canyon =

Japanese publishing company

Pony Canyon Inc.
- Logo used since 2016

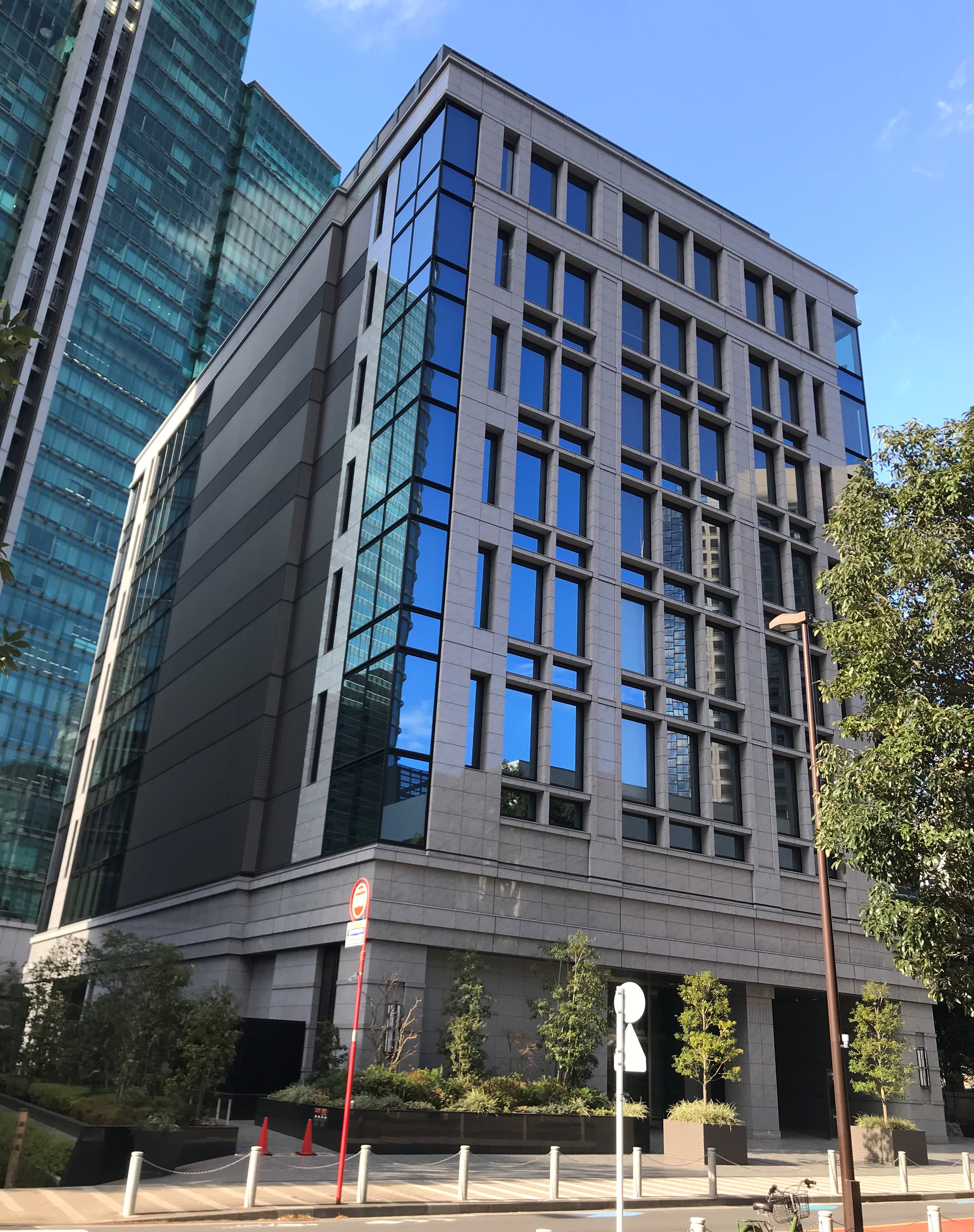
- The company's headquarters in Minato, Tokyo
- Native name: 株式会社ポニーキャニオン
- Type: Private KK
- Industry: Movies, TV shows, music, video games
- Genre: Various
- Founded: October 1, 1966 (as Nippon Broadcasting System Services, Inc.)
- Headquarters: Roppongi, Minato, Tokyo, Japan
- Area served: Worldwide
- Products: CDs, DVDs
- Number of employees: 466
- Parent: Fuji Media Holdings
- Subsidiaries: PCI Music; Pony Canyon Enterprises; Exit Music Publishing Inc.; Pony Canyon Korea
- Website: ponycanyon.co.jp

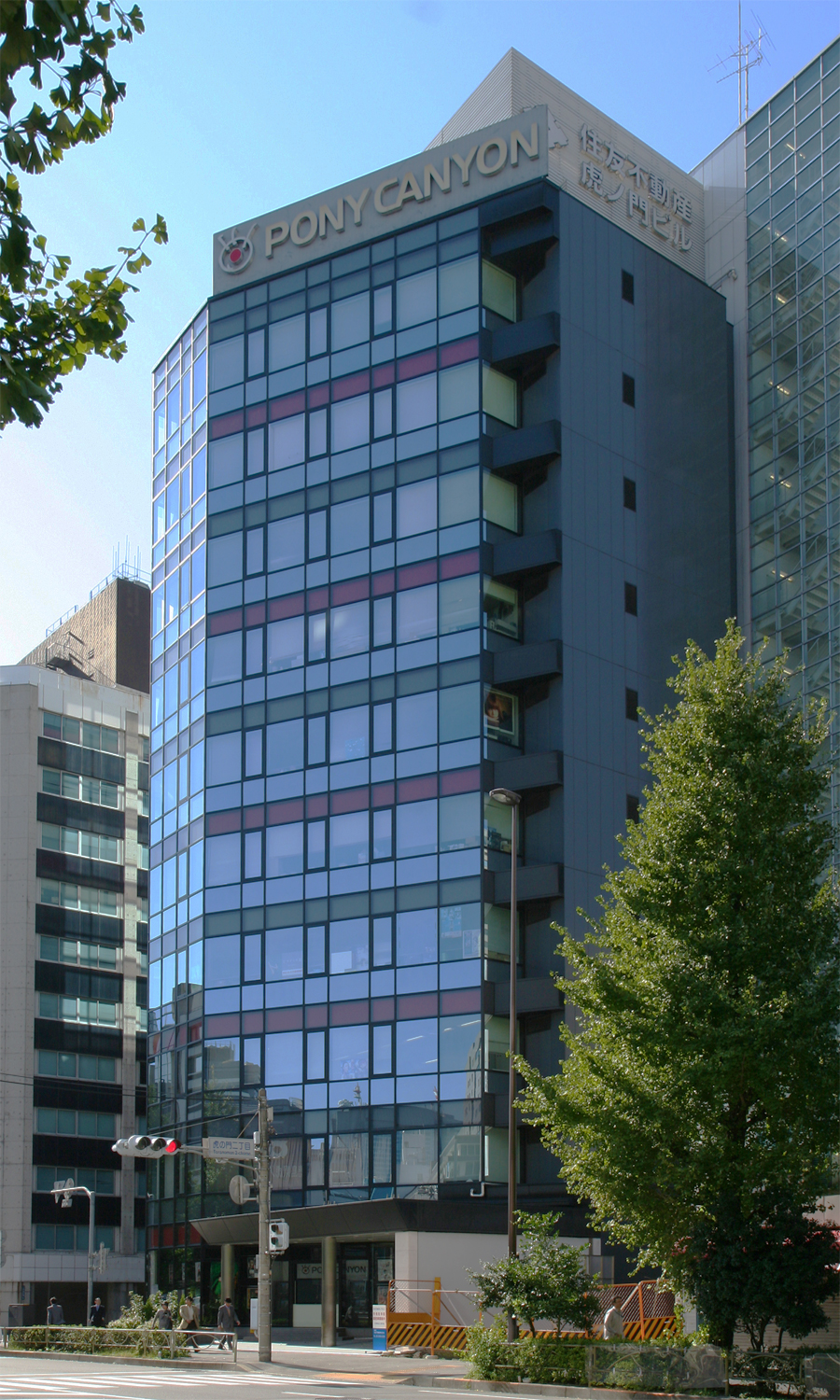
Former headquarters at the Sumitomo Real Estate Toranomon building until 2019.

Pony Canyon logo from 1987 to 2016

Pony Canyon Inc. (株式会社ポニーキャニオン, Kabushiki gaisha Ponī Kyanion), also known by the shorthand form Ponican (ぽにきゃん, Ponikyan), is a Japanese media company, established on October 1, 1966, which distributes music, films, home video, and video games. It is affiliated with the Japanese media group Fujisankei Communications Group. Pony Canyon is a major leader in the music industry in Japan, with its artists regularly at the top of the Japanese charts. Pony Canyon is also responsible for releasing taped concerts from its artists as well as many anime productions and several film productions.

Pony Canyon is headquartered in Tokyo with offices in Taiwan and South Korea. It employs approximately 360 people. Pony Canyon also owns the recording label Flight Master.

== History ==
On October 1, 1966, Nippon Broadcasting System Inc. established a new record label division, called Nippon Broadcasting System Service Inc., in order to produce and market music from Japanese artists. The division formally changed its name in 1970 to Pony Inc. in order to match the brand names it had been using previously. These were "PONYPak" for 8-track cartridges from 1967, and "PONY" for cassettes from 1968.

On August 1, 1970, another Japanese record label, Canyon Records Inc. was founded. Like Pony Inc., Canyon Records was part of the Fujisankei Communications Group. Canyon Records was financially backed at 60% by Pony Inc. and at 40% by Pony's parent company Nippon Broadcasting System.

In 1982, Pony ventured into interactive content by producing PC-based video games and software under the name "Ponyca". In 1984, the company entered license agreements with major overseas companies MGM/UA Home Video, Aya Pro, Walt Disney Home Video, and BC Video (the company also entered a license agreement with RCA/Columbia Pictures International Video in 1986), and, in 1985, it established offices in New York and London. In 1986, Pony signed licensing agreements with A&M Records and in 1989 with Virgin Records to handle both companies' Japanese CD releases.

On October 21, 1987, Pony Inc. and Canyon Records merged their operations to form Pony Canyon Inc.

In 1990, Pony Canyon opened five subsidiaries outside Japan, mainly in East Asian countries. It opened its Hong Kong branch first, known as Golden Pony in 1991, created through its merger with Golden Harvest. A Singaporean branch, catering to the South East Asian market, opened later, followed its South Korean branch, Sam Pony through a partnership with Samhwa Video Production (now operating as Samhwa Networks).

Pony Canyon's subsidiary in Singapore called Skin was managed by Jimmy Wee and signed local English language performers such as Gwailo, Art Fazil, Chris Vadham, The Lizards' Convention, Humpback Oak and Radio Active. Pony Canyon has also had a subsidiary in Taiwan.

Four of five subsidiaries were closed in 1997 due to the Asian financial crisis, leaving the Malaysian subsidiary as the only subsidiary to remain in operation. However, the Hong Kong and Korean operations were reestablished as a wholly owned subsidiary, although the Korean operation had a 16% stake of local partner. In 2003, the Hong Kong and Taiwan branch of Pony Canyon, both affected by the financial crisis, were acquired by Forward Music. In 2018, Pony Canyon reestablished its branch in Taiwan.

As a video game producer, Pony Canyon brought the Ultima series from Origin Systems and the Advanced Dungeons and Dragons series from Strategic Simulations to Nintendo's Family Computer. Between 1986 and 1990, it produced remakes of the first four Ultima titles for the MSX2 and NES platforms. These remakes differed from the original versions, with rewritten game code and all-new graphics. Pony Canyon's video game library was generally released in North America by FCI. Pony Canyon has not released any video games since Virtual View: Nemoto Harumi for the PlayStation 2 in July 2003.

The company has occasionally been involved in film production. For example, it was a co-production company of the 1996 Indian erotic film Kama Sutra: A Tale of Love.

Following a merger with Nippon Broadcasting System, Fuji Television Network Inc. became the major shareholder of Pony Canyon in 2006. The following year, Fuji Television made Pony Canyon its wholly owned subsidiary. Fuji Television was subsequently renamed Fuji Media Holdings in 2008. Despite associations with Fuji Television, not all of Pony Canyon's TV show and movie library has been broadcast on Fuji Television. Some of Pony Canyon's non-Fuji TV catalog includes Doraemon movies.

In September 2014, Pony Canyon opened a North American animé distribution label, Ponycan USA, which aimed to license its titles for streaming and home video in US and Canada. Their home video releases will be distributed exclusively by Right Stuf Inc.

On December 20, 2025, it was announced that TOBE joined with Pony Canyon to establish new label RED ON. The label, whose name RED takes the meaning "Resonance", "Expression", and "Destiny", aims to open up new possibilities for artistic expression in the domestic and international music scene. Tobe artist Hiromitsu Kitayama is its first artist.

== Music artists ==
Below is a selected list of musical artists signed under the Pony Canyon label in the past and present.

- +Plus (2009–2011)
- A.B.C-Z
- Aaron Yan
- Agnes Chan
- Ai Maeda
- aiko
- Akari Kitō
- THE ALFEE (1979–1997)
- Alyssa Milano (1988–1993)
- Ami Wajima
- Amy Mastura
- Arashi (moved to J Storm in 2002)
- Asaka Seto
- Asriel (2014–2015)
- Aya Ueto
- Ayana Taketatsu
- B1A4 (Korean idol group)
- Beatcats (2020–2024)
- Babyraids Japan
- Bananarama
- Band-Maid (2021–present)
- Berryz Koubou
- Billie Hughes
- Blood Stain Child
- BTS
- Buono! (moved to Zetima in 2011)
- By-Sexual (1990–1995)
- Casiopea (1995–1999)
- CHAGE and ASKA (moved to Toshiba-EMI in 1997)
- Cherryblossom (2007–2010)
- Cinema Staff
- COMA-CHI
- Combattimento Consort Amsterdam
- Crayon Pop (Korean idol group)
- Cute (Korea only)
- D-51
- Defspiral
- Dreamcatcher (Korean idol group)
- Ebisu Muscats
- eill
- Ensemble Planeta
- Fahrenheit (Japan release)
- Flame
- Funkist (band)
- GARNiDELiA (2021–present)
- Glay
- HALO (Korean idol group)
- Himekami
- Hanako Oku
- Happatai (band)
- Hina Tachibana
- Hinano Yoshikawa
- Hiro Shimono
- Hiro Takahashi (1993–1995)
- Hiroko Hayashi
- Hiromitsu Kitayama (2025–present, under Pony Canyon – Tobe joint label "Red On")
- Idoling!!!
- Jalil Hamid
- Jamil
- Jang Keun-suk
- John Hoon
- Jun Fukuyama
- Kaori Ishihara
- Kana Hanazawa (2021–present)
- Kazuki Kato
- Kikuko Inoue
- Kim Samuel (Korean soloist)
- Kitarō (1979–1981)
- Kokia (1998–1999)
- Kreva
- Kyoko Fukada (1998–2003)
- Le Couple (1994–2005)
- Lead
- Leaf Squad
- LM.C
- Λucifer (1999–2000)
- Maaya Uchida
- Mai Mizuhashi
- Mao Abe
- Masako Mori (1979–2008)
- Marc van Roon (Japan/South Korea)
- Masayoshi Oishi
- Mayumi Kojima
- MC Sniper
- Miki Matsubara (1979–1986)
- Mikuni Shimokawa
- Milky Bunny
- Miyuki Nakajima (moved to Yamaha Music Communications in 1999)
- Naohito Fujiki
- Naoko Ken
- Nature (Korean idol group)
- Non Stop Rabbit
- Official Hige Dandism
- Onyanko Club
- Original Love
- OxT
- Paradise Lost
- Park Yong-ha (1998–2010)
- .Paul Mauriat. (After Philips)
- The Pillows (1991–1994)
- Psychic Lover
- Raon Lee
- Ricki-Lee Coulter
- Roger Joseph Manning, Jr.
- Romeo (Korean idol group)
- Rumdarjun
- S/mileage
- Sam Roberts
- Segawa Ayaka
- Sexy Zone
- Smiley*2G
- she
- Shinji Takeda
- Shinji Tanimura
- Shizuka Kudo
- Show Lo
- Smewthie
- Sound Horizon
- SS501 (Korean idol group)
- Sug
- Suzuko Mimori
- Taegoon
- Takuya Eguchi
- Team H
- TiA (2011–)
- Tsukiko Amano (retired)
- TUYU
- Van Ness Wu (Japanese albums only)
- Watari Roka Hashiritai
- Weather Girls
- w-inds.
- The Wild Magnolias (one release)
- World Order
- Yoko Akiyama
- Yoko Hikasa
- Yoko Minamino
- Yoshino Kimura (1998–2001)
- Yu Yamada
- Yuki Saito
- Yukiko Okada (1983–1986)
- Yuko Takeuchi (one release)
- Yurika Kubo
- Zeebra

=== Composers ===
- Yasuharu Takanashi (Fairy Tail, First series only)
- Masaya Oya/Camellia (Main line Albums only)

== Video games ==
Below is a selected list of video games either developed or published by the Pony Canyon label.

- Attack Animal Gakuen
- Bubble Ghost
- Dr. Chaos
- Final Justice
- Hydlide
- Jungle Wars 2 – Kodai Mahou Ateimos no Nazo
- Kabuki-chou Reach Mahjong: Toupuusen
- Lunar Pool
- Onita Atsushi FMW
- Onyanko Town
- Penguin Land
- Phantom Fighter
- Pitfall! (Japan-exclusive)
- Shiroi Ringu he
- Spy Daisakusen
- Super Pitfall
- Tasmania Story
- Ultima I: The First Age of Darkness
- Ultima II: The Revenge of the Enchantress
- Ultima III: Exodus
- Ultima IV: Quest of the Avatar
- Ultima: Runes of Virtue
- Ultima: Runes of Virtue II
- Zanac

== Anime ==
Below is a list of anime series licensed for streaming and home video release in North America by Pony Canyon's Ponycan USA label.

- Clean Freak! Aoyama kun
- Cute High Earth Defense Club Love! (Seasons 1 & 2)
- Days
- Denkigai no Honya-san
- Etotama
- Garakowa: Restore the World
- Kuromukuro (Netflix original)
- Lance N' Masques
- The Lost Village
- Rokka: Braves of the Six Flowers
- Sanrio Boys
- Sound! Euphonium (Seasons 1 & 2, expired)
- Welcome to the Ballroom
- Yuki Yuna Is a Hero

== See also ==
- List of record labels
- Master of Entertainment
