= D-51 =

Japanese pop band

D-51 ディー・ゴー・イチ (Japanese)
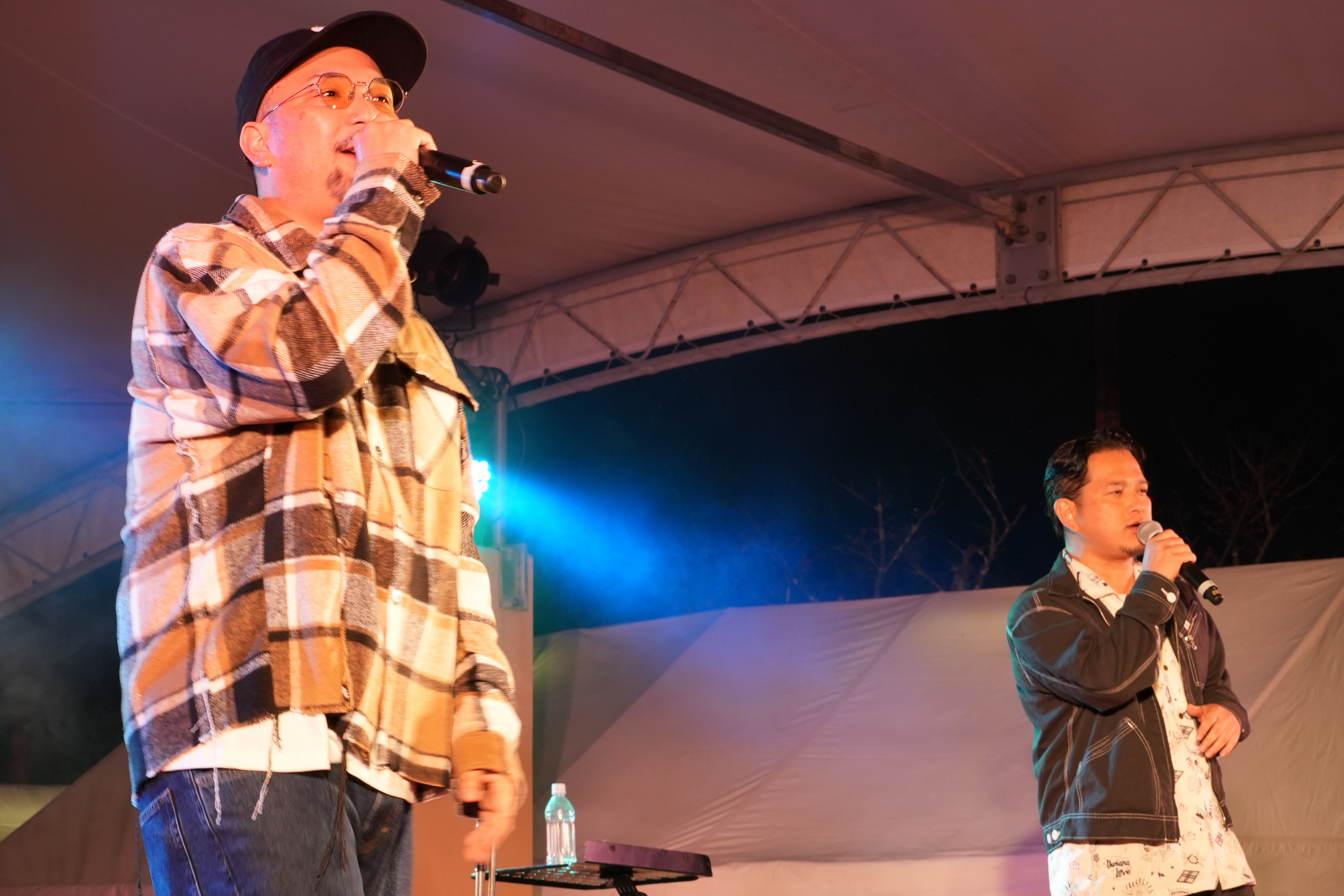

Background information
- Origin: Okinawa Prefecture, Japan
- Genre: Japanese Pop
- Years active: 2003–present
- Label: Pony Canyon
- Members: Yū Uezato; Yasuhide Yoshida
- Website: D-51 Official Website (in Japanese)

D-51 (ディー・ゴー・イチ, Dī Gō Ichi) is a Japanese pop music band. D-51 is group consisting of two men, Yu and Yasu. They are signed under Pony Canyon label. According to its members, the name D-51 came from Japanese National Railways' D51 steam locomotive class.

In 2005, they had their first big hit with the single No More Cry, which peaked at no. 5 on Oricon charts and became the 13th best selling single of the year, selling 402,034 copies. In 2006, their single "Brand New World" was used as the sixth opening theme for the One Piece anime

== Members ==
- Yu: born Yū Uezato (上里優 Uezato Yū) on November 9, 1983, in Ginowan, Okinawa Prefecture, Japan.
- Yasu: born Yasuhide Yoshida (吉田安英 Yoshida Yasuhide) on April 6, 1982, in Naha, Okinawa Prefecture, Japan.

== Discography ==
=== Singles ===
List of singles, with selected chart positions
Year	Title	Oricon		Album
Year	Title	Peak position	Weeks charted	Album
2003	"Let's Try"	–	–	
2004	"Top of the Summer"	–	–	
2004	"Dreamin' On"	–	–	
2005	"No more cry"	2	28	
2005	"Hibiscus" (ハイビスカス Haibisukasu)	–	–	
2005	"Always"	23	8	
2006	"Brand New World"	15	11	
2006	"Hajimaru" (はじまる)	88	1	
2007	"Forever Friends"	67	2	
2007	"Stand Up!"	110	1	
2008	"Sepia" (セピア)	135	1	
2008	"Travelers of Life"	85	2	
2009	"Road" (ロード)	172	1	
2009	"Lady Don't Cry"	110	1	
2010	"Familia" (ファミリア)	50	3	
2012	(めぐり逢い)	148	1	

=== Albums ===
List of albums, with selected chart positions
Year	Title	Catalogue Number (Japan)	Oricon		Notes
Year	Title	Catalogue Number (Japan)	Peak position	Weeks charted	Notes
2004	Street Breeze	FLHO-101	–	–	Mini-album; Track listing: 1. Let's Try; 2. Lonely Saturday Night; 3. Crazy Love; 4. Dancin' in the Street; 5. Futari; 6. Let's Try (original karaoke)
2005	Oneness	PCCA-02251	–	–	Track listing: 1. Top of the Summer; 2. No More Cry (Smile Power Mix); 3. My favorite island (message); 4. Kaze no Melody (風のメロディー Melody of the Wind); 5. Million Night; 6. Born singer×2 (message); 7. Kibō Clap (希望クラップ Clap for Hope); 8. Kōsotori (コウノトリ Stork); 9. Life is music (message); 10. Believer; 11. Another Day; 12. Harmony; 13. We are ready! (message); 14. Let's Try (street band version)
2006	2gether	PCCA-02551	39	3	Track listing: 1. Shall We Nori Nori? (SHALL WE ノリノリ? Shall We Get Wild?); 2. Dance Around; 3. Hibiscus (ハイビスカス Haibisukasu); 4. Missing You; 5. Donna ni (どんなに How); 6. Ore Tomo (オレトモ With Me); 7. Survivor (サヴァイバー Savaibaa) (Beat Patrol Mix); 8. Bacchanale Time (バッカナル TIME Bakkanaru Taimu); 9. Anata e ~ A Song for You (あなたへ ～ A SONG FOR YOU To You ~ A Song for You); 10. Hopeful Days; 11. Always
2007	Mitsu Yoko Ichi Mura (三横一村 Three Sides, One Village)	PCCA-02951	108	2	Track listing: 1. Ohanami Shite~na (お花見して～な I wanna do Hanami...); 2. 3rd Time's Luck; 3. Hajimaru (はじまる Start); 4. Forever Friends (album mix); 5. Ganbare (願晴れ Wish for Sun); 6. Hadaka no Ōsama (裸の王様 The Naked King); 7. No Work, No Holiday; 8. Last Scene (ラストシーン Rasuto Shiin) (album mix); 9. Brand New World; 10. Stay with me (acoustic live recording); 11. Hopeful Days (acoustic live recording)
2009	Daisy	PCCA-03351	296	1	Track listing: 1. Daisy; 2. The life is dramatic 3. Road (ロード); 4. Manon (マノン); 5. and i love you 6. Hitori ja nai (ひとりじゃない); 7. Love; 8. Another sky 9. Play on!; 10. Travelers Of Life; 11. Fight (ファイト); 12. Kiseki wa deai mata sore he (奇跡は出会いまたそれへ); 13. LOVE SONG; 14. Tokyo (東京)
2010	Star	PCCA-03651	271	1	Track listing: 1. GOLDEN TIME; 2. BEAT; 3. Lady Don't Cry; 4. Step & Go; 5. Hitorikiri no Christmas (ひとりきりのクリスマス); 6. Midnight Train; 7. Akogare (あこがれ); 8. fall in love 9. Perfect World (FUJIMINO MIX); 10. Tabidachi no Kaze (旅立ちの風); 11. Familia (ファミリア); 12. STAR
2008	Best of D-51	PCCA-03251	50	3	Compilation album Track listing: 1. Top of Summer; 2. Dreamin' on 3. No More Cry; 4. Hibiscus (ハイビスカス Haibisukasu); 5. Always; 6. Brand New World; 7. Hajimaru (はじまる Start); 8. Forever Friends; 9. Stand Up !; 10. Sepia (セピア); 11. Great Man (Yasu solo); 12. Sayonara to Namida (さよならと涙 Goodbye and Tears) (Yu solo); 13. Lonely Saturday Night; 14. Hikō Shōnen-ki (飛行少年紀 Flying Youth); 15. Life
2011	Yet The Earth Does Move	FLHO-106			Mini-album
