= Reborn! season 4 =

Reborn!
- Season 4
- Cover of Reborn!'s DVD Burn.1 volume released by Marvelous Entertainment.
- No. of episodes: 28

Release
- Original network: TV Tokyo
- Original release: March 15 – September 27, 2008

Season chronology
- ← Previous; Season 3 Next → Season 5

The fourth season of the Reborn! anime television series compiles episodes 74 through 101, which aired in Japan from March 15, 2008, to September 27, 2008, on TV Tokyo. Titled as Katekyō Hitman Reborn! in Japan, the Japanese television series was directed by Kenichi Imaizumi, and produced and animated by Artland. The plot, based on the Reborn! manga by Akira Amano, follows how Tsunayoshi "Tsuna" Sawada, the candidate to be the Mafia boss of the Vongola Famiglia, and his friends are accidentally sent to the future nearly 10 years later. As they arrive, they discover that the Millefiore Mafia family has been annihilating the Vongola.

Four pieces of theme musics are used for the episodes: one opening theme and three ending themes. The opening theme is "88" by LM.C, which is used throughout the entire season. The first ending theme is "Stand Up!" by Lead, which is used until episode 76. This is followed by "Ameato" by w-inds. until episode 89, and then "Cycle" by Cherryblossom until episode 101.

Marvelous Entertainment released the season into seven DVD compilations labeled as "Burn" volumes, with each containing four episodes. Burn.1 was released on September 17, 2008. The final volume of the season, Burn.7, was released on March 18, 2009. On March 21, 2009, Japan's d-rights production company collaborated with the anime-streaming website called Crunchyroll in order to begin streaming subbed episodes of the Japanese-dubbed series worldwide. New episodes are available to everyone a week after its airing in Japan.

== Episode list ==
No. overall	No. in season	Title	Original release date
74	1	"The World 10 Years Later"; Transliteration: "Jūnen-go no Sekai" (Japanese: 10年後の世界)	March 15, 2008
Reborn is hit by Lambo's ten-year bazooka and sent into the future. The strange thing is nobody came in his place. Thus Tsuna Sawada tries to make Adult Lambo appear by taking Lambo's bazooka and firing it at him in order to explain what had happened, but results in Tsuna to be accidentally shot in the process. He then appears in the world ten years in the future. Hayato Gokudera also appears and soon realize they are not being sent back after the usual time limit. They are then attacked by Lal Mirch who is later revealed to be an ally.
75	2	"Secret Base"; Transliteration: "Ajito" (Japanese: アジト)	March 22, 2008
Tsuna and Gokudera venture with Lal Mirch in the woods. They come across a dangerous machine called a Mosca Robot. The future Takeshi Yamamoto defeats the robot and leads them into the hideout where they find out the truth and the secrets. There, Tsuna meets Reborn.
76	3	"Search for the Guardians"; Transliteration: "Shugosha Sagashi" (Japanese: 守護者探し)	March 29, 2008
Tsuna, Gokudera and Future Yamamoto goes out of the hideout and to the outside. They try to find Kyoya Hibari, but runs into the future forms of Lambo and I-Pin protecting Haru Miura and Kyoko Sasagawa from two Millefiore Family members from Blackspell. Just as Future Yamamoto is about to defeat them, a cloud of purple smoke appears and the past forms of Yamamoto, Lambo, I-Pin, Haru and Kyoko appear.
77	4	"Flame of Resolve"; Transliteration: "Kakugo no Honō" (Japanese: 覚悟の炎)	April 5, 2008
Yamamoto is knocked unconscious by the Millefiore members while trying to protect everyone. Gokudera uses his ring and opens his box weapon to reveal a cannon. He defeats one of the Millefiore Blackspell members. While protecting Kyoko, Tsuna manages to defeat the second Millefiore member by using his Zero Point Break Through technique but is greatly injured protecting her.
78	5	"Clues to The Past"; Transliteration: "Kako e no Tegakari" (Japanese: 過去への手がかり)	April 12, 2008
While recovering from their injuries, Tsuna learns the only way to return to the past is to gather the guardians, defeat Byakuran and eliminate the man with the glasses, Shoichi Irie. Lal Mirch teaches Tsuna, Yamamoto, and Gokudera about the rings and boxes; The rings are revealed to emit a flame depending on the element of the user and boxes contain weapons or animals enchanted by those flames. Lal Mirch asks Tsuna to open a box of an unknown element as the sky flame is able to open boxes of all elements.
79	6	"The First Trial"; Transliteration: "Saisho no Shiren" (Japanese: 最初の試練)	April 19, 2008
Tsuna manages to open the box given to him by Lal Mirch to reveal an Arcobaleno Pacifier, but made of stone. When the base receives a SOS signal, it is found to be from Hibird. Kyoko is also revealed to have run away from the base in search of her brother in the future.
80	7	"Discord"; Transliteration: "Fukyō Waon" (Japanese: 不協和音)	April 26, 2008
Tsuna and Lal Mirch search for Kyoko, while Gokudera and Yamamoto search for Hibird. As they are searching, Gokudera and Yamamoto encounter Gamma, one of the Six Funeral Wreaths of the Millefiore Family. Gokudera decides to fight Gamma alone without Yamamoto's assistance.
81	8	"Combination"; Transliteration: "Konbinēshon" (Japanese: コンビネーション)	May 3, 2008
Tsuna and Lal Mirch manage to find Kyoko at the house of the Future Hana Kurokawa. During the fight with Gamma, Gokudera is almost killed but saved by Yamamoto. Settling their differences, they decide to work together to defeat Gamma. Yamamoto is knocked unconscious during the battle.
82	9	"The Strongest Guardian"; Transliteration: "Saikyō no Shugosha" (Japanese: 最強の守護者)	May 10, 2008
As Gamma is about to deliver the finishing blow to Gokudera and Yamamoto, the future Hibari arrives to save them. Hibari manages to defeat Gamma with his hedgehog box animal and tonfas, both which are enchanted with the cloud flames.
83	10	"Information Divulged"; Transliteration: "Motarasareta Jōhō" (Japanese: もたらされた情報)	May 17, 2008
When the battle is over, Hibari shows Tsuna and the others the entrance to his base which is also connected to the Vongola base. Once everyone returns to the Vongola secret base, Bianchi and Fuuta arrive to give new information on the Millefiore Family. They reveal the location of the Millefiore base on Japan which is under the Namimori Station underground Shopping Mall. They decide they must train before beginning their attack on the Millefiore.
84	11	"The Long Road Home"; Transliteration: "Tōsugiru Ieji" (Japanese: 遠すぎる家路)	May 24, 2008
When I-Pin becomes sick, Kyoko and Haru decide that Haru should bring her to a doctor. Haru manages to sneak away from the Millefiore and visit a doctor. Haru is later noticed by one of the Millefiore members. Bianchi arrives to try and assist Haru but they both become cornered by the Millefiore member and his box weapon of bees. Tsuna later arrives and defeats the Millefiore member by using the Zero Point Breakthrough.
85	12	"Where's the Base?"; Transliteration: "Ajito wa Doko da ?" (Japanese: アジトはどこだ?)	May 31, 2008
Lambo sneaks out of the base when Fuuta goes out to fix a loose cable. Lambo is captured by a Millefiore member who demands the location of the Vongola base. Lambo uses him to his advantage in order to get some candy. After learning of the kidnapping, Tsuna and Fuuta follow a trail of Lambo's candy and find the Millifiore member with Lambo. As Tsuna gains the upper hand in combat, the Millifiore decides to threaten Tsuna with Lambo's life. Afterwards, Hibari, annoyed by the disturbance in Namimori, easily defeats the Millefiore member.
86	13	"The Most Terrifying Tutor"; Transliteration: "Saikyō no Katei Kyōshi" (Japanese: 最恐の家庭教師)	June 7, 2008
Tsuna's training with Hibari begins. During their battle, Tsuna is trapped enclosed by Hibari's hedgehog box weapon. Hibari reveals Tsuna will die from lack of oxygen if he does not escape. Tsuna, reaching his limit, prepares one final attempt to burn through the hedgehog. He burns a small portion and realizes that small portion is where the Vongola ring was. He realizes his X-Gloves flames must be equal to the Vongola ring's flames to break through. Tsuna collapses from the lack of oxygen. Just then, Tsuna's Vongola ring emits images to Tsuna's head and reveals the Vongola's past crimes.
87	14	"Succession"; Transliteration: "Keishō" (Japanese: 継承)	June 14, 2008
Yamamoto and Gokudera begin their training. Whilst Tsuna is in the spike ball, he has a visions of all the Vongola Bosses and their past wrongdoings. The bosses demand Tsuna to accept the history of the Vongola but Tsuna refuses. The first Vongola Boss, Vongola Primo, accepts Tsuna as the successor to the Vongola. Tsuna then escapes with the help of his upgraded X-Gloves which now emit the sky flames. Continuing their battle, Tsuna grabs one of Hibari's hedgehog box weapon and releases it on Hibari. Meanwhile, Chrome is shown to be inside an abandoned building.
88	15	"7³ Policy"; Transliteration: "Turi ni Sette" (Japanese: 7³(トゥリニセッテ))	June 21, 2008
Hibari decides to let Tsuna live, wanting to fight Tsuna when he is finished training. The history of boxes is explained thoroughly by Hibari. Whilst explaining, Bianchi is also explaining everything she knows to Gokudera. It is said that the boxes were made because of coincidence and sold at extremely low prices. There are more than three hundred designs. Meanwhile, Byakuran reveals the 7³ plan; the 7 Mare Family Rings, the 7 Arcobaleno's Pacifiers and the 7 Vongola Family Rings that will give them the ultimate power. Squad 8 is sent to investigate deaths in Japan.
89	16	"Piano of Sorrow"; Transliteration: "Kanashimi no Piano" (Japanese: 悲しみのピアノ)	June 28, 2008
In this episode, Tsuna and Yamamoto learn about Hayato Gokudera's past. It is revealed that Hayato is an illegitimate child, born of Bianchi's father, the head of their mafia family, and a famous female pianist. It is revealed that she died in a car crash when Hayato is still young. Hayato doesn't find out that she was his mother until years after the crash, but when he finds out, he runs away from home. After learning Hayato's history, Glo Xinia encounters the past Chrome.
90	17	"Gufo di Pioggia"; Transliteration: "Gūfo di Piojja" (Japanese: 雨フクロウ(グーフォ・ディ・ピオッジャ))	July 5, 2008
Glo Xinia immediately attacks Chrome, who is in a state of panic and confusion due to suddenly being transported 10 years into the future. Just as the battle seems to be in Glo's favor, it is suddenly revealed that the Owl weapon that Glo has been using is actually possessed by Mukuro Rokudo.
91	18	"What You Believe In"; Transliteration: "Shinjiru Mono" (Japanese: 信じるもの)	July 12, 2008
With no escape routes available, and Mukuro Rokudo being in a weakened state, Mukuro explains to Chrome Dukuro that it is up to her to win the fight. Drawing power from both her trust in Mukuro and the Vongola Ring, Chrome's illusions become far more effective, to where even Glo can't tell whether or not they are real. The fight soon concludes in a victory for Chrome, and the Future Ryohei Sasagawa appears.
92	19	"Your Choice"; Transliteration: "Yudanerareta Sentaku" (Japanese: 委ねられた選択)	July 19, 2008
Chrome is brought by Future Ryohei to the Vongola Hideout, and delivers the message to the surviving Vongola family members—including the Varia—along with several Alliance families, are planning to attack the Millefiore family in just five days. With the 7 Guardians finally reassembled, it is up to Tsuna to decide whether or not they will participate in the attack.
93	20	"Level D Security Alert"; Transliteration: "Kinkyū Keikai Reberu D" (Japanese: 緊急警戒レベルD)	July 26, 2008
Due to the Dellinger Phenomenon, the sun has interfered with all signals and has caused technical difficulties worldwide. Because of this, the defenses within the hideout are turned off and the setting becomes dangerous. Reborn explains a little about the Negative Tre ne Sette rays and how the Arcobaleno are affected, and he fears for Lal's life because she is a defective Arcobaleno. She seems to be affected more than Reborn. Meanwhile, Lambo and I-Pin have gotten themselves stuck inside the second power supply room and become blocked in when the backup defenses are turned on. Lambo has destroyed part of the control and the room suddenly becomes dangerously overheated. Finally, it takes Tsuna in his Dying-Will Mode to open the doors and release the children.
94	21	"Identity Revealed"; Transliteration: "Abakareta Shōtai" (Japanese: 暴かれた正体)	August 2, 2008
As Tsuna trains thoroughly for the raid in five days, Lal Mirch is experiencing problems due to the Negative Seven Rays, so she excuses Tsuna to check on Yamamoto and Gokudera. It seems that Yamamoto needs more training, and Gokudera has flaked off from his training. Meanwhile, in Millefiore HQ, Byakuran has found out that Leonardo Lippi is an impostor whose real name is Guido Greco, a man who murdered 15 men and escaped from prison a year ago, similar to that of Mukuro. Byakuran finally reveals that Guido is also Mukuro, and they engage in a battle. Meanwhile, Tsuna finds out Lal's condition and starts to worry, but Lal Mirch lectures him on 'choosing the right hell.' Ryohei meets up with Hibari to discuss the current situation and starts a quarrel. While Tsuna worries about what to do, Lambo comes in and doodles on Tsuna's legs, making him angry and scream at Haru, who apologizes and leaves. Reborn enters and says that Chrome is in deep trouble, as it seems that Mukuro has been defeated.
95	22	"Determination"; Transliteration: "Ketsudan" (Japanese: 決断)	August 9, 2008
Chrome's condition has been stabilized after Hibari tells her it is her duty to live as the Mist Guardian. She uses the Vongola Ring and creates incomplete organs, barely enough to keep her alive. Tsuna, after examining the situation, tells them the raid will begin in five days.
96	23	"X BURNER"; Transliteration: "Ikusu Bānā" (Japanese: X(イクス)バーナー)	August 23, 2008
Tsuna apologizes to Haru and Lambo and thanks to them, figures out that behind power, is support. Tsuna tries to release a "hard flame" with "soft flame" supporting him, but fails because he can not find the balance. While unconscious after blasting into a wall, Tsuna and Chrome are sent into dreams by Mukuro of a strange white "machine". Gokudera has finally mastered the Systema C.A.I. and finding a small cat in one of the boxes.
97	24	"The Great Chase"; Transliteration: "Daitsuiseki" (Japanese: 大追跡)	August 30, 2008
Gokudera's kitten box weapon dashes off and Gokudera makes chase. The recap shows Gokudera and Tsuna in the future arc starting with episode 74.
98	25	"Declaration of War"; Transliteration: "Sengen" (Japanese: 宣言)	September 6, 2008
Byakuran calls Irie and tells him that Mukuro has been defeated and that he was found to be transmitting data, possibly to the Vongola Tenth. Byakuran tells Irie that he is the most important person in that base and must escape if they invade the base. Irie can't leave for some hidden reason. Irie calls all the Milliefore Japan members in the base and tells them he shall be leading the base now. The members are outraged and prepare to attack Irie until a swordsman by the name of Genkishi tells them anyone who opposes master Irie will be killed. Irie becomes the boss of the base. Afterwards, the Vongola have received the data transmitted by Mukuro. In it was the picture of the white box Tsuna saw in his dreams. Training is resumed and Reborn gives Yamamoto a box about the sword emperor.
99	26	"The Final Trial"; Transliteration: "Saishū Shiren" (Japanese: 最終試練)	September 13, 2008
Yamamoto watches DVDs of Squalo's swordsman battles in order to learn from them. Tsuna's training with Hibari continues, this time, he tries to use his Vongola Gloves to fire off flames. Yamamoto manages to create a tenth technique for the Shigure no Shouen Style. Yamamoto's training is complete.
100	27	"The Night Before the Raid"; Transliteration: "Totsunyū Zenya" (Japanese: 突入前夜)	September 20, 2008
Yamamoto and Gokudera have finished their training. Meanwhile, Tsuna loses his charm made by Kyoko. Later, he bumps into her and she gives him it back, then the first black spell battle is recapped. Also, Hibari reveals that the Millefiore battle simulation reveals a 0.0024% chance of success for Vongola. Thanks to Glo Xinia, Millefiore now knows where the Vongola Base is.
101	28	"Night Attack"; Transliteration: "Yashū" (Japanese: 夜襲)	September 27, 2008
Tsuna and the others prepare for their attack the next day. They've been given Marmon covers on their rings which will hide them, dying will resistant clothing, and a communication system. Meanwhile the Millefiore digs their way underground and ends up at where the transmitter was. It turns out Hibari noticed the transmitter and carried it there to lure the Millefiore members away from the base.
