= Reborn! season 7 =

Reborn!
- Season 7
- The cover of the first DVD compilation for season seven of Reborn! released by Marvelous Entertainment.
- No. of episodes: 24

Release
- Original network: TV Tokyo
- Original release: October 10, 2009 – March 27, 2010

Season chronology
- ← Previous; Season 6 Next → Season 8

The seventh season of the Reborn! anime television series compiles episodes that aired from October 10, 2009, to March 27, 2010, on TV Tokyo. Titled as Katekyō Hitman Reborn! in Japan, the Japanese television series is directed by Kenichi Imaizumi, and produced and animated by Artland. The plot, based on the Reborn! manga by Akira Amano, follows Tsuna Sawada, the future boss of the infamous Vongola Mafia family and the battle against the Milliefiore family. In the DVD release, the season is named The Choice Battle. Each of its volumes are labeled "Choice" and the first was released on May 28, 2010, in Japan with five more DVDs slated for release.

Three pieces of theme musics are used for the episodes: one opening theme and two ending themes. The opening theme is "Funny Sunny Day" by SxOxU. The first ending theme is "Yume no Manual" (夢のマニュアル, lit. Dream Manual) by Cherryblossom until episode 165. The second ending theme is "Gr8 Story" by Sug for the rest of the season.

On March 21, 2009, Japan's d-rights production company collaborated with the anime-streaming website called Crunchyroll in order to begin streaming subbed episodes of the Japanese-dubbed series worldwide. New episodes are available to everyone a week after its airing in Japan.

== Episode list ==
| No. overall | No. in season | Title | Original release date |
|---|---|---|---|
| 154 | 1 | "To the Next Battle"; Transliteration: "Tsugi Naru Tatakai e" (Japanese: 次なる戦いへ) | October 10, 2009 |
Reborn recaps the events occurring between of the Vongola's invasion of the Millefiore base to Tsuna's battle against Genkishi and the revelation of Shoichi Irie.
| 155 | 2 | "The Real Six Funeral Wreaths"; Transliteration: "Riaru Roku Chōka" (Japanese: 真(リアル)6弔花) | October 17, 2009 |
Bianchi takes Kyoko and Haru to the Vongola base while leaving Tsuna and his guardians to discuss the upcoming battles with Shoichi. Byakuran sends a holographic image stating he wants to have an official battle between the Vongola and the Milliefiore in a battle of Choice. He reveals to Irie that the Funeral Wreaths and the mare rings they wielded were fakes and he had gathered the Real Six Funeral Wreaths in secret from Irie as he had expected the betrayal. Byakuran then activates the teleportation system in the Merone base transporting all but the White Round Machine, and Tsuna along with his friends. Irie reveals that since they have completed the Arcobaleno trials, Tsuna's guardians are given their respective Vongola boxes for the upcoming battle.
| 156 | 3 | "Inspiring Allies"; Transliteration: "Kokorozuyoi Nakama" (Japanese: 心強い仲間) | October 24, 2009 |
After a long discussion, it is decided Tsuna and his friends rest for the first few days before commencing training for the battle of Choice in ten days time. At the Vongola base, a ring signature was caught on radar and Tsuna and his friends investigate. Tsuna and his friends find Basil from ten years ago to be the cause. At the Vongola base, Basil explains he was sent to the future ten days ago and was given a ring, a box weapon, and a book containing information about his situation and orders to assist Tsuna and his friends.
| 157 | 4 | "Namimori Holiday"; Transliteration: "Namimori no Kyūjitsu" (Japanese: 並盛の休日) | October 31, 2009 |
Tsuna and his friends split up and explore the future Namimori. They all coincidentally meet in front of their school, Namimori Middle, and relax in their classroom. Tsuna realizes that to return to their own time, they must defeat Byakuran in the battle of choice. On the roof of Namimori Middle, Hibari encounters the Future Dino who insists on training him.
| 158 | 5 | "A Warm Place"; Transliteration: "Atatakai Basho" (Japanese: あたたかい場所) | November 7, 2009 |
Kyoko and Haru become concerned that Chrome has not been eating, since she is not used to the kindness of others. Hoping to cheer her up, Tsuna attempts to find out more information on Mukuro Rokudo's whereabouts from Irie, but to no avail. During a welcome party for Basil, I-Pin sneaks off into Chrome's room and manages to get her to eat some gyoza. The next day, Kyoko and Haru find Chrome helping out with the dishes, and they start to become good friends.
| 159 | 6 | "For My Friends"; Transliteration: "Nakama no Tame ni" (Japanese: 仲間のために) | November 14, 2009 |
Hayato Gokudera brings a newspaper from the current time from which Takeshi Yamamoto learns about Namimori Middle's baseball team's consecutive losing streak and how the baseball club may become extinct. Yamamoto heads to Namimori Middle and runs into three first year members of the baseball club and offers to train them for the upcoming game. The next day, Tsuna and his friends watch the game. Namimori Middle baseball team becomes discouraged as the mercy rule will be imposed if they can not gain a point. The batter, being one of the three trained by Yamamoto, remembers he should do his best for friends, and hits a home run. Feeling satisfied with the team's progress, Yamamoto promises to help Tsuna defeat Byakuran.
| 160 | 7 | "Gaining Mobility"; Transliteration: "Kidō Ryoku o Teni Irero" (Japanese: 機動力を手に入れろ) | November 21, 2009 |
Tsuna and his friends are assembled to listen to Shoichi's explanation about the upcoming battle which will be played like the game of Choice. He explains that in the game of Choice takes place in a large battle field where two teams attempt to invade the other's mobile bases to defeat their opponents. Irie explains that the large battlefield would require Tsuna and his friends to find a mean of transportation for the battle. Giannini and Spanner compete against each other in an attempt to solve their mobility issue. After many failed inventions, Giannini finds a solution to their problem and presents to them an Airbike, a hovering motorcycle powered by Ring Flames.
| 161 | 8 | "Airbike"; Transliteration: "Eā Baiku" (Japanese: エアーバイク) | November 28, 2009 |
Reborn tells Tsuna and his friends that they must master the airbikes before the Battle of Choice. While Tsuna's friends have quickly mastered the airbikes, Tsuna has yet to grasp the basic. While talking to Kyoko and Haru, Tsuna realizes he must learn how to ride the airbike one step at a time and continue to practice. With the help of his friends, Tsuna is able to grasp how to ride the airbike.
| 162 | 9 | "The Sky Vongola Box"; Transliteration: "Ōzora no Bongore Bokkusu" (Japanese: 大空のボンゴレ匣(ボックス)) | December 5, 2009 |
After they finished practicing on the airbikes, Reborn tells Tsuna and his friends they shall train tomorrow on opening their respective Vongola Boxes. Tsuna's box weapon shakes violently that evening and Tsuna opens it and releases his box weapon. Tsuna's box weapon attacks him and with the help of Yamamoto and Basil, they are able to seal the box weapon back to its box. Dino arrives and tells Tsuna his box weapon attacked him because he opened it incorrectly and comments that the Sky Box Weapons must be used delicately.
| 163 | 10 | "Terror! Turmoil on Base"; Transliteration: "Kyōfu! Ajito Dai Sōdō" (Japanese: 恐怖！アジト大騒動) | December 12, 2009 |
Dino in his room unleashes his box weapon but is accidentally swallowed by it. One by one, Tsuna's friends are swallowed by the box weapon until Tsuna and Basil are the only ones who remain. Tsuna contemplates to destroy the box weapon to stop the menace but hesitates when he realizes his friends will die with it. The box weapon begins to lay eggs and inside are Tsuna's friends who has been eaten by the box weapon. Dino reveals that the box weapon he bought rejuvenates those that it eats. Reborn tells Tsuna and his friends that they will begin to train with their Vongola Boxes.
| 164 | 11 | "Vongola Box, Training Begins"; Transliteration: "Bongore Bokkusu, Shūgyō Kaishi" (Japanese: ボンゴレ匣(ボックス)、修業開始) | December 19, 2009 |
Dino gives each of the Vongola guardians individual training regimes for their Vongola Boxes. Unbeknownst to them however, Haru and Kyoko had eavesdropped on their conversation. Lambo manages to open his Vongola Box, but Tsuna still has trouble controlling his own. Squalo travels to Japan.
| 165 | 12 | "Boycott Declared"; Transliteration: "Boikotto Sengen" (Japanese: ボイコット宣言) | December 26, 2009 |
Kyoko and Haru confront Tsuna and company about what they heard. When Tsuna refuses to tell them anything, the girls start a boycott, refusing to do any housework until they tell them. The boys struggle to do the housework, as well as their training. After talking with Bianchi and noticing Chrome's training wounds, the girls reconsider their decision. Tsuna is tricked by Bianchi into thinking Kyoko is in danger and rushes after her. Although Kyoko decides to end the boycott, Tsuna decides to tell her everything anyway, having realized how selfish he was being. After talking with Kyoko, she helps Tsuna figure out how his Vongola Box works.
| 166 | 13 | "With the Same Heart"; Transliteration: "Onaji Kokoro de" (Japanese: 同じ心で) | January 9, 2010 |
Tsuna tells Haru everything he told Kyoko. Haru is a bit shocked at the scale of everything, but holds in her sadness until Tsuna leaves. Byakuran hacks into the communications system, giving them the Choice battle's date and location, and informing them that they will need to bring everyone who came from the past, including Kyoko and Haru. Reborn lets slip that Tsuna told the girls everything, which makes Ryohei Sasagawa mad at Tsuna, even punching him. Just then, Squalo appears, beats up Yamamoto and takes him away in order to train him. During the six days leading up to Choice, everyone manages to finish their training.
| 167 | 14 | "Day of the Battle"; Transliteration: "Kessen no Hi" (Japanese: 決戦の日) | January 16, 2010 |
As the Real Six Funeral Wreaths prepare for battle, Tsuna pays a visit to Lal Mirch. Afterwards, everyone puts on special mafia suits made from Leon's thread. They arrive at Namamori Shrine, where Shoichi has prepared a base of operations. However, Yamamoto and Hibari have yet to arrive. Byakuran appears, telling them they'll need to provide a massive amount of Dying Will flame energy to activate a teleporter to take them to the battlefield. Yamamoto and Hibari arrive at the last minute and, with their Vongola Boxes, the group manage to produce double the power needed.
| 168 | 15 | "Choice Begins"; Transliteration: "Choisu Kaishi" (Japanese: チョイス開始) | January 23, 2010 |
Tsuna and co are transported to the center of an abandoned city where the battle of Choice is to take place. They spin a roulette to decide which members will participate in the battle. Tsuna's team consists of Yamamoto, Gokudera, Irie, Spanner, and himself, while Byakuran's team consists of Kikyo, Daisy, Torikabuto, and Torikabuto's underling Saru. Before the battle begins, Byakuran explains that each team has a target that must be defeated in order to win the battle; the target for the Millefiore family is Daisy while the Vongola's is Irie. The winner of the battle shall be awarded the Mare Rings, Vongola Rings, and Arcobaleno Pacifiers.
| 169 | 16 | "Sky Lion: Leone di Cielo ver. Vongola"; Transliteration: "Reone Di Chēri Bājon Bongore" (Japanese: 天空ライオン(レオネ・ディ・チェーリ) Ver.V(バージョンボンゴレ)) | January 30, 2010 |
After setting up their base, Shoichi guides Tsuna through the intercom where he runs into Torikabuto. Tsuna is seemingly overwhelmed by Torikabuto's attacks until he releases his box weapon, the Sky Lion Na-Tsu. Torikabuto surrounds Tsuna with projectile attacks and seemingly impales him in a sphere of needles. However, Tsuna transforms Na-Tsu into a cloak and wards off the attack.
| 170 | 17 | "Fateful Showdown"; Transliteration: "Innen no Taiketsu" (Japanese: 因縁の対決) | February 6, 2010 |
After Tsuna defeats Torikabuto with the help of Na-Tsu, Yamamoto encounters Saru. Saru reveals himself to be none other than Genkishi. However, Yamamoto surprises Genkishi with his box weapon Kojiro, merging with Shigure Kintoki to form Asari Ugetsu. His other box weapon, Jiro, changes his three small swords as well.
| 171 | 18 | "Revenge"; Transliteration: "Ribenji" (Japanese: リベンジ) | February 13, 2010 |
Yamamoto defeats Genkishi and incapacitates him. While Genkishi expresses his disappointment for not being one of the Real Six Funeral Wraths and not being appointed as Byakuran's most trusted soldier, Kikyo uses his box weapon and kills Genkishi in front of Yamamoto. Kikyo reveals to Genkishi that it was under Byakuran's order to kill him when his usefulness is fulfilled. Realizing Byakuran's true nature, Tsuna and his friends become even more motivated to win the battle of Choice.
| 172 | 19 | "Kikyo's Assault"; Transliteration: "Kikyō Kyōshū" (Japanese: 桔梗強襲) | February 20, 2010 |
Kikyo reveals that the Funeral Wraths were holding back to entertain Byakuran, who has become tired of flawless victories. Kikyo is able to bypass Gokudera and approaches the base where Irie is currently hiding. At the same time, Yamamoto attempts to break through the barrier to defeat Daisy. Tsuna is trapped in an illusion by Torikabuto, who was revealed to have faked his own defeat.
| 173 | 20 | "Choice Ends"; Transliteration: "Choisu Kecchaku" (Japanese: チョイス決着！) | February 27, 2010 |
Irie mobilizes the base in an attempt to escape from Kikyo. After a long chase scene, Kikyo manages to destroy the base and inflicts a fatal wound on Irie. Yamamoto breaks through the barrier, defeats Daisy and extinguish his marker. Tsuna, having escaped from Torikabuto's illusion with the use of his X-Burner, arrives to find the marker on Irie has been extinguished. However, Daisy regains consciousness and is able to relight his marker, causing the Millifiore to be pronounced the Winner of Choice.
| 174 | 21 | "The Truth about the Future"; Transliteration: "Mirai no Shinsō" (Japanese: 未来の真相) | March 6, 2010 |
As Irie recovers from his injuries, he explains to Tsuna and the others about why is he obsessed with Byakuran. Using Ten-Year-Bazooka ammo he had received from Lambo's family 11 years ago, Irie went to the future and ran into Byakuran. When he revisited it, hoping to change, it awakened Byakuran's ability to retain the knowledge of different parallel worlds. Byakuran used this knowledge to conquer and destroy several parallel worlds. Eventually, the future Irie arranged for the younger Irie's memories to be temporarily wiped for five years in order to gain Byakuran's trust, since the current world is the only one that is not ruled by Byakuran.
| 175 | 22 | "Yuni Comes"; Transliteration: "Yuni Kōrin" (Japanese: ユニ光臨) | March 13, 2010 |
Irie reveals that their world has not been taken over due to his and Future Tsuna's intervention and that the plan to bring their past selves to the future was thought of by Future Tsuna. Byakuran demands the surrender of the Vongola rings after the Choice battle. However, due to Byakuran owing Irie a favor and the opposition of Yuni, the second leader of the Millifiore Family, the Choice match is annulled. Yuni asks Tsuna to protect her and announces to Byakuran she will be defecting from the Millifiore.
| 176 | 23 | "Escape"; Transliteration: "Dasshutsu" (Japanese: 脱出) | March 20, 2010 |
Tsuna and company manages to ellude Byakuran with the help of an illusion made by Mukuro Rokudo and manage to activate the transport device returning them to Namimori. While sheltering at the Vongola base, Tsuna wonders if they can defeat Byakuran.
| 177 | 24 | "After the Battle"; Transliteration: "Tatakai no Ato" (Japanese: 戦いの後) | March 27, 2010 |
After Tsuna and his friends escape from Byakuran with the help of Mukuro Rokudo, Reborn visits Lal and updates her on the events happened so far about Choice. As Lal hears every word, Reborn states now its up to them to protect Yuni from Byakuran and protect the future.
