= Reborn! season 6 =

Reborn!
- Season 6
- The cover of the first DVD compilation for season six of Reborn! released by Marvelous Entertainment.
- No. of episodes: 13

Release
- Original network: TV Tokyo
- Original release: July 11 – October 3, 2009

Season chronology
- ← Previous; Season 5 Next → Season 7

The sixth season of the Reborn! anime television series compiles episodes 141 through 153 that aired from July 11, 2009, to October 3, 2009, on TV Tokyo. Titled as Katekyō Hitman Reborn! in Japan, the Japanese television series is directed by Kenichi Imaizumi, and produced and animated by Artland. The plot, based on the Reborn! manga by Akira Amano, follows Tsuna Sawada, the future boss of the infamous Vongola Mafia family, and his friends as they return to the past to complete the Arcobaleno trials. This season is titled Arcobaleno in the DVD release.

Two pieces of theme musics are used for the season: one openings and one ending theme. The opening theme is "Easy Go" by Kazuki Kato, and the ending theme is "Aoi Yume" (青い夢, "Blue Dream") by Mori Tsubasa.

Marvelous Entertainment released season six on three DVD compilations between February 26, 2010, and April 30, 2010. On March 21, 2009, Japan's d-rights production company collabor anime-streaming website called Crunchyroll in order to begin streaming subbed episodes of the Japanese-dubbed series worldwide. New episodes are available to everyone a week after its airing in Japan.

== Episode list ==
No. overall	No. in season	Title	Original release date
141	1	"Reunion"; Transliteration: "Saikai" (Japanese: 再会)	July 11, 2009
Shoichi Irie tells Tsuna that in order to open the Vongola Box, the Seven Arcobaleno Seals are needed. In order to obtain the seals, Tsuna needs to overcome the Arcobaleno trials. To do so, Irie will momentarily send everyone who came from 10 years ago back home. Chrome Dokuro asks Irie on Mukuro Rokudo's status and Irie reveals that his death was not confirmed. Tsuna and the others return to the Vongola base where they are reunited with everyone else. At the base, Ryohei Sasagawa is filled in on the events that have occurred and Tsuna thinks how he should tell Kyoko and Haru about this and whether they could return to the peaceful days again.
142	2	"The Strongest Seven"; Transliteration: "Saikyō no Shichinin" (Japanese: 最強の7人)	July 18, 2009
Back in the past, the 7 Arcobaleno are heading to Namimori to present Tsuna with their trials. Meanwhile, in the future, Irie is telling Tsuna and his friends the details before sending them to the past. He reveals that although months have passed in the future, only three days have passed in the past. He warns them that they should not tell anyone what happens in the future for fear of affecting it. He also tells them that the Arcobaleno Trials are a week long and must be completed without fail. Using Irie's device, they are sent back in time. Everyone resumes their normal lives. The Irie Shoichi of the past receives a letter from himself that tells him to place the Ten-Year Bazooka under the Namimori Shrine. Hayato Gokudera and Takeshi Yamamoto arrive to Tsuna's house where Reborn informs them that the Arcobaleno trials involve Tsuna's guardians. He then explains the background of each Arcobaleno and reveals they each have a special ability.
143	3	"Trial #1"; Transliteration: "Dai-ichi no Shiren" (Japanese: 第一の試練)	July 25, 2009
The next day, Tsuna's class receives two transfer students, Monta Hariyama and Himeko Hariyama. During the break, Tsuna is attacked by Lal Mirch of their time period who reveals she will be the observer of the Arcobaleno trials. Colonnello appears and reveals he is their first opponent in the trial. Colonnello chooses Tsuna and Gokudera to undertake the first trial. The goal of the first trial is to grab the button on Colonnello's headband. Tsuna and Gokudera are overwhelmed by Colonnello's traps and attacks. Tsuna tells Gokudera that fighting separately will not work and they must work together to defeat Colonnello.
144	4	"The Arcobaleno Seals"; Transliteration: "Arukobarēno no Shirushi" (Japanese: アルコバレーノの印)	August 1, 2009
Colonnello continues to overwhelm the two. He is defeated when Gokudera distracts Colonnello for Tsuna to use X-burner on him. Colonnello gives Tsuna the Arcobaleno Seal, which causes all the Vongola rings to glow simultaneously. Skull makes his appearance and is revealed to be scheming something with Viper. Later, a person pretending to be Tsuna provokes Kyoya Hibari and Mukuro, causing them to pursue the imposter. Tsuna and Reborn are heading to Chrome's hideout to give her some bentō and end up meeting Mukuro and Hibari. Mukuro and Hibari begin their battle against each other.
145	5	"Guardian Showdown! Cloud and Mist"; Transliteration: "Shugosha Taiketsu! Kumo to Kiri" (Japanese: 守護者対決！雲と霧)	August 8, 2009
Mukuro and Hibari continue their battle and Lal appears announcing this is the second trial. Skull calls his pet octopus to combat but Tsuna easily defeats it. Afterwards, he stops Hibari and Mukuro from battling each other and Lal announces Tsuna has passed the second trial, charisma. At night, Monta Hariyama and Himeko Haryiyama are seen plotting a suspicious plan. The next day, Tsuna receives a phone call demanding him to meet the person at school or face dire consequences.
146	6	"Box Weapon Prototype"; Transliteration: "Bokkusu Heiki Purototaipu" (Japanese: 匣(ボックス)兵器プロトタイプ)	August 15, 2009
Tsuna, Yamamoto and Ryohei are called out to Namimori Middle School where they encounter Mammon, who reveals he has Kyoko hostage. Mammon begins Tsuna's trial with a set of riddles which leads them to various locations. The final riddle leads them to Namimori Shrine, where he reveals he did not have Kyoko hostage. Mammon uses a box weapon and releases a starfish to battle the three and is quickly defeated. Tsuna passes Mammon's trial of adaptability and receives the seal. Reborn asks Mammon about his box weapons and the latter replies that the boxes have been showing up in the mafia and he was asked to test them out by the Arcobaleno Verde.
147	7	"Catch the Wind"; Transliteration: "Kaze o Tsukamaero" (Japanese: 風をつかまえろ)	August 22, 2009
Tsuna returns home after completing the trial. The next day, Tsuna receives a letter from the Arcobaleno, Fong, who is also revealed to be I-pin's Martial Arts sensei. The letter tells Tsuna and his guardians to search for him around town. Tsuna, Lambo, and Haru find Fong at Namimori Middle School. Fong's trial is revealed to test Tsuna of his leadership capabilities. Tsuna is required to catch Fon in one hour by using the people at his disposal. Fong is eventually caught by Tsuna with the help of I-pin who had been hiding in the shadows, and passes the trial. I-pin, having spotted Hibari, becomes embarrassed and activates her Pinzu Time Bomb and is thrown out the window before exploding.
148	8	"Two Successors of the Sky"; Transliteration: "Ōzora o Tsugu Futari" (Japanese: 大空を継ぐ二人)	August 29, 2009
Tsuna and his friends discuss who the remaining Arcobaleno are. At that moment, a woman wielding an orange pacifier, named Aria, arrives with Haru and Kyoko and reveals that she will give Tsuna his next trial. Afterwards, she takes Tsuna along with Haru and Kyoko to guide her around town and treats Tsuna like a servant. The girls find Chrome and leave with her to buy some juice. At that moment, Tsuna and Aria are attacked by Verde's men but they are quickly defeated by Tsuna and his family. Aria reveals Tsuna has passed the trial of tolerance and grants him the Arcobaleno seal. Aria shares a quick dialogue with Reborn and leaves. That night, Reborn announces he will be the host of Tsuna's next trial.
149	9	"Reborn's Trial"; Transliteration: "Ribōn no Shiren" (Japanese: リボーンの試験)	September 5, 2009
Reborn tells Tsuna and his guardians to assemble at Namimori Island for the next trial. When everyone reaches Namimori Island, the trial is revealed to be a battle of Tsuna's family against Reborn. Reborn knocks Tsuna unconscious and battles against Tsuna's guardians. While watching the trial, Lal Mirch recalls what had happened when the chosen seven to protect the Arcobaleno pacifiers met for the first time, and reveals that Reborn was the strongest of them. Tsuna regains consciousness after the defeat of his guardians and engages Reborn in battle. During the battle, Reborn reminisces on the day he became an Arcobaleno. Tsuna gains the advantage over Reborn, hesitates to use the X-Burner and is defeated. Reborn then announces Tsuna has failed his trial.
150	10	"A Path is Closed Off"; Transliteration: "Tozasareta Michi" (Japanese: 閉ざされた道)	September 12, 2009
While Tsuna's family is recuperating, Verde completes the first stage for his box weapons and decides to seek out the Vongola Rings to help him complete the second stage. All of the Arcobaleno, except Verde, gather at Namimori Shrine to discuss about the trials. Tsuna, Gokudera, Yamamoto, and Ryohei discuss about their battle with Reborn and how they lacked resolve in the trial which caused their defeat. At that moment, Verde sends his inventions to attack the Vongola Ring holders. Reborn announces to Colonnello and Lal Mirch that Verde has broken the Arcobaleno pact and must be stopped.
151	11	"Once the Rainbow is Complete"; Transliteration: "Niji no Sorō Toki" (Japanese: 虹のそろう時)	September 19, 2009
Verde sends out robots to seek the Tsuna's missing two guardians, Lambo and Hibari. Hibari defeats his robot and Fong defeats the robot pursuing Lambo. Soon after, the other Arcobaleno's arrive to investigate the disturbance. Verde reveals he planned to gather the seven Arcobalenos and uses a machine that emits non-trisette rays to restrain the Arcobalenos. Using his robots, he captures the Arcobalenos and takes them to his ship.
152	12	"A Boss' Resolve"; Transliteration: "Bosu no Kakugo" (Japanese: ボスの覚悟)	September 26, 2009
Verde demands Tsuna and his guardians to surrender the Vongola Ring in return for the Arcobaleno's lives. Tsuna refuses to compiles as the rings will be needed for the future battles and declares they shall defeat Verde and save the Arcobaleno. Verde uses a machine and absorbs their flames and uses it to power his box weapons. Unable to utilize ring flames, Verde begins to overwhelm them. Tsuna and his friends regain their resolve and are able to utilize the ring flames to gain the upper hand. When Tsuna destroys the machine emitting non-trisette rays, Verde seemingly kills the Arcobalenos by self destructing his robots. Reborn reveals that the Arcobalenos who were captured by the robots were illusions and that they were waiting until the non-trisette rays dispersed. After Verde's defeat, it is revealed to be a robot and Verde is hiding elsewhere.
153	13	"The Final Seal"; Transliteration: "Saigo no Shirushi" (Japanese: 最後の印)	October 3, 2009
Tsuna, with his Hyper Intuition, feels that Verde is nearby and finds Verde hiding in a nearby island. Verde declares his research is complete after gathering data on the Vongola Rings' Flames and states he will not need the Vongola Rings any more. He gives Tsuna the Arcobaleno seal as he has passed Verde's trial of Intuition. As they leave Verde's base, Reborn tells Tsuna he has passed his trial after showing his resolution to protect his friends in the previous battle and gives Tsuna his Arcobaleno Seal. With all seven seals gathered, Tsuna and his friends meet at Namimori Shrine. Using the ten-year bazooka, they are sent back to the future where Irie greets them and announces they shall train for the battle against Byakuran.
