= Reborn! season 1 =

Reborn!
- Season 1
- Cover of Reborn!'s first DVD volume released by Marvelous Entertainment.
- No. of episodes: 33

Release
- Original network: TV Tokyo
- Original release: October 7, 2006 – May 26, 2007

Season chronology
- Next → Season 2

The first season of the Reborn! anime television series compiles the first thirty-three episodes, which first aired in Japan from October 7, 2006, to May 26, 2007, on TV Tokyo. Titled as Katekyō Hitman Reborn! in Japan, the Japanese television series was directed by Kenichi Imaizumi, and produced and animated by Artland. The plot, based on the Reborn! manga by Akira Amano, centers around the life of Tsunayoshi "Tsuna" Sawada, a timid boy who learns he is the great-great-great grandson of the founder of the Italian Vongola mafia family. Tsuna, who is the only living heir, must learn to become a proper Mafia boss and is required to undergo training from the Vongola's number one hitman, an infant named Reborn.

Five pieces of theme music are used for the episodes: two opening themes and three ending themes. The first opening theme, which is used for the first twenty-six episodes, is "Drawing days" by SPLAY. It is followed by LM.C's "Boys and Girls", used for the following episodes. The first ending theme is "Michishirube" by Keita Tachibana, which is used for the first twelve episodes, followed by the Arrows' "One Night Star" from episodes thirteen to twenty-nine, then Splay's "Echo Again" for the remainder of the season.

Marvelous Entertainment, the Japanese company that handles the DVD distribution of the series, released the volumes of this season with the name "Bullet". Each of them contain four episodes with the exception of Bullet.8 which contains five episodes. The first volume was released on January 26, 2007, while the eighth was released on August 31, 2007. A DVD box containing the Bullet episodes was published in Japan on June 17, 2009.

On March 21, 2009, Japan's d-rights production company collaborated with the anime-streaming website called Crunchyroll in order to begin streaming subbed episodes of the Japanese-dubbed series worldwide. New episodes are available to everyone a week after its airing in Japan.

== Episode list ==
No. overall	No. in season	Title	Original release date
1	1	"What!? I'm a Tenth Generation Mafia Boss?!"; Transliteration: "Ē!? Ore ga Mafia no 10 daime!?" (Japanese: えぇ！？俺がマフィアの10代目！？)	October 7, 2006
A strange infant, Reborn, claiming to be a hitman for the Mafia approaches Tsunayoshi "Tsuna" Sawada. To Tsuna's dismay, he has just been chosen to become the next Vongola boss. Later as a result of Tsuna actions, due to the Dying will bullet, he has been challenged to a duel, in Ken-do, against Mochida-senpai. The reason stated is that this is revenge for making Kyoko cry and all Tsuna has to do is get one point to win.
2	2	"The End of the School?!"; Transliteration: "Ji Endo obu Gakkō!?" (Japanese: ジ・エンド・オブ学校！？)	October 14, 2006
Since Reborn's arrival, Tsuna begins to meet new and strange people. One of those people is Hayato Gokudera, a Mafia member who wants to kill Tsuna in order to become the Vongola boss. Meanwhile, Tsuna is forced to help the volleyball team, including his friend Takeshi Yamamoto, due to his show of strength in the previous episode. After the match he is challenged to a fight by Hayato for the place of the 10th. When Reborn comes he explains that if Tsuna were to be killed by Hayato, Hayato would be in the new 10th in training. Later we learn that the loser becomes the subordinate of the winner. At the end Tsuna gain two new family members for the family, Yamamoto and Hayato, with Yamamoto thinking it's a child's pretend game.
3	3	"Electric Shock! Cooking of Love and Fear!"; Transliteration: "Dengeki! Ai to Kyōfu no Kukkingu!" (Japanese: 電撃！愛と恐怖のクッキング！)	October 21, 2006
Bianchi is an assassin who believes that love conquers all. So, in order for her love to reach Reborn, she attempts to kill Tsuna to free Reborn's schedule. Meanwhile, a young assassin named Lambo comes after Reborn, claiming to be his rival.
4	4	"Ayee! A Girl's Feelings are Destructive!"; Transliteration: "Hahi! Otomegokoro wa Desutoroi!" (Japanese: はひ！乙女心はデストロイ！)	October 28, 2006
A strange girl, Haru Miura, is seen stalking Tsuna. In fact, Haru is actually trying to follow Reborn. In order to "free" Reborn, she tries to drive away Tsuna by force.
5	5	"The Head Prefect's Amusement"; Transliteration: "Fūki Iinchō no Taikutsu Shinogi" (Japanese: 風紀委員長の退屈しのぎ)	November 4, 2006
Just when Tsuna is adjusting to his new life, his school's leader of the Namimori Middle Discipline Committee, Kyoya Hibari, is now targeting Tsuna. Fortunately for Tsuna, Hibari is more interested in fighting Reborn.
6	6	"Ni-Hao Gyoza Fist!"; Transliteration: "Nī Hao! Gyōza Ken!" (Japanese: ニーハオ！ギョーザ拳！)	November 11, 2006
A strange Chinese infant, I-pin, comes to Japan in order to kill Tsuna.
7	7	"Extreme! A Fiery Older Brother!"; Transliteration: "Kyokugen! Moeru Oniichan!" (Japanese: 極限！燃えるお兄ちゃん！)	November 18, 2006
Tsuna finally meets Kyoko Sasagawa's older brother, Ryohei Sasagawa, but things don't seem to go the way he wanted when Ryohei nags Tsuna to join the boxing club.
8	8	"The Experienced Boss Had Love For His Family!"; Transliteration: "Senpai Bosu wa Famirī Omoi" (Japanese: 先輩ボスはファミリー思い)	November 25, 2006
Reborn's former student comes to Japan to visit Tsuna; Dino teaches Tsuna what it means to be a Mafia leader.
9	9	"Life-Shortening Skullitis"; Transliteration: "Inochi Mijikashi Dokuro-byō" (Japanese: 命短し ドクロ病)	December 2, 2006
Due to his overuse of the Dying Will Bullet, Tsuna is stricken with an embarrassing disease called Skull's disease, a fatal disease that speaks your embarrassing moments even after you have died. Unfortunately for Tsuna the disease will kill him in 2 hours if he is not cured. The only person he can ask help from is Doctor Shamal who only cures women. Bianchi lures Shamal around town to get him away from Tsuna so he would die and she and Reborn would return to Italy. While searching and meeting up with Gokudera, Lambo, and Ipin, they catch him. I-Pin becomes embarrassed due to Tsuna's skull disease and explodes, separating everyone. With five minutes remaining, Shamal runs into Kyoko and tries to flirt with that. Tsuna drives himself into Dying Will Mode without the bullet but is stopped before he could attack by hearing embarrassing secrets from his skull. With two minutes remaining, Shamal cures Tsuna who feels sorry for him after hearing that he only spent three minutes with someone he liked in his life.
10	10	"Gahaha! The Exploding Lunchbox!"; Transliteration: "Gahaha! Bakuhatsu suru Bentōbako!" (Japanese: ガハハ！爆発する弁当箱！)	December 9, 2006
Lambo is given a simple task of giving Tsuna his lunch by Tsuna's mother, but when he bumps into I-pin, who was carrying a box of nitroglycerin, a mix up causes things turn for the worse. I-pin realizing the mix up comes to school and holds two exact boxes. Lambo makes fun of her for mixing up the boxes causing her to become embarrassed. She becomes a bomb but is thrown away by Tsuna in Dying Will Mode. One of the boxes drop and Tsuna catches it, and finds it to be his lunch. Later, Bianchi suggests that someone be Lambo's babysitter. Reborn holds a contest and whoever makes Lambo smile will become Tsuna's Right-hand man in the Vongola Mafia. Gokudera, Yamamoto, Ryohei and Haru fails and Tsuna is declared the only suitable babysitter. Tsuna comes home and sees Shamal there holding the box of nitroglycerin and shaking it dangerously side to side mentioning how he found Tsuna's "lunch" hanging on a tree.
11	11	"The Gyoza Buns of Love and Death!?"; Transliteration: "Ai to Shi no Gyōza-man!?" (Japanese: 愛と死の餃子まん！？)	December 16, 2006
One day Haru and Kyoko are on their "cake day", a day where they treat themselves while on a diet. They come over to Tsuna's and share cake with I-pin. I-pin shares her Gyoza buns with them. When Haru and Kyoko eat a Gyoza bun that proves fatal to normal people, Tsuna must find I-pin's master who is in town for the day selling buns.
12	12	"Master's Teacher! Strengthening Program"; Transliteration: "Shi no Kunren! Kyōka Puroguramu" (Japanese: 師の訓練！強化プログラム)	December 23, 2006
Reborn strengthens the abilities of Gokudera and Yamamoto through specially made "training programs", which appears to be more than an exercise course. When he discovers that Reborn and Tsuna seem to be paying more attention to Yamamoto, however, Gokudera feels left out.
13	13	"New Spring! The Hundred Million Yen Contest!"; Transliteration: "Shinshun! Ichiōku-en no Daishōbu!" (Japanese: 新春！一億円の大勝負！)	January 6, 2007
It's New Years and Tsuna and his 'family' has to battle the Chiavorone Family in a traditional Vongola event. Although the losing family has to pay a price of 100,000,000 Yen.
14	14	"First Date!? Hell's Zoo"; Transliteration: "Hatsu Dēto!? Jigoku no Dōbutsuen" (Japanese: 初デート！？地獄の動物園)	January 13, 2007
Tsuna goes to the zoo with Kyoko, and is glad to finally able to be alone with her. Tsuna's ideal "date" does not go as planned, however, as he runs into his friends in the zoo, who are causing all sorts of trouble.
15	15	"Clash! Survival Snow Battle"; Transliteration: "Sabaibaru Yukigassen" (Japanese: サバイバル雪合戦)	January 20, 2007
All of Tsuna's friends show up at school during winter to help him baby-sit I-pin and Lambo. Although, in a turn of events, everyone besides Tsuna seems to just want to have a snowball fight, so Reborn turns it into another one of his staged competitions.
16	16	"Escape From Death Mountain!"; Transliteration: "Shi no Yama o Dasshutsu seyo!" (Japanese: 死の山を脱出せよ！)	January 27, 2007
When Reborn drops Tsuna and his friends off on an isolated mountain, he and others become lost in the wilderness of the mountain.
17	17	"Don't Make a Noise When You're Hospitalized"; Transliteration: "Nyūin Saki de wa Oto o Kese" (Japanese: 入院先では音を消せ)	February 3, 2007
Tsuna is recovering from his wounds from the previous episode and discovers that recovering in peace and quiet isn't possible with not only his friends visiting, but the fact that Hibari is in the same hospital.
18	18	"Poisoned Love Chocolates"; Transliteration: "Ai no Choko ni wa Doku ga Aru" (Japanese: 愛のチョコには毒がある)	February 10, 2007
It's Valentine's Day Kyoko and Haru are at Tsuna's house to make some chocolate, only to his horror to find that they are being helped by Bianchi. Tsuna and his friends have to find a way to get Bianchi away from them before she ends up poisoning the chocolate.
19	19	"100% Accuracy? Ranking Anything"; Transliteration: "Hyappatsu Hyakuchū? Nandemo Rankingu!" (Japanese: 百発百中？何でもランキング)	February 17, 2007
A small kid named Futa bumps into Tsuna. What Tsuna is not aware of is that Futa is a Mafia informant, whose "rankings" are 100% accurate, and this makes him a widely sought-after target, forcing Tsuna and the others to protect him.
20	20	"Sudden Attack"; Transliteration: "Totsuzen no Shūgeki" (Japanese: 突然の襲撃)	February 24, 2007
One by one, students at Namimori High are being targeted by an unknown gang. Tsuna goes to school and finds Hibari going to deal with the threat. Before so, he attacks Shamal sensing his bad intent and is bitten by a mosquito. Later Tsuna finds Ryohei has been attacked. Hibari deals with the leader of the unknown gang, Mukuro Rokudo, and he is defeated due to Shamal's poison from the previous mosquito bite. Gokudera is attacked by a member of the gang named Chikusa Kakimoto.
21	21	"Wounded Friends"; Transliteration: "Kizutsuku Tomo-tachi" (Japanese: 傷つく友たち)	March 3, 2007
Gokudera defeats Chikusa but Tsuna comes and he learns that Tsuna is the Vongola Tenth. Later Yamamoto runs into and defeats one of the members Ken Joshima.
22	22	"Unforeseen Evil Influence"; Transliteration: "Yokisenu Mashu" (Japanese: 予期せぬ魔手)	March 10, 2007
After a quick battle between Bianchi and M.M., Haru and Kyoko have been targeted by the serial killer twins Jiji and Didi under Birds' order. Threatening to kill off the girls, Birds plays with Tsuna and his friends, commanding them to beat Tsuna up.
23	23	"The Final Deathperation Shot"; Transliteration: "Saigo no Shinuki-dan" (Japanese: 最後の死ぬ気弾)	March 17, 2007
With Tsuna running after Futa, the others are left to deal with the one claiming to be Mukuro himself. He proves to be too much for them in the state they are in, so all hope lies with Tsuna coming back in time. However, even if he does, there is only one Dying Will Bullet left.
24	24	"Fighting Back in Different Ways"; Transliteration: "Sorezore no Hangeki" (Japanese: それぞれの反撃)	March 24, 2007
Gokudera runs into Chikusa and Ken and faces them but is defeated. He figures out Hibari is behind a wall and blasts it free, letting Hibari easily defeat the two. Tsuna tries to snap Fuuta out of Mukuro's control and does so causing Fuuta to collapse. Hibari arrives and defeats Mukuro but appears he possessed Bianchi.
25	25	"I Want to Win! Moment of Awakening"; Transliteration: "Kachitai! Mezame no Toki" (Japanese: 勝ちたい！目覚めの瞬間(とき))	March 31, 2007
Tsuna becomes cornered, unwilling to hurt his friends until Leon bursts and reveals some Mittens and a new bullet, the Rebuke bullet. Reborn shoots Tsuna with the new bullet, allowing him to hear others' thoughts and awakens.
26	26	"The End and From Then On"; Transliteration: "Owari to Sore kara" (Japanese: 終わりとそれから)	April 7, 2007
With the new Rebuke Bullet, Tsuna has reached the Hyper Dying-Will mode, allowing him to fight calmly. With the Dying Will Mode, the mittens change into gloves enchanted with the Dying Will Flame. Tsuna manages to defeat Mukuro. Mukuro and his gang are taken by the Vendicare, protectors of mafia law.
27	27	"Eat Sushi to Celebrate Moving Up a Grade"; Transliteration: "Shinkyū Iwai de Sushi Kutte" (Japanese: 進級祝いで寿司食って)	April 14, 2007
After the defeat of Mukuro, life goes on normally and Tsuna and his friends all move up a grade at school. However, none of them are in the same class, so Reborn offers them a challenge to catch him, with the prize being a change of the roster. Later, they celebrate at a sushi restaurant owned by Yamamoto's father only to find they do not have enough money to pay for their food and have to work off their debt.
28	28	"No Way! I Killed Him?"; Transliteration: "Uso! Ore ga Koroshita-no?" (Japanese: ウソ！俺が殺したの？)	April 21, 2007
A burglar comes into Tsuna's room at night, with Tsuna fainting from fear, only to wake up in the morning to find him dead. Everyone must find a way to hide the body or else go to prison.
29	29	"Her Lover is Broccoli?"; Transliteration: "Koibito wa Burokkorī?" (Japanese: 恋人はブロッコリー？)	April 28, 2007
Kyoko's friend Hana is infatuated with Future Lambo and blackmails Tsuna into letting her meet him by threatening to tell Kyoko that Haru is his girlfriend. When Lambo uses the Ten-Year Bazooka, however, something malfunctions and creates a teen Lambo with young Lambo's mind, and to make matters worse, this Lambo escapes from the house.And causes havoc all around the city, like stealing a taxi and driving it dangerously.
30	30	"Hide and Seek on a Luxury Cruise"; Transliteration: "Gōka Kyakusen de Kakurenbo" (Japanese: 豪華客船でかくれんぼ)	May 5, 2007
Reborn invites Tsuna and his mom to a vacation resort, but they first have to ride on a cruise ship to get there. Once on the ship, Tsuna spots some of his friends, who all boarded without tickets, and he now has to keep them from being caught, but first, he has to catch them.
31	31	"Welcome to Mafia Land"; Transliteration: "Oidemase Mafia Rando" (Japanese: おいでませマフィア島(ランド))	May 12, 2007
At Mafia Island, Tsuna fails to prove his identity as the Vongola Family's 10th boss, and is transported to the back of the island where he is given a new chance to prove himself. There, he meets another Arcobaleno, Colonello. Colonello and Reborn put Tsuna through tough training. Meanwhile, another Arcobaleno invades the island with an army.
32	32	"A Shark Showed Up in the Public Pool"; Transliteration: "Shimin Pūru ni Same ga Deta" (Japanese: 市民プールに鮫が出た)	May 19, 2007
Tsuna has to swim 15m in school, but being unable to swim, he is trained by Yamamoto, Gokudera and Haru in the public pool. Everyone has his own method, and they decide to compete to see who can get Tsuna to swim the furthest. Reborn interferes this time with a Vongola dolphin that has a dangerous complexion.
33	33	"A Summer Filled With Debt?"; Transliteration: "Shakkin Mamire no Natsu-yasumi?" (Japanese: 借金まみれの夏休み？)	May 26, 2007
To pay off the damage caused in the previous episode, Tsuna works as a lifeguard with Ryohei, only for them and the other boys to be challenged to a swimming race by older lifeguards. Later, Tsuna and his friends run a stand during a summer festival to continue to pay off their debt, only to have run ins with Hibari, and a group of thieves.
