= Sasagawa =

Sasagawa is a Japanese surname. Notable people with the surname include:

- Hiroshi Sasagawa (born 1936), creator of several anime and manga series
- Ryohei Sasagawa, fictional character in the anime and manga series Reborn! by Akira Amano
- Ryuhei Sasagawa, character in the novel Battle Royale
- Takashi Sasagawa (born 1935), Japanese politician of the Liberal Democratic Party
