= Reborn! season 3 =

Reborn!
- Season 3
- Cover of Reborn!'s DVD Daily Chapter volume 1 released by Marvelous Entertainment.
- No. of episodes: 8

Release
- Original network: TV Tokyo
- Original release: January 19 – March 8, 2008

Season chronology
- ← Previous; Season 2 Next → Season 4

The third season of the Reborn! anime television series compiles episodes 66 through 73. The third season aired in Japan from January 19, 2008, to March 8, 2008, on TV Tokyo. Titled as Katekyō Hitman Reborn! in Japan, the Japanese television series was directed by Kenichi Imaizumi, and produced and animated by Artland. The plot, based on the Reborn! manga by Akira Amano, follows the life of Tsunayoshi "Tsuna" Sawada, the candidate to be the Mafia boss of the Vongola Famiglia, who must fight against a group of assassins called the Varia who wants to get their leader Xanxus to become the Vongola boss. In order to help Tsuna, some of his friends become guardians for the Vongola to fight the Varia.

Two pieces of theme music are used for the episodes: one opening theme and one ending theme. The first opening theme is Cherryblossom's "Dive to World" while the ending theme is Lead's "STAND UP!".

Marvelous Entertainment released the season onto two DVD compilations separated into "Daily Chapter" volumes, with each containing a total of four episodes. The Daily Chapter volumes were released on July 25, 2008, and August 29, 2008, and contained episodes 66 to 73. On March 21, 2009, Japan's d-rights production company collaborated with the anime-streaming website called Crunchyroll in order to begin streaming subbed episodes of the Japanese-dubbed series worldwide. New episodes are available to everyone a week after its airing in Japan.

== Episode list ==
No. overall	No. in season	Title	Original release date
66	1	"Shivering Ghost"; Transliteration: "Furuete Gōsuto" (Japanese: ふるえてゴースト)	January 19, 2008
The battle for the rings has ended and Tsuna is enjoying the peace. Reborn suggests that they have an out-of-season "test of courage." Tsuna doesn't like the idea at first, but he learns that Kyoko is participating and becomes eager to pair up with her. But when he gets to the graveyard, all the participants, besides him and Lambo, are doing the scaring. Tsuna is disappointed, but doesn't want to look like a coward in front of Kyoko. He decides to go into the creepy graveyard with Lambo. The two get separated, and when they meet again, Lambo has switched places with Adult Lambo. But for some reason, there's something a little different about Adult Lambo
67	2	"Vongola-style Open House"; Transliteration: "Bongore Shiki Jugyōsankan" (Japanese: ボンゴレ式授業参観)	January 26, 2008
It's Open House! Tsuna is poor at studying, and for him it’s just a day of terrible experiences. He’s hit with a question he doesn't know the answer to and opens his mouth to give a random answer, but his tutor, Reborn, won't allow that to happen. Reborn is watching from behind the parents to see that Tsuna gets the answer right. But then Lambo and the others come barging in! In the end, the teacher has to leave to carry off Gokudera after he passes from seeing Bianchi. The classroom is unsettled. At that moment, a certain man stands at the front of the class!
68	3	"Happy? Wedding"; Transliteration: "Happii? Wedingu" (Japanese: ハッピー? ウェディング)	February 2, 2008
One day, Tsuna receives an invitation to a wedding ceremony. The names of the bride and the groom are Bianchi and Reborn! It seems that Nana found her wedding pictures the other day, which made Bianchi crazy about getting married. At first, Tsuna is sure that Reborn would never consent, but when he sees Bianchi in a wedding dress at the church he realizes the ceremony is real. Tsuna goes to the groom's room to congratulate Reborn, but he learns the surprising truth from Dino!
69	4	"Crazy Criminal Brother Trio"; Transliteration: "Tondemo Hanzai San Kyōdai" (Japanese: とんでも犯罪3兄弟)	February 9, 2008
Nana's wallet has been stolen. Angered about dinner, Reborn and the other freeloaders step up to catch the thief. Naturally, Tsuna is dragged along. The Sawada family walks through the shopping district with guards around Nana. The group grabs the attention of three men, the Crime Brothers, who are causing a stir in town. The youngest brother was the one who stole Nana's wallet the day before!
70	5	"The Misfortune of Shoichi Irie"; Transliteration: "Irie Shōichi no Sainan" (Japanese: 入江正一の災難)	February 16, 2008
Lambo is beat up by Reborn as usual and is tossed into a neighboring house. The boy living there, Shoichi Irie, goes to the Sawada household to return a box that contains a gifts of thanks from the Bovino Family, the family that Lambo belongs to. But unusual things begin to happen! A beautiful woman sunbathing out of season, a talking baby, an exploding child, and a suspicious black luxury car… Shoichi Irie is confused by the strange happenings and has no chance to return the box.
71	6	"Fighting Spirit! Absolute Evil Fist"; Transliteration: "Kihaku de Shōbu! Zettai Maken" (Japanese: 気迫で勝負!絶対魔拳)	February 23, 2008
A dojo buster has appeared in Namimori. Kyoko and Haru see him in action and are angered at how merciless he is, even against children. They are frustrated that they aren't able to do anything. Reborn tells them that Tsuna will defeat the dojo buster for them. Naturally, Tsuna doesn't want to. But when he sees Kyoko's sad expression, he is unable to refuse and begins training. The name of the technique that Reborn is trying to teach Tsuna is called the "Absolute Evil Fist." But for some reason, Reborn won't tell him what kind of fighting style it is
72	7	"Expulsion Crisis"; Transliteration: "Taigaku Kuraishisu" (Japanese: 退学クライシス)	March 1, 2008
Nezu is a terrible teacher who makes fun of students who get bad grades. On the day he has to return his students’ science tests, he shows the entire class Tsuna's answer sheet, which has received poor marks. Gokudera is angered at Nezu for making fun of Tsuna and confronts him, but Tsuna and Yamamoto stop him from causing any physical harm. Nezu falls over and is angered; he blames Tsuna and his friends for his injuries. He says that they should be expelled. Thanks to Kyoko's pleading, Nezu will forgive them if they retake the science test and get good scores, but…
73	8	"Mother's Day Vongola-style"; Transliteration: "Kāsan Kansha no Hi" (Japanese: 母さん感謝の日)	March 8, 2008
Everyone suddenly receives an invitation from Reborn to attend a Vongola-style Maman Appreciation Day party. Reborn is holding this event to entertain Nana, who is always taking care of everyone. But with a name that includes “Vongola-style,” it can't be normal. At the party, Nana selects a winner by giving points to people who reveal their secret talents. The chances that the winner's wish will be granted is, amazingly, 100 percent! Everyone wants their wish granted, and the Sawada family living room becomes a place for serious battle with greed swirling all around.
