= Reborn! season 2 =

Reborn!
- Season 2
- Cover of Reborn!'s DVD Battle.1 volume released by Marvelous Entertainment.
- No. of episodes: 32

Release
- Original network: TV Tokyo
- Original release: June 2, 2007 – January 12, 2008

Season chronology
- ← Previous; Season 1 Next → Season 3

The second season of the Reborn! anime television series compiles episodes 34 through 65. The second season aired in Japan from June 2, 2007, to January 12, 2008, on TV Tokyo. Titled as Katekyō Hitman Reborn! in Japan, the Japanese television series was directed by Kenichi Imaizumi, and produced and animated by Artland. The plot, based on the Reborn! manga by Akira Amano, follows the life of Tsunayoshi "Tsuna" Sawada, the candidate to be the Mafia boss of the Vongola Famiglia, who must fight against a group of assassins called the Varia who wants to get their leader Xanxus to become the Vongola boss. In order to help Tsuna, some of his friends become guardians for the Vongola to fight the Varia.

Six pieces of theme music are used for the episodes: two opening themes and four ending themes. The first opening theme is LM.C's "Boys and Girls", while in episode 52 it is changed to Cherryblossom's "Dive to World". The first ending theme is Splay's "Echo Again" until episode thirty-eight, then Idoling's "Friend" until episode fifty-one. Two of the anime's voice actors, Takashi Kondō and Toshinobu Iida, provided their voices for the fifth ending theme, "Sakura Addiction", which is used for episodes fifty-two to sixty-two. That is followed by Lead's "STAND UP!" for the remainder of the season.

Marvelous Entertainment released the season onto eight DVD compilations separated into "Battle" volumes, with each containing a total of four episodes. The Battle volumes were released from November 30, 2007, to June 27, 2008, and contained episodes 34 to 65. On March 21, 2009, Japan's d-rights production company collaborated with the anime-streaming website called Crunchyroll in order to begin streaming subbed episodes of the Japanese-dubbed series worldwide. New episodes are available to everyone a week after its airing in Japan.

== Episode list ==
No. overall	No. in season	Title	Original release date
34	1	"The Varia Arrive"; Transliteration: "Variā Kuru!" (Japanese: ヴァリアー来る！)	June 2, 2007
On a day out having fun, Tsuna and his friends come across a boy using the Dying Will Flame and is being attacked by a swordsman, but when they try to help, they prove to be no match for him.
35	2	"The Seven Vongola Rings"; Transliteration: "Vongore Ringu Nanatsu" (Japanese: ボンゴレリング7つ)	June 9, 2007
Dino manages to fend off the swordsman, Squalo, and explains the situation: a subgroup of the Vongola Family called The Varia is after the Vongola Rings which are held by the leading members of the family, which he then proceeds to give to Tsuna and six other people. They have ten days to train in order to become strong enough to fight off The Varia. Meanwhile, Tsuna's father returns.
36	3	"Tutors on the Move"; Transliteration: "Katekyō, Ugoku" (Japanese: カテキョー、動く)	June 16, 2007
Tsuna and the other six members chosen to hold one of the 7 half rings, all start to train, in preparation to face The Varia. Some even get themselves their own home tutors. Meanwhile Tsuna is told that besides him the First Vongola also used gloves, and he will soon find out who the two others with the ring are.
37	4	"Teacher and Student Together"; Transliteration: "Shitei Konbi, Sorō" (Japanese: 師弟コンビ、揃う)	June 23, 2007
All of them are going through training by their respective tutors. Tsuna is being trained by Reborn, Yamamoto by his father, Gokudera by Dr. Shamal, Ryohei by Colonello and Hibari by Dino.
38	5	"The Selfish Baby Cow Vanishes"; Transliteration: "Wagamama Koushi no Shissō" (Japanese: ワガママ子牛の失踪)	June 30, 2007
Under Reborn's instruction, Tsuna embarks on a search to find the missing Lambo. At the same time, Haru is testing Tsuna to find out whether he is still the kind and compassionate Tsuna who had saved her in the river.
39	6	"The Unseen Enemies' Goal"; Transliteration: "Miezaru Teki no Mokuteki wa" (Japanese: 見えざる敵の目的は)	July 7, 2007
A Vongola weapon alteration expert shows up to improve everyone's weapon. Meanwhile, two men appear, aiming to assassinate Tsuna.
40	7	"The Battle of the Rings Begins!"; Transliteration: "Ring Sōdatsusen, Kaishi!" (Japanese: リング争奪戦、開始！)	July 14, 2007
All of the selected one are forced to battle against each other who have the same type of rings.
41	8	"The Guardian of the Sun Ring's Feelings"; Transliteration: "Hare no Shugosha no Omoi" (Japanese: 晴の守護者の思い)	July 21, 2007
Lussuria and Ryohei fight in a heavily lighted boxing arena. Ryohei is being beaten severely by Lussuria but then Ryohei remembers his sister and the reason he became a boxer. He then gets back up ready to fight.
42	9	"The Power to Overcome Adversity"; Transliteration: "Gyakkyō o Hanekaesu Chikara" (Japanese: 逆境をはね返す力)	July 28, 2007
Ryohei continues his fight with Lussuria. When the battle seems to favour Lussuria, Kyoko & Hana appear and give Ryohei the support he needs to release his Extreme Sun Maximum Canon. Later, Tsuna wonders if Lambo can really fight in the next round. Tsuna then talks with Lambo from 10 years later who tells him not to let 5 year old Lambo use the 10 year Bazooka, for Adult Lambo may be from a future parallel world.
43	10	"Thunder Strike from Twenty Years Later"; Transliteration: "Nijū-nen go no Raigeki" (Japanese: 20年後の雷撃)	August 4, 2007
Lambo's fight versus Levi A. Than of Varia. As a 5-year-old and a 15-year-old, he stands no chance to the "Levi Volta" attack of Levi. However, when the 15-year-old Lambo used the 10-year bazooka, Lambo from 20 years later appears. The 25-year-old defeats Leviathan with relative ease using his "Elettrico reverse" and "Elettrico Cornata" techniques, but the 5-minute limit of the 10 Year Bazooka ended, and Lambo reverted to his 5-year-old form. Just as Leviathan is about to severely injure Lambo, Tsuna stops the match in Hyper Dying Will Mode, surprising everyone.
44	11	"The Stolen Sky Ring"; Transliteration: "Ubawareta Ōzora no Ringu" (Japanese: 奪われた大空のリング)	August 11, 2007
Tsuna's ring is taken from him for having interfered in Lambo's fight. Tsuna's father leaves for Italy, after Xanxus hints at having done something to the 9th boss of Vongola. While Tsuna continues his training, Gokudera is trying to perfect his ultimate technique.
45	12	"Raging Storm Battle"; Transliteration: "Dotō no Arashisen" (Japanese: 怒涛の嵐戦)	August 18, 2007
Gokudera fights a losing battle to Belphegor. Belphegor's attacks were somehow going right to him without much effort on Bel's part. However, Gokudera figures out the secret to his trick, and unveils his new technique: Rocket Bombs. However, once Gokudera finally strikes Belphegor, he starts to act strangely.
46	13	"Reason to Fight"; Transliteration: "Tatakau Riyū" (Japanese: 戦う理由)	August 25, 2007
After Belphegor reveals his true nature, Gokudera lures Belphegor into the library for a final stand. After a brief struggle between the two, Gokudera won, but as the time limit for the match expired, it became a struggle match for the two. Not wanting to lose his friend, Tsuna persuaded Gokudera to abandon the ring. Gokudera's match concludes
47	14	"The Strongest, Invincible Style"; Transliteration: "Saikyō Muteki no Ryūha" (Japanese: 最強無敵の流派)	September 1, 2007
The battle for the Ring of Rain between Yamamoto and Squalo is announced. Hibari causes a commotion at the school as the battles have caused major damage to the grounds. Dino reveals that Squalo once defeated the Swords Emperor of the old Varia and that Yamamoto's Shigure Souen Style is useless against him. Yamamoto receives a shinai from his father that transforms into a katana only when using the Shigure Souen Style.
48	15	"Flow of Battle"; Transliteration: "Shōbu no Yukue" (Japanese: 勝負の行方)	September 8, 2007
The battle for the Ring of Rain commences. Yamamoto shows off his new Shigure Souen Style and it looks like victory is assured. But slowly Squalo gains the upper hand as none of Yamamoto's attacks are hitting. He then reveals that he can read through all of Yamamoto's moves.
49	16	"Requiem Rain"; Transliteration: "Rekuiemu no Ame" (Japanese: 鎮魂歌(レクイエム)の雨)	September 15, 2007
Having crushed the Shigure Souen Style before, Squalo becomes confident once more. Yamamoto manages to hurt him with the 8th Form: Pelting Rain, after Squalo revealed he had encountered a different 8th Form. Yamamoto reveals his newly created 9th Form as Squalo bares his fangs. The Shark and Rain collide on this exciting conclusion.
50	17	"The Guardian of the Mist Ring Arrives!?"; Transliteration: "Kiri no Shugosha, Kuru!?" (Japanese: 霧の守護者、来る！？)	September 22, 2007
On Tsuna's side of the world, he is curious to know who is the Guardian of the Mist only to faint at the sight of Chikusa and Ken. At the Vongola Compound in Italy, an attempted recon mission is enacted by Iemitsu to find out what happened to Vongola the 9th. When Tsuna regains consciousness, he and his 'family' find out who is really the Guardian of the Mist.
51	18	"Illusion vs. Illusion"; Transliteration: "Genjutsu vs Genjutsu" (Japanese: 幻術vs.幻術)	September 29, 2007
Having found out that Chrome Dokuro is the Vongola's representative of Guardian of the Mist, Tsuna acknowledges her as a part of the family and allows her to take part in the duel. After many exerted attempts to attack 'Mammon' (now known as Viper of the indigo pacifier), Chrome eventually loses to the illusions. However, the battle does not end and an unexpected person comes in to assist in the battle.
52	19	"The Truth About the Mist"; Transliteration: "Kiri no Shinjitsu" (Japanese: 霧の真実)	October 6, 2007
The unexpected person, turned from Chrome, turns out to be Mukuro Rokudo. A series of chaotic illusions battle starts. During the fight, Tsuna experiences flashbacks of Mukuro on how he sacrificed himself for Ken and Chikusa to escape. Mukuro ends up being the winner, almost killing Mammon, who escaped from the battle field with his reserved power. Mukuro fainted after the battle, turning himself back to Chrome.
53	20	"A Hint of Uneasiness"; Transliteration: "Ichimatsu no Fuan" (Japanese: 一抹の不安)	October 13, 2007
Everyone in Tsuna's family is worried about the outcome of the Cloud battle. If it's Hibari that's fighting, then they should have a one-hit K.O. no-worry win. However, when it seems that the daunting Gola Mosca is more than he appears to be, even Tsuna, who's still training to complete his Zero-Point, gets very worried.
54	21	"The Cloud Guardian's Rampage"; Transliteration: "Kumo no Shugosha no Bōsō" (Japanese: 雲の守護者の暴走)	October 20, 2007
After the Cloud ring conflict, Xanxus tries retrieve Gola Mosca. After Hibari halts his attempt at retrieval, Mosca goes on a rampage, shooting wildly at everyone friend and foe. Back at the 9th's house it is revealed that the 9th living there is in fact a fake. Tsuna comes to the rescue of his friends and holds off Mosca at which time Mosca attacks Tsuna only.
55	22	"Determination"; Transliteration: "Ketsui" (Japanese: 決意)	October 27, 2007
Tsuna opens Gola Mosca to find the body of the 9th who was its power supply. Xanxus is revealed to have been behind a coup attempt. It is revealed that Tsuna has met the 9th before and that he was the true choice for the position of the 10th Vongola Boss. After which the Sky Match is announced for the next night. Xanxus gives the sky ring to Tsuna before he leaves. The 9th is taken for medical attention and everyone returns home. Tsuna returns to school the next day where he receives an amulet from Kyoko.
56	23	"Gokudera's Story"; Transliteration: "Gokudera no Hanashi" (Japanese: ごくでらのはなし)	November 3, 2007
As Lambo wakes up from his coma, Gokudera recounts what has happened during the Varia arc.
57	24	"The Sky Ring Battle Begins!"; Transliteration: "Ōzora-sen, Hajimaru !" (Japanese: 大空戦、始まる！)	November 10, 2007
Everyone arrives at Nami Middle to find Tsuna and Xanxus about to fight. The Cervello put watches on the guardians that poison them and the only antidote is to put the guardian ring in the watch itself. Just before the fight begins Xanxus makes a decisive first strike.
58	25	"Flame of Fury"; Transliteration: "Funnu no Honō" (Japanese: 憤怒の炎)	November 17, 2007
The Battle of the Sky gets started and the strengths of Xanxus and Tsuna are exposed. Not to mention a couple of the guardians seem to be coming around.
59	26	"Supporters"; Transliteration: "Engo suru Mono-tachi" (Japanese: 援護する者たち)	November 24, 2007
All the Guardians have been injected with a poison and rendered unmovable. Hibari, however, manages to help himself and on the way saves Gokudera. On Xanxus's side, Bel and Levi have also been freed. Gokudera rushes to save a helpless Lambo from Levi. Meanwhile, the Sky battle has begun to heat up.
60	27	"Deathperate Zero Point Breakthrough"; Transliteration: "Shinuki no Zero Chiten Toppa" (Japanese: 死ぬ気の零地点突破)	December 1, 2007
Tsuna prepares to use the fruit of his hard training: the Zero Point Breakthrough. Xanxus, however, recognizes this attack and proceeds in a hectic beat down. Reborn reveals that maybe using it to attack won't beat Xanxus anyway.
61	28	"Zero Point Breakthrough Revised"; Transliteration: "Zero Chiten Toppa Kai" (Japanese: 零地点突破・改)	December 8, 2007
Xanxus is firing relentlessly leaving no time for Tsuna to execute his attack. But Tsuna is getting stronger with each hit he takes due to the Zero Point Breakthrough Revised. Meanwhile, Hibari has saved Yamamoto and Gokudera freed Ryohei. Tsuna's family are all saved. Dino arrives at the battle with an unexpected guest and Chrome is being held hostage by Marmon and Bel.
62	29	"Tactics"; Transliteration: "Kakehiki" (Japanese: 駆け引き)	December 15, 2007
Dino's unsuspected guest is revealed to be Squalo, who Dino saved instead of Yamamoto and brings to see the sky match. Yamamoto along with Gokudera propose a trade between Mammon and Bel, which turns out to be a well played trick but is countered by Mammon's illusions which binds both Yamamoto and Gokudera, Gokudera of which drops the remaining rings. Tsuna and Xanxus have a struggle where Xanxus powers up, which seems to turn the tide of the battle. Tsuna and Xanxus then charge at each other which results in a huge explosion. After the smoke clears, Tsuna's Zero Point Breakthrough froze Xanxus's hand; revealing he has mastered the First's technique.
63	30	"Freezing Flame"; Transliteration: "Kōritsuku Honō" (Japanese: 凍りつく炎)	December 22, 2007
As the fight continues, Xanxus tries to break the ice and release his flames. However, Tsuna prevents him and begins to freeze Xanxus' entire body. As Xanxus becomes frozen, he reveals that this scenario is similar to when the 9th Vongola froze him. Squalo finally reveals the whole story of what happened 8 years ago during the "Crib Incident" and how the Varia attacked Vongola headquarters but failed due to the freezing of Xanxus. Meanwhile, Ryohei is shown freeing Gokudera, Yamamoto and Chrome from Mammon and Bel's trap. However, Mammon was able to get all the guardian rings and is seen at the end hovering over the frozen Xanxus saying that all the rings will reawaken Xanxus.\
64	31	"The Truth Behind The Rage"; Transliteration: "Ikari no Shinsō" (Japanese: 怒りの真相)	January 5, 2008
After the fight, Xanxus is released with the power of the 7 rings which he was originally released by from the 9th. There is a short flashback of his life, and a secret is revealed: Xanxus is not actually the 9th's blood son, and so, the rings rejected him. At the end of this, an elite group of Varia arrives.
65	32	"Conclusion!"; Transliteration: "Ketchaku!" (Japanese: 決着！)	January 12, 2008
Due to the timely arrival of Lancia, the elite group of Varia are defeated and Tsuna is pronounced the winner of the sky ring. They celebrate with a party at Yamamato's house.
