= Reborn! season 5 =

Reborn!
- Season 5
- Cover from the DVD X-Burn.1 released by Marvelous Entertainment.
- No. of episodes: 39

Release
- Original network: TV Tokyo
- Original release: October 4, 2008 – July 4, 2009

Season chronology
- ← Previous; Season 4 Next → Season 6

The fifth season of the Reborn! anime television series compiles episodes 102 through 140 that aired between October 4, 2008, and July 4, 2009, on TV Tokyo. Titled as Katekyō Hitman Reborn! in Japan, the Japanese television series is directed by Kenichi Imaizumi, and produced and animated by Artland. The plot, based on the Reborn! manga by Akira Amano, follows Tsunayoshi "Tsuna" Sawada, the future boss of the infamous Vongola Mafia family, and his friends after they are sent into the future. In this future, nearly ten years after their own time, they are faced with the Millefiore Family, a threat to the Vongola and the world. This season begins with the main characters invading a Millefiore base.

Six pieces of theme music are used for the episodes: two opening themes and four ending themes. The opening themes are Masami Mitsuoka's "Last Cross", used from episode 102 to 126, and "Easy Go" by Kazuki Kato from episode 127. The ending themes are "Suberidai" (すべり台, lit. "Slide") by Mori Tsubasa, used from episode 102 to 114, Cherryblossom's Sakura Rock (桜ロック, Sakura Rokku) from episode 115 to 126, "Smile for..." by Aya Ueto from episode 127 to 139, then "Aoi Yume" (青い夢, lit. Blue Dream") by Mori Tsubasa for the rest of the season.

Marvelous Entertainment has released the season into ten DVD compilations labeled as "X-Burn" volumes between April 24, 2009, and January 29, 2010. On March 21, 2009, Japan's d-rights production company collaborated with the anime-streaming website called Crunchyroll in order to begin streaming subbed episodes of the Japanese-dubbed series worldwide. New episodes are available to everyone a week after its airing in Japan.

== Episode list ==
No. overall	No. in season	Title	Original release date
102	1	"Mission Start"; Transliteration: "Sakusen Kaishi" (Japanese: 作戦開始)	October 4, 2008
Hibari starts knocking the Millefiore members unconscious one by one. The place he lured them to is revealed to be meant for attacks like this. The Vongola find out that one of the shopping malls ducts lead to the Millefiore base. They enter the ducts only to trigger a trap where lasers prepare to fire on them.
103	2	"The First Barrier"; Transliteration: "Dai'ichi Kanmon" (Japanese: 第一関門)	October 11, 2008
Tsuna and the others escape the ducts by breaking it open and falling to the ground below. There they face Dendro Chilum. Tsuna defeats him with the X Burner and they continue in the Millefiore base undetected.
104	3	"Magician of Fate"; Transliteration: "In'nen no Majishan" (Japanese: 因縁の魔導師(マジシャン))	October 18, 2008
They continue on and encounter GingerBread, a young boy who asks them whether they are after him for revenge for their friend, Colonnello. Lal Mirch battles GingerBread but is severely injured in the process.
105	4	"Regret"; Transliteration: "Kōkai" (Japanese: 後悔)	October 25, 2008
GingerBread reveals that Colonnello died by saving Viper who then killed himself out of hopelessness. Lal Mirch remembers back to the past before she becomes an incomplete Acrobaleno because Colonnello took her place. She had a blue incomplete pacifier which she promised not to use so she would become human again. In the present time, Lal Mirch uses her pacifier and defeats GingerBread. It was revealed GingerBread was a doll and explodes, injuring Lal Mirch. Just then the alarm goes off informing Millefiore of their presence.
106	5	"The Student's Maturation"; Transliteration: "Oshiego-tachi no Seichō" (Japanese: 教え子たちの成長)	November 1, 2008
To avoid being trapped by Millefiore, Lal Mirch volunteers to distract them. Tsuna volunteers in her place since he is the most mobile with his X-Gloves. The team make their way deeper into the base while Tsuna battles Moscas. He is overpowered and gets dragged underwater.
107	6	"Absolute Desperation"; Transliteration: "Zettai Zetsumei" (Japanese: 絶体絶命)	November 8, 2008
Tsuna escapes from the grasp of the Moscas and continues his battle. He defeats them the minions but the man named Spanner who pilots the King Mosca remains. Tsuna prepares to give up the fight but Reborn tells him he should use the X Burner in the air. Tsuna defeats the King Mosca but loses consciousness in the process. Spanner leaves the Mosca and prepares to kill Tsuna.
108	7	"A Man's Box Weapon"; Transliteration: "Otoko no Bokkusu Heiki" (Japanese: 漢(おとこ)の匣(ボックス)兵器)	November 15, 2008
Tsuna's family become worried at the amount Tsuna is gone while they continue searching the base. While crawling through an air duct, they run into Baishana and Nigella fighting. Nigella is then beaten by Baishana box weapon, a snake covered in storm flames. Ryohei decides to fight in place of Yamamto and Gokudera and summons his box weapon Kangayuu, a Kangaroo. Back at Tsuna's scene of the battle, Tsuna and Spanner are nowhere to be found.
109	8	"Captive"; Transliteration: "Toraware" (Japanese: 囚われ)	November 22, 2008
Tsuna awakens to find himself a captive of Spanner. Spanner tells him he has covered up Tsuna's whereabouts by reporting him as missing to the Millefiore. Meanwhile, Ryohei continues his battle but now in the air as Kangayuu shoots out boots that propel him into the air with the sun flames.
110	9	"The Secret of Merone Base"; Transliteration: "Merōne Kichi no Himitsu" (Japanese: メローネ基地の秘密)	November 29, 2008
Ryohei defeats Baishana and his box weapon with a move called "Maximum Ingram". Back at the Vongola hideout, Haru is worried about Tsuna and Kyoko is worried about her brother. Ryohei, Gokudera, and Yamamoto continue their way into the base but suddenly the base starts to move.
111	10	"The Enemy is Octopus Head"; Transliteration: "Teki wa Tako Heddo" (Japanese: 敵はタコヘッド)	December 6, 2008
The base is moved by Irie Shouichi and Ryohei and Gokudera are separated from Yamamoto and Lal Mirch. Ryohei and Gokudera then run into a white spell Millefiore member who uses his box animal of a slime monster to attack them. Gokudera is trapped inside but is then freed by Uri. He then destroys the box animal. Meanwhile Yamamoto with Lal Mirch wanders into a room and is surprised by what he sees.
112	11	"Boomerang Trap"; Transliteration: "Būmeran no Wana" (Japanese: ブーメランの罠)	December 13, 2008
Yamamoto ends up in a room full of pipes. There he meets a white-spell Millefiore member who uses a boomerang with the storm flame to attack him. Yamamoto realizes that he could not predict where the attacks are coming from because he is actually fighting twins. Yamamoto defeats them. Irie Shouichi moves the base again and Gokudera and Ryohei run into Gamma.
113	12	"Lightning Strikes Again"; Transliteration: "Denkō, Sairai" (Japanese: 電光、再来)	December 20, 2008
Ryohei ties up Gokudera with a box weapon to make the battle fair against Gamma. Tsuna meanwhile attempts to escape from Spanner but Reborn who is able to get in contact with him after the base moves closer to the surface, tells him he needs to master the X-Burner or he can not defeat Millefiore. Ryohei is severely injured by Gamma. Hibari continues his way in the subway, surrounded by Milliefiore members once again.
114	13	"The Storm Guardian, Stands"; Transliteration: "Arashi no Shugosha, Tatsu" (Japanese: 嵐の守護者, 立つ)	December 27, 2008
Ryohei manages to heal himself and continues his battle with Gamma. He is however defeated by Gamma's Electric Tower technique. Gokudera is free from the ropes and reveals his Sistema C.A.I.
115	14	"SISTEMA C.A.I."; Transliteration: "Sisutēma C.A.I." (Japanese: スィステーマC.A.I.)	January 10, 2009
Gokudera talks about his Sistema C.A.I. and explains how he discovered its use. Hibari continues his way into the subway and uses his box weapon to trap the Millefiore members on the other side. Spanner explains to Tsuna that he will create contact lenses so Tsuna would be able to measure his flame power on his gloves and help him balance his X-burner.
116	15	"Difference in Resolve"; Transliteration: "Kakugo no Sa" (Japanese: 覚悟の差)	January 17, 2009
Gamma manages to open a box to unleash his box animal powers, turning his foxes black in color. Gokudera is defeated, but Gokudera's box animal Uri comes out of Kangayuu's pouch charged with Sun flames as a lepord to defend him.
117	16	"Storm Fights Back"; Transliteration: "Arashi no Gyakushū" (Japanese: 嵐の逆襲)	January 24, 2009
It is revealed the Sun flames from Ryohei's box animal was used by Uri to transform. Uri manages to hold back Gamma's box animals while Gokudera deals with Gamma. Meanwhile, Gamma remembers when his family was separate from the Millefiore. In his memory, the boss just died, and her daughter Yuni is the heir.
118	17	"The Princess's Conviction"; Transliteration: "Hime no Ketsui" (Japanese: 姫の決意)	January 31, 2009
In Gamma's memory, after a failed bargaining with the Millefiore Family, Genkishi returns with injuries to the Giglio Nero family. Yuni decides to meet with Byakuran to prevent any more of her subordinates being hurt. After meeting with him privately, Yuni returns emotionless and a loyal servant to Byakuran. Gamma mentions how Genkishi was the biggest traitor to the Giglio Nero Family and how he wants to defeat Byakuran.
119	18	"Interval Between Battles"; Transliteration: "Tatakai no Hazama" (Japanese: 戦いの狭間)	February 7, 2009
Lal Mirch recaps what has happened during their invasion of the Milliefiore base up to the point of Gokudera's and Gamma's battle.
120	19	"Virtual Space"; Transliteration: "Kasō Kūkan" (Japanese: 仮想空間)	February 14, 2009
Tsuna needs to be placed in battle so the contacts can be adjusted for the X-burner. Tsuna puts on gears that puts him in a virtual space to fight Moscas; he could die if he dies in that space. Later, Irie Shouichi moves the base again and places a virus in the virtual space and Tsuna must defeat it.
121	20	"Two Battles"; Transliteration: "Futatsu no Tatakai" (Japanese: ふたつの戦い)	February 21, 2009
Yamamoto runs into the same black spell member Nosaru. Meanwhile, Tsuna after a long battle defeats the mysterious Ultimate Cube. Yamamoto in his battle manages to push back his enemy and the base is moved again.
122	21	"The Ultimate Swordsman"; Transliteration: "Saikyō no Kenshi" (Japanese: 最強の剣士)	February 28, 2009
Tsuna's contacts are completed and Tsuna waits for the contacts to adjust. Iris and Gingerbread investigate Spanner and suspect him of harboring Tsuna. Yamamoto ends up in a room of water and faces the strongest soldier of the Millefiore, Genkishi. Genkishi reveals that he faked his defeat against Squalo for the purpose of Milliefiore. Back at the Vongola base, Kyoko and Haru are trying to find the missing Chrome, Lambo, and I-pin.
123	22	"Teachings of the Sword Emperor"; Transliteration: "Kentei no Oshie" (Japanese: 剣帝の教え)	March 7, 2009
Yamamoto and Genkishi continue to battle, until Yamamoto's sword appears cracked. He then remembers in the video Squalo sent him of Genkishi, that he mentioned mist illusions have gotten to the point it can trick everyone in the surrounding area and even cameras. Meanwhile, Gingerbread and Iris continue searching for Spanner. Yamamoto realizes that Genkishi created the illusion of his sword being cracked and continues their battle.
124	23	"Obstructing Mist"; Transliteration: "Tachi Hadakaru Kiri" (Japanese: 立ちはだかる霧)	March 14, 2009
Chrome was revealed to have impersonated a person in the base. Yamamoto is defeated by Genkishi who reveals the room they were fighting in had steel walls covered by the mist causing Yamamoto to run into one of them. Gokudera and Gamma unleash their final attack.
125	24	"More Intruders"; Transliteration: "Saranaru Shinyūsha" (Japanese: さらなる侵入者)	March 21, 2009
Gokudera and Gamma finish the battle destroying the battlefield. Meanwhile, Reborn and Tsuna figure out that the circle machine was created by Irie Shouichi for time travel causing them all to be stuck in the future. Iris arrives finding Spanner's hiding place. Genkishi about to deal the final blow to the unconscienced Yamamoto, but is intervened by the arrival of Hibari.
126	25	"The Strongest versus The Strongest"; Transliteration: "Saikyō VS Saikyō" (Japanese: 最強VS最強)	March 28, 2009
Hibari and Genkishi match each other blow for blow. Meanwhile, Iris gives her death squad a power boost. Another squad team is sent to defeat Chrome, but her illusions of Yamamoto, Gokudera and Ryohei defeat the squad. Hibari is about to use his last 3 rings.
127	26	"A Bewitching Flower"; Transliteration: "Ayakashi no Hana" (Japanese: 妖かしの花)	April 4, 2009
Hibari use his last 3 rings for Reverse Neddle Sphere. Iris's death squad attacks Tsuna and Tsuna fights back which defeated 2 of 4 of Iris's death squad. Hibari from the past comes to the future.
128	27	"The Head Prefect Comes"; Transliteration: "Fūki Iinchō, Kuru" (Japanese: 風紀委員長, 来る)	April 11, 2009
Genkishi finds the Hibari from ten years past in Hibari's place. Meanwhile, Tsuna is still fighting the Deathstalk squad and is having difficulty due to Iris propagating her squad. Gingerbread also, arrives to aid Iris against Tsuna.
129	28	"Operation X"; Transliteration: "Operēshin Ikusu" (Japanese: オペレーションX(イクス))	April 18, 2009
Chrome finds Gokudera in the ruins of the battlefield. Meanwhile, Tsuna continues his battle with Iris and Gingerbread. Spanner completes the contact lenses which then allows Tsuna to use a full powered X-Burner aimed at Gingerbread and Iris.
130	29	"Resolve and Irritation"; Transliteration: "Kakugo to Mukatsuki" (Japanese: 覚悟とムカツキ)	April 25, 2009
Tsuna defeats Iris and Gingerbread with his X-Burner while destroying three rooms in the process. Meanwhile, Genkishi was about to kill Hibari when the others manage to arrive to Hibari's location and save him. Hibari mentions he's learned how to use the ring from Dino in the past and ignites it. He then uses the flame to release his hedgehog box weapon.
131	30	"Rampage"; Transliteration: "Bōsō" (Japanese: 暴走)	May 2, 2009
When Hibari opens his original hedgehog box weapon, the hedgehog starts to act drunk from the amount of flames from Hibari's Dying Will given to it. After accidentally poking Hibari's hand, the hedgehog becomes mentally shocked and goes out of control. It rapidly starts to grow, endangering all those around it. Meanwhile, Tsuna heads toward the lab with Spanner in tow.
132	31	"Final Block Of Defense"; Transliteration: "Saishū Bōei Burokku" (Japanese: 最終防衛区間(ブロック))	May 9, 2009
Tsuna flies through Merone Base with a mission to find Shoichi Irie and the white, round device in his laboratory. Irie tries to interfere with Tsuna's movements by moving Merone Base's blocks. With Spanner behind him, Tsuna cannot shake off a homing missile by increasing his speed, but he is saved by Spanner's modified chaff and flame shots. Tsuna is later intercepted by the Phantom Knight, Genkishi.
133	32	"A Game-Changing Move"; Transliteration: "Gyakuten e no Itte" (Japanese: 逆転への一手)	May 16, 2009
Genkishi engages Tsuna in a battle using his hell ring, an armour and a special sword. Tsuna is at a disadvantage as he does not have much energy left due to firing the X Burner few times before. However, Genkishi wavers when Tsuna's resolute eyes reminds him of Uni. Tsuna then sets up a plan to absorb Genkishi's flames, and he regains his energy. Tsuna gains the upper hand and manages to overpower Genkishi.
134	33	"Hell Knight"; Transliteration: "Jigoku no Kishi" (Japanese: 地獄の騎士)	May 23, 2009
Genkishi recalls a certain memory of when he had been ordered by Byakuran to annihilate the Giglio Nero Family but was too intimidated by Uni's eyes to do so. Genkishi tries to gain even more power from the ring in order to make up for his blunder and transforms into a skeletal figure, which then shoots out illusions he claims that are linked to the actual guardian souls. However, Tsuna sees through his scheming plots and prepares to fire a full powered X Burner.
135	34	"Arrival"; Transliteration: "Tōtatsu!!" (Japanese: 到達！！)	May 30, 2009
Tsuna unleashes a full powered X-Burner and defeats Genkishi. In the wreckage, Tsuna finds Irie Shouichi's white round machine. Irie appears and reveals he's holding all of Tsuna's friend's hostage in a tank. Irie reveals the white round machine holds the older Tsuna and the others. Irie reveals he sent them to the future in order to obtain the Vongola Rings. He demands Tsuna to hand over his Sky Ring or his friends will be killed. The Cervello counts down the time limit for Tsuna to make his decision.
136	35	"Revealed Truth"; Transliteration: "Akasareru Shinjutsu" (Japanese: 明かされる真実)	June 6, 2009
Shouichi tranquilizes the Cervello before they could kill Tsuna's friends. He reveals he is on the Vongola's side, and that all the events that have occurred was a plan devised by Shouichi along with future Tsuna and future Hibari in order to train their past selves to defeat Byakuran. Shouichi reveals that the next step of the plan will depend on the Millefiore base invasion in Italy, which is led by the Varia.
137	36	"Main Battle in Italy"; Transliteration: "Italia Shuryoku Sen" (Japanese: イタリア主力戦)	June 13, 2009
The Varia split up into three groups, Squalo, Lussuria with Levi, and Bel with the new illusionist member of Varia named Fran. Squalo meanwhile finds out Xanxus is displeased with his meal and sends injured soldiers to him. He meets some Milliefiore members and defeats them with his Shark box weapon named Grande Pioggia. Bel and Fran run into Milliefiore members and Bel easily disposes of them with his box weapon Storm Mink. Just then, Bel's butler from his childhood, Olgelt, reveals that Bel's older twin brother, Sil is alive. Sil then appears on a flying throne.
138	37	"Twin Princes"; Transliteration: "Futago no Ōji" (Japanese: 双子の王子)	June 20, 2009
Sil is revealed to be one of the Six Funeral Wreaths. Bel, Fran, Olgelt, and Sil release their box weapons for battle. Sil's box weapon is revealed to be a Storm Bats with the ability to fire invisible sonar waves enchanted with storm flames; The storm flames when in contact with something causes an explosion. Bel and Fran are defeated. Olgelt sends his Rain Elephant and destroys the castle the Varia invaded. In the remains of the castle, an unharmed Xanxus on his throne is seen drinking wine.
139	38	"Furious Roar"; Transliteration: "Ikari no Hōko" (Japanese: 怒りの咆哮)	June 27, 2009
The corpse of Bel and Fran are revealed to be illusions of Fran, who wanted to see whether Sil or Xanxus is stronger. Olgelt sends his Rain Elephant after Xanxus but they become petrified in mid-flight. Xanxus' Sky Lion box weapon, Besta, is revealed to be the one petrifying the Elephant. Sil attacks Xanxus with his storm bats causing heavy damage to him. Xanxus unmoving from his throne becomes enraged and reveals Besta is actually a Sky-Storm Liger, an offspring from a Sky lion with a Storm tiger.
140	39	"Another Sky"; Transliteration: "Mō Hitotsu no Ōzora" (Japanese: もう一つの大空)	July 4, 2009
Xanxus returns Besta to his box, warning Sil that when he releases Besta, he will be finished. Xanxus demands Sil to call Byakuran. Sil refuses and attacks Xanxus with his Storm Bats. Xanxus releases Besta and defeats Sil. Tsuna and the others receive news that the battle in Italy was successful. At that moment, Ryohei from ten years ago arrives from the past. Shouichi opens up the white capsule containing the ten years later version of Tsuna and his Guardians and gives Tsuna the Vongola Box from his future self.
