= Hidekazu Ichinose =

Japanese voice actor (born 1975)

- 市瀬 秀和
- Born: March 16, 1975 (age 51)
- Website: www.ichiroom.com

Hidekazu Ichinose (市瀬 秀和, Ichinose Hidekazu; born March 16, 1975 in Yamanashi Prefecture, Japan) is a Japanese voice actor. His most notable role was playing Hayato Gokudera in Reborn!.

== Filmography ==
=== Anime ===
List of voice performances in anime
Year	Title	Role	Notes	Source
2005	Eyeshield 21	Taiga Kamiya		
2006	We Were There	Kagawa		
2006	Reborn!	Hayato Gokudera		
2009	ja:夢をかなえるゾウ	Tachibana		
2012	Poyopoyo Kansatsu Nikki	Hide Sato		
2012	Kamisama Kiss	Aotake		
2013	DD Fist of the North Star	Juza		
2015	Kamisama Kiss◎	Aotake		

=== Video games ===
List of voice performances in anime
Year	Title	Role	Notes	Source
2006–10	Reborn!	Hayato Gokudera		

=== Tokusatsu ===
List of performances in tokusatsu
Year	Title	Role	Notes	Source
2001	Ultraman Cosmos	Keisuke Fubuki		
