= Cherryblossom =

Japanese band

- Origin: Nagoya, Japan
- Genres: Rock
- Years active: 2007—2010
- Labels: Pony Canyon
- Members: Meeko, Maico, Kuppa, 83, Yuchi

Cherryblossom is a Japanese rock band from Tokyo, who debuted in 2007. Their initial release was the mini-album Riskygirl, which was followed by three singles and then in 2008 by a full album titled GO!. Cherryblossom are most commonly known for their singles, Dive To World, Cycle, and Sakura Rock, which were part of the soundtrack for the anime Katekyo Hitman Reborn!.

== Band members ==
The band consists of four members:

- Vocalists: Maico and Meeko
- Guitar: Kuppa
- Bass: 83 (stage name)
- Drums: Yucchi

== Discography ==
=== EPs ===
- Riskygirl (2007)
- Hoshizora Triangle (2009)

=== Albums ===
- GO! (2008)
- Jikuu (2011)
- Complete Best Cherryblossom (2011)

=== Singles ===
- Dive To World (2007)
- Harukaze Lover Song (2008)
- Cycle (2008)
- Sakura Rock (2009)
- Yume no Manual (2009)
