= Ryohei Sasagawa =

- Reborn! character
- Ryohei Sasagawa by Akira Amano
- First appearance: Reborn! chapter 14; Reborn! anime episode 1
- Voiced by: Hidenobu Kiuchi

In-universe information
- Relatives: Kyoko Sasagawa (sister)
- Affiliation: Vongola Family

Ryohei Sasagawa (Japanese: 笹川 了平, Hepburn: Sasagawa Ryōhei) is a fictional character in the anime and manga series Reborn! created by Akira Amano. He has also appeared in other media from the Reborn! franchise including video games and light novels. Ryohei is portrayed as one of the series' protagonists, and is introduced as the energetic member of the boxing club at Namimori Middle School. He would often attempt to get the main character, Tsuna Sawada, to join his club, and in response, Tsuna's home tutor, Reborn, attempts to get him to join Tsuna's personal Mafia family. His role is initially minimal, usually only having brief appearances since his introduction. Becoming the Vongola Family's Sun Guardian is what leads to his first significant and recurring involvement in the story.

== Character outline ==
=== Personality ===
Ryohei is the older brother of the Tsuna's love interest, Kyoko. He is a boxing-obsessed student who often prefers to fight his opponents head on and sees any disadvantage as a chance to improve his fighting skills. He is always hiding the truth of what he is doing from Kyoko due to an incident that happened when they were still in primary school: some high school students who did not like Ryohei used Kyoko to lure him into a trap, which resulted in the scar on his left temple. Though Kyoko feels responsible, he was not dissuaded and continued to fight.

Every time he sees Tsuna and his friends doing something strange, he gets fired up and always wants to be a part of it, though appears to be unaware that it is Mafia-related. Due to Ryohei's enthusiasm, he often rushes into things without fully evaluating the situation, which often ends in his humiliation. He can get flustered at times, however, as shown when he sees a picture of his adult self and Hana Kurokawa together in the future. He also has a short memory and forgets many important details, something his adult self solved by writing memo's. He often uses the word "extreme".

=== Abilities ===
Ryohei is an excellent boxer who possesses greater strength than the average human. His boxing training resulted in his proficiency in hand-to-hand combat, and ability to take and give a huge amount of physical punishment. Even the Dying Will Shot, which increases a person's strength by removing the body's limiters, has no effect on him since he always lives "to the extreme." His body's potential strength is exemplified during his training with the Arcobaleno Colonnello, who told him that his naturally strong muscles and his superior cells are at its best after his body is rested, thus Ryohei only uses his left fist in order to keep his right in perfect condition. Colonnello also shoots him with a spiritually condensed bullet to unlock his potential, which enables him to unleash "Maximum Cannon", a blow strong enough to break boulders.

In the future, Ryohei has greatly improved in his abilities, learning Lussuria's footwork techniques to move at great speed, and using it to upgrade his Maximum Cannon into "Maximum Ingram", which deals multiple blows. His Sun Dying Will Flame, which contains "activation" characteristics, can increase the rate of recovery in his own skin cells, and can also be used to overload other box weapons. He also carries a special box that releases a kangaroo named "Kangaryū" (漢我流, lit. 'my way of honor'), but only uses it for support since he relies on his own strength. The kangaroo generates boxing gloves that multiply his healing capabilities, and a pair of boots that grants him the ability to fly. When young Ryohei replaces his older self, he is given the Sun Vongola Box Weapon, The Knuckle of Maximum Break, which hyper activates his nerves and muscles making him much stronger and faster. However, this power is overwhelming on his body so he can only use it for three minutes. When his Vongola Ring is destroyed by the Shimon family, it is replaced with the Vongola Bangle which, in its Cambio Forma mode, removes the three-minute time limit and also converts damage received from enemies into flame energy which can be used in a powerful attack.

== Appearances ==
=== In Reborn! ===
Adult Ryohei as depicted in the future.

In the initial parts of the story, Ryohei plays a small role, randomly appearing only a few times to take part in what are usually Reborn's schemes. When the Kokuyo Gang later appears in Namimori Town, Ryohei is targeted due to his status as Namimori High's fifth strongest student, and loses a fight against Ken Joshima, resulting in his loss of five teeth as well as being temporarily hospitalized.

Ryohei is later entrusted with the Vongola's Ring of the Sun and is trained by Colonnello. Despite facing major disadvantages, he defeats Lussuria in the Vongola Tournament's first match against the Varia. During the final battle, in which the fighters are injected with poison, Hayato Gokudera cures Ryohei, who goes on to cure Lussuria despite their differing allegiance. He later saves Takeshi Yamamoto, Chrome Dokuro, and Gokudera from Mammon's illusions.

In the series' alternate future story arc, after returning from meeting with the Varia in Italy, adult Ryohei finds and delivers the past's Chrome to the Vongola base at Namimori, along with the information he retrieved concerning the Vongola's plan to attack the Millefiore Family. During their siege of the enemy's Japanese base, he encounters and defeats Millefiore member Baishana. After Ryohei and Gokudera get separated from the others due to the base's rooms being rearranged, they encounter Gamma, whom subsequently defeats Ryohei in battle. Ryohei, however, is able to protect Gokudera from Gamma's attack with the last of his strength, and his Kangaryū's abilities helps Gokudera gain the upper-hand against Gamma. When his past self appears, the Vongola Rings are united, protecting the others from being teleported away with the base. After being explained the situation, only to comprehend who is the main bad guy, Ryohei undergoes training on how to use the weapons of that era. In the battle against the Six Funeral Wreaths, Ryohei is wounded while protecting Uni. However, he still takes part in the final battle against the Millfiore later on.

In the Inheritance Arc, he is one of the guardians who go to see Tsuna officially become Vongola the 10th. His Vongola Sun ring is destroyed by the Shimon Family as revenge for Primo's betrayal of their first boss. Afterwards, the Vongola Sun Ring is upgraded to Vongola Gear: Bangle of the Sun, Version X. He accompanies Tsuna, Gokudera and Lambo to Shimon's hideout where he faces Koyo Aoba in a boxing fight where he demonstrates his Bangle's power. The match ends in a tie and both he and Koyo are imprisoned by Vindice. He is later released after Daemon Spade's defeat due to a contract made between Tsuna and the Vindice.

=== In other media ===
Besides his appearances in the original manga series and its anime adaptation, Ryohei has appeared in various other Reborn! works, including several of the series' video games.

He also stars in one of the Hidden Bullet light novels called Extreme Memories, which is set before he met Tsuna. The chapter shows how Ryohei and Hibari first met and why he has never asked Hibari to join the boxing club.

== Reception ==
Ryohei has generally ranked lower than the other main characters in every official Shonen Jump character popularity poll of the series, not even placing in the first two polls. In the third poll of the series, he ranked as the fourteenth most popular male character. In the fourth poll, he only ranked as the eighteenth most popular overall character.
