= Kyoya Hibari =

- Reborn! character
- Kyoya Hibari as depicted in the manga
- First appearance: Manga chapter 16; Anime episode 1
- Created by: Akira Amano
- Voiced by: Takashi Kondo
- Affiliation: Disciplinary Committee; The Foundation; Vongola Family

Kyoya Hibari (Japanese: 雲雀 恭弥, Hepburn: Hibari Kyōya) is a fictional character in the anime and manga series Reborn! created by Akira Amano. For the most part of the series, Hibari is portrayed as a supporting character, taking little to no interest in the events that surround the protagonist, Tsuna Sawada. He is introduced as the leader of the Disciplinary Committee at Tsuna's school, Namimori Middle. Despite his status, he is a delinquent who uses violence to create his own form of order in school, as well as enforcing it throughout certain parts of the town of Namimori. Apart from the manga and anime, Hibari has also appeared in other media from the Reborn! franchise including video games and novels.

Hibari's character has been well received by readers since his introduction. He has ranked as one of the most popular characters in every official Shonen Jump poll of the series, taking the top spot twice. In an annual survey conducted by Japanese music distributor Recochoku, Hibari has been named the number one anime character that people would like to marry for two consecutive years. Also, his and Mukuro Rokudo's character CD entitled "Sakura addiction" became the most successful Reborn! character CD, peaking at seventh place on the Oricon charts. Their performance earned each of their voice actors a Seiyu Awards' nomination for "Best Musical Performance". Merchandise based on his appearance has also been released including key chains and action figures.

== Character outline ==
=== Personality ===
Head of the Middle School's Discipline Committee of Prefects, who are actually all delinquents, Hibari is known for using his status to enforce his own order throughout all of Namimori Town. Despite the students' and other residents' fear of him, they respect and rely on him since his presence acts as a deterrent to other forms of trouble. Having great pride in his school, even using its anthem as his ringtone, Hibari is especially protective of it and dislikes it when the "peace" in Namimori is disrupted. The only thing greater than his school pride is his own self pride, opting to ignore the damage inflicted on the school building just for a chance to fight Mukuro Rokudo, whom defeated him before, once more. He dislikes crowds, preferring to be alone, and often says "I'll bite you to death" (kamikorosu) to anyone in his way. He is very confident in his abilities but since he cares little about the events surrounding the other characters, he only involves himself when there is a worthy opponent to fight. Though he has a preference for strong opponents, taking a special interest in the Arcobaleno baby, Reborn, he has no qualms in beating down those he deem weak, whom he calls "herbivores". These traits make him an optimal candidate for the Vongola's Cloud Guardian, who is the one who protects the family from outside opposition while remaining a standalone force. Despite his cold and violent exterior, he actually has soft spot for small animals such as Hibird and Roll, and small children such as I-Pin. His future self embodies this as he is stated to be the Vongola X's strongest guardian yet his allegiance remains a mystery to his enemies. His present self eventually comes to terms with his role but dislikes it when others associate him with Tsuna's group.

=== Weapons and abilities ===
Throughout the series, Hibari has displayed amazing feats of speed, reflexes, and strength. He is ranked as the strongest Namimori student by the young statistician, Futa, and is also remarked to have an unlimited potential for growth by the Chiavarone's Mafia boss, Dino. His primary weapons are a pair of collapsible steel tonfas which have several hidden compartments containing chains and different types of spikes. After becoming a Vongola Guardian, he acquires the "Vongola Cloud Ring", a special high level ring that helps in manifesting his cloud wave energy into purple flames which possess propagation characteristics. Hibari possesses strong amounts of wave energy, so much so that when his future self uses normal rings, they shatter shortly after. Future Hibari has also acquired special boxes which release flame covered tonfas or hedgehogs when activated by his rings. Using his flame's characteristics, the hedgehogs can multiply, expand its spikes, or grow into a huge spiked sphere that can either damage everything it touches or encase people within an airtight space.

When Hibari uses his Vongola Ring with his Vongola Box, it releases a hedgehog he later names "Roll". When in its Cambio Forma state, Roll transforms into the "Alaude Handcuffs". Hibari is able to trap his opponents by multiplying the amount and size of the handcuffs until they become physical restraints. The handcuffs and chains can then tighten until his opponent is squeezed to death. After his Vongola Ring is shattered, he acquires its upgraded form, the Vongola Gear's "Bracelet of the Clouds". When he uses the bracelet to summon Roll and activates its Cambio Forma state, Hibari's uniform and tonfas are altered. It also makes it possible for him to still materialize the Alaude Handcuffs as well.

== Plot overview ==
Adult Hibari as depicted in the future

After his introduction, he rarely appears, and his few appearances usually end violently. During an encounter with Dr. Shamal, however, he gets infected with the Sakura-kura disease, which makes him weak around cherry blossoms. When he later faces Mukuro Rokudo, the latter quickly defeats him by using his weakness to cherry blossoms. Soon after, he receives the cure and fights Mukuro again, dealing a critical blow before collapsing due to his previous injuries. Iemitsu Sawada later chooses Hibari to be the holder of the Vongola's Cloud Ring. After training with Dino, Hibari appears during the Vongola Tournament and swiftly defeats the Varia's Gola Moska. He then challenges Xanxus, but is interrupted by a malfunctioning Moska. During the group battle, Hibari cures himself of a paralyzing poison injected into him and briefly fights Belphegor. Hibari becomes the Vongola's Cloud Guardian after Tsuna's side reigns victorious.

In the story's alternate future (nearly ten years later), after future Hibari defeats the Millefiore member Gamma, he trains the past's Tsuna. He also explains to Tsuna's group about the special boxes, which Hibari had been researching, having even started an organization called "The Foundation". After acting as a decoy when the Millefiore raids their base, Hibari infiltrates the enemy's Melone Base. He engages Genkishi in battle, but is replaced by his younger self in the midst of it. Though the past's Hibari is able to open a box weapon that releases a hedgehog, it goes berserk after injuring Hibari and expands its spikes at great speed, separating his group from Genkishi. After reuniting and returning to Namimori, Hibari encounters future Dino, who teaches him how to control his box weapon. He returns to join the others in the battle against the Six Funeral Wreaths, where he manages to defeat Daisy using his Vongola Box.

After returning to his own time, the arrival of the Shimon Family at Namimori results in him briefly clashing with one of its members, Adelheid Suzuki, who desired the disbandment of Hibari's Disciplinary Committee. When he attends Tsuna's Inheritance Ceremony, he is defeated by the Shimon's leader, Enma. Since his Cloud Ring is shattered in the fight, he acquires its upgraded form, the Vongola Gear's Bracelet of the Cloud Version X. When he arrives on the Simon Island, he proceeds to defeat Adelheid in battle and helped Tsuna in realizing what his pride is. During the battle against Demon Spade, Hibari engaged him alone, but then got sent into the illusionary world and trapped there for the rest of the duration of the battle.

Weeks after Demon's defeat, Hibari was invited by Reborn to join his team in the Representative Battle of the Rainbow, but Hibari refused because he had enough grouping from the previous battle at Simon Island. Instead, he accepted Fon's request to fight as his representative because Fon only ask Hibari alone without any other members as his representatives and he wishes to fight the other teams. During the second day of the battle, Hibari fights against Varia together with Fon, disqualifying Levi A Than, Lussuria, Belphegor, and Squalo. He survived Xanxus' attack until it reached the time limit, but Hibari was so dissatisfied with the unfinished fight that he destroyed his own boss watch so he can continue to fight outside the Representative Battle of the Rainbow. He later rejoined the fight against Team Bermuda in the last of the battle, fighting together with Mukuro against Jager after the other members were defeated. He and Mukuro defended Tsuna from Jager's attack, giving Tsuna the opportunity to defeat Jager.

== Appearances in other media ==
Besides his appearance in the original manga series and its anime adaptation, Hibari has appeared in other Reborn! works, including all of the series' video games. In some games, his future self appears as a playable character. He also stars in one of the Hidden Bullet light novels called Extreme Memories, which is set before the start of the series. On November 7, 2007, Pony Canyon released a character CD entitled "Sakura addiction", which features the characters of Hibari and Mukuro. It contains duets and individual songs sung by both of their voice actors: Takashi Kondō and Toshinobu Iida. The song "Sakura addiction", which was sung by both voice actors, is used as the fifth ending theme for the anime series.

== Reception ==
Several pieces of merchandising based on Hibari's appearance have been released. These include key chains, action figures and cosplays. Hibari and Mukuro's character CD, "Sakura addiction", became the most successful Reborn! character CD, debuting in ninth place in the Oricon charts. The single reached its peak at seventh place, but remained in the chart's Top 40 till mid-January 2008. The second annual Seiyu Awards nominated both Takashi Kondo and Toshinobu Iida for "Best Musical Performance", but they did not win it. Hibari has been highly popular with the Reborn! reader base, ranking as the fourth most popular character with a total of 1769 votes in the official Shonen Jump poll of the series. In the second poll which was divided between heroes and villains, Hibari ranked as the second most popular hero losing to Tsuna Sawada. In the third poll of the series, Hibari ranked as the most popular male character, while in the fourth he ranked second, losing to Tsuna. In the fifth poll, he ranked as the second most popular overall character, while in the sixth, he ranks number one once again. As of 2008, the Japanese music distributor Recochoku had made two annual surveys of which anime characters people would like to marry. In both years, Hibari ranked number one in the category "The Character I Want to Be My Groom." In the Animedia character popularity poll, Hibari has been featured as from the 2nd and 4th most popular anime character as well as the 2nd highest male character.

Manga News noted that despite Hibari's introduced as an anti-hero, he is shown as a strong character who might become one of Tsuna's strongest allies thanks to this skills in combat. In another review, while liking the character, Manga News did not appreciate how Hibari and other supporting characters appeared in gag chapters. Although Sam Kusek from popcultureshock.com liked Hibari's fighting scenes in volume 9 from the series, he mentioned that the "real winners" were Tsuna and Mukuro Rokudo. While reviewing the Reborn! gashapon, Anime News Network's Rob Bricken commented he was confused why Hibari's figure is dressed as a policeman despite praising how it is done. In a review of a following arc, Manga News referred to Hibari as one of the most charismatic characters within the manga which generated positive response when he appeared to join the Vongola in the fight against the Varia. His next fight against Varia's Gola Mosca generated surprise to the reviewer due to how short it is due to Hibari defeating Mosca in only two pages which also shows a big impact in the characters.
