= Hayato Gokudera =

Fictional character from Reborn!

- Reborn! character
- Hayato Gokudera by Akira Amano
- First appearance: Manga chapter 2 Anime episode 1
- Voiced by: Hidekazu Ichinose (Japanese)

In-universe information
- Relatives: Bianchi (half-sister)
- Nationality: Japanese-Italian
- Affiliation: Vongola Family

Hayato Gokudera (Japanese: 獄寺 隼人, Hepburn: Gokudera Hayato) is a fictional character in the anime and manga series Reborn! created by Akira Amano. Portrayed as one of the protagonist's first friends, Hayato Gokudera is introduced as a 14-year-old bad boy born in Italy. He inherits many traits from his mother and is half-Italian and half-Japanese. After the protagonist Tsuna Sawada prevents him from dying due to his own explosives, he joins Tsuna's Vongola Mafia family. He later becomes the Vongola Storm Guardian.

== Character outline ==
=== History ===
The story reveals that when he was younger, he was a talented pianist. However, he soon decided to join the Mafia after his mother's death. His father is also reportedly a member of a Mafia family. Unfortunately, no one wanted to accept him into their family; the fact that he was an oriental half-breed lessened his chances of finding a Mafia family to take him in. To become stronger, he sought advice from Dr. Shamal, who, at the time, was working for his family. Gokudera seemed to have looked up to Shamal who taught him how to use dynamite.

He and Bianchi are written as half-siblings by their father. Gokudera's mother was a woman with whom his father had an affair. She was a very talented pianist, whom their father fell in love with at first sight. Not long after, they became involved and the woman bore a child. However, in the mafia, illegitimate children are not tolerated, and everyone was told that Gokudera was also from Bianchi's mother. His real mother was killed after driving off a cliff on her way to see her son. It slid off the road at an impossible location. Suicide was considered, but she had been looking forward to that day and had even brought a present for the young Gokudera. Gokudera himself was unaware of what had happened until he was eight and fled the mansion the day following the revelation. However, it was then said that the reason Gokudera's mother slid off the cliff at an impossible place was that the accident had been deliberately caused by one of Gokudera's father's organization members. In Chapter 282 or episode 89, however, it turned out that Gokudera's mother was already sick with a disease and it was she that turned down Gokudera's father's proposal because she knew she was going to die soon. According to Bianchi, Gokudera's mother had already died before slipping off from the cliff.

Gokudera did not decide to join the Mafia until after he found out about his mother's death, as he wanted revenge on his father because of this. He wandered about, with no family wanting him until the Vongola finally agreed to let him join. He worked as a hitman for Vongola for several years, which is where he gained his title of Hurricane Bomb Hayato.

=== Personality ===
As a musical and intelligent character Gokudera knows how to play the piano and has an obsession with cryptozoology. At school, Gokudera is adored by many of the female classmates who view him as the "rebellious, cool bad boy." However, despite his image of a rebel, Gokudera excels in his schoolwork and aces all his tests.

As part of the character's personal background it is revealed that Gokudera had a traumatic childhood experience, and that every time he sees the face of his older sister in the, Bianchi, he collapses, sometimes even falling unconscious. He is however immune to his sister when she happens to be wearing something that covers part of her face (mainly the eyes). He has problems showing his feelings to people other than Tsuna because Tsuna was the one who opened his heart.

=== Abilities ===
In the story Gokudera is a dynamite specialist who uses it to either threaten or battle opponents. He was revealed to be able to conceal dynamite on his body. Originally, Gokudera's main weakness was that it was difficult to pinpoint and calculate the exact distance between himself and his target and sync it with the amount of time it would take for the bombs to actually explode. Gokudera learned from Dr. Shamal, to use a type of Rocket Bombs. Each one, once thrown, causes the backside of the bombs to fire up and rocket towards his opponent like high-speed missiles, which then explode on impact.

In the future arc of the manga, the future Gokudera created Sistema Cambio Arma Istantaneo (lit. System Change Arms Instantaneous; Italian for Instantaneous Arms Rearrangement System), commonly called Sistema C.A.I., a system of box weapons that utilize the five different Dying Will Flames that flow within his body. Each attribute of flame has a different effect when used with the storm-attribute rockets fired with the C.A.I.; the storm attribute attacks cause the object or person to degenerate, the rain attribute slows and weakens enemy attacks or dying will flame, it can even go through a solid shield of lightning attribute flames, the lightning attribute creates a solid laser beam, which is his most powerful attack with Sistema C.A.I., Gokudera calls it Flame Thunder, the cloud attribute creates a branching effect, the cloud flame's special ability is propagation, and the sun attribute gives his projectiles an unpredictable acceleration. His box weapons contain a number of miscellaneous accessories used in battle; one creates a lightning disc to ride atop in battle, while two others create shields to defend against enemy attacks. He also possesses a box containing a wild cat which he named Uri. While in his natural form Uri is useless and shows no respect for Gokudera, often scratching and biting him, with Sun Flames, Uri can transform into a massive leopard. Uri is later given an upgrade and now can transform into the Storm Vongola Box, G. Archery, a weapon similar to a crossbow attached to Gokudera's arm that lets him store up his energy to release in powerful flame shots.

== Appearances ==
=== In Reborn! ===
During the Kokuyo Arc, he ranked 3rd as Namimori Junior High's strongest. During his confrontation with Chikusa, he is nearly killed, but manages to survive, after treatment from the lecherous Dr.Shamal. Although he does not fully recover, he joins Tsuna and his friends in looking for the Kokuyo Gang. Gokudera later frees Hibari and gives him the cure to the Sakura-kura virus.

In the Varia arc, Hayato was trained by Shamal. Hayato was later pitted against Belphegor for the Ring of Storm. A struggle for the rings ensued, like area, they were in had large explosives timed to go off shortly. Hayato wanted to please Tsuna and become his right-hand man. But suddenly Tsuna had an outburst saying that they were fighting to have fun with each other. Because Hayato abandoned the rings, Belphegor was deemed the winner. Later, during the Sky match, Hayato was saved by Hibari and after defeating Levi-a-than, proceeded to save Lambo and Ryohei.

After Hayato was transported to the future, he decoded a note left by his future self written in Gokudera - Drawings, his own secret code. To return to the past Tsuna must gather the guardians and defeat Byakuran and Irie Shouichi. He later engages in a fight with a Black spell member, Gamma. He soon came to realize that he was no match for Gamma and, as he was about to receive the finishing blow, was saved by Hibari. After recovering, Gokudera begins his training with his sister. At first, he refused, however, Bianchi offered him something that belonged to their father if he completed his training. He later escapes from her training and is not heard of again for some time. During that time, Gokudera is in the base's library, trying to figure out how Sistema C.A.I. works. When Tsuna searches for him after training he emerges with a new technique. Gokudera is involved in the raid on the Millefiore's Melone base. After being separated from Yamamoto and Lal Mirch, he and Ryohei found themselves face to face with Gamma. After Ryohei is injured fighting Gamma, Gokudera battles Gamma and the two battle to a stalemate. He was later saved and carried off by Kusakabe. After the Melone Base arc, Gokudera is instructed by Dino to teach the ten years younger Ryohei and Lambo how to use their Vongola box weapons. He then participates in the Choice battle, which the Vongola lose, before the group are tasked with protecting Uni, the granddaughter of the Sky Arcobaleno, from Byakuran. Gokudera gets injured, but joins Lal and Gamma in a battle against the Funeral Wreath, Zakuro, and uses his Vongola Box against him.

In the Inheritance Arc, he is one of the guardians who accompanied Tsuna to inherit the title as Vongola 10th. Later, his Vongola Storm Ring was destroyed when the Shimon Family, friends of Vongola who wanted revenge, attacked at the inheritance ceremony. He later gains the Vongola Gear 'Belt of the Storm'.

=== In other media ===
Besides his appearances in the manga and the anime, Gokudera has a character CD along with Takeshi Yamamoto entitled "Our Joy!" (俺達のJOY!, Oretachi no Joy!). It was released by Pony Canyon on January 23, 2008, and it contains various dialogues and phrases by Gokudera and Yamamoto's voice actors, Hidekazu Ichinose and Suguru Inoue, respectively. He has also been featured as a playable character in various video games based on the Reborn! series.

== Reception ==
Various pieces of merchandise have been developed based on Gokudera's appearance such as keychains, plush and figurines. His character has continuously appeared in the Top 5 of the official Shonen Jump popularity polls. In the first poll, he ranked at the top with a total of 3926 votes. In the second poll which was divided between heroes and villains, Gokudera ranked as the third most popular hero losing to Tsuna Sawada and Kyoya Hibari. In the third poll of the series, he ranked as the fourth most popular male character, while in the latest he ranked third, once again losing to Tsuna and Hibari. In the fourth poll Gokudera's future self also appeared sixth in the division in which voted which characters' future selves they wanted to see. While reviewing the ninth volume from the manga series, Sam Kusek from popcultureshock.com liked Gokudera's fights in such volume, but he mentioned that the "real winners" were Tsuna and Mukuro Rokudo. In mangalife.com Michael Aronson's review of the second volume, Gokudera was noted as one of the several "oddball characters" appearing in the series. Manga-sanctuary saw his rivalry with Yamamoto as repetitious.
