= List of Reborn! episodes =

Cover of Reborn!'s first DVD volume released by Marvelous Entertainment.

Reborn!, also known as Katekyō Hitman Reborn!, is an anime television series directed by Kenichi Imaizumi and produced and animated by Artland. It first began airing on TV Tokyo in Japan on October 7, 2006, and has since broadcast over 200 episodes, which are each referred to as a "Target". The anime series is an adaptation of Akira Amano's manga series of the same name, which was first serialized in Japan's Weekly Shōnen Jump in 2004. The series centers around the life of Tsunayoshi "Tsuna" Sawada, a timid boy who learns he is the great-great-great grandson of the founder of the Italian Vongola Mafia family. Tsuna, who is the only living heir, must learn to become a proper Mafia boss and is required to undergo training from the Vongola's number one hitman, an infant named Reborn.

As of June 26, 2009, a total of twenty-eight DVD volumes have been released in Japan by Marvelous Entertainment, with another four scheduled to have consecutive monthly releases. The DVDs have secondary volume titles: the first eight volumes are "Bullets" which contains the first thirty-three episodes; the next eight are "Battles", and contains episodes 34 to 65; volumes seventeen and eighteen are "Daily Chapters", containing episodes 66 to 73; volumes nineteen to twenty-five are "Burn" volumes, and contains episodes 75 to 101; and twenty-sixth onwards are referred to as "X.Burn" volumes.

In 2008, Funimation, on behalf of Japan's d-rights production company, exercised a power of attorney to remove fansubbed episodes of the Reborn! anime from the internet. Thus, to prevent copyright infringement, cease and desist notices were sent to fansub groups who were subtitling the series. On March 21, 2009, d-rights collaborated with the anime-streaming website Crunchyroll in order to begin streaming subbed episodes of the Japanese-dubbed series in North America. New episodes were available within an hour after the airing in Japan.

On April 19, 2017, the first Blu-ray box set released with episodes 1 to 73 including 2 CDs. The second box set includes episodes 74 to 141 along with 1 CD, and the third box set includes episodes 142 to 203 and 2 CDs. The Blu-ray box sets were released celebrating the series' 10th anniversary.

Remow licensed the series in English and started streaming it on its It's Anime YouTube channel in May 2025. Muse Communication licensed the series in Southeast Asia and streamed it on its Muse Asia YouTube channel.

== Series overview ==
Season	Episodes	Originally released	
Season	Episodes	First released	Last released
1	33	October 7, 2006	May 26, 2007
2	32	June 2, 2007	January 12, 2008
3	8	January 19, 2008	March 8, 2008
4	28	March 15, 2008	September 27, 2008
5	39	October 4, 2008	July 4, 2009
6	13	July 11, 2009	October 3, 2009
7	24	October 10, 2009	March 27, 2010
8	12	April 3, 2010	June 19, 2010
9	14	June 26, 2010	September 25, 2010

== Episodes ==
=== Season 1: Bullet (2006–07) ===
No. overall	No. in season	Title	Original release date
1	1	"What!? I'm a Tenth Generation Mafia Boss?!"; Transliteration: "Ē!? Ore ga Mafia no 10 daime!?" (Japanese: えぇ！？俺がマフィアの10代目！？)	October 7, 2006
2	2	"The End of the School?!"; Transliteration: "Ji Endo obu Gakkō!?" (Japanese: ジ・エンド・オブ学校！？)	October 14, 2006
3	3	"Electric Shock! Cooking of Love and Fear!"; Transliteration: "Dengeki! Ai to Kyōfu no Kukkingu!" (Japanese: 電撃！愛と恐怖のクッキング！)	October 21, 2006
4	4	"Ayee! A Girl's Feelings are Destructive!"; Transliteration: "Hahi! Otomegokoro wa Desutoroi!" (Japanese: はひ！乙女心はデストロイ！)	October 28, 2006
5	5	"The Head Prefect's Amusement"; Transliteration: "Fūki Iinchō no Taikutsu Shinogi" (Japanese: 風紀委員長の退屈しのぎ)	November 4, 2006
6	6	"Ni-Hao Gyoza Fist!"; Transliteration: "Nī Hao! Gyōza Ken!" (Japanese: ニーハオ！ギョーザ拳！)	November 11, 2006
7	7	"Extreme! A Fiery Older Brother!"; Transliteration: "Kyokugen! Moeru Oniichan!" (Japanese: 極限！燃えるお兄ちゃん！)	November 18, 2006
8	8	"The Experienced Boss Had Love For His Family!"; Transliteration: "Senpai Bosu wa Famirī Omoi" (Japanese: 先輩ボスはファミリー思い)	November 25, 2006
9	9	"Life-Shortening Skullitis"; Transliteration: "Inochi Mijikashi Dokuro-byō" (Japanese: 命短し ドクロ病)	December 2, 2006
10	10	"Gahaha! The Exploding Lunchbox!"; Transliteration: "Gahaha! Bakuhatsu suru Bentōbako!" (Japanese: ガハハ！爆発する弁当箱！)	December 9, 2006
11	11	"The Gyoza Buns of Love and Death!?"; Transliteration: "Ai to Shi no Gyōza-man!?" (Japanese: 愛と死の餃子まん！？)	December 16, 2006
12	12	"Master's Teacher! Strengthening Program"; Transliteration: "Shi no Kunren! Kyōka Puroguramu" (Japanese: 師の訓練！強化プログラム)	December 23, 2006
13	13	"New Spring! The Hundred Million Yen Contest!"; Transliteration: "Shinshun! Ichiōku-en no Daishōbu!" (Japanese: 新春！一億円の大勝負！)	January 6, 2007
14	14	"First Date!? Hell's Zoo"; Transliteration: "Hatsu Dēto!? Jigoku no Dōbutsuen" (Japanese: 初デート！？地獄の動物園)	January 13, 2007
15	15	"Clash! Survival Snow Battle"; Transliteration: "Sabaibaru Yukigassen" (Japanese: サバイバル雪合戦)	January 20, 2007
16	16	"Escape From Death Mountain!"; Transliteration: "Shi no Yama o Dasshutsu seyo!" (Japanese: 死の山を脱出せよ！)	January 27, 2007
17	17	"Don't Make a Noise When You're Hospitalized"; Transliteration: "Nyūin Saki de wa Oto o Kese" (Japanese: 入院先では音を消せ)	February 3, 2007
18	18	"Poisoned Love Chocolates"; Transliteration: "Ai no Choko ni wa Doku ga Aru" (Japanese: 愛のチョコには毒がある)	February 10, 2007
19	19	"100% Accuracy? Ranking Anything"; Transliteration: "Hyappatsu Hyakuchū? Nandemo Rankingu!" (Japanese: 百発百中？何でもランキング)	February 17, 2007
20	20	"Sudden Attack"; Transliteration: "Totsuzen no Shūgeki" (Japanese: 突然の襲撃)	February 24, 2007
21	21	"Wounded Friends"; Transliteration: "Kizutsuku Tomo-tachi" (Japanese: 傷つく友たち)	March 3, 2007
22	22	"Unforeseen Evil Influence"; Transliteration: "Yokisenu Mashu" (Japanese: 予期せぬ魔手)	March 10, 2007
23	23	"The Final Deathperation Shot"; Transliteration: "Saigo no Shinuki-dan" (Japanese: 最後の死ぬ気弾)	March 17, 2007
24	24	"Fighting Back in Different Ways"; Transliteration: "Sorezore no Hangeki" (Japanese: それぞれの反撃)	March 24, 2007
25	25	"I Want to Win! Moment of Awakening"; Transliteration: "Kachitai! Mezame no Toki" (Japanese: 勝ちたい！目覚めの瞬間(とき))	March 31, 2007
26	26	"The End and From Then On"; Transliteration: "Owari to Sore kara" (Japanese: 終わりとそれから)	April 7, 2007
27	27	"Eat Sushi to Celebrate Moving Up a Grade"; Transliteration: "Shinkyū Iwai de Sushi Kutte" (Japanese: 進級祝いで寿司食って)	April 14, 2007
28	28	"No Way! I Killed Him?"; Transliteration: "Uso! Ore ga Koroshita-no?" (Japanese: ウソ！俺が殺したの？)	April 21, 2007
29	29	"Her Lover is Broccoli?"; Transliteration: "Koibito wa Burokkorī?" (Japanese: 恋人はブロッコリー？)	April 28, 2007
30	30	"Hide and Seek on a Luxury Cruise"; Transliteration: "Gōka Kyakusen de Kakurenbo" (Japanese: 豪華客船でかくれんぼ)	May 5, 2007
31	31	"Welcome to Mafia Land"; Transliteration: "Oidemase Mafia Rando" (Japanese: おいでませマフィア島(ランド))	May 12, 2007
32	32	"A Shark Showed Up in the Public Pool"; Transliteration: "Shimin Pūru ni Same ga Deta" (Japanese: 市民プールに鮫が出た)	May 19, 2007
33	33	"A Summer Filled With Debt?"; Transliteration: "Shakkin Mamire no Natsu-yasumi?" (Japanese: 借金まみれの夏休み？)	May 26, 2007

=== Season 2: Battle (2007–08) ===
No. overall	No. in season	Title	Original release date
34	1	"The Varia Arrive"; Transliteration: "Variā Kuru!" (Japanese: ヴァリアー来る！)	June 2, 2007
35	2	"The Seven Vongola Rings"; Transliteration: "Vongore Ringu Nanatsu" (Japanese: ボンゴレリング7つ)	June 9, 2007
36	3	"Tutors on the Move"; Transliteration: "Katekyō, Ugoku" (Japanese: カテキョー、動く)	June 16, 2007
37	4	"Teacher and Student Together"; Transliteration: "Shitei Konbi, Sorō" (Japanese: 師弟コンビ、揃う)	June 23, 2007
38	5	"The Selfish Baby Cow Vanishes"; Transliteration: "Wagamama Koushi no Shissō" (Japanese: ワガママ子牛の失踪)	June 30, 2007
39	6	"The Unseen Enemies' Goal"; Transliteration: "Miezaru Teki no Mokuteki wa" (Japanese: 見えざる敵の目的は)	July 7, 2007
40	7	"The Battle of the Rings Begins!"; Transliteration: "Ring Sōdatsusen, Kaishi!" (Japanese: リング争奪戦、開始！)	July 14, 2007
41	8	"The Guardian of the Sun Ring's Feelings"; Transliteration: "Hare no Shugosha no Omoi" (Japanese: 晴の守護者の思い)	July 21, 2007
42	9	"The Power to Overcome Adversity"; Transliteration: "Gyakkyō o Hanekaesu Chikara" (Japanese: 逆境をはね返す力)	July 28, 2007
43	10	"Thunder Strike from Twenty Years Later"; Transliteration: "Nijū-nen go no Raigeki" (Japanese: 20年後の雷撃)	August 4, 2007
44	11	"The Stolen Sky Ring"; Transliteration: "Ubawareta Ōzora no Ringu" (Japanese: 奪われた大空のリング)	August 11, 2007
45	12	"Raging Storm Battle"; Transliteration: "Dotō no Arashisen" (Japanese: 怒涛の嵐戦)	August 18, 2007
46	13	"Reason to Fight"; Transliteration: "Tatakau Riyū" (Japanese: 戦う理由)	August 25, 2007
47	14	"The Strongest, Invincible Style"; Transliteration: "Saikyō Muteki no Ryūha" (Japanese: 最強無敵の流派)	September 1, 2007
48	15	"Flow of Battle"; Transliteration: "Shōbu no Yukue" (Japanese: 勝負の行方)	September 8, 2007
49	16	"Requiem Rain"; Transliteration: "Rekuiemu no Ame" (Japanese: 鎮魂歌(レクイエム)の雨)	September 15, 2007
50	17	"The Guardian of the Mist Ring Arrives!?"; Transliteration: "Kiri no Shugosha, Kuru!?" (Japanese: 霧の守護者、来る！？)	September 22, 2007
51	18	"Illusion vs. Illusion"; Transliteration: "Genjutsu vs Genjutsu" (Japanese: 幻術vs.幻術)	September 29, 2007
52	19	"The Truth About the Mist"; Transliteration: "Kiri no Shinjitsu" (Japanese: 霧の真実)	October 6, 2007
53	20	"A Hint of Uneasiness"; Transliteration: "Ichimatsu no Fuan" (Japanese: 一抹の不安)	October 13, 2007
54	21	"The Cloud Guardian's Rampage"; Transliteration: "Kumo no Shugosha no Bōsō" (Japanese: 雲の守護者の暴走)	October 20, 2007
55	22	"Determination"; Transliteration: "Ketsui" (Japanese: 決意)	October 27, 2007
56	23	"Gokudera's Story"; Transliteration: "Gokudera no Hanashi" (Japanese: ごくでらのはなし)	November 3, 2007
57	24	"The Sky Ring Battle Begins!"; Transliteration: "Ōzora-sen, Hajimaru !" (Japanese: 大空戦、始まる！)	November 10, 2007
58	25	"Flame of Fury"; Transliteration: "Funnu no Honō" (Japanese: 憤怒の炎)	November 17, 2007
59	26	"Supporters"; Transliteration: "Engo suru Mono-tachi" (Japanese: 援護する者たち)	November 24, 2007
60	27	"Deathperate Zero Point Breakthrough"; Transliteration: "Shinuki no Zero Chiten Toppa" (Japanese: 死ぬ気の零地点突破)	December 1, 2007
61	28	"Zero Point Breakthrough Revised"; Transliteration: "Zero Chiten Toppa Kai" (Japanese: 零地点突破・改)	December 8, 2007
62	29	"Tactics"; Transliteration: "Kakehiki" (Japanese: 駆け引き)	December 15, 2007
63	30	"Freezing Flame"; Transliteration: "Kōritsuku Honō" (Japanese: 凍りつく炎)	December 22, 2007
64	31	"The Truth Behind The Rage"; Transliteration: "Ikari no Shinsō" (Japanese: 怒りの真相)	January 5, 2008
65	32	"Conclusion!"; Transliteration: "Ketchaku!" (Japanese: 決着！)	January 12, 2008

=== Season 3: Daily Chapter (2008) ===
No. overall	No. in season	Title	Original release date
66	1	"Shivering Ghost"; Transliteration: "Furuete Gōsuto" (Japanese: ふるえてゴースト)	January 19, 2008
67	2	"Vongola-style Open House"; Transliteration: "Bongore Shiki Jugyōsankan" (Japanese: ボンゴレ式授業参観)	January 26, 2008
68	3	"Happy? Wedding"; Transliteration: "Happii? Wedingu" (Japanese: ハッピー? ウェディング)	February 2, 2008
69	4	"Crazy Criminal Brother Trio"; Transliteration: "Tondemo Hanzai San Kyōdai" (Japanese: とんでも犯罪3兄弟)	February 9, 2008
70	5	"The Misfortune of Shoichi Irie"; Transliteration: "Irie Shōichi no Sainan" (Japanese: 入江正一の災難)	February 16, 2008
71	6	"Fighting Spirit! Absolute Evil Fist"; Transliteration: "Kihaku de Shōbu! Zettai Maken" (Japanese: 気迫で勝負!絶対魔拳)	February 23, 2008
72	7	"Expulsion Crisis"; Transliteration: "Taigaku Kuraishisu" (Japanese: 退学クライシス)	March 1, 2008
73	8	"Mother's Day Vongola-style"; Transliteration: "Kāsan Kansha no Hi" (Japanese: 母さん感謝の日)	March 8, 2008

=== Season 4: The Future (2008) ===
No. overall	No. in season	Title	Original release date
74	1	"The World 10 Years Later"; Transliteration: "Jūnen-go no Sekai" (Japanese: 10年後の世界)	March 15, 2008
75	2	"Secret Base"; Transliteration: "Ajito" (Japanese: アジト)	March 22, 2008
76	3	"Search for the Guardians"; Transliteration: "Shugosha Sagashi" (Japanese: 守護者探し)	March 29, 2008
77	4	"Flame of Resolve"; Transliteration: "Kakugo no Honō" (Japanese: 覚悟の炎)	April 5, 2008
78	5	"Clues to The Past"; Transliteration: "Kako e no Tegakari" (Japanese: 過去への手がかり)	April 12, 2008
79	6	"The First Trial"; Transliteration: "Saisho no Shiren" (Japanese: 最初の試練)	April 19, 2008
80	7	"Discord"; Transliteration: "Fukyō Waon" (Japanese: 不協和音)	April 26, 2008
81	8	"Combination"; Transliteration: "Konbinēshon" (Japanese: コンビネーション)	May 3, 2008
82	9	"The Strongest Guardian"; Transliteration: "Saikyō no Shugosha" (Japanese: 最強の守護者)	May 10, 2008
83	10	"Information Divulged"; Transliteration: "Motarasareta Jōhō" (Japanese: もたらされた情報)	May 17, 2008
84	11	"The Long Road Home"; Transliteration: "Tōsugiru Ieji" (Japanese: 遠すぎる家路)	May 24, 2008
85	12	"Where's the Base?"; Transliteration: "Ajito wa Doko da ?" (Japanese: アジトはどこだ?)	May 31, 2008
86	13	"The Most Terrifying Tutor"; Transliteration: "Saikyō no Katei Kyōshi" (Japanese: 最恐の家庭教師)	June 7, 2008
87	14	"Succession"; Transliteration: "Keishō" (Japanese: 継承)	June 14, 2008
88	15	"7³ Policy"; Transliteration: "Turi ni Sette" (Japanese: 7³(トゥリニセッテ))	June 21, 2008
89	16	"Piano of Sorrow"; Transliteration: "Kanashimi no Piano" (Japanese: 悲しみのピアノ)	June 28, 2008
90	17	"Gufo di Pioggia"; Transliteration: "Gūfo di Piojja" (Japanese: 雨フクロウ(グーフォ・ディ・ピオッジャ))	July 5, 2008
91	18	"What You Believe In"; Transliteration: "Shinjiru Mono" (Japanese: 信じるもの)	July 12, 2008
92	19	"Your Choice"; Transliteration: "Yudanerareta Sentaku" (Japanese: 委ねられた選択)	July 19, 2008
93	20	"Level D Security Alert"; Transliteration: "Kinkyū Keikai Reberu D" (Japanese: 緊急警戒レベルD)	July 26, 2008
94	21	"Identity Revealed"; Transliteration: "Abakareta Shōtai" (Japanese: 暴かれた正体)	August 2, 2008
95	22	"Determination"; Transliteration: "Ketsudan" (Japanese: 決断)	August 9, 2008
96	23	"X BURNER"; Transliteration: "Ikusu Bānā" (Japanese: X(イクス)バーナー)	August 23, 2008
97	24	"The Great Chase"; Transliteration: "Daitsuiseki" (Japanese: 大追跡)	August 30, 2008
98	25	"Declaration of War"; Transliteration: "Sengen" (Japanese: 宣言)	September 6, 2008
99	26	"The Final Trial"; Transliteration: "Saishū Shiren" (Japanese: 最終試練)	September 13, 2008
100	27	"The Night Before the Raid"; Transliteration: "Totsunyū Zenya" (Japanese: 突入前夜)	September 20, 2008
101	28	"Night Attack"; Transliteration: "Yashū" (Japanese: 夜襲)	September 27, 2008

=== Season 5: The Future X (2008–09) ===
No. overall	No. in season	Title	Original release date
102	1	"Mission Start"; Transliteration: "Sakusen Kaishi" (Japanese: 作戦開始)	October 4, 2008
103	2	"The First Barrier"; Transliteration: "Dai'ichi Kanmon" (Japanese: 第一関門)	October 11, 2008
104	3	"Magician of Fate"; Transliteration: "In'nen no Majishan" (Japanese: 因縁の魔導師(マジシャン))	October 18, 2008
105	4	"Regret"; Transliteration: "Kōkai" (Japanese: 後悔)	October 25, 2008
106	5	"The Student's Maturation"; Transliteration: "Oshiego-tachi no Seichō" (Japanese: 教え子たちの成長)	November 1, 2008
107	6	"Absolute Desperation"; Transliteration: "Zettai Zetsumei" (Japanese: 絶体絶命)	November 8, 2008
108	7	"A Man's Box Weapon"; Transliteration: "Otoko no Bokkusu Heiki" (Japanese: 漢(おとこ)の匣(ボックス)兵器)	November 15, 2008
109	8	"Captive"; Transliteration: "Toraware" (Japanese: 囚われ)	November 22, 2008
110	9	"The Secret of Merone Base"; Transliteration: "Merōne Kichi no Himitsu" (Japanese: メローネ基地の秘密)	November 29, 2008
111	10	"The Enemy is Octopus Head"; Transliteration: "Teki wa Tako Heddo" (Japanese: 敵はタコヘッド)	December 6, 2008
112	11	"Boomerang Trap"; Transliteration: "Būmeran no Wana" (Japanese: ブーメランの罠)	December 13, 2008
113	12	"Lightning Strikes Again"; Transliteration: "Denkō, Sairai" (Japanese: 電光、再来)	December 20, 2008
114	13	"The Storm Guardian, Stands"; Transliteration: "Arashi no Shugosha, Tatsu" (Japanese: 嵐の守護者, 立つ)	December 27, 2008
115	14	"SISTEMA C.A.I."; Transliteration: "Sisutēma C.A.I." (Japanese: スィステーマC.A.I.)	January 10, 2009
116	15	"Difference in Resolve"; Transliteration: "Kakugo no Sa" (Japanese: 覚悟の差)	January 17, 2009
117	16	"Storm Fights Back"; Transliteration: "Arashi no Gyakushū" (Japanese: 嵐の逆襲)	January 24, 2009
118	17	"The Princess's Conviction"; Transliteration: "Hime no Ketsui" (Japanese: 姫の決意)	January 31, 2009
119	18	"Interval Between Battles"; Transliteration: "Tatakai no Hazama" (Japanese: 戦いの狭間)	February 7, 2009
120	19	"Virtual Space"; Transliteration: "Kasō Kūkan" (Japanese: 仮想空間)	February 14, 2009
121	20	"Two Battles"; Transliteration: "Futatsu no Tatakai" (Japanese: ふたつの戦い)	February 21, 2009
122	21	"The Ultimate Swordsman"; Transliteration: "Saikyō no Kenshi" (Japanese: 最強の剣士)	February 28, 2009
123	22	"Teachings of the Sword Emperor"; Transliteration: "Kentei no Oshie" (Japanese: 剣帝の教え)	March 7, 2009
124	23	"Obstructing Mist"; Transliteration: "Tachi Hadakaru Kiri" (Japanese: 立ちはだかる霧)	March 14, 2009
125	24	"More Intruders"; Transliteration: "Saranaru Shinyūsha" (Japanese: さらなる侵入者)	March 21, 2009
126	25	"The Strongest versus The Strongest"; Transliteration: "Saikyō VS Saikyō" (Japanese: 最強VS最強)	March 28, 2009
127	26	"A Bewitching Flower"; Transliteration: "Ayakashi no Hana" (Japanese: 妖かしの花)	April 4, 2009
128	27	"The Head Prefect Comes"; Transliteration: "Fūki Iinchō, Kuru" (Japanese: 風紀委員長, 来る)	April 11, 2009
129	28	"Operation X"; Transliteration: "Operēshin Ikusu" (Japanese: オペレーションX(イクス))	April 18, 2009
130	29	"Resolve and Irritation"; Transliteration: "Kakugo to Mukatsuki" (Japanese: 覚悟とムカツキ)	April 25, 2009
131	30	"Rampage"; Transliteration: "Bōsō" (Japanese: 暴走)	May 2, 2009
132	31	"Final Block Of Defense"; Transliteration: "Saishū Bōei Burokku" (Japanese: 最終防衛区間(ブロック))	May 9, 2009
133	32	"A Game-Changing Move"; Transliteration: "Gyakuten e no Itte" (Japanese: 逆転への一手)	May 16, 2009
134	33	"Hell Knight"; Transliteration: "Jigoku no Kishi" (Japanese: 地獄の騎士)	May 23, 2009
135	34	"Arrival"; Transliteration: "Tōtatsu!!" (Japanese: 到達！！)	May 30, 2009
136	35	"Revealed Truth"; Transliteration: "Akasareru Shinjutsu" (Japanese: 明かされる真実)	June 6, 2009
137	36	"Main Battle in Italy"; Transliteration: "Italia Shuryoku Sen" (Japanese: イタリア主力戦)	June 13, 2009
138	37	"Twin Princes"; Transliteration: "Futago no Ōji" (Japanese: 双子の王子)	June 20, 2009
139	38	"Furious Roar"; Transliteration: "Ikari no Hōko" (Japanese: 怒りの咆哮)	June 27, 2009
140	39	"Another Sky"; Transliteration: "Mō Hitotsu no Ōzora" (Japanese: もう一つの大空)	July 4, 2009

=== Season 6: Arcobaleno (2009) ===
No. overall	No. in season	Title	Original release date
141	1	"Reunion"; Transliteration: "Saikai" (Japanese: 再会)	July 11, 2009
142	2	"The Strongest Seven"; Transliteration: "Saikyō no Shichinin" (Japanese: 最強の７人)	July 18, 2009
143	3	"Trial #1"; Transliteration: "Dai-ichi no Shiren" (Japanese: 第一の試練)	July 25, 2009
144	4	"The Arcobaleno Seals"; Transliteration: "Arukobarēno no Shirushi" (Japanese: アルコバレーノの印)	August 1, 2009
145	5	"Guardian Showdown! Cloud and Mist"; Transliteration: "Shugosha Taiketsu! Kumo to Kiri" (Japanese: 守護者対決！雲と霧)	August 8, 2009
146	6	"Box Weapon Prototype"; Transliteration: "Bokkusu Heiki Purototaipu" (Japanese: 匣(ボックス)兵器プロトタイプ)	August 15, 2009
147	7	"Catch the Wind"; Transliteration: "Kaze o Tsukamaero" (Japanese: 風をつかまえろ)	August 22, 2009
148	8	"Two Successors of the Sky"; Transliteration: "Ōzora o Tsugu Futari" (Japanese: 大空を継ぐ二人)	August 29, 2009
149	9	"Reborn's Trial"; Transliteration: "Ribōn no Shiren" (Japanese: リボーンの試験)	September 5, 2009
150	10	"A Path is Closed Off"; Transliteration: "Tozasareta Michi" (Japanese: 閉ざされた道)	September 12, 2009
151	11	"Once the Rainbow is Complete"; Transliteration: "Niji no Sorō Toki" (Japanese: 虹のそろう時)	September 19, 2009
152	12	"A Boss' Resolve"; Transliteration: "Bosu no Kakugo" (Japanese: ボスの覚悟)	September 26, 2009
153	13	"The Final Seal"; Transliteration: "Saigo no Shirushi" (Japanese: 最後の印)	October 3, 2009

=== Season 7: The Choice Battle (2009–10) ===
No. overall	No. in season	Title	Original release date
154	1	"To the Next Battle"; Transliteration: "Tsugi Naru Tatakai e" (Japanese: 次なる戦いへ)	October 10, 2009
155	2	"The Real Six Funeral Wreaths"; Transliteration: "Riaru Roku Chōka" (Japanese: 真(リアル)6弔花)	October 17, 2009
156	3	"Inspiring Allies"; Transliteration: "Kokorozuyoi Nakama" (Japanese: 心強い仲間)	October 24, 2009
157	4	"Namimori Holiday"; Transliteration: "Namimori no Kyūjitsu" (Japanese: 並盛の休日)	October 31, 2009
158	5	"A Warm Place"; Transliteration: "Atatakai Basho" (Japanese: あたたかい場所)	November 7, 2009
159	6	"For My Friends"; Transliteration: "Nakama no Tame ni" (Japanese: 仲間のために)	November 14, 2009
160	7	"Gaining Mobility"; Transliteration: "Kidō Ryoku o Teni Irero" (Japanese: 機動力を手に入れろ)	November 21, 2009
161	8	"Airbike"; Transliteration: "Eā Baiku" (Japanese: エアーバイク)	November 28, 2009
162	9	"The Sky Vongola Box"; Transliteration: "Ōzora no Bongore Bokkusu" (Japanese: 大空のボンゴレ匣(ボックス))	December 5, 2009
163	10	"Terror! Turmoil on Base"; Transliteration: "Kyōfu! Ajito Dai Sōdō" (Japanese: 恐怖！アジト大騒動)	December 12, 2009
164	11	"Vongola Box, Training Begins"; Transliteration: "Bongore Bokkusu, Shūgyō Kaishi" (Japanese: ボンゴレ匣(ボックス)、修業開始)	December 19, 2009
165	12	"Boycott Declared"; Transliteration: "Boikotto Sengen" (Japanese: ボイコット宣言)	December 26, 2009
166	13	"With the Same Heart"; Transliteration: "Onaji Kokoro de" (Japanese: 同じ心で)	January 9, 2010
167	14	"Day of the Battle"; Transliteration: "Kessen no Hi" (Japanese: 決戦の日)	January 16, 2010
168	15	"Choice Begins"; Transliteration: "Choisu Kaishi" (Japanese: チョイス開始)	January 23, 2010
169	16	"Sky Lion: Leone di Cielo ver. Vongola"; Transliteration: "Reone Di Chēri Bājon Bongore" (Japanese: 天空ライオン(レオネ・ディ・チェーリ) Ver.V(バージョンボンゴレ))	January 30, 2010
170	17	"Fateful Showdown"; Transliteration: "Innen no Taiketsu" (Japanese: 因縁の対決)	February 6, 2010
171	18	"Revenge"; Transliteration: "Ribenji" (Japanese: リベンジ)	February 13, 2010
172	19	"Kikyo's Assault"; Transliteration: "Kikyō Kyōshū" (Japanese: 桔梗強襲)	February 20, 2010
173	20	"Choice Ends"; Transliteration: "Choisu Kecchaku" (Japanese: チョイス決着！)	February 27, 2010
174	21	"The Truth about the Future"; Transliteration: "Mirai no Shinsō" (Japanese: 未来の真相)	March 6, 2010
175	22	"Yuni Comes"; Transliteration: "Yuni Kōrin" (Japanese: ユニ光臨)	March 13, 2010
176	23	"Escape"; Transliteration: "Dasshutsu" (Japanese: 脱出)	March 20, 2010
177	24	"After the Battle"; Transliteration: "Tatakai no Ato" (Japanese: 戦いの後)	March 27, 2010

=== Season 8: The Original Family of "Vongola" (2010) ===
No. overall	No. in season	Title	Original release date
178	1	"The Primo Family Arrives!"; Transliteration: "Purīmo Famirī Kuru!" (Japanese: I世(プリーモ)ファミリー来る！)	April 3, 2010
179	2	"Inheritance Begins"; Transliteration: "Keishō Kaishi" (Japanese: 継承・開始)	April 10, 2010
180	3	"The Duty of the Rain Guardian"; Transliteration: "Ame no Shugosha no Shimei" (Japanese: 雨の守護者の使命)	April 17, 2010
181	4	"Furious Bolt of Lightning"; Transliteration: "Hageshiki Raigeki" (Japanese: 激しき雷撃)	April 24, 2010
182	5	"Silent Storm"; Transliteration: "Shizuka Naru Arashi" (Japanese: 静かなる嵐)	May 1, 2010
183	6	"Aloof Cloud"; Transliteration: "Kokō no Ukigumo" (Japanese: 孤高の浮雲)	May 8, 2010
184	7	"Sunny then Cloudy"; Transliteration: "Hare Nochi Kumo" (Japanese: 晴のち雲)	May 15, 2010
185	8	"The Trap is Set"; Transliteration: "Shikake Rareta Wana" (Japanese: 仕掛けられた罠)	May 22, 2010
186	9	"Bewitching Mist"; Transliteration: "Genwaku no Kiri" (Japanese: 幻惑の霧)	May 29, 2010
187	10	"Memories of Betrayal"; Transliteration: "Uragiri no Kioku" (Japanese: 裏切りの記憶)	June 5, 2010
188	11	"Primo's Will"; Transliteration: "Purīmo no Ishi" (Japanese: I世の意志)	June 12, 2010
189	12	"The Family's Resolve"; Transliteration: "Famirii no Kakugo" (Japanese: ファミリーの覚悟)	June 19, 2010

=== Season 9: The Final Battle (2010) ===
No. overall	No. in season	Title	Original release date
190	1	"The Real Six Funeral Wreaths Attack!"; Transliteration: "Riaru Roku Chōka Shurai!" (Japanese: 真6弔花襲来！)	June 26, 2010
191	2	"Open Carnage Box"; Transliteration: "Shura Kaikō" (Japanese: 修羅開匣)	July 3, 2010
192	3	"Alaude's Handcuffs"; Transliteration: "Araudi no Tejō" (Japanese: アラウディの手錠)	July 10, 2010
193	4	"Daemon Spade's Devil Lens"; Transliteration: "Deimon Supēdo no Ma Renzu" (Japanese: D・スペードの魔レンズ)	July 17, 2010
194	5	"The Final Battle Begins"; Transliteration: "Kessen Kaishi" (Japanese: 決戦開始)	July 24, 2010
195	6	"G's Archery"; Transliteration: "G no Acherī" (Japanese: Gの弓矢)	July 31, 2010
196	7	"Lampo's Shield"; Transliteration: "Ranpō no Shīrudo" (Japanese: ランポウの盾)	August 7, 2010
197	8	"Knuckle's Maximum Break"; Transliteration: "Nakkuru no Makishimamu Bureiku" (Japanese: ナックルの極限ブレイク)	August 14, 2010
198	9	"The Last Real Funeral Wreath"; Transliteration: "Saigo no Riaru Roku Chōka" (Japanese: 最後の真６弔花)	August 21, 2010
199	10	"Ghost Awakens"; Transliteration: "Gōsuto Kakusei" (Japanese: Ghost 覚醒)	August 28, 2010
200	11	"Sky Full of Desire"; Transliteration: "Yokubō ni Michita Ōzora" (Japanese: 欲望に満ちた大空)	September 4, 2010
201	12	"Precious Moments in Time"; Transliteration: "Subete ga Daiji na Jikan" (Japanese: 全てが大事な時間)	September 11, 2010
202	13	"Sea. Clam. Rainbow."; Transliteration: "Umi. Kai. Niji." (Japanese: 「海」「貝」「虹」)	September 18, 2010
203	14	"To a New Future"; Transliteration: "Atarashii Mirai e" (Japanese: 新しい未来へ)	September 25, 2010

== OVAs ==
No.	Title	Original release date
1	"Katekyo Hitman Reborn! Special"; Transliteration: "Kateikyōshi Hittoman REBORN! Bongorefamirī sō tōjō!! Bongore-Shiki shūgakuryokō, kuru!!" (Japanese: 家庭教師ヒットマンREBORN! ボンゴレファミリー総登場! ボンゴレ式修学旅行、来る!!)	March 14, 2010
2	"Katekyo Hitman Reborn! x ēlDLIVE Special"; Transliteration: "Kateikyōshi Hittoman REBORN! X Erudoraibu SP korabominianime 24H" (Japanese: 家庭教師ヒットマンREBORN!×エルドライブ【ēlDLIVE】』SPコラボミニアニメ[24H])	July 28, 2016

== Home media releases ==
Marvelous Entertainment, the Japanese company that handles the DVD distribution of the series, released the first volume on January 26, 2007. Each disc contains special features. A total of twenty-four volumes have been released in Japan as of February 27, 2009. Volumes twenty-five to twenty-eight are scheduled to have consecutive monthly releases this year. So far, only Region 2 coded DVDs have been released in Japan.

Each volume has so far contained only one disc, with each containing four episodes, save the eighth volume ("Bullet 8"), which contains five episodes. Besides the secondary volume titles - Bullet, Battle, Daily Chapter, Burn, X.Burn and Choice - there are also subtitles below the Reborn! title in the Battle and Burn volumes. The Battle volumes are subtitled "vs Varia", while the Burn volumes are subtitled "The Future".

On April 19, 2017, the first Blu-ray box was released, including episodes 1-73 and two bonus drama CDs. The second box includes episodes 74-141 and one bonus drama CD. Lastly the third box includes episodes 142-203 and also one bonus drama CD and a bonus disc.

Bullet
Volume	Release date		Discs	Episodes
Volume	Region 2	Region 3	Discs	Episodes
Bullet.1	January 26, 2007	August 31, 2007	1	1–4
Bullet.2	February 23, 2007	August 31, 2007	1	5–8
Bullet.3	March 21, 2007	August 31, 2007	1	9–12
Bullet.4	April 27, 2007	August 31, 2007	1	13–16
Bullet.5	May 25, 2007	September 12, 2007	1	17–20
Bullet.6	June 29, 2007	October 18, 2007	1	21–24
Bullet.7	July 27, 2007	December 3, 2007	1	25–28
Bullet.8	August 31, 2007	December 14, 2007	1	29–33

Battle
Volume	Release date		Discs	Episodes
Volume	Region 2	Region 3	Discs	Episodes
Battle.1	November 30, 2007	March 21, 2008	1	34–37
Battle.2	December 21, 2007	March 28, 2008	1	38–41
Battle.3	January 25, 2008	May 2, 2008	1	42–45
Battle.4	February 29, 2008	May 2, 2008	1	46–49
Battle.5	March 19, 2008	July 14, 2008	1	50–53
Battle.6	April 25, 2008	July 14, 2008	1	54–57
Battle.7	May 30, 2008	August 15, 2008	1	58–61
Battle.8	June 27, 2008	September 17, 2008	1	62–65

Daily Chapter
Volume	Release date		Discs	Episodes
Volume	Region 2	Region 3	Discs	Episodes
Daily Chapter 1	July 25, 2008	December 9, 2008	1	66–69
Daily Chapter 2	August 29, 2008	December 9, 2008	1	70–73

The Future
Volume	Release date		Discs	Episodes
Volume	Region 2	Region 3	Discs	Episodes
Burn.1	September 17, 2008	January 16, 2009	1	74–77
Burn.2	October 31, 2008	February 6, 2009	1	78–81
Burn.3	November 28, 2008	February 6, 2009	1	82–85
Burn.4	December 26, 2008	April 17, 2009	1	86–89
Burn.5	January 30, 2009	April 30, 2009	1	90–93
Burn.6	February 27, 2009	June 19, 2009	1	94–97
Burn.7	March 18, 2009	July 17, 2009	1	98–101

The Future X
Volume	Release date		Discs	Episodes
Volume	Region 2	Region 3	Discs	Episodes
X-Burn.1	April 24, 2009	October 7, 2009	1	102–105
X-Burn.2	May 29, 2009	October 7, 2009	1	106–109
X-Burn.3	June 26, 2009	November 20, 2009	1	110–113
X-Burn.4	July 24, 2009	March 5, 2010	1	114–117
X-Burn.5	August 28, 2009	March 5, 2010	1	118–121
X-Burn.6	September 16, 2009	March 5, 2010	1	122–125
X-Burn.7	October 30, 2009	May 12, 2010	1	126–129
X-Burn.8	November 27, 2009	May 12, 2010	1	130–133
X-Burn.9	December 16, 2009	August 16, 2010	1	134–137
X-Burn.10	January 29, 2010	August 16, 2010	1	138–141

Arcobaleno
Volume	Release date		Discs	Episodes
Volume	Region 2	Region 3	Discs	Episodes
First Volume	February 26, 2010	November 4, 2010	1	142–145
Middle Volume	March 17, 2010	November 4, 2010	1	146–149
Final Volume	April 30, 2010	November 4, 2010	1	150–153

The Choice Battle
Volume	Release date		Discs	Episodes
Volume	Region 2	Region 3	Discs	Episodes
Choice.1	May 28, 2010	December 9, 2010	1	154–157
Choice.2	June 25, 2010	March 4, 2011	1	158–161
Choice.3	July 21, 2010	March 22, 2011	1	162–165
Choice.4	August 27, 2010	May 24, 2011	1	166–169
Choice.5	September 15, 2010	May 24, 2011	1	170–173
Choice.6	October 29, 2010	June 22, 2011	1	174–177

The Original Family of "Vongola"
Volume	Release date		Discs	Episodes
Volume	Region 2	Region 3	Discs	Episodes
First Volume	November 26, 2010	July 5, 2011	1	178–181
Middle Volume	December 15, 2010	August 9, 2011	1	182–185
Final Volume	January 28, 2011	September 21, 2011	1	186–189

The Final Battle
Volume	Release date		Discs	Episodes
Volume	Region 2	Region 3	Discs	Episodes
Final.1	February 25, 2011	October 18, 2011	1	190–193
Final.2	March 16, 2011	December 6, 2011	1	194–198
Final.3	April 29, 2011	December 21, 2011	1	199–203

=== Compilations ===
Season boxes
Season	Volume	Release date		Discs	Episodes
Season	Volume	Region 2	Region 3	Discs	Episodes
Season 1	Bullet Box	June 17, 2009	June 18, 2010	8	1–33
Season 2	Battle Box	March 3, 2010	December 9, 2010	8	34–65
Seasons 3 & 4	Future Box	March 2, 2011	—N/a	9	66–101
Season 5	X-Future Box	September 21, 2011	—N/a	10	102–141
Season 7	Final Future Box	March 21, 2012	—N/a	9	154–177
Season 9	Final Future Box	March 21, 2012	—N/a	9	190–203

- Note: There are no box sets for Season 6 (Eps. 142–153) and Season 8 (Eps. 178–189), which are anime original and not found in the original manga.

=== Blu-ray box sets ===
- Note: All Blu-ray discs are not restricted by DVD region code.

Box #	Release date	Discs	Episodes
1	April 19, 2017	10 + 2 CDs	1–73
2	May 17, 2017	10 + 1 CD	74–141
3	June 21, 2017	9 + 2 CDs	142–203

=== Discotek Media SD on BD sets ===
Season	Volume	Release date	Discs	Episodes
Season	Volume	Region A	Discs	Episodes
Seasons 1–4	Volume 1	September 25, 2018	2	1–101
Seasons 5–9	Volume 2	October 30, 2018	2	102–203

== See also ==
- List of Reborn! chapters
- List of Reborn! characters
