= List of Reborn! chapters =

First tankōbon volume cover, released by Shueisha on October 4, 2004

The chapters of the manga series Reborn!, titled as Katekyō Hitman Reborn! in Japan, are written and drawn by Akira Amano and have been serialized in the shōnen manga anthology Weekly Shōnen Jump by Shueisha since its premiere on May 31, 2004, and ran until its conclusion on November 12, 2012, with the final 42nd volume released in March 2013. The series revolves around the life of 14-year-old Tsunayoshi "Tsuna" Sawada, a timid boy who finds out that he is the next in line to become the boss of the most powerful Mafia organization, the Vongola Family. As such, the Vongola's most powerful hitman, a gun-toting infant named Reborn, is sent to tutor Tsuna on how to become a respectable boss.

Since its premiere, over four hundred chapters, which are each referred to as a "Target" (標的, Tāgetto), have been released in Japan. The manga has been adapted into an anime series by Artland and it premiered on the Japanese network TV Tokyo on October 7, 2006. On September 21, 2006, Viz Media announced that they licensed the manga for an English language release in North America. The manga has also been licensed in France by Glénat, in Spain by Planeta DeAgostini, and is released in Germany by Tokyopop.

The individual chapters are published in tankōbon volumes by Shueisha. The first volume was released on October 4, 2004, forty two volumes have been released. Viz released the first collected volume on October 3, 2006, under their "Shōnen Jump Advanced" imprint, and a total of sixteen volumes have been released.

== Volume list ==
=== Volumes 1–20 ===
No.	Title	Original release date	English release date
1	Reborn Arrives! Ribōn Kuru! (リボーン来る!)	October 4, 2004; 978-4-08-873680-8	October 3, 2006; 978-1-4215-0671-5
Target 001. "The Guy From Italy" (イタリアからやってきたアイツ, "Itaria Kara Yattekita Aitsu"); Target 002. "The Deathperation Shot Won't Work" (死ぬ気弾使用不能, "Shinu Ki Dan Shiyō Funō"); Target 003. "Hayato Gokudera" (獄寺隼人, "Gokudera Hayato"); Target 004. "Expulsion Crisis" (退学クライシス, "Taigaku Kuraishisu"); Target 005. "Takeshi Yamamoto" (山本武, "Yamamoto Takeshi"); Target 006. "Russian Roulette" (ロシアンルーレット, "Roshian Rūretto"); Target 007. "Crybaby Lambo" (泣き虫ランボ, "Nakimushi Ranbo")
Infant Reborn is a hitman for the Mafia. He is sent to Japan to train teenager Tsunayoshi "Tsuna" Sawada so that he can become the next boss of the most powerful Mafia group, the Vongola Family. Tsuna considers himself a loser until Reborn shoots him with the "Dying Will Bullet". This makes him stronger physically and mentally, allowing him to perform amazing feats. He is eventually able to become friendly with his crush, Kyoko Sasagawa, and befriends baseball player Takeshi Yamamoto after stopping him from committing suicide. As part of his training, he begins meeting members of the Mafia, who have mixed reactions to him. Dynamite expert Hayato Gokudera initially wishes to kill the boy, but later strives to become his right-hand man. Another infant assassin, Lambo, introduces himself by trying to kill Reborn, but instead starts living with them.
2	Many Arrives! Iroiro Kuru! (いろいろ来る!)	December 27, 2004; 978-4-08-873699-0	January 2, 2007; 978-1-4215-0672-2
Target 008. "Family Entrance Examination" (入ファミリー試験, "Nyū Famirī Shiken"); Target 009. "Bianchi" (ビアンキ, "Bianki"); Target 010. "Poison Cooking II" (ポイズンクッキングII, "Poizun Kukkingu Tsū"); Target 011. "Haru Miura" (三浦ハル, "Miura Haru"); Target 012. "Problem 7" (問7, "Toi Nana"); Target 013. "Shoichi Irie" (入江正一, "Irie Shōichi"); Target 014. "Ryohei Sasagawa" (笹川了平, "Sasagawa Ryōhei"); Target 015. "Dr. Shamal" (Dr.シャマル, "Dokutā Shamaru"); Target 016. "Kyoya Hibari" (雲雀恭弥, "Hibari Kyōya")
An assassin named Bianchi travels to Japan to kill Tsuna, so Reborn – the person she loves – can be free from his duties, but Tsuna manages to survive each of her attacks. Another girl named Haru Miura is also infatuated with Reborn, but after being saved by Tsuna, she ends up having a crush on this boy. Meanwhile, Reborn starts gathering people to make them part of Tsuna's own family, and arranges a boxing fight between Tsuna and Kyoko's brother, Ryohei, whom the former later becomes friend's with. He also arranges Tsuna, Gokudera, and Yamamoto to fight against Kyoya Hibari, their school's Disciplinary Committee leader, who defeats them, though becomes impressed with Reborn. Another assassin called Doctor Shamal meets Tsuna and heals him from an illness caused by the overuse of the Dying Will Bullet.
3	Faintly Arrives! Hon'nori Kuru! (ほんのり来る!)	March 4, 2005; 978-4-08-873783-6	April 3, 2007; 978-1-4215-0843-6
Target 017. "Bodaoshi (Part One)" (棒倒し(前編), "Bōtaoshi (Zenpen)"); Target 018. "Bodaoshi (Part Two)" (棒倒し(後編), "Bōtaoshi (Kōhen)"); Target 019. "First Kill" (はじめての殺し, "Hajimete no Koroshi"); Target 020. "Eat and Run" (食い逃げ, "Kuinige"); Target 021. "Babysitter" (保育係, "Hoikugakari"); Target 022. "Birthday Party" (バースデー, "Bāsudē"); Target 023. "I-Pin" (イーピン, "Īpin"); Target 024. "I-Pin vs. Lambo" (イーピンVS.ランボ, "Īpin Bāsasu Ranbo"); Target 025. "Kyoko vs. Haru" (京子VS.ハル, "Kyōko Bāsasu Haru")
An athletic festival starts in Namimori Middle School and Tsuna is forced by Reborn to enter. However, after several competitions, Tsuna's team loses and all the students end up fighting. Reborn also tests Tsuna by making him think he killed a thief, but the would-be victim turns out to be working for the Vongola. Later, Reborn starts a Mafia competition for his own birthday, which lands Tsuna, whose birthday was on the same day, in the hospital. One day, another infant assassin named I-Pin appears in order to kill Tsuna, only to discover that she mistook him for someone else, so she ends up living with Tsuna as well. When I-Pin later befriends Haru and Kyoko, she unknowingly gives them poisoned dumplings, however, they survive when Reborn shoots them with Dying Will Bullets.
4	Bucking Bronco Arrives! Haneuma Kuru! (はねうま来る!)	May 2, 2005; 978-4-08-873809-3	July 3, 2007; 978-1-4215-0844-3
Target 026. "The Crime Brothers" (犯罪の3兄弟, "Hanzai no San Kyōdai"); Target 027. "Bronco Dino" (跳ね馬ディーノ, "Haneuma Dīno"); Target 028. "More Dino" (ディーノ再び, "Dīno Futatabi"); Target 029. "Hospitalized" (入院, "Nyūin"); Target 030. "Lost" (遭難, "Sōnan"); Target 031. "New Year's" (お正月, "Oshōgatsu"); Target 032. "Hayato's Training Program" (獄寺強化プログラム, "Gokudera Kyōka Puroguramu"); Target 033. "Parent's Day" (授業参観, "Jugyō Sankan")
Dino, the current boss of the Chiavorone crime family arrives in Japan to meet Tsuna, and also reunite with his former tutor, Reborn. During his stay, his pet turtle, Enzo, incidentally turns into a giant several times, but since he loses his physical abilities when his subordinates are not present, he is always unable to help, though Reborn shoots Tsuna with the Dying Will Bullet to stop it each time. However, Tsuna is injured in the process and is checked into a hospital, where each of his friends cause a ruckus when they visit, annoying both the nurse and Hibari, who punished Tsuna for their actions. When Reborn later takes control of a class at Namimori, he ends up attacking the students who answer wrong.
5	The Prince of Star Arrives! Hoshi no Ōji Kuru! (星の王子来る!)	July 4, 2005; 978-4-08-873831-4	October 2, 2007; 978-1-4215-1099-6
Target 034. "Futa, the Planetary Prince" (星の王子フゥ太, "Hoshi no Ōji Fūta"); Target 035. "Futa Redux" (フゥ太再び, "Fūta Futatabi"); Target 036. "Valentine's Day" (バレンタインデー, "Barentain Dē"); Target 037. "The Snowball Fight Begins" (雪合戦開始, "Yukigassen Kaishi"); Target 038. "Snow Fight Round 2" (雪合戦第2R, "Yukigassen Dai Ni Raundo"); Target 039. "Takeshi's Training Program" (山本トレーニング, "Yamamoto Torēningu"); Target 040. "Dojo Busters" (道場破り, "Dōjō Yaburi"); Target 041. "Malfunction" (故障, "Koshō"); Target 042. "The Zoo" (動物園, "Dōbutsuen")
Tsuna meets a young boy named Futa who ranks people by their abilities. These skills attract several gangs, resulting in Tsuna saving him and becoming friends. One day, Dino organizes a snowball competition with Tsuna and all his friends, however, they all lose consciousness after using all their strength. Later, Reborn decides to train Yamamoto, who thinks that the Mafia is just a game, and is given a baseball bat that transforms into a sword when swung. Another day, Ryohei has a fight against a gang that causes problems in a dojo, but they are defeated by I-pin who becomes a teenager by way of Lambo's bazooka. Lambo also turns into a teenager, whom Kyoko's friend tries to have a date with, but Lambo still retains his childish behavior.
6	Ochōshimono Arrives! Ochōshimono Kuru! (お調子者 来る!)	September 2, 2005; 978-4-08-873853-6	January 1, 2008; 978-1-4215-1474-1
Target 043. "Flower-viewing" (お花見, "Ohanami"); Target 044. "Longchamp Naito" (内藤 ロンシャン, "Naitō Ronshan"); Target 045. "Sorry Shot" (嘆き弾, "Nageki Dan"); Target 046. "Tomaso Family" (ロンシャン家, "Ronshan-chi"); Target 047. "Bowling" (ボウリング, "Bōringu"); Target 048. "Resort" (リゾート, "Rizōto"); Target 049. "Pacifier Warriors" (おしゃぶりの戦士達, "Oshaburi no Senshi-tachi"); Target 050. "Super Performance!!" (大活躍!!, "Dai Katsuyaku!!"); Target 051. "June Bride" (6月の花嫁, "Jūn Buraido")
Longchamp Naito, the Tomaso Family's boss, ends up in the same class as Tsuna during their second year, and thus tries to become friends with Tsuna, even inviting him to his house and to group dates. Later, when Tsuna and his family go on a trip to a Mafia island resort, he meets Arcobaleno Colonnello, who is, along with his rival Reborn, one of the seven strongest infants in the world. He also meets the Arcobaleno Skull, who starts attacking the island. Several Mafia families on the island unite under an unwilling Tsuna in order to defeat Skull and his crew, but Reborn and Colonnello end up as the ones who defeat Skull, ending the battle. Days later, when Bianchi holds a wedding ceremony in order to marry Reborn, the latter does not show up, causing her to go berserk and attack all the wedding guests.
7	Hot Summer Arrives! Atsui Natsu Kuru! (熱い夏来る!)	December 2, 2005; 978-4-08-873889-5	April 1, 2008; 978-1-4215-1664-6
Target 052. "The Weapons Tuner" (武器チューナー, "Buki Chūnā"); Target 053. "The Plot to Assassinate Tsuna" (ツナ暗殺計画, "Tsuna Ansatsu Keikaku"); Target 054. "The Pool Opens" (プール開き, "Pūru Hiraki"); Target 055. "The Tanabata Contest" (七夕大会, "Tanabata Taikai"); Target 056. "The Case of Lambo's Disappearance" (ランボ失踪事件, "Ranbo Shissō Jiken"); Target 057. "Swimming in the Ocean" (海水欲, "Kaisui Yoku"); Target 058. "The Summer Festival" (夏祭り, "Natsu Matsuri"); Target 059. "Haru's Paranoia" (ハル疑心暗鬼, "Haru Gishin'anki"); Target 060. "The Kimodameshi" (肝だめし, "Kimodameshi")
A man called Giannini visits Reborn to make weapon adjustments, but fails each time. When Gokudera is accidentally shot with Lambo's bazooka, he is turned into a small version of himself though ends up thwarting a duo of camouflaged assassins trying to kill Tsuna. In the next days, it is discovered that Tsuna is unable to swim, so all his friends attempt to teach him. Days later, Tsuna is once again taught how to swim, but this time in a competition that a gang made. In other chapters, there is a Halloween party, a Mafia event to entertain senior citizens, a detective game created by Reborn, and a festival in which Tsuna, Gokudera, Yamamoto, and Hibari end up defeating the same gang from the beach.
8	The Neighboring Town Boys Arrives! Tonari Machi Bōizu Kuru! (隣町ボーイズ来る!)	February 3, 2006; 978-4-08-874020-1	July 1, 2008; 978-1-4215-1665-3
Target 061. "Promotion" (昇進, "Shōshin"); Target 062. "Raid" (襲撃, "Shūgeki"); Target 063. "Mukuro Rokudo" (六道 骸, "Rokudō Mukuro"); Target 064. "Hayato Gokudera vs. Chikusa Kakimoto" (獄寺隼人VS.柿本千種, "Gokudera Hayato Bāsasu Kakimoto Chikusa"); Target 065. "Prison Breakers" (脱獄囚, "Datsugokushū"); Target 066. "Departure!!" (出発!!, "Shuppatsu!!"); Target 067. "Takeshi Yamamoto vs. Ken Joshima" (山本武VS.城嶋犬, "Yamamoto Takeshi Bāsasu Jōshima Ken"); Target 068. "Bianchi vs. M.M." (ビアンキVS.M·M, "Bianki Bāsasu Emu Emu"); Target 069. "Birds and Twins" (バーズ&ツインズ, "Bāzu Ando Tsuinzu"); Target 070. "Contact" (接触, "Sesshoku")
The Kokukyo Gang starts attacking the strongest students in Namimori High to get to Tsuna. Hibari encounters the leader, Mukuro Rokudo, but is easily defeated. One of Mukuro's subordinates, Chikusa Kakimoto, finds Gokudera and fights against him. Despite sustaining major injuries, Chikusa attempts to kill Gokudera, but is stopped by Yamamoto. Tsuna is requested by the 9th Vongola boss to stop Mukuro, and he is joined by Reborn, Yamamoto, Gokudera and Bianchi. When they enter Kokuyo's territory, they are confronted by Ken Joshima, whom Yamamoto defeats. They are later attacked by other Kokukyo students who use their friends as hostages, but they are stopped by Dr. Shamal and I-Pin. They are then attacked, knocking out Yamamoto, by a person who is thought to be Mukuro.
9	New Item Arrives! Nyū Aitemu Kuru! (新アイテム来る!)	April 4, 2006; 978-4-08-874042-3	October 7, 2008; 978-1-4215-1666-0
Target 071. "The Final Deathperation Shot" (最後の死ぬ気弾, "Saigo no Shinu Ki Dan"); Target 072. "Tsunayoshi Sawada vs. Fake Mukuro" (澤田綱吉VS.偽骸, "Sawada Tsunayoshi Bāsasu Nise Mukuro"); Target 073. "Charge!!" (突入!!, "Totsunyū!!"); Target 074. "Mind Control" (マインドコントロール, "Maindo Kontorōru"); Target 075. "Skill" (能力, "Sukiru"); Target 076. "Forbidden Shot" (禁弾, "Kin Dan"); Target 077. "Pupils" (教え子達, "Oshiego-tachi"); Target 078. "New Item" (新アイテム, "Nyū Aitemu"); Target 079. "Blood of Vongola" (ブラッド·オブ·ボンゴレ, "Buraddo Obu Bongore"); Omake. I-pin and Lambo
Reborn uses the last Dying Will Bullet he has on Tsuna, who manages to defeat the fake Mukuro. Tsuna realizes that his opponent was being controlled by the real Mukuro so they enter the gang's hideout, leaving an unconscious Yamamoto. When they are attacked by Chikusa and Ken, Gokudera tries to stop them alone, but Hibari reappears there and defeats both of them. Tsuna finds the real Mukuro who reveals his ability to take control of people's bodies. When Mukuro is fatally wounded by Hibari, he starts to possess the bodies around him, including Tsuna's companions. Suddenly, Reborn's pet creates a pair of gloves as well as a new bullet to increase Tsuna's abilities. In the new "Hyper Dying Will Mode", Tsuna manages to safely knock out all the bodies that Mukuro controls, leaving the original as the last one.
10	Ring Arrives! Ringu Kuru! (リング来る)	June 2, 2006; 978-4-08-874110-9	January 6, 2009; 978-1-4215-1667-7
Target 080. "Deathperation Flames" (死ぬ気の炎, "Shinu Ki no Honō"); Target 081. "The End and Afterwards" (終わりとそれから, "Owari to Sorekara"); Target 082. "Feeling a Storm Approach" (嵐の予感, "Arashi no Yokan"); Target 083. "Basil's Goal" (少年の目的, "Shōnen no Mokuteki"); Target 084. "Vongola Half Rings" (ハーフボンゴレリング, "Hāfu Bongore Ringu"); Target 085. "Iemitsu Sawada" (沢田家光, "Sawada Iemitsu"); Target 086. "Everyone Gets a Tutor" (それぞれの家庭教師, "Sorezore no Kateikyōshi"); Target 087. "Lessons Begin!" (レッスン開始!, "Ressun Kaishi!"); Target 088. "What Wasn't Seen" (見えてなかったもの, "Mietenakattamono"); Target 089. "Control of Deathperation" (死ぬ気のコントロール, "Shinu Ki no Kontorōru")
Tsuna defeats Mukuro who, along with the rest of his gang, is arrested by the Mafia's guardians. During the following days, a swordsman appears and attacks a boy called Basil who is in Dying Will mode. He then attacks Tsuna and his friends when he discovers that they are from the Vongola Family. Dino manages to fend off the swordsman and he reveals to Tsuna that the boy was protecting half of the Vongola Rings, seven items which belong to the Vongola's seven most integral members. Reborn tells Tsuna that the Vongola's elite assassination team, the Varia, will come for the rings, so he and the selected six "guardians" have to train. Tsuna starts training with Reborn and Basil while Dino decides to teach Hibari, Colonnello with Ryohei, and Yamamoto with his father. Gokudera asks to train with Dr. Shamal, but Shamal decides not to teach him until he learns to prioritize his life first.
11	Varia Arrives! Variā Kuru! (ヴァリアー来る!)	August 4, 2006; 978-4-08-874142-0	April 7, 2009; 978-1-4215-2436-8
Target 090. "The Varia's Footsteps" (ヴァリアーの足音, "Variā no Ashioto"); Target 091. "The Guardian of Thunder" (雷の守護者, "Kaminari no Shugosha"); Target 092. "Chance Encounter" (邂逅, "Kaikō"); Target 093. "Before the Decisive Battle ("決戦前, "Kessen Mae"); Target 094. "Ryohei Sasagawa vs. Lissuria" (笹川了平VS.ルッスーリア, "Sasagawa Ryōhei Bāsasu Russūria"); Target 095. "Ryohei's Right" (了平の右, "Ryōhei no Migi"); Target 096. "Whereabouts of the Ring of the Sun" (晴のリングのゆくえ, "Hare no Ringu no Yukue"); Target 097. "Lambo vs. Leviathan" (ランボVS.レヴィ·ア·タン, "Ranbo Bāsasu Revi-a-tan"); Target 098. "Lambo 20 Years Later" (20年後のランボ, "Ni-jūnen Go no Ranbo")
The Varia appears in Japan and attacks the Vongola guardians. They are stopped by Tsuna's father, Iemitsu, who tells the leader Xanxus that the owners of the Vongola Rings will be decided in a traditional battle, in which all members with the same type of ring fight against each other. The first fight is between the Sun Ring guardians, Ryohei and a man called Lussuria. Ryohei is seriously injured, but he is able to use all his power when Kyoko appears, allowing the Vongola to win the first fight. The next fight is between Leviathan and Lambo, who has no idea what is happening. Scared by the fight, Lambo uses his bazooka twice to become 20 years older. The future Lambo manages to overpower Leviathan, but when he returns to being an infant, he is almost killed. Tsuna interrupts the fight, unwilling to let him die.
12	Hard Battle Arrives! Hageshii Tatakai Kuru! (激しい戦い来る!)	October 4, 2006; 978-4-08-874265-6	July 7, 2009; 978-1-4215-2437-5
Target 099. "Xanxus' Smile" (XANXUSの笑み, "Zanzasu no Emi"); Target 100. "Prince the Ripper" (プリンズ·ザ·リッパー, "Purinzu za Rippā"); Target 101. "Hayato Gokudera vs. Belphegor" (獄寺隼人VS.ベルフェゴール, "Gokudera Hayato Bāsasu Berufegōru"); Target 102. "Genius' Knife" (天才のナイフ, "Tensai no Naifu"); Target 103. "Surging Waves Attack" (怒涛の攻め, "Dotō no Seme"); Target 104. "End" (決着, "Ketchaku"); Target 105. "Hibari's Return" (雲雀戻る, "Hibari Modoru"); Target 106. "Yamamoto's Choice" (山本の選択, "Yamamoto no Sentaku"); Target 107. "Takeshi Yamamoto vs. Superbi Squalo" (山本武VS.スペルビ·スクアーロ, "Yamamoto Takeshi Bāsasu Superubi Sukuāro")
Tsuna's ring is taken from him for having interfered in Lambo's fight. As such, the battle continues with a tie, but with the Varia having one more ring than the Vongola. The fight of the Storm Guardians starts between Gokudera and Belphegor, who battle inside Namimori High. Belphegor uses "flying" knives to stop all of Gokudera's dynamites. However, Gokudera discovers that all the knives are attached to threads, and manages to injure Bel by improving the movements of his bombs. When the school starts exploding, Gokudera heeds Tsuna's advice of escaping which results in his loss. As Xanxus hints that something happened to the 9th boss, Iemitsu returns to Italy to see what happened to the boss. Meanwhile, the fight between Yamamoto and Superbi Squalo, the swordsman who attacked some time ago, starts at an underground level of the school.
13	The Mist Guardian Arrives! Kiri no Shugosha Kuru! (霧の守護者来る!)	January 4, 2007; 978-4-08-874301-1	October 6, 2009; 978-1-4215-2438-2
Target 108. "The Shigure Souen Style" (時雨蒼燕流, "Shigure Sōen Ryū"); Target 109. "The Guardian of Rain's Message" (雨の守護者の使命, "Ame no Shugosha no Shimei"); Target 110. "8th Method: Pouring Rain" (八の型 篠突く雨, "Hachi no Kata: Shinotsuku Ame"); Target 111. "Conclusion of the Rain's Victory" (雨の勝負の結末, "Ame no Shōbu no Ketsumatsu"); Target 112. "The Guardian of the Mist" (霧の守護者, "Kiri no Shugosha"); Target 113. "Chrome's Attack" (クローム襲撃, "Kurōmu Shūgeki"); Target 114. "Chrome Dokuro vs. Mammon" (クローム髑髏VS.マーモン, "Kurōmu Dokuro Bāsasu Māmon"); Target 115. "Nagi" (凪); Target 116. "Mukuro Arrives!" (骸来る!, "Mukuro Kuru!")
Yamamoto shows the Shigure Souen Style, a swordsmanship style which allows him to manipulate the water from the underground. Squalo reveals that he already knows that style, and both develop their own variations. Yamamoto creates a ninth technique of his style and defeats Squalo, who is attacked by a shark as punishment of his defeat. Before the next fight, Tsuna sees Chikusa and Ken, and thinks the Mist Guardian will be Mukuro, but instead a girl called Chrome Dokuro appears. She fights against Arcobaleno Mammon, and both create illusions to fight, but Chrome is severely injured. Tsuna is then told of how Chrome had lost most her organs and that Mukuro has been sustaining her life. With Chrome unable to continue the fight, Mukuro appears in his own form and takes Chrome's place in the fight against Mammon.
14	The Sky Match Arrives! Ōzora Sen Kuru! (大空戦来る!)	March 2, 2007; 978-4-08-874328-8	January 5, 2010; 978-1-4215-2855-7
Target 117. "3 Victories 3 Defeats" (3勝3敗, "Sanshō Sanpai"); Target 118. "The Last Guardian's Fight" (最後の守護者戦, "Saigo no Shugosha Sen"); Target 119. "Kyoya Hibari vs. Gola Moska" (雲雀 恭弥VS.ゴーラ·モスカ, "Hibari Kyōya Bāsasu Gōra Mosuka"); Target 120. "Kyoya Hibari vs. Xanxus" (雲雀恭弥VS.XANXUS, "Hibari Kyōya Bāsasu Zanzasu"); Target 121. "Gola Moska" (ゴーラ·モスカ, "Gōra Mosuka"); Target 122. "Xanxus' Trick" (XANXUSの企み, "Zanzasu no Takurami"); Target 123. "Tsuna's Determination" (ツナの決意, "Tsuna no Ketsui"); Target 124. "Coming Together" (招集, "Shōshū"); Target 125. "The Sky Battle" (大空戦, "Ōzora Sen")
After Mukuro easily defeats Mammon by using illusions that cause the latter to escape, he disappears, leaving an unconscious Chrome in his place. Though Tsuna left in order to further his training, the next fight begins with Hibari against a robotic giant called Gola Moska. Hibari defeats Moska with only one attack, and then starts attacking Xanxus until Moska gets up and goes berserk, causing great damage to Namimori. Tsuna arrives in time to defeat Moska in his Hyper Dying Will mode, only to discover Moska was a robot powered by the life force of the ninth Vongola boss who was kidnapped by Xanxus. The ninth boss reassures Tsuna, but Xanxus accuses Tsuna of murder. The next day, the last fight between Tsuna and Xanxus starts, and all the guardians, including Lambo who is still unconscious, are drugged and placed in different parts of the school.
15	Zero Point Breakthrough Arrives! Zero Chiten Toppa Kuru! (零地点突破来る!)	May 2, 2007; 978-4-08-874355-4	April 6, 2010; 1-4215-2856-8
Target 126. "Tsunayoshi Sawada vs. Xanxus" (沢田 綱吉VS.XANXUS, "Sawada Tsunayoshi Bāsasu Zanzasu"); Target 127. "The Guardian's Revival!" (守護者復活!, "Shugosha Fukkatsu!"); Target 128. "Fierce Battle" (激戦, "Gekisen"); Target 129. "Breaking the Zero Point of the Dying Will" (死ぬ気の零地点突破, "Shinu Ki no Zero Chiten Toppa"); Target 130. "Revision" (改, "Kai"); Target 131. "Wrath" (怒り, "Ikari"); Target 132. "The First Generation's Zero Point Breakthrough" (初代零地点突破, "Shodai Zero Chiten Toppa"); Target 133. "Blood of Vongola II" (ブラッド·オブ·ボンゴレII, "Buraddo Obu Bongore Tsū"); Target 134. "Variabile X" (VARIABILE X)
The Sky Battle starts, and both Tsuna and Xanxus use different flames to fight. Meanwhile, Hibari sets the other Vongola guardians free in order for them to start facing the other Varia guardians who were freed by Xanxus. Overpowered by Xanxus, Tsuna performs the Dying Will Zero Point Breakthrough, a technique created by the first Vongola boss that allows him to absorb all of Xanxus' flames. Tsuna once again uses the Zero Point Breakthrough to freeze Xanxus, and discovers that he has already been frozen once by the Ninth boss. Mammon and Belphegor try to unfreeze Xanxus by giving him the Vongola Rings, but the rings reject Xanxus since he was just adopted by the Ninth, and thus does not have Vongola blood. The Varia try to call their other companions, but they are all defeated by an unknown person.
16	Ten Years Later Arrives! Jūnen Go Kuru! (10年後来る!)	August 3, 2007; 978-4-08-874401-8	July 6, 2010; 1-4215-2857-6
Target 135. "Party" (パーティー, "Pātī"); Target 136. "The Missing Reborn" (消えたりボーン, "Kieta Ribōn"); Target 137. "The World, 10 Years Later" (10年後の世界, "Jūnen Go no Sekai"); Target 138. "The Battle, 10 Years Later" (10年後の戦い, "Jūnen Go no Tatakai"); Target 139. "Camping" (野宿, "Nojuku"); Target 140. "Hideout" (アジト, "Ajito"); Target 141. "Byakuran" (百蘭); Target 142. "Reunion" (再会, "Saikai"); Target 143. "Resolution" (覚悟, "Kakugo")
Lancia, the man who was used by Mukuro to hide his identity, defeats the remaining Varia members. Meanwhile, Tsuna is declared the winner of the Sky Battle, earning the right to become the Tenth Vongola Boss. One day, Reborn is accidentally shot by Lambo's bazooka and does not reappear. Tsuna uses it and is transported nearly ten years into the future, where he finds an adult Gokudera who is subsequently replaced with the younger Gokudera. After encountering a woman named Lal Mirch and an adult Yamamoto, Tsuna and Gokudera enter a Vongola base where they meet the missing Reborn. Yamamoto tells them that the Millefiore Family is annihilating every member of the Vongola. When Yamamoto goes to train Tsuna and Gokudera, the base is attacked by Millefiore soldiers. They find the older I-pin, Lambo, Haru and Kyoko, who, along with Yamamoto, are then replaced with their younger selves.
17	Hibird Arrives! Hibādo Kuru! (ヒバード来る!)	November 2, 2007; 978-4-08-874434-6	—
Target 144. "The Ring's Power" (リングの力, "Ringu no Chikara"); Target 145. "Shoichi Irie 2" (入江 正一 その2, "Irie Shōichi Sono Ni"); Target 146. "Lal Mirch" (ラル·ミルチ, "Raru Miruchi"); Target 147. "The Red and Blue Flame" (赤と青の炎, "Aka To Ao no Honō"); Target 148. "Surge Ring Box" (波動·リング·匣, "Hadō Ringu Bokkusu"); Target 149. "Two Incidents" (二つの事件, "Futatsu no Jiken"); Target 150. "Those Awaiting" (待ち受ける者, "Machiukerumono"); Target 151. "VS.γ"; Target 152. "Combination" (コンビネーション, "Konbinēshon"); Target 153. "Torture" (拷問, "Gōmon")
Tsuna and Gokudera manage to defeat the Millefiore soldiers using the energy from the Vongola Ring, and return to the base. Gokudera discovers a letter written by his future self informing them that they can return to the past if they defeat the Millefiore leader, Byakuran. Lal Mirch starts training Tsuna, Gokudera, and Yamamoto, and explains to them that the Mafia rings have the ability to open boxes that can unleash flamed weapons or animals. The next day, Kyoko leaves the hideout to find her brother, causing the others to start looking for her. Kyoko is rescued by the adult version of her friend Hana, who tells her the whereabouts of Ryohei. While searching for Kyoko, Gokudera and Yamamoto are attacked by a Millefiore soldier, Gamma. Even after fighting together, Gokudera and Yamamoto are seriously injured, but are saved by an adult Hibari.
18	Ver.V.R. Arrives! Bāshon Bongore Ringu Kuru! (Ver.V.R.来る!)	February 4, 2008; 978-4-08-874476-6	—
Target 154. "Kyoya Hibari vs. Gamma" (雲雀恭弥VS. ガンマ, "Hibari Kyōya Bāsasu Ganma"); Target 155. "Return" (帰還, "Kikan"); Target 156. "Union" (合流, "Gōryū"); Target 157. "Trial" (試練, "Shiren"); Target 158. "Inheritance" (継承, "Keishō"); Target 159. "Ver.V.R."; Target 160. "The Boxes' Mysteries" (匣の謎, "Bokkusu no Nazo"); Target 161. "7³"; Target 162. "The Past" (過去, "Kako"); Target 163. "Chrome Dokuro vs. Glo Xinia" (クローム髑髏VS.グロ·キシニア, "Kurōmu Dokuro Bāsasu Guro Kishinia"); Target 164. "Mukuro and Chrome" (ムクロウとクローム, "Mukurō to Kurōmu")
Hibari easily defeats Gamma and takes Gokudera and Yamamoto to the hideout in order for them to recuperate. Later, the adult Futa and Bianchi arrives at the hideout. While Tsuna trains with Lal Mirch, Hibari interrupts, wanting to test Tsuna. Hibari traps Tsuna within a sphere of cloud flames, where Tsuna starts being questioned by the Vongola bosses about their past's sins. After Tsuna refuses to inherit those sins, the first Vongola improves his X-Gloves' abilities, allowing him to destroy the sphere. Tsuna then faces Hibari, but since the former is unable to control the new flames, he is defeated. While training her younger brother Gokudera, Bianchi explains to him how the boxes were created, though Hibari is suspicious of the reasons of why they were made. Meanwhile, a young Chrome finds herself lost in the future, and is attacked by a Millefiore hitman named Glo Xinia. Before being knocked out, she is awakened by the future Mukuro who was possessing Glo's owl.
19	The Sun After The Mist Arrives! Kiri Nochi Hare Kuru! (霧のち晴来る)	April 4, 2008; 978-4-08-874497-1	—
Target 165. "Mukuro Rokudo vs. Glo Xinia" (六道骸VS.グロ·キシニア, "Rokudō Mukuro Bāsasu Guro Kishinia"); Target 166. "Ryohei Sasagawa, 10 Years Later" (10年後の笹川了平, "Jūnen Go no Sasagawa Ryohei"); Target 167. "The Entrusted Decision" (委ねられた決断, "Yudanerareta Ketsudan"); Target 168. "Leonardo Lippi" (レオナルド·リッピ, "Reonarudo Rippi"); Target 169. "Mukuro Rokudo vs. Byakuran" (六道骸VS.白蘭, "Rokudō Mukuro Bāsasu Byakuran"); Target 170. "Weapon" (武器, "Buki"); Target 171. "Dream" (夢, "Yume"); Target 172. "Threat" (脅威, "Kyōi"); Target 173. "From the Second Sword Emperor" (2代目剣帝より, "Nidaime Kentei Yori"); Target 174. "The Day Before the Final Attack?" (決戦前日?, "Kessen Zenjitsu?")
With adult Mukuro's help, Chrome is able to create solid bodies of Mukuro, Chikusa, and Ken, that defeat Glo Xinia. An adult Ryohei then finds and takes her to the others at the Vongola hideout. Meanwhile, the adult Mukuro uses the body of a Milliefore member to spy on the Millefiore, but he is defeated by Byakuran, causing Chrome's condition to worsen for a short time. The Vongola decide to attack the Milliefore in a few days and continue training. While Tsuna tries to control the new flame through the balance of energy distribution, Gokudera is able to open one of the boxes, releasing a lazy cat, and Yamamoto manages to land one blow on Reborn during practice. Meanwhile, Shoichi Irie, a high-ranking member of the Milliefiore, assembles all members in order to announce an attack on the Vongola hideout.
20	X Burner Arrives! Ikusu Bānā Kuru! (X BURNER来る!)	June 4, 2008; 978-4-08-874525-1	—
Target 175. "Night Assault" (夜襲, "Yashū"); Target 176. "Raid" (侵入, "Shin'nyū"); Target 177. "Tsunayoshi Sawada vs. Dendro Chilum" (沢田綱吉VS.デンドロ·キラム, "Sawada Tsunayoshi Bāsasu Dendoro Kiramu"); Target 178. "Fate" (因縁, "In'nen"); Target 179. "Lal Mirch vs. Ginger Bread" (ラル·ミルチVS.ジンジャー·ブレッド, "Raru Miruchi Bāsasu Jinjā Bureddo"); Target 180. "Regret" (後悔, "Kōkai"); Target 181. "Decoy" (囮, "Otori"); Target 182. "Tsunayoshi Sawada vs. Strau Moska S" (沢田綱吉VS.ストゥラオ·モスカS, "Sawada Tsunayoshi Bāsasu Suturao MosukaS"); Target 183. "King" (キング, "Kingu"); Target 184. "Flight" (飛翔, "Hishō"); Target 185. "Conclusion" (決着, "Ketchaku")
When the Vongola hideout is attacked by Millefiore soldiers, Hibari stays to stop them while Tsuna, Ryohei, Gokudera, Yamamoto, and Lal Mirch secretly raid the Millefiore base. While entering the Millefiore base, the Vongola are attacked by a boy called Ginger Bread who claims to have killed Colonnello. Lal Mirch tries to take revenge for the death of her student, and is able to activate her own Arcobaleno pacifier to increase her power, but Ginger escapes. The Vongola is then attacked once again by a Strau Moska robot controlled by a Millefiore technician named Spanner, and Tsuna stays to fight him. The Moska is able to counter all of Tsuna's attacks, forcing him to use his X Burner technique which uses his stronger flames. Although the attack destroys the Moska, Tsuna falls unconscious being unable to control the X-Burner, and is captured.

=== Volumes 21–42 ===
No.	Title	Original release date	English release date
21	Sistema C.A.I. Arrives! Sisutēma Shī Ē Ai Kuru! (SISTEMA C.A.I.来る!)	September 4, 2008; 978-4-08-874565-7	—
Target 186. "vs. Baishana" (VS.バイシャナ, "Bāsasu Baishana"); Target 187. "Captive" (囚われ, "Toraware"); Target 188. "Ryohei Sasagawa vs. Baishana" (笹川了平VS.バイシャナ, "Sasagawa Ryōhei Bāsasu Baishana"); Target 189. "Melone Base" (メローネ基地, "Merōne Kichi"); Target 190. "VS.γ"; Target 191. "Ryohei Sasagawa vs. γ" (笹川了平VS.γ, "Sasagawa Ryōhei Bāsasu Ganma"); Target 192. "Sistema C.A.I." (SISTEMA C.A.I.); Target 193. "Hayato Gokudera vs. γ" (獄寺 隼人VS.γ, "Gokudera Hayato Bāsasu Ganma"); Target 194. "Sistema C.A.I. 2" (SISTEMA C.A.I.その2, "Sistema C.A.I. Sono Ni"); Target 195. "Uri" (瓜)
Ryohei fights and defeats another Millefiore member named Baishana who uses a giant snake to attack him. Meanwhile, Tsuna is kidnapped by Spanner, who actually wants to help him perfect the X Burner despite the possibility that he is betraying his own family. As the Vongola get closer to Shoichi Irie, the latter uses his abilities to rearrange the rooms of the base, separating Yamamoto and Lal from Gokudera and Ryohei, who are confronted by Gamma. Ryohei fights against him, but when he is defeated, Gokudera replaces him. Gokudera uses the Sistema C.A.I., which allows him to activate several different boxes at the same time. Helped by his cat Uri, which increases in size and strength due to Ryohei's flame energy, he manages to overpower Gamma.
22	Souen Style Special Method Arrives! Sōen Ryū Tokushiki Kuru! (蒼燕流特式来る!)	November 4, 2008; 978-4-08-874592-3	—
Target 196. "Uni and γ" (ユニとγ, "Yuni to Ganma"); tankōbon: "Uni and γ's Past" (ユニとγの過去, "Yuni to Ganma no Kako"): Target 197. "The Gesso and the Giglio Nero" (ジェッソとジッリョネロ, "Jesso to Jirryo Nero"); Target 198. "Genkishi" (幻騎士); Target 199. "Takeshi Yamamoto vs. Genkishi" (山本武VS.幻騎士, "Yamamoto Takeshi Bāsasu Genkishi"); Target 200. "Mist" (霧, "Kiri"); Target 201. "Intruders" (侵入者, "Shin'nyūsha"); Target 202. "Round Device" (丸い装置, "Marui Sōchi"); Target 203. "Kyoya Hibari vs. Genkishi" (雲雀恭弥VS.幻騎士, "Hibari Kyoya Bāsasu Genkishi"); Target 204. "The Reverse Globe of Needles" (裏 球針態, "Ura Kyūshintai"); Target 205. "Awakening" (目覚め, "Mezame")
As both Gokudera and Gamma rest for a short time to finish their fight, Gamma reveals he has a deep hatred of Byakuran, believing that he did something to his boss Uni that caused her to become emotionally detached. Meanwhile, Yamamoto finds and fights Byakuran's strongest subordinate, Genkishi. Yamamoto tries to use the knowledge he gained from the adult Squalo's fights he watched during his training to defeat Genkishi's illusions, but he is knocked out. At the same moment, Chrome, Lambo, I-pin and Hibari's subordinate, Tetsuya Kusakabe, invade the Millefiore base, while Tsuna and Spanner are attacked by several Millefiore members. Before Yamamoto is finished off, the adult Hibari appears to fight against Genkishi. Although he manages to fight at the same level, Hibari runs out of rings and weapons and is overpowered. As Hibari is about to be killed, he is suddenly replaced by his younger self.
23	Tsuna vs. Genkishi Arrives! Tsuna Bāsasu Genkishi Kuru! (ツナVS.幻騎士来る!)	February 4, 2009; 978-4-08-874630-2	—
Target 206. "Discipline" (風紀, "Fūki"); Target 207. "Mechanic Spirit" (メカニック魂, "Mekanikku Damashii"); Target 208. "The Completed X-Burner" (完璧なX BURNER, "Kanpeki na Ikusu Bānā"); Target 209. "The Ring's Flame" (リングの炎, "Ringu no Honō"); Target 210. "Recklessness" (暴走, "Bōsō"); Target 211. "Rush" (突進, "Tosshin"); Target 212. "Last Defense Block" (最終防衛区画, "Saishū Bōei Burokku"); Target 213. "Tsunayoshi Sawada vs. Genkishi" (沢田綱吉VS.幻騎士, "Sawada Tsunayoshi Bāsasu Genkishi"); Target 214. "Surprise" (意表, "Ihyō"); Target 215. "Loyalty" (忠誠, "Chūsei")
The teenager Hibari sees an unconscious Yamamoto and recognizes Genkishi as an enemy. Hibari is unable to defeat Genkishi, and is aided by Chrome and an injured Gokudera. After receiving advice from Tetsuya, Hibari releases a hedgehog from a special box. However, the animal goes berserk and starts destroying part of the base, causing the Vongola and Genkishi to escape. Meanwhile, Tsuna and Spanner face Ginger Bread and Millefiore member Iris Yoka who manage to overpower Tsuna. Using contacts he received from Spanner, Tsuna is able to control the flames from the X Burner and performs it successfully, defeating his enemies. Tsuna, along with Spanner, then goes to confront Irie, but they are attacked by Genkishi. As Tsuna begins to gradually overpower Genkishi, the latter becomes infuriated with him and invokes the true powers of his Hell Ring.
24	The Varia of Ten Years Later Arrives! Jūnen-go Variā Kuru! (10年後ヴァリアー来る!)	April 3, 2009; 978-4-08-874651-7	—
Target 216. "Hell Ring" (ヘルリング, "Heru Ringu"); Target 217. "Hyper Explosion" (超爆発, "Chō Bakuhatsu"); Target 218. "Arrival" (到着, "Tōchaku"); Target 219. "The Truth" (真相, "Shinsō"); Target 220. "We are Varia!!" (We are VARIA!!); Target 221. "Unbelievable Things" (ありえないこと, "Arienai Koto"); Target 222. "Belphegor and Rasiel" (BelphegorとRasiel, "Beru to Zuru"); Target 223. "4 Opened Boxes" (4人開匣, "Yonin Kai Kō"); Target 224. "Xanxus vs. Rasiel" (XANXUS VS. Rasiel); Target 225. "Hybrid (Mix)" (雑種, "Mikkusu"); Target 226. "Xanxus' Flames" (XANXUSの炎, "Zanzasu no Honō")
Using the Hell Ring, Genkishi goes berserk and starts attacking Tsuna with illusions of his friends. Unwilling to fight these illusions, Tsuna freezes them instead and overwhelms Genkishi with a full power X Burner, causing him to escape. Tsuna is then confronted by Irie, who initially uses his real friends as hostages. He frees them however, revealing that he is an ally of Tsuna's future self, who asked him to send Tsuna and his friends to the future so that they will be able to increase their powers to defeat Byakuran. Meanwhile, in accordance with adult Tsuna's plan, the Varia attack a Millefiore base in Italy to defeat the remaining guardians. While Squalo commands the soldiers, Belphegor and the new member Flan are attacked by the Milliefiore guardian Rasiel, who is also Belphegor's twin brother. Rasiel and his butler Olgelt easily defeat the two Varia, but they are then attacked by Xanxus. Using a liger charged with his Dying Will Flame, Xanxus manages to easily pushback the two Millefiore guardians.
25	Vongola Box Arrives! Bongore Bokkusu Kuru! (ボンゴレ匣来る!)	July 3, 2009; 978-4-08-874701-9	—
Target 227. "Real" (真, "Riaru"); Target 228. "Real 6 Funeral Wreaths" (真6弔花, "Riaru Roku Chōka"); Target 229. "Return" (帰還, "Kikan"); Target 230. "Rest" (休息, "Kyūsoku"); Target 231. "Charging" (充電, "Jūden"); Target 232. "Choice" (チョイス, "Choisu"); Target 233. "Bike" (バイク, "Baiku"); Target 234. "Monster" (怪物, "Kaibutsu"); Target 235. "Start Training" (修業開始, "Shugyō Kaishi"); Target 236. "Boycott" (ボイコット, "Boikotto"); Target 237. "Confession" (告白, "Kokuhaku")
As Xanxus defeats Rasiel and Olgelt, Byakuran communicates with the Vongola, telling them that the soldiers they defeated were not the real Millefiore guardians. As the Vongola still need to defeat Byakuran's six strongest subordinates, the Real 6 Funeral Wreaths, before facing him, Irie gives Tsuna and his guardians the Vongola's boxes which can help them in their upcoming fight. Having only ten days to prepare, Tsuna's group, along with the young Ryohei who was also transported into the future, return to their hideout. While training, Tsuna opens his Vongola box, unleashing a mysterious creature which attacks him. After Yamamoto and Basil calm it, Dino's future self arrives to the hideout and guides the Vongola in their training. Wanting to know what is happening with Tsuna and the others, Haru and Kyoko start a boycott until they tell them the truth. Feeling guilty, Tsuna decides to confess to the girls about the Mafia families' fights.
26	Choice Arrives! Choisu Kuru! (チョイス来る!)	October 2, 2009; 978-4-08-874729-3	—
Target 238. "Change" (変化, "Henka"); Target 239. "The Day of the Decisive Battle" (決戦の日, "Kessen no Hi"); Target 240. "Ticket" (チケット, "Chiketto"); Target 241. "Choice Begins!" (チョイス開始!, "Choisu Kaishi!"); Target 242. "Target Rule" (ターゲットルール, "Tāgetto Rūru"); Target 243. "Battle Start!!" (バトルスタート!!, "Batoru Sutāto!!"); Target 244. "Tsuna's Box Weapon" (ツナの匣兵器, "Tsuna no Bokkusu Heiki"); Target 245. "Takeshi Yamamoto vs. Saru" (山本武VS猿, "Yamamoto Takeshi Bāsasu Saru"); Target 246. "Yamamoto's Vongola's Box" (山本のボンゴレ匣, "Yamamoto no Bongore Bokkusu"); Target 247. "Revenge" (リベンジ, "Ribenji")
Byakuran tells the Vongola that for the upcoming fight they have to bring their non-Vongola friends. They agree to take all of them with the exception of the weakened Lal. In the day of the fight, both Mafia families compete using a game named Choice in which the selected fighters have to defeat the opponent's main target to win the game. For the Vongola, the guardians participants are Tsuna, Gokudera and Yamamoto, while the non-guardians participants are Spanner and Irie with the latter being Millefiore's target. When it starts, Tsuna confronts Funeral Wreath Torikabuto and is able to overpower him with his Vongola box. Yamamoto is attacked by Genkishi, who is disguised as one of Torikabuto's subordinates. However, Genkishi is unable to defeat Yamamoto who has but improved his skills with help from Squalo.
27	Uni Arrives! Yuni Kuru! (ユニ来る!)	December 4, 2009; 978-4-08-874750-7	—
Target 248. "The End of Genkishi" (幻騎士の最期, "Genkishi no Saigo"); Target 249. "Dark Cloud" (暗雲, "An'un"); Target 250. "Resistance" (抵抗, "Teikō"); Target 251. "Choice End" (チョイス終了, "Choisu Shūryō"); Target 252. "Phalaenopsis Paradox" (ファレノプシス·パラドックス, "Farenopushisu Paradokkusu"); Target 253. "Phalaenopsis Paradox 2" (ファレノプシス·パラドックス2, "Farenopushisu Paradokkusu Ni"); Target 254. "Uni Visits" (ユニ光臨, "Yuni Kōrin"); Target 255. "Decision" (決断, "Ketsudan"); Target 256. "Desire" (欲望, "Yokubō"); Target 257. "Namimori" (並盛); Target 258. "Escape" (脱出, "Dasshutsu")
After his defeat, Genkishi is killed by Funeral Wreath Kikyo per Byakuran's orders. Tsuna and Yamamoto rush to attack their target, Funeral Wreath Daisy, but Tsuna is delayed by Torikabuto. Kikyo manages to pass Gokudera and impales Irie at the same time that Yamamoto attacks Daisy. With Daisy's Dying Will Flame intact, and Irie's one extinct, the Millefiore win Choice. Irie requests another match to Byakuran due to a promise he once made, and claiming to be the responsible one for giving him the ability to gain knowledge from parallel worlds in his experience of time traveling. When Byakuran denies, Uni appears requesting the Vongola to protect her from him. As Uni would serve to Byakuran's plans of having a power similar to omniscience, the Vongola accept and escape with her. After Hibari and Dino separate from the Vongola to check Namimori's state, Funeral Wreath Zakuro attacks their hideout and Squalo fights him to help the Vongola escape.
28	Final Battle Arrives! Saishū Kessen Kuru! (最終決戦来る!)	March 4, 2010; 978-4-08-870012-0	—
Target 259. "Uncle Kawahira" (川平のおじさん, "Kawahira no Ojisan"); Target 260. "Carnage Box Release" (修羅開匣, "Shura Kaikō"); Target 261. "Handcuffs" (手錠, "Tejō"); Target 262. "Reunion" (再会, "Saikai"); Target 263. "Coordination" (連携, "Renkei"); Target 264. "Eve" (前夜, "Zen'ya"); Target 265. "Bright Night" (夜明け, "Yoake"); Target 266. "Right Arm" (右腕, "Migiude"); Target 267. "Crash" (激突, "Gekitotsu"); Target 268. "Single Strike" (一撃, "Ichigeki")
Uncle Kawahira, I-pin's boss, hides the Vongola in his restaurant to protect them from Zakuro. Back in Namimori, Daisy is confronted by Dino and Hibari, with the latter managing to defeat him with his Vongola Box. The other Funeral Wreaths find Tsuna's group but they escape once Tsuna defeats Torikabuto. In order to face the remaining Funeral Wreaths, the Vongola split in three parties with the first of them ambushing Zakuro. As all of them are overwhelmed by Zakuro when Bluebell comes to help him, the Varia decides to aid the Vongola in their fight. Meanwhile, Kikyo and his men attack the second party as the third one is protecting Uni.
29	Tsuna vs. Byakuran Arrives! Tsuna Tai Byakuran Kuru! (ツナ対白蘭来る!)	April 30, 2010; 978-4-08-870034-2	—
Target 269. "1 R"; Target 270. "Dilemma" (窮地, "Kyūchi"); Target 271. "Kokuyo Comes Together" (黒曜集結, "Kokuyou Shūketsu"); Target 272. "Ghost" (GHOST); Target 273. "Absorption" (吸収, "Kyūshū"); Target 274. "The Way Of The Flame" (炎の行方, "Honō no Yukue"); Target 275. "Tsunayoshi Sawada vs. Byakuran" (沢田綱吉vs白蘭, "Sawada Tsunayoshi Bāsasu Byakuran"); Target 276. "Resonance" (共鳴, "Kyōmei"); Target 277. "Unlucky" (不運, "Fūn"); Target 278. "Sea, Shellfish and Rainbow" (「海」「貝」「虹」, "Umi Kai Niji")
Now free from prison, the future Mukuro interrupts the fight between the Millefiore and the Vongola, aiding the latter. Byakuran decides to send the last Funeral Wreath, Ghost, who is in fact parallel double of Byakuran himself. As Ghost starts absorbing the energy from all the fighters including his comrades', Tsuna goes to stop him. Upon realizing Ghost is composed of Dying Will Flames, Tsuna absorbs him, but Ghost is instead merged within Byakuran. Having now all the flames Ghost took, Byakuran confronts Tsuna, easily overwhelming him. However, once Tsuna comes to the resolve he still wants to defeat Byakuran, the first Vongola boss briefly appears from Tsuna's ring and removes a seal within it the Vongola Rings to let Tsuna use its full power. Thus, Tsuna is able to fight at Byakuran's level.
30	Transfer Students Arrive! Tenkōsei Kuru! (転校生来る!)	August 8, 2010; 978-4-08-870087-8	—
Target 279. "When the Rainbow Fades" (虹の消える時, "Niji no Kieru Toki"); Target 280. "The Last Blow" (最後の一撃, "Saigo no Ichigeki"); Target 281. "What We Had to Leave Behind" (残されたもの, "Nokosaretamono"); Target 282. "Goodbye Future" (さよなら未来, "Sayonara Mirai"); Target 283. "Simon Middle School" (至門中学, "Shimon Chūgaku"); Target 284. "Transfer Students" (転校生, "Tenkōsei"); Target 285. "Gathering" (集合, "Shūgō"); Target 286. "Sympathy" (共感, "Kyōkan"); Target 287. "Urgent Call" (緊急招集, "Kinkyū Shōshū"); Target 288. "Bodyguard" (警護, "Keigo")
Uni incinerates herself alongside Gamma in order to make Arcobaleno reborn from their pacifiers. They revive after Tsuna manages to kill Byakuran, ending the battle between both families. The arcobaleno help Irie send Tsuna and his friends back to the past using the same time machine that made them stay in the future after being shot by Lambo's bazooka. Back to his normal life, Tsuna receives news that next week, the inheritance ceremony in which Tsuna will officially become the 10th Vongola boss will start. As Tsuna doubts whether he should become the 10th boss, he and his guardians meet new transfer students later revealed to be part of the Simon Family meant to bodyguard Tsuna.
31	Inheritance Ceremony Arrives! Keishō Shiki Kuru! (継承式来る!)	October 4, 2010; 978-4-08-870112-7	—
Target 289. "Tension" (緊張, "Kinchō"); Target 290. "Communication" (コミュニケーション, "Komyunikēshon"); Target 291. "Ninth" (9代目, "Kyūdaime"); Target 292. "Consultation" (相談, "Sōdan"); Target 293. "Chance Encounters" (すれちがい, "Surechigai"); Target 294. "Decision" (決意, "Ketsui"); Target 295. "Inheritance Ceremony" (継承式, "Keishō Shiki"); Target 296. "The Culprit" (犯人, "Han'nin"); Target 297. "Blood" (血, "Chi"); Target 298. "Overpowered" (圧倒, "Attō"); Target 299. "Talbot" (タルボ, "Tarubo")
As the time of the ceremony comes, Tsuna refuses to become the next boss afraid of his guardians' fates. A few days before the ceremony, Yamamoto is brutally attacked by the Simon member Kaoru Mizuno when discovering their intention of destroying the Vongola. While he is being treated in the hospital unconscious, an enraged Tsuna decides to accept the Vongola 10th boss title, knowing the culprit is going to be in the ceremony. As the ceremony starts, the Simon steal the Vongola's Sin which will help them eliminate the Vongola. Tsuna and his guardians try to stop them, but they are all easily overwhelmed by their leader Enma Kozato. As the Vongola are defeated, the Simon leave kidnapping Chrome and swearing they will avenge their ancestors.
32	Vongola vs. Simon Arrives! Bongore Bāsasu Shimon Kuru! (ボンゴレVS.シモン来る!)	December 3, 2010; 978-4-08-870146-2	—
Target 300. "Ver. Up" (Ver.アップ, "Bājon Appu"); Target 301. "Resolution" (決意, "Ketsui"); Target 302. "Pursuit" (追跡, "Tsuiseki"); Target 303. "Outbreak of War" (開戦, "Kaisen"); Target 304. "Ryohei Sasagawa vs. Koyo Aoba" (笹川了平VS.青葉紅葉, "Sasagawa Ryōhei Bāsasu Aoba Koyo"); Target 305. "Vongola Gear of the Sun" (晴のVG, "Hare no Bongore Gia"); Target 306. "Eye" (眼, "Me"); Target 307. "Limit" (リミット, "Rimitto"); Target 308. "Key" (鍵, "Kagi"); Target 309. "Chrome Dokuro and Kato Julie" (クローム髑髏と加藤ジュリー, "Kurōmu Dokuro to Katō Jurī"); Target 310. "Lambo! Lambo! Lambo" (ランボ!ランボ!ランボ!, "Ranbo! Ranbo! Ranbo!")
After having the Vongola Rings upgraded, Tsuna goes to the Simon's hideout to settle his arguments with Enma. Accompanied by Reborn, Gokudera, Ryohei and Lambo, the group arrives to an island from the Simon where they are challenged by them. Ryohei is confronted by Koyo Aoba who had become his rival in school prior to the Simon's betrayal. As both use all their strength, the battle ends in a tie. Both Ryohei and Aoba are taken to by the Vindice to prison due to the rules settled, and a memory showing the Vongola's and Simon's origins is shown to all the participants.
33	Dark Shadow Arrives! Kurai Kage Kuru! (濃い影来る!)	March 4, 2011; 978-4-08-870187-5	—
Target 311. "Lambo vs Rauji Oyama" (ランボvs大山らうじ, "Ranbo Bāsasu Ōyama Rauji"); Target 312. "Lambo's Feelings" (ランボの思い, "Ranbo no Omoi"); Target 313. "Brother" (兄ちゃん, "Nii-chan"); Target 314. "For Whose Sake" (誰がために, "Ta ga Tame ni"); Target 315. "Hayato Gokudera vs Shitt P!" (獄寺隼人 VS SHITT・P!, "Gokudera Hayato Bāsasu Shitto Pī!"); Target 316. "Tears" (涙, "Namida"); Target 317. "Enma's Anger" (炎真の怒り, "Enma no Ikari"); Target 318. "Beyond the Mist" (霧の向こう, "Kiri no Mukō"); Target 319. "Dark Shadow" (濃い影, "Kurai Kage"); Target 320. "Hibari Comes Flying!" (雲雀飛来!, "Hibari Hirai!")
Lambo able to defeat Rauji after upgrading his Vongola Gear, followed by Gokudera who able to defeat Shitt.P. After the battle with Shitt. P, Enma, out of rage, challenged Tsuna into battle. Tsuna and Enma able to fight in par until Enma revealed Tsuna's father, Iemitsu, killed his parents and sister, making Tsuna losing his will to fight. Enma about to deal a finishing blow but then his Shimon ring gone out of control, forcing him to retreat. Back at Chrome's condition, Julie finally revealed that he's the one who arrange the battle between Vongola and Shimon as he revealed himself as Vongola first Mist Guardian, Daemon Spade. He revealed that he wished to use her in order to get Mukuro's body and asked for her cooperation. Chrome immediately refused, making Daemon use his mind control on Chrome. Adelheid challenged Tsuna into battle but Hibari suddenly arrived with helicopter, fighting Adelheid in Tsuna's place.
34	Awakening Arrives! Kakusei Kuru! (覚醒来る!)	May 2, 2011; 978-4-08-870220-9	—
Target 321. "Kyoya Hibari vs Adelheid Suzuki" (雲雀恭弥VS.鈴木アーデルハイト, "Hibari Kyōya Bāsasu Suzuki Āderuhaito"); Target 322. "Hibari vs 500" (雲雀VS.500体, "Hibari Bāsasu Go-hyaku-tai"); Target 323. "Small Animal" (小動物, "Shōdōbutsu"); Target 324. "Betrayal" (裏切り, "Uragiri"); Target 325. "Rebellion" (反抗, "Hankō"); Target 326. "Truth" (真実, "Shinjitsu"); Target 327. "Supplication" (切願, "Setsugan"); Target 328. "The Enemy Who Must Be Defeated" (倒すべき敵, "Taosubeki Teki"); Target 329. "Awakening Complete" (覚醒完了, "Kakusei Kanryō"); Target 330. "Reunion" (再会, "Saikai")
Hibari defeated Adelheid and her 500 Blizzaroids, revealing the fifth key that showing Giotto intended to help Cozart when he and his Family in pinch. At this time, Daemon finally revealed himself to Tsuna and the others and admitted that he's the one behind the whole fight between Vongola and Shimon as well as his true intention. Kaoru stabbed Daemon after hearing this but Daemon used his illusions and gravely injured Kaoru but was saved by recovered Yamamoto. Another key was shown as Kaoru already lost his pride and then revealed that Cozart never been killed since G. and the other remaining Guardians saved him by Giotto's order. Daemon and Chrome retreated after a brief fight with Yamamoto. The next day, Daemon undo his mind control on Chrome and removed the island's barrier as well as her illusionary organs to lure out Mukuro. Mukuro quickly replaced Chrome and ready to battle Daemon. Meanwhile, Tsuna confronted Enma, who already consumed by hatred and fight him.
35	Daemon Reborn Arrives! Shinsei Deimon Kuru! (新生D来る!)	August 4, 2011; 978-4-08-870256-8	—
Target 331. "New Cambio Forma" (新しい形態変化, "Atarashii Kanbio Foruma"); Target 332. "Tsuna's Pride" (ツナの誇り, "Tsuna no Hokori"); Target 333. "Oath" (誓い, "Chikai"); Target 334. "Mukuro Rokudo vs. Daemon Spade" (六道骸VS.D・スペード, "Rokudō Mukuro Bāsasu Deimon Supēdo"); Target 335. "Unforeseen Event" (異変, "Ihen"); Target 336. "Daemon Reborn" (新生D, "Shinsei Deimon"); Target 337. "Daemon's Power" (Dの力, "Deimon no Chikara"); Target 338. "Kyoya Hibari vs. Daemon Spade" (雲雀恭弥VS.D・スペード, "Hibari Kyōya Bāsasu Deimon Supēdo"); Target 339. "No-Good Combo" (ダメダメコンビ, "Dame Dame Konbi"); Target 340. "Enma's Decision" (炎真の決断, "Enma no Ketsudan"); Target 341. "Conflict" (葛藤, "Kattō")
With new Cambio Forma and XX Burner, Tsuna managed to get Enma back to his senses and revealing the sixth key, which is a clear pacifier. The memory showed Giotto and Cozart agreed to keep the Shimon Family's survival a secret and a Vendice appeared along with Arcobaleno with the clear pacifier, surprising the participants especially Reborn. Mukuro fought and easily defeat Daemon with Mist Vongola Gear, freeing Julie from Daemon's possession. However, afterwards, Mukuro unable to return to his own body and instead possessed his box weapon with his remaining power as he came into realization that Daemon purposely lost. Daemon succeed on possessing Mukuro's body and gained the same attribute as Vendice, leading to a prison break. Vongola and Shimon made agreement with Bermuda to negate the battle between the two Families and release the imprisoned members if they able to defeat Daemon. Arrived with possessing Mukuro's body, Daemon sent Yamamoto, Gokudera, Lambo, Julie, and Hibari to illusionary world, leaving only Tsuna and Enma to fight him. As the battle goes on, Enma was about to sacrificed himself to defeat Daemon until Chrome interferes and protect Enma, making Tsuna no longer hesitated and fired full power XX Burner at entraped Daemon.
36	Curse of The Rainbow Arrives! Niji no Noroi Kuru! (虹の呪い来る!)	October 4, 2011; 978-4-08-870256-8	—
Target 342. "Direction" (行方, "Yukue"); Target 343. "Oath" (誓い, "Chikai"); Target 344. "Trump Card" (切り札, "Kirifuda"); Target 345. "Eternal Elena" (永遠のエレナ, "Eien no Erena"); Target 346. "And Smile..." (そして笑顔・・・, "Soshite Egao..."); Target 347. "Mamon and the New Battle Force" (マーモンと新戦力, "Māmon to Shin Senryoku"); Target 348. "Mamon and the New Battle Force 2" (マーモンと新戦力2, "Māmon to Shin Senryoku 2"); Target 349. "Unexpected Problem" (ふとした疑問, "Futoshita Gimon"); Target 350. "Nightmare" (悪夢, "Akumu"); Target 351. "Request" (頼み, "Tanomi")
Daemon turned out to survive Tsuna's XX Burner, shocking Tsuna and the others. Tsuna helplessly was beaten up by Daemon. However, Enma's Earth Shimon Ring merged with Tsuna's Sky Vongola Ring that revealed to be the seventh key. With Giotto and Cozart's Flame of Oath, Tsuna managed to overpower Daemon. Daemon attempted to escape by abandoning Mukuro's body but the Vendice destroyed the portal, leaving Daemon defenseless and blasted by Tsuna's X Burner. As Daemon was in verge of death, Tsuna picked up his pocket watch that contain an old photograph of Daemon with Primo Family and a woman beside him, which he revealed to be his lover, Elena. Daemon explained his past, revealing it was all for his lover's sake. Tsuna helped Daemon to come into terms with his past, and he finally dies peacefully. As promised, The Vendice free Ryohei and the Shimon Guardians and Mukuro and gave them the eight key that showing Giotto and Cozart's past after the war. Several weeks later, Varia and Kokuyo intended to recruit Flan who live in France into their team, but both sides ended up against taking him into their custody after Flan mocked them. The Arcobaleno, with the exception of Luce and Lal, later have a dream that connected them to a man with iron hat, Checker Face, the one responsible for giving them the Curse of The Rainbow and proposed a way to be freed from the curse they are bearing. After this dream, the Arcobaleno requested the people they chose to fight for their sake.
37	The Representative Battle of the Rainbow Arrives! Niji no dairi sensō kuru! (虹の代理戦争来る!)	January 4, 2012; 978-4-08-870314-5	—
Target 352. "The Proposition" (提案, "Teian"); Target 353. "The Representatives" (それぞれの代理, "Sorezore no Dairi"); Target 354. "Verde And Mukuro" (ヴェルデと骸, "Verude to Mukuro); Target 355. "Uni, Gamma, And Byakuran" (ユニとγと白蘭, "Yuni to Ganma to Byakuran"); Target 356. "The Rules of the Battle of Representatives" (代理戦争のルール, "Dairi Sensō no Rūru"); Target 357. "Dad's Coming Home" (父帰る, "Chichi Kaeru"); Target 358. "The Eve of Battle" (開戦前夜, "Kaisen Zen'ya"); Target 359. "The Starting Day" (始まりの日, "Hajimari no Hi"); Target 360. "Sawada Tsunayoshi vs. Sawada Iemitsu" (沢田 綱吉VS(バーサス).沢田 家光, "Sawada Tsunayoshi vs. Sawada Iemitsu"); Target 361. "Present" (贈物, "Okurimono")
Reborn chooses Tsuna, Gokudera, Yamamoto, Ryohei and Dino as his representatives, while Uni has both Gamma's and Byakuran's groups as her representatives and Verde the Kokuyo Gang. All representatives and Arcobalenos are given representative watches by Wonomichi, Checker-Face's servant, with the destruction of the representatives' leader's destruction meaning the team's disqualification. Reborn's team forms an alliance with Yuni's team, while Colonello is revealed to have chosen the CEDEF as his representative team. The first day of the Representative Battle begins and is ordered and Tsuna finds himself fighting against Iemitsu who is on Colonello's team. Gokudera, Yamamoto and Ryohei are encountered by Hibari who is the only member of Fon's team and breaks Ryohei's watch. Meanwhile, Skull's single representative, Enma Kozato, is attacked by the Varia, Mammon's representative team.
38	Lifted Curse Arrives! Jukai kuru! (呪解来る!)	April 4, 2012; 978-4-08-870388-6	—
Target 362. "Cure for the Curse" (呪解, "Jukai"); Target 363. "The Threat Team" (脅威のチーム, "Kyōi no Chīmu"); Target 364. "The Second Day" (2日目, "Futsukame"); Target 365. "Uni's Premonition" (ユニの予言, "Yuni no Yogen"); Target 366. "The Second Day of Battle Begins!!" (2日目開戦!!, "Futsukame Kaisen!!"); Target 367. "A Single Strike" (一撃, "Ichigeki"); Target 368. "The Second Battle" (第二射, "Dainisha"); Target 369. "Rematch" (再戦, "Saisen"); Target 370. "Lesson" (レッスン, "Ressun"); Target 371. "Non-standard" (規格外, "Kikakugai")
Being able to temporarily recover his human form with the Arcobaleno watch, Skull manages to defend Enma from the Varia until the official match's time ends and the rest of the Simon Family decide to join him. As Tsuna is defeated by Iemitsu, Reborn proposes to ally with their team so that they would not break Tsuna's watch. With both Reborn's and Uni's team overwhelmed in previous match, Reborn also proposes to ally with Uni's team in their fight against Verde's team. During the fight, Iemitsu breaks the alliance he previously made to attack the three teams participating. Byakuran sacrifices his watch to save Tsuna who once again fights his father. Before Tsuna is once again defeated, Reborn takes his human form to advise him on how he should Iemitsu. This time the fight does not reach its conclusion to the time limit hitting before Tsuna and Iemitsu can finish each other. Meanwhile, Hibari and Fon able to defeat Leviathan, Lussuria, and Belphegor thanks to Fon using his present time to break the curse.
39	The 8th Baby Arrives! Hachininme no Akanbō Kuru! (8人目の赤ん坊来る!)	June 4, 2012; 978-4-08-870419-7	—
Target 372. "Fon's Power" (風の力, "Fon no Chikara"); Target 373. "Fon vs. Mammon" (風VS.マーモン, "Fon Bāsasu Māmon"); Target 374. "Kyoya Hibari vs. XANXUS" (雲雀恭弥VS.XANXUS, "Hibari Kyōya Bāsasu Zanzasu"); Target 375. "Appearance" (出現, "Shutsugen"); Target 376. "A New Force" (新勢力, "Shinseiryoku"); Target 377. "Assault From the Darkness" (闇からの強襲, "Yami Kara no Kyōshū"); Target 378. "Surprise Attack" (闇討ち, "Yamiuchi"); Target 379. "Damage" (ダメージ, "Damēji"); Target 380. "The Third Day" (3日目, "Mikkame"); Target 381. "Together!" (共闘!, "Kyōtō!")
Hibari and Fon fight Squalo, Mammon and Xanxus, with the match ending up in a draw. Refusing to accept the result, Hibari breaks his own Boss watch so he can continue the fight outside the battle time. Checker Face announces the result of the battle and explains that Team Skull has been defeated by the Vindice led by Bermuda von Vichtenstein, an Arcobaleno with a clear pacifier who appeared in Giotto's and Cozart's memories. Bermuda declares that he and his team will participate in the Representative Battle, stealing Team Skull's watches. Shortly after, Vindice attacks the remaining teams outside the battle time. Once the Arcobaleno return from their meeting, the Vindice retreat. Team Collonnelo is disqualified due to Iemitsu's Boss watch being destroyed while protecting Nana, with the other teams heavily injured. Not long after the attack, however, right at 00.00. a.m, the watches announce the battle to start. Team Reborn and Team Verde meet at nearby park and decide to temporarily work together to defeat three Vindice who also appear at the same place. With their teamwork, they are able to rip off the Vindice's robes and are shocked to see the Vindice's true forms with a stone pacifier hanging from each of their necks.
40	The Mystery of the Rainbow Arrives! Niji no Nazo Kuru! (虹の謎来る!)	September 4, 2012; 978-4-08-870479-1	—
Target 382. "The Power of the Vindice" (復讐者の力, "Vuindiche no chikara"); Target 383. "Flames of Determination" (決意の炎, "Ketsui no Honō"); Target 384. "Those Who Watch the Battle" (戦いを見る者, "Tatakai o miru mono"); Target 385. "Invitation" (勧誘, "Gansū"); Target 386. "The Fated Day and The Representative War" (運命の日と代理戦争, "Unmei no hi to dairi sensō"); Target 387. "Reborn's Doubt" (リボーンの疑問, "Ribōn no Gimon"); Target 388. "Dilemma" (窮地, "Kiyū Chiji"); Target 389. "Tsuna Moves" (ツナ動く, "Tsuna Ugoku"); Target 390. "Home Tutor Disqualification" (家庭教師失格, "Kateikyō Shikkaku"); Target 391. "The Big Summoning" (大招集, "Dai Shōshū")
The Vindice, in their true forms, defeat Yamamoto, Gokudera, Ken, and Chikusa, leaving only Tsuna and Mukuro to fight. They are both cornered and almost lose until Chrome arrives and supports Mukuro's illusions with her own, defeating two of the three Vindice. The last Vindice, Jack, is defeated by Tsuna not long afterwards. Bermuda appears, proposes an invitation for Reborn to join his team and takes him and Tsuna to the Vindice's Prison where they learn the truth behind the Representative Battle of the Rainbow and Checker Face. Bermuda reveals his intention to kill Checker Face, though this means it would also kill them and the current Arcobaleno. Reborn refuses the offer after Tsuna declares that he'll find another way to keep the Arcobaleno alive. Tsuna and Jager fight, but the former is quickly defeated. Bermuda decides to give Reborn some time to rethink his proposal and he lets them leave. Tsuna wonders what could he do to help the Arcobaleno, and gets an idea on how to prolong their lives. After some discussion with Talbot and after visiting the teams' bosses one by one, asking them to lend their strength, Tsuna's plan comes to fruition. The next day, the people whom Tsuna has visited gathers at Tsuna's house as Tsuna asks for them to join forces and fight together to defeat Bermuda and his team.
41	Vindice Battle Arrive! Vindiche-sen Kuru! (復讐者戦（ヴィンディチェ）来る!)	December 4, 2012; 978-4-08-870517-0	—
Target 392. "Right Before the Decisive Battle" (決戦直前, "Kessen Chokuzen"); Target 393. "Tsuna's Persuasion" (ツナの説得, "Tsuna no Settoku"); Target 394. "The Day of the Clash" (激突の日, "Gekitotsu no Hi"); Target 395. "Attack One by One" (各個撃破！, "Kakko Gekiha!"); Target 396. "The Allied League" (連合チーム, "Rengō Chīmu"); Target 397. "Strength of Vongola" (ボンゴレの力, "Bongore no Chikara"); Target 398. "Vs. Jager" (VS(バーサス).イエーガー, "Vs. Iēgā"); Target 399. "Dilemma" (窮地, "Kyūchi"); Target 400. "Overwhelming" (圧倒的, "Attōteki"); Target 401. "Tsunayoshi Sawada vs. Jager" (沢田 綱吉VS(バーサス).イエーガー, "Sawada Tsunayoshi vs. Iēgā")
Tsuna convinces all of the remaining teams to form alliance together to defeat Team Bermuda. Afterwards, Tsuna tries to persuade Reborn to not lose hope, and after a heat argument, Reborn and the other Arcobalenos finally agrees with Tsuna's plan to fight against Team Bermuda. The next day, as the battle start, by using their technicians' invention, the allied teams successfully lured the remaining Vendicare members in three separate locations with intention for Tsuna, Enma, and Basil, who are the commando members of the allied teams, to defeat the Vendicares one by one while the remaining members buying times against Bermuda and the remaining three Vendicares until they arrive. While successful in defeating Alejandro without any harm, Basil was defeated at the fight against Big Pino and Small Gia, followed by Gokudera and Yamamoto who were able to defeat the two Vendicares with assistance from Fran and Chrome at the cost of their Battler Watches destroyed. Meanwhile, Jager easily defeats Squalo, Xanxus, Byakuran, and Dino, leaving only Mukuro and Hibari to fight until Tsuna arrives with Enma, Chrome and Fran. With the cooperation of his remaining allies, Tsuna is able to defeat Jager. However, before he can finish him, Bermuda dispels his curse to fight Tsuna.
42	Ciao Ciao Arrive! Chao Chao Kuru! (ちゃおちゃお来る!)	March 4, 2013; 978-4-08-870552-1	—
Target 402. "Curse Lifted Battle" (呪解バトル, "Jukai Batoru"); Target 403. "The Ultimate Dying Will" (究極の死ぬ気, "Kyūkyoku no Shinuki"); Target 404. "The Last Fist" (最後の拳, "Saigo no Ken"); Target 405. "The Past And Future Trini Sette" (7³(トゥリニセッテ)の過去と未来, "Turinisette no Kako to Mirai"); Target 406. "What Will Be Of The Curse" (呪いの行方, "Noroi no Yukue"); Target 407. "The Ultimate Choice" (究極の選択, "Kyūkyoku no Sentaku"); Target 408. "The Ultimate Decision" (究極の決断, "Kyūkyoku no Ketsudan"); Target 409. "Ciao Ciao!" (ちゃおちゃお！, "Chao Chao!"); "Monster Tamer Tsuna" (怪物づかいツナ, "Kaibutsu-Tsukai Tsuna")
Bermuda destroys the watches of Tsuna's fallen comrades to prevent them from assisting him. Tsuna fights Bermuda, and quickly overwhelmed by Bermuda's short warp. Reborn uses his remaining curse release time and helps Tsuna, but also quickly started to be overwhelmed by him. However, he uses his Dying Will Bullet at Tsuna, allowing him to enter Ultimate Dying Will Mode and defeat Bermuda with ease. Checker Face shows himself as Team Reborn is declared as the winner, revealing his true identity as Kawahira and the history behind the Tri-ni-Set. Talbot arrives with another solution to protect the Tri-ni-set without having to create Arcobaleno with the power of Bermuda's Flame of Night. Agreeing to entrust the Tri-ni-Set to the future generation, Kawahira released the Arcobaleno from their curse, allowing them to grow up like normal humans. Several days afterwards, after receiving invitation to Colonnello and Lal's wedding, Reborn shots Tsuna with Dying Will Bullet to confess his love to Kyoko, which he failed because of helping Haru from falling steels that he caused by accident. Tsuna is then faced with decision to becoming Vongola Tenth or not, which he quickly refused and Reborn left. One week after Reborn's departure, Tsuna realises that he is still living a No-Good life and gets upset. However, Reborn suddenly comes back with a mission to make him Neo Vongola Primo, which is the same as becoming Vongola Decimo. As Tsuna is surprise by Reborn's sudden arrival and his friends who were invited by him, Tsuna begins to realise that even though not much, he has changed to the better since now he has friends that he can rely on when necessary, and it's all thanks to Reborn.
